= List of Telugu films of 2021 =

This is a list of Telugu-language films produced in the Telugu cinema in India and were released in 2021.

== Box office collection ==
The list of highest-grossing Telugu films released in 2021, by worldwide box office gross revenue, are as follows:

*	Denotes films still running in cinemas worldwide

Highest worldwide gross of 2021
Rank	Title	Production company	Worldwide gross	Ref
1	Pushpa: The Rise	Mythri Movie Makers; Muttamsetty Media	₹370 crore (equivalent to ₹453 crore or US$47 million in 2026)	
2	Akhanda	Dwaraka Creations	₹150 crore (equivalent to ₹184 crore or US$19 million in 2026)	
3	Vakeel Saab	Sri Venkateswara Creations	₹137.65 crore (equivalent to ₹169 crore or US$18 million in 2026)	
4	Uppena	Mythri Movie Makers; Sukumar Writings	₹100 crore (equivalent to ₹122 crore or US$13 million in 2026)	
5	Krack	Saraswathi Films Division	₹70.6 crore (equivalent to ₹86 crore or US$9.0 million in 2026)	
6	Jathi Ratnalu	Swapna Cinema	₹70 crore (equivalent to ₹86 crore or US$8.9 million in 2026)	
7	Love Story	Amigos Creations; Sree Venkateswara Cinemas	₹62 crore (equivalent to ₹76 crore or US$7.9 million in 2026)	
8	Most Eligible Bachelor	GA2 Pictures	₹51 crore (equivalent to ₹62 crore or US$6.5 million in 2026)	
9	Shyam Singha Roy	Niharika Entertainment	₹48−50 crore (equivalent to ₹−61 crore or US$−6.4 million in 2026)	
10	Red	Sri Sravanthi Movies	₹35.64 crore (equivalent to ₹44 crore or US$4.5 million in 2026)	

== January – March ==
Opening		Title	Director	Cast	Production company	Ref.
J A N U A R Y	9	Krack	Gopichand Malineni	Ravi Teja; Shruti Haasan; Varalaxmi Sarathkumar; Samuthirakani; P. Ravi Shankar; Chirag Jani; Devi Prasad; Mouryani	Saraswathi Films Division	
J A N U A R Y	12	Mail	Uday Gurrala	Priyadarshi Pulikonda; Harshith Malgireddy; Mani Aegurla; Gouripriya Reddy; Yennengee; Ravinder Bommakanti; Vannarn; Srikanth Palle; Anusha Netha	Swapna Cinema	
J A N U A R Y	14	Red	Kishore Tirumala	Ram Pothineni; Nivetha Pethuraj; Malvika Sharma; Amritha Aiyer; Sampath Raj; Vennela Kishore; Nassar; Posani Krishna Murali; Sonia Aggarwal; Satya; Pavitra Lokesh; Narra Srinivas; Charandeep	Sri Sravanthi Movies	
J A N U A R Y	14	Alludu Adhurs	Santhosh Srinivas	Bellamkonda Sreenivas; Nabha Natesh; Anu Emmanuel; Sonu Sood; Prakash Raj	Sumanth Movie Productions	
J A N U A R Y	15	Cycle	Aatla Arjun Reddy	Punarnavi Bhupalam; Mahat Raghavendra; Sudarshan; Swetha Varma; Annapoorna	Overseas Entertainment Network	
J A N U A R Y	22	Super Over	Praveen Varma	Naveen Chandra; Chandini Chowdary; Ajay; Harsha Chemudu; Rakendu Mouli; Praveen	SAS Pictures	
J A N U A R Y	23	Bangaru Bullodu	P. V. Giri	Allari Naresh; Pooja Jhaveri; Posani Krishna Murali; Ajay Ghosh; Vennela Kishore; Tanikella Bharani; Satyam Rajesh; Prudhvi Raj	AK Entertainments	
J A N U A R Y	29	30 Rojullo Preminchadam Ela	Munna	Pradeep Machiraju; Amritha Aiyer; Harsha Chemudu; Subhalekha Sudhakar; Posani Krishna Murali; Hema; Bhadram; Hyper Aadi; Sivannarayana Naripeddi; Sruthi	SV Productions	
J A N U A R Y	29	Amma Deevena	Shiva Eturi	Aamani; Posani Krishna Murali; Ajay Ghosh	Lakshmamma Productions	
J A N U A R Y	29	Annapurnamma Gari Manavadu	Narra Shiva Nageswara Rao	Baladithya; Veda Sastry; Vikram Chary; Vijayendra	MNR Films	
J A N U A R Y	29	Cheppina Evaru Nammaru	Aaryan Krishna	Aaryan Krishna; Supyardee Singh; Vikram Chary; Vijayendra	SMS Art Productions	
J A N U A R Y	29	Jai Sena	V. Samudra	Srikanth; Sunil; Sreeram; Taraka Ratna; Preeti Sharma	Shiva Maha Teja Films	
J A N U A R Y	29	Mr & Miss	Ashok Reddy	Sailesh Sunny; Gnaneswari Kandregula		
J A N U A R Y	29	Kalaposhakulu	Chalapathy Puvvula	Vishva Karthikeya; Deepa; Gemini Suresh; Ananth; Krishnaveni	Sri Vennela Creations	
F E B R U A R Y	4	Madhura Wines	Bandi Jayakishore	Naveen Kumar Reddy; Sahasra Reddy; Tumuluri Sammohit; Kommuri Leela Venkatesh	RK Cine Talkies; Karthik Cult Creations	
F E B R U A R Y	5	Zombie Reddy	Prasanth Varma	Sajja Teja; Anandhi; Harsha Vardhan; Raghu Babu; Daksha Nagarkar; Prudhvi Raj; Raghu Karumanchi; Kireeti Damaraju; Annapoorna; Vitta Mahesh	Apple Trees Studios	
F E B R U A R Y	5	Pranavum	Kumar G	Sree Mangam; Avantika Hari; Gayatri Iyer; Gemini suresh; Shashank	CG Charitha And Gowtham Productions	
F E B R U A R Y	5	G- Zombie	Aryan; Deepu	Aryan Gowra; Divya Pandey	Sai Surya Productions	
F E B R U A R Y	12	Uppena	Bucchi Babu Sana	Panja Vaisshnav Tej; Krithi Shetty; Vijay Sethupathi	Mythri Movie Makers; Sukumar Writings	
F E B R U A R Y	12	FCUK: Father Chitti Umaa Kaarthik	Vidya Sagar Raju	Jagapathi Babu; Ammu Abhirami; Ram Karthik; Baby Sahrashita; Ali; Rajitha; Krishna Bhagavaan; Brahmaji; Raja; Ram Prasad	Sri Ranjith Movies	
F E B R U A R Y	19	Pitta Kathalu	Nag Ashwin, B. V. Nandini Reddy, Tharun Bhascker, Sankalp Reddy	Shruti Haasan; Eesha Rebba; Amala Paul; Lakshmi Manchu; Jagapathi Babu; Saanve Megghana; Sanjith Hegde; Ashwin Kakumanu; Satyadev; Srinivas Avasarala; Anish Kuruvilla; Ashima Narwal; Thanmayi	RSVP Movies; Flying Unicorn Entertainment	
F E B R U A R Y	19	Naandhi	Vijay Kanakamedala	Allari Naresh; Varalaxmi Sarathkumar; Priyadarshi Pulikonda; Harish Uthaman; Praveen	SV2 Pictures	
F E B R U A R Y	19	Kapatadhaari	Pradeep Krishnamoorthy	Sumanth; Nandita Swetha; Nassar; Jayaprakash; Vennela Kishore; Suman Ranganathan; J. Satish Kumar	Creative Entertainers	
F E B R U A R Y	26	A: Ad Infitium	Ugandhar Muni	Nithin Prasanna; Preethi Asrani; Baby Deevena; Rangadam; Krishna Veni; Bharadwaj	Avanthika Productions	
F E B R U A R Y	26	Check	Chandra Sekhar Yeleti	Nithiin; Rakul Preet Singh; Priya Prakash Varrier; Sampath Raj	Bhavya Creations	
F E B R U A R Y	26	Akshara	B.Chinni Krishna	Nandita Swetha; Ajay Ghosh; Shakalaka Shankar; K. Sivasankar; Satya; Madhunandan	Cinema Hall Entertainments	
F E B R U A R Y	26	Ninnila Ninnila	Ani I V Sasi	Ashok Selvan; Nithya Menon; Ritu Varma; Nassar; Satya	Sri Venkateswara Cine Chitra	
M A R C H	5	A1 Express	Dennis Jeevan Kanukolanu	Sundeep Kishan; Lavanya Tripathi; Rao Ramesh; Murali Sharma; Posani Krishna Murali; Priyadarshi Pulikonda; Raghu Babu; Satya	People Media Factory; Abhishek Agarwal Arts; Venkatadri Talkies	
M A R C H	5	Shaadi Mubarak	Padmasri	Sagar; Drushya Raghunath; Rahul Ramakrishna	Sri Venkateswara Creations	
M A R C H	5	April 28 Em Jarigindi	Veera Swamy.G	Raja Ranjith; Sherry Agarwal; Tanikella Bharani; Ajay; Rajeev Kanakala; Chammak Chandra	V. G. Entertainment	
M A R C H	5	Power Play	Vijay Kumar Konda	Raj Tarun; Hemal Ingle; Shamna Kasim; Prince Cecil; Kota Srinivasa Rao; Satyam Rajesh; Ajay	Vanamalee Creations	
M A R C H	5	Play Back	Jakka Hari Prasad	Dinesh Tej; Spandana Palli; Ananya Nagalla; Arjun Kalyan; Thagubothu Ramesh; Gautam Raju; TNR; Surya; Ananda Chakrapani; Aishwarya Lekshmi; Karthikeya Krishna Malladi; Ashok Vardhan; Murthy Journalist	Sri Venkateswara Art Creations	
M A R C H	11	Sreekaram	Kishore Reddy	Sharwanand; Priyanka Mohan; Sai Kumar; Rao Ramesh; Murali Sharma; Naresh; Aamani; Saptagiri; Satya	14 Reels Plus	
M A R C H	11	Gaali Sampath	Anish Krishna	Sree Vishnu; Rajendra Prasad; Tanikella Bharani; Srikanth Aiyyangar; Raghu Babu; Mirchi Kiran; Karate Kalyani; Satya; Anish Kuruvilla; Rajitha	Imagespark Entertainment; Shine Screens	
M A R C H	11	Jathi Ratnalu	Anudeep K V	Naveen Polishetty; Priyadarshi Pulikonda; Rahul Ramakrishna; Murali Sharma; Brahmaji; Tanikella Bharani; Vennela Kishore; Faria Abdullah; Naresh VK	Swapna Cinema	
M A R C H	12	Love Life & Pakodi	Jayanth Gali	Bimal Kartheek Rebba; Sanchitha Poonacha; Krishna Hebbale; Anuradha Mallikarjun; Akarsh Raj Bagavatula	Color of My Ink Films	
M A R C H	19	Chaavu Kaburu Challaga	Koushik Pegallapati	Kartikeya Gummakonda; Lavanya Tripathi; Aamani; Srikanth Iyyengar	GA2 Pictures	
M A R C H	19	Mosagallu	Jeffrey Gee Chin	Vishnu Manchu; Kajal Aggarwal; Suniel Shetty; Ruhi Singh; Navdeep	24 Frames Factory	
M A R C H	19	Sashi	Nadikatla Srinivas Naidu	Aadhi Pudipeddi; Surbhi Puranik; Tulasi; Harsha Chemudu; Vennela Kishore; Sudarshan; Rajeev Kanakala; Ajay	Sri Hanuman Movie Makers	
M A R C H	26	Rang De	Venky Atluri	Nithiin; Keerthy Suresh; Naresh; Kausalya; Rohini; Brahmaji; Vennela Kishore; Suhas; Abhinav Gomatam	Sithara Entertainments	
M A R C H	26	Aranya	Prabhu Solomon	Rana Daggubati; Vishnu Vishal; Raghu Babu; Zoya Hussain; Shriya Pilgaonkar; Sampath Ram; Ashvin Raja; Tinnu Anand	Eros International	
M A R C H	27	Thellavarithe Guruvaram	Manikanth Gelli	Sri Simha; Harsha Chemudu; Ajay; Ravi Varma; Chitra Shukla; Rajeev Kanakala; Satya; Saranya Pradeep; Vajja Venkata Giridhar; Mourya	Vaaraahi Chalana Chitram; Loukya Entertainments	

== April – June ==
Opening		Title	Director	Cast	Production House	Ref.
A P R I L	2	Wild Dog	Ashishor Solomon	Nagarjuna; Dia Mirza; Saiyami Kher	Matinee Entertainment	
A P R I L	2	Y	Baalu Adusumilli	Sriram; Rahul Ramakrishna; Akshaya Chander; Gemini Suresh; Raghu Babu; Katthi Mahesh	Yerukonda Entertainments	
A P R I L	9	Vakeel Saab	Venu Sriram	Pawan Kalyan; Anjali; Nivetha Thomas; Ananya Nagalla; Prakash Raj; Shruti Haasan; Mukesh Rishi; Vamsi Krishna; Ananda Chakrapani	Sri Venkateswara Creations	
A P R I L	16	Deyyam	Ram Gopal Varma	Rajasekhar; Swathi Deekshith; Ahuti Prasad; Tanikella Bharani	Mango Mass Media	
M A Y	7	Thank You Brother	Ramesh Rapathi	Anasuya Bharadwaj; Viraj Ashwin; Archana Ananth; Anish Kuruvilla; Harsha Chemudu; Aadarsh Balakrishna; Annapoorna	Just Ordinary Entertainment	
M A Y	14	Cinema Bandi	Praveen Kandregula	Vikas Vasishta; Sandeep Varanasi; Sindhu Sreenivasa Murthy; Sirivennela Yanamandhala; Munivenkatappa; Uma Yg; Rag Mayur; Ram Charan; Trishara	D2R Indie	
M A Y	14	Battala Ramaswamy Biopikku	Rama Narayanan	Altaf Hassan; Lavanya Reddy; Satvika Jay; Shanthi Rao; Bhadram; Siri Chandana	Seven Hills Productions	
M A Y	27	Ek Mini Katha	Karthik Rapolu	Santosh Shoban; Kavya Thapar; Shraddha Das; Posani Krishna Murali; Brahmaji	UV Concepts; Mango Mass Media	
J U N E	11	Ardha Shathabdham	Rawindra Pulle	Karthik Rathnam; Naveen Chandra; Krishna Priya; Suhas; P. Sai Kumar; Subhalekha Sudhakar; Pavitra Lokesh; Raja Ravindra; Ajay	Rishitha Sree Creations; 24 Frames Celluloid	
J U N E	12	Pachchis	Sri Krishna; Rama Sai	Raamz; Swetaa Varma; Jay Chandra; Ravi Varma; Dayanand Reddy	Avasa Chitram; Raasta Films; Mango Mass Media	

== July – September ==
Opening		Title	Director	Cast	Production House	Ref.
J U L Y	9	Crrush	Ravi Babu	Krishna Burugula; Abhay Simha; Charan Sai; Ankita Manoj; Parree Pande; Sri Sudha	Flying Frogs	
J U L Y	20	Narappa	Srikanth Addala	Venkatesh; Priyamani; Karthik Rathnam; Rajeev Kanakala; Vasishta N. Simha; Rao Ramesh; Brahmaji; Nassar; Prabhakar	Suresh Productions; V Creations	
J U L Y	30	Thimmarusu	Sharan Koppisetty	Satyadev; Priyanka Jawalkar; Ajay; Brahmaji; Aadarsh Balakrishna; Harsha Chemudu; Ravi Babu	East Coast Productions; S Originals	
J U L Y	30	Ishq	S. S. Raju	Sajja Teja; Priya Prakash Varrier	Mega Super Good Films	
A U G U S T	6	SR Kalyanamandapam	Sridhar Gade	Kiran Abbavaram; Priyanka Jawalkar; Sai Kumar; Anil Geela; Rajsekhar Aningi	Elite Entertainments	
A U G U S T	6	Mugguru Monagallu	Abhilash reddy	Srinivasa Reddy; Dheekshith Shetty; Vennala Ramarao; Raja Ravindra; Thummala Narsimha Reddy; Nassar; Twisha Sharma; Swetha Varma; Gemini Suresh; Badram; Josh Ravi; Jabardasth Sunny; Surya	Chitra Mandhir Studio	
A U G U S T	6	Merise Merise	Pawan Kumar K	Dinesh Tej; Shweta Avasthi; Sanjay Swarup; Guru Raj; Sandya Janak; Bindu; Mani; Sashank; Nanajee	Kothuri Entertainments LLP	
A U G U S T	6	MAD	Meneni Laxman	Rajath Raghav; Spandana Palli; Madhav Chilukuri; Swetha Varma	Modella Talkies	
A U G U S T	14	Paagal	Naresh Kuppili	Vishwak Sen; Simran Choudary; Nivetha Pethuraj; Murali Sharma; Rahul Ramakrishna; Megha Lekha	Sri Venkateswara Creations; Lucky Media	
A U G U S T	19	Raja Raja Chora	Hasith Goli	Sree Vishnu; Megha Akash; Sunaina; Ravi Babu; Tanikella Bharani; Srikanth Iyyengar; Ajay Ghosh; Gangavva; Vasu Inturi	Abhishek Agarwal Arts; People Media Factory	
A U G U S T	19	Kanabadutaledu	Bala Raju M	Sunil; Vaishali Raj; Kancharapalem Raju; Sukranth Veerella; Himaja; Yugram; Praveen; Ravi Varma; Kireeti Damaraju	SS Films; Shade Studios; Sree Padha Creations	
A U G U S T	19	Crazy Uncles	E Sathi Babu	Sreemukhi; Raja Ravindra; Mano; Bharani; Posani Krishna Murali; Giridhar; Raghu Karumanchi; Hema; Gayatri Bharghavi; Vijaya Murthy; Vaajpai; Mahendra Nath; Madhuri; Sindhuri; Bandla Ganesh; Praveen	Good Cinema Group	
A U G U S T	27	Sridevi Soda Center	Karuna Kumar	Sudheer Babu; Anandhi; Naresh; Satyam Rajesh	70mm Entertainments	
A U G U S T	27	Ichata Vahanamulu Niluparadu	S Darshan	Sushanth; Meenakshi Chaudhary; Vennela Kishore; Priyadarshi Pulikonda; Abhinav Gomatam; Ravi Varma; Harish Koyalagundla; Venkat	AI Studios; Shaastra Movies	
A U G U S T	27	Vivaha Bhojanambu	Ram Abbaraju	Satya; Sundeep Kishan; Aarjavee; Srikanth Iyyengar; Sudarshan; Sivannarayana Naripeddi; Subbaraya Sharma; Harsha Chemudu	Anandi Art Creations; Soldiers Factory; Venkatadri Express	
A U G U S T	27	House Arrest	Shekher Reddy Erra	Srinivasa Reddy; Saptagiri; Adhurs Raghu; Ravi Prakash; Ravi Babu; Thagubothu Ramesh; Frustrated Sunaina; Kaushik	Primeshow Entertainment	
S E P T E M B E R	3	Dear Megha	A. Sushanth Reddy	Megha Akash; Adith Arun; Arjun Somayajula; Pavitra Lokesh	Vedaansh Creative Works	
S E P T E M B E R	3	Nootokka Jillala Andagadu	Rachakonda Vidyasagar	Avasarala Srinivas; Ruhani Sharma	Sri Venkateswara Creations; First Frame Entertainments	
S E P T E M B E R	3	Appudu - Ippudu	Chalapathi Puvvula	Sujan; Tanishq Ranjan	M/s. UK Films	
S E P T E M B E R	3	Killer	Chinna	Karthik Sai; Daly Shah; Neha Deshpandey	Yadav Production House	
S E P T E M B E R	3	Asmee	Sesh Kartikeya	Rushika Raj; Raja Narendra; Keshav Deepakam; Indu Kusuma	Saachi Creations	
S E P T E M B E R	10	Net	Bhargav Macharla	Rahul Ramakrishna; Avika Gor; Vishwadev Rachakonda; Praneeta Patnaik	Tamada Media	
S E P T E M B E R	10	Tuck Jagadish	Shiva Nirvana	Nani; Ritu Varma; Aishwarya Rajesh; Jagapathi Babu; Daniel Balaji; Nassar; Thiruveer; Rohini; Devadarshini; Naresh; Rao Ramesh; Praveen	Shine Screens	
S E P T E M B E R	10	Seetimaarr	Sampath Nandi	Gopichand; Tamannaah; Digangana Suryavanshi; Bhumika Chawla; Rahman; Tarun Arora; Rao Ramesh; Posani Krishna Murali; Tanikella Bharani	Srinivasaa Silver Screen	
S E P T E M B E R	17	Gully Rowdy	G. Nageswara Reddy	Sundeep Kishan; Neha Shetty; Bobby Simha; Harsha Chemudu; Vennela Kishore; Rajendra Prasad; Posani Krishna Murali; Shakalaka Shankar; Mime Gopi	Kona Film Corporation; M. V. V. Cinemas	
S E P T E M B E R	17	Maestro	Merlapaka Gandhi	Nithiin; Tamannaah; Nabha Natesh; Jisshu Sengupta; Naresh; Sreemukhi; Ananya Nagalla; Mangli; Racha Ravi; Harsha Vardhan	Shresht Movies	
S E P T E M B E R	24	Aakashavaani	Ashwin Gangaraju	Samuthirakani; Vinay Varma; Teja Kakumanu; Prashant; Mime Madhu; Shaking Seshu; Getup Srinu	AU&I Studios	
S E P T E M B E R	24	Alanti Sitralu	Supreeth C Krishna	Shwetta Parashar; Prawin Yendamuri; Yash Puri; Tanvi Akaanksha; Ajay Kumar Kathurvar	I&I Arts, Cosmicray Productions	
S E P T E M B E R	24	Love Story	Sekhar Kammula	Naga Chaitanya; Sai Pallavi; Rao Ramesh; Devayani; Rajeev Kanakala; Easwari Rao; Satyam Rajesh; Thagubothu Ramesh	Amigos Creations; Sree Venkateswara Cinemas	
S E P T E M B E R	24	Maro Prastanam	Johny	Tanish; Masskan Sethi; Kabir Dulhan Singh; Ravi Kale; Bhanu Sri Mehta; Amit	Mirth Media	

== October – December ==
Opening		Title	Director	Cast	Production House	Ref.
O C T O B E R	1	Republic	Deva Katta	Sai Dharam Tej; Aishwarya Rajesh; Jagapathi Babu; Ramya Krishna; Subbaraju; Aamani; Posani Krishna Murali	JB Entertainments; Zee Studios	
O C T O B E R	1	The Rose Villa	Hemanth	Dheekshith Shetty; Swetha Varma; Raja Ravindra	Chitra Mandhir Studios	
O C T O B E R	2	Idhe Maa Katha	Guru Pavan	Sumanth Ashwin; Srikanth; Bhumika Chawla; Tanya Hope	Gurappa Parameswara Productions	
O C T O B E R	8	Aaradugula Bullet	B. Gopal	Gopichand; Nayanthara; Prakash Raj; Abhimanyu Singh; Kota Srinivasa Rao; Brahmanandam; Jaya Prakash Reddy; Rama Prabha; Uttej	Jaya Balaji Real Media	
O C T O B E R	8	Itlu Amma	C. Umamaheswara Rao	Revathi; Krishneshwara Rao; Ravi Kale; Prashanth, Mihira; Vineeth; Aruvi Bala	Bommakku Creations	
O C T O B E R	8	Konda Polam	Krish	Panja Vaisshnav Tej; Rakul Preet Singh; Sai Chand; Kota Srinivasa Rao; Nassar; Annapurna; Hema	First Frame Entertainments	
O C T O B E R	14	Maha Samudram	Ajay Bhupathi	Sharwanand; Siddharth; Aditi Rao Hydari; Anu Emmanuel; Jagapathi Babu; Rao Ramesh	AK Entertainments	
O C T O B E R	15	Pelli SandaD	Gowri Ronanki	Roshan; Sree Leela; Rao Ramesh; Rajendra Prasad; Srinivasa Reddy; Posani Krishna Murali; Prakash Raj; Shakalaka Shankar; Fish Venkat	Arka Media Works	
O C T O B E R	15	Most Eligible Bachelor	Bhaskar	Akhil Akkineni; Pooja Hegde; Eesha Rebba; Aamani; Murali Sharma; Vennela Kishore; Jayaprakash; Pragathi; Amit Tiwari; Sudigali Sudheer	GA2 Pictures	
O C T O B E R	22	Asalem Jarigandi	Nuleti Veera Raghava	Sriram; Sanchita Padukone	Exodus Media	
O C T O B E R	22	Heads and Tales	Sai Krishna Enreddy	Sunil; Srividya Maharshi; Divya Sripada; Chandni Rao; Arun; Kivish Kautilya	S. K. N.	
O C T O B E R	29	Family Drama	Meher Tej	Suhas; Teja Kasarapu; Sruti Meher	Chashma Films; Noothana Bharathi Films	
O C T O B E R	29	Romantic	Anil Paduri	Akash Puri; Ketika Sharma; Ramya Krishnan; Makarand Deshpande	Puri Connects; Puri Jagannadh Touring Talkies	
O C T O B E R	29	Varudu Kaavalenu	Lakshmi Sowjanya	Naga Shaurya; Ritu Varma; Murali Sharma; Nadhiya; Vennela Kishore; Nadhiya; Praveen; Harsha Vardhan; Vaishnavi Chaitanya	Sithara Entertainments	
N O V	4	Manchi Rojulochaie	Maruthi	Santosh Sobhan; Mehreen Pirzada; Ajay Ghosh; Srinivasa Reddy; Vennela Kishore; Sudarshan; Satyam Rajesh; Saptagiri; Rajitha; Praveen; Harsha Chemudu	UV Concepts; Mass Movie Makers Llp	
N O V	12	Pushpaka Vimanam	Damodara	Anand Deverakonda; Saanve Megghana; Geeth Saini; Sunil; Naresh; Harsha Vardhan; Harsha Chemudu	Tanga productions llp King of the hill entertainment llp	
N O V	12	Raja Vikramarka	Sri Saripalli	Kartikeya Gummakonda; Tanya Ravichandran; Sudhakar Komakula; Sai Kumar; Pasupathy; Tanikella Bharani; Harsha Vardhan	Sree Chitra Movie Makers	
N O V	19	Adbhutham	Mallik Ram	Teja Sajja; Shivani Rajashekar; Satya	S Originals	
N O V	25	Drushyam 2	Jeethu Joseph	Venkatesh; Meena; Kruthika Jayakumar; Esther Anil; Sampath Raj; Nadhiya; Naresh; Poorna; Vinay Varma; Satyam Rajesh	Suresh Productions; Aashirvad Cinemas; RajKumar Theatres	
N O V	26	Anubhavinchu Raja	Sreenu Gavireddy	Raj Tarun; Kashish Khan; Posani Krishna Murali; Ajay; Ravi Krishna; Aadukalam Naren; Sudharshan; Aadarsh Balakrishna; Temper Vamsi; Ariyana	Annapurna Studios Pvt Ltd; Sree Ventakeswara Cinemas LLP	
N O V	26	1997	Dr. Mohan	Naveen Chandra; Dr. Mohan; Srikanth Iyengar	Eswar Parvathi Movies	
D E C	2	Akhanda	Boyapati Srinu	Nandamuri Balakrishna; Pragya Jaiswal; Jagapathi Babu; Srikanth; Poorna; Subbaraju; Ayyappa P. Sharma; Sravan; Prabhakar	Dwaraka Creations; Pen India Limited	
D E C	4	Skylab	Vishavak Khanderao	Nithya Menen; Satyadev; Rahul Ramakrishna; Tanikella Bharani; Tharun Bhascker	Byte Features; Nithya Menen Company	
D E C	10	Lakshya	Dheerendra Santhossh Jagarlapudi	Naga Shaurya; Ketika Sharma; Jagapathi Babu; Sachin Khedekar; Satya; Ravi Prakash	Sri Venkateswara Cinemas LLP; Northstar Entertainment Private Limited	
D E C	10	Gamanam	Sujana Rao	Shriya Saran; Suhas; Priyanka Jawalkar; Siva Kandukuri; Nithya Menen; Bithiri Sathi	Kria Film Corp; Kali Productions	
D E C	10	Sundarangudu	Vinay Babu	Krishna Sai, Mouryani, Isha, Mirchi Madhavi, Jeeva, Amit Tiwari, Mahaboob Basha, Junior Relangi.	MSK Pramidha Shree Films	
D E C	17	Pushpa: The Rise	Sukumar	Allu Arjun; Fahadh Faasil; Rashmika Mandanna; Dhananjay; Sunil; Anasuya Bharadwaj; Sritej	Mythri Movie Makers; Muttamsetty Media	
D E C	24	Shyam Singha Roy	Rahul Sankrityan	Nani; Sai Pallavi; Krithi Shetty; Madonna Sebastian; Jisshu Sengupta; Murali Sharma; Rahul Ravindran; Abhinav Gomatam; Manish Wadhwa	Niharika Entertainment	
D E C	24	WWW: Who Where Why	K. V. Guhan	Adith Arun; Shivani Rajashekar; Priyadarshi Pulikonda; Riyaz Khan; Harsha Chemudu; Satyam Rajesh; Divya Sripada	Ramantra creations	
D E C	25	Gudaputani	KM Kumar	Saptagiri; Raghu Kunche; Ananth	SRR Productions	
D E C	31	Arjuna Phalguna	Teja Marni	Sree Vishnu; Naresh; Sivaji Raja; Subbaraju; Devi Prasad; Rangasthalam Mahesh; Raj Kumar Kasireddy; Chaitanya Garikipati	Matinee Entertainment	
D E C	31	Senapathi	Pavan Sadineni	Rajendra Prasad; Naresh Agastya; Harsha Vardhan; Gnaneswari Kandregula; Satya Prakash; Rakendu Mouli; Ravi Josh; A Jeevan Kumar; Pavani Reddy; Rocky	Gold Box Entertainment; Aha	

== See also ==
- List of Telugu films of 2020
- Lists of Telugu-language films
- List of Telugu films of 2022
