= Rao Bahadur (film) =

2026 Indian Telugu language film

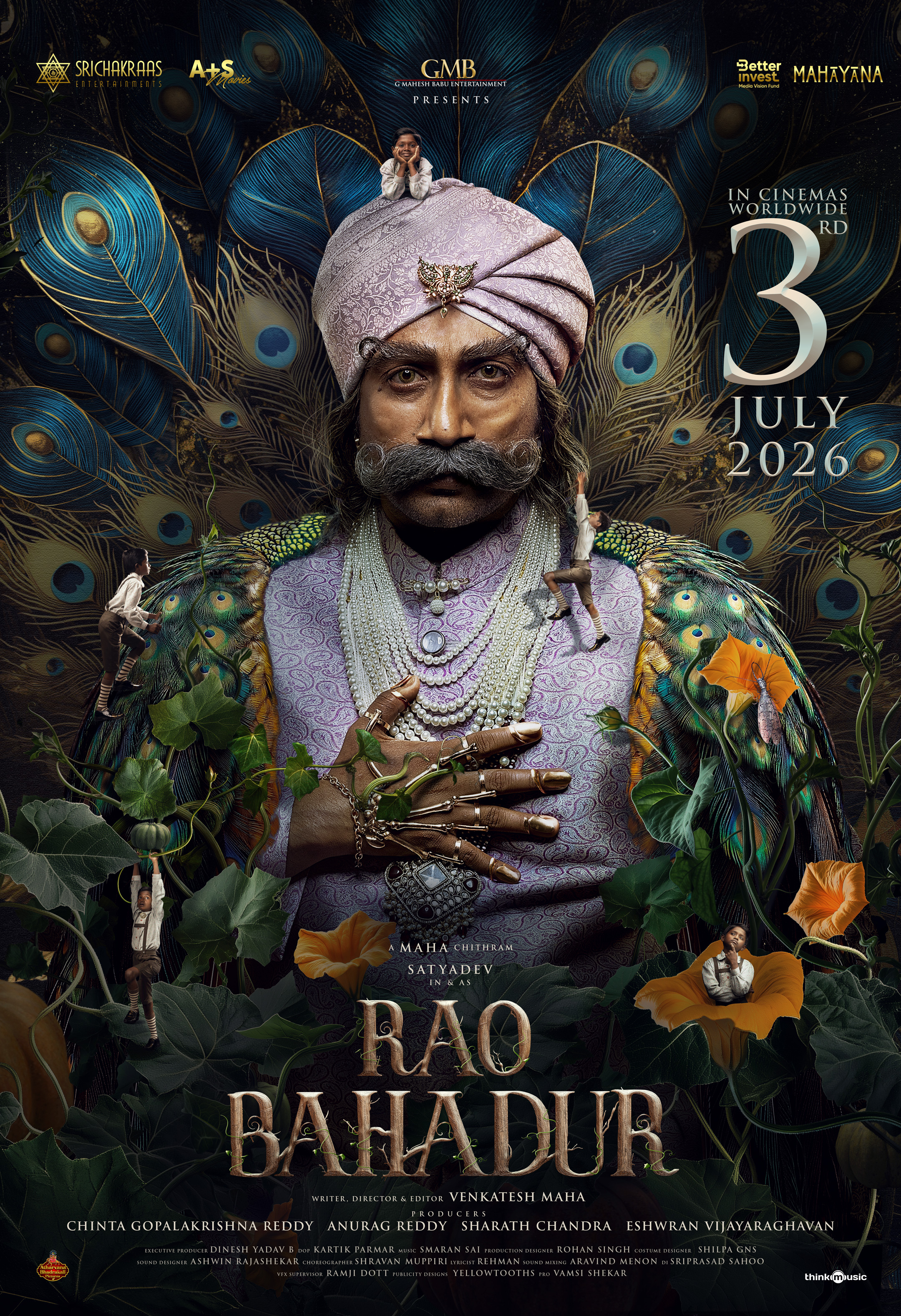
- Theatrical release poster
- Directed by: Venkatesh Maha
- Written by: Venkatesh Maha
- Produced by: Anurag Reddy; Sharath Chandra; Chinta Gopalakrishna Reddy; Eshwaran Vijayaraghavan
- Starring: Satyadev; Vikas Muppala; Deepa Thomas
- Cinematography: Kartik Parmar
- Edited by: Venkatesh Maha
- Music by: Smaran Sai
- Production companies: A+S Movies; Srichakraas Entertainments; Mahayana Motion Pictures; Better Invest Media Vision Fund
- Release date: 3 July 2026
- Running time: 170 minutes
- Country: India
- Language: Telugu
- Box office: ₹14.30 crore

Rao Bahadur is a 2026 Indian Telugu-language psychological dark comedy film written, directed and edited by Venkatesh Maha. The film stars Satyadev in the titular role alongside Vikas Muppala and Deepa Thomas. It is set against the backdrop of a fading aristocracy that blends elements of suspense, dark comedy, and magical realism.

The film was theatrically released on 3 July 2026. The film opened up to positive reviews but ended as a commercial failure, grossing over only ₹14.30 crore at the box office.

== Plot ==
Bhuvanam Ramappa Rao Bahadur is an aging, alcoholic, and mentally unstable aristocrat suffering from terminal liver cancer at his ancestral manor, Bhuvanalayam. Although doctors predict he has less than four months to live, Ramappa outlives his prognosis, sustained entirely by a parasitic obsession: the suspicion that his deceased younger son, Kusumappa aka Kusuma, was not his biological child. Ramappa's wife, Renuka, has retreated into a permanently dark room in self-imposed isolation, while their elder son, Lavanappa aka Lavana, struggles under the weight of his father's illness and his mother's emotional distance. Only Ramappa's close friend and family physician, Dr. Srinivasa Achari, is aware of his obsession.

Flashbacks reveal that in 1961, Ramappa was a progressive young man estranged from his conservative father. He returns home at Achari's request to care for his paralyzed father and falls in love with Renuka, a free-spirited nurse attending to him. Following his father's death, Renuka rejects Ramappa's marriage proposal, confessing she loves another man. Heartbroken and depressed, Ramappa experiences a surreal vision where the apparitions of his ancestors brainwash him to adhere to the clan's customs and uphold its lineage by producing heirs. Transformed by his obligation, Ramappa renews his proposal through Achari, and Renuka accepts.

Years later, Kusuma is born with dark skin, prompting widespread rumours of illegitimacy. Ramappa grows emotionally distant, domestically abusing Renuka and heavily favouring Lavana. After Lavana taunts his younger brother about his parentage, a devastated Kusuma attacks him, earning a severe rebuke from Ramappa that insults the legitimacy of his birth. Consequently, Kusuma commits suicide by drowning in the palace pond. Renuka blames Ramappa and retreats into isolation, while a guilt-ridden Ramappa slowly loses his sanity.

In the present, Ramappa learns about the advent of DNA testing. Driven by a vision of Kusuma, he emotionally blackmails Lavana into exhuming the grave under the pretext of a ritual, covertly stealing a portion of the skeletal remains. When Achari chides him for the desecration and explains the legal restrictions surrounding DNA testing, Ramappa turns his suspicion on Achari. Overhearing this, Lavana turns against the doctor. To clear his name, Achari orchestrates a false police complaint against Ramappa, accusing him of abducting Kusuma during infancy. However, a person named Ramakrishna accuses him of stealing his son and killing him.This prompts an official investigation by Police Inspector A. Jagannadhan and a court-ordered DNA test on the remains.

While awaiting the verdict, Ramappa slips into Yogic sleep. The court ultimately declares that Ramappa is indeed Kusuma's biological father; satisfied that his royal bloodline is unblemished, Ramappa dies with a triumphant smile.

At the funeral, Renuka confesses to Ramappa's corpse that Lavana is actually the illegitimate child. Her previous relationship had resulted in a pregnancy, and after being abandoned, she married Ramappa to secure a societal identity for her unborn child. Achari had forbidden her from revealing the truth, believing that "everyone has their own truths". Achari further confesses that Ramappa himself was adopted after his father’s biological child was stillborn and he was pressured by his ancestors' apparitions to produce an heir. Following the funeral, Lavanappa takes his place as the head of the manor. As he sits, banyan roots creep out from the ancestral portraits toward him, signaling his inheritance of the family’s hollow pride and destructive cycle of obsession.

== Cast ==
- Satyadev as Bhuvanam Ramappa Rao Bahadur
- Vikas Muppala as Dr. Achari, Rao Bahadur's friend
- Deepa Thomas as Renuka, Rao Bahadur's love-interest turned wife
- Bala Parasar as Achchamma, Rao Bahadur’s house-help
- Anand as Inspector A. Jagannadhan
- Pranay Vaka as Lavana, Rao Bahadur’s elder son
  - Venkat Showrya as child Lavana
- Master Kiran as Kusuma, Rao Bahadur’s younger son
- Kunal Kaushik as Siddhappa, Rao Bahadur’s father
- Monika Busam as Rao Bahadur’s mother
- Sattanna Satish as Driver Jangaiah
- Gowreesha Nookala as Suguna, Achchamma’s daughter-in-law
- Chanakya Tejas as Shivaachari, Achari’s father
- Venkatesh Maha as distant ancestor of Ramappa and founder of Bhuvanam Dynasty (cameo)

== Production ==
=== Development and casting ===
Venkatesh Maha spent five years developing the script, aiming to create a "Telugu story made for the world". Initially, he began writing the script with the title Marmaanuvu in 2020 and initially intended to make it with actor Rajasekhar as a psychological drama with horror elements. After some changes in the production and casting, he ultimately re-developed the story, cast Satyadev in the lead role, and rechristened the film as Rao Bahadur. The story marks a departure from his previous naturalistic films C/o Kancharapalem (2018) and Uma Maheswara Ugra Roopasya (2020), focusing instead on heightened visual layers and intricate detailing.

=== Filming ===
Satyadev had a rigorous regimen during the 85-day shooting schedule. To portray the aging aristocrat, the actor required five hours of daily prosthetic makeup. Principal photography involved the use of atmospheric lighting and unique colour palettes managed by cinematographer Kartik Parmar and production designer Rohan Singh.

== Music ==
The film's score and soundtrack were composed by Smaran Sai. The first single, "O Sundari," a Carnatic-inspired vintage melody, was released on April 15, 2026. It was performed by Vijay Yesudas with lyrics written by Rehman.

== Release ==
The film was theatrically released worldwide on 3 July 2026.

== Reception ==
=== Critical reception ===
Rao Bahudur received to positive reviews from critics. Sangeetha Devi of The Hindu said that the film is both entertaining and thought-provoking, and Satya Dev has delivered his career best performance. India Today's Janani K felt that Rao Bahadur is a "sincere and bold attempt at art cinema" within the Telugu film industry, and it carried genuine social commentary without ever getting preachy about it. In his review for Cinema Express, Suresh Kavirayani opined that while the central conflict is strong, the film suffered from slow pace and screenplay felt stagnant for much of the runtime.
