= Venkatesh Maha =

Indian film director, screenwriter and actor

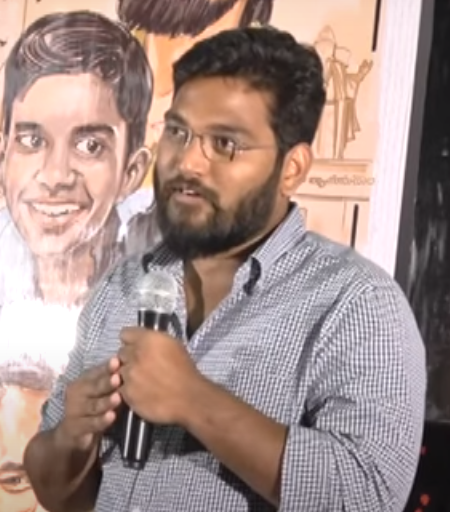
- Maha in 2018
- Born: Vijayawada, Andhra Pradesh, India
- Occupations: Director; Screenwriter; Actor; Critic
- Years active: 2011–present
- Organization: Mahayana Motion Pictures LLP
- Website: www.mahayana.co.in

Venkatesh Maha is an Indian film director, screenwriter and actor who works in Telugu cinema. He's known for directing films including C/o Kancharapalem (2018) and Uma Maheswara Ugra Roopasya (2020).

== Career ==
Maha left his house at the age of sixteen and worked various jobs. He worked as a spot boy for the film Teen Maar (2011) before he made his acting debut with Aakasame Haddu that same year. He made his directorial debut with the film C/o Kancharapalem (2018) which was shot in the suburb of the same name. The cast of the film comprised entirely of newcomers. Regarding his work on the film, one critic noted, "Full marks to Venkatesh for not only coming up with a different kind of film but successfully carrying off the experiment of roping in locals for a film which is about themselves" whilst another stated, "If the director Venkatesh Maha is the brain behind this idea, he deserves credit yes".

His next film was Uma Maheswara Ugra Roopasya (2020), a remake of the Malayalam film Maheshinte Prathikaaram. The film features Satyadev in the lead role and was shot extensively in the Araku valley. Regarding the cast of the film, a critic opined, "And a big shout to Venkatesh Maha’s casting choices, which makes the movie more relatable". In August 2021, Maha started Write Right Club for creative writers along with Puja Kolluru and other team members.

He collaborated with Satyadev again in the psychological drama film Rao Bahadur, which released in July 2026. Presented by Mahesh Babu and Namrata Shirodkar, it was jointly produced by Anurag Reddy, Sharath Chandra, Chinta Gopalakrishna Reddy, and Eshwaran Vijayaraghavan.

== Filmography ==
- All films are in Telugu unless otherwise noted.

Key
†	Denotes films that have not yet been released

Film and television
Year	Title	Director	Writer	Producer	Notes	Ref.
2018	C/o Kancharapalem	Yes	Yes	No		
2020	Uma Maheswara Ugra Roopasya	Yes	Yes	No		
2022	Swarna	No	No	Yes	Short film	
2022	Modern Love Hyderabad	Yes	No	No	Amazon Prime Video series; episode 6	
2023	Martin Luther King	No	Yes	Yes	Also actor	
2024	Ambajipeta Marriage Band	No	No	Yes	Co-producer	
2026	Rao Bahadur	Yes	Yes	No		

Acting roles
Year	Title	Role	Notes	Ref.
2011	Aakasame Haddu	Narayana's friend		
2012	Cameraman Gangatho Rambabu	News audience member		
2014	Manam	Unknown		
2018	Mahanati	Assistant Director Shaukar		
2020	Uma Maheswara Ugra Roopasya	Tea vendor	Cameo appearance	
2022	Stand Up Rahul	Hriday	Extended cameo	
2022	Ante Sundaraniki	Joseph		
2023	Anger Tales	Ranga	Disney+ Hotstar series	
2023	Ustaad	Surya's father	Cameo	
2023	Martin Luther King	Loki		
2025	Mirai	Vikram		
2026	Rao Bahadur	Bhuvanam Ramappa's ancestor		

== Awards and nominations ==
Year	Award	Category	Work	Result	Ref.
2019	Filmfare Awards South	Best Director – Telugu	C/o Kancharapalem	Nominated	
2021	South Indian International Movie Awards	Best Director – Telugu	Uma Maheswara Ugra Roopasya	Nominated	
2025	Telangana Gaddar Film Awards	Third Best Feature Film	C/o Kancharapalem	Won	
