= Sharanya =

Sharanya is a given name. Notable people with the name include:

- Sharanya Pradeep (born 1992), Indian actress
- Sharanya Srinivas (born 1991), Indian vocalist
