= Bhamakalapam 2 =

- Poster
- Directed by: Abhimanyu Tadimeti
- Written by: Abhimanyu Tadimeti
- Produced by: Bhogavalli Bapineedu; Sudheer Edara
- Starring: Priyamani; Sharanya Pradeep; Raghu Mukherjee; Seerat Kapoor
- Cinematography: Deepak Yaragera
- Edited by: Viplav Nyshadam
- Music by: Prashanth R Vihari
- Production company: Dream Farmers
- Distributed by: Aha
- Release date: 16 February 2024
- Running time: 128 minutes
- Country: India
- Language: Telugu

Bhamakalapam 2 is a 2024 Indian Telugu-language dark crime comedy thriller film directed by Abhimanyu Tadimeti. A sequel to Bhamakalapam (2022), the film features Priyamani, Sharanya Pradeep, Raghu Mukherjee, and Seerat Kapoor.

Like the film's predecessor, the title and the central theme of the film is inspired from Bhamakalapam, a traditional dance form of Andhra Pradesh which refers to the story of a headstrong, proud Satyabhama. Bhamakalapam 2 was premiered on 16 February 2024 on Aha two years after the previous film.

== Cast ==
- Priyamani as Anupama Mohan, an ambitious homemaker who runs cookery channel on YouTube
- Sharanya Pradeep as Shilpa, a maid in Anupama's apartment; trusted aid of Anupama.
- Raghu Mukherjee as Sadanand, an intelligence officer
- Seerat Kapoor as Zubeida, an actress
- Pradeep Rudra as Mohan, Anupama's husband
- Anuj Gurwara as Antony Lobo, the CEO of an hotel chain
- Nanda Gopal
- Rakesh Rachakonda
- Sundeep Ved

== Soundtrack ==
The soundtrack was composed by Prashanth R Vihari.

Track listing
No.	Title	Lyrics	Singer(s)	Length
1.	"Dangerous Housewife"	Rehman, Aaqueel	Yazin Nizar, Prashanth R Vihari, Ritesh G Rao, Aaqueel	2:12
2.	"Paruge Vintha Paruge"	Rehman	Ritesh G Rao	3:26
3.	"Swapna Sundari"	Rehman	Damini Bhatla, Lakshmi Meghana, Manisha Maganti	4:40
Total length:				10:18

== Reception ==
A critic from The New Indian Express wrote that "After a point, it becomes clear that Bhamakalapam is simply going for cheap thrills, and that logical consistency is not its strong suit, or even a major concern". A critic from The Hindu wrote that "Bhamakalapam 2 shines because it is aware of its limitations. It understands that it is a low-stakes heist drama and within that framework, manages to keep us invested almost till the final segment".
