= Aarambham =

Aarambham may refer to:

- Aarambham (1982 film), an Indian Malayalam film written by Cochin Haneefa
- Aarambham (2024 film), an Indian Telugu-language science fiction drama written and directed by Ajay Nag V

== See also ==
- Arrambam, a 2013 Indian Tamil-language action thriller film
