= Bhamakalapam (film) =

2022 film by Abhimanyu

- Poster
- Directed by: Abhimanyu Tadimeti
- Written by: Abhimanyu Tadimeti
- Produced by: Bhogavalli Bapineedu; Sudheer Edara; Bharat Kamma (presenter)
- Starring: Priyamani; Kishore; John Vijay; Shanthi Rao; Sharanya Pradeep
- Cinematography: Deepak Yaragera
- Edited by: Viplav Nyshadam
- Music by: Mark K. Robin
- Production company: SVCC Digital
- Distributed by: Aha
- Release date: 11 February 2022
- Running time: 133 minutes
- Country: India
- Language: Telugu

Bhamakalapam is a 2022 Indian Telugu-language dark crime comedy thriller film written and directed by Abhimanyu Tadimeti. Produced by SVCC Digital, the film stars Priyamani alongside Kishore, John Vijay, Shanthi Rao, and Sharanya Pradeep. The film's soundtrack and score is composed by Justin Prabhakaran and Mark K. Robin, respectively.

The title and the central theme of the film is inspired from Bhamakalapam, a traditional dance form of Andhra Pradesh which refers to the story of a headstrong, proud Satyabhama. Bhamakalapam was premiered on 11 February 2022 on Aha. A sequel Bhamakalapam 2 was released in 2024.

== Plot ==
The film opens with a young kid listening to a preacher at a spiritual gathering talking about the story of a special egg. According to the story, there was an egg that Mary brought to people after Jesus was crucified to indicate the return of him in 3 days. In the present, an egg is stolen from a museum in Kolkata, which is worth ₹200 crores. It is one of the few precious Easter eggs made by a Russian jewellery maker, Faberge, which used to be owned by the kings of bygones. With the stolen egg, Mani and his associate, the robbers of the egg, are on their way to meet their ring leader, Nayar, but meet with an accident on a bridge. The egg falls off the bridge and lands on a poultry truck amongst edible eggs. Nayar kills the associate and orders Mani to find the egg or meet the same fate.

Anupama is a nosy neighbour in an apartment complex who lives with her husband, Mohan, and son, Varun. She is a budding chef and does cooking videos on YouTube. However, she is a highly nosy person who is too interested in other people's affairs, always observing others through the window of her apartment and gathering information from Shilpa, who works as a maid in the apartments. Feroz, an owner of a poultry shop, finds the Easter egg, and decides to hide it in his home. He lives in the same apartment society as Anupama. Mani knows that Feroz has the egg through his assistant. He and his wife have an argument one night and the following day, she is not seen home. Anupama, who observed the argument through the window, suspects something and decides to know what happened.

With the help of Shilpa, she manages to get a fake key and stumbles upon the dead body of Feroz inside. Mani, who is there to collect the egg, attacks her. In a scuffle, she stabs Mani with a fork, which makes him unconscious. She drags his body into her house and hides it in the kitchen. The police arrive at the apartment the following day to investigate Feroz's murder, led by SI Pallavi. They suspect Mani of killing Feroz and fleeing away. On the other hand, Nayar's men steal the apartment complex' CCTV footage, where they see Anupama carrying Mani's body. Nayar blackmails Anupama to find the egg and bring it to him. She cannot find it in Feroz's house or in Mani's pockets. However, in an attempt to smuggle Mani's body out with the help of an associate, she gets caught by a corrupt police constable.

After throwing the body in a river packed in a suitcase, the constable demands money from her, stopping their vehicle on her way home. However, Nayar gets him killed and orders Anupama to bring the egg to him and kidnaps Varun. It is revealed that Feroz's wife is the one who stole the egg. She is a disciple of Daniel Babu, a religious leader. He believes that the egg is the same egg which was spoken about in the story of Mary and Jesus. He and his disciples are awaiting the descent of God to Earth. He is the one who actually killed Feroz and now also kills another woman in the apartment who finds out the truth. Anupama recollects that she saw a locket in Feroz's house while searching for the egg, which actually belongs to Daniel. With the help of Shilpa, Anupama hands over Daniel to Nayar and goes to his house in the search of the egg.

The police discover Mani's body in the river along with a knife. Pallavi figures out that it is the same knife Anupama uses in her cooking videos. As Anupama finds the egg and comes out of Daniel's house, Pallavi catches her and suspects her of the murder. Meanwhile, Daniel escapes Nayar by killing all of Nayar's men and reaches his house. He also kills Pallavi and starts firing at Anupama. She manages to survive after taking a bullet. Meanwhile, Mohan arrives with the police and they take Daniel into custody. The film ends with a message: "Not to await the God and believe in human power".

== Cast ==
- Priyamani as Anupama Mohan, an ambitious homemaker who runs cookery channel on YouTube
- Kishore as Father Daniel Babu, Christian religious preacher who becomes lunatic.
- John Vijay as Nayar, a smuggler
- Sharanya Pradeep as Shilpa, a maid in Anupama's apartment; trusted aid of Anupama.
- Shanthi Rao as SI P. Pallavi, an investigation officer
- Pradeep Rudra as Mohan, Anupama's husband
- Ranga Raja Pandiyan as Head Constable Samual Josesh
- Pammi Sai as Chinna Rao
- Nellore Neeraja
- Ravinder Bommakanti
- Sameera
- Balaji
- M S Raaja as Mani
- Sai Mukhesh

== Production ==
Bhama Kalapam marks Priyamani's first web film. The film was primarily shot indoors owing to the restrictions due to COVID-19 pandemic. Filming took place predominantly at a gated community in Hyderabad and was shot in 25 days.

== Reception ==
The Times of India gave a critical rating of 3 out of 5, writing "The film had all the ingredients of a great thriller comedy, but its ambitions were let down by the overarching runtime and lack of brevity" and further praised Priyamani's performance stating: "Priyamani as Anupama proves to be a saving grace and breezes through effortlessly. The audience would continue watching the film to root for her character". Sangeetha Devi Dundoo of The Hindu felt that "In the first few minutes, as the film finds its feet, it is hard not to be reminded of the 2018 Hindi film Andhadhun, even if faintly. A lamb crosses the path and a car meets with an accident that changes the course of things. The plot bears no resemblance to Andhadhun but this film exists in a zone that is similar to that widely appreciated macabre crime comedy". On a final note, she wrote that "Bhamakalapam is an interesting departure from mainstream Telugu film tropes".

Asianet praised Abhimanyu's writing of screenplay and story, Priyamani's performance and the background score.
