= Oh Bhama Ayyo Rama =

Indian Telugu-language romantic drama film

- Theatrical release poster
- Directed by: Ram Godhala
- Written by: Ram Godhala
- Produced by: Harish Nalla
- Starring: Suhas; Malavika Manoj
- Cinematography: S. Manikandan
- Edited by: Bhavin M. Shah
- Music by: Radhan
- Production company: V ARTS
- Release date: 11 July 2025
- Running time: 155 minutes
- Country: India
- Language: Telugu

Oh Bhama Ayyo Rama (transl. Oh beloved, alas Rama) is a 2025 Indian Telugu-language romantic drama film written and directed by Ram Godhala. The film stars Suhas and Malavika Manoj alongside Anita Hassanandani, Ali, Ravinder Vijay, and Babloo Prithiveeraj in supporting roles.

== Plot ==
Ram loses his mother at a very young age and lives with his uncle. One fine day, he meets Satyabhama and gets close to her. When everything seems to be going as planned, Ram's past resurfaces and breaks up his love story. What is that past, and what issues did it create in Ram's love story, is the basic crux of the film.

== Cast ==
- Suhas as Ram
- Malavika Manoj as Satyabhama
- Ali as Ram's uncle and Meenakshi’s brother
- Anita Hassanandani as Meenakshi, Ram's mother
- Ravindra Vijay as Gautham, Ram's father
- Babloo Prithiveeraj as Surya, Satyabhama’s father
- Prabhas Sreenu as Lecturer
- Raghu Karumanchi as Guy in stories
- Annapurna as Satyabhama’s grandmother
- Roopa Sravan as Satyabhama’s mother
- Sathvik Anand as Love Guru, Ram’s friend
- Moin as Ram’s friend
- Karthik Prasad as Manoj, Satyabhama’s alliance
- Keshav Deepak as Manoj’s father
- Nayani Pavani as Kruthi, Satyabhama’s bestfriend
- Harish Shankar as Himself (Extended Cameo)
- Maruthi as Himself (Cameo appearance)

== Music ==
Oh Bhama Ayyo Rama

Soundtrack album by Radhan
- Released: 2025
- Genre: Feature film soundtrack
- Length: 25:32
- Language: Telugu
- Label: Aditya Music

Radhan chronology
Dear Uma (2025)	Oh Bhama Ayyo Rama (2025)
External audio
- Oh Bhama Ayyo Rama – Jukebox on YouTube

The music was composed by Radhan.

Track listing
No.	Title	Lyrics	Singer(s)	Length
1.	"Oh Bhama Ayyo Rama"	Sri Harsha Emani	Sarath Santosh	3:31
2.	"Ramachandhrude"	Sri Harsha Emani, Pardhu Sannidhiraju	Tippu, Harini	5:06
3.	"Gully Step"	Kasarla Shyam	Suhas	2:58
4.	"Amma Song"	Balaji	Pranavi	3:11
5.	"Na Chelive"	M. Venkat Kalyan	Karthik	4:50
6.	"Sajni Re"	Rambabu Gosala	Sarath Santosh	5:56
Total length:				25:32

== Release ==
Oh Bhama Ayyo Rama was released theatrically on 11 July 2025. The film was released on Amazon Prime Video and ETV Win on 1 August 2025.

== Reception ==
Paul Nicodemus of The Times of India rated the film 2.5/5 stars and wrote, "In the end, Oh Bhama Ayyo Rama is a film that works in parts. Its performances, music, and premise are engaging, but it falters when it tries to go deeper without the narrative precision to support it." B. H. Harsh of Cinema Express gave it 2/5 stars and wrote, "Despite earnest performances from Suhas and Malavika Manoj, the film is never consistent in its tone and gets increasingly dull in the second half".

SN of Telugucinema.com rated the film 1.75/5 and wrote, "“Oh Bhama Ayyo Rama” is bereft of strong story, emotional heft, or engaging narration. To make matters worse, Suhas delivers a subpar performance that only drags the film further down. It is, in no uncertain terms, a thoroughly dull." Srivathsan Nadadhur of The Hindu wrote, "Oh Bhama Ayyo Rama doesn't even do the bare minimum you seek from a popcorn entertainer. Everything about it is so ordinary and forgettable."
