= Nimtoh =

2019 film

- Film poster
- Directed by: Saurav Rai
- Produced by: Sanjay Gulati; Neeraj Panday
- Starring: Pravesh Gurung
- Cinematography: Appu Prabhakar
- Edited by: Jishnu Sen
- Production company: Crawling Angel Films
- Release date: 20 October 2019 (Mumbai Film Festival)
- Running time: 85 minutes
- Country: India
- Language: Nepali

Nimtoh, released internationally as Invitation, is a 2019 Indian Nepali-language drama film directed by debutante Saurav Rai and stars Pravesh Gurung.

The film was part of the NFDC Film Bazaar Work In Progress Lab, 2018, where it won the Prasad DI and Moviebuff DCP Award. The film also got selected for the Hong Kong Asian Film Financing Forum, Work In Progress Lab, where it won the HAF Goes to Cannes Award.

Nimtoh had its international premiere at the Rotterdam International Film Festival, 2020 in the Bright Future Main Programme Section. It won the Grand Jury Prize for Screenwriting in the India Gold Section at the Jio MAMI International Film Festival, 2019. The film further travelled to NARA International Film Festival, 2020, Japan. Nimtoh was the closing film of the 33rd Images Festival, Toronto, Canada.

== Cast ==
- Pravesh Gurung as Tashi
- Chandra Dewan
- Suni Rai
- Teresa Rai
- Digbijay Singh Rai

== Production ==
Many of Saurav Rai's family members play supporting roles in the film, which was shot in Rai's village near Darjeeling. The film is about a theft that occurs during a wedding.

== Release ==
The film was screened at Kazhcha-Niv Indie Film Fest 2019 and the Cannes Film Festival 2019. The film was also one of ten films selected to be part of the India Gold competition at the MAMI Mumbai Film Festival 2019.The Hollywood Reporter wrote that "Like the aesthetic choice to keep events offscreen, one has to wonder how such a heavy veil over the narrative advances the story, when a straightforward account would have deepened our understanding of the characters’ relationships and maybe offered emotional inroads into a tale that tends to be empathetic, yes, but also dry and distanced".

== Awards and nominations ==
- NFDC Film Bazaar 2018 - Prasad Labs DI Award and Moviebuff Appreciation Award - Won
- MAMI Mumbai Film Festival 2019 - Jury Award for Screenwriting - Won
