= Ravindra Vijay =

Indian actor

- Born: Bangalore, Karnataka, India
- Occupation: Actor
- Website: ravindravijay.com

Ravindra Vijay is an Indian actor who primarily appears in Telugu and Tamil films, and television shows. After beginning his career as a theatre actor, Ravindra had a career breakthrough with appearances in Odu Raja Odu (2018) and Uma Maheshwara Ugra Roopasya (2020).

== Early life and career ==
Born and raised in Bangalore, Ravindra is a polyglot and is fluent in Kannada, Tamil, Telugu and English. He completed a medical degree at Bangalore Medical College and Research Institute and is a qualified doctor. During his time as a student, he took on acting as a hobby and worked on college productions. In 2005, he joined the Bengaluru-based theatre troupe Rafiki, and began working on street plays. Soon after he quit his career as a doctor, Ravindra took on odd jobs to earn, and briefly worked at an oil rig. By 2011, he became a full-time theatre actor.

In the mid-2010s, he moved to Chennai and joined the theatre troupe, Perch. He acted in several of the collective's plays, such as Under the Mangosteen Tree, which was inspired by Vaikom Muhammad Basheer's short stories. He also appeared in the plays How to Skin a Giraffe and Jujubee, a play for children. He is part of the trio that performs Kira Kozhambu, a play based on writer Ki Rajanarayanan's folk tales. Vijay acted in the play with Anandsami and Kalieaswari Srinivasan in Coimbatore. And re-enacted the same play with Maya S. Krishnan reprising Srinivasan's part in Chennai. The play solely featured the three actors and a bench. The play was based on Ki. Rajanarayanan's collection of short stories titled Nattuppura Kadhai Kalanjiyam, with Anandsami reprising his role from the original play. A critic stated that "Actors Anand Sami, Maya S. Krishnan and Ravindra Vijay were in their elements with their seamless blend of art and entertainment".

Thereafter, he received an offer to appear as the brother of Nassar's character in Nishanth Ravindaran's black comedy film Odu Raja Odu (2018). He then continued to work on films, notably appearing in Kamal Haasan's production Kadaram Kondan (2019), and Dharala Prabhu (2020). Ravindra appeared in the Telugu film Uma Maheshwara Ugra Roopasya (2020), portraying the character of Jognath, the catalyst for the film's revenge-based narrative. The popularity of his role in the film led to audience creating memes on the character.

In 2021, Ravindra was seen in Amazon Prime's The Family Man portraying a Chennai-based intelligence officer.

== Filmography ==
Key
†	Denotes films that have not yet been released

Year	Title	Role	Language	Ref.
2016	Irudhi Suttru	Genghis Khan boxer	Tamil	
2016	Saala Khadoos	Genghis Khan boxer	Hindi	
2018	Odu Raja Odu	Chella Muthu	Tamil	
2019	Kadaram Kondan	Umar Ahamed	Tamil	
2020	Dharala Prabhu	Manoj Kumar	Tamil	
2020	Uma Maheswara Ugra Roopasya	Jognath	Telugu	
2021	Anbirkiniyal	Ravindran	Tamil	
2021	Ishq: Not A Love Story	Madhav	Telugu	
2022	Mishan Impossible	Vikram	Telugu	
2022	Kinnerasani	Jayadev	Telugu	
2023	Ustaad	Mechanic	Telugu	
2023	Jawan	Mukund Menon IAS	Hindi	
2023	Keedaa Cola	CEO	Telugu	
2023	Mangalavaaram	RMP Viswanatham	Telugu	
2023	Sam Bahadur	Swamy	Hindi	
2024	Jai Ganesh	Mohan Selvaraj	Malayalam	
2024	Aarambham	Chaitanya	Telugu	
2024	Raghu Thatha	Tamilselvan	Tamil	
2025	HIT: The Third Case	Samuel Joseph	Telugu	
2025	Kothapallilo Okappudu	Appanna	Telugu	
2025	Oh Bhama Ayyo Rama	Gautham	Telugu	
2025	Ghaati	Kaashtal Naidu	Telugu	
2025	Kaantha	Martin Prabhakaran	Tamil	
2025	Champion	Shoiabullah Khan	Telugu	
2026	Theertharoopa Thandeyavarige	Shivashankar	Kannada	
2026	Cheekatilo	Chinna Babu	Telugu	
2026	Mandaadi	Singaram	Tamil	

=== Television ===
Year	Title	Role	Language	Network	Notes	Ref.
2021	The Family Man	Muthu Pandian	Hindi	Amazon Prime Video	Season 2; Web Debut	
2023	Anger Tales	Husband	Telugu	Disney+Hotstar	Segment: Afternoon Nap	
2023	Dhootha	SI Ajay Ghosh	Telugu	Amazon Prime Video		
2023	Vyooham	CI Akbar Jalal	Telugu	Amazon Prime Video		
2024	Bahishkarana	President Shivaya	Telugu	ZEE5		
2024	Brinda	SI N. Sarathi	Telugu	SonyLIV		
2025	Mayasabha	Pothineni Ramesh	Telugu	SonyLIV		
