= Mishan Impossible =

2022 Telugu film by Swaroop R. S. J.

- Theatrical Release poster
- Directed by: Swaroop R. S. J.
- Written by: Swaroop R. S. J.
- Produced by: Niranjan Reddy; Anvesh Reddy
- Starring: Taapsee Pannu; Harsh Roshan; Bhannu Prakshan; Jayateertha Molugu
- Cinematography: Deepak Yaragera
- Edited by: Ravi Teja Girijala
- Music by: Mark K. Robin
- Production companies: Matinee Entertainment; PA Entertainments
- Release date: 1 April 2022
- Country: India
- Language: Telugu

Mishan Impossible is a 2022 Indian Telugu-language comedy thriller film written and directed by Swaroop R. S. J. of Agent Sai Srinivasa Athreya fame. It stars Taapsee Pannu and child actors Harsh Roshan, Bhannu Prakasan, and Jayateertha Molugu. The film is a fictional account of a true incident that took place in 2014, in Patna. Three school kids, from rural Andhra Pradesh, decide to get rich, quickly, by helping catch and turning over, Dawood Ibrahim, to the authorities.

The film was released on 1 April 2022 and received mixed reviews from critics and audience.

== Plot ==
Sailaja plans and executes successful assassination of a corrupt Tamil Nadu minister named Krishna, a known criminal involved in Child trafficking, much to the surprise of her team member Vikram. Satish, a cop was also working with them. In a village near Tirupati, Andhra Pradesh called Vadamalapeta, there are three boys named Ragupathi, Raghava, and Rajaram. Collectively they refer themselves as RRR. Ragupathi hears about India's most wanted criminal Dawood Ibrahim, on the news and the reward for catching him to be ₹50 lakh (US$52,000), where he and his friends plan to capture Dawood for the reward money and they name the mission Mishan Impossible. Their plan is to go to Mumbai and capture Dawood.

Meanwhile, Sailaja sets eyes on her next target Ram Shetty, who was also involved in child trafficking. Through an informer embedded in Shetty's criminal organization by Satish, she learns his next major operation will be in Mumbai. She hatches a plan to expose him on live television so that she can prevent support from corrupt politicians in Shetty's payroll to influence his criminal proceedings. The RRR gang mistakenly board a lorry for Bangalore instead of Mumbai on the day of their journey. On their way to Mumbai, Sailaja and Vikram learn that Shetty's operation is in Mangalore not Mumbai. Unfortunately, they also meet with a minor accident due to sudden change of route by Sailaja. RRR struggle on the streets of Bangalore, where they end up losing all their money in their futile search for Dawood.

However, RRR witnesses the killing of the informant who has been supplying Sailaja and her team with the information. Some time later, Rajaram is abducted by Shetty's child trafficking gang. Ragupathi and Raghava are scared and start blaming each other for their situation. Sailaja finds them and offers money so that they can go home. However, they refuse to leave without finding Rajaram. After listening to their naive plan of capturing Dawood, Sailaja admires their courage. She manages to convince the children to aid her in capturing "Dawood". Raghupati and Raghava also get themselves kidnapped. On their way to the Shetty's child trafficking house, Raghava marks the way with broken pieces of Rubik's Cube. Once inside, they reunite with Rajaram.

Sailaja, Satish and Vikram manage to smuggle a recording device to the trafficking house. RRR plant them in important locations and capture the evidence of trafficking. They also gather the location of the beach where next operation of Shetty supposedly takes place, but they are wrong. On the day of abduction they are loaded into vans to take to the nearby beach. From there, they are to be trafficked to Dubai. They leave behind the wrong beach location and the evidence they gathered for Sailaja and her team to find them. Vikram and Sailaja find the trafficking house with the help of Rubik's Cube pieces left earlier by Raghava. At the trafficking house, they get the evidence and location of beach. Satish also manages to get full police support thanks to the evidence.

The police arrive at the location provided by RRR and successfully rescue all the children due to last minute change of plans by Ram Shetty. He had changed the route to the location shared by RRR. RRR's parents are proud of their children's bravery and role in nabbing Shetty.

== Cast ==
- Master Harsh Roshan as Raghupathi
- Master Bhanu Prakshan as Raghava
- Master Jayateertha Molugu as Rajaram
- Taapsee Pannu as Sailaja
- Ravindra Vijay as Vikram
- Hareesh Peradi as Ram Shetty
- Rishab Shetty as Khaleel
- Harsha Vardhan as class teacher
- Satyam Rajesh as security guard
- Madhusudhan Rao as a corrupt Tamil Minister Krishna.
- Suhas as Gilaani
- Sandeep Raj as Farooq
- Viva Harsha as booking clerk
- Chanakya Tejaas as Sathish
- Rangatham as Raghupathi's father
- Kancherapalem Kishore as Raghava's father
- Sharanya Pradeep as Raghupathi's mother
- Bindu Chandramouli as Raghava's mother
- Surabhi Deepthi as Rajaram's mother

== Release ==
The film was released worldwide on 1 April 2022. Post-theatrical streaming rights were acquired by Netflix and was premiered on 29 April 2022.

== Reception ==
A reviewer from The Hans India gave the film a rating of 3/5 and wrote "Though director took an interesting plot screenplay can be much better. Few illogical scenes and climax disappoints audience". Neeshita Nyayapati of The Times of India gave the film a rating of 2.5/5 and wrote "Mishan Impossible sounds great on paper and has all the makings of a crime comedy that’ll leave you in splits but also move you. But in reality, Swaroop only manages to do that in bits and pieces". Latha Srinivasan of Firstpost gave the film a rating of 2.5/5 and wrote "One must commend Taapsee for taking a chance on this film and giving it her all albeit in a small role. Unfortunately, Mishan Impossible fails to launch".

Murali Krishna CH of The New Indian Express gave the film a rating of 2/5 and wrote "The film could have been a thrilling ride on the wild side of humour with such talents at their best – only if the writing and the execution also scaled such heights". Siby Jeyya of India Herald stated "The movie 'Mishan Impossible' is a meaningless irritant to the audience". Sangeetha Devi Dundoo of The Hindu stated "The endearing small-town milieu and sharp humour outweigh the loopholes in this crime comedy". Gabbeta Ranjith Kumar of The Indian Express stated "This Swaroop RSJ starring Taapsee Pannu and a bunch of talented kids makes for a delightful watch". L Ravichander of Telangana Today stated "Mishan Impossible is a whiff of fresh air in the context of Tollywood to a cinema".
