= Gorre Puranam =

2024 Indian Telugu-language film by Bobby Varma

- Theatrical release poster
- Directed by: Bobby Varma
- Written by: Bobby Varma
- Produced by: Praveen Reddy
- Starring: Suhas; Posani Krishna Murali; Raghu Karumanchi
- Cinematography: Suresh Sarangam
- Edited by: Vamsi Krishna Raavi
- Music by: Pawan Ch
- Production company: Focal Cinemas
- Release date: 21 September 2024
- Running time: 130 minutes
- Country: India
- Language: Telugu

Gorre Puranam is a 2024 Indian Telugu-language crime drama film written and directed by Bobby Varma. The film features Suhas, Posani Krishna Murali and Raghu Karumanchi in important roles.

The film was released on 21 September 2024.

== Cast of Gorre Puranam ==
- Suhas as Ravi
- Posani Krishna Murali as judge
- Raghu Karumanchi
- Jenny as police officer
- Kamal
- Surendar Reddy
- Yogi
- Silver Suresh
- Karan Vijay
- Madhu Prakash
- Meher
- Vishika Kota
- Tharun Bhascker in a voice role as the Sheep

== Music ==
The background score and soundtrack is composed by Pawan Ch. The audio rights were acquired by Sony Music.

All music is composed by Pawan Ch.

Track list
No.	Title	Lyrics	Singer(s)	Length
1.	"Na naaa nee abba"	vosey karama	ninnu korukunthunte naa pranam	3:55
2.	"Bhale Bhale"	Chaitanya Prasad	Sarthak Kalyani	2:52
3.	"Ila Katha Mafiliya"	Suresh Banisetti	Suryansh	3:32

== Release ==
Gorre Puranam was initially scheduled released on 20 September 2024, but was released a day later, that is, on 21 September 2024. Post-theatrical digital streaming rights were acquired by Aha and premiered on 11 October 2024. It was later premiered on Amazon Prime Video in November 2024.

== Reception ==
Citing it as a "bold attempt", Deccan Chronicle gave a positive review with particular praise for Suhas' performance and the plot. Praising the performance of Suhas and the screenplay, Times Now gave a rating of 2.5 out of 5.
