= Anger Tales =

Indian drama series

- Promotional poster
- Genre: Drama
- Written by: Karthikeya Karedla; Prabhala Tilak
- Directed by: Prabhala Tilak
- Starring: Bindu Madhavi; Tharun Bhascker; Phani Acharya; Venkatesh Maha; Suhas; Madonna Sebastian; Ravindra Vijay
- Composer: Smaran
- Country of origin: India
- Original language: Telugu
- No. of seasons: 1
- No. of episodes: 4

Production
- Executive producer: Uday Chauhan
- Producers: Sridhar Reddy; Suhas
- Cinematography: Apoorva Gharpure; AJ Aaron; Vinod Bangari; Venkat R Shakhamuri; Amardeep
- Editor: Kodati Pavan Kalyan
- Camera setup: Multi-camera

Original release
- Network: Disney+ Hotstar
- Release: 9 March 2023

Anger Tales is an Indian Telugu-language drama television series written by Prabhala Tilak and Karthikeya Karedla. It is directed by Prabhala Tilak. The series was produced by Suhas and Sreedar Reddy under Disney+ Hotstar Productions. It stars Bindu Madhavi, Phani Acharya, Suhas, Tharun Bhascker, Venkatesh Maha, Madonna Sebastian and Ravindra Vijay. It premiered on Disney+ Hotstar on 9 March 2023.

== Plot ==
Anger Tales presents four stories about individuals grappling with intense anger in various life scenarios.

In the first story, "Benefit Show", Ranga (played by Venkatesh Maha) passionately organises a special movie screening of his favourite actor. However, chaos ensues when a local leader named Sreenu takes advantage of the situation, causing complications with ticket sales and jeopardising Ranga's reputation.

In "Food Festival", Pooja Reddy navigates the challenges of adhering to her in-laws' vegan lifestyle amidst dietary conflicts within her community. The situation intensifies when her doctor prescribes a diet conflicting with her newfound choices, highlighting the struggles one faces in reconciling personal preferences with societal expectations.

"Afternoon Nap" follows Radha as she deals with the monotony of life, migraines, and an irritating landlady. Her unchecked anger leads to an unexpected act of revenge, unraveling the consequences of uncontrolled emotions.

Lastly, "Helmet Head" focuses on Giridhar, who faces a series of setbacks, including unemployment and baldness. His quest for a solution disrupts his inner peace, triggering a rebellion and revealing the unexpected consequences of seeking resolution.

Anger Tales weaves these stories to offer viewers a mosaic of human emotions, shedding light on the intricate fallout of unrestrained anger. The series invites audiences to reflect on the labyrinth of emotions and the unpredictable paths they carve through our lives.

== Cast ==
- Venkatesh Maha as Ranga
- Madonna Sebastian as Pooja Reddy
- Bindu Madhavi as Radha
- Ravindra Vijay as Radha's Husband
- Phani Acharya as Giridhar
- Tharun Bhascker as Rajeev
- Suhas as Sreenu

== Episodes ==
=== Series overview ===
Series	Episodes	Originally released
1	4	9 March 2023

=== Season 1 (2023) ===
No. overall	No. in season	Title	Directed by	Written by	Original release date
1	1	"Benefit Show"	Prabhala Tilak	Karthikeya Karedla; Prabhala Tilak	9 March 2023
2	2	"Food Festival"	Prabhala Tilak	Karthikeya Karedla; Prabhala Tilak	9 March 2023
3	3	"An Afternoon Nap"	Prabhala Tilak	Karthikeya Karedla; Prabhala Tilak	9 March 2023
4	4	"Helmet Head"	Prabhala Tilak	Karthikeya Karedla; Prabhala Tilak	9 March 2023

== Reception ==
A critic from 123telugu gave the series 2.25/5 stars in their review and wrote that "Anger Tales is a compilation series that operates in segments.", and a critic from eenadu.net wrote that the "Anger Tales series could have been better if it reduced the stretch and reduced the length of all the episodes".

Sangeetha Devi Dundo of The Hindu remarked, "Anger Tales adeptly situates each narrative and character within authentic settings, enhanced by actors proficient in effectively conveying emotional upheavals".

Naziria on Gulte.com stated that "Anger Tales is described as a weird yet watchable concept-driven drama. The reviewer highlights that all the stories within the film are skillfully set up, featuring conflict points that viewers can immediately relate to. Additionally, the characters portrayed elicit sympathy from the audience, adding depth to the overall narrative".

G. Gowtham from India Herald stated that "Anger Tales, describing it as an anthology program that, on the whole, has its standout moments. Notably, the performances of the key actors, especially in the first episode featuring Venkatesh Maha and Suhas, significantly contribute to the show's appeal".

Kiran from Telangana Today mentioned that "Anger Tales could be a worthwhile viewing experience for audiences, given its relatable incidents and commendable performances. What stands out is the film's ability to meet expectations, especially when approached with modest anticipations".

Srivathsan Nadadhur, a reviewer from OTTPlay, awarded the series a rating of 3 out of 5 stars. He described "Anger Tales as a fresh perspective on the consequences of anger, emphasizing its intriguing portrayal of how four ordinary individuals navigate conflicting situations by channeling their anger. The anthology makes a genuine effort to delve into the emotional aspects of anger and its far-reaching repercussions across the four segments".

Abhilasha Cherukuri from Cinema Express gave the series 4/5 stars and stated that "Anger Tales shifts its focus inward, portraying anger as a crucial force for self-preservation within its protagonists, rather than a display of larger-than-life bravado. The film seamlessly blends craftsmanship and emotion, constructing narratives that serve as a poignant dissection of emotionally repressed individuals."

== See also ==
- List of Disney+ Hotstar original programming
