= Ustaad (2023 film) =

- Release poster
- Directed by: Phanideep
- Written by: Phanideep
- Produced by: Rajani Korrapati; Rakesh Reddy Gaddam; Himank Reddy Duvvuru
- Starring: Sri Simha Koduri; Kavya Kalyanram; Gautham Vasudev Menon
- Cinematography: Pavan Kumar Pappula
- Edited by: Carthic Cuts
- Music by: Akeeva B
- Production company: Vaaraahi Chalana Chitram
- Release date: 12 August 2023
- Country: India
- Language: Telugu

Ustaad is a 2023 Indian Telugu-language coming-of-age drama film directed by Phanideep and starring Sri Simha Koduri, Kavya Kalyanram, and Gautham Vasudev Menon. The music was composed by Akeeva B with cinematography by Pavan Kumar Pappula. The film was released on 12 August 2023 and received mixed-to-negative reviews from critics.

== Cast ==
- Sri Simha Koduri as Surya Sivakumar
- Kavya Kalyanram as Meghana
- Gautham Vasudev Menon as Joseph D'Souza
- Anu Hasan as Gayathri
- Ravindra Vijay as Alcoholic Mechanic
- Venkatesh Maha as Sivakumar, Surya's father (cameo appearance)
- Ravi Siva Teja as Surya's friend

The lead characters' names are based on the actors and characters from Surya S/o Krishnan (2008), whose director, Gautham Vasudev Menon, acts in this film.

== Soundtrack ==
The music was composed by Akeeva B.

Track listing
No.	Title	Lyrics	Singer(s)	Length
1.	"Roju"	Anantha Sriram	Anurag Kulkarni	4:00
2.	"Aakasam Adhire"	Lakshmi Priyanka	Kaala Bhairava, Aditya Sreeram	2:42
3.	"Chukkalonchi"	Rahman	Karthik	3:13
4.	"Nanu Veedi"	Rahman	Kaala Bhairava	3:04
Total length:				12:59

== Reception ==
A critic from The Hindu wrote that "The drama loses steam after a point and the writing resorts to cinematic overtures and convenient coincidences in the final segment. Had this portion been conceived better, it would have been a befitting end to the coming-of-age story". A critic from OTTplay wrote that "Ustaad is a coming-of-age story depicting the transition of a directionless teenager to a pilot where a bike is a metaphor to portray his journey. The film struggles to keep you invested in the protagonist’s journey despite the impressive performances, visual detailing and technical finesse".
