= Kavya Kalyanram =

Indian film actress

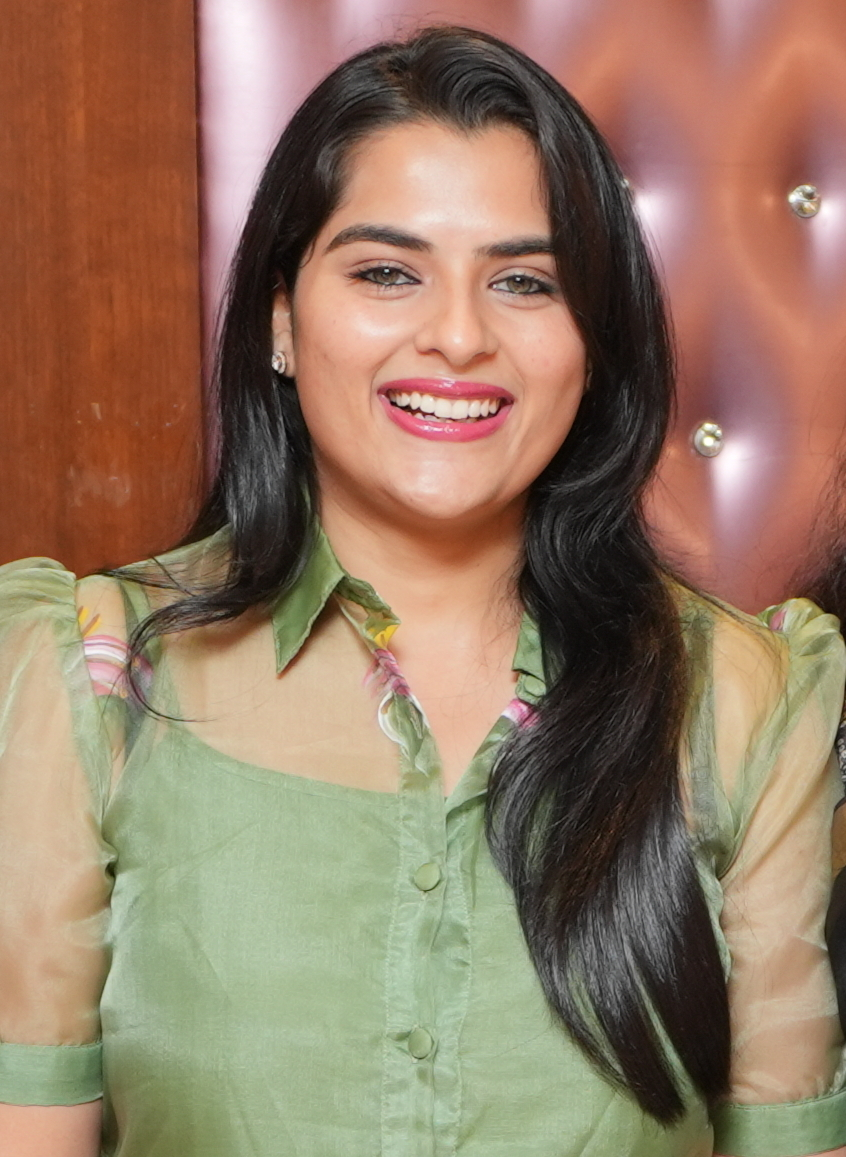
- Kavya in 2024
- Born: 20 July 1998 (age 28); Kothagudem, Andhra Pradesh, India (now in Telangana, India)
- Education: Symbiosis International University, Pune
- Occupation: Actor

Kavya Kalyanram is an Indian actress who appears in Telugu films. Her acting career began as a child actor in Hyderabad, Telangana, India with the movie Snehamante Idera. She subsequently appeared in several other films, including Gangotri, Tagore, Vijayendra Varma, Balu, Bunny, Pandurangadu and Ullasamga Utsahamga. She made her lead debut with Masooda in 2022. She is known for her role Balagam (2023). She starred in Ustaad (2023).

== Early life and career ==
Kavya Kalyanram was born in Kothagudem on 20 July 1998 and raised in Hyderabad. After playing roles as a child artiste, she was noticed for her role in Balagam (2023).

== Filmography ==
Year	Title	Role	Notes
2001	Snehamante Idera	Young Amrutha	Child artist
2003	Gangotri	Young Gangotri	Child artist
2003	Tagore	Tagore's adopted daughter	Child artist
2004	Adavi Ramudu	Young Madhu	Child artist
2004	Letha Manasulu	Raju's daughter	Child artist
2004	Vijayendra Varma	Ammulu	Child artist
2005	Balu	Lilly	Child artist
2005	Bunny	Young Mahalakshmi	Child artist
2005	Subhash Chandra Bose	A kid in freedom struggle	Child artist
2008	Pandurangadu	Pundarika's Niece	Child artist
2008	Ullasamga Utsahamga	Young Dhanalakshmi	Child artist
2022	Masooda	Mini	Debut as Lead Actress
2023	Balagam	Sandhya	
2023	Ustaad	Meghana	
2026	What's Up Naresh †	Sarika	Announced
