= Vijayendra Varma =

- Theatrical release poster
- Directed by: Swarna Subba Rao
- Screenplay by: V. Vijayendra Prasad; M. Rathnam; Sai Vidyardhi
- Dialogues by: M. Rathnam
- Story by: V. Vijayendra Prasad
- Produced by: Konda Krishnam Raju
- Starring: Nandamuri Balakrishna; Laya; Sangeetha; Ankitha
- Cinematography: V. S. R. Swamy; P. V. V. Jagan Mohana Rao
- Edited by: Kotagiri Venkateswara Rao
- Music by: Koti
- Production company: Aditya Productions
- Release date: 15 December 2004
- Running time: 168 minutes
- Country: India
- Language: Telugu

Vijayendra Varma is a 2004 Indian Telugu-language action film produced by Konda Krishnam Raju under Aditya Productions banner and directed by Swarna Subba Rao. It features Nandamuri Balakrishna, Laya, Sangeeta, and Ankitha, with the music composed by Koti. The film was panned both by critics and audience. The core plot of the film was reportedly inspired by the 2002 film The Bourne Identity.

== Plot ==
In the penultimate scene of the film, Varma throws the antagonist, Pakistani Terrorist Leader Aslam Khan (played by Mukesh Rishi) from a plane, exclaiming "Hey Aslam Khan, this is not my hand, but a noose around your neck!". As he falls, Varma shoots him multiple times, and then throws an Indian flag at Khan's corpse that plants in the ground where his body lands. Varma salutes the flag.

== Cast ==
- Nandamuri Balakrishna as Colonel Vijayendra Varma"Arjun"
- Laya as Indira; Mrs Vijayendera Varma; Vijayendera's wife
- Ankitha as Venkata Lakshmi
- Sangeetha as Journalist
- Mukesh Rishi as Aslam Khan (Pakistan Terrorists leader)
- Ashish Vidyarthi as Naanaji
- Brahmanandam
- Ahuti Prasad
- Chalapathi Rao as Yadav
- M. Balayya as Dr.Narayana Rao
- Bhupendra Singh as Rahul
- M. S. Narayana
- Manorama as Fathima
- Ralyalakshmi as Raziya
- Venu Madhav
- Giri Babu as Satyam
- Raghu Babu as Bademieya
- Sudhakar
- Narra Venkateswara Rao as Narayana
- Lakshmipati
- Satya Prakash as Army Officer
- Surya as Nazir
- Mohan Raj as Minister
- Shobaraj
- Delhi Rajeswari
- Karate Kalyani as Juice Maker
- Banda Jyothy as Colony Member
- Shoba Rani
- Ooma Chowdary as Indira's mother
- Master Tanush as Nazir's son
- Baby Kavya Kalyanram as Ammulu, Vijayendra Varma's daughter

== Soundtrack ==
Vijayendra Varma

Film score by Koti
- Released: 2004
- Genre: Soundtrack
- Length: 28:12
- Label: Supreme Music
- Producer: Koti

Koti chronology
| Naalo Unna Prema (2004) | Vijayendra Varma (2004) | Gowri (2004) |

Music composed by Koti.

| No. | Title | Lyrics | Singer(s) | Length |
|---|---|---|---|---|
| 1. | "Siggu Paparo" | Suddala Ashok Teja | Tippu, K. S. Chithra | 4:43 |
| 2. | "Oh Manmadha" | Sirivennela Sitarama Sastry | Udit Narayan, Shreya Ghoshal | 5:06 |
| 3. | "Maisamma Maisamma" | Veturi | K. S. Chithra, Udit Narayan | 4:46 |
| 4. | "Guntadu Guntadu" | Suddala Ashok Teja | Tippu, Kousalya | 4:20 |
| 5. | "Mandapetalo" | Chandrabose | Shankar Mahadevan, K. S. Chithra | 4:38 |
| 6. | "Ningi Kadupunu" | Suddala Ashok Teja | S. P. Balasubrahmanyam | 4:23 |
| Total length: | | | | 28:12 |
