= Appu Prabhakar =

Indian cinematographer

- അപ്പു പ്രഭാകർ
- Education: Satyajit Ray Film and Television Institute, National Institute of Technology Calicut
- Occupation: Cinematographer
- Years active: 2018–present

Appu Prabhakar is a national award-winning Indian cinematographer who is known for his works in Malayalam, Bengali, Telugu and Nepali films.

== Career ==
Appu Prabhakar completed a Bachelor of Technology degree from National Institute of Technology Calicut, and studied cinematography at Satyajit Ray Film and Television Institute. He worked as a second camera operator for the Malayalam film Comrade in America (2017). In 2018, he worked as a cinematographer for the short film, Eye Test, for which he received the National Film Award for Best Non-Feature Film Cinematography. He worked on several films in Malayalam, Bengali, and Nepali before making his Telugu film debut with Uma Maheswara Ugra Roopasya (2020).

== Filmography ==
Year	Film	Language	Notes
2018	Certain Lives in Twilight	Malayalam	
2019	Bhalobashar Shohor	Bengali	Segments Kolkatar Kobitara and Pori
2019	Nimtoh	Nepali	
2019	Robibaar	Bengali	
2020	Uma Maheswara Ugra Roopasya	Telugu	
2021	Thimmarusu	Telugu	
2021	Binisutoy	Bengali	
2022	Abhijaan	Bengali	
2023	Aaro Ek Prithibi	Bengali	
2023	Palan	Bengali	
2024	Level Cross	Malayalam	
2025	Rekhachithram	Malayalam	
2025	Narayaneente Moonnaanmakkal	Malayalam	
2026	Bachelor Party D'eux	Malayalam	

== Awards and nominations ==
Year	Award	Category	Work	Result	Notes	Ref.
2018	65th National Film Awards	Best Non-Feature Film Cinematography	Eye Test	Won	Won the award along with Arnold Fernandes for Dawn	
