= Family Drama (2021 film) =

- Promotional release poster
- Directed by: Meher Tej
- Screenplay by: Meher Tej; Shanmukha Prashant
- Story by: Meher Tej
- Starring: Suhas; Teja Kasarapu
- Cinematography: Venkat R. Shakamuri
- Edited by: Ramakrishna Arram
- Music by: Ajay and Sanjay
- Production companies: Chashma Films; Noothana Bharathi Films; Mango Mass Media
- Distributed by: SonyLIV
- Release date: 29 October 2021
- Running time: 132 min
- Country: India
- Language: Telugu

Family Drama is a 2021 Indian Telugu-language neo-noir film written and directed by Meher Tej. The film is produced by Chashma Films, Noothana Bharathi Films, and Mango Mass Media. It stars Suhas and Teja Kasarapu and premiered on 29 October 2021 on the streaming service SonyLIV.

== Plot ==
Sadashiva Rao (Sanjay Ratha) is a temperamental and abusive man who lives with his wife Parvathi (Sruti Meher Nori), son Lakshman (Teja Kasarapu), and daughter-in-law Yamini (Pooja Kiran). Sadashiva often berates his family, threatening to evict Lakshman and Yamini if Lakshman doesn’t find a job soon. While Yamini remains unaware of the family's dysfunction, Lakshman is frustrated by his father’s behavior.

Rama (Suhas), Sadashiva’s elder son from his first marriage and Lakshman’s half-brother, had been estranged from the family after being thrown out by Sadashiva years ago. When Lakshman reconnects with Rama, they conspire to paralyze their father with poison in his coffee, seeking revenge and inheritance. Lakshman convinces Parvathi to assist, and that night, Sadashiva is paralyzed.

The next day, Rama returns home with his wife Mahati (Anusha Nuthula) to ensure the transfer of wealth and prevent Parvathi from disrupting their plans out of guilt. Meanwhile, Rama’s friend Nagesh unexpectedly arrives, seeking repayment for a loan. Rama lures him to the backyard under the guise of getting high and kills him by slitting his throat with a blade. Yamini witnesses this murder and tells Lakshman, who convinces her to stay quiet until the inheritance is secure, fearing an investigation into Sadashiva’s condition.

Soon, Sadashiva’s family friend Vasuki (Geddam Srinivas) visits and overhears Rama admitting to the paralysis plot. Rama and Lakshman catch him and kill him, this time with Lakshman delivering the fatal blow. Mahati witnesses the murder but only sees Lakshman, not Rama, hiding nearby.

It’s revealed that both brothers are serial killers. Rama had killed three people initially, and Lakshman, unknown to Rama, copied his method to kill three more victims, making the public believe there was only one killer. When Mahati confronts Rama about Lakshman’s involvement, he convinces her not to go to the police, using the same argument Lakshman used on Yamini.

Mahati discreetly contacts Vasuki’s son, Subhash, to follow up on his missing father. Meanwhile, Yamini and Mahati confide in each other, and Yamini realizes Lakshman is also a killer. She sedates both brothers and digs up Nagesh’s corpse with Mahati, but instead, they find Vasuki’s body, leaving Mahati unconvinced of Rama’s guilt. Rama overhears this and plots to kill both women, but Lakshman insists on sparing Yamini until the wealth transfer is complete.

Mahati finally realizes Rama’s murderous nature when he reacts violently to her stepping outside. At that moment, Subhash arrives to inquire about his father, but before Yamini can warn him, Rama and Lakshman kill him as their wives watch in horror. With no choice left, Mahati and Yamini assist in covering up the murders.

The three women soon barricade themselves inside the house as the brothers plan to kill them. Lakshman strikes a deal with Yamini, asking her to send Parvathi outside when the inheritance papers are signed, promising no harm if they cooperate. However, Parvathi turns out to be colluding with Rama and Lakshman, planning to kill their wives.

In the end, Yamini and Mahati manage to kill both brothers in self-defense during an ambush. Parvathi, in a twist, calls the police and frames the two women as the infamous serial killers, also responsible for murdering her sons, Nagesh, Vasuki and Subhash. As Yamini and Mahati are arrested and taken away, Parvathi watches them from the porch, having successfully deceived the authorities.

== Cast ==
- Suhas as Rama
- Teja Kasarapu as Lakshman
- Pooja Kiran as Yamini, Lakshman's wife
- Sruti Meher Nori as Parvathi, Lakshman's mother
- Sanjay Ratha as Sadashiva Rao, Rama & Lakshman's father
- Anusha Nuthula as Mahati, Rama's wife
