= Sharanya Pradeep =

Indian actress

- Born: 17 May 1994 (age 32); Nizamabad, Andhra Pradesh (present–day Telangana), India
- Years active: 2017–present
- Spouse: Pradeep Manku (m. 2015)

Sharanya Pradeep (born 17 May 1992) is an Indian actress who works in Telugu films. In the past she worked as a news anchor for the Indian news channel V6. In 2025, she received the Gaddar Telangana Film Award as Best Supporting Actress in Ambajipeta Marriage Band.

== Career ==
Sharanya Pradeep made her acting debut with Fidaa (2017), in which she portrayed the elder sister of Sai Pallavi's character.

After appearing in minor roles in several films, she gained wider recognition for her performance in Ambajipeta Marriage Band (2024), where she played the twin sister of Suhas' character.

She also appeared in the Bhamakalapam series (2022–2024), where she played a supporting role alongside Priyamani.

== Filmography ==
Year	Title	Role	Notes
2017	Fidaa	Renuka	Nominated—Filmfare Award for Best Supporting Actress
2018	Shailaja Reddy Alludu	Kumari	
2019	Crazy Crazy Feeling	Swapna	
2019	Dorasaani	Maid	
2019	Marshal	Suma	
2019	Mismatch	Mahalakshmi's friend	
2020	Jaanu	Subhashini	Nominated—Filmfare Award for Best Supporting Actress
2020	World Famous Lover	Suvarna	Dubbing artist for Aishwarya Rajesh
2021	30 Rojullo Preminchadam Ela	Akshara's sister	
2021	Amma Deevena	Padma	
2021	Pushpaka Vimanam	Meenakshi's Friend	
2021	Sashi	Padma	
2021	Thellavarithe Guruvaram	Vijaya	
2022	Bhamakalapam	Shilpa	
2022	Mishan Impossible	Raghupati's mother	
2022	The Warriorr	Nitya	Shot simultaneously in Tamil
2022	Krishna Vrinda Vihari	Saindhavi	
2023	Kushi	Deepu	
2023	Martin Luther King	Vasantha	
2024	Ambajipeta Marriage Band	Padma	
2024	Bhamakalapam 2	Shilpa	
2024	Swag	Dakshayani / Kausalya	
2024	KA	Gurunadham’s adopted daughter	
2026	Lenin		
2026	Karmakhya	Pravallika	
2026	Garividi Lakshmi	Lakshmi Friend	

=== Television ===
Year	Title	Role	Network
2014-2015	Teenmaar News	Lachamma	V6 News
2015-2021	Dhoom Dhaam Muchatlu		T News
2022	Recce	Vasantha	ZEE5
2022	Gaalivaana	Jyothi	ZEE5

== Awards ==
- Gaddar Telangana Film Awards 2025: Best Supporting Actress for Ambajipeta Marriage Band.
