= Madonna Sebastian =

Indian actress

- Madonna in 2019
- Born: 19 May 1992 (age 34); Kolenchery, Kerala, India
- Education: Christ University, Bangalore
- Occupations: Actress; playback singer
- Years active: 2015–present

Madonna Sebastian (19 May 1992) is an Indian actress and singer who primarily works in Tamil and Malayalam films. She made her acting debut with the 2015 Malayalam film Premam.

== Early life ==
Madonna was born to Sebastian and Shyla at Kolenchery, Kerala, India, and she belongs to a Malayali Syrian Christian family raised in Angamaly. She did her higher studies at St Peter's Senior Secondary School, Kadayiruppu. She did a one-year Master Training course at START Kozhikode. She graduated with a Bachelor of Commerce from Christ University, Bangalore.

== Career ==
=== Early work in multiple languages films (2015–2018) ===
Madonna Sebastian has sung tracks for composers like Deepak Dev and Gopi Sunder. Her participation in Malayalam musical program Music Mojo, After seeing her host a program for Surya TV, director Alphonse Putharen called her to audition for his romantic film Premam (2015). Even though she was not interested in acting, she auditioned and was considered for the role of Mary. However, on her insistence that she related more with Celine, Mary's role was given to Anupama Parameswaran.

After Premam, she then made her Tamil debut opposite Vijay Sethupathi in Kadhalum Kadandhu Pogum (2016), the film makes mixed to positive reviews from critics, and became an average hit at box office. Her second Malayalam movie was King Liar (2016), in which she starred opposite Dileep. The film received mixed reviews and became a moderate success. Then Madonna reprised her role for the Telugu remake of Premam (2016), with Naga Chaitanya and Shruti Hassan replacing Nivin Pauly and Sai Pallavi, respectively, and marking her debut in Telugu cinema. The film received mixed reviews, though becomes an average success.

In 2017, Madonna Sebastian has also paired up with Sethupathi again after her Tamil debut with him in the Tamil film Kavan directed by K. V. Anand. the film makes mixed to highly positive reviews from critics. Then she appeared in Dhanush's directorial debut Power Paandi where she played the role of "Young Poonthendral". Both the films were commercially successful at Box office.

In 2018, Madonna Sebastian's first release is a Tamil movie Junga, she landed in an extended cameo appearance in the film, opposite Vijay Sethupathi, marking collaboration with him for the third time, directed by Gokul. Her second release is a Malayalam film Iblis, opposite Asif Ali directed by Rohit VS. the film was a commercial success.

=== Career expansion and further progression (2019–present) ===
In 2019, her first release was a multi-starrer medical thriller film titled Virus, in which she played the role of Dr. Sara Yakub, directed by Aashiq Abu. The film becomes a major commercial success, and became one of the top 25 Malayalam films of decade. And her second release was Brother's Day, opposite Prithviraj Sukumaran, directed by Kalabhavan Shajohn. The film becomes a blockbuster at the box-office.

Her only release in 2020 was Vaanam Kottattum, opposite Vikram Prabhu, directed by Dhana Sekaran. the film receives mixed to positive reviews, but became a commercial failure.

In 2021, Madonna Sebastian made her Kannada debut with Kottigobba 3, opposite Sudeep, directed by Shiva Karthik. The film was released by theatrically on October 15, 2021, the film makes a mixed reviews and performed well in Box-office collection. Her second release was Shyam Singha Roy starring Nani and Sai Pallavi, directed by Rahul Sankrityan. The film was received mixed to positive reviews from both critics and audience. and becomes a box-office hit.

In 2022, her first release Kombu Vatcha Singamda, opposite Sasikumar, directed by S.R. Prabhakaran. the film received mixed to negative reviews from critics and audience, and was a flop at the box-office. Later she made her digital streaming debut with a Tamil webseries Kaiyum Kalavum, which was released on Sony LIV and received generally positive reviews from critics.

In 2023, her first release was a webseries in Telugu launguage, Anger Tales, which was premiered on Disney + Hotstar and received mixed reviews. Her second release was Padmini, opposite Kunchacko Boban. The film received mostly positive reviews from critics and audience, and was a box-office success. Later that year, she took part of a Tamil film Leo, starring Vijay where she played Vijay's twin sister character Elisa Das. The film received mixed to positive reviews from critics and became a box-office hit.

== Media image and other work ==
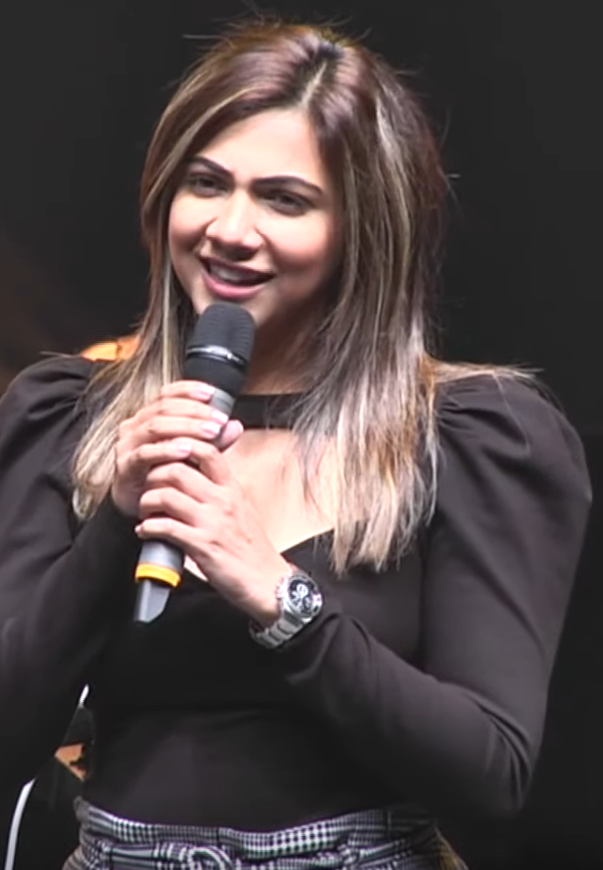
Madonna at an event

In the Kochi Times Most Desirable Women list, Madonna was placed 11th in 2018, 2nd in 2019, and 11th again in 2020.

Madonna, a trained singer in Carnatic and Western music, she has performed for Music Mojo of Kappa TV and numerous popular Malayalam music directors and singers. In 2015, she sang a song titled "Raavukalil" for the You Too Brutus with musical backing from Roby Abraham. They subsequently formed a band named Everafter. In January 2016, the band released online its first music video titled "Veruthe". In 2016, she also sang a song for the film Valleem Thetti Pulleem Thetti titled "Pularkalam Pole". Madonna Sebastian has also sung the jingle composed by Deepak Dev for Hit 96.7, a radio station based in Dubai.

== Filmography ==
Key
†	Denotes films that have not yet been released

=== Films ===
List of films and roles
Year	Title	Role(s)	Language(s)	Notes	Ref.
2015	Premam	Celine George	Malayalam	Malayalam debut	
2016	King Liar	Anjali	Malayalam		
2016	Premam	Sindhu Vatsalya	Telugu	Telugu debut	
2016	Kadhalum Kadandhu Pogum	Yazhini Bhakthirajan	Tamil	Tamil debut	
2017	Kavan	Malar	Tamil		
2017	Pa. Pandi	Young Poonthendral	Tamil		
2018	Junga	Thoppuli	Tamil	Cameo appearance	
2018	Iblis	Fida	Malayalam		
2019	Virus	Dr. Sara Yakub Ali	Malayalam		
2019	Brother's Day	Jema George	Malayalam		
2020	Vaanam Kottatum	Preetha George	Tamil		
2021	Kotigobba 3	Priya	Kannada	Kannada debut	
2021	Shyam Singha Roy	Lawyer Padmavathi	Telugu		
2022	Kombu Vatcha Singamda	Thamizhselvi	Tamil		
2023	Padmini	Padmini	Malayalam		
2023	Leo	Elisa Das	Tamil		
2024	Jolly O Gymkhana	Bhavani	Tamil		
2025	Drive	Shreya	Telugu		
2026	Sathi Leelavathi	Nichola Sebastian	Telugu		
2026	Heartin	Sahithya	Tamil		
TBA	Adhirshtasaali †	TBA	Tamil	Completed	

=== Television ===
List of films and roles
Year	Title	Role(s)	Language	Network	Ref.
2022	Kaiyum Kalavum	Meenakshi	Tamil	SonyLIV	
2023	Anger Tales	Pooja Reddy	Telugu	Disney+ Hotstar	

== Discography ==
Year	Film	Song	Music director	Language	Ref.
2016	Valleem Thetti Pulleem Thetti	Pularkalam Pole	Sooraj S. Kurup	Malayalam	
2017	Kavan	Happy New Year	Hiphop Tamizha	Tamil	
2019	Virus	Spread Love	Sushin Shyam	Malayalam	

== Awards and nominations ==
Year	Award	Category	Film(s)	Result
2016	5th South Indian International Movie Awards	Best Female Debut – Malayalam	Premam	Nominated
2016	1st IIFA Utsavam	Best Performance In A Supporting Role - Female	Premam	Nominated
2017	6th South Indian International Movie Awards	Best Female Debut – Tamil	Kadhalum Kadandhu Pogum	Nominated
2017	Behindwoods Golden Medals	Best Actor – Female	Kadhalum Kadandhu Pogum	Nominated
2017	Ananda Vikatan Cinema Awards	Best Debut Actress	Kadhalum Kadandhu Pogum	Won
2021	She Awards India	Beauty of The Year	—N/a	Won
2022	Filmfare Awards South	Best Supporting Actress – Telugu	Shyam Singha Roy	Nominated
2025	17th Edison Awards South	Best Mesmerizing Performer	—N/a	Won
