= Battala Ramaswamy Biopikku =

- Official release poster
- Directed by: Ram Narayan
- Written by: Vasudeva Murthy
- Produced by: Satish Kumar; Rama Krishna Veerapaneni
- Starring: Altaf Hasan; Lavanya Reddy
- Cinematography: PS Manikarnan
- Edited by: Sagar Dadi
- Music by: Ram Narayan
- Production companies: Seven Hills; Mango Mass Media
- Distributed by: ZEE5
- Release date: 14 May 2021
- Running time: 136 minutes
- Country: India
- Language: Telugu

Battala Ramaswamy Biopikku is a 2021 Indian Telugu-language comedy drama film written by Vasudeva Murthy and directed by Ram Narayan. Produced by Satish Kumar and Rama Krishna Veerapaneni under the production house as Seven Hills and Mango Mass Media production. The film stars Altaf Hasan, Lavanya Reddy, Bhadram and Satvika Jay. The film released through direct-to-video on ZEE5 on 14 May 2021.

== Plot ==
Ramaswamy is a kind and a true gentleman with two ambitions: one is to have only a single wife just like Lord Rama and the second is to set up a saree business. Ramaswamy marries the love of his life Jayaprada who sells pearl jewellery. She helps Ramaswamy start his saree business by pawning her gold necklace. Due to unavoidable situations, Ramaswamy marries two other women Jayasudha & Sridevi. Ramaswamy then faces many problems due to differences among his three wives and the debts left behind by his father.

== Cast ==
- Altaf Hasan as Battala Ramaswami
- Shanthi Rao as Jayaprada
- Lavanya Reddy as Jayasudha
- Satvika Jay as Sridevi
- Bhadram as Kasta Anarkali Baba; friend
- Siri Chandana

== Production ==
Principal photography of the film ended in December 2020. The filmmaker released its teaser in February 2021 along with lyrical and video songs. The film was announced on 4 May 2021 by releasing a teaser.

== Release ==
Due to the COVID-19 situation and later its full-length movie leak, the filmmaker has decided to release the film digitally. It was released on ZEE5 on 14 May 2021.

== Reception ==
Murali Krishna CH of Cinema Express gave 1.5 of 5 stars stating that this supposed 'biopic' leaves you yawning. The Times of India critic Sravan Vanaparthy rated the film 2/5, writing "Battala Ramaswamy Biopokku has a story that’s outdated and the execution tests one’s patience. It also faces issues with continuity, direction and screenplay." Rentala Jayadeva in his review for Sakshi appreciated the lead actor's performance while criticizing the screenplay and pacing in the second-half.
