= Mr & Miss =

2021 film by T. Ashok Kumar Reddy

- Release poster
- Directed by: T. Ashok Kumar Reddy
- Screenplay by: Sudheer Varma
- Story by: T. Ashok Kumar Reddy
- Starring: Sailesh Sunny; Gnaneswari Kandregula
- Cinematography: Siddam Manohar
- Edited by: Carthic Cuts
- Music by: Yashwanth Nag
- Production company: Reading Lamp Creations
- Release date: 29 January 2021
- Country: India
- Language: Telugu

Mr & Miss is a 2021 Indian Telugu-language romantic drama film written and directed by T. Ashok Kumar Reddy and it is a crowdfunded film under the banner of Reading Lamp Creations. The film features Sailesh Sunny and Gnaneswari Kandregula in the lead roles.

== Plot ==
Shashi works as a HR in a company and has been looking for a transfer to Hyderabad and finally, she gets transferred. She reaches Hyderabad happily, thinking that she can live with her boyfriend happily. After reaching Hyderabad, she sees her boyfriend in a compromising situation with another girl and gets hurt. Her boyfriend talks in such a way that her ego gets hurt. She goes to a pub from there and kisses Shiva who was sitting alone and leaves from there. Shiva gets into a state of shock. Shiva is a BTech graduate from Amalapuram. Upon his father ‘s pressure he tries to get a job by paying money through backdoor. But, he gets cheated there. Shashi comes as a HR for the same company. Shashi gets impressed by the innocence of Shiva and says that she can give the job if he learns English in 15 days. From then, friendship blossoms between them while Shiva learns English with the help of Shashi.

Soon, their friendship turns to love. And they get into live in relationship and lives …

== Cast ==
- Sailesh Sunny as Siva
- Gnaneswari Kandregula as Sashi

== Release and reception ==
The film was released on 29 January 2021.

The Times of India critic Thadhagath Pathi rated the film 1.5 of 5 stars, calling it a "predictable, lacklustre saga." In his review for Sakshi, Rentala Jayadeva opined that the film suffers from poorly written second-half and irrational song placement. Surya Prakash Joshyula of Asianet News Telugu rated the film 2/5, and wrote "Though the concept of the film is good, it falters badly at execution and treatment [sic]."
