= Ambajipeta Marriage Band =

2024 Indian Telugu comedy drama film

- Theatrical release poster
- Directed by: Dushyanth Katikaneni
- Written by: Dushyanth Katikaneni
- Produced by: Dheeraj Mogilineni; Venkat Reddy
- Starring: Suhas; Shivani Nagaram; Goparaju Ramana; Sharanya Pradeep
- Cinematography: Wajid Baig
- Edited by: Kodati Pavan Kalyan
- Music by: Shekar Chandra
- Production companies: GA2 Pictures; Dheeraj Mogilineni Entertainment; Mahayana Motion Pictures
- Release date: 2 February 2024
- Running time: 132 mins
- Country: India
- Language: Telugu
- Box office: ₹10 crore

Ambajipeta Marriage Band is a 2024 Indian Telugu-language social drama film written and directed by debutant Dushyanth Katikaneni. The film features Suhas, Shivani Nagaram, Sharanya Pradeep, and Goparaju Ramana in the lead roles.

The film was theatrically released in India on 2 February 2024, receiving positive reviews from critics.

== Plot ==
Ambajipeta Marriage Band unfolds in the quaint village of Ambajipeta in the East Godavari district, Andhra Pradesh. The central characters are Malli and Padma, twins raised by Kanaka, a salon owner. Malli becomes a skilled barber in a marriage band, while Padma, a teacher, faces rumours of an alleged relationship with Venkata Babu.

Tensions rise as Venkata, a businessman, becomes entangled in a complex web of love and societal expectations. The narrative explores love beyond caste boundaries, delving into the challenges faced by the characters. The story takes unexpected turns, revealing the consequences of societal judgements and the resilience of true love.

== Cast ==
- Suhas as Mallikarjuna "Malli"
- Shivani Nagaram as Chalasani Lakshmi, Malli's love-interest
- Sharanya Pradeep as Padma, Malli’s twin sister
- Nithin Prasanna as Chalasani Venkata Babu, Lakshmi and Seenu Babu’s brother
- Jagadeesh Prathap Bandari as Sanjeev, Malli’s bestfriend and Padma’s love interest
- Swarnakanth as Chalasani Seenu Babu, Lakshmi’s second brother
- Goparaju Ramana as Narasimha, Ambajipeta Marriage Band Head
- Gayathri Bhargavi as Chalasani Jhansi, Venkata Babu’s Wife and Lakshmi’s sister-in-law
- Surabhi Prabhavathi as Malli and Padma’s mother
- Kittayya as Kanakayya, Malli and Padma’s father
- Dushyanth Katikaneni
- Sandeep Raj as Village guy
- Bhavana
- Divya Chalamalasetty as Lakshmi's friend
- Swathi
- Khushi Mannem as Gowri, Lakshmi’s friend
- Vinay Mahadev as Prasad, Malli’s friend
- Bhanu as Chinnu, Venkata Babu and Jhansi’s son
- Jabardasth Bobby
- Pullayya Pantulu Mylavarapu as factory worker(Seenubabu Assistant)

== Production ==
The film was announced through a pooja ceremony in Hyderabad in October 2021.

== Soundtrack ==
The soundtrack and background score were composed by Shekar Chandra. The audio rights were acquired by Sony Music India.

No.	Title	Lyrics	Singer(s)	Length
1.	"Gumma Gumma"	Rahaman	Shekar Chandra	3:50
2.	"Maa Ooru Ambajipeta"	Rahaman	Kaala Bhairava	3:16
3.	"Cheekati Vekuvaga"	Kalyan Chakravarthy Tripuraneni	Mohana Bhogaraju	3:59
4.	"Gunde Gaani Mandindiante"	Suresh Banisetti	Gotte Kanakavva	2:39
5.	"Vundipomanne Chotu Kaadu Idi"	Kalyan Chakravarthy Tripuraneni	Dinesh Rudra
6.	"Kadupulo Serisagamayna Pranamu"	Kalyan Chakravarthy Tripuraneni	Kaala Bhairava
Total length:				13.04

== Release ==
=== Theatrical ===
Ambajipeta Marriage Band had a worldwide theatrical release on 2 February 2024.

=== Home media ===
The digital distribution rights of the film were acquired by Aha, and was premiered on 1 March 2024.

== Reception ==
Sangeetha Devi Dundo of The Hindu stated that In Dushyanth Katikaneni's inaugural venture, "Ambajipeta Marriage Band, a compelling story unfolds, delving deep into the profound struggle for dignity. Suhas and Sharanya Pradeep take center stage, contributing remarkable performances that serve as the beating heart of this narrative. "Ambajipeta Marriage Band" emerges not only as a cinematic achievement but as a commentary on the unwavering pursuit of dignity, made all the more impactful through the stellar performances at its core." The Times of India gave the film 3.5/5 stars and stated that "Ambajipeta Marriage Band adeptly blends authenticity and engaging storytelling with nuanced performances and a rich narrative that delves into societal issues."

Samayam Telugu gave the film 3/5 stars and wrote that "Suhas stole the show with his stellar performance, delivering laughs and tears. Nitin Prasanna nailed the villain's role, and Shivani and Jagdish shone in their parts. The film, reminiscent of Pushpa Keshava, featured well-balanced roles, creating a memorable cinematic experience." A critic from 10TV gave the film 3/5 stars and stated that "Ambajipet Marriage Band is an emotional revenge drama exploring love amidst caste and wealth dynamics, providing a fresh perspective on self-worth.."
