= Aarambham (2024 film) =

2024 Indian film by Ajay Nag V

- Theatrical release poster
- Directed by: Ajay Nag V
- Written by: Ajay Nag V
- Based on: Neenu Ninnolage Khaidi by Anush A Shetty
- Produced by: Abhishek V Thirumalesh
- Starring: Mohan Bhagat; Supritha Sathyanarayan; Bhooshan; Ravindra Vijay
- Cinematography: Devdeep Gandhi Kundu
- Edited by: Preetham Gayathri and Aditya Tiwari
- Music by: Sinjith Yerramilli
- Production company: AVT Entertainment
- Release date: 10 May 2024
- Running time: 132 minutes
- Country: India
- Language: Telugu

Aarambham (transl. Beginning) is a 2024 Indian Telugu-language science fiction drama film written and directed by Ajay Nag V. The film features Mohan Bhagat, Supritha Sathyanarayan, Bhooshan and Ravindra Vijay in important roles. Aarambham is an adaptation of the Kannada novel Neenu Ninnolage Khaidi, and was released on 10 May 2024.

== Plot ==
The story revolves around Prisoner No. 299, Mighel (played by Mohan Bhagat), who is on death row at Kalaghati Jail. On the night before his scheduled execution, Mighel mysteriously vanishes from his cell, leaving no clues behind. This sensational escape baffles the prison authorities and prompts an intense investigation.

Two private detectives, Chaitanya (Ravindra Vijay) and Madhav (Bhooshan Kalyan), are hired to solve the mystery. As they delve deeper into the case, they discover a journal written by Mighel, which leads them to uncover strange and unbelievable truths. The detectives must navigate through a series of unexpected twists and turns to unravel the mystery of Mighel's disappearance and the secrets hidden within the prison walls.

== Cast ==
- Mohan Bhagat as Prisoner 299 Mighel
- Supritha Sathyanarayan as Vasanthi
- Bhooshan Kalyan as Professor Subramanya Rao
- Ravindra Vijay as Detective Chaitanya
- Laxman Meesala as Ganesha
- Boddepalli Abhishek as Detective Madhav
- Surabhi Prabhavathi as Leelamma
- Goparaju Vijay as Giri
- Uma Maheshwar Rao Inabathi as Ponnanna
- Surabhi Jayachandra as Somayya

== Music ==
The film's soundtrack album and background score is composed by Sinjith Yerramilli.

All music is composed by Sinjith Yerramilli.

Track list
No.	Title	Lyrics	Singer(s)	Length
1.	"Anaga Anaga"	Swaroop Goli	S. P. Charan	3:44
2.	"Amaayakanga"	Srikanth Allapu	Shivani Nagaram	4:02
3.	"Tholi Nesthama"	Kittu Vissapragada	Sanjith Hegde, Damini Bhatla	3:35

== Release ==
Aarambham was released on 10 May 2024. Post-theatrical digital streaming rights were acquired by Aha, ETV Win and Amazon Prime Video. The film premiered on ETV Win 23 May 2024. Later, on 5 July 2024, it was premiered on Amazon Prime Video.

== Reception ==
Sangeetha Devi Dundoo of The Hindu gave a mixed review with praise for the Ajay Nag V's work performances of the entire cast. Film Companion too appreciated the performances of the entire cast and stated that "Aarambham is better film whenever love transcends time".
