= Suhas (Telugu actor) =

Indian actor

- Born: Suhas Pagolu; 19 August 1990 (age 36); Vijayawada, Andhra Pradesh, India
- Education: KBN College, Vijayawada
- Occupation: Actor
- Years active: 2018–present
- Spouse: Lalitha (m. 2017)
- Children: 2

Suhas Pagolu is an Indian actor who works in Telugu films. He initially appeared in short films and supporting roles, and made his debut in a lead role with Colour Photo (2020).

== Early life ==
Suhas was born and brought up in Vijayawada, Andhra Pradesh. After graduating from KBN College, he moved to Hyderabad to pursue a career in films.

== Career ==
He started acting in a Telugu YouTube channel Chai Bisket and was featured in several short films including The Athidhi by Sandeep Raj and Kalakaarudu. He received numerous accolades from critics and industry celebrities.

Suhas made his feature film debut with Padi Padi Leche Manasu (2018) and has played supporting roles in several films including Agent Sai Srinivasa Athreya (2019). In a review of the film by The Times of India, the reviewer wrote that "Suhas makes an impressive cameo as Detective Bobby". He appeared in Majili (2019), following which, he is sometimes referred to as "Majili Suhas".

He reprised the role played by Soubin Shahir in Maheshinte Prathikaaram in the Telugu remake Uma Maheswara Ugra Roopasya, alongside Satyadev. Suhas then collaborated with his best friend Sandeep Raj for Colour Photo. He made his debut in a lead role with this film, which stars Sunil as the antagonist. His role in the film as a lead was critically praised and received wide recognition.

In 2021, he starred in Gamanam and Family Drama, playing a serial killer in the latter. HIT: The Second Case and Mishan Impossible were his releases in 2022. In 2024, his first release was Ambajipeta Marriage Band alongside Sharanya Pradeep. He then starred in Sriranga Neethulu featuring Ruhani Sharma, Karthik Rathnam, Viraj Ashwin and Srinivas Avasarala. He then appeared in Prasanna Vadanam, starring alongside Rashi Singh and Viva Harsha and directed by Arjun YK.

He played a village undertaker in Uppu Kappurambu, released on Amazon Prime Video in July 2025, starring alongside Keerthy Suresh. His next theatrical release was Oh Bhama Ayyo Rama. He is currently filming for Cable Chary and Anandrao Adventures.

== Personal life ==
Suhas married his long-time girlfriend, Naga Lalitha, in August 2017. The couple had been in a relationship for several years prior to their marriage, having first met as classmates during their undergraduate studies at KBN College in Vijayawada. In early 2024, Suhas announced the birth of their first child, a son. On September 27, 2025, the actor shared via social media that he and Lalitha had welcomed their second child, also a son, with the caption "It's a Boy AGAIN." He frequently shares glimpses of his family life on his Instagram profile.

== Filmography ==
Key
†	Denotes films that have not yet been released

Year	Title	Role	Notes	Ref.
2018	Padi Padi Leche Manasu	Suhas	Feature film debut	
2019	Majili	Jonty		
2019	Agent Sai Srinivasa Athreya	Agent Bobby		
2019	Dear Comrade	Martin		
2019	Prati Roju Pandage	Suhas		
2020	Uma Maheswara Ugra Roopasya	Korra Suhas		
2020	Colour Photo	Jaya Krishna	Debut in a Lead role	
2021	Rang De	Suhas		
2021	Ardha Shathabdham	Koti		
2021	Heads and Tales	Anisha's friend		
2021	Family Drama	Rama		
2021	Gamanam	Abdullah		
2022	Mishan Impossible	Gilaani	Cameo appearance	
2022	HIT: The Second Case	Kumar	SIIMA Award for Best Actor in a Negative Role – Telugu	
2023	Writer Padmabhushan	Padmabhushan		
2023	Manu Charitra	Nandu		
2024	Ambajipeta Marriage Band	Mallikarjun "Malli"		
2024	Sriranga Neethulu	Suhas		
2024	Prasanna Vadanam	Surya		
2024	Darling	Rahul	Cameo appearance	
2024	Gorre Puranam	Ravi		
2024	Janaka Aithe Ganaka	Prasad		
2025	Jaat	Venkat Rao	Hindi film	
2025	Uppu Kappurambu	Chinna		
2025	Oh Bhama Ayyo Rama	Ram	Also sang "Gully Step" song	
2025	They Call Him OG	Arms Supplier (Only in Theatrical Cut)	Cameo appearance	
2025	Mowgli	Jayakrishna alias Kittu	Cameo appearance	
2026	Hey Balwanth	Krishna Balwanth		
2026	Mandaadi	Sattapuli	Tamil film	
2026	Cable Reddy †	TBA	Filming	
2026	Anandrao Adventures †	TBA	Filming	

=== Short films ===
- The Athidi
- Kalakaarudu
- Radhika
- Nandan – A Psycho Thriller
- Bangaram
- Nenorakam

=== Television ===
Year	Title	Role	Network	Notes
2017	Nenu Mee Kalyan	Lucky	YouTube	Mini-series; 5 episodes
2020	Shit Happens		Aha	Special appearance
2023	Anger Tales	Paccha Bottu Seenu	Disney+ Hotstar	Episode 1 (Benefit Show)
