= Uma Maheswara Ugra Roopasya =

2020 film by Venkatesh Maha

- Theatrical Film Poster
- Directed by: Venkatesh Maha
- Screenplay by: Venkatesh Maha
- Story by: Syam Pushkaran
- Based on: Maheshinte Prathikaaram (2016)
- Produced by: Vijaya Praveena Paruchuri MD; Shobu Yarlagadda; Prasad Devineni
- Starring: Satyadev; Naresh; Suhas; Raghavan; Hari Chandana; Roopa Koduvayur
- Cinematography: Appu Prabhakar
- Edited by: Ravi Teja Girijala
- Music by: Bijibal
- Production companies: Arka Media Works; Mahayana Motion Pictures
- Distributed by: Netflix
- Release date: 30 July 2020
- Running time: 135 minutes
- Country: India
- Language: Telugu

Uma Maheswara Ugra Roopasya (transl. Of Uma Maheswara's Anger), (Note: Uma Sahitha Maheswara refers to a soft-heartened person. Ugya Roopasya means 'anger' in Sanskrit. The title refers to the anger of a soft-heartened person: the main character Uma Maheswara Rao.) also known by the initialism UMUR, is a 2020 Indian Telugu-language comedy drama film, directed by Venkatesh Maha. It was produced by film producer duo Shobu Yarlagadda and Prasad Devineni alongside Vijaya Praveena Paruchuri, under their respective banners Arka Media Works and Manayana Motion Pictures. The film stars Satyadev as Uma Maheswara Rao, alongside Naresh, Suhas, Raghavan, Hari Chandana and Roopa Koduvayur.

The film is a remake of the Malayalam film Maheshinte Prathikaaram (2016), which itself based on a true incident in the life of Thampan Purushan from Thuravoor, Cherthala. It follows Uma Maheswara Rao, a photographer, who attempts to defuse a conflict between his friend and a group of youngsters passing through their village, and is knocked to the ground. Defeated in the tussle and unable to fight back, he is embarrassed in front of his neighbours. Mahesh publicly vows that he will not wear his slippers again until he has avenged the humiliation.

Principal photography of the film took place in July 2019, and shot predominantly at the Araku Valley for 62 days. The film has music composed by Bijibal on his Telugu debut, who scored for the original counterpart film. The cinematography was handled by Appu Prabhakar and editing done by Raviteja Girijala respectively.

The film was initially scheduled for a theatrical release on 17 April 2020 but was postponed due to the COVID-19 pandemic. It was later directly premiered through the streaming platform Netflix on 30 July 2020. The film received positive reviews from critics, praising the performance of Satyadev, and the direction, screenplay and the adaptation.

== Plot ==
Uma Maheswara Rao is a small-time photographer who lives with his father, Manohar Rao. They run the digital photography Bhavana Studio in the Prakash region of Araku in Andhra Pradesh. Next to the studio is a bone-setting shop owned by Mahesh's good friend, Babji. His assistant is Korra Suhas, who came to Babji, to learn about the study of traditional bone-setting. Mahesh is in a relationship with Swati, his high-school sweetheart.

Babji becomes involved in a trivial argument with a loafer in the centre of the village. The dispute escalates, but passersby calm them down. However, Suhas appears and attacks the man who had argued with Babji. The man, joined by Joginath, jumps on Suhas in retaliation. Noticing the commotion, Mahesh tries to calm everyone down but Jogi, furious at Mahesh's authoritative stance, beats him up. Manohar breaks up the fight. Embarrassed, Mahesh vows to get back at Jogi and pledges that he will wear slippers only after he has avenged his humiliation.

Swati is forced to end her relationship with Mahesh and marry a nurse residing in Canada. He learns about Jogi's whereabouts from Suhas and visits the garage where he apparently works as a welder. Its owner tells him that Jogi left for a better job in Dubai. Despite Babji's advice that he should forget the incident, Mahesh resolves to wait for Jogi's return; several weeks later, he enrolls in a kung fu course.

Jyothi, a young college student, goes to Bhavana Studio. She tells Mahesh that she wants to participate in a women's magazine's cover competition and asks him to make her look as good as possible. Perplexed at the unusual request, Mahesh conducts the photo shoot. Jyothi's photograph turns out to be dull and unimpressive, and her irritation makes Mahesh question his skill as a photographer. Upset, he turns to his father for advice. Manohar explains photography as an art to his son. Mahesh goes through his father's photograph collection, finally understanding their angles and lighting, and gets an idea.

Instead of his familiar still photography, Mahesh photographs Jyothi in motion and sends the best photo to the magazine. Shortly afterward, Jyothi goes to Mahesh's house with the magazine containing her photo. Although she rebukes him for photographing her without permission, she also praises the photo. They become interested in each other, and soon fall in love. Jyothi realises this first, and calls Mahesh to talk about their future. She tells him that she is Jogi's younger sister, but his agitation is overshadowed by love and he decides to continue their relationship.

Several weeks later, Jogi is fired from his job for slapping his manager and is deported back to India. The following day, Mahesh and Babji challenge him to a hand-to-hand combat. After a few minutes of fighting, Mahesh pins down Jogi and Babji declares him the winner. The movie ends with Mahesh visits Jogi in a hospital on the next day and introduces himself to his mother in front of Jyothi. He admits his love for Jyothi and asks Jogi, if he agrees to the relationship. Later in credits it shows that Mahesh and Jyothi are together now.

== Cast ==
- Satyadev as Uma Maheswara Rao "Mahesh"
- Naresh as Babji
- Suhas as Korra Suhas
- Raghavan as Manohar Rao
- Hari Chandana Koppisetti as Swati
- Roopa Koduvayur as Jyothi
- Kushalini Pulapa as Mithila
- Ravindra Vijay as Jognath
- TNR as Nancharayya
- Jabardasth Ramprasad as Chandru
- Jyothi as Swati's mother
- Sreedhar Reddy as Kung Fu master
- Ajay Vegesna as Footwear Shop Owner
- Karuna Kumar as Karuna
- Vijaya Praveena Paruchuri as Brinda
- Venkatesh Maha as Tea seller (cameo appearance)

== Production ==
Vijaya Praveena Paruchuri MD bought the remake rights and had Venkatesh Maha direct after bringing on board Arka Media Works as co producers. . The team announced Satyadev to play the lead role, whilst debutantes Hari Chandana and Roopa Koduvayur play the lead actresses in the film. Alongst the film's technical crew, the film has Malayalam film composer Bijibal in his Telugu debut, whilst Appu Prabhakar and Raviteja Girijala, handling the cinematography and editing respectively. The film was shot in the remote regions of Araku Valley, during July 2019 and went ahead for 62 days. The principal photography was completed in November 2019.

== Soundtrack ==
Uma Maheswara Ugra Roopasya

Soundtrack album by Bijibal
- Released: 23 July 2020
- Recorded: 2020
- Genre: Feature film soundtrack
- Length: 14:08
- Language: Telugu
- Label: Aditya Music
- Producer: Bijibal

Bijibal chronology
Kozhipporu (2020)	Uma Maheswara Ugra Roopasya (2020)	Varthamanam (2020)

Singles from Uma Maheswara Ugra Roopasya
- 1. "Ningi Chutte" Released: 6 March 2020; 2. "Anandam" Released: 6 July 2020; 3. "Rapavalu" Released: 13 July 2020

The film's soundtrack and score were composed by Bijibal, who scored music for the original counterpart film. All the songs in the film were released as singles, before being released as an album on 23 July 2020, by Aditya Music. The lyrics for the songs were written by Viswa, Rehman and Raghukul Mokirala.

The first single "Ningi Chutte" with lyrics by Viswa and performed by Vijay Yesudas was released on 6 March 2020. The second single "Anandam" was released on 6 July and featured lyrics by Rehman and vocals by Gowtham Bharadwaj and Soumya Ramakrishnan. The third single, "Repavalu", was released on 13 July. The song was written by Rahman and Raghukul Mokirala and is sung by Bijibal and Sangeetha Srikanth. The fourth song "Nuvvemo" sung by Kaala Bhairava and Sithara Krishnakumar, was released as a part of the soundtrack album.

Track listing
No.	Title	Lyrics	Singer(s)	Length
1.	"Ningi Chutte"	Viswa	Vijay Yesudas	3:28
2.	"Anandam"	Rehman	Gowtham Bharadwaj, Soumya Ramakrishnan	4:38
3.	"Repavalu"	Rehman, Raghukul Mokirala	Bijibal, Sangeetha Srikanth	3:32
4.	"Nuvvemo"	Rehman	Kaala Bhairava, Sithara Krishnakumar	2:29

== Release ==
The film was initially scheduled to release on 17 April 2020 but was postponed due to the COVID-19 pandemic. On 5 June 2020, it was announced that the film was cleared by the Central Board of Film Certification. Producers then explored the option of releasing on digital platforms instead of a traditional theatre release. The film was released directly through the streaming platform Netflix, on 30 July 2020.

== Reception ==
Hemanth Kumar of Firstpost stated "Uma Maheswara Ugra Roopasya packs in plenty of humour; it's a pleasant drama with a backdrop that’s rarely explored in Telugu cinema, that normalises the idea that heroism doesn’t have to be testimony of one’s masculinity." Sowmya Rajendran of The News Minute gave 3.5 out of 5 stars and stated that "Uma Maheswara Ugra Roopasya is a faithful remake which retains the spirit of original." Neeshita Nyayapati of The Times of India rated the film 3.5 out of 5 and stated, "The cast also make the film their own without aping the original. It is these beautiful details (that might miss a non-native’s understanding) and the feel-good moments it’s dotted with that make this film worth watching."

Sangeetha Devi Dundoo of The Hindu reviewed as "UMUR is a welcome addition to new-age Telugu cinema, offering plenty of humour and moments to savour." Haricharan Pudipeddi of Hindustan Times gave the verdict "Uma Maheswara Ugra Roopasya is built on the of masculinity and rage. It questions the need for virility and the extent men can go to flaunt." Writing for the Film Companion, Baradwaj Rangan stated "Uma Maheswara Ugra Roopasya isn’t as perfect as his earlier film, but it’s perhaps a better indicator of his sensibilities. To take someone else’s property and still show some kind of authorial signature means you’re holding on to who you essentially are. This is the rare remake with soul."

== Accolades ==
Award (Note: Awards, festivals and organizations are in alphabetical order.)	Date of ceremony (Note: Date is linked to the article about the awards held that year, wherever possible.)	Category	Recipient(s)	Result	Ref.
South Indian International Movie Awards	11–12 September 2021	Best Film – Telugu	Arka Media Works, Mahayana Motion Pictures	Nominated	
South Indian International Movie Awards	11–12 September 2021	Best Director – Telugu	Venkatesh Maha	Nominated	
South Indian International Movie Awards	11–12 September 2021	Best Actor – Telugu	Satyadev	Nominated	
South Indian International Movie Awards	11–12 September 2021	Best Supporting Actor – Telugu	Naresh	Nominated	
South Indian International Movie Awards	11–12 September 2021	Best Female Debut – Telugu	Roopa Koduvayur	Won	
