= Dance forms of Andhra Pradesh =

The dance forms of Andhra Pradesh take on a wide variety of colors, costumes, and types; and involve different settings and musical instruments.

== Vilasini Natyam ==
Vilasini Natyam is a dance tradition of devadasis in Andhra Pradesh. It faced near-extinct after the anti-deva dasi act and fortunately revived by few remaining dancers. It is yet to receive Indian Classical Dance status.

== Andhra Natyam ==
Andhra Natyam is a classical dance form originating in the courts of Andhra Ikshvakus. This traditional dance form, having a history of 2000 years was lost in the Mughal and British era, and was revived in the 20th century.

== Bhamakalapam ==
Bhama refers to Satyabhama, Krishna's beautiful but jealous wife and kalapam means complaint or argument. Bhamakalpam is both a theatre form (like Gollakalpam) and a drama. The drama was created by Siddhendra Yogi in the 17th century for the devotional use of Kuchipudi performers. The theatre is performed by several troupes in Andhra Pradesh and is a fine example of the feminine movements in dance (lasya) as opposed to the masculine tandava movements of Kathakali and Yakshagana.

== Burrakatha ==
Burrakatha is the new name (twentieth century) for the theatre known as Jangam Katha. The jangams were wandering Shiva worshippers.

Burra refers to the tambura, a musical instrument played by the main storyteller. The main performer narrates a story, plays music, and dances to it. The co-performers play drums and address him constantly and enrich certain events in the story with their short sentences. It is one of janapada Kalalu.

== Veeranatyam ==
A very old form of dance in the state of Andhra Pradesh that has a lot of religious significance attached to it; is Veeranatyam. This fascinating kind of dance form is also known as Veerangam and Veerabhadra Nrityam. The term ‘Veera’ literally means brave. Thus as the name of the dance form suggests it is the dance of the brave.

The illustration of Veeranatyam is found in Hindu Mythology. Once Lord Shiva's wife, Sati Devi was humiliated at a function. This made the Shiva-the God of destruction, furious. Lord Shiva, outraged at the humiliation met by his consort, Lord Shiva picked a relic out of His hair or ‘Jatajuta’, which created Veerabhadra. He is believed to have portrayed His extreme anger by performing a vigorous dance; thus justifying the name Veeranatynam. It was the dance of ‘Pralayam’ or Destruction.

The angry destructive Shiva or the ‘Pralayankar’ in the ferocity of rage tarnished the ‘Dakshayagna Vatika’, the place where the function was held.

The Veerabhadriya (Veeramusti community, changed its name recently from Veeramusti to Veerabhadriya) which claims to be the descendant of Veerabhadra, performs this vigorous dance with instruments like Tambura, Soolam, Dolu, Tasha and Veeranam usually at Draksharamam in East Godavari District of Andhra Pradesh, which is believed to be Dakshavatika, the birthplace of Veerabhadra

Natyam or Veerabhadra Natyam is performed by men in Hyderabad, East and West Godavari, Kurnool, Anantapur, Warangal, and Khammam.

The first stage is the holding of "Veerabhadra Pallem", a huge plate carried from the palms to the elbows bearing a camphor fire. The dance goes on vigorously to the tempo of several percussion instruments until the fire is extinguished. Part of this ceremony consists of the ‘Khadgalu’ recital, where a pujari brandishes a long sword representing that of Veerabhadra.

The second stage lies in holding a long consecrated pole, marked with Vibhuti (sacred ash) representing the ‘Dhwaja Sthamba’ of the Lord with bells tied to the top.

In the third stage, the performers dance with spears and tridents pierced into their ankles, hands, and tongue. This is called ‘Narasam’. The dancers are dressed in colorful knee-length dhotis secured by waist-sashes smeared with vibhuti all over their bodies. The main percussion instrument is the ‘Veeranam’ or ‘war-drum’.

Veeranatyam initially started as a ritual that was performed in all the Shiva or the Shaivite temples in honor of Lord Shiva. At present, the followers of Veerabhadra mostly perform this form of performing arts. The community is known as the Veeramusti community in the state of Andhra Pradesh.

Dressed in colorful ‘Dhotis’ and ‘Dates’ the dancers perform Veerabhadra. Musical and rhythmic instruments like Dolu, Tasha, Veena, Thambura, and Soolam are used while the dance is being performed. To the rhythm of drumbeats, the dancers perform the dance of destruction. Long steps and dexterous hand movements are required for performing Veeranatyam. Draksharama in East Godavari district especially witnesses this dance form.

Veerabhadra dancer holds Veera khagan (sword) dances in synchronization to words called 'Dhandakas' chanted by the other dancers beating simultaneously Veera Bhadra pallet, which is similar to war cry to challenge enemy, Veera Bhadra dance is very furious and expresses a high degree of emotions.

== Butta bommalu ==
A typical folk dance form, popular in Tanuku of West Godavari District of Andhra Pradesh, Butta Bommalu which literally means basket toys are made of wood-husk, dry grass and cow dung. Each dancer wears a different mask over the head and shoulders enlarging the scope of the performer and dances to a non-verbal rhythm which adds color to the movements.

== Tholu bommalaata ==
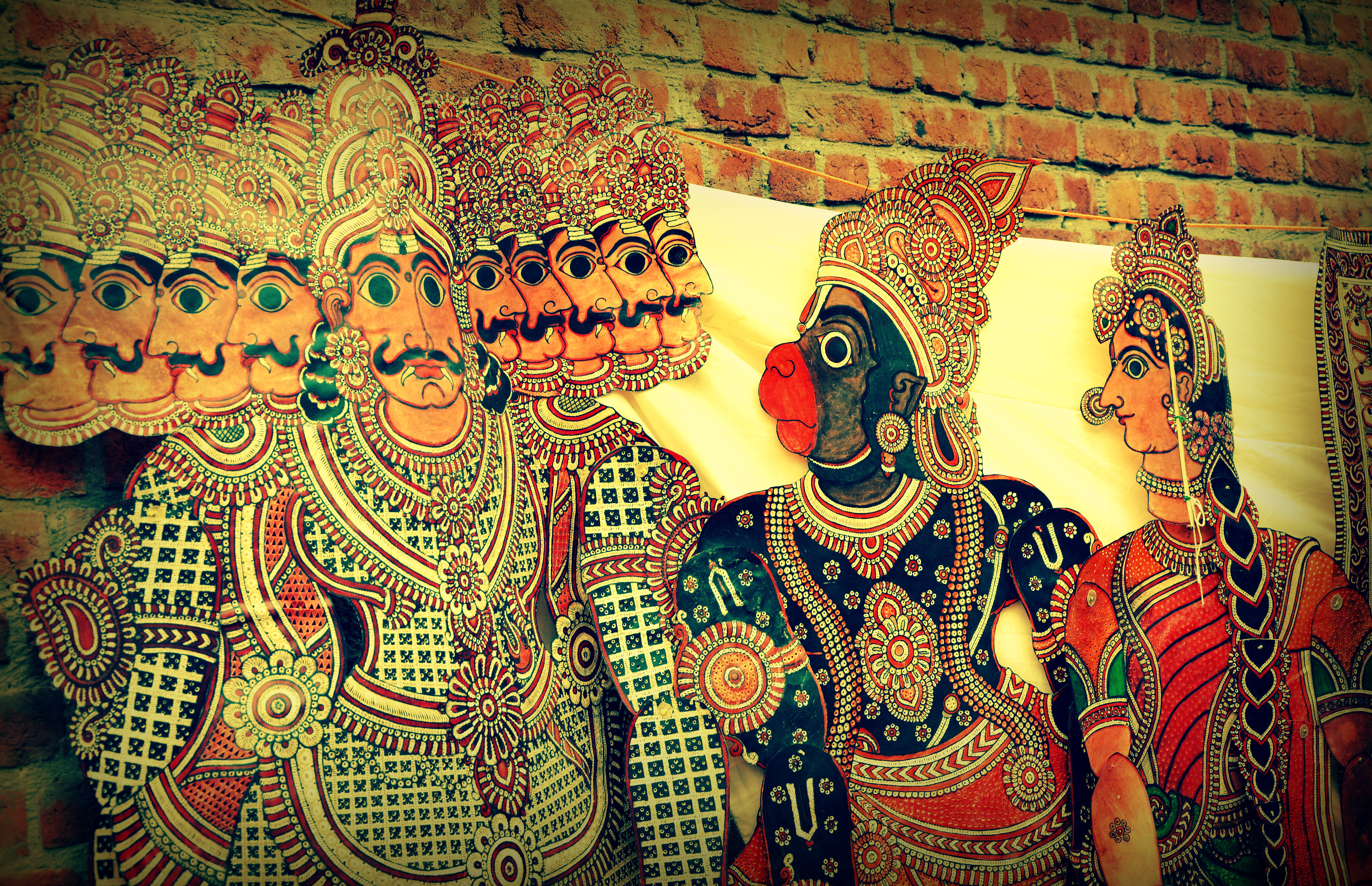
Hanuman and Sita puppets from the tholu bommalata tradition of Andhra Pradesh, India

Tholu bommalata is a form of puppetry which originated in the Indian state of Andhra Pradesh. It mainly depicts episodes from the epics. Puppets are large, with a jointed waist, shoulders, elbows, and knees. The classical music of the region influences the music played in the show.

== Dappu ==
Made of goatskin, a tambourine-like the drum is beaten with sticks creating a rhythm that is softened only by the ankle bells that the 16 to 20 dancers wear. Part of a Telangana custom which sees the Dappu dancers at the front of any procession, whether it be for jatakas, festivals, or marriages, this is truly a celebration of the percussive powers of dance. This lively art form hails from Nizamabad District. The performers wear colorful make-up and even more colorful costumes dance to the musical patterns set by cymbals, tabla and a harmonium. Mythological themes are usually enacted and the audience is rural. It is one of janapada Kalalau.

== Tappeta Gullu ==
Popular in Srikakulam and Vizianagaram Districts, this is a devotional dance that invokes the Rain God with its vigor, rhythm, and tempo. Also performed during festivals, the dance sees 15 to 20 vibrant artists with drums around their necks creating mesmerizing beats and heart-stopping acrobatics

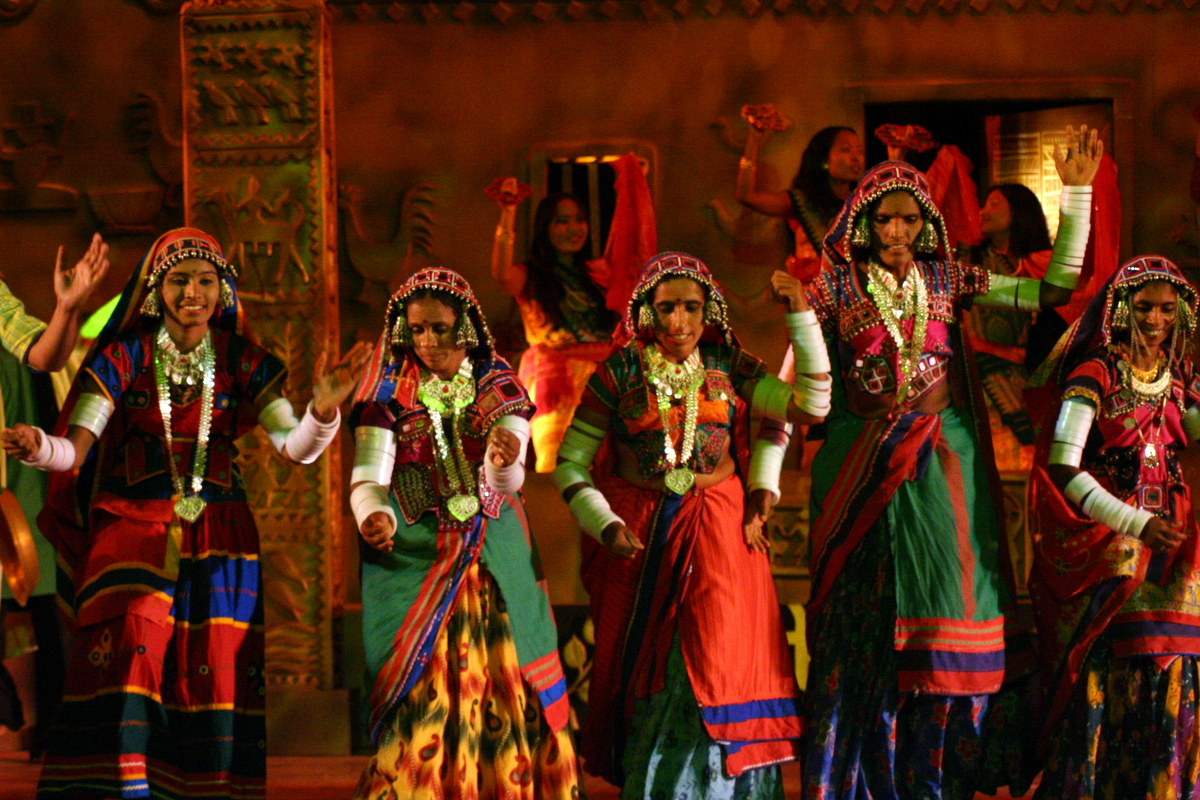
Lambadi Dance

== Lambadi ==
Associated with daily tasks harvesting, planting, sowing, etc., the Lambadi is performed by the Banjaras, a semi-nomadic tribe seen all over Andhra Pradesh. Costumes embroidered with glass beads and mirrors, ornate jewelry, ivory bangles, brass anklets, and a natural rhythm make this dance a colorful exposition of joy which is the highlight of many a festive occasion

== Dhimsa ==
Dhimsa originated in Koraput district in the Odisha State. Dhimsa means "sound of the foot steps". Dhimsa dance is a dance of young and old, men and women of Valmiki, Bogata, Khond, and Kotia tribes living in the enchanting Araku Valley in the hilly tracts of Vishakhapatnam district. A monthly magazine is published by the name of Dhimsa in [Telugu language] Tribals dance during the months of Chaitra i.e. March and April, on weddings and other festivities. During the festivals dancers of one village visit the other to participate in the dance and join the community feast. Such dances are known as "Sankidi Kelbar". The unique feature of Dhimsa dance is that it canalizes friendship and fraternity between the people of different villages. This being traditionally a tribal dance, the women folk attired in typical tribal dress and ornaments dance in the group to the tune of Mori, Kiridi, Tudumu, Dappu, and Jodukommulu.

Ahimsa had branched off to eight different categories of dances. Boda Dimsa is a worship dance in honor of the village goddess. Men on the right and women on the left form two rows and hold one another firmly in their hands the backs. The first man in the right row with a bunch of peacock feathers in hand in rhythmical steps takes the lead while the last person in the left row joins him. Then all dancers to the sounds of anklets move zigzag in a serpent dance in a circle crying "Hari" and "Hui" return to the rows. In Gundert dims or Usku Dimsa a male dancer while singing sends an invitation to the females to dance with him. Thereafter, the male and female with firm steps move forward and backward stride in a circle. In God Beta Dimsa the dancers bending forward and rising up with a swing go about twenty-five steps and return in the same manner four to five times. Poster-Tola Dimsa dance symbolizes the picking up leaves. Half of the dancers stand side by side in a row, while the rest stand behind the first row in the same manner and keep their hands on shoulders of dancers standing before. Turning their heads to the right and left the two rows march forward and backward. Bhag Dimsa is a dance of art as to how to escape from a tiger's attack. Half of the dancers form a circle holding hand in hand. They stand on their toes, bowing and raising their heads. Moving around swiftly, the rest enter the circle and form a "serpent Coil". This is repeated several times. Natikari Dimsa is a solo dance danced by the Valmikis on the Diwali festival in particular. Kunda Dimsa is a dance where the dancers push each other with their shoulders while swinging rhythmically. Baya Dimsa dance is the dance of a tribal magician when he is possessed by the village goddess. All the villagers with their hands bowed down to imitate the "Ganachari". This continues till the magician returns to normalcy Dimsa dances exhibit community unity without discrimination. These dance forms essentially amplifying their ways of life belong to their cultural heritage. Even though things have changed much, yet the hillmen had retained their traditions unspoiled. Through their dances cannot be included in any classical forms, yet they conform to the rhythm of either "Aditala" or "Rupakatala".

== Kolatam ==
'Kolatam', or the stick dance, is one of the most popular dance narratives in Andhra Pradesh. It is also called Kolannalu or Kolkolannalu. A rural art usually performed during village festivals, kolata kim is a combination of rhythmic movements, songs, and music. It is known as Dandia ras in Gujarat, Garbha in Rajasthan, etc. The Kolatam group comprises dancers in the range of 8 to 40. In kolatam, performed by 8 to 40 artists grouped in pairs, The stick provides the main rhythm. The artists led by the leader move into two circles, the inner circle receiving the strikes while the outer circle delivering them. Kolatam offers a great variety of entertainment to the spectators as well as the participants.

Kolatam is also called Kolanna in the Prakasam district of Andhra Pradesh state. Also dances is Gobbi, Madhuri, Chari, Kumi
