= Sunil filmography =

Filmography article

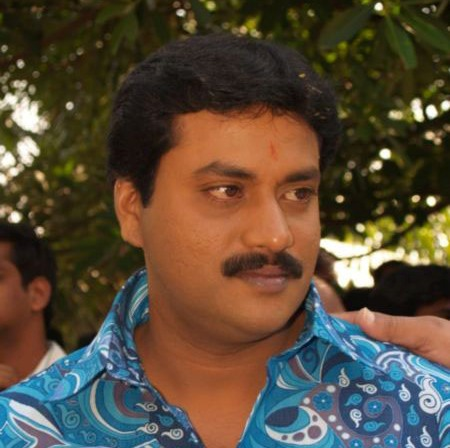
Sunil

Sunil is an Indian actor and comedian who predominantly works in Telugu films alongside few Tamil and Malayalam films. In his career of two decades, he has appeared in over 180 films.

== As an actor ==
Key
†	Denotes films that have not yet been released

=== Telugu films ===
List of Telugu films and roles
Year	Title	Role	Notes	Ref.
1998	Pape Naa Pranam	Waiter		
2000	Nuvve Kavali	Sunil		
2000	Chirunavvutho	Sunil		
2001	Family Circus	Gang Member		
2001	Naa Manasistha Raa	Cab driver		
2001	Tholi Valapu	Giri		
2001	Nuvvu Nenu	Venkatesh		
2001	Nuvvu Naaku Nachav	Banthi		
2001	Manasantha Nuvve	Sunil		
2002	Nuvvu Leka Nenu Lenu	Karri Seenu		
2002	Premaku Swagatam	Tenali		
2002	Kalusukovalani	Achi		
2002	Aaduthu Paaduthu	Papi		
2002	Vasu	Balu		
2002	Santosham	Kranthi Kumar a. k. a. Seetayya		
2002	Sreeram	Megaserial Mahadeva		
2002	Neetho	Johnny		
2002	Indra	Balu		
2002	Sontham	Seshagiri		
2002	Holi	Raja		
2002	Okato Number Kurraadu	Sunil		
2002	Nuvve Nuvve	Pandu		
2002	Pilisthe Palukutha	Ajay's friend		
2002	Bobby	Hotel Manager		
2002	Yuva Rathna	Sunil		
2002	Thotti Gang	Sathi Babu		
2002	Premalo Pavani Kalyan	Arjun		
2002	Manmadhudu	Bunk Seenu		
2003	Naaga	Ravi		
2003	Pellam Oorelithe	Samba		
2003	Gangotri	Exam Supervisor		
2003	Run	Mohan	Telugu version	
2003	Ottesi Cheputunna	Nela Baludu		
2003	Vijayam	Srinivas		
2003	Ninne Istapaddanu	Bangaru Babu		
2003	Oka Raju Oka Rani	Mahesh's sidekick		
2003	Vasantham	Ramesh		
2003	Kalyana Ramudu	Chari		
2003	Dongodu	Justice Chowdhary		
2003	Simhachalam	Raju		
2003	Oka Radha Iddaru Krishnula Pelli	Bala Raju		
2003	Tagore	Boost		
2003	Ela Cheppanu	Sunil		
2003	Toli Choopulone	White and White Simhachalam		
2003	Ori Nee Prema Bangaram Kaanu	Ganesh		
2003	Nenu Pelliki Ready	Rajesh		
2003	Nee Manasu Naaku Telusu	Kapali a. k. a. Kapil		
2003	Neeke Manasichaanu	Sattibabu		
2004	Lakshmi Narasimha	Raj		
2004	Varsham	Jagan "The Gun"		
2004	Athade Oka Sainyam	Thief		
2004	Love Today	Dharma		
2004	Anandamanandamaye	"Panchatantram" Seenu		
2004	Malliswari	Padmanabham a. k. a. Paddu		
2004	Mee Intikoste Em Istaaru Maa Intikoste Em Testaru	Teja		
2004	Seenu Vasanthi Lakshmi	Seenu		
2004	Nenunnanu	Tip Sundaram		
2004	Kushi Kushiga	Server Prakash		
2004	Oka Pellam Muddu Rendo Pellam Vaddu	Satish		
2004	Pedababu	Bapineedu		
2004	Aarya	Ticket Collector "Punch" Falaknama		
2004	Naani	Vishwanath a. k. a. X		
2004	Koduku	Balasubramanyam		
2004	Pallakilo Pellikoothuru	Chef		
2004	Donga Dongadi	Rockfort Chandu		
2004	Naa Autograph	Sathyam		
2004	Gudumba Shankar	Prabhu		
2004	Cheppave Chirugali	Gopi		
2004	Aaptudu	Venkat		
2004	Suryam	Gaali Seenu		
2004	Mass	Aditya a. k. a. Adi		
2005	Balu ABCDEFG	Shankar		
2005	Nuvvostanante Nenoddantana	Banda		
2005	Radha Gopalam	Lakshmana Rao		
2005	Sravanamasam	Kanchu Babu		
2005	Sada Mee Sevalo	Bunty		
2005	Soggadu	Venkat		
2005	Subash Chandra Bose	Chandram's sidekick		
2005	Mr. Errababu	Erra Babu's sidekick		
2005	Hungama	Balaraju		
2005	Bhadra	Bullabbayi		
2005	Andarivaadu	Veerendra's nephew		
2005	Oka Oorilo	Seenu's servant		
2005	Kanchanamala Cable TV	Sudarshan's assistant		
2005	Super	Journalist		
2005	Athadu	Ramana		
2005	Andhrudu	Thief		
2005	Allari Bullodu	Bobby		
2005	Political Rowdy	Rohit		
2005	Bhageeratha	Nanda		
2005	Modati Cinema	Sri		
2005	Sri	Subbarao		
2005	Jai Chiranjeeva	Dhanushkoti		
2006	Lakshmi	Suresh		
2006	Chukkallo Chandrudu	Puppy		
2006	Sarada Saradaga	Sunil		
2006	Sivakasi	Kiran Kumar	Telugu version	
2006	Sri Ramadasu	Ramana Sastry		
2006	Pournami	Pournami's elder brother	100th film	
2006	Kithakithalu	Sathi		
2006	Amrutha Varsham		Telugu version	
2006	Game	Kulkarni		
2006	Bommarillu	Sathi		
2006	Andala Ramudu	Ramu		
2006	Stalin	Stalin's younger brother		
2006	Boss	Sunil		
2006	Gopi - Goda Meeda Pilli	Resort Manager Karunanidhi		
2006	Pellaina Kothalo	Chalapathi		
2006	Rakhi	Mohan Reddy		
2006	Annavaram	Raju		
2007	Yogi	Ramu		
2007	Pagale Vennela	Waiter		
2007	Athili Sattibabu LKG	Athili Sathibabu's brother		
2007	Dhee	Kathi		
2007	Classmates	Baddu		
2007	Aadavari Matalaku Arthale Verule	Srinu		
2007	Aata	Vicky's brother-in-law		
2007	Raju Bhai	Singer		
2007	Bhookailas	Police Inspector		
2007	Dubai Seenu	Dubai Seenu's cousin		
2007	Bahumati	Lawyer		
2007	Satyabhama	Sunil		
2007	Shankar Dada Zindabad	Kumar		
2007	Hello Premistara	Sunil		
2007	Julayi	Sunil		
2007	Pellaindi Kaani	Subramaniam a. k. a. Subbu		
2007	Athidhi	Amrita's fiancé		
2007	Bhajantrilu			
2007	Nava Vasantham	Vijay		
2007	Godava	Train Ticket Collector		
2007	Navvule Navvulu	Police officer		
2008	Krishna	Sunil		
2008	Pourudu	Samyukta's prospective groom		
2008	Vaana	Himself	Guest appearance	
2008	Swagatam	Sunil Honda		
2008	Krishnarjuna	Arjun's sidekick		
2008	Andamaina Manasulo	Tushar's friend		
2008	Ontari	Subbu		
2008	Idi Sangathi	Neeladri		
2008	Premabhishekam	Sunil		
2008	Jalsa	Bunk Seenu		
2008	Bhale Dongalu	Taxi Driver		
2008	Kalidasu	Basha		
2008	Michael Madana Kamaraju	Kamaraju		
2008	Parugu	Krishna's sidekick		
2008	Kantri	Rajni Haasan		
2008	Bujjigadu	Sathi a. k. a. Tokyo Johnny		
2008	Pandurangadu	Narasimha Sastry		
2008	Ready	Janaki		
2008	Ullasamga Utsahamga	Instant Investor		
2008	Kathanayakudu	Shanmugam		
2008	Baladoor	Seenu		
2008	Adivishnu	Subbarao		
2008	Chintakayala Ravi	Pendurthi Babu		
2008	Rainbow	Sunil Bachchan		
2008	Nenu Meeku Telusa?	Kishore		
2008	King	Sarath		
2009	Maska	Krish's sidekick		
2009	Rechipo	Siva's friend		
2009	Aa Okkadu	Chandra		
2009	Raju Maharaju	Arjun		
2009	Rajavari Chepala Cheruvu	News TV Ghajinikanth		
2009	Neramu Siksha	Advocate		
2009	Oy!	Abhishek		
2009	Magadheera	Harsha's friend		
2009	Neelo Naalo	Lover	Telugu version	
2009	Josh	Bujji	150th film	
2009	Drona	Indu's uncle		
2009	Ek Niranjan	Chanti Babu		
2009	Pravarakhyudu	Ravi		
2010	Om Shanti	Ranadhir		
2010	Shambo Shiva Shambo	Kumar		
2010	Bindaas	Sarath		
2010	Varudu	Himself	Guest appearance	
2010	Maryada Ramanna	Kovelamudi Ramu		
2010	Khaleja	Babji		
2011	Mirapakay	Charukesha		
2011	Katha Screenplay Darsakatvam Appalaraju	Appalaraju		
2011	Dongala Mutha	Richard		
2012	Poola Rangadu	Ranga		
2013	Mr. Pellikoduku	Buchi Babu		
2013	Tadakha	Sivarama Krishna		
2014	Bhimavaram Bullodu	Rambabu		
2016	Krishnashtami	Krishna		
2016	Eedu Gold Ehe	Bangarraju		
2016	Jakkanna	Jakkana / Ganesh		
2017	Ungarala Rambabu	Ram Babu		
2017	2 Countries	Ullaas Kumar		
2018	Silly Fellows	Soori		
2018	Aravinda Sametha Veera Raghava	Neelambari		
2018	Amar Akbar Anthony	Bobby		
2018	Padi Padi Leche Manasu	Chatur Ramalingam		
2018	Operation 2019	Himself	Special appearance in the song "Life is Like a Party"	
2019	Chitralahari	Michael "Mike"		
2019	Chanakya	Seenu		
2020	Ala Vaikunthapurramuloo	Sitaram		
2020	Disco Raja	Utham Kumar / Antony Das		
2020	Colour Photo	Inspector Rama Raju		
2021	Jai Sena	Devadas		
2021	Kanabadutaledu	Detective Rama Krishna		
2021	Ichata Vahanamulu Niluparadu	Actor	Cameo appearance	
2021	Heads and Tales	God	Cameo appearance	
2021	Pushpaka Vimanam	Rangam		
2021	Pushpa: The Rise	Mangalam Srinu		
2022	Bheemla Nayak	Prisoner	Special appearance in the song "Bheemla Nayak"	
2022	Son of India	News reporter		
2022	F3	Katthi Seenu		
2022	Chor Bazaar	Home Mister of Telangana		
2022	Darja	ACP Paidipati Shiva Shankar		
2022	Thank You	Himself	Special appearance in the "Farewell Song"	
2022	Godfather	Koti		
2022	Tees Maar Khan	Chakri		
2022	Wanted Pandugod	Pandugadu		
2022	Geetha	Saradhi		
2022	Sita Ramam	TC Varadhi		
2022	Bujji Ila Raa	CI Mohammad Khayyam		
2022	Ginna	NRI groom	Special appearance	
2022	Mukhachitram	Dr. Neeladri Varma		
2022	Cheppalani Undhi			
2022	Urvasivo Rakshasivo	Sree's uncle		
2022	Sivudu		Only dubbed version released	
2022	S5 No Exit	Suleman Khan		
2023	Valentines Night	Krishnamohan		
2023	Mr. King	Driver		
2023	Organic Mama Hybrid Alludu	Monikonda		
2023	Virupaksha	Abbai Raju		
2023	Bhuvana Vijayam	‘Feelings Star’ Preetham Kumar		
2023	Katha Venuka Katha	Satya		
2023	Nenu Student Sir	Techie		
2023	Maya Petika	Narayana		
2023	Slum Dog Husband		Cameo appearance	
2024	Guntur Kaaram	Dokka Lenin Babu		
2024	Bootcut Balaraju	P. K.		
2024	Vey Dharuvey	Banu		
2024	Geethanjali Malli Vachindi	Killer Nani		
2024	Paarijatha Parvam	Bar Seenu		
2024	Harom Hara	Palani Swamy		
2024	Mathu Vadalara 2	Michael		
2024	Swag	Vasudeva		
2024	Mechanic Rocky	Ranki Reddy		
2024	Zebra	Madhan Gupta		
2024	Pushpa 2: The Rule	Mangalam Srinu		
2025	Game Changer	Side Satyam		
2025	Ramam Raghavam	Naidu		
2025	Mad Square	Maxx		
2025	Hari Hara Veera Mallu	Subbanna		
2025	Divya Drusthi	Ajay	Direct release on Sun NXT	
2026	Bhartha Mahasayulaku Wignyapthi	Sudharshan		
2026	Nari Nari Naduma Murari	Satyamurthy		
2026	Dacoit: A Love Story	Prasad		
2026	Lenin	Parthasaradhi IPS		

=== Other language films ===
List of other language films and roles
Year	Title	Role	Language	Notes	Ref.
2006	Madrasi	Crowd member	Tamil	Uncredited role	
2007	Thiru Ranga	Sunil	Tamil		
2023	Maaveeran	Paramu	Tamil		
2023	Jailer	Blast Mohan	Tamil		
2023	Mark Antony	Ekambaram	Tamil		
2023	Japan	Sridhar	Tamil		
2024	Turbo	Auto Billa	Malayalam		
2024	Hrashwo Deergha	Sunil Varma	Nepali		
2024	Max	Ganesh	Kannada		
2025	Good Bad Ugly	Baby Tyson	Tamil		
2025	Indra	Abhimanyu	Tamil		
2025	Revolver Rita	Dracula Bobby	Tamil		
2026	Pookie	Vikas Vibes Swamiji	Tamil		
2026	Dacoit: A Love Story	Prasad	Hindi		
2026	Kattalan	Maari	Malayalam		
2026	Ananthan Kaadu	Sampath Rao	Malayalam; Tamil	Bilingual film	
2026	Jana Nayagan	Velu	Tamil		
2026	Mookuthi Amman 2	Rajasimman	Tamil		

== As a voice actor ==
Year	Title	Actor	Role	Notes
2012	Snehithudu	Sathyan	Silencer	Telugu dubbed version
2012	OKOK	Santhanam	Partha	Telugu dubbed version
2023	Changure Bangaru Raja	German Shepherd	Veerabobbili	

== Television ==
Year	Title	Role	Network	Notes
2017	Bigg Boss 2	Himself	Star Maa	Guest appearance
2025	AIR: All India Rankers	Varadhi	ETV Win	
