= Himaja =

Indian actress and model

- Born: Himaja Mallireddy; November 2, 1995 (age 30); Veerlapalem, Andhra Pradesh, India
- Education: MBA HR
- Occupation: Actress
- Years active: 2013–present
- Parent(s): Father expired in 2026 and Mother Lakshmi

Himaja Mallireddy is an Indian actress and model who works primarily in Telugu cinema. She is popularly known for her debut serial Konchem Istam Konchem Kastam and primarily known for her roles in movies Shatamanam Bhavati, Vunnadhi Okate Zindagi and Chitralahari. She participated as a contestant in Season 3 Best contestant of Bigg Boss.

== Early life and career ==
Himaja hails from Veerlapalem in Guntur district, Andhra Pradesh. She first acted in a tele-film "Sarvaantaryaami" which is about Sai Baba which was produced by her father Mallireddy Chandrasekhar Reddy and telecasted on MAA TV on the occasion of Guru Pournami. She worked as a model and TV host before she pursued a career in films. She worked as a TV host at Tollywood TV.

== Filmography ==
| Year | Title | Role | Notes |
|---|---|---|---|
| 2015 | Shivam | Risitha | |
| 2016 | Nenu Sailaja | Suchitra | |
| 2016 | Chuttalabbai | Himaja | |
| 2016 | Janatha Garage | | |
| 2016 | Dhruva | Ishika's friend | |
| 2017 | Mahanubhavudu | Meghana's friend | |
| 2017 | Shatamanam Bhavati | Subbalakshmi | |
| 2017 | Chandamama Raave | | |
| 2017 | Spyder | Renuka | Both in Telugu and Tamil |
| 2017 | Vunnadhi Okate Zindagi | Kanuka | |
| 2017 | Next Nuvve | Ghost | |
| 2018 | Jamba Lakidi Pamba | Divya | |
| 2018 | Rachayitha | Sheela | |
| 2019 | Vinaya Vidheya Rama | Ram's sister-in-law | |
| 2019 | Chitralahari | Navneetha | |
| 2019 | Aaviri | Kamala | |
| 2020 | Anukunnadi Okkati Ayyandhi Okati | Srujana | |
| 2021 | Kanabadutaledu | Sashi's sister-in-law | |
| 2021 | Varudu Kaavalenu | 'Selfie' Sarala | |
| 2022 | 10th Class Diaries | Nagalakshmi | |
| 2023 | Maya Petika | Mayor Malliswari | |
| 2024 | Dheera | Hamsalekha | |
| 2024 | Devara: Part 1 | Valli | |
| 2025 | Daaku Maharaaj | Krishnamurthy's daughter | |
| 2025 | Hari Hara Veera Mallu | Vishala | |

=== Television ===
| Year | Title | Role | Network | Notes |
|---|---|---|---|---|
| 2013 | Bharyamani | Apoorva | | |
| 2013 | Swayamvaram | | | |
| 2014-2016 | Konchem Istam Konchem Kastam | Revathi | Zee Telugu | |
| 2016 | 13 - Fear is Real | Episode 1 Contestant | Zee Telugu | |
| 2016 | Super 2 | Contestant | ETV | |
| 2016 | Kevvu Kabaddi | Contestant (Team Adhire Angels) | | |
| 2019 | Bigg Boss 3 | Contestant | Star Maa | |
