= My Dear Donga =

2024 film by B S Sarwagna Kumar

- Release poster
- Directed by: B. S. Sarwagna Kumar
- Written by: Shalini Kondepudi
- Produced by: Maheshwar Reddy Gojala
- Starring: Abhinav Gomatam; Shalini Kondepudi; Divya Sripada; Nikhil Gajula; Sashaank Manduri
- Cinematography: SS Manoj
- Edited by: Sai Murali
- Music by: Ajay Arasada
- Production company: CAM Entertainment
- Distributed by: Aha
- Release date: 19 April 2024
- Country: India
- Language: Telugu

My Dear Donga (transl. My dear thief) is a 2024 Indian Telugu-language comedy drama film directed by B. S. Sarwagna Kumar and written by Shalini Kondepudi. The film stars Abhinav Gomatam, Shalini Kondepudi, Divya Sripada, Nikhil Gajula, Vamsidhar Goud, Shashank Manduri and others.

The film premiered on 19 April 2024 on Aha, as a direct-to-video film.

== Plot ==
The story revolves around Suresh, a small-time thief who accidentally breaks into the flat of Sujatha. Instead of reporting him, Sujatha befriends him after witnessing his underlying kindness. The film follows their growing friendship and the subsequent events that occur in their lives, leading to unexpected twists and turns.

== Cast ==
- Abhinav Gomatam as Suresh, the thief
- Shalini Kondepudi as Sujatha, the flat owner
- Divya Sripada as Bujji, Sujatha's best friend
- Nikhil Gajula as Vishal, Sujatha's estranged boyfriend
- Vamsidhar Goud as Vamsi
- Shashank Manduri as Varun

== Production ==
In December 2023, Aha greenlit Aha original with Shalini Kondepudi as writer and the casting details were made public in January 2024 with Abhinav Gomatam as leading man alongside Shalini Kondepudi as Writer and female lead.

== Release and reception ==
My Dear Donga was released on 19 April 2024 on Aha.

The film received mixed reviews from critics, with notable praise for the performances and situational comedy, balanced by criticisms of the story's emotional depth and coherence. The film faced criticism for its lack of emotional depth and inconsistency in storytelling.
