= Divya Sripada =

Indian actress

- Born: Divya Drishti; 5 September 1996 (age 30); Vijayawada, Andhra Pradesh, India
- Occupation: Actress
- Years active: 2019–present

Divya Sripada (born 5 September 1996) is an Indian actress who works in Telugu films. She started her career with the YouTube channel Girl Formula by Chai Bisket. She is known for her work in Telugu films including Colour Photo, Middle Class Melodies.

== Career ==
Regarding her performance in Heads and Tales (2023), a critic wrote that "Divya Sripada steals the show in Heads & Tales, giving an outstanding performance as an innocent police constable who bears the brunt of her husband’s alcoholism". Another critic wrote that "Divya Sripada is the best of the lot. She as a vulnerable police constable is quite good. Her slang, body language, and dialogue delivery were impressive".

== Filmography ==
Year	Title	Role(s)	Notes	Ref.
2019	Dear Comrade	Anitha	Uncredited	
2020	Colour Photo	Padmaja	Credited as Divya Drishti	
2020	Miss India	Preethi		
2020	Middle Class Melodies	Gautami		
2021	Jathi Ratnalu	Journalist	Credited as Divya Drishti	
2021	Heads and Tales	P.C. Manga	Debut in a Lead role	
2021	WWW	Christy		
2021	Pushpa: The Rise	Srivalli's Friend		
2022	Good Luck Sakhi	Jyothi		
2022	F3: Fun and Frustration	Vishal Mitthal's daughter		
2022	Swathi Muthyam	Sailaja		
2022	Yashoda	Leela		
2022	Panchathantram	Devi	under segment The Kick	
2024	Sundaram Master	Myna	Lead role	
2024	My Dear Donga	Bujji		
