= Yevam =

2024 film by Prakash Dantuluri

- Theatrical release poster
- Directed by: Prakash Dantuluri
- Written by: Prakash Dantuluri
- Produced by: Navdeep; Pavan Goparaju
- Starring: Chandini Chowdary; Vasishta N. Simha; Jai Bharat Raj
- Cinematography: S. V. Vishweshwar
- Edited by: Srujana Adusumilli
- Music by: Score; Keertana Sesh; Songs; Keertana Sesh; Neelesh Mandalapu
- Production companies: CSpace; Prakash Dantuluri Productions
- Release date: 14 June 2024
- Country: India
- Language: Telugu

Yevam is a 2024 Indian Telugu-language psychological thriller film written and directed by Prakash Dantuluri. Produced by Navdeep and Pavan Goparaju through CSpace and Prakash Dantuluri Productions, the film features Chandini Chowdary, Vasishta N. Simha and Jai Bharat Raj in lead roles.

The film was theatrically released on 14 June 2024.

== Cast ==
- Chandini Chowdary as S.I K. Soumya
- Jai Bharat Raj as S.I C.H. Abhiram; an introvert and sincere cop; had a troubled past.
  - Vasishta N. Simha as Yugandhar, Abhi's alter ego
- Ashu Reddy as Harika Amaram, Abhi's wife
- Goparaju Ramana as a P.C M. Gangadhar
- Devi Prasad as Soumya's father
- Kalpa Latha as Soumya's mother
- Annie as Keerthi

== Production ==
The film was announced and started filming in late 2022. This is the second directorial film of Dantuluri, after the 2010 drama Om Shanti, which featured Navdeep as one of the leads. The film was shot extensively in the nearby areas of Hyderabad, including Vikarabad, where the story is set. Filming was completed in May 2023.

== Music ==
The film's soundtrack album is composed by Keertana Sesh and Neelesh Mandalapu, whereas background score is composed by Keertana Sesh.

Track list
No.	Title	Lyrics	Music	Singer(s)	Length
1.	"Rap Song"	AsurA	Neelesh Mandalapu	AsurA	3:00
2.	"Oggu Katha"	Midde Vineeth Goud	Neelesh Mandalapu	Midde Vineeth Goud and team	3:25

== Release and reception ==
Yevam was released on 14 June 2024. Telugucinema.com reported that the film performed poorly at the box office. Post-theatrical streaming rights were acquired by Aha and premiered on 25 July 2024.

Sangeetha Devi Dundoo of The Hindu opined that the film has an interesting premise but was letdown by "lacklustre writing". She further wrote that "Chandini Chowdary is the saving grace" of the film.
