= AIR: All India Rankers =

Indian Telugu-language webseries

- Genre: Coming-of-age; Comedy drama
- Created by: Joseph Clinton
- Written by: Joseph Clinton
- Directed by: Joseph Clinton
- Starring: Harsh Roshan; Bhanu Prakash; Jayateertha Molugu
- Music by: Score; Sinjith Yerramilli; Songs; Anivee
- Country of origin: India
- Original language: Telugu
- No. of seasons: 1
- No. of episodes: 7

Production
- Executive producer: Vara Kodali
- Producers: Sandeep Raj; Surya Vasupalli
- Cinematography: SS Manoj
- Editor: Srikanth Patnaik R
- Production companies: Pocket Money Pictures; VGK Creations

Original release
- Network: ETV Win
- Release: 3 July 2025

AIR: All India Rankers is an Indian Telugu-language coming-of-age comedy drama television series created, written and directed by Joseph Clinton. The series stars Harsh Roshan, Bhanu Prakash and Jayateertha Molugu in the lead roles.

The series premiered on 3 July 2025 on ETV Win.

== Cast ==
- Harsh Roshan as Dasari Arjun Prasad
- Bhanu Prakash as Devineni Raj Kumar "Raju"
- Jayateertha Molugu as Imran
- Sunil as Varadhi, Chairman of AIR College
- Chaitanya Rao Madadi as Surya
- Harsha Chemudu as BVS
- Jeevan Kumar Naidu as Jeevan, Incharge
- Sandeep Raj as Correspondent
- Sameer as Dasari Srinivas, Arjun's father
- Ramana Bhargava as Raju's father
- Chandini Raj as Imran’s school teacher
- Bindu Chandramouli as Swarna, Raju's mother
- Laxmi Kiran as Imran's father
- Ramesh Konambhotla as Principal M. Vinay
- Akshara Nalla as Jayasri
- Allu Geetha Reddy as Lucky
- Keerthy Mani Kumar as Kranthi
- Vara Kodali
- Mounika Reddy as Saraswati (cameo appearance)

== Episodes ==
No.	Title	Directed by	Written by	Original release date
1	"Integration"	Joseph Clinton	Joseph Clinton	3 July 2025
2	"Resistance"	Joseph Clinton	Joseph Clinton	3 July 2025
3	"Radioactive"	Joseph Clinton	Joseph Clinton	3 July 2025
4	"Fusion"	Joseph Clinton	Joseph Clinton	6 July 2025
5	"Irreversible"	Joseph Clinton	Joseph Clinton	3 July 2025
6	"The Catalyst"	Joseph Clinton	Joseph Clinton	3 July 2025
7	"Equilibrium"	Joseph Clinton	Joseph Clinton	3 July 2025

== Reception ==
Tirumala AN of Asianet News Telugu was highly positive towards the performance of the lead cast. 123Telugu rated it 3 out of 5 and wrote, "AIR (All India Rankers) is a decent and watchable series. The first three episodes are engaging, the next two slow down a bit, and the final two bring it to an emotional and satisfying close". BH Harsh of Cinema Express rated it 2.5 out of 5 and said that the writing lacks depth, further writing, "Joseph Clinton forgets to build on the core tenets of his premise", while appreciating the performances of the lead cast.
