= Gaami =

2024 film by Vidyadhar Kagita

- Theatrical release poster
- Directed by: Vidyadhar Kagita
- Screenplay by: Vidyadhar Kagita; Pratyush Vatyam
- Produced by: Karthik Sabareesh; Swetha Moravaneni (co-producer)
- Starring: Vishwak Sen; Chandini Chowdary; Abhinaya; Harika Pedada; Dayanand Reddy; Mohammad Samad
- Cinematography: Vishwanath Reddy Chelumalla
- Edited by: Raghavendra Thirun
- Music by: Songs: Sweekar Agasthi; Naresh Kumaran; Score: Naresh Kumaran
- Production companies: Karthik Kult Kreations; V Celluloid; VR Global Media; Swetha Vahini Studios Ltd; Clown Pictures
- Release date: 8 March 2024
- Running time: 144 minutes
- Country: India
- Language: Telugu
- Budget: ₹6 crore
- Box office: ₹22 crore

Gaami (transl. Seeker) is a 2024 Indian Telugu-language epic adventure thriller film written and directed by debutant Vidyadhar Kagita. The film features Vishwak Sen, Chandini Chowdary, Abhinaya, Harika Pedada and Mohammad Samad in primary roles. Initially started with a crowd-funding campaign, it was produced by Karthik Sabareesh, under Karthik Kult.

It released on 8 March 2024 to positive reviews from critics and audiences, with critics praising the cast's performances, concept, production design and technical aspects.The film was a major commercial success at the box-office by grossing over ₹22 crore against the budget of ₹6 crore. Gaami has been screened at International Film Festival Rotterdam, becoming the first Telugu film to do so.

== Plot ==
Shankar, an amnesiac Aghora suffering from haphephobia, is banished from his Ashram after the other Aghoras mistake his condition for a curse from Lord Shiva. Guided by Sudama, an empathetic ashramite, Shankar travels to Prayagraj in search of Kedar Baba, the Aghora who once brought him to the Ashram. There, Kedar Baba's disciple informs him that he has died, but reveals the existence of Maalipatram, a bioluminescent mushroom hidden in the Himalayas that can cure his condition if consumed within a specific 15-day period occurring once every 36 years. Jahnavi, a doctor researching the mushroom's medicinal potential, joins Shankar on the journey.

Elsewhere, Durga, a terminally ill Devadasi in a South Indian village, wishes to reconcile with her estranged daughter Uma, who resents her for abandoning her during childhood. Uma eventually learns that Durga became a Devadasi to ensure her safe birth during a difficult pregnancy, and the two reconcile. After Durga's death, however, the village chieftain forces Uma to succeed her mother as the village Devadasi.

Parallelly, in an illegal medical facility known as C.A.T, a captive identified as CT-333 undergoes brutal conversion therapy under Dr. Bakshi and his assistant Tara. CT-333 attempts to escape with the help of another inmate, but the plan fails. Later, during an electrocution procedure, the system malfunctions, leaving him severely traumatized.

As Shankar journeys through the Himalayas, he experiences recurring visions of CT-333 and Uma seeking help. After surviving several hardships, including a fall from a cliff, he is rescued by a Buddhist monk, who tells him that his fate is karmically tied to the two strangers and that Jahnavi might not have survived the fall. Meanwhile, Uma is sold to agents connected to C.A.T after it is discovered that she is intersex, having Congenital adrenal hyperplasia. The facility subjects her to experiments intended to suppress her male characteristics through repeated electroshock procedures. Uma eventually grows up into CT-333, who later escapes the facility but loses his memory and develops haphophobia after a final botched procedure.

Kedar Baba rescues CT-333 during his escape and it is revealed that Uma, CT-333, and Shankar are all the same person at different stages of life. Recovering his memories, Shankar is devastated and briefly considers suicide, but recalls Durga's encouragement and continues his search for the Maalipatram. He finally discovers the mushroom in a Himalayan cave and consumes it within the required time.

After falling from a cliff during a struggle with a lion, Shankar awakens near a lake and reunites with Jahnavi, who survived their earlier accident. When he is finally able to touch her without fear, he realizes that he has been cured of his haphophobia. The film ends with Shankar embracing Jahnavi, intercut with memories of Uma embracing Durga.

== Cast ==
- Vishwak Sen as Shankar
- Mohammad Samad as CT-333
- Harika Pedada as Uma, Durga's daughter
- Chandini Chowdary as Dr. Jahnavi
- Abhinaya as Durga
- Dayanand Reddy
- Shanti Rao as Tara
- Mayank Parakh as Dr. Bakshi
- Viswanath Mandalika as Dr. Narendra
- Sridhar as Basava
- John Kottoly as Sudhama
- Sharath Kumar as The Ayurvedic Guru
- Rajnish Sharma as The Monk
- Aumkar Katamaraju as Ravi
- Venkat
- Unnikrishnan
- Rajiv Kumar Aneja as Colonel

== Production ==
=== Development ===
Vidyadhar Kagita initiated a crowdfunding campaign for the film, via Facebook, in July 2018. In a corresponding YouTube video, Kagita appealed to the public for financial support, emphasizing the project's independent nature and spirit. The campaign received significant backing from both the audience and industry insiders, enabling the commencement of principal photography in September 2018 in rural areas around Nellore, Andhra Pradesh. The film was shot in various locations including the Himalayas and Varanasi.

=== Pre-production ===
The diverse locations required for filming posed logistical challenges, ranging from humid South Indian villages to freezing Himalayan terrains. Extensive location scouting took place in regions such as Khtaling, Pyangong, Khardung La, Zanskar, and Leh during the winters of 2017 and 2018. The title logo was designed for universal appeal, and character concept arts were prepared to define the characters' nature and style.

Script development began in May 2016, with the first draft completed by September 2017. Inspiration from extensive location scouting in the Himalayas influenced subsequent drafts, leading to the shooting script's finalization by April 2018. Schedule-wise rewrites continued throughout production, with additional refinement during the COVID-19 lockdown.

Key cast members, including Vishwak Sen and Chandini Chowdary were approached based on their previous performances. Scene tests, table reads, and rehearsals preceded filming. Notable additions to the cast, such as Mohammad Samad and Shanti Rao, were made during subsequent stages of production.

=== Principal photography ===
The art department, led by Vidyadhar Kagita, oversaw production design for the initial schedules. Subsequently, Pravalya Duddupudi joined as production designer, overseeing the construction of 12 sets, including chroma key setups, at a warehouse studio. Special properties reflecting mythical and retro-futuristic themes were custom-made for the film.

It was filmed over approximately 130 days, deviating from mainstream production norms. The minimalist crew utilized guerrilla filmmaking techniques, shooting in rural villages around Nellore and specially erected sets in Hyderabad. The film was shot at locations including the holy Ghats of Allahabad, Varanasi, Leh, and Kardhung La pass. Despite interruptions from the 2019 India-Pakistan border skirmishes and the COVID-19 pandemic, principal photography concluded on November 6, 2020.

=== Post-production ===
Editing commenced during the first COVID-19 lockdown, with the first cut completed by November 2022. Sync Cinemas handled sound production, while Sunil Chinta served as the VFX supervisor, overseeing nearly 700 visual effects shots. Motion capture tests were conducted in May 2018, with environmental effects achieved in-camera through innovative DIY practical systems. In an interview Vidyadhar Kagita spoke about the idea behind Gaami "was to do something radical yet small enough so that it makes its money back even if fewer people watch it.” He adds, “Gaami should not be confused for a big film. After making Gaami, I strongly believe that we can do stuff like this even with less money. In the Telugu film industry, there is much discourse about what we can or cannot do. It is important that we change that and create space for new stories.”

== Music ==
Gaami

Film score by Naresh Kumaran
- Released: 2024
- Genre: Feature film soundtrack
- Language: Telugu
- Label: Aditya Music
- Producer: Naresh Kumaran

Naresh Kumaran chronology
| IIT Krishnamurthy (2020) | Gaami (2024) |

The background score of the film is credited to Narsh Kumaran, while the songs were composed by Naresh Kumaran and Sweekar Agasthi. The soundtrack features three songs, where the first single, "Gamyaanne" composed by Sweekar Agasthi, released on February 24, 2024, while the second single, "Shivam" composed by Naresh Kumaran, released on 4 March 2024.

| No. | Title | Lyrics | Singer(s) | Length |
|---|---|---|---|---|
| 1. | "Gamyaanne" | Sanapati Bharadwaj Patrudu | Anurag Kulkarni, Sweekar Agasthi, Sugunamma | 4:22 |
| 2. | "Shivam" | Srimani | Shankar Mahadevan | 4:00 |
| 3. | "Aariraaro" | Lakshmi Priyanka | Harini Ivaturi | 1:22 |

== Release ==
On 8 February 2024, it was announced that the film would be released worldwide on 8 March 2024 due to Vishwak's other film Gangs of Godavari being postponed. The film released on streaming platform ZEE5 on 12 April 2024.

== Box office ==
Despite the clash with Gopichand starrer Bhimaa, Gaami saw Vishwak Sen's career's highest opening day with 9.07 crore and continued to grow with positive word of mouth. In United States premieres it collected over $160,000, the film initially faced challenges in securing optimal showtimes and screens in Cinemark Theatres due to the dominance of Hollywood releases like Dune: Part Two and Kung Fu Panda 4 and achieved a significant milestone by grossing US$500,000 and emerged as Vishwak Sen's career's highest grosser in the international markets. The film collected over ₹22 crore in its theatrical run.

== Reception ==
Sangeetha Devi Dundoo of The Hindu cited the film as "an immersive soul-searching journey", while praising Vidhyadhar's work along with Viswhak Sen's performance and the cinematography. Echoing the same, Neeshita Nyayapati of Hindustan Times also praised Vidhyadhar's work with a special mention to the score and cinematography. The Times of India stated that, "Gaami is a film that, despite its length and narrative complexities, offers a visually stunning experience with strong performances and an innovative storyline". Writing for The New Indian Express, Abhilasha Cherukuri opined that the film gets its story treatment right, with respect to how the conflicts escalate progressively.

Praising the performances of lead actors (including Harika Pedada and Mohammad Samad), Jahnavi of The News Minute further wrote that "Vidyadhar shows some great genre-bending writing and direction in his very first film, bringing in an unconventional voice particularly for Telugu cinema". Pinkvilla praised the technical values of the film, in addition to the performances of Sen, Chowdary, Pedada and Samad.
