= Second Hand (2013 film) =

2013 Telugu-language film directed by Kishore Tirumala

- Film poster
- Directed by: Kishore Tirumala
- Produced by: Poorna Naidu; B. V. S. Ravi
- Starring: Dhanya Balakrishna; Sudheer Varma; Kireeti Damaraju; Sree Vishnu; Anuj Ram
- Cinematography: Avaneendra; Uma Shankar
- Edited by: M. S. Rajashekhar Reddy (S. R. Shekhar)
- Music by: Ravichandra
- Production company: Sreeyas Chitra
- Release date: 13 December 2013
- Country: India
- Language: Telugu

Second Hand is a 2013 Indian Telugu-language romantic drama starring Dhanya Balakrishna, Sudheer Varma, Kireeti Damaraju, Sree Vishnu and Anuj Ram. This film marks the debut of writer B. V. S. Ravi as a co-producer and Telugu debut of director Kishore Tirumala. Avaneedra, who previously worked for the Hindi film Bhoot Returns (2012), and Uma Shankar were cinematographers for the film.

== Plot ==
Santhosh (Sudheer Varma) and Subba Rao (Kireeti Damaraju) accidentally meet and discuss their love lives. Santhosh is a struggling photographer who decided to commit suicide to take revenge on his ex-girlfriend. Meanwhile, Subba Rao arrives at his home while looking for his Facebook friend's address. After learning it is the wrong address, Santhosh asks to record his final confession on his phone. Then Santhosh narrates Subba Rao his story.

Santhosh talks about his girlfriend, Deepu (Dhanya Balakrishna in Subba Rao's visualization), a jovial girl. Through some comical circumstances they fall in love. Later Deepu's parents finalise a matrimonial match for her with Mounish who is settled in Delhi. Deepu starts comparing Mounish with Santhosh which makes life hell for him. But she assures him that she will be marry only him. His friends try to make him understand that Deepu is in the process of breaking up with him. One day finally Deepu breaks up with Santhosh for a silly reason though Santhosh apologises to her. This makes him depressed and he tries to contact her in other ways to no avail. After some days he learns that Deepu had married Mounish and he goes to meet her. In the conversation Santhosh understands that Deepu, despite being in a relationship with him, started talking with Mounish. Santhosh decided to commit suicide and he wants his final confession to cause a sensation in India and punish her for the rest of her life.

After hearing this Subba Rao and tells him that his own story is worse than Santhosh's. Subba Rao narrates about his wife, Swecha (again played by Dhanya Balakrishna this time in Santhosh's visualisation). Dr. Subba Rao, a wealthy dentist from Vijayawada is orthodox and wants to marry a virgin. That is why he did date or get into a pre-marital relationship and his friends call him 'Gentleman'. His wedding is fixed with Swecha and she confesses her past (sexual) relationship with Shravanth and that their respective families did not accept their relationship due to some political reasons. Swecha has moved on and Subba Rao likes her genuine nature and decides to marry her. Later Shravanth became possessive and tries to convince Swecha to call off the wedding but she asks him to accept their break up which makes Subba Rao doubt her character. After marriage Swecha asks Subba Rao to wait to consummate their marriage. This annoys Subba Rao but being an introvert, he decides to quietly wait for her. Swecha continues to meet Shravanth regularly which makes Subba Rao angry and helpless.

After hearing Subba Rao's past Santhosh feels sorry for him and decided to not commit suicide. Both of them meet Sahasra (Dhanya Balakrishna) and are confused and each had imagined in their visualisation. They quarrel with each other during which Santhosh gets dehydrated. Subba Rao and Sahasra admit him to a hospital. The trio meets a Doctor (Posani Krishna Murali) and after hearing their quarrel decided to give an advice in their problems.

Sahasra 'Saha' is stuck between two men: her ex-boyfriend, Chaitanya (Sree Vishnu) 'Chaitu' from Vizag and his best friend Siddu. Siddu and Saha are close friends and stay together. On Siddu's insistence Saha, she agrees for Chaitu to be their roommate. In the beginning Saha feels irritated with Chaitu's easy-going nature but Siddu tells her that she misunderstands about him. Later we come across Saravanan (Kishore Tirumala), who has been proposing to her since 2 years, gets bashed up by Chaitu. Saha eventually falls for him and proposes to him with the support of Siddu. Soon Chaitu and Saha consummate their relationship which results in Saha's pregnancy and suddenly Chaitu disappears from their life. With no option left she informs Siddu who helps her in geeting an abortion at a clinic. Later Chaitu turns up and Saha breaks up with him while Siddu thrashed him for his betrayal to love and friendship. Saha becomes depressed from the events then Siddu offers his support by proposing to marry her which she eventually accepts. Chaitu then explains to Saha his situation for not turning up and proposes to marry her. Observing his sincerity Saha is confused about whom to marry.

The doctor conforms that their issues are with them and not to be blamed on others. He conforms that Santhosh was incompetent enough to provide for Deepu and so she was practical and moved on and advised that he needs to focus on his career. The Doctor then says that Subba Rao's problem is with skepticism; that though he trusts Swecha is loyal to Subba Rao he must understand that he needs to give her some time, spend some time with her and show love so that she may forget her past soon. The Doctor then tells Saha that she does not have any clarity on her choices because she is expecting 100% love but she actually cannot give 100% love to either of them; it is foolishness to expect so much from others which you cannot provide to others. The Doctor takes leave from them and discharges Santhosh.

The film ends with the matured trio parting ways with solutions to their respective issues. Santhosh decides to focus on his career, Subba Rao decides to be affectionate with his wife and Saha realises that no man is perfect and she had taken a decision which is not revealed in the climax.

== Cast ==
- Dhanya Balakrishna in three roles as:
  - Sahasra aka 'Saha', a woman who is struggling who to choose between two men
  - Deepu, Santhosh's former girlfriend
  - Swecha, Subba Rao's wife who asks for time after marriage
- Sudheer Varma as Santosh, a photographer
- Kireeti Damaraju as Dr. Subba Rao
- Sree Vishnu as Chaitanya 'Chaitu', a carefree youngster who is Sahasra's ex-boyfriend
- Anuj Ram as Siddu, Chaitu's best friend
- Posani Krishna Murali as Doctor (Cameo role)
- Kishore Tirumala as Saravanan, who is in love with Sahasra

== Soundtrack ==
The music was composed by Ravichandra. The lyrics were written by Kishore Tirumala, Sagar and Krishna Kanth.

No.	Title	Singer(s)	Length
1.	"Breaking News Konjam"	Revanth, B. Aditya, Sweekar Agasthi	3:50
2.	"Jo Tera Hi Ho Mera Hai"	Sweekar Agasthi, Jyotsna, Dhanya Balakrishna	4:00
3.	"Love Ra Love Ra"	Kishore Tirumala, Ravichandra, Avaneendra	4:25
4.	"Govinda Govinda"	Avaneendra	1:32
5.	"Subbarao"	Avaneendra, B. Adithya	4:13
6.	"Love Ra Love Ra (Bar Mix)"	Ravichandra, Avaneendra	3:21
7.	"Jagaana Prema Inthena"	Ravichandra	1:56
Total length:			23:17

== Release ==
The Times of India gave the film two-and-a-half out of five stars and wrote, "The cinematography and editing is a bit amateur, however, it’s an interesting movie to watch". Sangeetha Devi Dundoo of The Hindu wrote, "If you can sit back and laugh at Mars-Venus tug of wars as well as confused relationships and not get judgemental about the characters, the film makes for a fun watch".
