= Kishore Tirumala =

Indian film director

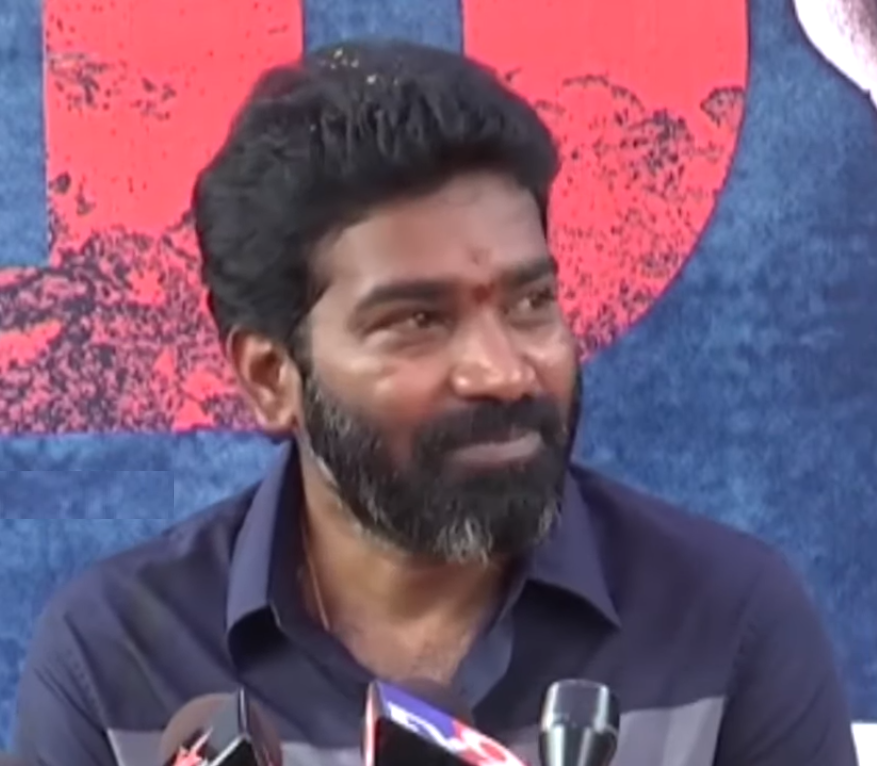
- Kishore Tirumala in 2019
- Born: Tirupati, Andhra Pradesh, India
- Other name: Thirumalai Kishore
- Occupations: Film director; screenwriter
- Years active: 2008–present

Kishore Tirumala is an Indian film director and screenwriter who works in Telugu cinema. Tirumala's notable films include Nenu Sailaja (2016), Vunnadhi Okate Zindagi (2017) and Chitralahari (2019).

== Filmography ==
Key
†	Denotes films that have not yet been released

=== As a film director ===
Year	Title	Notes	Ref.
2011	Pillaiyar Theru Kadaisi Veedu	Tamil film; credited as Thirumalai Kishore	
2013	Second Hand	Also actor, singer, and lyricist	
2016	Nenu Sailaja		
2017	Vunnadhi Okate Zindagi		
2019	Chitralahari		
2021	Red		
2022	Aadavallu Meeku Johaarlu		
2026	Bhartha Mahasayulaku Wignyapthi		

=== As a writer ===
Year	Title	Writer	Notes	Ref.
2008	Nenu Meeku Telusa?	Dialogue	Also lyricist	
2013	Thulli Vilayadu	Screenplay, dialogue	Tamil film; credited as Thirumalai Kishore	
2014	Power	Dialogue	Additional dialogue only	
2014	Current Theega	Dialogue		
2015	Raghuvaran B.Tech	Dialogue	Dubbed version of Velaiilla Pattadhari	
2015	Shivam	Dialogue		

=== As an actor ===
Year	Title	Role
2013	Second Hand	Saravanan
2025	Mirai	CI Ashok

== Awards and nominations ==
Year	Award	Category	Work	Result	Ref.
2015	Nandi Awards	Best Screenplay Writer	Nenu Sailaja	Won	
