= Manasutho =

- Directed by: A. S. Ravi Kumar Chowdary
- Produced by: Venigalla Ananda Prasad, Datrika Vittal Rao
- Starring: Akash, Arzoo Govitrikar
- Edited by: Kola Bhaskar
- Music by: Ashirvad Luke
- Release date: 17 May 2002
- Country: India
- Language: Telugu

Manasutho is a 2002 Indian Telugu-language romantic film directed by A. S. Ravi Kumar Chowdary and produced by Venigalla Ananda Prasad. It music and background score were by Ashirwad. The film stars Akash, Arzoo Govitrikar. The film was a box office failure.

== Plot ==
Manasutho is romantic drama concerning the relationship between Kanshik and Sapna.

== Cast ==
- Akash as Kanishk
- Arzoo Govitrikar as Sapna
- Brahmanandam as Lecturer
- Sudha as Kanishk's mother
- AVS as Kanishk's father
- M. S. Narayana as Train Ticket Collector
- Sudeepa Pinky as Kanishk's sister
- Khayyum as Kanishk's friend
- Sudhakar Komakula

== Production ==
Ambika Krishna paid an advance to A. S. Ravi Kumar Chowdary and forgot about it after the film flopped. She later worked as the producer for Veerabhadra (2005).

== Soundtrack ==
The soundtrack was composed by Ashirvad Luke.

Track listing
No.	Title	Lyrics	Singer(s)	Length
1.	"Chinni Manase"	Kulasekhar	Alka Yagnik	3:01
2.	"Godharilaga"	Kulasekhar	Sandeep Bhaumik, Malavika	4:39
3.	"Sikakulam Pilla"	Kulasekhar	Sukhwinder Singh, Sadhana Sargam	4:40
4.	"Mansutho"	Sirivennela Seetharama Sastry	Alka Yagnik, Hariharan	4:00
5.	"Yeppudu Chappudu"	Suddala Ashok Teja	Shankar Mahadevan	4:40
6.	"Class Roomlo"	Kulasekhar	Nissi John, Triveni	4:42
7.	"Premisthe Okate Vanaja"	A. S. Ravi Kumar Chowdary	S. Janaki	3:08
8.	"Mabbula Pallaki"	Kulasekhar	John Sudhakar, Gorinka Hathangadi	4:12
Total length:				33:02

== Box office ==
The film was a box office failure since it was about the Rayalaseema faction, which was covered in many films.
