= Music Shop Murthy =

2024 Indian film by Siva Paladugu

- Theatrical release poster
- Directed by: Siva Paladugu
- Written by: Siva Paladugu
- Produced by: Harsha Garapati; Ranga Rao Garapati
- Starring: Ajay Ghosh; Chandini Chowdary
- Cinematography: Sreenivas Bejugam
- Edited by: Bonthala Nageswara Reddy
- Music by: Pavan
- Production company: Fly High Cinemas
- Release date: 14 June 2024
- Running time: 127 minutes
- Country: India
- Language: Telugu

Music Shop Murthy is a 2024 Indian Telugu-language comedy drama film written and directed by Siva Paladugu and produced through Fly High Cinemas. The film features Ajay Ghosh and Chandini Chowdary in primary roles and was released on 14 June 2024.

== Plot ==
This story begins in early 2010's at Vinukonda, Andhra Pradesh. Murthy is a 52 year old middle class man who runs a music shop in his hometown that runs in losses. He is a kind-hearted man who rents music cassettes and plays music recordings in the local small functions. But the locals couldn't pay the amount on time to him, which makes him difficult for him to run the business every month, which makes huge losses. His taunting wife Jaya pressures him to sell his music shop and want to start a cell phone business

== Cast ==
- Ajay Ghosh as "Music Shop" Murthy aka DJ Murthy
- Chandini Chowdary as DJ Anjana
- Aamani as Jaya Sri 'Jaya', Murthy's wife
- Bhanu Chander as Ramakrishna; Anjana's father
- Amit Sharma as DJ Devil (D)
- Dayanandh Reddy as James
- Chatrapathi Sekhar
- ETV Prabhakar
- Ambati Srinivas
- Muralidhar Goud
- Ujith Dev as Sharath

== Music ==
The film's soundtrack album and background score were composed by Pavan. "Angrezi Beat" was released as second single on 16 May 2024.

All music is composed by Pavan.

Track list
No.	Title	Lyrics	Singer(s)	Length
1.	"Arere Kaalam"	Mahesh Poloju	Haricharan	3:43
2.	"Antarantha Murthy"	Mahesh Poloju	Kaala Bhairava	4:08
3.	"Anukunnavi Jarigena"	Mahesh Poloju	N. C. Karunya	4:02
4.	"Vadiley Vadiley"	Mahesh Poloj, Pavan	Yazin Nizar	4:23
5.	"Angrezi Beat"	Pavan	Rahul Sipligunj	4:23
6.	"Chinni Chinni"	Mahesh Poloju	Sooraj Santhosh	4:02

== Release ==
Music Shop Murthy was initially scheduled to release on 31 May 2024 but was postponed and released on 14 June 2024 in movie theaters. Post-theatrical digital streaming rights were acquired by Amazon Prime Video and ETV Win. It premiered on Prime Video and Win on 16 July 2024.

== Reception ==
With a rating of 3.25 out of 5, Suhas Sistu of The Hans India particularly praised the performance of Ajay Ghosh and cited the film as "heartfelt drama", "must-watch" and "well-crafted". BH Harsh of Cinema Express rated the film 3 out of 5 and praised the performances of Chowdary and Ghosh while stating "It's hard to be sceptical about a film that’s so inherently sweet and cheerful, despite carrying its share of familiar tropes". Echoing the same, The Times of India too gave the same rating while giving a positive response and stated "Music Shop Murthy stands out as a poignant tale of resilience and passion. Its unconventional storyline, combined with stellar performances and strong technical execution, makes it an enjoyable watch".
