= Daaku Maharaaj =

2025 Indian film by Bobby Kolli

- Theatrical release poster
- Directed by: Bobby Kolli
- Written by: Bobby Kolli
- Dialogues by: Nandu Savirigana; Bhanu Bogavarapu
- Screenplay by: K. Chakravarthy Reddy; Bobby Kolli
- Story by: Bobby Kolli
- Produced by: Suryadevara Naga Vamsi; Sai Sowjanya
- Starring: Nandamuri Balakrishna; Bobby Deol; Shraddha Srinath; Pragya Jaiswal; Ravi Kishan
- Cinematography: Vijay Kartik Kannan
- Edited by: Ruben; Niranjan Devaramane
- Music by: Thaman S
- Production companies: Sithara Entertainments; Fortune Four Cinemas; Srikara Studios
- Distributed by: see below
- Release date: 12 January 2025
- Running time: 148 minutes
- Country: India
- Language: Telugu

Daaku Maharaaj (transl. King of the Bandits) is a 2025 Indian Telugu-language action film directed and co-written by Bobby Kolli and produced by Sithara Entertainments, Fortune Four Cinemas and Srikara Studios. The film stars Nandamuri Balakrishna alongside Bobby Deol (in his Telugu debut), Pragya Jaiswal, Shraddha Srinath, Sachin Khedekar, Makarand Deshpande, Urvashi Rautela, Aadukalam Naren, Nithin Mehta, Ravi Kishan, VTV Ganesh, Rishi, and Chandini Chowdary. The film follows the journey of Sitaram, a dedicated civil engineer who transforms into the dacoit named "Daaku Maharaaj" to protect a village in distress from Prince Balwanth Singh Thakur. Later, he disguises himself as a driver named Nanaji to safeguard a young girl, Vaishnavi, and her family.

The film was officially announced in June 2023 under the tentative title NBK 109, as it is Balakrishna's 109th film as a leading actor, and the official title was announced in November 2024. Principal photography commenced in November 2023. The music was composed by Thaman S, while the cinematography was handled by Vijay Kartik Kannan and the editing by Ruben and Niranjan Devaramane.

Daaku Maharaaj was released worldwide on 12 January 2025, coinciding with Sankranti.

== Plot ==
Krishnamurthy, a wealthy philanthropist, lives a peaceful life with his orphaned granddaughter, Vaishnavi, in Madanapalle, Chittoor district. Krishnamurthy reports illicit wildlife trade on his leased-out tea estate, administered by MLA Trimurthulu Naidu's younger brother, Manohar Naidu. Manohar escapes custody and the estate gets seized; Trimurthulu intimidates Krishnamurthy and his family to retreat, but he refuses to budge and enlists police protection. Govind Gujjar, a dacoit pretending to be a servant of Krishnamurthy, notifies their notorious leader Sitaram alias Daaku Maharaaj, who is imprisoned in a prison in Bhopal, of the family's hardship. Maharaaj flees from prison with the aid of his henchmen and joins the family as their new driver under the alias Nanaji to protect Vaishnavi and builds a good rapport with her. Maharaaj further threatens Manohar and compels him into surrendering to the police.

Inspector Stephen Raj, a feared encounter specialist, traces Maharaaj and takes him away without exposing him to the family. Meanwhile, Trimurthulu and Manohar are revealed to have been cultivating high-quality cocaine on the tea estate for Bablu Singh Thakur and his uncle, Prince Balwant Singh Thakur of the Thakur royal family. Bablu visits Krishnamurthy and puts him in the picture regarding the cocaine cultivation and asks him to withdraw his complaint so that he can export the yield and offers him a partnership; Krishnamurthy bluntly rejects it, prompting Bablu to launch an attack on his residence that night and simultaneously dispatch his men into the estate to harvest the crop. He also cuts Trimurthulu's throat after he questions Bablu's methods in speaking with Krishnamurthy about the lease. Though SI Janaki and Govind try to ward off the assassins from the family, the situation starts to get out of hand. Maharaaj's men hold the SP and his family at gunpoint, forcing him to free Maharaaj. Maharaaj comes to the family's rescue and resists Bablu's men in the estate and beheads Bablu, but is severely wounded and admitted to a hospital. Govind tells Krishnamurthy and his family about Maharaaj's past.

Past: Govind and the other dacoits are peasants from a water-scarce settlement called Bajrangpur in the Chambal division. Balwant Singh Thakur and his elder brothers use their royal power, exploit the villagers' misery and force them to work in their marble quarries under harsh conditions in exchange for a weekly water supply to their villages. The villagers approach IES officers Sitaram and his wife, Kaveri, for a solution; they figure out that a dam could be built to irrigate their fields, but the Thakur brothers' illegitimate mines pose a hindrance to the project. Sitaram and Kaveri approach Nandini, the DC, to propose the construction of the dam and shut off the mines. However, Nandini is revealed to be Balwant's wife and Balwant learns about Sitaram's proposition. He calls Sitaram to the Thakur palace and offers a bribe to Sitaram, but when the latter declines, he massacres the entire village, including the children, to teach him a lesson. An enraged Sitaram goes on a killing spree and pounces on the Thakurs' residence only to find that Balwant and his eldest brother, Raja Prithviraj Singh Thakur, are absent. Sitaram ruthlessly murders Balwant's second brother, Prince Yashwanth Singh Thakur, impaling him on the water fountain and informs Nandini about her husband's atrocities. Sitaram transforms into the villagers' revered leader, abandoning his job as an engineer, and is proclaimed as Daaku Maharaaj. With aid from across the country in the form of weapons, Maharaaj and his henchmen halt operations in the quarry. Prithviraj abducts Kaveri and a few villagers to find Maharaaj's location, but Maharaaj shows up and kills him. While Bablu and his men search for the pregnant Kaveri on a festival night at a temple, Nandini rescues her from getting caught and speaks to her about Balwant and Minister Udham Singh's secret narcotics trade in the name of marble mining. Nandini says that she treats Sitaram as her elder brother. Nandini reveals that she was the one who got Sitaram and Kaveri transferred to Chambal, trusting that they would be of use to its suffering inhabitants. With the information given by Nandini, Maharaaj abducts Udham Singh and forces him to confess about their illicit trade. While Maharaaj is about to approach the authorities with the evidence, Balwant learns about Nandini's deceit and intimidates Maharaaj into rescuing Nandini. Before Maharaaj can arrive, Balwant tortures Nandini and injures their daughter, Vaishnavi. Maharaaj arrives and fights Balwant, but the latter and Bablu flee as a mob of villagers attack their palace. With the evidence and Nandini's report, Maharaaj exposes Balwant's trade to the government, leading to the closure of the mines and the approval of the proposed dam in the region. However, Nandini dies from her wounds and asks Maharaaj to entrust Vaishnavi to her estranged parents.

Present: Vaishnavi is revealed to be Nandini's daughter and a devastated Krishnamurthy regrets alienating Nandini after she married Balwant against his wishes. Balwant arrives at the hospital looking for Maharaaj, killing everyone who comes in his way. The family tries to safeguard an unconscious Maharaaj, while Stephen, a recuperating Trimurthulu, and Maharaaj's henchmen try to prevent Balwant and his men from harming him and Vaishnavi. However, Maharaaj regains consciousness, rescues Vaishnavi and kills Balwant. Years later, Maharaaj is released from prison and reunites with Kaveri and his son. He inaugurates the dam that has been constructed in Nandini's name.

== Cast ==
- Nandamuri Balakrishna as Chief Engineer Sitaram IES / Daaku Maharaaj / Nanaji
- Bobby Deol as Balwant Singh Thakur (voice dubbed by P. Ravi Shankar)
- Shraddha Srinath as Princess Nandini Thakur IAS, Collector of Chambal District, Balwant Singh Thakur's wife; Krishnamurthy’s elder daughter; Vaishnavi's mother
- Pragya Jaiswal as Deputy Engineer Kaveri IES, Sitaram's wife
- Sachin Khedekar as Krishnamurthy, Vaishnavi's grandfather, Nandini and Shivani’s father
- Makarand Deshpande as Govind Gujjar, Maharaaj's henchman
- Urvashi Rautela as SI Janaki
- Aadukalam Naren as Minister Inder Singh
- Nithin Mehta as Raja Prithviraj Singh Thakur, Balwanth Singh Thakur's first elder brother
- Ravi Kishan as Trimurthulu Naidu MLA (voice dubbed by P. Ravi Shankar)
- VTV Ganesh as SP Panthulu
- Rishi as Prince Bablu Singh Thakur, Balwant Singh’s nephew; Prithviraj Singh Thakur's son
- Chandini Chowdary as Shivani, Nandini's younger sister and Krishnamurthy’s younger daughter
- Satya as Constable Babji
- Deepraj Rana as Prince Yashwanth Singh Thakur, Balwant Singh Thakur's second elder brother
- Harsha Vardhan as Abbavaram, Krishnamurthy’s son-in-law
- Venkatarao Vuppuluri
- Lakshmi
- NeethuHindi
- Mayuka
- Gemini Suresh
- Nanda Gopal
- Praveena as Krishnamurthy’s wife and Vaishnavi’s grandmother
- Veda Agarwal as Vaishnavi Singh Thakur, Balwant Singh and Nandini’s daughter; Krishnamurthy's granddaughter; Shivani's niece
- Himaja as Abbavaram’s wife and Krishnamurthy’s eldest daughter
- Jeevan Kumar as Constable Basha
- Manik Reddy
- Sandeep Raj as Manohar Naidu, Trimurthulu's younger brother
- Sampath Ram as Gangaram, Daaku Maharaaj's henchman
- Ravi Kale as Maan Singh, Daaku Maharaaj's henchman
- Divi Vadthya as Jhansi, Daaku Maharaaj's henchwoman
- Shine Tom Chacko as Special Task Force Inspector Stephen Raj
- Vasu Inturi as Constable
- Keshav Deepak as Doctor
- Sarayu Roy as Doctor
- Sekhar as himself in the song "Dabidi Dibidi" (cameo appearance)
- Bobby Kolli as himself in the song "Dabidi Dibidi" (cameo appearance)

== Production ==
=== Development ===
After the release of Chiranjeevi-starrer Waltair Veerayya (2023), its director Bobby Kolli was reported to be collaborating with Rajinikanth on a potential film, which would mark his Tamil cinema debut and be produced by Dil Raju's Sri Venkateswara Creations. However, Rajinikanth was not convinced by Bobby's script and chose not to sign the film. Bobby then narrated the same script to Nandamuri Balakrishna, who was interested in the script and agreed to be a part of the film.

Tentatively titled NBK109 because it was Balakrishna's 109th film as the lead actor, the film was produced by Suryadevara Naga Vamsi and Sai Soujanya under Sithara Entertainments, Srikara Studios and Fortune Four Cinemas, and was announced on Balakrishna's birthday (10 June 2023). A traditional pooja ceremony was held on the same day for the film's launch. The film's title Daaku Maharaaj was announced with a teaser trailer on 15 November 2024.

=== Casting ===
In November 2023, Bobby Deol was reported to play the film's antagonist, while his involvement was confirmed on 27 January 2024, coinciding with Deol's birthday. Although it was the second Telugu film he had signed after Hari Hara Veera Mallu: Part 1, this film was the first to be released, marking his Telugu cinema debut. Pragya Jaiswal was cast as the female lead. Kannada actor Rishi, who was known for acting in the television series Shaitan (2023), was also cast as the secondary antagonist.

Vishwak Sen was initially offered an important role in the film but turned it down because he wanted a substantial role. Similarly, Dulquer Salmaan also denied reports that he was a part of the cast. Prakash Raj was also rumoured to be in this film. Though Gautham Vasudev Menon was reported to play an important role, he did not sign the film. Besides Jaiswal, Shraddha Srinath and Urvashi Rautela were cast as the other female leads. Ravi Kishan, Shine Tom Chacko, Sachin Khedekar, Makarand Deshpande, Chandini Chowdary and Veda Agarwal were cast in supporting roles.

=== Filming ===
Principal photography began on 7 November 2023 with the film's first schedule at the Ramoji Film City in Hyderabad. In December, a brief schedule was planned to be held in Ooty for a few weeks, but due to the uncertain weather conditions, the team wrapped the shoot much earlier than planned. Rautela participated in filming in Hyderabad in January 2024. The schedule lasted four months and was completed by February 2024, resulting in 50 percent of the film's shooting being completed.

The second schedule began in late April 2024, with Deol joining the film's production. In July 2024, Rautela suffered a major injury while filming an action sequence, sustaining fractures. The team continued a major production schedule in Jaipur, and Deol wrapped his portions in August 2024. Filming wrapped in December 2024.

== Music ==
Daaku Maharaaj

Soundtrack album by Thaman S
- Released: 27 February 2025
- Recorded: 2024–25
- Genre: Feature film soundtrack
- Length: 17:40
- Language: Telugu
- Label: Aditya Music

Thaman S chronology
Game Changer (2025)	Daaku Maharaaj (2025)	Sabdham (2025)
External audio
- Audio Jukebox on YouTube

The soundtrack and background score were composed by Thaman S. The first single, titled "The Rage of Daaku", was released on 14 December 2024. The second single, titled "Chinni", was released on 23 December 2024. The third single, titled "Dabidi Dibidi", was released on 2 January 2025; however, it faced criticism due to vulgar choreography. After the film's OST received considerable praise, the team released the background chanting track "Sarkaru Raa".

No.	Title	Lyrics	Singer(s)	Length
1.	"The Rage of Daaku"	Anantha Sriram	Nakash Aziz, Bharath Raj, Ritesh G. Rao, K. Pranati	3:57
2.	"Chinni"	Anantha Sriram	Vishal Mishra	3:40
3.	"Dabidi Dibidi"	Kasarla Shyam	Thaman S, Vagdevi	4:01
4.	"Sukka Neere"	Anantha Sriram	Thaman S, Riya Seepana	4:17
5.	"Daaku The Intro (Instrumental)"	–	–	1:44
6.	"Sarkaru Raa"	Kasarla Shyam	Arun Koundinya, Sai Charan, Saketh Komanduri, Nazeeruddin, Bharath, Skanda Veluvali, Ritesh, Saatvik, Saketh Kommajosyula, Naresh, Maanas, Abhishek, Shourya, Adviteeya, Sruthi, Pranati, Rajani, Sindhuja	2:58
Total length:				20:37

== Marketing ==
The first glimpse of the film was launched on 8 March 2024, coinciding with Maha Shivaratri. The second glimpse was launched on Balakrishna's birthday (10 June 2024). The film's title teaser was launched at the Shilpakala Vedika in Hyderabad on 15 November. The film's trailer was launched at the pre-release event held in Dallas, Texas, on 4 January 2025 at 9:09 p.m. CST, while it was unveiled in India on 5 January at 8:39 a.m. IST.

== Release ==
=== Theatrical ===
Daaku Maharaaj was released theatrically on 12 January 2025, during the Sankranti holidays. The Tamil-dubbed version of the film was released on 17 January 2025. The Hindi-dubbed version of the film was released on 24 January 2025.

=== Distribution ===
The film's distribution in the Telugu region and overseas was handled by Radha Krishna Entertainments, while distribution in the United States was handled by Shloka Entertainments. Jai Viratra Entertainment Ltd (JVEL) handled the Hindi distribution of the film.

=== Home media ===
The film began streaming on Netflix from 21 February 2025 in Telugu and dubbed versions in Tamil, Kannada, Malayalam and Hindi.

== Reception ==
=== Critical response ===
Paul Nicodemus of The Times of India gave 3.5/5 stars and wrote, "Daaku Maharaaj is a high-octane entertainer that thrives on Nandamuri Balakrishna’s commanding performance, stylish action sequences, and impressive technical values. While it doesn’t reinvent storytelling, it offers an engaging cinematic experience and a treat for Balakrishna’s fans." Sashidhar Adivi of Times Now gave 3/5 stars and wrote "On the whole, Daaku Maharaaj starts off promisingly with an engaging first half. But follows a routine and predictable fare. Perhaps the second half calls for better writing."

Avinash Ramachandran of The Indian Express gave 2.5/5 stars and wrote "Basically, Daaku Maharaaj had all things in place for a gripping social drama that looks a million bucks, but it crumbles under the weight of the familiar because sound and sight can only do so much to a film that never takes flight." Janani K of India Today gave 2.5/5 stars and wrote "Bobby Kolli tried his best to cover up with the proceedings in the film, but it failed after a while. Daaku Maharaaj is a decent template entertainer with classic Balayya elements to keep you hooked."

Srivathsan Nadadhur of The Hindu wrote "Bobby Kolli’s attempt to dish out a ‘different-looking’ Balakrishna film is a mixed bag. Apart from Balakrishna and Shraddha Srinath's performances, the action choreography, cinematography and the music salvages it to an extent."
