= Sundaram Master (film) =

2024 Indian Telugu film

- Theatrical release poster
- Directed by: Kalyan Santhosh
- Story by: Kalyan Santhosh
- Produced by: Ravi Teja; Sudheer Kumar Kurru
- Starring: Harsha Chemudu; Divya Sripada; Harsha Vardhan
- Cinematography: Deepak Yaragera
- Edited by: Karthik Vunnava
- Music by: Sricharan Pakala
- Production companies: RT Team Works; Goal den Media
- Release date: 23 February 2024
- Running time: 121 minutes
- Country: India
- Language: Telugu

Sundaram Master is a 2024 Indian Telugu comedy drama film written and directed by Kalyan Santhosh. It was produced by Ravi Teja and Sudheer Kumar Kurru under RT Team Works and Goal den Media. It stars Harsha Chemudu, Divya Sripada and Harsha Vardhan in lead roles.

== Plot ==
Sundar Rao is sent to teach English in Miryalametta. He also has a secret job. He must find a treasure rumoured to be hidden in the village. He is selfish and cares mostly about money. He agrees to go only reluctantly.

The local MLA gives him the task. Sundar must find the one valuable thing that draws looters to the village. Then he must trick the villagers and smuggle it out.

He is the first outsider in ninety years to enter Miryalametta. The villagers are a tribal community that lives apart from the outside world. He expects simple tribals, but they talk back to him in perfect English. They speak it well but cannot spell. In the village, dark skin and plumpness are admired, so the women fawn over him. Myna, a villager, has a crush on him.

Sundar keeps trying to fool the villagers, but their innocence stuns him again and again. They live simply and happily, and that slowly begins to change him. He grows more compassionate as he spends time with them.

== Cast ==
- Harsha Chemudu as Sundar Rao
- Divya Sripada as Myna
- Harsha Vardhan as MLA
- Balakrishna Neelakantapuram as Peddayya
- Bhadram
- Chaitanya as Oja

== Production ==
A first look of the film was unveiled by Ravi Teja on 22 June 2023. On 15 February 2024, the trailer was released by Chiranjeevi.

== Soundtrack ==
The soundtrack and background score were composed by Sricharan Pakala. Divo acquired the audio rights.

Sundaram Master track listing
No.	Title	Lyrics	Singer(s)	Length
1.	"Sun Sun Sundaram Master"	Kittu Vissapragada	Baba Sehgal	3:02

== Release ==
The film had a theatrical release on 23 February 2024.

== Reception ==
123 Telugu gave the film 2.5/5 stars and stated that Sundaram Master delivers laughs with Harsha Chemudu's performance, but suffers from a thin plot and weak screenplay. Paul Nicodemus of India Times gave the film 3 out of 5 stars and stated that Sundaram Master balances humor and heartfelt drama in an office setting, with strong performances, visuals, and music, despite some narrative flaws. Bhavana Sarvepalli of Times Now gave the film 3/5 stars and wrote that Sundaram Master delivers captivating storytelling with skillful cinematography and commendable background score. Bhargav Chaganti from NTV Telugu gave the film 2.5 out of 5 stars and stated that The transition from the villager's innocence and Sundaram Master's pursuit to the sudden insertion of a social message appeared abrupt and disjointed to viewers. Sangeetha Devi Dundoo of The Hindu stated that "Sundaram Master may not be flawless, but it is an earnest indie film that encourages viewers to live more consciously".
