= Sudheer Varma (actor) =

Indian Telugu film actor (1989–2023)

- Died: 23 January 2023 (aged 34)
- Years active: 2012–2020

Sudheer Varma (died 23 January 2023) was an Indian Telugu actor who starred in films such as Second Hand (2013) and Kundanapu Bomma (2016). He died by suicide at his residence on 23 January 2023.

== Filmography ==
Year	Title	Role	Notes	Ref.
2012	Neeku Naaku Dash Dash	Nagendra		
2013	Second Hand	Santosh		
2014	Poga	Venky		
2016	Kundanapu Bomma	Vasu	Lead	
2019	Lots of Love (LOL)	Srinivas Raju	MX Player series	
2020	Shootout at Alair		ZEE5 series	
