= Sudhakar Komakula =

Indian actor

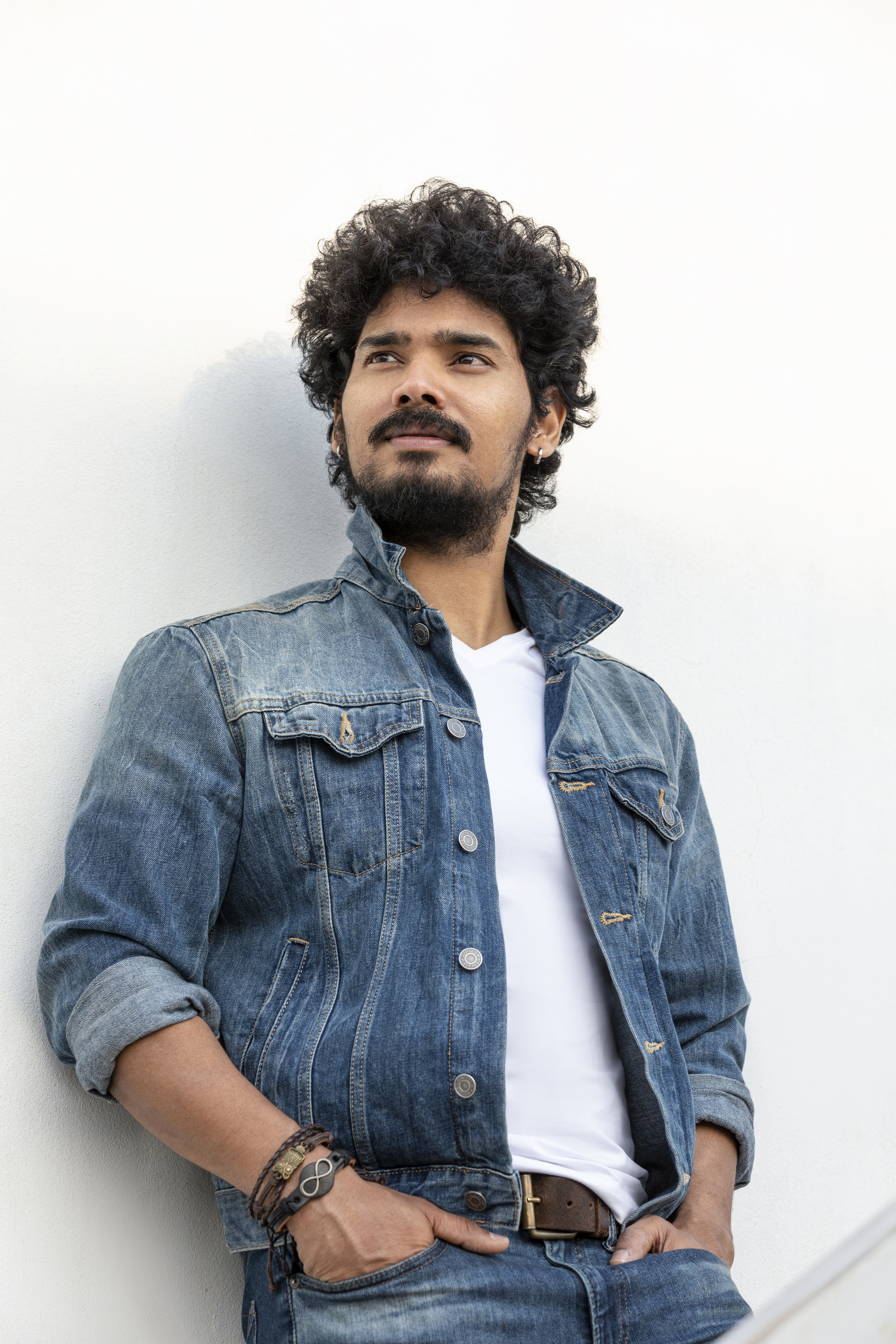
- Komakula in 2021
- Occupation: Actor
- Years active: 2002–present

Sudhakar Komakula is an Indian actor who works in Telugu cinema. He made his lead debut in the film Life Is Beautiful (2012).

== Career ==
Sudhakar Komakula was a part of a dance group in Visakhapatnam. He bagged a role in Manasutho (2002) when the music director of the film, Ashirvad Luke, introduced him to the makers of the film. He shared screen space with Brahmanandam in the film and later played a supporting role in Oka V Chitram (2006). However, both of these films failed to provide the actor a big break. He received a breakthrough with Sekhar Kammula's coming of age film Life is Beautiful (2012). He garnered acclaim for his character's Telangana accent. After the success of the film, he went on to act in several films including the thriller Hang Up! (2014), the romantic drama Vundile Manchi Kalam Mundu Munduna (2014), the romantic comedy Kundanapu Bomma (2016), and the romantic, action drama film Nuvvu Thopu Raa (2019) in which he used a Telangana accent again.

He turned singer for Nuvvu Thopu Raa. In 2023 his movie Narayana & Co released and got mixed talk.

Sudhakar Komakula produced and featured in the "Memories" music video, released by Adivi Sesh on YouTube. This video was also released in multiple languages.

== Filmography ==
Year	Film	Role	Notes
2002	Manasutho		
2006	Oka V Chitram	Aspiring Actor	
2012	Life Is Beautiful	Nagaraj	
2014	Hang Up!	Kunal	
2014	Vundiley Manchikalam Mundhu Mundhuna	Raju	
2016	Kundanapu Bomma	Gopu	
2019	Nuvvu Thopu Raa	Suri	Also creative producer, choreographer, and singer for "Oggu Katha" and "Porilante BP Sugar"
2021	Krack	Kiran	
2021	Raja Vikramarka	Govind Narayan	
2023	Narayana & Co	Anand	Also producer
