= Kundanapu Bomma =

- Theatrical release poster
- Directed by: Vara Mullapudi
- Written by: Vara Mullapudi
- Produced by: Dil Raju
- Starring: Chandini Chowdary; Sudhakar Komakula; Sudheer Varma
- Cinematography: S. D. Jaan
- Edited by: Kotagiri Venkateshwara Rao
- Music by: M. M. Keeravaani
- Production company: Sri Venkateswara Creations
- Distributed by: Sri Venkateswara Creations
- Release date: 24 June 2016
- Running time: 135 minutes
- Country: India
- Language: Telugu

Kundanapu Bomma is a 2016 Indian Telugu language film directed by Vara Mullapudi, of Naa Alludu (2005) fame. It stars Chandini Chowdary, Sudhakar Komakula and Sudheer Varma.

== Cast ==
- Sudheer Varma as Vasu
- Chandini Chowdary as Suchi
- Sudhakar Komakula as Gopi
- Shakalaka Shankar
- Ajay Ghosh
- Nagineedu
- Rajeev Kanakala

== Reviews ==
The Times of India gave the film two out of five stars stating, "In all, there are but a few light moments in the movie that will make you chuckle". The Hindu gave the film one out of five stars stating, "Stale and silly".

This title of this movie is taken from a song in “Ye Maaya Chesave” sung by Benny Dayal & Kalyani Menon.
