= Vunnadhi Okate Zindagi =

2017 film directed by Kishore Tirumala

- Theatrical release poster
- Directed by: Kishore Tirumala
- Written by: Kishore Tirumala
- Produced by: Sravanthi Ravi Kishore; Krishna Chaitanya Pothineni
- Starring: Ram Pothineni; Sree Vishnu; Lavanya Tripathi; Anupama Parameswaran
- Cinematography: Sameer Reddy
- Edited by: A. Sreekar Prasad
- Music by: Devi Sri Prasad
- Production companies: Sravanthi Cinematics; PR Movies
- Release date: 27 October 2017
- Running time: 152 minutes
- Country: India
- Language: Telugu
- Budget: ₹15 crore
- Box office: est. ₹20 crore

Vunnadhi Okate Zindagi (transl. There Is Only One Life) is a 2017 Indian Telugu-language coming-of-age drama film written and directed by Kishore Tirumala. Produced by Sravanthi Ravi Kishore and Krishna Chaitanya Pothineni, under Sravanthi Cinematics and PR Cinemas, it stars Ram Pothineni, Sree Vishnu, Lavanya Tripathi and Anupama Parameswaran.

The principal photography was completed in 2017. The film released on 27 October 2017, to mixed reviews from critics. At the box office, it earned ₹20 crore and was termed a moderate box office success.

== Plot ==
The story revolves around five childhood friends Abhi, Vasu, Sai, Satish and Koushik. Abhi is a restaurant owner in Milan. He meets a girl named Shreya and becomes friends with her. Shreya falls in love with him and proposes to him, but Abhi declines. When Shreya asks why he narrates his flashback.

Abhi and his friends are very close and are always there for one another. Things change when Abhi and Vasu fall in love with the same girl, Mahalakshmi a.k.a. Maha, who is studying medicine. After knowing that she is a classical singer, Abhi gives her a chance to sing in his band after observing her voice, and Vasu encourages her to perform in the program by getting the acceptance of her parents. But when both reveal that they love the same girl, they decide to ask her whom she loves and at that night she thinks that who must she choose. Then she reveals that she loves Vasu. But Abhi doesn't mind as he is a happy-go-lucky guy. Vasu begins to spend more time with Maha and starts ignoring Abhi. He also forgets to go to Abhi's mother's grave on the day of her death, as he always does, and goes to celebrate Maha's parents' anniversary, instead. This starts a fight between them. Vasu says that priorities change with time and this time Maha is his priority. After hearing this, Abhi gets hurt and leaves for Milan without telling anyone.

Back in the present, Abhi meets Vasu's sister, Ramya, in his own restaurant and finds out that Maha died in a car accident. Abhi feels bad about losing Maha and he feels responsible for Vasu's situation. He learns of Sai's marriage and decides to attend it. Abhi leaves to Ooty for the marriage, only to find Vasu becomes dull and lifeless after Maha's death four years ago. Vasu avoids Abhi for some days as Abhi left him alone when he was needed the most.

Vasu and Abhi meet a girl named Meghana a.k.a. Maggie and her friend, Kanuka, who are the wedding planners for Sai's marriage. Meanwhile, Sai's marriage has been canceled because of an argument between Sai's mother and the bride Srushti because of a petty issue with Srushti's dog. Maggie feels stressed about her loan because she had invested a lot of money and hopes on this wedding. Though she was in loss, she had invested through loans and she didn't pay back any of them. Abhi decides to pay her loan installment. Maggie promises Abhi to pay him back with interest. Later, the gang decides to forget about the wedding and plan for a trek. On the way to their trek, the local taxi drivers stop them to organize a monopoly system by force and push Maggie, which leads to a fight between them and Abhi. When Abhi is hit by one of the goons, Vasu joins the fight. Later, Abhi pours his heart out that he didn't know about Maha and tells Vasu that he would have come immediately if he knew. They both happily unite after sorting out their differences. As they all spend time together, Maggie becomes close to both Vasu and Abhi. Satish thinks that she might cause a fight between Vasu and Abhi again, just like Maha did.

In a sudden encounter, Maha's friend Usha gives Maha's personal belongings to Vasu. Later, with the help of Abhi, Sai confesses his feelings on Srushti. Srushti accepts his proposal. Then, the marriage programs begin again according to the plan with the acceptance of their families. After the completion of the wedding, Satish convinces Abhi that Vasu loves Maggie and tells him to let them be together. Then Abhi leaves the place without telling anyone. Later Maggie and Vasu ask about Abhi, making Satish reveal everything to them. Vasu tells him that he doesn't have any feelings for Maggie and that they are just good friends. Then, the gang finds him in Ooty's railway station.

Vasu reveals that he went through Maha's things and learned the truth. Vasu reads her diary and gets to know that she actually loved Abhi, and not him. A day before saying yes to Vasu, Maha met Abhi and proposed to him. But Abhi requested her to accept Vasu's proposal because he is very sensitive and might get depressed otherwise. Maha obeyed Abhi and accepted Vasu's proposal. Later, she understood Vasu's love and changed her mind. At the end of the diary, she asked herself about what would happen if Vasu learned about this. Would he have been ok with what happened? Then, Vasu asks Abhi why he did that. Abhi says that when he lost his mother, Vasu took her place in his life and that his priorities wouldn't have changed anytime, meaning Vasu would always be a priority to Abhi. Vasu unites Abhi and Maggie and the film ends with everyone smiling and looking happy.

== Cast ==
- Ram Pothineni as Abhiram "Abhi"
  - Master Hansik as young Abhi
- Sree Vishnu as Vemuri "Vasu" Vasudevaiah
  - Dakshith as young Vasu
- Lavanya Tripathi as Meghana "Maggie"
- Anupama Parameswaran as Mahalakshmi "Maha"
- Priyadarshi Pullikonda as Sathish
- Kireeti Damaraju as Sai
- Himaja as Kanuka
- Anand as Abhi's father
- Prabhu as Vasu's father
- Raj Madiraju as Maha's father
- Ashish Gandhi as Raghu
- Koushik Rachapudi as Koushik
- Priya Chowdary as Usha, Maha's friend
- Kaumudi Nemani as Srushti, Sai's fiancée
- Alka Rathore as Ramya, Vasu's sister
- Geetanjali as Vasu's grandmother
- Srinivas Avasarala as Srikrishna
- Vennela Kishore as Kishore
- Raja Chembolu as Aditya
- Ranadhir Reddy as Dhanunjay
- Anisha Ambrose as Shreya (Cameo appearance)

== Production ==
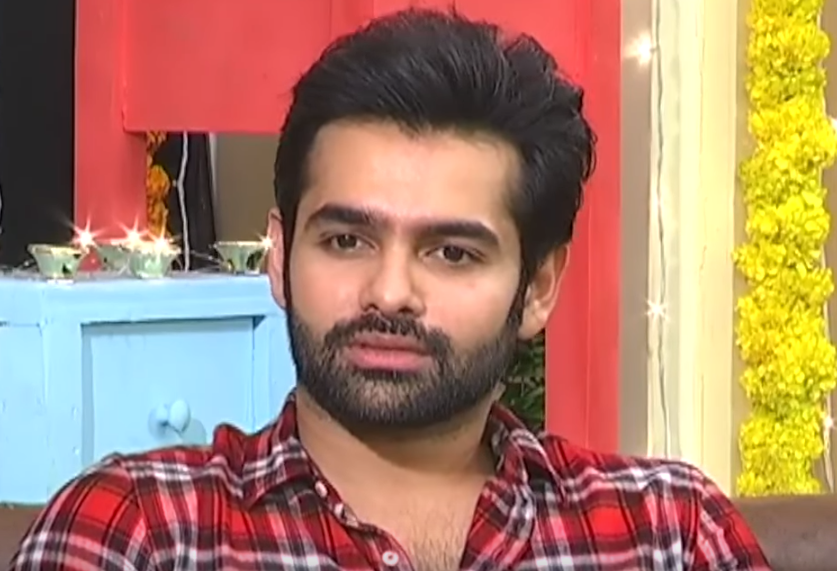
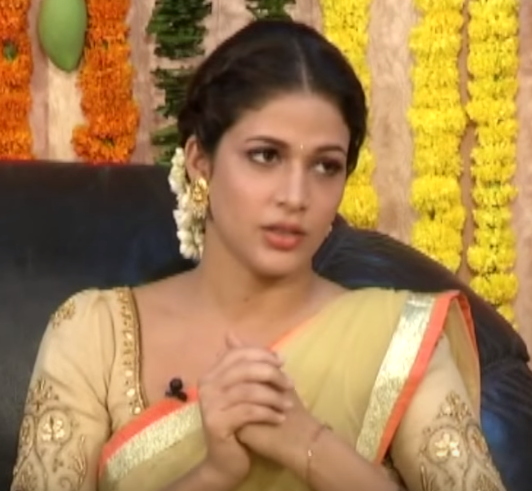
The film starred Ram Pothineni and Lavanya Tripathi in their first collaboration.

Vunnadhi Okate Zindagi marks Kishore Tirumala's fourth film as a director. He added, "I have many friends and I took some particular aspects happened in their life as an inspiration for this film. The film has a conflict point told in a simplistic and interesting way. The narration and the characters will definitely strike a chord with the audience."

Ram Pothineni was cast to play Abhi, in his second project with director Kishore Tirumala, after Nenu Sailaja (2016). Lavanya Tripathi was cast to play Meghna, after Megha Akash left the film. Anupama Parameswaran was cast as Maha and Sree Vishnu was cast as Vasu.

Principal photography began in 2017. The film has been shot at locations including Araku, Ooty, Vishakhapatnam and Italy. The filming was completed in September 2017.

== Soundtrack ==
Vunnadhi Okate Zindagi

Soundtrack album by Devi Sri Prasad
- Released: 6 August 2017
- Recorded: 2017
- Genre: Soundtrack
- Length: 19:28
- Label: Aditya Music
- Producer: Jahan Sarkar

Devi Sri Prasad chronology
Jai Lava Kusa (2016)	Vunnadhi Okate Zindagi (2017)	Middle Class Abbayi (2015)

The music was composed by Devi Sri Prasad, with lyrics written by Chandrabose and Sri Mani. Later, the song "Trendu Maarina" was separately released on Friendship Day.

Vunnadhi Okate Zindagi (Original Motion Picture Soundtrack)
No.	Title	Lyrics	Singer(s)	Length
1.	"Trend Maarina"	Chandrabose	Devi Sri Prasad	3:06
2.	"Whatamma What is This Amma"	Sri Mani	Devi Sri Prasad	4:08
3.	"Rayyi Rayyi Mantu"	Sri Mani	Divya Kumar, M. M. Manasi	4:06
4.	"Life is a Rainbow"	Chandrabose	Yazin Nizar, Priya Himesh	4:33
5.	"Everest"	Sri Mani	Sagar	5:03
Total length:				19:28

== Release ==
Vunnadhi Okate Zindagi was released on 27 October 2017. The film had its television release in February 2018, and the film was later made available on Zee5.

== Reception ==
=== Critical reception ===
Sangeetha Devi Dundoo of The Hindu wrote: "There's a lot to like in this film and yet, it feels like a stretch. A crispier narrative would have made it a good coming-of-age buddy flick". The Times of India gave 3 out of 5 stars, stating: "The film is beautifully shot, with the locales of Vizag and Ooty adding in to its laid-back vibe. Music by Devi Sri Prasad is translated better on-screen than expected". 123telugu wrote: "On the whole, Vunnadi Okkate Zingadi is a simple and emotional tale of friendship and love. The film will attract the youth more, but the proceedings are a bit slow and predictable making the film a passable watch."

Karthik Keramalu of The News Minute stated: "Kishore Tirumala’s Vunnadhi Okate Zindagi is an enjoyable ride with inflammable emotions like friendship, friendship, and friendship. Suresh Kavirayani wrote: "The performances are good, cinematography is a big asset. Save for a couple songs, Devi Sri Prasad’s music is not really up there. It comes as a bit of a let down from Nenu Sailaja." Shekhar H Hooli of IB Times stated: "Tirumala has come up with a novel musical love story, which is all about friendship, love and breakup. The director has also created an engaging and entertaining screenplay. But it is slightly dragging in parts especially in the second half."

=== Box office ===
Made on a budget of ₹15 crore, the film collected ₹17.4 crore over the weekend and ₹20 crore in 10 days. The film was a moderate success at the box office.

== Accolades ==
Year	Award	Category	Recipient	Result	Ref.
2018	7th South Indian International Movie Awards	Best Supporting Actor – Telugu	Sree Vishnu	Nominated	

== See also ==
- List of highest-grossing Telugu films
- List of Telugu films of 2017
