= Sandeep Raj =

Indian Telugu filmmaker

- Born: 21 June; Vijayawada, Andhra Pradesh, India
- Occupations: Film director; writer; producer; actor
- Known for: Colour Photo
- Spouse: Chandini Rao
- Awards: National Film Award

Sandeep Raj (born 21 June) is an Indian director and screenwriter who works in Telugu cinema .Sandeep specialises in tragic endings unlike many Telugu directors he believes in stories with tragic endings hoping to add Tamil flavours. He made his directorial debut with the film Colour Photo (2020), which received critical acclaim and won the National Film Award for Best Feature Film in Telugu.

== Filmography ==
Key
†	Denotes film or TV productions that have not yet been released

=== As a director and writer ===
Year	Title	Credited as		Notes	Ref.
Year	Title	Director	Writer	Notes	Ref.
2020	Colour Photo	Yes	Screenplay	Directorial debut	
2021	Aakashavaani	No	Screenplay		
2021	Heads and Tales	No	Yes		
2022	Good Luck Sakhi	No	Yes		
2022	Mukhachitram	No	Yes		
2025	Mowgli	Yes	Yes		

=== As an actor ===
Year	Title	Role	Ref.
2019	Agent Sai Srinivasa Athreya	Ajay	
2022	Mishan Impossible	Farooq	
2022	Sita Ramam	Cameo	
2024	Ambajipeta Marriage Band	Village guy	
2025	Daaku Maharaaj	Manohar Naidu	
2025	Bhairavam	Puli Ravindra	
2025	Mowgli	Cameo	

=== Television ===
Year	Title	Role	Network	Notes
2025	AIR: All India Rankers	Coordinator	ETV Win	Also producer

== Awards and nominations ==
Award	Category	work	Result	Ref.
National Film Awards	Best Feature Film in Telugu	Colour Photo	Won	
South Indian International Movie Awards	Best Debut Director – Telugu	Colour Photo	Nominated	
Gaddar Telangana Film Awards	Gaddar Telangana Film Award for Second Best Feature Film	Colour Photo	Won	
Aha Entertainment Awards	Best Director	Colour Photo	Won	

== Personal life ==
On 7 December 2024, he married Chandini Rao, an actress and classical dancer.
