= Narayana & Co =

2023 Telugu comedy drama film

- Directed by: Chinna Papisetty
- Story by: Ravi Goli; Dialogue: Rajiv Kosanam
- Produced by: Papisetty Brothers; Sudhakar Komakula
- Starring: Sudhakar Komakula; Arati; Devi Prasad
- Cinematography: Rahul Shrivatsav
- Edited by: Srujana Adusumilli
- Music by: Dr. Josyabhatla Sharma; Naga Vamshi; Suresh Bobbili
- Production companies: Papisetty Film Productions; Sukha Media
- Release date: 30 June 2023
- Running time: 136 minutes
- Country: India
- Language: Telugu

Narayana & Co is a 2023 Indian Telugu-language comedy drama film directed by Chinna Papisetty in his directorial debut. It stars Sudhakar Komakula, Devi Prasad, Amani, and Vijay Krishna in key roles. It is produced by the Papisetty Brothers, Sudhakar Komakula under Papisetty Film Productions, and Sukha Media. The Background score was composed by Syed Kamran. The trailer for the movie was released by Vishwak Sen. The film was released on 30 June 2023, and received mixed reviews.

== Plot ==
Narayana's middle-class family faces financial struggles, with sons Anand and Subhash losing money. Narayana's sons Anand and Subhash are blackmailed, leading to an unlawful transaction. The main conflict revolves around the family's next steps.

== Cast ==
- Sudhakar Komakula as Anand
- Arati Podi as Preethi
- Devi Prasad as Narayana
- Aamani as Janu
- Yamini Bandaru as Sona
- Pooja Kiran as Nalini
- Jay Krishna as Subhash
- Saptagiri as Mohan Rao
- Ali Reza as Arjun
- Shiva Ramachandrapu as Surya
- Thotapalli Madhu as Shankar
- Ragini
- Ananth
- Rajiv K as Mumbai Don

== Reception ==
Narayana & Co received mixed reviews from critics and audience. Avad Mohammad of OTTplay gave it 2.5 out of 5 stars and wrote,"On the whole, Narayana & Co has some really fun moments in the first half. The film falters in the latter part when things needed to be serious. The lack of gripping thrills and seriousness in the narration brings this film down by the end of the second half.

The Hans India has given it a rating of 2 out of 5 stars and wrote "The story begins with the introduction of the Narayan family characters. After that, the lead pair meets in a pub. However, the reason for the heroine falling in love with the hero did not seem convincing. But the comedy scenes are entertaining. And the second half is a bit routine. Placement of songs is not correct. On a whole, 'Narayana and Co' succeeded in making the audience laugh.
