= Heads and Tales (film) =

- Film poster
- Directed by: Sai Krishna Enreddy
- Written by: Sandeep Raj
- Starring: Divya Sripada; Chandi Rao; Sri Vidya Maharshi
- Music by: Mani Sharma
- Distributed by: ZEE5
- Release date: 22 October 2021
- Country: India
- Language: Telugu

Heads and Tales is a 2021 Indian Telugu-language thriller drama film directed by Sai Krishna Enreddy. The film stars Divya Sripada, Chandi Rao and Sri Vidya Maharshi. The film was released on 22 October 2021 on ZEE5.

== Cast ==
- Divya Sripada as P.C. Alivelu Manga
- Sri Vidya Maharshi as Anisha
- Chandini Rao as Shruti
- Arun Kumar as Venkateswarlu, Manga's husband
- Kivish Kautilya as Anisha's abusive fiancée
- Suhas as Anisha's friend
- Sunil in a cameo appearance as God
- Raghuram as Interviewer to God (cameo appearance)

== Reception ==
A critic from Cinema Express rated the film three out of five stars and wrote that "It is a joy to watch when characters in films do not behave like they are conscious of the fact that they are in a film. It takes effort to create “realness”, a mood that persists through most parts of Heads and Tales, written by Sandeep Raj and directed by Sai Krishna Enreddy". A critic from The Times of India wrote that "The concept Heads & Tales is based on sounds pretty good on paper, but when it comes to the narration and execution of these characters and the film’s plot points, the director falters. While the performances are laudable, the subdued narration is a let-down".
