= Kanabadutaledu =

- Theatrical release poster
- Directed by: Balaraju M
- Written by: Balaraju M
- Produced by: Prasad Machanuru; Srinivas Kishan Anapu; Deviprasad Balivada; Satish Raju; Dileep Kurapati
- Starring: Sukranth Veerella; Vaishali Raj; Sunil
- Cinematography: Sandeep Baddula
- Edited by: Raviteja Kurmana
- Music by: Madhu Ponnas
- Production companies: SS Films; Shade Studios; Sree Padha Creations
- Distributed by: Silly Monks Entertainment
- Release date: 19 August 2021
- Running time: 115 minutes
- Country: India
- Language: Telugu

Kanabadutaledu (transl. Missing) is a 2021 Indian Telugu-language crime thriller film written and directed by Balaraju M. The film stars Sunil as Detective Rama Krishna whilst Vaishali Raj, Sukranth Veerella, Himaja, Praveen, Ravi Varma, and Kireeti Damaraju play pivotal roles. Initially scheduled to release on 14 April 2021, the film was postponed due to the COVID-19 pandemic. Kanabadutaledu was theatrically released on 19 August 2021.

== Plot ==
In Visakhapatnam, the dead body of a man brutally murdered is found in a dump. Although all outer identity markers have been burnt off by the murderer, a metal plate in the body's leg allows the authorities to identify the man, named Michael, and they get his friend to testify as a witness in exchange for a pardon. Meanwhile, in Hyderabad, Aditya bemoans his lifeless marriage with Sashida. One day, though, Sashida makes her first request for him: to go to Vizag and kill Surya, her ex that she had been trying to contact. Craving for her attention, he accepts and asks her why on the way. After a flashback to her whirlwind romance with Surya, a delivery driver, and her family's opposition to their love, she reveals that she tried to elope but Surya ditched her at the train station with a mocking SMS stating her property wasn't coming along. She came back home and agreed soon afterward to an arranged marriage with Aditya, but couldn't forget Surya and still tried to contact him, so she wants to kill him to eradicate his presence in her life. When they arrive, however, they discover that Surya is missing and presumed dead. They decide to stay with her family and try to find him. Meanwhile, Chief Inspector Victor Raju, a lecherous officer who abuses his power to sexually harass women that happens to be in charge of the murder case as well as upholding a construction ban on a less-than-honest company, is killed by a shadowy figure. Sashida decides to contact Rama Krishna, a local detective with out-of-the-box thinking, to find Surya.

Through his investigation, Rama Krishna finds Surya's best friend and fellow driver, an older man nicknamed "Mavayya" (Uncle), who says that Surya was committed to the elopement and had even sent him away to avoid trouble, making him suspect something happened to Surya that caused him disappearance. He suspects three people: Michael, who Surya had fought with when he attacked Sashida and her friend who had just broken up with him; Nikhil, Sashida's brother who held a grudge against Surya after they had fought over his love, and Aditya, who had known Sashida and fell in love with her before the marriage and was enraged when he learned about Surya. Rama Krishna continues, but nearly loses his life after an attack by an unknown assailant. Realizing that something is quite wrong with the case, he pursues Michael's friend, who after a brief chase reveals he had lied to the police under Victor Raju's prerogative. Michael had in fact attacked Surya on the day of the elopement but kept him alive for weeks in tortuous conditions for money. After Michael was killed, Victor Raju led him to lie that Surya killed Michael. After pondering this, Rama Krishna has a realization. One day, he invites Nikhil's wife for questioning and unveils her past. As a child, she had committed several violent acts and showed a bloodthirsty shade. Enraged by Surya's treatment of her husband, she paid Michael to attack him, but he blackmailed her, so she killed him. Raju's investigation did lead him to her, but he covered up the murder in exchange for trying to get sexual favors form her, so she killed him as well. She tries to kill Rama Krishna and claims he will never find Surya; however, he reveals that they found him alive and she is arrested. In the hospital, Sashida and Surya reunite and Aditya pays Rama Krishna the fees, stating that he wanted to show her that she should stay with someone she loves.

== Cast ==
- Sukranth Veerella as Surya, Sashi's lover
- Vaishali Raj as Sashidha
- Yug Ram as Aditya, Sashi's husband
- Sunil as Detective Rama Krishna
- Himaja as Sashi's Sister-in-law
- Ravi Varma as Nikhil
- Kireeti Damaraju
- Praveen
- Kancharapalem Subbarao as Mavayya
- Kishore Kumar Polimera as C.I. Victor Raju
- Sashith Kona
- Neelima Palishetty
- Soumya Shetty
- Uma Maheswara Rao
- Kancharapalem Shyam
- Santhosh singuru

== Soundtrack ==
All music is composed by Madhu Ponnas.

No.	Title	Lyrics	Singer(s)	Length
1.	"Tholisari Nene"	Chandrabose	Haricharan	4:42
2.	"Ammamo Em Ammayo"	Madhu Nandan B.	Gold Devaraj	4:18
3.	"Mama Mama"	Madhu Nandan B.	Rahul Nambiar	4:05
4.	"Yedakemai Untunde"	Purna Chary	Karthik	4:09
5.	"Premey Ledhu"	Madhu Nandan B.	Rahul Sipligunj, Ravi Prakash Chodimalla	4:41

== Release ==
The film was initially scheduled to release on 14 April 2021 but was postponed due to the COVID-19 pandemic. The release date was rescheduled as 13 August 2021 but was postponed to 19 August 2021.

== Reception ==
Sravan Vanaparthy of The Times of India rated the film 2 stars out of 5 and called it a "crime thriller minus thrills." Vanaparthy wrote that: "While the story seems strong on paper, with the plot points even raking interest, the execution falters making for a passable watch." A reviewer from Eenadu appreciated the performances of Sunil and Vaishali Raj but criticized the storyline and screenplay. Asianet News Network critic Surya Kumar Joshyula felt that Sunil was underutilized in the film. Joshyula added that while the direction was impressive in parts, overall the narration style dragged the film down. 123telugu.com concluded its review by stating: "On the whole, Kanabadutaledu is a film that has a good plot but is spoilt by some disappointing execution and worse dubbing. Sunil makes some sense in the second half but that is not enough to save the film from sinking."
