= Nuvvu Thopu Raa =

2019 film

- Theatrical release poster
- Directed by: Harinath Babu B.
- Screenplay by: Harinath Babu B.
- Story by: Ajju Mahakali
- Produced by: Srikanth Daduvai; James Watt Kommu; Ritesh Gupta
- Starring: Sudhakar Komakula; Nitya Shetty
- Cinematography: Venkat Dilip Chunduru; Jacob Russo; Prakash Velayudhan
- Edited by: S. B. Uddhav
- Music by: Suresh Bobbili; P. A. Deepak
- Production companies: United Films; SJK Productions, LLC
- Distributed by: Geetha Arts
- Release date: 3 May 2019
- Running time: 150 minutes
- Country: India
- Language: Telugu

Nuvvu Thopu Raa is a 2019 Indian Telugu-language romantic, action drama film directed by Harinath Babu B. and starring Sudhakar Komakula and Nitya Shetty.

== Plot ==
It's a story about an eccentric, free spirited guy, Suri, with a devil-may-care attitude, and a confident, strong-minded middle-class girl, Ramya. Even though he falls for her in the first instance he sees her, she takes her time and makes sure she can handle him before she gives her consent. But due to his careless and egotistic attitude, he breaks up with her. Ramya is affected by the break-up, but being a strong-minded woman, she picks herself up, leaves India and emigrates to the USA.

Life takes Suri on a new journey and he goes to the USA. Facing many hurdles there, he realizes his mistakes; he misses Ramya and understands the value of his mother and her love. His lost emotional connection with his mom and his sister is established. He changes his attitude towards life. Realizing that his love for Ramya, the influence she had on his life is the reason for his changeover, he tries to get back with her.

Ramya is one of the main motivating factors for Suri to decide to get a green card, but he has only one day - a holiday - to achieve it since he works in a gas station where he can't afford to take leave. He has 100 days to prepare for that one day. Suri meets street criminals and drug peddlers in the USA and goes down the wrong path to get his green card. What finally keeps Suri on a righteous path is his love for Ramya and his affection towards his mother. How he finds the purpose of his life, discovers his true self, and uplifts himself due to Ramya's love for him forms the rest of the story.

== Cast ==
- Sudhakar Komakula as Suri
- Nitya Shetty as Ramya
- Nirosha as Savitri, Suri's mother
- Ravi Varma as Azhar
- Sridharan as Suri's father
- Gemini Suresh as Ramesh
- Jabardasth Rakesh as Nikki
- Divya Reddy as Divya
- Fun Bucket Mahesh Vitta as Satti
- Cindy Perez as Isabella
- Deepak Ravella as Attorney
- Vamsi Krishna Vuppaladadium as Dileep Madisetty
- Hiranmayi Srinivasan as Jyo
- Jarred Brannon as John
- Daisy Peidra as Selina
- Claire Brown as Zara
- Raju Anandeshi as Paparao
- Duvvasi Mohan as Ramya's father
- Kalpa Latha as Ramya's mother
- Varun Sandesh as Kaushik (cameo appearance)

== Production ==
Harinath Babu, a protégé of Krishna Vamsi and YVS Chowdary, who also wrote the film's screenplay made his debut as a director with this film, casting Sudhakar Komakula, who garnered acclaim for Life is Beautiful (2012), in the lead role. Nitya Shetty was cast as the lead actress. The film was initially shot in Hyderabad. About 70% of the film was shot in several locations across Utah including Bryce Canyon National Park and Bonneville Salt Flats. The film was shot in the United States for fifty-three days. Komakula plays a man from Saroornagar in the film. The film finished shooting in May of 2018. Nirosha returned to Telugu cinema after a sabbatical with this film. The film was distributed by Allu Aravind and Bunny Vasu.

National Award winner, Padmashri Thota Tharani was the production designer of the film. Among the crew who were part of the filming in the USA are line producer Stephanie Ollertion (USA), location manager Prathap Velavaluri Sekhar (Utah), Edmund Rose (USA), Jake Buntjer (Art Director, USA), Duy Beck (Stunts, USA), and cinematographer Venkat C Dileep (USA). In India, the crew among others were cinematographer Prakash Velayudhan, Vijay Master (Stunts), editor SB Uddhav, sound designer Krishnan Subramanyan and audiographer Siva Kumar. The music director was Suresh Bobbili - all songs of the movie except two were composed by him. He also composed the background score. Guest composer P. A. Deepak (Grammy Award winner) composed two songs and did the final mixing for all the songs. Dolby Atmos mix and sound design was done at AM studios, owned by A. R. Rehman.

== Soundtrack ==
The music was composed by Suresh Bobbili with two songs by P. A. Deepak. Regarding the soundtrack, a critic from The Times of India stated that "All in all, the album of Nuvvu Thopu Raa is good enough for a one-time listen, with the first six numbers standing out".

All music is composed by Suresh Bobbili except where noted.

No.	Title	Lyrics	Music	Singer(s)	Length
1.	"Pada Padamani"	Shreshta	P. A. Deepak	Sayantani Das	3:31
2.	"Oggu Katha to Get US Visa"	Ajju Mahakali, Kasarla Shyam		Sudhakar Komakula	3:20
3.	"Nakentho Nachinde"	Kasarla Shyam		Anurag Kulkarni	3:13
4.	"Pori Poyindi"	Kasarla Shyam	PA Deepak	Gurudeep	4:36
5.	"Akasham"	Sopeti		Krishna Tejasvi, Adi Akkipeddi (rap)	3:42
6.	"Raro Naa Suri"	Kasarla Shyam		Aishwarya, Geetha Madhuri, Suresh Bobbili, Ramya Behara	3:57
7.	"Cheppamma Jeevithama"	Chandrabose		Kaala Bhairava	3:29
8.	"Porilante BP Sugar"	Kasarla Shyam		Sudhakar Komakula, Rakesh Jabardast, Mahesh Vitta, Bhasha	2:34
9.	"Chal Chal Pada"	Kasarla Shyam		Anurag Kulkarni, Sopeti (rap)	3:41
10.	"Emayyavu Nanna"	Chandrabose		Srikrishna	4:20
Total length:					36:23

== Release and reception ==
The film was scheduled to release on 26 April 2019, but was postponed to 3 May 2019.

The film has had mixed reviews. The review on the Utah Film Awards website says, "It was entertaining, fun, exciting, not a dull moment at all". Telangana Today wrote that "This film starts off on a very cliched note with a good-for-nothing young man with more backlogs than one could care for and who is very creepy with his love interest till she falls in love with him. The film explores many aspects of the average aspiring-NRI and this would be one of the reasons why it will succeed as there are many relatable aspects in this film". The News Minute wrote that "The only good part about this movie is its music, a collaboration which amongst others includes Grammy winner Deepak Pallikonda. At times, it is so wonderful, you wonder why such a good song has been wasted in a story that is miles away from being a good romantic tale". The Times of India gave the film a rating of two out of five stars and noted that "With a tighter narrative minus all the fluff and cliché about life in the US, some focus and definitely some direction, Nuvvu Thopu Raa really had the scope to be something else". The Hans India gave the film a rating of two-and-three-quarters out of five stars and wrote that "Overall, 'Nuvvu Thopu Raa' is a one time watch with some visible shortcomings". The New Indian Express wrote that "Despite its promising premise, what’s lacks in this movie is drama, conflict and emotions".

== Awards ==
Awards	Date of ceremony	Category	Nominee	Result	Ref(s)
Utah Film Awards	21 Nov 2020	Made in Utah - Feature	Nuvvu Thopu Raa	Won	
