= Dheera (2024 film) =

2024 Indian Telugu film

- Theatrical release poster
- Directed by: Vikranth Srinivas
- Written by: Vikranth Srinivas
- Produced by: Padmavathi Chadalavada
- Starring: Laksh Chadalavada; Soniya Bansal; Neha Pathan
- Cinematography: P C. Kanna
- Edited by: Vinai Ramaswamy. V
- Music by: Sai Karthik
- Production company: Sri Tirumala Tirupati Venkateswara Films (STTVF)
- Release date: 2 February 2024
- Country: India
- Language: Telugu

Dheera is an Indian Telugu language action thriller film directed by Vikranth Srinivas and produced by Padmavathi Chadalavada, starring Laksh Chadalavada, Neha Pathan and Soniya Bansal as the leads.

Dheera was released on 2 February 2024.

== Plot ==
Things get messy when Ranadheer gets hired to transport the most wanted cargo by road within 48 hours.

== Cast ==
- Laksh Chadalavada as Ranadheer
- Neha Pathan as Amrutha
- Soniya Bansal as Manisha
- Bobby Bedi as Chanakya
- Himaja as Hamsalekha
- Bhushan Kalyan as Raj Guru
- Mirchi Kiran as Kiran
- Naveen Neni as Sathya
- Viva Raghav as Dr. Rahul
- Samrat Reddy as Alex
- Bharani Shankar as ACP Karna
- Suman as Krishna Murthy

== Production ==
The film was announced in April 2022. The first look of the movie was released on 9 October 2022 on Chadalavada's birthday and it was scheduled to be released in September 2023.

== Marketing ==
The first glimpse of the film was released on 9 October 2023 on the birthday of actor Laksh Chandalavada.

== Soundtrack ==
Dheera

Soundtrack album by Sai Karthik
- Released: 2023
- Studio: SS Studios Hyderabad
- Length: 4:32
- Language: Telugu
- Label: Silly Monks Music

Singles from Dheera
- 1. "Adharam Madhuram" Released: 14 February 2023

The music was composed by Sai Kartheek and released by Silly Monks Music. The musical promotions began with the release of the first single Adharam Madhuram on Valentine's Day.

Tracklist
No.	Title	Lyrics	Singer(s)	Length
1.	"Adharam Madhuram"	Balaji	Anurag Kulkarni and ML Sruthi	4:32
Total length:				4:32

== Reception ==
Raisa Nasreen of Timesnownews gave 3 stars out of 5 and wrote "Laksh Chadalavada's Film Is An Intense Drama".
