= Kireeti Damaraju =

Indian Telugu film actor

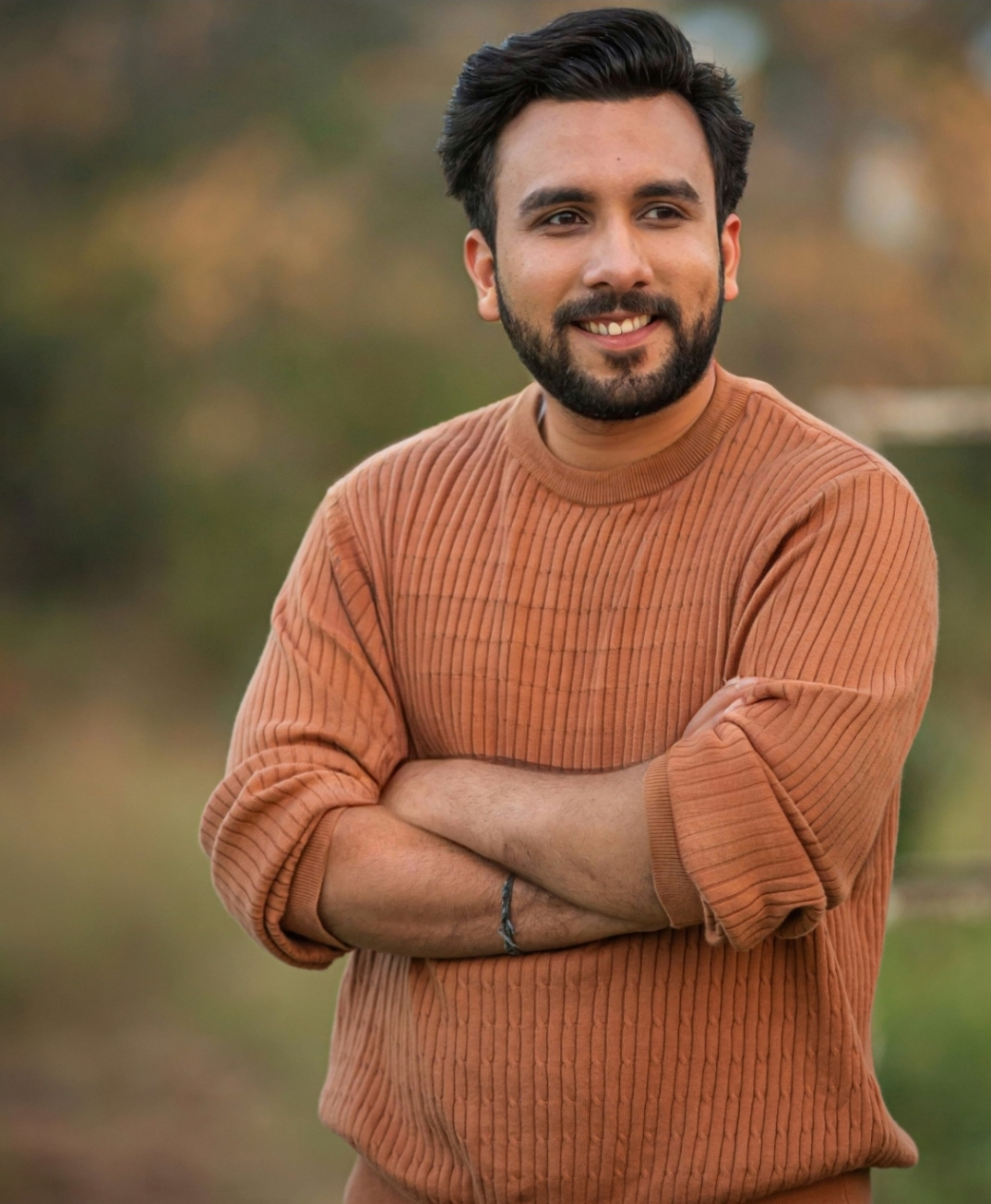
- Born: Andhra Pradesh, India
- Occupation: Actor
- Years active: 2011–present

Kireeti Damaraju is an Indian actor who works in Telugu cinema. He has learned acting and done theatre before venturing into films. He has played supporting roles in films such as Uyyala Jampala (2013), Yevade Subramanyam (2015), Vunnadhi Okate Zindagi (2017) and Mental Madhilo (2017). He was also a contestant in the reality TV show Bigg Boss 2.

== Career ==
Kireeti Damaraju started his acting career by learning acting and doing few Theatre shows and then started acting on screen with the short films Ontiganta and Anukokunda. Anukokunda, which was selected for Cannes gave him the jump start to land in the role of "Subbarao" in the movie Second Hand. In Bham Bolenath, Damaraju plays the role of a drug addict with Naveen Chandra and Idlebrain.com Jeevi remarks that "Pradeep and Kireeti's characters remind us of Ramesh-Suresh duo from Cadbury ads." He also acted in Many Happy Returns, a sitcom directed by Gunnam Gangaraju. Srividya Palaparthi of The Times of India praised Damaraju saying "While Tarun and Avanthika's acting skills were evidently amateur, Kireeti Damaraju stood out in terms of acting, and comic timing."

Before venturing into films, Damaraju worked for Electronic Arts, Hyderabad. He is also an avid gamer and a usability engineering expert. A lot of his thought process and philosophy in life have been inspired from his deep interests in Japanese anime and manga.

== Filmography ==
Year	Title	Role	Notes
2011	Ontiganta	Kiriti	Short film
2012	Anukokunda	Adil Ravindra	Short film
2013	Uyyala Jampala	Murali	Feature film debut
2013	Second Hand	Subbarao	
2015	Yevade Subramanyam	Kireeti	
2015	Bham Bolenath	Roshan	
2015	Size Zero	Prospective Groom	
2015	Columbus	Kireeti	
2015	Thanu Nenu		
2016	Meeku Meere Maaku Meme	Kireeti	
2017	Vunnadhi Okate Zindagi	Sai	
2017	Mental Madhilo	Saki	
2018	Touch Chesi Chudu	Shalini's friend	
2018	Chal Mohan Ranga	Surya	
2018	Vijetha	Ram's friend	
2018	Premaku Raincheck	Naresh	
2018	Taxiwaala	Doctor	
2019	NTR: Kathanayakudu	Pandit	Cameo appearance
2020	Pressure Cooker	Manohar Rao	
2020	Valayam	Madhu Nandhan	
2020	47 Days		
2020	Run	Rahul	
2021	Zombie Reddy	Bhadram	
2021	Kanabadutaledu		
2021	Vivaha Bhojanambu		
2021	Varudu Kaavalenu	Groom	
2022	DJ Tillu	Rohit	
2022	Bloody Mary	Basha	
2022	Dhamaka	Subbu’s fiance	
2023	Amigos	Walking Google	
2023	Chakravyuham:The Trap	Hacker	
2023	Breakout	Arjun	
2024	Swag	Nishkalmasha	
2024	Laggam	Shivaji	
2024	Shivam Bhaje	Sagar	
2025	Eleven	Surendar and Sudhakar	Dual role; Telugu-Tamil bilingual film
2025	Chiranjeeva	Rao	
2025	Santhana Prapthirasthu	Rakesh	
2025	Premante	Madhi’s friend	
2026	Ustaad Bhagat Singh	Journalist	

=== Television ===
Year	Title	Role	Network
2018	Ee Office Lo	Subhash	Viu
2024	Sasimadhanam	Groom	ETV Win
