= Chandini Chowdary =

Indian actress

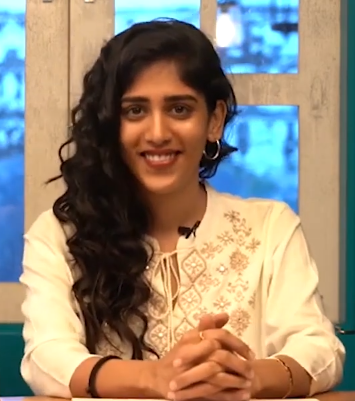
- Chandini Chowdary in 2022
- Born: 23 October 1993 (age 33); Visakhapatnam, Andhra Pradesh, India
- Occupation: Actress
- Years active: 2012–present

Chandini Chowdary is an Indian actress who works in Telugu cinema. Her notable works include Colour Photo (2020), Sammathame (2022) and Gaami (2024).

== Early life ==
Chandini Chowdary was born in a Telugu family in Visakhapatnam, Andhra Pradesh. She graduated in mechanical engineering from Global Academy of Technology, Bengaluru.

== Career ==
Before making her film debut, Chowdary acted in many short films while studying in Bengaluru. One of her short films with actor Raj Tarun, The Blind Date brought her recognition.

Mullapudi Vara and K.Raghavendra Rao, who saw Chandni's performance in the short film Madhuram in 2013, gave her an opportunity in the film Kundanapu Bomma. The movie's production started in January 2015 but her first introduction as a lead to the Telugu film screen in 2015 was with the movie Ketugadu. She played small roles in Life is Beautiful before starring in Kundanapu Bomma (2016), Shamanthakamani (2017) and Howrah Bridge (2018).

Her performance in the web series Masti's was critically acclaimed. She garnered acclaim for her role in Manu (2018). In 2020, she starred in Colour Photo opposite Suhas in which she received praise for her acting skills. Her final release in 2022 was Sammathame.

In 2023, she made her Tamil film debut with Saba Nayagan. She worked on Gaami (2024).

== Filmography ==
Key
†	Denotes films that have not yet been released

=== Film ===
- Note: all films are in Telugu, unless otherwise noted.

List of films and roles
Year	Title	Role	Notes	Ref.
2015	Ketugadu	Akira	Debut film	
2016	Brahmotsavam	Ananda Valli	Cameo appearance	
2016	Kundanapu Bomma	Suchitra "Suchi"		
2017	Shamanthakamani	Madhu		
2017	Lie	Sathyam's proposed bride	Cameo appearance	
2018	Howrah Bridge	Swathi		
2018	Manu	Neela	Crowd funded film	
2020	Colour Photo	Deepthi	Released on Aha	
2020	Bombhaat	Chaitra	Released on Amazon Prime Video	
2021	Super Over	Madhu	Aha film	
2022	Sammathame	Saanvi		
2023	Saba Nayagan	Riya	Tamil film debut	
2024	Gaami	Jahnavi		
2024	Music Shop Murthy	Anjana		
2024	Yevam	SI Soumya		
2025	Daaku Maharaaj	Shivani		
2025	Santhana Prapthirasthu	Kalyani Chaganti		

=== Television ===
List of series and roles
Year	Title	Role	Network	Notes	Ref.
2019	Gods of Dharmapuri	Swapna	ZEE5		
2020	Masti's	Lekha	Aha		
2020	Shit Happens	Party girl	Aha	Guest appearance	
2021	Unheard	Padma	Disney+ Hotstar		
2022	Gaalivaana	Sravani	ZEE5		
2022–2023	Jhansi	Barbie	Disney+ Hotstar	2 Seasons	
2026	Katha Sudha	K. Satya Kumari	ETV Win	segment: Digital Death	

== Awards and nominations ==
Award	Year	Category	Work	Result	Ref.
Filmfare Awards South	2022	Best Actress – Telugu	Colour Photo	Nominated	
South Indian International Movie Awards	2021	Best Actress – Telugu	Colour Photo	Nominated	
