= Colour Photo =

2020 Indian film directed by Sandeep Raj

- Release poster
- Directed by: Sandeep Raj
- Screenplay by: Sandeep Raj
- Story by: Sai Rajesh Neelam
- Produced by: Sai Rajesh Neelam; Ravindra Benerjee Muppaneni (Benny)
- Starring: Suhas; Chandini Chowdary; Sunil
- Narrated by: Sandeep Raj
- Cinematography: Venkat R. Shakamuri
- Edited by: Kodati Pawan Kalyan
- Music by: Kaala Bhairava
- Production companies: Amrutha Productions; Loukya Entertainments
- Distributed by: Aha
- Release date: 23 October 2020
- Running time: 142 minutes
- Country: India
- Language: Telugu

Colour Photo is a 2020 Indian Telugu-language period romantic drama film directed by debutant Sandeep Raj. Produced by Amrutha Productions and Loukya Entertainment, the film stars Suhas in his first lead role, along with Chandini Chowdary, and Sunil. The music was composed by Kaala Bhairava, marking his second film as composer after Mathu Vadalara. The film is set in Machilipatnam, Andhra Pradesh in the mid-1990s and is said to be the story of a "below-average guy".

The film premiered on aha on 23 October 2020. The project includes many debutants who previously worked on short films, including the director of the film, Sandeep Raj. The film was shot completely in Machilipatnam, Vijayawada and the surrounding areas in Andhra Pradesh. At the 68th National Film Awards, it won the Best Feature Film in Telugu, and the state Gaddar Award for Second Best Feature Film.

== Plot ==
The film begins with Deepthi receiving the news of her father's death. She and her husband Chandu reach their village and meet their family. Ramaraju, Deepthi's brother and the local sub-inspector, tries to talk to her, but she shuts him down and goes to her ex Jayakrishna's house in his jeep. Her friend Padmaja accompanies her, and they spot a couple, Murali and Deepika arguing. Deepthi finds their issues very similar to her past with Jayakrishna, and narrates her story.

Jayakrishna, the son of a milkman, studies in the same college as Deepthi's. He once saw her rehearsing for a performance as a goddess, and fell in love with her. However, unlike Deepthi, he is dark skinned and from a poor economic background. Hence, he never expresses his feelings towards her. A year later, a few seniors rag Jayakrishna by tricking him into going to Deepthi's rehearsal and then beat him up for "teasing girls". Deepthi and her friends go to the principal and explain what truly happened, and Jayakrishna gets out of trouble. However, he starts avoiding them, as he does not want anyone to think badly. Deepthi confronts and proposes to Jayakrishna. On Jayakrishna's request, she accepts to keep their relationship a secret. With her encouragement, he beats up the seniors who beat him up and earns confidence and courage.

Unexpectedly, Padmaja and Jayakrishna's friend Bala Yesu "Balu" get to know about their relationship. They, too, accept to keep this a secret. Things go well for the couple until a fest, where the college principal denies Jayakrishna an opportunity to speak on the stage because of his skin tone. Jayakrishna feels insulted and gives a speech on the stage, criticising colour discrimination in front of the chief guest - a foreigner who does not understand Telugu and considers it a speech favouring engineering.

The principal, along with the seniors that have a grudge against him, decides to take revenge. On Deepthi's birthday, when Jayakrishna meets her in an empty class, the seniors lock the room and allege that the couple were having an amorous relationship. Ramaraju is angered and sends her away from the village. Jayakrishna is beaten up subsequently. However, as Deepthi arrives to collect her hall ticket, Jayakrishna shows up and leaves with her as Ramaraju is stuck in the college with their friends' help.

The couple feel encouraged and leave happily. Then, Padmaja and Deepthi recollect the actual happenings. Jayakrishna was beaten up, humiliated, and his certificates were burnt by Ramaraju, thus ensuring that he does not go to college and get a job in the future. He also killed Lakshmi, a calf Jayakrishna raised very dearly, naming it after his deceased mother, and cooked the calf into beef biryani and fed Jayakrishna, misleading him into thinking it was mutton biryani. When a shocked and devastated Jayakrishna came to know and retorted, Ramaraju broke his leg, leaving him lame.

Jayakrishna met Deepthi when she arrived to receive her hall ticket, and they decided to commit suicide together by consuming poison. Jayakrishna died on the spot, but Deepthi was rescued by Ramaraju. Balu was left devastated and lost his sanity. The film ends with Deepthi learning that no photo of Jayakrishna exists in the village, and she drawing his portrait, calling it the 'Colour Photo'.

== Cast ==
- Suhas as Jayakrishna alias Kittu, Kannaya
- Chandini Chowdary as Deepthi Varma alias Deepu
- Sunil as Inspector Rama Raju Varma, Deepthi's elder brother
- Harsha Chemudu as Bala Yesu alias Balu, Jayakrishna's friend
- Divya Sripada as Padmaja Sripada alias Paddu, Deepthi's friend
- Vidya Maharshi as Jyothi; Rama Raju's wife
- Sai Krishna Enreddy as College Principal
- Kancharapalem Raju as Jayakrishna's father
- Aadarsh Balakrishna as Chandu, Deepthi's husband
- R. K. Mallidi as Dharma
- Sri Krishna Paani as Paani
- Sneha Madhuri Sharma as Roja, Deepthi's friend
- Arun Kumar Pulavarthi as Murali
- Chandini Rao as Deepika
- PSN Murthy as Watchman
- Pandu Pulapaka as Peon
- Jaya Naidu as Deepthi and Rama Raju's mother
- Veerabhadra Rao as Deepthi and Rama Raju's father

== Production ==
=== Development ===
Director Sandeep Raj has already directed and was known for acting in few short films. In 2019, he decided to direct a small-budget film with his short films team. Most of the actors in the film were previously YouTubers and those who did few short films. In an interview, Raj said that he wants to direct films which have versatile story-telling.

=== Cast and crew ===
As a maker of short-films, I used to work with a small crew. But when it comes to a feature film, there would be 80-100 people on set at any given time. Many wouldn't even be aware of who is the film's director. I have learned how to manage people on set. It's important, like directorial skills.

— Sandeep Raj, Raagalahari

Sandeep Raj decided to feature the YouTubers he worked with. Chandini Chowdary already made her debut as a lead actress in Tollywood, also acted in few short films in early days. Suhas, the hero of the film is a good friend of Raj, also started his career from short films. Suhas also been as a comedian in many big Tollywood films. The director thus decided to cast these actors in leading roles. Actor Sunil was roped into the film as the main antagonist. Most of the other actors were also acted in few short films. In an interview Sandeep Raj revealed that Chandini Chowdary was not the first choice for the lead actress role, it is Niharika Konidela who was the first considered for the role. In an interview to Film Companion South, Suhas told that, "My hundred short films prepared me for feature films".

With the success of the music album of Mathu Vadalara, Sandeep chose Kaala Bhairava for the film's soundtrack and background score. The story is written by Sai Rajesh from his own incidents he faced. Debutant Venkat Shakamuri handled the cinematography of the film. Kranthi Priyam was chosen as the art director who previously worked in Agent Sai Srinivasa Athreya (2019).

=== Filming ===
Principal photography of the film started on 8 January 2020 in Hyderabad. The film was completely shot in Machilipatnam, Vijayawada and the surrounding parts. The story of the film also revolves around these places.

=== Post-production ===
By the end of March 2020, shooting of the film was almost done. Post-production was completed by mid-April.

== Themes and influences ==
The film's central theme revolves around colourism. It is based on real-life incidents of the film's story writer Sai Rajesh. A reviewer of TeluguCinema stated that the film is all about 'Colour'. He further added that Colour Photo deals with colourism, and boasts good dialogue writing. Despite tad slow-paced and dull initial portions, the latter half of the film has touching moments.

Another reviewer of GreatAndhra noted that "The genre of love stories has dealt with issues including casteism, and honor killings. What other new topics would a writer come up with for a conflict point for a love story? Here, Sai Rajesh has touched upon this issue of colourism. While this issue has not been dealt with much in our films, the proceedings have little novelty."

Sanat Kumar Malik of FastNewsFeeds wrote, "'It's 1999 and people still discriminate based on skin colour and caste,' rues Jayakrishna in Colour Photo. Oh well, in 2020, we still need the hashtag 'Black Lives Matter' and skin lightening creams continue to have many takers."

== Music ==
Colour Photo

Soundtrack album by Kaala Bhairava
- Released: 24 October 2020 (Jukebox)
- Recorded: 2020
- Studios: Studio 47; JB studios
- Genres: Feature film soundtrack, Romance
- Length: 14:23
- Language: Telugu
- Label: Aditya Music
- Producer: Kaala Bhairava

Kaala Bhairava chronology
Mathu Vadalara (2019)	Colour Photo (2020)	Thellavarithe Guruvaram (2021)
External audio
- Audio Jukebox on YouTube

The soundtrack and background score were scored by Kaala Bhairava and lyrics by Kittu Vissapragada and Sai Kiran. The audio was released on Aditya Music.

The first single ''Tharagathi Gadhi's'' lyrical version was released on Aditya Music on 27 August 2020. This single received good appreciation and is the most successful song among the album. Second single "Arere Akasam" was released on 21 September 2020. The third single ''Ekaantham's'' lyrical version was out on 7 October 2020.

Track listing
No.	Title	Lyrics	Singer(s)	Length
1.	"Tharagathi Gadhi"	Kittu Vissapragada	Kaala Bhairava	3:34
2.	"Arere Aaakasam"	Kittu Vissapragada	Anurag Kulkarni, Kaala Bhairava	3:23
3.	"Ekaantham"	Krishna Chaitanya	Ramya Behara	3:20
4.	"College Song"	Sai Kiran	Hema Chandra	2:42
5.	"Tharagathi Pathos"	Kittu Vissapragada	Kaala Bhairava	2:04
Total length:				14:23

=== Reception ===
The Hans India stated that ''Kaala Bhairava's music is a major asset for the movie. The songs are pleasant and the background score is impressive too.''

A reviewer wrote that "Kaala Bhairava is here to stay. Very often, we see music directors taking small films lightly. He has done an excellent job both with the songs and the background score."

== Release ==
Although the makers of the film initially wanted to the release the film in theaters, COVID-19 pandemic made them to opt for alternative sources. Finally, the producers of the film Sai Rajesh and Benny made a deal with OTT platform, Aha to release the film digitally. The producers and Allu Aravind announced the decision of releasing the film on Aha on 23 October 2020 on the eve of Vijayadasami festival.

== Reception ==
The Times of India critic Thadhagath Pathi gave 3.5/5 stars and wrote that "Colour Photo is a heart-wrenching love story that stays with you." Pathi praised the performances of the lead cast, in addition to music and other technical aspects. Sangeetha Devi Dundoo of The Hindu stated that Colour Photo deserves a pat on the back for going against the norms in Telugu cinema. Eenadu wrote that the film is "an impressive love story in parts." While appreciating the director for picking up a storyline based on colourism, the reviewer opined that he couldn't translate it well into the screenplay. The review also stated that the lead actors have performed well in their given roles. A reviewer from Sakshi praised the storyline, performances and the music but criticized the slow-paced screenplay.

Jahnavi Reddy of The News Minute wrote that the film ''The intersections of biases around skin colour, caste and race are extremely complex, and the film doesn't exactly do a perfect job addressing them". Baradwaj Rangan of Film Companion South stated that ''Colour Photo is one of the better products of this [direct-to-streaming] era.''

Murali Krishna CH of Cinema Express wrote that the dialogues and performance while pointing out there were some scenes.'' The Hans India gave 2.5/5 stars and stated that ''Sai Rajesh Neelam is the story writer of the movie. He penned an interesting love story with a routine conflict. The film goes well with a section of audiences because of too many predictable things that it offers.'' NTV wrote about the film that "Colour Photo [..] is a watchable love story with a touching climax", adding that the film didn't hanker go after low-hanging fruits, rather it showed courage of conviction and delivered some unconventional content. "

== Accolades ==
Award (Note: Awards, festivals and organizations are in alphabetical order.)	Date of ceremony (Note: Date is linked to the article about the awards held that year, wherever possible.)	Category	Recipient(s)	Result	Ref.
National Film Awards	2022	Best Feature Film in Telugu	Sai Rajesh Neelam; Sandeep Raj (director)	Won	
South Indian International Movie Awards	18–19 September 2021	Best Debut Producer – Telugu	Amrutha Productions, Loukys Entertainments	Won	
South Indian International Movie Awards	18–19 September 2021	Best Debut Director – Telugu	Sandeep Raj	Nominated	
South Indian International Movie Awards	18–19 September 2021	Best Actress – Telugu	Chandini Chowdary	Nominated	
South Indian International Movie Awards	18–19 September 2021	Best Actor in a Negative Role – Telugu	Sunil	Nominated	
South Indian International Movie Awards	18–19 September 2021	Best Comedian – Telugu	Harsha Chemudu	Nominated	
South Indian International Movie Awards	18–19 September 2021	Best Music Director – Telugu	Kaala Bhairava	Nominated	
South Indian International Movie Awards	18–19 September 2021	Best Lyricist – Telugu	Kittu Vissapragada – (for "Tharagathi Gadhi")	Nominated	
South Indian International Movie Awards	18–19 September 2021	Best Male Playback Singer – Telugu	Kaala Bhairava – (for "Tharagathi Gadhi")	Nominated	
South Indian International Movie Awards	18–19 September 2021	Best Female Playback Singer – Telugu	Ramya Behara – (for "Ekaantham")	Nominated	
