= Veerlapalem =

- village
- Country: India
- State: Andhra Pradesh
- District: Guntur District

Population (1100)
  - Total: 1,100

Languages
  - Official: Telugu
- Time zone: UTC+5:30 (IST)
- Postal code: 522305
- Vidhan Sabha constituency: Mangalagiri

Veerlapalem, is a major village in Duggirala mandal in Guntur district of Andhra Pradesh, South India.

== Geography ==
Veerlapalem lies on the south side of the river Krishna in Guntur Dist It is about 12 miles (19 km) south west from Vijayawada Repalle to vijayawada bus services available in vijayawada bustand and 17 miles (27 km) south to Tenali. It is in the historic southern route from Vijayawada to Repalle along with River Krishna and is bounded on its south side by the Pedapalem route and on the west by road Connected to Nuthakki Village.

== History ==
We are located 10 miles (16 km) from Vijayawada Railway Station, Krishna River. Veerlapalem is known for its rich cultural and literary legacy. There is a famous temple in Veerlapalem village (approximately 100 years old) Ramalayam Temple and Ganganamma Thalli temple . It is surrounded by nature and green fields. Famous festival celebrated here is Sri Ram Navmi

== Demographics ==
The total population is about 1000. The population divides by age group roughly into: 25% aged 18 and under, 50% aged between 18 and 60, 25% aged 60 or over.

== Education ==
The primary and secondary school education is imparted by government, aided and private schools, under the School Education Department of the state. There are no student enrollment in any school of the village.
