= Fight Maha =

- Theatrical release poster
- Directed by: Anand Chandra
- Written by: Anand Chandra
- Produced by: Alluri Venkata Subba Raju; R. Kumar Raju; Anand Chandra
- Starring: Sunil; Akhilraj Uddemari; Sreevani Gopichand; Vaishnavi Kotla; Siddarth Sidda; Srikanth Iyengar; Sameer Hasan
- Cinematography: Nani Ainavilli
- Edited by: Anandh Pawan
- Music by: Vasanth Isaipettai
- Production company: New Eye Movies LLP
- Release date: 21 August 2026
- Running time: 117 minutes
- Country: India
- Language: Telugu

Fight Maha is a 2026 Indian Telugu-language psychological thriller film written and directed by Anand Chandra. It stars Sunil and Akhilraj Uddemari in the lead role, with Sreevani Gopichand, Vaishnavi Kotla, Siddarth Sidda, Srikanth Iyengar, Sameer Hasan and Santhi Kumar in other roles.

The film was produced by Alluri Venkata Subba Raju, R. Kumar Raju and Anand Chandra under the banner of New Eye Movies LLP. Cinematography was handled by Nani Ainavilli and editing by Anandh Pawan.

The story follows Maha, a sketch artist working with the police, whose sleepwalking problem becomes connected to the murder of his former girlfriend.

Fight Maha was released in theatres on 21 August 2026.

== Plot ==
Maha hails from Visakhapatnam. He lives with his mother who is a school teacher and his younger sister. He lost his father at a young age of six. Even though he cannot recall his father, Maha frequently sees his father in nightmares. With time, Maha begins sleepwalking, which persists throughout his adulthood. Maha manages to complete his BTech degree but wishes to be an artist. The mother objects the decision of her son, as she feels that painting will not provide any stable career to him. Finally, Maha informs his mother that he has been able to find a job in Hyderabad and moves out of his house for pursuing his interest in arts.

Maha faces difficulties after moving to Hyderabad, and therefore takes up a job of a sketch artist in the police station. Due to his talent of observing people and drawing accurate pictures, he becomes helpful to the police in many ways. Other than making sketches of suspects, he gives clues to investigators to solve cases.His career seems to be successful, but his sleepwalking persists. Sometimes Maha falls asleep at one place and wakes up in another place without even knowing how did he get there.His life becomes troublesome, as he encounters his ex-girlfriend Jessie living in the adjacent apartment. They had parted on bad terms, and now their encounter has adversely affected Maha's mental health.

Eventually, Maha pays a visit to the psychiatrist, Dr Aditya Gupta. He explains that sleepwalking may make a person carry out certain activities during sleep, without even being conscious of it. One night, Maha has a dream where he kills Jessie. Upon waking up, Maha finds out that he is inside Jessie's house and that she is dead. Maha is scared but he does not remember what happened. Maha does not know if he committed the crime while sleeping or some other man did and therefore he decides to leave the place.

The police start investigating the murder case. Soon Maha is asked to make a sketch of the murder suspect. It places Maha in a unique situation because now he starts wondering if the person he should draw is him. Maha decided to investigate the case himself and soon during the investigation Maha starts finding things about his own childhood and death of his father. Maha's sleepwalking and nightmares about his father and about the murder start getting together.

== Cast ==
- Sunil as Vasudev
- Akhilraj Uddemari as Maha
- Sreevani Gopichand as Amina
- Vaishnavi Kotla as Jessie
- Siddarth Sidda
- Srikanth Iyengar as Dr Aditya Gupta
- Sameer Hasan as CI Krishna Kumar
- Santhi Kumar as HC Purnachander
- Jogi Raju as Ravi

== Production ==
Fight Maha was written and directed by Anand Chandra and produced by Alluri Venkata Subba Raju, R. Kumar Raju and Anand Chandra under New Eye Movies LLP.

The film was shot in Visakhapatnam, Kerala and Hyderabad. The makers described Fight Maha as a psychological thriller centred on sleepwalking, dreams, destiny, guilt and hidden truths. Anand Chandra said that the title refers to the protagonist Maha's continuing struggle with the difficulties in his life.

The film's technical crew includes cinematographer Nani Ayyavelli, editor Anand Pawan, production designer Devara Madhukar, music composer Vasanth Isaipettai and lyricist Sriram Tapasvi.

== Soundtrack ==
The music was composed by Vasanth Isaipettai, with lyrics by Sriram Tapasvi. The songs feature vocals by Sruthi Mantena and Srinivas M.

The soundtrack consists of three songs:

Song	Singers	Lyrics
Edho Edho Avuthundhe	Sruthi Mantena, Srinivas M	Sriram Tapasvi
It's So High	Sruthi Mantena, Srinivas M	Sriram Tapasvi
Nanne Vodilesi Poke	Sruthi Mantena, Srinivas M	Sriram Tapasvi

== Release ==
Fight Maha was released theatrically on 21 August 2026. The Central Board of Film Certification certified the film A (Adults Only) on 24 November 2025. The official CBFC record lists the certificate number as DIL/3/75/2025-HYD and the certified length as 117.13 minutes.

The film was announced for a worldwide theatrical release on 21 August 2026. The teaser was released by filmmaker Ram Gopal Varma, and the theatrical trailer was released before the film's theatrical run.

== Reception ==
Fight Maha received reviews from several Telugu entertainment publications following its release.

Telugu Times gave the film a rating of 2.75/5 and described it as a psychological thriller exploring dreams, disorder and destiny.

Zee News Telugu gave the film a rating of 2.75/5.

Reviews were also published by The Hans India, NTV Telugu and News18 Telugu following the film's release.
