= Sunil (actor) =

Indian actor (born 1974)

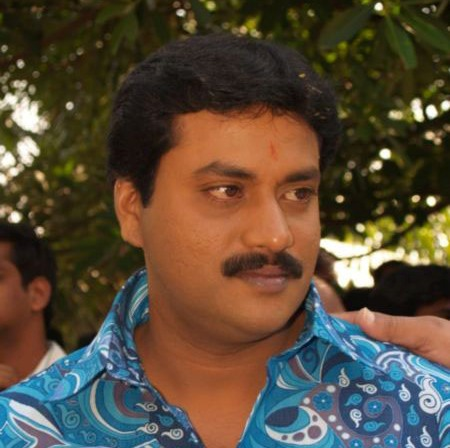
- Born: Indukuri Sunil Varma; 28 February 1974 (age 52); Bhimavaram, Andhra Pradesh, India
- Occupations: Actor; comedian
- Years active: 1996–present
- Works: Full list
- Spouse: Sruthi (m. 2002)
- Children: 2

Indukuri Sunil Varma (born 28 February 1974), known mononymously as Sunil, is an Indian actor primarily known for his work in Telugu films, with occasional appearances in Tamil and Malayalam films. He has appeared in over 180 films, predominantly in comedic roles, and has received three Nandi Awards and two Filmfare Awards South. During the 2000s, he was regarded as one of Telugu cinema's leading comedians, recognised for his distinctive laugh and comedic timing.

Sunil transitioned to lead roles with Andala Ramudu (2006) and went on to star in several commercially successful films, including Maryada Ramanna (2010), Poola Rangadu (2012), and Tadakha (2013). However, his career saw a decline in the late 2010s as his focus on lead roles resulted in multiple unsuccessful films. In recent years, he experienced a resurgence by taking on versatile supporting roles, antagonistic roles, and returning to comedic roles. He played an antagonist in commercially successful films such as Colour Photo (2020), Pushpa: The Rise (2021), and its sequel Pushpa 2: The Rule (2024). His Tamil film credits include Maaveeran (2023), Mark Antony (2023), Good Bad Ugly (2025) and Fight Maha.

== Career ==
Sunil started his career in 1996 as an extra in the film Akkada Ammayi Ikkada Abbayi. However, his scenes did not make it to the final cut of the film. His career began on a slow note with movies like Second Hand (which was stopped from production), and Peruleni Cinema. Prema Katha and Swayamvaram were his first real opportunities in the industry. Pape Naa Pranam was the first film he acted in. Nuvve Kavali was the first film to give him recognition.

In 2010, Sunil starred in S. S. Rajamouli-directed Maryada Ramanna, which was a commercial success. A reviewer from Sify noted that: "Sunil would no longer look like a comedy hero. His dances are simply superb."

Sunil was then cast in the lead role in Poola Rangadu, directed by Veerabhadram Chowdary which was released across 450 theatres worldwide. The film received positive reviews. He was the antagonist in the film Colour Photo (2020), which brought him critical acclaim.

The 2021 film Pushpa: The Rise saw Sunil in an unusual role of a serious gangster Mangalam Seenu, very different from the comedy roles he usually plays. The success of the film brought him many offers to play negative roles and he starred in the Tamil film Maaveeran (2023).

== Personal life ==
Sunil hails from Bhimavaram of Andhra Pradesh, India. Sunil celebrated his 40th birthday for a noble cause donating to a blind school and spending time with them.

Director Trivikram Srinivas and Sunil have been friends since their days in Bhimavaram. They, along with director Gunasekhar, were roommates in Punjagutta during their struggling days. As of 2016, Trivikram rents the room as a memory.

== Accolades ==
=== Filmfare Awards South ===
- Best Comedian – Telugu – Peda Babu (2004)
- Best Supporting Actor - Telugu – Tadakha (2013)

=== Nandi Awards ===
- Best Male Comedian – Nuvvu Nenu (2001)
- Best Male Comedian – Andhrudu (2005)
- Special Jury Award – Maryada Ramanna (2010)

=== South Indian International Movie Awards ===
- SIIMA Award for Best Supporting Actor (Telugu) – Tadakha (2013)

=== Santosham Film Awards ===
- Santosham Best Comedian Award - Aravinda Sametha Veera Raghava (2018)
