= Mime Madhu =

Indian actor (born 1977)

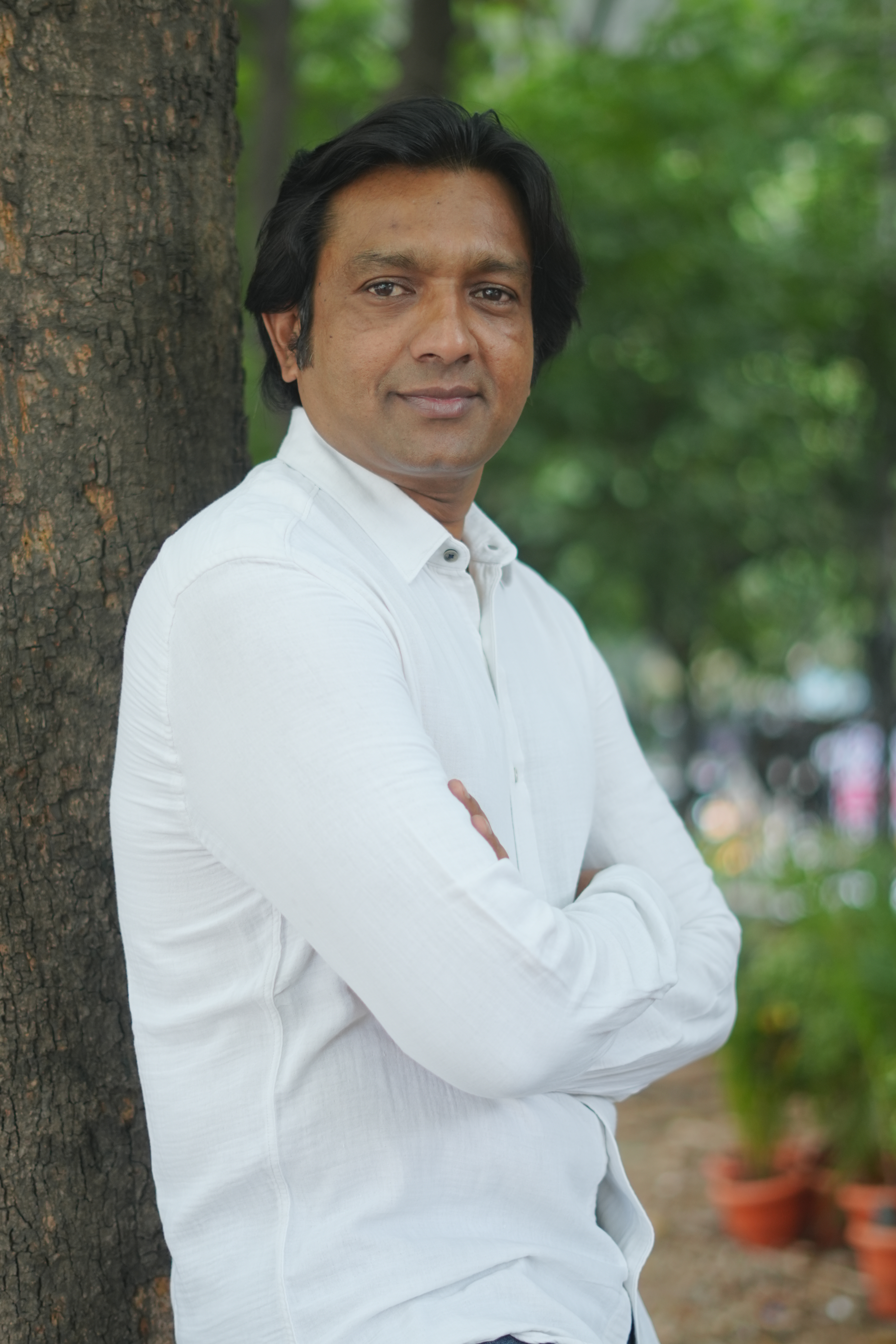
- Born: Arusam Madhusudhan; 16 October 1977 (age 48); Hanamkonda, Andhra Pradesh, India (now in Telangana, India)
- Education: University of Hyderabad
- Occupations: Actor, Mime Trainer
- Spouse: Sabrina Anastasio (m. 2016)
- Children: Lalitha Rose
- Parent(s): Odelu, Vinodha
- Website: www.indianmimeacademy.com

Arusam Madhusudan, popularly known as Mime Madhu, is an actor known for his work in Telugu films and mime trainer. He won Ustad Bismillah Khan Sangeeth Nataka Academy Award in 2007, Nandi Award for Best Actor in theater in 2002.

== Early life ==
Madhu was born on 6 October 1977 in Hanamkonda, India to Odelu and his wife Vinodha. He done M.P.A (Master of Performing Arts) at the Sarojini Naidu School of Performing Arts, University of Hyderabad. Madhu is married to Sabrina Anastasio, classical dancer-turned-puppeteerin 2016 and They have a daughter Lalitha Rose.

== Filmography ==
=== Film ===
Year	Title	Role(s)
2021	Aakashavaani	Rangadu
2021	Gaali Sampath	Mahankali
2022	Chor Bazaar	
2023	Balagam	Mogilayya
2024	Ooru Peru Bhairavakona	
2024	Nindha	Krishna Kanth
2024	Saripodhaa Sanivaaram	Villager
2024	Keshava Chandra Ramavath	Bheemla Nayak
2025	Eesha	Punyavathi

=== Television ===
Year	Title	Role	Network
2006	Chakravakam	Ganesh	Gemini TV
2008	Mogali Rekulu	Shiva Ram	Gemini TV
2013	Sravana Sameeralu	Vishal	Gemini TV
