= Baahubali: The Beginning (soundtrack) =

2015 soundtrack album by M. M. Keeravani

- Telugu album cover

Soundtrack album by M. M. Keeravani
- Released: 2014
- Recorded: 2014
- Genre: Feature Film Soundtrack
- Length: 27:08
- Languages: Telugu; Tamil
- Labels: Lahari Music; T-Series Manorama Music (Malayalam) Zee Music Company (Hindi)
- Producer: M. M. Keeravani

M. M. Keeravani chronology
Baby (2015)	Baahubali: The Beginning (2014)	Size Zero (2015)

Baahubali: The Beginning is the soundtrack of the 2015 Indian Telugu-Tamil bilingual film of the same name. The soundtrack album was composed by M. M. Keeravani and was released in 2014.

== Production ==
Rajamouli's cousin and his norm composer M. M. Keeravani composed the music for this film. After the break taken by the film's team after completion of war schedule on 5 February 2014, an official statement from the film's team stated that Keeravani is recording two songs from the film right now. Madhan Karky was selected as the lyricist for the Tamil version of the soundtrack. For the song, "Sivuni Aana" after the pallavi, the subsequent lyrics are mostly in Sanskrit whereas in the Tamil version "Siva Sivaya Potri" the lines are all in Tamil. On 2 July 2014, the film's official website published that Keeravani is recording a song at Prasad Studios in Hyderabad which is sung by Deepu. On 28 October 2014, Keeravani told Deccan Chronicle that the writers are working on the lyrics of the songs and he would start working on them in a week's time. During the film's shoot in Bulgaria, the film's soundtrack was expected to be unveiled in February 2015. Lahari Music acquired the audio rights in early May 2015 for an amount of ₹30 million and the audio is accessible from YouTube. The team of Baahubali announced that the audio launch of the movie will take place in Sri Venkateswara University grounds, Tirupati on the official page of the movie on Twitter. The album also released in Hindi and Malayalam languages.

The film has eight tracks composed by M. M. Keeravani. The music was launched on 31 May 2015. Lyrics for the three songs were penned by Inaganti Sundar and Ananta Sriram, Ramajogayya Sastry, K Shiva Shakti Datta and Chaitanya Prasad were written one each while Aditya and Noel Sean wrote the lyrics for the last song. The music rights for the Tamil, Telugu and Malayalam versions of the soundtrack were acquired by T-Series, Lahari Music and Manorama Music while Zee Music Company bought the audio rights of the Hindi version of soundtrack.

== Track listing ==
Telugu
No.	Title	Lyrics	Singer(s)	Length
1.	"Mamatala Talli"	K Shiva Shakti Datta	Satya Yamini, Chorus	4:04
2.	"Jeeva Nadhi"	Inaganti Sundar	Geetha Madhuri	1:55
3.	"Dhivara"	Ramajogayya Sastry	Ramya Behara, Deepu	5:43
4.	"Sivuni Aana (Note: The song does not contain lip movement, with the ending dialogue shot in both languages.)"	Inaganti Sundar	M. M. Keeravani, Mounima	3:32
5.	"Pacha Bottasi (Note: The song was originally filmed in Telugu, with many parts re-shot in Tamil.)"	Ananta Sriram	Karthik, Damini Bhatla	4:33
6.	"Manohari"	Chaitanya Prasad	Mohana Bhogaraju, LV Revanth	3:52
7.	"Nippulaa Swasa Ga"	Inaganti Sundar	M. M. Keeravani	3:26
8.	"Dhivara" (English version)	Aditya, Noel Sean	Ramya Behara, Aditya	3:26
Total length:				27:08

All tracks are written by Madhan Karky.

Tamil
No.	Title	Singer(s)	Length
1.	"Pachchai Thee"	Karthik, Damini Bhatla	4:33
2.	"Jeeva Nadhi"	Geetha Madhuri	1:55
3.	"Deerane"	Ramya Behara, Deepu	5:43
4.	"Irul Konda Vaanil"	Deepika	4:04
5.	"Moochile Theeyumaay"	Kailash Kher	3:26
6.	"Manogari"	Haricharan, Mohana Bhogaraju	3:52
7.	"Siva Sivaya Potri"	M. M. Keeravani, Vaikom Vijayalakshmi	3:32
8.	"Theerane" (English version)	Ramya Behara, Aditya	3:26
Total length:			27:08

All tracks are written by Mankombu Gopalakrishnan.

Malayalam
No.	Title	Singer(s)	Length
1.	"Aarivan Aarivan"	Vaikom Vijayalakshmi, M M Keeravani	3:48
2.	"Irul Thingum Vaanil"	Yamini	1:55
3.	"Manohari"	Sayanora, Vijay Yesudas	3:52
4.	"Njan Chendena"	Swetha Mohan, Vijay Yesudas	5:31
5.	"Pacha Theeyanu Nee"	Swetha Mohan, Vijay Yesudas	3:17
6.	"Punnara Kanavine"	Geetha Madhuri, Chorus	4:19
7.	"Theekanal Swasamayi"	Sachin Warrier	5:32
Total length:			25:31

All tracks are written by Manoj Muntashir.

Hindi
No.	Title	Singer(s)	Length
1.	"Mamta Se Bhari"	Bombay Jayashree, chorus	3:49
2.	"Jal Rahin Hain"	Kailash Kher	3:20
3.	"Swapn Sunehere"	Bombay Jayashree, Swetha Raj	1:40
4.	"Khoya Hain"	Kaala Bhairava, Neeti Mohan	5:31
5.	"Kaun Hain Voh"	Kailash Kher, Mounima	3:17
6.	"Panchhi Bole"	M. M. Keeravani, Palak Muchhal	4:19
7.	"Manohari"	Divya Kumar, Neeti Mohan	3:36
Total length:			25:37

== Critical reception ==
The Times of India rated the album 4 out of 5 stating, "The album relies heavily on classical instrumentation and is highly impressive".
