= List of programmes broadcast by Sun Gemini =

Indian television series

This is a list of television programs current broadcasts and former broadcasts by Indian television channel Sun Gemini formerly known as (GeminiTV).

== Current broadcast ==
Premiere date	Series	Adaptation of
19 August 2024	Ammakku Prematho	
18 August 2025	Sathya	Dubbed Version of Tamil TV series Aadukalam
12 October 2026	Naa Friend Charu	Bilingual Version of Kannada TV series Gelathi Gayathiri
8 January 2024	Kothaga Rekkalochana	
24 November 2025	Srimathi Annapurna Catering	
23 March 2026	Mukkera Meenakshi	Bilingual Version of Kannada TV series Mooguthi Malli
15 June 2026	Kusthi Kalyani	
22 September 2025	Sri Hari Kalyanam	Tamil TV series Lakshmi
30 September 2024	Moodu Mullu	Tamil TV series Moondru Mudhichu
25 March 2024	Sivangi	Tamil TV series Singapennae
9 December 2024	Constable Manju	Marathi TV series Constable Manju

== Former broadcasts ==
Year(s)	Serial name	Ref
2024–2026	Maa Inti Devatha	
2024–2026	Abhinandana	
2024–2026	Bhairavi	
2022–2024	Uppena	
2023–2024	Anu Ane Nenu	
2024–2026	Sivangi	
2023–2024	Geethanjali	
2020–2024	Thaali	
2022–2024	Saadhana	
2022–2023	Nethra	
2021–2023	Kanyadanam	
2018–2021	Bandham	
2020–2021	Girija Kalyanam	
2018–2021	Pournami	
2020–2021	Bangaru Kodalu	
2018–2020	Rendu Rellu Aaru	
2019–2020	Roja	
2019–2020	Madhumasam	
2019–2020	Subhadra Parinayam	
2019–2020	Kalyani	
2019–2020	Abhilasha	
2017–2019	Matrudevobhava	
2019	Lakshmi Stores	
2012–2017	Agni Poolu	
2009–2011	Sundarakanda	
2007–2008	Mudda Mandharam	
2008–2010	Sakthi	
2007–2009	Anjali	
2008–2013	Mogali Rekulu	
2004–2005	Nanna	
2003–2008	Chakravakam	
2002–2006	Nagamma	
2001–2007	Amrutham	
2005–2008	Kasthuri	

=== Other serials ===
- Aanandam
- Nandini
- Chandrakumari
- Ganga Yamuna Saraswati
- Krishnadasi
- Madhubala
- Kalasam
- Kuthuru
- Aanandam
- Aladdin
- Sai baba
- Maya
- Vani Rani
- Naagini
- Aladdin

== Reality shows ==
Year	Show name	Ref
2021	Evaru Meelo Koteeswarulu	
2021	MasterChef India – Telugu Season 1	
2021	No.1 Yaari with Rana - Season 3	
2018 - 2019	Rangasthalam	
2018 - 2019	Kalyana Lakshmi	
2018	No.1 Yaari with Rana - Season 2	
2018	Memu Saitham - Season 2	
2017	No.1 Yaari with Rana - Season1	
2017	Rachabanda	
2016	Memu Saitham - Season 1	
2014	Akshay Kumar's Sahasaveerulu	
