= Ravi Krishna =

Ravi Krishna may refer to:

- Ravi Krishna (actor, born 1983), Tamil and Telugu film actor
- Ravi Krishna (actor, born 1989), Telugu film and television actor
