= Ashmita Karnani =

Indian actor (b. 1980)

- Born: Rajasthan
- Occupation: Actor
- Known for: Telugu TV serials

Ashmita Karnani (born Rajasthan) is an Indian artist and actress. She mostly works in Telugu serials. She acted in more than 15 serials and films in the Telugu film industry. She made her television debut in a Telugu serial called Padmavyuham and also acted in films such as Murari, Appudappudu, Madhumasam, Athidhi, Aapadhamokkulavaadu, and Collector Gari Bharya. She also appeared in commercials.

== Early life ==
Karnani was born in Rajasthan in 1981. She is married to choreographer Sudhir. She started a YouTube channel named Ashtrixx in 2017 whose topics include skin care, hair care, and daily vlogs....

== TV serials ==
TV Serial	Role	Channel
Padmavyuham	Gowri & Chamundeswari	ETV Telugu
Chandramukhi		ETV Telugu
Toorpu Padamara		ETV Telugu
Madhuram		
Nishabdham		
Meghasandhesam		Gemini TV
Akasaganga		ETV Telugu
Muddu Bidda		Zee Telugu
Ashta Chamma		
Manasu Mamatha		ETV Telugu
Sravana Sameeralu	Radha	Gemini TV
Ranivaasam	Writer	Gemini TV
Seetha Mahalakshmi	Malini Devi	Star Maa
Agnisakshi	Bhairavi	Star Maa
Madhumasam	Bhanumathi	Gemini TV

== Filmography ==
Year	Film names	Role
2001	Murari	
2001	6 Teens	Mary
2003	Appudappudu	
2007	Madhumasam	Hamsa's friend
2007	Athidhi	Amritha's mother
2008	Aapadhamokkulavaadu	
2010	Collector Gari Bharya	
2014	Emo Gurram Egaravachu	Neelaveni's aunt
2017	Om Namo Venkatesaya	Bhudevi
2017	Katamarayudu	Alivelu
