= Gaali Sampath =

2021 film directed by Anish R. Krishna

- Theatrical release poster
- Directed by: Anish R. Krishna
- Screenplay by: Anil Ravipudi
- Story by: S. Krishna
- Produced by: S. Krishna; Harish Peddi; Sahu Garapati
- Starring: Rajendra Prasad Sree Vishnu Lovely Singh
- Cinematography: Sai Sriram
- Edited by: Tammiraju
- Music by: Achu Rajamani
- Production companies: Imagespark Entertainment; Shine Screens
- Release date: 11 March 2021
- Country: India
- Language: Telugu

Gaali Sampath (transl. "Wind" Sampath) is a 2021 Indian Telugu-language survival drama film directed by Anish R. Krishna, from a screenplay by Anil Ravipudi. The film stars Rajendra Prasad, Sree Vishnu, and Lovely Singh. Tanikella Bharani, and Satya play supporting roles. Prasad and Vishnu portray a father-son duo. The music is composed by Achu Rajamani.

Upon release, on 11 March 2021, the film opened to mixed reviews and was a commercial failure at the box office.

== Plot ==
The film begins at Araku, where a dumb Sampath only makes noises, so everyone calls him Gaali Sampath. He resides with his son Suri, a truck driver who is above all else and nurtures him attentively since he suffers from a respiratory problem. Sampath detests the rain and curses whenever it falls as the prime cause of ruins throughout his life. He aims to become an artist and chases a drama company proprietor, Veerabhadram, for a single shot, but in vain. Amidst this, Suri falls in love with the Sarpanch's daughter, Papa, and convinces her father to knit his love interest after settling in life. Hence, Suri plans to buy a truck for which he outlawed takes ₹500,000 (US$5,200) cash from a bank manager, Haribabu, who promises to return in a week and stores it at home.

Simultaneously, Sampath takes the first step to participate in a drama competition but has to bribe ₹500,000 (US$5,200) to Veerabhadram. Sampath guides Suri's buddy, Gagan, a bend in his love affair to gain that amount. Fortuitously, the girl is no one else, Papa, when Gagan sabotages Suri's alliance by asking Sampath to create a stir. He does accordingly, incognizant of his son's endearment. Anyhow, Gagan backstabs Sampath by denying providing the amount. Whereat, Sampath heists his son's needs, hoping to repay him after winning the competition with ₹800,000 (US$8,300) prize money.

Sampath gives a tremendous performance of mime that one unable to feed his baby due to poverty receives vast applause. The same day, Suri learns all his father's subverts on him and quits by accusing him of dying. Devastated, Sampath attempts self-sacrifice when the rain drops, which he swears, and slips into a deserted well in their backyard. At that point, Suri is conscious of Sampath's real intentions & sacrifices by his father's best friend, Station Master. Indeed, Sampath is a famous Radio Jockey who got an excellent opportunity to mold as an actor, which he relinquished because of his son's ill health. Sampath also lost his wife & his voice in an accident on a rainy day. On that ground, he loathes it.

Thus, Suri is remorseful and makes a long quest for his father, but it is fruitless. However, the Sarpach offers Papa's hand to move on with his life by disposing of Sampath, but Suri rejects, proclaiming his father's eminence. Overhearing it, Sampath determines to get out of the well. Alongside his enormous spirit, Sampath progresses, but tragically, nearing the brim, he loses grip as it rains. Suddenly, Suri goes into a panic attack and gasps for air, while Sampath realizes that the heavy rain is aiding him in climbing the well. Although injured, he provides medication to Suri and passes out of exhaustion from his attempt to escape the well. At last, Sampath wins the first prize, uses it to buy a new truck for Suri, and joins him with Papa. Finally, the movie ends happily with rain, which Sampath jollity enjoys, showing his latest take on life.

== Cast ==
- Rajendra Prasad as Gaali Sampath
- Sree Vishnu as Suri, Gaali Sampath's son
- Lovely Singh as Papa, Suri's love interest
- Tanikella Bharani as Station Master, Gaali Sampath's friend
- Satya as Gaali Sampath's Translator
- Raghu Babu as Veerabhadram
- Anish Kuruvilla as Bank Auditor
- Srikanth Iyyengar as Haribabu
- Rajitha as Haribabu's wife
- Srinivasa Reddy as Driver
- Mirchi Kiran
- Gagan Vihari
- Sreenivas Sai
- Mime Madhu
- Surendra Reddy
- Karate Kalyani as Pankajam
- Rajasree Nair as Gaali Sampath's wife and Suri's mother
- Rupalakshmi
- Sujatha Simhadri

== Production ==
The film was announced in October 2020. Later, the film was launched and muhurat shot was filmed on 16 November 2020 at Ramanaidu Studios in Hyderabad, India. Principal photography of the film began in the same month. Most of the scenes were shot in Uttarandhra region of Andhra Pradesh. S. Krishna wrote the story and co-produced the film while Anil Ravipudi scripted the film and supervised the direction department.

== Release ==
The film was theatrically released on 11 March 2021. Gaali Sampath was released digitally though Aha and Amazon Prime on 19 March 2021.

== Reception ==
The Indian Express critic Gabetta Ranjith Kumar stated that the characterisation and Rajendra Prasad's portrayal of Gaali Sampath are the positive aspects of the film. Y. Sunitha Chowdhary of The Hindu felt that film was not engaging enough and wrote "Loud characters become a liability in this survival drama."

A reviewer from The Hans India gave a positive review for the film, writing that "Gaali Sampath is a first of its kind attempt in Telugu cinema and has been executed perfectly." Jalapathy Gudelli in his review for Sify concluded that "Rajendra Prasad’s strong performance and Sree Vishnu’s acting are the only good parts. Lame writing and old-school narration have diluted the emotional angle of the film."
