= Dhandoraa =

2025 Indian Telugu film by Muralikanth Devasoth

- Theatrical release poster
- Directed by: Muralikanth Devasoth
- Written by: Muralikanth Devasoth
- Produced by: Ravindra Benerjee Muppaneni (Benny)
- Starring: Sivaji; Bindu Madhavi; Navdeep; Nandu; Ravi Krishna; Manika Chikkala; Mounika Reddy
- Cinematography: Venkat R. Shakamuri
- Edited by: Srujana Adusumilli
- Music by: Mark K Robin
- Production company: Loukya Entertainments
- Release date: 25 December 2025
- Running time: 135 minutes
- Country: India
- Language: Telugu

Dhandoraa is a 2025 Indian Telugu-language periodical drama film written and directed by Muralikanth Devasoth and produced by Ravindra Benerjee Muppaneni (Benny), under Loukya Entertainments. The film has an ensemble cast of Sivaji, Bindu Madhavi, Navdeep, Nandu, Ravi Krishna, Manika Chikkala and Mounika Reddy.

Shot extensively in Telangana, it was released on 25 December 2025.

== Cast ==
- Sivaji as Sivaji
- Bindu Madhavi as Sreelatha
- Navdeep as the Village Sarpanch Seetharam
- Nandu as Vishnu
- Ravi Krishna as Ravi
- Manika Chikkala as Sujatha
- Mounika Reddy as Vanitha "Vinny", Vishnu's wife
- Raadhya as Sujatha, Sreelatha's daughter
- Muralidhar Goud as Babai
- Kamal as Ranga
- Edward Stevenson Pereji as Lawyer
- Rajasekhar Aningi as Subba Reddy
- Aditi Bhavaraju as Shwetha
- Bhaskar Manyam as Prathap Reddy
- Meesam Suresh as Sundar
- Sattanna as Aashayya
- Jabardasth Apparao as Customer
- Gaddam Naveen as Owner
- Kommidi Vishwender Reddy as MLA Ramana Chowdary
- Devi Prasad as Rajaram, Vishnu's father
- Sharath Barigela as Mutthi

== Music ==
The background score and songs were composed by Mark K Robin.

Track listing
No.	Title	Lyrics	Singer(s)	Length
1.	"Pilla"	Purnachary Challury	Aditi Bhavaraju, Anurag Kulkarni	3:04
2.	"Dhandoraa Title Song"	Kasarla Shyam	Anthony Daasan, Mark K Robin	3:48
3.	"Parichayam Avakunda"	Sri Mani	Sri Krishna, Harini Ivaturi	3:38
4.	"Vibe Of Seetharam"			1:32

== Release and reception ==
Dhandoraa was released on 25 December 2025. Post-theatrical digital streaming rights were acquired by Amazon Prime Video and was released on 14 January 2026 coinciding with Sankranthi.

Praising the lead cast performances and screenplay, Srivathsan Nadadhur of The Hindu gave a positive review. Shreya Varanasi of The Times of India rated it 3 out of 5 and called writing as one of the film's strengths. Echoing the same, Suresh Kavirayani of Cinema Express too gave the same rating and further praised the music and cinematography. The Hans India stated, "Dhandoraa stands as an honest, impactful film that resonates through its performances, intent, and socially conscious storytelling". T Maruthi Acharya of India Today praised the character design, writing, film score and the performances of the lead cast.
