= The 100 (film) =

Indian Telugu-language film by Raghav Omkar Sasidhar

- Theatrical release poster
- Directed by: Raghav Omkar Sasidhar
- Written by: Raghav Omkar Sasidhar
- Produced by: Ramesh Karutoori; Venki Pushadapu; J. Tharak Ram
- Starring: Sagar; Misha Narang; Dhanya Balakrishna
- Cinematography: Shyam K. Naidu
- Edited by: Amar Reddy Kudumula
- Music by: Harshavardhan Rameshwar
- Production companies: Kria Film Corp; Dhamma Productions
- Release date: 11 July 2025
- Running time: 135 minutes
- Country: India
- Language: Telugu

The 100 is a 2025 Indian Telugu-language action crime thriller film written and directed by Raghav Omkar Sasidhar. The film features Sagar, Misha Narang and Dhanya Balakrishna in important roles.

The film was released on 11 July 2025.

== Plot ==
The story begins with the suicide of Madhu Priya, a young woman who ends her life following a serious argument with her boyfriend, Sameer, an ethical hacker. Around the same time, Vikrant, an IPS officer in his probationary period who opposes police encounters, is assigned to a case involving a series of robberies and murders on the outskirts of Hyderabad.

During the early stages of the investigation, Vikrant encounters Aarthi, a courageous and outspoken woman whose attitude leaves a strong impression on him. However, their next meeting reveals a very different Aarthi—silent and withdrawn. After taking charge as Assistant Commissioner of Police, Vikrant makes significant progress in solving the robbery case and recovers a cache of stolen jewellery. Among the items, he identifies a piece belonging to Aarthi, which prompts him to investigate a traumatic incident from her past.

As Vikrant begins connecting the threads, a disturbing truth starts to emerge. What initially appears to be a series of unrelated crimes slowly unravels into a complex web linking Madhu Priya, Aarthi, and her father. Small yet significant clues drive Vikrant closer to a hidden conspiracy with far-reaching consequences.

"The 100" is a suspense-driven thriller that explores themes of trauma, justice, and resilience. The title itself takes on deeper meaning as Vikrant's investigation reveals not just the truth behind individual tragedies, but a larger commentary on systemic silence and accountability.

== Cast ==
- Sagar as Vikranth
- Misha Narang as Aarthi
- Dhanya Balakrishna as Vidya
- Anand
- Kalyani Natarajan
- Vishnu Priya as Madhu
- Lakshmi Gopala Swamy
- Balakrishna
- Jayanth
- Tarak Ponnappa
- Vamsiraj Nekkanti
- Vajja Venkata Giridhar
- Temper Vamsi

== Music ==
The soundtrack and background score is composed by Harshavardhan Rameshwar.

Track listing
No.	Title	Lyrics	Singer(s)	Length
1.	"Aakaasame"	Rambabu Gosala	Karthik	2:46
2.	"Hey Meghale"	Sri Harsha Emani	L. V. Revanth, Sahithi Chaganti	3:15
3.	"Kanule Kalise"	Chaithanya Prasad	Sameera Bhardwaj	3:43
4.	"Srunkhalalu Vidi"	Kalyan Charavarthy Tripuraneni	Arun Kaundinya, Lokeshwar Edara, Kavya Chandhana, Lakshmi Meghana	3:03

== Release and reception ==
The 100 was released on 11 July 2025.

Avad Mohammad of OTTplay gave The 100 a rating of 3 out of 5 stars and described it as an emotional cop drama that "delivers more than expected", praising its emotional depth and investigative narrative while noting minor pacing issues. In its review, The Hans India described The 100 as "a riveting thriller with heart and heft", praising its emotional core, social message and performances while noting that certain portions followed familiar genre conventions. Divya Shree of The Times of India rated it 2.5 out of 5. Eenadu praised the performance of Sagar. The streaming rights of this movie were acquired by Lionsgate Play and Amazon Prime Video on 29 August 2025.
