= Om Namo Venkatesaya =

2017 Indian film by K. Raghavendra Rao

- Theatrical release poster
- Directed by: K. Raghavendra Rao
- Screenplay by: K. Raghavendra Rao
- Story by: J. K. Bharavi
- Produced by: A. Mahesh Reddy
- Starring: Nagarjuna; Anushka Shetty; Saurabh Raj Jain; Jagapathi Babu; Pragya Jaiswal
- Cinematography: S. Gopal Reddy
- Edited by: Gautham Raju
- Music by: M. M. Keeravani
- Production company: AMR Sai Krupa Entertainments
- Release date: 10 February 2017
- Running time: 144 minutes
- Country: India
- Language: Telugu
- Box office: est. ₹20 crore

Om Namo Venkatesaya is a 2017 Indian Telugu-language Hindu devotional biographical film directed by K. Raghavendra Rao and produced by A. Mahesh Reddy on AMR Sai Krupa Entertainments banner. The film stars Nagarjuna as Hathiram Bhavaji, alongside Anushka Shetty, Jagapathi Babu, Saurabh Raj Jain, and Pragya Jaiswal. Sai Kumar, Rao Ramesh, Sampath Raj, Ashmita Karnani, Brahmanandam, and Ajay play supporting roles. It has music composed by M. M. Keeravani. The film was dubbed in Tamil as Akhilandakoti Brahmandanayagan. The film failed at the box office.

== Cast ==
- Nagarjuna as Hathiram Bhavaji/Rama/Ramanujan
- Anushka Shetty as Krishnamma
- Saurabh Raj Jain as Lord Venkateswara
- Vimala Raman as Lakshmi/ Padmavathi
- Jagapathi Babu as King
- Pragya Jaiswal as Bhavani
- Rao Ramesh as Govindarajulu
- Sampath Raj as Raaja Giridhara Rayalu
- Brahmanandam as Simhachalam
- Vennela Kishore as Govinda Rajulu's assistant
- Sai Kumar as Anubhavananda Swamy
- Ajay as Garuda
- Ashmita Karnani as Bhudevi
- Tanikella Bharani as Des Raj Baljot, Hathiram Bhavaji's father
- Sudha as Hathiram Bhavaji's mother
- Raghu Babu as Govinda Rajulu's assistant
- Sameer Hasan as Lord Shiva
- Pavitra Lokesh as Vakula Devi
- Gundu Sudarshan as Govinda Rajulu's assistant
- Prudhvi Raj
- Prabhakar
- Sudigali Sudheer as One of Simhachalam's Men
- Getup Srinu as Simhachalam's Second Man
- Jenny
- Sana
- Karuna as Anjana
- Auto Ramprasad as Simhachalam's Third Man

== Soundtrack ==
Om Namo Venkatesaya

Film score by M. M. Keeravani
- Released: 6 January 2017
- Recorded: 2016
- Genre: Soundtrack
- Length: 48:44
- Label: Lahari Music
- Producer: M. M. Keeravani

M. M. Keeravani chronology
Lacchimdeviki O Lekkundi (2016)	Om Namo Venkatesaya (2017)	Baahubali: The Conclusion (2017)

The music was composed by M. M. Keeravani and released on Lahari Music Company. The Audio launch held at Hitex N-Convention Centre, in Hyderabad, on 8 January 2017, coinciding with Mukkoti Ekadasi. Akkineni Naga Chaitanya and Akhil Akkineni has launched the audio, Akkineni Nagarjuna, Amala Akkineni, K. Raghavendra Rao, M.M.Keeravani, Jagapathi Babu, Dil Raju, Anushka Shetty, Pragya Jaiswal and several other members of the film industry attended the event.

No.	Title	Lyrics	Singer(s)	Length
1.	"Venkatesha Srinivasa"	Vedavyas	Ramya Behara	4:50
2.	"Anandam"	Chandrabose	Sarath Santosh, Shweta Pandit	4:05
3.	"Akhilanda Koti Brahmanda Nayaka"	Vedavyas	Sarath Santosh, T. Sreenidhi	4:22
4.	"Brahmanda Bhandamula"	Vedavyas	M. M. Keeravani	1:16
5.	"Kaliyuga Vaikuntapuri"	Vedavyas	S. P. Balasubrahmanyam, T. Sreenidhi, Ramya Behara	9:10
6.	"Vayyari Kalahamsika"	K. Siva Shakti Dutta, Dr. K. Rama Krishna	Revanth, Sunitha	3:25
7.	"Anda Pinda"	Vedavyas	Balaji, Muniraju, Sneha, Mohana Bhogaraju	2:20
8.	"Maha Padma Sadme"	Vedavyas	Saketh	1:02
9.	"Kamaneeyam Kaduramaneeyam"	Ramajogayya Sastry	S. P. Balasubrahmanyam	5:04
10.	"Brahmothsava"	Vedavyas	T. Sreenidhi	3:11
11.	"Pareeksha"	Ananta Sriram	Shankar Mahadevan	4:37
12.	"Govindha Hari Govindha Gokula Nandana"	Vedavyas	Dhanunjay Seepana, T. Sreenidhi	5:22
Total length:				48:44

== Critical reception ==
Sangeetha Devi Dundoo of The Hindu said, "Watch the film for Nagarjuna who comes up with another memorable performance. As you watch the story of a devotee who puts his love for the Lord above everything, it might make you go a little deeper and understand faith beyond rituals". A reviewer from The New Indian Express wrote, "The grandeur on display is unquestionable and the film is certainly a visual treat. But the actors, in their fine splendour, seem to dully run through the motions and the film fails to strike a chord overall."
