= Eesha (film) =

2025 Indian Telugu film by Srinivas Manne

- Theatrical release poster
- Directed by: Srinivas Manne
- Written by: Srinivas Manne
- Produced by: Pothula Hema Venkateswara Rao
- Starring: Thrigun; Hebah Patel; Akhil Raj Uddemari; Siri Hanmanth
- Cinematography: Santosh Sanamoni
- Edited by: Vinai Ramasamy V
- Music by: RR Dhruvan
- Production company: HVR Productions
- Distributed by: Bunny Vas Works; Vamshi Nandipati Entertainments
- Release date: 25 December 2025
- Country: India
- Language: Telugu
- Box office: ₹9.50 crore

Eesha is a 2025 Indian Telugu-language horror thriller film written and directed by Srinivas Manne. The film features Thrigun, Hebah Patel, Akhil Raj Uddemari and Siri Hanmanth in lead roles.

The film was released on 25 December 2025 and was a commercial success at the box office.

== Plot ==
Four childhood friends—Naina, Kalyan, Vinay, and Aparna—run a channel dedicated to debunking paranormal claims and exposing fraudulent spiritual practitioners. Firm believers in rationalism, they set out to investigate cases of alleged possession and supernatural activity.

During one such investigation, they encounter Dr. Aadidev, a former neurosurgeon who now practices as a spiritual healer near the Andhra Pradesh Orissa Border, claiming to treat individuals afflicted by supernatural forces. Initially dismissive of his methods, the group attempts to expose him as a fraud. However, a series of unexplained events begins to challenge their skepticism.

As they delve deeper, the friends experience disturbing occurrences that defy logical explanation, including visions, behavioral changes, and apparent instances of possession. Their investigation gradually uncovers links between Aadidev's practices and a series of past incidents involving unexplained deaths and occult rituals.

The group becomes entangled in a supernatural conflict that tests their beliefs and threatens their safety. As the boundary between reality and the paranormal blurs, they must confront forces beyond their understanding while attempting to uncover the truth behind Aadidev's activities and the entity known as “Eesha.”

== Cast ==
- Thrigun as Kalyan
- Hebah Patel as Naina
- Akhil Raj Uddemari as Vinay
- Siri Hanmanth as Aparna
- Babloo Prithiveeraj as Dr. Aadidev
- Mime Madhu as Punyavathi

== Music ==
The background score and songs were composed by RR Dhruvan.

All lyrics are written by RR Dhruvan.

Track listing
No.	Title	Singer(s)	Length
1.	"Isha Title Song"	Shankar Mahadevan	2:46
2.	"Friendship Song"	Shreya Ghoshal	3:26

== Release and reception ==
Eesha was initially scheduled to release on 12 December 2025 but was later released on 25 December 2025.

Sanjana Pulugurtha of The Times of India rated it 3 out of 5 and opined that "a more polished script and sharper screenplay might have elevated the film into a more compelling and consistently chilling experience". Suresh Kavirayani of Cinema Express rated it 2 out of 5 and quoted it as "a regular, by-the-book horror thriller that offers a few scattered scares".
