= Jay D'Souza =

Indian actor

- Born: 1 March 1995 (age 31); Karwar, Karnataka, India
- Other name: Jujje
- Occupations: Actor; model
- Years active: 2017–present
- Known for: Seetha Raman (2023)

Jay D'Souza (born 1 March 1995) is an Indian actor who has appeared in Tamil, Kannada and Telugu television serials. He began his career with the Kannada film Raaga in 2017, which gave him popularity among Kannada audience. He is also known for acting in the Tamil TV serial Seetharaman which aired on Zee tamil.

== Personal life ==
Jay was born in a Konkani-speaking family on 1 March 1995 in Karwar, Karnataka, India. He is a Catholic.

== Career ==
Jay appeared in the Kannada film Raaga which was released in 2017, he played a crucial role in the film alongside actors Mithra and Bhama. After his appearance in the film he was highly credited and praised for his acting techniques in the film. He later acted in popular Kannada TV serials such as Akashadeepa and Kalyani. Jay later debuted in Telugu through the serial Pavithra Bandanam playing the lead male role in the serial. He later debuted in Tamil through the serial Sippikkul Muthu which aired on Star Vijay playing the character of a rich businessman who loses his memory after an accident.

In 2017, Jay was expected to enter the reality show Bigg Boss Kannada (season 7), however he later last minute opted out from the show before the grand premiere and denied entering the show due to personal issues.

== Filmography ==
=== Films ===
Key
†	Denotes films that have not yet been released

Year	Film	Role	Notes
2017	Raaga	Gowtham	Debut
2017	Happy New Year	Karthik	

=== Television ===
Year	Serial	Role	Language	Channel	Notes
2016–2017	Manedevru	Surya	Kannada	Colors Kannada	
2017–2018	Pavithra Bandham	Reddy	Telugu	Star Maa	
2019–2020	Kalyani	Aravind	Telugu	Gemini TV	
2019–2020	Akashadeepa	Shanmuga	Kannada	Star Suvarna	
2021	Bombaat Bhojana	Himself	Kannada		Special Show
2021–2022	Hamsageetham	Rahul	Telugu	Gemini TV	
2022	Sippikkul Muthu	Aakash	Tamil	Star Vijay	
2023–2024	Seetha Raman	Raman	Tamil	Zee Tamil	
