= Manasu Mamata =

- Genre: Soap opera, drama
- Directed by: Anil Kumar
- Country of origin: India
- Original language: Telugu
- No. of episodes: 3,305

Production
- Production locations: Hyderabad; Visakhapatnam; Araku Valley; Borra Caves; Pollachi
- Running time: Approx. 22 minutes
- Production company: Mallemala Entertainments

Original release
- Network: ETV Network
- Release: 31 January 2011 – 17 November 2021

Manasu Mamata is an Indian Telugu serial airing on the ETV Telugu from Monday to Saturday at 7:30 pm (IST). Directed by Anil Kumar, this Telugu serial has completed 3305. The pilot episode aired on 31 January 2011.

== Plot ==
The story starts with Mr. Koteshwar Rao (Koti), who works for Harshavardan, a man of high status and affluence. Koti, a simple lower-middle class man, lives with his wife and their daughter, Archana, a beautiful girl with praiseworthy character. Archana is valued by Mr. Koti's boss, but Harshavardan's horrible daughter, Soundarya, is jealous of Archana and pulls pranks on her.

The story then turns to Ramprasad, an industrial worker whose wife Pooja dies, leaving his daughter Lalli (Lalitha) and him alone. Meanwhile, Archana joins a school as a teacher and is assigned to Lalli's class. Archana soon learns about Lalli and is highly empathetic towards her, which allows them to form a friendship. Shortly thereafter Ramprasad and Archana marry, and Lalli gains a loving mother for herself.

The newly formed family starts living happily with Ramprasad's parents, his brother Krishna, and his sister. Meanwhile, Soundarya keeps trying to cause problems for them, and in a turn of events, marries Krishna, Ramprasad's brother. She soon starts causing trouble for everyone in the house. She robs Ramprasad's father, who then dies of grief.

The story now turns to Gayatri Devi, a wealthy widow with a son called Bunny. Ramprasad and his family begin to lead a normal life, until Archana suddenly dies in an accident. Meanwhile, Soundarya divorces Krishna and marries Gayatri Devi's rich cousin, Shashank. The two of them then decide to kill Gayatri Devi and take her wealth.

The plot thickens when Krishna claims to have seen Archana. Knowing that this is impossible, Ramprasad does not believe him, but it is later discovered that Archana has a lookalike. The girl falls in love with Krishna and they get married. In another twist of events, however, Archana turns out to be not dead at all! She chose to run away from the house because she was unhappy. She now works as a laborer on a construction site which belongs to Gayatri Devi. Soon Gayatri Devi is murdered by Soundarya and Shashank. During the murder, Archana gets injured badly, scarring her face. The doctors decide to put Gayatri Devi's face on Archana to save her from an untimely death. After recovery, the doctors reveal the truth to Archana and she agrees to take Gayatri Devi's identity. Soundarya is shocked to see Gayatri Devi (who is actually Archana) still alive.

A bit later, Krishna and Archana's lookalike leave for the USA. Back at the real Archana's home, Bunny runs away. He is taken care of by a taxi driver's family and changes his name to Raja. As Raja, he now has a new enemy named Ashok. By this point, Soundraya has been found guilty and has been jailed for the murder of Gayatri Devi. Ashok is a police officer who holds a grudge against Raja. Raja flees his village and settles down in Hyderabad, moving in with a criminal called Shankar and his sister Laxmi. Ashok and Raja start fighting over Lalli, Ramprasad's now grown-up daughter. Lalli, however, ends up marrying Ashok. At this time, Krishna and his daughter Chandu land at Hyderabad. They tell their family that Archana's lookalike died in the USA.

Archana now reveals her actual identity to the family. Also, Raja learns of his real family history and inherits much money, so he starts an orphanage. Also, Shankar is killed by Ashok. Shankar's sister, Laxmi, falls in love with Raja, but Raja is in love with Chandu. Laxmi gives up on her pursuit for Raja and commits suicide. Due to certain misunderstandings, Raja and Chandu break up. However, when they are arguing one day, Raja proposes to Chandu out of nowhere. However, Chandu and Raja don't reveal this to anyone. They soon start living together again and reveal their marriage plans to everyone. Ramprasad does not agree to the marriage, and begins arguing with Raja. Due to all his stress, however, he dies of a heart attack.

Another twist in the tale arises when Archana's look alike is found again. Her real name is Jayanthi and owns a construction company: Jayanthi Constructions. Krishna is shocked by this. He starts working for the company, but realizes that Jayanthi is really a mean woman who shows no sympathy on her employees. One day, Chandu meets Jayanthi in her office. By the help of Jayanthi's father, who wants Jayanthi to marry, Chandu decides to get her father and Jayanthi married. Chandu convinces Jayanthi, and Jayanthi starts impressing Krishna. Right when Krishna agrees to marry Jayanthi, a case is put on Krishna. The girl who put the case on Krishna, Bhargavi, claims that Krishna is her father. Krishna disagrees, saying that he had no relations of these kind. But Bhargavi says that her mother, Soundarya, had written these truths when she was in jail and had even given birth to her in jail. She also had died in the jail.

The judge asks for a DNA test, which shows that Bhargavi was Krishna's daughter. Krishna then gets to know that Bhargavi had asked her friend to add some medicine in Krishna's Thumbs Up which he was drinking that day. Then Soundarya cheated. The friend tells this truth to Krishna, who now believes it and goes to Bhargavi. Bhargavi uses him as a servant, making up for the time Krishna didn't spend with her. Meanwhile, Chandu is diagnosed with brain cancer. She doesn't tell this to anyone and decides to leave everyone and everything and start fighting against Raja now, as she didn't want anyone to feel bad because of her death. Raja eventually gets angry and leaves her.

Chandu then finds out about this doctor called Chakravarthy, who leaves his wife and daughter Pinky due to some misunderstandings with his wife. Chandu then makes it her mission to join this family. She keeps trying, and Chandu's family keep searching for her. When she succeeds, Dr. Chakravarthy finds out about her disease and decides to cure her. The operation goes on, and Chandu's family is there in the hospital. Chandu is cured, but then the doctors realize that her eyesight is gone. Chandu stays blind for a few days before she is cured. Raja and Chandu get back together, and right when everything seems right, Bhargavi starts eyeing on Raja. She starts making Chandu suspicious of Raja, making her feel that Raja is cheating on her with Bhargavi. That's when Bhargavi files a case on Raja saying that he had tried to rape her.

Raja, with perfect evidence, wins the case. Archana now runs the orphanage that was started by Raja. That's when Chandu gets pregnant. When her good friend, a doctor, mentions to Krishna that she won't be able to have children and that Dr. Chakravarthy had mentioned this fact to her after Chandu's brain cancer operation. Everyone was happy at that time, no one got this topic. Chandu, was already holding grudges against Krishna Prasad, as she felt that her father had left her and was only with Bhargavi. Krishna comes and asks Chandu to get aborted, but does not mention the reason to her. Chandu feels that her father hates her now and that he never wants to see her happy, so she tells him to get lost. But when her friend slowly mentions the fact to Chandu, she sadly has to agree. After the operation, the doctor says that Chandu's problem has now been cured! Things between Chandu and her dad then cool down. Again after some time, Chandu gets pregnant.

Bhargavi targets Chandu and tries to get her killed. With the help of a doctor she survives and has a plastic surgery as her face is beyond repair. Raja thinks Chandu is dead and marries another woman. Some years later, Raja's son is now grown up. Raja finds out that Chandu is alive and unites with her. Raja's son marries a woman named Kaveri. It is revealed that Kaveri is working with Bhargavi. Kaveri kills Raja, but later finds out the truth about bhargavi. Bhargavi tries to get Raja's son killed but is saved from drowning by a young girl named Ganga. The police take Bhargavi into custody. Chandu and Kaveri live happily.

Story shifts to Ganga. She lives with an older sister and parents. She kills a man when he tries to molest her mother and goes to jail. She grows up in the jail, with the jailor looking after her. Once she is released from the jail, she initially has some troubles but reunites with her family. Her sister marries a police officer and she falls in love with someone else. Story also adds Kalyan Babu whose wife dies and leaves him and their daughter Madhu. Same time Ganga has an accident and her eyes are replaced with Kalyan Babu's wife's eyes. She then gets the memories of Kalyan Babu's wife into herself and starts feeling of Madhu as hew own. However all this gets resolved and Ganga reunites with her love and gets married. After some years a grown up Madhu's story continues.

== Cast ==
- Hari Teja as Archana, Surya Teja, Jayanthi
- Subhalekha Sudhakar as Koteswara Rao “Koti”, Archana and Surya Teja's father, Ram and Krishna’s father in law
- Guru Charan As IPS Ashok, Raja’s best friend, Krishna & Chandu’s brother & Lalli’s husband
- Baby Bavya Sree As Pinky, Chandu’s daughter & Koti’s childhood
- Vikas C. As Ram Prasad, Chandu big elder father & Krishna’s brother & Archana’s husband & Raja’s father & Lalli’s father
- Divya Rao As Bhargavi/Nandini, Raja & Chandu, Krishna’s henchmen
- Sneha As Madhavi
- Shruti as Chandu, Raja’s wife & Krishna’s daughter
- Priyatham Charan as Raja, Chandu’s husband former & Krishna’s son in law
- Ragini
- Ravi Krishna as Siddu/Anand
- Prasad Babu
- Vizag Prasad
- Anil Allam as Krishna Prasad, Chandu’s father & Jayanthi’s husband & Raja’s uncle
- Priyatham
- Hema Sri
- Krishna Reddy
- Ashmita Karnani, as Archana, Krishna’s Sister in law & Chandu’s mother, Raja’s colleague & Ram Prasad’s wife
- Aumkar Kotamraju
- Venu
- Kranthi
- Sirisha
- Seetha Mahalakshmi
- Sravya Sruthi
- Monisha
- Kalyan
- Chakri
- Yashwin
- Suresh Chandra
- Subbaraya Sarma
- Indu Anand
- Draksharamam Saroja
- Raaj
- Visweswara Rao
- Priyanka
- Shilpa Reddy
- Sravani Kondapalli
- Abhishek Yannam
- Varsha
- Jayaseela
- Manasa
- Shobha Rani
- Ishita Varsha
- Anusha
- Girish
- Dhana Lakshmi
- Nishanth
- Gayatri
- Srivani
- Malakpet Sailaja
- Kallu Krishna Rao
- Lalithya As Lalli, Ashok’s wife & Krishna’s younger brother & Ram Prasad’s daughter
- Sneha
- Mukesh
- Bhargava Rao Guttikonda
- Kavya Gowda
