= Raaga (film) =

2017 Indian Kannada romantic film by P.C. Shekar

- Directed by: P. C. Shekar
- Written by: P. C. Shekar
- Produced by: Mithra
- Starring: Mithra; Bhama
- Narrated by: Sudeep
- Cinematography: Vaidy S
- Edited by: D. Saravanan
- Music by: Arjun Janya
- Production company: Mithra Entertainers Cine Creations
- Release date: 21 April 2017
- Country: India
- Language: Kannada

Raaga is a 2017 Indian Kannada-language romantic drama film directed by P. C. Shekar and produced by Mithra. It features a love affair between two blind people, played by Mithra and Bhama. Whilst the soundtrack and score is by Arjun Janya, the cinematography is by S. Vaidi.

The film was released on 21 April 2017.

== Cast ==
- Mithra
- Jay D'Souza as Gowtham
- Bhama as Anu/Anusuya
- Avinash
- Rangayana Raghu
- Sadhu Kokila
- Roopika
- Bhau
- Nandini Vittal
- Jai Jagadish
- Ramesh Bhat
- Chandan Sharma
- 'Kaddipudi' Chandru
- Niranjan Deshpande

== Soundtrack ==
The score and soundtrack for the film was composed by Arjun Janya. The audio released on 20 March 2017. Lyricists Jayanth Kaikini, V. Nagendra Prasad and Kaviraj have been signed in to pen the songs.

No.	Title	Lyrics	Singer(s)	Length
1.	"Aalisu Baa"	Kaviraj	Armaan Malik, Sanjeev Chimmalgi
2.	"Belakendare"	Kaviraj	Haricharan, Indu Nagaraj
3.	"Manasina"	Jayanth Kaikini	Karthik, Anuradha Bhat
4.	"Yaare Nee"	V. Nagendra Prasad	Vyasa Raj
5.	"Raaga theme"		Sudeep
