= Hathiram Bhavaji =

Indian saint

Hathiram Bhavaji (हाथीराम भावजी)
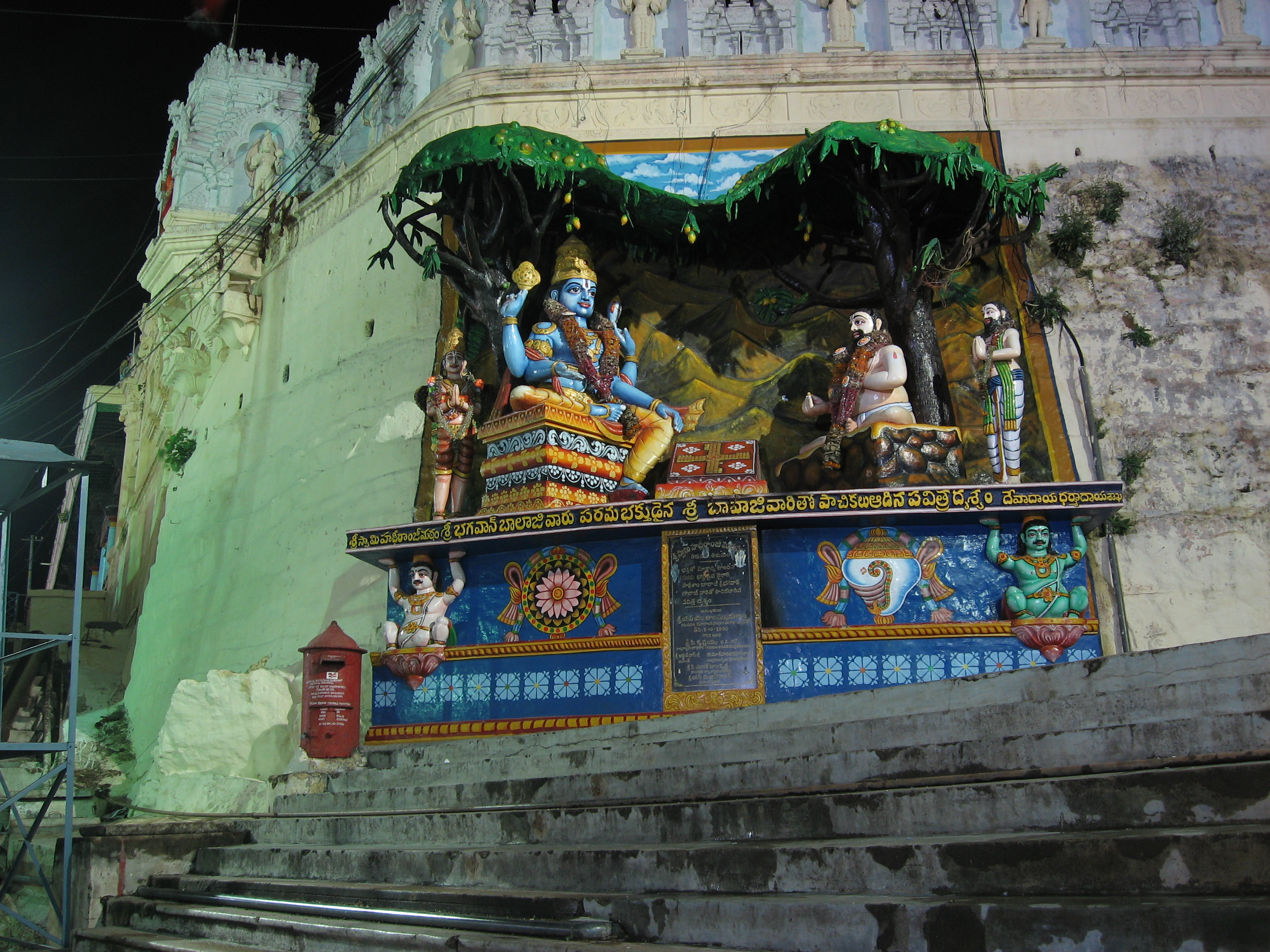
- Hathiram Bhavaji playing dice with Lord Venkateswara
- Born: Hathiram Bairagi; Unknown (1500 CE); Ayodhya, Uttar Pradesh, India
- Died: Unknown; Tirumala, Andhra Pradesh, India
- Resting place: Unmarked samadhi on Venkatadri Hill, Seshachalam, Tirumala
- Other name: Hathiram Baba
- Known for: Being a devotee of Venkateswara

Hathiram Baba was a great saint from Dalpatpur Uparhar, Maya, Ayodhya who visited Tirumala around 1500 CE on a pilgrimage and became a devotee of Lord Venkateswara. He settled there by setting up an ashram near the temple. According to a legend, he had the privilege of playing dice with Venkateswara.

The 1974 Kannada movie Sri Srinivasa Kalyana has the story of Bhavaji at the end, the role of Bhavaji played by Raja Shankar. The 2017 Telugu movie Om Namo Venkatesaya captures the story of Bhavaji in a great manner, with the role of Bhavaji played by Nagarjuna Akkineni.

== Life ==
Hathiram was born into a middle-class family in the village Dalpatpur Uparhar in Ayodhya, Uttar Pradesh. His real name was Aasa Ram Baljot. His Father's name was Des Raj Baljot. He has four brothers named, Kahna Ram, Meena Ram, Gulaba Ram and Budh Ram Baljot. His family moved to a Village Gunachaur near Banga city of Punjab. Every year on 5 Ashaad, people from Punjab and Himachala gather at village Gunachaur to pay tributes to Baba Hathiram. He stayed at Village Gunachaur for long time, then he left in the search of real God. The old name of village Gunachaur was "Tilla Raja Gopichand". According to legend Hathiram named Lord Venkateswara as Balaji. Not much of historical data is available about his life.

Hathiram was a devotee of Rama (an avatar of Vishnu). When he visited Tirumala, he decided to stay there and set up an ashram outside the temple. Hathiram Bhavaji Mutt was established in his name in Tirumala.

== Legend ==
It is believed that Venkateswara was pleased with his devotion and used to come to his place to play dice with him. One day, the game went on for too long and the Lord suddenly remembered that he was getting late for the daily worship. In a hurry, He left one of his ornaments, a necklace, in Bhavaji's ashram. When the priests opened the temple the next day, they found that an ornament was missing, and instituted a search for it. Bhavaji also realized what happened, and wanted to return the ornament to the temple. He was however caught and house-arrested by the temple guards who thought he was the thief.

The matter reached the then king of Chandragiri, Giridhara Raya, and he asked Bhavaji why he had stolen the ornament. Bhavaji narrated the incident of the previous night. The king expectedly did not believe the story and ordered his servants to fill the compound of Bhavaji's house with sugarcane, and asked Bhavaji to eat all of the sugarcane before dawn. If he failed, he will be sentenced to death. The king also asked his guards to stand outside the house to ensure that nobody went in. Since it was practically impossible to eat such a large amount of sugarcane for any human in one night, Bhavaji simply sat chanting the name of the Lord. After he eventually fell asleep, Venkateswara appeared in the form of a huge divine elephant appeared inside his home, finished the sugarcane within moments, and disappeared.

In the morning, the king was surprised to see all the sugarcane eaten. He verified with his guards that no elephant was seen the previous night outside the locked house. He then realized that the Lord himself had appeared as an elephant to save his devotee. The king was shocked and made Bhavaji the supervisor of the daily rituals performed at the Venkateswara Temple in Tirumala. Hathi means elephant in Hindi, and Bhavaji frequently chanted Ram. That is how he supposedly got his name.

It is believed that he died in Sajeeva Samadhi by being "After obtaining the divine approval, these enlightened saints fix the time and date for merging with the Almighty by attaining Jeevasamadhi" wish with the consent of Venkateswara. It is believed that Hathiram is still alive in the form of a soul (Atma) and is carrying out the main rituals and services to the deity in the Venkateswara Temple in Tirumala.

== Hathiramji Mutt ==
The Hathiramji Mutt was established in his name was used to administer the Tirumala temple from 1843 to 1932 before the creation of the Tirumala Tirupati Devasthanams.

== In popular culture ==
In the 1960 film, Sri Venkateswara Mahatyam, Chittor V. Nagaiah became the first actor to portray the role of Hathiram Bhavaji. In the 2017 Telugu film, Om Namo Venkatesaya, Nagarjuna Akkineni portrayed the role of Hathiram Bhavaji. Thus, South Indian plays or movies, specifically in the 1974 Kannada film, Sri Srinivasa Kalyana, adapted Hathiram Bhavaji in Venkateswara and Tirupati stories.
