= Collector Gari Bharya =

- Film poster
- Directed by: Tekula Kripakar Reddy
- Produced by: Vanitha Vani, Radhika Reddy
- Starring: Prakash Raj; Bhumika Chawla
- Music by: Chinna
- Release date: 5 November 2010
- Country: India
- Language: Telugu

Collector Gari Bharya (transl. Collector's wife) is a 2010 Telugu-language drama film directed by Tekula Kripakar Reddy. The film stars Prakash Raj and Bhumika Chawla. It was released on 5 November 2010. The film was dubbed and released in Tamil as Penn Adimai Illai.

== Cast ==
Credited cast:

- Prakash Raj as Gautham
- Bhumika Chawla as Indira
- Brahmanandam as Appalaraju / Pappalaraju
- Tanikella Bharani as Politician
- Babu Mohan as Politician
- Paruchuri Venkateswara Rao as Venkatachalam
- Chandra Mohan as Chandram
- Dharmavarapu Subrahmanyam as Subramanyam
- M. S. Narayana as Narayana
- Kondavalasa Lakshmana Rao as Krishna Rao
- Venu Madhav as Venu
- Vizag Prasad
- Malladi Raghava
- Sivaparvathy
- Delhi Rajeswari
- Ashmita Karnani
- Duvvasi Mohan as Duvvasi
- Shankar Melkote

== Production ==
Collector Gari Bharya marked the directorial debut of Tekula Kripakar Reddy, a US based businessman who earlier assisted Dasari Narayana Rao. The filming was held in places like Vizag, Rajamundry and Hyderabad.

== Soundtrack ==
Soundtrack was composed by Chinna. The audio was released at Taj Deccan, Hyderabad.

- "Sai Baba Karuninchu" - K. S. Chithra
- "Pachhi Mirchinira" - Suchitra
- "No No" - M. M. Manasi
- "Manasulona" - K. S. Chithra
- "Cheyi Cheyi" - K. S. Chithra

== Reception ==
Bharat Student wrote "The director has come up with a rather biased theme and though the presentation was good, the narrative was okay. The dialogues were good at places, the script was okay, the screenplay was average".
