= Seetha Raman =

Tamil-language Indian TV series

- Genre: Romance; Comedy; Drama
- Written by: Dialogues; Selvam Subbaiah; K. Kandaswamy
- Directed by: Brahma G. Dev
- Starring: Sri Priyanka; Jay D'Souza; Reshma Pasupuleti
- Theme music composer: Vishal Chandrashekhar
- Opening theme: "Seetha Kalyana..." sung by Sindhuri Vishal
- Country of origin: India
- Original language: Tamil
- No. of episodes: 352

Production
- Executive producer: Faisal Saleem C.S
- Producer: Xavier Britto
- Camera setup: Multi-camera
- Running time: 22 minutes
- Production company: Esthell Entertainers

Original release
- Network: Zee Tamil
- Release: 20 February 2023 – 4 May 2024

Seetha Raman is an Indian Tamil language television series which aired on Zee Tamil from 20 February 2023. Sri Priyanka and Jay D'Souza play the titular roles with Reshma Pasupuleti in a pivotal role.

== Cast ==
=== Main ===
- Priyanka Nalkari (February–July 2023) as Seetha
- Sri Priyanka (July 2023 – 2024) as Seetha
- Jay D'Souza as Ram
- Reshma Pasupuleti as Mahalakshmi / Nancy

=== Recurring ===
- Rani / Rekha Krishnappa as Archana and Kalpana
- Akshitha Bopaiah as Madhumitha
- R. Shyam as Surya
- Prabhakaran Chandran as Sethupathy
- Prakash Rajan as Subash Chandra Bose
- Yadhavi as Meera
- Hari Krishnan as Durai
- Maanas Chavali as Sathyan
- Saakshi Siva as Rajasekhar
- Vinodhini as Uma Maheswari
- Nancy as Anjali
- Sreepriya as Sathya
- Aiswarya Rajesh as Priya
- Egavalli as Swapna
- Meena Sellamuthu as Poornima
- Subha Geetha as Malini

=== Cameo appearance ===
- Senthil Kumar as Shanmugam (Episode–172)
- Deepa Shankar as Sevappi (2024)

== Production ==
=== Casting ===
Telugu actress Priyanka Nalkari initially played Seetha, the female lead role. Due to her marriage situations she had to stay abroad, so she quit the series in June 2023, then Sree Nidhi was approached to play the role but the team finalized Tamil film actress Sri Priyanka for the role of Seetha. Jay D'Souza, plays the male lead as Ram alongside her. Actress Rani initially played the supporting role as Archana, but later Rekha Krishnappa replaced her in that role and Reshma Pasupuleti, who rose to fame through Baakiyalakshmi joined the cast to play the pivotal role as Ram's stepmother. Saakshi Siva and Vinodhini play the roles of Seetha's father and mother respectively.

In end of August, actor Syed Saif was cast as Vishal, who played a negative role. In October, Naresh, a newcomer to the industry, joined the serial. In end of 16 April 2024, actor Amruthkalam was cast as Anpu. In the same month, actress Deepa Shankar was cast as Sigappi and Sankavi was cast as Sigappi's daughter.

=== Release ===
The first promo was unveiled on 31 January 2023, featuring Nalkari and revealing the title name. The second promo was unveiled on 3 February 2023, featuring Nalkari, Jay D’Souza, Reshma Pasupuleti and Akshitha Bopaiah and revealing the plot through a 2-minute song. The show started airing on Zee Tamil on 20 February 2023, replacing Ninaithale Inikkum’s time slot.

== Adaptations ==
Language	Title	Original release	Network	Last aired	Notes
Tamil	Seetha Raman சீதா ராமன்	20 February 2023	Zee Tamil	4 May 2024	Original
Telugu	Seethe Ramudi Katnam సీతే రాముడి కట్నం	2 October 2023	Zee Telugu	10 May 2025	Remake
Kannada	Brahmagantu ಬ್ರಹ್ಮಗಂತು	17 June 2024	Zee Kannada	7 August 2026	Remake

== Awards ==
Award	Category	Recipient	Role
Zee Tamil Kudumbam Viruthugal 2023	Most Promising Actor Female	Sri Priyanka	Seetha
Zee Tamil Kudumbam Viruthugal 2023	Most Promising Actor Male	Jay D'Souza	Ram
Zee Tamil Kudumbam Viruthugal 2023	Favourite Villi - Villain	Reshma Pasupuleti	Mahalakshmi
