= Shaadi Mubarak (film) =

2021 Telugu-language Indian film

- Theatrical release poster
- Directed by: Padmasri
- Written by: Padmasri
- Produced by: Dil Raju; Shirish
- Starring: Sagar; Drishya Raghunath
- Cinematography: Srikanth Naroj
- Edited by: Madhu
- Music by: Sunil Kashyap
- Production company: Sri Venkateswara Creations
- Release date: 5 March 2021
- Country: India
- Language: Telugu

Shaadi Mubarak is a 2021 Indian Telugu-language romantic comedy film directed by Padmasri and starring Sagar and Drishya Raghunath.

The film was released on 5 March 2021.

== Plot ==
Madhav, an introverted software employee, is compelled to meet 3 prospective brides arranged by a marriage bureau run by Jayamma. Satyabhama, daughter of Jayamma, a happy, go-lucky girl has to accompany Madhav in meeting his matrimonial alliances. During the journey, they find love in each other, yet, they don't express it. The story takes new turns with each future bride they meet.

== Cast ==
- Sagar as Sunnipenta Madhav
- Drishya Raghunath as Sathyabhama
- Banerjee
- Priyadarshini Ram
- RJ Hemanth
- Rahul Ramakrishna
- Shatru
- Ajay Ghosh
- Rajashree
- Bhadra
- Hema

== Reception ==
A critic from The Indian Express wrote that "It is the film’s simple take on life and love that makes it an entertaining watch. The film doesn’t take itself or its subject too seriously, keeping it light and frothy at all times".
