= Mogalirekulu =

Telugu language soap opera

- Title Card
- Created by: Srikanth Entertainment Pvt. Ltd
- Based on: Mogali Rekulu by Yaddanapudi Sulochana Rani
- Written by: Manjula Naidu (dialogues)
- Screenplay by: Manjula Naidu; Bindu Naidu
- Story by: Manjula Naidu
- Directed by: Manjula Naidu
- Starring: Indraneil; Sagar; Sheela Singh; Likitha Kamini/Karuna; Medha Bihri; Ravi Varma/Selvaraj; Muktar; Shruthi; Pavan Sai; Ravi Krishna
- Theme music composer: Bunty
- Country of origin: India
- Original language: Telugu
- No. of seasons: 2
- No. of episodes: 1,240

Production
- Producers: Sudhakar Pallamala; Shashank Pallamala
- Editor: Raam
- Camera setup: Baba; Ravi Chepur
- Running time: 20 minutes

Original release
- Network: Gemini TV
- Release: 18 February 2008 – 24 May 2013

Related
- Sravana Sameeralu; Chakravakam (TV series)

Mogalirekulu was an Indian Telugu-language drama television series which originally premiered on 18 February 2008 on Gemini TV and ran until 24 May 2013. It was directed by Manjula Naidu, who co-wrote alongside Bindu Naidu. It is one of the longest-running Telugu series. The show starred Sagar, Sheela, Likhitha Kamini, Indraneel and Medha in the lead roles.

Mogalirekulu focuses on vengeance. Season 1 focuses on Dharma, the eldest of five orphans, looks after the younger ones, Satya, Daya, Santhi and Keerthana, who also want to avenge their parents' death. The story has many twists, drama and touches upon social responsibilities, too. Season 2 focuses on their children Mahidhar Naidu/Munna, Devi, Durga, Pallavi, Eshwar and Sindhu.

== Synopsis ==
The story begins with three boys Dharma, Satya and Daya and their little sister, Shanti. Four of them are the victims of a family feud where their parents and grandmother are murdered by their step grandmother and uncles. They are joined by their neighbor's child Keerthana, who is a victim of a mother's innocent passion for music. They decide to leave for Hyderabad but the things take twists and turns resulting the three brothers and Keerthana was being in Hyderabad and their sister Santi, after separating from her brothers, living with her uncle and step-grandmother.

ACP RK Naidu (who is later the DGP, Mumbai) is a strict, dynamic and responsible IPS officer who marries Shanti after saving her from clutches of her uncle and grandmother. Dharma meets Selva Swamy who indulges in illegal activities which brings the enmity between RK and Selva.

After knowing that Dharma is Santi's brother and many misunderstandings RK come to conclusion that Dharma being an honest friend and sensitive person is just helping his friend Selva in his activities and start adoring him. RK successfully puts the culprits of santi's parents behind the bars as promised to Dharma. A love triangle start confusion among Dharma, Keerthana and Selva (created by Selva's mother where she blackmailed Keerthana to marry Selva for saving Dharma) results in dire enmity of Selva for Dharma and RK where he plans a bomb blast to kill them and the results being death of Daya and Rk and Santi losing their son Mahidhar Naidu.

The serial is into second generation then having Munna, the son of RK Naidu as the hero, who has been orphaned due to the bomb blast who is brought up in a criminal background by a don Sikandar Bhai. Munna falls in love with Devi who is the niece of Selva. Selva feels attached to her as she resemble Selva's wife Meenakshi. Hence he decides to have her marry his elder son Eshwar. Due to some clashes Munna and Eshwar argue and fight. But Munna and Devi become friends and her marriage with Eshwar is called off when she reveals her true feelings for munna on the day before wedding, bothering her parents, Eshwar and his grandmother. Munna and Devi marry. Munna plots to attack DGP RK as a part of his criminal life but decides not to because of his good nature and later learns that RK is his father. Munna unable to face his father, hides his identity and changes his name to 'Mahendhra' and starts a health service called AHS to serve rural people and comes back to RK after protecting RK from a bomb blast. While he is away, Devi goes to stay with RK's family by hiding her identity saying that she needs protection until her husband Munna comes back. Meanwhile, RK learns that Munna aka Mahidhar is indeed their son Mahi through Selva Swamy. In Meanwhile, Pallavi and Durga love each other despite their parents' rivalry. RK's family accepts Devi as their daughter-in-law and Devi conceives. The story ends with the families of RK and Selva uniting when Selva's sons marry Dharma and Satya's daughters and they learn that Dharma is alive.

== Cast ==
Actor	Character
Indraneil Varma	Dharma
Sagar	RK Naidu, Munna/Mahidhar Naidu
Sheela Singh	Shanti
Selva Raj Arumugam and Ravi Varma (Santhosh Adduri)	Selva Swamy
Madhusudhan Rao	Shankar
Likitha Kamini and Karuna Bhushan	Devi Priya
Sruthi	Gomathi
Mukhtar Khan	Sikandar Bhai
Pavan Sai	Eshwar
Ravi Krishna	Durga
Hari Krishna	Ali
Sireesha Dhamera and Medha Bahri	Sindhu
Reshma Rathore and Sonia	Pallavi
Medha Bahri and Raga Madhuri	Keerthana
Vijay Reddy and Dwarakesh	Satya Vardhan
Pavitranath	Daya Sagar
Likitha Kamini	Meenakshi
Vijay Bhargav	Shiva
Y. Vijaya	Mahalakshmi
Anjali	Anjali
Radha Krishna and Madhusudhan	Shankar
Sripriya	Rajini
Nagamani	Muniamma
Rajani, Sowjanya, and Kalpana Latha	Madhurima
Nitesh	Phani
Lahari Vishnuwazhala	Aishwarya
Muskaan Chowdhry	Megha
Mohan Kumar	Mohan
Kasi	Sateesh
Ashok Rao	Raghavendra
Vijay	Pratap
Surya	Surya
Sameera	Swathi
Ranganath	Brigadier Chandra Sekhar Rao
Sai Satish	Imran
Bank Srinivas	Viswanathan
Jyothi	Rajeshwari
Harsha	Mahidhar
BHEL Prasad	DGP
Sri Lakshmi	Annapoornamma
Irneni Ramesh	Ram Moorthy
Madhumani	Susheela
Uday	Narayana Rao
Deepa	Uma Devi
Swetha	Gowri
Roja	Smitha
Sravani	Keerthana's mother
Mime Madhu	Shiva Ram
Ravi Kishore	Varma
Shiva Kumar	Shivalkar
Jyothi Reddy	Megha's mother
Captain Raju	Chief Minister
Vara Prasad	Surya's Brother
Raghavayya	Home Minister
Sravani	Manasa
Rajitha and Lalitha	Raziya
Mohan Bhagath	
Pawon Sae	

== Production ==
Mogalirekulu marked the debut of Pavan Sai.

== Soundtrack ==
Track listing
No.	Title	Lyrics	Music	Singer(s)	Length
1.	"Title Song"	Balabadrapatruni Madhu	Bunty	Bunty	2:41

== Accolades ==
Award	Category	Recipient(s)	Result	Ref.
Ugadi Gemini TV Awards	Best Primetime Serial	Mogalirekulu	Won	
