= L. V. Revanth =

Indian playback singer

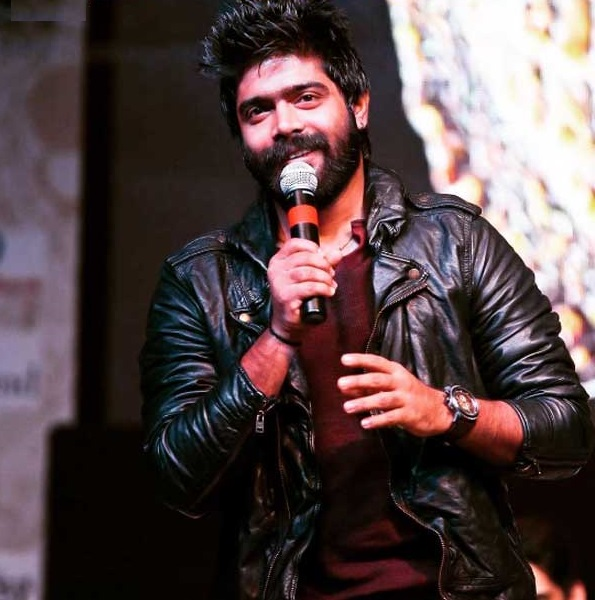

Background information
- Born: 10 February 1990 (age 36); Srikakulam, Andhra Pradesh, India
- Genres: Filmi; Indian pop; electronic
- Occupation: Playback singer
- Instrument: Vocals
- Years active: 2008–present
- Spouse: Anvitha Gangaraju (m. 2022)

L. V. Revanth (born 10 February 1990), is an Indian playback singer who primarily records songs for Telugu films. He has sung around 200 songs for Telugu films. His notable works include "Vey Vey Debbaku Debba" (from Rajanna), "Ruler" (from Dammu), "Manohari" (from Baahubali: The Beginning) and "Telisiney Na Nuvvey" (from Arjun Reddy). He is the recipient of an IIFA Utsavam Award and a Santosham Award.

Before gaining success in his singing career, Revanth had earlier participated in television singing shows, including Super Singer, Indian Idol and Saptaswaralu. He is the winner of the reality show Bigg Boss 6.

== Early and personal life ==
Revanth was born in Srikakulam to Seetha Subbalaxmi. His father died before he was born. He grew up in Visakhapatnam and did his schooling at Bala Bhanu Vidyalayam in Srikakulam and his bachelor's degree at Dr. V. S. Krishna Government College in Visakhapatnam. He has an elder brother, Santosh Kumar. He and his elder brother were raised by their mother.

Revanth married Anvitha Gangaraju in February 2022.

== Career ==
Before gaining recognition as a singer, Revanth participated in several television singing shows. One of his first shows was Sapthaswaralu, which aired on ETV. After being runner-up in Super Singer 5 and Super Singer 7. he was the mentor in the Super Singer 8. Revanth won the Hindi reality singing show Indian Idol 9. He also won Rock Star, Spicy Singer on Maa TV and Superstar of the South.

In 2008, he sang his first film song, "Jhalak Dikhlaja" in Maha Yagnam, composed by Vandemataram Srinivas. He sang two songs "Telisiney Na Nuvvey" and "Oopiri Aaguthunnadey" in the 2017 film Arjun Reddy. He considers M. M. Keeravani as his mentor.

Revanth sang his first Kannada song in the 2013 film Coffee with My Wife and the first Hindi song for the 2017 reality show Sabse Bada Kalakar. In 2019, he composed and sang the title track of the TV series Radhamma Kuthuru. His first Tamil song was "Vithi Nathiye", from the 2019 film Thadam.

== Discography ==
=== Film songs ===
Year	Work	Song	Composer	Language
2008	Maha Yagnam	"Jalak Diklaja"	Vandemataram Srinivas	Telugu
2009	Illa Choodu Okasari	"Lovvenduku Pettaduru Devudu"	Prasad	Telugu
2009	Posani Gentleman	"Gentleman"	Arjun	Telugu
2009	Vatapatra Sai	"Sruthilayalerugani"	Illayaraja	Telugu
2009	Vesavi Selavullo	"Dola Dola"	Praveen Moghal	Telugu
2010	Kothimooka	"Ammalarra"	Mani Sharma	Telugu
2010	Rakshana	"Ye Deshki Dhadkan"		Telugu
2010	Lokame Kothaga	"Edalone Enno Unna"	Lalith–Manomurthy	Telugu
2010	Lokame Kothaga	"Lokame Kothaga"	Lalith–Manomurthy	Telugu
2010	Maa Voori Maharshi	"Evadabba Sommani"	Visshu–Subbu	Telugu
2010	Maa Voori Maharshi	"Kala Nijamaithe"	Visshu–Subbu	Telugu
2010	Mangala	"Mangala"	Viswa	Telugu
2011	Anukokunda Emjarigindhante	"I am Lekkallo"	Kaasarla Shyam	Telugu
2011	Badrinath	"Amba Dari"	M. M. Keeravani	Telugu
2011	Badrinath	"Chiranjeeva"	M. M. Keeravani	Telugu
2011	Graduate	"Gadichina Kashanamu"	Sandeep	Telugu
2011	Kandireega	"Premey"	S. Thaman	Telugu
2011	Madatha Kaja	"Gungudu Gudu Gudu"	Sri Vasanth	Telugu
2011	Madatha Kaja	"Madatha Kaja"	Sri Vasanth	Telugu
2011	Nuvvila	"Baby Aa Popula Dabba"	Shekar Chandra	Telugu
2011	Rajanna	"Okka Kshanam"	M. M. Keeravani	Telugu
2011	Rajanna	"Raa Ree Ro Rela"	M. M. Keeravani	Telugu
2011	Rajanna	"Vey Vey"	M. M. Keeravani	Telugu
2011	Thrilling	"Navvakunda"	Rajendra Prasad	Telugu
2011	Vykuntapali	"Pranaley Poyeloga"	Anil Gopireddy	Telugu
2012	Anarkali	"Nee Style"	P.N. Roy	Telugu
2012	Bus Stop	"Bus Stop Title Song"	J. B.	Telugu
2012	Bus Stop	"Kalalake Kanulochina"	J. B.	Telugu
2012	Chaduvukune Rojullo	"Edhi Sweetage"	Jeevith Krupa	Telugu
2012	Chanakyudu	"Chanakyudu"	K Valisha Babji	Telugu
2012	Daiva Swaranjali	"Yekkadunnavayya"		Telugu
2012	Dammu	"Ruler"	M. M. Keeravani	Telugu
2012	Disco	"Prema Enduke Ila"	Mantra Anand	Telugu
2012	Ee Rojullo	"Cell Song"	J. B.	Telugu
2012	Ee Rojullo	"Edho Edho"	J. B.	Telugu
2012	Idi Mamulu Prema Katha Kadu	"Thodunanuko"	Quddus	Telugu
2012	Jollyga Enjoy Cheddam	"Guntur Kurrallu"	Kuna Praveen Kumar	Telugu
2012	Jollyga Enjoy Cheddam	"Nelavanka"	Kuna Praveen Kumar	Telugu
2012	Maa Abbai Engineering Student	"Ninne Neeku Chupedi"	Chinni Charan	Telugu
2012	Memu Vayasuku Vachham	"Love you Antundhi"	Shekar Chandra	Telugu
2012	Naa Ishtam	"Haayi Haayiga"	Chakri	Telugu
2012	Premalo Padithe	"Premalo Padithe"	Charavarthy	Telugu
2012	Rowdigari Pellam	"Apakunda Endukanta"	Arjun	Telugu
2012	Rowdigari Pellam	"Seesaku Pagulu"	Arjun	Telugu
2012	Shirdi Sai	"Vasthunna Baba"	M. M. Keeravani	Telugu
2012	Sudigadu	"Gajibiji Gathukula Roaddu"	Sri vasanth	Telugu
2012	Sudigadu	"Jagaalu Mottham"	Sri vasanth	Telugu
2012	Yem Babu Laddu Kavala	"Rani Rani"	M M Sreelekha	Telugu
2013	Second Hand	""Breaking News Konjam""	Ravichandra	Telugu
2013	Athadu Aame O Scooter	"Drumm Drumm"	Chinni Krishna	Telugu
2013	Coffee with My Wife	"Chakkani Vaadey"	Manthra Anand	Kannada
2013	Coffee with My Wife	"Govinda Govinda"	Manthra Anand	Kannada
2013	Coffee with My Wife	"Saayare Sayya"	Manthra Anand	Kannada
2013	DK Bose	"Mr. D K Bose"	Achu Rajamani	Kannada
2013	Emo Gurram Egaravachu	"Bullabbayini Edipinchina Neelaveni"	M. M. Keeravani	Telugu
2013	Emo Gurram Egaravachu	"Boore Buttalo Padda Gurram"	M. M. Keeravani	Telugu
2013	Gurudu	"Gurudu"	Anand	Telugu
2013	Love Life	"Pakka Dindi"	Srinivas Raju	Telugu
2013	Mahesh	"Match Ke Pone"	Gopi Sunder	Telugu
2013	Music Magic	"Kothale Koyokandira"	Padmanav T	Telugu
2013	Na Rakumarudu	"Thapeshwaram Khaja"	Achu Rajamani	Telugu
2013	Nenu Chala Worst	"Yamma Yama"	Pardhu	Telugu
2013	Park	"O Baby Bangaru"	M. M. Srilekha	Telugu
2013	Parking	"Nannu Nuvve"	Babu Sastry	Telugu
2013	Prema Katha Chitram	"I Just Love You Baby"	J. B.	Telugu
2013	Prema Katha Chitram	"Vennelaina Cheekataina"	J. B.	Telugu
2013	Priyathama Neevachata Kusalama	"Allari Allaripilla"	Sai Karthik	Telugu
2013	Romance	"Anu Anu"	Sai Karthik	Telugu
2013	Ryee Ryee	"Lachimi Lachimi"	Sri Vasanth	Telugu
2013	Ryee Ryee	"Ryee Ryee"	Sri Vasanth	Telugu
2013	Snehame Thoduga	"Tholi Tholi Tholakari"	Chukka Srinivas	Telugu
2014	10th Lo Luck Inter Lo Kick B-Techlo	"10th Classlo Luck"	J. S. Raju	Telugu
2014	Aa Aiduguru	"Edhurey Ledhuani"	Anand	Telugu
2014	Ak Rao	"AAA Ak Rao"	K. S. Rao	Telugu
2014	Ali Baba Okkade Donga	"Nene Neevanna"	Sai Srikanth	Telugu
2014	Apartment	"Jaadu No 1"	Quddus	Telugu
2014	Apartment	"Yem Maya Chesinave"	Quddus	Telugu
2014	Dikkulu Choodaku Ramayya	"Chembisthri"	M. M. Keeravani	Telugu
2014	Hrudaya Kaleyam	"Nene Sampoo"	RK	Telugu
2014	I am in Love	"Paddhendhellu Kharchayyayi"	Pradeep K K	Telugu
2014	Just Business	"Bhajana Bhajana"	Ajay Patnaik	Telugu
2014	Just Business	"Yem Mayo"	Ajay Patnaik	Telugu
2014	Kotha Janta	"Charminar Galli"	J. B.	Telugu
2014	Kulfi	"Gunde Enthaga"	Vivek-Mervin	Telugu
2014	Laddu Babu	"Laddu Babu"	Chakri	Telugu
2014	Love You Bangaram	"Rendu Kallu Saalavata"	Mahith Narayan	Telugu
2014	Lovers	"Lovers Title Song"	J. B.	Telugu
2014	Lovers	"Pedavi Chivara"	J. B.	Telugu
2014	Mirchi Lanti Kurradu	"Michi Lanti Kurrade"	J. B.	Telugu
2014	Mirchi Lanti Kurradu	"Luck is my name"	J. B.	Telugu
2014	Mirchi Lanti Kurradu	"Types of Love"	J. B.	Telugu
2014	Mukunda	"Chesededo"	Mickey J Meyer	Telugu
2014	Nakenduku Nachave	"Nakenduku Nachave"	A. R. Sunny	Telugu
2014	Nenu Naa Friends	"Are Mamu"	Chinnicharan	Telugu
2014	Nenu Naa Friends	"Golilaata"	Chinnicharan	Telugu
2014	Pancha Boothalu Sakshigha	"Naadantha Oka Roote"	Vara Prasad	Telugu
2014	Pawanism	"Yemaindo"	Kanishka	Telugu
2014	Pelladandi Preminchaka Matrame	"Lifelone Gelichanne"	Vamsi–Ganesh	Telugu
2014	Raghuvaran B. Tech (Dubbed version)	"Luckkanna Mate Nillu"	Anirudh Ravichander	Telugu
2014	Raghuvaran B. Tech (Dubbed version)	"Nippulanti Nirudyogi"	Anirudh Ravichander	Telugu
2014	Rangageethagalu	"Manujadhama"	R. Paramasivan	Kannada
2014	Vichakshana	"Prakshalana"	Jagannath Sindhi	Telugu
2014	Vichakshana	"Sandella Mardala"	Jagannath Sindhi	Telugu
2015	Anaganaga Oka Chitram	"O Sanjana"	Vinod Yajamanya	Telugu
2015	Baahubali: The Beginning	"Manohari"	M. M. Keeravani	Telugu
2015	Evariki Evaru	"Na Manase"	Chinni Krishna	Telugu
2015	Hora Hori	"Raanantavenduke"	Koduri Kalyani	Telugu
2015	Kai Raja Kai	"Okati Rendu Mudu"	J. B.	Telugu
2015	Kai Raja Kai	"Benjilaga Vacchindira"	J. B.	Telugu
2015	Kai Raja Kai	"Kai Raja Kai"	J. B.	Telugu
2015	Preminchu Pelladu	"Nannu Thadime Thapana Yedhuko"	Ajay Patnaik	Telugu
2015	Rey	"Dance"	Chakri	Telugu
2015	Swimming Pool	"Galullo Ragalaki"	Pradeep Chandra	Telugu
2015	Vandanam	"Abbayi Boyfriend"	J. B.	Telugu
2015	Vikramarkudi Love Story	"Misslle Strength"	Ghantasala N.Viswanath	Telugu
2016	Bhadram Be Careful Brotheru	"Hello Hello Na Darling"	J. B.	Telugu
2016	Digbandhana	"Dikkule Mokku"	Ram Sudhanvi	Telugu
2016	Dll Unna Raju	"Okate Malli"	Gowtham	Telugu
2016	Dwaraka	"Allabbi Allabbi"	Sai Karthik	Telugu
2016	Eedo Rakam Aado Rakam	"Ko Ko Kodi"	Sai Karthik	Telugu
2016	Intlo Deyyam Nakem Bhayam	"Sathamaanam Bhavathi"	Sai Karthik	Telugu
2016	Jakkanna	"Helper"	Dinesh	Telugu
2016	Janu Nuvvekkada	"Urime Merupula"	Murali Leon	Telugu
2016	Kathanam	"Kalalaaye"	Sabu Varghese	Telugu
2016	Kathanam	"Kalalanni Pandy"	Sabu Varghese	Telugu
2016	Krishnashtami	"Krishnashtami"	Dinesh	Telugu
2016	Krishnashtami	"Gokula Thilaka"	Dinesh	Telugu
2016	Nagabharanam	"Raava Bangaram"	Gurukiran	Telugu
2016	Nenena	"Kaalam Kadhalo"	Ajay Arasada	Telugu
2016	Nenena	"Rudhiraagrahavva"	Ajay Arasada	Telugu
2016	Nenu Seethadevi	"Kalaganaledu"	Chaitanya Raja	Telugu
2016	Nuvvunte Nee Jaathaga	"Konchem Konchem"		Telugu
2016	Pidugu	"Gola Gola"	R. Karthik Kumar	Telugu
2016	Speedunnodu	"Ammayini Abbbayi Chudagane"	Sri Vasanth	Telugu
2016	Speedunnodu	"Kasai Katthi Padhunu"	Sri Vasanth	Telugu
2016	Speedunnodu	"Aatakundhoy"	Sri Vasanth	Telugu
2016	Speedunnodu	"Rekkalatho Chukkalakegira"	Sri Vasanth	Telugu
2016	Speedunnodu	"Ye Sunami Ina"	Sri Vasanth	Telugu
2016	Srirastu Subhamastu	"Desi Girl"	S. Thaman	Telugu
2016	Chuttalabbai	"Chuttalabbayi"	S. Thaman	Telugu
2016	Supreme	"Andam Hindolam"	Raj–Koti	Telugu
2016	Thikka	"Nee Kosam"	S. Thaman	Telugu
2017	Arjun Reddy	"Telisiney Na Nuvvey"	Radhan	Telugu
2017	Arjun Reddy	"Oopiri Aaguthunnadhey"	Radhan	Telugu
2017	Darre	"Beautiful Oh Baby"	G. R. Naren	Telugu
2017	Darsakudu	"Akasam Dinchi"	Sai Kartheek	Telugu
2017	Luckunnodu	"Aisa Laga"	Praveen Lakkaraju	Telugu
2017	Luckunnodu	"Ravera"	Praveen Lakkaraju	Telugu
2017	Luckunnodu	"What DA F"	Praveen Lakkaraju	Telugu
2017	Nakshatram	"Layire Layire"	Bheems Ceciroleo	Telugu
2017	Om Namo Venkatesaya	"Vayyari Kalahamsika"	M. M. Keeravani	Telugu
2017	Oxygen	"Adi Lekka"	Yuvan Shankar Raja	Telugu
2017	Raja the Great	"Raja The Great Title Song"	Sai Kartheek	Telugu
2017	Samayam	"Gaganamloni"	Ghana Shyam	Telugu
2017	Sivalinga (Dubbed version)	"Saarah Saarah"	S. Thaman	Telugu
2017	Ungarala Rambabu	"Nuvve Naa Adhrushtam"	Ghibran	Telugu
2018	Balakrishnudu	"Entha Varalaina"	Mani Sharma	Telugu
2018	Gang (Dubbed version)	"Naala Nenu"	Anirudh Ravichander	Telugu
2018	Gang (Dubbed version)	"Gang Title Track"	Anirudh Ravichander	Telugu
2018	Jai Simha	"Priyam Jagame Anandhamayam"	Chirrantan Bhatt	Telugu
2018	Jai Simha	"Yevevo Yevevo Cheppalanipisthundhi"	Chirrantan Bhatt	Telugu
2018	Mental Madhilo	"Edhola Edhola"	Prashanth R Vihari	Telugu
2018	PSV Garuda Vega	"Premale"	Sricharan Pakala	Telugu
2018	Krishnarjuna Yudham	"Ela Ela"	Hiphop Tamizha	Telugu
2018	Krishnarjuna Yudham	"I Wanna Fly"	Hiphop Tamizha	Telugu
2018	Vijetha	"Salaam Salaam"	Harshavardhan Rameshwar	Telugu
2018	Geetha Govindam	"What the Life"	Gopi Sundar	Telugu
2019	Thadam	"Vithi Nathiye"	Arun Raj	Tamil
2019	Whistle (Dubbed Version)	"Verrekiddam"	A. R. Rahman	Telugu
2021	Cycle	"Patasala"	G. M. Sathish	Telugu
2021	Chaavu Kaburu Challaga	"My Name Iju Raju"	Jakes Bejoy	Telugu
2021	Reddy Garintlo Rowdyism	"O Floweru Thechi"	Mahith Narayan	Telugu
2021	Seetimaarr	"Seetimaarr Title Song"	Mani Sharma	Telugu
2021	Yuvarathnaa (Dubbed Version)	"Feel the Power"	S. Thaman	Telugu
2021	Missing	"Baanam Pattu"	Ajay Arasada	Telugu
2022	Acharya	"Saana Kastam"	Mani Sharma	Telugu
2022	Shekar	"Love Gante"	Anup Rubens	Telugu
2023	Bro	"My Dear Markandeya"	Thaman S	Telugu
2023	Bhola Shankar	"Bholaa Mania"	Mahati Swara Sagar	Telugu
2023	King of Kotha (Dubbed Version)	"Hallaa Machaare"	Jakes Bejoy	Telugu
2023	Rules Ranjann	"Enduku Ra Babu"	Amrish	Telugu
2023	Leo (Dubbed Version)	"Ney Ready"	Anirudh Ravichander	
2023	Leo (Dubbed Version)	"Naa Ready"	Anirudh Ravichander	Kannada
2023	Leo (Dubbed Version)	"Njan Ready"	Anirudh Ravichander	Malayalam
2023	Leo (Dubbed Version)	"Ready Chal"	Anirudh Ravichander	Hindi
2025	Mazaka	"Sommasilli Pothunnave"	Leon James	Telugu
2025	28 Degree Celsius	"Cheliya Cheliya"	Shravan Bharadwaj	Telugu
2025	Kannappa	"Love Song"	Stephen Devassy	Telugu
2025	The 100	"Hey Meghale"	Harshavardhan Rameshwar	Telugu

=== Non-film songs ===
Year	Work	Song	Composer	Notes
Unknown	Voice of Youth	"Everyday"	Nitish Narayan	Studio album
2017	Kalyana Vaibhogam	"Kalyana Vaibhogam" (Title track)	Meenakshi Bhujang	TV show
2017	Sabse Bada Kalakar	"Sabse Bada Kalakar" (Title track)		TV show
2018	–	"Nanna"	Karthik Kodakandla	Single
2019	Radhamma Kuthuru	"Radhamma Kuthuru" (Title track)	L. V. Revanth	TV show
2023	Nijam With Smita	"Episode 8 Closing Song"	Saketh Komanduri	Television talk show
2025	Rambo in Love	"The Rage Cage Song"	VC Vibes	TV show

== Filmography ==
=== Television ===
List of television appearances
Year	Title	Network	Role	Notes
2010	Super Singer 5	Maa TV	Contestant	Runner-up
2013	Saptaswaralu	ETV	Contestant	
2013	Super Singer 7	Maa TV	Contestant	Runner-up
2014–2015	Super Singer 8	Star Maa	Mentor	
2016–2017	Indian Idol 9	Sony Entertainment Television	Contestant	Winner
2020–2021	Sa Re Ga Ma Pa The Next Singing ICON	Zee Telugu	Jury member	
2022	Sa Re Ga Ma Pa The Singing Superstar	Zee Telugu	Mentor	
2022	Bigg Boss 6	Star Maa	Contestant	Winner
2024	Sa Re Ga Ma Pa The Next Singing Youth Icon	Zee Telugu	Mentor	

== Awards and nominations ==
Year	Award	Category	Nominated work	Result	Ref
2012	BIG FM Awards	Best Upcoming Male Playback Singer	"Ambadari" and "Chiranjeeva Chiranjeeva" from Badrinath	Won	
2012	Maa Music Awards	Best Male Playback Singer	"Vey Vey Debbaku Debba" from Rajanna	Won	
2015	Maa Music Awards	Best Male Playback Singer	"Manohari" from Baahubali: The Beginning	Nominated	
2015	IIFA Utsavam	Best Playback Singer – Male (Telugu)	"Manohari" from Baahubali: The Beginning	Nominated	
2017	TSR–TV9 Awards	Special Jury Award	–	Won	
2018	Filmfare Awards South	Best Male Playback Singer – Telugu	"Telisaney Na Nuvvey" from Arjun Reddy	Nominated	
2018	Santosham Film Awards	Best Male Playback Singer	"Telisaney Na Nuvvey" from Arjun Reddy	Won	
