= Sagar (actor) =

Indian Telugu-language actor (born 1983)

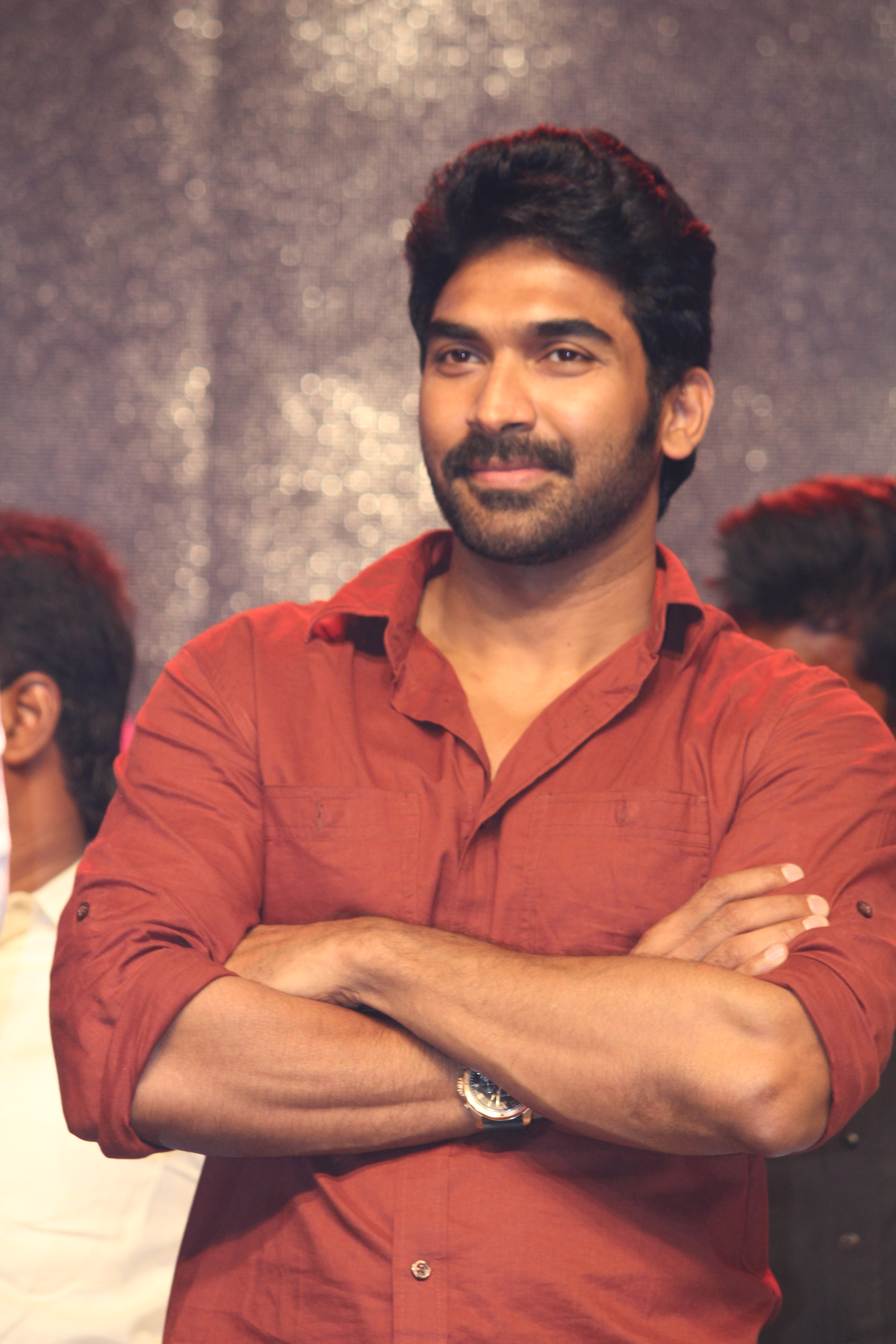
- Occupation: Actor
- Years active: 2006–present
- Spouse: Soundarya (m. 2017)

Sagar is an Indian actor who primarily works in Telugu television. He is known for essaying the lead role in Chakravakam (2006) and Mogali Rekulu (2008–2013). Sagar is a recipient of Nandi TV Award for Best Actor.

== Career ==
Sagar has appeared in the television shows Chakravakam and Mogali Rekulu. He has rejected movie offers from popular production houses citing time issues majorly due to his commitments on TV.

He played the lead role in the Telugu film Shaadi Mubarak, produced by Dil Raju and released in 2021. He then signed a film under the production of screenwriter B. V. S. Ravi.

== Personal life ==
Sagar married Soundarya in 2017. The couple has a son and a daughter.

== Filmography ==
Key
†	Denotes films that have not yet been released

Year	Film	Role	Notes	Ref.
2001	Manasantha Nuvve	Speaker	Uncredited role	
2011	Mr. Perfect	Shiva		
2016	Siddhartha	Surya / Siddhartha	Debut as lead role	
2018	Man of the Match	Abhi		
2021	Shaadi Mubarak	Madhav Sunnipenta		
2025	The 100	Vikranth		

=== Television ===
Year	Title	Role	Notes
2003	Amrutham	Unknown	Guest role
2006–2008	Chakravakam	Jagan	
2008–2013	Mogali Rekulu	RK Naidu, Munna/Mahidhar Naidu	

== Awards and nominations ==
Year	Award	Category	Work	Result	Ref.
2009	Nandi Awards	Best Television Actor	Mogali Rekulu	Won	
2017	South Indian International Movie Awards	Best Male Debut – Telugu	Siddhartha	Nominated	
