= Kalyani (TV series) =

- Genre: Drama; Romance; Family
- Written by: Munuswamy pulayalam Dialogues; Chandrasekhar Azad (1- 43); Karimulla (44-147); Srinivas Palapati (148-202)
- Screenplay by: Rahul varma Munuswamy pulayalam
- Directed by: Gopi Kasireddy (1- 43); Kola Nageswara Rao (44 -147); Meer Hussain (148- 202)
- Starring: Harika; Jay D'Souza; Priya; Vikas; Niharika
- Theme music composer: Leelamohan
- Opening theme: "Kadaliki kanulu" Malavika (vocals); Ramachandramouli (lyrics)
- Country of origin: India
- Original language: Telugu
- No. of seasons: 1
- No. of episodes: 202

Production
- Executive producer: Thuta Madhavudu
- Producers: Jasti Rabindranath Tagore; Jasti Sarath
- Cinematography: Nagendra Kumar Gummadi
- Editors: Samrat; Pasupuleti Gunasekhar
- Camera setup: Multi-camera
- Running time: 20-22 minutes
- Production companies: Shlok & Srinika Entertainments

Original release
- Network: Gemini TV
- Release: 17 June 2019 – 22 February 2020

Kalyani (Telugu: కళ్యాణి) was an Indian Telugu language soap opera that aired on Gemini TV from 17 June 2019 to 22 February 2020 every Monday to Saturday at 1:00PM IST. The serial starred Harika and Jay D'Souza as main protagonists and Jyothika, Priya, Vikas, and Niharika in pivotal roles.

== Plot ==
The story revolves around the blind girl Kalyani who is abandoned by her mother Tulasi Devi, the business women due to her birth defect. Besides Kalyani was raised by her grandparents with the help of her father, without knowing her mother is alive. Unfortunately the fate brought the Kalyani to meet her mother and later conflicts arrived between them. Tulasi Devi hates Kalyani. Will the mother and daughter meet despite their disputes is main crux of the story.

== Cast ==
- Harika Sadu as Kalyani
- Jay D'Souza as Aravind
- Jyothika Munirathnam as Neha
- Vikas as Raja Shekar (Kalyani and Neha's father)
- Mamilla Shailaja Priya as Tulasi Devi (Kalyani and Neha's mother)
- Niharika as Gayathri (Aravind's mother and Tulasi Devi's best friend) - deceased
- Rajendra as Bhupathi, Karthik's father and Tulasi Devi's rival
- Akhil Sarthak as Karthik
- Subha Aadiya

=== Former cast ===
- Prabhakar as Raja sekhar, Kalyani and Neha's father (replaced by Vikas)

== Airing history ==
The serial started airing on Gemini TV on 17 June 2019. It aired every Monday to Friday at 9:00PM IST. Later, a serial named Madhumasam replaced this show at 9:00PM and pushed this serial to 1:00PM IST from 2 September 2019. The serial ended on 22 February 2020 after airing 202 episodes.

== Special appearance ==
- Sampoornesh Babu in 46th episode
