= Mamilla Shailaja Priya =

Indian actress (born 1978)

Shailaja Priya
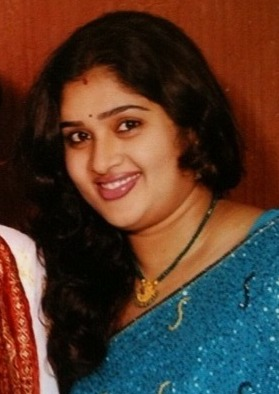
- Priya in 2011
- Born: 20 May 1981 (age 45); Bapatla, Andhra Pradesh, India
- Years active: 1997–2000; 2010–2023
- Spouse: Venkata Kishore Machiraju
- Children: 1
- Parents: Mamilla Venkateswar Rao; Kusuma Kumari

Mamilla Shailaja Priya (20 May 1981), popularly known as Priya, is an Indian actress. She appears primarily in Telugu feature films and television soap operas, and has also acted in Hindi and Tamil language films.

She made her acting debut in 1997 with the movie Master which featured Chiranjeevi. She has won the Nandi Award presented by the government of Andhra Pradesh for her role in this serial Priya Sakhi. Apart from soap operas, she has acted in about 200 feature films.

== Early and personal life ==
Popularly known as Priya, Mamilla Shailaja Priya was born in 1981, in Bapatla, Andhra Pradesh. Her parents are Mamilla Venkateswar Rao and Mamilla Kusuma Kumari. She is the third child, among three sisters. She did her schooling in Hyderabad, Telangana. While in college, she won the Miss College Pageant. She later started pursuing her acting career. She completed her graduation with a B.A. Priya married Venkata Kishore Machiraju in 2002. They have a son, Nischay, who was born in 2003. They resided in Hyderabad.

== Awards ==
She won Nandi Award presented by the government of Andhra Pradesh very early in her career. She was also the recipient of various awards like the Dasari Cultural Award, Swathi Cultural Award, and Vamsee Berkeley Award. She won the Cine Goers Award and Gemini Ugadi Puraskaram for her portrayal of the character Bhuvaneshwari in Kotha Bangaaram.

== Career ==
=== Television ===
She started her television career with the runaway hit Priya Sakhi in which she portrayed the lead role which had different shades(ranging from the young to the old).It was so popular that she is still identified as "Priyasakhi" Priya and the name stuck to her. She has acted in serials like Priya Ninu Choodaleka and Priya O Priya. Later, she has acted in almost all the leading Television channels in Telugu and Tamil. Her serials include Lady Detective, Sangarshana, Pelli Chesukundam & Jwaala for ETV, Dairy of Mrs Sharada & Kotha Bangaaram for Gemini TV, Maanasa for Maa TV, Vaidehi for Doordarshan, Chinna Kodalu for Zee TV, and Naagamma in Tamil for Sun TV. She has also done a Hindi serial titled Yehi hai Zindagi. She has also appeared in Vani Rani serial in Tamil which aired on Sun TV. She was acting in the serial Kalyani in Telugu which airs on Gemini TV and Piriyadha Varam Vendum and Chocolate in Tamil which airs on Zee Tamizh and Sun TV.

Santoor top 10 was a program anchored by Priya which ran for two years in Gemini Channel and she had portrayed different characters in each episode of the show. Similarly, Geethanjali was another music based show anchored by Priya for ETV and ran for a year. Endaro Mahanubhavulu is another show anchored by Priya which portrayed the achievements of various famous people in Andhra Pradesh from all walks of life.

She has appeared in commercials for brands like Chandana Brothers, Shakthi Gas, Til Sona Oil and Kanchan Mixer Grinder. She has been credited with the cover page of the most popular Telugu family magazine, Swathi. And also she was one of the 19 contestants in Bigg Boss Telugu 5

=== Films ===
She started her acting career with Chiranjeevi-starrer Master in 1997. In all, she has acted in about 60 feature films, often appearing alongside leading stars of Telugu film industry. She was a constant accompaniment to almost all the leading heroines in her movies. Some of her movies are Master & Annayya with Chiranjeevi, Gokulamlo Seetha with Pawan Kalyan, Chandra Lekha with Nagarjuna, Raja Kumarudu with Mahesh Babu, Jayam Manadera with Venkatesh and most importantly, Soorya Vamsham in Hindi Amithabh Bachchan.

Her other films include Taamboolalu, Pedda Manushulu, Maa Vidaakulu, Greeku Veerudu, Sakutumba Saparivara Samethamga, Velugu Needalu, Dongaata, Chiru Navvutho, Harishchandra, Madhuri, Manavudu Danavudu, Sambhavam and Kathi Kantha Rao. In 2012 she appeared in Nagarjuna's most acclaimed Dhamarukam. She played Richa Gangopadhyay's mother in Prabhas's Mirchi and appeared in Iddarammayilatho as mother of Catherine Tresa's character.

== Filmography ==
- Dongaata (1997) as Subbalakshmi's friend
- Gokulamlo Seeta (1997) as Sirisha's younger sister
- Master (1997)
- Maavidaakulu (1998)
- Sri Sita Ramula Kalyanam Chootamu Raarandi (1998) as Priya
- Chandralekha (1998) as Bangari
- Suryudu (1998)
- Suprabhatam (1998)
- Manasulo Maata (1999)
- Sooryavansham (1999 - Hindi)
- Raja Kumarudu (1999)
- Harischandraa (1999)
- Velugu Needalu (1999)
- Moodu Mukkalaata (2000)
- Annayya (2000)
- Jayam Manadera (2000) as Uma's friend
- Chiru Navvutho (2000) as Priya
- Kathi Kantha Rao (2010) as Kantha Rao's sister
- Damarukam (2012) as Mallikarjuna's mother
- Mirchi (2013) as Manasa's mother
- Iddarammayilatho (2013) as Akanksha's mother
- Pilla Nuvvu Leni Jeevitham (2014) as Parvati
- S/o Satyamurthy (2015) as Sameera's mother
- Dohchay (2015) as Chandu's mother
- Pandaga Chesko (2015) as Lakshmi
- Sher (2015) as Nandini’s mother
- Bengal Tiger (2015) as Siddappa's wife
- Kerintha (2015) as Sonia's mother
- Babu Bangaram (2016) as Mallesh Yadav's wife
- Hyper (2016) as Gaja's wife
- Winner (2017) as Rajeev Reddy's wife
- Rarandoi Veduka Chudham (2017) as Priya
- Prematho Mee Karthik (2017)
- Mersal (2017 - Tamil) as Tara's mother
- Pantham (2018) as Akshara's mother
- Aatagallu (2018) as Anjali's mother
- Srinivasa Kalyanam (2018) as Vasu's aunt
- Nartanasala (2018) as Radha's mother
- Nela Ticket (2018) as Old man's daughter-in-law
- Jai Simha (2018) as Raju Reddy's wife
- Venky Mama (2019) as Harika's mother
- Alludu Adhurs (2021) as Gaja's sister
- Zombie Reddy (2021) as Mario's mother
- Uppena (2021) as Raayanam's sister
- Sreekaram (2021) as Ekambaram's wife
- Chakravyuham: The Trap (2023) as Shakunthala Devi
- Samajavaragamana (2023) as Maheshwari
- Sound Party (2023) as Dhanalakshmi
- Sri Sri Sri Raja Vaaru (2025) as Raja’s mother
- Anaganaga Oka Raju (2026) as Raju’s mother

== Television ==
=== Telugu ===
==== Serials ====
- Priya Sakhi (Gemini TV)
- Priya Ninu Choodaleka
- Priya O Priya
- Sangarshana (ETV)
- Pelli Chesukundam (ETV)
- Jwaala (ETV)
- Dairy of Mrs Sharada (Gemini TV)
- Kotha Bangaaram (Gemini TV)
- Maanasa (Maa TV)
- Chinna Kodalu (Zee Telugu)
- Sasirekha Parinayam (Maa TV)
- Kalyani (Gemini TV) as Tulasi Devi
- No. 1 Kodalu (Zee Telugu) as Shambhavi
- Nandhini vs Nandhini (ETV)
- Krishna Mukunda Murari (Star Maa)
- Vontari Gulabi (GeminiTV) as Sridevi
- Krishna Mukunda Murari (Maa TV)

==== Shows ====
- Santoor Top 10 (Gemini TV)
- Geethanjali (ETV)
- Endaro Mahanubhavulu
- Bigg Boss Telugu 5

=== Tamil ===
Year	Title	Role	Channel
1998	Vaidehi		Doordarshan
2011–2012	Naagamma		Sun TV
2017–2018	Vani Rani	Akhilandeshwari	Sun TV
2019–2020	Piriyadha Varam Vendum	Chitra	Zee Tamil
2019–2020	Chocolate	Renuka	Sun TV
