= Manohari (song) =

2015 song by Mohana Bhogaraju and LV Revanth

- Cover of the song, featuring actor Prabhas and Rana Daggubati

Song by Mohana Bhogaraju, LV Revanth

from the album Baahubali: The Beginning
- Released: 31 May 2015
- Genre: Soundtrack, pop-folk
- Length: 3:52
- Label: Lahari Music
- Songwriter: Chaitanya Prasad

Music video
- "Manohari" on YouTube

"Manohari" (lit. ' "Heart-stealing", also "Charming", "Delightful"') is an Indian Telugu-language item number from the 2014 soundtrack Baahubali: The Beginning from the film of the same name. The song is sung by Mohana Bhogaraju and L. V. Revanth and has its lyrics written by Chaitanya Prasad. The music video of the track features Prabhas, who plays Amarendra Baahubali, disguised as a Middle Eastern Man dancing with Scarlett Mellish Wilson, Nora Fatehi and Madhu Sneha Upadhyay in cameo roles, while Rana Daggubati as Bhallaladeva tries to catch the spy who was being followed by him and Amarendra Baahubali. Director SS Rajamouli has a cameo role as the bartender during the premise of the song. Nora Fatehi faced a wardrobe malfunction while shooting for the song.

== Music video ==
=== Synopsis ===
The song is played after Bahubali and Bhallaladeva visit Sighapura in search of a traitor known as Saketudu / Sahithan. The song was originally filmed in Telugu, with many parts re-shot in Tamil.

== Release ==
The audio of the song was released on 31 May 2015 along with other tracks on the album. The music video of the song was officially released on 20 July 2015 through the YouTube channel of T-Series Telugu. The video of the song received more than 18 million views on YouTube.

The song was released in Tamil as "Manogari", In Hindi as "Manohari" and in Malayalam as "Manohari".
