= Mohana Bhogaraju =

Indian playback singer

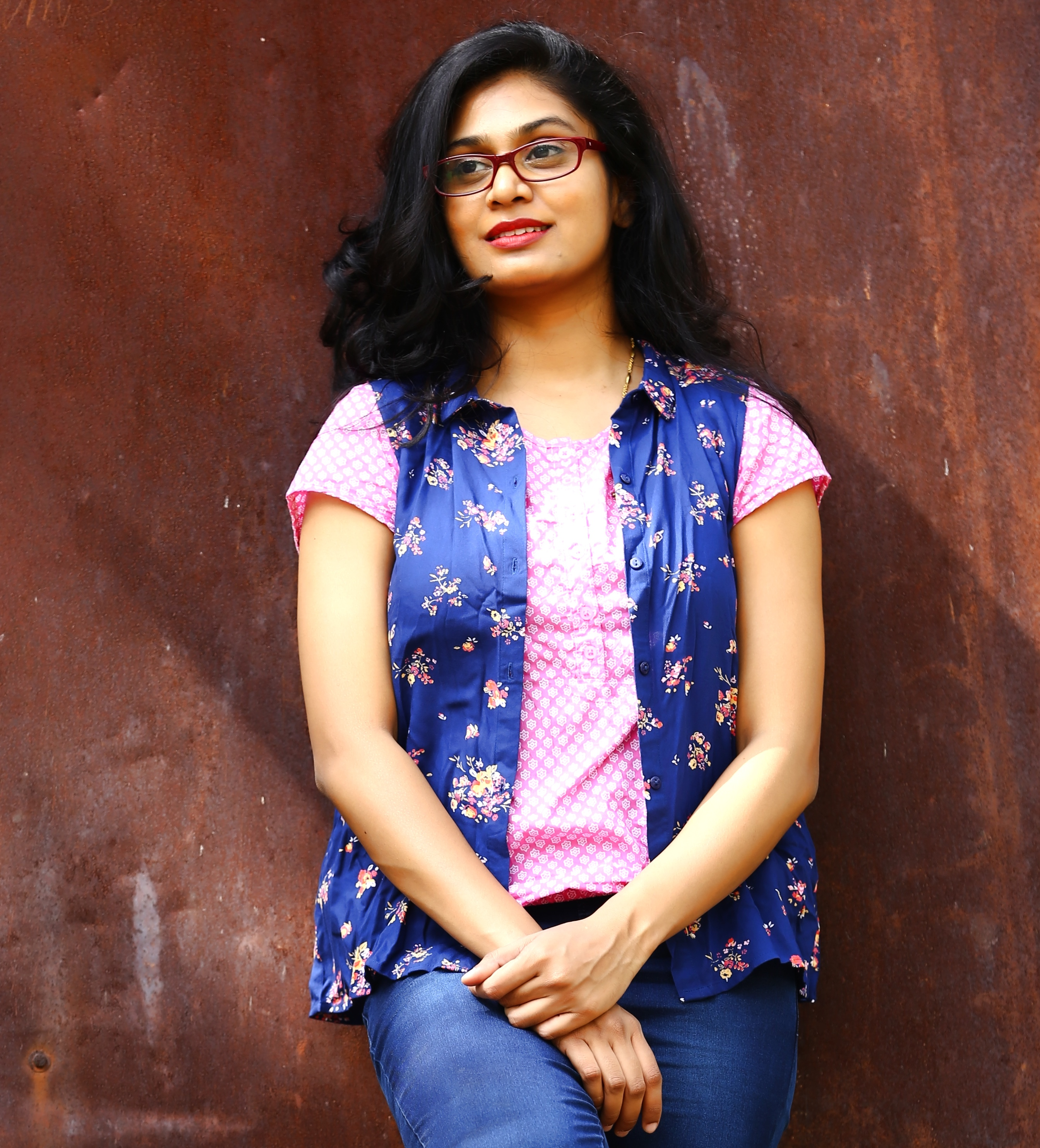
- Mohana in 2018

Background information
- Born: Eluru, Andhra Pradesh, India
- Occupation: playback singer
- Instrument: Vocals
- Years active: 2013–present

Mohana Bhogaraju is an Indian playback singer who has recorded songs in Telugu-language films. She gained recognition with the song "Manohari" from the film Baahubali: The Beginning for which she won the Radio Mirchi–Mirchi Music upcoming female vocalist 2015 award in Telugu Cinema.

== Early life ==
Bhogaraju was born in Eluru, Andhra Pradesh, but her family is settled in Hyderabad. She completed her bachelor's degree from Bhojreddy Engineering College and MBA from Osmania University. Since childhood, Bhogaraju has always had a fascination towards music and participated in many competitions held at schools and at various ethnic auditoriums such as Ravindra Bharati, Thyagaraja Ghana Sabha. She began singing at the age of 6. She received her first award from the former Assembly Speaker D. Sripada Rao at the age of 8.

== Musical career ==
Bhogaraju started her career in 2013. She has sung her first song "Sayyama Masam" in the 2013 Telugu film Jai Sriram. She gained recognition by singing "Manohari" from. Baahubali: The Beginning. Her song "Bhale Bhale Magadivoy" from the film Bhale Bhale Magadivoy was charted in Radio Mirchi. She has given her voice in more than 100 Telugu films.

== Awards and nominations ==
- Radio Mirchi Music - Upcoming Female Vocalist award for the song "Manohari" from the film Baahubali: The Beginning (2015).
- Nominated for Filmfare Award for Best Female Playback Singer – Telugu for the song "Size Sexy" from the film Size Zero (2015)
- TSR - TV9 Special Jury Award for the Song "Reddammathalli" from the film Aravinda Sametha Veera Raghava (2018).
- Nominated for Filmfare Award for Best Female Playback Singer – Telugu for the song "Redamma Thalli" from the film Aravinda Sametha Veera Raghava (2019)
- Nominated for SIIMA Award for Best Female Playback Singer – Telugu for the song "Oo Bava" from the film Prati Roju Pandage (2021)

== Discography ==
=== As a playback singer ===
Year	Movie	Language	Song	Composer
2013	Jai Sriram	Telugu	"Sayyama Masam"	Dhake
2014	Dikkulu Choodaku Ramayya	Telugu	"Antha Premanthe"	M. M. Keeravani
2014	Loukyam	Telugu	"Ninnu Chudagane"	Anup Rubens
2015	Baahubali: The Beginning	Telugu	"Manohari"	M. M. Keeravani
2015	Baahubali: The Beginning	Tamil	"Manogari"	M. M. Keeravani
2015	Bhale Bhale Magadivoy	Telugu	"Bhale Bhale Magadivoy"	Gopi Sundar
2015	Size Zero	Telugu	"Size Sexy"	M. M. Keeravani
2015	Inji Iduppazhagi	Tamil	"Kannaalam"	M. M. Keeravani
2015	Akhil	Telugu	"Akkineni Akkineni"	Anup Rubens
2015	Akhil	Tamil	"Akkineni Akkineni"	Anup Rubens
2015	Lacchimdeviki O Lekkundi	Telugu	"Maskesko"	M. M. Keeravani
2015	Lacchimdeviki O Lekkundi	Telugu	"Ankalamma, Umadevi"	M. M. Keeravani
2015	Soukhyam	Telugu	"You are my honey"	Anup Rubens
2016	Soggade Chinni Nayana	Telugu	"Dikka Dikka Dum Dum"	Anup Rubens
2016	Right Right	Telugu	"Rangu Rangula"	JB
2016	Lee	Kannada	"Bunga Bunga"	Anand Rajavikraman
2016	Nagabharanam (Dubbed version)	Telugu	"Naagini"	Gurukiran
2016	Ism	Telugu	"Kanulu Navaina"	Anup Rubens
2017	Sathamanam Bhavati	Telugu	"Mellaga Tellarindoi"	Mickey J. Meyer
2017	Sathamanam Bhavati	Telugu	"Hailo Hailessare"	Mickey J. Meyer
2017	Om Namo Venkatesaya	Telugu	"Anda Pinda"	M. M. Keeravani
2017	Luckunnodu	Telugu	"Aisa laga"	Praveen Lakkaraju
2017	Mister	Telugu	"Neemeedha Manasaayara"	Mickey J. Meyer
2017	Mister	Telugu	"Jhoomore Jhoomore"	Mickey J. Meyer
2017	Baahubali 2: The Conclusion	Tamil	"Orey Oar Ooril"	M. M. Keeravani
2017	Jawaan	Telugu	"Bomma Adirindhi"	S. Thaman
2017	Nakshatram	Telugu	"Time Ledu Guru"	Bheems Ceciroleo
2017	Gulf	Telugu	"Sufi Song (Allah)"	Praveen Immadi
2017	Lacchi	Telugu	"Nene Nene"	Suresh Yuvan
2017	Showtime	Telugu	"Messenger of Death"	M. M. Keeravani
2017	Showtime	Telugu	"Showtime"	M. M. Keeravani
2018	Bhaagamathie	Telugu	"Bhaagamathie"	S. Thaman
2018	Baahubali Ost Vol 3	Telugu	"Baahubali – The Story"	M. M. Keeravani
2018	Achari America Yatra	Telugu	"Swamy Ra Ra"	S. Thaman
2018	Mahanati	Telugu	"Mahanati"	Mickey J. Meyer
2018	Naa Peru Surya	Telugu	"Iraga Iraga"	Vishal–Shekhar
2018	Raju Gadu	Telugu	"Sarasaku Ra"	Gopi Sundar
2018	Shailaja Reddy Alludu	Telugu	"Gold Rangu Pilla"	Gopi Sundar
2018	Aravinda Sametha Veera Raghava	Telugu	"Reddamma Thalli"	S. Thaman
2018	Savyasachi	Telugu	"Song of Savyasachi"	M. M. Keeravani
2018	Savyasachi	Telugu	"Oopiri Ukkiribikkiri"	M. M. Keeravani
2018	Amar Akbar Anthony	Telugu	"Khullam Khulla Chilla"	S. Thaman
2018	Bluff Master	Telugu	"Satkarmabhista"	Sunil Kashyap
2019	N.T.R: Kathanayakudu	Telugu	"Kathanayaka"	M. M. Keeravani
2019	N.T.R: Mahanayakudu	Telugu	"Rajarshi"	M. M. Keeravani
2019	Lakshmi's NTR	Telugu	"Vijayam"	Kalyani Malik
2019	Rangasthala (Dubbed version)	Kannada	"Jil Jil Jilebi Rani"	Devi Sri Prasad
2019	Oh! Baby	Telugu	"Naalo Maimarapu"	Mickey J. Meyer
2019	Dear Comrade	Tamil	"Gira Gira"	Justin Prabhakaran
2019	iSmart Shankar	Telugu	"Bonalu"	Mani Sharma
2019	Guna 369	Telugu	"Usuremo"	Chaitan Bharadwaj
2019	Venky Mama	Telugu	"Venky Mama Title Song"	S. Thaman
2019	Prati Roju Pandage	Telugu	“Oo Baava”	S. Thaman
2019	Iddari Lokam Okate	Telugu	“Anaganaga”	Mickey J. Meyer
2020	HIT: The First Case	Telugu	“Ventaade Gaayam”	Vivek Sagar
2020	30 Rojullo Preminchadam Ela	Telugu	"Meeko Dhandam"	Anup Rubens
2020	GEM	Telugu	"Edo Edo Adagalani Anipisthundhi"	Sunil Kashyap
2021	Sreekaram	Telugu	"Sandalle Sandalle"	Mickey J. Meyer
2021	Radha Krishna	Telugu	"Yevade"	M. M. Srilekha
2021	Vakeel Saab	Telugu	"Maguva Maguva (Female Version)"	S. Thaman
2021	Tuck Jagadish	Telugu	"Neeti Neeti Sukka"	S. Thaman
2021	Ardha Shathabdham	Telugu	"Errani Sooreede"	Nawfal raja AIS
2021	Raja Raja Chora	Telugu	"Raja Raju Vacche"	Vivek Sagar
2021	Meenakshi Sundareshwar	Hindi	"Tittar Bittar"	Justin Prabhakaran
2021	Arjuna Phalguna	Telugu	"Kaapadeva Raapadeva"	Priyadarshan Balasubramanian
2021	Akhanda	Telugu	"Amma Song"	S. Thaman
2022	Mr. Pregnant	Telugu	"Katha Veruntadhi"	Shravan Bharadwaj
2022	Bangarraju	Telugu	"Vaasivaadi Tassadiyya"	Anup Rubens
2022	Bheemla Nayak	Telugu	"O Sandamama"	S. Thaman
2022	Mr. King	Telugu	"Raa Raa Naa Mama"	Mani Sharma
2023	Bimbisara	Telugu	"Neetho Unte Chalu"	M M Keeravani
2024	Kali	Telugu	"Pranam Leni Nee Payanam"	Jeevan Babu
2024	Aho Vikramaarka	Telugu	"Salma"	Arko Pravo Mukherjee
2025	Hari Hara Veera Mallu: Part 1 (Dubbed version)	Hindi	"Udaa Ke Le Gayi"	M M Keeravani
2025	Hari Hara Veera Mallu: Part 1 (Dubbed version)	Malayalam	"Kaddhukondu Hodhalo"	M M Keeravani

=== Singles ===
Year	Title	Language	Music director	Notes
2019	"Sohne Sohne"	Punjabi	Desi Routz	
2021	"Bullettu Bandi"	Telugu	SK Baji	
2023	"Malle Raja"	Telugu	Desi Routz	
