= Ravi Krishna (actor, born 1989) =

Indian actor, born 1989

- Born: Thota Ravi Krishna; 9 June 1989 (age 37); Vijayawada, Andhra Pradesh, India
- Occupation: Actor
- Years active: 2004–present

Thota Ravi Krishna is an Indian actor works in Telugu films and television shows. He is known for television shows Mogali Rekulu (2008–2013), Varudhini Parinayam (2013–2016) and Aame Katha (2019–2021). He has debuted in cinema with a supporting role in Anubhavinchu Raja (2021) and got his breakthrough in Virupaksha (2023). He later did lead role in The Birthday Boy (2024).

== Early life ==
Ravikrishna was born on 9 June 1989 in Vijayawada, Andhra Pradesh. After completing his degree, he went to Chennai with an interest in acting and joined as an assistant director.

== Career ==
He started his career as an assistant director in Vijetha of ETV and later came to Hyderabad and worked as an assistant director again. Then as a replacement hero at the end of the serial called Bommarillu, he was selected as the lead actor for which he was already working as the assistant director. He then acted in a few independent films.

After a long break, he was selected in the auditions and acted in the popular drama series Mogali Rekulu. Then he starred in some Telugu TV shows but became known with the soap opera Varudhini Parinayam and later became well known in the series That Is Mahalakshmi, Srinivasa Kalyanam, Sundarakanda, Bava Maradallu.

In 2020, he was affected with Coronavirus disease.

== Filmography ==
Key
†	Denotes films that have not yet been released

List of acting roles in films
Year	Title	Role	Notes	Ref.
2021	Anubhavinchu Raja	Rahul		
2023	Virupaksha	Bhairava/Kumar	Nominated–SIIMA Award for Best Supporting Actor – Telugu	
2024	Geethanjali Malli Vachindi	Ushaanjali's Boyfriend		
2024	Aa Okati Adakku	Subramanyam		
2024	Love Me	Prathap		
2024	The Birthday Boy	Bharat	Debut in lead role	
2025	Kingdom	Selva		
2025	Dhandoraa	Ravi		
TBA	SDT18 †	TBA		

=== Television ===
List of television appearances
Year	Title	Role	Network	Notes	Ref
2004	Hrudayam	Jaswanth	ETV	Debut in Television	
2007	Bommarillu	Gautham	ETV	Debut as a lead actor	
2008–2013	Mogali Rekulu	Durga	Gemini TV		
2013–2016	Varudhini Parinayam	Krishna Chaitanya a.k.a. Paradhu	Zee Telugu		
2014	Wow S2	Himself	ETV	Game show	
2014	Great Game Show	Himself	Tollywood TV	Game show	
2015–2016	Srinivasa Kalyanam	Srinivas	Star Maa		
2016	KTUC Super Sundays	Himself	Zee Telugu	Episode 9; Talk show	
2016	Big Celebrity Challenge	Himself	Zee Telugu		
2016	Cinema Choopistha Maava	Himself	ETV Plus		
2016	Cash S1	Himself	ETV		
2016–2019	Manasu Mamata	Siddu/Anand	ETV	Dual role	
2017–2018	That is Mahalakshmi	Sree	Zee Telugu		
2018	Vachhadayyo Swami	Himself	ETV	Telefilm	
2018	Cash S2	Himself	ETV		
2018	Gold Rush	Himself	Zee Telugu		
2018–2019	Sundarakhanda	Abhiram	Star Maa		
2018–2020	Bava Maradallu	Srinivas	Zee Telugu		
2019	Bigg Boss 3	Himself	Star Maa		
2019	Bigg Boss 3 Buzz	Himself	Star Maa Music		
2019	F3-Fun, Frustration & Family	Himself	Star Maa		
2019-2021	Aame Katha	Gautham	Star Maa		
2019	Start Music	Himself	Star Maa		
2019	Sixth Sense S3	Himself	Star Maa		
2020	Jaatharoo Jaathara	Himself	Zee Telugu	Telefilm	
	Cash S2	Himself	ETV		
	Wow S3	Himself	ETV		
2022	Star Maa Parivaar League S2	Himself	Star Maa		
2022	Dhee	Himself	ETV		
2023	BB Jodi	Himself	Star Maa		

== See also ==
- List of Indian television actors
- Lists of Indian actors
