= Chakravakam (TV series) =

- Created by: Srikanth Entertainment Pvt. Ltd
- Written by: Bindu Naidu
- Story by: Yaddanapudi Sulochana Rani
- Directed by: Manjula Naidu
- Starring: Indraneeil; Prithi Amin; Kaushal Manda; Likitha; Ramaprabha; Sagar; Selvaraj; A.R.C. Babu
- Opening theme: Chakravakam
- Country of origin: India
- Original language: Telugu
- No. of episodes: 1,237

Production
- Producer: Sudhakar Pallamala
- Running time: 15-20 minutes

Original release
- Network: Gemini TV
- Release: 3 November 2003 – 15 February 2008

Related
- Ruthuragalu; Mogali Rekulu, Agni Poolu

Chakravakam was an Indian Telugu-language soap opera created by Manjula Naidu. The show aired on Gemini TV.

The dubbed version of this serial translated into Malayalam, aired on Surya TV while a version translated into Kannada entitled Chakravaka airs in Udaya TV.

A repeat telecast of the show first aired on 11 July 2016 at 2:30pm on Gemini TV. A total of 1,111 episodes have aired thus far.

== Plot ==
Gemini describes the serial as "a high-power emotional drama" that confronts the basic question of whether love can survive when our children and parents cannot live up to our expectations. The serial showcases two generations. The first generation revolves around the story of Sravanthi and Indra. The second generation revolves around Irfan, Vennela, Sameera, and Jagan.

Sravanthi is a kindhearted girl, who falls in love with Indra post her engagement with a person of her parents' choice and eventually ends up marrying Bhargav. Indra who was unaware of Sravanthi's engagement, expresses his love to her, then feels cheated on knowing about Sravanthi's marriage with Bhargav. He goes away to Kolkata to remove Sravanthi from his life and ends up proposing to Gayathri - who is suffering from a heart disease. Sravanthi after facing torture in her short marriage, seeks Indra and makes him aware that she is still in love with him and never intends to cheat him.

Sravanthi and Indra elope and marry, deciding to keep it a secret from their families until Gayathri's heart surgery is done. But James, Gayathri's father finds out and reveals the truth to her. Gayathri, feeling betrayed, decides to kill Sravanthi. James, without explaining the wrong direction Gayathri is going in, helps her by asking his close friend Wilson to kidnap and kill Sravanthi. Wilson sends his adopted son Iqbal to kidnap Sravanthi, who is now pregnant with Indra's child. Everyone is informed that Sravanthi is dead.

Slowly, Iqbal develops compassion towards Sravanthi's kind nature and forms a deep bond of friendship with her. When Sravanthi goes into labour, Wilson orders Iqbal to not take Sravanthi to hospital, and instead let the mother and foetus die, but Iqbal goes against this and saves the mother and child. Sravanthi gives birth to a baby girl and Iqbal names her Zubeida, after his late sister.

Meanwhile, Indra gets into an accident and loses his memory of marrying Sravanthi. Gayathri convinces Indra to marry her, and Indra remembers everything on the day of their wedding. Indra's father backs him and tells him not to marry Gayathri and asks him to find out the truth of what happened to Sravanthi. Sravanthi and Iqbal live in the house of Raghavamma under the disguise of Sameera and Rahim respectively. Raghavamma's granddaughter Meghamala is infatuated with Iqbal/Rahim.

One day, Iqbal saves Meghamala from Vinod, who eve teases her and Iqbal thrashes him. Vinod meets Salim, a goon working for Wilson. Salim, envious of Wilson and Iqbal's father/son relationship, decides to take this chance to kill Iqbal and attacks Sravanthi and Iqbal/Rahim and severely injures them. Meghamala witnesses this and tells Raghavamma who immediately joins them in a hospital and asks her son, a minister, to protect them at any cost. Wilson learns of all this and comes to the hospital and a small argument ensues.

Indra by now has found out Sravanthi is alive and has given birth to their daughter. He calls Sravanthi and with the help of Raghavamma, comes to the hospital and meets Sravanthi. They hatch a plan to make everyone believe Sravanthi is dead and keep Sravanthi safe in a farmhouse. Indra starts searching for Zubeida, who is in an orphanage with Rajesh, Wilson's own son, unbeknownst to Wilson about his son. Wilson forgives Iqbal and brings him back home with him where Gayathri continues to insult Iqbal and Sravanthi's friendship. When everyone finds out the truth about Sravanthi, Wilson reunites Zubeida and Sravanthi with Indra whom brings them both home.

Gayathri goes into a mental shock and James expels Hema, his wife, from his house for aiding Sravanthi and Indra instead of them. James takes care of Gayathri, who does not take her medication and one day goes to Sravanthi and Indra's house when they are not at home, by contacting Indra's mother who is in favour of Gayathri. Gayathri destroys Indra and Sravanthi's room, kidnaps Zubeida and James gives Zubeida to an orphanage and pays them to be silent and to take care of her.

Indra and Sravanthi beg Gayathri to give back their daughter, but Gayathri sadistically asks a pregnant Sravanthi to touch her feet but still does not reveal the location of Zubeida. To teach James a lesson, Iqbal and Indra kidnap Gayathri, and James still does not reveal the location of Zubeida. They lie that Zubeida died in an accident and Sravanthi breaks down. They file a case against James and Gayathri. When James is about to be sentenced for aiding Gayathri in her crimes for seven years, Gayathri reveals the truth to everyone in the court, snatches a revolver from the nearby constable, tries to shoot Sravanthi, but Iqbal saves her and dies. Gayathri is sentenced to a fourteen-year prison sentence for all her crimes. She tells James to keep Zubeida in a locked room, so that Sravanthi and their daughter will be separated and live in a jail-like cell, for sending Gayathri to jail.

Swapna, wife of Iqbal, gave birth to Irfan, their son. Angry that Iqbal died to protect Sravanthi, Swapna asks Sravanthi to stay away from her and Irfan. Sravanthi is heartbroken and decides to go away to Australia and convinces Indra and her family.

Irfan tries to attack James and Gayathri for killing Iqbal but is tied up as they think he is a thief. He meets Zubeida in captivity, who frees him by breaking his ties, and after coming back, he tells all this to Indumati, who decides to send him away for his studies and to protect him.

Sravanthi and Indra are living in Australia now and have a daughter and a son, Sameera, and Arjun, and presume Zubeida is dead. Sameera applies for a medicine seat in Hyderabad and convinces Sravanthi and Indra to come to India, who do not tell her of their past. Zubeida is in the captivity of James and Gayathri. Irfan returns to India, takes all the land James wants to buy along with his close friend and ally Ganesh for revenge, saves Zubeida, and names her Vennela. Irfan and Vennela fall in love and they get married.

Sameera comes to India and lives with Raghavamma. Irfan and Sameera become best friends from enemies, and Sagar and Sameera are in a relationship. Rekha, childhood friend of Sagar, loves Sagar and Sagar's brother Rahul is a close ally of James. As Rekha is rich, Rahul and Sagar's mother wants Rekha to marry Sagar. Sagar, jealous of the growing friendship between Sameera and Irfan, badly beats her up and tries to rape her, and while escaping she falls down a flight of stairs and her leg is broken. Due to this, Sameera breaks off her marriage to Sagar. James frames Sameera in a narcotics case and Sagar's family emotionally blackmails him into marrying Rekha.

Irfan and Wilson help Sameera to get released from jail. Rekha tests HIV positive and everyone except Sagar, Rahul, and Sameera shun her and mistreat her. Jagan comes to meet Wilson and threatens Sameera asking for Wilson and Sameera pushes him in self-defense. Jagan gets a head injury and loses his memory. Sameera asks Irfan's help to save Jagan, and it is revealed that Jagan falsely testified against Sameera as a witness in the drugs case and later rescinded it after being blackmailed. Rekha realises the kind nature of Sameera and decides to reunite Sagar and Sameera, who have broken up due to Sagar's violent nature, a misunderstanding caused by Rekha in between the two and Sagar sleeping with Rekha while being in a relationship with Sameera. Sameera refuses to the union.

Banerjee wants to kill Jagan. James, Gayathri, and DIG Sreenivas, wanting revenge on Irfan, provoke Banerjee into attacking Wilson, who gets Banerjee arrested. Banerjee tells Wilson and Irfan that Jagan killed his son and his wife died of shock. Wilson, having lost Iqbal similarly decides to hand over Jagan to Banerjee. Seeing Sameera in danger, Jagan decides to surrender but falls unconscious and remembers his past. It is revealed that Banerjee killed Jagan's parents when they found out about the wrongdoings of Banerjee, took in Jagan, and found out that Jagan collected proof against him, Banerjee planted a bomb in his car and killed his own son, and his wife died due to shock. Sagar, seeing Jagan and Sameera close in college, violently takes her to a secluded place, attacks her, and while trying to escape Sameera gets badly injured and goes into a coma. Irfan finds out the truth, Indra gets Sagar arrested and Rekha takes Sravanthi's side. After Sameera gains consciousness, they decide to take the case back to save Sagar's career and warn him not to repeat this with anyone else or they will go to court next time. Sagar realises his love for Rekha, and Rahul insults Sameera in college.

Despite all this, Jagan and Sameera fall in love, while Sravanthi finds out Zubeida/Vennela is her daughter. Vennela gives birth to her and Irfan's son Iqbal, and she is taken to Australia. Wilson makes everyone believe Vennela is dead, makes James believe he killed her, and gets James and Gayathri arrested for all their wrongdoings. They discover that Vennela is alive. James, unable to bear that Gayathri may kill herself due to her mental imbalance and staying away from James, begs Wilson and Indra's father to take back the case. They see the condition of Gayathri and out of humanity take the case back with a warning to James to never come near them again. James takes Gayathri to America after trying to search for Hema, writes a letter to Indra's father and sends a bouquet to Sameera and Jagan for their wedding, and writes in the letter expressing regret for his actions all these years, asks him to take care of Gayathri if anything happens to James. Jagan and Sameera get married and Chakravam comes to a happy end.

== Cast ==
- Preeti Amin as Sravanthi (first generation)
- Indraneeil as Indra (first generation)
- Selvaraj as Iqbal, Irfan
- Pavani as Gayatri
- Preeti Nigam as Sravanthi (second generation)
- Jackie as Indra (second generation)
- BHEL Prasad as Wilson
- Sruthi as Indhumathi
- Suresh as Bhargav Ram, Sravanthi's 1st husband
- Indu Anand as Laxmi, Indra's mother
- Nagamani as Annapurna, Bhargav Ram's mother
- Uma Maheshwari as Kalyani
- Athili Laxmi as Amrutha, Valli Sravanthi's grand mother
- Shravani as Sindhu, Sravanthi's friend
- Madhumani as Lavanya
- Amma Ramesh as Kiran, Lavanya's husband
- Baby Harshitha as Rittu kiran's daughter
- Vanaja as Hima, Sravanthi's elder sister
- Manjusha as Suma, Sravanthi's younger sister
- Pavitra Anand as Jaya, Indra's friend
- Vijya Rani as Radhamma
- Indira as Shoba Rani
- Janardhan as Krishna Murthy
- Vijay as Rajesh Wilson's son
- Rama Krishna as Shiva Prasad
- Gaurinad as Gangadhar Home minister
- Satya Priya as Leela
- Rajesh as Praveen, Indra's brother
- Suchitra as Shalini, Indra's sister
- Koteshwar Rao as Kalyan, Indra's friend
- Malikarjun as Sheshu
- Rama krishna as Ram Mohan
- Muskan Chowdary as Megha Maala
- Swetha, Jaya shree, Swapna as Swapna, Irfan's mother
- Kaushal Manda as Sagar
- Sagar as Jagan aka Daya and Vinod ( in few episodes as swapna's friend)
- Likitha as Sameera
- Ramaprabha as Raghavamma
- Medha as Vennela
- A.R.C. Babu as Raghu Varma, Indra's father
- Arvind Nomula as Sagar (in a few episodes)
- Narasimha Raju as Sravanthi's father
- Meghana Raami as Sravanthi's mother
- Shanoor Sana as Hema gayatri's mother
- Madhusudhan Rao as James, Gayatri's father

== Awards ==
Chakravakam topped the poll in the Andhra Pradesh Cinegoers' Television Awards in 2006, winning seven awards including the best actress award and best character actor and actress. The previous November, the serial won a best male playback singer award at the Nandi Awards.
