= Madhumasam (TV series) =

- Genre: Drama; Family
- Written by: Priyaaramanadhan; Dialogues; Narasimha Murthy Nallam (1-35); Veeresh Kanche (36 - 174)
- Screenplay by: Deepika Agarwal; Rajan Agarwal
- Directed by: Dinesh Painoor (1-61); Jayaprasad K (62-174)
- Creative director: Ramvenki kancharana
- Starring: Swetha khelge Suraj lokre Haritha; Vyshnavi; Lakshmi
- Theme music composer: Meenakshi Bhujangam
- Opening theme: "Omkaraniki Aakaram"; Sagar Narayana (lyrics)
- Country of origin: India
- Original language: Telugu
- No. of episodes: 174

Production
- Executive producer: Balu Pamidikondala
- Producers: Siddharth Malhotra; Sapna Malhotra
- Cinematography: Prakash Kotla
- Editor: Satish Kulkarni Anugonda
- Camera setup: Multi-camera
- Running time: 20-22 minutes
- Production company: Alchemy Films Pvt Ltd

Original release
- Network: Gemini TV
- Release: 2 September 2019 – 27 March 2020

Madhumasam was an Indian Telugu language soap opera directed by Jayaprasad K aired on Gemini TV from 2 September 2019 to 27 March 2020 every Monday to Saturday at 7.30PM IST. The serial starred Swetha Khelge, Suraj Lokre as main protagonists and Vyshnavi, Lakshmi, Haritha in pivotal roles.

== Plot ==
The story revolves around the girl Shravya, who is leading an independent life on her own terms. She has a traumatic past as her dad married another woman. On the other hand her step mother Annapoorna devi is so loving and caring towards Shravya as she promised to Shravya's biological mother. Shravya has issues with her step mother and she misunderstood her parents as she is unaware of past and promise between her mother and stepmother. She behaves very rude with her parents. But she agreed to marry on the condition of getting separated with parents. She learned of her stepmother's love and the past because of her aunt at her marriage venue. Unexpectedly her parents died in an accident on the same day and she became the custodian to her two sisters and brother. Now how Shravya become a mother overnight and is faced with the accompanying responsibilities. Her choice between responsibility and love form crux of the story.

== Cast ==
- Swetha Khelge as Shravya
- Suraj Lokre as Nanda Gopal, a gentleman and business partner of Vishwanadh
- Vyshnavi as Nithya
- Ishika as Satya
- Master Rishi as Kireeti (Dumbu)
- Manoj as Jayanth
- Lakshmi as Bhanumathi, Nanda Gopal's mother
- Karate Kalyani as Anjali Devi (Mahesh and Rohan's mother)
- Sravan as Rohan
- Niharika as Chaitrika, Nandu's sister
- Lakshmi Priya (Buchibabu and Achibabu's mother)
- Surya Teja as Buchibabu
- Vivareddy as Achibabu
- Shakuntala as Subbu
- Sathwik as Arjun, CBI Officer
- Anjali as Lavanya
- Padmavathi as Satyavathi, Shravya's aunt

=== Former cast ===
- Haritha as Annapoorna devi (Nithya Satya and Dumbu's mother, Shravya's foster mother)
- Sri charan as Viswanadh (Shravya, Nithya, Satya and Dumbu's father)
- Manasa Harika as Satya (replaced by Ishika)
- Ashmita Karnani as Bhanumathi, Nanda Gopal's mother (replaced by Lakshmi)
- Dinil Rahul as Mahesh, Nitya's friend
- Sravanthi as Vasundhara, Shravya's biological mother (Cameo appearance)
- Baby krithika as Shravya at childhood (Cameo appearance)
