= Evol =

Evol may refer to:

- Evol, Japanese manga by Atsushi Kaneko
- EVOL (Sonic Youth album), 1986
- Evol (Future album), 2016
- EVOL (film), a 2024 Indian Telugu-language film
- EvoL, South Korean girl group
- "E.V.O.L.", a song by Marina and the Diamonds
- Kamen Rider Evol, the main antagonist of Kamen Rider Build, a Japanese tokusatsu series
