= Middle Class Melodies =

- Official release poster
- Directed by: Vinod Anantoju
- Screenplay by: Janardhan Pasumarthi; Vinod Anantoju
- Story by: Janardhan Pasumarthi
- Produced by: V. Anand Prasad
- Starring: Anand Deverakonda; Varsha Bollamma
- Cinematography: Sunny Kurapati
- Edited by: Ravi Teja Girijala
- Music by: RH Vikram
- Production company: Bhavya Creations
- Distributed by: Amazon Prime Video
- Release date: 20 November 2020
- Running time: 135 minutes
- Country: India
- Language: Telugu

Middle Class Melodies is a 2020 Indian Telugu-language comedy drama film directed by debutante Vinod Anantoju, who wrote it with Janardhan Pasumarthi. The film stars Anand Deverakonda and Varsha Bollamma while Chaitanya Garikipati, Divya Sripada, Goparaju Ramana, Surabhi Prabhavati and Prem Sagar play supporting roles. The film was released on Amazon Prime Video on 20 November 2020 to positive reviews from critics and audience. It also won the state Gaddar Award for Third Best Feature Film.

== Plot ==
Raghava runs a breakfast center in his village along with his father, Kondal Rao. Raghava, who believes in his ability to make the famed Bombay chutney, dreams of starting a hotel and making it big in the nearby city, Guntur. But Kondal Rao is against any such idea. Nevertheless, Raghava, with his friend Gopal, secretly begins to search for a place suitable for his hotel. His uncle Nageswara Rao offers him a shed for lease, but Raghava politely rejects the offer, owing to his complicated relationship with Nageshwara Rao's daughter Sandhya The shed is located away from the city center and falls behind a giant tree, but given the limited sources he has, Raghava later accepts the offer. Kondal Rao reluctantly agrees to fund with the money from his chit fund.

Meanwhile, the chit fund runner defaults on his payment, and Raghava's plans go down the drain. After a hustle-and-bustle, Kondal Rao decides to sell his land off to pay for the shed. Nageshwara Rao, who gets to know that the land's value would soon increase multi-fold, sees an opportunity to exchange the land for his shed at a low price. Unaware of the asset's real value, Kondal Rao proceeds with Nageshwara Rao's offer.Upon knowing that they were tricked, Kondal Rao becomes furious with Raghava

Meanwhile, Gopal, an astrology believer who runs a mobile shop in his hometown, he loves a girl called Gouthami who works in a mobile shop in Guntur. Soon, Gouthami responds positively with his advances, but after checking her horoscope, it didn't match with his. Then Gopal leaves the proceedings abruptly, which makes Gouthami disappointed.

Raghava opens his hotel in the shed but starts off with heavy losses. Raghav and Sandhya begin to spend time with each other by clearing their misunderstanding and kickstart their relationship again. Sandhya gets a match from an Assistant Engineer (AE) who works in Nageshwara Rao's office, thanks to now-increased land value Kondal Rao, who learns about his son's relation with Sandhya, asks Nageshwara Rao to marry them, but Nageshwara Rao favours the AE instead. Soon after, the land's value decreased again, and the AE's family calls off the match. Nageshwara Rao, with no option left, agrees on Raghava and Sandhya's marriage, but Raghava challenges that he won't marry until the hotel becomes profitable.

Meanwhile, the chit fund organizer, who is also the president of his hometown, commits suicide which is saddened by all the people. This incident makes Gopal realize his mistake and comes to apologize. Gouthami proposes her marriage, though she shows her anguish at her first, and she accepts his proposal and invites him to talk with her parents.

Meanwhile, Raghava realized that he had overestimated himself. Then Raghava begins to address the hotel's issues. He cleans up the dump yard behind his hotel, who had been made by them earlier and tactically clears the issue permanently. Then, he creates his own Bombay chutney's recipe with a new formula. Slowly, his business starts to pick up. Meanwhile, the AE, who is now adamant about marrying Sandhya, tells Nageshwara Rao that he is ready for the match. On their way to Nageshwara Rao's house, the AE's family boards the auto whose driver intends to marry Gouthami. He accidentally runs into Gopal and hits him. Gopal calls Raghava to take on the auto driver. During the confrontation with the auto driver, Raghava slaps the AE as he tries to stop the fight. Sandhya arrives and controls Raghava, thinking that Raghava confronts AE and the AE realizes that he can no longer marry her.

Raghava and Sandhya arrive at the Nageshwara Rao's house, and they convince him, and later they get married. Later, Raghava comes for the marriage proceedings of Gopal and Gouthami to talk with her father, a drunkard, then comically, they make him accept for the marriage.

Nageshwara Rao transfers the land to Sandhya, and its value is increased yet again. Finally, the film ends with a hotel with a similar name opened to compete against Raghava's now popular hotel, and he is seen confronting it.

== Cast ==
- Anand Deverakonda as Raghava
- Varsha Bollamma as Sandhya
- Chaitanya Garikipati as Gopal
- Divya Sripada as Gauthami
- Goparaju Ramana as Kondalrao
- Surabhi Prabhavati as Lakshmi
- Prem Sagar as Nageswara Rao
- Prabhavati Varma as Kamala
- Deshi as Seenu
- Katta Anthony as Anjaih
- Mahipal as Auto Driver
- Chanakya Tejas as Surendra
- Tharun Bhascker as AE (cameo appearance)
- Vinod Anantoju as a man in Guntur (cameo appearance)

== Production ==
In August 2019, Anand Deverakonda announced his second film post the release of Dorasaani. It was reported to be helmed by newcomer Vinod Anantoju and produced by Bhavya Creations, and Varsha Bollamma was announced as the female lead. The film's shooting reportedly kickstarted in September 2019. Anand was reported to play a middle-class guy, who is at a crossroads in life, and as the character in film organises a breakfast center, he also learnt cooking for the film. The film was predominantly shot in Guntur and Kolakaluru, and as per the setting all of the characters speak in the Guntur dialect for the film. The shooting and post-production works of the film were completed before the COVID-19 lockdown was announced in March 2020. The film's title Middle Class Melodies was announced in July 2020.

== Music ==
Middle Class Melodies

Soundtrack album by Sweekar Agasthi
- Released: 13 November 2020
- Recorded: 2020
- Genre: Feature film soundtrack
- Length: 21:49
- Language: Telugu
- Label: Aditya Music
- Producer: Sweekar Agasthi

Sweekar Agasthi chronology
C/O Kancharapalem (2018)	Middle Class Melodies (2020)	C/O Kaadhal (2020)

The film's soundtrack album is composed by Sweekar Agasthi whereas the film score is composed by RH Vikram. The album features six tracks with lyrics by Kittu Vissapragada, Sanapati Bharadwaj Patrudu, Palnadu Janapadam and Sai Kiran. The album was released by Aditya Music on 13 November 2020.

No.	Title	Lyrics	Singer(s)	Length
1.	"The Guntur"	Kittu Vissapragada	Anurag Kulkarni	2:59
2.	"Sandhya"	Sanapati Bharadwaj Patrudu	Sweekar Agasthi	3:51
3.	"Keelu Gurram"	Sanapati Bharadwaj Patrudu	Anurag Kulkarni, Sweekar Agasthi, Ramya Behara	4:56
4.	"Sambasiva"	Palnadu Janapadam	Ram Miriyala	2:46
5.	"Manchido Cheddadho"	Sanapati Bharadwaj Patrudu	Vijay Yesudas	4:43
6.	"Vechani Mattilo"	Sai Kiran	Sweekar Agasthi	2:35
Total length:				21:49

== Release ==
The film was initially scheduled to release in early 2020, but was postponed due to the COVID-19 pandemic in India. It was released on Amazon Prime Video on 20 November 2020.

== Reception ==
Hemanth Kumar of the Firstpost rated the film 3.5 out of 5 and wrote, "Middle Class Melodies is a heartwarming drama, and it treats its world and characters with a great amount of verve and emotional heft, while never losing its touch with humour." He added that the film makes "plenty of space" for its supporting characters, with a particular praise to Goparaju Ramana who played Kondal Rao. The News Minute's Jahnavi Reddy also echoed the same, "The strong performances of the supporting cast overshadow Varsha and Anand," she wrote, awarding the film 3.5 out of 5 stars. Baradwaj Rangan of Film Companion South wrote "As much as everyone keeps touting the “big-screen experience”, the biggest boon of OTT platforms may be that they are helping these smaller films find an audience beyond the home state".

The Hindu critic Sangeetha Devi Dundoo, opined that "Middle Class Melodies is a heartwarming addition to new-age Telugu cinema." Haricharan Pudupeddi writing for Hindustan Times, stated that "The small town milieu is captured beautifully and as authentically as possible. It’s so close to reality that you feel like you’re sitting with the characters and having a close-to-heart conversation." Manoj Kumar of The Indian Express, who gave the film 2 out of 5, felt that "Vinod Anantoju could have benefited from fine-tuning moments that define the very nature of the middle class."
