= Kaanchaana =

2011 Indian Kannada-language film

- Directed by: Sri Ganesh
- Produced by: B N Srinath Reddy
- Starring: Diganth; Ragini Dwivedi; Kiran Srinivas
- Cinematography: Sundarnath Suvarna
- Edited by: Sri (Crazy Mindz)
- Music by: Rishikesh Hari
- Release date: 28 October 2011
- Country: India
- Language: Kannada

Kaanchaana is a 2011 Indian Kannada-language film directed by Sri Ganesh, starring Diganth, Ragini Dwivedi and Kiran Srinivas in lead roles.

== Cast ==
- Diganth as Venky
- Ragini Dwivedi as Ragini alias Baby
- Kiran Srinivas
- Mukhyamantri Chandru
- Sathish Ninasam as Bhikshuk Nayar
- Tabla Nani as Manju
- Tennis Krishna
- Shankar Rao
- Mithra
- Gurudev Goud
- Fizal
- Pavan Bharadhwaj

== Music ==
Kaanchaana

Soundtrack album by Rishikesh Hari
- Released: 2011
- Recorded: 2011
- Genre: Feature film soundtrack
- Length: 22:58
- Language: Kannada

Official audio
- Kaanchaana - Full Album on YouTube

Track listing
No.	Title	Singer(s)	Length
1.	"Kaanchana"	Rishikesh Hari	3:59
2.	"Halliya Hudugi"	Shruthijeeth Rao	3:59
3.	"Dhuddu Duddu"	Chinthan Vikas	2:52
4.	"Bangalorina Gadibidi"	Rishikesh Hari	4:26
5.	"Sanjeya"	Anuradha Bhat, Sonu Nigam	4:26
6.	"Ayyo Raama"	Sandeep Bathra, Vijaya Shankar	4:36
Total length:			22:58

== Reception ==
=== Critical response ===
Shruti Indira Lakshminarayana from Rediff.com scored the film at 1 out of 5 stars and says "This is one film that Diganth would like to forget as it adds nothing to the actor in him. His varried getups do nothing to impress nor do they add to the plot . Kiran Sreenivas's character leaves him with little scope to exhibit his acting skills. Leading lady Ragini has very little to do as well". BSS from Deccan Herald wrote "Two good-looking people are thrown together but there is zero chemistry. It is left to Nani and Satish to lift the film, which they do within the limits set by their roles. ‘Kaanchaana’ stays true to its capricious nature - a club number picturised on Rangayana Raghu giving ample proof. Some homework and a calmer mind at the helm would have helped the film some". A critic from The New Indian Express wrote "If Diganth continues to accept this type of films in the future, the day is not too far for the audience to become oblivious about him. Unfortunately, Ragini, who had successfully set the screen on fire with her bold and beautiful performance in a hot and spicy song — Thuppa Bekaa Thuppaa — has no scope for performance in this flick". A critic from Bangalore Mirror wrote "Composer Rishikesh Hari has come up with a couple of tunes that pass the muster. Crazy Mind Shri seems to have given up on the film at the editing table. The best way to save your Kanchana is to avoid this film. Should we say more". A critic from News18 India wrote "Diganth and Raagini are a good, but script lets them down. Though there is a huge number of comedians in the film, very few scenes are funny. The film is so bad that even a top cinematographer like Sundaranatha Suvarna has not been able to provide a neat work. Avoid it at all cost". Sharanya C R from DNA wrote "Diganth and Ragini share a crackling chemistry in the movie, but unfortunately there is no room for it except for a few songs. This applies to even actors like Kiran Srinivas who has very little screen space in the movie. Though the dialogues of the movie were entertaining, there is no substantial story to support it. If you can laugh your heart out without questioning logic, then this one is for you! ".
