= Karthik Rathnam =

Indian actor

- Born: 1996 or 1997 (age 28–29); Secunderabad, Andhra Pradesh, India
- Occupation: Actor
- Years active: 2018—present

Karthik Rathnam is an Indian actor who works in Telugu theatre and Telugu cinema. Rathnam made his debut with the critically acclaimed film C/o Kancharapalem (2018), which was the first Telugu film to be screened at New York Film Festival. Followed by his appearance in ZEE5's Gods of Dharmapuri (G.O.D), Rathnam reprised his role in Tamil remake of C/o Kancharapalem.

== Early life ==
Rathnam was born and brought up in Secunderabad, Telangana. While pursuing CA, he joined a theatre with Borusu Leni Bomma for which he has been awarded Nandi Award. He then discontinued his education and went on to perform 30 plays in various cities.

== Career ==
After being an artist, dancer and actor at theatre, he was offered his first role C/o Kancharapalem's Joseph, which was one of the most critically acclaimed Telugu films of 2018. It was screened at the New York Film Festival. Rathnam later appeared as Ravi Reddy with actor Satyadev in ZEE5's Gods of Dharmapuri. He reprised his role as Joseph in Tamil remake of C/o Kancharapalem, titled C/o Kaadhal.

== Filmography ==
Key
†	Denotes films that have not yet been released

Year	Title	Role	Notes	Ref
2018	C/o Kancharapalem	Joseph	Debut	
2021	C/o Kaadhal	Joseph	Debut in Tamil cinema; Remake of C/o Kancharapalem	
2021	Check	Vikram		
2021	Ardha Shathabdham	Krishna		
2021	Naarappa	Munikanna		
2022	Rowdy Boys			
2023	Changure Bangaru Raja	Bangarraju		
2023	Lingoccha			
2024	Sriranga Neethulu	Karthik		
TBA	Untitled film co-starring Vani Bhojan and Amritha Aiyer †	Peter	Filming	

=== Television ===
Key
†	Denotes films that have not yet been released

Year	Title	Role	Network	References
2019	Gods of Dharmapuri (G.O.D.)	Ravi Reddy	ZEE5	
2023	Vyavastha	Adv. Vamsi Krishna	ZEE5	
