= Surya Srinivas =

Indian Film Actor

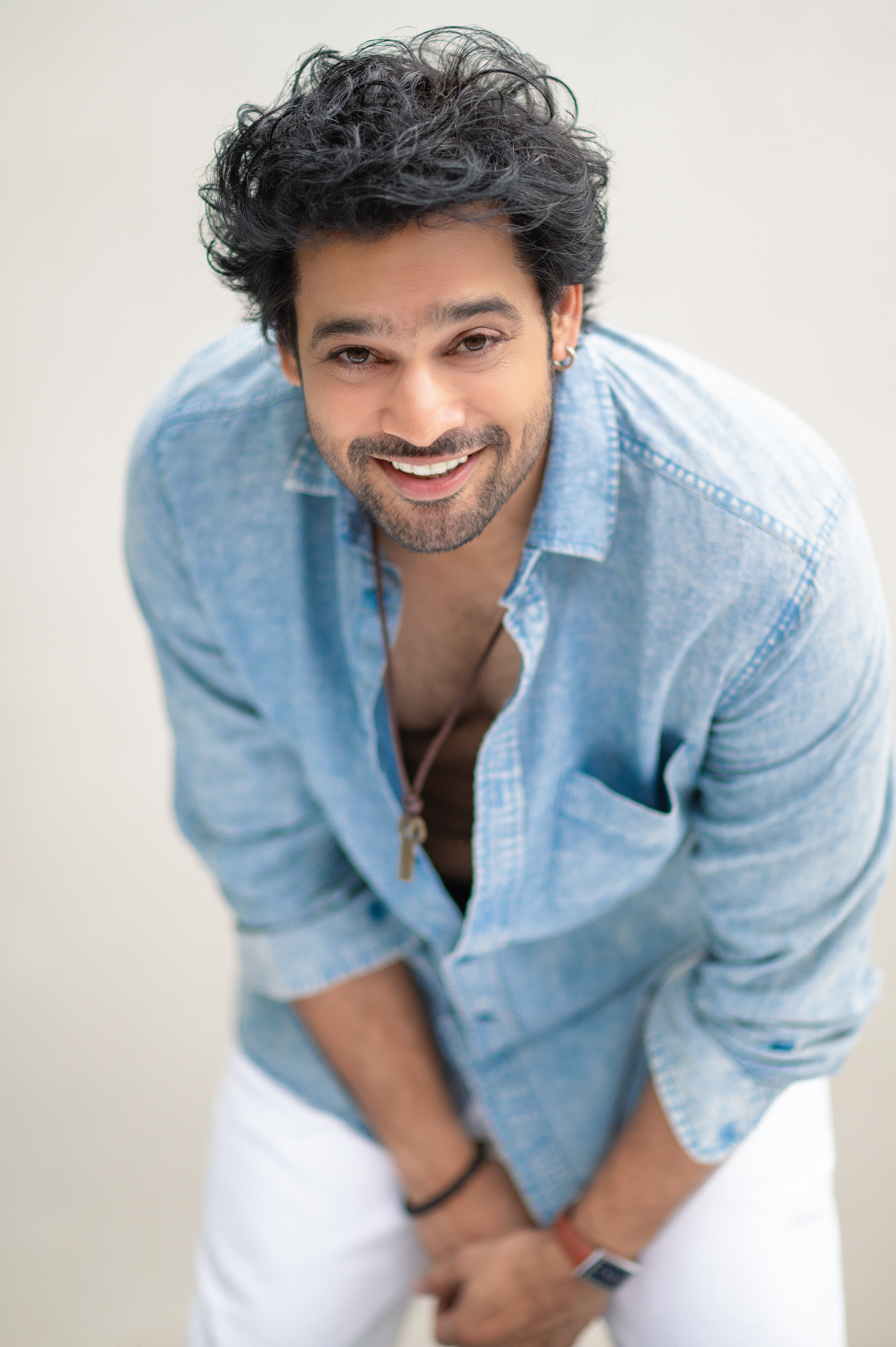
- Born: India
- Occupation: Actor
- Years active: 2016–present

Surya Srinivas is an Indian actor who works primarily in Telugu Cinema and Streaming television. He began his career working behind the camera in Television before appearing in advertisements and transitioning to acting. His film credits include Mahanati (2018),NTR: Kathanayakudu (2019), Commitment(2022), Bro (2023), Om Bheem Bush (2024), Lucky Baskhar (2024), HIT: The Third Case (2025), Zamana (2026 film) and Secret Soldier (2026). He has also appeared in Streaming series including Gods of Dharmapuri, Anaganaga,Kudi Yedamaithe,Gaalivaana,3 Roses (TV series) and Panchanama (2026 TV series)

== Career ==
=== 2016-2019 : Early career ===
Before becoming an actor, Srinivas worked behind the camera on television programmes. He has said that he initially considered careers in Navy and cricket before entering the entertainment industry. While working in television, he appeared in an advertisement with actress Suhasini Maniratnam, which led to further advertising work and his eventual transition to film acting.

Srinivas began appearing in feature films in 2016, with roles in Karam Dosa and Nenosta. He played Chetan in Nenosta, one of his early lead roles, and subsequently appeared in O Pilla Neevalla (2017).

In 2018, he portrayed actor and politician N. T. Rama Rao in the biographical drama Mahanati. He also appeared in Vijetha (2018 film) and Nannu Dochukunduvate that year. Srinivas later portrayed Nandamuri Jayakrishna, one of Rama Rao's sons, in the NTR biographical films NTR: Kathanayakudu and NTR: Mahanayakudu (2019).

Alongside his film work, Srinivas began appearing in streaming productions, including the ZEE5 series Gods of Dharmapuri, in which he played Pasha.

== 2020-2022: Film and streaming roles ==
Srinivas Played a lead role in Nevalle Nenunna (2020) , followed by the role of Ajay in the crime thriller Parigettu Parigettu (2021)

He continued working in streaming series during this period. He appeared as Anand in the ensemble romantic drama Anaganaga and played Sub-inspector Thilak in the science-fiction thriller series Kudi Yedamaithe (2021), directed by Pawan Kumar (director) and released on Aha.

In 2022, Srinivas played Dev in the ZEE5 crime-thriller series Gaalivaana, produced by BBC Studios India and Northstar Entertainment Corporation. The same year, he also appeared in Aadavallu Meeku Johaarlu (2022 film) and played Nagu in Commitment.

== 2023-present ==
In 2023, Srinivas co-starred in the fantasy comedy-drama Bro, starring Pawan Kalyan and Sai Durgha Tej. Surya later identified Bro as a film that increased his recognition among a wider audience. The same year, he also appeared in Taxi and B&W.

His film appearances in 2024 included Om Bheem Bush, Usha Parinayam, EVOL and Lucky Baskhar.

In 2025, Srinivas played as ASP Ravi in HIT: The Third Case, the third instalment of the HIT (film series), directed by Sailesh Kolanu and starring Nani (actor). Surya Said that Koanu selected him for the part after seeing an audition video he had previously recorded for another purpose. He also appeared in the second season of the Aha Streaming Series 3 Roses (TV series) Season2.

In 2026, Surya appeared in the crime drama Zamana (2026 film). He subsequently starred in the spy thriller Secret Soldier, playing Prudhvi. Srinivas adopted a Nellore accent for the role. Cinema Express highlighted Surya Srinivas’ performance, noting that he ‘brings a certain humour to his character, particularly with his Nellore accent and punch dialogues.

== Filmography ==
Year	Title	Role(s)	Notes
2016	Karam Dosa	Ravi	
2016	Nenosta	Chetan	
2017	O Pilla Neevalla	KC	Guest appearance
2018	Mahanati	N. T. Rama Rao	Played NTR using facial superimposition
2018	Vijetha	Chairman's third son	
2018	Nannu Dochukunduvate	Karthik's brother	
2019	NTR: Kathanayakudu	Nandamuri Jayakrishna	
2019	NTR: Mahanayakudu	Nandamuri Jayakrishna	
2019	Maharshi	Rishi's friend	Uncredited
2019	Prati Roju Pandage	Sai's friend	Uncredited
2020	Nevalle Nenunna	Surya	
2021	Red	Sidharth's friend	
2021	Parigettu Parigettu	Ajay	
2022	Aadavallu Meeku Johaarlu	Vijay	
2022	Commitment	Nagu	
2023	Taxi	Ujjwal	
2023	B&W	Vardhan	
2023	Bro	Arun	
2024	Om Bheem Bush	Madhana Manoharudu	
2024	Usha Parinayam	Anand	
2024	EVOL	Rishi	
2024	Brahmmavaram P.S. Paridhilo	Surya	
2024	Lucky Baskhar	Sandeep	
2025	HIT: The Third Case	ASP Ravi IPS	
2026	Zamana	Vijay	
2026	Secret Soldier	Pridhvi	
2027	Antha Ramuloru Chusukuntaru †	Srikanth	Filming
TBA	Enthavaarugaani	Prakash	

=== Television ===
Year	Title	Role	Network	Notes and Ref.
2019	Gods of Dharmapuri	Pasha	ZEE5	
2019	Anaganaga	Anand	ZEE5	
2021	Kudi Yedamaithe	SI Thilak	Aha	
2021	Entha Ghatu Prema	Vinay	YouTube	
2022	Gaalivaana	Dev	ZEE5	
2024	Chantabbai	Chanti	YouTube	
2025	3 Roses	Mano Vikaas	Aha	season 2
2026	Panchanama (2026 TV series)	Hari	ZEE5	
