= Zamana (2026 film) =

2026 Indian Telugu film by Bhaskar Jakkula

- Theatrical release poster
- Directed by: Bhaskar Jakkula
- Screenplay by: Bhaskar Jakkula
- Produced by: Tejaswi Adapa
- Starring: Surya Srinivas; Jadhav Sanjeev Kumar; Swathi Kashyup; Zaara Khan
- Cinematography: Jagan Appam
- Edited by: M.R. Varma
- Music by: Kesava Kiran
- Production company: Sri Lakshmivallabha Creations
- Release date: 30 January 2026
- Running time: 130 minutes
- Country: India
- Language: Telugu

Zamana is a 2026 Indian Telugu-language Crime Suspense film written and directed by Bhaskar Jakkula. The film stars Surya Srinivas, Jadhav Sanjeev Kumar, Swathi Kashyup, Zaara Khan and others. The film is produced by Tejaswi Adapa under Sri Lakshmi Vallabha Creations.

The film was released on 30 January 2026.

== Plot ==
A rare Nizam-era coin is stolen from the Hyderabad Museum, attracting both criminals and investigators. Vijay, a petty thief, joins Shiva and Sadha to seize the coin during a black-market deal, only to discover it is a fake. Their search for the original leads them into a dangerous network of deception, betrayals, and shifting loyalties.

== Cast ==
- Surya Srinivas as Vijay
- Jadhav Sanjeev Kumar
- Swathi Kashyup
- Zaara Khan
- Manik Reddy
- R.K Mama
- Sethuraman Kumanan

== Production ==
On 14 November 2024, The film's title promo was launched by Venky Kudumula and the Pre-release event was held on 28 January 2026 at Hyderabad, Akash Puri attended as chief guest.

== Music ==
The background score and songs were composed by Kesava Kiran.

No.	Title	Lyrics	Singer(s)	Length
1.	"Miskey Ne Soke Naaku Whiskey"	Bhujang.G	Yazin Nizar, Manisha Eerabathini, Kesava Kiran	2:55
2.	"Cheliya Telusa Telusa"	Rehaman	Sid Sriram	5:25
3.	"Zamana Theme"	Bharath Mitra	Kesava Kiran	2:11

== Release and reception ==
Zamana was released on 30 January 2026.

Suhas Sistu from The Hans India rated the film 3 out of 5 and said, "Zamana features a fast-paced narrative with layered characters and stylized execution. The film was noted for its engaging twists, a strong interval sequence, and a brisk second half. Performances and technical presentation contributed to its reception among audiences who favor crime and suspense-oriented commercial cinema."

Sunil Boddula from News18 Telugu rated the film 2.75/5 stars and said "The director presents the narrative in a linear manner from start to finish. The post-interval portion maintains momentum with a series of impactful sequences, appealing to viewers who prefer fast-paced thriller films."

NTV (India) rated the film 2.5/5 stars and stated 'Zamana is a film with good thrilling idea and admired cast performances." and Sakshi Post appreciated cast performances, music and production values in their review.
