= Anaganaga =

Indian anthology series

- Genre: Romance
- Written by: Hussain Sha Kiran
- Screenplay by: Hussain Sha Kiran; Kiran Ganti; Anurag Reddy
- Directed by: Hussain Sha Kiran
- Starring: Ram Karthik; Sameer Malla; Kiran Srinivas; Abhishek Maharshi
- Voices of: Hemachandra; Sandeep; Chandralekha
- Composer: Sweekar Agasthi
- Country of origin: India
- Original language: Telugu
- No. of seasons: 1
- No. of episodes: 9

Production
- Executive producer: Swapnesh Chintala
- Producer: Geetha Golla
- Production locations: Visakhapatnam, India
- Cinematography: A. S. Nivas
- Editor: Kiran Ganti
- Running time: 27–35 minutes
- Production company: Keva Movies

Original release
- Network: ETV WIN
- Release: 23 January 2020

Anaganaga is an Indian Telugu-language romantic anthology series directed by Hussain Sha Kiran and produced by Geetha Golla. The series has an ensemble cast of Ram Karthik, Sameer Malla, Kiran Srinivas, Abhishek Maharshi, Maya Nelluri, Deviyani Sarma, Tarun Shetty, Pooja Kiran Ramaraju, Surya Sreenivas and Monica Tavanam. The nine-episode series was premiered on ZEE5 on 23 January 2020.

== Synopsis ==
The story revolves around 8 people from different walks of life who are all embroiled in love. The situation turns interesting when all these people connect with each other. How their lives turn complex with love, guilt, pain and destiny is the remaining story.

== Cast ==
=== Main ===
- Ram Karthik as Vamsi Acharya
- Sameer Malla as Jai
- Kiran Srinivas as Himanshu Dev Kashyap (Voice dubbed by Hemachandra)
- Abhishek Maharshi as Kalyan
- Maya Nelluri as Anjali
- Deviyani Sarma as Tara Sharma (Voice dubbed by Chandralekha)
- Tarun Shetty as Sam
- Pooja Kiran Ramaraju as Eesha
- Surya Sreenivas as Anand (Voice dubbed by Sandeep)
- Monica Tavanam as Maya

=== Recurring ===
- Priya Vallabhi
- Sai Charan Reddy
- Basha as Tara's father
- Revanth

== Episodes ==
No.	Title	Directed by	Written by	Original release date
1	"Love is in the Air"	Hussain Sha Kiran	Hussain Sha Kiran	23 January 2020
2	"Conflicts of the Heart"	Hussain Sha Kiran	Hussain Sha Kiran	23 January 2020
3	"When the Heart Skips a Beat"	Hussain Sha Kiran	Hussain Sha Kiran	23 January 2020
4	"Love is Not a Game"	Hussain Sha Kiran	Hussain Sha Kiran	23 January 2020
5	"An Ocean's Secret"	Hussain Sha Kiran	Hussain Sha Kiran	23 January 2020
6	"K?no?w Strings Attached"	Hussain Sha Kiran	Hussain Sha Kiran	23 January 2020
7	"Clash of the Egos"	Hussain Sha Kiran	Hussain Sha Kiran	23 January 2020
8	"The Day it All Changed"	Hussain Sha Kiran	Hussain Sha Kiran	23 January 2020
9	"When Destiny Takes Control"	Hussain Sha Kiran	Hussain Sha Kiran	23 January 2020

== Reception ==
A critic of Binged stated that "he way the director starts and ends his love stories at the same location helps the viewer see a single situation from different perspectives. Otherwise, Anaganaga has nothing much going for it." and rated it 4/10.
