= Sweekar Agasthi =

Indian music composer and playback singer

- Born: Vamsi; 6 August 1986 (age 40); Vijayawada, Andhra Pradesh, India
- Occupations: Composer, Playback singer
- Labels: Aditya Music; Lahari Music

Sweekar Agasthi is an Indian music composer, playback singer, guitarist and audio engineer, who works predominantly in Telugu cinema. He is best known for composing score and soundtrack of C/o Kancharapalem (2018) and Middle Class Melodies (2020).

== Early life and career ==
Sweekar was born in Vijayawada, India into a Telugu-speaking family. He started his career as a vocalist in the Niraval band. In 2014, he started playback singing with the song "2010 Summerlo" from the film Doosukeltha. Before making his debut in playback singing, he has worked as an audio engineer. C/o Kancharapalem (2018) was his breakthrough film. Sangeetha Devi Dundoo of The Hindu quoted, "Sweekar Agasthi's music stayed with me long after the film was over". "Asha Pasham" song from the soundtrack of the film received wide response.

== Discography ==
=== As composer ===
==== Feature films ====
Soundtracks
Year	Film	Songs	Score	Notes
2018	C/o Kancharapalem	Yes	Yes	Debut feature film
2020	Middle Class Melodies	Yes	No	
2021	Mail	Yes	No	
2021	C/O Kaadhal	Yes	Yes	Tamil film; Remake of C/o Kancharapalem
2022	Stand Up Rahul	Yes	Yes	
2023	Butta Bomma	Yes	Yes	
2024	Gaami	Yes	No	
2025	Uppu Kappurambu	Yes	Yes	
2026	Gaayapadda Simham	Yes	Yes	

==== Other works ====
Year	Work	Director	Notes
2016	Bangaram	Pranay Meherwan	short film
2016	Nenorakam	Pranay Meherwan	short film
2020	Anaganaga	Hussain Sha Kiran	Web series

=== As playback singer ===
Year	Song	Album	Composer	Co-singer	Notes
2014	"2010 Summerlo"	Doosukeltha	Mani Sharma	—	
2014	"Tere Beautiful Anke"	Loukyam	Anoop Rubens	Raja Hasan	Also lyricist
2015	"Aisa Ambani Pilla"	Lion	Mani Sharma	Uma Neha	
2015	"Gola Cheddame"	Jadoogadu	Mahati Swara Sagar	M. M. Manasi	
2015	"Detthadi"	Andhra Pori	Josyabhatla	—	
2016	"Hulala"	Express Raja	Praveen Lakkaraju	Silvia Anisha	
2016	"Vandha Speedulo"	Ekkadiki Pothavu Chinnavada	Shekar Chandra	Dhanunjay Seepana	
2017	"Takadhimi"	Ami Thumi	Mani Sharma	Ramya Behara	
2018	"Chepave Balamani"	Chalo	Mahati Swara Sagar	—	
2018	"Asha Pasham"	C/o Kancharapalem	Himself	Anurag Kulkarni, Damini	Additional vocals
2018	"Patti Patti"	C/o Kancharapalem	Himself	—	
2020	"Jaananam Neevaram"	Dhira	Sri Murali Karthikeya	—	
2020	"Sandhya"	Middle Class Melodies	Himself	—	
2020	"Keelu Gurram"	Middle Class Melodies	Himself	Anurag Kulkarni, Ramya Behara	
2020	"Vechani Mattilo"	Middle Class Melodies	Himself	—	
2021	"Ee Maya Lo"	Ek Mini Katha	Praveen Lakkaraju	Lipsika	
2021	"Venello Aadapilla"	Maestro	Mahati Swara Sagar	—	
2025	"Jai Bolo"	Kothapallilo Okappudu	Mani Sharma	Ramya Behara	
2025	"Dheeroddharanam"	Kishkindhapuri	Chaitan Bharadwaj		
2026	"Godharey"	Vanaveera	Vivek Sagar		
2026	"Kanneere Raadha"	Mrithyunjay	Kaala Bhairava	Sahithi Chaganti, Aishwarya Daruri	
2026	"Theme Song"	Gaayapadda Simham	Himself		

=== Other credited works ===
Year	Work	Album	Role
2014	"2010 Summerlo"	Doosukeltha	Lyricist
2016	—	Gentleman	additional programmer and audio engineer
2017	"Takadhimi"	Ami Thumi	additional programmer
2017	"Takadhimi (Club Version)"	Ami Thumi	additional programmer
2020	Star Maa Music Studio	—	TV series; as vocalist (part of Niraval band)
2026	"Bride Song"	Gaayapadda Simham	Lyricist
2026	"Premaki Pulihora"	Gaayapadda Simham	Lyricist

== Awards and nominations ==
Year	Award	Category	Work	Result
2019	Filmfare Awards South	Best Music Director – Telugu	C/o Kancharapalem	Nominated

== See also ==
- List of Indian playback singers
