= C/o Kancharapalem =

2018 Indian-American film directed by Venkatesh Maha

- Theatrical release poster
- Directed by: Venkatesh Maha
- Written by: Venkatesh Maha
- Produced by: Praveena Paruchuri; Rana Daggubati (presenter)
- Starring: Subba Rao; Radha Bessy; Kesava Karri; Nithyasri Goru; Karthik Rathnam; Praneetha Patnaik; Mohan Bhagath; Praveena Paruchuri
- Cinematography: Varun Chaphekar; Aditya Javvadi
- Edited by: Ravi Teja Girijala
- Music by: Sweekar Agasthi
- Production company: Paruchuri Vijaya Praveena Arts
- Distributed by: Suresh Productions (India); Weekend Cinema (Worldwide)
- Release dates: May 2018 (New York Indian Film Festival); 7 September 2018 (India)
- Running time: 151 minutes
- Countries: India; United States
- Language: Telugu
- Budget: ₹44–70 lakh (Note: While both Deccan Chronicle and The News Minute give a figure of ₹60 lakh, The Hans India estimates the budget to be between ₹44 and 70 lakh.)
- Box office: est. ₹7 crore

C/o Kancharapalem (pronounced as Care of Kancharapalem) is a 2018 Telugu-language slice of life anthology film written and directed by debutant Venkatesh Maha. It was produced by American filmmaker Praveena Paruchuri and distributed by Rana Daggubati under the banner of Suresh Productions. The film features a cast of over 80 non-actors, most of them native to Kancharapalem, a neighbourhood of Visakhapatnam where the film is set. The plot follows four unconventional love stories in parallel, all set in the neighbourhood of Kancharapalem.

C/o Kancharapalem premiered in May 2018 at the New York Indian Film Festival. The film was released theatrically in India on 7 September 2018. The film received positive reviews from the audience and a majority of the film critics. The film won Best Critics Movie award at 2019 Zee Cine Awards Telugu. It was also screened at the Indian Film Festival of Melbourne. It was honoured with "Best Film Award" at the "Critics' Choice Festival of Indian films" in Mumbai, the "Caleidoscope Indian Film Festival" in Boston, where the lead actor Subba Rao received the "Best Actor" honour, and Film Companion's "25 Best Telugu Films of the Decade". The film was remade in Tamil as C/o Kaadhal (2021), in Kannada as Monsoon Raaga (2022) and in Malayalam as Kadha Innuvare (2024). It also won the state Gaddar Award for Third Best Feature Film.

== Plot ==
The story focuses on four couples cutting across age, religion, caste and class barrier in the small area of Kancharapalem in Visakhapatnam city. It also shows how life and time plays a significant role in the fate of the four couples who break social norms for the sake of love.

== Cast ==
- Subba Rao as Raju
- Radha Bessy as Radha
- Kesava Karri as Sundaram
- Nithyasri Goru as Sunitha
- Karthik Rathnam as Joseph
- Praneetha Patnaik as Bhargavi
- Mohan Bhagath as Gaddam
- Praveena Paruchuri as Saleema
- Kishore Kumar Polimera as Ram Murthy (Sundaram's father)
- Sravani Bessy as Leela, Sundaram's Mother
- Jeswanth Muppala as Koti
- Nikita as Indira
- Durga Devi Datla as Usha Rani Teacher
- Shailaja Goru as School Principal
- Ramesh Aditya as Sunitha's Father

== Production ==
=== Development ===
The idea of C/o Kancherapalem struck director Maha while he was visiting an old friend living in the neighbourhood of Kancharapalem. After interacting with the local people and closely observing their lifestyle, Maha decided to make an independent film about the locality and its people.

Maha later happened to meet Praveena Paruchuri, an Indian American cardiologist who was looking to make a film in India. Maha showed Parachuri a pitch video of his story, for which she was instantly impressed and told him, "This is made for Cannes." Parachuri offered to produce the film and paid Maha ₹3,000 as an initial amount.

=== Casting ===
Maha recruited most of his cast, nearly 80 non-actors, who are from the town itself. While no one in the town took seriously that he was making a film, they had shown great enthusiasm to act nonetheless. Maha also cast Paruchuri for a role when she flew down from U.S. to visit the sets.

=== Principal photography ===
The film was shot for 62 days over two schedules in Kancharapalem and Bheemili suburbs of Visakhapatnam.

=== Post production ===
Post production work of the film is done at Ramanaidu Studios where its owner D. Suresh Babu happened to watch the film. Babu acquired the distribution rights of the film immediately.

== Soundtrack ==
The soundtrack and background score was scored by Sweekar Agasthi, and the audio was released on 8 September 2018 on Aditya Music.

C/o Kancherapalem

Soundtrack album by Sweekar Agasthi
- Released: 6 September 2018
- Recorded: 2018
- Genre: Feature film soundtrack
- Length: 15:53
- Language: Telugu
- Label: Aditya Music
- Producer: Sweekar Agasthi

Sweekar Agasthi chronology
Bangaram (2016)	C/o Kancherapalem (2018)	Middle Class Melodies (2021)
External audio
- Audio Jukebox on YouTube

All music is composed by Sweekar Agasthi.

Tracklist
No.	Title	Lyrics	Artist(s)	Length
1.	"Patti Patti" (Additional Vocals: Master Srikar)	Raghukul	Sweekar Agasthi	4:48
2.	"Sotta Buggala O Sinnadi"	Vishwa	Anurag Kulkarni	1:05
3.	"Asha Pasham" (Additional Vocals: Sweekar, Damini)	Vishwa	Anurag Kulkarni	4:20
4.	"Yemi Janmanu"	Classical Telugu song by Yedla Ramadasu	Kishore Polimera	4:25
5.	"Kalakatta Kali"	Folk Song	Kishore Polimera	1:15
Total length:				15:53

== Release ==
The film premiered at the New York Indian Film Festival in May 2018.

== Reception ==
Sangeetha Devi Dundoo of The Hindu called it a "small film with a large heart", further appreciating it by remarking "a rare Telugu film that takes us beyond the habitual cinematic settings to familiarize us with the sights, sounds and lives of people of a locality."

Baradwaj Rangan of Film Companion South reviewed, "A deeply moving romantic drama," and added "The format may suggest we are watching Love, Actually set in a village, in the midst of “what will people say?” considerations and drunks singing a Telugu song to the tune of Gori tera gaon bada pyara. But C/o Kancharapalem is a slow burn that builds and builds, and it goes far beyond the Love, Actually template. Yes, it’s cute and charming and very funny. But it’s also... real. [...] There’s a lot of mindfulness in the writing.[...] It’s been a while since a film showed us a side of love that’s so expansive, so generous, so attuned to the fact that love means... not just romantic love."

Srivathsan Nadadhur of The Times of India rated it a "4/5" and reviewed, "C/O Kancharapalem raises a toast to sincere, uncinematic storytelling, gives power to those unheard regional voices and does its part in undoing the stereotypical portrayal of community-specific stories in Telugu cinema."

=== Box office ===
At the US Box office, the film collected $36,000 on its first day, and $185,000 in the opening weekend.

By the end of theatrical run, C/o Kancharapalem grossed of ₹7 crore worldwide.

== Remakes ==
The film was remade in Tamil and Kannada as C/O Kaadhal and Monsoon Raaga respectively. The Tamil version was directed by debutant, Hemambar Jasti. It is also remade in Malayalam as Kadha Innuvare.

== Awards and nominations ==
Date of ceremony	Award	Category	Recipient(s) and nominee(s)	Result	Ref.
5–9 September 2018	Caleidoscope Indian Film Festival Boston	Best Actor	Subba Rao Vepada	Won	
6 January 2019	Zee Cine Awards Telugu	Best Critic Movie	Paruchuri Vijaya Praveena	Won	
6 January 2019	Zee Cine Awards Telugu	Special Appreciation Award	Subba Rao Vepada	Won	
6 January 2019	Zee Cine Awards Telugu	Special Appreciation Award	Radha Bessi	Won	
22 April 2019	Critics' Choice Festival of Indian films	Best Film – Telugu	C/o Kancharapalem	Won	
21 December 2019	Filmfare Awards South	Best Film – Telugu	C/o Kancharapalem	Nominated	
21 December 2019	Filmfare Awards South	Best Director – Telugu	Venkatesh Maha	Nominated	
21 December 2019	Filmfare Awards South	Best Supporting Actor – Telugu	Mohan Bhagat	Nominated	
21 December 2019	Filmfare Awards South	Best Supporting Actress – Telugu	Praveena Paruchuri	Nominated	
21 December 2019	Filmfare Awards South	Best Music Director – Telugu	Sweekar Agasthi	Nominated	
21 December 2019	Filmfare Awards South	Best Male Playback Singer – Telugu	Anurag Kulkarni	Nominated	
