= Arthamainda Arun Kumar =

Indian Telugu-language webseries

- Genre: Drama; Comedy
- Written by: Kittu Vissapragada (season 1); Aditya KV (season 2)
- Directed by: Jonathan Edwards (season 1); Aditya KV (season 2)
- Starring: Pavan Sidhu; Harshith Malgireddy; Tejaswi Madivada; Ananya Sharma
- Music by: Ajay Arasada
- Country of origin: India
- Original language: Telugu
- No. of seasons: 2
- No. of episodes: 10

Production
- Executive producer: Rahul Rao
- Producers: B.Sai Kumar; Niyati Merchant; Nami Sharma; Archana Karulkar; Tanvi Desai
- Cinematography: Amardeep Guttula (season 1); Rehan Shaik (season 2)
- Editors: Nageswara Reddy Bonthala (season 1); Anil Kumar Pasala (season 2)
- Production companies: Aree Studio; Laughing Cow Productions

Original release
- Network: Aha
- Release: 30 June 2023 – present

Arthamainda Arun Kumar (transl. Do you understand Arun Kumar?) is an Indian Telugu-language comedy drama streaming television series produced by Arre Studio and Laughing Cow Productions for Aha. The series featured Pavan Sidhu, Harshith Malgireddy, Ananya Sharma and Tejaswi Madivada in lead roles. Pavan Sidhu replaced Harshith Malgireddy in Season 2 as Arun Kumar Mundha.

The first season was released on 30 June 2023. Second season followed in October 2024.

== Summary ==
=== Season 1 ===
Mundha, when pronounced with a hard ‘d’ sound, is an offensive slang in Telugu which is the surname of Arun Kumar. This fact didn’t stop him being the butt of jokes while growing up. Arun Kumar was born in Amalapuram, a small town in Andhra Pradesh.

Arun Kumar Mundha, an Intern of the Year, a fresh graduate from Amalapuram, as he embarks on an internship at a marketing firm in Hyderabad. Eager to make his mark, Arun faces a challenging start, confronting menial tasks and office politics. As Arun navigates his new environment, he forms alliances with supportive colleagues like Pallavi and confronts antagonism from others like Jai. Balancing personal aspirations with demanding work responsibilities, Arun's journey takes an unexpected turn when a family emergency calls him back home.

Upon his return, Arun seizes opportunities to showcase his skills, collaborating with his supervisor, Shalini, on a significant client presentation. Despite challenges and setbacks, Arun learns invaluable life lessons from his mentor, Chacha, which help him persevere through the ups and downs of his internship. Arun's personal and professional growth is put to the test when he must fight for his colleague Pallavi's position at the firm. Through determination and newfound wisdom, Arun confronts office dynamics and strives to leave a lasting impact in the corporate world, discovering that forging his own path is the true key to success.

== Cast ==
- Harshith Malgireddy as Arun Kumar Mundha (season 1)
- Pavan Sidhu as Arun Kumar Mundha (season 2)
- Ananya Sharma Ongram as Pallavi
- Tejaswi Madivada as Shalini
- Siri Raasi as Sonia
- Vasu Inturi as Kaka
- Jai Praveen as Jai (season 1)
- Shravya Mrudala as Madhu
- Abhinav Gomatam in a cameo appearance as Karthik (season 1)

== Episodes ==
=== Season 1 (2023) ===
No.	Title	Directed by	Written by	Original release date
1	"Set Kaadu...Set Cheskovali"	Jonathan Edwards	Kittu Vissapragada	30 June 2023
Arun Kumar Mundha, graduate from Amlapuram, his dream comes true as he interns at a marketing firm in Hyderabad. From being assigned the most menial tasks, to being mocked for his name, his first day is nothing like he thought it would be.
2	"When Daridram Knocks Your Door"	Jonathan Edwards	Kittu Vissapragada	30 June 2023
Arun tries to settle in the office, he slowly begins to get trapped in its politics. While he gets assigned to a team, Jai is making his life miserable. He finally gets a chance to change teams, but it all comes down to a game of Foosball.
3	"Lippu..Lippu Kalisthe"	Jonathan Edwards	Kittu Vissapragada	30 June 2023
Things get better for Arun at work. While tensions run high at work due to an important presentation, a family emergency beckons Arun back home. Shalini threatens to fire him if he leaves, but Pallavi buys him a plane ticket home.
4	"Modhatisaari...Maruvalendhi..!"	Jonathan Edwards	Kittu Vissapragada	30 June 2023
Shalini's presentation with the client runs into problems and Arun helps her out. Shalini and Arun win the account for the firm. Shalini and Arun sneak off from the office party and end up sharing a moment. Pallavi and Jai see them.
5	"Nachithe Vadoloddu.."	Jonathan Edwards	Kittu Vissapragada	30 June 2023
Arun comes to office, excited to have bagged a meeting with Karthik, the CEO, but does not meet with Karthik, Madhu gives him his offer letter. Arun's excitement quickly dies down when he realizes that Pallavi has been sacked.

=== Season 2 (2024) ===
No.	Title	Directed by	Written by	Original release date
1	"Amalapuram to Amsterdam"	Aditya KV	Aditya KV	31 October 2024
On his first day as assistant manager, Arun is determined to lead his team to success. Arun gains control of the team and his leadership qualities are tested by manipulative colleagues and unexpected challenges from Shalini.
2	"Vasudhaika Kutumbam"	Aditya KV	Aditya KV	31 October 2024
Arun is over his head, from battling with the fierce Pallavi in a high-stakes presentation. With help from the stylish intern Sonia, Arun scores a surprising win against a demanding client, but Shalini is fuming and ready to strike.
3	"Mission Arunyaan"	Aditya KV	Aditya KV	31 October 2024
Arun's attempt at being the perfect leader backfires with strict no-break rules and a team-building Rangoli contest. Meanwhile, Shalini is scheming to get him out of the company.
4	"Pressure, Prema, and Presentation"	Aditya KV	Aditya KV	31 October 2024
Arun is on the verge of quitting after a tense encounter with his father as he is forced to attend a house-warming ceremony at Pallavi's new house. He seems to find purpose. What was that?
5	"Thaado Paedoo Telipovalaa!"	Aditya KV	Aditya KV	31 October 2024
The stakes are set as the final presentation between Shalini and Arun is about to kick off. Shalini has yet to prepare for this meeting; the CEO of the client company is eating out of her hand.

== Reception ==
=== Season 1 ===
123Telugu wrote that "Arthamainda Arun Kumar is an attempt to depict the corporate world, but the show lacks the desired emotional depth. The lead cast did a good job, and there are a few relatable moments. But the show isn’t a satisfying watch altogether."
