= Praveen Kandregula =

Indian film director, screenwriter

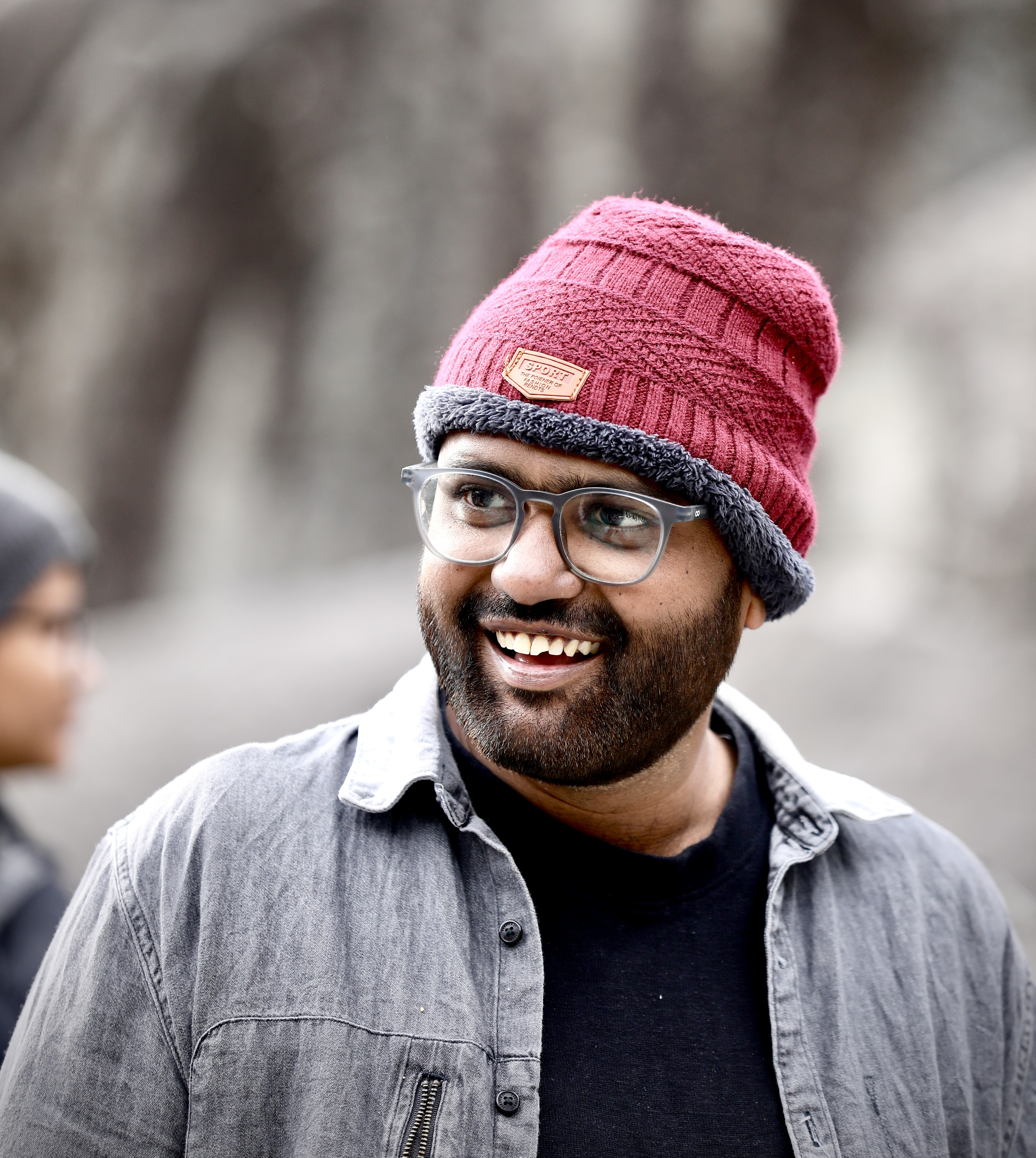
- Born: Praveen Kandregula; Visakhapatnam, Andhra Pradesh, India
- Education: GITAM; Whistling Woods International
- Occupations: Film director; screenwriter

Praveen Kandregula is an Indian film director and screenwriter who works in Telugu cinema. He made his directorial debut with the film Cinema Bandi which won him Jury Special Mention Award at 53rd International Film Festival of India.

== Early life ==
Praveen was born in Visakhapatnam and completed his BTech at the GITAM University. He later studied filmmaking at Whistling Woods International in Mumbai.

== Career ==
In 2021, Praveen made his directorial debut with the film Cinema Bandi produced by Raj & DK, which earned praise from critics. In 2025, he directed Subham produced by Samantha Ruth Prabhu and Paradha starring Anupama Parameswaran and Darshana Rajendran in the lead roles.

== Filmography ==
Key
†	Denotes films that have not yet been released

Year	Title	Notes	Ref.
2021	Cinema Bandi	Cameo appearance	
2025	Subham	Cameo appearance	
2025	Paradha		

== Awards and nominations ==
Award	Category	Work	Result	Ref.
53rd International Film Festival of India	Jury Special Mention	Cinema Bandi	Won	
10th South Indian International Movie Awards	Best Debut Director – Telugu	Cinema Bandi	Nominated	
