= Mail (film) =

2021 film directed by Uday Gurrala

- Film poster
- Directed by: Uday Gurrala
- Written by: Uday Gurrala
- Produced by: Priyanka Dutt
- Starring: Priyadarshi; Harshith Malgireddy; Mani Aegurla; Sri Gouri Priya
- Cinematography: Uday Gurrala; Shyam Dupati
- Edited by: Hari Shankar T. N.
- Music by: Sweekar Agasthi; Kamran
- Production company: Swapna Cinema
- Distributed by: Aha
- Release date: 12 January 2021
- Running time: 116 minutes
- Country: India
- Language: Telugu

Mail, also marketed as Kambalapally Kathalu Chapter 1: Mail is a 2021 Indian Telugu-language comedy film written and directed by debutant Uday Gurrala and produced by Priyanka Dutt through Swapna Cinema production company. The film stars Priyadarshi and debutants Harshith Malgireddy, Mani Aegurla and Sri Gouri Priya. The film is set in 2005 in the village of Kambalpally in Telangana. The film premiered on 12 January on Aha.

== Plot ==
Set in 2005 in the village of Kambalapally, Telangana, Ravi is an innocent degree student who is fascinated by computers. While computer and internet are new to the people in those times, Hybath opens an internet centre in the village. Ravi, who could not enroll himself in any computer course, requests Hybath to teach him how to operate a computer. Hybath reluctantly agrees on a liquor deal. Ravi borrows money from Shivanna, a local money lender to fund his expenses. Soon, Hybath creates a new e-mail account for Ravi. Meanwhile, Ravi has a crush on his classmate Roja, and vice versa. To pay back the money-lender, he borrows an anklet from her. He also gives her his e-mail ID, so that she could contact him. He checks his e-mail for her reply each day.

One day, Ravi receives a fraudulent e-mail of a lottery worth ₹2 crore. Ravi, unaware of the fraud, is all excited. He tells his friend Subbu about it. Further, Ravi receives another e-mail, asking him to send an amount of ₹1 lakh in order to process the lottery. On Subbu's persuasion, Ravi once again takes loan from Shivanna, mortgaging his father's land. He goes to the town, and sends the requested amount. Days go by but the lottery amount is nowhere to be seen. When Shivanna insists on returning the loan amount, they tell him about the lottery. He believes it and offers them more time. Later, when Hybath is informed about the lottery, he reveals that it is fake. Ravi and Subbu are shocked, now worrying about the loan.

Ravi and Subbu secretly meet a friend to seek his help on the situation. But he does not understand that the lottery is fake and keeps on asking when the amount would arrive. Subbu annoyingly replies that the amount would arrive on the last bus. Shivanna overhears the last bit and goes to the bus stop to seize the amount first. He runs away with a bag of the lone passenger on the last bus, but the villagers chase him. When he tries to flee on his moped, the bag falls off into the bushes.

The next morning, Ravi and Subbu arrive at Shivanna's place to confess about the fake lottery. However, Shivanna thinks that they were asking about his failed theft attempt. He hurriedly offers them some money in addition to waiving off the loan amount. In return, they should never speak about the incident, which they oblige.

Ravi buys a new computer with the amount. Shivanna searches for the bag in the bushes only to find it missing, as its already taken away by a shepherd.

== Cast ==
- Priyadarshi as Hybath
- Harshith Malgireddy as Ravi
- Mani Aegurla as Subbu
- Sri Gouri Priya as Roja
- Ravinder Bommakanti as Shivanna
- Sunny Palle as Suresh
- Anusha Netha as Girija
- Anji Babu as Kanakaiah
- Yennengee as Mechanic Shakeel
- Ramesh Kumar as Ranaganna

== Production ==
The film was filmed in 2020, but was delayed to release due to the COVID-19 pandemic.

== Music ==
All music is composed by Sweekar Agasthi.

Telugu (OST)
No.	Title	Lyrics	Singer(s)	Length
1.	"Tippiri Tippiri Tata"	Akkala Chandra Mouli	Veda Vagdevi	4:11
Total length:				4:11

== Reception ==
Thadhagath Pathi of The Times of India stated: "Mail is a sweet watch if nostalgic, rural dramas are your thing." On performances, Pathi wrote, "Harshit looks good on-screen and he pulls off the innocence of his character well. Mani is hilarious as the best friend and Gouri Priya is beautiful, delivering a subtle performance. Priyadarshi is unsurprisingly good, delivering a performance that's required of him."

Sangeetha Devi Dundoo in a review for The Hindu called it "A bittersweet tech story." She added that "Mail is indie-spirited and has its heart at the right place. It isn't completely engrossing; there are places I wish the story moved a little faster. The rooted milieu and the performances make up for it. Ravinder Bommakanti as the moneylender Shivanna and the other smaller rural characters are all well cast. The panchayat debate on computer virus and what follows is fun." Pratyush Parasuraman of Film Companion wrote "The tone of the 2-hour film is neither entirely serious, nor entirely satirical, showing only strains of both. "

== Accolades ==
Award (Note: Awards, festivals and organizations are in alphabetical order.)	Date of ceremony (Note: Date is linked to the article about the awards held that year, wherever possible.)	Category	Recipient(s)	Result	Ref.
Filmfare Awards South	9 October 2022	Best Director – Telugu	Uday Gurrala	Nominated	
