= Anand Deverakonda =

Indian actor (born 1989)

- Deverakonda in 2023
- Born: 15 March 1992 (age 34); Hyderabad, Andhra Pradesh, India (present-day Telangana, India)
- Education: Sreenidhi Institute of Science and Technology (B.Tech)
- Occupation: Actor
- Years active: 2019–present
- Relatives: Vijay Deverakonda (brother); Rashmika Mandanna (sister in law)

Anand Deverakonda (born 15 March 1992) is an Indian actor who appears in Telugu films. His notable films include Middle Class Melodies and Baby. He is the younger brother of actor Vijay Deverakonda.

== Early life ==
Deverakonda was born in Hyderabad, Telangana, India, to Govardhan Rao and his wife, Madhavi. Govardhan Rao was a television show director, while Madhavi was a soft-skills tutor. His brother Vijay Deverakonda is also an actor in Telugu films. Like his brother, Anand also attended the Sri Sathya Sai Higher Secondary School at Puttaparthi. Anand Deverakonda graduated with an engineering degree and worked at Deloitte. He worked in the United States for a few years and returned to India to pursue a full-time career in film.

== Career ==
Deverakonda made his film debut in 2019 with Dorasaani, a period love story directed by KVR Mahendra and starring Shivatmika Rajashekar. Although the film didn't do well commercially, Deverakonda went on to win Best Debut Male award at Zee Cine Awards Telugu 2020.

Deverakonda's second feature film, Middle Class Melodies, premiered directly on Amazon Prime Video in 2020. Later in 2021, he starred in Pushpaka Vimanam. His next film Highway, directed by K. V. Guhan, premiered on Aha on 19 August 2022. In 2023, he starred in a new age romantic drama film Baby. He was the 2024 comedy chaos film, Gam Gam Ganesha.

== Filmography ==
Key
†	Denotes films that have not yet been released

Year	Title	Role	Notes
2019	Dorasaani	Raju	
2020	Middle Class Melodies	Raghava	
2021	Pushpaka Vimanam	Chittilanka Sundar	
2022	Highway	Vishnu	
2023	Baby	Anand	
2024	Gam Gam Ganesha	Ganesh	
2026	Epic	Madham Aditya	

== Awards and nominations ==
Award	Year	Category	Work	Result	Ref.
Filmfare Awards South	2024	Best Actor – Telugu	Baby	Nominated	
Santosham Film Awards	2023	Best Actor	Baby	Won	
South Indian International Movie Awards	2024	Critics Best Actor – Telugu	Baby	Won	
South Indian International Movie Awards	2021	Best Male Debut – Telugu	Dorasaani	Nominated	
Zee Cine Awards Telugu	2020	Best Debut Actor	Dorasaani	Won	
