= Paradha =

2025 Indian film by Praveen Kandregula

- Theatrical release poster
- Directed by: Praveen Kandregula
- Written by: Praveen Kandregula; Poojitha Sreekanti; Prahaas Boppudi
- Produced by: Sreenivasulu P. V.; Vijay Donkada; Sridhar Makkuva
- Starring: Anupama Parameswaran; Darshana Rajendran; Sangeetha Krish; Rag Mayur
- Cinematography: Mridul Sujit Sen
- Edited by: Dharmendra Kakarala
- Music by: Gopi Sundar
- Production company: Ananda Media
- Release date: 22 August 2025
- Running time: 143 minutes
- Country: India
- Language: Telugu

Paradha is a 2025 Indian Telugu-language drama film directed by Praveen Kandregula who co-wrote with Poojitha Sreekanti and Prahaas Boppudi. It is produced by Ananda Media and stars Anupama Parameswaran, Darshana Rajendran (who returned to Telugu films after a decade) and Sangeetha Krish in important roles.

Gopi Sundar composed the music, Mridul Sujit Sen handled the cinematography and Dharmendra Kakarala handled the editing. The film was released on 22 August 2025 to mixed reviews. It became a box office bomb.

== Plot ==
In a remote village bound by the belief that women must remain veiled to ward off a curse, Subbu's devotion to her village's tradition is questioned after an enigmatic event. Having hardly ever stepped outside her village but determined to clear her name, Subbu sets out on a daring journey to the Himalayas, accompanied by her aunt Rathnamma and Ami, a fierce architect fighting her own battles in the modern world.

== Cast ==
- Anupama Parameswaran as Subbalakshmi "Subbu"
- Darshana Rajendran as Amishta "Ami", Civil Engineer
- Sangeetha Krish as Rathnamma "Rathna", Subbu's aunt
- Rag Mayur as Rajesh
- Harsha Vardhan as Madhav
- Rajendra Prasad as Krishna, Tourist (Special Appearance)
- Gautham Vasudev Menon as Photographer (Special Appearance)
- Palasa Janardhan
- Gnaneswari Kandregula
- Kethiri Sudhakar Reddy
- Ananya Mohan as Homestay Owner

== Music ==
The score and soundtrack album were composed by Gopi Sundar. Sony Music India procured the audio rights of the soundtrack. The first single "Maa Andhaala Siri" was released on 23 March 2025. The second single "Yatra Naryasthu" was released on 17 July 2025 and the third single "Yegareyi Nee Rekkale" released on 5 August 2025. Both the Telugu and its dubbed Malayalam versions were released on the same date.

All lyrics are written by Vanamali.

Track listing
No.	Title	Singer(s)	Length
1.	"Maa Andhaala Siri"	Sri Krishna, Ramya Behara	04:38
2.	"Yatra Naryasthu"	Anurag Kulkarni	05:21
3.	"Yegareyi Nee Rekkale"	Ritesh G. Rao	04:58
Total length:			14:57

== Release and reception ==
Paradha, and its dubbed Malayalam version, were released on 22 August 2025.

Sangeetha Devi Dundoo of The Hindu highly appreciated the writing and called it a "rare, brave film" that breaks the monotony of mainstream Telugu cinema. The Times of India rated it 3.5 out of 5 and appreciated the storytelling, and dialogues.
