= Secret Soldier =

- Releasing today poster
- Directed by: Akki Viswanath Reddy
- Written by: Akki Viswanath Reddy
- Produced by: Moola Puspalatha
- Starring: Surya Srinivas; Nihal Kodhaty; Harshitha Bandlamuri; Sreesha nulu; Kamal Kamaraju
- Cinematography: Suresh Ragutu
- Edited by: Marthand K. Venkatesh
- Music by: Karthik Rodriguez
- Production company: Moonlight Dreams
- Release date: September 18, 2026
- Running time: 118
- Country: India
- Language: Telugu

Secret Soldier is a 2026 Indian Telugu language spy thriller film originally titled China Piece has been officially renamed Secret Soldier following objections raised by the Central Board of Film Certification (CBFC) Witten and Directed by Akki Viswanath Reddy and produced under the banner of Moon light Dreams. The film Stars Surya Srinivas and Nihal Kodhaty in lead roles, supported by an ensemble cast. This film released on 18 September 2026

== Plot ==
A conflicted patriot and his reluctant friend navigate betrayal and deception to protect their country from devastating conspiracy while seeking personal redemption.

== Cast ==
- Surya Srinivas as Prudhvi
- Nihal Kodhaty as Vali
- Harshita Bandlamuri as Sarah
- Sreesha Nulu as Sheethal
- Raghu Babu
- Mahesh Achanta
- Srikanth Iyengar as Ashok mithran
- Kamal Kamaraju as Param
- Diksha Panth
- Vinod Sagar
- Vadlamani Srinivas

== Music ==
Music Composed By Karthik Rodriguez

No.	Title	Lyrics	Length
1.	"Idento James Bond"	Dinesh Kakkerla	3:15
2.	"Bhaga Bhaga"	Rehman	3:10
3.	"Oye Oye"	Rehman	2:51
4.	"Enno Ashalu"	Rehman	2:39
