= Mithra Mandali =

2025 Indian Telugu film by Vijayendar S

- Theatrical release poster
- Directed by: Vijayendar S
- Written by: Vijayendar S
- Produced by: Kalyan Manthina; Bhanu Pratapa; Vijender Reddy Teegala
- Starring: Priyadarshi Pulikonda; Niharika NM; Rag Mayur; Vishnu Oi; Prasad Behara
- Cinematography: Siddharth SJ
- Edited by: Kodati Pavan Kalyan
- Music by: RR Dhruvan
- Production companies: Sapta Aswa Media Works; Vyra Entertainments
- Distributed by: BV Works
- Release date: 16 October 2025
- Running time: 140 minutes
- Country: India
- Language: Telugu

Mithra Mandali is a 2025 Indian Telugu-language comedy film written and directed by Vijayendar S. It stars an ensemble cast including Priyadarshi Pulikonda, Niharika NM, Rag Mayur, Vishnu Oi and Prasad Behara.

The film was released on 16 October 2025.

== Plot ==
Narayana (VTV Ganesh) is an influential man in his caste (Tottekulam) and aims to become MLA in his constituency, and eliminates whoever stands in between him and his dream. He is portrayed as an evil and ruthless man among his castemen and is highly revered for his caste fanaticism. One fine day, Narayana meets S.I. Sagar (Vennela Kishore) secretly and asks him to find his kidnapped daughter (claiming she has actually eloped with someone) and bribes him. Sagar starts investigating and comes to a point where the story shifts to four rogues.

Chaitanya (Priyadarshi Pulikonda), Abhi (Rag Mayur), Sathwik (Vishnu Oi), and Rajeev (Prasad Behara) are best friends who are jobless and penniless. However, they live their lives to the fullest. One day, Abhi and Sathwik come across Swecha (Niharika NM) and fall for her at first sight. Both pursue her, while Chaitanya helps them along with Rajeev, and the latter duo enjoys the former duo's problems and squabbling with each other to win over Swecha.

Chaitanya advises both hopeless romantics to propose to Swecha. Before that, the gang learns that Swecha is actually Narayana's daughter, which makes Abhi and Sathwik consider backing off. Chaitanya motivates them, resulting in the two separately proposing to Swecha. However, Swecha confesses she loves Chaitanya because she thinks he is the one pursuing her.

Due to Swecha loving Chaitanya, he reciprocates her feelings. Sagar comes to the ridiculous conclusion that the four men are responsible for Swecha's kidnapping and decides to find them, but Chaitanya and his friends are just drunk and sleeping in the yard next to the police station. When the group wakes up, they realize Narayana's men are pursuing them, and they are accused of kidnapping Swecha, and somehow Swecha is in the car's boot.

After a ridiculous number of events that Chaitanya and Swecha tries to marry, Swecha returns to her father after Chaitanya decides to be with his friends, even though they are selfish and self-centred. Narayana fixes Swecha's marriage with their castemen. However, Chaitanya arrives, a ridiculous fight takes place, and Narayana agrees to Swecha and Chaitanya's marriage after he manipulates him. The movie ends with Swecha and Chaitanya's marriage and Narayana losing his MLA position to his follower Govardhan (Jeevan Reddy).

In between this whole mess of events, Satya (Satya Akkala) appears on the screen many times, claiming he is an important character, and annoys Sagar. However, it is revealed that he is just a guy who was placed in the film because he is related to some technical staff.

== Cast ==
- Priyadarshi Pulikonda as Chaitanya
- Niharika NM as Swecha
- Rag Mayur as Abhi
- Vishnu Oi as Sathwik
- Prasad Behara as Rajeev
- Vennela Kishore as SI Sagar Chandra
- Satya as "Important Character"
- VTV Ganesh as Narayana Tutte, Swecha's father
- Anitha Chowdary as Swecha’s mother
- Jeevan Naidu as Govardhan Tutte
- Satya Prakash as Freedom Raju, Opposing party MLA candidate
- Ramaraju as Party Leader
- Raghu Karumanchi as a goon
- Sudharshan as Tea stall Customer
- Sivannarayana Naripeddi as Chaitanya’s father
- Vasu Inturi as Abhi’s father
- Satya Krishnan as Abhi’s mother
- Manik Reddy as Sathwik’s father
- Kranthi Balivada as Sathwik’s mother
- Vamshidhar Goud as Tony
- Mahesh Chintala as Govardhan’s assistant
- Rohan Roy
- Brahmanandam - cameo appearance in the song Jambar Gimbar Laala
- K. V. Anudeep in a cameo appearance
- Dheer Charan Srivastav in a cameo appearance

== Music ==
The background score and soundtrack were composed by RR Dhruvan.

No.	Title	Lyrics	Singer(s)	Length
1.	"Kattanduko Janaki"	Kasarla Shyam	Rahul Sipligunj, RR Dhruvan	4:09
2.	"Jambar Gimbar Lala"	RR Dhruvan	Aditi Bhavaraju, RR Dhruvan	3:45
3.	"Swecha Standuu"	RR Dhruvan	Dhanunjay Seepana, RR Dhruvan, Vedavagdevi	4:05
4.	"Thella Kodi Nalla Kodi"	RR Dhruvan, Sai Prasad Poojari	Ashwini Rathod, RR Dhruvan	3:20
5.	"Theme Song"	RR Dhruvan	RR Dhruvan	2:34

== Release and reception ==
Mithra Mandali was released on 16 October 2025.

The Times of India stated that, "the premise is promising, but the execution struggles to balance absurd comedy with social commentary". In a similar tone, Aditya Devulapally of Cinema Express stated, "The film’s heart is in the right place, but its rhythm is out of tune". The Hindu reviewed it as "more noise, little fun".
