= Gods of Dharmapuri =

Indian streaming television series

- Also known as: G.O.D.
- Genre: Crime
- Written by: Bala Krishna Kolan
- Directed by: Anish Kuruvilla
- Starring: Raj Deepak Shetty; Sruthi Jayan; Satyadev; Karthik Rathnam
- Composer: Shakthikanth Karthick
- Country of origin: India
- Original language: Telugu
- No. of seasons: 1
- No. of episodes: 10 (list of episodes)

Production
- Producer: Radhika Lavu
- Cinematography: Naveen Yadav
- Editor: Abhinav Reddy Danda
- Camera setup: Multi-camera
- Running time: 40 mins approx.
- Production company: ZEE5

Original release
- Network: Zee5
- Release: 23 October 2019

Gods of Dharmapuri (shortened known as G.O.D) is a 2019 Telugu-language streaming television series, starring Raj Deepak Shetty, Sruthi Jayan, Satyadev and Karthik Rathnam. The series was directed by Anish Kuruvilla and produced by Radhika Lavu.

== Cast ==
- Raj Deepak Shetty as Pratap Reddy (10 episodes)
- Sruthy Jayan as Saroja (10 episodes)
- Satyadev as Venu Reddy (6 episodes)
- Karthik Rathnam as Ravi Reddy (5 episodes)
- Jagadeesh Prathap Bandhari as Chalapathi (10 episodes)
- Vijay Adhiraj as Vengal Reddy (6 episodes)
- Chandini Chowdary as Swapna (6 episodes)
- John Kottoly as Ranga Rao (6 episodes)
- L.B. Sriram as DN Reddy (6 episodes)
- Samyukta Hornad as Divya Matthews (5 episodes)
- Anish Kuruvilla as Mr. Rao (4 episodes)
- Surya Sreenivas as Pasha (4 episodes)
- Baladitya as Satyanand (1 episode)

== Episodes ==
No. overall	No. in season	Title	Directed by	Written by	Original release date
1	1	"When the going gets tough"	Anish Kuruvilla	Hamza Ali and Anish Kuruvilla	23 October 2019
2	2	"En route to power"	Anish Kuruvilla	Hamza Ali and Anish Kuruvilla	23 October 2019
3	3	"Pratap takes control"	Anish Kuruvilla	Hamza Ali and Anish Kuruvilla	23 October 2019
4	4	"The battle for power"	Anish Kuruvilla	Hamza Ali and Anish Kuruvilla	23 October 2019
5	5	"Pratap and Saroja gets attacked"	Anish Kuruvilla	Hamza Ali and Anish Kuruvilla	23 October 2019
6	6	"The end of an era"	Anish Kuruvilla	Hamza Ali and Anish Kuruvilla	23 October 2019
7	7	"A complicated marriage"	Anish Kuruvilla	Hamza Ali and Anish Kuruvilla	23 October 2019
8	8	"When everything is over"	Anish Kuruvilla	Hamza Ali and Anish Kuruvilla	23 October 2019
9	9	"Who is at fault?"	Anish Kuruvilla	Hamza Ali and Anish Kuruvilla	23 October 2019
10	10	"The rise and fall"	Anish Kuruvilla	Hamza Ali and Anish Kuruvilla	23 October 2019

== Reception ==
Hemanth Kumar CR writing his review for The News Minute, wrote: "The series is a roller-coaster ride, and Anish Kuruvilla has a stern control over the narrative [...] However, once the story crosses the tipping point, it turns into a rewarding experience for all the emotional investment that it demands from the viewers."

Pratyush Parusuraman of Film Companion stated: "The beats of the story are inherently dramatic, but in the hands of Anish Kuruvilla, it also becomes incredibly stylish, with vignette frames, yellow flares, and a rousing score."

123Telugu.com, rated the series 3/5 and wrote: "Gods of Dharmapuri is a well-made web series with a rustic backdrop and gritty performances. The world of Dharmapuri, performances, and narration are good assets."
