= Panchanama (2026 TV series) =

Indian Telugu web series

- Genre: Crime; Mystery; Thriller
- Written by: Nagendra Pilla
- Directed by: Mohan Srivatsa
- Starring: Bharath Srinivasan; Surya Srinivas; Shivaji Raja; Medha Reddy; Charan Babu
- Composer: Naresh Kumaran
- Country of origin: India
- Original language: Telugu
- No. of episodes: 6

Production
- Producers: Midde Vijayendra Mouli; Udaya Bhanu
- Cinematography: Sandeep Kanth N.
- Editor: Srinivas Bainaboyina
- Production company: Udaya Bhanu Productions

Original release
- Network: ZEE5
- Release: 11 September 2026

Panchanama is an Indian Telugu-language crime thriller web series directed by Mohan Srivatsa and written by Nagendra Pilla. It is a remake of the Tamil ZEE5 series Regai, released in late 2025. It stars Bharath Srinivasan alongside Shivaji Raja, Medha Reddy, Charan Babu, Rupa Lakshmi, Radhika Priti, Surya and Srija. The series premiered on ZEE5's Telugu platform on 11 September 2026.

== Premise ==
Jai Ram is a police officer whose close friend Adhi is found dead in his hostel room. Investigating the death, Jai Ram discovers that Adhi's fingerprints match those of two other people who also died on the same day, and his search for a connection between the three deaths leads him to an organ-trafficking network that preys on financially desperate young men.

== Cast ==
- Bharath Srinivasan as Jai Ram
- Shivaji Raja
- Surya Srinivas as Hari
- Medha Reddy
- Charan Babu
- Rupa Lakshmi
- Radhika Priti
- Srija

== Release ==
Panchanama premiered on ZEE5's Telugu platform on 11 September 2026, with all six episodes released together.

== Reception ==
123telugu.com rated the series 2.25 out of 5. The review found the opening mystery, built around the fingerprint discrepancy, effective at raising questions and creating curiosity, and praised Bharath Srinivasan's performance as suitably serious for the role. It found the writing unable to sustain the momentum of its own setup as the series progressed.

Siddartha Toleti, writing for M9 News, described the series as mechanical and formulaic, with thinly written characters and a rushed visual style. He praised Rupa Lakshmi's performance and Naresh Kumaran's score, but found the climax the only substantial part of an otherwise generic show.

Asianet News Telugu also reviewed the series, describing it as a police investigation thriller that builds its case from a single clue.
