= Cinema Bandi =

2021 film directed by Praveen Kandregula

- Release poster
- Directed by: Praveen Kandregula
- Written by: Vasanth Maringanti
- Screenplay by: Krishna Prathyusha; Vasanth Maringanti; Praveen Kandregula
- Produced by: Raj & DK
- Starring: Vikas Vasishta; Sandeep Varanasi; Rag Mayur
- Cinematography: Apoorva Anil Shaligram; Sagar Y. V. V.
- Edited by: Dharmendra Kakarala; Ravi Teja Girijala
- Music by: Satyavolu Sirish; Varun Reddy
- Production company: d2r Indie
- Distributed by: Netflix
- Release date: 14 May 2021
- Running time: 98 minutes
- Country: India
- Language: Telugu

Cinema Bandi (transl. Cinema Van) is a 2021 Indian Telugu-language neo-noir dramedy film directed by debutant Praveen Kandregula. Produced by Raj & DK, the film features several debutant actors. Set in a village near the Andhra–Karnataka border, the plot revolves around a group of young filmmakers trying to make a film through a camera they found. The film premiered on Netflix on 14 May 2021. Cinema Bandi is featured in the Indian Panorama section at the 53rd IFFI where it won the Jury Special Mention. The film is inspired from an Indian documentary Supermen of Malegaon (2008).

== Plot ==
Veerababu, an auto rickshaw driver, finds an expensive camera that was left in his auto. He initially tries to sell it or rent it out for money so that he could pay off the loan on his auto. However, after watching a TV program about lucrative low-budget films, he decides to make a film by himself using the camera. He picks up a love story given by an old man and teams up with his friend Ganapathi, who is a still photographer by profession. After a long hunt for the cast, they select a barber, Maridayya (who takes up the screen name Maridesh Babu), and a schoolgirl, Divya as their leads. They begin the shoot but face a struggle due to their inexperience and frequent interruptions from the fellow villagers. Soon after, Divya's marriage is forcefully arranged by her father, and she elopes with her boyfriend. Villagers blame Veerababu for it, but he is adamant about continuing the shoot. They cast Manga, Maridesh's girlfriend as a replacement and restart filming.

Meanwhile, Sindhu, the woman who lost the camera, is in pursuit to find it at any cost. She, along with her friend, enquires in the surrounding villages and photo studios about the missing camera. The shoot, on the other hand, is now going at a brisk pace with the villagers' support. While shooting from the top of a tree, the camera accidentally falls on the old man's head and breaks into pieces. The old man is hospitalized with severe injuries. Veerababu blames Ganapathi for the loss, but to continue the shoot, the villagers decide to pool the amount for the camera's repair. Ganapathi gives the camera to a photo studio for repair; however, the studio owner informs Sindhu instead. She furiously takes away the camera from Ganapathi and leaves. Veerababu and others are in dismay that their film is halted.

Sindhu is disappointed about her damaged camera, but after watching the film's footage from its memory card, she is impressed with their work. She edits the film and arranges for its screening in the village. Everyone is elated by watching it on the projector. She borrows another camera and helps Veerababu and his team complete their film.

In the end, Sindhu asks the old man if he really wrote the story, to which he replies that he cannot even read.

== Cast ==
- Vikas Vasistha as Veerababu
- Sandeep Varanasi as Ganapathi
- Rag Mayur as Maridesh Babu
- Uma YG as Manga
- Sindhu Sreenivasa Murthy as Sindhu
- Viswanath Mandalika as Rude Villager
- Pujari Ram Charan as Basha
- Trishara as Divya
- Davani as Potti
- Sirivennela Yanamandhala as Gangotri
- Munivenkatappa as Old Man
- Praveen Kandregula as Studio Owner (cameo appearance)
- Vasanth Maringanti as Auto Rickshaw passenger (cameo appearance)

== Production ==
Praveen Kandregula met Raj and DK in 2018 at an interview. He and other writers mainly Vasanth Maringanti(lead writer) made a booklet about the ideas of making the film. The producers Raj and DK asked Praveen to make short film on the same story. Soon he made a short film based on the same story. Thus, the film is produced.

The film was filmed in 2019. It was earlier scheduled for theatrical release in 2020. Due to COVID-19 lockdown in India, it was rescheduled to premiere on Netflix. In an interview, Raj Nidimoru said that "We want to support indie filmmakers, specially first timers to make their films. The idea is not to call for stories because it's not like we have a dearth of them. It's about finding a filmmaker who has a story or script and wants to make this film. If it interests us, we want to help them make it without any hassle." Shooting took place in Gollapalli, a Telugu-speaking village in Kolar district, Karnataka. Praveen chose the setting based on previous affinity with the Telugu dialects in Karnataka, influenced by Rayalaseema Telugu dialects and Kannada, and his wish to portray a "fresh" setting in Telugu cinema.

== Soundtrack ==
Cinema Bandi

Soundtrack album by Sirish Satyavolu and Varun Reddy
- Recorded: 2021
- Label: Mango Music
- Producers: Sirish Satyavolu; Varun Reddy

The audio of the film was released through Mango Music label. The first single was released on 7 May 2021. Lyrical version of the second single "Baavilona Kappa" was released on 12 May 2021.

No.	Title	Lyrics	Music	Singer(s)	Length
1.	"Cinema Teesinam"	Vedam Vamsi, Varun Reddy, Roll Rida	Varun Reddy	Roll Rida, Tharun Bhascker	2:46
2.	"Baavilona Kappa"	Sirish Satyavolu	Sirish Satyavolu	Sirish Satyavolu	2:37

== Release ==
The film was earlier scheduled for theatrical release in 2020, but was later premiered on 14 May 2021 on Netflix.

== Reception ==
The film became the most popular Indian film on Netflix. It is placed on the top spot in Netflix India Trendings in its debut week.

On the review aggregator website Rotten Tomatoes, 100% of 8 critics' reviews are positive, with an average rating of 7/10.

Srivathsan Nadadhur of LetsOTT cited the film as "an utterly delectable, charming, that rises a toast to the magic of cinema." Another reviewer writing to NTV, stated "Cinema Bandi toys with themes like hope and redemption. While the premise is heart-warming, the treatment could have been way better." Ramnath Nandini of Scroll.in wrote that "the [film] has a winning set-up, oodles of heart and snarky humour, which compensate for the unstructured and rambling narrative and simplistic approach." Baradwaj Rangan of Film Companion South wrote "The only problem with Cinema Bandi is that it doesn't have conflict. Everyone is too sweet, too nice, too pleasant...but the lack of conflict doesn't mean that the film doesn't have its other charms. This is a pleasant, little film about movie making and its low-key charm is its own reward."

Gautaman Bhaskaran of News18 agave a rating of 2.5/5 and wrote that "Cinema Bandi has a very interesting message about how video cameras have afforded splendid opportunities for especially short moviemakers, the film appears rather raw." Hindustan Times's Haricharan Pudipeddi said that the film is rooted in reality and it brims with the kind of energy we rarely witness in mainstream cinema.

== Awards ==
53rd IFFI

- Jury Special Mention
