= Deewana (2026 film) =

Telugu-language film by Sreekanth Sangishetty

- Directed by: Sreekanth Sangishetty
- Written by: Sreekanth Sangishetty
- Produced by: Vasudev Koppineni; Sridevi Karyampudi
- Starring: Harshith Malgireddy; Smeha Manimegalai; Naresh
- Cinematography: Vamsi Patchipulusu
- Edited by: Hrishikesh Pasapal
- Music by: Eswar chand
- Production company: Arha Media
- Release date: 20 June 2026
- Running time: 143 minutes
- Country: India
- Language: Telugu

Deewana is a 2026 Indian Telugu-language romantic drama film written and directed by Sreekanth Sangishetty. The film stars Harshith Malgireddy, Smeha Manimegalai, Naresh and others. Produced by Vasudev Koppineni and Sridevi Karyampudi. It was released on 20 June 2026.

== Plot ==
Munna is a young man who falls in love with a woman and gradually becomes deeply attached to her. His feelings begin to influence various aspects of his life, including his personal decisions, ambitions and relationships. As he faces different situations, Munna has to deal with the changes in his life and the consequences of his attachment to her.

== Cast ==
- Harshith Malgireddy as Munna
- Smeha Manimegalai as Amulya
- Naresh
- Jeevan Kumar
- Jhansi

== Music ==
The music was composed by Eswar chand.

Track listing
No.	Title	Lyrics	Singer(s)	Length
1.	"Idi Prema"	Chaithanya Pingali; Eswar Chand	Karthik	4:02
2.	"Uruku Bey"	Eswar Chand	Eswar Chand	3:33
3.	"Thella Pori"	Eswar Chand	Eswar Chand	4:13
4.	"Tarfeede Ra"	Eswar Chand	Yogesh Rella	3:36

== Release ==
Deewana was released in theatres on 20 June 2026.

=== Home media ===
The digital streaming rights of the film were sold to Aha and streamed on 31 July 2016.

== Reception ==
Srivathsan Nadadhur from The Hindu called it an "part-problematic romance" and praised Harshith Reddy performance. Hari Prasad S of Hindustan Times Telugu opined that Music director Eshwar Chand is second hero of the film, while also stating that, "Deewana' is an intense emotional romantic drama made with a pure heart".

Sakshi Post noted "Deewana is a sincere and emotionally-driven romantic drama" and further praised the writing and performances. Writing for The Times of India, Sanjana Pulugurtha gave 3 out of 5 stars and stated "The screenplay could have been more tightly structured to give the emotional moments greater impact."
