= Kiran Srinivas =

Indian actor

- Born: 25 March 1985 (age 41); Bangalore, India
- Occupation: Actor
- Years active: 2008-present
- Spouse: Hitha Chandrashekar (m. 2019)

Kiran Srinivas (born March 25, 1985) is an Indian television and film actor known for his work in Hindi television and Kannada films. He received critical acclaim for the role of a drug addict, "Roy D'Souza" in Channel V India's Paanch 5 Wrongs Make A Right and played "Dev" in Colors's 24. He was also seen portraying "Dr. Ishaan Srinivas" in Bindass's show Zindagi Wins. He had also acted in Gumrah on Channel V India, Pyaar Tune Kya Kiya on Zing TV and Yeh Hai Aashiqui on Bindass.

== Personal life ==
Srinivas was born and raised in Bangalore, in the state of Karnataka, India. He married Hitha Chandrashekar on 2 December 2019.

== Filmography ==
=== Television ===
- Note: all television series are in Hindi, unless otherwise noted.

Year	Title	Role	Channel/Platform	Notes	Ref(s)
2013-14	Paanch 5 Wrongs Make A Right	Roy D'Souza	Channel V India		
2013	24	Dev	Colors TV	Supporting Role	
2013	Gumrah: End of Innocence	Prateek	Channel V India	Episodic Role	
2014	Yeh Hai Aashiqui	Nikhil Chauhan	Bindass	Episodic Role	
2014	Pyaar Tune Kya Kiya	Abhimanyu	Zing	Episodic Role	
2014	Pyaar Tune Kya Kiya	Lakshya	Zing	Episodic Role	
2015	Zindagi Wins	Dr. Ishaan Srinivas	Bindass	Lead role	
2015	Stories by Rabindranath Tagore	Dalia/Nawaz	Epic TV	Lead role	
2016	Jamai Raja	Dr. Amol Mehra/Sawhney	Zee TV	Cameo	
2016	Dahleez	Jeevan	StarPlus	Supporting Role	
2016	Beyhadh	Dr. Jitendra Kumar Srivastava	Sony Entertainment Television	Cameo	
2018	Laal Ishq	Prakash	&TV	Episodic Role Episode 45	
2020	Anaganaga	Himanshu Dev Kashyap	ZEE5	Telugu; lead role	
2022	Duranga	Nikhil Pradhan	ZEE5	Hindi; supporting role	

=== Films ===
Year	Title	Role	Language	Notes
2007	SMS 6260	Kiran	Kannada; English	
2008	Haage Summane	Preetham	Kannada	
2009	Chamkaisi Chindi Udaysi	Ganesh	Kannada	
2010	Preethiyinda Ramesh		Kannada	
2010	Chiru	Dilip	Kannada	
2011	Prema Chandrama	Dr. Vijay	Kannada	
2011	Kaanchaana		Kannada	
2011	Noorondu Baagilu	Jagdisha	Kannada	
2012	Shakti	Vijay	Kannada	
2013	What's on Your Mind?	Mickey	Hindi	
2016	Rhythm		Hindi	
2016	Niruttara	Achinth	Kannada	
2017	Jagga Jasoos	Akash	Hindi	
2018	Onthara Bannagalu	Jai	Kannada	
2019	Mandala: The UFO Incident	Arjun Aralikatte / Nikhil "Nik" Prasad	Kannada	
2025	Junior	Vijaya’s rival	Telugu; Kannada	
2026	Bail		Kannada	
