= Changure Bangaru Raja =

- Directed by: Satish Varma
- Written by: Satish Varma
- Produced by: Ravi Teja
- Starring: Karthik Rathnam; Goldie Nissy; Satya; Ravi Babu
- Cinematography: Sundar NC
- Edited by: Karthik Vunnava
- Music by: Krishna Saurabh
- Release date: 15 September 2023
- Country: India
- Language: Telugu

Changure Bangaru Raja is a 2023 Indian Telugu-language drama film directed by Satish Varma and produced by Ravi Teja. It stars Karthik Rathnam in the lead role. Goldie Nissy, Satya and Ravi Babu are also part of the cast. It was released theatrically on 15 September 2023.

== Plot ==
Bangarraju (Karthik Ratnam), is a bike mechanic in Duggada, Narsipatnam, a place where everyone is in pursuit of colour stones. One day, after a disagreement with Somu Naidu (Raj Tirandasu), things turn dark when Somu Naidu is found murdered. Police arrest Bangarraju, but he manages to escape. Later, he's on a mission to find the real killer.

== Cast ==
- Karthik Rathnam as Bangarraju
- Goldie Nissy as Mangaratnam
- Satya as Tata Rao
- Ravi Babu as Gateelu
- Sunil as Veerabobbili (voiceover)
- Ajay as Sub-Inspector R. Sanyasi Rao
- Vasu Inturi as Appanna
- Raj Tirandasu as Somanaidu
- Ester Noronha as Varam
- Kushita Kallapu
- Nitya Sri

== Production ==
The film was announced on 11 August 2022 via a promotional poster, with official confirmation from the film's producer, actor Ravi Teja. Muhurat shot and formal launch was done on the same day in Hyderabad, India. Principal photography began that day, as informed by the makers.

== Reception ==
=== Critical response ===
Sangeetha Devi Dundoo of The Hindu wrote, "Changure Bangaru Raja begins well but squanders its potential to be a quirky, madcap crime comedy. The performances and some of the humour save the day". A reviewer of Eenadu wrote, "Goltinissi in the role of Constable Mangaratnam, Vityashi as Satya's love interest and Esther in the role of Ravibabu's mind-stealing boon. Ajay's role as Esse lacks strength. Among the technical categories, the camera department gets good marks". Srivathsan Nadadhur from OTT Play said, "Changure Bangaru Raja is a largely impressive, partly inconsistent crime comedy with superb humour and fine performances. Debutant Satish Varma displays a good flair for comedy, writes quirky characters and establishes the rural backdrop with earnestness. With a better final act, it would’ve been a wholly fulfilling experience". Saket Reddy Eleti from ABP Majha wrote, "Overall... there is no need to go to the theaters for some comedy scenes. You can watch it when it comes to OTT".
