= Rupa Lakshmi =

Indian actress

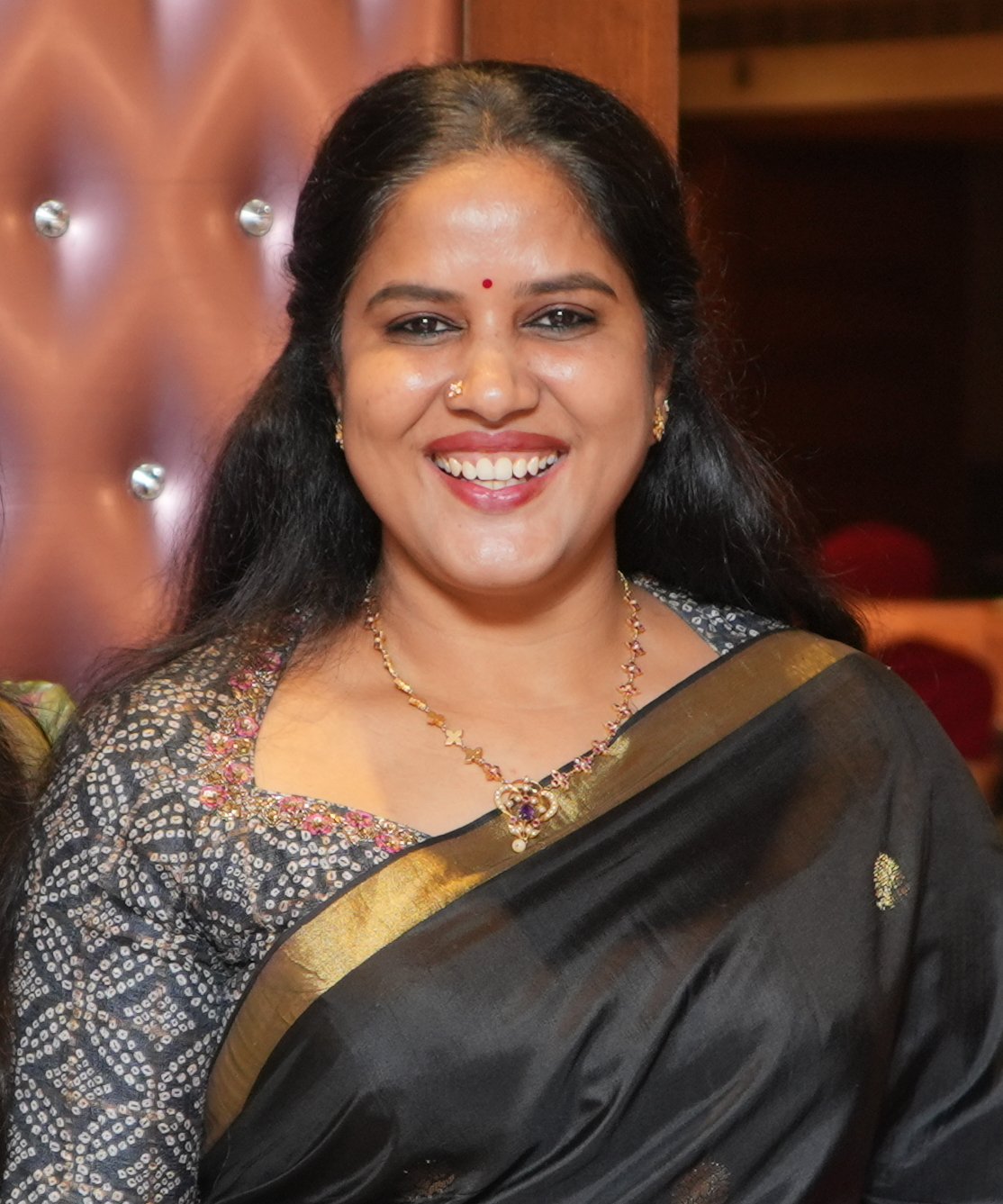
- Lakshmi in 2024
- Born: Madanapalle, Andhra Pradesh, India
- Occupation: Actress
- Years active: 2015–present

Rupa Lakshmi Vaishnava Sri is an Indian actress who appears in Telugu films. She has debuted in a supporting role in Subramanyam for Sale (2015) and has since appeared in Needi Naadi Oke Katha (2018), Ek Mini Katha (2021) and Balagam (2023), with the latter most fetching her a Filmfare Award.

== Early life and career ==
Rupa Lakshmi was born in Madanapalle, Chittoor district, Andhra Pradesh, India. After doing working in Telugu theatre, she made her feature film debut in Subramanyam for Sale (2015).

Her television debut was in Vadhuvu (2023) and her performance in Sivarapalli (2025) was appreciated.

== Filmography ==
=== Film ===
Year	Title	Role	Notes
2015	Subramanyam for Sale		
2017	Dwaraka		
2017	DJ: Duvvada Jagannadham		
2017	Jaya Janaki Nayaka		
2017	Middle Class Abbayi		
2018	Needi Naadi Oke Katha	Sagar's mother	
2018	Srinivasa Kalyanam		
2018	Ammammagarillu		
2019	Suryakantham		
2019	Maharshi		
2019	Mismatch		
2020	Zombie Reddy		
2020	Sarileru Neekevvaru		
2021	Krack		
2021	Vakeel Saab		
2021	Ooriki Utharaana		
2021	Ek Mini Katha	Subhadra	
2022	Ante Sundaraniki	Sundar’s aunt	
2022	Rowdy Boys	Akshay’s mother	
2022	10th Class Diaries		
2022	Thaggedele		
2022	Boyfriend for Hire	Arjun’s mother	
2023	Balagam	Lakshmi	Filmfare Award for Best Supporting Actress – Telugu
2023	Kalyanam Kamaneeyam		
2023	Extra Ordinary Man		
2023	Ugram	Aparna's mother	
2024	Bhoothaddam Bhaskar Narayana	Lakshmi and Sravani's mother	
2024	Gam Gam Ganesha		
2024	Kaliyugam Pattanamlo		
2024	Padmavyuham Lo Chakradhari		
2024	Brahmmavaram PS Paridhilo	Lakshmi	
2024	14	Rupa	
2024	Vidya Vasula Aham		
2024	Janaka Aithe Ganaka		
2024	Matka	Saradha	
2025	Katha Kamamishu		
2025	Dear Uma		
2025	Sarangapani Jathakam	Mythili's mother	
2025	Oka Brundavanam	Maha’s mother	
2025	Sundarakanda	Lakshmi	
2026	Papam Prathap		

=== Television ===
Year	Title	Role	Network
2020	Loser	Pallavi's mother	ZEE5
2021	Oka Chinna Family Story	Keerthi's mother	ZEE5
2023	Vadhuvu		Disney+ Hotstar
2024	Sasimadhanam	Rangammatha	ETV Win
2025	Sivarapalli	Susheela	Amazon Prime Video
2025	Mayasabha	Chitturi Rangamma	SonyLIV
2025	Rambo in Love	Vinnu	JioHotstar
2026	Panchanama		ZEE5
