= Gaayapadda Simham =

2026 Indian Telugu film by Kasyap Sreenivas

- Theatrical release poster
- Directed by: Kasyap Sreenivas
- Written by: Kasyap Sreenivas
- Produced by: Kalyana Chakravarthy Manthina; Bhanu Kiran Pratapa; Vijay Krishna Lingamaneni; Umesh Kumar Bansal
- Starring: Tharun Bhascker; Faria Abdullah; J. D. Chakravarthy
- Cinematography: Vidya Sagar Chinta
- Edited by: Viplav Nyshadam
- Music by: Sweekar Agasthi
- Production companies: Sapta Aswa Media Works; Zee Studios; POV Stories
- Distributed by: Sri Venkateswara Creations
- Release date: 1 May 2026
- Running time: 160 minutes
- Country: India
- Language: Telugu

Gaayapadda Simham is a 2026 Indian Telugu-language comedy drama film written and directed by Kasyap Sreenivas. The film stars Tharun Bhascker, Faria Abdullah and J. D. Chakravarthy.

The film was released on 1 May 2026.

== Plot ==
Darahas travels to America in pursuit of love, only to return deported and broken. Back home, he is drawn into a dangerous cat-and-mouse chase between the police and Satya Logistics. Forced to fight for survival, the wounded lion must rise and reclaim his strength.

== Cast ==
- Tharun Bhascker as Dharahas
- Faria Abdullah as Shalini
- J. D. Chakravarthy as Brutal Dharma
- Sree Vishnu as Bhairav Das (extended cameo)
- Maanasa Choudhary as Gayathri/Chinnu, Dharahas's ex-girlfriend
- Kasyap Sreenivas as Vishwas, Dharahas’s friend
- Vishnu Oi as Vaibhav, Dharahas’s friend
- Harsha Vardhan as ACP Ashok Vardhan
- Kamna Jethmalani as Dr. Pavitra Melton, Dharma’s love-interest
- Subhalekha Sudhakar as IG Vijay Kanth, Shalini’s father
- Amit Tiwari as Officer Surya Vamsi
- Anish Kuruvilla as Gayathri’s father
- Vasu Inturi as Dharahas’s father
- Sri Lakshmi as Dharahas’s grandmother
- Anitha Chowdary as Dharahas’s mother
- Krishna Bhagavan as Bhagavan
- Pradeep Rawat as Bhikshu Das, Bhairav Das’s father
- Jhansi as Bhairav Das's mother
- Supreeth Reddy as Goon
- Jeevan Kumar as Gundu
- Naveen Patamatalanka as Simba
- Sinjith Yerramilli as Sinjith
- Aruna Bhikshu as Shalini’s aunt
- Tarun Rohith as Vayunandan, Dharma’s assistant
- Siddharth Gollapudi as Dharma’s henchmen

== Music ==
The soundtrack and background score were composed by Sweekar Agasthi.

Track listing
No.	Title	Lyrics	Singer(s)	Length
1.	"Theme Song"	Asura	Sweekar Agasthi	3:08
2.	"Bride Song"	Sweekar Agasthi, Sri Mani	Manisha Eerabathini	3:11
3.	"Jingala"	Kasyap Sreenivas, Sunil Karamkanti, Srini Josyula	Nakash Aziz	3:59
4.	"Premaki Pulihora"	Sweekar Agasthi	Anurag Kulkarni	4:04
5.	"Brutal Dharma"	Sri Harsha Emani	Hemachandra	2:48

== Release and reception ==
Gaayapadda Simham was released in theaters on 1 May 2026.

Richa Barua of Asianet gave a rating of 3 out of 5 and praised the story, and dialgoues by Surya Prakash Josyula. Sangeetha Devi Dundoo of The Hindu felt that the film "that seems more promising on paper than in execution" and noted the performances of Sree Vishnu, Tharun Bhascker and Faria Abdullah. BVS Praksh of Deccan Chronicle rated it 1 out of 5 and stated that the film "neither succeeds as a comedy nor as a satire, ending up as a chaotic and forgettable outing".
