= Garividi Lakshmi =

2026 Indian Telugu film by Gowri Naidu Jammu

- Theatrical release poster
- Directed by: Gowri Naidu Jammu
- Written by: Gowri Naidu Jammu
- Produced by: T. G. Vishwa Prasad; Krithi Prasad
- Starring: Anandhi; Rag Mayur
- Cinematography: Aditya Javvadi
- Edited by: Ravi Teja Girijala
- Music by: Charan Arjun
- Production company: People Media Factory
- Release date: 17 October 2026
- Running time: 141 minutes
- Country: India
- Language: Telugu

Garividi Lakshmi is a 2026 Indian Telugu-language biographical musical drama film based on the life of Burra katha and folk artist Reddy Vijaya Lakshmi. It is written and directed by Gowri Naidu Jammu, and produced by People Media Factory. The film stars Anandhi in the titular role alongside Rag Mayur.

It was released on 17 October 2026 during the Dasara weekend and received positive reviews.

== Cast ==
- Anandhi as Vijayalakshmi "Garividi Lakshmi"
- Rag Mayur as Sathibabu
- Naresh as Rambabu
- Raasi as Devudamma
- L. B. Sriram
- Srinivas Avasarala
- Ankith Koyya as Rajesh
- Shakalaka Shankar
- Sharanya Pradeep
- Kancharapalem Kishore
- Nithin Prasanna
- Viva Raghava
- Kushalini
- Anil
- Chinni Sathya
- Bongu Satti
- Laxman

== Music ==
The music was composed by Charan Arjun.

Track listing
No.	Title	Lyrics	Singer(s)	Length
1.	"Alagalage Alagalage"	Javed Ali	Charan Arjun
2.	"Bale Bale Bangaru Ramanamma"	Sekarana	Ananya Bhat, Shakalaka Shankar, Gowri Naidu Jammu
3.	"Chandamama Chandamama"	Sekarana	Ananya Bhat, Shakalaka Shankar, Gowri Naidu Jammu
4.	"Dimitha Sundari"	Sekarana	Ananya Bhat, Shakalaka Shankar, Gowri Naidu Jammu

== Release and reception ==
Garividi Lakshmi was released in theatres on 17 October 2026.

Srivathsan Nadadhur of The Hindu called it an "compelling bioipic" and praised Anandhi's performance alongside Gowri Naidu Jammu's writing. Suresh Kavirayani of The New Indian Express rated it 3 out of 5 and opined that Anandhi is the major asset of the film, while also stating that, "..director Gouri Naidu Jammu deserves credit for presenting the story sincerely without relying on unnecessary commercial elements". Writing for The Times of India, Sanjana Pulugurtha noted that Gowri Naidu Jammu's writing and story progression. She further praised the performances of the lead cast and the soundtrack album.
