= Harshith Malgireddy =

Indian actor

- Born: Telangana, India
- Education: BTech
- Occupation: Actor
- Years active: 2021–present

Harshith Malgireddy, commonly known as Harshith Reddy is an Indian actor who appears in Telugu films. He started his acting career in YouTube short films in Chai Bisket. His first streaming television show was Mail (2021). He made his theatrical debut with the film Subham (2025) followed by Deewana (2026) in which his performance was appreciated.

== Filmography ==
Key
†	Denotes films that have not yet been released

=== Films ===
Year	Title	Role	Notes	Ref.
2024	Kalki 2898 AD	Luke	Feature film debut	
2025	Subham	Cable Srinivas	Debut in adult role	
2026	Deewana	Munna		
2026	Romeo Juliet †			
TBA	Kalki 2898 AD : Part 2 †	Luke		

=== Television ===
Year	Title	Role	Network	Ref.
2021	Mail	Ravi	Aha	
2021	Tharagathi Gadhi Daati	Krishna "Kittu"	Aha	
2023	Arthamainda Arun Kumar	Arun Kumar Mundha	Aha	
