= Brahmmavaram PS Paridhilo =

2024 Telugu film

Brahmavaram PS Paridilo
- Theatrical release poster
- Directed by: Imran Sastry
- Written by: Imran Sastry
- Starring: Sravanthi Bellamkonda; Guru; Surya Sreenivas; Harshini; Jeeva; Roopa Lakshmi
- Cinematography: Mujeer Malik
- Edited by: Avula Venkatesh
- Music by: Saketh Sairam
- Production company: Under Dreamz On Reelz Entertainment
- Release date: 23 August 2024
- Running time: 104 minutes
- Country: India
- Language: Telugu

Brahmavaram PS Paridilo is a 2024 Indian Telugu-language film written and directed by debutant Imran Sastry. It is produced under the banner of Dreamz On Reelz Entertainment. the film features Sravanthi Bellamkonda, Guru, Surya Sreenivas, Harshini, Jeeva, and Roopa Lakshmi in important roles alongside other ensemble cast.

Brahmavaram PS Paridilo was theatrically released on 23 August 2024.

== Plot ==
When a headless body was discovered near the police station in Brahmmavaram, raising questions about the identity of the victim, the identity of the killer, and the reasons for leaving the body at that location. What went wrong, and how can mistakes sometimes lead to justice?

== Cast ==
- Sravanthi Bellamkonda as Chaitra
- Guru as Goutam
- Surya Sreenivas as Surya
- Harshini as Mahalakshmi
- Jeeva as CI Vittal
- Rupa Lakshmi as Lakshmi
- Sammeta Gandhi as Brahmam
- Prem Sagar as Pattabhi
- Rudra Tippe Swamy as SI Prabhakar
- Baby Hima Sriya as Gowri
- Kakinada Prasad as SP Swaminadhan

== Music ==
The music and background score is composed by Saketh Sairam and background score by Sri Venkat.

Track list
No.	Title	Lyrics	Singer(s)	Length
1.	"Seethakaalam"	Srinivasa Mouli	Manasa Acharya	4:19
Total length:				4:19

== Reception ==
A critic from The Hans India wrote that "On a whole, Brahmavaram P.S. Paridhilo is a well-crafted suspense thriller that will undoubtedly appeal to fans of the genre. With its strong narrative, impressive performances, and effective technical execution, it’s a film that promises to entertain and engage audiences".
