= Sivarapalli =

Indian comedy drama series

- Release poster
- Genre: Comedy drama
- Created by: Deepak Kumar Mishra; Arunabh Kumar
- Based on: Panchayat
- Written by: Shanmukha Prasanth
- Directed by: Bhaskhar Maurya
- Starring: Rag Mayur; Muralidhar Goud; Rupa Lakshmi; Uday Gurrala; Sunny Palle
- Music by: Sinjith Yerramilli
- Country of origin: India
- Original language: Telugu
- No. of seasons: 1
- No. of episodes: 8

Production
- Executive producers: Vijay Koshy; Shreyansh Pandey
- Producer: Arunabh Kumar
- Cinematography: Vasu Pendem
- Editor: Sai Murali
- Camera setup: Multi-camera
- Running time: approx.24–40 minutes per episode
- Production company: The Viral Kathalu

Original release
- Network: Amazon Prime Video
- Release: 24 January 2025

Related
- Panchayat

Sivarapalli is an Indian Telugu-language comedy drama television series and an official remake of the Hindi-language series Panchayat. The series is written by Shanmukha Prashanth and directed by Bhaskhar Maurya for Amazon Prime Video. It featured Rag Mayur, Muralidhar Goud, Rupa Lakshmi, Uday Gurrala, Sunny Palle in primary roles.

Produced by Arunabh Kumar under the banner of TVF, the show revolves around Shyam, a young engineering graduate from Hyderabad who reluctantly accepts a job as the Panchayat Secretary in the remote village of Sivarapalli, Telangana. It premiered on 24 January 2025 on Amazon Prime Video and consists of eight episodes.

== Cast ==
- Rag Mayur as Shyam Prasad; Panchayat Secretary
- Muralidhar Goud as Mitta Sudhakar; Sarpanch's Husband
- Rupa Lakshmi as Mitta Susheela; Sarpanch
- Uday Gurrala as Mallikarjun; Deputy Sarpanch
- Sunny Palle as Naresh; Office Assistant
- Anji Valguman as Chandra Mohan
- Vijay Ambaiah as Tea Shop Suri
- Pavani Karanam as Mitta Anu, Sudhakar and Susheela’s daughter
- Pranay Pannala as Vinay, Shyam’s friend

== Episodes ==
No.	Title	Directed by	Written by	Original release date
1	"Sam Sir!"	Bhaskhar Maurya	Shanmukha Prashanth	24 January 2025
2	"Dayyam Chettu!"	Bhaskhar Maurya	Shanmukha Prashanth	24 January 2025
3	"Chakrala Kurchi!"	Bhaskhar Maurya	Shanmukha Prashanth	24 January 2025
4	"Adda Gadidha!"	Bhaskhar Maurya	Shanmukha Prashanth	24 January 2025
5	"Kanabadutaledhu!"	Bhaskhar Maurya	Shanmukha Prashanth	24 January 2025
6	"Idem Lolli?"	Bhaskhar Maurya	Shanmukha Prashanth	24 January 2025
7	"Chaduvukonivvandi Please!"	Bhaskhar Maurya	Shanmukha Prashanth	24 January 2025
10	"Keratam!"	Bhaskhar Maurya	Shanmukha Prashanth	24 January 2025

== Reception ==
Calling it an "polished execution", Srivathsan Nadadhur of The Hindu opined that the series had "strong cast", and appreciated cinematography and score. Sasidhar Adivi of Times Now gave a rating of 3 out of 5 and stated, "For those who have watched Panchayat Season 1, Sivarapalli might come across as slightly underwhelming in comparison. However, if one overlooks the slow pace, this village drama offers some delightful moments worth cherishing". Anisha Rao of India Today gave a rating of 2.5 out of 5 and stated "The performances in Sivarapalli are what makes the show watchable, with Rag Mayur portraying Shyam's frustration and eventual acceptance of his situation." Tanya Garg from Jagaran said "Sivarapalli tells original, humorous tales set in rural India. The series transports you to a busy Telangana village where the intricacies of rural life are unfolded."

Avad Mohammad of OTTplay gave a rating of 3.5 out of 5 and said "The Rag Mayur series is earthy, entertaining and honest."
