= Usha Parinayam (2024 film) =

2024 Indian Telugu-language film by K. Vijaya Bhaskar

- Theatrical release poster
- Directed by: K. Vijaya Bhaskar
- Written by: K. Vijaya Bhaskar
- Produced by: K. Vijaya Bhaskar
- Starring: Sree Kamal; Tanvi Akaanksha; Surya Srinivas
- Cinematography: Sathish Muthyala
- Edited by: M. R. Varma
- Music by: RR Dhruvan
- Production company: Vijaya Bhaskar Kraft
- Release date: 2 August 2024
- Running time: 144 minutes
- Country: India
- Language: Telugu

Usha Parinayam is a 2024 Indian Telugu-language romantic drama film written, produced and directed by K. Vijaya Bhaskar. The film features Sree Kamal, Tanvi Akaansha and Surya Srinivas in lead roles roles. Actor Sree Kamal is the son of director K. Vijaya Bhaskar.

The film was released on 2 August 2024.

== Cast ==
- Sree Kamal as Hanumantha Rao "Honey"
- Tanvi Akaanksha as Usha
- Surya Srinivas as Anand
- Sivaji Raja as Honey's father
- Aamani as Honey's mother
- Ali as Don Bosco
- Vennela Kishore as Detective Appadala Anvesh
- Ravi Siva Teja Paila as Prasad, Honey’s bestfriend
- Chakrapani Ananda as Usha's father
- Sudha as Usha’s grandmother
- Rajitha as Usha's mother
- Balakrishna as Anand’s father
- Madhumani as Anand's mother
- Phani as Nagaraju, Anand’s uncle
- Mirchi Kiran as Honey’s boss
- Kirrak Seetha as Julie, Honey’s colleague
- Swapnika as Sannajaaji, Honey’s colleague
- Seerat Kapoor in a special appearance in the item number "Ghallu Ghallu"

== Production ==
Filming began in November 2023 in Hyderabad.

== Music ==
The background score and soundtrack is composed by RR Dhruvan. The audio rights were acquired by T-Series.

All music is composed by RR Dhruvan.

Track list
| No. | Title | Lyrics | Singer(s) | Length |
|---|---|---|---|---|
| 1. | "Usha" | Alaraju | RR Dhruvan | 4:11 |
| 2. | "Love Is Beautiful" | Raghuram | RR Dhruvan, Aditi Bhavaraju | 3:05 |
| 3. | "Nuvvule Nuvvule" | Raghuram | RR Dhruvan, Aditi Bhavaraju | 3:05 |
| 4. | "Edhuruga Nuvvunte (Female)" | Raghuram | Aditi Bhavaraju | 2:30 |
| 5. | "Ghallu Ghallu" | Suresh Banisetti | Lipsika, RR Dhruvan | 3:30 |
| 6. | "Edhuruga Nuvvunte (Male)" | Raghuram | RR Dhruvan | 2:33 |

== Release ==
Usha Parinayam was released on 2 August 2024. Post-theatrical digital streaming rights were acquired by ETV Win and premiered on 14 November 2024.

== Reception ==
A critic from Namasthe Telangana noted “Vijaybhaskar's Usha Parinayam is a good choice for this weekend if you want to have fun and laugh for a while without any expectations.”
