= Subham =

2025 Indian Telugu-language film by Praveen Kandregula

- Theatrical release poster
- Directed by: Praveen Kandregula
- Written by: Vasanth Maringanti
- Produced by: Samantha
- Starring: Harshith Malgireddy; Gavireddy Srinivas; Charan Peri; Shriya Kontham; Shravani Lakshmi; Shalini Kondepudi; Vamshidhar Goud
- Cinematography: Mridul Sujit Sen
- Edited by: Dharmendra Kakarala
- Music by: Score: Vivek Sagar; Songs: Shor Police
- Production companies: Tralala Moving Pictures; Kanakavalli Talkies
- Release date: 9 May 2025
- Running time: 125 minutes
- Country: India
- Language: Telugu

Subham (transl. End (in positive)) is a 2025 Indian Telugu-language horror comedy film directed by Praveen Kandregula and produced by Samantha through banner Tralala Moving Pictures, along with Kanakavalli Talkies. The film features newcomers Harshith Malgireddy, Gavireddy Srinivas, Charan Peri, Shriya Kontham, Shravani Lakshmi, Shalini Kondepudi, and Vamshidhar Goud.

The film was released on 9 May 2025.

== Plot ==
The film portrays how the dead ancestor's attachment to an Indian Telugu-language serial, titled Janma Janmala Bandham, causes them to possess the wives of the entire town of Bheemili to watch the serial and how the three friends, who operate the only cable TV in town, solve it by taking the creative approach of making their own ending of the serial.

== Cast ==
- Harshith Malgireddy as Cable Srinivas
- Gavireddy Srinivas as Venkatesh
- Charan Peri as Shahjahan
- Shriya Kontham as Srivalli
- Shravani Lakshmi as Gayathri
- Shalini Kondepudi as Farida
- Vamsidhar Goud as Dish Kumar
- Samantha as Maya Matasri (cameo appearance)
- Rag Mayur as Maridesh Babu (cameo appearance)
- Vikas Vasistha as Veera Babu (cameo appearance)
- Praveen Kandregula as Venkatesh's manager (cameo appearance)

== Production ==
Production wrapped up in March 2025. The teaser was released on 31 March 2025, and the trailer was released on 27 April 2025.

== Music ==
The soundtrack is composed by Shor Police, with the background score by Vivek Sagar. The promotional song, "Janma Janmala Bandham (The Clock Strikes 9)" was released on 3 May 2025.

Track listing
| No. | Title | Lyrics | Singer(s) | Length |
|---|---|---|---|---|
| 1. | "Vellipove" | Rahman | Kunal Ganjawala, Clinton Cerejo | 3:11 |
| 2. | "Jaagratha" | Rahman | AsurA & Nawab Gang | 2:50 |
| 3. | "Ayyo Paapam" | Rahman | Clinton Cerejo, Bianca Gomes | 2:41 |
| 4. | "Janma Janmala Bandham" | Abhiram Mahankali | Bunty Gadicherla | 2:00 |
| 5. | "Janma Janmala Bandham - Remix (The Clock Strikes 9)" | Rahman, Abhiram Mahankali | Bianca Gomes, Zain Boxwala | 2:40 |
| Total length: | | | | 13:22 |

== Reception ==
BH Harsh of Cinema Express rated the film 4 out of 5 and praised the performance of the ensemble cast. He further wrote, "Subham, while making all the pertinent points it makes, is also written in a way that captures the truth of a specific phase in our recent history". Calling it a "hilarious genre bender", the review by Sangeetha Devi Dundoo of The Hindu was positive towards the film's direction and writing.

== Release ==
The film releases in theatre with U/A Certificate on 9 May 2025. The film started streaming on Disney+ Hotstar in June 2025.
