= C/O Kaadhal =

2021 film directed by Hemambar Jasthi

C/o Kaadhal
- Film poster
- Directed by: Hemambar Jasti
- Based on: C/o Kancharapalem (Telugu) by Venkatesh Maha
- Produced by: M. Raja Shekar; K. Jeevan; I.B.Karthikeyan
- Starring: Deepan N; Karthik Rathnam; Vetri; Mumtaz Sorcar
- Cinematography: Gunasekaran
- Edited by: A. Sreekar Prasad
- Music by: Sweekar Agasthi
- Production companies: Big Print Pictures; Shri Shirdi Sai Movies
- Distributed by: Sakthi Film Factory
- Release date: 12 February 2021
- Running time: 134 minutes
- Country: India
- Language: Tamil

C/o Kaadhal (transl. Care of Love) is a 2021 Indian Tamil-language slice of life anthology film directed by debutant Hemambar Jasti and produced by Raja Shekar M., K. Jeevan and I B Karthikeyan. It features Deepan N, Karthik Rathnam, Vetri and Mumtaz Sorcar. The film is a remake of the Telugu film C/o Kancharapalem (2018) and was released on 12 February 2021.

== Cast ==
- Deepan N as Palani
- Vetri as Dhaadi
- Mumtaz Sorcar as Salima
- Ayraa as Bhargavi
- Karthik Rathnam as Joseph
- Sonia Giri as Radha
- Master Nishesh as Velu
- Swetha as Sunitha
- Kishore Kumar Polimera as Velu's father
- Vinoth as Annadurai
- Udayakumar as Bhargavi's father
- Rajath Kumar as Sunitha's father
- Abitha Venkataraman as Aditi
- Balaji as Kumar
- Gauthami as Velu's mother
- Vijay Vishwanathan as Rajesh
- Tilsha Tomy Kalladayil

== Production ==
The principal photography of the film began in mid-2019 and wrapped up in early 2020.

== Soundtrack ==
All music is composed by Sweekar Agasthi.

Tracklist
| No. | Title | Lyrics | Artist(s) | Length |
|---|---|---|---|---|
| 1. | "Muttaikulla" | Karthik Netha | Anthony Daasan; Additional: Praniti | 4:46 |
| 2. | "Katril Aadum" | Karthik Netha | Anurag Kulkarni; Additional: Priya Mali | 4:10 |
| 3. | "Patta Kelu" | | Gana Mani | 1:11 |
| Total length: | | | | 10:07 |

== Release ==
The film was initially scheduled to release on 20 March 2020, which was later rescheduled to 12 February 2021 due to COVID-19 lockdown in India.

== Reception ==
Kirubhakar Purushothaman of Cinema Express rated it 3 out of 5 and stated, "While the original was a raw documentation of life in Kancharapalem, here the place is just a stereotypical town in Tamil Nadu". Haricharan Pudipeddi of Hindustan Times stated "Unlike the original, Care of Kaadhal is set in Madurai which is a bigger city than Kancharapalem. In C/O Kancharapalem, the city played a character by itself but it isn’t the case with the remake. Another aspect where the remake fails to match the original is in the casting."
