= Sriranga Neethulu =

- Theatrical Release Poster
- Directed by: Praveen Kumar VSS
- Written by: Praveen Kumar VSS
- Produced by: Venkateshwar Rao Balmuri; Dheeraj Mogilineni
- Starring: Suhas; Ruhani Sharma; Karthik Rathnam; Viraj Ashwin
- Cinematography: Tijo Tomy
- Edited by: Sasank Vupputuri
- Music by: Ajay Arasada; Harshavardhan Rameshwar
- Production company: Radhavi Entertainments.
- Release date: 11 April 2024 (India)
- Country: India
- Language: Telugu

Sriranga Neethulu is a 2024 Indian Telugu-language romantic drama film written and directed by Praveen Kumar VSS and produced by Venkateshwar Rao Balmuri and Dheeraj Mogilineni under the banner of Radhavi Entertainments. The film features Suhas, Ruhani Sharma, Karthik Rathnam, and Viraj Ashwin as lead characters.

The music of the film was composed by Ajay Arasada and Harshavardhan Rameshwar, while the cinematography and editing is handled by Tijo Tomy and Sasank Vupputuri. Sriranga Neethulu was theatrically released on 11 April 2024.

== Plot ==
The movie follows three stories that happen simultaneously.

== Cast ==
- Suhas as Shiva
- Ruhani Sharma as Aishwarya
- Karthik Rathnam as Karthik
- Viraj Ashwin
- Rag Mayur
- Srinivas Avasarala
- Devi Prasad as Karthik's father
- Sanjay Swaroop as Aishwarya's father
- Tanikella Bharani as Chaganti
- Geetha Bhascker
- C. V. L. Narasimha Rao
- Jeevan Kumar

== Release ==
Sriranga Neethulu was theatrically released on 11 April 2024. The film premiered on both Amazon Prime Video and Aha services on 29 May 2024.

== Reception ==
BH Harsh of The Indian Express rated this film 3.5 stars out of 5 stars and noted "At a time when films are increasingly focusing on good versus evil narratives, it’s refreshing to watch a film that treats its whole universe as one, and accordingly treats its people with equal dignity and depth."

Times Now rated this film 2 stars out of 5 stars and noted "Sriranga Neethulu suffers from glaring inadequacies. It lacks depth and pacing." Satya Pilagam of ABP Desam rated this film 1.75 stars out of 5 stars and noted "Viraj Ashwin, Ruhani Sharma's story is well written. As good as there is. The wedding appeared to be acting characters. Srinivas played a guest role in the story."
