= Rag Mayur =

Indian film actor

- Born: Hyderabad, Andhra Pradesh, India (now in Telangana, India)
- Education: University of Delaware
- Occupation: Actor
- Years active: 2015–present

Rag Mayur is an Indian film actor who appears in Telugu films. He is best known for his role Maridesh Babu in the film Cinema Bandi, produced by Raj & DK films, and in Keedaa Cola directed by Tharun Bhascker.

== Early life ==
Rag Mayur was born in Hyderabad. He completed his undergraduate and postgraduate studies at Osmania University and University of Delaware, respectively.

== Filmography ==
Year	Title	Role	Notes	Ref.
2017	Mental Madhilo	Aravind's colleague	Uncredited role	
2021	Cinema Bandi	Maridesh Babu		
2023	Keedaa Cola	Kaushik		
2024	Sriranga Neethulu			
2024	Veeranjaneyulu Viharayatra	Veeru		
2024	Gandhi Tatha Chettu	Satish		
2025	Subham	Maridesh Babu	Cameo appearance	
2025	Paradha	Rajesh		
2025	Mithra Mandali	Abhi		
2026	Garividi Lakshmi	Sathi Babu		

=== Television ===
Year	Title	Role	Network	Notes	Ref.
2022	Modern Love Hyderabad	Tarun	Amazon Prime Video	Episode "Finding Your Penguin"	
2025	Sivarapalli	Shyam Prasad	Amazon Prime Video		
2025	The Family Man	Maridesh Babu	Amazon Prime Video	Cameo appearance	

=== Short films ===
Year	Title	Role	Notes	Ref.
2015	Antahkaran	—N/a	As director	
2016	Rama Kanavemira			
