= Ardha Shathabdam =

2021 film directed by Rawindra Pulle

- Promotional poster
- Directed by: Rawindra Pulle
- Produced by: Chitti Kiran Ramoju; Radhakrishna Telu
- Starring: Karthik Rathnam; Naveen Chandra; Krishna Priya; Suhas
- Cinematography: Ashker; Venkat R. Shakamuri; EJ Venu
- Edited by: J. Pratap Kumar
- Music by: Nawfal Raja AIS
- Production companies: Rishitha Sree Creations; 24 Frames Celluloid
- Distributed by: Aha
- Release date: 11 June 2021
- Country: India
- Language: Telugu

Ardha Shathabdam (transl. Half-century) is a 2021 Indian Telugu-language social drama film written and directed by debutant Rawindra Pulle. Produced by Chitti Kiran Ramoju and Radhakrishna Telu, the film starred Karthik Rathnam, Naveen Chandra, Krishna Priya and Suhas in prominent roles.

It premiered on 11 June 2021 on Aha. The film is set in 2003 and based on the caste system in India.

== Plot ==
The story revolves around Krishna (Karthik Rathnam), a young man from a lower caste who works as an electrician and dreams of a better future, possibly in Dubai. He has a long-standing, one-sided love for Pushpa (Krishna Priya), the daughter of a prominent figure and former Naxalite leader, Ramanna (Sai Kumar), from a higher caste.

After years of quiet affection, Krishna decides to express his love before he leaves for a job in Dubai. A seemingly simple act or a misunderstanding related to his declaration of love inadvertently triggers a massive conflict.

The personal pursuit of love quickly escalates into full-blown communal clashes and riots across the village. The existing, deep-seated caste divisions and political rivalries, often fueled by local politicians and powerful figures (like Subhalekha Sudhakar's character), come to the forefront, leading to widespread chaos, violence, and loss of life. The film highlights how the "unwritten constitution" of caste in the village overrides formal legal frameworks.

The situation spirals out of control, dragging the families of both Krishna and Pushpa, as well as the police, into the mess. Ramanna, a man caught between his personal ideology against the caste system and his own casteist background, struggles with the fallout. The story culminates in tragedy, where Pushpa becomes a victim of an honor killing, emphasizing the brutal and irreversible consequences of defying the rigid caste boundaries in rural India. Krishna is left to deal with the devastating aftermath of his actions amid the widespread disorder.

== Cast ==
- Karthik Rathnam as Krishna
- Naveen Chandra as SI Ranjith
- Krishna Priya as Pushpa
- Suhas as Koti
- Sai Kumar as Ramanna
- Subhalekha Sudhakar
- Aamani as Ramanna's wife
- Pavitra Lokesh as Lakshmi
- Raja Ravindra as Veeranna
- Ajay as Ravinder
- Ramaraju as Village head
- Anil Geela as Krishna's friend
- Thummala Narsimha Reddy
- Gautam Raju as Roadside shop owner
- Rajsekhar Aningi
- Dayanand Reddy
- Roja Bharati

== Production ==
Principal photography of the film began in 2019. Most of the scenes were shot in Nirmal, Telangana.

== Music ==
Ardha Shathabdam

Soundtrack album by Nawfal Raja AIS
- Released: March 25, 2021
- Genre: Feature film soundtrack
- Length: 22:23
- Label: Aditya Music
- Producer: Nawfal Raja AIS

Nawfal Raja AIS chronology
Ardha Shathabdam (2021)	Rudrangi (2023)
External audio
- Audio Jukebox on YouTube

The lyrical version of "Arey Meriseyle Meriseyle", sung by Shankar Mahadevan, was released on 5 June 2021. The song "Errani Sooreede" was released on 12 March 2021.

All music is composed by Nawfal Raja AIS

Original Motion Picture Soundtrack
No.	Title	Lyrics	Singer(s)	Length
1.	"Arey Meriseyle Meriseyle"	Rahman	Shankar Mahadevan	5:15
2.	"Raye Vennalamma Raye"	Rahman	Sakthi Loganathan	3:07
3.	"Kalam Adigey Manishante Evaru"	Rahman	Anurag Kulkarni	4:46
4.	"Ye Kannulu Choodani"	Lakshmi Priyanka	Sid Sriram	4:54
5.	"Errani Sooreede"	Rahman	Mohana Bhogaraju	3:52
6.	"Nee Premaney"		Anthony Daasan	2:37
Total length:				22:23

== Release ==
The film was earlier scheduled for a theatrical release. But, it was then decided to release on Aha on 26 March 2021. Due to some production issues, it was again rescheduled, and a new release date was announced as 11 June 2021.

== Reception ==
Sravan Vanaparthy of The Times of India, rated the film 2.5/5 and opined that the film could not reach its potential due to lackluster screenplay. On performances, Vanaparthy stated: "While both the leads Karthik and Priya deliver a great performance, it does not make up for the weak storyline. Naveen Chandra’s character as a trigger-happy police officer leaves him with little scope to perform," while praising the production values. Cinema Express critic Ram Venkat Srikar who gave the film 1.5 stars out of 5 felt that though the film was well-intentioned, it misfired due to poor execution.

A reviewer from Eenadu wrote, "While the storyline chosen by the director is laudable, they faltered in showing it strongly [sic]." Anji Shetty of Sakshi who granted the film 2.5 stars out of 5 and echoed the same. Shetty appreciated the performances of the leads and music while pointing out screenplay as its weak point.

A critic of LetsOTT gave a rating of 3 out of 5 and appreciated the performances done by various actors and the direction.
