= Rambo in Love =

Indian romantic drama television series

- Promotional release poster
- Genre: Romantic comedy
- Written by: KA Creatives Team; Bheem Sreenivas; Seetha Ram; Suresh O; Venkat Ramji
- Directed by: Ajith Reddy R
- Starring: Abhinav Manikanta; Payal Chengappa
- Music by: Saran Raghavan
- Country of origin: India
- Original language: Telugu
- No. of seasons: 1
- No. of episodes: 64

Production
- Executive producers: Krishnan Kutty; Raghava Vaidyula; Rohith Pisapati
- Producer: Gutta Venkat
- Cinematography: Chandu Krrish
- Editors: Jayakumar JK; Tramp Kiran; Subbu Polishetti
- Production company: Gagan Teleshow

Original release
- Network: JioHotstar
- Release: 12 September 2025 – present

Rambo in Love is an Indian Telugu-language romantic comedy television series directed by Ajith Reddy R and produced by Gutta Venkat. It stars Abhinav Manikanta and Payal Chengappa.

It was released on JioHotstar on 12 September 2025.

== Cast ==
- Abhinav Manikanta as Rambabu "Rambo"
- Payal Chengappa as Sukanya
- Bhargav Garampalli as Tarun
- Kavya Kashetti as Mary
- Achuth Nandha JV as Sai
- Pavan Yatagani
- Ananya Jinka
- Devika Evina
- Vasu Inturi as Venky
- Rupa Lakshmi as Vinnu
- Keshav Deepak as Anand
- Appaji Ambarisha
- Sujatha
- Sidhu Diwakar
- Manik Reddy as Abothu
- Baby Varshini
- Subbaraya Sarma as Mouli

== Episodes ==
No.	Title	Directed by	Written by	Original release date
1	"The Ex Joins In"	Ajith Reddy R	Various	12 September 2025
2	"Tension at the Top"	Ajith Reddy R	Various	12 September 2025
3	"Wild Card"	Ajith Reddy R	Various	12 September 2025
4	"Bending the Knee"	Ajith Reddy R	Various	12 September 2025
5	"Flashback Sparks"	Ajith Reddy R	Various	19 September 2025
6	"Deadline Mismatch"	Ajith Reddy R	Various	19 September 2025
7	"Overtime"	Ajith Reddy R	Various	19 September 2025
8	"Code vs Code"	Ajith Reddy R	Various	19 September 2025
9	"The Harsh Truth"	Ajith Reddy R	Various	26 September 2025
10	"The Monkey Plan"	Ajith Reddy R	Various	26 September 2025
11	"Parents in the Picture"	Ajith Reddy R	Various	26 September 2025
12	"Beta Tested"	Ajith Reddy R	Various	26 September 2025
13	"Bureaucracy Troubles"	Ajith Reddy R	Various	3 October 2025
14	"Deal Done"	Ajith Reddy R	Various	3 October 2025
15	"Late Night Looks"	Ajith Reddy R	Various	3 October 2025
16	"Teamwork Is the Best"	Ajith Reddy R	Various	3 October 2025

== Soundtrack ==
All music is composed by VC Vibes.

No.	Title	Lyrics	Singer(s)	Length
1.	"The Rage Cage Song"	Radhakrishna Goparaju	L. V. Revanth	1:08

== Release ==
The first four episodes of Rambo in Love were released on JioHotstar on 12 September 2025.

== Reception ==
123Telugu rated it 1.5 out of 5 and stated, "Rambo in Love is largely a bland and forgettable watch. Payal Chengappa is the only performer who manages to entertain, while the rest of the cast comes across as over-the-top". OTTPlay gave a rating of 2 out of 5 and stated that, "Rambo in Love is a silly, over-the-top, and aimless office romance that does not have anything going its way".
