= Kancharapalem =

- Neighbourhood
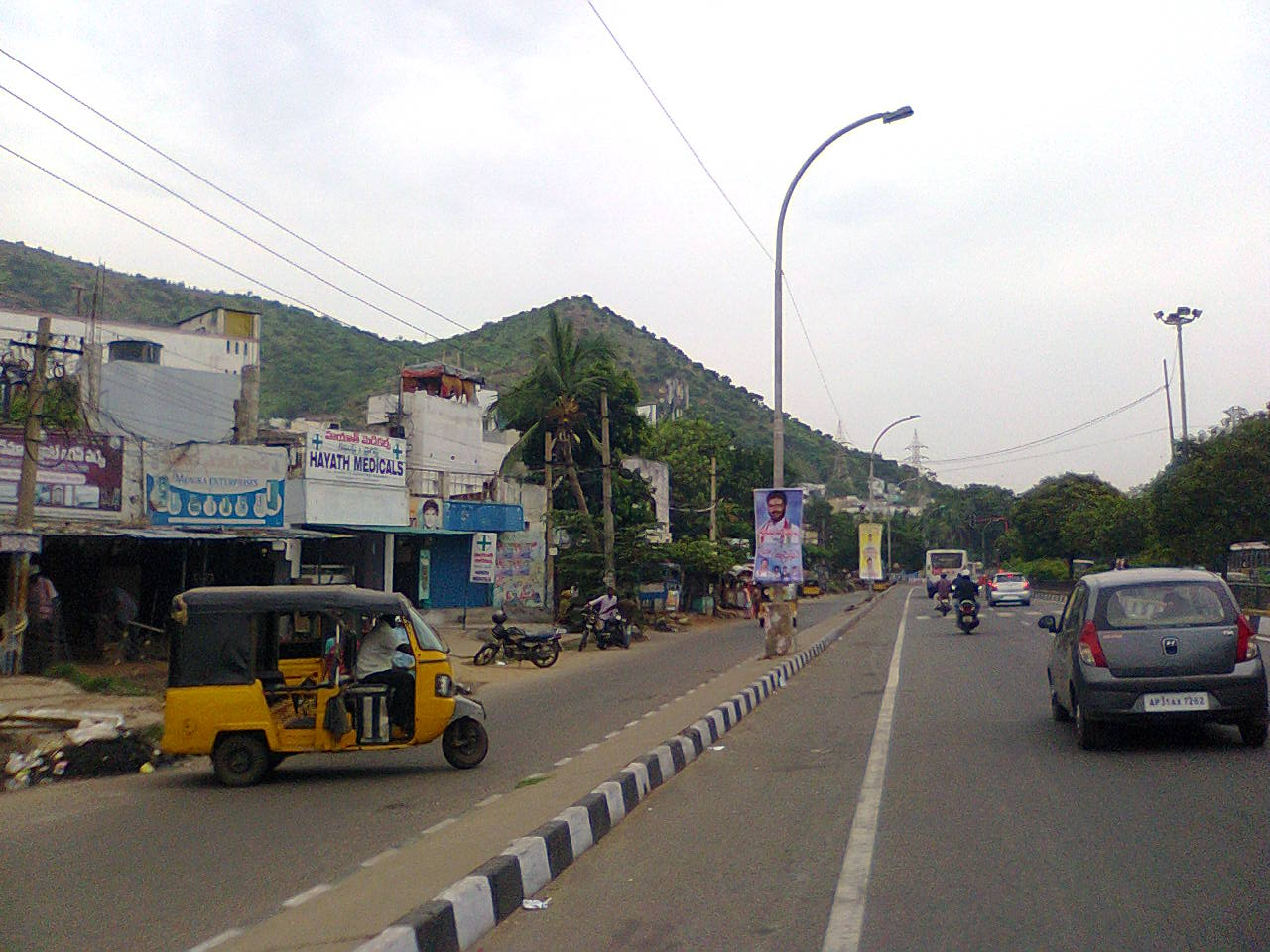
- Kancharapalem Road

- Location in Visakhapatnam
- Coordinates: 17.736212°N 83.270561°E
- Country: India
- State: Andhra Pradesh
- District: Visakhapatnam

Government
  - Body: Greater Visakhapatnam Municipal Corporation

Languages
  - Official: Telugu
- Time zone: UTC+5:30 (IST)
- PIN: 530008
- Vehicle Registration: AP31 (Former); AP39 (from 30 January 2019)

Kancharapalem is a locality in the city of Visakhapatnam, India. Kancharapalem is an old settlement of Visakhapatanam. It has the oldest railway locomotive shed, the first Industrial estate of Visakhapatnam, Govt. Industrial training Institute. Government polytechnic college (started in 1956) railway quarters, port and Navy quarters are located in this area. The oldest bridge in the town is located here known as Gnanapuram Bridge.

It is divided into many parts with community-specific localities like Gavara Kancharapalem, Golla Kancharapalem, Reddy Kancharapalem.

== Transport ==
APSRTC Buses access in every part of the city.

== Popular culture ==
The 2018 Telugu-language anthology film C/o Kancharapalem, is set and shot extensively in this locality.
