= EVOL (film) =

- Promotional release poster
- Directed by: Ram Yogi Velagapudi
- Produced by: Ram Yogi Velagapudi
- Starring: Shivakumar Ramachandravarapu; Surya Srinivas; Jenifer Emmanuel; Divya Sharma
- Edited by: Vijay
- Music by: Sunil Kashyap
- Production company: Theda Batch Cinema
- Distributed by: Aha
- Release date: 15 August 2024
- Running time: 122 minutes
- Country: India

EVOL is a 2024 Indian Telugu language thriller directed and produced Ram Yogi Velagapudi, The music of the film is composed by Sunil Kashyap.

EVOL was released on 15 August 2024 on Aha.

== Plot ==
EVOL is a narrative that revolves around two married couples. The film begins with Prabhu's revelation to his wife Nidhi about his ongoing affair, setting off a chain reaction of events. As the story unfolds, Nidhi turns to Rishi for comfort.

The movie's plot weaves through various settings from intense domestic confrontations to clandestine meetings.

== Cast ==
- Shivakumar Ramachandravarapu as Prabhu
- Surya Srinivas as Rishi
- Jenifer Emmanuel as Nidhi
- Divya Sharma as Prashanthi

== Production ==
Despite casting relatively unknown actors, Velagapudi invested significantly in the production.

Velagapudi's approach to scripting was similarly unconventional, with a screenplay that allowed room for improvisation.

== Reception ==
A critic from Hindustan Times Telugu wrote that "Overall, the movie is okay. Watch at your own risk. But, don't watch it at all with family. If alone, watch with earphones".
