= Leo (soundtrack) =

2023 soundtrack album by Anirudh Ravichander

- Soundtrack album cover

Soundtrack album by Anirudh Ravichander
- Released: 19 October 2023
- Recorded: June–September 2023
- Studios: Albuquerque Records, Chennai; AM Studios, Chennai; Studio DMI, Las Vegas
- Genre: Feature film soundtrack
- Length: 17:37
- Languages: Tamil; English
- Label: Sony Music India
- Producer: Anirudh Ravichander

Anirudh Ravichander chronology
Jawan (2023)	Leo (2023)	Indian 2 (2024)

Singles from Leo
- 1. "Naa Ready" Released: 22 June 2023; 2. "Badass" Released: 28 September 2023; 3. "Anbenum" Released: 11 October 2023

Leo is the soundtrack album composed by Anirudh Ravichander for the 2023 Tamil-language film of the same name, directed by Lokesh Kanagaraj starring Vijay, alongside Sanjay Dutt, Arjun and Trisha. The film is produced by S. S. Lalit Kumar under Seven Screen Studio.

The album featured seven songs, with four of them being previously released as singles. It was planned to be released on 30 September 2023, which would have coincided with the audio launch event in Chennai, before its cancellation. The album was released via Sony Music India on 19 October 2023, the same day as the film's release.

== Production ==
Leo's soundtrack is composed by Anirudh Ravichander, in his fourth collaboration with Vijay after Kaththi (2014), Master (2021) and Beast (2022); third with Lokesh after Master and Vikram (2022). The audio rights for the film were purchased by Sony Music India for ₹16 crore (US$1.7 million). Leo was intended to be a songless film, similar to Lokesh's Kaithi (2019) with Sam C. S. being in consideration to score the film which turned to be false. The Times of India reported that the soundtrack will have two songs. However, Lokesh, during an interview with Behindwoods in early October, stated that the film would have a total of six songs.

All the songs in the film were written by Vishnu Edavan, Lokesh's assistant director, who also previously contributed for Master and Vikram. The English tracks in the film are penned by Heisenberg. The songs were recorded during June–September, and the background score in mid-September, with the re-recording for the film completed within 10 days.

== Release ==
Before the album's release, four of the songs—"Bloody Sweet", "Naa Ready", "Badass" and "Anbenum"—released as singles. Two other songs, which later revealed to be as "I Am Scared" and "Villain Yaaru", were released as part of the extended soundtrack.

The soundtrack was released on 19 October 2023, alongside the film's theatrical release date. The album, however, did not include the aforementioned tracks, but consisted of the earlier released three singles, along with "Glimpse of Antony Das" and "Glimpse of Harold Das", the tracks from the glimpse videos revealing Sanjay Dutt and Arjun's characters, and had separate releases, along with the track "Lokiverse 2.0"—a second version of the "Lokiverse" track that integrated the metal clanging sound of "The Hot Biriyani" from Kaithi, "Vikram Title Track" and "Rolex Theme" from Vikram, along with "Badass" and "Ratata".

On 20 October 2023, Anirudh said that apart from the aforementioned tracks, two other songs "Ordinary Person" and "Ratata" would be released as part of the extended soundtrack.

Song "Thaamara Poovukkum" from Pasumpon was reused in this movie during a coffee shop fight sequence.

=== Singles ===
"Bloody Sweet", the first song composed for Leo, was also cited by Anirudh as the fastest track he composed to that point. The track, which was featured in the two-minute promo video, was performed by Anirudh and Siddharth Basrur, and was released on 3 February 2023, the same day as the film's promo release, albeit not being part of an official single on the album.

"Naa Ready" was the first single from the film, sung by Vijay, along with Anirudh and Asal Kolaar, the latter performing rap portions; it was the fourth time Vijay had sung for Anirudh's composition after previously doing so for "Selfie Pulla" from Kaththi, "Kutti Story" from Master and "Jolly O Gymkhana" from Beast. The song released on 22 June 2023, coinciding with Vijay's 49th birthday. Although it was positively received by the audiences, it garnered criticism from politicians and activists over the glorification of smoking and drugs. This resulted the Central Board of Film Certification (CBFC) instructed the team to modify the visuals and lyrics, with immediate effect on 9 September 2023.

A song performed by Anirudh and Shakthisree Gopalan, was intended to be released as the second single from the album on 19 September 2023 (later deciphered to be "Villain Yaaru") but was not released on that date. Instead, "Badass" was released as the second single from the album on 28 September 2023.

Lalit, through the X (formerly Twitter) Space, announced that a family song was composed for the film, set to be released as the third single from the album titled "Anbenum", the song was sung by Anirudh with Lothika Jha performing the female vocals instead of Shakthisree, who would make her playback debut in Tamil, and was earlier scheduled for release on 9 October 2023. However, it was officially released two days later on 11 October 2023.

=== Cancelled audio launch plans ===
At the CII-Dakshin Media and Entertainment Summit, Lalit who had participated in the event, said that he initiated plans for an audio launch event in southern part of Tamil Nadu, instead of Chennai, and had zeroed on Madurai, Coimbatore and Trichy as the venues. In earlier August, it was reported that the film's audio launch will be instead held either in Malaysia or Dubai, and they tentatively planned for the event at Axiata Arena indoor stadium in Kuala Lumpur during late-September or early-October. However, plans for the event at Malaysia was being cancelled and the team instead planned to conduct the event at Jawaharlal Nehru Stadium in Chennai. Lalit later explained the reason for the cancellation as the venue was not available for their planned schedule.

It was reported that the event would be held on 30 September 2023 at the said venue. However, on 27 September 2023, three days before the event was to be held, the producers confirmed that the event would be cancelled citing safety constraints, while claiming that it was not due to political pressures. Trade analysts claimed that the overflowing requests of passes for the event had led the producers to cancel it, as around 70,000 people had pre-booked their passes for the event, while the venue itself could accommodate an audience of 6,000–8,000 people, and that poor management could lead to an unprecedented mishap. They cited the catastrophic incident that happened at A. R. Rahman's concert three weeks prior in Chennai as another reason for the cancellation.

=== Extended soundtrack ===
The track listing for the extended soundtrack was revealed on 20 October 2023, which included four unreleased songs. Along with the track list, the first song "Villain Yaaru" was released. It had lyrics written by Vishnu Edavan with Anirudh and Shakthisree performing. The second song "Ordinary Person" was released on 23 October 2023. It had lyrics written by Heisenberg and was performed by Nikhita Gandhi. The third song "I Am Scared" was released on 28 October 2023. The fourth song "Ratata" was released on 9 November 2023.

=== Video songs ===
The theme song for "Lokiverse 2.0" was released on 26 October 2023. The uncut video song for "Naa Ready" was released on 19 November 2023. The video song for "Anbenum" was released on 13 December 2023. The video song for "I'm Scared" was released on 14 December 2023. The video song for "Badass" was released on 15 December 2023.

== Track listing ==
=== Tamil ===
No.	Title	Lyrics	Singer(s)	Length
1.	"Bloody Sweet"	Heisenberg	Anirudh Ravichander, Siddharth Basrur	2:49
2.	"Naa Ready"	Vishnu Edavan, Asal Kolaar	Vijay, Anirudh Ravichander, Asal Kolaar	4:07
3.	"Glimpse of Antony Das"	—	Instrumental	0:40
4.	"Anbenum"	Vishnu Edavan	Anirudh Ravichander, Lothika	3:34
5.	"Glimpse of Harold Das"	—	Instrumental	0:42
6.	"Badass"	Vishnu Edavan	Anirudh Ravichander	3:49
7.	"Lokiverse 2.0"	—	Instrumental	1:54
Total length:				17:37

Extended soundtrack
No.	Title	Lyrics	Singer(s)	Length
1.	"Villain Yaaru"	Vishnu Edavan	Anirudh Ravichander, Shakthisree Gopalan	3:06
2.	"Ordinary Person"	Heisenberg	Nikhita Gandhi	2:21
3.	"I'm Scared"	Heisenberg	Anirudh Ravichander	2:26
4.	"Ratata"	—	Anirudh Ravichander	2:12
5.	"Leo Das Entry"	Heisenberg	Anirudh Ravichander	1:37
Total length:				11:42

=== Telugu ===
No.	Title	Lyrics	Singer(s)	Length
1.	"Bloody Sweet"	Heisenberg	Anirudh Ravichander, Siddharth Basrur	2:49
2.	"Ney Ready"	Raghu Ram	L. V. Revanth, Roll Rida, Ritesh G. Rao	4:07
3.	"Glimpse of Antony Das"	—	Instrumental	0:40
4.	"Prema Oh Aayudham"	Krishna Kanth	J. V. Sudhanshu, Priya Mali	3:34
5.	"Glimpse of Harold Das"	—	Instrumental	0:42
6.	"Badass"	Srinivasa Mouli	Anirudh Ravichander, Sri Krishna, Sai Charan	3:49
7.	"Lokiverse 2.0"	—	Instrumental	1:54
Total length:				17:37

Extended soundtrack
No.	Title	Lyrics	Singer(s)	Length
1.	"Villain Yevadu Ra"	Srinivasa Mouli	Manisha Eerabathini, Sampath GK	3:06

=== Kannada ===
No.	Title	Lyrics	Singer(s)	Length
1.	"Bloody Sweet"	Heisenberg	Anirudh Ravichander, Siddharth Basrur	2:49
2.	"Naa Ready"	Varadaraj Chikkaballapura	L. V. Revanth, Roll Rida, Ritesh G. Rao	4:07
3.	"Glimpse of Antony Das"	—	Instrumental	0:40
4.	"Anmbezhum Aayudham"	Deepak Ram	J. V. Sudhanshu, Priya Mali	3:34
5.	"Glimpse of Harold Das"	—	Instrumental	0:42
6.	"Badass"	Varadaraj Chikkaballapura	Anirudh Ravichander, Sri Krishna, Sai Charan	3:49
7.	"Lokiverse 2.0"	—	Instrumental	1:54
Total length:				17:37

Extended soundtrack
No.	Title	Lyrics	Singer(s)	Length
1.	"Villain Yaarava"	Varadaraj Chikkaballapura	Manisha Eerabathini, Sampath GK	3:06

=== Malayalam ===
No.	Title	Lyrics	Singer(s)	Length
1.	"Bloody Sweet"	Heisenberg	Anirudh Ravichander, Siddharth Basrur	2:49
2.	"Njan Ready"	Deepak Ram	L. V. Revanth, Arjun Vijay	4:07
3.	"Glimpse of Antony Das"	—	Instrumental	0:40
4.	"Anbezhum Aayudham"	Deepak Ram	J. V. Sudhanshu, Priya Mali	3:34
5.	"Glimpse of Harold Das"	—	Instrumental	0:42
6.	"Badass"	Deepak Ram	Anirudh Ravichander, Sri Krishna, Sai Charan	3:49
7.	"Lokiverse 2.0"	—	Instrumental	1:54
Total length:				17:37

Extended soundtrack
No.	Title	Lyrics	Singer(s)	Length
1.	"Villain Aarada"	Deepak Ram	Manisha Eerabathini, Sampath GK	3:06

=== Hindi ===
No.	Title	Lyrics	Singer(s)	Length
1.	"Bloody Sweet"	Heisenberg	Anirudh Ravichander, Siddharth Basrur	2:49
2.	"Ready Chal"	Raqueeb Alam	L.V. Revanth, Ritesh G Rao	4:07
3.	"Glimpse of Antony Das"	—	Instrumental	0:40
4.	"Tera Hi Jaadu Hai"	Raqueeb Alam	J. V. Sudhanshu, Priya Mali	3:34
5.	"Glimpse of Harold Das"	—	Instrumental	0:42
6.	"Badass"	Raqueeb Alam	Anirudh Ravichander, Hanuman	3:49
7.	"Lokiverse 2.0"	—	Instrumental	1:54
Total length:				17:37

Extended soundtrack
No.	Title	Lyrics	Singer(s)	Length
1.	"Villain Kaun Hai"	Raqueeb Alam	Manisha Eerabathini, Sampath GK	3:06

== Reception ==
=== Critical response ===
The Indian Express writing for the track "Naa Ready" called it a "typical Tamil ‘Kuthu’ number, which is sure to find lot of takers." Priyanka Goud of Pinkvilla stated it as a "perfect mass anthem" with Vijay's vocals and dance performance "make for a perfect treat to fans". Writing for the track "Badass", IndiaGlitz stated "Badass is Anirudh's super stylish tribute to Vijay's stardom. The track does complete justice to its title. It has powerful vocals by Anirudh and high octane lyrics penned by Vishnu Edavan."

Reviewing for The Quint, Pratikshya Mishra found "Naa Ready" to be "brilliant" and "toe-tapping track" while for the rest of the album comes "comes across more juvenile than effective and this even more jarring". Bhuvanesh Chandar of The Hindu summarised "The end credits soundtrack, the ‘I’m Scared’ surprise zinger, and the many callbacks to Vikram prove that composer Anirudh Ravichander remains the heartbeat of Lokesh's Cinematic Universe." Divya Nair of Rediff.com wrote Anirudh's "electrifying background music spices up the introduction and action sequences." M. Suganth of The Times of India wrote Anirudh's music "peaks in the second half". Janani K. of India Today summarised the music "amp up the masala moments quite well".

Anandu Suresh of The Indian Express wrote "Anirudh Ravichander’s soundtrack and background score also contribute significantly to the movie’s momentum. Departing from his typical star-worship compositions, Anirudh infuses Leo with exceptional tracks, adding a distinctive touch to the film." Priyanka Sundar of Firstpost wrote "Anirudh has yet again proved that his music can elevate a scene, add tension where required, hype wherever necessary and overall just keep the audiences hooked with sound."

=== Audience response ===
The track "Naa Ready" garnered 20 million views in 24 hours, setting the second highest viewed Tamil song in 24 hours, behind Vijay's own song "Arabic Kuthu" from Beast. It also garnered 1.6 million likes in 24 hours becoming also the second highest liked Tamil song in 24 hours, behind the same song. The song was also streamed 1 million times in Spotify in 24 hours. The second single "Badass" crossed 13 million views in 24 hours. "Naa Ready" emerged as Spotify's most-streamed Tamil track of 2023, as per Spotify Wrapped 2023.

== Controversy ==
The track "Ordinary Person" which was released as the second song from the extended soundtrack, was heavily inspired from the Otnicka and Duke Luke single "Peaky Blinder" which served as an influence to the British period drama television series Peaky Blinders (2013–2022). Otnicka claimed he was unaware of the song being sampled for this track and took to Instagram to address the same while he said that the situation was unclear as of now.

== Album credits ==
Credits adapted from Sony Music India.

- Anirudh Ravichander – singer (tracks: 1, 2, 4, 6, 8), composer (all tracks), producer (all tracks), musical arrangements (all tracks), Keyboard, Synth & Rhythm Programming
- Keba Jeremiah – acoustic guitar (track: 1, 4), electric guitar (track: 1, 4, 6), bass guitar (track: 1, 6)
- Balaji – cello (track: 4)
- Balasubramanian – cello supervision (track: 4)
- Maxwell – trumpet (tracks: 2)
- Ben – trumpet (track: 2)
- Rakesh – trumpet (track: 6)
- Roe Vincent – El Fé choir (track: 6)
- Tapas Roy – bouzouki, oud, octave mandolin, dobro guitar (track: 9)
- Manoj – solo violin (track: 9)
- Shashank Vijay – rhythm programming (all tracks)
- Kalyan – rhythm programming (track: 2)
- Arish – keyboard programming (all tracks)
- Pradeep PJ – keyboard programming (all tracks)
- OfRo – keyboard programming (track: 2)
- IC – keyboard programming (tracks: 4, 8, 9)
- Ananthakrrishnan – music advisor (all tracks), backing vocals (track: 1), solo violin (track: 8, 9)
- Harish Ram L H – music supervisor (all tracks), music editor (all tracks)
- Sajith Satya – creative consultant (all tracks), backing vocals (track: 1)
- Srinivasan M – recording engineer, mixing engineer (Albuquerque Records, Chennai) [all tracks]
- Shivakiran S – recording engineer (Albuquerque Records, Chennai) [all tracks]
- Joshua D. Fernandez – recording engineer (Offbeat Music Ventures, Chennai) [track: 2]
- Dinesh – recording engineer (Roadio by Voiceestore, Chennai) [track: 2]
- Rajesh Kannan – recording engineer (Albuquerque Records, Chennai) [tracks: 4, 6]
- Jishnu Vijayan – recording engineer (Albuquerque Records, Chennai) [tracks: 4, 6], keyboard programming (track: 4), vocal harmonies (track: 4)
- Biju James – recording engineer (UNO Records, Chennai) [track: 4]
- Pradeep Menon – recording engineer (AM Studios, Chennai) [track: 6]
- Manoj Raman – recording engineer (AM Studios, Chennai) [track: 6]
- Lokesh Vijayakumar – recording engineer (Vibe N Studios, Chennai) [track: 6]
- Pranjal Bora – recording engineer (Neo Studios, Mumbai) [track: 9]
- Vinay Sridhar – mixing engineer (Albuquerque Records, Chennai) [all tracks]
- Luca Pretolesi – mastering engineer (Studio DMI, Las Vegas) [all tracks]
- Abin Ponnachan – recording assistance
- Alistair Pintus – mastering assistance
- Velavan B – music co-ordinator
