= Naa Ready =

- Official song cover

Single by Vijay, Anirudh Ravichander and Asal Kolaar

from the album Leo
- Language: Tamil
- Released: 22 June 2023
- Recorded: 2023
- Studio: Albuquerque Records, Chennai; Studio DMI, Las Vegas
- Genre: EDM; kuthu; rap
- Length: 4:08
- Label: Sony Music
- Composer: Anirudh Ravichander
- Lyricist: Vishnu Edavan
- Producer: Anirudh Ravichander

Music video
- "Naa Ready" on YouTube

"Naa Ready" (transl. I Am Ready) is an Indian Tamil-language song and the first single in the soundtrack of the 2023 film Leo, directed by Lokesh Kanagaraj. Starring Vijay, Sanjay Dutt, and Arjun Sarja, the film is produced by S. S. Lalit Kumar under Seven Screen Studio. The track is composed by Anirudh Ravichander, and is sung by Vijay himself with the former as the co-singer and rap verses written and performed by Asal Kolaar, while the lyrics for the track were written by Vishnu Edavan.

The single was released on Vijay's birthday (22 June 2023), and became the second-most viewed Tamil song in a span of 24 hours.

== Background ==
"Naa Ready" marked the fourth time Vijay had sung for Anirudh's composition after previously doing so for "Selfie Pulla" from Kaththi (2014) "Kutti Story" from Master (2021) and "Jolly O Gymkhana" from Beast (2022). Vishnu Edavan, an assistant director of Lokesh had written lyrics for the song, after previously doing so for Master and Vikram.

== Music video ==
The music video was shot at the Adityaram Studios in Chennai during 6 to 11 June 2023, with Vijay, Sanjay Dutt, Mansoor Ali Khan, Arjun Sarja and Madonna Sebastian amongst others featuring. Originally supposed to be shot in May, with around 2000 background artists, the shooting was postponed due to scheduling conflicts. Over 500–600 background dancers participated in the song which was choreographed by Dinesh. The producers spent ₹7 crore (US$730,000) for shooting the song in a week. The music video for the song was released on 19 November 2023.

== Reception ==
=== Critical response ===
Priyanka Goud of Pinkvilla said "The first single promises a perfect mass anthem. The actor's singing and dance moves make for a perfect treat to fans", The Indian Express said "Naa Ready is a typical Tamil 'Kuthu' number, which is sure to find lot of takers", while India Today called it as "the season's perfect dance number".

=== Records ===
Naa Ready garnered 20 million views and 1.6 million likes in 24-hours on YouTube, setting the second highest viewed and liked Tamil song in that time span, behind Vijay's own song "Arabic Kuthu" from Beast. The song was streamed over a million times on Spotify upon release.

== Charts ==
Chart performances for "Naa Ready"
| Chart (2023) | Peak position |
|---|---|
| India (Billboard) Naa Ready | 14 |
| United Kingdom (Asian Music Chart Top 40) | 4 |

== Controversies ==
=== Smoking criticism ===
Despite the song's success, it also garnered criticism from politicians and activists over the glorification of smoking and drugs in the film, with Pattali Makkal Katchi president and MP Anbumani Ramadoss demanding Vijay to stop promoting smoking in his films. Chennai-based RTI Selvam filed an online complaint against the film with the Chennai Police Commissioner asking for action against Vijay under the Narcotic Drugs and Psychotropic Substances Act, stating that he was glorifying consumption of drugs. Selvam later submitted his complaint in person as well. Later, the makers added health disclaimers in the lyrical video whenever stills of Vijay smoking in the song appears.

On 9 September 2023, the Central Board of Film Certification (CBFC) instructed the team to modify the visuals and lyrics of the song for its screening in theatres. The song was further changed in the film as well.

=== Non-payment for background dancers ===
On 10 October 2023, one of the background dancers who worked in the song accused the producer Lalit Kumar in a video statement over the non-payment of dues, with several freelance dancers reached the office of the production house demanding the same. The production team clarified that the payment has been sent to the Tamil Nadu Film, Television Dancers & Dance Directors Union (TANTTNNIS) for the registered members.

R. K. Selvamani, the president of Film Employees Federation of South India (FEFSI) also clarified the aforementioned statement while adding that Lokesh interested on filming the song with 2,000 dancers. However, the union employs only 600, hence with the help of choreographer Dinesh Kumar, the team brought 1,400 freelance dancers who were not part of the union. The makers agreed to pay ₹1,750 per day with conveyance charges and bata, and deposited a sum of ₹9,460,500 (US$99,000) for the registered members and a sum of ₹10,500 (for six days) per person were credited to the respective bank accounts of the non-union dancers. He further added that the allegations against the producers were baseless.
