= Lokesh Cinematic Universe =

Indian shared universe

- Created by: Lokesh Kanagaraj
- Original work: Kaithi (2019)
- Owners: Dream Warrior Pictures; G Squad; Raaj Kamal Films International; Passion Studios; The Route; Seven Screen Studio; KVN Productions
- Years: 2019–present

Films and television
- Films: Kaithi (2019); Vikram (2022); Leo (2023)

Audio
- Soundtracks: Vikram (soundtrack); Leo (soundtrack)

Miscellaneous
- Budget: est. ₹395–545 crore (3 films)
- Box office: est. ₹1,124–1,220 crore (3 films)

The Lokesh Cinematic Universe (LCU), also known as the Lokiverse, is an Indian media franchise and shared universe of Tamil-language action thriller films created by Lokesh Kanagaraj. It is currently the second highest-grossing Tamil film franchise. The universe follows an elaborate conflict between law enforcement officers and vigilantes in India who are at war against dangerous drug cartels led by powerful crime lords.

The first film in the universe was Kaithi (2019), followed by Vikram (2022) and Leo (2023). It is set to continue with Benz, the first LCU film not to be directed by Lokesh, and Kaithi 2.

== Development ==
Lokesh Kanagaraj expressed his desire to create a shared universe of films after completing his debut feature, Maanagaram. He emphasized that such films have enduring appeal. During the production of Kaithi, he conceptualized and experimented with this idea, incorporating multiple open-ended plotlines in Kaithi. He further developed this concept in collaboration with Dream Warrior Pictures and Raaj Kamal Films International for his film Vikram, using properties owned by these production companies. As a result, he successfully established a shared universe and announced plans for additional projects set within this interconnected cinematic world. Though the name "Lokesh Cinematic Universe" was coined by netizens, post the release of Vikram, Lokesh accepted it as the official name of the universe. The franchise is also known as the Lokiverse, as Loki is his nickname. Narain, George Maryan and Maya S. Krishnan are the only actors who have reprised their roles in significant capacities across multiple LCU films. Karthi and Kamal Haasan have made voice-only cameo appearances, reprising their roles as Dilli in Vikram and Vikram in Leo, respectively.

== Feature films ==
Film	Release date	Director	Story	Screenplay	Dialogue	Production Company
Kaithi	25 October 2019	Lokesh Kanagaraj	Lokesh Kanagaraj	Lokesh Kanagaraj	Pon Parthiban; Lokesh Kanagaraj	Dream Warrior Pictures; Vivekananda Pictures
Vikram	3 June 2022	Lokesh Kanagaraj	Lokesh Kanagaraj	Lokesh Kanagaraj	Rathna Kumar; Lokesh Kanagaraj	Raaj Kamal Films International
Leo	19 October 2023	Lokesh Kanagaraj	Lokesh Kanagaraj	Lokesh Kanagaraj	Lokesh Kanagaraj; Rathna Kumar; Deeraj Vaidy	Seven Screen Studio

=== Kaithi (2019) ===
After a drug bust of 900 kilograms of cocaine belonging to drug dealers Adaikalam and Anbu in Trichy, Inspector Bejoy faces a dire situation when several cops are poisoned at a party by a corrupt cop in an attempt to recover the drugs and kill the officers involved in the bust. To thwart the gang, Bejoy blackmails ex-convict Dilli into assisting him by threatening to prevent him from meeting his 10-year-old daughter for the first time. Together, they embark on a mission to transport the poisoned cops to the hospital and prevent Anbu's gang from getting their hands on the busted drugs. Their journey is fraught with danger as they continuously evade pursuing gang members, who receive support from a corrupt narcotics official, Stephen Raj.

The first installment of the LCU, it stars Karthi in the lead role, along with Narain, Arjun Das, Harish Uthaman, George Maryan and Dheena in pivotal roles.

=== Vikram (2022) ===
Amar, a black ops agent, is assigned to investigate a series of murders committed by a masked group of vigilantes. Their victims include high-ranking officials from the narcotics department like Stephen Raj and ACP Prabhanjan, (Note: The murder happens a couple of months after the drug bust in Trichy, shown in Kaithi.) and Prabhanjan's seemingly harmless foster father, Karnan. As Amar delves deeper into the case, a tangled web of clues leads him to the mastermind behind the murders, a drug kingpin named Sandhanam, who controls the largest drug syndicate in Chennai. However, a surprising twist reveals that Karnan is, in fact, alive and is a former Black Ops Commander Vikram, who leads the group of vigilantes, that now includes Bejoy. In the face of this revelation, Vikram, Amar, and Bejoy unite their efforts to take down Sandhanam's powerful drug syndicate.

The second installment in the LCU stars Kamal Haasan, Vijay Sethupathi and Fahadh Faasil with Kalidas Jayaram, Narain and Chemban Vinod Jose in supporting roles. Suriya made his first appearance in the LCU in a cameo role as Rolex. The film is a spiritual successor of Vikram (1986).

=== Leo (2023) ===
Parthiban, a café owner and animal rescuer in Theog, becomes a local hero after killing a group of robbers in his café. This draws the attention of gangsters Antony and Harold Das, who track him since he resembles Antony's son, Leo Das. Parthiban denies having any connection to them but they continue to hound him, and he takes matters into his own hands by eliminating both Antony and Harold and destroying their datura factory after confessing that he is Leo, having left his past life behind. Following this, Vikram, knowing Parthi's identity as Leo, invites him to join forces in creating a drug-free society in India, while suggesting a mysterious connection between them from their past. (Note: As seen at the end of Leo.)

The third installment in LCU stars Vijay in the title role, alongside Trisha, Sanjay Dutt, Arjun Sarja, Gautham Vasudev Menon, Priya Anand and Madonna Sebastian with George Maryan as Napoleon and a voice-over cameo by Kamal Haasan as Agent Vikram. It is loosely inspired by the 2005 film A History of Violence, which is based off of the graphic novel of the same name.

=== Upcoming films ===
Film	Release Date	Director	Writer(s)	Production Company	Status
Benz	TBA	Bakkiyaraj Kannan	Lokesh Kanagaraj; Bakkiyaraj Kannan	Passion Studios; The Route; G Squad	Filming
Kaithi 2	TBA	Lokesh Kanagaraj	Lokesh Kanagaraj; S. R. Prabhu	Dream Warrior Pictures; KVN Productions	Pre-production

==== Benz ====
Lokesh announced a new action thriller film titled Benz, starring Raghava Lawrence, Samyuktha, Nivin Pauly and Ravi Mohan and directed by Bakkiyaraj Kannan on 14 April 2024. It is the first LCU film not directed by Lokesh. A teaser was unveiled on 29 October 2024, Lawrence's birthday, welcoming him into the universe. Filming began in May 2025, and the film was still under production a year later. On 31 May 2026, Lokesh announced the casting of Ravi. In an August interview, Nivin revealed that the film experienced multiple production delays, and that he still had thirty to thirty five days of shoot left.

==== Kaithi 2 ====
As implied at the end of Kaithi, Lokesh had planned for a sequel, which he confirmed after its release. In an interview with Subha J Rao to Firstpost, Lokesh conveyed his interest in developing the film into a franchise, stating that he had an idea for both the prequel and the sequel, which depends on the recurring schedules of the cast members.

Kaithi 2 is intended to be a prequel for Dilli, focusing on his character. Later, in an interaction with fans through Twitter, Lokesh explained about Anbu's return in Vikram as he was knocked out and not dead, explained by the stitch marks in his jaw, and this would be further explored in Kaithi 2.

Following the release and success of Vikram, S. R. Prabhu said the scale of Kaithi 2 would be bigger than the first film. However, the start of production has faced repeated delays due to Karthi and Lokesh prioritising other projects. Lokesh confirmed that he would work on Kaithi 2 after he completes a project with Allu Arjun, tentatively titled AA23.

== Short films ==
Name	Release date	Status
Chapter Zero	TBA	Post-Production

=== Chapter Zero ===
In late October 2024, Lokesh announced Chapter Zero, a 10-minute short film which would describe the inception of the universe before Kaithi.

== Additional crew and production details ==
Occupation	Films			
Occupation	Kaithi (2019)	Vikram (2022)	Leo (2023)	Benz (2027)
Director	Lokesh Kanagaraj	Lokesh Kanagaraj	Lokesh Kanagaraj	Bakkiyaraj Kannan
Story	Lokesh Kanagaraj	Lokesh Kanagaraj	Lokesh Kanagaraj	Lokesh Kanagaraj
Screenplay	Lokesh Kanagaraj	Lokesh Kanagaraj	Lokesh Kanagaraj	Bakkiyaraj Kannan
Dialogue	Lokesh Kanagaraj; Pon Parthiban	Lokesh Kanagaraj; Rathna Kumar	Lokesh Kanagaraj; Rathna Kumar; Deeraj Vaidy	Bakkiyaraj Kannan
Producer	S. R. Prakash Babu; S. R. Prabhu; Thiruppur Vivek	Kamal Haasan; R. Mahendran	S. S. Lalit Kumar; Jagadish Palanisamy	Sudhan Sundaram; Lokesh Kanagaraj; Jagadish Palanisamy
Composer	Sam C. S.	Anirudh Ravichander	Anirudh Ravichander	Sai Abhyankkar
Background Score	Sam C. S.	Anirudh Ravichander	Anirudh Ravichander	Sai Abhyankkar
Lyricist	Sam C. S. Sharanya Gopinath	Kamal Haasan; Vishnu Edavan; Heisenberg	Vishnu Edavan; Asal Kolaar; Heisenberg	TBA
Cinematographer	Sathyan Sooryan	Girish Gangadharan	Manoj Paramahamsa	Goutham George
Editor	Philomin Raj	Philomin Raj	Philomin Raj	Philomin Raj
Art Director	N. Sathees Kumar	N. Sathees Kumar	N. Sathees Kumar	Jacki
Stunt Director	Anbariv	Anbariv	Anbariv	Anal Arasu
Sound Designer	Sachin Sudhakaran; Hariharan M.	Sachin Sudhakaran; Hariharan M.	Sachin Sudhakaran; Hariharan M.	Arun S. Mani
Choreographer	–	Sandy	Dinesh	TBA
Costume Designer	Praveen Raja	Pallavi Singh; V. Sai; Kavitha J.	Pallavi Singh; Praveen Raja; Eka Lakhani	Dinesh Manoharan; Jeeva Karunya; Shruthi Manjari

== Future plans ==
In August 2023, Suriya revealed that a spin-off centred around his character Rolex from Vikram, was being planned. Two months later, Lokesh revealed his plans for two spin-off series with Napoleon from Kaithi and Agent Tina from Vikram, letting his assistants or other directors complete the same. In October 2024, Lokesh echoed Suriya's statement that a standalone Rolex film was being planned. In November 2024, he shared his plans for the franchise and the roadmap ahead. He said, "The opening (first film) was good. Now its structure is that there are only three films in the universe (so far). So, the fourth and fifth movies should be two basements, the sixth should be the pre-climax and the seventh or eighth should be the end. Going by that, I will get to do Kaithi 2, Rolex standalone and Vikram 2. If Vijay sir hadn't announced retirement, I would have done Leo 2 as well. Then Leo 2 or Vikram 2 would have been the final film. That's the maximum I can do with this universe".

== Music ==
Anirudh Ravichander composed the soundtracks and film scores for the LCU films under the label of Sony Music, except for Kaithi and Benz, which were composed respectively by Sam CS and Sai Abhyankkar under the label of Think Music.

=== Theme music ===
"Lokiverse" serves as the theme music for the franchise. It has two versions. The original version was featured in Vikram (2022), while the second version was featured in Leo (2023). The second version titled "Lokiverse 2.0" connected the elements of the franchise between the first three installments: Kaithi (2019), Vikram (2022) and Leo (2023).

=== Soundtracks ===
Title	Release date	Length	Composer(s)	Label	Ref
Vikram	15 May 2022	0:15:52	Anirudh Ravichander	Sony Music	
Leo	19 October 2023	0:22:57	Anirudh Ravichander	Sony Music	

=== Film scores ===
Title	Release date	Length	Composer(s)	Label	Ref
Kaithi	22 November 2019	0:28:18	Sam C. S.	Dream Warrior Pictures	
Vikram	7 July 2022	0:34:16	Anirudh Ravichander	Sony Music	
Leo	TBA	TBA	Anirudh Ravichander	Sony Music	

== Timeline ==
Lokesh Cinematic Universe timeline (as of Leo)
1991	Vikram flashback
1992–1998
1999	Leo flashback
2000–2018
2019	Kaithi
2019	Vikram
2020–2021
2022	Leo

An official timeline has not been released by the makers, but the films indicate this.

In the cinematic universe, the events in Kaithi unfold in the year 2019, followed by the events in Vikram, which transpire three months after the events in Kaithi. Subsequently, the events in Leo occur three years later in 2022. The flashback storylines in Vikram and Leo depict events from 1991 and 1999 respectively.

== Recurring cast and characters ==
List indicators

This section includes characters who will appear or have appeared in Lokesh Cinematic Universe.

- An empty grey cell indicates the character was not in the film, or that the character's official presence has not yet been confirmed.
- ^{C} indicates a cameo role.
- ^{M} indicates an appearance in onscreen movie footage.
- ^{V} indicates a voice-only role.
- ^{Y} indicates a younger version of the character.

Characters	Films		
Characters	Kaithi (2019)	Vikram (2022)	Leo (2023)
Introduced in Kaithi
Dilli	Karthi	Karthi^{V}	Mentioned (Note: In Leo, Dilli is mentioned by Napoleon during an interaction with Parthiban.)
Inspector Bejoy	Narain	Narain	
Anbu Das	Arjun Das	Arjun Das^{C}	
Adaikalam Das	Harish Uthaman	Harish Uthaman^{C}	
Stephen Raj	Hareesh Peradi	Hareesh Peradi^{C}	
Napoleon	George Maryan		George Maryan
Kamatchi	Dheena	Dheena^{C}	
Amudha	Baby Monica	Baby Monica^{C}	
Commander Arun Kumar Vikram / Karnan	Mentioned (Note: In the opening of Kaithi, Inspector Bejoy, portrayed by Narain, queries Ajaz Ahmad if there is any information about the "ghost". Vikram reveals that the "ghost" mentioned in Kaithi is Kamal Haasan's character, Vikram.)	Kamal Haasan	Kamal Haasan^{V}
Introduced in Vikram
Escort		Maya S. Krishnan	Maya S. Krishnan^{C}

== Reception ==
=== Box office performance ===
The Lokesh Cinematic Universe is currently the highest grossing Tamil film franchise.

Film	Release	Budget	Box office	Ref(s)
Kaithi	25 October 2019	₹25 crore (US$3.55 million)	₹105 crore (US$14.91 million)	
Vikram	3 June 2022	₹120 crore (US$15.27 million)	₹424 crore (US$53.94 million)–₹500 crore (US$63.61 million)	
Leo	19 October 2023	₹250 crore (US$30.27 million)–₹400 crore (US$48.43 million)	₹595 crore (US$72.03 million)–₹615 crore (US$74.46 million)	(Note: Leo's reported worldwide grosses vary between ₹5.95 billion (Box Office India) – ₹6.15 billion (Deccan Chronicle).)
Total		₹395 crore (US$41 million)–₹545 crore (US$57 million)	₹1,124 crore (US$120 million)–₹1,220 crore (US$130 million)	

=== Critical response ===
Film	Rotten Tomatoes
Kaithi	100% (7/10 average rating) (7 reviews)
Vikram	59% (5.6/10 average rating) (17 reviews)
Leo	82% (6.7/10 average rating) (11 reviews)

== In other media ==
In Karuppu (2026), Sandy Master and Janany Kunaseelan briefly reprise their roles from Leo, in a scene that pays homage to the film's café fight scene. Additionally, a character resembling Parthiban makes a faceless cameo in the same scene, portrayed by an unidentified actor.
