= Asal Kolaar =

Indian rapper and singer

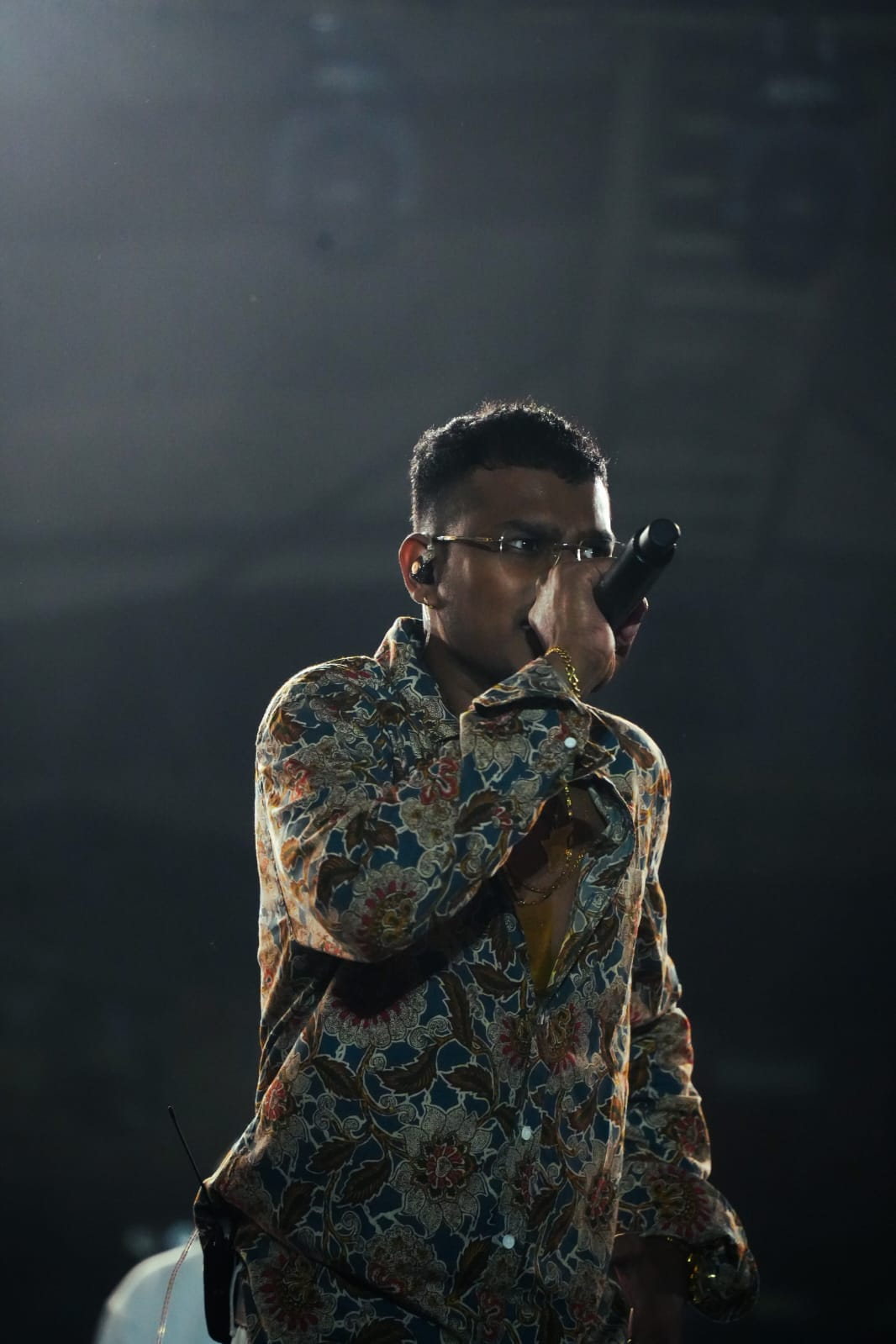

Background information
- Born: Vasanthakumar Bakthavachalam
- Genres: Tamil rap, hip hop, gaana
- Occupations: Rapper, singer, lyricist
- Years active: 2019–present

Vasanthakumar Bakthavachalam, known professionally as Asal Kolaar, is an Indian rapper, singer, and lyricist who works predominantly in Tamil cinema. He gained prominence in the Tamil independent music scene through the viral success of the song "Jorthaale" and later expanded into Tamil cinema through collaborations with leading composers and actors.

== Early life ==
Asal Kolaar was born as Vasanthakumar Bakthavachalam in Chennai, Tamil Nadu. He developed an interest in rap music and songwriting during his school years and later became involved in Chennai's independent music culture.

== Career ==
=== Independent music ===
Asal Kolaar began his musical career through independent rap releases and collaborations with producer OfRo and the Atti Culture collective. His breakthrough came with "Jorthaale", which became a viral success and helped introduce a new audience to Tamil independent rap music.

The success of his independent releases established him as one of the notable emerging voices in contemporary Tamil rap.

=== Film music ===
Following the popularity of his independent music, Asal Kolaar entered the Tamil film industry and contributed songs to several feature films.

In 2023, he gained wider recognition through "Naa Ready", a song from the film Leo, starring Vijay (who was also the lead singer) and composed by Anirudh Ravichander. The song received significant media attention upon release and became one of the most-viewed Tamil songs of the year. However, it later underwent modifications following certification requirements from the Central Board of Film Certification (CBFC). During the production period of Leo, media coverage surrounding Vijay's filming schedules and the popularity of Naa Ready further increased public attention on artists associated with the soundtrack, including Asal Kolaar.

He later contributed to additional film soundtracks and continued collaborations with composers and artists across the Tamil film industry.

=== Television ===
In 2022, Asal Kolaar participated as a contestant in the reality television program Bigg Boss Tamil 6, hosted by Kamal Haasan.

In 2025, he appeared as a guest judge on the music reality show Super Singer Junior 10.

== Musical style ==
Asal Kolaar's music combines elements of Tamil rap, gaana, hip hop and urban independent music. His lyrics frequently incorporate Chennai slang and local cultural references. Music journalists have identified him as part of a new generation of Tamil rap artists who transitioned from independent digital platforms into mainstream cinema.

== Filmography ==
| Year | Film | Role | Notes |
|---|---|---|---|
| 2024 | Vettaiyan | Guna | |

== Discography ==
=== Selected independent singles ===
- Champagini
- ICEBOY
- Jorthaale
- Vaanaambaa
- Adi Odi
- Paiya Dei
- Asal Kolaar 416

=== Film credits ===
| Year | Film | Language | Song | Composer | Co-singer(s) | Notes |
|---|---|---|---|---|---|---|
| 2021 | Parris Jeyaraj | Tamil | "Kaava Ulla" | Santhosh Narayanan | | Co-lyricist with Rokesh |
| 2021 | Parris Jeyaraj | Tamil | "Mustaache Vestaache" | Santhosh Narayanan | | Also lyricist |
| 2021 | Bachelor | Tamil | "Life of Bachelor" | A. H. Kaashif | Navakkarai Naveen Prabanjam, A. H. Kaashif | Also lyricist |
| 2021 | Arjuna Phalguna | Telugu | "Fast Fast Vadiley" | Priyadarshan Balasubramanian | Priyadarshan Balasubramanian | Lyricist alongside Lakshmi Priyanka and Swathi Kiran Murty |
| 2022 | Parole | Tamil | "Mera Madha Margaya" | Rajkumar Amal | | Co-lyricist with Rajkumar Amal |
| 2022 | Mahaan | Tamil | "Pona Povura" | Santhosh Narayanan | Gaana Muthu | Also lyricist |
| 2022 | Coffee with Kadhal | Tamil | "Baby Gurl" | Yuvan Shankar Raja | Yuvan Shankar Raja | |
| 2022 | Coffee with Kadhal | Tamil | "Baby Gurl (Reprise)" | Yuvan Shankar Raja | Yuvan Shankar Raja, Sid Sriram | |
| 2022 | Naai Sekar Returns | Tamil | "Appatha" | Santhosh Narayanan | Vadivelu, Santhosh Narayanan | Co-lyricist alongside Durai |
| 2023 | Rudhran | Tamil | "Jorthaale" | OfRo | OfRo, MC Vickey | Also lyricist Reused from his previous single |
| 2023 | King of Kotha | Malayalam | "Kotha Raja" | Jakes Bejoy | Dabzee, Roll Rida, Resmi Sateesh | Lyricist alongside Muhsin Parari and Roll Rida |
| 2023 | King of Kotha (D) | Tamil | "Kotha Raja" | Jakes Bejoy | Dabzee, Roll Rida, Resmi Sateesh | Lyricist alongside Muhsin Parari and Roll Rida |
| 2023 | King of Kotha (D) | Telugu | "Kotha Raja" | Jakes Bejoy | Dabzee, Roll Rida, Resmi Sateesh | Lyricist alongside Muhsin Parari and Roll Rida |
| 2023 | Custody | Telugu | "Head Up High" | Yuvan Shankar Raja | Arun Kaundinya | |
| 2023 | Custody | Tamil | "Head Up High" | Yuvan Shankar Raja | Arun Kaundinya | |
| 2023 | Mark Antony | Tamil | "Adhirudha" | G. V. Prakash Kumar | T. Rajendar | Also lyricist |
| 2023 | Leo | Tamil | "Naa Ready" | Anirudh Ravichander | Vijay, Anirudh Ravichander | Co-lyricist alongside Vishnu Edavan |
| 2023 | Fight Club | Tamil | "Viyugam" | Jakes Bejoy | | Also lyricist |
| 2024 | Malayalee from India | Malayalam | "World Malayalee Anthem" | Jakes Bejoy | Akshay Unnikrishnan, Jakes Bejoy | Lyricist alongside Sharis Mohammed and Suhail Koya |
| 2024 | Guruvayoor Ambalanadayil | Malayalam | "K For Kabaradakkam" | Ankit Menon | | Co-lyricist alongside Vinayak Sasikumar |
| 2025 | Coolie | Tamil | "Monica" | Anirudh Ravichander | Sublahshini, Anirudh Ravichander | Co-lyricist alongside Vishnu Edavan |
| 2026 | Kadhal Reset Repeat | Tamil | "Yamma Ghajini" | Harris Jayaraj | Suchith Suresh, Senthil Dass, Tamizh Adhavan | |
| 2026 | Karuppu | Tamil | "Naanga Naalu Peru" | Sai Abhyankkar | Silambarasan, Sai Abhyankkar | Co-lyricist alongside Arun Srinivasan |
| 2026 | Jana Nayagan | Tamil | "Jana Nayagan Rap Track" | Anirudh Ravichander | | |

=== As lyricist ===
| Year | Film | Language | Song | Composer | Singer(s) | Notes |
|---|---|---|---|---|---|---|
| 2021 | Parris Jeyaraj | Tamil | "Puli Manga Pulip" | Santhosh Narayanan | Gana Muthu | Co-lyricist alongside Rokesh |
| 2022 | Gulu Gulu | Tamil | "Inner Peace" | Santhosh Narayanan | | |
| 2023 | Soppana Sundari | Tamil | "Soodam Karpooram" | Ajmal Tahseen | Anthony Daasan | |
