= Parris Jeyaraj =

2021 Indian film by Johnson K

- Theatrical release poster
- Directed by: Johnson K
- Written by: Johnson K
- Produced by: K Kumar
- Starring: Santhanam; Anaika Soti; Prudhvi Raj; Motta Rajendran
- Cinematography: Arthur A. Wilson
- Edited by: Prakash Mabbu
- Music by: Santhosh Narayanan
- Production company: Lark Studios
- Distributed by: Lark Studios
- Release date: 12 February 2021 (India)
- Running time: 140 minutes
- Country: India
- Language: Tamil

Parris Jeyaraj is a 2021 Indian Tamil-language romantic comedy film, directed by Johnson K, and produced by K Kumar. The film stars Santhanam and Anaika Soti, with Prudhvi Raj and Motta Rajendran appearing in supporting roles. The film's music is composed by Santhosh Narayanan, with cinematography handled by Arthur A. Wilson and editing by Prakash Babu. It was released on 12 February 2021, opening mixed to positive reviews and it became a success in the box office.

== Plot ==
Parris Jeyaraj, a small-time YouTube singer, resorts to drinking after a heartbreak inflicted upon him by his father. Unknown to the fact that she is his father's second wife's daughter, he falls in love with Dhivya after meeting her at an event at her college. Dhivya, also reeling from a love failure because of her father, falls for him without knowing that Parris is the son of her father with his first wife. Little did they know that their relationship would face unexpected trouble with their father being the same. Jeyaraj's father, Prakash Raj, finds that his daughter and son are in love and thus, puts his best foot forward to separate them. Meanwhile, Dhivya's ex-boyfriend also comes back, with an apology for her, with the help of his father and uncle, who were trying to kill Prakash Raj. It is then that Parris' father reveals the truth that he had married twice and that Dhivya and Parris are siblings. Enraged, Parris leaves through the stairs where he meets the brother of Prakash Raj's second wife. He reveals the truth about Dhivya not being Prakash's daughter and that Parris can marry her. However, by the time Parris gets there, Dhivya has already gotten married, and so he leaves silently.

Several months later, Parris arrives to perform at a wedding. There, he meets a girl whom he first asks for the area she is from. She mentions being from Chengalpattu. He then asks what her father’s name was, to which she answers 'Raj'. Finally, he asks for her father's photo, to which she responds by introducing Parris to her father in person. Parris is shocked, and equal parts enraged, to discover Prakash Raj as someone else's father again. Furious at his father's numerous love children, he yells at him and throws the mic away.

== Cast ==
- Santhanam as Parris Jeyaraj, son of Prakash Raj and revealed to be the half brother of Dhivya
- Anaika Soti as Dhivya, daughter of Prakash Raj and his second wife, and half-sister of Jeyaraj
- Prudhvi Raj as Adv. Prakash Raj, father of Jeyaraj and Dhivya
- Motta Rajendran as Venkat's father (Guru/Bhagavan/Kadavul/Iraivan)
- Lollu Sabha Maaran as Venkat's uncle
- R. S. Shivaji as Arokkiyasaamy
- Mahanadi Shankar as Inspector Ponmaanickam
- Ganeshkar as the waiter
- Thangadhurai as Local Don
- Seshu as Temple Priest
- Thangakili
- G. L. Sethuraman as Vandu, Jeyaraj's neighbor
- Vivanth as Dr Venkat, Dhivya's ex-boyfriend
- George Vishnu as Nalina's brother
- Sharmila as Ramani, Parris Jeyaraj's mother
- Sastika Rajendran as Arokkiyasaamy's daughter
- Sangeetha V as Nalina, Dhivya's mother
- Kaavya Sha as Hamsa
- Aarthi Ramkumar as Payal, Venkat's mother
- KPY Vinodh as Prakash Raj's assistant
- Teju Ashwini as Prakash Raj's daughter (special appearance in the song "Puli Manga Pulipu")
- Santhosh Narayanan in a special appearance in the song 'Mustache Vestache"
- Sandy in a special appearance in the song "Puli Manga Pulipu"

== Production ==
Following the relative commercial success of A1 (2019), director Johnson and Santhanam discussed potential film ideas together and announced that they would work on a gangster-based comedy film during January 2020. In the original premise, Santhanam was set to play a gangster from North Madras who would attempt to take over the mantle from an ageing Malaysian don. The film's shoot was planned for Chennai, Madurai and Malaysia, and Anaika Soti was signed to play the female lead. However, the COVID-19 pandemic meant that the international element became unfeasible and Johnson reworked the script during the COVID-19 lockdown in India, finalising a script where Santhanam would portray a gaana singer from North Madras. The team chose the title of Parris Jeyaraj, a pun on the name of music composer Harris Jayaraj. The title of the film was announced publicly during December 2020 after initially progressing without media attention.

At the audio release function for the film, Johnson's speech attracted controversy, with media reports noting that he turned up to the event intoxicated.

== Soundtrack ==
Parris Jeyaraj

Soundtrack album by Santhosh Narayanan
- Released: 28 January 2021
- Recorded: 2020–2021
- Genre: Feature film soundtrack
- Length: 18:30
- Label: Think Music
- Producer: Santhosh Narayanan

Santhosh Narayanan chronology
Penguin (2020)	Parris Jeyaraj (2021)	Karnan (2021)

The soundtrack album is composed by Santhosh Narayanan collaborating with Santhanam and Johnson after A1 (2019); lyrics for the songs were written by Rokesh, Asal Kolaar, Madras Miran. Out of five tracks, "Priya Priya" sung by Gana Muthu and Isaivani was taken from the trio's previous film A1, composed by himself. The song "Puli Manga Pulip" became a chartbuster upon release.

Track listing
No.	Title	Lyrics	Singer(s)	Length
1.	"Bacha Bachikey"	Rokesh, Madras Miran	Santhosh Narayanan	4:48
2.	"Kaava Ulla"	Rokesh, Asal Kolaar	Asal Kolaar	3:41
3.	"Puli Manga Pulip"	Rokesh, Asal Kolaar	Gana Muthu	2:58
4.	"Mustaache Vestaache"	Asal Kolaar	Asal Kolaar	3:39
5.	"Priya Priya"	Rokesh	Gana Muthu, Isaivani	3:24
Total length:				18:30

== Release ==
The film was theatrically released on 12 February 2021, coinciding with the Valentine's Day weekend.

== Reception ==
The film received a positive review from the critic at The Hindu, who noted "Whilst it still is a typical Santhanam film, Parris Jeyaraj has an engaging narrative. Importantly, it does not have the pull-out-your-hair-kind of humour". Cinema Express gave the film a mixed review, noting " If Parris Jeyaraj is assessed only as a modern gaana album, it would get full points for engagement and quirkiness, but alas! It is a film, and one that collapses badly when the rest of the elements come into play." Sify called the film a "watchable comedy entertainer".
