= Fight Club (2023 film) =

2023 Indian film by Abbas A. Rahmath

- Theatrical release poster
- Directed by: Abbas A. Rahmath
- Screenplay by: Abbas A. Rahmath
- Story by: Sasi Nandhagopal
- Dialogues by: Vijay Kumar; Sasi Nandhagopal; Abbas A. Rahmath; Vishnu Edavan; Nijanthan
- Produced by: Aditya; Lokesh Kanagaraj (presenter)
- Starring: Vijay Kumar; Monisha Mohan Menon
- Cinematography: Leon Britto
- Edited by: P. Kripakaran
- Music by: Govind Vasantha
- Production companies: Reel Good Films; G Squad
- Distributed by: Sakthi Film Factory
- Release date: 15 December 2023
- Running time: 137 minutes
- Country: India
- Language: Tamil

Fight Club is a 2023 Indian Tamil-language action thriller film directed by Abbas A. Rahmath in his directorial debut and produced by Aditya and Lokesh Kanagaraj under Reel Good Films and G Squad. It stars Vijay Kumar and Monisha Mohan Menon in the lead roles, along with Kartheekeyan Santhanam and Shankar Thas in supporting roles.

The film was announced in November 2023. Principal photography commenced and had wrapped before the announcement. The film has music composed by Govind Vasantha, with cinematography handled by Leon Britto and editing by P. Kripakaran. Fight Club was theatrically released on 15 December 2023.

== Plot ==
In North Chennai, Benjamin alias "Benji", a former talented boxer, gets sidelined by drugs and liquor. Despite his struggles, Benji aims to provide a chance to mentor young talented boys in their region to stay away from crime. Trouble arises for Benji as his brother Joseph joins Kiruba, a notorious gangster and drug peddler, in committing illegal activities. Benji learns about this and warns Joseph and Kiruba. Later, Kiruba and Joseph succeed in finishing Benji, but Kiruba betrays Joseph and sends him to prison.

Selva, a hot-headed football player who idolised Benji, gets disillusioned with life due to Benji's death and becomes an alcoholic. Joseph returns to his neighbourhood after completing his prison sentence, where he learns that Kiruba has become a politician. To exact vengeance against Kiruba, Joseph manipulates Selva, along with other youths; Robert, Mani and Murthy, to wage a war against Kiruba. Selva clashes with Karthi, Kiruba's brother-in-law, as Karthi was after a girl Selva liked.

Kiruba warns Karthi to not fight with Selva and his gang, but Karthi fights with Selva regarding a loudspeaker issue and Robert's brother Viji ends up in the hospital. Kiruba wanted to stay away from Selva as he could kill him for Benji's death, where he makes a deal with Selva that Karthi will not trouble him any more. However, the agreement did not hold for too long and the fights continued between Selva and Karthi. In the midst of the mayhem, Joseph gets Robert, Mani and Murthy to sell weed to Karthi's men, knowing that Karthi would thrash them.

Joseph supplies weapons to kill Karthi, but the plan backfires and Kiruba kills Robert. Mani and Murthy tell Selva about Joseph using Robert's anger to finish Kiruba. Selva realises that the mayhem had increased after Joseph's return and the boys would not live peacefully in the neighbourhood due to Joseph and Kiruba. Selva kills Kiruba and Joseph, where he becomes a football coach and also fulfill's Benji's goal of mentoring and training young talented boys.

== Cast ==
- Vijay Kumar as Selva
  - Raaghav as Young Selva
- Kartheekeyan Santhanam as Benjamin "Benji"
- Monisha Mohan Menon as Shailu
- Jeyaraj
- Shankar Thas as Kiruba
- Avinash Raghudevan as Joseph
- Saravana Vel as Karthi
- Daffe Naveen as Robert (credited as Naveen Vikram)
- Jeeva Rathinam as Benjamin aka Benji
- Aadhira Pandilakshmi as Malathy
- Thirunavukkarasu as Nagaraj
- Moorthy as Selva's father

== Production ==
In November 2023, Reel Good Films announced their maiden venture titled Fight Club, which features Vijay Kumar in the lead role and Abbas A Rahmath in his directorial debut. The technical crew consists of music composer Govind Vasantha, cinematographer Leon Britto and editor P. Kripakaran. Vijay Kumar wrote the first draft around 2014–15, with the focus being on football and how many juveniles turn to crime. The project did not enter production, and with the release of Bigil, Vada Chennai and other similar-themed films over the next few years, Vijay had to rewrite the script substantially to avoid unintended similarities. Fight Club was intentionally titled after the 1999 American film, but serves as a tribute rather than a remake.

== Music ==
The music and background score is composed by Govind Vasantha. The song "Thaalam" samples "En Jodi Manja Kuruvi" from Vikram (1986).

Track listing
No.	Title	Lyrics	Singer(s)	Length
1.	"Yaarum Kaanadha"	Karthik Netha	Kapil Kapila, Keerthana Vaidyanaathan	3:47
2.	"Viyugam"	Asal Kolaar	Asal Kolaar	2:38
3.	"Raavanamavan"	Arivu	Arivu	3:11
4.	"Thaalam"	GKB	Govind Vasantha, Anthony Daasan	3:11
Total length:				12:37

== Release ==
Fight Club was released on 15 December 2023.

=== Home media ===
The streaming and satellite rights of the film were acquired by Disney+ Hotstar and Star Vijay. The film began streaming there from 27 January 2024.

== Reception ==
M. Suganth of The Times of India gave 3.5/5 stars and described "Sasi's story is familiar, but the filmmaking makes the film engaging." Kirubhakar Purushothaman of The Indian Express gave 3/5 stars and wrote "A lot of Fight Club can be brushed aside as redundant fight scenes, but each one of them increases the intensity of the problem that warrants its existence." Bharathy Singaravel of The News Minute gave 2.5/5 stars and wrote "Fight Club quickly becomes too much of an ‘excellent thing’ and in the absence of a consistently-paced story, it is exhausting trying to remain emotionally invested amid all the sound and fury."

Hridayambika. A. Manu of OTTplay gave 2.5/5 stars and wrote "Although Fight Club has good performances and cinematography, the Abbas A. Rahmath directorial’s storyline makes it a confusing watch. If you're looking for a screenplay-based action drama, you can skip this one." Janani. K of India Today gave 2/5 stars and wrote "Fight Club could have been much more impactful had it given more importance to the screenplay as much as it had given the technical aspects."

Gopinath Rajendran of The Hindu wrote "Despite some impeccable action sequences, Vijay Kumar’s ‘Fight Club’ doesn't live up to its true potential thanks to the wafer-thin plot and predictable writing." S. V. Harshini of Film Companion wrote "The film 'tells' more than it 'shows', which leaves you disappointed because its action-packed atmosphere is clever and engrossing."
