= Kaithi (2019 film) =

2019 Indian film by Lokesh Kanagaraj

- Theatrical release poster
- Directed by: Lokesh Kanagaraj
- Screenplay by: Pon Parthiban; Lokesh Kanagaraj
- Story by: Lokesh Kanagaraj
- Produced by: S. R. Prakashbabu; S. R. Prabhu; Thiruppur Vivek
- Starring: Karthi; Narain; Arjun Das
- Cinematography: Sathyan Sooryan
- Edited by: Philomin Raj
- Music by: Sam C. S.
- Production companies: Dream Warrior Pictures; Vivekananda Pictures
- Distributed by: Dream Warrior Pictures
- Release date: 25 October 2019
- Running time: 146 minutes
- Country: India
- Language: Tamil
- Budget: ₹25 crore
- Box office: est. ₹105 crore

Kaithi (transl. Prisoner) is a 2019 Indian Tamil-language action thriller film directed by Lokesh Kanagaraj. Produced by Dream Warrior Pictures and Vivekananda Pictures, it is the first instalment in the Lokesh Cinematic Universe. The film stars Karthi in the titular role, alongside Narain, Arjun Das, Harish Uthaman, Mariyam George and Dheena. In the film, taking place mainly within one night, a recently released prisoner drives poisoned policemen to a hospital while evading criminals, in exchange for meeting his daughter.

Lokesh initially worked on two scripts after the success of Maanagaram, which he scrapped working on due to issues regarding the extensive research and casting process, until he came across a news article about an ex-prisoner's life. He initially wanted Mansoor Ali Khan to play the lead role, but during the writing process, Karthi was asked to play the lead with the scale of the budget being increased further. Principal photography began in December 2018 and was completed by August 2019. The film was largely shot at night. It is a songless film with a score composed by Sam C. S. The cinematography and editing were handled by Sathyan Sooryan and Philomin Raj respectively.

Kaithi was released on October 25, 2019, ahead of the Diwali festival. The film received positive reviews from critics and became a box-office success, grossing ₹105 crore worldwide, making it one of the highest-grossing Tamil films of 2019. It was further selected for official screening at the International Indian Film Festival Toronto (IIFFT) in August 2020 and won two Ananda Vikatan Cinema Awards, three Norway Tamil Film Festival Awards, South Indian International Movie Awards, and four Zee Cine Awards respectively. Kaithi is the first installment of the Lokesh Cinematic Universe, which is followed up in Vikram, with Narain reprising his role as Bejoy while George Maryan reprises his role as Napoleon in Leo. A sequel titled Kaithi 2 is in development.

== Plot ==
The police, led by Inspector Bejoy, intercept a van transporting 900 kilograms of cocaine valued at over ₹800 crores. They keep the narcotics and those involved at the commissioner's office. The bust threatens the operations of Adaikalam, a notorious drug lord based in Trichy, whose identity remains unknown to the authorities. In retribution, his brother Anbu plots to retrieve the seized drugs and eliminate the officers responsible.

During a retirement party for the Inspector General, the city's senior police officers are drugged by mixing Rohypnol with alcohol rendering them unconscious. Bejoy, who abstains due to medication, remains unaffected. To prevent public panic, he attempts to move the officers covertly to a hospital. He enlists the help of Dilli, a recently released prisoner detained for suspicious behaviour, by leveraging his desire to reunite with his daughter, Amudha, who is waiting at an orphanage. Kamatchi, a caterer at the party, aids them, and they use his truck to transport the incapacitated officers. Meanwhile, Anbu places a bounty on the police officers, prompting gang members to pursue the group. Paalpandi, a corrupt officer pretending to be unconscious, helps them.

At the commissioner's office, Bejoy instructs Constable Napoleon and a group of college students detained for drunk driving to secure the premises and prevent Anbu's men from accessing the building or freeing the detainees. En route, Dilli defends the group against multiple gang attacks.

Bejoy later learns that Adaikalam himself is among the captured smugglers. Although Bejoy momentarily negotiates a deal between Napoleon and Anbu for a prisoner exchange, he cancels it upon this discovery. Anbu infiltrates the commissioner's office, but the students subdue him. As Dilli, Kamatchi, and Bejoy near the office after getting the unconscious officers to a hospital, a gang, led by Anbu's lieutenant, Tips, ambushes them. Paalpandi, pretending to have recovered, stabs Dilli, and Bejoy is overpowered. Ajaz Ahmed, Bejoy's informant inside Anbu's gang, is killed by Tips. Dilli recovers and defeats the attackers, rescues Bejoy and Kamatchi, and kills Tips and Paalpandi.

Back at the commissioner's office, Anbu orders the execution of one of the students, prompting Napoleon to subdue him with a fire extinguisher. Adaikalam, witnessing this, vows revenge. Dilli enters the building through a hidden passage and helps the students escape. Subsequently, he and Napoleon set out to destroy the narcotics. They find a confiscated M134 minigun and use it to eliminate Anbu's forces. A doctor revives the unconscious officers, and Stephen Raj, the corrupt Zonal Head of the Narcotics Division, is arrested for his involvement in Anbu's plot.

Bejoy thanks Dilli and promises him a better life. Dilli is reunited with Amudha, brought by his probation officer, Nalini. In the final scene, as Dilli, Amudha, and Kamatchi walk away toward a new life, Adaikalam, from his prison cell, implies that he knows Dilli personally.

== Cast ==
- Karthi as Dilli, an ex-convict
- Narain as Inspector Bejoy
- Arjun Das as Anbu Das
- George Maryan as Constable Napoleon
- Harish Uthaman as Adaikalam, Anbu's older brother
- Dheena as Kaamaatchi
- Baby Monica as Amudha, Dilli's daughter
- Ramana as Tips, Anbu's henchmen
- Amjath as Ram
- Kanna Ravi as Ajaz Ahmed / Sampath
- Hareesh Peradi as Stephen Raj, a corrupt narcotics official
- Arun Alexander as Paalpaandi, a corrupt cop
- Vatsan Chakravarthi as Ajay
- Udayaraj as a college student
- Kishore Rajkumar as Ashok, a college student
- Lallu as Chittu, a college student
- Deepthi as Thamizh, a college student
- Krishnamoorthi as K. Venkat
- Malavika Avinash as Nalini, Probation officer (uncredited)
- Chetan as Dr Amudhan (uncredited)
- R. N. R. Manohar as an IG (uncredited)
- Pugazh as a victim's relative (uncredited)

== Production ==
=== Origin ===
After the success of Maanagaram (2017), director Lokesh Kanagaraj had rejected several offers from various production houses as he did not want to "succumb to the pressure of staying relevant in the industry by signing back-to-back projects". Nonetheless, since he was already assigned to direct a project for the producers of Maanagaram, S. R. Prakash Babu and S. R. Prabhu under the company Dream Warrior Pictures, he began research to develop a script, but the project failed to materialise as he needed more time for research works. Lokesh began developing another script, but this was also dropped. He came upon a news article about an ex-prisoner that instantly caught its attention and decided to work on the script.

Lokesh examined his previous film, which was set in a span of 48 hours, and developed the script of Kaithi, which takes place largely in a single night, with the characters, story and setting revolving in the short time-span, but in a different genre – action. Eventually, he worked on the final draft that consisted of 45 pages and sent it to Prabhu's office, which Lokesh felt that "given the size of the script, he was perplexed when I handed it over to him". The film did not have a female lead or songs in the film, which was considered unique for Tamil cinema as Lokesh himself insisted that it "wasn't such a barrier to not have a heroine or a song in a commercial film". Vivekananda Pictures, an established film production company in 1980s, also co-produced and distributed this project with Tiruppur Vivek as the producer, thereby marking its return to film production after two decades.

=== Development ===
"In the beginning, when I was writing for Mansoor Ali Khan, the script had that wacky element you'd associate with him. But when Karthi sir came onboard, I wanted to change the character arc to include some of the things we were familiar with, even though he was fine with the original characterisation. So I took another 20 days, rewrote his character without removing anything that excited him during the narration. He liked the new arc and how he behaves. We didn't change any major scenes or plot lines for it, though."

— Lokesh Kanagaraj, in an interview with Baradwaj Rangan

Lokesh stated that the script was initially written with Mansoor Ali Khan in mind for playing the lead actor, but as the process of writing went forth, the stature of the lead character went bigger, and demanded a popular actor to play the lead role, thereby increasing the scale of the film. Prabhu later narrated the one-liner of the story to Karthi, during the shooting of his film Theeran Adhigaaram Ondru, which he had interested. After Lokesh's narration of the script, he immediately agreed to work on the film. In an interview with Srivatsan S of The Hindu, he stated that since the film "doesn't have songs or a heroine, people assumed it would be under two hours. See, that's how they are conditioned. The entire movie takes place in a single night but it needed to be told in that stipulated duration".

Lokesh wanted to expand the film after Karthi's inclusion, and as a result, Pon Parthiban was hired to write the additional screenplay and dialogues for the film, as per Karthi's insistence, as he appreciated his work in Kaatrin Mozhi (2018). The film was launched on 12 December 2018, with the announcement of the technical crew – Sam C. S. as the composer, Sathyan Sooryan as the cinematographer, Philomin Raj as the editor, who previously worked in Lokesh's Maanagaram, and the action choreographer duo Anbariv – being included in the film. In March 2019, the first look of the film was released, with the title also being revealed as Kaithi.

=== Characters ===
"Lokesh sir called me for the audition and asked me to perform a scene from the film, which didn't make the final cut. Once I finished, he said I'd be playing Anbu and that I would have to lead a gang of 100 members. I got [intimidated] on hearing this. I had zero confidence when I stepped into the project, but the team was encouraging and the faith Lokesh had on me made me give my best."

— Arjun Das, in an interview with The New Indian Express.

Karthi plays the role of Dilli, an ex-convict, whose character was "physically and emotionally demanding". He stated that "It might be something I've not done before, something I can convert into a challenge for myself, or a film I'd like to watch as an audience [...] And, during that climax scene, we were all in that zone where we were pitch-perfect, where we were giving our very best. We actually felt like a family. As an actor, that's such a wonderful space to be in. It's almost addictive."

Lokesh stated that the film did not have backstories for the characters, but there is a connection established between them and the audience. He further stated this an interview with The Indian Express, saying "I pay attention to even the trivial characters who contribute to a film. Starting from Narain, Dheena to Hareesh Peradi and Harish Uthaman—everyone's character was important. They were roped in because of their unique voice and dialogue delivery."

Narain played the role of Inspector Bejoy, and was cast after Karthi's persistence to have him in that particular role. He stated that his role in the film is "interesting" and similar to the role he played in Anjathe (2008). George Maryan's character, the constable Napoleon, was considered by Lokesh to be "one of the most honest roles" he had written to that point. Arjun Das was chosen to play the main antagonist Anbu since Lokesh felt he had the powerful voice needed for the character.

=== Filming ===
Principal photography began on 13 December 2018, the day after the film was launched. The first schedule of the film began in Chennai during mid-December and was completed in less than 15 days. The team began the second schedule in Tenkasi on 4 January 2019. Major portions of the film were also shot in the surroundings of Tirunelveli. The storyline takes place primarily in one night, except for the final scene.

Narain faced difficulties while filming some stunt scenes. He claimed that due to one hand being in a sling, running down a steep slope during a scene was "dangerous, and took every ounce of concentration, as I couldn't balance myself properly while running downhill. As it was my first time doing stunts with a sling, it took a lot of skill and judgement to tackle the kicks, fisticuffs and falls in the chase and fight sequences". During another scene, Narain was told to "run out of a verandah, past a swimming pool, and keep running, halting only at a designated spot at a distance". He recalled, "But as I ran past the pool, I tripped on a slippery patch of water on the concrete. With one hand in a sling, I couldn't balance myself to stop the fall and fell down flat, my shoulder and chest taking the brunt of the fall [...] I felt I'd had a narrow escape, since it was hard concrete around the pool", but was left with shoulder pain for four months.

Karthi practised to drive a lorry in one of the sequences. Since he had not driven a lorry before, he felt it was "quite challenging". Lokesh explained about few sequences, particularly the climax scenes, as he stated that "Cinema is all about making the audience believe it is real. So, I didn't mind those couple of larger-than-life fights, towards the climax portions. Every fight had a backstory to it, and wasn't away from the premise. I only wanted my characters to behave and sound authentic." Principal photography wrapped on 9 May 2019. While many sources claimed that the film was shot within 62 days, Lokesh and Karthi themselves stated that they took about 36–45 days for shooting the film.

== Themes and influences ==
Commentators have noted the film's similarities to Assault on Precinct 13 (1976) and Con Air (1997). However, Lokesh in Srivatsan's interview to The Hindu, stated that Die Hard (1988) and Virumaandi (2004), served as additional references for Kaithi. The character Dilli and his looks were also modelled from the titular character played by Kamal Haasan in Virumaandi. Pon Parthiban also admitted in an interview, further stating that audience need to compare the scenes where both characters talk about their wives, and you can sense the spiritual connection they share, whereas Parthiban replied that "The dialogue in Virumaandi is even more beautiful".

The setting of where the entire story takes place in a night, was also referenced from the filmography of directors Martin Scorsese and Quentin Tarantino. Lokesh believed that "movies shot in the dark are underrated and offer so much scope in terms of lighting". He took the hostage scene in Die Hard as an example, where the "darkness made it very atmospheric" and concluded that "In a way, this film was a reverse of that situation, where the bad guys are locked inside a police station that is under siege". For the making of the pre-climax action sequence choreographed by the duo Anbariv, where Karthi had to perform risky stunts on a moving lorry. He cited the stunt sequences of Naan Mahaan Alla (2010) as the benchmark for it.

== Music ==
The original score is composed by Sam C. S. Despite not having any songs in the film, four tracks with vocals have been included in the background score, with a song titled "Neel Iravil" was featured in the film's teaser. In an interview to The Hindu, Sam recalled that Lokesh had hinted musical references from American films, and wanted to incorporate in the film score. He cited The Dark Knight (2008) as an example for one of the themes he had composed.

The score which consisted of a "metal clanging sound" played in the teaser is one of the themes, that was hinted to Dilli's past life during the prison, which will be used as the main theme in the sequel. The original soundtrack which features 17 tracks were released, nearly a month after the film's release, on 22 November 2019. The vocals were written and performed by Sam and Sharanya Gopinath, with the latter rapping a few versions in English. The score received positive response from critics, with Sify calling Sam as "another silent hero of the film" and Kaushik Rajaraman, writing for DT Next, stated that Sam's background score for the film "on a par with his theme music in Vikram Vedha".

Track listing
No.	Title	Length
1.	"Kill and Destroy" (Lyrics and English rap versions performed by Sharanya Gopinath)	3:19
2.	"Dilli's Swag"	0:50
3.	"Grief of Dilli"	3:44
4.	"Rise of Dilli"	1:19
5.	"Nepolean Theme"	2:25
6.	"Nee Eppo Varuva Appa"	1:14
7.	"The Hot Biriyani" (Vocals performed by Sam C. S.)	1:50
8.	"The Battle of Cop and Killer"	1:30
9.	"Kaithi Main Theme"	0:28
10.	"Beginning of the War"	2:11
11.	"The Phase of Deathcall"	0:34
12.	"Eternal Love of Father" (Vocals performed by Sam C. S.)	3:14
13.	"Arrival of the Ruffian"	0:48
14.	"Neel Iravil" (Vocals and lyrics performed by Sam C. S.)	1:21
15.	"The Emotion Hustler"	0:42
16.	"The Maze"	0:58
17.	"Night is Dark" (Vocals performed by Sam C. S, with English rap versions done by Sharanya Gopinath)	1:53
Total length:		28:18

== Release ==
Kaithi was initially scheduled to release during mid-July 2019, but post-production delays meant that the film's release being pushed to 27 September 2019. The release was further postponed to October 2019, before eventually finalising the release during Diwali (27 October 2019). The release eventually coincided with the Vijay-starrer Bigil (2019). A week before the scheduled release, the makers announced the release date as 25 October 2019, ahead of the Diwali festival. The film was cleared by the Central Board of Film Certification (CBFC) in mid-October. It was also dubbed and released in Telugu as Khaidi.

Prior to the scheduled release, the Tamil Nadu government denied permission to conduct early morning shows for the film and Bigil in concern of the increased ticket rates being levied by the exhibitors. Kaithi was released in over 250 screens across Tamil Nadu, despite competition from Bigil. It was also showcased in 1400 screens worldwide, with the film releasing over 330 screens in Andhra Pradesh and Telangana; 75 screens in Kerala, 100 screens across Karnataka, 125 screens across other parts of India, and 400 screens in the overseas centres. Due to the positive reception for the film, the number of shows had been increased from 250 screens in Tamil Nadu to 350 during its second week.

"I see lot of genuine concerns over the 30-day window for films in OTT while running successfully in BO. Theatrical audience will reduce eventually if we continue this trend!? Yes! But, piracy & less terms from third week can be compensated for producers only through this!"

— S. R. Prabhu, on the film's early digital premiere.

Following its successful run, the digital streaming service Hotstar premiered the film on 25 November 2019, a month after its release date. It eventually received criticism from the exhibitors and distributors as the early digital premiere might lead to reducing number of footfalls in theatres. While producer S. R. Prabhu, attributed that the threat of piracy might be the reason for the 30-day window between theatrical and streaming run, many theatre owners opposed this. Major multiplex chains such as PVR, INOX and AGS, stopped its screening, soon after the digital premiere of the film. Irrespective of these factors, the film completed 50-day theatrical run on 13 December 2019.

The satellite rights were brought by Star Vijay. Kaithi was selected for screening at the International Indian Film Festival in Toronto (IIFFT), which was held on 9–15 August 2020. In November 2021, the producers of the film confirmed the theatrical release in Japan, after one of the Japanese distributors piqued interest in showcasing the film in the country. With an initial agreement being signed, the producers announced that the film will be titled as Kaithi Dilli for its release in Japan, and will be screened from 19 November 2021. The film was intended to be released in Russia on 10 March 2022, with a Russian language dub, but eventually released in over 121 theatres at 297 cities in Russia on 19 May 2022.

=== Home media ===
Following its acquisition by Aha, Khaidi (Telugu) premiered exclusively on their platform on 15 February 2020.

== Reception ==
=== Box office ===
In the opening day of its release, the film collected ₹3.5 crore (US$360,000) on first day, despite competing with Bigil. The film collected ₹40 lakh (US$42,000) from the Chennai city box-office on its first day. The film collected around ₹2.8 crore (US$290,000) on second day and about ₹4.7 crore (US$490,000) on third day, adding its estimated collection to ₹11 crore (US$1.1 million) on the first 3-day weekend, with ₹1.07 crore (US$110,000) from Chennai alone. At the end of the first week, the film collected about ₹25 crore (US$2.6 million) at the box-office. International Business Times published that the film had collected ₹70 crore (US$7.3 million) worldwide in the first 10 days, with ₹35 crore (US$3.6 million) from Tamil Nadu, ₹5.5 crore (US$570,000) in Kerala, close to ₹10 crore (US$1.0 million) in Andhra Pradesh and Telangana and over ₹7 crore (US$730,000) in Karnataka. The film further collected ₹13 crore (US$1.3 million) from overseas markets.

Due to the factors of increased screenings, in second week, boosting the film's collections, the film earned ₹83.4 crore (US$13 million) worldwide as of 12 days. On 12 November 2019, the makers officially announced that the film had collected ₹100 crore (US$15.59 million) worldwide, thereby becoming Karthi's first film to cross the 100-crore mark. The film earned ₹56.5 crore (US$5.9 million) from Tamil Nadu, ₹15.1 crore (US$1.6 million) from Andhra Pradesh and Telangana, ₹6.2 crore (US$640,000) from Kerala, ₹7.43 crore (US$770,000) from Karnataka and ₹1.87 crore (US$190,000) from rest of the country. The film's final collection stands at ₹105 crore (US$11 million), with a net collection of ₹74.5 crore (US$7.7 million).

=== Critical response ===
Kaithi received critical acclaim. On the review aggregator website Rotten Tomatoes, 100% of 7 critics' reviews are positive, with an average rating of 7/10. Owing to its critical response, it was featured in many year-end lists as one of the best Tamil films of 2019 by several publications such as The Indian Express, Film Companion South, Hindustan Times, Sify, Firstpost and India Today.

Calling it as a "tense and impressively shot action thriller", M. Suganth gave 4.5 stars (out of 5) in the review for The Times of India, and stated "Lokesh Kanagaraj gives us a pure genre film minus the frills, like songs and romance, that we are used to in Tamil cinema". Though he concerned about "the film which feels overlong for its genre, as a couple of action blocks getting over-indulgent" but concluded "when it is action that we have signed up for, we cannot complain much about that". Janani K of India Today gave four out of five stars stating, "Kaithi is a film that showcases filmmaking at its best" and praised Karthi's performance as "terrific and natural that one could literally picture a prisoner going through a tough time". Sreedhar Pillai of Firstpost gave four-and-a-half out of five stars rating to the film saying "Kaithi is a well made film that takes the road less travelled and provides enough thrills". He further added that "Karthi's raw and intense performance, the film's taut screenplay and excellent technicality, along with awesome action scenes, makes Kaithi an edge-of-the seat thriller".

News18-based critic Gauthaman Bhaskaran gave three out of five stars stating "Karthi's stunning performance makes it an engaging watch". Manoj Kumar R. of The Indian Express gave 3.5 stars (out of 5) stating, "Karthi has essayed his role in an almost self-effacing manner while allowing the space for other people's acts of courage in the narration to get their due screen time. Kaithi is the director's canvas. It is necessary to appreciate Karthi to let Lokesh do his thing without trying to bend the narration to suit his star image. The director softly but firmly announces himself as a major new force in the commercial space of the Tamil film industry, which still largely feeds on the narrow definition of mainstream entertainment." S. Srivatsan, writing for The Hindu, stated the film as "one of the best action thriller ever made since Theeran Adhigaaram Ondru". Further reviewing that "Kaithi does have its 'mass' moments, but there is a certain level of screenwriting that has gone into conceiving those. The plot contains all the elements of a conventional suspense-thriller, but where Kaithi differs is by how Lokesh Kanagaraj treats the genre and its audience with respect." Karthik Kumar of Hindustan Times stated it as "an action film with a soul and a purpose" while also stated that "though it is not a crowd-pleasing commercial film, it still caters to the masses".

Sify gave three-and-a-half out of five stars stating "Kaithi is a solid action thriller and it will be a feast for action lovers". Ashameera Aiyyappan of The New Indian Express stated the film as "a well-made commercial thriller". Calling it as "brilliant" and "engaging thriller", Anupama Subramanian of Deccan Chronicle gave four out of five, saying "Kaithi with its solid story combined with outstanding performances and flawless making is set to stand the test of time". The News Minute-based editor-in-chief, Priyanka Thirumurthy, gave four out of five stating "There is no star in Kaithi, as director Lokesh shows that a hero is anyone who goes beyond thinking about just himself." Baradwaj Rangan wrote for Film Companion, "Kaithi is certainly a sturdy vehicle for Karthi, who – as Theeran Adhigaaram Ondru so memorably demonstrated – is one of our few actors who can do both Clark Kent (through his face) and Superman (through his stocky frame). There's a fantastic "mass" scene, set around a swimming pool, where Dilli stuffs himself with biriyani – it's a stunning few minutes of a purely physical performance. It's strange how this Karthi looks and sounds so genteel and urban in real life, but his best work on screen is when he's got a bit of animal inside him."

== Accolades ==
Award (Note: Awards, festivals and organisations are in Alphabetical order.)	Date of ceremony (Note: Date is linked to the article about the awards held that year, wherever possible.)	Category	Recipient(s) and nominee(s)	Result	Ref.
Ananda Vikatan Cinema Awards	11 January 2020	Best Supporting Actor – Male	George Maryan	Won	
Ananda Vikatan Cinema Awards	11 January 2020	Best Stunt Director	Anbariv	Won	
Critics' Choice Film Awards	14 March 2020	Best Actor – Male	Karthi	Nominated	
Norway Tamil Film Festival Awards	15 January 2020	Best Actor	Karthi	Won	
Norway Tamil Film Festival Awards	15 January 2020	Best Villain	Arjun Das	Won	
Norway Tamil Film Festival Awards	15 January 2020	Best Editor	Philomin Raj	Won	
South Indian International Movie Awards	18 September 2021	Best Film – Tamil	Dream Warrior Pictures	Won	
South Indian International Movie Awards	18 September 2021	Best Director – Tamil	Lokesh Kanagaraj	Nominated	
South Indian International Movie Awards	18 September 2021	Best Actor – Tamil	Karthi	Nominated	
South Indian International Movie Awards	18 September 2021	Best Supporting Actor – Tamil	George Maryan	Won	
South Indian International Movie Awards	18 September 2021	Best Supporting Actor – Tamil	Narain	Nominated	
South Indian International Movie Awards	18 September 2021	Best Actor in a Negative Role – Tamil	Arjun Das	Won	
South Indian International Movie Awards	18 September 2021	Best Actor in a Comedian – Tamil	Dheena	Nominated	
South Indian International Movie Awards	18 September 2021	Best Cinematographer – Tamil	Sathyan Sooryan	Nominated	
Zee Cine Awards Tamil	4 January 2020	Favourite Director	Lokesh Kanagaraj	Won	
Zee Cine Awards Tamil	4 January 2020	Best Stunt Director	Anbariv	Won	
Zee Cine Awards Tamil	4 January 2020	Best Villain	Arjun Das	Won	
Zee Cine Awards Tamil	4 January 2020	Best Supporting Actor – Male	George Maryan	Won	
Tamil Nadu State Film Awards	29 January 2026	Best Actor (Special Prize)	Karthi	Won	

== Impact ==
Kaithi received appreciation from several members of the film fraternity, including Gautham Vasudev Menon heaped praise on the film's trailer saying it as "intense and theatre worthy". Karthik Subbaraj called the film as "kick-ass film with lot of Wow moments through out", while Mahesh Babu, who watched the film, praised Lokesh for the exclusion of songs and technical brilliance, as a "welcome change" for the industry. Cinematographer P. C. Sreeram, who watched the film through Hotstar, called it as "an edge of the seat experience". He further praised Lokesh's direction and Sathyan Sooryan's (an apprentice of Sreeram) work in the film. Lokesh, in an interview with an online portal, stated that Vijay, who signed him for directing Master (2021), during the post-production of Kaithi, had watched the final rushes of the film before its release. He further stated that Vijay appreciated his work in the film and congratulated him before the release.

The film's success made Lokesh a most sought director in Tamil cinema who later worked on several projects of top actors. Arjun Das, who played the main antagonist, Anbu, received praise for his characterisation and performance and his loud bass voice for the character gained him a huge following. Lokesh roped him for Master. Further, Arjun Das' Andhaghaaram, which completed production in 2014 but remained unreleased for more than six years following exhibitors' refusal to distribute the film, citing lack of prominent faces, was presented by director Atlee in 2020, following Arjun Das' popularity after in Kaithi, and released directly through Netflix the same year.

Kaithi's success had trade analysts researching about how commercial films without featuring songs but become hits are a rarity in Tamil cinema. Film producer-cum-analyst G. Dhananjayan examined that "For certain type of films, songs are not required while for others, right inclusion of songs satisfy audience who are looking for entertainment as the key element [...] Directors like Sridhar, K Balachander, Bharathirajaa, Balu Mahendra, Mahendran, Mani Ratnam, Shankar have used songs effectively to communicate their stories and not as commercial elements [...] If such approach is followed by other filmmakers, the necessity of songs in films would be unquestioned".

The film revived the popularity of the song "Jumbalakka", composed by A. R. Rahman from the film En Swasa Kaatre (1999); in a scene from Kaithi where the students play an assortment of songs using a music player in loud volume to distract the prisoners from commandeering instructions to their comrades outside the police station. The song became a trend after the release of the film. The film's screenplay was released as book published by Pesaamozhi Publications in January 2023.

== Future ==
=== Lokesh Cinematic Universe ===
Kaithi serves as the first instalment in the planned Lokesh Cinematic Universe (LCU). In June 2022, Lokesh stated that the film was interlinked with the Kamal Haasan-starrer Vikram (2022). Avinash Ramachandran, writing for Cinema Express stated the possibilities of the connection, within the two films, referring to stash of drugs which had scorpion symbol (shown in Vikram's trailer), and in a scene where, Inspector Bejoy (Narain) while speaking to informer Ajhas Ahmed (Kanna Ravi), questions about "The Ghost", Suriya's undisclosed cameo before the film's release and several speculations. Before Vikram's release, Lokesh asked fans to watch Kaithi before Vikram to understand the context of the film, thereby confirming its connection with the two films.

Narain reprises his role in brief as Inspector Bejoy in Vikram. Additionally, Arjun Das, Harish Uthaman, Hareesh Peradi, Dheena and Baby Monica, reprises their roles in cameo appearances as Anbu, Adaikalam, Stephen Raj, Kamatchi and Amudha, respectively, in the film's mid-credits scene, while Karthi reprised his role in a voice-over. George Maryan reprises his role as Napoleon in Leo (2023) where he is appointed to protect Parthiban (Vijay).

=== Sequels ===
As implied at the end of the film, Lokesh had planned for a sequel, which he confirmed after its release. In an interview with Subha J Rao to Firstpost, Lokesh conveyed his interest on developing the film into a franchise, stating that he had an idea for both prequel as well as sequel, which depends on the recurring schedules of the cast members. In May 2021, the film's producer S. R. Prabhu had confirmed the sequel is in the works. It has been reported that the team had filmed most of the scenes during the shooting of the first part and only 30 days of shooting has been left.

Kaithi 2 is intended to be a prequel for Dilli, focusing on his character. In June 2022, Lokesh, in an interview with Baradwaj Rangan, revealed the backstory of Dilli, saying that he was a kabaddi player, and won several trophies in tournaments conducted when he was in prison. He also hinted in the climax, as Dilli walks with a bag full of trophies. Later, in an interaction with fans through Twitter, he further explained about Anbu's return in Vikram, as he was knocked out and not dead, explained by the stitch marks on his jaw due to the injuries, and this would be further explored in Kaithi 2.

Following the success of Vikram, Lokesh planned to expand the scale of Kaithi 2, with S. R. Prabhu admitting that it would be bigger than the first film. However, the start of production has been delayed as Lokesh intended to resume the project after completing Leo, Coolie, and a film tentatively titled AA23.

== Remakes ==
Kaithi was remade in Hindi as Bholaa (2023). In March 2020, it was speculated that the film will be remade in Kannada, with Shiva Rajkumar playing the lead role but did not came into fruition subsequently. Kaithi was also remade in Malay language, titled Banduan (2025) starring Aaron Aziz.

== Controversies ==
A petition was filed against the producer S. R. Prabhu, by Rajiv Ranjan, a native from Kollam district in Kerala, for lifting his story without his permission. In his statement, he wrote an autobiography after spending years at the Puzhal Central Prison (Chennai) in 2000. He narrated his story to Prabhu in 2007, which he had agreed to use as a film script and paid Rajeev ₹10,000 in advance. When Lokesh made the film, he was shocked to see that it was the same story, which the producer narrated to him and felt cheated, resulting him to file a petition at Kollam High Court, Kerala to stop the works on the sequel and its remake. The court gave verdict in favour of him in July 2021, while also demanded the producer to pay ₹4 crore (US$420,000) as a compensation, for allegedly mimicking his story. This was pointed on a leading news channel, which also led derogatory comments against Lokesh in response to the issue. Following the accusations, Prabhu slammed the channel for the way the issue was reported and claimed that they do not have details pertaining to the case and hence cannot comment on the issue. However, they noted that they are ready to face any legal issues with respect to the controversy, since their records are clean. In mid-February 2022, the Kerala Court dismissed the copyright allegations and stated that the story belongs to Lokesh.
