= Lokesh Kanagaraj =

Indian filmmaker (born 1986)

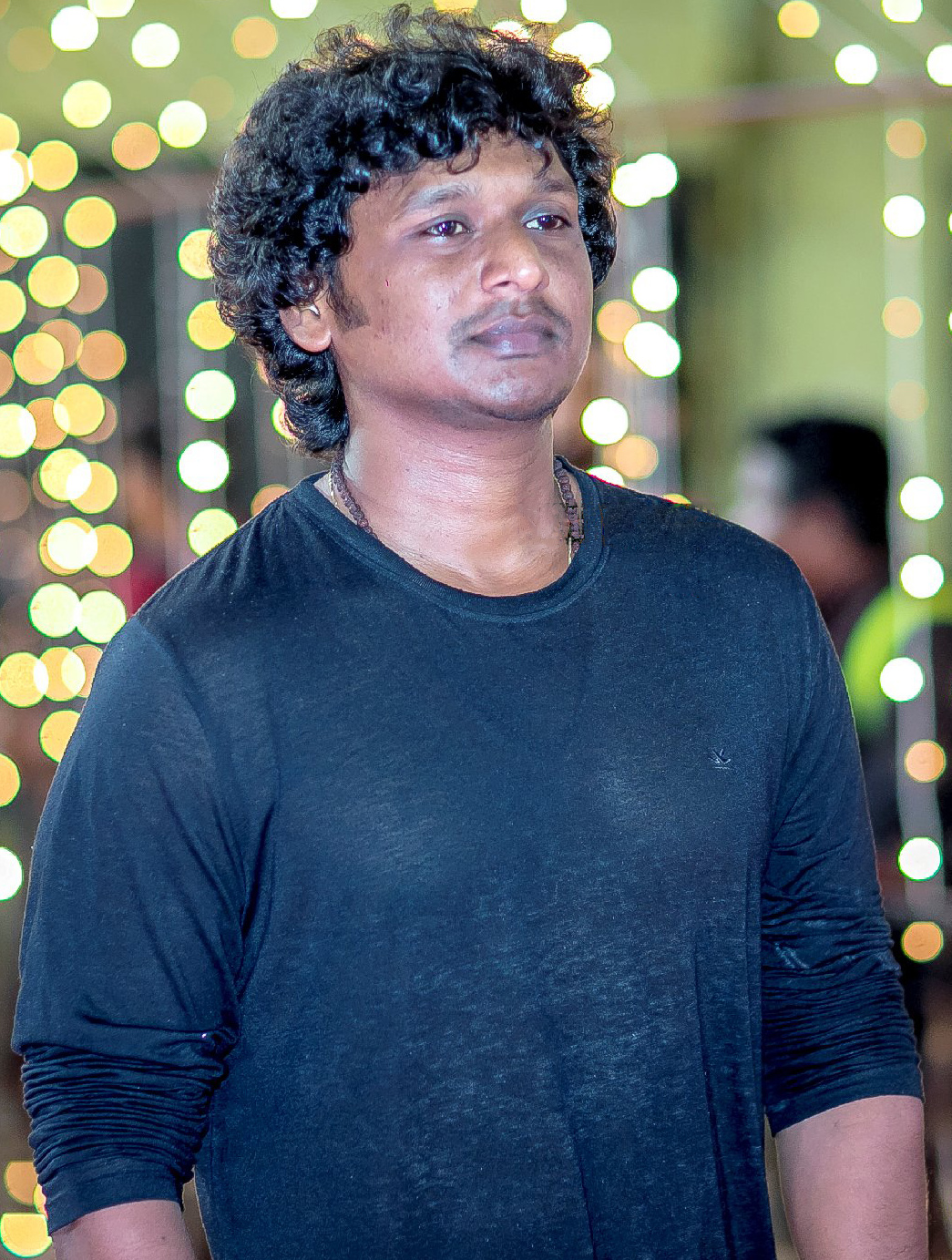
- Lokesh in 2020
- Born: 14 March 1986 (age 40); Kinathukadavu, Coimbatore, Tamil Nadu, India
- Education: PSG College of Arts and Science
- Occupations: Film director; screenwriter; producer, Actor
- Years active: 2015–present
- Known for: Lokesh Cinematic Universe (2019‍–‍present)
- Spouse: Aishwarya (m. 2012)
- Children: 2

Lokesh Kanagaraj (/loʊkeɪʃ kənəɡərɑːdʒ/; born 14 March 1986) is an Indian film director, screenwriter, producer and actor who works primarily in Tamil cinema. He made his directorial debut with Maanagaram (2017) and gained wider recognition with Kaithi (2019), which established the Lokesh Cinematic Universe. He subsequently directed Master (2021), Vikram (2022) and Leo (2023). After making numerous cameo appearances in films, Lokesh made his full-fledged acting debut with the Tamil film DC (2026).

== Early and personal life ==
Lokesh Kanagaraj was born on 14 March 1986 in Kinathukadavu, Coimbatore district of Tamil Nadu, India to a Tamil family. In PSG College of Arts and Science, he majored in Fashion Technology before pursuing an MBA. He did his schooling in Vivek Vidhyalaya Matric Hr. Sec. School Kinathukadavu. He is an ex-bank employee. He pursued his passion towards film making by participating in a corporate short film competition. The judge of the competition was Karthik Subbaraj. Impressed with his short film, he encouraged Lokesh to pursue a directorial career making films.

Lokesh married his longtime partner Aishwarya on 8 January 2012. They have two daughters.

== Career ==
Lokesh made his directorial debut with the short film, Acham Thavir (2012), which won awards for Best Director, Best Film and Best Actor at the Clubace short film festival. In 2016, his short film Kalam was included in the anthology film Aviyal, produced by Karthik Subbaraj. He directed his first feature film, Maanagaram, in 2017, followed by the 2019 action thriller Kaithi produced by Dream Warrior Pictures, with Karthi in the lead role.

Lokesh's next film, Master, released in January 2021 and starring Vijay and Vijay Sethupathi, received positive reviews and became the highest-grossing Indian film of that year.

In 2022, Lokesh directed Vikram, starring Kamal Haasan, Sethupathi and Fahadh Faasil. The film's success, along with the establishment of the Lokesh Cinematic Universe (LCU), elevated his reputation in the industry, leading to another collaboration with Vijay on Leo (2023) served as the third installment in the LCU franchise.

In June 2023, Lokesh announced to conclude his directing career after completing 10 films. Later that year, in December, Lokesh announced a short film within the LCU, titled Chapter Zero, a prequel to Kaithi 2. Lokesh and Shruti Haasan came together for a musical project titled Inimel (2024).

Following the release of Leo, Lokesh announced he would be directing the 171st film of Rajinikanth, Coolie (2025), produced by Sun Pictures and with music composed by Anirudh Ravichander. It marked Lokesh's first collaboration with Rajinikanth and was conceived as a standalone film separate from the LCU. It released worldwide on 14 August 2025 to mixed reviews from both critics and audience alike, with significant box-office collections reported across India and overseas markets.

On 14 January 2026, coinciding with Sankranthi and Pongal, Lokesh announced he would be directing the 23rd film of Allu Arjun, produced by Mythri Movie Makers and with music composed by Anirudh Ravichander.

=== G Squad ===
In November 2023, Lokesh launched his production company, G Squad, and unveiled his first production, Fight Club, directed by Vijay Kumar. On 14 April 2024 coinciding with Puthandu, Lokesh announced his production venture, Benz, directed by Bakkiyaraj Kannan and starring Raghava Lawrence in the lead. He has also written the story for the film. On 30 October 2024, Benz was confirmed to be a part of the LCU. A few weeks later, Lokesh announced Mr Bhaarath, an upcoming Tamil-language romantic comedy, on 18 December 2024, to be produced under his G Squad banner. On 12 December 2025, Rathna Kumar's fourth directorial venture, 29, was announced as a co-production by Lokesh and Karthik Subbaraj under the banners G Squad and Stone Bench.

== Filmmaking style ==
Lokesh's films are primarily in the action genre. He has likened himself to John Woo, who is also known mainly for directing such films. Despite this, Lokesh has expressed interest in exploring other genres such as fantasy and comedy. He has cited action films from the 1980s and 1990s as influences on his films, and has named Martin Scorsese and Quentin Tarantino as some of his favourite directors due to their filmmaking styles. Rathna Kumar, who worked with Lokesh on Master, Vikram, and Leo, mentioned that his penchant for retro songs, violence, and hyperlink narratives in his films comes from his admiration for Tarantino. In response to criticism of his films for seemingly glorifying bloodshed and violence, Lokesh said that while he does try to romanticise violence, he has always had to tone down such sequences in his films to appeal to family audiences. He made an exception with Coolie, saying he made no compromises on the film's violent content, and it subsequently became his first film to receive an A (adults only) certificate. To make his stunt sequences believable, Lokesh avoids using ropes, and believes this limitation makes the sequences look brutal and raw.

== Filmography ==
Year	Title	Credited as			Notes
Year	Title	Director	Producer	Writer	Notes
2016	Aviyal	Yes	No	Yes	Anthology film; Segment: Kalam
2017	Maanagaram	Yes	No	Yes	
2019	Kaithi	Yes	No	Yes	
2021	Master	Yes	No	Yes	Cameo
2022	Vikram	Yes	No	Yes	
2023	Michael	No	Presenter	No	Telugu film; presenter for the Tamil-dubbed version
2023	Leo	Yes	No	Yes	
2023	Fight Club	No	Presenter	No	
2025	Coolie	Yes	No	Yes	
2026	29	No	Yes	No	
2026	Mr. Bhaarath †	No	Yes	No	
TBA	Benz †	No	Yes	Yes	Uncredited as screenplay writer
TBA	AA23 †	Yes	No	Yes	

=== Acting credits ===
Year	Title	Role	Notes	Ref.
2021	Master	Prisoner	Cameo appearances	
2024	Singapore Saloon	Himself	Cameo appearances	
2024	Inimel	Himself	Music video co-starring Shruti Haasan, who also sang the song.	
2026	Kattalan	Leo Cabral	Cameo appearance; Malayalam film	
2026	Jana Nayagan	Reporter	Cameo appearance	
2026	DC	Devadas	Debut as a lead	

=== Television ===
Year	Title	Writer	Ref.
2018	Vella Raja	Story	

== Recurring collaborations ==
List of Lokesh Kanagaraj recurring collaborations
Film	Philomin Raj	Sathyan Sooryan	Girish Gangadharan	N. Sathees Kumar	Anbariv	Arjun Das	Arun Alexander	Anirudh Ravichander	Dheena	Rathna Kumar
Maanagaram (2017)	check			check			check			
Kaithi (2019)	check	check		check	check	check	check		check	
Master (2021)	check	check		check	check	check	check	check	check	check
Vikram (2022)	check		check	check	check	check		check	check	check
Leo (2023)	check			check	check			check		check
Coolie (2025)	check		check	check	check			check		

== Accolades ==
List of Lokesh Kanagaraj awards
Ceremony	Award Name	Movie	Status	Ref.
10th Vijay Awards	Best Debut Director	Maanagaram	Won	
Zee Cine Awards Tamil - 2020	Favourite Director	Kaithi	Won	
10th South Indian International Movie Awards	Best Director – Tamil	Master	Won	
South Indian International Movie Awards	Best Director – Tamil	Vikram	Won	
