= Anbariv =

Indian action choreographer, stunt coordinator duo

- Born: 11 May 1984 (age 42); Chennai, Tamil Nadu, India
- Occupations: Action choreographer; stunt co-ordinator
- Years active: 2010–present

Anbumani and Arivumani, jointly known as Anbariv, are an Indian duo of twin brothers, who are action choreographers and stunt coordinators in Tamil, Telugu, Malayalam, Kannada, and Hindi cinema.

The duo are well known for their action sequences in films such as Madras (2014), Kabali (2016), Kaithi (2019), Vikram (2022), Leo (2023), RDX (2023), Salaar: Part 1 – Ceasefire (2023) and Amaran (2024).

Anbariv won the National Film Award for Best Stunt Choreography in KGF: Chapter 1 (2018) and KGF: Chapter 2 (2022).

== Early life ==
Anbumani, also known as Anbu, and Arivumani or Arivu, were born as twins and were raised up in Pulhal. They did schooling in Avichi Higher Secondary School in Saligramam, Chennai. They were known to be very silent in classes.

== Career ==
It was Anbu who joined the film industry initially before his twin brother Arivu. Both of them initially served as training assistants to some of the leading stunt masters in the Indian film industry including Stun Siva, Peter Hein, Vijayan, Kecha Khamphakdee, Silva and Dinesh Subbarayan.

The duo debuted in Kollywood as assistant stunt directors in the 2010 film Naan Mahaan Alla before becoming prominent full fledged stunt choreographers in Indian cinema.

In 2018, the duo was suspended from the South Indian Cine and TV Stunt Artistes Union for allegations on violating the union rules and code of ethics regarding the stunt sequences and action performances. The court granted relief to the duo and allowed to rejoin the union.

The duo will be making their directorial debut with Kamal Haasan's 237th film tentatively titled KH237.

== Filmography ==
Key
†	Denotes films that have not yet been released

Year	Film	Language	Notes	Ref.
2010	Naan Mahaan Alla	Tamil		
2012	Bachelor Party	Malayalam		
2012	Da Thadiya	Malayalam		
2013	Kili Poyi			
2013	Honey Bee			
2013	Sringaravelan			
2013	Idharkuthane Aasaipattai Balakumara	Tamil		
2014	Peruchazhi	Malayalam	Climax fight only	
2014	Madras	Tamil		
2015	Bhaskar the Rascal	Malayalam		
2015	Amar Akbar Anthony	Malayalam		
2015	Maya	Tamil		
2016	Gethu	Tamil		
2016	King Liar	Malayalam		
2016	24	Tamil		
2016	Kabali	Tamil		
2016	Iru Mugan	Tamil		
2016	Welcome to Central Jail	Malayalam		
2016	Kaashmora	Tamil		
2017	Si:3	Tamil		
2017	Maanagaram	Tamil		
2017	Georgettan's Pooram	Malayalam		
2017	Sathriyan	Tamil		
2017	Kootathil Oruthan	Tamil		
2017	Ramaleela	Malayalam		
2017	Solo	Malayalam; Tamil		
2017	Nenjil Thunivirundhal	Tamil		
2018	Touch Chesi Chudu	Telugu		
2018	Kammara Sambhavam	Malayalam		
2018	Mercury	Tamil		
2018	Junga	Tamil		
2018	NOTA	Tamil		
2018	Sandakozhi 2	Tamil	Interval fight only	
2018	Thuppaki Munai	Tamil		
2018	K.G.F: Chapter 1	Kannada	National Film Award for Best Stunt Choreography	
2019	Dev	Tamil		
2019	Thadam	Tamil		
2019	118	Telugu		
2019	Kee	Tamil		
2019	Mr. Local	Tamil		
2019	Kaithi	Tamil		
2019	Action	Tamil		
2019	Ruler	Telugu		
2020	Aswathama	Telugu		
2021	Roberrt	Kannada		
2021	Mumbai Saga	Hindi		
2021	Yuvarathnaa	Kannada		
2021	Radhe	Hindi		
2021	Sarpatta Parambarai	Tamil		
2021	Doctor	Tamil		
2021	Jai Bhim	Tamil		
2021	Pon Manickavel	Tamil		
2021	Lakshya	Telugu		
2022	Kombu Vatcha Singamda	Tamil		
2022	Theal	Tamil		
2022	Khiladi	Telugu		
2022	Etharkkum Thunindhavan	Tamil		
2022	Beast	Tamil		
2022	K.G.F: Chapter 2	Kannada	National Film Award for Best Stunt Choreography	
2022	Vikram	Tamil		
2022	Ramarao on Duty	Telugu		
2022	Gatta Kusthi	Tamil		
2023	Dasara	Telugu		
2023	Kisi Ka Bhai Kisi Ki Jaan	Hindi		
2023	RDX: Robert Dony Xavier	Malayalam		
2023	Leo	Tamil		
2023	Bandra	Malayalam		
2023	Salaar: Part 1 - Ceasefire	Telugu		
2024	Ayalaan	Tamil		
2024	Kalki 2898 AD	Telugu		
2024	Indian 2	Tamil		
2024	Vettaiyan	Tamil		
2024	Amaran	Tamil	Ananda Vikatan Cinema Award for Best Stunt Director	
2024	Baby John	Hindi		
2025	Game Changer	Telugu		
2025	Thug Life	Tamil		
2025	Coolie	Tamil		
2026	Karuppu	Tamil		
2026	Toxic	Kannada English	Bilingual film	
2026	I'm Game	Malayalam		
TBA	KH 237 †	Tamil	also directors	
