= Leo (2023 Indian film) =

2023 Indian film by Lokesh Kanagaraj

- Theatrical release poster
- Directed by: Lokesh Kanagaraj
- Written by: Lokesh Kanagaraj; Rathna Kumar; Deeraj Vaidy
- Produced by: S. S. Lalit Kumar; Jagadish Palanisamy
- Starring: Vijay; Sanjay Dutt; Arjun; Trisha
- Cinematography: Manoj Paramahamsa
- Edited by: Philomin Raj
- Music by: Anirudh Ravichander
- Production company: Seven Screen Studio
- Distributed by: see below
- Release date: 19 October 2023
- Running time: 164 minutes
- Country: India
- Language: Tamil
- Budget: ₹250–400 crore
- Box office: est. ₹598–615 crore

Leo (also marketed as Leo: Bloody Sweet) is a 2023 Indian Tamil-language action thriller film directed by Lokesh Kanagaraj. Produced by Seven Screen Studio, it is the third instalment in the Lokesh Cinematic Universe. Partially inspired by the David Cronenberg film A History of Violence, Leo stars Vijay in the titular role, alongside Sanjay Dutt, Arjun, Trisha, Gautham Vasudev Menon, Mysskin, Madonna Sebastian, George Maryan, Mansoor Ali Khan, Priya Anand and Mathew Thomas. In the film, Parthiban, an outwardly humble man, draws the attention of gangsters Antony and Harold Das who insist he is Antony's long-lost son, Leo Das.

The film was officially announced in January 2023 under the tentative title Thalapathy 67, as it is Vijay's 67th film as a lead actor, and the official title was announced a few days later. Principal photography commenced the same month in Chennai along with a sporadic schedule in Kashmir, which was again followed by another schedule held at the former location, and wrapped by mid-July. The film has music composed by Anirudh Ravichander, cinematography handled by Manoj Paramahamsa and editing by Philomin Raj.

Leo was released worldwide on 19 October 2023 in standard and IMAX formats to mixed-to-positive reviews from critics, with praise for Vijay's performance, technical aspects and action sequences while the writing received criticism. It set several box office records for a Tamil film, emerging as the second highest-grossing Tamil film of 2023, the seventh highest-grossing Indian film of 2023, third highest-grossing Tamil film of all time, the highest-grossing Tamil film overseas and the highest-grossing film in Tamil Nadu.

== Plot ==
Parthiban "Parthi" is an outwardly humble wildlife rescuer and café proprietor living with his wife Sathya, son Siddharth "Siddhu" and daughter Mathi "Chintu" in Theog, Himachal Pradesh. One day, his forest ranger friend Joshy Andrews seeks his help in taming a spotted hyena; Parthi and Siddhu tame and adopt the hyena subsequently, but chooses to avoid media coverage. Meanwhile, a group of burglars lead by Shanmugham threaten the townsfolk and intrude Parthi's café at its closing time. When they intimidate Parthi with the lives of Chintu and his employee Shruthi, he shoots them dead. Parthi is arrested, but acquitted after the killings are concluded to be in self-defense.

After surviving an assassination attempt by Shanmugham's brother-in-law, Parthi appeals for a Tamil-speaking police officer to protect him and his family. Napoleon, who has been promoted due to his heroics in Tiruchirappalli, (Note: As depicted in Kaithi (2019).) is assigned that position. Meanwhile, owing to the incident, Parthi begins appearing in newspapers nationwide and draw the attention of Telangana-based drug baron brothers Harold and Antony Das. Antony promptly leaves for Theog, having recognised Parthi to be his presumed-dead son Leo; Parthi fiercely denies his claims.

Disbelieving Parthi, Antony meets Sathya and tells her that Parthi is his son Leo, an infamous criminal. Suspicious, Sathya and Joshy separately investigate Parthi's past. While Sathya meets Parthi's childhood friend, Joshy meets Leo's friend Hridayaraj D'Souza, a soon-to-be-executed convict, who narrates Leo's alleged past. (Note: The director has implied that the flashback scenes narrated by Hridayaraj may not be entirely true, making him an unreliable narrator. He said a dialogue mentioning this as the character's perspective had been recorded but ultimately excluded from the final cut as it would give away the plot twist.)

In 1999, after Harold returned to India upon completing his education in Canada, he begins manufacturing and selling a stimulant drug named Datura, using Antony's failing tobacco factory Das & Co as a front. Antony's twin children Leo and Elisa assist the brothers in their activities. Antony, a staunch believer of occult practices, engages in human sacrifices to succour their business. During a celebration, an occult priest tells Antony sacrificing one of his children will grant him enormous success; he offers Elisa and urges Leo to cooperate, but Leo strongly resists and fights Antony and Harold. Although Leo manages to burn the drugs in the struggle, he fails to protect Elisa from getting killed by Harold. She pleads with him to abandon the business and lead a peaceful life, before dying. Leo is then shot by Antony and is presumed dead since.

Hearing this, Joshy is convinced that Parthi is not Leo, while Sathya, too, is similarly convinced. Parthi discerns that Sathya is suspecting his identity and confronts her but they eventually reconcile. Antony informs Parthi that he has kidnapped Siddhu and that he is going to be sacrificed. Parthi and Napoleon pursue Antony and his men; Parthi successfully subdues them and kills Antony but does not find Siddhu, who had been captured by Harold at Das & Co.

After Harold agrees to return Siddhu in exchange for Antony's corpse, Parthi takes the latter alone to Das & Co, but realises that Harold has double-crossed him by sending his men to murder Sathya and Chintu. While Joshy, Napoleon and the hyena protect Sathya and Chintu from the henchmen, Parthi fights Harold and subsequently holds him at gunpoint. Harold finally agrees that Parthi is not Leo and assures no harm to him and his family. However, Parthi laughs loudly and confirms he is Leo before shooting Harold dead and rescuing Siddhu. While torching Das & Co, Parthi asserts that he has done nothing good as Leo, and that anyone who knows his identity must die or already be dead, recalling that he admitted the truth to Antony before killing him.

Back in Theog, Parthi is called by an anonymous person (Note: Implied offscreen as Agent Vikram from Vikram (2022).), who tells him he knows he is Leo and contends that destroying his family's factory will not make society drug-free, imploring him to join his mission and correctly surmises that Parthi, who responds in exasperation, might have recognised him by now.

== Cast ==
- Vijay as Parthiban "Parthi" / Leo Das
- Sanjay Dutt as Antony Das (Voice dubbed by Pudipeddi Ravi Shankar)
- Arjun as Harold Das
- Trisha as Sathya (Voice dubbed by Chinmayi)
- Gautham Vasudev Menon as Joshy Andrews
- George Maryan as Napoleon
- Mysskin as Shanmugam
- Madonna Sebastian as Elisa Das (Voice dubbed by Smruthi K)
- Mansoor Ali Khan as Hridayaraj D'Souza
- Sandy as a robber in Shanmugam's gang
- Priya Anand as Priya Joshy
- Mathew Thomas as Siddharth "Siddhu"
- Babu Antony as Shekhar, Antony's henchman
- Janany Kunaseelan as Shruthi
- Iyal as Mathi "Chintu"
- Mukhtar Khan as Bhawar Jetha, a police officer
- Ramakrishnan as Gabby, Leo's friend
- Denzil Smith as the Magistrate
- Dinesh Master as Dinesh
- Madhusudhan Rao as Shanmugam's brother-in-law
- Vaiyapuri as an occult priest
- Punya Elizabeth as Sathya's friend
- Thavasi as Harold's henchman
- Jawahar as a Veterinary Doctor
- Maneksha as Jailer
- Sachin Mani as Shruthi's husband
- Shanthi as Shanmugam's wife
- Santhi Mayadevi as Parthiban's advocate
- Muthu Krishnan as Press Cameraman
- Pooja Fiya as Press Reporter
- Leela Samson as a public prosecutor
- Dinesh Lamba as the Divisional Forest Officer
- Anurag Kashyap as Daniel (cameo appearance)
- Maya S. Krishnan as Vikram's aide (cameo appearance)
- Kamal Haasan as Vikram (voice only)

== Production ==
=== Development ===
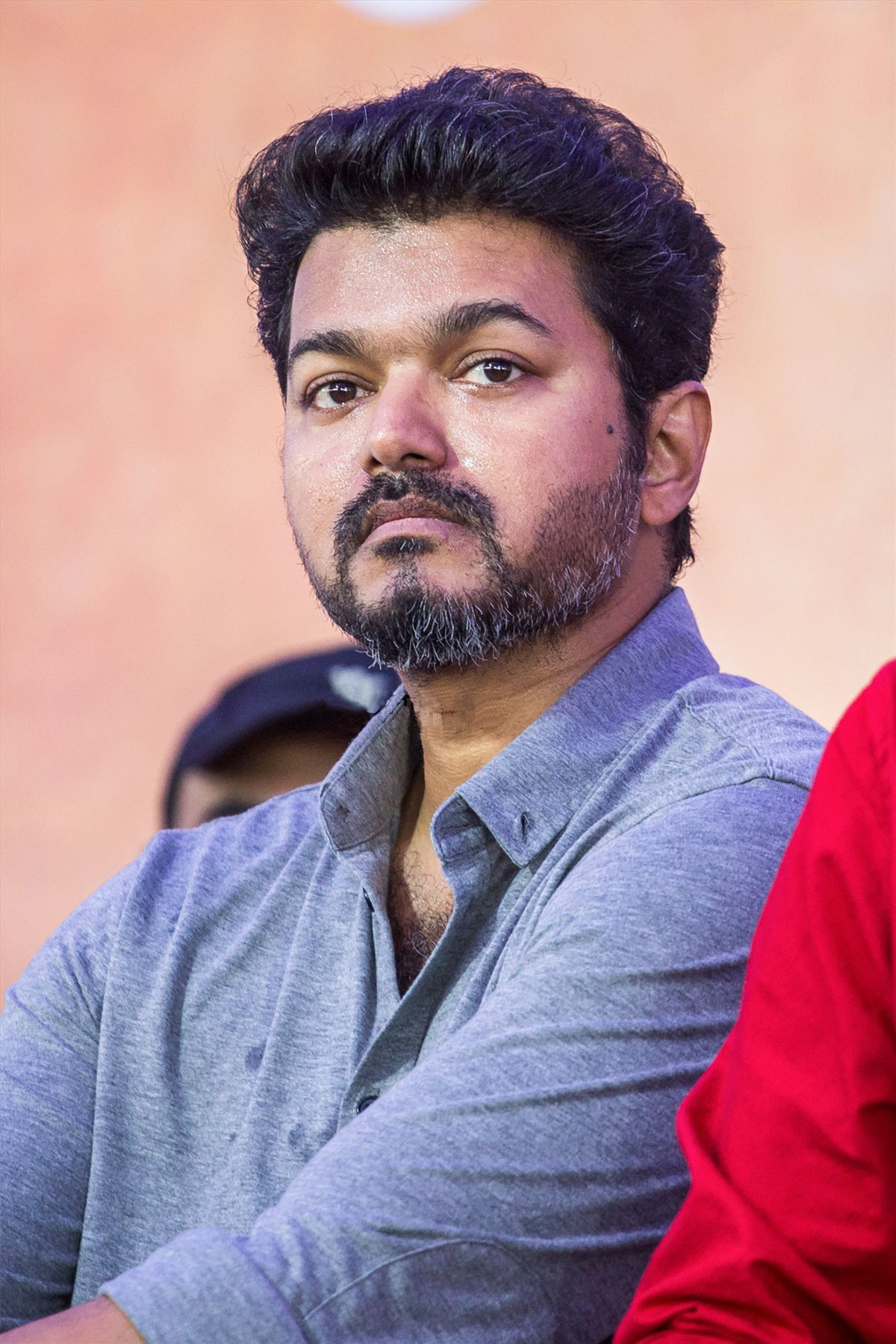
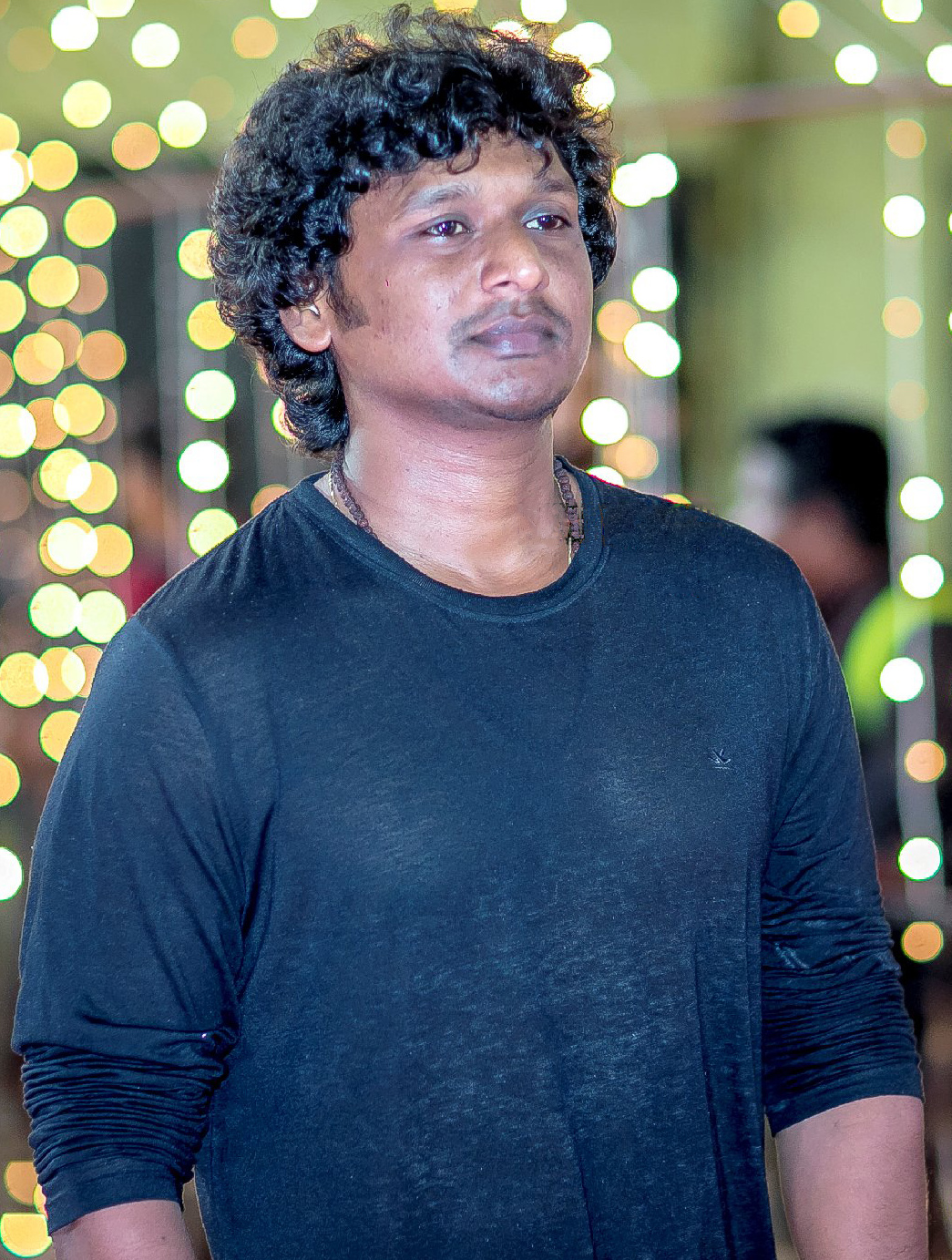
Leo is the second collaboration of Vijay with Lokesh Kanagaraj after Master (2021).

After the success of Master in early 2021, it was reported that Lokesh Kanagaraj visited Vijay at his residence and narrated a script which impressed him. The project was supposed to be the actor's 66th film as a leading actor; however, that position instead went to Varisu (2023). Reports of a potential collaboration between Lokesh and Vijay continued through February 2022. The following March, Lokesh confirmed there were discussions for him to direct Vijay's 67th film. That May, he confirmed the project, tentatively titled Thalapathy 67. The project was funded by S. S. Lalit Kumar's Seven Screen Studio, which had distributed and co-produced Master. Vijay's manager, Jagadish Palanisamy, served as a co-producer. The company made a public announcement on 30 January 2023, confirming the project, and the film's official title Leo was revealed on 3 February 2023. Lokesh revealed that Leo was inspired by the 2005 film A History of Violence by David Cronenberg. According to Lokesh, "It inspired me to write Leo. A History of Violence left its mark on me and from that this movie was born. Leo is my tribute".

The film was made on an estimated budget of upto ₹300–400 crore, and Vijay was reported to receive ₹120 crore (US$13 million) as his remuneration. However, he reportedly decided to take the revenue sharing model, to benefit the film's production; as per the basis, he would receive ₹50 crore (US$5.3 million) as an advance, and a chunk of the profits would be received as the actor's remuneration. Vijay was not in favour of making Leo a pan-Indian film, as he wanted to focus on satisfying the Tamil audience. The actor, however, changed his mind after Lalit and Jagadish convinced him. Some changes were also made to the original story to help the film cater to a wider audience. In August 2023, the film was reported to be a part of the Lokesh Cinematic Universe (LCU), as the makers had signed a no-objection certificate with Dream Warrior Pictures and Raaj Kamal Films International, the producers of the LCU's previous instalments Kaithi (2019) and Vikram (2022) respectively. The film's status in the LCU was not confirmed until its release.

=== Pre-production ===
It took Lokesh nearly six months for the writing and pre-production. Lokesh co-wrote the film's script along with Rathna Kumar, in his third consecutive collaboration with the director, and Deeraj Vaidy, director of Jil Jung Juk (2016). Both of them joined the writing team in mid-August 2022. Lokesh said the film would be completely made in his style, unlike Master which he considered a 50% Vijay film and 50% his film. A muhurat puja was held on 5 December 2022 at AVM Studios in Chennai with the film's cast and crew. On 7 December, the team shot the promotional video for the film for nearly three days.

In mid-January 2023, Manoj Paramahamsa was announced as cinematographer, marking his first collaboration with Lokesh and third with Vijay after Nanban (2012) and Beast (2022). Anirudh Ravichander would score the music, in his third consecutive film with the director. Lokesh further retained most of his norm technicians including editor Philomin Raj, stunt choreography duo Anbariv, dance choreographer Dinesh and art director N. Sathees Kumar. Praveen Raja would style the costumes for Vijay, along with his regular costume designers Pallavi Singh and Eka Lakhani. Ramkumar Balasubramanian was appointed as executive producer of the film by the production house.

=== Casting ===
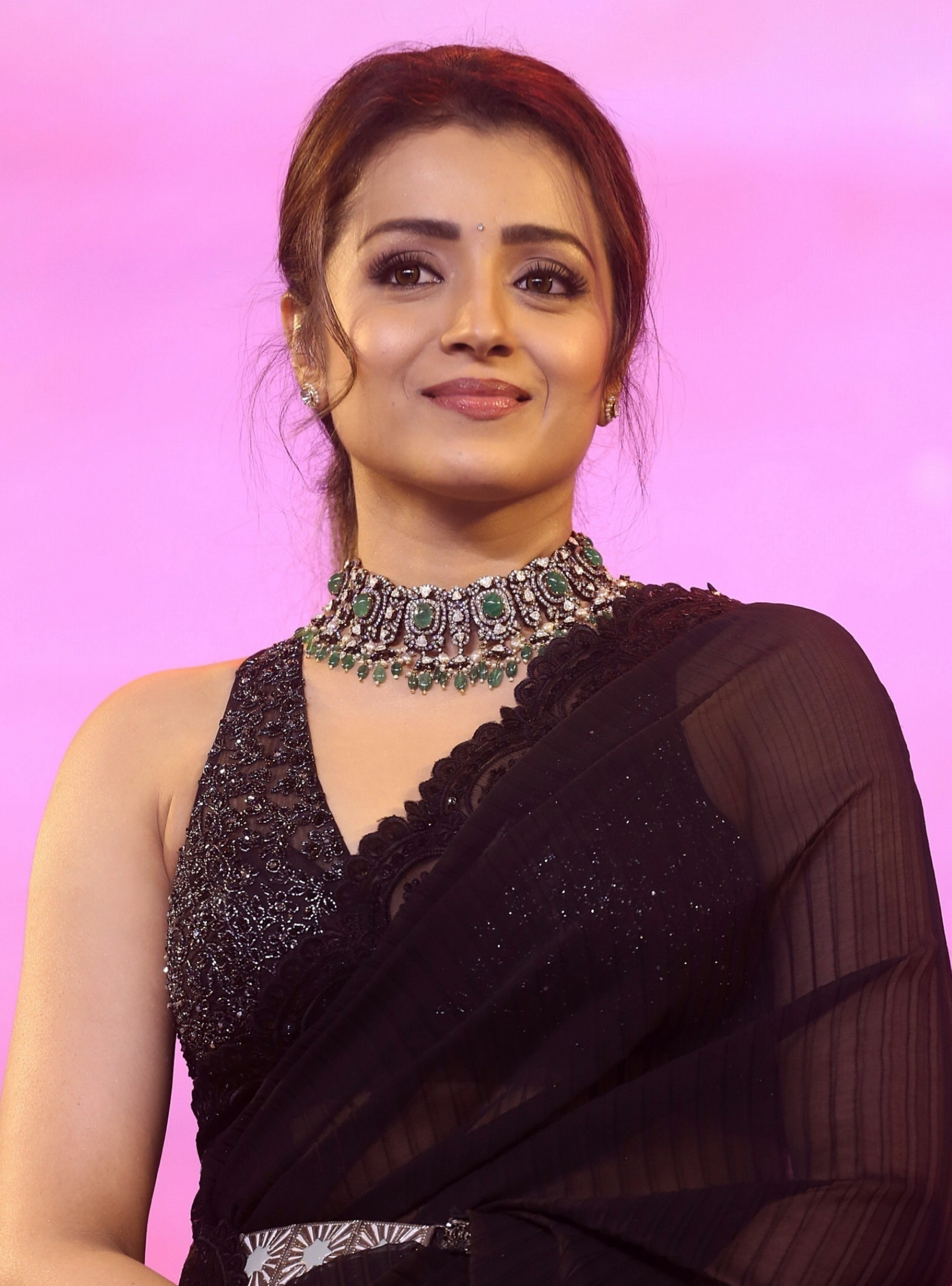
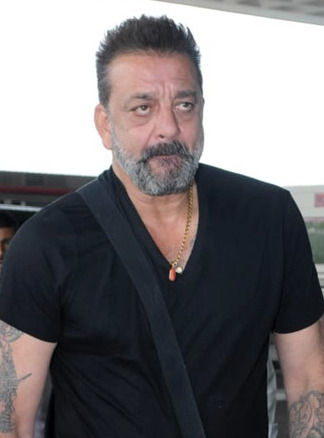
Trisha was cast as the female lead, reuniting with Vijay 14 years since their last release, Kuruvi (2008). Sanjay Dutt would make his Tamil debut with this film.

Vijay would sport a grey-shaded hairstyle for his character, which was finalised after 30 different looks. Trisha was cast as the female lead, pairing opposite Vijay for the fifth time after Ghilli (2004), Thirupaachi (2005), Aathi (2006) and Kuruvi (2008). Sanjay Dutt was confirmed to play one of the main antagonists, in his Tamil film debut and second South Indian film after KGF: Chapter 2 (2022). Dutt agreed to be a part of the project, after being impressed by the one-line narrated for the film. Priya Anand also joined the film in an important role, while Arjun was also cast in an important role. He called it a "different" and "fresh" one that would justify his title "Action King". Lokesh initially wanted Prithviraj Sukumaran to play this role as he was impressed with the actor's performance in Mumbai Police, Ayyappanum Koshiyum and Lucifer, but he declined due to scheduling conflicts.

Madonna Sebastian, Mysskin, Sandy Master, Gautham Vasudev Menon, and Mansoor Ali Khan would play prominent roles. Mathew Thomas, would also make his Tamil debut with the film. All of their inclusion was confirmed by the production house in late-January 2023. Manobala and Janany Kunaseelan were present at the film's preliminary shooting, confirming their presence in the film; the latter would make her acting debut in a feature with this film. George Maryan was also featured in the muhurat puja, thereby confirming his inclusion. Abhirami Venkatachalam and Babu Antony were also confirmed after participating in the film's Jammu and Kashmir schedule. Manobala died on 3 May 2023 without having shot any scenes. George Maryan reprises his role from Kaithi, while Maya S. Krishnan and Kamal Haasan briefly reprise their roles from Vikram, the latter has a voice only role.

=== Filming ===
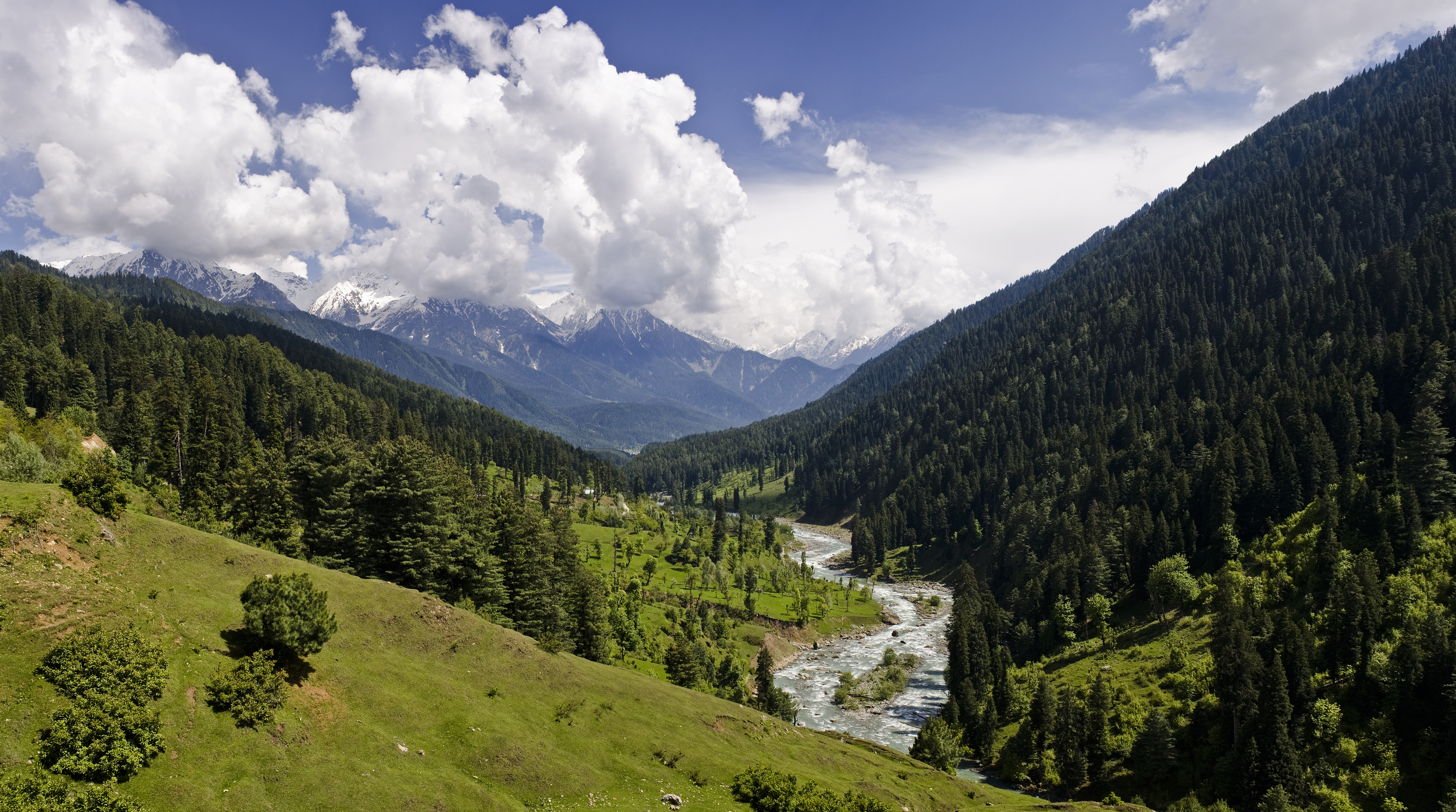
Leo was mainly filmed in Jammu and Kashmir.

Principal photography began with the first schedule on 2 January 2023 at EVP Film City in Chennai. Minor portions of the film were held at Kodaikanal in the last week of January and Mysskin shot for some of his portions there as he could not allocate dates to travel to Jammu and Kashmir, where the subsequent schedule would take place. The second schedule commenced in Kashmir on 1 February. During this schedule, footage of Vijay was leaked and went viral, prompting the film's official technology security partner to warn people against sharing leaked content or they would be deleted. Furthermore, most of the cast and crew members were prohibited from using mobile phones on the sets, to prevent leakage of stills and videos from the shoot. On 27 February, Mysskin tweeted that he had completed filming his portions for the film, which included an intense stunt sequence. In early March, Menon announced that he had completed filming his portions. Scenes related to the protagonist's café were shot in Sifar Café, Anantnag.

Manoj Paramahamsa brought an IMAX-certified RED V-Raptor 8K camera to shoot significant portions, a first for a Tamil film. On 11 March, Dutt started filming for his portions in the Kashmir schedule, and completed them within six days. Filming was halted on 21 March due to a minor earthquake in the location, but resumed soon after. Vijay shot a fight scene with only a simple, thin shirt and had to roll on ice, despite the temperature being −20 °C (−4 °F). A sequence involving him shirtless was also filmed. The Kashmir schedule ended on 23 March. The studio shared a behind-the-scenes video of the Jammu and Kashmir schedule that day as a tribute to the crew of Leo, who worked behind-the-scenes in −5 – −6 °C (23–21 °F). The director thanked every person from the crew for making the Jammu and Kashmir schedule happen. The team shot at Dal Lake, Hazratbal Shrine, Sonamarg, Pahalgam and Srinagar in this schedule.

The third schedule was intended to begin on 29 March at Chennai, but commenced on 5 April. A set was erected for this schedule which led to the postponement. Vijay, along with Dutt, Trisha, Arjun and Priya Anand joined the concurrent schedule, which was reported to go on for 17 days. Some action scenes were shot with a Mocobot camera. Trisha, Dutt and Arjun would begin filming from May. Lokesh also planned to shoot the introductory song sequence featuring at least 2000 background artists. The song was shot in early June in Chennai with 500 background artists. The makers spent ₹7 crore (US$750,000) for shooting the song for 7 days. Paramahamsa purchased a Komodo-X camera to shoot the action sequences in high resolution, thus becoming the first Indian film to be shot using this camera. In late-June, production moved to Talakona. The final schedule was shot in Hyderabad and the climax portion in Ramoji Film City. Vijay had completed shooting for his portions by 10 July. Principal photography wrapped by 14 July, with filming having lasted 125 working days. A month later, the team returned to Jammu and Kashmir for patchwork filming.

=== Post-production ===
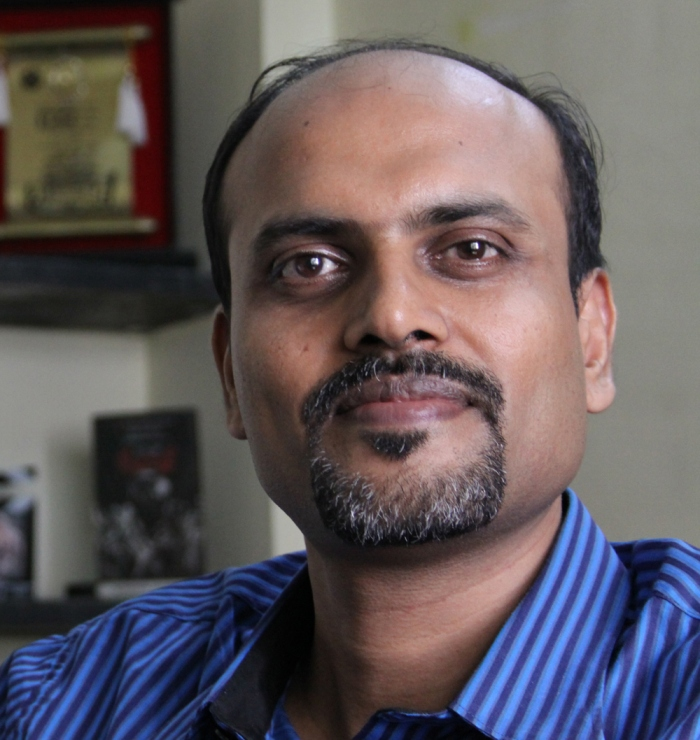
V. Srinivas Mohan is one of the visual effects supervisors of Leo.

In February 2023, The Times of India reported that the film would be having an "extended post-production time" due to Lokesh not wanting to compromise on the CGI. Monesh H. and V. Srinivas Mohan are the visual effects supervisors, while the Moving Picture Company, Al Zhara VFX and SkyHigh VFX are the film's principal visual effects studios. The film's digital intermediate and colour grading works began in late August 2023. Chinmayi dubbed for Trisha for the Tamil, Telugu and Kannada versions of the film. The hyena featured in the film was created through visual effects, and the action sequence featuring the hyena cost ₹15 crore (US$1.6 million).

== Music ==
The soundtrack is composed by Anirudh Ravichander, in his fourth collaboration with Vijay after Kaththi (2014), Master (2021), and Beast (2022); and third collaboration with Lokesh after Master and Vikram. The music rights were purchased by Sony Music India for ₹16 crore (US$1.7 million). The audio launch was to be held on 30 September 2023 at the Nehru Stadium, but was later cancelled on 27 September 2023 due to incessant requests for passes in addition to safety constraints. "Naa Ready" emerged Spotify's most-streamed Tamil track of 2023, as per Spotify Wrapped 2023. "Thaamara Poovukkum" from Pasumpon (1995) was used in the film as a bit song during the coffee shop fight sequence.

== Marketing ==
On 16 September 2023, at the 11th South Indian International Movie Awards, Lokesh announced that updates for the film would be released the following day.

The film's teaser trailer was released on 3 February 2023, revealing the film's title. The first look poster was released on 22 June, and became the most liked first look for an Indian movie in 24 hours on Twitter. The Telugu poster which released on 17 September, became the fastest poster of an Indian film to reach 1 million likes on Instagram in 32 minutes. The film's trailer, gained 1 million likes in 21 minutes, 2 million likes in 7 hours, and over 3.7 million likes in 24 hours, becoming the fastest film trailer to achieve the feat.

On 20 September, the packaged drinking water company Bisleri partnered with the filmmakers to release limited-edition water bottles featuring the film's coin logo. These limited-edition bottles were made available in 500ml, 1-litre, and 2-litre SKUs to consumers across Tamil Nadu and Kerala.

== Release ==
=== Theatrical ===
Leo was theatrically released on 19 October 2023 in standard and IMAX formats. Apart from its original Tamil language, it was also released in the Telugu, Kannada, and Hindi languages. The Telugu version's release was initially stalled due to a dispute over the title "Leo", which Naga Vamsi of Sithara Entertainments claimed to have already registered; however, the issue was later resolved amicably.

In the United Kingdom, as with the rest of the world, the film was initially released on the same day; however, in a version which was classified 15 by the British Board of Film Classification (BBFC) for strong bloody violence, gore, threat, and sexual threat, following 2 minutes and 40 seconds of cuts.

The Hindi-language version of the film, which was also released at this same point in time, was released uncut with an 18 classification by the BBFC for strong bloody violence, with the original Tamil-language version of the film subsequently getting the same classification and reasoning on 30 October 2023, and being released four days later on 3 November 2023, with the marketing for this version of the film clearly denoting its uncut status.

Leo was the first film of Vijay to be released in the IMAX format in the UK. It was the first Tamil film to release in Bangladesh on the same day as its worldwide release, just like in other major countries. Leo was the first film to be released in over 999 locations and premiered on 18 October 2023. It was reported that at least three versions of the film—distinct in differences in scene placement and editing for the reveal that Parthiban and Leo are the same man—existed in theatres.

=== Distribution ===
Sree Gokulam Movies acquired the distribution rights of the film in Kerala for ₹15 crore (equivalent to ₹16 crore or US$1.7 million in 2026). Sithara Entertainments brought the distribution rights for Andhra Pradesh and Telangana. Phars Films acquired the overseas distribution rights and released the film themselves in the Middle East. Ahimsa Entertainment acquired the distribution rights for the UK and 4 Seasons Creations for the rest of Europe, Prathyangira Cinemas and AA Creations for North America, Malik Streams for Malaysia.

=== Pre-bookings ===
Pre-bookings started in the UK on 7 September 2023, six weeks before the film's release. Over 10,000 tickets were sold on the first day of pre-bookings with a collection of £100,000 (US$136,986.3). Pre-bookings started in the United States on 27 September 2023, three weeks before the film's release. After the trailer was released, the premiere bookings for the film in the US crossed over US$500,000 (equivalent to $528,342 in 2025). 32,500 tickets were sold for the film's premiere in the UK for ₹2.5 crore (equivalent to ₹2.7 crore or US$290,000 in 2026), thus holding the record for the highest Day 1 collection in the UK for a Tamil film. Day 1 bookings in the UK crossed £320,000 (US$438,356.16) 13 days before the film's release, thus holding the record for the highest Day 1 collection in the UK for an Indian film surpassing Pathaan.

=== Home media ===
According to Indian trade sources, Leo was set to become the first Tamil film to achieve a pre-release recovery of ₹422 crore (US$45 million) with the sale of satellite, digital, music, and theatrical rights, out of which, ₹246 crore (US$26 million) has been earned from the film's non-theatrical rights.

The digital streaming rights were acquired by Netflix. The film premiered on Netflix on 24 November 2023 in India and on 28 November in the rest of the world in its original Tamil language, as well as in the Hindi, Telugu, Kannada, and Malayalam languages, with the Malayalam-language dub premiering on Netflix when the film released there, as opposed to premiering in theatres. An English-dubbed version of Leo was released on Netflix on 12 December 2023.

== Reception ==
=== Critical reception ===
Leo received mixed-to-positive reviews from critics who praised Vijay's performance, technical aspects, action sequences while the writing received criticism. On the review aggregator website Rotten Tomatoes, 82% of 11 critics' reviews are positive, with an average rating of 6.7/10.

Divya Nair of Rediff gave 3.5/5 stars and wrote "Lokesh has cleverly used Vijay's angst and actions to create a picture of dual personality which works perfectly for Leo. The surprise addition in the climax sequence offers some hope and the possibility of a sequel." Janani. K of India Today gave 3.5/5 stars and wrote "'Leo' is a massy commercial actioner with brilliant stunt pieces that deserve a theatrical watch." Sridevi S of The Times of India gave 3/5 stars and wrote "Though the whole 'LCU' part looks forced, one can say that with Leo, Lokesh has a strongest shot in his arm for the next franchise. Lokesh and Vijay's Leo is a lot 'bloody' than 'sweet'. Leo's roar may not be at its peak here, but, hey! it is still a Lion!"

Suhasini Srihari of Deccan Herald gave 3/5 stars and wrote "Leo sets up as a delight to Thalapathy fans, and Kanagaraj has deliberately played with the conclusion of the movie that leaves the audience in anticipation of a major collaboration in the future." Anandu Suresh of The Indian Express gave 3/5 stars and wrote "Leo is undoubtedly a feather in Vijay's cap, it is indeed a step back for writer-director Lokesh Kanagaraj." Himesh Mankad of Pinkvilla rated 2.5/5 stars and wrote "The film works primarily due to the fast-paced narrative, Vijay's powerful performance, and the LCU connection while the issue is in its wafer-thin plot, weak antagonist track, and routine writing". Sonil Dedhia of News18 rated the film 2.5/5 stars and appreciated Vijay's presence and action sequences but criticised the storyline.

Priyanka Sundar of Firstpost gave 2.5/5 stars and wrote "This is an action film first and foremost, so how were the action sequences? They were definitely not seamless. Take the shot where Leo fights off a large group of people inside the factory. The idea is to give a hawk eye's view of the entire thing." Bhuvanesh Chandar of The Hindu termed it as "Lokesh Kanagaraj's weakest film yet". Ranjani Krishnakumar of Hindustan Times wrote "Vijay's performance in emotional scenes evokes no reactions even as Lokesh Kanagaraj provides ample electrifying action scenes." Internationally, Simon Abrams of RogerEbert.com stated Leo is a formulaic but satisfying Indian remake of A History of Violence. Peter Debruge of Variety wrote "While not as consistently entertaining as last year's Vikram, "Leo" packs enough corny-but-satisfying spectacle to have fuelled, joins Kaithi and Vikram in potentially setting up an Expendables-style group effort down the road."

In response to the mixed reviews, particularly criticism of the writing in the post-interval portions, Lokesh said that being beholden to the film's release date meant that he did not have enough time to perfect the screenplay and that he would henceforth not announce release dates for his future projects early in their development.

=== Box office ===
Leo grossed ₹145 crore (US$15 million) worldwide on its opening day, which was the highest first day gross for a Tamil film, with over ₹79 crore (US$8.4 million) from India. The film surpassed Jawan to become the biggest opening for an Indian film in 2023. The film crossed ₹200 crore (US$21 million) in two days, earning ₹122 crore (US$13 million) from India becoming the fastest Tamil film to reach the ₹200 crore mark.

Leo debuted in third place at the worldwide box office, beating Killers of the Flower Moon on its opening weekend. It grossed an estimated ₹403 crore (US$43 million) worldwide from its opening weekend of four days, becoming the fastest Tamil film to reach the ₹400 crore mark. It also became the first Tamil film to enter the global weekend chart of Comscore, emerging as the number one film of the global box-office weekend. Vijay became the first Indian actor to have two films top the Global Weekend charts, the other being Master (2021).

The film grossed ₹461 crore (US$49 million) globally in seven days, becoming the highest-grossing Tamil film in its opening week. It became the fastest Tamil film to reach the ₹500 crore mark in 10 days of its release. On the film's 11th day of release, it crossed the milestone ₹300 crore mark domestically and reached ₹530 crore (US$57 million) globally. The film crossed the ₹600 crore mark at the box office worldwide in the 25 days of its release. On the other hand, Box Office India stated that the film ended its run with ₹598 crore (US$64 million) worldwide. It made ₹230 crore (US$25 million) from Tamil Nadu becoming the highest-grossing film in Tamil Nadu.

Leo emerged as the second highest-grossing Tamil film of 2023 and the seventh highest-grossing Indian film of 2023. It became the highest-grossing Tamil film overseas, the third highest-grossing Tamil film of all time, the eleventh highest-grossing South Indian film of all time and the 24th highest-grossing Indian film of all time. Leo is the highest-grossing film in the franchise as of its release.

Following its release, Leo’s box-office performance attracted public discussion, with some theatre owners and trade observers expressing doubts over the profitability of the film in relation to the reported collections. The producers dismissed these concerns, maintaining that the announced figures were accurate and that there was no misreporting of box-office data. Media coverage framed the issue as a difference of opinion between exhibitors and the production team rather than evidence of any confirmed irregularities.

== Themes ==
A central theme of Leo is identity, specifically the tension between Parthiban, a peace-loving café owner, and Leo Das, the heir to a violent crime syndicate. Critics noted that the film explores whether a person can ever truly escape their past or whether society inevitably drags them back into old roles. Lokesh Kanagaraj structures the narrative to make audiences question whether Parthi is genuinely reformed or merely repressing his violent heritage. Reviewers such as Firstpost highlighted how this duality mirrors broader questions about whether cycles of violence are inherited or chosen.

== Controversies ==
Following the release of the song "Naa Ready", Pattali Makkal Katchi president and MP Anbumani Ramadoss asked Vijay to stop promoting smoking scenes in the film. Chennai-based RTI Selvam filed an online complaint against the film with the Chennai Police Commissioner asking for action against Vijay under the Narcotic Drugs and Psychotropic Substances Act. The complaint stated that through the song, Vijay was glorifying the consumption of drugs. On 26 June 2023, Selvam submitted his complaint in person as well. A ban on the film was also demanded. As a result, the song was censored with less smoking scenes and some lyrics were modified under the suggestion of the Central Board of Film Certification (CBFC).

The background dancers, who were a part of the song, claimed that despite repeated requests, the makers are yet to pay them their full remuneration for their work. The production team clarified that the payment was sent to the Tamil Nadu Film, Television Dancers & Dance Directors Union (TANTTNNIS) for the registered members.

After the release of the trailer, the usage of expletives by Vijay was widely criticised. Later, the CBFC sent legal notices to theatres for screening the uncertified trailer. As a result, 43 seconds of the film were cut, with instances of gore and violence either blurred or replaced, although the runtime remained mostly unaffected.

== Future ==
In early August 2023, it was reported that the film would have a sequel, marking Vijay's first venture into a sequel project. The production for the sequel was reportedly expected to start in 2025 after Lokesh completes Coolie, Kaithi 2 and a sequel to Vikram. On 28 December, Lokesh commented about Leo 2, and said it would commence soon after Coolie finishes its production. However, on 2 February 2024, Vijay announced he would be shifting to politics full-time after completing two more films without mentioning Leo 2, leading to netizens assuming the project was dropped. That November, Lokesh himself questioned the project's viability.

== In other media ==
Sandy Master and Janany Kunaseelan briefly reprise their roles in Karuppu (2026), in a scene that pays homage to the café fight scene from Leo. Additionally, a character resembling Parthiban makes a faceless cameo in the same scene, portrayed by an unidentified actor.
