= Jailer 2 (soundtrack) =

2026 soundtrack album by Anirudh Ravichander

- Soundtrack album cover

Soundtrack album by Anirudh Ravichander
- Released: 30 September 2026
- Recorded: 2025–2026
- Studios: Albuquerque Records, Chennai; Sounds Right Studios, Chennai; Reengara Records, Chennai; AM Studios, Chennai; Vibe_N Studios, Chennai; Vanaj Kesav Digi Audio Waves, Chennai; Voice & Vision Studios, Chennai; Kuzhali Records, Chennai; Mystic Hues Inn Chennai; Thambi's Audio Box, Hyderabad; YRF Studios, Mumbai; The Sanctuary, Mumbai; Rottenblier Studios, Budapest
- Genre: Feature film soundtrack
- Length: 35:18
- Language: Tamil
- Label: Sun Pictures
- Producer: Anirudh Ravichander

Anirudh Ravichander chronology
The Paradise (2026)	Jailer 2 (2026)	King (2026)
External audio
- Jailer 2 – Audio Jukebox on YouTube

Singles from Jailer 2
- 1. "Ala Bolelo" Released: 21 August 2026; 2. "One Sun One Moon" Released: 25 September 2026; 3. "One Name" Released: 29 September 2026; 4. "Bindaas" Released: 30 September 2026

Jailer 2 is the soundtrack to the 2026 film of the same name directed by Nelson Dilipkumar, starring Rajinikanth. It is the sequel to Jailer (2023). The film's original score is composed by Anirudh Ravichander. The album featured 12 tracks, including instrumental numbers with lyrics written by Arunraja Kamaraj, Super Subu, Vignesh Shivan, Vivek, Thamizh Aadhavan and Heisenberg. Led by four singles, the soundtrack album was released by the production company itself on 30 September 2026 at a private launch event in Chennai.

== Background ==
The film score and soundtrack is composed by Anirudh Ravichander, marking his fifth collaboration with Nelson and sixth with Rajinikanth. As the film is a sequel to Jailer, some of the iconic musical elements, that was popular from the predecessor had been incorporated in the sequel for callback. This included the iconic war-horn sound of "Hukum", being predominantly featured in the film and was also re-purposed as "Hukum Reloaded". Some of the lyrics in the songs, denoted Rajinikanth's completion of 50 years in the film industry, especially in the songs "One Sun One Moon" and "One Name". The predominant lyricists featured in the album were Arunraja Kamaraj, Vignesh Shivan and Super Subu, who had been a part of the predecessor, while Vivek, Thamizh Aadhavan and Heisenberg would contribute as the new lyricists. Nelson revealed that despite his commitments to his music concerts and tours spanning countries, Anirudh prioritised himself to work on a tight schedule for both Jailer 2 after completing The Paradise. He also noted that due to the presence of multiple characters, the duo decided to create a 12-track album which provides a distinct musical identity for the characters.

== Release ==
The soundtrack to Jailer 2 featured 12 songs, and the album was released on 30 September 2026. The dubbed Telugu and Hindi versions of the album were launched on 9 October.

=== Singles ===
"Hukum Reloaded" was the track featured on the announcement teaser that released on 14 January 2025. The instrumental track "One Name" was released separately on 3 July 2026.

"Ala Bolelo", marketed as the first single, was released on 21 August. It featured Poorna and Rajesh Madhavan in special appearances. The song, which includes seemingly Malayalam lyrics, received backlash from Malayalis over mispronunciation and the lyrics were criticised as unintelligible gibberish. Lyricist Arunraja Kamaraj clarified that while the "Malayalam" lyrics were indeed gibberish except for a few words like Eda Mone, he added them because Nelson asked him to do so to focus on sounds rather than meaning, adding that he had no intention to hurt or ridicule anyone, and that the song was given a Kerala feel due to part of the story taking place there.

A promo for the second single "One Sun One Moon" was released on 23 September, in which Nelson teased Anirudh for his delay on completing the album owing to his concert tours abroad. The song was released on 25 September. It was described as a slow-paced elevation number that incorporates the war horn sound from "Hukum".

Anirudh teased the full version of the song "One Name" at a concert performance in Singapore. The song was released as third single on 29 September. The fourth single titled "Bindaas" featuring Nora Fatehi was released the following day, ahead of as the music launch event.

=== Audio launch ===
In July 2026, it was reported that the film's music launch event would be held in a grand manner in Malaysia co-ordinated by Malik Streams founder Dato Abdul Malik which sponsored the audio launch of Vijay's Jana Nayagan; it was speculated after Dato Abdul's meeting with Rajinikanth. However, Rajinikanth declined that opportunity as it would unfavorably create comparisons and rivalry with Vijay. Later, plans for the audio launch was supposed to be held at the Jawaharlal Nehru Indoor Stadium in Chennai during the first week of October. Later, it was reported that instead of a grand traditional audio launch, the team would held a private launch event in a concert-style format with Anirudh performing the songs with his musical team unlike other star-led music launch events. This was mostly debated due to the permission for a grand audio launch event had not been obtained citing reasons unknown.

The event titled Jailer 2 Rave was held on 30 September at a private ceremony held at the Chennai Trade Centre in Nandambakkam. It was suggested that Rajinikanth would participate in the event, but it did not happen owing to his commitments for filming Dharman at Mysore. The event was premiered on Sun NXT from 3 October and later telecasted via Sun TV the following day.

After the film's release, the theme track "Tiger Muthuvel Pandian" was released as a single on 20 October. "Roddy Theme" which teased Hrithik Roshan's character Roddy, was released as a separate single on 26 October.

== Track listing ==
Tamil
No.	Title	Lyrics	Singer(s)	Length
1.	"Ala Bolelo"	Arunraja Kamaraj	Anirudh Ravichander, Niranjana Raman, Aparna Harikumar, Deepthi Suresh	4:00
2.	"One Sun One Moon"	Heisenberg, Super Subu	Anirudh Ravichander, MS Krsna	3:37
3.	"Netru Ponavai"	Vignesh Shivan	Shankar Mahadevan	4:24
4.	"Veramaari"	Thamizh Aadhavan	Thamizh Aadhavan	2:32
5.	"Jailer 2 Theme"	Super Subu	Anirudh Ravichander, MS Krsna	1:47
6.	"Bindaas"	Super Subu	Anirudh Ravichander, Deepthi Suresh	4:14
7.	"Putaapu Gang"	Thamizh Aadhavan	Thamizh Aadhavan	2:40
8.	"Shaitaan"	Vivek, Super Subu	Romy	2:55
9.	"One Name"	Super Subu	Arunraja Kamaraj, Anirudh Ravichander, Yogisekar, Jagadeesh Kumar, Balraj, Sridhar Sena, Shenbagaraj, Govind Prasad	3:24
10.	"Dileep Theme" (Instrumental)	—	—	1:12
11.	"Dil Haareya"	Ritesh G. Rao	Ritesh G. Rao	2:58
12.	"Hukum Reloaded"	Super Subu	Anirudh Ravichander	1:32
Total length:				35:18

Extended soundtrack
No.	Title	Lyrics	Singer(s)	Length
1.	"Tiger Muthuvel Pandian"	Super Subu	Anirudh Ravichander, MS Krsna	3:17
2.	"Roddy Theme"	—	—	1:51
3.	"Bindaas × Hukum Theme"	—	—	1:35
4.	"Unfinished Business"	Anirudh Ravichander	Anirudh Ravichander, Romy, Ananthakrrishnan, Anand Kashinathan	2:57
Total length:				44:58

Telugu
No.	Title	Lyrics	Singer(s)	Length
1.	"Ala Bolelo"	Srinivasa Mouli	Anirudh Ravichander, Deepthi Suresh, Aparna Harikumar	4:00
2.	"One Sun One Moon"	Heisenberg, Bhaskarabhatla	Anirudh Ravichander, Inno Genga, MS Krsna	3:37
3.	"Marichipo"	Krishna Kanth	Shankar Mahadevan	4:24
4.	"Dadha Giri"	Asura	Asura	2:32
5.	"Jailer 2 Theme"	Bhaskarabhatla	Anirudh Ravichander, Inno Genga, MS Krsna	1:47
6.	"Bindaas"	Srinivasa Mouli	Anirudh Ravichander, Deepthi Suresh	4:14
7.	"Allam Bellam Po"	Asura	Asura	2:40
8.	"Shaitaan"	Rambabu Gosala, Super Subu	Romy	2:55
9.	"One Name"	Srinivasa Mouli, Bhaskarabhatla	Arun Kaundinya, Sri Krishna, Sahithi Chaganti	3:24
10.	"Dileep Theme" (Instrumental)	—	—	1:12
11.	"Dil Haareya"	Ritesh G. Rao	Ritesh G. Rao	2:58
12.	"Hukum Reloaded"	Bhaskarabhatla	Dinkar Kalvala, Anirudh Ravichander	1:32
Total length:				35:18

Hindi
No.	Title	Lyrics	Singer(s)	Length
1.	"Ala Bolelo"	Ritesh G. Rao	Anirudh Ravichander, Deepthi Suresh, Aparna Harikumar	4:00
2.	"One Sun One Moon"	Heisenberg, Ritesh G. Rao	Anirudh Ravichander, Inno Genga, MS Krsna	3:37
3.	"Beete Lamhe"	Ritesh G. Rao	Shankar Mahadevan	4:24
4.	"Dada Giri"	100RBH	100RBH	2:32
5.	"Jailer 2 Theme"	Ritesh G. Rao	Anirudh Ravichander, Inno Genga, MS Krsna	1:47
6.	"Bindaas"	Ritesh G. Rao	Anirudh Ravichander, Madhubanti Bagchi	4:14
7.	"Pathhar Ya Ret"	100RBH	100RBH	2:40
8.	"Shaitaan"	Raqueeb Alam, Super Subu	Romy	2:55
9.	"One Name"	Raqueeb Alam	Saatvik G Rao, J. V. Sudhanshu, Lakshmi Meghana	3:24
10.	"Dileep Theme" (Instrumental)	—	—	1:12
11.	"Dil Haareya"	Ritesh G. Rao	Ritesh G. Rao	2:58
12.	"Hukum Reloaded"	Raqueeb Alam	Ritesh G. Rao, Anirudh Ravichander	1:32
Total length:				35:18

== Reception ==
=== Critical reception ===
Bhuvanesh Chandar of The Hindu described it as an "satisfying album" except for "Ala Bolelo" which he felt out of place. Anandu Suresh of The Indian Express wrote "Anirudh's music, however, elevates the movie consistently and his obsession with vocals, which we saw amply in DC (2026), hasn't faded yet; it continues to help him create more than just mass appeal." Latha Srinivasan of NDTV summarised: "Anirudh Ravichander is once again one of the biggest assets of Jailer 2, with his background score elevating Rajinikanth's screen presence every step of the way. His song One Sun One Moon has been strategically used to reinforce the fact that at 75, Rajinikanth remains the one and only Thalaivar and Hukum too plays a role in this. Anirudh is now quite familiar with the Rajini swag and knows when to up the tempo and energy on screen and when to underplay it. Out of the two feature songs, Ala Bolelo and Bindaas, only the former makes an impact. Bindaas is quite forgettable unfortunately though it was meant to entertain. The music composer also makes several stretched scenes more engaging thanks to his BGM."

Simon Abrams of RogerEbert.com wrote that "Anirudh's bass- and beats-heavy score lays out a typically bright red carpet for the mischievous antihero, with lyrics that hail Rajini for '[making] generations dance to his tune.'" Sreeju Sudhakaran of Rediff.com wrote "The songs are disappointing [...] but Anirudh continues to bring his empowering zing to the elevation sequences with his score." Janani K of India Today wrote "Anirudh Ravichander's music is another familiar strength, but the songs occassionally interrupt the narrative's flow." Himanshi Tiwari of India TV wrote "Anirudh Ravichander impresses once again with his music. The songs and background score add energy to the film and make Rajinikanth's heroic moments even more powerful."

=== Commercial reception ===
Upon the album's release, it initially garnered mixed response from audiences, with many critics noted that the soundtrack did not produce anticipation as that of the predecessor, with "Hukum – Thalaivar Alappara" increased the hype and momentum for that film. Commentators also noted that his trademark musical arrangements and production that relied heavily on electronic music became predictable, signifying the reception for his previous albums before that, with only Coolie (2025) and DC being the exceptions. Despite the response, the album crossed 100 million streams across all music streaming and audio platforms while further topped the Spotify Top Album Debut Global upon the week of its release, as well as the Spotify Top Albums in India. By late-October, the album crossed 200 million streams.

== Personnel ==
Credits adapted from Sun TV:

- Music composer, arranger and producer: Anirudh Ravichander
- Music advisor: Ananthakrrishnan
- Creative consultant: Sajith Satya
- Session assistant: Shivakiran S
- Audio supervision and studio operations: Srinivasan M
- Head of audio (Albuquerque Records): Vinay Sridhar, Srinivasan M
- Recording engineers: Srinivasan M, Vinay Sridhar, Shivakiran S, Plural, Rajesh Kannan (Albuquerque Records, Chennai); Aswin George John (Sounds Right Studios, Chennai); Aswin Krishna, Adarsh Narayanan (Reengara Records, Chennai); Pradeep Menon, Aravind MS (AM Studios, Chennai); Lokesh Vijayakumar (Vibe_N Studios, Chennai); Lijesh Kumar (Voice and Vision Studios, Chennai); K K Senthil Prasad (Vanaj Kesav Digi Audio Waves, Chennai); Srinath Komanduri (Thambi's Audio Box, Hyderabad); Vijay Dayal, Abhishek Khandelwal, Sagar Sathe (YRF Studios, Mumbai); Vedant Uttarkar (The Sanctuary, Mumbai)
- Mixing: Vinay Sridhar, Srinivasan M (Albuquerque Records); Rupendar Venkatesh (Mix Magic Studios, Chennai)
- Mastering: Luca Pretolesi, Alistair Pintus (Studio DMI, Las Vegas); Rupendar Venkatesh (Mix Magic Studios, Chennai); Akash Shravan (Sai Dhwani Studios, Hyderabad); Abin Paul (Mixwithabin, Kochi); Vivek Thomas, Sibin Wilson (VTP Studios, Kochi)
- Music coordinator: Velavan B

Performers

- Backing vocals: Amal Raj, Arjun Vijay, Rakesh Bhavani, Saatvik G Rao, Srinath Komanduri
- Additional vocals: Niranjana Raman, Aparna Harikumar, Deepthi Suresh, Yogi Sekar, Jagadeesh Kumar, Balraj, Sridhar Sena, Shenbagaraj, Govind Prasad
- Piano, keys, synth, rhythm and orchestral programming: Anirudh Ravichander
- Rhythm production: Kalyan, Amal Raj
- Additional rhythm programming: Karthik Vamsi, Anand Kashinath, Marshall Robinson, Clinton Robinson
- Additional orchestral and keyboard programming: IC, Shashank Vijay, Arish, Smith Asher, Narendar Sankar, Dan Kristen
- Additional music programming: Smith Asher, Anand Kashinath, Nivin Raphael, Dan Kristen
- Cinematic percussion and electronic rhythm design: Shashank Vijay
- Ethnic percussion programming: Karthik Vamsi
- Electric guitar: Keba Jeremiah, Amal Raj, Sajith Satya
- Acoustic guitar: Keba Jeremiah, Amal Raj, Chris Jaison, Godfray Immanuel
- Bass guitar: Keba Jeremiah
- Solo violin: Amal Raj, Ananthakrrishnan
- Violas: Amal Raj, Vishnu Ramprasad
- Dobro, oud, bazuki, ukulele, ruan, guzheng: Amal Raj
- Flute: Kamalakar, Ashish Venkateswaran, Nikhil Ram TP
- Sitar: Kishore Kumar
- Veena: Punya Srinivas
- Indian ethnic percussions: Krishna Kishor, Karthik Vamsi

The Indian Choral Ensemble

- Recording engineers: Karthick Manickavasakam (Kuzhali Records, Chennai)
- Choir conductor: Kalyani Nair, Karthick Manickavasakam
- Choir performers: Aparna Harikumar, Deepthi Suresh, Sushmita Narasimhan, Vanathisree Suresh, Sivaranjani Chandramouli, Prashanth Mohanasundaram, Shibi Sreenivasan, Shridhar Ramesh, Vikram Chandrakumar, Aravind Annest

Budapest String Orchestra

- Conductor: Péter Illényi
- Session producer: Bálint Sapszon
- Orchestra Indian representative: Guna Balasubramanian
- Recording engineer: Dénes Rédly (Rottenbiller Studios, Budapest)
- Studio assistant: Levente Böde
- Librarian: Kati Réti
- Orchestrators: Abishek Viswanathan, Guna Balasubramanian, Sanjay RA

Chennai Strings Orchestra

- Conductor: Yensone Bhagyanathan
- Assistant conductor: Abishek Viswanathan
- Session supervisor: Guna Balasubramanian
- Session assistant: Ramesh Babloo, Sravan Krishnakumar
- Recording engineers: Biju James, KS Maniratnam (Mystic Hues Inn, Chennai); Midhun Manoj (Soundtown Studios, Chennai)
- Violins: Vignesh U, Balaji A Fegan, Kumar, Saaji, Vinitha, Ilayan, Kannan, Babu, Vignesh S, Sekar
- Violas: Ebinezar Gnanraj, Dinesh, Harish, Kumar, Hirthick Roshan
- Cello: Balaji M, Prem, Vaijayanthi, Sravan Krishnakumar
- Double bass: David

== See also ==
- Jailer (soundtrack)
