= The Paradise (soundtrack) =

2026 film soundtrack album

- Soundtrack album cover

Soundtrack album by Anirudh Ravichander
- Released: 24 September 2026
- Recorded: June 2025–September 2026
- Studios: Alburquerque Records, Chennai; Mix Magic, Chennai
- Genre: Feature film soundtrack
- Length: 35:18
- Language: Telugu
- Label: Saregama
- Producer: Anirudh Ravichander

Anirudh Ravichander chronology
DC (2026)	The Paradise (2026)	Jailer 2 (2026)

Singles from The Paradise
- 1. "Aaya Sher" Released: 24 February 2026; 2. "Yeshanagula" Released: 29 August 2026; 3. "Anjaana Anjaani" Released: 21 September 2026

The Paradise is the soundtrack album composed by Anirudh Ravichander to the 2026 Telugu-language period action drama film of the same name directed by Srikanth Odela and produced by Sudhakar Cherukuri and Ishan Saksena under Sri Lakshmi Venkateshwara Cinemas and IVY Entertainment, starring Nani, Mohan Babu, Kayadu Lohar, Sonali Kulkarni and Raghav Juyal. The album featured nine tracks with lyrics written by Kasarla Shyam, Kittu Vissapragada, Devarkonda Bhikshapathi and Heisenberg. Led by three singles, the album was released under the Saregama label on 24 September 2026, day-and-date with the film's release.

== Background ==
The soundtrack is composed by Anirudh Ravichander, marking his first collaboration with Odela and third with Nani after Jersey and Nani's Gang Leader (both 2019). Anirudh's involvement was officially confirmed by the production house on his birthday, 16 October 2024. Odela considered working with Anirudh being "comfortable" praising him for understanding the musical sensibilities and delivering exactly what the director had intended. He affectionately called Anirudh "bakkodu" (lit. 'brother') during the film's promotions.

The music consisted of folk songs from Telangana and Andhra Pradesh deciphering it more "gritty" and "raw" matching the film's aesthetic. The album further accompanied popular folk singers performing the tracks. The Telugu folk song "Yeshanagula Kattameeda" had been recreated for this film. Speaking about that idea, Odela explained that he used to listen to the folk song when he was in his childhood and wanted to recreate that number in Dasara (2023) but could not do so. When he discussed about the idea of recreating "Yeshanagula" for this film, Anirudh accepted the offer.

The film's background score was not complete until closer to the film's September release. Despite criticism for the teaser music, sources to the team claimed that Anirudh has to work on the film once the final edit is locked and also had previous film commitments and concert tours. The re-recording work commenced mid-September and continued for few days, which resulted in Anirudh missing the pre-release promotional event.

== Release ==
In May 2025, the audio rights were acquired by Saregama Music for ₹18 crore (US$1.9 million). Shortly afterwards, "The Paradise Theme", which featured in the first promotional teaser of the film, was released on 15 May 2025, although it did not feature in the soundtrack.

The first single, "Aaya Sher" was released on 24 February 2026 coinciding Nani's birthday. The second single, "Yeshanagula" was released on 28 August 2026 at Anirudh's concert tour in Dallas, Texas with him performing the song with Nani in attendance. The song later released through digital platforms the following day. The third single, "Anjaana Anjaani" was released at the pre-release event held in Shilpakala Vedika in Hyderabad on 21 September. The complete album, featuring nine songs was released on 24 September, the same date as the film.

== Reception ==
=== Critical reception ===
Sanjana Pulugurtha of The Times of India wrote "The music has its moments too. Anirudh Ravichander's songs occasionally give the film the kind of lift its scale demands. 'Aaya Sher' brings energy and swagger, while 'Yeshanagula' is one of the few portions in the second half that genuinely feels like a high point. The background score, however, is less consistent. In some sequences, it heightens the atmosphere effectively; in others, it seems to be insisting on an intensity that the scene itself has not earned."

Neeshita Nyayapati of Hindustan Times wrote "Anirudh Ravichander delivers what is probably his weakest background score. A shame after DC, which shone due to his work." Balakrishna Ganeshan of The News Minute wrote "Composer Anirudh keeps amping up the music to elevate a scene's intensity but a high volume cannot polish incoherent and lazy writing." Yashaswini Sri of The Indian Express wrote "Anirudh Ravichander's songs work but his background score struggles to elevate the material. It is probably the weakest compositions and work in Anirudh's discography."

Sangeetha Devi Dundoo of The Hindu wrote "Anirudh Ravichander's music cannot salvage the dull narrative." Suresh Kavirayani of Cinema Express added that one of the "major minus is Anirudh Ravichander's background score, which is excessively loud and fails to make the desired impact. The songs Aaya Sher and Yeshunagula were already popular before the release, but apart from these two songs, Anirudh does not offer much in this film."

=== Commercial reception ===
The first single "Aaya Sher" emerged as a chartbuster post release, with praise directed towards the composition, use of native folk instrumentation as well as the choreography with Nani's dance moves becoming viral. It topped the YouTube charts in India as well as the United Arab Emirates, while also significantly trending on United Kingdom, Australia, New Zealand, United States, Canada, Saudi Arabia and Singapore. As of July 2026, the song crossed 200 million views. "Yeshanagula" also achieved significant success after its release; music writer Karthik Narasimhan and Srivatsan Nadathur of The Hindu also credited "Aaya Sher" and "Yeshanagula" being instrumental in increasing the film's hype and anticipation.

== Track listing ==
Track listing
No.	Title	Lyrics	Singer(s)	Length
1.	"Aaya Sher"	Kasarla Shyam	Addula Jangireddy, Arjun Chandy, Akunoori Devaiah	4:47
2.	"Yeshanagula"	Kasarla Shyam	Prabha Bangarigalla, Addula Jangireddy	3:08
3.	"Sammakka"	Kasarla Shyam	Anirudh Ravichander	3:12
4.	"Dhumavati"	Traditional	Mangli	6:03
5.	"Anjaana Anjaani"	Kittu Vissapragada	Anirudh Ravichander, Sublahshini	3:51
6.	"Uyyalo Uyyalo" (Female)	Kasarla Shyam	Madhushree	3:42
7.	"Welcome to the Paradise"	Heisenberg	Siddharth Basrur	3:10
8.	"Koduka Na Muddu Koduka"	Devarkonda Bhikshapathi	Ashwini	2:35
9.	"Uyyalo Uyyalo" (Male)	Kasarla Shyam	Anirudh Ravichander	2:24
10.	"The Paradise Theme OST"	Instrumental	Anirudh Ravichander, Arjun Chandy	1:41
11.	"Vikram Maalik Theme"	Heisenberg	Anirudh Ravichander	0:49
12.	"Jadal Zamana (Interval Theme)"	Instrumental	Anirudh Ravichander	1:20
Total length:				35:18

== Chart performance ==
Chart	Song	Peak position	Ref.
India (Billboard)	"Aaya Sher"	7	
India (Billboard)	"Yeshanagula"	15	
Asian Music Chart (OCC)	"Aaya Sher"	8	
Asian Music Chart (OCC)	"Yeshanagula"	3	
