= DC (soundtrack) =

2026 soundtrack album by Anirudh Ravichander

- Soundtrack album cover

Soundtrack album by Anirudh Ravichander
- Released: 24 July 2026
- Recorded: 2025–2026
- Studios: Albuquerque Records, Chennai; Panchathan Record Inn and AM Studios, Chennai; Reengara Records, Chennai; VMS Studios, Mumbai
- Genre: Feature film soundtrack
- Length: 40:34
- Language: Tamil
- Label: Sun Pictures
- Producer: Anirudh Ravichander

Anirudh Ravichander chronology
| Jana Nayagan (2026) | DC (2026) | The Paradise (2026) |
External audio
- DC – Official Audio Jukebox on YouTube

Singles from DC
- 1. "Ain't Nobody" Released: 1 November 2025; 2. "Bloody Valentine" Released: 14 February 2026; 3. "Raga of Revenge" Released: 16 May 2026; 4. "Hangova" Released: 6 July 2026; 5. "Bum Baa Diga Diga" Released: 18 July 2026

DC is the soundtrack album composed by Anirudh Ravichander to the 2026 Tamil-language film of the same name directed by Arun Matheswaran and produced by Sun Pictures starring Lokesh Kanagaraj, Wamiqa Gabbi and Sanjana Krishnamoorthy. The film's soundtrack consisted of 15 tracks, combining instrumental themes and songs, and featured lyrics written by Heisenberg, Vedan and Ashwin Krishna. Preceded by five singles, the album was released on 24 July 2026 under the production house's label. The soundtrack received rave reviews and considered to be one of the best works of Anirudh.

== Background ==
The soundtrack is composed by Anirudh Ravichander, in his first film with Arun and fifth with Lokesh. The album accompanies 15 tracks, the most Anirudh had composed for a film. Except for the instrumental tracks most of songs had lyrics written by Heisenberg, while Vedan and Ashwin Krishna wrote few songs. The track "Raga of Revenge", featured in the film's trailer screened at the 2026 Cannes Film Festival, was composed just two days before the festival. Anirudh's vision was to make the track sound as Indian as possible, blending elements from Carnatic and Hindustani classical music.

== Marketing and release ==
The song "Ain't Nobody", which featured in the announcement teaser, was released as a single on 1 November 2025. "Bloody Valentine", the instrumental track which featured in the separate glimpse video was also released on 14 February 2026, Valentine's Day. "Raga of Revenge" was featured in the trailer before being released separately on 16 May. The song "Hangova" was released on 6 July, followed by "Bum Baa Diga Diga" which released on 18 July.

The film's music launch event titled DC Rave was held at the office of Sun TV Network in Chennai, as a secluded indoor event on 24 July, where the film's cast and crew attended the event along with Anirudh performing the 15-track album live. The album was also released on the same date, while the event premiered at Sun TV on 2 August. After the film's release, the instrumental number "Bloody Band" was released separately on 10 August.

== Track listing ==
DC (Tamil)
| No. | Title | Lyrics | Singer(s) | Length |
|---|---|---|---|---|
| 1. | "Raga of Revenge" (Instrumental) | — | Faraz | 2:11 |
| 2. | "Ain't Nobody" | Heisenberg | Ram Kumar | 2:42 |
| 3. | "Namaste" | Heisenberg | Ashwin Krishna | 2:30 |
| 4. | "The Rose" (Instrumental) | — | — | 2:14 |
| 5. | "Hangova" | Heisenberg | Anirudh Ravichander | 4:07 |
| 6. | "Vizhigale" | Heisenberg | Anirudh Ravichander | 1:56 |
| 7. | "Don't Give a Damn" | Heisenberg | Ashwin Krishna | 3:05 |
| 8. | "Thaalam Trip" (Instrumental) | — | Shivapriya | 2:20 |
| 9. | "Echoes of DC" (Instrumental) | — | — | 2:50 |
| 10. | "Bum Baa Diga Diga" | Heisenberg, Vedan | Anirudh Ravichander, Vedan | 3:25 |
| 11. | "Das and Parvathy" (Instrumental) | — | — | 3:01 |
| 12. | "Raga of Madness" | — | Vishal Mishra, Ashwin Krishna | 3:18 |
| 13. | "Malayla" | Ashwin Krishna | Ashwin Krishna | 2:17 |
| 14. | "Bloody Valentine" (Instrumental) | — | — | 1:41 |
| 15. | "Jaya Jaya Shankara" | Heisenberg | Ashwin Krishna | 2:57 |
| Total length: | | | | 40:43 |

Extended soundtrack
| No. | Title | Lyrics | Singer(s) | Length |
|---|---|---|---|---|
| 1. | "Bloody Band" (Instrumental) | — | — | 2:11 |

DC (Telugu)
| No. | Title | Lyrics | Singer(s) | Length |
|---|---|---|---|---|
| 1. | "Raga of Revenge" (Instrumental) | — | Faraz | 2:11 |
| 2. | "Ain't Nobody" | Heisenberg | Ram Kumar | 2:42 |
| 3. | "Namaste" | Heisenberg | Ashwin Krishna | 2:30 |
| 4. | "The Rose" (Instrumental) | — | — | 2:14 |
| 5. | "Hangova" | Sri Sai Kiran, Heisenberg | Anirudh Ravichander, Adithya RK | 4:07 |
| 6. | "Kanulaloo" | Sri Sai Kiran | Ritesh G Rao | 1:56 |
| 7. | "Don't Give a Damn" | Heisenberg | Ashwin Krishna | 3:05 |
| 8. | "Thaalam Trip" (Instrumental) | — | Shivapriya | 2:20 |
| 9. | "Echoes of DC" (Instrumental) | — | — | 2:50 |
| 10. | "Bum Baa Diga Diga" | Sri Sai Kiran, Heisenberg | Anirudh Ravichander, Asura | 3:25 |
| 11. | "Das and Parvathy" (Instrumental) | — | — | 3:01 |
| 12. | "Raga of Madness" | — | Vishal Mishra, Ashwin Krishna | 3:18 |
| 13. | "Malayla" | Ashwin Krishna | Ashwin Krishna | 2:17 |
| 14. | "Bloody Valentine" (Instrumental) | — | — | 1:41 |
| 15. | "Jaya Jaya Shankara" | Heisenberg | Ashwin Krishna | 2:57 |
| Total length: | | | | 40:43 |

DC the Bloody Valentine (Hindi)
| No. | Title | Lyrics | Singer(s) | Length |
|---|---|---|---|---|
| 1. | "Raga of Revenge" (Instrumental) | — | Faraz | 2:11 |
| 2. | "Ain't Nobody" | Heisenberg | Ram Kumar | 2:42 |
| 3. | "Namaste" | Heisenberg | Ashwin Krishna | 2:30 |
| 4. | "The Rose" (Instrumental) | — | — | 2:14 |
| 5. | "Hangova" | Ritesh G Rao, Heisenberg | Anirudh Ravichander, Adithya RK | 4:07 |
| 6. | "Aankhen Yeh" | Ritesh G Rao | Ritesh G Rao | 1:56 |
| 7. | "Don't Give a Damn" | Heisenberg | Ashwin Krishna | 3:05 |
| 8. | "Thaalam Trip" (Instrumental) | — | Shivapriya | 2:20 |
| 9. | "Echoes of DC" (Instrumental) | — | — | 2:50 |
| 10. | "Bum Baa Diga Diga" | Ritesh G Rao, Heisenberg | Anirudh Ravichander, Asura | 3:25 |
| 11. | "Das and Parvathy" (Instrumental) | — | — | 3:01 |
| 12. | "Raga of Madness" | — | Vishal Mishra, Ashwin Krishna | 3:18 |
| 13. | "Malayla" | Ashwin Krishna | Ashwin Krishna | 2:17 |
| 14. | "Bloody Valentine" (Instrumental) | — | — | 1:41 |
| 15. | "Jaya Jaya Shankara" | Heisenberg | Ashwin Krishna | 2:57 |
| Total length: | | | | 40:43 |

== Reception ==
Bhuvanesh Chandar of The Hindu said that "[Anirudh] truly goes berserk in DC. He unleashes a medley of classical-heavy compositions — and rock-heavy earworms like "Ain't Nobody" and "Bum Baa Diga Diga" — that make DC almost realise its full potential". Nandini Ramnath of Scroll.in wrote "Anirudh Ravichander's background score and songs, which include a couple of bizarre tracks in English, works overly hard on putting the cool into the carnage." Titas Chowdhury of News18 wrote "what becomes the strongest link of DC is Anirudh Ravichander's tunes. It leans heavily into a Western, English-infused soundscape, complementing the film's pulp motif. Electric guitar riffs, synth-heavy arrangements and bass drum flourishes give DC an edgy aesthetic that amplifies its swagger. Anirudh's music becomes an extension of the film's rebellious personality."

Neeshita Nyayapati of Hindustan Times wrote "Anirudh gives what's probably the best score of his career, with tunes that weave together everything from Afro and country Western to Hindustani and Carnatic. The music is never distracting but stands out even in the most chaotic scenes. By the time the now-familiar DC theme music rolls around, you just know he has a winner at hand." M Suganth of The Times of India wrote "[Anirudh's] pulsating score, deliciously fusing EDM with classical music, powers — and in a couple of scenes, overpowers — the film". Avinash Ramachandran of The New Indian Express wrote "Anirudh's soundtrack is the lifeline of DC".

== Personnel credits ==
Credits adapted from Sun Pictures:

- Music composer and producer– Anirudh Ravichander
- Musical arrangements– Ananthakrrishnan, Sajith Satya, Ravi G
- Music advisor– Ananthakrrishnan
- Creative consultant– Sajith Satya
- Studios– Albuquerque Records, Chennai; AM Studios, Chennai; Reengara Records, Chennai; VMS Studios, Mumbai
- Recording engineers– Vinay Sridhar, Srinivasan M, Shivakiran S, Pradeep Menon, Aravind MS, S Padmasharan, Aswin Krishna, Adarsh Narayanan, Trihangku Lahkar
- Mixing engineers– Vinay Sridhar, Srinivasan M, Rupendar Venkatesh, Akash Shravan, Abin Paul, Balu Thankachan, Ishit Kuberkar
- Mastering engineers– Vinay Sridhar, Srinivasan M, Luca Pretolsi, Alistair Pintus, Rupendar Venkatesh, Vivek Thomas, Sibin Wilson, Akash Shravan, Abin Paul
- Musicians' coordinator – B Velavan

Instruments

- Keyboard, synth and rhythm programming– Anirudh Ravichander, Marshall Robinson, Clinton Robinson
- Additional programming– Dan Kristen, Anshuman Sharma, Karthick Manickavasakam, Nivin Raphael
- Orchestral programming– Dan Kristen
- Rhythm production– Karthick Manickavasakam, Karthik Vamsi
- Vocal production– Anshuman Sharma
- Acoustic guitar– Sajith Satya
- Chants– Pandit K S Mani Sasthirigal, Brahmasri Nannilam R. Srikrishna Ganapatigal, Brahmsri M Sankaranarayanan Sashtrigal, Pandit R Sairaman Vadhyar
- Electric guitar– Keba Jeremiah, Sajith Satya
- Electric piano– Anirudh Ravichander
- Horns– Francis Akwuba-Charles
- Harmonies– Arjun Chandy
- Mridangam– Karthik Vamsi
- Percussions– Karthick Manickavasakam
- Tavil– MS Amirthavarshini, Anu Keerthi
- Violin– Ananthakrrishnan
