= Aaya Sher =

2026 single composed by Anirudh Ravichander

- Song cover

Single by Anirudh Ravichander and Kasarla Shyam featuring Addula Jangireddy and Arjun Chandy

from the album The Paradise
- Released: 24 February 2026
- Recorded: 2025
- Studio: Albuquerque Records, Chennai
- Genre: Folk; dance music
- Length: 4:46
- Label: Saregama
- Songwriter: Kasarla Shyam
- Composer: Anirudh Ravichander
- Producer: Anirudh Ravichander

Music video
- "Aaya Sher" on YouTube

Singles from The Paradise
- 1. "Aaya Sher"; 2. "Yeshanagula"; 3. "Anjaana Anjaani"

"Aaya Sher" (transl. The Lion has come) is a 2026 Indian Telugu-language song composed by Anirudh Ravichander, with lyrics written by Kasarla Shyam, and sung by Addula Jangireddy and Arjun Chandy, for the soundtrack album of the 2026 film The Paradise. The first single of the album, through Saregama, it was released on 24 February 2026.

== Background and composition ==
The film is composed by Anirudh Ravichander, in his third collaboration with Nani after Jersey and Gang Leader (both 2019).

The song lyrics written by Kasarla Shyam and sung by Addula Jangireddy and Arjun Chandy. The song presents Nani's character as a powerful, feared figure emerging from a rough, working-class/slum environment. Its lyrics deliberately use a strong Telangana dialect and street vocabulary, giving the character an intensely local identity rather than making the introduction sound like a conventional polished film song. Jangireddy's voice is especially important to the song's character. Rather than using only a conventionally trained playback voice, the production foregrounds a raw folk vocal texture. Arjun's supplements this with the chorus and additional vocal layers. The Hindi word of "Aaya Sher" is meant to 'The lion has arrived' or 'The lion has come'.

== Release ==
The first single was announced by makers on 9 February 2026, revealing the song's title. The first single, titled "Aaya Sher" was released on 24 February 2026, coinciding with Nani's birthday.

== Reception ==
The song of "Aaya Sher" received positive reviews.

The Indian Express noted "The track is built on a bed of tribal percussion and gritty electronic beats. It's raw, heavy, and rooted, quite deliberately, in the soil of Telangana." Aman Kumar from MensXP wrote the song "His chiselled physique and striking physical transformation have left audiences stunned, adding to the growing buzz around the film."

Suresh Kavirayani from Cinema Express noted that song "The energetic beats, mass appeal, and gripping visuals have made it one of the most talked-about tracks in recent times. Social media platforms have been flooded with reels, shorts, and fan edits celebrating the song’s vibe and Nani’s electrifying screen presence."

M Snehanjali from Moneycontrol noted, "The song's rising popularity was evident through the concert too, where fans did not only sing along to the song but also celebrated the movie in their own special ways. In fact, many attendees were seen recreating Nani's look from the film — a trend that has now spilled over onto social media. From outfits to styling, fans are embracing the character's vibe, turning it into a viral phenomenon."

== Impact ==
Actor Nani's hookstep in the music video went viral. Sunrisers Hyderabad was subsequently licensed as official anthem of the song during 2026 Indian Premier League.

== Live performances ==
Anirudh performed the song live at the Anirudh's concert held on 23 March 2026 at the G. M. C. Balayogi Athletic Stadium, Gachibowli, Hyderabad.

== Credits and personnel ==
Credits adapted from YouTube.

- Anirudh Ravichander – Composer, Rhythm, Programmer
- Kasarla Shyam – Lyrics
- Addula Jangireddy, Arjun Chandy – Vocals
- Akunoori Devaihah, Yogi Sekar, Sridhar Sena – Backing Vocals
- Rakesh MS – Trumpet and Flugelhorn
- Kalyan – Rhythm produced
- Karthik Vamsi, Shashank Vijay – Additional rhythm programmer
- Arish – Additional music programmer
- Ananthakrrishnan – Music advisor
- Sajith Satya – Creative consultant
- Shivakiran S – Session assistant, Engineer
- Vinay Sridhar, Srinivasan M – Mixing engineer
- Rupendar Venkatesh – Mastering engineer
- Velavan B – Music coordinator

== Charts ==
Chart performances for "Aaya Sher"
Chart (2026)	Peak position
India (Billboard)	7
UK Asian Music Chart (OCC)	8
