= Kaavaalaa =

- Official song cover

Single by Shilpa Rao

from the album Jailer
- Language: Tamil; Telugu
- Released: 6 July 2023
- Recorded: March–April 2023
- Studio: Albuquerque Records, Chennai; AM Studios, Chennai; Studio DMI, Las Vegas
- Genre: EDM; Kuthu; pop
- Length: 3:10
- Label: Sun Pictures
- Composer: Anirudh Ravichander
- Lyricist: Arunraja Kamaraj
- Producer: Anirudh Ravichander

Jailer track listing
- 1. "Kaavaalaa"; 2. "Jailer Theme"; 3. "Rathamaarey"; 4. "Muthuvel Pandian Theme"; 5. "Hukum – Thalaivar Alappara"; 6. "Jailer Drill"; 7. "Jujubee"; 8. "Alappara Theme"

Shilpa Rao singles chronology
"Numaani" (2023)	"Kaavaalaa" (2023)	"Chaleya" (2023)

Music video
- "Kaavaalaa" on YouTube

"Kaavaalaa" (transl. Do you want?) is an Indian Tamil-language song composed by Anirudh Ravichander, written by Arunraja Kamaraj and performed by Shilpa Rao, for the soundtrack album of the 2023 film Jailer, starring Rajinikanth and written and directed by Nelson Dilipkumar for Sun Pictures. It was released on 6 July 2023 as the lead single from the album through the production house.

== Composition and recording ==
"Kaavaalaa" opens with a flute interlude that occurs predominantly to provide an Afrobeat-kind of music. The humming after the hook line shared similarities with that of "Aadaludan Paadalai Kettu" from Kudiyirundha Koyil (1968).

It was recorded during the end of March 2023, when Anirudh had recorded the female portions for the song "Chaleya" with Shilpa Rao at a jam session in his own studio. Impressed by her vocals, Anirudh had insisted on Rao recording the track as he found her vocals being too apt for it. As Rao's first song in Tamil after a decade, she was assisted with the pronunciation which "[made] the recording really enjoyable".

Rao was shown the footage of the song, so that she could get the tone correct. She received the tune first so that she could rehearse the lyrics for two days and had recorded the song within an hour.

== Lyrics ==
The lyrics for the song was written by Arunraja Kamaraj, who previously associated with Anirudh on writing lyrics for "Im So Cool" and "Shake That" from Kaaki Sattai (2015), "Kannula Thimiru" from Darbar (2020) and "Kutti Story" from Master (2021). Anirudh wanted to experiment with the song, as if it must be a song with Telugu lyrics, being written by a non-Telugu person. Kamaraj had performed songs in five languages, which made him easier to write a song with catchphrases from various languages. After sorting out various phonetics, he found "Kaavaalaa" to be catchy and eventually becoming the hook line of the track.

According to Kamaraj, he described it as a bilingual song as it mixed Telugu lyrics with Tamil lines. Since the song was written only for Bhatia's character, he tried to approach the lyrics without the "Rajini filter" but eventually surprised to see him being a part of the song. He wrote the entire lyrics for the song within 30 minutes.

== Music video ==
The song was filmed at the Ramoji Film City in Hyderabad during a brief schedule from 29 May to 1 June 2023. It featured Rajinikanth and Bhatia, with Sunil, Sunil Reddy, Redin Kingsley and Jaffer Sadiq also appearing. Jani Master choreographed the song.

== Marketing and release ==
The song was teased with a promo video featuring Nelson, Anirudh and Kamaraj that was released on 3 July 2023. It was released as the lead single from the album on 6 July, accompanied with a lyrical video featuring snippets from the song. The video song was released on 6 September.

It was also released in Telugu as "Kaavaali", in Hindi as "Tu Aa Dilbara", in Kannada as "Kaavaalaayya", and in Malayalam under the same title, with Sindhuja Srinivasan performing all the versions in place of Shilpa Rao. The Telugu version was supposed to release along with an event at CMR College in Hyderabad on 26 July, cancelled due to the heavy rains, and instead released directly through digital platforms. However, a promotional event was held to release the song's Hindi version in Mumbai on 27 July.

== Reception ==
Meera Venugopal of Radio Mirchi described it as "one of the most delightful item tracks in recent times". A critic from The Indian Express described it as a "raunchy number" with lyrics that are "more about the rhyming words and less about the meaning." Anindita Mukherjee of India Today wrote "Tamannaah Bhatia owns the track and makes it her own with her sizzling moves." DT Next wrote: "The percussion-heavy peppy song has been well-staged in a colourful set. Arunraja Kamaraj just came up with the right ingredients needed for the lyrics to be instantly attractive. Jani Master's choreography too is on the mark." In his year-ender review for Scroll.in, Devarsi Ghosh mentioned the song which "scores for its tune, beats, and Shilpa Rao's uncharacteristic star turn in an item song."

== Impact ==
The lyrical video became viral upon its release crossing 100 million views within a month. The video song of the film was the 6th most-viewed music video of 2023, according to YouTube Trends. It was also one of the ten-most searched regional songs searched on Amazon Alexa.

The hook step performed by Bhatia went viral upon social media, resulting in numerous recreations. Some of them includes versions Vijay Varma, and Ragini Dwivedi.

== Credits ==
- Anirudh Ravichander – composer, arranger, programmer, keyboard, synth and rhythm
- Shilpa Rao – vocal
- Arunraja Kamaraj – lyricist
- Navin – flute, woodwinds
- Vedha – morsing
- Ananthakrrishnan – music advisor, violin
- Shashank Vijay – rhythm, darbuka
- Kalyan – rhythm
- Arish – keyboard
- Pradeep PJ – keyboard
- Srinivasan M – recording and mixing engineer (Albuquerque Records, Chennai)
- Shivakiran S – recording engineer (Albuquerque Records, Chennai)
- Pradeep Baskaran – recording engineer (AM Studios, Chennai)
- Sathya Narayanan – recording engineer (AM Studios, Chennai)
- Ainul Haq – recording engineer (AM Studios, Chennai)
- Sathish V Saravanan – recording engineer (AM Studios, Chennai)
- Vinay Sridhar – mixing engineer (Albuquerque Records, Chennai)
- Luca Pretolesi – mastering engineer (Studio DMI, Las Vegas)
- Alistair Pintus – mastering assistance
- Sajith Satya – creative consultant
- Velavan B – music co-ordinator

== Chart performance ==
Chart	Peak position
India (Billboard) Kaavaalaa	22
Asian Music Chart (OCC)	12

== Awards and nominations ==
Award	Date of ceremony	Category	Recipient(s) and nominee(s)	Result	Ref.
Ananda Vikatan Cinema Awards	22 June 2024	Best Female Playback Singer	Shilpa Rao	Nominated	
Ananda Vikatan Cinema Awards	22 June 2024	Best Lyricist	Arunraja Kamaraj	Nominated	
Filmfare Awards South	3 August 2024	Best Female Playback Singer – Tamil	Shilpa Rao	Nominated	
IIFA Utsavam	27 September 2024	Playback Singer – Female	Shilpa Rao	Nominated	
