= Jailer (soundtrack) =

- Soundtrack album cover

Soundtrack album by Anirudh Ravichander
- Released: 28 July 2023
- Recorded: 2022–2023
- Studios: Albuquerque Records, Chennai
- Genre: Feature film soundtrack
- Length: 18:24
- Language: Tamil
- Label: Sun Pictures
- Producer: Anirudh Ravichander

Anirudh Ravichander chronology
Thiruchitrambalam (2022)	Jailer (2023)	Jawan (2023)
External audio
- Jailer (Official Audio Jukebox) on YouTube

Singles from Jailer
- 1. "Kaavaalaa" Released: 6 July 2023; 2. "Hukum – Thalaivar Alappara" Released: 17 July 2023; 3. "Jujubee" Released: 26 July 2023

Jailer is the soundtrack album to the 2023 film of the same name directed by Nelson Dilipkumar, starring Rajinikanth. The film's original score is composed by Anirudh Ravichander, whose soundtrack consists of eight tracks: four songs written by Arunraja Kamaraj, Vignesh Shivan and Super Subu and four instrumental tracks. Three of them—"Kaavaalaa", "Hukum – Thalaivar Alappara" and "Jujubee"—were released as singles prior to the album's release on 28 July 2023, at the Jawaharlal Nehru Indoor Stadium in Chennai.

== Background ==
Anirudh has been associated with Nelson since his directorial debut Kolamaavu Kokila (2018). The film also marked his third collaboration with Rajinikanth following Petta (2019) and Darbar (2020). He described the film's soundtrack as a "blend of mass appeal and emotional depth" with most of the themes and songs were composed with the fans mind, whereas the song "Kaavaalaa" was curated for younger audiences and female listeners, and "Rathamaarey" was composed in order to connect with families across all demographics.

Anirudh revealed that he did meet Shilpa Rao for recording one of the tracks in Jawan, as per Shah Rukh Khan's suggestion as she had earlier performed "Besharam Rang" in Pathaan. Simultaneously, he started recording the track "Kaavaalaa" and he had felt Rao's vocals were apt for the song. This was Rao's first Tamil song after a decade, after performing "Oru Maalai Neram" from Naan Mahaan Alla (2010). She rehearsed performing the lyrics for two days and sang the track within two hours. Nelson further suggested Arunraja Kamaraj to write the lyrics as he did not know Telugu and experimented on how a person who was unfamiliar on Telugu language, would write a Telugu song.

Anirudh's classmate Super Subu, who had been a fan of Rajinikanth, contributed two of the tracks in the album. Since Nelson and the studio executives suggested Subu's contribution to the soundtrack, Anirudh roped him to write the song "Hukum" which he finished within two hours.

== Release ==
Jailer's soundtrack, consisting of eight songs released on 28 July 2023 through digital platforms. Its physical release, coincided with an event held at the Jawaharlal Nehru Indoor Stadium in Chennai, with the presence of the cast and crew, and also featured a live performance of Anirudh and his musical team. The event was later broadcast on Sun TV at 6 August.

=== Singles ===
"Kaavaalaa" the first song from the album was teased with a promotional video released on 3 July 2023. The single was released in digital platforms on 6 July 2023, and a lyrical video accompanying the song released through YouTube. Although the song garnered mixed reception, it became viral upon its release, crossing over 100 million views within a month. The hook step performed by Tamannaah Bhatia went viral on social media.

"Hukum", the second single from the album, released on 17 July 2023. Performed by Anirudh himself, the song was described as "an ode to Superstar's swag" according to The Indian Express. "Jujubee", the third single from the album, performed by Dhee, with backing vocals by Anirudh and Anantha Krishnan, released on 26 July 2023.

== Track listing ==
Tamil
No.	Title	Lyrics	Singer(s)	Length
1.	"Kaavaalaa"	Arunraja Kamaraj	Shilpa Rao	3:10
2.	"Rathamaarey"	Vignesh Shivan	Vishal Mishra	4:12
3.	"Hukum – Thalaivar Alappara"	Super Subu	Anirudh Ravichander, Rajinikanth (Note: For dialogues)	3:27
4.	"Jujubee"	Super Subu	Dhee, Anantha Krishnan, Anirudh Ravichander	2:47
5.	"Muthuvel Pandian Theme" (Instrumental)	—	—	1:42
6.	"Jailer Theme" (Instrumental)	—	—	1:02
7.	"Jailer Drill Theme" (Instrumental)	—	—	0:43
8.	"Alappara Theme" (Instrumental)	—	—	1:17
Total length:				18:20

Telugu
No.	Title	Lyrics	Singer(s)	Length
1.	"Kaavaali"	Sri Sai Kiran	Sindhuja Srinivasan	3:10
2.	"Hukum"	Bhaskarabhatla	Anirudh Ravichander, Dinker Kalvala	3:27
3.	"Bandhamele"	Krishna Kanth	P V N S Rohit	4:12
4.	"Jujubee"	Srinivasa Mouli	Anirudh Ravichander, Sahithi Chaganti, Anantha Krishnan	2:47
5.	"Muthuvel Pandian Theme" (Instrumental)	—	—	1:42
6.	"Jailer Theme" (Instrumental)	—	—	1:02
7.	"Jailer Drill Theme" (Instrumental)	—	—	0:43
Total length:				17:06

Malayalam
No.	Title	Lyrics	Singer(s)	Length
1.	"Kaavaalaa"	Deepak Ram	Sindhuja Srinivasan	3:10
2.	"Hukum"	Deepak Ram	Arjun Vijay	3:27
3.	"Vennilavin"	Deepak Ram	P V N S Rohit	4:12
4.	"Jujubee"	Deepak Ram	Anirudh Ravichander, Sahithi Chaganti, Anantha Krishnan	2:47
5.	"Muthuvel Pandian Theme" (Instrumental)	—	—	1:42
6.	"Jailer Theme" (Instrumental)	—	—	1:02
7.	"Jailer Drill Theme" (Instrumental)	—	—	0:43
Total length:				17:06

Kannada
No.	Title	Lyrics	Singer(s)	Length
1.	"Kaavaalaayya"	Varadaraj Chikkaballapura	Sindhuja Srinivasan	3:10
2.	"Hukum"	Varadaraj Chikkaballapura	Lokeshwar Edara	3:27
3.	"Bandhamele"	Varadaraj Chikkaballapura	P V N S Rohit	4:12
4.	"Jujubee"	Varadaraj Chikkaballapura	Anirudh Ravichander, Sahithi Chaganti, Anantha Krishnan	2:47
5.	"Muthuvel Pandian Theme" (Instrumental)	—	—	1:42
6.	"Jailer Theme" (Instrumental)	—	—	1:02
7.	"Jailer Drill Theme" (Instrumental)	—	—	0:43
Total length:				17:06

Hindi
No.	Title	Lyrics	Singer(s)	Length
1.	"Tu Aa Dilbara"	Raqueeb Alam	Sindhuja Srinivasan	3:10
2.	"Hukum"	Raqueeb Alam	Ritesh G. Rao	3:27
3.	"Tu Mera Hai"	Raqueeb Alam	P V N S Rohit	4:12
4.	"Jujubee"	Raqueeb Alam	Anirudh Ravichander, Sahithi Chaganti, Anantha Krishnan	2:47
5.	"Muthuvel Pandian Theme" (Instrumental)	—	—	1:42
6.	"Jailer Theme" (Instrumental)	—	—	1:02
7.	"Jailer Drill Theme" (Instrumental)	—	—	0:43
Total length:				17:06

== Background Score ==
After the film's release, additional 5 tracks were revealed.

No.	Title	Singer(s)	Length
1.	"Tiger Transformation" (Instrumental)	Anirudh Ravichander	4:25
2.	"Feel of Jailer" (Instrumental)	Vishal Mishra	3:10
3.	"Mathew Theme" (Instrumental)	—	2:10
4.	"Narasimha Theme" (Instrumental)	—	0:58
5.	"Varman Theme" (Instrumental)	—	1:20
Total length:			12:33

== Reception ==
Siddharth Srinivas of Only Kollywood gave 3.25 stars out of five and wrote "Jailer is a soundtrack that is not upto the best of Anirudh, but still works well thanks to the high-voltage elevation themes that he brings in." Meera Venugopal of Radio Mirchi called the album as a "tribute to the superstar". M Suganth, in his review for The Times of India complimented the background score "elevating the film", but criticized the songs as "average". Gopinath Rajendran of The Hindu praised the music as a "banger". Kirubakar Purushothaman of The Indian Express said that Anirudh's music provides "thrust to an already speeding train". Janani K of India Today felt that Anirudh "acts as a solid pillar of support for the film. His thumping background score will make you enjoy Rajinikanth’s swag." Bharathy Singaravel of The News Minute wrote "Anirudh is clearly the music composer to go to for a lavish dose of theatrics in a film that’s already bursting at the seams with what millennials will describe as being 'extra'. While such an approach can easily misfire, in Jailer, it comes together fluidly." Pratikshya Mishra of The Quint felt that the song "Hukum" works as a "powerful leit motif that scores some of the film’s most effective scenes".

== See also ==
- Jailer 2 (soundtrack)
