= Hukum – Thalaivar Alappara =

- Official single cover

Single by Anirudh Ravichander

from the album Jailer
- Language: Tamil
- Released: 17 July 2023
- Recorded: May 2023
- Studio: Albuquerque Records, Chennai
- Genre: Filmi
- Length: 3:27
- Label: Sun Pictures
- Composer: Anirudh Ravichander
- Lyricist: Super Subu
- Producer: Anirudh Ravichander

Jailer track listing
- 1. "Kaavaalaa"; 2. "Jailer Theme"; 3. "Rathamaarey"; 4. "Muthuvel Pandian Theme"; 5. "Hukum – Thalaivar Alappara"; 6. "Jailer Drill"; 7. "Jujubee"; 8. "Alappara Theme"

Music video
- "Hukum – Thalaivar Alappara" on YouTube

"Hukum – Thalaivar Alappara" (transl. Order - Leader's Rampage) (Note: In Tamil word, Thalaivar also refers to actor Rajinikanth.) or simply "Hukum" is a Tamil-language song composed and sung by Anirudh Ravichander and written by Super Subu, for the soundtrack album of the 2023 film Jailer. The film, directed by Nelson Dilipkumar and produced by Sun Pictures, starred Rajinikanth. The song was released on 17 July 2023 as the second single from the album.

"Hukum" was conceived as a fan anthem for Rajinikanth. Upon release, it became a pop-culture phenomenon with fans posting edits for sports and film favorites. The song peaked as the number three on Billboard India Songs and other national charts in music and video platforms. Super Subu won the Best Lyricist award at the 3rd IIFA Utsavam.

== Context ==
In the film, the song appears in two instances: one in the post-interval sequence after Muthuvel Pandian (Rajinikanth) comes to Varman's (Vinayakan) place to confront and kill him, and the other, in a much-hyped sequence that featured Muthuvel, Matthew (Mohanlal) and Narasimha (Shiva Rajkumar). Anirudh added that because of the word "hukum" (transl. command), Anirudh wanted to use the song in that sequence, which worked perfectly.

== Composition and lyrics ==
Anirudh contacted his classmate and fellow lyricist Super Subu to write the song, as the latter was a fan of Rajinikanth. He was recommended by the director Nelson and studio executives, for his contribution to the film. As Nelson was busy on the film's production, Anirudh told the briefing of the song to Subu and where the song would appear in the film. He instructed Subu to write the song as a "mass number". Subu then wrote the lyrics of the song from a third-person's perspective as he wanted to conceptualize it as a fan anthem. The lyrics for the song were written within two hours. The war horn-sound which opens the theme was produced by Anirudh through vocals, which he amplified with sound effects for the final version.

== Marketing and release ==
"Hukum – Thalaivar Alappara" was announced on 13 July and set to be released as the second single from the album. A teaser of the song was released on 15 July, and the full song was released on 17 July. The song was released in Telugu, Hindi and Kannada as "Hukum" on 30, 31 July and 9 August. Actor Venkatesh launched the Telugu version through his social media platforms.

== Reception ==
Meera Venugopal of Radio Mirchi reviewed the song as "the song is about a man who is the boss and controls how things work and needless to say, we get to see a super stylish Thalaivar in Hukum". The Indian Express described the song as "an ode to Superstar's swag".

== Controversy ==
The song met with criticism from a section of fans over its lyrics, that allegedly targeted other actors. In response to this, lyricist Subu refuted them as untrue and he wrote the lyrics on the admiration for the fan.

== Impact ==
Following its release, the song's popularity led to numerous fan edits and tributes in sports and other pop culture. Alagappan Muthu, writer of Cricinfo, covered the Chennai Super Kings match against Kolkata Knight Riders on 8 April at M. A. Chidambaram Stadium, Chennai that mentioned the song being played upon MS Dhoni's arrival at the stadium and the lyrics apparently referenced on Dhoni, as a token of admiration by the fans. The football club Manchester City F.C. posted an Instagram reel, mentioning the song and the popular dialogue as a tribute to the actor.

Composer Anirudh announced Hukum World Tour for 2024–2025, banking on the success of the song. Additionally, his newly established clothing brand "Piece of Rock" launched T-shirts under the tagline "Hukum" for the tour. The introductory dialogue "inga naan thaan kingu" (transl. I am the only king here) spoken by Rajinikanth in the film and its song, inspired another film to have the same dialogue as title, starring Santhanam and Priyalaya. The sequel to Jailer was given the tentative title Hukum.

== Credits ==
- Anirudh Ravichander – singer, composer, producer, musical arrangements, keyboard, synth and rhythm programming
- Super Subu – lyrics
- Yogi Sekar – backing vocals
- Velu K – backing vocals
- Adithya RK – backing vocals
- Ravi G – backing vocals
- Ananthakrrishnan – backing vocals, music advisor
- Shashank Vijay – rhythm production
- Kalyan – additional rhythm programming
- IC – additional keyboard programming
- Arish-Pradeep PJ – additional keyboard programming
- Sajith Satya – creative consultant
- Srinivasan M – recording, mixing and mastering
- Shivakaran S – recording
- Vinay Sridhar – mixing and mastering
- Velavan B – music co-ordinator

== Chart performance ==
Chart	Peak position
India (Billboard) ("Kaavaalaa")	3
Asian Music Chart (OCC) ("Kaavaalaa")	6

== Awards and nominations ==
Award	Date of ceremony	Category	Recipient(s) and nominee(s)	Result	Ref.
Ananda Vikatan Cinema Awards	22 June 2024	Best Male Playback Singer	Anirudh Ravichander	Nominated	
Ananda Vikatan Cinema Awards	22 June 2024	Best Lyricist	Super Subu	Nominated	
Filmfare Awards South	3 August 2024	Best Male Playback Singer – Tamil	Anirudh Ravichander	Nominated	
IIFA Utsavam	27 September 2024	Best Lyricist	Super Subu	Nominated	
