= Jailer (2023 Tamil film) =

Indian film by Nelson Dilipkumar

- Theatrical release poster
- Directed by: Nelson Dilipkumar
- Written by: Nelson Dilipkumar
- Produced by: Kalanithi Maran
- Starring: Rajinikanth; Ramya Krishnan; Vinayakan; Tamannaah Bhatia; Sunil; Vasanth Ravi; Yogi Babu; Mirnaa
- Cinematography: Vijay Kartik Kannan
- Edited by: R. Nirmal
- Music by: Anirudh Ravichander
- Production company: Sun Pictures
- Distributed by: see below
- Release date: 10 August 2023
- Running time: 165 minutes
- Country: India
- Language: Tamil
- Budget: ₹200–220 crore
- Box office: est. ₹605–650 crore (Note: According to India Today, Jailer grossed ₹605 crore worldwide and Hindustan Times reported ₹610 crore while Firstpost and Cinema Express stated that the film grossed ₹650 crore worldwide.)

Jailer is a 2023 Indian Tamil-language action comedy film written and directed by Nelson Dilipkumar. Produced by Kalanithi Maran under Sun Pictures, the film stars Rajinikanth as a retired jailer who sets out to apprehend an eccentric idol smuggler threatening his family. The cast also includes Ramya Krishnan, Vinayakan, Tamannaah Bhatia, Sunil, Vasanth Ravi, Yogi Babu and Mirnaa in supporting roles. Mohanlal, Shiva Rajkumar, Makarand Deshpande and Jackie Shroff play guest appearances.

The film was officially announced in February 2022 under the working title Thalaivar 169, being the 169th film of Rajinikanth, while the official title was announced in June that year. Principal photography commenced in August 2022 in Chennai followed with schedules in Cuddalore, Hyderabad, Jaisalmer, Mangalore, Kerala and wrapped by early-June 2023. The music is composed by Anirudh Ravichander, with cinematography handled by Vijay Kartik Kannan and edited by R. Nirmal.

Jailer was released theatrically on 10 August 2023. The film received positive reviews from critics and emerged as the highest-grossing Tamil film of 2023, sixth highest-grossing Indian film of 2023 and third highest-grossing Tamil film of all time. Additionally, the film received four nominations at the Filmfare Awards South, and won two Ananda Vikatan Cinema Awards, two IIFA Utsavam awards including Best Film, and two South Indian International Movie Awards including Best Film and Best Director for Nelson, all in the Tamil branch. The sequel, Jailer 2, was released on 15 October 2026, which was also a major box office success and became the highest grossing Tamil film of all time.

== Plot ==
In Arakkonam, police discover a temple priest murdered with their idol statue stolen and replaced with a fake. However, the police officer on the scene insists that the case be registered solely as a murder, with no mention of the stolen idol. This, it emerges, is not an isolated occurrence. The officer has followed the same approach in 15 previous incidents, fearing that acknowledging the theft of temple idols would provoke public protests and potentially escalate into a law-and-order situation.

The scene then shifts to Varman, an eccentric gangster based in Arakkonam who specialises in stealing idol statues and selling them to overseas buyers. Varman is particularly brutal in his methods of execution. He kills his victims with a hammer, often with his henchman Dhanaraj. He also has his men dispose of bodies by dissolving them in drums of sulphuric acid, sometimes while the victims are still alive.

The narrative then shifts to "Tiger" Muthuvel Pandian, who lives in Tamil Nadu with his family. His son, ACP Arjun, is investigating Varman and his criminal activities. As part of the investigation, Arjun intercepts an idol consignment in transit and confronts Varman's henchman, Seenu. In an attempt to recover the stolen idols, Seenu has men kidnap Muthuvel from his home and uses him as leverage to threaten Arjun. However, Arjun tells Seenu and his men that they have made a grave mistake. As it turns out, Muthuvel is more than capable of handling the men sent after him.

Arjun subsequently takes Seenu into police custody and tortures him in an attempt to extract information about Varman's whereabouts. However, after Seenu is released from custody, Arjun mysteriously goes missing. Rather than launch a proper investigation into his disappearance, the police department attempts to cover up the matter by circulating the claim that Arjun may have died by suicide due to the stress of his job.

Devastated by the loss of his son, Muthuvel begins to blame himself for raising Arjun to be so honest and fearless. His grief is further compounded by his wife's harsh words, which add to his sense of guilt. Eventually, Muthuvel decides to take matters into his own hands. He tracks down Seenu and murders him with his kidari aruval, subsequently disposing of the body with the help of Vimal, a clueless local taxi driver whom Muthuvel coerces into assisting him. In retaliation, Varman's men attempt to assassinate Muthuvel's grandson, Rithvik, but Muthuvel manages to save him. Muthuvel then attempts to reason with Varman, asking him to leave his family alone. However, Varman refuses to back down. Realising that his family will remain in danger as long as Varman is alive, Muthuvel decides to fight back.

First, Muthuvel eliminates the two men who attempted to kill Rithvik with his kidari aruval and a knife when he meets them again in a bar. He then blackmails psychiatrist S. Dhandapani into arranging asylum for his family, presenting himself to be suffering from psychological distress in front of them. Muthuvel subsequently travels to Mandya, where he meets Narasimha, a reformed criminal. Narasimha agrees to help him by providing four highly trained snipers. With the assistance of Narasimha's men, Vimal, and intelligence obtained from one of Seenu's former henchmen, Muthuvel manages to intercept and steal Varman's idol consignment while it is being smuggled. Using the stolen idols as leverage, Muthuvel blackmails and humiliates Varman. In a particularly humiliating confrontation, Varman arrives at the asylum armed with a knife, intending to kill Muthuvel's family. However, Muthuvel turns the tables on him, forcing the gangster to beg his family for just ₹10.

Believing the matter to be settled, Muthuvel takes his family back home. However, determined to eliminate Muthuvel, he hires Kamdev, a contract killer from Bihar, to assassinate him at his own residence.Kamdev dispatches his men to carry out the attack. Sensing the impending danger, Muthuvel hides his grandson, Rithvik, and decides to confess the truth about his actions to his wife and daughter-in-law. As the family sits together at the dining table, Muthuvel and Narasimha's snipers begin eliminating the attackers one by one. Vijaya and Swetha watch in terror as the assailants are picked off, while Muthuvel remains remarkably calm. By the end of the attack, all the intruders lie dead.

The following day, upon learning that all his men have been killed and that Varman's actual target is Muthuvel, Kamdev reveals a startling truth about the latter's past. Muthuvel was once the ruthless yet charismatic jailer of Tihar Jail in Delhi. Known for his harsh disciplinary methods, he was equally committed to reforming criminals and helping them turn their lives around. His unique approach earned him the respect and loyalty of numerous former inmates, creating an extensive network of allies across the criminal underworld. Kamdev himself was once among those who benefited from Muthuvel's influence.

Muthuvel eventually tracks down Varman and corners him at his own base, accompanied by a hundred men sent by another former criminal, Sikandar Singh. Varman had mistakenly believed that Sikandar would help him eliminate Muthuvel. However, the tables have turned, and Muthuvel now has Varman surrounded, Muthuvel then beats up Varman and Dhanraj. Just when it appears that Varman has run out of options, as Muthuvel is about to kill him with his kidari aruval, Varman reveals Arjun is still alive and threatens to kill him. Both of them ultimately compromise: Varman will release Arjun in exchange for retrieving a famous antique crown currently secured in a temple in Mangalagiri. Muthuvel agrees to bring the crown, even on the condition that Dhanaraj and Paneer, another subordinate to Varman, would spy on him daily on the way to Hyderabad. Muthuvel plans a heist involving the actor Blast Mohan, a temple trustee, at a temple where the crown is kept. After various deceptions and with the help of a smuggler in Mumbai named Mathew, Muthuvel obtains the crown and delivers it to Varman through Dhanaraj and Paneer without revealing to them that is fake.

Varman frees Arjun, who reveals he had defected to Varman's operations, and is willing to kill his father for money. However, the crown turns out to be fake; it conceals a hidden camera, through which Muthuvel witnesses their entire conversation. Enraged and betrayed, Varman kills Paneer with his hammer when Paneer attempts to stab him after they both find out that the crown was fake through some specialists; Dhanaraj commits suicide by slitting his throat with his knife out of fear of Varman. Varman then reveals the truth to Arjun and they attempt to kill each other, but Varman manages to defeat him whilst Muthuvel armed with a gun raids Varman's hideout with Kamdev, Vimal, and his allies. They kill Varman's men and Muthuvel personally defeats Varman as Varman doesn't put up a fight against Muthuvel knowing that he will not win and threatens to kill Muthuvel's family with his men. Meanwhile Narasimha protects Muthuvel's family with his snipers from Varman's men, and Mathew with his men destroys Varman's smuggling operations. Muthuvel orders one of his men to douse and kill Varman with his own sulfuric acid as Varman taunts Muthuvel about Arjun.

Later, Muthuvel asks Arjun to surrender, but Arjun refuses and attempts to kill him with the gun given to him by Muthuvel for his safety. At Muthuvel's signal, Narasimha's men shoot and kill Arjun while Muthuvel solemnly walks away, discarding his chain with Arjun's milk tooth that he kept as a memento.

== Cast ==
Adapted from the closing credits:

- Rajinikanth as "Tiger" Muthuvel Pandian IPS, a retired jailer
- Ramya Krishnan as Vijaya Pandian, Muthuvel's wife
- Vinayakan as Varman, an eccentric idol smuggler
- Tamannaah Bhatia as Actress Kamna
- Sunil as Actor Blast Mohan
- Vasanth Ravi as ACP Arjun Pandian IPS, Muthuvel's son
- Yogi Babu as Vimal, a taxi driver
- Jaffer Sadiq as Doknath, Narasimha and Muthuvel's henchman
- G. Marimuthu as Panneer, Varman's sidekick and assistant
- VTV Ganesh as Dr. S. Dhandapani
- Redin Kingsley as Divya Nathan
- Sunil Reddy as Bagunnara Balu
- Mirnaa as Swetha Pandian, Arjun's wife and Muthuvel's daughter-in-law
- Rithvik as Rithvik "Rithu" Pandian, Arjun's son and Muthuvel's grandson
- Harshad as Dhanraj, Varman's friend and sidekick
- Saravanan as Seenu
- Aranthangi Nisha as Constable G. Kanagalakshmi
- Mahanadi Shankar as a police constable
- Padam Kumar as Raja Rao
- Karate Karthi as Sanju
- Sugunthan as Narasimha's henchman
- Billy Murali as Panju
- Pavel Mani as Seenu's masseur
- Sooraj Pops as Varman's henchman
- Dancer Ramesh as Varman's henchman

=== Cameo appearances ===
- Mohanlal as Mathew
- Shiva Rajkumar as Narasimha
- Jackie Shroff as Kamdev
- Kishore as Jaffar
- Makarand Deshpande as Sikandar Singh
- Jani Master as himself in the song "Kaavaalaa"
- Nagendra Babu as Balsingh
- Uday Mahesh as a CBI officer

== Production ==
=== Development ===
During the filming of Master (2021) in late-2019, Lokesh Kanagaraj reportedly visited Rajinikanth at his residence in Chennai and discussed for a potential collaboration. The project, becoming Rajinikanth's 169 film was reportedly to be produced by Kamal Haasan's Raaj Kamal Films International. However, the COVID-19 pandemic and Rajinikanth's commitments to Annaatthe (2021) supposedly delayed the launch of the film and Lokesh decided to collaborate with Haasan on Vikram (2022).

In December 2021, Nelson Dilipkumar was reported to direct Rajinikanth's 169 film in his lead role, after finishing his commitments to Beast (2022). In February 2022, an article from The Times of India had reported that the actor had not finalised his next film and stated that the project with Nelson was reported to be false. However, on 10 February 2022, Sun Pictures officially announced that project under the working title Thalaivar 169. This also marks the first collaboration of Nelson with Rajinikanth.

The project was planned to be filmed across various locations within a span of five to six months. Due to the subpar critical reception for Beast where Nelson was criticised for his writing, there were speculations that he was dropped from the project and would be replaced with another director. However, the producers dismissed the rumours and reaffirmed Nelson's involvement in the film. The film's official title Jailer was announced on 17 June 2022. Rajinikanth received a salary of ₹110 crore as an advance prior to the release.

=== Pre-production ===
Nelson began writing the film's script in April 2022 and completed writing the first half within two months. While K. S. Ravikumar was reported to assist Nelson in the scriptwriting, the official poster revealed Nelson as the sole writer, dismissing those reports. Speaking at the Film Companion Directors Adda 2023 roundtable, Nelson felt that one of the main challenges was getting people to accept Rajinikanth playing his age as most of the industry insiders refuted this idea. But Nelson convinced them and also felt being slightly confident at times that it would work. He also added that he spent a month to come up with the idea for the interval sequence, where he would show a cool demeanor and set the character to be more interesting, a contrast from Rajinikanth's films.

"I wanted him to be too cool in that scene. Rather than him fighting, I wanted the things that happened around his character to be more interesting and something that hasn't been done in his earlier films [...] I had these sessions with the fight master where he used to show me a few staging options every day. But I eventually wrote this scene. On the shooting day, many asked me whether this would work. When I told them that there was a little bit of action that he does too, they still felt it wasn't enough for him as he was a big hero. But still, we went with it."

— Nelson Dilipkumar on staging the interval sequence at the Film Companion Directors Adda 2023

Nelson retained the crew members from his previous films, which included cinematographer Vijay Kartik Kannan who worked with him on Doctor (2021), music composer Anirudh Ravichander, editor R. Nirmal, production designer D. R. K. Kiran, action choreographer Stun Siva, dance choreographer Jani Master, costume designers Pallavi Singh and Muthul Hafeez, and publicity designer Kabilan Chelliah. D. Ramesh Kuchirayar was the production controller, and Raja Sridhar and Sembian Sivakumar were the executive producers.

Prior to the commencement of the first schedule, the team constructed a set at the Ramoji Film City in Hyderabad, where major portions were being planned to be predominantly shot there. Test shoots for the film took place in late July 2022 at Chennai. Prominent stylist Aalim Hakim designed the looks and character sketches for Rajinikanth, while Venket Ram photographed the promotional stills.

=== Casting ===
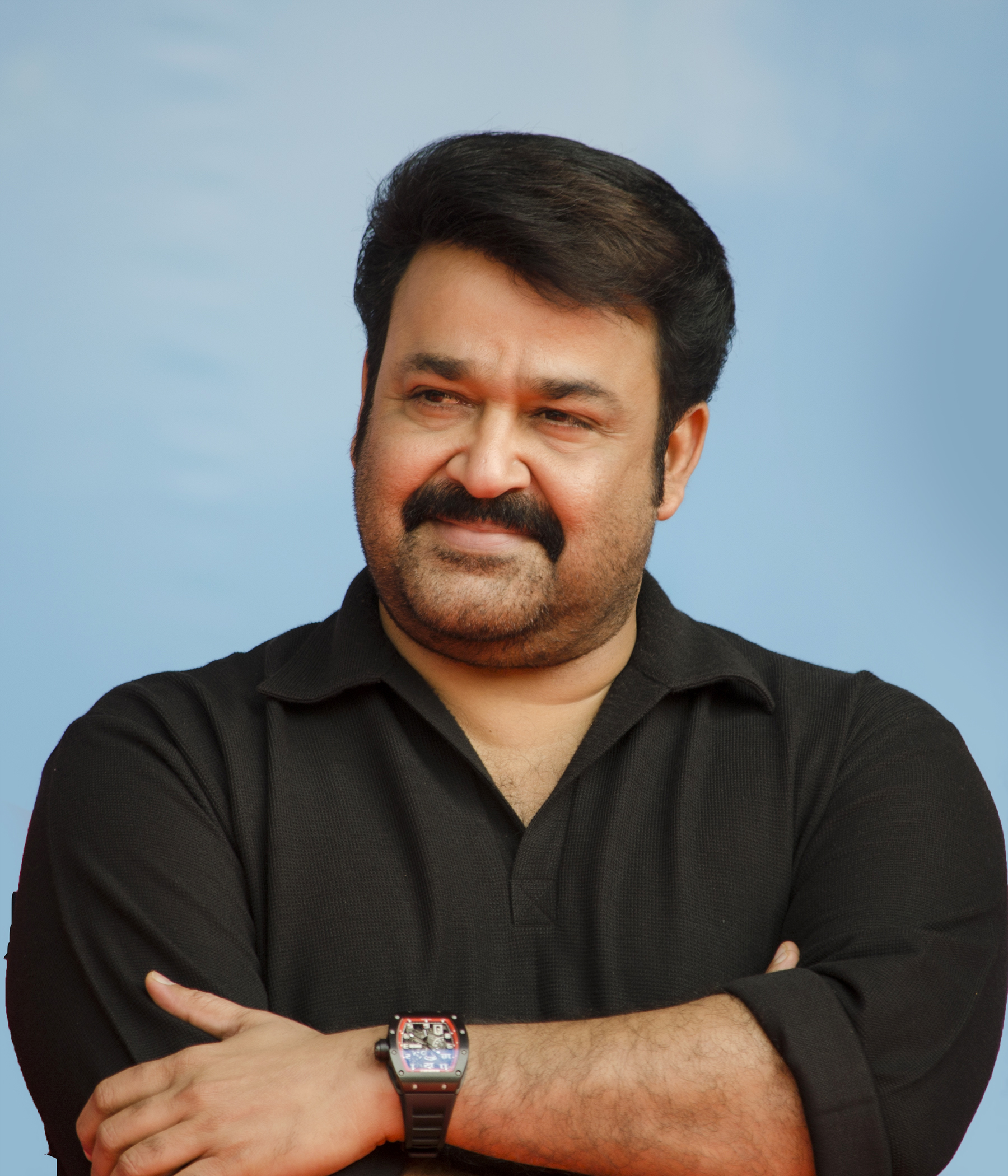
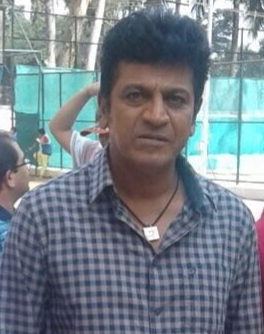
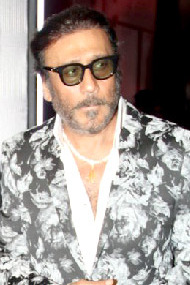
Mohanlal, Shiva Rajkumar and Jackie Shroff were cast in cameo appearances; the film is Shiva's Tamil cinema debut.

In April 2022, Ramya Krishnan was reported to be a part of the film. That May, there were reports suggesting that Kannada actor Shiva Rajkumar would be seen in a pivotal role, before he was officially confirmed as a part of the cast, the following month; It marks Shiva Rajkumar's debut in Tamil cinema. That June month, Redin Kingsley who acted in Nelson's previous films speculated on being involved in the film, but undisclosed on which role he would play, before he was officially a part of the cast.

In early August, Vasanth Ravi was confirmed to be part of the film. The same month, Krishnan confirmed her participation, reuniting with Rajinikanth after 24 years since Padayappa (1999). She recalled her experiences on working with the actor on Padayappa, and she disclosed that her character's name does not recall her name Neelambari from the film, adding "Don't come in expecting a Padayappa-Neelambari romance; these are two different characters, but Nelson has definitely managed to create a new kind of magic with them." Yogi Babu was reported to play a role in the film which was confirmed by the production house on late-August.

Malayalam actor Vinayakan was cast as the film's main antagonist Varman. Vasanth Ravi recalled that Mammootty was the original choice for Varman, but the team felt that the character would not suit the actor's stature; they ultimately decided against casting him. Mirnaa Menon was cast as Vasanth Ravi's wife, and said she had "no second thoughts" about doing the film. Harish Roy was initially offered a role in the film but refused it due to health issues. On 6 January 2023, it was announced that Mohanlal would be acting in the film in a cameo role. Almost two weeks later, Sunil and Tamannaah Bhatia were announced as part of the cast for brief roles. In February 2023, Jackie Shroff was announced to be a part of the film. While Sivakarthikeyan was speculated to play a role in the film, the actor confirmed that he was never approached.

On 4 May 2023, a video that revealed the film's official release date was unveiled which revealed the remaining cast members: Nagendra Babu, Jaffer Sadiq, Kishore, Billy Muralee, Sugunthan, Karate Karthi, Arshad, G. Marimuthu, Rithvik, Saravanan, Aranthangi Nisha, Mahanadi Shankar and Makarand Deshpande amongst others.

=== Filming ===
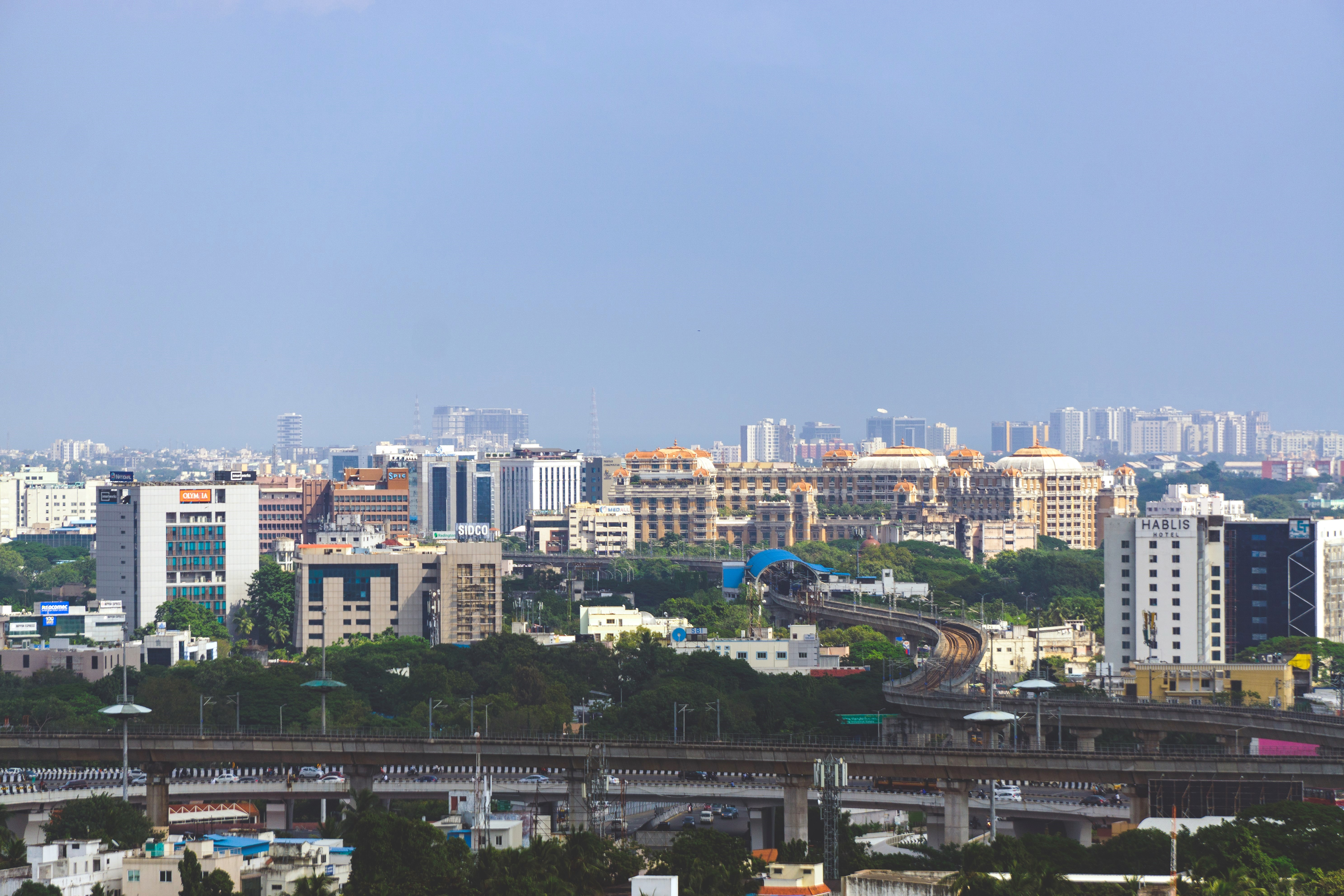
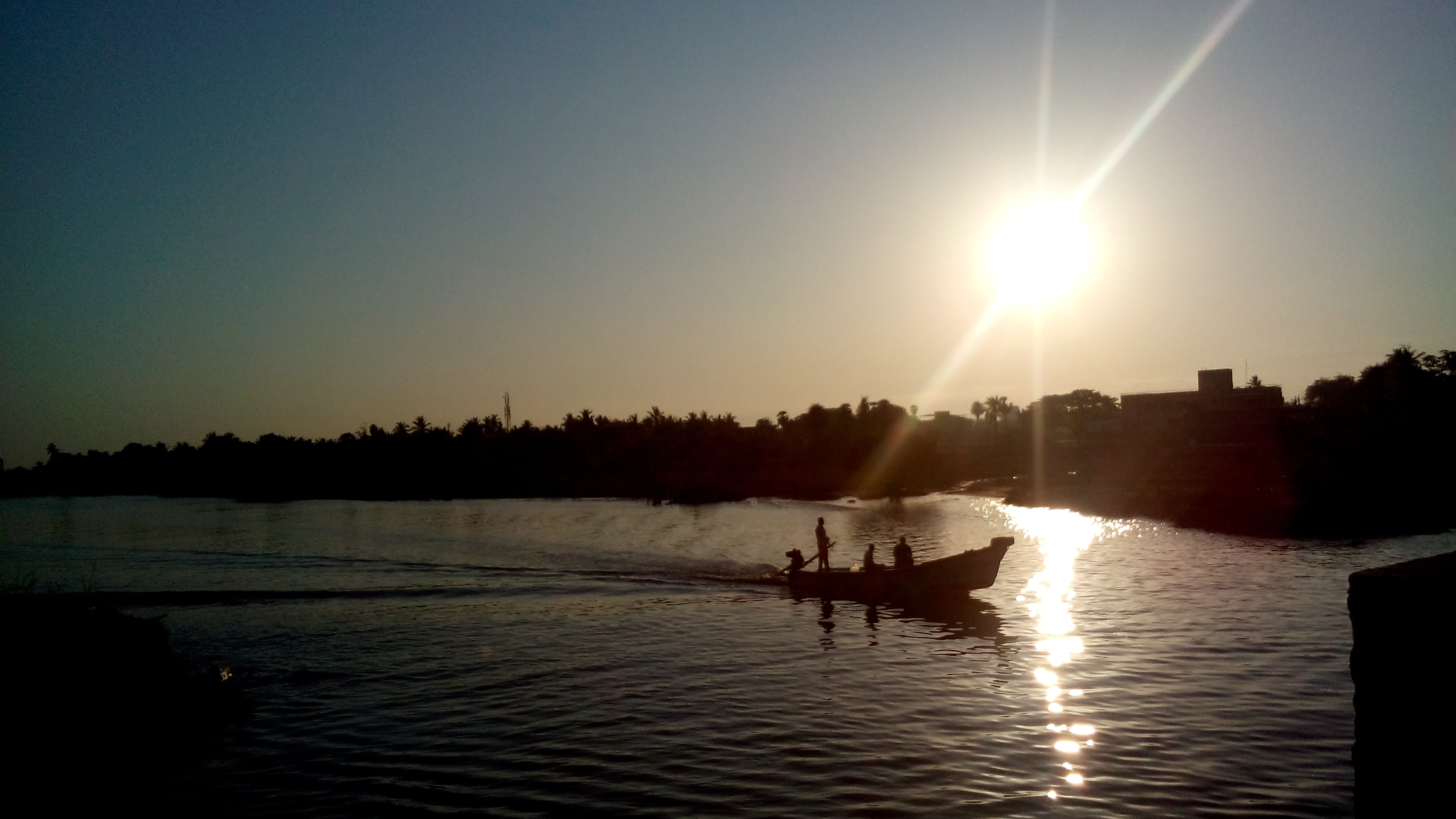
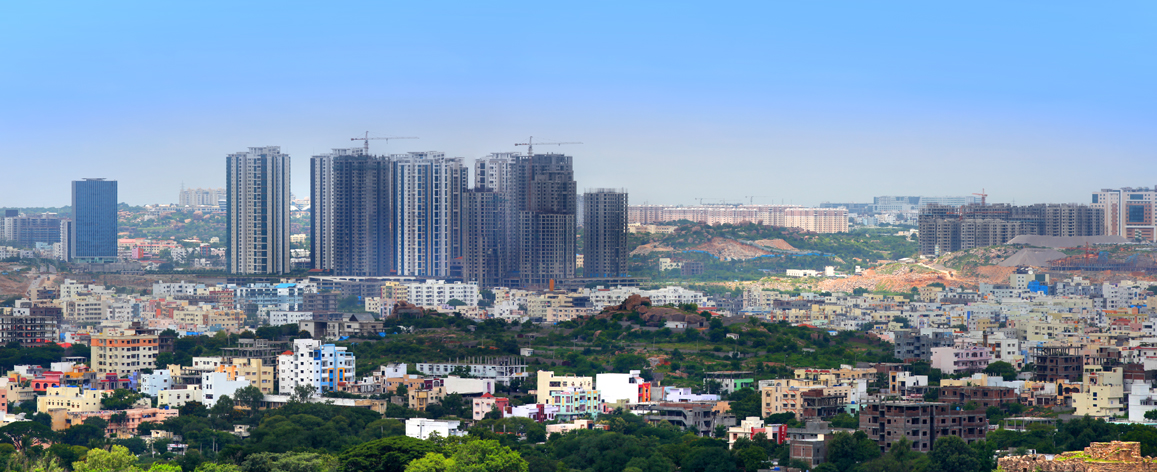
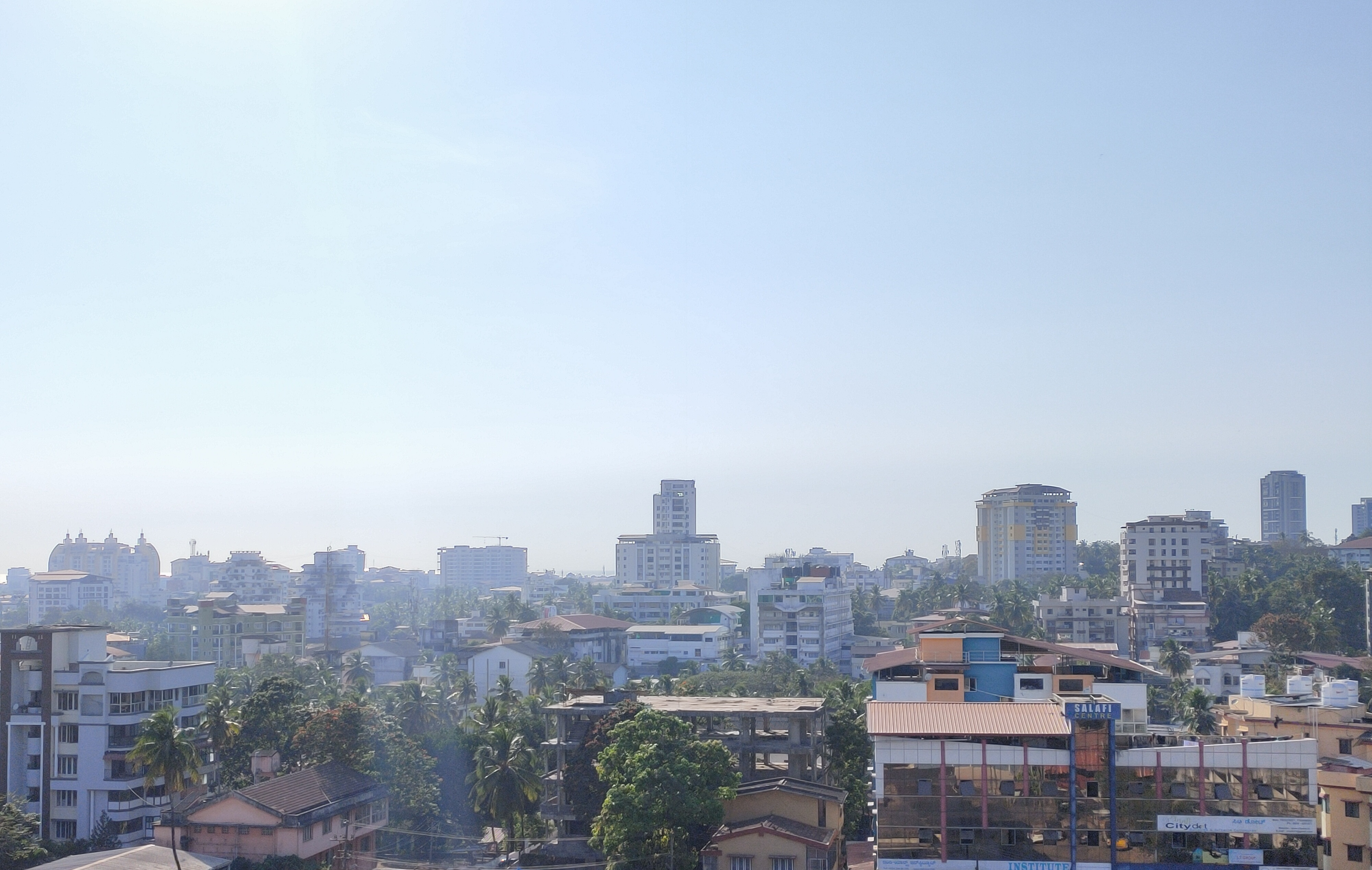
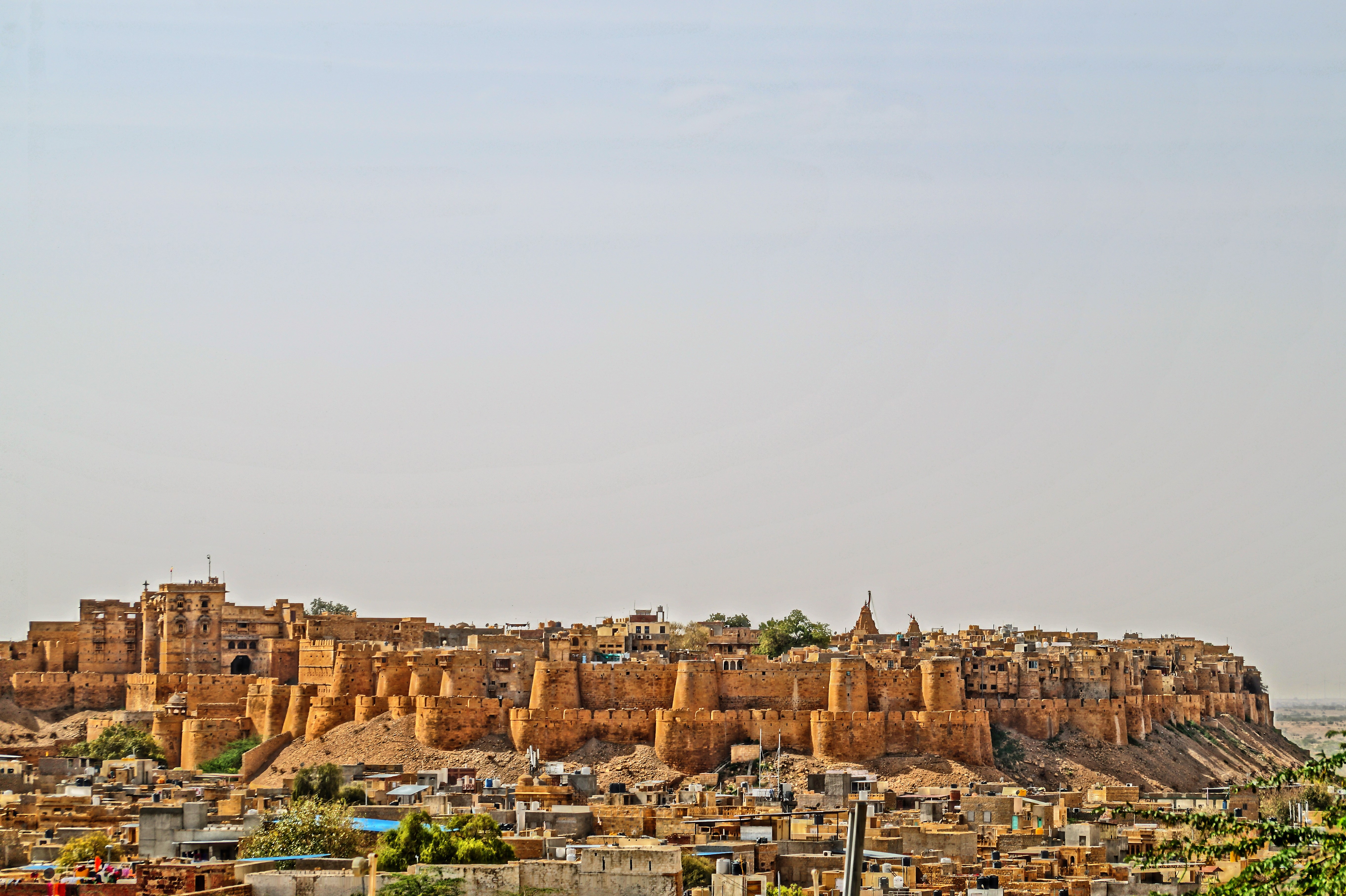
The film was predominantly shot in Chennai, Cuddalore, Hyderabad, Mangalore and Jaisalmer

Principal photography was initially intended to commence on 3 August in Hyderabad. However, the launch of the film was indefinitely delayed due to a strike in Hyderabad which was expected to last at least three weeks. Filming ultimately began on 22 August in Chennai. A special set resembling a police station was constructed in a film city in Chennai where few sequences intended to be shot there. According to cinematographer Vijay Kartik Kannan, a set that resembling houses from the 1990s was constructed for the principal character's household and where most of the film's first half is set. The month-long schedule for the film was completed in Chennai on late September. Afterwards, the team moved to Cuddalore for filming a brief schedule with Rajinikanth and Babu.

By November 2022, 50 percent of the film had been completed with three action sequences to be shot under the supervision of action director Stun Siva. On that month, Shivarajkumar joined the film's shooting schedule where he would shoot for his portions within 4–5 days. The team then moved to Chennai, for filming crucial sequences at the Adityaram Studios in Chennai. After a brief break, in January 2023, the team headed to Hyderabad for filming a major schedule with Rajinikanth and the ensemble cast. At the end of the month, the team moved to Jaisalmer for filming an action sequence which continued for 10 days. Shortly afterwards, the team moved to Mangalore for a brief schedule with Shivarajkumar also participating. A major sequence featuring Rajinikanth, Shivarajkumar and Sadiq was filmed at the Pilikulaj Gutthu, which was prominent for filming Kantara (2022). This schedule concluded on 22 February 2023.

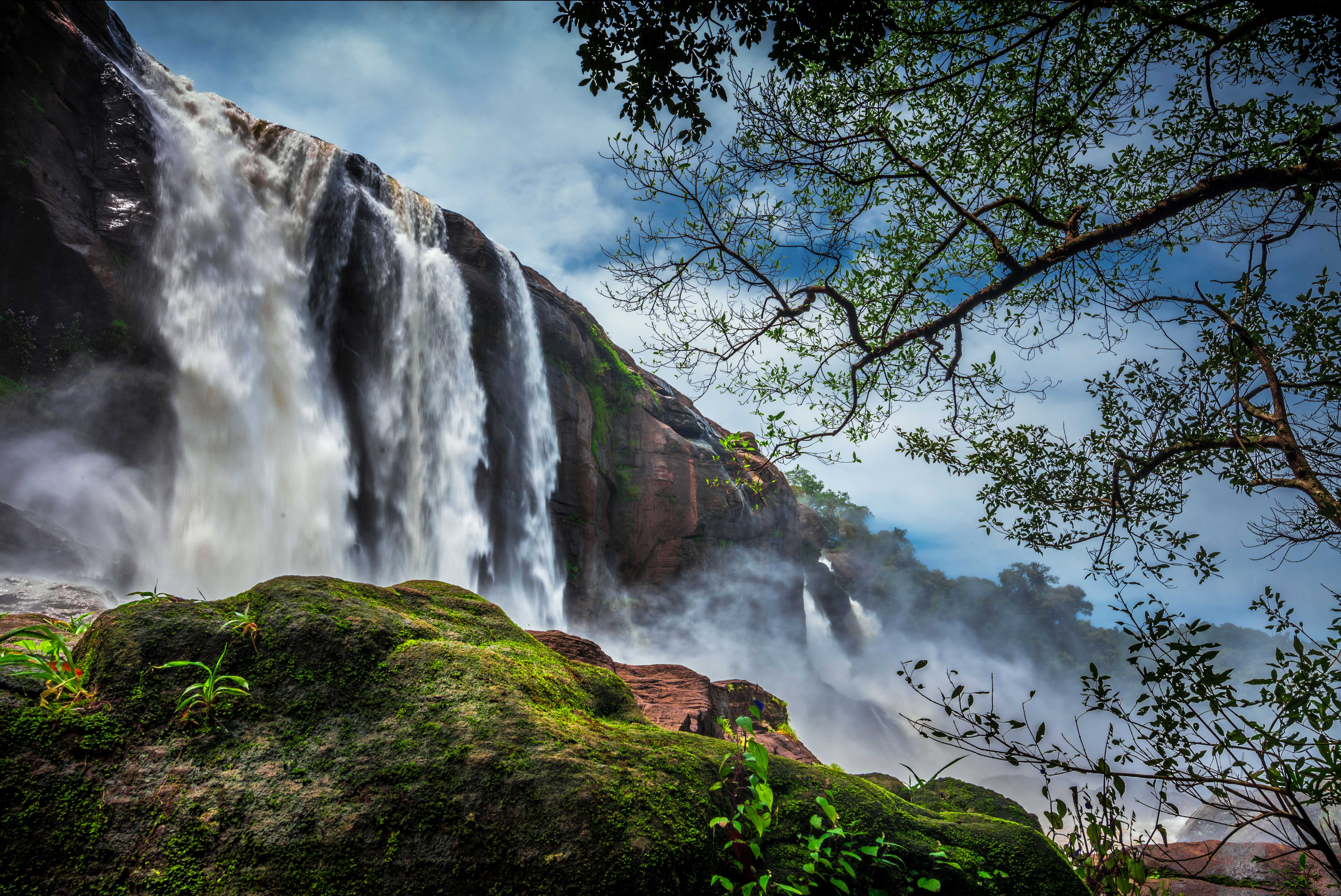
The climax of Jailer was shot at Athirappilly Falls.

A week later, the team commenced filming a major action sequence in Chennai in March 2023. By the end of the month, it was reported that only 15 days of shooting is to be completed, with scenes featuring Rajinikanth to be canned within 10 days. The climax of the film was shot at Athirappilly Falls, Chalakudy in Kerala. While Rajinikanth had completed his portions during mid-April 2023, he however returned for a short schedule which was set to be filmed during late-May 2023. The song "Kaavaalaa" was filmed at this schedule featuring Bhatia and Rajinikanth, amongst others, and was completed on 1 June 2023, which meant that principal photography has been wrapped.

=== Post-production ===
Post-production began on mid-June 2023, with Vinayakan dubbing his portions for the film first. Shivarajkumar dubbed for his portions in Tamil-language, the first time he did so. Rajinikanth then dubbed for his portions, after his commitments for filming Lal Salaam (2024). Anirudh began re-recording the film's background score during mid-July 2023.

The film was sent to the Central Board of Film Certification (CBFC) in late-July 2023, with a runtime of 169 minutes. According to editor Nirmal, the film had an additional few seconds of Rajinikanth smoking a cigar in the climax sequence and the camera was aimed close to the actor holding the cigarette but had to be edited from the film adhering with the CBFC's guidelines.

== Themes and influences ==
Vijay Kartik Kannan, who was an ardent fan of the actor, had said that he wanted to show Rajinikanth from the 1990s, from Annaamalai (1992), Baashha, and Muthu (both 1995), which he described as the "peak Rajini era". The tight close-up sequences in the film were inspired from the scenes were framed in the emotional scenes in Baashha, recalling a sequence where Muthuvel learns about the death of Arjun and the camera keeps zooming until the viewers see a single tear drop from his eye. Vijay also noted that the lighting in the cigar scene during the climax was an homage to Annaamalai. Nelson also cited Baashha as a reference for that particular scene.

According to Anand Kumar RS of The News Minute, the film followed a usual template "rags to riches" of earlier Rajinikanth's films, with a slight twist that diverted the film to the "rogue to restrained to rogue template" in Baashha, but noted that Nelson had seen to bring few novelties such as Rajinikanth playing his age, and having no cliched commercial elements. Kumar also noted on how Rajinikanth "finally going the Amitabh Bachchan way in terms of choosing his films which his critics and well-wishers suggested", referring to Bachchan's transitions from leading role to supporting roles in the later stage of his career, adding "Considering the huge financial stakes riding on a ‘Rajini padam’ in Tamil Nadu, it may not yet be viable for Rajini to follow Amitabh's model. However, he may do well to gradually adopt the model for which the first step has been attempted with Jailer."

The film was noted to have similarities with the Kamal Haasan-starrer Vikram (2022) in the plot and treatment, as noted by Kirubhakar Purushothaman of The Indian Express and Nandini Ramnath of Scroll.in.

== Music ==
The music is composed by Anirudh Ravichander in his third collaboration with Rajinikanth, after Petta (2019) and Darbar (2020) and fourth collaboration with Nelson after Kolamaavu Kokila (2018), Doctor (2021), and Beast (2022). The first single titled "Kaavaalaa" was released on 6 July 2023. The second single titled "Hukum – Thalaivar Alappara" was released on 17 July 2023. The third single titled "Jujubee" was released on 26 July 2023. The album featuring 8 tracks was released on 28 July 2023, at the audio launch event held at Jawarhalal Nehru Indoor Stadium in Chennai.

== Marketing ==
The film's first look poster was released on 22 August 2022. On 17 November, a behind-the-scenes video that documented the film's production was released through the production house's social media handles. On 12 December, coinciding Rajinikanth's birthday, the makers released a teaser that introduced Rajinikanth's character Muthuvel Pandian. A critic from Film Companion South noted that "the video oozes vintage Rajinikanth eccentricities, including his signature sitting pose in silhouette, his characteristic walk and the superstar name card. And just when we think Muthuvel Pandian, a bespectacled middle-aged jailer, is like any other person going about his routine, he takes out a sickle from the dark, indicating that we're up for some explosive action." The film's release date was announced with a teaser that revealed the film's supporting cast on 4 May 2023.

Following the release of the song "Kaavaalaa" on 6 July, the hook step performed by Bhatia in the song went viral on social media which resulted in numerous recreations. The song, along with "Hukum – Thalaivar Alappara" and Rajinikanth's speech at the film's audio launch added to the film's hype, as opined by theatre owners. On 2 August 2023, the film's trailer subtitled Jailer Showcase was released. Reviewing the trailer, Filmfare stated that "The swag-filled Jailer showcase features Rajinikanth in an intense avatar as he fights off bad guys and gets into action". Richa Mukherjee of NDTV stated "We are no stranger to the superstar's impeccable acting skills, but the trailer gives us glimpses of him engaging in some stunts, leaving us in awe." However, the absence of Tamannaah, Mohanlal and Shiva Rajkumar in the trailer had been noted by fans.

Two days later, the trailer was screened at the Times Square in Manhattan, New York. A limited-edition bottle featuring the stills from the film was unveiled by the packaged water company Bisleri.

== Release ==
=== Theatrical ===
Jailer released theatrically on 10 August 2023. The film was originally scheduled to be released in April 2023 but was moved to its current date due to the delay in production. Initially, the film's Hindi-dubbed version was not to be released in theatres following the underperformance of the Tamil films in North India, while it also clashed with Gadar 2 and OMG 2, on the same weekend. But the Hindi version was released in limited theatres.

=== Screenings and statistics ===
The film was showcased around 7000 screens across the world, with 4000 screens in India and 3000 in overseas regions. Worldwide the film sold 9 lakh tickets at the ticketing website BookMyShow, beating Gadar 2 and OMG 2 which respectively sold 3 and 1.3 lakh tickets. According to Ashish Saksena, COO of BookMyShow, it amassed nearly ₹21 crore (US$2.2 million) from the advanced bookings.

The film opened in 800 screens across Tamil Nadu and registered a 78.62% occupancy in India. Tamil Nadu Theatre and Multiplex Owners' Association president, Tiruppur Subramaniam, stated that the advanced bookings of the film was much better in comparison to his previous films, but cannot be compared to that of Kabali (2016) which registered record advances before the release. The film was not given early morning shows in Tamil Nadu, with the first show starting at 9:00 A.M.

Jailer also registered a record release for a Tamil film in Karnataka, being premiered at 300 screens and special shows set at 6:00 A.M. With 5–6 shows per day, theatres across Karnataka would premiere around 2500 shows. The film premiered at 300 shows across Kerala. The film was also showcased around 2000 theatres across Andhra Pradesh and Telangana, despite being released along with Bhola Shankar. The film was not screened at the national multiplex chains across North India (PVR INOX and Cinépolis) due to a new clause that permits screening of dubbed Hindi versions that had an eight-week OTT window.

=== Distribution ===
The film made ₹123 crore (US$13 million) from its theatrical rights before release, with ₹91 crore (US$9.7 million) across India and ₹32 crore (US$3.4 million) from overseas. The film's Tamil Nadu theatrical rights were acquired by Red Giant Movies for ₹60 crore (US$6.4 million) which released the film on its own. The Kerala distribution rights were bought by Gokulam Gopalan's Sree Gokulam Movies for ₹5.5 crore (US$590,000), and Karnataka theatrical rights were acquired by Jayanna Combines for ₹10 crore (US$1.1 million). Andhra Pradesh and Telangana theatrical rights were bought by Asian Cinemas for ₹12 crore (US$1.3 million), while the overseas rights were acquired by Ayngaran International. The rest of India rights were valued up to ₹4 crore (US$430,000). The film was released by MCC Group in Sri Lanka.

=== Home media ===
The film began streaming on Amazon Prime Video and Sun NXT from 7 September 2023. The film's television premiere took place on Sun TV on the occasion of Diwali, 12 November 2023.

=== Controversies ===
In July 2023, director Sakkir Madathil claimed he had registered the title Jailer first for his Malayalam film with the Kerala Film Chamber of Commerce (KFCC) in 2021. He requested producer Kalanithi Maran to change the film's title. Subsequently, the director escalated the issue to court, filing a legal complaint against Sun Pictures for using the same title. Nonetheless, both films were released under the same title in the same month.

In August 2023, the Delhi High Court ordered the makers to edit or alter scenes depicting a contract killer wearing a Royal Challengers Bangalore jersey and making misogynistic comments, following a plea filed by Royal Challengers Sports Private Limited. The makers complied with the demands, ensuring that the digitally altered version would be used for all theatrical, television, satellite and streaming releases starting from 1 September 2023.

== Reception ==
=== Critical response ===
Jailer received positive reviews from critics. On the review aggregator website Rotten Tomatoes, 50% of 8 critics' reviews are positive, with an average rating of 6.7/10.

Simon Abrams of RogerEbert.com wrote: "Jailer simultaneously is and isn't a typical Rajinikanth vehicle. It's more self-conscious and more committed than some of his other recent vehicles, as far as reconciling the tonal whiplash banked into the Indian cinema's kitchen sink, mass-audience-minded masala style." Sruthi Ganapathy Raman of Film Companion South wrote "the most exciting part about Jailer is its exploration of how far Muthuvel will go to preserve his sense of justice. We wish this wistful side of Rajinikanth — that comes quite late and fleetingly— could’ve been explored with some more time. But that's not the film Jailer wants to be. It is the kind of film that quite happily declares to us that whatever type of dinosaur Rajinikanth may be, he is never the type to get extinct."

Kirubhakar Purushothaman of The Indian Express rated three-and-a-half out of five and wrote "[the] Nelson Dilipkumar film is Rajinikanth's version of Kamal Haasan's Vikram, but with a twist. Saying that doesn't take away anything from this fun-filled entertainer." Divya Nair of Rediff rated the film three-and-a-half out of five and stated that "Jailer is carefully written for the theatre audience who should ideally whistle or hoot during the key moments of the film or simply attempt to complete the punch dialogues during the calculated pauses to fully elevate its entertainment value." Manoj Kumar of OTTPlay also gave the same rating and wrote "Jailer is a highly entertaining crowd-pleaser. Nothing path-breaking but it is sure to become an enjoyable delight for the masses."

Gopinath Rajendran of The Hindu wrote "Jailer might be far from perfect, but with the towering presence of Rajinikanth standing tall along with Nelson's fortified writing, this is a commendable comeback for both the actor and filmmaker." Sidharth MP of WION wrote that "Jailer is an entertaining film that offers glimpses of the vintage Rajini and the contemporary Rajini, ably assisted by cameos by Mohanlal, Jackie Shroff and Shiva Rajkumar." Sridevi S of The Times of India rated three out of five and wrote "[Nelson] is back with his signature style of filmmaking—packed with subtle, dark comedy in the first half [...] Second half takes off well with several mass scenes, especially when the story goes back in time to show a glimpse of Muthuvel's past but quickly loses steam and ends up leading towards a dragged, albeit a bit boring and a disappointing climax." Janani K of India Today also rated three out of five and wrote: "Jailer is a film that celebrates Rajinikanth for what he is. There are sparks of Nelson's intelligence in Jailer which makes it quite enjoyable." Pratikshya Mishra of The Quint also gave the same rating and wrote "Without Rajinikanth, Jailer might not have had the same magnetism as it does but since the star is on screen, flicking his shades and throwing lighters in the air, it's a whole different story."

Priyanka Sundar of Firstpost gave the same rating and wrote "One of the most memorable things about Nelson's directorial Jailer, starring Rajinikanth, is the fact that the superstar doesn't get into a zone where he performs unbelievable action sequences". Bharathy Singaravel of The News Minute wrote "Jailer is an undiluted adrenaline rush for the diehard Rajini fan. The star brings his trademark larger-than-life mannerisms into Nelson's quirky storytelling: a combination that works like a perfect charm." Saibal Chatterjee of NDTV rated two-and-a-half out of five and wrote "Jailer does intermittently have you in its grip because Rajinikanth has it in to whip up a storm even at half tilt." Nandini Ramnath of Scroll.in wrote "The slickly filmed Jailer has some sharp scenes of crackpot humour and a few quirky types that salvage an increasingly dull homage to Rajinikanth's screen persona."

=== Box office ===
On its opening day, Jailer grossed an estimated ₹95 crore (US$10 million) worldwide of which ₹52 crore (US$5.6 million) was from India. The opening day grosses were ₹23 crore (US$2.5 million) in Tamil Nadu, ₹5.85 crore (US$620,000) in Kerala, ₹10 crore (US$1.1 million) in Andhra Pradesh and Telangana, ₹11 crore (US$1.2 million) in Karnataka, ₹4.5 crore (US$480,000) in North India, and ₹40 crore (US$4.3 million) overseas. The film registered ₹50–55 crore (US$5.8–6.4 million) on its second day of release, witnessing a drop of 47.5 percent compared to its first day. Its net collection in all languages, stands being ₹26.56 crore (US$2.8 million). Despite that, the film crossed the ₹100 crore (US$11 million) mark within its second day, with the collections of the first two days, stands at ₹135 crore (US$14 million). On its third day, the film earned ₹35 crore (US$3.7 million) in India and crossed ₹100 crore net at the domestic box office, as well as ₹150 crore (US$16 million) within the third day of its release. The film crossed ₹300 crore (US$32 million) within four days, and registered 86 percent occupancy on 12 and 13 August, respectively.

On the Independence Day (15 August), the film scored ₹40 crore (US$4.3 million) registering the second-best for the Indian box office, besides Gadar 2 which grossed ₹60 crore (US$6.4 million). The Producers Guild of India and Multiplex Association of India attributed the weekend of 11–13 August being the busiest single weekend post the COVID-19 pandemic where Gadar 2, Jailer and OMG 2 amassed ₹390 crore (US$42 million), the highest since the past decade. Film distributor Akshaye Rathi claimed that 65 percent of Jailer's revenue were attributed to single screens, while 35 percent of it came from multiplexes. Within 10 days of its release, Jailer had grossed ₹194.7 crore (US$21 million) in Tamil Nadu, ₹75 crore (US$8.0 million) in Andhra Pradesh and Telangana and ₹60 crore (US$6.4 million) in Karnataka, and ₹166.31 crore (US$18 million) at the overseas box office. It reached the ₹500 crore (US$53 million) mark within that period.

In Andhra Pradesh and Telangana, the film opened to ₹20 crore (US$2.1 million) at the end of the first week. While exhibitors in those regions were apprehensive of distributing the film, after the performance of Rajinikanth's last three films, the success of Jailer was attributed to the audience appeal over its content as well as the underperformance of Chiranjeevi's Bholaa Shankar in those states. Within 18 days, the Telugu version earned over ₹100 crore becoming one of the highest grossing dubbed film in those regions. It grossed nearly ₹56 crore (US$6.0 million) from the Kerala box office in its lifetime. Despite being successful in the Southern states, it underperformed at the North Indian theatres due to the film not being showcased at national chains, poor promotions in the vicinity and competition from Gadar 2 and OMG 2 which significantly performed well in the North belt. Outside India, the film performed extraordinarily well. At the Malaysian box office, it registered the highest-single day opening for a Tamil film, grossing RM 3 million (₹5.8 crore) and became the highest-grossing Tamil film in Malaysia after its four-day opening weekend.

While India Today reported the worldwide box office collection to be ₹605 crore (US$65 million), Cinema Express and Firstpost stated that the film grossed ₹650 crore (US$69 million) worldwide in its total theatrical run. This makes it the highest-grossing Tamil film of 2023 and the second highest-grossing Tamil film of all time after 2.0. It collected 264 crores in Tamil Nadu alone becoming the first film to do so. Jailer created various records which includes being the highest grossing Tamil film in North America and the highest grossing Tamil film in Karnataka.

=== Records ===
Jailer recorded a massive footfalls of approximately 2.80 crores in India.

Rajinikanth's Jailer is the third Indian movie and the only Tamil film to gross more than ₹50 crore in all southern states.

Rajinikanth's Jailer has performed strongly at the UAE box office since its opening weekend, ultimately becoming the country's highest-grossing film of 2023 by surpassing Barbie. The film collected US$6.4 million in the UAE, exceeding the record previously held by Shah Rukh Khan's Pathaan, became the highest-grossing Indian film in UAE at that time.

Ayngaran announced that Jailer achieved the highest box-office gross in Malaysia among all Indian films, and by a significant margin.

Jailer was one of only five Indian films to surpass ₹650 crore at the global box office in 2023, and it was the sole South Indian film to achieve this milestone.

The blockbuster success of Jailer has boosted the share price of Chennai-based media conglomerate Sun TV Network Ltd, the parent company of Sun Pictures, which produced the film. Since the film's release on August 10, the company's stock on the BSE has climbed 11.45%.

== Television premiere ==
On 12 November 2023, Jailer was the first Indian film to have a simultaneous television premiere in multiple languages on the same day. The film was broadcast in Tamil on Sun TV, Telugu on Gemini TV, Kannada on Udaya TV, and Hindi on Star Gold. The coordinated pan-India television premiere coincided with the Diwali festival, significantly enhancing its reach and viewership across different linguistic regions.

Jailer recorded strong viewership across multiple language markets. Television ratings were reported separately for individual language broadcasts, as no consolidated nationwide TRP figure was officially released. The Tamil version, aired on Sun TV, registered the highest viewership, recording a TRP of 15.59 in urban and rural markets combined, with approximately 12.5 million impressions. The Telugu version, telecast on Gemini TV, achieved a TRP of 5.39 in combined markets, with an urban TRP of 6.3. Ratings data for the Kannada and Hindi versions, broadcast on Udaya TV and Star Gold respectively, were not publicly disclosed at the time of reporting.

== Accolades ==
Award (Note: Awards, festivals and organisations are in alphabetical order.)	Date of ceremony (Note: Date is linked to the article about the awards held that year, wherever possible.)	Category	Recipient(s)	Result	Ref.
Ananda Vikatan Cinema Awards	22 June 2024	Best Film	Jailer	Nominated	
Ananda Vikatan Cinema Awards	22 June 2024	Best Director	Nelson Dilipkumar	Nominated	
Ananda Vikatan Cinema Awards	22 June 2024	Best Actor	Rajinikanth	Nominated	
Ananda Vikatan Cinema Awards	22 June 2024	Best Actor in a Supporting Role	Vasanth Ravi	Nominated	
Ananda Vikatan Cinema Awards	22 June 2024	Best Actress in a Supporting Role	Ramya Krishnan	Nominated	
Ananda Vikatan Cinema Awards	22 June 2024	Best Actor in a Negative Role	Vinayakan	Nominated	
Ananda Vikatan Cinema Awards	22 June 2024	Best Comedian	Yogi Babu	Nominated	
Ananda Vikatan Cinema Awards	22 June 2024	Best Comedian	Sunil	Nominated	
Ananda Vikatan Cinema Awards	22 June 2024	Best Music Director – Songs	Anirudh Ravichander	Won (Note: also for Leo (2023))	
Ananda Vikatan Cinema Awards	22 June 2024	Best Music Director – Score	Anirudh Ravichander	Nominated	
Ananda Vikatan Cinema Awards	22 June 2024	Best Lyricist	Vignesh Shivan – ("Rathamaarey")	Nominated	
Ananda Vikatan Cinema Awards	22 June 2024	Best Lyricist	Super Subu ("Hukum – Thalaivar Alappara")	Nominated	
Ananda Vikatan Cinema Awards	22 June 2024	Best Male Playback Singer	Anirudh Ravichander ("Hukum – Thalaivar Alappara")	Nominated	
Ananda Vikatan Cinema Awards	22 June 2024	Best Male Playback Singer	Vishal Mishra – ("Rathamaarey")	Nominated	
Ananda Vikatan Cinema Awards	22 June 2024	Best Female Playback Singer	Shilpa Rao – ("Kaavaalaa")	Nominated	
Ananda Vikatan Cinema Awards	22 June 2024	Best Cinematographer	Vijay Kartik Kannan	Nominated	
Ananda Vikatan Cinema Awards	22 June 2024	Best Editor	R. Nirmal	Nominated	
Ananda Vikatan Cinema Awards	22 June 2024	Best Production	Sun Pictures	Nominated	
Ananda Vikatan Cinema Awards	22 June 2024	Best Cast and Crew	Jailer	Nominated	
Ananda Vikatan Cinema Awards	22 June 2024	Most Popular Film	Jailer	Won	
Filmfare Awards South	3 August 2024	Best Supporting Actor – Tamil	Vinayakan	Nominated	
Filmfare Awards South	3 August 2024	Best Music Director – Tamil	Anirudh Ravichander	Nominated	
Filmfare Awards South	3 August 2024	Best Male Playback Singer – Tamil	Anirudh Ravichander ("Hukum – Thalaivar Alappara")	Nominated	
Filmfare Awards South	3 August 2024	Best Female Playback Singer – Tamil	Shilpa Rao – ("Kaavaalaa")	Nominated	
IIFA Utsavam	27 September 2024	Best Picture – Tamil	Jailer	Won	
IIFA Utsavam	27 September 2024	Best Direction – Tamil	Nelson Dilipkumar	Nominated	
IIFA Utsavam	27 September 2024	Best Actor in a Leading Role – Tamil	Rajnikanth	Nominated	
IIFA Utsavam	27 September 2024	Best Actress in a Supporting Role – Tamil	Ramya Krishnan	Nominated	
IIFA Utsavam	27 September 2024	Best Music Direction – Tamil	Anirudh Ravichander	Nominated	
IIFA Utsavam	27 September 2024	Best Lyrics – Tamil	Super Subu – ("Hukum – Thalaivar Alappara")	Won	
IIFA Utsavam	27 September 2024	Best Male Playback Singer – Tamil	Anirudh Ravichander – ("Hukum – Thalaivar Alappara")	Nominated	
IIFA Utsavam	27 September 2024	Best Male Playback Singer – Tamil	Vishal Mishra – ("Rathamaarey")	Nominated	
IIFA Utsavam	27 September 2024	Best Female Playback Singer – Tamil	Shilpa Rao – ("Kaavaalaa")	Nominated	
IIFA Utsavam	27 September 2024	Best Performance in a Negative Role – Tamil	Vinayakan	Nominated	
South Indian International Movie Awards	15 September 2024	Best Film – Tamil	Jailer	Won	
South Indian International Movie Awards	15 September 2024	Best Director – Tamil	Nelson Dilipkumar	Won	
South Indian International Movie Awards	15 September 2024	Best Cinematographer – Tamil	Vijay Kartik Kannan	Nominated	
South Indian International Movie Awards	15 September 2024	Best Actor – Tamil	Rajinikanth	Nominated	
South Indian International Movie Awards	15 September 2024	Best Actor in a Supporting Role – Tamil	Vasanth Ravi	Won	
South Indian International Movie Awards	15 September 2024	Best Actor in a Negative Role – Tamil	Vinayakan	Nominated	
South Indian International Movie Awards	15 September 2024	Best Comedian – Tamil	Yogi Babu	Won	
South Indian International Movie Awards	15 September 2024	Best Comedian – Tamil	Sunil	Nominated	
South Indian International Movie Awards	15 September 2024	Best Music Director – Tamil	Anirudh Ravichander	Won	
South Indian International Movie Awards	15 September 2024	Best Lyricist – Tamil	Vignesh Shivan – ("Rathamaarey")	Won	
South Indian International Movie Awards	15 September 2024	Best Male Playback Singer – Tamil	Vishal Mishra – ("Rathamaarey")	Nominated	

== Sequel ==
Prior to the film's release, Nelson revealed intentions of making sequels to his previous films, that resulted in the progress of a sequel being questioned. Soon after the film's success, reports of a potential sequel being resurfaced, but its status was not confirmed until in January 2024, when Nelson started writing the script for the sequel, and it was developed under the working title Hukum. The film was officially announced on 14 January 2025, coinciding with Pongal, under the title Jailer 2, and filming began in March 2025. It was released on 15 October 2026.

== Documentary series ==
A three-part documentary series titled Jailer Unlocked premiered on Sun NXT on 16 August 2024. It documents the making of the film with Nelson, Anirudh and the cast and crew interacting about the process.

== Impact ==
Speaking to Soundarya Athimuthu of The Quint, film trade analyst Sreedhar Pillai had said that Jailer served as the turning point for Nelson Dilipkumar's career, as its success catapulted him as one of the accomplished directors in Tamil cinema opening doors to larger projects and greater recognition. Pillai also cited on the subpar critical reception of Nelson's previous film Beast, adding "Jailer stands as a beacon of redemption and transformation, not only for Nelson but for all those in the creative realm. It serves as a vivid reminder that a single success possesses the potency to overshadow past missteps and propel individuals to newfound heights. As Nelson continues to bask in the glow of Jailer's victory, he does so with the knowledge that the cinematic canvas is vast and forgiving, offering artists the opportunity to paint fresh and triumphant narratives."

Tiruppur Subramanian also stated that "Jailer's triumph not only validates his creative vision but also solidifies Nelson's reputation as a filmmaker capable of delivering both commercial success and critical acclaim". The film gained popularity for the dialogue "Inga Naan Thaan Kingu" (transl. I am the only king here), spoken by Rajinikanth in the film and in the song "Hukum". It later inspired a 2024 film to have the same dialogue as its title.
