= Heisenberg (lyricist) =

Anonymous lyricist of Indian films

Heisenberg is the pseudonym of an anonymous lyricist who works in Indian films. He writes primarily in English and is known for his collaborations with Anirudh Ravichander and Lokesh Kanagaraj, who have declined to reveal his identity.

== Overview ==
The pseudonym "Heisenberg" was derived from the Breaking Bad character Walter White's criminal alias. The lyricist made his film debut with Vikram (2022) and returned with Leo (2023), with both films directed by Lokesh Kanagaraj and having music composed by Anirudh Ravichander. He has also written for Vettaiyan and Devara: Part 1 (both 2024), also having music by Anirudh.

Interest in uncovering Heisenberg's true identity began among fans soon after the release of the music video of "Wasted" from Vikram, and only amplified after the release of "Bloody Sweet" from Leo. Lokesh has asserted that Heisenberg is not himself, Anirudh or artificial intelligence but a separate person, and the clue to his identity is in the 1980 Tamil film Varumayin Niram Sivappu. Anirudh said it was not initially planned to keep Heisenberg's identity a long-term secret, but social media users started showing curiosity after the success of Vikram's soundtrack, and even many fake accounts claimed to be the lyricist, after which he and Lokesh decided to play along. While promoting Coolie (2025), he stated that Heisenberg's true identity "will be a secret that Lokesh and I will take to the grave".

Some fans have speculated that either Kamal Haasan or S. Ve. Shekher might be Heisenberg because they acted in Varumayin Niram Sivappu, or Nelson Dilipkumar because the film features a character using the alias Dilip. Nelson has denied being Heisenberg but believes it is Lokesh.

== Discography ==
Year	Film	Songs	Notes	Ref.
2022	Vikram	"Wasted", "Once Upon A Time"		
2023	Leo	"Bloody Sweet", "Ordinary Person", "I'm Scared", "Leo Das Entry"	"Ordinary Person" is part of the extended soundtrack	
2023	Jawan	"Maasi Theme", "Vikram Rathore" (English)	Background score tracks	
2024	Vettaiyan	"Hands Up"		
2024	Devara: Part 1	"All Hail the Tiger", "Red Sea"	Non-album singles	
2025	Coolie	"I Am The Danger", "Mobsta"	"Mobsta" was co-written by Arivu	
2026	Love Insurance Kompany	"Adaavadi"	Co-written by Rokesh and Vignesh Shivan	
2026	DC	"Ain't Nobody", "Namaste", "Hangova", "Vizhigale", "Don't Give a Damn", "Bum Baa Diga Diga", "Jaya Jaya Shankara"	"Bum Baa Diga Diga" was co-written by Vedan	
2026	The Paradise	"Welcome to the Paradise"		
2026	Jailer 2	"One Name", "One Sun One Moon"	"One Sun One Moon" was co-written by Super Subu	
2026	King	"They Call Him King"		
