= The Paradise (film) =

2026 Indian film by Srikanth Odela

- Theatrical release poster
- Directed by: Srikanth Odela
- Screenplay by: Srikanth Odela; Vinay Sagar Jonnala
- Story by: Srikanth Odela
- Produced by: Sudhakar Cherukuri
- Starring: Nani; Mohan Babu; Kayadu Lohar; Sonali Kulkarni; Raghav Juyal
- Cinematography: CH Sai
- Edited by: Naveen Nooli
- Music by: Anirudh Ravichander
- Production company: SLV Cinemas
- Distributed by: see below
- Release date: 24 September 2026
- Running time: 173 minutes
- Country: India
- Language: Telugu
- Budget: est. ₹150–200 crore
- Box office: est. ₹169 crore

The Paradise is a 2026 Indian Telugu-language action film directed by Srikanth Odela and produced by Sudhakar Cherukuri under SLV Cinemas. The film stars Nani, Mohan Babu, Kayadu Lohar, Sonali Kulkarni and Raghav Juyal in the lead roles. In the film, Nani plays the leader of a struggling tribe in 1980s Secunderabad as they battle discrimination and fight for citizenship, challenging systemic oppression.

The film was officially announced in March 2024, under the tentative title Nani 33, as it is the actor's 33rd film as a leading actor, and the official title was announced the following November. Principal photography commenced in June 2025 in Hyderabad, with much of the film shot on purpose-built sets and at Ramoji Film City. The film's music was composed by Anirudh Ravichander, cinematography handled by CH Sai and editing by Navin Nooli.

The Paradise was released worldwide on 24 September 2026 and received mixed to negative reviews from critics with praise for Nani's performance, production values, technical aspects and Anirudh Ravichander's music, but criticised the screenplay, editing, excessive violence, objectification and pacing. Despite the strong backlash, the film managed to become an above-average grosser with minor losses.

== Plot ==
In 1980s Secunderabad, the Savaari community—a nomadic, marginalized tribe of roughly 5,000 people—lives in a slum colloquially known as "Paradise". Despite India's independence, the tribe has been completely disenfranchised, stripped of basic human rights, and denied citizenship, voting cards, and legal recognition for 40 years. They are subjected to severe exploitation and treated as modern-day slaves by a tyrannical feudal landlord, Shikanja Maalik, the heir and patriarch to the Durjam clan, who rules the region with an iron fist. Sammakka, a resilient woman from the tribe, becomes the first person to openly defy Maalik's regime, demanding systemic identity and legal recognition for her people.

Sammakka's son, Jadal, harbors deep-seated bitterness and anger toward his mother, compounded by a traumatic childhood incident where Maalik forcibly tattooed and branded him a bastard, on Jadal's right hand. After serving a 14-year sentence in prison, the imposing and hardened Jadal is released and returns to Paradise. While his initial motivation is strictly a personal vendetta to settle scores with Maalik and his family, including his ruthless son and childhood rival, Vikram Maalik, he finds his home on the brink of complete destruction. Meanwhile, Vikram Malik is aggressively climbing the local political ladder to become an MLA. To clear his path to power and after being humiliated by Samakka while submitting his nomination as an MLA, Vikram escalates the violence against the Savaari tribe, intent on permanently wiping out their settlement, by publicly stripping Samakka.

== Cast ==
- Nani as Sarakka alias Jadal
- Mohan Babu as Shikanja Malik
- Kayadu Lohar as Subbalakshmi "Subbu", Jadal's love interest
- Sonali Kulkarni as Samakka, Jadal's mother
- Raghav Juyal as Vikram Malik
- Sampoornesh Babu as Biryani, Jadal's best friend
- Easwari Rao as Kamli, Samakka's best friend
- Tanikella Bharani as Metta, Shikanja’s right-hand man
- Vishika as Devi, Biryani’s wife and Jadal’s sister-figure
- Krishna Teja as District Collector Ramaswamy
- Priyadarshi Pulikonda as MLA Shankar "Shankaranna" Rao (based on K. Chandrashekar Rao)
- P. Vijay Kumar as N. T. Rama Rao
- Raja Ravindra as SI
- Satya Prakash as SP Bichu Singh IPS
- Ram Jagan as Party member
- M. S. Chowdary as MLA
- Duvvasi Mohan as Nawab
- Ashok Kumar as Doctor
- Geetha Bhascker as School Teacher
- Kranthi Balivada as Subbu’s mother

Cameo appearance

- Sathyaraj as Advocate Nanbaa, Shikanja’s friend
- Keerthy Suresh as a dancer in the item number "Yeshanagula"

== Production ==
=== Development and pre-production ===
On 30 March 2024, marking the first anniversary of the release of Dasara (2023), actor Nani, director Srikanth Odela and producer Sudhakar Cherukuri under the banner SLV Cinemas announced their reunion for Nani's 33rd film as lead actor. Odela spent an extended period developing the screenplay. Reports stated that he had worked on the script for around two years. He co-wrote the screenplay along with Arjuna Paturi, Vamshi Krishna Pinnika, Vasanth Masadi, Bala Ganesh K, with the dialogues being written by Thota Srinivas and Ajju Mahakili. Additional screenplays were also written by Vinay Sagar Jonnala and Madhava Murthy Bojanapu. The team subsequently filmed a promotional teaser for the project in September 2024. The film was conceived as a period action drama film set in the 1980s Secunderabad. Odela described his intention of presenting social taboos and oppression in an unfiltered manner. Nani similarly described the film as being conceived on an unusually large scale, comparing its intended tone to the Mad Max franchise. The film's production budget is reported to range from ₹150 crore (US$16 million)—₹200 crore (US$21 million), making it the most expensive film of Nani's career.

The official title logo of The Paradise.

A formal puja ceremony was held on 13 October 2024, coinciding with Dussehra. Three days later, Anirudh Ravichander was officially announced as the film's composer. He reunited with Nani after previously composing for Jersey and Nani's Gang Leader (both 2019). The film's title was subsequently revealed as The Paradise on 6 November 2024. The title announcement followed a leak of the title during production, after which the makers officially confirmed it. During the pre-production, a large-scale slum environment had taken approximately five months to construct, with the filmmakers deliberately designing the settlement on a much larger scale than a conventional slum set. The main set reportedly covered around 30 acres. Later reports revealed that the team also constructed a 2,5-acre water-village set, a 60-foot hero house and other large physical environments rather than relying on CGI. Hundreds of workers were involved in constructing the sets. G. K. Vishnu was announced as the cinematographer during the initial production stage. However, he was later replaced by CH Sai. The principal technical team includes Sai, editor Navin Nooli, production designer Avinash Kolla, costume designer Ajay Kumar J, and VFX supervisor Naresh Yalla. The production was initially targeting a 26 March 2026 theatrical release, with the date being announced alongside the first promotional material in March 2025.

=== Casting ===
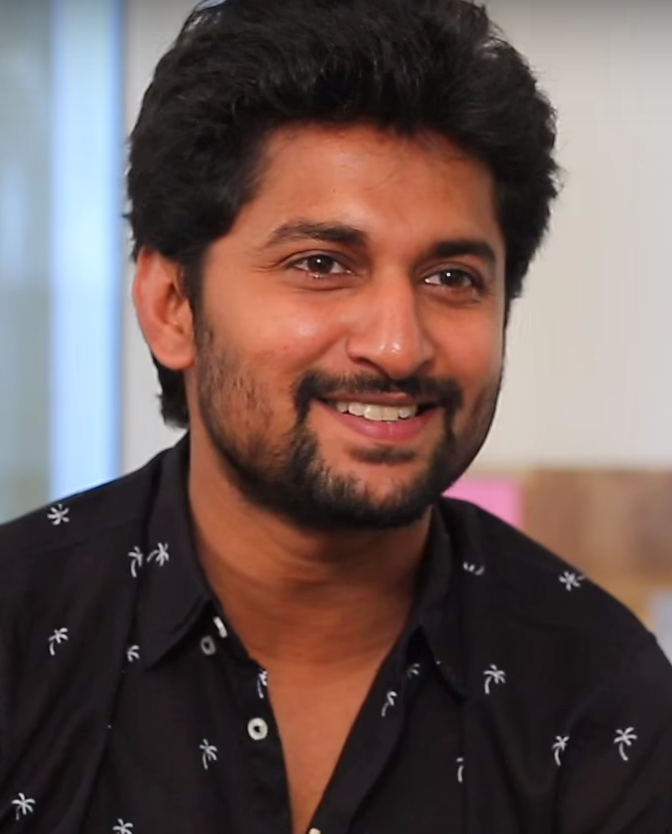
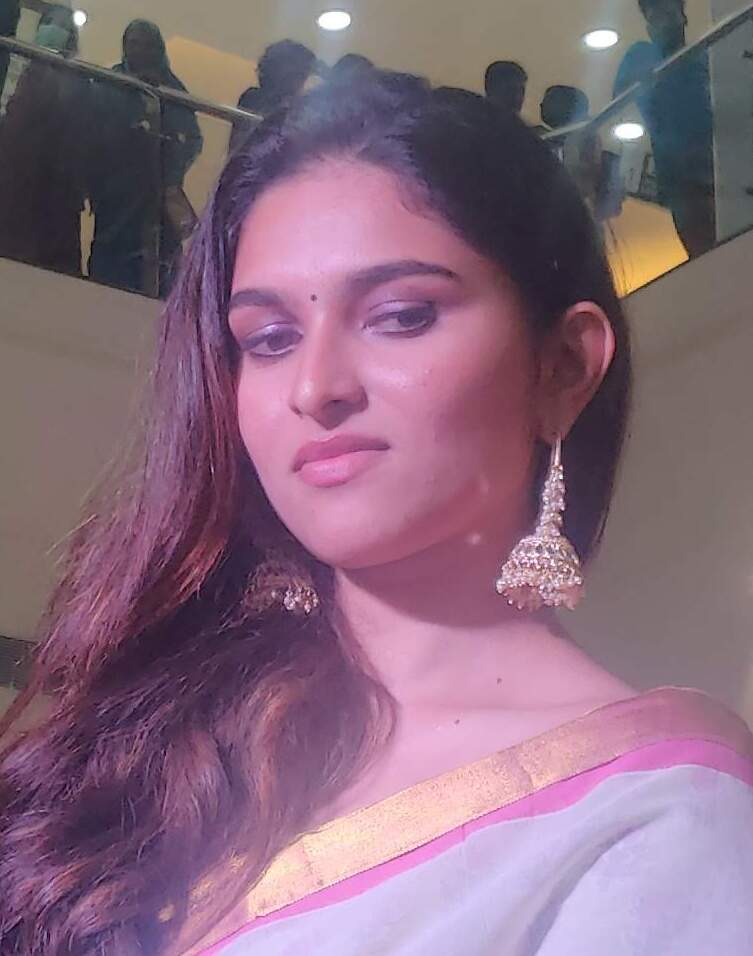
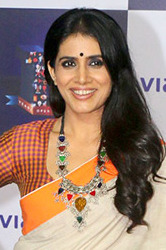
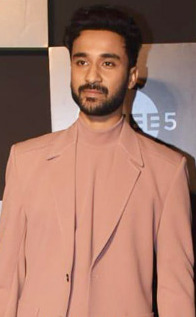
The film's primary cast — Nani, Mohan Babu, Kayadu Lohar, Sonali Kulkarni and Raghav Juyal

Nani underwent immense training to achieve a muscular look for the film. His character, Jadal, is presented as a member of the marginalised community at the centre of the story who eventually assumes a leadership role in its struggle. Kayadu Lohar was reported to have joined the project as the female lead in July 2025. She later became officially established as the female lead, Subbulakshmi, with the announcement released in April 2026. Raghav Juyal joined the cast in July 2025, in his Telugu film debut. Odela later explained that Juyal was selected after the filmmakers saw his performance in Kill (2024); according to Odela, they had originally imagined a different physical type for the antagonist but were persuaded by Juyal's performance. Juyal plays Vikram Maalik. Mohan Babu was subsequently confirmed in a major role as Shikanja Maalik. His involvement was reported during production, and later promotional material confirmed his presence.

Sonali Kulkarni confirmed to plays Jadal's mother, marking her Telugu film debut. Her involvement was eventually confirmed through promotional material, and Nani later identified the mother-son relationship as an important component of the film. Sampoornesh Babu joined the cast as Biryani, described by the makers as Jadal's best friend. His casting was formally announced in December 2025. The current production credits also list actors including Easwari Rao, Tanikella Bharani, Raja Ravindra and M. S. Chowdary. Keerthy Suresh made a cameo appearance as a dancer in the item number "Yeshanagula", reuniting with Nani and Odela after Dasara.

=== Filming ===
Although the puja ceremony took place in October 2024, the regular principal photography began on 21 June 2025 in Hyderabad. Much of the film was shot on purpose-built sets in Hyderabad, with Ramoji Film City also serving as a major filming location. The first week of filming focused on childhood portions of the story. Nani joined the production shortly, beginning an announced 40-day schedule involving major scenes with the principal cast. The production also includes substantial action choreography. The credited stunt team includes Ram Lakshman, Real Satish, Maibam Nabakanta and Simhadri. A major prison-set action sequence, choreographed by Real Satish, was filmed at Ramoji Film City in early July. Cinematographer CH Sai later revealed in an interview with Cinema Express that the sequence took over two weeks to film. Later reports described that Nani performing demanding action work and repeatedly requesting additional takes. In mid December, Mohan Babu completed filming his portions after shooting for nearly 20 days.

By January 2026, producer Sudhakar Cherukuri said approximately 60% of the shoot had been completed. He also explained that rain had damaged some sets and that winter conditions had slowed production. One major sequence was the introduction song "Aaya Sher", which was filmed on an elaborate set at Ramoji Film City with hundreds of dancers. Cinema Express reported in February 2026 that the sequence was being shot on a massive set, with choreography by Sudhan Master and music by Anirudh. The original release date was 26 March 2026. In February 2026, the makers officially moved the release to 21 August 2026. At that point, production was still continuing, including filming of major sequences. Production eventually exceeded 100 shooting days. In May 2026, amid rumours that the film was undergoing reshoots, the official production team stated that more that 100 shooting days had already been completed and explicitly denied that any reshoots had taken place or were planned. The film subsequently remained in production through the summer of 2026, with the date being delayed to 24 September 2026. In early September, the production began the final schedule at Ramoji Film City. A song sequence featuring Nani and Kayadu Lohar was shot. Reports on 10 September stated that filming had wrapped, although Nani subsequently indicated two days later that some shooting was still being completed.

=== Post-production ===
The film's editing is handled by Navin Nooli, while Naresh Yalla serves as VFX supervisor. Ken Metzker is also credited as a colorist. In early September 2026, reports circulated that the film could be delayed because significant VFX/CG work remained, particularly around the climax. On 12 September, Nani explained why the film would be releasing without a conventional theatrical trailer, which — according to his comments — was due to the team prioritising completion of the film itself and did not want to divert several days of post-production work toward preparing a trailer. It was also reported by The Indian Express that multiple post-production units were working simultaneously during the extremely compressed period between the completion of filming and the scheduled release.

== Music ==
The soundtrack is composed by Anirudh Ravichander, marking his third collaboration with Nani after Jersey and Nani's Gang Leader (both 2019). The audio rights were acquired by Saregama Music.

"The Paradise Theme" was featured in the first promotional teaser of the film which released on 15 May 2025. The first single, "Aaya Sher", was released on 24 February 2026 and crossed over 200 million views on YouTube. The second single, "Yeshanagula", was unveiled at Anirudh's concert in Dallas, USA. The song is a recreation of the Telugu folk song "Yeshanagula Kattameeda."

== Release ==
=== Theatrical ===
The Paradise was initially scheduled for a worldwide theatrical release on 26 March 2026. The film was subsequently postponed to 21 August 2026, before the makers announced a further postponement to 24 September 2026. Paid preview shows were held on the evening of 23 September 2026.

The September release was officially reaffirmed by the makers in early September 2026 following reports that the film could be postponed again because of pending visual-effects and post-production work. The film is scheduled to have premieres on 23 September, followed by its worldwide theatrical release on 24 September. The film is planned for a release in eight languages: Telugu, Hindi, Tamil, Malayalam, Kannada, Bengali, English and Spanish. The film received an A (adults only) certificate from the Central Board of Film Certification (CBFC) for strong violence, along with a finalised runtime of 173 minutes after some violent visuals and profanities were censored.

=== Distribution ===
Mythri Movie Makers acquired the distribution rights for Andhra Pradesh and Telangana. Think Studios acquired the distribution rights for Tamil Nadu, while the Kerala distribution rights were given to Wayfarer Films and AA Films acquired the distribution rights for North India. The overseas distribution rights were bought by Prathyangira Cinemas for ₹18 crore (US$1.9 million), releasing themselves in North America.

=== Home media ===
The digital distribution rights of the film were acquired by Netflix. The film began streaming on Netflix from 22 October 2026 in Telugu and dubbed versions of Tamil, Hindi, Kannada and Malayalam languages.

== Reception ==
=== Box office ===
The film grossed ₹54.9 crore in India—including revenue from preview screenings, and approximately ₹22 crore overseas, bringing its total global opening-day gross to ₹76.9 crore. The net box office collection in India on the opening day was ₹34.65 crore. The film's box office revenue was highest in the Telugu market, followed by the Hindi market, while the Tamil market generated the lowest earnings. This opening-day performance set a record for the highest opening-day box office of Nani's career. As of the second day, the film has recorded a net box office collection of ₹61.15 crore and a gross collection of ₹72.5 crore in India. Its global gross collection was ₹98.5 crore. Within the thirteen days of its release, the worldwide gross collection was ₹169.15 crore.

=== Critical reception ===
On the review aggregator website Rotten Tomatoes, 0% of 11 critics' reviews are positive, with an average rating of 3.7/10.

Anindita Mukhopadhyay of India TV gave 2/5 stars and wrote "The screenplay feels overcrowded. The editing doesn't always allow scenes to breathe. Several characters are underwritten, and some of the film's strongest ideas get lost in the noise." Suresh Kavirayani of Cinema Express gave 2/5 stars and wrote "The Paradise falls short of expectations. Director Srikanth Odela has focused more on mindless action and violence and much less on emotion. The mother-son sentiment was supposed to be the heart of the film, but the director fails to convey it effectively on the big screen. Except for one or two scenes here and there, the film offers very little and ultimately turns out to be a misfire. Paradise Biryani is very famous in Hyderabad, but this Paradise leaves you disappointed."

Yashaswini Sri of Indian Express gave 2/5 stars and wrote "With mindless violence and blood, the movie just doesn’t give anything to hold onto." Janani K of India Today gave 2/5 stars and wrote "The Paradise is so fragmented that it struggles to establish cohesion and continuity and, most importantly, lacks a substantial story to hold it together." Rasti Amena of Siasat gave 2/5 stars and wrote "While the film has scale, violence and some ambitious ideas, it struggles to offer the emotional connect that usually makes a Nani film work".

Satish Sundaresan of Free Press Journal gave 1.5/5 stars and wrote "While the film is a visual treat for all Nani fans, some might be disappointed with the film in totality due to the not-so-relevant and slightly unbelievable narrative. Skipping this film seems a better option for those who do not prefer hardcore violence and spineless action!" Goutham S of Pinkvilla gave 1.5/5 stars and wrote "The Paradise has some crazy ideas from a conceptual standpoint; however, in execution, the film has turned out to be flat and distasteful."

Neeshita Nyayapati of Hindustan Times gave 1/5 stars and wrote "This film is bogged down by a legacy it fails to live up to. And that’s a shame, because Sammakka and the audience both deserve better than a film that makes you wonder if Toxic was better." Sreeju Sudhakaran of Rediff gave 1/5 stars and wrote "The Paradise is a mind-numbingly senseless, hellish cycle of violence, gore, and torture porn that makes you question if everyone involved in the film harbours some sort of bloodlust". Sangeetha Devi Dundoo of The Hindu, described The Paradise as an ambitious but emotionally distant misfire. Although she praised the 1980s aesthetic, cinematography, and Nani's physical transformation, she criticized the weak narrative, unconvincing world-building, and excessive violence.

Chirag Sehgal of News18 gave the film 2.5 out of 5 stars and praising Nani's high-intensity performance and the film's visual aesthetics and technical presentation. However, he noted that the film loses momentum in its second half due to an uneven narrative and familiar storytelling tropes, which prevent it from fully realizing its potential as an impactful action drama. Saibal Chatterjee of NDTV rated the film 2.5 out of 5 stars, noting that despite Nani's strong performance, the film becomes scattered and loses emotional depth due to excessive violence. BVS Prakash of Deccan Chronicle rated the film 1.5 out of 5 stars, stating that despite Nani's ferocious screen presence, the film's larger-than-life ambitions fell flat due to a weak, overcooked screenplay and excessive action. While praising supporting performances from Mohan Babu and Sonali Kulkarni, the review noted that relentless violence could not compensate for the film's story flaws. Sanjana Pulugurtha The Times of India rated the film 3 out of 5 stars, describing it as an intense, action-packed drama. The review praised Nani's raw and powerful lead performance, Santosh Narayanan's background score, and the film's strong technical elements, while pointing out that the relentless pacing and heavy violence might not appeal to all audiences. Balakrishna Ganeshan of The News Minute noted that while the film attempts to highlight social inequality and violence, the storytelling feels fragmented and secondary to the stylized action sequences. Consequently, the reviewer felt the film failed to create an emotionally resonant impact despite its strong technical production.
