= Anirudh Ravichander discography =

Indian music composer discography

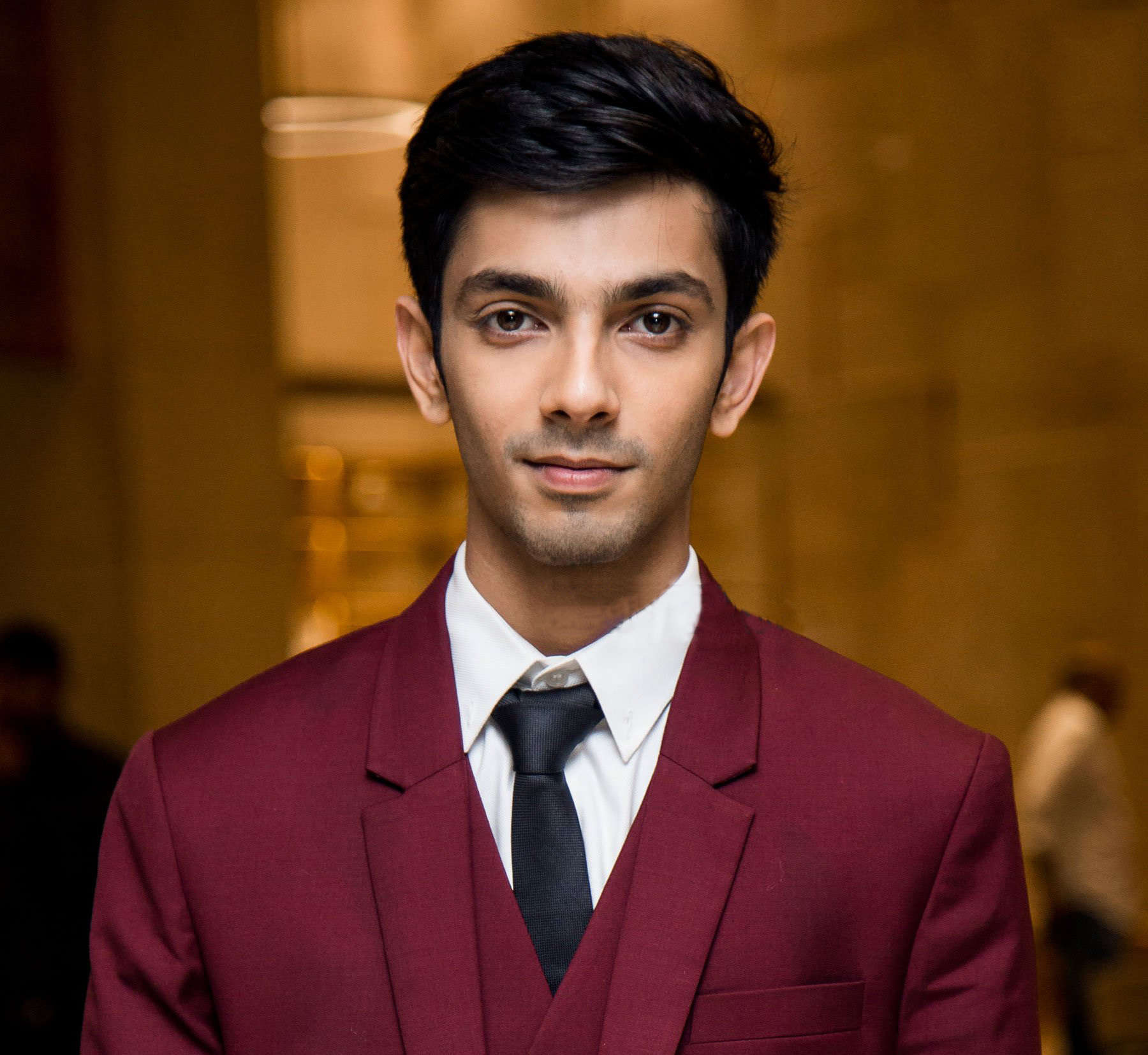
Anirudh Ravichander

Anirudh Ravichander made his music debut in 2012 with the Tamil film 3. During the course of his decade-long career, he has composed and produced original scores and songs for more than 30 films in various languages, predominantly in Tamil, in addition to Telugu and Hindi.

His debut song "Why This Kolaveri Di", composed for the 2012 film 3, went viral across the globe and has achieved over 400 million views on YouTube. A.R. Murugadoss signed him to compose music for Kaththi starring Vijay, which included the viral hit "Selfie Pulla".

== As composer ==
Key
†	Denotes films that have not yet been released

- The films are listed in the order of their release, and the soundtrack release year is provided separately.
- # Indicates Film released year.
- ♦ Indicates Soundtracks released year.

List of soundtrack and score credits
Year	Film	Director	Language	Notes	Ref.
2012	3	Aishwarya Rajinikanth	Tamil		
2013	Ethir Neechal	R. S. Durai Senthilkumar	Tamil		
2013	David / David (Note: Guest composer of the film released.)	Bejoy Nambiar	Hindi (Note: Original language release or simultaneous makes (if featuring in more languages).); Tamil	Debut in Hindi cinema; Guest composer; 1 song only (which released in Tamil first)	
2013	Vanakkam Chennai	Kiruthiga Udhayanidhi	Tamil		
2013	Irandaam Ulagam	Selvaraghavan	Tamil	3 songs and background score	
2014	Velaiilla Pattadhari	R. Velraj	Tamil		
2014	Maan Karate	Krish Thirukumaran	Tamil		
2014	Kaththi	A. R. Murugadoss	Tamil		
2015	Kaaki Sattai	R. S. Durai Senthilkumar	Tamil		
2015	Maari	Balaji Mohan	Tamil		
2015	Naanum Rowdydhaan	Vignesh Shivan	Tamil		
2015	Vedalam	Siva	Tamil		
2015	Thanga Magan	R. Velraj	Tamil		
2016	Remo	Bakkiyaraj Kannan	Tamil		
2017	Rum	Sai Bharath	Tamil		
2017	Vivegam	Siva	Tamil		
2017	Velaikkaran	Mohan Raja	Tamil		
2018	Agnyaathavaasi	Trivikram Srinivas	Telugu	Debut in Telugu Cinema	
2018	Thaanaa Serndha Koottam	Vignesh Shivan	Tamil		
2018	Kolamaavu Kokila	Nelson Dilipkumar	Tamil		
2018	U Turn	Pawan Kumar	Tamil; Telugu	Guest composer; 1 song only	
2019	Petta	Karthik Subbaraj	Tamil		
2019	Jersey	Gowtam Tinnanuri	Telugu		
2019	Thumbaa	Harish Ram L. H	Tamil	Guest composer; 1 song only	
2019	Gang Leader	Vikram Kumar	Telugu		
2020	Darbar	A. R. Murugadoss	Tamil		
2020	Dharala Prabhu	Krishna Marimuthu	Tamil	Guest composer; 1 song only; Reused from Gang Leader	
2020	Paava Kadhaigal	Vignesh Shivan	Tamil	Segment "Love Panna Uttranum"	
2021	Master	Lokesh Kanagaraj	Tamil		
2021	Doctor	Nelson Dilipkumar	Tamil		
2022	Naai Sekar	Kishore Rajkumar	Tamil	Guest composer; 1 song only	
2022	Beast	Nelson Dilipkumar	Tamil		
2022	Jersey	Gowtam Tinnanuri	Hindi	Background score only; Remake of Telugu film of the same name	
2022	Kaathuvaakula Rendu Kaadhal	Vignesh Shivan	Tamil	25th film	
2022	Don	Cibi Chakaravarthi	Tamil		
2022	Vikram	Lokesh Kanagaraj	Tamil		
2022	Thiruchitrambalam	Mithran R. Jawahar	Tamil		
2023	Jailer	Nelson Dilipkumar	Tamil		
2023	Jawan	Atlee	Hindi		
2023	Leo	Lokesh Kanagaraj	Tamil		
2024	Indian 2	S. Shankar	Tamil		
2024	Devara: Part 1	Koratala Siva	Telugu		
2024	Vettaiyan	T. J. Gnanavel	Tamil		
2025	Vidaamuyarchi	Magizh Thirumeni	Tamil		
2025	Kingdom	Gowtam Tinnanuri	Telugu		
2025	Coolie	Lokesh Kanagaraj	Tamil		
2025	Madharaasi	A. R. Murugadoss	Tamil		
2025	The Ba***ds of Bollywood	Aryan Khan	Hindi	Netflix Original; 1 song	
2026	Love Insurance Kompany	Vignesh Shivan	Tamil		
2026	Jana Nayagan	H. Vinoth	Tamil		
2026	DC	Arun Matheswaran	Tamil		
2026	The Paradise	Srikanth Odela	Telugu		
2026	Jailer 2	Nelson Dilipkumar	Tamil	Also arranger and producer; responsible for piano, keys, synth, rhythm and orchestral programming	

=== Upcoming projects ===
Year	Title	Director	Language	Notes	Ref.
2026	King	Siddharth Anand	Hindi	Post-production Guest composer; 1 song only	
2027	Indian 3	S. Shankar	Tamil	Post-production	
2027	Dharman	Ashwath Marimuthu	Tamil	Filming	
2027	Arasan	Vetrimaaran	Tamil	Filming	
2027	Dare Devil	Adhik Ravichandran	Tamil	Filming	
2027	Sandiyar	S. U. Arun Kumar	Tamil	50th Film; Filming	
2027	KH × RK	Nelson Dilipkumar	Tamil	Pre-production	
2027	AA23	Lokesh Kanagaraj	Telugu	Pre-production	
TBA	NTR × Trivikram	Trivikram Srinivas	Telugu	Pre-production	
TBA	M.S. : A Legacy on Screen	Gowtam Tinnanuri	Telugu	Pre-production	
TBA	RC17	Sukumar	Telugu	Pre-production	
TBA	Devara: Part 2	Koratala Siva	Telugu	Pre-production	
TBA	Magic	Gowtam Tinnanuri	Telugu	Delayed	

== As a playback singer ==
Year	Work	Song	Composer	Language	Notes
2012	3	"Come on Girls"	Himself	Tamil	
2013	Ethir Neechal	"Boomi Ennai"	Himself	Tamil	
2013	Ethir Neechal	"Un Paarvayil"	Himself	Tamil	
2013	Ethir Neechal	"Ethir Neechal"	Himself	Tamil	Sung with Yo Yo Honey Singh
2013	David	"Kanave Kanave"	Himself	Tamil	
2013	David	"Yu Hi Re"	Himself	Hindi	Sung with Shweta Mohan
2013	Vanakkam Chennai	"Chennai City"	Himself	Tamil	
2013	Vanakkam Chennai	"Engadi Porandha"	Himself	Tamil	
2013	Vanakkam Chennai	"Ailasa Ailasa"	Himself	Tamil	
2013	Vanakkam Chennai	"Osaka"	Himself	Tamil	
2013	Vanakkam Chennai	"Oh Penne"	Himself	Tamil	
2013	Irandaam Ulagam	"Penne Naa Enna Solla"	Himself	Tamil	
2013	Irandaam Ulagam	"Iravinil Oruvanai"	Himself	Tamil	
2013	Irandaam Ulagam	"Un Kaadhal Ingu Unmaiya"	Himself	Tamil	
2013	Backbench Student	"Sachin Tendulkar Back Bencher"	Sunil Kashyap	Telugu	
2014	Velaiyilla Pattathari	"Velaiyilla Pattathari"	Himself	Tamil	
2014	Velaiyilla Pattathari	"Udhungada Sangu"	Himself	Tamil	
2014	Velaiyilla Pattathari	"What a Karuvaad"	Himself	Tamil	
2014	Velaiyilla Pattathari	"Ey Inga Paaru"	Himself	Tamil	
2014	Maan Karate	"Maanja	Himself	Tamil	
2014	Maan Karate	"Open The Tasmac"	Himself	Tamil	
2014	Maan Karate	"Un Vizhigalil"	Himself	Tamil	
2014	Vadacurry	"Low Aana Life-u"	Vivek-Mervin	Tamil	
2014	Vaalu	"Hey Vasamoakka"	Thaman S	Tamil	
2014	Yennamo Yedho	"Nee Yenna Periya Appatakkaraa ?"	D. Imman	Tamil	
2014	Kaththi	"Pakkam Vanthu"	Himself	Tamil	
2014	Kaththi	"Aathi"	Himself	Tamil	
2014	Kaththi	"Selfie Bomma"	Himself	Telugu	Dubbed version of Selfie Pulla (Tamil)
2014	Kaaki Sattai	"Kadhal Kan Kattudhe"	Himself	Tamil	
2014	Kaaki Sattai	"I'm So Cool"	Himself	Tamil	
2014	Kaaki Sattai	"Shake That"	Himself	Tamil	
2014	Kaaki Sattai	"Trooper Theme"	Himself	Tamil	
2015	I	"Mersalaayiten"	A. R. Rahman	Tamil	
2015	I	"Mersalaayiten (Remix)"	A. R. Rahman	Tamil	
2015	Romeo Juliet	"Dandanakka"	D. Imman	Tamil	
2015	Premam	"Rockankuthu"	Rajesh Murugesan	Malayalam	
2015	Palakkattu Madhavan	"Uchi Mela"	Srikanth Deva	Tamil	
2015	Demonte Colony	"Vaada Vaa Machi"	Keba Jeremiah	Tamil	
2015	Maari	"Maari Thara Local"	Himself	Tamil	
2015	Maari	"Don'u Don'u Don'u"	Himself	Tamil	
2015	Pugazh	"Naanga Podiyan"	Vivek-Mervin	Tamil	
2015	Jwalantham	"Tamate Tamate"	Vikram Subramanya	Kannada	
2015	Vil Ambu	"Aale Saachuputta Kannale"	Navin	Tamil	
2015	Saahasam	"Oh Madhu"	Thaman S	Tamil	
2015	Naanum Rowdy Dhaan	"Thangamey"	Himself	Tamil	
2015	Naanum Rowdy Dhaan	"Neeyum Naanum"	Himself	Tamil	
2015	Naanum Rowdy Dhaan	"Yennai Maatrum Kadhale"	Himself	Tamil	
2015	Naanum Rowdy Dhaan	"Varavaa Varavaa"	Himself	Tamil	
2015	Vedalam	"Aaluma Doluma"	Himself	Tamil	
2015	Vedalam	"The Theri Theme"	Himself	Tamil	
2015	Vedalam	"Veera Vinayaka"	Himself	Tamil	
2015	Jil Jung Juk	"Shoot The Kuruvi"	Vishal Chandrasekhar	Tamil	
2015	Thanga Magan	"Tak Bak"	Himself	Tamil	
2016	Sethupathi	"Hey Mama"	Nivas K. Prasanna	Tamil	
2016	Kanithan	"Yappa Chappa"	Sivamani	Tamil	
2016	Zero	"Uyire Un Uyirena"	Nivas K. Prasanna	Tamil	
2016	Mappillai Singam	"Edhuku Machan Kadhalu"	N. R. Raghunanthan	Tamil	Film version only Sung with Sivakarthikeyan
2016	Thozha	"Thozhaa"	Gopi Sunder	Tamil	
2016	Manal Kayiru 2	"Adiye Thangamatanya"	Dharan Kumar	Tamil	
2016	Manithan	"Munsellada"	Santhosh Narayanan	Tamil	
2016	Marudhu	"Akka Petha Jakkavandi"	D. Imman	Tamil	
2016	Remo	"Remo Nee Kadhalan"	Himself	Tamil	
2016	Remo	"Senjitaley"	Himself	Tamil	
2016	Remo	"Meesa Beauty"	Himself	Tamil	
2016	Remo	"Tamilselvi"	Himself	Tamil	
2016	Remo	"Veshangalil Poiyillai (Additional Song)"	Himself	Tamil	
2016	Remo	"Remo Nee Styleki"	Himself	Telugu	Dubbed version
2016	Remo	"Kollegottey"	Himself	Telugu	Dubbed version
2017	Enakku Vaaitha Adimaigal	"Ondroduthan Ondroga"	Santhosh Dhayanidhi	Tamil	
2017	Bogan	"Damaalu Dumeelu"	D. Imman	Tamil	
2017	Rum	"Holá Amigö"	Himself	Tamil	
2017	Rum	"Peiyophobilia"	Himself	Tamil	
2017	Rum	"Kadavulae Vidai (Reprise)"	Himself	Tamil	
2017	Rum	"Hola Senorita"	Himself	Tamil	
2017	Naalu Peruku Nalladhuna Edhuvum Thappilla	"Kullanari Kootam"	Bjorn Surrao-Navin	Tamil	
2017	Sivalinga	"Rangu Rakkara"	Thaman S	Tamil	
2017	Dora	"Ra Ra Ra"	Vivek-Mervin	Tamil	
2017	Simba	"Marandhadhae"	Vishal Chandrasekhar	Tamil	
2017	Neruppu Da	"Karukku Kallangolu"	Sean Roldan	Tamil	
2017	Sangili Bungili Kadhava Thorae	"Hai En Kai Mela"	Vishal Chandrasekhar	Tamil	
2017	Rangoon	"Foreign Return"	Vishal Chandrasekhar	Tamil	
2017	Vivegam	"Surviva"	Himself	Tamil	
2017	Vivegam	"Thalai Viduthalai"	Himself	Tamil	
2017	Vivegam	"Kadhalaada (Reprise)"	Himself	Tamil	
2017	Vikram Vedha	"Yaanji"	Sam C. S.	Tamil	
2017	Katha Nayagan	"On Nenappu"	Sean Roldan	Tamil	
2017	Balloon	"Shut Up Pannunga Titbit"	Yuvan Shankar Raja	Tamil	
2017	Balloon	"Shut Up Pannunga"	Yuvan Shankar Raja	Tamil	
2017	Agnyaathavaasi	"Baitikochi Chuste"	Himself	Telugu	
2017	Agnyaathavaasi	"Gaali Vaaluga"	Himself	Telugu	
2017	Agnyaathavaasi	"Dhaga Dhagamaney"	Himself	Telugu	
2017	Thaana Serndha Kootam	"Naana Thaana"	Himself	Tamil	
2017	Thaana Serndha Kootam	"Enge Endru Povadhu"	Himself	Tamil	
2017	Thaana Serndha Kootam	"Thaana Serntha Kootam Title song"	Himself	Tamil	
2017	Velaikkaran	"Karuthavanlaam Galeejaam"	Himself	Tamil	
2017	Velaikkaran	"Iraiva"	Himself	Tamil	
2017	Velaikkaran	"Uyire"	Himself	Tamil	
2017	Velaikkaran	"Idhayane"	Himself	Tamil	
2017	Sakka Podu Podu Raja	"Kalakku Machan"	Silambarasan	Tamil	
2017	Gulaebaghavali	"Guleba"	Vivek-Mervin	Tamil	
2018	Kolamavu Kokila	"Kalyana Vayasu"	Himself	Tamil	
2018	Kolamavu Kokila	"Orey Oru"	Himself	Tamil	
2018	Kolamavu Kokila	"Thittam Poda Theriyala"	Himself	Tamil	
2018	NOTA	"Raja Raja Kula"	Sam C. S.	Tamil	
2018	Kanaa	"Othayadi Paathaiyila"	Dhibu Ninan Thomas	Tamil	
2018	Party	"Kanampoochi"	Premgi Amaren	Tamil	
2018	Ezhumin	"Ezhu Ezhu"	Ganesh Chandrasekaran	Tamil	
2019	Petta	"Marana Mass"	Himself	Tamil	
2019	Petta	"Ilamai Thirumbuthe"	Himself	Tamil	
2019	Petta	"Petta Paraak"	Himself	Tamil	
2019	Ispade Rajavum Idhaya Raniyum	"Kanamma"	Sam C. S.	Tamil	
2019	Jersey	"Adhento Gaani Vunnapaatuga"	Himself	Telugu	
2019	Jersey	"Padhe Padhe"	Himself	Telugu	
2019	Jersey	"Aarambhame Le"	Himself	Telugu	
2019	Jersey	"Marakkavillayae"	Himself	Tamil	Dubbed version
2019	Mr.Local	"Takkunu Takkunu"	Hiphop Tamizha	Tamil	
2019	Thumbaa	"Pudhusaatam"	Himself	Tamil	
2019	Ayogya	"Kanne Kanne"	Sam C.S.	Tamil	
2019	Saaho	"Psycho Saiyaan"	Tanishk Bagchi	Telugu	
2019	Saaho	"Kadhal Psycho"	Tanishk Bagchi	Tamil	
2019	Sixer	"Baa Baa Black Sheep"	Ghibran	Tamil	
2019	Gang Leader	"Gang-u Leader"	Himself	Telugu	
2019	Gang Leader	"Hoyna Hoyna"	Himself	Telugu	
2019	Namma Veetu Pillai	"GaandaKannazhagi"	D. Imman	Tamil	
2019	Puppy	"Superstar song"	Dharan Kumar	Tamil	
2019	Sangathamizhan	"Sandakaari Neethan"	Vivek-Mervin	Tamil	
2019	Vennila Kabaddi Kuzhu 2	"Tiruvizha"	V. Selvaganesh	Tamil	
2019	Dhanusu Raasi Neyargale	"I Want A Girl"	Ghibran	Tamil	
2019	Oh My Kadavule	"Friendship Anthem"	Leon James	Tamil	
2019	Capmaari	"Ummunu Irukkanum Usupethuna"	Siddharth Vipin	Tamil	
2019	Pattas	"Jigidi Killaadi"	Vivek-Mervin	Tamil	
2020	Darbar	"Chumma Kizhi"	Anirudh	Tamil	
2020	Darbar	"Tharam Maara"	Anirudh	Tamil	
2020	Darbar	"Thani Vazhi"	Anirudh	Tamil	
2020	Ranga	"Theeramal"	Ram Jeevan	Tamil	
2020	Kannum Kannum Kollaiyadithaal	"Yelo Pullelo"	Masala Coffee	Tamil	
2020	Dharala Prabhu	"Dharala Prabhu"	Himself	Tamil	
2020	Paava Kadhaigal	"Love Panna Uttranum" (Dad Song)	Himself	Tamil	
2021	Krack	"Balega Tagilavey Bangaram"	Thaman S	Telugu	
2021	Teddy	"Nanbiye"	D. Imman	Tamil	
2021	Ranga	"Theeramal"	Ramjeevan	Tamil	
2021	Master	"Vaathi Coming"	Himself	Tamil	
2021	Master	"Vaathi Raid"	Himself	Tamil	
2021	Master	"Kutti Story"	Himself	Tamil	
2021	Master	"Quit Pannuda"	Himself	Tamil	
2021	Bhoomi	"Thamizhan Endru Sollada"	D. Imman	Tamil	
2021	Sulthan	"Jai Sulthan"	Vivek-Mervin	Tamil	
2021	Jagame Thandhiram	"Bujji"	Santhosh Narayanan	Tamil	
2021	Annabelle Sethupathi	"Ginger Soda"	Krishna Kishor	Tamil	
2021	Doctor	"Chellamma"	Himself	Tamil	
2021	Doctor	"Nenjame"	Himself	Tamil	
2021	Doctor	"So Baby"	Himself	Tamil	
2021	Varun Doctor	"Chittemma"	Himself	Telugu	Dubbed version
2021	Varun Doctor	"So Baby"	Himself	Telugu	Dubbed version
2021	Arasiyalla Idhellam Saadharnamappa	"Knockout song"	Madley Blues	Tamil	
2021	Oh Manapenne	"Bodhai Kaname"	Vishal Chandrashekhar	Tamil	
2021	Enna Solla Pogirai	"Cute Ponnu"	Vivek–Mervin	Tamil	
2021	Kaathu Vaakula Rendu Kaadhal	"Rendu Kadhal"	Himself	Tamil	
2021	Kaathu Vaakula Rendu Kaadhal	"Two Two Two"	Himself	Tamil	
2021	Bommala Koluvu	"Mudhiche Na Sukumari"	Pravin Lakkaraju	Telugu	
2022	Etharkkum Thunindhavan	"Vaada Thambi"	D Imman	Tamil	Sung with GV Prakash Kumar
2022	Radhe Shyam	"Sanchari"	Justin Prabhakaran	Telugu	
2022	RRR	"Natpu"	M. M. Keeravani	Tamil	Dubbed version
2022	Don	"Jalabula Jangu"	Himself	Tamil	
2022	Don	"Private Party"	Himself	Tamil	
2022	DJ Tillu	"Pataas Pilla"	Sricharan Pakala	Telugu	
2022	Beast	"Arabic Kuthu"	Himself	Tamil	
2022	Beast	"Beast Mode"	Himself	Tamil	
2022	Beast	"Halamathi Habibo"	Himself	Telugu	Dubbed version
2022	Beast	"Beast Mode"	Himself	Telugu	Dubbed version
2022	Raw	"Halamathi Habibo"	Himself	Hindi	Dubbed version
2022	Raw	"Beast Mode"	Himself	Hindi	Dubbed version
2022	Kaathu Vaakula Rendu Kaadhal	"Kaathu Vaakula Rendu (Title Track)"	Himself	Tamil	Additional tracks, sung with Santhosh Narayanan for KRK Title Track
2022	Kaathu Vaakula Rendu Kaadhal	"Kanne Kanmaniyae"	Himself	Tamil	
2022	Kaathu Vaakula Rendu Kaadhal	"Azha Thonudhe"	Himself	Tamil	
2022	Vikram	"Vikram (Title Track)"	Himself	Tamil	
2022	Vikram	"Wasted"	Himself	Tamil	
2022	Vikram	"Once Upon A Time"	Himself	Tamil	
2022	Vikram	"Porkanda Singam (EDM Version)"	Himself	Tamil	
2022	Thiruchitrambalam	"Life of Pazham"	Himself	Tamil	
2022	Brahmāstra: Part One – Shiva	"Dancela Bodha Yethuda"	Pritam	Tamil	Dubbed version
2022	Prince	"Bimbilikki Pilapi"	Thaman S	Tamil	
2022	Ori Devuda	"Gundellonaa"	Leon James	Telugu	
2022	Singappenney	"Ezhundhu Vaa"	Kumaran Sivamani	Tamil	Sung with Arivu.
2023	Thunivu	"Chilla Chilla"	Ghibran	Tamil	
2023	Varisu	"Jimikki Ponnu"	Thaman S	Tamil	
2023	Maaveeran	"Scene Ah Scene Ah"	Bharath Sankar	Tamil	
2023	Veeran	"Thunderkaaran"	Hiphop Tamizha	Tamil	Sung with Hiphop Tamizha
2023	Dasara	"Mainaru Vetti Katti"	Santhosh Narayanan	Tamil	Dubbed version; sung with Dhee
2023	Jailer	"Hukum – Thalaivar Alappara"	Himself	Tamil	
2023	Jailer	"Jujubee"	Himself	Tamil	
2023	Jawan	"Zinda Banda"	Himself	Hindi	
2023	Jawan	"Not Ramaiya Vastavaiya"	Himself	Hindi	
2023	Jawan	"Jawan Title Track"	Himself	Hindi	
2023	Jawan	"Vikram Rathore" (English)	Himself	Hindi	
2023	Jawan	"Maasi Theme"	Himself	Hindi	
2023	Jawan	"Vandha Edam"	Himself	Tamil	Dubbed version
2023	Jawan	"Not Ramaiya Vastavaiya"	Himself	Tamil	Dubbed version
2023	Jawan	"Jawan Title Track"	Himself	Tamil	Dubbed version
2023	Jawan	"Hayyoda"	Himself	Tamil	Dubbed version
2023	Jawan	"Vikram Rathore" (English)	Himself	Tamil	Dubbed version
2023	Jawan	"Maasi Theme"	Himself	Tamil	Dubbed version
2023	Jawan	"Dhumme Dhulipelaa"	Himself	Telugu	Dubbed version
2023	Jawan	"Not Ramaiya Vastavaiya"	Himself	Telugu	Dubbed version
2023	Jawan	"Jawan Title Track"	Himself	Telugu	Dubbed version
2023	Jawan	"Vikram Rathore" (English)	Himself	Telugu	Dubbed version
2023	Jawan	"Maasi Theme"	Himself	Telugu	Dubbed version
2023	Paramporul	"Adiyaathi"	Yuvan Shankar Raja	Tamil	
2023	Leo	"Bloody Sweet"	Himself	Tamil	
2023	Leo	"Badass"	Himself	Tamil	
2023	Leo	"Anbenum"	Himself	Tamil	
2023	Leo	"Villian Yaaru"	Himself	Tamil	
2023	Leo	"Im Scared"	Himself	Tamil	
2023	Leo	"Ratata"	Himself	Tamil	
2023	Sesham Mike-il Fathima	"Tatta Tattara"	Hesham Abdul Wahab	Malayalam	
2024	Indian 2	"Come Back Indian"	Himself	Tamil	
2024	Indian 2	"Paaraa"	Himself	Tamil	
2024	Indian 2	"Kadharalz"	Himself	Tamil	
2024	Indian 2	"Dada Aara Re"	Himself	Hindi	Dubbed version
2024	Bade Miyan Chote Miyan	"Bade Miyan Chote Miyan"	Vishal Mishra	Hindi	Sung with Vishal Mishra
2024	Andhagan	"The Andhagan Anthem"	Santhosh Narayanan	Tamil	Sung with Vijay Sethupathi
2024	Devara: Part 1	"Fear Song"	Himself	Telugu	
2024	Devara: Part 1	"Fear Song"	Himself	Hindi	Dubbed version
2024	Devara: Part 1	"Fear Song"	Himself	Tamil	Dubbed version
2024	Devara: Part 1	"All Hail the Tiger"	Himself	Non-album single	
2024	Devara: Part 1	"Red Sea"	Himself	Non-album single	
2024	Vettaiyan	"Manasilaayo"	Himself	Tamil	Sung with Malaysia Vasudevan, (Note: via artificial intelligence) Yugendran and Deepthi Suresh
2024	Vettaiyan	"Hands Up"	Himself	Tamil	
2024	Vettaiyan	"Vaazh Veesum"	Himself	Tamil	
2024	Vettaiyan	"Hands Up"	Himself	Hindi	Dubbed version
2024	Vettaiyan	"Hands Up"	Himself	Kannada	Dubbed version
2024	Vettaiyan	"Hands Up"	Himself	Telugu	Dubbed version
2024	Sorgavaasal	"The End"	Christo Xavier	Tamil	
2025	Vidaamuyarchi	"Thaniye"	Himself	Tamil	
2025	Vidaamuyarchi	"Sawadeeka"	Himself	Tamil	Sung with Anthony Daasan
2025	Vidaamuyarchi	"Pathikichu"	Himself	Tamil	Sung with Yogi Sekar and Amogh Balaji
2025	Dragon	"Rise Of Dragon"	Leon James	Tamil	Co-sung with Nadisha Thomas, El Fé Choir
2025	Leg Piece	"Dikila Dikila"	Bjorn Surrao	Tamil	
2025	Good Bad Ugly	"God Bless U"	G. V. Prakash Kumar	Tamil	
2025	HIT: The Third Case	"Thanu"	Mickey J. Meyer	Telugu	
2025	Kingdom	"Hridayam Lopala", "Anna Antene"	Himself	Telugu	
2025	Andhra King Taluka	"Nuvvunte Chaley"	Vivek-Mervin	Telugu	
2025	Coolie	"Coolie Disco"	Himself	Tamil	
2025	Coolie	"Chikitu"	Himself	Tamil	Sung with T. Rajendar, Arivu
2025	Coolie	"Uyirnaadi Nanbane"	Himself	Tamil	Sung with Sai Smriti
2025	Coolie	"I Am The Danger"	Himself	Tamil	Sung with Siddharth Basrur
2025	Coolie	"Monica"	Himself	Tamil	Sung with Sublahshini, Asal Kolaar
2025	Coolie	"Powerhouse"	Himself	Tamil	Sung with Arivu
2025	Coolie	"Mobsta"	Himself	Tamil	
2025	Coolie	"Coolie Disco"	Himself	Telugu	
2025	Coolie	"Chikitu"	Himself	Telugu	Sung with T. Rajendar, Arivu
2025	Coolie	"Oopirive"	Himself	Telugu	Sung with Sai Smriti
2025	Coolie	"I Am The Danger"	Himself	Telugu	Sung with Siddharth Basrur
2025	Coolie	"Monica"	Himself	Telugu	Sung with Sublahshini
2025	Coolie	"Mobsta"	Himself	Telugu	Sung with Pavan Charan, Siddharth Shandilyasa, Saatvik G Rao, Ritesh G Rao
2025	Coolie	"Coolie Disco"	Himself	Hindi	
2025	Coolie	"Chikitu"	Himself	Hindi	Sung with T. Rajendar, Arivu
2025	Coolie	"Milna Ye Aakhri Hai Kya"	Himself	Hindi	Sung with Sai Smriti
2025	Coolie	"Monica"	Himself	Hindi	Sung with Sublahshini
2025	Coolie	"Mobsta"	Himself	Hindi	Sung with Pavan Charan, Siddharth Shandilyasa, Saatvik G Rao, Ritesh G Rao
2025	Coolie	"Coolie Disco"	Himself	Malayalam	
2025	Coolie	"Chikitu"	Himself	Malayalam	Sung with T. Rajendar, Arivu, Amogh Balaji
2025	Coolie	"Uyirakum Bandhame"	Himself	Malayalam	Sung with Priya Mali
2025	Coolie	"I Am The Danger"	Himself	Malayalam	Sung with Siddharth Basrur
2025	Coolie	"Monica"	Himself	Malayalam	Sung with Sublahshini, Asal Kolaar
2025	Coolie	"Powerhouse"	Himself	Malayalam	Sung with Dinker Kalvala, Amogh Balaji
2025	Coolie	"Mobsta"	Himself	Malayalam	
2025	Kiss	"Thirudi"	Jen Martin	Tamil	
2025	Madharaasi	"Vazhiyiraen"	Himself	Tamil	
2025	Madharaasi	"Unadhu Enadhu"	Himself	Tamil	Sung with Ravi G and Shilpa Rao
2025	Madharaasi	"Usara Uruvi"	Himself	Tamil	Sung with Ravi G
2025	Madharaasi	"Madharaasi Flow"	Himself	Tamil	Sung with Kwame Fyah
2025	Madharaasi	"Thangapoovey"	Himself	Tamil	Sung with Ravi G
2026	Love Insurance Kompany	"Dheema"	Himself	Tamil	
2026	Love Insurance Kompany	"Pattuma"	Himself	Tamil	Sung with Anantha Krishnan
2026	Love Insurance Kompany	"Enakena Yaarum Illaye"	Himself	Tamil	Sung with Anantha Krishnan
2026	Love Insurance Kompany	"Pookatum"	Himself	Tamil	Sung with Bhumi
2026	Love Insurance Kompany	"Vibe Vaasey"	Himself	Tamil	
2026	Jana Nayagan	"Thalapathy Kacheri"	Himself	Tamil	Sung with Vijay, Arivu
2026	Jana Nayagan	"Oru Pere Varalaaru"	Himself	Tamil	Sung With Vishal Mishra
2026	Jana Nayagan	"Raavana Mavandaa"	Himself	Tamil	Chorus
2026	Jana Nayagan	"Adiye En Poonthene"	Himself	Tamil	Sung With Ravi G
2026	DC	"Hangova"	Himself	Tamil	
2026	DC	"Vizhigale"	Himself	Tamil	
2026	DC	"Bum Baa Diga Diga"	Himself	Tamil	Sung with Vedan (rapper)
2026	DC	"Hangova"	Himself	Telugu	Sung with Adithya RK
2026	DC	"Bum Baa Diga Diga"	Himself	Telugu	Sung with Asura
2026	DC	"Hangova"	Himself	Hindi	Sung with Adithya RK
2026	DC	"Bum Baa Diga Diga"	Himself	Hindi	Sung with Asura
2026	The Paradise (film)	"Samaakka"	Himself	Telugu	
2026	The Paradise (film)	"Anjaana Anjaani"	Himself	Telugu	Sung with Sublahshini
2026	The Paradise (film)	"Uyyalo Uyyalo (Male)"	Himself	Telugu	
2026	Jailer 2	"One Sun One Moon And One"	Himself	Tamil	Sung with M.S.Krsna
2026	Jailer 2	"Ala Bolelo"	Himself	Tamil	Sung with Deepthi Suresh, Aparna Harikumar, Niranjana Raman
2026	Jailer 2	"One Name"	Himself	Tamil	Sung with Arunraja Kamaraj, Anirudh Ravichander, Yogisekar, Jagadeesh Kumar, Balraj, Sridhar Sena, Shenbagaraj, Govind Prasad
2026	Jailer 2	"Hukum Reloaded"	Himself	Tamil	
2026	Jailer 2	"Bindass"	Himself	Tamil	Sung with Deepthi Suresh
2026	Jailer 2	"Tiger Muthuvel Pandian"	Himself	Tamil	Sung with MS Krsna
2026	Jailer 2	"Ala Bolelo"	Himself	Telugu	Sung with Deepthi Suresh, Aparna Harikumar
2026	Jailer 2	"One Sun One Moon"	Himself	Telugu	Sung with Inno Genga, MS Krsna
2026	Jailer 2	"Jailer 2 Theme"	Himself	Telugu	Sung with Inno Genga, MS Krsna
2026	Jailer 2	"Bindass"	Himself	Telugu	Sung with Deepthi Suresh
2026	Jailer 2	"Hukum Reloaded"	Himself	Telugu	Sung with Dinkar Kalvala
2026	Jailer 2	"Ala Bolelo"	Himself	Hindi	Sung with Deepthi Suresh, Aparna Harikumar
2026	Jailer 2	"One Sun One Moon"	Himself	Hindi	Sung with Inno Genga, MS Krsna
2026	Jailer 2	"Jailer 2 Theme"	Himself	Hindi	Sung with Inno Genga, MS Krsna
2026	Jailer 2	"Bindass"	Himself	Hindi	Sung with Madhubanti Bagchi
2026	Jailer 2	"Hukum Reloaded"	Himself	Hindi	Sung with Ritesh G. Rao
2026	Ramayana: Part 1	"Ravana Tandavam"	A. R. Rahman	Tamil	Co-sung with G. V. Prakash Kumar

== Independent works and music videos ==
List of Anirudh Ravichander independent works and music video credits
Year	Title	Languages	Featured Artist(s)	Notes
2012	"Sachin Anthem"	Tamil	with Dhanush	Promotional video as an ode to Sachin Tendulkar for health drink company Boost.
2012	"TATA Nano"	Hindi	with Dhanush	Promotional Jingle for Tata Nano by Tata Motors.
2012	"Ai Dil Mere"	Hindi		Promotional video for MTV Rush in collaboration with Bejoy Nambiar.
2014	"Chancey Illa"	Tamil		Promotional video for the city connect campaign by Times of India.
2015	"Enakenna Yaarum Illaye"	Tamil		Single from Aakko Released on Valentine's Day.
2016	"Avalukena"	Tamil	with Srinidhi Venkatesh	Single for Valentine's Day.
2016	"Damkutla Dumkutla"	Tamil	with Shabareesh Varma	Promotional anthem of Tamil Nadu Premier League.
2016	"Cold Water" Diwali Edition	English	featuring Justin Bieber and MØ	Remix of Major Lazer - Cold Water
2017	"Onnume Aagala"	Tamil	with Mali Manoj	Single for Valentine's Day
2017	"Bewajah"	Hindi	with Irene, Srinidhi Venkatesh and Caesar & Loui	India's first vertical video, produced in collaboration with Sony Music India.
2018	"Julie" (Free play)	Tamil		Single for Valentine's Day.
2018	"Going to America"	English	with Anthony Daasan & Nucleya	Promotional song for TotaMyna.
2018	"Kettavano"	Tamil	with Sajith Satya	A single track for the first season of 7UP Madras Gig, produced in collaboration with Sony Music and Knack Studios; composed by Sajith Satya.
2018	"Enakenna Yaarum Illaye" (Zingaroe Remix)	Tamil	with Zingaroe	A bonus track for the first season of 7UP Madras Gig, produced in collaboration with Sony Music and Knack Studios; remixed and produced by Zingaroe.
2018	Myntra's Kids Day Out	Hindi		An advertising jingle produced in collaboration with Myntra for the "Kids Day Out Sale".
2018	"GumOn Groove"	English		A promotional song for GumOn, produced in collaboration with Sony Music India.
2020	"Arivum Anbum"	Tamil	with Ghibran, Kamal Haasan and 9 others	A track released in response to the COVID-19 pandemic crisis in India, produced in collaboration with Think Music India; composed and arranged by Ghibran.
2020	"Its All Gonna Be Okay"	Tamil, Telugu	with Alisha Thomas	An orchestral version of "The Karma Theme" from the film U Turn, released as an ode to frontline workers of the COVID-19 pandemic.
2021	"Nithirai Nila"	Tamil	with Chinmayi, Nakkhul and Sunainaa	An independent single album produced in collaboration with Maii Studios International; composed by Mathews Pulickan.
2021	"Summa Semma Zomato"	Tamil		A promotional jingle produced for Zomato.
2021	"Criminal Crush"	Tamil	with Godson Rudolph, Srinisha Jayaseelan	An independent single album featuring Cooku with Comali fame Ashwin Kumar and Tanya Ravichandran, produced in collaboration with Vels Signature; composed by Godson Rudolph.
2021	"Oosingo"	Tamil	with Arivu	A public service announcement encouraging uptake of the COVID-19 vaccine, produced in collaboration with Sundaram Finance.
2022	Aitha Lakka	Tamil	with Ganesh Chandrasekaran	An independent single featuring Tharshan, produced in association with Lahari Music; composed by Ganesh Chandrasekaran.
2022	"Payani"	Tamil	with Ankit Tiwari	An independent single album directed by Aishwarya Rajinikanth, produced in association with Tips Music; composed by Ankit Tiwari.
2022	"Swipe Right Material"	English, Hindi, Tamil	with Guru Randhawa, Dee MC	A promotional video released as an ode to Tinder India; composed by Kartik Shah.
2022	"Varlaam Vaa.."	Tamil		A promotional jingle produced for the Casagrand Platinum project by Casagrand Builder (Pvt) Ltd.
2023	"7UP Super Duper Refresher"	Tamil		A promotional jingle produced for the "Super Duper Refresher" musical campaign by Pepsico's 7UP India.
2024	"Aao Killelle"	Tamil		An independent single presented by Be Ready Music; composed by Pravin Mani.
2026	''Feel The Thrill''	Hindi	with Neeti Mohan, Jonita Gandhi, Benny Dayal, Siddharth Mahadevan	A theme song written by Heisenberg and Raqueeb Alam; versions were also released in other languages depending on the region.
2026	''Aravindh''	Tamil, Telugu		Marks Anirudh's first independent release under his own label Albuquerque Records; serves as a tribute to his late childhood friend and audio engineer, with lyrics provided by Super Subu.

== Concerts ==
- Once Upon a Time World Tour (2022–2023)
- Hukum World Tour (2024-2025)
- "XV World Tour" (2026-present)
