= Meenakshi Sundareshwar (soundtrack) =

- Soundtrack album cover

Soundtrack album by Justin Prabhakaran
- Released: 1 November 2021
- Genre: Feature film soundtrack
- Length: 37:51
- Language: Hindi
- Label: Sony Music India
- Producer: Justin Prabhakaran

Justin Prabhakaran chronology
Navarasa (2021)	Meenakshi Sundareshwar (2021)	Radhe Shyam (2021)

Meenakshi Sundareshwar is the soundtrack to the 2021 Hindi-language film of the same name directed by debutant Vivek Sonni, and produced by Dharmatic Entertainment, the digital arm of Dharma Productions. The album and film score is composed by noted South Indian film composer Justin Prabhakaran in his Bollywood debut and lyrics were written by Raj Shekhar. The album released through Sony Music India on 1 November 2021 and received positive response from music critics.

== Background ==
Karan Johar, who produced the film under Dharmatic Entertainment, the digital arm of his studio Dharma Productions, roped Justin Prabhakaran for the film's soundtrack and score, after being impressed by his work in Dear Comrade (2019), where he had bought the rights for the Hindi remake. This marks Justin's debut in Bollywood film music scene. Since, the film is set in the backdrop of Madurai, Johar wanted a South Indian musician to create authentic music based on that culture, which will also have a Bollywood touch. In an interview with the Chennai-based magazine Ananda Vikatan, Prabhakaran said that he used Carnatic and South Indian instruments imported from Tamil Nadu, to have this approach and wanted to be liked by all kinds of audiences, irrespective of language barriers.

The album has a running time of 37 minutes, which has 11 tunes; seven songs and four themes composed by Justin Prabhakaran. Raj Shekhar served as the primary lyricists for all the tracks. Benny Dayal, Abhay Jodhpurkar, Madhushree, Shreya Ghoshal, Sadhana Sargam, Romy, Aanandi Joshi, Goldie Sohel, Lavita Lobo amongst others, along with South Indian artists Bjorn Surrao, Mohana Bhogaraju, Hemambika and Anthony Daasan performed the vocals.

== Development ==
While composing the tracks for the musical album, Justin had made use of classical instruments such as santoor, shehnai and veena so as to bring a sense of ethnicity to the soundtrack. Raj Shekhar, the lyricist included few Tamil words in the lyric writing process, as based to the setting, since Vivek Soni wanted a flavour of Tamil Nadu in the songs; Prabhakaran sent few of the tunes to Shekhar with Tamil colloquial words being included with dummy lyrics.

In the process of lyric writing, for the tracks "Tittar Bittar" and "Mann Kesar Kesar", Shekhar used Tanglish lyrics since few Tamil people speak in that way. For the latter, he used the word "Kanmani" (transl. Beloved), as Shekhar loved the sound of the word, which he felt apt to use for the album. Few lines from the tracks were repeatedly occurred twice since the "film is about a couple, so using certain words as a pair also served the theme of the film well". The track "Tu Yahin Hai" depicts the emotions of the couple who are in a long-distance marriage. Shekhar wrote the track, with his experiences about being in a long-distance relationship in mind. About the writing process of "Vaada Machaney", he said, "coding is as poetic as writing a song. Engineers are not less creative in any way". As a result, words about coding and programming were included.

Besides Shekhar, Bjorn Surrao and Anthony Daasan also wrote lyrics for one track each, "Thalaivaa" and "Down and Dirty", and also gave vocals to the tracks. "Thalaivaa", a song serving as a tribute to the actor Rajinikanth, featured in the film as Meenakshi's (Sanya) character being a hardcore fan of the actor. "Down and Dirty" is a reggae track, a popular music genre originated in Jamaica. (Note: Similar to the track "Master the Blaster" from the Tamil film Master (2021), and also with the same singer Bjorn Surrao.) The album further included four instrumental tracks, including the theme music of the film. These themes were picturised on the perspective of the lead pair (Abhimanyu and Sanya), and the separation during the long-distance relationship. The track "First Kiss" is highly inspired from the flute theme composed by Harris Jayaraj for Minnale (2000). "Waltz With Meenakshi", another track from the instrumental score was produced and orchestrated by Budapest Scoring Orchestra, which worked in several Indian and International albums.

== Marketing ==
On the pop-culture event Tudum sponsored by Netflix on 25 September 2021, a musical promo of the film (featuring the song "Tu Yahin Hai") was unveiled through the official YouTube channel of Netflix India. Later, on 1 October 2021, Sony Music India released the full song through the music streaming platforms. The song had vocals by Abhay Jodhpurkar, Madhushree and Resmi Sateesh. Describing about the song, India Today stated it as "a soulful track that will stir your heart". Hindustan Times, gave a positive review praising the composition and the vocals of Madhushree, the female singer, saying it as "pleasant" and "sweet to hear, reminding of old classical songs". The track "Tittar Bittar", featured an animated lyrical video released through Netflix India's official YouTube channel on 15 October 2021, with its audio version being unveiled the same day. The third song "Mann Kesar Kesar", sung by Shashwat Singh and Aanandi Joshi, was released on 25 October. The song is picturised on the couple's wedding in a traditional South Indian culture.

== Track listing ==
No.	Title	Lyrics	Singer(s)	Length
1.	"Mann Kesar Kesar"	Raj Shekhar	Shashwat Singh, Aanandi Joshi, Goldie Sohel	4:05
2.	"Vaada Machaney"	Raj Shekhar	Benny Dayal, Romy	3:23
3.	"Tu Yahin Hai"	Raj Shekhar	Abhay Jodhpurkar, Madhushree, Resmi Sateesh	4:10
4.	"Tittar Bittar"	Raj Shekhar	Romy, Goldie Sohel, Prince Bhatra, Mohana Bhogaraju, Hemambika, Swati Sharma, Chitralekha Sen, Yajat Garg	4:31
5.	"Ratti Ratti Reza Reza"	Raj Shekhar	Abhay Jodhpurkar, Shreya Ghoshal	4:01
6.	"Down and Dirty"	Bjorn Surrao	Bjorn Surrao, Lavita Lobo	3:31
7.	"Thalaivaa"	Anthony Daasan	Anthony Daasan	2:18
8.	"Waltz with Meenakshi"	—	Budapest Scoring Orchestra	2:10
9.	"Looking at the Moon"	—	Lavita Lobo	2:39
10.	"First Kiss"	—	Justin Prabhakaran	3:18
11.	"Meenakshi Sundareshwar Theme"	—	Sadhana Sargam, Vivek Soni	3:41
Total length:				37:51

== Reception ==
Writer Sankhayan Ghosh of Film Companion opined that the album — which has seven songs and four instrumentals — adds flavour and lends authenticity to the film, with a single soundscape: "fresh, lively, with a flair for symphony orchestra and Indian folk, sometimes classical, but also rambunctious and groovy – a dash of A. R. Rahman and a whole lot of Ilaiyaraaja". He further wrote "The album is not only an encouraging sign for Hindi film music, but makes more of an impact when a new composer (albeit from another industry) does it. While Hindi film music has hit a creative low, it's curious how verdant the music in South Indian films has managed to stay, and it was perhaps only a matter of time that Bollywood looked Southward for inspiration. With his strong sense of melody, and his approach to clutter-free arrangements, Prabhakaran's songs are a refreshing change." In addition to the review, Ghosh listed the soundtrack in the year-ender article Best Hindi Film Music of 2021.

A reviewer from The Times of India, praised the soundtrack, calling it as "pleasant to the ears" and stated that the lyrics written by Raj Shekhar "displayed a fine range". Devarsi Ghosh of Scroll.in stated that "the soundtrack has a sharp contrast to the recent albums that churned out in Hindi film music every year" further directing praise to Prabhakaran's "orchestration and composition". Devarsi listed the track "Tittar Bittar" in the Best of 2021 soundtracks (Indian Music) of Scroll.in, and gave a description on the track saying "it entertainingly illustrates the protagonists' cross-cultural aspirations from childhood to adulthood via their teen years within four and a half minutes". Describing about "the highs and lows of Hindi film music in 2021", Devesh Sharma of Filmfare listed the soundtrack and stated that "the unique South Indian touch to the album, makes this extensively different from other Bollywood musicals". Avinash Ramachandran of Cinema Express, stated the album as a "standout" from the entire film, saying "Justin [Prabhakaran] goes on to prove what authenticity can do to a film like this. The sounds and music complement the lush visuals of the setting and keeps the film grounded."

In Sukanya Verma's article for Rediff.com, about Bollywood's Best Songs of 2021, the track "Tittar Bittar" was chosen in the list, for which Verma had stated "Raj Shekhar's quirky lines, Justin Prabhakaran's effervescent tune and a hoard of animated singers shift mood and tempo in such a delightful way on screen and speaker, there's no way you can escape its swaying effect."
