= Master (soundtrack) =

2020 soundtrack album by Anirudh Ravichander

- Soundtrack album cover

Soundtrack album by Anirudh Ravichander
- Released: 15 March 2020
- Recorded: 2019–2020
- Studios: Albuquerque Records, Chennai; Panchathan Record Inn and AM Studios, Chennai
- Genre: Feature film soundtrack
- Length: 26:25
- Language: Tamil
- Label: Sony Music India
- Producer: Anirudh Ravichander

Anirudh Ravichander chronology
Paava Kadhaigal (2020)	Master (2020)	Doctor (2021)
External audio
- Official Audio Jukebox on YouTube

Singles from Master
- 1. "Kutti Story" Released: 14 February 2020; 2. "Vaathi Coming" Released: 10 March 2020; 3. "Vaathi Raid" Released: 14 March 2020

Master is the soundtrack album composed by Anirudh Ravichander, for the 2021 Indian Tamil-language film of the same name, directed by Lokesh Kanagaraj, and produced by Xavier Britto under his production house XB Film Creators, starring Vijay and Vijay Sethupathi. This film marks Anirudh's first collaboration with Lokesh Kanagaraj and his second collaboration with Vijay after Kaththi and third collaboration with Vijay Sethupathi after Naanum Rowdy Dhaan and Petta. The soundtrack album features eight songs written by Arunraja Kamaraj, Gana Balachandar, Arivu, Vignesh Shivan, Vishnu Edavan and Bjorn Surrao, with three of them were released as singles. The tracks were released digitally through Sony Music India on 15 March 2020. The film also features an extended soundtrack album with two songs "Vaathi Kabaddi" and "Master The Blaster" being released on 13 and 14 January 2021. The soundtrack album has been streamed by 1.5 billion times in music platforms, and was the highest-streamed Tamil album of the year 2020.

== Release ==
The soundtrack album features eight tracks, with lyrics written by Arunraja Kamaraj, Gana Balachandar, Arivu, Vignesh Shivan and Vishnu Edavan. Composers Yuvan Shankar Raja and Santhosh Narayanan, also sung one song for this film, while the latter collaborates with Anirudh for the second time after Remo (2016), and the former's first collaboration with the composer. Out of the eight tracks, three of the songs in the soundtrack album were released as singles. The first single, "Kutti Story" written by Arunraja Kamaraj and sung by Vijay, was released on 14 February 2020. The film's second single, named "Vaathi Coming", sung by Anirudh and Gana Balachandar was released on 10 March 2020. The third single "Vaathi Raid", sung by Arivu was released on 14 March 2020. The film's audio launch event was held on 15 March 2020, at The Leela Palace Hotel in Chennai, with a live telecast on Sun TV. The film's cast and crew and other celebrities, attended the event, and was held with closed doors without fans and press due to the COVID-19 pandemic. The album cover from the soundtrack features a blurred image of Vijay staring an intense look resmbling to that of the film's first look poster.

Though the official tracklist consists of 8 songs in total, composer Anirudh Ravichander revealed in the audio launch that, there are 10 tracks in the film with two songs will be released as a part of the extended soundtrack album. As the government allowed permission to resume post-production works of films which were halted due to the COVID-19 pandemic, Anirudh worked on the progress of the film's background score as well for the extended soundtrack. "Vaathi Kabbadi" is the first song to be released in the film's extended soundtrack, which is a remix of the popular theme song "Kabaddi" originally composed by Vidyasagar, from the film Ghilli (2004). After negotitating with Five Star Audio and Ayngaran International, which procured the rights of the original film, Sony Music South released the lyrical video of the song on 13 January 2021. The second song "Master the Blaster" which released on 14 January 2021, is a reggae (Note: A popular music genre that originated in Jamaica in the late 1960s. The track "Master the Blaster" based on this genre, was featured as JD's ringtone in the film. It was eventually credited as "JD Reggae".) track written and performed by independent musician Bjorn Surrao, whom Anirudh had collaborated in Velaikkaran (2017).

The film has JD listening to a reggae track. But Anirudh (Ravichander) wanted to compose one — he gave me the tune and asked me to pen the lyrics. I saw the scene, and began writing the song. Once we put it together, I felt it gave the star a different kind of swag, something fresh and cool. Even when we recorded the song, it had a nice energy. We were happy and chilled out while recording... I mean you usually don't get those vibes.

— Bjorn Surrao, on the composition of the track "Master the Blaster" in an interview with The Times of India.

== Reception ==
=== Critics ===
The album received positive reviews upon its release. Behindwoods rated the album 3.25 out of 5, stating "Master is for masses - Anirudh's music is full of mass appeal as can be expected for a Vijay biggie!" Indiaglitz gave 3.75 out of 5 and quoted "The culmination of good composition, lyrics and singers make the album remarkably entertaining and highly listenable." Moviecrow rated the album 3.5 out of 5, stating that "Anirudh easily delivered his best among his recent outings for the mass films with the vibrant soundtrack led by Vaathi Raid." Writing for The Times of India, Jyothi Prabhakar stated "Many masters have come together to make a musical medley, which is what Master audio tracks are all about. It's got actors and composers singing, directors writing lyrics, folk overtones, percussion, many traditional instruments and drummers beating the life out of a variety of drums. Anirudh Ravichander, the film's composer, has tried to do more of the same, and yet built in a few refreshing tunes."

Vipin Nair of Music Aloud noted the album as "a joyous ride with the highly engaging set of tracks" and gave 4 out of 5 to the album. Kaushik LM of Sify, praised the songs and picturisation in his review for the film. About "Vaathi Coming" he stated that "the song induces a celebratory mood in theaters. The way this song has been staged and built up is fantastic. Vijay's energy and sharp dance moves are infectious." However, he criticised the placement of the song "Kutty Story", which he believed that it had lessened the impact of the film. Avinash Ramachandran of The New Indian Express stated about the soundtrack of the film in Jukebox 2021, saying "The songs of Anirudh burst with an identity, a soul, and while there were a number of much-loved albums in 2021, we saw that songs were slowly dying, and the albums served as resurgence."

=== Audience ===
The album received predominantly positive response from audiences. Upon its initial release on 14 February 2020, the lyrical video of "Kutti Story" song was listed in the third position in the most viewed video worldwide in the video-sharing platform YouTube, with 9 million views within 24 hours. The second song "Vaathi Coming" received phenomenal response, and its lyrical video which released on 10 March, crossed 100 million views on 5 January 2021. Its video song which released in late January 2021, was well received by audiences and crossed 300 million views as of December 2021. The International Football Club used this song for the promotion of the sports club.

Writing for The News Minute, Anjana Shekar added the song "Vaathi Coming" in her article about 7 Tamil Songs That Needed in Your Playlist, as a year-ender special. The Times of India, listed the song in the top position in the 5 Chartbuster Tamil Songs of 2020. It further became the top-streamed songs of Spotify, in their Top Tamil Tracks of 2020. Master topped the most streamed Tamil album of JioSaavn in 2020, with three of its songs, were listed in the Top 5 Most Streamed Tamil Songs of 2020, in its music platform.

The song "Master the Blaster" which released as an additional track received phenomenal response upon release, with the lyrical video crossed 10 million views within four days, and also topped the global iTunes charts. The track also became one of the most streamed song in Spotify, along with "Vaathi Coming", a week during its release, while the album also topped the most streamed Indian albums. As per Spotify Wrapped, a viral marketing campaign by Spotify, the soundtrack became the seventh-most streamed soundtrack in India in 2021. The track "Vaathi Coming" also topped the first position, in the Top Tamil Tracks of 2021, for the second consecutive year. It was the most streamed Tamil album of 2021 in Gaana, with the song "Vaathi Coming" also topping the first position as the most streamed Tamil song. The track "Master the Blaster" was the fifth-most streamed Tamil song of Jiosaavn.

Devarsi Ghosh of Scroll.in listed the soundtrack of the film in the Best of 2021 Soundtracks (Indian Film Music), describing it as "an interesting spin on conventional soundtrack formulae". Writing for the track "Andha Kanna Paathakka", Ghosh stated that "a tribute to the hero played by Vijay, but instead of having the usual anthemic quality, it's a peppy torch song".

== Track listing ==
=== Original ===
The official tracklist of the film released on 15 March 2020, hours before the audio launch. The jukebox of the film released through YouTube on the same day of the launch, whereas the soundtrack album released a day later, on 16 March 2020, through iTunes and other streaming platforms, in order to avoid piracy and illegal downloads.

No.	Title	Lyrics	Singer(s)	Length
1.	"Vaathi Coming"	Gana Balachandar	Gana Balachandar, Anirudh Ravichander	3:50
2.	"Andha Kanna Paathaakaa"	Vignesh Shivan	Yuvan Shankar Raja	3:16
3.	"Kutti Story"	Arunraja Kamaraj	Vijay, Anirudh Ravichander	5:04
4.	"Quit Pannuda"	Vignesh Shivan	Anirudh Ravichander	4:16
5.	"Beat of Master" (Instrumental)			1:15
6.	"Polakattum Para Para"	Vishnu Edavan	Santhosh Narayanan	3:38
7.	"Pona Pogattum"	Vishnu Edavan	C. B. Vinith	1:37
8.	"Vaathi Raid"	Arivu	Arivu, Anirudh Ravichander	3:29
Total length:				26:25

Extended Soundtrack
No.	Title	Lyrics	Singer(s)	Length
1.	"Vaathi Kabaddi" (Originally composed by Vidyasagar and remixed by Anirudh Ravichander)	Pa. Vijay	Maran, Jayamoorthy	3:21
2.	"Master the Blaster"	Bjorn Surrao	Bjorn Surrao	1:33
Total length:				31:19

=== Telugu ===
For the soundtrack of the film's Telugu version, two songs "Chitti Story" and "Master Raid" were released as singles, on 25 December 2020 and 6 January 2021, before the film's official soundtrack being unveiled on 8 January 2021. at a pre-release event held in Hyderabad. The lyrics for the songs were written by Sri Sai Kiran, Krishna Kanth, Anantha Sriram and Mali. Sam Vishal, a contestant of Super Singer 7, made his debut in playback singing through the song "Chiiti Story". (Note: Sam Vishal also crooned the Kannada version of "Kutti Story" which was titled "Putta Story".)

No.	Title	Lyrics	Singer(s)	Length
1.	"Master Coming"	Sri Sai Kiran	Gana Balachander, Anirudh Ravichander	3:49
2.	"Andham Vadi Choopera"	Krishna Kanth	Inno Genga	3:16
3.	"Chitti Story"	Anantha Sriram	Anirudh Ravichander, Sam Vishal	5:03
4.	"Quit Chyyara"	Krishna Kanth	Yashwanth Nag	4:16
5.	"Beat of Master" (Instrumental)			1:14
6.	"Modhalettu"	Krishna Kanth	Saketh Komanduri	3:37
7.	"Letha Letha Gundelu"	Krishna Kanth	Mayukh Velagapudi	1:38
8.	"Master Raid"	Sri Sai Kiran, Mali	Anirudh Ravichander, Arivu	3:29
Total length:				26:22

=== Kannada ===
The soundtrack for the Kannada version had lyrics written by Varadaraj Chikkaballapura and Rathee. One song "Putta Story" was released as a single on 2 January 2021, and the film's album was released on 11 January 2021.

No.	Title	Lyrics	Singer(s)	Length
1.	"Master Coming"	Varadaraj Chikkaballapura	Gana Balachander	3:48
2.	"Avana Kanna Kandaga"	Varadaraj Chikkaballapura	Inno Genga	3:14
3.	"Putta Story"	Varadaraj Chikkaballapura	Sam Vishal	5:01
4.	"Quit Maad Maga"	Varadaraj Chikkaballapura	Sri Krishna	4:16
5.	"Beat of Master" (Instrumental)			1:15
6.	"Dolu Thattu Barabbara"	Varadaraj Chikkaballapura	Saketh Komanduri	3:34
7.	"Manase Karagada"	Varadaraj Chikkaballapura	Mayukh Velagapudi	1:37
8.	"Master Raid"	Raathee	Raathee	3:29
Total length:				26:14

=== Hindi ===
The soundtrack for the Hindi version titled Vijay The Master features lyrics written by Raqueeb Alam, Vimal Kashyap and Akshay Dhawan. (Note: Credited as Akshay The One.) It was released on 12 January 2021.

No.	Title	Lyrics	Singer(s)	Length
1.	"Master Coming"	Raqueeb Alam	Chorus	3:49
2.	"Woh Muskaana Aankhon Ka"	Vimal Kashyap	Sreerama Chandra	3:14
3.	"Chhoti Story"	Raqueeb Alam	Nakash Aziz	5:03
4.	"Quit Karna"	Vimal Kashyap	Yashwanth Nag	4:16
5.	"Beat of Master" (Instrumental)			1:15
6.	"Dhol Tash Baja Baja"	Vimal Kashyap	Saketh Komanduri	3:34
7.	"Roshni Se Bhar Utah"	Vimal Kashyap	Mayukh Velagapudi	1:37
8.	"Master Raid"	Akshay Dhawan	Akshay Dhawan	3:29
Total length:				26:18

== Background score ==
Master

Film score by Anirudh Ravichander
- Released: 5 February 2021
- Recorded: 2019–2020
- Studios: Albuquerque Records, Chennai; Panchathan Record Inn and AM Studios, Chennai
- Genre: Film score
- Length: 26:07
- Language: Tamil
- Label: Sony Music India
- Producer: Anirudh Ravichander
External audio
- Film Score on YouTube

Lokesh Kanagaraj watched the final mix of the film score composed by Anirudh, before they attended the film's promotional event in Hyderabad, and praised his work stating that the "background score will take the film to the next level". After the response received for the film's musical score, Anirudh worked on mastering the film's tunes in order to release it as a separate soundtrack. The original soundtrack featuring the film score was released by Sony Music South on 5 February 2021. The "JD Intro" background music was featured during the title credits of Beast (2022), Varisu (2023), Leo (2023), The Greatest of All Time (2024) and Jana Nayagan (2026).

No.	Title	Length
1.	"JD Intro"	1:21
2.	"Bhavani Theme"	1:22
3.	"JD The Alcoholic"	1:58
4.	"College Election"	1:26
5.	"College Fight"	2:19
6.	"JD Badass Theme"	1:17
7.	"Pona Pogattum Sad"	1:55
8.	"The Letter"	1:18
9.	"Interval Fight"	2:11
10.	"I'm Waiting"	1:18
11.	"Jail Chaos"	4:15
12.	"Bucket List"	0:50
13.	"Archery Fight"	2:15
14.	"JD vs Bhavani"	2:17
Total length:		26:07

== Awards and nominations ==
Award	Date of ceremony	Category	Nominee(s)	Result	Ref.
Mirchi Music Awards South	9 March 2022	Album of The Year – Tamil	Master	Won	
Mirchi Music Awards South	9 March 2022	Song of The Year – Tamil	"Vaathi Coming"	Nominated	
Mirchi Music Awards South	9 March 2022	Music Composer of The Year – Tamil	Anirudh Ravichander – ("Vaathi Coming")	Nominated	
Mirchi Music Awards South	9 March 2022	Music Composer of The Year – Tamil	Anirudh Ravichander – ("Kutti Story")	Nominated	
Mirchi Music Awards South	9 March 2022	Listeners Choice Album of The Year – Tamil	Master	Nominated	
Mirchi Music Awards South	9 March 2022	Listeners Choice Song of The Year – Tamil	"Kutti Story"	Nominated	
Mirchi Music Awards South	9 March 2022	Listeners Choice Song of The Year – Tamil	"Vaathi Coming"	Nominated	
Mirchi Music Awards South	9 March 2022	Viral Song of The Year – Tamil	"Vaathi Coming"	Won	
Mirchi Music Awards South	9 March 2022	Youth Icon of The Year	Anirudh Ravichander	Won	
