= Vaathi Coming =

2020 song from Master

- Official song cover

Single by Anirudh Ravichander and Gana Balachandar

from the album Master
- Language: Tamil
- Released: 10 March 2020 (Single); 28 January 2021 (Video song)
- Recorded: 2019–2020
- Studio: Albuquerque Records, Chennai; Panchathan Record Inn and AM Studios, Chennai; Threedots Film Studio, Kerala; Offbeat Music Ventures, Chennai
- Genre: Filmi, folk music, dance, Indian pop
- Length: 3:50
- Label: Sony Music
- Composer: Anirudh Ravichander
- Lyricist: Gana Balachander
- Producer: Anirudh Ravichander

Master track listing
- 1. "Vaathi Coming"; 2. "Andha Kanna Paathaakaa"; 3. "Kutti Story"; 4. "Quit Pannuda"; 5. "Beat of Master"; 6. "Polakattum Para Para"; 7. "Pona Pogattum"; 8. "Vaathi Raid"; 9. "Vaathi Kabaddi"; 10. "Master the Blaster"

Music video
- "Vaathi Coming" on YouTube

"Vaathi Coming" (transl. Master is coming) is an Indian Tamil-language song composed by Anirudh Ravichander for the soundtrack album of the 2021 film Master. Anirudh rendered the song along with Gana Balachandar, who also penned its lyrics. The song was released as a single from the film by Sony Music India on 10 March 2020, with its lyrical version unveiled the same day and the video song was released on 28 January 2021.

== Music video ==
The lyrical version of the song also featured a promotional music video performed by the singers, Anirudh and Gana Balachander and also the making of the song and its video. The video song which released on 28 January 2021, features Vijay dancing for the single, which is choreographed by Dinesh Kumar. It garnered lot of views for its choreography and picturisation.

== Reception ==
=== Audience reactions ===
The shoulder drop step from the song became a signature step and was recreated by millions, in many short-video and social media platforms. It was first done by Anirudh Ravichander, in the promotional video and also at the film's audio launch. Later, many Indian celebrities such as Shilpa Shetty, Nazriya Nazim, Varalaxmi Sarathkumar and Genelia D'Souza recreated the signature step which went viral through social media. This song was recreated by Summit, a 7-year old contestant, at the reality show, the fourth season of Super Dancer, which aired on Sony TV. Along with Summit, Shilpa Shetty, Anurag Basu and Geeta Kapur, who were the judges of the show, grooved to the song.

Anirudh Ravichander, shared the video of residents across UK grooving to the song on the streets, whilst abiding the social distancing norms over the COVID-19 pandemic. The International Football Club used this song for the promotion of the sports club.

At the test match between India and England held in Chennai in February 2021, Indian cricketer Ravichandran Ashwin grooved to the song "Vaathi Coming" when it is played during the test match, which went viral across social media platforms; then Ashwin, along with Kuldeep Yadav and Hardik Pandya, did the shoulder drop step in a cover video posted on 19 February 2021. Harbhajan Singh did the signature step during the shooting of Friendship, his debut as a lead actor, as did David Warner. Cricketer Suresh Raina grooved to the song at the Behindwoods Gold Medals awards held on 7 March 2021, where he was awarded The Global Icon of Inspiration: Sports, by Master director Lokesh Kanagaraj.

=== Critical response ===
Behindwoods reviewed the song as "a loop-worthy dance track". Indiaglitz called the song as "energetic" and further added it as a "celebration for the fans". Moviecrow called the track as "a pedestrian listen" which is because of the "overused tunes especially in the past two albums of Anirudh". Jyothi Prabhakar of The Times of India, called the song as "worth the grab for the infectious energy that it brings", but disappointed that the song "had been converted into a proper 'kuthu' track".

== Records ==
The lyrical version was uploaded to YouTube on 10 March 2020, and on 5 January 2021, it crossed 100 million views. The video version was released on 28 January and became the 13th most viewed video song in the first 24 hours of its release. On 18 June 2021, the song crossed more than 200 million views through YouTube, and became the most viewed song of Vijay, surpassing "Aalaporaan Thamizhan" which had 145 million views. Upon crossing 200 million views, Anirudh Ravichander sent a special thanks note to the viewers about the song's success.

== Chart performance ==
Anjana Shekar of The News Minute, added the song in her article about 7 Tamil Songs That Needed in Your Playlist, as a year-ender special. The Times of India, listed the song in the top position in the 5 Chartbuster Tamil Songs of 2020. It became the top-streamed songs of Spotify in their Top Tamil Tracks of 2020. It became the most played song in music streaming services such as Spotify, Amazon Music, Gaana, JioSaavn and others.

== Track listing ==
The track "Vaathi Coming" was released as "Master Coming" in Telugu (lyrics written by Sri Sai Kiran), Kannada (lyrics written by Varadaraj Chikkaballapura) and Hindi (lyrics written by Raqueeb Alam) languages, sung by the same singers in Telugu and Kannada, except for the Hindi version.

Digital download

1. "Vaathi Coming" (Tamil) - 3:50
2. "Master Coming" (Telugu) - 3:49
3. "Master Coming" (Kannada) - 3:48
4. "Master Coming" (Hindi) - 3:49
