= Jagadeesh Kanna =

Indian actor, writer, director, and entrepreneur

- Born: 22 September 1988 (age 38); Thanjavur, Tamil Nadu, India
- Education: Hindustan University; IIT Madras
- Occupations: Actor; playwright; film director; entrepreneur; author
- Years active: 2015–present
- Known for: Founder of Vaayusastra Aerospace

Jagadeesh Kanna (born 22 September 1988) is an Indian stage actor, playwright, author, film director, and entrepreneur. He is the author of the book Science with Young Hanuman and is best known for writing and directing The Stealer, an experimental film that utilizes the Rashomon effect.

Kanna made his acting debut in the crowd-funded Tamil film Naalu Peruku Nalladhuna Edhuvum Thappilla (2017). He is the founder and CEO of Vaayusastra Aerospace, an educational firm incubated under IIT Madras's RTBI that combines theatre arts with aeronautical science.

== Education ==
Kanna holds a bachelor's degree in aeronautics from Nehru Institute of Engineering and Technology, Coimbatore. He obtained a master's degree in aeronautical engineering from Hindustan University, and attended IIT Madras as a PhD coursework student in creative writing within the Humanities and Sciences department.

== Career ==
=== Entrepreneurship and Research ===
As CEO of Vaayusastra Aerospace, Kanna developed a curriculum combining theatre and aeronautics for children. Under his leadership, the company achieved "Space Tutor" status from ISRO and partnered with the Government of Tamil Nadu's "Naan Mudhalvan" program to train engineering students in drone technology.

In 2025, Kanna became the CTO of "Drone Hub," an edutainment center at VGP Wonder World. He heads the R&D unit contributing to research in aerostats, space suits, and space food.

==== Selected Research Publications ====
- Rawal, S., Madhubalan, A., Manikandan, P., & Kanna, J. (2022). "Study on the Design of Space Gloves and EVA Suits with Future Challenges". Textile & Leather Review, 5, 18–30. doi:10.31881/TLR.2021.25.
- Mahalakshmi, D., Sankarganesh, P., & Kanna, J. (2025). "Formulation... of a Calcium-enriched, Millet-based Freeze-dried Yogurt Mix... for Long-term Space Missions". Asian Journal of Dairy and Food Research. doi:10.18805/ajdfr.DR-2307.
- Manikanda Bharath, K., et al. (2026). "Geo-pedological controls on soil erosion vulnerability... in diverse landscapes of Tamil Nadu". Remote Sensing of Environment, 332. doi:10.1016/j.rse.2025.115098.

=== Entertainment ===
Kanna began his stage career with The Little Theatre (2009–2012) and performed in Grand Rehearsals at The Hindu Theatre Fest in 2015. He wrote the play Never Give Up (2016), inspired by Olympian Derek Redmond.

In film, Kanna acted in Naalu Peruku Nalladhuna Edhuvum Thappilla (2017) and worked as an assistant director on Sarvam Thaala Mayam (2019) and 90 ML (2019). He directed the short film Oru Cup Coffee, dealing with euthanasia, and the feature film The Stealer.

== Literary Works ==
Kanna writes "Sky High," a fortnightly column for The Hindu Young World, which re-imagines the Ramayana through the lens of aeronautical science. These were compiled into the book Science with Young Hanuman (2025).

=== "Sky High" Articles ===
Articles published in The Hindu Young World
Title	Date	Description	Ref
Take to the skies	8 Feb 2021	Meghnath's first flying lesson.	
Of flying and freedom	22 Feb 2021	Ravana's flying machines.	
Lessons in the air	7 Mar 2021	Hanuman learns about air mass.	
On top of the world	26 Mar 2021	Leaving Earth's atmosphere.	
The power of perseverance	5 Apr 2021	Importance of knowledge in flying.	
The real power	26 Apr 2021	Energy from minute elements.	
The science behind his flight	7 Jun 2021	Aerodynamics of Hanuman's flight.	
Power of the pull	21 Jun 2021	Moon's orbit and gravity.	
Ready for take off	9 Jul 2021	Secrets behind Lord Vishnu's weapons.	
It's all in the shape	30 Jul 2021	Aerofoils and wings.	
Sailing across space	23 Aug 2021	New ways of flying.	
Designing a simple spaceship	4 Sep 2021	Buoyancy and Venus.	
The light of knowledge	18 Sep 2021	Electrolysis lesson from Sukracharya.	
Ready for take off!	25 Oct 2021	Making rockets at home.	
Across space and time	13 Dec 2021	Communicating with ethereal beings.	
Travelling through time	5 Jan 2022	Wormholes and communication.	
Inspired by Nature	17 Jan 2022	Wright Brothers and nature.	
Swimming in the air	20 Feb 2022	Sampati teaches flying.	
Jatayu's epic flight	7 Mar 2022	Story of Jatayu's wings.	
Magnetic attraction	21 Mar 2022	Lecture on magnetism.	
When things heat up	2 Apr 2022	How Sampati's wings burnt.	
Energy and Quantum physics	4 Jun 2022	Meghnath meets Shakti.	
Unravelling a surprise	4 Jul 2022	Building an air-powered vehicle.	
Can stones float	25 Jul 2022	Curse on Nala and Nila.	
On Stealth mode	29 Aug 2022	Stealth technology.	
Balancing act	5 Sep 2022	Centre of gravity.	
Forces that power us	23 Sep 2022	Different types of forces.	
Weapons of power	14 Oct 2022	Goddess Durga's weapons.	
The potential of power	5 Nov 2022	Building a rocket launcher.	
Smoke effect	17 Nov 2022	Illusionary tricks.	
electrifying invention	2 Dec 2022	Wireless electricity.	
Nature, the teacher	15 Dec 2022	Inventions inspired by Nature.	
Getting crafty	21 Jan 2023	Principles of war.	
A matter of favouritism	9 Feb 2023	Quantum physics connection.	
The artist in the sky	27 Feb 2023	Science behind Nature's art.	
Churning the 'matter'	7 Mar 2023	Black hole phenomenon.	
A baffling mystery	31 Mar 2023	Origin of matter.	
Drawing with music	14 Apr 2023	Sound vibrations.	
A view like no other	28 Apr 2023	Supersonic flight and vortex.	
Celestial relationships	9 Jun 2023	Moon and stars.	
On a lunar mission	24 Jun 2023	Remote exploration of Moon.	
View from space	8 Jul 2023	Sputnik and Moon rabbit.	
All in the shape	21 Jul 2023	Aerodynamics.	
A hibernating mentor	18 Aug 2023	Jambhavan's hibernation.	
The story of Jambhavan	8 Sep 2023	Meeting Jambhavan.	
A musical interlude	23 Sep 2023	Music and spacecraft.	
Powered by air	27 Oct 2023	Kinds of aircraft.	
A battle and two boons	16 Nov 2023	Dasaratha and Shambara.	
Enter the twins	1 Dec 2023	Science behind archery.	
The Prince of Ayodhya	6 Jan 2024	Thrust vectoring and guided missiles.	
Of universes and multiverses	2 Feb 2024	Magnitude of the universe.	
Learning of the Raman Effect	22 Feb 2024	Sir C.V. Raman.	
Earthy matters	29 Mar 2024	Planet's wonders.	
Spheres that spin	26 Apr 2024	Mysteries of the Solar System.	
Ready for the race	26 Jun 2024	Test by Prahasta.	
The first challenge	12 Jul 2024	Stormy winds and turbulence.	
Winging it	16 Aug 2024	Piloting craft using Nature.	
Fight over a flying machine	20 Sep 2024	Pushpaka Vimana story.	
A question of frequency	25 Oct 2024	Resonance and oscillations.	
Preparing for war	29 Nov 2024	Ravana and Kubera.	
The glowing pillars of Alakapuri	26 Jan 2025	Kubera's city.	
The wonders of Alakapuri	28 Feb 2025	Science in daily life.	
Ravana's weapons	28 Mar 2025	Learning about weapons.	
Ravana wins the Pushpaka Vimana	13 Jun 2025	Ravana takes the vehicle.	
The secret of the vajrayudha	18 Jul 2025	Indra's weapon and lightning.	
The wind beneath their wings	5 Sep 2025	Making a drone.	
The secret of the curve	17 Oct 2025	Torque and drones.	
Learning from the ants	21 Nov 2025	Bio mimicry.	
The secret of Jambavan’s palace	12 Dec 2025	Keplers laws.	
Here comes the Sun	16 Jan 2026	Science of sankranti.	
The colours of light	16 Feb 2026	National Science day	
The shadows of space	20 Mar 2026	Dark matter	
Sailing in the cosmic ocean	17 Apr 2026	Alcubierre drive	
Watchful forest of Ayodhya	5 Jun 2026	Surveillance Grid	
When a Machine Learns	24 Jul 2026	Machine Learning	
The First Quest of Rama	21 Aug 2026	BioMimicry	
The First Encounter by Rama	18 Sep 2026	BioMimicry for Defence and Offence	

== Filmography ==
Feature Films, Short Films, and Series
Year	Title	Director	Writer	Actor	Role	Notes	Ref
2015	Oru Cup Coffee	Yes	Yes	No		Short film	
2017	Naalu Peruku Nalladhuna Edhuvum Thappilla	No	No	Yes	Johnny	Feature film	
2022	Kadhal Neeye	No	No	Yes	Warrior	Music Video (Lyricist)	
2022	Hey Babe	No	No	No		Lyricist	
2024	The Stealer	Yes	Yes	No		Feature film	
2024	Call Kill Repeat	No	No	Yes	Kumar	Micro Series	
TBA	Thiraikadal	No	No	Yes		Lyricist, Unreleased	
