= Doctor (soundtrack) =

2021 soundtrack album by Anirudh Ravichander

- Soundtrack Album Cover

Soundtrack album by Anirudh Ravichander
- Released: 2 October 2021
- Recorded: 2020–2021
- Genre: Feature film soundtrack
- Length: 14:32
- Language: Tamil
- Label: Sony Music India
- Producer: Anirudh Ravichander

Anirudh Ravichander chronology
Master (2020)	Doctor (2021)	Naai Sekar (2022)
External audio
- Audio Jukebox on YouTube

Singles from Doctor
- 1. "Chellamma" Released: 24 July 2020; 2. "Nenjame" Released: 28 August 2020; 3. "So Baby" Released: 26 February 2021; 4. "Soul of Doctor" Released: 27 September 2021

Doctor is a soundtrack album composed by Anirudh Ravichander for the 2021 film of the same name. The film marks Anirudh's sixth collaboration with Sivakarthikeyan and second collaboration with Nelson Dilipkumar. All the tracks in the film were released as singles, with "Chellamma" being the first song to be released, received viral response crossing more than 100 million views on YouTube. The original soundtrack album which featured four tracks in total was unveiled by Sony Music India on 2 October 2021.

== Release ==
The film marked Anirudh's seventh collaboration with Sivakarthikeyan after 3, Ethir Neechal, Maan Karate, Kaaki Sattai, Remo and Velaikkaran and second collaboration with Nelson Dilipkumar after Kolamavu Kokila. In February 2020, the film's soundtrack rights were purchased by Sony Music India.

Work on the film's soundtrack began during June 2020, when government allowed to resume post-production works which were affected due to the nationwide lockdown due to COVID-19. The first song "Chellamma" was recorded during this intermediate period and was released as the first single. The promotion for the single was done in an interesting way, where an announcement video about the song released on 22 July 2020, featuring Anirudh, Sivakarthikeyan and Nelson. The song was penned by Sivakarthikeyan which had lines about TikTok ban, himself and was sung by Anirudh and Jonita Gandhi. It was released on 24 July 2020, through music streaming platforms and YouTube.

Following the response to the track, the makers unveiled the second single titled "Nenjame", a montage track, on 28 August 2020. A promotional video directed by Nelson and filmed by Vijay Kartik Kannan, the film's cinematographer, the video was shot at the Edward Elliot's Beach in Chennai adhering to the COVID-19 safety guidelines. Sivakarthikeyan and Priyanka Arul Mohan appeared in the music video which was shot in monochrome. It features vocals by the composer Anirudh Ravichander, whilst lyrics by Mohan Rajan.

The team came up with another announcement video on 22 February 2021, after the composer tweeted about the single, the previous day. Anirudh Ravichander later described it as being a mix of classical and western fusion in the video, which later becoming titled as "So Baby". The song was released on 26 February 2021. In March 2021, Anirudh Ravichander tweeted that he is working for the fourth song sung by Arivu, which will mark their second collaboration after "Vaathi Raid" from Master (2021). This song is scheduled to be released as the fourth single from the film, however did not make it to the final track list.

"Soul of Doctor", a theme track featured in the trailer received unanimous praise from the listeners, and owing to the response, the makers released the track as a separate single from the album on 27 September 2021. The song featured a classical music-background score with Jathi in the beginning of the track, similar to the verses featured in "So Baby". While the original song was voiced by violinist, Ananthakrrishnan, who worked in the composer's Albuquerque Records music studio, "Soul of Doctor" was sung by Niranjana Ramanan.

== Reception ==
The album received positive response from critics & viewers praising two singles from the album “So Baby” & “Chellamma”. The first single "Chellamma" received positive response from critics and audiences, and went viral upon its release, crossing 50 million views as of October 2020. "Chellamma" was listed on the Top 5 Chartbuster Songs of 2020 from The Times of India and 7 Songs Needed in Your Playlist: A Yearender Special by Anjana Shekhar of The News Minute. Shekhar further stated that the song is considered as a "perfect dance number that you can groove for parties". In March 2021, the song has crossed more than 100 million views in YouTube.

"So Baby", the third song from the album, was hailed by listeners and music critics praised Anirudh for handling the mix of western and classical style sound. Thinkal Menon of The Times of India said that "the rare fusion of classical and western makes the song more enjoyable". Karthik Srinivasan of Milliblog, in his weekly review stated the song as "vibrant" and praised the instrumentation of the track which works in favour of it. In addition, the song also became a viral hit on YouTube. However, netizens criticised Anirudh saying that he had plagiarized the tunes from Taio Cruz's "Break Your Heart".

The music and score received positive reviews from critics, with Haricharan Pudipeddi of Hindustan Times said that "it holds the film together". A reviewer from Sify stated: "Music by Anirudh is another biggest strength of the film although there are only three songs. The music composer elevates the film with his efficient background score." A reviewer from Moviecrow stated that "Anirudh's music has been complimenting the film even before it made it to the screens and it does handhold the film to success".

== Chart performance ==
Chart	Song	Peak position	Ref.
Radio Mirchi Top 20	"Chellamma"	1	
Radio Mirchi Top 20	"So Baby"	1	
Radio Mirchi Top 20	"Nenjame"	3	

== Soundtrack listing ==
Original Tracklist
No.	Title	Lyrics	Singer(s)	Length
1.	"Chellamma"	Sivakarthikeyan	Anirudh Ravichander, Jonita Gandhi	3:56
2.	"Nenjame"	Mohan Rajan	Anirudh Ravichander	4:16
3.	"So Baby"	Sivakarthikeyan	Anirudh Ravichander, Ananthakkrishnan	4:12
4.	"Soul of Doctor"		Niranjana Ramanan	1:04
Total length:				12:28

Telugu Tracklist
No.	Title	Lyrics	Singer(s)	Length
1.	"Chittemma"	Srinivasa Moorthy	Anirudh Ravichander, Jonita Gandhi	3:56
2.	"Bandhame"	Rajashri Sudhakar	Adithya RK	4:16
3.	"So Baby"	Rajashri Sudhakar	Saketh Komanduri, Anirudh Ravichander, Ananthakkrishnan	4:12
4.	"Soul Of Doctor (instrumental)"		Niranjana Ramanan	1:04
Total length:				12:28

Hindi Tracklist
No.	Title	Lyrics	Singer(s)	Length
1.	"Chellamma"	Nishant Singh	Harshavardhan Wavre, Kasturi Wavre	3:56
2.	"Gudiya Re"	Vaibhav Joshi, Raqueeb Alam	Abhay Jodhpurkar	4:16
3.	"So Baby"	Vaibhav Joshi, Raqueeb Alam	Abhay Jodhpurkar	4:12
4.	"Soul of Doctor"		Niranjana Ramanan	1:04
Total length:				12:28

== Background score ==
Doctor

Film score by Anirudh Ravichander
- Released: 16 October 2021
- Recorded: 2020-2021
- Genre: Film score
- Length: 17:27
- Language: Tamil
- Label: Sony Music
- Producer: Anirudh Ravichander
External audio
- Film Score on YouTube

The original soundtrack was released by Sony Music on 16 October 2021, coinciding Anirudh Ravichander's birthday.

No.	Title	Length
1.	"Doctor Theme"	0:49
2.	"The Family"	1:47
3.	"Varun Intro"	1:46
4.	"Hand Game"	1:53
5.	"The Twins"	2:19
6.	"Metro Train Fight"	2:05
7.	"Varun Fights"	0:50
8.	"Terry Theme"	1:36
9.	"Daughter Feels"	2:18
10.	"Climax Fight"	2:27
Total length:		17:50
