= Vaayusastra Aerospace =

Indian Edtech company

- Company type: Private
- Industry: Aeronautics and Aerospace Education
- Founded: 2018; 8 years ago
- Founders: Jagadeesh Kanna; Gobi Krishna
- Headquarters: Chennai, India
- Services: Educational Technology, Aerospace engineering
- Website: vaayusastra.com

Vaayusastra Aerospace is an educational firm combining theatre and aeronautics, with the goal of taking aeronautical knowledge to every village in India. Vaayusastra Aerospace is incubated and funded under IIT Madras's Rural Technology and Business Incubator (RTBI). Vaayusastra publish a fortnightly column that combines storytelling with aeronautical science in The Hindu Young World Magazine. Vaayusastra creates theatre and hands-on activity based educational curriculum for school and college students in the field of Aeronautics and Aerospace. The company is headquartered in Chennai. Its services help up to 100,000 customers from 2018.

The Aerospace and Aviation Sector Skill Council of the National Skill Development Corporation India identified Vaayusastra as the best training partner in 2022, and it was recognised as the space tutor of ISRO. and Vaayusastra was featured in a Tamil hybrid web series titled Theervai Nokki for their works and featured several times in IIT Madras Incubation Cell articles related to aeronautics and education.

== History ==
Vaayusastra Aerospace was founded by Jagadeesh Kanna and Gobi Krishna in 2018 Initially in 2018, the company started with hands-on education-based services to school children. In the 2020 pandemic period, Vaayusastra started online programs for children and reached 8 countries; later, in second wave of pandemic in 2021, they started to conduct extensive programs for college students which focused on various aerospace research areas in aerostats, aerodynes, space suit, cube satellites and rocket control systems. Then got an opportunity from the Tamil Nadu Skill Development Corporation's (TNSDC) Naan Mudhalvan project and became a Drone training partner for Government of Tamil Nadu initiative TNSDC Naan Mudhalvan Program to train 3600 Engineering college students.
