= Resmi Sateesh =

Indian playback singer and actress

Resmi Sateesh is an Indian playback singer and actor from Kerala predominantly known for her songs in the Malayalam films. She has also acted in the movie 22 Female Kottayam and worked as location sound recordist for the movie Makaramanju directed by Lenin Rajendran .

== Early life and education ==
Born in Parassala, Reshmi studied classical music from the age of six under the tutelage of Muthiah Bhagavathar from Tamil Nadu after her music studies under Alleppey Sreekumar. She has also studied "Audiography" at the Satyajit Ray Film & Television Institute in Calcutta. She holds B.Sc. in physics masters in Social Work from the University of Calicut. She is also known for her stage performance and has performed at several international events including Kochi-Muziris Biennale

== Discography ==
Year	Title	Song	
2011	Urumi	Chalanam Chalanam ... Appaa Nammade	
2011	Chaappa Kurishu	Oru Naalum Kaanaathe ...	
2012	Bachelor Party	Kappa Kappa	
2012	Friday 11.11.11 Alappuzha	Aaraaro Aaromale	
2012	Matinee	Ayalathe veettile	
2012	Sound Thoma	Ambili Maame ...	
2012		Move Letz the body	Rasputin
2023	King of Kotha	Kotha Raja	with Dabzee, Asal Kolaar & Roll Rida

== Singles ==
- Ini Varunnoru Thalamurakk
- Thok Tholkum Kalam
