= Naalu Peruku Nalladhuna Edhuvum Thappilla =

2017 Indian film by Dinesh Selvaraj

- Poster
- Directed by: Dinesh Selvaraj
- Written by: Annakili Selvaraj
- Starring: Karthik Raj; Jagadeesh Kanna; Shariya; Evan Shri
- Cinematography: Bagath Singh
- Edited by: Xavier Thilak
- Music by: Navin; Bjorn Surrao
- Production company: Alpha Studios
- Distributed by: Alpha Studios
- Release date: 31 March 2017
- Running time: 121 minutes
- Country: India
- Language: Tamil

Naalu Peruku Nalladhuna Edhuvum Thappilla (transl. Nothing is wrong if some people benefit from it) is a 2017 Tamil-language heist film written and directed by debutant Dinesh Selvaraj. It is a crowdfunded film produced by Alpha Studios. Alpha Studios themselves did the distribution of the film. The film features Karthik Raj, Jagadeesh Kanna, Shariya, and Evan Shri in the lead roles. Navin and Bjorn Surrao composed the film score.

== Cast ==
- Karthik Raj as Anil
- Jagadeesh Kanna as Johnny
- Shariya as Prabhu
- Evan Shri as Sreedhar
- Arul Jothi as Pon Vinayagam
- Vaiydyanadhan as Dharmalingam

== Production ==
The film was reported in June 2017 when it was revealed that Karthik Raj, who had appeared in Office was making the debut in a venture produced by Alpha Studios with Crowd Funded resources along with Chennai's theatre fame Jagadeesh Kanna, Shariya and Evanshri in lead roles. The project, titled Naalu Peruku Nalladhuna Edhuvum Thappilla, was to be directed by Dinesh Selvaraj, while Navin and Bjorn Surrao (Debut) would score the film's music.

Nalladhuna Edhuvum Thappilla,had been bankrolled by a group of people. The director of the movie Dinesh Babu Selvaraj, who worked as an assistant to Mani Ratnam from Alai Payuthey to Kadal, had turned director with Naalu Peruku Nalladhuna Edhuvum Thappilla. The film, which was initially titled Boomerang, later became NPNET: “It was meant to signify that karma comes to hit back at you in strange way” said the director. Dinesh planned to collect amounts of ₹1,000 or ₹2,000 from a lot of people and give them tickets in return, but discovered it was more feasible to get investors who would pump in ₹1 lakh each. He stated “in reality, it’s not such a huge amount for some. So we thought we’ll go ahead and take a risk.” His total budget came to around ₹1.25 crore. In fact, SPB Charan was very interested in the script. He asked Dinesh to wait until he got done with two other project, but, after some time, Dinesh decided to go ahead with the project by himself. The filming was completed in mid 2015.

== Soundtrack ==
All music is composed by Navin and Bjorn Surrao.

Track listing
No.	Title	Lyrics	Singer(s)	Length
1.	"Kullanari Kootam"	Kalai Sai Arun	Anirudh Ravichander	3:11
Total length:				3:11

== Critical reception ==
Baradwaj Rangan of Film Companion wrote, "A not-bad noir thriller about a small crook's attempts to pull off the big one. Look away from the sometimes aggressively showy filmmaking and an ill-advised stab at screwball comedy in the second half (involving a Sivaji Ganesan fan), and you have some solid writing.”
