= Kutti Story =

2020 song from Master

- Official song cover

Single by Anirudh Ravichander and Vijay

from the album Master
- Language: Tamil
- Released: 14 February 2020 (Single); 20 January 2021 (Video song)
- Recorded: 2019–2020
- Studio: Albuquerque Records, Chennai; Panchathan Record Inn and AM Studios, Chennai
- Genre: Filmi, folk music, dance, Indian pop, Dappankuthu
- Length: 5:04
- Label: Sony Music
- Composer: Anirudh Ravichander
- Lyricist: Arunraja Kamaraj
- Producer: Anirudh Ravichander

Music video
- "Kutti Story" on YouTube

"Kutti Story" (transl. Short story) is an Indian Tamil-language song composed by Anirudh Ravichander for the soundtrack album of the 2021 film Master. The song was sung by actor Vijay and Anirudh, in his second song he sung for Anirudh after "Selfie Pulla" for Kaththi (2014) and the lyrics were penned by Arunraja Kamaraj. The lyrical version of this single was released by Sony Music India on 14 February 2020, and the video song was released on 20 January 2021. The song was earlier titled as "Oru Kutti Kathai" in Tamil, owing to Vijay narrating short stories to fans during his speech at his audio launches.

== Production ==
The animated lyrical video of this song was released along with the single on 14 February. It featured an animated version of Vijay inside classrooms, among students. The video was designed by Coimbatore-based 3D visualisation and animation company Realworks Studios, handled by Sivaprasad Velayudham, which was responsible for the graphic rendition and pre-visualization of previous Tamil projects. It was conceptualised by Lokesh Kanagaraj's associate director, Madras Logi Vignesh. The concept of a hybrid of lyric and music video designed by Logi was appreciated by many people from the production team, including Vijay and Anirudh. The animated lyric video also featured illustrations of corruption, bribery, inflation, inequality, poverty and the COVID-19 pandemic and also the selfie that Vijay took with fans at Neyveli on 10 February 2020.

== Music video ==
The song was picturized at a juvenile school where Vijay was assigned, and seen dancing with the juvenile school children. The choreography for this song was handled by Dinesh.

== Critical response ==
Jyoti Prabhakar of The Times of India wrote "It's mostly just drums and a voice in a lyrical tango with each other. it lets Thalapathy Vijay's voice stand out, with Anirudh ably backing him. The kuthu beats are rustic, and director Arunraja Kamaraj's lyrics simple." However, the song placement was criticised by a section of audiences upon the film's release.

== Records ==
"Kutti Story" topped the trending spot within the first four days of its release, eventually became the third most viewed song worldwide within 24 hours. It became the highest viewed lyric video in the first day of its release, garnering 9 million views and a million likes. The song had garnered more than 65 million views as of July 2020, being the first lyrical video to achieve this feat. As of July 2021, the lyric video received 92 million views. The song's video version released on 20 January 2021 and gained 79 million views as of July 2021.

== Track listing ==
Its Kannada version titled "Putta Story" (written by Varadaraj Chikkaballapura) was released on 2 January 2021, and the Hindi version titled "Choti Story" (written by Raqueeb Alam) was released along with the soundtrack of Vijay The Master (the film's Hindi version) on 12 January 2021. The Telugu version of this song "Chitti Story" (written by Anantha Sriram) was released on 25 December 2020, on the occasion of Christmas. Anirudh helmed the Telugu version of the song,Super Singer 7-fame Sam Vishal recorded the Kannada version of this song, whilst Nakash Aziz sung the Hindi version of this track.

== Cover versions ==
Actress Keerthy Suresh performed a cover version of the song through violin and released the song on 22 June 2020, on the occasion of actor Vijay's 46th birthday.
