= Bjorn Surrao =

Indian music composer and actor

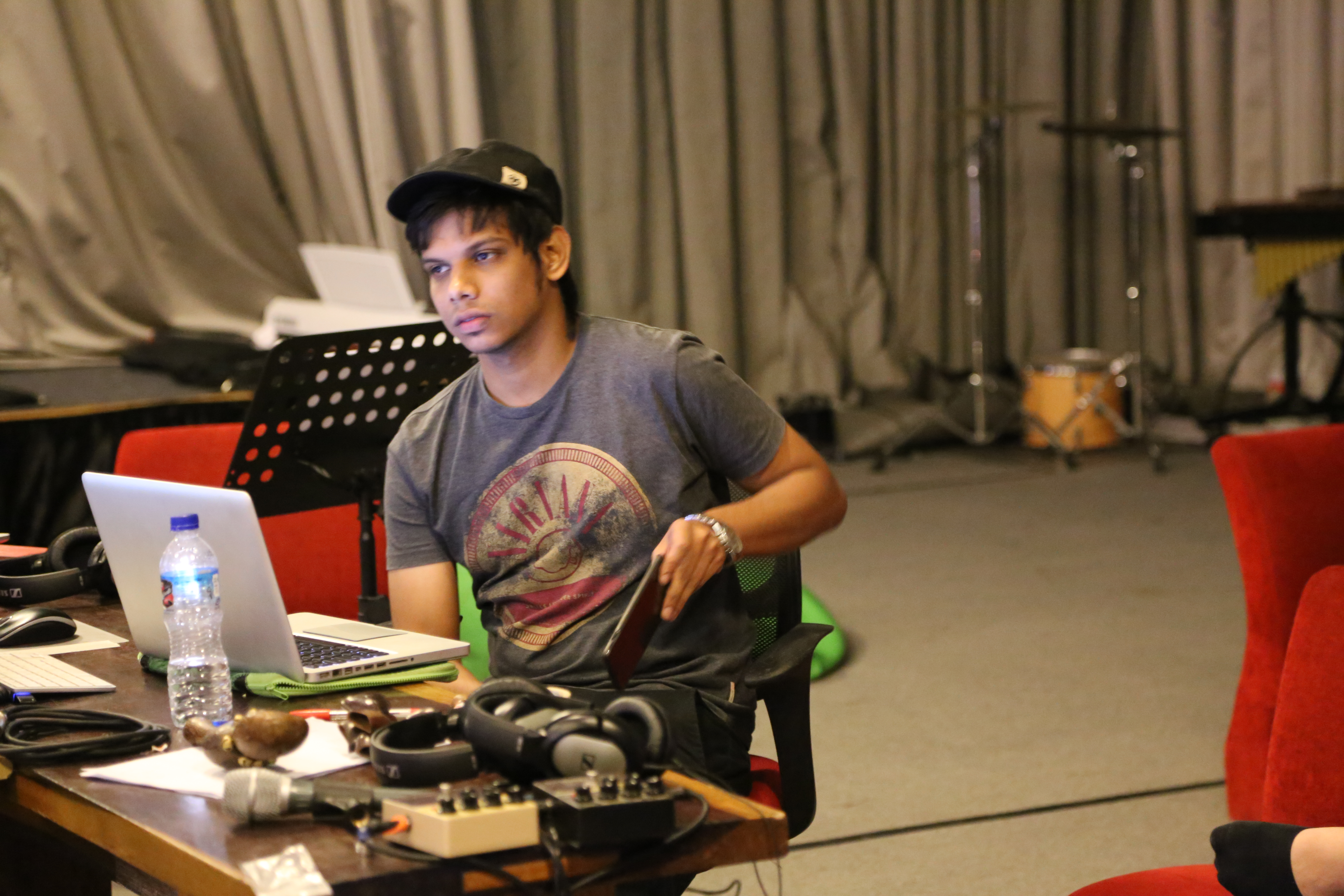
- Bjorn Surrao at work
- Born: 14 April 1992 (age 34); Chennai, Tamil Nadu, India
- Other names: Bjorn, Beon
- Occupations: Actor, Film composer, music director, Singer, songwriter, multi-instrumentalist, music producer, entrepreneur
- Years active: 2015–present

Bjorn Surrao is an Anglo-Indian singer-songwriter, performer, music producer and actor. He initially gained fame for his vocals in the song "Master the Blaster" from the Tamil film Master (2021). The track went on to become No. 1 on iTunes, Apple Music and Spotify listings with over 32 million views on YouTube. Bjorn has an independent music band called "Franks got the Funk". After "Master the Blaster", Bjorn in collaboration with Arivu and Jigarthanda Music worked on a song for Think Music titled "Yenna Sonna" Chennai Super Kings Anthem. His acting gained widespread attention after his supporting comedy role in Doctor (2021).

== Early life ==
Bjorn was born in Chennai, Tamil Nadu, India. His father is a professor in literature and his mother a social work professional. He completed high school in A. M. M. Matriculation Higher Secondary School and his bachelor's degree in commerce from Loyola College. After this he studied music production in Dubai, on returning to Chennai he completed his master's degree in business administration while simultaneously pursuing his musical career. Bjorn, a self-taught musician, started playing the piano and guitar at the age of 11, he began writing songs at the age of 15. During his college days he formed two alternative bands ‘Franks Got The Funk' and ‘Circuit‘ both being well renowned in the college circuit as well as the music industry.

== Discography ==
As composer

| Year | Film / Music Album | Language | Notes | Ref. |
|---|---|---|---|---|
| 2015 | Oru Cup Coffee | Tamil | Short Film | |
| 2015 | 5 Minutes | Tamil | Short Film | |
| 2015 | Stories from a Bottle | English | Extended play; also singer | |
| 2017 | Naalu Peruku Nalladhuna Edhuvum Thappilla | Tamil | | |
| 2017 | Kadhal Neeye | Tamil | Music album | |
| 2021 | Yenna Sonna CSK Anthem | Tamil | Song; also singer Composed with "Jigarthanda Music" | |
| 2022 | Hey Babe | Tamil | Music album | |
| 2023 | Sila Nodigalil | Tamil | One song | |
| 2025 | Leg Piece | Tamil | | |

As singer

| Year | Song | Film | Language | Notes | Ref. |
|---|---|---|---|---|---|
| 2017 | "Vaa Velaikara" | Velaikkaran | Tamil | | |
| 2021 | "Master the Blaster" | Master | Tamil | English track; Also lyricist | |
| 2022 | "La La La" | Attack: Part 1 | Hindi | English track; Also lyricist | |

== Filmography ==
As actor

- All films are in Tamil language unless otherwise noted.

| Year | Film | Role | Notes |
|---|---|---|---|
| 2021 | Doctor | Prathap's competitor | |
| 2022 | Beast | Himself | Cameo appearance in the song "Jolly O Gymkhana" |
| 2023 | Soppana Sundari | Richie | |
| 2024 | Kanguva | Francis' prisoner | Cameo appearance in the song "Yolo" |
| 2025 | Dragon | Mark | |
| 2025 | Leg Piece | | |
| 2025 | Gajaana | Bjorn | |
| 2026 | Love Insurance Kompany | Parimal | |
| 2026 | Idhayam Murali | DJ | |
| 2026 | Vishwanath & Sons | Thangavel’s henchmen | |
| 2026 | Meesaya Murukku 2 | Michael | |
| 2026 | Jailer 2 | Kohli | |
