= Master (2021 film) =

2021 Indian film by Lokesh Kanagaraj

- Theatrical release poster
- Directed by: Lokesh Kanagaraj
- Written by: Lokesh Kanagaraj; Pon Parthiban; Rathna Kumar
- Produced by: S. Xavier Britto
- Starring: Vijay; Vijay Sethupathi; Malavika Mohanan
- Cinematography: Sathyan Sooryan
- Edited by: Philomin Raj
- Music by: Anirudh Ravichander
- Production company: XB Film Creators
- Distributed by: Seven Screen Studio
- Release date: 13 January 2021
- Running time: 179 minutes
- Country: India
- Language: Tamil
- Budget: ₹135 crore
- Box office: est. ₹220–300 crore (Note: According to The Indian Express, Master grossed ₹220 crore worldwide. Box Office India stated that the film grossed ₹230 crore in its lifetime. India Today stated that the film grossed ₹250 crore, and The News Minute published that the film made ₹300 crore.)

Master is a 2021 Indian Tamil-language action drama film written and directed by Lokesh Kanagaraj and produced by S. Xavier Britto under XB Film Creators. The film stars Vijay, Vijay Sethupathi and Malavika Mohanan, with Andrea Jeremiah, Arjun Das, Shanthanu Bhagyaraj and Gouri G. Kishan in supporting roles. It is the first project of the production house, which also co-produced the film with Jagadish Palanisamy and Seven Screen Studio. The film follows an alcoholic college professor who takes a three-month teaching job at a juvenile home, and clashes with a ruthless gangster who uses the inmates as the scapegoat for his criminal activities.

Lokesh narrated the script to Vijay in May 2019, and after his acceptance, the film was launched in August 2019. Lokesh wrote the script, screenplay and dialogue with Rathna Kumar and Pon Parthiban being credited as co-writers. Principal photography commenced in October 2019 and ended in February 2020; the entire film was shot across Delhi, Mumbai, Chennai and Karnataka within 129 working days. Originally announced under the tentative title Thalapathy 64, the official title Master was announced on 31 December 2019. The music is composed by Anirudh Ravichander, while cinematography and editing are performed by Sathyan Sooryan and Philomin Raj, respectively.

Master was initially planned for a theatrical release on 9 April 2020, but was postponed due to the COVID-19 pandemic in India. The makers preferred to wait for a theatrical release, rather than release it on any streaming service. After being delayed for several months, the film was finally released in theatres on 13 January 2021, a day before Pongal. Master also became the fastest Tamil film to be available on a streaming service after its theatrical release; it premiered on Amazon Prime Video 16 days after its theatrical release on 29 January 2021.

Master received mixed-to-positive reviews from critics. It was the first Indian film to have occupied the top spot in the global box office at the time of release. Irrespective of the film's fragmented theatrical release and its early streaming release, the film grossed around ₹220–300 crore. Many trade analysts and exhibitors praised the film's team for the revival of the theatrical business in Tamil Nadu, which suffered heavy losses due to the pandemic.

== Plot ==
In 2002 in Nagercoil, a timid 17-year-old Bhavani witnesses his family's murder by his father's rivals. They force him to take the blame, and they incarcerate him in a juvenile detention facility, where the staff torture him mercilessly. As a consequence, he develops a ruthless and violent persona. Years later, Bhavani is released from the facility and owns the lorry and trade business.

By 2019, Bhavani has become a feared gangster and remains immune from punishment by coercing the inmates of the detention facility to take the blame for his crimes. Creating an enormous syndicate for himself, he grows on par with his father's former rivals and eventually kills them brutally.

In Chennai, John Durairaj (J.D) is a college lecturer beloved by his students for his student-friendly approach. He struggles with alcoholism and bitter dislike from fellow staff. Charulatha, aka Charu, a newly hired lecturer at his college, is the only one who commiserates with him. J.D. decides to hold an election at the school on a bet with the college principal and if the election fails, they will dismiss him from the college. Despite a successful initial election, displeased goons attacked the school. Following the botched election, the chairman assigns him to a juvenile detention facility for a 3-month assignment he does not recall volunteering for. J.D. reluctantly assumes his new position. The prison authorities warn him of the rampant drug abuse and violence there. However, he pays no heed to their warnings.

Sabari and Manikandan, two brothers, are supposed to surrender for one of Bhavani's murders. They slip a note to an unaware J.D., who is drunk. Bhavani kills them, and he and the inmates discover their bodies hanging from the ceiling of the detention centre classroom the next day. The police detain J.D. for the murders, and Charu, an NGO worker, admonishes him for his negligence. While in detention, J.D. discovers the brothers' note detailing the horrific activities in the detention centre. Heartbroken, J.D. clobbers Bhavani's goons sent to kill him. He calls Bhavani and promises to pay for the boys' deaths. After quitting drinking, J.D. gains control over the institution and begins to reform the inmates. However, Das, an older inmate responsible for controlling the younger children, opposes him. With the help of Undiyal, J.D. discovers that Bhavani regularly makes inmates take the blame for his heinous crimes. He records a video of younger inmates, including Undiyal, discussing Das's crimes in the facility. Bhavani's goons target Charu and retrieve the film, sparing her only because of Undiyal's timely intervention. Undiyal reveals that select inmates are tattooed with the Tamil letter 'ப' (Pa), allowing them to access free food and drugs in exchange for surrendering for Bhavani's crimes.

J.D. raids various establishments and cuts off the drug supply to the detention facility, causing frustration to Bhavani. He sneaks into Bhavani's hideout and threatens him and his men with severe consequences while unknowingly holding Bhavani at knifepoint using a ball pen. Bhavani retaliates by killing J.D.'s batchmate, Prem and ex-student, Bhargav, in two separate lorry accidents. With J.D. incapacitated by grief, Das abducts most of the inmates, intending to take them out of Tamil Nadu along with Bhavani's Benami documents. With the help of archer Vanathi, J.D. defeats Das's men and rescues the children. He confronts Das, and J.D. reveals he is the link between Bhavani and the crimes in the detention facility. Das reforms and transports J.D. and the children to Bhavani's meatpacking plant.

Bhavani's goons escort Das to a room to kill him, but he overpowers the men sent to kill him while J.D. confronts Bhavani. J.D. defeats Bhavani by damaging Bhavani's right hand with his bangle. Bhavani later urges J.D. to join him in politics, but J.D. kills him, avenging Sabari's and Manikandan's deaths. With the children safe, J.D. and Das surrender to the police. The government shuts down the detention facility and sends inmates to other detention facilities and state prisons based on age. The government sends J.D., Das, and the other adults from the facility to another prison, where they intend to reform the inmates.

== Cast ==
- Vijay as John Durairaj "JD"
- Vijay Sethupathi as Bhavani
  - Mahendran as Young Bhavani (cameo and voiced by Sethupathi)
- Malavika Mohanan as Charulatha "Charu" Prasad (Voice dubbed by Raveena Ravi).
- Andrea Jeremiah as Vanathi, J.D.'s friend and an expert in archery.
- Arjun Das as Das, an ally of Bhavani responsible for the illegal drug and alcoholic activities in the juvenile detention facility. He later reforms himself and joins J.D. in his fight against Bhavani.
  - Master LK Akshay Kumar as Young Das
- Shanthanu Bhagyaraj as Bhargav, a student who is angry at his co-student Savitha during the election, but later turns her best friend.
- Gouri G. Kishan as Savitha, a students' welfare leaders who cooperates with Bhargav. She is also shown to be one of J.D.'s favourite pupils.
- Nassar as the college's founder and JD's mentor. (Guest appearance)
- Azhagam Perumal as Anbayya Samuel, the college principal
- Ciby Bhuvana Chandran as Sri, a college student
- Kulappulli Leela as the juvenile school cook
- Ramya Subramanian as Ramya, a college professor
- Rajesh as a college staff member
- Mahanadi Shankar as Thulukanam, the jail warden
- Pravin Adithya as Adhik, one of the abusers
- Arun Alexander as Essaki, Bhavani's enemy
- Raja Rani Pandian as P. C. Arumugam
- Sai Dheena as Dheena, juvenile school warden
- Ramesh Thilak as juvenile school warden
- Chetan as a college professor
- Mathew Varghese as Mathew, a college professor
- Sudha as Savitha's mother (Deleted scene)
- Ravishankar as Savitha's father (Deleted scene)
- Ajith Koshy as Adhik's father
- Rahul Kannan as Rahul, one of the abusers
- Sunil Reddy as Education Minister
- Kalyani Natarajan as a college staff member
- Mona as a college professor
- Vishalini as Rosie Madam, a college professor
- Surekha Vani as Adhik's mother (deleted scene)
- Soundarya Bala Nandakumar as a college professor
- Lintu Rony as a college professor
- Dheena as a prisoner
- Lallu as a prisoner
- Udayaraj as a prisoner
- Poovaiyar as Undiyal, a juvenile student that helps JD
- Sriman as JD's friend
- Sanjeev as JD's friend
- Srinath as JD's friend
- Prem Kumar as Prem, JD's friend
- Nagendra Prasad as JD's friend
- Sangeetha V as Madhi, a dentist for the juvenile school
- Master Shakthi as a juvenile student
- Master Bhavaz as Sabari
- Brigida as a student
- Ravi Venkataraman as the police inspector
- Nakkalites Chella as Education Minister's PA
- Vasanthi (in the song "Vaathi Coming")

Director Lokesh Kanagaraj and co-writer Rathna Kumar made cameo appearances as prisoners during the end credits.

== Production ==
=== Development ===
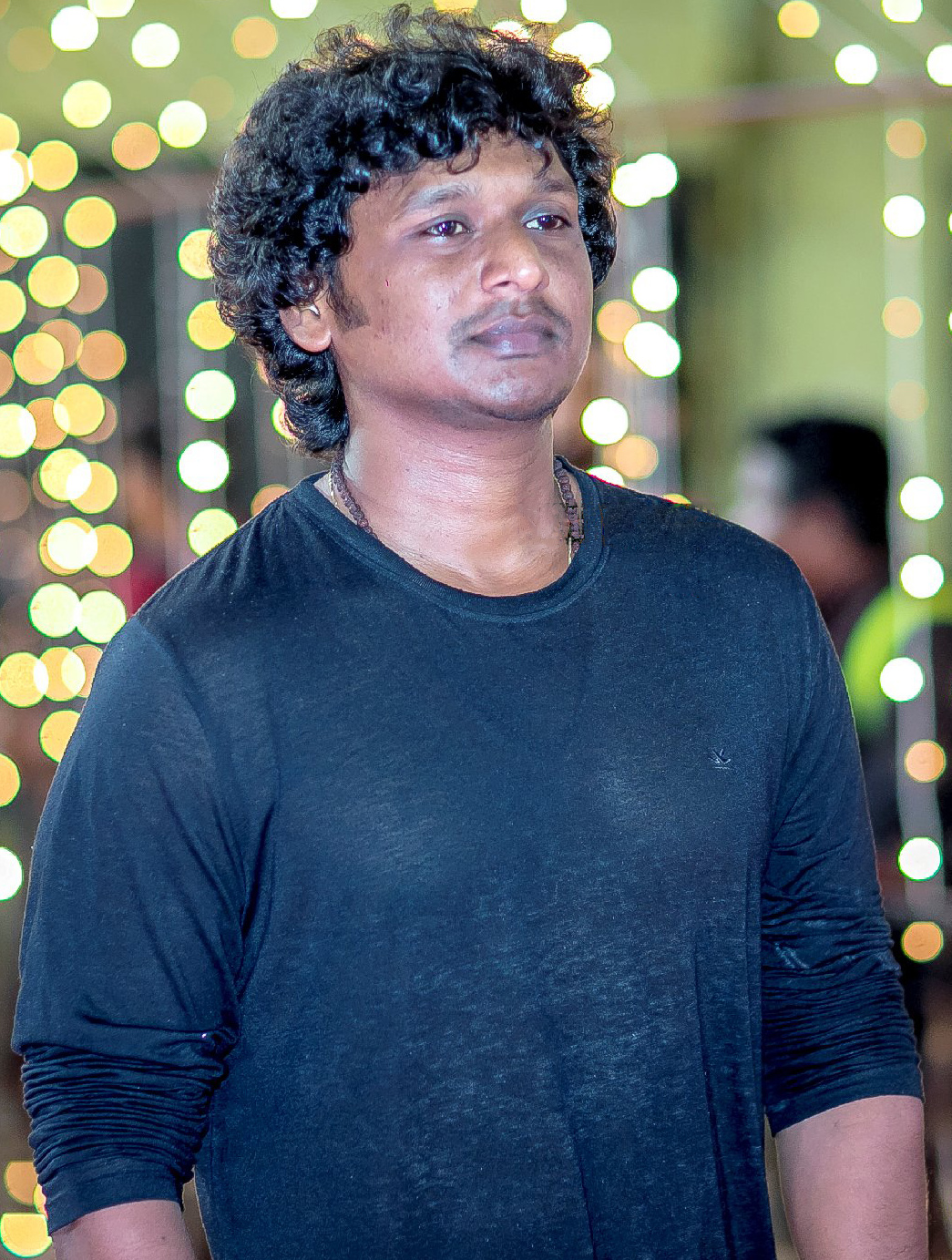
Lokesh Kanagaraj in 2020

In March 2019, sources claimed that after Bigil (2019), Vijay will be working with Mohan Raja's next film. However, in May 2019, it was also announced that he will be working with Lokesh Kanagaraj for his 64th venture, which will be produced by Xavier Britto. Britto who is a relative of Vijay, produced three films for the actor, Senthoorapandi (1993), Rasigan (1994) and Deva (1995), all of which were directed by Vijay's father S. A. Chandrasekhar. On 22 May 2019, it was reported that Vijay gave a call sheet for 120 days. An official announcement was made on 24 August 2019, by producer Britto, under his newly launched production banner XB Film Creators. Lalit Kumar of Seven Screen Studio co-produced the film, along with Vijay's manager Jagadish Palaniswamy. Along with the news, he revealed some of the crew that will work on the film, with Anirudh Ravichander being announced as the music director and Silva for stunt choreography. Sathyan Sooryan and Philomin Raj were retained as the cinematographer and editor respectively for this film, after previously collaborated on the director's Kaithi. Originally launched under the tentative title Thalapathy 64, the official title Master was announced on 31 December 2019 (New Year's Eve).

=== Casting ===
In September 2019, Vijay Sethupathi was announced to be portraying the antagonist. The following October, Malavika Mohanan was announced as the lead actress. The cast additions included Shanthanu Bhagyaraj and Antony Varghese, with the latter making his Tamil debut. Varghese later left the project, citing scheduling conflicts and was later replaced by Arjun Das, who was a part of Lokesh's previous venture, Kaithi. Andrea Jeremiah also signed to be a part of the film in October 2019, followed by Brigida Saga and Gouri G. Kishan. Ramya Subramanian also joined the film's second schedule. The film's cast additions also included, Nassar, Sanjeev, Sriman, Srinath, Prem, Nagendra Prasad, Mahendran amongst others. Raveena Ravi dubbed Malavika Mohanan's voice. Actor Kathir's father made his acting debut with this film. In January 2021, it was reported that Nani and Madhavan were approached for playing the antagonist before Sethupathi was finalised. Surekha Vani also filmed scenes, but those were not included in the final cut.

=== Filming ===
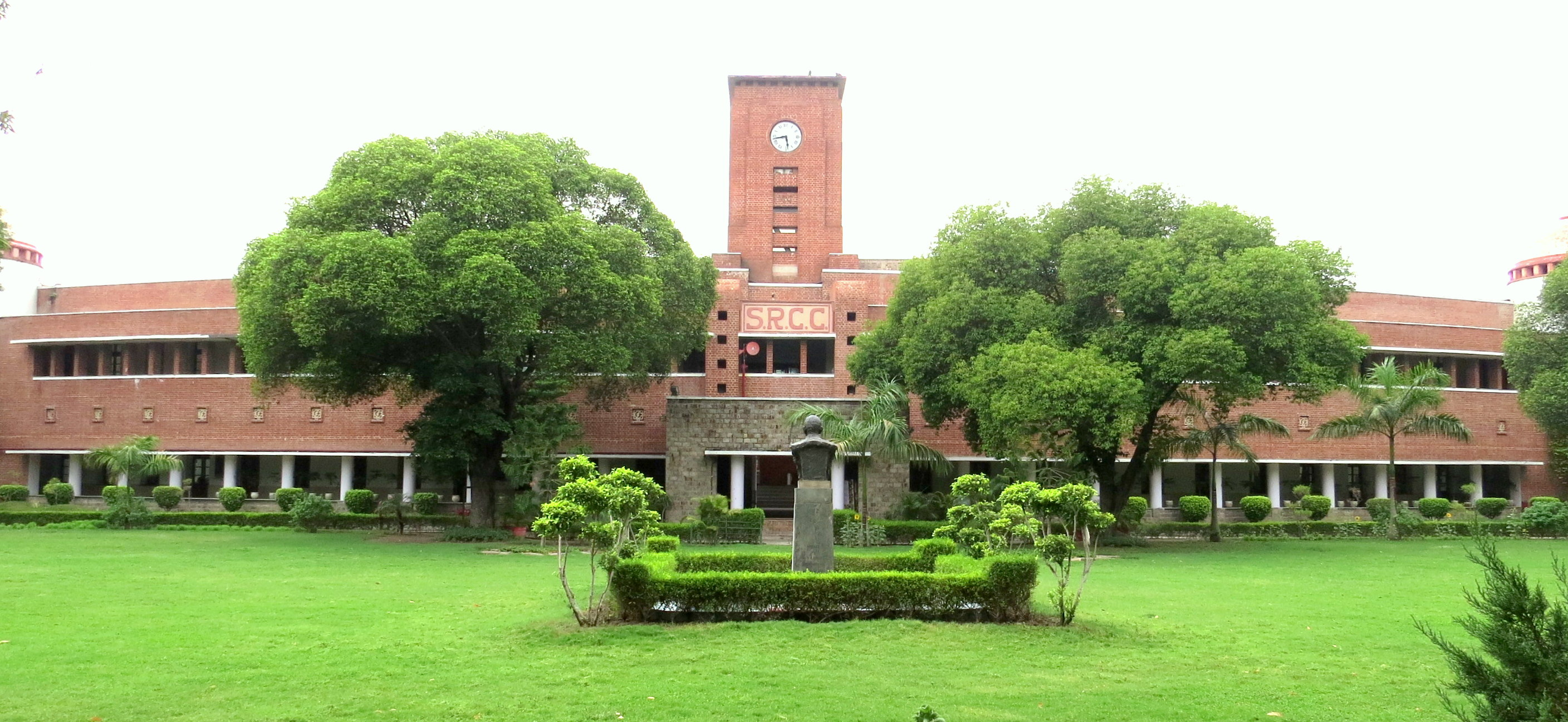
Shri Ram College of Commerce, where integral portions of the film were shot.

Principal photography began with a pooja ceremony on 3 October 2019; the film's cast and crew were present at the event. On 4 October, Rathna Kumar posted on Twitter that he was co-writing the screenplay for this project along with Lokesh. Pon Parthiban, who previously collaborated with Kanagaraj in Kaithi, was signed to co-write the screenplay with Kanagaraj and Kumar. The film's first schedule took place in Chennai for 15 days. Post the completion of the first schedule, the film's team planned for a 20-day schedule in Delhi. Vijay and the film's crew members went to Delhi for the second schedule in November 2019. Stills from the film's shooting spot at Shri Ram College of Commerce in the North Campus, where a song sequence is being filmed, which found its way to the internet, went viral. The film's shoot briefly delayed due to pollution in Delhi. After few pictures from the film's shooting spots were leaked, the team proceeded to have the images removed under the Digital Millennium Copyright Act (DMCA).

The crew went to film few important scenes, featuring Vijay and Vijay Sethupathi at Shimoga district in Karnataka after the Delhi schedule being completed. However, the makers planned to shoot few scenes in Chennai, before the schedule. Shanthanu and Sethupathi went to Shimoga in December 2019. Art director Satheesh Kumar, stated in an interview, that more than 15 sets were made on the film's shoot, with one of them being the Metro train sets, which is being used for the first time in Tamil cinema. The makers went to film fight scenes featuring Sethupathi and Vijay at the Neyveli Lignite Corporation (NLC). However the film's shoot was interrupted twice, when Vijay was summoned by the Income tax officials on 5 February, about potential tax evasion, and later on 7 February, when members of Bharatiya Janata Party, protested in front of the NLC. The film's shooting wrapped in February 2020, within 129 working days. For their roles in the film, both Vijay and Jeremiah underwent archery training. A portion of the sequence featuring Lokesh and Rathna Kumar appearing in the end credits of the film, was directed by Vijay, which was the first attempt in direction in his career.

=== Post-production ===
The film's post-production works which began in March 2020, soon after the completion of the film's shoot was halted due to the COVID-19 lockdown in India. After the Tamil Nadu government granted permission to resume post-production activities in May 2020, Master became one of the few films to resume works. The team reported that most of the film's works including dubbing were completed before the lockdown, except for the editing works which was resumed on 11 May 2020. Composer Anirudh Ravichander, took to Twitter stating that he started his works on the film's background score.

The runtime of the film's final cut consists of 181 minutes, before being sent to the officials of the Central Board of Film Certification on 14 December 2020. The officials granted U/A certificate to the film due to scenes featuring violence and bloodshed, and with a duration of 178 minutes before censoring. The team revealed it officially on 24 December 2020, with a tweet posted through social media. There were reports claiming that an uncensored version of the film will be made available in its digital release, with few shots which were not included in the theatrical cut. However LetsOTT, a digital media company website claimed that the film will not contain additional scenes but instead the abusive words will not be censored in this version. A deleted scene of the film with a duration of four minutes was released in February 2021.

== Themes and influences ==
"Vijay gave me the creative freedom to make the film I wanted to. I also have a responsibility to the star and his fans. I cannot totally experiment. So I told myself that it should be 50-50. The film's opening and its audience is entirely Vijay's. I just wanted to do my part well."

— Lokesh Kanagaraj, about the making of Master in an interview with Baradwaj Rangan of Film Companion South.

Film critic Sudhir Srinivasan explained about the references of pointing several films including 7G Rainbow Colony, Vaaranam Aayiram, Mouna Ragam, Kadhal Kottai and Premam. In the film, JD references the scenes as examples about the reason for why he became an alcoholic. However, it was referred that he was a student of Professar Selvam, a character played by Kamal Haasan in Nammavar, whom he considered as an inspiration and becomes alcoholic after his loss. Many reports claimed that the film is inspired from the South Korean film Silenced, however writer Pon Parthiban stated that the film is a real-life story, based on a person he is familiar with. Vijay's character and the introductory sequence was inspired from the film Baby Driver (2017), where the titular character Baby (Ansel Elgort), finds catharsis in music, and the character was also being modelled from the latter. His character drew inspiration from that of Clint Eastwood's role in the Dollars Trilogy, where the protagonist was not allowed to tell about his backstory.

Many critics had praised the director Kanagaraj for the portrayal of Vijay as a "flawed hero" apart from the "regular commercial star". A critic from The News Minute wrote an article about Vijay's portrayal and also the usual political references in the film, but stated that the "politics is as flawed as Vijay's character". His character John Durairaj (JD) was described as a loner, sombre, alcoholic and also a person who is willing to help, only if he is asked to do so, while Sethupathi's character Bhavani as a god-fearing man and who does not prefer drugs and alcoholism, irrespective of his evil nature. Critics opened about the negative aspects (Achilles' heel or the weakness) of the protagonist which was predominantly shown throughout the film, in contrast to the novel The Hero's Journey written by Joseph Campbell, where the negative traits of a protagonist were not shown throughout the film.

In an interview with critic Baradwaj Rangan of Film Companion South, Lokesh Kanagaraj, who is a fan of Haasan, explained the connection between the two films and also credited in the film's filmography. Srinivasan also referred to the 2015 film Thani Oruvan pointing the neo-noir characterisation of the actors Vijay and Sethupathi stating "the film is constantly intercutting between developments in their respective lives, as their trajectories hurtle towards each other—even if not as methodically". Lokesh confessed that he wanted to do Master entirely according to his style, for which Vijay agreed, but he did not do so due to Vijay's stardom and value.

== Music ==
The film's soundtrack album and background music is composed by Anirudh Ravichander, with lyrics written by Arunraja Kamaraj, Gana Balachandar, Arivu, Vignesh Shivan, Vishnu Edavan and Bjorn Surrao. The album features eight tracks with three singles — "Kutti Story", "Vaathi Coming" and "Vaathi Raid" — were released before the launch. The audio was released at a launch event held on 15 March 2020, at the Leela palace hotel in Chennai and was aired live on Sun TV. Despite the album being released in its entirety, two songs "Vaathi Kabaddi" and "Master The Blaster" were unveiled as a part of the extended soundtrack album. As of April 2021, the album crossed more than 5 billion streams in all music streaming platforms.

== Release ==
=== Theatrical ===
Master was released on 13 January 2021, a day before Pongal, in over 1000 theatres in Tamil Nadu. The film was originally scheduled for a theatrical release on 9 April 2020, but as the Tamil Nadu government led by Chief Minister Edappadi K. Palaniswami announced for a closure of theatres so as to curb COVID-19 pandemic spread, the film was postponed indefinitely. The film's director, producer and other technical crew members assured the plans of theatrical release, as the film is made for a "big-screen experience". The film was rumoured to be released on Diwali (14 November 2020), after the Tamil Nadu government permitted reopening of theatres, four days before the festival, on 10 November, which did not happen. It is for the first time, Vijay did not have a release in a calendar year. On 28 November 2020, the producers released a press statement, refuting rumours of releasing the film on any streaming service, and also reiterating plans for a theatrical release, as this decision was crucial for the revival of the film industry, which had suffered unprecedented losses due to the pandemic.

In December 2020, the makers officially announced that the film will be released on 13 January 2021. Additionally, dubbed versions of the film would also release simultaneously in Telugu, Kannada and Malayalam. However, the Malayalam version do not released theatrically. The Telugu version of Master was released across 600 theatres in Andhra Pradesh and Telangana. In Kerala the film opened in 200 theatres, was considered to be the first release in Kerala, as theatres reopened on that date. It is mostly due to the theatre owners strike against the Kerala government demanding relief package and tax exemption, delayed the reopening of theatres, although the central government permitted to resume the operation of theatres and multiplexes in mid-October 2020. The advance bookings of the film started from 7 January in limited theatres across Tamil Nadu, and generated record number of ticket sales for the opening weekend.

Due to the demand of the film's dubbed version in North India, the filmmakers officially announced a release of its Hindi version titled as Vijay The Master, which was scheduled for a release on 14 January 2021, across North Indian theatres. The film received an additional 500 screens in Central India, Rajasthan, Delhi, Uttar Pradesh, and Punjab, for the film's Tamil, Telugu and Hindi versions, irrespective of being released in 2000 screens. The film was not released in the United Kingdom and Canada due to COVID-19 restrictions.

=== Distribution ===
The film's pre-release business, which includes theatrical, overseas, satellite, digital, music and dubbing rights were sold for ₹200 crore prior to the COVID-19 pandemic. Master's worldwide distribution rights were acquired by S. S. Lalit Kumar of Seven Screen Studio, who sold the film to its area-wise sub-distributors: Shri Sai Combines (Tirunelveli and Kanyakumari), Sushma Cine Arts (Madurai), Plus Max Films (Tiruchirappalli and Thanjavur), Sri Raj Films (Salem), Kanthasamy Arts Films Distributors (Coimbatore), 5 Star Senthil (North and South Arcot), Dhanam Pictures (Chengalpattu), Sri Karpaga Vinayaga Film Circuits (Chennai). Prithviraj Sukumaran bought the distribution rights of the film in Kerala, under his Prithviraj Productions banner. Dheeraj Enterprises and Mahesh Koneru's East Coast Productions acquired the distribution rights for Karnataka and Andhra Pradesh-Telangana regions respectively while United India Exporters and Malik Streams bought the overseas rights. The film's Hindi and North India release rights were sold to B4U Motion Pictures. Lotus Five Star bought the distribution rights in Malaysia and Singapore.

=== Marketing ===
The teaser trailer of the film released on Diwali, 14 November 2020, The teaser of this film garnered more than 50 million views, and 2.5 million likes upon release, becoming the most-viewed and most-liked South Indian film teaser, until its record was beaten by the teaser of K.G.F: Chapter 2 (2021), which surpassed more than 78 million views, within 4.2 million likes within 24 hours of its release. The teaser for the Telugu version was released on 17 December 2020, and teaser for the Hindi version titled Vijay The Master, was released on 7 January 2021.

To promote the film, a new Twitter emoji was launched on the New Year's Day, 1 January 2021. On late December 2020, the makers collaborated with Silaii Sculptures, as their official merchandise partner, launching a new sculpture based on Vijay's look from the film. Later, Fully Filmy unveiled the official merchandise of Master in January 2021. On 8 January 2021, the makers hosted a pre-release event in Hyderabad, to promote the film's Telugu version.

=== Home media ===
The film's post-theatrical streaming rights were acquired by Amazon Prime Video for ₹51.5 crores, and it began streaming there from 29 January 2021, 16 days after the theatrical release. The streaming and satellite rights of the Hindi-dubbed version were acquired by Zee Network. Vijay The Master, began streaming from 15 March 2021 on ZEE5.

== Controversies ==
Master was in the subjected for several controversies, the first being the raid by Income Tax Department at Vijay's residence on 5 February 2020. Vijay was inquired about potential tax evasion, when he was busy shooting for the film in Neyveli, regarding his investment in immovable properties which he inherited from the production studio AGS Entertainment, the company which had previously produced Bigil (2019). Later, the I-T department said that nothing significant was found during the raid and Vijay has paid all taxes. Two days later, on 7 February 2020, members of the Bharatiya Janata Party (BJP) protested in front of the Neyveli Lignite Corporation (NLC) where its shooting was going on. The BJP members protested against the NLC administration for granting permission for the shoot. Although the film crew had obtained permission, the members of the BJP claimed that it is a highly secured area and it's not a place for a film shooting; they also threatened to continue their protests if the shooting did not stop.

After its theatrical release postponed to 9 April 2020, due to the COVID-19 pandemic lockdown in India, the film was later rescheduled to 13 January 2021, following a nine-month long delay, since the makers assured the film is made for "big-screen experience". The makers were given permission to release the film with 100% seating capacity in theatres with forthcoming other Tamil films by the Government of Tamil Nadu after Vijay personally requested chief minister Edappadi K. Palaniswami, despite the increase in COVID-19 cases in India, especially Tamil Nadu. The Central Government of India issued a warrant against the Tamil Nadu government's decision to approve the release of the films with 100% seating capacity. saying that it is clearly in violation of the guidelines of the Minister of Home Affairs which only allows 50% seat occupancy in theatres. Many doctors too protested against this, and soon after, Central Government notice was passed and it was revoked back to 50% seating capacity in Tamil Nadu theatres.

A day prior to the release on 12 January 2021, some of the film scenes were reportedly leaked by few anonymous people in social media which triggered controversy in the film fraternity. Lokesh Kanagaraj and Malavika Mohanan openly urged the audience not to share the film leaked scenes with others and requested them to watch the film in theatres maintaining relevant safety precautions. Twitter later assisted the production team of the film to find who leaked the film scenes in the internet and which was revealed that a person who worked for a digital company for which the film copy was sold for distribution rights abroad had allegedly stolen the copy of the film and leaked them. The film was scheduled to begin streaming on Amazon Prime Video from 29 January 2021 within 16 days after its theatrical run, which is a first-of-a-kind for an Indian film. This led to disappointing response from theatre owners who feared threats from piracy sites. Despite requests, the team proceeded with the streaming premiere, and later theatre owners announced that no film should begin streaming within less than 30 days of its theatrical release.

== Reception ==
=== Box office ===
In its opening day, the film collected ₹25 crore in the Tamil Nadu box office, with ₹1.21 crore from Chennai theatres. Producer Xavier Britto officially confirmed the news of its first day collection, through the production company's Twitter account. The film earned ₹4.30 crore from Karnataka, ₹9.40 crore from Andhra Pradesh-Telangana region, ₹2.10 crore from Kerala and ₹70 lakhs from rest of the parts in India, totalling up to ₹40.40 crore in India. In its second day of release, the film earned ₹21.20 crore at the Indian box office, thus crossing the ₹50 crore mark, and the film also collected ₹14.20 crore in Tamil Nadu, there by crossing the 40-crore mark. The film earned ₹110 crore in the worldwide box office, crossing the 100-crore mark in three days, as well as the 50-crore mark in the Tamil Nadu box office collections. In its final run, the film crossed ₹145 crore in the state, becoming the highest-grossing film of 2021 in that state, until it was surpassed by Annaatthe, which crossed ₹150 crore.

At the closing of its first week box office collections, the film earned ₹140 crore at the worldwide box office within nine days of its release. Further, the film collected ₹100 crore in the Tamil Nadu box office, thus becoming the actor's fourth consecutive film to do so after Mersal, Sarkar and Bigil. The film was a profitable venture in Andhra Pradesh and Telangana, collecting ₹9.20 crore share in first three days. The Hindi dubbed version Vijay The Master collected ₹9 crore. Master also crossed the 10-crore mark at the Chennai city box office, and also surpassed the lifetime collection of Theri, at the city box office grossing ₹11.56 crore within 33 days. The film also collected a share of ₹80 crore in Tamil Nadu, surpassing Baahubali 2: The Conclusion which earlier collected ₹78 crore.

Master was the highest-grossing film in United Arab Emirates, collecting $1.4 million within two days, surpassing Wonder Woman 1984 and Tenet. Since its release according to Deadline Hollywood, it became the biggest post-pandemic worldwide release as well as the highest-grossing film in international markets and also topped the global box office rankings at the time of release. It was the first Indian film to have occupied No 1 in the global box office at the time of release. The film earned ₹4.60 crore from Australia, ₹0.90 crore from New Zealand, ₹8.00 crore from Singapore, ₹3.30 crore from United States, ₹19.00 crore from UAE and Middle East and in the rest of the world it earned ₹8.00 crore.

The Indian Express stated that the film grossed ₹220 crore worldwide. According to Box Office India, the film grossed ₹230 crore worldwide in its lifetime and remained the highest-grossing film in India post the pandemic, until it was surpassed by Sooryavanshi (2021). India Today stated that the film grossed ₹250 crore. The News Minute published that the film grossed ₹300 crore worldwide. However, trade analysts said that the collections of the film could not be compared to Vijay's Bigil or any other previous films due to the pandemic situation.

==== Box office reporting dispute ====
In 2023 the film's box office performance became part of a broader dispute between the Tamil Nadu Theatre Owners Association and the producers, regarding the accuracy of reported collection figures. Tiruppur Subramaniam, president of the association, questioned the authenticity of the reported box office figures of Master. He argued that the film's reported opening collections were implausible given that theatres were operating at 50% occupancy due to COVID-19 restrictions at the time of release.

He further alleged that the reported figures could not have been achieved under such restrictions and raised concerns over ticket pricing practices, claiming that ticket rates were increased beyond government-prescribed limits in certain instances.

These remarks were made in the context of a larger dispute involving the film Leo, where Subramaniam alleged that box office figures of both films were inflated.

=== Critical response ===
Master received mixed to positive reviews from critics. On the review aggregator website Rotten Tomatoes, 90% of 23 critics' reviews are positive, with an average rating of 7.4/10.

M Suganth of The Times of India gave 3.5 out of 5 stars and wrote "The charismatic performances of Vijay and Vijay Sethupathi that keeps us rooting." LM Kaushik of Sify gave 3.5 out of 5 stars and wrote "Master is a different Vijay film as well as a different Lokesh film. Thalapathy just keeps growing from strength to strength while Lokesh leaves his mark in the ‘mass hero’ genre too. Despite its pace issues and the length, ‘JD’ Vijay and ‘Bhavani’ Vijay make it worthwhile." S. Srivatsan of The Hindu wrote that although the film is "a bit drag and flab," the film breaks several tropes associated with the "Vijay formula." Ranjani Krishnakumar of Firstpost gave 2.5 out of 5 stars and wrote "Master is unfortunately the kind of film that concerns itself with too many things but can hardly focus on any of it beyond adorning the hero."

Saibal Chatterjee of NDTV criticised the film's length, but wrote "Master is overlong all right, but Vijay and Vijay Sethupathi make a winning combination. Buoyed by a fantastic score by Anirudh Ravichander, here is a film that, for all its flaws, is keenly aware of the star power at its disposal and seldom punches below its weight." Janani. K of India Today described Lokesh's script as "boring" and criticised the nearly three-hour runtime, but called Vijay's performance as a flawed character an improvement over his usual roles as "a righteous man belting out socially-conscious messages" and also praised the soundtrack. Manoj Kumar. R of The Indian Express gave 2.5 out of 5 stars and wrote "Master is neither completely a Vijay film nor entirely a Lokesh Kanagaraj film. Lokesh's self-imposed limitations and obligation to be in fan-service undermine the film's impact. He has used so many good talents as just fillers and wasted resources on ideas that don't take the story forward. And, those are not the qualities of Lokesh who made Maanagaram and Kaithi."

Karthik Keramalu of The Quint gave 2 out of 5 stars and opined that "Master wouldn't have become a drastically different movie, if the film lack a few illogical elements. Maybe, if the entire film had been about Bhavani alone, it would have been fun!" Baradwaj Rangan of Film Companion South wrote "There's one part of us waiting to see 'A Lokesh Kanagaraj Film'. There's another part of us waiting for 'A Vijay Entertainer'. The film is a not-bad balance." Anna Smith of Deadline Hollywood wrote "Master may deliver its lessons with a heavy hand, but it's got the charisma to see you through." Ananda Vikatan rated the film 43 out of 100.

== Accolades ==
| Date of ceremony | Award | Category | Recipient(s) and nominee(s) | Result | Ref. |
|---|---|---|---|---|---|
| 9 October 2022 | Filmfare Awards South | Best Music Director – Tamil | Anirudh Ravichander | Nominated | |
| 9 October 2022 | Filmfare Awards South | Best Male Playback Singer – Tamil | Arivu – Vaathi Raid | Nominated | |
| 9 October 2022 | Filmfare Awards South | Best Male Playback Singer – Tamil | Vijay – Kutti Story | Nominated | |
| 9 October 2022 | Filmfare Awards South | Best Choreography | Dinesh – Vaathi Coming | Won | |
| 28 December 2022 | Ananda Vikatan Cinema Awards | Best Music Director | Anirudh Ravichander | Won | |
| 28 December 2022 | Ananda Vikatan Cinema Awards | Best Stunt Director | Stunt Silva | Won | |
| 28 December 2022 | Ananda Vikatan Cinema Awards | Best Choreographer | Dinesh – Vaathi Coming | Won | |
| 10–11 September 2022 | South Indian International Movie Awards | Best Director | Lokesh Kanagaraj | Won | |
| 10–11 September 2022 | South Indian International Movie Awards | Best Cinematographer | Sathyan Sooryan | Nominated | |
| 10–11 September 2022 | South Indian International Movie Awards | Best Actor | Vijay | Nominated | |
| 10–11 September 2022 | South Indian International Movie Awards | Best Actor in a Supporting Role | Mahendran | Nominated | |
| 10–11 September 2022 | South Indian International Movie Awards | Best Actor in a Negative Role | Vijay Sethupathi | Nominated | |
| 10–11 September 2022 | South Indian International Movie Awards | Best Debut Actress | Malavika Mohanan | Nominated | |
| 10–11 September 2022 | South Indian International Movie Awards | Best Music Director | Anirudh Ravichander | Nominated | |
| 12 March 2022 | Edison Awards | Mass Hero of the Year | Vijay | | |
| 12 March 2022 | Edison Awards | Favourite Actress | Malavika Mohanan | Nominated | |
| 12 March 2022 | Edison Awards | Best Film | Master | Won | |
| 12 March 2022 | Edison Awards | Best Director | Lokesh Kanagaraj | Nominated | |
| 12 March 2022 | Edison Awards | Best Screenplay | Lokesh Kanagaraj | Nominated | |
| 12 March 2022 | Edison Awards | Best Cinematographer | Sathyan Sooryan | Nominated | |
| 12 March 2022 | Edison Awards | Best Editor | Philomin Raj | Nominated | |
| 12 March 2022 | Edison Awards | Best Music Director | Anirudh Ravichander | Nominated | |
| 12 March 2022 | Edison Awards | Best BGM Score | Anirudh Ravichander | Nominated | |
| 12 March 2022 | Edison Awards | Best Singer Male | Vijay – Kutti Story | Nominated | |
| 12 March 2022 | Edison Awards | Best Lyrics | Arunraja Kamaraj – Kutti Story | Nominated | |
| 12 March 2022 | Edison Awards | Best Child Role | Poovaiyar | Nominated | |

== Impact ==
Although its release was pushed to January 2021, Master was listed in the Most Anticipated Tamil Films of 2020, in the articles listed by Firstpost and The Indian Express. The film topped the list of most tweeted hashtags about movies, in a survey report by Twitter India. The #MasterSelfie where Vijay took a selfie along with his fans in a shooting spot from Neyveli, became the most retweeted tweet in India of 2020. Many prominent industry analysts supported Master, as it was the first-mainstream Indian film to be released post-the COVID-19 lockdown. Prior to the release, the film notched 80% higher ticket sales in BookMyShow, beating Vijay's previous film Bigil (2019).

Dhanush tweeted about the theatrical release of Master, in which he asked fans to follow the safety precautions, while watching the film. Silambarasan also requested the same during the audio launch of his film Eeswaran (2021), for fans to watch films in theatres, following the necessary guidelines for safety. Director Mysskin and actress Radhika, also praised the actor's decision to release the film in theatres, as well as many producers and distributors. Malayalam actors Vineeth Sreenivasan, Kalyani Priyadarshan and Pranav Mohanlal, who worked in Hridayam, praised the film. Standup comedian-cum-actor Karthik Kumar too praised the film and Vijay, for allowing Vijay Sethupathi's performance getting well-received through the film. At the pre-release event of Uppena, where Vijay Sethupathi played a key role in the film, Chiranjeevi praised the actor's performance in that launch event.

Indian cricketer Ravichandran Ashwin praised the film and also the performances of Vijay and Vijay Sethupathi. At the test match between India and England held in Chennai, Ashwin grooved to the song "Vaathi Coming" when it is played during the test match. The video went viral across the release and Ashwin, Kuldeep Yadav and Hardik Pandya, did the shoulder drop step in a cover video posted on 19 February 2021. The song "Vaathi Coming" reached phenomenal response and many Indian celebrities such as Shilpa Shetty, Nazriya Nazim, Varalaxmi Sarathkumar and Genelia D'Souza recreated the signature step which went viral through social media. Cricketer Harbhajan Singh recreated the step during the shooting of Friendship, his acting debut, as did another cricketer David Warner. Cricketer Suresh Raina danced to the song at the Behindwoods Gold Medals awards held on 7 March 2021, where he was awarded The Global Icon of Inspiration: Sports, by Lokesh.

After Master's success, many North Indian trade exhibitors suggested Bollywood industry, to release their films after the pandemic. Many sources reported that Master was noted for the revival of theatrical business, irrespective of the box-office collections. An article based on the film's theatrical release and anticipation surrounded towards the film was published by Cricinfo, the online news portal of ESPN, for cricket-related sources, before the first test match between India and England was held in Chennai, without spectators. Theatre owners in Tamil Nadu claimed that, despite the revival of theatrical business, none of the films which released after Master, received a similar success as the latter due to non-gripping content and lack of promotional activities. The film topped IMDb's list of "most popular Indian films and web series" during June 2021. The Indian Express named Master as one of the "Best Tamil Films" released during the first half of 2021.

== Potential remake ==
A day after the film's release, a Hindi remake was announced after some of the North Indian distributors were impressed with the film's output. The film's Hindi remake rights were bought by Endemol Shine India and Murad Khetani. The remake will be produced by Endemol Shine in association with Cine1 Studios and Seven Screen Studio which also co-produced and distributed the original film.
