= Beast (soundtrack) =

2022 soundtrack album by Anirudh Ravichander

- Soundtrack album cover

Soundtrack album by Anirudh Ravichander
- Released: 9 April 2022
- Recorded: 2021–2022
- Studios: Albuquerque Records, Chennai; Panchathan Record Inn and AM Studios, Chennai; Krimson Avenue Studios, Chennai; Strings 7 Studio, Chennai; My Studio, Kochi; YRF Studios, Mumbai; Abbey Road Studios, London
- Genre: Feature film soundtrack
- Length: 11:47
- Language: Tamil
- Label: Sun Pictures
- Producer: Anirudh Ravichander

Anirudh Ravichander chronology
Naai Sekar (2022)	Beast (2022)	Kaathuvaakula Rendu Kaadhal (2022)

Singles from Beast
- 1. "Arabic Kuthu" Released: 14 February 2022; 2. "Jolly O Gymkhana" Released: 19 March 2022; 3. "Beast Mode" Released: 8 April 2022

Beast is the soundtrack composed by Anirudh Ravichander for the 2022 Tamil-language film of the same name directed by Nelson; starring Vijay and Pooja Hegde, the film is produced by Kalanithi Maran under the studio Sun Pictures. The film, under the tentative title Thalapathy 65 (referring to the actor's 65th film project), initially had S. Thaman reported to score for the film. In a turn of events, the makers roped in Anirudh for the production of songs and film score. This film eventually marked Anirudh's third collaboration with Vijay after Kaththi (2014) and Master (2021), and with Nelson after Kolamaavu Kokila (2018) and Doctor (2021).

The album was initially reported to have 5 songs, along with theme tracks, however, only four songs were finalized to feature in the film after extensive rewrites of the story during the COVID-19 lockdown. The soundtrack will include several instrumental tracks being bundled with the film songs before its release. As of March 2022, two songs were released as singles from the album. The first single from the album, titled "Arabic Kuthu" released on 14 February 2022, coinciding with Valentine's Day. The song set the record for the most-viewed and liked South Indian song within 24 hours. The second single, "Jolly O Gymkhana" was released on 19 March 2022. The third single, "Beast Mode" was released on 8 April 2022.

== Background ==
When Thalapathy 65 was first announced by Sun Pictures, Thaman S officially revealed his interest in composing for the film, after his revelation in an interview given to a Telugu news channel. Vijay too appreciated his recent Telugu musicals, including Ala Vaikunthapurramuloo (2020), where he was lauded for the songs and film score. But, the director, A. R. Murugadoss who was initially roped in for the project, was ousted by Sun Pictures in October 2020, as the director refused to cut down his remuneration, thereby leading to Thaman's exit. In November 2020, Anirudh Ravichander who worked in the Vijay-starrer Master, insisted Nelson to direct the film, as Anirudh had worked with Nelson in Kolamaavu Kokila (2018) and Doctor (2021). With Sun Pictures announcing the project officially on 10 December 2020 with Nelson as the director, Anirudh too confirmed his inclusion in the project, continuing his association with the director and also working with Vijay for the third time.

== Production ==
The album for Beast was initially reported to have five songs and six theme tracks, but the number of songs were being reduced to four, due to the changes in the storyline, and the rest of the tracks will be instrumentals used in the film's background score. Three of the tracks were picturised on Vijay and Pooja Hegde, including a romantic single. Three instrumental themes were based upon the actor and the lead antagonists of the film. Media reports had claimed that a track was composed in the Arabic music genre (later deciphered as "Arabic Kuthu"), which had vocals by Anirudh himself and features lyrics in Tamil and Arabic languages; the track, written by Sivakarthikeyan, is a fusion of Arabic music and Kuthu (a type of Tamil folk music) as the name of the track.

For the music sessions, Anirudh saw the shooting of the film in Chennai in mid-July 2021; he said that he could easily work on the compositions, instead of approaching the actor and director for narrating a particular sequence, so that he could get an idea of how the song for that scene could be materialised. As a humble gesture to lyricist Na. Muthukumar, Sivakarthikeyan planned to donate his salary of ₹1 million (US$10,000) to the late-lyricist's family, which he occasionally did, since his maiden stint as a songwriter in "Kalyana Vayasu" from Kolamaavu Kokila (2018), composed by Anirudh.

Vijay was also reported to sing one of the tracks in the album (later known as "Jolly O Gymkhana"), his subsequent third collaboration with Anirudh as a singer, after "Selfie Pulla" from Kaththi (2014) and "Kutti Story" from Master (2021). For the aforementioned track, the tune was composed within 30 minutes and Vijay recorded the vocals for the song in the morning, before the song shoot. According to lyricist Ku. Karthik, the song's message is that one should overcome the negative situations in life and live to the fullest. The title of the song is a reference to the song "Jalilo Jimkana" from Amara Deepam (1956). Anirudh had completed working on all the tracks as by early-November 2021.

== Marketing ==
The audio rights of the film will be retained by the production company itself; initially Sony Music India planned to acquire the rights for the album which did not happen, citing Sun Pictures' decision on not tying-up with music labels. The music album of Beast, along with Sun Pictures' upcoming film productions, will be released on the company's newly registered home label. All the lyrical and video songs from the album will be released in the official YouTube channel of Sun TV.

In a Facebook chat session, Anirudh Ravichander said that all the updates regarding the film will arrive only after the completion of shooting. The single track was initially rumoured to be released on the Anirudh's birthday (16 October 2021) and later scheduled to be launched on Diwali (4 November 2021), which however did not happen. Sun Pictures' commitments to the release of Rajinikanth-starrer Annaatthe, and also the death of Puneeth Rajkumar insisted the makers not to release any update regarding the film on Diwali, were cited as the reasons for the delay, which was posted on Ananda Vikatan's exclusive article about the film. The single was earlier planned to be released on New Year's Eve (31 December), and later to Pongal (14 January 2022), but could not be launched on that date.

In December 2021, Vijay, Nelson, Anirudh and Sivakarthikeyan shot for the promotional video for the film's first single. On 7 February 2022, Sun Pictures released the promotional skit for the first single track eventually titled as "Arabic Kuthu". The six-minute promo featured Nelson, Anirudh and Sivakarthikeyan with Vijay, in a voice-over (conversation through phone) comically documenting the song's making. The track released on the occasion of Valentine's Day (14 February 2022), after Anirudh occasionally released singles on that date. The track is sung by Anirudh and Jonita Gandhi, whom previously had collaborated in the track "Chellamma" for Doctor (2021). The film's two theme music, "Beast Announcement Theme" and "Pooja Hegde Announcement Theme" were released on 23 February 2022. The second single "Jolly O Gymkhana", sung by Vijay with lyrics written by Ku. Karthik, released on 19 March 2022. The third single, titled "Beast Mode", written by Vivek and sung by Anirudh, was released on 8 April 2022.

== Release ==
In mid-March 2022, it was reported that the film's audio launch is planned to take place on 20 March 2022, with either Sri Sai Ram Engineering College or Jawaharlal Nehru Stadium, being considered as the venue. However, a report from Ananda Vikatan confirmed that the film will not have an audio launch, with the delay in post-production works and the COVID-19 pandemic restrictions being cited as the reasons. The album would be released directly online and various music platforms.

== Track listing ==
Tamil Tracklist
No.	Title	Lyrics	Singer(s)	Length
1.	"Arabic Kuthu"	Sivakarthikeyan	Anirudh Ravichander, Jonita Gandhi	4:40
2.	"Jolly O Gymkhana"	Ku. Karthik	Vijay	3:28
3.	"Beast Mode"	Vivek	Anirudh Ravichander	3:40
Total length:				11:48

Extended Soundtrack
No.	Title	Lyrics	Singer(s)	Length
1.	"Beast Announcement Theme"	Anirudh Ravichander	Anirudh Ravichander	1:02
2.	"Pooja Hegde Announcement Theme"	Anirudh Ravichander	Anirudh Ravichander	0:56
3.	"Halamithi Habibo (LoFi Version)"	Sivakarthikeyan	Anirudh Ravichander, Jonita Gandhi, KS Abhishek
Total length:				1:58

Hindi Tracklist
No.	Title	Lyrics	Singer(s)	Length
1.	"Halamithi Habibo"	Raqueeb Alam	Anirudh Ravichander, Jonita Gandhi	4:40
2.	"Jolly O Gymkhana"	Raqueeb Alam	Nakash Aziz	3:28
3.	"Beast Mode"	Raqueeb Alam	Anirudh Ravichander, Sreerama Chandra	3:40
Total length:				11:48

Telugu Tracklist
No.	Title	Lyrics	Singer(s)	Length
1.	"Halamithi Habibo"	Sri Sai Kiran	Anirudh Ravichander, Jonita Gandhi	4:40
2.	"Jolly O Gymkhana"	Chandrabose	Nakash Aziz	3:28
3.	"Beast Mode"	Chandrabose	Anirudh Ravichander, Sreerama Chandra	3:40
Total length:				11:48

Malayalam Tracklist
No.	Title	Lyrics	Singer(s)	Length
1.	"Halamithi Habibo"	Deepak Ram	Dinker Kalvala, Jonita Gandhi	4:40
2.	"Jolly O Gymkhana"	Deepak Ram	Srikrishna Vishnubhotla	3:28
3.	"Beast Mode"	Deepak Ram		3:40
Total length:				11:48

Kannada Tracklist
No.	Title	Lyrics	Singer(s)	Length
1.	"Halamithi Habibo"	Varadaraj Chikkaballapura	Dinker Kalvala, Jonita Gandhi	4:40
2.	"Jolly O Gymkhana"	Varadaraj Chikkaballapura	Nakash Aziz	3:28
3.	"Beast Mode"	Varadaraj Chikkaballapura		3:40
Total length:				11:48

== Background score ==
Beast

Film score by Anirudh Ravichander
- Released: 20 June 2022
- Recorded: 2021–2022
- Studios: Albuquerque Records, Chennai; Knack Studios, Chennai
- Genre: Film score
- Length: 20:04
- Language: Tamil
- Label: Sun TV
- Producer: Anirudh Ravichander

Anirudh Ravichander chronology
Naai Sekar (2022)	Beast (2022)	Kaathuvaakula Rendu Kaadhal (2022)
External audio
- Film Score on YouTube

No.	Title	Length
1.	"The Child"	0:53
2.	"The Plan is On"	0:57
3.	"Big Bad Beast"	1:32
4.	"Intro Fight"	1:55
5.	"Missile Launch"	1:52
6.	"Can You Dance"	0:54
7.	"Dominic & Soldiers"	1:04
8.	"Hijacked"	1:40
9.	"Rise of Veera"	1:58
10.	"Veeraraghavan"	1:50
11.	"Reverse Hijack"	2:14
12.	"Yen Pecha Naane Kekkamaaten"	1:05
13.	"Disguise"	2:23
14.	"The Raw Agent"	1:39
15.	"Cucumba"	0:44
Total length:		22:37

== Reception ==
Critic based at The Indian Express, writing for the track "Arabic Kuthu" stated Sivakarthikeyan's lyrics as the highlights, called the "gibberish" lyrics as the fun part of the track and stated "Composer Anirudh wants to make a point that as long as the music is enjoyable, people don't sweat over incomprehensible lyrics". Soundarya Athimuthu of The Quint stated that "the peppy and unique fusion of Arabic and Kuthu styles draws the audience's attention with its simple yet catchy lyrics. Just like the tune, the lyrics is also an interesting Arabic Kuthu fusion featuring Arabic phrases and rhyming verses in Tamil".

== Accolades ==
Award (Note: Awards, festivals and organizations are in alphabetical order.)	Date of ceremony (Note: Date is linked to the article about the awards held that year, wherever possible.)	Category	Recipient(s)	Result	Ref.
South Indian International Movie Awards	16 September 2023	Best Female Playback Singer – Tamil	Jonita Gandhi ("Arabic Kuthu")	Won	
South Indian International Movie Awards	16 September 2023	Best Male Playback Singer – Tamil	Anirudh Ravichander ("Arabic Kuthu")	Nominated	
South Indian International Movie Awards	16 September 2023	Best Lyricist – Tamil	Sivakarthikeyan ("Arabic Kuthu")	Nominated	
Edison Awards	7 January 2023	Best Playback Singer – Male	Vijay ("Jolly O Gymkhana")	Won	
Edison Awards	7 January 2023	Best Playback Singer – Female	Jonita Gandhi ("Arabic Kuthu")	Won	
Ananda Vikatan Cinema Awards	30 March 2023	Best Playback Singer – Female	Jonita Gandhi ("Arabic Kuthu")	Nominated	
