= Arabic Kuthu =

2022 Indian song by Anirudh Ravichander and Jonita Gandhi

- Official song cover

Single by Anirudh and Jonita Gandhi

from the album Beast
- Language: Tamil
- Released: 14 February 2022
- Recorded: 2021
- Studio: Albuquerque Records, Chennai; Panchathan Record Inn and AM Studios, Chennai; Strings 7 Studio, Chennai; My Studio, Kochi; YRF Studios, Mumbai
- Genre: EDM, kuthu, Arabic music, dance, pop
- Length: 4:40
- Label: Sun Pictures, Sun TV (publisher)
- Composer: Anirudh
- Lyricist: Sivakarthikeyan
- Producer: Anirudh

Beast track listing
- 1. "Arabic Kuthu"; 2. "Jolly O Gymkhana"; 3. "Beast Mode"

Music video
- "Arabic Kuthu" on YouTube

"Arabic Kuthu" is an Indian Tamil-language song composed by Anirudh, who also sang the track alongside Jonita Gandhi, while the lyrics for the track were written by actor Sivakarthikeyan, for the soundtrack album of the 2022 film Beast, directed by Nelson. Starring Vijay and Pooja Hegde, the film is produced by Kalanithi Maran under the studio Sun Pictures. The first single to be released from the album, being highly expected from fans, was delayed multiple times.

The single was released on Valentine's Day (14 February 2022). It subsequently became the most-viewed and liked South Indian song within 24 hours, garnering 25 million views within a short period, and also the fastest South Indian song to cross 50 million views. The lyrical video has crossed more than 520 million views and the music video crossed over 750 million views in YouTube. The music video also peaked at no. 1 on the YouTube Global Music Video charts. The hook step dance involving Vijay and Pooja Hegde – the lead actors of Beast – became popular.

== Composition ==
This film marks Anirudh's third collaboration with Vijay after Kaththi (2014) and Master (2021), and with Nelson after Kolamaavu Kokila (2018) and Doctor (2021). Anirudh composed the tracks during mid-July 2021. In order to experiment with the film's music, he had composed this particular track in the style of Arabic music and featured lyrics in both Tamil and Arabic. The opening phrase, "Halamithi Habibo" translates to "I dreamed of my lover". Sivakarthikeyan wrote the lyrics to the track in mid-August 2021.

According to reports and as per the name, the track is a fusion Arabic music and Kuthu (a type of Tamil folk music). It also had mild influences of dance and pop music. The track was sung by Anirudh and Jonita Gandhi, who previously sung for "Chellamma" in Doctor. Anirudh, in his interaction with fans during a Facebook chat session, stated that the work on the first single had been completed and would be released later, and further clarified that all the updates regarding the film will be revealed post-completion of the film's shooting.

== Music video ==
=== Background and production ===
The music video, a direct clip from the film itself, features Vijay and Pooja Hegde dancing in an Arabian set. The music video was choreographed by Jani Master. In a deleted tweet, Jani had announced that the rehearsals for the song might take place during mid-April 2021, and the song will be shot within seven days, starting from the first week of May 2021. However, shooting did not take place, due to Vijay's decision to halt shooting in concern with the rise in COVID-19 cases in Tamil Nadu and furthermore, Hegde had also been diagnosed with COVID-19. The song was shot at Gokulam Studios during September 2021. To promote the single, Nelson shot a promotional video for the track featuring Vijay, Anirudh, Sivakarthikeyan and himself in December 2021.

=== Synopsis ===
In the context of the film, the music video is placed during a wedding in which Preethi (Hegde) meets Veera (Vijay) and describes him as the ideal partner she wished for. After a brief interaction, the music video follows and then is followed by Veera assaulting a man at the wedding for playing riskily with his child, due to Veera's PTSD.

== Marketing and release ==
The single was highly anticipated by fans, and was rumoured to be released on Anirudh's birthday (16 October 2021) and later scheduled for release on Diwali (4 November 2021), neither of these ended up happening. Makers stated that Sun Pictures' commitments to the release of Rajinikanth-starrer Annaatthe, and also the death of Puneeth Rajkumar insisted the makers not to release any update regarding the film on Diwali, which was posted on Ananda Vikatan's exclusive article about the film. The single was earlier planned to be released on New Year's Eve (31 December), and later to Pongal (14 January 2022), but could not be launched on that date.

The track was released on the occasion of Valentine's Day (14 February 2022), as Anirudh traditionally released singles on that date. The full music video was released on 9 May 2022, after the theatrical release of the film.

== Reception ==
=== Audience response ===
Vijay and Pooja Hegde's rolling step in the music video went viral and became a signature hook step and was recreated by millions in many short-video and social media platforms. Hegde's #ArabicKuthuChallenge went viral in social media, and many recreated the signature step.

=== Critical reviews ===
The Indian Express stated Sivakarthikeyan's lyrics as the highlights which "likely to go right over the head of the listeners". The review further added "The hook line of the song is 'malama pitha pithadhe' and it's hard to tell what it means. One can't even confidently tell if it has any base in the Arabic language. And that seems to be the fun part of the song. Composer Anirudh wants to make a point that as long as the music is enjoyable, people don't sweat over incomprehensible lyrics. You see, music has no language." Asuthosh Mohan of Film Companion called it as an "interesting fusion of Arabic and kuthu styles, repurposed to his (Anirudh's) own sensibility" and concluded that the track "works as a no-frills earworm that promises to get better with the visuals and choreography". Mohan explored the similarities of the track to that of "Mettalaa Hajbo" by Moroccan artist Karima Gouit, in terms of mood and rhythm. Khushboo Ratda of Pinkvilla reviewed: "Vijay's swag, Pooja Hegde's dance moves and Anirudh's music makes it a party anthem".

== Arabic Kuthu Challenge ==
Pooja Hegde's #ArabicKuthuChallenge went viral in social media, and many recreated the signature step. Many celebrities such as Shilpa Shetty, Jacqueline Fernandez, Rakul Preet Singh, Katrina Kaif, Samantha Ruth Prabhu, Keerthy Suresh, Rashmika Mandanna, Varun Dhawan, Atlee, Sivaangi Krishnakumar, Jai, Amritha Aiyer, Yashika Aannand, Krithi Shetty, Vedhika, and Anupama Parameswaran recreated the music video by performing the song's iconic hook step.

The "Arabic Kuthu Challenge" video had a cultural impact on several sportspersons including cricketers Devon Conway, Narayan Jagadeesan, Chezhian Harinishanth, Washington Sundar, Abhishek Sharma, Priyam Garg, Jagadeesha Suchith and Subramaniam Badrinath, all of whom recreated the viral hook step via social media. Players of the English association football team, Manchester United F.C., additionally took part in the challenge and performed the aforementioned step.

== Records ==
The track garnered over 17 million views in less than 10 hours, and eventually surpassed the 24-hour records of "Oo Antava Oo Oo Antava" from Pushpa: The Rise (2021) and "Kalaavathi" from Sarkaru Vaari Paata (2022), (Note: The track released a day before "Arabic Kuthu" being launched.) which garnered over 14 and 16 million views within 24 hours, respectively. It registered over 25 million real-time views within 24 hours, setting an all-time record for South India's most viewed song in 24 hours, and also reached the 20-million mark within less than 24 hours. It garnered over 2.5 million likes and became the most-liked South Indian song, and the second-most liked Indian song within 24 hours, behind the title track of Dil Bechara (2020). On 18 February, the song had garnered about 50-million views and became the fastest South Indian song to achieve this feat.

According to the digital media company Genius, the track was listed as one among the top 5 songs (in the fourth position) at the global charts and eventually peaked at the top of chart itself. The song reached 100 million views within 12 days breaking the record of "Rowdy Baby" which took 17 days to hit 100 million views.

== Other versions ==
Hindi and Telugu versions of the song titled as "Halamithi Habibo" was released on 4 April 2022. Lyrics of Hindi version was penned by Raqueeb Alam, whereas Sri Sai Kiran penned Telugu version. Malayalam and Kannada versions of the song was released on 21 June. Lyrics of Malayalam version was penned by Deepak Ram, whereas Varadaraj Chikkaballapura penned Kannada version. Dinker Kalvala replaced Anirudh in the Malayalam and Kannada versions of the song, while Jonita Gandhi recorded all versions. The songs Lo-fi version titled, "Halamithi Habibo (LoFi Version)" was released on 14 January 2024.

== Live performances ==
On 8 April 2022, Pooja Hegde, Anirudh and Nelson performed the song at a press meet held at Hyderabad for the film's promotion.

== Credits and personnel ==
Credits adapted from YouTube.

- Anirudh – composer
- Sivakarthikeyan – lyricist
- Anirudh – vocal
- Jonita Gandhi – vocal
- Jani Master – Choreographer
- Suren. G – mix engineer
- Alagiakoothan – sound designer

== In other media ==
The song was featured in the climax sequence of Vijay's film The Greatest of All Time (2024).

== Charts ==
Chart performances for "Arabic Kuthu"
Chart (2022)	Peak position
India (Billboard) Arabic Kuthu	9

== Accolades ==
Award (Note: Awards, festivals and organizations are in alphabetical order.)	Date of ceremony (Note: Date is linked to the article about the awards held that year, wherever possible.)	Category	Recipient(s)	Result	Ref.
South Indian International Movie Awards	16 September 2023	Best Female Playback Singer – Tamil	Jonita Gandhi	Won	
South Indian International Movie Awards	16 September 2023	Best Male Playback Singer – Tamil	Anirudh Ravichander	Nominated	
South Indian International Movie Awards	16 September 2023	Best Lyricist – Tamil	Sivakarthikeyan	Nominated	
Edison Awards	7 January 2023	Best Playback Singer – Female	Jonita Gandhi	Won	
Ananda Vikatan Cinema Awards	30 March 2023	Best Playback Singer – Female	Jonita Gandhi	Nominated	
