= Jolly O Gymkhana =

Single by Vijay, Anirudh Ravichander

from the album Beast
- Language: Tamil
- Released: 19 March 2022
- Recorded: 2021–2022
- Studio: Albuquerque Records, Chennai; Panchathan Record Inn and AM Studios, Chennai; Strings 7 Studio, Chennai; YRF Studios, Mumbai; Sai Sharavanam, Chennai
- Genre: Dance, pop, jazz, Baila music, Hawaiian music
- Length: 3:28
- Label: Sun Pictures, Sun TV (publisher)
- Composer: Anirudh Ravichander
- Lyricist: Ku Karthik
- Producer: Anirudh Ravichander

Beast track listing
- 1. "Arabic Kuthu"; 2. "Jolly O Gymkhana"; 3. "Beast Mode"

Music video
- "Jolly O Gymkhana" on YouTube

"Jolly O Gymkhana" (transl. Let's be jolly together) is an Indian Tamil-language song composed by Anirudh Ravichander and written by Ku. Karthik, which was sung by Vijay, for the soundtrack album of the 2022 film Beast. The film, directed by Nelson, Starring Vijay and Pooja Hegde, the film is produced by Kalanithi Maran under the studio Sun Pictures. After the huge success of the film's first single "Arabic Kuthu", the expectations for the second was also highly increased.

It was released on 19 March 2022 (released on YouTube as a lyrical video song) as the second single from the album. The full video song, featuring visuals directly from the film, was released on 2 May 2022 on YouTube. The song was also released in Hindi, Telugu, Malayalam and Kannada under the same title. The hook step dance involving Vijay and Hegde, became popular. The song's success inspired the title of the film of a 2024 film.

== Composition ==
This film marks Anirudh's third collaboration with Vijay after Kaththi (2014) and Master (2021), and with Nelson after Kolamaavu Kokila (2018) and Doctor (2021). Anirudh composed the tracks during mid-July 2021.

In August 2021, Vijay was reported to sing this track in his subsequent third collaboration with Anirudh as a singer, after "Selfie Pulla" from Kaththi (2014) and "Kutti Story" from Master (2021). Anirudh said to lyricist Ku Karthik that, the team wanted a celebratory and fun number for the film, and he got to know that he was the songwriter for one of the tracks in the film. This marked Vijay's 35th song, and Karthik's 50th film.

After Karthik penned its lyrics, the tune was composed within 30 minutes and Vijay recorded the vocals for the song in the morning, before the song shoot. According to Karthik, "Jolly O Gymkhana" translates to "come on, let’s be jolly together". In an interview to a media channel, Karthik explained the significance of the song that one should overcome the negative situations in life and live to the fullest. Karthik said that director Nelson simply wanted an enjoyable track and he completed the track within 30 minutes. "We were keen on doing a fun song with elements of what’s trending currently. Unlike people who heard songs on TVs and radios, today’s generation watches them on the internet and we were keen on catering to that crowd", he added.

The title of the song is a reference to the song "Jalilo Jimkana" from Amara Deepam (1956). Karthik said "We stuck to simple words and decided that 'Jolly O Gymkhana' as the hook-word would sound good with similar-sounding words like 'raasamma' and 'ramamma'". Amalraj said the song is more in the Spanish style, and he used nylon guitars and Goan violin for it".

== Music video ==
The music video, a direct clip from the film itself, features Vijay and Pooja Hegde dancing in an icy set, along with cast and crew. The music video was choreographed by Jani Master. The song was shot at Gokulam Studios in early-December 2021 and wrapped on 11 December 2021. Actor Sivakarthikeyan, who also wrote a film's song said that Don's song was being shot at the same location and Don film's team take pictures with Beast film's team. D. R. K. Kiran, the film's art director said the set was constructed in a cooler tones, with beachside and snow-capped sets.

== Marketing and release ==
The second was highly anticipated after the success of the film's first single "Arabic Kuthu". On 16 March 2022, the makers announced that the second single's release date along with the song teaser. Later, the makers released a fun promo featuring film's supporting casts and choreographer Jani. Instantly it became trending and received wider recognition with fans and celebrities appreciating the fun promo.

The song was released on 19 March 2022 (released on YouTube as a lyrical video song) as the second single from the album. The full video song, featuring visuals directly from the film, was released on 2 May 2022 on YouTube.

== Critical reception ==
The Indian Express called the song as an "absolute earworm" and said: "From the first frame, Vijay and Pooja Hegde have your attention [...] the song shows the actors performing some amazing dance steps, choreographed by Jani Master. The moment you see Vijay perform the hook step, it is a given that this will become yet another song that will trend for days with social media influencers making Instagram reels on it." Pinkvilla called the track as "fun, peppy and celebration number to groove". Thinkal Menon on OTTPlay wrote "The slow-paced, but trippy song has Vijay and Pooja Hegde impress with their chemistry and flawless dance moves once again, leaving fans into a tizzy. Anirudh's composition stands out, and Vijay, who has lent voice for the song, surprises with his singing skill again. The vibrant outfits of the actors in the video, stunning cinematography and simple lyrics by Ku Karthik are other impressive elements in the song. Murtuza Iqbal from BollywoodLife.com stated it as "a feel-good dance number with some upbeat music that will surely cheer you up. Visually, it’s a colourful track, and Vijay and Pooja’s breezy dance moves will surely grab your attention." The Times of India wrote "Thalapathy Vijay and Pooja Hegde set the dance floor on fire with the song." Only Kollywood rated the song 3/5 and wrote "This time, Anirudh hangs onto a sequel of Ullalaa, bringing in the holidaying mood with a baila-like beat. The awesomeness of the song completely belongs to Vijay, who takes it by the horns and delivers a cool and happy rendition. The song has some nice horns and jumps, which are its best bet. However, it does not achieve greatness due to the familiarity that it has within."

== Records ==
The promo of the song became the most viewed promo song surpassing the record views of "Arabic Kuthu" promo in 24 hours of its release. Upon its release, the song became second most viewed Tamil song in 24 hours of its release, and also reached 11.5 million viewers within 17 hours. The song was most-viewed South Indian song for second single.

It garnered over 1.5 million likes and became the second most-liked South Indian and Tamil Indian song within 24 hours.

== Impact ==
The song received positive reception from audiences, praising the music. Vijay and Pooja Hegde's rolling step in the music video went viral and became a signature hook step and was recreated by many, in many short-video and social media platforms. Many celebrities such as Priyanka Mohan, Yuvan Shankar Raja, Laya, and Shivani Narayanan too recreated the music video by dancing the signature step. Upon its release, the song started trending on internet and became a chartbuster. The success of the song further increased the expectations for the film.

The content creators Vikkals of Vikram became famous through this song. In June 2022, Shanthanu Bhagyaraj and Kiki Vijay started a podcast on Spotify under this song's name. In 2024, a film was created with the song's title.

== Other versions ==
Hindi and Telugu versions of the song were released on 6 April 2022. Whereas, Malayalam and Kannada versions of the song was released on 3 May. Lyrics of Hindi version was penned by Raqueeb Alam, whereas Chandrabose penned Telugu version. Lyrics of Malayalam version was penned by Deepak Ram, whereas Varadaraj Chikkaballapura penned Kannada version. Nakash Aziz replaced Vijay in the Hindi, Telugu and Kannada versions of the song, while Sri Krishna Vishnubhotla recorded Malayalam version of the song.

== Credits and personnel ==
Credits adapted from YouTube.

- Anirudh – composer
- Ku Karthik – lyricist
- Vijay – vocal
- Jani Master – Choreographer
- Suren. G – mix engineer
- Alagiakoothan – sound designer

== Charts ==
Chart performances for "Jolly O Gymkhana"
Chart (2022)	Peak position
United Kingdom (Asian Music Chart Top 40)	9

== Accolades ==
Award (Note: Awards, festivals and organizations are in alphabetical order.)	Date of ceremony (Note: Date is linked to the article about the awards held that year, wherever possible.)	Category	Recipient(s)	Result	Ref.
Edison Awards	7 January 2023	Best Playback Singer – Male	Vijay	Won	
Behindwoods Gold Medals	22 May 2022	Best choreographer	Jani Master	Won	
