= Aravindh =

Aravindh may refer to:

- Aravindh (song), by Anirudh Ravichander
- Aravindh Chithambaram (born 1999), Indian chess grandmaster
