= Kaathuvaakula Rendu Kaadhal =

2022 film directed by Vignesh Shivan

- Theatrical release poster
- Directed by: Vignesh Shivan
- Written by: Vignesh Shivan
- Produced by: S. S. Lalit Kumar; Vignesh Shivan
- Starring: Vijay Sethupathi; Nayanthara; Samantha
- Cinematography: S. R. Kathir; Vijay Kartik Kannan
- Edited by: A. Sreekar Prasad
- Music by: Anirudh Ravichander
- Production companies: Seven Screen Studio; Rowdy Pictures
- Distributed by: Red Giant Movies
- Release date: 28 April 2022
- Running time: 170 minutes
- Country: India
- Language: Tamil
- Box office: est.₹70 crore

Kaathuvaakula Rendu Kaadhal (transl. Two loves in a breeze) is a 2022 Indian Tamil-language romantic comedy film written and directed by Vignesh Shivan. It was produced by him under Rowdy Pictures, and co-produced by S. S. Lalit Kumar under Seven Screen Studio. The film stars Vijay Sethupathi, Nayanthara and Samantha in the lead roles alongside Prabhu, Kala Master, Redin Kingsley, Lollu Sabha Maaran and Shihan Hussaini. It follows a perpetually unlucky man whose luck changes when he falls in love with two women.

The film was initially announced in 2016. However, it was stalled, and Vignesh moved on to other projects. In February 2020, Vignesh re-announced the film. Principal photography commenced that December. It was shot in several locations including Chennai, Hyderabad, Pondicherry, Mysore, and wrapped by late-March 2022. The film has music composed by Anirudh Ravichander, cinematography jointly handled by S. R. Kathir with Vijay Kartik Kannan and editing by A. Sreekar Prasad.

Kaathuvaakula Rendu Kaadhal was released theatrically on 28 April 2022. It received mixed reviews from critics and audiences, who praised the performances of the main cast, soundtrack and background score but criticised the outdated script, length and climax. Despite this, the film was financially successful, grossing over ₹70 crore (US$7.3 million) at the box office.

== Plot ==
Ranjankudi Anbarasu Murugesa Boopathy Ohondhiran, or Rambo, is born into a family subject to a curse that states that anyone who weds into the family will die. Rambo's father, determined to break the curse, marries a local teacher named Minah Kaif while his brothers and sister remain unmarried. However, the curse strikes when Rambo's father accidentally slips from a tower and dies, announcing his son's birth. Minah suffers a stroke shortly after and becomes paralysed.

Rambo's uncles, aunt, and the whole village believe that the birth of Rambo brought negative luck that his father tried so hard to fight. Rambo grows up believing that he emanates ill luck wherever he goes. When his mother suffers a seizure in his presence, he runs away from the village for good, believing that his proximity to her makes her ill.

Now an adult, Rambo works two jobs to earn a living. During the day, he is a cab driver. At night, he is a bouncer at a pub. He meets Khatija Begum at the pub, and the two develop a friendship. One day, Rambo confronts Khatija's violent boyfriend, Mohammed Mobi, after he slaps her. Khatija breaks up with Mohammed and begins spending more time with Rambo.

While driving his cab, Rambo also meets Kanmani Ganguly, a saleswoman who raises her younger sister, Minmini, and her disabled brother, Bhargav. Kanmani seeks a husband who will allow her siblings to live with her after marriage, but she struggles to find one. Khatija and Kanmani develop feelings for Rambo, which Rambo reciprocates, and both women propose to him on the same day. Though Rambo is surprised that two fabulous women have fallen for him, he quickly realises that only their love has turned his bad luck around for good, so he accepts both proposals.

Not knowing how to proceed with his double love life, Rambo gets help from Prabhu, a reality show host, who makes Rambo concoct a story that he has a memory disorder that makes him forget events that happened during the day and night alternately. The ruse falls apart when Rambo reveals that he has memories of both women and is equally in love with both; it is up to them to sacrifice their love for the other person. Kanmani and Khatija refuse to do so and stand by their decision to marry Rambo. The three move in together, and though both women dislike each other at first, they strike up a friendship after the unexpected death of Khatija's father. The two women find out from a friend of Rambo's that the reality show was staged and kick him out of the house.

Rambo's friend asks them to travel to the village one last time to see Rambo's mother, who is seriously ill. Rambo decides not to go back as he fears his presence could worsen her condition. When he is forced to go, his mother miraculously recovers, leading the village to believe Rambo's presence now brings good luck. They beg Khatija and Kanmani to marry Rambo so the family's curse can be broken and all his aunts and uncles can get married. The women eventually agree and host a wedding ceremony for his entire family, not only Rambo.

After the rest of the family is married, Khatija and Kanmani leave the wedding, each sacrificing their love so the other person can marry Rambo. One year later, the three meet again, with Rambo saying their relationship was enough to break the curse. After the two women leave, Rambo shocks his neighbour by telling him that Katrina Kaif has started chatting with Rambo as his new girlfriend. Rambo tosses his phone and leaves Kaif waiting for him online.

== Cast ==
- Vijay Sethupathi as Ranjankudi Anbarasu Murugesa Boopathy Ohondhiran (Rambo)
  - Kamalesh as young Rambo
- Nayanthara as Kanmani Ganguly
- Samantha Ruth Prabhu as Khatija Begum
- Prabhu as his namesake, a Tamil game show host
- Kala Master as M. Idhayakala
- Dipika Kothari as Minmini Ganguly, Kanmani's sister
- Master Bhargav Sundar as Bhargav Ganguly, Kanmani's brother
- S. Sreesanth as Mohammed Mobi
- Seema as Minah Kaif, Rambo's mother
  - Divya Pillai as Young Minah Kaif
- Redin Kingsley as Arnold
- Maaran as Maaran, Rambo’s friend
- Dhilip Subbarayan as a drunk tenant
- Lollu Sabha Maaran as Maaran, Rambo's friend
- Shihan Hussaini as Rambo's neighbour
- Chitra Lakshmanan as Rambo's fake father
- Ravikanth as Khatija's father
- Ravi Raghavendra as the fake psychiatrist
- Bijili Ramesh as a chocobar seller
- Teju Ashwini as Khatija's friend
- Lingesan as Rambo's father
- Latha as Khatija's mother

== Production ==
=== Development ===
In 2016, Vignesh Shivan announced that Vijay Sethupathi would play the lead role in his next film, titled Kaathuvaakula Rendu Kaadhal; it would mark their second collaboration after Naanum Rowdy Dhaan (2015). Produced by A. M. Rathnam, the film was supposed to go into production in August 2016, but failed to materialise; Sethupathi moved on to act in Kavan (2017) and Vignesh decided to direct Thaanaa Serndha Koottam (2018). He also decided to direct a film produced by Lyca Productions starring Sivakarthikeyan. After this film was shelved, on 14 February 2020 (Valentine's Day), Vignesh officially re-announced Kaathuvaakula Rendu Kaadhal with Sethupathi still attached. He produced the film under his own banner, Rowdy Pictures, along with Lalit Kumar of Seven Screen Studio. Vijay Kartik Kannan and S. R. Kathir served as cinematographers. The film marked the debut of Shweta Sabu Cyril (daughter of art director Sabu Cyril), who joined the film's team as the production designer.

=== Casting ===
In February 2020 Nayanthara and Samantha Ruth Prabhu were announced as the lead actresses. Sethupathi and Nayanthara earlier acted in Naanum Rowdy Dhaan and Imaikkaa Nodigal (2018), where Sethupathi appeared in a cameo role, and Sethupathi reunited with Samantha after Super Deluxe (2019). Vignesh announced on 21 March 2021 (World Down Syndrome Day), that Bhargav Sundar, who has Down syndrome, would be joining the cast. He had been cast after the makers approached the Down Syndrome Association of Tamil Nadu. In December 2021, former Indian cricketer S. Sreesanth was announced to be making his acting debut in Tamil with this film. It was announced in December 2021 that dance choreographer Kala Master would make her acting debut with the film, as part of the supporting cast.

=== Filming ===
Principal photography was supposed to start in April 2020 but was delayed due to the COVID-19 lockdown in India. That May, the production house announced that filming would begin that August. On 10 December 2020, the film officially began production in Chennai. The film continued production through January 2021, and on 10 February 2021, Vignesh announced that the shooting of the second schedule had ended. By August 2021, shooting was happening in Pondicherry. In late August 2021, a video from the shooting spot surfaced into the internet. It had the lead actors recreating the song "Valai Osai" from Sathyaa (1988), and also wearing similar costumes. In early December 2021, the makers began post-production activities for the film, including dubbing works. On 9 December, Vignesh kickstarted the final shooting schedule in Mysore. Principal photography wrapped on 30 March 2022. The film was edited by A. Sreekar Prasad.

== Music ==
Kaathuvaakula Rendu Kaadhal

Soundtrack album by Anirudh Ravichander
- Released: 23 April 2022
- Recorded: 2020–2021
- Studios: Albuquerque Records, Chennai; Krimson Avenue Studios, Chennai
- Genre: Feature film soundtrack
- Length: 23:08
- Language: Tamil
- Label: Sony Music
- Producer: Anirudh Ravichander

Anirudh Ravichander chronology
Beast (2022)	Kaathuvaakula Rendu Kaadhal (2022)	Don (2022)

Singles from Kaathuvaakula Rendu Kaadhal
- 1. "Rendu Kaadhal" Released: 14 February 2021; 2. "Two Two Two" Released: 18 September 2021; 3. "Naan Pizhai" Released: 3 January 2022; 4. "Dippam Dappam" Released: 20 April 2022; 5. "Kaathu Vaakula Rendu" Released: 10 May 2022 (After the release of the film); 6. "Kanne Kanmaniyae" Released: 17 May 2022 (After the release of the film); 7. "Azha Thonudhe" Released: 17 May 2022 (After the release of the film)

The film's seven-song soundtrack was composed by Anirudh Ravichander in his 25th album. The first single "Rendu Kaadhal" was released on 14 February 2021, Valentine's Day. Though Vignesh announced that the second single would be released in July 2021 in an online interaction with fans, the song, which was later titled "Two Two Two," was eventually released on 18 September, which coincided with the director's birthday. The track received positive response from music critics, and actress Priyanka Chopra shared and praised the song through social media.

On 3 January 2022, the third single track "Naan Pizhai". Vocalist Ravi G was approached to sing the track after Anirudh and Vignesh liked one of his covers during the lockdown. In an interview with Srinivasa Ramanujam of The Hindu, Ravi said "What's most heartening is that it is a melody, which itself is a difficult proposition for composers to churn out in this age of fast-paced peppy numbers. The opportunity to explore such melodies in the film music space is scarce." The track crossed above 7 million views in YouTube within a week of its release there. On 20 April 2022, the fourth single "Dippam Dappam" was released.

All lyrics are written by Vignesh Shivan.

Track listing
No.	Title	Singer(s)	Length
1.	"Rendu Kaadhal"	Anirudh Ravichander, Shakthisree Gopalan, Aishwarya Suresh Bindra	4:20
2.	"Two Two Two"	Anirudh Ravichander, Sunidhi Chauhan, Sanjana Kalmanje	2:57
3.	"Naan Pizhai"	Ravi G, Shashaa Tirupati	4:05
4.	"Dippam Dappam"	Anthony Daasan, Anirudh Ravichander	3:26
5.	"Kaathu Vaakula Rendu"	Anirudh Ravichander, Santhosh Narayanan	3:55
6.	"Kanne Kanmaniyae"	Anirudh Ravichander	2:11
7.	"Azha Thonudhe"	Anirudh Ravichander	2:13
Total length:			23:08

== Release ==
=== Theatrical ===
Kaathuvaakula Rendu Kadhal released on 28 April 2022. It was initially slated for a theatrical release in December 2021 but due to the COVID-19 pandemic, the release was delayed. The film was later dubbed in Telugu as Kanmani Rambo Khatija.

=== Distribution ===
The Tamil Nadu distribution rights of the film were bought by Red Giant Movies. The film was distributed in the UK and Europe by Ahimsa Entertainment.

=== Home media ===
The film began streaming on Disney+ Hotstar from 27 May 2022.

== Reception ==
=== Box office ===
The film grossed over ₹70 crore (equivalent to ₹81 crore or US$8.4 million in 2026) in worldwide box office, becoming one of the highest-grossing Tamil films of the year.

=== Critical response ===
The film received mixed reviews. Soundarya Athimuthu of The Quint gave the rating 2.5 out of 5 stating that "The makers have hinted at it quite well because just like how Vijay Sethupathi as Rambo in the film smartly tries to justify cheating on two women at the same time, Director Vignesh Shivan with his quirky comedy, some beautifully placed emotional dialogues and heart touching lyrics also cheekily cheats the audience – making them believe that this is a one of a kind love story while all he did was, reimagine the rom-com genre by twisting the tale of the usual storyline – "two girls fight over a guy". But what feels somewhat good is that the hero is not completely rewarded at the end despite his mistakes as one would anticipate." Manoj Kumar R of The Indian Express gave the film's rating 2 out of 5 stating that "The latent nature of adult comedy in this movie is a big turn off. This film aims to play into the wild fantasies of a lovelorn man by subtly sexualising the leading ladies. But, it's neither clean humour nor an outright adult comedy. It's a mess. The main reason is Vignesh's indecisiveness. He wants to keep the film safe for people to watch it with family. And at the same time, sprinkle it with just enough double meaning dialogues and scenes so that people get the hint. It also wants to be a double-meaningful director C. S. Amudhan's Thamizh Padam, a spoof film, and Vignesh's 2015 hit Naanum Rowdy Dhaan. You can't have it both ways."

Logesh Balachandran from The Times of India gave 2.5 stars out of 5 stars and noted that "however manage only to recreate the same in parts.The mere presence of Vijay Sethupathi, Nayanthara and Samantha helps to elevate even ordinary scenes despite the sloppy writing. A single-shot scene in which Vijay Sethupathi delivers a lengthy dialogue again showcases the prowess of the actor and how a good actor can make a scene interesting." Srivatsan S from The Hindu noted that "Except for a few scattered laughs, this Vignesh Shivan directorial remains firmly bland despite featuring three brilliant actors" However, Hindustan Times critic Haricharan Pudipeddi noted that "The film, nevertheless, is salvaged by decent comedy and Anirudh’s splendid music. Vijay Sethupathi is at his effortless best on screen, and alongside both Nayanthara and Samantha, we get some lovely moments between the trio. The film does feel dragged post interval but by the end, it makes up for the problematic plot." Avinash Ramachandran from Cinema Express gave 2.5 out of rating and said that "For almost half its running time, Kaathuvaakula Rendu Kaadhal explores the idea of a specific type of mental illness. Around halfway point, it seems like the film realises its folly and the makers dodged the ‘wrongful representation’ bullet.' Priyanka Thirumurthy of The News Minute gave 2.5 stars out of 5 and said that "Vijay Sethupathi has done an admirable job in the role given to him. We only wish that when such a firecracker cast was brought together, the script was fitting for their talent."
