= Beast (2022 Indian film) =

2022 Indian film by Nelson Dilipkumar

- Theatrical release poster
- Directed by: Nelson Dilipkumar
- Written by: Nelson Dilipkumar
- Produced by: Kalanithi Maran
- Starring: Vijay; Pooja Hegde
- Cinematography: Manoj Paramahamsa
- Edited by: R. Nirmal
- Music by: Anirudh Ravichander
- Production company: Sun Pictures
- Distributed by: see below
- Release date: 13 April 2022
- Running time: 159 minutes
- Country: India
- Language: Tamil
- Budget: ₹130–150 crore
- Box office: est. ₹216–300 crore (Note: Beast's reported worldwide grosses vary between ₹216 crore (CNBC TV18) – ₹240 crore (The Indian Express) – ₹300 crore (India Today and Puthiya Thalaimurai))

Beast is a 2022 Indian Tamil-language action comedy film written and directed by Nelson Dilipkumar. It is produced by Kalanithi Maran under Sun Pictures. The film stars Vijay and Pooja Hegde in the lead roles, alongside Selvaraghavan, Shaji Chen, VTV Ganesh, Ankur Vikal, Aparna Das, Sathish Krishnan, Shine Tom Chacko, Yogi Babu and Redin Kingsley. It is about an ex-RAW agent who seeks to rescue hostages in a shopping mall which has been hijacked by terrorists.

Sun Pictures acquired the production rights for Vijay's 65th film in January 2020. A. R. Murugadoss was initially signed to direct it; however, he was ousted from the film, after he refused to cut his remuneration. Nelson was subsequently brought on board, with announcement in December 2020 under the tentative title Thalapathy 65, and the official title was announced in June 2021. Principal photography commenced in April 2021. It was shot in several locations including Chennai, Delhi and Georgia, and wrapped by mid-December 2021. The film has music composed by Anirudh Ravichander, cinematography was handled by Manoj Paramahamsa and editing by R. Nirmal.

Beast was released on 13 April 2022 in theatres and received mixed reviews from critics. Despite this, the film was a commercial success, grossing ₹216–300 crore worldwide. It set several box office records for a Tamil film, emerging as the third highest-grossing Tamil film of 2022, tenth highest-grossing Indian film of 2022 and was one of the highest-grossing Tamil films of all time.

== Plot ==
Veera Raghavan, a RAW field agent, is stationed in Pakistan for three months to capture Umar Farooq, a notorious terrorist. During his time undercover, he blends into local life with ease. He is shown getting along warmly with the locals, especially a small child who adores him. He often pretends to lose to her little tricks, lets her outsmart him for fun, and buys her balloons. He also grows close to the child's mother, who often brings him food and treats him with kindness. In a place where he is meant to remain detached, he slowly becomes part of the neighborhood. One day, Veera receives an urgent call from the tactical team: Farooq has already arrived and plans to leave soon because they found out an Indian spy is nearby and traced to meet him. If they wait any longer, the entire mission could collapse. To stop Farooq from escaping, Veera moves into action. He infiltrates the hideout and takes down many of Farooq's men in brutal close combat. Since intelligence wants Farooq captured alive, killing him is not an option. As Farooq attempts to flee in a vehicle, Veera prepares to fire a missile to disable the escape route. Unable to fully see the outer perimeter from his position, Veera asks command if the area is clear of civilians. At that same moment, the little child from earlier is outside, running after the balloon he had bought her. The team sees this but chooses to hide it. They tell Veera the perimeter is clear and instruct him to focus only on the mission, not the possible collateral damage. Trusting their word, Veera fires. The missile strikes Farooq's vehicle, halting the escape and allowing the team to capture Farooq. But in the aftermath, as smoke clears and chaos settles, Veera notices a familiar balloon drifting through the air. Then it hits him.The child he had laughed with, cared for, and unknowingly placed in danger was caught in the blast. She is badly injured and dies because of the strike he launched. A traumatised Veera quits the agency and returns to Chennai.

11 months later, Veera has PTSD and traumatic memories of the child. At the insistence of his psychiatrist, Veera attends a wedding and meets Preethi, and they fall for each other. Preethi convinces him to join "Domnic & Soldiers", a failing security agency led by Domnic Irudhayaraj. Meanwhile, the Government of Tamil Nadu receives intel that terrorists are planning a massive terror attack at East Coast Mall in Chennai. Along with Preethi and Domnic, Veera visits the mall, the last client of the agency, where he observes several suspicious activities and deduces that someone else has taken over the mall. Later, Umar Saif, Farooq's brother, and his sleeper cells—all disguised as Santa Claus—open fire and hijack the mall, thus proving Veera's suspicions. Veera, Preethi, Domnic and a couple of other people hide inside an unopened restaurant. Led by Deputy NSA Althaf Hussain, the government tries to negotiate with the terrorists, who demand the release of Farooq.

Althaf learns that Veeraraghavan is inside the mall. He manages to establish contact with him and tries to convince him to help them. Though initially hesitant, Veera realises that the terrorists are there to initiate Farooq's release. He kills one of the terrorists, captures another alive, and brings him to their hideout. Veera manages to infiltrate the terrorists under disguise and eliminates some of them. The Home Minister, who is in cahoots with Saif and his gang of terrorists, gets them to stage the execution of his wife and daughter, Aparna, inside the mall on live television. Enraged about the government's decision to release Farooq, Veera retaliates and kidnaps the Home Minister's wife and daughter, pretends to be a Bangladeshi militant to confuse the terrorists, and threatens to kill them if Farooq is released.

Sensing his impending defeat, Saif seemingly gives up and slips into the crowd, pretending to be a hostage. He soon figures out Veera's real identity from Domnic, which allows him and his sleeper cells to capture him. With Aparna's help, Veera manages to escape and eliminate Saif and his gang of terrorists while ensuring that the hostages flee to safety. The police arrest the Home Minister for working with the terrorists and his involvement in the mall hijacking. Despite all the negotiations, the government releases Farooq from prison and drops him at the India–Pakistan border. A few months later, Veera recaptures Farooq in Pakistan and brings him back to India after surviving a long air chase. Following the successful operation, Veera, Preethi, Domnic, and the rest of his crew celebrate their escapades in Goa.

== Cast ==
- Vijay as Veeraraghavan "Veera"
- Pooja Hegde as Preethi, Veera's love interest
- Selvaraghavan as Althaf Hussain
- Shaji Chen as the corrupt Home Minister
- VTV Ganesh as Domnic Irudhayaraj
- Sathish Krishnan as Ramachandran (Raama)
- Ankur Vikal as Umar Saif, Umar Farooq's brother and lead terrorist
- Aparna Das as Aparna, Home Minister's daughter
- Shine Tom Chacko as a terrorist who helps Veera
- Yogi Babu as Jill
- Redin Kingsley as Jack
- Sunil Reddy as Mahaali
- Shiva Arvind as Killi
- Sujatha Babu as Aparna's mother
- Lilliput as Umar Farooq
- Subbalakshmi as a hostage
- Prudhvi Raj as Veera's psychiatrist
- Cell Murugan as the Home Minister's assistant
- Pawan Chopra as Madhav Singh
- Gayathri Shan as a Muslim victim in the mall, whom Veera saves (uncredited)

Additionally, director Nelson Dilipkumar, music composer Anirudh, cinematographer Manoj Paramahamsa, choreographer Jani, and Bjorn Surrao appear in cameo appearances as themselves in the song "Jolly O Gymkhana".

== Production ==
=== Development ===
In November 2019, it was revealed that Vijay had signed his 65th film following Master (2021), which he was currently filming. The following January, Kalanithi Maran's Sun Pictures was reported to fund the project, collaborating with the actor after Vettaikaaran (2009), Sura (2010) and Sarkar (2018). Multiple directors, including Magizh Thirumeni, S. Shankar, Sudha Kongara, Pandiraj, R. Ajay Gnanamuthu and Vetrimaaran were reported to direct it. However, that March, it was reported that AR Murugadoss would direct the project, tentatively titled Thalapathy 65. Production was reportedly set to begin the following month; however, it did not happen. Thaman S was brought on board to score the music, in his maiden collaboration with Vijay, whilst Tamannaah Bhatia was approached as the female lead in her second collaboration with the actor after Sura.

Murugadoss narrated the final script to Vijay in early August 2020. Following his approval, the team reported in mid-August 2020 that Thalapathy 65 will enter production soon, with an official announcement on the occasion of Ganesh Chaturthi (22 August 2020), which did not happen. In an interview, Murugadoss stated that the script was not a sequel to any of his previous films, but an original one. The team further brought the stunt choreographer duo Anbariv on board, which marked their first collaboration with Vijay, and cinematographer Manoj Paramahamsa, who confirmed his presence in February 2021.

Vijay was initially said to receive ₹100 crore as a remuneration for the project, but due to the financial constraints owing to the COVID-19 pandemic, he decided to waive off 30% from his salary, thus getting ₹70 crore as remuneration. Maran insisted Murugadoss to reduce his salary post the failure of his previous directorial, Darbar (2020). But as Murugadoss refused his demands, Sun Pictures ousted him from the project in October 2020. The producers later planned to bring either S. J. Suryah, Nelson Dilipkumar, or Magizh Thirumeni on board to direct the project, with Nelson being insisted by composer Anirudh, who worked with Vijay in Master, to direct the film.

=== Pre-production ===
"Beast was written with Vijay sir in mind. We know his stature and what he can do well. I took up an idea that needed all that. And then I tried to do something different within that. It was convincing to sir and it also worked for me. So I didn't purposefully change something for him. Only he can do this film."

— Nelson Dilipkumar, in an interview with film critic Baradwaj Rangan

On 10 December 2020, Sun Pictures announced that Thalapathy 65 will be directed by Nelson, and Anirudh was also brought on board to score music; this project marks his third collaboration with Vijay and Nelson after their respective films, Kaththi (2014), Master, Kolamaavu Kokila (2018) and Doctor (2021). Manoj and Anbariv who were part of Murugadoss' proposed project with Vijay were retained for this film. R. Nirmal, who worked with Nelson in Kolamaavu Kokila and Doctor was announced as the film editor, while D. R. K. Kiran handled the production design for this film. Anbariv said that the film would have "extraordinary" stunt sequences similar to those in KGF: Chapter 1 (2018).

Nelson had parallelly worked on the film's script along with the post-production works of Doctor as the final script was to be drafted. During that period, he simultaneously began location scouting for the film and shared a few pictures from Russia through his Instagram page. Vijay was reported to play a "sharp and humorous" character. While the film was launched under the tentative title Thalapathy 65, the film's title Beast was announced on 21 June 2021, on the eve of Vijay's birthday.

In November 2021, a Diwali edition published in November by the magazine Ananda Vikatan revealed the main plot: an invasion taking place in a shopping mall, where terrorists hold a bunch of shoppers hostage, and how the protagonist saves them. Most of the events take place in the mall. While primarily in the action genre, the film also features elements of black comedy and synchronised comical characters, usually seen in the director's films. Nelson described Beast as "60 percent action and 40 percent humour", while acknowledging Pokkiri (2007) as an influence on the film.

=== Casting ===
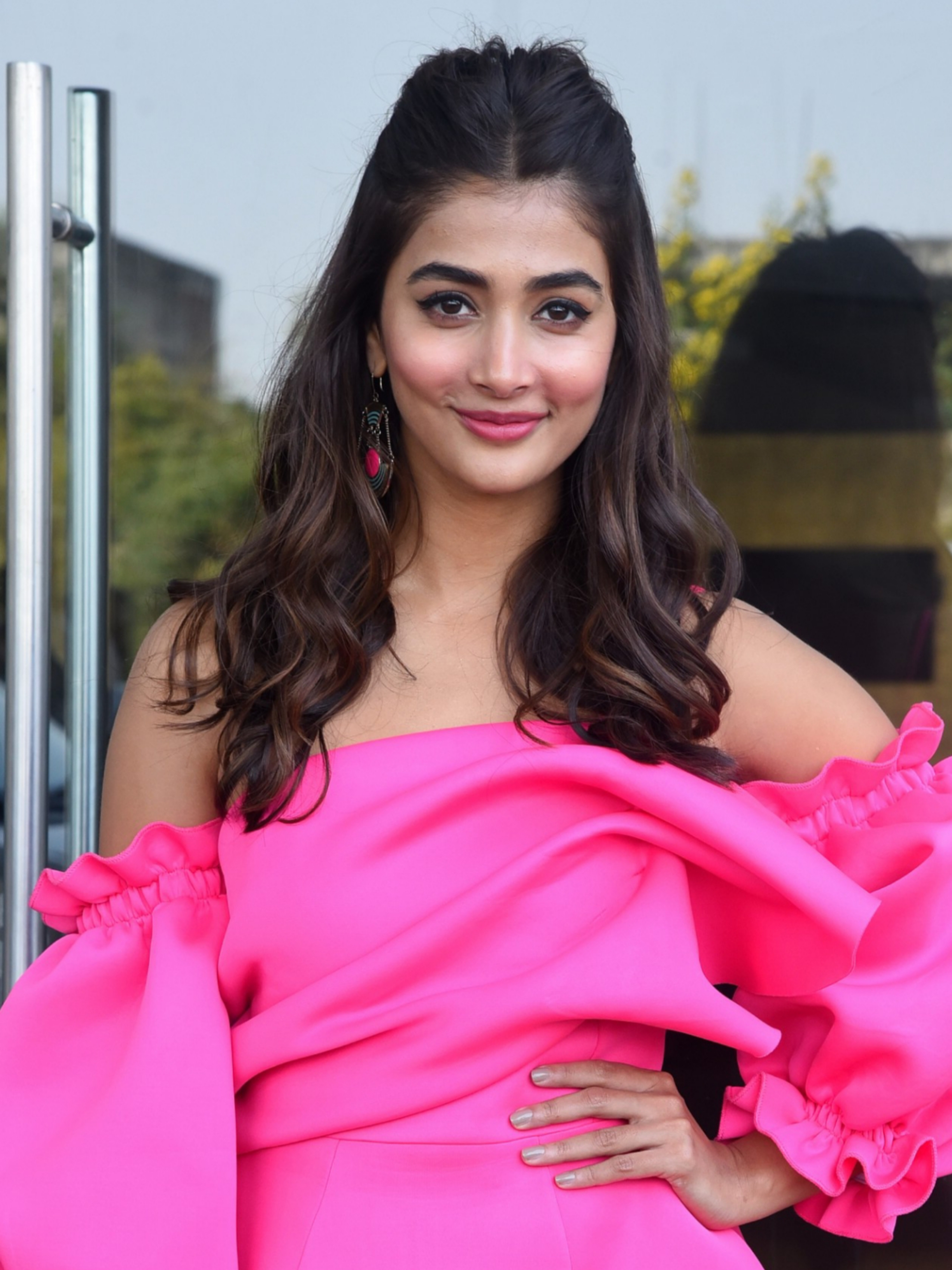
Pooja Hegde was cast as the lead actress, making her return to Tamil cinema after Mugamoodi (2012).

Vijay portrays Veera Raghavan, a RAW agent. Nelson compared him to the characters James Bond and John Wick. In January 2021, Pooja Hegde was reported to be the lead actress, and hinted her inclusion in an interview in February 2021. Her inclusion was confirmed by Sun Pictures on 24 March 2021. The film marks her return to Tamil cinema after a decade, following her debut in the film industry with Mugamoodi (2012). Hegde allotted 50 days for Beast, and a remuneration of ₹3.5 crore was offered to her. After reports emerged that the team was planning to cast a second female lead, they denied this, stating there was no room for more leading actors in the film and the script did not demand for it. Hegde said the film properly combines the filmmaking style of Nelson, and the acting style of Vijay. Nelson said he wanted an actress who could match Vijay's height and decided on Hedge, then fresh off from the success of the Telugu film Ala Vaikunthapurramuloo (2020).

In March 2021, VTV Ganesh was revealed as being a part of the cast after being present in the launch event. Kavin, who was also present, denied being part of the cast, but said three months later that he was working as an assistant director. Malayalam actress Aparna Das announced her presence in the project in April. In May 2021, Malayalam actor Shine Tom Chacko joined the cast, making his Tamil debut. Yogi Babu confirmed his presence in the project in June, collaborating with Vijay for the fifth time after Velayudham (2011), Mersal (2017), Sarkar (2018) and Bigil (2019). On 7 August 2021, Sun Pictures announced that Selvaraghavan would be acting in the film. The same day they formally confirmed the casting of Shine Tom Chacko and Aparna Das, and announced Ankur Vikal was part of the film. Nelson said he wanted a relatively new face for a certain role, and Selvaraghavan immediately accepted when approached. The film is Selvaraghavan's debut as an actor.

Choreographer-cum-actor Sathish Krishnan joined the film's cast during the second schedule. The film was reported to have three antagonists. On 25 August, Smruthi, Janani Durga, Madhuri Watts and Hasini Pavithra were cast in undisclosed roles. On 1 October, Cinema Vikatan reported that Shaji Chen would play an important role in the film. In mid-October, it was reported that Sujatha Babu, who works as television reporter in Sun News channel, would appear in the film. Redin Kingsley, a regular in Nelson's films, joined in the same month. On 28 November, Nelson released a behind-the-scenes still confirming the involvements of singer-songwriter Bjorn Surrao, Sunil Reddy and Shiva Arvind, all three of whom worked in the director's previous film Doctor. Sunil Reddy and Shiva Arvind reprise their roles from Doctor as Mahaali and Killi.

=== Filming ===
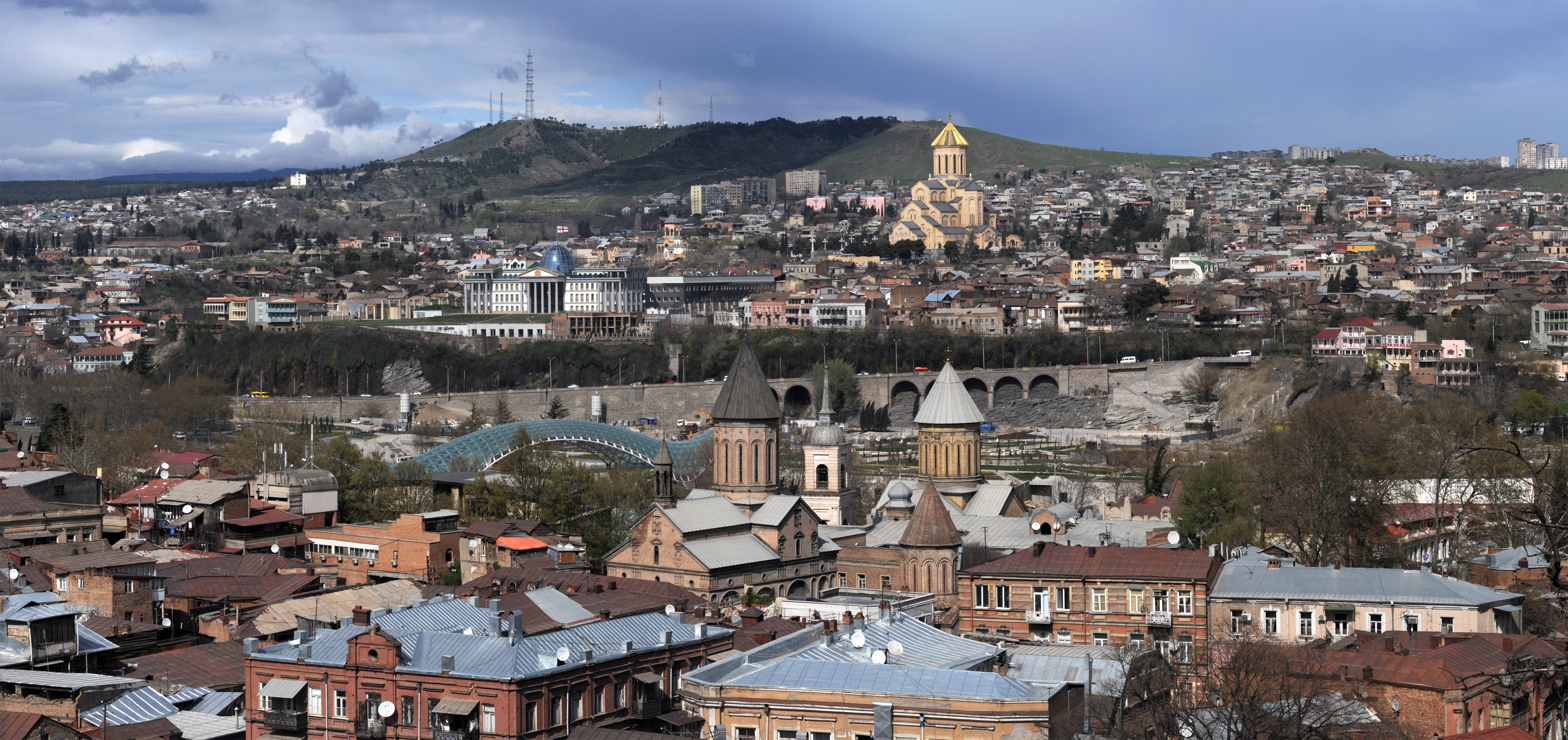
Part of the film was shot at Tbilisi, Georgia

A test shoot for Thalapathy 65 was held on 10 February 2021 at the office of Sun TV Network in Chennai. On 31 March 2021, the film was launched at Sun TV Studios, with a formal puja ceremony. However, Hegde was not present at the launch, due to her busy schedules. After the 2021 Tamil Nadu Legislative Assembly election, Vijay and Nelson headed to Georgia for the film's shooting schedule on 7 April 2021. Sun Pictures released a post from the shooting location on 9 April, revealing that the film entered production. The team shot 30% of the film in Georgia and rest of the shoot in Chennai, because of restrictions due to the second wave of the pandemic. Vijay returned to Chennai on 26 April, after filming in Georgia for 15 days, where an introductory song and few action sequences were shot.

For the second schedule, a huge shopping mall was replicated at the EVP Film City in Chennai since malls were shut in Tamil Nadu owing to COVID-19 restrictions. Nelson had previously scouted Delhi for malls to shoot in, but ultimately desisted due to the difficulties involved in crowd control. However, Vijay asked the team to suspend production due to the rise in COVID-19 cases and the statewide lockdown prevailing in Tamil Nadu. The song shoot of the film was scheduled for shoot on mid-May 2021 was also stalled after Hegde was diagnosed with COVID-19. Filming resumed in July 2021, with the second schedule lasting for 20 days. A sequence was filmed at East Coast Road, where Valimai was being shot and a huge set was constructed at the location. Reports also claimed that shooting of the film progressed at Intercontinental Chennai Mahabalipuram Resort. The team moved to Gokulam Studios for filming major sequences. The film's third schedule began in Chennai on 2 August 2021 and went for more than three weeks.

The entire schedule was completed on 23 August 2021, and the team continued to shoot the recurring sequences at Gokulam Studios on 1 September 2021. A song sequence being picturised on Vijay and Hegde, choreographed by Jani Master, was shot in early September. The fourth schedule began in Delhi on 20 September. The next schedule began in Chennai after 28 September. By late October, reportedly over 70% of filming was complete, and the film is scheduled to wrap up by late-December.

For the climax action sequences, the team planned to shoot the film in Russia, which was later dropped. Instead, the team decided to go to Georgia again for the final schedule, to shoot a scene involving a younger version of Vijay's character. Manoj Paramahamsa purchased a new Tiltamax rig for the shoot in Georgia, and later a RED V-raptor camera was brought so as to shoot the action sequences in high resolution. Hegde returned to Chennai to shoot for the film in November 2021. But due to heavy rains in Chennai, the sets were flooded although none of the cast members were hurt. It has been also reported that the interiors in the sets were not damaged due to floods. Filming wrapped on 11 December 2021 completing a song shoot. The team later reunited for patchwork filming.

=== Post-production ===
Post-production of the film began simultaneously with the wrapping-up of filming in December 2021. Vijay finished dubbing for his character the same month. Bejoy Arputharaj was the visual effects supervisor of the film, along with Phantom FX, the film's principal visual effects studio. S. Alagiakoothan worked on sound design and Suren. G handled final sound editing and mixing of the film.

== Music ==
The soundtrack is composed by Anirudh Ravichander, in his third collaboration with both Vijay and Nelson, respectively after Kaththi (2014), Master (2021) and Kolamaavu Kokila (2018) and Doctor. The soundtrack consists of three original songs composed by Anirudh, namely, "Arabic Kuthu", "Jolly O Gymkhana", and "Beast Mode". The lyrics were written by Sivakarthikeyan, Ku Karthik and Vivek.

== Marketing ==
The first look poster of Beast which released on 21 June 2021, shared through Vijay's official Twitter account, was the most liked and retweeted tweet in the entertainment section, according to a survey report by Twitter. The official trailer of the film was released on 2 April 2022. It became the most watched Tamil and South Indian trailer in 24 hours with over 30 million views on YouTube.

== Release ==
=== Theatrical ===
Beast was released in theatres on 13 April 2022, in the week of Puthandu. Apart from Tamil, the film had dubbed versions in Hindi (titled Raw), Telugu, Malayalam and Kannada.

=== Distribution ===
The distribution rights for Tamil Nadu are held by Red Giant Movies. The Telugu version is distributed by Sri Venkateswara Creations, Suresh Productions and Asian Cinemas, the Malayalam version by Magic Frames, and the Hindi version by UFO Moviez. Ahimsa Entertainment distributed and released the film in the United States. The film was banned in Kuwait and Qatar, though an official explanation was not provided. Beast did not release in Karur district of Tamil Nadu due to a dispute between Karur theatre owners and distributors over the quoted price for the film.

=== Home media ===
Beast was made available for streaming, on 11 May 2022, in both Sun NXT and Netflix, in Tamil alongside dubbed versions in Telugu, Malayalam and Kannada languages, as well as a Hindi dubbed version by the title RAW. The original Tamil version premiered on television on 24 October 2022 on Sun TV, during Diwali.

== Reception ==
=== Critical response ===
Beast received mixed reviews from critics, who praised cast performances, soundtrack, musical score, visuals and entertainment factor but criticised the weak storyline, pace and screenplay. On the review aggregator website Rotten Tomatoes, 43% of 7 critics' reviews are positive, with an average rating of 4.9/10.

Soundarya Athimuthu of The Quint said, "Beast is neither Nelson's film nor Vijay's film. It's good but not the best combination, where Nelson tries to cater more to the Vijay fans and Vijay tries to fit into Nelson's wacky world." Ashameera Aiyappan of Firstpost rated the film 3/5 stars and wrote "Vijay is surrounded by eccentric and flamboyantly funny characters, but as cliches pile up, the irreverent jokes aren't enough to keep this beast alive". Divya Nair of Rediff.com rated the film 3/5 stars and wrote, "Leave logic behind, sit back and watch Vijay do the impossible". Simon Abrams reviewed the film for RogerEbert.com with 3/5 stars and wrote "Vijay's all-things-for-everyone self-image is celebrated throughout, as in the chorus of one anthemic song that hails the chipmunk-cheeked hero as leaner, meaner, stronger".

M. Suganth of The Times of India rated the film 2.5/5 stars and wrote "The director seems to have banked entirely on his star to carry the film, but with a script that hardly offers him anything to work with, even Vijay can only do so much with his star power. Janani K of India Today rated 2.5/5 and wrote "It is Vijay's show all the way and he headlines this clichéd thriller". Manoj Kumar R. of The Indian Express rated the film 2.5/5 and termed it as "an unapologetic crowd-pleaser and a solid service to Vijay's core fanbase".

Srinivasa Ramanujam of The Hindu stated, "Beast is a dull and tedious affair". Sowmya Rajendran of The News Minute rated the film 2.5/5 stars and wrote "Nelson tries to be imaginative and break out of cliches but he keeps using the oldest tricks in the book whenever he runs out of ideas". Vivek M V of Deccan Herald rated the film 2.5/5 stars and wrote "The film's major plot points are silly. Towards the end, the feeling of watching an outdated, one-man show film is inevitable". Haricharan Pudipeddi of Hindustan Times stated, "This Vijay and Pooja Hegde film is a Die Hard-inspired thriller but suffers due to weak writing". Saibal Chatterjee of NDTV, reviewing the Hindi version of the film, rated it 2.5/5 and said, "We are going with half an extra star because Beast draws attention in its own facile but essential way to something that no contemporary Bollywood movie will – the cynical ways in which pettifogging politicians seek to derive electoral brownie points from the bravery of soldiers and the misery of the masses".

Jose K George of The Week rated the film 2/5 and said, "This time around, the director isn't even going for the sardonic humor that he opted for in his earlier flicks, but treads the slapstick route, making it impossible for the audience to be worried about the safety of those trapped inside the mall. The movie also suffers due to the lack of a menacing antagonist". Josh Hurtado of The Austin Chronicle rated the film 2/5 and said, "Lackluster performances, confusing tonal shifts, and limp action sequences leave Beast in a kind of crossover purgatory. Neither universally entertaining nor quite bonkers enough to draw in Tamil-film newbies, this might be one for established fans only". Manisha Lakhe, writing for Moneycontrol, reviewed the Hindi version and said, "I was too numb to leave when the mindless beach song came on, but the cleaning crew nudged me towards the exit. I survived!".

In response to the mixed reviews, Nelson said that his calculations were wrong as the writing and staging, did not translate as effectively on screen as intended.

=== Box office ===
There were reports of the movie collecting ₹38 crore and ₹40 crore on release day in Tamil Nadu; however Box Office India stated that those numbers were hugely inflated in their second day report. After three days of run the film grossed ₹127 crore. A report in The Times of India stated that the film grossed ₹65 crore worldwide on its opening day and ₹32 crore on the second day, ₹30 crore on the third day and ₹25 crore on the fourth day with a worldwide total of ₹152 crore. After five days of its run, The Times of India reported the film collected ₹195 crore. Beast collected ₹6 crore in North India. The film collected ₹210 crore after seven days. After thirteen days of its run the film grossed ₹230 crore. It was published by The Times of India that the film grossed ₹250 crore after 25 days of theatrical run. The film grossed ₹216–300 crore worldwide. It set several box office records for a Tamil film, emerging as the third highest-grossing Tamil film of 2022, tenth highest-grossing Indian film of 2022 and one of the highest-grossing Tamil film of all time.

== Accolades ==
Award (Note: Awards, festivals and organisations are in alphabetical order.)	Date of ceremony (Note: Date is linked to the article about the awards held that year, wherever possible.)	Category	Recipient(s)	Result	Ref.
South Indian International Movie Awards	16 September 2023	Best Female Playback Singer – Tamil	Jonita Gandhi ("Arabic Kuthu")	Won	
South Indian International Movie Awards	16 September 2023	Best Male Playback Singer – Tamil	Anirudh Ravichander ("Arabic Kuthu")	Nominated	
South Indian International Movie Awards	16 September 2023	Best Lyricist – Tamil	Sivakarthikeyan ("Arabic Kuthu")	Nominated	
South Indian International Movie Awards	16 September 2023	Best Actor in a Comedy Role	VTV Ganesh	Nominated	
Edison Awards	7 January 2023	Mass Hero of the Year	Vijay	Nominated	
Edison Awards	7 January 2023	Favourite Actress	Pooja Hegde	Nominated	
Edison Awards	7 January 2023	Best Director	Nelson Dilipkumar	Nominated	
Edison Awards	7 January 2023	Best Music Director	Anirudh Ravichander	Nominated	
Edison Awards	7 January 2023	Best Playback Singer – Male	Vijay ("Jolly O Gymkhana")	Won	
Edison Awards	7 January 2023	Best Playback Singer – Female	Jonita Gandhi ("Arabic Kuthu")	Won	
Edison Awards	7 January 2023	Best Supporting Role – Male	Selvaraghavan	Won	
Edison Awards	7 January 2023	Best Comedian	Yogi Babu	Nominated	
Ananda Vikatan Cinema Awards	30 March 2023	Best Comedian	VTV Ganesh	Nominated	
Ananda Vikatan Cinema Awards	30 March 2023	Best Cinematographer	Manoj Paramahamsa	Nominated	
Ananda Vikatan Cinema Awards	30 March 2023	Best Artwork	D. R. K. Kiran	Nominated	
Ananda Vikatan Cinema Awards	30 March 2023	Best Playback Singer – Female	Jonita Gandhi ("Arabic Kuthu")	Nominated	

== Sequel ==
Owing to the film's success, Nelson, in an interview, asserted the possibility of a sequel to the film. In August 2023, he announced his plans to make a sequel.

== Potential remake ==
In January 2022, several production companies were in talks to take the Hindi remake rights of the film. Later, Sajid Nadiadwala under Nadiadwala Grandson Entertainment bought the rights for the Hindi remake.
