= Aravindh (song) =

Song by Anirudh Ravichander
- Language: Tamil; Telugu
- Released: 14 June 2026
- Genre: Indian pop
- Label: Albuquerque Records
- Songwriters: Super Subu; Srinivasa Mouli

"Aravindh" is a song composed and sung by the Indian musician Anirudh Ravichander and written by Super Subu. It is the first song produced under Anirudh's label Albuquerque Records, in partnership with Universal Music India. The song was released on 14 June 2026 in Tamil and Telugu languages, with lyrics for the Telugu version written by Srinivasa Mouli.

== Composition ==
"Aravindh" is the first song produced under Anirudh's label Albuquerque Records, partnering with Universal Music India. It has been described as having pop and hip-hop influences. The song is dedicated to Anirudh's friend Aravinth Baskaran, an audio engineer who died in 2014. That same year, Anirudh had dedicated the soundtrack of Kaththi in his honour. The song is satirical in nature and depicts the struggles of an independent musician trying to stay afloat in the "fast-evolving digital music landscape". Within the song, "Aravindh" is Anirudh's alter-ego and he said, "Aravindh is everybody in some way. We all have an Aravindh in our lives", adding that it is meant to reflect his early struggles and rise to fame and hoped it would relate to other independent musicians too. It also criticises the trend of songs achieving short-lived success through virality, social media and paid promotions, with Anirudh hoping "Aravindh" would achieve long-lasting fame. The dance steps in the music video of "Aravindh" were choreographed by Jani Master. Anirudh received backlash for collaborating with Jani because of a pending sexual harassment case against the latter.

== Release and reception ==
The original Tamil version of "Aravindh" was released on 14 June 2026 both in streaming services and YouTube. The Telugu version was released the same day on streaming services, but the YouTube video came four days later, on 18 June. Mirchi.in wrote that viewers appreciated Anirudh for "pour[ing] his heart out" and criticising the music industry for previously not allowing him to create "soulful" and "sweet" songs to his liking. The video of the Tamil version gained 13 million views in 13 days.

== Credits and personnel ==
Credits adapted from YouTube.

- Anirudh Ravichander – composer
- Super Subu – lyricist (Tamil)
- Anirudh Ravichander – vocals
- Srinivasa Mouli – lyricist (Telugu)
- Keba Jeremiah – Acoustic and electric guitars
