= Anirudh Ravichander =

Indian composer and playback singer (born 1990)

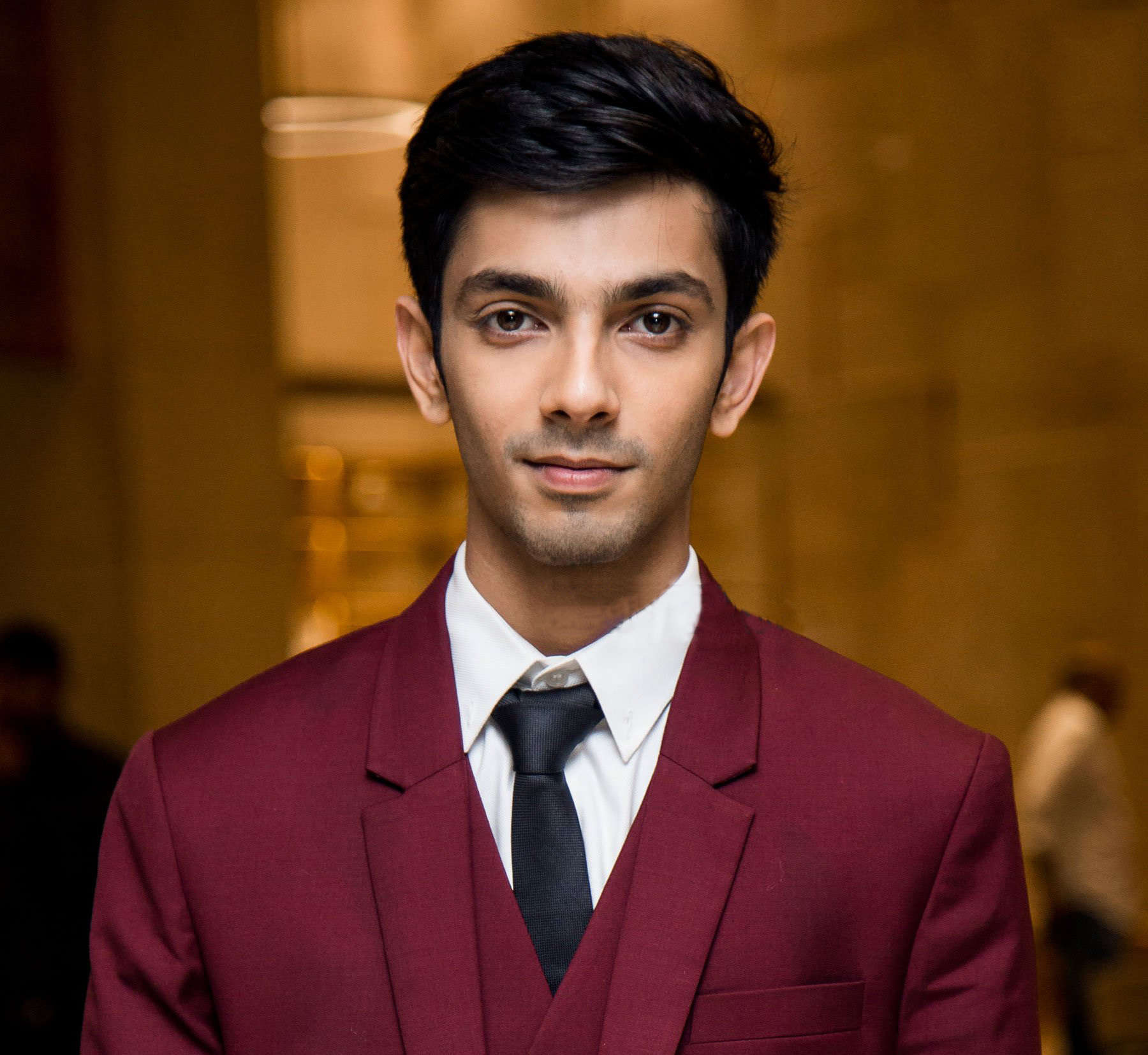
- Anirudh in 2017

Background information
- Born: 16 October 1990 (age 36); Chennai, Tamil Nadu, India
- Education: Trinity Laban (Piano)
- Genres: Film score; independent music
- Occupations: Composer; Playback singer; Instrumentalist; Music producer
- Instruments: Vocals; keyboards
- Years active: 2012–present
- Labels: Sony Music India; Aditya; T-Series; Lahari; Wunderbar; Eros; Divo; Zee; Sun Pictures
- Spouse: Kaviya Maran (m. 2026)

Anirudh Ravichander (born 16 October 1990), also credited mononymously as Anirudh, is an Indian composer and playback singer who works primarily in Tamil cinema, in addition to a few Telugu and Hindi films. He has won two Filmfare Awards South, ten SIIMA Awards, six Edison Awards and five Vijay awards.

His debut song "Why This Kolaveri Di", composed for the 2012 film 3, went viral across the globe and has achieved over 590 million views on YouTube. A.R. Murugadoss signed him to compose music for Kaththi (2014) starring Vijay & Samantha which included the viral hit "Selfie Pulla". The soundtrack for the film became Anirudh's highest profile soundtrack until he was signed to compose music for Rajinikanth's Petta in 2019.

In 2016, he signed a record deal with Sony Music, which publishes his independent albums and live concerts. In the same year, he featured with Diplo on the remix of Major Lazer's hit single "Cold Water".

== Early life and education ==
Anirudh Ravichander was born in a Tamil family to actor Ravi Raghavendra and classical dancer Lakshmi Ravichander in Chennai, Tamil Nadu, India. He has an elder sister. He is the nephew of Latha Rajinikanth and Sudha Mahendra thus making Aishwarya, Soundarya, Hrishikesh and Madhuvanthi his cousins. Through the same relationships, Rajinikanth and Y. G. Mahendran are his uncles. Anirudh's great-grandfather was the director K. Subramanyam, a filmmaker in the 1930s, and his grandfather was S. V. Ramanan, an Indian radio, film, television personality and musician. Anirudh is also the grand-nephew of Padma Vibhushan Dr. Padma Subrahmanyam.

He graduated from the Loyola College in Chennai in 2011, which, according to him, was a backup in case his music career did not take off. Anirudh learnt piano from Trinity College of Music, London. He was also part of a fusion band. Anirudh has also pursued a diploma in sound engineering from Soundtech Media Audio Engineering Institute in Chennai. In his school days, Anirudh and his band had participated in a reality television show judged by the famous musician A. R. Rahman, and his band was one of the winners along with five other bands in the show.

== Personal life ==
Anirudh married Kaviya Maran on 11 November 2026, in Greece.

== Career ==
=== 2011–2012: Debut and early success ===
Anirudh made his debut as a music composer in his cousin Aishwarya Rajinikanth's directorial debut 3, starring Dhanush. While pursuing his degree at Loyola College, he had composed the scores for short films directed by Aishwarya and his work on short films convinced her to have him work on her first commercial venture. In early November 2011, a leaked version of a song from the film Why This Kolaveri Di!, circulated online and the film's team decided to subsequently release it officially. It instantly became popular on social networking sites for its quirky Tanglish lyrics. Soon, the song became the most searched YouTube video in India and internet phenomenon across Asia. The song revolves around the film's main actor being dumped by his girlfriend; the song is sung by the character in a drunken state, with many of the lines nonsensical. According to the composer, 3's director Aishwarya Rajinikanth wanted a light-hearted song about failed love. Anirudh quickly composed the tune in about 10 minutes.

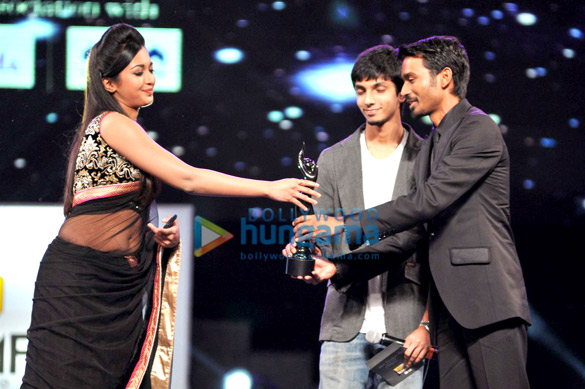
Catherine Tresa, Anirudh Ravichander and Dhanush at 60th Filmfare Awards South in 2013

The remaining songs of the album were released in December and also received largely positive reviews from critics. A reviewer from Behindwoods noted, "Such a promising debut by a composer hasn't been seen in recent Tamil cinema history", while Rediff.com's reviewer noted that "all the songs in 3 are good and come with appealing instrumental arrangements", concluding that it was "an intriguing collection." Anirudh also received praise for his background score in the film. He consequently went on to gain recognition for the film through accolades, notably the Vijay Award for Best Find of the Year as well as nominations at the South Indian International Movie Awards and the 60th Filmfare Awards South. He also worked on the Telugu dubbed version of the film. Anirudh teamed up with Dhanush soon after to produce a Kolaveri-inspired track titled "Sachin anthem" commemorating Sachin Tendulkar in association with the health drink, Boost.

=== 2013–2015: Continued success ===
Next, he sang and composed a single for David – a multi-starrer directed by Bejoy Nambiar; "Kanave Kanave" in Tamil and "Yu Hi Re" in Hindi. The album also opened to very positive reviews, with a critic noting: Anirudh's song was "the pick of the album". His next album was Ethir Neechal, starring Sivakarthikeyan. Anirudh introduced rappers Yo Yo Honey Singh and Hiphop Tamizha in the album. Moreover, Sony Music India released the complete background score of Ethir Neechal via YouTube owing to its popularity. His next soundtrack, Vanakkam Chennai released in July 2013. For the song "Oh Penne", he roped in Vishal Dadlani for the first time in Tamil music. Another promotional song, "Chennai City Gangster", saw him collaborate again with Hiphop Tamizha and British Indian rapper Hard Kaur, with the trio also featuring in a music video for the film. In September 2013, he was signed on to compose the background score for Selvaraghavan's fantasy film Irandam Ulagam after Harris Jayaraj had opted out. Anirudh noted his happiness at working with Selvaraghavan early in his career, despite being called up as a replacement and subsequently recorded for the film in Budapest.

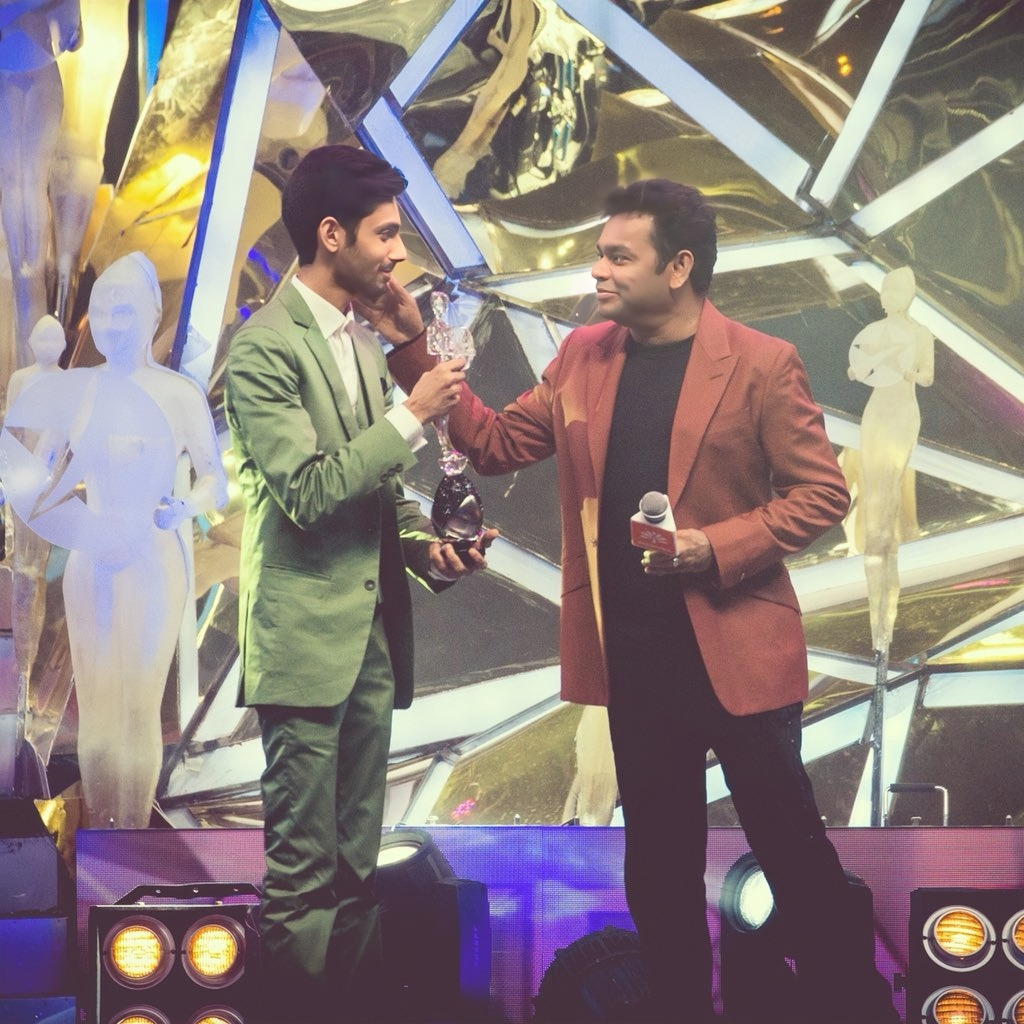
Anirudh Ravichander receiving an award from A. R. Rahman at the 1st Behindwoods Gold Medals ceremony (15 June 2014).

On 15 June 2014, Anirudh Ravichander attended the inaugural Behindwoods Gold Medals ceremony held at the ITC Grand Chola in Chennai. During the event, he was presented with the Behindwoods Gold Medal for Best Music Direction for his work on the soundtracks of Ethir Neechal (2013) and Vanakkam Chennai (2013). The award was presented to him on stage by composer A. R. Rahman. Accepting the honour, Anirudh noted that receiving the award from Rahman—whom he cited as his childhood hero—was a significant personal milestone.

Anirudh's next release Velaiyilla Pattathari, featured a song by veteran singer S. Janaki. while adding "in all, the album is soulful, lively and truly Anirudh". The film subsequently became a blockbuster at the box office, with Anirudh receiving the Filmfare award for best music director. His next film was Maan Karate, starring Sivakarthikeyan. A. R. Murugadoss then signed him on to compose music for Kaththi, starring Vijay, becoming Anirudh's highest profile album at the time. The album and especially the background score received positive reviews from critics and topped the iTunes India Charts.

Next, Anirudh again collaborated with Sivakarthikeyan for the film Kaaki Sattai, produced by Dhanush under his production company. Then, Anirudh scored music for Maari, with Dhanush. The music received positive reviews, with the song "Don'u Don'u Don'u" becoming exceptionally popular. He also received critical acclaim for his work in the Vijay Sethupathi starrer Naanum Rowdy Dhaan, leading him to receive many accolades for his achievement in the film. He released a single from the movie Aakko on Valentine's Day in 2015 of the name "Ennakenna Yaarum Illaiye". He also scored his first Ajith Kumar film in Vedalam, directed by Siva. Anirudh's music received mixed reviews, however, the song "Aaluma Doluma", became a hit. Anirudh concluded the year with Thangamagan, starring Dhanush. In February 2016, for Valentine's Day, he released a single titled "Avalukena", under Sony Music. After a short break, Anirudh released a single from Rum in April 2016; "Hola Amigo". In May 2016, Anirudh signed a deal with Sony Music India for his independent albums and live concerts.

Anirudh again teamed up with Sivakarthikeyan For Remo in late 2017, for the film Vivegam, Anirudh launched the first single "Surviva" and became fastest Tamil song to get 1 million streams, this track saw Yogi B performing in a Tamil film after a long hiatus. He again teamed up with Sivakarthikeyan for the fifth time with Velaikkaaran, for which he won a Filmfare Award for Best Music Director. A Hindi pop music video Bewajah, composed and sung by Anirudh, Irene and Srinidhi Venkatesh was released by Sony Music India. The song became an instant hit etching several million views.

=== 2018–present: Recognition and work in other languages ===
In 2018, he made his Telugu debut with Agnyaathavaasi which was received well. Next, he composed for Suriya's Thaanaa Serndha Koottam, a remake of Special 26. After that, he composed for Nayanthara's Kolamavu Kokila, which was well received and was praised for being unique.

His next big project came with Petta, directed by Karthik Subbaraj and starring his uncle Rajinikanth. On 10 December, the full album for Rajinikanth's Petta was released by Anirudh. His next project was Nani's Telugu film Jersey, which is directed by Gowtam Tinnanuri. He later composed for Gang Leader which was directed by Vikram K Kumar. This marked his second collaboration with Nani. After that was Darbar, directed by A. R. Murugadoss. He then composed one of the songs of the soundtrack for Dharala Prabhu, the title track, which garnered success.

In 2021, he collaborated with Vijay for the 2nd time in Master, directed by Lokesh Kanagaraj. The first single, "Kutti Story", sung by Vijay himself, received great praise and became popular around the world for its Tanglish lyrics. The second single sung by Gana Balachander, "Vaathi Coming", became an instant viral hit universally. He also came to work on the soundtrack of Doctor, directed by Nelson Dilipkumar. The first single "Chellamma" was promoted towards youth, and collected over 100 million views on YouTube. In 2022, he worked with Vijay for the 3rd time in Beast directed by Nelson, whom he also worked with for the 3rd consecutive time. The first single "Arabic Kuthu", was a fusion featuring Arabic phrases and rhyming verses in Tamil. The song set the record for the most-viewed and liked South Indian song within 24 hours, and is currently his most-viewed single with over 700 million views.

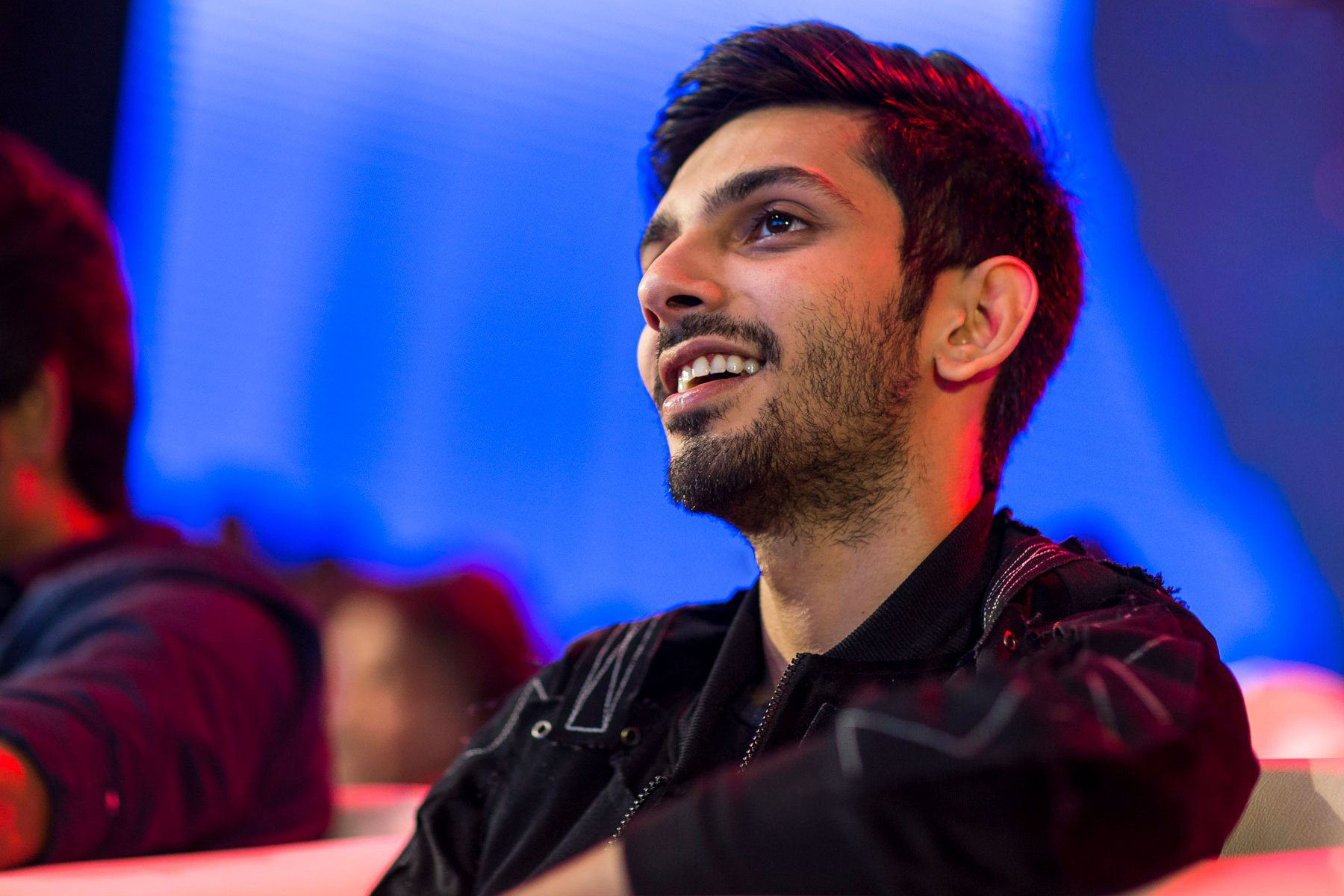
Anirudh at Velaikkaran Audio Launch

His work in Vikram marked his first release with Kamal Haasan, although the duo first collaborated on Indian 2 (released in 2024). The first single of Vikram titled "Pathala Pathala" received several million views from fans. He also composed for Sivakarthikeyan's Don and Vijay Sethupathi's Kaathuvaakula Rendu Kaadhal. After a hiatus, he returned to compose for Dhanush with Thiruchitrambalam. The first single of Thiruchitrambalam titled "Thaai Kelavi" was released on 24 June 2022 and its lyrics proved controversial. A social activist lodged a complaint against the makers of the film asking them to change the lyrics of the song, citing disrespect to elderly people.

After A. R. Rahman turned down an offer by Atlee to compose for his Hindi film Jawan with Shah Rukh Khan, Anirudh was chosen to compose for the film. An announcement teaser featuring Anirudh's score was released in June 2022. Jawan marks the first full-fledged debut for Anirudh in Hindi cinema as a composer as his previous Hindi films David and Jersey featured just a single and reused film from the original, respectively. He then composed the soundtrack for Leo, in his fourth collaboration with Vijay after Kaththi (2014), Master and Beast; and third collaboration with Lokesh after Master and Vikram (2022). The track "Bloody Sweet" that was featured in the two-minute promo video for the movie was released on 3 February 2023, the same date as the promo. It has gathered 83 million views so far on YouTube, his highest. He also composed music for Rajinikanth’s 169th film, titled Jailer and directed by Nelson.

The film marks Anirudh's third collaboration with Rajini after Petta and Darbar and fourth with Nelson after Kolamaavu Kokila, Doctor and Beast.

In 2024, he composed music for N. T. Rama Rao Jr.'s Telugu film Devara, which is directed by Koratala Siva. He has collaborated with Ajith Kumar for his 62nd film Vidaamuyarchi directed by Magizh Thirumeni which marked his third collaboration with Ajith after Vedalam and Vivegam.

The soundtrack of The Ba***ds of Bollywood was composed by Anirudh, working with Aryan Khan, son of Shah Rukh Khan, for the first time; this would also mark his debut as a composer in a television series. The music rights were taken by T-Series.

== Music style and influences ==
Anirudh musical style is recognised for blending contemporary Western genres with traditional Indian classical elements, incorporating both Carnatic music and Hindustani classical music into film soundtracks and background scores. His transition toward exploring more traditional and raga-based compositions received encouragement from composer A. R. Rahman. During the audio launch of Kadhalikka Neramillai in January 2025, Rahman publicly advised Ravichander to integrate classical and traditional Indian music more deeply into his upcoming projects. Rahman highlighted that embracing classical roots would ensure greater artistic longevity, help preserve traditional heritage, and introduce younger audiences to Indian classical art forms.

In February 2026, Anirudh launched his own record label, Albuquerque Records.

== Filmography ==
=== Music videos ===
Year	Song	Language(s)	Artist	Director	Notes	Ref.
2012	"Why This Kolaveri Di "	Tamil	Dhanush	Aishwarya Rajinikanth	Song for 3, appeared alongside the film's lead actors Dhanush and Shruti Haasan.	
2012	"Tata Nano"	Hindi	Dhanush, Blaaze	Vetrimaaran	Promotional Music Video for Tata Nano.	
2012	"Sachin Anthem"	Tamil	Dhanush	Dhanush	Promotional tribute video for cricketing icon Sachin Tendulkar, described as a "humble attempt from a simple fan," made in association with the health drink brand Boost.	
2013	Ethir Neechal	Tamil	Anirudh Ravichander, Yo Yo Honey Singh, Hiphop Tamizha	R. S. Durai Senthilkumar	Making video of Ethir Neechal, appeared alongside the film's lead actors and song artists.	
2013	"Chennai City Gangsta"	Tamil	Hiphop Tamizha, Hard Kaur, Country Chicken	Kiruthiga Udhayanidhi	Promotional video for film Vanakkam Chennai.	
2013	"Vanakkam Chennai Mashup"	Tamil	with Papon, Vishal Dadlani, Pragathi, Andrea Jeremiah, Suchitra, Arjun, Hard Kaur, Hiphop Tamizha	Kiruthiga Udhayanidhi	Promotional Mashup video for film Vanakkam Chennai. *Remixed by Vivek Siva	
2015	"Maari Thara Local"	Tamil	Dhanush, Anirudh Ravichander	Balaji Mohan	Featured and Performed in the Song for Maari	
2016	"Sirikkadhey"	Tamil	Anirudh Ravichander, Arjun Kanungo, Srinidhi Venkatesh	Bakkiyaraj Kannan	Promotional video for film Remo.	
2017	"Iraiva"	Tamil	Anirudh Ravichander, Jonita Gandhi	Mohan Raja	Promotional video for film Velaikkaran.	
2017	"Gaali Vaaluga"	Telugu	Anirudh Ravichander	Trivikram Srinivas	Tribute to Pawan Kalyan; Promotional video for film Agnyaathavaasi.	
2018	"Gun In Kadhal"	Tamil	Vijay Yesudas	Nelson Dilipkumar	Promotional video for Kolamaavu Kokila, appeared alongside the film's lead actress Nayanthara.	
2018	"Orey Oru"	Tamil	Anirudh Ravichander, Jonita Gandhi	Nelson Dilipkumar	Lyrical video of "Orey Oru" from Kolamaavu Kokila.	
2018	"Thittam Poda Theriyala"	Tamil	Anirudh Ravichander	Nelson Dilipkumar	Promotional video for Kolamaavu Kokila.	
2018	"The Karma Theme"	Tamil; Telugu	Anirudh Ravichander	Pawan Kumar	Sung the song "The Karma Theme" from U Turn (2018) and appeared in the promotional video song alongside the film's lead actress Samantha.	
2019	"Gang-u Leader"	Telugu	Nani, Anirudh Ravichander	Vikram Kumar	Promotional video for "Gang-u Leader" song from Nani's Gang Leader (2019), appeared alongside the film's lead actor Nani.	
2020	"Vaathi Coming"	Tamil	Anirudh Ravichander, Gana Balachandar	Lokesh Kanagaraj	Lyrical video of "Vaathi Coming" for Master	
2020	"Chellamma"	Tamil	Anirudh Ravichander, Jonita Gandhi	Nelson Dilipkumar	Lyrical video of "Chellamma" for Doctor	
2021	"Rendu Kaadhal"	Tamil	Anirudh Ravichander, Shakthisree Gopalan, Aishwarya Suresh Bindra	Vignesh Shivan	Songs for Kaathu Vaakula Rendu Kaadhal.	
2021	"Two Two Two"	Tamil	Sanjana Kalmanje, Sunidhi Chauhan, Anirudh Ravichander	Vignesh Shivan	Songs for Kaathu Vaakula Rendu Kaadhal.	
2022	"Dosti"	Telugu	M. M. Keeravani, Hemachandra	S. S. Rajamouli	Promotional video for "Dosti", "Natpu", and "Priyam" from RRR along with Vijay Yesudas, Amit Trivedi, Hemachandra, Yazin Nizar	
2022	"Arabic Kuthu"	Tamil	Anirudh Ravichander, Jonita Gandhi	Nelson Dilipkumar	Lyrical video of "Arabic Kuthu" for Beast	
2022	"Jolly O Gymkhana"	Tamil	Vijay, Anirudh Ravichander	Nelson Dilipkumar	Video Song of "Jolly O Gymkhana" for Beast	
2022	"Dippam Dappam"	Tamil	Anirudh Ravichander, Anthony Daasan	Vignesh Shivan	Lyrical video for Kaathuvaakula Rendu Kaadhal	
2022	"Private Party"	Tamil	Anirudh Ravichander, Jonita Gandhi	Cibi Chakravathy	Lyrical video of "Private Party" for Don	
2023	"Chilla Chilla"	Tamil	Anirudh Ravichander, Ghibran and Vaisagh	H. Vinoth	Lyrical video of "Chilla Chilla" for Thunivu	
2023	"Naa Ready"	Tamil	Vijay, Anirudh Ravichander and Asal Kolaru	Lokesh Kanagaraj	Lyrical video of "Naa Ready" for Leo	
2023	"Hukum"	Tamil	Anirudh Ravichander, Chorus Dialogues – Rajinikanth	Nelson Dilipkumar	Lyrical video of "Hukum" for Jailer	
2023	"Adiyaathi"	Tamil	Anirudh Ravichander, Yuvan Shankar Raja	C. Aravind Raja	Music video of "Adiyaathi" for Paramporul	
2023	"Badass"	Tamil	Anirudh Ravichander.	Lokesh Kanagaraj	Lyrical video of "Badass" for Leo	
2024	"Fear Song"	Telugu	Anirudh Ravichander	Koratala Siva	Music video of "Fear Song" for Devara	
2024	"Manasilaayo"	Tamil	Anirudh Ravichander, Malaysia Vasudevan (By using AI Voice modelling Technology), Yugendran Vasudevan, Deepthi Suresh	T. J. Gnanavel	Featured and Performed in the Song for Vettaiyan	
2024	"Dheema"	Tamil	Anirudh Ravichander	Vignesh Shivan	Music video of "Dheema" for Love Insurance Kompany	
2025	"Sawadeeka"	Tamil	Anirudh Ravichander, Anthony Daasan	Magizh Thirumeni	Lyrical video of "Sawadeeka" for Vidaamuyarchi	
2025	"Chikitu"	Tamil	T. Rajendar, Arivu, Anirudh Ravichander	Lokesh Kanagaraj	Music video of "Chikitu" for Coolie	
2026	"Thalapathy Kacheri"	Tamil	Vijay, Anirudh Ravichander, Arivu	H. Vinoth	Music video of "Thalapathy Kacheri" for Jana Nayagan	
2026	"Aravindh"	Tamil; Telugu	Anirudh Ravichander	Anirudh Ravichander	Music video dedicated to his friend Aravinth Baskaran	

=== Films ===
Year	Title	Role	Notes
2013	Ethir Neechal	Bar waiter	Cameo appearance
2014	Maan Karate	Himself	Special appearance in the song "Open the Tasmac"
2015	Maari	Himself	Special appearance in the song "Maari Thara Local"
2024	Vettaiyan	Himself	Special appearance in the song "Manasilaayo"
2026	Love Insurance Kompany	Bro 9000	Voice role

== Awards and nominations ==
Anirudh Ravichander awards and nominations
Awards and nominations
Award	Wins	Nominations

Totals (Note: Certain award groups do not simply award one winner. They acknowledge several different recipients, have runners-up, and have third place. Since this is a specific recognition and is different from losing an award, runner-up mentions are considered wins in this award tally. For simplification and to avoid errors, each award in this list has been presumed to have had a prior nomination.)
- Wins: 35
- Nominations: 52

Year	Award	Category	Work	Result
2012	60th Filmfare Awards South	Best Male Playback Singer – Tamil	3	Nominated
2012	Vijay Awards	Favourite Song	3	Nominated
2012	Vijay Awards	Best Find of the Year	3	Won
2012	Vijay Awards	Best Music Director	3	Nominated
2012	2nd South Indian International Movie Awards	Best Music Director – Tamil	3	Nominated
2012	2nd South Indian International Movie Awards	Sensational Music Director	3	Won
2012	Edison Awards	Best Music Director	3	Won
2013	Edison Awards	Best Music Director	Vanakkam Chennai	Won
2013	61st Filmfare Awards South	Best Music Director – Tamil	Vanakkam Chennai	Nominated
2013	61st Filmfare Awards South	Best Music Director – Tamil	Ethir Neechal	Nominated
2013	Vijay Awards	Favourite Song	Ethir Neechal	Nominated
2013	Vijay Awards	Best Song	Ethir Neechal	Won
2013	Vijay Awards	Best Music Director	Ethir Neechal	Nominated
2013	3rd South Indian International Movie Awards	Best Music Director – Tamil	Ethir Neechal	Won
2013	3rd South Indian International Movie Awards	Best Male Playback Singer – Tamil	Ethir Neechal	Nominated
2013	Behindwoods Gold Medal	Best Music Director	Vanakkam Chennai, Ethirneechal	Won
2014	Edison Awards	Best Music Director	Kaththi	Won
2014	62nd Filmfare Awards South	Best Music Director – Tamil	Kaththi	Nominated
2014	62nd Filmfare Awards South	Best Music Director – Tamil	Maan Karate	Nominated
2014	62nd Filmfare Awards South	Best Music Director – Tamil	Velaiyilla Pattathari	Won
2014	Vijay Awards	Best Music Director	Velaiyilla Pattathari	Won
2014	Vijay Awards	Best Background Score	Velaiyilla Pattathari	Nominated
2014	Vijay Awards	Favourite Song	Velaiyilla Pattathari	Won
2014	4th South Indian International Movie Awards	Best Music Director – Tamil	Velaiyilla Pattathari	Won
2014	4th South Indian International Movie Awards	Most Streamed Song – Tamil	Kaththi	Won
2014	1st IIFA Utsavam	Best Music Director – Tamil	Kaththi	Won
2015	5th South Indian International Movie Awards	Best Music Director – Tamil	Naanum Rowdy Dhaan	Won
2015	5th South Indian International Movie Awards	Best Male Playback Singer – Tamil	Naanum Rowdy Dhaan	Won
2015	Edison Awards	Best Background Score	Vedalam	Won
2015	2nd IIFA Utsavam	Best Male Playback Singer – Tamil	Naanum Rowdy Dhaan	Won
2016	Edison Awards	Best Music Director	Remo	Won
2016	64th Filmfare Awards South	Best Music Director – Tamil	Remo	Nominated
2016	64th Filmfare Awards South	Best Male Playback Singer – Tamil	Remo	Nominated
2016	6th South Indian International Movie Awards	Best Male Playback Singer – Tamil	Remo	Won
2016	6th South Indian International Movie Awards	Best Music Director – Tamil	Remo	Nominated
2017	Ananda Vikatan Cinema Awards	Best Playback Singer Male	"Karuthavanlaam Galeejam" from Velaikkaran "Yaanji Yaanji" from Vikram Vedha	Won
2017	65th Filmfare Awards South	Best Male Playback Singer – Tamil	"Yaanji Yaanji" from Vikram Vedha	Won
2017	Edison Awards	Best Music Director	Velaikaran	Won
2018	Vijay Awards	Best Male Playback Singer	"Iraivaa" from Velaikkaran	Won
2019	8th South Indian International Movie Awards	Best Male Playback Singer – Tamil	"Kalyana Vayasu" from Kolamavu Kokila	Nominated
2019	8th South Indian International Movie Awards	Best Music Director – Tamil	Kolamavu Kokila	Won
2020	Zee Cine Awards Tamil	Best Music Director	Petta	Won
2020	Mirchi Music Awards South	Listeners Choice Album – Tamil	Petta	Won
2020	Mirchi Music Awards South	Viral Song of the Year – Tamil	"Marana Mass" from Petta	Won
2020	Mirchi Music Awards South	Album of the Year – Telugu	Gang Leader	Won
2021	9th South Indian International Movie Awards	Best Music Director	Petta	Nominated
2021	9th South Indian International Movie Awards	Best Best Male Playback Singer – Tamil	Ispade Rajavum Idhaya Raniyum	Nominated
2021	9th South Indian International Movie Awards	Best Music Director	Jersey	Nominated
2021	10th South Indian International Movie Awards	Best Male Playback Singer – Tamil	Dharala Prabhu	Nominated
2021	10th South Indian International Movie Awards	Best Male Playback Singer – Tamil	Doctor	Nominated
2021	10th South Indian International Movie Awards	Best Music Director – Tamil	Master	Nominated
2021	Ananda Vikatan Cinema Awards	Best Music Director	Doctor	Won
2021	Ananda Vikatan Cinema Awards	Best Music Director	Master	Won
2023	11th South Indian International Movie Awards	Best Male Playback Singer – Tamil	"Arabic Kuthu" from Beast	Nominated
2023	11th South Indian International Movie Awards	Best Music Director – Tamil	Vikram	Won
2023	Edison Awards	Best Music Director	Beast	Nominated
2024	69th Filmfare Awards	Best Music Director	Jawan	Nominated
2024	Ishq Music Awards	Best Music Composer	Jawan	Won
2024	Ishq Music Awards	Best Romantic Hit	"Chaleya" from Jawan	Won
2024	Zee Cine Awards	Best Music Director	Jawan	Won
2024	Zee Cine Awards	Best Background Score	Jawan	Won
2024	Filmfare Awards South	Best Music Director – Tamil	Jailer	Nominated
2024	Filmfare Awards South	Best Music Director – Tamil	Leo	Nominated
2024	Filmfare Awards South	Best Male Playback Singer – Tamil	"Hukum" from Jailer	Nominated
2024	Filmfare Awards South	Best Male Playback Singer – Tamil	"Badass" from Leo	Nominated
2024	12th South Indian International Movie Awards	Best Music Director – Tamil	Jailer and Leo	Won
2024	12th South Indian International Movie Awards	Best Male Playback Singer – Tamil	"Badass" from Leo	Nominated
2025	Kalaimamani	Tamil Nadu State Government Award	Contribution to the Tamil film industry	Won

=== Other honours ===
Year	Award
2012	Mirchi Music Awards for Royal Stag Make It Large Award
2016	Mirchi Music Awards Tamil for the best Music composer, Song of the Year, Album of the year for Naanum Rowdy Dhaan
