= Statistics of the COVID-19 pandemic in Tamil Nadu =

== Statistics ==
=== Total confirmed cases, active cases, recoveries and deaths ===
View chart definition.

=== Confirmed cases by districts ===
>100,000
View chart definition.
>10,000 and <100,000
View chart definition.
>5,000 and <10,000
View chart definition.

=== Case completion percentage ===
View chart definition.

=== Daily new cases ===
View chart definition.

=== Daily new recovered ===
View source data.

=== Daily new deaths ===
View chart definition.

Note: On 22 July, 444 previous deaths were added to Chennai district after reconciliation; which are not included in the chart.

=== Daily new cases by type of spread ===
View source data.

=== Positive sampling rate ===
View chart definition.

=== Case fatality rate ===
The trend of case fatality rate for COVID-19 from 25 March, the day first death in the state was recorded.

View chart definition.

=== Total samples tested ===
View chart definition.

=== Daily new samples tested ===
View chart definition.

=== Plot of new samples tested per day vs new confirmed positive per day ===
View source data.
