= Sun Pictures =

Indian film production and distribution company

- Type: Subsidiary of Sun Network
- Founded: 2008; 18 years ago
- Headquarters: Murasoli Maran Towers, Chennai, Tamil Nadu, India
- Key people: Kalanithi Maran (Owner, Founder and Chairman of the Sun Group); Sembian Sivakumar (COO)
- Products: Distribution; Production; Music
- Services: Film production and distribution; Digital distribution; Licensing
- Parent: Sun TV Network
- Website: www.sunpictures.in

Sun Pictures is an Indian film production and distribution company based in Chennai, India. It is a division of Sun TV Network, a part of the Sun Group. Sun Pictures started producing films in 2010, the first being Enthiran, which was a huge blockbuster. Since then, the company has produced the blockbusters Sarkar (2018), Petta (2019), Kanchana 3 (2019), Thiruchitrambalam (2022), Jailer (2023), Raayan (2024), Coolie (2025), DC (2026), and Jailer 2 (2026).

== History ==
Sun Pictures was established in 2008 as Sun TV Network's film distribution and production studio, with Hansraj Saxena appointed as its chief operating officer. In February 2009 Sun Pictures took over production of Enthiran from Eros International and Ayngaran International, marking its first direct production venture. Starring Rajinikanth and Aishwarya Rai Bachchan, the Tamil science-fiction film was reported at the time to be the most expensive Indian film yet made, with production costs of approximately $32 million.

Between 2008 and 2010 Sun Pictures released close to 20 films. Production and distribution activity subsequently slowed after the AIADMK government came to power in Tamil Nadu.

Sun Pictures and Hansraj Saxena, its chief operating officer at the time, faced nine separate criminal complaints in June 2011 alleging cheating and intimidation. Writing in the Economic and Political Weekly, journalist Paranjoy Guha Thakurta suggested the case filings were connected to a promise the AIADMK had made in its 2011 election manifesto, to break Sun Group's control over cable TV in Tamil Nadu.

In July 2011 chief operating officer Hansraj Saxena was arrested in Chennai on charges of criminal breach of trust and cheating, following a complaint by a film producer alleging non-payment for distribution rights to the film Theeradha Vilaiyattu Pillai (2010). Saxena denied the charges and was remanded to judicial custody pending trial.

Sun Pictures announced its next production in December 2017, an untitled film starring Vijay and directed by A. R. Murugadoss, tentatively referred to as "Vijay 62". This marked the studio's first production since Enthiran in 2010, having concentrated primarily on distribution in the intervening years.

Following Jailer's box-office success, Kalanithi Maran met Rajinikanth in August 2023 and presented him with a cheque and a choice of two luxury cars, from which the actor selected a BMW X7. Maran separately presented director Nelson Dilipkumar with a cheque the following day. On 14 January 2025 Sun Pictures officially announced Jailer 2, a sequel reuniting director Nelson Dilipkumar and composer Anirudh Ravichander with Rajinikanth.

In April 2025, Sun Pictures announced a socio-fantasy film pairing Allu Arjun with director Atlee titled Raaka. It is described by the studio as a visual-effects-heavy production made on a magnanimous scale aiming for a wide global theatrical release.

== Films produced ==
Key
| † | Denotes films that have not yet been released |

| Year | Title | Cast | Director | Languages | Notes |
|---|---|---|---|---|---|
| 2010 | Enthiran | Rajinikanth, Aishwarya Rai Bachchan, Danny Denzongpa, Santhanam | Shankar | Tamil | Tamil film production debut |
| 2018 | Sarkar | Vijay, Keerthy Suresh, Varalaxmi Sarathkumar, Radha Ravi | A. R. Murugadoss | Tamil | |
| 2019 | Petta | Rajinikanth, Vijay Sethupathi, Simran, Trisha Krishnan | Karthik Subbaraj | Tamil | |
| 2019 | Kanchana 3 | Raghava Lawrence, Oviya, Vedhika, Kovai Sarala | Raghava Lawrence | Tamil | |
| 2019 | Namma Veettu Pillai | Sivakarthikeyan, Aishwarya Rajesh, Anu Emmanuel, Soori | Pandiraj | Tamil | |
| 2021 | Annaatthe | Rajinikanth, Keerthy Suresh, Nayanthara, Prakash Raj | Siva | Tamil | |
| 2022 | Etharkkum Thunindhavan | Suriya, Priyanka Mohan, Vinay Rai, Sathyaraj | Pandiraj | Tamil | |
| 2022 | Beast | Vijay, Pooja Hegde, Selvaraghavan, VTV Ganesh | Nelson Dilipkumar | Tamil | |
| 2022 | Thiruchitrambalam | Dhanush, Nithya Menen, Raashii Khanna, Priya Bhavani Shankar | Mithran Jawahar | Tamil | |
| 2023 | Jailer | Rajinikanth, Vinayakan, Ramya Krishnan, Vasanth Ravi, Mirnaa, Mohanlal, Shiva Rajkumar | Nelson Dilipkumar | Tamil | |
| 2024 | Raayan | Dhanush, S. J. Suryah, Sundeep Kishan | Dhanush | Tamil | National Film Award for Best Tamil Film |
| 2025 | Coolie | Rajinikanth, Nagarjuna, Upendra, Soubin Shahir, Sathyaraj, Shruthi Haasan | Lokesh Kanagaraj | Tamil | |
| 2026 | DC | Lokesh Kanagaraj, Wamiqa Gabbi | Arun Matheswaran | Tamil | |
| 2026 | Jailer 2 | Rajinikanth, S. J. Suryah, Ramya Krishnan, Mirnaa, Mithun Chakraborty | Nelson Dilipkumar | Tamil | |
| 2028 | Raaka † | Allu Arjun, Deepika Padukone, | Atlee | Telugu & English | Telugu film & English production debut |

== Distributed films ==
As distributor
| Year | Film | Cast | Director | Notes |
|---|---|---|---|---|
| 2008 | Kadhalil Vizhunthen | Nakul, Sunaina, Sampath Raj, Livingston | P. Prasad | |
| 2008 | Thenavattu | Jiiva, Poonam Bajwa, Ganja Karuppu, Ravi Kale | Kathir | |
| 2008 | Dindigul Sarathy | Karunas, Karthika, Saranya Ponvannan, Nassar | Siva Sanmukam | |
| 2009 | Padikathavan | Dhanush, Tamannaah Bhatia, Vivek, Atul Kulkarni | Suraj | |
| 2009 | Thee | Sundar C, Namitha, Ramya Raj, Vivek | Kicha | |
| 2009 | Ayan | Suriya, Prabhu, Tamannaah Bhatia, Akashdeep Saighal | K. V. Anand | |
| 2009 | Maasilamani | Nakul, Sunaina, Pawan, Santhanam | R. N. R. Manohar | |
| 2009 | Ninaithale Inikkum | Prithviraj Sukumaran, Shakthi Vasu, Karthik Kumar, Priyamani | G. N. R. Kumaravelan | |
| 2009 | Kanden Kadhalai | Bharath, Tamannaah Bhatia, Santhanam, Sapan Saran | R. Kannan | |
| 2009 | Vettaikaaran | Vijay, Anushka Shetty, Sanchita Padukone, Sathyan | B. BabuSivan | |
| 2010 | Theeradha Vilaiyattu Pillai | Vishal, Sarah-Jane Dias, Tanushree Dutta, Neetu Chandra | Thiru | |
| 2010 | Sura | Vijay, Tamannaah Bhatia, Dev Gill, Vadivelu | S. P. Rajkumar | |
| 2010 | Singam | Suriya, Anushka Shetty, Prakash Raj, Vivek | Hari | |
| 2010 | Thillalangadi | Jayam Ravi, Tamannaah Bhatia, Shaam, Prabhu | Mohan Raja | |
| 2010 | Enthiran | Rajinikanth, Aishwarya Rai Bachchan, Danny Denzongpa, Santhanam | S. Shankar | |
| 2011 | Aadukalam | Dhanush, Tapsee Pannu, Kishore, V. I. S. Jayapalan | Vetrimaran | |
| 2011 | Mappillai | Dhanush, Hansika Motwani, Manisha Koirala, Vivek | Suraj | |
| 2011 | Engeyum Kaadhal | Jayam Ravi, Hansika Motwani, Suman, Raju Sundaram | Prabhu Deva | |
| 2011 | Mankatha | Ajith Kumar, Arjun Sarja, Trisha Krishnan, Lakshmi Rai | Venkat Prabhu | |
| 2011 | Vedi | Vishal, Sameera Reddy, Poonam Kaur, Vivek | Prabhu Deva | |
| 2013 | Kutti Puli | Sasikumar, Lakshmi Menon, Saranya Ponvannan, Bala Saravanan | M. Muthaiya | |
| 2014 | Inga Enna Solluthu | VTV Ganesh, Meera Jasmine, Santhanam, Pandiarajan | Vincent Selva | |
| 2015 | Muni 3: Kanchana 2 | Raghava Lawrence, Taapsee Pannu, Nithya Menen, Kovai Sarala | Raghava Lawrence | |
| 2018 | Sarkar | Vijay, Keerthy Suresh, Varalaxmi Sarathkumar, Radha Ravi | AR Murugadoss | |
| 2019 | Petta | Rajinikanth, Vijay Sethupathi, Simran, Trisha Krishnan | Karthik Subbaraj | |
| 2019 | Kanchana 3 | Raghava Lawrence, Oviya, Vedhika, Nikki Tamboli | Raghava Lawrence | |
| 2019 | Namma Veettu Pillai | Sivakarthikeyan, Aishwarya Rajesh, Anu Emmanuel, Soori | Pandiraj | |
| 2021 | Annaatthe | Rajinikanth, Keerthy Suresh, Nayanthara, Khushbu | Siva | |
| 2022 | Etharkkum Thunindhavan | Suriya, Vinay Rai, Priyanka Mohan, Sathyaraj | Pandiraj | |
| 2022 | Beast | Vijay, Pooja Hegde, Selvaraghavan, VTV Ganesh | Nelson Dilipkumar | |

== Sun Pictures Music ==
Film soundtracks released
| Year | Film | Notes |
|---|---|---|
| 2008 | Dindigul Sarathy | Also distributor |
| 2009 | Thee | Also distributor |
| 2019 | Kanchana 3 | Also producer |
| 2019 | Namma Veettu Pillai | Also producer |
| 2021 | Annaatthe | Also producer |
| 2021 | Etharkkum Thunindhavan | Also producer |
| 2022 | Beast | Also producer |
| 2022 | Thiruchitrambalam | Also producer |
| 2023 | Jailer | Also producer |
| 2024 | Raayan | Also producer |
| 2025 | Coolie | Also producer |
| 2026 | DC | Also producer |
| 2026 | Jailer 2 | Also producer |
