= Nelson Dilipkumar =

Indian filmmaker (born 1984)

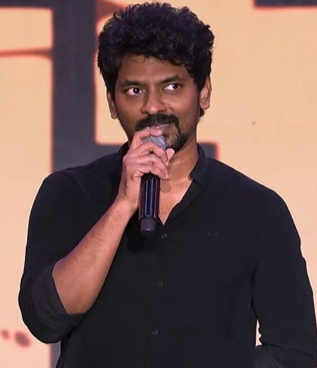
- Nelson at the audio launch for Jailer
- Born: June 21, 1984 (age 42); Vellore, Tamil Nadu, India
- Education: The New College, Chennai
- Occupations: Film director; Screenwriter
- Years active: 2010–present
- Spouse: Monisha
- Children: 1

Nelson Dilipkumar (/nɛlsən ðɪliːpkumɑːr/ born 21 June 1984), also credited mononymously as Nelson, is an Indian director and screenwriter who predominantly works in Tamil cinema. He is known for directing crime and action films which incorporate dark humor.

Nelson started his career in 2010 with the feature film Vettai Mannan. However, it was shelved due to various reasons. He later directed Kolamaavu Kokila (2018), making his debut in the industry. He directed Doctor (2021), which emerged a commercial success during the COVID-19 pandemic. This was followed by Beast (2022), which emerged as one of the highest-grossing Tamil film of 2022. He then worked on Jailer (2023), which became his most successful film; it became one of the highest-grossing Indian films, earning over ₹600 crore (US$64 million) worldwide. His next film, Jailer 2 (2026), broke the worldwide box-office record for Tamil cinema, grossing approximately ₹800 crores and surpassing 2.0 to become the highest-grossing Tamil film of all time.

== Personal life ==
Nelson holds a degree in visual communication from the New College, Chennai. He started his career as an assistant scriptwriter in Star Vijay. Nelson's father died in November 2018. He is married to Monisha and they have one child.

== Film career ==
Nelson started his work on what was originally intended to have been his directorial debut, Vettai Mannan, in 2010. The film would have starred Silambarasan, Jai, Hansika Motwani and Deeksha Seth; would have been produced by NIC Arts's S. S. Chakravarthy; and would have featured music by Yuvan Shankar Raja. However, the film was shelved for unknown reasons halfway through production. There was an attempt to revive the project in 2017 with a new crew, such as Anirudh Ravichander replacing Yuvan Shankar Raja as the composer. However, the project failed to take off again.

Anirudh helped Nelson make his actual debut feature film as writer-director, the dark comedy Kolamaavu Kokila, starring Nayanthara in the lead role. The film, produced by Lyca Productions, released on 17 August 2018 and became a commercial success.

His next film was Doctor, starring Sivakarthikeyan in the lead role opposite Priyanka Arul Mohan. The film became one of the biggest Tamil-language blockbusters among films that released theatrically after the pandemic-induced lockdowns.

In November 2020, Anirudh introduced Nelson to actor Vijay, who was impressed with Nelson's script for Beast. The film, an action comedy and Vijay's 65th film, also starring Pooja Hegde, was released on 13 April 2022 as a pan-Indian film dubbed in the Telugu, Hindi, Kannada and Malayalam languages. Despite getting negative reviews from critics, the film became a box office success.

Nelson's next film was Rajinikanth's 169 film, which was tentatively titled as Thalaivar 169. On 17 June 2022, the title was announced to be Jailer. Rajinikanth played the role of a jailer in the film. It was released on 10 August 2023 to generally positive reviews from both the critics and audience, alike. The performances of the cast (especially Rajinikanth's), direction, music, cinematography, editing, and action sequences were highly praised. Nelson was also praised by Chief Minister M. K. Stalin for his direction. It was deemed as a huge commercial comeback for both Rajinikanth and Nelson, and had a huge opening weekend, becoming the second-highest grossing Tamil film of all-time after 2.0 (2018).

Owing to his films success, he confirmed Kolamaavu Kokila, Doctor, Beast and Jailer would have sequels.

== Filmmaking style ==
Nelson's films contain dark humor because the supporting characters in his films are often singled out for their eccentricity, relying on body language and dialogue delivery to produce humour. Nelson also tends to use double act comedy extensively, such as Bobi and Tony in Kolamaavu Kokila; Mahaali and Kili in Doctor and Beast; and Jack and Jill in Beast. Visually, Nelson's filmography can be identified through steady camera shots, blocked shots and headspace, rarely opting for zoom shots.

Nelson has cited C. V. Sridhar, Steven Spielberg and Quentin Tarantino as his favorite directors. Critics have also noted multiple references of Breaking Bad in his work.

== Filmography ==
Key
†	Denotes films that have not yet been released

=== As a director and writer ===
- Note: He is credited as Nelson in all films.
- Note: All films are in Tamil unless stated otherwise.

Year	Film	Ref.
2018	Kolamaavu Kokila	
2021	Doctor	
2022	Beast	
2023	Jailer	
2026	Jailer 2	

=== As a producer ===
Year	Film	Language	Notes	Ref.
2024	Bloody Beggar	Tamil	Production debut	

=== As an actor ===
Year	Film	Role	Notes	Ref.
2022	Beast	Himself	Cameo appearance in the song "Jolly O Gymkhana"	
2025	Mask	Narrator	Voice role	
2026	Jana Nayagan	Reporter	Cameo appearance	

=== Recurring collaborations ===
Editor R. Nirmal, Anirudh Ravichander and actor Yogi Babu have worked in all of his films. Redin Kingsley, D. R. K. Kiran and Jani Master has worked in four of his films. Sivakarthikeyan has written lyrics for three movies and acted in one movie.

Films	R. Nirmal	Anirudh Ravichander	Yogi Babu	Sivakarthikeyan	Redin Kingsley	D. R. K. Kiran	Sunil Reddy	Jani Master	Bjorn Surrao	Vijay Kartik Kannan	Kalanithi Maran
Kolamaavu Kokila (2018)|	check	check	check	as lyricist	check						
Doctor (2021)	check	check	check	check	check	check	check	check	check	check	
Beast (2022)	check	check	check	as lyricist	check	check	check	check	cameo		check
Jailer (2023)	check	check	check		check	check	check	check		check	check
Jailer 2 (2026)	check	check	check			check		check	check	check	check

== Awards and nominations ==
Year	Film	Award	Category	Result
2019	Kolamaavu Kokila	8th South Indian International Movie Awards	Best Debut Director	Won
2019	Kolamaavu Kokila	Norway Tamil Film Festival Awards	Best Screenplay	Won
2023	Beast	Edison Awards	Best Director	Nominated
2023	Jailer	12th South Indian International Movie Awards	Best Director – Tamil	Won
