= Kolamaavu Kokila =

2018 Indian film by Nelson Dilipkumar

- Theatrical release poster
- Directed by: Nelson Dilipkumar
- Written by: Nelson Dilipkumar
- Produced by: Allirajah Subaskaran
- Starring: Nayanthara
- Cinematography: Sivakumar Vijayan
- Edited by: R. Nirmal
- Music by: Anirudh Ravichander
- Production company: Lyca Productions
- Distributed by: Zee Studios
- Release date: 17 August 2018
- Running time: 135 minutes
- Country: India
- Language: Tamil
- Budget: ₹8 crore
- Box office: ₹73 crore

Kolamaavu Kokila (transl. Kolam-powder Kokila) abbreviated as CoCo, is a 2018 Indian Tamil-language black comedy crime film written and directed by Nelson Dilipkumar, and produced by Allirajah Subaskaran of Lyca Productions. The film stars Nayanthara, alongside Yogi Babu, Saranya Ponvannan, Saravanan, VJ Jacqueline, R. S. Shivaji, Charles Vinoth and Hareesh Peradi. It follows a woman who takes to drug smuggling to fund her mother's cancer treatment, but her entire family is dragged into danger after she goes deeper into the criminal underworld.

The film, the directorial debut of Nelson, was announced in July 2017. Principal photography began the following month, and ended by January 2018. Anirudh Ravichander composed the music, while Sivakumar Vijayan handled the cinematography and R. Nirmal was the editor.

Kolamaavu Kokila was released on 17 August 2018 and became a commercial success, grossing ₹73 crore (equivalent to ₹127 crore or US$13 million in 2026) against a budget of ₹8 crore (equivalent to ₹14 crore or US$1.4 million in 2026). It received four nominations in the Tamil branch at the 66th Filmfare Awards South, including Best Actress (Nayanthara) and Best Supporting Actor (Yogi Babu) with Saranya winning Best Supporting Actress. The film was remade in Hindi as Good Luck Jerry (2022).

== Plot ==
The film opens with the killing of a police officer by a cocaine-dealer named Bhai and his henchmen. Kokila struggles to find a job to take care of her parents and sister. She stumbles on the cocaine smuggling business of Mohan. When her mother is diagnosed with lung cancer, Kokila is forced to work for Mohan. Her cunningness earns her a name in the business. The new inspector Guru is a no-nonsense cop who cracks down on drug dealers. Kokila is almost caught a couple of times but manages to evade the authorities. She convinces Mohan to kill two of his henchmen suspected of leaking information and then decides to quit the business. Mohan seemingly agrees but tries to kill her, however an enraged Kokila brutally murders Mohan and his men and tries to flee with her family but is caught by Bobi, who had recruited her initially. He demands that she deliver one last consignment of 100 kilos to Alphonse. Kokila is forced to accept and enlists the help of her family. Shekhar and Lakshman Kumar join them unaware of their smuggling. She delivers the load, but it is revealed that she switched most of it for salt. She then tricks Bobi to double-cross Bhai and then frames him for swindling Bhai. She has him killed and continues the shipment run. On the way, she is caught by the police, who are Alphonse's men in disguise. She manages to avoid getting tortured and kills off her captors with the help of her family. Guru tracks her down and arrests her. Kokila makes a deal with him to nab Bhai and bring the whole drug business down. The plan works out, Bhai is shot dead by Guru, and Kokila and her family escape punishment with Guru's reluctant help as the latter's wife was tricked into being on the location during the drug bust. Afterwards, the family starts a legitimate business of Kolam powder, calling it 'Kokila kolamaavu'.

== Cast ==
- Nayanthara as Kokila
- Saranya Ponvannan as Kokila's mother
- Saravanan as Inspector Guru
- Yogi Babu as Shekhar
- Rajendran as Alphonse
- Hareesh Peradi as Bhai
- R. S. Shivaji as Kokila's father
- Cheenu Mohan as Police Inspector
- Charles Vinoth as Mohan
- Arun Alexander as Bobi
- Billy Murali as Police Officer
- Anbu Thasan as Lakshman Kumar (LK)
- Aranthangi Nisha as Guru's wife
- Srilekha Parthasarathy
- Vadivel Balaji as Remo Kumar
- Jacquline Lydia as Shobi
- Redin Kingsley as Tony
- Shiva Aravind

Bijili Ramesh, Lollu Sabha Manohar and Theepetti Ganesan make special appearances in the promotional song "Kabiskabaa CoCo". Anirudh Ravichander does so in another promotional song "Gun In Kadhal".

== Production ==
Nelson Dilipkumar announced a project in 2010 titled Vettai Mannan, which was to have been his directorial debut. But the film ran into production trouble and was shelved, despite some filming being completed. Later, on the recommendation of composer Anirudh Ravichander, Lyca Productions hired Nelson to direct a female-oriented film starring Nayanthara, which became his actual directorial debut. In late July 2017, sources from the production house announced that the film would be a black comedy like the actor's earlier film Naanum Rowdy Dhaan (2015). It further added that Nayanthara was impressed with the script and the production house had her dates as the actress relieved off all her other commitments. Sivakumar Vijayan and R. Nirmal were announced as the cinematographer and editor. While the title was initially announced as CoCo, it was revealed to be short for Kolamaavu Kokila. Principal photography began in Chennai in late August 2017, and was completed by early January 2018.

== Soundtrack ==
The film's six-song soundtrack and score is composed by Anirudh Ravichander, in his first collaboration with Nelson Dilipkumar. Lyrics for the songs were written by Vivek, Vignesh Shivan, Arunraja Kamaraj and actor Sivakarthikeyan, in his first stint as lyricist. After three songs — "Edhuvarayo", "Kalyana Vayasu" and "Orey Oru" — were released as singles on 8 March, 15 May and 13 June 2018, the soundtrack was released by Zee Music Company on 5 July 2018.

== Release ==
Kolamaavu Kokila was released theatrically on 17 August 2018. It is the first Tamil film distributed by Zee Studios.

== Reception ==
=== Critical response ===
M. Suganth of The Times of India gave the film 3.5 out of 5 praising the direction and technical aspects and wrote, "The film is an out-and-out star vehicle that keeps giving its star whistle-worthy moments. And most remarkably, it manages to stay true to its genre and ensures that the script comes before the star." Ashameera Aiyappan of The Indian Express gave the film 3 out of 5, praising the performances, writing and technical aspects. Vishal Menon of The Hindu noted the film's similarities to Breaking Bad such as the protagonist's moral decline, "Yet what sets it apart is how the film treats even the darkest situations with humour". He said it is "one of the better films we've seen this year and a departure from the sermons that have come to be defined as feminist films", calling it "quirky, ridiculous and fun". Baradwaj Rangan wrote for Film Companion, "The suspense factor is criminally low and this film could have been so much more, but it's so different in so many ways that I'm just glad it exists". Kirubhakar Purushothaman of India Today wrote, "Kolamaavu Kokila had all the potential of becoming a tear-jerker, but it avoids those cliches like a plague and stays true to the tone of the film — dark and fun. And that's what makes it unmissable".

Priyanka Sundar of Hindustan Times wrote, "Kolamaavu Kokila proves what spectacular writing can achieve. What could have otherwise been macabre becomes a great piece of black humour". Sudhir Srinivasan of Cinema Express wrote the film's "inefficient digressions into comedy are a big problem" because "You get joke attempts where they scarcely seem to belong". Writing for Firstpost, Sreedhar Pillai wrote, "The drawbacks are there in plenty. After a racy first half, the pace slackens in the second half, along with some logical loopholes in the plot. However, at the end of the day, it is a Nayanthara show and she shines bright once again". Vikram Venkateswaran of The Quint wrote, "Only in an evolved movie can you switch from deep sorrow to fits of laughter. And Nelson wields this power over the audience with abandon", and rated the film four stars out of five. Anupama Subramanian of Deccan Chronicle wrote, "There is a lot of quirky moments in this dark comedy and much of the hilarity comes from unexpected instants. The first half is entertaining with the director sticking to his genre, treating even the darkest situations with humor. However, in the second half, the film meanders a bit without any solid comic relief and the climax is also unconvincing".

=== Box office ===
Kolamavu Kokila collected close to ₹4 crore (equivalent to ₹7.0 crore or US$720,000 in 2026) on the opening day. In its first nine days, the film had grossed ₹20 crore (US$2.1 million). It ended its theatrical run having collected ₹73 crore (equivalent to ₹127 crore or US$13 million in 2026) worldwide.

== Accolades ==
Date of ceremony	Award	Category	Recipient(s) and nominee(s)	Result	Ref.
5 January 2019	Ananda Vikatan Cinema Awards	Best Comedian – Male	Yogi Babu	Won	
25–28 April 2019	Norway Tamil Film Festival Awards	Best Comedian – Male	Yogi Babu	Won	
25–28 April 2019	Norway Tamil Film Festival Awards	Best Screenplay	Nelson Dilipkumar	Won	
15 August 2019	8th South Indian International Movie Awards	SIIMA Award for Best Actress	Nayanthara	Nominated	
15 August 2019	8th South Indian International Movie Awards	SIIMA Award for Best Male Playback Singer	Anirudh Ravichander	Nominated	
15 August 2019	8th South Indian International Movie Awards	SIIMA Award for Best Actress in a Supporting Role	Saranya Ponvannan	Nominated	
15 August 2019	8th South Indian International Movie Awards	SIIMA Award for Best Cinematographer	Sivakumar Vijayan	Nominated	
15 August 2019	8th South Indian International Movie Awards	SIIMA Award for Best Comedian	Yogi Babu	Won	
15 August 2019	8th South Indian International Movie Awards	SIIMA Award for Best Music Director	Anirudh Ravichander	Won	
15 August 2019	8th South Indian International Movie Awards	SIIMA Award for Best Debut Director	Nelson Dilipkumar	Won	
21 December 2019	66th Filmfare Awards South	Best Actress – Tamil	Nayanthara	Nominated	
21 December 2019	66th Filmfare Awards South	Best Supporting Actor – Tamil	Yogi Babu	Nominated	
21 December 2019	66th Filmfare Awards South	Best Supporting Actress – Tamil	Saranya Ponvannan	Won	
21 December 2019	66th Filmfare Awards South	Best Music Director – Tamil	Anirudh Ravichander	Nominated	
21 December 2019	66th Filmfare Awards South	Best Male Playback Singer – Tamil	Anirudh Ravichander (for "Kalyana Vayasu")	Nominated	

== Remakes and sequels ==
Kolamaavu Kokila was remade in Hindi as Good Luck Jerry (2022). In July 2023 Yogi Babu said it would have a sequel at the audio launch of Nelson's Jailer. Later that August, Nelson confirmed the sequel was in development.
