= Mana Shankara Vara Prasad Garu (soundtrack) =

- Soundtrack album cover

Soundtrack album by Bheems Ceciroleo
- Released: 10 January 2026
- Recorded: 2025–2026
- Studio: A Bheems Musicals, Hyderabad; Jubilee10 Studio, Hyderabad; Purple Haze Studio, Mumbai; New Edge Studios, Mumbai
- Genre: Feature film soundtrack
- Length: 13:22
- Language: Telugu
- Label: T-Series
- Producer: Bheems Ceciroleo

Bheems Ceciroleo chronology
12A Railway Colony (2025)	Mana Shankara Vara Prasad Garu (2026)	Bhartha Mahasayulaku Wignyapthi (2026)
External audio
- Mana Shankara Vara Prasad Garu — Audio Jukebox on YouTube

Singles from Mana Shankara Vara Prasad Garu
- 1. "Meesaala Pilla" Released: 14 October 2025; 2. "Sasirekha" Released: 7 December 2025; 3. "Mega Victory Mass Song" Released: 31 December 2025; 4. "Hook Step" Released: 7 January 2026

Mana Shankara Vara Prasad Garu is the soundtrack album composed by Bheems Ceciroleo to the 2026 Telugu-language action comedy film of the same name directed by Anil Ravipudi starring Chiranjeevi, Venkatesh, Nayanthara and Catherine Tresa. The film featured four songs with lyrics written by Ramajogayya Sastry, Anantha Sriram, Bhaskarabhatla and Kasarla Shyam. All the four songs in the album, were released as singles, before the complete release through T-Series on 10 January 2026.

== Background ==
The soundtrack to Mana Shankara Vara Prasad Garu is composed by Bheems Ceciroleo reuniting with Ravipudi after Sankranthiki Vasthunam (2025) and also marking his first collaboration with Chiranjeevi. The album featured two duet songs picturised on Chiranjeevi and Nayanthara—"Meesaala Pilla" and "Sasirekha"—the former is performed by Udit Narayan and Shweta Mohan, which utilizes electronic beats and synths followed by traditional percussions to enhance the mass appeal. The song combined contemporary orchestration with familiar melodic structure.

"Sasirekha" is sung by Bheems himself along with Madhu Priya. The song is an upbeat dance number, with rustic beats. A special song, "Mega Victory Mass Song" is picturized on Chiranjeevi and Venkatesh, and the song is performed by Nakash Aziz and Vishal Dadlani. "Hook Step" is the introductory song picturized on Chiranjeevi and is performed by Baba Sehgal.

== Release ==
"Meesaala Pilla" was teased as the first single on 2 October 2025, coinciding with Gandhi Jayanthi, and the full song was released on 14 October 2025. The song crossed 100 million views within two months of its release, advertising as "the biggest Telugu chartbuster of 2025". "Sasirekha" was released as the second single on 7 December. "Mega Victory Mass Song" was released as the third single on the New Year's Eve (31 December). The fourth song "Hook Step" was released on 7 January 2026, at the film's pre-release event held in Hyderabad. The soundtrack was released on 10 January, under the T-Series label.

== Track listing ==
No.	Title	Lyrics	Singer(s)	Length
1.	"Hook Step"	Ramajogayya Sastry	Baba Sehgal	2:18
2.	"Sasirekha"	Anantha Sriram	Bheems Ceciroleo, Madhu Priya	4:01
3.	"Meesaala Pilla"	Bhaskarabhatla	Udit Narayan, Shweta Mohan	3:47
4.	"Mega Victory Mass Song"	Kasarla Shyam	Nakash Aziz, Vishal Dadlani	3:16
Total length:				13:22

Extended Soundtrack
No.	Title	Lyrics	Singer(s)	Length
1.	"Peddi Reddy"	Raghuram	Chiranjeevi	1:00

== Reception ==
T. Maruthi Acharya of India Today wrote that Ceciroleo's music "works well within the film’s tone" and added that "the songs translate neatly onto the screen, and the background score supports the comedy and emotional beats without overpowering them". Sasidhar Adivi of Filmfare called Ceciroleo's music as a major highlight where, "songs like Meesala Pilla and Hook Step are catchy earworms, while the background score adds much-needed punch to the action sequences." Suresh Kavirayani of The New Indian Express admitted that the songs, "Meesala Pilla" and "Sasirekha" were "catchy and well picturised" and the "Mega Victory Mass Song" is "routine but effective for fans". Jalapathy Gudelli of Telugucinema.com wrote "The songs, though, are catchy and serve their purpose."

== Personnel ==
Credits adapted from T-Series:

- Music composer, arranger and producer: Bheems Ceciroleo
- Recording studios: A Bheems Musicals, Hyderabad; Krishna Audio, Mumbai; Purple Haze Studios, Mumbai
- Recording engineers: Aamir Shaikh, Mastan Vali, Rakesh Mickey, Shalem Kumar, Shiva B, Abhay Anant Rumde
- Pre-mixing: Mastan Vali
- Mixing: J Vinay Kumar, Kishore Kumar Sathala, Akash Shravan
- Mastering: Shadab Rayeen (New Edge Studios), Kishore Kumar Sathala (A Bheems Musicals), Akash Shravan (Chennai)
- Music production manager: Malya Kandukuri
- Music in-charges: KD Vincent, Ramanand Shetty
- Studio assistants: Sankaram, Rajesh, Chandu

Musicians

- Live rhythms and percussions: Bheems Ceciroleo
- Rhythms: Kalyan Chakravarthy, Vaidhy VR, Bharath Madhusudan, Midhun Asokan, Dathu Eswar, Agastya Raag, Sharon Ravi
- Keyboards: Dathu Eswar, Midhun Asokan, Balu, Vaidhy VR, Bharath Madhusudan, Agastya Raag
- Guitar and ethnic frets: SM Subhani
- Flute: Ramesh Kuppampati
- Solo violin: Sandilya Pisapati
- Additional vocals: Dathu Eswar
- Harmonies: Jayasri Pallem
- Male chorus: Arjun Vijay, Tusher Sambhara, Bharadwaj Krishna, Bheems Ceciroleo
- Female chorus: Sindhuja Srinivasan, Lakshmi Meghana, Manisha Pandranki
- Kids chorus: Vagdevi, Shragvi, Sri Harini Pallela
- Dialogue vox: Anil Ravipudi, Rohini Soratt
