= Sri Venkateswara Creations =

Indian film studio

- Type: Private
- Industry: Entertainment
- Founded: 2003; 23 years ago
- Founder: Dil Raju; Sirish Reddy; Laxman; Giri
- Headquarters: Hyderabad, Telangana, India
- Key people: Dil Raju; Sirish Reddy; Harshith Reddy
- Products: Films
- Revenue: ▲US$51 million (2022)
- Subsidiaries: Sri Venkateswara Film Distributors; Starium Innovative Healthcare (3%); Dil Raju Entertainment

Sri Venkateswara Creations is an Indian film production company based in Hyderabad. It was established by Dil Raju in 2003 and has produced several Telugu films. The company also has a subsidiary film distribution business named Sri Venkateswara Film Distributors.

Some of the notable films produced by the company include Dil (2003), Arya (2004), Bhadra (2005), Bommarillu (2006), Kotha Bangaru Lokam (2008), Brindavanam (2010), Mr. Perfect (2011), Seethamma Vakitlo Sirimalle Chettu (2013), Shatamanam Bhavati (2017), Fidaa (2017), F2: Fun and Frustration (2019), Maharshi (2019), Varisu (2023), and Sankranthiki Vasthunam (2025). Eight directors debuted in Telugu cinema through Sri Venkateswara Creations — Sukumar, Boyapati Srinu, Bhaskar, Vamshi Paidipally, Srikanth Addala, Vasu Varma, Ravi Yadav, and Venu Sriram.

== History ==
=== Background ===
Raju and his brothers started film distribution in the early 1990s and partnered with Venkata Lakshmi Films. In 1996, they opened a new office with the name Sri Harshita Films. Most of the films that they distributed were unsuccessful at the box-office and they incurred heavy losses leading them to shut the company. After few more years studying the market, they established Sri Venkateswara Film Distributors in 1999. They chose to distribute films in the Nizam area which refers to the esrstwhile Hyderabad State and present-day Telangana. The first three films distributed were Oke Okkadu (1999), Nuvvu Vastavani (2000), and Sakhi (2000). They went on to distribute more films like Nuvvu Naaku Nachav (2001), Murari (2001), Kushi (2001), Aadi (2002), Athadu (2005), Chatrapati (2005), and Pokiri (2006).

=== Founding of Production company and success ===
After distributing films for four years, Raju, along with Giri, Sirish, and Lakshman, established Sri Venkateswara Creations production house in 2003. The first film that was made under the banner was Dil (2003), directed by V. V. Vinayak. After Dil, Giri has separated himself from the banner, while the rest continued. In 2004, they made Arya (2004) under the direction debut of Sukumar. In 2005, they made another successful film Bhadra, under the direction of Boyapati Srinu. In 2006, they produced Bommarillu under the direction of Bhaskar.

By the end of the year 2018, 40 films associated with the banner were released: out of which 30 films were produced by them, 6 were dubbed films, and 4 were collaborations. In an interview with Anil Ravipudi for GreatAndhra website, Dil Raju claimed that 22 of his 30 films (2003–2018) were either hits, super-hits, or classics; 4 were average grossers; and 4 films were flops.

In 2019, Sri Venkateswara Creations produced F2: Fun and Frustration, which was released on the occasion of Sankranthi. It became the highest-grossing film for the company and is one of the highest grossers of all time in Telugu cinema. In 2022, they forayed into Tamil cinema with Varisu (2023), that released on Pongal 2023, starring Vijay and Rashmika Mandanna in the lead roles. It was directed by Vamshi Paidipally with music by Thaman S. Though it opened to mixed reviews, it became a huge money spinner at the box-office and became the highest-grossing film for the company.

They continued their association with Anil Ravipudi by producing Sankranthiki Vasthunam, starring Venkatesh, Aishwarya Rajesh, and Meenakshi Chaudhary in the lead roles. Upon release during Sankranthi 2025, it because a huge commercial success and ended up becoming the highest-grossing film for the company in Telugu and the highest grossing solo film for Venkatesh.

== Filmography ==
Key
†	Denotes films that have not yet been released

=== Sri Venkateswara Creations ===
Year	Film	Director	Notes
2003	Dil	V. V. Vinayak	Co-production with Giri
2004	Arya	Sukumar	
2005	Bhadra	Boyapati Srinu	
2006	Bommarillu	Bhaskar	
2007	Munna	Vamshi Paidipally	
2008	Parugu	Bhaskar	
2008	Kotha Bangaru Lokam	Srikanth Addala	
2009	Josh	Vasu Varma	
2010	Maro Charitra	Ravi Yadav	In Collaboration with Matinee Entertainments
2010	Rama Rama Krishna Krishna	Sriwass	
2010	Brindavanam	Vamshi Paidipally	
2011	Gaganam	Radha Mohan	In Collaboration with Matinee Entertainments
2011	Mr. Perfect	Dasaradh	
2011	Oh My Friend	Venu Sriram	
2013	Seethamma Vakitlo Sirimalle Chettu	Srikanth Addala	
2013	Ramayya Vasthavayya	Harish Shankar	
2014	Yevadu	Vamsi Paidipally	
2014	Pilla Nuvvu Leni Jeevitham	A. S. Ravi Kumar Chowdary	In collaboration with Geetha Arts
2015	Kerintha	Sai Kiran Adivi	
2015	Subramanyam for Sale	Harish Shankar	
2016	Krishnastami	Vasu Varma	
2016	Supreme	Anil Ravipudi	
2017	Sathamanam Bhavati	Satish Vegesna	
2017	Nenu Local	Trinadha Rao Nakkina	
2017	DJ: Duvvada Jagannadham	Harish Shankar	
2017	Fidaa	Sekhar Kammula	
2017	Raja The Great	Anil Ravipudi	
2017	Middle Class Abbayi	Venu Sriram	
2018	Lover	Anish R. Krishna	
2018	Srinivasa Kalyanam	Satish Vegesna	
2018	Hello Guru Prema Kosame	Trinadha Rao Nakkina	
2019	F2	Anil Ravipudi	
2019	Maharshi	Vamshi Paidipally	In collaboration with Vyjayanthi Movies and PVP Cinema
2019	Iddari Lokam Okate	G. R. Krishna	
2020	Jaanu	C. Prem Kumar	
2020	V	Mohana Krishna Indraganti	
2021	Shaadi Mubarak	Padmasri	In collaboration with Srinivas Reddy
2021	Vakeel Saab	Venu Sriram	In collaboration with Boney Kapoor
2021	Paagal	Naresh Kuppili	In collaboration with Bekkem Venugopal of Lucky Media
2021	Nootokka Jillala Andagadu	Rachakonda Vidyasagar	In collaboration with Krish's First Frame Entertainments
2021	Ori Devuda	Ashwath Marimuthu	In collaboration with PVP Cinema
2022	Rowdy Boys	Sree Harsha Konuganti	
2022	F3	Anil Ravipudi	
2022	Thank You	Vikram Kumar	
2023	Varisu	Vamsi Paidipally	Debut in Tamil cinema
2023	Shaakuntalam	Gunasekhar	In collaboration with Guna Team Works
2024	The Family Star	Parasuram	
2025	Game Changer	S. Shankar	
2025	Sankranthiki Vasthunam	Anil Ravipudi	
2025	Thammudu	Venu Sriram	
2026	Rowdy Janardhana †	Ravi Kiran Kola	
2027	DeThadi †	Aditya Rao Gangasani	
2027	Yellamma †	Venu Yeldandi	
2027	Untitled film †	Anees Bazmee	In collaboration with Cape of Good Films
2027	Monster †	Vamshi Paidipally	

=== Presentations ===
Year	Film	Notes
2009	Akasamantha	Telugu version of Prakash Raj's Abhiyum Naanum
2012	Tuneega Tuneega	In collaboration with Maganti Ramji of Padmini Arts banner
2017	Jawaan	In collaboration with Arunachal Creations' Krishna
2020	Sarileru Neekevvaru	In collaboration with AK Entertainments and GMB Entertainment
2019	Aaviri	In collaboration with Ravi Babu's Flying Frogs
2022	Good Luck Sakhi	In collaboration with Sudheer Chandra Padiri's Worth A Shot Motion Arts

=== Distribution ===
This list is not complete and needs updating. This company and its predecessors have been distributing films in Nizam region, and occasionally Vizag region since 1999.

Key
†	Denotes films that have not yet been released

Year	Film	Distribution Area
1999	Oke Okkadu	Nizam
2000	Nuvvu Vastavani	Nizam
2000	Sakhi	Nizam
2001	Murari	Nizam
2001	Khushi	Nizam
2001	Nuvvu Naaku Nachav	Nizam
2002	Amrutha	Nizam
2002	Aadi	Nizam
2003	Dil	
2004	Arya	
2005	Bhadra	
2005	Athadu	Nizam
2005	Chatrapati	Nizam
2006	Pokiri	Nizam
2006	Godavari	
2006	Ashok	Nizam
2006	Bommarillu	
2006	Annavaram	
2007	Jagadam	Nizam
2007	Dhee	
2007	Munna	
2007	Aata	Nizam
2007	Hello Premistara	
2007	Happy Days	Andhra Pradesh
2008	Parugu	
2008	Ullasamga Utsahamga	Andhra Pradesh
2008	Ready	
2008	Surya s/o Krishnan	Nizam
2008	Vinayakudu	Nizam, Vizag
2008	Homam	Andhra Pradesh
2008	Yuvatha	Nizam, Vizag
2008	Kotha Bangaru Lokam	
2008	Boni (film)	
2009	Arya 2	
2009	Saarai Veerraju	Nizam, Vizag
2009	Mallanna	Nizam, Vizag
2009	Ganesh	
2009	Aakashamantha	
2009	Josh	
2010	Kedi	
2010	Maro Charitra	
2010	Darling	Nizam
2010	Rama Rama Krishna Krishna	
2010	Golimaar	Nizam
2010	Vedam	Nizam
2010	Brindavanam	
2011	Gaganam	
2011	Shakti	Nizam
2011	Mr. Perfect	Guntur
2011	100% Love	Tamil Nadu
2011	Oh My Friend	
2012	Snehithudu	
2012	Dhoni	
2012	Rachaa	Nizam
2012	Dammu	Nizam
2012	Gabbar Singh	Nizam
2012	Daruvu	Nizam
2012	Andala Rakshasi	Andhra Pradesh
2012	Life Is Beautiful	Nizam
2012	Rebel	Nizam
2012	Cameraman Gangatho Rambabu	Nizam
2012	Damarukam	Nizam
2013	Naayak	Nizam
2013	Seethamma Vakitlo Sirimalle Chettu	
2013	Mirchi	Nizam
2013	Baadshah	Nizam
2014	Yevadu	
2014	Prathinidhi	
2014	Power	Nizam
2014	Lovers	Nizam
2015	Pataas	Andhra Pradesh and Telangana
2015	S/O Satyamurthy	Nizam
2015	Dagudumootha Dandakor	Andhra Pradesh and Telangana
2015	Baahubali: The Beginning	Nizam
2016	Remo	
2016	Naanna Nenu Naa Boyfriends	
2017	Jai Lava Kusa	
2017	Jaya Janaki Nayaka	Nizam
2017	Goutham Nanda	Nizam
2018	Bharat Ane Nenu	Nizam
2018	Tholi Prema	Nizam
2020	Athade Srimannarayana	Andhra Pradesh and Telangana
2021	Akhanda	Nizam
2022	Beast	Andhra Pradesh and Telangana
2022	K.G.F: Chapter 2	Andhra Pradesh and Telangana
2022	Ponniyin Selvan: I	Andhra Pradesh and Telangana
2022	Masooda	Andhra Pradesh and Telangana
2023	Vaarasudu	Andhra Pradesh and Telangana
2023	Dasara	Andhra Pradesh and Telangana
2023	Ponniyin Selvan: II	Andhra Pradesh and Telangana
2023	Jawan	Andhra Pradesh and Telangana
2023	Animal	Andhra Pradesh and Telangana
2023	Dunki	Nizam
2023	Bhagavanth Kesari	Nizam
2023	Leo	Nizam
2024	Premalu	Andhra Pradesh and Telangana
2024	Saripodhaa Sanivaaram	Andhra Pradesh and Telangana
2024	Devara: Part 1	Nizam
2025	Pelli Kani Prasad	
2025	L2: Empuraan	Andhra Pradesh and Telangana
2025	They Call Him OG	Nizam and Vizag
2025	HIT: The Third Case	Nizam
2026	Korean Kanakaraju	Nizam and Vizag
2026	Nagabandham: The Secret Treasure	Nizam
2026	Toxic	Andhra Pradesh and Telangana
2026	Scene	Nizam
2026	Ramayana: Part 1	Andhra Pradesh and Telangana
2026	ENE Repeat	Andhra Pradesh and Telangana
2026	Hatah	Nizam and Vizag
2026	Mysaa	Nizam and Vizag
2026	Vrushakarma †	Andhra Pradesh, Telangana, and Karnataka
2027	January 12 Vidudala †	Nizam

== Awards ==
National Film Awards

- Best Popular Film Providing Wholesome Entertainment – Golden Lotus (producer) – Sathamanam Bhavati – (2016)
- Best Popular Film Providing Wholesome Entertainment – Golden Lotus (producer) – Maharshi – (2019)

Gaddar Awards

- Best Feature Film (Gold) - Sathamanam Bhavati (2016)
- Best Feature Film (Gold) - Maharshi (2019)
- Best Feature Film (Silver) - Fidaa (2017)

Nandi Awards

- Best Feature Film (Gold) – Bommarillu (2006)
- Best Feature Film (Bronze) – Parugu (2008)
- Akkineni Award for Best Home-viewing Feature Film – Seethamma Vakitlo Sirimalle Chettu (2013)
- Nagi Reddy-Chakrapani National Award for contributions to popular cinema – (2013)

Filmfare Awards South

- Filmfare Award for Best Film – Telugu – Bommarillu (2006)

Santosham Film Awards

- Santosham D. Ramanaidu Smarakam Award (2019)

Other Awards

- Nagi Reddy Memorial Award for the Best Telugu Family Entertainer of the year 2011 – Mr. Perfect

== Subsidiary ==
=== Dil Raju Productions ===
Year	Film	Language	Notes
2022	Jersey	Hindi	In collaboration with Suryadevara Naga Vamsi and Aman Gill
2022	HIT: The First Case	Hindi	In collaboration with T-Series and Kuldeep Rathore
2023	ATM	Telugu	ZEE5 series
2023	Balagam	Telugu	
2024	Love Me	Telugu	
2024	Janaka Aithe Ganaka	Telugu	

=== Awards ===
Gaddar Awards

- Best Feature Film (Gold) - Balagam (2023)
