= SIIMA Award for Best Director – Telugu =

South Indian film award

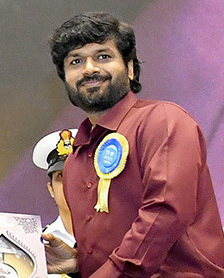
- The 2026 recipient: Anil Ravipudi
- Awarded for: Best Direction Achievement in Telugu cinema
- Country: India
- Presented by: Vibri Media Group
- First award: 21 June 2012 (for films released in 2011)
- Most recent winner: Anil Ravipudi, Sankranthiki Vasthunam (2025)

Highlights
- Most wins: S. S. Rajamouli and Sukumar (3)
- Most nominations: Trivikram Srinivas (5)

SIIMA Award for Best Director – Telugu is presented by the Vibri Media Group as part of its annual South Indian International Movie Awards, for best film direction done by a director in Telugu films. The award was first given in 2012 for films released in 2011. Trivikram Srinivas is the most nominated with five nominations whereas, S. S. Rajamouli and Sukumar are the most awarded with three wins each.

== Superlatives ==
Categories	Recipient	Notes
Most wins	S. S. Rajamouli	3
Most wins	Sukumar	3
Most nominations	Trivikram Srinivas	5
Most nominations without a win	Koratala Siva	4

== Winners ==
Year	Director	Film	Ref
2011	Srinu Vaitla	Dookudu	
2012	Harish Shankar	Gabbar Singh	
2013	Trivikram Srinivas	Attarintiki Daredi	
2014	Surender Reddy	Race Gurram	
2015	S. S. Rajamouli	Baahubali: The Beginning	
2016	Vamsi Paidipally	Oopiri	
2017	S. S. Rajamouli	Baahubali 2: The Conclusion	
2018	Sukumar	Rangasthalam	
2019	Vamshi Paidipally	Maharshi	
2020	Trivikram Srinivas	Ala Vaikunthapurramuloo	
2021	Sukumar	Pushpa: The Rise	
2022	S. S. Rajamouli	RRR	
2023	Srikanth Odela	Dasara	
2024	Sukumar	Pushpa 2: The Rule	
2025	Anil Ravipudi	Sankranthiki Vasthunam	

== Nominations ==
- 2011: Srinu Vaitla – Dookudu
  - V. V. Vinayak – Badrinath
  - Dasaradh – Mr. Perfect
  - Sukumar – 100% Love
  - Bapu – Sri Rama Rajyam
- 2012: Harish Shankar – Gabbar Singh
  - S. S. Rajamouli – Eega
  - Vikram Kumar – Ishq
  - Trivikram Srinivas – Julai
  - Puri Jagannadh – Businessman
- 2013: Trivikram Srinivas – Attarintiki Daredi
  - Koratala Siva – Mirchi
  - Srikanth Addala – Seethamma Vakitlo Sirimalle Chettu
  - Vijaykumar Konda – Gunde Jaari Gallanthayyinde
  - V. V. Vinayak – Naayak
- 2014: Surender Reddy – Race Gurram
  - Srivass – Loukyam
  - Boyapati Srinu – Legend
  - Vikram Kumar – Manam
  - Srikanth Addala – Mukunda
- 2015: S. S. Rajamouli – Baahubali: The Beginning
  - Gunasekhar – Rudramadevi
  - Koratala Siva – Srimanthudu
  - Krish – Kanche
  - Maruthi – Bhale Bhale Magadivoy
- 2016: Vamsi Paidipally – Oopiri
  - Boyapati Srinu – Sarrainodu
  - Koratala Siva – Janatha Garage
  - Sukumar – Nannaku Prematho
  - Trivikram Srinivas – A Aa
- 2017: S. S. Rajamouli – Baahubali 2: The Conclusion
  - Krish – Gautamiputra Satakarni
  - Sandeep Reddy Vanga – Arjun Reddy
  - Sankalp Reddy – Ghazi
  - Satish Vegesna – Sathamanam Bhavati
- 2018: Sukumar – Rangasthalam
  - Indraganti Mohan Krishna – Sammohanam
  - Nag Ashwin – Mahanati
  - Parasuram – Geetha Govindam
  - Trivikram Srinivas – Aravinda Sametha Veera Raghava
- 2019: Vamshi Paidipally – Maharshi
  - B. V. Nandini Reddy – Oh! Baby
  - Puri Jagannadh – iSmart Shankar
  - Anil Ravipudi – F2: Fun and Frustration
  - Gowtam Tinnanuri – Jersey
  - Shiva Nirvana – Majili
- 2020: Trivikram Srinivas – Ala Vaikunthapurramuloo
  - Anil Ravipudi – Sarileru Neekevvaru
  - Venky Kudumula – Bheeshma
  - Venkatesh Maha – Uma Maheswara Ugra Roopasya
  - Mohana Krishna Indraganti – V
- 2021: Sukumar – Pushpa: The Rise
  - Boyapati Srinu – Akhanda
  - Gopichand Malineni – Krack
  - K. V. Anudeep – Jathi Ratnalu
  - Rahul Sankrityan – Shyam Singha Roy
  - Prasanth Varma – Zombie Reddy
- 2022: S. S. Rajamouli – RRR
  - Chandoo Mondeti – Karthikeya 2
  - Hanu Raghavapudi – Sita Ramam
  - Sashi Kiran Tikka – Major
  - Vimal Krishna – DJ Tillu
- 2023: Srikanth Odela – Dasara
  - Anil Ravipudi – Bhagavanth Kesari
  - Bobby Kolli – Waltair Veerayya
  - Gopichand Malineni – Veera Simha Reddy
  - Karthik Varma Dandu – Virupaksha
  - Sai Rajesh – Baby
- 2024: Sukumar – Pushpa 2: The Rule
  - Koratala Siva – Devara: Part 1
  - Nag Ashwin – Kalki 2898 AD
  - Prasanth Varma – Hanu-Man
  - Venky Atluri – Lucky Baskhar
- 2025: Anil Ravipudi – Sankranthiki Vasthunam
  - Chandoo Mondeti – Thandel
  - Karthik Gattamneni – Mirai
  - Rahul Ravindran – The Girlfriend
  - Sujeeth – They Call Him OG
  - Sailesh Kolanu – HIT: The Third Case

== See also ==
- SIIMA Award for Best Debut Director – Telugu
