= Raja the Great =

2017 action comedy film by Anil Ravipudi

- Theatrical release poster
- Directed by: Anil Ravipudi
- Written by: Anil Ravipudi
- Produced by: Dil Raju
- Starring: Ravi Teja; Mehreen Pirzada; Radhika
- Cinematography: Mohana Krishna
- Edited by: Tammiraju
- Music by: Sai Karthik
- Production company: Sri Venkateswara Creations
- Release date: 18 October 2017
- Running time: 150 minutes
- Country: India
- Language: Telugu
- Box office: est. ₹52 crore

Raja the Great is a 2017 Indian Telugu-language action comedy film written and directed by Anil Ravipudi and produced by Dil Raju on Sri Venkateswara Creations banner. The film stars Ravi Teja as a visually impaired man, alongside Mehreen Pirzada and Radhika. Vivan Bhatena (in his Telugu Debut), Rajendra Prasad, Prakash Raj and Sampath Raj play supporting roles with music composed by Sai Karthik. The film marks the debut of Teja's son Mahadhan as child actor.

The film began its production began in April 2017 with filming taking place in Hyderabad and Darjeeling. Released worldwide on 18 October 2017, the film received mixed reviews from critics and audience with praise towards the cast performances, action sequences and entertainment value but criticism for writing and uneven tone. It was a commercial success grossing over ₹52 crore.

== Plot ==
Devaraj kidnaps Lucky. Prakash confronts him and Devaraj and him and his team mates sacrificed themselves so Lucky can escape. Lucky doesn't want another police officer to die for her.

She goes personally to Viswaraj with Raja and his best friend Bujji. She comes with a big basket of sweets. Viswaraj's wife calls him, telling to include Raja in this mission (she loves sweets). Since Viswaraj didn't want to get in a fight with his wife, he allows Raja in the mission.

== Cast ==
- Ravi Teja as Raja, Lucky's love-interest and Constable Anantha Lakshmi's son
  - Mahadhan Bhupathiraju as Young Raj
- Mehreen Pirzada as Lucky, Raja's love-interest and SP Prakash's daughter
  - Samskruthi as Young Lucky
- Radhika as Constable Anantha Lakshmi, Raja's mother
- Vivan Bhatena as Devaraj (Voice dubbed by Vedala Hemachandra)
- Rajendra Prasad as in dual role as Prasad and Prasad's Father
- Prakash Raj as SP Prakash, Lucky's Father
- Sampath Raj as IG Viswaraj
- Tanikella Bharani as Mailaramgadda, Devaraj's father
- Ali as Kabaddi Team Player
- Posani Krishna Murali as Lucky's uncle
- Raghu Babu as SI Babu Rao
- Prudhvi Raj as Bank Manager Babji
- Jaya Prakash Reddy as Devaraj's henchmen
- Srinivasa Reddy as Bujji, Raja's friend
- P. Sai Kumar as Surya Murthy
- Rajiv Kanakala as Police Officer
- Ravi Prakash as Police Officer
- Bharath Reddy as Police Officer
- Banerjee as Kung Fu Coach
- Surya as Raja's father
- Gautham Raju as Sahaayam
- Satyam Rajesh as Lucky's uncle
- Prabhas Sreenu as Lucky's uncle
- Chitram Srinu as Lucky's uncle
- Annapurna as Prasad's mother
- Pavitra Lokesh as Gayatri and Prasad's wife
- Vidyullekha Raman as Pandu, Lucky's friend
- Karate Kalyani as Servant Saraswathi
- Hari Teja as Lucky's aunt
- Surekha Vani as Lucky's aunt
- Shanoor Sana as Lucky's aunt
- Rajitha as Viswaraj's wife
- Raghu Karumanchi as Kabaddi Team Player
- John Kokken as Devaraj's henchmen
- Bithiri Sathi as Kabaddi Team Player
- Chammak Chandra as Bank Cashier Siddharth
- Ramachandra as Swamiji
- Racha Ravi
- Viva Harsha as Police Warriors (Commentator)
- Viva Raghav as Bank Bulls (Commentator)
- Sampoornesh Babu as Peter
- Saptagiri as Seenu
- Thagubothu Ramesh as Sastry
- Raashii Khanna as a special appearance in the song "Naake Ne Nachestunna"
- Anil Ravipudi (cameo appearance in the song "Raja The Great")

== Production ==
Anil Ravipudi had the idea to make a film with visually impaired character as a lead as he was fascinated by the talents they have. Ravipudi however didn't want the film to be art film and wrote the script in a commercial format. Ravipudi approached Ram Pothineni and N. T. Rama Rao Jr. for the film but Ravi Teja was finalized. Mehreen Pirzada was cast opposite Teja.

Principal photography of the film began in April 2017 in Hyderabad. The production moved to Darjeeling later that month. 70% of the shoot was completed by July 2017.

== Release ==
The film was released on 18 October 2017. The film was later dubbed and released in Tamil as Raja Raja Dhan in 2019 and the film was dubbed in Malayalam under the same title in 2021. The Hindi dubbed version was directly premiered on Goldmines TV channel on 3 July 2022.

== Soundtrack ==
Raja The Great

Soundtrack album by Sai Karthik
- Released: 4 October 2017
- Recorded: 2017
- Genre: Soundtrack
- Length: 17:16
- Label: Aditya Music
- Producer: Sai Karthik

Sai Karthik chronology
Darsakudu (2017)	Raja The Great (2017)	Next Nuvve (2017)

The music is composed by Sai Karthik and released on Aditya Music Company. Raja The Great (Title Song) was released online, for which Ravi Teja gave his voice.

No.	Title	Lyrics	Singer(s)	Length
1.	"Raja The Great"	Kasarla Shyam	Ravi Teja, L. V. Revanth, K. Saketh, Sri Krishna	3:42
2.	"Nake Ne Nachestunna"	Ramajogayya Sastry	Sameera Bharadwaj, M.L. Shruti	3:21
3.	"Chinnari"	Ramajogayya Sastry	Haricharan, Divija Kartheek	3:10
4.	"Allabe Allabe"	Ramajogayya Sastry	Yazin Nizar, Aditya Iyengar, Sri Krishna	3:00
5.	"Yenniyalo Yenniyalo"	Kasarla Shyam	Sai Karthik	4:03
Total length:				17:16

== Reception ==
Karthik Keramulu writing for the Firstpost rated 2.5 of 5 and wrote: "Raja The Great is an okayish entertaining affair in the theatre. However, the minute one walks out of the movie house, there’d be nothing to pull from the bed of the two-and-a-half-hour comedy to laugh about." The Hindu's Sangeetha Devi stated: "Anil Ravipudi takes the mass route with a blind protagonist and the result is silly humour." The Indian Express critic Manoj Kumar R who rated 2 stars, opined: "You don't go to watch a Ravi Teja film, which is directed by Anil Ravipudi, expecting a Nayakan. It's only fair that we judge his latest offering, Raja The Great, by the standards of mindless entertainers."

== Sequel ==
Ravipudi confirmed the film's sequel in one of the interviews, stating: "There is a slight tease at the very end of the rolling titles hinting at the possibility of a sequel for the actioner. The sequel will definitely happen but I can’t tell you the exact schedule of the shooting, release, and other details at the moment."
