= F3 (film) =

2022 film by Anil Ravipudi

- Theatrical release poster
- Directed by: Anil Ravipudi
- Written by: Anil Ravipudi
- Produced by: Dil Raju; Sirish
- Starring: Venkatesh; Varun Tej; Tamannaah Bhatia; Mehreen Pirzada
- Cinematography: Sai Sriram
- Edited by: Tammiraju
- Music by: Devi Sri Prasad
- Production company: Sri Venkateswara Creations
- Distributed by: Dil Raju Production
- Release date: 27 May 2022
- Running time: 148 minutes
- Country: India
- Language: Telugu
- Budget: ₹60 crore
- Box office: ₹110 crore

F3: Fun and Frustration is a 2022 Indian Telugu-language comedy film written and directed by Anil Ravipudi and produced by Dil Raju and Sirish under the banner Sri Venkateswara Creations. It is a standalone sequel to F2: Fun and Frustration (2019). The film stars Venkatesh, Varun Tej, Tamannaah Bhatia and Mehreen Pirzada reprising their roles from the prequel. Devi Sri Prasad composed the music.

Principal photography commenced in December 2020 and ended in January 2022; filming took place in Hyderabad. The film was released on 27 May 2022 to mixed reviews, but still it emerged to be a commercial success, F3 has grossed a total of ₹900 million (US$9.6 million) in worldwide markets.

== Plot ==
Venky, who works as an agent at a RTO in Hyderabad, struggles to meet his ends and suffers from night blindness but hides his disability from everyone. His friend Varun Yadav, an orphan who stutter plans various schemes to make money, but to no avail. After investing in Harika's family restaurant, Venky and his friend lose much of their money. In a search for cash, Varun mistakes Harika's sister Honey for a rich woman and plans to marry her. Venky agrees to fund Varun's plan, failing to recognize Honey due to his disability. Venky and Varun take a vast loan from Pala Baby, a local landlord, by pledging their property. After spending lakhs of rupees by giving expensive gifts and cash to Honey, they realize their mistake while Harika's family loses all their money in shares.

Pala Baby, who worships women, drops his plans to waive off the loan after realizing the guile methods of Harika's family. They all reach the police station to settle their issue, where CI Nagaraju, an honest policeman who is on the brink of losing his job, hatches a plan to raid commissioner Dileep Chandra's house with them to steal the illegally acquired cash and diamonds. They successfully execute their plan and hide the valuables in the boot of a scrap car. While doing so, they also rescue a kidnapped girl. The following morning, they confess their robbery to Dileep out of fear. However, the car goes missing, and Dileep threatens their life if they fail to return the stolen amount. When Venky, Varun, Harika, and Nagaraju are about to commit suicide, they receive news that billionaire Anand Sharma is looking for his prodigal son.

They decide to go to his place and claim themselves as his son to steal his wealth. However, they almost die because of their plans of committing suicide. Thankfully, they get saved on rare occasions. They all reach his place in Vizianagaram. Venky, Varun, Harika (in a male disguise), and a junior artist hired by Nagaraju present themselves as Anand's son. Unsure of who the right person is, Anand lets everyone stay in his palace. They scheme against each other and utterly fail to impress Anand. All the contenders endure the toughest of the tests given by Anand. As a final effort, Anand announces that whoever brings his F3 toy factory to profits shall be declared his heir. Putting their differences aside, all the contenders collaborate to create a new toy to achieve profit. They develop a set of interactive toys by merchandising Telugu film characters, namely, Amarendra Baahubali, Gabbar Singh, Ajay Krishna, Veera Raghava, Chitti Babu and Bantu.

The sales skyrocket, and the factory earns a bumper profit. Together, they elect Varun and present him as his rightful heir to Anand. However, Anand reveals that his son died by suicide several years ago after earning money by fraudulent means. Since they rescued his granddaughter, Anand allows them to prove themselves and offers them the profit they earned. Venky and Varun realize their mistakes and give up the money. Later, subordinates abduct Anand, who demands a ransom of ₹100 crore (US$11 million). Venky, Varun, and others arrive at the place, but the goons attack them. Initially, they try to confuse them, but when the plan fails, Venky dresses up as Narappa and Varun as Vakeel Saab and thrashes the goons together. When they are trying to leave, the police arrive and arrest everyone.

Meanwhile, the thief who stole the car reveals to Dileep that he sold all the diamonds at a cheap rate, mistaking them for regular gemstones, and later gets elected as an MLA with the support of his buyers, and Dileep, ousts from his job join him as an assistant. Finally, the movie ends happily by showing the troop proceeding on a jolly trip to Goa, which director Anil Ravipudi diverts to a new destination, F4.

== Cast ==
- Venkatesh as Venky
- Varun Tej as Varun Yadav
- Tamannaah Bhatia as Harika
- Mehreen Pirzada as Honey
- Rajendra Prasad as Nagaraju
- Murali Sharma as Anand Prasad
- Sunil as Katthi Seenu
- Sonal Chauhan as American girl
- Vennela Kishore as Junior Artist, Gudivada Gurunatham's son
- Ali as Pala Baby
- Sampath Raj as Commissioner Dileep Chandra
- Raghu Babu as Venky's companion
- Tulasi as Venky's stepmother
- Goparaju Ramana as Venky's father
- Sathvik Varma as Venky's stepbrother
- Satya as the thief
- Pragathi as Padma, Harika's and Honey's mother
- Pradeep Kondiparthi as Harika's and Honey's father
- Annapoorna as Harika's and Honey's paternal grandmother
- Y. Vijaya as Harika's and Honey's maternal grandmother
- Srikanth Iyengar as Sharma, Anand Prasad's assistant
- Prudhvi Raj as Palace Incharge
- Tanikella Bharani as Police officer
- Gundu Sudarshan as Landowner
- Rajitha as Land Owner's wife
- Vasu Inturi as Honey's driver
- Rajendran as Gudivada Gurunatham
- Mime Gopi as The goon
- Srinivasa Reddy as The goon's henchman
- Divya Sripada as Vishal Mitthal's daughter
- Getup Srinu as Bull Chittibabu's breeder
- Duvvasi Mohan as Bull Chittibabu's breeder

=== Cameo appearance ===
- Pooja Hegde as herself in the song "Life Ante Itta Vundaala"
- Anil Ravipudi as himself

== Production ==
=== Development ===
Following the success of F2: Fun and Frustration (2019), studio owner Dil Raju announced its sequel in February 2019. He added that a third lead actor will be cast for the sequel. However, in April 2020, director Ravipudi clarified that there was little space for a third protagonist. In an interview in March 2021, Ravipudi said: "F3 is not a [direct] sequel to F2. It is completely a new story where the leads are seen getting frustrated caused by money."

=== Cast and crew ===
Venkatesh, Tej, Prasad, Tamannaah and Pirzada are reprising their roles in the sequel. Devi Sri Prasad, who scored the music for F2, is retained as the music composer. Sunil and Murali Sharma signed to play a key roles in the film. In April 2021, it was reported that Anjali was cast in the film, though there is no official communication yet. Rajendra Prasad was also set to return with a different role. Venkatesh plays a night blind while Tej's character would be suffering from stuttering. Sonal Chauhan confirmed that her appearance in the film in October 2021, describing her role as a "surprise". In April 2022, Pooja Hegde was signed on for a special song.

=== Filming ===
F3 was formally launched on 6 December 2020. Principal photography of the film began on 26 December 2020 in Hyderabad. Varun Tej has joined the production in January 2021. Due to COVID-19 pandemic in India, filming was paused from April to June. Filming was planned to be resumed in July 2021 with 10-day long schedule. However, the filming resumed in September 2021. In December 2021, filming took place at Charminar and nearly 85% of the shoot is completed. The talkie portions were wrapped in January 2022 with only a song left to shoot. A special song featuring Hegde was filmed in April 2022 at a specially constructed set at the Annapurna Studios.

== Music ==
F3

Soundtrack album by Devi Sri Prasad
- Released: 3 June 2022
- Recorded: 2021–2022
- Genre: Feature film soundtrack
- Length: 13:56
- Language: Telugu
- Label: Aditya Music
- Producer: Devi Sri Prasad

Devi Sri Prasad chronology
Aadavaallu Meeku Joharlu (2022)	F3 (2022)	The Warriorr (2022)
External audio
- Audio Jukebox on YouTube

Singles from F3
- 1. "Lab Dab Lab Dab Dabboo" Released: 7 February 2022; 2. "Woo Aaa Aha Aha" Released: 22 April 2022; 3. "Life Ante Itta Vundaala" Released: 17 May 2022

The soundtrack and score of the film is composed by Devi Sri Prasad. The audio rights were acquired by Aditya Music. First single "Lab Dab Dabboo" was released in February 2021. The second single "Woo Aaa Aha Aha" was released on 22 April 2022.

On 17 May 2022, the third single track "Life Ante Itta Vundaala" was launched, which had vocals by Geetha Madhuri and Rahul Sipligunj. The song featuring Pooja Hegde received positive response.

No.	Title	Lyrics	Singer(s)	Length
1.	"Lab Dab Lab Dab Dabboo"	Bhaskarabhatla	Ram Miriyala	4:19
2.	"Woo Aaa Aha Aha"	Kasarla Shyam	Sagar, Sunidhi Chauhan, Lavita Lobo, S.P. Abhishek	4:05
3.	"Life Ante Itta Vundaala"	Kasarla Shyam	Geetha Madhuri, Rahul Sipligunj	4:13
4.	"Ningi Nela"	Kasarla Shyam	Chinnaponnu	1:18
Total length:				13:56

== Release ==
=== Theatrical ===
F3 was released on 27 May 2022. Earlier, it was scheduled to be released on 27 August 2021, but was deferred due to the COVID-19 pandemic. It was later scheduled to release theatrically on 25 February 2022, but was postponed to avoid clash with Bheemla Nayak which released on that date. Its release date was scheduled as 28 April 2022 but it was again delayed and moved to the current date to avoid clash with Acharya.

The film's pre-release theatrical business stood at ₹72 crore, and needs a worldwide gross over ₹130 crore in order to be a profitable venture.

=== Home media ===
The satellite rights of the film were sold to Zee Telugu while the digital distribution rights were acquired by Sony LIV and Netflix. F3 was made available for streaming from 22 July 2022 on Sony LIV and on Netflix.

== Reception ==
=== Critical response ===
F3 received generally favourable reviews from the critics with praise for the cast and direction.

Writing for Cinema Express, Murali Krishna Ch called F3 a "laugh-riot." Considering it an improvement over its predecessor, Krishna praised Anil Ravipudi's direction and performances, particularly Venkatesh and Tej. Echoing the same, Sangeetha Devi Dundoo of The Hindu stated: "the comedy franchise, though uneven, elicits ample laughter, and Venkatesh shines." Balakrishna Ganeshan of The News Minute gave the film a rating of 2.5/5 and wrote "'F3' does not have much of a plot but a series of comedy events keeps the audience engaged".

Neeshitha Nyayapati of The Times of India gave the film a rating of 2.5/5 and compared F3 with the Golmaal franchise, terming it: "loud, messy, sometimes funny". In his review for Deccan Herald, Karthik Keramalu, opined it's a "half-hearted comedy" which Ravipudi got partly correct while praising the comic timing of the lead actors.

Firstpost reviewer Sankeertana Varma criticized the film's logic and story, calling it a "laughable attempt at comedy and entertainment." Manoj Kumar R of The Indian Express gave the film a rating of 1/5 and wrote "Anil is really scraping the bottom of the barrel with the Venkatesh, Varun Tej starrer. His attempts at comedy lack both sincerity and originality".

=== Box office ===
F3 grossed ₹23 crore (US$2.5 million) worldwide on its opening day, including ₹17 crore (US$1.8 million) from the states of Andhra Pradesh and Telangana. The opening day share of Andhra Pradesh and Telangana together stood at ₹10.37 crore (US$1.1 million). The film grossed ₹58.08 crore (US$6.2 million) in its opening weekend. In its first week, the film grossed ₹80.4 crore (US$8.6 million), with a distributor's share of ₹48.17 crore (US$5.1 million). After theatrical run ends, the film's total gross collection stood at ₹134 crore (US$14 million) worldwide.
