= Dil Raju =

Indian film producer and distributor

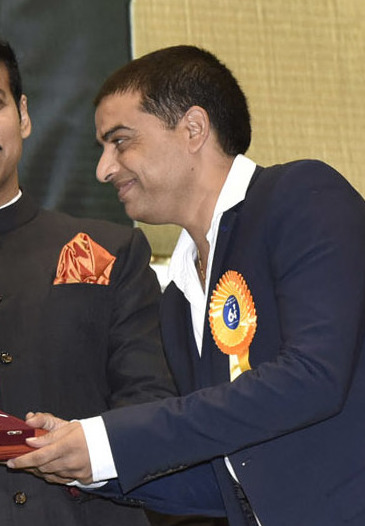
- Raju receiving the National Film Award in 2017

Chairman of the Telangana Film Development Corporation (TFDC)
- Incumbent
- Assumed office 3 December 2024–present
- Preceded by: Anil Kurmachalam

Personal details
- Born: Velamakucha Venkat Ramana Reddy; 18 December 1970 (age 55) Nizamabad, Telangana, India
- Spouses: Anitha (died 2017) Vygha Reddy (m. 2020)
- Children: 2
- Occupation: Film producer; Film distributor

Velamakucha Venkata Ramana Reddy (born 18 December 1970), known professionally as Dil Raju, is an Indian film producer and distributor, who is known for his work in Telugu cinema. He has also financed some Tamil and Hindi films and owns the production company Sri Venkateswara Creations. Raju has won two National Film Awards and was honoured with the Nagi Reddy–Chakrapani National Award in 2013 for his contributions to popular cinema.

Dil Raju was appointed as Chairman for Telangana Film Development Corporation (TGFDC) on 3 December 2024 by Telangana Government.

== Early life and career ==
Dil Raju was born in Narsingpalli in Nizamabad district of present-day Telangana. He was educated in Mudakpally and Nizamabad, and was interested in films from a young age. He later moved to Hyderabad and did automobile business with his brothers. He ventured into film distribution in the 1990s with the film Pelli Pandiri (1997) and started Sri Venkateswara Film Distributors in 1998.

== Personal life ==
Raju married Anita and has a daughter, Hanshitha Reddy. Anita died on 11 March 2017 due to cardiac arrest. Raju later married Tejaswini in 2020. Tejaswini's name was changed to Vygha Reddy following her marriage as per astrology. They have a son born in 2022.

== Filmography ==
=== As producer ===
Year	Film	Director	Notes
2003	Dil	V. V. Vinayak	Co-production with Giri
2004	Arya	Sukumar	
2005	Bhadra	Boyapati Srinu	
2006	Bommarillu	Bhaskar	
2007	Munna	Vamsi Paidipally	
2008	Parugu	Bhaskar	
2008	Kotha Bangaru Lokam	Srikanth Addala	
2009	Josh	Vasu Varma	
2010	Maro Charitra	Ravi Yadav	In Collaboration with Matinee Entertainments
2010	Rama Rama Krishna Krishna	Sriwass	
2010	Brindavanam	Vamsi Paidipally	
2011	Gaganam	Radha Mohan	In Collaboration with Matinee Entertainments; Simultaneously shot in Tamil as Payanam
2011	Mr. Perfect	Dasaradh	
2011	Oh My Friend	Venu Sriram	
2013	Seethamma Vakitlo Sirimalle Chettu	Srikanth Addala	
2013	Ramayya Vasthavayya	Harish Shankar	
2014	Yevadu	Vamsi Paidipally	
2014	Pilla Nuvvu Leni Jeevitam	A. S. Ravi Kumar Chowdary	In collaboration with Geetha Arts
2015	Kerintha	Sai Kiran Adivi	
2015	Subramanyam for Sale	Harish Shankar	
2016	Krishnastami	Vasu Varma	
2016	Supreme	Anil Ravipudi	
2017	Sathamanam Bhavati	Satish Vegesna	
2017	Nenu Local	Trinadha Rao Nakkina	
2017	DJ: Duvvada Jagannadham	Harish Shankar	
2017	Fidaa	Sekhar Kammula	
2017	Raja The Great	Anil Ravipudi	
2017	Middle Class Abbayi	Venu Sriram	
2018	Lover	Anish R. Krishna	
2018	Srinivasa Kalyanam	Satish Vegesna	
2018	Hello Guru Prema Kosame	Trinadha Rao Nakkina	
2019	F2	Anil Ravipudi	
2019	Maharshi	Vamshi Paidipally	In collaboration with Vyjayanthi Movies and PVP Cinema
2019	Iddari Lokam Okate	G. R. Krishna	
2020	Jaanu	C. Prem Kumar	
2020	V	Mohana Krishna Indraganti	
2021	Shaadi Mubarak	Padmasri	In collaboration with Srinivas Reddy
2021	Vakeel Saab	Venu Sriram	In collaboration with Boney Kapoor
2021	Paagal	Naresh Kuppili	In collaboration with Bekkem Venugopal of Lucky Media
2021	Nootokka Jillala Andagadu	Rachakonda Vidyasagar	In collaboration with Krish's First Frame Entertainments
2021	Ori Devuda	Ashwath Marimuthu	In collaboration with PVP Cinema
2022	Rowdy Boys	Sree Harsha Konuganti	
2022	Jersey	Gowtam Tinnanuri	Debut in Hindi cinema In collaboration with Allu Aravind, Suryadevara Nagavamsi, and Aman Gill
2022	F3	Anil Ravipudi	
2022	HIT: The First Case	Sailesh Kolanu	Hindi film
2022	Thank You	Vikram Kumar	
2023	Balagam	Venu Yeldandi	
2023	Varisu	Vamsi Paidipally	Tamil film
2023	Shaakuntalam	Gunasekhar	In collaboration with Guna Team Works
2024	The Family Star	Parasuram	
2025	Game Changer	Shankar	
2025	Sankranthiki Vasthunam	Anil Ravipudi	
2025	Thammudu	Venu Sriram	
2027	Rowdy Janardhana †	Ravi Kiran Kola	

=== As presenter ===
Year	Film	Notes
2009	Akasamantha	Telugu version of Prakash Raj's Abhiyum Naanum
2012	Tuneega Tuneega	In collaboration with Maganti Ramji of Padmini Arts banner
2017	Jawaan	In collaboration with Arunachal Creations' Krishna
2019	Aaviri	In collaboration with Ravi Babu's Flying Frogs
2020	Sarileru Neekevvaru	In collaboration with AK Entertainments and GMB Entertainment
2022	Good Luck Sakhi	In collaboration with Sudheer Chandra Padiri's Worth A Shot Motion Arts
2027	SVC 63	Produced by Shirish and Kuldeep Rathore

Dubbed films

Year	Film	Notes
2002	Amrutha	In collaboration with Giri
2012	Snehithudu	Remake of 3 Idiots
2015	Ok Bangaram	
2016	Police	
2016	Remo	
2017	Cheliyaa	
2022	Ponniyin Selvan: Part One	
2022	Love Today	
2023	Ponniyin Selvan: Part Two	

== Awards ==
National Film Awards

- Best Popular Film Providing Wholesome Entertainment – Golden Lotus (producer) – Sathamanam Bhavati – (2016)
- Best Popular Film Providing Wholesome Entertainment – Golden Lotus (producer) – Maharshi – (2019)

Gaddar Awards

- Best Feature Film (Gold) - Sathamanam Bhavati (2016)
- Best Feature Film (Gold) - Maharshi (2019)
- Best Feature Film (Silver) - Fidaa (2017)

Nandi Awards

- Best Feature Film (Gold) – Bommarillu (2006)
- Best Feature Film (Bronze) – Parugu (2008)
- Akkineni Award for Best Home-viewing Feature Film – Seethamma Vakitlo Sirimalle Chettu (2013)
- Nagi Reddy-Chakrapani National Award for contributions to popular cinema – (2013)

Filmfare Awards South

- Filmfare Award for Best Film – Telugu – Bommarillu (2006)

Santosham Film Awards

- Santosham D. Ramanaidu Smarakam Award (2019)

Other Awards

- Nagi Reddy Memorial Award for the Best Telugu Family Entertainer of the year 2011 – Mr. Perfect
