= Sarileru Neekevvaru =

2020 Indian film by Anil Ravipudi

- Theatrical release poster
- Directed by: Anil Ravipudi
- Written by: Anil Ravipudi
- Produced by: Mahesh Babu; Dil Raju; Rambrahmam Sunkara
- Starring: Mahesh Babu; Vijayashanti; Rashmika Mandanna; Prakash Raj; Rajendra Prasad
- Cinematography: R. Rathnavelu
- Edited by: Tammiraju
- Music by: Devi Sri Prasad
- Production companies: Sri Venkateswara Creations; G. Mahesh Babu Entertainment; AK Entertainments
- Distributed by: AK Entertainments
- Release date: 11 January 2020
- Running time: 169 minutes
- Country: India
- Language: Telugu
- Budget: ₹75 crore
- Box office: ₹260 crore

Sarileru Neekevvaru (transl. Nobody can match you) is a 2020 Indian Telugu-language action comedy film written and directed by Anil Ravipudi and produced by Sri Venkateswara Creations, G. Mahesh Babu Entertainment and AK Entertainments. The film stars Mahesh Babu, Vijayashanti, Rashmika Mandanna, Prakash Raj and Rajendra Prasad along with a special appearance by Tamannaah. The music was composed by Devi Sri Prasad, while R. Rathnavelu and Tammiraju handled the cinematography and editing respectively.

Sarileru Neekevvaru was theatrically released worldwide on 11 January 2020 and received mixed-to-positive reviews from critics. The film, produced with a budget of ₹75 crore, grossed ₹260 crore at the box office and became the second highest-grossing Telugu film of 2020, the fourth highest grossing Telugu film at the time of its release and the highest-grossing film of Babu surpassing Bharat Ane Nenu and Maharshi.

== Plot ==
Bharathi is a medical college professor. She lives with her elder daughter-in-law, daughter and an adoptive daughter. Her elder son was an army martyr while her younger son is a Captain in the Indian Army. She calls her son to come for the arrangements for her daughter's wedding. The scene then shifts to Ajay Krishna who is a Major in the Para SF where Bharathi's son who is also named Ajay is also a member of the regiment. During a shootout in a rescue operation, Ajay gets severely injured. General Murali Sharma sends Ajay Krishna and his colleague Captain Prasad to inform the news to Ajay's family after the wedding thus ensuring that the preparations are not disturbed. On the way to Kurnool on a train, they come across Samskruthi, who is an irritating-comic girl. Samskruthi sees Ajay Krishna and falls in love with him. She tries to impress Ajay unusually but to no avail.

Once Ajay Krishna and Prasad reach Kurnool, they find Bharathi's house empty. Eventually, they find that she and her family went into hiding to escape from MLA Nagendra. When they are caught by Nagendra's men who threaten to kill them, Ajay Krishna arrives and battles with the men with a warning that he would deal with Nagendra in the same way. Nagendra's main henchman narrates this to Nagendra. Meanwhile, Bharathi reveals to Ajay Krishna that she had lodged a case against Nagendra for planning the murder of her cousin, which was covered up as a suicide. When Nagendra threatens her to withdraw the case, she stood her ground. Consequently, Bharathi is suspended from the college on the allegation of leaking the exam paper and her daughter's marriage gets called off. Ajay Krishna, along with Bharathi leaves for Nagendra's house and challenges him, stating that he will change him into a responsible citizen, by making him surrender after fetching all the evidence.

Ajay Krishna re-arranges Bharathi's daughter's marriage with the same person after convincing her in-laws. He also rescues a government officer Ramakrishna from goons in a forest and later learns from him that Nagendra has been involved in a scam, who along with a bank officer who is Bharathi's cousin, Ramakrishna tried to uncover the scam with the help of a techie, who works in Nagendra Technologies (which is founded by Nagendra and is running his scams). Nagendra found out about this and got the bank officer and the techie killed while getting Ramakrishna held captive in a forest. Ajay Krishna then confronts Nagendra's party members and explains about the scams committed by numerous politicians and threatens the party members from protecting Nagendra who the party members eventually throw him out of the party.

Finally, Bharathi's daughter's marriage takes place while Ajay is declared dead, and Ajay Krishna informs the family after the wedding. After performing his last rites, Ajay Krishna and Prasad decide to return to Kashmir, while Ajay Krishna also accepts Samskruthi's proposal in between. Despite gathering the evidence, Ajay Krishna spares Nagendra from being jailed as he might use sympathy to leave prison and resume his corrupt activities. Instead, Ajay Krishna tells Nagendra that he is appointed to the Indian Army so that he will be disciplined and lead an honest life thereafter. Three months later, Nagendra is a reformed leader who believes in discipline and respects everyone, and Ajay Krishna marrying Samskruthi.

== Cast ==
- Mahesh Babu as Major Ajay Krishna (Para SF),Bharathi's adopted son
- Vijayashanti as Bharathi, Kurnool medical college professor and captain Ajay's mother
- Rashmika Mandanna as Samskruthi, Ajay's love interest
- Prakash Raj as MLA Yeddula Nagendra, A corrupt minister
- Rajendra Prasad as Captain Shiva Prasad, Ajay's colleague
- Rao Ramesh as Raghava, Samskruthi’s father
- Sangeetha Krish as Swarajyam, Samskruthi's mother
- Murali Sharma as General, Ajay’s brigader
- Posani Krishna Murali as Inspector Krupanandam
- Gautham Raju as Raghava’s brother-in-law
- Satyadev as Captain Ajay, Bharathi's son
- Brahmaji as Adv. Mrudanga Rao
- Tanikella Bharani as minister, Ajay’s government
- Jaya Prakash Reddy as Nagendra's father
- Ajay as Basava, Nagendra's henchman
- Raghu Babu as Teacher Tirupati Rao, Nagendra's sidekick
- Subbaraju as Crime Branch Koti
- Vennela Kishore as Kishore, Koti's assistant
- Rajeev Kanakala as Ramakrishna, a government officer
- Bandla Ganesh as Ganesh
- Surya as Bharathi's uncle
- Satya as Samskruthi's prospective groom
- Hari Teja as Swechcha, Samskruthi's sister
- Rajitha as Samskruthi's prospective groom's mother
- Rupa Lakshmi
- Ashwini Chandrashekar as Swathanthra, Samskruthi’s sister
- Baby Krithika as Gayatri, Bharathi's Adopted Daughter

Cameo appearance

- Tamannaah Bhatia cameo in the item song "Daang Daang"
- Devi Sri Prasad in the song "Mind Block"
- Sekhar in the song "Mind Block"
- Anil Ravipudi in end credits
- Rambrahmam Sunkara in end credits

== Production ==
=== Development ===
In mid February 2019, it was reported that Mahesh Babu, who was working on Maharshi (2019) at the time, was reported to collaborate with Anil Ravipudi for his next film after Maharshi. A few days later, sources claimed that the venture would be produced by Dil Raju and Anil Sunkara under Sri Venkateswara Creations. Filming to reportedly commence in May that year, the team were finalizing cast and crew and scouting for filming locations the same month. On 31 May, Dil Raju and Ramabrahmam Sunkara of Sri Venkateswara Creations and Mahesh Babu himself of GMB Entertainment publicly announced the venture, as they were producing it. The title of the film and release date were revealed the same day.

=== Casting ===
In early March 2019, Sai Pallavi was reported to be in consideration for the lead actress role. Few days later, Rashmika Mandanna was reported to have been approached for the role. On 31 May that year, Mandanna and Vijayashanti were announced being part of the cast. The former was signed to pair opposite Babu for the first time, while the latter was signed for crucial role, marking her comeback to film industry after 13 years. Tamannaah Bhatia was signed in for a party song. The film also marks the comeback of Sangeetha Krish and Bandla Ganesh into movies after many years.

=== Filming ===
The first schedule was shot in Kashmir from 5 to 20 July 2019. For the second schedule, a replica set of Konda Reddy Buruju was constructed in Ramoji Film City with an estimated cost of ₹4 crore The railway station scenes in this film were shot at Muthalamada Railway Station in Palakkad district, Kerala. On 8 November 2019, with the Muthalamada Railway Station schedule, the talkie part of the film wrapped up.

== Music ==
Sarileru Neekevvaru

Soundtrack album by Devi Sri Prasad
- Released: 5 January 2020
- Recorded: 2019
- Studio: Brindavan – The Garden Of Music
- Genre: Feature film soundtrack
- Length: 21:06
- Language: Telugu
- Labels: Lahari Music; T-Series
- Producer: Devi Sri Prasad

Devi Sri Prasad chronology
Maharshi (2019)	Sarileru Neekevvaru (2020)	Alludu Adhurs (2021)
External audio
- Official Audio Jukebox on YouTube

The music is composed by Devi Sri Prasad, collaborating with Mahesh Babu for the fifth time and with Anil Ravipudi for the second time after F2: Fun and Frustration. The lyrics were written by Devi Sri Prasad, Sri Mani and Ramajogayya Sastry. Composer Devi worked with a special orchestra in Europe for recording the film's soundtrack and score. The makers announced that the film features five songs and all of them will be released as singles, on five consecutive Mondays of the December month. The hashtag #MassMBMondays was trending on social media.

The first single track titled "Mind Block" was released on 2 December 2019, which was sung by Ranina Reddy with Blaaze singing the rap versions. Devi recorded this song while he was recording two other songs for his upcoming two films, on the same day. The second single track "Suryudivo Chandrudivo" was released on 9 December 2019, which was rendered by B Praak. The song resembles numbers, like "Idhe Kadha Nee Katha" from Maharshi (2019) and "Srimanthuda" from Srimanthudu (2015), which were composed by Devi Sri Prasad. The lyrics talk about the protagonist's kindness and greatness. The third single track "He's So Cute" was released on 16 December 2019, which was sung by Madhu Priya. It is termed as a teasing-romantic number. The fourth single "Sarileru Neekkevvaru Anthem" was released on 23 December 2019. Sung by Shankar Mahadevan, it features an orchestra from Europe, which recorded the film's score. The fifth single track "Daang Daang" was released on 30 December 2019, which was sung by Nakash Aziz and Lavita Lobo. The full album was released on 5 January 2020.

Telugu Track list
No.	Title	Lyrics	Singer(s)	Length
1.	"Mind Block"	Sri Mani, Devi Sri Prasad	Blaaze, Ranina Reddy	4:23
2.	"Suryudivo Chandrudivo"	Ramajogayya Sastry	B Praak	4:32
3.	"He's So Cute"	Sri Mani	Madhu Priya	3:30
4.	"Sarileru Neekevvaru Anthem"	Devi Sri Prasad	Shankar Mahadevan	4:27
5.	"Daang Daang"	Ramajogayya Sastry	Nakash Aziz, Lavita Lobo	4:14
Total length:				21:06

Sarileru (Hindi)
No.	Title	Lyrics	Singer(s)	Length
1.	"He's So Cute"	Vaibhav Joshi, Raqueeb Alam	Gul Saxena	3:30
2.	"Veer Tu Ranveer Tu"	Vaibhav Joshi, Raqueeb Alam	Rahul Ram	1:48
3.	"Daang Daang"	Vaibhav Joshi, Raqueeb Alam	Nakash Aziz, Lavita Lobo	3:29

Major Ajay Krishna (Kannada)
No.	Title	Lyrics	Singer(s)	Length
1.	"Mind Block"	V. Nagendra Prasad	Vinay KN, Shashikala Sunil, Devi Sri Prasad	3:55
2.	"Nesarano Chandirano"	V. Nagendra Prasad	Karibasava Tadakal	2:57
3.	"He's So Cute"	V. Nagendra Prasad	Vedika, Devi Sri Prasad	3:30
4.	"Sarileru neekevaaru title song"	V. Nagendra Prasad	Harsha	1:48
5.	"Daang Daang"	V. Nagendra Prasad	Vinay KN, Shashikala Sunil	3:29

Ivanukku Sariyana Aal Illai (Tamil)
No.	Title	Length
1.	"Mind Block"	3:57
2.	"Suriyano Chandirano"	3:23
3.	"He’s so cute"	3:38
4.	"Pada Pada Vendru"	1:56
5.	"Daang Daang"	3:35

== Release ==
=== Home media ===
The satellite rights of the film were sold to Gemini TV, which premiered it on 25 March 2020 for the first time on eve of Ugadi and in its first Television premier movie recorded a TRP of 23.4. The film's digital rights were acquired by Amazon Prime Video and made available for streaming since 1 March 2020.

=== Dubbed versions ===
The film was dubbed and released in Tamil as Ivanukku Sariyana Aal Illai in 2020. The Tamil version was released across 200 plus theaters in Tamil Nadu. The film was also dubbed and released in Kannada as Major Ajay Krishna and in Malayalam as Krishnan.

== Reception ==
=== Critical reception ===
==== India ====
The Times of India critic Neeshita Nyayapati, rated the film 3/5 stars and stated, "Sarileru Neekevvaru definitely has its moments but Anil Ravipudi’s bloated narrative that tries too hard." On performances, Nyayapati noted that Babu did a "good job of playing a man who will serve the country, crack jokes and protect," while also appreciating Vijayashanthi's role. She felt that DSP's music was "okay" and action by Ram-Lakshman was "engaging", but Ratnavelu's cinematography was "unfortunately overshadowed by subpar VFX shots.". Jeevi of Idlebrain rated the film 3/5 stars, praising Mahesh Babu's entertaining performance and charisma despite the weak storyline. The highlights include Mahesh Babu, entertainment, and commercial elements, but the second half is slow and goes off track.

First post editor Hemanth Kumar rated the film 3.25/5 stars and stated: "Mahesh Babu hits it out of the park in Anil Ravipudi's fine blend of heroism and comedy." In a review for The Indian Express, Manoj Kumar rated the film 3.5/5 stars and wrote "Mahesh Babu shines in mind bending popcorn fare." Sify gave the film 3/5 and called it "a commercial action-entertainer." Sangeetha Devi of The Hindu wrote "Mahesh Babu's film is a partly entertaining mixed bag." A reviewer of The Hans India rated the film 3/5 stars and wrote, "The movie will be like an eye feast for the audience who have been waiting to see Mahesh Babu in a complete entertaining role". Mirchi9 rated Overall, Sarileru Neekevvaru is an easy one-time watch for lovers of mass entertainers with action and comedy. If one likes the star but don't like the ‘comedy’, it becomes a decent one-time at best. If one is looking for something more, they would be partly disappointed as content-wise there is nothing new. Telugu360 rated the movie with 3/5 and mentioned Sarileru Neekevvaru is an engaging commercial entertainer, and Mahesh Babu excelled in it. Director Anil Ravipudi presented Mahesh Babu in a never before mass avatar which will make fans go berserk for sure. First half is good, halfway through the second half this movie loses its steam a bit, but the last song and easy climax bring the proceedings back on track. It is a family friendly movie with no vulgarity or violence just entertainment.

=== Box office ===
On its opening day, Sarileru Neekevvaru collected ₹46.77 crore worldwide. Within three days, the film grossed ₹103 crore, and within 10 days, it reached ₹200 crore. After a box office run of 50 days, the film grossed over ₹260 crore worldwide, becoming one of the highest-grossing Telugu films.

==== Domestic ====
In the Telugu-speaking states of Andhra Pradesh and Telangana, the film collected a share of ₹32.77 crore on the opening day and amassed over ₹100 crore in 10 days.

==== Overseas ====
On the opening day movie collected A$237 thousand in Australia, NZ$20.75 thousand in New Zealand and £55.23 thousand in United Kingdom and in two days the movie collected $1.31 million in United States of America. In three days the movie collected CA$6.45 thousand from Canada, $1.63 million from USA and £70.69 thousand from UK. In nine days the movie collected $2 million from USA, A$349.25 thousand from Australia £96.22 thousand from UK and NZ$35.57 thousand from New Zealand. And it crossed over $2.3 million in United States and marked as 3rd film to collect $2 million in Mahesh Babu's career after Srimanthudu and Bharat Ane Nenu.

== Accolades ==
Award (Note: Awards, festivals and organizations are in alphabetical order.)	Date of ceremony (Note: Date is linked to the article about the awards held that year, wherever possible.)	Category	Recipient(s)	Result	Ref.
Filmfare Awards South	9 October 2022	Best Actor – Telugu	Mahesh Babu	Nominated	
Filmfare Awards South	9 October 2022	Best Supporting Actress – Telugu	Vijayashanti	Nominated	
Filmfare Awards South	9 October 2022	Best Music Director – Telugu	Devi Sri Prasad	Nominated	
Filmfare Awards South	9 October 2022	Best Female Playback Singer – Telugu	Madhu Priya – (for song "He's So Cute")	Nominated	
South Indian International Movie Awards	19 September 2021	Best Film – Telugu	AK Entertainments, G. Mahesh Babu Entertainment, Sri Venkateswara Creations	Nominated	
South Indian International Movie Awards	19 September 2021	Best Director – Telugu	Anil Ravipudi	Nominated	
South Indian International Movie Awards	19 September 2021	Best Actor – Telugu	Mahesh Babu	Nominated	
South Indian International Movie Awards	19 September 2021	Best Actress – Telugu	Rashmika Mandanna	Nominated	
South Indian International Movie Awards	19 September 2021	Best Supporting Actor – Telugu	Rajendra Prasad	Nominated	
South Indian International Movie Awards	19 September 2021	Best Supporting Actress – Telugu	Vijayashanti	Nominated	
South Indian International Movie Awards	19 September 2021	Best Actor in a Negative Role – Telugu	Prakash Raj	Nominated	
South Indian International Movie Awards	19 September 2021	Best Music Director – Telugu	Devi Sri Prasad	Nominated	
South Indian International Movie Awards	19 September 2021	Best Lyricist – Telugu	Devi Sri Prasad – (for song "Sarileru Neekevvaru Anthem")	Nominated	
South Indian International Movie Awards	19 September 2021	Best Male Playback Singer – Telugu	Shankar Mahadevan – (for song "Sarileru Neekevvaru Anthem")	Nominated	
South Indian International Movie Awards	19 September 2021	Best Female Playback Singer – Telugu	Madhu Priya – (for song "He's So Cute")	Won	
South Indian International Movie Awards	19 September 2021	Best Cinematographer – Telugu	R. Rathnavelu	Won	
