= Vasu Varma =

Indian film director

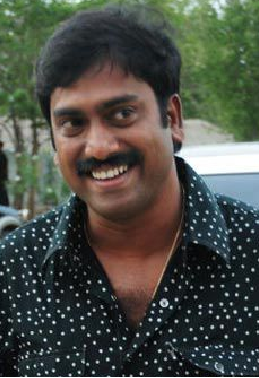
Varma in 2009

Vasu Varma is an Indian film director who works in Telugu cinema.

== Career ==
Vasu started his career as an apprentice in direction for the movie Sakutumba Saparivaara Sametam directed by S.V.Krishna Reddy. Later, he started assisting V. V. Vinayak from his first film Aadhi as an Associate Director and later became a co-director. Right from the first movie of Dil Raju Productions Dil, Varma has given his support and acted as a backbone to Dil Raju's direction department and has continued to do so. In 2009, Dil Raju gave the first direction opportunity to Varma, to launch a Naga Chaitanya (son of Nagarjuna) in Josh. He also launched another Karthika Nair (daughter of yesteryears star actress Radha) in the same movie. With Josh, he became one of the rare directors who launched two star kids in one movie.

After Josh, Varma got another chance from Raju for his second movie, Krishnashtami.

== Filmography ==
List of film credits
Year	Title	Role
2002	Aadhi	Associate director
2003	Dil	Chief Associate Director
2004	Samba	Co-director
2005	Bunny	Co-director
2006	Bommarillu	Script Consultant
2008	Parugu	Script Consultant
2009	Josh	Story, Screenplay, Dialogues, Direction
2010	Brindavanam	Script Consultant
2016	Krishnashtami	Screenplay, Dialogues, Direction
2017	Katamarayudu	Screenplay
2024	The Family Star	Creative producer
