= Bhagyanagara Veedhullo Gammattu =

- Theatrical release poster
- Directed by: Srinivasa Reddy
- Written by: Param Suryanshu
- Produced by: Srinivasa Reddy; Vennela Kishore; Satyam Rajesh; Saptagiri; Dhanraj; Venu Yeldandi; Praveen; Thagubothu Ramesh
- Starring: Srinivasa Reddy; Satya; Shakalaka Shankar
- Music by: Saketh Komanduri
- Production company: Flying Colours Entertainment
- Release date: 6 December 2019
- Country: India
- Language: Telugu

Bhagyanagara Veedhullo Gammattu (transl. Amusement in the streets of Bhagyanagaram) is a 2019 Indian Telugu-language comedy drama film directed and co-produced by Srinivasa Reddy in his directorial debut. The film stars himself and comedians Satya and Shakalaka Shankar. The film was not commercially successful.

== Plot ==
The film follows three aspiring filmmakers (Srinu, Jojo, and Peter) who get caught up in a drug mafia.

== Cast ==
- Srinivasa Reddy as Srinu
- Satya as Jojo
- Shakalaka Shankar as Peter
- Vennela Kishore as a police officer
- Dolly Shah
- Satyam Rajesh
- Viva Harsha
- Chitram Srinu
- Hyper Aadi as Mahesh
- Praveen
- Jhansi as Batuku Edla Bandi anchor
- Suman Shetty
- Raghu Babu
- Racha Ravi
- Getup Srinu as Assistant Beggar
- Bhadra
- Chammak Chandra
- Ananth Babu

== Production ==
Popular comedian Srinivasa Reddy makes his directorial debut with this film. The first look was revealed on 28 September 2019. The film's opening shot featured Srinivasa Reddy's father, Yaramala Rami Reddy, who also played an important character in the film.

== Soundtrack ==
Music was composed by Saketh Komanduri.

- "Vethiki Vethiki" - Dinker Kalvala
- "Hip Hop" - Saketh, Deepu, Sri Krishna
- "Prema Rojuke Banthi" - Rahul Sipligunj, Harika Narayan

== Reception ==
A critic from The Times of India gave the film one-and-a-half out of five stars and wrote, "Most of the characters in the film come and go as they please, making the film an avoidable fare".
