= Krishnashtami =

- Theatrical release poster
- Directed by: Vasu Varma
- Produced by: Dil Raju
- Starring: Sunil; Nikki Galrani
- Cinematography: Chota K. Naidu
- Edited by: Gautham Raju
- Music by: Dinesh
- Production company: Sri Venkateswara Creations
- Release date: 19 February 2016
- Running time: 160 min
- Country: India
- Language: Telugu

Krishnashtami is a 2016 Indian Telugu-language film written and directed by Vasu Varma, cinematography by Chota K. Naidu, and produced by Dil Raju under Sri Venkateswara Creations. It features Sunil, Nikki Galrani and Dimple Chopade in the lead roles.

The film was released worldwide on 19 February 2016.

== Cast ==
- Sunil as Krishna Vara Prasad
- Nikki Galrani as Pallavi
- Dimple Chopade as Priya
- Mukesh Rishi as Raghupati
- Ashutosh Rana
- Saptagiri
- Pavitra Lokesh
- Brahmanandam
- Tulasi
- Posani Krishna Murali
- Sivannarayana Naripeddi
- Tejaswi Madivada
- Harsha Chemudu

== Music ==
The audio songs of this movie, along with a trailer was released in the "Maitri" annual festivities conducted at the Godavari Institute of Engineering and Technology.

| Song | Singers |
|---|---|
| "Gokula Thilaka" | Revanth |
| "Love Is True" | Adnan Sami |
| "Bava Bava Panneeru" | Dhanunjay, Ramya Behara |
| "Nuvvu Nenu Anthe" | Vijay Prakash, Ramya Behara |
| "Krishnashtami" | Revanth, Noel Sean, Rohit Paritala |
| "Lefto Punjabi Dressu" | Divya Kumar, Mamta Sharma |

== Reception ==
A critic from Deccan Chronicle wrote that "Krishnashtami has a reasonable plot, but is let down by lazy execution and insipid performances".

== Box office ==
=== Domestic ===
Krishnashtami grossed ₹3.5 crore on the opening day at AP/Telangana box office making second best opener for Sunil after Maryada Ramanna. The film grossed ₹6 crore in its opening weekend.

=== Overseas ===
Krishnashtami collected $29,382 at the US box office in its first weekend.
