= Ari: My Name Is Nobody =

2025 Indian Telugu film by Jayashankarr

- Theatrical release poster
- Directed by: Jayashankarr
- Written by: Jayashankarr
- Produced by: Srinivas Reddy Ramireddy; Thimmappa Naidu Purimetla; D. Seshu Maramreddy
- Starring: P. Sai Kumar; Subhalekha Sudhakar; Anasuya Bharadwaj; Srikanth Iyengar; Harsha Chemudu; Surabhi Prabhavathi; Vinod Varma; Surya Purimetla
- Cinematography: G. Krishna Prasad
- Edited by: G. Avinash
- Music by: Anup Rubens
- Production companies: Arvy Cinemas; Sree Cinema Studios
- Release date: 10 October 2025
- Running time: 112 minutes
- Country: India
- Language: Telugu

Ari: My Name Is Nobody is a 2025 Indian Telugu-language fantasy drama film written and directed by Jayashankarr. The film has an ensemble cast including P. Sai Kumar, Subhalekha Sudhakar, Anasuya Bharadwaj, Srikanth Iyengar, Harsha Chemudu, Surabhi Prabhavathi, Vinod Varma and Surya Purimetla.

The film was released on 10 October 2025.

== Cast ==
- P. Sai Kumar as Vipra Narayana Paswan
- Subhalekha Sudhakar as Gunjan
- Anasuya Bharadwaj as Athreyi
- Srikanth Iyengar as Chaitanya
- Harsha Chemudu as Amul Kumar
- Surabhi Prabhavathi as Lakshmi
- Vinod Varma as Krishna
- Surya Purimetla as Surya
- Aamani
- Chammak Chandra
- Suman
- Srinivasa Reddy
- Ridhima Pandit
- Pavani Reddy
- Keshav Deepak
- Saddam Hussain

== Music ==
The background score and songs were composed by Anup Rubens.

Track listing
No.	Title	Lyrics	Singer(s)	Length
1.	"Chinnari Kittayya"	Kasarla Shyam	Mangli	5:01
2.	"Bhaga Bhaga"	Vanamali	Shanmukha Priya, P V N S Rohit	3:38
3.	"Theme Of Ari"	Kasarla Shyam	Chorus	1:55
4.	"Idi Gamanam, Idi Savanam"	Kalyan Chakravarthy	Chorus	2:46
5.	"Let’S Do Some Crazy Party"	Purnachary Challury	Sublahshini, Anup Rubens	3:29

== Release and reception ==
Ari: My Name Is Nobody was released on 10 October 2025.

Satya Pulagam of ABP Desam rated the film 2.75 out of 5 and appreciated the performances, and story while opining that the screenplay, and technical values are weak. Eenadu also echoed the same in their review.
