= Srinivasa Reddy =

Indian actor, film producer and director

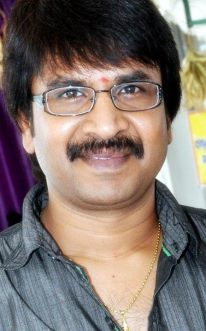
- Born: Yaramala Srinivasa Reddy; 16 November 1973 (age 52); Khammam, Andhra Pradesh, India (now Telangana, India)
- Occupations: Actor; comedian
- Years active: 1995 - present

Yaramala Srinivasa Reddy is an Indian actor known for his work in Telugu cinema. He started his career as a television anchor, hosting comedy shows, and later moved into films. He made his acting debut with Ishtam (2001) and gained popularity with his comic role in Idiot (2002), where his "Boost" dialogue became widely recognized.

He went on to become a well-known comedian, appearing in over 100 films. Some of his notable works include Venky (2004), Desamuduru (2007), Parugu (2008), Bendu Apparao RMP (2009), Anjaneyulu (2009), Darling (2010), Solo (2011), Pataas (2015), and Raja the Great (2017).

In addition to supporting roles, he also played lead roles in films like Geethanjali (2014) and Jayammu Nischayammu Ra (2016), both of which received critical appreciation.

In 2019, Srinivasa Reddy made his directorial debut with the comedy film Bhagyanagara Veedhullo Gammattu, which he also produced under his own production banner.

== Early life ==
Srinivasa Reddy was born in Chinakorukondi, a village in Kalluru Mandal of Khammam district, Andhra Pradesh (now in Telangana). He was the youngest of four siblings born to Yaramala Rami Reddy, a Village Development Officer (V.D.O.) and stage actor, and Venkataravamma. His father’s involvement in theatre influenced Srinivasa Reddy’s early exposure to the performing arts.

During his childhood, he was inspired by cinematic icons like Charlie Chaplin, N. T. Rama Rao, and Chiranjeevi. Known for his talent in storytelling, he would narrate film plots to his peers and mimic dance routines inspired by N. T. Rama Rao. His school play performances earned him recognition and admiration.

While pursuing intermediate education, he became a mimicry artist, gaining popularity in Khammam district for imitating film stars such as Amitabh Bachchan. He later earned a B.Com degree in Khammam and won several accolades for his performances, including the title "Man of the University" at Gulbarga University.

== Career ==
After completing his degree, Srinivasa Reddy moved to Hyderabad around 1997 to pursue a career in the film industry. He initially appeared in television serials, including Chanakya on Doordarshan. However, his career was briefly interrupted by a road accident in 1998. After recovering, he gained prominence as an anchor for television shows such as Fun Tonic on Siti Cable and Navvu Navvinchu on Gemini TV. His exposure in these shows helped him connect with director Puri Jagannadh, thanks to an introduction by Raghu Kunche and Jr. Relangi.

Srinivasa Reddy made his acting debut in the film Ishtam (2001). His breakthrough came with Puri Jagannadh’s Idiot (2002), where he portrayed the friend of Ravi Teja’s character. His comedic performance and the iconic "Boost" dialogue, delivered while clad only in underwear, became a memorable moment in Telugu cinema. This role established him as a sought-after comedic actor.

Following his success in Idiot, Srinivasa Reddy appeared in several successful films, including Venky (2004), Desamuduru (2007), Lakshmi Kalyanam (2007), Parugu (2008), Bendu Apparao RMP (2009), Darling (2010), and Solo (2011). He became well known for portraying the protagonist's friend or a supporting character throughout these films. His humorous dialogues, such as "Ippudu kakapothe inkeppudu" (transl. "If not now, when?") in Pataas (2015) and "Uhu Hoo… Hoo…" in Raja the Great (2017), became widely popular. Srinivasa Reddy also worked as an assistant director for Raja the Great and as an associate director for Athili Sattibabu LKG (2007).

He frequently collaborated with actors like Brahmanandam and directors S. V. Krishna Reddy and E. V. V. Satyanarayana. While primarily known for his comedic roles, Srinivasa Reddy showcased his versatility in films such as Geethanjali (2014) and Jayammu Nischayammu Ra (2016), where he played the lead roles. In Jayammu Nischayammu Ra, he portrayed the role of the hero, an innocent and intelligent man who wins his love, earning him recognition for his shift from comedy to a more dramatic role.

In 2019, Srinivasa Reddy ventured into direction with Bhagyanagara Veedhullo Gammattu, which he also produced under his banner, Flying Colours Entertainment. However, the film did not achieve commercial success.

== Personal life ==
Srinivasa Reddy is married to Swathi Reddy, the daughter of his elder sister. The couple has two daughters, Aakruthi(2007),and Aasrithi(2017). Known for his strong connection to Telugu culture, Srinivasa Reddy values maintaining a balance between his professional commitments and family life.

His father, Yaramala Rami Reddy, played a key character in Bhagyanagara Veedhullo Gammattu, a film directed and produced by Srinivasa Reddy.

== Filmography ==
=== Films ===
- All films are in Telugu language unless otherwise noted

Year	Title	Role	Note
1997	Nayanamma		
2001	Ishtam	Ravi	
2001	Inspector Vikram		
2002	Idiot	Chanti's friend	
2003	Vijayam	Raju's friend	
2003	Kabeer Das		
2003	Naaga		
2003	Simhadri	Thief	
2004	Sorry Naaku Pallaindhi		
2004	Love Today		
2004	Venky	Suri Babu	
2004	143		
2004	Sakhiya	Hari's friend	
2005	Guru		
2005	Mr. Errababu		
2006	Oka `V` Chitram	Balaram's friend	
2006	Bangaram	Vinay's friend	
2006	Roommates	Seshu	
2007	Lakshmi Kalyanam	Gopalam	
2007	Yamadonga		
2007	Vijayadasami		
2007	Desamuduru	Ravi	
2007	Dubai Seenu	Seenu's friend	
2007	Dhee	Babloo's friend	
2007	Lakshyam	Blade Seenu	
2008	Parugu	Krishna's friend	
2008	Blade Babji	Krishna Manohar	
2008	Chintakayala Ravi	Giri	
2008	Ready	Raju Garu	
2008	King	Sai Kishore	
2009	Kasko	Vamsi's friend	
2009	Malli Malli		
2009	Jagadguru Sri Shiridi Saibaba		
2009	Bendu Apparao R.M.P	Tailor	
2009	Rathri		
2009	Arya 2		
2009	Pistha	Police officer	
2009	Kasko		
2009	Anjaneyulu	Anjaneyulu's colleague	
2010	Namo Venkatesa	Murthy	
2010	Darling	Prabha's friend	
2010	Comedy Express		
2010	Rama Rama Krishna Krishna	Jilani	
2011	Solo	Gautham's friend	
2011	Veera		
2011	Poison		
2011	Dookudu	Director	
2011	Kandireega	Sreenu's friend	
2012	Naan Ee	Sudeep's PA	
2012	Eega	Sudeep's PA	
2012	Rachcha	Raj's friend	
2012	Daruvu	Ravindra's assistant	
2012	Ishq	Siva's assistant	
2012	Sarocharu	Karthik's friend	
2012	Ayyare		
2013	Shadow	Psycho Srinu's student	
2013	Abbai Class Ammai Mass		
2013	Race		
2013	Balupu	Ravi's friend	
2013	Iddarammayilatho	Sanju's friend/musical gang member	
2013	Attarintiki Daredi	Baddam Bhaskar's assistant	
2013	Seethamma Vakitlo Sirimalle Chettu	Peddodu's friend	
2013	Sevakudu	Raju	
2013	Tadakha	Karthik's friend	
2014	Bhimavaram Bullodu	Yadagiri	
2014	Oka Laila Kosam	Kiran	
2014	Geethanjali	Srinivas / Sreenu	
2014	Race Gurram	Lucky's friend	
2014	1: Nenokkadine	Baasha's subordinate	
2014	Manam	Car broker	
2014	Boochamma Boochodu		
2015	Shivam	Ramakrishna	
2015	Bhale Bhale Magadivoy	Nandana's relative	
2015	Kick 2	Suribabu	
2015	Pataas	C.I. Reddy	
2016	Speedunnodu	Suri	
2016	Appatlo Okadundevadu	Srinu	
2016	Jayammu Nischayammu Raa	Sarva Mangalam "Sarvesh"	Lead role
2016	Premam	E. Kanaka Rao "EK"	
2016	A Aa	Gopal	
2016	Supreme	Musician Seenayya	
2017	Mister	Seenu	
2017	Two Countries	Bose	
2017	Balakrishnudu	Chitti Babu	
2017	Veedevadu		Telugu version
2017	Raja the Great	Bujji	
2017	Anando Brahma	Sidhu	
2018	Amar Akbar Anthony	Kandulu	
2018	Agnyaathavaasi	Abhi's assistant	
2018	Krishnarjuna Yudham	Bhasker	
2018	Aravinda Sametha Veera Raghava	Balu	
2018	Pantham	Vikranth's friend	
2018	Jamba Lakidi Pamba	Varun	Lead Role
2018	Chal Mohan Ranga		
2018	Veera Bhoga Vasantha Rayalu	Constable 403	
2019	F2: Fun and Frustration	Ranga	
2019	Ruler	Krishna Reddy	
2019	Maharshi	Ramakrishna	
2019	Bhagyanagara Veedhullo Gammattu	Srinu	Also director and co-producer
2021	Alludu Adhurs	Jaypal Reddy's henchmen	
2021	Gaali Sampath	Driver	
2021	Mugguru Monagallu	Sushanth	
2021	Maestro	SI P. Srinivas Naik	
2021	Manchi Rojulochaie	Broker Srinivas	
2022	Bhala Thandanana	Murthy	
2022	House Arrest	Thief	
2022	F3		
2022	Bimbisara	Zubedha	
2022	Karthikeya 2	Sadananda	SIIMA Award for Best Comedian – Telugu
2022	First Day First Show	Head Constable Sathish	
2023	Waltair Veerayya	Dollar Babu	
2023	Bhuvana Vijayam		
2023	Maya Petika		
2023	Hidimba		
2024	Geethanjali Malli Vachindi	Srinivas / Sreenu	
2024	Baak	Carpenter	Partially reshot version of Aranmanai 4
2024	Vidya Vasula Aham	Narada	
2025	Sankranthiki Vasthunam	Dr. Sreenu	
2025	Coffee with a Killer	Pothana	
2025	Ramam Raghavam	Atin Raju	
2025	Mazaka		
2025	Ari: My Name is Nobody		
2025	K-Ramp	Lecturer	
2025	Paanch Minar	Y. Sherlock Reddy	
2026	Mana Shankara Vara Prasad Garu	Reddy	
2026	Vishnu Vinyasam	OC	
2026	Jetlee	Father	
2026	Rambha Urvasi Menaka	Parimala - Snack shop owner	

=== Television ===
Year	Title	Role	Network	Notes
1997	Lady Detective	Fruit seller	ETV	Episode 21
2000	Santhi Nivasam		ETV	
	Fun Tonic	Anchor	Siti Cable	
	Navvu Navvinchu	Anchor	Gemini TV	
2002	Amrutham	Koyadora, Thief and Sanjeevani's friend's husband	Gemini TV	In various guest roles
