= Good Luck Sakhi =

2022 Indian Telugu film

- Theatrical release poster
- Directed by: Nagesh Kukunoor
- Written by: Nagesh Kukunoor; Sandeep Raj
- Produced by: Sudheer Chandra Padiri
- Starring: Keerthy Suresh; Aadhi Pinisetty; Jagapathi Babu
- Cinematography: Chirantan Das
- Edited by: A. Sreekar Prasad
- Music by: Devi Sri Prasad
- Production company: Worth A Shot Motion Arts
- Distributed by: Sri Venkateswara Creations
- Release date: 28 January 2022
- Running time: 118 minutes
- Country: India
- Language: Telugu

Good Luck Sakhi is a 2022 Indian Telugu-language sports comedy film written and directed by Nagesh Kukunoor. The film stars Keerthy Suresh, Aadhi Pinisetty and Jagapathi Babu. The plot follows Sakhi (Keerthy) who supposedly brings bad luck to everyone. After an army colonel moves to town and opens a sharpshooting centre, she begins to train as a shooter to participate at the national level. The film was announced in April 2019 and marked Kukunoor's directorial debut in Telugu cinema. Devi Sri Prasad composed the music, with cinematography by Chirantan Das and editing by A. Sreekar Prasad. The film was shot in Hyderabad, Vikarabad and Pune, and was completed in September 2020.

Good Luck Sakhi was released theatrically on 28 January 2022, having been delayed multiple times due to the COVID-19 pandemic. The film opened to negative reviews from critics.

== Plot ==
The story begins with Sakhi, also known as "Bad luck Sakhi," attending a marriage proposal where the groom gets injured after the horse stumbles. Later, a shooting coach visits her village and decides to train some of the villagers to represent the shooting squads. Sakhi is chosen along with Soori, who uses the coach's gun to steal jewellery and buy a new bike. The coach finds out and banishes Soori from the academy.

Sakhi participates in a shooting competition but loses her confidence when she sees the talented shooters. However, the coach encourages her, and she qualifies for the national level. Sakhi is caught using her lucky marbles and the coach advises her to focus on her concentration rather than superstitions. Sakhi reaches the final round but loses her aim due to her personal problems with Goli Raju, her childhood friend who still misunderstands her relationship with the coach.

Goli Raju's performance day arrives, and the coach and Sakhi attend the play where he forgets his lines due to Sakhi's bad luck. Goli Raju ends their friendship and returns the lucky marbles which Sakhi had given him during their childhood.

The next day is Sakhi's national shooting competition, and she loses her concentration due to her personal problems. She purposely misses her aim in the final round but eventually wins the gold medal after Goli Raju returns with the marbles and helps her regain her focus.

The story concludes with Sakhi and Goli Raju's wedding.

== Cast ==
- Keerthy Suresh as Sakhi Pawar
- Aadhi Pinisetty as Goli Raju, Sakhi's childhood friend and later husband
- Jagapathi Babu as Sakhi's coach
- Ramaprabha as Sakhi's grandmother, who is supportive of Sakhi
- Rahul Ramakrishna as Soori, who irritates all the girls in the village and also does illegal work
- Divya Sripada as Jyothi
- Raghu Babu
- Shravya
- Venugopal
- Gayatri Bhargavi
- Shweta Verma as Anjali, a talented shooter who wins gold in most of the shooting competitions, later defeated by Sakhi in the finals

== Production ==
Nagesh Kukunoor initially wrote the script for Hrishikesh Mukherjee. After fifteen years it became the director's debut Telugu film. Kukunoor wanted Keerthy Suresh after watching her in Mahanati. The film was officially announced on 27 April 2019. The title Good Luck Sakhi was unveiled in November 2019. Keerthy plays a rural girl from Andhra Pradesh who supposedly brings bad luck to everyone. Following the accidental death of her fiancé just before their wedding, she begins to train as a sharpshooter to participate at the national level.

The first schedule of filming started in April 2019 in Hyderabad. Filming took place in Vikarabad and Pune. Dil Raju joined the production team as presenter in July 2019. 75% of filming was completed by November 2019. After being suspended by the COVID-19 pandemic, filming was resumed in September 2020 and was completed in the same month.

== Release ==
Good Luck Sakhi is released theatrically on 28 January 2022. It was initially scheduled to be released theatrically on 3 June 2021, along with the dubbed versions of Tamil and Malayalam languages. However, the release was indefinitely postponed owing to the COVID-19 pandemic in India. After a while, the film release was scheduled for 19 and 26 November 2021 and also for 3, 10 and 31 December 2021.

=== Home media ===
Post-theatrical digital streaming rights of the film were acquired by Amazon Prime Video. It will be premiered on 12 February 2022 in Telugu along with the dubbed versions in Tamil and Malayalam.

== Reception ==
The film opened to negative reviews from critics and audience. A reviewer from The Hans India wrote: "Good Luck Sakhi is a sports drama that lacks strong characterisations and a gripping presentation. Despite good performances from all the key characters, the dull and predictable proceedings make "Good Luck Sakhi" a disappointing watch. The New Indian Express rated 1.5 out on 5 and wrote Good Luck Sakhi also positions itself as a woman-empowerment message movie, even if this angle becomes secondary to everything else. The vagueness in the narration doesn't always drive home the message: 'There's no such thing like luck, you determine your own destiny.' So nothing much stays with us once you step out of the theatre. Writing for The Hindu, Sangeetha Devi Dundoo wrote that the story was "simplistic and predictable," and falls way short of being another Iqbal.

The Times of India critic Neeshita Nyayapati rated 2.5 out on 5 and wrote felt that Kukunoor's Telugu debut was a let down. "Good Luck Sakhi has a terrific opening that draws you in. Devi Sri Prasad's number Bad Luck Sakhi plays out almost like a musical on a Broadway show and you're intrigued. However, despite the composer, cinematographer Chiratan Das and the lead actors giving their best, the film's sound design and editing are also a let-down." A reviewer from Eenadu appreciated the performances but criticised the screenplay and lack of strong conflict.
