= Sankranthiki Vasthunam =

2025 film by Anil Ravipudi

- Theatrical release poster
- Directed by: Anil Ravipudi
- Written by: Anil Ravipudi; S. Krishna; G. Adhinarayana
- Produced by: Dil Raju; Sirish
- Starring: Venkatesh; Aishwarya Rajesh; Meenakshi Chaudhary
- Cinematography: Sameer Reddy
- Edited by: Tammiraju
- Music by: Bheems Ceciroleo
- Production company: Sri Venkateswara Creations
- Distributed by: see below
- Release date: 14 January 2025
- Running time: 144 minutes
- Country: India
- Language: Telugu
- Budget: ₹50 crore
- Box office: est. ₹258–300 crore (Note: The Financial Express reported ₹258 crore and NDTV, News18, The Hans India, The Hindu, The Economic Times have reported the ₹300 crore gross.)

Sankranthiki Vasthunam (transl. We are coming for Sankranthi) is a 2025 Indian Telugu-language action comedy film written and directed by Anil Ravipudi and produced by Sri Venkateswara Creations. It stars Venkatesh, Aishwarya Rajesh, and Meenakshi Chaudhary. The film follows YD Raju (Venkatesh), an ex-police offficer whose happy life is upended when Meenakshi (Chaudhary), his former girlfriend, also a police officer, seeks his help to rescue an abducted NRI CEO from a criminal gang. Throughout the mission, he finds himself caught in the crossfire between his suspicious wife Bhagyam (Aishwarya) and his former girlfriend.

Launched with the working title SVC 58 or VenkyAnil3, the official title to be announced in November 2024. The film features music composed by Bheems Ceciroleo and cinematography by Sameer Reddy. Principal photography took place in Rajamahendravaram, Hyderabad, Kasaragod, Dehradun, Mussoorie, and Rishikesh.

Sankranthiki Vasthunam was released on 14 January 2025, coinciding with the Sankranti festival, where it received generally positive reviews from both critics and audiences. It was a massive box office success, grossing over ₹258–300 crore worldwide and emerged as the second-highest grossing Telugu film of the year.

== Plot ==
Satya Akella, a prominent global businessman, arrives in India at the invitation of Telangana Chief Minister Keshava for what is meant to be a strategic business retreat. During a visit to a secluded farmhouse, he is kidnapped by Biju Pandey's gang, who plan to use him as leverage to secure the release of Biju's imprisoned brother, Papa Pandey. However, the unyielding jailer George Antony refuses to free Papa without formal government authorization—something the Chief Minister is unwilling to provide, fearing political fallout.

With the situation spiraling, police officer Meenakshi turns to her former lover, YD Raju, a retired encounter specialist known for his unorthodox methods. Now married to Bhagyam and a father of four, living in Rajamahendravaram, is reluctantly drawn back into action. Suspicious of their history, Bhagyam insists on joining the mission, bringing along her son, her father, and even their household worker, turning a high-stakes rescue into a chaotic family operation.

The team infiltrates the prison and engineers a brawl to have Papa Pandey hospitalized, then cleverly manipulates George Antony and his subordinate Manikya Rao to extract him. But their plan derails when Papa accidentally falls off a cliff during a bizarre altercation with Bhagyam and is ultimately killed in a freak accident. Forced to improvise, Raju disguises Papa's corpse and puppeteers it to deceive Biju Pandey, while tensions flare between Bhagyam and Meenakshi.

The deception unravels amid a violent gang shootout, and Biju discovers his brother's death. In the ensuing chaos, Raju eliminates Biju and dismantles his gang, successfully rescuing Akella. Yet instead of returning him immediately, Raju leverages the situation to confront the Chief Minister. He demands justice for his former teacher, who was falsely accused and humiliated by an MLA (Keshava's own uncle) or else the truth about the kidnapping will be exposed.

The teacher is publicly cleared, Akella returns safely to the United States. Raju resumes his family life, only to discover that Meenakshi has been transferred to his village as their new neighbor, reigniting unresolved tensions and setting the stage for further turmoil.

== Cast ==
- Venkatesh as ex-DCP Yadagiri Damodara Raju IPS "Sinaraju" alias YD Raju / Yama Dharma Raju
  - Karthikeya Dev as young YD Raju
- Aishwarya Rajesh as Bhagyalakshmi "Bhagyam" Sinaraju, Raju's wife
- Meenakshi Chaudhary as ACP C. Meenakshi IPS "Meenu", Raju's ex-girlfriend
- P. Sai Kumar as Constable P. Manikya Rao
- Naresh as Keshava, Ganesh's younger brother and CM of Telangana
- VTV Ganesh as T. V. Ganesh, Keshava's elder brother, Party President
- Sarvadaman D. Banerjee as Schoolmaster Yadagiri
- Upendra Limaye as Jailer George Antony
- Srinivas Avasarala in a dual role as Satya Akella and Prem
- Bheemala Revanth Pavan Sai Subhash as Bulli Raju, Raju and Bhagyam's son
- Muralidhar Goud as Bhagyam's father
- Srikanth Iyengar as MLA
- Vadlamani Srinivas as IG Srinivasa Rao
- Srinivasa Reddy as Sreenu, Keshava's family doctor
- Babloo Prithiveeraj as Pankaj Pandey
- Rajitha as Bhagyam’s mother
- Anand Ramaraju as Bhagyam’s brother-in-law
- Pammi Sai as Raju and Bhagyam’s house-worker
- Pradeep Kabra as Papa Pandey
- Mahesh Balaraj as Bijju Pandey, Nayak’s rival
- Anantha Sriram as Prem Pandey
- Satya Prakash as Billu Nayak
- Amit Tiwari as Chota Nayak, Billu’s brother
- Anand Raj as MLA
- Bheems Ceciroleo in a cameo appearance as DJ in "Blockbuster Pongal"
- Anil Ravipudi as Raju’s neighbour in a cameo appearance

== Production ==
Anil Ravipudi's third collaboration with Venkatesh after F2: Fun and Frustration (2019) and F3: Fun and Frustration (2022) was announced in July 2024. The film was initially tentatively titled SVC 58 or VenkyAnil3. The film crew held a pooja ceremony in Hyderabad on July 3. The film was produced by Sri Venkateswara Creations who also produced their earlier collaborations. Meenakshi Chaudhary and Aishwarya Rajesh were cast as the female leads. The title was announced as Sankrantiki Vasthunam in November 2024.

Principal photography began on 11 July 2024. Filming took place in Rajamahendravaram, Hyderabad, Kasaragod, Koraput, Dehradun, Mussoorie and Rishikesh. The climax of the film was shot in Kadapa.

== Music ==
The soundtrack album was released on 14 January 2025 after the film's release.

== Release ==
=== Theatrical ===
Sankranthiki Vasthunam was released in theatres on 14 January 2025, coinciding with Sankranthi.

=== Distribution ===
Sri Venkateswara Creations is independently responsible for the distribution of this film in Andhra Pradesh and Telangana. The overseas rights were acquired by Phars Film Co, while Shloka Entertainments bought the distribution rights for North America. The United Kingdom theatrical rights were sold to Dreamz Entertainment. The distribution rights in Australia and New Zealand were acquired by Hamsini Entertainment and Tolly Movies International.

=== Home media ===
The satellite and digital rights of the film were acquired by Zee Telugu and ZEE5, respectively. ZEE5 acquired the film's digital streaming rights for ₹30 crore. The film was telecast on Zee Telugu before its OTT release on 1 March 2025. It began streaming on ZEE5 from 1 March 2025.

== Reception ==
Avad Mohammad of OTTplay gave 3.5/5 stars and wrote "Sankranthiki Vasthunnam is a perfect festival watch packed with loads of entertainment. Venkatesh leads from the front, delivering a hilarious performance. While the predictable storyline may not appeal to everyone, the family audience is sure to enjoy the film." T. Maruthi Acharya of India Today gave 3/5 stars and wrote "With its mix of engaging comedy and uneven storytelling, Sankranthiki Vasthunnam is a decent outing for families seeking light-hearted entertainment." B.H. Harish of Cinema Express gave 3/5 stars and wrote "But then again, it depends on you if you want to judge this film from that lens. For everyone else who merely wants to have a few hearty laughs, Sankranthiki Vasthunam offers them in plenty." Sashidhar Adivi of Times Now gave 2.5/5 stars and wrote "Sankranthiki Vasthunnam will often make you laugh, especially if you are a fan of out-and-out slapstick comedies. A focused script, tighter editing and impressive cinematography would have elevated the film a few notches. The muddled-up storyline and how the events pan out leave much to be desired."

== Accolades ==
Award (Note: Awards, festivals and organizations are in alphabetical order.)	Date of ceremony (Note: Date is linked to the article about the awards held that year, wherever possible.)	Category	Recipient(s)	Result	Ref.
Indian National Cine Academy Awards	2026	Best Director – Telugu	Anil Ravipudi	Won	
Indian National Cine Academy Awards	2026	Best Actor in a Comedy Role	Revanth (Bulli Raju)	Won	
International Film Festival of India	2025	Indian Panorama – Feature Films	Sankranthiki Vasthunam	Nominated	
South Indian International Movie Awards	2026	Entertaining Film of the Year – Telugu	Sri Venkateswara Creations	Won	
South Indian International Movie Awards	2026	Best Director – Telugu	Anil Ravipudi	Won	
South Indian International Movie Awards	2026	Best Entertainer – Telugu	Venkatesh	Won	
South Indian International Movie Awards	2026	Best Actress (Critics) – Telugu	Aishwarya Rajesh	Won	
South Indian International Movie Awards	2026	Best Actor in a Comic Role – Telugu	Revanth (Bulli Raju)	Won	
South Indian International Movie Awards	2026	Best Male Playback Singer – Telugu	Ramana Gogula (for "Godari Gattu")	Won	
Telangana Gaddar Film Awards	2026	Best Entertainment Film	Dil Raju, Sirish, Anil Ravipudi	Won	
Telangana Gaddar Film Awards	2026	Best Screenplay Writer	Anil Ravipudi	Won	
Zee Telugu Apsara Awards	2025	Best Actress	Aishwarya Rajesh	Won	

== Sequel ==
After the success of Sankranthiki Vasthunam, Ravipudi planned a sequel named Malli Sankranthiki Vasthunam. Later, at a celebration party following the film's success, Venkatesh announced that a sequel would be release in January 2027, ahead of Sankranti. However, Ravipudi and Venkatesh prioritized another project titled January 12 Vidudala (2027).
