= Mana Shankara Vara Prasad Garu =

2026 film by Anil Ravipudi

- Theatrical release poster
- Directed by: Anil Ravipudi
- Written by: Anil Ravipudi
- Produced by: Sahu Garapati; Sushmita Konidela
- Starring: Chiranjeevi; Venkatesh; Nayanthara; Catherine Tresa
- Cinematography: Sameer Reddy
- Edited by: Tammiraju
- Music by: Bheems Ceciroleo
- Production companies: Shine Screens; Gold Box Entertainments
- Release date: 12 January 2026
- Running time: 165 minutes
- Country: India
- Language: Telugu
- Budget: ₹120−130 crore
- Box office: ₹300–310 crore (Note: Mana Shankara Vara Prasad Garu's reported worldwide grosses vary between ₹300 crore (Filmfare, The Week) – ₹310 crore (Deccan Chronicle))

Mana Shankara Vara Prasad Garu (transl. Our Mr. Shankara Vara Prasad) is a 2026 Indian Telugu-language action comedy film written and directed by Anil Ravipudi. The film is produced by Sahu Garapati and Sushmita Konidela. It stars Chiranjeevi in the titular role, alongside Venkatesh, Nayanthara and Catherine Tresa. The plot follows Shankara Vara Prasad, a national security officer who seeks to protect his estranged wife and children, seeing it as a chance to re-unite with them.

Principal photography began on 23 May 2024, with filming taking place in Hyderabad, Kerala, Mussoorie, and Dehradun. The film's shoot was wrapped up in December 2025. The film has music composed by Bheems Ceciroleo.

The film was theatrically released on 12 January 2026 and received positive reviews from critics, with praise at Chiranjeevi’s performance but criticising the writing. It performed well at the box office, making it the first blockbuster of 2026 in Indian cinema.

== Plot ==
National Security Guard officer Shankara Vara Prasad falls in love with and marries Sasirekha. However, their marriage is short-lived due to a severe ideological rift between Prasad and his father-in-law, GVR, a powerful and influential businessman. The conflict escalates to the point that Prasad and Sasirekha are forced to divorce. Separated from his wife and children for six years, Prasad longs for an opportunity to reunite with them.

Years later, Prasad learns that his children are attending a boarding school. Seizing the chance to reconnect with them, he adopts a new identity and secures a position at the school as a Physical Training (PT) mentor. He is assisted by his team members Jwaala, Narayana, and Mustafa. Although he gradually bonds with his children, Sasirekha eventually discovers his true identity. Despite her initial shock, she chooses not to reveal the truth to their children while Prasad continues his efforts to redeem himself.

Meanwhile, in Mumbai, an assassination attempt targeting GVR takes place. Recognizing the seriousness of the threat, the central government appoints Prasad—revealed to be a former National Security Guard advisor—as GVR's lead security officer.

Prasad enters GVR's household with the dual aim of reuniting with Sasirekha and confronting GVR, whom he holds responsible for their divorce. Complications arise when Venky Gowda, an influential businessman from Karnataka, arrives with the intention of marrying Sasirekha. Amid wedding preparations and family misunderstandings, Prasad investigates the assassination attempt and concludes that the real target was Sasirekha, not GVR.

Months earlier, Police Inspector Virendra Pandey's brother had raped and murdered a woman. Due to public outrage, the police attempt to kill the accused in an encounter killing. However, Virendra Pandey secretly plots his brother's escape, which is foiled by Sasirekha and her children. Pandey's brother is killed by the police, and Pandey is imprisoned. After being released on bail six months later, he seeks revenge against Sasirekha.

Venky and Prasad later reconcile after rediscovering their past friendship. Venky abandons his plans to marry Sasirekha and instead supports Prasad. Virendra Pandey subsequently attacks Sasirekha at her bungalow, but Prasad intervenes and kills him. Prasad ultimately earns the forgiveness of GVR and Sasirekha, leading to his reunion with Sasirekha, while Venky marries Jwaala.

== Cast ==
- Chiranjeevi as Shankara Varaprasad
- Venkatesh as Venky Gowda
- Nayanthara as Sasirekha "Sasi"
- Catherine Tresa as Jwala
- Zarina Wahab as Varaprasad's mother
- Harsha Vardhan as Narayana
- Abhinav Gomatam as Mustafa
- Sachin Khedekar as GVR, Sasi's father
- Sharat Saxena as MP Nitin Sharma
- Harsha Chemudu as Drunkard in Forest
- Raghu Babu as Intelligence Officer
- Sudev Nair as Virendra Pandey
- Srinivasa Reddy as Reddy, GVR's PA
- Khushi Soni as Nikki, Vara Prasad and Sasi’s daughter
- Ooha Reddy as Vikki, Vara Prasad and Sasi’s son
- Bheemala Revanth as C. P. L Sugunesh
- Vadlamani Srinivas as School Principal
- Karuna Bhushan as Sasi’s friend
- Nandana Nandu as Sasi’s friend
- Anil Ravipudi as Himself in "Mega Victory Mass" song (Cameo)

== Production ==
=== Development ===
Following the film Sankranthiki Vasthunam (2025), director Anil Ravipudi narrated a script to actor Chiranjeevi which would mark their maiden collaboration. The film was formally launched on 30 March 2025 with the working title Mega 157 (intended to be Chiranjeevi's 157th film as lead actor). Actress Nayanthara was cast opposite Chiranjeevi. Venkatesh was signed for a "substantial role" in the film. The film thus marked the first on-screen collaboration between the actors in their decades long career.

In August 2025, the film's title was announced as Mana Shankara Vara Prasad Garu, referencing Chiranjeevi's real name "Shankara Vara Prasad."

=== Principal photography ===
Principal photography began on 23 May 2024 in Hyderabad. Filming also took place in Kerala, Mussoorie, and Dehradun. The film's shoot was wrapped up 14 December 2025.

== Music ==
The soundtrack and background score was composed by Bheems Ceciroleo.

== Release ==
Mana Shankara Vara Prasad Garu was theatrically released on 12 January 2026, coinciding with Sankranti.

=== Home media ===
The film's digital streaming rights were acquired by ZEE5, and it premiered on the platform on 11 February 2026.

== Reception ==
=== Critical reception ===
Mana Shankara Varaprasad Garu received mixed reviews from critics. Chiranjeevi has received praised for his performance but the film is criticized for its writing. Writing for The New Indian Express, Suresh Kavirayani opined that, "This film belongs entirely to Chiranjeevi. More than Anil Ravipudi’s writing, it is Chiru’s screen presence that holds the film together." NDTV's Latha Srinivasan, who rated the film 2.5/5, stated: "The plot is not new and neither is the treatment - the jokes fall flat and really don't hit the high notes at any point." Swaroop Kodur of The Indian Express, who also rated the film 2.5/5, saying that, "the film makes a low-effort attempt at entertaining us, and only a few parts work well." On the film's writing, Shruthi Ganapati Raman of The Hollywood Reporter India, stated, "The writing remains slaphappy and nostalgic, evocative of films that represented good family fun."

A reviewer from Eenadu, identified Chiranjeevi's performance in the film, humour and climax as its positives while screenplay of the second-half is a letdown. On Chiranjeevi–Venkatesh collaboration, Sangeetha Devi of The Hindu stated that the portions are slightly underwhelming, is "film is weighed down by the expectations that come with pairing two superstars." She has also criticized the film's technical values and cinematography.

=== Box office ===
The film grossed ₹65 crore on its opening day, with ₹44.75 crore from India and $2.3 million in international territories. It is Chiranjeevi's second best opening following Sye Raa Narasimha Reddy. After the first seven days of its release, the film grossed between ₹222.50–225 crores worldwide including ₹189–157.75 crore domestically.

The film earned an estimated ₹300–310 crore worldwide over its 50-day theatrical run.
