= F2: Fun and Frustration =

2019 film by Anil Ravipudi

- Theatrical release poster
- Directed by: Anil Ravipudi
- Written by: Anil Ravipudi
- Produced by: Dil Raju; Sirish–Laxman
- Starring: Venkatesh; Varun Tej; Tamannaah Bhatia; Mehreen Pirzada
- Cinematography: Sameer Reddy
- Edited by: Tammiraju
- Music by: Devi Sri Prasad
- Production company: Sri Venkateswara Creations
- Distributed by: Sri Venkateswara Creations
- Release date: 12 January 2019
- Running time: 150 minutes
- Country: India
- Language: Telugu
- Budget: ₹30 crore
- Box office: est. ₹127.2–140 crore

F2: Fun and Frustration is a 2019 Indian Telugu-language romantic comedy film written and directed by Anil Ravipudi. Produced by Sri Venkateswara Creations, the film stars Venkatesh, Varun Tej, Tamannaah Bhatia, and Mehreen Pirzada. The music is composed by Devi Sri Prasad. The plot follows two men who try to control their dominating wives after getting married.

F2 was released on 12 January 2019 during Sankranthi, and grossed over ₹127.2–140 crore against a budget of ₹30 crore, becoming a major commercial success. F2 was featured in the Indian Panorama Mainstream section of the 50th International Film Festival of India.

It is the first film in the Fun and Frustration series with a standalone sequel titled F3 released in May 2022, which was also a commercial success.

== Plot ==
In the Czech Republic, the cops apprehended Venky and Varun for abusing two women. Interrogated by Indian Embassy officials Vishwanath, Venky, and Varun reveal that the women who filed a case against them are his wife and girlfriend, respectively, much to Vishwanath's surprise. Curious, Vishwanath asks them about their past.

Past: Venky was an orphan with high dreams about marriage and works as personal assistant to MLA Anji Reddy, earning a handsome income. Through a marriage bureau, Venky met Harika, a software engineer who lives with her parents, sister Honey, and paternal and maternal grandmothers Ganga and Manga. Her family was happy that Venky is an orphan, and Harika would therefore not have any problem with in-laws that women generally face, the family accepted marriage. Venky and Harika marry happily. However, they began to argue over petty issues, and Venky felt tormented. Plus, their neighbor Prasad, who showcased his love for his wife publicly, added to Harika's jealousy and Venky's problems. Unable to live in a hostel, Honey began to live with Harika and Venky and created issues between them when Venky tried to tell Harika that Honey had a boyfriend.

Varun is Honey's boyfriend and runs a hotel. Venky saw Honey hugging Varun and told Harika and her family, but they refused to believe him. He challenged them that he would expose Honey one day, and Harika and her family promised to be slaves for him if he did. Venky succeeded in doing so and was unwilling to be tormented by a vengeful Venky; Harika and her mother lied that they already knew about Honey's relationship and were just testing him by challenging him. Despite Venky's warning about the side effects of marriage and Honey, Varun proceeded to have an engagement. Venky exposed Prasad's second wife (Swarna) to his first wife as an act of revenge for tormenting him. Within six days, Varun faced problems managing Honey and his mother, Kanthamma, who had issues with each other. Frustrated, Varun agreed with Venky. Prasad joined them and theorized that women need husbands. On the former's wedding day, Venky, Varun, and Prasad escape to Europe to teach their wives a lesson, which shatters Honey and Harika when they find Varun and Venky missing.

Venky, Varun, and Prasad enjoyed their lives in Europe. One day, Honey and Harika saw them in Europe and requested them to return, but they mocked and insulted them. Honey and Harika left the place, cursing them. Venky, Varun, and Prasad gatecrashed a party hosted by influential businessman Dora Swamy Naidu on the occasion of his sons' fixed marriages. Venky and Varun were stunned to know that Harika and Honey were the brides of Dora Swamy Naidu's sons. Dora Swamy Naidu believes that a home would be peaceful if the family's sons were married to sisters, who would act peacefully by being sisters with each other. Dora Swamy Naidu's wife and his elder brother Ramaswamy Naidu's wife are sisters, too. Doraswamy Naidu had previously broken his elder son's marriage with Anasuya when the latter's sister refused to marry his younger son. Besides, Honey and Harika declined to return when Varun and Venky challenged them to stop the marriage. Impersonating themselves as writers willing to write a biography of Doraswamy, Naidu, Venky, and Varun enter his house and try several methods to prevent the marriage. Still, Harika and Honey thwart their attempts. Frustrated as Honey and Harika get engaged, Varun and Venky get drunk and create a scene. Doraswamy Naidu had them arrested and revealed that Honey and Harika revealed the truth to him long ago.

Present: After listening to their story, Vishwanath takes Venky, Prasad, and Varun to his house and introduces them to his wife, Lakshmi, with whom he shares a cordial relationship. Vishwanath lectures the trio that husbands must comprehend their wives, who still love them despite their ignorance, whereas the latter always feel troubled. Admitting their faults, Venky and Varun step to reconcile with their respective partners. They gatecrash Honey and Harika's Sangeet party with Anasuya, who convinced her younger sister to marry Doraswamy Naidu's younger son. However, the discussion comes to a halt when John Snow, Anasuya's brother, has Doraswamy Naidu, Harika, and Honey kidnapped as an act of revenge, unaware of the scenario that happened.

John takes the trio onto a weak bridge, unaware of its condition where everyone reaches, and John realizes what happened at the Sangeet Party. Harika and Honey still refuse to reconcile with Venky and Varun. The bridge starts to collapse. Harika and Honey go onto the safe side while Venky, Varun, and others remain trapped. Harika and Honey give in when Venky and Varun attempt suicide, and reveal that they had sent Anasuya to them and always wanted them to realize. Venky and Varun go to the safer side by using the Caution board as a bridge. However, the board falls into the river when the others trapped on the bridge fight about who has to go first. Venky, Varun, Harika, and Honey leave while the trapped people wait for the rescue team.

== Cast ==
- Venkatesh as Venky
- Varun Tej as Varun Yadav
- Tamannaah Bhatia as Harika
- Mehreen Pirzada as Honey
- Rajendra Prasad as Prasad
- Prakash Raj as Dora Swamy Naidu
- Nassar as Indian Embassy official Viswanath
- Vennela Kishore as John Strow, Venky & Varun’s friend
- Priyadarshi Pullikonda as Darshi, Varun's friend
- Prudhvi Raj as Ramaswamy Naidu
- Raghu Babu as MLA Anji Reddy
- Subbaraju as Ravindranath, Doraswamy Naidu's elder son and Harika's fiancée
- Satyam Rajesh as Shankarnarayan, Dora Swamy Naidu's younger son and Honey's fiancée
- Srinivasa Reddy as Ranga, Dora Swamy Naidu's servant
- Hari Teja as Padmavathi, Dora Swamy Naidu's sister
- Brahmaji as Dr. Albert Narayan Das, a Psychiatrist
- Easwari Rao as Lakshmi
- Sivannarayana Naripeddi as Sivannarayana, Honey's college principal
- Jhansi as Kanthamma
- Pradeep Kondiparthi as Govindharaju, Harika and Honey's father, Ganga's son
- Pragathi as Yamuna, Harika and Honey's mother, Manga's daughter
- Y. Vijaya as Manga, Harika and Honey's maternal grandmother, Yamuna's mother
- Annapurna as Ganga, Harika and Honey's paternal grandmother, Govindharaju's mother
- Rajasree Nair as Dora Swamy Naidu's wife, Gayathri's sister
- Rajitha as Gayathri, Ramaswamy Naidu's wife
- Vadlamani Srinivas as Ravi Shankar, Marriage bureau owner
- Chammak Chandra as Chandra, cultural fest manager in Honey's college
- Rocket Raghava as Rajendar, Salesman in shopping mall
- Madhavi Vootla as Madhu, Prasad's first wife
- Swarna as Prasad's second wife

Cameo appearance

- Anasuya Bharadwaj as Anasuya
- Anil Ravipudi as himself

== Production ==
Principal photography began on 27 June 2018. Filming took place in Hyderabad, Prague and Bangkok.

== Music ==
F2: Fun and Frustration

Soundtrack album by Devi Sri Prasad
- Released: 30 December 2018
- Recorded: 2018
- Genre: Feature film soundtrack
- Length: 23:51
- Language: Telugu
- Label: Aditya Music
- Producer: Devi Sri Prasad

Devi Sri Prasad chronology
Vinaya Vidheya Rama (2018)	F2: Fun and Frustration (2018)	Chitralahari (2019)

Singles from F2: Fun and Frustration
- 1. "Rechipodham Brother" Released: 20 December 2018; 2. "Entho Fun" Released: 26 December 2018; 3. "Honey is the Best" Released: 29 December 2018

The music is composed by Devi Sri Prasad, marking his first collaboration with Anil Ravipudi, and the lyrics were written by Sri Mani, Balaji, and Kasarla Shyam. Audio rights to the film were purchased by Aditya Music. A video teaser of "Rechipodham Brother" was released on 19 December 2018, and the lyrical video was released a day later on 20 December 2018. The second single track, "Entho Fun" sung by Devi Sri Prasad was released on 26 December 2018. The third single track "Honey is the Best" was released on 29 December 2018. The audio launch event took place on 30 December 2018, at RK Beach in Vishakapatnam.

Tracklist
No.	Title	Lyrics	Singer(s)	Length
1.	"Rechipodham"	Kasarla Shyam	David Simon	3:44
2.	"Entho Fun"	Shreemani	Devi Sri Prasad	4:34
3.	"Honey Is The Best"	Shreemani	Hariharasudhan	3:10
4.	"Dhan Dhan"	Kasarla Shyam	Hemachandra, Sravana Bhargavi	3:48
5.	"Girra Girra"	Balaji	Sagar, M. M. Manasi	4:55
6.	"Ding Dong"	Kasarla Shyam	Rahul Sipligunj, Malathi	3:33
Total length:				23:51

== Release ==
=== Theatrical ===
F2: Fun and Frustration was released in the Telugu language worldwide on 12 January 2019 coinciding with the Sankranthi weekend. The film was dubbed and released in Hindi, Tamil, and Malayalam under the same title.

=== Home media ===
The film was dubbed into Hindi and released on 14 July 2019 by Aditya Movies.

== Reception ==
=== Box office ===
F2 grossed ₹17.2 crore on opening day in Andhra Pradesh and Telangana, and ₹22 crore in India. By the third weekend, the film grossed $2 million at the United States box office, and by the end of its full theatrical run, it grossed more than ₹185 crore worldwide and wound up as one of the highest grossing Telugu film of 2019.

=== Critical response ===
Y. Sunita Chowdhary of The Hindu wrote: "This family drama’s appeal stems from good casting. Venkatesh plays his comic part to perfection consistently and capitalizes on Ravipudi’s dialogues with great timing and flourish. One is reminded of his glorious projects in the past. Varun Tej also impresses."

Firstpost gave 3.5 out of 5 stars and stated "F2 manages to entertain quite a lot and it's well-intentioned. It wants men to understand the importance of saying ‘sorry’ and ‘I love you’ when it matters the most. In the film, Venky and Varun might have learned their lesson the hard way, but they do unravel the secret to a life of happiness — that you don't have to learn Venky Aasan, but just follow what Pradeep says right from the beginning till the end — Anthega Anthega".

The Times of India gave 2.5 out of 5 stars and said "Give it a go for Venkatesh, who saves this film from sinking into oblivion. But give it a cold hard miss if outdated humor and gender tropes are not your cups of tea."

== Sequel ==
After the success of F2, Ravipudi and Raju planned a sequel named F3. The film was released on 27 May 2022.
