= Anil Ravipudi =

Indian filmmaker

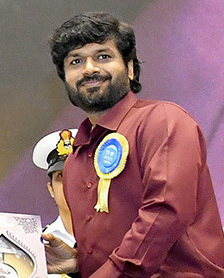
- Ravipudi in 2025
- Born: 23 November 1982 (age 43); Prakasam district, Andhra Pradesh, India
- Education: B.Tech
- Occupations: Film director; screenwriter
- Years active: 2006–present

Anil Kumar Ravipudi (born 23 November 1982) is an Indian film director and screenwriter known for his works in Telugu cinema. He is best known for writing and directing action comedy films. He made his directorial debut with the action comedy film Pataas (2015) and won the SIIMA Award for Best Debut Director – Telugu. He then directed two action comedies Supreme (2016) and Raja The Great (2017) and then the comedy F2: Fun and Frustration (2019). F2 was featured in the "Indian Panorama" Mainstream section of the 50th IFFI.

Ravipudi later transitioned to family entertainers characterised by fast-paced repartee, humorous content, action elements, and themes exploring relationships and the significance of women in society, earning highest foot falls with Sarileru Neekevvaru (2020), and Bhagvanth Kesari (2023) fetching the National Film Award for Best Feature Film in Telugu. The sankranti outings Sankranthiki Vasthunam (2025), and Mana Shankara Vara Prasad Garu (2026) turned out to be box office hits.

== Early life and career ==
Anil Ravipudi was born on 23 November 1982 in a Telugu family in Prakasam district, Andhra Pradesh. After completing B.Tech from Vignan college in 2005, Ravipudi joined as an assistant director to his uncle P. A. Arun Prasad. He then worked as a dialogue writer for films like Sankham (2009), Kandireega (2011) and co-wrote the script for films Masala (2013) and Aagadu (2014). Ravipudi worked with Santosh Srinivas in the latter's directorial debut Kandireega (2011) as a writer and wrote the script of Pataas.

Ravipudi later approached Nandamuri Kalyan Ram through a friend. After completing the writing, he again approached Kalyan Ram and both began working on the film. The film, which was also produced by Kalyan Ram, received positive reviews from critics and became successful at the box office. He continued to deliver hit films one after the other with Supreme (2016), Raja the Great (2017), F2 (2019), Sarileru Neekevvaru (2020), F3 (2022), and Bhagavanth Kesari (2023), with 4 of the films being produced by Dil Raju.

In 2025, he reunited with Raju and Venkatesh, after F2 and F3, on Sankranthiki Vasthunam, which released during Sankranthi 2025. Though it opened to mixed reviews, it went on to become a huge money spinner and became the highest-grossing comedy in Telugu cinema and the highest-grossing solo film for Venkatesh.

== Filmography ==
Key
†	Denotes films that have not yet been released

=== As director and screenwriter ===
Year	Title
2015	Pataas
2016	Supreme
2017	Raja the Great
2019	F2: Fun and Frustration
2020	Sarileru Neekevvaru
2022	F3
2023	Bhagavanth Kesari
2025	Sankranthiki Vasthunam
2026	Mana Shankara Vara Prasad Garu
2027	January 12 Vidudala †

=== Other crew positions ===
Year	Title	Screenplay	Dialogue
2009	Sankham	No	Yes
2010	Happy Happy Ga	No	Yes
2011	Kandireega	Uncredited	No
2012	Daruvu	No	Yes
2013	Masala	No	Yes
2014	Aagadu	Yes	No
2015	Pandaga Chesko	Yes	No
2021	Gaali Sampath	Yes	No
2026	Jana Nayagan	Yes	No

=== As an actor ===
Year	Title	Notes
2008	Souryam	Cameo appearances
2009	Sankham	Cameo appearances
2015	Pataas	Cameo appearances
2016	Supreme	Cameo appearances
2017	Raja the Great	Cameo appearance in the song "Raja The Great"
2019	F2: Fun and Frustration	Cameo appearances
2020	Sarileru Neekevvaru	Cameo appearances
2022	F3	Cameo appearances
2023	Bhagavanth Kesari	Cameo appearances
2025	Sankranthiki Vasthunam	Cameo appearances
2026	Mana Shankara Vara Prasad Garu	Cameo appearance in the song "Mega Victory Mass"
2026	ENE Repeat	Cameo appearance

=== Television ===
Year	Title	Role	Network	Notes
2025	Drama Juniors	Judge	Zee Telugu	Season 8
2025–2026	Sa Re Ga Ma Pa Lil' Champs	Judge	Zee Telugu	Season 17
2026	Aata	Guest Judge	Zee Telugu	
2026–present	Sa Re Ga Ma Pa The Next Singing Sensation	Judge	Zee Telugu	

== Awards and nominations ==
Year	Award	Category	Film	Result	Ref.
2016	5th South Indian International Movie Awards	Best Debut Director – Telugu	Pataas	Won	
2016	14th Santosham Film Awards	Best Debut Director	Pataas	Won	
2019	9th South Indian International Movie Awards	Best Director – Telugu	F2: Fun and Frustration	Nominated	
2019	9th South Indian International Movie Awards	Entertainer of the Year	F2: Fun and Frustration	Won	
2020	10th South Indian International Movie Awards	Best Director – Telugu	Sarileru Neekevvaru	Nominated	
2024	69th Filmfare Awards South	Best Director – Telugu	Bhagavanth Kesari	Nominated	
2024	3rd IIFA Utsavam	Best Director – Telugu	Bhagavanth Kesari	Won	
2025	71st National Film Awards	Best Telugu Feature Film	Bhagavanth Kesari	Won	
2026	14th South Indian International Movie Awards	Best Director – Telugu	Sankranthiki Vasthunam	Won	
