= Venu Sriram =

Indian film director and screenwriter

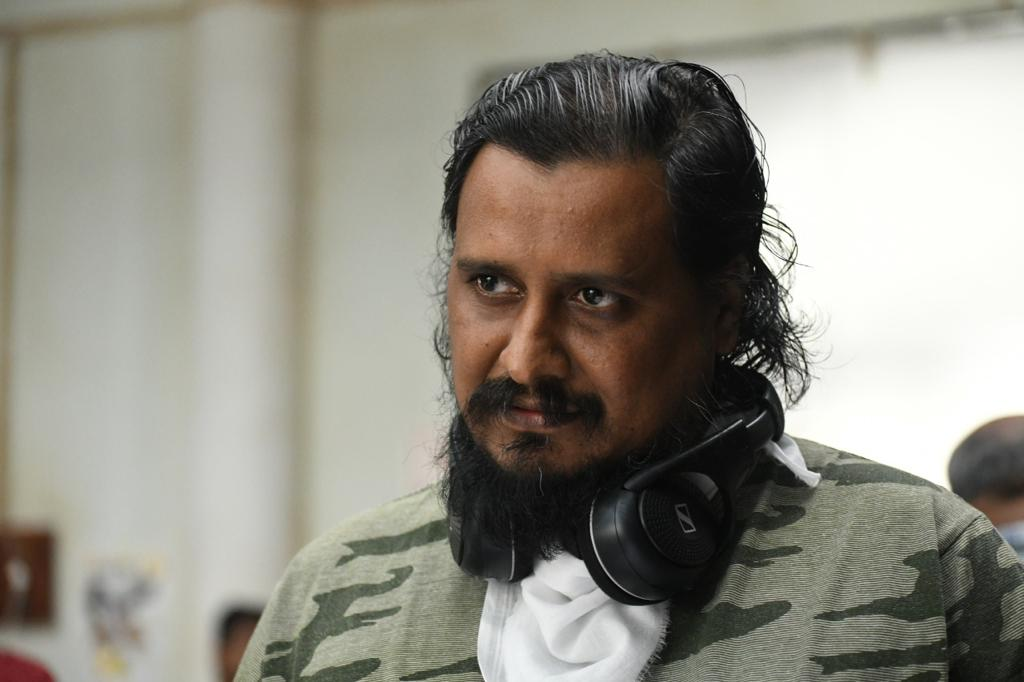
- Sriram in 2021
- Born: Medipalle, Jagityal, Telangana, India
- Occupations: Film director; screenwriter
- Years active: 2011–present

Venu Sriram is an Indian film director and screenwriter who works in Telugu cinema.

== Career ==
In 2011, he made his directorial debut with Oh My Friend. He was to direct Ravi Teja in Yevado Okadu (2015). He went on to direct Middle Class Abbayi (2017), which was successful. He was attached to direct ICON starring Allu Arjun since 2019, but the film did not reach fruition due to the actor's busy schedules. He gained appreciation for his masala laden remake of Pink (2016) titled Vakeel Saab (2021).

== Filmography ==
Key
†	Denotes films that have not yet been released

Year	Title	Notes
2011	Oh My Friend	Debut film
2017	Middle Class Abbayi	
2021	Vakeel Saab	
2025	Thammudu	
