= Kasarla Shyam =

Lyricist in Telugu cinema

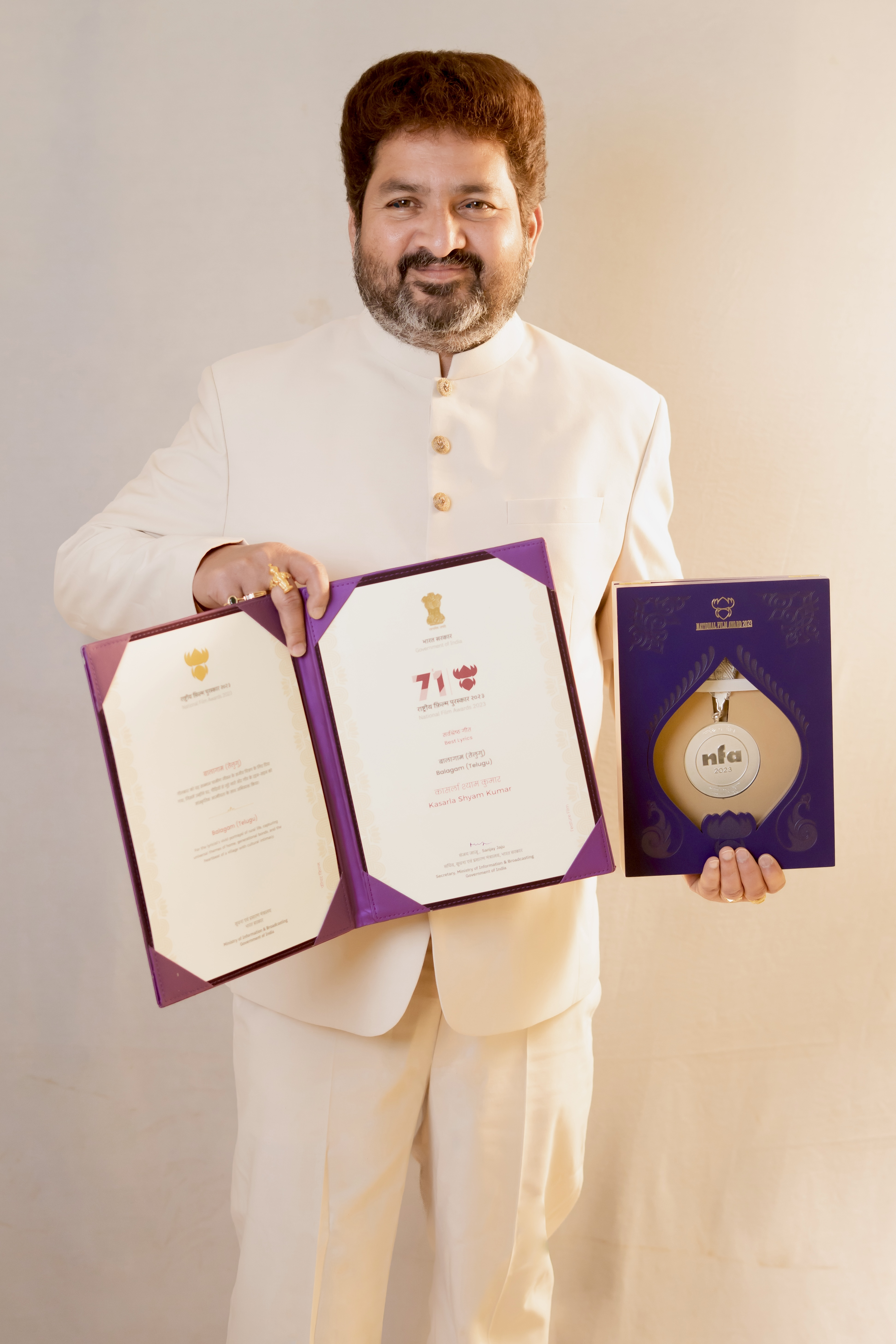
- Shyam with the National Film Award 2023
- Occupations: Composer; Music Producer; Lyricist; Singer

Kasarla Shyam is an Indian lyricist, composer, music producer, and singer who works in Telugu cinema. He made his debut as a lyric writer with Chantigadu in 2003.

Kasarla Shyam won National Film Award for Best Lyrics for "Ooru Palletooru" from Balagam which captures the essence of Telangana's village culture and the emotional bonds among its people.

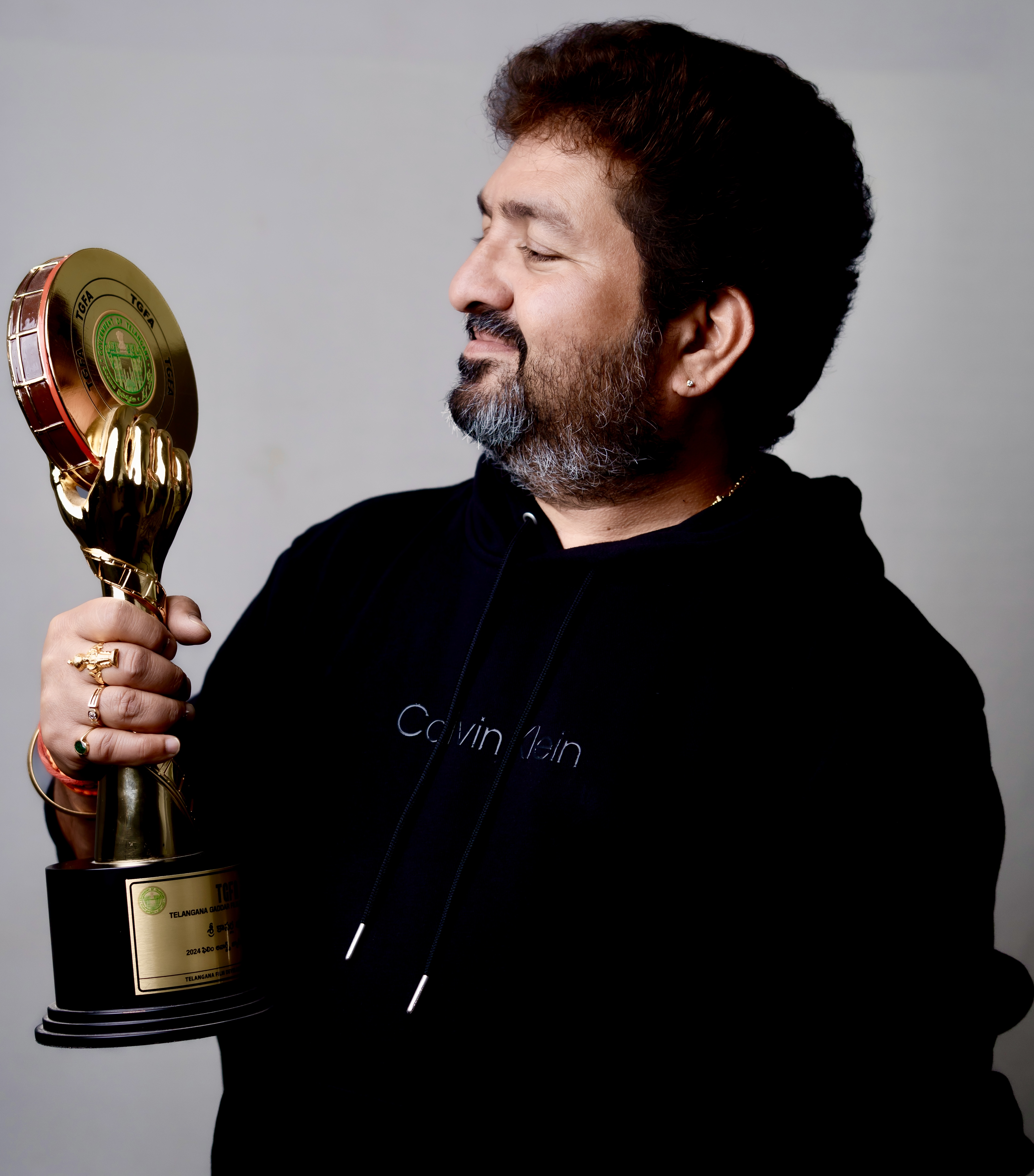
Kasarla Shyam with Telangana Gaddar Film Award 2023

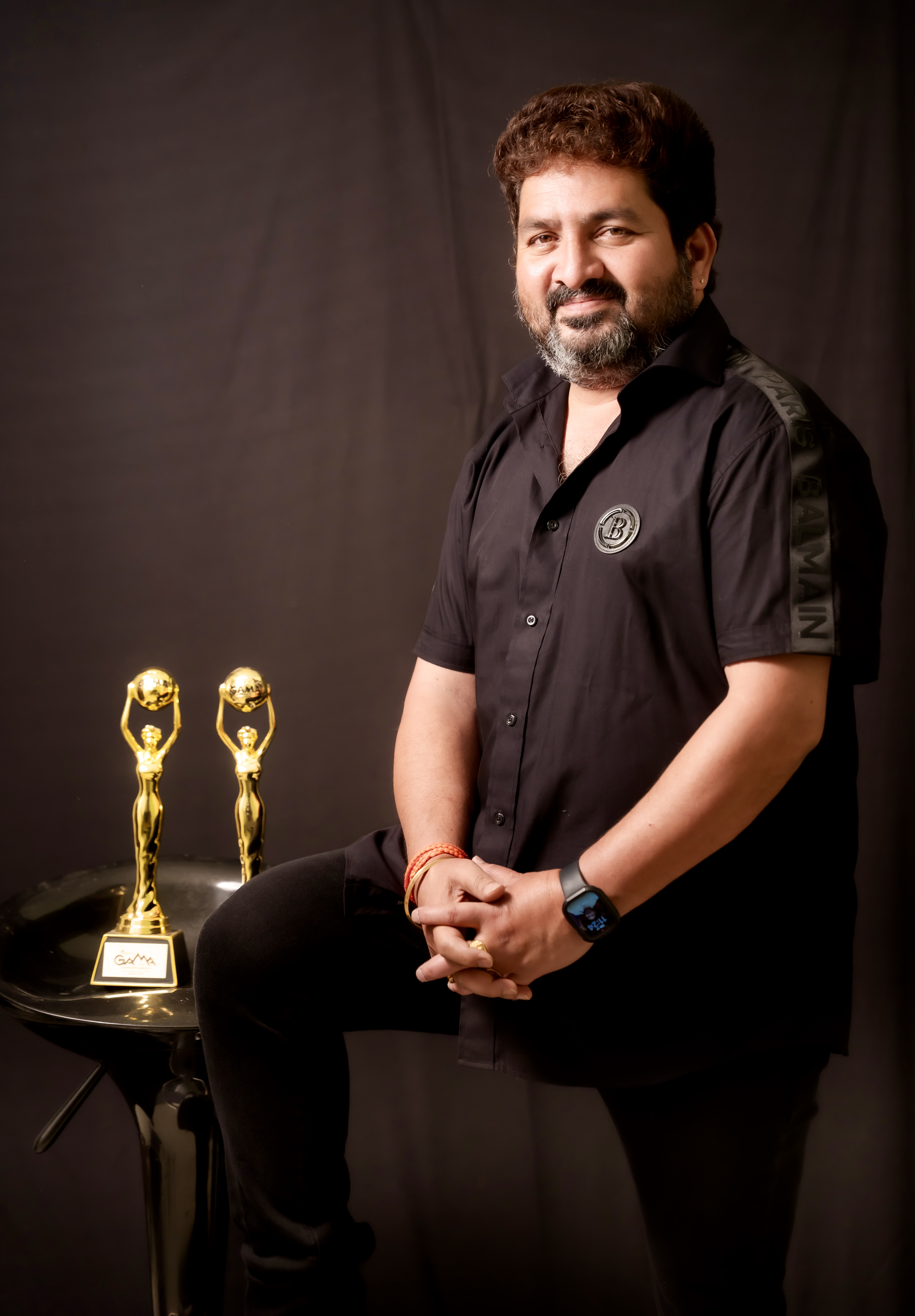
Kasarla Shyam with Gama Awards 2025

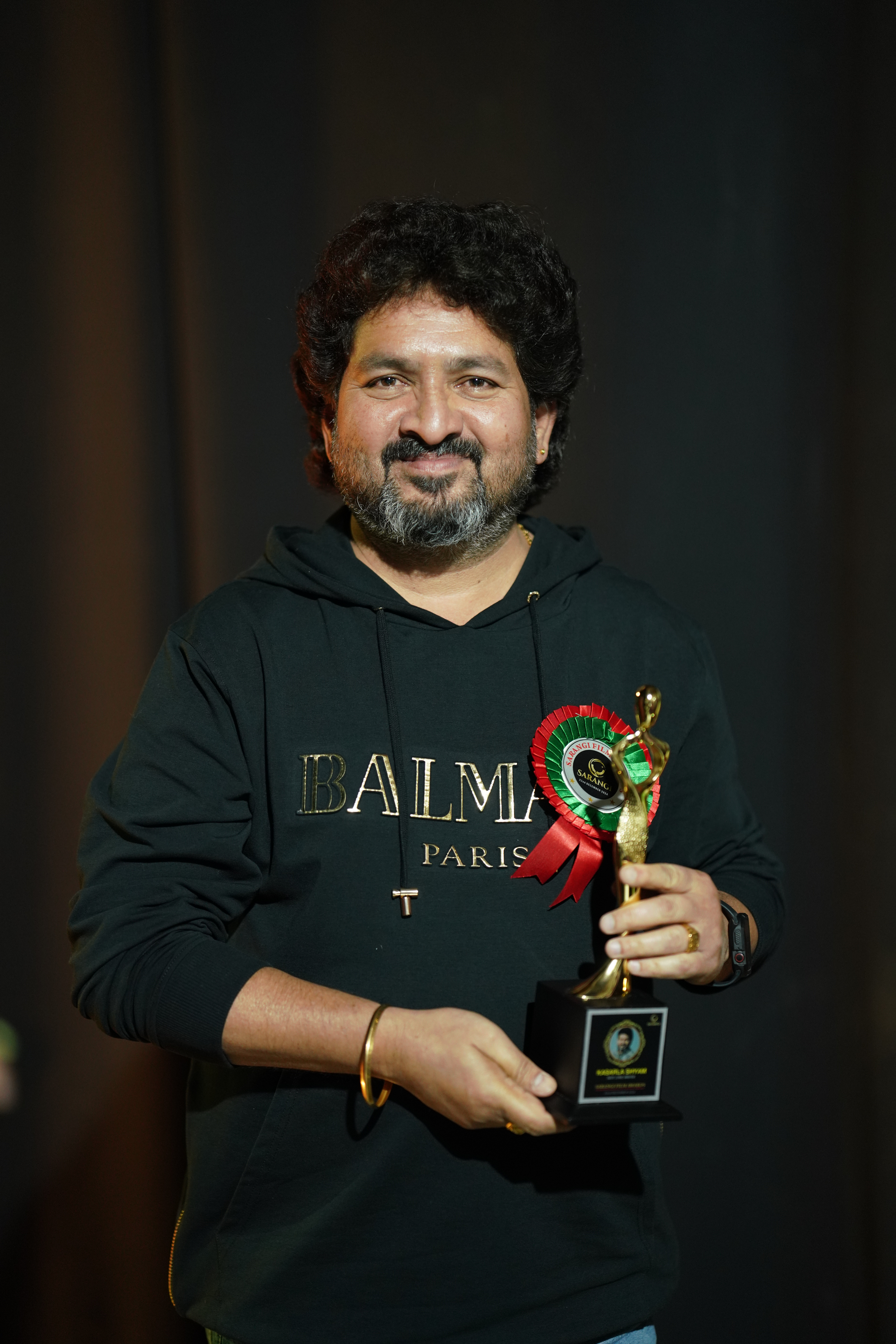
Kasarla Shyam with Sarangi Film Award 2024

Kasarla Shyam being felicitated by Deputy CM Mallu Bhatti Vikramarka at Bathukamma Young Film Makers Challenge 2026 Event in Shilpa Kala Vedika

== Discography ==
Year	Title	Song(s)	Composer	Ref(s)
2003	Chantigadu	"Kokkoroko" "Siggulolike Seethalu"	Vandemataram Srinivas	
2005	Premikulu	"Lovera Joru"	Sajan	
2009	Mahatma	"Neela Poori"	Vijay Antony	
2012	Bus Stop	"Kalalake Kanulochina"	Jeevan Babu	
2012	Maa Abbai Engineering Student	"Ninne Neeku Choopedhi"	Chinni Charan	
2013	Prema Katha Chitram	"I Just Love You Baby", "Kothagunna Haaye", "Oh My Love"	Jeevan Babu	
2013	Venkatadri Express	"Mellamellaga"	Ramana Gogula	
2014	Real Star	"Kandlallo Churukutanam"	Vandemataram Srinivas	
2014	Love You Bangaram	"Jai Shambo Shambo" "Annuvanuvuna Cheliya"	Mahith Narayan	
2014	Rowdy	All Songs	Sai Karthik	
2015	Kick 2	"Kick"	Thaman S	
2025	Daaku Maharaaj	"Dabidi Dibidi", "Sarkaru Raa"	Thaman S	
2025	Game Changer	"Arugu Meedha", "Konda Devara"	Thaman S	
2025	Retro	All Songs for Telugu Dubbed version	Santhosh Narayanan	
2025	Mad Square	"Laddu Gaani Pelli"	Bheems Ceciroleo	
2025	Bhairavam	"Gichhamaaku"	Sricharan Pakala	
2025	Solo Boy	"Solo Boy Title Song"	Judah Sandhy	
2025	Thammudu	"Chillax Song"	B. Ajaneesh Loknath	
2025	Oh Bhama Ayyo Rama	"Gully Step"	Radhan	
2025	Oka Brundavanam	"Hey Kadhile Kannulu"	Sunny – Saketh	
2025	Kothapallilo Okappudu	"Yelo Yennello", "Jai Bolo"	Radhan	
2025	Ari: My Name is Nobody	"Chinnari Kittayya", "Theme Of Ari"	Anup Rubens	
2025	Mithra Mandali	"Kattanduko Janaki"	RR Dhruvan	
2025	Santhana Prapthirasthu	"Santhana PrapthiRasthu Shubhamasthu"	Sunil Kashyap	
2025	Paanch Minar	"Mandu Tera"	Shekar Chandra	
2025	Dhandoraa	"Dhandoraa Title Song"	Mark K Robin	
2025	Akhanda 2	"Jajikaya Jajikaya"	Thaman S	
2025	Champion	"Gira Gira Gingiraagirey"	Mickey J. Meyer	
2026	Mana Shankara Vara Prasad Garu	"Mega Victory Mass"	Bheems Ceciroleo	
2026	Ustaad Bhagat Singh	"Collar Ey Eththara"	Devi Sri Prasad	
2026	Band Melam	"Ento Emo", "Ekkadi Dongalu Akkade GapChup", "Janu O My Janu"	Vijai Bulganin	
2026	Bad Boy Karthik	"Naa Maava Pillanitthaanannade"	Harris Jayaraj	
2026	The Paradise	"Aaya Sher", "Yeshanagula", "Sammakka", "Uyyalo Uyyalo (Female)", "Uyyalo Uyyalo (Male)"	Anirudh Ravichander	

== Awards and nominations ==
=== SIIMA Awards ===
Year	Work	Work	Result	Ref.
2023	Best Lyricist – Telugu	Balagam	Nominated	

=== National Film Awards ===
Year	Work	Work	Result	Ref.
2023	Best Lyrics	Balagam - "Ooru Palletooru"	Won	

=== Filmfare Awards South ===
Year	Category	Work	Result	Ref.
2024	Best Lyricist – Telugu	"Chamkeela Angeelesi" – Dasara	Nominated	
2024	Best Lyricist – Telugu	"Ooru Palletooru" – Balagam	Nominated	

=== IIFA Utsavam ===
Year	Category	Work	Result	Ref.
2024	Best Lyricist – Telugu	"Chamkeela Angeelesi" – Dasara	Nominated	
