= List of Telugu films of 2025 =

This is a list of Telugu-language films produced in Telugu cinema in India that were released in the year 2025.

== Box office collection ==
The List of highest-grossing Telugu films released in 2025, by worldwide box office gross revenue, are as follows: The rank of the films in the following table depends on the estimate of worldwide collections as reported by organizations classified as green by Wikipedia.The total collection of movies is 1580 crores. (Note: See WP:RSP, WP:ICTFSOURCES) There is no official tracking of domestic box office figures within India.

Background shading indicates that a film is currently showing in theatres worldwide.

#	Implies that the film is multilingual and the gross collection figure includes the worldwide collection of the other simultaneously filmed version.

Highest worldwide gross of 2025
Rank	Title	Production company	Worldwide gross	Ref
1	Mahavatar Narsimha (Note: There is no clear evidence of a primary language. The film's main languages are deemed to be Hindi, Kannada, Tamil and Telugu according to the Indian film censorship body.)	Kleem Productions	₹300–325 crore #	(Note: Mahavatar Narsimha's reported worldwide grosses vary between ₹300 crore (Hindustan Times, Cinema Express, News18) – ₹324.5 crore (The Economic Times) – ₹325 crore (DNA India))
2	They Call Him OG	DVV Entertainment	₹295 crore	(Note: They Call Him OG grossed ₹293.65 crore (News18; The Telegraph) – ₹294 crore (Daily News and Analysis) – ₹300 crore (The Economic Times))
3	Sankranthiki Vasthunam	Sri Venkateswara Creations	₹260 crore	(Note: The Financial Express reported ₹258 crore and NDTV, News18, The Hans India, The Hindu, The Economic Times have reported the ₹300 crore gross.)
4	Game Changer	Sri Venkateswara Creations	₹195 crore	
5	Mirai	People Media Factory	₹190 crore	
6	Kuberaa (Note: The film was produced in both the Telugu and Tamil languages)	Sree Venkateswara Cinemas LLP, Amigos Creations	₹132 crore #	(Note: Kuberaa's reported worldwide grosses vary between ₹115 crore (Hindustan Times) – ₹132 crore (The Hans India; News18))
7	Daaku Maharaaj	Sithara Entertainments, Fortune Four Cinemas, Srikara Studios	₹130 crore	
8	Akhanda 2: Thaandavam	14 Reels Plus, IVY Entertainment	₹120–128 crore	
9	HIT: The Third Case	Wall Poster Cinema, Unanimous Productions	₹120 crore	
10	Hari Hara Veera Mallu	Mega Surya Production	₹117.16 crore	

== January–March ==
Opening		Title	Director	Cast	Production company	Ref.
J A N U A R Y	2	Katha Kamamishu	Goutham–Karthik	Indraja; Karuna Kumar; Kritika Roy; Krishna Prasad; Harshini Koduru; Venkatesh Kakumanu; Stuthee Roy; Moin	iDream Media, Three Whistles Talkies	
J A N U A R Y	3	Dreamcatcher	Sandeep Kakula	Prashanth Krishna; Aneesha Dama; Srinivas Ramireddy; Aishwarrya Holakkal	Ciel Motion Pictures	
J A N U A R Y	3	Prema Charithra Krishna Vijayam	Madhusudhan Hawaldhar	Krishna; Yashwanth; Suhasini; Nagendra Babu; Ali	Amba Movies, Ram Films	
J A N U A R Y	9	Break Out	Subbu Cherukuri	Raja Goutham; Chakrapani Ananda; G. Bala; Kireeti Damaraju; Chitram Srinu	Anil Moduga Films	
J A N U A R Y	9	Neeli Megha Shyama	Ravi S Varmaa	Vishwadev Rachakonda; Payal Radhakrishna	Moonshine Entertainments	
J A N U A R Y	10	Game Changer	S. Shankar	Ram Charan; Kiara Advani; Anjali; S. J. Suryah; Srikanth	Sri Venkateswara Creations	
J A N U A R Y	12	Daaku Maharaaj	Bobby Kolli	Nandamuri Balakrishna; Bobby Deol; Shraddha Srinath	Sithara Entertainments, Fortune Four Cinemas	
J A N U A R Y	14	Sankranthiki Vasthunam	Anil Ravipudi	Venkatesh; Meenakshi Chaudhary; Aishwarya Rajesh	Sri Venkateswara Creations	
J A N U A R Y	23	Wife Off	Bhanu Yerubandi	Divya Sree Gurugubelli; Abhinav Manikanta; Nikhil Gajula	Tamada Media	
J A N U A R Y	24	Gandhi Tatha Chettu	Padmavathi Malladi	Sukriti Veni Bandreddi; Anand Chakrapani; Rag Mayur	Mythri Movie Makers, Sukumar Writings, Gopi Talkies	
J A N U A R Y	24	Hathya	Srividya Basawa	Dhanya Balakrishna; Ravi Varma; Pooja Ramachandran	Mahaakaal Pictures	
J A N U A R Y	24	Thalli Manasu	V. Sreenivas	Rachitha Mahalakshmi; Kamal Kamaraju; Aadarsh Balakrishna	Muthyala Movie Makers	
J A N U A R Y	30	Pothugadda	Raksha Veeram	Shatru; Aadukalam Naren; Prudhvi Dandamudi; Vismaya Sri	24 Cinema Street	
J A N U A R Y	31	Coffee with a Killer	R. P. Patnaik	Temper Vamsi; Ravi Prakash; Siva Karthik; Srinivasa Reddy; Ravi Babu	Sevenhills Productions	
J A N U A R Y	31	Racharikam	Suresh Lankalapalli	Vijay Shankar; Apsara Rani; Varun Sandesh; Vijay Ram Raju	Chill Bross Entertainment	
F E B R U A R Y	7	Bhavani Ward 1997	GD Narasimmha	Gayathri Gupta; Ganesh Reddy; Pooja Kendre; Sai Satish; Jabardasth Apparo	GDR Motion Picture	
F E B R U A R Y	7	Oka Padhakam Prakaram	Vinod Vijayan	Sairam Shankar; Samuthirakani; Ashima Narwal; Shruti Sodhi	Vinod Vijayan Films, Vihari Cinema House	
F E B R U A R Y	7	Thandel	Chandoo Mondeti	Naga Chaitanya; Sai Pallavi	Geetha Arts	
F E B R U A R Y	14	Brahma Anandam	RVS Nikhil	Raja Goutham; Brahmanandam; Vennela Kishore; Priya Vadlamani	Swadharm Entertainments	
F E B R U A R Y	14	Laila	Ram Narayan	Vishwak Sen; Akansha Sharma	Shine Screens	
F E B R U A R Y	14	Nidurinchu Jahapana	Prasanna Kumar Devarapalli	Aanand Vardhan; Navami Gayak; Roshni Sahota	AR Entertainments	
F E B R U A R Y	14	Thala	Amma Rajasekhar	Amma Raagin Raj; Ankitha Naskar; Ester Noronha; Satyam Rajesh	Deepa Arts	
F E B R U A R Y	21	Baapu	Daya	Brahmaji; Aamani; Kethiri Sudhakar Reddy; Dhanya Balakrishna	Comrade Film Factory, Atheera Productions	
F E B R U A R Y	21	Ramam Raghavam	Dhanraj	Samuthirakani; Dhanraj; Satya; Sunil; Srinivas Reddy	Slate Pencil Stories	
F E B R U A R Y	26	Mazaka	Trinadha Rao Nakkina	Sundeep Kishan; Ritu Varma; Rao Ramesh; Anshu; Murali Sharma	AK Entertainments, Hasya Movies, Zee Studios	
F E B R U A R Y	27	Takita Tadimi Tandana	Raj Lohith	Ganaaditya; Priya Kommineni; Gangavva; Jaya Naidu Maida; Satish Saripalli	Yellow Mango Entertainment	
F E B R U A R Y	28	Bandi	Tirumala Raghu	Aditya Om	Gully Cinema	
F E B R U A R Y	28	Guard	Jaga Peddi	Viraj Reddy Cheelam; Mimi Leonard	Anu Productions	
F E B R U A R Y	28	Nenekkaduna	Madhav Kodad	Mimoh Chakraborty; Sasha Chettri; Posani Krishna Murali; Tanikella Bharani	Ajagava Arts	
M A R C H	7	14 Days Girlfriend Intlo	Sriharsha Manne	Ankith Koyya; Shriya Kontham; Vennela Kishore	Satya Arts Entertainment	
M A R C H	7	Jigel	Malli Yeluri	Thrigun; Megha Chowdhury	Sri Indira Combines, Apple Creations	
M A R C H	7	Naari: The Women	Surya Vantipalli	Aamani; Vikas Vasishta; Mounika Reddy; Nitya Sri; Karthikeya Dev	SHE Films, Hyderabad Studios	
M A R C H	7	Neerukulla 35km	Ramesh Plassi	RK Maste; Riddhi Oberoi	Bitla Films	
M A R C H	7	Pourusham	Sheraz Mehdi	Sheraz Mehdi; Suman; Ravi Varma	UVT Studios, Shriya Productions	
M A R C H	7	Raa Raja	B. Shivaprasad	Sugi Vijay; Mounika	Shree Padmini Cinemas	
M A R C H	7	Legally Veer	Ravi Gogula	Malikireddy Veer Reddy, Priyanka Rewri		
M A R C H	7	Shivangi Lioness	Devaraj Bharani Dharan	Anandhi; Varalaxmi Sarathkumar	First Copy Movies	
M A R C H	7	Viral Prapancham	Brijesh Tangi	Priyanka Sharma; Nitya Shetty; Sai Ronak; Sunny Naveen	Revolutionary Talkies, Anil Moduga Films	
M A R C H	7	W/O Anirvesh	Ganga Sapthasikhara	Ram Prasad; Gemini Suresh; Nazia Khan; Sai Prasanna	Gajendra Productions	
M A R C H	14	1000 Waala	Afzal Shaik	Amith Dream Star; Sharukh Baig; Navitha Gangat; Mukhtar Khan	Superhit Movie Makers	
M A R C H	14	Court	Ram Jagadeesh	Priyadarshi Pulikonda; Harsh Roshan; Sridevi; Sivaji	Wall Poster Cinema	
M A R C H	14	Dilruba	Viswa Karun	Kiran Abbavaram; Rukshar Dhillon; Kathy Davison	Sivam Celluloids, Yoodlee Films	
M A R C H	14	Raakshasa	Kashi K	Chintalapudi Venkatt; Sandhya Thota; Bahubali Prabhakar; Chatrapathi Sekhar	Unique Media	
M A R C H	14	Lamp	Rajashekar Raj	Vinod Nuvvula; Avantika Jo; Madhupriya; Koti Kiran	Charitha Cinema Arts	
M A R C H	21	Anaganaga Australia Lo	Taraka Rama	Jyothinath Goud; Saanya Bhatnagar	Sahaana Art Creations	
M A R C H	21	Artiste	Ratanrishi	Santosh Kalwacherla; Krisheka Patel	Sjk Entertainment	
M A R C H	21	Kaalamega Karigindhi	Singara Mohan	Vinay Kumar; Shravani Majjari; Aravind Mudigonda; Nomina Tara	Singaara Creative Works	
M A R C H	21	Pelli Kani Prasad	Abhilash Reddy	Saptagiri; Priyanka Sharma	Thama Media	
M A R C H	21	Tuk Tuk	Supreeth C Krishna	Harsh Roshan; Karthikeya Dev; Madhu Sudhan Rapeti	Chithravaahini Productions, RYG Cinemas	
M A R C H	21	Shanmukha	Shanumugam Sappani	Aadi Saikumar; Avika Gor	Sapbro Productions	
M A R C H	28	Robinhood	Venky Kudumula	Nithiin; Sreeleela; Vennela Kishore	Mythri Movie Makers	
M A R C H	28	Mad Square	Kalyan Shankar	Narne Nithin; Sangeeth Sobhan; Ram Nitin	Sithara Entertainments, Fortune Four Cinemas, Srikara Studios	

== April–June ==
Opening		Title	Director	Cast	Production company	Ref.
A P R I L	4	28 Degree Celsius	Anil Viswanath	Naveen Chandra; Shalini Vadnikatti	Veeranjaneya Productions, Riverside Cinemas	
A P R I L	4	LYF: Love Your Father	Pavan Ketharaju	Sri Harsha; S. P. Charan; Kashika Kapoor	Manisha Arts and Media, Annapareddy Studios	
A P R I L	10	Jack	Bhaskar	Siddhu Jonnalagadda; Vaishnavi Chaitanya	Sri Venkateswara Cine Chitra	
A P R I L	11	Akkada Ammayi Ikkada Abbayi	Nitin–Bharath	Pradeep Machiraju; Deepika Pilli	Monks & Monkeys	
A P R I L	11	Cherasaala	Ram Prakash Gunnam	Ram Prakash Gunnam; Srijith; Nishkala; Ramya	S Rai Creations	
A P R I L	11	Premaku Jai	Srinivas Mallam	Anil Buragani; R Jwalitha	Eswara Parameswara Creations	
A P R I L	17	Odela 2	Ashok Teja	Tamannaah Bhatia; Hebah Patel; Vasishta N. Simha	Madhu Creations, Sampath Nandi Teamworks	
A P R I L	18	Arjun Son of Vyjayanthi	Pradeep Chilukuri	Nandamuri Kalyan Ram; Vijayashanti; Saiee Manjrekar; Sohail Khan	Ashoka Creations, N. T. R. Arts	
A P R I L	18	Dear Uma	Sai Rajesh Mahadev	Pruthvi Ambaar; Sumaya Reddy	Suma Chitra Arts	
A P R I L	18	Jagamerigina Satyam	Tirupathi Pale	Avinash Verma; Aadya Reddy; Neelima Pathakamasetty	Amrutha Satyanarayana Creations	
A P R I L	18	Madhuram	Rajesh Chikile	Uday Raj; Vaishnavee Singh	Neo Studios, GK Media	
A P R I L	25	Chaurya Paatham	Nikhil Gollamari	Indhra Ram; Payala Radhakrishna	Nakkina Narratives	
A P R I L	25	Sarangapani Jathakam	Mohana Krishna Indraganti	Priyadarshi Pulikonda; Roopa Koduvayur	Sridevi Movies	
A P R I L	25	Sodara	Manmohan Menampalley	Sampoornesh Babu; Sanjosh	Cans Entertainment	
A P R I L	25	Suryapet Junction	Rajesh Nadendla	Eeswar; Naina Sarwar; Abhimanyu Singh	Yoga Lakshmi Art Creations	
A P R I L	25	ALCC	Leleedhar Rao Kola	Srikar Komanduri; J P Naveen; Sham Nayak	L R Film Circuits	
A P R I L	25	Shiva Shambho	Renigunta Narsing	Suman; Tanikella Bharani; Doraveti Chenayya	Anantha Arts	
M A Y	1	HIT: The Third Case	Sailesh Kolanu	Nani; Srinidhi Shetty; Rao Ramesh; Tisca Chopra	Wall Poster Cinema, Unanimous Productions	
M A Y	9	Blind Spot	Rakesh Varma	Naveen Chandra; Ali Reza; Rashi Singh; Ravi Varma	Mango Mass Media	
M A Y	9	Common Man Pellam	Gaddam Ramana Reddy	Indraja; Ajay; Jayasudha; Suman; Rupa Lakshmi; Muralidhar Goud	RK Cinemas	
M A Y	9	Kaliyugam 2064	Pramodh Sundar	Shraddha Srinath; Kishore; Iniyan Subramani; Asmal	RK International, Prime Cinemas	
M A Y	9	Single	Caarthick Raju	Sree Vishnu; Ketika Sharma; Ivana	Geetha Arts, Kalya Films	
M A Y	9	Subham	Praveen Kandregula	Harshith Reddy; Gavireddy Srinivas; Charan Peri; Shriya Kontham; Shravani Lakshmi; Shalini Kondepudi	Tralala Moving Pictures, Kanakavalli Talkies	
M A Y	15	Anaganaga	Sunny Sanjay	Sumanth; Kajal Choudhary; Viharsh	Krishi Entertainments	
M A Y	16	23 Iravai Moodu	Raj Rachakonda	Teja; Tanmai; Jhansi; Pawon Ramesh; Thagubothu Ramesh; Praneeth	Studio 99	
M A Y	16	Eleven	Lokkesh Ajls	Naveen Chandra; Reyaa Hari; Shashank	AR Entertainment	
M A Y	16	Triguni	Vaithahavya Vadlamani	Kushal Yella; Prerna Chowdhary; Subbu Chandragiri; Anudeep Sharma	Mahi Media Works, Vamsi Writings	
M A Y	22	Veeraaraju 1991	Ruudra Viraaj	Ruudra Viraaj; Ajay Ghosh; Banerjee; Goparaju Ramana; Archana	Royal Star Productionss	
M A Y	23	Oka Brundavanam	Sathya Botcha	Balu; Shinnova; Sanvitha	Seer Studios	
M A Y	23	Vaibhavam	Sathvik	Ruthvik; Iqra Idrisi; Raghu G; Ananth Athreya	Rama Devi Productions	
M A Y	30	Bhairavam	Vijay Kanakamedala	Bellamkonda Sreenivas; Nara Rohith; Manchu Manoj; Aditi Shankar; Anandhi	Sri Sathya Sai Arts	
M A Y	30	Shashtipoorthi	Pavan Prabha	Rajendra Prasad; Archana; Rupeysh Choudhary; Aakanksha Singh	Maa Aaie Productions	
M A Y	30	X Roads	Shashi Preetam	Snehal Kamat; Ajit Shukla; Anirudh Mantripragada; Santosh Anantharaman	Aishwarya Krishna Priya Production	
M A Y	31	Ghatikachalam	Amar Kamepalli	Nikhil Devadula; Prabhakar Podakandla; Jogi Naidu; Aarvika Gupta	Oasis Entertainment	
J U N E	6	Badmashulu	Shankar Cheguri	Mahesh Chinthala; Vidyasagar Karampuri; Muralidhar Goud	Thara Story Tellers	
J U N E	6	Gamblers	KSK Chaitanya	Sangeeth Sobhan; Prashanthi Charuolinga	Reshmas Studios, Snap & Clap Entertainments	
J U N E	6	Paderu 12th Mile	Nooka Sahibu	Satyam Rajesh; Shravan; Prabhakar; Sameer; Suhana	Sai Lakshmi Ganapati Creations	
J U N E	6	Sri Sri Sri Raja Vaaru	Satish Vegesna	Narne Nithiin; Sampada Hulivana; Naresh; Rao Ramesh	Sri Vedakshara Movies	
J U N E	20	Kuberaa	Sekhar Kammula	Dhanush; Nagarjuna; Rashmika Mandanna	Sree Venkateswara Cinemas LLP, Amigos Creations	
J U N E	20	8 Vasantalu	Phanindra Narsetti	Ananthika Sanilkumar; Hanu Reddy; Raviteja Duggirala	Mythri Movie Makers	
J U N E	27	Kannappa	Mukesh Kumar Singh	Vishnu Manchu; Mohan Babu; R. Sarathkumar; Preity Mukhundhan	AVA Entertainment, 24 Frames Factory	

== July–September ==
Opening		Title	Director	Cast	Production company	Ref.
J U L Y	4	Thammudu	Venu Sriram	Nithiin; Sapthami Gowda; Laya; Varsha Bollamma	Sri Venkateswara Creations	
J U L Y	4	Uppu Kappurambu	Ani I. V. Sasi	Suhas; Keerthy Suresh	Ellanar Films	
J U L Y	4	Show Time	Madhan Dakshinamurthy	Naveen Chandra; Kamakshi Bhaskarla; Naresh; Raja Ravindra	SkyLine Movies	
J U L Y	4	Solo Boy	P. Naveen Kumar	Gautham Krishna; Shweta Avasthi; Ramya Pasupuleti	Sevenhills Productions	
J U L Y	5	Lopaliki Ra Cheptha	Konda Venkata Rajendra	Konda Venkata Rajendra; Manisha Jashnani; Sushmita Anala; Sancharai	Mass Bunk Movies	
J U L Y	11	The 100	Raghav Omkar Sasidhar	Sagar; Misha Narang; Dhanya Balakrishna	Kria Film Corp, Dhamma Productions	
J U L Y	11	Dheerga Ayushman Bhava	M. Purnanand	Karthik Raju; Mishti Chakraborty; Nagineedu; Aamani; Y. Kasi Viswanath; Satyam Rajesh; Getup Srinu; Thagubothu Ramesh; Noel Sean; Gundu Sudarshan; Prudhvi Raj	Tripura Creations	
J U L Y	11	Oh Bhama Ayyo Rama	Ram Godhala	Suhas; Malavika Manoj; Ali	V Arts	
J U L Y	11	Paramapadha Sopanam	Naga Shiva	Ambati Arjun; Jennifer Immanuel	S Media	
J U L Y	11	Virgin Boys	Dayanandh Gaddam	Geetanand; Mitraaw Sharma; Shrihan; Ronith; Kaushal Manda	Rajguru Films	
J U L Y	18	Junior (Note: The film was produced in both the Telugu and Kannada languages)	Radha Krishna Reddy	Kireeti Reddy; Sreeleela; Genelia D'Souza	Vaaraahi Chalana Chitram	
J U L Y	18	Kothapallilo Okappudu	Praveena Paruchuri	Manoj Chandra; Monika T; Usha Bonela	Paruchuri Vijaya Praveena Arts	
J U L Y	18	Police Vari Heccharika	Babji	Sunny Akhil; Subhalekha Sudhakar; Ajay Ghosh; Jaya Vahini; Himaja; Sayaji Shinde; Ravi Kale; Y. Kasi Viswanath; Tulasi	Thoolikaa Tanishq Creations	
J U L Y	18	Veede Mana Varasudu	Ramesh Uppu	Lavanya Reddy; Ramesh Uppu; Saameta Gandhi; Vijay Rangaraju	RS Arts	
J U L Y	24	Hari Hara Veera Mallu	Krish; Jyothi Krishna	Pawan Kalyan; Bobby Deol; Nidhhi Agerwal	Mega Surya Production	
J U L Y	25	Mahavatar Narsimha	Ashwin Kumar	Animated characters	Kleem Productions; Hombale Films	
J U L Y	31	Kingdom	Gowtam Tinnanuri	Vijay Deverakonda; Satyadev; Bhagyashri Borse	Sithara Entertainments, Fortune Four Creations, Srikara Studios	
A U G U S T	1	Thank You Dear	Thota Srikanth Kumar	Dhanush Raghumudri; Hebah Patel; Rekha Nirosha	Mahalakshmi Productions	
A U G U S T	8	Balu Gadi Love Story	L. Srinivaas Thej	Akula Akhiil; Dharshika Menon	Bhaamas Creations	
A U G U S T	8	Bakasura Restaurant	SJ Shiva	Praveen; Harsha Chemudu; Jai Krishna; Vivek Varma Dandu; Amar Lathu; Ram Patas; Shining Phani	SJ Movies	
A U G U S T	8	Bhalare Sitram	Lakshma Reddy Tumma	Shiva Rajput; Divya Dicholkar; Kosuri Mounika Rani; Vinjarapu Krishna; Panddu Chelimi	AR Entertainments	
A U G U S T	8	Maathru	John Jakki	Sriram; Nandini Rai; Sugi Vijay; Rupali Bushan; Ali; Aamani; Ravi Kale; Devi Prasad	Shree Padmini Cinemas	
A U G U S T	8	Raju Gaani Savaal	Ravinder Lelijala	Ravinder Lelijala; Sandhya Rathod; Rittika Chakraborty; Ravinder Bommakanti	LR Productions	
A U G U S T	22	Meghalu Cheppina Prema Katha	Vipin	Naresh Agastya; Rabiya Khatoon	Sunethra Entertainment	
A U G U S T	22	Paradha	Praveen Kandregula	Anupama Parameswaran; Darshana Rajendran; Sangeetha Krish	Ananda Media	
A U G U S T	22	University	R. Narayana Murthy	R. Narayana Murthy; Krishneswara Rao		
A U G U S T	27	Kanya Kumari	Srujan Attada	Geeth Saini; Sreecharan Rachakonda	Radical Pictures	
A U G U S T	27	Spruha: The Blackout	Srireddy Mallidi	Vinay; Yamini; Kanchan Bamne; Sonia Naidu	JK Entertainments	
A U G U S T	27	Sundarakanda	Venkatesh Nimmalapudi	Nara Rohith; Sridevi Vijaykumar; Virti Vaghani	Sandeep Picture Palace	
A U G U S T	29	Arjun Chakravarthy	Vikrant Rudra	Vijaya Rama Raju; Sijaa Rose; Ajay	Gannet Celluloid	
A U G U S T	29	Tribanadhari Barbarik	Mohan Srivatsa	Sathyaraj; Vasishta N. Simha; Satyam Rajesh; Udaya Bhanu	Vaanara Celluloid	
S E P T E M B E R	5	Ghaati	Krish Jagarlamudi	Anushka Shetty; Vikram Prabhu; Chaitanya Rao Madadi	First Frame Entertainments	
S E P T E M B E R	5	Little Hearts	Sai Marthand	Mouli Tanuj Prasanth; Shivani Nagaram	Bunny Vas Works, Vamsi Nandipati Entertainments, Bairagi Kathalu, ETV Win	
S E P T E M B E R	12	Kishkindhapuri	Koushik Pegallapati	Bellamkonda Sai Sreenivas; Anupama Parameswaran	Shine Screens	
S E P T E M B E R	12	Mirai	Karthik Gattamneni	Teja Sajja; Manoj Manchu; Ritika Nayak	People Media Factory	
S E P T E M B E R	19	Beauty	J S S Vardhan	Ankith Koyya; Nilakhi Patra; Naresh	Vanara Celluloid, Zee Studios, A Maruthi Team Product	
S E P T E M B E R	19	Daksha	Vamsee Krishna Malla	Mohan Babu; Lakshmi Manchu; Viswant Duddumpudi; P. Samuthirakani; Siddique	Sree Lakshmi Prasanna Pictures, Manchu Entertainment	
S E P T E M B E R	19	Ilanti Cinema Meereppudu Chusundaru	Super Raja	Super Raja; Vamshi Gone; Chandana; Deepthi; Ramya	Raja Productions	
S E P T E M B E R	25	They Call Him OG	Sujeeth	Pawan Kalyan; Emraan Hashmi; Priyanka Mohan; Arjun Das	DVV Entertainment	

== October–December ==
Opening		Title	Director	Cast	Production company	Ref.
O C T O B E R	10	Ari: My Name is Nobody	Jayashankarr	Sai Kumar; Subhalekha Sudhakar; Anasuya; Srikanth; Harsha	Arvy Cinemas; Sree Cinema Studios	
O C T O B E R	10	Constable	Aryan Subhan	Varun Sandesh; Madhulika Varanasi	Jagruthi Movie Makers	
O C T O B E R	10	Mutton Soup	Ramachandra Vattikuti	Raman Reddy Korivi; Varsha Viswanath; Gemini Suresh	Alukka Studios	
O C T O B E R	10	Sasivadane	Sai Mohan Ubbana	Rakshit Atluri; Komalee Prasad	AG Film Company	
O C T O B E R	16	Mithra Mandali	Vijayendar S	Priyadarshi Pulikonda; Niharika NM; Rag Mayur; Vishnu Oi	Sapta Aswa Media Works, Vyra Entertainments	
O C T O B E R	17	Telusu Kada	Neeraja Kona	Siddhu Jonnalagadda; Raashii Khanna; Srinidhi Shetty	People Media Factory	
O C T O B E R	18	K-Ramp	Jains Nani	Kiran Abbavaram; Yukti Thareja	Hasya Movies, Ruudransh Celluloid	
O C T O B E R	24	Vidhrohi	Venkata Subramanyam	Shivakumar Ramachandravapu; Ravi Prakash; Charishma Sreekar; Thagubothu Ramesh; Madhunandan	AJ Magic Movies, IBM Movies	
O C T O B E R	31	Baahubali: The Epic	S. S. Rajamouli	Prabhas; Rana Daggubati; Anushka Shetty	Arka Media Works	
O C T O B E R	31	Karmanye Vadhikaraste	Amardeep Challapalli	Brahmaji; Shatru; Mahendran	Ushaswini Films	
O C T O B E R	31	Mass Jathara	Bhanu Bhogavarapu	Ravi Teja; Sreeleela	Sithara Entertainments, Fortune Four Cinemas, Srikara Studios	
N O V E M B E R	7	Chiranjeeva	Abhinaya Krishna	Raj Tarun; Kushitha Kallapu	Streamline Productions, Aha	
N O V E M B E R	7	Jatadhara (Note: The film was produced in both the Telugu and Hindi languages)	Venkat Kalyan; Abhishek Jaiswal	Sudheer Babu; Sonakshi Sinha; Divya Khosla Kumar	Ess Kay Gee Entertainment	
N O V E M B E R	7	Krishna Leela	Devan	Devan; Dhanya Balakrishna	Mahasen Visuals	
N O V E M B E R	7	Premistunnaa	Bhanu Shankar	Sathvik Varma; Preethi Neha	IBM Production House LLP	
N O V E M B E R	7	The Girlfriend	Rahul Ravindran	Rashmika Mandanna; Dheekshith Shetty	Dheeraj Mogilineni Entertainments, Mass Movie Makers	
N O V E M B E R	7	The Great Pre-Wedding Show	Rahul Srinivas	Thiruveer; Teena Sravya; Rohan Roy	7M Productions, Puppet Show Productions	
N O V E M B E R	13	Yenugu Thondam Ghatikachalam	Ravi Babu	Naresh; Varshini Sounderajan	Flying Frogs, ETV Win	
N O V E M B E R	14	Cmantham	Sudhakar Paani	Vajrayogi; Shreya Bharti	TR Dream Productions	
N O V E M B E R	14	Gopi Galla Goa Trip	Rohit Penumatsa	Ajith Mohan; Raju Shivarathri	Raasta Films, Aurelis Arts, Awwal Number, Avanti Cinema	
N O V E M B E R	14	Jigris	Harish Reddy Uppula	Krishna Burugula; Ram Nitin; Mani Vaka; Dheeraj Athreya	Mount Meru Pictures	
N O V E M B E R	14	Love OTP	Aniissh Tejeshwar	Aniissh Tejeshwar; Rajeev Kanakala; Swaroopini; Jahnvika Kalakeri	Bhavaprita Productions	
N O V E M B E R	14	Rolugunta Suri	Anil Kumar Palla	Nagarjuna Palla; Aadhya Reddy	Tapasvi Art Creations	
N O V E M B E R	14	Santhana Prapthirasthu	Sanjeev Reddy	Vikranth Reddy; Chandini Chowdary	Madhura Entertainment, Nirvi Arts	
N O V E M B E R	14	Seetha Prayanam Krishna Tho	Devender	Dinesh; B. Roja Bharathi	Kushi Talkies	
N O V E M B E R	21	12A Railway Colony	Nani Kasaragadda	Allari Naresh; Kamakshi Bhaskarla	Srinivasaa Silver Screen	
N O V E M B E R	21	Itlu Mee Yedava	Thrinadh Katari	Thrinadh Katari; Sahithi Avancha; Devi Prasad; Goparaju Ramana; Tanikella Bharani	Sanjeevani Productions	
N O V E M B E R	21	Happy Journey	Chaithanya Konda	Hariharan Kone; Tejaswi Ishani Ghosh	Future Bright Films	
N O V E M B E R	21	Paanch Minar	Ram Kadumula	Raj Tarun; Rashi Singh	Connect Movies	
N O V E M B E R	21	Premante	Navaneeth Sriram	Priyadarshi Pulikonda; Anandhi	Sree Venkateswara Cinemas	
N O V E M B E R	21	Premalo Rendosaari	Saailu Kampati	Ramana Sake; Vanitha Gowda	Siddha Creations	
N O V E M B E R	21	Raju Weds Rambai	Saailu Kampati	Akhil Raj Uddemari; Tejaswi Rao	Dholamukhi Subaltern Films, Mission Tales, ETV Win	
N O V E M B E R	28	Andhaka	Devaraj Peddinti	Aryan Baer; Anand Raj Bethi; Siri Jupalli; Sai Sohan	Baer Productions	
N O V E M B E R	28	Andhra King Taluka	Mahesh Babu P	Ram Pothineni; Upendra; Bhagyashri Borse	Mythri Movie Makers	
N O V E M B E R	28	Maruva Tarama	Chaitanya Varma Nadimpalli	Hariish Dhanunjaya; Athulya Chandra; Avantika Nalwa; Rohini	Silver Screen Pictures	
N O V E M B E R	28	Not All Movies Are The Same: Dual	Suresh Sagiraju	Vallabh Teja; Soundarya Ramdas; Rexon Raj; Raghu Vardhan		
D E C E M B E R	12	Akhanda 2: Thaandavam	Boyapati Srinu	Nandamuri Balakrishna; Aadhi Pinisetty; Samyuktha	14 Reels Plus, IVY Entertainment	
D E C E M B E R	12	Drive	Jenuse Mohamed	Aadhi Pinisetty; Madonna Sebastian	Bhavya Creations	
D E C E M B E R	13	Mowgli	Sandeep Raj	Roshan Kanakala; Sakshi Mhadolkar; Bandi Saroj Kumar	People Media Factory	
D E C E M B E R	19	Divya Drusthi	Kabir Lal	Sunil; Isha Chawla; Kamal Kamaraju; Nizhalgal Ravi; Tulasi	Lovely World Entertainment	
D E C E M B E R	19	Failure Boys	Venkata Reddy	Avitej; Pradeep Kumar; Arjun Ambati; Koyal Das; Supoorna	Sri Guru Dhakshina Murthy Films	
D E C E M B E R	19	Fighter Shiva	Prabhas Nimmala	Manikanth; Ayra Bansal; Kajal; Koyal Das; Sunil; Vikas Vasishta; Madhusudhan Rao; Laxman Meesala	Aruna Giri Arts, Koundinya Productions	
D E C E M B E R	19	Gurram Paapi Reddy	Murali Manohar	Naresh Agastya; Faria Abdullah	MJM Motion Pictures, Bura & Saddi Creative Arts LLP	
D E C E M B E R	19	Mario	Kalyanji Gogana	Hebah Patel; Anirudh Sreevatsav; Rakendu Mouli	Silver Screen Productions, Kalyanji Content Pictures, Rizwan Entertainment	
D E C E M B E R	19	Missterious	Mahi Komatireddy	Rohit Sahni; Riya Kapoor; Bala Rajwadi	Ashley Creations	
D E C E M B E R	25	Bad Girlz	Phani Pradeep	Anchal Gowda; Payal Chengappa; Roshini; Yashna	Prashvitha Entertai9ment, Neeli Neeli Aakasam Creations, NVL Creations	
D E C E M B E R	25	Champion	Pradeep Advaitham	Roshan Meka; Anaswara Rajan	Swapna Cinema, Anandi Art Creations, Zee Studios	
D E C E M B E R	25	Dhandoraa	Muralikanth Devasoth	Sivaji; Navdeep; Nandu; Bindu Madhavi	Loukya Entertainments	
D E C E M B E R	25	Eesha	Srinivas Manne	Thrigun; Hebah Patel; Akhil Raj; Siri Hanmanth	HVR Productions	
D E C E M B E R	25	Patang	Praneeth Prattipati	Pranav Kaushik; Preethi Pagadala; Vamsi Pujit	Cinematic Elements, Rishaan Cinemas	
D E C E M B E R	25	Shambhala	Ugandhar Muni	Aadi Saikumar; Archana Iyer; Swasika	Shining Pictures	
D E C E M B E R	25	Vrusshabha (Note: The film was produced in both the Telugu and Malayalam languages)	Nanda Kishore	Mohanlal; Samarjit Lankesh; Nayan Sarika	Connekkt Media, Balaji Motion Pictures, Abishek S Vyas Studios	

== See also ==
- Lists of Telugu-language films
- List of Telugu films of 2024
- List of Telugu films of 2026
