= SIIMA Award for Best Debut Director – Telugu =

Indian film award

- Awarded for: Best Debut Direction Achievement in Telugu cinema
- Country: India
- Presented by: Vibri Media Group
- First award: 21 June 2012 (for films released in 2011)
- Most recent winner: Ram Jagadeesh, Court: State vs a Nobody (2025)

SIIMA Award for Best Debut Director – Telugu is presented by Vibri media group as part of its annual South Indian International Movie Awards, for best film direction done by a debut director in Telugu films. The award was first given in 2012 for films released in 2011.

== Superlatives ==
Categories	Recipient	Record
Youngest winner	Sujeeth	Age 25 (4th SIIMA)
Oldest winner	Maruthi	Age 40 (2nd SIIMA)

== Winners ==
Year	Director	Film	Ref
2011	B. V. Nandini Reddy	Ala Modalaindi	
2012	Maruthi	Ee Rojullo	
2013	No Award		
2014	Sujeeth	Run Raja Run	
2015	Anil Ravipudi	Pataas	
2016	Tharun Bhascker	Pelli Choopulu	
2017	Sandeep Reddy Vanga	Arjun Reddy	
2018	Ajay Bhupathi	RX 100	
2019	Swaroop RSJ	Agent Sai Srinivasa Athreya	
2020	Karuna Kumar	Palasa 1978	
2021	Buchi Babu Sana	Uppena	
2022	Mallidi Vassishta	Bimbisara	
2023	Shouryuv	Hi Nanna	
2024	Nanda Kishore Emani	35 Chinna Katha Kaadu	
2025	Ram Jagadeesh	Court: State vs a Nobody	

== Nominations ==
- 2011: B. V. Nandini Reddy – Ala Modalaindi
  - Santosh Srinivas – Kandireega
  - Venu Sriram – Oh My Friend
  - Veerabhadram Chowdary – Aha Naa Pellanta
  - Ajay Bhuyan – Dhada
- 2012: Maruthi – Ee Rojullo
  - Tanikella Bharani – Mithunam
  - Balaji Mohan – Love Failure
  - Ohmkar – Genius
  - Kranthi Madhav – Onamalu
- 2014: Sujeeth – Run Raja Run
  - Sripriya – Drushyam
  - Chandoo Mondeti – Karthikeya
  - Bobby Kolli – Power
  - Srinivas Avasarala – Oohalu Gusagusalade
- 2015: Anil Ravipudi – Pataas
  - Karthik Gattamneni – Surya vs Surya
  - Radha Krishna Kumar – Jil
  - Nag Ashwin – Yevade Subramanyam
  - Sriram Adittya – Bhale Manchi Roju
- 2016: Tharun Bhascker – Pelli Choopulu
  - G. Naga Koteswara Rao – Nirmala Convent
  - K. V. Dayanand Reddy – Siddhartha
  - Kalyan Krishna – Soggade Chinni Nayana
  - Ravikanth Perepu – Kshanam
- 2017: Sandeep Reddy Vanga – Arjun Reddy
  - Mahi V Raghav – Anando Brahma
  - Prabhakar Podakandla – Next Nuvve
  - Sankalp Reddy – Ghazi
  - Vivek Athreya – Mental Madhilo
- 2018: Ajay Bhupathi – RX 100
  - Rahul Ravindran – Chi La Sow
  - Venky Atluri – Tholi Prema
  - Venky Kudumula – Chalo
  - Venu Udugula – Needi Naadi Oke Katha
- 2019: Swaroop RSJ – Agent Sai Srinivasa Athreya
  - Venkat Ramji – Evaru
  - Ritesh Rana – Mathu Vadalara
  - Raj R – Mallesham
  - Vishwak Sen – Falaknuma Das
- 2020: Karuna Kumar – Palasa 1978
  - Subbu – Solo Brathuke So Better
  - Sandeep Raj – Colour Photo
  - Sailesh Kolanu – HIT: The First Case
  - Ramana Teja – Aswathama
- 2021: Buchi Babu Sana – Uppena
  - Vijay Kanakamedala – Naandhi
  - Hasith Goli – Raja Raja Chora
  - Sridhar Gade – SR Kalyanamandapam
  - Praveen Kandregula – Cinema Bandi
- 2022: Mallidi Vassishta – Bimbisara
  - Sai Kiran – Masooda
  - Shree Karthick – Oke Oka Jeevitham
  - Vidya Sagar – Ashoka Vanamlo Arjuna Kalyanam
  - Vimal Krishna – DJ Tillu
- 2023: Shouryuv – Hi Nanna
  - Kalyan Shankar – Mad
  - Shanmukha Prasanth – Writer Padmabhushan
  - Srikanth Odela – Dasara
  - Sumanth Prabhas – Mem Famous
  - Venu Yeldandi – Balagam
- 2024: Nanda Kishore Emani – 35 Chinna Katha Kaadu
  - Anji K. Maniputhra – Aay
  - Sujith and Sandeep – KA
  - Vijay Binni – Naa Saami Ranga
  - Yadhu Vamsi – Committee Kurrollu
  - Yata Satyanarayana – Razakar
- 2025: Ram Jagadeesh – Court: State vs a Nobody
  - Jains Nani – K-Ramp
  - Neeraja Kona – Telusu Kada
  - Saailu Kampati – Raju Weds Rambai
  - Sai Marthand – Little Hearts
  - Praveena Paruchuri – Kothapallilo Okappudu
  - Praneeth Prattipati – Patang
