= Dhimahi =

- Release poster
- Directed by: Saahas Pagadala; Naveen Kante
- Produced by: Saahas Pagadala; Virat Kapur
- Starring: Saahas pagadala; Nikhita Chopra; Ashika Pagadal; Soujanya Kasina
- Cinematography: Rah Sharma
- Edited by: Santhosh Kamireddy
- Music by: Sharon Raavi
- Production company: Captain Cook Films
- Release date: 27 October 2023
- Country: India
- Language: Telugu

Dhimahi is a 2023 Indian Telugu-language supernatural thriller film written and directed by Saahas Pagadala and Naveen Kante. It is produced by Saahas Pagadala and Virat Kapur under the banner of Captain Cook Films and features Saahas Pagadala and Nikhita Chopra in lead roles. The film was released on 27 October 2023.

== Cast ==
- Saahas Pagadala As Kartik
- Nikhitha Sharma As Nidhi
- Ashika Pagadala As Dhimahi
- Soujanya Kasina As Mytri
- Virat Kapur As Vijay
- Jd Cherukuru As Jd
- Sreejith Gangadharan As Jaydev
- Vamsi Davuluri As Anand
- Ritu Chhina As Dhimahi
- Bhumika Patel As Bhumika
- Sushma Kapase

== Production ==
The trailer of the film was released on 18 October 2023, and the makers of the film announced that the film will be released on 27 October 2023.

== Reception ==
Suhas Sistu of The Hans India rated it 2.75 out of 5 stars and wrote that "Lead actor Saahas Pagadala gave a convincing performance in the purposeful role. His acting and facial expressions in close up shots is impressive". Bhavana Sharma of Deccan Chronicle stated that "Despite its shorter run-time, sharp writing, and strong performances, Dhimahi could have left a more significant impact in terms of direction. Nevertheless, the film is worth watching for its unique approach to an abstract theme using cinematic creativity."
