= CMantham =

Indian Telugu-language crime thriller film

Cmantham
- Theatrical release poster
- Directed by: Sudhakar Paani
- Produced by: Prasanth Tata
- Starring: Vajrayogi; Shreya Bharti
- Cinematography: Srinivas Vinnakota
- Edited by: Amar Reddy
- Music by: S. Suhas
- Production company: TR Dream Productions
- Release date: 14 November 2025
- Country: India

CMantham is a 2025 Indian Telugu-language crime thriller film directed by Sudhakar Paani and produced by Prasanth Tata. The film stars Vajra Yogi, Shreya Bharti and Anil Lingampally in the lead roles.

== Cast ==
- Vajra Yogi as Abhayanandhan
- Shreya Bharti as Abhignya
- Anil Lingampally as C.I.
- Praveen Dhacharam as Ramana
- Kakinada Nani as Head Constable

== Production ==
The film is directed by Sudhakar Paani and produced by Prasanth Tata under the banner of TR Dream Productions. The music is composed by S Suhas, with cinematography by Srinivas Vinnakota and edited by Amar Reddy.

== Reception ==
The Hans India critic stated that "Cmantham succeeds as an engaging crime thriller with its gripping storyline, strong performances, and well-crafted climax."

News18 wrote that "Overall, this Simantham crime thriller is a good experience for all sections of the audience."
