= Sangeerthana Vipin =

Indian actress (born 2002)

- Born: 6 November 2002 (age 22); Nileshwar, Kasaragod, Kerala, India
- Occupation: Actor
- Years active: 2023–present
- Parents: Vipin (father); Seema (mother)

Sangeerthana Vipin is an Indian actress.

== Early life and career ==
Sangeerthana Vipin was born in Nileshwar, Kasaragod, Kerala. She made her debut as a heroine in Malayalam cinema with the film Higuita, directed by Hemanth G Nair. In the same year, she appeared in the Telugu film Narakasura.

In 2024, her Tamil debut film Kaaduvetty, directed by Solai Arumugam, was released.That year, she also starred in two Telugu films.In Operation Raavan, directed by Venkata Satya, she portrayed an investigative journalist. She also appeared in Janaka Aithe Ganaka.

Her upcoming film, Asuragana Rudra is currently in production.

== Filmography ==
Year	Film	Roles	Language	Notes
2023	Higuita	Sharanya	Malayalam	
2023	Narakasura	Veeramani	Telugu	
2024	Kaaduvetty	Dakshayani	Tamil	
2024	Operation Raavan	Amani	Telugu	
2024	Janaka Aithe Ganaka	Haritha	Telugu	
TBA	Asuragana Rudra †	TBA	Telugu	
