= Honey (2026 film) =

2026 Indian Telugu film by Karuna Kumar

- Theatrical release poster
- Directed by: Karuna Kumar
- Written by: Karuna Kumar
- Produced by: Ravi Peetla
- Starring: Naveen Chandra; Divya Pillai; Divi Vadthya
- Cinematography: Nagesh Banell
- Edited by: Marthand K. Venkatesh
- Music by: Ajay Arasada
- Production company: Ova Entertainments
- Release date: 6 February 2026
- Country: India
- Language: Telugu

Honey is a 2026 Indian Telugu-language psychological horror thriller film written and directed by Karuna Kumar. It stars Naveen Chandra, Divya Pillai and Divi Vadthya.

The film was released on 6 February 2026.

== Plot ==
A fractured family descends into psychological and spiritual chaos when Anand, an unemployed man obsessed with occult rituals, pulls his wife Lalitha and young daughter Meera into dangerous tantric practices. As violence and paranoia escalate, Meera begins communicating with a mysterious entity called “Honey.” What unfolds is a disturbing blend of delusion and reality, revealing that the most terrifying horrors are not supernatural but human.

== Cast ==
- Naveen Chandra as Anand
- Divya Pillai as Lalitha, Anand's wife
- Divi Vadthya as Ravana
- Raja Ravindra as Sarangapani
- Jayanee as Meera, Anand's daughter

== Music ==
The background score and songs were composed by Ajay Arasada.

Track listing
No.	Title	Lyrics	Singer(s)	Length
1.	"Jo Jo Laali"	Ananthu Chinthalapalli	Pranidhi K	4:02
2.	"Telisi Rama"	Tyagaraja	Sahithi Chaganti	4:38

== Release and reception ==
Honey was released on 6 February 2026.

Suhas Sistu of The Hans India rated it 3/5 and wrote that, "Honey works as a meaningful psychological horror thriller that leaves a lasting impact". Sanjana Pulagurtha of The Times of India rated the film 2.5 out of 5 and stated, "the ideas remain compelling, but the execution doesn’t fully deliver the psychological payoff it aims for".

=== Streaming rights ===
The streaming rights of this movie were given by Amazon Prime Video and Sun NXT on 27 February 2026 and in Lionsgate Play on 20 March 2026.
