= Jagamerigina Satyam =

- Directed by: Tirupathi Pale
- Produced by: Acha Vijaya Basker
- Starring: Avinash Varma; Aadya Reddy; Neelima Pathakamsetti N R Vasudeva Rao; Nithin Bhogaraju
- Cinematography: Shoyab
- Edited by: Amar Reddy Kudumula
- Music by: Suresh Bobbili
- Production company: Amrutha Satyanarayana Creations
- Release date: 18 April 2025
- Country: India
- Language: Telugu

Jagamerigina Satyam is a 2025 Indian Telugu-language romantic thriller film directed by Tirupathi Pale. The film is produced by Acha Vijaya Basker under the banner of Amrutha Satyanarayana Creations. It features Avinash Verma, Aadya Reddy and Neelima Pathakamasetty the lead roles.

== Cast ==
- Avinash Varma
- Aadya Reddy
- Neelima Pathakamsetti N
- R Vasudeva Rao
- Nithin Bhogaraju

== Production ==
The film's music is composed by Suresh Bobbili, with cinematography by Shoyab and editing by Amar Reddy Kudumula.

== Reception ==
The Hans India critic stated that "This is not just a film to watch—it’s one to experience". News18 noted that "This is not a movie to be watched... a movie to be experienced. This is a story that combines emotion, culture, love, and sacrifice".
