= Rakshit Atluri =

Indian actor

- Born: 18 June; Vijayawada, Andhra Pradesh, India
- Occupation: Actor
- Years active: 2017–present

Rakshit Atluri is an Indian actor who works in Telugu cinema. Atluri debuted in London Babulu (2017) for which he received Santosham Best Debut Actor Award. In 2020, he starred in the action thriller film Palasa 1978 as Mohan Rao.

== Personal life and career ==
Rakshit was born and brought up in Vijayawada, Andhra Pradesh, India. He made his debut in the 2017 film London Babulu directed by Chinni Krishna. He was then selected to play the lead role in the 2020 film Palasa 1978, in which he played Mohan Rao in four distinct decades of life. He was first seen as an 18-year-old, then 24, 40 and finally as a 60-year-old. Within 45 days, he learnt to speak Telugu in a dialect that fit the Palasa region.

== Filmography ==
Year	Title	Role	Notes
2017	London Babulu	Gandhi	
2020	Palasa 1978	Mohan Rao	
2023	Narakasura	Shiva	
2024	Operation Raavan	Anand Sriram	Also lyricist and singer for "Poem"
2025	Sasivadane	Raghava	

== Awards and nominations ==
Year	Award	Category	Work	Result	Ref.
2018	Santosham Film Awards	Best Debut Actor	London Babulu	Won	
2022	Filmfare Awards South	Best Actor – Telugu	Palasa 1978	Nominated	
