= Kaaduvetty =

2024 Indian Tamil-language film written and directed by Solai Arumugam

- Directed by: Solai Arumugam
- Written by: Solai Arumugam
- Starring: R. K. Suresh; Sangeerthana Vipin
- Cinematography: M Pugazhenthi
- Edited by: John Abraham
- Music by: Songs: Vanakkam Tamizha Sadiq; Score: Srikanth Deva
- Production company: Manjal Screens
- Release date: 15 March 2024
- Running time: 131 minutes
- Country: India
- Language: Tamil

Kaaduvetty Nadunattukkathai also simply known as Kaaduvetty is 2024 Indian casteist Tamil-language romantic action drama film written and directed by Solai Arumugam in his directorial debut. The film was anticipated to be a fitting tribute in the form of a biopic and was loosely inspired based on the lifestory of politician and former head of Vanniyar Sangam caste Kaduvetti Guru.

The film had its theatrical release on 15 March 2024 coinciding with International Consumer Rights Day and the film opened to mostly negative reviews as the film had the attributes of a rural entertainer with the same usual outdated storyline incorporating the honor killing, caste culture and how women have been manipulated in the name of love.

== Synopsis ==
In a local rural remote village with little to no access to some essential facilities, corrupt politicians who engage in rampant corruption related activities would go further to next level by manipulating a bunch of uneducated youngsters in the village and they brainwash those young boys to exert control and stamp authority over schoolgirls. After witnessing hate crimes and toxic masculinity in the society, a local guy speaks up and rises against the agenda tactfully used by the politicians by exposing the politically motivated intentions of such politicians and he sheds light on the true reality of the politicians to the youngsters by explaining them with his own use of having exposed to such experience beforehand.

== Cast ==
- R. K. Suresh as Akilan
- Subramaniam Siva as Rajamanickam, Dakshayini's father
- Aadukalam Murugadoss as Akilan's father
- Sangeerthana Vipin as Dakshayini

== Censorship ==
It was revealed that the censor board had reportedly instructed the filmmakers to trim and cut at least 31 scenes which were captured in the whole film in its runtime. It was evident that the censor board was unhappy with the film portions due to lengthy detailed elements which consisted of sensitive elements according to their thought process and perspective.

The director of the film Solai Arumugam who was eventually marking his debut through this project faced further stumbling blocks and obstacles when the censor board requested to change the film title as the title Kaaduvetty apparently did not go well with the objective of the censor board. However, the director tried to convince the censor board by indicating the paramount importance in retaining the title as per his weight of expectations by narrating the sequence and buildup on why he is adamant to stick with the particular film title despite the opposition from the censor board. Solai Arumugam insisted that Kaaduvetty has a comprehensive analysis in the form of an history being embedded with it. Furthermore, he added that during ancient medieval times, kings would apparently pick a place of their choice in the forest for the purpose of conducting an intense war training. They would then ensure that trees are located in that particular location to be cut down to make vacant space and ventilation for the training ground in order to proceed with their intention. He also explained that the people used that place for their agricultural purposes which was a prominent part of their livelihoods. Hence the town was known as Kaaduvetty. Arumugam opined that there are at least 11 localities in Tamil Nadu similar to that and hence he tried to prove that Kaaduvetty title was well and truly relevant to the storyline since as per his say the writing was on the wall to have that name right from the word go when the principal photography went on floors.

== Release ==
The film's scheduled theatrical release was postponed on numerous occasions as it was expected to be released during the first week of Pongal in January 2023 coinciding with the Thai Pongal. The first look poster of the film was unveiled by the main lead actor of the R. K. Suresh in his official Twitter handle on 29 November 2020. The film was released theatrically on 15 March 2024. The film was streamed via Amazon Prime Video in June 2024.
