= Mallidi Vassishta =

Indian film director, screenwriter and actor (born 1986)

- Occupations: Film director; Screenwriter
- Years active: 2007–present

Mallidi Venkata Narayana Reddy, professionally known as Mallidi Vassishta, is an Indian film director, screenwriter and actor who works in Telugu cinema.

== Career ==
He initially worked as an assistant director for several films in the 2000s, including Naa Autograph (2004), Sakhiya (2004), Bunny (2005), Bhageeratha (2005), Dhee (2007), and Bodyguard (2012). He also acted in a film called Premalekha Raasa (2007) produced by his father, directed by Kulasekhar and co-starring Anjali. The film was a box office failure.

He made his directorial debut in 2022 with the fantasy action drama, Bimbisara starring Nandamuri Kalyan Ram under N. T. R. Arts and was released to positive reviews. He received the 2023 SIIMA Award for Best Debut Director - Telugu for this film.

His second directorial, Vishwambhara, starring Chiranjeevi as the protagonist is currently being filmed and is being bankrolled by UV Creations.

== Personal life ==
He is the son of film producer Mallidi Satyanarayana Reddy, who produced the blockbusters Bunny (2005) and Dhee (2007).

== Filmography ==
- All films are in Telugu, unless mentioned otherwise.

Key
†	Denotes films that have not yet been released

Year	Title	Notes
2022	Bimbisara	SIIMA Award for Best Debut Director – Telugu
2026	Vishwambhara †	

As actor

Year	Title	Role	Notes
2007	Premalekha Raasa	Seenu	credited as Venkat Mallidi
