= Anukunnadi Okati Ayinadi Okati =

2020 Indian film

Anukunnadi Okati Ayinadi Okkati
- Official release poster
- Directed by: Baalu Adusumilli
- Written by: Baalu Adusumilli
- Produced by: Rudrapati Ramana Rao
- Starring: Dhanya Balakrishna; Tridha Choudhury; Komalee Prasad; Siddhi Idnani
- Cinematography: Shekar Ganganamoni
- Edited by: Tellaguti Manikanth
- Music by: Vikas Badisha
- Production company: SLV Media
- Distributed by: Amazon Prime Video
- Release date: 6 March 2020
- Running time: 121 minutes
- Country: India
- Language: Telugu

Anukunnadi Okati Ayinadi Okkati (transl. Planned for one, happened the other) is a 2020 Indian Telugu-language black comedy film directed by debutant Baalu Adusumilli. The film stars Dhanya Balakrishna, Tridha Choudhury, Komalee Prasad and Siddhi Idnani. The story revolves around four modern girls who go to Goa for vacation where they hire a male stripper and confusion begins to lead to dramatic events. This film is an adaption of the 2017 American film Rough Night.

== Plot ==
Dhanya, a carefree girl who is a protective sister as well takes her three female friends to Goa searching for her sister. She sees a picture of her sister with a guy who has been synced on her phone. She starts investigating about her sister and finds out that the guy pictured with her sister is a prostitute. She learns that her sister's phone was stolen and she has misunderstood the situation. Things get worse and the guy is killed. The story follows the girls as they hilariously struggle to save themselves.

== Cast ==
- Dhanya Balakrishna as Dhanya, a Software engineer
- Tridha Choudhury as Tridha, a News reporter
- Komalee Prasad as Komalee, a Fashion Designer
- Siddhi Idnani as Siddhi, a Frustrated married wife
- Basha as Jack
- Sameer Hasan as Police Inspector
- Raghu Babu as News Channel Owner
- Raghu Karumanchi as Cult Kameshwar Rao, a film director
- Madhunandan as Shyam, husband of Siddhi
- Himaja as Srujana
- Kalyani
- Lobo
- JR Chaitu
- Sagar
- Bhanu Teja

== Soundtrack ==
Anukunnadi Okkati Ayyandhi Okati

Soundtrack album by Vikas Badisha
- Released: 22 February 2020
- Recorded: 2019
- Genre: Feature Film Soundtrack
- Length: 5:37
- Label: Mango Music
- Producer: Vikas Badisha

No.	Title	Lyrics	Singer(s)	Length
1.	"Kelli Veddam Lolli Chaddam"	Roll Rida	Roll Rida, Vishnupriya Ravi, Sameera Bharadwaj, Vikas Badisha	2:56
2.	"Bhago Re"	Shree Mani	Hemachandra	2:40

== Release and reception ==
The film was released in India on 6 March 2020. It was later released on Amazon Prime in April 2020.

The Times of India rated the film 1.5 stars out of 5 and wrote, "The film and its contrived storyline doesn’t give any of the actors enough scope to perform." NTV Telugu criticised the film for its poor storyline and lack of good humour. On performances, the reviewer stated that "Dhanya comes with a lot of ease, thanks to her familiarity with Telugu. Komalee Prasad, a Telugu-speaking actress, does a fine job as well. Tridha and Siddhi could have been much better."
