= Rolugunta Suri =

Indian Telugu-language action drama film

- Theatrical release poster
- Directed by: Anil Kumar Palla
- Written by: Anil Kumar Palla
- Screenplay by: Anil Kumar Palla; Aavula Venkatesh (additional)
- Story by: Anil Kumar Palla
- Produced by: Sowmya Chandini Palla
- Starring: Nagarjuna Palla; Aadhya Reddy; Brahmbananda Reddy; Satyanarayana
- Cinematography: Anil Kumar Palla
- Edited by: Aavula Venkatesh
- Music by: Subash Anand
- Production company: Tapasvi Art Creations.
- Release date: 14 November 2025
- Country: India
- Language: Telugu

Rolugunta Suri is a 2025 Indian Telugu-language action drama film written, directed, and filmed by Anil Kumar Palla. The film is produced by Sowmya Chandini Palla under the banner Tapasvi Art Creations. It stars Nagarjuna Palla, Aadhya Reddy, Brahmbananda Reddy, and Satyanarayana in major roles.

== Cast ==
- Nagarjuna Palla as Suri
- Aadhya Reddy as Kamala
- Brahmbananda Reddy
- Satyanarayana

== Production ==
The screenplay and story were written by Anil Kumar Palla, with Aavula Venkatesh contributing additional screenplay and handling the film's editing. Dialogues are written by Mohammed Sai. The music is composed by Subash Anand, while the background score (RR) is by Sandip Chakravarthy.

== Reception ==
News18 critic wrote that " This film with a strong message will give a good experience in the theater."and rated 2.75/5.

Thehansindia.com critic stated that " pactful moments. While not flawless, it stands out as a rare and meaningful addition to Telugu cinema." and rated three out of five stars.
