= W/O Anirvesh =

Indian Telugu-language drama film

- Poster
- Directed by: Ganga Sapthasikhara
- Written by: Ganga Sapthasikhara
- Produced by: Merugu Venkateshwarlu; Mahendra Gajendra
- Starring: Gemini Suresh; Jabardasth Ram Prasad; Sai Prasanna Kondra; Kireeti Damaraju
- Cinematography: Naidu VRK
- Edited by: Hemanth Nag
- Music by: Shanmukh Srinivas Pydi
- Production company: Gajendra Productions
- Distributed by: SKML Motion Pictures
- Release date: 7 March 2025
- Country: India
- Language: Telugu

W/O Anirvesh is a 2025 Indian Telugu-language drama film directed by Ganga Sapthasikhara. The film stars Gemini Suresh, Jabardasth Ram Prasad and Sai Prasanna Kondra in the lead roles, alongside Kireeti Damaraju and Kishore Reddy Chiliveri. The film was produced by Mahendra Gajendra and Merugu Venkateshwarlu under the banner of Gajendra Productions.

== Cast ==
- Gemini Suresh as Varadharajulu
- Jabardasth Ram Prasad as Anirvesh
- Sai Prasanna Kondra as Vichelitha
- Kireeti Damaraju
- Kishore Reddy Chiliveri
- Naziya Khan
- Saikiran Koneri
- Venkat Duggireddy

== Production ==
The film was directed by Ganga Sapthasikhara. Cinematography was by Naidu VRK, while editing was handled by Hemanth Nag. Shanmukh Srinivas Pydi composed the soundtrack of the film.

== Reception ==
Suhas Sistu of The Hans India stated that "If you’re a fan of crime mysteries, this film should be on your watchlist this weekend".
