= Palasa 1978 =

- Theatrical release poster
- Directed by: Karuna Kumar
- Written by: Karuna Kumar
- Produced by: Dhyan Atluri
- Starring: Rakshith; Nakshatra; Raghu Kunche
- Cinematography: Arul Vincent
- Edited by: Kotagiri Venkateswara Rao
- Music by: Raghu Kunche
- Production company: Sudhas Media
- Distributed by: Suresh Productions
- Release date: 6 March 2020
- Running time: 144 minutes
- Country: India
- Language: Telugu

Palasa 1978 is a 2020 Indian Telugu-language period action thriller film written and directed by Karuna Kumar in his directorial debut. The film stars Rakshith, Nakshatra, and Raghu Kunche who also composed the music. Prawin Yendamuri and Thiruveer play a supporting roles. The film is set in 1970s in Palasa, a town in Srikakulam district of Andhra Pradesh and revolves around the incidents related to caste discrimination and untouchability. The film was listed in the Film Companion's "Top 7 Telugu films of 2020" chart.

== Plot ==
The film starts with a man coming and beating another man, asking where is he? He tells that the man is in the Durga Mata festival. He goes and beheaded the man. Everyone is in shock. Then the police come immediately and try to catch the man. Then finally, one of the police officers catches up to him and asks why did he kill the man. The man tells his own story which exposes the caste discrimination in society.

== Cast ==
- Rakshith as Mohan Rao
- Nakshatra Trinayani as Lacchimi
- Raghu Kunche as Chinna Dora Guru Murthy ("Chinna Shavukar")
- Prawin Yendamuri as Tarakesh
- Janardhan as Pedda Dora Linga Murthy
- Vijay Ram as Sebastian
- Thiruveer as Rangarao
- Laxman Meesala as Dandaasi
- Kancharapalem Raju as Satya Narayana
- Jagadeesh Prathap Bandhari as Muthyalu
- Mirchi Madhavi as Sri Laxmi
- Thanmai Bolt as Gajula Gowri
- Shanmuk as Ganapavasu
- Sherin Santhosh as Jaggamma

== Production ==
=== Development ===
Karuna Kumar debuted as a director with the film. He admitted that the film is based on the incidents happened in his own hometown.

=== Cast and crew ===
As a maker of short-films, I used to work with a small crew. But when it comes to a feature film, there would be 80-100 people on set at any given time. Many wouldn't even be aware of who is the film's director. I have learned how to manage people on set. It's important, like directorial skills.

— Karuna Kumar, LetsOtt

Most of the actors in the film are debutants who previously worked in a few short films and web-series. Rakshith, who was last seen in London Babulu (2017), was signed to play the lead role after he consulted short film director Karuna Kumar. Rakshit's family friend, Tammareddy Bharadwaja, distributed the film. Rakshith learned the Palasa dialect of Telugu for the film. Thiruveer, who played the antagonist in George Reddy (2019), was signed to portray an antagonistic role.

Raghu Kunche composed the music who also played the character Guru Murthy in the film. He got wide recognition for both music composition and his acting. Arul Vincent in his Tollywood debut, handled the cinematography of the film. Award-winning editor Kotagiri Venkateswara Rao who worked for popular franchise Baahubali and film like Eega, Yamadonga, Magadheera, handled the editing production.

=== Filming ===
Principal shoot of the film began in late 2019. Majority of the film was shot at Palasa, Srikakulam and surrounding areas.

== Themes and influences ==
The films tells primarily about the caste discrimination in India and untouchability in the 1970s period. Yogesh Maitreya of Firstpost wrote that "Historically, Indian cinema exploited the labour of Dalits in its making, whilst erasing or appropriating their stories. This was not an accidental practice. When their stories were told on screen, it would be by savarnas who also played their characters with patriarchal, sexist and casteist undertones. The scenario has slowly changed, and the identity of Dalit characters in cinema — directed by a Dalit (and a few non-Dalit) filmmakers — has become explicit, transcending boundaries of caste and class. These filmmakers have helped shape visual storytelling that combines “justice with aesthetics”. “Justice with aesthetics” was rarely present in cinema made by savarnas, or it was seldom honest. Dalit-Bahujan filmmakers have filled this gap, while creating a new wave of cinema that is more appealing to a Dalit-Bahujan audience. In this film, we examine 10 Indian films that count not only among the finest cinema the country has produced, but are also intertwined with justice, politics, and aesthetic."

Another reviewer from The News Minute, Charan Teja, stated, "Telugu films are usually in the news for the buzz generated by their cast, crew and massive pre-release events. However, once in a while, films like Palasa 1978 garner attention due to their content and understanding of social history. The film, directed by Karuna Kumar, begins with bloodshed. After the title song, we hear the drum beats of a jatara (carnival), and the protagonist Mohan Rao (Rakshit), a Dalit man, beheads Ganapavasu, another Dalit man. The latter is a henchman of the Shavukarus, dominant caste Hindu landlords. While films on caste oppression have usually depicted Dalits as a homogeneous oppressed community, Palasa is a much more nuanced and historically authentic depiction of the violence that’s meted out in the name of caste."

== Music ==
Palasa 1978

Soundtrack album by Raghu Kunche
- Released: 2 March 2020 (Jukebox)
- Recorded: 2019–2020
- Studio: My Studio, Hyderabad
- Genre: Feature film soundtrack, Romance
- Length: 21:16
- Language: Telugu
- Label: Aditya Music
- Producer: Raghu Kunche

Raghu Kunche chronology
Raagala 24 Gantallo (2019)	Palasa 1978 (2020)
External audio
- Audio Jukebox on YouTube

Singles from Palasa 1978
- 1. "Bavochhadu" Released: 23 February 2020; 2. "Nakkileesu Golusu" Released: 21 March 2020

The music is composed by Raghu Kunche.

Original Motion Picture Soundtrack
No.	Title	Lyrics	Singer(s)	Length
1.	"Nakkileesu Golusu"	Uttarandhra Janapadam	Raghu Kunche	3:56
2.	"Baavochhadu"	Uttarandhra Janapadam	Aditi Bhavaraju	3:15
3.	"Ye Ooru Ye Oore"	Bhaskarabhatla Ravi Kumar	Vaikom Vijayalakshmi, Raju Jamuku Asirayya	3:10
4.	"O Sogasari"	Lakshmi Bhupala	S. P. Balasubrahmanyam, Baby Pasala	5:14
5.	"Kalavathi Kalavathi"	Suddala Ashok Teja	Ramya Behara, Raghu Kunche	4:25
6.	"Chinthachettukinda"	Karuna Kumar	Sandhya Koyyada	1:16
Total length:				21:16

Neeshita Nyayapati of The Times of India on reviewing the music, wrote that "The album of Palasa 1978 is easily one of the best albums of the year. Raghu Kunche truly does an outstanding job of staying true to the time, era and story that the film aims to explore. However, this album is not for anyone looking for the same ol’ Tollywood fare but it's definitely for you if you're looking to expand your horizons. You won't regret listening to it even if this kind of music may not be your first choice." Another reviewer from IndiaGlitz stated "A largely middling album with three worthy songs. The genres of the songs are in tune with the backdrop of the movie."

== Reception ==
The Times of India gave the film four out of five stars and wrote that "Highlighting the casteist nature of the state and mainstream politics, Palasa has a reference to many atrocities committed on Dalits across the country". In a review of the film by The Hindu, the reviewer wrote that "Director Karuna Kumar's film is a gritty story of folk artistes picking up guns for survival". A review in Sakshi appreciated director Karuna Kumar's attempt in picking up a sensitive subject like caste and opined that he succeeded in making the film appealing to all types of audiences.

Sankeertan Varma of Film Companion stated, "At a crucial and effecting moment in the film, Sebastian invokes Ambedkar as an example to suggest that violence isn’t the only way to deal with an unfair society. Elsewhere, we see Mohan Rao reading Kalyan’s Rao’s Antarani Vasantamwhile trying to understand his life and its purpose. This is a film that isn’t interested in being anything but informed and responsible. Telugu cinema, even it has been talking about caste oppression in the recent past, has largely been averse to stories that are explicitly political. So, to see a film that talks about caste-based oppression and its many complexities organically, without hiding behind happy endings and generic philosophies is refreshing to watch, warts and all."

Jeevi of Idlebrain.com wrote that "Palasa 1978 is a realistic film that deals with the caste divide in the 80's in the backward region of Uttarandhra. The debutant director Karuna Kumar has tried to narrate it with utmost genuinity by adding some commercial touch. Plus points are realistic backdrop, characterizations, dialogues, dialect and the subject. On the flipside, the screenplay of the film is not good. Narration should have been more interesting towards the latter part of the film. Despite a few shortcomings, Palasa 1978 stands out as a genuine attempt by the director Karuna Kumar."

== Accolades ==
Award (Note: Awards, festivals and organizations are in alphabetical order.)	Date of ceremony (Note: Date is linked to the article about the awards held that year, wherever possible.)	Category	Recipient(s)	Result	Ref.
Filmfare Awards South	9 October 2022	Best Film – Telugu	Dhyan Atluri	Nominated	
Filmfare Awards South	9 October 2022	Best Director – Telugu	Karuna Kumar	Nominated	
Filmfare Awards South	9 October 2022	Best Actor – Telugu	Rakshit Atluri	Nominated	
Filmfare Awards South	9 October 2022	Best Supporting Actor – Telugu	Thiruveer	Nominated	
Filmfare Awards South	9 October 2022	Best Playback Singer – Female	Aditi Bhavaraju – (for "Baavochhadu")	Nominated	
