= Mutton Soup =

- Theatrical release poster
- Directed by: Ramachandra Vattikuti
- Written by: Ramachandra Vattikuti
- Produced by: Mallikarjuna Elika; Sanapala Ramakrishna; Arun Chandra Vattikuti
- Starring: Raman Reddy Korivi; Varsha Vishwanath; Gemini Suresh; Sanapala Ramakrishna; Govindraj Neerudi; Kiran Medasani; Mallikarjuna Elika; Sunitha Manohar
- Cinematography: Lokesh Kumar Kadali
- Edited by: Lokesh Kumar Kadali
- Music by: Venky Veena
- Production company: Independent Production
- Release date: 10 October 2025 (India)
- Running time: 132 minutes
- Country: India
- Language: Telugu

Mutton Soup is a 2025 Indian Telugu-language crime thriller film written and directed by Ramachandra Vattikuti. The film stars Raman Reddy Korivi and Varsha Vishwanath in the lead roles, with Gemini Suresh, Sanapala Ramakrishna, and Mallikarjuna Elika appearing in supporting roles. Produced by Mallikarjuna Elika, Sanapala Ramakrishna, and Arun Chandra Vattikuti, the film features music composed by Venky Veena. It was released theatrically on 10 October 2025.

== Plot ==
Mutton Soup follows the story of a married couple whose peaceful life takes a dark turn after an unexpected tragedy. As the story progresses, their personal struggles unfold into a complex web of crime and deception, blurring the line between guilt and redemption. Set in Hyderabad's shadowy streets, the film explores how a single act can spiral into chaos, leading to devastating consequences.

== Cast ==
- Raman Reddy Korivi as Sriram
- Varsha Vishwanath as Satya
- Gemini Suresh as Shivaram
- Sanapala Ramakrishna as Gopal
- Govindraj Neerudi as Govind
- Kiran Medasani as Rajkumar
- Mallikarjuna Elika as Narayana
- Sunitha Manohar

== Production ==
The film's title poster was unveiled by veteran producer K. S. Rama Rao in early 2025, officially introducing Mutton Soup as a raw and realistic crime thriller inspired by true incidents. The trailer launch event was graced by filmmaker Vassishta, who wished the team success ahead of the release. Principal photography took place in Hyderabad, with cinematographer Lokesh Kumar Kadali focusing on gritty visual realism to capture the city's underbelly.

== Music ==
The film's score and soundtrack were composed by Venky Veena.

- "Hara Hara Shankara"

== Release and reception ==
Mutton Soup was released in Indian theatres on 10 October 2025.

A critic from OTTplay rated the film 2.5/5 stars and wrote, "On the whole, Mutton Soup has an interesting premise, but the lack of noted actors takes things down in key areas. But there are a few thrills that have been narrated well and end the film on a passable note".

The Hans India rated the movie 3/5 stars.
