= Sridevi Soda Center =

2021 film by Karuna Kumar

Sridevi Soda Centre
- Theatrical release poster
- Directed by: Karuna Kumar
- Screenplay by: Karuna Kumar
- Story by: Nagendra Kasi
- Produced by: Vijay Chilla; Shashi Devireddy
- Starring: Sudheer Babu; Anandhi
- Cinematography: Shamdat Sainudeen
- Edited by: A. Sreekar Prasad
- Music by: Mani Sharma
- Production company: 70mm Entertainments
- Distributed by: Bridge Films; Zee Studios
- Release date: 27 August 2021
- Running time: 154 minutes
- Country: India
- Language: Telugu

Sridevi Soda Centre is a 2021 Indian Telugu-language romantic action drama film written by Nagendra Kasi and directed by Karuna Kumar and produced by Vijay Chilla and Shashi Devireddy under the banner of 70mm Entertainments. The film stars Sudheer Babu and Anandhi while Pavel Navageethan (in his Telugu debut), Naresh, and Satyam Rajesh play supporting roles. The film was released theatrically on 27 August 2021.

== Synopsis ==
Suri Babu is an expert in lighting arrangements in his village and aspires to start a shop with the same business. He falls in love with Sridevi, whose family business is a soda center run by her father Sanjeev Rao. Sridevi reciprocates Suri Babu's love, but her father disagrees as Suri Babu does not belong to his caste. Suri Babu gets tangled in a murder case, while Kasi, a big shot in the village, becomes another big trouble for him. Whether Suri Babu overcomes the struggle to win his love forms the story.

== Cast ==
- Sudheer Babu as "Lighting" Soori Babu
- Anandhi as "Sodaala" Sridevi
- Pavel Navageethan as Kasi
- Naresh as Sanjeev Rao, Sridevi's father
- Satyam Rajesh as Karri Durga Rao, Soori Babu's friend
- Raghu Babu as Narsayya, Soori Babu's father
- Kalyanee Raju as Dhanalakshmi, Sridevi's mother
- Ajay as Kodi Katthi Seenu
- Praveen as Chitturi Siva
- Harsha Vardhan as Prasad
- Rohini as Padma
- Saptagiri as Revu Nagaraju
- Sneha Gupta in an item number in the song "Mandhuloda".

== Soundtrack ==
No.	Title	Singer(s)	Length
1.	"Naalone Unna"	Anurag Kulkarni	3:20
2.	"Mandhuloda"	Sahithi Chaganti, Dhanunjay	4:04
3.	"Naalo Innalluga"	Ramya Behara, Dinker Kalvala	4:17
4.	"Chukkala Melam"	Anurag Kulkarni	4:56
5.	"Love Theme"		2:17

== Reception ==
Thadhagath Pathi of The Times of India rated the film 3/5 and he termed it "a powerful story with a gut-wrenching ending". Sangeetha Devi Dundoo of The Hindu in a more mixed review opined that overdoing the mainstream indulgences pulled the film down. "Sridevi Soda Center is the kind of film that happens when art-house and mainstream meet midway but it is not seamless. There are a few memorable moments and hard-hitting segments, but the film doesn’t sweep you off your feet," she added.

A reviewer from Deccan Chronicle rated the film 2.5 stars of 5 and called it "partly engaging." While appreciating the performances of Babu of Anandhi individually, they wrote that the love and chemistry between them was weak. Bhuvanesh Chandar of Cinema Express criticized the film for its "predictable, hardly engaging screenplay." Chandar was disappointed because the film showed "a lot of promise and scope" that went underutilised.
