= Run Raja Run =

2014 film directed by Sujeeth

- Film poster
- Directed by: Sujeeth
- Written by: Sujeeth
- Produced by: V. Vamsi Krishna Reddy; Pramod Uppalapati
- Starring: Sharwanand; Seerat Kapoor; Adivi Sesh
- Cinematography: R. Madhi
- Edited by: Madhu
- Music by: Ghibran
- Production company: UV Creations
- Release date: 1 August 2014
- Running time: 137 minutes
- Country: India
- Language: Telugu
- Box office: ₹12 crore distributors' share

Run Raja Run is a 2014 Indian Telugu-language romantic comedy thriller film directed by debutant Sujeeth and produced by Uppalapati Pramod and V. Vamsi Krishna Reddy on UV Creations banner. The film stars Sharwanand, Seerat Kapoor and Adivi Sesh, while Sampath Raj and Jayaprakash play supporting roles. The film was released worldwide on 1 August 2014 to positive reviews from critics and became a box office blockbuster success. The film was also dubbed and released in Tamil under the same title. It also fetched the state Telangana Gaddar Film Award for Best Feature Film.

== Plot ==
Raja Harishchandra Prasad is the son of a vegetable vendor named Prakash. He constantly keeps breaking up with girls because of his extreme honesty. He meets Priya, and they both fall in love. Meanwhile, there are kidnappings of ministers in the city, and the person who solved the mystery years ago, commissioner Dileep Kumar, has an officer under him, Nayeem Basha, who is intelligent but unappreciated. Raja learns that Priya is Dileep's daughter and that she is about to marry Mukundham, the son of Minister Govindharaju.

Raja talks with Dileep, who reveals he wants to get Priya married to Mukundham and tricks Raja into kidnapping one of the city's big shots. However, Raja instead kidnaps Priya, who tells him that she never loved him and only pretended so that she could go for higher studies in US. Though heartbroken, Raja takes her to her friend's house. Dileep tries to find her but is unsuccessful. Priya eventually starts falling for Raja, who calls Dileep and demands 3 crore rupees as ransom. After comparing Priya's and other kidnappings, Nayeem finds out that the kidnapper is Raja and informs Dileep and that he tricked Dileep. Priya learns about the ransom. When she questions him, her father arrives and arrests Raja. Dileep is happy that the kidnapper is caught, but Mukundham is later kidnapped. A ransom of 15 crore rupees is demanded. When Dileep goes to the police station, Raja is not there.

Priya learns from her mother that Prakash and her father Dileep were good friends in the past, and that Prakash considered Karim, a sincere cop, as his own family. Prakash finds that the kidnappings were planned by Govindaraju and heads to arrest him, but Dileep reveals that it was all his plan. Govindaraju kills Karim. Enraged, Prakash shoots Govindaraju (the bullet hits his throat and remains there) and is framed for the kidnapping and imprisoned. Meanwhile, Dileep learns that Nayeem and Raja were in cahoots. Nayeem takes the 15 crore rupees from Govindaraju. Prakash reveals to Dileep that Nayeem is actually Karim's son. Raja then sends a video to the media in which Dileep has admitted to being the real kidnapper. Nayeem takes the 500 crore rupees from Govindaraju's house and donates it to the orphanage. Dileep is finally arrested as Govindaraju dies of his gunshot wound. Finally, Priya and Raja reunite in peace.

== Cast ==
- Sharwanand as Raja Harishchandra Prasad
- Seerat Kapoor as Priya
- Adivi Sesh as Nayeem Basha
- Sampath Raj as Police Commissioner Dileep Kumar
- Jayaprakash as Prakash, Ex Police Commissioner
- Kota Srinivasa Rao as Minister Govindharaju
- Vennela Kishore as Mukundham, Raju's son
- Ali as Dr. Subramaniam, FRCS
- Vidyullekha Raman as Maggie a.k.a. Bujjima
- Ajay Ghosh as Munuswamy, Raju's assistant
- Dhanya Balakrishna as Soundarya / Bangaram
- Chatrapathi Sekhar as Md. Khalid Basha
- Shakalaka Shankar as Police Officer
- Chammak Chandra as fake Bujji
- Ananth as Store worker
- Prabhas Sreenu as Govindharaju's henchman
- Kotesh Manava as Police Inspector
- RK Mama as CI Vasudev Sharma
- Sudharshan as Bus conductor
- Kalpa Latha
- Josh Ravi as Priya's friend
- Sujeeth as himself (cameo appearance in the song "Vasthava Vasthava")

== Production ==
Sharwanand was approached by short film maker Sujeeth to play the male protagonist in the film and the former accepted the offer after expressing few doubts. He was forced by the makers to change his look for the film and for giving him a new look, Bhaskar designed the costumes and hair stylist Hakim Aalim was selected for the hair styling and basic look. He did not take any remuneration for the film as the producers were his friends. Seerat Kapoor was selected after conducting a photo shoot followed by a screen test after she gave her audition at Hyderabad which marked her debut in Telugu cinema. Uppalapati Pramod and Vamsi Krishna announced this film with Adivi Sesh in an important role apart from the protagonists in mid December 2013.

Further details about the project were unveiled on 10 February 2014 and the film was titled Run Raja Run after one of the short films directed by Sujeeth and the producers confirmed that the film is a bilingual. R. Madhi was declared as the cinematographer and M. Ghibran was selected as the music director marking his Telugu debut. On 10 February 2014 the press release confirmed that Adivi Sesh, Sampath Raj, Jayaprakash, Vennela Kishore, Ali, Kota Srinivasa Rao, Vidyullekha Raman and Ajay Ghosh are part of the principal cast. By mid-February 2014, about 50% of the film's shoot was complete and the shooting was undergoing at Ramoji Film City in Hyderabad before shifting to Goa for a month-long schedule.

== Reception ==
The film received positive reviews from critics. Deccan Chronicle wrote "Director Sujeeth's story is not unique, but his screenplay makes it interesting. A pat to the young director's back for coming up with a breezy entertainer. There are a few minus points too as the beginning of the film is a bit boring. The film, however, slowly picks up." Sify gave a review stating "Overall Run Raja Run is a fun caper, with an impressive second half. For Sharwanand this film is a perfect comeback. The pluses in this film are the lead hero's performance and the twists and turns. Run Raja Run promises good entertainment this monsoon."

On the other hand, The Hindu wrote "What seem to be attempts at humour just end up being crass and forced. However, things do pick up towards the climax and all the pointless sequences seem to fall into place. It is with this twist that the film finally becomes interesting." The Times of India wrote "Sujeeth gets a lot of things right in his debut film; however, it still is a lost opportunity. The emphasis on style takes over the sharp writing that's quite visible in the first act. For all you know, Run Raja Run could have been a truly unique and quirky film in a long time. Alas, it ends up as a light-hearted entertainer which begins to take itself too seriously after a point and loses its edginess in the process" and rated the film 3/5.

== Soundtrack ==
Ghibran composed the music and background score for this film which marked his debut in Telugu. He was approached by Sujeeth, Uppalapati Pramod and R. Madhi to compose the film's music at Chennai when Pramod was impressed with his work in Naiyaandi (2013) and Sujeeth was impressed with his work in Vaagai Sooda Vaa (2011). Ghibran, who wanted to do a Telugu film then, accepted their proposal. The soundtrack featured five songs with lyrics written by Sri Mani and Ramajogayya Sastry and distributed and released by Junglee Music on 15 June 2014 at a promotional event at GRIET in Hyderabad. The film's soundtrack received positive reviews from critics.

== Awards ==
South Indian International Movie Awards – winner
- Best Debut Director (Telugu) – Sujeeth

Filmfare Awards South – nominations
- Best Film
- Best Director – Sujeeth
- Best Actor – Sharwanand
- Best Music Director – Ghibran

Nandi Awards
- Best Female Comedian - Vidyullekha Raman

Telangana Gaddar Film Awards
- First Best Feature Film
