= Operation Raavan =

2024 Indian film by Venkata Satya

- Theatrical release poster
- Directed by: Venkata Satya
- Written by: Venkata Satya; Lakshmi Lohith Pujari
- Produced by: Dhyan Atluri
- Starring: Rakshit Atluri; Sangeerthana Vipin
- Cinematography: Nani Chamidisetty
- Edited by: Satya Giduturi
- Music by: Saravana Vasudevan
- Production company: Sudhas Media
- Release date: 26 July 2024
- Country: India
- Language: Telugu

Operation Raavan is a 2024 Indian Telugu-language crime thriller film written and directed by Venkata Satya. The film features Rakshit Atluri and Sangeerthana Vipin in lead roles. Operation Raavan was released on 26 July 2024.

== Plot ==
The story revolves around a young journalist Anand Sriram, who works at TV45 under Aamani, a senior journalist. While Aamani is struggling to expose the corruption of a minister, they encounter mysterious murders of brides-to-be. As police fails to solve the case, Anand and Aamani unofficially start investigating on their own, discovering clues and finding Jeevitha at the heart of the mystery.

== Cast ==
- Rakshit Atluri as Anand Sriram
- Sangeerthana Vipin as Aamani
- Raghu Kunche as a minister
- Radhika Sarathkumar as Jeevitha
- Charan Raj
- Vinod Sagar
- S. S. Kanchi
- Rocket Raghava
- Murthy Devagupthapu

== Music ==
Operation Raavan

Soundtrack album by Saravana Vasudevan
- Released: 2024
- Recorded: 2023–2024
- Language: Telugu
- Label: Aditya Music
- Producer: Saravana Vasudevan

The film's soundtrack album and background score were composed by Saravana Vasudevan.

All music is composed by Saravana Vasudevan.

Track list
No.	Title	Lyrics	Singer(s)	Length
1.	"Chandamaama Kathalonaa"	Purnachary	Haricharan, Geetha Madhuri
2.	"Nithyam Kolichemu Swaami"	Pranavam	Sandilya Pisapati
3.	"Gamaname Thappe Gathulane"	Pranavam	Darbha Sisters, N. C. Karunya
4.	"Allukunna Ee Bandhame"	Pranavam	Sandilya Pisapati
5.	"Raavana Thaandavam (Theme Music)"	Traditional	Aditya Bheemathati
6.	"Poem"	Karuna Sri	N. C. Karunya

== Release and reception ==
Operation Raavan was released on 26 July 2024.

Sashidhar Adivi of Times Now gave a rating of 2 out of 5 opining that the film is "a listless thriller" with nothing new to offer. Giving the same rating, Avad Mohammad of OTTPlay cited the film to be "bland and boring". BH Harsh of The New Indian Express gave a rating of 1.5 out of 5 saying, "Operation Raavan, in its entirety, remains a tiring and dull whodunit".
