= Anaganaga Australia Lo =

Indian Telugu-language suspense thriller film

- Poster
- Directed by: Taraka Rama
- Written by: Taraka Rama
- Produced by: B.T.R Srinivsarao; Madhavi Mangapati; Yarik Studios
- Starring: Jyothinath Goud; Saanya Bhatnagar; Chandra Kommalapat
- Cinematography: Arun Dondapati
- Edited by: Taraka Rama
- Music by: U.V Niranjan
- Production company: Sahaana Art Creations
- Release date: 21 March 2025
- Country: India
- Language: Telugu

Anaganaga Australia Lo (transl. Once upon in Australia) is a 2025 Indian Telugu-language suspense thriller film directed by Taraka Rama. The film is produced by B.T.R Srinivsarao, Madhavi Mangapati, and Yarik Studios under the banner of Sahaana Art Creations. It features Jyothinath and Saanya Bhatnagarin the lead roles.<

== Cast ==
- Jyothinath Goud
- Agraja Lakshmi
- Saanya Bhatnagar
- Chandra Kommalapat
- JDR Cherukuru
- Prabha Agraja
- Sundeep Bellumkenda
- Mani Deepak Kadimisetty

== Production ==
The film's music is composed by U.V Niranjan, with cinematography by Arun Dondapati and editing by Taraka Rama.Entire film was shot in Australia

== Reception ==
Ramu Chinthakindhi of Times Now stated that "The movie 'Anaganaga Australialo' will definitely appeal to those who like crime thrillers."HMTV critic wrote that "It is an interesting script that combines comedy, thrill, and romance. If you want to enjoy some entertainment along with thrilling elements, this movie is a good option."
