= Higuita (film) =

- Directed by: Hemanth G Nair
- Written by: Hemanth G Nair
- Produced by: Bobby Tharian & Sajith Amma
- Starring: Suraj Venjaramoodu; Dhyan Sreenivasan
- Cinematography: Fazil Nazer
- Edited by: Praseedh Narayanan
- Music by: Songs: Rahul Raj; Background Score: Dawn Vincent
- Production company: 2nd Half Productions
- Distributed by: Dream Big Films
- Release date: 31 March 2023
- Country: India
- Language: Malayalam

Higuita is a 2023 Indian Malayalam-language political drama film directed by Hemanth G. Nair and produced by Bobby Tharian and Sajith Amma. The film stars Suraj Venjaramoodu in the titular role, supported by an ensemble cast including Dhyan Sreenivasan, Manoj K. Jayan, Indrans, Abu Salim, and Vineeth Kumar. Set against the volatile political landscape of Kannur, Kerala, the film explores the turbulent relationship between a left-wing leader and his conflicted bodyguard amidst a web of betrayal and power struggles.

The film's title, Higuita, drew controversy when writer N. S. Madhavan claimed it infringed on his rights to a story of the same name. Despite the dispute, the film was released on 31 March 2023 to a mixed critical reception. While some praised its thought-provoking dialogues and exploration of political opportunism, others criticized its reliance on stereotypes and uneven execution.

== Plot ==
Pannyannoor Mukundhan, a fiery leader of the Revolutionary Party of India (RPI), faces constant threats due to his dominance in Malabar's left-wing politics. Ayyapa Das, a timid young man, reluctantly joins the police force as a gunman to avert his family's financial crisis following his father's death who was a head constable. Leveraging local political connections, Das secures a posting as Mukundhan's personal bodyguard, despite his aversion to Kannur's violent reputation.

The film opens with the murder of Vinod, an activist from the rival far right wing Kerala Janata Party (KJP) , allegedly by Communist party workers after he blocked Mukundhan's vehicle during a protest. Soon after, Das is assigned to protect Mukundhan, who is implicated in Vinod's murder case. During a court hearing for the case, masked assailants hurl a bomb and stab Mukundhan, leaving him critically injured. Though Das is initially blamed for lax security, Mukundhan vouches for his competence, shielding him from disciplinary action.

As Mukundhan recuperates, Das grows suspicious of anonymous threats and unseen stalkers. At an RPI meeting, he recognizes Raghu—Mukundhan's former aide—among the attendees, secretly photographing him. Investigating further, Das learns Raghu now conspires with Gopinathan, a senior party figure, to eliminate Mukundhan, fearing his rising influence. Gopinathan subtly pressures Das to resign, but Mukundhan dismisses Das's warnings about the conspiracy.

Das is abducted by Vishnu, a KJP henchman involved in Vinod's murder, and taken to KJP leaders. They reveal Vinod's killing was a personal vendetta (for an illicit affair with another person's wife) disguised as political rivalry, exposing Kannur's culture of leveraging politics for private vengeance. The KJP coerces Das into luring Mukundhan to a secluded Theyyam ritual for assassination.

On the night of the ritual, Das feigns compliance but turns on the KJP attackers, engaging them in a violent clash until police arrive. The conspirators are arrested, and Mukundhan, impressed by Das's loyalty, offers him the choice to stay or leave. Shortly after, Mukundhan is promoted to RPI secretary, appointing Raghu—his alleged would-be assassin—as his aide.

Das recalls Mukundhan's analogy comparing himself to Colombian goalkeeper René Higuita, who both defended and scored goals. Realizing Mukundhan orchestrated the attack to cement his power, Das understands the leader's manipulation of crises for political gain. Disillusioned, Das returns home, hardened by his experiences but resolute in rejecting the cycle of violence.

== Cast ==
- Suraj Venjaramoodu as Sakhavu Panniyannur Mukundan
- Dhyan Sreenivasan as Ayyappadas, a policeman, Mukundan's gunman
- Manoj K. Jayan as M.V. Gopinathan
- Indrans as Kunjananthan master
- Binu Pappu as Raghu
- Vineeth Kumar as Choonda Ramesh
- Sanju Sivram as Vinod
- Nirmal Palazhi as Brannan Suresh
- Navas Vallikunnu as Sheriff
- Nisthar Sait as Sakhavu Kainakari Balan
- Jayaprakash Kuloor as Kannavam Narayanadas
- Sangeerthana Vipin as Sharanya
- Abu Salim as DYSP Premachandran
- Ayyappa Baiju as Peter
- Sruthy Jayan as Auto driver Jayalakshmi

== Music ==
Rahul Raj was initially signed in 2020 to compose the film's score and songs. However, after the film's production was delayed until 2022, Raj composed the songs but opted out of creating the background score due to scheduling conflicts. Dawn Vincent was subsequently brought in to compose the film's background score.

== Reception ==
The film received mixed reviews from critics. S.R. Praveen of The Hindu criticized the film, stating that it was a "political drama wallowing in stereotypes and half-truths." In contrast, Princy of Onmanorama praised the film, noting that "the dialogues are thought-provoking, impactful, and take a dig at political opportunism." Anjana George of The Times of India awarded the film 3 out of 5 stars, commenting, "The film has several moments that give goosebumps to 'communist' buffs. But it also tries hard to create icons that are being celebrated as 'men with two hearts.' It is a movie 'for the communist.'" Cris of The News Minute was less impressed, giving the film 2 out of 5 stars and writing, "Regardless of the stand the film wants to take, the making leaves a lot to be desired. Scenes cut into each other poorly, and characters seem written half-heartedly."
