= Matka (film) =

2024 Indian action film by Karuna Kumar

- Theatrical release poster
- Directed by: Karuna Kumar
- Written by: Karuna Kumar
- Based on: The life of Ratan Khetri
- Produced by: Vijender Reddy Teegala; Rajani Talluri
- Starring: Varun Tej; Meenakshi Chaudhary; Nora Fatehi
- Cinematography: A. Kishor Kumar
- Edited by: Karthika Srinivas
- Music by: G. V. Prakash Kumar; Bhavani Rakesh (1 song)
- Production companies: Vyra Entertainments; SRT Entertainments
- Release date: 14 November 2024
- Running time: 159 minutes
- Country: India
- Language: Telugu

Matka is a 2024 Indian Telugu-language period action thriller film written and directed by Karuna Kumar. It was produced by Vijender Reddy Teegala and Rajani Talluri, under Vyra Entertainments and SRT Entertainments, respectively. It stars Varun Tej, Meenakshi Chaudhary, and Nora Fatehi (in her Telugu cinema debut) in the lead roles. It is based on the life of the Matka gambler Ratan Khetri.

Matka was released on 14 November 2024. The film was heavily panned by critics for the narration, direction, excessive runtime, dull screenplay and underperformed at the box office.

== Plot ==
The story takes place between 1934 and 1988 in Visakhapatnam, based on real life incidents. It follows the life of Vasu, a young man who is lured into the Matka gambling business and gets entangled in the complex world of crime, deceit, and betrayal. Vasu later becomes a gangster but unfortunately gets betrayed by his close aides. How he regains his lost position and takes down his enemies forms the story.

== Cast ==
- Varun Tej as 'Matka' Vasu
  - Karthikeya Dev as young Vasu
- Meenakshi Chaudhary as Sujatha, Vasu's love interest turned wife
- Nora Fatehi as Sofia
- Naveen Chandra as Sahu
- Saloni Aswani as Padma
- Jisshu Sengupta as Ajmal Zanzibari Rashid Khhan
- P. Ravi Shankar as Narayana Murthy
- Ajay Ghosh as Chilla Appala Reddy
- Kishore as Nani Babu
- John Vijay as KB
- Satyam Rajesh as Prasad
- Pankaj Kesari as Polynesian Raghava
- Riyaz Khan as Sachin Farhan Jones
- Rupa Lakshmi as Saradha
- Avinash Kanaparthi as Chitti Babu
- Rayala Harischandra as Anjayya Factory Security Guard
- Vijaya Rama Raju as Ammoru
- Vijay Binni as Kobbari Tota Gang
- Ramya Ramakrishnan as Mitra
- Sanjay Krishna as Allipuram Shankar
- Sky as Solomon
- Teja Kakumanu as SI Konda
- Ravikumar as Pandiyan
- Manoj Muthyam as Raju

== Production ==
=== Filming ===
Varun Tej's 14th film, initially referred to “VT14”, later officially titled as Matka. On 27 July 2023, the muhurat shot for Matka was held in Hyderabad. The event was attended by notable film industry figures, including Allu Aravind, Dil Raju, Harish Shankar, and Maruthi. On 14 December 2023 the makers has announced that they have commenced Principal photography.

On 23 August 2024, the filmmakers announced that an extensive action sequence featuring Varun Tej was being filmed in Kakinada. The final schedule of the movie is currently underway, with key sequences being shot at Ramoji Film City in Hyderabad. This schedule will mark the completion of the film's entire shooting.

=== Marketing ===
On January 19, 2024, the makers has shared a 'Matka - Opening Bracket' glimpse from the film in celebration of Varun Tej's birthday, followed by the release of the first look on 11 August 2024, showcasing Varun Tej.

The teaser of Matka released on 5 October 2024 at Raj Yuvraj (G3) Theatre, Vijayawada. According to The Times of India, the film had only grossed 2.11 crore INR on its opening weekend.

== Soundtrack ==
The soundtrack and background score were composed by G. V. Prakash Kumar, with a song being composed by Bhavani Rakesh. Aditya Music acquired the audio rights. The first single titled "Le Le Raja " was released on 14 October 2024. The second single titled "Thassadiyya" was released on 24 October 2024.

No.	Title	Lyrics	Music	Singer(s)	Length
1.	"Le Le Raja"	Bhaskarabhatla	G. V. Prakash Kumar	Neeti Mohan	4:06
2.	"Thassadiyya"	Bhaskarabhatla	G. V. Prakash Kumar	Mano	3:27
3.	"Rama Talkies Ramp"	Karuna Kumar	Bhavani Rakesh	Sai Deva Harsha	2:52
4.	"Paralokam Paripodhama"	Lakshmi Bhoopal	G. V. Prakash Kumar	M. M. Manasi	3:15
5.	"Emanukoni"	Anantha Sriram	G. V. Prakash Kumar	G. V. Prakash Kumar	3:22

== Release and reception ==
The film was released in cinemas in Telugu, Hindi, Tamil, Kannada and Malayalam on 14 November 2024.

Sangeetha Devi Dundoo of The Hindu panned the film, criticising the writing as flat and cliched despite the plot's potential, but praised Varun Tej's and Chaudhary's acting and the atmosphere of the setting. Similarly, B. V. S. Prakash of the Deccan Chronicle gave the film one out of 5 stars, finding the screenplay, pacing and hero-centric characterisation to be major issues.

The film began streaming on Amazon Prime Video from 5 December 2024 in Telugu and dubbed versions of Tamil, Hindi, Malayalam and Kannada languages.
