= Narakasura (2023 film) =

- Theatrical release poster
- Directed by: Sebastian Noah Acosta Junior
- Written by: Sebastian Noah Acosta Junior
- Produced by: Dr.Ajja Sreenivas; Kurumuru Raghu
- Starring: Rakshit Atluri; Aparna Janardanan; Sangeerthana Vipin
- Cinematography: Nani Chamidisetty
- Edited by: Ch Vamshee Krishna
- Music by: AIS Nawfal Raja
- Production company: Sumukha Creations
- Release date: 3 November 2023
- Country: India
- Language: Telugu

Narakasura is a 2023 Indian Telugu-language film written and directed by Sebastian Noah Acosta Junior. The film stars Rakshit Atluri, Aparna Janardanan and Sangeerthana Vipin, while Nassar, Shatru, Charan Raj and Sriman play supporting roles. The music was composed by AIS Nawfal Raja with cinematography by Nani Chamidisetty and editing by Ch Vamshee Krishna.

== Plot ==
The film is set in a village near the Andhra Pradesh and Tamil Nadu border, where the protagonist, Shiva, works as a lorry driver in coffee and black peppercorn fields. The story unfolds as events lead Shiva to confront MLA Nagama Naidu's son Aadhi Naidu, triggering a series of dramatic events. The narrative delves into the reasons behind Shiva's anger towards Aadhi and reveals the connection of Keshava with the unfolding story. The movie explores themes of sacrifice, love, power, and a hidden romance amidst chaos and a transgender community's struggle. The climax of the film culminates in sacrifices and a cataclysmic clash.

== Cast ==
- Rakshit Atluri as Shiva
- Aparna Janardanan as Meenakshi
- Sangeerthana Vipin as Veeramani
- Nassar
- Shatru as Keshava
- Charan Raj as MLA Nagama Naidu
- Sriman as Inspector Sripathi
- Tej Charanraj as Aadhi Naidu
- Fish Venkat as Constable Venkat
- Mast Ali as Constable Ali
- SS Kanchi
- Gayatri Ravishankar
- Kaartheek Saahas
- Gara Raja Rao
- Bhanu Teja
- Lakshman
- Ramu
- Devangana
- Pintu Sharma
- Pramod Chaturved

== Soundtrack ==
Narakasura

Soundtrack album by AIS Nawaf Raja
- Released: 2023
- Recorded: 2022–2023
- Genre: Feature film soundtrack
- Language: Telugu
- Label: T-Series
- Producer: AIS Nawaf Raja

AIS Nawaf Raja chronology
Rudrangi (2023)	Narakasura (2023)

All music is composed by AIS Nawaf Raja.

Tracklist
No.	Title	Lyrics	Singer(s)	Length
1.	"Ninnu Vadhali"	Sriram Thapaswi	Chinmayi Sripaada, Vijay Prakash	5:04

== Reception ==
A critic from The Hans India wrote that "Sebastian Noah Acosta Junior initiated the narrative in an engaging manner, piquing interest by emphasizing the protagonist's disappearance".

A critic from OTTplay rated the film two out of five stars and wrote that "Overall, Narakasura attempts to shed light on transgender equality, but loses steam due to unnecessary commercial elements. A bit more seriousness in narration and impact in drama would have helped the plot a bit".
