= Karuna Kumar =

Indian film director

- Born: Andhra Pradesh, India
- Occupations: Film director; screenwriter
- Years active: 2020–present

Karuna Kumar is an Indian film director and screenwriter who works primarily in Telugu cinema. He is best known for directing the 2020 film Palasa 1978.

== Career ==
Karuna Kumar's debut film Palasa 1978 was released in March 2020 opening to positive reviews from the critics. The film revolves around the incidents related to caste discrimination and untouchability. It was featured in year-end best films' charts including Film Companion and The Times of India. His next directorial Metro Kathalu was released on streaming service Aha. Made as an anthology, The Times of India criticized Kumar's work and felt that the film "doesn’t have a fresh theme". He then directed Sridevi Soda Center featuring Sudheer Babu and Anandhi in lead roles. Writing for The Hindu, Sangeetha Devi Dundoo in her review, wrote that "With Sridevi Soda Center, Karuna Kumar takes a mainstream approach given the presence of actor Sudheer Babu and tries to keep the narrative gritty while discussing issues of honour". Others critics opined that the film could do much better in terms of screenplay.

Before the release of Sridevi Soda Center, in July 2021, The Hans India reported that Kumar has eight upcoming films. In November 2021, he walked out of the Telugu remake of the Malayalam film, Nayattu, over creative differences.

== Filmography ==
=== As director and writer ===
List of films
Year	Title
2020	Palasa 1978
2020	Metro Kathalu
2021	Sridevi Soda Center
2022	Kalapuram
2024	Matka
2026	Honey

=== As actor ===
Year	Title	Role
2020	Uma Maheswara Ugra Roopasya	Karuna
2025	Katha Kamamishu	Sridhar
2026	Chennai Love Story	
2026	ENE Repeat	Gopal

== Awards and nominations ==
List of awards and nominations received
Year	Award	Category	Work	Result	Ref.
2021	South Indian International Movie Awards	Best Debut Director – Telugu	Palasa 1978	Won	
2021	Santosham Film Awards	Best Debut Director	Palasa 1978	Won	
