= Napoleon (2017 film) =

Indian Telugu-language thriller film

- Official poster
- Directed by: Anand Ravi
- Written by: Anand Ravi
- Produced by: Bhogendra Gupta
- Starring: Anand Ravi; Komalee Prasad; Ravi Varma
- Cinematography: Margel David
- Music by: Sidharth Sadasivuni
- Release date: 24 November 2017
- Country: India
- Language: Telugu

Napoleon is a 2017 Indian Telugu-language thriller film directed by Anand Ravi starring himself, Komalee Prasad and Ravi Varma.

== Cast ==
- Anand Ravi as Napoleon
- Komalee Prasad as Sravanthi
- Ravi Varma as CI Ravi Varma

== Production ==
Writer Anand Ravi, who previously worked on Prathinidhi (2014), decided to make his acting debut with this film.

== Reception ==
A critic from Cinema Express opined, "The film, which tells the story of a man who has all kinds of quirks, starts out strong but loses the plot in the second half". A critic from The Week wrote, "The movie makes for an interesting watch but slightly drags in the second half". A critic from 123telugu said, "On the whole, Napoleon is a crime thriller which has some interesting moments here and there".
