= Katha Kamamishu =

2025 Indian Telugu-language film by Goutham–Karthik

- Promotional poster
- Directed by: Goutham–Karthik
- Screenplay by: Goutham–Karthik
- Story by: Goutham
- Produced by: Chinna Vasudeva Reddy
- Starring: Indraja; Karuna Kumar; Kruthika Roy Teresa; Krishna Prasad; Harshini Koduru; Venkatesh Kakumanu; Stuthee Roy; Moin
- Cinematography: Aravind Viswanathan
- Edited by: Vishal–Satya
- Music by: RR Dhruvan
- Production companies: iDream Media; Three Whistles Talkies
- Distributed by: Aha
- Release date: 2 January 2025
- Running time: 112 minutes
- Country: India
- Language: Telugu
- Budget: ₹10 crore

Katha Kamamishu is a 2025 Indian Telugu-language comedy drama film directed by Goutham–Karthik. The film features Indraja, Karuna Kumar, Kritika Roy, Krishna Prasad, Venkatesh Kakumanu, Stuthee Roy and Moin in lead roles. The film was released on 2 January 2025 on Aha.

== Plot ==
This is story of four couples facing the problem of physical intimacy after their marriage. Each couple has their own type of problem in getting close to each other. The indraja and karuna kumar are the couple who got married after their partners die, as they are in middle age they face the problem of entering in to each other personal space, like wise the other couples have their struggles and finally, how they overcome them is the plot.

== Cast ==
- Indraja as Kalpana
- Karuna Kumar as Sridhar
- Kritika Roy
- Krishna Prasad
- Harshini Koduru as Usha
- Venkatesh Kakumanu as Satya
- Stuthee Roy
- Moin
- Krishna Teja
- Gemini Suresh
- Ramana Bhargava
- Lakkimsetty
- Pammi Sai
- Madhumani
- Racha Ravi
- Pawon Ramesh
- Kadambari Kiran
- Prabhavathi
- Gundu Sudarshan
- Madhavi Prasad
- Rupa Lakshmi
- Vishal
- Pradeep
- Santosh
- Kalpana

== Release ==
Katha Kamamishu was originally scheduled to have a theatrical release, but had a direct-to-video release on Aha on 2 January 2025.

== Reception ==
Avad Mohammad of OTTPlay gave a rating of 2 out of 5 and stated, "Katha Kamamishu has a good point but is narrated in a very old-school manner. The biggest drawback is there is no pain in the emotions and everything is narrated in a simple manner".
