= Komalee Prasad =

Indian film actress

- Born: 24 August; Visakhapatnam, Andhra Pradesh, India
- Education: B.D.S, Pravara Institute of Medical sciences
- Occupation: Actress
- Years active: 2016–present

Komalee Prasad Vakalapudi is an Indian film actress who works in Telugu films.

== Early life ==
Komalee was born in Visakhapatnam, Andhra Pradesh and brought up in Ballari, Karnataka. She studied Dentistry at Pravara Institute of Medical Sciences, Loni, Ahmednagar following which she found her passion in Telugu film industry.

== Career ==
Komalee Prasad made her film debut with the Telugu film Nenu Seetha Devi in 2016. She later appeared in the Telugu films Anukunnadi Okati Ayinadi Okati in 2020 and Sebastian P.C. 524 in 2022. She also appeared in the web series Loser and in the anthology series Modern Love Hyderabad.

== Filmography ==
Key
†	Denotes film or TV productions that have not yet been released

Year	Title	Role(s)	Ref.
2016	Nenu Seetha Devi		
2017	Napoleon	Sravanthi	
2020	Anukunnadi Okati Ayinadi Okati	Komalee	
2021	Eda Thanunnado		
2022	Rowdy Boys	Shruthi	
2022	Sebastian P.C. 524	Neelima	
2022	HIT: The Second Case	Varsha	
2025	HIT: The Third Case	Varsha	
2025	Sasivadane	Sasi	

=== Television ===
Year	Title	Role	Network	Notes	Ref.
2020	Loser	Asha	ZEE5		
2022	Modern Love Hyderabad	Indu	Amazon Prime Video	Segment: Finding your Penguin	
2025	Touch Me Not	Meghana	JioHotstar		
