= Bad Girlz =

2025 film by Munna Dhulipudi

- Theatrical release poster
- Directed by: Phani Pradeep
- Written by: Munna Dhulipudi
- Produced by: Shashidhar Nalla; Emmadi Soma Narsaiah; Ramisetti Rambabu; Ravula Ramesh
- Starring: Anchal Gowda; Payal Chengappa; Roshini; Yashna; Rohan Surya; Moin; Renu Desai
- Cinematography: Arli Ganesh
- Edited by: B. Nageswara Reddy
- Music by: Anup Rubens
- Production companies: Prashvita Entertainment; Neeli Neeli Aakasam Creations; NVL Creations
- Release date: 25 December 2025
- Country: India
- Language: Telugu

Bad Girlz is a 2025 Indian Telugu-language romantic comedy-drama film directed by Phani Pradeep. The film is produced by Shashidhar Nalla, Emmadi Soma Narsaiah, Ramisetti Rambabu, and Ravula Ramesh under the banners Prashvita Entertainment, Neeli Neeli Aakasam Creations, and NVL Creations.

It stars Anchal Gowda, Payal Chengappa, Roshini, and Yashna in the lead roles, with Rohan Surya, Moin, and Renu Desai appearing in supporting roles.

== Plot ==
The film explores the emotional journeys and pre-marital freedoms of modern women, inspired by real-life experiences. It addresses themes of personal choice, empowerment, and societal expectations, focusing on how educated young women navigate relationships and independence in contemporary society.

== Cast ==
- Anchal Gowda
- Payal Chengappa
- Roshini
- Yashna
- Rohan Surya
- Moin
- Renu Desai

== Production ==
Following the commercial success of 30 Rojullo Preminchadam Ela, director Munna Dhulipudi announced Bad Girlz. Due to initial hesitation from established producers to support a project featuring newcomers, the film was self-financed by the director along with his associates.

The motion poster was unveiled at Prasad Labs in Hyderabad during a launch event attended by directors Chandoo Mondeti, Shiva Nirvana, and Krishna Chaitanya.

== Music ==
The film's soundtrack is composed by Anup Rubens. The first single, "Ila Chusukuntane", was launched by actor Rana Daggubati on social media.

The song is sung by Sid Sriram with lyrics by Chandrabose and was described as a spiritual successor to "Neeli Neeli Aakasam" from 30 Rojullo Preminchadam Ela.

Critical responses to the song highlighted Sid Sriram’s vocals and its emotional tone.

== Release ==
The film was released in theatres on 25 December 2025.
