= Kaalamega Karigindhi =

2025 Indian Telugu-language film by Singara Mohan

- Theatrical release poster
- Directed by: Singara Mohan
- Written by: Singara Mohan
- Produced by: Mare Siva Shankar
- Starring: Vinay Kumar; Shravani Majjari; Aravind Mudigonda; Nomina Tara
- Cinematography: Vineeth Pabbathi
- Edited by: Ra Yogesh
- Music by: Gudappan
- Production company: Singaara Creative Works
- Release date: 21 March 2025
- Running time: 110 minutes
- Country: India
- Language: Telugu

Kaalamega Karigindhi is a 2025 Indian Telugu-language romantic drama film written and directed by Singara Mohan. The film features Vinay Kumar, Shravani Majjari, Aravind Mudigonda and Nomina Tara in important roles.

The film was released on 21 March 2025.

== Plot ==
Phanindra, in his 30's goes back to school. While roaming around the school, he reminds of his first love. With his unanswered questions where is she now?, did she still love him etc.

== Cast ==
- Vinay Kumar as Phanindra
- Aravind Mudigonda as Young Phanindra
- Shravani Majjari as Bindu
- Nomina Tara as Young Bindu

== Music ==
All music is composed by Gudappan.

No.	Title	Lyrics	Singer(s)	Length
1.	"Vesavi Shishirama"	Singara Mohan	Surendra Adithe, Aishwarya Daruri	2:20
2.	"Dharee Dhaatina Moham"	Singara Mohan	Sai Madhav, Aishwarya Daruri	3:41
3.	"Oohalona Oosulaade"	Singara Mohan	Sai Madhav, Aishwarya Daruri	5:22
4.	"Vaalinaa Chooputho"	Singara Mohan	Surendra Adithe, Aishwarya Daruri	2:04
5.	"Gathamadhi Viduvadhi"	Singara Mohan	Ananya Sri	3:36
6.	"Thanu Jathagaa"	Sharath Chandra Thirunagari	Krishna Tejasvi	3:20
7.	"O Cheliya Naalona"	Singara Mohan	Ishaq Vali	3:28
8.	"Naa Yadhapai Vaale"	Singara Mohan	Aishwarya Daruri	1:58
9.	"Ye Dhaarilo Ye Malupulo"	Singara Mohan	Surendra Adithe, Ananya Sri	3:52

== Release and reception ==
Kaalamega Karigindhi was released on 21 March 2025.

Sakshi Post gave a rating of 2,75 out of 5 and wrote that "Singara Mohan crafts a simple yet deeply emotional tale, brought to life by sincere performances and technical brilliance". Aditya Devulapallu of Cinema Express rated the film 2 out of 5 and wrote that "Had Kaalamega Karigindhi trusted its own visual poetry a little more, had it let its silences speak, it might have created waves. Instead, it remains a film that leaves you both in awe of its craftsmanship and quietly longing for an intermission".
