= Sasivadane =

2025 Indian Telugu film by Sai Mohan Ubbana

- Theatrical release poster
- Directed by: Sai Mohan Ubbana
- Written by: Sai Mohan Ubbana
- Screenplay by: Mahesh Gorla
- Produced by: Ahiteja Bellamkonda; Abhilash Reddy Godala
- Starring: Rakshit Atluri; Komalee Prasad
- Cinematography: Saikumar Daara
- Edited by: Garry BH
- Music by: Score; Anudeep Dev; Songs; Anudeep Dev; Saravana Vasudevan
- Production company: AG Film Company
- Release date: 10 October 2025
- Country: India
- Language: Telugu

Sasivadane is a 2025 Indian Telugu-language romantic action drama film written and directed by Sai Mohan Ubbana. It stars Rakshit Atluri and Komalee Prasad in lead roles.

The film was released on 10 October 2025.

== Plot ==
Raghava (Rakshit Atluri) is a carefree young man from a peaceful village in the Godavari region, living with his widowed father and preparing to leave for his postgraduate studies. His life takes a turn when he meets Sasi (Komalee Prasad), a gentle and reserved girl from a nearby family. Their meetings gradually blossom into a sincere and affectionate romance, set against the serene rural backdrop.

However, their love soon meets strong opposition. Vasanth (Deepak Prince), a powerful and aggressive relative of Sasi, becomes obsessed with marrying her. Unable to accept Sasi's feelings for Raghava, he uses intimidation, manipulation, and family pressure to force her into submission. As tension grows, Raghava finds himself drawn into a dangerous conflict where love, honour, and personal freedom are at stake.

Despite multiple threats and attempts to separate them, Raghava remains determined to protect Sasi and stand up for their relationship. The story moves toward an emotionally intense climax as Raghava confronts the forces trying to control their lives.

Whether the couple overcomes the violence and social barriers surrounding them forms the emotional crux of Sasivadane, a tale of love tested by circumstance, ego, and power.

== Cast ==
- Rakshit Atluri as Gudipudi Raghava
- Komalee Prasad as Bellamkonda Sasi
- Sriman as Raghava's father
- Mahesh Achanta
- Deepak Vasanth Kumar
- Praveen Yandamuri
- Jabardasth Bobby

== Music ==
The background score is composed by Anudeep Dev. The soundtrack is composed by Anudeep Dev and Saravana Vasudevan.

No.	Title	Lyrics	Music	Singer(s)	Length
1.	"Sasivadane Title Song"	Kittu Vissapragada	Saravana Vasudevan	Haricharan, Chinmayi Sripada	3:40
2.	"DJ Pilla"	Kittu Vissapragada	Saravana Vasudevan	Vaisagh	3:29
3.	"Emito Emito"	Karunakar Adigarla	Saravana Vasudevan	P V N S Rohit	3:10
4.	"Vethika Ninnila"	Kittu Vissapragada	Saravana Vasudevan	Satya Yamini	3:15
5.	"Godari Atu Vaipo"	Kittu Vissapragada	Anudeep Dev	Anudeep Dev	3:03

== Release and reception ==
Sasivadane was released on 10 October 2025.

Eenadu praised the lead cast performances while being critical towards screenplay and narration. NTV rated it 2.5 out of 5 and praised the dialogues, and cinematography.
