= Sujeeth =

Indian filmmaker (born 1990)

- Born: Sujeeth Reddy; 26 October 1990 (age 36); Daburuvari Palli, Anantapur, Andhra Pradesh, India
- Education: L. V. Prasad Film and TV Academy
- Occupations: Film director; Screenwriter
- Years active: 2014–present
- Spouse: Pravallika Reddy

Sujeeth Reddy (born 26 October 1990) is an Indian film director and screenwriter who works in Telugu cinema. He made his directorial debut in with the Run Raja Run (2014). He received SIIMA Award for Best Debut Director – Telugu for the film.

== Early life ==
Sujeeth started creating short films at the age of 17 under the name Sujeeth Sign. He holds a film degree from the LV Prasad Film & TV Academy in Chennai and has created over 30 short films. In an interview Sujeeth stated that "I actually came into the film industry to work as an assistant director under Puri Jagannadh. But after meeting him, he suggested that I can start making films myself".

He got an opportunity to debut under UV Creations, with Run Raja Run (2014). Starring Sharwanand and Seerat Kapoor in the lead roles, it went to become a sleeper hit at the box office. Following the instant success of his debut, he developed a story for Prabhas. He narrated it to Prabhas during the shooting of Baahubali 2: The Conclusion. Titled Saaho (2019), it was shot simultaneously in Telugu, Hindi and some scenes reshot in Tamil with an ensemble cast of actors from different industries. However, unlike his debut success, Saaho was made with a huge budget of ₹350 crores, making it the second-costliest film in Telugu cinema, at the time. It opened from mixed-to-negative reviews, but was an above average grosser at the box-office.

Sujeeth then collaborated with Pawan Kalyan in the film They Call Him OG. The film was released in September 2025.

== Filmography ==
Key
†	Denotes films that have not yet been released

- Note: All films are in Telugu, unless otherwise noted

Year	Title	Notes	Ref
2014	Run Raja Run	Also made a cameo appearance as himself	
2019	Saaho	Simultaneously shot in Hindi	
2025	They Call Him OG	Also lyricist for the song "Washi Yo Washi"	
2027	Bloody Romeo †	Pre-Production	
2029	They Call Him OG 2 †	Pre-Production	

== Awards and nominations ==
Award	Year	Category	Work	Result	Ref.
Filmfare Awards South	2015	Best Director – Telugu	Run Raja Run	Nominated	
South Indian International Movie Awards	2015	Best Debut Director – Telugu	Run Raja Run	Won	
