= HMTV =

Indian Telugu-language television news channel

- Country: India
- Headquarters: Hyderabad, India

Programming
- Language: Telugu

Ownership
- Owner: Kapil Group
- Parent: Hyderabad Media Pvt. Ltd

History
- Launched: 12 February 2009
- Founder: K. Vaman Rao

Links
- Website: HMTVlive.com

HMTV is an Indian 24-hour Telugu news channel launched on 12 February 2009. The channel is operated by Hyderabad Media Pvt. Ltd, which also runs the English newspaper The Hans India. HMTV is a part of Kapil Group, promoted by K. Vaman Rao. Kapil Group is a business conglomerate of over 30 companies whose first company, Kapil Chit Funds was started in 1981.

== History ==
HMTV launched on 12 February 2009 as a 24-hour Telugu news channel. It is operated by Hyderabad Media House Ltd. The slogan of the channel is "Vaartha Aagadu, Nijam Daagadu".

HMTV is also the first Telugu news channel to have an ombudsman to carry out a critical review of its content and provide a conduit for viewers.

== Ownership ==
The channel is owned by Kapil Group, promoted by K. Vaman Rao. Kapil Group is a conglomerate of over 30 companies having presence in over 16 business activities.

Kapil Chit Funds, the first company of the group started in 1981 at Karimnagar by K. Vaman Rao, a Chartered Accountant by profession. It later diversified into sectors like construction, property management, hospitality, manufacturing, media, energy, agriculture, healthcare, finance, IT.

== Programming and reception ==
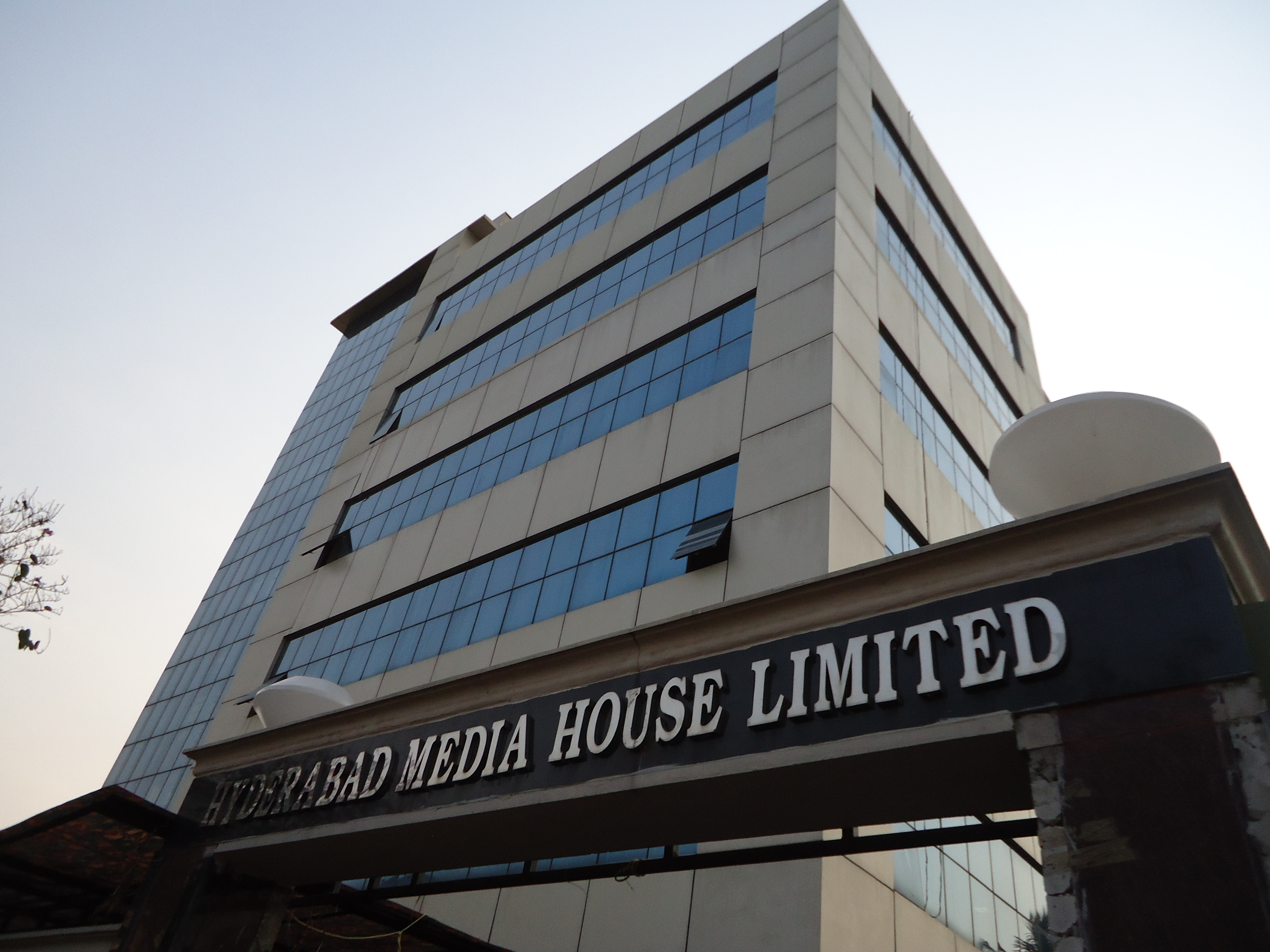
HMTV Media House office

The channel broadcasts shows such as "Jordar Varthalu", and "Nela Thalli". The public discussion program 'Dasa Disa' was widely acclaimed., 'Dasa Disa' on the channel gave them the confidence to venture into print media with The Hans India in July 2011. The channel has also been lauded for taking up issues like the girl child, building toilets in government schools, drinking water etc.
