= 1000 Waala =

Indian Telugu-language drama film

- Poster
- Directed by: Afzal Shaik
- Produced by: Sharukh
- Starring: Amith Dream Star; Sharukh Baig; Navitha Gangat
- Cinematography: Chandu Aj
- Edited by: Ravi Teja
- Music by: VamsiKanth Rekhana
- Production company: Super Hit Movie Makers
- Distributed by: SKML Motion Pictures
- Release date: 14 March 2025
- Country: India
- Language: Telugu

1000 Waala is a 2025 Indian Telugu-language drama film directed by Afzal. The film stars Amith Dream Star, Sharukh Baig and Navitha Gangat in the lead roles, alongside Mukhtar Khan, Pilla Prasad and Suman. The film was produced by Sharukh Baig under the banner of Super Hit Movie Makers.

== Cast ==
- Amith Dream Star
- Sharukh Baig
- Navitha Gangat
- Mukhtar Khan
- Pilla Prasad
- Suman

== Production ==
The film was directed by Afzal. Cinematography was by Chandu A J, while editing was handled by Ravi Teja. VamsiKanth Rekhana composed the soundtrack of the film.

== Reception ==
Sunil Boddula of News18 Telugu wrote that "Overall, '1000 Wala' is a film that will appeal not only to the mass but also to the family audience. It is a must-see in theaters this weekend."

Sakshi critic reviewed the film.
