= Vaibhavam =

2025 Indian Telugu film by Sathvik

- Theatrical release poster
- Directed by: Sathvik
- Written by: Sathvik
- Produced by: Ruthvik; Sathvik
- Starring: Ruthvik; Iqra Idrisi; Raghu G; Ananth Athreya; Yash Kyatam
- Cinematography: Sriram Mukkapati; Praveen Subramanyam
- Edited by: Sathvik
- Music by: Sathvik
- Production company: Rama Devi Productions LLP
- Release date: 23 May 2025
- Running time: 134 minutes
- Country: India
- Language: Telugu

Vaibhavam (transl. Glory) is a 2025 Telugu-language comedy-drama film. It is the directorial debut of Sathvik, who also composed the music for the film. It was produced by Ruthvik and Sathvik under the banner of Rama Devi Productions. The film features debutants Ruthvik and Iqra Idrisi in lead roles and was released on 23 May 2025.

== Plot ==
Vaibhav, a righteous young man, resigns from his job in pursuit of becoming an entrepreneur. When one of his friends lands in trouble: Vaibhav and others join hands to come to the rescue.

== Cast ==
- Ruthvik as Vaibhav
- Iqra Idrisi as Aarthi
- Raghu G as Anji
- Ananth Athreya as Srikar
- Arjun Jawabnavis as Vasu
- Yash Kyatam as Rajesh
- KLN Prasad as Gopal
- Savinder as Harsha Reddy

== Production ==
Vaibhavam is produced by Rama Devi Productions LLP. Majority of the actors were selected from an open casting call held by the makers of the movie.

== Music ==
The background score and soundtrack were composed by Sathvik, who also penned lyrics for all the songs.

Vaibhavam

Soundtrack album by Sathvik
- Released: 10 October 2024
- Recorded: 2024
- Genre: Feature film soundtrack
- Length: 7:43
- Language: Telugu
- Label: Rama Devi Productions
- Producer: Sathvik

=== Track listing ===
No.	Title	Lyrics	Singer(s)	Length
1.	"Palle Veedhullona"	Sathvik	Ritesh G Rao	3:40
2.	"Kalaganna"	Sathvik	Harini Ivaturi, Ruthvik	4:03
Total length:				7:43

== Release ==
=== Theatrical ===
Vaibhavam was released theatrically on 23 May 2025. The film received a U certificate from the Central Board of Film Certification.
