= London Babulu =

- Poster
- Directed by: Chinni Krishna
- Story by: M. Manikandan; Arul Chezhiyan
- Produced by: Maruthi
- Starring: Rakshit Atluri; Swathi Reddy
- Cinematography: Shyam K. Naidu
- Music by: K
- Release date: 10 November 2017
- Running time: 125 minutes
- Country: India
- Language: Telugu

London Babulu (transl. Men from London) is a 2017 Indian Telugu-language satirical comedy drama film directed by Chinni Krishna and produced by Maruthi.

It stars Swathi Reddy in the lead role along with Rakshith Atluri. The film was released on 10 November 2017. It is a remake of the 2016 Tamil film Aandavan Kattalai (2016). Rakshith won Best Debut Actor Award at 16th Santosham Film Awards.

Songs and background score for the film have been composed by K.

== Cast ==
- Rakshit Atluri as Gandhi
- Swati Reddy as Suryakantham
- Satya as Pandu
- Murali Sharma as Sharma
- Dhanraj as Bablu
- Ali as Kutumba Rao
- Satya Krishnan as Kutumba's assistant
- Raja Ravindra
- Jeeva
- Ajay Ghosh

== Soundtrack ==
K, who composed the soundtrack of the original, composed the soundtrack of this film too.

- "Ekkada Ekkada" – Karthik
- "Babu Jabu Vachera" – Deepak
- "Nightu Nine" – Saicharan, Shenbagaraj, Jiby, Depu, K, Deepak, Philip
- "Paapam Pilladevaro" – Anthony Daasan
- "Thirigi Thirigi" – K

== Reception ==
Sridhar Adivi from The Times of India gave the film a rating of two-and-a-half out of five stars and wrote that "The chemistry between the lead pair is just not established and it is unfortunate because there was ample scope for it". Hemanth Kumar from Firstpost wrote that "London Babulu delivers plenty of laughs and also makes you think why people are so desperate to go abroad through illegal means. And that is where it triumphs as a story. It has its heart in the right place".
