= 16th Santosham Film Awards =

2018 Tollywood award ceremony

- Awarded for: Excellence in cinematic and music achievements
- Presented on: 26 August 2018
- Date: 26 August 2018
- Site: JRC Convention, Hyderabad, India
- Hosted by: Sudigali Sudheer; Hari Teja
- Produced by: Kondeti Suresh
- Organised by: Santosham
- Magazine issue: Santosham

Highlights
- Lifetime achievement: S. Janaki

Television coverage
- Channel: Zee Telugu

The 16th Santosham Film Awards (Note: Also referred to in the news media as the "Santhosham South Indian Awards 2018") was an awards ceremony held at Hyderabad, India on 26 August 2018 recognized the best films and performances from the Tollywood films and music released in 2017, along with special honors for lifetime contributions and a few special awards. The awards are annually presented by Santosham magazine. The ceremony was announced on 3 August 2018 with Srikanth being the chief guest.

== Honorary Awards ==
- Santosham Lifetime Achievement Award – S. Janaki
- Santosham Sridevi Smarakam Award – Tamannaah Bhatia
- Santosham Allu Ramalingaiah Smarakam Award – Brahmaji
- Santosham Daggubati Ramanaidu Smarakam Award – Yerneni Naveen and Yelamanchili Ravi Shankar (Mythri Movie Makers)
- Santosham Akkineni Nageswara Rao Smarakam Award – Rajendra Prasad

== Main awards ==
=== Film ===
Award Category	Recipient	Film
Best Actor	Chiranjeevi	Khaidi No. 150
Best Actress	Shriya Saran	Gautamiputra Satakarni
Best Director	Sankalp Reddy	Ghazi
Best Supporting Actor	Naresh	Sathamanam Bhavati
Best Cinematographer	K. K. Senthil Kumar	Baahubali 2: The Conclusion
Best Dialogue	Sai Madhav Burra	Gautamiputra Satakarni
Best Debut Actor	Rakshith	London Babulu
Best Choreography	Sekhar	Khaidi No. 150
Best Stunts/ Action	Ram-Lakshman	Khaidi No. 150

=== Music ===
Award Category	Recipient	Single/Album (film)
Best Male Playback Singer	L. V. Revanth	"Teliseney Naa Nuvvey" from Arjun Reddy

== Special Jury Awards ==
- Special Jury Award (Alexander) – Jaya Prakash Reddy
- Special Jury Award for Best Actress – Mehreen Pirzada for Mahanubhavudu
- Special Jury Award for Best Actress – Eesha Rebba for Ami Thumi
- Special Jury Award for Best Actress – Mannara Chopra for Rogue

== Presenters ==
Category	Presenter(s)
Best Actor Award	S. Janaki
Best Actress Award	Chiranjeevi
Best Male Playback Singer	Chiranjeevi
Best Choreography	Chiranjeevi
Santosham Lifetime Achievement Award	Chiranjeevi
Santosham Sridevi Smarakam Award	Chiranjeevi
Special Jury Award for Best Actress – Mehreen Pirzada	K. Raghavendra Rao
Special Jury Award for Best Actress – Eesha Rebba	K. Raghavendra Rao
Special Jury Award (Alexander)	K. Raghavendra Rao
Santosham Allu Ramalingaiah Smarakam Award	Allu Aravind
Santosham Daggubati Ramanaidu Smarakam Award	D. Suresh Babu

== Performers ==
- Payal Rajput
- Mehreen Pirzada
