= Bimbisara (film) =

2022 film directed by Mallidi Vashist

- Theatrical release poster
- Directed by: Mallidi Vassishta
- Written by: Mallidi Vassishta
- Produced by: Kosaraju Harikrishna Nandamuri Kalyan Ram
- Starring: Nandamuri Kalyan Ram; Catherine Tresa; Samyuktha; Vivan Bhatena; Prakash Raj
- Cinematography: Chota K. Naidu
- Edited by: Tammiraju
- Music by: Songs: Chirrantan Bhatt; M. M. Keeravani; Score: M. M. Keeravani
- Production company: N. T. R. Arts
- Distributed by: Sri Venkateswara Creations
- Release date: 5 August 2022
- Running time: 146 minutes
- Country: India
- Language: Telugu
- Budget: ₹40 crore
- Box office: est. ₹65 crore

Bimbisara is a 2022 Indian Telugu-language fantasy action film written and directed by debutant Mallidi Vassishta and produced by Kosaraju Harikrishna, under N. T. R. Arts. It stars Nandamuri Kalyan Ram in a dual role alongside Catherine Tresa, Samyuktha, Vivan Bhatena and Prakash Raj. In the film, King Bimbisara of the Trigarta kingdom from the 5th century BC lands in the modern-day Hyderabad through time travel.

Principal photography of the film started in 2020 and ended in November 2021, with delays due to COVID-19 pandemic. Made on a budget of ₹40 crore, a major part of the film was shot at Ramakrishna Studios in Hyderabad. The film is scored by M. M. Keeravani who composed the songs with Chirrantan Bhatt.

Bimbisara was released on 5 August 2022.

== Plot ==
In 500 BC, a wanderer and his companion are chased in a forest by a troop of soldiers. They all fall into a sinkhole that leads to a cave. When the wanderer is fighting off the soldiers, skeletons come out from mysterious mirrors and pull the soldiers into them. The wanderer breaks one of the mirrors to escape, which liberates a demon from it. In gratitude, the demon gifts the wanderer a mirror that enables travel through time. In 1974, Shastri with the help of sorcerer Kethu tries to open Bimbisara's treasure chamber. However, Shastri is killed when he accidentally touches the door to save his son, Subramanya Shastri. The son grows up to be an acclaimed doctor who desires to open the treasure and fulfill his father's wish.

In the past, Bimbisara of the Trigartala Empire is a ruthless king who rules with an iron fist. He conquers kingdoms at will and has received several gifts including Sanjeevani which can revive the dead. Bimbisara plans to conquer the Asmaka kingdom next. He kills the Asmaka king and imprisons princess Ira when they refuse to kneel. Bimbisara then receives the mirror from the cave which he likes and keeps it in his bedroom. One day, he attacks a pious village that defies his orders. He retrieves from them Dhanvantari, a book of medicine, and kills a girl and the priest who predict his downfall. Later, Bimbisara is attacked by his twin brother Devadutta (the wanderer) who pushes Bimbisara into the mirror and takes his place as a noble emperor.

Through the mirror, Bimbisara lands unconsciously in modern-day Hyderabad in 2022 inside a truck. The truck driver throws him out onto the road and leaves. Bimbisara wakes up but is perplexed by the modern-day world. He wanders in the city aimlessly, breaking into every mirror that he can find in the hope of returning to his world. He is taken to the police station where SI Vyjayanthi and constable Prasadam try to use him to their advantage. Meanwhile, Kethu informs Shastri that Bimbisara has arrived, and they begin to search for him. Vyjayanthi and Bimbisara attend a conference where they find Vishwanandan Varma who claims to be a descendant of Bimbisara. They follow him to a place where Vishwanandan inaugurates Bimbisara's statue. A construction crane's beam is about to fall on Bimbisara, only to be saved by a girl, who is a look-alike of the girl whom he killed in the past.

Having a change of heart, Bimbisara befriends the girl and takes care of her. Shastri's men find him and kidnap the girl. Bimbisara thrashes them and rescues the girl, earning the trust of her grandfather Vishwanandan. Shastri then kills the girl's father and blackmails Bimbisara in arriving at the treasure's location. Shastri holds the girl's family as hostages and puts the girl on deathbed. He demands Bimbisara to open the treasure and bring Dhanvantari to save the girl. A severe famine has gripped Trigartala. Devadutta reveals himself and decides to open the treasure chamber. As the treasure door requires Bimbisara's handprint and voice to open, they start a Homam to circumvent it.

Commander Bagheera decides to kill Devdutta and take over the kingdom. Bimbisara's confidant Zubeda overhears the plot. He goes through the mirror in Bimbisara's room to find Bimbisara and lands at Salar Jung Museum. Bimbisara is unable to open the treasure due to the effect of Homam and Shastri gives him time until nightfall. Bimbisara prays to the goddess to give him a chance. Zubeda finds Bimbisara and tells him about Bagheera's treason. They travel back to the past together. Bagheera attacks Devadutta but Bimbisara arrives in time and kills Bagheera. The priest completes the Homam to open the door, though it is destined to cause Bimbisara's death. Bimbisara hands over Dhanvantari and his kingdom to Devadutta and returns to the present to save the girl. Shastri is furious to see Bimbisara returning empty-handed. His men attack him but Bimbisara kills them and Kethu. Bimbisara is fatally shot by Shastri moments before he kills him. He saves the girl with the treatment he brought from Trigartala and dies, just as Sanjeevani in Trigartala starts to shine.

== Cast ==
- Nandamuri Kalyan Ram in a dual roles as
  - King Bimbisara
  - Devadutta
- Samyuktha as S.I Vyjayanthi
- Catherine Tresa as Princess Ira
- Prakash Raj as Vishwanandan Varma
- Vivan Bhatena as Dr. Subramanya Shastri
- Vennela Kishore as Constable Prasadam
- Srinivasa Reddy as Minister Zubeda
- Brahmaji as Baburao
- Ayyappa P. Sharma as Kethu
- Rajeev Kanakala as Vishwanandan Varma's second son
- Sai Kiran as Vishwanandan Varma's eldest son
- Tanikella Bharani as the Ayurveda doctor
- Viva Harsha as Devadutta's companion
- Bharath Reddy as Subramanya Shastri's father
- Chammak Chandra
- Chandoo Sai
- Warina Hussain in the item number "Gul-e-bakavali"
- Rafsan Shahriar

== Production ==
In January 2020, debutant director Mallidi Vassishta Reddy approached actor Nandamuri Kalyan Ram for a historical fantasy film while the latter was shooting for NTR: Mahanayakudu (2019). Kalyan Ram, who was taken by fantasy and folklore films in Telugu cinema such as Pathala Bhairavi (1951), Jagadeka Veeruni Katha (1961), Aditya 369 (1991), Bhairava Dweepam (1994), and Yamadonga (2007), accepted the film.

The film was launched in 2020 under the tentative title NKR18, as it is intended to be 18th film of Kalyan Ram as a lead actor. Catherine Tresa, Samyuktha Menon, Vennela Kishore, Srinivasa Reddy and Ayyappa P. Sharma cast in key roles.

The title of the film was unveiled as Bimbisara in May 2021. Vasishta stated that the film does not follow the history of King Bimbisara of 5th century BC, however, they have taken the character and some of his attributes. Kalyan Ram said that Bimbisara was adapted as the title sometime after the story was finalized. Initially supposed to be stand-alone film, it is reported that story was split into two parts due to its length. However, the second part's production is reported to start later, depending on the reception of the first film.

Principal photography began in 2020. It was delayed due to the second wave of COVID-19 in India and resumed shooting in mid 2021. Large sets resembling ancient Indian kingdoms were set up at Ramakrishna Studios, Hyderabad. The shoot was completed by November 2021.

== Music ==
Originally, the background score and songs were supposed to be composed by Santosh Narayan and Chirantan Bhatt, respectively. However, Narayanan was replaced by M. M. Keeravani. Lyrics for the songs were written by Ramajogayya Sastry, Sreemani and Varikuppala Yadagiri. The first single titled "Eeswarude" was released on 13 July 2022. The second single titled "O Tene Palukula" was released on 21 July 2022.

Track listing
No.	Title	Lyrics	Music	Singer(s)	Length
1.	"Eeswarude"	Sreemani	Chirrantan Bhatt	Kaala Bhairava	4:18
2.	"O Tene Palukula"	Varikuppala Yadagiri	Chirrantan Bhatt	Hymath Mohammed, Satya Yamini	3:55
3.	"Neetho Unte Chalo"	M. M. Keeravani	M. M. Keeravani	Mohana Bhogaraju, Sandilya Pisapati	4:47
4.	"Vijayaho"	Chaitanya Prasad	M. M. Keeravani	Hemachandra, Sai Charan, Lokesh, Arun Koundinya, Raghuram, Harika Narayan, Nayana Nair, Poornima, Sri Soumya Gomathi	2:52
5.	"Bimbisara - Rap Song"	Lipsika	M. M. Keeravani	Lipsika, Adithya Iyengar, Prudhvi Chandra, Shivaradhya K.R.	1:50
6.	"Gulebakavali"	Ramajogayya Sastry	Chirrantan Bhatt	Chinmayi	3:56

== Release ==
=== Theatrical ===
Bimbisara was released on 5 August 2022. Originally it was scheduled to release in November 2021 but it was delayed due to the COVID-19 pandemic. A pre-release event was held in Hyderabad in July 2022 with Kalyan Ram's brother, actor Jr. NTR, as chief guest.

The worldwide theatrical rights of the film were sold for ₹15 crores. UFO Moviez has acquired the film's distribution rights for North India. In Andhra Pradesh and Telangana, the film was distributed by Dil Raju.

=== Home media ===
The digital distribution rights of the film were acquired by ZEE5. The film started streaming digitally on ZEE5 from 21 October 2022.

== Reception ==
=== Box office ===
On its opening day, Bimbisara collected a gross collection of ₹11.50 crore (US$1.2 million) worldwide. It has collected a distributors' share of ₹7.27 crore (US$750,000) worldwide, including ₹6.30 crore (US$650,000) from Andhra Pradesh and Telangana. The film grossed ₹30 crore (US$3.1 million) worldwide in its first weekend with a distributors' share of ₹18.29 crore (US$1.9 million), reportedly entering into profit zone within three days. In nine days, the film collected a total gross of $500K (₹3.98 crore) at the United States box office.

=== Critical response ===
Bimbisara received mixed to positive reviews from critics. A reviewer from The Times of India rated the film 3.5 out of 5 stars and wrote "The movie's first half is a runaway hit, and the second half could have been better. Kalyan Ram as Bimbisara was brilliant probably his best performance to date". Bhuvanesh Chandar of The Hindu gave a mixed review and stated–"Bimbisara is filled with intriguing ideas that could have made for an engaging watch. It's definitely a refreshing take on an age-old formula". Sowmya Rajendran of The News Minute rated the film 2.5 out of 5 stars and wrote "Bimbisara is entertaining in parts, and is anchored mainly by Kalyan Ram's performance. It would have worked better if Vashishta hadn't tried to tick every box in the masala film genre and trusted the material more". Another critic wrote that "All that director Vassishta does is to give a timely upgrade to the socio-fantasy genre within the formula of a masala film and extracts commendable performances from his cast. This is undoubtedly Kalyan Ram's career best".

News18 also praised story, screenplay and music, while stating that the film has no strong female character. Praising Kalyan Ram's performance, Murali Krishna Ch of The New Indian Express felt that Kalyan Ram's entry into his kingdom reminded the iconic N. T. Rama Rao as Duryodhana from Daana Veera Soora Karna (1977).

== Future ==
In July 2022, Kalyan Ram announced plans to turn Bimbisara into a four-part franchise, with the second installment set to release in 2024. However, due to creative differences between Kalyan Ram and Vassishta, the latter exited the project as director. He was later replaced by his VFX supervisor and director, Anil Paduri, to direct the prequel to the film.
