= The Hans India =

English-language newspaper in India

- Cover of The Hans India on 8 August 2016
- Type: Daily newspaper
- Format: Broadsheet
- Owner: Hyderabad Media House Ltd.
- Publisher: K. Hanumantha Rao
- Editor: P Madhusudhan Reddy
- Founded: 15 July 2011; 14 years ago
- Language: English
- Headquarters: Hyderabad, India
- Circulation: 78000+
- Website: thehansindia.com

The Hans India is an Indian English-language daily newspaper published in the states of Andhra Pradesh and Telangana as well as in New Delhi. The newspaper was launched on 15 July 2011 and is owned to Hyderabad Media House Ltd., which also owns Telugu-language news channel HMTV. The chief editor is P Madhusudhan Reddy

The Hans India is a part of Kapil Group, promoted by K. Vaman Rao. Kapil Group is a business conglomerate of over 30 companies whose first company, Kapil Chit Funds was started in 1981.

== Name ==
The name of the newspaper – The Hans India – has been derived from the word 'hans', meaning swan in Hindi.

K. Ramachandra Murthy, MD and CEO of Hyderabad Media House at the time, noted, "We chose the swan as the symbol for HMTV and also named our paper after this bird as it has the ability to separate milk from water. In the same way, we aim to separate truth from untruth and fact from fiction." The paper has the tagline 'Free, Frank, and Fearless'.

== History ==
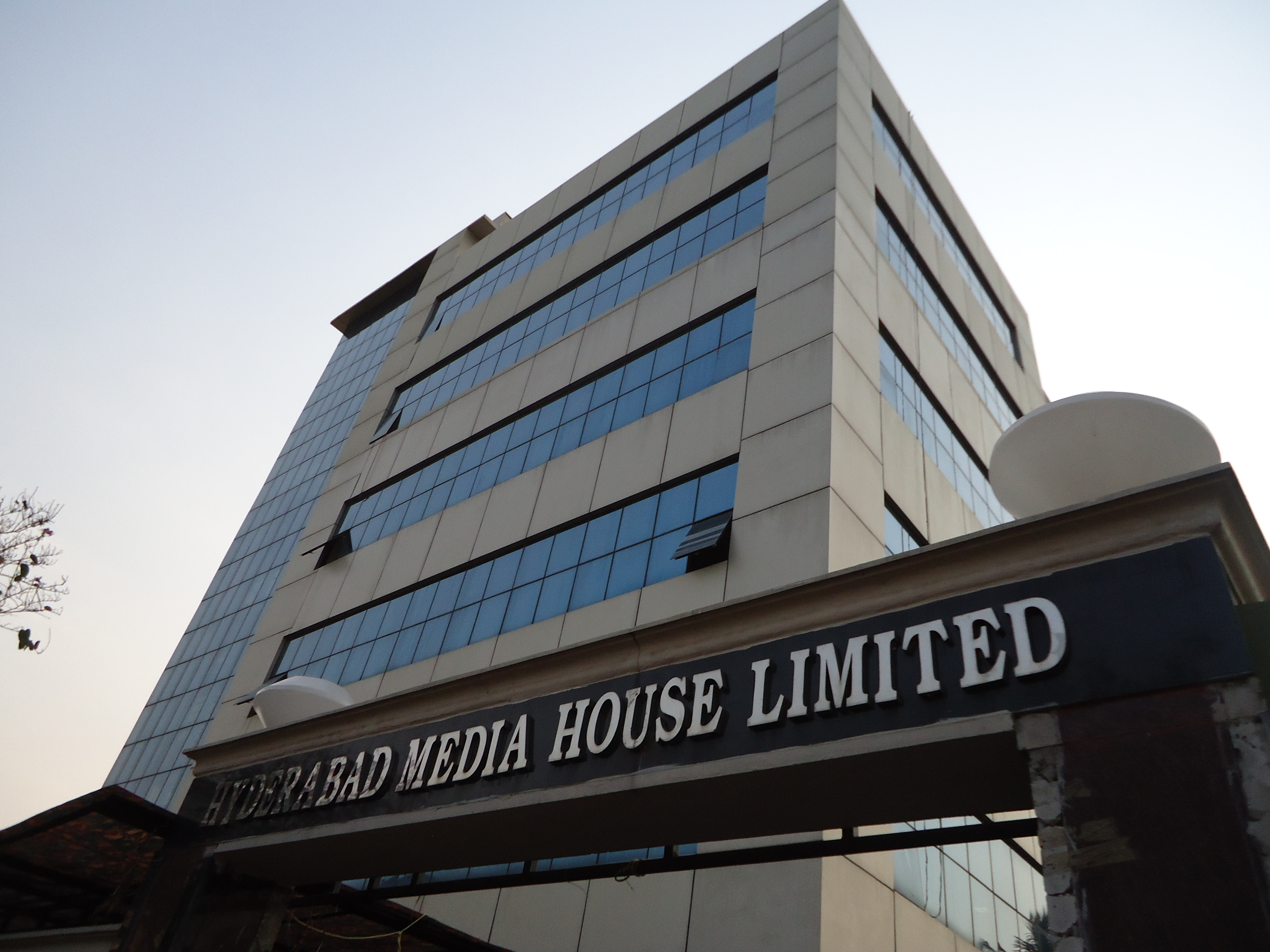
Hyderabad Media House office

Hyderabad Media House Ltd. which operated the Telugu news channel HMTV, expanded into print media with the launch of The Hans India, an English-language daily newspaper. The newspaper was started on 15 July 2011.

K. Ramachandra Murthy, MD and CEO of Hyderabad Media House at the time, mentioned that the programme, 'Andhra Dasa Disa' on HMTV gave them the confidence to venture into print media. PNV Nair, who earlier worked as the Editor at Deccan Chronicle, was the first Editor of Hans India.

Hans India started with its primary focus on Andhra Pradesh (which included Telangana) apart from national and global news. It was launched with five editions from Hyderabad, Visakhapatnam, Vijayawada, Warangal, and Tirupati. Later, it also added editions from Amaravati, Khammam, Kurnool, and New Delhi.

== Ownership ==
The Hans India is owned by Kapil Group, promoted by K. Vaman Rao. Kapil Group is a conglomerate of over 30 companies having presence in over 16 business activities.

Kapil Chit Funds, the first company of the group started in 1981 at Karimnagar by K. Vaman Rao, a Chartered Accountant by profession. It later diversified into sectors like construction, property management, hospitality, manufacturing, media, energy, agriculture, healthcare, finance, IT.

== Content ==
Hans India publishes 20 pages of news, views, reviews, and information about the nation, world, technology, business, sports, and entertainment. At its launch, the newspaper had regular columns by journalists like Kuldip Nayar, M. V. Kamath, Nilotpal Basu, George Verghese, and Pallavi Ghosh.

The paper was launched with two supplements – Hyderabad Hans and Sunday Hans. Hyderabad Hans is a four-page, city-centric pullout, printed everyday. Sunday Hans is an eight-page pullout with features about food fests, travel, counseling etc. The main newspaper also includes pages dedicated to education, health, and property.

The Hans India also launched a business focused news website Bizz Buzz in Nov, 2020.
