= Nani filmography =

Indian film actor filmography

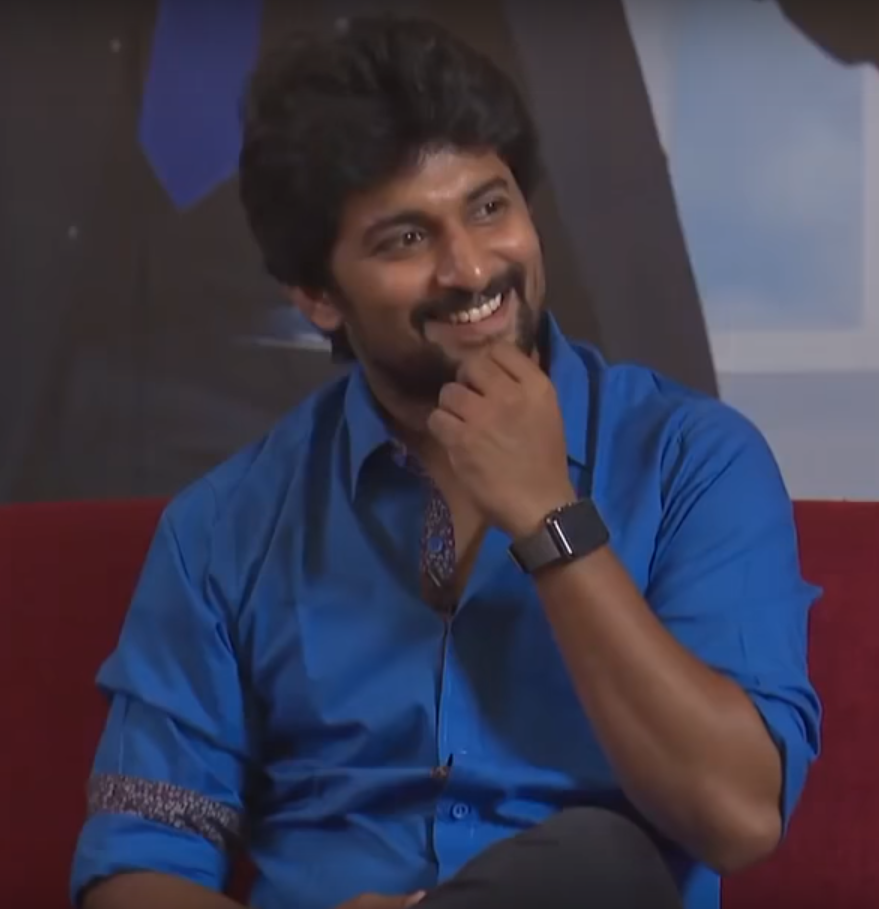
Nani in 2018

Nani is an Indian actor, film producer and television presenter who works predominantly in Telugu films. Considered as one of the highest paid and leading actors of Telugu Cinema, He made his acting debut with Mohana Krishna Indraganti's 2008 comedy film Ashta Chamma, an Indian adaptation of Oscar Wilde's play The Importance of Being Earnest. After Ashta Chamma's commercial success, Nani played the lead roles in three Telugu films in the next two years: Ride (2009), Snehituda (2009) and Bheemili Kabaddi Jattu (2010). In 2011, Nani collaborated with B. V. Nandini Reddy on the romantic comedy film Ala Modalaindi which was profitable. The same year, he made his Tamil cinema debut with Anjana Ali Khan's Veppam, a crime drama set in the backdrop of North Chennai. The following year, Nani collaborated with S. S. Rajamouli and Gautham Vasudev Menon on the Telugu-Tamil bilingual Eega and the romance film Yeto Vellipoyindhi Manasu respectively. The former, which was about a murdered man reincarnating as a housefly and avenging his death, earned Nani an award in the Best Hero category at the 2013 Toronto After Dark Film Festival. He received the Nandi Award for Best Actor for his performance in Yeto Vellipoyindhi Manasu.

Nani ventured into film production in 2013 as a co-producer for the film D for Dopidi. He faced three box office failures in the upcoming years: Paisa (2013), Aaha Kalyanam (2014) and Janda Pai Kapiraju (2015). Nani termed it a "low phase" in his career and worked on the "planning of films and the timing of their release". He then played the lead role in Nag Ashwin's Yevade Subramanyam (2015), a film focusing on a businessperson's journey to the Himalayas seeking self exploration. Nani later starred in Maruthi's comedy film Bhale Bhale Magadivoy (2015), in which he played an absent minded scientist easily prone to distraction. It was the actor's first blockbuster success, and earned him the Critics Award for Best Actor – South at the 63rd Filmfare Awards South ceremony. With his subsequent releases, the profitable ventures Krishna Gaadi Veera Prema Gaadha (2016) and Gentleman (2016), he gained stardom in Telugu cinema. Nani later played the lead in the commercially successful Telugu films Majnu (2016), Nenu Local (2017), Middle Class Abbayi (2017), and Ninnu Kori (2017). In 2018, Nani featured as the host of the second season of the Telugu game show Bigg Boss.

== Film ==
=== Actor ===
Key
†	Denotes films that have not yet been released

- All films are in Telugu, unless otherwise noted.

List of Nani film acting credits
Year	Title (Note: Films are listed in the order of their release date.)	Role(s)	Notes	Ref.
2008	Ashta Chamma	Rambabu / Mahesh Babu (Note: Nani played a single character with two or more names.)		
2009	Ride	Arjun		
2009	Snehituda	Sai		
2010	Bheemili Kabaddi Jattu	Suribabu		
2011	Ala Modalaindi	Gautham		
2011	Veppam	Karthik	Tamil film	
2011	Pilla Zamindar	Praveen Jayaramaraju "PJ"		
2012	Eega	Nani	Telugu-Tamil bilingual	
2012	Yeto Vellipoyindhi Manasu	Varun Krishna		
2012	Neethaane En Ponvasantham	Train passenger	Tamil film; cameo appearance	
2014	Paisa	Prakash		
2014	Aaha Kalyanam	Shakthivel	Tamil film	
2014	Nimirndhu Nil	Narasimha Reddy's friend	Tamil film; cameo appearance in "Rajadhi Raja" song	
2015	Janda Pai Kapiraju	Aravind Shivashankar / Maya Kannan (Note: Nani played two characters.)		
2015	Yevade Subramanyam	Subramanyam		
2015	Bhale Bhale Magadivoy	Lucky		
2015	Dongaata	Himself	Cameo appearance	
2015	Superstar Kidnap	Himself	Cameo appearance	
2016	Krishna Gaadi Veera Prema Gaadha	Krishna		
2016	Gentleman	Gautham / Jai		
2016	Majnu	Aditya		
2016	Jyo Achyutananda	Jyo's boyfriend	Cameo appearance	
2017	Nenu Local	Babu		
2017	Ninnu Kori	Dr. P. Uma Maheswara Rao		
2017	Middle Class Abbayi	Nani		
2018	Krishnarjuna Yudham	Krishna / Arjun Jayaprakash		
2018	Devadas	Dr. Das		
2018	Neevevaro	Customer	Cameo appearance	
2019	Jersey	Arjun	Also dubbed for Harish Kalyan	
2019	Nani's Gang Leader	"Pencil" Parthasarathy		
2020	V	Major Yendluri Vishnu	25th film	
2021	Tuck Jagadish	MRO Jagadish Naidu		
2021	Shyam Singha Roy	Shyam Singha Roy / Vasudev Ghanta		
2022	Ante Sundaraniki	Kasthuri Poorna Venkata Sesha Sai Pavana Rama Sundara Prasad "Sundar"		
2022	HIT: The Second Case	Arjun Sarkaar IPS	Cameo appearance	
2023	Dasara	Dharani		
2023	Hi Nanna	Viraj		
2024	Saripodhaa Sanivaaram	Surya		
2025	HIT: The Third Case	Arjun Sarkaar IPS		
2026	The Paradise	Jadal alias "Sarakka"		
2027	Bloody Romeo †	Romeo	Filming	

=== Producer ===
List of Nani film producer credits
Year	Title	Notes	Ref.
2013	D for Dopidi		
2018	Awe		
2020	HIT: The First Case	Presenter	
2022	HIT: The Second Case	Presenter	
2025	HIT: The Third Case		
2025	Court: State vs a Nobody	Presenter	
2026	Alias Rukmini		
2027	Bloody Romeo	Pending film	

=== Voice artist ===
List of Nani voice film roles
Year	Title	Role	Actor	Notes	Ref.
2013	D for Dopidi	Narrator	—N/a		
2018	Amoli	Narrator	—N/a	Telugu version	
2018	Ee Maaya Peremito	Narrator	—N/a		
2015	OK Bangaram	Adhi	Dulquer Salmaan	Telugu version	
2018	Awe	Nani	Fish		
2019	Jersey	Adult Nani	Harish Kalyan	Cameo role	
2019	The Lion King	Simba	Donald Glover	Telugu version	

=== Other crew positions ===
List of Nani other film roles
Year	Title	Notes	Ref.
2005	Radha Gopalam	Assistant director	
2005	Allari Bullodu	Assistant director and Clap Assistant	
2006	Asthram	Assistant director	
2007	Dhee	Assistant director	

== Television ==
Year	Title	Role	Network	Notes	Ref.
2015	Meelo Evaru Koteeswarudu 2	Guest contestant	Star Maa		
2017	2nd IIFA Utsavam	Host	Gemini TV	Television special	
2017	Meelo Evaru Koteeswarudu 4	Guest contestant	Star Maa		
2018	Bigg Boss 2	Host	Star Maa		
2022	Meet Cute	—N/a	SonyLIV	Producer	
2023	Kumari Srimathi	Himself	Amazon Prime Video	Cameo	

== Music Videos ==
List of Nani's appearances in Music videos
Year	Title	Role(s)	Notes	Ref.
2021	Dhaare Leda	Himself	Special appearance Also Producer	
