= HIT (film series) =

Shared fictional universe

- Created by: Sailesh Kolanu
- Original work: HIT: The First Case (2020)
- Owners: Wall Poster Cinema; Unanimous Productions
- Years: 2020–present

Films and television
- Film(s): HIT: The First Case (2020); HIT: The Second Case (2022); HIT: The Third Case (2025)

Audio
- Soundtrack(s): HIT: The First Case (2020); HIT: The Second Case (2022); HIT: The Third Case (2025)

Miscellaneous
- Budget: Total (3 films): est. ₹91.2 crores
- Box office: Total (3 films): est. ₹174.45 crores

HIT is an Indian crime thriller film series created by Sailesh Kolanu. The title is an acronym for "Homicide Intervention Team".

The first film, HIT: The First Case, was released on 28 February 2020, the second, HIT: The Second Case, on 2 December 2022, and the third, HIT: The Third Case, on 1 May 2025. It is currently the 6th highest-grossing Telugu film series worldwide.

== Development ==
“I had written both the stories based on news reports in other countries, and it is eerie to see such real-life similarities prior to the release of these films,” says Sailesh.

On 24 October 2019, the ceremonial puja for The First Case was held and production for the film commenced. Nani and Prashanti Tipirneni produced the film under "Wall Poster Cinema" banner. This film is their second venture after Awe. A teaser was launched on 1 January 2020.

After the success of HIT: The First Case, Nani announced a sequel in February 2021, one year after the film's release. Sailesh Kolanu who directed the first film of the franchise would be directing this. Adivi Sesh has replaced Vishwak Sen in the sequel. Nani wanted the franchise to be "concept oriented" rather than "star oriented," so he moved the setting from Telangana to Andhra Pradesh and chose Sesh as the protagonist. Meenakshi Chaudhary was cast opposite Sesh. Sen said he missed out on the sequel due to scheduling conflicts, and wished he'd be part of HIT 3 or 4.

== Films ==
Film	Protagonist	Release date	Director	Production House
HIT: The First Case	Vishwak Sen	28 February 2020	Sailesh Kolanu	Wall Poster Cinema
HIT: The Second Case	Adivi Sesh	2 December 2022	Sailesh Kolanu	Wall Poster Cinema
HIT: The Third Case	Nani	1 May 2025	Sailesh Kolanu	Wall Poster Cinema; Unanimous Productions

=== HIT: The First Case (2020) ===
Vikram Rudraraju, is an SP in HIT at Hyderabad, where he is assigned to investigate the missing case of an 18 year-old girl Preethi. HIT: The First Case is the first installment of the HIT Universe, which stars Vishwak Sen in the lead role, along with Ruhani Sharma.

=== HIT: The Second Case (2022) ===
Krishna Dev, shortly known as KD is an SP in HIT at Visakhapatnam, is assigned to catch a serial killer, who is responsible for gruesome murders of several women. The film stars Adivi Sesh, and Meenakshi Chaudhary.

=== HIT: The Third Case (2025) ===
Arjun Sarkaar, an SP in HIT Jammu and Kashmir is transferred to Visakhapatnam to catch a group of serial killers who are responsible for the gruesome murders of several people. The film stars Nani and Srinidhi Shetty.

== Cast and characters ==
List indicators

This section includes characters who will appear or have appeared in HIT Universe.

- An empty grey cell indicates the character was not in the film, or that the character's official presence has not yet been confirmed.
- ^{A} indicates an appearance through archival footage or audio.
- ^{C} indicates a cameo role.
- ^{V} indicates a voice-only role.

Actor	Films		
Actor	HIT: The First Case (2020)	HIT: The Second Case (2022)	HIT: The Third Case (2025)
Vishwak Sen	Vikram Rudaraju	Vikram Rudaraju^{A}	
Adivi Sesh		Krishna Dev (K.D)	Krishna Dev (K.D)^{C}
Nani		Arjun Sarkaar^{C}	Arjun Sarkaar
Karthi			Veerappan^{C}
Ruhani Sharma	Neha		
Meenakshi Chaudhary		Aarya	
Srinidhi Shetty			Mrudula
Maganti Srinath	Abhilash	Abhilash	Abhilash^{C}
Brahmaji	R. Shinde	R. Shinde	
Bhanu Chander	Vishwanath	Vishwanath^{A}	
Rao Ramesh		Nageswara Rao	Nageswara Rao
Komalee Prasad		Varsha	Varsha

== Reception ==
=== Box office performance ===
Film	Release date	Budget	Box office revenue
HIT: The First Case	28 February 2020	₹6.2 crore (US$836,711.67)	₹12.6 crore (US$1.7 million)
HIT: The Second Case	2 December 2022	₹15 crore (US$1.91 million)	₹41.85 crore (US$5.32 million)
HIT: The Third Case	1 May 2025	₹70 crore (US$7.3 million)	₹120 crore (US$12 million)
Total		₹91.2 crore (US$9.5 million) (three films)	₹174.45 crore (US$18 million) (three films)
