= Sailesh Kolanu =

Indian director, screenwriter

Sailesh_Kolanu
- Born: Madras, Tamil Nadu, India
- Occupations: Film director; screenwriter
- Years active: 2020–present

Sailesh Kolanu is an Indian film director and screenwriter who predominantly works in Telugu cinema. He is known for hit film series in Telugu cinema

== Early life and family ==
Sailesh was born and raised in Chennai, Tamil Nadu, where his father, Seshagiri Rao Kolanu, was a production manager for Pratap Art Productions and then worked for late filmmaker, Kodi Ramakrishna. He graduated in Optometry from LV Prasad Eye Institute. He further pursued his PhD in optometry from the University of New South Wales, before pursuing a career as a filmmaker.

== Career ==
Kolanu began his career with the 2018 short film, Checklist, which was made for I F P's 50-hour filmmaking challenge. He went on to direct his first feature film, HIT: The First Case produced by Nani. It was a box-office success. In 2022, he went on to create the HIT Universe, with the release of second film of the franchise, HIT: The Second Case. He announced HIT: The Third Case, during the mid-credits scene of HIT: The Second Case, starring Nani. Furthermore, after the release of “HIT: The Third Case”, Sailesh Kolanu teased Karthi as ACP Veerappan for the next movie in the franchise, “HIT: The Fourth Case”.

== Filmography ==
=== As director ===
Key
†	Denotes films that have not yet been released

Year	Title	Language	Notes
2020	HIT: The First Case	Telugu	Debut; First installment in HIT Universe
2022	HIT: The First Case	Hindi	Remake of HIT: The First Case
2022	HIT: The Second Case	Telugu	Second installment in HIT Universe
2024	Saindhav	Telugu	
2025	HIT: The Third Case	Telugu	Third Installment in the HIT Universe
2026	Emo Emo Idi	Telugu	
TBA	HIT: The Fourth Case	Telugu	Fourth Installment in the HIT Universe

=== As playback singer ===
Year	Song	Film	Composer	Lyricist	Ref.
2022	"Poratame"	HIT: The Second Case	Suresh Bobilli		
