= Ichata Vahanamulu Niluparadu =

2021 Telugu-language Indian film

- Theatrical release poster
- Directed by: S. Darshan
- Written by: S. Darshan
- Produced by: Aditya Shastri; Isha Shastri; Harish Koyalagundla
- Starring: Sushanth; Meenakshi Chaudhary; Vennela Kishore; Priyadarshi
- Cinematography: M. Sukumar
- Edited by: Garry BH
- Music by: Praveen Lakkaraju
- Production companies: AI Studios; Shaastra Movies
- Distributed by: Annapurna Studios; Asian Cinemas
- Release date: 27 August 2021
- Running time: 155 minutes
- Country: India
- Language: Telugu

Ichata Vahanamulu Niluparadu (transl. 'No parking here'), also known by the initialism IVNR, is an Indian Telugu-language romantic drama thriller film produced by Aditya Shastri, Harish Koyalagundla and Isha Shastri and written and directed by S. Darshan. The film stars Sushanth, Meenakshi Chaudhary (in her Telugu debut), Vennela Kishore, and Priyadarshi. The plot is inspired by real events and tells the story of the aftermath of a parking incident in a colony, which is blocked by a local gangster and his men. The film was theatrically released on 27 August 2021.

== Cast ==
- Sushanth as Arun
- Meenakshi Chaudhary as Meenakshi "Meenu" Yadav, Narasimha's sister
- Vennela Kishore as Sukku, Arun's friend and employee of the Royal Enfield showroom
- Priyadarshi as Puli, Arun's best friend
- Venkat as Narasimha Yadav, Meenu's brother
- Abhinav Gomatam as Abhinav, Narasimha's brother-in-law
- Ravi Varma as Bhushan, Ex-corporator
- Aishwarya as Padma, Arun's mother
- Krishna Chaitanya as CI Rudra
- Samrat Shanmugavel as Puli's brother
- Varanasi Soumya as Jhansi, TV serial actress
- Harish Koyalagundla as Matter Ranjith
- Nikhil Kailasa as Arun's friend
- Sunil as Actor (cameo appearance)

== Production ==
The film was launched on 30 January 2020 with the debut of S. Darshan as director and Meenakshi Chaudhary in her Telugu debut. Sushanth was cast as the male lead. In September 2020 shooting of the film resumed after a stoppage due to the COVID pandemic. The post-production work was completed in March 2021.

== Release ==
Ichata Vahanamulu Niluparadu was theatrically released on 27 August 2021 in more than 300 theatres across India and over 100 theatres internationally including theatres in Singapore and the United States. It was one of the first films which had a theatrical release after the cinemas opened after the second wave of the COVID pandemic. Hindi rights for the film have been sold to Sony Entertainment.

The film has been available for streaming on aha streaming service since 17 September 2021.

== Soundtrack ==
Ichata Vahanamulu Niluparadu

Soundtrack album by Praveen Lakkaraju
- Released: 2021
- Recorded: 2020–2021
- Genre: Feature film soundtrack
- Length: 14:55
- Language: Telugu
- Label: Aditya Music

Praveen Lakkaraju chronology
Ek Mini Katha (2021)	Ichata Vahanamulu Niluparadu (2021)
External audio
- Juke box on YouTube
- Audio album on JioSaavn

The soundtrack was composed by Praveen Lakkaraju to lyrics by Sreejo, Arun Vemuri, Srinivasa Mouli, RollRida and Suresh Gangula.

Track list
No.	Title	Lyrics	Singer (s)	Length
1.	"Hey Manasendukila"	Sreejo	Armaan Malik, Ramya Behara	4:16
2.	"Padmavyuham"	Arun Vemuri	Kala Bhairava	2:11
3.	"Nee Valle Nee Valle"	Srinivasa Mouli	Sanjith Hegde	3:10
4.	"Basthi Pogaru"	RollRida	RollRida, Mohana Bhogaraju	2:56
5.	"Bandi Thiyy" (Promotional Song)	Suresh Gangula	Rahul Sipligunj	2:22
Total length:				14:55

== Reception ==
Sravan Vanaparthy, writing for Times of India gave the film two stars out of five and felt that the first half was rather slow. He criticized the screenplay and editing as he wrote, "The screenplay and choppy editing are a let-down." He opined that the performance of actors and background music was just okay. Vanaparthy concluded the review by calling "The story of Ichata Vahanamulu Nilupa Radu has potential that’s left unexplored. This one’s a difficult one to sit through." Y Sunita Chowdhary of The Hindu criticized the film for its writing. She didn't like the characterization and wrote, "There are several characters in the film, many of them with dramatic entries, but their actions lack intensity or impact." Chowdhary wrote that Sunil and Vennela Kishore made her smile but for the lead cast, she said, "This isn’t the best we’ve seen from Sushanth and Meenakshi has a long way to go in terms of acting."

Sarah Justin reviewing for Sakshi Post rated the film with 2.5 stars out of 5 and wrote, "Sushanth has experimented with this film. However, the script lacks the punch required to elevate him as the hero. Can be watched for timepass."
