= Nani (actor) =

Indian actor and film producer (born 1984)

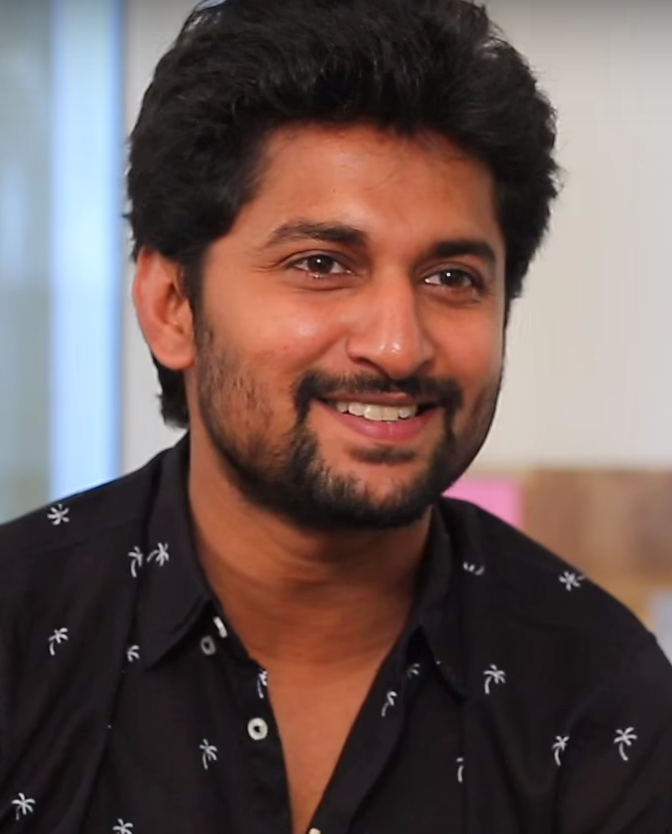
- Nani in 2017
- Born: Ghanta Naveen Babu; 24 February 1984 (age 42); Hyderabad, Telangana, India
- Education: Wesley Degree College
- Occupations: Actor; producer; television presenter
- Years active: 2008–present
- Works: Full list
- Spouse: Anjana Yelevarthy (m. 2012)
- Children: 1
- Awards: Full list

Ghanta Naveen Babu (born 24 February 1984), known professionally as Nani, is an Indian actor and producer who predominantly works in Telugu cinema. Nani is one of the highest-paid and most popular Telugu actors. He is a recipient of several accolades including two Nandi Awards, three Filmfare Awards South and four SIIMA Awards.

Nani made his debut in 2008 starring in the successful romantic comedy Ashta Chamma, and broke through with Ala Modalaindi (2011). He went on to star in commercially successful films such as Pilla Zamindar (2011), Eega (2012) and Yevade Subramanyam (2015), further establishing his career. He won the Nandi Award for Best Actor for Yeto Vellipoyindhi Manasu (2012).

Nani established himself as a leading actor with critical and commercial success through films like Bhale Bhale Magadivoy (2015), Krishna Gaadi Veera Prema Gaadha (2016), Gentleman (2016), Nenu Local (2017), Ninnu Kori (2017), Middle Class Abbayi (2017), Jersey (2019), Nani's Gang Leader (2019), Shyam Singha Roy (2021), Ante Sundaraniki (2022), Dasara (2023), Hi Nanna (2023), Saripodhaa Sanivaaram (2024) and HIT: The Third Case (2025). Nani won two Filmfare Critics Award for Best Actor – Telugu for Bhale Bhale Magadivoy and Shyam Singha Roy and Filmfare Award for Best Actor – Telugu for Dasara.

Nani expanded to production with D for Dopidi (2013). Nani launched his own production house Wall Poster Cinema in 2018, which has produced Awe (2018), HIT: The First Case (2020), HIT: The Second Case (2022), and Court – State vs a Nobody (2025). In 2018, Nani featured as the host of the Bigg Boss Telugu 2. Nani has also been recognized for supporting emerging filmmakers in Telugu cinema.

== Early life and family ==
Nani was born on 24 February 1984 in a Telugu Hindu family and was brought up in Hyderabad. His family hails from Challapalli, Andhra Pradesh. Nani did his schooling from St. Alphonsa's High School, Hyderabad, and then did his intermediate from Narayana Junior College, S. R. Nagar before graduating from Wesley Degree College, Secunderabad.

After a five years relationship, Nani married software engineer Anjana Yelavarthy on 27 October 2012, in Visakhapatnam. Their son Arjun, was born in 2017.

== Career ==
=== Career beginnings and struggle (2008–2010) ===
As an undergraduate, Nani got addicted to movies, citing Mani Ratnam as a major influence. He wanted to become a director; however, producer Anil Kumar Koneru allowed him to work on his production, Radha Gopalam (2005), as a "clap director", alongside director Bapu. He then worked for films including Allari Bullodu (2005), Astram (2006), and Dhee (2007). Nani took a break to work on a film script. Bhargavi Mallela, a friend of his, who was then working as a RJ for World Space Satellite, offered Nani work as an RJ. He accepted the offer and worked there for one year, hosting a program named "Non-Stop Nani".

Director Mohan Krishna Indraganti noticed Nani in an advertisement and offered him a role in the aforementioned film Ashta Chamma, also starring Swati Reddy. Ashta Chamma was well received by critics and Nani's performance was praised by them. Sify.com wrote "Nani has a very good screen presence. He has good emotions and dances well, though his body language sometimes reminds of Subhalekha Sudhakar – May this be treated as a compliment to the ease that the veteran actor shows on the screen! His addiction is good too." His second film, Ride, was produced by Bellamkonda Suresh, with Tanish, Swetha Basu Prasad and Aksha Pardasany playing important roles. Ride was also a notable success at the box office. He next starred in Satyam Bellamkonda's film Snehituda... opposite Maadhavi Latha. Snehituda... opened to negative reviews and the film was a flop at the box office. In 2010, he played the main role in the film Bheemili Kabaddi Jattu, a remake of Vennila Kabadi Kuzhu, with Saranya Mohan reprising her role as the heroine. The film opened to positive reviews with Nani's performance receiving appreciation. Rediff.com said Nani "perfectly fits into the role" and commended him for selecting the script, and One India commented that Nani "has given his best" and was "suited perfectly to the role". The film was a surprise hit at the box office.

=== Breakthrough and commercial fluctuations (2011–2014) ===
His first release in 2011, Ala Modalaindi, was a romantic comedy written and directed by Nandini Reddy, where he was cast opposite Nithya Menen. Nani's performance in the film received positive reviews, with critics noting that he was "completely natural" and "living [his] role". The film was a blockbuster at the box office. Simultaneously he did a Tamil film, Veppam, which marked his debut in Tamil cinema. Veppam received mixed reviews, but Nani was appreciated, The Times of India critic called his debut "confident", while Sify called his performance "riveting". It was dubbed into Telugu as Sega. Both versions were box-office failures. Nani's final release of the year was Pilla Zamindar, which opened to mostly positive reviews from critics, and Nani's performance as a spoilt-brat-turned-leader was well appreciated. Radhika Rajamani stated "It is Nani's show all the way. He lives up to the role and is able to portray the kaleidoscope of emotions demanded of him." IndiaGlitz wrote, "Performance-wise, Nani delivers a matured output in the second half as a youth in self-introspecting and self-correcting mode." The film was a hit at the box office, prompting a Tamil dubbed release under the title Jameen.

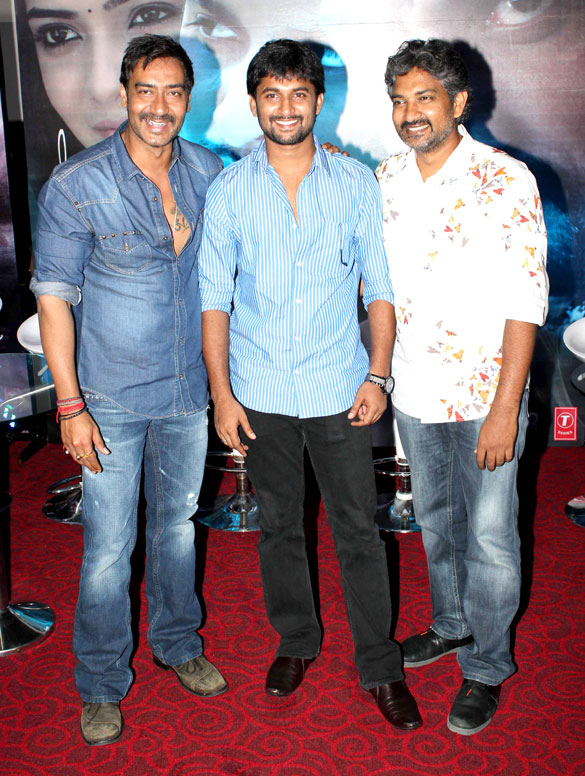
Ajay Devgan, Nani and Rajamouli during the special screening of Makkhi in 2012

Nani's first release of 2012 was S. S. Rajamouli's live action project Eega. Shot simultaneously in Tamil as Naan Ee, it featured him opposite Samantha Ruth Prabhu and opened to mostly positive response. Rajeev Masand opined that "Nani sizzles as the lover boy in the few scenes he is seen.", while other critics also added that he leaves a mark in the limited screen time. The film was one of the highest-grossing Telugu films of the year and was dubbed into Hindi as Makkhi and into Malayalam as Eecha. His other release that year was Gautham Vasudev Menon's Yeto Vellipoyindhi Manasu, where he played a college student reuniting with Samantha Ruth Prabhu. He also made a special appearance in its Tamil version, Neethane En Ponvasantham, where Jiiva replaced him. His portrayal of Varun Krishna was highly appreciated by critics. Sangeetha Dundoo from The Hindu noted, "Nani rises to the occasion with a mature performance. He speaks volumes through his eyes and conveys Varun's thoughts through the smallest of mannerisms. The climax completely belongs to him." CNN-IBN found him to be "quintessentially natural". Though the film received mixed reviews from film critics, it had a positive response at the box office, and won Nani his first and only Nandi Award for Best Actor till date.

In 2014, Nani was first seen in Krishna Vamsi's Paisa. The film revolved around the power of money and its influence over everything in society. Nani played the role of Prakash, a Sherwani model who is obsessed with earning money. The film opened to negative reviews, yet Nani's performance was appreciated by critics. The Hindu critic noted that he "holds the film together" and proves his merit yet again. The film was a disaster at the box office. He next starred in Yash Raj Films' maiden south Indian production Aaha Kalyanam, the Tamil remake of the 2010 Hindi film Band Baaja Baaraat. The film received mixed to negative reviews, but Nani's performance as Shakti was well received. Sify called his performance "pitch-perfect" It again emerged a commercial failure.

=== Critical acclaim (2015–2016) ===
The year 2015 marked a turning point in Nani's career. Nani first played dual roles in the political thriller Janda Pai Kapiraju, alongside Amala Paul, which was simultaneously made in Tamil as Nimirndhu Nil with Jayam Ravi in Nani's role. This movie was a disaster at the box office. He then portrayed an IIM graduate in Yevade Subramanyam, which opened to positive response and was commercially successful. Reviewing the film, Hemanth Kumar termed it as one of his best and added, "Nani digs deep into his arsenal of talent to stay true to the character throughout the film." His final release of the year was Bhale Bhale Magadivoy. Nani played an absent-minded junior botanist opposite Lavanya Tripathi. The film was a blockbuster and went on to become the fourth-highest grossing Telugu film of all time at the United States box-office. N. Sethumadhavan of the Bangalore Mirror termed Nani "refreshing", "talent to watch" and praised his chemistry with Tripathi. Suresh Kavirayani of the Deccan Chronicle noted, "A complete Nani’s show, whether it’s humour, emotion or romance, Nani does it with ease." His performance earned him the Filmfare Critics Award for Best Actor – Telugu and he received his first Filmfare Award for Best Actor – Telugu nomination.

Post Bhale Bhale Mogadivoy, Nani earned more critical praise in 2016. His first release was Krishna Gaadi Veera Prema Gaadha, opposite Mehreen Pirzada. The film opened to positive response from critics, The Hans India said, "A truly stand out performance from Nani for sure, who plays to his strength and exudes a natural feel to his character on screen." It became Nani's biggest opener in India, beating the records of Bhale Bhale Magadivoy. In his next film, Nani played dual roles of a businessman and IIM graduate opposite Surbhi and Nivetha Thomas in Gentleman. Purnima Sriram of The New Indian Express termed it a "game-changer" for Nani and added, "Nani nailed both the roles. He has shouted out loud to the world that he can play any role flawlessly and effortlessly." It went onto become his third highest grosser after Eega and Bhale Bhale Magadivoy. The film won him the Nandi Special Jury Award and his second Filmfare Best Actor – Telugu nomination. After playing Regina Cassandra's boyfriend in Jyo Achyutananda, Nani played an assistant director alongside Anu Emmanuel in Majnu, his last film that year. It was a commercial success.

=== Established actor (2017–2020) ===
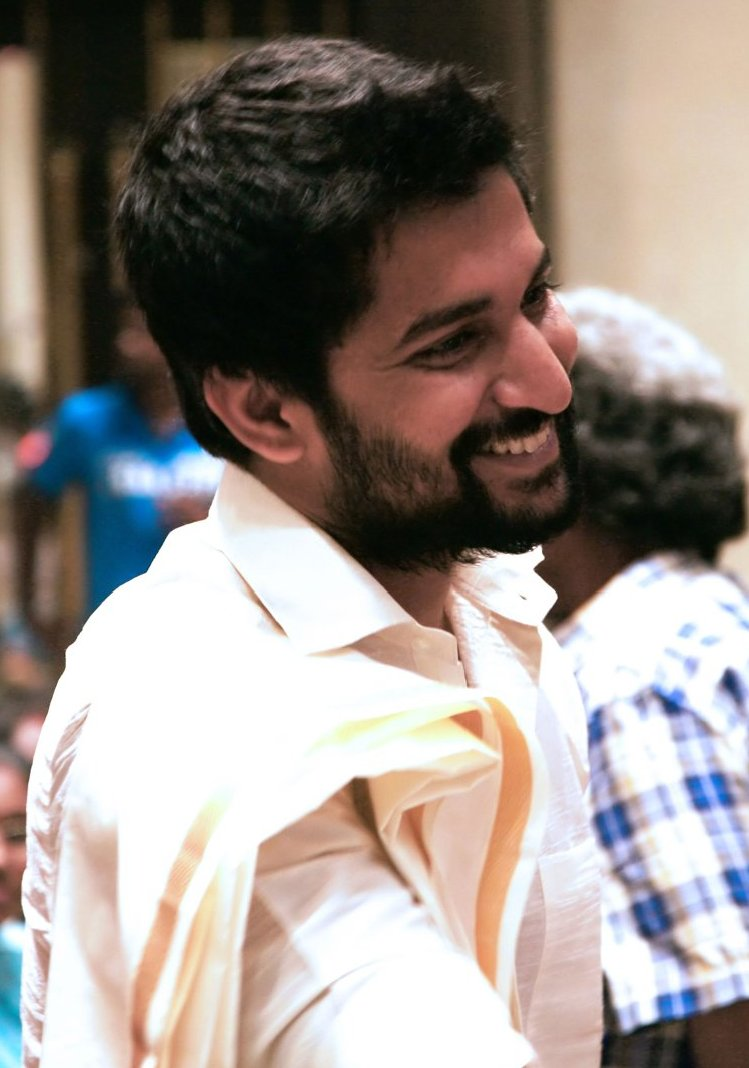
Nani at an event

Nani further established himself with commercial successes in 2017. Nenu Local, directed by Trinadha Rao Nakkina, was Nani's first release of the year, where he appeared opposite Keerthy Suresh. Idlebrain was appreciative of his performance and added that he carries the film "single handedly". The film became Nani's highest-grossing film to date. Nani played a doctor, in Ninnu Kori reuniting with Nivetha Thomas. While, a critic of Firstpost stated, "Nani is terrific. Although he has a funny side, there’s plenty of emotional weight that he carries throughout the film.", Priyanka Sundar of The Indian Express found him to be "repetitive". A commercial success, it became his second-highest-grosser after Nenu Local. Later the year, he played a boy with eidetic memory in Middle Class Abbayi, opposite Sai Pallavi. The film became a major commercial success, breaking Nenu Local's record to become his highest-grossing release.

In his first film of 2018, Nani played dual roles in Krishnarjuna Yudham, opposite Anupama Parameswaran and Rukshar Dhillon. The film was his first box office failure after eight consecutive successes. Nani again played a doctor in Devadas, where he appeared alongside Nagarjuna, Aakanksha Singh and Rashmika Mandanna. The film became a box office average, due to its big budget. Krishna Sripada of The Indian Express noted, "Nani gets into the skin of the character and gives his best to the make the lousy writing tolerable." In 2018, Nani also turned narrator for the films, Amoli and Ee Maaya Peremito.

Nani's first release in 2019 was Jersey, opposite Shraddha Srinath, where he played a former cricketer who restart cricket for his son. A critical and commercial success, it is considered as the most important film of his career and was listed as one of the "Best Telugu films of 2019". Haricharan Pudipeddi of Hindustan Times noted, "Nani is terrific as Arjun and he hasn’t looked so comfortable in role in a while." Janani K of India Today stated, "Nani's expressions are pitch-perfect for Jersey. He plays the role of an attacking right-hand batsman and Nani's cricketing technique is top-notch." It won him the SIIMA Critics Award for Best Actor – Telugu. Nani then played a crime novelist in Nani's Gang Leader. It received mixed reviews but became a box-office success. Times of India's Suhas Yellapantula called him the film's "heart and soul" and added that he brings the film "to life".

Nani's only release in 2020 was his 25th film, V, where he played a serial killer opposite Aditi Rao Hydari. The film was Nani's first OTT release (it was released on Amazon Prime Video), and was also his first negative character. Despite receiving mixed reviews, it became the most watched Telugu film on a streaming platform. Sowmya Rajendran of The News Minute opined, "Nani definitely makes a difference when he steps in. He's effortlessly funny, spooking people around him with his dark humour. But you do question his actions post the truth reveal."

=== Commercial success and stardom (2021–present) ===
In 2021, Nani first appeared as a revenue officer in Tuck Jagadish, alongside Ritu Varma. It was his second OTT release, after V and received negative reviews from critics, with his performance earning mixed reviews. In the same year, Nani played dual roles of a Bengali writer and his reincarnation, an aspiring filmmaker in Shyam Singha Roy, opposite Sai Pallavi and Krithi Shetty. It proved to be a major commercial success. Sankeertana Varma of Firstpost found him to be "impressive" and added, "Nani is especially great in scenes where he is slowly moving away from Vasu and embarrassing his inner Shyam". The film won him another Filmfare Critics Award for Best Actor – Telugu and his third Filmfare Best Actor – Telugu nomination.

Nani played Sundar, a Brahmin boy in love with a Christian girl, opposite Nazriya Nazim, in his first release of 2022, Ante Sundaraniki. The film was an average at domestic box-office, but became one of the highest-grossing releases of the year worldwide. Murali Krishna CH of Cinema Express stated, "Nani stay sincere and committed to his character. Nani serves up a reminder of how funny he can be in a role that he would perfectly fit into." Later the year, he appeared as Arjun Sarkaar IPS in HIT: The Second Case, revealing himself as the lead of HIT: The Third Case.

In his first release of 2023, Nani played a young ruffian who steals coal in Dasara, reuniting with Keerthy Suresh. Dasara became the highest-grossing film of Nani's career, leaving behind all his previous films. Chirag Sehgal of News18 noted, "Nani is amazing in what he does. He is a treat to watch and plays his part with utmost ease and perfection. But, his less screen time in the first half is a little disappointing." In his next film Hi Nanna, Nani played a fashion photographer and single father opposite Mrunal Thakur. While, Neeshita Nyayapati of Hindustan Times found him to be "flawless", Raghu Bandi of The Indian Express termed him "impressive". The film became a commercial success worldwide. Both these films earned Nani nominations for Filmfare Best Actor – Telugu, and he won his first Filmfare Best Actor for Dasara.

In his only release of 2024, Nani played a vigilante who fights against injustice in Saripodhaa Sanivaaram, opposite Priyanka Mohan. Sangeetha Devi Dundoo was appreciative of his "calibrated performance" and "simmering, controlled rage". The film turned another box office success for him. In 2025, Nani played an IPS officer in HIT: The Third Case opposite Srinidhi Shetty. Ganesh Aaglave was appreciative of his performance and took note of his suave charm, swag and charisma. The film became a box office success and the highest grossing film in the franchise. Some commentators took note of his consecutive successes and credited him for his "content-first choices and genre versatility".

In 2026, Nani played leader of a marginalised tribe in 1980s Secunderabad in The Paradise, opposite Kayadu Lohar. Chirag Sehgal of News18 called Nani film's biggest strength and praised his performance both physically and emotionally. The film became a modest success, despite being the biggest opening of his career. Nani will next appear in Bloody Romeo.

== Other ventures ==
=== Production ===
Nani turned producer for the film, D for Dopidi, in 2013. It was co-produced by director duo Raj Nidimoru and Krishna D.K.. It starred Sundeep Kishan, Varun Sandesh, Rakesh Rachakonda, and Naveen Polishetty. He also lent his voice to the film. The film was a moderate success at the box office. He launched his film production house, Wall Poster Cinema, along with costume designer, Prashanti Tipirneni, as a partner. The first film in the banner was Awe or "అ!" (2018). It was one of the most critically acclaimed films of the year and won 2 awards, at the 66th National Film Awards, for Best Special Effects and Best Make-Up Artist.

In 2020, Nani produced the crime thriller, HIT: The First Case, with Vishwak Sen and Ruhani Sharma. It was one of the bigger sleeper hits of the year, right before the COVID-19 pandemic occurred worldwide, in March 2020. He has since produced its sequel, HIT: The Second Case (2022), with Adivi Sesh and Meenakshi Chaudhary, and the web series Meet Cute (2022), which stars an ensemble cast. In 2025, Nani produced two films: Court – State vs. A Nobody and HIT: The Third Case, in which he also co-stars with Srinidhi Shetty. Nani's next untitled production will star Chiranjeevi as the lead.

=== Television ===
Nani hosted the 2nd IIFA Utsavam in 2017, which was held in Hyderabad. He hosted the event along with Rana Daggubati. In 2018, Nani hosted the second season of Bigg Boss Telugu, the Telugu version of Indian reality show Bigg Boss. He has appeared as a guest in the second and fourth season of Meelo Evaru Koteeswarudu.

=== Voice artist ===
Nani has also worked as a voice artist. In 2015, he dubbed for Dulquer Salmaan's role in the Telugu version of O Kadhal Kanmani, titled OK Bangaram. In 2018, he voiced for a fish in his production, Awe. In the 2019 film Jersey, Nani dubbed for Harish Kalyan. In the Telugu version of The Lion King, released in 2019, Nani dubbed for Simba.

== Philanthropy ==
Apart from his acting career, Nani is a philanthropist. Nani donated a huge sum during the 2015 South India floods to people affected by it. In 2020, during the COVID-19 pandemic, he donated a sum of ₹30 lakhs to the Corona Virus Charity Fund. That same year, he organised a campaign with Cyberabad Police, urging people to donate their blood plasma for COVID patients. Nani donated his blood, to help children suffering from Thalassemia. He has been recognized as a social justice warrior, advocating for issues like farmer rights and civic responsibility.

== In the media ==
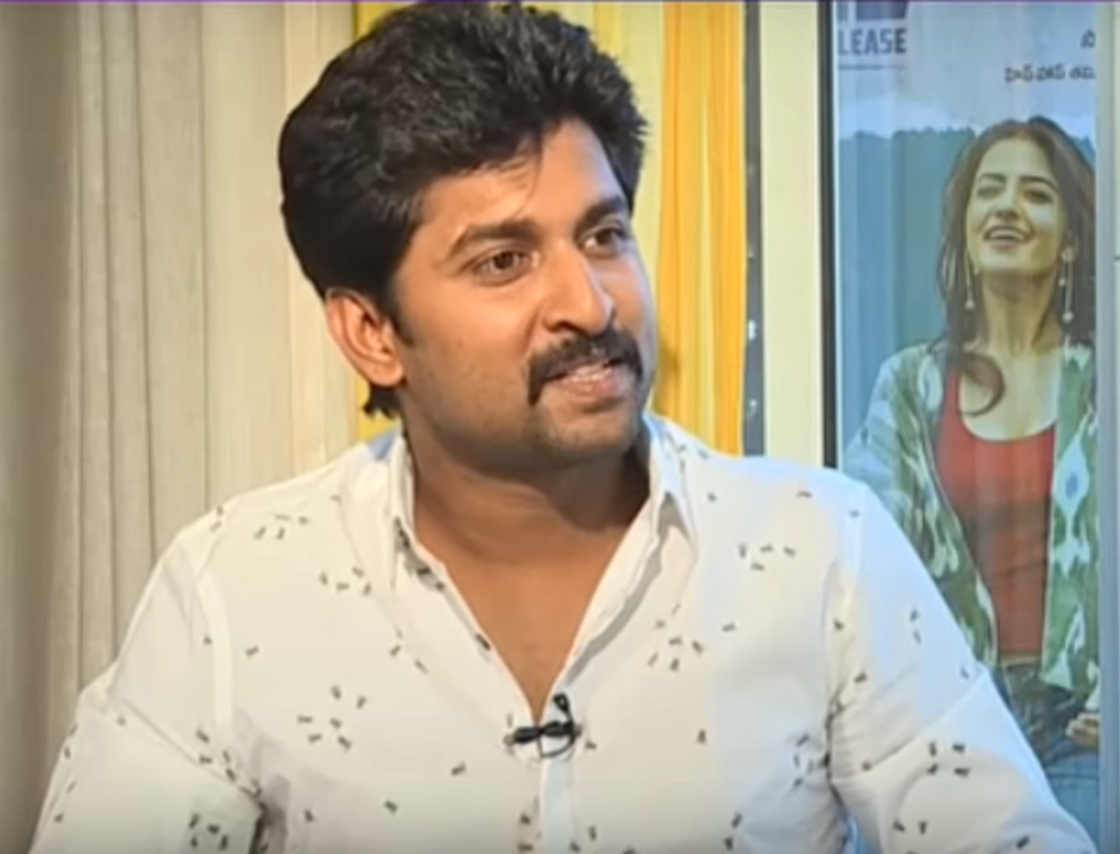
Nani at an interview in 2018

Nani is considered among the highest-paid and prominent Telugu actors. He is affectionately referred to as "Natural Star" by the audience for his realistic performances in a variety of roles. His performance in Jersey is regarded as one of the "100 Greatest Performances of the Decade" by Film Companion. In Rediff.com's "Top Telugu Actors" list, Nani was placed 4th in 2011 and 3rd in 2012. Nani stood at the 19th place on its most influential stars on Instagram in South cinema for the year 2021 list. In the Hyderabad Times Most Desirable Men list, he was placed 18th in 2013, 8th in 2015, 3rd in 2016, 10th in 2017, 27th in 2019 and 26th in 2020. In 2024, The Hollywood Reporter India placed him in its "Top 10 Telugu Performers" list. Nani is a prominent celebrity endorser for several brands and products such as Otto, Sprite, Minute Maid, Close–Up and Aashirvaad Masalas'.

== Accolades ==
Nani is a recipient of three Filmfare Awards South — Best Actor Critics – Telugu for Bhale Bhale Magadivoy and Shyam Singha Roy and Best Actor – Telugu for Dasara (2023). Additionally, he won two Nandi Awards — Best Actor for Yeto Vellipoyindhi Manasu and Special Jury Award for Gentleman.
