= List of awards and nominations received by Nani =

Nani awards and nominations
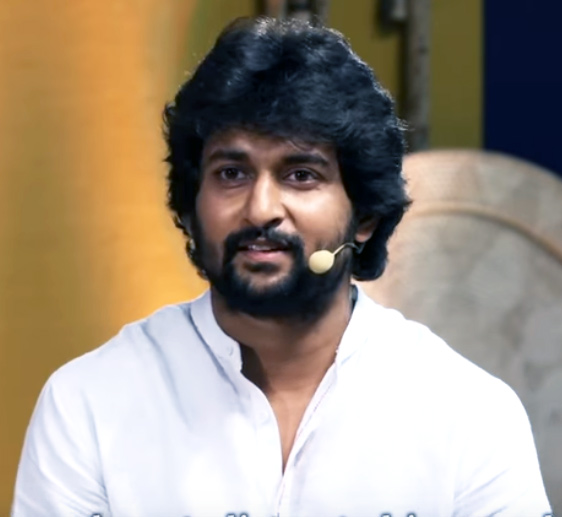
- Nani in 2018
Awards and nominations
Award	Wins	Nominations
Filmfare Awards South	3	7
Nandi Awards	2	2
South Indian International Movie Awards	4	10
IIFA Utsavam	1	4
Zee Cine Awards Telugu	4	6

Totals (Note: Certain award groups do not simply award one winner. They acknowledge several different recipients, have runners-up, and have third place. Since this is a specific recognition and is different from losing an award, runner-up mentions are considered wins in this award tally. For simplification and to avoid errors, each award in this list has been presumed to have had a prior nomination.)
- Wins: 19
- Nominations: 37

Ghanta Naveen Babu, professionally known as Nani, is an Indian actor, producer and television presenter who predominantly works in Telugu cinema. Nani is a recipient of three Filmfare Awards and two Nandi Awards. Nani won the Filmfare Critics Award for Best Actor – Telugu for Bhale Bhale Magadivoy (2015) and Shyam Singha Roy (2021), being the only Telugu actor to win it twice. He has also won Filmfare Award for Best Actor – Telugu for Dasara (2023). Additionally, he won two Nandi Awards — Best Actor for Yeto Vellipoyindhi Manasu (2012) and Special Jury Award for Gentleman (2016).

== CineMAA Awards ==
Nani has received one CineMAA Awards nominations.

Year	Category	Film	Result	Ref.
2016	Best Actor	Bhale Bhale Magadivoy	Nominated	

== Critics' Choice Film Awards ==
Nani has won one Critics' Choice Film Awards.

Year	Category	Film	Result	Ref.
2020	Best Actor – Male	Jersey	Won	

== Filmfare Awards South ==
Nani has won three Filmfare Awards South from five nominations.

Year	Category	Film	Result	Ref.
2016	Best Actor – Telugu	Bhale Bhale Magadivoy	Nominated	
2016	Critics Best Actor – Telugu	Bhale Bhale Magadivoy	Won	
2017	Best Actor – Telugu	Gentleman	Nominated	
2022	Best Actor – Telugu	Shyam Singha Roy	Nominated	
2022	Best Actor Critics – Telugu	Shyam Singha Roy	Won	
2024	Best Actor – Telugu	Dasara	Won	
2024	Best Actor – Telugu	Hi Nanna	Nominated	

== Hyderabad Times Film Awards ==
Nani has received one Hyderabad Times Film Awards nomination.

Year	Category	Film	Result	Ref.
2012	Best Actor – Male	Ala Modalaindi	Nominated	

== IIFA Utsavam ==
Nani has received one IIFA Utsavam award from four nominations.

Year	Category	Film	Result	Ref.
2016	Best Actor – Telugu	Bhale Bhale Magadivoy	Nominated	
2017	Best Actor – Telugu	Krishna Gaadi Veera Prema Gaadha	Nominated	
2024	Best Actor – Telugu	Dasara	Won	
2024	Best Actor – Telugu	Hi Nanna	Nominated	

== Nandi Awards ==
Nani has won two Nandi Awards.

Year	Category	Film	Result	Ref.
2012	Best Actor	Yeto Vellipoyindhi Manasu	Won	
2016	Special Jury Award	Gentleman	Won	

== South Indian International Movie Awards ==
Nani has won four South Indian International Movie Awards from ten nomination.

Year	Category	Film	Result	Ref.
2012	Best Male Debut – Tamil	Veppam	Nominated	
2012	Rising Male Star of South Indian Cinema	—N/a	Won	
2016	Best Actor – Telugu	Bhale Bhale Magadivoy	Nominated	
2017	Best Actor – Telugu	Krishna Gadi Veera Prema Gaadha	Nominated	
2021	Best Actor – Telugu	Jersey	Nominated	
2021	Best Actor Critics – Telugu	Jersey	Won	
2021	Entertainer of the Year	Jersey & Nani's Gang Leader	Won	
2021	Best Actor in a Negative Role – Telugu	V	Nominated	
2022	Best Actor – Telugu	Shyam Singha Roy	Nominated	
2024	Best Actor – Telugu	Dasara	Won	
2025	Best Actor – Telugu	Saripodhaa Sanivaaram	Nominated	

== Toronto After Dark Film Festival ==
Nani has won two Toronto After Dark Film Festival awards.

Year	Category	Film	Result	Ref.
2013	Best Hero	Eega	Won	
2013	Best Fight	Eega	Won	

== TSR– TV9 National Film Awards ==
Nani has won one TSR– TV9 National Film Awards.

Year	Category	Film	Result	Ref.
2017	Best Actor – Popular Choice	Gentleman	Won	

== Vijay Awards ==
Nani has won one Vijay Awards.

Year	Category	Film	Result	Ref.
2012	Best Debut Actor	Veppam	Won	

== Zee Cine Awards Telugu ==
Nani has won four Zee Cine Awards Telugu from six nominations.

Year	Category	Film	Result	Ref.
2017	Golden Star of the Year	Krishna Gaadi Veera Prema Gaadha	Won	
2017	Boy Next Door	Krishna Gaadi Veera Prema Gaadha	Won	
2018	Favorite Actor of the Year – Male	Nenu Local, Ninnu Kori & Middle Class Abbayi	Won	
2019	Favorite Actor of the Year – Male	Devadas	Nominated	
2020	Best Actor in Leading Role – Male	Jersey	Nominated	
2020	Favorite Actor of the Year – Male	Jersey	Won	

== Other recognitions ==
=== Media honours ===
Year	Honour	Magazine	Result	Ref.
2011	Best Telugu Actor	Rediff.com	#4	
2015	Best Telugu Actor	Rediff.com	#3	
2021	Most Influential Stars on Instagram in South cinema	Forbes India	#19	

=== Times of India ===
Year	Category	Result	Ref.
2013	Hyderabad Times Most Desirable Men	#18	
2015	Hyderabad Times Most Desirable Men	#8	
2016	Hyderabad Times Most Desirable Men	#3	
2017	Hyderabad Times Most Desirable Men	#10	
2019	Hyderabad Times Most Desirable Men	#27	
2020	Hyderabad Times Most Desirable Men	#26	
