= HIT: The First Case (2022 film) =

2022 film directed by Sailesh Kolanu

- Theatrical release poster
- Directed by: Sailesh Kolanu
- Screenplay by: Sailesh Kolanu
- Story by: Sailesh Kolanu
- Based on: HIT: The First Case (Telugu) by Sailesh Kolanu
- Produced by: Bhushan Kumar; Krishan Kumar; Dil Raju; Kuldeep Rathore
- Starring: Rajkummar Rao; Sanya Malhotra
- Cinematography: S. Manikandan
- Edited by: Garry BH
- Music by: Songs: Mithoon; Manan Bhardwaj; Background Score: John Stewart Eduri
- Production companies: T-Series Films; Dil Raju Production
- Distributed by: PVR Pictures
- Release date: 15 July 2022
- Running time: 133 minutes
- Country: India
- Language: Hindi
- Budget: ₹30 crore
- Box office: est. ₹11.78 crore

HIT: The First Case (Note: HIT is the abbreviation of Homicide Intervention Team.) is a 2022 Indian Hindi-language thriller film written and directed by Sailesh Kolanu, being a remake of his 2020 Telugu film of the same name. The film is produced by Dil Raju Production and T-Series. It stars Rajkummar Rao and Sanya Malhotra. The film was released on 15 July 2022. It received mixed to positive reviews but underperformed at the box office.

== Plot ==
Vicky, a sharp but troubled cop in the Homicide Intervention Team (HIT), grapples with PTSD while investigating the disappearance of Preeti, a young woman whose car broke down on a highway. The case becomes intertwined with the disappearance of his colleague and romantic interest, Neha, raising suspicions about his own involvement.

Vicky's investigation reveals Preeti was adopted, had a strained relationship with her neighbor Sheela, and was secretly dating Ajay. Forensic evidence links multiple people to Preeti's death, including her father, the orphanage head, and an unknown DNA sample, complicating the investigation. Meanwhile, witness accounts and toll booth footage point to a lorry and Fahad, Ibrahim's mechanic, as potential leads.

The investigation takes a dark turn when Ibrahim is killed in pursuit of Fahad, who leads them to a hideout. There, Rohit, Vicky's close friend and colleague, is revealed to be protecting his wife, Sapna. Sapna, who worked with Rohit, had a disturbing past with Preeti. They both grew up in the same orphanage, where Sapna developed an obsessive infatuation with Preeti. Saraswati, the head of the orphanage, separated them. Years later, a chance encounter at a club reignites Sapna's obsession. Preeti's rejection triggers a violent reaction, leading Sapna to kidnap her with Fahad's help. A struggle ensues, resulting in Preeti's accidental death.

Rohit, trying to shield Sapna, helps bury Preeti's body. Sapna confesses to her crimes and is arrested. Neha, shaken by the case, seeks to understand Vicky's own trauma. He experiences flashbacks of a girl being burned alive, hinting at a dark event from his past. The film concludes with a near-fatal shooting, leaving Vicky and Neha's future uncertain and setting the stage for a potential sequel exploring the unresolved mysteries of Vicky's past.

== Cast ==
- Rajkummar Rao as DCP Vikram Jaisingh IPS (Vicky), Neha's love interest
- Sanya Malhotra as Dr. Neha Mehta, Vikram's love interest
- Akhil Iyer as Rohit Shukla, Vikram's colleague
- Shilpa Shukla as Sheela
- Dalip Tahil as Ajit Singh Shekhawat, Vikram's senior officer
- Sanjay Narvekar as Shrikant Saxena
- Milind Gunaji as SI Ibrahim Sheikh
- Shikha Pareek as Laxmi Mathur
- Hemraj Tiwari as Mohan Mathur
- Jatin Goswami as Akshay
- Rose Khan as Preeti Mathur
- Raviraj as Fahaad
- Madhur Arora as Anirudh
- Dishita Sehgal as Young Preeti
- Nuveksha as Sapna Shukla, Rohit's wife & Preeti's obsessed lover
- Kirti Kapoor as Geetha
- Karan Mehta as Shiva
- Noyrika Bhatheja as Dr Ritika
- Chinmaya Madan as Ajay Preeti's boyfriend
- Bhairavi Raichura as Sushmita (Sushmi)

== Production ==
Principal photography commenced on 12 September 2021 and wrapped up on 18 April 2022.

== Soundtrack ==
Hit - The First Case

Soundtrack album by Mithoon and Manan Bhardwaj
- Released: 26 July 2022
- Recorded: 2021–2022
- Genre: Feature film soundtrack
- Length: 11:39
- Language: Hindi
- Label: T-Series

Official audio
- Hit - The First Case - Full Album on YouTube

The music of the film is composed by Mithoon and Manan Bhardwaj while the lyrics are written by Sayeed Quadri and Manan Bhardwaj. The film score is composed by John Stewart Eduri. The first single was released on 29 June 2022.

Track listing
No.	Title	Lyrics	Music	Singer(s)	Length
1.	"Kitni Haseen Hogi"	Sayeed Quadri	Mithoon	Arijit Singh	3:49
2.	"Tinka"	Manan Bhardwaj	Manan Bhardwaj	Jubin Nautiyal	3:36
3.	"Kahani Baaki Hai"	Manan Bhardwaj	Manan Bhardwaj	Divya Kumar	2:51
Total length:					11:39

== Reception ==
=== Box office ===
HIT: The First Case earned ₹1.35 crore at the domestic box office on its opening day and ₹5.59 crore on opening weekend.

As of 18 July 2022, the film grossed ₹11.06 crore (US$1.2 million) in India and ₹0.72 crore (US$77,000) overseas, for a worldwide gross collection of ₹11.78 crore (US$1.3 million).

=== Critical response ===
HIT: The First Case received mostly positive reviews from critics with praise towards the performances of Rao and Malhotra, pacing and direction. On the review aggregator website Rotten Tomatoes, 50% of 10 critics' reviews are positive, with an average rating of 4.6/10.

Chirag Sehgal of News 18 rated the film 3.5 out of 5 stars and wrote, "Rajkummar Rao shines bright in the movie. The film also looks very similar to Kunal Kemmu's web series Abhay." A critic for Bollywood Hungama rated the film 3 out of 5 stars and wrote, "HIT THE FIRST CASE is a decent watch thanks to a superlative performance, whodunit element and a story." Shubham Kulkarni of Tushar Joshi of India Today rated the film 3 out of 5 stars and wrote, "If you are looking for a solid performance from Rajkummar Rao, then HIT won't disappoint. It is gripping in parts but we hoped the writers had put in more efforts to go beyond just remaking another south film." Renuka Vyavahare of The Times of India rated the film 3 out of 5 stars and wrote, "Rajkummar Rao lends gravitas to the dawdling crime mystery. He has the ability to elevate a scrambled script and he does that here as well. He ensures you are on his team despite the misfires. HIT is more of a hit-and-miss." Sukanya Verma of Rediff.com rated the film 3 out of 5 stars and wrote, "HIT: The First Case hits the jackpot with Rajkummar Rao. Nothing escapes his discerning eye. Nothing comes in our way of admiring it." Devesh Sharma of Filmfare rated the film 3 out of 5 stars and wrote, "Rajkumar Rao is the best thing about the film and keeps you invested in the project through sheer dint of effort." A critic for Pinkvilla rated the film 3 out of 5 stars and wrote, "HIT: The First Case hits the bulls eye in the first half, but falls flat in the second. It's an honest attempt to bring the thriller for the Hindi audience."

=== Home media ===
The film started streaming on Netflix from 28 August 2022.
