= Garry BH =

Indian film editor

- Born: Visakhapatnam, Andhra Pradesh, India
- Occupation: Editor
- Years active: 2016–present

Garry BH is an Indian film editor who works in Telugu cinema. He has worked as an editor for more than twenty films.

== Career ==
His friend, Ravikanth Perepu, who was directing Kshanam (2016), offered him to work on the production team. Abburi Ravi mentored Garry on the narrative styles of films and perspectives. For the film, he was part of several departments including direction, photography and editing. He worked as an additional editor for Ghazi (2017). Garry went on to work on several notable films including Goodachari (2018), Evaru (2019), Aswathama (2020), and HIT: The First Case (2020).

He is made his directorial debut with Spy, starring Nikhil Siddhartha.

== Filmography ==
- All films are in Telugu language unless otherwise noted.

As editor

Year	Film	Notes
2016	Kshanam	Assistant director and actor
2016	Raagam	Short film
2017	The Ghazi Attack	Additional editor (also made in Hindi)
2018	Goodachari	Feature film debut
2018	Idam Jagath	
2018	My Dear Marthandam	
2019	Mithai	
2019	Jessie	
2019	Evaru	
2019	Rama Chakkani Seetha	
2019	Operation Gold Fish	Also producer
2019	Athaha	Short film
2019	Heza	
2020	Aswathama	
2020	HIT: The First Case	
2020	College Kumar	
2020	Eureka	
2020	Krishna and His Leela	
2021	Paagal	
2021	Ichata Vahanamulu Niluparadu	
2021	Adbhutham	
2022	Virgin Story	
2022	Case 30	
2022	Shekar	
2022	HIT: The First Case	
2022	Dongalunnaru Jaagratha	
2022	Ori Devuda	
2022	Thaggedele	
2022	Meet Cute	Web series on SonyLIV
2022	HIT: The Second Case	
2022	Panchathantram	
2022	S5 No Exit	
2023	Error 500	
2023	Spy	Also directorial debut
2023	Prem Kumar	
2024	Saindhav	
2024	Bhoothaddam Bhaskar Narayana	
2024	Anthima Theerpu	
2025	28 Degree Celsius	
2025	Sasivadane	
