= HIT: The First Case =

2020 film directed by Sailesh Kolanu

- Theatrical release poster
- Directed by: Sailesh Kolanu
- Written by: Sailesh Kolanu
- Produced by: Prashanti Tipirneni
- Starring: Vishwak Sen; Ruhani Sharma
- Cinematography: S. Manikandan
- Edited by: Garry BH
- Music by: Vivek Sagar
- Production company: Wall Poster Cinema
- Release date: 28 February 2020
- Running time: 130 minutes
- Country: India
- Language: Telugu
- Box office: ₹12.60 crore

HIT: The First Case (Note: HIT is the abbreviation of Homicide Intervention Team.) is a 2020 Indian Telugu-language crime thriller film written and directed by debutant Sailesh Kolanu. Produced by Wall Poster Cinema, it is the first film in the HIT film series. The film stars Vishwak Sen and Ruhani Sharma. In the film, a police officer in the Telangana state's Homicide Intervention Team (HIT) is tasked with investigating the case of an 18-year old missing girl.

The First Case was released theatrically on 28 February 2020 to positive reviews from audience and critics, and became a commercial success at the box office. Sailesh Kolanu also helmed the Hindi remake of the film with the same title, and was released on 15 June 2022. Later, two standalone sequels of the original film called HIT: The Second Case and HIT: The Third Case, were released respectively in 2022 and 2025. The films collectively form the HIT Universe.

== Plot ==
Vikram Rudraraju is a nimble cop working in Homicide Intervention Team (HIT), a branch of CID, of Telangana. He suffers from frequent PTSD episodes and conceals his tragic past from his girlfriend Neha, a Forensic investigator. He refuses to take drugs as he believes that they slow down his competencies but takes a sabbatical to recuperate on Neha's insistence. Meanwhile, Preethi, a college student, stalls on ORR as her car malfunctions. Ibrahim, a commuting police officer, offers help and she uses his mobile to inform her father of the events; Ibrahim promptly leaves and later spots Preethi getting into a blue car, which he presumes to be that of her father. Preethi's father Mohan reports that she is missing and the blue car was not his; he reproaches Ibrahim for his laxity but the latter rebuts. Mohan and his wife Lakshmi reach out to Vishwanath, their family friend and Vikram's boss, who suspends Ibrahim and doubts his alibi.

After two months, Vikram learns that Neha went missing and his arch-nemesis Abhilash is handling the case. He requests Vishwanath to be assigned the case but he refuses and emphasizes that he will take it personally. Vikram and his colleague Rohit ask Neha's colleague Shinde for details about the cases Neha has been handling for past three months; Vikram notes similarities between the missing of Neha and that of Preethi and approaches Vishwanath to be instead allotted with Preethi's missing case. While Abhilash strongly believes that Vikram is behind Neha's disappearance, Vikram and Rohit go to Preethi's college and meet her best friends Ajay and Sandhya, who reveal that they clubbed a night before Preethi went missing. They further deduce that Preethi was an orphan raised in the orphanage run by Saraswati and that she was adopted by Mohan's brother Shiva and the latter's wife Priya. After the duo died in an accident, Mohan and Lakshmi reared her. Sheela, a socially-ostracized divorcee and Preethi's neighbour, finds a note stating that a dead body, apparently that of Preethi, is behind a guest house. Vikram infers that Sheela wrote the note herself and owns a blue car; she is subsequently apprehended and interrogated. Though she affirms that she forged the note to gain attention, Vikram disbelieves her and excavates the ground behind the guest house.

The cops discover an unrecognizable putrid corpse in the ground and realize that it is of Preethi. The case goes nowhere as the forensic officers reveal that the traces of DNA of Ajay, Mohan and Saraswati were found on the corpse. When Ajay goes missing, Vikram suspects him but realizes that Preethi was his girlfriend and that he left to mourn her death. Vikram later receives a call from a woman Latha, who reports being threatened by a person on the ORR to get off her car and relates to the events leading to Preethi's missing. Vikram begins his investigation from the local tollbooth and deduces that a common lorry, driven by a common person, passed the tollbooth on both the days and realizes that the blue car was also transported in the lorry, explaining why it was not caught in the CCTV cameras. He recognizes the driver to be mechanic Fahad, an acquaintance of Ibrahim. Ibrahim leads Vikram to Fahad's residence, where Fahad fires at them and kills Ibrahim while Abhilash intervenes and rescues Vikram. Both of them subdue Fahad, who reveals that he received a contract to abduct Preethi and Neha while kidnapping Latha was his personal interest to gain ransom and takes them to the perpetrator's residence. Vikram barges into the bungalow and finds Rohit; the latter tries to shoot Vikram but gets shot instead and dies. His wife Swapna mourns his death and admits to being the mastermind while Abhilash finds Neha tied and gagged upstairs.

As Neha and Vikram reunite, Swapna reveals that she was raised by Saraswati in her orphanage along with her younger sister Alekhya and Preethi. When Shiva and Priya arrived at an orphanage, seeking to adopt one of the girls, Swapna pleaded with Preethi to let Alekhya be adopted so that she could receive treatment for her heart disease. Preethi feigned compliance but chose to be adopted by the couple and Alekhya tragically died due to the disease on her birthday. Swapna grew depressed and furious with Preethi for her selfish conduct, which resurfaced after she met her at a pub a few days before her disappearance. She got her abducted and brutally killed her; Rohit, who was unaware of all the preceding events, found Swapna with Preethi's corpse and buried it to protect his wife. They abducted Neha after she nearly found them but planned to sedate and untie her before illegally immigrating abroad; Rohit relocated the corpse to the place where Sheela created that it would be and planted the traces of DNA he collected from Ajay, Mohan and Saraswati to mislead the investigation and let the case go cold.

Vikram finds a note left by Rohit and realizes that the gun he was holding had no bullets and that he purposely aimed it at Vikram to get shot and killed, completely sure that he would crack the case. While it is revealed that Vikram's sister Sushmita alias Sushmi was stalked and immolated in front of Vikram, the latter refuses to disclose further details about his past to Neha. Subsequently, Vikram falls prey to an unsuccessful assassination attempt, hinting a sequel.

== Cast ==
- Vishwak Sen as SP Vikram Rudraraju IPS
- Ruhani Sharma as Neha
- Chaitanya Sagiraju as Rohit
- Brahmaji as R. Shinde
- Hari Teja as Sheela
- Murali Sharma as Ibrahim Shaikh
- Bhanu Chander as DG Vishwanath IPS
- Kalpika Ganesh as Dr. Roopa
- Naveena Reddy as Swapna
  - Dhanvi as Young Swapna
- Ravi Raja as Fahad
- Sahiti Avancha as Preethi
  - Vanshi Kakkar as Young Preethi
- Ravi Varma as Srinivas
- Maganti Srinath as SP Abhilash IPS
- Rangadham as Mohan
- Roopa Lakshmi as Lakshmi
- Rajeshwari as Latha
- Kalpa Latha as Saraswati
- Trish as Ajay
- Jaiyetri as Sandya
- Satya Krishnan as Priya
- Sri Harsha as Shiva
- Sanjana Reddy Malla as Doctor Garu

== Production ==
On 24 October 2019, the film's ceremonial pooja was held and production for the film commenced. Nani and Prashanti Tipirneni produced the film under "Wall Poster Cinema" banner. This film is their second venture after Awe. A teaser was launched on 1 January 2020. The film's title is an acronym for "Homicide Intervention Team".

== Soundtrack ==
HIT: The First Case

Soundtrack album by Vivek Sagar
- Released: 2020
- Recorded: 2020
- Genre: Feature film soundtrack
- Label: Sony Music India
- Producer: Vivek Sagar

Vivek Sagar chronology
| Brochevarevarura (2019) | HIT: The First Case (2020) | Raja Raja Chora (2021) |

The songs were composed by Vivek Sagar. The singles "Poraatame" and "Ventaade Gaayam" were released on 25 and 26 February, respectively.

All lyrics are written by Krishna Kanth.

| No. | Title | Artist(s) | Length |
|---|---|---|---|
| 1. | "Poraatame" | David Simon | 4:14 |
| 2. | "Ventaade Gaayam" | Mohana Bhogaraju | 3:32 |
| Total length: | | | 7:46 |

== Home media ==
The movie was released on Amazon Prime Video on 1 April 2020, while the satellite rights were purchased by Gemini TV.

== Critical reception ==
The Hindu gave the film a positive review praising the screenplay and the performances of the cast. The Deccan Chronicle gave the film three out of five stars and wrote that "Vishwak Sen’s brilliant performance and Vivek Sagar’s background music mark this film". Hemanth Kumar of Firstpost rated the film 3.25 stars out of 5, saying,"If you love crime dramas, HIT is a thrilling experience, which falters a bit in the end." Janani K of India Today said, "Director Sailesh Kolanu's HIT is a brilliant investigation thriller that will blow your mind right from the beginning." Neeshita Nyayapati of The Times of India said, "HIT is definitely not a film that will keep you on the edge of the seat, but it keeps you engaged enough to know more." Baradwaj Rangan of Film Companion South wrote "In this whodunit, directed by Sailesh Kolanu, the sophistication in filmmaking is matched by a sophisticated worldview. But it needed a better closing stretch."

== Remake ==
Kolanu also directed the film's Hindi remake with the same name starring Rajkummar Rao and Sanya Malhotra. It released on 15 July 2022.

== Sequel ==
In March 2021, the sequel was announced by Nani. Actor Adivi Sesh plays the lead Krishna Dev who is a police officer of the Andhra Pradesh HIT team. The sequel would not focus on what happened after The First Case, and starts as an original story, but has references and connections to the first part(as it is the part of universe). The film was originally scheduled for a theatrical release on 29 July 2022, but was delayed and instead released on 2 December 2022. A third HIT (The Third Case) movie was released on 1 May 2025 with Nani in the lead role.
