= HIT: The Third Case =

2025 film by Sailesh Kolanu

- Theatrical release poster
- Directed by: Sailesh Kolanu
- Written by: Sailesh Kolanu
- Produced by: Prashanti Tipirneni; Nani
- Starring: Nani; Srinidhi Shetty
- Cinematography: Sanu John Varghese
- Edited by: Karthika Srinivas
- Music by: Mickey J. Meyer
- Production companies: Wall Poster Cinema; Unanimous Productions
- Release date: 1 May 2025
- Running time: 157 minutes
- Country: India
- Language: Telugu
- Budget: ₹70 crore
- Box office: ₹120.58 crore

HIT: The Third Case (Note: HIT is the abbreviation of Homicide Intervention Team.) is a 2025 Indian Telugu-language neo-noir action thriller film written and directed by Sailesh Kolanu. Produced by Wall Poster Cinema and Unanimous Productions, it is the third installment in the HIT film series following HIT: The First Case (2020) and HIT: The Second Case (2022). The film stars Nani and Srinidhi Shetty (in her Telugu film debut). In the film, a ruthless police officer is sent by the Homicide Intervention Team (HIT) to find a group of killers and put an end to their grisly murder spree.

The Third Case was first teased in the credits of its predecessor, with Nani leading the cast. In February 2024, Nani's commitments went to Nani 32, directed by Sujeeth and produced by DVV Entertainment. However, due to delays with the director's They Call Him OG (2025) led to postponement with the start of its production. By September, Nani began prioritising The Third Case. Principal photography took place from September 2024 to March 2025 in Hyderabad, Visakhapatnam, Jaipur, Jammu & Kashmir, and Arunachal Pradesh. The film has music composed by Mickey J. Meyer, cinematography handled by Sanu Varghese and editing by Karthika Srinivas.

HIT: The Third Case was released worldwide on 1 May 2025 in theatres. The film received mixed reviews from critics. It emerged as the eight highest-grossing Telugu film of the year. A sequel, HIT: The Fourth Case, is announced.

== Plot ==
SP Arjun Sarkaar IPS, a formidable officer in the Homicide Intervention Team (HIT), is incarcerated after orchestrating a ruthless murder. In prison, a fellow inmate named Samuel Joseph rescues Arjun from a vengeful group of convicts he had previously arrested. Shortly after, Arjun narrates the circumstances behind his imprisonment to Joseph through a series of flashbacks.

Following Krishna Dev AKA KD's transfer to HIT Hyderabad, Arjun is posted as his replacement in HIT Visakhapatnam. Shortly after his arrival, he executes a civilian by slitting his jugular vein, records the act, and subsequently gets assigned to investigate his own crime. During the autopsy, it is discovered that the victim's endocrine glands were missing. Meanwhile, Arjun enters a romantic relationship with Mrudula, a woman he met through a matrimonial platform set up by his father. His subordinate, ASP Varsha, grows suspicious of his movements and tracks him down, witnessing him commit a second, identical murder. She attacks him, but Arjun overpowers her. When confronted, Arjun reveals that the victims were convicted pedophiles, and his actions are a part of an undercover operation to infiltrate a dark web cult known as "CTK" (Capture, Torture, Kill), which requires prospective members to upload two filmed murders to gain entry.

With authorization from ADGP Nageswara Rao IPS, Arjun leads a task force, including Varsha and Mrudula, revealed to be an undercover officer, to Naharlagun, Arunachal Pradesh, where CTK's annual meeting is scheduled to take place inside a secluded Burmese palace. Upon arrival, the syndicate's leader, Alpha, deploys decoys to misdirect police backup, but Arjun manages to transmit the hideout's location by attaching a radio beacon to his pet vulture. Inside, he witnesses horrific executions of hostages and is forced to compete in a fatal fight to prove his allegience.

When Alpha threatens a nine-month-old infant, Arjun breaks his cover to save the child, provoking a massive battle against the cult members. Arjun's team and the Hyderabad HIT unit led by KD arrive via a beacon signal to assist, wiping out the cult. Arjun executes Alpha, discovering that CTK operated under the guise of an NGO named "Keen to Care" (KTC) to harvest endocrine glands from terrified victims for a global pharmaceutical trade to synthesise a highly potent sildenafil for the elite.

Returning to the present frame narrative, Arjun reveals to Samuel Joseph that he knew Joseph was the mastermind behind KTC all along. Having deliberately engineered his own arrest to get close to Joseph, Arjun executes him inside his prison cell. He dedicates the case's success to ACP Dhanya Mohan IPS, an undercover officer who sacrificed her life to protect the infant inside the hideout.

In a mid-credits scene, a new officer in Tamil Nadu, ACP Veerappan IPS, discovers a corpse hidden inside an interstate transport truck at the Andhra–Tamil Nadu border, laying the groundwork for HIT: The Fourth Case.

== Cast ==
- Nani as SP Arjun Sarkaar IPS, HIT Visakhapatnam
- Srinidhi Shetty as ASP Mrudula IPS, HIT Visakhapatnam
- Rao Ramesh as ADGP Nageswara Rao IPS, HIT Visakhapatnam
- Samuthirakani as Arjun Sarkaar's father
- Tisca Chopra as ADGP Karnika Ahuja IPS, HIT Srinagar
- Prateik Smita Patil as Alpha, leader of CTK
- Komalee Prasad as ASP Varsha IPS, HIT Visakhapatnam
- Chaitanya Jonnalagadda as SI Diwakar, HIT Visakhapatnam
- Surya Srinivas as ASP Ravi IPS, HIT Srinagar
- Pranjal Pateriya as Hound
- Ravindra Vijay as Samuel Joseph
- Pavani Karanam as Doctor
- Adil Pala as SI Zubair Ahmed Khan, HIT Srinagar
- Amit Sharma as Alpha's brother
- Nidhi Singh as the female CTK member with whom Arjun Sarkaar fights

Cameo appearances

- Maganti Srinath as SP Abhilash IPS, HIT Hyderabad
- Ruheen Ali Khan as ACP Dhanya Mohan IPS
- Napoleon as ADGP Rajan Sarkaar IPS, Arjun's grandfather (photo presence)
- Adivi Sesh as SP Krishna Dev "KD" IPS, HIT Hyderabad
- Karthi as ACP Veerappan IPS, HIT Chennai
- Chaganti Koteswara Rao as a story narrator (voiceover)

== Production ==
=== Development ===
In December 2022, HIT: The Third Case was announced during the credits of HIT: The Second Case with Nani in the lead role. In February 2024, it was announced that #Nani32 was going to be directed by Sujeeth and produced by D. V. V. Danayya under DVV Entertainment. However due to production delays for They Call Him OG, the film was postponed and in September 2024, it was announced that #Nani32 was going to be HIT: The Third Case directed by Sailesh Kolanu with Prashanti Tipirneni and Nani returning to produce the film under Wall Poster Cinema and Nani's newly announced production house, Unanimous Productions.

=== Filming ===
Principal photography commenced for the film in September 2024 in Hyderabad. The second schedule commenced in October 2024, in Visakhapatnam. In November 2024, important sequences were shot across Jaipur and Sambhar Lake. In December 2024, filming took place across Jammu and Kashmir and Ziro in Arunachal Pradesh. In February 2025, it was reported that filming was scheduled to be finished by March 2025.

== Music ==
HIT: The Third Case

Soundtrack album by Mickey J. Meyer
- Released: 9 June 2025
- Recorded: 2024–25
- Genre: Feature film soundtrack
- Length: 15:28
- Language: Telugu
- Label: Saregama

Mickey J. Meyer chronology
| Mr. Bachchan (2024) | HIT: The Third Case (2025) | Champion (2025) |

Official audio
- HIT 3 – Full Album on YouTube

The music was composed by Mickey J. Meyer, in his second collaboration with Nani after Shyam Singha Roy (2021) and first collaboration with Sailesh Kolanu. The audio rights of the film were acquired by Saregama.

The first single, "Prema Velluva", was released on 24 March 2025. The second single, "Abki Baar Arjun Sarkaar", was released on 9 April 2025. The third single, "Thanu" was released on 25 April 2025. The fourth single, "Poratame 3.0", was released on 6 May 2025.

Track listing
| No. | Title | Lyrics | Singer(s) | Length |
|---|---|---|---|---|
| 1. | "Prema Velluva" | Krishna Kanth | Sid Sriram, Nutana Mohan | 4:12 |
| 2. | "Abki Baar Arjun Sarkaar" | Krishna Kanth | Anurag Kulkarni, Sai Charan, Hymath, Lokesh, Ritesh G. Rao, Akhil Chandra, Harsha Vardhan, Saatvik G. Rao | 4:09 |
| 3. | "Thanu" | Raghav | Anirudh Ravichander | 4:08 |
| 4. | "Poratame 3.0" | Krishna Kanth | Karthik, Sanvi Sudeep, Cizzy (Rap) | 2:59 |
| Total length: | | | | 15:28 |

== Release ==
=== Theatrical ===
HIT: The Third Case was released on 1 May 2025. It received an "A" (adults only) certificate from the Central Board of Film Certification due to its bloody violence. However, some cuts were made and some scenes were blurred to tone down the excessive gore. It was also the second film in the franchise to receive this certificate.

=== Home media ===
The post-theatrical streaming rights of the film were acquired by Netflix for ₹54 crore. The film began streaming on the platform from 29 May 2025 in Telugu and dubbed versions of Hindi, Tamil, Kannada and Malayalam languages.

== Reception ==
=== Critical response ===
HIT: The Third Case received mixed reviews from critics. On the review aggregator website Rotten Tomatoes, 70% of 12 critics' reviews are positive, with an average rating of 6.9/10.

Avad Mohammed of OTTPlay gave 3.5/5 stars and wrote "Nani's boldest avatar is the selling point of the action drama. Coupled with some exciting cameos, the latest addition to the HIT franchise lives up to all the hype created." Sanjay Ponnappa of India Today gave 2.5/5 stars and wrote "Despite the drawbacks, 'HIT 3' can still be considered an entertainer and a fan-feast for most of Nani’s admirers. Not for those expecting to see Nani in his 'chocolate-boy' avatar, though!" BVS Prakash of Deccan Chronicle gave 2/5 stars and wrote "[…] instead of an engaging narrative, we get a stretched-out cop saga that abandons logic and emotional depth for blood, gore, and brute force."

Paul Nicodemus of The Times of India gave 3 out of 5 stars, commending Nani’s intensity and the film’s visuals but noting a lack of narrative coherence. Raisa Nasreen of Times Now rated it 3 out of 5, calling it a "gritty thriller" anchored by Nani but with a predictable plot. Asmita Pant of CNBCTV18 lauded Nani’s performance but founded the emotional beats lacking. Amit Bhatia of ABP Live rated it 2.5 out of 5, describing it as a "blood-soaked thriller" but criticizing its weak storyline.

Neeshita Nyayapati of Hindustan Times gave 2.5 out of 5 stars, stating that Nani "steals the show" in a gory film that needed better execution. Swaroop Kodur of The Hollywood Reporter India praised Nani’s intensity but criticized the lack of nuance. Sangeetha Devi Dundoo of The Hindu stated that Nani lifts a "visually slick but uneven thriller."

=== Box office ===
In India, HIT: The Third Case was released alongside Retro, Tourist Family and Raid 2 collected ₹43 crore (US$4.5 million) worldwide on its opening day. In six days, it has collected a worldwide gross of ₹88 crore, including ₹65 crore domestically.
