= Saindhav =

2024 film directed by Sailesh Kolanu

- Theatrical release poster
- Directed by: Sailesh Kolanu
- Written by: Sailesh Kolanu
- Produced by: Venkat Boyanapalli
- Starring: Venkatesh; Nawazuddin Siddiqui; Arya; Shraddha Srinath; Ruhani Sharma; Andrea Jeremiah
- Cinematography: S. Manikandan
- Edited by: Garry BH
- Music by: Santhosh Narayanan
- Production company: Niharika Entertainment
- Release date: 13 January 2024
- Running time: 138 minutes
- Country: India
- Language: Telugu
- Budget: ₹55 crore

Saindhav is a 2024 Indian Telugu-language action thriller film directed by Sailesh Kolanu and produced by Venkat Boyanapalli under Niharika Entertainment. It stars Venkatesh, alongside Nawazuddin Siddiqui, Arya, Shraddha Srinath, Ruhani Sharma, Andrea Jeremiah and Baby Sara. The music was composed by Santhosh Narayanan, while cinematography and editing were handled by S. Manikandan and Garry BH.

Saindhav was released on 13 January 2024, coinciding with Makar Sankranti, to negative reviews from critics and became a box-office bomb.

== Plot ==
Set in the fictional port city Chandraprastha, Saindhav Koneru alias "SaiKo" has a dark past, leading a quaint family life with his daughter Gayathri and caretaker Manogya. However, SaiKo's life takes a drastic turn when Gayathri is diagnosed with spinal muscular atrophy and requires an injection of Zolgensma, which costs ₹17 crore. Saindhav goes back to the world of crime to extract money for obtaining the money required to treat Gayathri. The crux of the story remains with how Saindhav obtains the vaccine even after knowing that Gayathri is no more, only to help thousands of children like her who are suffering from SMA.

== Cast ==
- Venkatesh as Saindhav Koneru "SaiKo"
- Nawazuddin Siddiqui as Vikas Malik
- Arya as Manas
- Shraddha Srinath as Manogya
- Ruhani Sharma as Dr. Renu
- Andrea Jeremiah as Jasmine
- Ssara Palekar as Gayatri
- Tanikella Bharani as Vinayak Afsar
- Mukesh Rishi as Vishwamithra "Mithra"
- Jisshu Sengupta as Michael
- Jayaprakash as Murthy
- Sudev Nair as John
- Getup Srinu as Ramesh
- Chaitanya Sagiraju as Abhimanyu
- Appaji Ambarisha Darbha as Dr. Ramakrishna
- Kumanan Sethuraman
- Sravanthi Chokkarapu as Anchor

== Production ==
On 23 January 2023, Venkatesh and Sailesh Kolanu announced that they would be collaborating for a new film tentatively titled #Venky75, as it is Venkatesh's 75 film. The makers then on 25 January announced the film titled Saindhav by unveiling the title poster and also a glimpse of it. The film's many portions were shot across Sri Lanka.The team then on Ugadi confirmed the release date which is 22 December 2023. The film then immediately began production with the first schedule taking place in Hyderabad which was soon wrapped up. Then in April, the team shifted to Visakhapatnam for the second schedule of the film. Some portions were also shot in Kakinada.

== Release ==
=== Theatrical ===
The film was released on 13 January 2024, coinciding with the Sankranti festival along with dubbed versions in Hindi and Tamil languages.

=== Home media ===
The digital streaming and satellite rights of the film were sold to Amazon Prime Video and ETV respectively. The film was made available for streaming on Prime Video from 3 February 2024.

== Reception ==
Saindhav received mixed-to-negative reviews from critics with praise for its plot, cast performances, cinematography and action sequences, but criticized its direction, script and music. On the review aggregator website Rotten Tomatoes, 40% of 5 critics' reviews are positive, with an average rating of 5.8/10.

Neeshitha Nyayapati of Hindustan Times wrote "Sailesh Kolanu attempts to make a desi John Wick with Venkatesh as Saiko, but it’s Nawazuddin’s psychotic shenanigans that engage you." Raghu Bandi of The Indian Express gave 2.75/5 stars and wrote "This is a sort of John Wick-meets-Drushyam with a touch of medical thriller in a mythical city that may be inspired by Gotham City. It seems to be the Rana Naidu impact that Venkatesh has chosen a family-centric action thriller as his 75th project."

Avad Mohammed of OTTplay gave 2.5/5 stars and wrote "Venkatesh is superb and Saindhav is his one-man show as his new action-packed avatar is one of the reasons to give the film a shot."

Paul Nicodemus of The Times of India gave 3/5 stars and wrote "Saindhav is an intriguing attempt at blending emotional depth with action. It has engaging moments, and serves as a testament to the evolving nature of Telugu cinema, where traditional storytelling is being melded with contemporary cinematic sensibilities". Sangeetha Devi Dundoo of The Hindu wrote "Saindhav, directed by Sailesh Kolanu and headlined by Venkatesh Daggubati, is earnest in its world building and emotional family drama."
