= Spy (2023 film) =

2023 Telugu film

- Theatrical Release Poster
- Directed by: Garry BH
- Screenplay by: Anirudh Krishnamurthy
- Dialogues by: Abhishek Maharshi
- Story by: K. Rajashekhar Reddy
- Produced by: K. Rajashekhar Reddy
- Starring: Nikhil Siddharth; Iswarya Menon; Abhinav Gomatam; Jisshu Sengupta
- Cinematography: Vamsi Patchipulusu; Mark David; Julian Amaru Estrada; Keiko Nakahara; Manojh Reddy Katasani (1 song)
- Edited by: Garry BH
- Music by: Vishal Chandrasekhar; Sricharan Pakala
- Production company: ED Entertainments
- Release date: 29 June 2023
- Running time: 135 minutes
- Country: India
- Language: Telugu

Spy is a 2023 Indian Telugu-language action spy film directed and edited by Garry BH (in his directorial debut) from a story written by K. Rajashekhar Reddy, who also produced the film. It stars Nikhil Siddhartha, Iswarya Menon, Abhinav Gomatam, Jisshu Sengupta, Aryan Rajesh, Ravi Varma and Sachin Khedekar.

Spy was released worldwide on 29 June 2023 and received highly negative reviews from critics and the audience. The film was a box-office bomb and it became a huge flop in Nikhil's whole movie career.

== Plot ==
RAW agents Jai Vardhan, Kamal and NIA agent Vaishnavi embark on a mission to find the person responsible for the death of Jai's elder brother and fellow RAW agent Subhash Vardhan. They are also given a mission to trace the notorious terrorist, Khadir Khan, who along with a Pakistani scientist Abdur Rahman is planning to unleash a deadly plot to tarnish the reputation of India.

== Cast ==
- Nikhil Siddhartha as RAW agent Jai Vardhan, Subhash's younger brother
- Iswarya Menon as NIA agent Vaishnavi, Jai's love interest
- Abhinav Gomatam as RAW agent Kamal, Jai's colleague and friend
- Jisshu Sengupta as Abdur Rahman
- Nithin Mehta as Khadir Khan
- Aryan Rajesh as RAW agent Subhash Vardhan, Jai's elder brother
- Sanya Thakur as RAW agent Saraswati
- Makrand Deshpande as RAW Chief Shastri
- Ravi Varma as RAW agent Kuldeep
- Sachin Khedekar as Prime Minister Vikramaditya Chauhan
- Posani Krishna Murali as Principal Secretary Naidu
- Suresh as Army Chief VK Nair
- Dayanand Reddy as National Security Advisor Charan Ramaswamy
- Abhijeeth Poondla as Sleeper agent Akram
- Krishna Teja as Eddy, Shastri’s Assistant
- Prisha Singh as Rahman’s daughter
- Tanikella Bharani as Subhash and Jai's father
- Madhumani as Subhash and Jai's mother
- Rana Daggubati as Arjun (cameo appearance)

== Soundtrack ==
Spy

Soundtrack album by Vishal Chandrasekhar Sricharan Pakala
- Released: 11 June 2023
- Genre: Film soundtrack
- Language: Telugu
- Label: Junglee Music

The soundtrack album of the film is composed by Vishal Chandrasekhar and Sricharan Pakala, while Sricharan Pakala composed the film score. The music rights of the film were acquired by Junglee Music. The first track from the album, "Jhoom Jhoom", released on 11 June 2023, followed by the second track, "Azaadi", on 25 June 2023.

Telugu
No.	Title	Lyrics	Music	Singer(s)	Length
1.	"Jhoom Jhoom" (Backing vocals: Pitty Vikram, Sai Vignesh, Shibi Srinivasan, Sridhar Ramesh, Devu Mathew, Feji Ashwin, Priya Sampath)	Kittu Vissapragada	Vishal Chandrasekhar	Anurag Kulkarni, Ramya Behara	4:46
2.	"Azaadi" (Backing vocals: Sricharan Pakala, Gyaani)	Krishna Chaitanya	Sricharan Pakala	Kaala Bhairava	3:39

== Release ==
The film was released on 29 June 2023 in Telugu, along with the dubbed versions of Hindi, Tamil, Malayalam and Kannada languages. The digital distribution rights of the film were brought by Amazon Prime Video for all languages. The film premiered on 27 July 2023 in all languages.

=== Home media ===
The film streaming rights acquired by Amazon Prime Video. ETV Acquired broadcasting rights and telecasted on 3 December 2023.

== Reception ==
Neeshita Nyayapati of The Times of India gave it 2.5 out of 5 stars and wrote, "Garry’s film has its heart in the right place, but it lacks the spunk to stand out". Latha Srinivasan of India Today gave it 2.5 out of 5 stars and wrote, "Spy is a thriller that tries to be a desi Jason Bourne but sorely misses".

Sangeetha Devi Dundoo of The Hindu wrote a review stating, "Spy tries to ride on the nationalistic sentiment but ends up as a bore without a solid story in place." Raghu Bandi of The Indian Express gave it 1 out of 5 stars and wrote, "Nikhil Siddhartha-starrer Spy is a failure mostly due to bad writing and lack of seriousness in presenting the story".

Abhilasha Cherukuri of The New Indian Express gave it 1 out of 5 stars and wrote, "Spy is a crude and visually impoverished film that reduces Netaji Subhash Chandra Bose to a clickbait". A critic from The Hans India gave it 1.5 out of 5 stars and wrote, "Spy ticks all spy genre-related cliches and serves them in a screenplay with nonstop action. Only here, the ‘action’ neither thrills nor awes. It is as bland as it comes".

On 26 October 2023, Nikhil, the hero of the film, conveyed his dissatisfaction with the movie and asserted that it had faltered because the filmmakers had initiated post-production with 10 days of actual shooting still remaining. He further promised to prevent such occurrences from happening again.
