= Aaha Kalyanam =

2014 Indian film by A. Gokul Krishna

- Theatrical release poster
- Directed by: A. Gokul Krishna
- Screenplay by: Habib Faisal
- Dialogues by: Rajiv Rajaram
- Story by: Maneesh Sharma
- Based on: Band Baaja Baaraat by Maneesh Sharma
- Produced by: Aditya Chopra
- Starring: Nani; Vaani Kapoor; Simran
- Cinematography: Loganathan Srinivasan
- Edited by: Bavan Sreekumar
- Music by: Dharan Kumar
- Production company: Yash Raj Films
- Distributed by: Yash Raj Films
- Release date: 21 February 2014
- Running time: 142 minutes
- Country: India
- Language: Tamil

Aaha Kalyanam (transl. Wow Marriage) is a 2014 Indian Tamil-language romantic comedy film directed by A.Gokul Krishna (in his directoral debut) and produced by Aditya Chopra's Yash Raj Films. A remake of Maneesh Sharma's 2010 Hindi film, Band Baaja Baaraat, the film stars Nani, Vaani Kapoor, and Simran. Although it was planned for bilingual release, it was shot completely in Tamil, and a dubbed Telugu version was released simultaneously along with the Tamil version. The film was released worldwide on 21 February 2014.

== Plot ==
Shakthi, a street-smart and fun-loving guy, attends a wedding where he encounters Shruti, an intelligent and quirky woman assisting the wedding coordinator. Shruti suspects Shakthi of gatecrashing to eat for free, but he convinces her that he's part of the film crew. Intrigued by Shruti's dance at the wedding, Shakthi records a video of her routine and tracks her down the next day. However, Shruti reveals her ambition of starting her own wedding planning business, showing no interest in Shakthi's advances.

Both Shakthi and Shruti face familial pressures—Shakthi is urged to return to his village and work in the sugarcane fields, while Shruti's family wants her to get married soon. Shruti makes a deal with her parents to focus on her exams and take five years to establish her business before marriage. When Shakthi's father arrives to take him back, Shakthi lies about starting a wedding planning business and stays with Shruti. Despite promising no romantic complications, Shruti rejects his advances.

Shruti hopes to learn about planning high-class weddings and meets Chandralekha, a renowned wedding planner. Shakthi accompanies Shruti, and Chandra offers him a job after spotting him. Shakthi accepts on the condition that Shruti is hired too. While working with Chandra, Shruti discovers her unethical practices, leading to a confrontation with an angry client. Shakthi defends Shruti and both quit, starting their own business, "Getti Melam," with equal partnership.

They begin organizing small weddings successfully and eventually land a big client. After a hectic yet successful wedding, they celebrate and end up haveing sex. Shakthi feels uneasy and avoids Shruti, unaware that she has fallen in love with him. Misunderstanding her intentions, he tells her the night meant nothing to him. Shruti hides her true feelings but is heartbroken.

Their strained relationship leads to a major fight, causing Shruti to break their partnership, forcing Shakthi to start his own business. Both struggle financially and accumulate debt. However, they receive a lucrative contract that requires them to work together. Despite their differences, they collaborate to recover their losses, dividing the workload. During the wedding preparations, Shakthi tries to dissuade Shruti from getting married, claiming it's wrong and driven by revenge. However, Shruti defends her decision, revealing she moved on after realizing Shakthi didn't reciprocate her love.

Shakthi realizes his love for Shruti but was afraid it would affect their business. Desperate to win her back, he confronts Shruti's fiancé and confesses his love for her. Upon learning about Shakthi's actions, Shruti breaks off her engagement and meets Shakthi on a rooftop. They confess their love for each other, and Shruti calls off her engagement, sealing their reconciliation with a passionate hug.

== Cast ==
- Nani as Shakthivel "Shakthi"
- Vaani Kapoor as Shruti Subramaniam (Voice dubbed by Chinmayi)
- Simran as Chandralekha, a famous wedding-planner (Voice dubbed by Deepa Venkat)
- Karthik Nag as GK
- Badava Gopi as Hyder
- M. J. Shriram as Ramesh
- Five Star Krishna as Inspector Akhilan
- Dhanajayan as Tyre King
- Neela as Shruti's mother
- Paaki as Shruthi's father
- Henna as Shruthi's sister
- Ajith Menon as Shakthi's father
- Azhar as Danny
- Shuvakar S as Rahul
- Shwetha Shekar as Shalini
- Gandarv Dhinora as Abbas
- Gayatri MR as Sana

== Production ==
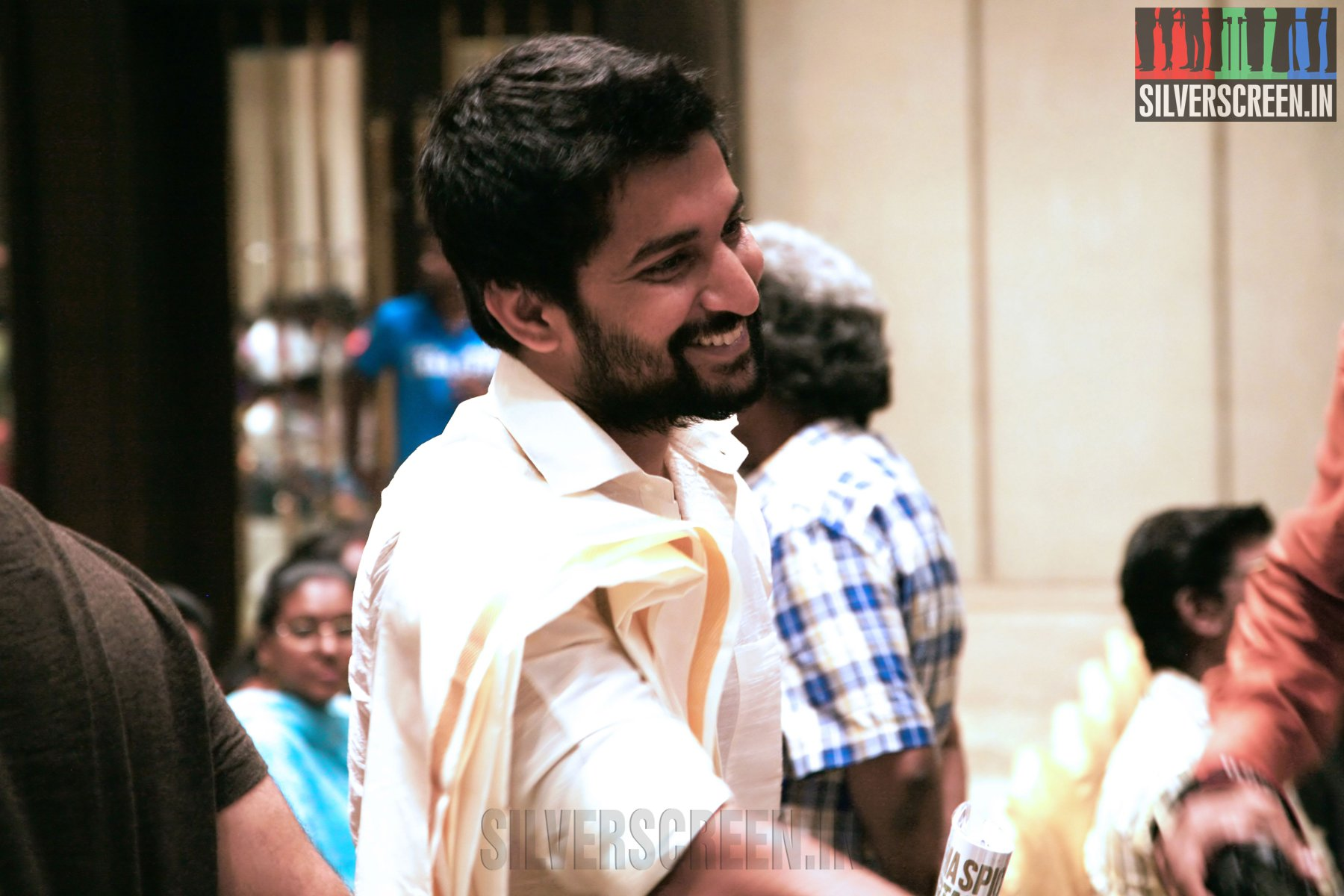
Nani at the Audio Launch of the film

UTV Motion Pictures were reported to have cast Ravi Teja and Trisha in the Telugu version of the film titled Bamchikbam, but the studio later dismissed reports. Other reports suggested that Tamannaah would feature in a Tamil version of the film alongside a newcomer, but Yash Raj Films maintained that they had not sold the remake rights of the film and would produce South Indian versions of the film themselves. The Tamil and Telugu versions of the film were cast in doubt when Yash Raj Studios chose to pursue legal action against the makers of the Telugu film, Jabardasth, citing the film's plot was inspired directly from Band Baaja Baaraat. However, the producers maintained that a South Indian version would still go ahead.

Nani signed on to be the leading actor of the film in December 2012 and a photo shoot was held with actress Vaani Kapoor, who had appeared in Yash Raj Films' Hindi ventures, by March 2013. During the making of the film, Vaani Kapoor took training in Tamil and Telugu, while she also revealed that the original Hindi film's script would be adapted to suit the culture of the South Indian audience. Dharan Kumar was signed on to be music director for the project, composing new tunes rather than retaining the original film's music.

The project began shoot by the end of May 2013 and shot in Hyderabad with Padam Kumar, head of Yash Raj Film's operation in South India, being appointed the creative producer on the project. Scenes were shot predominantly in a swift schedule in Chennai, completing most portions of the shoot with little publicity. The team then shot a schedule in early September 2013 in Mysore in a set erected near Lalith Mahal Hotel, with rain partially disrupting progress. Although it was planned as a bilingual it was completely filmed in Tamil only and was later dubbed in Telugu while the songs and climax scenes were individually shot in both the languages.

== Soundtrack ==
Aaha Kalyanam

Soundtrack album by Dharan Kumar
- Released: 5 January 2014
- Recorded: 2013
- Genre: Feature film soundtrack
- Language: Tamil
- Label: Yash Raj Music
- Producer: Dharan Kumar

Dharan Kumar chronology
Inga Enna Solluthu (2013)	Aaha Kalyanam (2014)	Naaigal Jaakirathai (2014)

The soundtrack for Aaha Kalyanam was composed by Dharan Kumar. The lyrics were written by Thamarai and Madhan Karky.

All lyrics are written by Madhan Karky (except where noted).

Track list
No.	Title	Singer(s)	Length
1.	"Kadha Kadha"	Chinmayi
2.	"Honeyae Honeyae - Male"	Naresh Iyer
3.	"Bon Bon"	Haricharan, Sunidhi Chauhan
4.	"Koottali Koottali"	Benny Dayal, Usha Uthup
5.	"Padhiye Padhiye - Female"	Shakthisree Gopalan
6.	"Mazhaiyin Saaralil" (Thamarai)	Naresh Iyer, Shweta Mohan
7.	"Aaha Kalyanam - Instrumental"	Instrumental
8.	"The Punch Song"	M. M. Manasi, Nivas
9.	"Padhiye Padhiye - Male"	Abhay Jodhpurkar
10.	"Honeyae Honeyae - Female"	Supriya Ramalingam

== Release ==
The film initially scheduled to release on 7 February 2014 but postponed to 21 February 2014. The film released in 900 screens worldwide for both versions.

=== Critical reception ===
Baradwaj Rangan from The Hindu wrote "Gokul Krishna's remake follows the original almost beat for beat, but never does anything more. And despite some wonderfully conversational dialogue, we're left with the strange feeling of watching a Hindi movie dubbed in Tamil, along with the realisation that a story alone doesn't make a movie." IANS gave the film 2.5 stars out of 5 and stated "Aaha Kalyanam is like going to a colourful wedding and being served tasteless food." Gautaman Bhaskaran from Hindustan Times gave a review stating "Indeed, despite high production values (a contrast to most Tamil movies which suffer in this area) and an impressive degree of sophistry (which Bollywood cinema is known for), Aaha Kalyanam did not wow me" and rated the film 2/5.

M. Suganth of The Times of India rated the film 3 stars out of 5 and stated "like the concept of wedding planning, the film too feels a little alien, and we don't really fall in love with it entirely.... And, yet, for all these flaws, Aaha Kalyanam manages to hold your interest and that is mainly because of Habib Faisal's winning script." Sify wrote, "This new-age romance works big time due to the spontaneity of the fresh lead pair, as they light up the screen with their terrific on-screen chemistry. Debutant director Gokul Krisha has packaged the film smartly." IndiaGlitz too gave a positive review stating "In all, the movie is a clean entertainer for all" and added that the film is a "Fun, frolic and colourful lighthearted enjoyment" and rated the film 3.5/5. Behindwoods gave 2.75 stars out of 5 and wrote, "Aaha Kalyanam is like a near perfect wedding, which has very less unpleasant moments that are completely overshadowed by the overflowing happiness."
