= D for Dopidi =

- Poster
- Directed by: Siraj Kalla
- Written by: Siraj Kalla
- Produced by: Raj & DK; Nani
- Starring: Varun Sandesh; Sundeep Kishan; Naveen Polishetty; Rakesh Rachakonda; Melanie Kannokada
- Narrated by: Nani
- Cinematography: Lucas
- Edited by: Dharmendra Kakarala
- Music by: Mahesh Shankar; Sachin–Jigar
- Production companies: d2r Films; SVC
- Release date: 25 December 2013
- Country: India
- Language: Telugu

D for Dopidi (transl. S for Stealing) is a 2013 Telugu-language heist comedy film directed by Siraj Kalla starring Varun Sandesh, Sundeep Kishan, Naveen Polishetty, Rakesh Rachakonda and Melanie Kannokada. It was inspired from Malladi Venkata Krishnamurthy's novel Thommidi Gantalu. It is co-produced by Raj & DK and Nani, who also lent his voice as the narrator and did a promo video. Mahesh Shankar composed the music. The film released on 25 December 2013. It received mixed feedback from critics but the majority audience enjoyed this new kind of cinema.

== Plot ==
Vicky (Varun Sandesh), Raju (Sundeep Kishan), Harish (Naveen Polishetty) and Bannu (Rakesh Rachakonda), the four central characters in the film, need money desperately to overcome their problems. Each one has his own story. After having looked into other avenues for a solution, they finally embark upon an ignoble bank robbery. Everything goes according to plan till they enter the bank where they are confronted by another gang of robbers led by Lokamuddhu (Tanikella Bharani). Trouble starts as things get horribly messed up. What happens next – are they successful in their heist and are able to get rid of their problems finally – forms, predictably enough, the crux of the story.

== Cast ==
- Varun Sandesh as Vikram alias Vicky
- Sundeep Kishan as Rajiv alias Raju
- Naveen Polishetty as Harish
- Rakesh Rachakonda as Bannu
- Melanie Kannokada as Shalini
- Tanikella Bharani as Lokamuddhu
- Deva Katta as A.C.P. Krishnamachari
- Hema as Bank Assistant Manager
- Pippalla Raj as Rutherford
- Rishi Muvva
- Josh Ravi as Bank Attender
- Pavala Syamala as Bank Attender's mother
- Syed Sohel as Rahul, bank customer (uncredited role)

== Soundtrack ==
The film's soundtrack was composed by Mahesh Shankar and the duo Sachin–Jigar, marking their Telugu debut. The soundtrack album was released by Aditya Music. The songs "Meher Meher" and "Rowdy Fellows" were reused by Sachin–Jigar the following year for the Hindi films Happy Ending and Entertainment respectively as "Jaise Mera Tu", crooned by Arijit Singh and Priya Saraiya, and "Teri Mahima Aprampaar", sung by Udit Narayan and Anushka Manchanda, the singer of the original version; both adaptations were popular with audiences, "Jaise Mera Tu" particularly becoming a chartbuster.

D for Dopidi

Soundtrack album by Mahesh Shankar
- Released: 28 September 2013
- Recorded: 2013
- Genre: Soundtrack
- Length: 17:31
- Label: Aditya Music
- Producer: Mahesh Shankar

Mahesh Shankar chronology
Bangaru Kodipetta (2013)	D for Dopidi (2013)	Manamantha (2016)

Track list
No.	Title	Lyrics	Music	Singer(s)	Length
1.	"Rowdy Fellows"	Krishna Chaitanya	Sachin–Jigar	Anushka Manchanda, Ishq Bector, Shudeep	3:21
2.	"Meher Meher"	Krishna Chaitanya	Sachin–Jigar	Priya Saraiya, Karunya, Madhav Krishna	4:09
3.	"Ding Dong"	Krishna Chaitanya	Mahesh Shankar	Deepak	3:50
4.	"D For Dopidi"	Krishna Chaitanya	Mahesh Shankar	Deepak	3:10
5.	"Rum Pum Pum"	Krishna Chaitanya	Mahesh Shankar	Shudeep	3:01
Total length:					17:31

== Reception ==
Reports say the film was made on a budget of ₹20 million (US$210,000) & the publicity budget was ₹ 5 million. It was heard that the film's Satellite rights were sold for ₹17.5 million (US$180,000)by Gemini TV.

Given these statistics, it appears that the film has run into profits right from the day of its release.

The curious case of "D For Dopidi" baffled many. The majority of the audience and a few top critics loved the film and appreciated the different style and humour presented in the film. Jeevi of idlebrain.com reviewed "If you like the crime comedy angle in films like Money, Kshana Kshanam and Anaganaga Oka Roju, you are going to love 'D for Dopidi'. You may watch it!" by giving a rating of 3.25 on a scale of 5. In contrast, many of the reviewers were not impressed. This film showed the divide between the audience and critics as to how some welcome the change in Telugu cinema and the rest resist.
