= Meet Cute (TV series) =

Web series by Deepthi Ganta for SonyLIV

- Genre: Anthology; Drama
- Created by: Deepthi Ganta
- Directed by: Deepthi Ganta
- Starring: Sathyaraj; Aakanksha Singh; Adah Sharma; Varsha Bollamma; Ashwin Kumar Lakshmikanthan; Shiva Kandukuri
- Music by: Vijai Bulganin
- Country of origin: India
- Original language: Telugu
- No. of seasons: 1
- No. of episodes: 5

Production
- Producers: Nani; Prashanti Tipirneni
- Editor: Garry BH
- Camera setup: A. Vasanth
- Production company: Wall Poster Cinema

Original release
- Network: SonyLIV
- Release: 25 November – 25 November 2022

Meet Cute is a 2022 Indian Telugu-language anthology drama streaming television series written and directed by debutant Deepthi Ganta for SonyLIV. The series stars Sathyaraj, Aakanksha Singh, Adah Sharma, Ashwin Kumar Lakshmikanthan, Ruhani Sharma, Shiva Kandukuri and Sanchitha Poonacha in the lead roles. Vijay Bulganin has composed the music and the series is produced by Nani and Prashanti Tipirneni under 'Wall Poster Cinema' banner. The trailer for the series was released on 18 November and the series premiered on 25 November 2022 and was very well received by critics and appreciated by audience.

== Plot ==
First encounters between the characters lead to new experiences and discoveries in this anthology series. Swathi, Saru, Padma, Shalini and Anjana's "meet-cutes" change their perspectives on life.

== Cast ==
=== Meet The Boy ===
- Ashwin Kumar Lakshmikanthan as Abhi
- Varsha Bollamma as Swathi
- Srividya P as Ninu
- Sameer Malla as Pavan, Ninu's boyfriend

=== Old Is Gold ===
- Ruhani Sharma as Saroja 'Saru' 'Sarojamma'
- Sathyaraj as Mohan Rao, Retired journalist
- Raja Chembolu as Jai, Saru's husband

=== In L(aw)ove ===
- Rohini as Padma
- Aakanksha Singh as Pooja, Siddharth's girl friend
- Dheekshith Shetty as Siddharth, Padma's son
- Surekha Vani as Lakshmi, Padma's friend
- Sripriya Iduri as Divya, Pooja's friend

=== Star Struck ===
- Shiva Kandukuri as Dr.Aman
- Adah Sharma as Shalini
- Alekhya Harika as Meera, Shalini's stylist

=== Ex-Girlfriend ===
- Sunainaa as Kiran
- Sanchitha Poonacha as Anjana
- Govind Padmasoorya as Ajay
- Kivish as Pavan, Anjana's brother
- Kalyani Natarajan as Sashikala, Anjana's mother
- DD Srinivas as Ramesh, Kiran's father

== Episodes ==
No.	Title	Original release date
1	"Meet the Boy"	25 November 2022
Swathi, An accomplished IT professional, yet an obedient daughter reluctantly meets the boy arranged by her mom. Abhi, the boy, who seems really eager to impress her has a reason and was he able to sway Swathi makes this story that kick starts meet cute and sets the stage.
2	"Old is Gold"	25 November 2022
Saru, who is excited about the girls trip that she is making to Paris and is about to pick up her passport in a consulate, meets Mohan Rao, a retired journalist, who is also at the consulate applying for a visa for his trip to Switzerland. The conversations between the two and Mohan Rao’s take on relationships that changes Saru’s perspective makes up this sweet story of why old is always gold.
3	"In L(aw)ove"	25 November 2022
Padma, a doting mother, accidentally finds her son with a girl on her way back from grocery shopping. She follows them and ends up at a dog shelter where the girl volunteers over the weekend. What starts off as a spying mother wanting to know more about the son's secret girlfriend, eventually becomes a heartwarming conversation between two women who love the same boy for the same reasons.
4	"Star Struck"	25 November 2022
Shalini, a celebrity/star on her way back from an award function is stranded on a street due to a broken down car and rain. The stylist who accompanies her hitches her a ride with a stranger who does not recognize her. How this star is struck by the chivalry of a complete stranger makes up this story that highlights what makes a gentleman and how a man that is anything but what is considered a macho stereotype can be completely charming.
5	"Ex-Girlfriend"	25 November 2022
Anjana, after an altercation over a date night dinner with her newly married husband, Ajay, ends up on a beach. Anjana runs into Kiran, Ajay’s Ex Girlfriend, who also happens to be on the beach. Anjana and Kiran’s conversations on how contradicting their perspectives are about Ajay makes up this story of love and loss.

== Reception ==
The series opened to good reviews from India Today and Mirchi9. The Hindu's Sangeetha Devi Dundoo wrote "Meet Cute is a mixed bag, with a few standout stories and other cheerful but generic ones".
