= HIT: The Second Case =

2022 film by Sailesh Kolanu

- Theatrical release poster
- Directed by: Sailesh Kolanu
- Written by: Sailesh Kolanu
- Produced by: Prashanti Tipirneni
- Starring: Adivi Sesh; Meenakshi Chaudhary; Suhas
- Cinematography: S. Manikandan
- Edited by: Garry BH
- Music by: Songs: M. M. Srilekha; Score: John Stewart Eduri
- Production company: Wall Poster Cinema
- Release date: 2 December 2022
- Running time: 118 minutes
- Country: India
- Language: Telugu
- Budget: ₹15 crore
- Box office: ₹41.85–43.40 crore

HIT: The Second Case (Note: HIT is the abbreviation of Homicide Intervention Team.) is a 2022 Indian Telugu-language crime thriller film written and directed by Sailesh Kolanu. Produced by Wall Poster Cinema, it is the second instalment in the HIT film series following HIT: The First Case (2020). The film stars Adivi Sesh, Meenakshi Chaudhary, Suhas and Rao Ramesh. In the film, a police officer in the Andhra Pradesh state Homicide Intervention Team (HIT) investigates gruesome cases involving dismembered bodies of women.

HIT: The Second Case was released worldwide on 2 December 2022 in theatres. The film received positive reviews from critics and became a commercial success at the box office. A standalone sequel, HIT: The Third Case, was released on 1 May 2025.

== Plot ==
Ram Prasad Koduri, a humble carpenter, discovers his wife Jhansi's extramarital affair. When he threatens to expose her, she falsely accuses him of sexual assault. Ostracized by society and broken in spirit, Ram Prasad builds a treehouse at home and commits suicide.

In present-day Visakhapatnam, Krishna Dev (KD), a sharp and intuitive Superintendent of police (SP) in the Homicidal Intervention Team (HIT), is in a live-in relationship with Aarya, an entrepreneur and women's rights activist. KD is assigned a disturbing murder case involving Sanjana, a bar worker, whose body is found dismembered and stitched together with parts from three different women. Forensics reveals that the killer has an extra tooth and left a UV-reactive pub stamp on a severed hand.

KD suspects Raghavudu, who refuses to reveal his alibi to protect his secret affair. Under political pressure, KD's superiors plan to kill Raghavudu in a fake encounter. KD uncovers evidence proving his innocence and stops the encounter at the last moment, but Raghavudu later commits suicide. KD is taunted by the killer, who threatens Aarya and another woman, Rajitha.

As the investigation deepens, KD links the dismembered parts to other missing women, Tanya and Pooja, all connected to a women's welfare association. He discovers that Jhansi, a past victim and president of the same association, had a son named Rajeev. Meanwhile, the ADGP dismisses KD from police force and withdraws police protection given to Aarya, as he finds out that KD had leaked police's plan to encounter Raghavudu in the attempt to stop the encounter. Soon after, Aarya is abducted.

KD tracks the clues to a dental clinic owned by Rajeev Kumar Koduri, Ram Prasad and Jhansi's son. Traumatised by his father's suicide and his mother's betrayal, Rajeev seeks revenge on women he views as morally corrupt, starting with his mother and continuing with other women's association members. Rajeev is revealed to be Kumar, Rajitha's boyfriend, who captures KD and threatens Aarya who is strapped to a wheelchair and starts torturing KD who is tied onto a dental clinic chair. KD successfully makes Rajeev to open the main door thus calling his dog inside by whistling sound. The dog attacks Rajeev who is shot by Varsha. Rajeev but Rajeev manages to overwhelm Varsha and starts thrashing her. The dog is shot by Rajeev and an angry KD breaks his restraints and beats Rajeev severely. Rajitha confesses she was coerced by Rajeev. KD gets carried to hospital, and later ADGP reluctantly apologises to KD and informs that his dismissal is withdrawn. Disillusioned with the ADGP's attitude, KD declines to continue in HIT Andhra Pradesh and has himself transferred to Telangana. He marries Aarya, and they begin a new life together. Arjun Sarkaar arrives as KD's replacement as the new SP, teasing a sequel.

== Cast ==
- Adivi Sesh as SP Krishna Dev "KD" IPS HIT, Visakhapatnam
- Meenakshi Chaudhary as Aarya
- Suhas as Dr. Rajeev Kumar Koduri alias Kumar, Ram Prasad's son
- Rao Ramesh as DGP Nageswara Rao IPS HIT, Visakhapatnam
- Tanikella Bharani as Sanjana's father
- Posani Krishna Murali as News reporter
- Komalee Prasad as ASP Varsha IPS, HIT Visakhapatnam
- Maganti Srinath as SP Abhilash IPS, HIT Hyderabad
- Madhusudhan Rao as DGP Ramaiah IPS
- Srikanth Iyengar as IG Ramesh Khanna, HIT Hyderabad
- Harsha Vardhan as Ram Prasad Koduri
- Divya Narni as Rajitha
- Gujjuru Hemanth as a Constable
- Kedar Shankar as KD's father
- Brahmaji as R. Shinde
- Kancharapalem Raju as Raghavudu's father
- Dhaasshyam Geetha Bhascker as Aarya's mother
- Nani as SP Arjun Sarkaar IPS(cameo appearance)
- Vishwak Sen as SP Vikram Rudraraju IPS(Archive footage)

== Production ==
After the success of HIT: The First Case, Nani announced a sequel in February 2021, one year after the film's release. Sailesh Kolanu, who directed the first film of the franchise, would also be directing the sequel. Adivi Sesh replaced Vishwak Sen in the sequel as the main character. Nani wanted the franchise to be "concept oriented" rather than "star oriented," so he moved the setting from Telangana to Andhra Pradesh and chose Sesh as the protagonist. Meenakshi Chaudhary was cast opposite Sesh. Sen said he missed out on the sequel due to scheduling conflicts, and wished he'd be a part of HIT 3 or 4. The film was then formally launched in March 2021 with a pooja ceremony. Principal photography commenced in August 2021 in Visakhapatnam. In December 2021, Nani confirmed that 90% of the shoot was completed with filming also taking place in Hyderabad. In July 2022, it was announced that the final schedule would commence in August 2022.

== Music ==
The music of the film is composed by M. M. Srilekha and Suresh Bobbili. The film score is composed by John Stewart Eduri.

All lyrics are written by Krishna Kanth.

Track listing
No.	Title	Music	Singer(s)	Length
1.	"Urike Urike"	M. M. Srilekha	Sid Sriram, Ramya Behara	4:36
2.	"Poratame 2"	Suresh Bobbili	Sailesh Kolanu	3:45

== Release ==
HIT: The Second Case was released theatrically on 2 December 2022. Originally the film had been scheduled for release on 29 July 2022. However, Sesh announced that the film was postponed due to the promotional works of his film Major (2022) and the film having production delays. On November 25, the film received an A certificate because of its gruesome nature and use of profanity.

The theatrical rights of the film were sold at a cost of ₹145 million (US$1.5 million). A Hindi dubbed version was released theatrically on 30 December 2022. The film premiered on Amazon Prime Video on 6 January 2023.

== Reception ==
HIT: The Second Case received positive reviews from critics.

Balakrishna Ganeshan of The News Minute rated the film 3.5 out of 5 stars and wrote "Sailesh Kolanu's HIT 2 is one of the best-written Telugu films in recent times, with each character, scene, and dialogue having relevance to the story". Manoj Kumar R of The Indian Express rated the film 2.5 out of 5 stars and wrote "HIT 2 is a significant improvement over the first iteration. One can only hope that Sailesh fills in the gaps in his storytelling and becomes a more refined filmmaker with HIT 3". Neeshita Nyayapati of The Times of India rated the film 2.5 out of 5 stars and wrote "The film delivers what it promises when it comes to the gore and taking the HIT universe forward". Rotkim Rajpal of India Today rated the film 2.5 out of 5 stars and wrote "HIT 2 is a middling thriller that caters only to Advi Sesh but doesn't do justice to its inherently engaging story". Sakshi Post rated the film 2.5 out of 5 stars and termed the film as a "gripping thriller" and wrote, "If you are a fan of crime thrillers, you would surely love this. Watch it for Adivi Sesh".

== Accolades ==
Award (Note: Awards, festivals and organizations are in alphabetical order.)	Date of ceremony (Note: Date is linked to the article about the awards held that year, wherever possible.)	Category	Recipient(s)	Result
South Indian International Movie Awards	15 September 2023	SIIMA Award for Best Actor in a Negative Role – Telugu	Suhas	Won
