= Prashanti Tipirneni =

Indian costume designer and producer

- Occupations: Costume designer, producer
- Years active: 2010–present

Prashanti Tipirneni is an Indian costume designer and producer who is noted for her work in Telugu films. She is daughter of laksmi prasad tipirneni. She started her career with the 2010 film Vedam and later worked for the Baahubali film series. She was nominated along with Rama Rajamouli for Best Costume Design at the 42nd Saturn Awards and at the 12th Asian Film Awards for Baahubali 1 and Baahubali 2 respectively.

Tipirneni ventured into film production with Awe (2018) under her production studio Wall Poster Cinema in association with actor Nani.

== Films ==
=== As a costume designer ===
Year	Film
2010	Vedam
2011	Golconda High School
2015	Size Zero
2015	Baahubali: The Beginning
2017	Baahubali: The Conclusion

=== As a producer ===
Year	Film
2018	Awe
2020	HIT: The First Case
2022	Meet Cute
2022	HIT: The Second Case
2025	Court – State vs a Nobody
2025	HIT: The Third Case
