= Meenakshi Chaudhary =

Indian actress and beauty pageant titleholder (born 1997)

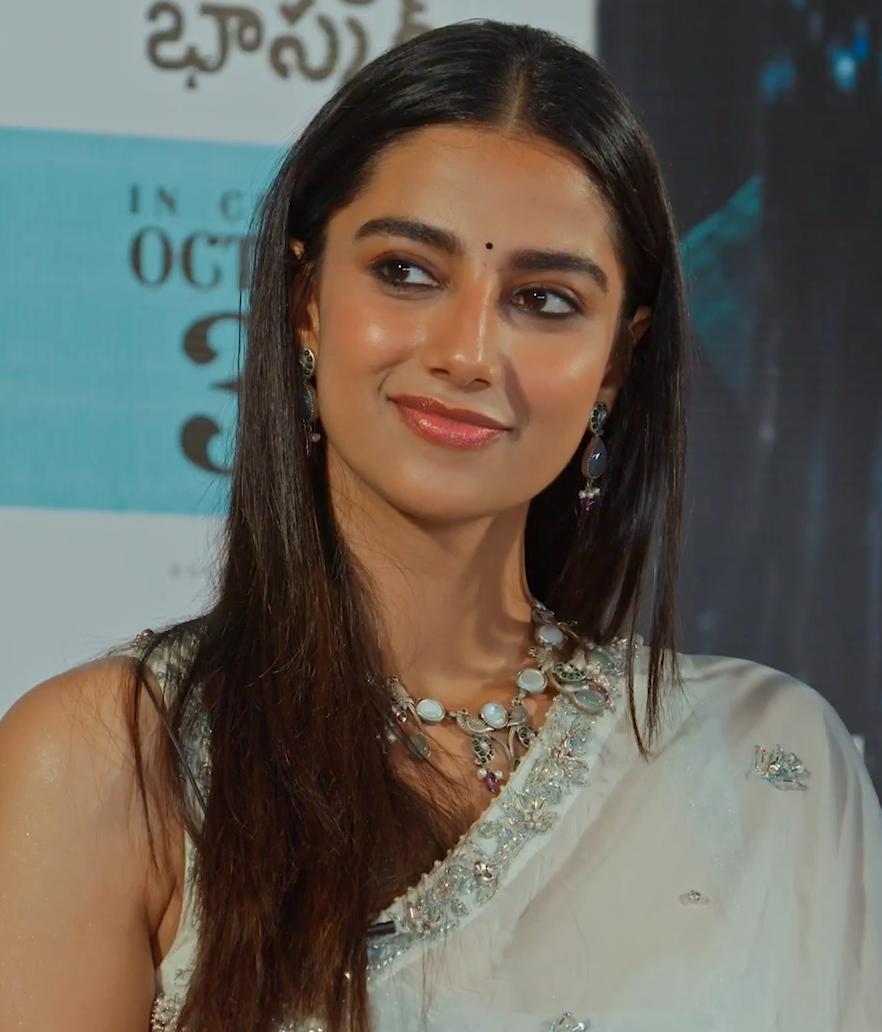
- Chaudhary in 2024
- Born: 5 March 1997 (age 29); Panchkula, Haryana, India
- Education: National Dental College
- Occupations: Actress; beauty pageant titleholder
- Title: Femina Miss India 2018 (1st runner-up); Miss Grand International 2018 (1st runner-up)

Meenakshi Chaudhary (born 5 March 1997) is an Indian actress and beauty pageant titleholder who works primarily in Telugu and Tamil films. At the Femina Miss India 2018 pageant, Chaudhary was crowned Femina Miss India Grand International 2018. She represented India at Miss Grand International 2018 and finished as the first runner-up.

Chaudhary made her film debut with the Hindi film Upstarts (2019) before making her lead debut in the Telugu film Ichata Vahanamulu Niluparadu (2021). She followed this with commercial successes including HIT: The Second Case (2022), The Greatest of All Time (2024), Lucky Baskhar (2024), and Sankranthiki Vasthunam (2025). Her performance in Lucky Baskhae earned her the SIIMA Critics Award for Best Actress – Telugu.

== Early life and education ==
Meenakshi Chaudhary was born on 5 March 1997 into a Punjabi family in Panchkula, Haryana, India. Her father, late B. R. Chaudhary, was a colonel in the Indian Army. She completed her schooling from St. Soldier International Convent School in Chandigarh. She is also a state-level swimmer and badminton player. Chaudhary completed her bachelor's degree in dental surgery from the National Dental College and Hospital in Dera Bassi, Punjab.

== Pageantry ==
=== Miss IMA 2017 ===
In 2017, Chaudhary was adjudged as Miss IMA during the Indian Military Academy Autumn Ball Night, which is held towards the end of each term, to mark the culmination of the training schedule of military cadets.

=== Femina Miss India ===
Chaudhary in 2018, following her Femina Miss India win

Chaudhary auditioned for the Fashion Big Bazaar sponsored Campus Princess 2018 where she was crowned as one of the winners from Patiala auditions. She then auditioned for the title Femina Miss Haryana 2018, which she eventually won. She represented the state of Haryana in the annual Femina Miss India competition.

She was crowned 1st runner up at the Femina Miss India 2018 that took place in Sardar Vallabhbhai Patel Indoor Stadium, Mumbai, on 19 June 2018. She also won the sub-title 'Miss Photogenic' at the competition.

=== Miss Grand International ===
Later, it was revealed by the Miss India Organisation that Chaudhary had been considered as Miss Grand India, and would represent India at Miss Grand International 2018 pageant. She was officially crowned as Miss Grand India 2018 by the then reigning Miss Grand International 2017, María José Lora of Peru.

Chaudhary represented India at Miss Grand International 2018 pageant in Yangon, Myanmar, where she made it to the top 5 of the Miss Popular sub-contest. At the end of the event, she won the first runner-up title to the eventual winner, Clara Sosa of Paraguay. She is the first Indian woman to reach the said placement at the pageant.

In May 2019, Chaudhary was voted to the 2nd place in the list of "Times 50 Most Desirable Women of India 2018", in an internet survey conducted by The Times of India. At the Femina Miss India 2019 sub-contest crowning ceremony, she was felicitated by the Miss India Organisation for her accomplishments at Miss Grand International.

== Acting career ==
=== Debut and early work (2019-2023) ===
Chaudhary made her acting debut with a brief role in the Hindi film Upstarts (2019). In the same year, she starred in the web series, Out of Love, an official adaptation of BBC drama series Doctor Foster. She played a women who faces adversity for having a relationship with a married man alongside Purab Kohli.

In 2020, Chaudhary made her Telugu debut when she was cast as an architecture intern opposite Sushanth, in Ichata Vahanamulu Niluparadu. Apart from pursuing her dental degree and modelling assignments, Chaudhary had enrolled in workshops. A month after the workshop, she was called by Sushanth to discuss a film script, which she accepted.

Chaudhary had two releases in 2022. She first played a criminologist opposite Ravi Teja in Khiladi. The film met with negative reviews and underperformed at the box office. She then played a women right activist opposite Adivi Sesh in HIT: The Second Case. Balakrishna Ganeshan of The News Minute was appreciative of her performance and felt her character was an "integral part" of the film. The film emerged a commercial success. In 2023, she made her Tamil debut with Kolai opposite Vijay Antony.

=== Career progression and recognition (2024-present) ===
Chaudhary in 2024

Chaudhary's career marked a turning point in 2024 when she had six film releases: Guntur Kaaram alongside Mahesh Babu, Singapore Saloon opposite RJ Balaji, The Greatest of All Time opposite Vijay, Lucky Baskhar opposite Dulquer Salman, Matka opposite Varun Tej and Mechanic Rocky opposite Vishwak Sen. In The Greatest of All Time, she played an ATS officer's daughter. The film emerged a box office success and the eight highest-grossing Tamil film of all time. Avinash Ramachandran of The Indian Express stated, "Meenakshi gets a decent role, and she does justice to a character who is just an arm candy most of the time and becomes efficiently vulnerable at the right moment." Lucky Baskhar saw her play a wealthy woman married to a cashier. Sangeetha Devi Dundoo of The Hindu noted, "Meenakshi gets a reasonably well-written part and portrays her character effectively". The film earned her first nomination for Filmfare Award for Best Actress – Telugu. It emerged a commercial success and seventh highest-grossing Telugu film of the year.

In 2025, she played a police officer opposite Venkatesh in Sankranthiki Vasthunam. A box office success, it became the second highest-grossing Telugu film of the year. Chaudhary's first release of 2026 came with Anaganaga Oka Raju, where she played a women pretending to be rich opposite Naveen Polishetty. The film became a commercial success and the sixth highest-grossing Telugu film of the year.

== Media image ==
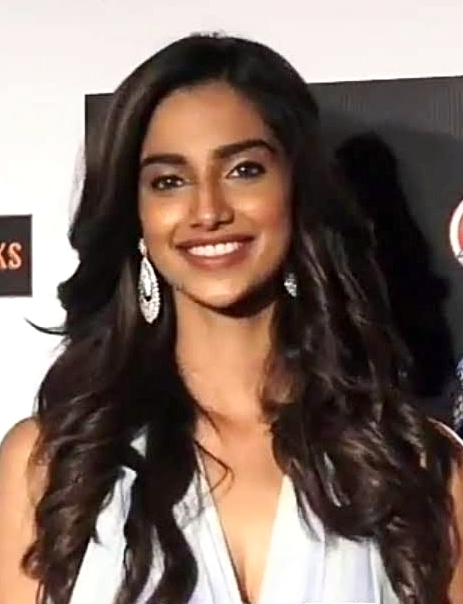
Chaudhary at an event in 2018

Chaudhary was named the Chandigarh Times Most Desirable Woman in 2018. In the same year, she was placed 2nd in the Times 50 Most Desirable Woman list.

== Filmography ==
Key
†	Denotes films that have not yet been released

=== Films ===
Year	Title	Role	Language	Notes	Ref.
2019	Upstarts	Veer's girlfriend	Hindi		
2021	Ichata Vahanamulu Niluparadu	Meenakshi "Meenu" Yadav	Telugu		
2022	Khiladi	Pooja Jayaram	Telugu		
2022	HIT: The Second Case	Aarya	Telugu		
2023	Kolai	Leila Borkar	Tamil		
2024	Guntur Kaaram	Raji	Telugu		
2024	Singapore Saloon	Nilavoliyal "Nila"	Tamil		
2024	The Greatest of All Time	Srinidhi Sunil	Tamil		
2024	Lucky Baskhar	Sumathi Kumar	Telugu		
2024	Matka	Sujatha	Telugu		
2024	Mechanic Rocky	Priya	Telugu		
2025	Sankranthiki Vasthunam	ACP C. Meenakshi "Meenu", IPS	Telugu		
2026	Anaganaga Oka Raju	Charulatha "Charu"	Telugu		
2026	Vrushakarma †	Daksha	Telugu	Filming	
2027	Karthi30 †	TBA	Tamil, Telugu	Filming	

=== Television ===
Year	Title	Role	Language	Notes	Ref.
2019–2021	Out of Love	Alia Kashyap Kapoor	Hindi	2 seasons	

=== Music videos ===
Year	Title	Singer	Language	Ref.
2018	"Ki Mai Kalli Aa"	Sara Gurpal	Punjabi	
2019	"Kyun"	Sushant Rinkoo	Hindi	
2025	"Sithira Puthiri"	Sai Abhyankkar	Tamil	

== Awards and nominations ==
Year	Award	Category	Film	Result	Ref.
2022	South Indian International Movie Awards	Best Female Debut – Telugu	Ichata Vahanamulu Niluparadu	Nominated	
2023	South Indian International Movie Awards	Best Actress – Telugu	HIT: The Second Case	Nominated	
2025	Filmfare Awards South	Lucky Baskhar	Best Actress – Telugu	Nominated	
2025	South Indian International Movie Awards	Lucky Baskhar	Best Actress – Telugu	Nominated	
2025	South Indian International Movie Awards	Lucky Baskhar	Best Actress Critics – Telugu	Won	

Awards and achievements
Preceded by Manushi Chhillar	Femina Miss Haryana; 2018	Succeeded by Sonal Sharma
Preceded by Anukriti Gusain	Miss Grand India; 2018	Succeeded by Shivani Jadhav
Preceded by (Venezuela) Tulia Alemán	Miss Grand International 1st Runner-up; 2018	Succeeded by (Mexico) María Malo
