= Awe (film) =

2018 film directed by Prasanth Varma

- Theatrical release poster
- Directed by: Prasanth Varma
- Written by: Prasanth Varma
- Produced by: Nani; Prashanti Tipirneni
- Starring: Kajal Aggarwal; Nithya Menen; Regina Cassandra; Eesha Rebba; Priyadarshi Pullikonda; Srinivas Avasarala; Murali Sharma
- Cinematography: Karthik Gattamneni
- Edited by: Goutham Nerusu
- Music by: Mark K. Robin
- Production company: Wall Poster Cinema
- Release date: 16 February 2018
- Running time: 110 minutes
- Country: India
- Language: Telugu
- Box office: ₹13.25 crore

Awe is a 2018 Indian Telugu-language psychological cross genre film written and directed by Prasanth Varma (in his feature debut). It is produced by Nani and Prashanti Tipirneni under their maiden production house Wall Poster Cinema. The film features an ensemble cast of Kajal Aggarwal, Nithya Menen, Regina Cassandra, Eesha Rebba, Srinivas Avasarala, Priyadarshi Pullikonda and Murali Sharma. It also features the voices of Nani and Ravi Teja. Awe deals with issues like child abuse, sexual abuse, lesbianism, and drug abuse.

The central plot of the film revolves around Kali (Kajal Aggarwal), and presents a complex narrative structure, weaving together six distinct yet interconnected stories that unfold simultaneously within the same restaurant. The interconnected stories involve various characters, each representing different facets of Kali's psyche due to her multiple personality disorder (MPD). The film's narrative reaches its resolution when all the characters, except Kali, are revealed to be split personalities of Kali, representing various traumatic phases of her life. The restaurant, a symbolic space, becomes the stage for the convergence of these identities. The film culminates in Kali shooting herself, resulting in the deaths of all the characters within the restaurant, signifying the end of her internal struggle.

The film was released worldwide on 16 February 2018 to positive reviews from critics and audiences and went on to become a commercial success at the box office. At the 66th National Film Awards, the film won the award for Best Special Effects, and Best Make-up.

== Plot ==
While working as a janitor, Shiva aspires to invent a time machine to meet his parents, whom he has never known. Parvathy, a wheelchair user, arrives and reveals herself to be Shiva's future self. She claims to have traveled back in time to prevent their parents' deaths, which are destined to occur within an hour. Elsewhere, Nala, a desperate job seeker, applies for a chef position at a restaurant owned by Chitra. Despite lacking culinary experience, he passes the cooking assessment by following YouTube video tutorials. He soon discovers that he can mysteriously hear and communicate with Nani, a goldfish, and Chanti, a bonsai tree inside the kitchen.

At the same restaurant, Radha dines with her parents and introduces her partner, Krish. Her parents are shocked to discover that Krish is a woman and that Radha is a lesbian. Although initially apposing their same-sex relationship, her parents soften after Krish, who is also a psychiatrist, reveals that Radha turned towards woman after enduring severe sexual abuse as a child. Meanwhile, Moksha, an eight-year-old girl managing the restaurant in her mother's absence, entertains customers with magic tricks. Yogi, an arrogant magician visiting the restaurant, conflicts with Moksha before being humbled in the restroom by an unseen entity representing God.

Mira, a drug-addicted barista, conspires with her boyfriend Sugar to steal cash from a wealthy investor visiting the venue. Mira uncovers a hidden necklace inside an indoor tree, which belongs to the deceased wife of a regular customer, Raghuram. Soon after, Mira encounters the ghost of Raghuram's late wife. Simultaneously, in an undisclosed location, a despondent woman named Kali signs an organ donation consent form and leaves a note declaring her intent to commit a mass murder while pleading not guilty.

Except for Kali's actions, all events unfold concurrently within the same restaurant. Sugar attempts to execute the robbery by having Mira cut the power, but a terrified Mira turns the lights back on due to the apparition, disrupting his plan. Shortly after, Moksha displays a magic trick to the investor, which allows Sugar to snatch the money from him. Catching Sugar in the act, the investor confronts him, prompting Sugar to grab Moksha as a hostage. Yogi uses magic tricks to disarm Sugar, allowing Krish to intervene, but the gun accidentally discharges and strikes Radha in the chest.

As Sugar attempts to flee, Nala knocks him unconscious with a stick after being urged by Nani. When Krish and Radha's parents prepare to rush Radha to a hospital, Parvathy orders Shiva to stop them, explaining that leaving the restaurant will trigger a butterfly effect causing their parents' deaths. Parvathy reveals that she repeatedly time-traveled to prevent anyone from exiting, but failed each time. Sudden tremors shake the restaurant, and the lights flicker uncontrollably.

Simultaneously, Kali shoots herself. It is revealed that Moksha, Radha, Mira, Krish, Nala, Shiva, Yogi, and Parvathy are alternate personalities existing within Kali's mind, each representing various traumatic stages of her life. As Kali dies by suicide to escape her mental illness, her internal personalities perish alongside her.

== Cast ==
- Kajal Aggarwal as Kali
- Nithya Menen as Krishnaveni aka Krish
- Regina Cassandra as Mira
- Eesha Rebba as Radha
- Priyadarshi Pullikonda as Nala Bheema
- Srinivas Avasarala as Shiva
- Murali Sharma as Yogi
- Kaitlyn "Kate" D'mello as Moksha
- Pragathi as Chithra
- Devadarshini as Parvathy
- Rohini as Radha's mother
- C. V. L. Narasimha Rao as Radha's father
- Jayasri Rachakonda as Devi
- Balakrishna as Raghuram
- Upen Reddy as Lobo/Sugar

Voice cast

- Nani as Nani, a goldfish
- Ravi Teja as Chanti, a bonsai tree

== Production ==
Nani met director Prasanth Varma who narrated the storyline to him. Nani reportedly loved the script and decided to produce the film himself. On 25 November 2017, the actor unveiled the title poster of the film at a star-studded event. The film was bankrolled by the actor's debut production house, Wallposter Cinema and co-produced by Prashanti Tipirneni, who worked as a costume designer for the Baahubali film series.

The film features an ensemble cast, which includes Kajal Aggarwal, Nithya Menen, Regina Cassandra, Eesha Rebba, Srinivas Avasarala, Murali Sharma, Priyadarshi Pullikonda, Rohini and Devadarshini. Nani voices a fish, who is one of the two voice-over narrators while Ravi Teja was brought in to play as the second of the two voice-over narrators, featuring as the voice of a bonsai.

While Karthik Ghattamaneni, Sahi Suresh and Gautham Nerusu were reported to be the cinematographer, art director and editor respectively. Newcomer Mark K Robin was hired to compose the score and songs.

== Themes ==
The film deals with mental illness, abuse, gender and sexuality. Kali (played by Kajal Aggarwal), is the main protagonist who is suffering from multiple personality disorder, at the end of the film. MPD is a mental illness characterized by alternating between multiple personality states and memory loss.

The concept of lesbianism portrayed in the film, became a popular topic since Telugu films were subjected to strict censor formalities while portraying lesbianism in films. Affair is the first Telugu film to portray lesbianism. However, it did not have a theatrical release, since the CBFC refused to approve the film. It was directly released on YouTube. The film was withdrawn and sent back to the Censor Board. But later it was released uncut. The Supreme Court of India invalidated part of Section 377 of the Indian Penal Code making homosexuality legal in India in September 2018.

In an interview with Haricharan Pudipeddi of Hindustan Times, Nithya Menen stated "When Prashant pitched the character, I was excited. As artists, we come across many stories but something like Awe doesn't come often; it's rare. I didn't see it as a lesbian character. I accepted the offer because I thought it'd be exciting and challenging. I love doing different, edgy roles."

== Music ==
The film score and soundtrack were composed by newcomer Mark K Robin. Initially, the film features only one song titled "Theme of Awe" which was played in the opening and end credits of the film. The song was digitally released in YouTube and other streaming platforms on 9 February 2018, while it was launched at the Radio Mirchi FM Station in Hyderabad on 13 February 2018, in the presence of the film's cast and crew. Sung by Sharon, with lyrics written by Krishna Kanth, The Times of India stated that "The song is tailor made for the movie." Lahari Music released the opening credits and ending credits video on 30 June and 1 July respectively, which features the theme song. Both the videos were released on two different YouTube channels.

== Marketing ==
The pre-release event took place at B. R. Ambedkar University Grounds at Hyderabad on 31 January 2018, where the film's trailer was released and received positive responses.

== Release and reception ==
=== Theatrical release ===
Awe was released worldwide on 16 February 2018. The film was premiered exclusively in the United States, a day before its original release, on 15 February 2018.

=== Reception ===
On the review aggregator website Rotten Tomatoes, 100% of 5 critics' reviews are positive, with an average rating of 8/10.

Neetishta Nyayapati, from The Times of India, rated 4 out of 5 stars, and stated that "Go watch this film if you're looking for something definitely out of the box and fresh, 'Awe' will not disappoint you." The Indian Express gave it 4 stars stating that "Awe has high entertainment value, strong emotions, progressive characters, thrills, chills, comedy and some philosophy. Prasanth could have even made this film work without big actors or fancy sets in it." Hindustan Times rated the film 5/5, summarising that the film is "technically brilliant".

India Today rated 3 out of 5 stars, stating that "Awe has several astonishing moments only if you can look past the sequences that are not in sync with the story." Behindwoods rated 3 out of 5, stating it as "a welcome trendsetter" Deccan Chronicle rated 4 out of 5 stars, and summarised that "The narration is slow and be careful… If you do not understand the climax, you do not understand the film. The film's key point is the last 15 minutes in which the director very cleverly reveals the connection between the characters. Prashanth Varma has tried something different here. People, who are on the lookout for a new genre cinema, should watch this film definitely." Baradwaj Rangan of Film Companion South wrote "Awe certainly leaves you thinking – about the film itself, and about what an exciting time it is in Telugu cinema, with so many rebels plotting these little coups against one of the country's most deeply entrenched cinematic empires."

In a contrast review, Firstpost rated 3 out of 5 and stated that "The moment you figure out an answer, you will know whether Awe! is 'Awesome' or 'Awful'. The truth lies somewhere in between." Indiaglitz rated 2.75/5, and gave a verdict: "AWE is a crafty anthology movie which relies too heavily on the strength of its climax. Too psychological, too poetic at times. The lengthiness of many scenes makes one say, 'It's more of the same'. Genre shifts were an oversold idea. The performances are praiseworthy. Technical departments put up a solid show." Sify rated 2.5 out of 5 stars, stating that "Awe is psychological thriller of a traumatized woman told in episodic stories. There are many individual episodes that are strangely funny but the overall drama seems too far-fetched. The final twist in the tale is unconvincing. Second half is mostly bore."

== Legacy ==
Celebrities such as actors Rahul Ravindran, Anupama Parameswaran, Adivi Sesh, Vennela Kishore, Shashank, director Madhura Sreedhar Reddy, producer Shobu Yarlagadda and costume designer Neeraja Kona, praised Nani and Prashanth Varma for the latter's scripting and direction and the former's production values. The film was presented at the World Congress of Psychiatry in Mexico, by an Indian medical student from the US who presented at the conference as "Dissociative Identity Disorder in Indian Cinema."
