= List of Telugu films of 2026 =

This is a list of Telugu-language films produced in Telugu cinema in India that are released/scheduled to be released in the year 2026.

== Box office collection ==
The List of highest-grossing Telugu films released in 2026, by worldwide box office gross revenue, are as follows: The rank of the films in the following table depends on the estimate of worldwide collections as reported by organizations classified as green by Wikipedia. (Note: See WP:RSP, WP:ICTFSOURCES) There is no official tracking of domestic box office figures within India.

Background shading indicates that a film is currently showing in theatres worldwide.

Highest worldwide gross of 2026
Rank	Title	Production company	Worldwide gross	Ref.
1	Peddi	Vriddhi Cinemas	₹330–336.85 crore	(Note: Peddi's reported worldwide grosses vary between ₹330 crore (Deccan Herald, Cinema Express) – ₹336.85 crore (Outlook India))
2	Mana Shankara Vara Prasad Garu	Shine Screens / Gold Box Entertainments	₹300–310 crore	(Note: Mana Shankara Vara Prasad Garu's reported worldwide grosses vary between ₹300 crore (Filmfare, The Week) – ₹310 crore (Deccan Chronicle))
3	Irumudi	Mythri Movie Makers	₹244.97–251.25 crore	(Note: Irumudi's reported worldwide grosses vary between ₹244.97 crore (Hindustan Times) – ₹251.25 crore (Zoom TV))
4	The RajaSaab	People Media Factory	₹208.38 crore	
5	The Paradise	SLV Cinemas	₹169 crore	
6	Anaganaga Oka Raju	Sithara Entertainments / Fortune Four Cinemas	₹100.20 crore	
7	Maa Inti Bangaaram	Tralala Moving Pictures	₹100 crore	(Note: (India Today), (India TV News))
8	Ustaad Bhagat Singh	Mythri Movie Makers	₹95 crore	
9	Ranabaali	Mythri Movie Makers	₹80–81.10 crore	
10	Aadarsha Kutumbam House No: 47 - AK47	Haarika and Hassine Creations	₹74.35 crore	

== January–March ==
Opening		Title	Director	Cast	Production company	Ref.
J A N U A R Y	1	Psych Siddhartha	Varun Reddy	Nandu, Yamini Bhaskar	Spirit Media / Nanduness / Keep Rolling Pictures	
J A N U A R Y	1	Madham	Vamsee Krishna Malla	Harsha Gangavarapu, Anuroop Katari, Inaya Sulthana	Ekaiva Homes Pvt. Ltd	
J A N U A R Y	1	Sahakutumbaanaam	Uday Sharma	Raam Kiran, Megha Akash	HNG Cinemas LLP	
J A N U A R Y	1	Vanaveera	Avinash Thiruveedhula	Avinash Thiruveedhula, Simran Choudhary, Nandu	Silver Screen Cinemas LLP	
J A N U A R Y	2	Ghantasala: The Great	Ch. Rama Rao	Krishna Chaitanya, Mrudula Iyengar, Suman	Anyukth Ram Pictures	
J A N U A R Y	2	Nilakanta	Rakesh Madhavan	Master Mahendran, Yashna Muthuluri, Anil Inamadugu	RK Productions	
J A N U A R Y	9	The RajaSaab	Maruthi	Prabhas, Nidhhi Agerwal, Sanjay Dutt	People Media Factory	
J A N U A R Y	9	Silent Screams	Arvind Menon	Shruti Haasan (voice only)	Sun NXT	
J A N U A R Y	12	Mana Shankara Vara Prasad Garu	Anil Ravipudi	Chiranjeevi, Nayanthara, Venkatesh	Shine Screens / Gold Box Entertainments	
J A N U A R Y	13	Bhartha Mahasayulaku Wignyapthi	Kishore Tirumala	Ravi Teja, Ashika Ranganath, Dimple Hayathi	SLV Cinemas	
J A N U A R Y	14	Anaganaga Oka Raju	Maari	Naveen Polishetty, Meenakshi Chaudhary	Sithara Entertainments / Fortune Four Cinemas	
J A N U A R Y	14	Nari Nari Naduma Murari	Ram Abbaraju	Sharwanand, Samyuktha, Sakshi Vaidya	AK Entertainments / Adventures International Pvt Ltd	
J A N U A R Y	23	Cheekatilo	Sharan Koppisetty	Sobhita Dhulipala, Vishwadev Rachakonda	Suresh Productions / Amazon Prime Video	
J A N U A R Y	30	Devagudi	Bellam Ramakrishna Reddy	Raghu Kunche, Abhinav Saurya, Anushree	Pushyami Film Makers	
J A N U A R Y	30	Dhrutarashtrudu	Suresh Gomathi	Dhanraj Koranani, Nene Shekar	Geetha Sree Arts	
J A N U A R Y	30	Om Shanti Shanti Shantihi	A R Sajeev	Tharun Bhascker, Eesha Rebba	S Originals / MovieVerse Studios	
J A N U A R Y	30	Jagannath	Bharath Santhosh	Bharath Peelam, Nitya Sri, Saara Achar	Bharath Film Factory	
J A N U A R Y	30	Trimukha	Razesh Naidu	Akriti Agarwal, Sunny Leone, Sahithi Dasari, Yogesh Kalle	Akhira Dream Creations	
J A N U A R Y	30	Zamana	Bhaskar Jakkula	Surya Srinivas, Sanjeev, Swathi	Sri Lakshmivallabha Creations	
F E B R U A R Y	6	Barabar Premistha	Sampath Rudra	Chandra Hass, Megna Mukharjee, Arjun Mahi	CC Creations / AVR Movie Wonders	
F E B R U A R Y	6	Blood Roses	Mandati Guru Rajan	Dharma Keerthiraj, Apsara Rani, Sreelu, Killi Kranthi	TBR Cine Creations	
F E B R U A R Y	6	Dakshina Kali	Thota Krishna	Archana Shastry, Chandragiri Subbu, Priyanka Sree	Sreenidhi Creations	
F E B R U A R Y	6	Erracheera	Ch Suman Babu	Sriram, Ajay, Baby Sai Tejaswini	Sri Padmalaya Entertainments / Sri Suman Venkatadri Productions	
F E B R U A R Y	6	Euphoria	Gunasekhar	Bhumika Chawla, Sara Arjun, Vignesh Gavireddy	Guna Handmade Films	
F E B R U A R Y	6	Honey	Karuna Kumar	Naveen Chandra, Divya Pillai, Divi Vadthya	Ova Entertainments	
F E B R U A R Y	6	Laggam Time	Prajoth K Vennam	Rajesh Meru, Navya Chityala, Sudharshan	20th Century Entertainments	
F E B R U A R Y	6	Operation Padma	Karthikeya V	Naresh Medi, Rajitha Sandy, Ranadheer Beesu	Krishav Cinemas / KVM Arts LLP	
F E B R U A R Y	6	Sri Chidambaram Garu	Vinay Ratnam	Vamsi Tummala, Sandhya Vasishta, Kalpa Latha	Srichakraas Entertainments	
F E B R U A R Y	6	Sumathi Sathakam	M. M. Nayudu	Amardeep Chowdary, Sayli M Chaudhari	Vision Movie Makers	
F E B R U A R Y	13	1+1 Offer	Amrutha Puri Sriram	Nimmala Sreeram, Mounika Reddy, Rajesh Bhupathi	Triveni Pictures	
F E B R U A R Y	13	Amaravathiki Aahvanam	GVK	Ester Noronha, Dhanya Balakrishna, Supritha, Siva Kantamaneni	Light House Cine Magic	
F E B R U A R Y	13	Funky	K. V. Anudeep	Vishwak Sen, Kayadu Lohar	Sithara Entertainments / Fortune Four Cinemas	
F E B R U A R Y	13	Nilave	Sowmith Poladi–Sai K Vennam	Sowmith Poladi, Shreyasi Sen, Harsha Chemudu	Point Of View Films	
F E B R U A R Y	13	Sky	Pridhvi Pericherla	Murali Krishnam Raju, Shruti Shetty, Anand Bharathi	Valour Entertainment Studios	
F E B R U A R Y	14	Couple Friendly	Ashwin Chandrasekar	Santosh Sobhan, Manasa Varanasi	VR Global Media / UV Concepts	
F E B R U A R Y	14	Seetha Payanam	Arjun Sarja	Niranjan Sudhindra, Aishwarya Arjun	Sree Raam Films International	
F E B R U A R Y	20	Hey Balwanth	Gopi Atchara	Suhas, Shivani Nagaram, Naresh	Trishul Visionary Studios	
F E B R U A R Y	20	Nawab Cafe	Pramod Harsha	Shiva Kandukuri, Rajeev Kanakala, Teju Ashwini	Harshika Productions	
F E B R U A R Y	20	Trishanku	Srikrishna Gorle	Aman, Prachi Tehlan, Suman, Rashmi Gautam	Ganesh Creations / U&I Entertainments	
F E B R U A R Y	27	Son Of	Bathula Sateesh	Sai Simhadri, Vinod Kumar, Vasu Inturi	Sai Simhadri Sainma	
F E B R U A R Y	27	Uttutta Herolu	Harsha Kodali	Mahesh Vitta, Praveena Soni, Waltair Vinay	MVM Pictures	
F E B R U A R Y	27	Vishnu Vinyasam	Yadunaath Maruthi Rao	Sree Vishnu, Nayan Sarika	Sree Subrahmanyeshwara Cinemas	
M A R C H	6	Mension House Mallesh	Bala Satish	Srinath Maganti, Gayathri Ramana, Kamakshi Bhaskarla	Kanakamedala Productions	
M A R C H	6	Mrithyunjay	Hussain Sha Kiran	Sree Vishnu, Reba Monica John	Light Box Media / Picture Perfect Entertainment	
M A R C H	6	Sampradayini Suppini Suddapoosani	Sudheer Sriram	Sivaji, Laya, Rohan Roy	Sree Sivaji Productions / ETV Win	
M A R C H	6	S Saraswathi	Varalaxmi Sarathkumar	Varalaxmi Sarathkumar, Prakash Raj, Priyamani	Dosa Diaries LLP	
M A R C H	14	Repu Udayam 10 Gantalaku	Chendu Muddu	Abhinav Gomatam, Hebah Patel, Chaitanya Rao	Mango Mass Media	
M A R C H	19	Ustaad Bhagat Singh	Harish Shankar	Pawan Kalyan, Sreeleela, Raashii Khanna	Mythri Movie Makers	
M A R C H	26	Band Melam	Sathish Javvaji	Harsh Roshan, Sridevi Apalla	Kona Film Corporation	
M A R C H	26	Lechindi Mahila Lokam	Arjun–Carthyk	Lakshmi Manchu, Sreerama Chandra, Ananya Nagalla	Brihaspathi Entertainments / Apparently Cinema / Story Factory	
M A R C H	27	Suyodhana	Y. S Madav Reddy	Priyadarshi Pulikonda, Drishika Chander	Prajwalaa Line Creations	

== April–June ==
Opening		Title	Director	Cast	Production company	Ref.
A P R I L	3	Biker	Abhilash Reddy	Sharwanand, Rajasekhar, Malvika Nair	UV Creations	
A P R I L	3	Raakaasa	Manasa Sharma	Sangeeth Sobhan, Nayan Sarika	Pink Elephant Pictures / Zee Studios	
A P R I L	3	Suvarna	Ashok Royya	Pallavi, Shakalaka Shankar	Aradhya Creations	
A P R I L	10	Dacoit: A Love Story (Note: The film was produced in both Telugu and Hindi simultaneously.)	Shaneil Deo	Adivi Sesh, Mrunal Thakur, Anurag Kashyap	S. S. Creations / Suniel Narang Productions	
A P R I L	10	Diamond Dacoit	Surya G Yadav	Muni Gopal Yadav, Meghana Reddy	TCM Production	
A P R I L	17	Bad Boy Karthik	Ramesh Desina	Naga Shaurya, Sridevi Vijaykumar, Vidhi Yadav	Sri Vaishnavi Films	
A P R I L	17	Gaali	T. Ramu	Chanda Roja Rani	Sandhya Films	
A P R I L	17	Papam Prathap	S. P. Durga Naresh	Thiruveer, Payal Radhakrishna	Krishi Entertainments / ETV Win	
A P R I L	17	Therachaapa	Joel George	Naveenraj Sankarapu, Pooja Suhasini, Sreelu Dasari	Ananya Creations	
A P R I L	17	Thimmarajupalli TV	V. Muniraju	Sai Tej, Vedha Jallandar, Pradeep Kotte	KA Productions / Sumaira Studios	
A P R I L	23	Rich Kid	Shafi and Anil	Manjunath Reddy, Supriya, Rajasekhar Aningi	Sree Manjunatha Cinemas	
A P R I L	24	Gedela Raju Kakinada Taluka	Chaitanya Moturi	Raghu Kunche, Vikas Muppala, Teena Sravya	Moturi Talkies	
A P R I L	24	Paramapadha Sopanam	Naga Shiva	Ambati Arjun, Jenifer Emmanuel	Swayambhu Creations	
A P R I L	24	Sugriva	Narthu Chiranjeevi	Balu Charan, Kajal Tiwari, Suman Setty, Karan Vijay	SGSV Movies	
M A Y	1	Gaayapadda Simham	Kasyap Sreenivas	Tharun Bhascker, Faria Abdullah, J. D. Chakravarthy	Sapta Aswa Media Works / Zee Studios / POV Stories	
M A Y	1	Jetlee	Ritesh Rana	Satya, Rhea Singha, Vennela Kishore	Clap Entertainment	
M A Y	8	Godari Gattupaina	Subash Chandra	Sumanth Prabhas, Nidhi Pradeep, Jagapathi Babu	Red Puppet Productions	
M A Y	8	M4M: Motive for Murder	Mohan Vadlapatla	Sambeet Acharya, Jo Sharma, Sudhakar, Satya Krishnan	Mohan Media Creations	
M A Y	8	Razor	Ravi Babu	Ravi Babu	Flying Frogs	
M A Y	8	Sathi Leelavathi	Tatineni Satya	Lavanya Tripathi, Dev Mohan	Durga Devi Pictures	
M A Y	8	Vidhi Geesina V Chitram	Srinivas Markandeya	Srinivas Markandeya, Prashanthi, Narendra Gullapalli	Magnus Cineprime Pvt. Ltd.	
M A Y	15	Arey Apandra	T. Saikrishna	T. Saikrishna, Sonakshi Varma, Sudharshan	Creative Thinks Gang / Sri Annapurna Creations	
M A Y	15	Dooradarshini	Karthikeya Kommi	Suvixith Bojja, Geethika Ratan, Bhadram	Varaha Movie Makers	
M A Y	15	Harudu	Raj Thalluri	Venkat, Hebah Patel, Saloni Aswani	V R Entertainments	
M A Y	15	Mr. Work from Home	Madhudeep Chelikaani	Thrigun, Payal Radhakrishna	Lotus Creative Works	
M A Y	22	First Time	Hemanth Iippalapalli	Saurabh Dhingra, Akhil Sarthak, Anicka Vikramann	Hemnath Arts	
M A Y	22	Purushaha	Veeru Vulavala	Pavan Kalyan Battula, Saptagiri, Rajkumar Kasireddy	Kalyan Productions	
M A Y	22	Ramani Kalyanam	Vijay Adireddy	Surya Vashistta, Deepshikha Chandran	Kites Creatives	
M A Y	22	Ugly Story	Pranava Swaroop	Nandu, Avika Gor	Riya Jiya Productions	
M A Y	28	Trikala	Mani Thellagutie	Ajay, Shraddha Das, Mahendran, Tanikella Bharani, Aamani	Chaganti Productions LLP	
M A Y	29	Mareechika	Satish Kasetty	Viraj Ashwin, Regena Cassandrra, Anupama Parameswaran	Chilaka Productions	
M A Y	29	Sandigdham	Parda Saradhi Kommoju	Nihal Kumar, Priya Deshpag, Arjun Dev, Kajal Tiwari, Jeeva	Thirdha Creations	
J U N E	4	Peddi	Buchi Babu Sana	Ram Charan, Janhvi Kapoor, Shiva Rajkumar, Jagapathi Babu	Vriddhi Cinemas	
J U N E	12	Kotha Malupu	Siva Vara Prasad K	Akash Goparaju, Bhairavi Ardhya	Tathasthu Creations	
J U N E	12	Police Complaint (Note: The film was shot in both Telugu and Kannada simultaneously.)	Sanjeev Megoti	Varalaxmi Sarathkumar, Naveen Chandra, Ragini Dwivedi	MSK Pramidha Shee Films	
J U N E	12	Sing Geetham	Singeetam Srinivasa Rao	Ayaan, Ahilya Bamroo, Shalini Kondepudi	Vyjayanthi Movies / Swapna Cinema	
J U N E	19	Deewana	Sreekanth Sangishetty	Harshith Reddy, Smeha Manimegalai	Arha Media / V Studios	
J U N E	19	LGBT: A Legal Battle	P. Suneel Kumar Reddy	Hima Rathod, L. B. Sriram, Ester Noronha	Sravya Films	
J U N E	19	Maa Inti Bangaaram	B. V. Nandini Reddy	Samantha, Gulshan Devaiah, Sreemukhi	Tralala Moving Pictures	
J U N E	19	Transfer Trimurthulu	Kamal Teja Narla	Vadde Naveen, Rashi Singh	Vadde Creations LLP	
J U N E	26	Risk	Gantadi Krishna	Sandeep Ashwa, Sanya Thakur, Rajeev Kanakala	GK Miracles	
J U N E	26	Gossip	Vaibhav Koundinya	Rashi Singh, Ravi Varma, Vijay Adhiraj	Ybhav Cinesculpt Studios	

== July–September ==
Opening		Title	Director	Cast	Production company	Ref.
J U L Y	3	Nagabandham: The Secret Treasure	Abhishek Nama	Virat Karrna, Nabha Natesh, Iswarya Menon, Jagapathi Babu	NIK Studios / Abhishek Pictures	
J U L Y	3	Rao Bahadur	Venkatesh Maha	Satyadev, Vikas Muppala, Deepa Thomas, Bala Parasar	Srichakraas Entertainments / A+S Movies / Mahayana Motion Pictures / Better Invest Media Vision Fund	
J U L Y	10	Lenin	Murali Kishor Abburu	Akhil Akkineni, Bhagyashri Borse, Sivaji	Manam Enterprises LLP / Sithara Entertainments	
J U L Y	10	Vasudheva Sutham	Vykunt Bonu	Mahendran, Ambika Vvani, John Vijay, Rajeev Kanakala	Rainbow Cinemas	
J U L Y	17	Mister Middle Class	G. Nageswara Reddy	Srikanth, Laya, Rajendra Prasad	Blu.J Creations	
J U L Y	17	MRP (Neekentha Naakentha)	Shravan Jesta	Naresh Agastya, Sudharshan, Rajkumar Kasireddy	Panchajanya Features	
J U L Y	17	Oh..! Sukumari	Bharat Dharshan	Thiruveer, Aishwarya Rajesh	Gangaa Entertainments	
J U L Y	17	Oka Court Case	Ganesh Pudi	Suryaansh Ayila, Tanisha Mishra, Prudhvi Raj, Satya Krishnan	Open Eyes Entertainment	
J U L Y	17	Operation Aruna Reddy	Posani Krishna Murali	Posani Krishna Murali, Hindola Chakravarthy, Ayesh Banu	UP Cinema Lines / Kusuma Entertainment	
J U L Y	17	Raja The Raja	Annil Boyiidapu	Ruthvik Kondakindi, Vishakha Dhiman, Naresh, P. Sai Kumar	Vrindavan Creations	
J U L Y	17	Vadala	Akella V Krishna	Jagapathi Babu, Laya and Hrithika Srinivas	Charita Chitra	
J U L Y	17	Venkatramaiah Gari Taluka	Sateesh Avala	Dinesh, Divija Prabhakar, Sudha, Muralidhar Goud	Komali Creations	
J U L Y	24	Chennai Love Story	Ravi Namburii	Kiran Abbavaram, Sri Gouri Priya	Mass Movie Makers / Amrutha Productions	
J U L Y	30	Srinivasa Mangapuram	Ajay Bhupathi	Jaya Krishna Ghattamaneni, Rasha Thadani	Chandamama Kathalu Pictures	
J U L Y	31	Adhey Neevu Adhey Nenu	Kondalarao Yellaboina	Trinadh Varma, Yashwanth Pendyala, Tanvi Negi, Kalpa Latha	Sri Lakshmi Veerabhadra Creations	
J U L Y	31	Karmakhya	Abhinaya Krishna	Samaira Sri, P. Samuthirakani, Abhirami, Sharanya Pradeep	My Film Productions	
J U L Y	31	Newton's 3rd Law	Rajesh Karna	Sumanth, Jagapathi Babu, Trinadh Varma	ETV Win / Marks My Words Entertainment	
A U G U S T	7	Amma Naaku Aa Abbayi Kaavali	Siva Prabhakar	Pawan Mahaveer, Varshika Pasam, Suhana	GSR Movie Makers	
A U G U S T	7	Korean Kanakaraju	Merlapaka Gandhi	Varun Tej, Ritika Nayak, Satya	UV Creations / First Frame Entertainments	
A U G U S T	7	KJQ: King Jackie Queen	Kiran Kumar	Dheekshith Shetty, Shashi Odela, Yukti Thareja	SLV Cinemas	
A U G U S T	14	Agadha	M. S. Raju	Kamakshi Bhaskarla, Shravan Reddy, Ulka Gupta	Sri Adi Varaha Productions	
A U G U S T	14	Pallaburusu	Uday Chauhan	Sudhakar Reddy, Muralidhar Goud	Annapurna Studios / EPIC Studios	
A U G U S T	14	Panchali Panchabhartruka	Ganga Sapthasikhara	Rajendra Prasad, Roll Rida, Raj Pavan, Gemini Suresh	Royal Throne Productions / Om Sairam Art	
A U G U S T	15	Hushar Pittalu	Bikshu	Vasavi Ganeshan, Ansh Thorat, Govardhan, Sunitha Manohar	Rudra Kranthi Pictures	
A U G U S T	21	Ameer Log	Ramana Reddy Soma	Hari Munnangi, Sasidhar Kocharlakota, Manoj,	Awwal Number Productions	
A U G U S T	21	Irumudi	Shiva Nirvana	Ravi Teja, Priya Bhavani Shankar, P. Sai Kumar, Nakshathra	Mythri Movie Makers	
S E P T E M B E R	3	Romanchakam	Venu Gopal Reddy	Sumanth Prabhas, Ananthika Sanilkumar	Bhadrakali Pictures	
S E P T E M B E R	4	Sahaa: Life of Sanju	Nishanth Doti	Shiva Kumar Kasaram, Swetha Lakshman, Vrajana Pandya	Sumaira Studios	
S E P T E M B E R	4	Rambha Urvasi Menaka	Chandra Mohan Chintada	Allari Naresh, Surbhi, Vennela Kishore, Srinivasa Reddy	Hasya Movies / Annapurna Studios	
S E P T E M B E R	4	Dharmasthala Niyojakavargam	Jai Jnana Prabha Thota	Suman, P. Sai Kumar, Vithika Sheru, Kasthuri Shankar, Rajeev Kanakala	Moving Dreams India Private Limited	
S E P T E M B E R	10	Maremma	Manchala Nagaraj	Maadhav Bhupathiraju, Deepa Balu	Moksha Arts	
S E P T E M B E R	11	Epic	Aditya Haasan	Anand Deverakonda, Vaishnavi Chaitanya	Sithara Entertainments / Fortune Four Cinemas / 360 Film Services	
S E P T E M B E R	11	Telanganawala	Shalini Kondepudi	Vinay, Yamini Bandaru,Uma Neha	Priya Film Makers	
S E P T E M B E R	18	Ee Paata Korinavaaru	Chandra Siddhartha	Harsha, Ravi Varma, Ammayra Gowswami, Sujana Reddy	Filmotsav	
S E P T E M B E R	18	Happy Journey	Abhiramm Naidu	Annapurna, Aamani, Jhansi, Vamsidhar Kosgi	Gutta Productions	
S E P T E M B E R	18	Missing Meghana	Vachaspathy	Ram Karthik, Ammu Abhirami, Vaidika Senjaliya, Ankith Koyya	First Copy Movies	
S E P T E M B E R	18	Secret Soldier	Akki Viswanadha Reddy	Nihal Kodhaty, Surya Srinivas, Harshitha Bandlamuri	Moon Light Dreams Pvt Ltd	
S E P T E M B E R	24	The Paradise	Srikanth Odela	Nani, Mohan Babu, Raghav Juyal, Kayadu Lohar	SLV Cinemas	
S E P T E M B E R	25	Anumana Pakshi	Vimal Krishna	Rag Mayur, Merin Philip, Prince Cecil	Chilaka Productions	

== October–December ==
Opening		Title	Director	Cast	Production company	Ref.
O C T O B E R	2	Anakapalli	Khagesh Tammineni	Vikram Sahidev, Sandhya Vasishta, Tarak Ponnappa	Bhavya Sri Movie Makers / Nakkina Narratives	
O C T O B E R	2	Don't Trouble the Trouble	Shashank Yeleti	Fahadh Faasil, Saurabh Sachdeva, Ssara Palekar	Showing Business / Arka Media Works	
O C T O B E R	2	Impure	Nishanthi Evani	Varahi Mallipamula, Yashna Muthuluri, Sai Krishna	Vah Matcha	
O C T O B E R	2	Rupayanamaha	T. Arvind Reddy	Aravind Pandrate, Venu Polsani, Krack Srimani, D Anudeep	Chitraveda Productions	
O C T O B E R	2	SI Yugandhar	Raghavendra Katari	Aadi Saikumar, Megha Lekha, Rakendu Mouli	Sri Pinaaka Motion Pictures	
O C T O B E R	2	Tatvam	Arjun Kola	Dinesh Tej, Dhasvika Kinthalli	SK Productions / Trayathi Ishani Creations	
O C T O B E R	2	Thellakaagitham	Ramesh Bandreddi	Harsh Roshan, Nakshatra	Arunachala Creations	
O C T O B E R	9	Baa Baa Black Sheep	Guni Manchikanti	Akshay Lagusani, Vismaya Sri, Vishnu Oi, Upendra Limaye	Chitralayam Studios	
O C T O B E R	9	Chakkora	Manga Srinivas	Sravan, Malaika Vasupal, L. B. Sriram, Suman	High Joy Commercials	
O C T O B E R	9	Comrade Kalyan	Janakiram Marella	Sree Vishnu, Mahima Nambiar, Shine Tom Chacko	Skanda Vahana Motion Pictures LLP / Kona Film Corporation	
O C T O B E R	9	Good Time	Chanakya Jilla	Nikhil Gajula, Anyuktha Nallani, Soundharya Lahari, M.C. Hari	Movie Brats	
O C T O B E R	9	Mayookha	Shree Tej SK	Payal Chengappa, Dev Shashank D, Muralidhar Goud	CinemaBandi Productions / Prashvitha Entertainment	
O C T O B E R	16	Ranabaali	Rahul Sankrityan	Vijay Deverakonda, Rashmika Mandanna, Arnold Vosloo	Mythri Movie Makers	
O C T O B E R	17	Crazy Kalyanam	Badrappa Gajula	Anupama Parameswaran, Tharun Bhascker, Naresh, Akhil Raj	Arrow Cinemas	
O C T O B E R	17	Garividi Lakshmi	Gowri Naidu Jammu	Anandhi, Rag Mayur, Naresh, Raasi	People Media Factory	
O C T O B E R	22	Naa Wife Missing	Swathi Prakash Matripragada	Varun Sandesh, Shweta Basu Prasad	Aha	
O C T O B E R	23	321	Shanthikumar Chilumula	Mohit Pedada, Lavanya, Vivan Surya, Lakshmi, Yamini	Brahma Art Creations	
O C T O B E R	23	418	Kirtan Nadagouda	Chaithra J Achar, Surya, Charan Lakkaraju, Preethi Pagadala	Mythri Movie Makers	
O C T O B E R	24	Jayaho Ramanuja	Lion Sai Venkat	Lion Sai Venkat, Jo Sharma, Suman	Sudarshanam Productions	
O C T O B E R	30	Aadarsha Kutumbam House No: 47 - AK47	Trivikram Srinivas	Venkatesh, Srinidhi Shetty, Nara Rohith	Haarika & Hassine Creations	
O C T O B E R	30	Cult	Vishwak Sen	Vishwak Sen, Gayatri Bhardwaj, Tarak Ponnappa	Tarak Cinemas LLP / Vanmaye Creations	
O C T O B E R	30	Killer	Suku Poorvaaj	Jyoti Poorvaj, Suku Poorvaaj, Manish Gilada, Chandra Kanth	Think Cinema	
N O V E M B E R	6	Summer Holidays	Srikar Nayan G	Rohan Roy, Arun Dev Pothula, Khushi, Jaya Sudha	Dheeraj Mogilineni Entertainments / VGB Films	
N O V E M B E R	12	G.O.A.T	Vedavyas	Sudigali Sudheer, Divyabharathi	Mahateja Creations	
N O V E M B E R	13	Chandrayan	Srinath Chandrashekar	Shiva Kumar, Swapna Priyadarahini, Ravi Siva Teja	Simba Screen Stories	
N O V E M B E R	13	Dark Chocolate	Shashank Srivatsavaya	Vishwadev Rachakonda, Bindu Madhavi, Rakesh Rachakonda	Waltair Productions	
N O V E M B E R	13	DNK: Donga Naa Koduku	Sreenu Kambala	Mouli Tanuj Prasanth, Sushmitha Shetty	Mythri Movie Makers	
N O V E M B E R	13	Maya Lady	Prasankar	Rakesh Varre, Madhumita Sarcar	Crazy Ants Productions	
N O V E M B E R	13	Itllu Arjuna	Mahesh Uppala	Aniesh Reddy, Anaswara Rajan	What Next Entertainments	
N O V E M B E R	14	Jayannth & the Jingo Pen	Naveen Deshaboina	Jayannth, Uha Reddy, Satyam Rajesh, Tanikella Bharani	Namo Jayam Productions	
N O V E M B E R	19	ENE Repeat	Tharun Bhascker	Vishwak Sen, Abhinav Gomatam, Srinath Maganti, Venkatesh	SS Originals / Rootnode Cinema	
N O V E M B E R	20	Aakasamlo Oka Tara	Pavan Sadineni	Dulquer Salmaan, Satvika Veeravalli, Shruti Haasan	Swapna Cinema / Lightbox Media / Geetha Arts	
N O V E M B E R	20	Mana Doctor Babe	Chalapathy Puvvala	Sri Skanda, Mohana Siddhi, Rajeev Kanakala, Ali	Skanda Films	
N O V E M B E R	27	Mysaa	Rawindra Pulle	Rashmika Mandanna, Guru Somasundaram, P. Samuthirakani	UnFormula Films	
N O V E M B E R	27	Haindava	Ludheer Byreddy	Bellamkonda Sai Sreenivas, Samyuktha, J. D. Chakravarthy	Moonshine Pictures	
N O V E M B E R	27	High	S. Krishna	Ananya Sharma, S. Krishna, Pallavi Dora, Krishna Kamal	Imagespark Entertainment, Myra Creations	
D E C E M B E R	4	Alias Rukmini	Murali Kanth Devasoth	Nithiin, Aafiya Sayed	Unanimous Productions	
D E C E M B E R	4	Legacy	Saikiran Reddy Daida	Vishwak Sen, Ekta Rathod, Kushee Ravi, Kay Kay Menon	Kalaahi Media	
D E C E M B E R	4	Vrushakarma	Karthik Varma Dandu	Naga Chaitanya, Meenakshi Chaudhary, Sparsh Shrivastava	Sri Venkateswara Cine Chitra / Sukumar Writings	
D E C E M B E R	11	Pocket Rockkets	Rudra Atri	Trinadh Varma, Nirmal, Shriya Kontham, J. D. Chakravarthy	Pink Elephant Pictures / Maximum City Studios	
D E C E M B E R	18	Alcohol	Meher Tej	Allari Naresh, Ruhani Sharma, Niharika NM	Sithara Entertainments / Fortune Four Cinemas	
D E C E M B E R	24	Dada	Gopichand Malineni	Nandamuri Balakrishna, Kajal Aggarwal, Manchu Manoj	Vriddhi Cinemas	
D E C E M B E R	24	King 100	Ra. Karthik	Nagarjuna, Tabu, Ashok Selvan, Sushmitha Bhat, Aishwarya Rajesh	Annapurna Studios / Manam Enterprises	
D E C E M B E R	25	Reality	Kiran Abbavaram	Kiran Abbavaram, Devika Bhat, P. Sai Kumar	Joy Films	

== See also ==
- List of Telugu films of 2025
- Lists of Telugu-language films
- List of Telugu films of 2027
