= Mamidipally, Ranga Reddy district =

Mamidipally
- Village
- Country: India
- State: Telangana

Languages
  - Official: Telugu
- Time zone: UTC+5:30 (IST)
- Telephone code: 040
- Vehicle registration: TS-26 X XXXX
- Sex ratio: 1:1(approx) ♂/♀

Mamidipally is a village in Rangareddy district in Telangana, India.

== Notable people ==
1. Thiruveer: Indian Film and Stage Actor and Director.
