= Haddhu Ledhu Raa =

2024 Indian film

- Directed by: Rajashekkar Raavi
- Story by: Rajashekkar Raavi
- Produced by: Mohan Rao Raavi
- Starring: Ashish Gandhi; Hrithika; Varsha Viswanath; Tanikella Bharani
- Cinematography: Ak Anandh
- Edited by: Gowtham Raj Nerusu
- Music by: Kamal Kumar D
- Production companies: Tiger Hills Production; Swarna Pictures
- Release date: 21 March 2024
- Running time: 112 Minutes
- Country: India
- Language: Telugu

Haddhu Ledhu Raa is a 2024 Indian Telugu-language action drama film written and directed by Rajashekkar Raavi. Produced by Mohan Rao Raavi under Tiger Hills Production, Swarna Pictures, it stars Ashish Gandhi, Ashok, Varsha, Hrithika and Tanikella Bharani in lead roles. The film was theatrically released on 21 March 2024.

== Cast ==
- Ashish Gandhi
- Hrithika
- Varsha Viswanath
- Tanikella Bharani
- Rajeev Kanakala
- Ashok
- Varsha
- Dayanand Reddy

== Soundtrack ==
The music and background score is composed by Kamal Kumar D.

No.	Title	Lyrics	Singer(s)	Length
1.	"Pillagada"	Rambabu Gosala	Harika Narayan	4:05
2.	"Chigurinche"	Rambabu Gosala	Vedha Vagdevi	2:27
3.	"Friendship"	Rambabu Gosala	Abhay Jodhpurkar	3:45
