= Average Student Nani =

2024 Indian film

- Theatrical release poster
- Directed by: Pawan Kumar Kothuri
- Written by: Pawan Kumar Kothuri
- Produced by: Pawan Kumar Kothuri; Bishali Geol
- Starring: Pawan Kumar Kothuri; Sahiba Bhasin; Sneha Malviya; Rajeev Kanakala; Viviya Santh
- Cinematography: Sajeesh Rajendran
- Edited by: Uddhav SB
- Music by: Karthik B Kodakandla
- Production company: Sri Neelakanta Mahadeva Entertainments LLP
- Distributed by: T-Series Telugu
- Release date: 2 August 2024
- Running time: 138 minutes
- Country: India
- Language: Telugu

Average Student Nani is a 2024 Telugu-language Indian romantic drama film produced by Pawan Kumar Kothuri and Bishali Geol under Sri Neelakanta Mahadeva Entertainments LLP banner and written and directed by also Pawan Kumar Kothuri. It also features Pawan Kumar Kothuri, Sabiha Bhasin and Sneha Malviya are in lead roles while Rajeev Kanakala, Viviya Santh, Jhansi, Khaleja Giri, Bindu and others are in supporting roles. The music of the film composed by Karthik B Kodakandla.

Director Pawan Kumar Kothuri's first film was Merise Merise (2021) which was a success and it is Pawan Kumar's second film in which Kumar himself has produced, directed and acted in the lead role.

== Cast ==
- Pawan Kumar Kothuri as Nani
- Sahiba Bhasin as Anu
- Sneha Malviya as Sarayu Naidu "Sara"
- Rajeev Kanakala as Nani's father
- Viviya Santh as Indira
- Jhansi as Nani's mother
- Mani Sai K as Lucky
- Indu as Renu
- Khaleja Giri
- Bindu

== Release ==
The film was theatrically released on 2 August 2024 by PVR Inox Pictures.

== Reception ==
Suhas Sistu from The Hans India gave rating 3/5 stars and wrote that "'Average Student Nani' is a delightful family drama that resonates with audiences. Pawan Kumar Kothuri has proven his mettle as a hero, director, and producer, successfully delivering a film that is both entertaining and meaningful. The positive reception from viewers underscores the film's appeal, marking it as a notable success in the current cinema landscape".

Nelki Naresh Kumar from Hindustan Times Telugu wrote that "The routine storyline was a minus for an average student. In the first half, the comedy was lightened in the college episodes where the scenes in the backdrop of Nani's family were funny. It would have been better if the scene where Nani changes was written with some more depth".

A critic from News18 wrote that "Director Pawan Kumar is successful in portraying the struggles of an average student, belonging to a middle-class family. His direction beautifully amalgamates the various emotions shown, while the love triangle gives more depth to it. Pawan was able to give a realistic depiction of a young struggling student. The two female leads add glam and charm to the release".
