= Nandi Award for Best Female Comedian =

Indian film award

This is a list of the recipients of the Nandi Award for Best Female Comedian since 1996, when the award for this category was instituted.

Year	Female Comedian	Film
2016	Pragathi	Kalyana Vaibhogame
2015	Snigdha	Jatha Kalise
2014	Vidyullekha Raman	Run Raja Run
2013	--	--
2012	--	--
2011	Ratna Sagar	Karalu Miryalu
2010	Jhansi	Simha
2009	Hema	Konchem Ishtam Konchem Kashtam
2008	--	--
2007	Jhansi	Tulasi
2006	Abhinayashree	Paisalo Paramatma
2005	Santoshini	Nuvvostanante Nenoddantana
2004	Jahnavi	Yagnam
2003	Kovai Sarala	Ori Nee Prema Bangaram Kaanu
2002	Rama Prabha	Lahiri Lahiri Lahirilo
2001	Sri Lakshmi	Preminchu
2000	Kovai Sarala	Rayalaseema Ramanna Chowdary
1999	Sri Lakshmi	Police
1998	Rajitha	Pelli Kanuka
1997	Sri Lakshmi	Chelikaadu
1996	Sri Lakshmi	Sahanam
