= Oh..! Sukumari =

2026 Indian Telugu language film

- Theatrical release poster
- Directed by: Bharat Dharshan
- Written by: Bharat Darshan
- Produced by: Maheswar Reddy Mooli
- Starring: Thiruveer; Aishwarya Rajesh
- Cinematography: CH Kushendar
- Edited by: Sree Varaprasad
- Music by: Bharath Manchiraju
- Production company: Gangaa Entertainments
- Distributed by: Prathyangira Cinemas
- Release date: 17 July 2026
- Running time: 137 minutes
- Country: India
- Language: Telugu

Oh..! Sukumari is a 2026 Indian Telugu-language romantic comedy film directed by Bharat Dharshan. The film stars Thiruveer, and Aishwarya Rajesh.

== Cast ==
- Thiruveer as Yadagiri, "Yadi" an aspiring politician
- Aishwarya Rajesh as Damini
- Srinivas Gavireddy
- Muralidhar Goud
- Aamani
- Kranthi Balivada
- Kota Jayaram
- Anji Mama
- Jhansi

== Reception ==
Shreya Varanasi of The Times of India said that "Despite an original hook and committed performances, Oh Sukumari never finds the spark needed to rise above its familiar storytelling, leaving its strongest idea largely unexplored." Sangeetha Devi Dundoo of The Hindu said that "Oh! Sukumari does not attempt to reinvent rural comedy. Even so, it delivers a reasonably engaging watch that balances humour and emotion to leave an impression." BVS Prakash of the Deccan Chronicle said that "While it aims to deliver a modern comedy, the execution relies heavily on forced subplots and archaic tropes. As it stands, this cringe comedy delivers a painful shock." Bhawana Tanmayi of Money Control said that "Oh Sukumari remains an interesting concept that fails to live up to expectations. It delivers a regular commercial entertainer instead of the sharp, inventive comedy it could have been."
