= 23 Iravai Moodu =

2025 Indian Telugu-language film by Raj Rachakonda

- Theatrical release poster
- Directed by: Raj Rachakonda
- Written by: Raj Rachakonda
- Produced by: Raj Rachakonda
- Starring: Teja; Tanmai
- Cinematography: Sunny Kurapati
- Edited by: Anil Aalayam
- Music by: Mark K. Robin
- Production company: Studio 99
- Release date: 16 May 2025
- Running time: 135 minutes
- Country: India
- Language: Telugu

23 Iravai Moodu is a 2025 Indian Telugu-language legal drama film written and directed by Raj Rachakonda. Based on 1991 Tsunduru massacre, 1993 Chilakaluripeta massacre and 1997 Hyderabad Car Bomb Blast, the film features Teja and Tanmai in lead roles.

The film was released on 16 May 2025.

== Plot ==
The plot of 23 Iravai Moodu centers on Sagar, a young man from a backward community in a Guntur district village, and his love interest, Susheela, who comes from a similar background.

Pressured by Susheela's unexpected pregnancy and an urgent need for money to start their married life, Sagar, guided by his friend Dasu, gets involved in a bus robbery planned to appear as a Naxalite act.

When their disguise is uncovered and the passengers retaliate, Sagar desperately ignites a matchstick to help Dasu escape, but the ensuing chaos leads to the bus catching fire and the tragic death of 23 passengers.

== Cast ==
- Teja as Sagar
- Tanmai as Suseela
- Pawon Ramesh as Das
- Jhansi as Dr. Beena
- Thagubothu Ramesh as Raju
- Praneeth Yaron as SI

== Music ==
All music is composed by Mark K Robin.

No.	Title	Lyrics	Singer(s)	Length
1.	"Bangaram Akkarleni"	Chandrabose	Karthik, Ramya Behara	3:41
2.	"Kosee Koyyangaane"	Warangal Shankar	Rela John	2:02
3.	"Egaraale"	Chandrabose	Kailash Kher	4:36
4.	"Dhora Pogaaka"	Indus Martin	Aditi Bhavaraju	2:27
5.	"Cherasala"	Chandrabose	Chinmayi Sripada, Kapil Kapilan	3:47
6.	"Jo laali Jo Jo"	Indus Martin	Aditi Bhavaraju	3:22
7.	"Laali Paata Inka Avvanelede"	Rahman	Sindhuja Srinivasan	2:53

== Release and reception ==
23 Iravai Moodu was released on 16 May 2025. The film was released on Amazon Prime Video and ETV Win on 27 June 2025.

Sangeetha Devi Dundoo of The Hindu stated that, "23 is not an easy film to watch; it is a brave film that does not flinch from addressing tough issues" and praised the writing. NTV rated the film 3 out of 5 with particular praise for lead cast and Raj Rachakonda.
