= Chithirayil Nilachoru =

2013 Indian film by R. Sundarrajan

- Theatrical release poster
- Directed by: R. Sundarrajan
- Written by: R. Sundarrajan
- Produced by: Murugesan; Palanisamy; Balasubramaniam
- Starring: Prakash Nath; Vasundhara Kashyap; Sara Arjun
- Cinematography: Rajarajan
- Music by: Ilaiyaraaja
- Production company: Sri Senthoor Pictures
- Release date: 18 October 2013
- Country: India
- Language: Tamil

Chithirayil Nilachoru (transl. The moonlight of Chithirai) is a 2013 Indian Tamil-language drama film written and directed by R. Sundarrajan. The film stars Prakash Nath, Vasundhara Kashyap and Sara Arjun, with Ashok Sundarrajan and Ganja Karuppu playing other pivotal characters. It was released on 18 October 2013.

== Plot ==
Gauri gets into a quarrel with an auto rickshaw driver for disrupting the purpose of her visit. She falls for him, just when she wants to wreck his life in return.

== Cast ==
- Prakash Nath as Muthukumar
- Vasundhara as Gauri
- Baby Sara as Oviya
- Ashok Sundarrajan as Ashok
- Ganja Karuppu as Subramani
- Kovai Sarala
- K. P. Jagannath as Jagan
- Delhi Ganesh as Gauri's father
- Sankaralingam
- Ravi Prakash
- Kalairani as Shop Owner
- R. Sundarrajan as Sundaram
- Fathima Babu as Church Mother
- Anuradha Krishnamoorthy
- Singamuthu
- Aarthi
- King Kong
- Halwa Vasu
- Boys Rajan
- Bava Lakshmanan
- Perazhagi Gayathri Raj as cameo appearance
- Bhumika Chawla as a fake beggar / mentally challenged person (special appearance)
- Radha Ravi as Police Inspector (special appearance)

== Production ==
R. Sundarrajan, a prominent director in the 1980s, chose to make a comeback into direction with the film after 12 years. Child actress Sara Arjun earned up to ₹1 lakh (equivalent to ₹1.7 lakh or US$1,800 in 2023) per day for her role in the film. Sundarrajan's son Ashok made his debut as an actor with the project.

== Soundtrack ==
The soundtrack was composed by Ilaiyaraaja.

Song	Singers	Lyrics
"Kallaale Senju (Men)"	Haricharan	Vaali
"Kallaale Senju (Lady)"	Priyadarshini	Vaali
"Ungappan Pera"	Ilaiyaraaja	Gangai Amaran
"Kaalaiyile Maalai"	Sabtha Barnar	Pulamaipithan
"Nandri Solla"	P. Karthi, Priyadarshini	Palani Bharathi

== Reception ==
M. Suganth from The Times of India gave the film 1/5 stars and wrote, "If this had been a first-timer's film, we would have felt pity but coming from a veteran, who has given us at least half-a-dozen memorable films, we feel cheated."

Arjun was nominated for the Best Child Actor award at the 3rd South Indian International Movie Awards.
