= Srimathi (2026 film) =

2026 Indian Telugu-language film by Vishvak Khanderao

- శ్రీమతి
- Directed by: Vishvak Khanderao
- Written by: Vishvak Khanderao
- Produced by: K. Niranjan Reddy; Chaitanya Reddy
- Starring: Nivetha Thomas; Thiruveer
- Cinematography: Aditya Javvadi
- Edited by: Raviteja Girijala
- Music by: E. L. Viswanath
- Production company: PrimeShow Entertainment
- Distributed by: Zee 5"
- Release date: 4 December 2026 (Zee 5)
- Country: India
- Language: Telugu

Srimathi (Telugu: శ్రీమతి) is an upcoming Indian Telugu-language family drama film written and directed by Vishvak Khanderao. Produced by K. Niranjan Reddy and Chaitanya Reddy under PrimeShow Entertainment as a Teluguy Zee 5 original, the film stars Nivetha Thomas and Thiruveer. It is scheduled to premiere directly on Zee 5 on 4 December 2026.

== Premise ==
Madhusree, a middle-class homemaker, navigates the conflict between traditional familial expectations and her personal dreams and self-respect after marriage. Zee 5 describes the film as the story of "a newlywed woman [who] defies patriarchal traditions when marriage reduces her dreams to endless chores."

== Cast ==
- Nivetha Thomas as Madhusree
- Thiruveer
- Goparaju Ramana
- Vijji Chandrashekar
- Hariteja

== Production ==
Srimathi is produced by K. Niranjan Reddy and Chaitanya Reddy under PrimeShow Entertainment. Vishvak Khanderao, who previously directed Skylab (2021), wrote and directed the film. Aditya Javvadi handled the cinematography, Raviteja Girijala served as the editor, and E. L. Viswanath composed the music. The film marks Nivetha Thomas's return to Telugu cinema following a hiatus. Following the teaser release, media outlets noted thematic similarities to the Malayalam film The Great Indian Kitchen (2021), though the makers have not officially stated whether it is an adaptation or an original story.

== Release ==
The official teaser was unveiled by Zee 5 South on 19 November 2026. Srimathi is scheduled for a direct digital release on Zee 5 on 4 December 2026.
