= The Great Pre-Wedding Show =

2025 Indian Telugu film by Rahul Srinivas

- Theatrical release poster
- Directed by: Rahul Srinivas Lukalapu
- Written by: Rahul Srinivas Lukalapu
- Produced by: Sanddeep Agaram; Ashmita Reddy Basani
- Starring: Thiruveer; Teena Sravya; Rohan Roy
- Cinematography: K Soma Sekhar
- Edited by: Naresh Adupa
- Music by: Suresh Bobbili
- Production companies: 7pm Productions; Puppet Show Productions
- Release date: 7 November 2025
- Running time: 116 minutes
- Country: India
- Language: Telugu

The Great Pre-Wedding Show is a 2025 Indian Telugu-language comedy drama film written and directed by Rahul Srinivas Lukalapu. It stars Thiruveer and Teena Sravya in lead roles.

The film was released on 7 November 2025 to positive reviews from critics and was successful at the box office.

== Plot ==
The Great Pre-Wedding Show follows Ramesh, a small-town photographer who runs a modest studio in rural Andhra Pradesh. Ramesh is quietly in love with Hema, an employee at the local panchayat office, but neither of them admits their feelings.

Ramesh's life becomes complicated when a wealthy and influential man, Anand, hires him to shoot an elaborate pre-wedding photo and video session for his upcoming marriage to Soundarya. Ramesh completes the assignment, but the footage goes missing after his assistant Ramu accidentally misplaces the memory card. Fearing severe consequences if the powerful groom discovers the loss, Ramesh panics and attempts to cover up the mistake.

In desperation, Ramesh devises various schemes to stall or disrupt the wedding, believing that if the event is postponed or cancelled, no one will ask for the missing pre-wedding material. His plans lead to a series of comedic misadventures, misunderstandings, and chaos within the village.

As the situation spirals out of control, Ramesh begins to confront the emotional and moral consequences of his actions. The tone shifts toward drama as he grapples with guilt, strained relationships, and the impact of his deception on the couple and their families. Meanwhile, his bond with Hema deepens, pushing him to take responsibility for his mistakes.

Ultimately, Ramesh sets out to correct the damage he has caused, seeking forgiveness and a chance at personal redemption.

== Cast ==
- Thiruveer as Ramesh
- Teena Sravya as Hema
- G. Rohan Roy as Ramu
- Narendra Ravi as Mangipudi Anand
- Yamini Nageswar as Soundarya
- Prabhavathi Varma as Mangipudi Kanthamma
- Madhavi Prasad as Soundarya's mother
- Krovvidi Joga Rao as Mangipudi Narayana
- Bank Basha as Soundarya's father
- Waltair Vinay as Anand's friend

== Music ==
The background score and songs are composed by Suresh Bobbili.

All lyrics are written by SaNaRe.

Track listing
No.	Title	Singer(s)	Length
1.	"Vayyari Vayyari"	Yashwanth Nag, Sindhuja Srinivasan	4:51
2.	"Naa Valane"	Anudeep Dev	4:11
3.	"Pre Wedding Anthem"	Mangli	4:27
4.	"Jigijikka"	Suresh Bobbili	4:20
Total length:			17:41

== Release ==
The Great Pre-Wedding Show was released on 7 November 2025. The post-theatrical digital streaming rights were acquired by ZEE5, and it premiered on the platform on 5 December 2025.

== Reception ==
The Hindu praised Thiruveer's performance, writing and the storytelling, while also calling Suresh Bobbili's folk song compositions as "value addition". Suhas Sistu of The Hans India rated the film 3 out of 5 and stated, "a cheerful entertainer with laughs, love, and life". Suresh Kavirayani of The New Indian Express rated the film 3 out of 5 noting Thiruveer's performance and opined that the "writing is fresh, and the dialogues are well-written". In her review for The Times of India, Divya Shree wrote that, Rahul Srinivas delivers a charming rural comedy-drama that beautifully balances humor and emotion.
