= Pareshan =

- Pareshan Movie Poster
- Directed by: Rupak Ronaldson
- Written by: Rupak Ronaldson
- Produced by: Siddharth Rallapalli; Rana Daggubati (presenter)
- Starring: Thiruveer; Pavani Karanam; Bunny Abhiran; Sai Prasanna; Arjun Krishna
- Cinematography: Vasu Pendem
- Edited by: Harishankar
- Music by: Yashwanth Nag
- Production company: Waltair Productions
- Release date: 2 June 2023
- Running time: 135 minutes
- Country: India
- Language: Telugu

Pareshan is a 2023 Indian Telugu-language comedy film written and directed by Rupak Ronaldson. It stars Thiruveer, Pavani Karanam, Bunny Abhiran, Sai Prasanna, Arjun Krishna, Buddera Khan, Ravi and Raju Bedigala play key roles.

Pareshan is produced by Siddharth Rallapalli of Waltair Productions, with Yashwanth Nag composing the music. Presented by Rana Daggubati and his company Spirit Media. The movie is scheduled to release on 2 June 2023.

== Premise ==
Issac, Paasha, Satthi, and RGV are four happy-go-lucky youngsters living in the Singareni area. Isaac, an ITI student, is chastised by his father, a miner in Singareni collieries, for his poor academic performance and spending time with friends. When one of his friends finds himself in need of money to avoid a police case, Isaac lends him the fifty thousand rupees that his father gave him. Unfortunately, his friend fails to repay the borrowed money. As Isaac grapples with this predicament, his girlfriend Shireesha reveals that she is pregnant and requires financial assistance for an abortion. To make matters worse, the money he had collected for the abortion procedure was stolen by another friend. The rest of the film is about how Isaac handled his problems.

== Cast ==
- Thiruveer as Isaac
- Pavani Karanam as Shireesha
- Bunny Abhiran as Basha
- Sai Prasanna as Rajitha
- Arjun Krishna (Satthi)
- Buddera Khan
- Ravi
- Raju Bedigala
- Prem Kumar
- Muralidhar Goud as Samarpan

== Soundtrack ==
The soundtrack was composed by Yashwanth Nag, with lyrics written by Akkala ChandraMouli Varma Rupak Ronaldson. The soundtrack was distributed by Sony Music South

Pareshan

Soundtrack album by Yashwanth Nag
- Released: 2023
- Recorded: 2023
- Genre: Feature film soundtrack
- Label: Sony Music South
- Producer: Yashwanth Nag

| No. | Title | Lyrics | Artist(s) | Length |
|---|---|---|---|---|
| 1. | "Sau Sara" | Akkala Chandra Mouli Varma | Yashwant Nag | 03:00 |
| 2. | "Atharu Butharu" | Akkala Chandra Mouli Varma | Yashwant Nag | 03:20 |
| Total length: | | | | TMD |

== Promotion ==
The teaser of this movie made in Telangana dialect was released on 20 February 2023. The teaser got a good response.

Rana released a comedy video on 5 April 2023, as part of the promotion of this film presented by Rana Daggubati. The video featuring Samosa as the main ingredient was a hit.

Rana released film's theatrical trailer on 21 May 2023, at PVR R.K. Cineflex in Hyderabad.

== Release ==
This movie is released on 2 June 2023.

== Reception ==
Sangeetha Devi Dundoo of The Hindu Barring a few fun segments, ‘Pareshan’ goes overboard in its stereotypical depiction of the lifestyle of rural Telangana. Thiruveer's and Pavani's earnestness is the silver lining.

Latha Srinivasan of India Today gave it 2.5 out of 5 stars and wrote, "Pareshan is a decent attempt by the director to deliver a village-centric comedy that gives us glimpses into typical village life, like Seenu's wedding celebrations, the church services, and so on. But one wishes it had a little bit more going for it in terms of the story to make it more impactful."
