= Tulasi (2007 film) =

- Movie Poster
- Directed by: Boyapati Srinu
- Written by: Boyapati Srinu; Akula Shiva; Paruchuri Brothers
- Produced by: D. Suresh Babu
- Starring: Venkatesh; Nayantara
- Cinematography: B. Balamurugan
- Edited by: Marthand K. Venkatesh
- Music by: Devi Sri Prasad
- Distributed by: Suresh Productions
- Release date: 12 October 2007
- Running time: 153 minutes
- Country: India
- Language: Telugu
- Box office: ₹32 crore

Tulasi is a 2007 Indian Telugu-language action drama film co-written and directed by Boyapati Srinu, and produced by D.Suresh Babu on Suresh Productions banner. It stars Venkatesh and Nayantara in the lead roles. The film was a commercial super hit at the box office.

== Plot ==
Parvataneni Tulasi Ram is an architect in Hyderabad who is also the native of Rayalaseema, which is well known for factional feuds. When his wife Vasundhara turns pregnant, Tulasi takes her to their native place. After arriving at the native place, Tulasi turns violent when a rival faction pushes his father Dasaratha Ramayya and the factional feuds continue to haunt him. When Vasundhara's brother Harsha dies in the attack by factionists, Vasundhara could not digest the violence and deserts Tulasi with their son also named Harsha. Later, Tulasi learns that Harsha has a blood clot in his brain, which may cause a hemorrhage. With the help of Dr. Surekha, Tulasi summons specialists from abroad in order to get Harsha operated. When everything is ready for the surgery, a gangster named Veeranna, kidnaps Harsha as both of his sons Ravi and Shankar were killed by Tulasi. However, Tulasi kills Veeranna in order to save Harsha, where Tulasi finally reunites with Vasundhara and Harsha.

== Cast ==
- Venkatesh as Parvataneni Tulasi Ram
- Nayantara as Vasundhara Tulasi Ram
- Master Atul as Harsha, Tulasi & Vasundhara’s son
- Ashish Vidyarthi as Veeranna, a gangster
- Rahul Dev as Basavaraju
- Sudha as Lakshmi, Tulasi's mother
- Vijaykumar as Parvataneni Dasaratha Ramayya, Tulasi's father
- Geetha as Janaki, Vasundhara's mother
- Sivaji as Harsha, Vasundhara's brother
- Paruchuri Venkateswara Rao as Venkatachalam
- Chandra Mohan as Chandram, Vasundhara's father
- Brahmanandam as Appalaraju/Pappalaraju
- Ali as Apartment Owner
- Satyam Rajesh as Tulasi's friend
- Uttej as Tulasi's friend
- Ramya Krishnan as Dr. Surekha
- Nadhiya as Prabhavati, Tulasi's aunt
- Ahuti Prasad as Raghavendra, Tulasi's uncle
- Subbaraju as Ravi, Veeranna's elder son
- Riyaz Khan as Shankar, Veeranna's younger son
- Jhansi as Kokapet aunty
- Jaya Prakash Reddy as Chandrayya, Ramayya's rival
- Raghu Babu as Raghu
- Ravi Babu as Prasad
- Tanikella Bharani as Kantepudi Srinivasa Rao
- Naramalli Sivaprasad
- Narsing Yadav as Narasing, Veeranna's henchman
- Banerjee as Banerjee
- Bandla Ganesh
- Sameer
- Chitram Srinu
- Dr. Siva Prasad
- Siva Parvathi
- Shravan
- Tarzan
- Sravani
- Devisri
- Saraswatamma
- Bill Bitra
- Shriya Saran in a guest appearance in the song "Ne Chuk Chuk Bandini"

== Soundtrack ==
Tulasi

Soundtrack album by Devi Sri Prasad
- Released: 21 September 2007
- Recorded: 2007
- Genre: Feature film soundtrack
- Length: 26:38
- Language: Telugu
- Label: Aditya Music
- Producer: Devi Sri Prasad

Devi Sri Prasad chronology
Shankar Dada Zindabad (2007)	Tulasi (2007)	Jalsa (2008)

Music composed by Devi Sri Prasad. Music released on ADITYA Music Company. Audio of Tulasi was launched at a function arranged in the song set at Rama Naidu studios in the evening of 22 September 2007. K. Raghavendra Rao, D. Ramanaidu and KL Narayana attended this function as guests. K. Raghavendra Rao released the audio cassette and gave the first unit to D. Ramanaidu. D. Ramanaidu released the audio CD and gave the first unit to Shriya Saran.

Track listing
No.	Title	Lyrics	Artist(s)	Length
1.	"Mia Mia"	Chandrabose	Naveen Madhav, Mamta Mohandas	4:32
2.	"Vennelintha Vedigaa"	Chandrabose	Venu Srirangam, Sunitha	4:17
3.	"Thula Thula Thulasi"	Chandrabose	Priya Hemesh, Tippu	4:37
4.	"Hello Boys"	Chandrabose	Devi Sri Prasad	3:48
5.	"Nee Kallathoti"	Bhaskarabhatla Ravi Kumar	Sagar, Chitra	3:56
6.	"Ne Chuk Chuk Bandini (Raja Raja Bobbili Raja)"	Sahithi	Malgudi Subha, Devi Sri Prasad	5:10
7.	"Cheekatanthaa Vennelaaye Chudaraa (Unreleased/Theatrical Version)"	Uncredited	Venu Srirangam	1:52
Total length:				26:38

== Release and reception ==
The film released with 290 prints worldwide. It was later dubbed and released in Tamil and Malayalam with the same title and in Hindi as The Real Man Hero.

Jeevi of Idlebrain.com rated the film 3 out of 5. Radhika Rajamani of Rediff.com rated the film 2.5 out of 5 stars and wrote, "Thulasi is a hardcore commercial film. One may find similarities with other films too while watching it".

== Box office ==
The film has undergone the theatrical business of 12 crores and grossed 32 crores.

== Awards ==
- Jhansi won Nandi Award for Best Female Comedian
