= Rajeev Kanakala =

Indian actor

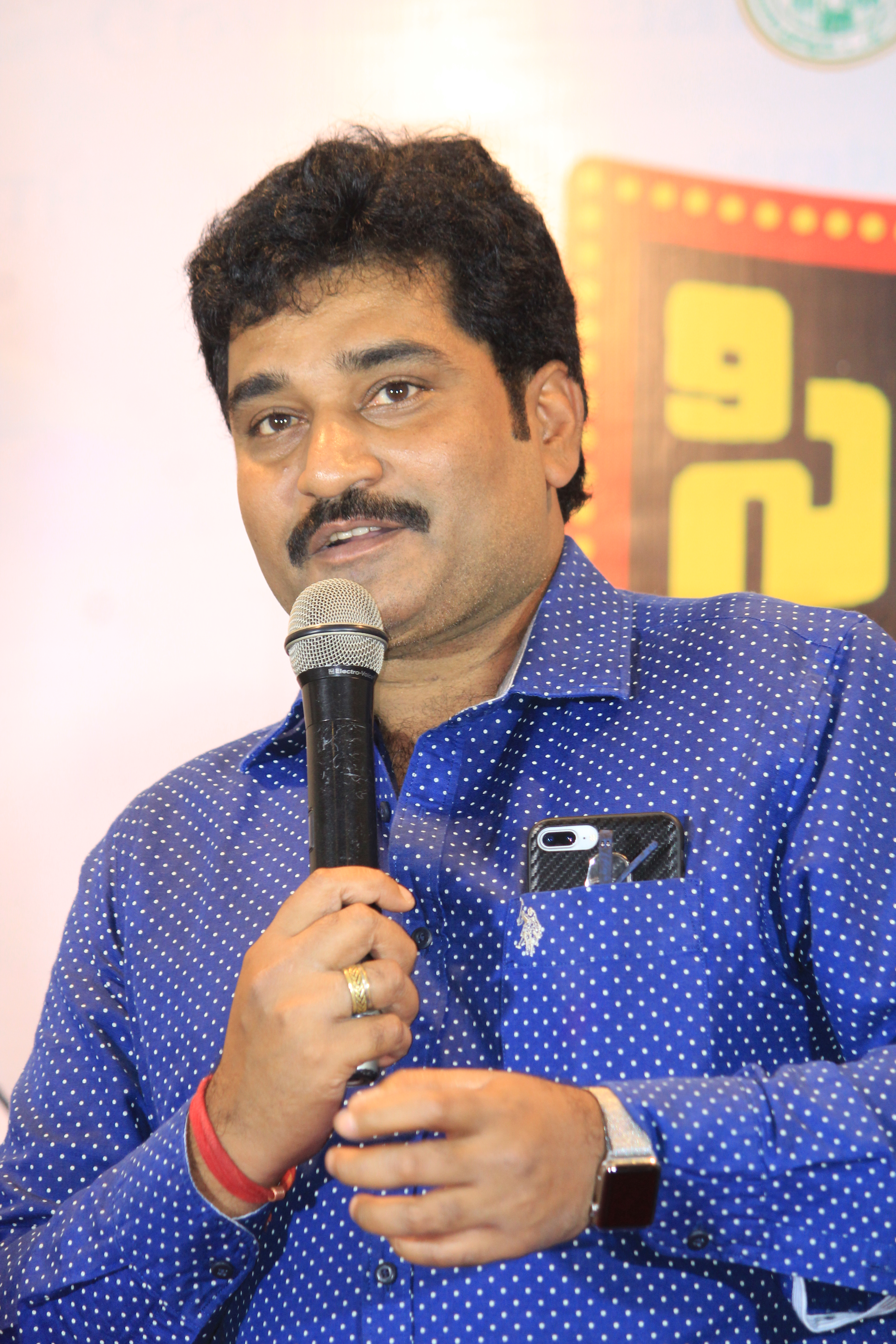
- Kanakala in 2017
- Born: 13 November 1969 (age 57); Yanam, Pondicherry (now Puducherry), India
- Other name: Rajiv
- Years active: 1995–present
- Spouse: Suma Kanakala (m. 1999)
- Children: 2, including Roshan Kanakala
- Parents: Devadas Kanakala (father); Lakshmi Kanakala (mother)

Rajeev Kanakala (born 13 November 1969) is an Indian actor who works predominantly in Telugu films and television. He started his career in television serials and short films, where he not only acted but also produced and directed. He is married to Suma Kanakala since 1999, who is an actress and TV anchor.

In 2013, he started a production house along with his wife which produces TV shows.

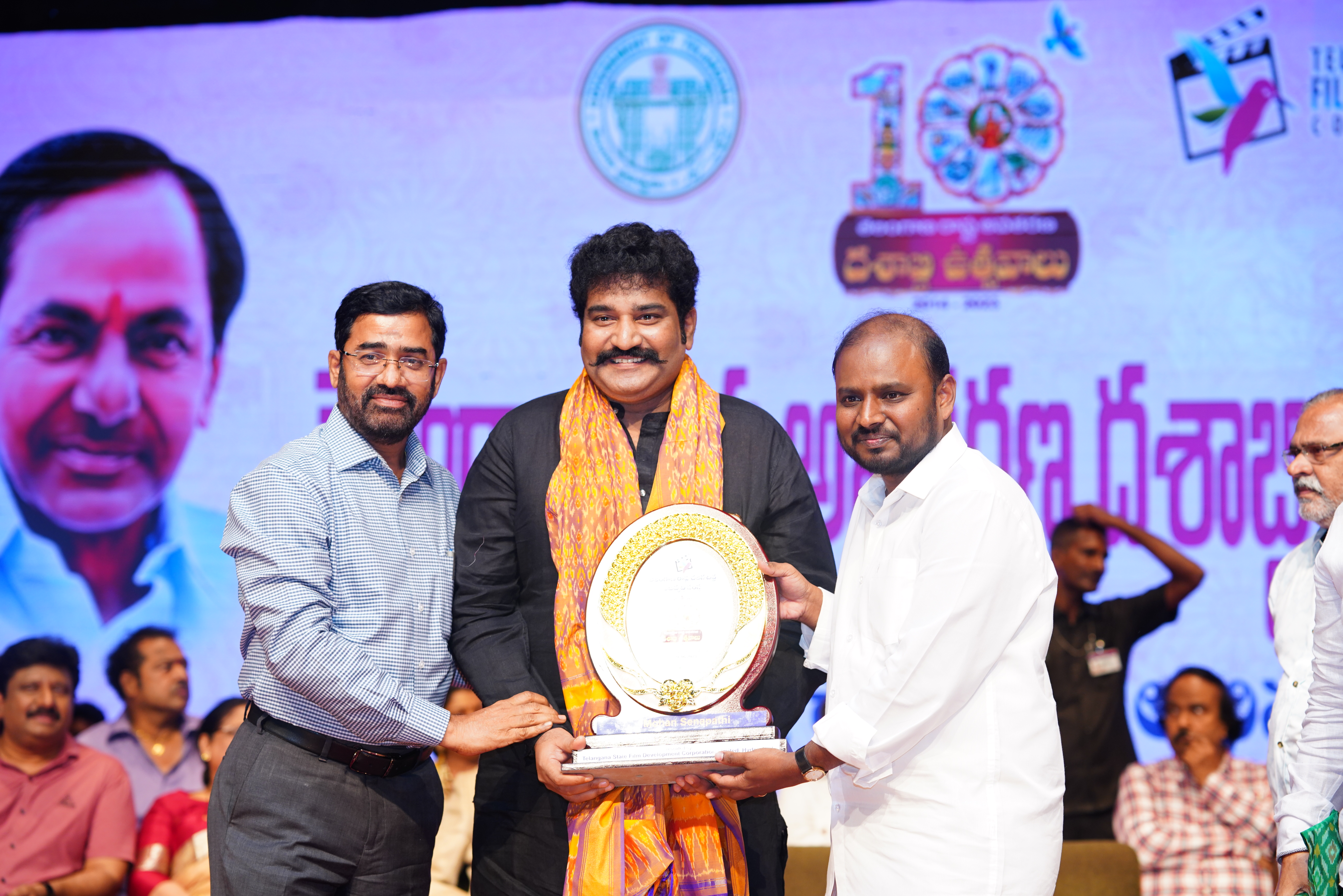
Rajeev Kanakala receives felicitation from FDC chairman for Anil Kurmanchalam and MD Korem Ashok Reddy on the eve of decennial celebrations of Telangana formation on 21 June 2023

== Filmography ==
Year	Title	Role	Notes
1995	Rambantu	Jayakrishna	
1995	Big Boss		
1996	Sahanam		
1997	Peddannayya	Rama Krishna Prasad's friend	
1997	Wi/o V. Vara Prasad		
1998	Auto Driver	Jagan's brother-in-law	
1998	Kanyadanam	Sarma	
1998	Aahaa..!	Prashant	
1999	Prema Kosam	Chandu's friend	
2001	Student No.1	Satya	
2002	Friends	Siddu	
2002	Aadi	Rajiv	
2002	Nuvve Nuvve	Anjali's brother	
2003	Naaga	Guru	
2003	Dhanush	Vicky	
2003	Vijayam	Usha's brother	
2003	Ninne Istapaddanu	Boney	
2003	Ottesi Cheputunna	Venkat	
2003	Chantigadu		
2004	Nenu	Seenu	
2004	Adavi Ramudu		
2004	Swamy	Anand	
2004	Donga Dongadi	Ganesh	
2004	Sye	Rugby coach Rafi	
2005	Orey Pandu	Vicky	
2005	A Film by Aravind	Aravind	
2005	Athadu	Pardhasaradhi "Pardhu"	
2005	Meenakshi	Nandu	
2006	Chinnodu	Inspector Sanjay	
2006	Samanyudu	Das	
2006	Ashok	Rajiv	
2006	Vikramarkudu	Inspector Mahanti	
2006	Lakshmi	Lakshmi's brother	
2006	Kokila		
2007	Athidhi	Amritha's father	
2007	Yamadonga	Lord Indra	
2008	Vishaka Express	Dr. Raja	
2008	Ontari	Raghava	
2008	Hare Ram	GK Reddy	
2008	Black & White	Bharath	
2008	Raksha	Venu	
2008	Chintakayala Ravi	Sunitha's to-be groom	
2008	Poison		
2008	Jabilamma	Abhi	
2009	Punnami Naagu		
2009	Baanam	Gudipudi Venkateswara Ra	
2010	Cara Majaka		
2011	Aakasa Ramanna	Teja	
2011	Kshetram		
2011	Money Money, More Money	Bullabbai	
2011	Siruthai	Inspector Bharath	Tamil film
2011	Dookudu	Sathyam	
2012	Cinemakeldam Randi		
2012	A Melody in the Haunted		
2012	Eega	Thief's manager	Simultaneously shot in Tamil
2012	Naan Ee	Govindhan's manager	Simultaneously shot in Tamil
2013	Donga Police	Joseph "Joe" / Jack	
2013	Naayak	Siddharth's brother-in-law	
2013	Badshaah	Police Informer Keshava	
2013	Thikka		
2013	Sahasra	Narasimhan	
2014	Race Gurram	Rajeev	
2014	Geethanjali		Special appearance
2015	Raju Gari Gadhi	Doctor	
2016	Nannaku Prematho	Abhiram's brother	
2016	Dictator	Waiter	
2016	Raja Cheyyi Vesthe	Chaitra's father	
2016	Janatha Garage	Vikas	
2016	Sarrainodu	Defense Lawyer Govindaraju	
2016	Kundanapu Bomma		
2016	Shankara	Inspector Rajeev	
2016	Appatlo Okadundevadu	Ashok Reddy	
2017	LIE	Chaitra's father	
2017	Anando Brahma	Ramu	
2017	Raja the Great	Police Officer	
2017	MCA	Nani’s elder brother	
2018	Vijetha	Rajiv	
2018	Lover	Jaggu	
2018	Rangasthalam	Rangamma husband	
2019	Maharshi	Farmer	
2019	Rakshasudu	Prasad	
2020	Sarileru Neekevvaru	Ramakrishna	
2020	Entha Manchivaadavuraa	Ganga Raju	
2021	April 28 Em Jarigindi	Film director	
2021	Thellavarithe Guruvaram	Madhu’s father	
2021	Sashi	Sashi's father	
2021	Naarappa	Basavaiah	
2021	Love Story	Narasimham	
2021	Pelli SandaD		
2022	RRR	Venkat Avadhani	
2022	Sadha Nannu Nadipe	Dr Rajeev	
2022	Geetha		
2023	Veera Simha Reddy	Suri Reddy	
2023	Virupaksha	Harishchandra Prasad	
2023	Chakravyuham: The Trap	Sridhar	
2023	Samajavaragamana	Sarayu’s biological father	
2023	Bhaag Saale	Royal Murthy	
2023	Hidimbha		
2023	Natho Nenu		
2023	Peddha Kapu 1		
2023	Mama Mascheendra		
2024	Love Me	Builder	
2024	Haddhu Ledhu Raa		
2024	Rakshana	Ram’s father	
2024	The Birthday Boy	Balu Dasari’s father	
2024	Average Student Nani	Nani's father	
2025	Game Changer	Mukundha	
2025	Brahma Anandam	Sarpanch	
2025	Thala		
2025	Dear Uma	Uma’s father	
2025	Chaurya Paatham	Zamindar	
2025	Little Hearts	Nalli Gopal Rao	
2025	Love OTP	Shankar	Also shot in Kannada
2025	Andhra King Taluka	Surya’s manager	
2026	Nawab Cafe	Ranganatham	
2026	Couple Friendly	Mithra’s father	
2026	Lenin	Nagamani	
2026	Amma Naaku Aa Abbayi Kaavali		
2026	ENE Repeat	Himself	Cameo Appearance
2027	Dragon		

=== Television ===
Year	Title	Role	Network
1995	Lady Detective	Gopal Varma	ETV
1997–2000	Ruthuragalu	Prudhvi	DD Saptagiri
2000–2001	Santhi Nivasam	Adarsh	ETV
2020	Metro Kathalu	Abbas	Aha
2021	Oka Chinna Family Story		ZEE5
2023	Dead Pixels	Bhargav's father	Disney+ Hotstar
2025	Hometown	Prasad	Aha
2025	Constable Kanakam	Samba Siva Rao	ETV Win
2025	D/o Prasad Rao: Kanabadutaledu		ZEE5
