= Sara Arjun =

Indian actress (born 2005)

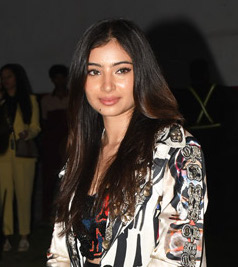
- Arjun in 2026
- Born: 18 June 2005 (age 21); Mumbai, Maharashtra, India
- Occupation: Actress
- Years active: 2006–present
- Father: Raj Arjun

Sara Arjun (born 18 June 2005) is an Indian actress who primarily appears in Tamil, Hindi and few Telugu films. The daughter of actor Raj Arjun, she started her career as a child artist. Sara gained recognition for her performance in Deiva Thirumagal (2011) and Saivam (2014), both received critical and commercial acclaim. She gained wider recognition for her role in the Dhurandhar Duology, comprising the spy action thrillers Dhurandhar (2025) and Dhurandhar: The Revenge (2026), both of which rank among the highest-grossing Indian films.

== Early life ==
Sara was born on 18 June 2005 in Mumbai, to actor Raj Arjun and his wife Sanya Arjun. Her family is of Sindhi descent and are native to Bhopal. Her younger brother Suhaan made his acting debut in Dinner, a 2016 short film.

== Career ==
=== Early work as child artist (2006-2024) ===
In 2006, Sara began her career as a child actor, appearing in numerous television commercials, including advertisements for McDonald's. She gained recognition with a Clinic Plus advertisement and was subsequently cast in Deiva Thirumagal (2011), where her performance as Nila received widespread critical acclaim.

She later appeared in the Hindi film Ek Thi Daayan (2013), produced by Ekta Kapoor, and in Tamil films such as Chithirayil Nilachoru and Saivam, the latter earning her further praise.

In 2022 and 2023, Sara played Nandini, younger version of Aishwarya Rai Bachchan's character in two part films: Ponniyin Selvan: I and Ponniyin Selvan: II. Both films rank as the fifth and eighth highest-grossing Tamil film of all time respectively.

=== Lead debut with Dhurandhar and further roles (2025-present) ===
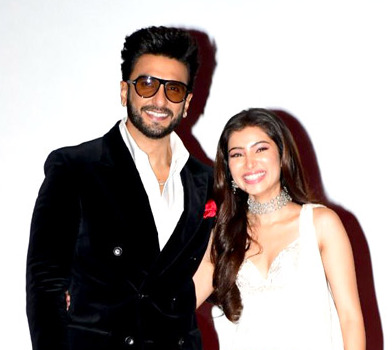
Arjun with co-actor Ranveer Singh at the trailer launch for Dhurandhar in 2025

Sara appeared opposite Ranveer Singh in the Dhurandhar Duology, comprising the spy action thrillers Dhurandhar (2025) and Dhurandhar: The Revenge (2026), directed by Aditya Dhar. The first film marked her debut in a lead role, which she reprised in the sequel. She portrayed Yalina, daughter of a Pakistani politician and Singh's wife. Reviewing the first film, Rishabh Suri of Hindustan Times noted, "Sara Arjun makes a confident debut and holds her own opposite Ranveer." Against expectations, both films achieved record-breaking box office success, with both ranking among Indian cinema's top five highest-earners.

In 2026, Sara also starred in the Telugu film Euphoria, playing a victim of sexual assault. Sangeetha Devi Dundoo of The Hindu stated, "Sara Arjun make the most of the space her roles afforded, signalling promise."

== In the media ==
In October 2026, Sara walked for fashion designer, Anushree Reddy, as a showstopper, at the Lakmé Fashion Week in New Delhi.

== Filmography ==
=== Film ===
Year	Title	Role	Language	Notes	Ref
2011	404	Sara	Hindi	Debut as Child Actress	
2011	Deiva Thirumagal	Nila Krishna	Tamil	Tamil Debut	
2013	Ek Thi Daayan	Misha Mathur	Hindi		
2013	Chithirayil Nilachoru	Oviya	Tamil		
2014	Jai Ho	School Girl	Hindi		
2014	Saivam	Tamizh Selvi	Tamil		
2015	Dagudumootha Dandakor	Bangaram	Telugu	Telugu Debut ; Remake of Saivam	
2015	Jazbaa	Sanaya Verma	Hindi		
2016	Ann Maria Kalippilaanu	Ann Maria	Malayalam		
2017	The Song of Scorpions	Ayesha	Hindi		
2017	Vizhithiru	Charu	Tamil		
2019	Ek Ladki Ko Dekha Toh Aisa Laga	Young Sweety Chaudhary	Hindi		
2019	Saand Ki Aankh	Shefali Tomar	Hindi		
2019	Sillu Karupatti	Mity	Tamil	Anthology film; segment "Pink Bag"	
2021	Ajeeb Daastaans	Samaira	Hindi	Anthology film; segment "Ankahi"	
2022	Toolsidas Junior	Pia	Hindi		
2022	Ponniyin Selvan: I	Young Nandini	Tamil		
2023	Ponniyin Selvan: II	Young Nandini	Tamil		
2024	Quotation Gang Part 1	Iraa	Tamil	Debut as Lead Actress in Tamil	
2025	Dhurandhar	Yalina Jamali	Hindi	Debut as Lead Actress in Hindi	
2026	Euphoria	Chaitra	Telugu	Debut as Lead Actress in Telugu	
2026	Dhurandhar: The Revenge	Yalina Jamali	Hindi		

=== Short film ===
Year	Title	Role	Language	Ref.
2010	Misha	Misha	Hindi	
2018	The Perfect Girl	Shasha	Hindi	
2016	Daughter	Gopal Datt's daughter	Hindi	
2023	Paath (The Lesson)	Kamli	Hindi	

=== Web series ===
Year	Title	Role	Language	Ref.
2019	Parchayee	Usha	Hindi	Episode 2: The Wind on Haunted Hill

== Awards and nominations ==
Year	Award	Category	Film	Result	Ref.
2011	6th Vijay Awards	Best Child Artist – Special Jury Mention	Deiva Thirumagal	Won	
2013	3rd South Indian International Movie Awards	Best Child Artist	Chithirayil Nilachoru	Nominated	
2014	9th Vijay Awards	Best Child Artist	Saivam	Won	
2016	19th Asianet Film Awards	Best Child Artist	Ann Maria Kalippilaanu	Nominated	
2026	Screen Awards	Breakthrough New Actor – Female	Dhurandhar	Nominated	
