= Laggam Time =

2026 Telugu-language romantic comedy film

- Theatrical release poster
- Directed by: Prajoth K. Vennam
- Written by: Prajoth K. Vennam
- Screenplay by: Prajoth K. Vennam
- Produced by: K. Hima Bindu
- Starring: Rajesh Meru; Navya Chityala
- Cinematography: Pavan Guntuku
- Music by: Pavan
- Production company: 20th Century Entertainments
- Release date: 6 February 2026
- Country: India
- Language: Telugu

Laggam Time is a 2026 Indian Telugu-language romantic comedy film written and directed by Prajoth K. Vennam and produced by K. Hima Bindu under the banner 20th Century Entertainments. The film stars Rajesh Meru and Navya Chityala in the lead roles and was theatrically released on 6 February 2026.

== Plot ==
Set against the backdrop of a traditional Telugu wedding, Laggam Time follows a series of humorous and emotional events that unfold during a crucial phase of the ceremony. The narrative blends romance, situational comedy, and family drama, highlighting relationships, misunderstandings, and time-sensitive decisions during wedding celebrations.

== Cast ==
- Rajesh Meru as Surya
- Navya Chityala as Ananya
- Sudharshan as Chandu, Ananya’s fiancee
- Praneeth Reddy Kallem as Bobby, Surya’s bestfriend
- Kedar Shankar as Chandu’s father
- Srinivas Bhogireddy as Ananya’s father
- Sujatha Gosukonda as Ananya’s mother
- Madhumani as Chandu’s mother
- Kiran Macha as Sekhar, Ananya’s brother
- Neela Ramana as Nithya, Ananya’s sister-in-law
- Preetei Sundar as Indu, Chandu’s girlfriend
- Arun Pulivarthi as Madhav, Surya’s friend
- Mirchi Kiran as Police SI

== Production ==
The first-look poster of the film was unveiled by director Sagar K. Chandra, drawing attention to its wedding-centric theme. Principal photography was completed in 2025.

== Music ==
The film's music is composed by Pavan. The song "O Kadhagaa Modalai" was released as part of the promotional campaign.

== Release ==
Laggam Time was released theatrically on 6 February 2026.

== Reception ==
The Hans India called it a wholesome romantic comedy with strong family appeal. NTV rated the movie 2.5/6 stars.
