= Oka Court Case =

2026 Indian Telugu-language romantic drama film

- Theatrical release poster
- Directed by: Ganesh Pudi
- Written by: Ganesh Pudi
- Produced by: Ganesh Pudi
- Starring: Suryaansh Ayila; Tanisha Mishra; Prudhvi Raj; Satya Krishnan; Dayanand Reddy; Mukhtar Khan; Gurpreet Singh
- Cinematography: Dhaaran Sukre
- Edited by: Vinay Ramaswamy
- Music by: Harsha Prawin
- Production company: Open Eyes Entertainment
- Release date: 17 July 2026
- Running time: 136 minutes
- Country: India
- Language: Telugu

Oka Court Case is a 2026 Indian Telugu-language romantic drama film written, directed and produced by Ganesh Pudi under the banner of Open Eyes Entertainment. The film stars Suryaansh Ayila, Tanisha Mishra, Prudhvi Raj, Satya Krishnan, Dayanand Reddy and Mukhtar Khan. It was released theatrically on 17 July 2026.

== Plot ==
The film follows a young man whose romantic relationship comes to an end after his partner decides that they are incompatible. After the breakup, he approaches the court seeking justice over what he considers an injustice in the relationship.

The story combines romance with courtroom drama and focuses on the conflict arising from the breakup and the protagonist's attempt to pursue the matter through legal proceedings.

== Cast ==
- Suryaansh Ayila
- Tanisha Mishra
- Prudhvi Raj
- Satya Krishnan
- Dayanand Reddy
- Mukhtar Khan
- Gurpreet Singh
- Ramatheerthapu Apoorva
- Sai Charan Goli
- Ranga Vara Prasad
- Devika Yedurada
- Tamal Adhikary

The film's cast and crew listings include Suryaansh Ayila, Tanisha Mishra, Prudhvi Raj, Satya Krishnan, Dayanand Reddy, Mukhtar Khan, Gurpreet Singh, Ramatheerthapu Apoorva, Sai Charan Goli, Ranga Vara Prasad, and Devika Yedurada.

== Production ==
The film was written, directed and produced by Ganesh Pudi under the Open Eyes Entertainment banner. Nagesh Pudi and Mukesh Pudi presented the film. The teaser was launched by actor Srikanth in June 2026. P.C. Rajarao served as executive producer, while Ashok Dayyala worked as the film's public relations officer.

The film was shot extensively in the Andaman and Nicobar Islands, with nearly 70% of the film filmed at locations including Flag Point, areas near Corbyn's Cove and the Cellular Jail. The remaining portions were filmed in Hyderabad. The film was initially considered under titles including Oka Court Deal and Oka Court Judgement before the title Oka Court Case was adopted.

The technical crew included Harsha Prawin as music director, Dhaaran Sukre as cinematographer and Vinay Ramaswamy as editor.

== Music ==
The film's music was composed, programmed and arranged by Harsha Prawin.

The soundtrack consists of three songs:

Song	Singers	Lyrics
Magajathi Animuthyam	Malavika, Deepu	Harsha Prawin
Mateleni Ragam	Harini Ivaturi, Siddhartha Sandilyasa	Ranjith Kumar Ricky, Venkat Sreeram Kommu
Mamma Mia	Pranavi Acharya, Renu Kumar	Harsha Prawin

The songs Mamma Mia and Mateleni Ragam were released as a full video song and lyrical video respectively.

The songs were composed, programmed and arranged by Harsha Prawin. Flutes were played by Dr. Ramchandramurthy; electric and acoustic guitars by Manideep Hendrix; bass guitar by Prem Siddoju; and saxophone by Tamal Adhikari.

The chorus featured Siddhartha Sandilyasa, Renu Kumar, Aishwarya Daruri, Manisha Pandranki, Lassya and Lasya Mayukha, while the child chorus consisted of Srinija, Hamsini and Shreya. Track singers included Soma Dutta, Vaishnavi, Siddhartha Sandilyasa, Aditya Bheemathati, Sreenidhi and Sindhuja.

Live instruments were recorded at Shree Abheri Studios, Hyderabad, chorus at 512 Studios, Hyderabad, and vocals at Soundroof Studios, Hyderabad. Tummala Abhyuday served as chief recording engineer and premix engineer, while Harsha Prawin handled the final mixing and mastering at HPCS, Hyderabad.

== Release ==
Oka Court Case was released theatrically in India on 17 July 2026 and received an A certificate in India.

== Reception ==
Tenvow rated the film 6 out of 10, praising its premise of taking a breakup into a courtroom setting, the efforts of the lead actors and some courtroom sequences. It criticised the uneven pacing, predictable turns and limited emotional depth.
