= Euphoria (2026 film) =

2026 Indian Telugu film by Gunasekhar

- Theatrical release poster
- Directed by: Gunasekhar
- Written by: Gunasekhar
- Produced by: Neelima Guna; Yuktha Guna
- Starring: Bhumika Chawla; Sara Arjun; Vignesh Gavireddy
- Cinematography: Praveen K. Pothan
- Edited by: Prawin Pudi
- Music by: Kaala Bhairava
- Production company: Guna Handmade Films
- Distributed by: Sri Thenandal Films; Mythri Movie Makers
- Release date: 6 February 2026
- Running time: 150 minutes
- Country: India
- Language: Telugu

Euphoria is a 2026 Indian Telugu-language social drama film written and directed by Gunasekhar. The film features Bhumika Chawla, Sara Arjun and Vignesh Gavireddy in lead roles, while Gautham Vasudev Menon and Nassar play supporting roles. The film's music was composed by Kaala Bhairava with cinematography by Praveen K Pothan and editing by Prawin Pudi. The film was released on 6 February 2026.

The plot draws from a 2022 incident in Jubilee Hills, where five minors from influential families sexually assaulted a 17-year-old girl. After leaving a party at a club, she unsuspectingly entered a vehicle, leading to a brutal sexual assault by the minor boys, which sparked nationwide outrage. Sara Arjun portrays a fictional character inspired by the 17-year-old survivor.

== Plot ==
Chaitra, the plaintiff in a POCSO trial, pointedly asks the judge if it is a crime for girls to enter a pub, questioning why she should live in shame when she was not at fault and had stayed within her boundaries. Though she feels grief and anger as a survivor, she does not flinch from asking these questions. The parents of the minors who sexually assaulted Chaitra try to destroy the evidence of the assault using their influence, except Vindhya Vemulapalli, the mother of Vikas, one of the perpetrators. With the help of video recordings that the four boys took during the incident, a POCSO case is booked, and they are sentenced to life time imprisonment for 20 years.

Vindhya righteously gets her son punished for his brutal crime. After 6 years, she gets him out on parole and tries to prepare him for JEE entrance exam. Since the juvenile system changed Vikas, and he is angry at his mother, he calls his friends and consumes drugs after running away mid-traffic from his mother. Vindhya searches for him, finds him, and brings him home. When he fails to listen, in anguish, Vindhya starts drinking alcohol. Unable to see his mother in such a state, Vikas starts studying for JEE and his mother helps him.

However, the night before the exam, his friends tell him that his mother handed over the phone (he disposed off in his toilet) containing the evidence of him and his friends raping Chaitra to the police commissioner, Jayadev Nair. Because of this, he does not arrive for the exam on time. When he asks why he should do all this, Jayadev asks whether Vikas even regrets what he did, and if he does, why he has not cried once since the trial. Vikas then takes the exam, but since he is a criminal, he must have his name cleared by appearing in front of an IAS officer. That officer is none other than Chaitra.

Though Chaitra remembers everything Vikas and his friends did, she remains professional and interviews him. As he answers all questions correctly, she grants him permission. It is then that Vikas goes to his mother and cries in remorse and grief, while Chaitra watches from afar, gets into her government-provided vehicle, and leaves. Vindhya and Vikas bond over a new beginning, experiencing the real euphoria of life's ups and downs, not the euphoria Vikas and his friends experienced through substance abuse. Vindhya files a lawsuit against herself, holding herself responsible for how her son turned out. After hearing her argument, Judge Surya Narayana Murthy says that Vindhya has already received her punishment and contributed to trying hard and reforming her wayward son.

== Cast ==
- Bhumika Chawla as Vindhya Vemulapalli
- Vignesh Gavireddy as Vikas Vemulapalli, Vindhya's son
- Sara Arjun as Chaitra
- Prithvi Raj Addala as "Psycho" Saahil
- Rohit as Vivek Chakravarthy Vemulapalli, Vikas' father
- Gautham Vasudev Menon as Commissioner Jayadev Nair IPS, later Director Of Telangana Anti-Narcotics Bureau
- Nassar as Justice Surya Narayana Murthy
- Likhita Yalamanchali as Amrutha
- Addala Prudhviraj
- Kalpa Latha
- Sai Srinika Reddy
- Ashrita Vemuganti
- Mathew Varghese
- Aadarsh Balakrishna as C.I. B. Srinivas
- Ravi Prakash
- Raja Ravindra as Jailor Veera Bhadra
- Naveena Reddy
- Likith Naidu

== Music ==
The background score and songs were composed by Kaala Bhairava in his first collaboration with Gunasekhar.

Track listing
No.	Title	Lyrics	Singer(s)	Length
1.	"Fly High"	Kittu Visapragada	Kaala Bhairava, Prudhvi Chandra, Gayathri Natarajan	4:08
2.	"Lokame"	Kittu Visapragada	Kaala Bhairava, Sony Komanduri	4:29
3.	"Rama Rama"	Chaitanya Prasad	Vasa Pavani, Aditya Iyengar, Harsha BV, Rishil	4:08
4.	"Enno Vaasanthaalu"	Kittu Visapragada	BV Harsha, Sindhuja Rajesh	4:06

== Release and reception ==
Euphoria was released on 6 February 2026.

Yashaswini Sri of The Indian Express rated the film 4 out of 5, appreciating Gunasekhar's direction, Kaala Bhairava's score, and the lead cast performances. Sangeetha Devi Dundoo of The Hindu too praised Gunasekhar's work writing that "Gunasekhar delivers a sharp fictional drama rooted in a harrowing true story". In contrast, Suresh Kavirayani of The New Indian Express opined that despite a strong premise, the film loses grip due to flawed narration and inconsistent storytelling.
