= Papam Prathap =

2026 Indian Telugu language film by S. P. Durga Naresh

- Theatrical release poster
- Directed by: S. P. Durga Naresh
- Written by: S. P. Durga Naresh
- Produced by: Gaddam Rakesh Reddy; Rudradev Madhi Reddy
- Starring: Thiruveer; Payal Radhakrishna; Ajay Ghosh
- Cinematography: S. V. Vishweshwar
- Edited by: Anwar Ali
- Music by: Score; Suresh Bobbili; Songs; K. M. Radha Krishnan
- Production companies: Krishi Entertainments; ETV Win
- Distributed by: People Media Factory; Mythri Movie Distributors LLP
- Release date: 17 April 2026
- Running time: 150 minutes
- Country: India
- Language: Telugu

Papam Prathap is a 2026 Indian Telugu-language comedy drama film written and directed by S. P. Durga Naresh. The film stars Thiruveer, Payal Radhakrishna and Ajay Ghosh.

The film was released on 17 April 2026.

== Plot ==
Movie sets to 1998 Godavari region, Pratap marries Bujjamma but she leaves him three days after their wedding. The conflict reaches village elders for resolution which raises as debate to find who is at fault, exploring what happened between the couple in three days.

== Cast ==
- Thiruveer as Prathap
- Payal Radhakrishna as Bujjamma
- Ajay Ghosh as Veerayya, Prathap's father
- Goparaju Ramana as Papa Rao
- Srinivas Avasarala as Dr Subrahmanyam
- Raasi as Prathap's mother
- Devi Prasad as Bujjamma's father
- Ravi Anthony Pudota as Shyam, Prathap’s friend
- Prasad Behara as Botsa
- Raghu Babu as Srinu
- Rupa Lakshmi as Bujjamma's mother
- Ananth Babu as Shyam’s father
- Padmaja Lanka as Shyam’s mother
- Mahaboob Basha as Lacchayya, Photographer
- Sneha Madhuri Sharma as Karuna, Bujjamma’s friend
- Divya Sree as Rani, Paparao’s daughter
- Dasaradh (director) as Dr K.Dasaradh (cameo)

== Music ==
The background score was composed by Suresh Bobbili whereas the songs were composed by K. M. Radha Krishnan.

Track listing
No.	Title	Lyrics	Singer(s)	Length
1.	"Pillekkadundi"	Suddala Ashok Teja	Ram Miriyala, Harini Ivaturi, K.M. Radha Krishnan	4:05

== Release ==
Papam Prathap was released on 17 April 2026. It was distributed by People Media Factory and Mythri Movie Distributors LLP for the theatrical release. The film was released on 7 May 2026 on ETV Win.

== Reception ==
Suresh Kavirayani of The New Indian Express rated the film 2.5 out of 5 and opined that with tighter writing and better narrative control, it could have been a much more engaging film. Srivathsan Nadadhur of The Hindu that the film "is a reminder of a persistent problem with Telugu cinema — a sensitive issue downplayed by over-simplified, insensitive treatment". Bhawana Tanmayi from Moneycontrol said that "Papam Prathap is a light-hearted drama that works because of its situational comedy and Thiruveer's earnest performance, even if the narrative takes a predictable path".
