= Jayannth & the Jingo Pen =

- Movie Poster
- Directed by: Naveen Desaboina
- Produced by: Divya Praveen Bolisetty
- Starring: Master Jayannth Bolisetty; Tanikella Bharani; Satyam Rajesh; Uha Reddy
- Cinematography: Andrew Babu
- Music by: Mohit Kulkarni
- Production company: Namo Jayam Productions
- Release date: 14 November 2026
- Country: India
- Language: Telugu

Jayannth & the Jingo Pen is a 2026 Indian Telugu-language children's fantasy family drama film directed by Naveen Desaboina. The film is produced by Divya Praveen Bolisetty and co-produced by MD Shafi Shine, under the banner Namo Jayam Productions. The film stars Master Jayannth Bolisetty, Tanikella Bharani, Satyam Rajesh, and Uha Reddy.

The music for the film is composed by Mohit Kulkarni. The cinematography is handled by Andrew Babu.

== Plot ==
Jayanth (Master Jayannth Bolisetty) is a school boy who struggles with mathematics and often comes late to school. Because of this Jayannth faces strict punishments from his mathematics teacher, Harsha (Satyam Rajesh), and ridicule from those around him. Along with this, his mischievous behavior and frequent involvement in fights cause difficulties for his parents (Ashish Gandhi and Manasa Radhakrishna).

While the things are going this way, Jayannth finds a mysterious Jingo pen. How his life takes a turn because of the Jingo Pen forms the rest of the story.

== Cast ==
- Master Jayannth Bolisetty.
- Tanikella Bharani as grandfather.
- Satyam Rajesh as maths teacher, Harsha.
- Baby Uha Reddy
- Ashish Gandhi as Jayannth's father.
- Manasa Radhakrishnan as Jayannth's mother.
- Kasi Viswanath as school principal.
- Ashok Kumar.
- Manik Reddy.
- Srikanth Reddy.
- Venkat Reddy.

== Production ==
On 5 September 2026 the first look poster of the film is unveiled by Maram Pavitra, a National Best Teacher Award recipient. The trailer was released on 30 October 2026 in a private school, with MLC Sripal Reddy attending as chief guest.

On 12 November 2026 a pre-release event for the film is held. Speaking during the event, the producer Divya Praveen Bolisetty, mentioned that they made the film after buying the remake rights from the Malayalam filmmakers.

The director Naveen Desaboina spoke about his film and said that the film reduced the price from 250 Rs to 150 Rs for the children film that is releasing on Children's Day.

On 14 November 2026 the film is released.

== Soundtrack ==
Music of the film is composed by Mohit Kulkarni. The tunes and the lyrics for the songs were provided by Praveen Bolisetty.

All tracks are written by Praveen Bolisetty.

No.	Title	Lyrics	Music	Singer(s)	Length
1.	"Nee Snehabandham"	Praveen Bolisetty	Mohit Kulkarni	Javed Ali	3:42
2.	"Adi Padi"	Praveen Bolisetty	Mohit Kulkarni	Javed Ali	3:33
3.	"Depression"	Praveen Bolisetty	Mohit Kulkarni	Harshavardhan Wavare	1:42
4.	"Naa Kanupaape"	Praveen Bolisetty	Mohit Kulkarni	Chinmayi Sripada
Total length:					8:57

== Reception ==
Suhas Sistu of Hans India gave the film 3/5 stars praising Master Jayannth Bolisetty's natural performance and Satyam Rajesh's well written character and portrayal. He also stated that the director Naveen Desaboina's creative and emotional exploration of children's fears is praiseworthy.

The reviewer of Namasthe Telangana gave the film 3/5 stars, praising its humorous first half, the engaging developments following the introduction of the Jingo Pen, the emotional scenes between Jayannth and his grandfather, and the films thought-provoking climax.

TA Kiran Kumar Sharma of Zeenews Telugu gave the film 3/5 stars, praising its natural looking visuals, music, songs, and lyrics by Praveen Bolisetty. He also praised the art direction, costumes, editing, and the production values.
