= Kalpa Latha =

Indian actress

- Born: 19 January 1977 (age 49); Manuguru, Andhra Pradesh, India (now in Telangana, India)
- Occupation: Actress
- Years active: 2010–present

Kalppa Latha Garllapati (born 19 January 1977), credited as Kalpa Latha, is an Indian actress who predominantly works in Telugu films and television shows. She is best known for her role as Allu Arjun's mother in the Pushpa film series (2021–2024).

== Filmography ==
- All films are in Telugu unless mentioned otherwise

Year	Title	Role	Notes
2010	Vedam		
2011	Rajanna	Villager	
2014	Run Raja Run		
2015	Tungabhadra		
2015	Baahubali: The Beginning	an inhabitant of Mahishmathi / Magizhmathi	Simultaneously shot in Tamil
2016	Express Raja		
2016	Manamantha		
2016	Ism		
2017	Baahubali 2: The Conclusion	an inhabitant of Mahishmathi	
2017	Nene Raju Nene Mantri		
2017	Arjun Reddy		
2018	Bhaagamathie		Simultaneously shot in Tamil
2018	Juvva	Bhogam's wife	
2018	Krishnarjuna Yudham	Riya's mother	
2018	Paper Boy		
2018	Bhairava Geetha	Lakshmamma	Simultaneously shot in Kannada
2019	Yatra		
2019	Nuvvu Thopu Raa	Ramya's mother	
2019	Sita		
2019	Ranarangam		
2019	Marshal	Abhi's mother	
2019	Iddari Lokam Okate	Mahi's mother	
2020	Bheeshma	Maid	
2020	HIT: The First Case	Saraswathi	
2020	Valayam	Disha's mother	
2020	Bhanumathi & Ramakrishna	Ramakrishna's mother	
2020	Coronavirus	Lakshmi	
2020	Solo Brathuke So Better	Virat's aunt	
2021	Ninnila Ninnila	Maya's mother	
2021	Vivaha Bhojanambu	Mahesh's mother	
2021	Seetimaarr		
2021	True		
2021	Gully Rowdy	Patapagalu Latha	
2021	Bro		
2021	Pushpa: The Rise	Parvathamma	
2021	Arjuna Phalguna	Thadodu's mother	
2022	Urvasivo Rakshasivo	Sharadakka	
2023	Waltair Veerayya	Protestor	
2023	Sir / Vaathi	Meenakshi's mother	Simultaneously shot in Tamil
2023	Meter	Arjun’s mother	
2023	Ahimsa		
2023	Ala Ninnu Cheri		
2023	O Saathiya	Arjun's mother	
2023	Gandeevadhari Arjuna	Radhika Varma	
2023	Prema Vimanam		
2023	Salaar: Part 1 – Ceasefire	Surabhi's mother	
2024	Bhoothaddam Bhaskar Narayana	Bhaskar Narayana's mother	
2024	Aa Okkati Adakku		
2024	Yevam	Soumya's mother	
2024	Pushpa 2: The Rule	Parvathamma	
2025	Oka Padhakam Prakaram		
2025	Thandel	Gowramma	
2025	Nidurinchu Jahapana	Jayamma	
2025	Sarangapani Jathakam	K. Devika	
2025	Single	Harini's mother	
2025	Constable	Kashi’s sister	
2026	Euphoria		
2026	Sri Chidambaram Garu	Solomon's mother	

=== Television ===
Year	Title	Network	Notes
	Muhurtha Balam	DD Saptagiri	
	Mogali Rekulu	Gemini TV	
	Ashta Chamma		
	Pratibimbam		
2013–2016	Sravana Sameeralu	Gemini TV	
	Pasupu Kumkuma	Zee Telugu	
	Agni Sakshi	Star Maa	
