= Sri Chidambaram Garu =

2026 Indian Telugu-language film

- Theatrical release poster
- Directed by: Vinay Ratnam
- Written by: Vinay Ratnam
- Produced by: Chinta Vineesha Reddy; Chinta Gopala Krishna Reddy
- Starring: Vamsi Tummala; Sandhya Vasishta
- Cinematography: Akshay Ram Podishetti
- Edited by: Anwar Ali
- Music by: Chandra Sekhar–Ravi Cherukuri
- Production company: Srichakraas Entertainments
- Distributed by: Bunny Vas Entertainments; Vamshi Nandipati Entertainments
- Release date: 6 February 2026
- Running time: 140 minutes
- Country: India
- Language: Telugu

Sri Chidambaram Garu (transl. Mr. Chidambaram) is a 2026 Indian Telugu-language comedy drama film written and directed by Vinay Ratnam (in his feature film directorial debut). The film stars Vamsi Tummala and Sandhya Vasishta.

== Cast ==
- Vamsi Tummala as Solomon "Chidambaram"
- Sandhya Vasishta as Leela
- Gopinath
- Gorla Mahesh
- Vindhya Vibhav
- Shanthi
- Shree Raghu
- Sivakumar Matta as Solomon's assistant
- Kalpa Latha as Solomon's mother
- Arun Kumar
- Tulasi as Leela's mother
- Naidu Moram
- Shankar Rao

== Music ==
The background score and songs were composed by Chandra Sekhar–Ravi Cherukuri.

Track listing
No.	Title	Lyrics	Singer(s)	Length
1.	"Velle Darilona"	Chandra Sekhar	M. M. Keeravani	4:34
2.	"Chinnodi Gundello"	Koti Mamidala, Chandra Sekhar	Karthik, Manisha Eerabathini	3:45
3.	"Nijamena Sad"	Ravi Cherukuri, Vinay Ratnam	Rajashekar Katlakunta	2:45
4.	"Nenela Undaalila"	Koti Mamidala	Pranathi, MG Narasimha	3:46
5.	"Asalu Sangathe Telusuko"	Rahman	Krishna Tejaswi	4:41
Total length:				19:31

== Release ==
Sri Chidambaram Garu was released theatrically on 6 February 2026. The film underperformed at the box office. It was later released on ETV Win on 26 February 2026.

== Reception ==
Suresh Kavirayani of Cinema Express rated the film 3/5 stars and wrote, "Sri Chidambaram Garu is a pleasant rural drama narrated with simplicity and sincerity. Though the second half has a few hiccups, the film feels like a breath of fresh air amid routine violent and mass masala entertainers." Srivathsan Nadadhur of The Hindu wrote, "Director Vinay Ratnam’s simple story comes alive with its delectable imagery, soothing music and impressive performances".

Sanjana Pulugurtha of The Times of India rated the film 3/5 stars and wrote, "It may not be a flawless drama, but it carries a gentle reminder: confidence isn’t about perfect eyes or perfect lives, it’s about finally looking at yourself with kindness, even in a world that has always asked you to hide." A critic from Sakshi Post rated the film 2/5 stars and wrote, "Sri Chidambaram Garu has good intentions but fails to convert them into an engaging film. Its excessive simplicity, sluggish pacing, and lack of strong conflict make it feel stretched and underwhelming."
