= Amma Naaku Aa Abbayi Kaavali =

2026 Indian Telugu-language film

- Theatrical release poster
- Directed by: Sivala Prabhakar
- Written by: Sivala Prabhakar
- Produced by: G. Shailaja Reddy
- Starring: Pawan Mahaveer; Varshika; Suhana; Suman; Rao Ramesh; Rajeev Kanakala; Satya Krishnan
- Cinematography: Mahender M.
- Edited by: Nandamuri Hari
- Music by: Sai Karthik
- Production company: GSR Movie Makers
- Release date: 7 August 2026
- Country: India
- Language: Telugu

Amma Naaku Aa Abbayi Kaavali is a 2026 Indian Telugu-language family Indian family drama. This movie has been directed by Sivala Prabhakar and has been produced by G. Shailaja Reddy under the banner of GSR Movie Makers. In this film, Pawan Mahaveer makes his debut as an actor with Varshika and Suhana with Suman, Rao Ramesh, Rajeev Kanakala and Satya Krishnan in supporting roles.

This movie is centered around a self-made youngster who holds out hope for his missing father to return. His life takes a more complex turn due to a love affair and the unveiling of many secrets from his past.

The movie was released in cinemas on August 7, 2026.

== Plot ==
It is a story of a young man who has achieved his way in life yet dreams of the day when he will get back together with his father. At a personal level, it involves a love triangle and an unspoken secret among his family members.

In the whole story, the protagonist goes through emotional challenges and revelations related to his family. The biggest of all is the mystery that surrounds his father's identity.

== Cast ==
- Pawan Mahaveer
- Varshika
- Suhana
- Suman
- Rao Ramesh
- Rajeev Kanakala
- Rama Raju
- Satya Krishnan
- Sujatha
- Supreethi

Pawan Mahaveer made his acting debut with the film. Later promotional material identified Varshika and Suhana as the female leads, while Suman, Rao Ramesh, Rajeev Kanakala, Rama Raju, Satya Krishnan, Sujatha and others appeared in key roles.

== Production ==
The movie is made by G. Shailaja Reddy from GSR Movie Makers and directed by Sivala Prabhakar. It was the first time Pawan Mahaveer appeared on screen.

This movie began its shooting in Hyderabad in December 2025. During the shoot, the lead actors were said to be Pawan Mahaveer, Suhana, and Meghashree. The movie was said to be a romantic story involving three individuals. Vijayendra Prasad clapped for the muhurat shot, while Ghattamaneni Srinivas pressed the button for the camera.

Varshika and Suhana played the leading ladies roles by June 2026. The film was already in post-production with Mahender M. as the cinematographer and Sai Karthik composing the music for the film.

Sai Karthik was the music director, Mahender M. the cinematographer, Nandamuri Hari the editor, and Rao Sri the co-director of the movie..

The trailer was released at Prasad Labs in Hyderabad in June 2026. Some people from the Telugu movie industry were present, along with the lead actors and production team.

== Release ==
The film was initially announced for a theatrical release on 31 July 2026.

It was rescheduled for release on August 7, 2026. In July 2026, an announcement revealed that the film would be released on August 7, 2026, with Pawan Mahaveer being announced as the hero, while Varshika and Suhana were announced as the heroines.

Amma Naaku Aa Abbayi Kaavali was released theatrically on 7 August 2026 in Telugu.

== Reception ==
The film received mixed reviews from critics.

The Hans India described the film as a family drama combining emotion and twists.

News18 Telugu published a review of the film following its theatrical release.

Namasthe Telangana rated the film 3 out of 5 and highlighted its family sentiment, romance, action, music and cinematography.

Times Now Telugu also published a review of the film following its theatrical release.

Sakshi Post described the film as a family drama blending love, emotion and mystery.
