= Thiruveer =

Indian film and stage actor and director

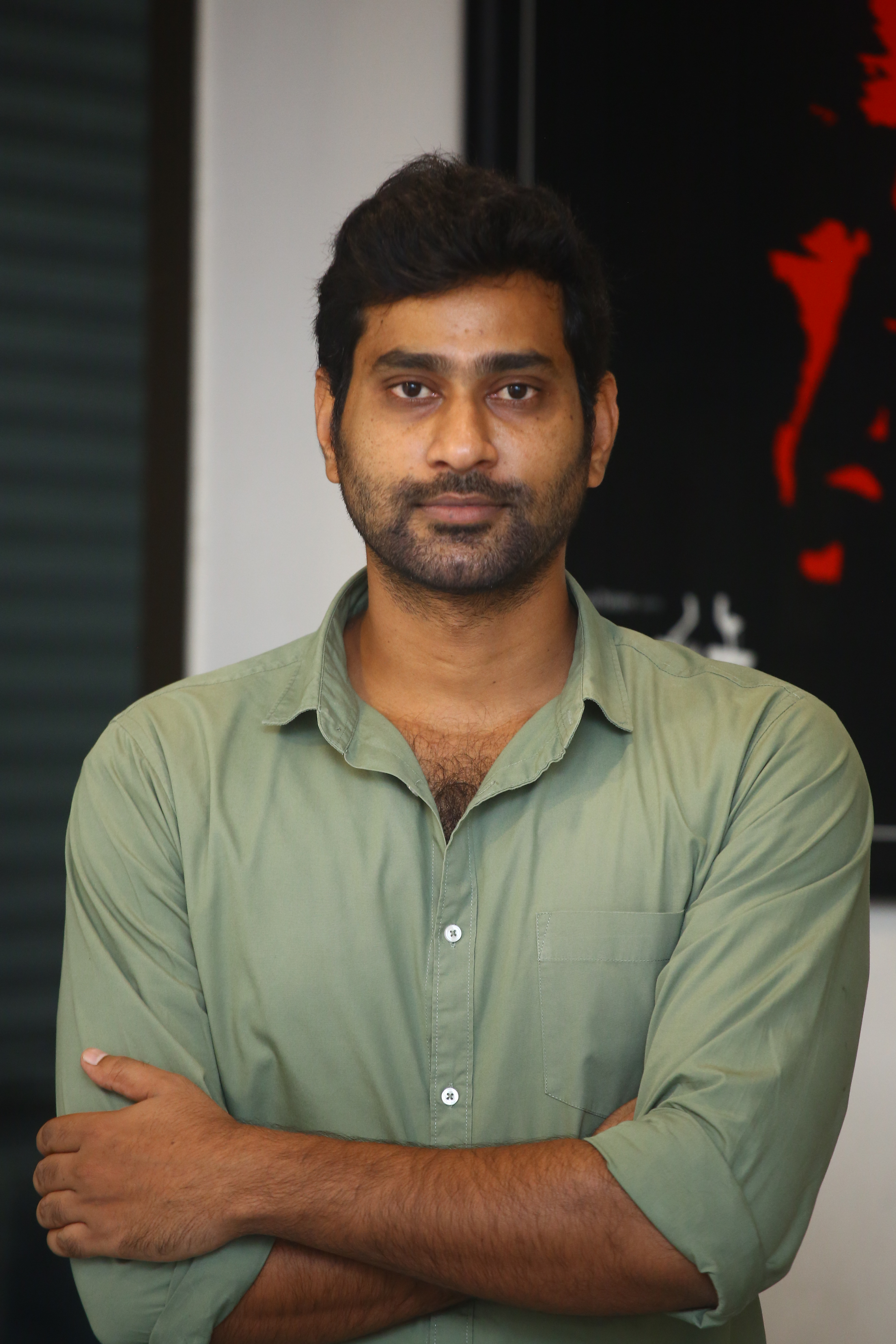
- Born: Tirupathi Reddy; 23 July 1988 (age 38); Mamidipally, Andhra Pradesh (now in Telangana), India
- Occupation: Actor
- Spouse: Kalpana Rao (m. 2024)

Thiruveer P (born 23 July 1988) is an Indian actor and director who works in Telugu films and theatre. His notable works include George Reddy (2019), Palasa 1978 (2020), Masooda (2022) and The Great Pre-Wedding Show (2025).

== Personal life ==
Thiruveer married Kalpana Rao on 21 April 2024 in an intimate and private wedding ceremony at the holy Tirumala Temple.

== Career ==
He worked as a part-time radio jockey for AIR FM Rainbow 101.9 Hyderabad in 2012-2013 as RJ Thiru.

== Filmography ==
Key
†	Denotes films that have not yet been released

Year	Title	Role	Notes	Ref.
2016	Bommalaramaram	Mallesh	Debut film	
2017	Ghazi	V. Murthy	Simultaneously shot in Hindi	
2017	Ye Mantram Vesave	Hari		
2018	Subhalekha + Lu	Parimal		
2019	Mallesham	Veeraprathap		
2019	George Reddy	Lalan Singh	Zee Cine Award Telugu for Best Performance in a Negative Role	
2020	Palasa 1978	Rangarao	Nominated – SIIMA Award for Best Supporting Actor – Telugu; Nominated – Filmfare Award for Best Supporting Actor – Telugu	
2021	Tuck Jagadish	Tirumala "Tiru" Naidu		
2022	Masooda	Gopi Krishna		
2023	Pareshan	Isaac		
2025	The Great Pre-Wedding Show	Ramesh		
2026	Papam Prathap	Pratap		
2026	Oh..! Sukumari			
2026	Srimathi (2026)			
TBA	Bhagavanthudu †	TBA	Filming	

=== Television ===
Year	Title	Role	Network	Ref.
2020	Sin	Anand	Aha	
2020	Metro Kathalu	Chandu	Aha	
2023	Kumari Srimathi	Abhinav "Abhi"	Amazon Prime Video	
2025	Moksha pattam		Aha	

=== Theatre ===
==== As actor ====
- Gograhanam
- Barbareekudu
- Kayitham Puli
- Kidinaap (Vijay Tendulkar's missing father)
- Annihilation Of Caste
- New Bharat Cafe
- Kalyani
- Zoo Story
- Antigone
- Kishor Shanthabai Kaale
- Tax Free
- Razakar

==== As a director ====
- Amma Cheppina Katha
- Naa Valla Kaadhu
- Daawat
- A Man With a Lump
- Pushpalatha Navvindhi

== Honors ==
He was felicitated with the J. V. Narasimha Rao young theatre scholar award for the year 2017, from Potti Sreeramulu Telugu University for his contribution to theatre.
