= Operation Padma =

Indian Telugu-language political crime thriller film

- Theatrical release poster
- Directed by: Karthikeya V
- Produced by: Ghattamaneni Arvind Babu; Raghava Mandalapu; Rambabu Mandalapu
- Cinematography: Kalyan Sami; Pavanmani
- Edited by: JK Frames
- Music by: Subhash Anand
- Production company: Krishav Cinemas
- Release date: 6 February 2026
- Country: India
- Language: Telugu

Operation Padma is a 2026 Indian Telugu-language political crime thriller film directed by Karthikeya V. The film is produced by Ghattamaneni Aravind Babu, Raghava Mandalapu, and Rambabu Mandalapu. It features an ensemble cast including Naresh Medi, Rajitha Sandy, Ranadheer Beesu, KT Mallikarjuna, and Raghupathi Reddy. The movie was released in theaters on 6 February 2026.

The film is edited by JK Frames. Music is composed by Subhash Anand. Cinematography is Kalyan Sami and Pavanmani.

== Plot ==
The story revolves around Nandi Kishore, a former Home Minister who turns into a whistleblower after uncovering a massive corruption scandal within the state's Civil Supplies department. By exposing this scam, he gains immense popularity among the public but simultaneously becomes a primary target for a powerful political mafia. To eliminate him, his enemies hire Kuldeep, a stylish and ruthless professional assassin known for never failing his missions. In response to this threat, a specialized private detective unit is formed under the code name "Operation Padma," which is spearheaded by Avantika. The narrative unfolds as a tense psychological mind game and a cat-and-mouse chase between the cold-blooded assassin and the detective team as they attempt to protect the whistleblower and uncover the mastermind behind the conspiracy.

== Cast ==
- Ranadheer Beesu as Kuldeep
- Rajitha Sandy as Avantika
- Raghupathi Reddy Gunda
- Naresh Medi
- KT Mallikarjuna

== Production ==
The film was made with a high budget, and critics noted that the heavy financial investment is clearly visible on screen. Cinematography was handled by Kalyan Sami and Pavanmani, who successfully created a moody and tense visual palette suitable for a surveillance thriller. The film's gripping background score was composed by Subhash Anand, while the editing was done by JK Frames. Akhil Nakirekanti choreographed the stunts, deliberately focusing on raw and realistic action sequences rather than over-the-top spectacle.

== Reception ==
Upon its release, Operation Padma got mixed to moderately positive reviews, with critic ratings ranging from 2 to 2.75 out of 5 stars.

The reviewer from 10TV gave the film 2 out of 5 stars and stated that while the scenes between the killer and the Operation Padma team are like moves and counter-moves, the film's presentation should have been written with more clarity.

The reviewer from HMTV gave the film 2.5 out of 5 stars, and stated that the almost 90-minute first half is thrilling and the cat-and-mouse game between the killer and the detective team is the film's main strength."

The reviewer from Zee news Telugu gave the film 2.5 out of 5 stars, and stated that the overall, the movie feels like a mind game to the audience." The reviewer commended the female cast by stating, "All women characters look highly energetic.

The reviewer from The Hans India gave the film 2.75 out of 5 stars, and stated that Operation Padma works not just as a thriller, but as a layered investigative drama. He highlighted the performances by stating that Randheer Beesu delivers a chilling performance and the female characters are confident, intelligent, and fearless.
