= Rupayanamaha =

- Theatrical release poster
- Directed by: Arvind Reddy
- Written by: Arvind Reddy
- Produced by: Pavani Sagi
- Starring: Aravind Pandrate; Sravani Malkani; Venu Polsani; D. Anudeep
- Cinematography: J. Varun Naidu
- Edited by: Ravi Teja Girijala
- Music by: Rishi. M.
- Production company: Chitra Veda Productions
- Release date: 2 October 2026
- Running time: 133 minutes
- Country: India
- Language: Telugu

Rupayanamaha is an Indian Telugu-language Financial Crime Drama film that was directed by Arvind Reddy, and is produced by Pavani Sagi under the banner Chitra Veda Productions. The film stars Aravind Pandrate in the lead role, alongside Sravani Malkani, Venu Polsani, and D. Anudeep.

Rishi. M. composed the music for the film. Jinka Varun Naidu handled the cinematography. Ravi Teja Girijala edited the film.

== Plot ==
Hari Narayana is leading his life as a common man in a village along with his wife and his daughter. While he is struggling financially to provide for his family, lady luck smiled on him through a lottery win. The lottery ticket which he bought is now promising a reward of one crore Rupees. But just when he thought that he has overcome his financial problems with the lottery win, an unexpected twist takes place. The lottery ticket which won him a one crore rupees goes missing.

While Hari and his family members are desperately searching for the lottery ticket, Hari receives a phone call from an unknown person, who informs Hari that he has the lottery ticket, and blackmails by saying that he will return the lottery ticket if Hari gives him 10 lakh Rupees. Who is the unknown person? How did he get the lottery ticket? How Hari dealt with the person who demanded 10 lakh rupees from him? In what circumstanes Hari managed to retrieve the lottery ticket, and what kind of situations his family faced in that process, forms the rest of the story.

== Cast ==
- Aravind Pandrate as Hari Narayana
- Sravani Malkani
- Venu Polsani
- D. Anudeep
- Krack Sri Mani
- Vishan Sri
- Kavya Sri Madisetti

== Production ==
On 15 September 2026, Tharun Bhascker has unveiled the first look poster of the film. In September the film completed its censor board certification formality and was given U/A rating by the censor board.

The movie released on 2 October 2026.

== Music ==
Rishi. M. scored the music for the film.

All tracks are written by Koti Mamidala.

Track Listing
No.	Title	Lyrics	Singer(s)	Length
1.	"Rupayanamaha Title Song"	Koti Mamidala	Rishi M, Konda Jitesh Krishna Sai	3:23
2.	"Frustration"	Koti Mamidala	Koti Mamidala	3:41
Total length:				7:04

== Reception ==
Sunil Boddula of News18 gave the film 2.75 out of 5 rating and stated, "Until the lottery ticket goes missing the pacing of the movie was slow... but the movie is entertaining with an interesting concept and humor that naturally developed from the innocent people of the village."

Kiran Kumar of Zeenews gave the film 2.75 out of 5 rating and stated, "Director Arvind Reddy situated the scenes in the real settings of village, making it feel more natural. Despite the actors being debutants they did natural acting. Aravind Pandrate involved well into the role of a common man who is suffering from family issues."

Chetupalli Sanjeev Kumar of Hindustantimes gave the film 2.5 out of 5 rating and stated, "In the first half the editor should have crisply edited the scenes where the family was searching for the missing lottery ticket. In the second half the pace picked up when the story moves out of the house and includes the entire village."
