= Tatvam =

- Theatrical release poster
- Directed by: Arjun Kola
- Written by: Arjun Kola
- Produced by: Seemakurthi Vamsi Krishna; Swetha Pasupuleti
- Starring: Dinesh Tej; Dashvika
- Cinematography: Bharath Patti
- Edited by: Viplav Nyshadham
- Music by: Chaitan Bharadwaj
- Production companies: Trayathi Ishani Creations; SK Productions
- Release date: 2 October 2026
- Country: India
- Language: Telugu

Tatvam is an Indian Telugu-language murder mystery thriller film that was directed by Arjun Kola, and was produced by Seemakurthi Vamsi Krishna and Swetha Pasupuleti under the banner Trayathi Ishani Creations and S. K. Productions. The film stars Dinesh Tej and Dashvika in lead roles, while Sukku Reddy, Anand Bharathi, and Jabardasth Krishna acted in supporting roles.

Bharath Patti handled the cinematography. Chaitan Bharadwaj scored the music for the film. Viplav Naishadham edited the film.

== Plot ==
Kalyan is a police constable who aspires to become a subinspector. While waiting for the results of the written exam for subinspector job, Kalyan goes to the Ramapuram village to meet a young woman in a matchmaking ceremony. In the village he sees Soumya and falls in love with her.

In the same village, a middle aged couple Murthy and Nagamani are living as farmers. Their son Sudha suffers from mental illness. The people in the village find Murthy and Nagamani dead in mysterious circumstances. The villagers conclude that Sudha killed them, so they beat him and complain against him to the police. As Kalyan is in the same village at that time, the subinspector orders Kalyan to do an investigation and write a report about their deaths.

While he is investigating, Soumya tells Kalyan that Sudha may not have committed the murder. When Kalyan could not find conclusive evidence about the murder even after two days of investigation, the subinspector tells Kalyan to take Sudha into custody and bring him to police station. After Kalyan takes Sudha to the police station, he discovers some suspicious evidence that makes him realize that there is more to this case. So, he returns to Ramapuram again and resumes the investigation. The couple's murderer is revealed.

== Cast ==
- Dinesh Tej as Kalyan
- Dashvika as Soumya
- Sukku Reddy
- Anand Bharathi
- Jabardasth Krishna
- Bhogireddy Srinivas
- Pramodini

== Production ==
On 26 June 2026 the trailer of the film was released.

While the cast promoted the film, the lead actors Dinesh Tej and Dashvika met with a car accident, resulting in a slight delay.

The film was released on 2 October 2026.

== Music ==
Chaitan Bharadwaj scored the music for the film.

All tracks are written by Bhaskarabhatla.

Track Listing
No.	Title	Lyrics	Singer(s)	Length
1.	"Oopirantha Ivvale"	Bhaskarabhatla	Anurag Kulkarni	3:03
2.	"Hey Choodu Choodu"	Bhaskarabhatla	Hymath Mohammed	3:20
Total length:				6:23

== Reception ==
Kiran Kumar Sharma of Zee News Telugu gave the film 2.75/5 stars and stated, "The original score and cinematography of the film are good, but it would've been even better if the editor edited the film more crisply."

Lakshminarayana of TV9 Telugu stated, "Dinesh Tej suited well in the role of Constable Kalyan. He brought good depth to the character with his acting. Dashvika did her role well as a beautiful village girl."

Aithagoni Raju of Asianet News gave the film 2.5/5 stars and stated, "Director Arjun Kola tried to weave a unique story by connecting the spiritual and philosophical aspects to the murder investigation. The way the mystery behind the murder is revealed is interesting. The pacing the screenplay should've been better."

Chinthakindhi Ramu of Times Now gave the film 3/5 stars and stated, "Audience who like mystery thrillers will like this movie".
