= Uttutta Herolu =

2026 Indian Telugu-language film

- Theatrical release poster
- Directed by: Harsha Kodali
- Written by: Harsha Kodali
- Produced by: Mahesh Vitta; Kaushik Reddy
- Starring: Mahesh Vitta; Thanu Konidela; Hara Srinivas; Walter Vinay; Praveena Sony; Ganga Chitikala
- Cinematography: Harsha Kodali
- Edited by: Chota K. Prasad
- Music by: John K. Joseph
- Production companies: MVM Pictures; Laxmi Narayana Movies
- Distributed by: Laxminarayana movies
- Release date: 27 February 2026
- Country: India
- Language: Telugu

Uttutta Herolu is a 2026 Indian Telugu-language crime comedy thriller film written and directed by Harsha Kodali. The film is produced by Mahesh Vitta and Kaushik Reddy under the banners MVM Pictures and Laxmi Narayana Movies. It stars Mahesh Vitta, Thanu Konidela, Hara Srinivas, Walter Vinay, Praveena Sony, and Ganga Chitikala in lead roles. The film was theatrically released on 27 February 2026.

== Cast ==
- Mahesh Vitta as Chandu
- Thanu Konidela as Sampangi
- Hara Srinivas as Rami Reddy
- Walter Vinay as Tippu
- Praveena Sony as Sonemma
- Ganga Chitikala

== Production ==
The film is written and directed by Harsha Kodali, who also serves as the cinematographer. It is produced by Mahesh Vitta and Kaushik Reddy under MVM Pictures and Laxmi Narayana Movies. Editing is handled by Chota K. Prasad, while the music is composed by John K. Joseph. Bharadwaj Gali worked as lyricist and Nagendra Gopu as dialogue writer.

== Reception ==
A critic from The Hans India rated the film 2.75/5 stars and wrote, "While the pacing slows in parts and the screenplay could be tighter, the film succeeds in delivering relatable humour, friendship-driven emotions, and a feel-good message about dreams and perseverance." A critic from Sakshi Post rated the film 2.5/5 stars and wrote, "While the screenplay could have been sharper and more consistent, the film delivers enough entertaining moments to connect with its target audience."

News18 critic wrote, "Mahesh is the main attraction of the movie Vitta Energy."
