= Jhansi (actress) =

Indian television presenter

- Born: Jhansi Laxmi; Vijayawada, Andhra Pradesh, India
- Occupations: Television presenter, Actress
- Years active: 1994–present

Jhansi Laxmi is an Indian actress, television presenter, theatre practitioner and producer who works in Telugu films and television shows. She made her debut in Telugu cinema in the year 1994. She won nine Nandi Awards.

== Career ==
Jhansi began her film career in the Telugu film industry in 1994 and has since portrayed a wide range of characters, building a reputation for versatility and depth in her roles. Early in her career, she appeared in memorable movies including Egire Paavurama, Chandralekha, Jayam Manadera and Tulasi with her roles spanning from comedic to dramatic. After a short hiatus from films, Jhansi made a notable comeback in 2015 with character roles in films like Pataas. Throughout her career, Jhansi has also worked as a dubbing artist, providing voice work for Telugu-dubbed films.

As a television presenter, she has worked on various Telugu programs over several decades. Her hosting roles have included shows such as "Talk of the Town" on Gemini TV, "Sunday Sandadi" on ETV Telugu, and "Naveena" and "Chetana" on TV9. These programs represent a range of formats including talk shows, entertainment, and game shows. Jhansi has remained active in Telugu television by participating in multiple shows and events as a host.

== Filmography ==
=== As an actress ===
Year	Title	Role	Notes
1997	Egire Paavurama	Saraswati's daughter	
1997	Bobbili Dora		
1997	Aahwanam		
1998	Navvulata	Jhansi	
1998	Pelli Peetalu	Aruna	
1998	Chandralekha	Prasad's wife	
1999	Prema Kosam		
1999	Ravoyi Chandamama	Gowri	
2000	Manoharam	Anand's younger sister	
2000	Jayam Manadera	Bhavani	
2000	Uncle	Gayatri	
2001	Priyamaina Neeku	Aishwarya	
2001	Family Circus	Kantham	
2002	Vooru Manadiraa	Bheemudu's sister	
2002	Sontham	Venkatalakshmi	
2003	Ninne Ishtapaddanu	Visalakshi	
2003	Simhachalam	Vasundhara	
2004	Yagnam	Suri's wife	
2004	Suryam	Suryam's mother	
2005	Bhadra		
2006	Sri Krishna 2006	Mandela's wife	
2006	Pellaina Kothalo	Janaki	
2007	Evadaithe Nakenti	Meena B. Gangadhar	
2007	Tulasi	Kokapeta Aunty	
2008	Ashta Chamma	Mandira Devi	
2008	Swagatam	Supraja	
2009	Maska	Krish's sister-in-law	
2009	Current	Sneha's aunt	
2009	Bangaru Babu		
2009	Aa Intlo		
2010	Maa Nanna Chiranjeevi		
2010	Simha		
2010	Maa Annayya Bangaram	Nandini	
2010	Saradaga Kasepu		
2010	Yemaindi Ee Vela	Avantika's aunt	
2010	Kalyanram Kathi	Sridevi	
2011	Golconda High School	Vikas's mother	
2011	Panjaa	Lakshmi	
2011	Bhale Mogudu Bhale Pellam	Maid Radha Bai	
2012	Racha	Slum Member	
2013	Love Cycle		
2013	Action 3D		
2013	Anthaka Mundu Aa Tarvatha	Latha	
2014	Maaya	Psychiatrist	
2014	Dikkulu Choodaku Ramayya	Gopala Krishna's boss	
2015	Pataas	Mahathi's Sister	
2015	Subramanyam For Sale	Parvathamma	
2016	Soggade Chinni Nayana	Saraswathi	
2016	Speedunnodu	Vasanti's aunt	
2017	DJ: Duvvada Jagannadham	Vignesh's mother-in- law	
2017	Prematho Mee Karthik		
2017	Sapthagiri LLB	Judge Jhansi	
2018	Pantham		
2018	Saakshyam	Soundarya's sister	
2018	Silly Fellows	Vasanthi's mother	
2019	F2: Fun and Frustration	Kanthamma	
2019	Maharshi	Interviewer	
2019	Mallesham	Lakshmi	
2019	Brochevarevarura	Physics teacher	
2019	Edaina Jaragocchu		
2019	Kousalya Krishnamurthy	Savitri	
2019	Manmadhudu 2	Swarnalatha	
2019	Ruler	Village member	
2019	Bhagyanagara Veedullo Gamattu	Batuku Edla Bandi anchor	
2020	Pressure Cooker	Anitha's mother	
2020	Krishna and His Leela	Geetha	
2021	Narappa	Narappa's sister	
2021	Thimmarusu: Assignment Vali	Vasu's mother	
2022	Aadavallu Meeku Johaarlu	Sarita	
2022	F3	Kanthamma	
2022	Ranga Ranga Vaibhavanga	Radha's friend's mother	
2023	Waltair Veerayya	Lawyer	
2023	Dasara	Vennela's Mother	
2023	Anni Manchi Sakunamule	Geetha	
2023	Salaar: Part 1 – Ceasefire	Obulamma	
2024	Happy Ending		
2024	Average Student Nani	Nani's mother	
2024	Mr. Bachchan	Jhansi	
2024	Double iSmart	Poochamma	
2024	Saripodhaa Sanivaaram	Therapist	
2024	Mathu Vadalara 2	Fake Dhamini	
2024	Devaki Nandana Vasudeva		
2025	Akkada Ammayi Ikkada Abbayi	Raja’s mother	
2025	23 Iravai Moodu	Dr. Beena	
2025	Akhanda 2: Thaandavam	NIA Chief	
2025	Jatadhara	Shiva’s aunt	
2026	Anaganaga Oka Raju	Parijatham	
2026	Dacoit: A Love Story	Shanti	Telugu–Hindi bilingual film
2026	Gaayapadda Simham	Bhairav Das’s mother	

=== As a dubbing artist ===
Actress	Title	Notes
Kausalya	Alludugaaru Vachcharu (1999)	
Tabu	Priyaralu Pilichindi (2000)	Telugu dubbed version
Tabu	Idi Sangathi (2008)	
Jyothika	Tenali (2000)	Telugu dubbed version
Trisha	Manmadha Banam (2010)	Telugu dubbed version
Devadarshini	Kanchana (2011)	Telugu dubbed version
Smriti Irani	Jai Bolo Telangana (2011)	

== Television ==
=== As Host ===
- Talk of the Town for Gemini TV
- Sunday Sandadi for ETV Telugu
- Manoyagnam serial for ETV Telugu
- Sarada serial for Gemini TV
- Brain of Andhra for MAA TV
- Pelli Pustakam for MAA TV
- Black (season 1,2&3) for ETV Telugu
- Ko Ante Koti for Gemini TV
- Lakku Kikku for Zee Telugu
- Bangaru kutumbam for Zee Telugu
- Box lo Bangaram for Gemini TV
- Naveena for TV9
- Chetana for TV9
- Starmaa Parivar League for Star Maa
- Start Music for Star Maa
- Starmaa Parivar League (season 2) for Star Maa
- Starmaa Parivar League (Season 3) for Star Maa.

=== As Actress ===
Year	Title	Role	Network
1995–1996	Lady Detective	Roopa	ETV
2001–2007	Amrutham	Sanjeevani “Sanju”	Gemini TV
2021	The Baker and The Beauty	Padma Dasaripalle	Aha
2023	Hostel Days	Canteen aunty	Amazon Prime Video
2024	Miss Perfect	Rajyalakshmi	Disney+ Hotstar
2025	Hometown		Aha

== Awards ==
Nandi Awards

- Best Supporting Actress - Thodu (1997)
- Best Supporting Actress - Jayam Manadera (2000)
- Best Female Comedian - Tulasi (2007)
- Best Female Comedian - Simha (2010)
