= 12th South Indian International Movie Awards =

2024 award ceremony in Dubai

- Awarded for: Excellence in South Indian cinema
- Date: 14–15 September 2024
- Site: World Trade Centre, Dubai, United Arab Emirates
- Hosted by: Adil Ibrahim; Bhavana Balakrishnan; Pearle Maaney; Rishi; Simran Choudhary; Sathish; Shubra Aiyappa; Sudigali Sudheer
- Organized by: Vibri Media Group

Highlights
- Best Film: Telugu – Bhagavanth Kesari; Tamil – Jailer; Malayalam – Nanpakal Nerathu Mayakkam; Kannada – Kaatera
- Most awards: Hi Nanna (6)
- Most nominations: Dasara and Jailer (11)

Television coverage
- Channel: Gemini TV (Telugu); Sun TV (Tamil); Surya TV (Malayalam); Udaya TV (Kannada)
- Network: Sun TV Network

The 12th South Indian International Movie Awards is an awards event that took place at the Dubai World Trade Centre in Dubai, United Arab Emirates, on 14–15 September 2024. The ceremony (12th SIIMA) recognized and honored the best films and performances from Telugu, Tamil, Malayalam and Kannada films released in 2023, along with special honours for lifetime contributions and a few special awards. The nominations were announced in late-July 2024.

The first day of the ceremony (14 September 2024) awarded the best films and performances from the Telugu and Kannada cinema, whereas on the second day (15 September 2024), best films and performances from the Tamil and Malayalam cinema were awarded. Simran Choudhary and Sudigali Sudheer have hosted the Telugu cinema segment. Rishi and Shubra Aiyappa have hosted the Kannada cinema segment. Bhavana Balakrishnan and Sathish have hosted the Tamil cinema segment. Adil Ibrahim and Pearle Maaney have hosted the Malayalam cinema segment.

Hi Nanna is the most awarded film with six awards followed by Jailer with five, 2018, Baby, Dasara, Kaatera and Sapta Saagaradaache Ello – Side A with four, Maaveeran, Ponniyin Selvan: II, and Romancham with three. Hi Nanna is the most awarded Telugu film followed by Dasara. Jailer is the most awarded Tamil film followed by Maaveeran and Ponniyin Selvan: II. 2018 is the most awarded Malayalam film followed by Romancham. Kaatera and Sapta Saagaradaache Ello – Side A are the most awarded Kannada films followed by Kaiva.

Dasara received the maximum acting awards, they are, Best Actor – Telugu, Best Actress – Telugu and Best Supporting Actor – Telugu. Dasara and Hi Nanna, featuring Nani in the lead, won ten awards.

== Main awards and nominees ==
Winners are listed first, highlighted in boldface.

=== Film ===
Best Film
Telugu	Tamil
**Bhagavanth Kesari –** **Shine Screens**; Baby – Mass Movie Makers; Balagam – Dil Raju Productions; Dasara – Sri Lakshmi Venkateswara Cinemas; Hi Nanna – Vyra Entertainments; Virupaksha – Sri Venkateswara Cine Chitra, Sukumar Writings	**Jailer – Sun Pictures**; Leo – Seven Screen Studio; Maamannan – Red Giant Movies; Ponniyin Selvan: II – Madras Talkies, Lyca Productions; Viduthalai Part 1 – Grass Root Film Company, RS Infotainment
Kannada	Malayalam
**Kaatera –** **Rockline Entertainments**; Aachar & Co – PRK Productions; Kousalya Supraja Rama – Kourava Production House, Shashank Cinemas; Kranti – Media House Studio; Sapta Saagaradaache Ello – Side A – Paramvah Studios	**Nanpakal Nerathu Mayakkam – Mammootty Kampany**; 2018 – Kavya Film Company, PK Prime Production; Iratta – Appu Pathu Pappu Production House, Martin Prakkat Films; Kaathal – The Core – Wayfarer Films; Neru – Aashirvad Cinemas
Best Director
Telugu	Tamil
**Srikanth Odela – Dasara**; Anil Ravipudi – Bhagavanth Kesari; Bobby Kolli – Waltair Veerayya; Gopichand Malineni – Veera Simha Reddy; Karthik Varma Dandu – Virupaksha; Sai Rajesh – Baby	**Nelson Dilipkumar – Jailer**; Lokesh Kanagaraj – Leo; Mani Ratnam – Ponniyin Selvan: II; Mari Selvaraj – Maamannan; S. U. Arun Kumar – Chithha; Vetrimaaran – Viduthalai Part 1
Kannada	Malayalam
**Hemanth M. Rao – Sapta Saagaradaache Ello – Side A**; Akash Srivatsa – Shivaji Surathkal 2; Shashank – Kousalya Supraja Rama; Tharun Sudhir – Kaatera; V. Harikrishna – Kranti	**Jude Anthany Joseph – 2018**; Jeethu Joseph – Neru; Jeo Baby – Kaathal – The Core; Lijo Jose Pellissery – Nanpakal Nerathu Mayakkam; Priyadarshan – Corona Papers
Best Cinematographer
Telugu	Tamil
**Bhuvan Gowda – Salaar: Part 1 – Ceasefire**; Dasaradhi Sivendra – Mangalavaaram; Rajeev Dharavath – Month of Madhu; Sathyan Sooryan – Dasara; Shamdat – Virupaksha	**Theni Eswar – Maamannan**; Manoj Paramahamsa – Leo; Ravi Varman – Ponniyin Selvan: II; R. Velraj – Viduthalai Part 1; Vijay Kartik Kannan – Jailer
Kannada	Malayalam
**Shwet Priya Naik – Kaiva**; A. J. Shetty – Kabzaa; Advaitha Gurumurthy – Sapta Saagaradaache Ello – Side B; Mahendra Simha – Ghost; Shekhar S – Bad Manners	**Akhil George – 2018**; Jinto George – Chaaver; Muhammed Rahil – Kannur Squad; Sharan Velayudhan – Pachuvum Athbutha Vilakkum; Theni Eswar – Nanpakal Nerathu Mayakkam

=== Acting ===
Best Actor
Telugu	Tamil
**Nani – Dasara**; Balakrishna – Bhagavanth Kesari; Chiranjeevi – Waltair Veerayya; Dhanush – Sir; Sai Dharam Tej – Virupaksha	**Vikram – Ponniyin Selvan: II**; Rajinikanth – Jailer; Siddharth – Chithha; Sivakarthikeyan – Maaveeran; Vijay – Leo; Udhayanidhi Stalin – Maamannan
Kannada	Malayalam
**Rakshit Shetty – Sapta Saagaradaache Ello – Side A**; Darshan – Kaatera; Dhananjaya – Gurudev Hoysala; Raj B. Shetty – Toby; Ramesh Aravind – Shivaji Surathkal 2; Shiva Rajkumar – Ghost	**Tovino Thomas – 2018**; Basil Joseph – Falimy, Kadina Kadoramee Andakadaham; Joju George – Iratta; Mammootty – Kaathal – The Core, Kannur Squad, Nanpakal Nerathu Mayakkam; Mohanlal – Neru; Suresh Gopi – Garudan
Best Actress
Telugu	Tamil
**Keerthy Suresh – Dasara**; Mrunal Thakur – Hi Nanna; Payal Rajput – Mangalavaaram; Samyuktha – Virupaksha; Shruti Haasan – Veera Simha Reddy; Sreeleela – Bhagavanth Kesari	**Nayanthara – Annapoorani: The Goddess of Food**; Aishwarya Rai Bachchan – Ponniyin Selvan: II; Aishwarya Rajesh – Farhana; Keerthy Suresh – Maamannan; Meetha Raghunath – Good Night; Trisha – Leo
Kannada	Malayalam
**Chaithra J. Achar – Toby**; Meghana Raj – Tatsama Tadbhava; Megha Shetty – Kaiva; Rachita Ram – Kranti; Rukmini Vasanth – Sapta Saagaradaache Ello – Side A; Sindhu Sreenivasa Murthy – Aachar & Co	**Anaswara Rajan – Neru**; Kalyani Priyadarshan – Sesham Mike-il Fathima; Jyothika – Kaathal – The Core; Darshana Rajendran – Purusha Pretham; Manju Warrier – Ayisha; Vincy Aloshious – Rekha
Best Actor in a Supporting Role
Telugu	Tamil
**Dheekshith Shetty – Dasara**; Angad Bedi – Hi Nanna; Brahmanandam – Ranga Maarthaanda; Prithviraj Sukumaran – Salaar: Part 1 – Ceasefire; Ravi Krishna – Virupaksha; Viraj Ashwin – Baby	**Vasanth Ravi – Jailer**; M. S. Bhaskar – Parking; R. Sarathkumar– Varisu; S. J. Suryah – Mark Antony; Vadivelu – Maamannan
Kannada	Malayalam
**Naveen Shankar – Hondisi Bareyiri**; Aravind Iyer – Tatsama Tadbhava; Gopal Krishna Deshpande – Sapta Saagaradaache Ello – Side B; Harshil Koushik – Aachar & Co; Rangayana Raghu – Tagaru Palya	**Hakkim Shah – Pranaya Vilasam**; Alexander Prasanth – Purusha Pretham; Jagadish – Falimy; Lal – 2018; Siddique – Neru
Best Actress in a Supporting Role
Telugu	Tamil
**Kiara Khanna – Hi Nanna**; Rohini – Writer Padmabhushan; Shreya Navile – Month of Madhu; Soniya Singh – Virupaksha; Sriya Reddy – Salaar: Part 1 – Ceasefire; Varalaxmi Sarathkumar – Veera Simha Reddy	**Saritha – Maaveeran**; Abarnathi – Irugapatru; Mullai Arasi – Are You Ok Baby?; Nadhiya – Let's Get Married; Raichal Rabecca – Good Night
Kannada	Malayalam
**Samyukta Hornad – Toby**; Archana Kottige – Hostel Hudugaru Bekagiddare; Chaithra J. Achar – Sapta Saagaradaache Ello – Side B; Kaavya Sha – David; Sathvika Appaiah – Baang	**Manju Pillai – Falimy**; Aima Rosmy Sebastian – RDX: Robert Dony Xavier; Poornima Indrajith – Thuramukham; Remya Nambeesan – B 32 Muthal 44 Vare; Tanvi Ram – 2018
Best Actor in a Negative Role
Telugu	Tamil
**Duniya Vijay – Veera Simha Reddy**; Arjun Rampal – Bhagavanth Kesari; Arvind Swamy – Custody; Prakash Raj – Waltair Veerayya; Shine Tom Chacko – Dasara	**Arjun Sarja – Leo**; Fahadh Faasil – Maamannan; Mysskin – Maaveeran; Vinayakan – Jailer; Sunil Sukhada – Por Thozhil
Kannada	Malayalam
**Ramesh Indira – Sapta Saagaradaache Ello – Side B (Note: The award was taken by Hemanth M. Rao)**; Kaliprasad K P – Hondisi Bareyiri; Naveen Shankar – Gurudev Hoysala; Raj Deepak Shetty – Toby; Ugram Manju – Kaiva	**Vishnu Agasthya – RDX: Robert Dony Xavier**; Arjun Radhakrishnan – Kannur Squad; Biju Menon – Garudan; Vinay Rai – Christopher; Shabeer Kallarakkal – King of Kotha
Best Comedian
Telugu	Tamil
Vishnu Oi **– Mad**; Jeevan Kumar – Keedaa Cola; Naresh – Samajavaragamana; Racha Ravi – Balagam; Satya – Rangabali	**Yogi Babu – Jailer**; Yogi Babu – Maaveeran; Redin Kingsley – Conjuring Kannappan; Sunil – Jailer; Vadivelu – Chandramukhi 2; VTV Ganesh – Dada
Kannada	Malayalam
**Anirudh Acharya – Aachar & Co**; Dharmanna Kadur – Garadi; Kuri Prathap – Nata Bhayankara; Manju Pavagada – Vesha; Mithra – Raghavendra Stores; Nagabhushana – Kousalya Supraja Rama	**Arjun Ashokan and Sajin Gopu – Romancham**; Althaf Salim – Pachuvum Athbutha Vilakkum; Sajin Cherukayil – Padmini; Sandeep Pradeep – Falimy

=== Debut ===
Best Debut Actor
Telugu	Tamil
**Sangeeth Sobhan – Mad**; Abhiram Daggubati – Ahimsa; Narne Nithin – Mad; Ram Nithin – Mad; Virat Karrna – Peddha Kapu 1	**Hridhu Haroon – Thugs**; Kartheekeyan Santhanam – Fight Club; Shakthi Mithran – Yaathisai; Shyam Selvan – Margazhi Thingal; Venkat Senguttuvan – Mathimaran
Kannada	Malayalam
**Shishir Baikady – Daredevil Musthafa**; Prajwal B. P. – Hostel Hudugaru Bekagiddare; Praveer Shetty – Siren; Rajesh Dhruva – Sri Balaji Photo Studio; Sriyaan Mysuru – Bembidada Navika	**Siju Sunny – Romancham**; Devadath V. S. – O.Baby; Kalaiyarasan – Thankam; Munish Sharma – Ramachandra Boss & Co; Shersha Sherief – Little Miss Rawther
Best Debut Actress
Telugu	Tamil
**Vaishnavi Chaitanya – Baby**; Gayatri Bhardwaj – Tiger Nageswara Rao; Iswarya Menon – Spy; Pragathi Srivatsava – Peddha Kapu 1; Sakshi Vaidya – Gandeevadhari Arjuna; Yukti Thareja – Rangabali	**Preethi Asrani – Ayothi**; Malavika Manoj – Joe; Monisha Mohan Menon – Fight Club; Naksha Saran – Margazhi Thingal; Nimisha Sajayan – Chithha; Saniya Iyappan – Irugapatru
Kannada	Malayalam
**Aradhana Ram – Kaatera**; Amrutha Prem – Tagaru Palya; Hrithika Srinivas – Aparoopa; Risha Gowda – Crazy Keerthy; Vrusha Patil – Love	**Anjana Jayaprakash – Pachuvum Athbutha Vilakkum**; Abhirami Bose – Phoenix; Anagha Maya Ravi – Kaathal – The Core; Bhama Arun – Madanolsavam; Zarin Shihab – B 32 Muthal 44 Vare
Best Debut Director
Telugu	Tamil
**Shouryuv – Hi Nanna**; Kalyan Shankar – Mad; Shanmukha Prasanth – Writer Padmabhushan; Srikanth Odela – Dasara; Sumanth Prabhas – Mem Famous; Venu Yeldandi – Balagam	**Vignesh Raja – Por Thozhil**; Ganesh K. Babu – Dada; Ramkumar Balakrishnan – Parking; Vinayak Chandrasekaran – Good Night; Yashwanth Kishore – Kannagi
Kannada	Malayalam
**Nithin Krishnamurthy – Hostel Hudugaru Bekagiddare**; Ramenahalli Jagannatha – Hondisi Bareyiri; Sindhu Sreenivasa Murthy – Aachar & Co; Shashank Soghal – Daredevil Musthafa; Vishal Atreya – Tatsama Tadbhava; Umesh K. Krupa – Tagaru Palya	**Rohit M. G. Krishnan – Iratta**; Jithu Madhavan – Romancham; Roby Varghese Raj – Kannur Squad; Nahas Hidayath – RDX: Robert Dony Xavier; Nikhil Muraly – Pranaya Vilasam
Best Debut Producer
Telugu	Tamil
**Mohan Cherukuri, Murthy K. S., Vijender Reddy Teegala (Vyra Entertainments) – Hi Nanna**; Ajay Bhupathi, Swathi Reddy Gunupati, Suresh Varma M. (A Creative Works, Mudhra Media Works) – Mangalavaaram; K. Vivek Sudhanshu, Saikrishna Gadwal, Srinivas Kaushik Nanduri, Sripad Nandiraj, Upendra Varma (VG Sainma) – Keedaa Cola; Prabu Raja, Yeshwanth Daggumati (Kalaahi Media) – Pindam; Siddharth Rallapalli (Waltair Productions) – Pareshan	**Magesh Raj Pasilian, Nazerath Pasilian, Yuvaraj Ganesan (Million Dollar Studios, MRP Entertainment) – Good Night**; Aditya (Reel Good Films) – Fight Club; Deepak Segal, C. V. Sarathi, Mukesh R. Mehta, Poonam Mehra, Sameer Nair, Sandeep Mehra (Applause Entertainment, E4 Experiments, Eprius Studio) – Por Thozhil; Girish, Manoj (Kavi Creations) – Paramporul; M. V. M Velmohan, Sakshi Singh Dhoni, Sharmila J. Rajaa, Vikas Hasija (Dhoni Entertainment) – Let's Get Married
Kannada	Malayalam
**Ravindra Kumar (Abhuvanasa Creations) – Kaiva**; Arvind S. Kashyap, Nithin Krishnamurthy, Prajwal B. P., Varun Gowda (Gulmohur Films, Varrun Studios) – Hostel Hudugaru Bekagiddare; Chethan Nanjundaiah, Pannaga Bharana, Spurti Anil (Anvit Cinemas, PB Studios) – Tatsama Tadbhava; Ramenahalli Jagannatha (Sunday Cinemas) – Hondisi Bareyiri; Ramya (AppleBox Studios) – Swathi Mutthina Male Haniye	**Girish Gangadharan, Joby George, Johnpaul George (Guppy Films) – Romancham**; Jagadish Palanisamy, Sudhan Sundaram (Passion Studios, The Route) – Sesham Mike-il Fathima; Naisam Salam (Naisam Salam Productions) – Kadina Kadoramee Andakadaham; Priyadarshan (Four Frames Sound Company) – Corona Papers; Vijay Kiragandur (Hombale Films) – Dhoomam

=== Music ===
Best Music Director
Telugu	Tamil
**Hesham Abdul Wahab – Hi Nanna and Kushi**; Devi Sri Prasad – Waltair Veerayya; Santhosh Narayanan – Dasara; Thaman S – Veera Simha Reddy; Vijai Bulganin – Baby	**Anirudh Ravichander – Jailer and Leo**; A. R. Rahman – Ponniyin Selvan: II; Ilaiyaraaja – Viduthalai Part 1; Nivas K. Prasanna – Takkar; Santhosh Narayanan – Chithha (Note: Only one song) and Jigarthanda DoubleX
Kannada	Malayalam
**V. Harikrishna – Kaatera**; Bindhumalini – Aachar & Co; Charan Raj – Sapta Saagaradaache Ello – Side A; Ravi Basrur – Kabzaa; Vasuki Vaibhav – Tagaru Palya	**Vishnu Vijay – Sulaikha Manzil**; Justin Prabhakaran – Pachuvum Athbutha Vilakkum; Nobin Paul – 2018; Sam C. S – RDX: Robert Dony Xavier; Sushin Shyam – Romancham
Best Lyricist
Telugu	Tamil
**Anantha Sriram – "O Rendu Prema Meghaalila" from Baby**; Bhaskarabhatla – "Nuvvu Navvukuntu" from Mad; Kasarla Shyam – "Ooru Palletooru" from Balagam; Krishna Kanth – "Adigaa" from Hi Nanna; Sri Mani – "Ori Vaari" from Dasara	**Vignesh Shivan – "Rathamaarey" from Jailer**; Ilaiyaraaja – "Kaattumalli" from Viduthalai Part 1; Ku Karthik – "Nira" from Takkar; Vivek – "Unakku Thaan" from Chithha; Yugabharathi – "Nenjame Nenjame" from Maamannan
Kannada	Malayalam
**Dhananjaya – "Tagaru Palya Title Track" from Tagaru Palya** (Note: The award was taken by Umesh K. Krupa); Chethan Kumar – "Pasandaagavne" from Kaatera; Dhananjay Ranjan – "Sapta Saagaradaache Ello Title Track" from Sapta Saagaradaache Ello – Side A; Kinnal Raj – "Namaami Namaami" from Kabzaa; Prithvi – "Mellage" from Swathi Mutthina Male Haniye	**Manu Manjith – "Neela Nilave" from RDX: Robert Dony Xavier**; Anvar Ali – "Ennum En Kaaval" from Kaathal – The Core; Muhsin Parari – "Premakkathu Pattu" from Kadina Kadoramee Andakadaham; Vaisakh Sugunan – "Thathamma Chelolu" from Madanolsavam; Vinayak Sasikumar – "Roohe" from Neru
Best Male Playback Singer
Telugu	Tamil
**Ram Miriyala – "Ooru Palletooru" from Balagam**; Adithya RK, Leon James – "Almost Padipoyindhe Pilla" from Das Ka Dhamki; Anurag Kulkarni – "Samayama" from Hi Nanna; Rahul Sipligunj – "Ayyayyo" from Mem Famous; Sid Sriram – "Aradhya" from Kushi	**Sean Roldan – "Naan Gaali" from Good Night**; Anirudh Ravichander – "Badass" from Leo; Haricharan – "Chinnanjiru Nilave" from Ponniyin Selvan: II; Vijay Yesudas – "Nenjame Nenjame" from Maamannan; Vishal Mishra – "Rathamaarey" from Jailer
Kannada	Malayalam
**Kapil Kapilan – "Sapta Saagaradaache Ello Title Track" from Sapta Saagaradaache Ello – Side A**; Adithya RK – "Oh Kavana" from Hondisi Bareyiri; B. Ajaneesh Loknath – "Hostel Hudugaru Protest Song" from Hostel Hudugaru Bekagiddare; Haricharan – "Arre Idu Entha Bhavane" from Gurudev Hoysala; Hemanth – "Yaava Janumada Gelathi" from Kaatera	**K. S. Harisankar – "Venmegham" from 2018**; G. Venugopal – "Ennum En Kaaval" from Kaathal – The Core; Kapil Kapilan – "Neela Nilave" from RDX: Robert Dony Xavier; Mithun Jayaraj – "Naruchiriyude" from Pranaya Vilasam; Vidyadharan Master – "Love You Muthe" from Padmini
Best Female Playback Singer
Telugu	Tamil
**Shakthisree Gopalan – "Ammaadi" from Hi Nanna** (Note: The award was received was Shakthisree on 15 September 2024 during the Tamil cinema segment); Dhee – "Chamkeela Angeelesi" from Dasara; Harika Narayan – "Ravanasura Anthem" from Ravanasura; Sahiti Chaganti, Satya Yamini – "Maa Bava Manobhavalu" from Veera Simha Reddy; Shweta Mohan – "Mastaaru Mastaaru" from Sir	**Shakthisree Gopalan – "Aga Naga" from Ponniyin Selvan: II**; Ananya Bhat – "Kaattumalli" from Viduthalai Part 1; Dhee – "Maamadura" from Jigarthanda DoubleX; Karthika Vaidyanathan – "Kangal Edho" from Chithha; Shweta Mohan – "Vaa Vaathi" from Vaathi
Kannada	Malayalam
**Mangli – "Pasandaagavne" from Kaatera**; Aishwarya Rangarajan – "Pushpavati" from Kranti; Srilakshmi Belmannu – "Kadalanu Kano Horatiro" from Sapta Saagaradaache Ello – Side B; Sunidhi Ganesh – "Doori Laali" from Tatsama Tadbhava; Vijayalaxmi Mettinahole – "Radha Radha" from Kabzaa	**Anne Amie – "Thinkal Poovin" from Pachuvum Athbutha Vilakkum**; Mridula Warrier – "Nerukayil Nin Nerukayil" from Neeraja; Pushpavathy Poypadathu – "Haalaake Maarunne" from Sulaikha Manzil; Shikha Prabhakaran – "Thaaraattayi" from Iratta; Shreya Ghoshal – "Kalapakkaara" from King of Kotha

== Critics choice awards ==
Telugu cinema

- Best Actor – Anand Deverakonda – Baby
- Best Actress – Mrunal Thakur – Hi Nanna
- Best Director – Sai Rajesh – Baby

Tamil cinema

- Best Actor – Sivakarthikeyan – Maaveeran
- Best Actress – Aishwarya Rai Bachchan – Ponniyin Selvan: II
- Best Director – S. U. Arun Kumar – Chithha

Kannada cinema

- Best Actor – Dhananjaya – Gurudev Hoysala
- Best Actress – Rukmini Vasanth – Sapta Saagaradaache Ello – Side A

Malayalam cinema

- Best Actor – Joju George – Iratta
- Best Actress – Jyothika – Kaathal – The Core

== Special awards ==
- SIIMA Lifetime Achievement Award – Vijayakanth (Note: Awarded posthumously; Received by his wife Premalatha Vijayakanth)
- Excellence in Cinema Award – Shiva Rajkumar (Note: For his contributions to Kannada cinema for 50 years)
- Celebrating 20 Years In Cinema – Tamannaah Bhatia
- Sensation of the Year – Sandeep Reddy Vanga
- Rising Star Award – Sundeep Kishan
- Promising Actor (Telugu) – Sumanth Prabhas – Mem Famous
- Entertainer of the Year (Telugu) – Shruti Haasan
- Emerging Producer of the Year (Tamil) – Kannan Ravi Group – Raavana Kottam
- Extraordinary Performer of the Year (Tamil) – S. J. Suryah
- Most Promising Actor (Tamil) – Kavin Raj – Dada
- Entertainer of the Year (Kannada) – Shiva Rajkumar (Note: For his Kannada films Kabzaa, Ghost and Tamil film Jailer.)
- Promising Actress (Kannada) – Vrusha Patil – Love
- Emerging Producer of the Year (Kannada) – Anvit Cinemas and PB Studios – Tatsama Tadbhava

== Superlatives ==
Films with multiple nominations
Nominations	Film
11	Dasara
11	Jailer
10	Hi Nanna
8	2018
8	Kaatera
8	Leo
8	Ponniyin Selvan: II
7	Kaathal – The Core
7	Maamannan
7	Sapta Saagaradaache Ello – Side A
7	Virupaksha
6	Aachar & Co
6	Baby
6	Mad
6	Neru
6	Romancham
6	Veera Simha Reddy
6	Viduthalai Part 1
5	Balagam
5	Bhagavanth Kesari
5	Chithha
5	Hondisi Bareyiri
5	Hostel Hudugaru Bekagiddare
5	Maaveeran
5	Pachuvum Athbutha Vilakkum
5	RDX: Robert Dony Xavier
5	Sapta Saagaradaache Ello – Side B
5	Tagaru Palya
5	Tatsama Tadbhava
4	Falimy
4	Good Night
4	Iratta
4	Kabzaa
4	Kaiva
4	Kannur Squad
4	Kranti
4	Toby
4	Waltair Veerayya
3	Fight Club
3	Gurudev Hoysala
3	Kadina Kadoramee Andakadaham
3	Mangalavaaram
3	Mem Famous
3	Month of Madhu
3	Nanpakal Nerathu Mayakkam
3	Por Thozhil
3	Salaar: Part 1 – Ceasefire
2	B 32 Muthal 44 Vare
2	Dada
2	Daredevil Musthafa
2	Corona Papers
2	Garudan
2	Ghost
2	Irugapatru
2	Jigarthanda DoubleX
2	Keedaa Cola
2	King of Kotha
2	Kousalya Supraja Rama
2	Kushi
2	Let's Get Married
2	Madanolsavam
2	Margazhi Thingal
2	Padmini
2	Parking
2	Peddha Kapu 1
2	Pranaya Vilasam
2	Purusha Pretham
2	Rangabali
2	Sesham Mike-il Fathima
2	Sir
2	Shivaji Surathkal 2
2	Sulaikha Manzil
2	Swathi Mutthina Male Haniye
2	Takkar
2	Writer Padmabhushan

Films with multiple awards
Awards	Film
6	Hi Nanna (Note: Including a non-competitive award (SIIMA Critics Award for Best Actress – Telugu))
5	Jailer
4	2018
4	Baby (Note: Including two non-competitive awards (SIIMA Critics Award for Best Actor – Telugu and SIIMA Critics Award for Best Director – Telugu))
4	Dasara
4	Kaatera
4	Sapta Saagaradaache Ello – Side A
3	Maaveeran (Note: Including a non-competitive award (SIIMA Critics Award for Best Actor – Tamil))
3	Ponniyin Selvan: II (Note: Including a non-competitive award (SIIMA Critics Award for Best Actress – Tamil))
3	Romancham
2	Good Night
2	Iratta
2	Kaiva
2	Mad
2	Pachuvum Athbutha Vilakkum
2	RDX: Robert Dony Xavier
2	Toby

== Presenters and performers ==
Performer	Work
Andrea Jeremiah	Dance
Ashok Galla	Dance
Avika Gor	Dance
Faria Abdullah	Dance
Kavya Thapar	Dance
Neha Shetty	Dance
Pooja Hegde	Dance
Shanvi Srivastava	Dance
Shriya Saran	Dance
