= 3rd IIFA Utsavam =

2024 Indian Telugu film award ceremony

- Date: 27 September 2024
- Site: Etihad Arena, Abu Dhabi, Emirate of Abu Dhabi, United Arab Emirates
- Hosted by: Akul Balaji; Divya Menon; Pearle Maaney; Rana Daggubati; Sathish; Sudev Nair; Teja Sajja; Vijay Raghavendra
- Produced by: Wizcraft International Entertainment

Highlights
- Best Picture: Dasara (Telugu); Jailer (Tamil); 2018 (Malayalam); Kaatera (Kannada)
- Most awards: Ponniyin Selvan: II (10)
- Most nominations: Ponniyin Selvan: II (13)

Television coverage
- Channel: Gemini TV (Telugu); Sun TV (Tamil); Surya TV (Malayalam); Udaya TV (Kannada)
- Network: Sun TV Network

The 3rd IIFA Utsavam is an awards event that took place at the Etihad Arena, Yas Island in Abu Dhabi, United Arab Emirates, on 27 September 2024. Rana Daggubati and Teja Sajja have hosted the Telugu segment. Pearle Maaney and Sudev Nair have hosted the Malayalam segment. Akul Balaji and Vijay Raghavendra have hosted the Kannada segment. Sathish and Divya Menon were later announced as the hosts for the Tamil segment. The nominations were announced on 21 August 2024.

The event was originally scheduled to be held on 6–7 September 2024. Tamil and Malayalam cinema segments were scheduled to be held on 6 September 2024 and Telugu and Kannada cinema segments on 7 September 2024. It was later rescheduled to 27 September 2024 and will be the inaugural event of the IIFA Festival 2024, followed by the 24th IIFA Awards and IIFA Rocks on 28 September 2024 and 29 September 2024 respectively, at the same venue. The technical awards were announced on 17 September 2024.

Ponniyin Selvan: II is the most awarded film with ten awards, followed by 2018, Kaatera and Sapta Saagaradaache Ello – Side A with five, Dasara with three. Dasara is the most awarded Telugu film, followed by Hi Nanna. Ponniyin Selvan: II is the most awarded Tamil film, followed by Jailer. Kaatera and Sapta Saagaradaache Ello – Side A are the most awarded Kannada films. 2018 is the most awarded Malayalam film, followed by Kaathal – The Core and Romancham.

== Winners and nominees ==
=== Main awards ===
==== Telugu ====
Best Picture	Best Direction
Dasara – Sudhakar Cherukuri, producer; Baby – Sreenivasa Kumar Naidu, producer; Bhagavanth Kesari – Sahu Garapati and Harish Peddi, producers; Hi Nanna – Mohan Cherukuri, Murthy K. S. and Vijender Reddy Teegala, producers; Salaar: Part 1 – Ceasefire – Vijay Kiragandur and Chaluve Gowda, producers	Anil Ravipudi – Bhagavanth Kesari; Mahesh Babu Pachigolla – Miss Shetty Mr Polishetty; Prashanth Neel – Salaar: Part 1 – Ceasefire; Sai Rajesh – Baby; Srikanth Odela – Dasara
Performance in a Leading Role – Male	Performance in a Leading Role – Female
Nani – Dasara; Balakrishna – Bhagavanth Kesari; Dhanush – Sir; Nani – Hi Nanna; Naveen Polishetty – Miss Shetty Mr Polishetty; Vijay Deverakonda – Kushi	Mrunal Thakur – Hi Nanna; Anushka Shetty – Miss Shetty Mr Polishetty; Keerthy Suresh – Dasara; Sreeleela – Bhagavanth Kesari; Vaishnavi Chaitanya – Baby
Performance in a Supporting Role – Male	Performance in a Supporting Role – Female
Brahmanandam – Ranga Maarthaanda; Dheekshith Shetty – Dasara; Hyper Aadi – Ravanasura; Jayaram – Ravanasura; Racha Ravi – Balagam	Varalaxmi Sarathkumar – Veera Simha Reddy; Faria Abdullah – Ravanasura; Ramya Krishna – Ranga Maarthaanda; Sriya Reddy – Salaar: Part 1 – Ceasefire; Soniya Singh – Virupaksha
Music Direction	Lyrics
Hesham Abdul Wahab – Hi Nanna; Devi Sri Prasad – Waltair Veerayya; Hesham Abdul Wahab – Kushi; Santhosh Narayanan – Dasara; Thaman S – Veera Simha Reddy	Anantha Sriram – "O Rendu Prema Meghaalila" from Baby; Kalyan Nayak – "Ayyayyo" from Mem Famous; Kasarla Shyam – "Chamkeela Angeelesi" from Dasara; Krishna Kanth – "Adigaa" from Hi Nanna; Shiva Nirvana – "Kushi Title Song" from Kushi
Playback Singer – Male	Playback Singer – Female
Rahul Sipligunj – "Ayyayyo" from Mem Famous; Leon James – "Almost Padipoyindhe Pilla" from Das Ka Dhamki; Hesham Abdul Wahab – "Naa Roja Nuvve" from Kushi; Ram Miriyala – "Chamkeela Angeelesi" from Dasara; Sid Sriram – "Aradhya" from Kushi	Mangli – "Ooru Palletooru" from Balagam; Dhee – "Chamkeela Angeelesi" from Dasara; Chinmayi Sripaada – "Aradhya" from Kushi; Ramya Behara – "Mass Mogudu" from Veera Simha Reddy; Shruti Haasan – "Odiyamma" from Hi Nanna
Performance in a Negative Role
Shine Tom Chacko – Dasara; Duniya Vijay – Veera Simha Reddy; Jisshu Sengupta – Tiger Nageswara Rao; Prakash Raj – Waltair Veerayya; Samuthirakani – Sir

==== Tamil ====
Best Picture	Best Direction
Jailer – Kalanithi Maran, producer; Ayothi – R. Ravindran, producer; Maamannan – M. Shenbagamurthy and R. Arjun Durai, producers; Ponniyin Selvan: II – Mani Ratnam and Subaskaran Allirajah, producers; Viduthalai Part 1 – Elred Kumar, producer	Mani Ratnam – Ponniyin Selvan: II; Lokesh Kanagaraj – Leo; Karthik Subbaraj – Jigarthanda DoubleX; R. Manthira Moorthy – Ayothi; Nelson Dilipkumar – Jailer; Vetrimaaran – Viduthalai Part 1
Performance in a Leading Role – Male	Performance in a Leading Role – Female
Vikram – Ponniyin Selvan: II; Karthi – Ponniyin Selvan: II; Rajinikanth – Jailer; Siddharth – Chithha; Sivakarthikeyan – Maaveeran; Soori – Viduthalai Part 1	Aishwarya Rai Bachchan – Ponniyin Selvan: II; Aishwarya Rajesh – Farhana; Keerthy Suresh – Maamannan; Nayanthara – Annapoorani: The Goddess of Food; Shraddha Srinath – Irugapatru; Trisha – Ponniyin Selvan: II
Performance in a Supporting Role – Male	Performance in a Supporting Role – Female
Jayaram – Ponniyin Selvan: II; Azhagam Perumal – Maamannan; Gautham Vasudev Menon – Viduthalai Part 1; R. Sarathkumar– Ponniyin Selvan: II; Redin Kingsley – Mark Antony	Sahasra Shree – Chithha; Aishwarya Lekshmi – Ponniyin Selvan: II; Ramya Krishnan – Jailer; Raichal Rabecca – Good Night; Saritha – Maaveeran
Music Direction	Lyrics
A. R. Rahman – Ponniyin Selvan: II; Anirudh Ravichander – Jailer; Dhibu Ninan Thomas and Santhosh Narayanan – Chithha; G. V. Prakash Kumar – Aneethi; Ilaiyaraaja – Viduthalai Part 1	Super Subu – "Hukum – Thalaivar Alappara" from Jailer; Ilaiyaraaja – "Kaattumalli" from Viduthalai Part 1; Ilango Krishnan – "Veera Raja Veera" from Ponniyin Selvan: II; Vishnu Edavan – "Naa Ready" from Leo; Yugabharathi – "Nenjame Nenjame" from Maamannan
Playback Singer – Male	Playback Singer – Female
Haricharan – "Chinnanjiru Nilave" from Ponniyin Selvan: II; Anirudh Ravichander – "Hukum" from Jailer; Anirudh Ravichander – "Badass" from Leo; Sean Roldan – "Naan Gaali" from Good Night; Vijay Yesudas – "Nenjame Nenjame" from Maamannan; Vishal Mishra – "Rathamaarey" from Jailer	Shakthisree Gopalan – "Aga Naga" from Ponniyin Selvan: II; Ananya Bhat – "Kaattumalli" from Viduthalai Part 1; Shakthishree Gopalan– "Nenjame Nenjame" from Maamannan; Shilpa Rao – "Kaavaalaa" from Jailer; Shweta Mohan – "Vaa Vaathi" from Vaathi
Performance in a Negative Role
S. J. Suryah – Mark Antony; Arjun Sarja – Leo; Fahadh Faasil – Maamannan; Selvaraghavan – Farhana; Vinayakan – Jailer

==== Malayalam ====
Best Picture	Best Direction
2018 – Venu Kunnappilly, producer; Falimy – Ganesh Menon and Lakshmi Warrier, producers; Kannur Squad – George Sebastian, producer; Neru – Antony Perumbavoor, producer; Romancham – Johnpaul George, producer	Jeo Baby – Kaathal – The Core; Devan Jayakumar – Valatty; Jithu Madhavan – Romancham; Jude Anthany Joseph – 2018; Lijo Jose Pellissery – Nanpakal Nerathu Mayakkam
Performance in a Leading Role – Male	Performance in a Leading Role – Female
Tovino Thomas – 2018; Fahadh Faasil – Pachuvum Athbutha Vilakkum; Joju George – Iratta; Mammootty – Kaathal – The Core; Mammootty – Nanpakal Nerathu Mayakkam; Mohanlal – Neru	Anaswara Rajan – Neru; Jyothika – Kaathal – The Core; Kalyani Priyadarshan – Sesham Mike-il Fathima; Manju Pillai – Falimy; Vincy Aloshious – Rekha
Performance in a Supporting Role – Male	Performance in a Supporting Role – Female
Sudhi Kozhikode – Kaathal – The Core; Indrajith Sukumaran – Thuramukham; Lal – 2018; Siddique – Neru; Narain – 2018	Mamitha Baiju – Pranaya Vilasam; Bindu Panicker – Madhura Manohara Moham; Darshana Rajendran – Thuramukham; Nikhila Vimal – Ayalvaashi; Srinda – Thuramukham
Music Direction	Lyrics
Sushin Shyam – Romancham; Dabzee, Vishnu Vijay – Sulaikha Manzil; Nobin Paul – 2018; Sushin Shyam – Kannur Squad; Vishnu Vijay – Falimy	Joe Paul – "Uyirayi Maarave" from 2018; Joe Paul – "Venmegham" from 2018; BK Harinarayanan – "Arike Koottay Arike" from Valatty; Muhsin Parari – "Mazhavillile" from Falimy; Vinayak Sasikumar – "Mrudhu Bhaave Dhruda Kruthye" from Kannur Squad
Playback Singer – Male	Playback Singer – Female
Sushin Shyam – "Aathmave Po" from Romancham; K. S. Harisankar – "Uyirayi Maarave" from 2018; K. S. Harishankar– "Venmegham" from 2018; Vijay Yesudas – "Niramulloru" from Valatty; Vishnu Vijay – "Mazhavillile" from Falimy	Ezma Nobin – "Innithile" from 2018; K. S. Chithra – "Alivozhukum" from Antony; K. S. Chithra – "Pottithakarnna Kinavu" from Neelavelicham; Madhuvanthi Narayan – "Aadharanjali" from Romancham; Shreya Ghoshal – "Ayisha Ayisha" from Ayisha
Performance in a Negative Role
Arjun Radhakrishnan – Kannur Squad; Biju Menon – Garudan; Roshan Mathew – Dhoomam; Sudev Nair – Thuramukham; Sunny Wayne – Vela

==== Kannada ====
Best Picture	Best Direction
Kaatera – Rockline Venkatesh, producer; Aachar & Co – Ashwini Puneeth Rajkumar, producer; Kousalya Supraja Rama – B. C. Patil, Raghavendra P. S, Ramesha K, Shashank, Shrushti Patil and Vanaja Patil, producers; Sapta Saagaradaache Ello – Side A – Rakshit Shetty, producer; Tagaru Palya – Dhananjaya, producer	Tharun Sudhir – Kaatera; Hemanth M. Rao – Sapta Saagaradaache Ello – Side A; M. G. Srinivas – Ghost; Shashank – Kousalya Supraja Rama; Sindhu Sreenivasa Murthy – Aachar & Co
Performance in a Leading Role – Male	Performance in a Leading Role – Female
Rakshit Shetty – Sapta Saagaradaache Ello – Side A; Darshan – Kaatera; Krishna – Kousalya Supraja Rama; Raj B. Shetty – Toby; Shiva Rajkumar – Ghost	Rukmini Vasanth – Sapta Saagaradaache Ello – Side A; Amrutha Prem – Tagaru Palya; Aradhana Ram – Kaatera; Chaithra J. Achar – Toby; Megha Shetty – Kaiva
Performance in a Supporting Role – Male	Performance in a Supporting Role – Female
Gopal Krishna Deshpande – Sapta Saagaradaache Ello – Side B; Anoop Revanna – Kabzaa; Chikkanna – Raja Marthanda; Kumar Govind – Kaatera; Nagabhushana – Kousalya Supraja Rama	Shruti – Kaatera; Janvi Rayala – Kaiva; Meghana Gaonkar – Shivaji Surathkal 2; Sudha Belawadi – Kousalya Supraja Rama; Tara – Tagaru Palya
Music Direction	Lyrics
V. Harikrishna – Kaatera; Arjun Janya – Kousalya Supraja Rama; B. Ajaneesh Loknath – Hostel Hudugaru Bekagiddare; Charan Raj – Sapta Saagaradaache Ello – Side A; Vasuki Vaibhav – Tagaru Palya	Dhananjay Ranjan – "Sapta Saagaradaache Ello Title Track" from Sapta Saagaradaache Ello – Side A; Chethan Kumar – "Pasandaagavne" from Kaatera; Dhananjaya – "Sambanja Annodu Doddu Kana" from Tagaru Palya; Shashank – "Shivani" from Kousalya Supraja Rama; V. Nagendra Prasad – "Sankranthi Sanjeli" from Kaiva
Playback Singer – Male	Playback Singer – Female
MC Bijju and Kiran Kaverappa – "Horaata" from Sapta Saagaradaache Ello – Side A; Nishan Rai – "Shivani" from Kousalya Supraja Rama; B. Ajaneesh Loknath – "Protest Song" from Hostel Hudugaru Bekagiddare; Prem – "Sambanja Annodu Doddu Kana" from Tagaru Palya; Hemanth – "Manasege Banthu Bittu Hogoke" from Kaatera	Srilakshmi Belmannu – "Kadalanu" from Sapta Saagaradaache Ello – Side A; Aishwarya Rangarajan – "Namaami Namaami" from Kabzaa; Eesha Suchi – "Twinkle Twinkle" from Shivaji Surathkal 2; Madhuri Seshadri – "Suryakanthi" from Tagaru Palya; Vani Harikrishna – "Anuragava Kalisalu" from Kaatera
Performance in a Negative Role
Jagapathi Babu – Kaatera; Abhijith – Ghost; Meghana Raj – Tatsama Tadbhava; Ramesh Indira – Sapta Saagaradaache Ello – Side A; Shishya Deepak – Veeram

=== Technical awards ===
Best Screenplay
- Alfred Prakash, Vignesh Raja – Por Thozhil (Tamil)
Best Dialogues
- Mahesh Babu Pachigolla – Miss Shetty Mr Polishetty (Telugu)
Best Cinematography
- Ravi Varman – Ponniyin Selvan: II (Tamil)
Best Editing
- Ujwal Kulkarni – Salaar: Part 1 – Ceasefire (Telugu)
Best Background Score
- A. R. Rahman – Ponniyin Selvan: II (Tamil)
Best Choreography
- Prem Rakshith – "Chamkeela Angeelesi" from Dasara (Telugu)
Best Production Design
- Thota Tharani – Ponniyin Selvan: II (Tamil)
Best Special Effects (Visual)
- Mindstein Studios – 2018 (Malayalam)

=== Special awards ===
- Outstanding Achievement in Indian Cinema – Chiranjeevi
- Golden Legacy – Nandamuri Balakrishna
- Woman of the Year – Samantha
- Excellence in Indian Cinema – Keerthy Suresh
- Outstanding Contribution in Indian Cinema – Priyadarshan
- Outstanding Excellence in Kannada cinema – Rishab Shetty
- Best Debut – Kannada – Aradhana Ram for Kaatera

== Superlatives ==
Films with multiple nominations
Nominations	Film
13	Ponniyin Selvan: II
11	2018
11	Kaatera
10	Dasara
10	Jailer
9	Sapta Saagaradaache Ello – Side A
8	Kousalya Supraja Rama
7	Maamannan
7	Tagaru Palya
7	Viduthalai Part 1
6	Hi Nanna
5	Falimy
5	Kushi
5	Romancham
4	Baby
4	Bhagavanth Kesari
4	Kaathal – The Core
4	Kannur Squad
4	Leo
4	Neru
3	Chithha
3	Farhana
3	Ghost
3	Kaiva
3	Miss Shetty Mr Polishetty
3	Ravanasura
3	Salaar: Part 1 – Ceasefire
3	Thuramukham
3	Valatty
3	Veera Simha Reddy
2	Aachar & Co
2	Ayothi
2	Balagam
2	Good Night
2	Hostel Hudugaru Bekagiddare
2	Kabzaa
2	Maaveeran
2	Mark Antony
2	Mem Famous
2	Ranga Maarthaanda
2	Shivaji Surathkal 2
2	Sir
2	Toby
2	Waltair Veerayya

Films with multiple awards
Awards	Film
10	Ponniyin Selvan: II
5	2018
5	Kaatera
5	Sapta Saagaradaache Ello – Side A
4	Dasara
2	Hi Nanna
2	Jailer
2	Kaathal – The Core
2	Romancham

== Presenters and performers ==
Performer	Work
Aradhana Ram	Dance
Devi Sri Prasad	Singing
Malashri	Dance
Prabhu Deva	Dance
Pragya Jaiswal	Dance
Raashii Khanna	Dance
Regina Cassandra	Dance
Shane Nigam	Dance
Janhvi Kapoor	Dance
