= Ranga Maarthaanda =

- Poster
- Directed by: Krishna Vamsi
- Written by: Mahesh Manjrekar; Dialogue: Akella Siva Prasad
- Based on: Natsamrat (drama) by V. V. Shirwadkar
- Produced by: Kalipu Madhu; S. Venkat Reddy
- Starring: Prakash Raj; Ramya Krishna; Brahmanandam; Shivathmika Rajashekar; Rahul Sipligunj; Ali Reza; Anasuya Bharadwaj; Aadarsh Balakrishna
- Cinematography: Raj K. Nalli
- Edited by: Pavankumar Vinnakota
- Music by: Ilaiyaraaja
- Production companies: Raja Shyamala Entertainments; Housefull Movies
- Release date: 22 March 2023
- Running time: 150 minutes
- Country: India
- Language: Telugu

Ranga Maarthanda (transl. The Sun of Theatre) is a 2023 Indian Telugu-language drama film directed by Krishna Vamsi. It is a remake of the 2016 Marathi film Natsamrat. The film stars Prakash Raj, Ramya Krishna, and Brahmanandam in the lead roles along with Shivathmika Rajashekar, Rahul Sipligunj, Ali Reza, Anasuya Bharadwaj, and Aadarsh Balakrishna in supporting roles. The film is produced by Kalipu Madhu, S. Venkat Reddy under the banner of Rajashyamala Entertainments, Housefull Movies and Mythri Movie Makers. The film features music scored by Ilaiyaraaja, with cinematography by Raj K Nalli, and editing by Pavan VK.

The film released on 22 March 2023, opening to highly positive reviews praising the performances, proper adaptation of the remake, emotional weight, and direction, as well as noting it as a return to form for Krishna Vamsi.

== Cast ==
- Prakash Raj as Raghava Rao, the king of drama theater
- Ramya Krishna as Raju Garu, Raghava Rao's wife
- Brahmanandam as Chakrapani, Raghava Rao's best friend
- Jayalalita as Chakrapani's wife
- Shivathmika Rajashekar as Bangaram, Raghava Rao's daughter and Rahul's wife
- Rahul Sipligunj as Rahul, Bangaram's husband
- Anasuya Bharadwaj as Geeta, Ranga Rao's wife
- Aadarsh Balakrishna as Ranga Rao, Raghava Rao's son and Geeta's husband
- Ali Reza as Siddharth
- Vamsi Chaganti
- Prabhakar Podakandla
- Satyanand
- Raj Madiraju
- Y. Kasi Viswanath
- Priyadarshini Ram
- Shanoor Sana
- Venu Yeldandi
- Bhadram
- Raja Pakurthi

== Release ==
Ranga Maarthanda was released in theaters on 22 March 2023. It was later made available for streaming on Amazon Prime Video on 7 April 2023.

== Reception ==
Paul Nicodemus of The Times of India wrote, "This emotionally stirring family drama may not have commercial elements, but even with its imperfections, the film will keep the audience hooked and has a universal recall. Actors Prakash Raj and Brahmanandam came up with performances of a lifetime. Watch it".

== Accolades ==
Award (Note: Awards, festivals and organizations are in alphabetical order.)	Date of ceremony (Note: Date is linked to the article about the awards held that year, wherever possible.)	Category	Recipient(s)	Result	Ref.
Filmfare Awards South	3 August 2024	Best Actor – Telugu	Prakash Raj	Nominated	
Filmfare Awards South	3 August 2024	Best Supporting Actor – Telugu	Brahmanandam	Won	
Filmfare Awards South	3 August 2024	Critics Award for Best Actor – Telugu	Prakash Raj	Won	
Filmfare Awards South	3 August 2024	Best Supporting Actress – Telugu	Ramya Krishnan	Nominated	
South Indian International Movie Awards	14 September 2024	Best Supporting Actor – Telugu	Brahmanandam	Nominated	
IIFA Utsavam	7 September 2024	Best Supporting Actor – Telugu	Brahmanandam	Won	
