= Balagam (film) =

2023 Indian film by Venu Yeldandi

- Theatrical release poster
- Directed by: Venu Yeldandi
- Written by: Venu Yeldandi; Ramesh Eligeti; Nagaraju Maduri
- Produced by: Harshith Reddy; Hanshitha Reddy
- Starring: Priyadarshi; Kavya Kalyanram; Sudhakar Reddy; Kota Jayaram; Muralidhar Goud; Rupa Lakshmi; Mime Madhu
- Cinematography: Acharya Venu
- Edited by: Madhu
- Music by: Bheems Ceciroleo
- Production company: Dil Raju Productions
- Release date: 3 March 2023
- Running time: 129 minutes
- Country: India
- Language: Telugu

Balagam (transl. Kith and Kin) is a 2023 Indian Telugu-language family drama film written and directed by actor Venu Yeldandi, in his directorial debut. It was produced by Hanshitha Reddy and Harshith Reddy, respectively, under Dil Raju Productions.

The film features Priyadarshi, Kavya Kalyanram, Sudhakar Reddy, Kota Jayaram, Muralidhar Goud and Rupa Lakshmi in primary roles. Balagam was released on 3 March 2023 to critical acclaim with particular praise for Yeldandi's direction, soundtrack, emotional weight of the story, screenplay and acting performances by the lead cast.

Balagam received various awards and nominations. The film is considered to be one of the best slice of life films of the year by various international juries. The film fetched the state Telangana Gaddar Film Award for Best Feature Film.

== Plot ==
Gajula Komurayya, a typical elderly inhabitant of a village in Telangana, sustains an apparently peaceful life with his elder son Ailayya, the latter's wife Swaroopa and their son Sayilu. Unbeknownst to his short-tempered father, Sayilu owes a massive sum of money to a cruel moneylender, whom he reassures that he will pay off the loan once he receives dowry from his fiancée's family. Nevertheless, Komurayya's untimely death prompts Sayilu's forthcoming marriage to be adjourned indefinitely and also, brings about the return of his estranged daughter Lakshmi, whose husband Narayana and Ailayya have been inhospitable to each other from past twenty years. As their rivalry persists, Komurayya is traditionally cremated and Narayana is desperate to leave; Komurayya's brother, however, urges him to extend his stay by eleven days. Komurayya's sister considers Sayilu's fiancée inappropriate for the family, holding Sayilu's betrothal to her responsible for Komurayya's death. This accusation leads to a conflict and ultimately, the wedding is called off.

Sayilu discerns Narayana to be a wealthy industrialist and realizes that marrying his only heiress Sandhya would bring him a huge fortune; Sandhya being his cross cousin makes his intentions legitimate. His efforts to court Sandhya are perpetually rebuffed; on the third day after Komurayya's cremation, a crow is supposed to be feeding on a feast offered by the family to Komurayya's soul and if doesn't, the soul is believed to be dissatisfied. As the crow doesn't devour, Narayana humiliates Ailayya for his failure and challenges to content the soul on the fifth day. He too remains unsuccessful, prompting Ailayya to mock and provoke him leading to a physical altercation; Narayana angrily storms out of the village with Lakshmi and Sandhya, disappointing Sayilu. Parallelly, Narsi is a tailor who had flippantly wished for Komurayya to die; as soon as he discovered that he really died, Narsi began to hold himself responsible for it and develops fever out of guilt. At the same time, two other villagers fall sick; the indirect cause of it is Komurayya's death. Intending to bring Lakshmi's family back, Sayilu takes advantage of this situation.

He and his friend purposefully argue publicly; the latter pretends to blame the restlessness of Komurayya's soul for mishaps in the village. Considering the reason adequate, Sarpanch of the village summons Komurayya's family to the Panchayat. He commands them to please Komurayya's soul by the eleventh day and if not, they will have to claim responsibility and accept banishment. Consequently, Lakshmi's family returns and Sandhya appreciates Sayilu's contribution to reuniting the families, displaying reciprocation. Ailayya recounts his affection for Lakshmi as Komurayya's sister narrates a story pertaining to their childhood, prompting a change in his conduct. Komurayya's brother imparts to everyone that Komurayya had had an inclination for Sayilu and Sandhya's marriage and believes that Narayana and Ailayya agreeing to do so might please his soul; as Narayana consents to his advice, Ailayya repents his misbehavior and apparently reconciles with him. Elsewhere, Mogilayya and his wife Sujata intend to sell a plot of their land to the latter's brother but the latter contemplates it ominous to buy a land with gravestone as Ailayya hopes to construct one for Komurayya in his favorite place: one that is included in Mogilayya's plot of land. As they fight over it, Komurayya's brother berates their disunity and selfish conduct; he laments over the despicable fact that his brother, who lived a long life, is being denied a land measuring just 3 ft for his gravestone. That night, Belgium presents his own selfish intentions, realizes that he won't get to see his grandfather again and profusely mourns his death.

Singers (or) Village mourners praise the departed soul, highlighting the individual's greatness and calls out each family member on Komurayya's behalf, requesting them to be united and happy on the eleventh day as they wait for the crow to accept the feast. Listening to the song, the extended family has an emotional epiphany, each realizing their misdeeds, understanding each other and tearfully reuniting through hugs and apologies. Sayilu brings a family portrait clicked before Ailayya and Narayana parted ways, which Komurayya often cried over. Ultimately, the crow accepts the feast, implying that Komurayya's soul consistently yearned for their reunion.

== Cast ==
- Priyadarshi as Gajula Saayilu, Ailayya's son and Komurayya's grandson
- Kavya Kalyanram as Sandhya, Lakshmi's daughter and Komurayya's granddaughter
- Sudhakar Reddy as Gajula Komurayya
- Kota Jayaram as Gajula Ailayya, Komurayya's elder son and Sayilu's father
- Kommu Sujatha as Gajula Swaroopa, Komurayya's elder daughter-in-law and Sayilu's mother
- Muralidhar Goud as Narayana, Komurayya's son-in-law and Sandhya's father
- Rupa Lakshmi as Lakshmi, Komurayya's daughter and Sandhya's mother
- Mime Madhu as Gajula Mogilayya, Komurayya's younger son
- Venu Yeldandi as Narsi, the tailor
- Krishna Teja as RMP Ravi, Sayilu's friend
- Racha Ravi as Rajesh, Sayilu's friend
- Rohini as Susheela, Narsi's wife
- Vidyasagar Karampuri as the villager

== Soundtrack ==
The soundtrack album is composed by Bheems Ceciroleo, with lyrics written by Kasarla Shyam. Background score Composed by Suresh Bobbili, Bobbilis BGM and Climax song played a major role in the successes of Balagam, Aditya Music released the complete soundtrack album featuring three tracks.

The first song of the film "Ooru Palletooru" was released on 6 February 2023.

All lyrics are written by Kasarla Shyam.

Track listing
No.	Title	Singer(s)	Length
1.	"Balarama Narasayoo"	Bheems Ceciroleo, Venu Yeldandi	4:40
2.	"Potti Pilla"	Ram Miriyala	3:44
3.	"Ooru Palletooru"	Ram Miriyala, Mangli	4:80
4.	"Thoduga ma thodundi"	Mogili, Komaramma	5:28
5.	"Ayyo Shivuda"	Kondappa Dasari	1:10
6.	"Kodukulara"	Venu Yeldandi	2:41

== Release ==
Balagam was released on 3 March 2023 with both critical and commercial acclaim. Even after the film premiered on Amazon Prime Video and Simply South (outside India) on 24 March 2023 people those who watched the film in OTT started going to theatres to experience the film on big screen.

== Reception ==
=== Critical reception ===
Raghu Bandi of The Indian Express also gave the same rating and stated: "Balagam is an honest slice of life story from rural Telangana". A critic writing for The Times of India, mentioned that the films's creative and technical team needs a special mention, while praising the screenplay and acting performance of Priyadarshi and Kavya Kalyanram.

== Accolades ==
Priyadarshi and Kethiri Sudhakar Reddy, won the Best Actor and Best Supporting Actors respectively at the Swedish International Film Festival, 2023. At the Los Angeles Cinematography Awards 2023, Balagam won Best Feature Film, and Best Feature Film - Cinematography honors. At the Golden Bridge İstanbul Short Film Festival 2023 it won awards for Best Feature Film, Best Director, and Best Lead Actor. At Denver Monthly Film Critics Awards it won March Award for Best Feature, and Nominated for Best Actor.

Award (Note: Awards, festivals and organizations are in alphabetical order.)	Date of ceremony (Note: Date is linked to the article about the awards held that year, wherever possible.)	Category	Recipient(s)	Result	Ref.
Gaddar Awards	30 May 2025	Best Feature Film (Gold)	Hanshitha Reddy and Harshith Reddy	Won	
Filmfare Awards South	3 August 2024	Best Film – Telugu	Hanshitha Reddy and Harshith Reddy	Won	
Filmfare Awards South	3 August 2024	Best Director – Telugu	Venu Yeldandi	Won	
Filmfare Awards South	3 August 2024	Best Supporting Actor – Telugu	Kota Jayaram	Nominated	
Filmfare Awards South	3 August 2024	Best Supporting Actress – Telugu	Rupa Lakshmi	Won	
Filmfare Awards South	3 August 2024	Best Music Director – Telugu	Bheems Ceciroleo	Nominated	
Filmfare Awards South	3 August 2024	Best Lyricist – Telugu	Kasarla Shyam ("Ooru Palletooru")	Nominated	
Filmfare Awards South	3 August 2024	Best Male Playback Singer – Telugu	Ram Miriyala ("Potti Pilla")	Nominated	
Filmfare Awards South	3 August 2024	Best Female Playback Singer – Telugu	Mangli ("Ooru Palletooru")	Nominated	
IIFA Utsavam	27 September 2024	Best Male Performance in a Supporting Role – Telugu	Racha Ravi	Nominated	
IIFA Utsavam	27 September 2024	Best Female Playback Singer – Telugu	Mangli ("Ooru Palletooru")	Won	
Santosham Film Awards	2 December 2023	Best Film	Venu Yeldandi	Won	
South Indian International Movie Awards	14 September 2024	Best Film – Telugu	Sudhakar Cherukuri	Nominated	
South Indian International Movie Awards	14 September 2024	Best Comedian – Telugu	Racha Ravi	Nominated	
South Indian International Movie Awards	14 September 2024	Best Debut Director – Telugu	Venu Yeldandi	Nominated	
South Indian International Movie Awards	14 September 2024	Best Lyricist – Telugu	Kasarla Shyam ("Ooru Palletooru")	Nominated	
South Indian International Movie Awards	14 September 2024	Best Male Playback Singer – Telugu	Ram Miriyala ("Ooru Palletooru")	Won	
