= Kasturi (2023 TV series) =

2023 Indian Marathi-language TV series

- Genre: Drama; Soap opera
- Starring: See below
- Country of origin: India
- Original language: Marathi
- No. of episodes: 102

Production
- Camera setup: Multi-camera
- Running time: 22 minutes

Original release
- Network: Colors Marathi
- Release: 26 June – 13 October 2023

Related
- Kendasampige

Kasturi is an Indian Marathi language television series which premiered from 26 June 2023 aired on Colors Marathi. It stars Ashok Phaldesai, Ekta Labde and Dushyant Wagh. It is an official remake of Kannada series Kendasampige.

== Plot ==
Kasturi and Nilesh are siblings whose bond is stronger than anything. The latter joins politics along with a local hero - Samar - but unfortunately, dies in a rally. Kasturi now decides to complete what he started but a revelation of his death tears her apart.

== Cast ==
=== Main ===
- Ashok Phaldesai as Samar Kuber
- Ekta Labde as Kasturi
- Dushyant Wagh as Nilesh

=== Recurring ===
- Pratiksha Jadhav as Urmila Kuber
- Vidya Karanjikar
- Jaywant Wadkar
- Madhavi Juvekar
- Swapnil Ajgaonkar
- Sanika Banaraswale

== Adaptations ==
Language	Title	Original release	Network(s)	Last aired	Notes
Kannada	Kendasampige ಕೆಂಡಸಂಪಿಗೆ	22 August 2022	Colors Kannada	27 September 2024	Original
Marathi	Kasturi कस्तुरी	26 June 2023	Colors Marathi	13 October 2023	Remake
Hindi	Suman Indori सुमन इंदौरी	3 September 2024	Colors TV	27 April 2025	Remake
