= Kaathal: The Core =

2023 Indian film by Jeo Baby

- Theatrical release poster
- Directed by: Jeo Baby
- Written by: Adarsh Sukumaran; Paulson Skaria
- Produced by: Mammootty
- Starring: Mammootty; Jyothika
- Cinematography: Salu K. Thomas; Viggu
- Edited by: Francies Louis
- Music by: Mathews Pulickan
- Production company: Mammootty Kampany
- Distributed by: Wayfarer Films
- Release date: 23 November 2023
- Running time: 114 minutes
- Country: India
- Language: Malayalam
- Box office: est. ₹14.5 crore

Kaathal: The Core (Note: According to Jeo Baby and Mammootty, Kaathal has the dual meaning of "core" in Malayalam and "love" in Tamil.) is a 2023 Indian Malayalam-language courtroom drama film directed by Jeo Baby and written by Adarsh Sukumaran and Paulson Skaria. Produced by Mammootty Kampany, the film stars Mammootty and Jyothika in lead roles. Sudhi Kozhikode, RS Panickar, Joji John, Muthumani, Chinnu Chandni and Kalabhavan Haneef played the other supporting roles.

The film was officially announced in October 2022 and principal photography commenced in the same month and wrapped up in November 2022. The music was composed by Mathews Pulickan. The editing was handled by Francies Louis and the cinematography by Salu K. Thomas.

Kaathal: The Core was released on 23 November 2023 and opened to positive reviews from critics praising the performances of Jyothika and Mammootty. A commercial success at the box office, this was the final film appearance of Kalabhavan Haneef.

== Plot ==
Mathew Devassy, a retired bank manager, lives with his family of four - his wife, Omana, daughter, Femy, and father, Devassy, leading a respectable life in his village. Thanks to his father's contribution towards the CR Party, Mathew is given a chance to contest the Local Village Body elections. One evening, he discovers that Omana has filed a divorce petition against him alleging that he is homosexual. Upon confronting that it might hinder his election candidature, Omana says that she had filed it two months ago. They approach for a speedy trial in the Family Court, where Omana had filed the petition alleging that he has not fulfilled her marital obligations, but was perfect in raising a family. The respondent lawyer asks her the number of times they had intercourse, to which she replies four - in their entire twenty years of marital life.

Upon questioning the need for a divorce then, the representing lawyer argues that Mathew would have been accused of committing a crime if she had filed the petition earlier according to the then existing law (IPC 377). Mathew denies his homosexuality and relationship with Thankan, his alleged partner accused in the case, during the cross-checking by the prosecution. Thankan, who owns a driving school, expresses anguish that his sexual orientation is different and that his school is flooded by only women. His nephew, Kuttayi, breaks down facing harassment and bullying in school. Meanwhile, the party is puzzled about Mathew's election campaigning.

As the case proceeds, Devassy is called upon as a direct witness and accepts that his son has been a homosexual since his childhood and the marriage was pressurized by him due to the expectations of the society. That night, Devassy bursts into tears and agrees that he was responsible for the mishappenings of his son's life. Mathew apologises to Omana and implores that he was afraid to come out. Omana says that she wanted a divorce to rescue them both from this meaningless family life; they both shed tears. The next day, as they sign the divorce papers, Mathew comes out as a gay man and proceeds to campaign for the elections.

Post the elections, the victorious Mathew is seeking a potential groom for Omana, with Thankan as his partner.

== Cast ==
- Mammootty as Mathew Devassy - a retired bank manager
- Jyothika as Omana Philip Mathew - Mathew's wife
- Sudhi Kozhikode as Thankan, Mathew's friend
- Pooja Mohanraj as Thankan's sister
- Anagha Maya Ravi as Femy Mathew, Mathew's and Omana's daughter
- RS Panickar as Devassy, Mathew's father
- Joji John as Tomy, Mathew's brother-in-law
- Muthumani as Adv. Ameera
- Chinnu Chandni as Adv. Sajitha
- Alex Alister as Kuttayi
- Kalabhavan Haneef as Judge
- Josey Sijo as Sibin Teekoy
- Jeo Baby as Kuttayi's stepfather

== Production ==
=== Development ===
In August 2022, Jeo Baby was rumoured to direct a film starring Mammootty and Jyothika in lead roles. However, he denied it as a rumour. In late-September, Baby confirmed that he would be directing Mammootty in a film produced by Mammootty Kampany, for which the pre-production works had already begun. Jyothika was yet to sign the film as the casting process was underway. On 18 October, the title of the film was announced and Jyothika's inclusion was confirmed, thereby marking her return to Malayalam cinema after a hiatus of 12 years, since Seetha Kalyanam (2009). Jeo said that it was the first time that he was working on a script that was not his own. But when he heard the story, he liked it and then approached Mammotty to play the lead role. While considering options for a leading lady to play the role of the wife, Mammootty suggested casting Jyothika. The writing team included Adarsh Sukumaran and Paulson Skaria. Jeo retained most of his technicians from his film The Great Indian Kitchen (2021) including cinematographer Salu K. Thomas, editor Francies Louis and music composer Mathews Pulickan.

=== Filming ===
Principal photography began on 20 October 2022 in Kochi with a customary pooja ceremony. Jyothika joined the sets on 27 October. Mammootty completed filming for his portions on 18 November while Jyothika's was completed on 20 November. Filming was wrapped up on 22 November 2022, in a span of 34 days.

=== Post-production ===
Post-production works began in late-January 2023. In March 2023, K. S. Chithra recorded a song composed by Mathews Pulickan.

== Release ==
=== Theatrical ===
The film was released theatrically on 23 November 2023.

=== Home Media ===
The digital rights of the film is acquired by Amazon Prime Video and released on 5 January 2024 in Malayalam, Hindi, Tamil, Telugu and Kannada languages. After its streaming rights on Amazon Prime Video got expired, the film was acquired by ZEE5 and started streaming from 14 April 2026.

== Reception ==
The film was praised by some members of the LGBT community for its portrayal of the gay character, but people from anti-LGBT groups commented negatively on Mammootty's social media pages criticising the actor for his role and asking for a boycott of the film. Muslim clerics and Christian priests also criticized the film's representation of homosexuality, suggesting that it would "brainwash the youth".

=== Critical response ===
On the review aggregator website Rotten Tomatoes, 100% of 8 critics' reviews are positive, with an average rating of 8/10. Kathal - The Core received mostly positive reviews from critics.

Anandu Suresh of The Indian Express gave 4 out of 5 stars and wrote, "Kaathal – The Core is a groundbreaking film that should be watched by all, particularly those in the film industry who continue to present recycled age-old narratives, expecting unquestioning acceptance from the audiences." Janani K. of India Today gave 4 out of 5 stars and wrote, "'Kaathal - The Core' is not just about the coming out, it's also about how these characters move on in life after the divorce. The last shot is dedicated to all the LGBTQIA+ members." Sajin Shrijith of Cinema Express gave 4 out of 5 stars and wrote, "Kaathal is arguably the most daring attempt from Malayalam cinema so far, mainly owing to one of its biggest superstars spearheading a film that asks some much-needed questions about a complex topic that doesn't have to be so."

Anna Mathews of The Times of India gave 3.5 out of 5 stars and wrote, "Good movies can make society think and even initiate change. Kaathal - The Core might be one such." Sukanya Shaji of The News Minute gave 3.5 out of 5 stars and wrote, "The heart of Kaathal - The Core is, undoubtedly, the relationship between Mammootty's Mathew Devassy and Jyothika's Omana, and the heartbreaking dignity with which they help each other out of their predicaments." Manoj Kumar R. of OTTPlay gave 4 out of 5 stars and wrote, "Kaathal – The Core navigates through a myriad of sensitive subjects and personal choices deeply influenced by the age-old societal concern of "What will people say?"."

S. R. Praveen of The Hindu wrote, "'Kaathal' beautifully uses a conventional family drama setting to tackle a subject that is still largely a taboo in the industry and the larger society; it is quite a triumph in that sense." Princy Alexander of Onmanorama wrote, "Just like Nivin Pauly and Geethu Mohandas's Moothon, 'Kaathal The Core' will be remembered for its unconventional theme and for lending Mammootty one more praise-worthy character in his illustrious career." Sarath Ramesh Kuniyl of The Week gave 4.5 out of 5 stars and wrote, "Kaathal – The Core is a watershed moment in Malayalam cinema, much like The Great Indian Kitchen. Both Baby and Mammootty have shattered a glass ceiling, the sound of which, one hopes, will reverberate loudly in the society and for long."

Nikhil Sebastian of Pinkvilla gave 4 out of 5 stars and wrote, "Kaathal stands as another masterpiece from Jeo Baby and Mammootty. With a compelling plot and a poignant subject, the movie succeeds in establishing a strong emotional connection with the audience throughout its two-hour runtime." Harshini S. V. of Film Companion wrote, "Kaathal – The Core speaks about the struggles of coming out and addresses the need for acceptance in a conventional society. And if that's not bold and progressive, I am not sure what is." Priyanka Sundar of Firstpost gave 4 out of 5 stars and wrote, "Joe Baby, the director who also gave us the Great Indian Kitchen masterfully depicts the life of Omana and Mathew so sensibly and with a sensitive approach. It is rare to see a film so well made when it centers on a relationship — especially one that is forced to stick with heteronormativity."

Analysing the movie, Sajesh Mohan of Onmanorama wrote "In Kaathal - The Core, Jeo Baby's writers Adarsh Sukumaran and Paulson Skaria occasionally resort to the FAQ format to elucidate the necessity of proper understanding and acceptance of sexual orientation. However, it's not these preaching sessions that drive the point home; it's the characters." Sujatha Narayanan of The Quint wrote "Kaathal – The Core is a sensitive, dignified, and nuanced film that brings to fore the importance of how big stars like Mammootty and Jyotika (who returned to the big screen after three years) fit into humble places with much grace. With Kaathal, Mammootty also squashes pre written stereotypes for how a hero should be on screen, what kind of roles a megastar can take up, and whether an actor with a good market should do an experimental, bold film at all. Kaathal makes us all want to be better human beings – and that's the most important achievement of Jeo Baby's film."

=== Box office ===
Kathal - The Core recorded an opening of ₹1.05 crore. The film recorded a 19% jump in revenue on its second day in theatres by earning ₹1.25 crore. On its first weekend, the film grossed ₹1.6 crores on Saturday with a 42.04% occupancy rate and grossed ₹1.75 crores on Sunday. Kathal - The Core grossed a total of Rs 5 crore within four days of its release. The film reportedly collected ₹16.25 lakhs from Aries Plex Theatre, Thiruvananthapuram. By its first weekend the film grossed ₹1 crore from ROI circuits. The next day, the film grossed around 6.25 crore. By its 8th day it grossed around ₹7.95 crores. On its 12th day the film grossed ₹13.15 crores and was declared a theatrical hit.

== Awards and honours ==
Kerala State Film Awards

- Best Film - Jeo Baby & Mammootty
- Best Story - Adarsh Sukumaran & Paulson Skaria
- Best Music Director – Score - Mathews Pulickan
- Special Mention - Sudhi Kozhikode

69th Filmfare Awards South

- Filmfare Critics Award for Best Malayalam Film - Jeo Baby
- Best Actress (Critics) – Malayalam - Jyothika
- Best Lyricist – Malayalam - Anwar Ali ("Ennum En Kaaval")

Vanitha Film Awards

- Best Director - Jeo Baby
- Best Actor - Mammootty
- Best Actress - Jyothika

Other Awards, recognition & nominations

- It was featured at the 54th IFFI Indian panorama section.
- Officially selected at Imagine India Film Festival in Madrid
- Nominated for Melbourne International Film Festival for Best Actor for Mammootty & Best Actress for Jyothika
- Won South Indian International Movie Awards for Best Actress - Critics - Jyothika
- Won IIFA Utsavam for Best Actress - Critics - Jyothika
- Nominated for best actor & actress category at Koimoi Awards and National Critics Choice Awards.
