= Kendasampige (TV series) =

2022 Kannada-language television drama

- Genre: Drama
- Written by: Girija Manjunath (Dialogues)
- Story by: Kumareshan
- Directed by: R. Subash Arva
- Starring: Madhumitha, Kavyashiva; Akash
- Composers: Pramod Maravanthe; Vasuki Vaibhav; Vijeth Manjayya
- Country of origin: India
- Original language: Kannada
- No. of episodes: 614

Production
- Producers: Tejasvini Bhaskar; Megha Shetty
- Camera setup: Multi-camera
- Running time: 22 minutes
- Production company: Parinitha Productions

Original release
- Network: Colors Kannada
- Release: 22 August 2022 – 27 September 2024

Kendasampige is an Indian Kannada language drama television series that premiered from 22 August 2022 on Colors Kannada. It stars Kavyashiva, Madhumitha and Akash in their lead roles. This show is produced by Megha Shetty under the banner of Parinitha Production.

== Plot ==
The heroine of the story, Sumana, is a girl with a very simple personality who belongs to a poor family. No matter how difficult her life is, she is always at the forefront of helping the people of her colony. She makes a living by selling flowers. On the other hand, the leader, corporator Thirthankara Prasad, needs to become an MLA. For that, the vote of the people of Sumana Colony is required. For this, he starts helping Sumana to gain the trust of the people there.

Sumana is very resentful of Rajesh. Rajesh and Sumana do not speak directly. Rajesh works near the theerth. One day he gets bent in the party struggle. He went there to perform a play and actually doused himself with petrol and died. To quell the anger of the colony people, the leader says that he will do a mass marriage. He decides to marry Sumana there. But, the man who will marry Sumana runs away. He marries Sumana himself to save his reputation and gain the trust of the colony. The story revolves around how Sumana lives in her husband's house after marriage, how she endures the disdain of her husband's family.

== Cast ==
- Madhumitha/Kavya Shaiva as Sumana-Teertha's wife; Rajesh's elder sister
- Akash as Thirthankar Prasad; Sumana's husband
- Raj Ninasam as Jairam; Thirthankar's elder brother
- Sunil as Rajesh
- Amrita Rammurthy as Sadhana; Thirthankar's sister-in-law
- Doddanna as Keshav Prasad- father of Thirthanakar
- Nisarga Manjunath as Janhavi- Teertha's sister
- Chaitra Rao Sachin as Katyayini - Keshav Prasad's sister

== Production ==
The show marks the first production venture of Megha Shetty. The show title is based on film Kendasampige.

== Adaptations ==
Language	Title	Original release	Network(s)	Last aired	Notes
Kannada	Kendasampige ಕೆಂಡಸಂಪಿಗೆ	22 August 2022	Colors Kannada	27 September 2024	Original
Marathi	Kasturi कस्तुरी	26 June 2023	Colors Marathi	13 October 2023	Remake
Hindi	Suman Indori सुमन इंदौरी	3 September 2024	Colors TV	27 April 2025	Remake
