= Ponniyin Selvan: II (soundtrack) =

2023 soundtrack album by A. R. Rahman

- Album cover

Soundtrack album by A. R. Rahman
- Released: 29 March 2023
- Recorded: 2019–2023
- Studios: Panchathan Record Inn and AM Studios, Chennai; Panchathan Hollywood Studios, Los Angeles; Abbey Road Studios, London
- Genre: Feature film soundtrack
- Language: Tamil
- Label: Tips Music
- Producer: A. R. Rahman

A. R. Rahman chronology
Pathu Thala (2023)	Ponniyin Selvan: II (2023)	Maamannan (2023)

Singles from Ponniyin Selvan: II
- 1. "Aga Naga" Released: 20 March 2023

Ponniyin Selvan: II is the soundtrack album for 2023 Indian Tamil-language epic period drama film of the same name directed by Mani Ratnam which features an ensemble cast of Vikram, Karthi, Jayam Ravi, Aishwarya Rai Bachchan, Trisha, Aishwarya Lekshmi. The film’s soundtrack and score were composed by Ratnam's norm composer A. R. Rahman.

Ponniyin Selvan: II featured seven songs, most of them were written by Ilango Krishnan. It includes Sangam-literature poet Kudavayil Keerathanar's excerpts whereas "Aazhi Mazhai Kanna" was inspired from Andal's Thiruppavai and "Shivoham" from Adi Shankara's Atma Shatakam. Gulzar, Ananta Sriram, Chandrabose, Ramajogayya Sastry, Rafeeq Ahamed and Jayanth Kaikini are credited as the songwriters for the Hindi, Telugu, Malayalam and Kannada versions, respectively. The first single "Aga Naga" was released by Tips Music on 20 March 2023. The album was launched on 29 March, at an event held in Jawaharlal Nehru Indoor Stadium in Chennai, with the presence of the cast and crew and other celebrities. The music received positive response from critics and audience.

== Background ==
Rahman had extensively researched on the music of Ponniyin Selvan: I and II as the story was set in the Chola period. The soundtrack for the duology has thirteen songs, for which Rahman had worked for nearly three years since mid-2019 to early-2023 at the Panchathan Record Inn and AM Studios in Chennai. In March 2023, A. R. Rahman started recording the background score for the second part of the film at the Abbey Road Studios in London with orchestration done by Matt Dunkley. Ilango Krishnan was hired as the songwriter for the films, replacing their norm collaborator Vairamuthu, due to allegations of sexual misconduct. He further read several novels about Cholas' history from prominent Indian historians-authors as well as classical poems to illustrate aesthetics of Classical and Sangam Tamil poetry and incorporated modernised Tamil to "bring to life the imagery of the Chola period". He used various styles of Tamil in the songs which includes Kappiya, kaviya, bakthi and Manipravalam.

"Aga Naga" was used as an excerpt in the first film, which was expanded for the second film. Composed in maand raga, Shakthishree Gopalan recorded the excerpt of the song in all languages after the COVID-19 lockdown in 2020, which was used in the scene where Vanthiyathevan meets Kundhavai. Ilango Krishnan was asked by Rahman to use "smaller words" and he penned lyrics describing about the princess' love with her land and a warrior in equal measure. He said that "Mani Ratnam’s brief to me was to incorporate the princess’s feeling of possession over her people, her land, its mountains, trees, and flowers, as well as her attraction to Vanthiyathevan. But theirs is a love that cannot be openly declared. She is in a high position, whereas he is a war commander" "Aga Naga" was meant as "outwardly smile" describing that "she looks at a tree full of flowers that appears to be smiling, and likens it to herself and what she is feeling inside". It was written in Antati, where the last word in a verse forms the first word of the next.

"Veera Raja Veera" had been adapted from a 1978 dhrupad composition, "Shiva Shiva", by the Junior Dagar Brothers in raga Adana. In May 2023, Wasifuddin Dagar accused Rahman of plagiarism with commercial intent - the film production team claimed "Mr. Dagar’s allegations are unfounded and not true." However, attribution was later added to the official YouTube song video. Members of Rahman's team had been students of the Dagar vani.

"Veera Raja Veera" was recorded in December 2019 with Harini, Shankar Mahadevan and K. S. Chithra. Rahman called Chithra to record the song, though she had common cold as "he wanted to sound different". Chitra felt that the song "was long and it took almost six hours to complete it as it had many layers". A promo video featuring A. R. Rahman, Chinmayi, Shakthisree Gopalan, and Shweta Mohan was launched on March 26, 2023, to announce the trailer and audio launch of the film.

== Release ==
The album had seven tracks for the film, and was led by the first single "Aga Naga" on 20 March 2023. The soundtrack was launched on 29 March 2023 at the Jawaharlal Nehru Indoor Stadium in Chennai, with the film's cast and crew attending the event and was preceded by Kamal Haasan as the chief guest. A promotional single "PS Anthem" was released on 15 April 2023 at the Anna University in Chennai. Rahman sang the Tamil version of the anthem with Moroccan singer Nabyla Maan, whereas Arijit Singh performed the song in Hindi along with Benny Dayal.

== Track listing ==
Tamil
No.	Title	Lyrics	Singer(s)	Length
1.	"Aga Naga"	Ilango Krishnan	Shakthisree Gopalan	4:07
2.	"Veera Raja Veera"	Siva Ananth	Shankar Mahadevan, K. S. Chithra, Harini	5:21
3.	"Shivoham"	Adi Shankara	Sathyaprakash, Dr. Narayanan, Sreekanth Hariharan, Nivas, Aravind Srinivas, Shenbagaraj, T S Ayyappan	1:27
4.	"Chinnanjiru Nilave"	Ilango Krishnan	Haricharan	3:34
5.	"Aazhi Mazhai Kanna"	Andal	Harini	1:20
6.	"Ilaiyor Soodaar"	Kudavayil Keerathanar	Keerthana Vaidyanathan, Niranjana Ramanan, Vaish	1:54
7.	"Chinnanjiru (Marumurai)"	Ilango Krishnan	Khatija Rahman	2:47
Total length:				20:14

Extended Tracklist
No.	Title	Lyrics	Singer(s)	Length
1.	"PS Anthem"	Siva Ananth	A. R. Rahman, Nabyla Maan	3:05
Total length:				3:05

Telugu
No.	Title	Lyrics	Singer(s)	Length
1.	"Aaganandhe"	Anantha Sriram	Shakthisree Gopalan	4:07
2.	"Veera Raja Veera"	Chandrabose	Shankar Mahadevan, Chinmayi	5:21
3.	"Shivoham"	Adi Shankara	Sathyaprakash, Dr. Narayanan, Sreekanth Hariharan, Nivas, Aravind Srinivas, Shenbagaraj, T S Ayyappan	1:27
4.	"Minnanchula Vennelaa"	Ramajogayya Sastry	Haricharan	3:34
5.	"Prarthanalu Vinumaa"	Chandrabose	Sireesha Bhagavatula	1:20
6.	"Alupae Ledhe"	Chandrabose	Sireesha Bhagavatula, Haripriya, Deepthi Suresh	1:54
7.	"Minnanchula Vennelaa (Reprise)"	Ramajogayya Sastry	Khatija Rahman	2:47
Total length:				20:14

Extended Tracklist
No.	Title	Lyrics	Singer(s)	Length
1.	"PS Anthem"	Chandrabose	Hariharan, Benny Dayal, Nabyla Maan	3:05
Total length:				3:05

Hindi
No.	Title	Lyrics	Singer(s)	Length
1.	"Ruaa Ruaa"	Gulzar	Shilpa Rao	4:07
2.	"Veera Raja Veera"	Gulzar	Kavita Krishnamurti, Shreya Ghoshal, Arman Dehlvi, Shivam Bhardwaj	5:21
3.	"Shivoham"	Adi Shankara	Sathyaprakash, Dr. Narayanan, Sreekanth Hariharan, Nivas, Aravind Srinivas, Shenbagaraj, T S Ayyappan	1:27
4.	"Mera Aasmaan Jal Gaya"	Gulzar	Arijit Singh	3:34
5.	"Megha Re Megha"	Gulzar	Jonita Gandhi, Antara Nandy	1:20
6.	"Mukti Do"	Gulzar	Pooja Tiwari, Dilshaad Shabbir Shaikh	1:54
7.	"Mera Aasmaan Jal Gaya (Reprise)"	Gulzar	Khatija Rahman	2:47
Total length:				20:14

Extended Tracklist
No.	Title	Lyrics	Singer(s)	Length
1.	"PS Anthem"	Gulzar	Arijit Singh, Benny Dayal, Nabyla Maan	3:05
Total length:				3:05

Malayalam
No.	Title	Lyrics	Singer(s)	Length
1.	"Akamalar"	Rafeeq Ahmed	Shakthisree Gopalan	4:07
2.	"Veera Raja Veera"	Rafeeq Ahmed	Srinivas, Shweta Mohan	5:21
3.	"Shivoham"	Adi Shankara	Sathyaprakash, Dr. Narayanan, Sreekanth Hariharan, Nivas, Aravind Srinivas, Shenbagaraj, T S Ayyappan	1:27
4.	"Chellacheru Nilave"	Rafeeq Ahmed	Vijay Yesudas	3:34
5.	"Thazhe Mazha Deva"	Rafeeq Ahmed	Shweta Mohan	1:20
6.	"Ilaiyoor Choodaa"	Rafeeq Ahmed	Kalyani Nair, Sharanya Srinivas, Uthara Unnikrishnan	1:54
7.	"Chellacheru Nilave (Reprise)"	Rafeeq Ahmed	Varsha S. Krishnan	2:47
Total length:				20:14

Extended Tracklist
No.	Title	Lyrics	Singer(s)	Length
1.	"PS Anthem"	Rafeeq Ahmed	Benny Dayal, Nabyla Maan	3:05
Total length:				3:05

Kannada
No.	Title	Lyrics	Singer(s)	Length
1.	"Kirunage"	Jayanth Kaikini	Rakshita Suresh	4:07
2.	"Veera Raja Veera"	Jayanth Kaikini	Vijay Prakash, Rakshita Suresh, Sivasri Skandaprasad	5:21
3.	"Shivoham"	Adi Shankara	Sathyaprakash, Dr. Narayanan, Sreekanth Hariharan, Nivas, Aravind Srinivas, Shenbagaraj, T S Ayyappan	1:27
4.	"Rekheyinda Elheda"	Jayanth Kaikini	Nakul Abhyankar	3:34
5.	"Baaro Malhe Deva"	Jayanth Kaikini	Sivasri Skandaprasad	1:20
6.	"Maaya"	Jayanth Kaikini	Vasudha Ravi, Deepthi Suresh, Vinaya Karthik Rajan	1:54
7.	"Rekheyinda Elheda (Reprise)"	Jayanth Kaikini	Ramya Bhat Abhyankar	2:47
Total length:				20:14

Extended Tracklist
No.	Title	Lyrics	Singer(s)	Length
1.	"PS Anthem"	Jayanth Kaikini	Armaan Malik, Nakul Abhyankar, Nabyla Maan	3:05
Total length:				3:05

== Reception ==
Vipin Nair of Music Aloud gave 4/5 to the album, saying "A spectacular soundtrack from A R Rahman and Ilango Krishnan, whose only problem is its length. While the first part had a terrific set of songs as well, the sound was a bit more “commercial”. This one however has the composer fully embracing that period sound and producing a classically rich set of songs." Critic Jayabhuvaneshwari B of Cinema Express had praised the quality of the music in the second part, to that of the first one, commenting "the mix of Hindustani and Carnatic roots add to the quality of every song in the album".
