= Anjana Jayaprakash =

Indian actress

- Born: Dubai, United Arab Emirates
- Education: Kumaraguru College of Technology, Coimbatore; B.Tech Fashion Designing
- Occupations: Actress; film producer; model
- Years active: 2016–present

Anjana Jayaprakash is an Indian actress who has appeared in Malayalam and Tamil language films. She had acted in several short films in lead roles before making her debut in the Tamil film Dhuruvangal Pathinaaru (2016) in one of the pivotal roles.

== Career ==
Anjana was born in Dubai, United Arab Emirates. She completed her school education there and moved to Coimbatore, India, to pursue her engineering degree in B.Tech. Fashion Technology at Kumaraguru College of Technology, Coimbatore. In college, she was senior to Director Karthick Naren, who later directed Dhuruvangal Pathinaaru. During college, she started modeling for college fashion shows and designer events. She also started acting in short films made in her college. One notable short film was Muse, directed by her college junior Kannan RK. She portrayed the role of Mythili, a sex worker who aspires to become an actress and eventually ends up being a best-selling author of a novel. This short film fetched awards in many film festivals around the country. The short film was shortlisted for the National Film Award for Best Short Fiction Film. After all these accolades, she finally decided to pursue acting as a full-time profession.

She got various offers in modeling and started appearing in many television advertisements. She acted in a music video, Sun Le Zara, and also took the helm of directing a music video, Rimjhim Gire sawan, by the artist Simran Sehgal. She finally made her debut with the blockbuster film portraying Vaishnavi, one of the pivotal characters in the film.

== Filmography ==
=== Films ===
Year	Title	Role	Language	Notes
2016	Dhuruvangal Pathinaaru	Vaishnavi	Tamil	Debut film
2022	Achcham Madam Naanam Payirppu	Rathi	Tamil	
2023	Pachuvum Athbutha Vilakkum	Hamsadhwani	Malayalam	
2024	Turbo	Indhulekha S. Nair	Malayalam	

=== Webseries ===
Year	Title	Role	Language	Notes
2019	Queen	Vicenarian Shakthi Seshadri	Tamil	MX Player release
2019	Police Diary 2.0	Cop	Tamil	ZEE5 release

=== Music videos ===
Year	Title	Role	Language	Notes
2016	Sun Le Zara	Main lead	Hindi	
