= Nabyla Maan =

Moroccan singer-songwriter (born 1987)

Nabyla Maan نبيلة عبدلاوي معان
- Born: Nabyla Maan; 6 December 1987 (age 38); Fes, Morocco
- Genres: Andalusi, Gharnati, Classical Arabic music, pop
- Occupations: Singer, songwriter, record producer, music video director
- Instruments: Vocals, keyboard
- Years active: 2005–present
- Label: SNRT (2005–current)
- Website: www.nabylamaan.ma

Nabyla Maan (Arabic: نبيلة معن; born in Fez, Morocco) is a Moroccan singer and music producer.

== Biography ==
Nabyla Maan recorded her first album D'nya in 2005, in which she sings in Darija Arabic, Classical Arabic and French, including two versions of Nass El Ghiwane's famous songs "Allah Ya Molana" and "Essiniya". At age 19, she was the youngest Arab and African artist to perform at the Olympia music hall in Paris.

In 2009, she released her second album Ya Tayr El Ali, which also featured songs in Moroccan Arabic, Classical Arabic and French, including her version of Edith Piaf's "Padam Padam". Nabyla Maan is considered a world music artist with Arab as well as Western influences.

== Discography ==
=== Albums ===
- Lamma Bada
- D'nya (2005)
- Ter El Ali (2009)
- Aech hyatek (Vis ta vie) (2013)
- Dalalû Al-Andalûs (2017)
- Dos Medinas Blancas (2017)

=== Singles ===
- اختَر Khtar (2010)
- احكِ لِي Hki li (2011)
- عِشْ حياتك Vis ta vie (2013)
- "Ahin Ya Sultani" (2019)
