= Megha Shetty =

Indian Actress, producer

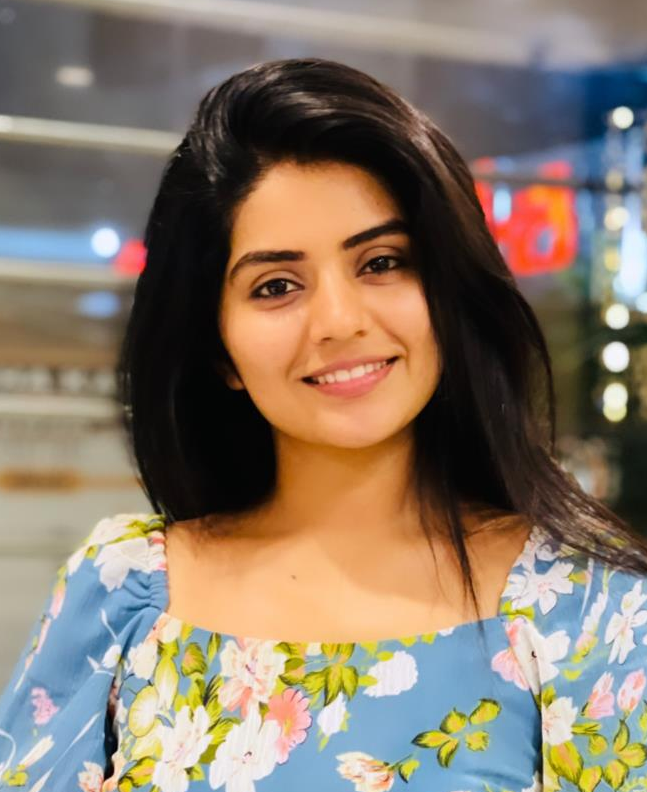
- Born: 1998 (age 27–28); Mangalore, Karnataka, India
- Education: Master of Business Administration
- Occupations: Actress; Producer
- Years active: 2019-present
- Television: Jothe Jotheyali

Megha Shetty (born 1998) is an Indian film and television actress who works predominantly in Kannada film industry. She started her career with the serial Jothe Jotheyali.

== Life and career ==
Megha was born in 1998 to a Tulu speaking Bunts family in Mangalore, Karnataka and she grew up in Bengaluru. She started her acting career with the serial Jothe Jotheyali. She made her debut in the Kannada movie Triple Riding. She also co-produced the serial Kendasampige aired on Colors Kannada.

== Filmography ==
- Note: all work is in Kannada, unless otherwise noted.

=== Films ===
Year	Title	Role	Notes	Ref.
2022	Triple Riding	Dr. Rakshitha		
2022	Dilpasand	Minchu		
2023	Kaiva	Salma		
2026	Operation London Cafe	Bhavya	Kannada-Marathi bilingual film	
2026	Graamaayana	Kusuma		
TBA	Cheetah	TBA		

=== Television ===
Year	Title	Role	Notes	Ref.
2019–2023	Jothe Jotheyali	Anu Sirimane	Debut Serial	
2022–2024	Kendasampige	—N/a	As co-producer	

== Awards and nominations ==
Year	Film	Award	Category	Result	Notes	Ref.
2020	Jothe Jotheyali	Zee Kannada Kutumba Awards	Popular Actor in Lead Role (Female)	Won		
2023	Triple Riding	SIIMA	Best Female Debut – Kannada	Nominated		
