= Hostel Hudugaru Bekagiddare =

2023 film directed by Nithin Krishnamurthy

- Theatrical release poster
- Directed by: Nithin Krishnamurthy
- Written by: Nithin Krishnamurthy
- Produced by: Varun Gowda; Prajwal B. P. Arvind S. Kashyap; Nithin Krishnamurthy
- Starring: Prajwal B. P. Manjunath Nayaka; Srivatsa; Tejas Jayanna Urs
- Cinematography: Arvind S. Kashyap
- Edited by: Suresh Mallaiah
- Music by: B. Ajaneesh Loknath
- Production companies: Gulmohur Films; Varrun Studios
- Distributed by: Paramvah Studios; Zee Studios
- Release date: 21 July 2023
- Running time: 136 minutes
- Country: India
- Language: Kannada
- Box office: ₹30 crore

Hostel Hudugaru Bekagiddare (transl. Hostel Boys are Wanted) is a 2023 Indian Kannada-language black comedy film directed by Nithin Krishnamurthy in his directorial debut and presented by Rakshit Shetty under Paramvah Pictures banner. The film stars debutants Prajwal BP, Manjunath Nayaka, Rakesh Rajkumar, Srivatsa and Tejas Jayanna Urs, while Rishab Shetty, Pawan Kumar, Shine Shetty and Ramya make cameo appearances.

Hostel Hudugaru Bekagiddare was released on 21 July 2023 to positive reviews from critics. The film was partially re-shot in Telugu as Boys Hostel, where Rashmi Gautam and Tharun Bhascker replaced Ramya and Diganth respectively.

== Plot ==
Ajith is a college student and an aspiring filmmaker residing in Thunga Boys Hostel, who is criticised by his friends for not having a proper "story and structure" in his films. One night before the exams, the hostel warden Ramesh Kumar commits suicide with a note blaming Ajith and his friends behind his death. Without any choice, Ajith and his friends decides to get rid of the body with the help from their "pothead" seniors Genie, Echo and Swami, where unpredictable yet hilarious situation ensues during the process. It is later revealed that Ramesh is actually alive and was helping Ajith in making a short film based on his death in the hostel with the help of Ajith's cousin Nikki, but Ajith did not expected the pothead seniors' help as the story did not demanded it. At 5:00 am, Ajith and his friends soon learn about the truth, but decides to help him in filming the climax. After shooting the climax, everyone heads back to study for their exams and Ramesh decide to correct his duties after realizing his irresponsible behaviour. While preparing for the exams, Ajith and the students learn that the principal has committed suicide as the question paper has been leaked and the exams are cancelled.

== Cast ==
- Prajwal B.P. as Ajith
- Manjunath Nayaka as Warden Ramesh Kumar
- Rakesh Rajkumar
- Srivatsa Shyam as Manja
- Tejas Jayanna Urs as Prasanna
- Shreyas Sharma as Praje
- Bharath Vasisht as Kashi
- Anil Huliya as Jwalla
- Pavan Sharma
- Nithin Krishnamurthy as Genie
- Shravan as Echo
- Venu Madhav
- Gagan Ram as Xavier
- Chethan Durga as Potha
- Mukesh Singh as Rana
- Anirudh Vedanti as Derek
- Archana Kottige as Smitha
- Anoosha K. Bhat as Nisha
- Abhi Das as Keshava
- GJ Krish as Protest Krishna
- Arvind S. Kashyap as Cameraman Nikki

=== Cameo appearances ===
- Ramya as herself
- Rishab Shetty as senior
- Pawan Kumar as senior
- Shine Shetty as senior
- Diganth as Bunty Gowda, an editor

Telugu version

- Rashmi Gautam
- Tharun Bhascker as Bunty Naidu, an editor

The first promo featuring Puneeth Rajkumar was included at the end of the film.

== Soundtrack ==
Hostel Hudugaru Bekagiddare Boys Hostel

Soundtrack album by B. Ajaneesh Loknath
- Released: 2023
- Recorded: 2022
- Studio: AbbsStudios
- Genre: Soundtrack
- Length: 7:33
- Label: A2 Music
- Producers: C. R. Bobby, B. Ajaneesh Loknath,

B. Ajaneesh Loknath chronology
Virupaksha (2023)	Hostel Hudugaru Bekagiddare (2023)	Mangalavaaram (2023)

Singles from Hostel Hudugaru Bekagiddare
- 1. "Protest Song" Released: 5 January 2023; 2. "Boys Sarigilla" Released: 19 July 2023

A2 Music, which holds the audio rights for the film, released the film's first single from its soundtrack album titled as "The Hostel Hudugaru Protest Song" on 5 January 2023. This track was penned by Yogaraj Bhat, composed and sung by B. Ajaneesh Loknath. It was picturised in the premises of a college hostel, and features cameos by Rishab Shetty, Pawan Kumar and Shine Shetty.

Kannada
No.	Title	Lyrics	Singer(s)	Length
1.	"Protest Song"	Yograj Bhat Fans	B. Ajaneesh Loknath	04:22
2.	"Boys Sarigilla"	Trilok Trivikrama	B. Ajaneesh Loknath	03:11

Telugu
No.	Title	Lyrics	Singer(s)	Length
1.	"Protest Song"	Bhaskarabhatla	Sai Charan	04:14
2.	"Boys Rechipothe"	Suresh Banisetti	B. Ajaneesh Loknath	03:00

== Release ==
The Kannada version of the film was released on 21 July 2023. The Telugu version titled Boys Hostel was released on 26 August 2023.

=== Home media ===
The satellite and digital rights of the film were sold to Zee Kannada and ZEE5. The film premiered on ZEE5 on 15 September 2023. The Telugu version was premiered on Aha.

== Reception ==
=== Critical reception ===
Harish Basavarajaiah of The Times of India gave 3.5/5 stars and wrote "Hostel Hudugaru Bekagiddare will make for a perfect weekend watch." Swaroop Kodur of OTTplay gave 3/5 stars and wrote "Nithin Krishnamurthy's high-brow dark comedy runs out of ideas after a point and even begins to stutter a little, but its biggest merit is that it never lets you guess or predict its next move." Latha Srinivasan of India Today gave 3.5/5 stars and wrote "Hostel Hudugaru Bekagiddare is a good directorial debut by director Nithin Krishnamurthy. This unmissable comic caper (presented by Rakshit Shetty) is a film that needs to be watched with your gang of friends – boys or girls." Y Maheswara Reddy of Bangalore Mirror gave 3.5/5 stars and wrote that the film is a worth a watch for those looking for an all-out entertainer.

=== Box office ===
The film grossed ₹1 crore and had a footfalls of 50,000 on its 1st day. The box office collection of the film increased to ₹1.92 crores on its second day due to positive word of mouth. It grossed ₹6.20 crores on its first weekend with a footfalls of 210,000.
