= Tagaru Palya =

2023 Kannada-language film

- Theatrical release poster
- Directed by: Umesh K. Krupa
- Written by: Umesh K. Krupa
- Produced by: Dhananjaya
- Starring: Nagabhushana; Amrutha Prem; Rangayana Raghu
- Cinematography: S. K. Rao
- Edited by: Madhu Thumbakere
- Music by: Vasuki Vaibhav
- Production company: Daali Pictures
- Distributed by: KRG Studios
- Release date: 27 October 2023
- Running time: 130 minutes
- Language: Kannada

Tagaru Palya is a 2023 Indian Kannada-language comedy drama film directed by debutant Umesh K. Krupa and produced by Dhananjaya. The film stars Nagabhushana, Debutant Amrutha Prem, Tara, Sharath Lohithaswa and Rangayana Raghu. The music is composed by Vasuki Vaibhav while the cinematography and editing are handled by S.K. Rao and Madhu Thumbakere.

Tagaru Palya was released on 27 October 2023 to positive reviews from critics.

== Premise ==
Paandappa alias Paandu is a villager living in Mandya who finds a match for his daughter Jyothi and decides to sacrifice a male sheep to celebrate the development. Things turn chaotic when the sheep refuses to cooperate and a bunch of surprising events takes place which forms the crux of the story.

== Cast ==
- Nagabhushana as Chikka
- Amrutha Prem as Jyothi
- Tara as Shantha
- Sharath Lohithaswa as Pandappa's brother
- Chandrakala Mohan as Pandappa's sister-in-law
- Rangayana Raghu as Pandappa aka Pandu
- Vasuki Vaibhav as Karthik, the groom
- Chitra Shenoy as Karthik's mother
- Vaijanath Biradar as Dhoddappa
- Ravi Hunsur as Tammadappa
- Poornachandra Mysore in a special appearance
- Yasha Shivkumar in a special appearance

== Production ==
Principal photography took place in Mandya with Umesha K. Krupa and Dhananjaya.

== Soundtrack ==
The soundtrack was composed by Vasuki Vaibhav and lyrics were written by Dhananjaya.

Tagaru Palya

Soundtrack album by Vasuki Vaibhav
- Released: 2023
- Recorded: 2023
- Studio: Daaali Pictures
- Genre: Soundtrack
- Label: Daali Pictures
- Producer: Dhananjaya

Singles from Tagaru Palya
- 1. "Tagaru Palya title track" Released: 17 August 2023; 2. "Suryakanthi" Released: 14 September 2023

Track list
No.	Title	Singer(s)	Length
1.	"Tagaru Palya Title Track"	Vijay Prakash, Jogila Siddaraju (Chorus: Kalyan Manjunath, Bharath Naik, Darshan Narayan, Vasuki Vaibhav, Gokul Abhishek)	3:23
2.	"Suryakanthi"	Madhuri Seshadri	3:17
3.	"Nondkobyaadve"	Vasuki Vaubhav, Chaithra J Achar	3:32

== Release ==
=== Marketing ===
The first look of the film was released on 7 August 2023. The title track was released coinciding actor Nagabhushana's birthday on 17 August 2023, while the trailer was released by Darshan on 18 October 2023 in Bangalore. The film team also invited CM Siddaramaiah for the film's premiere.

=== Theatrical ===
Initially slated for release on 1 November 2023 coinciding Karnataka Rajyotsava, the film was preponed to hit the theatres on 27 October 2023.

== Reception ==
=== Critical response ===
Tagaru Palya received positive reviews from critics with praise for its plot, cast performances, technical aspects and cinematography.

Pranati A S of Deccan Herald gave 4/5 stars and wrote "The comedy is loud but keeps one enthralled throughout. Extra marks to Vasuki Vaibhav for playing a city IT boy — although exaggerated, it sends you on an unapologetic laughing riot." Harish Basavarajaiah of The Times of India gave 3.5/5 stars and wrote "Tagarupalya has all the right ingredients and can be savoured by the family audience too! What more? It also takes you on a nostalgic trip to your native village." Y. Maheswara Reddy of Bangalore Mirror gave 3.5/5 stars, describe the film as "Family Drama" and praised the film for "featuring a diverse range of characters who provide ample comic relief."

Shashiprasad S. M. of The South First gave 3/5 stars and wrote "Tagaru Palya is fresh and unique for its content and can be happily watched with your family members, including children." Vivek. M. V. of The Hindu wrote "Despite natural performances from Nagabhushana and Tara, Tagaru Palya is wrecked by a generic approach from director Umesh K Krupa." Subha. J. Rao of The News Minute termed it as "a delicious rural drama filled with realistic characters."
