= Kaiva (2023 film) =

- Film poster
- Directed by: Jayatheertha
- Written by: Jayatheertha
- Produced by: Ravindra Kumar
- Starring: Dhanveerah; Megha Shetty
- Cinematography: Shwetpriya Naik
- Edited by: K. M. Prakash
- Music by: B. Ajaneesh Loknath
- Production company: Abhuvanasa Creations
- Release date: 8 December 2023
- Running time: 138 minutes
- Country: India
- Language: Kannada

Kaiva is a 2023 Indian Kannada-language action drama film directed by Jayatheertha and produced by Ravindra Kumar under Abhuvanasa Creations. It stars Dhanveerah and Megha Shetty in lead roles, while Nanda, Raghu Shivmogga, Ugramm Manju, Janvi Rayala, Karthik Jayaram and Dinakar Thoogudeepa appear in supporting roles. The music was composed by B. Ajaneesh Loknath, while the cinematography and editing were handled by Shwetpriya Naik and K. M. Prakash.

Kaiva was released on 8 December 2023 to mixed reviews from critics.

== Plot ==
During the 1980s, Kaiva arrives at Bangalore in search of employment and falls in love with Salma, a mute woman working as a type writer. However, Kaiva and Salma's relationship takes a dark turn as three goons Pakali, Kaleem and Thambu misunderstands Salma as their rival Govindanna's girlfriend. The trio brutally assaults Salma and has her face disfigured by throwing acid. Kaiva decides out to seek revenge against them with the help of Govindanna. Kaiva soon marries Salma and targets Pakali and Kaleem, where he soon kills Pakali and Kaleem. However, Kaiva gets arrested by the police, but he manages to escape from the prison and tracks down Thambu at dancer Rosy's house. Thambu tries to kill Rosy when she calls him impotent, but Kaiva finishes Thambu and returns to the police cell. Govindanna saves Kaiva from prison term and Kaiva reunites with Salma.

== Cast ==
- Dhanveerah as Kaiva
- Megha Shetty as Salma
- Nanda as Pakali
- Raghu Shivmogga as Kaleem
- Ugram Manju as Thambu
- Janvi Rayala as Rozy
- Karthik Jayaram as Devaraj
- Dinakar Thoogudeepa as Raamlal

== Release ==
The film was released on 8 December 2023.

== Reception ==
Kaiva received mixed reviews from critics.

=== Critical response ===
Harish Basavarajaiah of The Times of India gave 4/5 stars and wrote "Kaiva is a beautiful retro love story set in the backdrop of the raging underworld of Bengaluru. It sure makes for a good watch in theatres to go on a nostalgic trip to the 80s." A. Sharadhaa of Cinema Express gave 3/5 stars and wrote "The film opens a window to a bygone era, inviting viewers to witness the tapestry of Bengaluru's history woven intricately with love and turmoil."

Swaroop Kodur of OTTplay gave 2.5/5 stars and wrote "What should have been a taut action thriller is ultimately rendered an overlong saga, as a result." Geethanjali. G of Deccan Herald gave 2/5 stars and described that "Many subplots and elements makes this one a miss" and criticized the "abrupt ending."

Shuklaji of The News Minute wrote "Kaiva is a huge opportunity missed because the premise and the setting offer so much potential for drama and conflict." Vivek M. V of The Hindu wrote "Jayathirtha is a far better filmmaker than what we see here and Kaiva is a misstep in his interesting career thanks to a wobbly screenplay that struggles to find rhythm."
