= Tatsama Tadbhava =

- Directed by: Vishal Atreya
- Screenplay by: Vishal Atreya
- Story by: Vishal Atreya
- Produced by: Pannaga Bharana; Spurthi Anil; Chethan Nanjundaiah
- Starring: Prajwal Devaraj; Meghana Raj; Aravind Iyer; Balaji Manohar
- Cinematography: Srinivas Ramaiah
- Edited by: Ravi Aradhya
- Music by: Vasuki Vaibhav
- Production companies: PB Studios; Anvit Cinemas
- Distributed by: KRG Studios
- Release date: 15 September 2023
- Running time: 115 minutes
- Country: India
- Language: Kannada

Tatsama Tadbhava is a 2023 Indian Kannada-language suspense thriller film directed and written by Vishal Atreya. The film was produced by Pannaga Bharana, along with Spurti Anil and Chethan Nanjundaiah, through two studios, PB Studios and Anvit Cinemas. The film stars Meghana Raj and Prajwal Devaraj in the lead roles. The music was composed by Vasuki Vaibhav, while cinematography and editing were done by Srinivas Ramaiah and Ravi Aradhya, respectively. The story follows a young woman who seeks help from the police after her husband goes missing, followed two decades later by a murder inquiry when the husband's body is discovered. This film marks the return of Meghana Raj to acting after a gap of four years.

The film was released theatrically on 15 September 2023 and received a positive response from both critics and audiences. It was declared one of the top ten films released in 2023 by the Kannada film industry.

== Plot ==
On 23 May 2004, Arika reports her husband, Sanjay, as missing. Eighteen years later, Arika and Sanjay's daughter, Nidhi, goes through the case files of her missing father in an attempt to uncover the truth surrounding his disappearance.

Inspector Aravind Ashwatthama leads the investigation, and the missing person report turns into a murder inquiry. When Arika finds Sanjay's decomposed body inside a trunk in the basement of their own house, Aravind's relentless investigation leads him to several suspects, with Arika becoming the prime suspect in the case.

The case then takes an unexpected turn when Matthew enters and reveals that it is a double murder, with the second victim being his lover, Akira, who is Arika's twin sister.

What follows is a series of interrogations led by Aravind to find Sanjay's killer and, in the process, uncover the truth behind Matthew's allegations. The case files provide answers to Nidhi's questions, but she had not anticipated that those answers would shake her world. Although Aravind solves the case, its mystery will forever remain unsolved.

== Cast ==
- Prajwal Devaraj as Aravind Ashwatthama
- Meghana Raj as Akira / Arika
- Aravind Iyer as Matthew
- Balaji Manohar as Siddharth
- T. S. Nagabharana as Vasudev
- Rajshri Ponnappa as Shalini
- Mahathi Vaishnavi Bhat as Nidhi
- Shruti as Suman
- Girija Lokesh as Savitha
- Devaraj in a guest appearance

== Music ==
The music for the film was composed by Vasuki Vaibhav.

Track listing
No.	Title	Lyrics	Singer(s)	Length
1.	"Doori Laali"	Vasuki Vaibhav	Sunidhi Ganesh	3:24
2.	"Tatsama Tadbhava Title"	Trilok Trivikram	Vasuki Vaibhav	3:30

== Release ==
Tatsama Tadbhava, released on 15 September 2023, received positive reviews from both critics and audiences during its theatrical run. The film's engaging story, along with solid performances by Meghana Raj Sarja and Prajwal Devaraj, contributed to its success, including a 25-day run in theatres. It continued to attract viewers for 36 days before being made available on Prime Video, where it reached a wider audience and gained recognition as a notable crime thriller in Kannada cinema.

== Reception ==
Tatsama Tadbhava opened to an overwhelmingly positive response from critics and audiences alike. The screenplay and direction by Vishal Atreya, marked by its nuanced character development and intensity, demonstrated a seasoned touch, surprising for a debut director. The film's pacing and narrative arc engaged audiences from start to finish and received a commendation. Meghana Raj Sarja portrayed her character with depth and conviction, which drew the audience's admiration and was declared the best performance by a female lead. Prajwal Devaraj shattered the boundaries of a commercial hero with a standout performance. He was willing to push artistic barriers, further solidifying his position as an actor who continues evolving and captivating audiences.

== Critical response ==
Subha J. Rao from the News minute gave the film 4 out of 5 stars and wrote "Vishal Atreya beautifully constructed this thriller, headlined by Meghana Raj and Prajwal Devaraj". Deccan Herald gave it 4 out of 5 stars and wrote, "What lifts an ordinary investigation to an edge-of-the-seat thriller are compelling performances, captivating screenplay, and top-notch technical qualities." Prathiba Joy from OTT Play gave it 4 out of 5 stars and wrote, "Tatsama tadbhava is the kind of film that requires rapt attention from start to finish; every word, every movement, even the slightest flick of a finger, tells a tale".

Harish Basavarajaiah of The Times of India gave the film 3.5 out of 5 stars and wrote "The investigative thriller, aided by good actors and technical brilliance, can be thoroughly enjoyed in theatres". Bangalore Mirror wrote, "Tatsama Tadbhava is a treat for suspense enthusiasts, presenting a twisted narrative that keeps you guessing till the end. Director Vishal Atreya's skillful direction and the cast's stellar performances make this movie a worthy watch for anyone seeking a thrilling cinematic experience."

News18 wrote, "Meghana's performance is a standout, as she embodies her mysterious character with finesse and maintains an enigmatic presence throughout the film. Debutant director Vishal Atreya deserves commendation for his skillful screenplay craftsmanship". The Hindu wrote "Tatsama Tadbhava directed by debutant Vishal Atreya, and starring Prajwal Devaraj and Meghana Raj Sarja, is a gripping thriller helped by a clever plot and a tightly woven screenplay".

A Sharadhaa from The Indian Express wrote "The film's conclusion left a lasting impact, exploring the complexity of situations. Vishal Atreya's debut featured a talented cast, focusing more on conversations than the typical whodunit approach. The film is divided into five engaging segments, delving into the mysteries of a missing husband, an emotional journey, and intriguing inquiries. Meghana Raj Sarja and Prajwal Devaraj delivered compelling performances, anchoring the story effectively." Southfirst wrote "Tatsama Tadbhava is not one of a kind, but it certainly is an unusual whodunnit saga packed and delivered to good effect."

== Home release ==
Tatsama Tadbhava became available for streaming on 20 October 2023, on Amazon Prime Video in Kannada with English subtitles.
