= Dasara (soundtrack) =

2023 soundtrack album

- Soundtrack Album cover

Soundtrack album by Santhosh Narayanan
- Released: 14 April 2023
- Recorded: 2022–2023
- Genre: Feature film soundtrack
- Length: 13:56
- Language: Telugu
- Label: Saregama
- Producer: Santhosh Narayanan

Santhosh Narayanan chronology
Naai Sekar Returns (2022)	Dasara (2023)	Chithha (2023)

Singles from Dasara
- 1. "Dhoom Dhaam Dhosthaan" Released: 3 October 2022; 2. "Ori Vaari" Released: 13 February 2023; 3. "Chamkeela Angeelesi" Released: 8 March 2023; 4. "Oh Ammalaalo Ammalaalo" Released: 24 March 2023; 5. "Celebration of Vennela" Released: 6 April 2023; 6. "Cricket Rap" Released: 10 April 2023

Dasara is the soundtrack album composed by Santhosh Narayanan to the 2023 film of the same name written and directed by Srikanth Odela, and stars Nani and Keerthy Suresh. The soundtrack to the film features 10 songs released under the Saregama record label. It was preceded by six tracks released as singles—"Dhoom Dhaam Dhostham", "Ori Vaari", "Chamkeela Angeelesi", "Oh Ammalaalo Ammalaalo", "Celebration of Vennela" and "Cricket Rap"—followed by the soundtrack released on 14 April 2023. The songs were written by Kasarla Shyam, Sri Mani, Rehman, Gaddam Suresh in Telugu, whereas Vivek, Muthamil, Santhosh Varma, Varadaraj Chikkaballapura, Kausar Munir, Raqueeb Alam, Vinay, Tarun Mathur were credited as the songwriters for the Tamil, Malayalam, Kannada and Hindi versions.

== Development ==
The film is scored by Santhosh Narayanan in his third Telugu venture after Billa Ranga (2013) and Guru (2017). (Note: Remakes of Tamil films Soodhu Kavvum (2013) and Irudhi Suttru (2016), which was also originally scored by Santhosh Narayanan.) Odela and the team wanted a composer giving time and freedom for expressing director's vision in the story, and also providing rooted musicians for the audience. After zeroing multiple musicians, he finalised on Narayanan. In an interview, Narayanan revealed that he heard over 90 scripts from Telugu, where he picked Dasara as he opined it as "one of the best scripts he heard in 10 years". According to Narayanan, the film offered him the space for research and experimentation that went on for more than a year, as being a rooted film with lot of rustic cultural elements, he added:

"It wasn't superficial research where I just call someone or spend time with them, I never do that. We worked really hard for this film [...] In that one year, I learned a lot about that culture. Since I did not know the language I was very careful not to misrepresent anything. In Tamil, we take care of sounds so well, and we ensure certain ethnic sounds are not drowned out by other elements. I wanted to do the same in Dasara, and I found people I could trust with for delivering such an output. It was an amazing experience and I am proud to be part of that film."

Narayanan also praised Srikanth Odela's vision to bring the rustic tonality as "he is very rooted and had a vast knowledge of the region where he comes from" comparing that of Mari Selvaraj's vision towards nativity and rootedness in Pariyerum Perumal (2018). He told Srikanth to do a scratch cut of his song before signing the project, thereby pretending to be a first-time composer for the film.

Narayanan roped in several others musicians from Godavarikhani and neighbouring villages, to reflect the authenticity in the music and sound of rural Telangana. He further recorded the live sounds played by Telangana folk artists, which Nani added in an interview to The Federal, saying that he rarely seen "composers visiting the shooting spot and recording the music of local musicians and musical instruments. But, Santhosh walked the extra mile and came up with the authentic music of the Godavarikhani village."

== Album information ==
Dasara's soundtrack featured ten songs as heard in the film, although Nani claimed only five songs are present in the album. The first single for the film, titled "Dhoom Dhaam Dhostham" was released on 3 October 2022. Nani described the song as "the massiest song ever" before its official release. It was sung by Rahul Sipligunj and Santhosh Narayanan, accompanied by folk artists, Gannora Dasa Laxmi, Gotte Kanakavva, Narsanna (Note: Also known as Nalgonda Gaddar) and Palamuru Jangireddy, and lyrics for the song were written by Kasarla Shyam. The music video of the song was released at an event in Mumbai on 22 March 2023 with Rana Daggubati as the chief guest.

The second single "Ori Vaari" was released on the eve of Valentine's Day, 13 February 2023, which was touted to be a "heartbreak anthem". It was sung by Narayanan and written by Sri Mani. The song was launched coinciding with a promotional event held in Hyderabad, and a promo lyrical video was also released on YouTube. While the Telugu and Tamil versions were released on the same date, the Hindi, Kannada and Malayalam versions were released the following day. The third single "Chamkeela Angeelesi" sung by Ram Miriyala and Dhee, was released on 8 March 2023, in Telugu, Kannada, Malayalam and Hindi, except for the Tamil version which was released on 9 March 2023 as "Mainaru Vetti Katti" with Anirudh Ravichander providing the male vocals.

The fourth song "Oh Ammalaalo Ammalaalo" sung by Anurag Kulkarni and written by Rehman was released as a single on 24 March 2023. Few of the tracks were released after the film. The 46-second instrumental track "Celebration of Vennela", that featured Keerthy Suresh's dance performance, was released on 6 April 2023. "Cricket Rap", performed by Narayanan and Canadian musician Shan Vincent de Paul was released on 10 April 2023. The full soundtrack was later released on digital platforms on 14 April 2023 in Telugu, and 22 April in other dubbed versions.

In mid-April 2023, Santhosh Narayanan confirmed on Twitter, that the one-hour long original score for the film would be released soon.

== Track listing ==
=== Telugu ===
No.	Title	Lyrics	Singer(s)	Length
1.	"Dhoom Dhaam Dhosthaan"	Kasarla Shyam	Rahul Sipligunj, Gotte Kanakavva, Gannora Dasa Laxmi, Palamuru Jangireddy, Narsanna	4:05
2.	"Ori Vaari"	Sri Mani	Santhosh Narayanan	3:37
3.	"Chamkeela Angeelesi"	Kasarla Shyam	Ram Miriyala, Dhee	3:25
4.	"Oh Ammalaalo Ammalaalo"	Rehman	Anurag Kulkarni	2:48
5.	"Celebration of Vennela"	—	Santhosh Narayanan	0:47
6.	"Cricket Rap"	Kasarla Shyam, Shan Vincent de Paul	Shan Vincent de Paul, Santhosh Narayanan	2:45
7.	"Silk Bar"	Gaddam Suresh	Narsanna, Kanakavva	3:08
8.	"Chithu"	Gaddam Suresh	Kanakavva	1:57
9.	"Ee Dharani"	Rehman	Anurag Kulkarni	0:55
10.	"Monna Badilo"	Gaddam Suresh	Pavithra Chari	4:42
Total length:				28:10

=== Tamil ===
No.	Title	Lyrics	Singer(s)	Length
1.	"Dhoom Dhaam Dhosthu"	Vivek	Santhosh Narayanan, Santhosh Hariharan, Meenakshi Ilayaraja	4:03
2.	"Theekari"	Vivek	Santhosh Narayanan	3:35
3.	"Mainaru Vetti Katti"	Muthamil	Anirudh Ravichander, Dhee	3:24
4.	"Oh Thallelaalo Thallelaalo"	Muthamil	Anurag Kulkarni	2:48
5.	"Pinji Manasa"	Muthamil	Pavithra Chari	4:40
6.	"Silk Bar"	Muthamil	Muthamil, Pavithra Chari	3:08
7.	"Sittha Sivanoda Ponnu"	Muthamil	Aparna Harikumar	1:56
8.	"Yaar Maraindhuthan"	Muthamil	Anurag Kulkarni	0:54
Total length:				24:28

=== Malayalam ===
No.	Title	Lyrics	Singer(s)	Length
1.	"Dhoom Dhaam Dhosthay"	Santhosh Varma	Santhosh Hariharan, Maalavika Sundar, Santhosh Narayanan	4:03
2.	"O Bhayee"	Santhosh Varma	Vijay Narain	3:35
3.	"Pala Palaa Minnerunne"	Santhosh Varma	Aparna Harikumar, Santhosh Hariharan	3:23
4.	"Aariraaro Raariraaro"	Santhosh Varma	Anurag Kulkarni	2:48
5.	"Engu Poye"	Santhosh Varma	Pavithra Chari	4:40
6.	"Chinna Chindhura"	Santhosh Varma	Aparna Harikumar	1:56
7.	"Silk Bar"	Santhosh Varma	Aparna Harikumar, Yadhu Krishnan	3:07
8.	"Ee Dharani"	Santhosh Varma	Anurag Kulkarni	0:54
Total length:				24:26

=== Kannada ===
No.	Title	Lyrics	Singer(s)	Length
1.	"Dhoom Dhaam Dhosthaa"	Varadaraj Chikkaballapura	Santhosh Hariharan, Maalavika Sundar, Santhosh Narayanan	4:03
2.	"Orr Vaari"	Varadaraj Chikkaballapura	Vijay Narain	3:35
3.	"Hoovina Angi Thottu"	Varadaraj Chikkaballapura	Amrit Ramnath, Amira Gill	3:24
4.	"Oh Ammalaali Ammalaali"	Varadaraj Chikkaballapura	Anurag Kulkarni	2:48
5.	"Silk Bar"	Varadaraj Chikkaballapura	Abhijit Rao, Pavithra Chari	3:08
6.	"Muthu"	Varadaraj Chikkaballapura	Pavithra Chari	1:56
7.	"Ee Dharani"	Varadaraj Chikkaballapura	Anurag Kulkarni	0:54
8.	"Monne Saleya"	Varadaraj Chikkaballapura	Pavithra Chari	4:40
Total length:				24:28

=== Hindi ===
No.	Title	Lyrics	Singer(s)	Length
1.	"Dhoom Dhaam Dhos Yaar"	Raqueeb Alam	Raqueeb Alam, Santhosh Hariharan, Amira Gill, Santhosh Narayanan	4:03
2.	"O Re Chore"	Kausar Munir	Vijay Narain	3:35
3.	"Chamkeeli Bushirt Mein"	Kausar Munir	Amrit Ramnath, Sarthak Kalyani, Amira Gill	3:23
4.	"Oh Muskaa Do Muskaa Do"	Kausar Munir	Anurag Kulkarni	2:48
5.	"Hey Bhagwan Kya"	Tarun Mathur	Pavithra Chari	1:56
6.	"Is Dharti"	Vinay	Anurag Kulkarni	0:54
7.	"Jaan Se Pyaara"	Kausar Munir	Pavithra Chari	4:36
8.	"Silk Bar"	Tarun Mathur	Santhosh Narayanan, Pavithra Chari	3:07
9.	"Celebration of Vennela"	—	Santhosh Narayanan	0:46
Total length:				25:08

== Background score ==
Dasara

Film score by Santhosh Narayanan
- Released: 12 May 2023
- Recorded: 2022–2023
- Genre: Film score
- Length: 58:19
- Language: Telugu
- Label: Saregama
- Producer: Santhosh Narayanan

No.	Title	Length
1.	"Announcement Music"	0:50
2.	"Best Friends"	1:41
3.	"Change of Heart"	0:31
4.	"Chinna Nambi"	1:12
5.	"Chithoo Chithoolabomma"	1:59
6.	"Darani Cricket Match"	1:29
7.	"Dasara Trailer BGM"	2:17
8.	"Dharani Ties the Knot"	0:52
9.	"Dharaniga ft. Embar Kannan"	1:42
10.	"Dharani's Entry"	0:45
11.	"Dharani's Revenge"	1:25
12.	"Equality"	1:21
13.	"Hero"	1:02
14.	"Idisheyantu Sir"	0:58
15.	"It Haunts"	1:10
16.	"Longing"	0:57
17.	"Love Lost"	0:41
18.	"Dasara Motion Poster Music"	0:54
19.	"Nambi's Attack"	0:56
20.	"Nambi's Lust"	2:35
21.	"Nee Yavva Baanchath"	1:04
22.	"Ori Vari"	1:01
23.	"Political Game Begins"	1:51
24.	"Preparing for War"	1:39
25.	"Rajanna"	1:10
26.	"Realisation"	1:30
27.	"Revealation"	2:12
28.	"Ruthless"	1:16
29.	"Sharpen The Knife"	1:04
30.	"Silk Bar Politics"	1:10
31.	"Sinnavaye Silku Baru Soodu"	2:47
32.	"The Burning House"	0:54
33.	"The Darkest Hour"	1:48
34.	"The Killing"	1:39
35.	"The Match Begins"	0:36
36.	"The War"	4:46
37.	"Thick as Thieves"	0:55
38.	"Veerlapalli"	1:02
39.	"Vennela Dharani"	0:58
40.	"Vennela"	0:58
41.	"Why.??"	1:06
42.	"Women of Veeralapalli"	1:18
Total length:		58:19

== Reception ==
Reviewing "Dhoom Dhaam Dhostham", The Indian Express called it as "a typical Santhosh Narayanan rural number that also reflects the rustic flavour the film is aiming for" and also reminiscent of his earlier composition, "Paandi Naatu Kodi" from Jigarthanda (2014) due to the similarities between the music and visuals. For "Chamkeela Angeelesi", a critic from The Times of India, called it as "apt for every wedding season" and praised the use instrumentation as it brings authenticity. Vishal Menon of Film Companion wrote "Santhosh Narayanan seems to be at home driving home points when the frames struggle to convey the same. A poorly framed cricket match sequence leading up to a "hero shot" is saved once the rap music kicks in. Similarly, a melodramatic sequence right at the end is saved by a simple background score that reduces the general pitch of the scene." 123Telugu commented "Santhosh Narayanan gives the best music that uplifts many scenes in the film." Sangeetha Devi Dundoo of The Hindu praised Narayanan's "rustic-meets-jazzy haunting musical score". Venkat Arikatla from Great Andhra reviewed "the album has nothing more than one good song. While Dhoom Dhaam is fast-paced, Ori Veri is dull and finally Chamkeela Angeelesi is a catchy melodic number with a rustic flavor." Chirag Sehgal of News18 felt that the songs are "forced" as "they don't fit well and divert our attention from the seriousness of the movie". Mirchi9 wrote "Santhosh Narayanan composes for a direct Telugu film after a very long gap. He infuses life into the proceedings with his songs and background score. His unique sound is refreshing, adding a layer of freshness to the proceedings."
