= Pachuvum Athbutha Vilakkum =

2023 Indian comedy drama film

- Theatrical release poster
- Directed by: Akhil Sathyan
- Written by: Akhil Sathyan
- Produced by: Sethu Mannarkkad
- Starring: Fahadh Faasil; Anjana Jayaprakash; Mukesh; Innocent; Vineeth
- Cinematography: Sharan Velayudhan
- Edited by: Akhil Sathyan
- Music by: Justin Prabhakaran
- Production company: Full Moon Cinema
- Distributed by: Full Moon Cinema
- Release date: 28 April 2023
- Running time: 170 minutes
- Country: India
- Language: Malayalam
- Box office: est. ₹17.2 crore (US$1.8 million)

Pachuvum Athbutha Vilakkum (transl. Pachu and the Magic Lamp) is a 2023 Indian Malayalam-language adventure-comedy-drama film written and directed by Akhil Sathyan in his directorial debut. The film stars Fahadh Faasil in the titular role, along with Anjana Jayaprakash, Mukesh, Innocent, Vineeth, and Indrans. It is produced by Sethu Mannarkkad under the banner of Full Moon Cinema. The film was released on 28 April 2023 and received critical positive response from critics and audiences and was a commercial success. This movie is noted as one of the last appearances of Innocent.

== Plot ==
Prasanth alias Pachu owns an ayurveda pharmacy store/clinic in Mumbai. He is well-liked but unmarried and is looking for a prospective bride. During a visit to his hometown in Kochi for business, he goes to a wedding with his father, Rajan where he meets Achu who he likes. Rajan's friend suggests a marriage proposal, and they visit Achu's house. However, Pachu chokes on a fish bone and is rushed to an emergency room, missing his flight back to Mumbai.

Riyas, the landlord of Pachu's store, requests him to accompany his elderly mother, Laila, who is traveling to Mumbai by train. On the train, they meet a young boy, Ashwin, who is traveling alone. During the night, Laila furtively disembarks at Karmali station in Goa. Pachu wakes up, realises this and rushes off after her. Ashwin follows him believing that they have arrived in Mumbai. When Pachu confronts Laila, she pepper sprays him before leaving the station.

Pachu then follows Laila to a house. Hamsadhwani, who lives there, is unwilling to help them. He calls Riyas, who rushes to Goa to find his mother. Laila is eventually found and they all prepare to fly to Mumbai. At the airport, she apologises to Pachu and Ashwin for pepper spraying them and tells them her reasons. Laila narrates the story of Nidhi, the daughter of their maid Geeta in Mumbai. Noting Nidhi's intelligence and desire to learn, Laila encourages and pays for her education. However, after her 10th standard exams, she is sent back to Goa to live with her grandfather and work as a maid there. Nidhi wants to continue her studies and asks Laila for help through Hamsadhwani. This was why Laila traveled by train and disembarked in Goa.

Laila now offers Pachu ownership of her ayurveda store if he can find and bring back Nidhi. Pachu agrees and sets off to find Nidhi. With the help of Hamsadhwani, Pachu finds Nidhi's house and goes there to meet her. However, he is beaten up by her brother Savio who is a thug. He is again helped by Hamsadhwani and stays with her while purporting to pursue a police case against his attackers. Even though he recovers his belongings, he keeps this a secret from Hamsadhwani so that he can spend more time with her. They both become close to each other and Pachu assists her in ending a toxic relationship with her boyfriend. Pachu finds an opportune moment and plans to leave with Nidhi, however, this is discovered by Nidhi's step grandmother and Savio, who refuse to let her leave. Riyas, who was once opposed to Laila's decision, now supports her in bringing Nidhi back.

Pachu makes another attempt to save Nidhi and fight off Savio and his friends. They try to kill them but her grandfather intervenes, allowing her to leave. Pachu and Nidhi travel to Kerala to reunite her with Laila. Nidhi joins a college to continue her studies. During his train journey back to Mumbai, Pachu listens to a message from Hamsadhwani and decides to disembark as the train stops at Karmali station in order to go and meet her and reunites.

== Cast ==
- Fahadh Faasil as Prasanth 'Pachu' Rajan, Pharmacist
- Anjana Jayaprakash as Hamsadhwani
- Dhwani Rajesh as Nidhi, Geeta's daughter
- Viji Venkatesh as Laila (Ummachi), Riyas's mother
- Vineeth as Riyas, Laila's son and Pachu's shop owner
- Mukesh as Rajan, Pachu's father
- Innocent as Vasu, Rajan's friend
- Indrans as Raveendran 'Ravi'
- Althaf Salim as Sujith
- Abhiram Radhakrishnan as Peter, Riyas's driver
- Shanthi Krishna as Anitha Rajan, Pachu's mother
- Nandu as Pradeep, Vasu's friend
- Avyukth Menon as Ashwin (Chottu), Arun's younger brother
- Chhaya Kadam as Nani
- Piyush Kumar as Savio, Nidhi's brother
- Govind Pai as Loki
- Remya Suresh as Sulochana, Riyas' house help in Kerala
- Veena Nair as Dr. Alice
- Srikant Murali as Jose
- Dilina Ramakrishnan as Saira, Riyas's wife
- Jain K Paul as Panjim Sub Inspector Lokesh Naik
- Sanju Sivram as Vivek, Hamsadhwani's fiancée
- Mohan Agashe as Nana, Nidhi's grandfather
- Devika Daftardar as Geeta, Nidhi's mother
- Sonia Giri as Latha, Pradeep's wife

Cameo appearances

- Ahaana Krishna as Aishwarya 'Achu' Pradeep, Pradeep's daughter
- Naslen as Arun, Ashwin's elder brother
- Shruti Ramachandran as a train passenger
- Anoop Sathyan as a bus passenger

== Production ==
=== Development ===
The title poster of the film was released in January 2021.

=== Filming ===
The principal photography comprised two schedules: the first in Kochi and Mumbai, and the second in Palakkad and Goa. The entire shooting wrapped in November 2022. Film noted debuted for the director. Later, the trailer was released.

== Reception ==
=== Critical reception ===
This film received generally positive reviews from critics. Sajin Shrijith critic from Cinema Express gave 3.5 out of 5 stars and stated that "but not too syrupy, experience that would leave a smile on my face, and that's exactly what I got". Anna Mathews critic of Times of india wrote that "This is definitely a movie reminiscent of sweet 80s-90s films and one to watch with the family." and gave 3.5 out 5 stars. G. Ragesh critic of Onmanorama stated that "Avyukt Menon as the cute and funny little boy on his way back to Mumbai from Sabarimala was a joy.". A critic from Indian Express wrote that "Overall, for those seeking a relaxed viewing experience this weekend, Pachuvum Athbutha Vilakkum is likely a satisfactory choice." and gave 2.5 stars out of 5

=== Box office ===
The film grossed around ₹43 lakh (US$46,000) on its opening day from Kerala. The total worldwide collection grossed around ₹17.2 crore (US$1.8 million), with ₹11 crore (US$1.2 million) from Kerala and ₹4.45 crore (US$480,000) from overseas.
