= 2018 (soundtrack) =

Soundtrack album by Nobin Paul and William Francis
- Released: 10 May 2023
- Recorded: 2023
- Genre: Feature film soundtrack
- Length: 11:31
- Language: Malayalam
- Label: Think Music
- Producer: Nobin Paul; William Francis

Nobin Paul chronology
777 Charlie (2022)	2018 (2023)	Life is Beautiful (2023)

William Francis chronology
Enthada Saji (2023)	2018 (2023)	Thankamani (2023)

2018 is the soundtrack to the 2023 Malayalam-language survival drama film of the same name directed by Jude Anthany Joseph. The film is scored by Nobin Paul in his Malayalam debut, and featured four songs composed by Nobin, with one song "Minnal Minnane" was composed by William Francis. Joe Paul wrote lyrics for the songs. The soundtrack to the film was released by Think Music on 10 May 2023, five days after the film's release. The track "Minnal Minnane" was released as a single on 4 May.

== Development ==
After watching 777 Charlie, Joseph appreciated Nobin Paul for his work in the film and shared his intentions on a possible collaboration. When Nobin met him at the production of the film in Vaikom during May 2022, he thought of discussing on a collaboration in another film, but he was told to score music for this film. In November 2022, he was brought onboard as the film's composer. In order to be available for scoring the film, Paul had rejected five films from Kannada that came post the success of 777 Charlie.

Nobin felt that composing a disaster film had "immense scope" for a musician mostly through the background score as it elevates the drama and emotions onscreen. He overlaid the film's background score with the sounds of rain and thunder associated with it and did not want the music to be too low or loud and has to convey the drama onscreen. He described it as challenging but felt that the end result was "phenomenal" insisting the audience to watch it on theatres equipped with Dolby Atmos. Unlike 777 Charlie which had 10 songs, Paul had composed three numbers due to its limited scope and two of them were performed by his daughter Ezra. One song for the film was composed by William Francis.

While composing for the introductory sea sequence, sound designer Vishnu Govind assisted Nobin by sending the sound while the background music being composed so that it could be heard with the voice. And for the climax sequence, the helicopter uses a mix of sound and music during the rescue mission and was emphasized until the climatic moments.

The music was recorded during January 2023 and was completed within three months, which Nobin felt as the fastest ever he had worked; he composed 777 Charlie over five years. Nobin said "Since I had not worked on a subject like this before, it took me a couple of days to get into the zone, but once that happened, I was churning out stuff at break-neck speed." Nobin primarily used orchestral music for the film that was recorded live in Thiruvananthapuram and Bangalore. Initially, Nobin wanted to recruit international musicians to work on the film but due to the insufficient time he had while composing, he worked on with local musicians for scoring the film. Some of the instrumentalists had also worked with Nobin on his previous film 777 Charlie.

== Track listing ==
All lyrics are written by Joe Paul.

No.	Title	Music	Singer(s)	Length
1.	"Minnal Minnane"	William Francis	Shankar Mahadevan	1:57
2.	"Venmegham"	Nobin Paul	K. S. Harisankar	3:15
3.	"Innithile"	Nobin Paul	Ezma Nobin, Madhuri Seshadri	3:21
4.	"Uyirayi Maarave"	Nobin Paul	K. S. Harisankar	1:19
5.	"Save Me"	Nobin Paul	Kashyap Rammohan, Ezra Nobin, Shubhangini	1:38
Total length:				11:31

== Reception ==
Allan Hunter of Screen International called it as a "stirring, bombastic score". Gopika Is of The Times of India and Nishad Thaivalappil of News18 praised the music being "well-suited and not too jarring" and "enhances the narrative and evoke a range of emotions". Anandu Suresh of The Indian Express stated that Nobin's music creates "a fantastic atmosphere that will evoke feelings of déjà vu".

Princy Alexander of Onmanorama said that Nobin's music "also does justice to the movie". Anna M. M. Vetticad of Firstpost was more critical of the music as she felt it being "overused to evoke melodrama and highlight emotion, and played at an excessive volume, when the film could have rested primarily on the shoulders of a sound designer effectively capturing the rain, the wind and all the other sounds of nature that you would expect in such a scenario."
