= Maamannan (soundtrack) =

Soundtrack album by A. R. Rahman
- Released: 1 June 2023
- Recorded: 2022–2023
- Genre: Feature film soundtrack
- Length: 34:27
- Language: Tamil
- Label: Sony Music India
- Producer: A. R. Rahman

A. R. Rahman chronology
Ponniyin Selvan: II (2023)	Maamannan (2023)	Pippa (2023)
External audio
- Official Audio Jukebox on YouTube

Singles from Maamannan
- 1. "Raasa Kannu" Released: 19 May 2023; 2. "Jigu Jigu Rail" Released: 27 May 2023

Maamannan is the soundtrack to the 2023 Tamil-language political drama film of the same name directed by Mari Selvaraj and starring Vadivelu. The music and original score is composed by A. R. Rahman, replacing Mari's norm composer Santhosh Narayanan, for their first-time collaboration. Lyrics for the songs were written by Yugabharathi, while one song was written by Arivu. The album was released on 1 June 2023 at an audio launch event held in Chennai.

== Background ==
Rahman, in an interview with The New Indian Express said it was "essential to venture beyond my comfort zone" and attributed that the "emerging talents bring a fresh perspective to the table. They possess a striking vision and an innovative approach to storytelling that invigorates me", calling it a "liberating feeling" to venture into new territory rather than continue with the familiar. In May 2023, Vadivelu recorded a song. The song, later titled "Raasa Kannu", was released as a single on 19 May. Vadivelu also performed the song at the film's audio launch. Mari noted that Rahman had expected the music to be on the lines of Kizhakku Cheemayile (1993); however he asked him for a song that sounds similar to Bob Marley's "Zion Train", which resulted in him composing the Westernised number "Jigu Jigu Rail". Mari said he wanted even non-Indians to watch and understand the film, and felt an effective tool when taking local stories to the world is music.

== Release ==
"Raasa Kannu" released as the first single on 19 May 2023, followed by "Jigu Jigu Rail" on 27 May. The audio launch was held on 1 June 2023 at the Nehru Stadium, Chennai. Rahman and his musical team performed the songs from the film live. A reprise version of the song "Nenjame Nenjame" performed by Deva, was released as a single on 12 July 2023.

== Track listing ==
No.	Title	Lyrics	Singer(s)	Length
1.	"Kodi Parakura Kaalam"	Yugabharathi	Kalpana Raghavendar, Rakshita Suresh, Deepthi Suresh, Aparna Harikumar	4:00
2.	"Nenjame Nenjame"	Yugabharathi	Vijay Yesudas, Shakthisree Gopalan	6:50
3.	"Utchanthala"	Yugabharathi	Deepthi Suresh, Sireesha Bhaguvatula, Pavithra Chari	4:59
4.	"Manna Maamanna"	Arivu	Arivu	3:36
5.	"Veerane"	Yugabharathi	A. R. Ameen	4:13
6.	"Raasa Kannu"	Yugabharathi	Vadivelu	5:27
7.	"Jigu Jigu Rail"	Yugabharathi	A. R. Rahman	5:17
Total length:				34:25

Bonus track
No.	Title	Lyrics	Singer(s)	Length
1.	"Nenjame Nenjame" (Reprise)	Yugabharathi	Deva	1:18
Total length:				35:43

== Reception ==
Vipin Nair of Music Aloud rated four stars out of five indicating "Rahman's incredible run of form continues" with this film. Gopinath Rajendran of The Hindu called the songs as "ear-pleasers" but criticized the background score as "tad underwhelming". K. Janani of India Today claimed that "Being a rural film, Rahman, with his Western tunes, has given a new colour to the film." Bharathy Singaravel of The News Minute commented that Rahman's "flawless music" complemented the cinematography, with the tracks "Raasa Kannu" and "Jigu Jigu Rail" being demanded "repeat listening". Lakshmi Subramaniam of The Week wrote "A.R. Rahman's background music is top-notch as it expresses the anger and pain within a man who is oppressed by societal norms."
