= Aachar & Co =

- Poster
- Directed by: Sindhu Sreenivasa Murthy
- Written by: Sindhu Sreenivasa Murthy; Kanan Gill; Trilok (dialogues)
- Produced by: Ashwini Puneeth Rajkumar; Gurudath A Talwar
- Starring: Sindhu Sreenivasa Murthy; Vamsidhar Bhogaraju; Harshil Koushik; Anirudh Acharya; Jagadishwar Sukumar
- Cinematography: Abhimanyu Sadanandan
- Edited by: Ashik Kusugolli
- Music by: Bindhumalini
- Production company: PRK Productions
- Distributed by: KRG Studios
- Release date: 28 July 2023
- Running time: 103 minutes
- Country: India
- Language: Kannada

Aachar & Co (Note: Aachar (variant of Acharya, Achari, etc.) is a name suffix used by Kannada Brahmins, in this case applied to the character played by Ashok. As a pun, in Hindi it also means pickle. Aachar & Co refers to Aachar's family.) is a 2023 Indian Kannada-language coming-of-age comedy-drama film written and directed by Sindhu Sreenivasa Murthy and starring herself, Vamsidhar Bhogaraju, Harshil Koushik, Anirudh Acharya and Jagadishwar Sukumar. The movie marked the directorial debut of Sindhu. The movie had mostly women technicians, which is a rarity in Sandalwood.

The film was released on 28 July 2023. It opened to mixed to positive reviews from critics but the movie went to complete 25 days at the box office by striking a chord with the female audience.

== Plot ==
Madhusudhan Aachar, a government engineer, lives a traditional and privileged life in early 1960s Jayanagar, Bengaluru with his wife Savithri and nine of their ten children. As an orthodox Brahmin patriarch, he places uniformly high expectations on his children, attempting to shape their life paths, careers and marriages per his wishes. To his chagrin, his sons do not fulfill his desires; his eldest son Sudheendra and his second son Raghu don't follow his footsteps in becoming a government engineer, becoming a government surveyor and a sales representative respectively. Meanwhile, the third and youngest son, Jaggu, skips school to watch films, drink with his buddies and aspires to become an actor without anyone's knowledge. On the other hand, Madhusudhan doesn't care about his daughters' education and career, solely focusing on marrying them off. Thus, their third daughter Suma persistently declares that she will find a well-off groom and settle in London. One day, Madhusudhan finally learns of Jaggu's truancy, while Raghu states his intentions to move out to Basavanagudi due to a lack of space in the house and Sudheendra announces his promotion and planned departure of his own to Delhi. Frustated by his sons' behaviours and shocked that Sudheendra talked back to him after his scolding, Madhusudhan dies of a heart attack.

As they lose income and privileges after Madhusudhan's death and Sudheendra accepts his new job in Delhi, Raghu reluctantly stays home, becoming head of household. As social attitudes change in the late 1960s, he emphasises the younger girls' education and makes Jaggu and Suma get jobs to rescue the family's financial situation. Suma resents this as she only wants marriage, feeling Raghu doesn't put enough effort into finding her a husband and jealous her younger friends are already married. Meanwhile, Jaggu continues his acting career, gaining more recognition but lying at home that he is gainfully employed. Raghu brings proposals but Suma find them all unsuitable, only desiring an overseas alliance. When another potential groom named Krishna comes over, his family rejects Suma due to her lack of higher education and arranges his marriage with her younger sister Uma instead who agrees, angering Suma. The tension between Raghu and Suma come to a head at his promotion dinner, where he publicly rebukes Suma after she accuses him of failing to find her a suitable man by pointing to her mismatched expectations. Raghu later tries to apologize but Suma stays silent. Later that night, when he takes his pregnant wife Rukmini to her parents' home, he dies in a crash, shocking Suma who regrets she couldn't make up with him.

Raghu's death forces everyone to share responsibilities, with all the children taking up jobs entering the 1970s. Uma returns home for Jaggu's wedding and stays for an unusually long time; seeing her crying and sensing marital strife, Suma advises her to return to her husband's home and resolve their issues. Jaggu's friend Srinath comes to their home to propose to the youngest sister Leela. She thinks of rejecting him for his lack of education; in a complete shift, Suma tells her to focus on his personality and not his qualifications. Leela decides to marry Srinath; at her wedding, Uma comes back with Krishna, where Suma discovers that Krishna had been physically abusing her. Suma publicly confronts Krishna and apologizes to Uma for trying to send her back. However, Srinath finds that Leela is missing and sets out with Suma to find her. It turns out she is still at work as a bank teller, having feared that Srinath and his family would make her quit; Srinath reassures her they wouldn't and the wedding continues. On the way back, Leela's boss praises Suma's mango pickles (aachar), which she prepares for her neighbours and Leela's office, and points out she can sell them, offering a bank loan. The film ends with Suma helping Uma file a divorce, looking for a husband on her own, and developing her business, Aachar & Co., into a major enterprise employing many other women.

== Cast ==
- Sindhu Sreenivasa Murthy as Suma
- Vamsidhar Bhogaraju as Sudheendra
- Harshil Koushik as Raghu
- Anirudh Acharya as Jaggu
- Jagadishwar Sukumar as Jaggu
- Vamsidhar Bhogaraju as Lokesh
- Mandara Battalahalli as Sheela
- Ashok as Madhusudhan Aachar
- Sudha Belawadi as Savithri
- Sonu Venugopal as Chandra

== Production ==
The film's concept originated from Murthy's nostalgia for the "simpler times" of the late 20th century, which led her to discover the ways that women silently broke the mold and spurned stereotypes in the 1960s and 1970s. She pitched the story to Puneeth Rajkumar and his wife Ashwini in 2020, who both approved, produced and assisted with the film. According to Murthy, the cast and crew being mostly women had come about organically rather than being a conscious choice. Although the film was set in Bengaluru, production took place in Mysore since the city better preserved the architecture of the time, with an unused staff quarters building at the University of Mysore being used for the Aachar house.

== Themes and influence ==
The movie was heavily inspired by Wes Anderson aesthetics.The film also has a gentle commentary on patriarchy and feminism.

== Soundtrack ==
The music was composed by Bindhumalini. "Bengaluru's Suprabhata", based on the popular M. S. Subbulakshmi rendition of the Suprabhatam, was the first song to be released and the song became an instant hit among the audience with its catchy lyrics and the peppy track. The Next release was "Pickle Song" which also became one of the chartbusters with praise for its whimsical lyrics accompanied by its cheerful music.

Track listing
No.	Title	Lyrics	Singer(s)	Length
1.	"Bengaluru's Suprabhata"	Trilok Trivikrama	Rama Mani	2:46
2.	"Pickle Song"	Trilok Trivikrama	Emmjee, Deepika Kumar, Preethi Bharadwaj, Bindhumalini Narayanaswamy	3:03
3.	"Baavi Kappe"	Trilok Trivikrama	Bindhumalini, Anjana Rajagopalan	3:54
4.	"Sapthaswara"	Avinash Belakalla	Varijashree Venugopal, Bindhumalini, Nakul Abhyankar, Anjana Rajagopalan	3:57
Total length:				13:40

== Reception ==
A critic from Deccan Herald wrote that "If you want to reminisce about the good old Bangalore, travel through its traffic-free, tree-lined lanes, breathe its crisp air and prefer your pickles saved in large ceramic jars and sparingly served in smaller ones, then 'Aachar & Co.' is homemade for you". A critic from Bangalore Mirror wrote that "All in all, it is a clean movie worth a watch for the whole family". A critic from The Times of India wrote that "With Bengaluru weather providing an apt backdrop, Aachar & Co makes for a perfect family outing this weekend, especially when accompanied by parents and grandparents, who can surely enjoy the nostalgia". A critic from The South First wrote that "Despite some flaws, Aachar & Co. is relevant in many terms; for it talks about the essence of family bonding and how life moves on despite all the hurdles one may face in their life". A critic from The New Indian Express wrote that "Achar and Co delves into essential themes such as women's empowerment, family bonding, and self-reliance, as it provides a glimpse into the life of a woman in that era. While the film can be a delightful ode to the past, it also raises a pertinent question... Have things really changed?"

In contrast, a critic from The Hindu wrote that "Aachar & Co. is a harmless film, but it's hard to dismiss the fact that it exists without a bigger purpose. Even if small in scale, it could have offered us the excitement of watching a period drama on the big screen with solid writing". A critic from The News Minute wrote that "Ultimately, you are likely to walk out of the hall feeling that Aachar & Co. is a bit of a missed opportunity. It's genuinely refreshing to see a woman filmmaker being backed by a mainstream entity like PRK Productions and that together, they have tried to bring something very unconventional to the fore".

== Accolades ==
Sindhu Sreenivasa Murthy was selected for the BAFTA Breakthrough Talent Award 2024-25 for this movie.
