= Kushi (soundtrack) =

Kushi (Original Motion Picture Soundtrack)
- Telugu version cover

Soundtrack album by Hesham Abdul Wahab
- Released: 15 August 2023
- Recorded: 2022–2023
- Studios: HW Studio, Kochi; Gaweh Music Studio, Mumbai; Jubilee10 Studios, Hyderabad; Soundtown Studios, Chennai; UNO Records, Chennai; The Mystics Room, Chennai; My Studio, Kochi; MLounge Studio, Kochi; Studio504, Mumbai; Future Sound of Bombay, Mumbai
- Genre: Feature film soundtrack
- Length: 19:50
- Language: Telugu
- Label: Saregama
- Producer: Hesham Abdul Wahab

Hesham Abdul Wahab chronology
Madhura Manohara Moham (2023)	Kushi (Original Motion Picture Soundtrack) (2023)	Sesham Mike-il Fathima (2023)

Singles from Kushi
- 1. "Na Roja Nuvve" Released: 9 May 2023; 2. "Aradhya" Released: 12 July 2023; 3. "Kushi Title Song" Released: 28 July 2023

Kushi (Original Motion Picture Soundtrack) is the soundtrack album to the 2023 film of the same name directed by Shiva Nirvana and starring Vijay Deverakonda and Samantha Ruth Prabhu. The film is scored by Hesham Abdul Wahab whose soundtrack featured five songs with lyrics written by Nirvana himself. Madhan Karky, Arun Alat, V. Nagendra Prasad and Raqueeb Alam wrote the lyrics for the Tamil, Malayalam, Kannada and Hindi versions, respectively. The soundtrack was released under the Saregama label on 15 August 2023, preceded by three singles.

== Development ==
In March 2022, it was reported that Anirudh Ravichander would score music for the film. However, with the film's launch in April 2022, it was confirmed that Malayalam composer Hesham Abdul Wahab would score music for the film in his Telugu cinema debut. Wahab attributed that the success of his compositions for Hridayam (2022) had caught the attention of filmmakers from Telugu industry. He added that the production company Mythri Movie Makers asked on his arrival to Hyderabad so that he could compose a song for his involvement, to which Hesham agreed.

"The story of Kushi revolves around Kashmir, and it was important that I get acquainted with the energy and vibe of the place. I went to Kashmir, and spent a lot of time with our team, exploring the sounds there. I believe music is a journey, and while working on Kushi it was crucial that I understand the kinds of instruments popular around that particular place."

— Hesham Abdul Wahab on composing music for Kushi

Music sessions for the film began in Kashmir. Wahab was influenced by the culture and landscape of Kashmir, which helped to conceptualize the tunes and curate them which uses an Asian soundscape. He met Kashmiri musicians which used instruments specifically for the region, including a Rababi group which performed spiritual music. Around 50 musicians have been employed in the project, with Wahab closely working with 25–30 people. He composed five tunes in a 60-hour stretch, which Wahab usually does for his previous films.

Besides directing, Nirvana wrote lyrics for all the tracks. Nirvana narrated the first few lines of the song "Na Roja Nuvve" which Wahab immediately set to tune. As he liked his work, Wahab insisted to write lyrics for all the other songs as well. Each songs were recorded within a week's time. The lyrics of "Naa Roja Nuvve" and more noticeably, the Tamil dubbed version, "En Roja Neeye", references twelve of Mani Ratnam's films owing to the protagonist's liking of the Ratnam and A. R. Rahman combo. The films are mentioned in the following order, Roja (1992), Dil Se (1998), Anjali (1990), Geethanjali (1989), Kadal (2013), Alai Payuthey (2000), Mouna Raagam (1986), Kaatru Veliyidai (2017), Iruvar (1997), Nayakan (1987), Raavanan (2010), and OK Kanmani (2015). Over five demos were composed in place, before the sixth demo has been finalized for the song. The songs were mixed and mastered by Eric Pillai.

== Release ==
The music rights were acquired by Saregama. On the occasion of Deverakonda's birthday (9 May 2023), the makers unveiled the first single "Na Roja Nuvve" (in Telugu), "En Roja Neeye" (in Tamil and Malayalam), "Nanna Roja Neene" (in Kannada) and "Tu Meri Roja" (in Hindi). The second single, "Aaradhya" was released on 12 July, followed by the title track which released as the third single from the album on 28 July. A musical concert was held on 15 August, coinciding with India's Independence Day, at the HICC Conventional Centre in Hyderabad. Besides the cast and crew's attendance, the concert featured musical performances from Wahab, Sid Sriram, Javed Ali, Anurag Kulkarni, Haricharan, Chinmayi Sripada, K. S. Harisankar, Padmaja Sreenivasan, Divya S. Menon and Bhavana Isvi. The same day, the soundtrack was made available to streaming platforms in all languages.

== Reception ==
Janani K. of India Today wrote "If 'Kushi' is breezy and feel-good, the main credit should go to Hesham Abdul Wahab's soul-stirring music." Meera Venugopal of Radio Mirchi summarized "Hesham Abdul Wahab beautifully weaves songs into the larger narrative". Ram Venkat Srikar of Film Companion South wrote that Wahab's music "neatly complement Shiva Nirvana in keeping the mood pleasant and cheerful". Neeshita Nyayapati of The Times of India wrote "Hesham Abdul Wahab's music gels beautifully with the film." Saibal Chatterjee of NDTV described the music as one of the strongest points.

== Track listing ==
=== Telugu ===
All lyrics are written by Shiva Nirvana.

Kushi (Original Motion Picture Soundtrack) Telugu version track listing
No.	Title	Singer(s)	Length
1.	"Na Roja Nuvve"	Hesham Abdul Wahab	4:03
2.	"Yedhaki Oka Gaayam"	Hesham Abdul Wahab, Divya S. Menon	3:51
3.	"Kushi Title Song"	Hesham Abdul Wahab	3:33
4.	"Aradhya"	Sid Sriram, Chinmayi Sripada	4:44
5.	"Osi Pellama"	Rahul Sipligunj, Saketh Komanduri	3:39
Total length:			19:50

=== Tamil ===
All lyrics are written by Madhan Karky.

Kushi (Original Motion Picture Soundtrack) Tamil version track listing
No.	Title	Singer(s)	Length
1.	"En Roja Neeye"	Hesham Abdul Wahab	4:03
2.	"Vizhi Edhiril Thaeyum"	Haricharan, Padmaja Sreenivasan	3:51
3.	"Kushi Title Song"	Anurag Kulkarni	3:33
4.	"Aradhya"	Sid Sriram, Chinmayi Sripada	4:44
5.	"En Ponnamma"	Vijay Prakash	3:39
Total length:			19:50

=== Malayalam ===
All lyrics are written by Arun Alat.

Kushi (Original Motion Picture Soundtrack) Malayalam version track listing
No.	Title	Singer(s)	Length
1.	"En Roja Neeye"	Hesham Abdul Wahab	4:03
2.	"Vijanamoru Theeram"	K. S. Harisankar, Divya S. Menon	3:51
3.	"Kushi Title Song"	Anurag Kulkarni	3:33
4.	"Aradhya"	K. S. Harisankar, Shweta Mohan	4:44
5.	"Oru Pennithaa"	Anwar Sadath, Vipin Xavier	3:39
Total length:			19:50

=== Kannada ===
All lyrics are written by V. Nagendra Prasad.

Kushi (Original Motion Picture Soundtrack) Kannada version track listing
No.	Title	Singer(s)	Length
1.	"Nanna Roja Neene"	Hesham Abdul Wahab	4:03
2.	"Hrudayavidu Maounaa"	Haricharan, Bhavana Isvi	3:51
3.	"Kushi Title Song"	Anurag Kulkarni	3:33
4.	"Aradhya"	Haricharan, Chinmayi Sripada	4:44
5.	"He..Hendati"	Vijay Prakash	3:39
Total length:			19:50

=== Hindi ===
All lyrics are written by Raqueeb Alam.

Kushi (Original Motion Picture Soundtrack) Hindi version track listing
No.	Title	Singer(s)	Length
1.	"Tu Meri Roja"	Javed Ali	4:03
2.	"Sabr-E-Dil Toote"	Vishal Mishra, Gayatri Asokan	3:51
3.	"Kushi Title Song"	Hesham Abdul Wahab	3:33
4.	"Aradhya"	Jubin Nautiyal, Palak Muchhal	4:44
5.	"Meri Jaane Man"	Nakash Aziz	3:39
Total length:			19:50

== Accolades ==
Accolades for Kushi (Original Motion Picture Soundtrack)
Award (Note: Awards, festivals and organizations are in alphabetical order.)	Date of ceremony (Note: Date is linked to the article about the awards held that year, wherever possible.)	Category	Recipient(s)	Result	Ref.
Filmfare Awards South	3 August 2024	Best Music Director – Telugu	Hesham Abdul Wahab	Nominated	
Filmfare Awards South	3 August 2024	Best Male Playback Singer – Telugu	Hesham Abdul Wahab ("Kushi Title Song")	Nominated	
Filmfare Awards South	3 August 2024	Best Female Playback Singer – Telugu	Chinmayi Sripada ("Aradhya")	Nominated	
IIFA Utsavam	27 September 2024	Best Music Director – Telugu	Hesham Abdul Wahab	Nominated	
IIFA Utsavam	27 September 2024	Best Lyricist – Telugu	Shiva Nirvana ("Kushi Title Song")	Nominated	
IIFA Utsavam	27 September 2024	Best Male Playback Singer – Telugu	Sid Sriram ("Aradhya")	Nominated	
IIFA Utsavam	27 September 2024	Best Female Playback Singer – Telugu	Chinmayi Sripada ("Aradhya")	Nominated	
South Indian International Movie Awards	14 September 2024	Best Music Director – Telugu	Hesham Abdul Wahab (Note: also for Hi Nanna)	Won	
South Indian International Movie Awards	14 September 2024	Best Male Playback Singer – Telugu	Sid Sriram ("Aradhya")	Nominated	
