= Phanindra Narsetti =

Indian film director and screenwriter

- Born: Andhra Pradesh, India
- Education: Bachelor of Pharmacy
- Occupations: Film director; screenwriter; film editor
- Years active: 2012 to present
- Known for: Manu (2018); 8 Vasantalu (2025)

Phanindra Narsetti is an Indian film director, screenwriter and editor who works in Telugu cinema. He first gained attention for his short films, including Backspace (2012) and Madhuram, before making his feature film debut with the crowdfunded Manu (2018). His second feature, 8 Vasantalu (2025), was produced by Mythri Movie Makers.

== Early life and education ==
Narsetti holds a Bachelor of Pharmacy degree. He has said that films were central to his life from a young age and that he laid the groundwork for his filmmaking career while still in college.

== Career ==
=== Short films ===
Narsetti began his career making short films. His 2012 short Backspace drew attention because it was shot, edited and dubbed entirely on an iPhone 4S. His short film Madhuram became one of the more widely viewed Telugu short films on YouTube, reaching close to three million views. He also directed the short film Her, starring Regina Cassandra, which was widely shared online.

=== Feature films ===
Narsetti made his feature debut with Manu, which he wrote, directed and edited. The film was financed through crowdfunding, and its production banner was named "The Crowd" in recognition of its backers. It starred Raja Goutham and Chandini Chowdary, and was released on 7 September 2018. Goutham reportedly agreed to the project after watching Narsetti's short films Madhuram and Backspace. Critics praised the film's visuals and background score but found fault with its storytelling.

In February 2024, Mythri Movie Makers announced 8 Vasantalu (Eight Springs), a coming of age romantic drama written and directed by Narsetti that follows a young woman's life over eight years. Starring Ananthika Sanilkumar, with music by Hesham Abdul Wahab, the film was released theatrically on 20 June 2025 and later streamed on Netflix. Reviewers commended its cinematography and lead performance, while some criticised its heavily poetic dialogue and second half.

== Filmography ==
=== Feature films ===
Year	Title	Director	Writer	Editor	Notes
2018	Manu	Yes	Yes	Yes	Debut feature; crowdfunded
2025	8 Vasantalu	Yes	Yes	No	Produced by Mythri Movie Makers

=== Short films ===
Year	Title	Notes
2012	Backspace	Shot entirely on an iPhone 4S
	Madhuram	
	Her	Starring Regina Cassandra
