= Hi Nanna (soundtrack) =

2023 soundtrack album by Hesham Abdul Wahab

Soundtrack album by Hesham Abdul Wahab
- Released: 18 December 2023
- Recorded: 2023
- Studios: HW Studio, Kochi; Jubilee10 Studios, Hyderabad; Soundtown Studios, Chennai; YRF Studios, Mumbai
- Genre: Film soundtrack
- Length: 31:32
- Language: Telugu
- Label: T-Series
- Producer: Hesham Abdul Wahab

Hesham Abdul Wahab chronology
Philip's (2023)	Hi Nanna (2023)	Once Upon a Time in Kochi (2024)

Singles from Hi Nanna
- 1. "Samayama" Released: 8 September 2023; 2. "Gaaju Bomma" Released: 6 October 2023; 3. "Ammadi" Released: 28 October 2023; 4. "Odiyamma" Released: 30 November 2023; 5. "Idhe Idhe" Released: 6 December 2023

Hi Nanna is the soundtrack to the 2023 Indian Telugu-language film of the same name directed by Shouryuv and starring Nani and Mrunal Thakur. The film is scored by Hesham Abdul Wahab and the soundtrack features 10 songs with lyrics written by Anantha Sriram and Krishna Kanth. The soundtrack was released by T-Series on 18 December 2023. It is notably the first India film to re-record the background music through artificial intelligence.

== Development ==
Hi Nanna is Wahab's third Telugu film after Kushi and Spark L.I.F.E (both 2023). He described it as an "imperative" process scoring the film which reflects the tranquility of the visuals and production design and has composed music for the background at situations where the story demands it. The music had been recorded at his home studio in Kochi and other recording studios in Hyderabad, Chennai and Mumbai.

Wahab arranged the entire compositions through a single word, when it comes to non-Malayalam films. He asked the lyricist Krishna Kanth for finding the colloquial words used to address loved ones in the domestic native language, and after he came with the word "Ammadi" he composed the entire song. He went with both traditional and non-traditional ways of composing, with for few songs including "Gaaju Bomma" were composed in a pallavi—charanam format.

Upon the song "Samayama" released, it was compared with Wahab's own Malayalam song "Darshana" from Hridayam (2022) to which he claimed that only the first note of the song was similar to that, but he did not rehash the tunes as he was very particular on giving something fresh to audience. The track "Odiyamma" was conceptualized with the intention to subdue the emotional tonality. It was sung by actor Dhruv Vikram in his Telugu debut, who agreed to Shouryuv's suggestion on him crooning vocals for that song and went to Hyderabad in person to record it which he did in 2–3 days.

Wahab incorporated artificial intelligence for re-recording the film's score, thereby becoming the first in India to do so.

== Release ==
Hi Nanna's soundtrack preceded with the first single "Samayama" sung by Anurag Kulkarni and Sithara Krishnakumar, being released on 8 September 2023. The second single "Gaaju Bomma", performed by Wahab, was released on 6 October. The third song "Ammadi", which was sung by Shakthisree Gopalan and Kaala Bhairava, was released on 28 October 2023. The fourth song "Odiyamma" was released on 30 November, it was sung by Dhruv, with Shruti Haasan (who also made a cameo appearance) and Chinmayi Sripaada. It was preceded with a launch event at Vardhaman College of Engineering (Note: Dr. Vijender Reddy Teegala, one of the film's producers through Vyra Entertainments, is also the chairman of the college. The significant portions of the song were shot at the venue.) in the presence of Nani and Wahab. The fifth and final single from the album "Idhe Idhe" was released on 6 December. The full album consisting of 10 songs were released on 18 December 2023.

== Track listing ==
=== Telugu ===
No.	Title	Lyrics	Singer(s)	Length
1.	"Gaaju Bomma"	Anantha Sriram	Hesham Abdul Wahab	4:25
2.	"Samayama"	Anantha Sriram	Anurag Kulkarni, Sithara Krishnakumar	3:24
3.	"Asalelaa"	Anantha Sriram	Shakthisree Gopalan, Anurag Kulkarni	1:04
4.	"Ammaadi"	Krishna Kanth	Kaala Bhairava, Shakthisree Gopalan	3:39
5.	"Enno Enno"	Anantha Sriram	Bhavana Isvi	1:06
6.	"Adigaa"	Krishna Kanth	Karthik	3:30
7.	"Idhe Idhe"	Krishna Kanth	Hesham Abdul Wahab	3:35
8.	"Odiyamma"	Anantha Sriram	Dhruv Vikram, Shruti Haasan, Chinmayi Sripaada	3:15
9.	"Chedhu Nijam"	Krishna Kanth	Geetha Madhuri, Vineeth Sreenivasan	4:17
10.	"Needhe Needhe"	Krishna Kanth	Aavani Malhar	3:15
Total length:				31:32

=== Tamil ===
No.	Title	Lyrics	Singer(s)	Length
1.	"Kannaadi Kannaadi"	Madhan Karky	Hesham Abdul Wahab	4:25
2.	"Nizhaliyae"	Madhan Karky	Anurag Kulkarni, Chinmayi Sripaada	3:24
3.	"Nyamaliye"	Madhan Karky	Chinmayi Sripaada, Anurag Kulkarni	1:04
4.	"Maiyal"	Madhan Karky	Kaala Bhairava, Shakthisree Gopalan	3:39
5.	"Vaanam Pookkal"	Madhan Karky	Bhavana Isvi	1:06
6.	"Amizhdhe Nee"	Vivek	Karthik	3:30
7.	"Anbe Anbe"	Madhan Karky	Hesham Abdul Wahab	3:35
8.	"Odiyamma"	Vivek	Dhruv Vikram, Shruti Haasan, Chinmayi Sripaada	3:15
9.	"Nee Maaya Nizhal"	Vivek	Bhadra Rajin, Vineeth Sreenivasan	4:17
10.	"Vaazhvin Doorame"	Vivek	Aavani Malhar	3:15
Total length:				31:32

=== Kannada ===
All lyrics are written by Kaviraj.

No.	Title	Singer(s)	Length
1.	"Magalalla"	Hesham Abdul Wahab	4:25
2.	"Vivarane"	Anurag Kulkarni, Sithara Krishnakumar	3:24
3.	"Geleyane"	Anurag Kulkarni, Sithara Krishnakumar	1:04
4.	"Andhaaju"	Kaala Bhairava, Aavani Malhar	3:39
5.	"Jodi Thaare"	Bhavana Isvi	1:06
6.	"Allondhu"	Nasim	3:30
7.	"Idhe Idhe"	Hesham Abdul Wahab	3:35
8.	"Odiyamma"	Yazin Nizar, Chinmayi Sripaada, Vishnupriya Ravi	3:15
9.	"Ee Jeevavane"	Bhadra Rajin, Vineeth Sreenivasan	4:17
10.	"Manase Aalisu"	Aavani Malhar	3:15
Total length:			31:32

=== Malayalam ===
No.	Title	Lyrics	Singer(s)	Length
1.	"Konjathe Konjathe"	Kaithapram Damodaran Namboothiri	Hesham Abdul Wahab	4:25
2.	"Hridayame"	Arun Alat	Anurag Kulkarni, Sithara Krishnakumar	3:24
3.	"Vaaname"	Arun Alat	Anurag Kulkarni, Sithara Krishnakumar	1:04
4.	"Melle Ishtam"	Arun Alat	Aavani Malhar, Hesham Abdul Wahab	3:39
5.	"Mele Mevum"	Arun Alat	Aruna Mary George	1:06
6.	"Ithale Nee"	Arun Alat	Nazim	3:30
7.	"Penne Penne"	Arun Alat	Hesham Abdul Wahab	3:35
8.	"Odiyamma"	Arun Alat	Yazin Nizar, Divya S. Menon, Chinmayi Sripaada	3:15
9.	"Raathaarakaye"	B. K. Harinarayanan	Bhadra Rajin, Vineeth Sreenivasan	4:17
10.	"Theeraa Mohame"	Arun Alat	Aavani Malhar	3:15
Total length:				31:32

=== Hindi ===
No.	Title	Lyrics	Singer(s)	Length
1.	"Sheeshe Ki Gudiya"	Kausar Munir	Hesham Abdul Wahab	4:25
2.	"Saaya Tera"	Kausar Munir	Anurag Kulkarni, Chinmayi Sripaada	3:24
3.	"Sun Liya"	Kausar Munir	Chinmayi Sripaada, Anurag Kulkarni	1:04
4.	"Pyara Laage"	Kausar Munir	Hesham Abdul Wahab, Shakthisree Gopalan	3:39
5.	"Itni Itni"	Kausar Munir	Bhavana Isvi	1:06
6.	"Aye Khuda"	Kausar Munir	Karthik	3:30
7.	"Pehla Pehla"	Kausar Munir	Hesham Abdul Wahab	3:35
8.	"Odiyamma"	Kausar Munir	Nakash Aziz, Vishnupriya Ravi, Chinmayi Sripaada	3:15
9.	"Na Bhoola Tujhe"	Kausar Munir	Geetha Madhuri, Vineeth Srinivasan	4:17
10.	"Mann Mein Jo"	Kausar Munir	Aavani Malhar	3:15
Total length:				31:32

== Background Score ==
Hi Nanna

Film score by Hesham Abdul Wahab
- Released: 13 January 2024
- Recorded: 2023
- Studios: Soundtown Studios, Chennai
- Genre: Film score
- Length: 37:19(Side-A); 31:34(Side-B)
- Language: Telugu
- Label: T-Series
- Producer: Hesham Abdul Wahab

Hesham Abdul Wahab chronology
Philip's (2023)	Hi Nanna (2024)	Once Upon a Time in Kochi (2024)

The Score Composed, Arranged & Programmed by Hesham Abdul Wahab.

Hi Nanna Ost'S Side-A
No.	Title	Length
1.	"Life Of Viraj"	0:28
2.	"Mahi"	0:46
3.	"A Boy Called Varun"	0:45
4.	"Ante Nenu"	0:25
5.	"Mother Promise"	1:57
6.	"Viraj'S Theme"	1:26
7.	"Mahi'S Disappointment"	0:40
8.	"Cotton Candy"	1:09
9.	"Yashna My Friend"	1:06
10.	"Love In Coonoor"	1:14
11.	"The Portfolio"	0:27
12.	"Mana Katha"	0:48
13.	"Justin'S Fear"	0:27
14.	"Silence Of The Ears"	0:54
15.	"Love Or Friendship"	1:25
16.	"Cotton Candy And Cappuccino"	0:46
17.	"Silent Conversations"	0:57
18.	"Amma Paata"	0:47
19.	"Silence Of The Ears 2"	1:14
20.	"Badhyatha"	0:48
21.	"Dheeni Premantara"	1:50
22.	"How Far Is Coonoor"	2:00
23.	"Time And Distance"	1:15
24.	"Who'S Nose"	2:06
25.	"Let'S Get Pregnant"	1:17
26.	"It Doesn'T Add Up"	1:27
27.	"Mahi's Condition"	0:41
28.	"Let's Go Home, Nanna"	1:14
29.	"Shards Of Dreams {Vocals by A.I. Linda (A.I. Female voice) and Hesham Abdul Wahab}"	7:00
Total length:		37:19

Hi Nanna Ost'S Side-B
No.	Title	Length
1.	"Bougainvillea"	1:17
2.	"65 Roses"	0:52
3.	"Yashna And Her Daughter"	0:25
4.	"Saturday, Holiday"	0:40
5.	"Enroute Goa (Voice by Asura)"	1:42
6.	"Mahi'S Birthday"	1:36
7.	"Yashna'S Sister"	0:38
8.	"Yashna, Mahi And Beach"	0:27
9.	"Sea Of Memories"	1:24
10.	"Buttu, Juttu, Mukku Pudaka (Voice by Anurag Kulkarni)"	1:33
11.	"Bioluminescence"	0:49
12.	"Drunk Banter"	0:31
13.	"Hi"	0:33
14.	"Family Of Four"	1:32
15.	"Do You Like Me"	1:07
16.	"Yashna! Yashna! Yashna!"	2:04
17.	"Missing Mahi"	1:50
18.	"Justin And The Grandmother"	1:26
19.	"A Love Like Mine"	1:36
20.	"Expectations"	0:44
21.	"Estranged Mother"	0:43
22.	"Yashna And Her Father"	1:23
23.	"The Wedding"	1:21
24.	"My Son In Law"	2:04
25.	"Full Circle"	1:19
26.	"And She Lives"	1:58
Total length:		31:34

== Reception ==
Sangeetha Devi Dundoo of The Hindu wrote "Music composer Hesham Abdul Wahab is a big asset to the film. The songs are hummable and pleasant, but the background score takes the cake. When the strains of 'Idhe idhe tholisaarila…' play at different points, it is impossible not to be moved. He also uses the calming notes of the waves and silences where essential." Raghu Bandi of The Indian Express wrote "Hesham’s music, reminiscent of Kushi tracks, helps the movie immensely." Critic based at123Telugu wrote "Hesham Abdul Wahab’s songs and background score are wonderful. The only downside is the Odiyamma song, which wasn’t absolutely necessary."

Neeshita Nyayapati of Hindustan Times wrote "The songs might not stay with you, in the sense that you want to listen to them over and over again, but they fit in well with the narrative and sometimes, even add to the scenes." Ram Venkat Srikar of Film Companion described it as a "soothing and evocative soundtrack". Janani K. of India Today felt that Wahab shoulders the film, saying "the songs and the background score elevated the film to a greater extent".
