= Little Hearts =

Little Hearts may refer to:

- Little Hearts (2024 film), a 2024 Indian Malayalam-language film
- Little Hearts (2025 film), a 2025 Indian Telugu-language film
