= Once More (soundtrack) =

2026 film soundtrack album

Soundtrack album by Hesham Abdul Wahab
- Released: 20 August 2026
- Recorded: September 2024–July 2026
- Studios: Aural Alchemy Productions, Chennai; SoundTown Studio, Chennai; OffBeat Studio, Chennai; MLouge Studio, Cochin; HW Studio, Cochin; SoundsRight Studio, Chennai
- Genre: Feature film soundtrack
- Length: 37:31
- Language: Tamil
- Label: Think Music
- Producer: Hesham Abdul Wahab

Hesham Abdul Wahab chronology
Madhuvidhu (2026)	Once More (2026)	Epic (2026)

Singles from Once More
- 1. "Miss Oruthi" Released: 24 October 2024; 2. "Idhayam" Released: 16 November 2024; 3. "Vaa Kannamma" Released: 10 January 2025; 4. "Edhira? Pudhira?" Released: 28 March 2025; 5. "Meenduma?" Released: 19 July 2025; 6. "Indra" Released: 3 April 2026; 7. "Badhil Sol" Released: 12 August 2026

Once More is the soundtrack album composed by Hesham Abdul Wahab to the 2026 Tamil-language romantic musical film of the same name directed by Vignesh Srikanth in his directorial debut, starring Arjun Das and Aditi Shankar. The album accompanies 13 tracks with lyrics written by Srikanth and Arun Alat. Led by seven singles, the album was released through Think Music on 20 August 2026.

== Background ==
Once More was initially intended to be the Tamil debut of composer Hesham Abdul Wahab, and was the first Tamil project he signed. However, the prolonged delay of the project led to this film being his fourth Tamil venture, after Maaman (2025), Lucky the Superstar and Made in Korea (both 2026). Initially, Hesham had confusions with the script but felt reassured after discussing the themes of the film, primarily narrowing on human emotions and relationships, with his wife Aisha. Hesham worked with Srikanth along with the lead actors as a collaborative effort on the production. Both the lead actors, Arjun and Aditi, considered the film's music as its soul, adding that Hesham's name came in his mind when Srikanth deciphered it as a "musical love story" and that his music would suit the themes of the film. Aditi said that Hesham had given importance to melodies and soulful numbers, influenced by the works of Harris Jayaraj and A. R. Rahman.

== Production ==
Once More accompanied around 13 songs, all of them written by Srikanth himself. Hesham denoted that he never expected a long album, as he had went with the composition of numerous songs as influenced by the script. Hesham was also conscious on the choice of singers, such as Aditi Shankar for "Anname" which had minimal piano arrangements and underlying vocals, Naresh Iyer providing vocals for "Miss Oruthi" owing to a nostalgic experience, Vineeth Sreenivasan singing "Idhayam", which Hesham was firm on including him to the soundtrack and added that he recorded the song despite his busy shooting schedule, along with a variety of singers including Hesham himself. Chinmayi had recorded one song, as well as dubbing for the film, but it did not get included in the final soundtrack.

Hesham added that Srikanth brought out of the spirit of his music in Hridayam (2022) and Hi Nanna (2023) while composing the songs "Vaa Kannamma" and "Idhayam" and prompted that to create much that personally connects with the listeners in an emotional spectrum, while revealing a deep realization about himself as a composer. Srikanth and Hesham conversed back and forth on their likes and interests on specific music and that helped in designing the album. Hesham also added that the score also plays a role in the narrative, where he had composed the score after watching the complete film to emphasize with the characters and situations.

== Release ==
The first single "Miss Oruthi" was released on 24 October 2024, followed by the second single "Idhayam" which released on 16 November. The third single "Vaa Kannamma" was released on 10 January 2025, followed by the fourth single "Edhira Pudhira" on 28 March, and the fifth single "Meenduma?" on 19 July. The sixth single "Indra" was released on 3 April 2026, and "Badhil Sol", a poetry, was released as the seventh single on 12 August.

An event titled Once More Music Carnival was held at the Sri Manakula Vinayagar Engineering College in Nallathur, Pondicherry, on 20 August 2026, with the cast and crew in attendance; the event saw the live performance of the film's songs by the composer and the singers. The full album was released on the same date.

== Track listing ==
All lyrics are written by Vignesh Srikanth, except where noted.

No.	Title	Singer(s)	Length
1.	"Oru Poomugam"	Aditya Ravindran	1:52
2.	"Edhira? Pudhira?"	Sathyaprakash, Aavani Malhar	2:20
3.	"Idhayam"	Vineeth Sreenivasan	3:48
4.	"Vaa Kannamma"	Hesham Abdul Wahab, Uthara Unnikrishnan	4:44
5.	"Meenduma?"	Aavani Malhar	2:34
6.	"Miss Oruthi"	Naresh Iyer	4:32
7.	"Indra" (Malayalam lyrics by Arun Alat)	Hanan Shaah	3:24
8.	"Sindhippaayo?"	Anila Rajeev	1:17
9.	"Andhi Nilavu"	Hesham Abdul Wahab	2:28
10.	"Kanne Kanne"	Arjun KC	3:34
11.	"Anname"	Aditi Shankar	2:04
12.	"Saki"	Ananthu	3:25
13.	"Badhil Sol"	Hesham Abdul Wahab, Anila Rajeev, Arjun Das	1:26
Total length:			37:31

== Reception ==
M Suganth of The Times of India added that Hesham's "bright score keeps the feel-good factor high". Janani K of India Today wrote Hesham's music as one of the biggest strengths, adding "Hesham's songs, particularly Vaa Kannamma and Idhayam, along with the background score, stay with you even after you leave the theatre." Srinivasa Ramanujam of The Hindu described it as an "exciting soundtrack, which includes a variety of genres to choose from." Bhawana Sharma of Moneycontrol wrote "Music plays a big part in Once More and Hesham Abdul Wahab’s score suits the romantic vibe of the film quite well. The songs spill into the narrative rather than interrupting it. The background score also gives emotional heft to a number of crucial moments."

== Personnel ==
Credits adapted from Think Music:

- Music composer, arranger and producer: Hesham Abdul Wahab
- Music coordinator: KD Vincent, Vichuuuh, Praboa
- Studios: HW Studio, Cochin; Sounds Right Studios, Chennai; MLounge Studio, Cochin; Offbeat Studios, Chennai; K7 Studio, Cochin; Aural Alchemy Productions, Chennai
- Recording: Hesham Abdul Wahab, Vichuuuh, Praboa, Ashwin George John, Hariharan A, Midhun Manoj, Shyamaprasad, Ashwin Krishna, Aswin Kumar, Harishankar V
- Mixing: Harishankar V, Santom Jose, Nived Krishnan, Azhar Thaju, Aswin George John
- Mastering: Harishankar V, Aswin George John
- Studio manager: Vichuuuh, Atul Prabhu, Kishor Chokappan

Musicians

- Guitars: Sumesh Parameshwar
- Nylon string guitar: Sumesh Parameshwar
- Bass: Sumesh Parameshwar, Naveen Napier
- Violin: Francis Xavier
- Saxophone: Josy
- Keys: Arish Ani, Hesham Abdul Wahab
- Synths: Hesham Abdul Wahab
- Rhythm: Kalyan Ram
- Percussions: Sruthiraj
- Veena: Punya Srinivas
- Nadaswaram: Guna Balasubrahmaniam
- Melodyne: PG Ragesh
- Choir: Aruna Mary George, Ajmal Fathima, Aliya Azim, Gayatry Rajeev, Madhumita, Fathima Henna, Vani, Milan Joy, Bharat Sajikumar, Amal C Ajith, Angel Mary Joseph, Anna Maerin Easo, Dr.Malavika, Zia and Dhana
- Acapella: Elfe Choir
- Cochin Strings arrangement and production: Vyshak Bejoy
- Chennai Strings Orchestra: Murali, Mohan Rao, Girijan, Sasi and Chandrasekhar
- Chennai Strings conductor: Chandrasekhar
