= Njan Prakashan =

2018 film directed by Sathyan Anthikad

- Theatrical release poster
- Directed by: Sathyan Anthikad
- Written by: Sreenivasan
- Produced by: Sethu Mannarkad
- Starring: Fahadh Faasil; Anju Kurian; Sreenivasan; Nikhila Vimal; Devika Sanjay
- Cinematography: S. Kumar
- Edited by: K. Rajagopal
- Music by: Shaan Rahman
- Production company: Full Moon Cinema
- Distributed by: Kalasangham Films; Evergreen Films
- Release date: 21 December 2018
- Running time: 131 minutes
- Country: India
- Language: Malayalam
- Box office: est. ₹52 crore

Njan Prakashan (transl. I am Prakashan) is a 2018 Indian Malayalam-language satirical comedy film directed by Sathyan Anthikad and written by Sreenivasan. It stars Fahadh Faasil in the title role. Sethu Mannarkkad produced the film under the banner of Full Moon Cinema.

The film was released on 21 December 2018 to positive reviews. At the box office, it grossed ₹52 crore worldwide in 40 days into release, becoming one of the highest-grossing Malayalam films of all time.

== Plot ==
The story of a man named Prakashan who yearns to go to foreign countries, particularly Germany. He finds that his name is a bit old-fashioned so changes his name to P. R. Akash just to sound more modern. Though qualified as a nurse, he vehemently opposes the idea of entering the nursing profession because of its lower pay and thankless nature. He shows a sexist view toward this career, believing that it is suited to women rather than men. He actively tries to go abroad by marrying a foreign citizen and thus acquiring a family visa, followed by dumping her and living his life.

As a foundation for his plan, he tries his hand at rekindling an old flame with his ex-girlfriend Salomi despite the fact that she is a nurse. Salomi is on the verge of migrating to Germany for significantly higher wages. He digresses from his original plan to start fresh, and tries to re-ignite his unfulfilled love with Salomi, learns German and foresees Germany as his final destination.

He confides in his local guardian Gopalji, a former student of his father, that the affection showered on Salomi was a lie so that he could obtain a visa in conjunction with the existing emigration rules. However, when Prakashan visits them later, he discovers that they still require a significant amount of money for the visa. Though they were planning to mortgage their house, they need the signature of Salomi's aunt, who is practicing in Italy as a nun and will not return to Kerala. Consequently, he sells his motorbike and persuades Gopalji to steal a necklace from his wife, which gets Gopalji into trouble with the police. Ironically, Salomi cheats Prakashan along with her family and manages to use him for money to get to Germany. There, she marries a German citizen to remain in the country. Realizing that she exploited him and his family, Prakashan leaves his visa acquiring scam then and there and stays in Kerala.

He then works doing manual labor for Gopalji to repay his debt for the necklace, and later resorts to a related profession of a home nurse. He takes up the job with Tina Mol, the feisty daughter of a rich mother, who loves junk food. Though initially she sets her dog loose on him after he refused to let her friend Shruthi deliver a burger, they develop a remarkably close relationship. Prakashan also develops a romantic interest for Shruti. During a discussion where Tina expresses her desire to meet her father before dying, Prakashan tells her that she has her whole life ahead of her to do so. She then reveals to him that she is terminally ill with a malignant brain cyst, at which point she starts bleeding from the ear. After her family doctor treats her, Prakashan recounts a similar case in America where a terminally ill cancer patient was cured just by laughing and enjoying his life - he thus tries to improve her quality of life through inviting her schoolmates over, playing badminton with her and so on.

However, Tina unexpectedly dies during one of Prakashan's stories despite his efforts to revive her. This has a profound impact on him, with Prakashan transforming himself into a realistic and grounded human being, a sensitive nursing professional where he realizes that nursing is more than just a way of income, but rather, a way to help people in need.

== Cast ==
- Fahadh Faasil as Prakashan / P. R. Akash / Sylvester
- Sreenivasan as Gopalji
- Anju Kurian as Shruthi (voice dubbed by Raveena Ravi)
- Nikhila Vimal as Salomi Gregory
- Devika Sanjay as Teenamol
- K. P. A. C. Lalitha as Pauly Chechi
- Aneesh G Menon as Bahuleyan, Prakashan's friend
- Aparna Das as Bahuleyan's one-sided lover
- Sabitha Anand as Prakashan's mother
- Veena Nair as Usha, Prakashan's sister
- Jayashankar Karimuttam as Gregory, Salomi's father
- Remya Suresh as Salomi's mother
- Aishwarya S Menon as Celina, Salomi's sister
- Manjula as Prashanthan's wife
- Manjusha Sajish as Prakashan's sister-in-law
- Munshi Dileep as Prakashan's brother
- Sudhakaran as Prakashan's Brother-in-law
- M.G. Sasi as Doctor Varghese
- Sminu Sijo as Gopalji's wife
- Al Sabith as Gopalji's son
- Malavika Sivadas as Gopalji's daughter
- Meera Nair as Rachel
- Aniyappan as Drunkard

== Production ==
Sathyan Anthikkad is directing a film written by Sreenivasan after 16 years. Fahadh Faasil was selected for the leading role. Njan Prakashan was produced by Full Moon Cinema. Its filming began in mid-July 2018 and was wrapped up in early October. Anthikkad initially named the film Malayali and received approval from Kerala Film Chamber of Commerce, but was changed after knowing that there was already a Malayalam film with that name.

== Music ==
The film score was composed by Shaan Rahman, in his first collaboration with Sathyan Anthikad.

No.	Title	Singer(s)	Length
1.	"Omal Thamara"	Yadhu S. Marar
2.	"Athmavin Akashathil"	Shaan Rahman, Gowry Lekshmi
3.	"Badi Badi Bar"	Swathaki Banerji

== Release ==
The film was released on 21 December 2018.

=== Box office ===
The film grossed nearly ₹20 crore from Kerala box office with a distributor's share of ₹8.9 crore, as of 9 January 2019. In overseas, the film grossed $12,080 in Australia and $19,390 in New Zealand in the opening weekend (3 days). In three weekends, it grossed $23,302 and $29,177 in Australia and New Zealand, respectively. It grossed £26,772 from 28 sites in the United Kingdom in the opening weekend. In three weekends, it grossed £80,029 (₹73.63 lakh) in the UK. It grossed $81,484 (₹56.86 lakh) in the United States opening weekend. In six weekends, it grossed $272,945 (₹1.96 crore) in the US. With a total of $278,000, Njan Prakashan became the highest-grossing Malayalam film in the US, surpassing Pulimurugan ($258,000). The film earned a global theatrical revenue of ₹52 crore in 40 days, becoming one of the highest-grossing Malayalam films of all time. The film ran for 101 days in Kerala box office.

=== Critical response ===
Sajin Shrijith of The New Indian Express rated 4 in a scale of 5 and wrote: "Njan Prakashan is a laugh-out-loud comedy, and has more than enough to satisfy anyone looking for two hours of pure entertainment; but since this is a film about life, a couple of dark moments are to be expected ... Thankfully, Anthikad keeps the film free of old-fashioned melodrama". Anjana George of The Times of India rated 4 out of 5 stars and wrote: "As PR Akash transforms to Prakashan and realises the beauty of life and God's own country, we will definitely welcome back Sreenivasan and Sathyan Anthikad, whose films even after three decades manage to encapsulate the Malayali psyche". Anna M. M. Vetticad of Firstpost gave 4 out of 5 stars and said: "Njan Prakashan inhabits familiar Anthikad territory yet within the familiar, the director manages to unearth the refreshing and the new. It is hard to explain what the film is about because it is not about anything in particular, yet it is about anything that matters - life, death and the relationships that come in between".

S. R. Praveen of The Hindu wrote: "movie sticks faithfully to the Antikad – Sreenivasan playbook ... while Njan Prakashan might satisfy those who yearn for more of the same from the 90s' Sathyan-Sreeni world, it would be a disappointment for those looking for novelty". Sify's critic rated 2.5 in a scale of 5, writing "Njan Prakashan has a shaky first half but a relatively more convincing second half ... There are some laughs in the beginning but the comedy becomes predictable and the situations become less interesting ... Sreenivasan's script lacks the punch of some of his gems from the past and this one becomes a rehash of a few of Sathyan Anthikad's own earlier movies". Cris from The News Minute wrote: "All the characters are written superficially, without any depth or originality. It's like a series of skits put together ... the movie itself would have felt more real, and as adorable as it was meant to be, if it were fresher, deeper and not the kind we've seen a dozen times before."

== Accolades ==
South Indian International Movie Awards

- Best Director - Sathyan Antikad
