= Manu (film) =

Telugu film

- Film poster
- Directed by: Phanindra Narsetti
- Written by: Phanindra Narsetti
- Produced by: Srujan Yarabolu
- Starring: Raja Goutham; Chandini Chowdary
- Cinematography: Vishwanath Reddy Chelumalla
- Edited by: Phanindra Narsetti
- Music by: Naresh Kumaran
- Release date: 7 September 2018
- Running time: 180 minutes
- Country: India
- Language: Telugu

Manu is a 2018 Indian Telugu language experimental romantic art film directed by debutant Phanindra Narsetti. The film stars Raja Goutham and Chandini Chowdary. The film, banked on crowdfunding, released to average reviews. However, the film is praised for its unique story-telling, direction, production design, music, colour correction, costumes, but criticised the film's excessive length, unnecessary detailing.

== Plot ==
This story begins in the 1980s. At a bar Neela, an Anglo-Indian woman, meets Manu, a well-known muralist, and praises his artwork, but the conversation turns out to be a misunderstanding. Meanwhile, Ranga, who is in fear for his life, is unable to pay the huge debt earlier; he lost one of his kidneys to pay the amount. At the same time, three criminals, Amar, Akbar and Anthony, are waiting for a person to kill and decide to part their way after work. When Neela is about to leave, her bag falls down with a full bag of cash. Then Ranga notices this and follows her for the bag; later the criminal trio attacks on the person they are targeted for, and Manu comes to his rescue and bashes them blue and leaves the bar.

== Cast ==
- Raja Goutham as Manu
- Chandini Chowdary as Neela
- Aberaam Varma as Ranga
- Mohan Bhagat as Antony
- John Kottoly as Akbar
- Appaji Ambarisha Darbha as Rudraprathap
- Srikanth as Amar

== Production ==
Raja Goutham okayed the film after watching the Phanindra Narsetti's short films Madhuram and Backspace and listening to his script narration. Chandini Chowdary was cast to play the other lead role. The film was set in the 1980s and Chowdary played an English woman in the film. The film is a crowdfunded venture.

== Reception ==
A critic from The Hindu wrote that "If only it had been less indulgent, Manu would have been worthwhile". A critic from The Times of India gave the film two-and-a-half out of five stars and wrote that "Manu had all the ingredients to be a rewarding experience, though it falls short of being one". A critic from Deccan Chronicle gave the film two out of five stars and noted that "An interesting plot and good screenplay could have perhaps salvaged this film. While Manu starts off on a promising note, the director hasn’t been able to see it through till the end".
