= Spark Life =

- Theatrical Release Poster
- Directed by: Vikranth Reddy
- Written by: Vikranth Reddy
- Produced by: Leela Reddy
- Starring: Vikranth Reddy; Mehreen Pirzada; Rukshar Dhillon
- Cinematography: A. R. Ashok Kumar
- Edited by: Prawin Pudi
- Music by: Hesham Abdul Wahab
- Production company: Deaf Frog Productions
- Release date: 17 November 2023
- Running time: 170 minutes
- Country: India
- Language: Telugu

Spark Life is a 2023 Indian Telugu-language action thriller film written and directed by Vikranth Reddy. Produced under Deaf Frog Productions, it stars Reddy in the lead role alongside Mehreen Pirzada and Rukshar Dhillon. The music was composed by Hesham Abdul Wahab with cinematography by A. R. Ashok Kumar and editing by Prawin Pudi. The film was released on 17 November 2023 and was panned by critics.

== Plot ==
Jay's love for Ananya leads to a deadly chain of events while Lekha's dreams collide with a stranger named Arya. As suicide killings grip the nation, a sinister force entwines their lives.

== Cast ==
- Vikranth Reddy as Arya Jayadev
- Mehreen Pirzada as Lekha
- Rukshar Dhillon as Ananya
- Nassar as Major Bharadwaj
- Guru Somasundaram as Dr. Rudra
- Suhasini Maniratnam as Dr. Indira
- Vennela Kishore as Rama Brahmam
- Satya as Rakesh
- Brahmaji as Police Officer
- Srikanth Iyengar as Lekha's father
- Anish Kuruvilla as Army Chief
- Raja Ravindra as Ashok Reddy
- Mayank Parak as David
- Lahari Shari as Harshitha
- Ashu Reddy as Aradhana

== Production ==
In May 2022, it was announced that Mehreen Pirzada would star alongside Vikranth Reddy in Spark. In July 2022, Rukshar Dhillon joined the cast. Filming took place in Hyderabad, followed by Iceland before moving on to Munnar and Visakhapatnam.

== Music ==
The soundtrack was composed by Hesham Abdul Wahab in his second Telugu film after Kushi (2023). All lyrics were written by Anantha Sriram.

Spark

Soundtrack album by Hesham Abdul Wahab
- Released: November 21, 2023
- Genre: Feature film soundtrack
- Length: 17:08
- Language: Telugu
- Label: Aditya Music

Hesham Abdul Wahab chronology
Sesham Mike-il Fathima (2023)	Spark (2023)	Philip's (2023)

Official audio
- Spark - Full Album on YouTube

Track listing
No.	Title	Singer(s)	Length
1.	"Yema Andham"	Sid Sriram	02:25
2.	"Gnapakaalu"	Hesham Abdul Wahab, Krishna Lasya	03:51
3.	"Radhesha"	Shweta Mohan	03:17
4.	"Lekha Lekha"	Armaan Malik	03:14
5.	"Idhi Idhi Maaya"	Hesham Abdul Wahab, Shreya Ghoshal	04:21
Total length:			17:08

== Reception ==
Sunil Boddula of News18 wrote, "Overall, the film fails to impress, but can be a one-time watch." Zoom TV Entertainment gave 1.5/5 stars and wrote, "Spark L.I.F.E stands out as an overambitious project that bites off more than it can chew. The film's attempt to blend romance, action thriller, comedy, and crime saga results in a messy and confusing experience." Prakash Pecheti of The South First gave 1.5/5 stars and wrote, "Had it been handled by a senior filmmaker, Spark Life could have been a decent psychological crime thriller."Times Now gave 1.5/5 stars and wrote, "If you want to watch Tiger 3, Khichdi 2 and Sapta Sagaradaache Ello - Side B all in one, this is the film for you!"
