= Sukhamano Sukhamann =

2026 Indian Malayalam language film

- Directed by: Arunlal Ramachandran
- Written by: Arunlal Ramachandran
- Produced by: Gaurav Chanana
- Starring: Mathew Thomas; Devika Sanjay; Jagadish
- Cinematography: Tobin Thomas
- Edited by: Appu Bhattathiri
- Music by: Nipin Besent
- Production company: Lucifer Circus
- Distributed by: Dream Big Films (Kerala); Plot Pictures (overseas)
- Release date: 13 February 2026
- Country: India
- Language: Malayalam

Sukhamano Sukhamann (transl. Are you fine?; Yes I am) is a 2026 Indian Malayalam-language fantasy drama film written and directed by Arunlal Ramachandran in his directorial debut. The film stars Mathew Thomas, Devika Sanjay and Jagadish in lead roles. The film was released in theatres on 13 February 2026.

== Plot ==
Theo, who has no other relatives or close friends, is living alone at home after his grandfather's death. He is going through mental difficulties and is teased by the other children in the village as Mental. He had been working as a driver for a rich man but lost that job under certain circumstances. While searching for a job, he accidentally gets a job as an ambulance driver through Aip, an employee of the electric crematorium. After being mistaken for a relative at a stranger's funeral, he begins hallucinating the deceased man as his grandfather.

Subsequently, he finds himself surrounded by the deceased, and they become his family and friends. While searching for a departed young woman to be his romantic partner, Theo encounters Charu, who is living with the knowledge that her life is about to end soon. The film unfolds through the changes that Charu's arrival brings to Theo's life, alongside the gradual revelation of his own past.

== Development ==
The film was directed by debutant Arunlal Ramachandran and produced by Gaurav Chanana under the banner of Lucifer Circus, with Garima Vohra serving as co-producer. The cinematography is done by Tobin Thomas, editing by Appu Bhattathiri and the music is by Nipin Besent.

Dream Big Films distributed the film in Kerala, while Plot Pictures handled its overseas distribution and Lucifer Music acquired its audio rights.

According to Arunlal Ramachandran, who is also the writer, the film's premise was inspired by a passage in the writings of M. T. Vasudevan Nair about a young man visiting a funeral home. The story subsequently developed into that of a young man working at a crematorium who encounters imaginary people. The lead role was initially planned as a middle-aged man but was rewritten as a man in his early twenties after Mathew Thomas expressed interest in the project. The film was initially planned as the first production of Wayfarer Films, with Dulquer Salmaan as producer.

== Cast ==
- Mathew Thomas as Theo
- Devika Sanjay as Charu
- Jagadish as Iype
- Spadikam George as Vallyapachan
- Kudassanad Kanakam as Vallyammachi
- Noby Marcose as Unni Chettan
- Manikuttan as Sony
- Abin Bino as Rapper Parrotakkaran
- Akhil Kavalayoor as Tabalist Gopu

== Music ==
The film's first song, "Koode Koodaan", written by Manu Manjith, sung by Evugin and composed by Nipin Besant, was released on February 2, 2026. The love track titled Butterfly composed by Nipin Besent, written by Anwar Ali and sung by Gowry Lekshmi was released on 7 February, 2026.

== Release ==
The film which released in theatres on February 13, 2026 was started streaming on Amazon Prime Video OTT platform from May 29, 2026.

== Reception ==
Cinema Express's Vivek Santhosh praised the film's premise and performances but criticised its mechanical storytelling, disconnected scenes and failure to convey its themes of depression and isolation with sufficient emotional depth.

Giving a rating of 2/5, Aishwarya S. Nair of The Times of India writes that, even with such a unique premise, the scripting is very weak, and the movie lacks the emotional profundity it should have carried. Giving a rating of 0.5/5, Anandu Suresh of The Indian Express described the film as a pure torture.

This is a heartwarming film that changes the usual views of love, writes R. B. Sreelekha of ManoramaOnline.Princy Alexander of the Onmanorama praised the music by Nipin Besent and cinematography by Tobin Thomas. A review published by Asianet News describes the film as a family entertainer that blends dark humor with a feel-good emotional drama.

The then Kerala Education Minister V. Sivankutty praised the film, saying that it reminds us that the many lonelinesses experienced by humans can be changed through an open conversation or a loving look.
