= Little Hearts (2025 film) =

Indian Telugu-language romantic comedy film

- Theatrical release poster
- Directed by: Sai Marthand
- Written by: Sai Marthand
- Produced by: Aditya Hasan
- Starring: Mouli Tanuj Prasanth; Shivani Nagaram
- Cinematography: Suriya Balaji
- Edited by: Sreedhar Sompally
- Music by: Sinjith Yerramilli
- Production companies: ETV Win; Bairagi Kathalu
- Distributed by: Bunny Vas Works; Vamshi Nandipati Entertainments
- Release date: 5 September 2025
- Running time: 128 minutes
- Country: India
- Language: Telugu

Little Hearts is a 2025 Indian Telugu-language romantic comedy film written and directed by Sai Marthand, and produced by Aditya Hasan for ETV Win. The film features Mouli Tanuj Prasanth and Shivani Nagaram in the lead roles, alongside a supporting cast of Rajeev Kanakala, S. S. Kanchi, Jai Krishna and Nikhil Abburi.

Little Hearts was theatrically released on 5 September 2025 to positive reviews from critics and emerged as a blockbuster at the box office grossing over ₹40 crore against a budget of ₹2.4 crore.

== Plot ==
In 2015 Hyderabad, Nalli Akhil Kumar is a cheerful, easygoing Intermediate student whose life revolves around hanging out with his friends, eating Kachoris, and avoiding studies. His strict father, Gopal Rao, desperately wants him to clear EAMCET and become an IT engineer. However, Akhil fails the entrance test, prompting his girlfriend Sameera to break up with him and his father to enroll him in a long-term coaching institute.

At the coaching center, Akhil encounters Akula Kaathyayani, a reserved NEET aspirant who is under pressure from her physician parents, Krishankanth and Sangeetha, to crack the exam. Akhil immediately falls for her and tries various hilarious antics to catch her attention with the help of his friend, Madhu. Kaathyayani rejects his advances, revealing that she is three years older than him and taking long-term coaching for the fourth time. However, Akhil's feelings for her remain unchanged. He eventually wins her over with his humour and underlying sincerity, and they begin dating.

As their romance grows, the couple navigates typical struggles: bunking classes, dodging strict parents, managing third-wheel friends, and trying to balance their studies with love. With Kaathyayani's encouragement, Akhil decides to pursue a degree in journalism and convince his father. However, complications arise when Kaathyayani's parents discover her relationship with Akhil. They strictly restricts her freedom, cutting off communication between the two. Elsewhere, Akhil successfully persuades Gopal Rao to accept his career choice, while Kaathyayani convinces her parents to let her to study Biotechnology in Bangalore, reassuring that she will not contact Akhil.

However, the two begin a long-distance relationship, constantly communicating through WhatsApp video calls and maintaining their blissful romance. Eventually, both Akhil and Kaathyayani achieve success in their respective chosen careers. Realizing the wealth of each other's families, their parents cast aside their earlier objections and agree to the match. The film concludes with Akhil and Kaathyayani's engagement ceremony, while Akhil's younger brother, Nikhil, flirts with Kaathyayani's younger sister, Neelambari.

== Cast ==
- Mouli Tanuj Prasanth as Nalli Akhil Kumar
- Shivani Nagaram as Akula Kaathyayani
- Rajeev Kanakala as Nalli Gopal Rao, Akhil and Nikhil's father
- S. S. Kanchi as Akula Krishnakanth, Khathyayani and Neelambari's father
- Satya Krishnan as Akula Sangeetha, Khathyayini and Neelambari's mother
- Raja Prajwal as Nalli Nikhil Kumar, Akhil's younger brother
  - Sai Marthand as the older Nalli Nikhil Kumar
- Jai Krishna as Madhu, Akhil's friend
- Nikhil Abburi as Aashish, Akhil's friend
- Padmini Settam as Anjali, Khathyayani's friend
- Harinath Raj as Kishore, Khathyayani's cousin
- Anitha Chowdary as Nalli Srilatha, Akhil and Nikhil's mother
- Madiha Nasreen as Akula Neelambari, Khathyayani's younger sister
  - Dheera Reddy Pisati as the older Akula Neelambari
- Mahesh Chintala as Koti sir
- Shailaja Durvasula as Sameera Krishnan, Akhil's ex-girlfriend

== Music ==
The songs and background score for the film were composed by Sinjith Yerramilli. The audio rights were acquired by Aditya Music. The first single "Rajagadiki" was released on 7 August 2025. The second single "Chaduvu Ledu" was released on 27 August 2025.

Track listing
No.	Title	Lyrics	Singer(s)	Length
1.	"Rajagadiki"	Kittu Vissapragada	Sanjith Hegde	3:48
2.	"Chaduvu Ledu"	Swaroop Goli	Jassie Gift	3:46
3.	"Hello Ani"	Kittu Vissapragada	Anurag Kulkarni	3:46

== Release ==
Little Hearts was supposed to be released directly on ETV Win but was released in movie theatres on 5 September 2025. It was released on ETV Win on 1 October 2025.

== Reception ==
Srivathsan Nadadhur of The Hindu opined that "costumes, production design, and cinematography" has enriched the visual appeal and praised the writing. Echoing the same, Swaroop Kodur of The Indian Express rated the film 3.5 out of 5 and appreciated the performances of Mouli, Shivani and the supporting cast; "Sreedhar Sompally’s editing must receive a mention as well, for how it navigates the plot without making it seem chaotic at any point", he added. Calling it "breezy and nostalgic", Paul Nicodemus of The Times of India too gave the same rating and commented, "a fine example of how the right story, told well, can make you smile all through".
