= SIIMA Award for Best Music Director – Telugu =

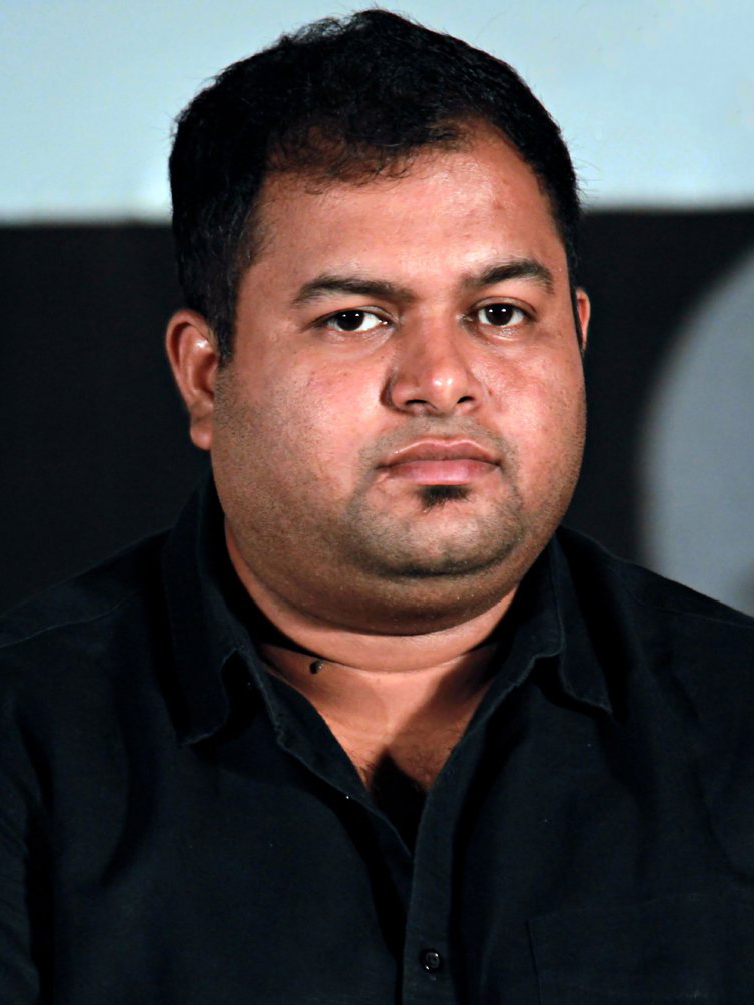
- The 2026 recipient: Thaman S
- Awarded for: Best Music Direction/Composition in Telugu cinema
- Country: India
- Presented by: Vibri Media Group
- First award: 21 June 2012 (for films released in 2011)
- Most recent winner: Thaman S, They Call Him OG (2025)

Highlights
- Most wins: Devi Sri Prasad (8)
- Most nominations: Devi Sri Prasad (17)

SIIMA Award for Best Music Director – Telugu is presented by Vibri media group as part of its annual South Indian International Movie Awards, for best music director / composer in Telugu films. The award was first given in 2012 for songs and music albums released in 2011. Devi Sri Prasad is the most nominated with seventeen nominations and most awarded with eight wins.

== Superlatives ==
Categories	Recipient	Record
Most wins	Devi Sri Prasad	8
Most consecutive wins	Devi Sri Prasad	6 (2012–2013, 2015–2016, 2018–2019)
Most nominations	Devi Sri Prasad	17
Most consecutive nominations	Devi Sri Prasad	14 (2011–2021)
Most nominations without a win	Gopi Sundar	5
Most nominations without a win	Mickey J. Meyer	5
Oldest winner	M. M. Keeravani	Age 57 (7th SIIMA)
Youngest winner	Thaman S	Age 28 (1st SIIMA)
Oldest nominee	Ilaiyaraaja	Age 69 (1st SIIMA)
Youngest nominee	Thaman S	Age 28 (1st SIIMA)

== Winners ==
Year	Music director	Film	Ref
2011	Thaman S	Dookudu	
2012	Devi Sri Prasad	Gabbar Singh	
2013	Devi Sri Prasad	Attarintiki Daredi	
2014	Anup Rubens	Manam	
2015	Devi Sri Prasad	Srimanthudu	
2016	Devi Sri Prasad	Janatha Garage	
2017	M. M. Keeravani	Baahubali 2: The Conclusion	
2018	Devi Sri Prasad	Rangasthalam	
2019	Devi Sri Prasad	Maharshi	
2020	Thaman S	Ala Vaikunthapurramuloo	
2021	Devi Sri Prasad	Pushpa: The Rise	
2022	M. M. Keeravani	RRR	
2023	Hesham Abdul Wahab	Hi Nanna and Kushi	
2024	Devi Sri Prasad	Pushpa 2: The Rule	
2025	Thaman S	They Call Him OG	

== Nominations ==
- 2011: Thaman S – Dookudu
  - M. M. Keeravani – Rajanna
  - Kalyani Malik – Ala Modalaindi
  - Ilaiyaraaja – Sri Rama Rajyam
  - Devi Sri Prasad – 100% Love
- 2012: Devi Sri Prasad – Gabbar Singh
  - Devi Sri Prasad – Julayi
  - M. M. Keeravani – Eega
  - Thaman S – Businessman
  - Mani Sharma – Racha
- 2013: Devi Sri Prasad – Attarintiki Daredi
  - Devi Sri Prasad – Iddarammayilatho
  - Mickey J. Meyer – Seethamma Vakitlo Sirimalle Chettu
  - Thaman S – Naayak
  - Anup Rubens – Gunde Jaari Gallanthayyinde
- 2014: Anup Rubens – Manam
  - Thaman S – Race Gurram
  - Ghibran Vaibodha – Run Raja Run
  - Devi Sri Prasad – 1: Nenokkadine
  - Mickey J. Meyer – Mukunda
- 2015: Devi Sri Prasad – Srimanthudu
  - Devi Sri Prasad – S/O Satyamurthy
  - Gopi Sundar – Bhale Bhale Magadivoy
  - M. M. Keeravani – Baahubali: The Beginning
  - Thaman S – Bruce Lee: The Fighter
- 2016: Devi Sri Prasad – Janatha Garage
  - Kalyan Koduri – Jyo Achyutananda
  - Mickey J. Meyer – A Aa
  - Thaman S – Sarrainodu
  - Vivek Sagar – Pelli Choopulu
- 2017: M. M. Keeravani – Baahubali 2: The Conclusion
  - Devi Sri Prasad – Khaidi No. 150
  - Gopi Sundar – Ninnu Kori
  - Thaman S – Mahanubhavudu
  - Shakthikanth Karthick – Fidaa
- 2018: Devi Sri Prasad – Rangasthalam
  - Chaitan Bharadwaj – RX 100
  - Gopi Sundar – Geetha Govindam
  - Mickey J Meyer – Mahanati
  - Thaman S – Aravinda Sametha Veera Raghava
- 2019: Devi Sri Prasad – Maharshi
  - Mani Sharma – ISmart Shankar
  - Anirudh Ravichander – Jersey
  - Mickey J. Meyer – Gaddalakonda Ganesh
  - Gopi Sundar – Majili
- 2020: Thaman S – Ala Vaikunthapurramuloo
  - Devi Sri Prasad – Sarileru Neekevvaru
  - Mahati Swara Sagar – Bheeshma
  - Amit Trivedi – V
  - Kaala Bhairava – Colour Photo
- 2021: Devi Sri Prasad – Pushpa: The Rise
  - Thaman S – Akhanda
  - Pawan Ch – Love Story
  - Gopi Sundar – Most Eligible Bachelor
  - Radhan – Jathi Ratnalu
- 2022: M. M. Keeravani – RRR
  - Bheems Ceciroleo – Dhamaka
  - Ram Miriyala, Sricharan Pakala – DJ Tillu
  - Thaman S – Bheemla Nayak
  - Vishal Chandrashekhar – Sita Ramam
- 2023: Hesham Abdul Wahab – Hi Nanna and Kushi
  - Devi Sri Prasad – Waltair Veerayya
  - Santhosh Narayanan – Dasara
  - Thaman S – Veera Simha Reddy
  - Vijai Bulganin – Baby
- 2024: Devi Sri Prasad – Pushpa 2: The Rule
  - Anirudh Ravichander – Devara: Part 1
  - Gowra Hari – Hanu-Man
  - G. V. Prakash Kumar – Lucky Baskhar
  - Santhosh Narayanan – Kalki 2898 AD
  - Thaman S – Guntur Kaaram
- 2025: Thaman S – They Call Him OG
  - Bheems Ceciroleo – Sankranthiki Vasthunam
  - Devi Sri Prasad – Thandel
  - Gowra Hari – Mirai
  - Hesham Abdul Wahab – The Girlfriend
  - Vijai Bulganin – Court: State vs a Nobody
