= 8 Vasantalu =

2025 Indian Telugu-language film by Phanindra Narsetti

- Theatrical release poster
- Directed by: Phanindra Narsetti
- Written by: Phanindra Narsetti
- Produced by: Naveen Yerneni; Y. Ravi Shankar
- Starring: Ananthika Sanilkumar; Hanu Reddy; Raviteja Duggirala; Kanna Pasunoori
- Cinematography: Vishwanath Reddy Chelumalla
- Edited by: Shashank Mali
- Music by: Hesham Abdul Wahab
- Production company: Mythri Movie Makers
- Release date: 20 June 2025
- Running time: 137 minutes
- Country: India
- Language: Telugu

8 Vasantalu (transl. Eight Springs) is a 2025 Indian Telugu-language coming-of-age romantic drama film written and directed by Phanindra Narsetti, and produced by Mythri Movie Makers. The film features Ananthika Sanilkumar, Hanu Reddy and Raviteja Duggirala in leading roles.

8 Vasantalu was released in theatres on 20 June 2025 and received positive reviews from critics.

== Plot ==
Shuddhi Ayodhya is a young writer and martial artist raised by her mother in Ooty after the death of her army father. With clarity, courage and creative talent, she pours her grief into writing and emerges as a rising literary voice. When Varun walks into her life, love briefly blooms before heartbreak sets her on a path of self-reinvention. As Shuddhi moves through these emotional seasons, the film explores how each “spring” transforms her.

== Cast ==
- Ananthika Sanilkumar as Shuddhi Ayodhya
- Raviteja Duggirala as Sanjay
- Hanu Reddy as Varun
- Sanjana Hardageri as Anitha
- Kanna Pasunoori as Karthik
- Sameera Kishore as Yashoda
- Swaraj Rebbapragada as Master
- Sumant Vilas Nitturkar as Rahul

== Music ==
The soundtrack and background score is composed by Hesham Abdul Wahab.

All lyrics are written by Vanamali.

Track listing
No.	Title	Singer(s)	Length
1.	"Andhamaa Andhamaa"	Hesham Abdul Wahab, Aavani Malhar	4:36
2.	"Parichayamila"	K. S. Chithra	3:24

== Release ==
8 Vasantalu was released 20 June 2025. The post-theatrical digital distribution rights were acquired by Netflix and was released on 11 July 2025.

== Reception ==
Pratyusha Sista of Telangana Today wrote in her review that, "Technically, the film has a strong backbone. While Phanindra Narsetti's vision is clear and poetic, a tighter edit in the latter half could have helped maintain the flow". The Hindu called it "ambitious" and is like a "poem that's too conscious of its style", while opining that it "lacks soul". Echoing the same, Aditya Devulapally of Cinema Express wrote, "This is not a straight-up bad film. It's an over-written one that desperately wants to matter", while appreciating the cinematography. The Times of India was highly positive towards the cinematography and sound design, by Vishwanath Reddy and Hesham Abdul Wahab respectively.
