= Mouli Tanuj Prasanth =

Indian Telugu actor and YouTube content creator

Mouli Tanuj Prasanth, professionally known as Mouli Talks and Mouli, is an Indian actor and YouTube content creator known for his Telugu-language comedy and entertainment content.

== Early life ==
Mouli Tanuj Prasanth was born on 29 May 2000 in Visakhapatnam, Andhra Pradesh, India.

== Career ==
=== YouTube career ===
Mouli started his YouTube channel, Mouli Talks, in 2019. He became known for creating Telugu-language comedy videos, reaction videos, roast videos and entertainment content.

=== Acting career ===
Mouli has appeared in Telugu films and web series. His acting credits include Happy Birthday, Hostel Days, 90's – A Middle Class Biopic, Little Hearts and Donga Naa Koduku.

== Filmography ==
| Year | Title | Type |
|---|---|---|
| 2022 | Happy Birthday | |
| 2023 | Hostel Days | Web series |
| 2024 | 90's – A Middle Class Biopic | Web series |
| 2025 | Little Hearts | |
| 2026 | Donga Naa Koduku | |

== Personal life ==
Mouli Tanuj Prasanth was born in Visakhapatnam, Andhra Pradesh, India.
