= Makal =

2022 Indian film by Sathyan Anthikad

- Directed by: Sathyan Anthikad
- Written by: Iqbal Kuttippuram
- Produced by: Central Pictures
- Starring: Jayaram; Meera Jasmine; Devika Sanjay; Naslen
- Cinematography: S. Kumar
- Edited by: K. Rajagopal
- Music by: Songs: Vishnu Vijay; Score: Rahul Raj
- Production company: Central Pictures
- Release date: 29 April 2022
- Country: India
- Language: Malayalam

Makal (transl. Daughter) is a 2022 Indian Malayalam-language family drama film directed by Sathyan Anthikkad and written by Iqbal Kuttippuram. The film stars Jayaram, Meera Jasmine, Devika Sanjay and Naslen. It is produced by Central Pictures, the company that produced Anthikad's Kudumbapuranam, Kalikkalam, and Oru Indian Pranayakatha. This marks Jayaram's comeback after a three-year hiatus and is his 250th Malayalam movie. The film also marks Meera Jasmine's return to Mollywood after a six year gap.

This movie generally received mixed reviews from audience.

== Plot ==
The mother and daughter duo, Juliet and Aparna, have been living together for the best part of their lives, enjoying their freedom and level of understanding. After Aparna's father, Nandan, returns from the Gulf and Juliet gets a government job in another district, Nandan has to figure out how to be a father to his daughter. While the generation gap leads to a series of misunderstandings and squabbles, the entry of an unexpected stranger in their lives changes the father-daughter dynamics. The stranger's presence becomes a reason for them to connect meaningfully and live peacefully. Nandan starts a masala powder company that he claims as poison free due to which people starts buying this after seeing filmstar Srinivasan video clip telling he appreciate such an organic masala powder that is not harmful for health. Rohith is a new student and he loves Aparna but Aparna doesn't show her acceptance and keeps avoiding so rohith enters this masala powder company as a worker. Rohith's identity gets caught by nandan but mistakes Aparna also in love with Rohith. When nandan blames Aparna for her not informing the disguised Rohith working in nandans masala factory, Aparna gets angry and drives their car to out but hits a tree and stops, nandan comes and console her and Aparna tells she hit down someone who got thrown away, nandan finds out a unconscious person and takes him to hospital, the stranger shows abnormal behaviour and speaks only different language, so nandan finds out he is a rogue so decide to drive him away but on entering the car ,this stranger tells he wants Aparna his daughter to accompany and so all of them go together, while sitting in a tea shop some gang who was enemy of this rogue comes and involves a fight, in-between this rogue remember how his daughter and wife got killed and so fights down all the enemies. Now nandan returns with Aparna back in his car as the rogue identified Aparna is not his daughter. Thus father and daughter unites comes together for picking back mother Juliet who frustrated with the office manager resigns the job and comes out gets surprised seeing nandan and Aparna together.

== Cast ==
- Jayaram as Nandakumar, Appu's father and Juliet's husband
- Meera Jasmine as Juliet (Julie), Nandakumar's wife and Appu's mother
- Devika Sanjay as Aparna (Appu), Nandakumar's daughter
- Naslen as Rohit (Rabindra Chattopadhyay), Appu's love interest
- Balaji Manohar as Garuda Naik
- Innocent as Ayurveda Dr. Govindan, Nandakumar's father
- Siddique as Bobby, Juliet's brother and Nandakumar's brother-law
- Jayasankar Karimuttam as Lawrence
- Dayyana Hameed as Fathima, Juliet's colleague
- Kottayam Ramesh as Premlal, Senior Superintendent at Juliet's workplace
- Sreedhanya as Dr. Susan, Bobby's wife
- Ranjini George as Maggie
- Sreeja Ajith as Rohit's mother
- Althaf Salim as Thief Solomon
- Sreelatha Namboothiri as mental patient
- Meera Nair as Betty, Juliet's elder sister
- RJ Nilja as Sangeetha, Rohit’s sister
- Krishna Praba as dance teacher
- Aneetha as Kokila, Garuda Naik's daughter
- Nimisha as Garuda Naik's wife
- Unni Nair as Madhavan Nambuthiri
- Mani Shoranur as Kunjuttan, Nandan’s manager
- Latha Sathish as Govindan's wife
- Jaise Jose as supermarket manager
- Sreenivasan as himself

== Production ==
The filming commenced in October 2021 in Kerala, with Jayaram joining the sets on 21 October. On 12 December, actor Jayaram informed via a tweet that he was in the final leg of filming. The shoot was wrapped in late-December.

== Music ==
The film score is composed, orchestrated, and produced by Rahul Raj, while the songs are composed by Vishnu Vijay.

== Release ==
=== Theatrical ===
The film was released in theatres on 29 April 2022.

=== Home media ===
The digital rights of the film were acquired by ManoramaMAX. The satellite rights are owned by Mazhavil Manorama.

== Reception ==
The film received mixed reviews, praising the performances, direction, and humour but was criticised for its plot, writing, and climax.
