= Sesham Mike-il Fathima =

2023 Indian film by Manu C. Kumar

- Theatrical release poster
- Directed by: Manu C. Kumar
- Written by: Manu C. Kumar
- Produced by: Sudhan Sundaram; Jagadish Palanisamy
- Starring: Kalyani Priyadarshan
- Cinematography: Santhana Krishnan Ravichandran
- Edited by: Kiran Das
- Music by: Hesham Abdul Wahab
- Production companies: Passion Studios; The Route
- Distributed by: Dream Big Films (Kerala); Sree Gokulam Movies (worldwide)
- Release date: 10 November 2023
- Running time: 138 minutes
- Country: India
- Language: Malayalam

Sesham Mike-il Fathima (transl. Up next, Fathima on mike) is a 2023 Indian Malayalam-language comedy-drama film written and directed by Manu C. Kumar in his directorial debut. The film stars Kalyani Priyadarshan in the title role, alongside an ensemble supporting cast. The film narrates the story of Fathima Noorjahan (Kalyani Priyadarshan), a young Muslim woman from Malappuram who aspires to become a football commentator.

The film was officially announced in September 2022. Principal photography began in the same month and wrapped up in November 2022. The music was composed by Hesham Abdul Wahab. The cinematography and editing were handled by Santhana Krishnan Ravichandran and Kiran Das.

Sesham Mike-il Fathima was released on 10 November 2023 during the week of Diwali to negative reviews from critics and was a box office bomb.

== Plot ==
Fathima Noorjahan "Pathu" is an educated young woman from a middle-class, orthodox Muslim family in Malappuram. Fathima's family consists of her father Muneer, mother Noorjahan, brother Asif, and grandmother. She has been interested in giving commentary on cartoons and live football matches since she was a child. One day, Fathima gets an opportunity to provide live commentary in a local football tournament through Asif. Fathima impresses the audience with her commentary and receives appreciation.

Fathima's family arranges a marriage proposal for her; however, it is cancelled due to her talkative nature. She gets a letter to join an internship at a biotechnology lab and departs for Kochi. Fathima meets Ramya Aavani, a journalist who was her senior at college, and reveals her desire to pursue a career as a football commentator. With Ramya's help, Fathima meets Jayesh Nair, the president of the Kerala Football Federation, to inquire about the chances of commentary in the Indian Football League (IFL). Fathima and Ramya meet Shaiju Damodaran and learn about Shiva Narayanan, the deputy broadcast director of the IFL.

Fathima and Ramya meet with Sports Minister Beena Johny, but don't receive the expected help. Through Ramya's help, Fathima gets a job as an administrative assistant at a sports academy owned by Catherine. Fathima is recommended as a commentator for the Kerala School League football tournament by Solomon Margaret, a banned football player and one of the academy's co-founders. When Fathima arrives at the tournament, Jayesh insults her by saying that football commentary is a male-dominated field and that a female voice will not be appropriate.

Vijay John, a prominent member of the IFL, meets with Solomon and Fathima and tells them that he will discuss the matter with Shiva, who is arriving for the IFL organizing committee meeting. Fathima tries to meet Shiva on the meeting day, but Jayesh instructs the security to block Fathima. When Vijay tells Solomon about his helplessness, Solomon goes and beats up Jayesh, who is causing all kinds of problems. Catherine tells Fathima how Solomon was banned by the anti-doping agency and the suspected involvement of Jayesh in the cheating.

Fathima returns to Malappuram when she receives an invitation to provide commentary for the inter-district school tournament final. Jayesh threatens and humiliates Fathima, when she arrives for the match with her family. Fathima comes back to Kochi, and with the help of Prashant, a sports reporter, Ramya provides Shiva's Instagram ID to her. Fathima unknowingly reveals to crime reporter Alex Kurian that Solomon was the one responsible for Jayesh's assault. As a result of Alex's newspaper reporting, Solomon's ban is extended for another two years. Solomon attempts suicide, and Fathima later tells him that she is responsible for the news report.

At a children's programme, Ramya invites Fathima to give live Tom and Jerry commentary. A girl gives Fathima a chocolate, and in it, Fathima sees a message from Shiva about a meeting in the IFL stadium conference room. Along with some people, Muneer and Asif arrive at Ramya's house and take Fathima with them. On the way, Fathima convinces Asif and Muneer and reaches the stadium on time. Fathima visits Shiva in the conference room, and Shiva tells her that it was his daughter who gave her the chocolate. Fathima starts introducing herself in regional slang when Deepika, the scheduling director, asks her. She provides live commentary on the free kick footage of Roberto Carlos to when Shiva asks her to demonstrates her commentary skills.

However, Deepika conveys her concerns to Shiva about the risks of hiring Fathima over veteran stars and sports journalists and tells Fathima to try next year. When Jayesh's friend L. P. Gopakumar makes fun of Fathima, she explains the physics behind Roberto Carlos's free kick, which impresses Shiva and Deepika. Fathima is invited by Shiva to join the commentary team for the match between Kerala Blasters FC and Mumbai City FC. The next day, Fathima joins Shaiju Damodaran and I. M. Vijayan in the commentary box and begins commentary.

== Cast ==
- Kalyani Priyadarshan as Fathima Noorjahan "Pathu"
- Gautham Vasudev Menon as Shiva Narayanan (cameo appearance)
- Sudheesh as Muneer
- Femina George as Ramya Aavani
- Shaheen Siddique as Solomon Margaret
- Aneesh G. Menon as Asif
  - Vasudev Sajeesh Marar as Young Asif
- Sabumon Abdusamad as Jayesh Nair
- Shaju Sreedhar as L. P. Gopakumar
- Unnimaya Prasad as Deepika
- Priya Sreejith as Noorjahan
- Sminu Sijo as Beena Johny
- Thennal Abhilash as Kunju Fathima
- Privin Vinish as Sobin
- Balachandran Chullikkad as himself
- I. M. Vijayan as himself
- Shaiju Damodaran as himself
- Mohammed Rafi as himself
- Parvathi T. as Catherine
- Navas Vallikkunnu as Rafeeq
- Balan Parakkal as Khader
- Jayaraj Calicut as Ahmed
- Sarasa Balussery as Fathima's grandmother
- Vijay Menon as Vijay John

== Production ==
=== Development ===
The film marks the directorial debut of Manu C. Kumar, who was a former journalist. He wrote the story of the film during 2017–18 and told it to Kalyani Priyadarshan in 2019 when she was acting in Varane Avashyamund (2020). Sudhan Sundaram and Jagadish Palanisamy jointly produced the film under the banners of Passion Studios and The Route. Santhana Krishnan Ravichandran and Kiran Das were assigned as the cinematographer and editor, respectively.

=== Casting ===
Kalyani Priyadarshan was signed to play the lead role in the film as a football commentator based in Malappuram. The film also marks her second appearance as a Malabar-based character after Thallumaala (2022). She also trained in Malappuram slang and dubbed herself in the film. Kalyani Priyadarshan reportedly approached Surabhi Lakshmi in order to learn Malabar slang. Shaheen Siddique was reported to appear in an extended cameo role.

=== Filming ===
The film was officially announced by the makers on 11 September 2022 with a customary puja ceremony. Principal photography began on 14 September 2022. The first schedule was completed on 5 October 2022. Malappuram was set as the film's main location. The filming wrapped up on 2 November 2022.

As part of the promotions, Kalyani Priyadarshan made a football commentary during a match between Kerala Blasters FC and Odisha FC at the Jawaharlal Nehru Stadium on 28 October 2023.

== Music ==
Sesham Mike-il Fathima

Soundtrack album by Hesham Abdul Wahab
- Released: 2023
- Genre: Feature film soundtrack
- Language: Malayalam
- Label: Think Music

Hesham Abdul Wahab chronology
Kushi (2023)	Sesham Mike-il Fathima (2023)	Spark L.I.F.E (2023)

The music and background score were composed by Hesham Abdul Wahab. The first single "Tatta Tattara" was released on 27 May 2023. It is the first Malayalam song sung by Anirudh Ravichander, with lyrics written by Suhail Koya in Malappuram dialect.

Track listing
No.	Title	Lyrics	Singer(s)	Length
1.	"Tatta Tattara"	Suhail Koya	Anirudh Ravichander	3:05

== Release ==
=== Theatrical ===
The film was originally scheduled to be released on 3 November 2023. It was later postponed, and on 30 October 2023, a new release date was announced by the makers. The film was released in theatres on 10 November 2023 during the week of Deepavali. The worldwide theatrical distribution rights were acquired by Sree Gokulam Movies of Gokulam Gopalan, and Dream Big Films distributed the film in Kerala. It was also reported that the makers initially planned the film as a direct OTT release instead of a theatrical release.

=== Home media ===
The post-theatrical digital distribution rights were sold to Netflix. The film began streaming on the platform on 15 December 2023 in Malayalam, Tamil, Kannada, Telugu, and Hindi.

== Reception ==
=== Critical response ===
Sesham Mike-il Fathima received highly negative reviews from critics.

Raisa Nasreen of Times Now gave 3 out of 5 stars. Gayathri Krishna of OTTPlay gave 3 out of 5 stars and wrote, "Sesham Mikeil Fathima is a good watch, but it could have been better with a few poignant emotional scenes and a more concise plot." Gopika Is of The Times of India gave 2.5 out of 5 stars and wrote, "Sesham Mikeil Fathima, directed by Manu C Kumar, is a chirpy, loud movie but a half-hearted attempt at exploring the aspects of a girl from a conservative background achieving her dreams."

Sowmya Rajendran of The News Minute gave 2.5 out of 5 stars and wrote, "Football fans may take pleasure in the cameos and trivia that the film has on offer, and Kalyani is sure-footed in kicking the ball. But the writing and direction come in the way of her scoring a goal." Athira M of The Hindu wrote, "Debutant director Manu C Kumar's film effectively and endearingly zooms in on how a Muslim girl chases her dream to become a football commentator." Princy Alexander of Onmanorama wrote, "Sesham Mikeil Fathima tells the story of a girl who struggles to make a mark as a commentator in a man's world."
