= Devika Sanjay =

Indian actress

- Born: Devika; Koyilandy, Kozhikode, Kerala, India
- Occupation: Actress
- Years active: 2018–present

Devika Sanjay is an Indian actress who works mainly in Malayalam films. Her first feature film was Njan Prakashan in 2018. She is best known for her role in the film Makal (2022).

== Early life ==
Devika was born to Sanjay and Sreelatha in Koyilandy, in Kozhikode district. She was educated at Kendriya Vidyalaya, Kozhikode.

== Career ==
Devika made her screen debut as an actress, her 2018 film "Njan Prakashan", where she plays Teenamol a girl suffering from a cancerous brain cyst and facing death. At one point in the film, Prakashan, portrayed by Fahadh Faasil, joins Teenamol in her house as a home nurse.

There is a rumor that she was going to play the female lead in Panja Vaisshnav Tej’s Uppena, but Krithi Shetty ended up playing that role.

Later in 2022, Devika played a prominent role in Sathyan Anthikkad's Makal as the daughter of Meera Jasmine and Jayaram. In 2024, she did the female lead in Once Upon a Time in Kochi written by Raffi and directed by Nadirshah.

== Filmography ==
=== Films ===
Key
†	Denotes films that have not yet been released

- All films are in Malayalam unless otherwise noted.

Year	Title	Role	Notes	Ref.
2018	Njan Prakashan	Teenamol	Debut	
2022	Makal	Aparna (Appu)		
2024	Once Upon a Time in Kochi	Janaki Jayan		
2026	Sukhamano Sukhamann	Charu		
