= Basanti (2014 film) =

Indian romantic action film

- Promotional poster
- Directed by: Chaitanya Dantuluri
- Written by: Srikanth Vissa (dialogues)
- Screenplay by: Chaitanya Dantuluri
- Story by: Chaitanya Dantuluri
- Produced by: Chaitanya Dantuluri
- Starring: Raja Goutham; Alisha Baig
- Cinematography: P. K. Varma; Anil Bandari
- Edited by: Marthand K. Venkatesh
- Music by: Mani Sharma
- Production company: Start Camera Pictures
- Release date: 28 February 2014
- Country: India
- Language: Telugu

Basanti is a 2014 Indian Telugu-language romantic action film directed by Baanam-fame Chaitanya Dantuluri and starring Raja Goutham and Alisha Baig.

== Cast ==
- Raja Goutham as Arjun
- Alisha Baig as Roshini
- Randhir Gattla
- Naveena Jackson
- Srikanth Iyengar as Gaazi
- Tanikella Bharani as Arjun's father
- Sayaji Shinde as Police commissioner Ali Khan, Roshini's father
- Dhanraj
- Mani Kiran
- Baasha
- Bhanu Avirneni
- Madhavi
- Bhanu Avirneni
- Sujatha Reddy
- Sandhya Janak

== Soundtrack ==
The music was composed by Mani Sharma. The audio was launched on 9 February 2014 at the Park Hyatt Hotel in Hyderabad with Bhimaneni Srinivasa Rao, Brahmanandam, Johnny Lever, Manchu Vishnu, Shekhar Kammula, Sunil, T. Subbarami Reddy, Trivikram Srinivas, and Vamsi Paidipally in attendance. Karthik Srinivasan of Milliblog wrote that "After a long time, Mani Sharma is in very good form, in Basanti!"

- "Thirugubaatidhi" - Srikrishna, Karunya Ram, Hemachandra, Sahithi
- "Paaripothunna" - Pawan
- "Pratheekshanam"
- "The Spirit of Basanti"
- "Vellakura" - Deepu

== Reception ==
Jeevi of Idlebrain.com rated the film three out of five stars and wrote that "Chaitanya Danthuluri is a promising filmmaker and takes up a potential subject, but falls short in making it a well-made film". A critic from The Times of India wrote that "The film has a much more purpose than entertainment. It inspires one not to give in to a situation but rise above it, even if it means facing a risk". A critic from The Hans India rated the film three out of five and wrote that "Director Chaitanya after Banam has yet again created another good movie. The plot and narration of the story are excellent. Though the lead role players are not very matured, even then they have strived to deliver their best performance".
