= Pallakilo Pellikoothuru =

- DVD cover
- Directed by: Suchitra Chandrabose
- Screenplay by: K. Raghavendra Rao; Abburi Ravi (dialogues)
- Story by: Suchitra Chandrabose
- Produced by: Prasad Devineni
- Starring: Goutham; Rathi
- Cinematography: V. Srinivasa Reddy
- Edited by: Marthand K. Venkatesh
- Music by: M. M. Keeravani
- Production company: Sri Vara Siddhi Vinayaka Films
- Release date: 2004
- Country: India
- Language: Telugu

Pallakilo Pellikoothuru (transl. The bride in a palanquin) is a 2004 Indian Telugu-language romantic drama film directed by Suchitra Chandrabose. Its stars Goutham and Rathi. The film introduces Brahmanandam's son Goutham and marked Rathi's Telugu debut. K. Raghavendra Rao scripted the film in addition to supervising the direction.

== Plot ==
The film follows Rani (Rathi), a woman who is due to marry an NRI. She attends a school called Pallaki College to help her get accustomed to the American way of life. The school is run by Goutham (Goutham)'s family. Whether Gowtam expresses his love to Rani or lets Rani marry an NRI forms the rest of the plot.

== Cast ==
- Goutham as Gowtam
- Rathi as Rani
- Vaibhav
- Giri Babu
- Chandra Mohan
- Tanikella Bharani
- Brahmanandam
- Dharmavarapu Subramanyam as Dance Master
- M. S. Narayana as Suleiman
- Sunil
- Venu Madhav as Pelli Kaani Prasad "PP"
- Balayya as Rani's grandfather
- Kondavalasa Lakshmana Rao
- Ravi Babu as Dubai Babu
- Mustafa
- Rama Prabha
- Telangana Shakuntala as Pallaki College principal
- Sudha as a fashion designer
- Hema
- Sirisha
- Shakeela as Kanyakumari
- Sunayana
- Aswini Sharma
- Sathipandu

== Production ==
Suchitra Chandrabose conceived the story while on the sets of Paradesi (1998). Brahmanandam helped his then 19 year old son Raja Gowtam receive this film opportunity. Gowtam learned acting under the training of Satyanand in Vizag.

== Soundtrack ==
Songs composed by M. M. Keeravani. Lyrics by Chandrabose.

- "Naa Peru Cheppukondi"
- "Nuvvu Pre Nenu Ma"
- "Vanaku Tadisina Vallu"
- "Muddu Leni Prema"
- "Chempaku Chukkalu Petti"
- "Cheeraloni Goppatanam"

== Reception ==
A critic from Sify opined that "Pallakilo Pellikoothuru is disappointing from the word go". On the contrary, Gudipoodi Srihari of The Hindu wrote that "Though the film is set in the same formula mode of Raghavendra Rao, the treatment of the subject is pleasant experience with all those pleasantries, fun and frolic and bonhomie of a marriage". Jeevi of Idlebrain.com wrote that "First half of the film is mediocre. Second half is a let down. Plus points of the film are music, heroine and songs picturization. Negative points are old-fashioned filmmaking, predictable screenplay, non-contemporary treatment".
