= Epic (2026 film) =

2026 film by Aditya Haasan

- Theatrical release poster
- Directed by: Aditya Haasan
- Written by: Aditya Haasan
- Produced by: Suryadevara Naga Vamsi; Sai Soujanya
- Starring: Anand Deverakonda; Vaishnavi Chaitanya
- Cinematography: Azeem Mohammad
- Edited by: Navin Nooli
- Music by: Hesham Abdul Wahab
- Production companies: Sithara Entertainments; Fortune Four Cinemas
- Distributed by: Annapurna Studios
- Release date: 11 September 2026
- Country: India
- Language: Telugu

Epic: First Semester is a 2026 Indian Telugu-language coming-of-age romance film written and directed by Aditya Haasan. It stars Anand Deverakonda and Vaishnavi Chaitanya. Set in London, the plot follows Aditya (Deverakonda), a middle-class boy from Wanaparthy, Telangana who moves to the UK for higher studies and meets Kadali (Chaitanya), a strong-willed independent girl from Visakhapatnam, Andhra Pradesh. They quickly become friends and move in together, as they navigate their complicated relationship.

Epic is a spin-off of the TV series 90's – A Middle Class Biopic (2024) and tells the story of grown up Aditya. Rohan Roy, Sivaji and Vasuki Anand reprise their roles from the series. The film began it's produtction in May 2025 and shot extensively in London.

Epic: First Semester was theatrically released on 11 September 2026.

== Cast ==
- Anand Deverakonda as Aditya
  - Master Rohan Roy as Young Aditya
- Vaishnavi Chaitanya as Kadali
- Sivaji as Chandra Sekhar
- Vasuki Anand as Shobha Rani
- Kalyan Shankar as Sinjith
- Srinivas Gavireddy as Manoj
- Jane Serena as Karthika
- Kadambari Kiran as Maddhuleti

== Production ==
In April 2025, writer-director Aditya Haasan who made his debut with Middle Class Melodies (2020) signed a film with Sithara Entertainments. The film was launched in May 2025. Anand Deverakonda and Vaishnavi Chaitanya, who earlier starred in the romantic drama Baby (2023), were cast as a pair for this film.

Epic, is a continuation of director's own TV series, 90's – A Middle Class Biopic (2024). It follows grown up version of the younger brother Aditya. Child actor Rohan Roy, Sivaji, and Vasuki Anand reprise their roles from the series. The film is shot extensively in London.

== Music ==
=== Soundtrack ===
Epic: First Semester

Soundtrack album by Hesham Abdul Wahab
- Released: September 9, 2026
- Recorded: 2025–2026
- Studio: HW Studio (Kochi)
- Genre: Feature film soundtrack
- Length: 17:47
- Language: Telugu
- Label: Aditya Music
- Producer: Hesham Abdul Wahab

Hesham Abdul Wahab chronology
Once More (2026)	Epic: First Semester (2026)	'Brindavihari' (2026)

All music is composed by Hesham Abdul Wahab.

Epic: First Semester (Original Motion Picture Soundtrack)
No.	Title	Lyrics	Singer(s)	Length
1.	"Sancharame"	Goreti Venkanna	Hesham Abdul Wahab, Goreti Venkanna	3:08
2.	"Priyasakhi"	Suresh Banisetti	K. S. Harisankar, Hesham Abdul Wahab	3:44
3.	"Manasa Vacha"	Sri Harsha Emani	S. P. Charan, K. S. Chithra	4:15
4.	"Sabko"	Sri Harsha Emani	Sanjith Hegde, Sithara Krishnakumar	3:02
5.	"Kadali"	Purnachary	Karthik	3:38
Total length:				17:47

== Release ==
=== Theatrical ===
Epic: First Semester was theatrically released on 11 September 2026.

== Reception ==
=== Critical reception ===
Writing for The Hindu, Sangeetha Devi called the film "promising but incomplete coming-of-age story." Yashaswini Sri of The Indian Express, rated the film 2/5 stars and said it is "terribly slow film with a deliberately incomplete end." The Times of India's Divya Sree, rated Epic 3/5 stars, and opined that the film is a relationship drama that attempts to go beyond the usual romantic template.

== Sequel ==
While a sequel titled Epic: Final Semester is planned, producer Naga Vamsi stated that the actual development of the sequel will depend on the film's performance following its release.
