= Brahma Anandam =

2025 Indian Telugu film

- Theatrical release poster
- Directed by: RVS Nikhil
- Written by: RVS Nikhil
- Produced by: Rahul Yadav Nakka
- Starring: Brahmanandam; Raja Goutham; Vennela Kishore
- Cinematography: Mithesh Parvathaneni
- Edited by: Praneeth Kumar
- Music by: Sandilya Pisapati
- Production company: Swadharm Entertainment
- Release date: 14 February 2025
- Running time: 148 minutes
- Language: Telugu

Brahma Anandam is a 2025 Telugu-language comedy drama film written and directed by RVS Nikhil. It was produced by Rahul Yadav Nakka, under Swadharm Entertainment. It starred Brahmanandam, Raja Goutham and Vennela Kishore in important roles. The film was released on 14 February 2025.

== Plot ==
The film follows Brahmanandam "Brahma", a middle-class actor, characterized by his sarcastic wit and self absorbed personality. Despite his passion towards writing and performing, he struggles with achieving success financially and within his career. He decides to sign with a renowned agency that guarantees to book him for big shows, for which he needs to procure a large sum of 5 lakhs. But Brahma is broke and is struggling to make ends meet. With all this commotion in his life and his inconsistent career, his girlfriend Tara breaks up with him, leaving him distraught.

Amid this crisis, Brahma is reintroduced to his grandfather Ananda Ram Murthy, a novel writer, after 15 years. Murthy is abandoned by his younger son and is forced to live in an old age home. Dissatisfied with his life, he wishes to spend his last days in his native village, so he asks Brahma to come with him. Brahma, neck-deep in trouble doesn't care to help his grandfather. Knowing his grandson's condition, Murthy suggests he can sell their ancestral assets, so that Brahmacan take the money to pursue his dreams. Tempted by this offer, Brahma takes his grandfather to their village.

But he missed the fact that Murthy was a writer before. This time, his story is sold. Brahma goes to the village to find out they don't have any assets there. In fact, it's not even their hometown.

Murthy tricks his grandson, and then pulls in Brahma to say his main idea. The biggest revelation of it, turns out Murthy is in love with a woman, with whom he stayed in the old age home. And apparently, she is the mother of the village's sarpanch. A typical teenage love story, but it is two old people here, who just need a companion in their end of life. And Murthy asks Brahma to help him out with the issue.

This blew Brahma's mind, making him packs his bags to leave for the city. Fate, however, has other plans for him and he is forced to stay on until he completes a huge task given to him by the Sarpanch.

In a village that goes to sleep by 7pm, has no internet, no network, and no way of connecting with the outside world other than through an STD booth, he is tasked with uniting a 70-year-old couple. That day, he was so sure he'd be dying single in that village.

== Cast ==
- Brahmanandam as Chilaka Ananda Ram Murthy
- Raja Goutham as Chilaka "Brahma" Brahmanandam, Ananda Ram’s grandson
- Vennela Kishore as Giri
- Rajeev Kanakala as Sarpanch, Tanuja’s father
- Sampath Raj as Samarla Manohar, Sarpanch’s brother
- Priya Vadlamani as Tara
- Aishwarya Holakkal as Samarla Tanuja, Manohar's nephew
- Raghu Babu as Sarpanch and Manohar’s father
- Tanikella Bharani
- ETV Prabhakar as Brahma’s uncle, Rashi’s father and Murthy’s son
- Divija Prabhakar as Chilaka Rashi, Brahma’s cousin sister
- Dayananda Reddy as Sarpanch’s uncle
- Josh Ravi
- Talluri Rameswari as Samarla Jyothi

== Production ==
On 8 May 2024, the makers of the film announced the title of the film as Brahma Anandam through an official poster. The first look of Brahmanandam was revealed on 16 August 2024, followed by a glimpse on 19 August 2024. On 16 January 2025 the teaser of the film was released.

== Music ==
The soundtrack album and background score were composed by Sandilya Pisapati. On 9 January 2025, the first single "Anandamaaye" song was released. On 27 January 2025 The "Village" song was released by M. M. Keeravani, the song lyrics was written by Suresh Banisetti and sung by Ram Miriyala.

No.	Title	Lyrics	Singer(s)	Length
1.	"Anandamaaye"	Sri Sai Kiran	Yashwanth Nag, Manisha Eerabathini	3:17
2.	"Village Song"	Suresh Banisetti	Ram Miriyala	3:37
3.	"Recchipovaale"	Sri Sai Kiran	Saketh Komanduri, Sandilya Pisapati	3:35

== Release ==
Brahma Anandam was released theatrically on 14 February 2025, coinciding with Valentine's Day. It was released on Aha on 19 March 2025.

== Reception ==
Calling it a "lost opportunity" due to unconventional premise with too many subplots, The Hindu was positive of performances of the lead cast (particularly Vennela Kishore). Echoing the same, Times Now rated it 2.5 out of 5 and wrote "to a certain extent, the narrative emerges as a compelling exploration of human frailty and resilience, challenging societal norms". Telugucinema.com also gave the same rating and stated, "Brahma Anandam has impressive premise and tackles an intriguing subject, and the film's midsection is engaging, but its helter-skelter screenplay and rushed climax have diminished the overall experience".
