= Raja Goutham =

Telugu film actor

- Other name: Goutham
- Years active: 2004–present
- Father: Brahmanandam

Raja Goutham is an Indian film actor, who appears in Telugu films. He is a frequent collaborator with his father Brahmanandam.

== Career ==
Raja Goutham learned acting at age 19 in his final year of BBA under Satyanand in Vizag. He made his debut in Telugu with the movie Pallakilo Pellikoothuru (2004) after his father helped him fetch the offer. Though it was a high-profile launch involving names like K. Raghavendra Rao and M. M. Keeravani, the film was a box office failure. His performance received mixed reviews with critics citing him as average and needing improvement. He reportedly denied the film Godavari, citing the film as female-centric". After the failure of his first film, Brahmanandam didn't further help his son for a period as he wanted him to learn on his own. His next film Vareva (2011) had a low key release. Raja Goutham revealed his interest to do good films the reason for the long gap in between his films.

His histrionics in the film Basanti in serious and action scenes were better received by critics but the film was also released to mixed reviews.

Raja Goutham collaborated with short filmmaker Phanindra Narsetti for the crowdfunded venture Manu. He okayed the film during a script narration at a coffee shop. Although the film was released to mixed reviews, the roles of the lead cast were cited as "career-defining".

The thriller film Break Out, which began production in 2022, only released in 2025 through ETV Win. He played a grandson to his father in Brahma Anandam (2025), which was also released to mixed reviews.

== Personal life ==
He married his girlfriend Jyothsna on 25 October 2012.

== Filmography ==
Year	Title	Role	Notes
2004	Pallakilo Pellikoothuru	Goutham	credited as Goutham
2011	Vareva	Rishi	credited as Goutham
2016	Charuseela		Voice role; credited as Goutham
2014	Basanti	Arjun	
2018	Manu	Manu	
2025	Break Out	Maniratnam	
2025	Brahma Anandam	Chilaka Brahmanandam	

=== Television ===
Year	Title	Role	Network	Notes
2023	Dhootha	Chakrapani Veerula	Amazon Prime Video	
