= 90's – A Middle Class Biopic =

Indian drama series

- Promotional poster
- Genre: Drama
- Created by: Aditya Hasan
- Written by: Aditya Hasan
- Directed by: Aditya Hasan
- Starring: Sivaji; Vasuki Anand; Mouli; Anil; Vasanthika; Siddarth; Rohan Roy
- Music by: Suresh Bobbili
- Country of origin: India
- Original language: Telugu
- No. of seasons: 1
- No. of episodes: 6

Production
- Executive producer: Sharveen
- Producers: Naveen Medaram; Rajasekhar Medaram
- Cinematography: Azeem Mohammad
- Editor: Sreedhar Sompalli
- Camera setup: Multi-camera
- Production companies: MNO Productions and Amogha Arts

Original release
- Network: ETV Win
- Release: 5 January 2024

90's – A Middle Class Biopic is a 2024 Indian Telugu-language family drama television series created, written and directed by Aditya Hasan. The series was produced by Naveen Medaram and Rajasekhar Medaram. It stars Sivaji, Vasuki Anand, Mouli, Snehal Kamath, Vasanthika, and Rohan Roy in important roles. It premiered on ETV Win on 5 January 2024. It received highly positive reviews from critics.

A spin-off film, Epic was released in 2026, which tells the story of grown up younger brother in the series.

== Plot ==
In the heart of Wanaparthy, 90's tale revolves around Chandra Sekhar, a dedicated government teacher, and his wife, Rani, who tirelessly manages their modest home. The couple raises their three children - Raghu Teja, Divya, and Aditya - amid everyday struggles of a middle-class life.

Their lives echo the challenges of balancing dreams and reality, especially for the children, often left disheartened by the compromises demanded by their financial circumstances. Sekhar, fiercely devoted to his children's education, maintains a stern stance, believing in the transformative power of learning.

The narrative unravels as a poignant rollercoaster, delving into the spectrum of emotions that resonate within a middle-class family. It offers a compelling exploration of familial bonds, aspirations, and the intricate dynamics amidst the backdrop of a rapidly changing society. As each character navigates their unique journey, the series delicately interweaves hope, sacrifice, and the pursuit of a better tomorrow.

== Cast ==
- Sivaji as Madham Chandra Sekhar; Raghu, Divya, and Aditya's father
- Vasuki Anand as Madham Shobha Rani; Raghu, Divya, and Aditya's mother
- Mouli as Madham Raghu Teja, Divya and Aditya's elder brother
- Vasanthika Macha as Madham Divya, Raghu's younger sister and Aditya's elder sister
- Rohan Roy as Madham Aditya, Raghu and Divya's younger brother
- Anil as Karthik, Raghu's best friend
- Siddarth as Naveed, Divya's classmate and love interest
- Snehal Kamat as Suchita David Paul, Raghu's classmate and love interest

== Episodes ==
Series	Episodes	Originally released
1	6	5 January 2024

No. overall	No. in season	Title	Directed by	Written by	Original release date
1	1	"100 Rupees"	Aditya Haasan	Aditya Haasan	5 January 2024
2	2	"Signature"	Aditya Haasan	Aditya Haasan	5 January 2024
3	3	"Rat Race"	Aditya Haasan	Aditya Haasan	5 January 2024
4	4	"Upma"	Aditya Haasan	Aditya Haasan	5 January 2024
5	5	"Fair and Cream"	Aditya Haasan	Aditya Haasan	5 January 2024
6	6	"Slam Book"	Aditya Haasan	Aditya Haasan	5 January 2024

== Reception ==
Chatakonda Krishna of Hindustan Times gave the series 3.35/5 stars in their review and wrote that "This is a perfect web series to watch with family. Even though it may seem long here and there, it does not get boring". A critic from Eenadu called it "A beautiful emotional Journey".
