= Hi Nanna =

2023 Indian film by Shouryuv

- Theatrical release poster
- Directed by: Shouryuv
- Screenplay by: Shouryuv; Bhanu Dheeraj Rayudu; Vasanth Sameer Pinnamaraju
- Story by: Shouryuv
- Dialogues by: Nagendra Kasi; Vamshi Bommena
- Produced by: Mohan Cherukuri (CVM); Dr. Vijender Reddy Teegala; Murthy K. S.
- Starring: Nani; Mrunal Thakur
- Cinematography: Sanu Varghese
- Edited by: Praveen Anthony
- Music by: Hesham Abdul Wahab
- Production company: Vyra Entertainments
- Release date: 7 December 2023
- Running time: 155 minutes
- Country: India
- Language: Telugu
- Budget: ₹65 crore
- Box office: ₹75.35 crore

Hi Nanna (transl. Hi Dad) is a 2023 Indian Telugu-language romantic drama film directed by Shouryuv (in his directoral debut) and produced by Vyra Entertainments. The film stars Nani and Mrunal Thakur in lead roles alongside Kiara Khanna, Jayaram and Priyadarshi Pulikonda. The music is composed by Hesham Abdul Wahab.

The plot follows six-year-old Mahi, a girl battling cystic fibrosis, who lives with her loving father, Viraj. Her quest to learn about her absent mother leads to a chance encounter with Yashna, a woman unknowingly connected to her past, unraveling a heartfelt story of lost memories, love, and destiny.

Hi Nanna was released on 7 December 2023, where it received highly positive reviews from audience and critics. The film was applauded for its direction, screenplay, cast performances, and music. It became a superhit at the box office.

== Plot ==
Six-year-old Mahi lives in Mumbai with her father Viraj, a successful fashion photographer, her grandfather, and their pet dog, Pluto. Mahi has cystic fibrosis, a fatal genetic condition, and Viraj dedicates his life to her demanding medical care. Whenever Mahi inquires about her absent mother, Viraj avoids the topic. Upset by his evasion, Mahi runs away from home with Pluto. A woman named Yashna rescues them from a potential traffic accident. At Mahi's pleading, Yashna invites Viraj to a restaurant, where she and Mahi convince him to tell the story of Mahi's mother, Varsha. To make the story easier for herself, Mahi imagines Yashna as Varsha as Viraj narrates the story.

A young Viraj meets Varsha in Coonoor. Disillusioned by her parents' bitter divorce, Varsha is initially closed off to love, but she eventually overcomes her fears and marries Viraj despite her mother's fierce objections. Though they initially struggle financially, they are happy. As Viraj's photography career takes off, he expresses a desire for a child. A hesitant Varsha eventually agrees, but their joy turns to profound sorrow when Mahi is born with a chronic illness. Devastated, Varsha suffers a breakdown, blames Viraj for the situation, and openly regrets their marriage. Hearing this, an upset Mahi asks her father to stop the story. Privately, a visibly emotional Yashna urges Viraj to finish. Viraj then reveals that shortly after Varsha's breakdown, the couple met with a severe car accident, leading Yashna to assume Varsha died in the crash.

In a plot twist, it is revealed that Yashna is actually Varsha. She survived the car crash but developed retrograde amnesia, completely forgetting her past, her marriage, and her child. Her manipulative mother lied to Viraj, claiming Yashna wanted a divorce and hated him, while forcing Viraj to stay away under the pretense that any reminders of his family would further traumatize her daughter. Crushed but deeply loving, Viraj chose to raise Mahi alone. Pluto's earlier recognition of Yashna was what initially led to their chance reunion. To shield Yashna from the trauma of her forgotten past, Viraj altered key details during his restaurant narration, such as changing Yashna's sister into a brother. Meanwhile, Yashna is currently engaged to Dr. Aravind, the neurosurgeon who treated her after the accident.

Hoping to avoid further emotional complications, Viraj abruptly takes Mahi and Pluto to Goa. However, Mahi secretly invites Yashna, and the three reconnect. Yashna finds herself instinctively drawn to Viraj and Mahi, eventually falling in love with Viraj all over again. On Yashna's wedding day to Aravind, Mahi learns the truth about Yashna from the latter's mother, who warns her to stay away from her.

Doubting the narrative that Viraj's wife would willingly walk away from her family, Yashna abandons her wedding ceremony. She rushes to the hospital where Mahi, having suffered a sudden health crisis, is fighting for her life. Later, Mahi's grandfather, who is actually Yashna's estranged father confronts his wife, pointing out that Viraj raised Mahi selflessly and asserting that Viraj and Yashna belong together. Supported by Aravind and his medical team, the doctors prepare Mahi for emergency lung surgery. Before the operation, Yashna promises Mahi that she will stay by her side to teach her a song. As she bonds with Viraj, Yashna wishes that she had been the one to meet him in Coonoor and become Mahi's mother, completely contrasting the regret she expressed before her amnesia. A flash-forward reveals a grown-up, healthy Mahi singing onstage the very song taught to her by Yashna, confirming the surgery's success and symbolising the permanent reunion of the family.

== Cast ==
- Nani as Viraj: Varsha's husband; Mahi's father.
- Mrunal Thakur as Yashna / Varsha (Voice by Chinmayi Sripaada): Viraj's wife; Mahi's mother.
- Kiara Khanna as Mahi: Viraj and Varsha's daughter
  - Ritika Nayak in a cameo appearance as adult Mahi
- Jayaram as Varsha and Neha's father; Viraj's father-in-law and Mahi's grandfather
- Priyadarshi Pulikonda as Justin: Viraj's friend
- Nassar as Dr. Ranjan
- Angad Bedi as Dr. Aravind Bhatia: Yashna’s fiancé (Voice dubbed by Vedala Hemachandra)
- Shilpa Tulaskar as Varsha and Neha’s mother; Viraj's mother-in-law and Mahi's grandmother
- Viraj Ashwin as Dr. Ashok Bhatia: Aravind’s brother
- Drishty Talwar as Neha: Varsha’s sister
- Shruti Haasan in a cameo appearance as a model
- Neha Sharma in a cameo appearance as a model

== Production ==
=== Development ===
On 1 January 2023, Vyra Entertainment announced their maiden production film, with Nani and Mrunal Thakur as cast and debut director Shouryuv, music and background score composer Hesham Abdul Wahab, cinematographer Sanu Varghese, editor Praveen Anthony, and art director Jothish Shankar as crew. It was tentatively titled Nani 30. The film marks Thakur's second Telugu film after Sita Ramam (2022). In late March, Angad Bedi was announced as being a part of the cast in his debut Telugu film. In late April, it was reported that Shruti Haasan was going to be a part of the cast. On 13 July, the title Hi Nanna was revealed. Nani reportedly received ₹22 crore (US$2.3 million) as remuneration.

=== Filming ===
Principal photography began in February 2023, with the first schedule in Hyderabad. The second schedule commenced in Mumbai. The schedule was concluded by 31 May. The third schedule was filmed in Ramoji Film City. Thakur wrapped up her portions for the schedule by 27 July. The fourth schedule commenced on 2 September in Coonoor. The schedule reportedly featured a song sequence.

== Music ==
The music and background score is composed by Hesham Abdul Wahab in his maiden collaboration with Shouryuv and Nani. The audio rights were acquired by T-Series. The tracks "Samayama", "Gaaju Bomma", "Ammadi", "Odiyamma," and "Idhe Idhe" were released as singles before the full 10-song album on 18 December 2023. Wahab re-recorded the film's background score using artificial intelligence thereby becoming possibly the first Indian film to do so. The BGM "Silent Conversations" is based on Raga Reethigowla, and became a huge hit too.

== Release ==
=== Theatrical ===
Hi Nanna had a worldwide theatrical release on 7 December 2023, along with dubbed versions in Tamil, Malayalam, Kannada and Hindi. The film was initially scheduled to release on 21 December 2023, but was later moved to 7 December 2023 in order to avoid clash with Salaar and Dunki.

=== Home media ===
The digital streaming and satellite rights of the film were sold for ₹37 crore (US$3.8 million) to Netflix. The film was made available on Netflix in January 2024 in Telugu, along with dubbed versions of Tamil, Hindi (Hi Papa), Kannada and Malayalam. It released along with the movie Extra Ordinary Man.

== Reception ==
=== Critical response ===
Hi Nanna received highly positive reviews from critics. The film was applauded for its direction, screenplay, cast performances, and music. On the review aggregator website Rotten Tomatoes, 100% of 7 critics' reviews are positive, with an average rating of 6.7/10.

Deccan Herald gave the film 4/5 stars describing it as "an endearing tale of love and resilience", while also praising its cinematography, music and fresh take on storytelling. Paul Nicodemus of The Times of India gave it 3.5/5 stars and wrote, "Hi Nanna is a must-watch for those seeking a blend of heart and soul in cinema." Raghu Bandi of The Indian Express gave it 3/5 stars and wrote "Nani and Mrunal Thakur star in a high-emotion drama that will remind you of actor's Jersey."

Neeshitha Nyayapati of Hindustan Times wrote, "Shouryuv’s debut film is an emotional drama that’ll tug at your heart, both with its performances and storyline." Sangeetha Devi Dundoo of The Hindu wrote, "Shouryuv’s drama is a breather amid larger-than-life action entertainers." Ram Venkat Srikar of Film Companion wrote "Hi Nanna makes up for its weaker parts with some super strong emotional moments and even after not being convinced with it in certain aspects, it's a story that's largely satisfying on the emotional level."

== Accolades ==
| Award (Note: Awards, festivals and organizations are in alphabetical order.) | Date of ceremony (Note: Date is linked to the article about the awards held that year, wherever possible.) | Category | Recipient(s) | Result | Ref. |
|---|---|---|---|---|---|
| Filmfare Awards South | 3 August 2024 | Best Film – Telugu | Mohan Cherukuri, Murthy K. S. and Vijender Reddy Teegala | Nominated | |
| Filmfare Awards South | 3 August 2024 | Best Director – Telugu | Shouryuv | Nominated | |
| Filmfare Awards South | 3 August 2024 | Best Actor – Telugu | Nani | Nominated | |
| Filmfare Awards South | 3 August 2024 | Best Actress – Telugu | Mrunal Thakur | Nominated | |
| Filmfare Awards South | 3 August 2024 | Best Music Director – Telugu | Hesham Abdul Wahab | Nominated | |
| Filmfare Awards South | 3 August 2024 | Best Lyricist – Telugu | Anantha Sriram ("Gaaju Bomma") | Nominated | |
| Filmfare Awards South | 3 August 2024 | Best Male Playback Singer – Telugu | Anurag Kulkarni ("Samayama") | Nominated | |
| Filmfare Awards South | 3 August 2024 | Best Female Playback Singer – Telugu | Chinmayi Sripaada ("Odiyamma") | Nominated | |
| Filmfare Awards South | 3 August 2024 | Best Female Playback Singer – Telugu | Shakthisree Gopalan ("Ammaadi") | Nominated | |
| Filmfare Awards South | 3 August 2024 | Best Debut Director | Shouryuv | Won | |
| South Indian International Movie Awards | 14 September 2024 | Best Film – Telugu | Mohan Cherukuri, Murthy K. S. and Vijender Reddy Teegala | Nominated | |
| South Indian International Movie Awards | 14 September 2024 | Best Actress – Telugu | Mrunal Thakur | Nominated | |
| South Indian International Movie Awards | 14 September 2024 | Best Actress Critics - Telugu | Mrunal Thakur | Won | |
| South Indian International Movie Awards | 14 September 2024 | Best Supporting Actor – Telugu | Angad Bedi | Nominated | |
| South Indian International Movie Awards | 14 September 2024 | Best Supporting Actress – Telugu | Kiara Khanna | Won | |
| South Indian International Movie Awards | 14 September 2024 | Best Debut Director – Telugu | Shouryuv | Won | |
| South Indian International Movie Awards | 14 September 2024 | Best Debut Producer – Telugu | Mohan Cherukuri, Murthy K. S. and Vijender Reddy Teegala | Won | |
| South Indian International Movie Awards | 14 September 2024 | Best Music Director – Telugu | Hesham Abdul Wahab | Won | |
| South Indian International Movie Awards | 14 September 2024 | Best Lyricist – Telugu | Krishna Kanth ("Adigaa") | Nominated | |
| South Indian International Movie Awards | 14 September 2024 | Best Male Playback Singer – Telugu | Anurag Kulkarni ("Samayama") | Nominated | |
| South Indian International Movie Awards | 14 September 2024 | Best Female Playback Singer – Telugu | Shakthisree Gopalan ("Ammaadi") | Won | |
| IIFA Utsavam | 27 September 2024 | Best Actress – Telugu | Mrunal Thakur | Won | |
| IIFA Utsavam | 27 September 2024 | Best Music Director – Telugu | Hesham Abdul Wahab | Won | |
