= Once Upon a Time in Kochi =

- Theatrical release poster
- Directed by: Nadirshah
- Written by: Rafi
- Produced by: Kalandoor
- Starring: Arjun Ashokan; Devika Sanjay; Mubin Rafi; Shine Tom Chacko
- Cinematography: Shaji Kumar
- Edited by: Shameer Muhammed
- Music by: Songs: Nadirsha; Hesham Abdul Wahab; Background Score: Hesham Abdul Wahab
- Production company: Kalandoor Entertainments
- Release date: 31 May 2024
- Running time: 141 minutes
- Country: India
- Language: Malayalam

Once Upon a Time in Kochi is a 2024 Indian Malayalam language comedy film written by Raffi and directed by Nadirshah featuring Arjun Ashokan, Devika Sanjay, Mubin Rafi, Shine Tom Chacko, Johny Antony and Baiju Santhosh as the lead characters. The film was released on 31 May 2024.

== Premise ==
The film focuses on people who come out at night and get involved in wrongdoing.

== Cast ==
- Mubin Rafi as Habibi
- Arjun Ashokan as SI Anand Das
- Devika Sanjay as Janaki Jayan
- Shine Tom Chacko as Ram Kumar
- Shivajith as Vinod
- Jaffar Idukki as Chandrappan
- Baiju Santhosh as DYSP Cylex Abraham
- Johny Antony as Jayan, Janaki's father
- Raffi as Ustad

== Soundtrack ==
Once Upon a Time in Kochi

Soundtrack album by Hesham Abdul Wahab, Nadirshah
- Released: 2024
- Genre: Feature film soundtrack
- Length: 12:43
- Language: Malayalam
- Label: Millennium Audios
External audio
- Once Upon a Time in Kochi – Jukebox on YouTube

The songs were composed by Hesham Abdul Wahab, and Nadirshah.

Track listing
| No. | Title | Lyrics | Music | Singer(s) | Length |
|---|---|---|---|---|---|
| 1. | "Kande Njan Akashathoru" | Suhail Koya | Hesham Abdul Wahab | Hesham Abdul Wahab | 4:35 |
| 2. | "Pande Pande" | B. K. Harinarayanan | Hesham Abdul Wahab | Sithara Krishnakumar; Vidhu Prathap | 2:27 |
| 3. | "Thooval Nilaa" | B. K. Harinarayanan | Nadirshah | Harisankar, Dana Razik | 2:34 |
| 4. | "Zinda Song (Halloween Song)" | Kunwar Juneja | Hesham Abdul Wahab | Samad | 3:07 |
| Total length: | | | | | 12:43 |

== Reception ==
Rohit Panikker of Times Now rated the film three out of five stars and wrote, "Once Upon A Time In Kochi is an attempt at trying to tell something new using extremely outdated narrative tropes. It starts out interesting, but tapers out into something usual and predictable. Some performances that could have stood out are let down by poor writing." Arjun Ramachandran of The South First gave it two-and-a-half out of five stars and noted that "Director Nadirshah's latest outing lacks the soul and elements needed for commercial cinema and offers nothing new."

Vignesh Madhu of The New Indian Express gave it one out of five stars and wrote, "First things first, it seems like the makers were unsure of how to treat the film. Once Upon a Time In Kochi is neither a comedy nor a thriller. The film being unintentionally funny throughout, it would have been more effective as a full-fledged dark comedy." S. R. Praveen of The Hindu wrote, "Once Upon a Time in Kochi is a rather forgettable attempt at creating a ‘comedy thriller’ given how none of its attempts at being funny or thrilling manage to work."
