= Hesham Abdul Wahab =

Indian music composer and producer (born 1990)

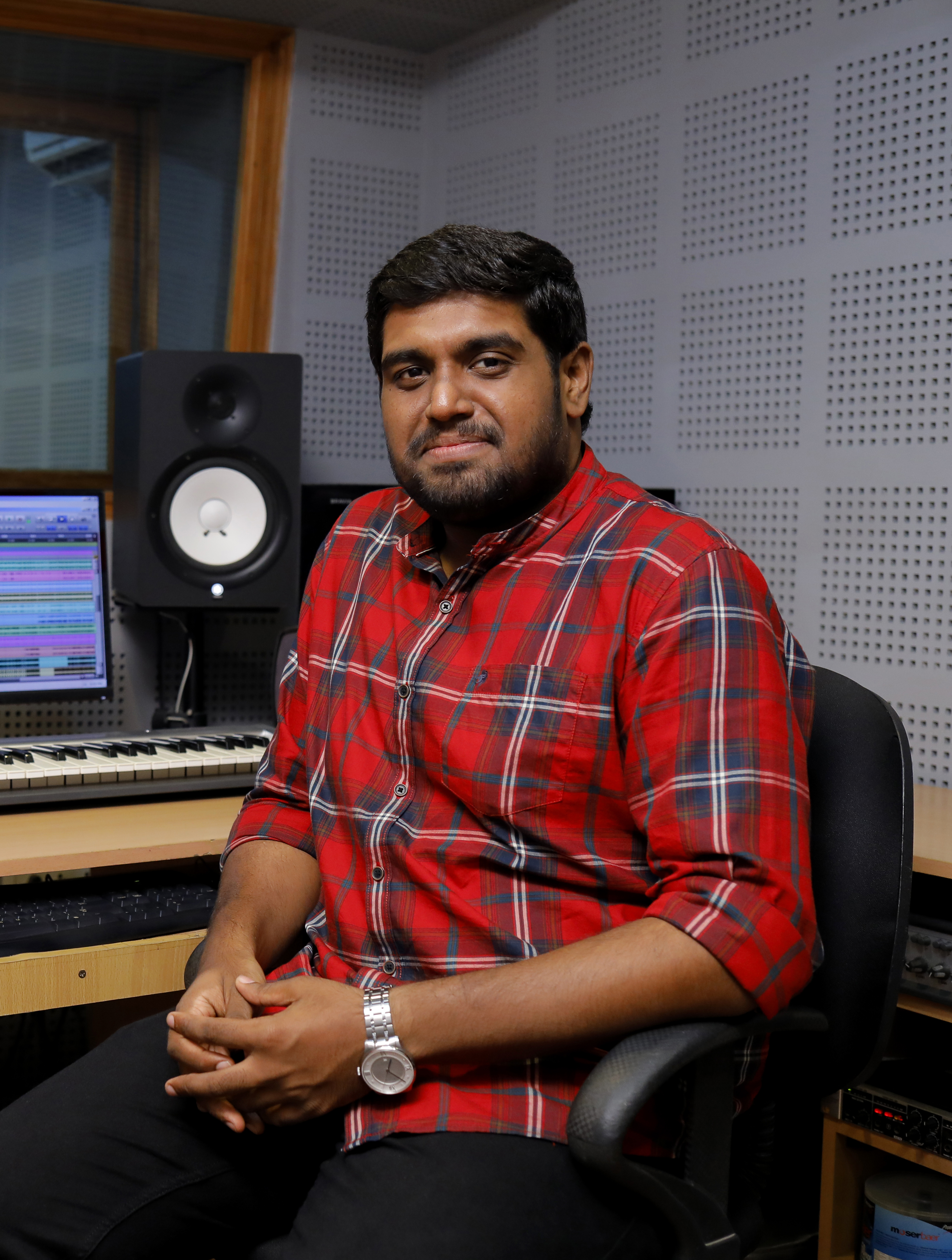
- Abdul Wahab in 2018

Background information
- Born: Sayyed Hesham Abdul Wahab; 14 October 1990 (age 36); Alappuzha, India
- Occupations: Music director; music producer; singer; audio engineer; mixing engineer
- Years active: 2007–present
- Spouse: Ayshath Safa (m. 2018)
- Musical career
- Genres: Film score; World music; Sufi music
- Instruments: Keyboard, piano, vocals
- Labels: Think Music; Saregama; T-Series

Sayyed Hesham Abdul Wahab (born 14 October 1990) is an Indian music composer, music producer and singer who predominantly works in Malayalam and Telugu cinema. He is best known for the compositions of Qadam Badha (2015), Hridayam (2022), Kushi (2023) and Hi Nanna (2023). He is the recipient of a Kerala State Film Award, SIIMA Award, and IIFA Award for music direction.

== Early life ==
Sayyed Hesham Abdul Wahab hails from Alappuzha and was raised in Riyadh, Saudi Arabia, in a family of musicians. His mother tongue is Malayalam, and his family traces its origins to Alappuzha. He developed an interest in music at a young age and received professional training in Carnatic and Hindustani classical music. He began singing at the age of eight and was introduced to the piano at eleven.

After completing his schooling at the International Indian School in Riyadh, Wahab earned a diploma in audio engineering and a Bachelor of Arts degree in audio production from SAE Institute, graduating with top honors.

Wahab married Ayshath Safa on 22 January 2018.

== Career ==
=== Early career ===
Hesham left Saudi Arabia for India in 2007 to be part of the music reality show Idea Star Singer which paved the way for his foray into playback singing and later composing.

=== Recording career ===
Wahab's first recording project was in 2013 with his first single Meri Dua produced by Offline Creations. He got his first major break when Andante Records signed him for their record label. His first album Qadam Badha (Step Forward), an amalgamation of Sufi music and World Music produced by eminent Iran-born British singer-songwriter Sami Yusuf was released in 2015.

=== Music composing ===
Wahab forayed into Malayalam film industry as a music director in 2013, with the film Salt Mango Tree. His debut as a music composer for the Bollywood film Mera India was set to release in 2019. He has also worked with several noted composers and lent his voice to many Indian films. In 2018, his song Jaana Meri Janaa from the film Cappuccino fetched Vineeth Sreenivasan his second SIIMA Award for the Best Playback Singer in Malayalam.

In 2018, Wahab founded LIVEwithMUSIC, an independent music academy where he takes classes on sound production. Hesham arranged and mixed filmmaker Alphonse Puthren's debut composition Kathakal Chollidaam which was released as a music video featuring several Malayalam film actors and their children. He composed the soundtrack of Vineeth Sreenivasan's film Hridayam, which consists of 15 songs. He has since composed music for other Malayalam films, including Madhura Manohara Moham (2023), and Sesham Mike-il Fathima (2023).

Wahab made his Telugu composing debut with the romantic comedy Kushi (2023) and went on to compose music for the Telugu romance films Hi Nanna (2023) and Manamey (2024).

In 2025, Wahab created the musical score for Kerala Crime Files: Season 2, the sequel to the popular Malayalam TV series. His work on the series was well received by critics and audiences alike. Sajin Shrijith of The Week wrote that "Hesham Abdul Wahab's music evokes the necessary emotions in the right places without trying to force them out of us". He also composed the soundtrack for the Malayalam film Samshayam directed by Rajesh Ravi. The same year, it was announced that he would make his Kannada cinema composing debut for an untitled film directed by Srinivas Raju and starring Ganesh.

In 2026, Wahab made his Hindi film debut with the romantic drama Do Deewane Seher Mein, for which he composed the song "Aasma Aasma".

== Discography ==
Year	Title	Songs	Score	Language	Notes	Ref
2015	Salt Mango Tree	Yes	No	Malayalam		
2017	Cappuccino	Yes	No	Malayalam	5 songs	
2017	Pretham Undu Sookshikkuka	Yes	Yes	Malayalam	4 songs	
2018	Angane Njanum Premichu	Yes	Yes	Malayalam	5 songs	
2018	Marubhoomiyile Mazhathullikal	Yes	Yes	Malayalam	2 songs	
2019	Mohabbathin Kunjabdulla	Yes	No	Malayalam	2 songs	
2022	Ole Kanda Naal	Yes	Yes	Malayalam	3 songs	
2022	Varthamanam	Yes	No	Malayalam	1 song	
2022	Aanaparambile World Cup	Yes	No	Malayalam	1 song	
2022	Cabin	Yes	Yes	Malayalam	2 songs	
2022	Chuzhal	Yes	Yes	Malayalam		
2022	Madhuram	Yes	No	Malayalam		
2022	Hridayam	Yes	Yes	Malayalam		
2022	Mike	Yes	Yes	Malayalam		
2022	Ini Utharam	Yes	Yes	Malayalam		
2023	Madhura Manohara Moham	Yes	Yes	Malayalam		
2023	Kushi	Yes	Yes	Telugu		
2023	Sesham Mike-il Fathima	Yes	Yes	Malayalam		
2023	Spark Life	Yes	Yes	Telugu		
2023	Philip's	Yes	Yes	Malayalam		
2023	Hi Nanna	Yes	Yes	Telugu		
2024	Once Upon a Time in Kochi	Yes	Yes	Malayalam		
2024	Manamey	Yes	Yes	Telugu		
2025	Maaman	Yes	Yes	Tamil		
2025	Samshayam	Yes	Yes	Malayalam		
2025	8 Vasantalu	Yes	Yes	Telugu		
2025	The Girlfriend	Yes	No	Telugu		
2026	Do Deewane Seher Mein	Yes	No	Hindi	1 song	
2026	Lucky the Superstar	Yes	No	Tamil		
2026	Made in Korea	Yes	Yes	Tamil		
2026	Madhuvidhu	Yes	Yes	Malayalam		
2026	Once More	Yes	Yes	Tamil		
2026	Epic	Yes	Yes	Telugu		
2026	Brindavihari †	Yes	Yes	Kannada		
TBA	Superhero †	Yes	Yes	Tamil		
TBA	Untitled Vijay Devarakonda-Shouryuv film †	Yes	Yes	Telugu		

=== TV series ===
- Kerala Crime Files (2023–2025) (season 1–2)

=== Studio albums ===
- Qadam Badha (2015)

=== Music videos ===
- Meri Dua (2013)
- Mothirakkallu (2019)
- Await (2020)
- Yatra (2020)
- Mounam (2021)
- Tribute to World Cup Football (2022)

=== As playback singer ===
Year	Song	Film/Album	Composer	Language
2009	Panivizhum Kaalama	Pattalam	Jassie Gift	Tamil
2011	Kannerinjal	Traffic	Mejo Joseph	Malayalam
2011	Ladki	The Train	Sreenivas	Malayalam
2011	Vidhuramee Yatra	Gaddama	Bennet–Veetraag	Malayalam
2013	Thaazhvaaram	Thira	Shaan Rahman	Malayalam
2014	Mounam Chorum, Sneham Cherum	Ohm Shanthi Oshaana	Shaan Rahman	Malayalam
2015	Jeevanil	Swargathekkal Sundaram	Rakesh Keshav	Malayalam
2015	Kattummel, Kanavil	Salt Mango Tree	Hesham Abdul Wahab	Malayalam
2016	Are Thu Chakkar	Valleem Thetti Pulleem Thetti	Sooraj S Kurup	Malayalam
2016	Ethu Meghamaari	Kochavva Paulo Ayyappa Coelho	Shaan Rahman	Malayalam
2016	Pulkodiyil	Take Off	Shaan Rahman	Malayalam
2017	Thumbikal Thaalam Thullum	Chicken Kokkachi	Jassie Gift	Malayalam
2017	Ente Bharatham	Ente Bharatham	Binesh Mani	Malayalam
2018	Oru Thee Pole	Aadu 2	Shaan Rahman	Malayalam
2018	Snehithano	Angane Njanum Premichu	Hesham Abdul Wahab	Malayalam
2018	Swapnam Swargam	Padayottam	Prashant Pillai	Malayalam
2018	Kannoram	Marubhoomiyile Mazhathullikal	Hesham Abdul Wahab	Malayalam
2019	Maahiya	Oru Adaar Love	Shaan Rahman	Malayalam
2019	Manushya Nee	Kalippu	Anaz Sainudeen	Malayalam
2019	Safarnama	Muhabbathin Kunjabdulla	Hesham Abdul Wahab	Malayalam
2019	Mere Maula	Pranaya Meenukalude Kadal	Shaan Rahman	Malayalam
2021	Zindagi	Varthamanam	Hesham Abdul Wahab	Malayalam
2021	Chollamo	Ole Kanda Naal	Hesham Abdul Wahab	Malayalam
2021	Darshana	Hridayam	Hesham Abdul Wahab	Malayalam
2022	Kumkumamaake	Brahmāstra (Malayalam)	Pritam	Malayalam
2023	Doore Oru Mukilin	Aromalinte Aadhyathe Pranayam	Charles Simon	Malayalam
2023	Na Roja Nuvve	Kushi	Hesham Abdul Wahab	Telugu
2023	En Rojaa Neeye	Kushi	Hesham Abdul Wahab	Tamil
2023	Nanna Roja Neene	Kushi	Hesham Abdul Wahab	Kannada
2023	En Rojaa Neeye	Kushi	Hesham Abdul Wahab	Malayalam
2023	Kushi Title Song	Kushi	Hesham Abdul Wahab	Telugu
2023	Kushi Title Song	Kushi	Hesham Abdul Wahab	Hindi
2023	Yedhaki Oka Gaayam	Kushi	Hesham Abdul Wahab	Telugu
2023	Gaaju Bomma	Hi Nanna	Hesham Abdul Wahab	Telugu
2023	Idhe Idhe	Hi Nanna	Hesham Abdul Wahab	Telugu
2023	Kannaadi Kannaadi	Hi Nanna	Hesham Abdul Wahab	Tamil
2023	Anbe Anbe	Hi Nanna	Hesham Abdul Wahab	Tamil
2023	Magalalla	Hi Nanna	Hesham Abdul Wahab	Kannada
2023	Idhe Idhe	Hi Nanna	Hesham Abdul Wahab	Kannada
2023	Konjathe Konjathe	Hi Nanna	Hesham Abdul Wahab	Malayalam
2023	Penne Penne	Hi Nanna	Hesham Abdul Wahab	Malayalam
2023	Sheeshe Ki Gudiya	Hi Papa	Hesham Abdul Wahab	Hindi
2023	Pehle Pehle	Hi Papa	Hesham Abdul Wahab	Hindi
2023	Idhi Idhi Maaya	Spark L.I.F.E	Hesham Abdul Wahab	Telugu
2023	Gnapakaalu	Spark L.I.F.E	Hesham Abdul Wahab	Telugu
2023	Thinkal Poovin	Pachuvum Athbutha Vilakkum	Justin Prabhakaran	Malayalam
2023	Ushaa Kiraname	Vela	Sam C. S.	Malayalam
2023	Sadhaa	Philip's	Hesham Abdul Wahab	Malayalam
2023	Niraye	Philip's	Hesham Abdul Wahab	Malayalam
2023	Ninne Kandannu	Qalb	Prakash Alex	Malayalam
2023	Malarthan Vizhundhadhu	Aneethi	G. V. Prakash Kumar	Tamil
2024	Njaanaalunna	Varshangalkku Shesham	Amrit Ramnath	Malayalam
2024	Kande Njaan Aakashathoru	Once Upon a Time in Kochi	Hesham Abdul Wahab	Malayalam
2024	Aazhithiramaala	Pushpaka Vimanam	Rahul Raj	Malayalam
2025	Andhamaa Andhamaa	8 Vasantalu	Hesham Abdul Wahab	Telugu
2025	Cheleya	Written and Directed by God	Shaan Rahman	Malayalam
2025	Naadaaya Naadaake, Orkkaathe Ullam	Samshayam	Hesham Abdul Wahab	Malayalam
2025	Mari Mari	Santhana Prapthirasthu	Sunil Kashyap	Telugu
2025	Kannodili Kalanodili	12A Railway Colony	Bheems Ceciroleo	Telugu
2025	Dhoore Dhikkile	Dhurandhar (Malayalam)	Shashwat Sachdev	Malayalam

=== As actor ===
Year	Title	Role	Language
2024	Varshangalkku Shesham	Playback Singer (cameo appearance)	Malayalam

== Awards and nominations ==
- 2015 – Best Music Director – Kairali Cultural Forum Abu Dhabi – Short Film Festival – Oru Vappichi Katha
- 2015 – Best Upcoming Music Composer of the Year – Mirchi Music Awards South – Salt Mango Tree
- 2016 – Best Singer – Ramu Kariat Award – "Kattummel" (Salt Mango Tree)
- 2021 – Kerala State Film Award for Best Music Director – Hridayam
- 2021 – Kerala Film Critics Association Award for Best Music Director – Hridayam
- 2022 – Best Song – Mazhavil Music Awards – "Darshana" (Hridayam)
- 2024 – Nominated – Filmfare Award for Best Music Director – Telugu – Hi Nanna and Kushi
- 2024 – SIIMA Award for Best Music Director – Telugu – Hi Nanna and Kushi
- 2024 – IIFA Award for Best Music Director – Telugu – Hi Nanna
