= Kushi (2023 film) =

Indian film by Shiva Nirvana

- Theatrical release poster
- Directed by: Shiva Nirvana
- Written by: Shiva Nirvana
- Produced by: Naveen Yerneni; Yalamanchili Ravi Shankar
- Starring: Vijay Devarakonda; Samantha
- Cinematography: Murali G.
- Edited by: Prawin Pudi
- Music by: Hesham Abdul Wahab
- Production company: Mythri Movie Makers
- Release date: 1 September 2023
- Running time: 165 minutes
- Country: India
- Language: Telugu
- Budget: ₹70 crore
- Box office: ₹71.95 crore

Kushi (transl. Happiness) is a 2023 Indian Telugu-language family romantic comedy film written and directed by Shiva Nirvana and produced by Mythri Movie Makers. The film stars Vijay Deverakonda and Samantha.

The film was announced in April 2022, and was tentatively titled as VD10, as it is Devarakonda's tenth lead role; the official title Kushi was announced in May. Principal photography commenced in April 2022 in Kashmir, and wrapped in July 2023. The music is composed by Hesham Abdul Wahab, while the cinematography and editing are handled by Murali G. and Prawin Pudi, respectively.

Kushi released on 1 September 2023 and opened to mixed reviews from critics. The film was an average grosser.

== Plot ==
Viplav is an employee in BSNL and the son of Lenin Sathyam. Vexed with being in the same city since his birth, he takes a transfer to Kashmir so that he can enjoy the peace and nature. After arriving in Kashmir, he notices that the reality is quite different from his expectations as there is a war going on between both sides of the line of control and a curfew being placed every other day, stopping his access to stores and restaurants. He meets up with his colleague Pitobash, with whom he also shares a room.

Unable to bear living in the present conditions of Kashmir, Viplav urges his superior Zoya to transfer him again to Hyderabad. That is when he chances upon "Aara" Begum and immediately falls in love with her. She is there with her friend to visit the Mamaleshwar Temple so that her grandmother's knee pain can be healed. When followed by Viplav, her friend gives him a false story that they are from Pakistan and are there to find Aara's younger brother Feroz who was lost in the ensuing conflicts between the two nations. Being honest and helpful in nature, Viplav helps Aara go to the temple and finds Feroz in the process, saving the siblings from a group who try to attack them. Aara eventually falls in love with Viplav as well, but she decides to go back to Pakistan without confessing her love. Viplav catches up to her at the railway station, where he discovers her true identity, Chadarangam Aaradhya. Both confess their love for each other, and they also learn that their fathers are bitter rivals.

Viplav's father Sathyam is an atheist, and Aaradhya's father, Srinivasa Rao, is a spiritual personality in Kakinada, coming from an orthodox and conservative Brahmin household; both of them had a verbal sparring when they were asked to be chief guests for a live television debate. They try to get their parents to meet each other in the Hyderabad Metro. Sathyam is receptive to Viplav's wish to marry Aradhya; however, Srinivasa Rao is skeptical, as the pair's horoscopes do not really match and foresee hardships if they marry. Hence, Viplav and Aaradhya marry against their parents' wishes even though Srinivasa Rao predicts that they will not be able to live happily and will not have children until both Viplav and Sathyam do a homam, together. The pair moves into an apartment, and their married life slowly starts to come together. On their marriage night they end up having sex. Both become good friends with Zoya and her husband Thomas. One year later, Aaradhya becomes pregnant. When she and Viplav visit the hospital, they are both informed that she has suffered a miscarriage.

Soon, they start facing problems in their marriage, with insecurity, jealousy, and behavioral problems cropping up. One day, Zoya and Thomas invite them to their daughter's birthday, where they learn that she is no more as she was a premature baby and was unable to survive for long. Zoya explains to the two that during her difficult times, Thomas has always been with her, and advises the two to be with each other during their difficult times as well. The following morning, Aaradhya decides to go back to her father's house in Kakinada as a few days ago, Viplav told her to leave him in a fit of rage. Viplav becomes disheartened and understands that he cannot live without Aaradhya. He goes to her house but is denied to meet her. He decides to do the homam that Srinivasa Rao recommended him to do and goes back to his father's house, requesting them to join him. His father, though sympathetic to his situation, turns him down as it goes against his views.

On the day of the homam, Sathyam suddenly enters the temple and says that he is ready to do any homam with Viplav as he has realized that he loves Aaradhya dearly and cannot see him becoming sad, with his views being secondary to his son's well-being. When the homam is about to be finished, it starts raining hard, and it is forced to come to a halt. Despite that, Sathyam tells Srinivasa Rao that he will not leave the temple until he finishes the homam with Viplav, whatever happens. Srinivasa Rao replies that it is not necessary anymore, as he has realized that in order to prove their points, both of them have forgotten their humanity as fathers, saying that even if it would not have rained, he would have personally stopped the homam. He says that he is happy that Viplav truly loves Aaradhya, and that is enough for him. Viplav and Aaradhya reconcile with the blessings of their parents.

In the post-credits scene, it is shown that both of them have been blessed with a baby daughter, choosing to name her as "Kushi".

== Cast ==
- Vijay Deverakonda as Viplav, Aradhya's husband
- Samantha as Aradhya "Aara" Rao / Aara Begum, Viplav's wife (Voice dubbed by Chinmayi)
- Murali Sharma as Chadarangam Srinivasa Rao, Aradhya's father
- Sachin Khedekar as Lenin Satyam, Viplav's father
- Brahmanandam in a cameo appearance as a Swami
- Vennela Kishore as Pitobash, Viplav's co-worker
- Rahul Ramakrishna as RK, Viplav's friend
- Shatru as Shanmukh, Aradhya's brother-in-law
- Saranya Ponvannan as Rajalakshmi, Viplav's mother
- Lakshmi as Aradhya's grandmother
- Rohini as Zoya, Viplav’s manager and Thomas’s Wife
- Jayaram as Thomas, Zoya's Husband
- Sharanya Pradeep as Deepu, Aradhya's friend
- Srikanth Iyengar as Chatur, Aradhya's boss
- Kanchi
- Jeevan Kumar Naidu
- Geetha Bhaskar
- Manik Reddy
- Ali in a cameo appearance as Himalayan Baba
- Siddharth Gollapudi as Soldier

== Production ==
=== Development ===
In December 2019, it was announced that Shiva Nirvana would direct Vijay Deverakonda with Dil Raju producing it under Sri Venkateswara Creations. The film was then formally launched in April 2022, under the tentative title #VD10 with Mythri Movie Makers producing the film. In May 2022, the film's title was officially revealed to be Kushi.

=== Filming ===
Principal photography commenced in April 2022, with the first schedule in Kashmir, which concluded in May. The shooting of the film took place in several places in Kashmir valley — Anantnag, Pampore railway station in Pulwama, Mamaleshwar Temple in Pahalgam and Dal Lake in Srinagar. It was also shot in Kakinada and Kerala. In May 2023, the title song of the film was filmed in Turkey.

== Music ==
The music and background score was composed by Hesham Abdul Wahab in his Telugu debut. The first single "Na Roja Nuvve" was released on 9 May 2023, followed by the second single "Aradhya" on 12 July and the third single "Kushi Title Song" on 28 July. The album was released on 15 August, at a promotional musical concert held in Hyderabad.

== Release ==
Kushi was theatrically released on 1 September 2023. It was released in Telugu along with dubbed versions in Tamil, Kannada, Malayalam and Hindi languages. The film was initially scheduled to release in December 2022 but was pushed to February 2023 following production delays. The film was then again pushed to 1 September 2023.

Worldwide theatrical rights were sold for ₹52.5 crore (US$5.5 million).

=== Home media ===
Post-theatrical streaming rights of the film were acquired by Netflix at a cost of ₹30 crore (US$3.1 million). It was premiered on Netflix from 1 October 2023.

== Reception ==
=== Critical response ===
Kushi received mixed reviews from critics.

The Hans India gave the film 3.5 out of 5 and wrote "Vijay Deverakonda is charming as usual in his role of Viplav. Samantha Ruth Prabhu, on the other hand is very beautiful in this film in both her looks in Kashmir and after their marriage.Vijay as a husband is so realistic that the couple seemingly looked very real. So, this has been one of their films with very good pairing and chemistry." Neeshita Nyayapati of The Times of India gave the film 3 out of 5 and wrote "Kushi explores the tale of a couple who get what they want, only to realise, they might not be equipped for it."

Raghu Bandi of The Indian Express gave the film 2.5 out of 5 and wrote "The writing from this stage is mostly unilateral and from the male point of view. The fights between the couple feel staged and insignificant." Janani K of India Today gave the film 2.5 out of 5 and wrote "Vijay Deverakonda, Samantha’s middling rom-com is confusing".

Priyanka Sundar of Firstpost gave the film 2 out of 5 and wrote "Kushi is a missed chance. In a country where extremists seek life in the name of love jihad, it could have really fostered love and acceptance. It could have been heart melting and mesmerizing. Instead, we have something forgettable." Sudhir Srinivasan of Cinema Express gave the film 2 out of 5 and wrote "this film about an ideological clash offers little to reflect on—and this story about dreamy-love-leading-to-marital-distress creates little emotional resonance. The strongest I felt was deep anguish… when quality non-vegetarian food—beef biryani, fish curry…—kept getting discarded at different points in the film."

Asra Mavad of Deccan Herald gave the film 1.5 out of 5 and wrote "Kushi is nothing out of the ordinary. In fact, it makes you wish it had fully leveraged its potential, instead of trying hard to be a pleasant romantic watch." Sangeetha Devi Dundoo of The Hindu wrote " The charming leads are placed in a romance drama peppered with comedy and good music and the narrative packs in plenty of references to films of Mani Ratnam, and even Vijay and Samantha."

=== Box office ===
Kushi had an opening of ₹16 crore on first day. After a week (7 days) of its release, Kushi has collected a worldwide gross of ₹71.95 crore (US$7.5 million), with a distributors' share of ₹38.3 crore (US$4.0 million). In the overseas, Kushi earned $1 million in the US within just two days of its release. The film was a box-office bomb, with a loss of over ₹12 crore (US$1.2 million).
