= Kashmira Pardeshi =

Indian actress and model

- Born: November 3, 1997 (age 28); Pune, Maharashtra, India
- Education: St. Anne's School, Pune; National Institute of Fashion Technology, Mumbai
- Occupations: Actress; Model
- Years active: 2018–present
- Known for: Rampaat (2019) - as Munni; Mission Mangal (2019) - as Anya Shinde; Rider (2021) - as Sowmya "Chinnu"; Varalaru Mukkiyam (2022) - as Yamuna; The Freelancer - as Aleeya Khan; Glory (TV series) - as Bharti
- Works: Full list
- Height: 1.65 m (5 ft 5 in)
- Parents: Mahendra Pardeshi (father); Swati Pardeshi (mother)
- Awards: Filmfare Marathi Award — Best Female Debut (Rampaat, 2019) (nomination)
- Website: Kashmira Pardeshi on Instagram

Kashmira Pardeshi is an Indian actress who primarily works in Tamil and Telugu language films. She made her Telugu acting debut with the film Nartanasala (2018), Tamil with Sivappu Manjal Pachai (2019), and Hindi with Mission Mangal (2019). She made her digital streaming debut through the Hindi series The Freelancer (2023).

== Personal life ==
Pardeshi hails from a Marathi family.

She attended St. Anne's School in Pune and Brihan Maharashtra College of Commerce. She studied fashion design at National Institute of Fashion Technology in Mumbai.

== Career ==
Pardeshi acted in several commercials before she made her film debut with the Telugu film Nartanasala (2018), opposite Naga Shaurya. The film was a commercial failure at the box-office, but her performance in it earned her a role in the Hindi film Mission Mangal (2019), where she was cast as Vidya Balan and Sanjay Kapoor's daughter. The film was a major commercial success at the box-office. In the same year, she made her Marathi film debut with Ravi Jadhav's Rampaat. The director Sasi came across her advertisements and her performance in Nartanasala, and signed her up for the Tamil film Sivappu Manjal Pachai, opposite G.V. Prakash Kumar. Pardeshi hired a Tamil tutor to help her prepare for the role. The film was a hit at the box office.

Her only release on 2021 was Rider, marking her debut in Kannada cinema, opposite Nikhil Kumar. The film received generally positive reviews from critics and audience, and was a decent hit at the box-office.

In 2022, Pardeshi's first release was Anbarivu, opposite Hip Hop Tamizha. The film released directly via Disney+ Hotstar, with receiving mixed to positive reviews from critics. Anbarivu was declared as a commercially successful film on an OTT platform. Her last release was Varalaru Mukkiyam, opposite Jiiva. The film received negative reviews from critics and audience, but Pardeshi's performance as a "Malayali girl" was appreciated. The film was a flop at the box-office.

In 2023, Pardeshi's first release was Vasantha Mullai, opposite Bobby Simha; the film received poor reviews from critics and audiences, and was a box-office bomb. Her second release was a Telugu film, Vinaro Bhagyamu Vishnu Katha, opposite Kiran Abbavaram. It received mixed reviews from critics and audience alike upon its released, and was successful at the box-office. Later she made her digital streaming debut with the Hindi language series The Freelancer, which was premiered on Disney+ Hotstar. The series received highly positive reviews from critics, and she was praised for her performance. Her next release was Paramporul, alongside Amitash Pradhan and Sarath Kumar. The film received general reviews from critics and audiences, and was an average grosser at the box-office.

In 2024, Pardeshi's first release was the Tamil film PT Sir, opposite Hip Hop Adhi, marking her second collobration with him after Anbarivu (2022). The film received mixed reviews from critics and audiences and was a box-office success.

== Filmography ==
Key
†	Denotes films that have not yet been released

List of films and roles
Year	Title	Role(s)	Language(s)	Notes	Ref.
2018	Nartanasala	Manasa	Telugu		
2019	Rampaat	Munni	Marathi		
2019	Mission Mangal	Anya Shinde	Hindi		
2019	Sivappu Manjal Pachai	Kavin	Tamil		
2021	Rider	Sowmya "Chinnu"	Kannada		
2022	Anbarivu	Dr. Kayal	Tamil		
2022	Varalaru Mukkiyam	Yamuna	Tamil		
2023	Vasantha Mullai	Nila	Tamil		
2023	Vinaro Bhagyamu Vishnu Katha	Darshana	Telugu		
2023	Paramporul	Yamini	Tamil		
2024	PT Sir	Vaanathi	Tamil		

=== Web series ===
List of web series and roles
Year	Title	Role(s)	Language(s)	Notes	Ref.
2023	The Freelancer	Aleeya Khan / Sonia Shah / Rukhsaar Ahmed	Hindi	Disney+ Hotstar	
2026	Glory	Bharti	Hindi	Netflix	
