= Irumudi (soundtrack) =

2026 film soundtrack album

Soundtrack album by G. V. Prakash Kumar
- Released: 20 August 2026
- Recorded: 2026
- Genre: Feature film soundtrack
- Length: 19:22
- Language: Telugu
- Label: T-Series
- Producer: G. V. Prakash Kumar

G. V. Prakash Kumar chronology
Vishwanath & Sons (2026)	Irumudi (2026)	Mandaadi (2026)

Singles from Irumudi
- 1. "Irumudi Kattu" Released: 29 June 2026; 2. "Yaalalo Yaalalo" Released: 3 August 2026; 3. "Mallepoola Pallaki" Released: 17 August 2026

Irumudi is the soundtrack album composed by G. V. Prakash Kumar to the 2026 Indian Telugu-language action drama film of the same name written and directed by Shiva Nirvana starring Ravi Teja, Priya Bhavani Shankar, P. Sai Kumar and Baby Nakshatra. The album featured five tracks with lyrics written by Anantha Sriram, Kalyan Chakravarthy, Chowdam Srinivasa Rao and Shiva himself. Led by three singles, the album was released on 20 August 2026 under the T-Series label.

== Background ==
The film score and soundtrack is composed by G. V. Prakash Kumar in his first collaboration with Shiva Nirvana; second with Ravi Teja after Tiger Nageswara Rao (2023). Shiva stated that he has been an admirer of Prakash's music during his college period and when he collaborated with him for this project, he demanded a raw, earthy and rustic tone for the film. Prakash also added that he wanted to capture the geography of the film right because of the rootedness in native and tribal elements and utilized folk and tribal instrumentation while also leaning on spiritual music.

Besides the spritiual and rural backdrop, the film is also focusing on the emotional bond between a father and daughter. Prakash added that his experiences as a father helped him to deliver the melodic and poignant score that undermines their relationship. Shiva also wrote lyrics for two of the songs, and also being instrumental in the music discussions. Prakash said that Nirvana insisted him to record vocals for "Karthika Maasam" and made him re-record the entire track two days before the film's release to match with the lyrics. Prakash said that he created a psychological musical score for the film by blending various genres like devotion, psychology, action, crime and emotion which he considered to be challenging.

The soundtrack also accompanied devotional songs and bhajans in praise of the Hindu deity Ayyappan and also featured Tamil and Malayalam lyrics. Prakash also re-created the devotional number "Mallepoola Pallaki" (1990) originally composed by Sunkara Anjaneyulu and written by Chowdam Srinivasa Rao, and had vocals by the original singer Dappu Srinu. There were certain criticisms regarding Srinu's voice did not match the original song that came twenty six years ago. In defense, Shiva claimed that Srinu was 63 years old as of now and it is natural for singer's voice to be changed according to their age. He further added that Prakash and team insisted on Srinu to sing the song so that it could respect the sentiments of the devotees and those who liked the original song. Shiva paid ₹10 lakh (US$10,000) to Srinu as renumeration.

The Tamil version of the album featured lyrics written by Balaji Venugopal, Yugabharathi and Vignesh Ramakrishna.

== Release ==
The first single "Irumudi Kattu" was released on 29 June 2026. The second single "Yaalalo Yaalalo" was released on 3 August. The third single, a recreation of "Mallepoola Pallaki" was released on 17 August at a pre-release event held at Shilpakala Vedika in Hyderabad. The album was released on 20 August, a day prior to the film's release.

== Track listing ==
Irumudi (Telugu)
No.	Title	Lyrics	Singer(s)	Length
1.	"Irumudi Kattu"	Shiva Nirvana, Kalyan Chakravarthy	Ananthu	4:10
2.	"Yaalalo Yaalalo"	Anantha Sriram	Hesham Abdul Wahab, Sadhika KR	4:13
3.	"Mallepoola Pallaki" (original composition by Sunkara Anjaneyulu)	Chowdam Srinivasa Rao	Dappu Srinu	3:00
4.	"Karthika Maasam"	Shiva Nirvana	G. V. Prakash Kumar	4:04
5.	"Manemma"	Anantha Sriram	Kapil Kapilan	3:57
Total length:				19:24

Irumudi Kattu (Tamil)
No.	Title	Lyrics	Singer(s)	Length
1.	"Irumudi Kattu"	Balaji Venugopal	Ananthu	4:10
2.	"Manasu Thannala"	Balaji Venugopal	Hesham Abdul Wahab, Sadhika KR	4:13
3.	"Villali Veerane" (original composition by Sunkara Anjaneyulu)	Yugabharathi	Velmurugan	3:00
4.	"Karthiga Maasam"	Vignesh Ramakrishna	Haricharan	4:04
5.	"Manemma"	Balaji Venugopal	Nakul Abhyankar	3:57
Total length:				19:24

All lyrics are written by Sumitaa Ganguly.

Irumudi (Hindi)
No.	Title	Singer(s)	Length
1.	"Irumudi Bandho"	Vinayak	4:09
2.	"Yaalalo Yaalalo"	Ritesh G Rao, Maneesha Pandraniki	4:13
3.	"Manikanth Prabhu Ki Nikli Hai Palkhi" (original composition by Sunkara Anjaneyulu)	Vinayak	3:00
4.	"Pawan Kartik Mahina"	Anudeep Dev	4:04
5.	"Manemma – Meri Kismat Daulat Tu"	Ritesh G Rao	3:55
Total length:			19:18

== Reception ==
Yashaswini Sri of The Indian Express wrote "GV Prakash Kumar’s music and background score are among the film’s biggest assets. The devotional songs, particularly Irumudi Kattu and Mallepoola Pallaki, are not simply well-composed tracks attached to the film. They are woven into the narrative so tightly that removing them would change the scenes entirely. The background score knows when to press and when to pull back, a quality that separates a good score from a great one." Suresh Kavirayani of Cinema Express wrote "GV Prakash Kumar’s music is another major asset. His songs and background score complement the emotional and serious nature of the story. The film is not a typical commercial entertainer or romantic drama, and GV Prakash’s score reflects that mood effectively."

Bhawana Sharma of Moneycontrol wrote "GV Prakash Kumar's background score is one of the film's main strengths. The music is a good vehicle for the suspenseful bits and gives an emotional weight to the family sequences." B. V. S. Prakash of Deccan Chronicle wrote "Composer G. V. Prakash Kumar adds considerably to the atmosphere with his devotional songs and gripping background score."
