= Tuck Jagadish =

2021 film directed by Shiva Nirvana

- Official release poster
- Directed by: Shiva Nirvana
- Written by: Shiva Nirvana
- Produced by: Sahu Garapati; Harish Peddi
- Starring: Nani; Ritu Varma; Aishwarya Rajesh; Jagapathi Babu
- Cinematography: Prasad Murella
- Edited by: Prawin Pudi
- Music by: Songs: Thaman S Gopi Sundar (1 song); Score: Gopi Sundar
- Production company: Shine Screens
- Distributed by: Amazon Prime Video
- Release date: 10 September 2021
- Running time: 146 minutes
- Country: India
- Language: Telugu

Tuck Jagadish is a 2021 Indian Telugu-language action family drama film, written and directed by Shiva Nirvana and produced by Sahu Garapati and Harish Peddi under the banner Shine Screens. The film stars Nani as the title role, alongside Ritu Varma, Aishwarya Rajesh, and Jagapathi Babu. In the film, a revenue officer tries to reform all the property issues in the village while also planning to reunite with his elder brother's family after a dispute over inheritance.

The film was announced in December 2019 with principal photography taking place in Pollachi and Palani of Tamil Nadu, and Rajamahendravaram of Andhra Pradesh. Filming, though briefly halted by the COVID-19 pandemic, was completed in December 2020. The film features soundtrack composed by Thaman S and background music scored by Gopi Sundar. The film has cinematography by Prasad Murella and editing by Prawin Pudi.

The theatrical release of this film was deferred multiple times due to the COVID-19 pandemic, which resulting the producers to opt for direct-to-streaming release on Amazon Prime Video. The film premiered on 10 September 2021 with the festival of Vinayaka Chaviti and received negative reviews from the critics.

== Plot ==
Adisesha Naidu is the head of Bhudevipuram village. He has two sons with his first wife Tulsamma (Bosu and Jagadish) and two daughters and a son with his second wife Arjunamma (Ganga, Kumari, and Bujji who is mute). Tulasamma brings fortune to the family, through which Adisesha becomes wealthy. Following Tulsamma's death while giving birth to Jagadish, Arjunamma takes in Bosu and Jagadish as her own children, and all the children are brought up together as a joint family. Jagdish loves his stepmother and treats her as his own and also is ideal brother to all his sisters. Bosu, however, secretly dislikes the other family members as he believes he is the only rightful heir of his father's wealth as the first-born son. He also hates the thought that his father has a soft corner for his daughters. Bhudevipuram is notorious for its property disputes, which are usually solved by Adisesha Naidu. On one such occasion, Veerendra's father is killed in a feud, and he develops hatred toward Adisesha's family.

Upon Adisesha's death from cardiac arrest, Bosu threatens the advocate and ensures to prepare the will giving him all the family assets rather than to his half-siblings, contrary to what his father willed. He secretly makes a deal with Veerendra and gets his niece Chandra married to Veerendra's brother in exchange for a share in a windmill project coming up in place of farms leased out to local farmers by Adisesha. Bosu also insults Arjunamma and his half-siblings when they demand a share in the property, thereby ousting them. Following his father's death, Jagadish is sent to the city for further studies and is not informed of his Chandra's wedding. Upon returning to the village, he is furious about being kept in the dark about these disputes. He is stopped by his brother Bosu when he tries to talk him into sharing his portion of wealth with other family members. Jagadish then is appointed as the MRO for that village with the district collector's support and starts mending everything his brother has done.

Jagadish visits his Chandra and understands that she has been a victim of domestic abuse and wishes to take her away from there. When she resists, he hands her a remote with a light on the terrace of her house, which signals that she is in trouble. Unable to get a No Objection Certificate for the windmill project from MRO Jagadish, Veerendra takes ₹5 crore from the project owner Somaraju and cheats Bosu. This causes a rift between Veerendra and Bosu that leads to Bosu being attacked by Veerendra's brother.

While Bosu is in the hospital, his step-mother donates blood for his recovery. With the help of the advocate, Jagadish learns and reveals to Bosu that his step-mother Arjunamma was his biological mother and also of the sisters. He also knows that Jagadish is the only child of Adisesha's first wife Tulsamma, thereby inheriting the entire property. Bosu is torn and hurt by the way he treated his own family and mends his relationship with them. Jagadish, however, is wrongly assumed to be after the property by everyone in the family except Bosu and Chandra.

Bosu visits Veerendra to improve Chandra's married life and collect 5 crores so that it is paid back to Somaraju. Veerendra and his brother refuse and try to kill Bosu and Chandra. Chandra realizes the danger and turns on the signal to apprise Jagadish of the situation. Jagadish arrives in time, and in the ensuing fight, he kills Veerendra and his brother, before taking Bosu and Chandra back to the family. The family members realize their mistakes and misunderstandings and live together.

Jagadish marries the VRO Gummadi Varalakshmi and is transferred to a new village rampant in corruption, which he is ready to address.

== Cast ==
- Nani as MRO L. Jagadish Naidu"Jagadee"/ "Tuck" Jagadish
- Ritu Varma as VRO Gummadi Varalakshmi, Jagadish's love interest, later wife.
- Jagapathi Babu as Bosu Babu
  - Aakash Srinivas as Young Bosu Babu
- Thiruveer as Tirumala Naidu
- Aishwarya Rajesh as Chandramma "Chandra"
- Nassar as Aadisesh Naidu
- Daniel Balaji as Veerendra Naidu
- Parvathi T. as Arjunamma
- Rohini as Kumari
- Devadarshini as Ganga Bhavani
- Naresh as Sathi Babu
- Rao Ramesh as Devudu Babu
- Jayaprakash as Raghuram Patrudu
- Srikanth Iyengar as MRO Mohan Rao
- Aadukalam Naren as Somaraju
- Raghu Babu as Suryanarayana
- Praveen as Sai
- Kancharapalem Raju as Attender Simhachalam
- C. V. L. Narasimha Rao as Advocate Narayana Murthy
- Kalyanee Raju as Veerendra's mother
- Vaishnavi Chaitanya as Neelaveni
- Bindu Chandramouli as Jyothi
- Sasidhar as MRO Chandra Shekar
- Ramaraju as Seri Naidu
- Bhupal Raju as Kanna Babu
- Pammi Sai as Lingalu
- Subhash as Ramana
- Gautham Raj
- Jogi Brothers
- Baby Sideeksha as Nitya

== Production ==
=== Development ===
In August 2019, sources claimed that Nani will collaborate with Shiva Nirvana for an untitled project, marking their second collaboration after Ninnu Kori (2017). The film was reportedly produced by Sahu Garapati and Harish Peddi, under the banner Shine Screens. The film's title poster was released on 3 December 2019, with the title being revealed as Tuck Jagadish. Although there was no information on the genre or the plot, it speculated that the protagonist's character in the film will be reportedly suffering from bipolar disorder, for which Nani clarified that the news is false. Tuck Jagadish is Nani's first film in the masala genre.

=== Casting ===
On 2 December 2019, Ritu Varma was cast alongside Nani, after having previously collaborated for Yevade Subramanyam (2015). The film marked her return to Telugu films after Kesava (2017), where she was reported to play a village girl in the film. She called it as her "big commercial film". Aishwarya Rajesh was also cast in the second leading role, with Jagapathi Babu being seen as Nani's brother. The cast members also included Nassar, Daniel Balaji, Thiruveer, Rohini, Devadarshini, and Praveen.

=== Filming ===
The film was launched officially on 30 January 2020, with principal shoot began on 11 February 2020. The filming initially took place in Pollachi after which the crew headed to Rajamahendravaram to shoot some crucial scenes, an action sequence and the song "Inkosaari Inkosaari" was planned to be shot, before filming came to halt, due to the COVID-19 pandemic. On 7 October 2020, Nani resumed the shooting of the film in Hyderabad, adhering to the safety guidelines ensured to curb COVID-19 spread. However, on 18 October, the team halted shoot after its key technician was diagnosed with COVID-19. As only 75% of the shooting is under completion, before lockdown, the makers continued the shoot. The film entered its final schedule on 5 December 2020, and also entered its post-production stage, with Nani started dubbing for his portions in January 2021.

== Music ==
Tuck Jagadish

Soundtrack album by Thaman S and Gopi Sundar
- Released: 1 September 2021
- Recorded: 2021
- Genre: Feature film soundtrack
- Length: 17:56
- Language: Telugu
- Label: Aditya Music
- Producers: Thaman S Gopi Sundar
External audio
- Audio Jukebox on YouTube

Thaman S chronology
Vakeel Saab (2021)	Tuck Jagadish (2021)	Varudu Kaavalenu (2021)

Gopi Sundar chronology
One (2021)	Tuck Jagadish (2021)	Most Eligible Bachelor (2021)

Singles from Tuck Jagadish
- 1. "Inkosaari Inkosaari" Released: 13 February 2021; 2. "Kolo Kolanna Kolo" Released: 13 March 2021; 3. "Neeti Neeti Sukka" Released: 27 March 2021

The film was originally announced with Thaman S as the music director, in his first collaboration with Nani and his second with Shiva Nirvana after working on the film score for Majili (2019). However, due to differences of opinion with Shiva Nirvana, Thaman walked out of the project and subsequently, Gopi Sundar, who worked in Nirvana's previous films, did the background score.

Eventually, Thaman finished composing five songs for the film's soundtrack, before his exit. The song "Inkosaari Inkosaari" was released as the first single on 13 February 2021 ahead of Valentine's Day. The single had lyrics written by Chaitanya Prasad and was sung by Shreya Ghoshal and Kaala Bhairava. On 13 March 2021, another single "Kolo Kolanna Kolo" was released which had lyrics written by Sirivennela Seetharama Sastry and sung by Armaan Malik, Sri Krishna and Harini Ivvaturi. The third single "Neeti Neeti Sukka" sung by Mohana Bhogaraju and written by Kalyan Chakravarthy was released on 27 March 2021, coinciding with Parichaya Vedika, a special promotional event for the film which was held on the same day.

Despite working on the film score, Sundar also composed one song titled as "Tuck Song" was released along with the soundtrack album on 1 September 2021. The track was sung and written by the director Shiva Nirvana, making his debut in both the fields. A reviewer from Indiaglitz said that "With the set of songs in the soundtrack, one can say that Tuck Jagadish is a mass-commercial entertainer, and the songs will have a massy appeal to all kinds of audience". Deccan Herald opined that the film score works in a few scenes but falls flat in others. Another critic from 123Telugu wrote that Thaman's work in the soundtrack was decent but criticised Gopi Sundar's score stating that it was below par.

Track listing
No.	Title	Lyrics	Music	Singer(s)	Length
1.	"Inkosaari Inkosaari"	Chaitanya Prasad	Thaman S	Shreya Ghoshal, Kaala Bhairava	3:28
2.	"Kolo Kolanna Kolo"	Sirivennela Seetharama Sastry	Thaman S	Armaan Malik, Sri Krishna, Harini Ivvaturi	5:01
3.	"Neeti Neeti Sukka"	Kalyan Chakravarthy	Thaman S	Mohana Bhogaraju	1:36
4.	"Tuck Song"	Shiva Nirvana	Gopi Sundar	Shiva Nirvana	1:51
5.	"Yetikokka Poota"	Kalyan Chakravarthy	Thaman S	Mohana Bhogaraju	1:35
6.	"Needhi Nadhantu"	Kalyan Chakravarthy	Thaman S	Sri Krishna	4:25
Total length:					17:56

== Release ==
The film was initially scheduled for a theatrical release on 16 April 2021, but was later pushed back by a week to 23 April 2021. The release was put on hold, following the second wave of COVID-19 in India. Following, the reopening of theatres in Andhra Pradesh and Telangana, the producers of Tuck Jagadish reinstated the plans for theatrical release during late-July and early-August. However, they had decided to release the film through over-the-top streaming services (OTT), following the regulations of ticket prices levied by the Chief minister of Andhra Pradesh, Y. S. Jagan Mohan Reddy faced disapproval from the exhibitors. In this process, medium and high-budget films may garner higher ticket rates as per the new regulations, which was condemned by many members from the film fraternity. The digital rights were sold to Amazon Prime Video.

The film was planned for a release on 10 September 2021, during the festival Ganesh Chaturthi. However, Sunil Narang, the vice president of Telangana Film Chamber of Commerce (TFCC), requested the producers not to release on the date, as it may eventually affect the prospects of Love Story (2021), another film which scheduled for release theatrically on the same date, and was postponed later. However, the producers claimed that the decision was taken by the streaming platform's executives, and the producers do not have to interfere about the change of release. In an interview to The Indian Express, Nani spoke about the film's release that "An OTT is a great platform to watch different types of content. It also has a massive reach and has inspired a change in the preferences of the audience. However, I firmly believe that nothing can replace the big-screen entertainment."

=== Marketing ===
As a part of the promotional purposes, Tuck Jagadish Parichaya Vedika, a promotional pre-release event was planned by the film's team. Starting from 27 March 2021, the team planned four events across Andhra Pradesh and Telangana states. The first set of event was held at Rajamahendravaram, with the film's team being present at the event. However, due to restrictions imposed by government to curb COVID-19 spread, the team suspended the plans for three other promotional events, and held a formal press meet during the first week of April 2021. Another promotional event was held on 1 September 2021 at H. I. C. C. Novotel in Hyderabad, to release the film's trailer and songs. A virtual fan meet was held on 8 September 2021, prior to the film's release.

== Reception ==
Tuck Jagadish received mixed reviews from the critics. Writing for The Hindu, Sangeetha Devi Dundoo called Tuck Jagadish a familiar family drama with a predictable storyline. She appreciated the emotional scenes between the characters and stated: "The later part of the story, though predictable and long-drawn, work partly because of the earnestness with which Nani, Aishwarya Rajesh and Jagapati Babu shoulder it. Ritu Varma is charming and effective." Manoj Kumar R of The Indian Express said that the film was "old wine in a new bottle," criticizing the poor writing by Nirvana. "He seems to have borrowed, rehashed and refurbished ideas and the philosophy of all hit melodramatic films that he has ever watched without any value addition," he added. Hindustan Times critic Haricharan Pudipeddi also felt the same, and wrote: "The emotional family drama moments are tiring to sit through, and the film is stuck in the 1980s, story-wise, but luckily the action choreography and performances make up for the boring plot."

Murali Krishna CH of Cinema Express stated: "Tuck Jagadish is a mixed bag of emotions that depicts family conflict, sibling rivalry and heartbreak." Contrary to other critics, Krishna opined that the pacing was aptly suited to the film, given its "delicate, emotional tale that evokes the complexity of its premise." India Today editor Janani K concluded her review by stating: "Tuck Jagadish is an emotional family drama that stresses the importance of human relationships. Had the screenplay had some refreshing sequences, the film would have had more impact."

The Quint gave a rating of 3 out of 5 and opined that the film just stops short of being fully 'mass'. They further cited it as "pleasant yet familiar good vs evil story". Balakrishna Ganeshan of The News Minute opined that the title had little relevance to the plot and suggested Naidu gari Kutumbam (transl. Naidu's family) instead. Ganesan also explored the politics of the film and wrote: "Tollywood films have always looked at village life from the perspective of Gandhi, or to be more precise, from an upper caste perspective that romanticises it. Villages are a cesspool of casteism. Defying caste codes will result in violence of various degrees."
