= Thalli Pogathey =

- Theatrical release poster
- Directed by: R. Kannan
- Screenplay by: Kona Venkat
- Based on: Ninnu Kori (2017) by Shiva Nirvana
- Dialogues by: Kabilan Vairamuthu
- Produced by: R. Kannan
- Starring: Atharvaa; Anupama Parameswaran; Amitash Pradhan
- Cinematography: N. Shanmuga Sundaram
- Edited by: R. K. Selva
- Music by: Gopi Sunder
- Production companies: Masala Pix; MKRP Productions
- Distributed by: Magic Rays
- Release date: 24 December 2021
- Running time: 140 minutes
- Country: India
- Language: Tamil

Thalli Pogathey (transl. Don't go away) is a 2021 Indian Tamil-language romantic comedy drama film directed and produced by R. Kannan. It is a remake of 2017 Telugu film Ninnu Kori written by Shiva Nirvana. This film stars Atharvaa, Anupama Parameswaran and Amitash Pradhan. The film is produced by R. Kannan himself under the banner Masala Pix, in association with MKRP Productions. Gopi Sunder, who was the composer for original film, composed music for the film also.

The title is inspired by the song of the same name from Achcham Yenbadhu Madamaiyada (2016). The film released on 24 December 2021. The film received mixed reviews from critics with criticism for Anupama's performance, writing, emotional weight and characterization but with praise for Atharvaa's performance, cinematography, score and production design.

== Plot ==
On her first wedding anniversary, Pallavi travels from San Francisco to Los Angeles under the pretext of running errands, unbeknownst to her husband Arun. Her actual intention is to meet Karthik, her former lover.

One and a half years ago in Chennai, Pallavi, a student aspiring to record a dance performance for her family, lacks the necessary talent. Karthik, a young statistics student and orphan, is supported by his godfather, Duraisamy, the principal of his institution. Karthik aims to pursue a Ph.D. Pallavi spots Karthik dancing at a friend’s wedding and asks him to teach her. Karthik agrees for a large fee, which he needs. He helps Pallavi with her dancing and other issues, including confronting a bully. They eventually fall in love.

Pallavi arranges for Karthik to stay in her family’s penthouse, where he starts tutoring and earning money. When Pallavi’s family begins seeking marriage alliances, she asks Karthik to elope with her. He agrees but reconsiders after a chance encounter with Pallavi’s father. Realizing he is not yet settled, Karthik asks Pallavi to let him pursue a Ph.D. in New Delhi. Pallavi tearfully agrees. Over the next few months, Pallavi ignores Karthik’s attempts to contact her. Her family arranges her marriage to Arun. When Pallavi contacts Karthik, she realizes she is not ready to risk his future and unwillingly marries Arun. A year later, Prof. Duraisamy informs Pallavi that Karthik has become depressed and alcoholic. He is on the verge of being fired by his firm in Los Angeles. Feeling responsible, Pallavi travels to meet him.

In Los Angeles, Pallavi tells Karthik she is happily married and does not wish to reunite. Karthik disagrees, insisting she still loves him. Back in San Francisco, Pallavi tells Arun about her encounter and suggests inviting Karthik to stay with them for 10 days to prove her happiness. Karthik agrees on the condition that if he fails to see love between her and Arun, she must leave with him. Pallavi reluctantly agrees.

Karthik’s presence creates tension as he mocks their relationship, annoying Pallavi. Arun’s colleagues like Karthik despite his pessimistic nature offending some. The situation becomes complicated when Pallavi’s father and his son-in-law, Omkar, unexpectedly visit San Francisco. Karthik is introduced as Arun’s old classmate and promises Pallavi to keep his true purpose hidden. Pallavi’s father, learning from Pallavi’s friend Nisha about her past relationship, suspects her happiness. He came to San Francisco to find her former lover and help Pallavi if she wanted.

Karthik indirectly helps Pallavi’s father and Omkar discover the truth. When interrogated, Nisha fabricates a story, saying Pallavi’s lover is married. Pallavi assures her father she is happy. During a trip to Santa Monica for Arun’s business meeting, Pallavi discovers Arun’s infidelity after seeing him hug another woman. Pallavi’s father also learns about Karthik from a phone call with Arun’s father and Nisha.

Pallavi confronts Arun, who lies again, confirming his infidelity. She confides in Karthik, who believes she now wants to be with him. However, when Pallavi’s father tells Karthik he wishes Pallavi to marry him, Karthik reveals Arun’s backstory. Arun’s first friend during his MBA was Caroline. Feeling he found a best friend, he was shocked when she proposed to him, as he never saw her that way. After rejecting her, Caroline became a drug addict and attempted suicide, causing Arun great guilt. This guilt persuaded him to allow Pallavi to call Karthik, believing Karthik was heading in the same direction as Caroline.

Realizing Pallavi should stay with Arun, Karthik stages a scenario making himself appear negative to Pallavi, coaxing her to recognize Arun’s honesty. Arun prepares to leave, but Pallavi stops him. They clear their misunderstanding, reaffirming their love. As they embrace, Karthik leaves, heartbroken.

== Cast ==
- Atharvaa as Karthik
- Anupama Parameswaran as Pallavi (Voice dubbed by Chinmayi)
- Amithash Pradhan as Arun
- Aadukalam Naren as Pallavi's father
- Kaali Venkat as Omkar
- Vidyullekha Raman as Nisha, Pallavi's friend
- R. S. Shivaji as Duraisamy, Karthik's professor
- Jagan as Karthik's friend
- R. Raja Elangovan

Uncredited

- Stunt Silva as the bike thief
- Girish Pradhan as Arun's father

== Production ==
Atharvaa and Anupama Parameswaran were cast in the lead roles with Vaibhav speculated to also be a part of the cast. The media reports proved to be false and Amitash Pradhan was cast in the lead. Vidyullekha Raman reprises her role from the original film. The film was shot in Chennai, Russia, as well as Baku and Xızı in Azerbaijan. The cast and crew hiked up a mountain in Xızı for a five-minute shot in the film. The film is set in Lille, France.

== Soundtrack ==
Music of the film was composed by Gopi Sunder. All of the songs from the original Telugu version except the title song were retained and remade in Tamil. Kabilan Vairamuthu penned lyrics.

Track listing
No.	Title	Singer(s)	Length
1.	"Enna Thavam Seithen"	Sathya Prakash, Saindhavi	4:37
2.	"Idhaya Idhaya"	Sid Sriram	3:28
3.	"Nee Varaindha Oviyam"	Haricharan	3:53
4.	"The Boy Story"	Deepak	2:22
Total length:			14:20

== Release ==
The film was scheduled to release on 3 December 2021, but was postponed. The film released on 24 December 2021. The streaming rights was acquired by Amazon Prime Video. The film's satellite rights was acquired by Colors Tamil.

== Reception ==
M. Suganth of The Times of India gave the film 2 out of 5 criticizing the writing, characterization, performances and emotional weight but praised the production settings but felt that "But this, in turn, only makes us feel like we are watching a feature-length TV commercial with hardly any emotional involvement." Sify gave the film 3 on a scale of 5 and called the film "Thalli Pogathey is yet another watchable Telugu remake!"
