= Pudi =

Pudi is a surname. Notable people with the surname include:

- Danny Pudi (born 1979), American actor
- Prawin Pudi (born 1982), Indian film editor
