= Sahu Garapati =

Indian film producer

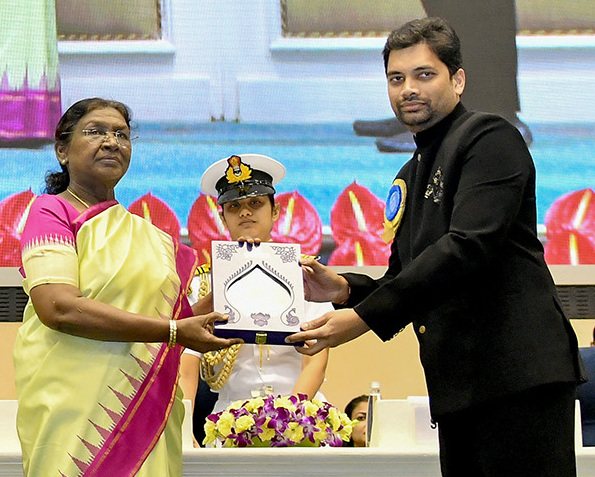
- Sahu receiving National Film Award in 2025
- Born: 9 July 1982 (age 44)
- Occupation: Film producer
- Years active: 2018–present

Sahu Garapati is an Indian film producer who works primarily in Telugu cinema. He has produced Bhagavanth Kesari (2023) under the banner Shine Screens, which won him the National Film Award.

== Filmography ==
Key
†	Denotes films that have not yet been released

- All the films are in Telugu language unless otherwise mentioned.

Year	Film	Director	Notes	Ref.
2018	Krishnarjuna Yudham	Merlapaka Gandhi		
2019	Majili	Shiva Nirvana		
2021	Tuck Jagadish	Shiva Nirvana		
2021	Gaali Sampath	Anish R. Krishna		
2023	Ugram	Vijay Kanakamedala		
2023	Bhagavanth Kesari	Anil Ravipudi		
2025	Laila	Ram Narayan		
2025	Vyasanasametham Bandhumithradhikal	S. Vipin	Malayalam film	
2025	Kishkindhapuri	Koushik Pegallapati		
2026	Mana Shankara Vara Prasad Garu	Anil Ravipudi		
2026	Vaazha II: Biopic of a Billion Bros	Savin S A	Malayalam film	
2027	January 12 Vidudala †	Anil Ravipudi		
2027	#SD19 †	Sujith-Sandeep		

== Awards and nominations ==
Award	Category	Work	Result	Ref.
9th South Indian International Movie Awards	Best Film – Telugu	Majili	Nominated	
71st National Film Awards	Best Telugu Feature Film	Bhagavanth Kesari	Won	
12th South Indian International Movie Awards	Best Film – Telugu	Bhagavanth Kesari	Won	
Gaddar Telangana Film Awards	Gaddar Award for Third Best Feature Film	Bhagavanth Kesari	Won	
Kalavedika NTR Film Awards	Best Producer	Bhagavanth Kesari	Won	
3rd IIFA Utsavam	Best Picture – Telugu	Bhagavanth Kesari	Nominated	
