= SIIMA Award for Best Film – Telugu =

- Awarded for: Best Telugu-language film of the year
- Country: India
- Presented by: Vibri Media Group
- First award: 21 June 2012 (for films released in 2011)
- Most recent winner: Mirai (2025)

The SIIMA Award for Best Film – Telugu is presented by the Vibri Media Group as part of its annual South Indian International Movie Awards for Telugu films. The award was first given in 2012 for films released in 2011.

== Winners ==
List of SIIMA Award winners for best film in Telugu
Year	Title	Producer	Ref.
2011	Dookudu	Ram Achanta, Gopichand Achanta and Anil Sunkara	
2012	Eega	Sai Korrapati	
2013	Attarintiki Daredi	B. V. S. N. Prasad	
2014	Manam	Nagarjuna	
2015	Baahubali: The Beginning	Shobu Yarlagadda and Prasad Devineni	
2016	Pelli Choopulu	Raj Kandukuri and Yash Rangineni	
2017	Baahubali 2: The Conclusion	Shobu Yarlagadda and Prasad Devineni	
2018	Mahanati	Swapna Dutt and Priyanka Dutt	
2019	Jersey	Naga Vamsi	
2020	Ala Vaikunthapurramuloo	Allu Aravind and S. Radha Krishna	
2021	Pushpa: The Rise	Naveen Yerneni and Yalamanchili Ravi Shankar	
2022	Sita Ramam	C. Aswini Dutt	
2023	Bhagavanth Kesari	Sahu Garapati	
2024	Kalki 2898 AD	C. Aswini Dutt	
2025	Mirai	TG Vishwa Prasad and Krithi Prasad	

== Nominations ==
- 2011: Dookudu – Ram Achanta, Gopichand Achanta and Anil Sunkara / 14 Reels Entertainment
  - Sri Rama Rajyam – Sri Sai Baba Movies / Yalamanchali Sai Babu
  - Mr. Perfect – Dil Raju / Sri Venkateswara Creations
  - 100% Love – Geetha Arts / Bunny Vasu
  - Ala Modalaindi – K. L. Damodar Prasad / Sri Ranjith Movies
- 2012: Eega – Korrapati Ranganatha Sai / Vaaraahi Chalana Chitram
  - Gabbar Singh – Bandla Ganesh / Parameswara Art Productions
  - Ishq – N. Sudheer Reddy, Vikram Goud
  - Julai – S. Radha Krishna and D.V.V. Danayya / Haarika & Hasinee Creations
  - Poola Rangadu – R. R. Venkat and Atchi Reddy / R. R. Movie Makers
- 2013: Attarintiki Daredi – B. V. S. N. Prasad / Reliance Entertainment and Sri Venkateswara Cine Chitra
  - Gunde Jaari Gallanthayyinde – Nikitha Reddy / Sresht Movies
  - Seethamma Vakitlo Sirimalle Chettu – Dil Raju /Sri Venkateswara Creations
  - Mirchi – V. Vamsi Krishna Reddy and Pramod Uppalapati / UV Creations
  - Prema Katha Chitram – Maruthi and Sudharshan Reddy / Maruthi Media House Productions
- 2014: Manam – Annapurna Studios / Nagarjuna
  - Legend – Ram Achanta, Gopichand Achanta and Anil Sunkara /14 Reels Entertainment
  - Govindudu Andarivadele – Bandla Ganesh / Parameswara Art Productions
  - Chandamama Kathalu – Chanakya Booneti
  - Race Gurram – Nallamalapu Srinivas / Sri Lakshmi Narasimha Productions
- 2015: Baahubali: The Beginning – Shobu Yarlagadda and Prasad Devineni / Arka Media Works
  - Bhale Bhale Magadivoy – Bunny Vassu / UV Creations
  - Kanche – Y. Rajeev Reddy & J. Sai Babu / First Frame Entertainments
  - Srimanthudu – Mythri Movie Makers
  - Rudramadevi – Gunasekhar / Gunaa Team Works
- 2016: Pelli Choopulu – BigBen Cinemas and Dharmapath Creations
  - A Aa – S. Radha Krishna / Haarika & Hasinee Creations
  - Janatha Garage – Mythri Movie Makers
  - Kshanam – Prasad V. Potluri / PVP Cinema
  - Sarrainodu – Allu Aravind / Geetha Arts
- 2017: Baahubali 2: The Conclusion – Shobu Yarlagadda and Prasad Devineni / Arka Media Works
  - Fidaa – Dil Raju / Sri Venkateswara Creations
  - Gautamiputra Satakarni – Y. Rajeev Reddy / First Frame Entertainments
  - Ghazi – Prasad V. Potluri / PVP Cinema & K. Anvesh Reddy/Matinee Entertainment
  - Sathamanam Bhavati – Dil Raju / Sri Venkateswara Creations
- 2018: Mahanati – Swapna Dutt and Priyanka Dutt / Vyjayanthi Movies
  - Aravinda Sametha Veera Raghava – S. Radha Krishna / Haarika & Hasinee Creations
  - Bharat Ane Nenu – D. V. V. Danayya / DVV Entertainments
  - Geetha Govindam – Bunny Vasu / GA2 Pictures
  - Rangasthalam – Mythri Movie Makers
- 2019: Jersey – Sithara Entertainments
  - Maharshi – Sri Venkateswara Creations
  - Majili –Shine Screens
  - Sye Raa Narasimha Reddy – Konidela Production Company
  - F2: Fun and Frustration – Sri Venkateswara Creations
- 2020: Ala Vaikunthapurramuloo – Geetha Arts, Haarika & Hassine Creations
  - Sarileru Neekevvaru – Sri Venkateswara Creations, G. Mahesh Babu Entertainment, AK Entertainments
  - Bheeshma – Sithara Entertainments
  - Solo Brathuke So Better – Sri Venkateswara Cine Chitra
  - Uma Maheswara Ugra Roopasya – Arka Media Works, Mahayana Motion Pictures
- 2021: Pushpa: The Rise – Mythri Movie Makers, Muttamsetty Media
  - Akhanda – Dwaraka Creations
  - Love Story – Amigos Creations, Sree Venkateswara Cinemas
  - Jathi Ratnalu – Swapna Cinema
  - Uppena – Mythri Movie Makers, Sukumar Writings
- 2022: Sita Ramam – Vyjayanthi Movies, Swapna Cinema
  - DJ Tillu – Sithara Entertainments
  - Karthikeya 2 – Abhishek Agarwal Arts, People Media Factory
  - Major – G. Mahesh Babu Entertainment, Sony Pictures International Productions, A+S Movies
  - RRR – DVV Entertainment
- 2023: Bhagavanth Kesari – Shine Screens
  - Baby – Mass Movie Makers
  - Balagam – Dil Raju Productions
  - Dasara – Sri Lakshmi Venkateswara Cinemas
  - Hi Nanna – Vyra Entertainments
  - Virupaksha – Sri Venkateswara Cine Chitra, Sukumar Writings
- 2024: Kalki 2898 AD – Vyjayanthi Movies
  - Devara: Part 1 – Yuvasudha Arts, N. T. R. Arts
  - Hanu-Man – Primeshow Entertainment
  - Lucky Baskhar – Sithara Entertainments
  - Pushpa 2: The Rule – Mythri Movie Makers
- 2025: Mirai – People Media Factory
  - Court: State vs a Nobody – Wall Poster Cinema
  - HIT: The Third Case – Wall Poster Cinema and Unanimous Productions
  - Sankranthiki Vasthunam – Sri Venkateswara Creations
  - Thandel – Geetha Arts
  - The Girlfriend – Dheeraj Mogilineni Entertainment
