= Paramporul =

- Theatrical release poster
- Directed by: C. Aravind Raj
- Written by: C. Aravind Raj
- Produced by: Manoj; Girish Pradhan
- Starring: R. Sarathkumar; Amithash Pradhan
- Cinematography: S. Pandikumar
- Edited by: Nagooran Ramachandran
- Music by: Yuvan Shankar Raja
- Production company: Kavi Creations
- Distributed by: Sakthi Film Factory
- Release date: 1 September 2023
- Country: India
- Language: Tamil

Paramporul (transl. Almighty) is a 2023 Indian Tamil-language action thriller film written and directed by debutant C. Aravind Raj. It is produced by Manoj and Girish Pradhan under Kavi Creations. The film stars R. Sarathkumar and Amithash Pradhan in the lead roles, alongside Kashmira Pardeshi, Balaji Sakthivel and T. Siva in supporting role.

The film was officially announced in December 2021, under the tentative title Production No.1, as it was the production banner's first production, while the official title Paramporul was revealed in October 2022. The music is composed by Yuvan Shankar Raja, while the cinematography and editing are handled by S. Pandikumar and Nagooran Ramachandran.

Paramporul was released on 1 September 2023. It received positive reviews from critics and became a hit at the box office.

== Synopsis ==
Aadhi, who desperately needs money to save his sister, happens to meet police officer, Maithreyan, during a theft. They both get involved in an idol trade, which eventually leads to chaos.

== Cast ==
- R. Sarathkumar as Inspector R. Maithreyan
- Amithash Pradhan as Aadhi
- Kashmira Pardeshi as Yamini, Maithreyan's sister-in-law and Aadhi's love interest
- Balaji Sakthivel as Professor/Aadhi's biological father
- T. Siva as Aadhi's father
- Gajaraj
- Vincent Asokan
- V. Balakrishnan as Varun Rao
- Charles Vinoth as Balu
- Ravi Venkatraman
- Girish Pradhan as Lorry owner
- Ajith Koshy as Police Commissioner
- Ram Rajendran as antagonist's associate

== Production ==
On 10 December 2021, Kavi Creations announced their first production film, starring R. Sarathkumar, Amitash Pradhan and Kashmira Pardeshi and to be directed by debutant C. Aravind Raj, and was tentatively titled as Production No.1. The official title Paramporul was revealed on 4 March 2022. Amitash started dubbing his portions in May.

== Music ==
Paramporul

Soundtrack album by Yuvan Shankar Raja
- Released: 11 August 2023
- Recorded: 2022–2023
- Studio: U1 Records, Chennai
- Genre: Film soundtrack
- Length: 11:08
- Language: Tamil
- Label: U1 Records
- Producer: Yuvan Shankar Raja

Yuvan Shankar Raja chronology
Bommai (2023)	Paramporul (2023)	Iraivan (2023)

Singles from Paramporul
- 1. "Sippara Rippara" Released: August 11, 2022; 2. "Adiyaathi" Released: August 9, 2023; 3. "Asaivindri" Released: August 24, 2023

The music and background score were composed by Yuvan Shankar Raja, in his maiden collaboration with Amitash and Aravind. The first single "Sippara Rippara" released on 11 August 2022, the second single "Adiyaathi" on 9 August 2023, and the third single "Asaivindri" on 24 August.

No.	Title	Lyrics	Singer(s)	Length
1.	"Sippara Rippara"	Vivek	Shankar Mahadevan, Amitash Pradhan	3:58
2.	"Adiyaathi"	Snehan	Anirudh Ravichander, Yuvan Shankar Raja	3:22
3.	"Asaivindri"	Madhan Karky	Yuvan Shankar Raja, Shreya Ghoshal	3:48
Total length:				11:08

== Release and reception ==
Paramporul released theatrically on 1 September 2023, clashing with Santhanam's Kick and Hamaresh's Rangoli. The distribution rights for Tamil Nadu were acquired by Sakthi Film Factory.

The film earned positive reviews from critics, including reviewers at The Hindu, The New Indian Express and Times of India.
