= Rampaat =

- Theatrical release poster
- Directed by: Ravi Jadhav
- Written by: Ravi Jadhav
- Produced by: Meghana Jadhav
- Starring: Abhinay Berde; Kashmira Pardeshi
- Cinematography: Vasudeo Rane
- Edited by: Abhijit Deshpande
- Music by: Chinar - Mahesh
- Production companies: Zee Studios; Athaansh Communications
- Release date: 17 May 2019
- Country: India
- Language: Marathi

Rampaat is a 2019 Marathi-language film directed by Ravi Jadhav. The film stars Abhinay Berde and Kashmira Pardeshi in the lead roles and Abhijeet Chavan in supporting role.

== Cast ==
- Abhinay Berde as Mithun
- Kashmira Pardeshi as Munni
- Abhijeet Chavan as Munni's father
- Kushal Badrike as Photographer
- Priya Arun as Mithun's mother
- Ankush Choudhary as himself (cameo appearance in the song "Aaichaan Ra")
- Amruta Khanvilkar as herself (cameo appearance in the song "Aaichaan Ra")

== Soundtrack ==
The music was composed by music duo Chinar - Mahesh.

- "Rampaat Rap" - A-Jeet, J-Subodh, Jazzy Nanu, Axsboy and Killer Roxx
- "Ye Na Ye Na" - Bela Shende and Rohit Raut
- "Aaichaan Ra" - Harshavardhan Wavre, Bela Shende
- "Devaji Cha Daan" - Saurabh Salunkhe

== Reception ==
The Times of India gave the film two-and-a-half out of five stars wrote that "It misses the mark in holding your attention completely, but for the filmy lot among you, this one could be entertaining."
