= Majili =

2019 Indian film by Shiva Nirvana

- Theatrical release poster
- Directed by: Shiva Nirvana
- Written by: Shiva Nirvana
- Produced by: Sahu Garapati; Harish Peddi
- Starring: Naga Chaitanya; Samantha Ruth Prabhu; Divyansha Kaushik
- Cinematography: Vishnu Sarma
- Edited by: Prawin Pudi
- Music by: Gopi Sunder
- Production company: Shine Screens
- Release date: 5 April 2019
- Running time: 154 minutes
- Country: India
- Language: Telugu
- Budget: ₹22 crore
- Box office: est. ₹70 crore

Majili (transl. A part of a journey) is a 2019 Indian Telugu-language romantic sports drama film directed by Shiva Nirvana and produced by Sahu Garapati and Harish Peddi under the banner of Shine Screens Production. The film stars Naga Chaitanya, Samantha Ruth Prabhu and Divyansha Kaushik, with Subbaraju, Rao Ramesh, and Atul Kulkarni in supporting roles. The film follows a high functioning alcoholic cricket coach struggling to overcome his past trauma, while his wife selflessly ensures his rehabilitation, at the cost of her own happiness.

The film marks Chaitanya and Samantha's fourth collaboration after Ye Maaya Chesave, Manam, and Autonagar Surya.

It released on 5 April 2019 to generally positive reviews from both the audience and critics, alike. The film was remade in Marathi as Ved in 2022.

== Plot ==
Poorna, a young man living in Vizag with his father Rama Chandra, aspires to play for the Indian national cricket team and aims for selection at the local railway squad. While trying to secure funds to advance his sports career, he meets Anshu. Despite initial misunderstandings, the two fall in love. However, Anshu's family forcibly separates them. Though she promises to return, Anshu never does, leaving Poorna heartbroken. Devastated, he turns to alcoholism and abandons his cricket ambitions.

Meanwhile, Poorna's neighbour Sravani harbours a long-standing, unrequited love for him. Though she initially steps back after learning about Anshu, she eventually marries Poorna years later to ease the distress of both Poorna and his father. Poorna acquiesces to the marriage under parental pressure but remains emotionally distant and unemployed, relying entirely on Sravani's earnings as an Indian Railways employee at Simhachalam railway station while continuing his heavy drinking.

Years later, Poorna travels to Dehradun to assist in selecting players for a youth cricket team and encounters Meera, who turns out to be Anshu's daughter. Anshu's father, Rajeev, reveals that Anshu and her husband, Kunal, died in a fatal accident. At Rajeev's request, Poorna agrees to take Meera to Vizag to train her in cricket. Upon discovering her mother's past with Poorna, Meera insists on representing the local railway team. Since eligibility requires a parent to be a railway employee, Poorna and Sravani decide to formally adopt her. Meera agrees on the condition that Poorna and Sravani live together as a genuine married couple rather than as strangers.

Living together under these terms, Poorna recognizes Sravani's deep affection and resolves to let go of his past to build a real life with her. Mistakenly believing Poorna is merely acting for Meera's sake, Sravani applies for a job transfer to Bhubaneswar to distance herself. As Poorna sees her off at the railway station, he confesses his genuine love for her. Moved by his sincerity, Sravani cancels her transfer, and the couple reconciles.

== Cast ==
- Naga Chaitanya as Poorna Chandra Rao
- Samantha Ruth Prabhu as Sravani, Poorna Chandra Rao's wife (Voice dubbed by Chinmayi)
- Divyansha Kaushik as Anshu, Poorna Chandra Rao's ex-lover
- Suhas as Jonty, Poorna's friend
- Shivakumar Ramachandravarapu as Ganesh, Bhushan's henchman who deceives Poorna.
- Subbaraju as Corporator Bhushan
- Rao Ramesh as Jagannadham, Poorna's father
- Atul Kulkarni as Navy Officer Rajeev, Anshu's father
- Ananya Agarwal as Meera, Anshu, and Kunal's daughter (later adopted daughter of Sravani and Poorna)
- Posani Krishna Murali as Rajendra, Sravani's father
- Sai Teja Kalvakota as Kunal, Anshu's husband
- Rajshri Nair as Sri Lakshmi, Sravani's mother
- Ravi Prakash as Coach Srinu
- C. V. L. Narasimha Rao as Subramanyam, Sravani's manager
- Rajitha as Anshu's mother
- Ankith Koyya as Masthan
- Sudharshan as Poorna's friend

== Production ==
The second schedule was shot in Vizag, at the Simhachalam railway station, where Samantha was seen as a booking clerk.

The movie was wrapped up on 21 February 2019. Dubbing work and post-production was completed on 16 March 2019.

== Soundtrack ==
Majili

Soundtrack album by Gopi Sundar
- Released: 30 March 2019
- Recorded: 2019
- Venues: Chennai; Cochin
- Studio: Sunsa Digital Workstation
- Genre: Feature film soundtrack
- Length: 22:41
- Label: Aditya Music
- Producer: Gopi Sundar

Gopi Sundar chronology
Kodathi Samaksham Balan Vakkeel (2019)	Majili (2019)	Argentina Fans Kaattoorkadavu (2019)
External audio
- Official Audio Jukebox on YouTube

The music is composed by Gopi Sundar, and the background score is by S. Thaman released on Aditya Music label.

First track from the album, "One Boy One Girl", was released on 8 March 2019. Second track "Priyathama Priyathama" sung by Chinmayi and lyrics penned by Chaitanyaprasad was released on 11 March 2019. Third track "Naa Gundello" sung by Yazin Nizar and Nikhita Gandhi and lyrics penned by Rambabu Gosala was released on 14 March 2019. Fourth track Yedetthu Mallele sung by Kaala Bhairava and Nikhita Gandhi and lyrics penned by Shiva Nirvana was released on 18 March 2019. Fifth track, Ye Manishike Majiliyo, sung by Arun Gopan, Chinmayi, and Baby Anusha and lyrics penned by Vanamali was released on 21 March 2019.

The Times of India singled out the song Priyathama Priyathama for praise.

Track list
No.	Title	Lyrics	Singer(s)	Length
1.	"One Boy One Girl"	Bhaskarabhatla	Revanth	03:50
2.	"Priyathama Priyathama"	Chaitanya Prasad	Chinmayi	04:04
3.	"Naa Gundello"	Rambabu Gosala	Yazin Nizar, Nikhita Gandhi	04:23
4.	"Yedetthu Mallele"	Shiva Nirvana	Kaala Bhairava, Nikhita Gandhi	02:12
5.	"Ye Manishike Majiliyo"	Vanamali	Arun Gopan, Chinmayi, Baby Anusha	04:02
6.	"Maayya Maayya"	Bhaskarabhatla	Anurag Kulkarni	04:10
Total length:				22:41

== Release ==
The movie was released on 5 April 2019 as Ugadi Special. Moonshine Cinemas, an Overseas distribution company is released movie in USA, Premieres on 4 April.

=== Marketing ===
The first look of Naga Chaitanya was revealed on his birthday. The look featured the actor in a beard, sitting on an old-model scooter. The first look of the film released on 30 December 2018, one day before new year which features Naga Chaitanya with a beard look and Samantha holding each other. The second look of the film was released on the eve of Makar Sankranti 14 January 2019, which features Chaitanya as cricketer with clean shave look and Divyansha Kaushik by his side. A new poster was released on 12 February 2019, in which Naga Chaitanya and Samantha were seen happy on boarding bus, and the team has announced the teaser date. Teaser of the movie was released on 14 February 2019 as a Valentine's Day treat.

Team has announced a contest my releasing a new poster as 'My Majili Poster' on 1 March 2019, in which Samantha looking at Chaitanya happily which look so adorable, and a cricket kit bag beside Chaitanya. A new poster was released on 3 March 2019 in which Naga Chaitanya and Samantha are seen on bike, in which Samantha looks happy seeing Chaitanya.

A pre-release event was held on 31 March 2019, to which Venkatesh and Nagarjuna attended as chief guests. And movie trailer was also released in the same event.

== Reception ==
=== Box office ===
Majili collected a total gross of ₹28.15 crores and share of ₹17.35 Crores in the first weekend, and became biggest opener in Naga Chaitanya's career. In just five days, the movie collected a total gross of ₹40 Crores and share of ₹21.50 Crores worldwide, and recovered 100 percent of its distributors' investments.

In the first week, it collected a total gross of ₹45.60 Crores and share of ₹27.85 Crores worldwide.

In 10 days, it collected a total share of ₹32.93 Crores worldwide.

In 28 days, it collected a total gross of ₹68.05 Crores and a share of ₹38.52 Crores worldwide. Movie collected ₹40 Crores share and ₹70 Crores gross worldwide in 30 days.

It collected US$140,454 through premiers in United States.

=== Critical reception ===
On the review aggregator website Rotten Tomatoes, 80% of 5 critics' reviews are positive, with an average rating of 5/10.

NDTV gave 3.5 out of 5 stars stating "Seamless in its emotional velocity, Majili neatly weaves together the fluctuating fortunes of three messy lives. There is nothing here that we haven't seen before. But then, who said life is all about constantly finding new experiences? Exploring the inner spaces of the man-woman mythology, Majili hits on a narrative that's moving and rewarding". Firstpost gave 3.5 out of 5 stars stating "Majili is an honest portrayal of relationships. With some terrific performances by its cast, Vishnu Sarma’s cinematography, and fine writing from Shiva Niravana, the film turns into an enriching experience. It does leave you with a hangover of pain and love. Two big thumbs up". News18 gave 3.5 out of 5 stars stating "The film about losing love and finding faith, is a lengthy and fairly satisfying ode to the human heart and its vagaries." The Times of India gave 3 out of 5 stars stating "Majili takes you on a gripping rollercoaster ride, but it's a romance drama with more pain than love". IndiaGlitz gave 3 out of 5 stars stating " 'Majili' is about events rather than conversations. It could have been a coming-of-age drama but it remains content with situational humour and convenient situations for the most part. Performances and a couple of other elements save the day".

== Home media ==
Gemini TV acquired the satellite rights for ₹5 crore, digital streaming rights were acquired by Amazon Prime video for ₹3.5 crore and Hindi dubbing rights were sold to Aditya Movies for ₹4 crore. The film is available for streaming on Amazon Prime video since 10 May 2019. The Hindi dubbed version was premiered on Sony Max on 7 February 2020.

== Accolades ==
Award (Note: Awards, festivals and organizations are in alphabetical order.)	Date of ceremony (Note: Date is linked to the article about the awards held that year, wherever possible.)	Category	Recipient(s)	Result	Ref.
South Indian International Movie Awards	11–12 September 2021	Best Film – Telugu	Shine Screens Productions	Nominated	
South Indian International Movie Awards	11–12 September 2021	Best Director – Telugu	Shiva Nirvana	Nominated	
South Indian International Movie Awards	11–12 September 2021	Best Actor – Telugu	Naga Chaitanya	Nominated	
South Indian International Movie Awards	11–12 September 2021	Best Female Debut – Telugu	Divyansha Kaushik	Nominated	
South Indian International Movie Awards	11–12 September 2021	Best Supporting Actor – Telugu	Suhas	Nominated	
South Indian International Movie Awards	11–12 September 2021	Best Supporting Actress – Telugu	Ananya Agarwal	Nominated	
South Indian International Movie Awards	11–12 September 2021	Best Music Director – Telugu	Gopi Sundar	Nominated	
South Indian International Movie Awards	11–12 September 2021	Best Lyricist – Telugu	Chaitanya Prasad – (for "Priyathama Priyathama")	Nominated	
South Indian International Movie Awards	11–12 September 2021	Best Female Playback Singer – Telugu	Chinmayi – (for "Priyathama Priyathama")	Won	
Zee Cine Awards Telugu	11 January 2020	Best Actor – Female	Samantha Ruth Prabhu	Won	
Zee Cine Awards Telugu	11 January 2020	Best Playback Singer – Female	Chinmayi – (for "Priyathama Priyathama")	Won	
Sakshi Excellence Awards	2019	Most popular singer of the year	Chinmayi - (for "Priyathama Priyathama")	Won	
Santosham Film Awards	14th November 2021	Best Story Writer	Shiva Nirvana	Won	
