= Bhagavanth Kesari =

2023 Indian film by Anil Ravipudi

- Theatrical release poster
- Directed by: Anil Ravipudi
- Written by: Anil Ravipudi
- Produced by: Sahu Garapati; Harish Peddi
- Starring: Nandamuri Balakrishna; Arjun Rampal; Kajal Aggarwal; Sreeleela
- Cinematography: C. Ramprasad
- Edited by: Tammiraju
- Music by: Thaman S
- Production company: Shine Screens
- Release date: 19 October 2023
- Running time: 163 minutes
- Country: India
- Language: Telugu
- Budget: est. ₹65–100 crore
- Box office: est. ₹130 crore

Bhagavanth Kesari is a 2023 Indian Telugu-language action comedy drama film written and directed by Anil Ravipudi and produced by Sahu Garapati and Harish Peddi, under the banner of Shine Screens. This was the last film Harish Peddi produced under the banner of Shine Screens. It stars Nandamuri Balakrishna in the titular role alongside Arjun Rampal (in his Telugu debut), Kajal Aggarwal, and Sreeleela. The soundtrack and background score was composed by Thaman S, while C. Ramprasad and Tammiraju handled the cinematography and editing, respectively.

The film was theatrically released on 19 October 2023, on the occasion of Dusshera. The film received mixed to positive reviews from critics, praising its women-centric theme, Balakrishna's performance and the action.

Bhagavanth Kesari earned the Best Feature Film in Telugu at the 71st National Film Awards, and the Telangana state Gaddar Award for Third Best Feature Film. The film was remade in Tamil as Jana Nayagan (2026).

== Plot ==
Nelakonda Bhagavanth Kesari is an ex-prisoner who becomes the guardian of Vijayalakshmi "Viji" after the death of his friend and Viji's father, CI Srikanth in an accident. Bhagavanth wants her to join the Indian Army as per her father's wish and seeks the help of psychologist Dr. Kathyayani. However, Viji is against joining the Army, stemming from a phobia in her childhood; she is keen on marrying her boyfriend, Karthik.

Meanwhile, Rahul Sanghvi is a crime boss and illegitimate businessman, who seeks to steal the country's prestigious project-V, but the Deputy CM accumulates incriminating evidence against him. Rahul assassinates him, but his PA absconds with the evidence, and Rahul is behind his hunt. Karthik proceeds with his parents with the proposal, but Bhagavanth denies it, for which Viji starts to detest Bhagavanth. While escaping from Rahul's men, the PA fortuitously uses Viji's laptop to secure the data, and Rahul's men target her instead. Bhagavanth learns about this and shields Viji. Rahul is shocked upon seeing Bhagavanth, revealing that the two are past rivals, and Viji soon learns about Bhagavanth's past.

Past: Bhagavanth is a gallant Circle Inspector at a tribal zone called Nelakonda, where he locks horns with Rahul's politician father Sarath Sanghvi after he massacres the forest department. Bhagavanth outrageously butchers his men and publicly arrests Sarath, who later commits suicide. To exact vengeance, Rahul incriminates Bhagavanth under trumped-up charges and has him sentenced to prison.

Present: After learning this, Viji oaths to fulfill Bhagavanth's ambition. They go to Hyderabad along with Kathyayani and admit Viji to a training academy where the coach disdains the women but later accepts an apology after Bhagavanth glorifies their eminence. Viji cannot climb her last leg because of neurosis, whereas Kathyayani provides insight to raise her mental strength and courage. Rahul intends to kill Bhagavanth and his loved ones whilst also capturing the PA. However, Bhagavanth tarnishes Rahul's plans with the support of Ratan Shukla, whom he befriended in prison, and procures the evidence from the PA. Bhagavanth makes a deal with the politicians to schedule a dual war with Rahul and receives approval. As directed by Kathyayani, Bhagavanth keeps himself at risk, and Viji soon turns violent to safeguard him. Bhagavanth finally kills Rahul and his men, while Viji is selected into the Army, fulfilling her father's and Bhagavanth's dream.

== Cast ==
- Nandamuri Balakrishna as Nelakonda Bhagavanth Kesari, an ex-cop from Adilabad.
- Kajal Aggarwal as Dr. Kathyayani, Bhagavanth's love interest (voice dubbed by Savitha Reddy)
- Arjun Rampal as Rahul Sanghavi, a mafia leader
- Sreeleela as Vijaya Lakshmi "Viji"
  - Baby Nainika as Young Viji
- R. Sarathkumar as CI Srikanth, Viji's late father and Bhagavanth's late friend (guest appearance)
- Pallak Lalwani as a reporter (Cameo Appearance)
- Jayachitra as Bhagavanth's mother (Cameo Appearance)
- P. Ravi Shankar as Umesh Dutt's friend
- John Vijay as Ratan Shukla, Bhagavanth's friend
- Aadukalam Naren as Sarath Sanghvi, Rahul's father
- Subbaraju as SP Ravi Krishna IPS
- Subhalekha Sudhakar as Deputy CM
- Srinivas Vadlamani as CM
- Brahmaji as Deputy CM's PA
- Raghu Babu as Minister
- VTV Ganesh as Minister
- Rahul Ravi as Karthik, Viji's boyfriend
- Bharath Reddy as Viji's trainer
- Sanjay Swaroop as Umesh Dutt
- Raj Tirandasu as Japatri, Bhagavanth's friend
- Muralidhar Goud as Jogi
- Dubbing Janaki as Kathyayani's mother
- Srikanth Iyengar as Karthik's father
- Sravan Raghavendra as Vicky
- Rathika Rose as English-Speaking Party Member
- Racha Ravi as Lorry Driver
- Jeevan Kumar Naidu as Daggad Diwakar
- Danny Kuttappa as Rahul's henchman
- Sasidhar as Police Officer
- Meka Ramakrishna as Sentry Narayana
- Chitti Babu
- Anand Raj
- Krishna Chaitanya
- Brahmayya
- Mayank Parakh
- Alok Jain
- Koya Kishore
- Anil Ravipudi in a cameo appearance
- Bhanu Master in a cameo appearance
- Pullayya Pantulu Mylavarapu as Navy Officer
- Lakshmi Gopalaswamy as Viji's late mother (portrait)

== Production ==
Filming started on 8 December 2022 in Hyderabad alongside the puja ceremony. The film's official title was revealed in June 2023. The song "Ichi Pad Ichi Pad" was shot in Ramoji Film City in July 2025. Arjun Rampal completed filming his scenes in August 2023. Filming was wrapped by September 2023.

== Music ==
Bhagavanth Kesari

Soundtrack album by Thaman S
- Released: 8 November 2023
- Recorded: 2023
- Genre: Feature film soundtrack
- Length: 21:22
- Language: Telugu
- Label: Junglee Music
- Producer: Thaman S

Thaman S chronology
Skanda (2023)	Bhagavanth Kesari (2023)	Annapoorani: The Goddess of Food (2023)

The soundtrack and background score is composed by Thaman S, which marks his fourth collaboration with Balakrishna after Dictator (2016), Akhanda (2021), and Veera Simha Reddy (2023); first collaboration with Ravipudi. The first single titled "Ganesh Anthem, was released on 1 September 2023. The second single, "Uyyaalo Uyyaala" was released on 4 October 2023. The third single, "Roar of Kesari" was released on 17 October 2023.

All music is composed by Thaman S.

No.	Title	Lyrics	Singer(s)	Length
1.	"Ganesh Anthem"	Kasarla Shyam	Kareemullah, Maneesha Pandranki	4:36
2.	"Uyyaalo Uyyaala"	Anantha Sriram	S. P. Charan	4:16
3.	"Roar Of Kesari"	Kasarla Shyam	Chorus	3:18
4.	"Maanu Maaku"	Anantha Sriram	Keerthana Srinivas	2:20
5.	"Ichi Pad Ichi Pad"	Kaasarla Shyam	Anthony Daasan, Geetha Madhuri, Sahithi Chaganti, Naresh Mamindla	3:42
6.	"Jhagada Jhagada"	Ramajogayya Sastry	Jyoti Nooran	2:57

== Release ==
=== Theatrical ===
The film was theatrically released on 19 October 2023, coinciding with Dasara.

=== Home media ===
The film's digital streaming rights were brought by Amazon Prime Video for ₹18 crore, while the satellite rights were brought by Zee Network in all languages (Expect Hindi Language), The film was premiered on Amazon Prime Video on 24 November 2023 in Telugu, along with dubbed versions in Tamil, Malayalam, Kannada, and Hindi.

== Reception ==
=== Critical response ===
The film received mixed to positive reviews from critics praising Balakrishna's performance and action sequences.

Raghu Bandi of The Indian Express gave 2.5/5 and wrote "Bhagavanth Kesari tries hard not to be a regular Nandamuri Balakrishna movie, while having all the signature moments die-hard fans will expect from him." Sangeetha Devi Dundoo of The Hindu wrote "Anil Ravipudi's Bhagavanth Kesari starring Nandamuri Balakrishna oscillates between hypermasculine action and an emotional drama that hammers the message of women empowerment."

Janani K of India Today gave a rating of 2.5/5 and wrote, "Bhagavanth Kesari is an enjoyable entertainer where you see Balayya teaching a bunch of school children about good touch and bad touch. It's a film that has a mix of everything for the audiences." Jahnavi of The News Minute gave a rating of 1.5/5 and wrote "But even as a formulaic film hinging on the heroism of the male star, the formula itself is confusing." Eenadu reviewed the movie and noted that, aside from a few scenes in the first half, the film is commendable. Ram Venkat Srikar of Film Companion wrote, "Bhagavanth Kesari is a pretty entertaining outing from both Balakrishna and Anil Ravipudi. Despite having some issues, it works pretty well to a large extent, offering us an action entertainer with its heart in the right place, which surprises on the emotion and the 'message' front.

== Accolades ==
Award (Note: Awards, festivals and organizations are in alphabetical order.)	Date of ceremony (Note: Date is linked to the article about the awards held that year, wherever possible.)	Category	Recipient(s)	Result	Ref.
71st National Film Awards		Best Feature Film in Telugu	Producers:Sahu Garapati and Harish Peddi; Director: Anil Ravipudi	Won	
Filmfare Awards South	3 August 2024	Best Director – Telugu	Anil Ravipudi	Nominated	
Filmfare Awards South	3 August 2024	Best Actor – Telugu	Balakrishna	Nominated	
Filmfare Awards South	3 August 2024	Best Supporting Actress – Telugu	Sreeleela	Nominated	
IIFA Utsavam	27 September 2024	Best Film – Telugu	Sahu Garapati, Harish Peddi	Nominated	
IIFA Utsavam	27 September 2024	Best Director – Telugu	Anil Ravipudi	Won	
IIFA Utsavam	27 September 2024	Best Actor – Telugu	Balakrishna	Nominated	
IIFA Utsavam	27 September 2024	Best Actress – Telugu	Sreeleela	Nominated	
Santosham Film Awards	2 December 2023	Best Cinematographer	Ram Prasad	Won	
South Indian International Movie Awards	14 September 2024	Best Film – Telugu	Sahu Garapati, Harish Peddi	Won	
South Indian International Movie Awards	14 September 2024	Best Director – Telugu	Anil Ravipudi	Nominated	
South Indian International Movie Awards	14 September 2024	Best Actor	Balakrishna	Nominated	
South Indian International Movie Awards	14 September 2024	Best Actress – Telugu	Sreeleela	Nominated	
South Indian International Movie Awards	14 September 2024	Best Actor in a Negative Role – Telugu	Arjun Rampal	Nominated	

== Partial remake ==
Bhagavanth Kesari was partial remade in Tamil as Jana Nayagan, directed by H. Vinoth and starring Vijay. It was first confirmed by producer Sahu Garapati and later by director H. Vinoth.
