= Vasantha Mullai =

2023 film by Ramanan Purushothama

- Theatrical release poster
- Directed by: Ramanan Purushothama
- Written by: Ramanan Purushothama
- Screenplay by: Ramanan Purushothama; Ponnivalavan
- Produced by: Rajani Talluri; Reshmi Menon
- Starring: Bobby Simha; Kashmira Pardeshi
- Cinematography: Gopi Amarnath
- Edited by: Vivek Harshan
- Music by: Rajesh Murugesan
- Release date: 10 February 2023
- Country: India
- Language: Tamil
- Budget: ₹10 crores
- Box office: est.2 crores

Vasantha Mullai (transl. Spring jasmine) is a 2023 Indian Tamil-language psychological action thriller film written and directed by Ramanan Purushothama, and produced by Rajani Talluri and Reshmi Menon under, SRT Entertainment and Mudhra's Film Factory. It features Bobby Simha and Kashmira Pardeshi in the lead roles. It marked the last film role of Sarath Babu before his death on 22 May 2023.

It was released on 10 February 2023

== Plot ==
Rudhran, a man who works tirelessly for a successful career and money, embarks on a romantic journey to spend quality time with his girlfriend Nila. On the way, he stays at the Vasantha Mullai Motel, which takes him on a rollercoaster ride.

The movie opens with a premise about the importance of sleep. Rudhran, a software engineer, works tirelessly to make his project and company successful. He works day and night with very little sleep that he suffers blackout. Doctors advise him to take enough rest, so he leaves on a vacation along with his girlfriend Nila. They come across a motel "Vasantha Mullai", where they rent a room.

Rudhran and Nila start to get intimate, when suddenly, she gets an asthma attack. Rudhran is not able to find her life-saving inhaler. With Nila suffering with shortness of breath, Rudhran drives back to a pharmacy which he had visited on his drive. He buys the inhaler, but strange things happen when he returns to Vasantha Mullai. The receptionist does not recognize Rudhran at all; there is no record that Rudhran and Nila had checked in; and Nila is missing. Out of the blue, an assassin in a weird costume starts attacking Rudhran. Rudhran successfully defeats the assassin but not before losing his girlfriend.

More strange things are observed, indicating they are caught in a time loop, with a new set of Rudhran and his girlfriend trying to check into the hotel. The same scenes are repeated again. In the next iteration of the time loop, the assassin reveals his face. The assassin, Bharath, accuses Rudhran of killing his daughter, which Rudhran has no idea of.

The scene cuts to the present where we see Rudhran admitted to a hospital and the doctors trying to revive him. We then see that the events that happened at Vasantha Mullai motel did not happen in reality. It is a figment of imagination played in Rudhran's mind due to issues from his sleep deprivation. The incident was triggered when a clearly disturbed Rudhran was driving to the pharmacy and caused an accident involving Bharath and his child. Though Bharath and his child were unharmed, that was not registered by Rudhran's mind. Instead, his mind registered that Bharath's child was killed and Bharath had come to seek revenge, resulting in playing out the episode at Vasantha Mullai.

At the end, doctors successfully recuperate Rudhran back to health.

== Cast ==
- Bobby Simha as Rudhran
- Kashmira Pardeshi as Nila
- Arya as Bharath (cameo appearance)
- Rakshit Shetty as Bharath (Kannada version) (cameo appearance)
- Sarath Babu as Doctor
- Kochu Preman as Hotel Owner
- Rama Prabha as Hotel Owner's wife
- Riya Manoj as Laya
- Jason as Doctor
- Mona Bedre as Doctor
- Deepak Parameshwar as Rishi
- Mohan Babu as Rudhran's friend
- Adithya Shivpink as Rudhran's friend
- Gireesh Krish Nair as IT Project Manager

== Production ==
The project was announced in November 2019, with shoot beginning during the following month. The film was largely shot by November 2020 across Vagamon and Chennai. In the Tamil version, Arya was signed to portray a guest role, while Rakshit Shetty performed the same role of the Kannada version.

== Soundtrack ==
Soundtrack was composed by Rajesh Murugesan.

- Avalo Avalo - Gowtham Bharadwaj
- Vaanmegam - Vijay Yesudas, Shakthisree Gopalan
- Theeratha Raakaalam - Arivu
- Kondridu Vaazhave - Sivam
- Naan Yaar - Rajesh Murugesan

== Reception ==
Logesh Balachandran from The Times of India noted "Bobby Simha tries his best to save this mediocre thriller", adding " the idea that it adopts is decent enough to grab the attention of the viewers", "but then, mediocre storyline and unrealistic conflicts make this an average watch". Navein Darshan from Cinema Express rated the film 2/5 and wrote "this well-shot film needed invested writing".
