= The Freelancer (TV series) =

Indian action thriller series

- Genre: Drama-Thriller
- Created by: Neeraj Pandey
- Based on: A Ticket To Syria by Shirish Thorat
- Written by: Neeraj Pandey; Ritesh Shah
- Directed by: Bhav Dhulia
- Starring: Mohit Raina; Anupam Kher; Kashmira Pardeshi; Sushant Singh; Farrhana Bhatt
- Theme music composer: Sanjoy Chowdhury
- Country of origin: India
- Original language: Hindi
- No. of seasons: 1
- No. of episodes: 7

Production
- Executive producers: Gaurav Banerjee; Mahesh Menon; Varun Malik
- Producer: Shital Bhatia
- Production location: India
- Cinematography: Arvind Singh; Sudheer Palsane
- Editor: Praveen Kathikuloth
- Camera setup: Multi-camera
- Running time: 30-60 minutes
- Production company: Friday Storytellers

Original release
- Network: Disney+ Hotstar
- Release: 1 September 2023

The Freelancer is an Indian Hindi-language action thriller television series created and co-written by Neeraj Pandey, along with Ritesh Shah, and directed by Bhav Dhulia. Based on Shirish Thorat's 2017 novel A Ticket to Syria, the series follows Avinash Kamath, a former police officer turned military freelancer, as he undertakes a mission to rescue his friend's daughter from ISIS captivity in Syria.

Produced by Shital Bhatia under the banner of Friday Storytellers, the series stars Mohit Raina, Anupam Kher, and Kashmira Pardeshi in lead roles. It premiered on Disney+ Hotstar on September 1, 2023, and marks the second collaboration between Bhav Dhulia and Neeraj Pandey after Khakee: The Bihar Chapter (2022).

== Plot ==
Inayat Khan and Avinash Kamath, both Mumbai Police officers, are dismissed from the force after Avinash slaps a corrupt politician who attempts to coerce them into covering up his son’s crimes. Following their dismissal, Avinash becomes a military freelancer, while Inayat struggles to find employment. Over time, the two lose contact.

Inayat’s daughter Aliya marries Mohsin Fazal, a man from a wealthy family in Malaysia. While they are a liberal family at first, they come under the influence of a lady Islamic preacher Farhat Khala who radicalises them. Some time after the marriage, the Fazal family travels to Turkey and subsequently crosses into Syria to join ISIS. Although Aliya opposes their actions, she is forced to accompany her husband and his family. Inayat loses communication with Aliya and, after receiving no support from the Mumbai Police due to his dishonourable discharge, stages a false security incident outside the U.S. Consulate in Mumbai, leading to his death. He hopes the incident will garner media attention and prompt Avinash to help rescue Aliya.

Avinash, upon learning of Inayat’s death, visits his widow Sabeena, who informs him about Aliya’s situation. Investigating further, Avinash discovers that the Fazal family had been radicalised by Farhat Khala. Aliya manages to contact her mother from Syria, and Sabeena relays this information to Avinash. He then initiates a mission to rescue Aliya from captivity.

== Cast ==
- Mohit Raina as Avinash Damodharan Kamath / The Freelancer: Mrunal's husband
- Anupam Kher as Dr. Arif Ajmaal Khan
- Kashmira Pardeshi as Aleeya Khan / Rukhsaar Ahmed / Sonia Shah, Inayat and Sabeena's daughter
- Ayesha Raza Mishra as Sabeena Khan née Anwar: Aliya's mother; Inayat's wife
- Manjari Fadnis as Mrunal Kamath née Chikate: Avinash's wife
- Sarah-Jane Dias as CIA Agent Radha Lampat Baxi
- Sushant Singh as Inayat Khan, Aliya's father; Sabeena's husband
- Jeniffer Piccinato as Miriam, Avinash's lawyer
- Arnav Maggo as Sameer Fazal
- Navneet Malik as Mohsin Fazal: Aliya's husband
- Geeta Agrawal Sharma as Asar Fazal
- Hardika Sharma as Child Aliya
- Edward Sonnenblick as Burt Raphael
- Karan Sharma as Afsaar
- Danny Clifford as Buzz Jones
- Mario Silva as Sheikh Khaleel
- Balaji Gauri as Farhat Khala
- John Kokken as Intelligence officer Raghavendra Sethu
- Aakash Dabhade as Wilson
- Sairi Salma as Nadia Khadki
- Emma Brain as Dr Janice
- Sangay Tsheltrim as Gurung Thapa, Nepali free lancer
- Jalila Talemsi as Amena
- Anouar Akerrmann as Ritchie
- Sami Fekkak as The Photographer
- Youssef Tounzi as Registration officer 1
- Faycal Zeglat as Registration officer 2
- Varun Pande
- Shahid Lateef
- Ujjawal Gauraha as Janitor in Dubai
- Farrhana Bhatt as Sayema Faisal

== Production ==
The series was announced on Disney+ Hotstar by Friday Storytellers, and features Mohit Raina in the titular role, Anupam Kher and Kashmira Pardeshi as the lead. It is based on Shirish Thorat's A Ticket to Syria (2017). The principal photography of the series commenced in 2022 and wrapped up in 2023. The series is set in Syria and was primarily shot in Mumbai, Morocco, Europe, America, and the Middle East. The trailer of the series was released on 8 August 2023.

== Reception ==
Archika Khurana of The Times of India rated it 3.5 out of 5 and wrote, "Without a doubt, 'The Freelancer' adds another success to Neeraj Pandey's portfolio. It's a must-watch for its engaging plot, tension-filled atmosphere, and effective storytelling, which captivate viewers throughout." Sunidhi Prajapat of OTT Play rated the series 3.5/5 stars. Deepa Gahlot of Rediff.com rated the series 2.5/5 stars.

Anuj Kumar of The Hindu wrote, "Bereft of high-octane action or deep insight, this thriller created by Neeraj Pandey feels formulaic and farcical" Shubhra Gupta of The Indian Express wrote, "This should have been, at the very least, a serviceable thriller, given that it has Neeraj Pandey (Special Ops, Baby) as creator, and Bhav Dhulia as director. But it makes us wait for its thrills, more a matter of occasional chattering guns, with Avinash once even besting the Mossad, no less, than clever manoeuvring on the field. That cat-and-mouse feeling of danger is missing."

== See also ==
- List of Disney+ Hotstar original programming
