= Rider (2021 film) =

2021 film by Vijay Kumar Konda

- Directed by: Vijay Kumar Konda
- Written by: Vijai Prakash; Nandyala Ravi
- Story by: Vijay Kumar Konda
- Produced by: Sunil Gowda
- Starring: Nikhil Gowda Kashmira Pardeshi Anusha Rai Achyuth Kumar Ramachandra Raju Shobaraj Dattanna Chikkanna
- Cinematography: Shreesha Kuduvalli
- Edited by: K. M. Prakash
- Music by: Arjun Janya
- Production company: Lahari Films
- Distributed by: Shiva Nandi Entertainments
- Release date: 24 December 2021
- Running time: 145 Minutes
- Country: India
- Language: Kannada

Rider is a 2021 Indian Kannada-language romantic-action film directed by Vijay Kumar Konda and produced by Sunil Gowda. The film stars Nikhil Gowda and Kashmira Pardeshi in lead roles. Anusha Rai, Dattanna, Achyuth Kumar and Chikkanna in supporting roles. The film was dubbed in Telugu under the same name.

== Plot ==
In Bangalore, Surya aka Kitty is an orphan, who becomes a basketball player. Surya is in search of his childhood friend Chinnu, whom he met at his orphanage years ago. Soumya aka Chinnu is an NRI in Australia, who is the boss of the company where Surya works. Sowmya/Chinnu learns that Surya/Kitty is in Bangalore from a short film and seeks the help of short filmmaker Chikku to identify Surya. The two decide to meet each other at the orphanage where they met. However, The orphanage is destroyed due to village floods.

Soumya's parents fixes her marriage with their business partner's son. On her wedding day, Soumya consumes poison where she learns Surya's identity as Kitty through a video call sent by Surya as he went to Australia for basketball championship. Sowmya loses consciousness before she leaves to meet Surya. Surya learns Sowmya's identity as Chinnu (when he sees Sowmya's signature which resembles a pigeon that they have created in childhood) and leaves to stop her wedding, but is knocked by the henchmen of Industrialist JD.

Surya had actually saved an Inspector, who wants to learn where Sowmya lives, However, The Inspector is actually in-charge to investigate JD's land case. Surya wakes up in the hospital and learns that Sowmya is in the same hospital and goes to meet her. JD arrives at the hospital to kill Surya, but spares him after learning his story and desperation to find Sowmya. Surya meets Sowmya, who recovers and the two reconcile with each other, much to the happiness of their respective parents.

== Cast ==
- Nikhil Gowda as Surya aka Kitty
- Kashmira Pardeshi as Sowmya aka Chinnu
- Achyuth Kumar as Gangadhar, Surya's father
- Ramachandra Raju as JD
- Chikkanna as Chikku
- Shivraj K R Pete as Surya's friend
- Dattanna as Orphanage's principal
- Shobaraj as Inspector
- Rajesh Nataranga as Raghuram, Sowmya's father
- Anusha Rai as Surya's sister
- Sampada Hulivana as Reshma, Surya's fiancée

== Soundtrack ==
The music and background score were composed by Arjun Janya. Lyrics were written by Nandhyala Ravi and Vijai Prakash.

Rider

Soundtrack album by Arjun Janya
- Released: 2021
- Recorded: 2021
- Genre: Soundtrack
- Length: 10.23
- Language: Kannada
- Label: Lahari Music; T-Series
- Producer: Vijay Kumar Konda

Arjun Janya chronology
Bhajarangi 2 (2021)	Rider (2021)	Gaalipata 2 (2022)

All tracks are written by Nandyala Ravi and Vijai Prakash.

No.	Title	Lyrics	Singer(s)	Length
1.	"Davva Davva"	Chetan Kumar	Armaan Malik	3.54
2.	"Mellane"	Kaviraj	Sanjith Hegde	3.48
3.	"Baanu Bhoomi"	V. Nagendra Prasad	Vijay Prakash	3.21
Total length:				10.23

== Reception ==
Times of India critic Sunayana Suresh rated the film 3/5 and called it an "old school romance": "Rider is a film that could have been a good romantic tale, but the excessive masala fare makes it fall short of that, especially with its extended climax sequence", Suresh added. On the technical side, A Sharadhaa of Cinema Express wrote: "Rider has rich production quality, and the lavish locations add to the feel of the film. Both the music by Arjun Janya and cinematography by Shreesha Kuduvalli elevate the film."

Deccan Herald's Jagadish Angadi felt it a "messy romantic tale" and stated, "Rider reminds us of an inexperienced boy riding a bike on the highway with massive speed, unaware of his destination." Writing for Kannada Prabha, Priya Kerwashe gave a positive review for the film, appreciating the performances and entertainment quotient.
