= Vinaro Bhagyamu Vishnu Katha =

2023 film by Murali Kishor Abburu

- Directed by: Murali Kishor Abburu
- Written by: Murali Kishor Abburu
- Produced by: Bunny Vas
- Starring: Kiran Abbavaram; Kashmira Pardeshi; Murali Sharma
- Cinematography: Viswas Daniel
- Edited by: Marthand K. Venkatesh
- Music by: Chaitan Bharadwaj
- Production company: GA2 Pictures
- Release date: 18 February 2023
- Running time: 143 minutes
- Country: India
- Language: Telugu
- Box office: est. ₹11.07 crore

Vinaro Bhagyamu Vishnu Katha (transl. Blessed to Hear Vishnu's story) is a 2023 Indian Telugu-language romantic action comedy thriller film written and directed by debutant Murali Kishor Abburu and produced by Bunny Vas of GA2 Pictures. It features Kiran Abbavaram, Kashmira Pardeshi and Murali Sharma in primary roles. The film received generally positive reviews and became a success at the box office.

== Premise ==
Vishnu, a librarian based in Tirupati, loves helping people since childhood. One day, Darshana, an aspiring YouTuber from Tiruchanur, calls Vishnu as his phone number neighbor and asks him to meet her. They meet another neighbor, Markhandeya Sarma, who also joins them, and the trio gradually becomes friends. In a turn of events, Darshana unknowingly kills Sarma while trying to make a prank video. Vishnu, who believes that Darshana is innocent, begins to investigate and prove Darshana's innocence along with working with a team of agents to take down a gangster.

== Cast ==
- Kiran Abbavaram as Vishnu
- Kashmira Pardeshi as Darshana alias "Daring" Darshana
- Murali Sharma as Markhandeya Sarma
- Subhalekha Sudhakar as Vishnu's grandfather
- L. B. Sriram as Vishnu’s co-worker
- Aamani as Dharshana’s mother
- Sharath Lohitashwa as Rajan
- Praveen as Balaji, Vishnu’s friend
- Devi Prasad as Dharshana’s father
- Mathew Varghese as NIA head
- Tarak Ponnappa as NIA Officer Anwar
- Bharath Reddy as NIA officer Ajay
- Lakki Lakshman as Minister C. R.
- Pammi Sai as Ekantam, C. R.’s assistant
- Vadlamani Srinivas as SI Bharadwaj
- Master Bhanu as young Vishnu
- Kiran as aggipetti macha

== Music ==
The music is composed by Chaitan Bharadwaj. The audio rights were acquired by Aditya Music.

Track list
No.	Title	Lyrics	Singer(s)	Length
1.	"Vaasava Suhaasa"	Kalyan Chakravarthy Tripuraneni	Karunya	2:28
2.	"Oh Bangaram"	Bhaskarabhatla	Kapil Kapilan	3:48
3.	"Darshana"	Bhaskarabhatla	Anurag Kulkarni
4.	"Chukkalettu Kondale"	Kalyan Chakravarthy Tripuraneni	Anurag Kulkarni
5.	"Pravasanni"	Kalyan Chakravarthy Tripuraneni	Hymath Mohammed
Total length:				16:09

== Release ==
Vinaro Bhagyamu Vishnu Katha was released theatrically on 18 February 2023. Digital streaming rights were obtained by Aha where it premiered on 22 March 2023.

== Reception ==
Sangeetha Devi Dundoo of The Hindu cited the film as "a concoction of absurd ideas" and further stated: "Kiran Abbavaram’s expressions and dialogue delivery remain pretty much the same through the film". Jeevi of Idlebrain gave a rating of 2.75 out of 5 and praised screenplay of climax scenes in the film. He further stated "VBVK is a multi-genre film with an interesting premise".
