= Sivappu Manjal Pachai =

2019 film directed by Sasi

- Theatrical release poster
- Directed by: Sasi
- Written by: Sasi
- Produced by: Ramesh P. Pillai
- Starring: Siddharth; G. V. Prakash Kumar; Lijomol Jose; Kashmira Pardeshi
- Cinematography: Prasanna Kumar
- Edited by: San Lokesh
- Music by: Siddhu Kumar
- Production company: Abhishek Films
- Release date: 6 September 2019
- Running time: 142 minutes
- Country: India
- Language: Tamil

Sivappu Manjal Pachai (transl. Red, yellow, green) is a 2019 Indian Tamil-language action thriller film written and directed by Sasi. The film stars Siddharth, G. V. Prakash Kumar, Lijomol Jose, and Kashmira Pardeshi, and marks the Tamil film debuts of both Lijomol and Pardeshi. The film is produced by Ramesh P. Pillai under the banner of Abhishek Films. Principal photography of the film commenced in July 2018. The film was released on 6 September 2019 to positive reviews and became a hit at the box office.

== Plot ==
Madhan (G. V. Prakash Kumar), is a brash street racer who lives in Chennai with his loving elder sister Raji or Poonai (Lijomol Jose). They were orphaned in childhood. They are living with their aunt Dhanalakshmi (Nakkalites Dhanam). He has a love interest named Kavin (Kashmira Pardeshi). Rajashekar (Siddharth), is a stern traffic police officer. Sparks fly between them in the beginning of the film itself when Rajasekar nabs Madhan on the road for racing and humiliates him in public by putting a girls dress on him. When a marriage alliance is formed between Raji and Rajashekar, things become tense. Madhan is not able to put the humiliation behind him and begins to see Rajasekar and Raji as his worst enemies, as Raji marries Rajashekar against his wishes and becomes pregnant for two months. Madhan's bike also gets stolen. The police arrests him and beats him up as the bike is used for chain snatching. Rajashekar comes to his rescue and agrees to keep him in his home, after which follows a melodrama between Madhan and Raji.

Enters Madhu (Madhusudhan Rao), a rich drug dealer. One of his drug-carrying trucks is nabbed by Rajashekar. Rajashekar seeks the help of the central vigilance team to seize Madhu's drugs and arrest him. Madhu orders his men to ram the van carrying him by a lorry and escapes from the hospital where he is admitted. Meanwhile, Madhan and Raji learned that their aunt passes away and they mourn her death. After her death, their cousin requested to exchange the jewellery that given by Dhanam for Raji's marriage. At the same time, Madhan finds out the thieves. The thief (Yeshwanth), also in Madhan's opposite gang, refuses to surrender due to his political influence and lack of enough evidence. The thief challenges Madhan to a bet race with him and tells him that he will surrender if Madhan wins, and his bike will be restored back to him. However, in the race, the thief badly injures Madhan. Rajashekar helps Madhan win the race, and he gets back his bike. Later, Madhu's goons kidnap both Rajashekar and Madhan. In a fight that ensues, Rajashekar kills two of Madhu's goons and gets shot in a bid to save Madhan. Madhan realizes his mistake for developing grudge against Raji and, in retaliation, kills all the goons and leaves Madhu to get arrested.

The film ends happily with Madhan and Rajashekar getting united.

== Cast ==
- Siddharth as Rajashekar "Raj"
- G. V. Prakash Kumar as Madhan
- Lijomol Jose as Rajalakshmi (Raji / "Punai"), Rajashekar's wife, Madhan's elder sister
- Kashmira Pardeshi as Kavin, Madhan's lover
- Nakkalites Dhanam as Dhanalakshmi (Dhanam)
- Madhusudhan Rao as Madhu
- Dheepa Ramanujam as Vijayalakshmi, Rajasekhar's mother
- Prem as Rajasekar's elder brother
- Sathish Ekisa as Rajasekar's younger brother
- Yeshwanth as Thief
- Bijili Ramesh as Drunkard
- Rithu Manthra

== Production ==
The official confirmation of the film's title Sivappu Manjal Pachai was revealed by the filmmakers on 8 March 2019 along with a poster and with an indication that the film would be released around summer 2019. the shooting of actor prem was wrapped on 15 March 2019. The whole film's shoot was wrapped on 24 March 2019.

Siddharth was signed in to play the role of a traffic policeman while G. V. Prakash Kumar plays a street racer. The filmmakers roped in Malayalam actress Lijomol Jose in her Kollywood debut to play the role of G. V. Prakash's character's sister and the love interest of Siddharth's character, while newcomer Kashmira Pardeshi was hired to play the second female lead.

== Soundtrack ==
Sivappu Manjal Pachai

Soundtrack album by Siddhu Kumar
- Released: 15 May 2019
- Studio: Krimson Avenue Studios
- Genre: Soundtrack
- Length: 19:45
- Language: Tamil
- Label: Think Music
- Producer: Siddhu Kumar

Siddhu Kumar chronology
Sivappu Manjal Pachai (2019)	Trip (2021)

The soundtrack of the film was composed by debutant Siddhu Kumar with lyrics written by Mohan Rajan and Dhamayanthi.

Track listing
No.	Title	Lyrics	Singer(s)	Length
1.	"Mayilaanjiye"	Dhamayanthi	Anand Aravindakshan, Shashaa Tirupati	3:18
2.	"Raakaachi Rangamma"	Mohan Rajan	Anitha Karthikeyan	4.31
3.	"Usure"	Mohan Rajan	Sudharshan Ashok, Jothi Pushpa	4:00
4.	"Idhudhaan"	Mohan Rajan	Naresh Iyer, Shashaa Tirupati	3:11
5.	"Aazhi Soozhndha"	Mohan Rajan	Sreekanth Hariharan	4:45
Total length:				19:45

== Release and reception ==
=== Release ===
The film was theatrically released on 6 September 2019.

=== Reception ===
India Today wrote "After the blockbuster hit Pichaikkaran, Sasi only manages to come up with a middling family (melo)drama that also tries to be an action film". Sify wrote "Sasi's treatment is old-school and the melodrama is pretty high, particularly in the long drawn out climax sequence. But the film may connect well with the family audience in TN. You know what to expect from a film like this, and one must admit that it delivers." Hindustan Times wrote "Filmmaker Sasi, who returns to direction after three years since the release of the highly successful Pichaikkaran, makes a well-intentioned family drama in Sivappu Manjal Pachai. The film, however, does feel bloated at places due to the overdose of melodrama. It’s one of those genuine attempts that could’ve toned down on melodrama for a stronger impact".
