= Vishwanath & Sons (soundtrack) =

2026 film soundtrack album

Soundtrack album by G. V. Prakash Kumar
- Released: 14 August 2026
- Recorded: 2026
- Studios: Divine Labs, Chennai; Sounds Right Studios, Chennai; Audiogene Sound Studios, Kochi; Vanaj Kesav Digi Audio Waves, Chennai; Harr Studios, Chennai
- Genre: Feature film soundtrack
- Length: 21:10
- Language: Tamil
- Label: Aditya Music
- Producer: G. V. Prakash Kumar

G. V. Prakash Kumar chronology
Magudam (2026)	Vishwanath & Sons (2026)	Irumudi (2026)

Singles from Vishwanath & Sons
- 1. "Pattampoochi / Neno Butterfly" Released: 19 June 2026; 2. "The Wedding Song" Released: 25 July 2026; 3. "The One Rule" Released: 3 August 2026

Vishwanath & Sons is the soundtrack album composed by G. V. Prakash Kumar to the 2026 Indian romantic family drama film of the same name directed by Venky Atluri, and produced by Suryadevara Naga Vamsi and Sai Soujanya under Sithara Entertainments, Srikara Studios and Fortune Four Cinemas starring Suriya and Mamitha Baiju. The film's soundtrack featured five songs written by Arunraja Kamaraj, Ken Karunas, Gana Kadhar and Balaji Venugopal, while the Telugu lyrics were written by Ramajogayya Sastry and Sri Mani. Led by three singles, the album was released in conjunction with the film on 14 August 2026 in Tamil and Telugu languages.

== Development ==
G. V. Prakash composed the music for Vishwanath & Sons renewing his association with Venky Atluri after Vaathi (2023) and Lucky Baskhar (2024) while also collaborating with Suriya for the second time after Soorarai Pottru (2020). Prakash considered the film to a feel good film that celebrates family relationships and he had to compose music that reflected the heartwarming nature of the story. "Pattampoochi" ("Neno Butterfly" in Telugu) was a female pop melody sung by Sublahshini and written by Arunraja Kamaraj. that was designed from a simple tune that Prakash composed when he was 12 years old. When Atluri heard the tune, he wanted to use the same melody into the song which he incorporated into it. Ken Karunas wrote "The Wedding Song" in June 2026 which featured vocals by Suriya. The elevation number "The One Rule" was performed by Gana Kadhar.

== Release ==
The audio rights were acquired by Aditya Music. A promo of the song "Pattampoochi" was released in mid-June 2026 that had Mamitha Baiju trying to perform the vocals in the recording studio. The song was released as the first single on 19 June. Another promo for the second single was teased on 23 July, coinciding Suriya's birthday. Titled "The Wedding Song", it was released two days later.

The film's audio launch was held at Hindusthan College of Arts and Science in Coimbatore on 2 August, featuring the cast and crew in attendance and musical performances by Prakash and his team. However, the album was not released in conjunction. Instead, the song "The One Rule" was released as the third single from the album, the day later. The full soundtrack was released on 14 August, coinciding the film's release in Tamil and Telugu versions.

== Reception ==
Bhuvanesh Chander of The Hindu wrote "Prakash’s music breathes fresh life into VAS, and the film’s dance choreography also catches your eye." Sreeju Sudhakaran of Rediff.com wrote "The music is another massive contributing factor, with G V Prakash Kumar's score guaranteeing every scene maintains a consistently winsome appeal." Yashaswini Sri of The Indian Express wrote "GV Prakash Kumar’s background score is one of the film’s standout elements. It is subtle when it needs to be, warm without being sweet or sentimental, and it elevates the emotional beats without drowning them."

Sasidhar Adivi of Filmfare wrote "GV Prakash Kumar’s score complements the film’s emotional beats while sharpening its dramatic and relationship-driven moments." M Suganth of The Times of India, however, stated that "The music, by GV Prakash Kumar, is a letdown, with hardly catchy songs and a weak, generic score that fails to elevate the emotional moments".

== Track listing ==
Tamil
No.	Title	Lyrics	Singer(s)	Length
1.	"Pattampoochi"	Arunraja Kamaraj	Sublahshini	3:29
2.	"The Wedding Song"	Ken Karunas	Suriya	3:16
3.	"The One Rule"	Gana Kadhar	Gana Kadhar	2:49
4.	"Paalmazhai"	Balaji Venugopal	Vidya Kalyanraman	3:44
5.	"Uyire Uyire"	Balaji Venugopal	Aditi Bhavaraju	3:26
6.	"Aariraro Aariro"	Balaji Venugopal	Mithran; R.P. Krishaang	4:26
Total length:				21:10

Telugu
No.	Title	Lyrics	Singer(s)	Length
1.	"Neno Butterfly"	Ramajogayya Sastry	Sublahshini	3:29
2.	"The Wedding Song"	Ramajogayya Sastry	Suriya	3:16
3.	"The One Rule"	Sri Mani	Rowdraa	2:48
4.	"Devaki Nandana"	Ramajogayya Sastry	Vidya Kalyanraman	3:44
5.	"Kalale Kalale"	Sri Mani	Amala Chebolu	3:27
6.	"Laali Jo"	Sri Mani	Ananth Siddharth	4:26
Total length:				21:10

== Personnel ==
Credits adapted from Aditya Music:

- Music composer, producer and arranger: G. V. Prakash Kumar
- Music programmer: Smith Asher
- Trumpets: Maxwell, Babu
- Acoustic guitar, nylon guitar, electric guitar: Sandeep Mohan
- Rhythms: Kalyan
- Shehnai: Ballesh
- Nadaswaram: Mambalam Sivakumar
- Flute: Lalit Talluri
- Violin: Sayee Rakshit
- Veena: Haritha
- Male chorus: Aravind Srinivas, Narayanan Ravishankar, Sudharsan Hemaram
- Female choirus: Aavani Malhar, Jerina Anna, Kaanjana Sreeram, Aruna Mary George, Padmaja Sreenivasan, Sushmita Narasimhan, Abinaya Shenbagaraj
- Vocal supervision: S. P. Abhishek
- Studios: Divine Labs, Chennai; Sounds Right Studios, Chennai; Audiogene Sound Studios, Kochi; Vanaj Kesav Digi Audio Waves, Chennai, Harr Studios, Chennai
- Recording engineers: Jehovahson Alghar, Roopash Tiwari, Aswin George John, Ishit Kuberkar, Sanjai Arakkal, K. K. Senthil Prasad, Shri Raman
- Pre-mixing engineer: Roopash Tiwari
- Mixing and mastering engineer: Jehovahson Alghar, Ashwin George John
- Musicians assistant: P. Rajamurugan
