= Amithash Pradhan =

Indian actor (born 1990)

- Born: 12 October 1990 (age 35); Chennai, Tamil Nadu, India
- Occupation: Actor
- Years active: 2008–present
- Father: Girish Pradhan

Amithash Pradhan (born 12 October 1990) is an Indian actor who primarily works in Tamil films.

== Career ==
Vaaranam Aayiram was his introduction to films, albeit a tiny role, just as he completed his schooling. His professional acting breakthrough came in 2014 with the Tamil film Velaiyilla Pattathari, in which he plays the role of the antagonist against Dhanush. The film went on to make waves as the highest grossing Tamil film of 2014 and Amitash got recognition for being called an "Amul" baby by Dhanush's character. Telugu film director Srinu Vaitla cast him in his Telugu film Bruce Lee - The Fighter, marking his Telugu debut.

He made his Hollywood debut in the year 2015 with playing male lead in the movie Heartbeats directed by Duane Adler of the Step Up series was a significant phase for him. He plays the role of Aseem Kapoor, an Indian choreographer with whom Krystal Ellsworth, an American dancer falls in love and the film celebrates their love and the tough path they had to tread.

He played one of the primary characters in Vaanam Kottattum (2020). He alongside Aishwarya Rajesh and Shanthanu Bhagyaraj which was bankrolled by Madras Talkies, a Mani Ratnam's production house.

He was also a part of an anthology called Kutty Story (2021) by four eminent directors of South and he featured in A. L. Vijay's episode along with Megha Akash. In the film Thalli Pogathey (2021), a remake of the Telugu film Ninnu Kori, Amithash acted as one of the leads alongside Atharvaa and Anupama Parameswaran.

His next film, Paramporul in 2023 had R. Sarathkumar and himself in the lead roles. He also made his playback singing debut with the song "Sippara Rippara", along with Shankar Mahadevan in the same film under Yuvan Shankar Raja's musical.

== Personal life ==
His father Girish Pradhan is also an actor and Amitash was named after Amitabh Bachchan while the ending of his name "sh" was taken from his father's name.

== Filmography ==
Key
†	Denotes films that have not yet been released

Year	Film	Role	Language	Notes
2008	Vaaranam Aayiram	Krishnan's college friend	Tamil	
2014	Velaiyilla Pattathari	Arun Subramaniam	Tamil	
2015	Bruce Lee - The Fighter	Rahul	Telugu	
2017	Heartbeats	Aseem Kapoor	English	
2020	Vaanam Kottatum	Kalyan Reddy	Tamil	
2021	Kutty Story	Vikram	Tamil	Amazon Prime anthology film; Segment: Avanum Naanum
2021	Thalli Pogathey	Arun	Tamil	
2022	Krishna Vrinda Vihari	Nandan	Telugu	
2023	Paramporul	Aadhi	Tamil	

As playback singer

Year	Song	Notes
2020	"Corona Kannala"	
2021	"Arakkiye"	
2023	"Sippara Rippara"	from the film Paramporul
