= Simhachalam railway station =

Railway station in Andhra Pradesh, India

Simhachalam సింహాచలం
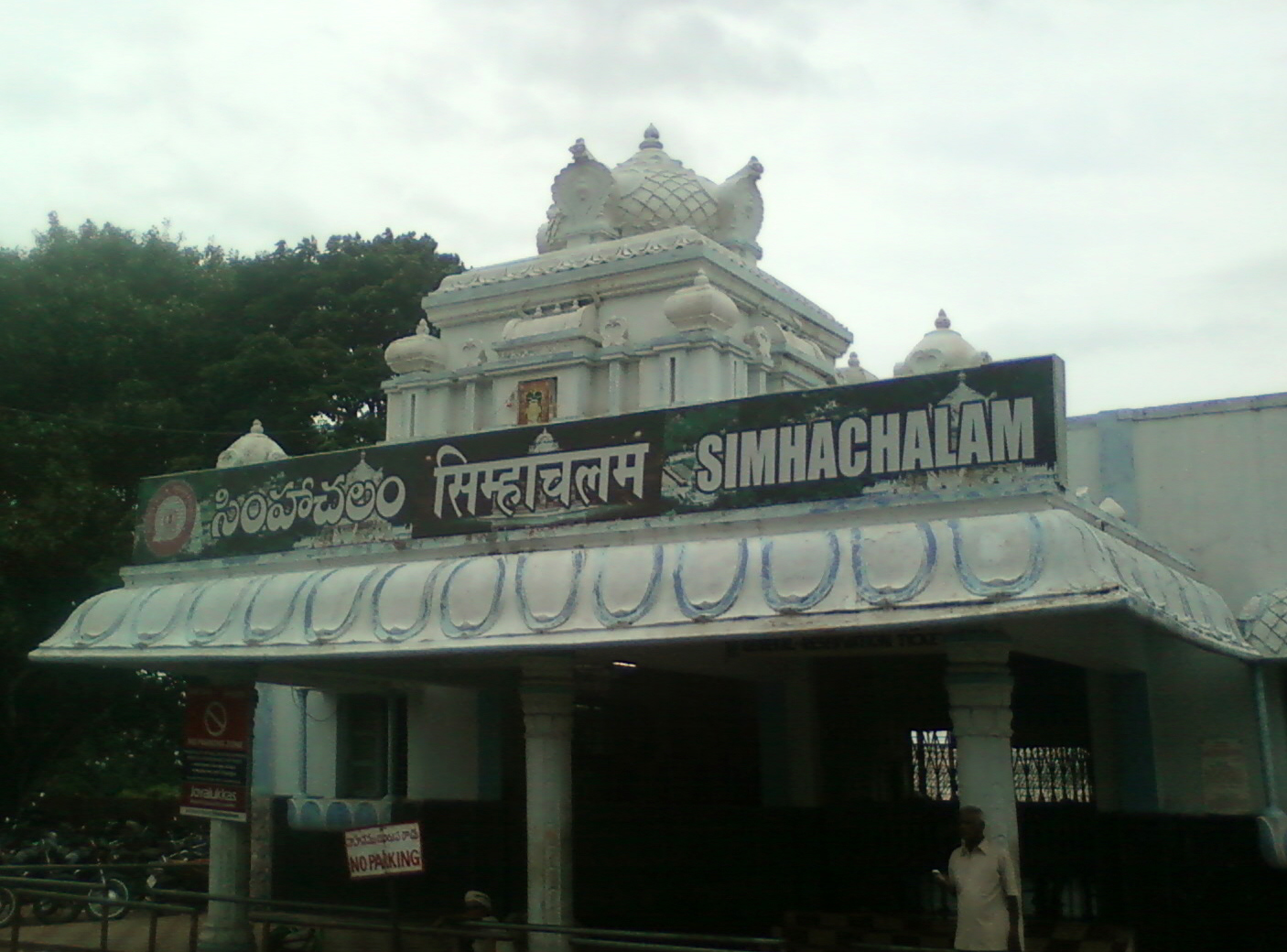

General information
- Location: Gopalapatnam, Visakhapatnam, Andhra Pradesh, 530027; India
- Coordinates: 17.7452°N 83.2208°E
- Elevation: 27 m (89 ft)
- System: Indian Railways station
- Line: Visakhapatnam–Vijayawada section of Howrah–Chennai main line
- Platforms: 2
- Tracks: 5 ft 6 in (1,676 mm) broad gauge

Construction
- Structure type: Standard (on-ground station)
- Parking: Available

Other information
- Status: Functioning
- Station code: SCM
- Zone(s): South Coast Railway
- Division(s): Visakhapatnam
Location
- Location within Visakhapatnam

Simhachalam railway station (station code:SCM), located in the Indian state of Andhra Pradesh, serves Simhachalam in Visakhapatnam district. It lies on the Howrah–Chennai main line.

== History ==
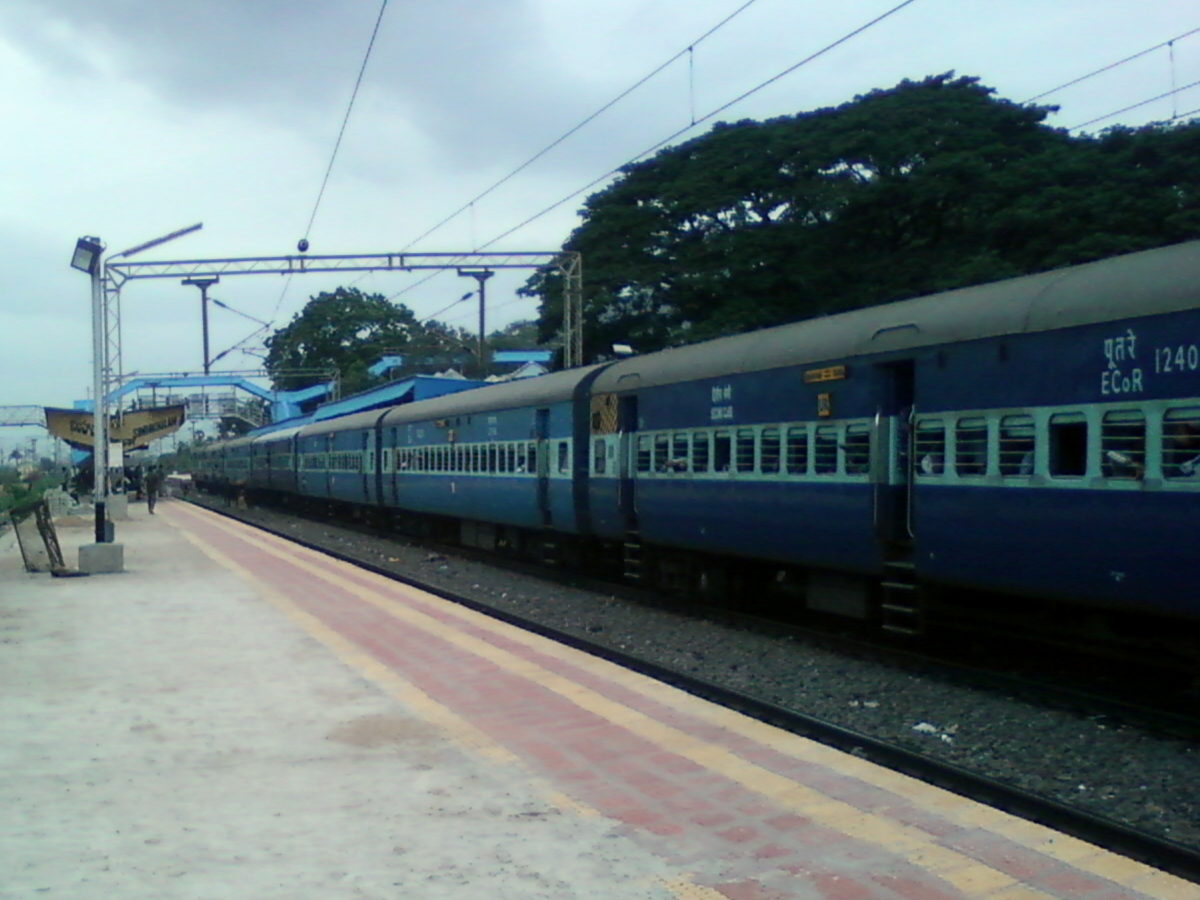
Durg–VSKP Passenger

Simhachalam railway station is third busiest railway station in Visakhapatnam after Visakhapatnam railway station and Duvvada railway station. It mainly serves purpose to reach Simhachalam and the surrounding locale.

Between 1893 and 1896, 1,288 km (800 mi) of the South Eastern Railway was opened for traffic. In 1898–99, Bengal Nagpur Railway was linked to the lines in southern India.

== Transportation ==
Simhachalam railway station is well connected to all over Visakhapatnam.

- BUSSES TO SIMHACHALAM: (28H,28,28Z/H,6A/H,55H,540,549,6H)
- BUSSES TO KOTTAVALASA: (55K,28K)
- BUSSES TO VIZAG RTC COMPLEX (BUS STATION): (6A/H,28H,12D,300C,28K,28A,28Z/H,333,555)

== See also ==
- Visakhapatnam railway division

Preceding station	Indian Railways	Following station
Marripalem towards ?	South Coast Railway zone Visakhapatnam–Vijayawada section of Howrah–Chennai main line	Pendurti towards ?
