= St. Anne's School (Pune) =

School in Pune, India

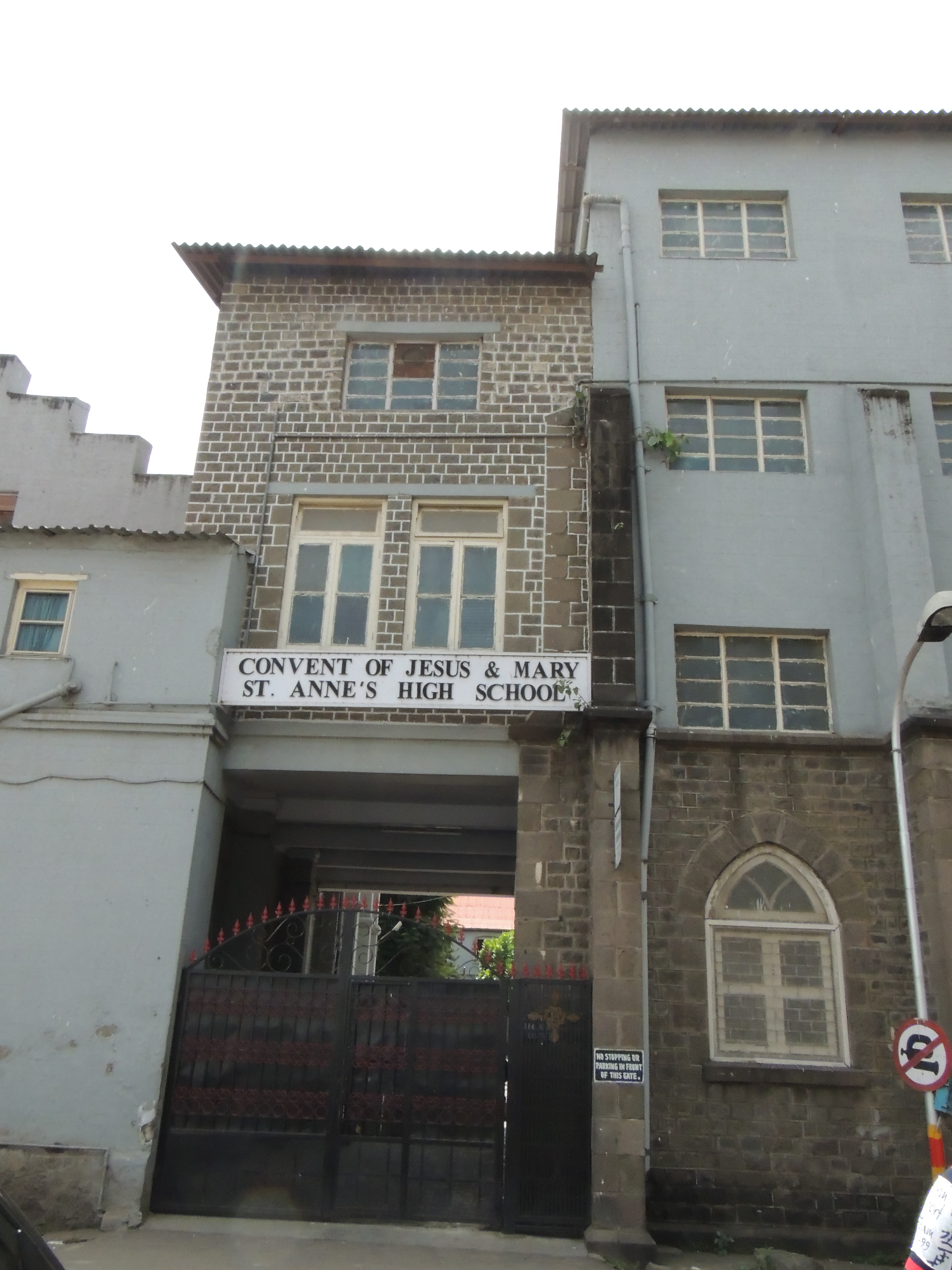
- Convent Street, Camp, Pune; India

Information
- Motto: With God For God
- Established: 1860; 166 years ago
- Grades: nursery to XII standard

St. Anne's Convent High School is a government-accredited English medium girls' school which was founded in 1860 in Camp, Pune, Maharashtra, India. The student population of 2200 attends classes between nursery grade and tenth standard. The school employs 67 teachers. The primary school (standards one to four) operates as a private entity. The secondary school (standards five to ten) is operated by the State Education Department.

St. Anne's High School which has been established by the Provincial Society of the Congregation of Jesus and Mary, Pune, is a Christian Minority Institution, which aims primarily at the education of the Catholic Community and the preservation of the Catholic faith and religious practices.

== Academic program ==
Convent of Jesus and Mary runs a private kindergarten in a breakup of two years. The kindergarten is accommodated on the same premises, but technically has no connection with the school.

The school (Std. I to X) is divided into two distinct sections.

The Primary School section (Stds. I - IV) is a Private school and the Secondary school section (Stds. V - X) functions under the State Education Department. Admission from Std. IV to V are not automatic but are based on merit.

The Secondary section follows the Maharashtra State Board of Secondary Education System, that is, the S.S.C. syllabus

The subjects taught are English as first language, Marathi, as the second language, Hindi as the third language, Mathematics, Science, Social Sciences (History/Geography). The school also offers Physical training, Value Education, Religion, Art, Craft, Information Technology, R.S.P., Personality Development, General Knowledge, Environmental Studies, Social Service, Indian and Western Music, etc.

== See also ==
- List of schools in Pune
