= Prawin Pudi =

Indian film editor (born 1984)

- Born: 1 March 1982 (age 44); Huzurnagar, Andhra Pradesh, India (now in Telangana, India)
- Occupation: Film editor
- Years active: 2010–present

Prawin Pudi (born 1 March 1982) is an Indian film editor who primarily works in Telugu cinema.

== Career ==
Prawin Pudi joined the Telugu film industry as an assistant to editor Kotagiri Venkateswara Rao in 2000, before apprenticing under A. Sreekar Prasad and Marthand K. Venkatesh. He worked on Telugu films in the early 2000s as an assistant editor, before moving on to work as a free lancer for corporate films, documentaries, and television advertisements, before shifting to Pawan Kalyan Creative Works as an associate editor. After making his debut as an independent editor with Aakasa Ramanna (2010), his breakthrough came after working with Trivikram Srinivas in the action comedy Julayi (2012). Since then, Prawin has regularly collaborated with the filmmaker in Attarintiki Daredi (2013) and S/O Satyamurthy (2015). He has also worked closely with Vikram Kumar, working with him in the successful Manam (2014) and the Tamil film, 24 (2016).

He was also associated in the making of I Am That Change, a short film produced by Allu Arjun to mark the 68th Independence Day of India.

== Filmography ==
=== As editor ===
Year	Title	Notes
2010	Aakasa Ramanna	
2010	Gaayam 2	
2011	Katha Screenplay Darsakatvam Appalaraju	
2011	Pilla Zamindar	
2012	Ayyare	
2012	Disco	
2012	Julayi	
2012	Double Trouble	
2013	Gunde Jaari Gallanthayyinde	
2013	Sukumarudu	
2013	Attarintiki Daredi	
2013	Kaalicharan	
2014	Manam	
2014	Nuvvala Nenila	
2014	Oka Laila Kosam	
2014	Boochamma Boochodu	
2014	Vundiley Manchikalam Mundhu Mundhuna	
2014	Saheba Subramanyam	
2014	Chinnadana Nee Kosam	
2015	Nuvvu Nenu Okkatavudam	
2015	Bham Bolenath	
2015	S/O Satyamurthy	
2015	Vinavayya Ramayya	
2015	Tippu	
2015	Mirchi Lanti Kurradu	
2015	Courier Boy Kalyan	
2015	Size Zero	Shot in Telugu and Tamil
2015	Inji Iduppazhagi	Shot in Telugu and Tamil
2016	Soggade Chinni Nayana	
2016	24	Tamil film
2016	Siddhartha	
2016	Majnu	
2017	Nenu Local	
2017	Dwaraka	
2017	Chitrangada	
2017	Ninnu Kori	
2017	Shamantakamani	
2017	Middle Class Abbayi	
2017	Hello	
2018	Kumari 21F	Kannada film
2018	Pantham	
2018	Lover	
2018	Devadas	
2018	Parichayam	
2019	Majili	
2019	RDX Love	
2019	Hulchul	
2019	Venky Mama	
2020	Orey Bujjiga	
2020	Nishabdham	
2021	Power Play	
2021	Vakeel Saab	
2021	Dear Megha	
2021	Asmee	
2021	Tuck Jagadish	
2021	Itlu Amma	
2021	Oka Chinna Family Story	ZEE5 series
2022	Hero	
2022	Seethayanam	
2022	Katha Kanchiki Manam Intiki	
2022	10th Class Diaries	
2022	Commitment	
2022	Kotha Kothaga	
2022	Nenu Meeku Baaga Kavalsinavaadini	
2022	Leharaayi	
2022	Dhamaka	
2022	Top Gear	
2022	Lucky Lakshman	
2022	Maate Mantramu	
2023	Hunt	
2023	Suvarna Sundari	
2023	Organic Mama Hybrid Alludu	
2023	Shaakuntalam	
2023	Ramabanam	
2023	Manu Charitra	
2023	Mr. Pregnant	
2023	Kushi	
2023	Spark Life	
2023	Extra Ordinary Man	
2024	Siddharth Roy	
2024	Manamey	
2024	Bench Life	SonyLIV series
2025	Thammudu	
2025	Solo Boy	
2025	Paanch Minar	
2025	Drive	
2026	Euphoria	
2026	Irumudi	
