= Irumudi =

2026 Indian film by Shiva Nirvana

- Theatrical release poster
- Directed by: Shiva Nirvana
- Written by: Shiva Nirvana
- Produced by: Naveen Yerneni; Y. Ravi Shankar
- Starring: Ravi Teja; Priya Bhavani Shankar; Sai Kumar; Baby Nakshathra
- Cinematography: Vishnu Sarma
- Edited by: Prawin Pudi
- Music by: G. V. Prakash Kumar
- Production company: Mythri Movie Makers
- Release date: 21 August 2026
- Running time: 145 minutes
- Country: India
- Language: Telugu
- Budget: ₹35–40 crore
- Box office: ₹244.97–251.25 crore (Note: Irumudi's reported worldwide grosses vary between ₹244.97 crore (Hindustan Times) – ₹251.25 crore (Zoom TV))

Irumudi is a 2026 Telugu-language action thriller film written and directed by Shiva Nirvana. Produced by Mythri Movie Makers and presented by T-Series Films, the film stars Ravi Teja, Priya Bhavani Shankar, Sai Kumar, and Baby Nakshathra. The film centres on the relationship between a father and his daughter and incorporates the protagonist's participation in the Ayyappa Deeksha pilgrimage.

The film was released on 21 August 2026 and opened to positive reviews from critics and audiences. It was a commercial blockbuster success at the box office, grossing around ₹244.97–251.25 crore worldwide and is the career highest grosser for Ravi Teja and Shiva Nirvana.

== Plot ==
Trinadh Rama Kasu is a plantain farmer and merchant who lives in Polluru with his wife, Kaveri, and their school-going daughter, Manikanta "Maniamma". He shares a close relationship with Manikanta and encourages her to speak openly about anything happening in the village and school. He frequently confronts men who harass local women and girls, although his alcohol addiction and tendency to use violence occasionally creates tension with his family and his friend and mentor, "Guruswamy" Goparaju.

Goparaju has a school-going daughter, Gayathri, and observes a 41-day Ayyappa Deeksha every year. Unlike Trinadh, Goparaju discourages Gayathri from speaking openly about incidents of harassment, fearing that confronting the perpetrators would bring public embarrassment to her and the family. Meanwhile, several school-going girls from the village begin dying under mysterious circumstances. Their deaths are generally believed to be suicides resulting from family problems, romantic relationships, or academic pressure. Since the village does not have facilities for higher education, the girls travel outside the village to attend school. They have to walk to a pickup point to board the school bus and are frequently subjected to harassment and eve-teasing. Trinadh confronts several of the perpetrators. To address the problem, Goparaju approaches local MLA Bujji Raju, who arranges for the school bus to enter the village and pick up the students. Gayathri, Manikanta, and their friends subsequently travel to school together. Gayathri and some of her classmates are selected by their teacher Dhanalakshmi to attend special classes at her house because of their academic performance. Dhanalakshmi gradually begins behaving differently toward Gayathri and warns her to follow her instructions. Subsequently, Manikanta notices changes in Gayathri's behaviour and suspects that something is wrong.

Another student who had been attending Dhanalakshmi's special classes stops going and warns her friends not to attend. She later dies under mysterious circumstances. Manikanta learns that Gayathri may also be facing a serious problem and attempts to tell Trinadh, but is unable to do so. Around the same time, Manikanta asks Trinadh to give up alcohol. Trinadh agrees and begins his 41-day Ayyappa Deeksha. While he is observing the Deeksha, Manikanta continues trying to understand what has happened to Gayathri and the other girls. Gayathri subsequently goes missing after attending a special class. Trinadh and Goparaju search for her and discover a dead body, which turns out to be Manikanta's. Trinadh is devastated by his daughter's death, removes his Ayyappa mala, and abandons his Deeksha. He begins searching for those responsible for her death and interrogates several people who may have information. One of Trinadh's former enemies tells him that Gayathri had been seen alone on the night she went missing. Bujji Raju subsequently arrived, warned the men present and took Gayathri with him. Trinadh becomes suspicious because Bujji Raju had claimed that he was travelling to the city that night.

Trinadh then discovers an audio message sent by Manikanta before her death. The message indicates that she had discovered what was happening to Gayathri and the other girls. Trinadh confronts Goparaju and accuses him of being involved in Manikanta's death. He reveals that Dhanalakshmi had been sexually exploiting schoolgirls and supplying them to Bujji Raju, a pedophile. Girls who attempted to expose the exploitation were killed, with their deaths made to appear as suicides. On the night of Manikanta's death, she and another girl went to Dhanalakshmi's house while searching for Gayathri and witnessed Bujji Raju and Dhanalakshmi exploiting Gayathri. The duo subsequently pressured Goparaju to prevent Manikanta from revealing what she had witnessed. Goparaju tells Manikanta that exposing the incident would result in public humiliation and could affect Gayathri's future; Manikanta refuses to remain silent. Before Goparaju kills her, she manages to send an audio message to Trinadh containing information about what she has discovered. After learning the truth, Trinadh kills Goparaju for his involvement in Manikanta's death.

Trinadh then takes the surviving girls who were exploited to Dhanalakshmi's house and confronts her. He encourages the girls to overcome their fear and confront those responsible for their exploitation. Bujji Raju arrives with his men and attempts to stop Trinadh, threatening to have his associates attack Trinadh's village and family if he is assassinated. Trinadh refuses to back down and decapitates Bujji Raju in front of the girls. He then confronts Dhanalakshmi over her involvement in the exploitation of the students and the deaths of those who attempted to expose it. He kills Dhanalakshmi and her accomplice. After the confrontation, Trinadh performs the funeral rites for Manikanta. He keeps the promise he made to her and completely gives up alcohol, later resuming his Ayyappa Deeksha. During the penance, he sees a child reminding him of Manikanta, who asks him to bless her with the two pouches of the Ayyappa Deeksha, symbolizing his spiritual journey from Trinadh Rama Kasu to "Guruswamy" Trinadh Rama Kasu.

== Cast ==
- Ravi Teja as Trinadh Rama Kasu
- Priya Bhavani Shankar as Kaveri, Trinadh's wife
- Sai Kumar as "Guruswamy" Goparaju
- Baby Nakshathra as Manikanta "Manikanda" / "Manamma"
- Ajay Ghosh as Yerraji
- Jabardasth Komaram as Nagulu, Yerraji's son
- Ramesh Indira as MLA Bujji Raju
- Swasika as Dhanalakshmi, High School Teacher
- Laxman Meesala as Babu, Dhanalakshmi's assistant
- Surabhi Prabhavathi as Lakshmamma, Guruswamy's wife
- Sam as Gayathri, Guruswamy's daughter
- Praneetha Dev as Soujanya, Gayathri’s friend
- Sree Lasya as Anusha, Gayathri’s friend
- Yashika as Erraji’s daughter and Nagulu’s sister
- Rajkumar Kasireddy as Bajji Shop Vendor
- Lokesh Kumar Parimi as Suri, Trinadh’s friend
- Kishore Kumar Polimera as Trinadh’s friend

== Production ==
=== Development ===
After the release of Mass Jathara (2025), news reports said Ravi Teja planned to work with Shiva Nirvana for the former's 77th film, after completing his 76th film with Kishore Tirumala. Described as a crime thriller, the film was announced to be produced by Mythri Movie Makers. The project was tentatively called #RT77. On 26 January 2026, coinciding with Ravi Teja's birthday, the official title Irumudi was announced along with the first-look poster, showing the lead actor dressed in traditional Ayyappa mala attire. The title refers to the sacred offering bag carried by devotees during the pilgrimage to Lord Ayyappa. Nirvana wrote the story, screenplay, and dialogues for the film.

Before choosing Teja as the lead, Nirvana approached Naga Chaitanya, Gopichand, and Tamil actor Suriya.

=== Casting and filming ===
Priya Bhavani Shankar was cast as the female lead, playing Ravi Teja's wife, while child actress Baby Nakshathra was selected to play his daughter, a central figure around whom the plot revolves. Principal photography started in early 2026 in Hyderabad. By June 2026, the makers said that fifty percent of the filming had been completed.

== Music ==
The film score and soundtrack are composed by G. V. Prakash Kumar, his first collaboration with director Shiva Nirvana and second with Ravi Teja. The first single, a devotional song titled "Irumudi Kattu", was released on 29 June 2026.

== Release ==
=== Theatrical ===
The film was released theatrically on 21 August 2026 in Telugu, alongside a Tamil dubbed version titled Irumudi Kattu.

=== Home Media ===
The post-theatrical digital streaming rights were acquired by Netflix. The film began streaming on Netflix from 18 September 2026 in Telugu, Tamil, Malayalam, Kannada and Hindi languages.

== Reception ==
A critic from Sakshi Post rated the film 3.5/5 and wrote, "Irumudi is a sincere, emotional and socially relevant film that works largely because of its performances and strong core story. Raviteja delivers one of his most mature performances in recent years [...] Despite a few predictable portions in the second half, Irumudi remains an engaging watch with plenty of emotional highs." Suresh Kavirayani of Cinema Express rated the film 3.5/5 stars and wrote, "Despite a few logical loopholes and some predictable portions in the second half, Irumudi is a gripping family drama that blends a socially relevant subject, Ayyappa Deeksha and family emotions effectively. Ravi Teja’s excellent performance, Shiva Nirvana’s focused narration and dialogues, along with the cinematography, music and supporting performances, make it a worthwhile watch."

Sashidhar Adivi of Filmfare rated the film 3/5 stars and wrote, "Irumudi is a solid, intense drama elevated by Ravi Teja’s restrained performance and a convincing father-daughter bond. But predictable villains and uneven emotional beats prevent it from becoming as powerful or shattering as it could have been." BVS Prakash of Deccan Chronicle wrote, "Shiva Nirvana redeems himself with this emotionally charged dark drama after films such as Kushi. He demonstrates that he can handle a darker, Tamil-style dramatic narrative while avoiding the usual clichés of forced comedy and unnecessary songs. Despite its shortcomings, Irumudi works in parts, primarily because of Ravi Teja's powerful performance, the emotional father-daughter relationship, and a gripping climax."
