= Ninnu Kori =

2017 Indian film directed by Shiva Nirvana

- Theatrical release poster
- Directed by: Shiva Nirvana
- Screenplay by: Kona Venkat
- Story by: Shiva Nirvana
- Produced by: D. V. V. Danayya
- Starring: Nani; Nivetha Thomas; Aadhi Pinisetty
- Cinematography: Karthik Gattamneni
- Edited by: Prawin Pudi
- Music by: Gopi Sunder
- Production companies: DVV Entertainments; Kona Film Corporation
- Release date: 7 July 2017
- Running time: 137 minutes
- Country: India
- Language: Telugu
- Budget: ₹18 crore
- Box office: est. ₹52.3 crore

Ninnu Kori (transl. Wanting you) is a 2017 Indian Telugu-language romantic comedy drama film directed by Shiva Nirvana (in his directoral debut) from a screenplay written by Kona Venkat. Produced by DVV Danayya under DVV Entertainments, the film stars Nani, Nivetha Thomas and Aadhi Pinisetty while Murali Sharma and Tanikella Bharani play supporting roles. Gopi Sunder composed the music. Prawin Pudi and Karthik Ghattamaneni are the editor and cinematographer of the film respectively.

The plot revolves around Uma (Nani), Pallavi (Thomas), and Arun (Pinisetty). When Uma declines her proposal to elope, Pallavi marries Arun and emigrates to the US. Uma who still is in love with Pallavi also lands up in the US a year later in the hope of getting her back.

The film was commercially successful, grossing over ₹52 crore at the box office. A Tamil-language remake titled Thalli Pogathey was released in 2021.

== Plot ==
On the day of her first wedding anniversary, Pallavi travels from San Francisco to Los Angeles to meet her former lover, P. Uma Maheswara Rao, unbeknownst to her husband, Arun.

Eighteen months earlier, college-going Pallavi aspires to record a dance performance to show her future family post-marriage. Lacking natural skill, she hires Uma, an orphaned statistics student, to tutor her. Over time, Uma helps Pallavi with her dance, assists her in confronting a bully, and the two fall in love. Pallavi arranges for Uma to stay in her family's penthouse, where he tutors local students to earn money. When her family begins seeking marital alliances, Pallavi proposes eloping. Uma initially agrees, but backs out after witnessing Pallavi's father, Chandramouli, lecture a young boy on the financial and emotional responsibilities of marriage. Realizing he needs stability, Uma leaves for New Delhi to pursue a Ph.D., asking Pallavi to wait. Heartbroken and pressured to marry, Pallavi severs contact and eventually agrees to marry her suitor Arun. A year later, Pallavi learns from Uma's former professor that Uma has fallen into severe depression and alcoholism. Feeling responsible, she travels to Los Angeles to confront him.

In Los Angeles, Pallavi insists she is happily married, but Uma refuses to believe her. To prove her happiness, Pallavi invites Uma to stay with her and Arun in San Francisco for 10 days with Arun's consent. Uma accepts on the condition that if he fails to see genuine love between the couple, Pallavi must leave him. Despite his cynical behaviour, he gradually wins over Arun's colleagues. Complications arise when Chandramouli and his brother-in-law, Lovababu, arrive unexpectedly in San Francisco. Though Uma promises to keep the story hidden and lies that he is Arun's childhood friend, Chandramouli, who has been aware of Pallavi's past involvement with someone, secretly tries to find if she is happy with Arun.

During a business trip to Santa Monica, Pallavi witnesses Arun hugging another woman, leading her to suspect him of infidelity. Meanwhile, Chandramouli learns through a phone conversation with Arun's father that Arun had no childhood friend called Uma, eventually confirming Uma and Pallavi's past relationship through Pallavi's friend Kavitha. When Pallavi confronts Arun about the woman, his evasive answers increases his suspicion, prompting her to confide in Uma. Believing Pallavi will now leave Arun, Uma is approached by a remorseful Chandramouli, who offers to marry Pallavi to him.

Before acting, Uma confronts Arun and discovers that the woman is Christie, a friend from Arun's MBA days in the United States. Christie had developed unrequited feelings for Arun. After he rejected her proposal, she attempted suicide and descended into drug addiction. Guilt-ridden, Arun had been secretly visiting her to support her rehabilitation. Arun reveals to Uma that he agreed to let Uma stay in their house precisely to prevent him from suffering a similar self-destructive path.

Realizing Arun's integrity and selflessness, Uma decides to step aside. He intentionally acts rudely to alienate Pallavi, forcing her to realize the depth of Arun's character. As Arun prepares to leave to give Pallavi time, she stops him, clearing their misunderstandings, and reaffirming her love for him. Devastated but at peace with his decision, Uma departs.

A year later, Uma returns to Vizag and meets Pallavi and Arun, who now have a baby daughter. Uma reveals he has traveled to meet a woman he connected with online, ready to move forward with his life.

== Cast ==
- Nani as Dr. P. Uma Maheswara Rao "Uma"
- Nivetha Thomas as Pallavi
- Aadhi Pinisetty as Arun
- Murali Sharma as Chandramouli, Pallavi's father
- Tanikella Bharani as Murthy, Uma's mentor
- Prudhviraj as Lovababu, Pallavi's brother-in-law
- Rajasree Nair as Pallavi's mother
- Mounica as Pallavi's elder sister
- Vidyullekha Raman as Dr. Kavitha, Pallavi's friend
- Sudharshan
- Seshadri Sridhara as Debaseesh, Dr. Kavitha's Husband
- Kedar Shankar as Arun's father
- Sivakumar Ramachandravarapu
- Vineet Chandra
- Anirudh Kasturi as Suresh, Arun's friend

== Music ==
Ninnu Kori

Soundtrack album by Gopi Sunder
- Released: 27 June 2017
- Recorded: 2017
- Genre: Film soundtrack
- Length: 16:17
- Language: Telugu
- Label: Saregama
- Producer: Gopi Sunder

Gopi Sunder chronology
Role Models (2017)	Ninnu Kori (2017)	Tiyaan (2017)

Music of the film was composed by Gopi Sunder. This is his third collaboration with Nani.

No.	Title	Lyrics	Singer(s)	Length
1.	"Adiga Adiga"	Srijo	Sid Sriram	3:48
2.	"Unnattundi Gundey"	Ramajogayya Sastry	Karthik, Chinmayi	5:07
3.	"Once Upon A Time Lo"	Bhaskarabatla	Arun Gopan	3:54
4.	"Hey Badhulu Cheppavey"	Ananta Sriram	Haricharan	3:28
5.	"Ninnu Kori"	Shiva Nirvana	Arun Gopan	2:20

== Release ==
Ninnu Kori was released on 7 July 2017. Later, a Hyderabad-Mumbai based production company, Aditya Movies bought the Hindi dubbing rights of the film. It is dubbed into Hindi as Aaj Ka Khiladi in 2020 which is to have a direct premiere on TV channel. Sony Networks bought the satellite rights of the Hindi dubbed version.

== Reception ==
Sowmya Shruthi of The Times of India rated three out of five and wrote "Ninnu Kori is an entertainer with lots of drama and emotion with just the right amount of laughter thrown in," while adding that "Nani, Aadhi and Nivetha breathe life in their characters and you can't think of anybody else playing those roles with such ease and conviction."

Firstpost's Hemanth Kumar gave 3.5/5 and praised the film for its well written characters. "Ninnu Kori is a character-driven film and Shiva Nirvana invests plenty of time in developing each of the characters who have to deal with their share of pain and turbulence in their lives", Kumar stated. He also added that "[the film] drives home the notion that love is transient and that in pursuit of happiness, you learn to move on from your past."

Sangeetha Devi Dundoo writing for The Hindu opined that "The film is a contemporary take on relationships." Priyanka Sundar of The Indian Express rated two stars out of five, by writing "Shiva Nirvana has presented a love story which initially looked refreshing, but as minutes pass by, the film is too much of stretch with a few laughs thrown in."

== Awards and nominations ==
Year	Award	Category	Nominee	Result	Ref
17 December 2017	Zee Cine Awards Telugu	Entertainer Of The Year – Male	Nani	Won	
17 December 2017	Zee Cine Awards Telugu	Entertainer Of The Year – Female	Nivetha Thomas	Nominated	
17 December 2017	Zee Cine Awards Telugu	Favorite Music Director	Gopi Sundar	Nominated	
17 December 2017	Zee Cine Awards Telugu	Favorite Song	"Adiga Adiga"	Nominated	
16 June 2018	65th Filmfare Awards South	Best Actress – Telugu	Nivetha Thomas	Nominated	
16 June 2018	65th Filmfare Awards South	Best Supporting Actor – Telugu	Aadhi Pinisetty	Nominated	
16 June 2018	65th Filmfare Awards South	Best Male Playback Singer – Telugu	Sid Sriram	Nominated	
14 & 15 September 2018	7th South Indian International Movie Awards	Best Supporting Actor (Telugu)	Aadhi Pinisetty	Won	
14 & 15 September 2018	7th South Indian International Movie Awards	Best Music Director (Telugu)	Gopi Sundar	Nominated	
14 & 15 September 2018	7th South Indian International Movie Awards	Best Male Playback Singer (Telugu)	Sid Sriram	Nominated	

== Remakes ==
Ninnu Kori was remade in Tamil as Thalli Pogathey in 2021 by R. Kannan starring Atharvaa, Anupama Parameswaran and Amitash Pradhan.
