= Shiva Nirvana =

Indian director

- Born: Shiva Shankar Lalam; Sabbavaram, Andhra Pradesh, India
- Occupations: Film director, screenwriter
- Years active: 2017–present

Shiva Nirvana is an Indian film director and screenwriter who works in Telugu cinema.

== Early life and career ==
Nirvana hails from Sabbavaram of Visakhapatnam district, Andhra Pradesh. His birth name is Siva Sankar Lalam, but he adopted 'Nirvana' as his last name as he felt "very connected to it" when he came across it for the first time. He graduated with M.Sc., B.Ed., and worked as a Biology teacher for two years. Nirvana subsequently moved to Hyderabad and worked as an assistant director to Ram Gopal Varma and Parasuram in Rakta Charitra (2010) and Solo (2011), respectively.

== Filmography ==
Year	Film	Notes
2017	Ninnu Kori	Also lyricist
2019	Majili	Also lyricist
2021	Tuck Jagadish	Also lyricist and playback singer
2023	Kushi	Also lyricist
2026	Irumudi	Also lyricist

== Discography ==
As a lyricist

Year	Song	Film	Composer	Notes
2017	"Ninnu Kori Title Song"	Ninnu Kori	Gopi Sundar	
2019	"Yedetthu Mallele"	Majili	Gopi Sundar	
2021	"Tuck Song"	Tuck Jagadish	S. Thaman	Also singer
2023	"Kushi Title Song"	Kushi	Hesham Abdul Wahab	
2023	"Yedhaki Oka Gaayam"	Kushi	Hesham Abdul Wahab	
2023	"Na Roja Nuvve"	Kushi	Hesham Abdul Wahab	
2023	"Aradhya"	Kushi	Hesham Abdul Wahab	
2023	"Osi Pellama"	Kushi	Hesham Abdul Wahab	
2026	"Karthika Maasam"	Irumudi	G. V. Prakash Kumar	
2026	"Irumudi Kattu"	Irumudi	G. V. Prakash Kumar	

== Awards and nominations ==
Year	Ceremony	Category	Film	Result	Ref.
2019	20th Santosham Film Awards	Best Story Writer	Majili	Won	
2020	9th SIIMA Awards	Best Director – Telugu	Majili	Nominated	
