= 69th Filmfare Awards South =

2024 film awards event in Telangana, India

- Awarded for: Best of films of 2023
- Presented by: Filmfare
- Announced on: 16 July 2024 (nominations)
- Presented on: 3 August 2024
- Site: JRC Conventions & Trade Fairs, Hyderabad, Telangana, India
- Hosted by: Faria Abdullah; Sundeep Kishan; Vindhya Vishaka
- Organized by: The Times Group
- Magazine issue: Filmfare
- Official website: Official website

Highlights
- Best Film: Balagam (Telugu); Chithha (Tamil); 2018 (Malayalam); Daredevil Musthafa (Kannada)
- Lifetime achievement: Srinath
- Most awards: Chithha (7)
- Most nominations: Ponniyin Selvan: II (11)

Television coverage
- Channel: Star Maa Movies (Telugu); Vijay Super (Tamil); Asianet Movies (Malayalam); Star Suvarna Plus (Kannada)
- Network: Disney Star

The 69th Filmfare Awards South is an awards event that recognised and honoured the best films and performances from the Telugu, Tamil, Malayalam and Kannada films and music released in 2023 along with special honours for lifetime contributions and few special awards. The nominations were announced on 16 July 2024 and took place on 3 August 2024.

Chithha is the most awarded film with seven awards, followed by Dasara with six, Baby and Ponniyin Selvan: II with five, Sapta Saagaradaache Ello (Note: Includes both Sapta Saagaradaache Ello – Side A and Sapta Saagaradaache Ello – Side B) with four, and Balagam, Daredevil Musthafa and Kaathal – The Core with three each. Dasara is the most awarded Telugu film. Chithha is the most awarded Tamil film. Kaathal – The Core is the most awarded Malayalam film. Sapta Saagaradaache Ello is the most awarded Kannada film.

Every Best Film winner have also won the Best Director award, expect for Kannada cinema. Kapil Kapilan is the most awarded individual having won Best Male Playback Singer – Malayalam and Best Male Playback Singer – Kannada, making him the only individual to win an award in two different languages (Malayalam and Kannada). Dasara is the only film to have two lead acting role awards won by Nani (Best Actor – Telugu) and Keerthy Suresh (Best Actress – Telugu).

== Winners and nominees ==
Winners are listed first, highlighted in boldface.

=== Main awards ===
==== Kannada cinema ====
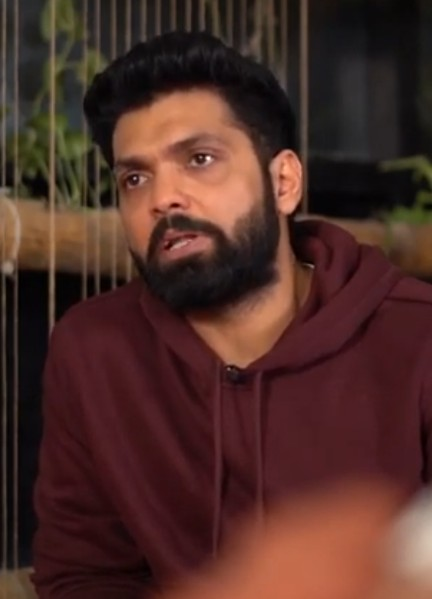
Rakshit Shetty, Best Actor (Kannada) winner

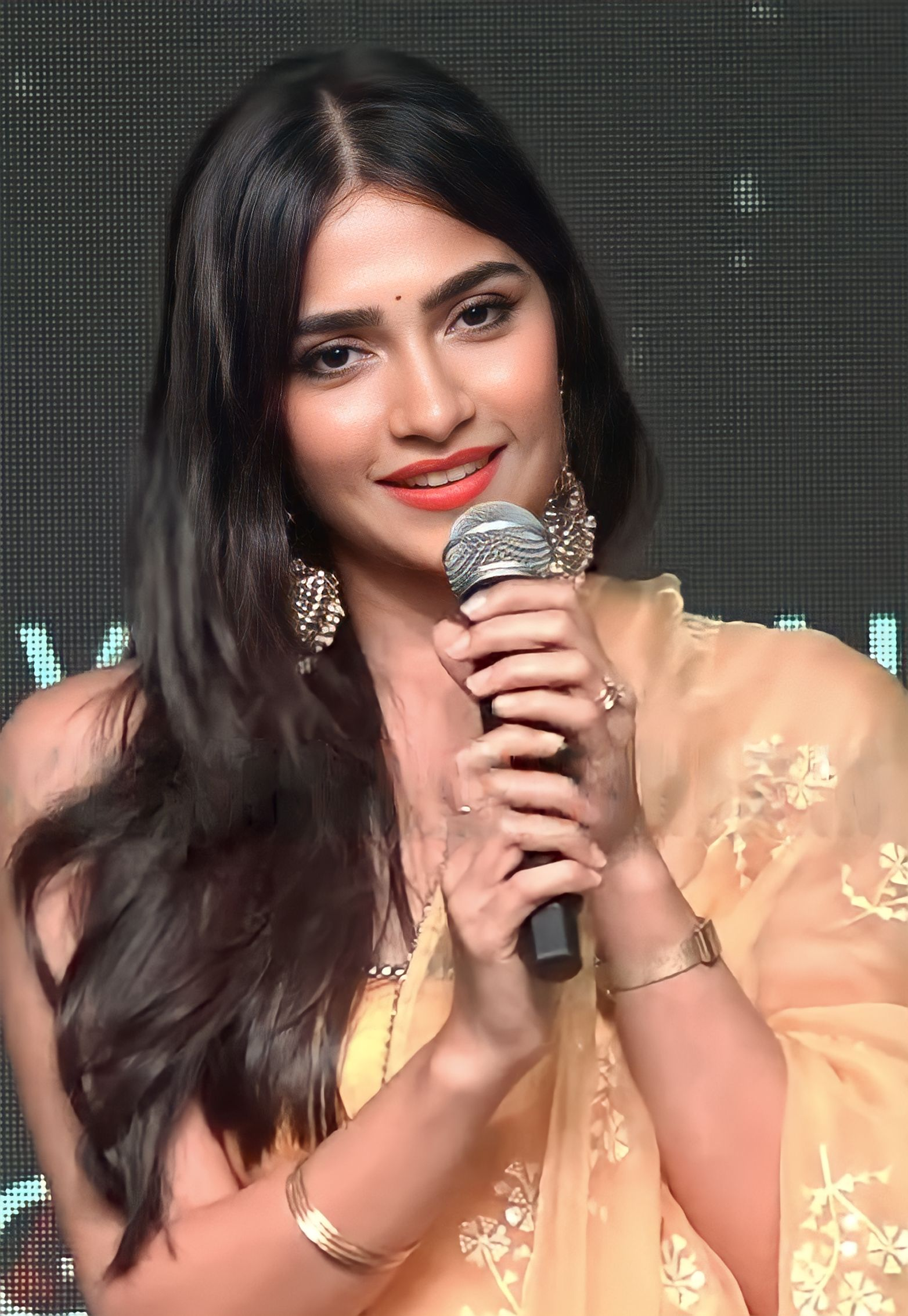
Rukmini Vasanth, Critics Best Actress (Kannada) winner

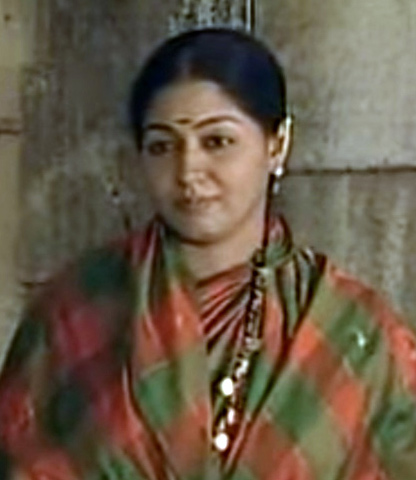
Sudha Belawadi, Best Supporting Actress (Kannada) winner

Charan Raj, Best Music Director (Kannada) winner

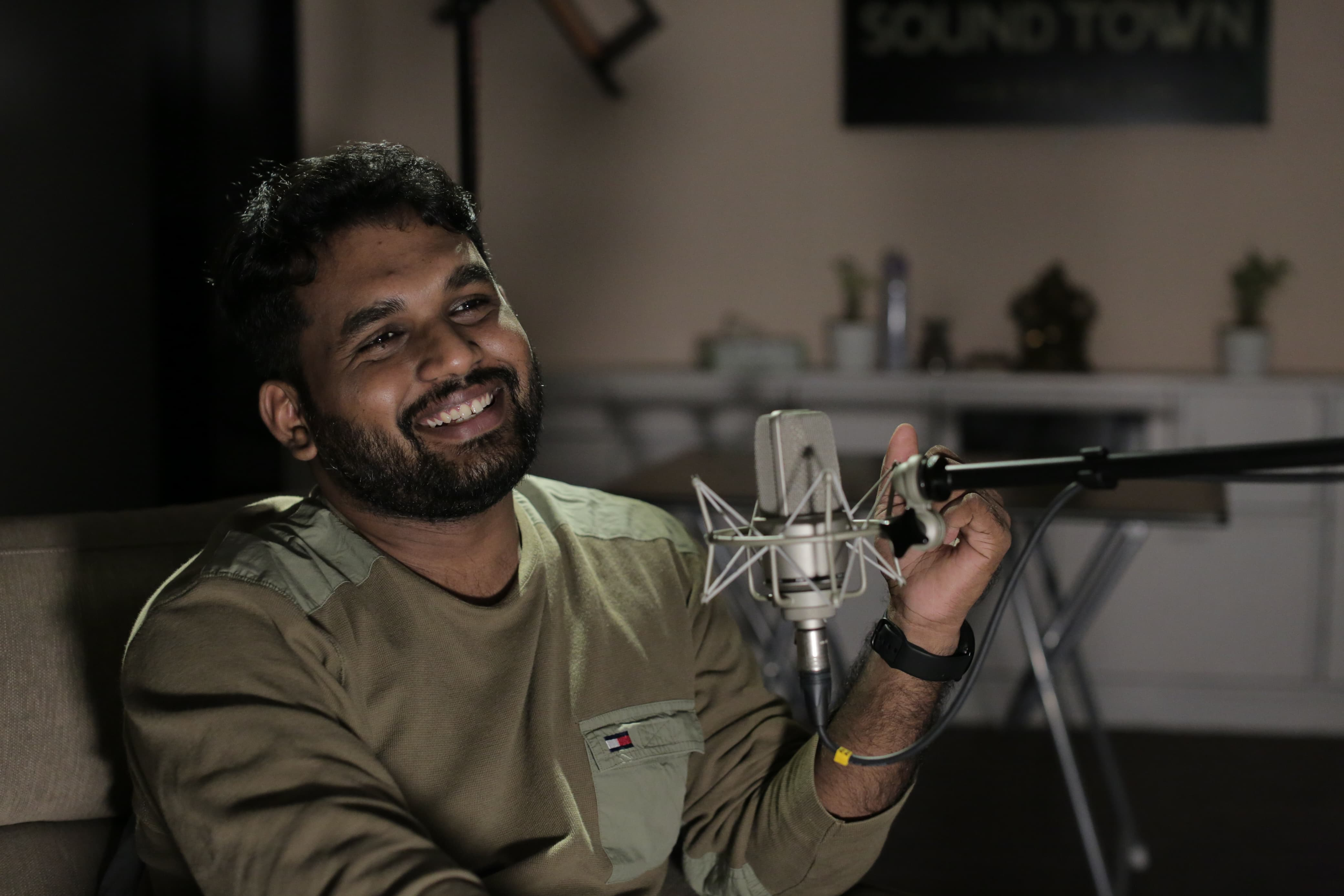
Kapil Kapilan, Best Male Playback Singer Kannada & Malayalam winner

Best Film	Best Director
**Daredevil Musthafa**; 19.20.21 – Devaraj R, producer; Kaatera – Rockline Venkatesh, producer; Kousalya Supraja Rama – B. C. Patil and Shashank, producers; Sapta Saagaradaache Ello – Rakshit Shetty, producer; Swathi Mutthina Male Haniye – Ramya, Ravi Rai Kalasa and Vachan Shetty, producers	**Hemanth M. Rao – Sapta Saagaradaache Ello**; Mansore – 19.20.21; Nithin Krishnamurthy – Hostel Hudugaru Bekagiddare; Raj B. Shetty – Swathi Mutthina Male Haniye; Shashank Soghal – Daredevil Musthafa; Tharun Sudhir – Kaatera
Best Actor	Best Actress
**Rakshit Shetty – Sapta Saagaradaache Ello as Manu**; Darshan – Kaatera as Kaatera; Nagabhushana – Tagaru Palya as Chikka; Raj B. Shetty – Swathi Mutthina Male Haniye as Aniketh; Shishir Baikady – Daredevil Musthafa as Jamal Abdul Musthafa Hussain; Shiva Rajkumar – Ghost as Dalavayi Muddanna / Anand Rao	**Siri Ravikumar – Swathi Mutthina Male Haniye as Prerana**; Akshatha Pandavapura – Pinki Elli; Amrutha Prem – Tagaru Palya as Jyothi; Milana Nagaraj – Kousalya Supraja Rama as Muthulakshmi; Rukmini Vasanth – Sapta Saagaradaache Ello as Priya; Sindhu Sreenivasa Murthy – Aachar & Co as Suma
Best Supporting Actor	Best Supporting Actress
**Rangayana Raghu – Tagaru Palya as Chikka**; Nagabhushana – Kousalya Supraja Rama as Santhu; Poornachandra Mysore – Daredevil Musthafa as Sulthankeri Usman; Rajesh Nataranga – 19.20.21 as Rafi; Ramesh Indira – Sapta Saagaradaache Ello as Soma	**Sudha Belawadi – Kousalya Supraja Rama as Kousalya**; Gunjalamma – Pinki Elli; M. D. Pallavi – 19.20.21; Shruti – Kaatera as Kumari; Tara – Tagaru Palya as Shantha
Best Music Director	Best Lyricist
**Charan Raj – Sapta Saagaradaache Ello**; Arjun Janya – Kousalya Supraja Rama; Midhun Mukundan – Swathi Mutthina Male Haniye; Vasuki Vaibhav – Tagaru Palya; V. Harikrishna – Kaatera	**B. R. Lakshman Rao – "Yava Chumbaka" from Chowka Bara**; Dhananjaya – "Sambanja Annodu Doddu Kana" from Tagaru Palya; Dhananjay Ranjan – "Sapta Saagaradaache Ello Title Track" from Sapta Saagaradaache Ello – Side A; Jayanth Kaikini – "Preethisuve" from Kousalya Supraja Rama; Prithvi – "Mellage" from Swathi Mutthina Male Haniye
Best Playback Singer – Male	Best Playback Singer – Female
**Kapil Kapilan – "Sapta Saagaradaache Ello Title Track" from Sapta Saagaradaache Ello – Side A**; Ravindra Soragavi– "Nodalaagade Deva" from Viratapura Viraagi; Sonu Nigam – "Bombe Bombe" from Kranti; Vasuki Vaibhav – "Tagaru Palya Title Track" from Tagaru Palya; Vijay Prakash – "Punyathma" from Kaatera	**Srilakshmi Belmannu – "Kadalanu" from Sapta Saagaradaache Ello – Side A**; Madhuri Seshadri – "Mellage" from Swathi Mutthina Male Haniye; Mangli – "Pasandaagavne" from Kaatera; Prithwi Bhat – "Kousalya Supraja Rama" from Kousalya Supraja Rama; Sangeetha Katti – "Kaayo Shiva Kapado Shiva" from Pentagon
Critics Best Actor	Critics Best Actress
**Poornachandra Mysore – Orchestra Mysuru as Poorna**	**Rukmini Vasanth – Sapta Saagaradaache Ello as Priya**

==== Malayalam cinema ====
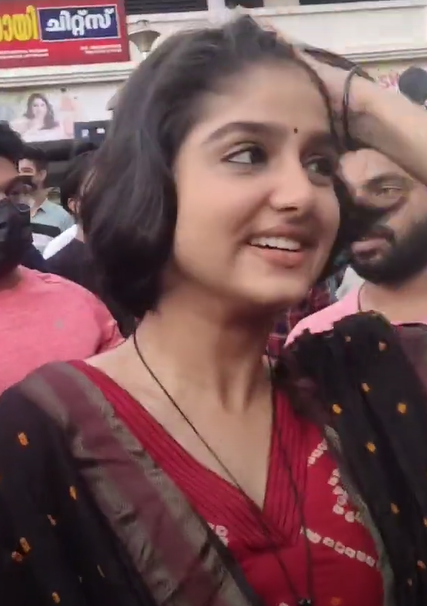
Anaswara Rajan, Best Supporting Actress (Malayalam) winner

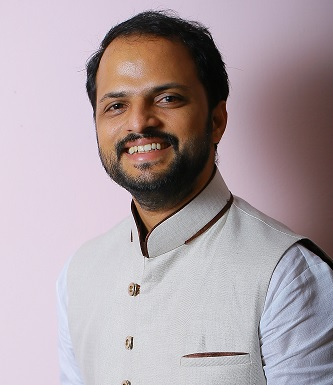
Jude Anthany Joseph, Best Director (Malayalam) winner

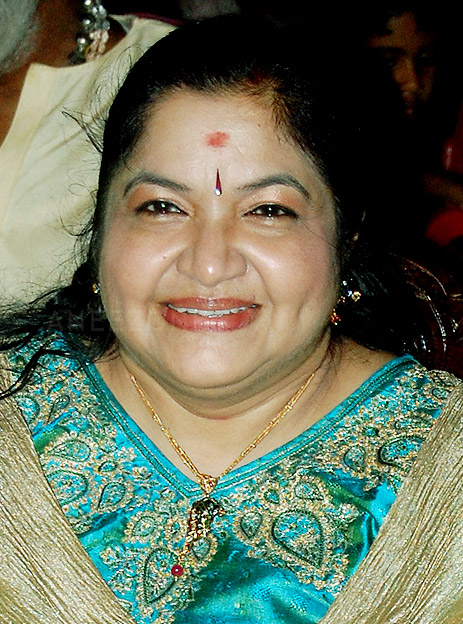
K. S. Chithra, Best Female Playback Singer (Malayalam) winner

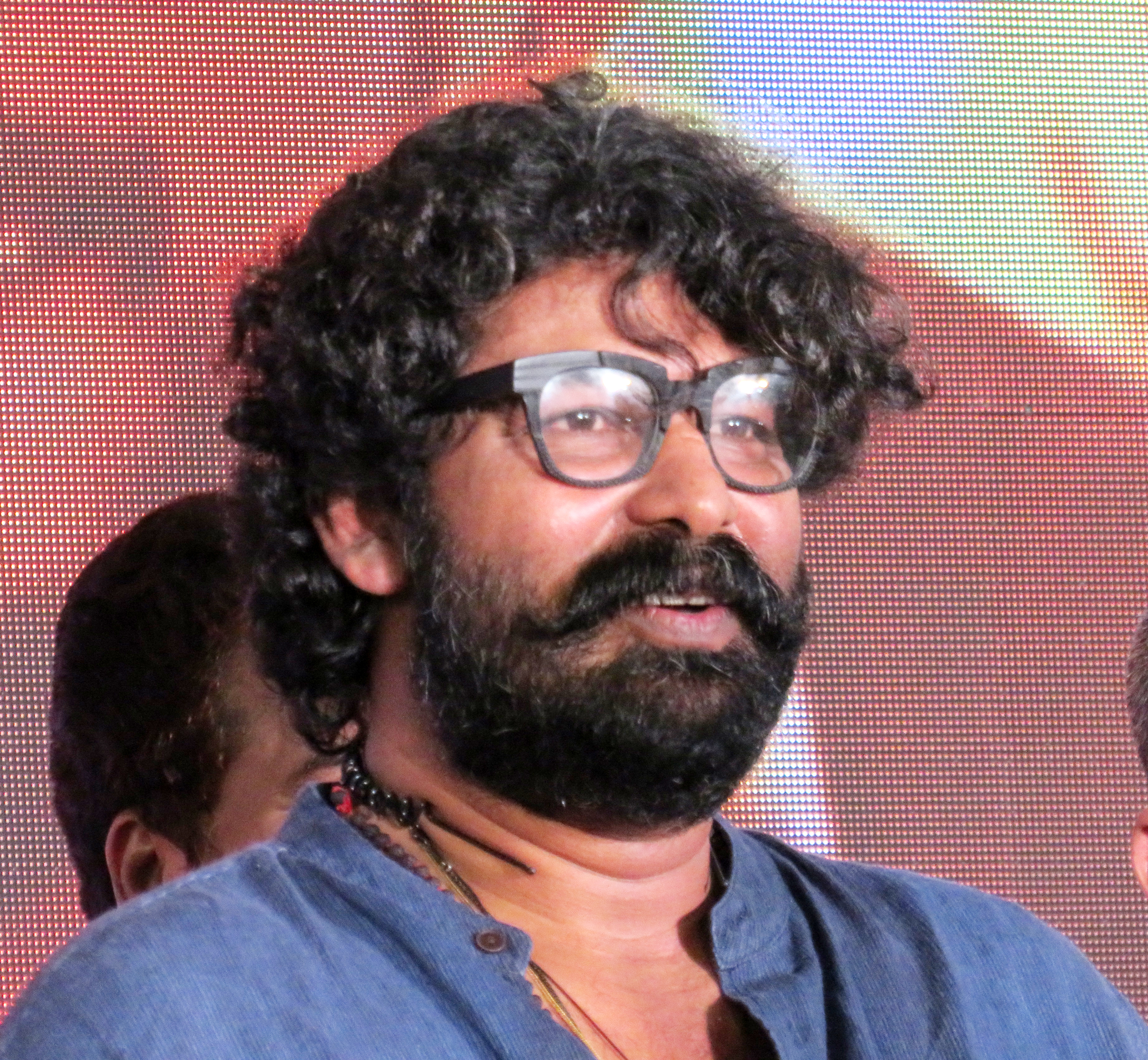
Joju George, Critics Best Actor (Malayalam) winner

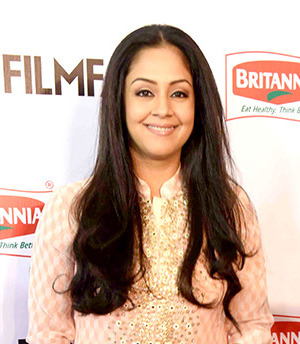
Jyothika, Critics Best Actress (Malayalam) winner

Best Film	Best Director
**2018 – Anto Joseph, C.K. Padmakumar and Venu Kunnappilly, producers**; Iratta – Joju George, Martin Prakkat and Sijo Vadakkan, producers; Kaathal – The Core – Mammootty, producer; Nanpakal Nerathu Mayakkam – Mammootty, producer; Neru – Antony Perumbavoor, producer; Pachuvum Athbutha Vilakkum –Sethu Mannarkkad, producer; Romancham – Girish Gangadharan, Joby George and Johnpaul George, producers	**Jude Anthany Joseph – 2018**; Jeethu Joseph – Neru; Jeo Baby – Kaathal – The Core; Jithu Madhavan – Romancham; Krishand RK – Purusha Pretham; Lijo Jose Pellissery – Nanpakal Nerathu Mayakkam; Rohit M. G. Krishnan – Iratta
Best Actor	Best Actress
**Mammootty – Nanpakal Nerathu Mayakkam as James / Sundaram**; Alexander Prasanth – Purusha Pretham as Sebastian; Biju Menon – Thankam as Mathews; Joju George – Iratta as Pramod Kumar and Vinod Kumar; Mammootty – Kaathal – The Core as Mathew Devassy; Nivin Pauly – Thuramukham as Mattancherry Moidu; Tovino Thomas – 2018 as Anoop	**Vincy Aloshious – Rekha as Rekha Rajendran**; Anjana Jayaprakash – Pachuvum Athbutha Vilakkum as Hamsadhwani; Jyothika – Kaathal – The Core as Omana Philip Mathew; Kalyani Priyadarshan – Sesham Mike-il Fathima as Fathima Noorjahan; Lena – Article 21 as Tamara; Manju Warrier – Ayisha as Nilambur Ayisha; Navya Nair – Janaki Jaane as Janaki
Best Supporting Actor	Best Supporting Actress
**Jagadish – Purusha Pretham as Dileep**; Arjun Ashokan – Romancham as Sinu Solomon; Biju Menon – Garudan as Nishanth Kumar; Jagadish – Falimy as Chandran; Siddique – Corona Papers as Shankararaman / Govindan Nambiar; Vineeth Sreenivasan – Thankam as Kannan; Vishnu Agasthya – RDX: Robert Dony Xavier as Paulson	**Poornima Indrajith – Thuramukham**; **Anaswara Rajan – Neru** as Sara Mohammed; Anaswara Rajan – Pranaya Vilasam as Anusree; Aswathy B – B 32 Muthal 44 Vare as Jaya; Darshana Rajendran – Purusha Pretham as Susan; Manju Pillai – Falimy as Rema Chandran
Best Music Director	Best Lyricist
**Sam C. S. – RDX: Robert Dony Xavier**; 4 Musics – Jawanum Mullapoovum; Deepankuran Kaithapram – Mehfil; Hesham Abdul Wahab – Madhura Manohara Moham; Justin Prabhakaran – Pachuvum Athbutha Vilakkum; M. Jayachandran – Ayisha; P S Jayhari – Santhosham	**Anwar Ali – "Ennum En Kaaval" from Kaathal – The Core**; B. K. Harinarayanan – "Ayisha Ayisha" from Ayisha; B. K. Harinarayanan – "Muttathe Mulla" from Jawanum Mullapoovum; Manu Manjith – "Nin Koode Njan Illayo" from Pachuvum Athbutha Vilakkum; Muhsin Parari – "Puthuthayorith" from Iratta; Vinayak Sasikumar – "Januvariyile Then Mazha" from Santhosham
Best Playback Singer – Male	Best Playback Singer – Female
**Kapil Kapilan – "Neela Nilave" from RDX: Robert Dony Xavier**; Arvind Venugopal – "Oru Nokkil" from Madhura Manohara Moham; K. S. Harisankar – "Januvariyile Then Mazha" from Santhosham; Madhu Balakrishnan – "Kanchana Kannezhuthi" from Njanum Pinnoru Njanum; Shahabaz Aman – "Puthuthayorith" from Iratta; Sooraj Santhosh – "Maayunnuvo Pakale" from Janaki Jaane; Vijay Yesudas – "Onnu Thotte" from Jawanum Mullapoovum	**K. S. Chithra** **– "Muttathe Mulla" from Jawanum Mullapoovum**; K. S. Chithra – "Ee Mazhamukilo" from Jaladhara Pumpset Since 1962; Karthika Vaidyanathan – "Neeyum Njaanum" from Pazhanjan Pranayam; Madhuvanthi Narayan – "Chembarathi Poo" from Janaki Jaane; Nakshathra Santhosh – "Vidaathe Vichaaram" from Phoenix; Nithya Mammen – "Mizhiyo Niraye" from Dear Vaappi; Shreya Ghoshal – "Ayisha Ayisha" from Ayisha
Critics Best Actor	Critics Best Actress
**Joju George – Iratta as Pramod Kumar and Vinod Kumar**	**Jyothika** **– Kaathal – The Core as Omana Philip Mathew**

==== Tamil cinema ====
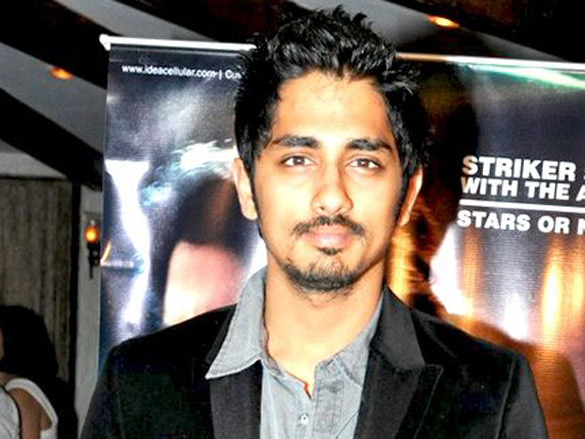
Siddharth, Best Film & Critics Best Actor (Tamil) winner

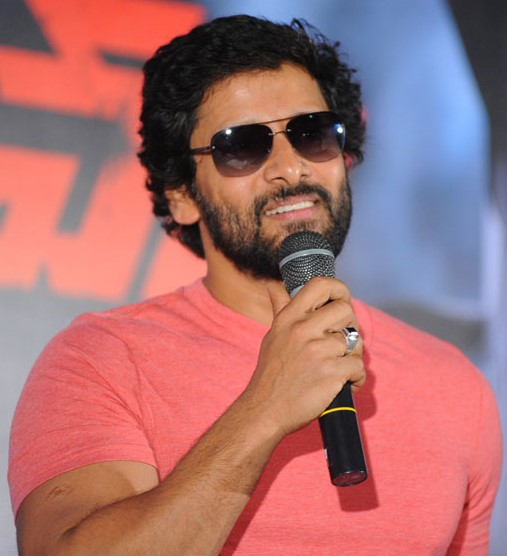
Vikram, Best Actor (Tamil) winner

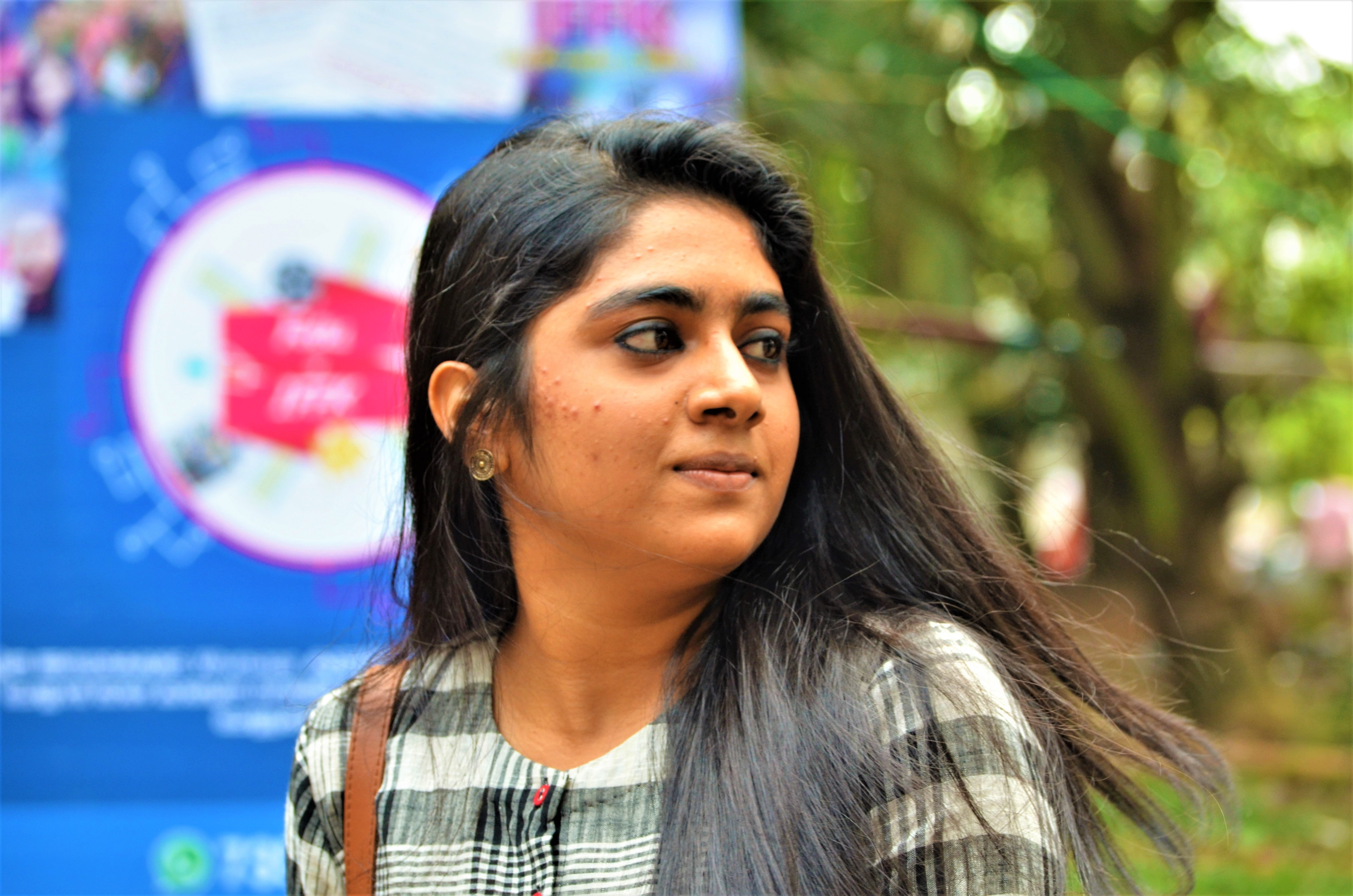
Nimisha Sajayan, Best Actress (Tamil), winner

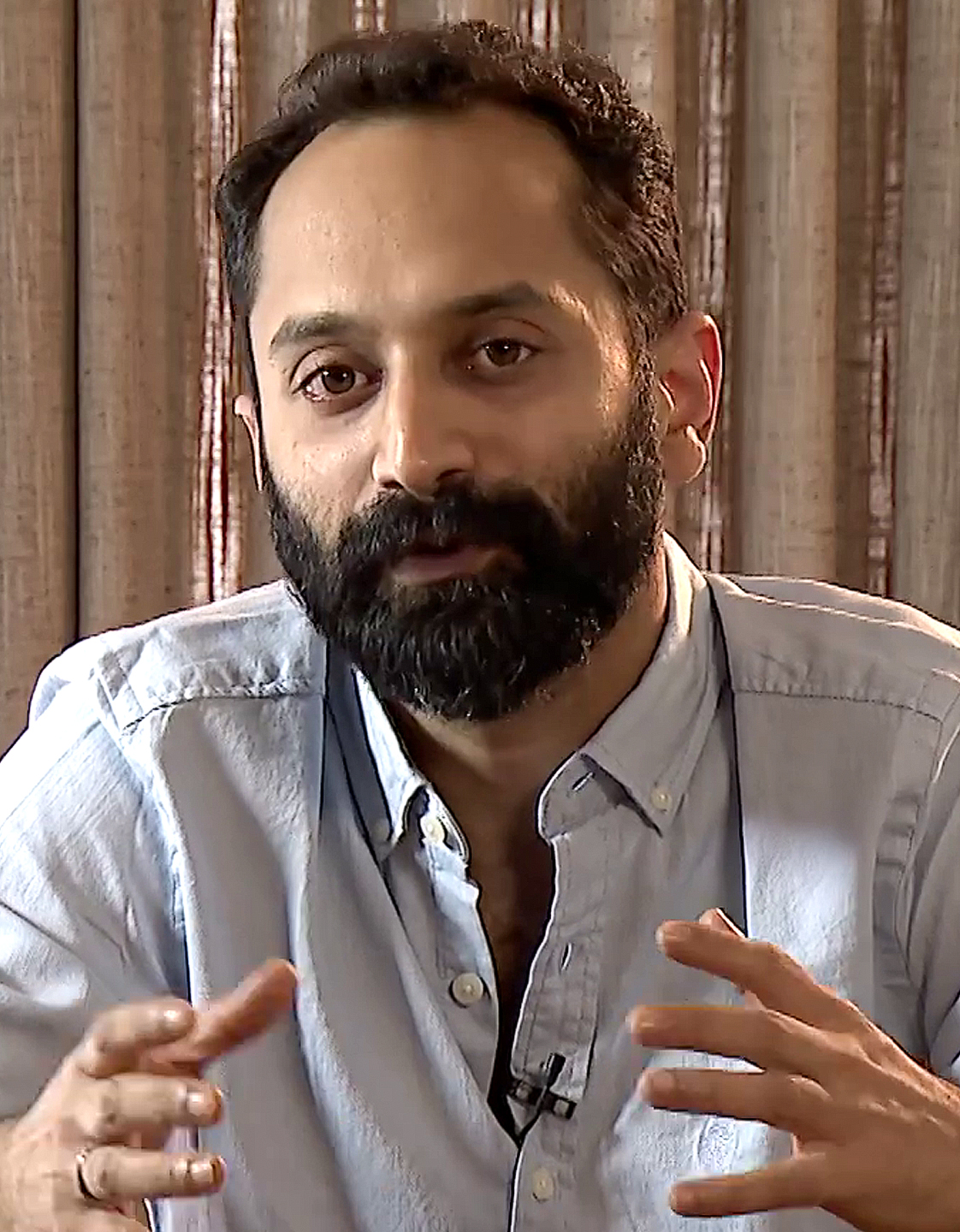
Fahadh Faasil, Best Supporting Actor (Tamil), winner

Best Film	Best Director
**Chithha – Siddharth, producer**; Ayothi – R. Ravindran, producer; Maamannan – Udhayanidhi Stalin, producer; Ponniyin Selvan: II – Mani Ratnam and Subaskaran Allirajah, producers; Viduthalai Part 1 – Elred Kumar, producer	**S. U. Arun Kumar – Chithha**; Madonne Ashwin – Maaveeran; Mani Ratnam – Ponniyin Selvan: II; Mari Selvaraj – Maamannan; Vetrimaaran – Viduthalai Part 1
Best Actor	Best Actress
**Vikram – Ponniyin Selvan: II as Aditha Karikalan**; Siddharth – Chithha as Eeswaran; Sivakarthikeyan – Maaveeran as Sathya / Maaveeran; Soori – Viduthalai Part 1 as Kumaresan; Vadivelu – Maamannan as Sa. Maamannan	**Nimisha Sajayan – Chithha as Shakthi**; Aishwarya Rai Bachchan – Ponniyin Selvan: II as Nandini; Aishwarya Rajesh – Farhana as Farhana / Isha; Aparna Das – Dada as Sindhu Manikandan; Bhavani Sre – Viduthalai Part 1 as Tamilarasi / Pappa; Shraddha Srinath – Irugapatru as Mithra Manohar; Trisha – Ponniyin Selvan: II as Kundavai
Best Supporting Actor	Best Supporting Actress
**Fahadh Faasil – Maamannan as Rathnavelu**; M. S. Bhaskar – Parking as S. Ilamparuthi; S. J. Suryah – Mark Antony as Jackie Pandian and Madhan Pandian; Vinayakan – Jailer as Varman; Yogi Babu – Maaveeran as Kumar	**Anjali Nair – Chithha**; Raichal Rabecca – Good Night as Maha; Rama – Parking as Selvi; Saritha – Maaveeran as Eshwari; Subatra Robert – Bommai Nayagi as Kayalvizhi
Best Music Director	Best Lyricist
**Dhibu Ninan Thomas & Santhosh Narayanan – Chithha**; Anirudh Ravichander – Jailer; Anirudh Ravichander – Leo; A. R. Rahman – Ponniyin Selvan: II; Ilaiyaraaja – Viduthalai Part 1; G. V. Prakash Kumar – Vaathi	**Ilango Krishnan – "Aga Naga" from Ponniyin Selvan: II**; Ilango Krishnan – "Veera Raja Veera" from Ponniyin Selvan: II; Krithika Nelson – "Oru Vezham" from Nitham Oru Vaanam; Ku Karthik – "Nira" from Takkar; Suka – "Onnoda Nadandhaa" from Viduthalai Part 1
Best Playback Singer – Male	Best Playback Singer – Female
**Haricharan** – "**Chinnanjiru Nilave**" **from** **Ponniyin Selvan: II**; Anirudh Ravichander – "Hukum" from Jailer; Anirudh Ravichander – "Badass" from Leo; Sean Roldan – "Naan Gaali" from Good Night; Sid Sriram and Gautham Vasudev Menon – "Nira" from Takkar; Vijay Yesudas – "Nenjame Nenjame" from Maamannan	**Karthika Vaidyanathan** – "**Kangal Edho" from Chithha**; K. S. Chithra and Harini – "Veera Raja Veera" from Ponniyin Selvan: II; Shakthisree Gopalan – "Aga Naga" from Ponniyin Selvan: II; Shakthisree Gopalan – "Nenjame Nenjame" from Maamannan; Shilpa Rao – "Kaavaalaa" from Jailer
Critics Best Actor	Critics Best Actress
**Siddharth – Chithha as Eeswaran**	**Aishwarya Rajesh** **– Farhana as Farhana / Isha**; **Aparna Das** **– Dada as Sindhu Manikandan**

==== Telugu cinema ====
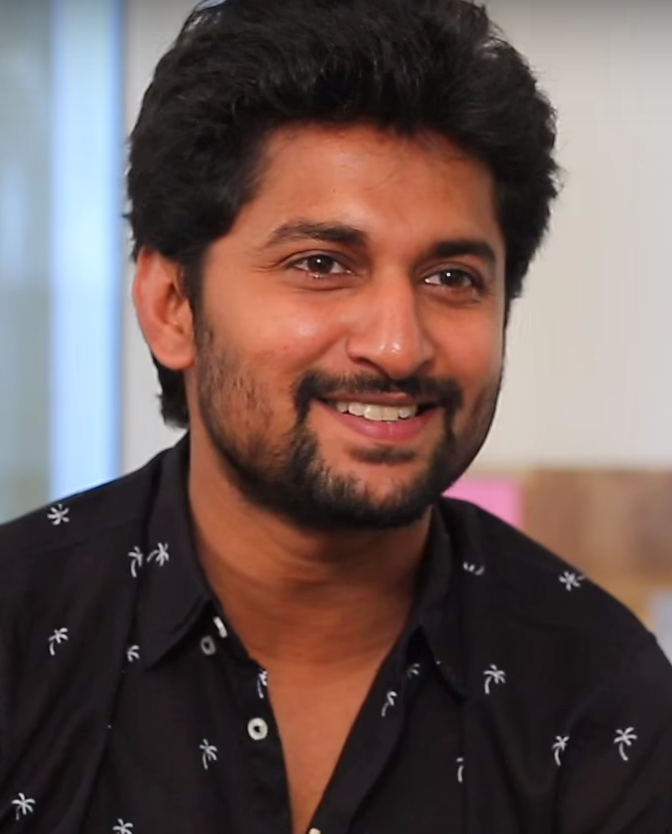
Nani, Best Actor (Telugu) winner

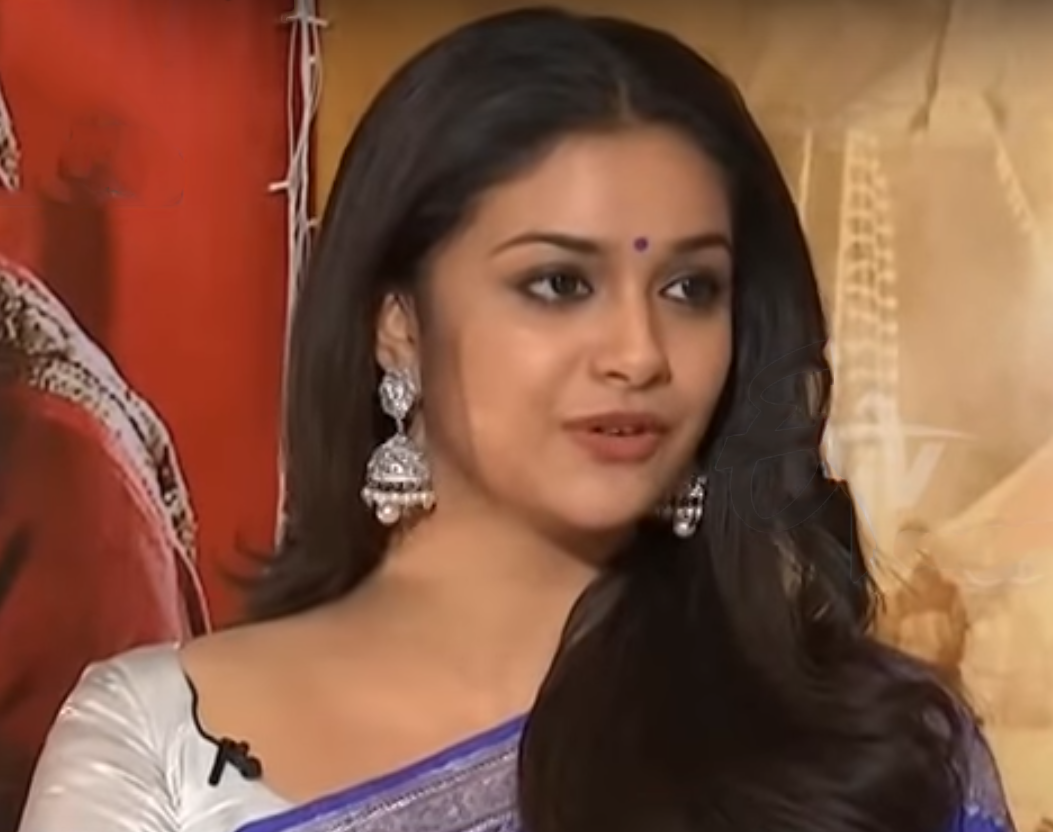
Keerthy Suresh, Best Actress (Telugu) winner

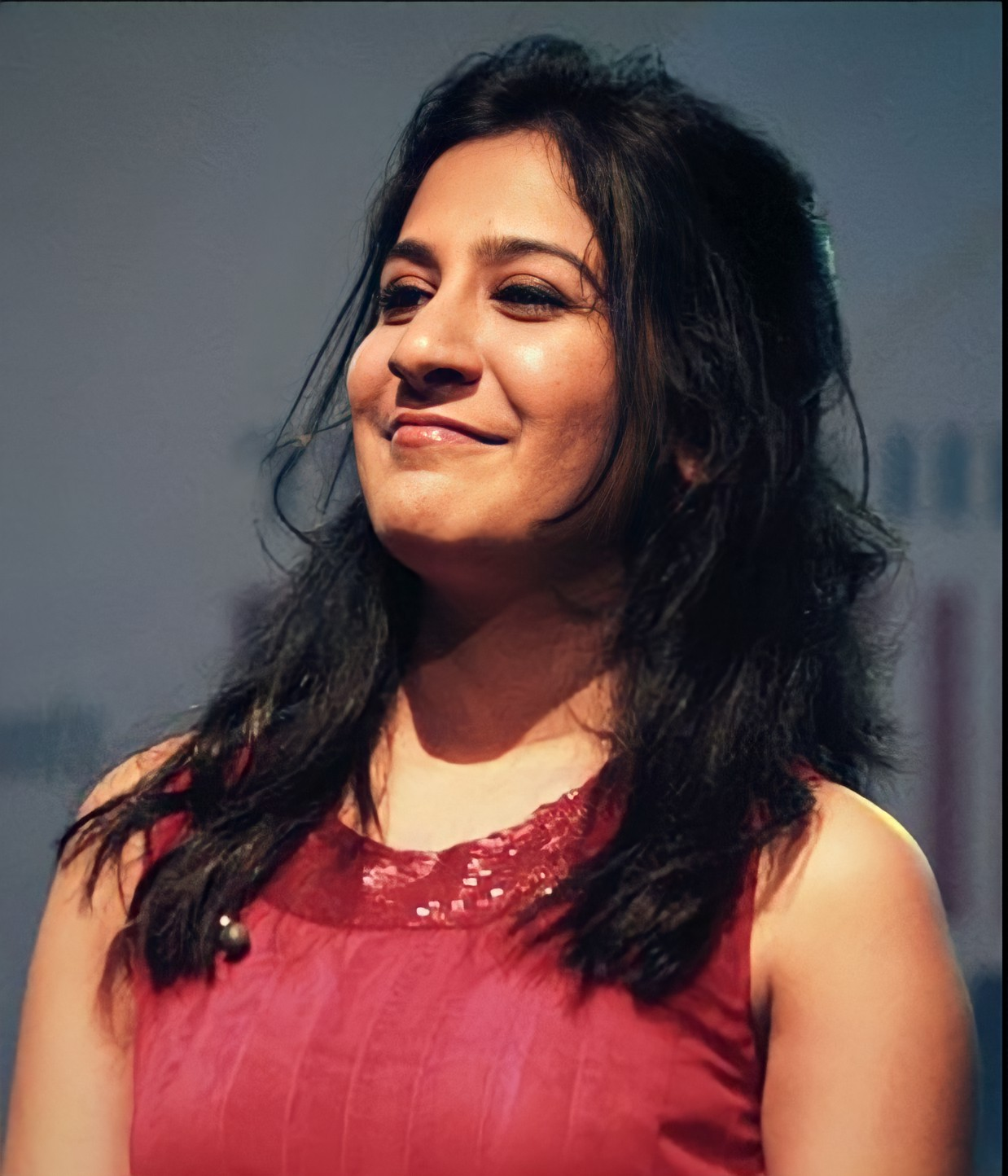
Shweta Mohan, Best Female Playback Singer (Telugu) winner

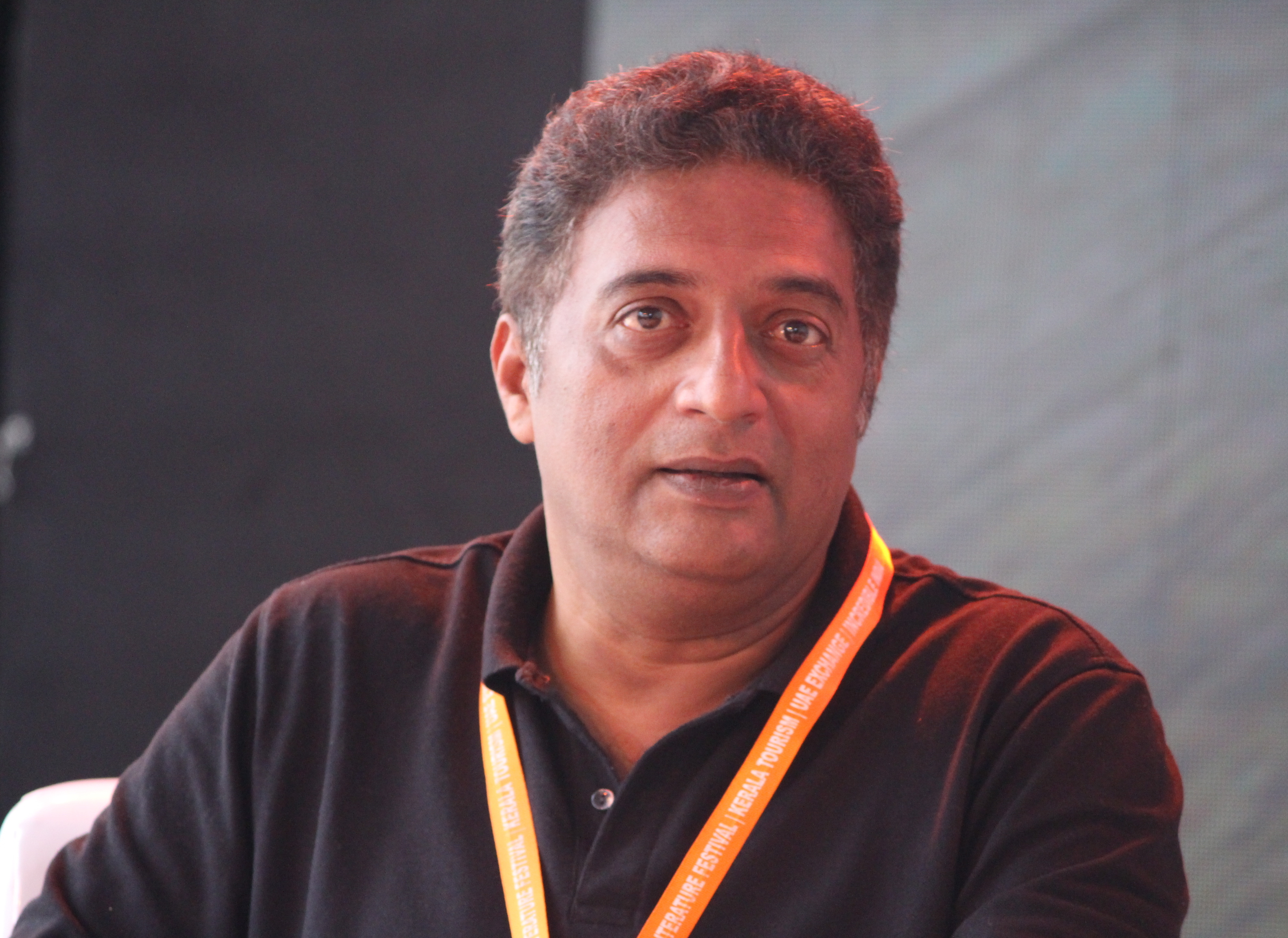
Prakash Raj, Critics Best Actor (Telugu) winner

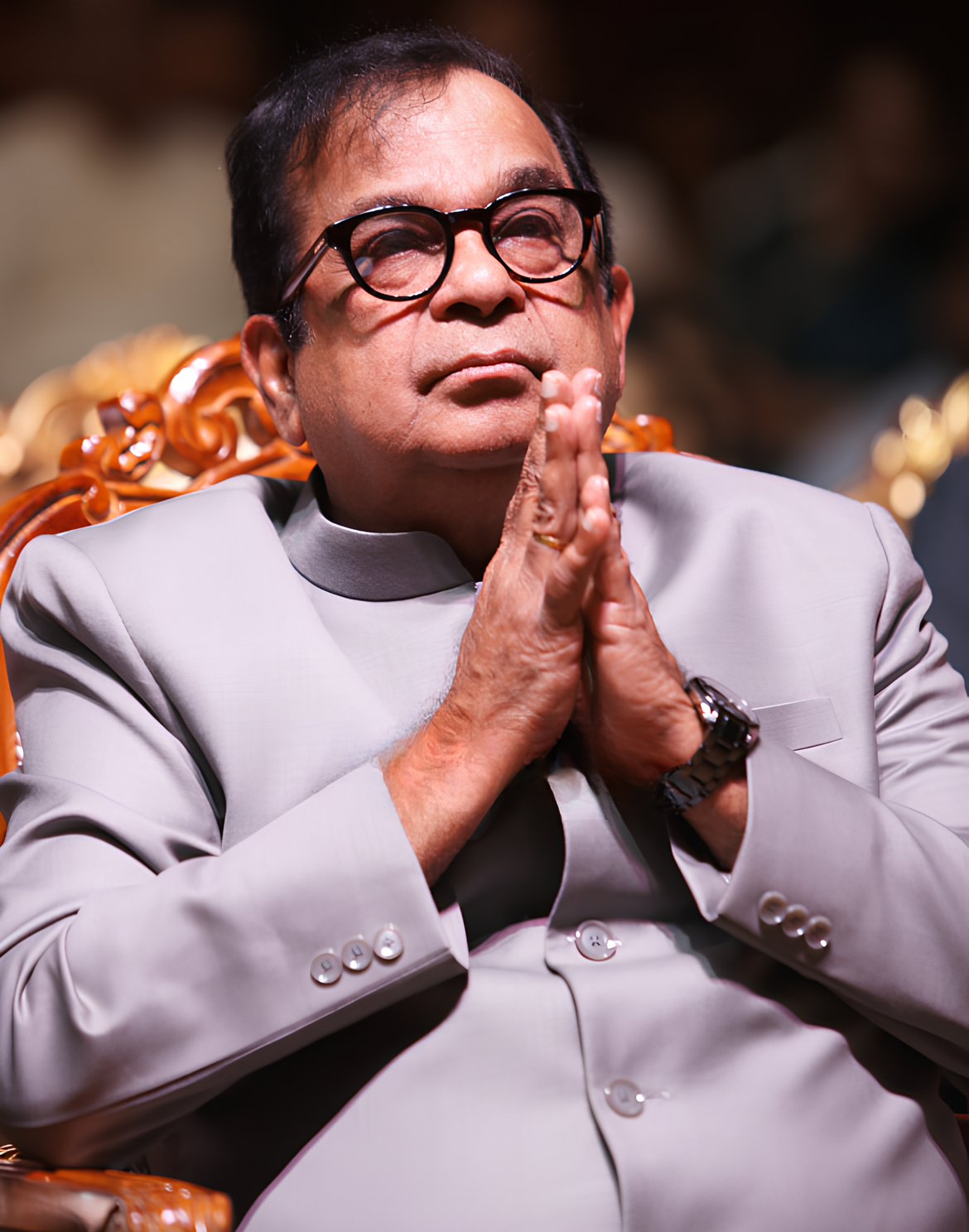
Brahmanandam, Best Supporting Actor (Telugu) winner

Best Film	Best Director
**Balagam – Hanshitha Reddy and Harshith Reddy, producers**; Baby – Sreenivasa Kumar Naidu, producer; Dasara – Sudhakar Cherukuri, producer; Hi Nanna – Mohan Cherukuri, Murthy K. S. and Vijender Reddy Teegala, producers; Miss Shetty Mr Polishetty – Pramod Uppalapati and V. Vamsi Krishna Reddy, producers; Samajavaragamana – Razesh Danda, producer; Salaar: Part 1 – Ceasefire – Vijay Kiragandur, producer	**Venu Yeldandi – Balagam**; Anil Ravipudi – Bhagavanth Kesari; Karthik Varma Dandu – Virupaksha; Prashanth Neel – Salaar: Part 1 – Ceasefire; Sai Rajesh Neelam – Baby; Shouryuv – Hi Nanna; Srikanth Odela – Dasara
Best Actor	Best Actress
**Nani – Dasara as Dharani**; Anand Deverakonda – Baby as Anand; Balakrishna – Bhagavanth Kesari as Nelakonda Bhagavanth Kesari; Chiranjeevi – Waltair Veerayya as Waltair Veerayya; Dhanush – Sir as Bala Gangadhar Thilak; Nani – Hi Nanna as Viraj; Naveen Polishetty – Miss Shetty Mr Polishetty as Sidhu Polishetty; Prakash Raj – Ranga Maarthaanda as Raghava Rao	**Keerthy Suresh – Dasara as Vennela**; Anushka Shetty – Miss Shetty Mr Polishetty as Anvitha Ravali Shetty; Mrunal Thakur – Hi Nanna as Yashna / Varsha; Samantha – Shaakuntalam as Shakuntala; Vaishnavi Chaitanya – Baby as Vaishnavi
Best Supporting Actor	Best Supporting Actress
**Brahmanandam – Ranga Maarthaanda as Chakrapani**; **Ravi Teja – Waltair Veerayya as Vikram Sagar**; Dheekshith Shetty – Dasara as Siddham Suryam; Kota Jayaram – Balagam as Gajula Ailayya; Naresh – Samajavaragamana as Uma Maheswara Rao; Vishnu Oi – Keedaa Cola as Sikander	**Rupa Lakshmi – Balagam as Lakshmi**; Ramya Krishna – Ranga Maarthaanda as Raju Garu; Rohini – Writer Padmabhushan as Saraswati; Shyamala – Virupaksha as Savitri; Sreeleela – Bhagavanth Kesari as Vijayalakshmi; Sriya Reddy – Salaar: Part 1 – Ceasefire as Radha Rama; Swathi Reddy – Month of Madhu as Lekha
Best Music Director	Best Lyricist
**Vijai Bulganin** **– Baby**; Bheems Ceciroleo – Balagam; Devi Sri Prasad – Waltair Veerayya; Hesham Abdul Wahab – Hi Nanna; Hesham Abdul Wahab – Kushi; Santhosh Narayanan – Dasara	**Anantha Sriram – "O Rendu Prema Meghaalila" from Baby**; Anantha Sriram – "Gaaju Bomma" from Hi Nanna; Kasarla Shyam – "Chamkeela Angeelesi" from Dasara; Kasarla Shyam – "Ooru Palletooru" from Balagam; P. Raghu 'Relare Rela' – "Lingi Lingi Lingidi" from Kota Bommali PS
Best Playback Singer – Male	Best Playback Singer – Female
**Sreerama Chandra – "O Rendu Prema Meghaalila" from Baby**; Anurag Kulkarni – "Samayama" from Hi Nanna; Hesham Abdul Wahab – "Kushi Title Song" from Kushi; P V N S Rohit – "Premisthunna" from Baby; Ram Miriyala – "Potti Pilla" from Balagam; Sid Sriram – "Aradhya" from Kushi	**Shweta Mohan – "Mastaaru Mastaaru" from Sir**; Chinmayi Sripaada – "Aradhya" from Kushi; Chinmayi Sripaada – "Odiyamma" from Hi Nanna; Dhee – "Chamkeela Angeelesi" from Dasara; Mangli – "Ooru Palletooru" from Balagam; Shakthisree Gopalan – "Ammaadi" from Hi Nanna
Critics Best Actor	Critics Best Actress
**Naveen Polishetty** **– Miss Shetty Mr Polishetty as Sidhu Polishetty**; **Prakash Raj** **– Ranga Maarthaanda as Raghava Rao**	**Vaishnavi Chaitanya – Baby as Vaishnavi**

=== Technical awards ===
Best Cinematographer
- **Sathyan Sooryan (Telugu) – Dasara**
- **Ravi Varman (Tamil) – Ponniyin Selvan: II**
Best Choreography
- **Prem Rakshith** **(Telugu) – "Dhoom Dhaam Dhosthaan" from Dasara**
Best Production Design
- **Kolla Avinash (Telugu) – Dasara**
- **Thota Tharani** **(Tamil) – Ponniyin Selvan: II**

=== Special awards ===
Lifetime Achievement Award
- **Srinath**
Critics Best Film (Director)
- **Baby** **(Telugu) – Sai Rajesh Neelam**
- **Viduthalai Part 1** **(Tamil) – Vetrimaaran**
- **Kaathal – The Core** **(Malayalam) – Jeo Baby**
- **Pinki Elli (Kannada) – Prithvi Konanur**
Best Debut Director
- **Shouryuv (Telugu) – Hi Nanna**
- **Srikanth Odela (Telugu) – Dasara**
Best Male Debut
- **Sangeeth Sobhan (Telugu) – Mad as Damodhar**
- **Shishir Baikady (Kannada) – Daredevil Musthafa as Jamal Abdul Musthafa Hussain**
Best Female Debut
- **Amrutha Prem (Kannada) – Tagaru Palya as Jyothi**

== Superlatives ==
Films with multiple nominations
Nominations	Film
11	Ponniyin Selvan: II
9	Hi Nanna
9	Sapta Saagaradaache Ello
8	Baby
8	Balagam
8	Dasara
7	Chithha
7	Kaatera
7	Kousalya Supraja Rama
7	Swathi Mutthina Male Haniye
7	Tagaru Palya
6	Maamannan
6	Viduthalai Part 1
5	Iratta
5	Kaathal – The Core
4	19.20.21
4	Ayisha
4	Daredevil Musthafa
4	Jawanum Mullapoovum
4	Maaveeran
4	Pachuvum Athbutha Vilakkum
4	Purusha Pretham
3	2018
3	Bhagavanth Kesari
3	Jailer
3	Janaki Jaane
3	Miss Shetty Mr Polishetty
3	Nanpakal Nerathu Mayakkam
3	Neru
3	Ranga Maarthaanda
3	RDX: Robert Dony Xavier
3	Romancham
3	Salaar: Part 1 – Ceasefire
3	Waltair Veerayya
2	Falimy
2	Good Night
2	Leo
2	Madhura Manohara Moham
2	Parking
2	Pinki Elli
2	Samajavaragamana
2	Santhosham
2	Sir
2	Takkar
2	Thankam
2	Thuramukham
2	Virupaksha

Films with multiple awards (including non-competitive)
Awards	Film
7	Chithha
6	Dasara
5	Baby
5	Ponniyin Selvan: II
4	Sapta Saagaradaache Ello
3	Balagam
3	Daredevil Musthafa
3	Kaathal – The Core
2	2018
2	RDX: Robert Dony Xavier
2	Ranga Maarthaanda
2	Sapta Saagaradaache Ello – Side A
2	Tagaru Palya

== Presenters and performers ==
Performers
Performer	Work
Aparna Balamurali	Dance
Gayatri Bhardwaj	Dance
Krithi Shetty	Dance
Mrunal Thakur	Dance
Raashii Khanna	Dance
Saniya Iyappan	Dance
