= Poornachandra (name) =

Poornachandra is a given name. Notable people with the name include:

- Poornachandra Tejaswi
- Poornachandra Mysore
- Poornachandra Tejaswi (composer)
