= Imbam =

2023 Indian family romance drama

- Theatrical release poster
- Directed by: Sreejith Chandran
- Written by: Sreejith Chandran
- Produced by: Mathew Mampra
- Starring: Lalu Alex; Deepak Parambol; Darshana S. Nair; Meera Vasudevan
- Cinematography: Nijay Jayan
- Edited by: Kuriakose Francis Kudasseril
- Music by: P S Jayhari
- Production company: Mampra Cinemas
- Distributed by: Mampra Cinemas
- Release date: 27 October 2023
- Running time: 123 minutes
- Country: India
- Language: Malayalam

Imbam is a 2023 Indian Malayalam-language family romance drama written and directed by Sreejith Chandran. The film was produced by Mathew Mampra under the banner of Mampra Cinemas. The film stars Deepak Parambol, Lalu Alex, Meera Vasudevan, Irshad Ali and Lal Jose in lead roles.

P. S. Jayhari composed music for the movie. Nijay Jayan handled the cinematography, while Kuriakos Francis Kutasseril was in charge of the editing section.

== Synopsis ==
The film tells the story of a young cartoonist Nidhin and his emotional intimacy with an old publishing house called 'Shabdam', its fifty-five-year-old owner, 'Karunakaran', and the lady proof-reader 'Kathambari' of the same office.

The narrative centers on Kozhikode, delving into the challenges faced by students at an arts college. Karunakaran, a friend of the college principal and the Chief Editor of 'Shabdham' finds his life unexpectedly intertwined with various individuals. Among them is Nidhin, a young man who crosses paths with Karunakaran. Financial struggles lead Karunakaran into conflict with Premarajan, the youth president of a political party. Against this backdrop, the story unfolds, exploring themes of love, friendship, and familial bonds.

== Cast ==
- Lalu Alex as Karunakaran
- Deepak Parambol as Nidhin Samuel
- Meera Vasudevan as Maithily Swaminathan
- Darsana S Nair as Kathambari
- Irshad Ali as Premarajan
- Lal Jose as Devan
- Divya M. Nair as Adv. Revathy
- Shivaji Guruvayoor as Adv. Bhaskara Pillai
- Vijayan Karanthoor as Security Nair
- Navas Vallikkunnu as Ahammad
- Kalesh Ramanand as Manoj
- Boban Samual as Hareesh
- Mathew Mampra as Prof. Emmanuel

== Music ==
Imbam

Soundtrack album by P S Jayhari
- Released: 2023
- Genre: Feature film soundtrack
- Language: Malayalam
- Label: Magic Frames

P S Jayhari chronology
Santhosham (2023)	Imbam (2023)

The original background score and songs are composed by P S Jayhari. The lyrics were penned by Vinayak Sasikumar. The song "Aarambham" was sung by Vineeth Sreenivasan. The music rights of the film were bagged by Magic Frames Music.

Track listing
No.	Title	Lyrics	Music	Singer(s)	Length
1.	"Aarambham"	Vinayak Sasikumar	P S Jayhari	Vineeth Sreenivasan	3:57
2.	"Mayika"	Vinayak Sasikumar	P S Jayhari	Sreekanth Hariharan; Meenakshi ML	4:22
3.	"Thoovanamake"	Vinayak Sasikumar	P S Jayhari	Hesham Abdul Wahab	4:19
4.	"Soubhagyam"	Vinayak Sasikumar	P S Jayhari	Sithara Krishnakumar	4:14
Total length:					16.12

== Release ==
=== Theatrical ===
The film was released on 27 October 2023. The official trailer was unveiled by Malayalam actor Sunny Wayne and Asif Ali. The production company and lead actor Deepak Parambol announced the release date of the film through their social media handles.

=== Home media ===
The film was digitally released on 18 October 2025 through Sun NXT.

== Reception ==
Imbam received mixed reviews. Mathrubhumi said 'The writer has managed to bring the different love expressions of many generations to the audience through the script. The times of India 'Samayam' gave a rating of 3/5 and said a veteran actor like Lalu Alex could have acted beautifully in the sentimental scenes, he is underutilized even though some of those scenes would have suited the story of the film.
