= Family Drama (2024 film) =

2024 Indian dark comedy film

- Theatrical release poster
- Directed by: Akarsh HP
- Written by: Akarsh HP
- Produced by: Dabbugudi Murali Krishna
- Starring: Abhay; Sindhu Sreenivasa Murthy; Rekha Kudligi
- Cinematography: Sidharth Sunil
- Edited by: Ashish Hulakund
- Music by: Chethan Ammaiah
- Production company: DMK Entertainments
- Distributed by: KRG Studios
- Release date: 26 July 2024
- Running time: 150 minutes
- Country: India
- Language: Kannada

Family Drama is a 2024 Indian Kannada-language dark comedy film written and directed by Akarsh HP in his directorial debut. The film stars Abhay, Sindhu Sreenivasa Murthy, Rekha Kudligi, Poornachandra Mysore, Ananya Amar, Aashith, Mahadev Hadapad, Malathesha, Veeresh, Arun Murthy, and Suraj Ravikiran.

The film was released theatrically on 26 July 2024 and opened to positive to mixed reviews.

== Cast ==
- Abhay S. as Abhay
- Sindhu Sreenivasa Murthy as Divya
- Rekha Kudligi as Lakshmi
- Poornachandra Mysore as Praksha
- Ananya Amar as Shruthi
- Aashith as Toby
- Mahadev Hadapad
- Malathesha
- Veeresh as Vishnu
- Arun Murthy
- Suraj Ravikiran as Joji

== Production ==
In 2023, Akarsh HP met Abhay through a mutual friend. Abhay was looking for his next project after Daredevil Musthafa (2023) and wondered whether Akarsh had any stories suitable for him. Akarsh and Abhay discussed a few stories, but Abhay wasn't totally interested in the stories he narrated. Then Akarsh narrated to him a story he had had since 2017. Abhay liked it, so Akarsh began working on developing it into a full-fledged script. Akarsh chose Rekha to play the mother role, as he has already worked as an assistant director in the film she acted in earlier. He and Sindhu Sreenivasa Murthy collaborated in a documentary film about filmmakers earlier. A few months later, he met her and offered her a cameo role in this film, but she asked him to offer one of the main roles. The filming began in January 2024 and wrapped up in March 2024. The shooting of the film was completed within thirty-one days in forty-two locations. Apart from acting, Abhay also serves as an executive producer of the film.

=== Marketing ===
The production team used six hundred fake currency notes to promote this film. The fake notes have the poster and QR code for the trailer of the film printed on them. A promo song featuring Akarsh and Siri Ravikumar and sung by the latter was released.

== Soundtrack ==
The soundtrack of the film was composed by Chethan Ammaiah.

Track listing
No.	Title	Lyrics	Singer(s)	Length
1.	"Sathyad Mane Haala"	Sharath Vashisht	Rajesh Krishnan	2:48
2.	"Li Li Family Li"	Sharath Vashisht	Vasuki Vaibhav	3:55
3.	"Hanging on the wall"	Chethan Ammaiah	Siri Ravikumar	2:20
4.	"Shimmi Shimmi"	Sharath Vashisht	Chethan Ammaiah	3:00
5.	"Disco Song"	Sharath Vashisht	Srishti Ekanth	3:41
Total length:				15:44

== Release ==
=== Theatrical ===
Family Drama was theatrically released in India on 26 July 2024 across Karnataka in limited screens and managed to run only for a few days.

=== Home media ===
The digital rights of the movie was acquired by Amazon Prime and started premiered on 20 September 2024.

== Reception ==
The film opened to positive to mixed reviews with appreciation towards direction, story and the performances however criticism was drawn towards the run time of the movie.

Chokkapan S of The Times of India gave the film three-and-a-half out of five stars and wrote, "The movie - as promised by the director - is certainly a family outing, if you are ready to forgive the gore leading towards the denouement." Shashiprasad SM of the Times Now gave it three out of five stars and wrote, "Best enjoyed with kids and adults who simply love silly acts and laugh at almost every joke whether it is funny or not."

Pranati A S of Deccan Herald gave it three out of five stars and wrote, "The core plot of the film is interesting. But the subplots around the film, for example the love story between Abhay and his girlfriend Shruthi (Ananya Amar), seem exaggerated." Sunayana Suresh of The South First gave it three-and-a-half out of five stars and wrote, "Family Drama is an elevated experience in cinema halls also because of its formidable and talented cast. Every bit of the casting is spot on."

Vivek M.V. of The Hindu gave the film a positive review and wrote, "Family Drama is a refreshing attempt at cracking a genre less explored in Kannada cinema, and music director Chethan Ammaiah also deserves special mention for enhancing the vibrant flavour in the second half." A Sharadhaa of Cinema Express wrote, "The screenplay oscillates between moments of laughter and introspection with ease. The three lead actors—Abhay, Sindhu Sreenivasan, and Rekha—engage in a delightful game of one-upmanship, each trying to outdo the others in their performances." Subha J. Rao of The News Minute gave the film a positive review, praised the performances of the cast, and considered "a little trimming would have made the film work even better than it does."
