= BB5 (film) =

- Directed by: Janardhan N.
- Written by: Janardhan N.
- Produced by: Shiva Home Talkies
- Starring: Poornachandra Mysore; Radhika Chetan
- Cinematography: Vikram Yoganand; Chethan Royie
- Edited by: Srikanth
- Music by: Chethan Kumar Shastry
- Production company: Shivahome Talkies
- Release date: 26 May 2017
- Country: India
- Language: Kannada

BB5 is a 2017 Indian Kannada language thriller film written and directed by Janardhan N. featuring Poornachandra Mysore and Radhika Chetan in the lead roles. Rajesh Nataranga, Rashmi Prabhakar and Giriraj B. M. feature in key supporting roles. The score and soundtrack for the film is by Chethan Kumar Shastry and the cinematography is by Chethan Royie.

The film was released on 26 May 2017.

== Cast ==
- Poornachandra Mysore
- Radhika Chetan as Kriti
- Rajesh Nataranga
- Rashmi Prabhakar
- Giriraj B. M.

== Production ==
Poornachandra Mysore plays a studios college student in the film.

== Soundtrack ==
BB5

Soundtrack album by Chethan Kumar Shastry
- Genre: Feature film soundtrack
- Language: Kannada

The film's score and soundtrack was composed by Chethan Kumar Shastry. The lyrics for the songs were written by Janardhan. N.

Tracklist
No.	Title	Lyrics	Singer(s)	Length
1.	"Putta Putta"	Janardhan. N	Rajesh Krishnan	4:07
2.	"Bogase"	Janardhan. N	Sangeetha Katti	2:16

== Reception ==
Times of India rated it as 3 out of 5.
