= Srikanth Odela =

Indian film director, writer

- Occupations: Film director; Screenwriter
- Years active: 2016–present
- Known for: Dasara; The Paradise
- Awards: Filmfare Award for Best Debut Director (2024); SIIMA Award for Best Director – Telugu (2024)

Srikanth Odela is an Indian film director and screenwriter who works in Telugu cinema. He is born in Karimnagar, Telangana. He made his directorial debut with Dasara, which emerged as a commercial success at the box office, grossing over ₹121 crore worldwide. He won a Filmfare Award and a SIIMA Award for the film.

== Career ==
Odela worked as an assistant director for Sukumar in Nannaku Prematho (2016) and Rangasthalam (2018). He later directed his first feature, Dasara starring Nani. The film garnered critical acclaim and became a box office success, crossing the ₹100 crore mark and becoming the highest-grossing film in Nani's career.

In 2024, Odela announced his second film with Nani again, titled The Paradise. In December the same year, he announced his third film with Chiranjeevi, tenatively titled Mega157, which is being presented by Nani and produced again by Sudhakar Cherukuri, under SLV Cinemas.

== Personal life ==
Srikanth tied the knot on 31 May 2023 in a traditional ceremony held in his hometown of Godavarikhani.

== Filmography ==
Key
†	Denotes films that have not yet been released

Year	Title	Ref.
2023	Dasara	
2026	The Paradise	

== Awards and nominations ==
Award	Category	Work	Result	Ref.
69th Filmfare Awards South	Best Debut Director	Dasara	Won	
12th South Indian International Movie Awards	Best Director – Telugu	Dasara	Won	
12th South Indian International Movie Awards	Best Debut Director – Telugu	Dasara	Nominated	
