= Dasara (film) =

2023 Telugu film by Srikanth Odela

- Promotional poster
- Directed by: Srikanth Odela
- Written by: Srikanth Odela; Jella Srinath; Arjuna Paturi; Vamsi Krishna P.
- Produced by: Sudhakar Cherukuri; Ramana Rao Rudrapati
- Starring: Nani; Keerthy Suresh; Dheekshith Shetty; Shine Tom Chacko
- Cinematography: Sathyan Sooryan
- Edited by: Naveen Nooli
- Music by: Santhosh Narayanan
- Production company: SLV Cinemas
- Distributed by: Sri Venkateswara Film Distributors (Telangana & Andhra Pradesh; KRG Studios (Karnataka); AA Films (North India); Phars Film Co. (Overseas)
- Release date: 30 March 2023
- Running time: 159 minutes
- Country: India
- Language: Telugu
- Budget: ₹65 crore
- Box office: est. ₹121 crore

Dasara is a 2023 Indian Telugu-language action drama film directed by Srikanth Odela (in his directoral debut) and produced by Sudhakar Cherukuri. It stars an ensemble cast of Nani, Dheekshith Shetty, Keerthy Suresh, Shine Tom Chacko, Samuthirakani, P. Sai Kumar and Shamna Kasim. The film marks the directorial debut of Odela and Chacko's acting debut in Telugu cinema. Santhosh Narayanan composed the soundtrack and background score, while the cinematography and editing were by Sathyan Sooryan and Naveen Nooli.

The film was announced in October 2021. Principal photography commenced in March 2022 and ended in January 2023. The film is set around Singareni Coal Mines in Veerlapalli village near Godavarikhani and Ramagundam cities of Telangana.

Dasara was released on 30 March 2023 to positive reviews from critics and emerged as a commercial success at the box office, grossing over ₹121 crore worldwide.

== Plot ==
In 2009, Dharani, a reckless young man who steals coal for a living, lives in the coal-mining village of Veerlapally, where pervasive alcoholism plagues the local women. Dharani spends most of the time with his best friends, Siddham Suryam "Suri" and Vennela. Though Dharani has secretly harboured love for Vennela since childhood, he steps aside upon discovering that Suri and Vennela love each other. When Vennela's mother, Ramanamma, rejects Suri due to his criminal habits, Dharani intervenes and arranges their marriage by winning a local cricket match, which secures Suri a position as the cashier at the village's coveted "Silk" bar, as promised by Chinnappa Nambi, son of the village Sarpanch candidate, Thurpugutta Shivanna.

At the bar, a fight erupts between Dharani's group and Chinna Nambi's henchmen, resulting in the bar's destruction and the arrest of Dharani and his friends. Rajanna, Shivanna's estranged half-brother, bails them out. In response, Suri convinces Rajanna to run for the upcoming Sarpanch election. Supported by local women voting for the first time, Rajanna wins the election, appointing Dharani as his deputy and finalizing Vennela and Suri's wedding. Following the nuptials, Suri discovers Dharani's past sacrifice. Before he could respond, a masked gang ambushes the group. In the brutal chase, several friends of Dharani are killed, and Suri is beheaded in front of a devastated Dharani.

Seeking vengeance, Dharani investigates the murders and discovers that Chinna Nambi organized the hit. Chinna Nambi's wife reveals her husband orchestrated Suri's death out of lust for Vennela, rather than political rivalry. To shield Vennela from Chinna Nambi, Dharani marries her on the 11th day of Suri's funeral rites. Though initially resentful of the forced marriage, Vennela gradually softens toward Dharani. On the day of Dasara, Chinna Nambi confronts Vennela, revealing his involvement in Suri's death as well as Dharani's long-standing love and devotion to her.

During the Ravana Dahanam event, Chinna Nambi's gang ambushes Dharani and his surviving friends. A violent battle ensues, wherein Dharani and his allies slaughter the hitmen. Before the police take him into custody, Dharani publicly decapitates Chinna Nambi in front of the entire village to avenge Suri. Seven years later, Dharani is released from prison. Returning to Veerlapally, he finds the community still crippled by alcoholic addiction. Realizing the systemic ruin caused by alcohol, he sets the "Silk" bar ablaze in full view of the villagers. Vennela runs to join him at the burning bar, where the two share a heartfelt reunion.

== Cast ==
- Nani as Dharani
- Keerthy Suresh as Vennela
- Dheekshith Shetty as Siddham Suryam "Suri"
- Dasara Siddhu as Chakali Venu, Dharani's friend
- Shine Tom Chacko as Thurpugutta Chinna Nambi
- Samuthirakani as Thurpugutta Shivanna, Chinna Nambi's father
- Raghu Babu as Babu Reddy
- Sai Kumar as Thurpugutta Rajanna, Shivanna's half-brother
- Jhansi as Ramanamma, Vennela's mother
- Shamna Kasim as Chinna Nambi's wife
- Sai Dheena as Bangaram
- Rajsekhar Aningi as Inspector Nagaraju
- Raviteja Nannimala as Dharani's friend
- Surabhi Prabhavathi as Suri's mother
- Silk Smitha as herself (in graffiti)

== Production ==
=== Development ===
In October 2021, Nani's next project was announced with the title Dasara under the direction of debutant Srikanth Odela, who assisted Sukumar in Nannaku Prematho and Rangasthalam. It is produced by Sudhakar Cherukuri under his banner, SLV Cinemas. The film was formally launched in February 2022.

Nani described Dasara as "pure raw, rustic, and adrenaline-rush of a film." The film is set in the backdrop of Singareni coal mines near Godavarikhani in Telangana.

=== Casting ===
Keerthy Suresh was cast as the female lead opposite Nani, which marks her second collaboration with him after Nenu Local, while Samuthirakani and Sai Kumar were signed on to play pivotal roles.

=== Filming ===
Principal photography commenced in March 2022. In April 2022, the makers shifted to Hyderabad to shoot a song. In July 2022, the third schedule commenced. The movie wrapped up shooting on 13 January 2023 and entered post production ahead of its 30 March release.

== Music ==
The film score and soundtrack album of the film is composed by Santhosh Narayanan. The music rights were acquired by Saregama. The first single titled "Dhoom Dhaam Dhosthaan" was released on 3 October 2022. The single "Dhoom Dhaam Dhosthaan" opened to positive reviews from many critics mainly praising the makeover of Nani and Santhosh Narayanan's unique composition. The second single titled "Ori Vaari" was released on 13 February 2023. The third single titled "Chamkeela Angeelesi" was released on 8 March 2023. The fourth single titled "Oh Ammalaalo Ammalaalo" was released on 24 March 2023. The fifth single titled "Cricket Rap" was released on 10 April 2023.

== Release ==
=== Theatrical ===
Dasara was theatrically released on 30 March 2023. It was released in Telugu and dubbed versions in Tamil, Kannada, Malayalam, and Hindi languages. The teaser of the film was released on 30 January 2023.

=== Home media ===
The digital rights of the film have been acquired by Netflix. The film was premiered on Netflix on 27 April 2023 in Telugu and dubbed versions of Tamil, Malayalam and Kannada languages. The Hindi version of the film was premiered on 25 May 2023.

== Reception ==
=== Critical response ===
Dasara received positive reviews from critics. On the review aggregator website Rotten Tomatoes, 86% of 7 critics' reviews are positive, with an average rating of 6/10.

Chirag Sehgal of News18 gave 4/5 stars and wrote "Nani's swag is unbeatable, but the never-seen-before climax sequence will give you goosebumps and is a complete package. Besides Nani's killer expressions and top-notch action sequences, it is a visual treat too. The makers create magic on screen with this never-seen-before climax and it is worth all the wait." 123Telugu gave 3.25/5 stars and wrote "Dasara is a gritty action drama that has Nani's outstanding performance. He shouldered the film all the way. Keerthy Suresh, Dheekshith Shetty and Shine Tom Chacko also performed well. The film is quite good technically. Barring a few laggy portions in the second half, the film is a perfect choice to enjoy the weekend."

Neeshita Nyayapati of The Times of India rated the film 3/5 stars and wrote "Dasara is not the film that leaves you with a smile at the end of it all, it also doesn't reinvent the wheel. Could it have been better? Sure. But Srikanth Odela and Nani make this slow burn work. So, credit where credit is due." Raghu Bandi of The Indian Express gave 3/5 stars and wrote "Nani's Dasara is a heartfelt attempt from the makers, but falters due to poor narration. Can be watched for the authentic dialect, and raw and gritty performances from the lead". Avad Mohammed of OTTplay gave 3/5 stars and wrote "Dasara is Srikanth Odela's debut film and for a first time director, he has done an impressive job. Though his storyline is simple and does not have standout moments, the manner in which he sets the film in a unique world and creates rustic characters is the best part." Janani K from India Today gave the film 3/5 stars and wrote "Director Srikanth Odela's Dasara, starring Nani, Keerthy Suresh and Deekshit Shetty, is a visually stunning revenge drama. With some clichés, Dasara has its heart in the right place."

Sushmita Dey from Times Now gave the movie 3/5 stars writing that, "the film's writing might seem to be smeared by conventional writing choices, which will remind us of some previous movies, but the performances by every single character, technical finesse, the strong drama, a beautiful bond like friendship, slick action sequences in the second half make it a 'paisa vasool' experience as a whole". Haricharan Pudipeddi from Hindustan Times wrote "Dasara pretty much uses every trick that's been used before when it comes to such stories. However, it still manages to leave a strong impact because of how it succeeds in sucking you into a world you haven't experienced before."

Sangeetha Devi Dundoo of The Hindu wrote "Srikanth Odela makes an assured directorial debut with the Telugu film 'Dasara', exploring caste politics in a mainstream format, backed by good performances from the cast led by Nani and Keerthy Suresh." Mukesh Manjunath from Film Companion appreciated Odela's direction and world-building but criticized the writing; moreover he praised Nani's performance and Narayanan's music. Telangana Today wrote "Dasara is another celebration of Telugu commercial cinema, with raw emotions from Srikanth Odela and an incredible performance by Nani".

== Accolades ==
| Award (Note: Awards, festivals and organizations are in alphabetical order.) | Date of ceremony (Note: Date is linked to the article about the awards held that year, wherever possible.) | Category | Recipient(s) | Result | Ref. |
|---|---|---|---|---|---|
| Filmfare Awards South | 3 August 2024 | Best Film – Telugu | Sudhakar Cherukuri | Nominated | |
| Filmfare Awards South | 3 August 2024 | Best Director – Telugu | Srikanth Odela | Nominated | |
| Filmfare Awards South | 3 August 2024 | Best Actor – Telugu | Nani | Won | |
| Filmfare Awards South | 3 August 2024 | Best Actress – Telugu | Keerthy Suresh | Won | |
| Filmfare Awards South | 3 August 2024 | Best Supporting Actor – Telugu | Dheekshith Shetty | Nominated | |
| Filmfare Awards South | 3 August 2024 | Best Music Director – Telugu | Santhosh Narayanan | Nominated | |
| Filmfare Awards South | 3 August 2024 | Best Lyricist – Telugu | Kasarla Shyam ("Chamkeela Angeelesi") | Nominated | |
| Filmfare Awards South | 3 August 2024 | Best Female Playback Singer – Telugu | Dhee ("Chamkeela Angeelesi") | Nominated | |
| Filmfare Awards South | 3 August 2024 | Best Cinematographer | Sathyan Sooryan | Won | |
| Filmfare Awards South | 3 August 2024 | Best Choreography | Prem Rakshith ("Dhoom Dhaam Dhosthaan") | Won | |
| Filmfare Awards South | 3 August 2024 | Best Production Design | Kolla Avinash | Won | |
| Filmfare Awards South | 3 August 2024 | Best Debut Director | Srikanth Odela | Won | |
| South Indian International Movie Awards | 14 September 2024 | Best Film – Telugu | Sudhakar Cherukuri | Nominated | |
| South Indian International Movie Awards | 14 September 2024 | Best Director – Telugu | Srikanth Odela | Won | |
| South Indian International Movie Awards | 14 September 2024 | Best Cinematographer – Telugu | Sathyan Sooryan | Nominated | |
| South Indian International Movie Awards | 14 September 2024 | Best Actor | Nani | Won | |
| South Indian International Movie Awards | 14 September 2024 | Best Actress – Telugu | Keerthy Suresh | Won | |
| South Indian International Movie Awards | 14 September 2024 | Best Supporting Actor – Telugu | Dheekshith Shetty | Won | |
| South Indian International Movie Awards | 14 September 2024 | Best Actor in a Negative Role – Telugu | Shine Tom Chacko | Nominated | |
| South Indian International Movie Awards | 14 September 2024 | Best Debut Director – Telugu | Srikanth Odela | Nominated | |
| South Indian International Movie Awards | 14 September 2024 | Best Music Director – Telugu | Santhosh Narayanan | Nominated | |
| South Indian International Movie Awards | 14 September 2024 | Best Lyricist – Telugu | Sri Mani ("Ori Vaari") | Nominated | |
| South Indian International Movie Awards | 14 September 2024 | Best Female Playback Singer – Telugu | Dhee ("Chamkeela Angeelesi") | Nominated | |
