= Athiran =

- Theatrical release poster
- Directed by: Vivek
- Screenplay by: P. F. Mathews; Ajai Rahul
- Story by: Vivek
- Produced by: Raju Mathew
- Starring: Fahadh Faasil; Sai Pallavi; Atul Kulkarni; Renji Panicker
- Cinematography: Anu Moothedath
- Edited by: Ayoob Khan
- Music by: Songs: P S Jayhari; Score: Ghibran
- Production company: Century Investments
- Distributed by: Century Films
- Release date: 12 April 2019
- Running time: 136 minutes
- Country: India
- Language: Malayalam

Athiran (transl. Boundless one) is a 2019 Indian Malayalam-language psychological thriller film directed by Vivek (in his directorial debut) and written by P. F. Mathews from a story by Vivek. It was produced by Raju Mathew through his production company Century Investments. The film stars Fahadh Faasil and Sai Pallavi with Atul Kulkarni, Renji Panicker, Shanthi Krishna and Sudev Nair in pivotal roles while Prakash Raj makes a cameo appearance. The film features original songs composed by debutant P. S. Jayhari with a film score by Ghibran. The story is set in a psychiatric asylum. The film has many similarities with the 2014 Hollywood film Stonehearst Asylum.

Principal photography began in November 2018 and was completed in January 2019 in a 55-day shoot, extensively shot in Ooty. The film was released on 12 April 2019 two days before the Vishu holiday.

== Plot ==
In 1967, a young girl named Nithya is found traumatized in the aftermath of her family’s murder and is believed to be mentally ill and dangerous. Years later, psychiatrist Dr. Kannan Nair visits a remote mental asylum run by Dr. Benjamin, where Nithya is secretly confined. Nair becomes suspicious of Benjamin’s methods and investigates the asylum, eventually becoming emotionally attached to Nithya and believing she is being wrongfully treated.

As events escalate, Nair discovers hidden areas of the asylum and a diary revealing Nithya’s past, including her royal lineage and traumatic history. Tensions rise as he tries to free her, leading to violent confrontations and an escape attempt.

In a final twist, it is revealed that “Dr. Nair” was actually Vinayan, Nithya’s cousin and a psychiatric patient suffering from schizophrenia. Much of what was shown, including parts of the asylum and Lakshmi’s presence, were hallucinations. Vinayan is revealed to have committed murders in the past, while Nithya was not the killer. The real Dr. Kannan Nair later exposes Vinayan’s actions, while Vinayan and Nithya are ultimately shown living together in isolation.

== Cast ==
- Fahadh Faasil as Dr. Mooledath Kannan Nair (Fake) / Vinayan, who suffers from Schizophrenia and Delusions
  - Master Iihan as Young Vinayan
- Sai Pallavi as Nadakkal Kovilakatthu Karthika Thirunaal Nithya Lakshmi alias "Nithya", Vinayan's cousin turned wife, Jayanarayana Varma's daughter, who has Autism
- Atul Kulkarni as Dr. Benjamin Diaz
- Lena as Renuka, Dr. Benjamin's secret girlfriend
- Renji Panicker as Nadakkal Kovilakatthu Jaya Narayana Varma, Nithya's father and Vinayan's uncle
- Sudev Nair as Jeevan Thomas, Nithya mental asylum friend, who suffers from Hyperacivity Disorder
- Shanthi Krishna as Nadakkal Kovilakatthu Lakshmi, Vinayan's mother, Nithya's aunt and Jayanarayana Varma's sister
- P. Balachandran as Balarama Verma
- Baiju V. K. as Shekara Verma
- Jayaprakash Kuloor as Hussain Bala
- Leona Lishoy as Anna Maria, a patient who suffers from Hysteria
- Nandhu as Avarachan
- Surabhi Lakshmi as Vadakkedath Kamala Lakshmi, a patient who suffers from Borderline Personality Disorder
- Vijay Menon as Professor P. Subrahmanya Iyer, a patient who suffers from Dissociative Disorder
- Rajesh Sharma as Driver
- Prakash Raj as the Real Dr. Mooledath Kannan Nair (Cameo appearance)

== Production ==
The title of the film was announced on 17 February 2019 alongside the first official poster. Athiran marks the directorial debut of Vivek. According to Vivek, the story was formed based on a real-life account combined with inspiration from a short story written by Edgar Allan Poe. He said: "the story idea came up after I went to a Kalari school in Thrippunithura, Kerala, where autistic students were performing with the same prowess as the school's other students". The screenplay was written by P. F. Mathews. When Vivek briefed the story idea to Fahadh two-and-a-half years ago, it was Fahadh who introduced him Mathews. Vivek himself titled the film. Vivek cites Ulladakkam, Sesham, and Devadoothan as the major inspirations for the film, and were also inspired by Shutter Island, A Cure for Wellness, and Stonehearst Asylum.

Principal photography began in November 2018. The film was extensively shot in Ooty, Tamil Nadu. Filming was completed on 21 January 2019. It took 55 days to complete the filming process. The film is set in a psychiatric facility.

== Accolades ==
Year	Award	Category	Recipient	Result	Notes
2020	22nd Asianet Film Awards	Best Jury Award	K. S. Harisankar	Won	

== Music ==
Athiran

Soundtrack album by P S Jayhari
- Released: 27 March 2019
- Genre: Feature film soundtrack
- Length: 10:58
- Language: Malayalam
- Label: Manorama Music

The film features three songs composed by debutant P S Jayhari, who was supposed to debut with the same director's shelved film Aanenkilum Allenkilum. The lyrics were written by Vinayak Sasikumar and Engandiyoor Chandrasekharan. The soundtrack album was released by Manorama Music.

Athiran (Original Motion Picture Soundtrack)
No.	Title	Lyrics	Singer(s)	Length
1.	"Aattuthottil"	Vinayak Sasikumar	P. Jayachandran, Gayathri Ayyappadas, Sarayu S. Nair	3:40
2.	"Pavizha Mazha"	Vinayak Sasikumar	K. S. Harisankar	3:53
3.	"Ee Thazhvara"	Engandiyoor Chandrasekharan	Amrita Jayakumar, Fejo	3:25

== Release ==
=== Theatrical ===
The film was released in theatres on 12 April 2019.

=== Home media ===
The film is digitally streaming in Malayalam on JioHotstar. It is also available in Hindi & Marathi language dubbed versions currently streaming on Ultra Play & Ultra Jhakaas app respectively.

== Reception ==
=== Critical reception ===
Rating 4 out of 5 stars, Sajin Srijith of The New Indian Express called the movie an Impressive, emotionally rewarding psychological thriller. Filmibeat.com rated it 3.5 and written, "Athiran isn't a routine entertainer but it remarkably keeps us hooked with the intelligence in the narrative. It definitely offers a unique experience for Malayalam movie audiences."

Sify has reviewed that the film is an engaging psycho thriller and rated 3/5. Deccan Chronicle rated the movie 3/5 Stars and stated, "It is a onetime watch for those who like psychological thrillers with some mind-bending and adrenaline rush moments."

The Times of India reviewer Anna Mathews rated it 2.5/5 and stated "While the film has thrills and is a venture with a difference, it lacks in some heft. There is a 'thrills for the sake of thrills' feel to the movie. But if you are in the mood for a adrenalin rush, 'Athiran' won't disappoint." S. R. Praveen of The Hindu reviewed the film as an enticing movie that falls short of expectations.

=== Box office ===
The film grossed $194,952 in the United Arab Emirates in the opening weekend (the second best opener of that weekend, behind Avengers: Endgame) and $255,663 in four weeks. In the opening weekend, it grossed $1,358 from two theatres in the United Kingdom, $14,230 (₹9.92 lakh) from 43 screens in the United States and $321 (₹22,372) from 2 screens in Canada. It collected $18,974 (₹13.17 lakh) in the US in three weeks.
