= RDX: Robert Dony Xavier (soundtrack) =

RDX

Soundtrack album by Sam C. S.
- Released: 8 September 2023
- Recorded: 2022–2023
- Genre: Feature film soundtrack
- Length: 22:39
- Language: Malayalam
- Label: Saregama
- Producer: Sam C. S.

Sam C. S. chronology
Nene Naa (2023)	RDX (2023)	Tamil Kudimagan (2023)

Singles from RDX: Robert Dony Xavier
- 1. "Halaballo" Released: 26 July 2023; 2. "Scene Mone" Released: 16 August 2023; 3. "Neela Nilave" Released: 24 August 2023; 4. "Adiyodadi" Released: 24 September 2023; 5. "Neela Nilave (Female Version)" Released: 16 October 2023; 6. "Veyilinte Punjiri" Released: 2 November 2023

RDX: Robert Dony Xavier is the soundtrack to the 2023 film of the same name directed by Nahas Hidhayath and produced by Sophia Paul under Weekend Blockbusters, starring Shane Nigam, Antony Varghese and Neeraj Madhav. The soundtrack featured original songs composed by Sam C. S. and lyrics written by Manu Manjith, and rap numbers performed by Fejo and Neeraj Madhav. The soundtrack was released under the Saregama label on 8 September 2023.

== Background ==
In August 2022, producer Sophia Paul announced that Sam C. S. would compose the score for RDX; the film is his third Malayalam project, after Odiyan (2018) and Pakalum Paathiravum (2022), where he would compose the background scores. Since the film was set in the 1990s, Sam experimented on music that sounded authentic to the timeline which was reflected in the film's music. While composing the song "Neela Nilave" the crew were convinced that the song would become a hit upon release, which Sam was also convinced. He revealed that most of the romantic songs are natural, while romantic dance numbers would be less likely to be a success unlike those in Tamil and Telugu cinema. He was skeptical on such a song would become a hit in Malayalam but was overwhelmed with the audience reception.

== Release ==
The album was preceded by three songs as singles: "Hallabaloo" was released first on 26 July 2023. The song was written by Manu Manjith and performed by Benny Dayal, Ranjith K Govind, Naresh Iyer, Sam C. S. The second single "Scene Mone", a rap number performed by Neeraj Madhav and co-composed by Rzee was released on 16 August 2023. The third song "Neela Nilave" was released on 24 August 2023. The soundtrack was released through Saregama label on 8 September 2023 that featured in four tracks. Three more songs: "Adiyodadi", a rap number written and performed by Fejo was released on 24 September, a female version of "Neela Nilave" performed by Shweta Mohan was released on 16 October, and "Veyilinte Punjiri" by Hariharan on 2 November.

== Reception ==
Anjana George of The Times of India praised the music as it "seamlessly complements various combat styles depicted in the movie, resulting in a riveting experience." Anandu Suresh of The Indian Express wrote "Sam CS' background music that truly stands out, complementing the moments in an exceptional way", but however found the omission of "Halaballoo" to dampen the mood, as "it had the potential to enhance the overall experience." Sowmya Rajendran, writing for Moneycontrol, stated that Sam's music "pumping up the energy." "Neela Nilave" was considered to be one of the best Malayalam songs of 2023.

== Track listing ==
All music is composed by Sam C. S., except where noted.

Track listing
No.	Title	Lyrics	Singer(s)	Length
1.	"RDX Theme"	—	—	0:51
2.	"Halaballoo"	Manu Manjith	Benny Dayal, Ranjith K Govind, Naresh Iyer, Sam C. S.	3:44
3.	"Scene Mone" (co-composed by Rzee)	Neeraj Madhav	Neeraj Madhav	3:26
4.	"Neela Nilave"	Manu Manjith	Kapil Kapilan	4:13
5.	"Adiyodadi"	Fejo	Fejo	2:21
6.	"Neela Nilave" (Female Version)	Manu Manjith	Shweta Mohan	4:13
7.	"Veyilinte Punjiri"	Manu Manjith	Hariharan	3:49
Total length:				22:39

== Personnel ==
- Sam C. S. – composer (all tracks), producer (all tracks), musical arrangements (all tracks), programming (all tracks), backing vocalist (tracks: 4, 6)
- Abey Terrence – programming (track: 7)
- Yadu Krishnan – backing vocalist (track: 2)
- Joseph Vijay – guitars (tracks: 2, 4, 5, 6, 7), strings (tracks: 2, 4, 5, 6, 7)
- Rajesh – drums (track: 2)
- Kiran – flute (tracks: 4, 5, 6, 7)
- Kishore – sitar (tracks: 4, 6)
- Chennai String Orchestra – strings (tracks: 5, 7), brass (track: 5)
- C. D. Anbumani – recording engineer (Psalter Record Inn, Chennai) [all tracks], programming (tracks: 2, 4)
- Abhishek AR – recording engineer (Psalter Record Inn, Chennai) [all tracks]
- S. Aakash Edwin – recording engineer (Psalter Record Inn, Chennai) [all tracks]
- Balu Thankachan – mixing and mastering engineer (20db Sound Studios, Chennai) [tracks: 2, 4, 6]
- Onasis Mohan – mixing and mastering engineer (Psalter Record Inn, Chennai) [track: 5], programming (track: 5)
- Abin Pushpakaran – mixing and mastering engineer (Blu Academy, Chennai) [track: 7]
- Paul Daniel – mixing assistance (tracks: 2, 4)
- Hariharan – mixing assistance (tracks: 2, 4)
- K. Mahima Chowdhary – music production manager
- Kannan M. – music production manager
- Indhumathi – music production manager
- Sathyamurthy – music production manager
- Parthiban – music production manager
- B. Velavan – music co-ordinator

== Accolades ==
Accolades for RDX: Robert Dony Xavier
Award	Date of ceremony	Category	Recipient(s) and nominee(s)	Result	Ref.
Filmfare Awards South	3 August 2024	Best Music Director – Malayalam	Sam C. S.	Won	
Filmfare Awards South	3 August 2024	Best Male Playback Singer – Malayalam	Kapil Kapilan – ("Neela Nilave")	Won	
South Indian International Movie Awards	14–15 September 2024	Best Music Director – Malayalam	Sam C. S.	Nominated	
South Indian International Movie Awards	14–15 September 2024	Best Lyricist – Malayalam	Manu Manjith – ("Neela Nilave")	Nominated	
South Indian International Movie Awards	14–15 September 2024	Best Male Playback Singer – Malayalam	Kapil Kapilan – ("Neela Nilave")	Nominated	
