= Chithha (soundtrack) =

2023 soundtrack album

- Soundtrack album cover

Soundtrack album by Dhibu Ninan Thomas and Santhosh Narayanan
- Released: 27 September 2023
- Recorded: 2023
- Genre: Feature film soundtrack
- Length: 12:38
- Language: Tamil
- Label: Think Music
- Producer: Dhibu Ninan Thomas, Santhosh Narayanan
External audio
- Audio Jukebox on YouTube

Dhibu Ninan Thomas chronology
Nadhi (2023)	Chithha (2023)	Ajayante Randam Moshanam (2024)

Santhosh Narayanan chronology
Dasara (2023)	Chithha (2023)	Jigarthanda DoubleX (2023)

Singles from Chithha
- 1. "Kangal Edho" Released: 7 September 2023; 2. "Show Me The Way" Released: 11 September 2023; 3. "Unakku Thaan" Released: 22 September 2023

Chithha is the soundtrack to the 2023 Tamil-language drama film of the same name directed by S. U. Arun Kumar starring Siddharth, Nimisha Sajayan and Anjali Nair. The film's soundtrack featured three songs composed by Dhibu Ninan Thomas and one song composed by Santhosh Narayanan. Preceded by three singles, the soundtrack was released through Think Music on 27 September 2023. At the 69th Filmfare Awards South, both composers won the Filmfare Award for Best Music Director – Tamil.

== Album information ==
Chithha's soundtrack featured four songs—three of them, "Kangal Edho", "Theera Swasame" and "Show Me The Way" were composed by Dhibu Ninan Thomas; one song "Unakku Thaan" was composed by Santhosh Narayanan as a guest composer. "Unakku Thaan" served as the title song for the film.

The first single "Kangal Edho" was released on 7 September 2023. The song was written by Yugabharathi and performed by Pradeep Kumar and Karthika Vaidyanathan. The second single "Show Me The Way" which accompanied the film's teaser in the background was released as a single on 11 September 2023. The third single "Unakku Thaan" was accompanied with a music video directed by Deeraj Vaidy featuring Siddharth and Sahasra Shree, released on 22 September 2023. The song was written by Vivek and performed by Narayanan and Dhvani Kailas.

The soundtrack was released on 27 September 2023 in digital music platforms.

== Reception ==
Divya Venugopal of Radio Mirchi called "Kangal Edho" as an "endearing track that will grow on you". Krishna Selvaseelan of Tamil Guardian wrote "Although the score and songs often slip into the melodramatic, it does not detract too much from the intensity of the film." Rajasekar S. of The Federal called the songs as "soul-touching". Atchayaa Rajkumar of The News Minute found the film's music as "the perfect accompaniment to complement the highs and lows of the movie." Janani K. of India Today added that the music "aided well in creating the thrill".

Reviewing the trends of Tamil film music in 2023, Navein Darshan of The New Indian Express mentioned "Unakku Thaan" and called it as "the anthem of the year for every parental figure, celebrating the song with all their hearts." Karthik Srinivasan of Milliblog and Vipin Nair of Music Aloud ranked the song at 5th on their best of Indian film music in 2023. In their 2023 year-ender, analyzing best of music in Indian films and webseries, Devarsi Ghosh of Scroll.in mentioned "Unakku Thaan" as a soul-stirring number.

== Impact ==
The song "Unakku Thaan" became popular after the film's release, with numerous covers being surfaced. A cover of the song with vocals by S. P. Balasubrahmanyam generated via AI went viral. According to Darshan, "The thought that an AI can almost bring to life the voice of the legend we lost three years ago startled music lovers, especially the ones who belonged to the cassette era. The software-generated cover versions of recent famous songs and classics featuring voices of AR Rahman, Dhanush, Vijay, Sid Sriram and an amusing list of political leaders were widely consumed and shared by a significant portion of the crowd; to the point where AI covers have almost become a sub-genre of music now."

== Track listing ==
=== Tamil ===
Chithha (Original Motion Picture Soundtrack)
No.	Title	Lyrics	Music	Singer(s)	Length
1.	"Kangal Edho"	Yugabharathi	Dhibu Ninan Thomas	Pradeep Kumar, Karthika Vaidyanathan	4:02
2.	"Theera Swasame"	S. U. Arun Kumar	Dhibu Ninan Thomas	Kapil Kapilan	3:46
3.	"Show Me The Way"	Dhibu Ninan Thomas	Dhibu Ninan Thomas	Poorvi	1:14
4.	"Unakku Thaan"	Vivek	Santhosh Narayanan	Santhosh Narayanan, Dhvani Kailas	3:36
Total length:					12:38

=== Telugu ===
Chinna (Original Motion Picture Soundtrack)
No.	Title	Lyrics	Music	Singer(s)	Length
1.	"Kaalamedho"	Krishna Kanth	Dhibu Ninan Thomas	Chinmayi Sripaada, Nakul Abhyankar	4:03
2.	"Neeve Swasave"	Krishna Kanth	Dhibu Ninan Thomas	Sreekanth Hariharan	3:49
3.	"Show Me The Way"	Dhibu Ninan Thomas	Dhibu Ninan Thomas	Poorvi	1:14
4.	"Needhele"	Krishna Kanth	Santhosh Narayanan	Anurag Kulkarni, Dhvani Kailas	3:34
Total length:					12:41

=== Malayalam ===
Chitta (Original Motion Picture Soundtrack)
No.	Title	Lyrics	Music	Singer(s)	Length
1.	"Kannil Njano"	Joe Paul	Dhibu Ninan Thomas	Haricharan, Chinmayi Sripaada	4:03
2.	"Maayaa Vaasame"	Joe Paul	Dhibu Ninan Thomas	Benny Dayal	3:47
3.	"Show Me The Way"	Dhibu Ninan Thomas	Dhibu Ninan Thomas	Poorvi	1:14
4.	"Aalolam"	Joe Paul	Santhosh Narayanan	Aditya Ravindran, Dhvani Kailas	3:34
Total length:					12:39

=== Kannada ===
Chikku (Original Motion Picture Soundtrack)
No.	Title	Lyrics	Music	Singer(s)	Length
1.	"Kanna Baana"	Pramod Maravanthe	Dhibu Ninan Thomas	Haricharan, Chinmayi Sripaada	4:03
2.	"Enu Kaanade"	Pramod Maravanthe	Dhibu Ninan Thomas	Sreekanth Hariharan	3:49
3.	"Show Me The Way"	Dhibu Ninan Thomas	Dhibu Ninan Thomas	Poorvi	1:14
4.	"Ninageye"	Pramod Maravanthe	Santhosh Narayanan	Anurag Kulkarni, Dhvani Kailas	3:34
Total length:					12:41

== Background score ==
Chithha

Film score by Vishal Chandrashekhar
- Released: 15 March 2024
- Recorded: 2023
- Genre: Film score
- Length: 12:38
- Label: Think Music
- Producer: Vishal Chandrashekhar

Vishal Chandrashekhar chronology
Soppana Sundari (2023)	Chithha (2024)	Birthmark (2024)
External audio
- Film Score on YouTube

An album which consists of the film's musical score composed by Vishal Chandrashekhar was released on 15 March 2024 by Think Music, featuring 18 tracks.

Chithha (Original Background Score)
No.	Title	Length
1.	"First Sight"	1:10
2.	"Settai"	1:01
3.	"Bike Ride"	1:03
4.	"Eesu & Shakthi"	1:06
5.	"Settai's Mischief"	1:15
6.	"Hasty Decision"	1:09
7.	"A Distraught from Ponni"	1:04
8.	"Broken Point"	2:01
9.	"Heart Broken"	1:01
10.	"The Predator"	1:51
11.	"Evil Act"	2:08
12.	"Search Is Over"	1:01
13.	"Trauma"	1:07
14.	"Rage for Vengeance"	1:13
15.	"Realization"	1:04
16.	"Fly High"	1:02
17.	"Spark of Love"	1:10
18.	"Kangal Edho Reprise"	1:01
Total length:		22:37

== Personnel ==
Credits adapted from Think Music:

- Dhibu Ninan Thomas – composer (tracks: 1, 2, 3), piano (track: 1), synths (track: 1)
- Santhosh Narayanan – composer (track: 4), recording engineer (Future Tense Studios, Chennai) [track: 4]
- Aravind Srinivas – additional vocals (track: 2)
- Saisharan – additional vocals (track: 2)
- Jithin Raj – additional vocals (track: 2)
- Santhosh Hariharan – additional vocals (track: 2)
- Kalyani Nair – backing vocals (track: 3), strings arrangement (tracks: 1, 2)
- Kapil Kapilan – backing vocals (track: 3)
- Naveen Napier – bass (track: 1)
- Shruthiraj – percussion (track: 1)
- Kamalakar – flute (track: 1)
- Nikhil Ram – flute (track: 2)
- Nadhan – clarinet (track: 1)
- Santhosh Chandran – guitar (track: 3)
- Anupam Roy – violin (track: 4)
- Aditya Ravindran – harmony (track: 4)
- Karthik Vamsi – live rhythm (track: 4)
- Budapest Scoring Orchestra – strings (tracks: 1, 2)
- Peter Illenyi – conductor (tracks: 1, 2)
- Balasubramanian G – orchestra co-ordinator (tracks: 1, 2)
- K. S. Mani Ratnam – recording engineer (The Mystics Room, Chennai) [tracks: 1, 2]
- Avinash Satish – recording engineer (20db Sound Studios, Chennai) [tracks: 1, 2]
- Dennis – recording engineer (Grace Records, Chennai) [tracks: 1, 2, 3]
- Karthik Manickavasakam – recording engineer (Future Tense Studios, Chennai) [track: 4]
- Pranav Muniraj – recording engineer (Future Tense Studios, Chennai) [track: 4]
- Rupendar Venkatesh – recording engineer (Future Tense Studios, Chennai) [track: 4], mixing engineer (track: 4), mastering engineer (track: 4)
- Balu Thankachan – mixing engineer (20db Sound Studios, Chennai) [tracks: 1, 2]
- Kiran Lal – mixing engineer (Grace Records, Chennai) [track: 3]
- Shadab Rayeen – mastering engineer (New Edge Studios, Mumbai) [tracks: 1, 2]
- Jaba Raj – studio assistance (track: 4)
- Meenakshi Santhosh – musicians co-ordinator (track: 4)

== Chart performance ==
Chart	Song	Peak position	Ref.
India (Billboard)	"Unakku Thaan"	18	
Asian Music Chart (OCC)	"Unakku Thaan"	11	
Radio Mirchi (Tamil)	"Unakku Thaan"	1	
Radio Mirchi (Tamil)	"Kangal Edho"	4	

== Accolades ==
Award	Date of ceremony	Category	Recipient(s) and nominee(s)	Result	Ref.
Ananda Vikatan Cinema Awards	22 June 2024	Best Music Director – Songs	Santhosh Narayanan (Note: only nominated for the song "Unakku Thaan"; also for Jigarthanda DoubleX)	Nominated	
Ananda Vikatan Cinema Awards	22 June 2024	Best Music Director – Score	Vishal Chandrashekhar	Nominated	
Ananda Vikatan Cinema Awards	22 June 2024	Best Male Playback Singer	Santhosh Narayanan – ("Unakku Thaan")	Nominated	
Ananda Vikatan Cinema Awards	22 June 2024	Best Female Playback Singer	Karthika Vaidyanathan – ("Kangal Edho")	Nominated	
Ananda Vikatan Cinema Awards	22 June 2024	Best Lyricist	Yugabharathi – ("Kangal Edho") (Note: also for "Nenjame Nenjame" from Maamannan.)	Won	
Ananda Vikatan Cinema Awards	22 June 2024	Best Lyricist	Vivek – ("Unakku Thaan")	Nominated	
Filmfare Awards South	3 August 2024	Best Music Director	Santhosh Narayanan and Dhibu Ninan Thomas	Won	
Filmfare Awards South	3 August 2024	Best Female Playback Singer – Tamil	Karthika Vaidyanathan – ("Kangal Edho")	Won	
South Indian International Movie Awards	14–15 September 2024	Best Music Director – Tamil	Santhosh Narayanan – ("Unakku Thaan")	Pending	
South Indian International Movie Awards	14–15 September 2024	Best Lyricist – Tamil	Vivek – ("Unakku Thaan")	Pending	
South Indian International Movie Awards	14–15 September 2024	Best Female Playback Singer – Tamil	Karthika Vaidyanathan – ("Kangal Edho")	Pending	
