= Daredevil Musthafa =

2023 Indian comedy drama film

- Theatrical release poster
- Directed by: Shashank Soghal
- Written by: Anantha Shandreya; Raghavendra Mayakonda; Shashank Soghal
- Screenplay by: Anantha Shandreya; Shashank Soghal
- Story by: K. P. Poornachandra Tejaswi
- Based on: Daredevil Musthafa by K. P. Poornachandra Tejaswi
- Produced by: 100+ Tejaswi fans
- Starring: Shishir Baikady; Aditya Ashree; Supreeth Bharadwaj
- Cinematography: Rahul Roy
- Edited by: Rahul Roy; Sharath Vashisht; Harish Komme
- Music by: Navaneeth Sham
- Production company: Cinemamara
- Distributed by: KRG Studios
- Release date: 19 May 2023
- Running time: 160 minutes
- Country: India
- Language: Kannada
- Budget: ₹1.25 crores
- Box office: ₹1.75 crores

Daredevil Musthafa Mattu Ramanuja Iyengari Patalam is a 2023 Indian Kannada-language comedy-drama film directed by debutant Shashank Soghal. The film is based on Poornachandra Tejaswi's short story of the same name from Abachoorina Post Office. It was produced by more than 100 fans of writer Tejaswi. The film stars an ensemble cast of Shishir Baikady, Aditya Ashree, Abhay, Supreeth Bharadwaj, Aashith, Srivatsa, Prerana, M. S. Umesh, Mandya Ramesh, Mysore Anand, Sunder Veena, Harini Srikanth, Nagabhushana, Poornachandra Mysuru, Vijay Shobhraj, Chaithra Shetty, Karthik Pattar, Krishnegowda and Mahadeva Prasad.

== Plot ==
The goal of Ramanuja Iyengari and his gang is to expel Musthafa from the college. After a series of entertaining escapades, everyone's fate will be decided in a thrilling cricket match.

== Cast ==
- Shishir Baikady as Jamal Abdul Musthafa Hussain
- Aditya Ashree as Ramanuja Iyengari
- Abhay as Shankara Shetty
- Supreeth Bharadwaj as Pulikeshi
- Aashith as Kumara
- Srivatsa as Sheena
- Prerana as Ramamani
- M. S. Umesh as Rangadhamaiah (History Lecturer)
- Mandya Ramesh as Principal Seebayya
- Poornachandra Mysore as Sulthankeri Usman
- Nagabhushana as Sarpabhushana (Kannada Lecturer)
- Vijay Shobhraj Pavoor as Kusumakar (PT Master)
- Mysore Anand as Peon Aadinarayana
- Sunder Veena as Ramanuja's Father
- Harini Srikanth as Ramanuja's Mother
- Chaithra Shetty as Olivia Shoba Kumari (O.S.K.) (English Lecturer)
- Karthik Pattar as Dammanagi (Logic / Economics Lecturer)
- Krishnegowda
- Mahadeva Prasad as Police constable
- Apeksha as Pushpabharathi (Ramamani's friend)
- Niharika as Manjula (Ramamani's friend)
- Anantha Shandreya as B.K.Shi (Economics Lecturer)
- Vijay Kumar Soghal as Police constable

== Production ==
When Shashank Soghal, a short film maker who was inspired by Poornachandra Tejaswi's short story, couldn't find producers for his intended directorial debut with the story Daredevil Musthafa, he turned to crowdfunding to raise the money. Both Aditya Ashree and Shishir Baikady, who come from theater backgrounds, reduced their weight to fit their characters as college students. The film was shot at Hardwick High School and College, while some scenes were shot in Melukote and Madikeri. The filming was completed within sixty days. The cinematography of the film was done by Rahul Roy and the editing of the film was done by Rahul Roy, Sharath Vashisht and Harish Komme. The trailer for the film was released on 4 May 2023.

== Music ==
The music of the film was composed by Navaneeth Sham and released under PRK audio label.

Track listing
No.	Title	Lyrics	Singer(s)	Length
1.	"Ninnanthor Yaaru Ilvallo (epic)"	C. Veeranna	Vasuki Vaibhav	3:55
2.	"Aagodide Aarambhavu"	Sampath Sirimane, Shashank Soghal	Siddhartha Belmannu	4:38
3.	"Prarambha Payana"	Sampath Sirimane	Sunidhi Ganesh, Varun Ramachandra	2:12
4.	"Jayamala Damayanthi Yarappa"	Shashank Soghal	Aditya Ashree, Aashith, Abhay	3:35
5.	"Lo Lo Lo"	—	—	0:29
6.	"Naan Bidi Daredevil"	—	—	0:42
7.	"Daali Daredevil"	—	—	1:00
8.	"Trailer Theme"	—	—	3:36
Total length:				20:07

== Release ==
The film was theatrically released on 19 May 2023. It ran for over 50 days in few theatres across the state.

=== Home media ===
Online streaming rights to the film were acquired by Amazon Prime Video.

== Reception ==
Siddaramaiah, the chief minister of Karnataka, has granted tax exemption for the film and posted a message on social media congratulating the cast and crew for all of their work. Marking the one year anniversary of the film, the director released the screenplay of the film in form of book.

=== Critical reception ===
The film received positive reviews from critics and audience.

Harish Basavarajaiah of The Times of India gave it 4 out of 5 stars and wrote, "Daredevil is one of the best literary adaptations in Sandalwood in recent times and will surely be remembered as a classic in the years to come." Latha Srinivasan of India Today gave it 3.5 out of 5 stars and wrote, "It is a contemporary classic because it is an entertaining college drama with a religious twist."

Vivek M. V. of The Hindu wrote, "an entertaining college drama that does justice to Poornachandra Tejaswi’s famous short story" Subha J. Rao of The News Minute gave it 4 out of 5 stars noting its "a wholesome, precious watch in today’s world filled with division and hate."

Prathibha Joy of OTTplay gave it 4 out of 5 stars and wrote, "Daredevil Musthafa was a pleasant and heart-warming surprise, although, at two hours and 40 minutes, Shashank’s adaptation of the short story felt a tad too long drawn out." A. Sharadhaa of Cinema Express gave it 3.5 out of 5 stars and wrote, "Daredevil Musthafa promotes communal harmony is a treat to watch." Shashiprasad S. M. of The South First gave the film 4 out of 5 stars noting its "a must-see even if you haven’t read Tejaswi’s work and more so if you have!"

== Accolades ==
Award	Category	Recipient	Result	Ref
69th Filmfare Awards South	Best Film	Tejaswi Fans Association	Won	
69th Filmfare Awards South	Best Director	Shashank Soghal	Nominated	
69th Filmfare Awards South	Best Actor	Shishir Baikady	Nominated	
69th Filmfare Awards South	Best Male Debut	Shishir Baikady	Won	
69th Filmfare Awards South	Best Supporting Actor	Poornachandra Mysuru	Nominated	
