= Santhosham (2023 film) =

2023 Malayalam film

- Theatrical release poster
- Directed by: Ajith V Thomas
- Produced by: Isha Pattali; Ajith V Thomas
- Starring: Anu Sithara; Amith Chakalakkal; Kalabhavan Shajohn; Mallika Sukumaran
- Cinematography: Karthik A
- Edited by: Johnkutty
- Music by: P S Jayhari
- Production company: Mise-En-Scene Entertainment
- Release date: 24 February 2023
- Country: India
- Language: Malayalam

Santhosham (transl. Happiness) is a 2023 Indian Malayalam-language film directed by Ajith V Thomas and produced by Isha Pattali and Ajith V Thomas under the banner Mise-En-Scene Entertainment. It features Anu Sithara, Amith Chakalakkal, Kalabhavan Shajohn, and Mallika Sukumaran. It was released on 24 February 2023.

== Cast ==
- Anu Sithara as Aadhya Suresh Kumar
- Amith Chakalakkal as Gireesh Periperuli
- Kalabhavan Shajohn as Suresh Kumar
- Mallika Sukumaran as Leelammachi
- Asha Aravind as Sindhu Suresh
- Lakshmi as Akshara Suresh Kumar
- Aaryan as Aryan
- Thanmayi as Arfan
- Aavani as Jasmine
- Isha Pattali as Aleena Teacher
- Disney James as Roy
- Sabeetta George as Gireesh's mother
- Babitha Basheer as Gireesh's sister
- Arjun Sathyan as Sulaiju
- John Alukka as himself
- Akshara as Aadya's friend

== Production ==
The production team unveil song track from film "Shwasame" which is composed by P S Jayhari. Later, Nivin Pauly released the trailer on 15 February 2023.

== Reception ==
A critic from Mathrubhumi wrote that "The audience will see the quirks and talk of the youngest child in the house, but with a way of speaking with knowledge beyond his years". A critic from ManoramaOnline gave a mixed review.
