= Jawanum Mullapoovum =

2023 Indian Malayalam-language film

Jawanum mullapoovam
- Theatrical release poster
- Directed by: Raghu Menon
- Written by: Suresh Krishnan
- Screenplay by: Suresh Krishnan
- Produced by: Sameer Sait; Vinod Unnithan
- Starring: Sshivada; Sumesh Chandran; Rahul Madhav; Sini Abraham; Devi Ajith
- Cinematography: Shyal Satheesh
- Edited by: Sanal Anirudhan
- Music by: 4 Musics; Mathai Sunil
- Production company: 2 Creative Minds
- Release date: 31 March 2023
- Running time: 118 minutes
- Country: India
- Language: Malayalam

Jawanum Mullappoovum is a 2023 Indian Malayalam-language film, directed by debutant Raghu Menon, starring Sshivada, Sumesh Chandran and Rahul Madhav in lead roles.

== Synopsis ==
Jawanum Mullappoovum is the story of Jayasree Teacher and the circumstances showing how life becomes difficult for the common people without any sufficient knowledge in technology during the time of pandemic.

== Cast ==
- Sshivada as Jayasree Teacher
- Sumesh Chandran as Giridhar / Jawan
- Rahul Madhav as Sajan Peter, IT Professional
- Sini Abraham as Mercy
- Ambily as Fathima
- Vinod Unnithan as Ichayan
- Balaji Sarma as Sub Inspector Solomon
- Devi Ajith as Head Mistress
- Vinod Kedamangalam as Babukuttan
- Harisree Martin as Hussain
- Baby Sadhika Menon as Diya, Jayasree's daughter
- Sandeep Padmanabhan as Shamsu mash
- Kavitha Raghunandan Rema Teacher
- Cobra Rajesh as John Mash
- Bala Shankar as Junior Jayanthan
- Sabu as Bhagavather

== Reception ==
Flickonclick critic gave 4 stars out of 5 and stated that "The family entertainer starts off on a positive note and as viewers start to get comfortable with a feel-good story they are thrust into an environment that has a lot of intrigue and suspense. The movie progresses quite naturally and you won’t feel that the storyline is forced at any moment"
