= Orchestra Mysuru =

Indian Kannada-language musical drama film

- Release poster
- Directed by: Sunil Mysuru
- Screenplay by: Poornachandra Mysore; Joseph K. Raja; Mahadeva Prasad
- Story by: Sunil; Naveen Sajju
- Produced by: Ashwin Vijaykumar; Raghu Dixit
- Starring: Poornachandra Mysore; Rajalakshmi Murthy; Dileep Raj
- Cinematography: Joseph K Raja; Rahul Roy
- Edited by: Joseph K Raja
- Music by: Raghu Dixit
- Production companies: Ashwin Creations; Raghu Dixit Productions
- Distributed by: Daali Pictures; KRG Studios
- Release date: 12 January 2023
- Running time: 174 minutes
- Country: India
- Language: Kannada

Orchestra Mysuru (transl. Mysore orchestra) is a 2023 Indian Kannada-language musical drama film directed by Sunil Mysuru and starring Poornachandra Mysore, Rajalakshmi Murthy, and Dileep Raj. The music was composed by Raghu Dixit.

== Cast ==
- Poornachandra Mysore as Poorna
- Rajalakshmi Murthy as Shilpa
- Dileep Raj as Naveen Raju
- KJ Sachu
- Rajesh Basavanna
- Lingaraju
- Mahadeva
- Mahesh Kumar as Poorna's best friend
- Ravi Hunsur
- Dhananjaya as a shepard (cameo appearance)
- Raghu Dixit (cameo appearance)

== Production ==
The film began production under the title Orchestra in 2017.

== Soundtrack ==
The music was composed by Raghu Dixit.

All lyrics are written by Dhananjaya.

Track listing
| No. | Title | Singer(s) | Length |
|---|---|---|---|
| 1. | "Maadappa" | Naveen Sajju | 3:58 |
| 2. | "Sangeeta Sagara" | Benny Dayal, Siddhartha Belmannu | 5:08 |
| 3. | "Sulla Chandira" | Raghu Dixit | 4:20 |
| 4. | "Nadiyondu" | Siddhartha Belmannu | 4:26 |
| 5. | "Arey Arey" | Varun Ramachandra | 3:30 |
| 6. | "Idu Yeno Ondthara" | Siddhartha Belmannu | 4:56 |
| 7. | "Dum Idre Hodi Nanna" | Raghu Dixit | 3:23 |
| 8. | "Haaduve Naa Haaduve" | Siddhartha Belmannu | 6:52 |
| Total length: | | | 36:33 |

== Reception ==
A critic from Deccan Herald wrote that "'Orchestra Mysuru' is billed as 'Sankrantige ge ondu Kannada cinema' (A Kannada film on Sankranti). To the team's credit, the film is definitely watchable, compared to the other forgettable big festival releases. But the bigger victory for the makers will be when people show curiosity toward worthy films like these without stars". A critic from The New Indian Express wrote that "Orchestra Mysuru is a heartfelt teamwork by Mysoreans and for Mysoreans. A feel-good piece of work, which has music as its backdrop creates a world that touches upon dreams and hard work". A critic from The News Minute wrote that "There are several endearing moments in Orchestra, Mysuru! but most of them are left half-explored. Still, the film works to a good extent because it remains simple and self-aware throughout and most times, that's likely to suffice".

A critic from The Times of India wrote that "Overall, it is a fresh attempt by a new team and can be enjoyed in theatres". A critic from Bangalore Mirror wrote that "Director Sunil Mysuru must be appreciated for keeping the focus on the story. However, the running time (174 minutes) plays spoilsport as it can test audiences’ patience". A critic from OTT play wrote that "Unlike most other films, Orchestra, Mysuru! knows where its heart lies and that's a huge deal when it comes to a film".
