= Sathyan Sooryan =

Indian cinematographer

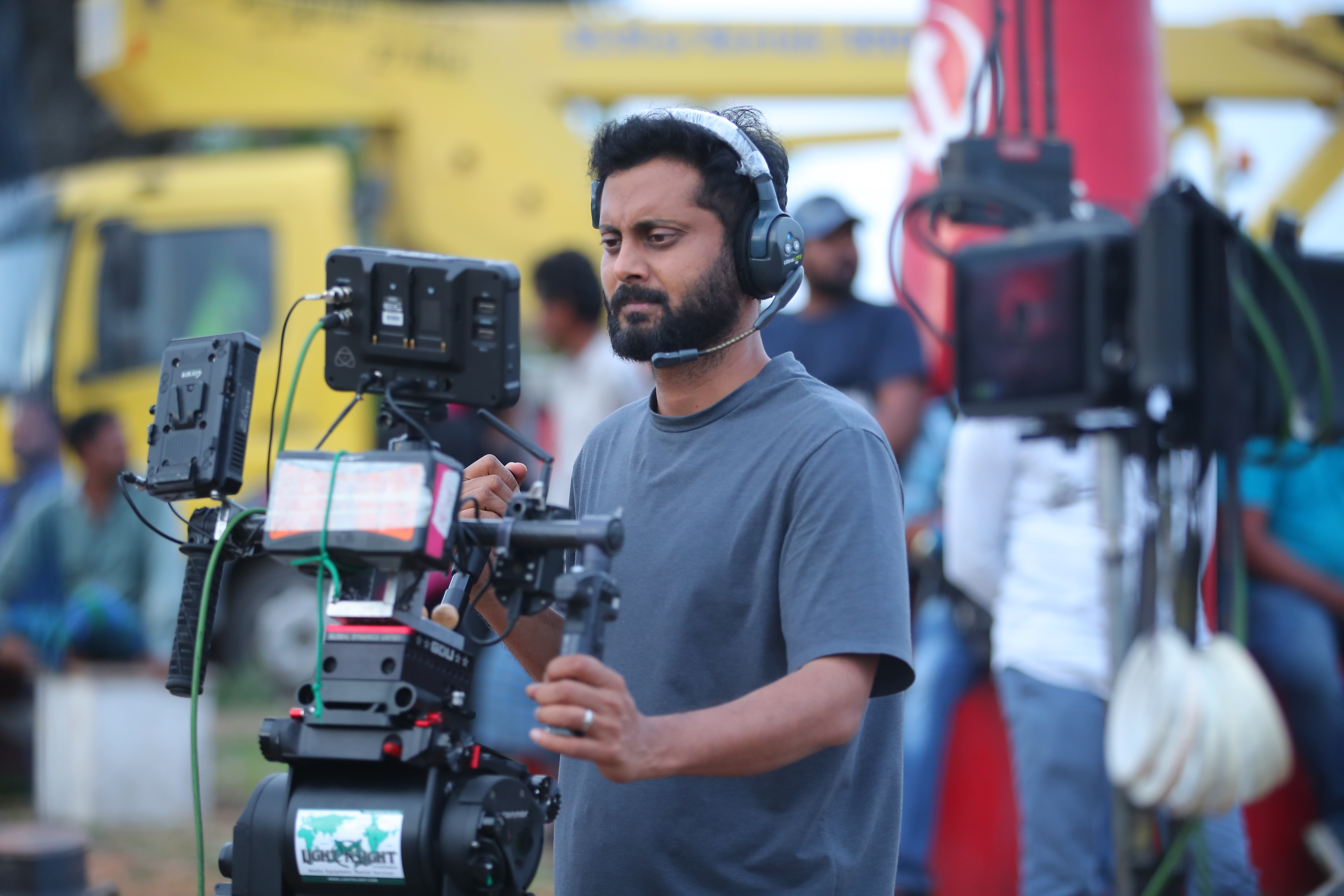
- Born: Tittakudi, Tamil Nadu, India
- Occupation: Cinematographer
- Years active: 2011–present
- Spouse: Hamsa

Sathyan Sooryan is an Indian cinematographer who predominantly works in Tamil and Telugu films. He is an alumnus of the College of Fine Arts, Chennai. He has won the Filmfare Award for Best Cinematographer – South for his work in Dasara (2023).

== Career ==
Sooryan was also an assistant to P. C. Sreeram. He made his debut with Yuddham Sei (2011). In a review of the film by The Hindu, a critic noted that "Cinematographer Sathya's contribution is crucial — his lens and lighting accentuate the suspense and eeriness of the drama". His work in the movie Maya was critically acclaimed. Cinematography in the film Theeran Adhigaaram Ondru was lauded by critics. In a review of the film by The Times of India, the reviewer wrote that "cinematographer Sathyan Sooryan's wide frames, which turn the sun-burnt, unforgiving terrain into a parallel antagonist, make it a film that needs to be savoured on the big screen". In 2019, he worked for the film Kaithi. His work in the film was well appreciated. He made his Telugu debut with the biographical film Yatra. His work in the Telugu film Dasara (2023) was praised well. He joined in the film's production in 2021. In an interview with The Hindu's Sangeetha Devi Dundoo, Sooryan told that "the challenge was to film the day-to-day portions. We had to film some of the sunny portions on monsoon days when the sky was overcast. More than 200 junior artists were involved in some scenes and we could not sit idle and wait for the sun".

== Filmography ==
Year	Film	Language	Notes
2011	Yuddham Sei	Tamil	
2012	Mugamoodi	Tamil	
2014	100 Degree Celsius	Malayalam	
2015	Maya	Tamil	
2017	Sangili Bungili Kadhava Thorae	Tamil	
2017	Theeran Adhigaaram Ondru	Tamil	
2018	Adanga Maru	Tamil	
2019	Yatra	Telugu	
2019	Kaithi	Tamil	
2021	Master	Tamil	
2021	Sulthan	Tamil	
2022	Vikram	Tamil	Title Announcement Video only
2022	Ramarao on Duty	Telugu	
2023	Dasara	Telugu	Filmfare Award for Best Cinematographer – Telugu
2023	Annapoorani: The Goddess of Food	Tamil	
2026	Love Insurance Kompany	Tamil	
2026	Jana Nayagan	Tamil	
