= Poornachandra Mysore =

Indian Kannada theatre and film actor

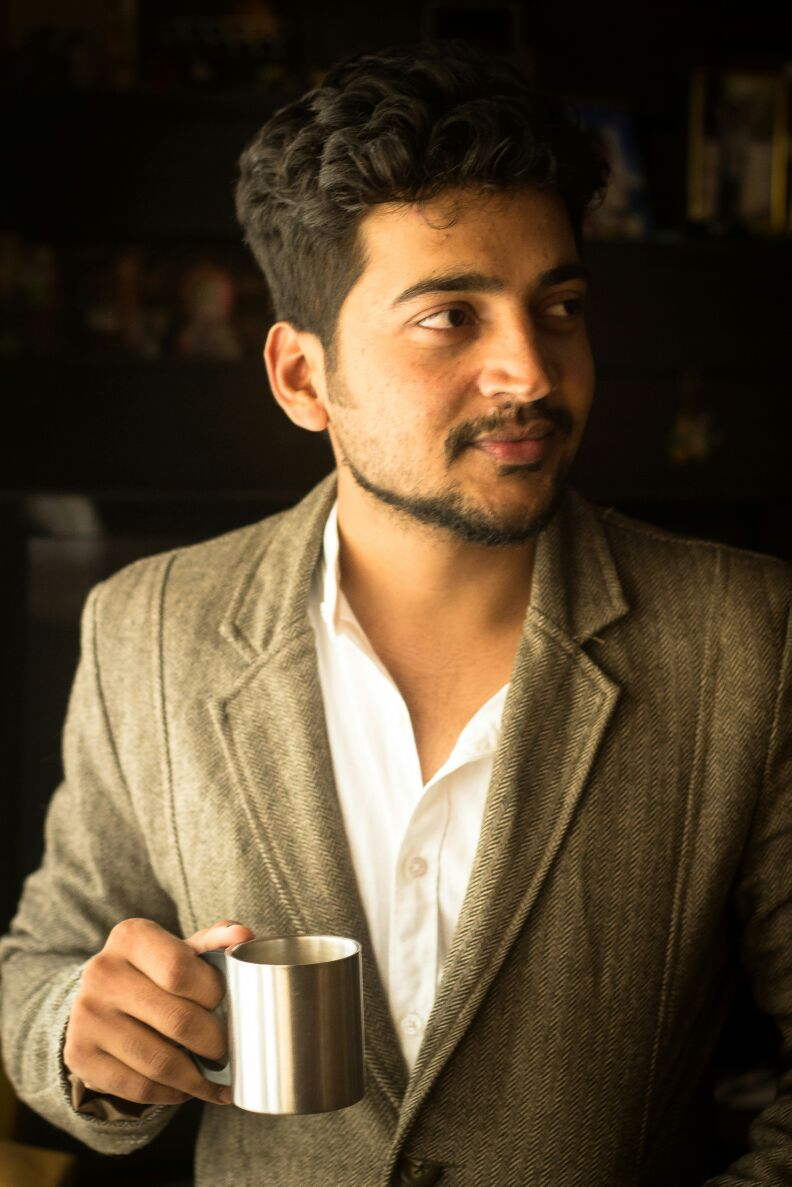
- Occupation: Actor
- Years active: 2013-present

Poornachandra Mysore (born 3 March 1988) is an Indian actor known for his work in Kannada cinema and theatre.

== Career ==
Poornachandra Mysore started his career with a minor role in Lucia (2013) before getting noticed for the short film Patinga (2015). He later went on to play supporting roles in several films and lead roles in films such as BB5 (2017), Tagaru (2018), Popcorn Monkey Tiger (2020), Badava Rascal (2021), Orchestra Mysuru (2023) and Daredevil Musthafa (2023). Regarding his performance in Orchestra Mysore, a critic wrote that "Poornachandra is convincing as an aspirational than a happy-go-lucky youngster".

== Filmography ==
=== Films ===
| Year | Film | Role | Notes |
|---|---|---|---|
| 2013 | Lucia | Drug peddler | |
| 2015 | Patinga | | Short film Won—SIIMA Short Film Award for Best Actor |
| 2017 | BB5 | Desai | |
| 2017 | Dayavittu Gamanisi | | |
| 2018 | Tagaru | Jamoon Ravi | |
| 2018 | Nathicharami | Mahesh | |
| 2020 | Popcorn Monkey Tiger | Bablu | |
| 2021 | Badava Rascal | Ganapa | |
| 2022 | Twenty One Hours | | |
| 2023 | Orchestra Mysuru | Poorna | Also screenplay writer Won—Filmfare Critics Award for Best Actor – Kannada |
| 2023 | Shivaji Surathkal 2 | Professor Rudra / Dr. Pratap | |
| 2023 | Daredevil Musthafa | Sulthankeri Usman | |
| 2023 | Tagaru Palya | Husband | Special appearance |
| 2023 | Bad Manners | Gunnis | |
| 2024 | Matinee | Anand | |
| 2024 | Family Drama | Praksha | |
| 2024 | Maryade Prashne | Manja | |
| 2025 | Ekka | Daddy | |
| 2026 | Mother Promise | Ryandi | Also director |

=== Theatre ===
| Year | Title | Role | Ref. |
|---|---|---|---|
| 2018 | "Parshwasangeeta" | Poornachandra Shama | |
