= P S Jayhari =

Indian music composer

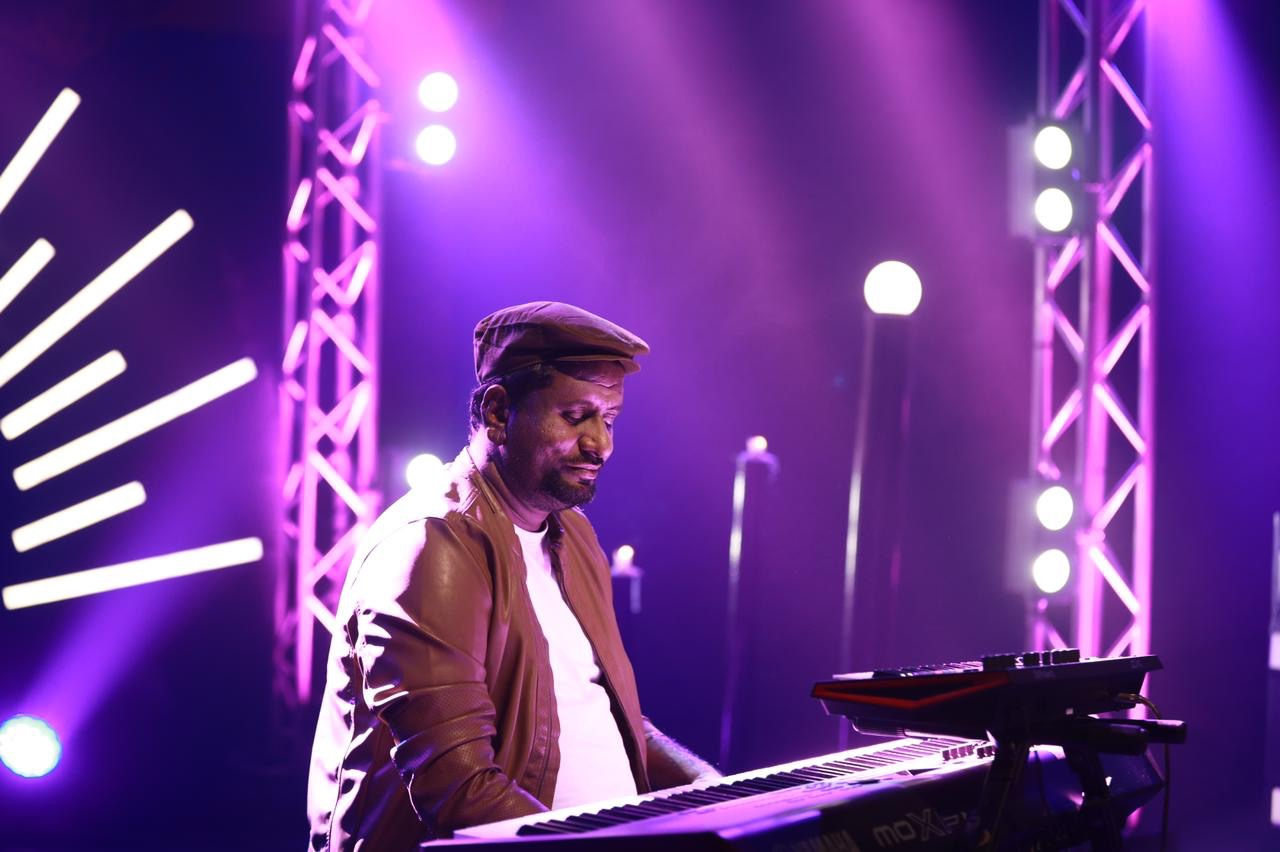
- Born: Kochi, Kerala, India
- Occupation: Music Composer
- Years active: 2018–present
- Known for: Athiran, Jeem Boom Bhaa, Kadakalam etc.

P S Jayhari is an Indian music composer who predominantly work in Malayalam Movie Industry. He is known for composing songs for the movies Athiran, Pidikittapulli, 18 Hours, Kadakalam, Kochal etc. He is also known for scoring the documentary Chembai: My Discovery of a Legend which got special mention in National Film Awards in 2017.

== Discography ==
Year	Title	Notes and Ref.
2019	Athiran	
2019	Jeem Boom Bhaa	
2021	Pidikittapulli	
2021	18 Hours	
2021	Kadakalam	Kerala State award-winning Movie
2022	Kochal	
2022	Sanjay On Call	
2023	Santhosham	
2023	Imbam	
2025	Mr & Mrs Bachelor	

== Awards and recognition ==
Year	Award	Category	Film	Result
2020	Vanitha Film Award	Best Music Director	Athiran	Won
2019	Red FM Film Award	Best Debut Music Director	Athiran	Won
2020	Mirchi Music Award	Best Debut Music Director	Athiran	Won
