= Sonu Nigam discography =

Discography of Indian playback singer Sonu Nigam

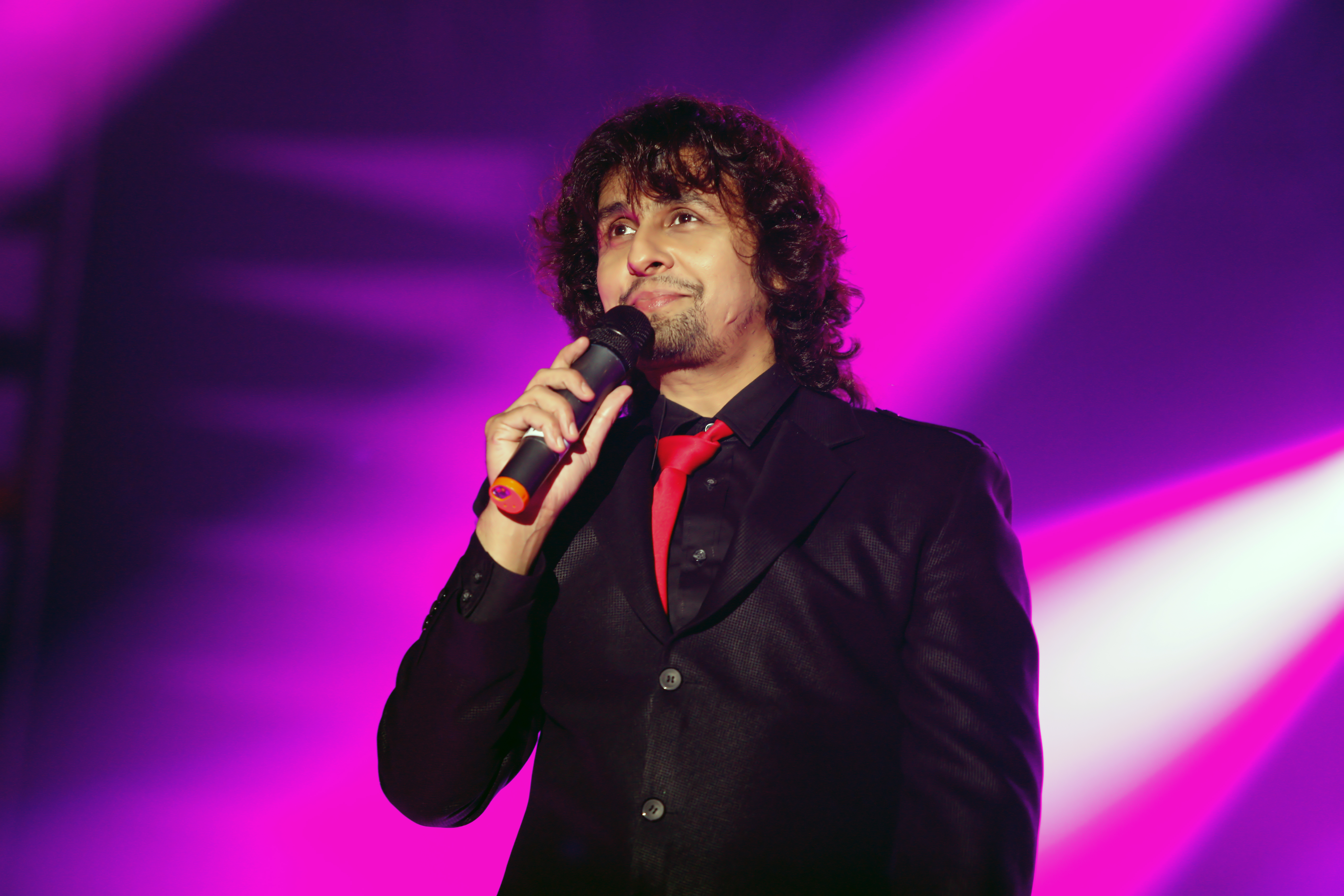
Nigam performing at the 'Tri Nation Mega Concert' in 2012

Indian playback singer Sonu Nigam has recorded numerous albums and songs. He has also released several devotional albums including Maha Ganesha (2008). He sang for several Ambedkarite and Buddhist albums including Buddha Hi Buddha Hai (2010) and Siddhartha-The Lotus Blossom (2013). He covered the songs of famous Ghazal singer Pankaj Udhas in Best of Pankaj Udhas.

== Albums ==
Title	Details
Bewafa Sanam - Vol 1	Released: January 1993; Label: T-Series; Formats: CD, Cassette
Bewafa Sanam - Vol 2	Released: January 1993; Label: T-Series; Formats: CD, Cassette
Bewafa Sanam - Vol 3	Released: January 1993; Label: T-Series; Formats: CD, Cassette
Bewafa Sanam - Vol 4	Released: January 1994; Label: T-Series; Formats: CD, Cassette
Bewafa Sanam - Vol 5	Released: March 1994; Label: T-Series; Formats: CD, Cassette
Aeka Thaka Chilo Bhalo	Released: January 1995; Label: T-Series; Formats: CD, Cassette; Language: Bengali
Bewafa Sanam - Vol 6	Released: February 1995; Label T-Series; Formats: CD, Cassette
Sundari	Released: June 1995; Label: Saregama; Formats: CD, Cassette; Language: Bengali
Tomaar Aupekkhaaye	Released: August 1996; Label: Ishtar Music; Formats: CD, Cassette; Language: Bengali
Bewafa Sanam - Vol 7	Released: March 1997; Label T-Series; Formats: CD, Cassette
Sapne Ki Baat	Released: August 1997; Label: T-Series; Formats: CD, cassette, digital download
Afsana	Released: October 1997; Label T-Series; Formats: CD, Cassette
Kismat	Released: March 1998; Label: Magnasound; Formats: CD, cassette
Sapunor Kuwoli	Released: September 1998; Label: Raj Music; Formats: Cassette
Sanskar	Released: November 1998; Label: Magnasound; Formats: CD, Cassette, digital download
Madhuri '99	Released: January 1999; Label: Regional Music Centre; Format: Cassette
Deewana	Released: February 1999; Label: T-Series; Formats: CD, cassette, digital download
Mausam	Released: July 1999; Label: Magnasound; Formats: CD, cassette
Pariyon Se	Released: September 1999; Label: Merica; Formats: CD, cassette
Jaan	Released: February 2000; Label: T-Series; Formats: CD, cassette
Dil 2 Dil	Released: March 2000; Label: Magnasound; Formats: CD, cassette
Basrai Golap	Released: September 2000; Label: Ishtar Music; Formats: CD, Cassette; Language: Bengali
Yaad	Released: February 2001; Label: T-Series; Formats: CD, cassette, digital download
Sandhiya Parat	Released: March 2002; Label: Auditek Music; Formats: CD, cassette
Aanchal	Released: May 2002; Label: SC Records; Formats: CD, cassette
Dokhol	Released: June 2002; Label: SC Records; Formats: CD, cassette
Chanda Ki Doli	Released: June 2005; Label: T-Series; Formats: CD, cassette, digital download
Tomar Shopno Niye Bachbo	Released: January 2008; Label: Sangeeta Music; Formats: CD, Cassette; Language: Bengali
Notun Kore Bhalobashbo	Released: January 2008; Label: Sangeeta Music; Formats: CD, Cassette; Language: Bengali
Classically Mild	Released: November 2008; Label: Saregama; Formats: CD, cassette
Maha Ganesha	Released: 13 August 2008; Label: Times Music; Formats: CD
Rafi Resurrected	Released: September 2008; Label: Saregama; Formats: CD
Time Travel - Journey 1	Released: 31 July 2009; Label: Saregama; Formats: CD
Fele Asha Bhalobasha	Released: January 2010; Label: Sangeeta Music; Formats: CD, Cassette; Language: Bengali
Yeh Naya Naya	Released: March 2010; Label: T-Series; Formats: CD, Cassette; Language: Hindi
Icchapurti - Gayatri Mantra	Released: 2011; Label: I Believe Music; Formats: CD, digital download
The Music Room	Released: 16 December 2014; Label: Times Music; Formats: CD, digital download

== Singles ==
Year	Song	Language	Composer(s)	Lyricist(s)	Co-Artist(s)	Notes
2006	Yeh Rashtra Prem Ki Bhavna	Hindi			Shaan, KK, Shankar Mahadevan, Kunal Ganjawala, Hariharan, Udit Narayan, Kumar Sanu, Abhijeet Bhattacharya, Kailash Kher, Himesh Reshammiya, Sukhwinder Singh, Vinod Rathod, Roop Kumar Rathod, A. R. Rahman, Karthik	
2006	Haath Se Haath Mila	Hindi			Shreya Ghoshal	HIV Awareness Special
2008	Punjabi Please	Punjabi				
2010	Phir Mile Sur Mera Tumhar	Hindi			Gurdas Maan, Shaan, Kavita Krishnamurthy, K. J. Yesudas, Vijay Yesudas, Shreya Ghoshal	National Integration song of India
2012	Indian Levels	Hindi			Avicii	
2012	Salaami Ho Jaye	Hindi			Shankar Mahadevan, Sunidhi Chauhan, Mohit Chauhan, Shaan, Kailash Kher and Zanai Bhosle	Anti-Piracy song, which salutes the creative fraternity and gives them their due respect
2013	Betiyaan (Save the Girl Child)	Hindi			Shankar Mahadevan, Sunidhi Chauhan, Sonu Nigam	
2015	Aa Bhi Ja Tu Kahin Se	Hindi				
2016	Crazy Dil	Hindi				
2016	First Date	Hindi			Jonita Gandhi	
2016	Sab Rab De Bande	Hindi			6 Pack Band	
2017	Aye Jahaan Aasmaan	Hindi			Shreya Ghoshal	
2017	Sachin's Cricket Wali Beat	Hindi			Sachin Tendulkar	
2018	Aye Zindagi	Hindi				
2018	Totta	Hindi and Punjabi			Meet Bros	
2018	Tik Tik Plastic	Hindi			Shaan, Shiamak Davar, Sonu Nigam, Sunidhi Chauhan, Ayushmann Khurana, Kanika Kapoor, Shankar Mahadevan, Armaan Malik, Shekhar Ravjiani and Neeti Mohan, Arijit Singh, Kunal Ganjawala, K. K, Shaan, Kailash Kher, Jubin Nautiyal, Yo Yo Honey Singh, Hariharan, Sukhwinder Singh, Kumar Sanu, Udit Narayan, Abhijeet Bhattacharya	
2018	Mumbai River Anthem	Hindi			Amruta Fadnavis	
2018	Chaahaton Ke Saaye Mein	Hindi				
2018	OMT	Hindi & English			Shannon K	
2019	Shiv Shankara	Hindi				
2019	Bam Bhole Bam	Hindi				
2019	Kahan Kho Gaye Wo Yaar	Hindi				
2020	Ishq Hua Re	Marathi			Bela Shende	
2020	Rudrashtakam	Sanskrit				
2020	Jo Tune Likha	Hindi				
2020	"Lokmat SurJyotsna" (Title Track)	Hindi			Alka Yagnik	
2020	Neene Neene	Kannada			Sangeetha Rajeev	
2020	Tum Ho Kahan	Hindi			Kavita Krishnamurti	From album "Hum Dono"
2020	"Jayatu Jayatu Bharatam"	Hindi			Along with 210 other Indian Artists	
2020	Simran (Ik Onkaar)	Punjabi			Suresh Wadkar, Jaswinder Singh	
2020	Ishwar Ka Vo Sacha Banda	Hindi			Anuradha Paudwal, Anuradha Sriram, Lata Mangeshkar, Asha Bhosle, Hemalatha, Poornima, Alisha Chinai, Sunidhi Chauhan, Shreya Ghoshal, Kavitha Krishnamurty	
2020	Elo Maa Dugga Thakur	Bengali			Monali Thakur, Jeet Ganguly	
2020	Earth Song	Hindi			L. Subramaniam, Kavita Krishnamurti	
2020	MAA	Hindi			Raju Singh	
2020	Doori Me Bhi Hum Paas Hai	Hindi			Shreya Ghoshal	
2021	Yoga for Wellness	Hindi			Kailash Kher, Shankar Mahadevan, Shaan, K. S. Chithra, Daler Mehndi	
2021	Hindustan Ki Shaan (Mankind Pharma)	Hindi				
2021	Hum Hindustani	Hindi			Anusha, Udit Narayan, Priyanka Chopra, Sonakshi, Arijit Singh, K. S. Chitra, S. Janaki, Alka Yagnik, Shruthi Hasan, Kanika Kapoor, Sujatha Mohan, Latha Mangeshkar, Asha Bhosle, Anuradha Paudwal, Anuradha Sriram, Kavitha Krishnamurty, Ila Arun, Shwetha Mohan, Arijit Singh, Shankar Mahadevan, K. J. Yesudas, Karthik, A. R. Rahman, Kunal Ganjawala, Shaan, Supriya, Sukhwinder Singh, K. K., Udit Narayan, Kumar Sanu, Himesh Reshammiya, Srinivas, Blezz, Vijay Prakash, Hariharan, Anu Malik, Vinod Rathod, Roop Kumar, Lucky Ali, Mohith Chahal, Zubeen Garg	
2021	MERI KAHAANI	Hindi				
2021	Baadh	Hindi				This song was performed in Unacademy Unwind With MTV
2021	Sheher	Hindi				This song was performed in Unacademy Unwind With MTV
2021	Badi Nazuk	Hindi				Recreation of Badi Nazuk by Jagjit Singh
2021	Dholoida	Hindi & Gujarati			Arunita Kanjilal	Navaratri Song
2021	Om Jai Lakshmi Mata Aarti	Hindi			Amruta Fadnavis	
2021	Sonn Pann	Hindi			Harshdeep Kaur	
2021	Jai Chhathi Maiya	Bhojpuri			Pawan Singh, Khushboo Jain	Chhath Puja song
2021	Karde Karam O Devi Maa	Hindi			Anup Jalota, Suresh Wadkar, Anuradha Paudwal, Shankar Mahadevan, Kailash Kher, Shaan, Pawan Singh and Shreyas Puranik	
2021	Baat Saaf Hai	Hindi				
2021	Har Dhadkan Hai Swachh Bharat ki	Hindi			Shreya Ghoshal	Composed by Shantanu Moitra
2022	Rangrezwa	Hindi	Meghdeep Bose	Manoj Yadav		
2022	Maula Re	Hindi				
2022	Pyaara Jammu Kashmir	Hindi				
2022	Radha Khelain Hori	Hindi			Hema Malini	
2022	Maher	Hindi				
2022	Mahanubhaava Neenayya	Kannada			Kailash Kher, Vijay Prakash, Shankar Mahadevan	Tribute to actor Puneeth Rajkumar
2022	Dhunde Naina	Hindi			Padma Wadkar	The song is from the album "Morey Piya" by Padma Wadkar which was released in 2015
2022	Nahi Mila Mujhe Pyaar Toh Kya	Hindi			Shaan	CRED bounty Hits Vol. 1
2022	Jeena Abhi Baaki Hain	Hindi			Yajat Garg and Rudra Sharma	Produce by Imtiaz Ali
2022	Jeevan Hai Kya	Hindi			Kavita Krishnamurti	From album "Hum Dono"
2022	Tum Ho Kahan	Hindi			Kavita Krishnamurti	From album "Hum Dono"
2022	Dil Tod Ke	Hindi				Composed by Shabab Sabri
2022	Baap Baap Hota Hai	Hindi				Composed by Sanchit Choudhary Released on Occasion of Father's Day
2022	Yaad	Hindi				Roposo Jamroom Composed by Mukund Suryawanshi
2022	Har Ghar Tiranga	Many Indian Languages			Asha Bhosle, Arko Pravo Mukherjee, Amitabh Bachchan, Prabhas, Virat Kohli	Independence Day Song
2022	Shiksha Na Ruke Anthem	Hindi				Smile Foundation
2022	Na Jaana Kahin Door	Hindi				
2022	Ruk Ja	Hindi	Salim–Sulaiman	Shraddha Pandit		Song from Bhoomi 2022
2023	Hanuman Chalisa	Awadhi, Sanskrit	Traditional	Traditional		
2023	Mahamrityunjaya Mantra	Sanskrit	Traditional	Traditional		
2023	Jai Shree Mahakal	Sanskrit, Hindi	Kailash Kher	Kailash Kher		Kailash Kher, Shankar Mahadevan, Shaan, Arijit Singh
2023	Maa Mera Haath Pakadti Hai	Sanskrit, Hindi	Sonu Nigam	Prabudha Saurabh		
2023	Shri Ram Dhun	Sanskrit, Hindi	Sonu Nigam	Sonu Nigam		
2023	Tomay Gaan Shonabo	Bengali				Composer & Lyricist: Rabindranath Tagore
2023	Mahadeva	Hindi, Sanskrit	Shreyas Puranik	Saveri Verma		
2023	Mera Sumiran Sai	Hindi, Sanskrit	Mayuresh Satish Pai	Chandrashekhar Sanekar		
2023	Gayatri Mantra	Sanskrit				Composer & Lyricist: Traditional
2023	Om Namah Shivay	Sanskrit			Composer: Sonu Nigam, Lyricist: Traditional	Nonstop ShivDhun 108 Times
2023	Teri Yaade	Hindi	Lalit Sen	Dax Patel		
2023	Tera Pyaar Jine	Hindi	Lalit Sen	Dax Patel		
2023	Boondein Marham Si	Hindi				Composer: Meet Bros, Lyricist: Kumaar
2023	Shri Krishna Govind	Hindi, Sanskrit				Composer: Alap Desai, Lyricist: Sant Bilvamangal Acharyaji
2023	O Govinda	Hindi, Sanskrit				Composer: Sushant-Shankar, Lyricist: Saaveri Verma
2023	Bitter Betrayals	Hindi			Composer: Aditya Dev, Nikhil–Vinay, Lyricist: Yogesh	Recreated version of Achha Sila Diya
2023	Ram Siya Ram	Hindi, Sanskrit			Composer: Shreyas Puranik, Lyricist: Goswami Tulsidas	
2023	Pawan Bhakti De De Ram	Hindi, Sanskrit			Composer: Harshit Saxena, Lyricist: Sameer Anjaan	
2023	Sun Zara	Hindi			Composer: DJ Sheizwood, Lyricist: KRK	
2023	Afra Tafri	Hindi	Salim–Sulaiman	Shraddha Pandit		Song from Bhoomi 2023
2024	Avadh Mein Laute Hai Shri Ram	Hindi, Sanskrit			Composer: Shreyas Puranik, Lyricist: Ashutosh Agnihotri	All these Songs for Shri Ram Mandir inauguration on 22 January 2024
2024	Ram Ke Hriday Mein	Hindi, Sanskrit	Ricky Kej	Geet Sagar	Malini Awasthi	All these Songs for Shri Ram Mandir inauguration on 22 January 2024
2024	Shri Ram Lalla	Hindi, Sanskrit	Amitabh S Verma	Mukul Varma		All these Songs for Shri Ram Mandir inauguration on 22 January 2024
2024	Bolo Ram Ram	Hindi, Sanskrit	Mandeep Panghal	Rakesh Kumaar		All these Songs for Shri Ram Mandir inauguration on 22 January 2024
2024	Hamare Ram Aaye Hai	Hindi, Sanskrit	Abhishek Thakur			Starring Arun Govil, Deepika Chikhalia, Sunil Lahri in music video
2024	Chup Chup Chup	Hindi			Composer & Lyricist: Mann, Co Singer: Antara Mitra	
2024	Bhole Ke Mandir Mein	Hindi, Sanskrit			Composer: Deepali Sathe, Lyricist: Saaveri Verma	
2024	Ramleela (Humare Ram)	Hindi, Sanskrit			Composer: Saurabh Mehta, Lyricist: Aalok Shrivastav	This song is from HUMARE RAM Ft. Ashutosh Rana and Rahull R Bhuchar
2024	O Mere Humnava	Hindi			Co-singer: Teesha Nigam	
2024	"Payoji Maine Ram Ratan Dhan Payo"	Hindi, Sanskrit	Raaj Aashoo	Seepi Jha, Traditional	Jaya Kishori	
2024	"Adhoore Nagme"	Hindi	Vinay N Vinay	Vinay Tanha		
2024	Jaan Le Gayi	Hindi	Salim–Sulaiman	Shraddha Pandit	Co-Singer: Vishal Dadlani	Song from Bhoomi 2024
2024	Halla Bol	Hindi	Rishiking	Rishiking, P Narahari		Indore Swachhta Anthem
2024	Maa Apne Dware Bula Le Mujhe (Bhajan)	Hindi	Payal Dev	Manoj Muntashir		
2024	Ye Dil Deewana	Hindi	Shamir Tandon, Pranshu Jha	Deepak Adhikari,Anurag Dubey,Abhinav Nagar		Tips Single
2024	Raghupati Raghav Raja Ram	Hindi	Vishnu Digambar Paluskar, Sonu Nigam	Shri Lakshmanacharya Ji		
2024	Kahani Ayodhya Dham Ki	Hindi	Rashid Khan	Navdeep Panchal Shubh		
2025	Shiva Shiva Shankara	Hindi	Shreyas Puranik	Ashutosh Agnihotri		Starring Arvind Arora
2025	Kenu Ei Mone	Bengali	Debojit Dutta	Rajiv Dutta		For his label "I Believe Music"
2025	Kal Raat Meri Baahon Mein	Hindi	Pandit Vishwa Prakash	Pandit Vishwa Prakash		A 2002 track re-released on his label "I Believe Music"
2025	Jaadugari	Hindi	Salim–Sulaiman	Shraddha Pandit Vishal Dadlani	Designiter remix version for "Jaan Le Gayi"	
2025	Shri Ram Chandra Kripalu	Hindi		Goswami Tulsidas	Dharini Thakkar	Released on his label "I Believe Music"
2025	Kahani Meri	Hindi	PVNS Rohit	G Ritesh Rao, Sonu Nigam		Released on his birthday on his label "I Believe Music"
2025	Hey Shivnandan	Hindi	Dr C M Verma	Saaveri Verma		Ganesh Chaturthi song Released on his label "I Believe Music"

== English singles ==
Year	Single title	Co-singer	Notes
2003	My Sweet Lord	Sandeep Chowta	This song is from album Mitti - The Call Of The Soil by Sandeep Chowta
2011	"This Is It"	Jermaine Jackson	A tribute to Michael Jackson
2011	"I Wanna Go (Desi Hits! Remix)"	Britney Spears	
2011	"Let's Go For Glory"		Sonu presented this song at 2011 Cricket World Cup opening ceremony
2014	Trini Ladki (Chutney music)		
2015	Imagine (UNICEF: World Version)	John Lennon, Katy Perry, Priyanka Chopra, Will.i.am	
2017	"Underwater"	Kshmr	
2018	Hall Of Fame	MC Yogi	
2018	OMT	Shannon K	
2019	Fire in the Sky	Natalia Lesz	
2021	"Know Who You Are"		This song is inspired by Chapter 2 of the Bhagavad Gita. Sonu Nigam sings the role of Krishna in English
2024	Ave Maria (Latin)		Lyrics: Franz Schubert Orchestrated, Arranged, Designed and Produced by Anurag Saikia & Ishan Das

== Television serial songs ==
Year	Song title	Serial	Notes
1992	Hum Toh Chhaila Ban Gaye	Talaash	
1994	Chandrakanta	Chandrakanta	
2000	Shri Ganesh	Shree Ganesh	
2001	Gul Bhi Woh Chand Bhi Woh	Noorjahan	
2002	Kumkum	Kumkum – Ek Pyara Sa Bandhan	
2003	Karishma	Karishma – The Miracles Of Destiny	
2003	Kahaani Terrii Merrii (Title Track)	Kahani Terrii Merrii	
2004	Ayushmaan	Ayushmaan	
2004	Ana Ki Chandani Se	Ana	
2005	Miilee	Miilee	
2005	Riyasat	Riyasat	
2007	Dill Mill Gayye	Dill Mill Gayye	
2007	Amber Dhara	Amber Dhara	
2016	Sach Hone Ko Hai Sapne	Mission Sapne	
2017	Chal Geet Gaaye		Sony TV theme Song
2018	Guddan Tumse Na Ho Payega (Title Track)	Guddan Tumse Na Ho Payega	
2019	Bharat Ki Baat (Title Track)	Bharat Ki Baat	
2019	NAMAH Theme Song	Namah Lakshmi Narayan	
2019	Shyam Ke Rogan Lele	Modi: Journey of a Common Man	Miniseries
2020	Diljaniya	Wrong Number	Season 2
2021	Mann Ke Jo Turath Hai	Ramyug	
2021	Gum Ho Jaayen	Gum Ho Jaayen	Web series
2022	Kaisi Baatein Karte Ho	Modern Love Mumbai	
2025	Fauji 2 (Title Track)	Fauji 2	
2025	Bhagwan	Fauji 2	
2025	Priyatama	Lakshmi Niwas	

== Hindi film songs ==
=== 1980s ===
Year	Film	#	Song	Composer(s)	Lyricist(s)	Co-artist(s)	Note
1993	Muqabla	1	"Chhodo Mujhe Jane Do Mere Sanwariya"	Dilip Sen–Sameer Sen	Mahendra Dehlvi	Anuradha Paudwal	
1993	Muqabla	2	"Naino Ko Karne Do Naino Se Baat"	Dilip Sen–Sameer Sen	Maya Govind	Anuradha Paudwal	
1993	Muqabla	3	"Ik Ladki Ne Mujhe Jadu Kiya"	Dilip Sen–Sameer Sen	Nawab Arzoo	Abhijeet Bhattacharya	
1993	Muqabla	4	"Chal Chaliye Wahan Pe Diljani"	Dilip Sen–Sameer Sen	Kulwant Jani	Abhijeet Bhattacharya	
1993	Meherbaan	5	"Agar Aasman Tak Mere Haath Jaate"	Dilip Sen–Sameer Sen	Rani Malik	Anuradha Paudwal	
1993	Meherbaan	6	"Dhire Se Chupke Se Dil Ne Liya Tera Naam"	Dilip Sen–Sameer Sen	Rani Malik	Anuradha Paudwal	
1993	Shabnam	7	"Jis Dil Mein Tu Nahin Use Jaunga Chhodkar"	Anu Malik	Zameer Kazmi		
1993	Shabnam	8	"Gungunaye Sajan Apna Ek Ek Pal"	Anu Malik	Qateel Shifai	Anuradha Paudwal	
1993	Aaja Meri Jaan	9	"O Aasman Wale Zameen Par Utar Ke Dekh"	Amar–Utpal	Maya Govind		
1993	Aaja Meri Jaan	10	"Ishq Mein Hum Tumhein Kya Batayen"	Nikhil–Vinay	Akhlakh Sagri		
1993	Kasam Teri Kasam	111	"Zindagi Ki Raahon Mein Ranjo Gham Ke Mele Hain"	Nikhil–Vinay	Saba Afghani		
1993	Kasam Teri Kasam	19	"Parody"	Amar–Utpal	Manohar Iyer	Anuradha Paudwal, Babla Mehta, Sudesh Bhosle, Kavita Paudwal	
1993	Kasam Teri Kasam	133	"Mera Tere Bin Lagda Na Ji"	Amar–Utpal	Naqsh Lyallpuri	Anuradha Paudwal	
1994	Khuddar	14	"Khat Likhna Humne"	Anu Malik	Rahat Indori	Alka Yagnik	
1994	Khuddar	15	"Woh Aankh Hi Kya"	Anu Malik	Zameer Kazmi		
1994	Cheetah	16	"Ya Habibi Mehbooba Teri Mahjabi"	Jatin–Lalit	Dev Kohli	Kavita Krishnamurthy	
1994	Aag	17	"Tera Kya Lagta Hai"	Dilip Sen–Sameer Sen	Sameer	Ila Arun, Alka Yagnik	
1994	Triyacharitra	18	"Aaya Dekho Re Salona Din"	Salil Chowdhury	Yogesh	Antara Chowdhury	
1994	Stuntman	19	"Yeh Aankhen Hai Aaina"	Nadeem–Shravan	Sameer		
1994	Deewana Sanam	20	"Hamri Khatiya Ke Upar Aaja"	Surinder Kohli	Dev Kohli	Sapna Mukherjee	
1995	Sauda	21	"Koi Dil Na"	Aadesh Shrivastava	Kulwant Jani	Asha Bhosle	
1995	Naajayaz	22	"Tujhe Pyaar Karte Karte"	Anu Malik	Rahat Indori		
1995	Jai Maa Vaishno Devi	232	"O Aaye Tere Bhawan"	Amar–Utpal	Bharat Acharya	Anuradha Paudwal	
1995	Jai Maa Vaishno Devi	242	"Tujhe Kab Se Pukare"	Surinder Kohli	Naqsh Lyallpuri		
1995	Jai Maa Vaishno Devi	252	"Do Akam Do"	Amar–Utpal	Gopal Sharma	Anuradha Paudwal	
1995	Jai Maa Vaishno Devi	262	"Aaja Ma Tainu Akhiyan Udeek Diyan"	Surinder Kohli	Naqsh Lyallpuri		
1995	Jai Maa Vaishno Devi	27	"Mere Naino Ki Pyaas"	Amar–Utpal	Bharat Acharya		
1995	Aazmayish	28	"Chooriyan O Chooriyan"	Anand–Milind	Anand Bakshi	Bela Sulakhe	
1995	Aazmayish	29	"Mera Dil Kho Gaya"	Anand–Milind	Anand Bakshi		
1995	Aazmayish	30	"Yaar Mat Ja"	Anand–Milind	Anand Bakshi	Alka Yagnik	
1995	Aazmayish	31	"Kanta Lage Nikal Jaye"	Anand–Milind	Anand Bakshi	Alka Yagnik	
1995	Aazmayish	32	"O My Daddy"	Anand–Milind	Anand Bakshi	Kumar Sanu	
1995	Bewafa Sanam	33	"Zindagi Mein To Sabhi Pyar Kiya Karte Hain"	Milind Sagar	Rani Malik		
1995	Bewafa Sanam	34	"Achha Sila Diya Tune Mere Pyar Ka"	Nikhil–Vinay	Yogesh		
1995	Bewafa Sanam	35	"Teri Gali Wich"	Nikhil–Vinay	Rani Malik		
1995	Bewafa Sanam	36	"Yeh Dhoke Pyar Ke Dhoke"	Nikhil–Vinay	Yogesh		
1995	Gaddaar	37	"Aaj Kal Ki Nahin"	Nadeem–Shravan	Sameer	Kumar Sanu	
1995	Hulchul	38	"Bando Pe Apne Ae Daata"	Anu Malik	Abhilash	Sadhana Sargam	
1995	Barsaat	39	"Ek Haseen Ladki Se"	Nadeem–Shravan	Sameer	Alka Yagnik	
1995	Barsaat	40	"Dil Pagal Deewana Hai"	Nadeem–Shravan	Sameer		
1995	Barsaat	41	"Ishq Mein Ek Pal"	Nadeem–Shravan	Sameer	Kavita Krishnamurthy	
1995	Police Lockup	41	"Mera Yakeen Karo Maine Mohabbat Ki Hai"	Sawan Kumar Sawan	Galib	Kavita Krishnamurthy	
1995	Ram Jaane	42	"Ram Jaane"	Anu Malik	Anand Bakshi	Udit Narayan, Alka Yagnik	
1996	Agni Sakshi	43	"Mere Kaleje Se"	Nadeem–Shravan	Sameer	Alka Yagnik	
1996	Aisi Bhi Kya Jaldi Hai	44	"Khwabon Ki Malika Ho Ya"	Gauri Shankar Sharma	Majrooh Sultanpuri	Alka Yagnik	
1996	Aisi Bhi Kya Jaldi Hai	45	"Kinna Sona Tujhe Rab Ne Banaya"	Gauri Shankar Sharma	Majrooh Sultanpuri		
1996	Papa Kehte Hai	46	"Mujhse Naraaz Ho To"	Rajesh Roshan	Javed Akhtar		
1996	Himmatvar	47	"Salam Tasleem Aadab"	Nadeem–Shravan	Sameer	Sapna Mukherjee	
1996	Khiladiyon Ka Khiladi	48	"Maa Sherawaliye"	Anu Malik	Dev Kohli		
1996	Jeet	49	"Abhi Saans Lene Ki Fursat Nahin Hai"	Nadeem–Shravan	Koti	Alka Yagnik	
1996	Laalchee	50	"Kheencho Dil Ki Car"	Dilip Sen–Sameer Sen	Sameer	Mitali Chowdhury	
1996	Duniya Dilwalon Ki	51	"Jaari Jaa E Hawa"	A. R. Rahman		S.P. Balasubramaniam, Dominique Cerejo	Dubbed film
1996	Duniya Dilwalon Ki	52	"O Meri Jaan"	A. R. Rahman			Dubbed film
1996	Chal Kaanwariya Shiv Ke Dham	53	"Chal Kaanwariya Shiv Ke Dham" (Duet)	Surinder Kohli	Balbir Nirdosh	Anuradha Paudwal	
1996	Chal Kaanwariya Shiv Ke Dham	54	"Chal Kaanwariya Shiv Ke Dham"	Surinder Kohli	Balbir Nirdosh		
1996	Chal Kaanwariya Shiv Ke Dham	55	"Shiv Ka Naam Lo"	Surinder Kohli	Shyam Raj		
1996	Mr. Romeo	56	"Mona Lisa"	A. R. Rahman	P. K. Mishra	Raqueeb Alam	Dubbed film
1997	Hero No. 1	57	"U.P Wala Thumka"	Anand–Milind	Sameer		
1997	Jodidar	58	"Mera Mehboob Tu"	Bappi Lahiri	Indeevar	Preeti Singh	
1997	Tamanna	59	"Uth Meri Jaan"	Anu Malik	Kaifi Azmi		
1997	Tamanna	60	"Ghar Se Masjid"	Anu Malik	Nida Fazli		
1997	Himalay Putra	61	"Kaga Sab Tan Khaiyo"	Anu Malik	Dev Kohli	Alka Yagnik	
1997	Border	62	"Sandese Aate Hai"	Anu Malik	Javed Akhtar	Roop Kumar Rathod	
1997	Border	63	"Hamen Jab Se Mohabbat"	Anu Malik	Javed Akhtar	Alka Yagnik	
1997	Pardes	64	"Yeh Dil Deewana"	Nadeem–Shravan	Anand Bakshi	Add. vocals Shankar Mahadevan, Ehsaan Noorani, Hema Sardesai	
1997	Aur Pyaar Ho Gaya	65	"Ek Din Kahin"	Nusrat Fateh Ali Khan	Javed Akhtar		
1997	Aur Pyaar Ho Gaya	66	"Hum Se Rahoge"	Nusrat Fateh Ali Khan	Javed Akhtar		
1997	Aur Pyaar Ho Gaya	67	"Uttar Dakshin"	Nusrat Fateh Ali Khan	Javed Akhtar	Alka Yagnik	
1997	Daud	68	"Shabba Shabba"	A. R. Rahman	Mehboob	Ranu Mukherjee, Neeraj Vora	
1997	Prithvi	69	"Rang Hai Pheeke Ghata Kya Hai"	Sukhwinder Singh	Madan Pal	Anuradha Paudwal	
1997	Mohabbat	70	"Aina Bataa Kaise"	Nadeem–Shravan	Sameer	Vinod Rathod	
1997	Deewana Mastana	71	"Hungama Ho Gaya"	Laxmikant–Pyarelal	Anand Bakshi	Poornima	
1997	Krantikari	72	"Ankhon Mein Hai Teri"	Burman Bros	Nawab Arzoo		
1993	Chaar Dham	73	"Jai Jai Badri Dham"	Surinder Kohli	Vinay Bihari		
1993	Jaane Jigar	74	"Lau Kaha Se Mai Wo Jubaa"	Rajesh Roshan	Javed Akhtar	Abhijeet Bhattacharya, Poornima	
1993	Chandaal	75	"Peg Patiyala Ka"	Anand–Milind	Dev Kohli	Jaspinder Narula	
1993	Deewana Hoon Pagal Nahi	76	"English Gana Russi"	Aadesh Shrivastava	Dev Kohli	Kavita Krishnamurthy	
1993	Keemat – They Are Back	77	"De Diya Dil Piya"	Rajesh Roshan	Indeevar	Alisha Chinai	
1993	Dand Nayak	78	"Bahut Door Jaane"	Rajesh Roshan	Anand Bakshi	Sadhana Sargam	
1993	Dand Nayak	79	"Happy Birthday"	Rajesh Roshan	Anand Bakshi	Alka Yagnik	
1993	Jeans	80	"Columbus"	A. R. Rahman	Javed Akhtar	A. R. Rahman	Dubbed film
1993	Jeans	81	"Kehne Do Dadi"	A. R. Rahman	Javed Akhtar	Kavita Paudwal, Sukhwinder Singh, Sangeetha	Dubbed film
1993	Jab Pyaar Kisise Hota Hai	82	"Chal Pyar Karegi"	Jatin–Lalit	Anand Bakshi	Alka Yagnik	
1993	Major Saab	83	"Sona Sona"	Aadesh Shrivastava	Dev Kohli	Sudesh Bhosle, Jaspinder Narula	
1993	Dulhe Raja	84	"Ankhiyon Se Goli Maare"	Anand–Milind	Sameer	Jaspinder Narula	
1993	Dulhe Raja	85	"Kahan Raja Bhoj Kahan Gangu Teli"	Anand–Milind	Sameer	Vinod Rathod	
1993	Dulhe Raja	86	"Aayi Ban Ke Root"	Anand–Milind	Sameer	Anuradha Paudwal	
1993	Dil Se..	87	"Satrangi Re"	A. R. Rahman	Gulzar	Kavita Krishnamurthy	
1993	Maharaja	88	"Thero To Sahi Socho To Zara"	Nadeem–Shravan	Sameer		
1993	Maharaja	89	"Jab Tum Aa Jaate Ho"	Nadeem–Shravan	Sameer	Kavita Krishnamurthy	
1993	Maharaja	90	"Hai Ajnabi"	Nadeem–Shravan	Sameer		
1993	Sar Utha Ke Jiyo	91	"Meri Zindagi Meri Jaan" (Sad)	Anand–Milind	Sameer	Suresh Wadkar	
1993	Sar Utha Ke Jiyo	92	"Meri Zindagi Meri Jaan"	Anand–Milind	Sameer	Suresh Wadkar, Chandana Dixit	
1993	Devta	93	"Ek Tuta Tara Hun"	Dilip Sen–Sameer Sen	Dev Kohli	Anuradha Paudwal	
1993	Hero Hindustani	94	"Chand Nazar Aa Gaya"	Anu Malik	Gauhar Kanpuri	Alka Yagnik, Iqbal–Afzal Sabri	
1993	Hero Hindustani	95	"Maahe Ramzan"	Anu Malik	Gauhar Kanpuri	Alka Yagnik, Iqbal–Afzal Sabri	
1993	Soldier	96	"Tera Rang Balle Balle"	Anu Malik	Sameer	Jaspinder Narula	
1993	Soldier	97	"Meri Saanson Mein Samaye"	Anu Malik	Sameer		
1993	Doli Saja Ke Rakhna	98	"Bol Sajni Mori Sajni"	A. R. Rahman	Mehboob Kotwal	Kavita Krishnamurthy	
1993	China Gate	99	"Humko To Rahna Hai"	Anu Malik	Sameer	Hariharan, Vinod Rathod	
1993	China Gate	100	"Is Mitti Ka Karz Tha Mujhpe"	Anu Malik	Sameer		
1993	Do Numbri	101	"Galiyan Di Kudi Ye Hai Phuljhadi"	Tabun Sutradhar	Dev Kohli	Poornima	
1999	Aa Ab Laut Chalen	102	"O Yaaron Maaf Karna"	Nadeem–Shravan	Sameer	Kumar Sanu, Abhijeet, Shabbir Kumar, Saud Khan, Vijeta	
1999	Hum Aapke Dil Mein Rehte Hain	103	"Dhingtara Dhingtara"	Anu Malik	Sameer	Hema Sardesai, Rahul Seth	
1999	Aarzoo	104	"Rabba Rabba I Love You"	Anu Malik	Anand Bakshi		
1999	Aarzoo	105	"Jai Mata Di... Jai Mata Di"	Anu Malik	Anand Bakshi		
1999	Anari No.1	106	"Tujhe Dekh Ke Jaane Jaana"	Aadesh Shrivastava	Dev Kohli	Alka Yagnik	
1999	Sarfarosh	107	"Zindagi Maut Na Ban Jaye"	Jatin–Lalit	Israr Ansari	Roop Kumar Rathod	
1999	Sooryavansham	108	"Chori Chori"	Anu Malik	Sameer	Amitabh Bachchan, Jaspinder Narula	
1999	Sooryavansham	109	"Peepal Ke Patwa"	Anu Malik	Sameer	Jaspinder Narula	
1999	Sooryavansham	110	"Sooryavansham"	Anu Malik	Sameer		
1999	Haseena Maan Jaayegi	111	"I Love You Bol Daal"	Anu Malik	Nitin Rikwar	Alka Yagnik, Sudesh Bhosle, Sanjay Dutt, Govinda	
1999	Haseena Maan Jaayegi	112	"What Is Mobile Number"	Anu Malik	Sameer	Alka Yagnik	
1999	Haseena Maan Jaayegi	113	"Panga Na Le Mere Naal"	Anu Malik	Sameer	Poornima	
1999	Haseena Maan Jaayegi	114	"Yoon Hua"	Anu Malik	Sameer	Alka Yagnik	
1999	Haseena Maan Jaayegi	115	"Dulha Bhi Lajawab Hai"	Anu Malik	Sameer	Kavita Krishnamurthy, Ram Shankar	
1999	Prince No. 1	116	"Pyar Kar Shuru"	Mani Sharma	Ravinder Rawal	Sunidhi Chauhan	Dubbed film
1999	Prince No. 1	117	"Aashiqui Hai Naam Dosto"	Mani Sharma	Ravinder Rawal		Dubbed film
1999	Taal	118	"Ishq Bina"	A. R. Rahman	Anand Bakshi	Anuradha Sriram, Sujatha, A. R. Rahman	
1999	Sangharsh	119	"Dil Ka Qaraar"	Jatin–Lalit	Sameer	Shradha Pandit	
1999	Sangharsh	120	"Mujhe Raat Din Bas"	Jatin–Lalit	Sameer		
1999	Sangharsh	121	"Hum Badi Door Chalen Aaye"	Jatin–Lalit	Sameer	Shradha Pandit	
1999	Hello Brother	122	"Hello Brother"	Sajid–Wajid	Faaiz Anwar	Kamaal Khan, Jaspinder Narula	
1999	Hello Brother	123	"Hello Brother" (Remix)	Sajid–Wajid	Faaiz Anwar		
1999	Hello Brother	124	"Area Ka Hero"	Sajid–Wajid	Jalees Sherwani	Hema Sardesai	
1999	Hum Saath-Saath Hain	125	"Sunoji Dulhan Ek Baat Sunoji"	Raamlaxman	Ravinder Rawal	Roop, Pratima Rao, Udit, Kavita	
1999	Dillagi	126	"Dillagi"	Shankar–Ehsaan–Loy	Javed Akhtar	Abhijeet, Udit, Sukhwinder, Shankar, Shaan, Alka, Kavita, Mahalakshmi, Jaspinder	
1999	Yeh Hai Mumbai Meri Jaan	1299	"Tu Bada Gazab Ka Yaar Hai"	Jatin–Lalit	Indeevar	Abhijeet, Kavita Krishnamurthy	
1999	Jaanwar	1300	"Mera Yaar Dildaar"	Anand–Milind	Sameer	Alka, Jaspinder, Sukhwinder	
1999	Jaanwar	1301	"Jaanewale"	Anand–Milind	Sameer	Alka Yagnik, Ram Shanker	

=== 2000s ===
Year	Film	#	Song	Composer(s)	Lyricist(s)	Co-artist(s)	Note
2000	Jwalamukhi	130	"Yaara Yaara"	Anand–Milind	Sameer	Jaspinder Narula	
2000	Bulandi	131	"Hungama Ho Jaaye"	Viju Shah	Anand Bakshi	Jaspinder Narula	
2000	Mela	132	"Mela Dilon Ka"(Celebration)	Anu Malik	Dev Kohli	Alka Yagnik, Roop Kumar Rathod, Shankar Mahadevan, Jaspinder Narula, Hema Sardesai, Nitin Mukesh, Anmol	
2000	Mela	133	"Mela Dilon Ka"(Grand Finale)	Anu Malik	Dev Kohli, Dharmesh Darshan	Alka Yagnik, Udit Narayan, Sadhana Sargam, Abhijeet, Shankar Mahadevan, Poonam Bhatia	
2000	Phir Bhi Dil Hai Hindustani	134	"Banke Tera Jogi"	Jatin–Lalit	Javed Akhtar	Alka Yagnik	
2000	Agniputra	135	"Kisne Dekha Kisne Jana"	Nikhil–Vinay	Anand Bakshi		
2000	Pukar	136	"Kismat Se Tum Humko Mile"	A. R. Rahman	Javed Akhtar	Anuradha Paudwal	
2000	Badal	137	"Na Milo Kahin Pyar"	Anu Malik	Sameer	Kavita Krishnamurthy	
2000	Dulhan Hum Le Jayenge	138	"Pyar Dilon Ka Mela Hai"	Himesh Reshammiya	Sudhakar Sharma	Alka Yagnik	
2000	Dulhan Hum Le Jayenge	139	"Dheere Dheere"	Himesh Reshammiya	Sudhakar Sharma	Alka Yagnik	
2000	Dulhan Hum Le Jayenge	140	"Tera Pallu Sarka Jaaye Re"	Himesh Reshammiya	Sudhakar Sharma	Alka Yagnik	
2000	Dulhan Hum Le Jayenge	141	"O Mr. Raja"	Himesh Reshammiya	Sudhakar Sharma	Alka Yagnik	
2000	Dulhan Hum Le Jayenge	142	"Chhamiya"	Himesh Reshammiya	Sudhakar Sharma	Alka Yagnik	
2000	Baaghi	143	"Chaha Tha Tujhe"	Sajid–Wajid	Faaiz Anwar	Sunidhi Chauhan	
2000	Hadh Kar Di Aapne	144	"Beqarar Main Beqarar"	Anand Raj Anand	Anand Bakshi		
2000	Chal Mere Bhai	145	"Meri Neend Jaane Lagi Hai"	Anand–Milind	Sameer	Vinod Rathod, Poornima, Vaijanti	
2000	Chal Mere Bhai	146	"O Mehendi Rang Layee"	Anand–Milind	Sameer	Udit Narayan, Alka Yagnik, Jaspinder Narula	
2000	Chal Mere Bhai	147	"Aaj Kal Ki Ladkiyan"	Anand–Milind	Sameer	Alka Yagnik	
2000	Kya Kehna	148	"Jaaneman Jaane Jaan"	Rajesh Roshan	Majrooh Sultanpuri	Alka Yagnik	
2000	Kya Kehna	149	"O Soniye Dil Jaaniye"	Rajesh Roshan	Majrooh Sultanpuri	Alka Yagnik, Kumar Sanu	
2000	Hum To Mohabbat Karega	150	"Hum To Mohabbat Karega"	Anu Malik	Majrooh Sultanpuri	Sunidhi Chauhan	
2000	Joru Ka Ghulam	151	"Neeche Phoolon Ki Dukan"	Aadesh Shrivastava	Sameer	Aadesh Shrivastava	
2000	Joru Ka Ghulam	152	"Tumhare Bina Kuch"	Aadesh Shrivastava	Sameer	Hema Sardesai	
2000	Joru Ka Ghulam	153	"Woh Aayee"	Aadesh Shrivastava	Sameer	Alka Yagnik	
2000	Refugee	154	"Panchhi Nadiyan Pawan Ke Jhonke"	Anu Malik	Javed Akhtar	Alka Yagnik	
2000	Refugee	155	"Aisa Lagta Hai"	Anu Malik	Javed Akhtar	Alka Yagnik	
2000	Refugee	156	"Mere Humsafar"	Anu Malik	Javed Akhtar	Alka Yagnik	
2000	Refugee	157	"Taal Pe Jab"	Anu Malik	Javed Akhtar	Alka Yagnik	
2000	Jungle	158	"Pehli Baar"	Sandeep Chowta	Sameer	Sunidhi Chauhan	
2000	Jungle	159	"Do Pyaar"	Sandeep Chowta	Sameer	Sunidhi Chauhan	
2000	Jungle	160	"Aiyo Aiyo Rama"	Sandeep Chowta	Sameer	Sunidhi Chauhan, Sowmya Raoh, Makrand Deshpande	
2000	Jungle	161	"Sorry Baba Sorry"	Sandeep Chowta	Sameer	Sadhana Sargam	
2000	Kunwara	162	"Na Hira Na Moti"	Aadesh Shrivastava	Sameer	Hema Sardesai	
2000	Kunwara	163	"Urmila Re Urmila"	Aadesh Shrivastava	Sameer	Alka Yagnik	
2000	Kunwara	164	"Meri Chamak Chalo Maan Bhi Jaa"	Aadesh Shrivastava	Sameer	Alka Yagnik	
2000	Kunwara	165	"Jab Ladka Ho Kunwara"	Aadesh Shrivastava	Sameer	Alka Yagnik	
2000	Kunwara	166	"Sun Mere Sasure Main"	Aadesh Shrivastava	Sameer	Vinod Rathod	
2000	Kunwara	167	"Main Kunwara Aa Gaya"	Aadesh Shrivastava	Sameer		
2000	Kunwara	168	"Na Hira Na Moti"(Remix)	Aadesh Shrivastava	Sameer	Hema Sardesai	
2000	Kunwara	169	"Urmila Re Urmila"(Remix)	Aadesh Shrivastava	Sameer	Alka Yagnik	
2000	Kunwara	170	"Jab Ladka Ho Kunwara"(Remix)	Aadesh Shrivastava	Sameer	Alka Yagnik	
2000	Har Dil Jo Pyar Karega	171	"Aisa Pehli Baar Hua Hai"	Anu Malik	Sameer		
2000	Har Dil Jo Pyar Karega	172	"Aate Jaate Jo Milta Hai"	Anu Malik	Sameer	Alka Yagnik	
2000	Dhadkan	173	"Dil Ne Yeh Kaha Hai Dil Se"	Nadeem–Shravan	Sameer	Alka Yagnik	
2000	Tera Jadoo Chal Gayaa	174	"Tera Jadoo Chal Gay"	Ismail Darbar	Sameer	Chithra	
2000	Tera Jadoo Chal Gayaa	175	"Mujhe Pyaar Karo"	Ismail Darbar	Sameer	Alka Yagnik	
2000	Tera Jadoo Chal Gayaa	176	"Aye Chand Teri"	Ismail Darbar	Sameer	Alka Yagnik	
2000	Tera Jadoo Chal Gayaa	177	"Qayamat Ho"	Ismail Darbar	Sameer	Kavita Krishnamurthy	
2000	Fiza	178	"Tu Fiza Hai"	Anu Malik	Gulzar	Alka Yagnik	
2000	Fiza	179	"Gaya Gaya Dil"	Anu Malik	Sameer		
2000	Jai Jwala Maa	180	"Kuchh To Maiya Ka Haal Suna"	Surinder Kohli	Abhilash		
2000	Jai Jwala Maa	181	"Ghan Ghan Ghanghor Ghataon"	Surinder Kohli	Balbir Nirdosh		
2000	Aaghaaz	182	"Dosti Ho Gayi Re"	Anu Malik	Sameer	Sunidhi Chauhan	
2000	Aaghaaz	183	"Aaghaaz Karo"	Anu Malik	Sameer		
2000	Aaghaaz	184	"Dil Dil Dil"	Anu Malik	Sameer		
2000	Shikari	185	"Kudi Badi Hai Soni Soni"	Aadesh Shrivastava	Sameer		
2000	Kurukshetra	186	"Ishq Bhi Kya Cheez Hai"	Himesh Reshammiya	Sudhakar Sharma	Kumar Sanu, Alka Yagnik	
2000	Kahin Pyaar Na Ho Jaaye	187	"Kahin Pyar Na Ho Jaaye"	Himesh Reshammiya	Sudhakar Sharma	Alka Yagnik	
2000	Kahin Pyaar Na Ho Jaaye	188	"Pardesi"	Himesh Reshammiya	Sudhakar Sharma	Alka Yagnik	
2000	Kahin Pyaar Na Ho Jaaye	189	"Pardesi"(Part 2)	Himesh Reshammiya	Sudhakar Sharma		
2000	Kahin Pyaar Na Ho Jaaye	190	"Parody"	Himesh Reshammiya	Sudhakar Sharma	Kumar Sanu, Alka Yagnik	
2000	Khiladi 420	191	"Jagte Hain Hum"	Sanjeev–Darshan	Sameer	Kavita Krishnamurti	
2000	Khiladi 420	192	"Batiya Bujha Do"	Sanjeev–Darshan	Sameer	Kavita Krishnamurti	
2000	Khiladi 420	193	"Meri Biwi Ka Jawaab Nahin"	Sanjeev–Darshan	Sameer		
2001	Chori Chori Chupke Chupke	194	"No. 1 Punjabi"	Anu Malik	Sameer	Jaspinder Narula	
2001	Chori Chori Chupke Chupke	195	"Deewana Hai Yeh Mann"	Anu Malik	Sameer	Alka Yagnik	
2001	One 2 Ka 4	196	"Khamoshiyan Gungunane Lagi"	A. R. Rahman	Mehboob	Lata Mangeshkar	
2001	One 2 Ka 4	197	"Haye Dil Ki Bazi Laga"	A. R. Rahman	Mehboob	Alka Yagnik	
2001	One 2 Ka 4	198	"Osaka Muraiya"	A. R. Rahman	Majrooh Sultanpuri	Raageshwari	
2001	One 2 Ka 4	199	"Khamoshiyan Gungunane Lagi"(Part II)	A. R. Rahman	Mehboob	Lata Mangeshkar	
2001	Censor	200	"Sun Meri Gal"	Jatin–Lalit	Vinod Mahendra	Jaspinder Narula	
2001	Jodi No.1	201	"Laal Chunariya"	Himesh Reshammiya	Sudhakar Sharma		
2001	Jodi No.1	202	"Meri Mehbooba"	Anand Raaj Anand	Dev Kohli	Alka Yagnik	
2001	Jodi No.1	203	"Jodi No. 1"	Himesh Reshammiya	Sudhakar Sharma	Kumar Sanu, Alka Yagnik	
2001	Jodi No.1	204	"Tera Mera Dostana"	Himesh Reshammiya	Sudhakar Sharma	Kumar Sanu	
2001	Jodi No.1	205	"Mast Mast"	Anand Raaj Anand	Dev Kohli	Sunidhi Chauhan	
2001	Albela	206	"Hato Tum Baju"	Jatin–Lalit	Sameer		
2001	Pyaar Tune Kya Kiya	207	"Kambakht Ishq"	Sandeep Chowta	Nitin Raikwar	Asha Bhosle, Sukhwinder Singh	
2001	Pyaar Tune Kya Kiya	208	"Pyar Tune"	Sandeep Chowta	Nitin Raikwar	Alka Yagnik	
2001	Pyaar Tune Kya Kiya	209	"Ku Ku Ku"	Sandeep Chowta	Nitin Raikwar		
2001	Pyaar Tune Kya Kiya	210	"Jaana"	Sandeep Chowta	Nitin Raikwar	Kavita Krishnamurti	
2001	Pyaar Tune Kya Kiya	211	"Kambakht Mix"	Sandeep Chowta	Nitin Raikwar	Asha Bhosle, Sukhwinder Singh	
2001	Mujhe Kucch Kehna Hai	212	"Rabba Mere Rabba"	Anu Malik	Sameer		
2001	Mujhe Kucch Kehna Hai	213	"Guncha Hai Gul Hai"	Anu Malik	Sameer	Zubeen Garg, Raageshwari	
2001	Bas Itna Sa Khwaab Hai	214	"Ganga Maiya"	Aadesh Shrivastava	Nida Fazli		
2001	Tum Bin	215	"Chhoti Chhoti Raatein"	Nikhil–Vinay	Faaiz Anwar	Anuradha Paudwal	
2001	Tum Bin	216	"Meri Duniya Mein"	Nikhil–Vinay	Faaiz Anwar		
2001	Tum Bin	217	"Zoom Boombura"	Ravi Pawar	Faaiz Anwar		
2001	Tum Bin	218	"Suru Ru"	Ravi Pawar	Faaiz Anwar		
2001	Tum Bin	219	"Chhoti Chhoti Raatein - II"	Nikhil–Vinay	Faaiz Anwar	Anuradha Paudwal	
2001	Yaadein	220	"Chamakti Shaam Hai"	Anu Malik	Anand Bakshi	Alka Yagnik	
2001	Hum Ho Gaye Aapke	221	"Ishq Hai Kya"	Nadeem–Shravan	Sameer		
2001	Dil Chahta Hai	222	"Tanhayee"	Shankar–Ehsaan–Loy	Javed Akhtar		
2001	Lajja	223	"Saajan Ke Ghar Jana Hain"	Anu Malik	Sameer	Alka Yagnik, Richa Sharma	
2001	Rehnaa Hai Terre Dil Mein	224	"Rehnaa Hai Tere Dil Mein"	Harris Jayaraj	Sameer	Kavita Krishnamurthi	
2001	Rehnaa Hai Terre Dil Mein	225	"Oh Mama Mama"	Harris Jayaraj	Sameer		
2001	Rehnaa Hai Terre Dil Mein	226	"Kaise Mein Kahun Tujhse"	Harris Jayaraj	Sameer		
2001	Mitti	227	"Na Jaane Kya Jadoo Kiya"	Monty Sharma	Mehboob Kotwal	Vicky Mehta	
2001	Mitti	228	"Malum Nahin Mujhko"	Ali Ghani	Qaiser-Ul-Jafri	Kavita Krishnamurthy, Vinod Rathod	
2001	Mitti	229	"Papaji Tusi Great Ho"	Sajid–Wajid	Jalees Sherwani		
2001	Kabhi Khushi Kabhie Gham	230	"Bole Chudiyan"	Jatin–Lalit	Sameer	Kavita Krishnamurthi, Alka Yagnik, Amit Kumar, Udit Narayan	
2001	Kabhi Khushi Kabhie Gham	231	"You Are My Soniya"	Sandesh Shandilya	Sameer	Alka Yagnik	
2001	Kabhi Khushi Kabhie Gham	232	"Suraj Hua Maddham"	Sandesh Shandilya	Anil Pandey	Alka Yagnik	
2001	Kabhi Khushi Kabhie Gham	233	"Kabhi Khushi Kabhie Gham"(Sad Version)	Jatin–Lalit	Sameer		
2001	Kabhi Khushi Kabhie Gham	234	"Deewana Hai Dekho"	Sandesh Shandilya	Sameer	Alka Yagnik	
2001	Tere Liye	235	"Dil Dhapaak"	Jeet–Pritam	Abbas Tyrewala		
2001	Tere Liye	236	"Tere Liye"	Jeet–Pritam	Abbas Tyrewala		
2001	Tere Liye	237	"Suno Piya"	Jeet–Pritam	Abbas Tyrewala	Kavita Krishnamurthi	
2001	Tere Liye	238	"Chikna Ajnabi"	Jeet–Pritam	Abbas Tyrewala	Kavita Krishnamurthi	
2001	Tere Liye	239	"Tere Liye"(Sad)	Jeet–Pritam	Abbas Tyrewala	K.K.	
2001	Tere Liye	240	"Halka Halka Paani"	Jeet–Pritam	Abbas Tyrewala	Jaspinder Narula	
2001	Tere Liye	241	"Jee Lenge"	Jeet–Pritam	Abbas Tyrewala	K.K., Kavita Krishnamurthy, Swastika	
2001	Tere Liye	242	"Dil Dhapaak"(Remix)	Jeet–Pritam	Abbas Tyrewala		
2002	Yeh Dil Aashiqanaa	243	"Allah Allah"(Qawali)	Nadeem–Shravan	Sameer	Sabri Brothers, Alka Yagnik, Tauseef Akhtar	
2002	Maa Tujhhe Salaam	244	"Dekhne Ko Tujhko"	Sajid–Wajid	Sameer	Bhairvi	
2002	Maa Tujhhe Salaam	245	"Dekhne Ko Tujhko - II"	Sajid–Wajid	Sameer	Sunidhi Chauhan	
2002	Tumko Na Bhool Paayenge	246	"Bindiya Chamke, Choodi Khanke"	Daboo Malik	Salim Bijnori	Alka Yagnik	
2002	Tumko Na Bhool Paayenge	247	"Kya Hua Tujhe"	Daboo Malik	Salim Bijnori	Alka Yagnik	
2002	Tumko Na Bhool Paayenge	248	"Yeh Bekhudi, Deewangi"	Sajid–Wajid	Jalees–Rashid		
2002	Tumko Na Bhool Paayenge	249	"Mubarak Eid Mubarak"	Sajid–Wajid	Jalees–Rashid	Arvinder Singh, Sneha Pant	
2002	Tumko Na Bhool Paayenge	250	"Mehendi Hai Lagi Mere Haathon Mein"	Daboo Malik	Sudhakar Sharma	Jaspinder Narula	
2002	Tumko Na Bhool Paayenge	251	"Main To Ladki Kunwari"	Sajid–Wajid	Jalees–Rashid	Sneha Pant	
2002	Kranti	252	"Hayo Rabba"	Jatin–Lalit	Anand Bakshi	Kavita Krishnamurthi	
2002	Kya Yehi Pyaar Hai	253	"O Mahive"	Sajid–Wajid	Jalees–Rashid		
2002	Kya Yehi Pyaar Hai	254	"Pehli Pehli Baar Hai"	Sajid–Wajid	Jalees–Rashid	Alka Yagnik	
2002	Kya Yehi Pyaar Hai	255	"Aashiq Hoon"	Sajid–Wajid	Jalees–Rashid		
2002	Kya Yehi Pyaar Hai	256	"Tujhe Dekhkar Jeeta"	Sajid–Wajid	Jalees–Rashid	Kumar Sanu, Alka Yagnik	
2002	Aankhen	257	"Aankhen"	Aadesh Shrivastava	Prasoon Joshi	Remo Fernandes	
2002	Aankhen	258	"Kuchh Kasme"	Jatin–Lalit	Praveen Bhardwaj	Alka Yagnik	
2002	Aap Mujhe Achche Lagne Lage	259	"Kuchh Hum Mein Aisi Baaten Hai"	Rajesh Roshan	Ibrahim Ashk		
2002	Ansh: The Deadly Part	260	"Maasum Chehare"	Nadeem–Shravan	Sameer	Alka Yagnik	
2002	Tum Se Achcha Kaun Hai	261	"Dil Gaya Mera Dil Gaya"	Nadeem–Shravan	Sameer		
2002	Tum Se Achcha Kaun Hai	262	"Yeh Un Dinon Ki Baat Hai"	Nadeem–Shravan	Sameer	Sarika Kapoor	
2002	Tum Se Achcha Kaun Hai	263	"Door Wadiyon Se"	Nadeem–Shravan	Sameer		
2002	Tum Se Achcha Kaun Hai	264	"Jo Jaam Se Peeta Hoon"	Nadeem–Shravan	Sameer	Tauseef Akhtar	
2002	Ab Ke Baras	265	"Deewane Aate Jaate"	Anu Malik	Sameer	Alka Yagnik, Kunal Ganjawala	
2002	Ab Ke Baras	266	"Saari Umar Main Rahun"	Anu Malik	Sameer		
2002	Ab Ke Baras	267	"Hoga Hoga"	Anu Malik	Sameer	Preeti & Pinky	
2002	Ab Ke Baras	268	"Pyar Mohabbat"(Sad)	Anu Malik	Sameer	Anuradha Paudwal	
2002	Hum Tumhare Hain Sanam	269	"Khoye Khoye Din Hain"	Daboo Malik	Praveen Bhardwaj	Anuradha Paudwal	
2002	Hum Tumhare Hain Sanam	270	"Sab Kuchh Bhula Diya"	Bali Brahmabhatt	Kartik Avasthi		
2002	Hum Tumhare Hain Sanam	271	"Hum Tumhare Hain Sanam"(Sad)	Nikhil-Vinay	Sameer		
2002	Hum Tumhare Hain Sanam	272	"Na Na Nana"	Daboo Malik	Praveen Bhardwaj		
2002	Hum Tumhare Hain Sanam	273	"Dil Tod Aaya"	Sajid–Wajid	Jalees Sherwani		
2002	Hum Tumhare Hain Sanam	274	"Sab Kuchh Bhula Diya"	Bali Brahmabhatt	Kartik Avasthi	Sapna Awasthi	
2002	Yeh Kaisi Mohabbat	275	"Jhol Jhol"	Sandeep Chowta	Nitin Raikwar		
2002	Mere Yaar Ki Shaadi Hai	276	"Sharara"	Jeet–Pritam	Javed Akhtar	Asha Bhosle	Released throw the film
2002	Mere Yaar Ki Shaadi Hai	277	"Mere Yaar Ki Shaadi Hai"	Jeet–Pritam	Javed Akhtar	Udit Narayan, Alka Yagnik	
2002	Mere Yaar Ki Shaadi Hai	278	"Jaage Jaage"	Jeet–Pritam	Javed Akhtar	Udit Narayan, Alka Yagnik	
2002	The Legend of Bhagat Singh	279	"Mera Rang De Basanti"	A. R. Rahman	Sameer	Man Mohan Waris	
2002	The Legend of Bhagat Singh	280	"Sarfaroshi Ki Tamanna"	A. R. Rahman	Sameer		
2002	The Legend of Bhagat Singh	281	"Sarfaroshi Ki Tamanna (Sad)"	A. R. Rahman	Sameer	Hariharan	
2002	Awara Paagal Deewana	282	"Jise Hasna Rona Hai"	Anu Malik	Sameer	Alka Yagnik, Shaan, Udit Narayan, Sarika Kapoor, Sunidhi Chauhan	
2002	Awara Paagal Deewana	283	"Yen Tune Kya Kiya"	Anu Malik	Sameer	Anuradha Paudwal	
2002	Humraaz	284	"Life Ban Jayegi"	Himesh Reshammiya	Sudhakar Sharma	Jaspinder Narula	
2002	Humraaz	285	"Bardaasht"(Remix)	Himesh Reshammiya	Sudhakar Sharma	Sunidhi Chauhan	
2002	Akhiyon Se Goli Maare	286	"Gore Tan Se Sarakta Jaye"	Anand–Milind	Sameer	Alka Yagnik, Sanjeevani	
2002	Akhiyon Se Goli Maare	287	"Akkh Jo Tujh Se Lad Gayi Hai"	Anand Raaj Anand	Dev Kohli	Jaspinder Narula	
2002	Akhiyon Se Goli Maare	288	"O Chhori Gori Gori"	Anand–Milind	Sameer	Jaspinder Narula	
2002	Akhiyon Se Goli Maare	289	"Thumka Lagake Naachlo"	Dilip Sen–Sameer Sen	Nitin Raikwar	Vinod Rathod, Sanjeevani	
2002	Akhiyon Se Goli Maare	290	"Maine Tujhe Dekha"	Anand–Milind	Sameer	Alka Yagnik	
2002	Mujhse Dosti Karoge!	291	"Jaane Dil Mein"	Rahul Sharma	Anand Bakshi	Lata Mangeshkar	
2002	Mujhse Dosti Karoge!	292	"Oh My Darling"	Rahul Sharma	Anand Bakshi	Alisha Chinai	
2002	Mujhse Dosti Karoge!	293	"Jaane Dil Mein - 2"	Rahul Sharma	Anand Bakshi	Lata Mangeshkar	
2002	Mujhse Dosti Karoge!	294	"The Medley"	Rahul Sharma	Anand Bakshi	Lata Mangeshkar, Udit Narayan, Pamela Chopra	
2002	Jaani Dushman: Ek Anokhi Kahani	295	"Chal Kudiye"	Anand–Milind	Sameer	Jaspinder Narula	
2002	Jaani Dushman: Ek Anokhi Kahani	296	"Roop Salona Tera Dekh Ke"	Anand–Milind	Sameer	Poornima, Sanchaita, Harry Anand, Pamela Jain, Devendra Singh, Nayan Rathod	
2002	Jaani Dushman: Ek Anokhi Kahani	297	"Javed Bhai So Re Le"	Sandeep Chowta	Nitin Raikwar		
2002	Jaani Dushman: Ek Anokhi Kahani	298	"Jaaneman Tu Khub Hai"	Anand Raaj Anand	Dev Kohli	Sunidhi Chauhan	
2002	Jaani Dushman: Ek Anokhi Kahani	299	"Ishq Junu Hai"	Anand–Milind	Sameer	Alka Yagnik, Prashant	
2002	Soch	300	"Tohe Leke Savaria"	Jatin–Lalit	Sameer	Richa Sharma	
2002	Dil Hai Tumhaara	301	"O Sahiba O Sahiba"	Nadeem–Shravan	Sameer	Kavita Krishnamurthi	
2002	Dil Hai Tumhaara	302	"Chahe Zubaan"	Nadeem–Shravan	Sameer	Alka Yagnik	
2002	Shakti: The Power	303	"Ishq Kameena"	Anu Malik	Sameer	Alka Yagnik	
2002	Jeena Sirf Merre Liye	304	"Allah Allah"	Nadeem-Shravan	Sameer	Alka Yagnik	
2002	Saathiya	305	"Saathiya"	A. R. Rahman	Gulzar		
2002	Chalo Ishq Ladaaye	306	"Masti Masti"	Himesh Reshammiya	Sameer	Alka Yagnik	
2002	Chalo Ishq Ladaaye	307	"Tujhko Hi Dulhan Banaonga"	Himesh Reshammiya	Sameer	Alka Yagnik	
2002	Chalo Ishq Ladaaye	308	"Chalo Ishq Ladaaye"	Himesh Reshammiya	Sameer	Alka Yagnik	
2002	Chalo Ishq Ladaaye	309	"Aa Pyaar Kare Bindaas"	Himesh Reshammiya	Sameer		
2002	Chalo Ishq Ladaaye	310	"Pyaar Ka Funda"	Himesh Reshammiya	Sameer	Kavita Krishnamurthy	
2002	Chalo Ishq Ladaaye	311	"Pote Ko Dulha Banaongi"	Himesh Reshammiya	Sameer	Shobha Joshi	
2002	Chalo Ishq Ladaaye	312	"Masti Masti"(Remix)	Himesh Reshammiya	Sameer	Alka Yagnik	
2003	Aapko Pehle Bhi Kahin Dekha Hai	313	"Aapki Yaad Aaye To"(Happy)	Nikhil–Vinay	Sameer	Anuradha Paudwal	
2003	Aapko Pehle Bhi Kahin Dekha Hai	314	"Chhote The Alternate Trip"	Nikhil–Vinay	Sameer		
2003	Aapko Pehle Bhi Kahin Dekha Hai	315	"Ishq To Jaadoo Hai"	Nikhil–Vinay	Sameer	Alisha Chinai	
2003	Aapko Pehle Bhi Kahin Dekha Hai	316	"Kuch Bhi Na Kaha"	Nikhil–Vinay	Sameer	Anuradha Paudwal	
2003	Dum	317	"Jeena"	Sandeep Chowta	Nitin Raikwar	Sowmya Raoh	
2003	Dum	318	"Dil Hi Dil Mein"	Sandeep Chowta	Abbas Tyrewala	Sowmya Raoh	
2003	Dum	319	"Dum"	Sandeep Chowta	Abbas Tyrewala		
2003	Escape from Taliban	320	"Rimil Baba Dimil Baba"	Babul Bose, Vanraj Bhatia	Mehboob	Babul Supriyo, Sadhana Sargam, Amit Nagarkar	
2003	Kash Aap Hamare Hote	321	"Kaash Aap Hamare Hote"	Aadesh Shrivastava	Sameer	Alka Yagnik	
2003	Kash Aap Hamare Hote	322	"Shaawa Pardesiyon"	Aadesh Shrivastava	Sameer	Sukhwinder Singh	
2003	Kash Aap Hamare Hote	323	"Chalte Chalte"	Aadesh Shrivastava	Sameer		
2003	Kash Aap Hamare Hote	324	"Hum Bhi Mohabbat Mein Deewane Hote"	Aadesh Shrivastava	Praveen Bhardwaj	Anuradha Paudwal	
2003	Kash Aap Hamare Hote	325	"Mera Hindustan Hai"	Aadesh Shrivastava	Sameer		
2003	Kash Aap Hamare Hote	326	"Kaash Aap Hamare Hote"(Sad)	Aadesh Shrivastava	Praveen Bhardwaj		
2003	Kash Aap Hamare Hote	327	"Tumhi Se Hui Mohabbat"	Aadesh Shrivastava	Sameer		
2003	Love at Times Square	328	"Sapna Ho"	Aadesh Shrivastava	Prasoon Joshi	Vijeta Pandit	
2003	Dhund	329	"Mehki Mehki"	Viju Shah	Rakesh Mishra	Alka Yagnik	
2003	Ek Aur Ek Gyarah	330	"Ek Aur Ek Gyarah"	Shankar–Ehsaan–Loy	Sameer	Shankar Mahadevan	
2003	Ek Aur Ek Gyarah	331	"O Dushmana"	Shankar–Ehsaan–Loy	Sameer	Sowmya Raoh	
2003	Yeh Dil	332	"Tera Dilbar"	Nadeem–Shravan	Sameer	Alka Yagnik	
2003	Yeh Dil	333	"College Mein"	Nadeem–Shravan	Sameer		
2003	Yeh Dil	334	"Tera Dilbar"(Sad)	Nadeem–Shravan	Sameer	Alka Yagnik	
2003	Stumped	335	"Stumped"	Pritam	Abbas Tyrewala		
2003	Ishq Vishk	336	"Mujhpe Har Haseena"	Anu Malik	Sameer	Alisha Chinai, Kumar Sanu	
2003	Ishq Vishk	337	"Love Love Tum Karo"	Anu Malik	Sameer	Priya, Prachi	
2003	Ishq Vishk	338	"Dooba Re Dooba"	Anu Malik	Sameer		
2003	Ishq Vishk	339	"Theme Piece"	Anu Malik	Sameer	Alisha Chinai	
2003	Armaan	340	"Meri Zindagi Mein Aaye Ho"	Shankar–Ehsaan–Loy	Javed Akhtar	Sunidhi Chauhan	
2003	Andaaz	341	"Allah Kare Dil Na Lage Kisise"	Nadeem–Shravan	Sameer	Alka Yagnik	
2003	Andaaz	342	"Rabba Ishq Na Hove"	Nadeem–Shravan	Sameer	Alka Yagnik, Sapna Mukherjee, Kailash Kher	
2003	Chalte Chalte	343	"Gum Shuda"	Aadesh Shrivastava	Javed Akhtar		
2003	Border Hindustan Ka	344	"Hum Hind Ke Veer"	Dilip Hari Kishan	Tahir Ambalvi		
2003	Qayamat: City Under Threat	345	"Qayamat Qayamat"	Nadeem–Shravan	Sameer	Hema Sardesai	
2003	Darna Mana Hai	346	"Stop"	Salim–Sulaiman	Abbas Tyrewala	Sunidhi Chauhan	
2003	Hungama	347	"Hum Nahin"	Nadeem-Shravan	Sameer	Abhijeet, Alka Yagnik	
2003	Calcutta Mail	348	"Pyar Se Dekh Le Ek Nazar"	Anand Raaj Anand	Mehboob	Hamsika Iyer	
2003	Main Madhuri Dixit Banna Chahti Hoon	349	"Tumse Mili Nazar"	Nitin Raikwar	Nitin Raikwar	Rithika Sahani	
2003	Main Madhuri Dixit Banna Chahti Hoon	350	"Tumse Mili Nazar"(Remix)	Nitin Raikwar	Nitin Raikwar	Rithika Sahani	
2003	Inteha	351	"Dhalne Lagi Hai Raat"	Anu Malik	Rahat Indori	Shreya Ghoshal	
2003	Inteha	352	"Dhalne Lagi Hai Raat"(Sad)	Anu Malik	Rahat Indori		
2003	Inteha	353	"Ab Humse Akele Raha Jaaye Na"	Anu Malik	Praveen Bhardwaj	Shreya Ghoshal	
2003	Inteha	354	"Dhalne Lagi Hai Raat"(Version)	Anu Malik	Rahat Indori		
2003	Jodi Kya Banayi Wah Wah Ramji	355	"Sun Mere Mahiya"	Anand Raj Anand	Dev Kohli	Shreya Ghoshal	
2003	Kal Ho Naa Ho	356	"Kal Ho Naa Ho"	Shankar–Ehsaan–Loy	Javed Akhtar		
2003	Kal Ho Naa Ho	357	"Maahi Ve"	Shankar–Ehsaan–Loy	Javed Akhtar	Sadhana Sargam, Sujata Bhattacharya, Udit Narayan, Shankar Mahadevan	
2003	Kal Ho Naa Ho	358	"Kal Ho Naa Ho"(Sad)	Shankar–Ehsaan–Loy	Javed Akhtar	Alka Yagnik, Richa Sharma	
2003	Aanch	359	"Dil Ke Arma Tarse"	Sanjeev–Darshan	Poojashree	Mahalakshmi Iyer	
2003	Dil Pardesi Ho Gayaa	360	"Dil Pardesi Ho Gaya"	Usha Khanna	Saawan Kumaar	Alka Yagnik	
2003	Dil Pardesi Ho Gayaa	361	"O Shaheedon"	Usha Khanna	Saawan Kumaar		
2003	Mudda – The Issue	362	"Kutta Kaate"	Jeet–Pritam	Saurabh Shukla		
2003	Fun2shh... Dudes in the 10th Century	363	"Time Kharab Hai"	Pritam		Farida Jalal, Sudesh Bhosle, Paresh Rawal, Iqbal Khan, Anuj Sawhney	
2004	Aetbaar	364	"Saansein Ghulne Lageen"	Rajesh Roshan	Chandrashekhar Rajit	Shreya Ghoshal	
2004	Khakee	365	"Youn Hi Tum Mujhse Pyar Karte Raho"	Ram Sampath	Sameer	Shreya Ghoshal	
2004	Khakee	366	"Dil Dooba"	Ram Sampath	Sameer	Shreya Ghoshal	
2004	Khakee	367	"Wada Raha"(Sad)	Ram Sampath	Sameer		
2004	Khakee	368	"Dil Dooba"(Remix)	Ram Sampath	Sameer	Shreya Ghoshal	
2004	Khakee	369	"Uppar Wale"	Ram Sampath	Sameer	Sukhwinder Singh, Kunal Ganjawala	
2004	Suno Sasurjee	370	"Tota Mirchi"	Sanjeev–Darshan	Sameer	Alka Yagnik	
2004	Suno Sasurjee	371	"Kardo Kardo Shaadi Sasurjee"	Sanjeev–Darshan	Vinay Bihari	Vinod Rathod, Sapna Mukherjee, Arshad	
2004	Agnipankh	372	"Khamoshi Aashiqo Ki Hai Zabaan"	Pritam		Alka Yagnik	
2004	Agnipankh	373	"Khamoshi Aashiqo Ki Hai Zabaan - II"	Pritam		Sunidhi Chauhan	
2004	Insaaf: The Justice	374	"Tujhe Pyar Itnai"	Nikhil–Vinay	Sameer	Anuradha Paudwal	
2004	Love in Nepal	375	"Bolo Kyaa Khayaal Hai"	Vishal–Shekhar	Sameer	Sunidhi Chauhan	
2004	Love in Nepal	376	"Mushkil Hai"	Anu Malik	Sameer		
2004	Love in Nepal	377	"Ek Anjaan Ladki"	Nikhil-Vinay	Sameer		
2004	Love in Nepal	378	"Love In Nepal"	Anu Malik	Sameer		
2004	Love in Nepal	379	"Suttaa Maar Le"	Nikhil–Vinay	Sameer	Hema Sardesai	
2004	Muskaan	380	"Woh Ho Tum"	Nikhil–Vinay	Sameer	Anuradha Paudwal	
2004	Muskaan	381	"Ishq Hasata Hai"	Nikhil–Vinay	Sameer	Anuradha Paudwal	
2004	Muskaan	382	"Nach Punjaban Nachle"	Nikhil–Vinay	Sameer	Anuradha Paudwal	
2004	Muskaan	383	"Woh Ho Tum"(Sad Version)	Nikhil–Vinay	Sameer		
2004	Muskaan	384	"Woh Ho Tum - II"	Nikhil–Vinay	Sameer	Shreya Ghoshal	
2004	Meenaxi: A Tale of Three Cities	385	"Do Kadam"	A. R. Rahman	Rahat Indori		
2004	Murder	386	"Zindagi Iss Tarah"	Anu Malik	Sayeed Quadri		
2004	Krishna Cottage	387	"Rang Rang"	Sandeep Chowta	Ajay Virmani	Alisha Chinai	
2004	Main Hoon Na	388	"Main Hoon Na"	Anu Malik	Javed Akhtar	Shreya Ghoshal	
2004	Main Hoon Na	389	"Tumse Milke Dilka Hai Jo Haal"	Anu Malik	Javed Akhtar	Aftab Sabri, Hashim Sabri	
2004	Charas	390	"Hum Chale"	Raju Singh	Javed Akhtar	Shaan	
2004	Sheen	391	"O Sanam Kuja Beri"	Nadeem–Shravan	Sameer	Sapna Mukherjee	
2004	Lakeer – Forbidden Lines	392	"Offho Jalta Hai"	A. R. Rahman	Mehboob Kotwal	Asha Bhosle	
2004	Run	393	"Chain Ho Chain Ho"	Himesh Reshammiya	Sameer	Alka Yagnik	
2004	Run	394	"Dil Mein Jo Baat"	Himesh Reshammiya	Sameer	Alka Yagnik	
2004	Run	395	"Tere Mere Pyar Ke Chand"	Himesh Reshammiya	Sameer	Alka Yagnik	
2004	Hum Tum	396	"Chakde Chakde"	Jatin–Lalit	Prasoon Joshi	Sadhana Sargam	
2004	Police Force: An Inside Story	397	"Rafta Rafta"	Anand–Milind	Sameer	Alka Yagnik	
2004	Police Force: An Inside Story	398	"Chehre Mein"	Anand–Milind	Sameer	Sadhana Sargam	
2004	Aan: Men at Work	399	"Hum Aapse"	Anu Malik	Sameer	Alka Yagnik	
2004	Aan: Men at Work	400	"Koi Pyar Na Kare"	Anu Malik	Sameer	Shreya Ghoshal	
2004	Aan: Men at Work	401	"Koi Pyar Na Kare (Male)"	Anu Malik	Sameer		
2004	Dev	402	"Tujh Sang Bandhi Dor"	Aadesh Shrivastav	Govind Nihalani		
2004	Girlfriend	403	"Thodi Tumse Shararat"	Daboo Malik	Praveen Bhardwaj	Shreya Ghoshal	
2004	Girlfriend	404	"Thodi Tumse Shararat"(Sad)	Daboo Malik	Praveen Bhardwaj		
2004	Lakshya	405	"Kandhon Se Milte Hain Kandhe"	Shankar–Ehsaan–Loy	Javed Akhtar	Shankar Mahadevan, Hariharan, Roop Kumar Rathod, Kunal Ganjawala, Vijay Prakash	
2004	Deewar	406	"Marhaba Marhaba"	Aadesh Shrivastav	Nusrat Badr	Xenia Ali	
2004	Thoda Tum Badlo Thoda Hum	407	"Sun Re Peepal"	Amar Mohile	Nida fazli	Shreya Ghoshal, Vaishali Samant, Sadhana Sargam	
2004	Thoda Tum Badlo Thoda Hum	408	"Kalam Haath Mein Hai"	Amar Mohile	Nida fazli	Shreya Ghoshal	
2004	Garv: Pride & Honour	409	"Fariyad"	Sajid–Wajid	Shabbir Ahmed		
2004	Gayab	410	"Tanha"	Ajay-Atul	Taabish Romani		
2004	Julie	411	"Aye Dil Bata"	Himesh Reshammiya	Sameer	Alka Yagnik	
2004	Julie	412	"Julie"	Himesh Reshammiya	Sameer	Jayesh Gandhi	
2004	Mujhse Shaadi Karogi	413	"Mujhse Shaadi Karogi"	Sajid–Wajid	Jalees Sherwani	Udit Narayan, Sunidhi Chauhan	
2004	Mujhse Shaadi Karogi	414	"Aaja Soniye"	Sajid–Wajid	Jalees Sherwani	Alka Yagnik	
2004	Mujhse Shaadi Karogi	415	"Lahoo Banke Aansoon"	Sajid–Wajid	Jalees Sherwani	Alka Yagnik, Shabab Sabri	
2004	Mujhse Shaadi Karogi	416	"Jeene Ke Hain Chaar Din"	Anu Malik	Sameer	Sunidhi Chauhan	
2004	Mujhse Shaadi Karogi	417	"Aaja Soniye"(Remix)	Sajid–Wajid	Jalees Sherwani	Alka Yagnik	
2004	Kaun Hai Jo Sapno Mein Aaya	418	"Agar Dil Kahe"	Nikhil–Vinay	Sameer	Shreya Ghoshal	
2004	Kaun Hai Jo Sapno Mein Aaya	419	"Bheegti Aankhon Se"	Nikhil–Vinay	Sameer	Anuradha Paudwal	
2004	Shart: The Challenge	420	"I Am An Indian"	Anu Malik	Sameer		
2004	Shart: The Challenge	421	"Hum Pyar Kar Baithe"	Anu Malik	Sameer	Alka Yagnik	
2004	Shart: The Challenge	422	"Dil To Awara Hai"	Anu Malik	Sameer	Shreya Ghoshal	
2004	Shart: The Challenge	423	"Dil Mera Badmaash"	Anu Malik	Sameer	Poornima	
2004	Shart: The Challenge	424	"Dil Mein Mere Toofan Hai"	Anu Malik	Sameer	Alka Yagnik	
2004	Fida	425	"Maine Jisko Chaha Mil Gaya"	Anu Malik	Sameer	Alisha Chinai	
2004	Phir Milenge	426	"Betab Dil Hai"	Nikhil–Vinay	Sameer	Shreya Ghoshal	
2004	Phir Milenge	427	"Betab Dil Hai"(Sad)	Nikhil–Vinay	Sameer		
2004	Rakht	428	"Hadd Se Zyaada Sanam"	Naresh Sharma	Deepak Sneh	Shreya Ghoshal	
2004	Rakht	429	"Hadd Se Zyaada Sanam"(Sad)	Naresh Sharma	Deepak Sneh		
2004	Dil Ne Jise Apna Kahaa	430	"Yeh Dil To Mila Hai"	Himesh Reshammiya	Sameer	Alka Yagnik	
2004	Madhoshi	431	"Chale Bhi Aao"	Roop Kumar Rathod	Shakeel Azmi		
2004	Tumsa Nahin Dekha: A Love Story	432	"Tanhaiyan"	Nadeem–Shravan	Sameer		
2004	Ek Se Badhkar Ek	433	"Tujhe Dekha Jab Se"	Anand Raj Anand	Dev Kohli	Abhijeet, Shweta Pandit	
2004	Shukriya: Till Death Do Us Apart	434	"Tumhe Jitna Bhulate Hain"	Himesh Reshammiya	Sameer		
2004	Shukriya: Till Death Do Us Apart	435	"Ni Soniye"	Devendra–Yogendra	Sameer	Udit Narayan, Alka Yagnik, Shreya Ghoshal	
2004	Shukriya: Till Death Do Us Apart	436	"Leti Hain Yeh Zindagi"	Devendra–Yogendra	Sameer		
2004	Kis Kis Ki Kismat	437	"Kis Kiski Kismat"	D. Imman	Farhad Wadia		
2004	Kis Kis Ki Kismat	438	"Honey Moon"	D. Imman	Farhad Wadia	Sonu Kakkar	
2004	Stop!	439	"Meri Kahani"	Vishal–Shekhar	Kumar		
2004	Veer-Zaara	440	"Do Pal"	Madan Mohan	Javed Akhtar	Lata Mangeshkar	
2004	Veer-Zaara	441	"Kyon Hawa"	Madan Mohan	Javed Akhtar	Lata Mangeshkar	
2004	Rok Sako To Rok Lo	442	"Tera Gham"	Jatin–Lalit	Prasoon Joshi	Alka Yagnik	
2004	Dil Bechara Pyaar Ka Maara	443	"Jane Kya Asar Tera Hua"	Nikhil–Vinay	Rajeshwar Mishra	Shreya Ghoshal	
2004	Ab Tumhare Hawale Watan Saathiyo	444	"Kurti Malmal Di"	Anu Malik	Sameer	Anuradha Paudwal, Sudesh Bhosle, Kailash Kher, Sneha Pant	
2004	Ab Tumhare Hawale Watan Saathiyo	445	"Mujhe Pyaar Do"	Anu Malik	Sameer	Anuradha Paudwal, Karsan Sargathia	
2004	Ab Tumhare Hawale Watan Saathiyo	446	"Chali Aa Chali Aa"	Anu Malik	Sameer	Alka Yagnik	
2004	Ab Tumhare Hawale Watan Saathiyo	447	"Ab Tumhare Hawale Watan Sathiyo"(Part I)	Anu Malik	Sameer	Udit Narayan, Alka Yagnik, Kailash Kher	
2004	Ab Tumhare Hawale Watan Saathiyo	448	"Shivji Satya Hai"	Anu Malik	Sameer	Sukhwinder Singh	
2004	Ab Tumhare Hawale Watan Saathiyo	449	"Dil Rota Hai Baar Baar"	Anu Malik	Sameer		
2004	Ab Tumhare Hawale Watan Saathiyo	450	"Ab Tumhare Hawale Watan Sathiyo"(Part II)	Anu Malik	Sameer	Udit Narayan	
2004	Dil Maange More	451	"Gustakh Dil Tere Liye"	Himesh Reshammiya	Sameer	Sunidhi Chauhan	
2004	Dil Maange More	452	"Aisa Deewana"	Himesh Reshammiya	Sameer	Alka Yagnik	
2004	Dil Maange More	453	"Shiqwa Bhi Tumse"	Himesh Reshammiya	Sameer		
2004	Dil Maange More	454	"Shiqwa Bhi Tumse"(Sad)	Himesh Reshammiya	Sameer		
2005	Elaan	455	"Andarlu Mandarlu"	Anu Malik	Sameer	Anu Malik, Shreya Ghoshal, Sunidhi Chauhan	
2005	Elaan	456	"Anderlu Manderlu"(Remix)	Anu Malik	Sameer	Anu Malik, Shreya Ghoshal, Sunidhi Chauhan	
2005	Insan	457	"Khwahish"	Himesh Reshammiya	Sameer	Alka Yagnik	
2005	Blackmail	458	"Jaana Nahin Tha"	Himesh Reshammiya	Sameer	Alka Yagnik	
2005	Shabd	459	"Khoya Khoya"	Vishal–Shekhar	Vishal Dadlani	Sunidhi Chauhan	
2005	Shabd	460	"Bolo To"	Vishal–Shekhar	Vishal Dadlani	Shreya Ghoshal	
2005	Chaahat – Ek Nasha	461	"Ishq Ki Raat"	Anand Raj Anand	Praveen Bharadwaj	Sunidhi Chauhan, Shreya Ghoshal	
2005	Chehraa	462	"Teri Bahon Mein"	Ram Sampath	Sameer	Shreya Ghoshal	
2005	Bewafaa	463	"Ek Bewafaa Hai"	Nadeem–Shravan	Sameer		
2005	Fun – Can Be Dangerous Sometimes	464	"Tum Paas Ho"	Sanjeev–Darshan	Nasir Faraaz		
2005	Socha Na Tha	465	"Yaara Rab"	Sandesh Shandilya	Irshad Kamil	Sanjivani	
2005	Socha Na Tha	466	"Abhi Abhi"	Sandesh Shandilya	Subrat Sinha	Kunal Ganjawala, Sunidhi Chauhan	
2005	Socha Na Tha	467	"Zindagi"	Sandesh Shandilya	Irshad Kamil	Sunidhi Chauhan, Lalit Bhushan	
2005	Zameer: The Fire Within	468	"Tum Kitne Bechain Ho"	Nikhil–Vinay	Sameer	Anuradha Paudwal	
2005	Karam	469	"Koi Aisa Alam"	Vishal–Shekhar	Dev Kohli	Mahalakshmi Iyer	
2005	Tango Charlie	470	"Ae Aasmaan"	Anand Raj Anand	Anand Raj Anand		
2005	Tango Charlie	471	"Dheere Dheere"	Anand Raj Anand	Anand Raj Anand	Shreya Ghoshal	
2005	Lucky: No Time for Love	472	"Sun Zara"	Adnan Sami	Sameer		
2005	Lucky: No Time for Love	473	"Chori Chori"	Adnan Sami	Sameer	Alka Yagnik	
2005	Lucky: No Time for Love	474	"Hum Deewane"	Adnan Sami	Sameer	Anuradha Paudwal	
2005	Kuchh Meetha Ho Jaye	475	"Kuchh Meetha Ho Jaye"	Himesh Reshammiya	Sameer	Shreya Ghoshal, Jayesh Gandhi	
2005	Kuchh Meetha Ho Jaye	476	"Lagne Lage Ho"	Himesh Reshammiya	Sameer	Alka Yagnik	
2005	Mumbai Xpress	477	"Aila Re"	Illayaraja	Dev Kohli	K.K., Shaan, Sunidhi Chahuhan, Shreya Ghoshal	Bilingual film
2005	Mumbai Xpress	478	"Pyaar Chahiye"	Illayaraja	Dev Kohli	Shaan, Shreya Ghoshal	Bilingual film
2005	Mumbai Xpress	479	"Bander Ki Dug Dugi"	Illayaraja	Dev Kohli	K.K., Shaan, Sunidhi Chahuhan	Bilingual film
2005	Mumbai Xpress	480	"Pyaar Chahiye"	Illayaraja	Dev Kohli	Shaan	Bilingual film
2005	Waqt: The Race Against Time	481	"Apne Jahanke"	Anu Malik	Aatish Kapadia	Adnan Sami	
2005	Waqt: The Race Against Time	482	"Miraksam"	Anu Malik	Sameer	Sudesh Bhosle, Sunidhi Chauhan, Mahalakshmi Iyer	
2005	Waqt: The Race Against Time	483	"Chhup Ja Chuup Ja"	Anu Malik	Sameer	Sunidhi Chauhan	
2005	Kaal	484	"Tauba Tauba"	Salim–Sulaiman	Shabbir Ahmed	Kunal Ganjawala, Sunidhi Chauhan, Richa Sharma	
2005	Kaal	485	"Nassa Nassa"	Anand Raj Anand	Anand Raj Anand	Sunidhi Chauhan	
2005	Main Aisa Hi Hoon	486	"Raat Hai Soyi Soyi"	Himesh Reshammiya	Sameer		
2005	Main Aisa Hi Hoon	487	"Papa Mere Papa"	Himesh Reshammiya	Sameer	Shreya Ghoshal, Baby Aparna	
2005	Main Aisa Hi Hoon	488	"Raat Hai Soyi Soyi"(Adlip)	Himesh Reshammiya	Sameer		
2005	Main Aisa Hi Hoon	489	"Papa Mere Papa"(Part I)	Himesh Reshammiya	Sameer	Baby Aparna	
2005	Bunty Aur Babli	490	"Chup Chup Ke"	Shankar–Ehsaan–Loy	Gulzar	Mahalakshmi Iyer	
2005	Parineeta	491	"Piyu Bole"	Shantanu Moitra	Swanand Kirkire	Shreya Ghoshal	
2005	Parineeta	492	"Kasto Mazza"	Shantanu Moitra	Swanand Kirkire	Shreya Ghoshal	
2005	Parineeta	493	"Soona Man Ka Aangan"	Shantanu Moitra	Swanand Kirkire	Shreya Ghoshal	
2005	Parineeta	494	"Hui Main Parineeta"	Shantanu Moitra	Swanand Kirkire	Shreya Ghoshal	
2005	Silsiilay	495	"Jab Jab Dil Mile"	Himesh Reshammiya	Sameer		
2005	Silsiilay	496	"Ahista Ahista"	Himesh Reshammiya	Sameer	Shreya Ghoshal, Jayesh Gandhi	
2005	Paheli	497	"Dheere Jalna"	M. M. Kreem	Gulzar	Shreya Ghoshal, Madhushree, Bela Shende, Kalapini Komakali	
2005	Paheli	498	"Kangna Re"	M. M. Kreem	Gulzar	Shreya Ghoshal	
2005	Paheli	499	"Laaga Re Jal Laaga"	M. M. Kreem	Gulzar	M. M. Kreem, Shruti Sadolikar	
2005	Yakeen	500	"Tu Hi"	Himesh Reshammiya	Sameer	Shreya Ghoshal	
2005	Yakeen	501	"Chehra Tera"	Himesh Reshammiya	Sameer	Alka Yagnik	
2005	Fareb	502	"Shaam Aayegi"	Anu Malik	Sayeed Quadri		
2005	Dus	503	"Chham Se"	Vishal–Shekhar	Panchhi Jalonvi	Shaan, Babul Supriyo, Sunidhi Chauhan, Sapna Mukherjee	
2005	Dus	504	"Samne Aati Ho"	Vishal–Shekhar	Panchhi Jalonvi	Sunidhi Chauhan	
2005	Maine Pyaar Kyun Kiya?	505	"Just Chill"	Himesh Reshammiya	Sameer	Jayesh Gandhi, Amrita Kak	
2005	Barsaat	506	"Pyaar Aaya"	Nadeem–Shravan	Sameer	Alka Yagnik	
2005	No Entry	507	"No Entry - Ishq Ki Galli Mein"	Anu Malik	Sameer	Alisha Chinai	
2005	No Entry	508	"Just Love Me - Main Akela"	Anu Malik	Sameer		
2005	Aashiq Banaya Aapne	509	"Dillagi Mein Jo Beet Jaaye"	Himesh Reshammiya	Sameer	Shaan, Himesh Reshammiya, Jayesh Gandhi, Sunidhi Chauhan, Vasundhara	
2005	Pyaar Mein Twist	510	"Ladki Gori Ya Kaali"	Jatin–Lalit	Sameer	Sunidhi Chauhan	
2005	Ramji Londonwaley	511	"Dhooan Dhooan"	Vishal Bhardwaj	Munna Dhiman		
2005	Salaam Namaste	512	"Tu Jahan"	Vishal–Shekhar	Jaideep Sahni	Mahalakshmi Iyer	
2005	Chocolate	513	"Halka Halka Sa Yeh Sama"	Pritam	Mayur Puri	Sunidhi Chauhan	
2005	Chocolate	514	"Halka Halka Sa Yeh Sama"(Remix)	Pritam	Mayur Puri	Sunidhi Chauhan	
2005	James	515	"Suraj Ki Kirno"	Nitin Raikwar	Nitin Raikwar	Shweta Pandit	
2005	James	516	"Jaan Jai"	Nitin Raikwar	Nitin Raikwar	Shreya Ghoshal	
2005	James	517	"Sinduri Aasman"	Bapi–Tutul	Sandeep Nath	Shweta Pandit	
2005	Dil Jo Bhi Kahey...	518	"Kitni Narmi Se"	Shankar–Ehsaan–Loy	Javed Akhtar		
2005	Main, Meri Patni Aur Woh	519	"Doob Jaana Re"	Rocky Khanna]	Rocky Khanna	Shreya Ghoshal	
2005	Koi Aap Sa	520	"Baandh Mere Pairon Mein"	Himesh Reshammiya	Sameer	Sunidhi Chauhan	
2005	Koi Aap Sa	521	"Tere Dil Ka Rishta"	Himesh Reshammiya	Sameer		
2005	Koi Aap Sa	522	"Koi Aap Sa"	Himesh Reshammiya	Sameer	Alka Yagnik	
2005	Koi Aap Sa	523	"Baandh Mere Pairon Mein"(Remix)	Himesh Reshammiya	Sameer	Sunidhi Chauhan, Jayesh Gandhi	
2005	Garam Masala	524	"Ada"	Pritam	Sameer		
2005	Garam Masala	525	"Falak Dekhun"	Pritam	Sameer	Mayur Puri	
2005	Garam Masala	526	"Ada"(Remix)	Pritam	Sameer		
2005	Shaadi No. 1	527	"Jitne Channel TV Ke"	Anu Malik	Sameer	Krishna Beura	
2005	Netaji Subhas Chandra Bose: The Forgotten Hero	528	"Ekla Chalo"	A. R. Rahman	Javed Akhtar		
2005	Netaji Subhas Chandra Bose: The Forgotten Hero	529	"Des Ki Mitti"	A. R. Rahman	Javed Akhtar		
2005	Ek Khiladi Ek Haseena	530	"Jal Jal Ke Dhuan"	Pritam	Amitabh Verma		
2005	Ek Khiladi Ek Haseena	531	"Yaaron"	Pritam	Mayur Puri	Shaan	
2005	Ek Khiladi Ek Haseena	532	"Jal Jal Ke Dhuan"(Remix)	Pritam	Amitabh Verma		
2005	Sitam	533	"Pyar Tumko Hi Kiya Hai"	Nikhil–Vinay	Kamal	Shreya Ghoshal	
2005	Sitam	534	"Sharmila Ho Sharmila"	Nikhil–Vinay	Kamal	Shreya Ghoshal	
2005	Sitam	535	"Sharmila Ho Sharmila"(Sad)	Nikhil–Vinay	Kamal		
2005	Mr Ya Miss	536	"Fakr Hai Aadmi"	Nitin Raikwar	Nitin Raikwar		
2005	Mr Ya Miss	537	"Kanha Kanha"	Ronkini Gupta	Satchik Puranik		
2005	Dosti: Friends Forever	538	"Yeh Dosti"	Nadeem–Shravan	Sameer	Udit Narayan	
2005	Dosti: Friends Forever	539	"Aur Tum Aaye"	Nadeem–Shravan	Sameer	Alka Yagnik	
2005	Dosti: Friends Forever	540	"Yaar Di Shaadi"	Nadeem–Shravan	Sameer	Abhijeet, Alka Yagnik, Sarika Kapoor	
2005	Vaah! Life Ho Toh Aisi!	541	"Pyaar Mein Tere"	Himesh Reshammiya	Sameer	Shreya Ghoshal	
2005	Hum Dum	542	Humdum Title track	Sujeet–Rajesh		Shreya Ghoshal	
2005	Hum Dum	543	"Tanhaiya" (Male Version)	Sujeet–Rajesh			
2006	Jawani Diwani: A Youthful Joyride	542	"Dil Deewana"	Sajid–Wajid	Shabbir Ahmed	Sowmya Raoh	
2006	Mere Jeevan Saathi	543	"Mere Jeevan Saathi"	Nadeem–Shravan	Sameer		
2006	Mere Jeevan Saathi	544	"Ek Masoom Sa"	Nadeem–Shravan	Sameer	Sadhana Sargam	
2006	Aisa Kyon Hota Hai?	545	"Oh Yara Dildara"	Tauseef Akhtar	Payam Sayeedi	Shreya Ghoshal	
2006	Teesri Aankh: The Hidden Camera	546	"Assi Teri Gul Karni"	Harry Anand	Sameer	Suzanne D'Mello	
2006	Teesri Aankh: The Hidden Camera	547	"Titliyan Titliyan"	Harry Anand	Sameer	Shweta Pandit	
2006	Teesri Aankh: The Hidden Camera	548	"Assi Teri Gul Karni"(Remix)	Harry Anand	Sameer	Suzanne D'Mello	
2006	Teesri Aankh: The Hidden Camera	549	"Titliyan Titliyan"(Remix)	Harry Anand	Sameer	Shweta Pandit	
2006	Umar	550	"Duniyawalon Ko Nahi Kuch Bhi"	Shamir Tandon	Shailendra	Manna Dey, Kavita Krishnamurthi, Shabab Sabri	
2006	Souten: The Other Woman	551	"Mohabbat Ho Gayee"	Anand–Milind	Praveen Bharadwaj	Alka Yagnik	
2006	Banaras	552	"Ishq Mein Dilko"(I)	Himesh Reshammiya	Sameer	Sunidhi Chauhan	
2006	Banaras	553	"Rang Daalo"	Himesh Reshammiya	Sameer	Shreya Ghoshal	
2006	Banaras	554	"Rang Daalo"(Folk)	Himesh Reshammiya	Sameer	Sailesh	
2006	Banaras	555	"Ishq Mein Dilko"(II)	Himesh Reshammiya	Sameer	Sunidhi Chauhan	
2006	Saawan... The Love Season	556	"Tu Mila De"	Sajid–Wajid	Saawan Kumar		
2006	Shaadi Se Pehle	557	"Ankhiyon Se Gal Kar Gayi"	Himesh Reshammiya	Sameer	Sukhwinder Singh, Sunidhi Chauhan	
2006	Shaadi Se Pehle	558	"Ankhiyon Se Gal Kar Gayi"(Remix)	Himesh Reshammiya	Sameer	Sukhwinder Singh, Sunidhi Chauhan	
2006	Humko Deewana Kar Gaye	559	"Humko Deewana Kar Gaye"	Anu Malik	Sameer	Tulsi Kumar	
2006	Humko Deewana Kar Gaye	560	"For Your Eyes Only"	Anu Malik	Sameer	Krishna, Nandini	
2006	Humko Deewana Kar Gaye	561	"Bhula Denge Tum Ko Sanam"	Anu Malik	Sameer		
2006	Humko Deewana Kar Gaye	562	"Bhula Denge Tum Ko Sanam"(Remix)	Anu Malik	Sameer		
2006	Humko Deewana Kar Gaye	563	"Humko Deewana Kar Gaye"(Sad)	Anu Malik	Sameer		
2006	Pyare Mohan	564	"Day By Day Mera Pyar"	Anu Malik	Sameer		
2006	Tom, Dick, and Harry	565	"Yeu Kashi Kashi Mi"	Himesh Reshammiya	Sameer	Richa Sharma	
2006	Ankahee	566	"Ek Pal Ke Liye"	Pritam	Amitabh Verma		
2006	Fanaa	567	"Mere Haath Main"	Jatin–Lalit	Prasoon Joshi	Sunidhi Chauhan	
2006	Fanaa	568	"Dekho Na"	Jatin–Lalit	Prasoon Joshi	Sunidhi Chauhan	
2006	Love Ke Chakkar Mein	569	"Fata Fat Pyar Ho Gaya"	Anand Raj Anand	Praveen Bhardwaj	Sunidhi Chauhan	
2006	Love Ke Chakkar Mein	570	"Ek Kamre Mein Hum Tum"	Anand Raj Anand	Dev Kohli	Sunidhi Chauhan	
2006	Chup Chup Ke	571	"Dil Vich Lagya"	Himesh Reshammiya	Sameer	Kunal Ganjawala, Akriti Kakkar	
2006	Chup Chup Ke	572	"Mausam Hai Bada Qatil"	Himesh Reshammiya	Sameer		
2006	Chup Chup Ke	573	"Dil Vich Lagya"(Remix)	Himesh Reshammiya	Sameer	Kunal Ganjawala, Akriti Kakkar	
2006	Phir Hera Pheri	574	"Phir Hera Pheri"	Himesh Reshammiya	Sameer	Shaan, Rakesh Upadhyay	
2006	Phir Hera Pheri	575	"Phir Hera Pheri"(Remix)	Himesh Reshammiya		Shaan, Rakesh Upadhyay	
2006	Krrish	576	"Pyaar Ki Ek Kahaani"	Rajesh Roshan	Ibrahim Ashk	Shreya Ghoshal	
2006	Krrish	577	"Koi Tumsa Nahin"	Rajesh Roshan	Nasir Faraaz	Shreya Ghoshal	
2006	Krrish	578	"Big Band Mix"	Rajesh Roshan	Nasir Faraaz	Shreya Ghoshal	
2006	Anthony Kaun Hai?	579	"Bhangra Paale"	Himesh Reshammiya	Sameer	Saru Maini	
2006	Shaadi Karke Phas Gaya Yaar	580	"Deewane Dil Ko Jaane Na"	Sajid–Wajid	Shabbir Ahmed	Sunidhi Chauhan	
2006	Shaadi Karke Phas Gaya Yaar	581	"Dil Yeh Bahalta Nahin"	Daboo Malik	Salim Bijnori	Sunidhi Chauhan	
2006	Shaadi Karke Phas Gaya Yaar	582	"Shaadi Kar Ke Phas Gaya"	Sajid–Wajid	Jalees Sherwani	Sunidhi Chauhan	
2006	Kabhi Alvida Naa Kehna	583	"Kabhi Alvida Naa Kehna"	Shankar–Ehsaan–Loy	Javed Akhtar	Alka Yagnik	
2006	Kabhi Alvida Naa Kehna	584	"Tumhi Dekho Naa"	Shankar–Ehsaan–Loy	Javed Akhtar	Alka Yagnik	
2006	Sandwich	585	"Hum Tum"	Sandeep Chowta	Taabish Romani	Asha Bhosle	
2006	Sandwich	586	"Bahut Chalu Hai Saala"	Sandeep Chowta	Farhad	Hema Sardesai, Govinda	
2006	Sandwich	587	"Zahreela Gussa"	Sandeep Chowta	Taabish Romani		
2006	Lage Raho Munna Bhai	588	"Pal Pal... Har Pal"	Shantanu Moitra	Swanand Kirkire	Shreya Ghoshal	
2006	Lage Raho Munna Bhai	589	"Bande Mein Tha Dum... Vande Mataram"	Shantanu Moitra	Swanand Kirkire	Shreya Ghoshal, Pranab Kumar Biswas	
2006	Naksha	590	"U&I"	Pritam	Mayur Puri		
2006	Naksha	591	"Jat Yamla"	Pritam	Sameer	Shreya Ghoshal	
2006	Naksha	592	"Jat Yamla"(Remix)	Pritam	Sameer	Shreya Ghoshal	
2006	Jai Santoshi Maa	593	"Maa Santoshi Maa Jai Maa"	Anu Malik	Swanand Kirkire	Alka Yagnik	
2006	Jai Santoshi Maa	594	"Suno Suno Kaho Kaho"	Anu Malik	Swanand Kirkire	Alka Yagnik	
2006	Utthaan	595	"Yeh Kaisa Utthaan Hai"	Kumar Sanu	Sudhakar Sharma		
2006	Iqraar by Chance	596	"Iqraar By Chance"	Sandesh Shandilya	Shabbir Ahmed	Sunidhi Chauhan	
2006	Don: The Chase Begins Again	597	"Aaj Ki Raat"	Shankar–Ehsaan–Loy	Javed Akhtar	Alisha Chinai, Mahalakshmi Iyer	
2006	Jaan-E-Mann	598	"Humko Maloom Hai"	Anu Malik	Gulzar	Sadhana Sargam	
2006	Jaan-E-Mann	599	"Jaane Ke Jaane Na"	Anu Malik	Gulzar	Sukhwinder Singh, Krishna	
2006	Jaan-E-Mann	600	"Ajnabi Shehar"	Anu Malik	Gulzar		
2006	Jaan-E-Mann	601	"Sau Dard"	Anu Malik	Gulzar	Suzanne	
2006	Jaan-E-Mann	602	"Jaane Ke Jaane Na"(Club Mix)	Anu Malik	Gulzar	Sukhwinder Singh, Krishna	
2006	Jaan-E-Mann	603	"Sau Dard"(Groove mix)	Anu Malik	Gulzar		
2006	Umrao Jaan	604	"Bekha Diya Hamein"	Anu Malik	Javed Akhtar	Alka Yagnik	
2006	Dhoom 2	605	"My Name Is Ali"	Pritam	Sameer	Bipasha Basu	
2006	Baabul	606	"Be On Come On"	Aadesh Shrivastava	Sameer	Amitabh Bachchan, Vishal Dadlani, Aadesh Shrivastava, Ranjit Barot	
2006	Baabul	607	"Keh Raha Hai"	Aadesh Shrivastava	Sameer	Shreya Ghoshal	
2006	Baabul	608	"Baawri Piya Ki"	Aadesh Shrivastava	Sameer		
2006	Baabul	609	"Come On Come On"(Remix)	Aadesh Shrivastava	Sameer	Amitabh Bachchan, Vishal Dadlani, Aadesh Shrivastava, Ranjit Barot	
2006	Baabul	610	"Vaada Raha"	Aadesh Shrivastava	Sameer		
2006	Aryan	611	"Janeman"	Anand Raj Anand	Anand Raj Anand	Shreya Ghoshal	
2007	Salaam-e-Ishq	612	"Salaam-E-Ishq"	Shankar–Ehsaan–Loy	Sameer	Shreya Ghoshal, Kunal Ganjawala, Sadhana Sargam, Shankar Mahadevan	
2007	Salaam-e-Ishq	613	"Tenu Leke"	Shankar–Ehsaan–Loy	Sameer	Mahalakshmi Iyer	
2007	Eklavya: The Royal Guard	614	"Jaanu Na"(The Quest)	Shantanu Moitra	Swanand Kirkire	Swanand Kirkire	
2007	Nehlle Pe Dehlla	615	"Husn Husn"	Anand Raj Anand	Dev Kohli	Shaan, Jaspinder Narula	
2007	Just Married	616	"Jagte Raho"	Pritam	Gulzar		
2007	Delhii Heights	617	"Kitni Der Tak"	Rabbi Shergill	Rabbi Shergill	Rabbi Shergill	
2007	Say Salaam India	618	"Tana Re Bana Re"	Gaurav Dayal	Gauhar Raza		
2007	Say Salaam India	619	"Tana Re Bana Re"(Remix)	Gaurav Dayal	Gauhar Raza		
2007	Kya Love Story Hai	620	"Gumsum Hai Dil Mera"	Pritam	Shabbir Ahmed		
2007	Ta Ra Rum Pum	621	"Nachle Ve"	Vishal–Shekhar	Javed Akhtar	Sowmya Raoh	
2007	Apne	622	"Apne"	Himesh Reshammiya	Sameer	Jayesh Gandhi, Jaspinder Narula	
2007	Apne	623	"Tere Sang"	Himesh Reshammiya	Sameer	Jaspinder Narula	
2007	Naqaab	624	"Aye Dil Pagal Mere"(Remix)	Pritam	Sameer		
2007	Naqaab	625	"Aye Dil Pagal Mere"	Pritam	Sameer		
2007	Partner	626	"Dupatta Tera Nau Rang Da"	Sajid–Wajid	Shabbir Ahmed	Kunal Ganjawala, Shreya Ghoshal, Suzi Q	
2007	Partner	627	"Maria Maria"	Sajid–Wajid	Jalees Sherwani	Sajid, Sunidhi Chauhan, Naresh Iyer	
2007	Heyy Babyy	628	"Dholna"	Shankar–Ehsaan–Loy	Sameer	Shreya Ghoshal	
2007	Heyy Babyy	629	"Meri Duniya Tu Hi Re"	Shankar–Ehsaan–Loy	Sameer	Shankar Mahadevan, Shaan	
2007	Heyy Babyy	630	"Dholna"(Love Is In The Air Remix)	Shankar–Ehsaan–Loy	Sameer	Shreya Ghoshal	
2007	Nanhe Jaisalmer	631	"Ai Mere Nanhe Yaar"	Himesh Reshammiya	Sameer		
2007	Laaga Chunari Mein Daag	632	"Kachchi Kaliyaan"	Shantanu Moitra	Swanand Kirkire	KK, Sunidhi Chauhan, Shreya Ghoshal	
2007	Speed	633	"Loving You"	Pritam	Mayur Puri	Antara Mitra	
2007	Jab We Met	634	"Nagada Nagada"	Pritam	Irshad Kamil	Javed Ali	
2007	Om Shanti Om	635	"Main Agar Kahoon"	Vishal–Shekhar	Javed Akhtar	Shreya Ghoshal	
2007	Aaja Nachle	636	"Ishq Hua"	Salim–Sulaiman	Jaideep Sahni	Shreya Ghoshal	
2007	Aaja Nachle	637	"Is Pal"	Salim–Sulaiman	Piyush Mishra	Shreya Ghoshal	
2007	Aaja Nachle	638	"Koi Patthar Se Na Maare"	Salim–Sulaiman	Piyush Mishra	Sunidhi Chauhan, Shreya Ghoshal	
2007	Khoya Khoya Chand	639	"Yeh Nigahein"	Shantanu Moitra	Swanand Kirkire	Antara Chowdhury	
2007	Khoya Khoya Chand	640	"O Re Paakhi"	Shantanu Moitra	Swanand Kirkire		
2007	Khoya Khoya Chand	641	"Thirak Thirak"	Shantanu Moitra	Swanand Kirkire	Shreya Ghoshal	
2007	Fear		"Tu Hai Ishq"	Himesh Reshammiya	Sameer Anjaan	Udit Narayan, Alka Yagnik	
2008	Bombay to Bangkok	642	"Dil Ka Haal Sune Dilwala"	Pritam	Shabbir Ahmed	Sunidhi Chauhan	
2008	Tulsi	643	"Aasmann Pe Rab Hoga"	Nikhil–Vinay			
2008	Tulsi	644	"Toote Gharonda Bikre Tinke"	Nikhil–Vinay			
2008	Jodhaa Akbar	645	"In Lamhon Ke Daaman Mein"	A. R. Rahman	Javed Akhtar	Madhushree	
2008	Bhram	646	"Jaane Kyun Tanha Ho Gaye"	Pritam	Irshad Kamil		
2008	Mr. Black Mr. White	647	"Behna Ki Shaadi"	Lalit Pandit	Tauseef Akhtar	Shailender Singh	
2008	Haal-e-Dil	648	"Jeeta Hoon"	Anand Raj Anand	Sameer	Pamela Jain	
2008	Haal-e-Dil	649	"Rang"	Raghav Sachar	Aditya Dhar		
2008	Haal-e-Dil	650	"Rani"	Anand Raj Anand	Sameer		
2008	Thodi Life Thoda Magic	651	"Thoda Sa Gum Ho Thodi Khushi Ho"	Vinay Tiwari	Sunil Jogi		
2008	Thodi Life Thoda Magic	652	"Thoda Sa Gum Ho Thodi Khushi Ho"(Sad)	Vinay Tiwari	Sunil Jogi		
2008	Thodi Life Thoda Magic	653	"Thoda Sa Gum Ho Thodi Khushi Ho"(Remix)	Vinay Tiwari	Sunil Jogi		
2008	Thodi Life Thoda Magic	654	"Yeh Mast Hawa Jo"	Vinay Tiwari	Irshad Kamil	Shreya Ghoshal	
2008	Mehbooba	655	"Achcha To Ab Main Chalta Hoon"	Ismail Darbar	Anand Bakshi		
2008	Mehbooba	656	"Kuch Kar Lo"	Ismail Darbar	Anand Bakshi		
2008	Mehbooba	657	"Deewana"	Ismail Darbar	Anand Bakshi	Sukhwinder Singh, Aslam Sabri	
2008	Kismat Konnection	658	"Soniye Ve"(Dhak Dhak Dhak)	Pritam	Shabbir Ahmed	Sunidhi Chauhan	
2008	Kismat Konnection	659	"Soniye Ve"(Dhak Dhak Dhak)Remix	Pritam	Shabbir Ahmed	Sunidhi Chauhan	
2008	God Tussi Great Ho	660	"God Tussi Great Ho"	Sajid–Wajid	Shabbir Ahmed	Shankar Mahadevan	
2008	God Tussi Great Ho	661	"God Tussi Great Ho"(Remix)	Sajid–Wajid	Shabbir Ahmed	Shankar Mahadevan	
2008	Maan Gaye Mughal-e-Azam	662	"Ishqaiyaan"	Anu Malik	Sanjay Chhel	Sunidhi Chauhan, Aftab Hashim Sabri	
2008	Maan Gaye Mughal-e-Azam	663	"Ishqaiyaan"(Remix)	Anu Malik	Sanjay Chhel	Alisha Chinai	
2008	Hello	664	"Rab Ka Banda"	Sajid–Wajid	Jalees Sherwani	Zubeen Garg, Sunidhi Chauhan	
2008	Heroes	665	"Mannata"	Sajid–Wajid	Jalees Sherwani	Kavita Krishnamurthy	
2008	Dasvidaniya	666	"Muskura"	Kailash Kher, Naresh, Paresh	Kailash Kher	Kailash Kher	
2008	Yuvvraaj	667	"Shanno Shanno"	A. R. Rahman	Gulzar	Srinivas, Karthik, Timmy, Sunaina, Vivienne Pocha, Tina, Blaaze	
2008	Yuvvraaj	668	"Mastam Mastam"	A. R. Rahman	Gulzar	Alka Yagnik, Naresh, Benny	
2008	Yuvvraaj	669	"Dil Ka Rishta"	A. R. Rahman	Gulzar	Roop Kumar Rathod, A. R. Rahman	Backing vocals: Clinton, Suzanne, Vivienne Pocha, Naresh, Benny, Blaaze
2008	Rab Ne Bana Di Jodi	670	"Phir Milenge Chalte Chalte"	Salim–Sulaiman	Jaideep Sahni		
2008	Ghajini	671	"Guzaarish"	A.R. Rahman	Prasoon Joshi	Javed Ali	
2008	Rang Rasiya	672	"O Kamini"	Sandesh Shandilya	Manoj Muntashir		
2008	Jumbo	673	"Chayee Madhoshiyan"	Ram Sampath	Israr Ansari	Sona Mohapatra	
2008	Jumbo	674	"Chayee Madhoshiyan"(Remix)	Ram Sampath	Israr Ansari	Sona Mohapatra	
2009	Raaz: The Mystery Continues	675	"Soniyo"	Raju Singh	Kumaar	Shreya Ghoshal, Neeraj Shridhar	
2009	Victory	676	"Mazaa Aa Gaya"	Anu Malik	Syed Gulrez	Suresh Wadkar, Sudesh Bhonsle, Altaf Raja, Sumitra Iyyer, Mahalaxmi Iyer	
2009	Kisse Pyaar Karoon	677	"Aahoon Aahoon"	Daboo Malik	Praveen Bharadwaj	Sunidhi Chauhan	
2009	Dhoondte Reh Jaaoge	678	"Dhoondte Reh Jaaoge"	Sajid–Wajid			
2009	Ek Se Bure Do	679	"Ek Se Bure Do"	Ravi Pawar	Panchhi Jalonvi	Vinod Rathod	
2009	Kal Kissne Dekha	680	"Alam Guzarne Ko"	Sajid–Wajid	Sameer	Suzie Q	
2009	Kal Kissne Dekha	681	"Soniye Billori"	Sajid–Wajid	Sameer	Suzie Q	
2009	Kal Kissne Dekha	682	"Soniye Billori"(Club Mix)	Sajid–Wajid	Sameer	Suzie Q	
2009	Paying Guests	683	"Ya Rabul Aalameen"	Sajid–Wajid	Jalees Sherwani	Amrita Kak, Earl D'Souza	
2009	Short Kut	684	"Kal Nau Baje"	Shankar–Ehsaan–Loy	Javed Akhtar	Alka Yagnik	
2009	Dil Bole Hadippa!	685	"Ishq Hi Hai Rab"	Pritam	Jaideep Sahni	Shreya Ghoshal, Mukhtar Sahota	
2009	Phir Kabhi	686	"Dildara Dildara"	Shantanu Moitra		Sunidhi Chauhan	
2009	Do Knot Disturb	687	"Zulfein Khol Khaal Me"	Nadeem–Shravan	Sameer	Anuradha Sriram	
2009	Blue	688	"Chiggy Wiggy"	A. R. Rahman	Abbas Tyrewala	Kylie Minogue, Suzanne D'Mello	
2009	Blue	689	"Rehnuma"	A. R. Rahman	Abbas Tyrewala	Shreya Ghoshal	
2009	Main Aurr Mrs Khanna	690	"Don't Say Alvida"	Sajid–Wajid	Junaid Wasi	Shreya Ghoshal, Suzanne D'Mello	
2009	Main Aurr Mrs Khanna	691	"Don't Say Alvida"(Remix)	Sajid–Wajid	Junaid Wasi	Shreya Ghoshal, Suzanne D'Mello	
2009	Kurbaan	692	"Shukran Allah"	Salim–Sulaiman	Niranjan Iyengar	Shreya Ghoshal, Salim Merchant	
2009	3 Idiots	693	"Aal Izz Well"	Shantanu Moitra	Swanand Kirkire	Swanand Kirkire, Shana	
2009	3 Idiots	694	"Zoobi Doobi"	Shantanu Moitra	Swanand Kirkire	Shreya Ghoshal	
2009	3 Idiots	695	"Aal Izz Well"(Remix)	Shantanu Moitra	Swanand Kirkire	Swanand Kirkire, Shana	
2009	3 Idiots	696	"Jaane Nahin Denge Tujhe"	Shantanu Moitra	Swanand Kirkire		
2009	3 Idiots	697	"Zoobi Doobi"(Remix)	Shantanu Moitra	Swanand Kirkire	Shreya Ghoshal	

=== 2010s ===
Year	Film	#	Song	Composer(s)	Lyricist(s)	Co-artist(s)
2010	Dulha Mil Gaya	698	"Tu Jo Jaan Le"	Lalit Pandit	Mudassar Aziz	
2010	Veer	699	"Taali"	Sajid–Wajid	Gulzar	Sukhwinder Singh, Wajid, Neuman Pinto
2010	Veer	700	"Meherbaniyan"	Sajid–Wajid	Gulzar	
2010	Striker	701	"Cham Cham"	Shailendra Barve	Jeetendra Joshi	
2010	Toh Baat Pakki!	702	"Phir Se"	Pritam	Sayeed Quadri	
2010	Toh Baat Pakki!	701	"Phir Se" (Remix)	Pritam	Sayeed Quadri	
2010	Prem Kaa Game	702	"I Wanna Fall...Fall In Love"	Raju Singh	Kiran Kotrial	Sunidhi Chauhan
2010	Prem Kaa Game	703	"Zabardast"	Raju Singh	Kiran Kotrial	Vishal Dadlani, Sunidhi Chauhan
2010	Prem Kaa Game	704	"Magar Kuch To Hai"	Raju Singh	Kiran Kotrial	Shreya Ghoshal
2010	Jaane Kahan Se Aayi Hai	705	"Nacha Main"	Sajid–Wajid	Sameer	Sowmya Raoh
2010	Jaane Kahan Se Aayi Hai	706	"Koi Rok Bhi Lo"	Sajid–Wajid	Sameer	Sunidhi Chauhan
2010	Apartment	707	"Yeh Hai Mumbai"	Bappi Lahiri	Syed Gulrez	
2010	Apartment	708	"Yeh Hai Mumbai" (Remix)	Bappi Lahiri		
2010	Raajneeti	709	"Dhan Dhan Dharti Reprise" (Call of the Soil)	Wayne Sharpe	Gulzar	
2010	Milenge Milenge	710	"Tum Chain Ho"	Himesh Reshammiya	Sameer	Alka Yagnik, Suzanne D'Mello
2010	We Are Family	711	"Hamesha & Forever"	Shankar–Ehsaan–Loy	Irshad Kamil	Shreya Ghoshal
2010	Dabangg	712	"Chori Kiya Re Jiya"	Sajid–Wajid	Jalees Sherwani	Shreya Ghoshal
2010	Jhootha Hi Sahi	713	"Do Nishaniyan"	A. R. Rahman	Abbas Tyrewala	
2010	Jhootha Hi Sahi	714	"Do Nishaniyan" (Heartbreak Reprise)	A. R. Rahman	Abbas Tyrewala	
2010	A Flat	715	"Dil Kashi"	Bappi Lahiri	Virag Mishra	Tulsi Kumar, Raja Hasan, Aditi Singh Sharma
2010	A Flat	716	"Dil Kashi"	Bappi Lahiri	Virag Mishra	Raja Hasan, Aditi Singh Sharma
2010	Toonpur Ka Superrhero	717	"Rubdoot"	Anu Malik	Mumzy	Sudesh Bhonsle, Altaf Raja, Ajay Devgan
2010	Kandahar	718	"Aye Janani"	Shamir Tandon	Sandeep Nath	
2010	Tees Maar Khan	719	"Tees Maar Khan"	Shirish Kunder	Shirish Kunder	
2010	Tees Maar Khan	720	"Tees Maar Khan" (Remix)	Shirish Kunder	Shirish Kunder	
2010	Ada... A Way of Life	721	"Hawa Sun Hawa"	A. R. Rahman	Nusrat Badr	Alka Yagnik
2010	Ada... A Way of Life	722	"Gum Sum"	A. R. Rahman	Nusrat Badr	Alka Yagnik
2010	Ada... A Way of Life	723	"Gulfisha"	A. R. Rahman	Nusrat Badr	Sunidhi Chauhan, Viviane Chaix
2011	Yamla Pagla Deewana	724	"Yamla Pagla Deewana"	Laxmikant–Pyarelal	Anand Bakshi	Nindy Kaur
2011	Dil Toh Baccha Hai Ji	725	"Tere Bin"	Pritam	Kumaar	
2011	Dil Toh Baccha Hai Ji	726	"Tere Bin" (Remix)	Pritam	Kumaar	
2011	Angel	727	"Phir Teri"	Amjad Nadeem	Shabbir Ahmed	
2011	Angel	728	"Aye Khuda"	Amjad Nadeem	Shabbir Ahmed	Sukhwinder Singh
2011	Thank You	729	"My Heart Is Beating"	Pritam	Kumaar	
2011	Thank You	730	"My Heart Is Beating" (Remix)	Pritam	Kumaar	
2011	Chatur Singh Two Star	731	"Ishqan Da Ishqan Da"	Sajid–Wajid	Shabbir Ahmed	Shweta Pandit
2011	Mummy Punjabi	732	"Mujhko Tu Pyaar Kara De"	Aadesh Shrivastava	Sameer	
2011	Love Breakups Zindagi	733	"Rab Rakha"	Salim–Sulaiman	Javed Akhtar	Shreya Ghoshal, Salim Merchant, Shraddha Pandit
2011	Love Breakups Zindagi	734	"Main Se Meena Se" (Remix)	Rajesh Roshan	Indeevar, Sahil Saanga	Shreya Ghoshal
2011	Desi Boyz	735	"Allah Maaf Kare"	Pritam	Irshad Kamil	Shilpa Rao
2012	Chaalis Chauraasi	736	"Setting Zaala"	Lalit Pandit	Sandeep Shrivastav]	Amit Kumar, Yashita Yashpal
2012	Agneepath	737	"Abhi Mujh Mein Kahin"	Ajay–Atul	Amitabh Bhattacharya	
2012	Say Yes to Love	738	"Tum Pe Hi Marta Hai Ye Dil"	Jatin Pandit	Vinu Mahendra	
2012	Say Yes to Love	739	"Jinka Asar Kab Se Hai"	Jatin Pandit	Vinu Mahendra	
2012	Say Yes to Love	740	"Ye Zindagi"	Jatin Pandit	Vinu Mahendra	Pritha Mazumder
2012	Ferrari Ki Sawaari	741	"Maara Re"	Pritam	Satyanshu Singh	Rana Majmuder, Aishwarya Nigam, Ashish
2012	Teri Meri Kahaani	742	"Jabse Mere Dil Ko Uff"	Sajid–Wajid	Prasoon Joshi	Sunidhi Chauhan
2012	Kyaa Super Kool Hain Hum	743	"Shirt Da Button"	Meet Bros Anjjan, Anjjan Bhattacharya	Kumaar	Add. vocals by Meet Bros Anjjan
2012	Krishna Aur Kans	744	"Hey Krishna" (Hey Krishna)	Shantanu Moitra	Swanand Kirkire	
2012	Krishna Aur Kans	745	"Advent of Krishna" (Aayega Koi Aayega)	Shantanu Moitra	Swanand Kirkire	Hamsika Iyer
2012	Yeh Jo Mohabbat Hai	746	"Angel My Angel"	Anu Malik	Kausar Munir	Alisha Chinai
2012	Joker	747	"Yeh Joker"	G. V. Prakash Kumar	Shirish Kunder	Shweta Pandit
2012	Raaz 3	748	"Oh My Love"	Jeet Gannguli	Sanjay Masoomm	Shreya Ghoshal
2012	1920: Evil Returns	749	"Apna Mujhe Tu Laga"	Chirantan Bhatt	Shakeel Azmi	
2012	Dabangg 2	750	"Saanson Ne"	Sajid–Wajid	Irfan Kamal	Tulsi Kumar
2013	Zila Ghaziabad	751	"Ranja Jogi"	Amjad–Nadeem	Shabbir Ahmed	Shreya Ghoshal
2013	Bloody Isshq	752	"Badlon Ki Hai Saazish"	Ashok Bhadra	Kumaar	
2013	Bloody Isshq	753	"Badlon Ki Hai Saazish"	Ashok Bhadra	Kumaar	
2013	Chashme Baddoor	754	"Har Ek Friend Kamina Hota Hai"	Sajid–Wajid	Kausar Munir	
2013	Chashme Baddoor	755	"Early Morning"	Sajid–Wajid	Jalees Sherwani	
2013	Bombay Talkies	756	"Apna Bombay Talkies"	Amit Trivedi	Swanand Kirkire	Udit, Alka, Kumar, Sadhana, Abhijeet, Kavita, Balasubrahmanyam, Sunidhi, Shaan, Shreya, KK, Sukhwinder, Shilpa, Mohit
2013	Ishkq in Paris	757	"Jaane Bhi De"	Sajid–Wajid	Kumaar	Shreya Ghoshal
2013	Ishkq in Paris	758	"Kudiye Di Kurti"	Sajid–Wajid	Jalees Sherwani	Sunidhi Chauhan
2013	Yamla Pagla Deewana 2	759	"Suit Tera Laal Rang Da"	Shaarib, Toshi	Kumaar	Sunidhi Chauhan
2013	Jatt Airways	760	"So Haseen"	Jassi Katiyal	Kumaar	
2013	Warning	761	"Taakeedein"	John Stewart	Irfan Siddiqui	John Stewart, Illhama Qasimova
2013	Besharam	762	"Tu Hai"	Lalit Pandit	Nikhat Khan	Shreya Ghoshal
2013	Besharam	763	"Tu Hai" (Unplugged)	Lalit Pandit	Nikhat Khan	Bela Shende
2013	Jal	764	"Zaalima"	Sonu Nigam, Bickram Ghosh	Sonu Nigam	
2013	Baat Bann Gayi	765	"Man Tu Shudi"	Harpreet Singh	Ubaid Azam Azmi	
2013	Boss	766	"Pitah Se Hai Naam Tera"	Meet Bros Anjjan	Kumaar	Meet Bros Anjjan
2013	Sooper Se Ooper	767	"Sapna Mera"	Sonu Nigam, Bickram Ghosh	Sonu Nigam, Shabbir Ahmed	
2013	Krrish 3	768	"God Allah Aur Bhagwan"	Rajesh Roshan	Sameer	Shreya Ghoshal
2013	Singh Saab the Great	769	"Singh Saab The Great"	Sonu Nigam	Kumaar	Teesha Nigam
2013	Singh Saab the Great	770	"Daaru Band Kal Se"	Anand Raj Anand	Kumaar	
2013	Singh Saab the Great	771	"Jab Mehndi Lag Lag Jaave"	Anand Raj Anand	Kumaar	Shreya Ghoshal
2013	Singh Saab the Great	772	"Daaru Band Kal Se" (Remix)	Anand Raj Anand	Kumaar	
2013	Singh Saab the Great	773	"Heer"	Anand Raj Anand	Kumaar	
2014	Kaanchi: The Unbreakable	774	"Tu Sab Kuch Re"	Ismail Darbar	Irshad Kamil	Anwesha Datta Gupta
2014	Kaanchi: The Unbreakable	775	"Thumka"	Salim–Sulaiman	Irshad Kamil	Suzanne D'Mello
2014	Amit Sahni Ki List	776	"Parchhai"	Palash Muchhal	Palak Muchhal	
2014	Daawat-e-Ishq	777	"Mannat"	Sajid–Wajid	Kausar Munir	Shreya Ghoshal, Keerthi Sagathia
2014	Daawat-e-Ishq	778	"Mannat" (Reprise)	Sajid–Wajid	Kausar Munir	
2014	Spark	779	"Kuchh Lab Pe Hai"	Nitz 'N' Sony	Sameer	Shreya Ghoshal
2014	Tamanchey	780	"Dildara"	Arko Pravo Mukherjee	Arko Pravo Mukherjee	
2014	Super Nani	781	"Nani Maa"	Harshit Saxena	Sameer	
2014	Kill Dil	782	"Kill Dil"	Shankar–Ehsaan–Loy	Gulzar	Shankar Mahadevan
2014	Kaash Tum Hote	783	"Betaab Tamanaa Thi"	Vinay Tiwari	Shabbir Ahmed	Asha Bhosle
2014	PK	784	"Love is a Waste of Time"	Shantanu Moitra	Amitabh Verma	Shreya Ghoshal
2014	PK	785	"Bhagwan Hai Kahan Re Tu"	Shantanu Moitra	Swanand Kirkire	
2015	Take It Easy	786	"Maa Sunn Le Zara"	Sushant–Kishor	Sunil Prem Vyas, Sushant Pawar, Amol Powle	
2015	Hey Bro	787	"Hu Tu Tu"	Nitz 'N' Sony	Pranav Vatsa	Sivamani
2015	Barkhaa	788	"Pehli Dafa"	Amjad–Nadeem	Sameer	Renuka Gaur
2015	Ishq Ke Parindey	789	"Ek Hatheli"	Vijay Vermaa	Shakeel Azmi	Keka Ghoshal
2015	Ishq Ke Parindey	790	"Ek Hatheli" (Sad)	Vijay Vermaa	Shakeel Azmi	
2015	Tanu Weds Manu: Returns	791	"O Sathi Mere"	Krsna Solo	Raj Shekhar	
2015	Brothers	792	"Sapna Jahan"	Ajay–Atul	Amitabh Bhattacharya	Neeti Mohan
2015	The Silent Heroes	793	"Ye Raste Wahi They"	Rahul Mishra	Rahul Mishra	
2016	Wazir	794	"Tere Bin"	Shantanu Moitra	Vidhu Vinod Chopra	Shreya Ghoshal
2016	Chalk n Duster	795	"Aye Zindagi"	Sandesh Shandilya	Javed Akhtar	
2016	Awesome Mausam	796	"Sathiyaan"	Komal Aran Atariya	Yogesh Bhardwaj	
2016	Santa Banta Pvt Ltd	797	"Machli Jal Ki Rani Hai"	Jaidev Kumar	Kumaar	Vikas Bhalla
2016	Santa Banta Pvt Ltd	798	"Lo Aa Gaye Santa Banta"	Amjad–Nadeem	Shabbir Ahmed	
2016	Santa Banta Pvt Ltd	799	"Hit Kardi"	Jassi Katyal	Kumaar	Diljit Dosanjh
2016	Santa Banta Pvt Ltd	800	"Ishq Karle Anytime"	Milind Gaba	Kumaar	Mika Singh
2016	Santa Banta Pvt Ltd	801	"Tooti Boldi"	Jassi Katyal	Kumaar	Mika Singh
2016	Murari the Mad Gentleman	802	"Raabta"	Biswajit Bhattacharjee	Krishan Bhardwaj	
2016	Azhar	803	"Tu Hi Na Jaane"	Amaal Mallik	Kumaar	Prakriti Kakar
2016	Sarbjit	804	"Dard"	Jeet Gannguli	Rashmi Virag, Jaani	
2016	Salaam Mumbai	805	"Aafat-e-Jaan"	Dilshaad Shabbir Shaikh	Ritu Shri	
2016	31st October	806	"Yaqeen"	Vijay Verma	Mehboob Kotwal	
2016	Raakh	807	"Bas Itna Hain Kehna"	Raju Singh	Rashmi Virag	
2017	Raees	808	"Halka Halka"	Ram Sampath	Javed Akhtar	Shreya Ghoshal
2017	Anaarkali of Aarah	809	"Mann Beqaid Huva"	Rohit Sharma	Prashant Ingole	
2017	Begum Jaan	810	"Aazaadiyan"	Anu Malik	Kausar Munir	Rahat Fateh Ali Khan
2017	Noor	811	"Gulabi" (Retro Mix)	Tanishk Bagchi	Anand Bakshi	
2017	Meri Pyaari Bindu	812	"Maana Ke Hum Yaar Nahin"	Sachin–Jigar	Kausar Munir	Parineeti Chopra
2017	Love You Family	813	"Ishq Ne Aisa Shunk Baja Ya"	Robby Badal	Tanveer Ghazi	Madhushree
2017	Mubarakan	814	"The Goggle Song"	Amaal Mallik	Kumaar	Armaan Malik, Amaal Mallik, Tulsi Kumar, Neeti Mohan
2017	Toilet: Ek Prem Katha	815	"Hans Mat Pagli"	Vickey Prasad	Siddharth Singh, Garima Wahal	Shreya Ghoshal
2017	Toilet: Ek Prem Katha	816	"Gori Tu Latth Maar"	Manas–Shikhar	Siddharth Singh, Garima Wahal	Palak Muchhal
2017	Sallu Ki Shaadi	817	"Bismil Hai"	Prashant Singh, Manu Rajeev	Mohammad Israr Ansari	Neeti Mohan
2017	Half Widow	818	"Kuch Baaqi Hai"	Sonu Nigam	Sunayana Kachroo	
2018	Baa Baaa Black Sheep	819	"Angelina"	Gourav–Roshin	Sunil Sirvaiya	
2018	Shaadi Teri Bajayenge Hum Band	820	"Rabb Jane"	Rupak Iyer	Raza Nadir	
2018	Ishq Tera	821	"Ishq Tera"	Swapnil H Digde	Manoj Yadav	Shreya Ghoshal
2018	102 Not Out	822	"Kulfi"	Salim–Sulaiman	Saumya Joshi	
2018	5 Weddings	823	"Baaki Hai"	Vibhas	Abhendra Kumar Upadhyay	Shreya Ghoshal
2018	Hope Aur Hum	824	"Acche Bacche Rote Nahin"	Rupert Fernandes	Saurabh Dikshit	
2018	Sanju	825	"Main Badhiya Tu Bhi Badhiya"	Rohan-Rohan	Puneet Sharma	Sunidhi Chauhan
2018	Fanney Khan	826	"Badan Pe Sitare"	Amit Trivedi	Irshad Kamil	
2018	Paltan	827	"Raat Kitni"	Anu Malik	Javed Akhtar	
2018	Paltan	828	"Main Zinda Hoon"	Anu Malik	Javed Akhtar	
2018	Mitron	829	"Door Na Ja"	Shaarib–Toshi	Kalim Shaikh	
2018	Kaashi in Search of Ganga	830	"Betahasha"	Ankit Tiwari	Abhendra Kumar Upadhyay	Palak Muchhal
2019	Little Boy	831	"Alvida Alvida"	Abuzar	Arafat Mehmood	
2019	S.P. Chauhan	832	"Marham"	Vibhas	Abhendra Kumar Upadhyay	
2019	S.P. Chauhan	833	"Ishq Ki Gali"	Vibhas	Abhendra Kumar Upadhyay	Miss Pooja
2019	S.P. Chauhan	834	"Sadke Jawaan" (Reprise)	Vibhas	Dr. Devendra Kafir	Jonita Gandhi
2019	Facebook Wala Pyar	835	"Mann Bawra"	Raja Pandit	Shweta Raj, Raja Pandit	Shreya Ghoshal
2019	Facebook Wala Pyar	836	"Mai Fida"	Raja Pandit	Shweta Raj	
2019	Facebook Wala Pyar	837	"Mai Fida" (Male)	Raja Pandit	Shweta Raj	
2019	Milan Talkies	838	"Shart"	Rana Mazumder	Amitabh Bhattacharya	
2019	Romeo Akbar Walter	839	"Vande Matram"	Shabbir Ahmed	Shabbir Ahmed	Ekta Kapoor
2019	Naughty Gang	840	"Charkhe Di Kook"	Paresh A. Shah	Kumaar	
2019	Hume Tumse Pyaar Kitna	841	"Hume Tumse Pyaar Kitna"	Recreated Raaj Aashoo	Shabbir Ahmed	R.D Burman, Majrooh Sultanpuri
2019	Marudhar Express	842	"Mirza Ve" (Male)	Jeet Gannguli	Manoj Muntashir	
2019	Family of Thakurganj	843	"Hum Teri Ore Chale"	Sajid–Wajid	Danish Sabri	Shreya Ghoshal
2019	Pranaam	844	"Ilaahi"	Vishal Mishra	Manoj Muntashir	
2019	Cypher	845	"Meri Maa"	Bharat Kamal	Sagar Pathak	
2019	Marne Bhi Do Yaaron	846	"Aye Dil Zara"	Rajendra Shiv	Ravi Chopra	

=== 2020s ===
†	Denotes films that have not yet been released

Year	Film	#	Song	Composer(s)	Lyricist(s)	Co-artist(s)	Note
2020	Forever	847	"Humne To Yeh Nahi Socha Tha"	Vinay Ram Tiwari		Solo	
2020	Ateet	848	"Zara Kareeb Aa"	Harish Sagane	Shakeel Azmi	Yamini Ghantasala	ZEE5 film
2020	Chaman Bahaar	849	"Do Ka Chaar"	Anshuman Mukherjee	Apurva Dhar Badgaiyan	Solo	
2020	Khuda Haafiz	850	"Aakhri Kadam Tak"	Mithoon		Solo	Disney+ Hotstar film
2020	Atkan Chatkan	851	"Mann Tu"	Drums Sivamani	Abhishek Brahmachari	Solo	ZEE5 film
2020	Smile Simi	852	"Jaano Na Jaano Tum"	Jatin–Pratik	Kabir Thapar, Jatin–Pratik, Malathi Rai	Solo	
2021	Mera Fauji Calling	853	"Bheeni Bheeni Si"	Vijay Verma	Rajesh Manthan	Pratibha Singh Baghel	
2021	Lockdown to Unlock	854	"Ye Zindgi Sawar Gayi"	Dhananjay Galani	Shekhar Astitwa	Solo	
2021	Bekhudi	855	"Mere Zehen Mein"	Swaransh Mishra		Solo	
2021	Code Name Abdul	856	"Main Saaya Tera"	Amar Mohile	Rishabh P. Nair	Solo	
2022	Cinemaa Zindabad	857	"Vidhna Hara Re"	Raj Prakash Bisen	Rajesh Nishadh	Solo	MX Player
2022	Aa Bhi Ja O Piya	858	"Dil Mein Thee"	Asutosh Singh		Solo	
2022	36 Farmhouse	859	"Mohabbat"	Subhash Ghai		Solo	ZEE5 film
2022	Ardh	860	"Zindagi"	Palash Muchhal	Kunaal Vermaa	Solo	ZEE5 film
2022	Laal Singh Chaddha	861	"Main Ki Karaan?"	Pritam	Amitabh Bhattacharya	Romy	
2022	Laal Singh Chaddha	862	"Kahani" (Sonu's Version)	Pritam	Amitabh Bhattacharya	Solo	
2022	Saroj Ka Rishta	863	"Haazri Lagaye Dil"	Rahul Jain	Sanjeev Chaturvedi	Solo	
2023	Mission Majnu	863	"Maati Ko Maa Kehte Hain"	Rochak Kohli	Manoj Muntashir	Rochak Kohli	Netflix film
2023	Mission Majnu	864	"Maati Ko Maa Kehte Hain" (Extended Version)	Rochak Kohli	Manoj Muntashir	Solo	Netflix film
2023	Shehzada	865	"Shehzada"	Pritam	Mayur Puri	Solo	
2023	Raundal	866	"Tuta Sitara"	Harsshit Abhiraj	Sudhakar Sharma	Solo	Marathi Dubbed film
2023	Sirf Ek Bandaa Kaafi Hai	867	"Bandeya"	Sangeet-Siddharth	Garima Obrah, Sangeet Haldipur	Solo	ZEE5 film
2023	La Vaste	868	"Wahi Hai Mera Ram"	Manojj Negi	Dr Ravikant Pathak, Anurag Chaturvedi	Solo	
2023	Adipurush	869	"Tu Hai Sheetal Dhaara"	Ajay–Atul	Manoj Muntashir	Shreya Ghoshal	
2023	Adipurush	870	"Jai Shri Ram" (Sonu Nigam Version)	Ajay–Atul	Manoj Muntashir	Solo	Not included in the Soundtrack
2023	Ek Ank	871	"Ek Ank - Title Song"	Puneet Avasthi, Nitesh Shrivastava	Prabaht Kumar	Solo	
2023	Rocky Aur Rani Kii Prem Kahaani	872	"Ro Lain De"	Pritam	Amitabh Bhattacharya	Shilpa Rao	
2023	Love-All	873	"Jhat Pat"	Saurabh Vaibhav	Sonal	Solo	
2023	The Great Indian Family	874	"Pukaroon Hari Om"	Pritam	Amitabh Bhattacharya	Solo	
2023	Bagha Jatin	875	"Hai Yeh Wada"	Nilayan Chatterjee		Solo	
2023	Sab Moh Maya Hai	876	"Dua"	Amol-Abhishek	Abhishek Talented	Solo	
2023	Shastry Vs Shastry	877	"Khushi Ke Bahane"	Anupam Roy	Manoj Yadav	Solo	
2023	Manush	878	"Din Ka Hai Tara Mera Tu"	Savvy	Prashant Ingole	Solo	
2023	Animal	879	"Papa Meri Jaan"	Harshavardhan Rameshwar	Raj Shekhar	Solo	
2023	Sam Bahadur	880	"Itni Si Baat"	Shankar–Ehsaan–Loy	Gulzar	Shreya Ghoshal	
2023	Dunki	881	"Nikle The Kabhi Hum Ghar Se"	Pritam	Javed Akhtar	Solo	
2023	Safed	882	"Rona Aaya"	Shashi Suman	Mehboob	Solo	
2024	Main Atal Hoon	883	"Main Atal Hoon - Theme"	Salim-Sulaiman	Traditional	Solo	
2024	JNU - Jahangir National University	884	"Sannata"	Vijay Verma	Rajesh Manthan	Lakshay Sharma, Supriya Pathak	
2024	Main Ladega	885.	"Maai Meri"	Mukund Suryawanshi	Vaishnavi Thakur	Solo	
2024	Kartam Bhugtam	886.	"Khuda Tera Bhi Hai"	Shabbir Ahmed		Deepali Sathe	
2024	Ishq Vishk Rebound	887.	"Ishq Vishk Pyaar Vyaar"	Rochak Kohli	Gurpreet Saini	Nikhita Gandhi, Mellow D	
2024	Boomerang	888.	"O Bairiya"	Nilayan Chatterjee	Prashant Ingole	Solo	
2024	Padatik	889.	"Tu Zinda Hai"	Salil Chowdhury	Shailendra (lyricist)	Arijit Singh	
2024	Maharaj	890.	"Achutam Keshavam"	Sohail Sen	Kausar Munir	Solo	Netflix release
2024	Bhool Bhulaiyaa 3	891	"Hukkush Phukkush"	Tanishk Bagchi	Som	Solo	
2024	Bhool Bhulaiyaa 3	892	"Mere Dholna 3.0"	Amaal Mallik, Pritam	Sameer	Solo	
2024	Vanvaas	893	"Yaadon Ke Jharokhon Se"	Mithoon	Sayeed Quadri	Shreya Ghoshal	
2024	Vanvaas	894	"Ram Dhun"	Mithoon	Sayeed Quadri	Sukhwinder Singh, Vijay Prakash, Mahalakshmi Iyer, Mohd. Danish	
2025	Inn Galiyon Mein	895	"Jaa Jaanam Jaa"	Amaal Mallik	Punarvasu	Sanjith Hegde	
2025	Kesari Chapter 2	896	"Beetegi Raina"	Shashwat Sachdev and Kavita Seth–Kanishk Seth	Irshad Kamil	Sanjith Hegde	
2025	Ground Zero	897	"Lahoo"	Tanishk Bagchi	Rashmi Virag	Sanjith Hegde	
2025	Kesari Veer	898	"Kesari Bandhan"	Monty Sharma	Monty Sharma	Solo	
2025	Tanvi the Great	899	"Sena Ki Jai (Male Version)"	M. M. Keeravani	Kausar Munir	Solo	
2025	Sarzameen	900	"Aa Gale Lag Jaa"	Vishal Khurana K	Kausar Munir	Solo	
2025	Sarzameen	901	"Aa Gale Lag Jaa (Duet Version)"	Vishal Khurana K	Kausar Munir	Shreya Ghoshal	
2025	Param Sundari	902	"Pardesiya"	Sachin-Jigar	Amitabh Bhattacharya	Krishnakali Saha, Sachin-Jigar	
2025	Interrogation	903	"Aye Maa"	Varun Sunil	Sudhakar Sharma	Solo	ZEE5 release
2025	Sunny Sanskari Ki Tulsi Kumari	904	"Bijuria"	Tanishk Bagchi (originally by Ravi Pawar)	Ajay Jhingran	Asees Kaur, Tanishk Bagchi	
2025	Dhurandhar	905	"Move - Yeh Ishq Ishq"	Shashwat Sachdev (originally by Roshan)	Sahir Ludhianvi, Reble	Reble	
2025	Kis Kisko Pyaar Karoon 2	906	"Har Safar Mein"	Parikshit Sharma, Nishadh Chandra	Vimal Kashyap	Solo	
2026	Border 2	907	"Ghar Kab Aaoge"	Anu Malik, Mithoon (recreation)	Javed Akhtar, Manoj Muntashir (additional)	Roop Kumar Rathod, Arijit Singh, Diljit Dosanjh, Vishal Mishra	
2026	Border 2	908	"Mohabbat Ho Gayi Hai"	Anu Malik, Mithoon (recreation)	Javed Akhtar, Manoj Muntashir (additional)	Palak Muchhal	
2026	Border 2	909	"Mitti Ke Bete"	Mithoon	Manoj Muntashir	Solo	
2026	Bhabiji Ghar Par Hain! Fun on the Run	910	"Manjogi"	Vishal Shelke	Ghulam Mohd. Khavar	Solo	
2026	Do Deewane Seher Mein	911	"Do Deewane Seher Mein - Title Track"	Shreyas Puranik	Kumaar	Aishwarya Bhandari	
2026	Ginny Wedss Sunny 2	912	"Tumpe Hi Pyaar Aa Gaya"	Sushant-Shankar	Kumaar	Solo	
2026	Krishnavataram Part 1: The Heart (Hridayam)	913	"Shyamal Sanware"	Prasad S	Irshad Kamil	Neeti Mohan, Prasad S	
2026	Krishnavataram Part 1: The Heart (Hridayam)	914	"Anth Mein Aarambh"	Prasad S	Irshad Kamil	Solo	
2026	Daadi Ki Shaadi	915	"Suno Naa Dil"	Gulraj Singh	Manoj Yadav	Sunidhi Chauhan	
2026	Batwara 1947	916	"Tabassum"	A. R. Rahman	Javed Akhtar	Heer	
2026	Prahaar: The Untold Story of Ujjwal Nikam	917	"Tujh Mein Basi Meri Jaan"	Pritam	Amitabh Bhattacharya	Shreya Ghoshal	

== Hindi non-film songs ==
Year	Film/Album	Song	Composer(s)	Co-artist(s)	Note
1984	Bombay Girl	"Kal Hi Ki Baat Hai"	Lesle Lewis, Alisha Chinai	Solo	First indipop song debuted
2006	Tirupati Shri Balaji	"Kya Hua"	Bhushan Kumar	solo	
2006	Tirupati Shri Balaji	"Chhupa Lo"	Bhushan Kumar	solo	
2006	Tirupati Shri Balaji	"Antaryami"	Bhushan Kumar	Ramana Gogula, Lenina Chowdary	
2014	Kuchh Dil Ne Kaha	"Hasrat Bhari Nazar"	Anup Jalota	Solo	
2019	Madhosh Teri Aankhen	"Ishq Hai Ek Toofan"		Altaf Sabri, Hashim Sabri	
2020	Sitam Gar	"Kitni Mohabbat Hai Tujhko"		Suchandra	
2020	Sitam Gar	"Deewana Hai Yeh Mann"		Alka Yagnik	
2026	Parvana	"Iss Tarah"	Chaar Diwaari	Chaar Diwaari	

== Kannada film songs ==
=== 1990s ===
Year	Film	Song	Composer(s)	Writer(s)	Co-artist(s)
1996	Jeevanadhi	"Yello Yaro"	Koti	R. N. Jayagopal	
1999	Snehaloka	"Titanic Heroine"	Hamsalekha	Hamsalekha	Hemanth, Nanditha

=== 2000s ===
Year	Film	Song	Composer(s)	Writer(s)	Co-artist(s)
2000	Sparsha	"Kanasali Kaaduva"	Hamsalekha	Doddarangegowda	Kavita Krishnamurti
2001	Baava Baamaida	"Preethi Nee Illade" "Jumbalaka Jum"	Hamsalekha	Hamsalekha	K. S. Chithra
2001	Chithra	"Jhum Jhum Romanchana" "Jimbole "	Gurukiran	K. Kalyan	K. S. Chitra
2001	Chithra	"Pori Tapori"	Gurukiran	K. Kalyan	Shankar Shanbog, Murali Mohan, Gurukiran, Arun Sagar
2001	Gattimela	"Hamsave Hamsave"	Hamsalekha	Hamsalekha	K. S. Chithra
2001	Gattimela	"Hamsave Hamsave" (Solo)	Hamsalekha	Hamsalekha	
2001	Huchcha	"Hudgiro Hudgiro"	Rajesh Ramnath	K. Kalyan	
2001	Huchcha	"Usire Usire"	Rajesh Ramnath	K. Kalyan	Nanditha
2001	Majnu	"Cheluve Yake Bande"	Gurukiran		
2001	Majnu	"Cheluve Eke Bande (Sad)"	Gurukiran		
2001	Majnu	"I Love You Darling"	Gurukiran		Sowmya Rao, Gurukiran
2001	Premi No 1	"Premi No 1"	V. Manohar		Sowmya
2001	Premi No 1	"Aaha Ellelu"	V. Manohar		
2002	Ekangi	"Once Upon A Time"	V. Ravichandran		
2002	Nata	"Mouriya Mouriya" "Preetiye Ninna" "Sagariye Ninna"	Gurukiran		
2002	Ninagoskara	"Preethiyalli"(Duet)	L. N. Shastri	K. Kalyan	Nanditha, Suma Sashri, L.N.Shashri,
2002	Ninagoskara	"Aasege Savira Roopa"	L. N. Shastri	K. Kalyan	Archana Udupa, K.S.Chitra
2002	Ninagoskara	"Preethiyalli"(Solo)	L. N. Shastri	K. Kalyan	Vani Jayaram
2002	Super Star	"Antu Antu"	Hamsalekha	Upendra	Nanditha
2002	Majestic	"Muddu Manase"	Sadhu Kokila	Dr.Nagendra Prasad	C.R. Chaya
2003	Game	"Happy Day"	Vaishali-Sandeep		
2003	Game	"Hrudaya Hoovu"	Vaishali-Sandeep		
2003	Game	"Game Title Track"	Vaishali-Sandeep		
2003	Lankesh Patrike	"Yendu Kanda Kanasu"			Kavita Krishnamurti
2003	Lankesh Patrike	"Akashane Egee"			Sowmya Raoh
2003	Paris Pranaya	"Rome Rome"	Stephen Prayog	Nagathihalli Chandrashekhar	Shreya Ghoshal
2003	Preethisle Beku	"Cheluve Nanage" "Preethisale Beku"			
2004	Chappale	"Good Morning"	R. P. Patnaik		
2004	Chappale	"Enu Evaga"			
2004	Chappale	"Chappale Tattuta"			Udit Narayan, R.P. Patnayak
2004	Kanchana Ganga	"Sooryana Kirana" "Naa Ninna Bidalare" (Version ) "Norondu Choranu"	S. A. Rajkumar	K. Kalyan	Vaishali
2004	Kanti	"Baninda baa Chandira"	Gurukiran		
2004	Love	"Love Ge Jaari Bidde"	Anu Malik		Shreya Ghoshal
2004	Love	"Are Jamu Jamu"	Anu Malik		
2004	Giri	"Neene Neene Neenene"	Chakri (composer)		
2004	Monalisa	"Monalisa"	Valisha-Sandeep	V. Nagendra Prasad	K. S. Chithra
2004	Rowdy Aliya	"Ammamma Shaku" "Nannolave Ninage"	Valisha-Sandeep	Shree Ranga	Sowmya Raoh
2004	Thaali Kattuva Shubhavele	"Ee Baalu Heegake"	Robin Gurung		
2004	Thaali Kattuva Shubhavele	"Belakina Balige Neene"			
2005	Aham Premasmi	"Kannale Kannale"			
2005	Aham Premasmi	"Ishwar Ishwar" "Pullinga Pullinga"	V. Ravichandran		Sunidhi Chauhan
2005	Namma Basava	"Seritumana"	Gurukiran		Shreya Ghoshal
2005	Rishi	"Ellellu Habba Habba"	Gurukiran	V. Manohar	K S Chithra
2005	Siddhu	"Nee Sheetala"	R. P. Patnaik		
2005	Siri Chandana	"Nannavalu Nannavalu" "Siri Chandana Avalu"	S. A. Rajkumar		
2006	Jothe Jotheyali	"O Gunavantha"	V. Harikrishna	V. Nagendra Prasad	Shreya Ghoshal
2006	Mungaru Male	"Mungaru Maleye"	Mano Murthy	Jayant Kaikini	
2006	Mungaru Male	"Anisuthide"	Mano Murthy	Jayant Kaikini	
2006	Shree	"Masthana Masthana" "Matte Saguthide" "Manasagide"	Valisha – Sandeep	Jayant Kaikini	
2007	Cheluvina Chithara	"Kanaso Idu"	Mano Murthy	S. Narayan	Sunidhi Chauhan
2007	Ee Bandhana	"Ade Bhoomi Ade Bhanu"	Mano Murthy	Jayanth Kaikini	
2007	Ee Bandhana	"Ade Bhoomi Ade Bhanu "(Male)	Mano Murthy	Jayanth Kaikini	Shreya Ghoshal
2007	Geleya	"Ee Sanje Yaakagide"	Mano Murthy	Jayant Kaikini	
2007	Krishna	"Neenu Banda Mele" "Gollara Golla"	V. Harikrishna	Kaviraj	Nanditha
2007	Milana	"Ninnindale Ninnindale"	Mano Murthy	Jayanth Kaikini	
2007	Milana	"Male Nintu Hoda Mele" (Duet)	Mano Murthy	Jayanth Kaikini	Shreya Ghoshal
2007	Milana	"Ninnindale"(Remix)	Mano Murthy	Jayanth Kaikini	
2007	Savi Savi Nenapu	"Saviyo Saviyo" "Saviyo Saviyo" (Patho)	R. P. Patnaik	Nagathihalli Chandrashekhar	Shreya Ghoshal
2007	Soundarya	"Belakinda Banella"	Hamsalekha		
2007	Soundarya	"Belakininda Banella" (Duet)	Hamsalekha	Hamsalekha	
2007	Soundarya	"Alli Nodu Alli Nodu" "Hrudayada Mathu"	Hamsalekha	Hamsalekha	Shreya Ghoshal, Nanditha Hamsalekha
2008	Accident	"Baa Maleye Baa"	Ricky Kej	BR Laxman Rao	
2008	Accident	"Dheem Dheem"	Ricky Kej	Rajendra Karanth	Mahalakshmi Iyer
2008	Accident	"Baa Maleye"(Remix) "Baa Maleye Baa" (Solo)	Ricky Kej	BR Laxman Rao	
2008	Arjun	"Balle Balle"	V. Harikrishna	V. Nagendra Prasad	Shreya Ghoshal
2008	Bombaat	"Maathinalli"(Male)	Mano Murthy		
2008	Bombaat	"Chinna Hele Hegiruve"	Mano Murthy		
2008	Bombaat	"Mathinalli"	Mano Murthy		Shreya Ghoshal
2008	Gaalipata	"Minchagi Neenu"	V. Harikrishna	Jayanth Kaikini	
2008	Gaalipata	"Onde Samane"	V. Harikrishna	Yogaraj Bhat	
2008	Gaja	"Mathu Nannolu" "Lambuji" "Sreekarane"	V. Harikrishna	V. Nagendra Prasad	Shreya Ghoshal
2008	Haage Summane	"Haage Summane"	Mano Murthy		
2008	Haage Summane	"Odi Bandenu"(Male)	Mano Murthy		
2008	Hani Hani	"Ninna Ee" "Hani Hani"	S.Chinna		Shreya Ghoshal
2008	Madesha	"Lahari"(Male)	Mano Murthy		
2008	Madesha	"Lahari"(Duet) "Lahari"(Solo)	Mano Murthy		
2008	Moggina Manasu	"I love you"	Mano Murthy		
2008	Moggina Manasu	"I Love You"(Bit)	Mano Murthy		
2008	Moggina Manasu	"O Nanna Manave" "Om Namah Om" "Moggina Manasali" (Male) "Moggina Manasaali" (Duet)	Mano Murthy		
2008	Mussanjemaatu	"Enaagali"	V. Sridhar	V. Sridhar	
2008	Mussanjemaatu	"Ninna Nodalentho" "Anuraga Aralo Samaya" "O Hrudaya"	V. Sridhar	Ram Narayan	Shreya Ghoshal
2008	Navagraha	"Kan Kan Salige"	V. Harikrishna	V. Nagendra Prasad	
2008	Neene Neene	"Yenu Yenu"(Happy)			
2008	Neene Neene	"Yenu Yenu"(Sad)			
2008	Neenyare	"Ee Thuditha"	V. Manohar		
2008	Paramesha Panwala	"Dil Dhadak Dhadak"	V. Harikrishna	V. Nagendra Prasad	Anuradha Bhat
2008	Payana	"Modada Olage"	V. Harikrishna		Ranjith
2008	Payana	"Manasa Gange"	V. Harikrishna		Chaitra G. H
2008	Payana	"Gup Chup"	V. Harikrishna		Suma Shashtry
2008	Rocky	"Manase Manase"	Venkat – Narayan		
2008	Shivani	"Mathe Mathe Ninna"	Jamesh Sakaleshpur		
2008	Vamshi	"Bhuvanam Gaganam" "Bhuvanam"	R. P. Patnaik	V. Nagendra Prasad	
2009	Abhay	"Yaako Eno"	V. Harikrishna	V. Nagendra Prasad	
2009	Ambari	"Aakasha Neene"	V. Harikrishna		
2009	Ambari	"Akasha Neene"(Duet)	V. Harikrishna		
2009	Cheluvina Chilipili	"Nijaana Naanena"	Mickey J. Meyer	S. Narayan	
2009	Circus	"Pisugudale"			
2009	Circus	"Pisugudale"(Happy) "Pisugudale"(Romantic)	Emil Mohammed		
2009	Gokula	"Aaramagi Idde Naanu"	Mano Murthy		Shreya Ghoshal
2009	Gokula	"Neene Helu Nanna"	Mano Murthy		
2009	Gokula	"Aaramagi Idde Naanu"(Remix)	Mano Murthy		Shreya Ghoshal
2009	Iniya	"Muddhada Ee Nagu"	V. Sridhar		Nanditha
2009	Jeeva	"Summane Yaake Bande"	Gurukiran		Shruthi
2009	Junglee	"Neenendare"	V. Harikrishna		
2009	Male Barali Manju Irali	"Gelathi Neenu"	Mano Murthy		Shreya Ghoshal
2009	Maleyali Jotheyali	"Maleyali Jotheyali"	V. Harikrishna		
2009	Maleyali Jotheyali	"Nee Sanihake"	V. Harikrishna		
2009	Maleyali Jotheyali	"Yenu Helabeku"	V. Harikrishna		Shreya Ghoshal
2009	Manasaare	"Ello Maleyaagide"	Mano Murthy		
2009	Manasaare	"Onde Ninna"	Mano Murthy		Kunal Ganjawala, K. K. Udit Narayan
2009	Raam	"Neenendare Nanage Ista Kane"	V. Harikrishna	V. Nagendra Prasad	Shreya Ghoshal

=== 2010s ===
Year	Film	Song	Composer(s)	Writer(s)	Co-artist(s)	
2010	Appu and Pappu	"Makkaligaagi"	Hamsalekha	Deva	Hamsalekha, Latha Hamsalekha,	
2010	Ullasa Utsaha	"Chalisuva Cheluve"	G. V. Prakash Kumar	Jayanth Kaikini	Saindhavi	
2010	Nooru Janmaku	"Maneyanu Kattona"	Mano Murthy			
2010	Nanjanagoodu Nanjunda	"Mella Mella Ee Preethi"				
2010	Antharatma	"Jagadalu Kaanisada"				
2010	Premism	"Sagamapaanisa"	Hamsalekha			
2010	Krishnan Love Story	"Hruduyave"	V. Sridhar	Jayanth Kaikini	Vidyashree, Sridhar V Sambram	
2010	Bisile	"Ee Bisilali"				
2010	Cheluveye Ninna Nodalu	"O Priyatama"	V. Harikrishna	S. Narayan	Sunitha Upadrashta	
2010	Cheluveye Ninna Nodalu	"Janumada Jodi"	V. Harikrishna	Nagathihalli Chandrashekhar	Sunitha Upadrashta	
2010	Pancharangi	"Udisuve Belakina Seere"	Mano Murthy	Jayanth Kaikini		
2010	Jackie	"Eradu Jadeyannu"	V. Harikrishna	Yogaraj Bhat	Shreya Ghoshal	
2010	Kichha Huchha	"Nudisale"	V. Harikrishna	Yogaraj Bhat	Anuradha Sriram	
2010	Chirru	"Ille Illi Yello"	Giridhar Diwan	Ghouse Peer	Shreya Ghoshal	
2010	Chirru	"Ninna Kannalide"	Giridhar Diwan	Jayanth Kaikini		
2010	Naanu Nanna Kanasu	"Putta Putta Kai"	Hamsalekha			
2010	Naanu Nanna Kanasu	"Munduduva"	Hamsalekha			
2011	Aata	"Onde Samane"(Male)	Sadhu Kokila			
2011	Aata	"Ninninada"	Sadhu Kokila			
2011	Jarasandha	"Avarivara Jothe"	Arjun Janya		Anuradha Bhat	
2011	Lifeu Ishtene	"Maayavi Maayavi"	Mano Murthy	Yogaraj Bhat	Shreya Ghoshal	
2011	Lifeu Ishtene	"Ninna Gungalle"	Mano Murthy	Jayanth Kaikini		
2011	Mr. Duplicate	"Ninnanne Nodutha"	Mano Murthy		Shreya Ghoshal	
2011	Paramathma	"Paravashanadenu"	V. Harikrishna			
2011	Hudugaru	"Neeralli Sanna"	V. Harikrishna		Sunitha Upadrashta	
2011	Hudugaru	"Neeralli Sanna"	V. Harikrishna			
2011	Jogayya	"Yaaru Kaanadooru"	V. Harikrishna	Prem	Shreya Ghoshal	
2011	Jogayya	"Hethavalalla Avalu"				
2011	Sanju Weds Geetha	"Sanju Mathu Geetha"	Jassie Gift	Kaviraj	Shreya Ghoshal	
2011	Sanju Weds Geetha	"Sanju Mattu Geetha"	Jassie Gift	Kaviraj		
2011	Sanju Weds Geetha	"Thangaliyaagu"	Jassie Gift	Kaviraj		
2011	Johny Mera Naam Preethi Mera Kaam	"Yaava Seemeya"	V. Harikrishna	Jayanth Kaikini	R.P. Patnayak	
2011	Johny Mera Naam Preethi Mera Kaam	"Yellavannu Heluvaase"	V. Harikrishna	Yogaraj Bhat	Rangayana Raghu, V. HariKrishna	
2011	Rajadhani	"Midiva Ninna"	Arjun Janya	Jayanth Kaikini	Shreya Ghoshal	
2011	Kool...Sakkath Hot Maga	"Nodutha Nodutha"	V. Harikrishna	Kaviraj		
2011	Krishnan Marriage Story	"Ee Sanje"	V. Sridhar		Anuradha Bhat	
2011	Krishnan Marriage Story	"Ee Janmavu"	V. Sridhar		Shreya Ghoshal	
2011	Prema Chandrama	"Ommomme Yako"				
2011	Dandam Dashagunam	"Ondooral Oblu Cheluve"	V. Harikrishna			
2011	Antharya	"Nenapina Male Hani"				
2012	Katariveera Surasundarangi	"Jhum Jhumka"				
2012	Lucky	"Hoovina Santhege"	Arjun Janya	Jayant Kaikini	Shreya Ghoshal	
2012	Anna Bond	"Yenendu Hesaridali"	V. Harikrishna	Jayant Kaikini	Shreya Ghoshal	
2012	Parijatha	"O Parijatha"	Mano Murthy	Kaviraj	Shreya Ghoshal	
2012	Jaanu	"Neene Nanna Saviganasu"	V. Harikrishna	Jayant Kaikini		
2012	Drama	"Chendutiya Pakkadali"	V. Harikrishna			
2012	Sagar	"Modale Yeke"	Gurukiran	Kaviraj		
2012	Sangolli Rayanna	"Nannede Veene"			Anuradha Bhat	
2012	Preethi Nee Shashwathana	"Obba Hudugana Manassu"				
2012	Nimhans	"Anju Malle Malle"				
2012	Yaare Koogadali	"Yaarivanu Yaarivanu"	V. Harikrishna		Anuradha Bhat	
2012	Prem Adda	"Kalli Ivalu"	V. Harikrishna	V. Nagendra Prasad	Shreya Ghoshal	
2013	Victory	"Kanna Minche"	Arjun Janya			
2013	Victory	"Kanna Minche"(Duet)	Arjun Janya		Anuradha Bhat	
2013	Mynaa	"Mynaa Mynaa"	Jessie Gift			
2013	Mynaa	"Modala Maleyanthe"	Jessie Gift		Shreya Ghoshal	
2013	Barfi	"O Mahiyave"	Arjun Janya		Shreya Ghoshal	
2013	Barfi	"Kannali Kannidu"	Arjun Janya		Shreya Ghoshal	
2013	Bangari	"Yenella Helona"			Shreya Ghoshal	
2013	Ale	"Manada Havamana"	Mano Murthy		Shreya Ghoshal	
2013	Ale	"Athi Aathura"	Mano Murthy			
2013	Tony	"Andaaje Siguthilla"	Sadhu Kokila		Sunidhi Chauhan	
2013	Simple Agi Ondh Love Story	"Baanali Badalago"	Bharath B J			
2013	Galaate	"Buddhi Illa"				
2013	Googly	"Neenirade"				
2013	Bachchan	"Sadaa Ninna"	V Harikrishna		Shreya Ghoshal	
2013	Bulbul	"Jagadalliro Huchcha"	V Harikrishna			
2013	Kaddipudi	"Soundarya Samara"	V Harikrishna	Yograj Bhat		
2013	Chandra	"Mouna Mounadalli"			Anuradha Bhat	
2013	Raja Huli	"Chaltha Chaltha"	Hamsalekha			
2013	Sakkare	"Iddaliye"	V. Harikrishna			
2013	Sakkare	"Free Ideera"	V. Harikrishna		Nanditha	
2013	Shravani Subramanya	"Ninna Nodo"(Solo) "Naguva Mogada"			Nanditha	
2014	Ambareesha	"Kannale"	V. Harikrishna	V. Nagendra Prasad	Shreya Ghoshal	
2014	Fair & Lovely	"Ringagide"				
2014	Fair & Lovely	"Haage Ondu"				
2014	Mr. and Mrs. Ramachari	"Upavasa"			Shreya Ghoshal	
2014	Bahaddur	"Neene Neene"				
2014	Love Is Poison	"E Khali Hrudaya"				
2014	Athi Aparoopa	"Athi Aparoopa"				
2014	Athi Aparoopa	"Maleya Haniyalli"				
2014	Endendu Ninagagi	"Nee Jothe"				
2014	Paru Wife of Devadas	"Kannale Neenu"	Arjun Janya		Palak Muchhal	
2014	Paru Wife of Devadas	"O Devathe"	Arjun Janya			
2015	1st Rank Raju	"Yekangi Naanu Yekangi"	Kiran Ravindranath			
2015	Abhinetri	"Manasinali Niranthara"	Mano Murthy			
2015	Bangalore 560023	"Nannavale"	Arun Andrews			
2015	Buguri	"Alu Bandaru"	Mickey J. Meyer			
2015	Endendigu	"Ninnalle"	V. Harikrishna			
2015	Endendigu	"Kanna Kajal"	V. Harikrishna			
2015	Endendigu	"Iduvarige"	V. Harikrishna			
2015	Ganapa	"Muddagi Neenu"	Karan B Krupa			
2015	Namak Haram	"Manaseko Eegeega"	Sathish Aryan			
2015	Ramleela	"Neenu Banda Mele"	Anup Rubens			
2015	Rhaatee	"Nanna Bennalina"	V. Harikrishna			
2015	Siddhartha	"Ninna Nenape"	V. Harikrishna			
2015	Sharp Shooter	"Yelle Hodaru"(Duet)	MS Shiva Santhosh			
2015	Sharp Shooter	"Yelle Hodaru"(Solo)	MS Shiva Santhosh			
2015	Vaastu Prakaara	"Besara Kaathara"	V. Harikrishna			
2015	Vamshodharaka	"Hayagi Haradu"	V. Manohar			
2015	2016	Jaggu Dada	"Tale Kedutte Hudugi"	V. Harikrishna		
2015	2016	Krishna-Rukku	"Helilla Yarallu Naanu"	Sridhar V. Sambhram		
2015	2016	Maduveya Mamatheya Kareyole	"Marana Dandane"	V. Harikrishna		
2015	2016	Mast Mohabbat	"Endo Kaanada"	Mano Murthy		
2015	2016	Mast Mohabbat	"Belakina Hoovanthe"	Mano Murthy		
2015	2016	Mungaru Male 2	"Gamanisu"	Arjun Janya		
2015	2016	Bhujanga	"Naale Enutha"			Sridevi
2015	2016	Santheyalli Nintha Kabira	"Baare Ninage Naanu"			
2015	2016	Happy Birthday	"Prathi Mounava"			
Santhu Straight Forward	2016	"Thangaali"				
Santhu Straight Forward	2016	"Koodi Itta"				
Madha Mathu Manasi	2016	"Bareyada Geetheya"	Mano Murthy	Jayanth Kaikini		
Madha Mathu Manasi	2016	"Vismithanaade"	Mano Murthy	Sathish Pradhan	Shreya Ghoshal	
Naanu Mattu Varalakshmi	2016	"Meredadide"	V. Harikrishna	Jayanth Kaikini		
Naani	2016	"O Manase"	M S Thyagaraju			
2017	Chakravarthy	"Mathe Maleyagide"	Arjun Janya	Dr. Umesh	Shreya Ghoshal	
2017	Chowka	"Turthinalli Geechida"	Sridhar V. Sambhram	Jayanth Kaikini	Antara Mitra	
2017	Raajakumara	"Saagarada Alegu"	V. Harikrishna	Ghouse Peer		
2017	Mugulu Nage	"Roopasi Summane"	V. Harikrishna	Jayanth Kaikini		
2017	Mugulu Nage	"Mugulu Nage"	V. Harikrishna	Yogaraj Bhat		
2017	Mugulu Nage	"Kere Yeri"	V. Harikrishna	Yogaraj Bhat		
2017	Raju Kannada Medium	"Kodeyondara"	Kiran Ravindranath	Hrudaya Shiva		
2017	Raju Kannada Medium	"Ekangi Haadinali"	Kiran Ravindranath	Hrudaya Shiva		
2017	Kariya 2	"Naa Kaayuthiruve"	Karan B. Krupa	Jayanth Kaikini		
2017	Manasu Mallige	"Lokavella"	S. Narayan	K. Kalyan		
2017	Maasthi Gudi	"Chippinolagade"	Sadhu Kokila	Kaviraj	Shreya Ghoshal	
2017	Maasthi Gudi	"Ondu Huduga"	Sadhu Kokila	Kaviraj		
2017	Bangara s/o Bangarada Manushya	"Neeli Neeli"	V. Harikrishna	V. Nagendra Prasad	Anuradha Bhat	
2017	Tiger	"Bedadingla Ratri"	Arjun Janya		Anuradha Bhat	
2017	Simha Hakida Hejje	"Ee Khali Hyudayake"	R Haribabu			
2017	First Love	"Kanasina Kitakiya"	V. Sridhar			
2018	3 Gante 30 Dina 30 Second	"Arda Chandra"			Sriraksha	
2018	O Premave	"Gari Gedari"	Anand Rajavikram, Rahul Dev	Jayanth Kaikini	Shreya Ghoshal	
2018	Kannadakkaagi Ondannu Otti	"Nana Mele Nanageega"				
2018	Kinare	"Eruveya Eruveya Sanihave Neenu"				
2018	Dhwaja	"Agala Eshto Aakasha"			Shweta Mohan	
2018	Seetha Vallabha (Serial)	Serial Title Track				
2018	Yaarige Yaruntu	"Yentha Ashcharya Kande"				
2019	Yajamana	"Ondu Munjane"	V. Harikrishna		Shreya Ghoshal	
2019	Gara	"Naa Viraha"	Sagar Gururaj		Sangeetha Gururaj	
2019	99	"Nee Gnyapaka"	Arjun Janya		Palak Muchhal	
2019	Amar	"Summane Heege"	Arjun Janya		Shreya Ghoshal	
2019	Amar	"Kambani"	Arjun Janya		Shreya Ghoshal	
2019	Naanu Matthu Gunda	"Naanu Matthu Gunda"				
2019	Kurukshetra	"Chaaruthanthi"	V. Harikrishna	V. Nagendra Prasad	Shreya Ghoshal	
2019	Ellidde Illi Tanaka	"Ellidde Illi Tanaka"	Arjun Janya	Kaviraj		
2019	Geetha	"Geetha Nanna Geetha"	Anup Rubens			
2019	Odeya	"Kaaneyagirive Naanu"	Arjun Janya			

=== 2020s ===
Year	Film	Song	Composer(s)	Writer(s)	Co-artist(s)
2021	Inspector Vikram	"Nannavale Nannavale" " O Hrudaya " " Soumya Ve "	J. Anoop Seelin		Manasa Holla, Anuradha Paudwal, Anoop seelin
2021	SriKrishna@gmail.com	"Bhetiyaade Yaake Nanna" " Nee Nanna" " Kanasina " "Anisuthide" " Preetisuvey" "Bechchhane" "Kambani"	Arjun Janya		shreya Ghoshal
2021	Premam Poojyam	"O Baana Modagale" "O Baana Modagale" "Ambari Nanna Prema" "Premave" "Banna Banna"	Raghavendra BS		shreya Ghoshal
2021	Yellow Board	"Preethiye"	Advik		rajesh Krishnan
2021	Yellow Board	"Preethiye"(Sad)	Advik		
2022	Ek Love Ya	"Matte Nodabeda" "Matte Nodbeda" "Hindeye" "Beladingala"	Arjun Janya		Saindhavi
2022	Radha Ramana	"Phala Phala Kannalli"	Navanith Chari		
2022	Manku Bhai Foxy Rani	"Minchanthe Minuguthiro"	Shameer Mudipu	Yogish AN	
2022	Gaalipata 2	"Naanaadadaa"	Arjun Janya	Jayant Kaikini	
2022	Gaalipata 2	"Prayashaha"	Arjun Janya	Yogaraj Bhat	
2022	Raymo	"Thareyo Koti"	Arjun Janya	Kaviraj	
2022	Triple Riding	"Nijave Athava"	Sai Kartheek	Jayant Kaikini	Saras Chandrika
2022	Made in Bengaluru	"Olavu"	Ashwin P Kumar	Pradeep K Sastry	
2022	Bond Ravi	"Sahaja Sakhi"	Mano Murthy	Jayant Kaikini	
2022	Bond Ravi	"Male Suridu"	Mano Murthy		
2023	5D	"Pisu Pisu Mathu"	S. Narayan		
2023	Sambhrama	"Parimalavanu Beeruva"	Mano Murthy	Jayant Kaikini	
2023	Kranti	"Bombe Bombe"	V Harikrishna	Yogaraj Bhat	
2023	Baanadariyalli	"Ninnanu Nodida"	Arjun Janya	Kaviraj	
2023	Kousalya Supraja Rama	"Preethisuve"	Arjun Janya		Prithwi Bhat
2023	Melody Drama	"Endu Endendu"	Kiran Ravichandran		
2023	Melody Drama	"Ondu Bechchane"	Kiran Ravichandran		
2023	Animal	"Nanna Ravi Neene"	Harshavardhan Rameshwar	Varadaraj Chikkaballapura	
2024	Pranayam	"Malegaala Bantu"	Mano Murthy	Jayant Kaikini	
2024	Pranayam	"Ninage Sigalu Ee Dina"	Mano Murthy	Jayant Kaikini	
2024	Sanju Weds Geetha 2	"Ee Sanjege"	Sridhar V. Sambhram	Kaviraj	
2024	Sanju Weds Geetha 2	"Nadi Nadi Endu"	Sridhar V. Sambhram	Kaviraj	Sangeetha Ravindranath
2024	Sanju Weds Geetha 2	"Avanu Sanju Avalu Geetha"	Sridhar V. Sambhram	Kaviraj	Sangeetha Ravindranath
2024	Krishnam Pranaya Sakhi	"Hey Gagana"	Arjun Janya	V. Nagendra Prasad	Chinmayi Sripaada
2024	Martin	"Jeeva Neene"	Mani Sharma	A. P. Arjun	Shruthika Samudrala
2024	Hagga	"Haavali Haakide"	Yogaraj Bhat	Mathews Manu	
2025	Kanasondu Shuruvaagide	"Aaja Re Aaja Re"			
2025	Nidradevi Next Door	"Nee Nanna"	Nakul Abhyankar		
2025	Maadeva	"Jeeva Ondu"			shreya Ghoshal, Udit Narayan, Shaan, Neha Sharma, Shaan, Shreya Ghoshal, Udit Narayan, Shaan, Jubeen Natial, Vishal Dadlani, Arijit Singh, Kunal Ganjawala, Gurukiran, Arjun Janya, Tippu, karthik, Shaan, Shreya Ghoshal, Udit Narayan, Shaan, Shreya Ghoshal, Kunal Ganjawala, Gurukiran, Arjun Janya, Tippu, karthik, Shaan, Anuradha Paudwal, Anuradha Sriram, Anuradha Bhat
2025	Maarutha	"Ondsala Meet Maadona"			
2025	Love U Muddu	"Love You Muddu"			Aishwarya Rangarajan, Surabhi Bharadwaj, Rajesh Krishnan, Vijay Prakash, Hemanth Kumar, Tippu, karthik, Shaan, Shreya Ghoshal, Udit Narayan, Anoop Seelin, Kunal Ganjawala, Gurukiran, Arjun Janya

== Kannada non-film songs ==
Year	Album	Song	Composer(s)	Writer(s)	Co-artist(s)
2009	Neene Bari Neene	"Innu Anisuthide"	Mano Murthy	Jayanth Kaikini	
2009	Neene Bari Neene	"Naa Ninagaagi"	Mano Murthy	Jayanth Kaikini	
2009	Neene Bari Neene	"Neene Bari Neene"	Mano Murthy	Jayanth Kaikini	
2009	Neene Bari Neene	"Ninna Hindeye"	Mano Murthy	Jayanth Kaikini	
2009	Neene Bari Neene	"Beku Beku"	Mano Murthy	Jayanth Kaikini	
2009	Neene Bari Neene	"Baa Nodu Gelati"	Mano Murthy	Jayanth Kaikini	
2009	Neene Bari Neene	"Eega Bandiruve"	Mano Murthy	Jayanth Kaikini	
2009	Neene Bari Neene	"Ideye Ninage Samaya"	Mano Murthy	Jayanth Kaikini	
2009	Neene Bari Neene	"Haaduntu Namma Naadali"	Mano Murthy	Jayanth Kaikini	
2024	Bhoomi 2024	"Mayavi"	Sanjith Hegde	Nagarjuna Sharma	Sanjith Hegde

== Bengali songs ==
Year	Film	Song	Composer(s)	Writer(s)	Co-artist(s)
1995	Rakhal Raja	"Pran Kamde Rakhal Bondhure"	Ashok Bhadra	N/A	Sabina Yasmin
1997	Mittir Barir Chhoto Bou	"Shopno Amar Shotti Hoye Jay"	Anupam Dutta	Tapas Dutta	Alka Yagnik
1997	Nishpapa Asami	"Tumi Tumi Kore Ei Monta"	Ashok Bhadra	Pulak Banerjee	Anupama Deshpande
1997	Tomake Chai	"Piritir Pagol Hawa"	Ashok Bhadra	Pulak Banerjee	Mitali Mukherjee
1998	Soldier (Dubbed)	"Keno Tomake Dekhe Mon Manena"	Anu Malik		Jaspinder Narula
1999	Chena Achena	"Ekti Shalik Dekhini Toh"	Anupam Dutta	Pulak Banerjee	Sadhana Sargam
2000	Madhur Milan	"Dole Re Kishori"	Babul Bose	N/A	solo
2000	Madhur Milan	"Gaanete Keno Phirbe Na Mon"	Babul Bose	N/A	solo
2001	Bangshadhar	"O Miss, Miss Korona"			solo
2001	Guru Shisya	"Prothom Ushar Prothom Dhara"	Babul Bose	Gautam Sushmit	solo
2001	Sud Asol	"Rotone Roton Chine"	Emon Saha	Gautam Sushmit	solo
2004	Premi	"Jar Chabi Eai Mon Enke Jai"	Jeet Gannguli	Gautam Sushmit	
2004	Premi	"Mone Rekho Amar Ea Gaan" (Male version)	Jeet Gannguli	Gautam Sushmit	
2004	Premi	"Mone Rekho Amar Ea Gaan" (Duet version)	Jeet Gannguli	Gautam Sushmit	Shreya Ghoshal
2004	Bandhan	"Aaj Tomai Niye Suru Halo"	Jeet Gannguli	Gautam Sushmit	Sadhana Sargam
2004	Bandhan	"Je Kothati Mone Rekhechi"	Jeet Gannguli	Gautam Sushmit	Shreya Ghoshal
2004	Bandhan	"Kichu Hashi Kichu Asha"	Jeet Gannguli	Gautam Sushmit	
2004	Bandhan	"Tokey Niye Banchbo Aami"	Jeet Gannguli	Gautam Sushmit	
2005	Yuddho	"Sure Sure Aaj O Mon"	Jeet Gannguli	Gautam Sushmit	Babul Supriyo, Shreya Ghoshal, Sahdana Sargam, Jeet Gannguli
2005	Yuddho	"Kichu Asha Khoje Bhasa"	Jeet Gannguli	Priyo Chattopadhyay	Shreya Ghoshal
2005	Yuddho	"Baisakhete Prothom Dekha"	Jeet Gannguli	Gautam Susmit	Shreya Ghoshal
2005	Yuddho	"Raat Name Du Chokh"	Jeet Gannguli		Shreya Ghoshal
2005	Raju Uncle	"Raat Naame"	Ashok Raj		solo
2005	Raju Uncle	"Shopner Deshete"	Ashok Raj		solo
2005	Shubhodrishti	"Mon Rage Onurage"	Jeet Ganguly	Priyo Chattopadhyay	
2006	Hero	"Bhalobasa Aalo Aasha"	Jeet Ganguly	Priyo Chattopadhyay	
2006	Hero	"Bhalo Lage Swapnoke"	Jeet Ganguly	Priyo Chattopadhyay	Shreya Ghoshal
2006	Nayak	"Sobar Jibone Ase Ei Shubhodin"	Jeet Ganguly	Priyo Chattopadhyay	Shreya Ghoshal
2006	Eri Naam Prem	"I Love You"	Jeet Ganguly	Priyo Chattopadhyay	
2006	Agni Shapath	"Mon Ore Mon Amar"	Amit Dasgupta		
2007	I Love You	"Chalre Chalre Bhai"			
2007	I Love You	"Mon Mane Na"	Lalit Pandit	Gautam Sushmit	
2007	Bidhatar Lekha	"Bidhatar Lekha"	Lalit Pandit	Gautam Sushmit	Alka Yagnik
2007	Bidhatar Lekha	"Bidhar Lekha" (remix)	Lalit Pandit	Gautam Sushmit	Alka Yagnik
2007	Bidhatar Lekha	"Tumi Amar Jibon Sathi"	Lalit Pandit	Gautam Sushmit	Alka Yagnik
2007	Bidhatar Lekha	"Tumi Amar Jibon Sathi" (male)	Lalit Pandit	Gautam Sushmit	
2009	Saat Paake Bandha	"Bolo Priya"(Male Version)	Lalit Pandit		
2010	Amanush	"Hay Rama"			
2010	Sobar Upore Tumi		Devendranath Chattopadhyay, Alauddin Ali	Munshi Wadud	Priya Bhattacharya
2010	Sobar Upore Tumi		Devendranath Chattopadhyay, Alauddin Ali	Munshi Wadud	solo
2011	Romeo	"Ghum Ghum Oi Chokhe"	Chandrani Gannguli		Shreya Ghoshal
2012	Premleela	"Chokher Ei Bashate"		Sadhana Sargam	
2013	Mishawr Rawhoshyo	"Hani Alkadi R Gaan"	Indraadip Dasgupta	Srijato	
2014	Force	"Force"	N/A	N/A	solo
2014	Force	"Palabi Aay"	N/A	N/A	solo
2016	Tobu Aporichito	"Din Jay Raat Jay"	Kumar Sanu	Goutam Susmit	
2016	Abhimaan	"Saiyaan"	N/A	N/A	solo
2017	Inspector Notty K	"Bhul Ja Ami"	Pranjol		
2018	Piya Re	"Piya Re"	Jeet Ganguly	N/A	solo
2018	Bagh Bandi Khela	"Tor Neshay"	Jeet Gannguli	Ritam Sen	Shreya Ghoshal
2019	Gumnaami	"Subhasji (Hindi song)"			solo
2022	Kacher Manush	"Mukti Dao"	Nilayan Chatterjee	Nilayan Chatterjee	solo
2023	Oh! Lovely	"Mayabi Thikanay"	Suvam Subhankar	Dipangshu Acharya	solo
2023	Manush	"Aador Diye Chui"	Savvy	Srijato	solo
2024	Pariah	"Pariah Anthem"	Ranajoy Bhattacharjee	Ritam Sen	solo
2024	Boomerang	"Adwitiya"	Nilayan Chatterjee		solo
2024	Hungama.com	"Tor E Sathe"	Savvy	Ritam Sen	Antara Mitra

=== Non-film songs ===
Year	Album	Song	Composer(s)	Co-artist(s)
2000	Tomar Apekkhay	"Bosrai Golap"	Arup Pranay	solo
2000	Tomar Apekkhay	"Ei Je Akash"	Arup Pranay	solo
2000	Tomar Apekkhay	"Je Jaane Se Jaane"	Arup Pranay	solo
2000	Tomar Apekkhay	"Jochonay Jay Bhore"	Arup Pranay	solo
2000	Tomar Apekkhay	"Ogo O Sagor"	Arup Pranay	solo
2000	Tomar Apekkhay	"Shona Re Shona Re"	Arup Pranay	solo
2000	Tomar Apekkhay	"Sundori Dhakai Sharite"	Arup Pranay	solo
2000	Tomar Apekkhay	"Ora Manbe Na"	Arup Pranay	solo
2010	Fele Asha Bhalobasha	"Bhabeshe Sukhi Hote"		solo
2010	Fele Asha Bhalobasha	"Jani Tumi Ghumate Paroni"		solo
2010	Fele Asha Bhalobasha	"Majhraate Ghum Amar"		solo
2010	Fele Asha Bhalobasha	"Koto Debe Aar Koshto"		solo
2010	Fele Asha Bhalobasha	"Fele Asha Bhalobasha"		solo
2010	Fele Asha Bhalobasha	"Akasher Sobtuku Nil"		solo
2010	Fele Asha Bhalobasha	"Etota Din Etota Bochor"		solo
2010	Fele Asha Bhalobasha	"Ami Kemon Kore"		solo
2010	Fele Asha Bhalobasha	"Bhalobeshe Ekhon"		solo
2010	Fele Asha Bhalobasha	"Shesh Chithi"		solo
2015	Dushtu Chokje Mishti Hashi	"Ramdhanu Rang"	Babul Bose	Moushumi
2015	Dushtu Chokje Mishti Hashi	"Ei Jadi Hoy"	Babul Bose	Moushumi

== Marathi songs ==
Year	Film	Song	Composer(s)	Writer(s)	Co-singer(s)
2004	Navra Maza Navsacha	"Hirwa Nisarga"	Jitendra Kulkarni	Jagdish Khebudkar	
2008	Aamhi Satpute	"Amhi Prema Madhi Padloya"	Jitendra Kulkarni	Pravin Davane	
2013	Ekulti Ek	"Kare Maya Vedi"	Jitendra Kulkarni	Pravin Davane	Solo
2013	Ekulti Ek	"Ekulti Ek"	Jitendra Kulkarni	Kshitij Patwardhan	Solo
2013	Duniyadari	"Tik Tik Vajate Dokyaat (Male)"	Pankaj Padghan	Mangesh Kangane	Sayali Pankaj, Vaibhav Patole
2013	Shrimant Damodar Pant	"Matching Navra"	Vaishali Samant	Vaibhav Joshi	Vaishali Samant
2014	Lai Bhaari	"Jeev Bhulala"	Ajay–Atul	Guru Thakur	Shreya Ghoshal
2014	Sanngto Aika	"Datale Abhaal"	Avinash-Vishwajeet	Damyanti Wagh	Bela Shende
2014	Sanngto Aika	"Datale Abhaal" (Male Version)	Avinash-Vishwajeet	Damyanti Wagh	Solo
2014	Bhatukali	"Tara Tara"	Jasraj-Saurabh-Rishikesh	Kshitij Patwardhan	Solo
2014	Por Baazar	"Limbu Timbu"	Shailendra Barve	Mandar Cholkar	Solo
2014	Miss Match	"Ashi Lajri"	Neeraj	Ashish Pant	Bela Shende
2015	Classmates	"Swapna Chalun Aale"	Pankaj Padghan	Kshitij Patwardhan	Sayali Pankaj
2015	Online Binline	"Tu Havishi"	Nilesh Moharir	Mandar Cholkar	Priyanka Barve
2016	Marathi Tigers	"Hur Hur Laage Shwasana"	Swapnil H Digde	Mandar Cholkar	Astha Tripathi
2016	Cheater	"I Love You"	Abhijeet Narvekar	Akhil Joshi	Solo
2016	Cheater	"Man Majhe"	Abhijeet Narvekar	Akhil Joshi	Solo
2016	Jaundya Na Balasaheb	"Mona Darling"	Ajay–Atul	Vaibhav Joshi	Suman Sridhar, Shreya Ghoshal, Kunal Ganjawala
2017	Anaan	"Gandhi Sugandhi"	Saurabh-Durgesh	Rajesh Kushte	Aanandi Joshi
2017	Bhikari	"Aai"	Milind Wankhede	Milind Wankhede, Subodh Pawar, Guru Thakur	Solo
2017	Bhikari	"Aai" (Slow Version)	Milind Wankhede	Milind Wankhede, Subodh Pawar, Guru Thakur	Solo
2017	Deva	"Roj Roj Navyane"(Duet)	Amitraj	Guru Thakur	Shreya Ghoshal
2017	Deva	"Roj Roj Navyane"(Male)	Amitraj	Guru Thakur	Solo
2017	FU: Friendship Unlimited	"Tujhya Vina O Yara"	Vishal Mishra	Pranav Vasta	Solo
2017	Kaay Re Rascalaa	"Kohinoor"	Rohan-Rohan	Jay Atre	Meenal Jain
2017	Zindagi Virat	"Makhmali"	Suraj – Dhiraj	Mandar Cholkar	Shreya Ghoshal
2018	Hostel Days	"Haat Sutale Naate Tutale"	Ajay Kishor Naik	Ajay Kishor Naik	Solo
2018	Truckbhar Swapna	"Luklukle Swapna"	Shreyashh	Shreyashh	Aanandi Joshi
2019	Aasud	"Paakharanchi Kil Bil"	Anu Malik	Adv. Anant Kelkar	Solo
2019	Ashi Hi Ashiqui	"Rakamma"	Sachin Palgaonkar	Abhishek Khankar	Sachin Pilgaonkar
2019	Ashi Hi Ashiqui	"Teri Meri Meri Teri"(Duet)	Sachin Palgaonkar		Priyanka Barve
2019	Ashi Hi Ashiqui	"Kalalay Mala"	Sachin Palgaonkar		Janhavi Prabhu Arora
2019	Ashi Hi Ashiqui	"Lori"(Male)	Sachin Palgaonkar		Solo
2019	Ashi Hi Ashiqui	"Samjhe Kya"	Sachin Palgaonkar		Shanmukha Priya
2019	Ashi Hi Ashiqui	"Lori"(Part ll)	Sachin Palgaonkar		Solo
2019	Baalaa	"Ladalya"	Mahesh – Rakesh		
2019	Berij Vajabaki	"Kshan Ha Virala"	Abhijeet Narvekar		
2019	Dhumas	"Man Bharun Aalaya"	P Shankaram		Shreya Ghoshal
2019	Mann Udhan Wara	"Ase Kase Harpun Gele"	Satish Chakravarthy		
2019	Miss U Mister	"Yeshil Tu"	Alap Desai		
2019	Premwaari	"Baghata Tula Mi"	Amitraj		Shreya Ghoshal
2019	Senior Citizen	"Nasha"	Abhijeet Narvekar		
2019	Triple Seat	"Kay Tu"	Ashwini Shende		
2020	Prawaas	"Prawaas"(Male)	Salim–Sulaiman	Guru Thakur	
2020	Tattaad	"Allad Hullad"	Rohit Nagbhide		
2022	Aathva Rang Premacha	"Manala"	Prini Siddhant Madhav	Jai Atre	
2022	Boyz 3	"Manaat Shirali"	Avadhoot Gupte	Sameer Samant	
2023	Raundal	"Baap Gela Dur Deshi"	Harsshit Abhiraj	Vinayak Pawa	
2023	Ekda Yeun Tar Bagha	"Masti Chi Safar"	Kashyap Sompura	Manndar Cholkar	Sriparna Chatterrjee
2024	Navra Maza Navsacha 2	"Supari Phutali"	Jitendra Kulkarni		
2025	Sangeet Manapmaan	"Chandrika"	Shankar–Ehsaan–Loy	Sameer Samant	
2025	Hardik Shubhechha	"O Bawari"	Rohan-Rohan	Manndar Cholkar	
2025	April May 99	"Mann Jaie"	Rohan-Rohan	Prashant Madpuwar, Rohan Pradhan	
2025	Better Half Chi Love Story	"Tuch Aahe"	Rohan-Rohan	Sanjay Amar	
2025	Devmanus	"Panduranga"	Rohan-Rohan	Prashant Madpuwar	
2026	Tighee	Haas Jarashi	Advait Nemlekar	Jitendra Joshi	Solo

== Telugu songs ==
Year	Film	No	Song	Composer(s)	Lyricist(s)	Co-artist(s)	Note
1998	Jeans	1	"Raave Naa Cheliya"	A. R. Rahman	Siva Ganesh	Harini	Dubbed film
1998	Abhishekam	2	"Kannepilla"	S. V. Krishna Reddy			
1999	Ravoyi Chandamama	3	"Love To Live"	Mani Sharma	Veturi Sundara Ramamurhty	Kavita Krishnamurti	
1999	Swayamvaram	4	"Vinave Cheli"	Vandemataram Srinivas	Bhuvana Chandra	Arundathi	
2000	Uncle	5	"Kurraallam Kurraallam"	Vandemataram Srinivas	AVS		
2000	Manasunna Maaraju	6	"O Prema"	Vandemataram Srinivas	Sirivennela Sitaramasastri		
2000	Jayam Manadera	7	"Happyga Jollyga"	Vandemataram Srinivas	Veturi Sundara Ramamurhty	Gopika Poornima	
2000	Ammo Okato Tareekhu	8	"Preyasi I Love You"	Vandemataram Srinivas	Bhuvana Chandra	Sunitha Upadrashta	
2001	Ammayi Kosam	9	"Ding Dong"	Vandemataram Srinivas	Chandrabose	Timmy	
2001	Orey Thammudu	10	"Koteeswarudivi Kaakunna"	Vandemataram Srinivas	Chirravuri Vijaykumar		
2001	Ninnu Choodalani	11	"Ennallo Vechaka"	S. A. Rajkumar	Bhuvana Chandra	Anuradha Sriram	
2002	Priya Nestama	12	"Vennelalo Thiragali"	Bharani	Suddala Ashok Teja	Kavita Krishnamurti	
2002	Apuroopam	13	"Jaarekannera"	Chakri	Sirivennela Sitaramasastri		
2002	Lahiri Lahiri Lahirilo	14	"Nesthama"	M. M. Keeravani	Sirivennela Sitaramasastri	Sunitha Upadrashta	
2003	Praanam	15	"Nindu Noorella"	Kamalakar	Sri Sai Harsha	Mahalakshmi Iyer	
2003	Vishnu	16	"Nee Peru Thana Paina"	Ismail Darbar	Suddala Ashokteja		
2004	Adavi Ramudu	17	"Aakasam Sakshiga"	Mani Sharma	Sirivennela Sitaramasastri	Mahalakshmi Iyer	
2004	Prema Nagar	18	"Jhamu Jhamu"	Anu Malik	Viswa		Dubbed film
2004	Prema Nagar	19	"LOVE Ke"	Anu Malik	Veturi	Sadhana Sargam	Dubbed film
2004	Maayam	20	"Nuvvunte"	Ajay–Atul			Dubbed film
2005	Orey Pandu	21	"Raaleva Raaleva"	Anand Raj Anand	Bhuvana Chandra	Shreya Ghoshal	
2005	Orey Pandu	22	"Aakasha Veedhilo"	Anand Raj Anand		Mahalakshmi Iyer	
2005	Sada Mee Sevalo	23	"Ee Dooram"	Vandemataram Srinivas	Kandikonda	Shreya Ghoshal	
2005	Super	24	"Mudduletti"	Bhaskarabhatla	Sonu Kakkar		
2005	Nuvvante Naakishtam	25	"Manasichav Anuko"	Koti	Sai Sri Harsha	Sadhana Sargam, S. P. Balasubrahmanyam	
2005	Nuvvante Naakishtam	26	"Nee Navvu Poolavanam"	Koti	Kandikonda	Sangeetha	
2005	James	27	"Udayinche Kiranalu"	Nithin Raikwar, Amar Mohile, Prasanna Shekar	Kona Venkat	Shweta Pandit	Dubbed film
2005	James	28	"Naa Gundello"	Nithin Raikwar, Amar Mohile, Prasanna Shekar	Kona Venkat	Shweta Pandit	Dubbed film
2005	James	29	"Akasam Sinduramai"	Nithin Raikwar, Amar Mohile, Prasanna Shekar	Kona Venkat	Shweta Pandit	Dubbed film
2005	Political Rowdy	30	"Kallu Therichi Choosha"	Sandeep Chowta	Suddala Ashok Teja	Teesha Nigam	
2005	Modati Cinema	31	"Urime Megham"	Swarag	Sirivennela Sitaramasastri	K. S. Chithra	
2006	Krrish	32	"Katha Vintava"	Rajesh Roshan	Rajasri Sudhakar	Shreya Ghoshal	Dubbed film
2006	Krrish	33	"Nuvvu Puttinadi"	Rajesh Roshan	Rajasri Sudhakar	Shreya Ghoshal	Dubbed film
2006	Krrish	34	"Big Band Mix"	Rajesh Roshan	Rajasri Sudhakar	Shreya Ghoshal	Dubbed film
2007	Anumanaspadam	35	"Ragummara"	Ilaiyaraaja	Veturi Sundara Ramamurhty		
2008	Ullasamga Utsahamga	36	"Priyatama"	G. V. Prakash Kumar	Anantha Sriram	Rahul Nambiar	
2008	Chintakayala Ravi	37	"Enduko Tholi"	Vishal–Shekhar	Chandrabose	Mahalakshmi Iyer	
2009	Konchem Ishtam Konchem Kashtam	38	"Antha Siddhanga"	Shankar–Ehsaan–Loy	Sirivennela Sitaramasastri	Shreya Ghoshal	
2010	Varudu	39	"Bahusa Vo Chanchalaa"	Mani Sharma	Veturi Sundara Ramamurhty	Shreya Ghoshal	
2010	1947: A Love Story	40	"O Prema"	G. V. Prakash Kumar	Sahithi	Saindhavi	Dubbed film
2011	Cricket Girls & Beer	41	"Gunday Chattu Badhey"	Das, Shyam Vai	Satish Banala		
2012	Saguni	42	"Manasulo Madhuve"	G. V. Prakash Kumar	Na. Muthukumar	Saindhavi, G. V. Prakash Kumar	Dubbed film
2012	Shirdi Sai	43	"Datthatreyuni"	M. M. Keeravani	Vedavyasa	Teesha Nigam	
2015	Gopala Gopala	44	"Needhe Needhe"	Anup Rubens	Sirivennela Sitaramasastri		
2018	Lover	45	"What A Ammayi"	Arko	Sri Mani		
2022	Laal Singh Chaddha	46	"Main Ki Karaan"(Telugu Version)	Pritam	Bhaskarabhatla	Romy	Dubbed film
2022	Laal Singh Chaddha	47	"Kahaani"(Telugu Version)	Pritam			Dubbed film
2022	Gurthunda Seethakalam	48	"Anaganaga"	Kaala Bhairava	ShreeMani		
2023	Animal	49	"Nanna Nuv Naa Pranam"	Harshavardhan Rameshwar	Anantha Sriram		Dubbed film

== Tamil songs ==
Year	No	Film	Song	Composer(s)	Lyricist(s)	Co-artist(s)	Note
1998	1	Jeans	"Vaarayo Thozhi"	A. R. Rahman	Vairamuthu	Shahul Hameed, Harini, Sangeetha	
2000	2	Parthen Rasithen	"Poove Punnagai"	Bharadwaj	Vairamuthu	Vasundhara Das	
2001	3	Kadhale Swasam	"Sokude Kaadhal"	D. Imman	Thyagu	K. S. Chithra	Unreleased film
2001	4	Kadhale Swasam	"Summa Iru"	D. Imman		Mathangi	Unreleased film
2005	5	Mumbai Xpress	"Poo Poothathu"	Ilaiyaraaja	Vaali	Shreya Ghoshal, Shaan	
2005	6	Mumbai Xpress	"Yelae Nee Yetipoo"	Ilaiyaraaja	Vaali	Kamal Haasan, Shaan, Sunidhi Chauhan, Shreya Ghoshal	
2005	7	Oru Naal Oru Kanavu	"Enna Paattu"	Ilaiyaraaja	Palani Bharathi		
2005	8	Oru Naal Oru Kanavu	"Elamaikku"	Ilaiyaraaja	Vaali		
2005	9	Oru Naal Oru Kanavu	"Konjam Thira"	Ilaiyaraaja	Vaali	Shreya Ghoshal	
2006	10	Krrish	"Un Pol Yaarum Illai"	Rajesh Roshan	Piraisoodan	Shreya Ghoshal	Dubbed film
2006	11	Krrish	"Then Vadikkum"	Rajesh Roshan	Piraisoodan	Shreya Ghoshal	Dubbed film
2006	12	Krrish	"Big Band Mix"	Rajesh Roshan		Shreya Ghoshal	Dubbed film
2007	13	Kireedam	"Vizhiyil Un Vizhiyil"	G. V. Prakash Kumar	Na. Muthukumar	Shweta Mohan	
2010	14	Madarasapattinam	"Aaruyire"	G. V. Prakash Kumar	Na. Muthukumar	Saindhavi	
2012	15	Saguni	"Manasellam Mazhaiye"	G. V. Prakash Kumar	Na. Muthukumar	Saindhavi	
2018	16	Sei	"Nadiga Nadigaa"	NyX Lopez	Madhan Karky	Shreya Ghoshal	
2018	17	Sei	"Nadiga Nadigaa"(Unplugged)	NyX Lopez	Madhan Karky	Shreya Ghoshal	
2022	18	Laal Singh Chaddha	"Main Ki Karaan"(Tamil Version)	Pritam	Muthamil	Romy	Dubbed film
2022	19	Laal Singh Chaddha	"Kahani"(Tamil Version)	Pritam			Dubbed film
2023	20	Animal	"Nee En Ulagam"	Harshavardhan Rameshwar	Mohan Rajan		Dubbed film

== Odia songs ==
=== Film songs ===
Year	Film	#	Song	Composer(s)	Lyricist(s)	Co-artist(s)	Ref
1995	Suna Panjuri	1	"Puchuki Gali"				
1995	Suna Panjuri	2	"Huku Huku Haaye"			Kavita Krishnamurti	
1995	Suna Panjuri	3	"Sunara Chadhei Udi Udi Aasi"			Kavita Krishnamurti	
1996	Laxman Rekha	4	"Nache A Mana Nache"	Akshaya Mohanty		Sadhana Sargam, Suresh Wadkar	
1996	Laxman Rekha	5	"Kichi Kichi Hauchi"	Akshaya Mohanty		Kavita Krishnamurthy	
1996	Laxman Rekha	6	"Dhak Dhak Mo Mana"	Akshaya Mohanty		Sadhana Sargam	
1997	Kandhei Akhire Luha	7	"Chulubuli Chulubuli"	Amarendra Mohanty	Sirsanada	Anuradha Paudwal	
1999	Dharma Nikiti	8	"To Chalire Bombay Thumka"	Deepak Kumar		Poornima	
1999	Pabitra Bandhana	9	"Tume Mo Phula Mu Tuma Phaguna"	Akshaya Mohanty		Sadhana Sargam	
1999	Pabitra Bandhana	10	"Dekhini Mo Tu Pari Ete"	Akshaya Mohanty		Sadhana Sargam	
1999	To Aakhi Mo Aaina	11	"Gori jhumuru jhumuru"			Pamela Jain	
1999	To Aakhi Mo Aaina	12	"To Aakhi Mo Aaina"(Title track)			Pamela Jain	
2001	Dharma Debata	13	"Aare Aare Aa Aji Debi"	Amarendra Mohanty		Sadhana Sargam	
2001	Dharma Debata	14	"Rani Lo Rani"	Amarendra Mohanty		Sadhana Sargam	
2001	Dharma Debata	15	"Chakiri Chakiri Buluchi Re"	Amarendra Mohanty		Sonali Bajpayee	
2001	Dharma Debata	16	"Ilu Ilu Ilala Aei"	Amarendra Mohanty		Sonali Bajpayee	

=== Non-film songs ===
Year	Album	#	Song	Composer(s)	Lyricist(s)	Co-artist(s)
2000	Kalia Panakhia	1	"Bajare Ghantua"	Biju Swain	Alkesh Biswal	
2000	Kalia Panakhia	2	"To Singha Duare"	Biju Swain	Alkesh Biswal	

== Malayalam songs ==
Year	Film	#	Song	Composer(s)	Lyricist(s)	Co-artist(s)
2010	Kandahar	1	"Aye Janani"	Shamir Tandon	Sandeep Nath	
2011	Bombay March 12	2	"Chakkara Maavin"	Afzal Yusuf	Rafeeq Ahamed	Ganesh Sundaram
2011	Bombay March 12	3	"Chakkara Maavin"	Afzal Yusuf	Rafeeq Ahamed	Soney Sai, Ganesh Sundaram
2014	8:20	4	"Thoomanjin Kulirilo"	Alex Kayyalaykkal	Engandiyoor Chandrasekharan	
2014	8:20	5	"Thoomanjin Kulirilo"(Acoustic version)	Alex Kayyalaykkal	Engandiyoor Chandrasekharan	

== Gujarati songs ==
Year	Film	#	Song	Composer(s)	Lyricist(s)	Co-artist(s)
2000	Piyu Gayo Pardesh	1	"Deshane Kadin Bhuli Javay"	Jaikar Bhojak	Kanubhai Chauhan	
2016	Romance Complicated	2	"Ishq Rang"	Jatin–Pratik	Dashrath Mewal	Aishwarya Majmudar
2019	Chaal Jeevi Laiye!	3	"Pa Pa Pagli"	Sachin–Jigar	Niren Bhatt	
2022	Vickida No Varghodo	4	"Udi Re"	Amar Khandha	Niren Bhatt	
2022	Bhagwan Bachave	5	"Kone Khabar"	Bhavesh Shah	Milind Gadhavi	

== Bhojpuri songs ==
Year	Film	#	Song	Composer(s)	Lyricist(s)	Co-artist(s)
2006	Humka Aisa Waisa Na Samjha	1	"Pyar Karab Bhojpuri Mein"	Ajay Prasanna		
2006	Humka Aisa Waisa Na Samjha	2	"Deshwa Ke Aan Auvar Baan"	Ajay Prasanna		
2011	Deswa	3	"Chanarma Mein Daag"	Ashutosh Singh	Santosh Kumar Gupta	
2011	Deswa	4	"Suna Suna"	Ashutosh Singh	Santosh Kumar Gupta	Shreya Ghoshal

== Tulu songs ==
Year	Film	#	Song	Composer(s)	Lyricist(s)	Co-artist(s)
2014	Madime	1	"Nenpapunda A Dina"	AK Vijay Kokila	Vijaykumar Kodialbail	
2015	Dhand	2	"Ninna Teliken"	Abhishek S N	Loku Kudla	

== Nepali songs ==
Year	Film	#	Song	Composer(s)	Lyricist(s)	Co-artist(s)
1996	Simana	1	"Ukali Orali Gardai"	Shakti Ballav	Ratna Shamsher Thapa	
1996	Simana	2	"Phool Ko Dali Dali Ma"	Shakti Ballav	Ratna Shamsher Thapa	Poornima
2001	Badalpari	3	"Yo Jindagile"	Sambhujeet Baskota	Surendra Rana	

== Punjabi songs ==
Year	Film	No	Song	Composer(s)	Writer(s)	Co-Singer(s)	Note
2025	Akaal: The Unconquered	1	"Satnam Waheguru"	Shankar Ehsaan Loy	Happy Raikoti	Shankar Mahadevan	

== Assamese songs ==
=== Film songs ===
Year	Film	#	Song	Composer(s)	Lyricist(s)	Co-artist(s)
1999	Morom Nodir Gabhoru Ghaat	1	"Tumar Gaonkhoni Dhuniya"	Atul Medhi		Sagarika
1999	Morom Nodir Gabhoru Ghaat	2	"Hat Kope Bhori Kope"	Atul Medhi		Zubeen Garg, Mahalakshmi Iyer, Sagarika

=== Non-film songs ===
Year	Album(s)	#	Song	Composer(s)	Lyricist(s)	Co-artist(s)
1999	Madhuri '99	1	"Nasoni Oi Bohagi"	Jiten Saikia		Bandana Sharma
1999	Madhuri '99	2	"O Dehi Oi"	Jiten Saikia		Bandana Sharma
2001	Tumi Mur Priya	3	"Logori Tumi Mur Hobane"	Abhijit Barman		Solo
2001	Tumi Mur Priya	4	"O Mur Majoni Deha"	Abhijit Barman		Solo
2002	Sandhiya Parat	5	"Sandhiya Parat" (Title Track)	Bishnu Jyoti Baruah	Nirupa Roy Baruah	Solo
2003	Bojalije Pepati	6	"Kuliti Oi Bihuti"			Shashwati Phukan
2003	Aanchal	7	"Tumi Jodi Juri"	Jatin Sharma		Solo
2003	Gokul	8				Solo
