= Paapa Pandu =

- Genre: Sitcom
- Directed by: Sihi Kahi Chandru
- Starring: Chidanand; Shalini
- Country of origin: India
- Original language: Kannada

Production
- Producer: Sihi Kahi Chandru
- Running time: Approx. 20 minutes
- Production company: Final Cut Productions

Original release
- Network: ETV Kannada
- Release: 2000
- Network: Colors Kannada
- Release: 2018

Paapa Pandu is an Indian Kannada-language sitcom directed and produced by Sihi Kahi Chandru starring Chidanand in the titular role and Shalini.

== Plot ==
=== Season 1 ===
The series follows the banters between Pachu and Pandu, a young couple with a son.

=== Season 2 ===
Pachu and Pandu's son is now married. Pacho controls both Pandu and her son Punda, whom her daughter-in-law also wants to have control of.

== Cast ==
- Chidanand as Papanashahalli Parandhamayya Panduranga alias Pa. Pa. Pandu or simply Pandu
- Shalini as Pachu Srimathi

=== Season 1 ===
- Jahangir as Pandu (after Chidanand's exit)
- Vikram Soori as Gopi, Srimathi's brother
- Sihi Kahi Chandru as Srimathi's father
- Sihi Kahi Geetha as Bhuvaneswari (Srimathi's mother)
- Gayathri Prabhakar as Ammamma (Srimathi's grandmother)
- Kishan as young Punda
- Namitha Rao as Nurse Maid Lalitha who marries Gopi (Guest appearance)
- Duniya Vijay as a thief
- Ganesh as Doubteshi
- Srinivas Prabhu as H. Anumaan Rao (Doubteshi's father)
- Vidyamurthy as Samshaya (Doubteshi's mother)
- Padmaja Rao as Vice President Vimala
- B. Jaya as neighbour Shastry's wife
- Muni Janapada as Mohana, Pandu's friend
- Shankar Rao as Boss Balraj
- Roopa Prabhakar as Kleesha
- Ramesh Pandit as Gaabri Gopalayya
- Srinath Vasishta as Sudugadu
- Venkatachalapathy MSIL as Peon Singayya
- Mithra as Janesha

=== Season 2 ===
- Shruthi Ramesh as Nimmi
- Saurabh Kulkarni as the older Pundarika alias "Punda"
- Sihi Kahi Chandru as Nimbehuli Baba
- Anjan
- Nandana
- Shruti

== Production ==
The series was first aired in 2000, and it was renewed for a second season on 2 July 2018. As of 2018, the series had completed 75 episodes. As of 2019, the series had completed 300 episodes. Due to low TRP ratings, the series was brought to a end in 2020.
