= Celebrity Cricket League =

Indian amateur men's cricket league

- Countries: India
- Headquarters: Hyderabad, Telangana, India
- Format: T20(Current) T10
- First edition: 2011
- Latest edition: 2026
- Next edition: 2027
- Tournament format: Round-robin and Knockout
- Number of teams: 8
- Current champion: Karnataka Bulldozers (3rd Title)
- Most successful: Telugu Warriors (4 Titles)
- TV: JioHotstar
- Website: www.ccl.in
- 2026 Celebrity Cricket League

The Celebrity Cricket League (CCL) is an exhibition men's cricket league in India. It consists of eight teams of film actors from different film industries of Indian cinema. The league commenced in 2011. Salman Khan is the brand ambassador for Celebrity Cricket League from 2011 for all seasons. The CCL teams use various venues for their home games and it has a vast coverage in Indian media.

== Establishment ==
The popularity of the Indian Premier League inspired the CCL, with franchises in major Indian cities. Vishnu Vardhan Induri, an entrepreneur from Hyderabad, is the founder and managing director of CCL. He started the league in 2010 by selling franchise rights for four teams in the inaugural season. For the second season, two additional teams were added.

In January 2024, With South Indian International Media Awards (SIIMA) completing 12 years and Celebrity Cricket League (CCL) gearing up for its 10th season, the founder of SIIMA and CCL Vishnu Vardhan Induri joins forces with Alankar Pandian of Invenio Origin, a media investment fund based out of Singapore and Dubai to launch a New Pan India Media IP called Indian National Cine Academy (INCA) along with scaling up SIIMA and CCL.

== History ==
Winners of the Celebrity Cricket League
Season	Winners
2011	Chennai Rhinos
2012	Chennai Rhinos (2)
2013	Karnataka Bulldozers
2014	Karnataka Bulldozers (2)
2015	Telugu Warriors
2016	Telugu Warriors (2)
2017	Telugu Warriors (3)
2019	Mumbai Heroes
2023	Telugu Warriors (4)
2024	Bengal Tigers
2025	Punjab De Sher
2026	Karnataka Bulldozers (3)

=== First season ===
The inaugural season of CCLCricket took place in 2011 and included participation from ariyumo four teams – Chennai Rhinos, Telugu Warriors, Mumbai Heroes, and Karnataka Bulldozers. With CCL season 1, the organizers planned to create awareness about anti-piracy. Chennai Rhinos defeated Karnataka Bulldozers in a competitive final and emerged as the inaugural CCL champions.

=== Second season ===
The second season was conducted from 13 January to 13 February 2012. Two new cricket teams, the Kerala Strikers and the Bengal Tigers were added to the CCL. Hindi film industry Team "Mumbai Heroes" selected Sharjah as its home ground. Chennai Rhinos defeated Karnataka Bulldozers for the second time in a row and emerged as the CCL 2 champions.

=== Third season ===
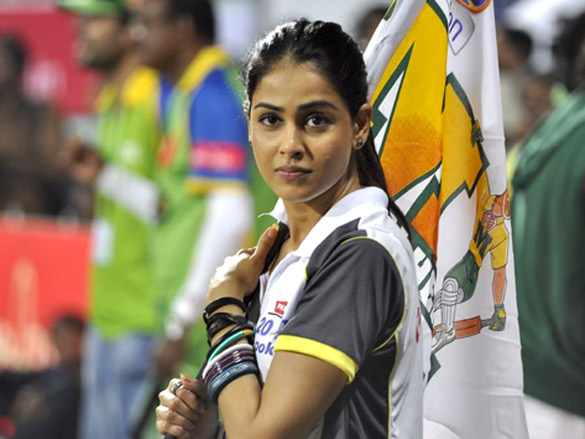
Genelia D'Souza supporting Mumbai Heroes

The third season had two new teams, Veer Marathi representing the Marathi film industry and Bhojpuri Dabbangs representing the Bhojpuri film industry. In Season 3, the curtain raiser event was held in Mumbai on 19 January 2013 and was regarded by many as a grand affair, where Salman Khan, Katrina Kaif, Bipasha Basu, Prabhu Deva and many other celebrities performed. The opening ceremony was in Kochi on 9 February 2013, where Kerala Strikers played against Mumbai Heroes. Bollywood actor Bipasha Basu was appointed as the brand ambassador for Celebrity Cricket League (CCL) season 3, along with Kajal Aggarwal. Karnataka Bulldozers defeated Telugu Warriors to become CCL 3 champions.

=== Fourth season ===
CCL Season 4 had a bigger reach than the earlier seasons as Colors TV had come in as a broadcast partner for the Mumbai Heroes games and Rishtey TV telecasted all the games. Karnataka Bulldozers qualified for the finals for the fourth consecutive year. They won the cup by defeating Kerala Strikers.

=== Fifth season ===
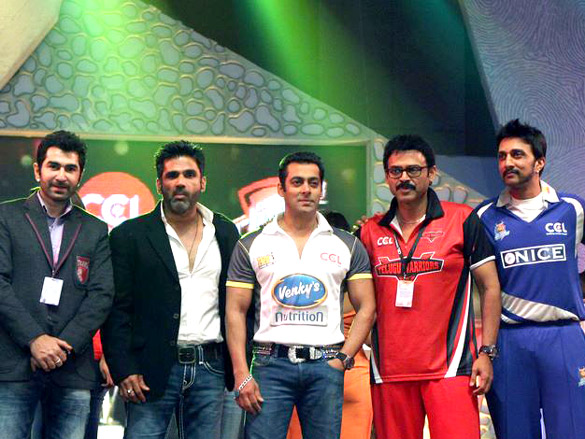
Brand Ambassador for Celebrity Cricket League From 2011 Salman Khan (center) with Jeet and Suniel Shetty (left) Venkatesh and Sudeepa (right) at a CCL match in 2012

CCL season 5 was the most successful season in terms of revenues and television viewership. As per TAM, CCL was the second most viewed sporting league in the country due to its reach delivered through Colors in Hindi-speaking markets and Sun Network Channels in South India. Telugu Warriors won the trophy for the first time by defeating 2-time champion Chennai Rhinos.

=== Sixth season ===
A new team, Punjab De Sher, representing the Punjab film industry, was introduced in place of Veer Marathi. Daler Mehndi was the brand ambassador of the team, with Sonu Sood the captain. Mr. Puneet and Navraj Hans were the owners of the team. Punjab De Sher selected new players for the team. Telugu Warriors won the cup for the second time.

=== Tenth season ===
In CCL Season 10, the first schedule took place at the UAE's Sharjah Stadium, with an introduction ceremony held near the Burj Khalifa. Five teams displayed extraordinary all-round performances, winning three out of four matches each. However, Telugu Warriors lagged behind due to their net run rate, while Karnataka, Mumbai, Bengal, and Chennai advanced to the semifinals. In the finals, Karnataka and Bengal faced off, with Bengal emerging as the new champions of the season.

=== Eleventh season ===
Only seven teams participated as Kerala did not take part. Defending champions Bengal continued their dominant form, winning all four of their league matches. Bengaluru maintained their usual standard with three wins, while Punjab reached the semifinals for the first time. Chennai, initially planning to withdraw due to financial reasons, stayed in the tournament following Sudeep's request and made it to the finals. In the final match, Punjab defeated Chennai, securing the championship after 11 years.

=== Twelfth season ===
Bengal and Karnataka continued their strong form from the previous season, once again reaching the semifinals. Kerala and Chennai delivered consistent performances to secure playoffs berths. The defending champions, Punjab, failed to qualify for the playoffs. Karnataka went on to win the title, defeating Bengal in the final to bag their third championship and end a 12-year title drought.

== Teams and performance ==
=== Current teams ===
Band	Team	Industry	State	Captain	Debut	Ownership
	Telugu Warriors	Telugu/Tollywood	Andhra Pradesh, Telangana	Akkineni Akhil	2011	Venkatesh Daggubati, Sachin Joshi
	Mumbai Heroes	Hindi/Bollywood	Maharashtra	Riteish Deshmukh	2011	Sohail Khan
	Bengal Tigers	Bengali/Tollywood	West Bengal	Jisshu Sengupta	2012	Boney Kapoor, Raj Shah
	Bhojpuri Dabbangs	Bhojpuri/Bhojiwood	Uttar Pradesh, Bihar, Jharkhand	Manoj Tiwari	2013	Sushil Sharma · Kanishk Sheel · Rahul Mishra · Sushil Malik
	Chennai Kings	Tamil/Kollywood	Tamil Nadu	Vikranth	2026	Ishari K. Ganesh, Sripriya Rajkumar
	Karnataka Bulldozers	Kannada/Sandalwood	Karnataka	Sudeep	2011	Ashok Kheny
	Kerala Strikers	Malayalam/Mollywood	Kerala	Unni Mukundan	2012	Mohanlal, Rajkumar, Sripriya, Shaji, Jaison, Mibu Jose Nettikaden
	Punjab De Sher	Punjabi/Pollywood	Punjab	Harrdy Sandhu	2016	Navraj Hans, Puneet Singh

=== Defunct team ===
Band	Team	Industry	State	Captain	Debut	Ownership
	Veer Marathi	Marathi	Maharashtra	Mahesh Manjrekar	2013	Riteish Deshmukh
	Chennai Rhinos	Tamil/Kollywood	Tamil Nadu	Arya	2011	K. Ganga Prasad

=== Total performance ===
Sns. Tms.	2011 (4)	2012 (6)	2013 (8)	2014 (8)	2015 (8)	2016 (8)	2017 (6)	2019 (6)	2023 (8)	2024 (8)	2025 (7)	2026 (8)
Chennai Kings (~~Chennai Rhinos~~)	W	W	GS	GS	R	GS	GS		GS	SF	R	SF
Karnataka Bulldozers	R	R	W	W	SF	R	GS	R	SF	R	SF	W
Mumbai Heroes	GS	SF	GS	SF	SF	GS	GS	W	SF	SF	GS	GS
Telugu Warriors	GS	SF	R	GS	W	W	W	GS	W	GS	GS	GS
Bengal Tigers		GS	GS	GS	GS	SF	GS	SF	GS	W	SF	R
Kerala Strikers		GS	SF	R	GS	GS	R		GS	GS		SF
Bhojpuri Dabbangs			GS	SF	GS	SF		SF	R	GS	GS	GS
~~Veer Marathi~~			SF	GS	GS							
Punjab De Sher						GS		GS	GS	GS	W	GS

Notes:

- W = Winner; R = Runner-up; SF = SemiFinalist; GS = GroupStage
- 2018 CCL T10 was cancelled
- 2019 CCL T10 Semi-final and final matches were not conducted due to rain. Based on group stage performance Mumbai Heroes (win all 3 matches) and Karnataka Bulldozers (win 2 out of 3 matches) teams announced as Winner and Runner up respectively.
- Stats till 25th Jan 2026

	Appearances	Playoffs	Titles	Matches	Won	Lost	NR
Bengal Tigers	11	5	1	46	18	25	3
Bhojpuri Dabbangs	9	4	0	36	15	18	3
Karnataka Bulldozers	12	11	3	58	39	16	3
Kerala Strikers	9	4	0	36	17	18	1
Mumbai Heroes	12	6	1	48	18	27	3
Punjab De Sher	6	1	1	22	6	15	1
Telugu Warriors	12	6	4	51	33	17	1
Chennai Kings (~~Chennai Rhinos~~)	11	6	2	47	20	24	3
~~Veer Marathi~~	3	1	0	11	3	8	0

=== Best performance ===
Team	Appearances			Best result
Team	Total	First	Latest	Best result
Telugu Warriors	12	2011	2026	Champions (2015, 2016, 2017, 2023)
Karnataka Bulldozers	12	2011	2026	Champions (2013, 2014, 2026)
Chennai Kings (~~Chennai Rhinos~~)	11	2011	2026	Champions (2011, 2012)
Mumbai Heroes	12	2011	2026	Champions (2019)
Bengal Tigers	11	2012	2026	Champions (2024)
Punjab De Sher	6	2016	2026	Champions (2025)
Kerala Strikers	9	2012	2026	Runners-up (2014, 2017)
Bhojpuri Dabbangs	9	2013	2026	Runners-up (2023)
~~Veer Marathi~~	3	2013	2015	Semi-finals (2013)

=== Squads ===
Mumbai Heroes	Bengal Tigers	Karnataka Bulldozers	Chennai Rhinos	Telugu Warriors	Kerala Strikers	Bhojpuri Dabang	Punjab De Sher	Veer Marathi (Defunct team)
Riteish Deshmukh (captain); Sohail Khan; Salman Khan; Bobby Deol; Sunil Shetty; Varun Badola; Aftab Shivdasani; Sameer Kochhar; Indraneil Sengupta; Apoorva Lakhia; Kabir Sadanand; Kunal Khemu; Raja Bherwani; Shabbir Ahluwalia; Sharad Kelkar; Saqib Saleem; Tushar Jalota; Vatsal Seth; Sahil Chaudhary; Mudasir Zafar; Former players: Sonu Sood	Jisshu (captain); Joy; Rahul; Indrasish; Bonny; Sourav (Wk); Jammy; Yousuf; Ratnadeep; Ananda; Aditya; Uday; Anshuman; Joey; Trambak; Anirrban; Sougata; Satadeep; Head Coach: Saradindu Mukherjee; Former players: Prosenjit Chatterjee (Former Mentor); Jeet (Former captain); Dev; Amitabh Bhattacharjee; Rahul Banerjee; Gourav Chakraborty; Indraneil Sengupta; Jeetu; Sumon; Sandy; Manty; Vinayak; Raja; Mohan; Indrajit; Debraj; Mukul; Debu; Sidd; Abhi; Tabun; Rubin; Heerok; Koushik; Arman	Sudeep (captain); Pradeep; Shiva Rajkumar; Yash; Ganesh; Krishna; Tarun Chandra; Jai Karthik; Bhuvan Chandra; Sunil Raoh; Chandan Kumar; Nirup Bhandari; Tarun Sudhir; Nanda Kishore; Prathap Narayanan; Trivikram; Arjun Yogesh Raj; Prasanna; Abhimanyu; Bhaskar; Rahul; Rajeev Hanu; Karan Aryan; Arun Bachchan; Dharma; Saurav; Viswas; Darshan; Former players: Dhruv Sarja; Chiranjeevi Sarja; Dhruv Sharma	Vikranth (captain); Shanthanu; Prithvi Rajan; Kalaiyarasan; Bharath; Ramana; Aadhav; Dasarathan; Sharran; Ajay Rohan; Pari; Sathya NJ; R. K. Suresh; Saravana Vel; Rishikanth; Sivaraman; Former players: Arya; Vishnu Vishal; Abbas; Jiiva; Hamsavardhan; Shiva; Jayam Ravi; Jithan Ramesh; Karthik Kumar; Madhavan; Ashok Selvan; Nithin Sathya; Prem; Rishikanth; Sarathkumar; Sri Balaji; Srikanth; Sundar Ramu; Suriya; Vishal; Shaam; Bose Venkat; Mahendran; Hemachandran; Nandha; Bala Saravanan; Sanjay Bharathi; Uday Kumar	Akhil Akkineni (captain); Aadi Saikumar; Ashwin Babu; Aadarsh Balakrishna; Nikhil Siddhartha; Prince Cecil; Roshan Meka; Sachin Joshi; Sudheer Babu; Thaman S; Sushanth; Khayyum; Nandakishore; Raghu; Samrat Reddy; Harish; Samba; Former players: Venkatesh; Tarun; Srikanth; Ajay; Nithiin; Konidela Ram Charan; Rajeev Kanakala; Siddharth; Sai Dharam Tej; Taraka Ratna; Ayyappa Sharma; Prabhu; Viswa	Unni Mukundan (Captain); Bineesh Kodiyeri; Madan Mohan; Vivek Gopan; Jean Paul Lal; Prasanth Alexander; Manikuttan; Akhil Marar; Aryan Kathuria; Arun Benny; Arjun Nandhakumar; Mohammed Shariq; Prajod Kalabhavan; Shafique Rehman; Samarth Ambujakshan; John Kaippallil; Sanju Sivram; Anoop Krishnan; Former players: Mohanlal; Nivin Pauly; Asif Ali; Rajeev Pillai; Bala; Riyaz Khan; Antony Varghese; Saiju Kurup; Indrajith Sukumaran; Siddharth Menon; Sumesh; Rakendhu; Kunchacko Boban; Munna Simon; Rejith Menon	Manoj Tiwari (Captain); Dinesh Lal Yadav (Vice Captain); Ravi Kishan; Pravesh Lal Yadav; Uday Tiwari; Rahul Singh; Ajhoy Sharma; Prakash Jais; Ayaz Khan; Sushil Singh; Abhay Sinha; Khesari Lal Yadav; Jay Yadav; Ravi Yadav; Surya Dwivedi; Vikash Singh; Pawan Singh; Santosh Singh; Ajay Srivastav; Vikrant Singh Rajpoot; Anil Samrat	Sonu Sood (Captain); Mika Singh; Jimmy Shergill; Ayushmann Khurana; Binnu Dhillon; Manvir Sran; Rahul Dev; Navraj Hans; Karan Wahi; Harmeet Singh; Piyush Malhotra; Gulzar Chahal; Roshan Prince; Amrinder Gill; Angad Bedi; Yuvraj Hans; Raju Sharma; Dilraj Khurana; Arjun Madan	Mahesh Manjrekar (Captain); Makrand Deshpande; Siddarth Jadhav; Sanjay Narvekar; Upendra Limaye; Pushkar Jog; Rajesh Shringarpure; Ankush Chaudhari; Maadhav Deochake; Siddharth Chandekar; Aniket Vishwasrao; Sameer Dharmadhikari; Manoje Biddvai; Ajit Parab; Nupur Dhudwadkar; Rahul Gore; Siddhant Mooley; Rahul Sugandh; Raiees Lashkaria; Vijay Kenkre

== Venues ==
- Ahmedabad: Sardar Patel Stadium
- Bengaluru: M. Chinnaswamy Stadium
- Chennai: M. A. Chidambaram Stadium
- Coimbatore: SNR College Cricket Ground
- Madurai: Velammal Cricket Ground
- Kochi: Jawaharlal Nehru Stadium
- Hyderabad: Rajiv Gandhi International Cricket Stadium
- Hyderabad: Lal Bahadur Shastri Stadium
- Mumbai: Brabourne Stadium
- Mumbai: DY Patil Stadium
- Jodhpur: Barkatullah Khan Stadium
- Jaipur: Sawai Mansingh Stadium
- Mysore: Srikantadatta Narasimha Raja Wadiyar Ground
- Pune: Maharashtra Cricket Association Cricket Stadium
- Dubai: Dubai International Cricket Stadium
- Sharjah: Sharjah Cricket Association Stadium
- Siliguri: Kanchenjunga Stadium
- Trivandrum: Greenfield International Stadium
- Visakhapatnam: Dr. Y. S. Rajasekhara Reddy International Cricket Stadium
- Cuttack: Barabati Stadium
- Ranchi: JSCA International Stadium Complex
- Chandigarh: Sector 16 Stadium
- Raipur: Shaheed Veer Narayan Singh International Cricket Stadium
- Mohali: Inderjit Singh Bindra Stadium
- Delhi: Feroz Shah Kotla Stadium
- Surat: Lalbhai Contractor Stadium
