= Bangalore 560023 =

- Poster
- Directed by: MPradeep Raj
- Screenplay by: MPradeep Raj
- Dialogues by: Shailesh Raj; MPradeep Raj
- Based on: Chennai 600028 by Venkat Prabhu
- Produced by: Puneeth B. P. Manu
- Starring: Karthik Jayaram; Chandan Kumar; Dhruv Sharma; Chikkanna; Rajeev
- Cinematography: K. S. Dharani
- Edited by: Vinod Manohar
- Music by: Arun Andrews
- Production companies: Indirajal Advertisement Solutions; Chirag Cinemas; Veerabhadreshwara Cinemas
- Release date: 20 November 2015
- Running time: 141 minutes
- Country: India
- Language: Kannada

Bangalore 560023 is a 2015 Indian Kannada-language sports comedy film directed by MPradeep Raj. The film stars Karthik Jayaram, Chandan Kumar, Dhruv Sharma, Chikkanna, Rajeev and Naveen Naidu, along with Sanjjana and Shivani, making her acting debut. It is a remake of the Tamil film Chennai 600028 (2007).

The film was produced by Puneeth B. P. and Manu and the film's score and soundtrack were composed by Arun Andrews. The film is based on street cricket played in India, focussing on themes such as friendship, love and rivalry in a suburban area. The film's title is derived from the pincode for Binnypet, a neighborhood of Central Bengaluru, where the story takes place.

== Cast ==
- Karthik Jayaram as Karthik
- Chandan Kumar as Chandan
- Dhruv Sharma as Dhruva
- Rajeev Hanu as Rajeev
- Chikkanna as Mahalinga
- Vishruth Raj
- Naveen Naidu (Taj)
- Garuda Ram
- Manu
- Heavy Kumar
- Naveen
- Alfred (Rahul)
- Raghu Srivathsa
- P Vadiraj
- Sanjjana as Swathi
- Shivani
- Shobaraj
- Tennis Krishna as Barber
- Rohith Shetty
- Mimicry Gopi
- Churi Ranga
- King Mohan
- Murthy Gowda
- Jagadish Gowda
- Niharika
- Shashikala

== Production ==
The film stars several members of the Karnataka Bulldozers of the Celebrity Cricket League. While working Chandan Kumar on the film, he attempted to join the team due to his cricket background.

== Soundtrack ==
Arun Andrews scored the background music and the soundtrack for the film. The soundtrack album consists of nine tracks which follow the same tunes of the Tamil original film composed by Yuvan Shankar Raja. It was released on 22 November 2014 in Bangalore.

All lyrics are written by Shailesh Raj.

Track listing
No.	Title	Singer(s)	Length
1.	"Naaleya Nambu Maga"	Tippu, Santhosh, Aravind	3:57
2.	"Nannavale"	Sonu Nigam	3:43
3.	"O Premi"	Chandan Shetty	3:51
4.	"Yaaro"	Vijay Prakash, Supriya Lohith	4:12
5.	"Saithu Aunty"	Shamita Malnad	3:49
6.	"Madhuvana"	Suchitra, Aravind	4:02
7.	"Sukkillada"	Vijay Prakash	2:45
8.	"Yaariva"	Aravind	1:12
9.	"Geleya"	Santhosh	4:37
Total length:			32:08

== Reception ==
Sunayana Suresh of The Times of India rated the film three out of five stars and wrote, "it makes for a good one-time watch as it has relatively good performers and a story that will strike a chord with most people. There are a few shortcomings, when it comes to some of the casting choices".
