= Shankar Rao (actor) =

Indian film and television actress (died 2021)

- Born: Tumakuru, Karnataka, India
- Died: 18 October 2021 (aged 84); Bengaluru, Karnataka, India
- Occupations: Film and television actor
- Years active: 1972–2021

Shankar Rao (1936/7 – 18 October 2021) was an Indian film and television actor who was known for his comic roles.

== Life and career ==
Shankar began his acting career in theatre in Bengaluru. He founded his own theatre group known as Kalakshetra. He made his film debut with the movie ‘Yaara Sakshi’ (1972).

== Selected filmography ==
=== Films ===
- Yaara Sakshi (1972)
- Muyyige Muyyi (1978)
- Moogana Sedu (1980)
- Prachanda Kulla (1984)...Ganganna
- Thulasidala (1985)...Dixit
- Jeevana Chakra (1985)
- Elu Suttina Kote (1987)
- Aasphota (1988)
- Shruthi (1990)
- Mysore Mallige (1992)
- Ulta Palta (1997)...Shettru
- Milana (2007)
- Drona (2020)...Shankar

=== Television ===
- Mayamruga (1998)
- Papa Pandu (2000–2005) - Boss Balaraj
- Silli Lalli (2003–2007)
