= Bindas Hudugi =

- Directed by: Priya Hassan
- Written by: B A Madhu (dialogue)
- Screenplay by: Priya Hassan
- Story by: Priya Hassan
- Produced by: Gowramma; Mohan Gowda
- Starring: Priya Hassan
- Cinematography: R Giri
- Edited by: Sanjeeva Reddy; Srinivas Babu
- Music by: Yerra Ramesh
- Release date: 5 November 2010
- Country: India
- Language: Kannada

Bindas Hudugi (transl. Cool girl) is a 2010 Indian Kannada-language action drama film directed, produced, written and acted by Priya Hassan. The film ran for a hundred days.

== Cast ==
- Priya Hassan as Devi
- Ravishankar Gowda
- Ninasam Aswath
- Baby Anusha
- Jayanthi
- Girija Lokesh
- Suresh Mangalore as the chief minister
- Ganesh Rao
- Mohan Juneja as Govinda
- Sharan
- Shankar Ashwath
- Kamala
- Mithra
- Rohith Nagesh
- Ramamurthy
- Sudhindra

== Production ==
This is Priya Hassan's second film as a director, producer, writer and actor after Jambada Hudugi (2007). The film was produced by her mother Gowramma and her brother Mohan Gowda.

== Soundtrack ==
The songs were composed by Yerra Ramesh. Three songs were shot in Thailand: one each in Bangkok, Pattaya, and Phuket. The rest of the songs were shot on sets in Bangalore.

Track listing
No.	Title	Lyrics	Singer(s)	Length
1.	"Naa Ninna Nodida"	Ram Narayan	Mahalakshmi Iyer, Kunal Ganjawala	3:48
2.	"Sona Sona"	Kaviraj	Suvi Suresh	4:09
3.	"Ulta Kano"	V. Nagendra Prasad	Malathi	4:01
4.	"Kannali Kannittu Nodu"	Ram Narayan	Tippu, Shreya Ghoshal	3:37
5.	"Yemma Yemma"	V. Nagendra Prasad	Shamita Malnad, Hemanth Kumar	3:06
Total length:				18:41

== Reception ==
A critic from The Times of India gave the film a rating of three out of five stars and wrote that "Though there is no strong storyline, Priya has mixed entertainment, action and sentiment well with good narration, though it looks silly in many sequences". A critic from Deccan Herald wrote that "Bringing to mind Malashri of yore, Priya bashes up the goons or shakes a leg or two, whenever fancy strikes. This desire to dominate the audience is perhaps the main drawback of the film, distracting the viewers from the plot, already weakened by the absence of a competent writer." V. S. Rajapur of IANS rated the film 2 1/2 out of 5 stars and wrote that "The plot has too many loopholes but the effort is successful as the film entertains".
