= Dhruv Sharma =

Indian cricketer and actor

- Born: 1982
- Died: 1 August 2017 (aged 35)
- Other names: Dhruva Sharma
- Occupations: Actor, cricketer
- Years active: 1994; 2002–2018

Dhruv Sharma (1982 – 1 August 2017) was an Indian Kannada-language actor and cricketer.

== Career ==
=== Acting career ===
Dhruv Sharma played a small role in Yahoo (2004). He made his debut as a lead actor with Snehanjali (2007), which won the Guinness Book of World Record for the first film to have a deaf-mute person in the lead role. The film received mixed reviews but Dhruv's performance was praised. His next film was the Malayalam-Kannada film The Hitlist (2012) in which he played the antagonist. The film had a low-key release and notably featured Mohanlal in a voiceover. The film released to negative reviews with a critic opining that his performance was one of the saving graces.

In 2013, he co-starred Soumya Bollapragada and Venkatesh Prasad in the romantic comedy Neenandre Ishta Kano. A critic felt that Dhruv was good but that Venkatesh Prasad outshone him. He played a minor role opposite Neha Patil and co-starring his father in Thippaji Circle (2015), a film based on the life of a devadasi. He played one of the leads in the cricket film Bangalore 560023 (2015) co-starring Karthik Jayaram, Chandan Kumar, Rajeev and Chikkanna. In 2018, he starred posthumously in Kicchu (2018), which was based on the issue of deforestation and featured Sudeep in a cameo. The film was notable for also featuring Abhinaya, another deaf-mute actor. The film released to mixed reviews with a critic writing that the film "might not be a drama that keeps you in the edge of your seat, but it has its heart set in the right place". His final film Looty (2018), which featured him opposite Shweta Pandit, released to highly negative reviews.

=== Cricket career ===
In 2005, he played for India at the Deaf Cricket World Cup. In 2011, he joined the Karnataka Bulldozers of the Celebrity Cricket League after being noticed by Salman Khan. In 2013, he was the vice captain of the team, which was headed by Sudeep. He was named the Man of the Tournament in a 2016 game that his team won against the Telugu Warriors.

== Personal life ==
Dhruv Sharma was born to businessman and actor Suresh Sharma. He is deaf-mute in Bangalore and found it difficult to follow college lectures after taking some computer science classes. Dhruv died on 1 August 2017.

== Filmography ==
Year	Film	Role	Notes
1994	Prema Simhasana		Child artist
2002	Joot		
2004	Yahoo	Sneha's lover	
2007	Snehanjali	Prem	
2012	The Hitlist	Dhruv	Malayalam-Kannada film
2013	Neenandre Ishta Kano	Sanjay	
2015	Thippaji Circle		
2015	Bangalore 560023	Dhruva	
2018	Kicchu	Suri	Posthumous film
2018	Looty	Jaggi	Posthumous film
