= Priya Hassan =

Indian actress, director and producer

- Born: Karnataka, India
- Education: National High School, Basavanagudi
- Occupations: Actress, Director, Producer, Singer
- Years active: 2007–present

Priya Hassan is an Indian actress, director, producer, and singer who predominantly works in the Kannada film industry.

== Career ==
Hassan made her acting debut with Black & White (2003). Her first film that she directed and produced was Jambada Hudugi, which had a low-key release. Her dual roles as a director and actor were appreciated by one critic who concluded that "Kannada fans should see and encourage a budding talent like Priya Hasan". The film reportedly run for a hundred days and later gained media attention for being the debut of Yash. Hassan expected that the film would get a state award, but the film was denied of awards since she did not dub her own voice in the film. She then directed, produced and starred in Bindaas Hudugi. Regarding her performance, critic wrote that "Priya Hassan, who is brilliant in action and comic sequences, needs to improve her dialogue delivery". Her next film as an actor was Smuggler (2017). The film began production in 2012. She played dual roles in the film. Regarding her performance, a critic noted that "Priya has tried hard to fit into the two characters that are contrasting, and her effort shows".

== Personal life ==
Hassan married businessman S. Ramu on September 8, 2016.

== Filmography ==
=== Director, producer, and actor ===
Year	Title	Credited as			Role	Notes
Year	Title	Director	Producer	Actor	Role	Notes
2003	Black & White	No	No	Yes		
2007	Jambada Hudugi	Yes	Yes	Yes	Priya	Kannada Film Industry Directors' Association - Best Debut Director
2010	Bindaas Hudugi	Yes	Yes	Yes	Devi	
2017	Smuggler	No	Yes	Yes	Cyrus / Kathyayini	
