= Thippaji Circle =

2015 film

- Theatrical release poster
- Directed by: Adithya Chikkanna
- Written by: Adithya Chikkanna
- Produced by: R.G. Siddaramaiah
- Starring: Pooja Gandhi
- Music by: Bharani Sri
- Production company: Ruby Cinekraft
- Release date: 30 October 2015 (India)
- Running time: 87 minutes
- Country: India
- Language: Kannada

Thippaji Circle is a 2015 Indian Kannada-language drama film written and directed by Aditya Chikkanna. The film stars Pooja Gandhi and Suresh Sharma. The supporting cast features Bhavya, Neha Patil and Dhruv Sharma.

The movie narrates the life of a devadasi, Thippava (Pooja Gandhi), and is based on a novel by B. L. Venu. Venu also wrote the film's dialogues, for which he earned an award at the 2014 Karnataka State Film Awards. The film received an A certificate from the Central Board of Film Certification since the item number it featured was deemed provocative.

== Cast ==
- Pooja Gandhi
- Suresh Sharma
- Dhruv Sharma
- Neha Patil
- Bhavya
- Anitha Bhat

== Soundtrack ==
Thippaji Circle

Soundtrack album by Baranishree
- Released: 31 August 2014
- Recorded: 2014
- Genre: Soundtrack
- Length: 25:01
- Label: Lahari Music
- Producer: Baranishree

The music was composed by Baranishree and released by Lahari Music.

Track list
No.	Title	Lyrics	Singer(s)	Length
1.	"Bantho Bantho"	Baranishree	Madhu Balakrishnan	5:15
2.	"Youvana Hoo Bana"	Mohd Ghouse Peer	S. P. Balasubrahmanyam, Anuradha Bhat	5:03
3.	"Dumbee Dumbee"	Goturi	Hemanth, Shamitha Malnad	4:55
4.	"Higguveyako"	Goturi	Anuradha Bhat	3:45
5.	"Ye Bhagavantha"	Purandara Dasa	Vijay Prakash	3:40
6.	"Ninnantha Hennige"	Baranishree	Baranishree	2:23
Total length:				25:01

== Release ==
The film was released theatrically on 30 October 2015.

== Reception ==
Sunayana Suresh of The Times of India rated the film three out of five stars and wrote that "The film right from the beginning shows that it isn't the regular commercial drama, but the narrative does keep one hooked, provided one has the taste for films that aren't regular masala potboilers. One must hand it to dubbing artiste Shashikala, for her voice helps elevate Pooja's performance to another level." A critic from Deccan Herald panned the film for lacking depth and finesse, citing director Aditya Chikkanna's commercial approach. The inclusion of Ukrainian dancer Anna's item number was particularly criticized as frivolous. A critic from Vijaya Karnataka rated the film three out of five stars, praising the lead cast's performances but suggesting that the last two songs could have been cut.
