= The Hitlist =

2012 Indian film

- Theatrical release poster
- Directed by: Bala
- Screenplay by: Bala
- Dialogue by: U. Harish; Subhod Cherthala
- Produced by: Bala
- Starring: Bala; Dhruv Sharma; Aishwarya Devan
- Narrated by: Mohanlal (Malayalam); Sudeepa (Kannada)
- Cinematography: Madhu Neelakandan
- Edited by: Samjith Mohammed
- Music by: Alphons Joseph
- Production company: Arunachalam Pictures
- Distributed by: Celebs & Red Carpet
- Release date: 7 December 2012
- Running time: 134 minutes
- Country: India
- Languages: Malayalam; Kannada

The Hitlist is a 2012 Indian action thriller film written, directed and produced by Bala (in his directorial debut). It was simultaneously shot in Malayalam and Kannada languages. The film stars Bala, Dhruv Sharma (in his Malayalam debut), and Aishwarya Devan, while Samudrakani, Thalaivasal Vijay, Riyaz Khan, Tini Tom, and Sasi Kalinga plays supporting roles. The film's music was composed by Alphons Joseph. The plot follows ACP Vikram Rathod, who is assigned to catch a serial killer who has been murdering police officers.

The film completed production in late-June 2012. The Hitlist was released in theatres on 7 December 2012.

== Cast ==
- Bala as ACP Vikram Rathore IPS
- Dhruv Sharma as Dhruv
- Aishwarya Devan as Avanthika
- Riyaz Khan as CI Simon
- Krishna as Anand
- Thalaivasal Vijay as IG Robert IPS
- Sreejith Ravi as Peter
- Sasi Kalinga as Madhavan
- Tini Tom as Stephen
- Riza Bava as DGP
- Suresh Krishna as Commissioner
- Kiran Raj as SP
- Samudrakani as DSP Anapazhakan
- Sandhya as Gouri
- Sukanya as Herself
- Unni Mukundan as SI Ajai Kumar (Cameo appearance)
- Narain as Dr. Lewis (Cameo appearance)

== Production ==
The Hitlist marks the directorial debut of actor Bala. Screenplay was also written by him. He also played the lead role, while Kannada actor Dhruv Sharma and Aishwarya Devan portrayed other two principal characters. Filming began in Kochi. Initially, Prithviraj Sukumaran and Unni Mukundan were supposed to make cameo appearances. In the film, Mukundan and Narain appeared in cameo roles. Bala also produced the film. The film was simultaneously shot in Malayalam and Kannada languages. Mohanlal and Sudeepa did voice-over in Malayalam and Kannada versions, respectively.

== Soundtrack ==
The soundtrack features three songs composed by Alphons Joseph . The lyrics were written by Santhosh Varma & Jophy Tharakan.

Track listing

No.	Title	Lyrics	Singer(s)	Length
1.	"Kadhakalumezhuthi"	Santhosh Varma	Alphons Joseph, San Jaimt	2:53
2.	"Kannake"	Santhosh Varma, Jophy Tharakan	Alphons Joseph, Amrutha Suresh	4:52
3.	"Manathe Vellikinnathil"	Jophy tharakan	Sayanora Philip	4:48
4.	"Akalaminnarikilalle"	Santhosh Varma	Amritha Suresh	4:31
Total length:				15:84

== Release ==
The Malayalam version The Hitlist was released in theatres on 7 December 2012. The Kannada version remains unreleased.
