= Sihi Kahi Chandru =

Kannada Theatre artist/Film actor

- Born: A. Chandrashekhar; 23 July 1962 (age 64); Bangalore, Mysore State, India
- Occupations: Actor; television host; director; producer
- Years active: 1986–present
- Spouse: Sihi Kahi Geetha (m. 1990)
- Children: 2, including Hitha Chandrashekar

A. Chandrashekar (born 23 July 1962), known professionally as Sihi Kahi Chandru, is an Indian actor, television host, director and producer, and theatre personality who primarily works in Kannada cinema and television. In addition to his acting career, he is known for hosting cookery programmes.

Chandru has appeared in more than 500 films and numerous television serials, and has also worked as a radio presenter. After beginning his career in theatre, Chandru gained popularity for his role in the television soap Sihi Kahi (1986–1987), from which he derived his screen name. He made his film debut with Avale Nanna Hendthi (1988), and after appearing in minor roles during the late 1980s, received his breakthrough with Hrudaya Geethe (1989). He subsequently became known for portraying comedic characters in films such as Ganeshana Maduve (1990), Gauri Ganesha (1991), Bombat Hendthi (1992) and Tenali Rama (2006).

Under his production banner Final Cut Productions, Chandru produced and directed the television serials Papa Pandu (2000–2005) and Silli Lalli (2000–2007), both of which became highly popular and ran for more than 1,000 episodes each, later spawning second seasons in the 2010s. His directorials Parvathi Parameshwara (2009–2013) and Panduranga Vittala (2011–2013) also became popular. Beginning in the late 2000s, Chandru hosted several cookery shows on Kannada television, most notably Bombaat Bhojana, which completed 1,500 episodes in 2025. In 2022, Chandru was awarded the Rajyotsava Award by the Government of Karnataka in recognition of his contributions to Kannada cinema and television.

== Early life ==
Chandru was born in Rajajinagar, Bangalore, on 23 July 1962, the second son of Ashwath Narayan Rao, a spinning manager, and Meenakshi, a homemaker. Chandru attended National English School and Vidya Vardhaka Sangha, where he completed his schooling, and PUC from St. Joseph's University. He then obtained a bachelor of science degree from MES College of Arts, Commerce and Science. He acted in several plays while in college, and also served as its student president. During this time, he met actor and director Shankar Nag, who handed him the book Journey to Ixtlan by Carlos Castaneda. The book on self-reflection had an influence on Chandru. Chandru also obtained a post-graduate diploma in personnel management.

Chandru first acted on stage when he was nine. He recalled, "I liked that everybody used to applaud and praise my performances on stage. I always wanted to be an actor". While in college, he worked as a freelance artist with several Kannada theatre groups, and participated in Kannada and English productions. He also worked as a medical representative during his post-graduation diploma before quitting the job to take up acting.

== Career ==
=== Early days: Theatre, Sihi Kahi and film roles ===
Chandru's association with Shankar Nag and his brother Anant Nag continued as he worked with them on stage and their films. He acted in Shankar Nag's television series, Malgudi Days (1986), while also dubbing for many actors. He then appeared as a lead opposite his future wife Sihi Kahi Geetha on the serial titled Sihi Kahi, which was aired on DD Chandana between 1986 and 1987. It was a sitcom serial in which Chandru and Geetha appeared as a married couple. The serial had a large viewership and was extremely popular with the Kannada audiences. The serial was aired once a week and completed a 52-week run. Chandru and Geetha went on to marry in real life on 9 November 1990. The serial's title subsequently stuck to the couple as prefixes to their names. In an interview with Deccan Herald in 2014, Chandru recalled, "After Sihi Kahi, I did my first film called Dr Vijayanand as a hero, but that never released. I then realised that I was probably not hero material and chose to do comedy as a genre." In the late 1980s, Chandru appeared in a Hindi television series titled Antarala directed by Girish Karnad.

Chandru's first comedic film role came in Avale Nanna Hendthi (1988). During this time, in the mid- to late-1980s, he appeared in bit roles in multiple films, while also continuing to dub in films. In Anjada Gandu (1988), he dubbed for multiple actors. After appearing in minor roles in around 50 films, Chandru received his first major role in H. R. Bhargava's Hrudaya Geethe (1989). Chandru played the antagonist opposite Vishnuvardhan. He went to appear notably in Phani Ramachandra's comedy films such as Ganeshana Maduve (1990), and with Om Sai Prakash, playing prominent comedic supporting roles. In 1998, he was briefly associated with the unreleased film Preethiyallirosukha.

=== 1990s–present: Bombaat Bhojana and other television work ===
In the 1990s, alongside acting in films, Chandru acted in television soaps. He appeared in Mayamruga. In the 2000s, he produced and directed Papa Pandu, a popular sitcom which saw a run of 1,014 episodes. He also wrote and directed Silli Lalli, another sitcom, which was aired from 2003 to 2007. It completed 1,162 episodes. It was reported in 2014 that Chandru produced three television soaps through his production houses, Final Cut Productions and Master Productions. Chandru added that he also made documentary films, ad films and corporate films. In 2016, he exited Final Cut Productions, which he started in 2000 with his friends. He would go on to direct more sitcoms such as Parvathi Parameshwara (2009–2013) and Panduranga Vittala (2011–2013).

Having learnt cooking during his early years in Bengaluru while pursuing an acting career, Chandru incorporated his culinary experiences into his television work. Starting 1990s, Chandru hosted cookery shows such as Nalapaka and Rasapaka. Nalapaka was one of India's first cookery shows, and was aired in 1992 on DD Chandana. However, a dearth of sponsors meant the show had to be taken off air after eight episodes. Chandru then hosted the widely popular show Bombaat Bhojana, which completed more than 750 episodes by 2012. The format of the show involved Chandru visiting selected restaurants to showcase their signature dishes while also presenting his own recipes and cooking techniques. Celebrity guests were also hosted on some episodes. The show was noted for combining cooking demonstrations with slapstick humour and conversational storytelling. The first season of the show ended after completing around 800 episodes. Chandru stated that he took a break from cookery shows after "people associated me only with food. It led to an identity crisis. Nobody talked about my films any more. That's when I decided to stop doing it. The second season began in 2021. In 2023, during its third season, it completed 1,000 episodes. By the end of the fifth season, more than 1,500 episodes were aired. The sixth season premiered in October 2025.

In 2017, Chandru contested in the fifth season of the reality television show Bigg Boss Kannada. In 2018, he produced and directed the second season of Papa Pandu, which completed a run of 300 episodes in 2019. The storyline of the first season was retained and continued. In the same year, he launched and directed the second season of Silli Lalli. However, it was taken off air in 2020 due to low ratings. In 2021, Chandru appeared as judge on Cookku with Kirikku, a cooking reality show, with chef Venkatesh Bhat.

=== Other work ===
Chandru is also a noted theatre personality, known for his comedy play Neenaanaadre naaneenena? (If you are me, then am I you?), an adaptation of William Shakespeare's play The Comedy of Errors, incidentally also adapted in the film a production in Hindi (Angoor). Throughout his career, Chandru acted in numerous plays, both in Kannada, such as Nimitha, Gathi and Sankramana, and in English. He recalled, "Theatre has been my first love and I never leave an opportunity to do the same. I do different roles away for my regular on-screen image."

In 2006, Chandru first hosted a breakfast show on radio for 92.7 Big FM in Bangalore. In 2013, for the same network, his wife Geetha and he hosted a show titled Retro Talkies.

== Partial filmography ==
=== Films ===
- All films are in Kannada, unless otherwise noted.

Year	Title	Role	Notes
1988	Avale Nanna Hendthi	Subhash	
1989	Avane Nanna Ganda	Vinayak	
1989	Hrudaya Geethe	Dr. Sunil	
1989	Narasimha	Chandra	
1989	Jai Karnataka		
1990	Ganeshana Maduve	Chandru	
1990	Golmaal Radhakrishna	Prasad	
1990	Matsara	Chandru	
1990	Muthina Haara	Menasinakai	
1990	Swarna Samsara	Pashupathi	
1990	Shivashankar		
1990	Nigooda Rahasya	Lakkappa	
1990	Challenge Gopalakrishna		
1991	Gauri Ganesha		
1991	Golmal Radhakrishna 2		
1991	Jagadeka Veera		
1991	Rollcall Ramakrishna	Umesh	
1992	Belliyappa Bangarappa		
1992	Bombat Hendthi	Chandru	
2001	Mathadana	Srikanthe Gowda	
2001	Sparsha		
2004	Srusti		
2005	Sakha Sakhi		
2007	Maathaad Maathaadu Mallige	Sheera	
2006	Honeymoon Express		
2006	Julie		
2006	Tenali Rama		
2008	Hani Hani		
2008	Kodagana Koli Nungitha		
2008	Mast Maja Maadi	Samarasimha Reddy	
2008	Milana	Flat manager	
2009	Jhossh	College principal	
2009	Maleyali Jotheyali	Sandhya's father	
2010	Naanu Nanna Kanasu	Hayavadana Achar	
2010	Sri Harikathe		
2010	Ullasa Utsaha	Driver	
2011	9 to 12		
2011	Akasmath		
2011	Aidondla Aidu		
2011	Keratam / Yuvan	College principal	Bi-lingual film (Telugu, Tamil)
2011	Mayadanta Male		
2011	Yogaraj But	Kahi Chandru	
2011	O Manase		
2011	Puttakkana Highway		
2012	Shikari		
2015	Luv U Alia	Cook	
2016	Devara Naadalli	Padmakar Shetty	
2016	Sundaranga Jaana	"Wrong Talk" Ramanujam	
2017	Raaga		
2018	Aa Karaala Ratri	Harikatha performer	
2022	Old Monk	Abhigna's father	
2025	Nimde Kathe		

=== Television ===
Year	Title	Role	Notes	Ref.
1986–1987	Sihi Kahi			
198?	Antarala		Hindi serial	
1989	Conductor Kariyappa	Bus conductor		
19??	Crazy Colonel			
1992	Nalapaka	Host		
1998	Mayamruga	Ispeet Raju		
2000–2005	Papa Pandu	Srimathi's father	Also director and producer	
2003–2007	Silli Lalli	—N/a	Also director and producer	
	Rasapaka	Host		
2009–2013	Parvathi Parameshwara	—N/a	As director	
2010–	Bombaat Bhojana	Host		
2011–2013	Panduranga Vittala	—N/a	As director	
2014	Bhojanapriya			
2014	Thaka Dhimi Tha Dancing Star	Contestant		
2016	Adarsha Dampathigalu	Host		
2017	Bigg Boss Kannada	Contestant	Season 5	
2018–2020	Papa Pandu 2	Nimbehuli Baba	Also director and producer	
2019–2020	Silli Lalli 2	—N/a	Also director and producer	
2020–2022	Nannarasi Radhe	Santhosh Rathod		
2021	Cookku with Kirikku	Judge		
2022	Jodi No 1	Guest		
2023	Weekend with Ramesh	Guest		
2023	Amruthadhare	Sadashiva		
2025	Ayyana Mane			

=== Music videos ===
Year	Title	Artist	Album	Ref.
2020	"Happy"	All Ok	—	
