= Mithra (actor) =

Indian film actor

- Born: Shinu George; 12 May 1977 (age 49); Kottayam, Kerala, India
- Occupations: Actor, producer
- Years active: 2003–present
- Known for: Silli Lalli; Bigg Boss Kannada 3
- Website: Actor Mithra

Mithra (Shinu George; born 12 May 1977) is an Indian actor, stand-up comedian, television actor, producer and entrepreneur, who has mainly worked in Kannada cinema. He debuted as a small time actor in the film Sri Ram in 2003 and went on to appear in more than 100 films. Prior to films, he worked as a tourists' entertainer in Coorg district of Karnataka. Following this, he appeared in a host of television comedy sitcoms such as Silli Lalli, Papa Pandu and Parijatha. He also participated in various reality shows such as Bigg Boss Kannada 3, Comedy Khiladigalu and Maja With Sruja. He turned producer with the film Raaga in which he plays the lead role along with Bhama.

== Television ==
Shows	Role
Silli Lalli	Janesha
Papa Pandu	Janesha
Parijaatha	Lawyer Tippeshi
Comedy Darbaar	Himself
Comedy Khiladigalu	Himself
Comedy Stars	Host
Maja With Sruja	Himself
Comedy Circle	Various characters
Bigg Boss Kannada 3	Himself

== Partial filmography ==
- Sri Ram (2003)
- Duniya (2007)
- Aramane (2008)
- Zindagi (2008)
- Rocky (2008)
- Circus (2009)
- Passenger (2009)
- Rajakumari (2009)
- Olave Jeevana Lekkachaara (2009)
- Manasaare (2009)
- Pancharangi (2010)
- Vaare Vah (2010)
- Jackie (2010)
- Bindaas Hudugi (2010)
- Ullasa Utsaha (2010)
- Olave Vismaya (2010)
- Nanjanagudu Nanjunda (2010)
- Yaksha (2010)
- Aithalakkadi (2010)
- Bindas Hudugi (2010)
- Kaanchaana (2011)
- 90 (2011)
- Lifeu Ishtene (2011)
- Dev S/o Mudde Gowda (2012)
- Ko Ko (2012)
- Drama (2012)
- Romeo (2012)
- Nandeesha (2012)
- Ondu Kshanadalli (2012)
- Kotlallappo Kai (2013)
- Kool...Sakkath Hot Maga (2013)
- Mandahasa (2013)
- Teenage (2013)
- Chatrapathi (2013)
- Raja Huli (2013)
- Topiwala (2013)
- Chaddi Dosth (2013)
- Victory (2013)
- Jungle Jackie (2013)
- Ugramm (2014)
- Dudhsagar (2014)
- Karnataka Ayodhyapuram (2014)
- Nan Life Alli (2014)
- Agraja (2014)
- Baasu, Ade Haley Kathe (2014)
- Jamboo Savari (2014)
- Anarkali (2014)
- Ee Dil Helide Nee Bekantha (2014)
- Patharagitthi (2015)
- Sapnon Ki Rani (2015)
- Eradondla Mooru (2015)
- Jaathre (2015)
- Cigarette (2015)
- Nithya Jothe Sathya (2016)
- Sharp Shooter (2015)
- Style King (2016)
- Deal Raja (2016)
- Jilebi (2017)
- Raaga (2017) (also producer)
- Smuggler (2017)
- Aadu Aata Aadu (2017)
- Raja Loves Radhe (2018)
- Damayanthi (2019)
- Sarvajanikarige Suvarnavakasha (2019)
- Raghavendra Stores (2023)
