= Akka Pakka =

- Directed by: UK Das
- Written by: UK Das
- Starring: Ravishankar Gowda; Tabla Nani; Radhika Gandhi
- Release date: April 12, 2013
- Running time: 133 minutes
- Country: India
- Language: Kannada

Akka Pakka is a 2013 Kannada comedy film directed by UK Das. The film was produced by Lalitha Deep Arts. The film is loosely based on the 1989 American film See No Evil, Hear No Evil which was also the inspiration for Hindi movies Hum Hain Kamaal Ke and Pyare Mohan, Marathi movie Eka Peksha Ek, Tamil movie Andipatti Arasampatti and Kannada movie Baduku Jataka Bandi.

== Cast ==
- Ravishankar Gowda as Harikrishna alias Hakka
- Tabla Nani as Bhuvan alias Bukka
- Radhika Gandhi as Pooja
- Jayasheela
- Lata
- Honnavalli Krishna
- Santhosh Bandari as Kamath
- Aravind

== Soundtrack ==
Akka Pakka

Soundtrack album by Ajaneesh
- Released: 2013
- Recorded: 2013
- Genre: Feature film soundtrack
- Language: Kannada

Official audio
- Akka Pakka - Full Album on YouTube

Track listing
No.	Title	Singer(s)	Length
1.	"Hakka Buakka"	Ram, Ajaneesh
2.	"Kuniside Kuniside"	Shamitha Malnad

== Reception ==
=== Critical response ===
A critic from The Times of India scored the film at 2 out of 5 stars and says "With a poor script and weak narration, the director fails to impress in any part of the movie. While Ravishankaragowda and Tabla Nani give a comic relief, Jayasheela steals the show with her excellent performance. It’s better if very little is discussed about the movie". A critic from Bangalore Mirror wrote "The role of the speech impaired person he did in Snehitaru, though as one among the five leading men is better career-wise than playing the hearing impaired role in films like Akka Pakka. A smaller role in an A grade film is always better than playing the lead in a B grader".
