= Ravishankar Gowda =

Indian actor

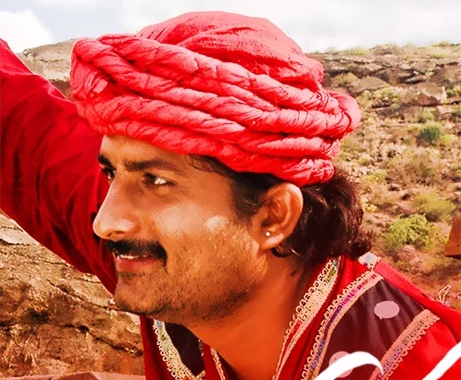
- Ravishankar Gowda in 2008 Kannada film Payana
- Born: Ravishankar; Keelara, Mandya, Karnataka, India
- Occupation: Actor
- Spouse: Sangeetha Gururaj (m. 2003)
- Children: 2
- Relatives: Manjula Gururaj (mother-in-law)

Ravishankar Gowda is an Indian actor who works in the Kannada film industry. He is known mostly for his comic roles in television and films. He acted as Dr. Vittal Rao, in the sitcom Silli Lalli which aired on ETV Kannada.

== Career ==
Gowda appeared in the very popular Kannada sitcom Silli Lalli, playing the role of Dr. Vittal Rao, that aired on ETV Kannada. It ran for over 1,100 episodes. Following this stint in television, he appeared in a lead role in the 2008 film, Payana. He performed in the 2012 film Snehitaru. In the film, he plays the role of a deaf character. His other movies are Nanjangud Nanjunda (2010), Akka Pakka (2013), Mangana Kaiyalli Manikya (2013) and Jai Lalitha (2014).

== Personal life ==
Gowda is from Mandya. He travelled to Bangalore in 1993 in search of opportunities to become a singer. He married Sangeetha, a singer, and daughter of singer Manjula Gururaj, in an Arya Samaj-style wedding in February 2003.

== Filmography ==
=== Films ===
Year	Title	Roles	Notes
2003	Neenilde Nanu Illa Kane	Dr. Varun	
2003	Smile	Eshwar	
2008	Payana	Ravi	Debut as Lead
2009	Mr. Painter	Shanta Kumar	
2010	Bombat Car		
2010	Mathe Mungaru	Kutty	
2010	Nanjangud Nanjunda	Nanjunda	
2010	Bindaas Hudugi		
2011	Panchamrutha	Aditya	segment "Samarasave Jeevana: harmonious life"
2011	Dhan Dhana Dhan	Dr. Kamath	
2011	Jogayya	Muttal	
2012	Bhagavantha Kai Kotta	Shankar	
2012	Snehitaru	Soundesha	
2013	Devarane	Chitteswamy	
2013	Akka Pakka	Harikrishna / Hakka	
2013	Gandhi Jayanti		
2013	Mangana Kaiyalli Manikya	Ranganna	
2014	Crazy Star		
2014	Nage Bomb		
2014	Navarangi		
2014	Jai Lalitha	Lakshmikantha	
2015	Ond Chance Kodi	Nakula	
2015	Ram-Leela	"Boiling Star" Bablu	
2016	Kiragoorina Gayyaligalu		
2016	John Jani Janardhan		
2016	Sundaranga Jaana	Ali	SIIMA Award for Best Actor in a Comic Role
2017	Sarkari Kelasa Devara Kelasa		
2017	Athiratha		
2018	Vanilla	Police Inspector	
2018	Orange	Rukmini's husband	
2019	99	Murali	
2019	Geetha	Ramesha	
2019	Gimmick	Prathap	
2019	Mane Maratakkide	Ram	
2019	Odeya	Krishnamurthy	
2020	Aadyaa	Lokesh	
2021	Yuvarathnaa	Professor	
2021	Kotigobba 3	Sundar	
2021	Rathnan Prapancha	Ahmed Ali	
2021	Sakath	Lawyer	
2022	Vikrant Rona	Vishwanath Ballal	
2022	Ravi Bopanna		
2022	Triple Riding	Inspector Annaiah	
2023	Raghavendra Stores	Madhu	
2023	Sreemanta		
2025	Agnyathavasi		
2025	Just Married	Vinay	
2025	GST		

=== Television ===
Year	Title	Role	Notes
2001	Kavyanjali		
	Minchu Minchina Balli		
2003	Silli Lalli	Dr. Vittal Rao	
2016	Majaa Talkies	Guest	
