= Sreemanta =

- Directed by: Hassan Ramesh
- Produced by: Sanjay V. Babu, G Narayanappa, T. K. Ramesha
- Starring: Kranti Revana Siddappa; Vaishnavi Patwardhan; Vaishnavi Chandran Menon
- Cinematography: Ravi Kumar Sana; K. M. Vishnuvardhan
- Edited by: K. M. Prakash
- Music by: Hamsalekha
- Release date: 19 May 2023
- Running time: 179 minutes
- Country: India
- Language: Kannada

Sreemanta is a 2023 Kannada language drama film written and directed by Hassan Ramesh. The film was produced by Sanjay V. Babu, G Narayanappa, and T. K. Ramesha. The music of the film was composed by Hamsalekha. It stars Kranti Revana Siddappa, Vaishnavi Patwardhan and Vaishnavi Chandran Menon. Ramesh Bhat, Kalyani Raju, and Ravishankar Gowda play supporting roles. Sonu Sood makes a cameo, which was projected by the makers to be the lead role.

== Plot ==
The plot begins with a hamlet experiencing a serious water shortage due to a lack of rain in recent years, so the poor people do a puja to the rain god. This causes torrential rains, which delights entire villages as they develop piles of crops. Because of the harvest, the villagers hold a big fair, which introduces the meat of the story. The main protagonist, Krishna, who is beloved by the villagers, portrays Abhimanyu in a mythological play, which leads him to meet and fall in love with a girl from Mumbai, which hurts rural girl Padma, who always wants Krishna well, resulting in a plot twist.

== Cast ==
- Kranti Revana Siddappa as Krishna
- Vaishnavi Patwardhan as Ruchi
- Vaishnavi Chandran Menon as Padma
- Sonu Sood
- Sadhu Kokila
- Ramesh Bhat
- Kalyani Raju
- Ravishankar Gowda
- Charan Raj
- Raju Talikote
- Kuri Ranga
- Bank Manjanna
- Basavaraju Hassan
- Madhugiri Prakash

== Reception ==
The Times of India gave the film a 2.0 rating out of 5.
