= Luv U Alia =

- movie poster
- Directed by: Indrajit Lankesh
- Screenplay by: Indrajit Lankesh; Janardhana Maharshi
- Story by: Indrajit Lankesh
- Produced by: Sammy Nanwani
- Starring: V. Ravichandran; Bhumika Chawla; Chandan Kumar; Nikesha Patel
- Cinematography: Santosh Rai Pathaje
- Edited by: Suresh D. H.
- Music by: Songs: Jassie Gift; Score: Dharma Vish
- Production company: Sammy's Magic Cinema
- Distributed by: IGI Resonance I Pal Enterprises
- Release date: 17 September 2015
- Running time: 141 minutes
- Country: India
- Language: Kannada

Luv U Alia is a 2015 Indian Kannada-language romance drama film written and directed by director Indrajit Lankesh and starring V. Ravichandran, Bhumika Chawla, Chandan Kumar and Nikesha Patel and Sangeeta Chauhan. The film was originally supposed to be additionally shot in Hindi; however, the Hindi version was dropped in favor of a dubbed release. The film was released on 17 September 2015. The Hindi dubbed version was released on 17 June 2016. Luv U Alia is produced by Sammy's Magic Cinema. The cinematography was performed by Santosh Rai Pathaje and the film was edited by Suresh D. H. The soundtrack was composed by Jassie Gift, who collaborated with Dharma Vish to score the background music. The production was launched on 26 October 2014.

== Plot ==
Alia is a college student. After spending an evening locked in a car during a rainstorm with fellow student Arhaan, the two share personal details with one another.

== Cast ==
- V. Ravichandran as Dr. Ravi
- Bhumika Chawla as Bhoomi
- Chandan Kumar as Kiran
- Sangeita Chauhan as Alia
- P. Ravi Shankar as Zulfi
- Sayaji Shinde
- Sadhu Kokila
- Sudharani
- Shakeela
- Bhavya
- Aditi Acharya
- Prashanth Siddi
- Bullet Prakash
- Sihi Kahi Chandru as Cook
- Sudeepa in a cameo appearance
- Dhyan in a cameo appearance as Suman
- Nikesha Patel in a cameo appearance
- Srujan Lokesh in a cameo appearance
- Indrajit Lankesh in a cameo appearance
- Sunny Leone in an item number "Kamakshi"

== Soundtrack ==
Luv U Alia

Soundtrack album by Jassie Gift
- Released: 15 June 2015
- Genre: Feature film soundtrack
- Length: 21:21
- Label: Anand Audio

The soundtrack was composed by Jassie Gift, lyrics for which was penned Kaviraj. The soundtrack album consists of five tracks. The track "Kuntre Nintre", a remixed version of a track of the same name from the 1985 film Trishula, was included in the album. Poet Siddalingaiah had written the lyrics for the track, and the remixed version featured additional lyrics by Kaviraj. The album was released on 15 June 2015 in the studios of the sketch comedy show, Majaa Talkies in Bangalore, as part of the film's promotions.

Track listing
No.	Title	Lyrics	Singer(s)	Length
1.	"Sanje Veleli"	Kaviraj	Javed Ali	5:37
2.	"Kanase Kanninda"	Kaviraj	Karthik, Shreya Ghoshal	5:17
3.	"Kamakshi"	Kaviraj	Santhosh Venky, Richa Paul	3:26
4.	"Kuntre Nintre"	Siddalingaiah, Kaviraj	Sunitha	3:27
5.	"Haradide Manasu"	Kaviraj	Palak Muchhal	3:34
Total length:				21:21

Hindi (dubbed) tracklist
No.	Title	Singer(s)	Length
1.	"Sapne"	Palak Muchhal, Ashwin Bhandare
2.	"Luv U Alia"	Javed Ali
3.	"Kamakshi"	Shaan, Richa Paul
4.	"Sote Jogte"	Manisha Jambotkar

=== Critical reception ===
The New Indian Express in its review wrote that the music "add[ed] texture" to the film "through songs" with "Jessie's tactful music and Kaviraj's lyrics". The reviewer felt, "the song 'Sanje velali' adds to the charm of the film."

== Release and reception ==
Writing for The New Indian Express, A. Sharadhaa wrote, "A contemporary family drama, Luv U Alia does not come across as a mishmash of characters, but has a streamlined narration that takes you through the nuances of love, marriage and divorce." She added, "Indrajit has created situational set pieces that do justice to the ensemble star cast and backdrops... Cinematographer Santhosh Rai Pathaje has followed Indrajit's narrative perfectly. Even Ravi Shankar comes across as a cool antagonist and brings out the lighter side of his character." and further wrote, "While senior actors like Ravichandran and Bhoomika seem quite comfortable with their roles, it is the young Chandan who makes the most out of this romantic family drama." Reviewing the film for The Hindu, Archana Nathan calling the film "flamboyant but vacuous", wrote, "With every frame, Indrajit constructs a specific kind of spectacle — an upper class, glossy one full of revving bikes, exotic locations and five star hotels. However, there is very little strength in the script of the film to carry these grand frames successfully until the end." Shyam Prasad S. of Bangalore Mirror rated the film three out of five, and wrote, "Luv U Alia is a visual extravaganza; colourful with eye candy" and added, "The first half of the film is a comedy shouldered by Ravishankar as a bumbling don. It is in the second half that the real story between Ravichandran and Bhoomika opens up. But here the comedy of Sadhu Kokila and Shakeela is a drag and the film would have done without it and made the second half a lot crispier."

S. Viswanath of Deccan Herald also rated the film 3/5 and wrote, "Lankesh highlights how personal egos and overt professional pursuits drive otherwise perfect couples to divorce, the marital discord having an impact on the children of such marriages." He concluded writing, "The comic interludes are horrendous and the romantic bits reprehensible" and criticized the performance of the cast. Shashiprasad S. M. of Deccan Chronicle rated the film 2/5 and wrote, "Regardless of the outcome, every frame the director has captured through his cinematographer looks like a beautiful painting worth preserving it with a frame." He concluded criticizing the film's "unsavory comedy" and further wrote, "[t]hough the director’s good intention looks good talking about the sensitive issue such as divorce and its repercussion on the child but unfortunately it does not feel good after more than hours of experience."
