= Ee Dil Helide Nee Bekantha =

- Theatrical release poster
- Directed by: TM Srinivasa
- Written by: TM Srinivasa
- Produced by: Sridhara S
- Starring: Avinash Diwakar; Sri Sruthi
- Cinematography: H K Chidananda
- Music by: Satish Aryan
- Production company: Sai Krishna Enterprises
- Release date: 31 October 2014
- Country: India
- Language: Kannada

Ee Dil Helide Nee Bekantha is a 2014 Indian Kannada-language romance drama film directed by TM Srinivasa and produced by Sridhara S under the banner of Sai Krishna Enterprises. It stars Avinash Diwakar and Sri Sruthi.

== Cast ==
- Avinash Diwakar as Balu
- Sri Sruthi as Priya
- Mithra
- Shashank Bangalore

== Production ==
The film was shot in Bengaluru, Thirthahalli and Shivamogga.

== Music ==
Ee Dil Helide Nee Bekantha

Soundtrack album by Satish Aryan
- Released: 6 May 2014
- Genre: Feature film soundtrack
- Length: 29:16
- Label: Kamadhenu Audio & Video

The soundtrack album of the film has been composed by Satish Aryan, who makes his debut as a music director with this. Lyrics of the songs have been written by S Sridhara.

=== Track listing ===
All lyrics are written by S Sridhara; all music is composed by Satish Aryan.

No.	Title	Singer(s)	Length
1.	"Dildu Formula"	Tippu	4:30
2.	"Modala Barige"	Shreya Ghoshal, Satish Aryan	4:27
3.	"Hrudayada Vishaya"	Satish Aryan	2:46
4.	"Lavvu Madi"	Vijay Prakash	4:36
5.	"Savira Januma"	Hemanth, Supriya Lohith	4:42
6.	"Ninu Ethake"	Sneha	2:03
7.	"Hanneru Bindege"	Meghana Kulkarni, Sneha	0:42
8.	"Hennu Ninnadaythu"	Rajesh Krishnan, Sneha	5:30

== Reception ==
=== Critical reception ===
GS Kumar of The Times of India rated the film 2.5/5 stars and wrote, "With an incredible performance, Avinash has proved once again that he’s talented enough to essay any role. Sri Shruthi deserves accolades for her expressions and dialogue delivery. Music by Sathish Aryan and camerawork by H K Chidananda are average".
