= Hum Hain Kamaal Ke =

Hum Hain Kamaal Ke हम हैं कमाल के
- Directed by: Vijay Reddy
- Written by: Anwar Khan
- Story by: Anwar Khan
- Produced by: Ashok Adnani; Lal Purswani
- Starring: Sheeba; Sujoy Mukherjee; Kader Khan; Anupam Kher; Aruna Irani; Sadashiv Amrapurkar; Raza Murad
- Cinematography: Ashok Rao
- Edited by: V.N. Mayekar
- Music by: Naresh Sharma; Raju Singh
- Production company: Tridev Films
- Release date: 29 October 1993
- Country: India
- Language: Hindi

Hum Hain Kamaal Ke (Hindi: हम हैं कमाल के) is a 1993 Hindi-language action-comedy film directed by Vijay Reddy. The film had a multi star cast; Sheeba, Sujoy Mukherjee, with Kader Khan, Anupam Kher, Aruna Irani, Sadashiv Amrapurkar, Raza Murad and others. This movie was produced by Ashok Adnani, directed by Vijay Reddy and story was written by Anwar Khan. The film is loosely based on the 1989 American film See No Evil, Hear No Evil which was also the inspiration for Marathi movie Eka Peksha Ek, Tamil movie Andipatti Arasampatti and Kannada movies Akka Pakka and Baduku Jataka Bandi.

== Plot ==
The film revolves around two physically challenged friends; Nilamber (Kader Khan) and Pitamber (Anupam Kher). Nilambar is deaf and Pitamber is blind since birth. Both friends developed special skills and also good coordination between themselves, due to which others fail to realize that they are differently abled. Jebago (Raza Murad) is head of some gangsters. Nilambar and Pitamber attempt to solve a murder mystery with series of comic mishaps.

== Cast ==
- Sheeba as Shalu
- Kader Khan as Peetambar
- Anupam Kher as Neelambar
- Aruna Irani as Lado Ghodpade
- Raza Murad as Zibago
- Sadashiv Amrapurkar as Inspector Ghodpade
- Rakesh Bedi as Police Constable Heera
- Sameer Khakhar as Police Constable Panna
- Sujoy Mukherjee as Vishal
- Dilip Dhawan as Manish
- Seema Deo as Vishal Mother
- Mahesh Anand as Danny
- Amita Nangia as Kunika
- Tiku Talsania as Rickshawala
- Anjan Srivastav as Police Commissioner
- Yunus Parvez as Doctor
- Bob Christo as Diamond exchanger
- Rucha Gujarathi as Baby Rucha

== Songs ==
All songs are written by Rani Malik. Soundtrack is available on Tips Music.

- "Kitne Haseen Kitne Jawan" –

Alka Yagnik

- "Kitne Haseen Kitne Jawan" –

S. P. Balasubrahmanyam

- "Nazron Ka Kya Kasoor" –

S. P. Balasubrahmanyam, Alka Yagnik

- "Sun Sun Re Sajan" –

S. P. Balasubrahmanyam, Alka Yagnik

- "Agar Tum Hum Se" –

S. P. Balasubrahmanyam, Alka Yagnik

- "Bas Yahi Jee Chahta Hai" –

Kumar Sanu, Alka Yagnik

- "Mere Paas Bachi Nahi Kaudi" –

Sudesh Bhosle, Falguni Seth

- "Kaise Mujhe Chhua Yeh Batao Na" –

Alisha Chinai
