= Looty (2018 film) =

- Poster
- Directed by: Girish Kamplapur
- Written by: Girish Kamplapur
- Produced by: N. M. Niranjan
- Starring: Isha Koppikar; Dhruv Sharma; Shweta Pandit
- Cinematography: Ganga Rajendran
- Edited by: Dhamodhar Kanasur
- Music by: Dharma Vish
- Production company: Studio Focus
- Release date: 30 November 2018
- Country: India
- Language: Kannada

Looty is a 2018 Indian Kannada-language crime thriller film directed by Girish Kamplapur and starring Isha Koppikar as a cop, in her return to Kannada cinema after a gap of seventeen and a half years, alongside Dhruv Sharma and Shweta Pandit.

Having started production in 2013, the film released after a four-year delay.

== Cast ==
- Isha Koppikar as ACP Durga Bhavani
- Dhruv Sharma as Jaggi
- Shweta Pandit
- Sadhu Kokila
- Kaddipudi Chandru
- Andrea D'Souza
- Deepika Das
- Robo Ganesh
- B. Jayashree as a mentally ill ragpicker
- Dileep Raj
- Rishank Tiwari as Inspector Ballu
- Chemban Vinod Jose

== Soundtrack ==
The music was composed by Dharma Vish. Isha Koppikar and Dhruv Sharma shot for a song choreographed by Imran Sadhariya in Bangalore in 2014.

Track listing
No.	Title	Singer(s)	Length
1.	"Dangerous"	Aisha Sayed	4:46
2.	"Looty"	Usha Uthup	5:01
3.	"Khushi E Khushi"	Avinash Chebbi, Supriya Lohith	4:14
4.	"Khushi Va Khushi"	Nakul Abhyankar, Sangeetha Rajeev	4:14
5.	"Malavalli"	Nagendra, Supriya Lohith	4:23
6.	"Koditelike"	Ramanujam, Supriya Lohith	4:23
Total length:			27:01

== Reception ==
A critic from The New Indian Express wrote "Although curiosity simmers around the film because of its title and the presence of Bollywood actress Isha Koppikar as the protagonist, it successfully manages to get rid of your curiosity within the first few frames of the film". A critic from The Times of India rated the film 1 1/2 out of 5 stars and wrote that "Director Girish Kamplapur's attempt to churn out a thriller by keeping a bank robbery as the theme falls flat. Perhaps, if he had concentrated more on robbery operation and on investigative angle it might been a better watch". A critic from The News Minute wrote "Looty sets a new standard for how to make a bad film. Director Girish Kamplapur's attempt to bring out a comedy thriller falls flat in every category. The story lacks intensity, the actors look tired and drained and the joke is on us for paying money to watch the film. The little said about the music, the better".
