= Payana =

- Official poster
- Directed by: Kiran Govi
- Produced by: C. Venkatesh
- Starring: Ravishankar Gowda; Ramanithu Chaudhary
- Music by: V. Harikrishna
- Release date: 17 October 2008
- Country: India
- Language: Kannada

Payana (transl. Journey) is a 2008 Indian Kannada-language romantic drama film directed by Kiran Govi and starring Ravishankar Gowda and Ramanithu Chaudhary.

== Cast ==
- Ravishankar Gowda as Ravishankar
- Ramanithu Chaudhary as Kaveri
- Sarath Babu as Kaveri's father
- Chitra Shenoy
- Rangayana Raghu
- Mandya Ramesh
- Bullet Prakash
- Shivaram
- Jayalakshmi
- M. S. Umesh
- Michael Madhu

== Soundtrack ==
The music was composed by V. Harikrishna.

Track listing
| No. | Title | Singer(s) | Length |
|---|---|---|---|
| 1. | "Chandira Muduva" | Shaan | 4:41 |
| 2. | "Gap Chip" | Sonu Nigam, Suma Shastri | 4:44 |
| 3. | "Jaare Jaare" | Vani Harikrishna, V. Harikrishna | 4:22 |
| 4. | "Lovela Lovela" | L. N. Shastri | 4:11 |
| 5. | "Manasa Gange" | Sonu Nigam | 5:07 |
| 6. | "Modala Olage" | Sonu Nigam | 6:02 |
| 7. | "Yekanthada Mouna" | S. P. Balasubrahmanyam | 4:34 |
| Total length: | | | 33:41 |

== Reception ==
A critic from Rediff.com wrote that "The Kannada film Payana starts on a promising note and ends in a fantastic climax. It has some interesting sequences in the middle too". A critic from IANS wrote that "'Payana' is a must watch, feel-good film". A critic from Bangalore Mirror wrote that "Except for the songs, though they look like remixed versions of Mungaaru Male, there is nothing worthwhile in the film". A critic from Indiaglitz wrote that "Slash 40 minutes of the film and you could watch this one".
