= Mumbai Heroes =

Indian cricket team

- League: Celebrity Cricket League

Personnel
- Captain: Riteish Deshmukh
- Owner: Sohail Khan

Team information
- City: Mumbai, Maharashtra, India
- Founded: 2011; 15 years ago
- Home ground: Brabourne Stadium, Mumbai

History
- CCL wins: 1
- Official website: mumbaiheroes.in

Mumbai Heroes is an Indian celebrity cricket team based in Mumbai, competing in the Celebrity Cricket League (CCL) representing Hindi cinema. The team is made up of celebrities from the Indian film industry. It plays its home matches at Brabourne Stadium.

== History ==
The Mumbai Heroes franchise was established in 2011, and has since been a participant in the Celebrity Cricket League. It consists of actors, directors, producers, and other personalities from the Mumbai film industry, including Riteish Deshmukh, Sohail Khan, Salman Khan, Bobby Deol and Suniel Shetty.

The team won the 8th season (2019) based on group stage performance, and reached the semifinals in the years 2012, 2014, 2015, 2023.

Sohail Khan is the owner of the team, and Kriti Sanon has been its brand ambassador.
