= Eradondla Mooru =

- Poster
- Directed by: Kumar Datt
- Starring: Chandan Kumar; Shwetha Pandit; Shobhitha
- Cinematography: Naveen Kumar
- Edited by: Harish Komme
- Music by: A M Neel
- Release date: 22 May 2015
- Country: India
- Language: Kannada

Eradondla Mooru is a 2015 Indian Kannada language film directed by Kumar Datth. It stars Chandan Kumar, Shwetha Pandit and Shobhitha. The music was composed by A M Neel. It was theatrically released on 22 May 2015.

== Cast ==
- Chandan Kumar as Prem
- Shwetha Pandit
- Shobhitha
- K. S. Sridhar
- Mithra
- Gopi
- Aradhya
- Ranjini

== Reception ==
=== Critical response ===
Archana Nathan from The Hindu wrote "The only time that the film strikes a chord with the viewer is when one of the characters unwittingly says, “the script has no clarity.” One couldn't agree more. Eradondla Mooru not only gets its mathematics jumbled up, but its script too". A Sharadhaa from The New Indian Express said "Chandan and Swetha Pandit have sincerely followed the director’s thoughts. Shobitha lacks expressions to play her part. Mitra’s role as a thief does not work. Naveen Kumar’s cinematography is static rather than a cinematic treat. AM Neel’s music does not enchant". A reviewer from Deccan Herald wrote "Eradondla Mooru should be visited and its inherent pitpalls glossed over, and its integrity to tread a different trail, appreciated". Shyam Prasad S from Bangalore Mirror says "The supposed comedy scenes involving Mitra too fall flat. A scene in which he has sex with a woman while burgling a house must be one of the dumbest in a long time. He spends a few days in screen time in the boot of a car".
