= Kicchu =

2018 Indian Kannada-language film

- Release poster
- Directed by: Pradeep Raj
- Based on: Hotti Uriva Kichchinalli by Pradeep Raj
- Produced by: M. Anthony Pradeep
- Starring: Dhruv Sharma; Sudeepa; P. Saikumar; Suchendra Prasad; Abhinaya; Ragini Dwivedi
- Music by: Arjun Janya
- Production company: Indirajal Advertisement Solutions
- Release date: 4 May 2018
- Country: India
- Language: Kannada

Kicchu (or Kichchu) is a 2018 Indian Kannada-language thriller drama film starring Dhruv Sharma, Suchendra Prasad, Abhinaya and Ragini Dwivedi. Actor Sudeepa appears in a guest role. The film is an adaptation of Pradeep Raj's novel Hotti Uriva Kichchinalli. The film notably stars two speech and hearing impaired persons in the lead (Sharma and Abhinaya). The film released a year after Dhruv Sharma's death.

== Cast ==
- Dhruv Sharma as Suri
- Suchendra Prasad as Devanna
- Abhinaya
- Ragini Dwivedi
- P. Sai Kumar as Police officer
- Pradeep Raj
- Sudeepa in cameo role

== Production ==
The film was shot in Malenadu. Ragini Dwivedi played a deglam role for the first time in her career.

== Music ==
The music for the film was composed by Arjun Janya.

Kicchu

Soundtrack album by Arjun Janya
- Released: 2018
- Genre: Feature film soundtrack
- Length: 18:13
- Language: Kannada
- Label: Anand Audio

Arjun Janya chronology
Kannadakkaagi Ondannu Otti (2018)	Kicchu (2018)	Ayogya (2018)

Track listing
No.	Title	Lyrics	Singer(s)	Length
1.	"Mylekuntha Madesha"	Ghouse Peer	Kailash Kher, Suchendra Prasad	4:35
2.	"Ughey Ughey"	Ghouse Peer	Vijay Prakash	5:02
3.	"Spandana"	Ghouse Peer	Shreya Ghoshal	3:40
4.	"Vanadevi Preetiya"	Ghouse Peer	Vijay Prakash	4:56
Total length:				18:13

== Reception ==
A critic from The New Indian Express opined that "Kicchu gives an insight into deforestation, and its effects on people, but somehow, on the whole, a sensitive subject like this one seems to lack depth". Guruprasad D. M. of Deccan Herald wrote that "Even with good intentions, Kicchu is dull, cliched and too flat on emotions". Sunayana Suresh of The Times of India rated the film 3 out of 5 and stated that "Kichchu might not be a drama that keeps you in the edge of your seat, but it has its heart set in the right place".
