= Yahoo (film) =

- Directed by: Seetharam Karanth
- Written by: Krish Joshi
- Screenplay by: Seetharam Karanth
- Produced by: G. Dhakshayini; Sukanya
- Starring: Saurav; Neetha; Dattatreya
- Cinematography: Makarandha Joshi
- Edited by: T. Govardhan
- Music by: M. N. Krupakar
- Production company: Entertainer's
- Release date: 10 September 2004
- Country: India
- Language: Kannada

Yahoo is a 2004 Indian Kannada-language horror film directed by Seetharam Karanth and starring Saurav, Neetha and Dattatreya. The film is based on a true incident that happened in a house in Haladi. The film was released on 10 December 2004 along with Praana.

== Cast ==
- Saurav as Gundu
- Neetha as Geethu
- Bhanuprakash as Bhanu
- Jayaram Shetty as Shiva
- Netra Sindhiya as Madhu
- Raghavendra Kamath as Appi
- Dattatreya as Haladi Nagappa’s ghost
- Suresh Sharma
- Dhruv Sharma as Sneha's lover
- Srividya
- Raghavendra Maiyya

== Production ==
The film was shot in Hiliyana Doddmane, an eight-hundred-year-old house. Havyaka Kannada and Tala-Maddale were used in the film.

== Reception ==
A critic from Deccan Herald wrote that "The director has taken care neither to justify the existence of ghosts nor their absence. He has left to the audience to decide. Five films released so far (Sagari, Kanakambari, Bidalare, Aptha Mithra and now Yahoo) have stories related to ghosts. But among all these, surely, the ghost in this film, is intelligent".

A critic from Sify wrote that "Dattatreya as Haladi Nagappa’s ghost who appears after interval has done his role convincingly. The highlight of the film is the camerawork of Makarand Joshi who has lend credence to the suspense and horror with perfect lighting. The background eerie music of M. N. Kripakar is impressive while songs are just ok. The performances of Saurav, Neetha and Dhruva Sharma in a small role are all good".
