= Cookku with Kirikku =

Indian Kannada-language comedy cooking reality programme

- Genre: Cookery; Comedy
- Based on: Cooku with Comali
- Directed by: Media Masons
- Presented by: Akul Balaji
- Judges: Sihi Kahi Chandru; Venkatesh Bhat; Chef Adarsh.
- Theme music composer: Karthik Sharma
- Country of origin: India
- Original language: Kannada
- No. of seasons: 1
- No. of episodes: 32

Production
- Camera setup: Multi-camera
- Running time: approx.60-62 minutes
- Production company: Media Masons

Original release
- Network: Star Suvarna
- Release: 10 April – 15 August 2021

Cookku with Kirikku is a Kannada-language comedy-based cooking competition show which premiered on 10 April 2021. It aired on Star Suvarna and streaming on Disney+ Hotstar, the contestants are paired each week with Kirikkus (comedians) who are amateur cooks. The contestants along with their Kirikkus are challenged every week and judged by Sihi Kahi Chandru, Chef Venkatesh Bhat and Chef Adarsh. The show is a remake of Tamil reality show Cooku with Comali.

== Production ==
=== Game format ===
Each week, the show starts with celebrity chefs getting paired with their Kirikkus. The teams then compete in two Advantage Tasks, followed by the Main Task, and finally the Immunity/Elimination Task.

The Advantage Task involves the teams completing a small task, with the winner being given an advantage during the Main Task, such as the team being able to choose a time frame within which to work without any obstacles.

During the Main Task, every team is given a challenge or an obstacle that will make cooking more difficult. The teams are given a specific time limit in which to cook within.

Most of the cooking tasks are to be done by Kirikkus. The cook that gets Immunity is safe from next week's elimination and so does not participate. Some weeks are celebration rounds with no elimination.

== Series overview ==
Series	Host	Judges	Winner	Runner up	Episodes	Originally released		
Series	Host	Judges	Winner	Runner up	Episodes	First released	Last released	Network
1	Akul Balaji	Sihi Kahi Chandru; Chef Venkatesh Bhat; Chef Adarash	Chandan Kumar	Ishitha Varsha	32	10 April 2021	15 August 2021	Star Suvarna

=== Contestants ===
Contestants	Status	Notes
Chandan Kumar	Winner	
Ishitha Varsha	1st Runner-Up	Wild Card
Kirik Keerthi	2nd Runner-Up	
Kavitha Gowda	Eliminated	
Lasya Nagraj	Eliminated	
Remo	Eliminated	
Vanitha Vasu	Eliminated	
Arun Hraiharan	Eliminated	Wild Card
Sunethra Pandit	Eliminated	Wild Card
Apoorva	Walked	
Sundar	Walked	

=== Kirikku's ===
Pratham
Arun Sagar
Chaitra Vasudevan
Karunya Ram
Nayana
Abhighna Bhat
Jagappa
Vishwa

=== Pairings ===
Cooks (based on Rank in the Show)	Week 1	Week 2	Week 3	Week 4	Week 5	Week 6	Week 7	Week 8	Week 9	Week 10	Week 11	Week 12 (Ticket to Finale)	Week 13	Week 14	
Chandan Kumar	Abhijana Bhat	Lokesh	Abhijana Bhat	Jagappa	Immunity	Vishwa	Abhijana Bhat	Arun Sagar	Abhijana Bhat	Jagappa	Vishwa	Pratham	Direct Finalist	Vishwa	Abhijna Bhat & Chaitra Vasudevan
Ishitha Varsha				Karunya Ram	Nayana	Arun Sagar	Immunity	Karunya Ram	Immunity	Vishwa	Nayana	Arun Sagar	Vishwa	Jagappa	Nayana & Pratham
Kirik Keerthi	Arun Sagar	Abhijana Bhat	Arun Sagar	Chaitra Vasudevan	Karunya Ram	Nayana	Pratham	Nayana	Jagappa	Arun Sagar	Abhijana Bhat	Nayana	Pratham	Abhijna Bhat	Jagappa & Arun Sagar
Kavitha Gowda	Vishwa	Jagappa	Nayana	Vishwa	Abhijana Bhat	Chaitra Vasudevan	Arun Sagar	Jagappa	Karunya Ram	Karunya Ram	Arun Sagar	Abhijna Bhat	Arun Sagar	Nayana	Vishwa & Lokesh
Lasya Nagraj	Pratham	Arun Sagar	Vishwa	Nayana	Vishwa	Abhijana Bhat	Jagappa	Pratham	Vishwa	Pratham	Pratham	Jagappa	Jagappa	Evicted (Episode 30)	
Remo	Karunya Ram	Pratham					Nayana	Abhijana Bhat	Nayana	Abhijana Bhat	Jagappa	Evicted (Episode 24)			
Vanitha Vasu	Lokesh	Karunya Ram					Vishwa	Vishwa	Pratham	Evicted (Episode 20)					
Arun Hariharan				Pratham	Pratham	Pratham	Lokesh	Evicted (Episode 16)							
Sunethra Pandit				Abhijana Bhat	Chaitra Vasudevan	Evicted (Episode 14)									
Apoorva	Nayana	Vishwa	Karunya Ram	Arun Sagar	Arun Sagar	Karunya Ram	Walked (Episode 14)								
Sundar	Chaitra Vasudevan	Nayana	Bala	Walked (Episode 4)											

=== Weekly activities ===
Advantage Tasks

Week	Task	Winner
1	Cone Dosa Making	Chandan Kumar - Abhijna Bhat; Vanitha Vasu - Lokesh
2	Half Boil Making	Chandan Kumar - Lokesh; Vanitha Vasu - Karunya Ram; Kirik Keerthi - Abhijhna Bhat
3	Cola Making	Lasya Nagraj - Vishwa
4	Find the Ingredients	Chandan Kumar - Jagappa
5	Samosa Making	Sunethra Pandit - Chaitra Vasudevan
6	Onion Slicing	Apoorva - Karunya Ram
7	Panipuri Eating	Kavitha Gowda - Arun Sagar
8	Taking Coconut Slices	Kavitha Gowda - Jagappa
9	Murukku Making	Kirik Keerthi - Jagappa
10	Making Star Chapatis	Chandan Kumar - Jagappa
11	Moosambi Juice Making	Lasya Nagraj - Pratham
12	Cooking Mini Dosas and Omelettes	Chandan Kumar - Pratham
13	Icing the cake	Ishita Varsha - Vishwa
Finale	Chapathi Making using Iron Box	Kirik Keerthi - Abhijna Bhat; Ishita Varsha - Jagappa
Finale	Peeling the Pumpkin using Knife	Ishita Varsha - Jagappa

Main Tasks

Week	Task	Ingredient Selection	High Scored Contestant	Immunity Task Participants	Immunity Task Winner	Elimination Task Participants	Evicted Person
1	Contestants are handcuffed	Any Ingredient	Chandan Kumar - Abhijna Bhat; Vanitha Vasu - Lokesh	Not Conducted	None	Not Conducted	None
2	Contestants are blindfolded	Banana	Sundar - Nayana	Sundar - Nyana; Vanitha Vasu - Karunya Ram; Lasya Nagraj - Arun Sagar; Kirik Keerthi - Abhijna Bhat	Vanitha Vasu - Karunya Ram	Not Conducted	None
3	Contestants and Kirikkus are provided with high sound headphones	Ingredient selected by respective Comalis	Keerthi - Arun Sagar	Kirik Keerthi - Arun Sagar; Chandan Kumar - Abhijna Bhat; Apoorva - Karunya Ram	Chandan Kumar - Abhijna Bhat	Not Conducted	None
4	Contestant and Kirikkus stand back-to-back and alternate cooking in 10 minutes	Milk Products	Chandan Kumar - Jagappa	Chandan Kumar - Jagappa; Apoorva - Arun Sagar; Kavitha Gowda - Vishwa; Sunethra Pandit - Abhijna Bhat	Chandan Kumar - Jagappa	Not Conducted	None
5	Contestants should wear boxing gloves and Kirikkus should cook	States Special	Lasya Nagraj - Vishwa	Not Conducted	None	Sunethra Pandit - Chaitra Vasudevan; Arun Hariharan - Pratham	Sunethra Pandit
6	Contestants should balance the egg plate and Kirikkus should cook	Colour of Dish and the ball must be same	Arun - Pratham	Keerthi - Nayana; Chandan - Vishwa; Arun Sagar - Ishitha Varsha; Arun - Pratham	Ishitha Varsha - Arun Sagar	Not Conducted	None
7	Contestants are locked and blindfolded, Kirikkus cook the dish	Sea Food	Chandan Kumar - Abhijna Bhat	Not Conducted	None	Vanitha Vasu - Vishwa; Remo - Nayana; Arun Hariharan - Lokesh	Arun Hariharan
8	Traditional Cooking	Traditional Vegetables	Chandan Kumar - Arun Sagar	Vanitha Vasu - Vishwa; Chandan Kumar - Arun Sagar; Keerthi - Nayana; Ishitha Varsha - Karunya Ram	Ishitha Varsha - Karunya Ram	Not Conducted	None
9	30 Minutes Back-to Back Postures	Ingredients given by Judges	Remo - Nayana	Not Conducted	None	Vanitha Vasu - Pratham; Chandan Kumar - Abhijna Bhat; Kavitha Gowda - Karunya Ram	Vanitha Vasu
10	Face-off Challenge	Indian, Continental and Chinese Food	Ishitha Varsha - Vishwa	Not Conducted	None	Chandan Kumar - Abhijna Bhat; Kirik Keerthi - Arun Sagar	None
11	45 Minutes Alternate Cooking by Cook and Kirikku	4 Main Courses	Kavitha Gowda - Arun Sagar	Not Conducted	None	Remo - Jagappa; Kirik Keerthi - Abhijna Bhat	Remo
12	45 Minutes, Cooks and Kirikkus should cycle alternately and cook	Biriyani and Curd	Lasya Nagraj - Jagappa	(Ticket to Finale): Lasya Nagraj - Jagappa; Chandan Kumar - Pratham; Kirik Keerthi - Nayana	Chandan Kumar - Pratham	Not Conducted	None
13	Semi-Finals (45 Minutes, Cooks and Kirikkus should balance shot glasses on scale)	Wrong Combination Vegetables	Not Applicable	Not Applicable	Ishita Varsha - Vishwa	Ishita Varsha - Vishwa; Kirik Keerthi - Pratham; Kavitha Gowda - Arun Sagar; Lasya Nagraj - Jagappa	Lasya Nagraj
14	Grand Finale (15 Minutes: Earphone challenge. 15 Minutes: Egg Balancing. 15 Minutes: standing back to back.	4 Dish Platter	Chandan Kumar - Abhijna Bhat - Chaitra Vasudevan	Not Applicable	Not Applicable	Not Applicable	Not Applicable

=== Guests ===
Sudeep	Inagratuation Episode

== Reception ==
The series gained popularity among viewers mainly on the Hotstar app.

== Adaptations ==
Language	Title	Premiere date	Network	Last Aired	No. of seasons	Notes	Ref
Tamil	Cooku with Comali கோமாலியுடன் குகு	16 November 2019	Star Vijay	Ongoing	7	Original	
Kannada	Cookku with Kirikku ಕಿರಿಕ್ಕು ಜೊತೆ ಕುಕ್ಕು	10 April 2021	Star Suvarna	15 August 2021	1	Remake	
Bengali	Gole Male Gol গোলে পুরুষ গোল	25 September 2021	Star Jalsha	14 November 2021	1	Remake	
Malayalam	Cook with Comedy കുക്ക് വിത്ത് കോമഡി	6 May 2023	Asianet	8 July 2023	1	Remake	
Hindi	Laughter Chefs – Unlimited Entertainment लाफ्टर शेफ्स – अनलिमिटेड एंटरटेनमेंट	1 June 2024	Colors TV	26 July 2026	3	Remake	
Marathi	Shitti Vajali Re शिट्टी वाजली रे	26 April 2025	Star Pravah	3 August 2025	1	Remake	
Telugu	Cooku with Jathirathnalu జాతిరత్నాలు తో కుకు	28 June 2025	Star Maa	Ongoing	2	Remake	
Kannada	Kwatle Kitchen ಕ್ವಾಟ್ಲೆ ಕಿಚನ್	14 June 2025	Colors Kannada	Ongoing	2	Remake	
Malayalam	Comedy Cooks കോമഡി കുക്ക്സ്	18 April 2026	Asianet	2 August 2026	1	Remake	
