= Jambada Hudugi =

2007 Indian film by Priya Hassan

- DVD cover
- Directed by: Priya Hassan
- Written by: Dialogue: Srinivas Koushik; Kumar
- Screenplay by: Priya Hassan
- Story by: Nanjundappa; Priya Hassan
- Produced by: Gowramma; Mohan Gowda
- Starring: Priya Hassan; Jai Akash; Yash
- Cinematography: A C Mahendra
- Edited by: R Janardhan
- Music by: Rajesh Ramanath
- Production company: Sri Prishmo Productions
- Release date: 15 June 2007
- Country: India
- Language: Kannada

Jambada Hudugi (transl. Proud girl) is a 2007 Kannada-language romantic drama film directed by Priya Hassan. The film stars herself, Jai Akash, along with Yash in the lead roles. The film was commercially successful and ran for a hundred days. It also marked the on-screen debut of actor Yash.

Priya Hassan won the Kannada Film Industry Directors' Association Award for Best Debut Director.

== Cast ==
- Priya Hassan as Priya
- Jai Akash as Rakesh
- Yash as Lakshmikanth
- Ramesh Bhat
- Jayanthi as Priya's mother
- Bhavya
- Girija Lokesh

== Soundtrack ==
The songs were composed by Rajesh Ramanath. The song "Life Fantasy" is partially based on "Ada Ennatha Solvenugo" from Sivakasi.

- "Bhoomi Yathe Neenu" - K. S. Chitra
- "Life Fantasy" - Chaitra H. G.
- "Nodi Nodi" - Rajesh Krishnan
- "Gaala Haki" - Hemanth Kumar, Shamita Malnad
- "Muthu Muthu" - Chetan Sosca, Shamita Malnad

== Reception ==
A critic from Chitraloka.com wrote that "Jambada Hudugi makes a pleasing viewing and Kannada fans should see and encourage a budding talent like Priya Hasan".

== Controversy ==
The film was not granted a subsidy by the Government of Karnataka. The petitions states that the film "revolves around womb cultivation and brings awareness to the public with regard to the effects of smoking, drinking, violence etc".
