= Yash (actor) =

Indian actor and film producer (born 1986)

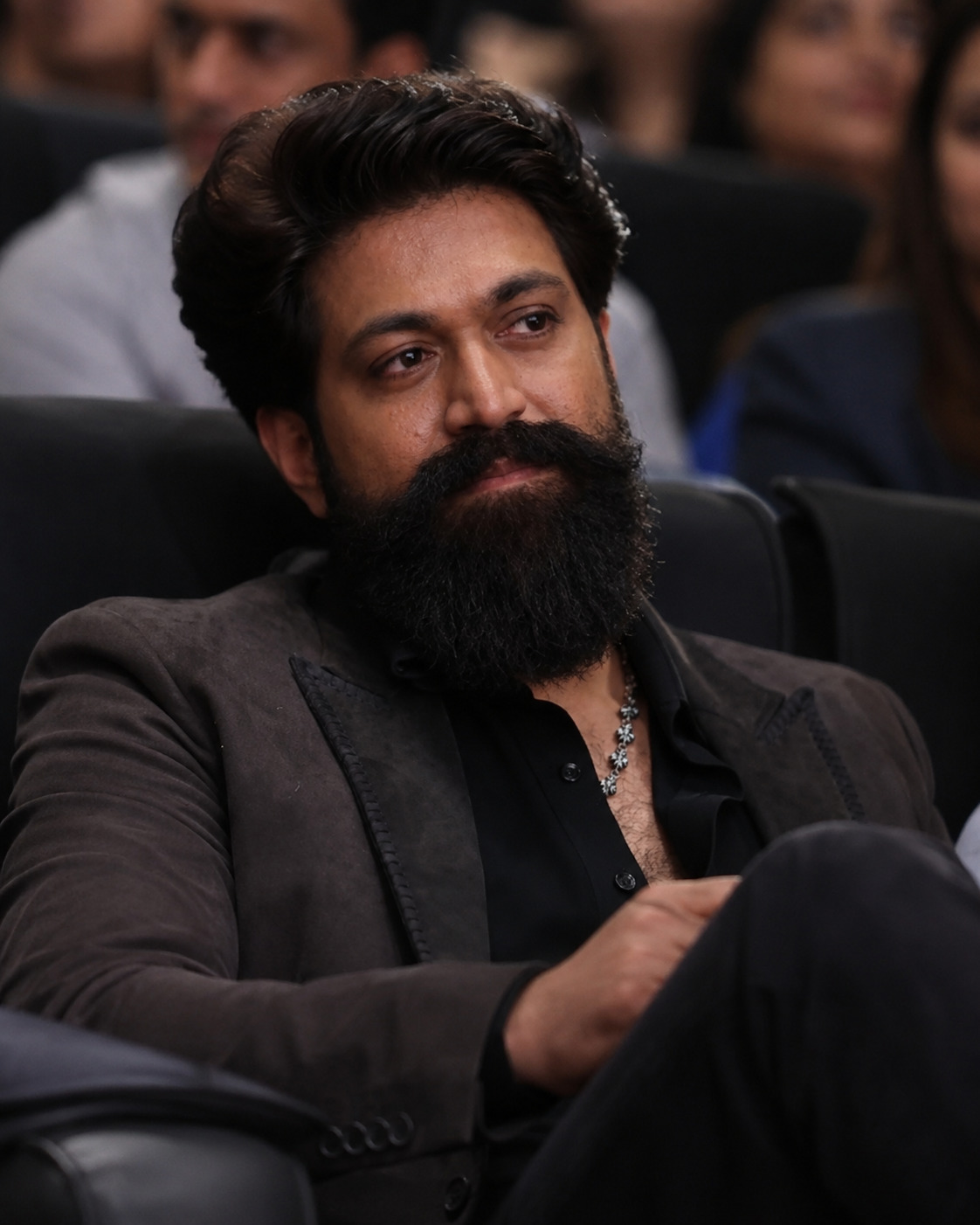
- Yash in 2026
- Born: Naveen Kumar; 8 January 1986 (age 40); Boovanahalli, Hassan, Karnataka, India
- Education: K.L.E. College
- Occupations: Actor; film producer
- Years active: 2004–present
- Spouse: Radhika Pandit (m. 2016)
- Children: 2

Yash (pronounced [/yah-sh/]; born Naveen Kumar, 8 January 1986) is an Indian actor and film producer who works in Kannada and Hindi films. Known for his work in mass hero films, he is referred to as "Rocking Star" in the media. One of the highest-paid actors of Kannada cinema, Yash is a recipient of several accolades including three Filmfare Awards South and five SIIMA Awards.

Yash began his career with appearances in several television series in the 2000s. He made his film debut in 2007 with Jambada Hudugi. The 2008 romantic drama Moggina Manasu, for which he received the Filmfare Award for Best Supporting Actor, proved to be a breakthrough role for Yash. His first film in a leading role, Rocky (2008), was poorly received by critics and a box office flop. Yash went on to establish himself as a leading actor of Kannada cinema with Googly, Raja Huli (both 2013), Gajakesari, Mr & Mrs Ramachari (both 2014), Masterpiece (2015) and Santhu Straight Forward (2016), all of which became commercial successes. The pan-India success of Prashanth Neel's KGF duology which consists of KGF: Chapter 1 (2018) and KGF: Chapter 2 (2022), helped Yash attain nationwide recognition. The former earned him the Filmfare Award for Best Actor – Kannada and the latter ranks as the highest-grossing Kannada film worldwide.

Yash is a philanthropist and promotes social causes through the Yasho Marga Foundation, a charitable foundation established by him and his wife. In addition to acting, he is a prominent celebrity endorser of several brands and products. He is married to actress Radhika Pandit, with whom he has two children.

== Early life and career ==
Yash was born in Boovanahalli, a village in Hassan, Karnataka, India. He was given two names: Naveen legally, and his mother's side of the family named him Yashwanth. (Note: The variant spelling Yeshwaant is also reported in sources.) Yashwanth was chosen as they believed his time of birth astrologically necessitated a name beginning with the letter ಯ (ya). In keeping with a Hindu tradition of giving children a deity's epithet, Yash was described as Nanjundeshwara ("poison-drinker god", referring to Shiva). Before starting his acting career, he was advised by others in the industry to adopt a stage name. Desiring to stand out with a name that was unique, he shortened Yashwanth to Yash.

Yash's father, Arun Kumar, was a driver for the Karnataka State Road Transport Corporation and later the Bangalore Metropolitan Transport Corporation. His mother, Pushpa, is a homemaker. He has a younger sister, Nandini, who is married to a computer engineer. Yash aspired to be an actor from a young age and actively participated in theatre and dance competitions at his school in Mysore. When he was young, his family also ran a provision store, where he would help out regularly. Yash wanted to quit school and pursue full-time acting after completing grade 10 but had to complete senior school at the demand of his parents. He studied at the Mahajana Education Society in Mysore for all his school years. His parents initially disapproved of his acting ambitions, and his father wanted him to be a government officer. In 2003, they relented and allowed him to move to Bangalore at the age of 16 to work on a film as an assistant director, but stated that he would not be allowed to go back if he returned. The project was cancelled after only two days of filming, but Yash stayed in Bangalore. He stated he had ₹300 (equivalent to ₹1,200 or US$13 in 2026) with him at the time. He joined a theatre group, the Benaka drama troupe, which was formed by dramatist B. V. Karanth. He worked as a backstage worker and was paid ₹50 (53¢ US) per day.

Yash eventually became a backup actor, and in 2004, portrayed Balarama, the lead role in a play. While still working in theatre, he made his television debut the same year with the teleserial Uttarayana. In 2005, he was offered a role in the teleserial Nanda Gokula, where he starred alongside Radhika Pandit. He went on to appear in several other teleserials such as T. N. Seetharam's Male Billu and Preeti Illada Mele. Once Yash had secured a stable income, his parents moved in with him to Bengaluru. During this time, he was offered roles in seven films, but his insistence on having the script for each film made available to him was viewed as "arrogance from a newcomer" and often refused.

== Career ==
=== Film debut and breakthrough (2008–2012) ===
Yash debuted in 2007 with a supporting role in Priya Hassan's Jambada Hudugi, which saw him play a man whose infertile wife seeks uterus transplantation. A critic from Indiaglitz wrote that "Yash is very good in his debut". He next played the romantic interest of his Nanda Gokula co-actor Radhika Pandit's character in the teen drama Moggina Manasu (2008), directed by Shashank, which follows the love lives of four girls who become friends in college. He was cast in a last-minute decision after Shashank's initial choice for the role fractured their leg and required rest for six months. Shashank then happened to see Yash in an episode of Preeti Illada Mele and was impressed by his performance. Yash was sporting a beard for Preeti Illada Mele but Shashank reached out to him and convinced him to shave clean for the role. R.G. Vijayasarathy of Rediff.com found the film worked despite its screenplay and highlighted Yash's performance among the male cast as impressive. The role won him the Filmfare Award for Best Supporting Actor in Kannada at the 56th Filmfare Awards South. The film is considered to be Yash's breakthrough project.

Yash then starred in the title role in the romance Rocky (2008) opposite Bianca Desai, playing a college student who has a troubled relationship with his parents. Rocky emerged to be a critical and commercial failure; Vijayasarathy, who found him promising in Jambada Hudugi and Moggina Manasu, wrote that "he looks uncomfortable here, as the role lacks clarity". In the first of his two releases in 2009, the Sumana Kittur-directed action drama Kallara Santhe, he played Somu, a post-graduate student and later auto rickshaw driver who is driven to consider suicide. To promote the film, he drove the winners of a local contest around Bangalore in an auto rickshaw, an event that attracted media attention. Writing for The New Indian Express, a critic was not impressed with the screenplay: "Though this film showcases contemporary issues such as extra-marital affairs, corruption and nepotism among politicians, the director has not succeeded in presenting them very well." The second release, Prakash's family drama Gokula, featured an ensemble cast including Vijay Raghavendra and Pooja Gandhi. A critic for The Times of India found the film to appeal only to "those who love sentimental stories celebrating the bond between mothers and sons", but appreciated the starring performances, including Yash's. Both Kallara Santhe and Gokula failed to do well commercially.

In 2010, Yash starred in the romantic comedy Modalasala, alongside Bhama. The Daily News and Analysis felt the film had "its funny moments and occasionally, an overdose of sentimental scenes" and highlighted Yash's prowess as a dancer, calling him "easily one of the best we have in Sandalwood". The film was a commercial success, becoming Yash's first solo box office hit. His next release was the crime action Rajadhani (2011), about a group of friends who commit a murder for money and go on the run from a cop played by Prakash Raj. The film failed to meet critical and commercial expectations, with Rediff.com saying that its promising messages were lost in consumerism, but found Yash to be the best performer among the cast: "He puts up a restrained performance and gets to play more than a motor-mouth lover boy." The same year, he appeared in Kirataka, a remake of the Tamil-language romantic comedy Kalavani (2010), playing a wayward student who falls in love with his batchmate, played by Oviya. Lakshminarayana was appreciative of the film and wrote, "Yash is easily Kannada industry's best brat. The film gives him scope to exhibit his dance moves and at the same time brings out his acting talent." With earnings of ₹30 million domestically, Kirataka was one of the top-grossing Kannada films of 2011.

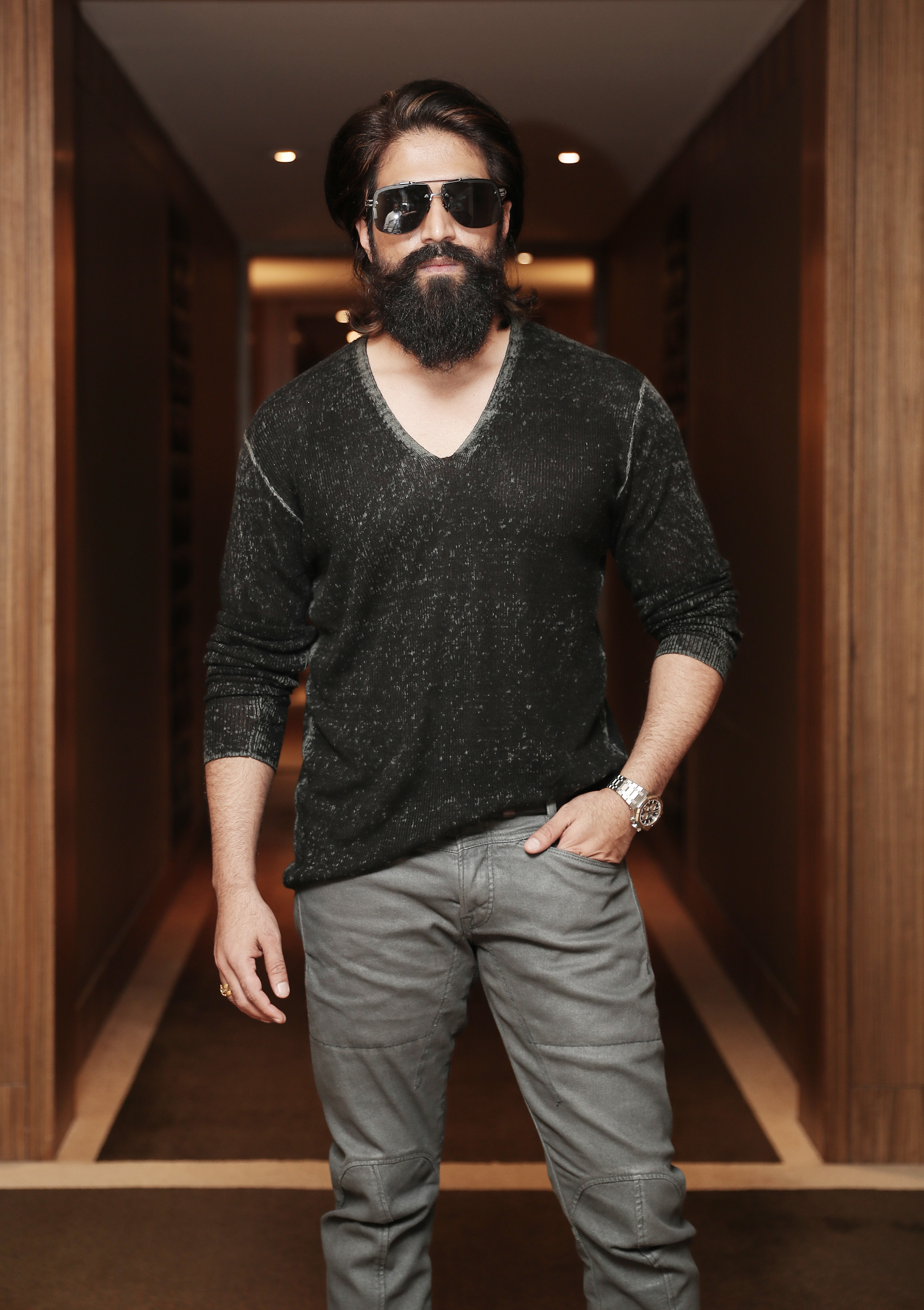
Yash at an event in Bangalore

Yash had three film releases in 2012. The romantic comedy Lucky saw him play Lucky, an aspiring commercial director who gets an unrecognisable makeover and changes his name to Vicky. Vicky tried to woo Gowri (played by Ramya), a radio jockey, but finds that she loves Lucky. Srikanth Srinivasa of Rediff.com commended the "relaxing, feel-good movie," writing, "Yash looks dashing in the second half as the well-behaved Vicky but he is also equally at ease in his earlier avatar as Lucky." In contrast, a critic for the Indo-Asian News Service felt it was dragged down by being "predictable, inconsistent and illogical" and stated Yash "scores well as a dancer," but disliked his chemistry with Ramya. The action romance Jaanu, directed by Preetham Gubbi, followed a hotel owner who must overcome familial pressure to unite with his lover. A critic for the Indo-Asian News Service stated the film was "good for a one-time watch" and appreciated the fight sequences involving Yash. Both Lucky and Jaanu were fairly successful commercially. His final release of the year was Yograj Bhat's romantic comedy Drama, starring opposite Radhika Pandit. Shruti I.L. of Daily News and Analysis found the pair to be "a cute on-screen couple" and felt they "liven[ed] up the screen with their effortless performances." It was one of the highest-grossing Kannada films of 2012.

=== Established actor (2013–2017) ===
Yash first appeared on-screen in 2013 in the Kannada-Tamil bilingual Chandra, with a cameo appearance in the song "Tasse Otthu" (Kannada)/"Raaja Raajan" (Tamil). He then starred in Googly, a college romance directed by Pavan Wadeyar, playing Sharath, a misogynist university student who dates Swathi (played by Kriti Kharbanda), but breaks up with her after being convinced that she is cheating on him. Years later, he becomes a successful businessman and encounters her. Intent on moving away from village-centric roles as in Kirataka and Drama, Yash saw Googly as a means to reinvent himself and adopted a different hairstyle for a "young and charming look". The film performed well and was one of the year's highest-grossing Kannada films. The Times of India noted that the success of Googly contributed to Yash's increasing stardom and put him on the path to becoming one of the leading stars of the industry. A critic writing for the newspaper found that Wadeyar "infused life into the story with excellent making" and granted "full marks" to Yash, highlighting his performance in the "sentimental sequences". Googly was followed by a series of hero-centric films whose primary selling point was Yash's screen presence, establishing him as a "mass hero". His final release of the year was Guru Deshpande's comedy-drama Raja Huli, a remake of the Tamil-language Sundarapandian (2012), which emerged to be a commercial success. Shyam Prasad S. of Bangalore Mirror called the film "a perfect blend of entertainment and drama" and noted, "Despite a hero-glorifying title, the film is not an action-adventure."

In 2014, he starred in Gajakesari, which was directed by Krishna and became commercially successful at the box office. A critic for Sify found it to carry "a neatly sketched story and a well-executed script with good visuals" and appreciated his performance, suggesting that "nobody could have done this better than him." His next film Mr & Mrs Ramachari opposite Radhika Pandit had its theatrical release in December 2014, and opened to positive reviews and collected an estimated ₹50 crore, and went on to become one of the highest grossing Kannada cinema. In 2015, he acted in Masterpiece, which emerged as a commercial hit at the box office. Archana Nathan of The Hindu disliked the film for its contrived parallel of the main character with Bhagat Singh and wrote of Yash, "His dialogue delivery is high-pitched and monotonous as is his acting." In 2016, he starred in Santhu Straight Forward which performed fairly well at the box office by collecting ₹30 crore.

=== KGF and wide recognition (2018–present) ===
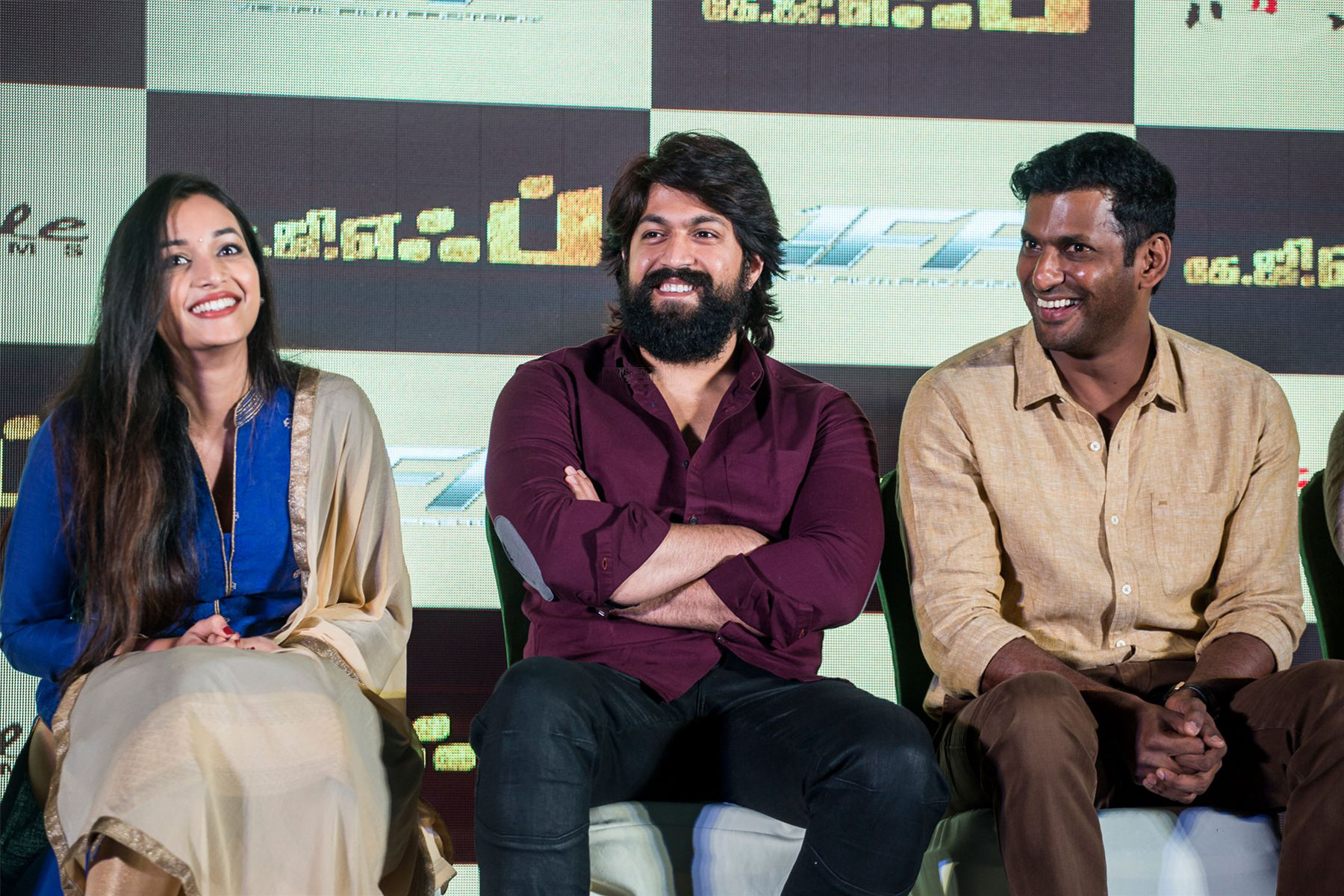
Yash, Vishal, Srinidhi Shetty at the ‘KGF’ Press Meet In Chennai

In 2018, Yash starred in the first instalment of the two-part Prashanth Neel-directed K.G.F series, KGF: Chapter 1, which was released in Kannada along with dubbed versions in Hindi, Telugu, Tamil, and Malayalam. Produced on a budget of ₹80crore, it was the most expensive Kannada film at the time and emerged as the highest-grossing Kannada film during its theatrical run. Yash grew out his beard for the role. KGF: Chapter 1 emerged to be a pan-Indian film, earning him nationwide recognition. The sequel, KGF: Chapter 2 (2022), which also starred Sanjay Dutt and Raveena Tandon, became the fourth highest-grossing Indian film ever with earnings over ₹10 billion. His performance in the series as Rocky, an assassin and gold kingpin who takes over the Kolar Gold Fields, received praise. A critic writing for the Hindustan Times opined he was "just unmissable." Sukanya Verma of Rediff.com was critical of the film but felt that Yash's "sly humour and unbridled ferocity hits all the right notes."

Following the success of the K.G.F films, Yash returned to the big screen in 2026, four years after the release of the blockbuster KGF: Chapter 2, with Geetu Mohandas' period gangster film Toxic: A Fairy Tale for Grown-Ups. The film featured an assemble cast of including Nayanthara, Kiara Advani, Huma Qureshi, Tara Sutaria and Rukmini Vasanth. Despite a strong opening at the box office, Toxic experienced a sharp decline in collections after its opening days and emerged as a major commercial failure. Trade reports estimated its worldwide theatrical gross at around ₹340 crore, substantially below its reported production cost of ₹500-1,000 crore.

Yash will next be seen in the upcoming Indian mythological epic Ramayana: Part 1, directed by Nitesh Tiwari, in which he portrays the antagonist Ravana, marking his Hindi film debut. The film stars Ranbir Kapoor as Lord Ram, Sai Pallavi as Sita and Ravi Dubey as Lakshman, with Sunny Deol portraying Hanuman. Ramayana: Part 1 is scheduled for theatrical release on 5 November 2026 in IMAX and standard formats, with the second instalment scheduled for release in 2028.

== Personal life ==
Yash met actress Radhika Pandit on the sets of Nanda Gokula in 2007. They became close friends after working together in films and eventually began dating, but kept their relationship private for years. Media speculation regarding the nature of their relationship intensified after Mr & Mrs Ramachari, their third film working together. They were engaged in Goa on 12 August 2016 at a private event with close friends and family. Yash married Pandit on 9 December 2016 in Bangalore in a ceremony that saw celebrities and politicians from Karnataka attending. Two separate wedding receptions were organised: one for friends and family, and another for fans at Bengaluru Palace. They have two children.

== Philanthropy and other work ==
In 2017, Yash, along with Radhika Pandit, founded the YashoMarga Foundation, a social welfare non-profit organisation. In their first mission, the foundation addressed a water crisis in Karnataka's Koppal district by investing ₹40 million towards desilting lakes and providing pure drinking water to 40 villages in the region. That year, he sought protection from the police owing to death threats.

Yash has campaigned for S. R. Mahesh of Janata Dal (Secular) in Krishnarajanagara and S. A. Ramdas of Bharatiya Janata Party in Krishnaraja constituency in the 2018 Karnataka Legislative Assembly elections. In 2019, he endorsed independent candidate Sumalatha, wife of Ambareesh, in Mandya constituency. He has stated that he is open to entering politics if the situation arises. Yash has collaborated with the Bangalore Police for a campaign against drunk driving in 2019, in the days leading up to New Year's Day. 50 days before his 34th birthday, his fans organised an environmental campaign to plant trees and save water. In 2021, he donated ₹5000 each to 3000 workers in the Kannada film fraternity to ease their financial burden after the COVID-19 pandemic.

== In the media ==
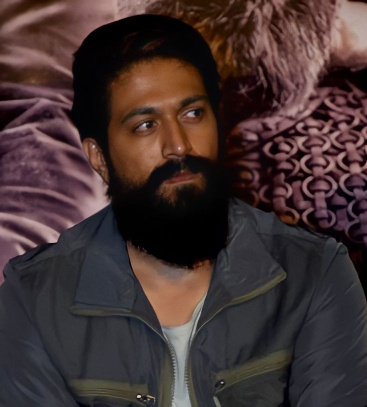
Yash in 2022

After the release of Moggina Manasu in 2009, Yash was considered a "wonder boy" in the media for his appearance, mannerisms, and "ability to dance to any tune". Later films would see him play characters falling into the "mass hero" trope. He is sometimes credited as "Rocking Star Yash", a name that originated among his fans for his image of "a rugged idol who follows no rules but his own". Another news outlet attributed the nickname to the "rocking" back-to-back commercial success of his films.

Yash is cited in the media among the few South Indian actors with an audience in North India. He stated that while his success in the Kannada industry felt gradual over the years, the later nationwide recognition was an "overnight" phenomenon. Writing for India Today in 2022, Janani K. called him the "poster boy of Kannada cinema" for being the most recognisable person working in that industry across India. In 2019, he became the first Kannada actor to be featured on the cover of Forbes India. Forbes India further ranked him third on their list of most influential celebrities on Instagram from South India in October 2021. Yash debuted on The Times of India's Bangalore Times Most Desirable Men list in 2012 at 11th place. He has since appeared on the list several times, and was ranked first in 2013, 2017 and 2020. In 2019, he was included by GQ India in their list of 50 most influential young Indians.

Yash has been described as the highest-paid actor in the Kannada film Industry, and one of the highest in South Indian cinema in general. In addition to being an active celebrity endorser for several brands, he partnered with Marico's grooming brand Beardo in 2020 to create a lifestyle label "Villain", which includes perfumes and clothing. He and his wife are joint ambassadors for Freedom Refined Sunflower Oil. Yash is a representative for Bengaluru Bulls in the Pro Kabaddi League. Yash is also one of the highest grossing actors of Indian cinema.

== Filmography ==
=== Films ===
Key
†	Denotes films that have not yet been released

- All films are in Kannada unless otherwise indicated

Year	Title	Role(s)	Notes	Ref.
2007	Jambada Hudugi	Lakshmikanth		
2008	Moggina Manasu	Rahul		
2008	Rocky	Rocky		
2009	Kallara Santhe	Somu		
2009	Gokula	N. Raja		
2010	Thamassu	Imran	Cameo appearance	
2010	Modalasala	Karthik		
2011	Rajadhani	Raja		
2011	Kirataka	Nandisha		
2012	Lucky	Vikram "Vicky" Kumar "Lucky"		
2012	Jaanu	Siddharth		
2012	Drama	T. K. Venkatesha		
2013	Chandra	Dancer	Simultaneously filmed in Tamil; Special appearance in the song "Tasse Otthu"/"Raaja Raajan"	
2013	Googly	Sharath		
2013	Raja Huli	Raja Huli		
2014	Gajakesari	Krishna & Bahubali (Note: Yash played double role films.)	Dual role	
2014	Mr & Mrs Ramachari	Ramachari		
2015	Masterpiece	Yuva & Bhagat Singh	Dual role	
2016	Santhu Straight Forward	Santhu		
2018	KGF: Chapter 1	Raja Krishnappa Bairya "Rocky"		
2022	KGF: Chapter 2	Raja Krishnappa Bairya "Rocky"		
2026	Toxic	Raya / Ticket (Note: Yash played a single character with split personality)	Dual role to Split personality; Simultaneously filmed in English; also co-writer and producer	
2026	Ramayana: Part 1	Ravana	Hindi film; also co-producer; voice dubbed by Sharad Kelkar	
2028	Ramayana: Part 2 †	Ravana	Hindi film; also co-producer; voice dubbed by Sharad Kelkar	

=== Television ===
List of Yash television credits
Year	Title	Role	Network	Ref.
2004	Silli Lalli	Raju Hongesoppu	ETV Kannada	
2005	Nanda Gokula	Unknown	ETV Kannada	
2006	Preeti Illada Mele	Unknown	ETV Kannada	
2007	Male Billu	Arjun	ETV Kannada	
2007	Shiva	Aditya	DD Chandana	

== Discography ==
Year	Track	Album	Ref.
2014	"Annthamma"	Mr & Mrs Ramachari	
2015	"Annange Love" (with Chikkanna)	Masterpiece	

== Accolades ==
Yash is a recipient of three Filmfare Awards South from eight nominations — Best Supporting Actor – Kannada for Moggina Manasu, and Best Actor – Kannada for Mr & Mrs Ramachari and KGF: Chapter 1.

Year (Note: Refers to the year in which the award ceremony was held.)	Award	Category	Work	Result	Ref.
2009	Filmfare Awards South	Best Supporting Actor – Kannada	Moggina Manasu	Won	
2013	Filmfare Awards South	Best Actor – Kannada	Drama	Nominated	
2014	Filmfare Awards South	Best Actor – Kannada	Googly	Nominated	
2014	South Indian International Movie Awards	Best Actor – Kannada	Googly	Nominated	
2015	Filmfare Awards South	Best Actor – Kannada	Mr & Mrs Ramachari	Won	
2015	Filmfare Awards South	Best Male Playback Singer – Kannada (Note: For the song "Annthamma")	Mr & Mrs Ramachari	Nominated	
2015	South Indian International Movie Awards	Best Actor – Kannada	Mr & Mrs Ramachari	Won	
2016	IIFA Utsavam	Best Actor – Kannada	Mr & Mrs Ramachari	Won	
2016	Filmfare Awards South	Best Actor – Kannada	Masterpiece	Nominated	
2016	South Indian International Movie Awards	Best Actor – Kannada	Masterpiece	Nominated	
2016	Zee Kannada Dashakada Sambhrama	Hero of the Decade	—N/a	Won	
2017	IIFA Utsavam	Best Actor – Kannada	Masterpiece	Nominated	
2017	IIFA Utsavam	Best Male Playback Singer – Kannada	Masterpiece	Nominated	
2017	South Indian International Movie Awards	Best Actor – Kannada	Santhu Straight Forward	Nominated	
2019	Filmfare Awards South	Best Actor – Kannada	KGF: Chapter 1	Won	
2019	South Indian International Movie Awards	Best Actor – Kannada	KGF: Chapter 1	Won	
2019	South Indian International Movie Awards	Best Actor Critics – Kannada	KGF: Chapter 1	Won	
2019	South Indian International Movie Awards	Style Icon of The Year	—N/a	Won	
2022	Filmfare Awards South	Best Actor – Kannada	KGF: Chapter 2	Nominated	
2022	South Indian International Movie Awards	Best Actor – Kannada	KGF: Chapter 2	Won	
