= Silli Lalli =

- Season 2 poster
- Genre: Sitcom
- Written by: Vijaya Prasad
- Directed by: Sihi Kahi Chandru
- Starring: Ravishankar Gowda; Manju Bhashini; Roopa Prabhakar
- Country of origin: India
- Original language: Kannada

Production
- Producer: Sihi Kahi Chandru
- Running time: Approx. 21 minutes
- Production company: Final Cut Productions

Original release
- Network: ETV Kannada
- Release: 2003 – 2007

Silli Lalli is an Indian Kannada sitcom aired on ETV Kannada on the year 2003. It was produced and directed by actor Sihi Kahi Chandru and written by Vijaya Prasad. The series starred Ravishankar Gowda, Manju Bhashini, and Roopa Prabhakar in lead roles. The series became hugely popular and attained cult status in Kannada television. It has aired more than 1,100 episodes in 4 years.

== Plot ==
The series is about Vittal Rao, a doctor, and his family's day-to-day lives. Often one or more of the family members encounters trouble and the family works together to solve it.

== Cast ==
Season 1

- Ravishankar Gowda as Dr Vittal Rao
- Manju Bhashini as Samaja Sevaki "Lalli" Lalitamba
- Roopa Prabhakar as Kathalekaki "Silli" Sreelalitha
- Jyothi Kiran as Suji
- Sangamesh Upase as Govinda
- Prashant as Prahalad "Palli"
- Shrinivasa Gowda as Ranganath
- Sunetra Pandit as Vishalu
- Namitha Rao as Lalitha "Nurse Maid Lalitha"
- Mithra as Janesha
- Anand as Narahari
- Vijayalakshmi Subramani as Lalitha "Servant Maid Lalitha"
- Yash as Raju Hongesoppu
- Mohan Shankar (cameo in title song)

Season 2

- Prabhu Raj as Dr Vittal Rao
- Vilas Rao as Prahalad "Palli"

== Production ==
The series marked Ravishankar Gowda's tryst with comedy after previously being known as a serious actor. Although he was not confident about his comedic skills, the writer Vijay Prasad reassured him that he was confident in his comedic timing.

== Music ==
Title song was composed and penned by V. Manohar.

Silli Lalli (Original Soundtrack)
No.	Title	Length
1.	"Silli Lalli"	0:05

== Reception ==
The series started airing from 7 April 2003 at 9 PM. As of December 2004, the series completed 400 episodes. As of March 2005, the series completed 500 episodes. As of July 2005, the series completed 600 episodes. At the end of its air, the series completed over 1,162 episodes. The dialogue "I am Dr. Vittal Rao... very famous in surgery and bargery" became popular. Suji's dialogue "Am I right?" was also popular.

== Sequel ==
The series spawned a sequel with entirely different cast but with same characters. It was aired on Colors Super on the year 2019. The second season was aired at 9pm before the air time was changed to 10 am.
