= Chandan Kumar =

Indian actor

- Born: 11 September 1985 (age 40). Mysore
- Occupation: Actor
- Years active: 2010–present
- Spouse: Kavitha Gowda (m. 2021)

Chandan Kumar, mononymously known as Chandan, is an Indian actor who works in Kannada films and Kannada and Telugu television. He is known for his work in the television soap opera Radha Kalyana and later Lakshmi Baramma, in which he played the role of Chandu, that was aired on Colors Kannada from 2012.

During the time, he was cast in several films for which he had to step out of the serials mid-way. His first film in lead role Parinaya released in 2014 which took two years in the production. He was one of the leads in the multi-starrer film, Luv U Alia (2015) and protagonist in bilingual film Prema Baraha.

Apart from serials and films, Chandan has been contestant for the reality shows such as Pyate Mandi Kadige Bandru, "Dancing Stars season 1" and runner-up in Bigg Boss Kannada 3.

== Personal life ==
Chandan married his co-star Kavitha Gowda on 14 May 2021 in Bengaluru.

== Filmography ==
=== Films ===
Year	Film	Role	Notes
2011	Lifeu Ishtene	Chandan	Supporting role
2014	Parinaya	Pretham	Debut in lead
2015	Katte	Chandu	
2015	Eradondla Mooru	Prem	
2015	Luv U Alia	Kiran	
2015	Bangalore 560023	Chandu	
2018	Prema Baraha	Sanjay	Simultaneously shot in Tamil as Sollividava
2021	SriKrishna@gmail.com	Himself	Cameo appearance
2024	Gowri		Cameo appearance
2025	Flirt	Krishna	Also director, writer, and producer

=== Television ===
Year	Title	Role	Channel	Language	Notes
2011	Pyate Mandi Kadige Bandru	Contestant	Suvarna	Kannada	
2011–2013	Radha Kalyana	Vishal Bharadwaj	Zee Kannada	Kannada	
2013–2014	Lakshmi Baramma	Chandu	Colors Kannada	Kannada	
2013	Taka Dhimi Tha Dancing Star	Contestant	Colors Kannada	Kannada	
2015	Bigg Boss Kannada 3	Contestant	Colors Kannada	Kannada	Runner up
2018–2020	Sarvamangala Mangalye	Maha Shankara	Star Suvarna	Kannada	
2019–2021	Savitramma Gari Abbayi	Balraju	Star Maa	Telugu	Replaced by Baladitya
2021	Cookku with Kirikku	Contestant	Star Suvarna	Kannada	Winner
2021–2023	Marali Mansagide	SP Vikrant Nayak	Star Suvarna	Kannada	
2021–2022	Srimathi Srinivas	Srinivas	Star Maa	Telugu	Replaced by Ashwin
