= Sanju Weds Geetha 2 =

Indian romantic drama film

- Theatrical release poster
- Directed by: Nagashekar
- Written by: Nagashekar
- Produced by: Chalavadi Kumar
- Starring: Srinagara Kitty; Rachita Ram; Chetan Chandra; Ragini Dwivedi
- Cinematography: Satya Hegde
- Edited by: Anthony
- Music by: Sridhar V. Sambhram
- Production companies: Pavithra International Movie Makers; Mahaanadi Creations
- Release date: 17 January 2025
- Country: India
- Language: Kannada

Sanju Weds Geetha 2 is a 2025 Indian Kannada-language romantic drama film directed and written by Nagashekar. Although the title is derived from Nagashekar's 2011 film, Sanju Weds Geetha, the film is said to be not a sequel as there is no connection between the two story plots. The film stars Srinagara Kitty and Rachita Ram in lead roles, with Chetan Chandra and Ragini Dwivedi making special appearances. Produced by Chalavadi Kumar, the film's music is composed by Sridhar V. Sambhram and the cinematography is by Satya Hegde.

Shot extensively in Europe, particularly in Switzerland and the Netherlands, the film highlights the lives and struggles of local silk farmers in securing a better price for their yarn.

Sanju Weds Geetha 2 released in theaters on 17 January 2025. The film received negative reviews from critics and audiences.

== Plot ==
The film opens with Geetha (Rachita Ram) eagerly preparing to celebrate her 10th wedding anniversary with her husband Sanju (Srinagara Kitty). Sanju, now a successful textile entrepreneur, is in Hyderabad attending a high-profile business conclave. To surprise Geetha, he arranges a helicopter ride for her to join him, setting the stage for what seems like a perfect celebration. However, fate has other plans, and a sudden twist during her arrival alters the course of their lives forever.

The narrative then flashes back to their first meeting years earlier. Sanju, a humble handloom saree salesman, encounters Geetha on her way to participate in the Miss Karnataka finale. He gifts her a saree that beautifully depicts Karnataka’s cultural heritage, helping her win the coveted title. Geetha, the only daughter of a wealthy silk business tycoon (Sampath Raj), falls in love with Sanju at first sight. Despite her father’s strong opposition, Geetha confesses her love, and Sanju reciprocates with a heartfelt promise to care for her “till his last breath.”

Defying family pressure, the couple marries and dreams of building their own textile empire. Their journey from modest beginnings to becoming leading entrepreneurs unfolds against picturesque backdrops, including Switzerland, where the second half of the film is set. Just as they seem to have achieved everything—love, success, and stability—the story pivots back to the present, where an unexpected tragedy during their anniversary celebrations tests the strength of their bond and the depth of their promises.

== Cast ==
- Srinagara Kitty as Sanju
- Rachita Ram as Geetha
- Rangayana Raghu
- Sadhu Kokila
- Sampath Raj
- Tabla Nani
- Chetan Chandra in a special appearance
- Ragini Dwivedi in a special appearance

== Production ==
The earliest news about a sequel to Sanju Weds Geetha was published in early 2015, with few articles confirming the inclusion of actress Kriti Kharbanda to play the role of a blind girl. However she denied being a part of this film. Later, the sequel plan was shelved for many years. In 2023, Nagashekar took up the title yet again and signed in Srinagara Kitty to reprise his role of Sanju. However, talks were on with Ramya to reprise her character of Geetha. In July 2023, Rachita Ram was confirmed to play the role of Geetha. The film went on floors from 15 August 2023 with Nagashekar planning to rope in actress Tamannaah for a special song and also to cast Prakash Raj and Ramya Krishnan to play pivotal roles. However, later Ragini Dwivedi was confirmed to appear in the special song and also Chetan Chandra would play a role.

== Soundtrack ==
The soundtrack consists of songs composed by Sridhar V. Sambhram to the lyrics by Kaviraj. The audio rights were acquired by Anand Audio.

Track listing
No.	Title	Lyrics	Singer(s)	Length
1.	"Habibi"	Kaviraj	Jassie Gift, Mangli	4:45
2.	"Avanu Sanju Avalu Geetha"	Kaviraj	Sonu Nigam, Sangeetha Ravindranath	5:36
3.	"Maleyanthe Baa"	Kaviraj	Sangeetha Ravindranath	4:10
4.	"Nadi Nadi Endu"	Kaviraj	Sonu Nigam, Sangeetha Ravindranath	4:53
5.	"Maleyanthe Nee Baa"	Kaviraj	Sangeetha Ravindranath	4:10
6.	"Nadi Nadi Endu"	Kaviraj	Abhishek M. R., Sangeetha Ravindranath	2:52
7.	"Sanju Weds Geetha 2 Theme Music"		Shreya Ghoshal, Abhishek M. R., Sangeetha Ravindranath	1:22
Total length:				19:20

== Release ==
The initial plan to release the film was on 1 April 2024. Several schedule delays pushed the release dates many times in 2024 and finally the date was coined as 10 January 2025. The film's release was halted by Telugu film producer Chintapalli Ramarao who brought a stay after accusing Nagashekar for not repaying the loan as per agreement they both made during the director's previous release Gurthunda Seethakalam. The stay was vacated at the legal court and finally the film release was announced to be on 17 January 2025.

== Reception ==
=== Critical response ===
A Sharadhaa of The New Indian Express gave 2.5/5 stars and wrote "Sanju Weds Geetha 2 is an ambitious attempt to revisit a beloved emotional landscape but ultimately stumbles under the weight of its own aspirations. While the first film was a masterclass in emotional storytelling, this instalment feels like a disjointed mosaic—forced symbolism, lacklustre performances, and missed opportunities". Maheshwara Reddy of Bangalore Mirror also gave 2.5/5 stars and called out the film as "A visual treat without much depth".

Sridevi S of The Times of India gave 2.5/5 stars and was critical about the lead pair chemistry. She wrote "Besides the nostalgia around the title, the movie fails to connect emotionally with the audience. While the love story was the heart and soul of Sanju Weds Geetha, the 2025 film fails to establish the bond between the couple".
