= Myna (film) =

- Film poster
- Directed by: Nagashekar
- Screenplay by: Nagashekar
- Story by: K.V.Raju, Nagashekar
- Produced by: N. S. Rajkumar
- Starring: Chetan Kumar; Nithya Menen; R. Sarathkumar
- Cinematography: Satya Hegde
- Edited by: Jony Harsha
- Music by: Jassie Gift
- Production company: Vajreshwari Combines
- Release date: 22 February 2013
- Country: India
- Language: Kannada
- Box office: ₹7 crores

Myna is a 2013 Indian Kannada language romance drama film written and directed by Nagashekar. Based on a real-life incident, the film was produced by N. S. Rajkumar for Vajreshwari Combines. Chetan Kumar and Nithya Menen (as the title character) played the lead roles. Jassie Gift is the music director for the film. The film won Filmfare Award for Best Film – Kannada. The film is currently being remade in Hindi.

== Plot ==
The film begins with Satya being chased by the police. He is caught and is charged with a 34 serial murder case. While being transported to Bangalore on criminal charges, he shares his story with ACP B. B. Ashok Kumar, the officer who is leading the team that arrested him. How Satya met Mynaa is revealed in a flashback sequences.

Satya was one of the contenders of a reality game show played near Dudhsagar Falls. In one of the tasks, he is to collect as much money as possible incognito. He chooses to beg as a disabled person using a trolley to push himself. On the train he spots a girl named Mynaa and is instantly infatuated by her. She gives him a ₹100 (US$1.00) note and asks him to use it wisely. He would have won the challenge in the reality show had he surrendered the note. He refuses and as a consequence, has to quit the show. Satya is not disappointed by the turn of events and he considers using his time to pursue Mynaa. He pretends to be a disabled person every single day, but instead of begging he begins selling newspapers in the train that Mynaa frequents. This immensely pleases Mynaa. She starts falling in love with Satya. Slowly, they start conversing more. One day, they decide on meeting for a lengthy conversation. In this encounter, Mynaa confesses her feelings for Satya, and she is about to tell him the biggest secret of her life. Suddenly, her bag gets stolen. Satya, abandoning his pretense, catches the thieves responsible and retrieves the bag to Mynaa. She confesses that she is disabled and admits that she thought that Satya was also like her and was the reason why she liked him and considered him the perfect match for her. She expresses her discontent for Satya's lies, but she turns back and asks him if he still likes her. Satya responds that he will always like her, no matter what and will love her forever. Satya also reveals that he knew about her inability to walk. They then resolve their problems, decide to trust each other. They get married and run away from Castle Rock to Bangalore.

Once in Bangalore, they move into a house and Satya finds a job as a cab driver and Mynaa as a voice support engineer at a small software company; they live the happiest moments of their lives in this period of time in a small house. Mynaa gets recommended by her boss to join a bigger software company. Everything is going well for them, Satya says his dream in life is to see Mynaa chase him around standing on her own feet. He tells her of Dr.Anirudh Desai, who is confident of getting her operated and make her stand again. On Satya's insistence, Mynaa visits Dr.Anirudh Desai, who recommends a full body scan, who reluctantly obliges to this. Anirudh, in a breach of ethics, makes a nude video of her when she is drugged. He threatens her later to submit to his mercy. Mynaa tries to hide this fact from Satya, who finds out the truth when he takes her phone to a repair store. Satya invites the doctor home without the knowledge of Mynaa and politely asks the Anirudh to hand over the video and not publicize the video. Anirudh refuses and insists on having his way, This enrages Satya and manhandles him but Anirudh continues to incite him and Satya breaks down and kills Anirudh. He disposes the dead body by cleverly making it look like a car accident. Satya convinces Mynaa to leave for Chennai at once stating he has had a transfer to which she agrees. They meet a different doctor, who has a good track record of curing polio patients. Mynaa agrees to get the operation done. Satya goes to the bank to draw money, but he gets a call from an old friend of Mynaa, Revathi, who asks him to meet her at the beach.

This turns out to be a trap set by the police and Satya ends up being in custody of ACP Kumar, to whom he has been narrating the story. Upon hearing the story, Ashok sympathizes with Satya. It is revealed that there have been many false allegations on Satya, who has only committed one murder. Ashok convinces his brother, who is a criminal lawyer, to save Satya from the false 34 serial murder case. Ashok leaves Satya out of custody as an expression of his faith in Satya, who is provided shelter by Ashok's friend. Ashok and his friend both come under lot of pressure from their superiors and the government to produce former to court. They are also negatively projected by the media. Satya on overhearing a conversation between Ashok had his friend, learns that they have succumbed to the pressure from the government and that they intend to have him jailed. Satya quietly escapes and witnesses his wife being taken to a hostel by the police, hidden. He calls his old friend form Castle Rock (Dudhsagar) and requests him to bring Mynaa to Kengeri railway station, who agrees. Against this dramatic facade, people who are planning to kill Satya have also gathered. Ashok brings his sharp team of police officers to the station. They grab the gang trying to kill Satya. But, as a safety measure Ashok has stationed police with pointed guns on Satya. Satya meets Mynaa and lifts her in his arms and carries her; the train passes and Ashok's view of Satya is obscured.

Satya starts to run away with Mynaa. Ashok who knows the police might shoot Satya orders them Don't shoot, but the train sound flushes the Don't from his command. The constables shoot down Satya, also killing Mynaa in cross fire. The couple both die holding each other in their arms.

== Cast ==
- Chetan Kumar as Sathyamurthy
- Nithya Menen as Mynaa
- R. Sarath Kumar as ACP B. B. Ashok Kumar
- Suman Ranganath as Geetha
- Sumithra as Mynaa's mother
- Malavika Avinash as Revathi
- Tabla Nani as Forest Guard
- Raju Talikote as Diganth Doddamani
- Sunetra Pandit as Doddamani's wife
- Ajay as Anirudh Desai
- Arun Sagar as Sanjay Desai
- Jai Jagadish as Police commissioner Avinash Pande
- Sadhu Kokila as beggar in train
- Bullet Prakash as ticket collector
- Bank Suresh as police constable
- Yathiraj as Traffic police inspector
- Loknath in a cameo appearance
- Venkat Rao in a cameo appearance
- Umesh in a cameo appearance
- Bangalore Nagesh in a cameo appearance
- Akul Balaji (cameo appearance) as game show host
- R. G. Vijayasarathy in a cameo appearance
- Nagathihalli Chandrashekhar in a cameo appearance
- Suhasini Maniratnam in a cameo appearance
- Anant Nag in a cameo appearance
- Dileep
- P. Ravishankar
- Ravi Varma
- Uday Mehta
- Gowrish Akki as newsreader

== Production ==
Myna is based on a real-life incident. Ex-cop BB Ashok Kumar, the man who had detected more than 100 murder cases, narrated a murder mystery to the director that became the subject of the story. The cameraman Kashi, editor Johny Harsha, and music director Jassie Gift of Sanju Weds Geetha were retained in the team by director Nagashekhar.

The shooting of this movie was done across the Konkan stretch of Karnataka including the astounding locales of Dudhsagar waterfalls on the borders of Karnataka & Goa. The locations include the coastline of Uttara Kannada.

== Soundtrack ==
Mynaa

Soundtrack album by Jassie Gift
- Released: 14 December 2012
- Genre: Feature film soundtrack
- Label: Anand Audio

Jassie Gift composed all the songs while Kaviraj and V. Nagendra Prasad wrote the lyrics.

No.	Title	Lyrics	Singer(s)	Length
1.	"Baa Illi Beesu"	Kaviraj	Sonu Nigam, Santhosh
2.	"Modala Maleyante (Male)"	Kaviraj	Sonu Nigam
3.	"Modala Maleyante (Female)"	Kaviraj	Nithya Menen
4.	"Modala Maleyante (Duet)"	Kaviraj	Sonu Nigam, Shreya Ghoshal
5.	"Mynaa Mynaa"	Kaviraj	Sonu Nigam
6.	"O Premada Poojari"	Geethapriya	Nithya Menen, Shreya Ghoshal
7.	"Kaanada Kadalige"	G. S. Shivarudrappa	C. Aswath

== Reception ==
=== Critical response ===
A critic from The Times of India scored the film at 4 out of 5 stars and says "Nithya Menen as the girl next door brings cheers and tears with her amazing performance as a physically challenged girl with an innocent smile. Full marks to Chethan for his expression, body language and dialogue delivery. Jassie Gift has some catchy numbers for you. But it’s cinematographer Sathya Hegde who walks away with all honours". Y Maheswara Reddy of DNA scored the film at 4 out of 5 stars and says "Myna is a love story. But it isn’t a boy-meets-girl kind of tale. It has its bittersweet moments laced with enough action. An interesting story line, backed by decent screenplay, Myna is definitely a good watch". Srikanta Srinivasa of Rediff.com scored the film at 3 out of 5 stars and wrote "Mynaa is worth a watch for those who are in love and who believe in giving unconditional love to their partner".

== Box office ==
It was in 22 centers for 50 days, collected around ₹7 crores at the box-office and was in some theaters across Karnataka for 100 days.

== Awards ==
List of Accolades
Award / Film Festival	Category	Recipient(s)	Result
Karnataka State Film Awards	Best Dialogue	Nagashekar	Won
Filmfare Awards South	Best Film – Kannada	N. S. Rajkumar	Won
Filmfare Awards South	Best Director – Kannada	Nagashekar	Nominated
Filmfare Awards South	Best Actress - Kannada	Nithya Menen	Nominated
Filmfare Awards South	Best Music Director – Kannada	Jassie Gift	Nominated
Filmfare Awards South	Best Lyricist – Kannada	Kaviraj	Nominated
Filmfare Awards South	Best Female Playback Singer – Kannada	Shreya Ghoshal	Nominated
South Indian International Movie Awards	Best Film (Kannada)	N. S. Rajkumar	Won
South Indian International Movie Awards	Best Cinematographer (Kannada)	Satya Hegde	Nominated
South Indian International Movie Awards	Best Music Director (Kannada)	Jassie Gift	Nominated
South Indian International Movie Awards	Best Lyricist (Kannada)	Kaviraj	Nominated
Mirchi Music Awards South	Album of the Year	Jassie Gift	Won
Mirchi Music Awards South	Music Composer of the Year	Jassie Gift	Won
Mirchi Music Awards South	Female Vocalist of the Year	Shreya Ghoshal	Won
Mirchi Music Awards South	Upcoming Female Vocalist of the Year	Nithya Menen	Won
Mirchi Music Awards South	Lyricist of the Year	Kaviraj	Won
ETV Sangeet Samman Awards	Best Upcoming Male Playback Singer	Santhosh	Won
ETV Sangeet Samman Awards	Best Upcoming Female Playback Singer	Nithya Menen	Won
ETV Sangeet Samman Awards	Best Music Composer	Jassie Gift	Won
