= SriKrishna@gmail.com =

2021 Indian Kannada romantic film

- Release poster
- Directed by: Nagashekar
- Written by: Salam Bappu
- Story by: Preetham Gubbi
- Produced by: Sandhesh.N; Brunda Jayaram
- Starring: Darling Krishna; Bhavana
- Cinematography: Satya Hegde
- Edited by: Deepu S Kumar
- Music by: Arjun Janya
- Production company: Sandesh Productions
- Distributed by: KRG Studios
- Release date: October 15, 2021
- Running time: 105 minutes
- Country: India
- Language: Kannada

SriKrishna@gmail.com is a 2021 Indian Kannada romantic film written and directed by Nagashekar. The film was produced by Sandesh.N and co-produced by Brunda Jayaram under the banner Sandesh Productions. It features Darling Krishna and Bhavana in the lead roles. The supporting cast includes H. G. Dattatreya, Sadhu Kokila and Achyuth Kumar. The score and soundtrack for the film is by Arjun Janya and the cinematography is by Satya Hegde. The film received mixed to negative reviews from critics.

== Cast ==
- Darling Krishna as Sathya
- Bhavana as Malavika
- Dattanna
- Achyuth Kumar
- Sadhu Kokila
- Rishab Shetty (Cameo Appearance)
- Chandan Kumar (Cameo Appearance)

== Production ==
The film was announced with the muhurta on June 18 at a temple. Filming started in September 2020 in Bangalore. Later shooting took place in Mysuru and Jog falls. Actress Radhika Kumarswamy was initially approached for the female lead character, but she declined. Later the role went to actress Bhavana who agreed to be a part of the film. Actor Chandan Kumar was approached to play an extended cameo role in the film. Rishab Shetty was approached to play a pivotal cameo role in the film. The film was wrapped in July 2021. The trailer of the film was released on 2 October 2021.

== Release ==
The film was initially slated to hit the theaters on 14 October 2021 but owing to two other big releases, Salaga and Kotigobba 3, it was pushed a day ahead and was released on 15 October 2021.

== Soundtrack ==
Srikrishna@gmail.com

Soundtrack album by Arjun Janya
- Genre: Feature film soundtrack
- Language: Kannada
- Label: Anand Audio
- Producer: Sandesh N

The film's background score and the soundtracks are composed by Arjun Janya. The music rights were acquired by Anand Audio.

All lyrics are written by Kaviraj.

Tracklist
No.	Title	Lyrics	Singer(s)	Length
1.	"Kudi Notada"	Kaviraj	Sanjith Hegde	4:22
2.	"Namgella Yar Beelthare"	Kaviraj	Naveen Sajju	3:49
3.	"Bhetiyaade Yaake Nanna"	Kaviraj	Sonu Nigam, Saindhavi	5:12
4.	"Nee Jeevaku"	Kaviraj	Anuradha Bhat	3:58
Total length:				17:17

== Reception ==
The Times of India gave 2/5 stars, stating that "this romantic tale promises a lot, but doesn't eventually deliver." The idea of telling a story of an empowered woman is praised but it fails in its execution. The female lead character is painted as "more powerless than empowered" in a story filled with an "unconvincing" conflict and set of twists. The story is described as "a cop out" where "the treatment of characters seems hackneyed".

The Deccan Herald gave 2.5/5 stars and stated, "The film's title is based on a twist that isn't anywhere close to shocking. Somehow, 'Shrikrishna@gmail.com' consistently struggles to be the film it wants to be."
