= Veeram (2023 film) =

- Theatrical release poster
- Directed by: Khadar Kumar S
- Produced by: Shashidhar K M
- Starring: Prajwal Devraj; Rachita Ram; Srinagar Kitty; Shishya Deepak
- Cinematography: Lavith
- Edited by: Ravichandran
- Music by: Songs: J. Anoop Seelin; Score: Mr M
- Release date: 7 April 2023
- Country: India
- Language: Kannada

Veeram (transl. Valour) is a 2023 Indian Kannada-language action drama film directed by Khadar Kumar S and produced by Shashidhar K M under Shashidhar Studios. It stars Prajwal Devraj, Rachita Ram, Srinagar Kitty, Chirag Jani and Shishya Deepak.

Veeram was released theatrically on 7 April 2023 and received negative reviews from critics, where it bombed at the box office.

== Plot ==
Veeru and Narasimha are brothers and polar opposites in nature who lives a normal life with their sister Saraswathi and brother-in-law Sadashiva. One night, Sadashiva gets embroiled in the death of a goon named Deva due to the latter eliminating his chances in the market politics.

Veeru and Narasimha takes the blame and are arrested, where Saraswathi also berates them. Deva's arch rival and Narasimha's mentor Govinda gets them released from custody, but Deva's son Jeda finishes Narasimha. Learning this, Veeru sets out to avenge Narasimha's death.

Meanwhile, Seenu Bhai is a drug baron who searches for Veeru after he kills Seenu's brother to save several women. A cat-and-mouse game ensues between Veeru and Jeda, along with Seenu joining Jeda to finish Veeru. Veeru finally finishes Seenu and Jeda, thus avenging Narasimha's death. Saraswathi finally learns Veeru's innocence from Sadashiva where she reunites with Veeru and lead a happy life with their family.

== Cast ==
- Prajwal Devraj as Veeru
- Rachita Ram as Dhatri
- Srinagar Kitty as Narasimha
- Shishya Deepak as Jeda, Deva's son
- Bala Rajwadi as Deva
- Achyuth Kumar as Sadashiva
- Shruthi as Saraswathi
- Chirag Jani as Seenu Bhai
- Swathi
- Mico Nagaraj as Govinda
- Prashanth Natana
- Hanumanthe Gowda
- Joe Simon
- V. Nagendra Prasad
- Girish Shivanna

== Production ==
=== Development ===
On 18 September 2019, Darshan took to his social media accounts and shared the poster of the film.

=== Casting ===
In September 2019, Prajwal Devaraj and Rachita Ram were announced in the lead roles. Srinagara Kitty was selected to play a vital role. Chirag Jani and Shishya’ Deepak were announced as the film's antagonists.

=== Filming ===
The film was announced before Lockdown in India, but the shooting was stopped due to the COVID-19 pandemic. On 11 December 2020, principal photography started and filming was completed on 20 August 2021.

== Soundtrack ==
Veeram

Soundtrack album by J. Anoop Seelin
- Released: 2023
- Recorded: 2022
- Genre: Feature film soundtrack
- Length: 11:25
- Language: Kannada

Official audio
- Veeram - Full Album on YouTube

All music is composed by J. Anoop Seelin.

No.	Title	Lyrics	Artist(s)	Length
1.	"Shiva Shiva"	V. Nagendra Prasad	Ananya Bhat	4:34
2.	"Mounave Chenna"	Kaviraj	Nihal Tauro	3:36
3.	"Hodalo Bittu Hodalo"	V. Nagendra Prasad	Supriyaa Ram, J. Anoop Seelin	3:55
Total length:				11:25

== Release ==
The film was released on 7 April 2023.

=== Home media ===
The satellite and digital rights of the film were sold to Sun TV Network.

== Reception ==
=== Critical response ===
A. Sharadhaa of The New Indian Express wrote "This film is strictly for those, who wanted to see Prajwal Devaraj in a mass hero avatar, and for those who are still open to watching and enjoying commercial entertainers". Vinay Lokesh from The Times Of India gave 2.5 out of 5 stars and wrote "Director Khadar Kumar fails to strike a gold in his first attempt by taking up a subject which has been tried out umpteen times especially in Sandalwood". Swaroop Kodur of OTT Play says "It is tough to recommend a film that has very little to boast about but should you feel compelled to pay a customary visit to a cinema hall, then you may proceed towards this with caution". A reviewer of Udayavani wrote "Those who want an action packed family drama will like 'Veeram'". Y Maheswara Reddy of Bangalore Mirror says "Had the director avoided one or two action scenes, Veeram would have been a good one for all kinds of audiences".
