= Aramane =

- Film poster
- Directed by: Nagashekar
- Written by: Tushar Ranganath (Dialogues)
- Screenplay by: Preetham Gubbi
- Story by: Nagashekar; Shekhar Chandra
- Produced by: K. Manju
- Starring: Ganesh; Anant Nag; Roma
- Cinematography: Shekhar Chandra
- Edited by: P. R. Soundar Raj
- Music by: Gurukiran
- Production company: Lakshmi Shree Combines
- Distributed by: Jayanna Combines
- Release date: 25 April 2008
- Running time: 143 minutes
- Country: India
- Language: Kannada

Aramane (transl. Palace) is a 2008 Indian Kannada drama film directed by Nagashekar and produced by K. Manju, starring Ganesh, Anant Nag, and Roma in the lead roles. The plot of the film revolves around a wealthy businessman who is left isolated in his palatial house by his children after he decides to remarry on his wife's passing. He is befriended by a photographer who assures of bringing them together for 'one last photo' of the entire family. The music score and soundtrack was composed by Gurukiran.

== Plot ==
Arun is a photographer employed in a studio in Mysore. Also in the city is a very wealthy Rajashekhara Aras, living in his palatial house. Now a loner separated from his family, he has become a hard drinker, living with his manservant Basava. Arun is called one day to Aras' house to get his photo clicked for an official document. They befriend each other over a drink and Aras reveals to Arun that his children have left him when they learn of his decision to remarry on his wife's passing, twenty-two years ago. He wishes to get a photo clicked with his family one last time and pleads Arun to unite him with his three children who are now living Sydney, Bangalore, and Washington, D.C. Arun, initially reluctant, sees his distress and assures him.

On learning that the husband of Aras' eldest daughter is Prakash, a police commissioner in Bangalore, he acquires their residential address and befriends the couple's younger daughter Neetha. She is shocked by his revelation of her grandfather's existence, who she had always thought was dead as told by her parents. With Neetha's help he meets her elder sister Geetha who is a doctor in Mysore and befriends her. Gradually Arun falls in love with Geetha and Aras gets to know about Arun's love and feels happy and tells him to propose to her. Arun goes to propose to Geetha but Geetha excitedly tells Arun she is in love with her colleague and requests Arun to unite them as Geetha sees Arun as her best friend. Heartbroken Arun decides to unite the family during Geetha's marriage and finally he convinces Savitri, the elder daughter of Aras and she reconciles with her father and the whole family is united in Geetha's marriage. Arun finally takes their family picture and leaves the hall broken.

== Cast ==
- Ganesh as Arun
- Anant Nag as Rajashekhara Aras
- Roma as Geetha
- Avinash as Police commissioner Prakash
- Tara as Savitri
- Tejaswini Prakash as Neetha
- Karibasavaiah as Basava
- R. G. Vijayasarathy
- Santhosh Aryan
- Ganesh Rao
- Kashi
- Mithra
- Sri
- Dr. Nagesh
- Rekha Kumar
- Sumithra as Lakshmi in a cameo appearance
- Gurukiran in special appearance in song "Kolle Nannanne"
- Vasudha Bharighat in a cameo appearance

== Soundtrack ==
Aramane

Soundtrack album by Gurukiran
- Released: 22 March 2008
- Recorded: 2008
- Genre: Feature film soundtrack
- Length: 29:17
- Label: Skanda Audio
- Producer: Gurukiran

Gurukiran chronology
Maharadhi (2008)	Aramane (2008)	Nee Tata Naa Birla (2008)

Gurukiran composed the film score and the soundtrack, lyrics for which was penned by Kaviraj, Yogaraj Bhat, Jayant Kaikini and V. Nagendra Prasad. The soundtrack album consists of six tracks. It was released on 22 March 2008 in Bangalore, and was distributed into the market by Skanda Audio.

No.	Title	Lyrics	Artist(s)	Length
1.	"Uphee"	V. Nagendra Prasad	George Peter	4:49
2.	"Nagu Nagu"	Kaviraj	Rajesh Krishnan	4:57
3.	"Nanagu Ninagu"	Jayant Kaikini	Kunal Ganjawala	5:21
4.	"Pathra Bareyala"	Kaviraj	Karthik, Shweta Mohan	5:15
5.	"Nanna Edeyalli"	Yogaraj Bhat	Madhu Balakrishnan	4:28
6.	"Kolle Nannanne"	Kaviraj	Gurukiran	4:27
Total length:				29:17

== Reception ==
R. G. Vijayasarathy of Rediff.com rated the film 3/5 stars and wrote, "Aramane is a good film. Nagashekhar has certainly won his first battle as the director".

== Box office ==
The film received positive reviews from both critics and the audience and was declared a "super hit" by completing 100 days.
