= Pailwaan =

2019 Indian Kannada-language action film

- Theatrical release poster
- Directed by: S. Krishna
- Screenplay by: Krishna; D.S. Kannan; Madhoo
- Produced by: Swapna Krishna
- Starring: Sudeepa; Suniel Shetty; Aakanksha Singh; Kabir Duhan Singh; Sushant Singh; Avinash; Sharath Lohitashwa
- Narrated by: Ramesh Aravind
- Cinematography: A. Karunakar
- Edited by: Ruben
- Music by: Arjun Janya
- Production companies: Zee Studios; RRR Motion Pictures Production
- Distributed by: KRG Studios (Kannada); Zee Studios(Hindi); Vaaraahi Chalana Chitram (Telugu)
- Release date: 12 September 2019
- Running time: 166 minutes
- Country: India
- Language: Kannada
- Budget: ₹40 crore
- Box office: ₹52.70 crore

Pailwaan (transl. Wrestler) is a 2019 Indian Kannada-language sports-masala film written and directed by S. Krishna. The film is produced by Swapna Krishna under the banner RRR Motion Pictures and bankrolled by Zee Studios. It stars Sudeepa, Sunil Shetty and Aakanksha Singh in the lead roles, while Kabir Duhan Singh, Sushant Singh, Avinash, and Sharath Lohitashwa play supporting roles. The film marks Sunil Shetty and Aakanksha Singh's Kannada cinema debut. The score and soundtrack of the film was composed by Arjun Janya. The film follows the journey of an orphan who goes on to become a wrestler and a boxer while getting into brawls with those who disrupt his personal life.

Initially the film team planned to release it in nine languages, but later it settled for five languages, due to the Hindi language theatrical release. The film released on 12 September 2019, while the Hindi version opened a day later, on 13 September.

== Plot ==
Tony Sebastian is a renowned boxer who often plays dirty (resorting to dirty tactics) to win the matches. He kills his opponent towards the end of one such match, following which his coach, Vijayendra, tries to make him understand but sets out to find another student as his replacement when Tony does not listen. Vijayendra arrives at the house of a former wrestler named Sarkar living in Gajendragarh and learns the story of a young orphan named Krishna whom Sarkar witnessed fighting off a group of boys in exchange for helping other kids get food. This impressed Sarkar, who then adopted Krishna and turned him into a wrestler, Kichcha, who emerged victorious in every wrestling competition that he participated in.

However, a goon mocked Sarkar during the match, causing Kichcha to fight him and his goons in a temple where Rukmini noticed him. They met and fell in love, despite Kichcha's vow not to fall in love until he became a national champion. The goon whom Kichcha had beaten up turned out to be a henchman of Raja Rana Pratap Singh, an oppressive ruler of Ranasthalipura who had to be defeated in a wrestling match if Kichcha wanted to fulfill his father's dream. In the meanwhile, Rukmini's father opposed their marriage upon thinking Kichcha was after her wealth. Rukmini's father reported Kichcha to Sarkar, who indirectly instructed him to focus only on wrestling.

With Rukmini's marriage and his wrestling match with Rana happening on the same day, Kichcha first fought off and defeated Rana. He then proceeded to marry Rukmini against her father's wishes. Rukmini's father insults Sarkar, who ordered Kichcha to leave the house along with his wife, along with the wrestling tactics that he has been taught. Years pass by, and Kichcha is living with his wife and daughter peacefully, often doing small jobs to make a living. On the other hand, Rana is still traumatized by the defeat and pays visits at Kichcha's house, inviting him for another match. However, despite the threats, Kichcha peacefully declines. On the other hand, Vijayendra ends up locating Kichcha and decides to meet him.

Meanwhile, Rukmini's father meets Sarkar and tells him that Kichcha was not after his daughter's wealth, and that he brought her and their daughter at the hospital to meet him, thus clearing all the trouble in their relationship. However, Rana kidnaps Kichcha's daughter, and his goons beat up Kichcha when he refuses to wrestle. Seeing that he has kept his promise of not wrestling, Sarkar arrives and fights some of the goons, leaving the rest and Rana himself to be beaten up by an injured Kichcha. Rana is arrested by the police, and Kichcha reunites with Sarkar. Having seen Kichcha's fighting skills, Vijayendra asks him to train for a boxing match. Kichcha tells Sarkar that with the prize money, he wants to help the poor but talented children who are unable to fulfill their dreams due to poverty.

Sarkar and Vijayendra starts training Kichcha, and on the day of the match, Kichcha is initially unable to fight properly and at times ends up using wrestling techniques that are not permitted as per the rules. However, he soon starts defeating his opponents one by one, resulting in a match with Tony where the latter fights dirty and injures Kichcha using illegal moves, bringing him in a situation where low eyesight could result in disqualification. However, the doctor helps Kichcha with the vision test, and the fight resumes. Despite being injured badly, Kichcha manages to defeat Tony. After the match, Tony receives a cookie from Vijayendra's bakery as a response to a joke he had cracked earlier, and Kichcha now sets out to fulfill Sarkar's dream by entering a national level wrestling match representing India.

== Cast ==
- Sudeepa as Pailwan Kichcha/Krishna, a pro wrestler
- Suniel Shetty as Sarkar, Kichcha's mentor
- Aakanksha Singh as Rukmini, Kichcha's love interest & wife
- Kabir Duhan Singh as Tony Sebastian, a rival boxer
- Sushant Singh as Raja Rana Pratap Singh, the king of Ranasthalipura
- Avinash Yelandur as Rukmini's father
- Sharath Lohitashwa as Boxing Coach Vijayendra
- Ramesh Aravind as Narrator

== Production ==
Director of the film S. Krishna announced on Ganesh Chaturthi in August 2017, the project under RRR Motion Pictures, produced by his wife, Swapna Krishna. The film is to star Sudeepa. The director on turning producer said, "Turning producer is a big responsibility".

== Soundtrack ==
Pailwaan

Soundtrack album by Arjun Janya
- Released: 18 August 2019
- Recorded: 2018–2019
- Genre: Feature film soundtrack
- Language: Kannada
- Labels: Lahari Music; T-Series
- Producer: Arjun Janya

Arjun Janya chronology
| Amar (2019) | Pailwaan (2019) | Kotigobba 3 (2019) |
External audio
- Audio Hindi Jukebox on YouTube
- Audio Kannada Jukebox on YouTube
- Audio Telugu Jukebox on YouTube
- Audio Malayalam Jukebox on YouTube
- Audio Tamil Jukebox on YouTube

Singles from Pehlwaan
- 1. "Banda Nodu Pailwaan" Released: 11 July 2019; 2. "Kanmaniye" Released: 16 July 2019; 3. "Baaro Pailwaan" Released: 30 July 2019; 4. "Dorasaani" Released: 9 August 2019; 5. "Dhruvataare" Released: 15 August 2019

The soundtrack of this film launched by Puneeth Rajkumar on 18 August. Audio jukebox of Pailwaan contains 6 songs and 3 theme musics. All 5 language jukebox released presented through Lahari Music and T-Series.

=== Tracklists ===
All lyrics are written by V. Nagendra Prasad.

Kannada tracklist
| No. | Title | Singer(s) | Length |
|---|---|---|---|
| 1. | "Banda Nodu Pailwan Theme" | Vyasaraj | 3:13 |
| 2. | "Kanmaniye" | Sanjith Hegde | 3:35 |
| 3. | "Baaro Pailwan" | Vijay Prakash, Kailash Kher, Chandan Shetty | 3:59 |
| 4. | "Dorassani" | Vijay Prakash | 4:18 |
| 5. | "Dhruvataare" | Armaan Malik | 4:49 |
| 6. | "Dheerane" | Vijay Prakash, Siddharth Basrur | 4:26 |
| 7. | "Naanu Neenu" | Naresh Iyer, Sruthy Sasidharan | 3:11 |
| 8. | "Mangalyam Theme" | Arjun Janya | 2:18 |
| 9. | "Stunt Theme" | Arjun Janya | 1:50 |
| 10. | "Kannu Chappale" | Vyas Raj, Sony |
| Total length: | | | 31:40 |

Hindi tracklist
| No. | Title | Lyrics | Singer(s) | Length |
|---|---|---|---|---|
| 1. | "Dekho Aaya" | Astha Jagiasi | Vyasaraj, Dev Negi | 3:12 |
| 2. | "Dil Jaaniye" | Astha Jagiasi | Sanjith Hegde | 3:36 |
| 3. | "Jai Ho Pehlwaan" | Astha Jagiasi | Swaroop Khan, Vyasaraj, MC Vickey | 4:00 |
| 4. | "Challa Yaar" | Astha Jagiasi, Sujeet Shetty | Vijay Prakash | 4:19 |
| 5. | "Saiyaare" | Astha Jagiasi, Sujeet Shetty | Armaan Malik | 4:49 |
| 6. | "Lakshya Ko" | Astha Jagiasi, Sujeet Shetty | Vijay Prakash, Siddharth Basrur, Jasraj Joshi | 4:25 |
| 7. | "Teri Meri" | Astha Jagiasi, Sujeet Shetty | Hriday Ghattani, Aditi Paul, Rahul Nambiar | 3:10 |
| 8. | "Mangalyam Theme" | | Arjun Janya | 2:17 |
| 9. | "Stunt Theme" | | Arjun Janya | 1:51 |
| Total length: | | | | 31:40 |

Tamil tracklist
| No. | Title | Lyrics | Singer(s) | Length |
|---|---|---|---|---|
| 1. | "Varran Paaru Bailwaan - Theme Song" | Mohan Raj | Vyasaraj | 03:13 |
| 2. | "Kannu Maniye" | | Sanjith Hegde | 03:34 |
| 3. | "Jai Ho Pailwaan" | | Deepak Blue, Mukesh, MC Vickey | 04:00 |
| 4. | "Vaanam Vittu" | | Naresh Iyer, Sruthy Sasidharan, Rahul Nambiar | 03:10 |
| 5. | "Enna Panna" | | Vijay Prakash | 04:17 |
| 6. | "Vin Meeney" | | Naresh Iyer | 04:47 |
| 7. | "Stunt Theme" | | Arjun Janya | 01:50 |
| 8. | "Poridu" | | Vijay Prakash, Siddharth Basrur | 04:25 |
| 9. | "Mangalyam Theme" | | Arjun Janya | 02:17 |
| Total length: | | | | 31:33 |

All lyrics are written by Ramajogayya Sastry.

Telugu tracklist
| No. | Title | Lyrics | Singer(s) | Length |
|---|---|---|---|---|
| 1. | "Vachaadayyo Pahalwan - Theme Song" | Ramajogayya Sastry | Vyasaraj | 03:13 |
| 2. | "Kanne Pichuka" | | Sanjith Hegde | 03:34 |
| 3. | "Jai Ho Pahalwan" | | Sai Charan Bhaskaruni, Saketh | 03:59 |
| 4. | "Fire-U-Brandu" | | Revanth | 04:17 |
| 5. | "Dhruvataara" | | Anurag Kulkarni | 04:47 |
| 6. | "Yodhudaa" | | Vijay Prakash, Siddharth Basrur | 04:24 |
| 7. | "Mangalyam Theme" | | Arjun Janya | 02:17 |
| 8. | "Stunt Theme" | | Arjun Janya | 01:50 |
| 9. | "Prema Kaalam" | | Sri Krishna, Ramya Behara, Rahul Nambiar | 03:11 |
| Total length: | | | | 31:32 |

Malayalam tracklist
| No. | Title | Singer(s) | Length |
|---|---|---|---|
| 1. | "Kanninmaniye" | Sanjith Hegde | 03:34 |
| 2. | "Vanne Vanne Pailwaan - Theme Song" | Naveen Madhav | 03:13 |
| 3. | "Va Va Pailwaan" | Deepesh, MC Vickey | 04:00 |
| 4. | "Ellamalle" | Sarath Santosh | 04:17 |
| 5. | "Dhruvataare" | Naresh Iyer | 04:47 |
| 6. | "Stunt Theme" | Arjun Janya | 01:50 |
| 7. | "Njanum Neeyum" | Jithin, Sruthy Sasidharan, Rahul Nambiar | 03:11 |
| 8. | "Mangalyam Theme" | Arjun Janya | 02:17 |
| 9. | "Veerane" | Kapil | 04:25 |
| Total length: | | | 31:34 |

== Release ==
The film released in Kannada and dubbed versions in Hindi (titled Baadshah Pehlwaan), Telugu, Tamil and Malayalam languages. It was to release on Varamahalakshmi festival on 9 August, but delayed and was released on 12 September.

== Awards and nominations ==
9th South Indian International Movie Awards

- Best Actor in a Negative Role - Kannada (2019) - Kabir Duhan Singh - nominated.
- Best Comedian - Kannada (2019) - Appanna - Nominated
- Best Debut Producer - Kannada (2019) - RRR Motion Pictures - Nominated

Karnataka State Film Awards

- Best Actor - Sudeepa (rejected)
