= Nagashekar =

Indian writer, film director, actor and producer

- Born: Nagashekar Rachaiah; 11 November 1979 (age 46); Malavalli, Mandya, Karnataka, India
- Occupations: Director, actor, screenwriter
- Years active: 2002-present
- Awards: SIIMA Award for Best Director for Sanju Weds Geetha (2011)

Nagashekar is an Indian writer, film director, actor and producer primarily working in Kannada cinema. Starting his career as an actor in Ninagagi (2002), he went on to feature in supporting roles more than 50 films until he turned into direction for the film, Aramane in 2008. Later, he directed successful films such as Sanju Weds Geetha (2011), Myna (2013) and Maasthi Gudi (2017). He debuted into the Telugu cinema with the film Gurthunda Seethakalam (2022).

For Sanju Weds Geetha (2011), Nagashekar won the SIIMA Award for Best Director – Kannada at the 1st South Indian International Movie Awards (SIIMA Awards).

== Career ==
Nagashekar started his career as a comedy actor in the film Ninagagi in 2002. The film, directed by S. Mahendar, starred Vijay Raghavendra and Radhika Kumaraswamy making their debut in lead roles. This was followed by B. Suresha's film Tapori in the same year. In the following years, he took up many acting assignments as comedian. Noteworthy films include Joke Falls (2004), Veera Kannadiga (2004), Jogi (2005), Mast Maja Maadi (2008), Addhuri (2012), Maanikya (2014), Gajakesari (2014) and Cigarette (2015).

His first film as a director was Aramane in 2008 which starred Ganesh and Roma Asrani. His next two films Sanju Weds Geetha (2011) and Myna (2013) were hugely successful and established him as a leading film director in Kannada cinema. All the three films completed a successful run of 100 days at the theaters. He also won several awards for his director and dialogues in these films. His fourth directorial was Maasthi Gudi in 2017 in which he teamed up with Duniya Vijay. The film was talked about for the accidental death of two actors while filming stunt scenes at Thippagondanahalli reservoir. However, upon release, the film was commercially successful.

In 2019, Nagashekar was chosen by the producer Sandesh Nagaraj to be the director for Abhishek Ambareesh's debut film Amar. Upon release, the film received negative reviews from critics and audiences alike and performed average at the box-office. Following this failure project, he took a sabbatical for two years and came up with SriKrishna@gmail.com in 2021 amidst the COVID-19 pandemic time. The film went unnoticed and there were no takers. This forced him to venture in Telugu cinema in 2023 by directing a remake subject titled Gurthunda Seethakalam, a remake of Kannada film Love Mocktail. The film was an average grosser at the box-office.

Nagashekar returned to Kannada cinema with the film titled Sanju Weds Geetha 2, which according to his statement, is not a sequel of his 2011 film.

== Personal life ==
Nagashekar is born in a village in Malavalli taluk of Mandya district in Karnataka.

== Filmography ==
All films are in Kannada unless otherwise noted.

=== As director ===
Year	Film	Notes
2008	Aramane	
2010	Sugreeva	One among 10 directors
2011	Sanju Weds Geetha	
2013	Myna	
2017	Maasthi Gudi	
2019	Amar	
2021	SriKrishna@gmail.com	
2022	Gurthunda Seethakalam	Telugu film; also producer
2025	Sanju Weds Geetha 2	
TBA	November Mazhaiyil Naanum Avalum	Delayed; Tamil film; also producer

=== As actor ===
- Ninagagi (2002)
- Tapori (2002)
- Mani (2003)
- Game For Love (2003)
- Hudugigagi (2003)
- Veera Kannadiga (2004)
- Ranga (S.S.L.C) (2004)
- Baa Baaro Rasika (2004)
- Bhagavan (2004)
- Omkara (2004)
- Joke Falls (2004)
- Jogi (2005)
- Masala (2005)
- Magic Ajji (2005)
- Swamy (2005)
- Aadi (2005)
- Vishnu Sena (2005)
- Yashwanth (2005)
- Pandavaru (2006)
- Kannadada Kanda (2006)
- Shree (2006)
- Ee Rajeev Gandhi Alla (2007)
- Preethigaagi (2007)
- Bhakta (2007)
- Marujanma (2008)
- Beladingalagi Baa (2008)
- Mast Maja Maadi (2008)
- Navashakthi Vaibhava (2008)
- Kodagana Koli Nungitha (2008)
- Swathanthra Palya (2009)
- Bellary Naga (2009)
- Jaaji Mallige (2009)
- Ullasa Utsaha (2010)
- Sri Harikathe (2010)
- Sugreeva (2010)
- Aithalakkadi (2010)
- Cheluveye Ninne Nodalu (2010)
- Hori (2011)
- Gowri Putra (2012)
- Addhuri (2012)
- Maanikya (2014)
- Chandralekha (2014)
- Gajakesari (2014)
- Katte (2015)
- Cigarette (2015)
- Tharle Nan Maklu (2016)
- Veera Ranachandi (2017)
- November Mazhaiyil Naanum Avalum (TBA)

== Awards ==
Film	Award	Category	Result	Ref.
Sanju Weds Geetha	1st South Indian International Movie Awards	Best Director	Won	
Sanju Weds Geetha	Suvarna Film Awards	Best Director	Won	
Myna	2013 Karnataka State Film Awards	Best Dialogue	Won	
Myna	61st Filmfare Awards South	Best Director	Nominated	
