= Maasthi Gudi =

Maasti Gudi
- Poster
- Directed by: Nagashekar
- Story by: Duniya Vijay
- Produced by: Sundar P. Gowdru; Anil Kumar V.
- Starring: Duniya Vijay; Kriti Kharbanda; Amulya
- Cinematography: Satya Hegde
- Edited by: Joni Harsha
- Music by: Sadhu Kokila
- Production company: KPS Combines
- Release date: 12 May 2017
- Country: India
- Language: Kannada

Masti Gudi is a 2017 Indian Kannada-language action film directed by Nagashekar, starring Duniya Vijay who plays the titular character, and also credited for the film's story, alongside Kriti Kharbanda and Amulya in lead roles.

On 7 November 2016, actors Anil Kumar and Raghava Uday drowned when they took a 60-feet plunge from a chopper while shooting film's climax. A rescue motorboat scheduled to pull the actors out of the water did not start, resulting in the immediate drowning of both the actors.

== Summary ==
Maasthi questions powerful people killing tigers, and then takes the law into his own hands. Enter Rani. She learns of Bhavya, who was killed by her own family for eloping with Maasthi. Rani reveals her love for him. But he rejects her, saying that he still has Bhavya in his heart leaving Rani heartbroken. He kills the villains. The film shifts to present where Rani is now old and has written Maasthi's story in a book.

== Cast ==
- Duniya Vijay as Maasthi
- Kriti Kharbanda as Rani
- Amulya as Bhavya
- B. Jayashree
- Srinivasa Murthy
- H. G. Dattatreya
- Shobaraj
- Devaraj as Forest Officer
- Sadhu Kokila
- Raghava Uday
- * Anil Kumar (voice dubbed by Vasishta N. Simha)
- Suhasini Maniratnam
- Rangayana Raghu as Ajju
- M. K. Mata
- Ravishankar Gowda

== Controversies ==
=== Accident ===
Actors Anil Kumar and Raghava Uday drowned while performing an action scene at Thippagondanahalli Reservoir, 35 kilometers west of Bangalore on 7 November. The action scene was shot under the supervision of stunt director Ravi Varma and the scene required Duniya Vijay with Anil Kumar and Raghava Uday jumping off into the lake from the helicopter. Duniya Vijay managed to swim ashore but Anil and Uday were not able to make it to the shore.

== Soundtrack ==
Masti Gudi

Soundtrack album by Sadhu Kokila
- Released: 23 February 2017
- Recorded: 2016
- Genre: Feature film soundtrack
- Length: 24:43
- Language: Kannada
- Label: Jhankar Music

Sadhu Kokila chronology
Kiragoorina Gayyaligalu (2016)	Masti Gudi (2017)	Uppi Rupee (2017)

Sadhu Kokila composed the soundtrack for the film. The soundtrack album consists of five songs. Lyrics for the tracks were written by Kaviraj.

All lyrics are written by Kaviraj.

No.	Title	Artist(s)	Length
1.	"Chippinolagade"	Sonu Nigam, Shreya Ghoshal	4:38
2.	"Summane"	Shreya Ghoshal	4:46
3.	"Bari Nalku Dina"	Vijay Prakash	4:48
4.	"Ondu Huduga"	Sonu Nigam	5:07
5.	"Jenu Thandevo"	Kailash Kher, B. Jayashree, B. R. Chaya	5:22
Total length:			24:43

== Reception ==
The Times of India rated the film 2.5 out of 5, saying, "While this film does seem a tad underwhelming eventually, one can definitely go and watch the film for Vijay's acting and the underlying message about forest conservation".

== See also ==
- List of film accidents
