= Chirag Jani =

Chirag Jani may refer to:

- Chirag Jani (cricketer)
- Chirag Jani (actor)
