= Hebbuli =

2017 film by Krishna

- Directed by: S. Krishna
- Written by: S. Krishna
- Produced by: Raghunath; Umapathy Srinivas
- Starring: Sudeepa; V. Ravichandran; Amala Paul; P. Ravi Shankar; Kabir Duhan Singh; Ravi Kishan
- Cinematography: A. Karunakar
- Edited by: Deepu S. Kumar
- Music by: Arjun Janya
- Production company: SRV Productions
- Distributed by: Mysore Talkies
- Release date: 23 February 2017
- Running time: 141 minutes
- Country: India
- Language: Kannada
- Budget: ₹20 crore
- Box office: ₹26–36 crore (Note: The producer claimed the gross to be around ₹26-27 crores as against a trade estimate of ₹36.40 crore)

Hebbuli (transl. Ferocious tiger) is a 2017 Kannada-language action thriller film directed by S. Krishna and produced by Raghunath and Umapathy Srinivas. The film stars Sudeep and V. Ravichandran in an extended cameo, who teamed up for the second time after Maanikya (2014). Amala Paul made her debut in Kannada cinema. P. Ravi Shankar, Kabir Duhan Singh and Ravi Kishan (also making his Kannada debut) play the antagonists.

Produced by SRV Productions and Umapathy Films. The cinematography is by A. Karunakar. The soundtrack and film score are composed by Arjun Janya. Principal photography commenced in Bengaluru in mid-June 2016, continuing in Hyderabad, Jammu-Kashmir, and Iceland.

Hebbuli was released on 23 February 2017 and received positive reviews from critics, where it became a commercial success at the box office.

== Plot ==
Para Commando Captain Ram rescues 3 doctors of their relief camp including Dr. Nandini (who is from Bangalore) from terrorists. Nandini falls in love with him but does not express it. One night, Ram receives a letter stating that his brother IAS officer Sathyamoorthy has died. He arrives at Bangalore and takes the case himself, which had been ruled as a suicide. He discusses this with his brother's wife's brother ACP Prathap. Prathap reveals that Sathyamoorthy had punished a corporator for an illegal act but was arrested and suspended for killing the corporator. The next day, he was found dead. He tells him to reopen the case since he feels it is a murder. He gets a clue from his brother's room that someone hanged his brother and finds the culprit to be of height around 6'2" to 6'3" and left-handed.

Ram also asks Sathyamoorthy's wife, Anuradha where she describes two incidents that reveals that Sathyamoorthy was arrested for the corporator's murder and was suspended. He also felt shattered about his driver's family's suicide (His driver had asked him for help for his daughter's operation as she was suffering from cancer. Sathyamurthy had arranged the funds to help him but he was found dead). The police interrogated all the goons of the characteristics given by Ram, but one was left. Ram arrives at the place in order to get him arrested, but he escapes with the help of his henchmen and is hit by a car. Later, a man named Kabir kills him. In the house, Ram sketches the car driver's picture and his shirt picture. He asks Nandini about him to find him.

Nandini finds him in a gym and reaches his hideout, but Ram reach the hideout on time and chase after the man. They reach a building under construction where Ram confronts him and the man tells him that they are dangerous and influential people and kills himself by jumping off the building, but Ram takes his mobile phone and after decoding his mobile data with the help of his army personnel, he discovers the real people behind his brother's death. The culprit is revealed to be Minister Arasikere Anjanappa and Amruth Shah, who is the president of the pharmaceutical association. Arasikere tells him about Ram, where they send Kabir to follow Ram, but Ram eventually captures Kabir and reveals the truth at gunpoint.

Sathyamoorthy decided to start generic medicine after he got disturbed by the driver's family's suicide. He discusses it with Anjanappa, but Anjanappa joins Amruth Shah and Kabir to use the generic medicine for their business profits. Sathyamurthy opposes, due to which Anjanappa gets Sathyamoorthy arrested on false charges for the corporator's murder and suspended from his job. At night, Sathyamurthy calls him, recording the calls for evidence. Kabir secretly barged into Sathyamoorthy's house with his henchman and blackmailed him to hand over the documents related to the generic medicine putting Anuradha and his daughter who are sleeping at gunpoint. Kabir finally kills him and stages it as a suicide.

Amruth Shah and Anjanappa torture Anuradha and reveal that Ram will abandon his mission and hand over the evidence to them. They planned to kill him and kidnap Sathyamoorthy's daughter. Ram hands over Kabir to them, but Anjanappa and Amruth Shah kill Kabir for revealing their secrets and thrash Ram. Anjanappa then reveals the whole truth of Sathyamurthy's death, who along with Amruth Shah leaves him for dead. However, Ram reveals that he recorded the whole incident with a spy camera hidden on his jacket and broadcast it on respective news channels, to secretly reveal their hidden face to the public and had also saved Sathyamoorthy's daughter with the help of his colleagues. After the revelation, Ram kills them and makes it look like a suicide and reinstate back into the Indian Army.

== Cast ==
- Sudeepa as Captain Ram, Para (Special Forces)
- Ravichandran as Sathya Moorthy IAS, Ram's brother (Extended Cameo)
- Amala Paul as Dr. Nandini, Ram's love interest
- Kabir Duhan Singh as Kabir
- P. Ravi Shankar as Arasikere Anjanappa
- Ravi Kishan as Amruth Shah
- Ravi Kale as Colonel Murali Menon
- Kalyani as Anuradha Sathya Moorthy (Satya's wife)
- Avinash as ACP Prathap
- Chikkanna as Sundara
- Prachi R. Naik as Ritu (Sathya Moorthy's daughter)
- Anil Kumar as the suspect
- Sanjeev Sarovar as a school teacher

== Production ==
=== Casting ===
After hiring Sudeepa to play the protagonist, the director cast P. Ravi Shankar to play a negative role opposite Sudeepa. Since the plot required a parallel male lead to play Sudeepa's brother, the director approached V. Ravichandran to play the character. Actress Amala Paul, who was on the lookout for a fresh script in Kannada, was signed to play the female lead. For the other antagonist roles, Kabir Duhan Singh and finally Ravi Kishan were selected.

=== Costume design ===
Sudeepa sported a unique hairstyle in the film in which half of his hair was kept short while the other half was grown long and tied back.

== Release ==
The film opened on the occasion of Maha Shivaratri on 23 February 2017 on 400 screens across the country. On 3 January 2019, the film's Tamil version Poiyattam was successful released. The film was also dubbed and released in Hindi in 2018.

== Soundtrack ==
Hebbuli

Soundtrack album by Arjun Janya
- Released: 25 December 2016
- Recorded: 2016
- Genre: Feature film soundtrack
- Length: 20:21
- Language: Kannada
- Label: Zee Music
- Producer: Arjun Janya

Arjun Janya chronology
Mukunda Murari (2016)	Hebbuli (2016)	Chakravarthy (2017)

Arjun Janya scored the soundtrack and film score collaborating with Sudeepa for the fifth time. He composed six songs, including one theme song. The audio was released on 25 December 2016 at Davangere in the presence of the cast and crew. The songs were leaked before Audio Launch. Music label, Zee Music acquired the audio rights making it the firm's first ever Kannada project.

Track listing
No.	Title	Lyrics	Singer(s)	Length
1.	"Hulli Hulli"	Chethan	Siddharth Basrur	3:36
2.	"Sundari"	Santhosh Naik	Vijay Prakash, Anuradha Bhat	3:23
3.	"Usire Usire"	Kaviraj	Shaan, Shreya Ghoshal	4:06
4.	"Devare"	Harsha Priya	Armaan Malik	3:55
5.	"Yennenu Soda"	Santhosh Naik	Rajesh Krishnan, Vijay Prakash	3:27
6.	"Hebbuli Theme"		Jack Style, Arunraja Kamaraj	1:58
Total length:				20:25

== Reception ==
Sunayana Suresh of The Times of India gave a rating of 4/5 and wrote "If you don't want the typical masala entertainment and are looking for something that moves beyond the staple big hero potboilers then this is for you. Hebbuli cleverly integrates an important issue, while still retaining massy elements. Go watch this one, it will not fail to entertain you". Rakesh Mehar of The News Minute wrote "At the end of its runtime, Hebbuli is the kind of big-budget film that Sandalwood has learnt to roll out with regularity: with enough spectacle and heroism to please the fans, but falling short of that something extra to draw in the rest of the crowd".

IndiaGlitz gave 4/5 rating and wrote "This is a marvelous treat from producer Raghunath and Umapathy. The support of producers for a film with good cause and commercial intersperse is the right mode of film for audience today. This is definitely watchable film for family and fans". Prakash Upadhyaya of IBTimes India wrote "Hebbuli has a decent storyline. Director S Krishna gets full marks for taking the film to a commercial conclusion with neatly conveyed messages, but the placements of songs and romantic portion between Sudeep and Amala Paul become speed breakers. Nonetheless, Kiccha's electrifying screen presence hides all the shortcomings. Overall, the film is a good entertainer if watched without finding faults like logical loopholes or bad editing".
