= Gurthunda Seethakalam =

2022 Indian Telugu film by Nagasekhar

- Theatrical release poster
- Directed by: Nagashekar
- Based on: Love Mocktail (Kannada) by Krishna
- Produced by: Bhavana Ravi; Nagashekar; Ramarao Chintapalli
- Starring: Satyadev; Tamannaah Bhatia
- Cinematography: Satya Hegde
- Edited by: Kotagiri Venkateswara Rao
- Music by: Kaala Bhairava
- Production companies: Nagashekar Movies; Manikanta Entertainments; Sri Vedaakshara Movies
- Release date: 9 December 2022
- Running time: 143 minutes
- Country: India
- Language: Telugu

Gurthunda Seethakalam (transl. Do you remember the winter?) is a 2022 Indian Telugu-language romantic drama film directed by Nagashekar. A remake of the 2020 Kannada film Love Mocktail, it stars Satyadev and Tamannaah Bhatia. The plot follows a middle-aged software employee, who endures several heartbreaks in his quest to find true love.

Gurthunda Seethakalam's production began in August 2020. The film faced multiple delays starting in February 2022. Finally, the film was theatrically released on 9 December 2022.

== Cast ==
- Satyadev as Satyadev "Dev", Nidhi's husband.
- Tamannaah Bhatia as Nidhi, Satyadev's wife.
- Megha Akash as Divya
- Kavya Shetty as Amrutha
- Suhasini Maniratnam as a Doctor
- Priyadarshi as Prashanth, Dev's friend
- Harshini as Geetha, Prashanth's wife

== Production ==
Gurthunda Seethakalam is the Telugu remake of the 2020 Kannada film Love Mocktail. The film was formally launched in August 2020, with second schedule taking place in Hyderabad in December 2020. Megha Akash and Kavya Shetty were also cast in the film.

== Music ==
The music is composed by Kaala Bhairava. The filmmakers stated that the audio rights were sold for ₹75 lakh (US$78,000).

1) "Gurthundha Seethakalam Title Track" - Sanjith Hegde

2) "Anaganaganaga" - Sonu Nigam

3) "Suhasini" - Armaan Malik

4) "Seethala Kaalam" - Shreya Ghoshal

== Release ==
Gurthunda Seethakalam faced numerous delays in its release schedule. Initially set for February 2022, the film experienced multiple postponements, moving its release to June, July, August and September 2022. It finally premiered in theatres on 09 December 2022 and later became available on Amazon Prime Video starting 20 January 2023.

== Reception ==
=== Critical response ===
Sangeetha Devi Dundoo from The Hindu wrote "These done-to-death tropes in stories featuring a character battling terminal illness need a rethink. Winter, mist and a question of life and death in romance cannot make every film a Geethanjali". Balakrishna Ganeshan from The News Minute says "Though Tamannaah and Satyadev try to give a convincing performance, they can’t salvage the film already damaged by its poor writing. Megha Akash plays a small role in the film, but she too does not make a lasting impression". A reviewer of Eenadu wrote "Nagasekhar seems to have brought Matrutaka to the screen as it is. If School Days Love track was removed, it would have been matched at least in terms of length. Kala Bairava's music and Satya Hegde's cinematography give strength to the film. The production values match the story".
