= Gajakesari =

2014 Indian film by S. Krishna

- Theatrical release poster
- Directed by: S. Krishna
- Screenplay by: Tharun Sudhir; S. Krishna
- Story by: S. Krishna; Tharun Sudhir
- Produced by: Jayanna; Bhogendra
- Starring: Yash; Amulya
- Cinematography: Satya Hegde
- Edited by: Deepu S. Kumar
- Music by: V. Harikrishna
- Production company: Jayanna Combines
- Distributed by: Jayanna films
- Release date: 23 May 2014
- Running time: 155 minutes
- Country: India
- Language: Kannada
- Budget: ₹4−7 crore
- Box office: est. ₹30 crore

Gajakesari (transl. The elephant lion) is a 2014 Indian Kannada-language action fantasy film directed by S. Krishna and produced by Jayanna and Bogendra. The film stars Yash in a dual role along with Amulya and Anant Nag. The film also prominently features an elephant named Arjuna from Waynad, Kerala. Actor Prakash Raj plays as narrator for the film to introduce Yash's character. This film is also dubbed in Hindi as The Big Lion Gajakesari.

== Plot ==
The film begins in the forest area of Aanegudde, an elephant reserve. A state minister arrives at the place of a local don, Rana. Rana forces the minister to sign a deal to open a resort at Anegudde. The minister signs reluctantly after seeing his bodyguard being murdered by Rana.

The scene next shifts to Prakash Raj introducing an ancient temple in the royal city of Mysore called the "Shankara Narayana" temple, which is being managed by a holy Muth (holy association), headed by the pontiff (Anant Nag). The Muth has an outstanding reputation for not being involved in any politics and also being equally revered by both Shaivites and Vaishnavites. Then comes into the picture, the hero Krishna (Yash), with his mother (Girija Lokesh). Krishna is a happy-go-lucky youth, a hard-core fan of Dr. Rajkumar, who has a kind heart for people and is involved in a small-time loan financing company. It is revealed that Krishna's family is very much devoted to the Muth and also that he was born after Krishna's father pledged that Krishna would be sent to become the next Pontiff of the Muth after Anant Nag. In this context, Krishna is given a warm welcome at the Muth and is requested by the Muth's head (Anant Nag) to take up the spiritual leadership. Krishna refuses as he feels he is still attached to worldly ambitions, and he requests the pontiff to suggest an alternative. The Pontiff says that Krishna has to donate an elephant to the Muth if he cannot take up the leadership of the Muth.

Krishna first tries several ways to avoid taking up the Sanyasa ashramam in various negative ways, but each time in his attempt, he is given full respect and protected. Krishna finally goes in search of the elephant and hence sets foot in the forest of Aaneguddi. He takes the help of the local Forest officer "Agni" (Rangayana Raghu), who introduces him to the forest tribal people. The ancestors of these tribal people have been in that forest for centuries and have taken care of the local elephants. They befriend Krishna, and some incidents make Krishna meet a single strong elephant, "Kalinga", who is feared by the tribal folk for his roughness. Krishna also meets a young ecologist (Amulya).

The local don Rana hatches a plan to evict the local tribal folk from their homes and build a resort there. When he comes there with his henchmen, Krishna and Amoolya revolt and help the folk. Krishna fights the henchmen and creates fear in the mind of Rana. Rana takes his right-hand man, Selva, to kill Krishna, and at this juncture, the elephant Kalinga comes to his rescue. The head of the tribal folk sees Krishna reducing the anger of Kalinga and deduces that he is definitely the incarnation of Baahubali (Yash), a fierce warrior in the army of the King of Karunadu. The tribal chief then narrates the story about the valour of Baahubali. The king of Karunadu is about to be attacked by King Verma. At this juncture, Baahubali defeats one of the strongest warriors of Verma. Saddened at this, Verma resorts to a cunning way and makes Baahubali's close friend poison Baahubali. When he is poisoned, Verma attacks him with his army along with the traitor minister of Karunadu. Despite his dying state, Baahubali single-handedly defeats the entire army of Verma and kills them. In this fight, Baahubali loses his pet elephant, "Balarama" (this is the elephant that has incarnated as Kalinga), who kills some of the enemy soldiers and dies. Finally, Baahubali dies, and the king of Karunadu awards the title of "Gajakesari" to Baahubali for his meritorious act of bravery and his service to the Motherland.

Now, Krishna, having known his past life, faces Rana and his henchmen and is almost killed. The Pontiff Anantnag, having sensed Krishna's battle for life, performs Mrityunjaya Homa at the Muth. This ritual strengthens Krishna, and Kalinga aids him in finishing off Rana and the henchmen. Finally, the Muth Pontiff arrives at the tribal village and tells Krishna that it was his destiny that he had to help the village tribal people and that he had to continue to protect them as he did in his previous birth. The Pontiff also tells him that he need not become the next successor to him nor donate any elephant to the Muth. He blesses Krishna to marry Meera (Amulya) and lead a prosperous life.

== Cast ==
- Yash in a double role as
  - Krishna
  - Bahubali
- Amulya as Meera
- Arjuna (elephant) in a double role as
  - Kalinga
  - Balarama
- Anant Nag as Pontiff of Shankara Narayana Mutt
- John Vijay as Rana
- Prabhakar as Rana's henchmen
- Shahbaz Khan as Raja Jayasurya Bahaddur
- Rangayana Raghu as Forest Officer Agni
- Sadhu Kokila as Chuncha
- Girija Lokesh as Krishna's mother
- Mandya Ramesh
- Ashok Sharma
- H. G. Dattatreya
- Shankar Ashwath
- Surya Narayan
- Srinivas Prabhu
- Rockline Sudhakar as Police Inspector
- Nagashekar as Super COP Somashekhar
- Raghavendra. B. Kolar
- Chethan
- Rajesh Nataranga as Minister
- Shivaram
- Ashok as Krishna's friend
- All Ok as Krishna's friend
- Tharun Sudhir as Manju, Bahubali's friend
- M. K. Mata
- Ramesh Pandith
- Prashanth Siddi as Beera
- Honnavalli Krishna as Forest guard
- Fayaz Khan
- Sampath J Ram

== Soundtrack ==
Gajakesari

Soundtrack album by V. Harikrishna
- Released: 11 April 2014
- Recorded: 2013
- Genre: Feature film soundtrack
- Length: 20:03
- Label: D Beats
- Producer: V. Harikrishna

The music for the film and soundtracks were composed by V. Harikrishna, with lyrics for the soundtrack penned by Yogaraj Bhat, A. P. Arjun, K. Kalyan and Pawan Wadeyar. The album has six soundtracks.

The audio launch event of Gajakesari was a low-key affair without much fanfare or stage performances. The function was held on 11 April 2014.

Track listing
No.	Title	Lyrics	Singer(s)	Length
1.	"Maneli Appa"	Yogaraj Bhat, A. P. Arjun	Baba Sehgal	4:18
2.	"Sui Tapak"	Pawan wadeyar	Krishna Iyer, Sowmya Raoh	4:11
3.	"Ishtu Divasa"	Yograj Bhat, K. Kalyan, Pawan wadeyar	Tippu	4:02
4.	"Kannada Siri"	K. Kalyan	Shankar Mahadevan, Shreya Ghoshal	4:19
5.	"Aakashavella"	K. Kalyan	Santhosh Venky	1:37
6.	"Saahore Saahore"		Chintan Vikas	1:36
Total length:				20:03

== Release and reception ==
The film released at around 150 theaters across Karnataka. It was reported that the film recovered its making cost even before the release. The satellite rights were sold at ₹4.5 crore (US$470,000). Thus, the film broke records even before the release.

=== Critical response ===
Shyam Prasad S of Bangalore Mirror wrote "You will have fun watching the film, especially with kids. Cinematographer Krishna, who makes his debut as director, knows how to present a film in all its glory though tightening the screws on the screenplay is tougher. If you have the time, this could be your Kannada film to end the long summer holidays". A critic from The Times of India scored the film at 3.5 out of 5 stars and says "It’s Yash show all the way. He has given life to his character with excellent expression and dialogue delivery in all sequences. Amulya has very little to do. Santhosh Anand Ram’s dialogues are quite interesting as they repeatedly mention about Rajkumar movies. Sachina Heggar’s costume for Yash and Amulya are good. Depi S Kumar done a perfect job in editing. Camera work by Sathya Hegde is brilliant. V Harikrishna offers a bunch of lovely tunes". A critic from Sify wrote "Gajakesari has definitely opened up to a gajakesari yoga to the film makers of the movie and has all the essence required for a blockbuster. Go get entertained this weekend with Gajakesari".

== Awards ==
Year	Award	Nominee	Work	Result	Ref
2014	Karnataka State Film Award for Best Male Playback Singer	Chintan Vikas	"Saahore Saahore"	Won	
