= Love Mocktail =

2020 film directed by Krishna

- Promotional poster
- Directed by: Darling Krishna
- Written by: Darling Krishna
- Produced by: Darling Krishna; Milana Nagaraj
- Starring: Darling Krishna; Milana Nagaraj; Amrutha Iyengar
- Cinematography: Sri Crazy Mindz
- Edited by: Sri Crazy Mindz
- Music by: Raghu Dixit
- Production company: Krishna Talkies
- Distributed by: Mysore Talkies
- Release date: 31 January 2020
- Running time: 147 minutes
- Country: India
- Language: Kannada

Love Mocktail is a 2020 Indian Kannada-language romantic drama film directed and written by Darling Krishna in his directorial debut. The film was released on 31 January 2020. The film was produced by Krishna and Milana Nagaraj, who also star in the film alongside Amrutha Iyengar. The plot follows the story of Adhi on his quest to find true love.

The film released on 31 January 2020 and received positive reviews. It became one of the most successful film of 2020. In 2022, the movie was remade in Telugu as Gurthunda Seethakalam.

== Plot ==
Adi (Darling Krishna), a software engineer, rescues Aditi (Rachana Indar) from goons. He then agrees to drop her home as he too is going to her hometown Udupi. During the journey Aditi asks Adi about his romantic history. He responds by telling her about his past, from the high school to the present.

The film flashes back to Adi's high school years, where he had a crush on a girl from his tuition, Reema (Vibha Kallianpur). His friend approaches her, but she rejects Adi, as her parents had a failed marriage. When he moved on to the engineering college, he met Joshita "Jo" (Amrutha Iyengar). She is from a well-to-do family, and even though she truly loved Adi, she had doubts about his financial ability to provide her with the lifestyle she desired. Determined to quell her doubts, Adi joins an IT company after completing school. Despite this, Jo breaks up with him due to parental pressure and his low income.

Meanwhile, Adi meets Nidhima "Nidhi" (Milana Nagaraj), a fellow software employee and a down-to-earth woman, at his workplace. After Adi is left heartbroken by Jo, his friends Vijay and Sushma set him up with Nidhi. Adi and Nidhi formed a happy couple, and Nidhi's warm nature and love changed Adi. After Jo tries to be back with Adi on her birthday, Adi realise his love for Nidhi. Adi and Nidhi get married and lead a happy, peaceful life. Then Nidhi becomes pregnant. Unfortunately, Nidhi suffers a miscarriage and loses her baby, ultimately being diagnosed with ovarian cancer. Nidhi eventually succumbs to the cancer, despite Adi's hopes that she will survive, leaving him devastated.

In the present time, Adi shows Nidhi's grave to Aditi, and the film ends with Adi driving Aditi home.

== Cast ==
- Darling Krishna as Aditya "Adi"
  - Dhanush Pranav as teenage Adi
- Milana Nagaraj as Nidhima "Nidhi", Adi's wife
- Amrutha Iyengar as Joshitha "Jo", Adi's former girlfriend
- Abhilash as Vijay, Sushma's husband
- Kushi Achar as Sushma, Vijay's wife
- Rachana Inder as Aditi
- Geetha Bharathi as Reema, Adi's teenage crush
  - Vibha Kallianpur as teenage Reema
- Ramakrishna Ganesh as Interviewer
- Vijeth Suvarna as Interviewer
- Hitesh Shah as Doctor
- Rekha Kudligi as Dr. Shantha

== Soundtrack ==
Love Mocktail

Soundtrack album by Raghu Dixit
- Released: 16 January 2020
- Recorded: 2019
- Studio: Raghu Dixit Studio
- Genre: Feature film soundtrack
- Length: 22:20
- Label: Raghu Dixit Music

Raghu Dixit chronology
Ninna Sanihake (2019)	Love Mocktail (2020)
External audio
- Official Audio Jukebox on YouTube

The soundtrack was composed by Raghu Dixit, with lyrics by Raghavendra V Kamath and Arun Kumar.

Track list
No.	Title	Lyrics	Singer(s)	Length
1.	"Oh! Oh! Love Aagoithalla"	Arun Kumar	Raghu Dixit	4:27
2.	"Love you Chinna"	Raghavendra V Kamath	Shruthi VS and Nakul Abhyankar	4:24
3.	"Janumagale Kaayuve"	Raghavendra V Kamath	Nakul Abhyankar	3:50
4.	"Kanna Haniyondhu"	Raghavendra V Kamath	Raghu Dixit	5:27
5.	"Modala Prema"	Arun Kumar	Ashwin Sharma	3:50
6.	"Neene Yendigu"	Raghavendra V Kamath	Nihal Tauro	3:32
Total length:				22.20

== Release ==
The film was released on 31 January 2020, in Karnataka and other screens in India.

=== Home media ===
The film was made available for streaming over Amazon Prime on 8 March 2020. Love Mocktail premiered on television on 29 March, on Star Suvarna.

== Remake ==
The movie is being remade in Telugu starring Tamannaah and Satyadev in the lead roles. The production will be led by Kannada director Nagashekar, who will also be co-producing the film with Bhavani Ravi. The film was titled Gurthunda Seethakalam.

== Awards and nominations ==
Award	Category	Recipient	Result	Ref.
2nd Chandanavana Film Critics Academy Awards	Best Film	Krishna; Milana Nagaraj	Nominated	
2nd Chandanavana Film Critics Academy Awards	Best Director	Krishna	Nominated	
2nd Chandanavana Film Critics Academy Awards	Best Screenplay	Krishna	Nominated	
2nd Chandanavana Film Critics Academy Awards	Best Dialogue Writer	Krishna; Milana Nagaraj	Nominated	
2nd Chandanavana Film Critics Academy Awards	Best Actor	Krishna	Nominated	
2nd Chandanavana Film Critics Academy Awards	Best Actress	Milana	Nominated	
2nd Chandanavana Film Critics Academy Awards	Best Supporting Actress	Khushi Acharya	Nominated	
2nd Chandanavana Film Critics Academy Awards	Best Supporting Actress	Amrutha Iyengar	Nominated	
2nd Chandanavana Film Critics Academy Awards	Best Child Actor	Dhanush Pranav	Nominated	
2nd Chandanavana Film Critics Academy Awards	Best Music Director	Raghu Dixit	Won	
2nd Chandanavana Film Critics Academy Awards	Best Lyrics	Raghavendra Kamath (Love you Chinna)	Nominated	
2nd Chandanavana Film Critics Academy Awards	Best Male Singer	Nakul Abhyankar (Love you Chinna)	Nominated	
2nd Chandanavana Film Critics Academy Awards	Best Female Singer	Shruthi VS (Love You Chinna)	Nominated	
2nd Chandanavana Film Critics Academy Awards	Best Cinematography	Sri Crazy mindz	Nominated	
2nd Chandanavana Film Critics Academy Awards	Best Editor	Sri Crazy mindz	Nominated	
9th South Indian International Movie Awards	Best Film	Krishna; Milana Nagaraj	Won	
9th South Indian International Movie Awards	Best Director	Krishna	Nominated	
9th South Indian International Movie Awards	Best Cinematographer	Sri Crazy Mindz	Nominated	
9th South Indian International Movie Awards	Best Actor	Krishna	Nominated	
9th South Indian International Movie Awards	Best Actress	Milana Nagaraj	Won	
9th South Indian International Movie Awards	Best Supporting Actress	Amrutha Iyengar	Won	
9th South Indian International Movie Awards	Best Music Director - Kannada	Raghu Dixit	Nominated	
9th South Indian International Movie Awards	Best Lyricist	Nakul Abhyankar	Nominated	
9th South Indian International Movie Awards	Best Female Playback Singer	Shruthi VS	Nominated	
67th Filmfare Awards South	Best Director	Darling Krishna	Nominated	
67th Filmfare Awards South	Best Actor	Darling Krishna	Nominated	
67th Filmfare Awards South	Best Actress	Milana Nagaraj	Nominated	
67th Filmfare Awards South	Critics Best Actress – Kannada	Milana Nagaraj	Won	
67th Filmfare Awards South	Best Supporting Actress	Amrutha Iyengar	Nominated	
67th Filmfare Awards South	Best Music Director	Raghu Dixit	Nominated	
67th Filmfare Awards South	Best Female Playback Singer	Shruthi VS- "Love you Chinna"	Nominated	
