= Abhishek Ambareesh =

Indian actor

- Born: 3 October 1992 (age 33); Bangalore, Karnataka, India
- Occupation: Actor
- Years active: 2019–present
- Spouse: Aviva Bidapa (m. 2023)
- Parents: Ambareesh (father); Sumalatha (mother)
- Relatives: Chowdiah (great-grandfather)

Abhishek Ambareesh (born 3 October 1992) is an Indian actor who has worked predominantly in Kannada language films. The son of actors-politicians Ambareesh and Sumalatha, Abhishek made his debut as a lead actor in the romantic action film, Amar (2019) for which he won the SIIMA Award for Best Male Debut.

== Personal life ==
Abhishek was born to Ambareesh and Sumalatha in Bangalore. Abhishek completed his master's degree in International Relations and Democratic Politics from a university in the UK. He married Aviva Bidapa, an entrepreneur, in 2023.

== Career ==
Abhishek appeared in his first lead role in the romantic action film Amar (2019) directed by Nagashekar and paired with actress Tanya Hope. The film received positive reviews from critics and audiences alike and performed best at the box office. Sunayana Suresh from The Times of India reviewed the film expressing that "Abishek Ambareesh shows he has the pedigree and promise to be someone, for he has good screen presence". In 2023, Abhishek's next release was the Duniya Suri directorial action thriller Bad Manners.

== Filmography ==
- All films are in Kannada, unless otherwise noted.

Key
†	Denotes film or TV productions that have not yet been released

Year	Film	Role	Notes	Ref
2019	Amar	Amar	SIIMA Award for Best Male Debut – Kannada	
2023	Bad Manners	Rudhra		
2025	Kaali †	TBA		
