= A Ranjith Cinema =

2023 Indian psychological thriller film

- Theatrical release poster
- Directed by: Nishanth Sattu
- Written by: Nishanth Sattu
- Produced by: Nishad Peechi; Babu Joseph Ambatt
- Starring: Asif Ali; Saiju Kurup; Anson Paul; Namitha Pramod; Hannah Reji Koshy; Jewel Mary
- Cinematography: Sunoj Velayudhan; Kunjunni S. Kumar
- Edited by: Manoj
- Music by: Midhun Asokan
- Production company: Luminous Film Factory
- Distributed by: Jupiter Pictures Release
- Release date: 8 December 2023
- Country: India
- Language: Malayalam

A Ranjith Cinema is a 2023 Indian Malayalam-language psychological thriller film written and directed by Nishanth Sattu (in his directorial debut) and co-produced by Nishad Peechi and Babu Joseph Ambatt. It stars Asif Ali in the titular role with Saiju Kurup, Namitha Pramod and Jewel Mary in other pivotal roles. The film was released on 8 December 2023.

== Plot ==
The movie is a story of the protagonist making a movie, and how the movie starts coming into his life.

Ranjith is an aspiring filmmaker working for a local TV channel for a program called ‘Taken’ where they make prank videos involving the public. In one such instance, he randomly saves Pournami, a college student, from a bunch of local youths harassing her since he was dressed as a police officer for his prank show. Sunny is a small-time businessman out for a meeting with his rich father-in-law Stephen to win the contract for a future project involving him. Stephen looks down upon Sunny since he is younger than his daughter Teena and thinks he married her and eloped only for her money. Sunny was rushing for the meeting in a bid to set his liabilities straight with the money and begin afresh but is trapped in a fake murder scenario by Ranjith's ‘Taken’ team, where they pretend to arrest Sunny on murder charges. Sunny gets late for the meeting as a result and loses the contract and is humiliated in public because of the show that aired showing him getting fooled. Enraged, he starts searching for Ranjith to get back at him. During the program Ranjith also accidentally hits and humiliates a public prosecutor who was passing by the area and got out of the car to enquire about the issue. The public prosecutor's colleague Vijay Antony is handling a high-profile harassment case where the main defendant was naming and shaming many well known people related to the case, causing them constant headaches.

Ranjith meets Pournami randomly soon after and both fall in love eventually. His mother who is a chronic asthmatic is worried of Ranjith not landing any straight jobs and wasting his time on TV programs. Once while filming Pournami with his handheld camera, he unknowingly shoots footage of Vijay getting murdered on top of a building. Her father, who is the public prosecutor who met Ranjith before, meets them once together and takes her away since he does not like their relationship. Soon after he meets a producer Shashankan to pitch his story on his latest movie set. Ranjith has based his script on his own life, casting Anson Paul and Hannah Reji Koshy as him and Pournami respectively while Kottayam Ramesh plays the role of Pournami's Dad. Whatever happened in his life with Pournami and Sunny is a part of his screenplay as well. He includes a portion where sunny barges into his office and breaks the office and their work vehicle in a fit of rage. In the story, Ranjith goes to meet Pournami after her father makes an issue, but she refuses to speak with him and walks away, only to be hit by a vehicle while crossing the road. He rushes with her to the hospital and is asked by the nurse to arrange some blood, but at the same time he receives a call from his mom, who is very sick and asking him to come soon to take her to hospital. Ranjith rushes home and brings his mother to the same hospital. After a while it is shown that a dead body is bought out by the hospital staff, but it is not shown who it is. When Sashankan asks the same, Ranjith reveals that he has only written this much of the story and is yet to decide how to conclude it. Shashankan asks him to come back quickly with a finished story so that they can move forward.

Once back from the film set, Ranjith is told by his boss Yousaf that Sunny barged into the office and bashed up the office and their vehicle, just like Ranjith had written in his film story. When things start acting out just like he has written in the story, including how Pournami's father comes to their house and threatens Ranjith's mother, he is horrified and consults a psychiatrist Chandraprakash, who assures him its just mere coincidence or random Esp and prescribes him some medicines. He also advises him to stay away from whatever circumstances mentioned in his story to prevent it from happening for real.

Sunny gets on a drinking spree and starts spiraling out of control. When some people murder Vijay Antony, they put his body inside Sunny's car boot when he was drinking in the nearby bar. When he gets arrested after making trouble, the police find the body inside the car and is arrested but is later let out when the CCTV in club premises confirmed his alibi. His wife Teena finally confronts him in his club and they both get into a fight, with Sunny slapping her and storming off. Ranjith discovers the murder footage in his camera and tries to inform Pournami's dad about it at the court, but he refuses to see Ranjith and gets him arrested for creating a nuisance. He is let go after Ranjith's mother and Yousuf pleads with ACP Dinesh Raj, much to Ranjith's horror who knows that it was Dinesh who murdered Vijay in the Video. He gives the video to his colleague on the channel. When he goes to meet Pournami, she walks away just like in his story and is hit by Teena's car when she is leaving the club. After taking her to hospital, he immediately goes home to check on his mother, but finds Dinesh Raj and his goons there. He has come in search of Ranjith since Ranjith's colleague aired the video on their channel exposing Dinesh and has credited the video to Ranjith. A fight ensues and he finally subdues everyone and takes his mother to hospital. Pournami and his mother survive, and he makes the movie with a happy ending. Sunny acts in the movie in his namesake role and finally patches up with his father-in-law who approves of his celebrity status now. After the movie release, Ranjith comes to meet Pournami as she is getting discharged.

== Cast ==
- Asif Ali as Ranjith Das
- Saiju Kurup as Sunny
- Namitha Pramod as Pournami
- Renji Panicker as Rajashekaran Menon,Pournami's father, a public prosecutor
- Jewel Mary as Teena, Sunny's wife
- Sabitha Anand as Latha, Ranjith's mother
- Krishna as ACP Dinesh Raj IPS
- Harisree Ashokan as Shashankan, Film Producer
- Jayaprakash as Stephen, Teena's father
- Anson Paul as himself
  - Portrays the role of Ranjith in the semi-biographical film directed by the latter.
- Hannah Reji Koshy as herself
  - Portrays the role of Pournnami in the film directed by Ranjith.
- Kottayam Ramesh as himself
  - Portrays the role of Pournnami's father in the film directed by Ranjith
- Shobha Mohan as herself
  - Portrays the role of Ranjith's mother in the film directed by Ranjith.
- Kalabhavan Navas as Yousaf, a senior producer at New Vision Channel and Ranjith's friend
- Aju Varghese as Murugan
- Balachandra Menon as Chandraprakash, a psychiatrist consulted by Ranjith
- Balachandran Chullikkad as Asst. Public Prosecutor Vijay Antony
- Poojappura Radhakrishnan as Babu, Public Prosecutor's Personal Assistant
- Jassie Gift as a car passenger who is asked for help by Ranjith.

== Release ==
The film was released in theatres on 8 December 2023.

== Reception ==
=== Critical response ===
The film received negative reviews from critics.

Sanjith Sidhardhan of OTTPlay gave 3 out of 5 stars and wrote, "Though A Ranjith Cinema takes some time to find its footing, the makers deserve credit for attempting a movie that has enough interesting elements to keep the audience hooked."
