= Aadi (2005 film) =

2005 Kannada romance film

- Directed by: M. S. Ramesh
- Written by: M. S. Ramesh
- Produced by: Jai Jagadish; Vijayalakshmi Singh
- Starring: Auditya; Ramya; Avinash
- Cinematography: Dasari Seenu
- Edited by: S Manohar
- Music by: Gurukiran
- Production company: Lakshmi Entertainers Pvt Ltd.
- Release date: 4 March 2005
- Running time: 147 min
- Country: India
- Language: Kannada

Aadi is an Indian 2005 Kannada-language romance film written and directed by M. S. Ramesh and starring Aditya and Ramya. The film was produced by Aditya's uncle and aunt, Jai Jagadish and Vijayalakshmi Singh.

== Cast ==
- Adithya as Aadi
- Ramya as Aishwarya
- Srinagar Kitty as Manoj
- Avinash as Udayachandar
- Srinivasa Murthy
- Rangayana Raghu
- Shobaraj as Suryakanth
- Vijaynagar Kitti
- Sundar Raj
- Sathyajith as Sathya
- Dharma

== Production ==
The film was launched at Kanteerava Studios. Distributor Paul Chandani switched on the camera while Subrahmanya clapped the first shot. The film was shot at the Mysore Lamp campus.

== Soundtrack ==
All the songs were composed and scored by Gurukiran.

Song No.	Title	Singer(s)	Lyricist
1	"Rangeela Rangeela"	Gurukiran	Kaviraj
2	"Elle Iru Neenu"	Gurukiran, Nanditha	V. Manohar
3	"Hele O Gelathi"	Udit Narayan, Nanditha	Kaviraj
4	"Neene Nanna Dreamali"	Vidya	Kaviraj
5	"Enu Majaano"	Gurukiran	Bhangi Ranga

== Critical reception ==
Film critic R. G. Vijayasarathy of IANS wrote that "If the director had given some thought to the narration and worked out a tight script, the film could have appealed to the youth". A reviewer of Deccan Herald wrote "Auditya is good and has also shown that he can fight. Colourful cinematography and catchy dialogues are other plus points of the film". Sify wrote "There are too many drawbacks in the film directed by M.S.Ramesh. The characterization and presentation is not up to the mark and the film has a wafer thin story laced with poor songs tuned by Guru Kiran."
