= Bad Manners (2023 film) =

2023 Kannada film directed by Duniya Suri

- Directed by: Duniya Suri
- Screenplay by: Amri; Duniya Suri; Maasthi Upparahalli
- Story by: Amri; Surendranath
- Produced by: Sudhir K. M.
- Starring: Abhishek Ambareesh; Rachita Ram
- Cinematography: Shekar S.
- Edited by: Deepu S. Kumar
- Music by: Charan Raj
- Production company: Studio 18
- Distributed by: Jayanna Films
- Release date: 24 November 2023
- Country: India
- Language: Kannada

Bad Manners is a 2023 Indian Kannada-language action crime film directed by Duniya Suri. The film stars Abhishek Ambareesh, Rachita Ram, Tara, Sharath Lohithaswa, H. G. Dattatreya, Trivikram and Rochit Shetty. The soundtrack and background score is composed by Charan Raj, while the cinematography and editing are handled by Shekhar S. and Deepu. S. Kumar.

Bad Manners was released on 24 November 2023 to mixed reviews from critics.

== Premise ==
Rudhra, a cop, loses his service revolver at a crime scene and sets out to retrieve the gun to avoid suspension. Rudhra goes to Govardhana Ghada, a place known for making illegal weaponry, in order to retrieve his revolver, but he soon creates serious problems with the gangsters due to his behaviour.

== Cast ==
- Abhishek Ambareesh as Rudhresh "Rudhra"
- Rachita Ram as Veena
- Priyanka Kumar
- Tara as Lakshmamma
- Sharath Lohithaswa as ACP Gangadhar
- Trivikram as Phoenix
- Rochit Shetty as Magayi
- H. G. Dattatreya
- Kuri Prathap as Muniraju
- Poornachandra Mysore as Gunnis
- Niranjan
- Chandu

== Production ==
=== Development ===
Duniya Soori announced the film with Abhishek Ambareesh, Rachita Ram and Priyanka titled Bad Manners. The film will be produced by Sudhir K. M. under Studio 18 banner. The film began its shooting in January 2021.

=== Filming ===
The filming begun in January 2021 at the Mandya Sugar Factory. Due to the COVID-19 pandemic, filming was delayed for approximately a year. The production later resumed on 14 February 2022 and filming was completed on 22 February 2023, coinciding with Maha Shivaratri.

== Soundtrack ==
Bad Manners

Soundtrack album by Charan Raj
- Released: 2023
- Recorded: 2023
- Genre: Feature film soundtrack
- Label: Anand Audio

Charan Raj chronology
Sapta Saagaradaache Ello - Side B (2023)	Bad Manners (2023)	Bheema (2023)

Charan Raj composed the background score and soundtrack for the film. The soundtrack album comprises four tracks and audio rights were secured by Anand Audio.

Track listing
No.	Title	Singer(s)	Length
1.	"Bad Manners Title Track"	Usha Uthup	3:30
2.	"Saraayi Kududre Jhum Anthade"	M. S. Umesh	3:10
3.	"Oga Oga"	Kapil Kapilan; Narayan Sharma	3:29
4.	"I'm in Love"	Charanraj	2:30
5.	"Jeeva"	Siddhant Sundar; Charanraj	3:07
Total length:			15:46

== Marketing ==
The teaser of the film was released on 4 October 2022, while the trailer was unveiled on 12 November 2023 by Darshan.

== Release ==
Bad Manners was released on 24 November 2023.

== Reception ==
=== Critical response ===
Sridevi. S of The Times of India gave 3/5 stars and wrote "Bad Manners is raw, rugged and an absolute mix-masala one can only expect from Suri!." Shashiprasad S. M. of The South First gave 3/5 stars and wrote "Though there are no “wow… so elegant, and beautiful” moments in Bad Manners, Suri's style of making and the renewed version of Abhishek Ambareesh as an actor makes this a worthy watch."

A. Sharadhaa of The New Indian Express gave 3/5 stars and wrote "For fans of Suri’s distinctive style and those open to witnessing Abhishek Ambareesh in a different light, this film is a must-watch for action enthusiasts. However, a disclaimer about the portrayal of country-made guns in Bad Manners is essential. Approach it purely as a film experience." Swaroop Kodur of OTTplay gave 2.5/5 stars and wrote "Bad Manners is a Suri film, no doubt, but this one's far from his best work. As pointed out, the lack of emotional depth in the narrative defeats the film and the filmmaker tries his best to salvage it with the help of some slick action sequences and his unique worldview and making."

Vivek M. V. of The Hindu wrote "Suri’s ‘Bad Manners,’ begins with a gripping portrayal of a town known for making guns, but the actioner soon fizzles out owing to shoddy writing."
