= Satya Hegde =

Indian cinematographer (born 1975)

- Born: 17 May 1975 (age 51); Haliyal, Uttara Kannada, Karnataka, India
- Occupation: Cinematographer
- Years active: 2002–present

Satya Hegde (born 17 May 1975) is an Indian cinematographer who works in Kannada cinema. He made his debut with Taali Kattuva Shubhavele in 2002. Following this, he worked in over 20 films and received critical praise for his work in Duniya (2007) and Myna (2013), along with his collaborations with Suri.

== Early life ==
Satya Hegde was born on 17 May 1975 to Parameshwar Hegde and Savithri in Haliyal, Uttara Kannada, Karnataka. He completed his schooling from Carmel High School, Haliyal in 1989. Following this, he was sent to Sanduru to complete his Pre-university course by his father who then wanted him to pursue a career in Computer science. Due to his poor scores during the course, he was persuaded by his brother to obtain a diploma. Having decided to choose cinematography as the subject specialization at the Sri Jayachamarajendra Polytechnic, Bangalore, Hegde obtained the diploma in cinematography in 1995.

== Career ==
Hegde began his career as a cinematographer assisting B. C. Gowrishankar, a popular cinematographer of the time. He also assisted Ashok Kashyap, P. Rajan, H. C. Venu, P. K. H. Das, Surendranath Begur, and Krishna. During the time, he worked in making corporate videos, documentary films, television advertisements and in soap operas such as Ankura and Swarnarekhe. He worked as a camera operator and an assistant cinematographer in the Kannada language films Sparsha (2000), Parva (2002) and H2O. In the same year, he started out as an independent cinematographer in films with the film Taali Kattuva Shubhavele. He then worked in the 2005 releases Yashwanth and Masala, both of which failed to perform commercially. Following this, Hegde worked with Ashok Kashyap in a soap opera before returning to films with the 2007 film Duniya for which he won praise for his work from critics.

His work in Myna (2013), that was shot mostly outdoors with simulated lighting won him praise. He then worked in Gajakesari (2014) collaborating with Krishna, a cinematographer himself, as the director. He received praise for his work in Rhaatee, with critics calling it a "visual poetry"; it involved frames of Bangalore and Muthathi forest. For his work in Rhaatee, he was awarded the Best Cinematographer at the 2014 Karnataka State Film Awards.

== Filmography ==
Year	Film	Director	Notes
2000	Sparsha	Sunil Kumar Desai	Assistant cinematographer
2002	Parva	Sunil Kumar Desai	Assistant cinematographer
2002	H2O	N. Lokanath; Rajaram	Assistant cinematographer
2002	Thali Kattuva Shubhavele	Robjn Gurang	
2005	Yashwanth	Dayal Padmanabhan	
2005	Masala	Dayal Padmanabhan	
2007	Duniya	Duniya Suri	Suvarna Film Award for Best Cinematographer; Kasturi Film Award for Best Cinematographer; Cinegandha Award for Best Cinematographer
2007	Ee Preethi Onthara	Subramanya Thememane	
2008	Inthi Ninna Preethiya	Duniya Suri	
2009	Ambari	A. P. Arjun	
2009	Junglee	Duniya Suri	
2009	Manasaare	Yogaraj Bhat	Zee Kannada Film Award for Best Cinematographer; Innovative Film Award for Best Cinematographer
2009	Gokula	Prakash	
2010	Jackie	Duniya Suri	Suvarna Film Award for Best Cinematographer
2011	Sanju Weds Geetha	Nagashekar	SIIMA Award for Best Cinematographer
2011	Hudugaru	K. Madesh	
2012	Shiva	Om Prakash Rao	
2012	Anna Bond	Duniya Suri	Nominated—SIIMA Award for Best Cinematographer
2013	Myna	Nagashekar	Nominated—SIIMA Award for Best Cinematographer
2014	Gajakesari	Krishna	Nominated—SIIMA Award for Best Cinematographer
2014	6-5=2	Bharat Jain	
2015	Rhaatee	A. P. Arjun	Karnataka State Film Award for Best Cinematographer
2015	Aatagara	K. M. Chaitanya	
2015	Kendasampige	Duniya Suri	
2016	Doddmane Hudga	Duniya Suri	
2016	U Turn	Pawan Kumar	
2017	Maasthi Gudi	Nagashekar	
2019	Amar	Nagashekar	
2020	Butterfly	Ramesh Aravind	
2020	Paris Paris	Ramesh Aravind	Tamil film
2020	Act 1978	Mansore	
2021	100	Ramesh Aravind	
2024	Martin	A. P. Arjun	
2025	Sanju Weds Geetha 2	Nagashekar	
2025	Ekka	Rohit Padaki	
2025	45	Arjun Janya	
