= Midhun Asokan =

Indian music composer

Midhun Asokan is an Indian music producer, programmer and composer who predominantly works in South Indian Film Industry. He is the music composer for Asif Ali starrer Malayalam Cinema named A Ranjith Cinema, background score composer of Kannada movie Veeram and upcoming movie Ranaraksasa. He has been the music producer and programmer for more than 600 feature films in Malayalam, Tamil and Telugu film Industry. He was the programmer for songs in the movie Bhayanakam composed by M. K. Arjunan, which won the Kerala State Film Award for Best Composer.

== Career ==
He started his music career from 2006 doing programming for the music composer C. Rajamani for the movie Chinthamani Kolacase. He has worked as music producer or programmer for C Rajamani, Vidyasagar, Deepak Dev, M Jayachandran, Bijibal, Jakes Bejoy etc. for over 600 feature films.

== Personal life ==
He is the grandson of Indian film music composer M. K. Arjunan.

== Filmography ==
=== As music composer ===
Year	Film	Language	Notes
2023	A Ranjith Cinema	Malayalam	
2023	Veeram	Kannada	background score composer credited as Mr M
2023	Ranarakshasa	Kannada	
