= Mathe Mungaru =

- Poster
- Directed by: Raghav (Dwarki)
- Written by: Raghav (Dwarki)
- Produced by: E. Krishnappa
- Starring: Srinagar Kitty; Rachana Malhothra
- Cinematography: Sundarnath Suvarna
- Edited by: K. M. Prakash
- Music by: X. Paulraj
- Release date: 5 August 2010
- Running time: 138 minutes
- Country: India
- Language: Kannada

Mathe Mungaru is a 2010 Indian Kannada-language drama film written and directed by Raghav. It stars Srinagar Kitty and Rachana Malhothra. The film released to positive reviews but went unnoticed at the box office.

== Plot ==
Mathe Mungaru tells the true-life story of Narayana Mandhagadde, a man from Shivamogga district in Karnataka who served 21 years in prison in Pakistan. He returned home in 2003 with the intervention of the former prime minister Atal Bihari Vajpayee.

== Cast ==
- Srinagara Kitty as Narayan "Nani"
- Rachana Malhothra as Thara
- Roopadevi
- Ravishankar Gowda
- Achyuth Kumar
- Sushma Bharadwaj
- Muni
- Neenasam Aswath
- Enagi Nataraj
- Silli Lalli Anand
- Kurigalu Prakash
- Lokesh
- Praveen
- Ravikanth
- Dwarki
- Mateen Hussain

== Production ==
The story is based on Narayana Mandagadde, an Indian prisoner who was held captive in Pakistan for twenty-one years. 11 actors including Srinagara Kitty shaved their heads for their roles in the film.

Although initially hesitant, Asha Bhosle agreed to sing a song for the film in Mumbai, marking her comeback to the Kannada industry after 37 years. Upon recording, difficult Kannada words were replaced with easier ones. The song was recorded in January 2010. A month later, after both the crew had Bhosle mistakenly release a statement denoting that the song was her Kannada debut after Veer Samarth stated that another song she recorded was her debut.

== Soundtrack ==
The music of the movie is composed by X. Paulraj, with lyrics by Dwarki Raghava, except where noted.

- "Chita Pata Pata" - Karthik, Shreya Ghoshal
- "Helade Kaarana" - Asha Bhosle
- "Summaniruva Ee Manasinali" - Ranjith
- "Belagayitu" - Hariharan (lyrics : V. Nagendra Prasad)
- "Kangalu Kanalive" - Karthikeyan
- "Hey Janmabhoomi" - Vijay Prakash, K. S. Chithra

== Reception ==
A critic from the IANS rated the film three out of five stars and wrote, "‘Mathe Mungaru’ is a very honest attempt backed by good efforts. If only Dwarki had worked on some details and polished his script, the film could have been much better".
