= Srinagara Kitty =

Indian actor (born 1977)

- Born: Krishna; 8 July 1977 (age 49); Bangalore, India
- Other names: Abhay, Krishna
- Occupation: Actor
- Spouse: Bhavana Belagere

Krishna (born 8 July 1977) known by his stage name Srinagara Kitty, is an Indian actor who primarily works in Kannada television series and films. He started off as a child artist working in a host of television serialized dramas before making his film debut in 2003 Chandra Chakori.

His first major film as a lead actor was Inthi Ninna Preethiya (2008) which opened to positive reviews with his performance being noted. Following this, he featured in many feature films, notably Mathe Mungaru (2010), Savari (2009), Hudugaru (2011) and Sanju Weds Geetha (2011). The success of these films recognized him as one of the best actors in Kannada cinema.

== Family and early background ==
Kitty comes from a joint family where he is the last child born to his parents. He is married to TV producer Bhavana Belegere and is the son-in-law of noted writer, journalist and TV Presenter Ravi Belagere.

== Career ==
=== Television ===
He started his career early as a Child artist with TV serials like – Malanadina Chitragalu, Doddamane, Kandana Kavya among many others. During this time, he was even active in stage plays and acted in plays like Kaadu, Kappe Bhavi Nakshatra, Akka, Namma Nimmagalobba, Sanje Mallige.

Post his education, he starred TV serials for ETV, Udaya and Suvarna – prominent among them being, Chandrika, Preethigagi, Ananda Sagara, Mane Mane Kathe and Bhoomi.

=== Films ===
Kitty made his debut in films with the 2003 Kannada film Chandra Chakori, in which he appeared in a negative role. He then appeared in negative roles with films like Gowdru, Love Story, Aadhi, Ayya and Vishnusena most of which releases in the year 2005.

He made his debut in a lead role in Giri and followed it with Inthi Ninna Preethiya which gave him stardom. He then appeared in Olave Jeevana Lekkachaara, Janumada Gelathi, Mathe Mungaru, Savari, Male Barali Manju Irali, Swayamvara, Sanju Weds Geetha and Hudugaru, all of which saw moderate success with Sanju Weds Geetha and Hudugaru seeing success at the box-office. His performance in Savari won him the Filmfare Special Jury Award.

In 2014, Kitty appeared in a triple role in the film Bahuparak and also sang the song "Simple Preethige" for the film.

== Filmography ==
=== As actor ===
Key
†	Denotes films that have not yet been released

Year	Film	Role	Notes
2003	Chandra Chakori	Mahesh	
2004	Abbabba Entha Huduga		
2004	Gowdru	Nanjunda	
2005	Ayya		
2005	Aadi	Manoj	
2005	Giri	Giri	
2005	Love Story		
2005	Vishnu Sena	Gopi	
2006	Iruvar Mattum	Azhagu Sundaram	Tamil film Credited as Abhay
2008	Inthi Ninna Preethiya	Rajeeva	Credited as Krishna
2008	Janumada Gelathi	Gowri Shankar	
2009	Savari	Gaali Seenu	Won—Filmfare Special Award – South
2009	Olave Jeevana Lekkachaara	Balachandra "Balu"	
2009	Male Barali Manju Irali	Vishwas	
2010	Swayamvara	Ajay	
2010	Mathe Mungaru	Narayan "Nani"	
2011	Sanju Weds Geetha	Sanjay "Sanju"	
2011	Hudugaru	Chandru	Nominated, Filmfare Award for Best Supporting Actor - Kannada
2011	Panchamrutha	Purushottam	
2012	Ko Ko	Kitty	
2012	Kilady Kitty	Kitty	
2013	Tony	Tony	Also co-producer
2013	Appayya	Appayya	
2013	Kariya Kanbitta		Special appearance
2014	Savaari 2	Srinivas "Seenu"	
2014	Paru Wife of Devadas	Deva	
2014	Bahuparak	Manas, Mani & Mouni	Triple role
2014	Namaste Madam	Nanda Gopal	
2016	Whatsupp Love		Special appearance
2017	Siliconn City	Sanjay	
2022	Avatara Purusha	Kumara	
2022	Garuda	ACP Sampath	
2023	Gowli	Gowli	
2023	Veeram	Narasimha	
2024	Avatara Purusha 2	Kumara	
2025	Sanju Weds Geetha 2	Sanjay "Sanju"	
2025	Maadeva	Samudra	
2026	Terror	Bharath Das	
2026	Veshagalu †	Basappa / Basamma	Filming
2026	Buddhivantha 2 †		Post-production

=== Cameo appearance ===
Year	Film	Role	Notes
2011	I Am Sorry Mathe Banni Preethsona		
2012	Ball Pen		Also co-producer
2013	Simple Agi Ondh Love Story	Love Guru	
2013	Bhajarangi	Himself	Special appearance in song "Bossu Nam Bossu"
2014	Nan Life Alli		
2014	Adyaksha	Himself	Special appearance in song "Phonu Illa"
2015	Buguri	Karthik	
2015	Abhinetri		
2015	Ring Road		
2016	Whatsapp Love		
2016	Happy Birthday		
