= Chirag Jani (actor) =

Indian film actor

- Born: 14 August 1987 (age 38); Kodinar, Gujarat, India
- Occupation: actor

Chirag Jani is an Indian actor who has appeared in Tamil, Telugu, Gujarati, Hindi and Malayalam language films. He made his acting debut in the Hindi serial Sapne Suhane Ladakpan Ke, along with Vaishnavi Mahant, directed by Rajesh Babbar and produced by Shyamashish Bhattacharya. His performances in many films were applauded, especially in Yahan Ameena Bikti Hai, directed by Kumar Raj. Chirag played as Sindhura in the devotional TV show Vighnaharta Ganesha. He has also acted in television series like Porus (as the Dasyu King Arunayak) and Dastaan-E-Mohabbat Salim Anarkali (as Mirza Muhammad Hakim).

Chirag has recently appeared as the villain in Kaappaan, an action thriller directed by K. V. Anand. He starred in the Gujarati film G.

== Filmography ==
Key
†	Denotes films that have not yet been released

Year	Title	Role	Language
2017	Rogue	Chirag	Kannada; Telugu
2019	Kaappaan	Ranjith Kumar	Tamil
2020	G	ACP Samrat	Gujarati
2021	Krack	Saleem Bhatkal / Satyanaraya Murthy	Telugu
2022	Nayika Devi: The Warrior Queen		Gujarati
2022	Dhamaka	Atharva Pakshitap	Telugu
2023	Thunivu	Harsha	Tamil
2023	Agilan	Inspector S. Gokul Mehta	Tamil
2023	Veeram		Kannada
2024	Sasan	Vikram	Gujarati
2024	The E-Ghost	Veer	Hindi
2025	Shanmukha	Viganda	Telugu
2026	Draupathi 2	Muhammad bin Tughluq	Tamil; Telugu
2026	Prathichaya	Sukesh Pandey	Malayalam

=== Television ===
- Sapne Suhane Ladakpan Ke as Jagan (2013)
- Porus as Dasyu king Arunayak (2017–2018)
- Vighnaharta Ganesha as Lord Shiva
- Dastaan-E-Mohabbat Salim Anarkali as Hakim Mirza (2018)
