= Amar (2019 film) =

2019 film by Nagashekar

- Thearetical Poster
- Directed by: Nagashekar
- Screenplay by: Nagashekar
- Story by: Nagashekar
- Produced by: Sandesh Nagaraj
- Starring: Abhishek Ambareesh; Tanya Hope; Devaraj; Sudharani
- Cinematography: Satya Hegde
- Edited by: Srikanth Gowda
- Music by: Arjun Janya
- Production company: Sandesh Productions
- Release date: 31 May 2019
- Country: India
- Language: Kannada

Amar is a 2019 Indian Kannada romantic action film directed by Nagashekar and produced by Sandesh Nagaraj under Sandesh Productions banner. The film stars Abhishek Ambareesh, making his acting debut and Tanya Hope in the lead roles. The supporting cast includes Devaraj, Sudharani, Chikkanna and Sadhu Kokila. Actor Darshan features in a guest role besides Anup Bhandari and Rachita Ram in special appearances.

The principal photography began on 28 May 2018 and the filming is set to be held in and around Bengaluru and Switzerland.

== Plot ==
Amarnath (Abhishek), a happy-go-lucky youth, lives with his father (Deepak Shetty) and mother. Amar befriends Bobby then joins her and her team on the Saving Nature mission and eventually falls in love with her.

Bobby's father (Devaraj) decides to marry her to a businessman, Darshan's brother (Anup Bhandari). Amar breaks up with her, she leaves him heartbroken. After some years, he finds her and tries to convince her. In the climax, they reunite with the help of Darshan.

== Cast ==
- Abhishek Ambareesh as Amar
- Tanya Hope as Bobby
- Devaraj as Bobby's father
- Sudharani as Amar's mother
- Sadhu Kokila as Amar's uncle
- Chikkanna as Amar's friend
- Raj Deepak Shetty as Amar's father
- Arun Sagar as Devaraj's aide
- Baby Sameksha as Paapu
- Darshan as Arun Subbiah in a special appearance
- Nirup Bhandari as Varun Subbiah in a special appearance in "Joru Paattu"
- Arjun Janya in a special appearance in "Joru Paattu"
- Rachita Ram in a guest appearance in the song "Joru Paattu"

== Production ==
The film marked the acting debut of Abhishek, son of Ambareesh. The filming was held in Bengaluru and Switzerland.

== Soundtrack ==
Arjun Janya is set to compose the score and soundtrack for the film. Reportedly, the title song of Abhishek's father Ambareesh starrer Olavina Udugore (1987) has been recreated in the film. The song "Marethuhoyithe" shot in Switzerland was a huge hit and was choreographed by B. Dhananjay.

No.	Title	Singer(s)	Length
1.	"Marethuhoyithe"	Sanjith Hegde
2.	"Summane Heege Ninnane"	Shreya Ghoshal, Sonu Nigam
3.	"Onde Aetige"	Shreya Ghoshal, Armaan Malik
4.	"Joru Paattu"	Jassie Gift
5.	"Kambani"	Shreya Ghoshal, Sonu Nigam

== Release ==
The film was released in 300 theatres across Karnataka. The film received negative reviews from critics and audiences alike and performed average.
