= Vishnu Sena =

- DVD Cover
- Directed by: Naganna
- Written by: R. G. Vijayasarathy (Dialogues)
- Screenplay by: A. R. Murugadass
- Story by: A. R. Murugadass
- Based on: Ramanaa
- Produced by: M. Govinda
- Starring: Vishnuvardhan; Ramesh Aravind; Gurleen Chopra
- Cinematography: Ramesh Babu
- Edited by: S. Manohar
- Music by: Deva
- Production company: Sri Hrudayeshwari Films
- Distributed by: Ramu Enterprises
- Release date: 23 December 2005
- Running time: 168 minutes
- Country: India
- Language: Kannada

Vishnu Sena is a 2005 Indian Kannada-language vigilante action drama film directed by Naganna and produced by M. Govinda. The film stars Vishnuvardhan along with Ramesh Aravind, Gurleen Chopra and Lakshmi Gopalaswamy in prominent roles. The music was composed by Deva. It is a remake of 2002 Tamil film Ramanaa.

The film released on 23 December 2005 to positive reviews from critics and audience.

== Premise ==
The film is the story of Professor. Jayasimha, who creates awareness among the public about corruption and his operation to curb the people who are responsible for the society.

== Cast ==
- Vishnuvardhan as Prof. Jayasimha
- Ramesh Aravind as Ramesh, police jeep driver
- Gurleen Chopra as Devaki, social worker
- Lakshmi Gopalaswamy as Chitra, Jayasimha's wife (Guest appearance)
- Niharika N. as Priya, daughter of Prof. Jayasimha
- Ashutosh Rana as Badrinath
- Ananth Nag as Chief Minister
- Pankaj Dheer as DCP Samarjith singh
- Doddanna as Gangadharaiah
- Kishore as Badrinath's son, MD of Modern Hospital
- Srinivasa Murthy as Judge
- Girija Lokesh
- M. N. Lakshmi Devi
- B. Jaya
- Tennis Krishna as Government office peon
- Srinagar Kitty as Gopi, member in Vishnusena
- Sathyajith as Sathyajith, an officer
- Tharun Sudhir
- Hemanth G. Nag
- Sandeep Singh
- Bangalore Nagesh
- M. S. Umesh
- Karthik Sharma
- Narendra Babu Sharma
- Venu

== Production ==
The muhurat of the film took place on 27 May 2005. This marks the second film of producer M. Govinda after Anjali Geethanjali (2001). Part of the film was shot in Chennai.

== Soundtrack ==
The music of the film was composed by Deva. The song "History Gotha" is based on "Ekkado Putti" from Student No: 1.

Vishnu Sena

Soundtrack album by Deva
- Released: 2005
- Genre: Feature film soundtrack
- Label: Akash Audio

No.	Title	Lyrics	Singer(s)	Length
1.	"Abhimanigale Nanna"	K. Kalyan	Vishnuvardhan	4:54
2.	"History Gottha"	Upendra	S. P. Balasubrahmanyam	6:26
3.	"Meghave Meghave"	V. Nagendra Prasad	S. P. Balasubrahmanyam, Anuradha Sriram	5:19
4.	"Benki Kaddi Hacchi"	V. Nagendra Prasad	S. P. Balasubrahmanyam, K. S. Chithra	6:05
5.	"O Deva Neenilli"	Aadarsha	Shankar Mahadevan	5:45
Total length:				28:29

== Reception ==
Indiaglitz wrote "It is not an easy task to direct this kind of remake. The requirement of manpower and shrewd thinking is a must. Director Naganna has applied his brain properly. Producer Govindu has made this one a lavish scale". Deepak DN of Deccan Herald wrote "The storyline is thin. But it has been told through different episodes which appeal to the audience".
