= S. Krishna =

Indian cinematographer and film director (born 1975)

Krishna
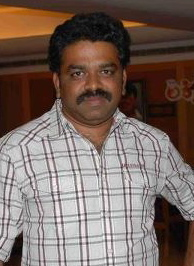
- Born: 9 June 1975 (age 50); Bangalore, Karnataka, India
- Occupations: Cinematographer, film director, producer
- Years active: 1998–present
- Spouse: Swapna (m. 2005)
- Children: 3

S. Krishna is an Indian cinematographer and film director who primarily works in Kannada cinema. He gave a new dimension to cinematography through his visuals in Mungaru Male. He's an alumnus of the Government Film and Television Institute, Bangalore.

== Career ==
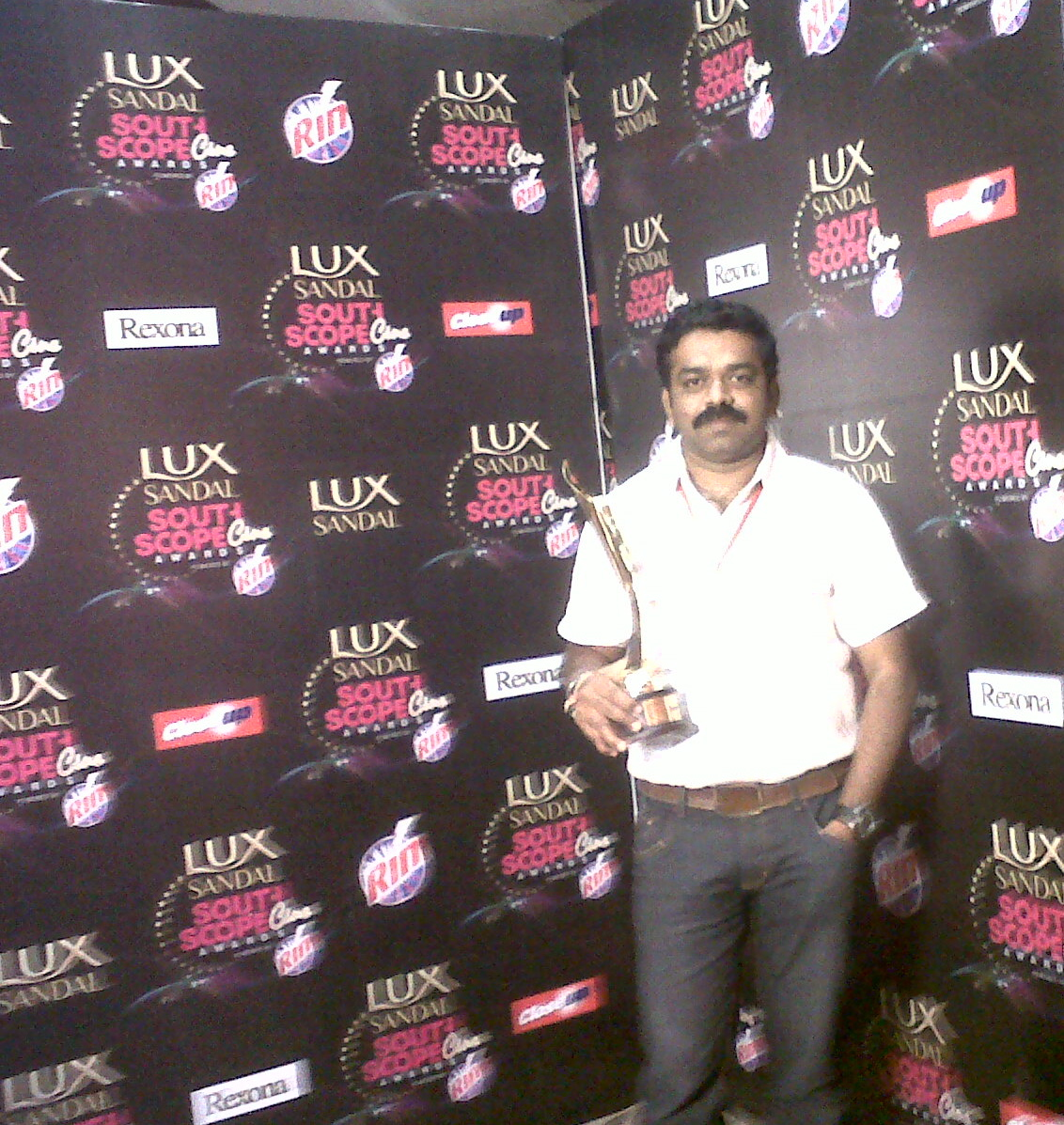
Krishna at South Scope Awards 2009

Krishna's cinematography impressed people and the critics, but he didn't come into his own until he did the challenging Mungaaru Male. The film was shot in 80% natural rain, which is generally not cinematography-friendly. It also needed to be shot in other precarious conditions – like the dangerous, rocky top of the Jog Falls. Krishna took up the challenge and did the job admirably. The film was a box office success, and one of the major contributors to its success was Krishna's cinematography. He was duly recognized by the Karnataka State Government when they named him the Best Cinematographer for 2006. According to Yogaraj Bhat, the director of the film, the cinematographer was his partner-in-crime for all risky and foolhardy propositions. Krishna maintains that since he had complete freedom to do as he liked, he could deliver his best.

After Mungaaru Male, Krishna went on to do a film with debutant director Harsha.A. Geleya did not have much scope for experimentation cinematographically, but the film's most popular track (Ee Sanje Yaakaagide), which was shot in slow motion, was the highlight of the film. Krishna did Haage Summane next, for Preetam Gubbi, one of the main collaborators in the film Mungaaru Male. Since then, he's the most frequent collaborator for all of Preetam Gubbi's films.

He also served as cinematographer for Raaj the Showman, directed by Prem and starring Puneeth Rajkumar and Priyanka Kothari. However, the critics were not impressed with the film; all applauded Krishna's work. He then worked for Kempegowda, a Kannada remake of Tamil Blockbuster Singham, which starred Sudeep in the lead and directed by himself. Krishna had collaborated with Sudeep for the second time, after Ranga SSLC which starred Sudeep in the lead. The movie showed the hidden talented side of Krishna, who had experimented a lot in the movie and took the technicalities to another level. 'Supergoodmovies' praised his work as "the camerawork stands out in the technical department. Krishna, who is otherwise known for wielding a camera for mushy love stories, does an excellent job in this action film. For a change, fights using safety cords look real. Krishna shows his ability in song sequences".

Krishna was supposed to work with Yograj Bhat for Lagori, starring Puneeth Rajkumar, but the project was dropped. In 2012, they collaborated on the film Drama starring Yash and Radhika Pandit. Naturally, the whole film industry's eyes were on him, expecting to recreate the magic of Mungaru Male along with Yogaraj Bhat.

Drama was released in November to the most positive reviews from critics and audiences alike. The movie was a blockbuster of 2012 and it garnered rave reviews for Krishna for his work from all over the country. IBN Live praised his work as "The film's highlight is the remarkable camerawork of S Krishna, who is arguably one of the country's top directors of photography. Indiaglitz quoted his work as "S Krishna in his comeback after 'Mungaru Male' in the direction of Yogaraj Bhat has no flaws."

He then collaborated with Duniya Soori for Kaddipudi starring Shivrajkumar and Radhika Pandit.

=== Gajakesari and afterwards ===
When he was at the peak of his career as a cinematographer he challenged himself to be a director. He directed Gajakesari starring Yash which broke all of the previous records of Yash thereby catapulting him as the next big star in the Kannada film industry. Gajakesari even won the Karnataka State Film Award for Best Entertaining Film of the Year 2014.

After this, Gajakesari Krishna took a break to work on his next project titled Hebbuli. Many big names of the industry were considered for the project like Darshan, Sudeep, Puneeth Rajkumar, Yash, etc. Sudeep liked the script so much that he gave his consent to work on the project. Hebbuli brings back the successful duo of Maanikya, Ravichandran, and Sudeep. Therefore, the expectations were riding very high on Hebbuli. The principal photography of the film is expected to start in April after Sudeep completes his shoot for K.S.Ravikumar's next.

Krishna recently wrapped up his portions of the shoot as a cinematographer for Dwarakish's 50th production named Chowka. He's one of the 5 cinematographers for the film which is being directed by debutant Tharun Sudhir, brother of famous director Nanda Kishore.

Hebbuli was released on 23 February 2017. It had the best opening in Sudeep's career. Impressed with Krishan's talents Sudeep agreed to do one more project with the director. The project was named as Pailwaan. It was produced by the director himself under his home production house RRR Motion Pictures. Pailwaan was released in multiple languages, in Kannada, Hindi, Tamil, Telugu, and Malayalam. It had the biggest release in Sudeep's career. But the collections were hugely affected due to piracy. It was declared a super hit.

Now after the massive success of Pailwaan, Krishna is gearing up for his next. The project is unnamed as of now and has been delayed due to COVID-19 pandemic.

== Personal life ==
Krishna is married to a well known Kannada television actress Swapna. He currently resides with his wife and three children in Bangalore.

== Filmography ==
Key
†	Denotes films that have not yet been released

=== As director ===
Year	Film	Creadited as			Notes
Year	Film	Director	Writer	Producer	Notes
2014	Gajakesari	Yes	No	No	nominated Filmfare Award for Best Director – Kannada; won Karnataka State Film Award for Best Entertaining Film of the year
2017	Hebbuli	Yes	Yes	No	
2019	Pailwaan	Yes	Yes	Yes	

=== As cinematographer ===
Year	Film	Notes
2002	Romeo Juliet	
2003	Heart Beats	
2004	Ranga SSLC	
2006	Shree	
2006	Mungaaru Male	Won Karnataka State Award for Best Cinematographer
2007	Geleya	
2008	Haage Summane	Won Filmfare Award for Best Cinematographer – South
2009	Raaj the Showman	
2009	Maleyali Jotheyali	
2010	Appu and Pappu	
2011	Kempegowda	
2011	Johny Mera Naam Preethi Mera Kaam	
2012	Lucky	
2012	Jaanu	
2012	Rambo	
2012	Drama	
2013	Kaddipudi	
2017	Chowka	

== Television ==
Produced 4 Serials under RRR Creations

Year	Serial	Channel
2015-2017	Gruhalakshmi	Zee Kannada
2016-2018	Gangaa	Zee Kannada
2017-2020	Subbalakshmi Samsara	Zee Kannada
2020-2024	Sathya	Zee Kannada

== Awards ==
- Karnataka State Government Award for Best Cinematographer in 2006 (Mungaru Male)
- Filmfare Award for Best Cinematographer – Kannada for Haage Summane in 2008
- South Scope Award in 2009
