= Sanju Weds Geetha =

2011 Kannada film directed by Nagashekar

- DVD cover
- Directed by: Nagashekar
- Written by: Nagashekar
- Produced by: Pramod Narayan; Murali Mohan
- Starring: Srinagar Kitty; Ramya; Suhasini Maniratnam; Avinash
- Cinematography: Satya Hegde
- Edited by: Jo Ni Harsha
- Music by: Jassie Gift
- Release date: 1 April 2011
- Running time: 138 minutes
- Country: India
- Language: Kannada
- Box office: ₹3.5 crore

Sanju Weds Geetha is a 2011 Indian Kannada-language romantic drama film directed by Nagashekar and produced by Pramod Narayan and Murali Mohan. The film stars Srinagar Kitty and Ramya in the lead roles. Jassie Gift composed the soundtrack, while Sadhu Kokila composed the background score.

Sanju Weds Geetha was released on 1 April 2011 and became successful at the box-office upon release. The film also won critical acclaims and awards including the Karnataka State Film Awards, Filmfare Awards South and Suvarna Film Awards in various categories. The film was remade in 2017 in Bengali as Tomake Chai.

== Plot ==
Sanjay "Sanju" is a graduate in computer science who immediately leaves to his hometown in Kodagu, where he meets Geetha and is instantly infatuated. Sanju pursues her to like him too. After several attempts, the strict and strong-willed Geetha gives into Sanju's good nature and they soon become close. When Geetha reveals a dark childhood past to Sanju that involves her being abused by her cousin, Sanju looks past the incident and likes her even more. The cousin finds out about the romance between Sanju and Geetha, where he misbehaves with Geetha. Geetha pleads Sanju to marry her soon, where Sanju agrees and tells her that they would marry the very next day. Geetha runs away from her house. On the way, the cousin abducts and molests Geetha, but Sanju finds Geetha and rescues her, where he chases after the cousin and fatally stabs him with a knife. Sanju is sentenced to life imprisonment for the murder. When Geetha visits him in prison, Sanju asks her to marry someone else, which leaves Geetha depressed. On one occasion, Geetha visits one of their previous meeting spots, where she slips from the lookout and loses her memory. A series of tragic events follow leading to the ultimate death of Sanju and Geetha.

== Cast ==
- Srinagar Kitty as Sanjay "Sanju"
- Ramya as Geetha
- Doddanna as the prison guard
- Suresh Heblikar as doctor
- Umashree as Sanju's mother
- Suhasini Maniratnam as Lakshmi, Geetha's aunt
- Rangayana Raghu as Saasa, prisoner
- Sadhu Kokila as a prisoner
- Avinash as Chief Superintendent of Central Prison, Bangalore
- Sharan as Sanju's uncle
- Bullet Prakash as Parvathayya, prisoner
- Harish Roy as a prisoner
- Tabla Nani as Paramesh, jail constable
- Ramesh Bhat as a doctor
- Sharath Lohitashwa as Prakash, Geetha's father
- Jai Jagadish as Geetha's uncle
- M. S. Umesh as Setty, shopkeeper
- Harini
- Yogi
- Kanakraj
- Prasanna
- Arun Sagar as Geetha's cousin
- Jayalakshmi
- Brinda Parekh in a special appearance in song "Ravana Seethen Kadda"

== Production ==
The song "Gaganave Baagi" was shot at Bidar rocks.

== Soundtrack ==
Sanju Weds Geetha
- Soundtrack cover

Soundtrack album by Jassie Gift
- Released: 25 February 2011
- Genre: Feature film soundtrack
- Length: 33:04
- Language: Kannada
- Label: Anand Audio

Jassie Gift's music and Kaviraj's lyrics for the movie have been widely appreciated and is considered one of the top chartbusters. The soundtrack album consists of seven soundtracks. Jassie Gift reused the composition of "Gaganave Baagi" for the song "Arikil Ninnalum" in the Malayalam film China Town.

Track list
No.	Title	Lyrics	Singer(s)	Length
1.	"Sanju Mattu Geetha" (Duet Version)	Kaviraj	Sonu Nigam, Shreya Ghoshal	4:41
2.	"Gaganave Baagi"	Kaviraj	Shreya Ghoshal	4:41
3.	"Raavana Seethen Kadda"	V. Nagendra Prasad	Jassie Gift	4:44
4.	"Sanju Mattu Geetha" (Male Version)	Kaviraj	Sonu Nigam	4:40
5.	"Omme Baaro"	Kaviraj	Shreya Ghoshal	4:50
6.	"Nalle Nalle"	V. Nagendra Prasad	Tippu	4:49
7.	"Sanju Mattu Geetha" (Female Version)	Kaviraj	Shreya Ghoshal	4:39
Total length:				33:04

== Critical reception ==
Shruti Indira Lakshminarayana from Rediff.com scored the film at 3 out of 5 stars and says "Nagashekar dedicates this film to his inspiration -- actor-director the late Shankar Nag who surely would have been a happy man. Watch Sanju Weds Geetha for classy performances and visual extravagance". A critic from The New Indian Express wrote "Sadhu Kokila's background music is apt. Songs, especially 'Sanju mathu Geetha', are melodious. The movie is worth watching provided you can cope with post-intermission session loaded with sentiment". A critic from The Times of India scored the film at 3.5 out of 5 stars and wrote "Music director Jassie Gift wins your heart with his melodious tunes to the lyrics of Kaviraj and Nagendra Prasad and equally good is Imran Sardaria's choreography. Manjunath Sanjiv has some catchy dialogues for you. Sathya Hegde needs a special mention for his brilliant cinematography." B. S. Srivani from Deccan Herald wrote "Nagendra Prasad and Kaviraj all pitch in for a seamless transition from cute love story to hard hitting drama. Perhaps, it is time for the audience to shake off the cobwebs of cynicism and lethargy and appreciate a simple, wholesome fare". A critic from Bangalore Mirror wrote "Despite some of the glitches and the some dull scenes here and there, Sanju Weds Geetha has all the ammunition to draw people to cinema halls. Overall, it is a terrific attempt".

== Awards ==
Award	Category	Recipient	Result	Ref.
59th Filmfare Awards South	Best Actress	Ramya	Won	
59th Filmfare Awards South	Best Actor	Srinagar Kitty	Nominated	
59th Filmfare Awards South	Best Music Director	Jessie Gift	Won	
59th Filmfare Awards South	Best Lyricist	Kaviraj ("Sanju Mattu Geetha")	Won	
59th Filmfare Awards South	Best Playback Singer - Female	Shreya Ghoshal ("Gaganave Baagi")	Won	
2010–11 Karnataka State Film Awards	Best Actress	Ramya	Won	
2010–11 Karnataka State Film Awards	Best Art Director	M. Ismail	Won	
Suvarna Film Awards	Best Actress	Ramya	Won	
Suvarna Film Awards	Best Female Playback Singer	Shreya Ghoshal ("Gaganave Baagi")	Won	
1st South Indian International Movie Awards	Best Director	Nagashekar	Won	
1st South Indian International Movie Awards	Best Actress	Ramya	Won	
1st South Indian International Movie Awards	Best Cinematographer	Sathya Hedge	Won	
1st South Indian International Movie Awards	Best Actor in a Negative Role	Rangayana Raghu	Won	
1st South Indian International Movie Awards	Best Lyricist	Kaviraj ("Sanju Mattu Geetha")	Won	
