= Kaviraj (lyricist) =

Indian writer and lyricist

- Born: 17 August 1979 (age 47); Yadur, Shivamogga, Karnataka, India
- Occupations: Poet, lyricist, writer, film director
- Writing career
- Period: N.D

Kaviraj is an Indian lyricist, writer and film director. He is best known for writing lyrics for Kannada films since his debut in 2003 for the film Kariya. He has written lyrics for over 2000 feature film songs for more than 1000 movies and has won many awards including Filmfare Awards South twice and Mirchi music best lyrics writer award 2009,2011,2013, 2015. and 2019 He is considered one of the top lyricists of Kannada cinema in the present times.

Kaviraj debuted as a film director with the 2016 film, Maduveya Mamatheya Kareyole. He directed his second movie in 2019 by the title Kalidasa Kannada Meshtru starring veteran comedy hero Jaggesh became big hit and also critically well acclaimed for its social concern script on education system

== Awards ==
South Indian International Movie Awards

- Best Lyricist for "Gaganave Baagi" – Sanju Weds Geetha (2011)
- Mirchi Music Awards South
- Mirchi Music Awards Best Lyricist – he won 4 times 2009, 2011,2013 and 2015

Filmfare Awards South

- Filmfare Award for Best Lyricist – Sanju Weds Geetha
- Filmfare Award for Best Lyricist – Aptharakshaka (2010)
