= Oru Marubhoomikkadha =

Arabeem Ottakom P Madhavan Nairum
- Theatrical release poster
- Directed by: Priyadarshan
- Written by: Dialogues: Priyadarshan
- Screenplay by: Abilash Nair
- Story by: Abilash Nair
- Produced by: Naveen Sasidharan; V. Ashok Kumar
- Starring: Mohanlal; Mukesh; Bhavana; Lakshmi Rai; Shakti Kapoor
- Narrated by: Sreenivasan
- Cinematography: Alagappan N.
- Edited by: T. S. Suresh
- Music by: M. G. Sreekumar
- Production company: Jancos Entertainment
- Distributed by: Seven Arts International
- Release date: 16 December 2011
- Running time: 165 minutes
- Country: India
- Language: Malayalam

Arabeem Ottakom P. Madhavan Nairum in Oru Marubhoomikkadha (transl.The Arab, the camel, and P. Madhavan Nair in a desert tale), or simply Oru Marubhoomikkadha, (also known as Arabeem Ottakom P. Madhavan Nairum) is a 2011 Indian Malayalam-language survival slapstick comedy film directed by Priyadarshan and written by Abilash Nair. The film stars Mohanlal, Mukesh, Bhavana, Lakshmi Rai and Shakti Kapoor. The film was a commercial success at the box office. Oru Marubhoomikkadha was the 200th film of Mukesh. This film was inspired from the Hollywood movies Nothing to Lose (1997), Excess Baggage (1997) and Serendipity (2001).

== Plot ==
Puthanpurackal Madhavan Nair is a middle aged accountant who has come to toil in Abu Dhabi to fulfill his responsibilities to his family of two younger sisters who must be married and a father whose debt has to be paid. He has neither found the time to get married nor to have a life of his own. One day, he meets Meenakshi. They spend the day together and Meenakshi tells him that she is going to get married. Meenakshi gives her number in a currency note and uses this money. Both leave with a heavy heart, but they finally meet up after some years when Madhavan gets the note. He learns that her marriage did not take place. The two get engaged.

One night, Madhavan finds someone with Meenakshi in the bedroom. He sees his boss Hossinni's jacket on the couch and thinks that it was his boss with her. Overwhelmed with grief, he starts driving his car recklessly and is threatened by his childhood friend Abdu Kupleri, who had disguised as a thief. Madhavan tells Abdu that he was going to commit suicide and people who are a burden to the world should die and so Abdu has to die. However, the car gets sucked into the desert sand. The car was dead and Abdu scolds Madhavan, who was ashamed about all that happened. They find a car near the road.

Meanwhile, Thomas, a rich and miser businessman lives in the city with his daughter, Eliana, who gets kidnapped. The kidnappers call Thomas and ask for a ransom. Madhavan and Abdu finds Eliana, gagged in the car. They try to get rid of her and a series of funny events occur. Then, Eliana reveals that she herself planned her kidnap as she needs money. But her plan is inadvertently spoilt by them. She asks them to cooperate with her, otherwise she will have them arrested. Although, Abdu agrees at once thinking of the money he will get, it takes some time to make Madhavan agree. They plan it all over again; this time asking more money for Madhavan and Abdu.

Eliana's uncle Jose is a greedy man. He plans to steal all the ransom money. He makes a deal with a local killer and a dreaded crime boss Mikha Singh to accomplish this and kill Eliana. Madhavan, Abdu and Eliana stay in a wedding house and a series of confusion takes place when Thoma's driver Koya finds Eliana. The trio finally escapes from the place. The day to fetch the money arrives. The plan is spoiled by Mikha and the police. They manages to escapes from them and when Eliana threatens to inform the police and gets them arrested, Madhavan tells her to do it and takes her to her house and reveal everything to Thomas but Eliana jumps out from the moving car. She is taken to Abdu's house where his wife Khadeeja and their two children lives. The next day, Abdu is threatened by the money-lenders as he is in debts. Eliana tells that she was going because she didn't want to trouble the two anymore. She reveals that her lover Sameer was in jail and had needed money to release him. Madhavan stops her and says that they will get the money by thieving his boss. He wanted to take his revenge. His boss trusted him and had given him the secret code to his locker at office.

Abdu and Madhavan break in at night wearing masks. They hide the CCTV camera with paper and steals the money. However, Madhavan loses his control and takes off the seal. He shouts back at the camera, removes his mask, vandalizes the room and calls his boss names. They finally escapes. Madhavan gets drunk and goes to Meenakshi's house but is shocked to see two 'Meenakshi's. Meenakshi tells that the other one was Manasi, her twin sister and it was she and her husband who Madhavan saw that night. The boss had fallen into the pool at Madhavan's and Meenakshi's engagement and Meenakshi had given the jacket for laundry and it was returned in the evening on the same night Madhavan saw Manasi and her husband and Meenakshi had left the jacket on the couch. Madhavan realizes that Meenakshi still loves him.

After realizing his mistake, he goes back to Abdu and finds him gagged. Madhavan saves him and Abdu tells that Mikha had kidnapped Eliana and taken the money. They saves Eliana and fights off Mikha and his men. Meanwhile, the police arrives. Eliana tells to them that it was Mikha who kidnapped and that Madhavan and Abdu saved her. Madhavan tells Abdu to give back the money. They have a fight and Abdu tearfully and reluctantly gives it back which is returned to the locker.

Thoma is shocked when he finds out Jose was trying to kill Eliana. He reveals that his all wealth was not his but an Arab's, who had helped Thoma once. The Arab had died and his daughter was looked after by Thoma and that daughter was Eliana and so she inherits his wealth. He says that that was why he is a miser as the wealth was not his. Jose and Mikha gets arrested by the police. The next day, the boss is tearful to see his room vandalized. The CCTV visuals are checked. Madhavan is sure that he will lose his job. But the visuals had been tampered by Abdu. Madhavan pays back Abdu's debts with all the money-lenders, offers a good job in his company and invites him and his family to his and Meenakshi's marriage, along with Meenakshi and Eliana. Abdu thanks Madhavan for what he did to him and Madhavan thanks Abdu for tampering the CCTV visuals. The films ends showing both the friends embracing each other.

== Cast ==
- Mohanlal as Puthanpurackal Madhavan Nair (P. Madhavan Nair), a Abu Dhabi based Accountant
- Mukesh as Abdu Kupleri
- Bhavana as Eliana Thomas
- Lakshmi Rai in a dual role as:
  - Meenakshi Thampuratti, Madhavan's love interest
  - Manasi Thampuratti
- Shakti Kapoor as Hosini, Madhavan's boss
- Innocent as Mathai
- Nedumudi Venu as Thomas Varghese, Eliana's adopted father
- Mamukkoya as Mammadkutty Bhai
- Suraj Venjaramood as Koya, Mathai's son-in law and Thoma's driver
- Maniyanpilla Raju as Jose, Thomas's brother-in-law
- Lakshmi Gopalaswamy as Khadeeja, Abdu's wife
- Mini Arun as Mathai's wife
- Reshmi Boban as Jose's wife
- Nandu Poduval as Madhavan's colleague
- Assim Jamal as Mikha's henchman
- Vivek Gopan as Sulaiman

== Production ==
Principal photography of the film began in Abu Dhabi in March 2011. On 16 March 2011, while filming in the desert in Abu Dhabi, Hollywood director James Cameron visited the set and had a three-hour long chat with Mohanlal, Priyadarshan and the crew. He was very much impressed with Mohanlal's acting prowess and Priyadarshan's use of limited crew.

The initial title of the film was Arabeem Ottakom P. Madhavan Nayarum but later the title was changed to Oru Maruboomikadha and finally to the current title. In the Persian Gulf region the film was released under the title Oru Marubhoomikadha. This was following tremendous pressure from NRIs in the Persian Gulf. There were reports that the Arabs were unhappy with the initial title and also hinted at banning the release of the film in the Middle East.

== Soundtrack ==
Oru Marubhoomikadha

Soundtrack album by M. G. Sreekumar
- Released: 2011
- Recorded: S. S. Digital Studio
- Genre: Soundtrack
- Label: Manorama Music
- Producers: Naveen Sasidharan; V. Ashok Kumar

M. G. Sreekumar chronology
| Sarkar Colony | Oru Marubhoomikadha | Kunjaliyan |

The songs of this film were composed by playback singer and composer M. G. Sreekumar. The lyrics were penned by Bichu Thirumala, Santhosh Varma, and Rajeev Alunkal. Song mixing and re-recording premix were done by Renjith Viswanathan. The song "Gopa Balannishtam" is slight modified version of the song "Goruvanka Valagaane" which is composed by M. M. Keeravani for the movie Gandeevam, which was directed by Priyadarshan.

| Track | Song | Singer(s) | Lyricist | Raga(s) |
|---|---|---|---|---|
| 1 | "Chembaka Vallikalil" | M. G. Sreekumar, Shweta Mohan | Rajeev Alunkal | Abheri |
| 2 | "Madhavettanennum" | Ujjayinee Roy, Rahman, M. G. Sreekumar | Bichu Thirumala | |
| 3 | "Manassu Mayakki" | Sudeep Kumar, Rimi Tomy | Santhosh Varma | |
| 4 | "Gopa Balannishtam" | Madhu Balakrishnan, K. S. Chithra | Santhosh Varma | |
| 5 | "Gopa Balannishtam" | Madhu Balakrishnan | Santhosh Varma | |

== Release and reception ==
The film was released on 16 December 2011. Rediff gave the rating of 3.75 out of 5 stars. It took a distributor's share of ₹3.85 crore in 25 days from Kerala box office. The film was a commercial success at the box office.

== Awards and nominations ==
Nominations

- Filmfare Awards South - Mohanlal - Best Actor
- Kerala Film Critics Association Award For Best Lyrics - Rajeev Alunkal (Chembaka vallikalil)
- Kerala Film Critics Association Award For Best Music Director - M G Sreekumar (Chembaka Vallikalil)
