= List of Telugu songs recorded by Shreya Ghoshal =

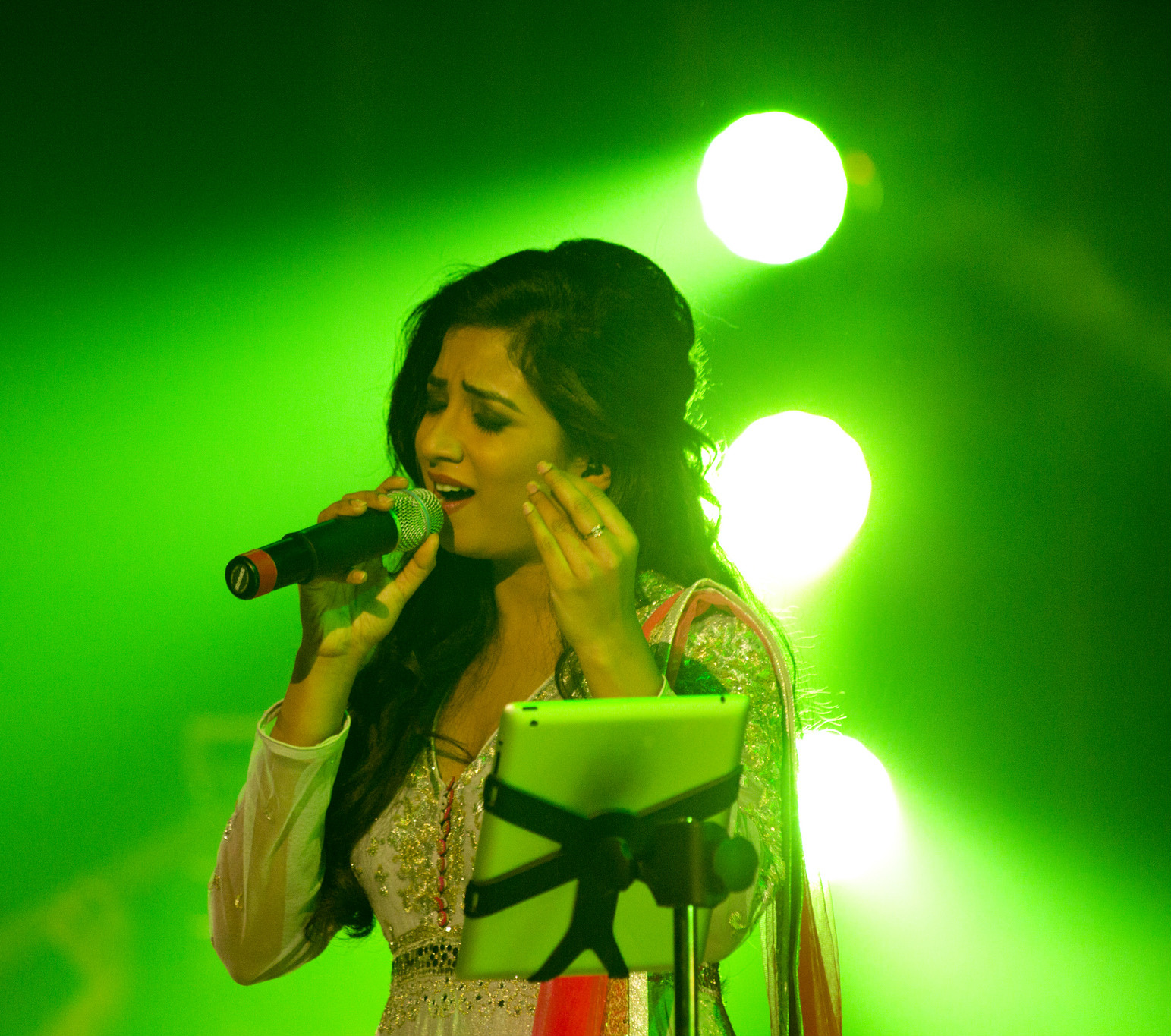
Shreya Ghoshal

Shreya Ghoshal (born 12 March 1984) is an Indian playback singer. She sings in Telugu, Hindi, Tamil, Malayalam, Kannada, Marathi, Gujarati, Bengali, Assamese, Nepali, Oriya, Bhojpuri, Punjabi, Urdu and Tulu languages. Ghoshal's career began when she won the Sa Re Ga Ma Pa contest as an adult. Her Bollywood playback singing career began with Sanjay Leela Bhansali's Devdas, for which she received her first National Film Award for Best Female Playback Singer along with Filmfare Award for Best Female Playback Singer and Filmfare RD Burman Award for New Music Talent. Since then, she has received many other awards. Apart from playback singing, Ghoshal has appeared as a judge on several television reality shows. She performs in musical concerts around the world. She was also honored from the U.S. state of Ohio, where the governor Ted Strickland declared 26 June 2010 as "Shreya Ghoshal Day". In April 2013, she was awarded with the highest honour in London by the selected members of House of Commons of the United Kingdom. In July 2015, John Cranley, the Mayor of the City of Cincinnati also honoured her by proclaiming 24 July 2015 as "Shreya Ghoshal Day of Entertainment and Inspiration" in Cincinnati. She was also featured five times in Forbes list of the top 100 celebrities of India. In 2017, Ghoshal became the first Indian singer to have a wax statute of her in Madame Tussauds Museum, Delhi. She also debuted as producer with her first single Dhadkane Azad Hain.

After a success of Devdas album Ghoshal was immediately called by various film industries for recording songs in her voice. Her musical journey in Telugu cinema began in the same year, 2002, when Ilaiyaraaja recorded her for the song "Sari Sari" in Ninu Choodaka Nenundalenu. Since then, she has recorded more than 290 songs with back to back hits.

Given below is the list of Ghoshal's songs in Telugu language:-

== Film Songs ==
=== 2002 ===
Film	No	Song	Composer(s)	Lyricist(s)	Co-artist(s)
Ninu Choodaka Nenundalenu	1	"Sari Sari"	Ilaiyaraaja	Kulasekhar	Tippu

=== 2003 ===
Film	No	Song	Composer(s)	Lyricist(s)	Co-artist(s)
Naaga	2	"Entha Chinna Muddulona"	Vidyasagar	A. M. Rathnam	Udit Narayan
Okkadu	3	"Nuvvem Maaya"	Mani Sharma	Sirivennela Seetharama Sastry	
Okkadu	4	"Attarintiki Ninu"	Mani Sharma	Sirivennela Seetharama Sastry	Hariharan
Vijayam	5	"Nijamena Nijamena"	Koti	Sirivennela Seetharama Sastry	Karthik
Vijayam	6	"Netho Nindu"	Koti	Sirivennela Seetharama Sastry	Tippu
Raghavendra	7	"Nammina Na Madhi"	Mani Sharma	Veturi	Kalpana
Simhadri	8	"Chinnadamme Cheekulu"	M. M. Keeravani	Vennelakanti	Mano
Charminar	9	"Yemaindo Emo Gani"	Ghantadi Krishna	Varikuppala Yadagiri	
Seethaiah	10	"Siggesthondi"	M. M. Keeravani	Chandrabose	M. M. Keeravani
Oka Radha Iddaru Krishnula Pelli	11	"Chilaka Chilaka"	Chakri	Kandikonda	Kumar Sanu
Oka Radha Iddaru Krishnula Pelli	12	"Aaku Vakka"	Chakri	Kulasekhar	Chakri
Pellamtho Panenti	13	"Enni Janmalaina"	S. V. Krishna Reddy	Sirivennela Seetharama Sastry	
Tagore	14	"Vanochenante"	Mani Sharma	Bhuvana Chandra	Udit Narayan
Ela Cheppanu	15	"Maagha Maasavela"	Koti	Sirivennela Seetharama Sastry	Udit Narayan
Toli Choopulone	16	"Suklaam Baradharam"	Chakri	Bandaru Daanayya	Udit Narayan
Toli Choopulone	17	"Hello Ammayi"	Chakri	Bhuvana Chandra	Udit Narayan
Okariki Okaru	18	"Vellipothe Elaa"	M. M. Keeravani	Sirivennela Seetharama Sastry	M. M. Keeravani
Okariki Okaru	19	"Nuvve Na Shwasa"	M. M. Keeravani	Chandrabose	
Goa	20	"Jalakalaataku"	Krishna Vasa	Bhaskara Batla	
Goa	21	"Edho Cheppaleka"	Krishna Vasa	T. Mani Sharma	Hariharan
Chantigadu	22	"Love Me Love Me"	Vandemataram Srinivas	Bhuvana Chandra	
Missamma	23	"Entha Sukhmido Manohara"	Vandemataram Srinivas	Bhuvana Chandra	Shankar Mahadevan
Nee Manasu Naaku Telusu	24	"Askava"	A. R. Rahman	A. M. Rathnam	Surjo Bhattacharya
Tiger Harischandra Prasad	25	"Premalona Yemi Maya"	S. A. Rajkumar	E. S. Murthy	Karthik

=== 2004 ===
Film	No	Song	Composer(s)	Lyricist(s)	Co-artist(s)	Note(s)
Lakshmi Narasimha	26	"Andam Lo Andhra"	Mani Sharma	Veturi	S. P. Balasubrahmanyam	
Varsham	27	"Kopama Napina"	Devi Sri Prasad	Sirivennela Seetharama Sastry	Karthik	
Athade Oka Sainyam	28	"Ne Bulli"	S. V. Krishna Reddy	Chandrabose	Udit Narayan	
Anandam Anandamaye	29	"Maa Madhu Maasapu"	Koti	Veturi		
Anandam Anandamaye	30	"Neeko Maatundi"	Koti	Sai Sri Harsha	Karthik	
Malliswari	31	"Janma Janmala"	Koti	Bhuvana Chandra	S. P. Balasubrahmanyam	
Mee Intikosthe Yem Istharu Maa Intikosthe Yem Thestharu	32	"Taha Taha Talamo"	Ghantadi Krishna	Veturi	Udit Narayan	
Jai	33	"Enni Aashalo"	Anup Rubens	Kulasekhar		
Nenunnanu	34	"Nuziveedu"	M. M. Keeravani	Chandrabose	Arnab Chakraborty	
Nenunnanu	35	"Intha Dooram"	M. M. Keeravani	Chandrabose	Tippu	
Nenunnanu	36	"Neekosam Neekosam"	M. M. Keeravani	Sirivennela Seetharama Sastry	KK	
Kushi Kushiga	37	"Godari Gattundi"	S. A. Rajkumar	E. S. Murthy	Rajesh Krishnan	
Kushi Kushiga	38	"Aakasha Deshana"	S. A. Rajkumar	Chaitanya Prasad	Udit Narayan	
Adavi Ramudu	39	"Govindha Govindha"	Mani Sharma	Bhuvana Chandra	Karthik	
Yagnam	40	"Chinnanati Chelikade"	Mani Sharma	Sirivennela Seetharama Sastry	S. P. Balasubrahmanyam	
Yagnam	41	"Em Chessavo"	Mani Sharma	Suddala Ashok Teja	S. P. B. Charan	
Swamy	42	"Naa Peru Ramba"	M. M. Keeravani	Bhuvana Chandra		
Sri Anjaneyam	43	"Poola Guma Guma"	Mani Sharma	Sirivennela Seetharama Sastry		
Sri Anjaneyam	44	"Avayi Tuvvayi"	Mani Sharma	Sirivennela Seetharama Sastry	Tippu	
Intlo Srimathi Veedhilo Kumari	45	"Nee Ollo Ne Neerchu"	Ghantadi Krishna	Peddada Murthy	Rajesh Krishnan	
Valliddaru Okkate	46	"Nuvvu 50 Kilolu Nenu"	Vandemataram Srinivas	Chandrabose	Udit Narayan	
Arjun	47	"Aey Pilla Em Cheddam"	Mani Sharma	Veturi	S. P. B. Charan	
Shiva Shankar	48	"Jabilamma Uguthunnadi"	Ilaiyaraaja	Bhuvana Chandra	Tippu	
Cheppave Chirugali	49	"Neeli Neeli Jabili"	S. A. Rajkumar	Chandrabose	Udit Narayan	
Letha Manasulu	50	"Kur Ku Kooru"	M. M. Keeravani	Bhuvana Chandra		
Anand	51	"Vachhe Vachhe"	K. M. Radha Krishnan	Veturi		
Anand	52	"Telisi Telisi"	K. M. Radha Krishnan	Veturi		
Anand	53	"Nuvvena Naa Nuvvena"	K. M. Radha Krishnan	Veturi	K. M. Radha Krishnan	
7G Brundavan Colony	54	"Thalachi Thalachi" (Female Version)	Yuvan Shankar Raja	Siva Ganesh		Dubbed
Suryam	55	"Nakai Puttinadana"	Chakri	Sudhakar Jaladanki	KK	
Suryam	56	"Neeli Kannula"	Chakri	Kandikonda	Udit Narayan	
Anjali I Love You	57	"Tellaga Tela Tellaga"	Madhavapeddi Suresh	Suddala Ashok Teja	Khushi Murali	
Vijayendra Varma	58	"O Manmadha"	Koti	Sirivennela Seetharama Sastry	Udit Narayan	

=== 2005 ===
Film	No	Song	Composer(s)	Lyricist(s)	Co-artist(s)	Note(s)
Balu	59	"Neelo Jarige"	Mani Sharma	Sirivennela Seetharama Sastry	Hariharan	
Jagapathi	60	"Nuvve Naa Pranam"	M. M. Keeravani	Chandrabose	Udit Narayan	
Kisna: The Warrior Poet	61	"Oka Mata Priya"	Ismail Darbar	—N/a	Udit Narayan	Dubbed
Kisna: The Warrior Poet	62	"Vachchene"	Ismail Darbar	—N/a	—N/a	Dubbed
Orey Pandu	63	"Chinuku Chinuku"	Anand Raj Anand	Bhuvana Chandra	Udit Narayan	
Orey Pandu	64	"Galilo Telutu"	Anand Raj Anand	Bhuvana Chandra		
Orey Pandu	65	"Raaleva Raaleva"	Anand Raj Anand	Bhuvana Chandra	Sonu Nigam	
Manasu Maata Vinadhu	66	"Aravailo"	Kalyani Malik	Chandrabose	KK	
Sankranti	67	"Andala Srimathiki"	S. A. Rajkumar	E. S. Murthy	Hariharan	
Sada Mee Sevalo	68	"Ee Dooram"	Vandemataram Srinivas	Kandikonda	Sonu Nigam	
Sada Mee Sevalo	69	"Yem Navvulivile"	Vandemataram Srinivas	Sirivennela Seetharama Sastry	KK	
Subash Chandra Bose	70	"Jajiri Jajiri"	Mani Sharma	Chandrabose	S. P. Balasubrahmanyam	
Kumkuma	71	"Ninduga Varalaxmi"	Ghantadi Krishna	Sai Sri Harsha		
Narasimhudu	72	"Muddula Gopala"	Mani Sharma	Vennelakanti	Udit Narayan	
Anukokunda Oka Roju	73	"Needalle"	M. M. Keeravani	Gangaraju Gunnam		
Anukokunda Oka Roju	74	"Righto Lefto"	M. M. Keeravani	Gangaraju Gunnam		
Athadu	75	"Pillagali Allari"	Mani Sharma	Sirivennela Seetharama Sastry		
Andhrudu	76	"Kokilamma"	Kalyani Malik	Chandrabose		
Allari Bullodu	77	"Noppi Noppi"	M. M. Keeravani	Chandrabose	Udit Narayan	
Modati Cinema	78	"Neeke Nuvvu"	Swaraj	Sirivennela Seetharama Sastry		
Abhimaani	79	"Raagam Theese"(Version l)	Varikuppala Yadagiri Goud	Varikuppala Yadagiri Goud	Varikuppala Yadagiri Goud	
Abhimaani	80	"Raveme Bangaru"	Varikuppala Yadagiri Goud	Varikuppala Yadagiri Goud	Hariharan	
Abhimaani	81	"Tolipoddu"	Varikuppala Yadagiri Goud	Varikuppala Yadagiri Goud		
Abhimaani	82	"Raagam Theese"(Version ll)	Varikuppala Yadagiri Goud	Varikuppala Yadagiri Goud	Vijay Yesudas	
Mahanandi	83	"Indra Dhanassulo"	Kamalakar	Eshwar Teja		
Sri	84	"Prema Prema"	Sandeep Chowta	Bhaskara Batla	Rajesh Krishnan	
Jai Chiranjeeva	85	"Maha Muddu"	Mani Sharma	Sirivennela Seetharama Sastry	Karthik	
Gowtam SSC	86	"Yedo Asha"	Anup Rubens	Sirivennela Seetharama Sastry		

=== 2006 ===
Film	No	Song	Composer(s)	Lyricist(s)	Co-artist(s)	Note(s)
Kokila	87	"Kokila Kokila"	Madhukar	Peddada Murthy	Srinivas	
Lakshmi	88	"Ammayi Andhra"	Ramana Gogula	Kulashekar	Tippu	
Godavari	89	"Tippulu Tappulu"	K. M. Radha Krishnan	Veturi		
Krrish	90	"Katha Vintava"	Rajesh Roshan	Rajashri Sudhakar	Sonu Nigam	Dubbed
Krrish	91	"Nuvvu Puttinadhi"	Rajesh Roshan	Rajashri Sudhakar	Sonu Nigam	Dubbed
Krrish	92	"Yedho Yedho"	Rajesh Roshan	Rajashri Sudhakar	Udit Narayan	Dubbed
Krrish	93	"Big Band Mix"	Rajesh Roshan	Rajashri Sudhakar	Sonu Nigam	Dubbed
Astram	94	"Padhahaarey"	S. A. Rajkumar	Bhuvana Chandra	Roshini	
Amma Cheppindi	95	"Vastava Natho"	M. M. Keeravani	K Shiva Shakti Datta	Harish Raghavendra	
Andala Ramudu	96	"Jabilli Raave"	S. A. Rajkumar	E. S. Murthy	Rajesh Krishnan	
Maa Iddari Madhya	97	"Nuvvele Nuvvele"	R. P. Patnaik	Chaitanya Prasad	Rajesh Krishnan	
Nuvvu Nenu Prema	98	"Preminche Premava"	A. R. Rahman	Veturi	Naresh Iyer	
Nuvvu Nenu Prema	99	"Maja Maja"	A. R. Rahman	Veturi	S. P. Charan	
Shiva	100	"Ye Oohalono"	Ilaiyaraaja	Sirivennela Seetharama Sastry	Vijay Prakash	Dubbed
Shiva	101	"Manasa Adagava"	Ilaiyaraaja	Sirivennela Seetharama Sastry		
Jadoo	102	"Ketugaada"	Yuvan Shankar Raja	A. M. Rathnam	Udit Narayan	
Jadoo	103	"Aadhima Vaasudu"	Yuvan Shankar Raja	A. M. Rathnam	Ranjith	
Manasu Palike Mouna Raagam	104	"Aalapana Na Manasuna"	K. M. Radha Krishnan	Veturi	Hariharan	
Manasu Palike Mouna Raagam	105	"Kotha Pelli Koothuru"	K. M. Radha Krishnan	Vanamali		
Sainikudu	106	"Sogasu Chudatharama"	Harris Jayaraj	Kulasekhar		
Maya Bazaar	107	"Preme Neramouna"	K. M. Radha Krishnan	Veturi	Hariharan	
Pellaina Kothalo	108	"Siri Siri Muvalle"	Agashtya	Vennelakanti		
Vesavi	109	"Urikene Manasane'	G. V. Prakash Kumar	Veturi	Srinivas	
Twinkle Twinkle Little Star	110	"Jaamu Reyilo"	Ilaiyaraaja	Ilaiyaraaja	Udit Narayan, Vinod Rathod, Sunidhi Chauhan	Dubbed
Twinkle Twinkle Little Star	111	"Magic Journey"	Ilaiyaraaja	Ilaiyaraaja	Sadhana Sargam, Bhavatharini	Dubbed

=== 2007 ===
Film	No	Song	Composer(s)	Lyricist(s)	Co-artist(s)	Note(s)
Guru Kanth	112	"Merisindi Megham"	A. R. Rahman	Veturi	Uday Mazumdar	Dubbed
Anumanaspadam	113	"Prathi Dinam"	Ilaiyaraaja	Vamsy	P. Unni Krishnan	
Anumanaspadam	114	"Ninu Vethiki"	Ilaiyaraaja	Veturi	Vijay Yesudas	
Anumanaspadam	115	"Kuy Laalo"	Ilaiyaraaja	Veturi		
Okkadunnadu	116	"Ivvaala Naa Pilupu"	M. M. Keeravani	Ananta Sriram		
Student	117	"Tholivalapu Virise"	Krishna - Raja	Veturi	Shaan	
Athili Sattibabu LKG	118	"Ee Chali Galullona"	Sri Krishna	Suddala Ashok Teja	Udit Narayan	
Athili Sattibabu LKG	119	"Ra Ra Ante"	Sri Krishna	Suddala Ashok Teja	Karthik	
Ta Ra Rum Pum	120	"Ta Ra Rum Pum"(Female)	Vishal–Shekhar	Rajashri Sudhakar		
Ta Ra Rum Pum	121	"Natho Forever"	Vishal–Shekhar	Rajashri Sudhakar	Shankar Mahadevan	
Lakshyam	122	"Chakkara Keli"	Mani Sharma	Ramajogayya Sastry	Karthik	
Toss	123	"O Madhu Vadhana"	Mani Sharma	Ananta Sriram		
Yamagola Malli Modalayindi	124	"Gundello Abbabba"	Jeevan Thomas	Bhaskarabhatla Ravi Kumar	Udit Narayan	
Sunny	125	"Ninu Kore"	Ilaiyaraaja	Veturi	Karthik	
Bangaaru Konda	126	"Unnattundi Edo"	Ghantadi Krishna	Bhaskarabhatla Ravi Kumar		

=== 2008 ===
Film	No	Song	Composer(s)	Lyricist(s)	Co-artist(s)
Pelli Kaani Prasad	127	"Cheppana Chinni"	Sri	Ramajogayya Sastry	
Ready	128	"Tu Tu Tu"	Devi Sri Prasad	Ramajogayya Sastry	Kunal Ganjawala
Kathanayakudu	129	"Oche Oche Vana"	G. V. Prakash Kumar	Veturi	
Mallepuvvu	130	"Chandamama Raave"	Illayaraja	Veturi	Ilayaraja
Mallepuvvu	131	"Malle Puvvu Lo"	Illayaraja	Veturi	Karthik
Chintakayala Ravi	132	"Merupula Merise"	Vishal–Shekhar	Chandrabose	Rajesh Krishnan
Avakai Biryani	133	"Veerudena"	Manikanth Kadri	Vanamali	Karthik

=== 2009 ===
Film	No	Song	Composer(s)	Lyricist(s)	Co-artist(s)	Note(s)
Konchem Ishtam Konchem Kashtam	134	"Aanandhama"	Shankar–Ehsaan–Loy	Sirivennela Seetharama Sastry	Shankar Mahadevan	
Konchem Ishtam Konchem Kashtam	135	"Antha Sidhanga"	Shankar–Ehsaan–Loy	Sirivennela Seetharama Sastry	Sonu Nigam	
Drona	136	"Vaade Vaade"	Anup Rubens	Ananta Sriram		
Mitrudu	137	"By Birth"	Mani Sharma	Ananta Sriram		
Oy	138	"Anukoledenadu"	Yuvan Shankar Raja	Vanamali		
Snehituda	139	"Inthaku Nuvvvevaru"	Shivaram Shankar	Bhasha Sri		
Snehituda	140	"Inthaku Nuvvevevaru"(Sad)	Shivaram Shankar	Bhasha Sri	Karthik	
Baanam	141	"Mogindhi Jai Ganta"	Mani Sharma	Ramajogayya Sastry		
Blue	142	"Priyathama"	A. R. Rahman	Rajshri Sudhakar	Naresh Iyer	Dubbed
Blue	143	"Chintela Makunedu"	A. R. Rahman	Rajshri Sudhakar	Vijay Prakash	Dubbed
Blue	144	"Gundey Lo Nippundiley"	A. R. Rahman	Rajshri Sudhakar	Sukhwinder Singh	Dubbed
Jayeebhava	145	"Okkasari"	S. Thaman	Sirivennela Seetharama Sastry	Karthik	
Romeo	146	"Enthaga"	Agasthya	Vanamali		
Nenu Tanu Aame	147	"Avuna Ade Nena"	R. P. Patnaik	Vanamali	R. P. Patnaik	Dubbed

=== 2010 ===
Film	No	Song	Composer(s)	Lyricist(s)	Co-artist(s)	Note(s)
Adhurs	148	"Neethone"	Devi Sri Prasad	Kulashekar	Kunal Ganjawala	
Bank	149	"Prathi Kshanam"	Chinna	Chinni Charan	Ranjith	
Ye Maaya Chesave	150	"Vintunnaavaa"	A. R. Rahman	Ananta Sriram	Karthik	
Ye Maaya Chesave	151	"Broken Promises"	A. R. Rahman	Ananta Sriram		
Varudu	152	"Bahusha Vo Chanchala"	Mani Sharma	Veturi	Sonu Nigam	
Prince	153	"Nee Kosame"	Sachin Gupta	Vanamali	Sachin Gupta	Dubbed
Prince	154	"Nee Kosame"(Dance Mix)	Sachin Gupta	Vanamali	Sachin Gupta	Dubbed
Prince	155	"Nee Kosame"(Hip Hop Mix)	Sachin Gupta	Vanamali	Sachin Gupta	Dubbed
Prince	156	"Prince"(Megaa Mix)	Sachin Gupta	Vanamali	Various Artists	Dubbed
Thakita Thakita	157	"Ishq Hai Yeh"	Bobo Shashi	Vanamali	VVPrasanna	
Komaram Puli	158	"Dochey"	A. R. Rahman	Chandrabose	Lady Kash and Krissy	
Robo	159	"Neelo Valapu"	A. R. Rahman	Vanamali	Vijay Prakash	Dubbed
Brindavanam	160	"Eyi Raja"	Thaman S	Ananta Sriram	Shankar Mahadevan	
Prema Khaidi	161	"Nuvvu Nenu"	D. Imman	Vennelakanti	Benny Dayal	

=== 2011 ===
Film	No	Song	Composer(s)	Lyricist(s)	Co-artist(s)	Note(s)
Mirapakay	162	"Dhinaku Dhin"	S. Thaman	Chandrabose	Shankar Mahadevan	
Anaganaga O Dheerudu	163	"Prema Lekha Raasene"	Salim–Sulaiman	Chandrabose	Salim Merchant	
Anaganaga O Dheerudu	164	"Prema Lekha"(Remix)	Salim–Sulaiman	Chandrabose	Salim Merchant	
Prema Kavali	165	"Tolakari Chinukai"	Anoop Rubens	Sahithi	Ranjith	
Mr. Perfect	166	"Chali Chaliga"	Devi Sri Prasad	Ananta Sriram		
Badrinath	167	"Chiranjeeva"	M. M. Keeravani	Chandrabose	Revanth	
Sri Rama Rajyam	168	"Jagadananda"	Ilaiyaraaja	Jonnavithhula Ramalingeswara Rao	S. P. Balasubrahmanyam	
Sri Rama Rajyam	169	"Sitarama Charitam"	Ilaiyaraaja	Jonnavithhula Ramalingeswara Rao	Shweta Mohan	
Sri Rama Rajyam	170	"Srirama Lera O Rama"	Ilaiyaraaja	Jonnavithhula Ramalingeswara Rao	Sriram Parthasarathy	
Sri Rama Rajyam	171	"Devulle Mechchindi"	Ilaiyaraaja	Jonnavithhula Ramalingeswara Rao	K. S. Chithra	
Sri Rama Rajyam	172	"Ramayanamu"	Ilaiyaraaja	Jonnavithhula Ramalingeswara Rao	K. S. Chithra	
Sri Rama Rajyam	173	"Seetha Srimantam"	Ilaiyaraaja	Jonnavithhula Ramalingeswara Rao		

=== 2012 ===
Film	No	Song	Composer(s)	Lyricist(s)	Co-artist(s)	Note(s)
Dhoni	174	"Chitti Chitti"	Ilaiyaraaja	Sirivennela Seetharama Sastry	Naresh Iyer	
3	175	"Nee Paata Madhuram"	Anirudh Ravichander	Bhuvana Chandra	Roop Kumar Rathod	Dubbed
Devudu Chesina Manushulu	176	"Nuvvele Nuvvele"	Raghu Kunche	Bhaskarabhatla Ravikumar		
Krishnam Vande Jagadgurum	177	"Sye Andre Naanu"	Mani Sharma	E. S. Murthy	Rahul Sipligunj, Deepu	

=== 2013 ===
Film	No	Song	Composer(s)	Lyricist(s)	Co-artist(s)
Naayak	178	"Hey Naayak"	S. Thaman	Chandrabose	Naveen Madhav
Naayak	179	"Subhalekha Rasukunna"	S. Thaman	Veturi	Haricharan
Jabardasth	180	"Allah Allah"	S. Thaman	Ramajogayya Sastry	Ranjith, Naveen Madhav
Sukumarudu	181	"Neelakashamlo"	Anoop Rubens	Sri Mani	
Thoofan	182	"Shakila Sentu"	Anand Raj Anand	Chandrabose	
Ramayya Vasthavayya	183	"Neneppudaina"	S. Thaman	Sahithi	Shankar Mahadevan
Masala	184	"Ninu Choodani"	S. Thaman	Ramajogayya Sastry	Ranjith

=== 2014 ===
Film	No	Song	Composer(s)	Lyricist(s)	Co-artist(s)	Note
Yevadu	185	"Nee Jathaga"	Devi Sri Prasad	Sirivennela Seetharama Sastry	Karthik	
Pandavulu Pandavulu Tummeda	186	"Guchi Guchi"	Bappi Lahiri	Bhaskara Batla	Adnan Sami	
Pandavulu Pandavulu Tummeda	187	"Sathemma Sathemma"	Bappi Lahiri	Ananta Sriram	Mano	
Race Gurram	188	"Bhoochade Boochade"	S. Thaman	Chandrabose	Rahul Nambiar, Naveen Madhav	
Pyar Mein Padipoyane	189	"Pyar Mein Padipoyane"	Anoop Rubens	Bhaskara Batla		
Manam	190	"Chinni Chinni Aasalu"	Anoop Rubens	Chandrabose	Hari, Ashwin	
Ra Ra Krishnayya	191	"Ra Ra Krishnayya"	Achu Rajamani	Ramajogayya Sastry	Yazin Nizar	
Galipatam	192	"Tere Mere Saath"	Bheems Ceciroleo	Bhaskara Batla	Javed Ali	
Galipatam	193	"Hey Paaru"	Bheems Ceciroleo	Sirivennela Seetharama Sastry	Adnan Sami	
Nee Jathaga Nenundali	194	"Vintunnava Nestham" (Female Version)	Ankit Tiwari	Chandrabose		
Joru	195	"Puvvalaku Rangeyala"	Bheems Ceciroleo	Bheems Ceciroleo		
Naa Bangaaru Talli	196	"Paavunai Oka Paavunai"	Shantanu Moitra	A. V. Anantharam		
Naa Bangaaru Talli	197	"Paavunai Oka Paavunai" (Unplugged)	Shantanu Moitra	A. V. Anantharam		
Naa Bangaaru Talli	198	"Paavunai Oka Paavunai" (Humming)	Shantanu Moitra	A. V. Anantharam		
Yamaleela 2	199	"Hai Haigaa"	S. V. Krishna Reddy	Ananta Sriram		

=== 2015 ===
Film	No	Song	Composer(s)	Lyricist(s)	Co-artist(s)	Note(s)
I(Manoharudu)	200	"Poolane Kunukeyamantaa"	A. R. Rahman	Ananta Sriram	Haricharan	Dubbed
Rudhramadevi	201	"Punnami Puvvai"	Ilaiyaraaja	Sirivennela Seetharama Sastry		
Kanche	202	"Itu Itu Ani Chitikelu"	Chirantan Bhatt	Sirivennela Seetharama Sastry	Abhay Jodhpurkar	
Kanche	203	"Nijamenani Nammani"	Chirantan Bhatt	Sirivennela Seetharama Sastry		
Bajirao Mastani	204	"Mastani"	Sanjay Leela Bhansali	Ramajogayya Sastry		Dubbed
Bajirao Mastani	205	"Meera Chittachora"	Sanjay Leela Bhansali	Ramajogayya Sastry	Pandit Birju Maharaj	Dubbed
Bajirao Mastani	206	"Bangaari Pori"	Sanjay Leela Bhansali	Ramajogayya Sastry	Neeti Mohan	Dubbed

=== 2016 ===
Film	No	Song	Composer(s)	Lyricist(s)	Co-artist(s)	Note(s)
Soggade Chinni Nayana	207	"Nee Navve"	Anup Rubens	Balaji	Dhanunjay	
Sardaar Gabbar Singh	208	"O Pilla Shubhanalla"	Devi Sri Prasad	Ananta Sriram	Vijay Prakash	
Sarrainodu	209	"Blockbuster"	S. Thaman	Ramajogayya Sastry	Nakash Aziz, Simha, Sri Krishna, Deepu	
Oka Manasu	210	"O Manasa" (Female)	Sunil Kashyap	Ramajogayya Sastry		
Oka Manasu	211	"O Manasa"(Humming)	Sunil Kashyap	Ramajogayya Sastry	Yazin Nizar	
Titanic	212	"Padipothunna Nee Mayalo"	Vinod Yajamanya	Bhargava Karthik	Vinod Yajamanya	
Rail	213	"Oorantha Vinnadhi"	D. Imman	Vennelakanti	Maria Roe Vincent	Dubbed
Rail	214	"Poye Pranam Vachindi"	D. Imman	Vennelakanti	Haricharan	Dubbed

=== 2017 ===
Film	No	Song	Composer(s)	Lyricist(s)	Co-artist(s)	Note(s)
Gautamiputra Satakarni	215	"Ekimeedaa"	Chirantan Bhatt	Sirivennela Seetharama Sastry	Udit Narayan	
Gautamiputra Satakarni	216	"Mriganayanaa"	Chirantan Bhatt	Sirivennela Seetharama Sastry	S. P. Balasubrahmanyam	
Khaidi No. 150	217	"You & Me"	Devi Sri Prasad	Sri Mani	Hariharan	
Katamarayudu	218	"Emo Emo"	Anup Rubens	Ananta Sriram	Armaan Malik	
Rogue	219	"Nee Kosam"	Sunil Kashyap	Bhaskar Bhatla		
Nene Raju Nene Mantri	220	"Sukhibhava Annaru"	Anup Rubens	Surendra Krishna	Rohith	
Lover Boy	221	"Ala Ala" (Female Version)	Ashirvad	Gurucharan		
Lover Boy	222	"Ala Ala" (Humming Portion)	Ashirvad	Gurucharan	Hariharan	
Adirindhi	223	"Neeveyley Neeveyley"	A. R. Rahman	Ananta Sriram	A. R. Rahman	Dubbed
C/o Surya	224	"Modalavuthondaa"	D. Imman	Ananta Sriram	Pradeep Kumar	
Jawaan	225	"Aunanaa Kaadanaa"	S. Thaman	Krishna Kanth	S. Thaman	
Hello	226	"Anaganaga Oka Uru" (Female Version)	Anup Rubens	Chandrabose		

=== 2018 ===
Film	No	Song	Composer(s)	Lyricist(s)	Co-artist(s)	Note(s)
Jai Simha	227	"Yevevo Yevevo"	Chirantan Bhatt	Bhaskarabhatla Ravi Kumar	L. V. Revanth	
Ego	228	"Emo Idivarakemo"	Sai Karthik	Balaji	Dinker	
Padmaavat	229	"Jhoommani Jhoommani Aade"	Sanjay Leela Bhansali	Chaitanya Prasad	Divya Kumar	Dubbed
Bhaagamathie	230	"Mandaara Mandaara"	S. Thaman	Sreejo		
Gayatri	231	"Oka Nuvvu Oka Nenu"	S. Thaman	Ramajogayya Sastry	Jubin Nautiyal	
Tholi Prema	232	"Allasani Vaari"	S. Thaman	Sri Mani		
Kirrak Party	233	"Neelo Ninnu"	B. Ajaneesh Loknath	Ramajogayya Sastry		
Mahanati	234	"Mooga Manasulu"	Mickey J. Meyer	Sirivennela Seetharama Sastry	Anurag Kulkarni	
Srinivasa Kalyanam	235	"Ithadena Ithadena"	Mickey J. Meyer	Sri Mani		
Paper Boy	236	"I Think I Am In Love"	Bheems Ceciroleo	Suresh Upadhyaya	Raghuram	
Thugs of Hindostan	237	"Suraiyya"	Ajay–Atul	Chaitanya Prasad	Nakash Aziz	Dubbed
Thugs of Hindostan	238	"Majjaare Khudaa"	Ajay–Atul	Chaitanya Prasad	Sunidhi Chauhan, Divya Kumar	Dubbed
Taxiwaala	239	"Neeve Neeve"	Jakes Bejoy	Krishna Kanth		

=== 2019 ===
Film	No	Song	Composer(s)	Lyricist(s)	Co-artist(s)	Note(s)
Mr. Majnu	240	"Naalo Neeku"	S. Thaman	Sri Mani	Kaala Bhairava	
Seema Raja	241	"Nuvve Lekha"	D. Imman	Bhuvana Chandra	Vedala Hemachandra	Dubbed
Pandu Gaadi Photo Studio	242	"Nuvvu Avunu"	Vinod Yajamanya	Rambabu Ghosala	Vinod Yajamanya	
Sye Raa Narasimha Reddy	243	"Sye Raa Title Track"	Amit Trivedi	Sirivennela Seetharama Sastry	Sunidhi Chauhan	
Dabangg 3	244	"Gulabi"	Sajid–Wajid	Ramajogayya Sastry	Jubin Nautiyal	Dubbed

=== 2020 ===
Film	No	Song	Composer(s)	Lyricist(s)	Co-artist(s)
Ala Vaikunthapurramuloo	245	"Samajavaragamana"(Female Version)	S. Thaman	Sirivennela Seetharama Sastry	
Entha Manchivaadavuraa	246	"Avuno Teliyadu"	Gopi Sundar	Sirivennela Seetharama Sastry	
V	247	"Vasthunnaa Vachesthunna"	Amit Trivedi	Sirivennela Seetharama Sastry	Amit Trivedi
Miss India	248	"Kotthaga Kotthaga"	S. Thaman	Kalyan Chakravarthi	S. Thaman

=== 2021 ===
Film	No	Song	Composer(s)	Lyricist(s)	Co-artist(s)	Note(s)
Uppena	249	"Jala Jala Jalapaatham"	Devi Sri Prasad	Sri Mani	Jaspreet Jasz	
Yuvarathnaa	250	"Aarambame"	S. Thaman	Ramajogayya Sastry	Armaan Malik	Dubbed
99 Songs	251	"Aakaasha Thaaralatho"	A. R. Rahman	Kalapradh		Dubbed
Tuck Jagadish	252	"Inkosaari Inkosaari"	S. Thaman	Chaitanya Prasad	Kaala Bhairava	
Konda Polam	253	"Chettekki"	M. M. Keeravani	Chandrabose	Kaala Bhairava	
Varudu Kaavalenu	254	"Digu Digu Digu Naaga"	S. Thaman	Ananta Sriram		
Drushyam 2	255	"Inka Ennaallu"	Anup Rubens	Chandrabose		

=== 2022 ===
Film	No	Song	Composer(s)	Lyricist(s)	Co-artist(s)	Note(s)
Radhe Shyam	256	"Ninnele"	Justin Prabhakaran	Krishna Kanth	Anurag Kulkarni	
Iravin Nizhal	257	"Mayava Chayava"	A. R. Rahman	Rakendu Mouli		
Ramarao on Duty	258	"Naa Peru Seesa"	Sam C. S.	Chandrabose	Sam C. S.	
Cobra	259	"Choope Oohallo"	A. R. Rahman	Rakendu Mouli	Nakul Abhyankar	Dubbed
Ranga Ranga Vaibhavanga	260	"Siri Siri Muvvallona"	Devi Sri Prasad	Sri Mani	Javed Ali	
Ponniyin Selvan: I	261	"Raachasa Maavaya"	A. R. Rahman	Ananta Sriram	Shankar Mahadevan, Mahesh Vinayakram	Dubbed
GodFather	262	"Thaar Maar"	Thaman S	Ananta Sriram		
Ninne Chusthu	263	"Ninna Monna"	Raman Rathod	Raman Lok		
Gurthunda Seethakalam	264	"Seethala Kaalama"	Kaala Bhairava	Sri Mani		

=== 2023 ===
Film	No	Song	Composer(s)	Lyricist(s)	Co-artist(s)	Note(s)
Shaakuntalam	265	"Madhura Gathamaa"	Mani Sharma	Sri Mani	Armaan Malik	
Music School	266	"Evo Saraagaalu"	Ilaiyaraaja	Rahman	Javed Ali	
Dilse	267	"Rendu Kannultho"	Srikar Velamuri	Srikar Velamuri		
Rules Ranjann	268	"Sammohanuda"	Amresh Ganesh	R Krishna, R Gosala		
Spark Life	269	"Idhi Idhi Maya"	Hesham Abdul Wahab	Anantha Sriram	Hesham Abdul Wahab	
Animal	270	"Kashmeeru"	Manan Bhardwaj	Anantha Sriram	Yazin Nizar	Dubbed

=== 2024 ===
Film	No	Song	Composer(s)	Lyricist(s)	Co-artist(s)	Note(s)
Inti No 13	271	"Po Pove Po"	Vinod Yajamanya	Rambabu Goshala	Vinod Yajamanya	
The Family Star	272	"Madhuramu Kadha"	Gopi Sundar	Sri Mani		
Satyabhama	273	"Kallara"	Sricharan Pakala	Rambabu Goshala		
Pushpa 2: The Rule	274	"Sooseki" (The Couple Song)	Devi Sri Prasad	Chandrabose		

=== 2025 ===
Film	No	Song	Composer(s)	Lyricist(s)	Co-artist(s)	Note(s)
Game Changer	275	"Naa Naa Hyraanaa"	S. Thaman	Ramajogaiah Sastry	Karthik	
Thandel	276	"Hilesso Hilessa"	Devi Sri Prasad	Sri Mani	Nakash Aziz	
Sri Sri Sri Raja Vaaru	277	"Madhuram Kadha"	Kailas Menon	Sri Mani	K. S. Harisankar	
Premante	278	"Pelli Shuru"	Leon James	Sri Mani	Deepak Blue	
Akhanda 2	279	"Jajikaaya"	S. Thaman	Kasarla Shyam	Brijesh Shandilya	
Eesha	280	"Aa Ningiloni"	R R Dhruvan	R R Dhruvan		

=== 2026 ===
Film	No	Song	Composer(s)	Lyricist(s)	Co-artist(s)	Note(s)
Bhartha Mahasayulaku Wignyapthi	284	"Addham Mundhu"	Bheems Ceciroleo	Chandrabose	Kapil Kapilan	
Seetha Payanam	285	"Assalu Cinema"	Anup Rubens	Chandrabose		
ENE Repeat	286	"Bathukamma"	Vivek Sagar	Chandrabose		

=== Delayed ===
Year	Film	No	Song	Composer(s)	Lyricist(s)	Co-artist(s)	Notes
2017	Dalapathi	281	"Neeku Naaku"	Vinod Yajamanya	Rambabu Goshala	Vinod Yajamanya	
2019	That Is Mahalakshmi	282	"Katha Modalavake"	Amit Trivedi	Krishna Kanth	Sathya Prakash	
2023	11:11	283	"Manasu Maatale"	Mani Sharma	Rakendu Mouli	Sri Krishna	

== Non Film Songs ==
Year	Album	Song	Composer(s)	Writer(s)	Co-artist(s)
2005	Hrudayanjali	"Emitamma O Nelavanka"	Kamalakar	Veturi, E S Murthy	Karthik
2005	Hrudayanjali	"Tellavaare Velavache"	Kamalakar	Veturi, E S Murthy	Shankar Mahadevan, Sujatha Mohan, Devan Ekambaram, Jaswinder Singh, Kalpana Raghavendar
2008	Velugu - The Light	"Sudhinam Sarva"	Ashirvad	Rev D David Mahadevan	Tippu
N/A	Three Note Song	"Raagam Rasamaya"	Ilaiyaraaja	N/A	Solo
