= Mumbai Mirror (film) =

2013 Indian thriller film

- Theatrical release poster
- Directed by: Ankoosh Bhatt
- Written by: Ghalib Asad Bhopal
- Produced by: Raina S Joshi
- Starring: Sachiin J Joshi; Gihana Khan; Vimala Raman; Prakash Raj; Aditya Pancholi; Mahesh Manjrekar
- Cinematography: Harshad Mhambre
- Edited by: Faisal Mahadik Imran Mahadik
- Music by: Amjad Nadeem
- Production companies: Vedia & Entertainment Pvt. Ltd.
- Release date: 18 January 2013
- Country: India
- Language: Hindi

Mumbai Mirror is a 2013 Indian Hindi-language crime action film directed by Ankush Bhatt starring Sachiin J Joshi, Gihana Khan, Vimala Raman, Prakash Raj, Aditya Pancholi and Mahesh Manjrekar. It shows conflict between powerful, corrupt dance bar owners and the Mumbai police. Mumbai Mirror was released on 18 January 2013.

== Synopsis ==
An honest cop locks his horns against a greedy evil bar owner.

== Cast ==
- Sachiin J Joshi as Abhijeet Patil, Gaitonde's bhanja
- Gihana Khan as Rani
- Vimala Raman as Jia
- Prakash Raj as Shetty
- Aditya Pancholi as Durrani
- Mahesh Manjrekar as ACP Gaitonde, Abhijeet's mama
- Prashant Narayanan as Manish
- Sudesh Berry as Lalit Yadav
- Rajendra Chawla as Aness
- Raja Bherwani as Nikhil
- Manish Khanna as Dutta
- Harry Joshi as Ahuja
- Gopal K. Singh as Pandey
- Rajat Bhagat as Surya
- Muzahid Khan as Abdul
- Sunit Razdan as Inspector D'silva
- Bhagyashree Mote as Bar dancer

== Production ==
=== Casting ===
Sachiin J Joshi plays a "quirky cop". Mallika Sherawat who agreed to play the lead opposite Sachiin J Joshi, walked out of the project despite being paid to act in the film. Gihana Khan was chosen as female lead.

== Soundtrack ==
The soundtrack of Mumbai Mirror is composed by Amjad Nadeem and the album contains six tracks. In a music review, a critic wrote that "Amajad-Nadeem make a good attempt with Marjawa though rest of the album leaves a lot to be desired".

No.	Title	Lyrics	Singer(s)	Length
1.	"Doom Pe Lakdi"	Shabbir Ahmed	Sukhwinder Singh, Sachiin J Joshi, Nadeem Khan & Preeti & Pinky	4:30
2.	"Marjawa"	Shabbir Ahmed	Sonu Nigam	5:33
3.	"Govinda Ala Re"	Shabbir Ahmed	Wajid Ali	5:19
4.	"Thumka"	Satya Prakash	Shreya Ghoshal	4:26
5.	"Blunder"	Naveen Tyagi	Ritu Pathak	4:03
6.	"Marjawa"	Shabbir Ahmed	Sayantani Das	5:30

== Reception ==
Critic Taran Adarsh of Bollywood Hungama wrote that "On the whole, MUMBAI MIRROR is for those who relish masala movies. Especially for the single screen circuit". A critic from Rediff.com wrote that "This is a terrible mishap of a film that doesn't hold a mirror to society, or the city, but rather stares at it with bloodshot eyes and a dagger in hand". A critic from The Times of India wrote that "Ankush Bhatt’s slick flick grittily exposes the nexus between seedy cops and sleazy bars barons, albeit with a lot of Dabangg-isms". A critic from Koimoi wrote that "Mumbai Mirror is a terrible mistake. If you want to laugh at the utter nonsense going on on-screen, you might as well sit through it".
