= Aamayum Muyalum =

- Film poster
- Directed by: Priyadarshan
- Written by: Priyadarshan
- Based on: Malamaal Weekly (2006) by Priyadarshan
- Produced by: Jaison Pullikkottil
- Starring: Jayasurya; Innocent; Nedumudi Venu; Piaa Bajpai
- Narrated by: Mohanlal
- Cinematography: Divakar Mani
- Edited by: M. S. Ayyappan Nair
- Music by: M. G. Sreekumar, Rajeev Alunkal (Lyrics)
- Production company: Full House Entertainment
- Distributed by: Maxlab Cinemas and Entertainments
- Release date: 19 December 2014
- Running time: 164 minutes
- Country: India
- Language: Malayalam

Aamayum Muyalum (The Tortoise and the Hare) is a 2014 Indian Malayalam-language comedy drama film written and directed by Priyadarshan, and co-produced by Jaison Pullikkottil under the banner Full House Entertainment. It is a remake of the director's own Hindi movie Malamaal Weekly which itself was a remake of Waking Ned. The film has a cast of Jayasurya, Piaa Bajpai, Innocent, Nedumudi Venu, Anoop Menon, Harisree Ashokan and Mamukkoya in prominent roles. The music is composed by M. G. Sreekumar. Lyrics by Rajeev Alunkal

The film's story revolves the story of the various characters in a village. Kashi, Nallavan, Kallu, Thamara try to shroud a murder that happens in their village. But it lands them in more trouble and they fear that they will be caught any time. Humor, romance, and suspense find space in the plot of this movie

The film, which commenced production in August 2014, was released on 19 December 2014 during Christmas. The film got mixed review and commercially; critics praised the performances of Jayasurya and Piaa Bajpai. The film is set in a fictional village reminiscent to the director's own yesteryear film Thenmavin Kombathu (1994).

== Plot ==
In a fictitious poverty-ridden village of Gowlipady, is virtually ruled by the ruthless and corrupt Zamindaress Bhandaravathi. Kashi is a lottery salesman. He is the only literate person of the village. Once, a lottery sold by him happens to win the first prize of ₹ 5 crore, greedy Kashi tries to get back the lottery ticket but doesn't know to whom he has sold the ticket. So, he conducts a treat exclusive to all those who have bought tickets from him. To gain entrance, they need to give their tickets back. As the treat ends, all the tickets he have sold except one is collected. Later, he learns that the remaining ticket, which won the prize, sold to Anthony is still not collected.

He goes over to Anthony's home and finds him dead. While Kashi tries to take the lottery ticket, Nallavan sees Kashi doing so. Later, Kashi makes Nallavan agree to split the money that Anthony received after dumping Anthony's body in the nearby lake. While doing so, Kallu sees them and overhears their plan. Later, Kashi explains it all and asks him what it would take him to keep quiet. He says he isn't interested in money and instead he wants to marry Thamara who is the daughter of Nallavan. After arguing for a while, they agree to do so. While all three go over to the lake, a group of village citizens, in search of Nallavan and Kashi, finds them with the body. With a made-up story, they get away with it with luck. Later, while Kallu drives to the lake, he stumbles upon Thamara and explains the story. Meanwhile, the vehicle rolls over to the nearby forest and the dead body flies over to the top of a tree. Kallu looks for the body, and finds it missing. Next day, Kashi goes over to a phone booth to call over to the lottery office and finds out that Anthony had already called the office. Now they drop the money plan and just want to get away with the murder. Then, a few men, while passing by, tell them that Anthony is sitting on the top of a tree, but they don't realize that he is dead. Kallu and the others get the body down and go over to Anthony's house with body.

There, Anthony's sister Mary also learns the story. Then Tamara tells her friend that she is going to elope with Kallu. Kallu's father argues with Nallavan that he got the money and he is rich. Then Kallu's father join their group and keeps it a secret. A big crowd forms in front of Anthony's house, and Anthony's sister is making excuses not to let them in. The crowd got in on the act. Now everybody is getting suspicious of their family. Anthony's sister finally made the agreement. Now the zaminderess in the village comes to Anthony's house and she knows everything. Everybody is getting annoyed. They finally get the agreement to do his funeral, but not let anyone know. They are going to make an agreement. They tell Nallavan to do the funeral and to be strong. Kashi tells the inspector the wrong way to Anthony's house. But Kashi is coming with the inspector who asked the route to Anthony's home. They meet Nallavan and the man asks Nallavan the route to Anthony's house, but he doesn't tell him. The reach a wrong house. And finally reach Anthony's house and Kashi tells Anthony's sister to tell the inspector that he is in the bathroom. Kashi sees Nallavan. Nallavan acts like Anthony and is yelling to Kashi like mad. They finally do Anthony's funeral. The inspector sees the funeral. They finish the funeral and everybody goes home. Mayillapa knows about the things between the secret group and argues that he wants to marry Tamara. Kallu's marriage got fixed but Mayillappa ruins it, and the rest shows how Kallu marries Thamara with Kashi's help.

== Cast ==
- Jayasurya as Kallu, Thamara's love interest
- Nedumudi Venu as Kashi, a lottery agent
- Innocent as Nallavan, Thamara's father and the milk vendor
- Piaa Bajpai as Thamara, Kallu's love interest and Nallavan's daughter
- Anoop Menon as Vijay Nambiyar, lottery ticket inspector
- Sukanya as Bhandaravathi, the Zamindaress
- Mamukkoya as Appayya, Kallu's father
- Harisree Ashokan as Mayilappa
- Nandu as Arcott Anthony Fernandez, a drunkard
- K. P. A. C. Lalitha as Mary Fernandez, Anthony's sister
- Idavela Babu as Vaidyar Gundappa
- Kochu Preman as Sexton Ouseppu
- Ambika as Kadambari, Kashi's wife
- Sona Heiden as Panchavarnam
- Krishnaprasad as Kaikambakaran
- Anjali J Menon as the news reporter
- Madan Mohan as Mayillappa's friend
- Bhavna Pani as item dancer (special appearance)
- Mohanlal as narrator (voice appearance)

== Production ==
The movie was produced by Jaison Pulikottil under the banner of Full House Entertainment. In July 2014, Priyadarshan selected Jayasurya for the lead role of his next Malayalam film, with the actor stating that the film would be a "fun thriller", "something on the lines of Thenmavin Kombathu" and that it would feature several actors "known for their comic timing", like Innocent, Nedumudi Venu and Harisree Ashokan. Jayasurya was thrilled after Priyadarshan called him for the project. "I have grown up on a diet of films made by Priyan sir and here I was acting in a film of his. It was surreal. The movie is a comedy, in which I impersonate a domestic help to win the hand of the girl I love." says Jayasurya. The lead female role went to Piaa Bajpai. She reunites with Priyadarshan after her debut film with him who introduced her. "While working on my first film, I had told Priyan sir that I would like to work with him. Both of us got busy with our respective careers, but we stayed in touch. Recently, he called me and said that he's working on something and asked me to keep my fingers crossed," says Pia. Anoop Menon is playing a cameo. Bhavna Pani was signed to perform in an item number, returning to Malayalam cinema after 10 years. The film is narrated by Mohanlal. His voice is used for a major long narration in the beginning of the film, through which characters and the story as such would be introduced. The actor himself revealed the news through his official Facebook page. The trailer released on 10 December 2014. It introduces the characters of the film and tells the story of the film revolves around a village on the banks of a river and its people. It goes with a narration that the film is about "a love, a death, a big secret and the villagers who are chasing a lot of money."

Priyadarshan has penned the lyrics for the film for the song Kaanakkombile Kakkakarumban. The film's music is composed by singer turned composer M. G. Sreekumar and has a total of four melodious folk tracks. "It is by chance that Priyan penned the lyrics for one of the songs. It is a rhythmic folk song which gives a feel of the story in the movie. After we put together the track's music, Priyan wanted to give lyricist Rajeev Alunkal an idea about the song and scribbled a few lines. As I checked its words, starting Kaanakkombile Kakkakarumban... I suggested that we retain the lyrics. Though he was initially apprehensive, we ultimately decided to go with Priyan's version of the song," says Sreekumar. The filming began on 30 August 2014. The shooting progressed in Karaikkudi, in Sivagangai district, Tamil Nadu. The filming completed in October 2014. And started the post production work in October. "Its pack up for 'Aamayum Muyalum' now post production works and will be hitting theatres this Christmas", shared Priyadarshan on his Facebook page. The cinematography of the film is handled by Divakar Mani and the editing is done by Aiyappan Nair MS.

== Soundtrack ==
Aamayum Muyalum

Soundtrack album by M. G. Sreekumar
- Released: 6 December 2014
- Genre: Feature film soundtrack
- Length: 19.36
- Language: Malayalam
- Label: Satyam Audios
- Producer: M. G. Sreekumar

The soundtrack consists of 5 songs composed by M. G. Sreekumar, all which have a rural and folk theme. The item number song Kaanakombile.., is penned by Priyadarshan. The song has two versions by Rimi Tomy and composer M. G. Sreekumar.

The song Kukukukoo is in "Maaya Malawa Gowla" ragam, crooned by Nayana and M. G. Sreekumar. "Ponninkilukkam song surprises, as traditional music strips mix in brilliantly with a new age feel and beats. Energy wise, it's the best song in the album". says The Times of India.

Tracklist
No.	Title	Lyrics	Singer(s)	Length
1.	"Kallyanipuzhayude"	Rajeev Alunkal	Nayana	3.30
2.	"Kukukukoo"	Rajeev Alunkal	M. G. Sreekumar, Nayana	4.20
3.	"Kaanakombile (Female)"	Priyadarshan	Rimi Tomy	3.50
4.	"Ponninkilukkam"	Rajeev Alunkal	Shankar Mahadevan	3.54
5.	"Kaanakombile (Male)"	Priyadarshan	M. G. Sreekumar	4.02
6.	Untitled		Vinu Sreelakham
Total length:				19:39

== Critical reception ==
Nicy V.P of International Business Times rated the film 2.5/5 and wrote "The film has somehow managed to keep the interest of the audience from starting till the end, but lacks depth in the script. The story is peppered with some fun elements. However, do not expect a laughter-filled script that has a smooth flow" and concluded "Aamayum Muyalum is a one-time watchable flick if you go without much expectation". Sijit Chandra Kumar of Deccan Chronicle rated it 2/5 and called it "a comedy of 'errors" and stated "It is not hard to sacrifice logic and disbelief at the altar of comedy but the problem is, the jokes do not possess the intended punch but fall flat like the desperate jabs of a tired pugilist. The mood is never serious, so you don't take the message, too, all that seriously; that money doesn't bring happiness or peace only but only breeds greed". Deepa Soman of The Times of India gave a rating of 2/5 and said "The makers of Aamayum Muyalum claim that it's a comedy flick, but after impatiently waiting for more than two hours for laughter, you end up with an entertainment-induced headache! For those planning to relive the memories of Kilukkam, Poochakkoru Mookkuthi, Thenmavin Kombathu, Boeing Boeing and all those evergreen comic capers, this is not one such joyride. As the film inches ahead piggy-backing on clichéd humour, one wonders whether it's actually a Priyadarshan film, for real". Behindwoods.com rated it 2.5/5 and said "A simple plot, a whole lot of interesting characters, abundance of slapstick and situational comedy, neat visuals, a laugh riot of a climax sequence that involves almost all the characters in the film. Priyadarshan has not stepped away from his heterogeneous formula that has been working for him since the 'Priyan – Lal' days" and gave a verdict "Great visuals and interesting characterization placed on a flat screenplay".

Deepak Mohan of Metromatinee.com stated "The film is basically an attempt by Priyan to rediscover himself. Much water has flown under the bridge since he used to be the last word of commercial success. How much Priyan has managed to connect with the audience of the present is the moot question. Gimmicks and recycled comedy sequences are acceptable as long as they keep the viewer hooked. 'Aamayum Muyalum' doesn't diminish the celebrated Priyan touch. It may not be his finest work, but it gives glimpses of old Priyan". Sharika C. of The Hindu wrote "Aamayum Muyalum is director Priyadarshan's attempt to be back in the race. But this time, the racecourse is set over a long-winding two- hour-forty-five minutes, and by the end the viewer is too tired to find out who hit the chequered flag first. An interesting and hilarious storyline, but one that fails to entertain without a well thought of script. For those who have already watched Malamal Weekly, there is nothing new here and for those who haven't it's only Diwakar Mani's visuals and a few good performances that are the only highlights.". Indiaglitz.com rated 6/10 stars and stated "The movie which has the best of the supporting actors of Mollywood fails to engage us with its content and slapstick comedies, largely due to its script lines. The movie has the exact setting of popular hit 'Thenmavin kombathu'. Priyadarshan has taken the best of the sequences of his many previous films and made a mish- mash of the scenes, but to find that the film doesn't thrill you on its entire length. The script, especially the dialogues in the second half falters and the intended wits don't make you laugh every time. Amayum Muyalum but doesn't ask for any big logic and if you can sacrifice it, you may not find it very difficult to endure an one time watch".

Bollywood Chats rated the movie as Average and said "Aamayum Muyalum is a one-time watchable flick on the off chance that you go without much desire."

Paresh C. Palicha of Rediff.com rated the film 1.5/5 stars and wrote "The film is disappointing and fails to make this a merry Christmas. Rather than watching Aamayum Muyalum, the DVDs of Priyadarshan's old films would be a better option.". Veeyen of Nowrunning.com rated an average of 1.8/5 stars and said "Aamayum Muyalum is another Christmas cracker that has gone down the drain this year. I'd advise you to grab a DVD of 'Waking Ned' and have a fun time cuddled up before your television than waste almost three hours watching these bummer hare and tortoise tediously making it to the finishing line. It remains that even if trimmed down to half its original length, 'Aamayum Muyalum' will still be a strenuous film that will challenge your tolerance every now and then". Akhila Menon of Filmibeat.com rated 1.5/5 and call it as "A Half-baked Movie" and further said "The major drawback of the movie is the weak script which leaves the plot blank at some points. The script fails to organise the characters and is a bit confusing. The movie offers very less scope to laugh. When compared to the classic comedy movies in his credit, Priyadarshan completely fails to entertain the audience with the execution of a below-average script. The stunning visualisation is the saving grace of the movie" and concluded as "An immature adaptation of Priyadarshan's earlier movies". Sify.com gave a "below average" verdict and wrote "Among this year's films, 'Aamayum Muyalum' could easily get into the nomination list for an award in the "test of the viewer's patience" category. It would require real patience to sit through this 160-minute long bore. Watch this one at your own risk please".
