= Vettam =

2004 Indian film by Priyadarshan

- Theatrical release poster
- Directed by: Priyadarshan
- Written by: Udayakrishna-Siby K. Thomas; Priyadarshan
- Produced by: Menaka; G. Suresh Kumar
- Starring: Dileep; Bhavna Pani; Kalabhavan Mani
- Cinematography: N. K. Ekambaram
- Edited by: N. Gopalakrishnan; Arun Kumar Aravind
- Music by: Berny-Ignatius (songs); S. P. Venkatesh (score)
- Production company: Revathy Kalamandhir
- Distributed by: Swargachitra Release
- Release date: 20 August 2004
- Running time: 171 minutes
- Country: India
- Language: Malayalam
- Budget: ₹2.25 crore

Vettam (transl. Light) is a 2004 Indian Malayalam-language screwball comedy film directed by Priyadarshan and written by Udayakrishna-Siby K. Thomas and Priyadarshan. It was produced by Menaka, G. Suresh Kumar, and Revathy Sureshkumar through Revathy Kalamandhir. Dileep and Bhavna Pani lead an ensemble cast, also including Kalabhavan Mani, Innocent, Janardhanan, Nedumudi Venu, Jagathy Sreekumar, Cochin Haneefa, and Mamukkoya in supporting roles. The songs were composed by Berny-Ignatius and score by S. P. Venkatesh.

Vettam was released in theatres on 20 August 2004. It was an underperformer at the box office. However, the film later gained a cult following. Priyadarshan partly adapted the film for his 2009 Hindi film De Dana Dan. The film was inspired by the 1995 film French Kiss.

== Plot ==
Gopalakrishnan, an expert safecracker and thief known as Gopi, steals a precious chain from a museum, drawing the attention of the police. On the run, he crosses paths with Veena, who aims to stop her lover, Felix, from marrying a tycoon's daughter. To avoid capture, Gopi hides the stolen chain in Veena's bag, but it mysteriously disappears, leading Gopi to believe Veena still has it. He decides to follow her on a train journey.

Things take a twist when Gopi is forced to jump off the train after Veena misses it while fetching water. Coincidentally, he lands in his hometown, where he is brutally beaten by his wicked elder brother. Gopi discovers that his younger sister's marriage is arranged to an older, wealthy, but uneducated man, orchestrated by his greedy elder brothers. He vows to find a better groom for his sister, but the stolen chain is still missing, and Veena appears to have it.

Veena possesses the chain and offers it to Gopi in exchange for his help. Gopi embarks on a quest to secure the funds for his sister's wedding and regain the family properties. Meanwhile, his friend Mani escapes town with his lover, Maala, and they all meet at a hotel in Mysore where Veena's lover Felix and his family are staying for an engagement ceremony.

Mathew 'Mathachan,' Felix's father, is in financial trouble and needs a significant amount of money. Fernandez, the bride's father, agrees to provide the money without knowing Mathachan's legal issues. Simultaneously, Mathachan's second wife, Swarnamma, plans to elope with a con man named Prince. Hamza Koya, a womaniser, is being pursued by a hitman, Paasha. A retired DIG of Police, Tom Uncle, is also staying at the hotel. Gopi instructs Mani to meet a dealer's aide to sell the stolen chain, using a rose as an identifier. However, the plan goes awry when Kurup, the father of Mani's lover, arrives with his henchmen. Chaos ensues as Kurup's daughter's name is Maala, and Gopi mistakenly refers to the chain as 'Maala.'

Paasha receives a photograph of the man he is supposed to kill, while Felix spots Veena and informs Mathachan. Mathachan and Paasha accidentally swap photographs, leading to confusion. A woman named Anushee arrives, wearing a dress matching Veena's, causing Mathachan to mistake her for Veena.

Koya enters Swarnamma's room, misunderstanding her intentions, which leads to further chaos. Another woman, Anusree, enters Tom Uncle's room, assuming him to be Koya. Tom Uncle finds her in his wardrobe, adding to the confusion. After a wedding party, Paasha falls into his own traps while trying to eliminate Fernandez. SI Lambodaran enters Mathachan's room, searching for him. Mani escapes Lambodaran and Kurup, running into Paasha's room. Felix mistakenly enters the con lady's room.

Gopi intends to give the chain to a dealer named Freddy but finds out that Freddy has been caught by the police. The senior officer reveals that Veena had pleaded to save Gopi's life and had returned the stolen chain to avoid legal trouble. Gopi had sacrificed for Veena without revealing it. Veena realises Gopi's sincerity and calls off her wedding with Felix. She accepts Gopi's proposal, and the story ends with the couple starting a new chapter of their life together.

== Cast ==
- Dileep as Gopalakrishnan (Gopi)
- Bhavna Pani as Veena
- Kalabhavan Mani as Mani, Gopi's friend
- Mithun Ramesh as Felix Mathew
- Innocent as K. T. Mathew (Mathachan), Felix's father
- Janardhanan as Fernandez (Achayan)
- Nedumudi Venu as Retd. DIG Tom uncle, Fernandez's brother-in-law
- Jagathy Sreekumar as Anthappan / Paasha, a contract killer
- Cochin Haneefa as Kurup, Meghamala's father
- Radha Ravi as IG Krishnaswamy IPS-Special Branch
- Sukumari as Brajitta, Tom's uncle's wife
- Jagadish as Hotel Waiter Sugunan
- Mamukkoya as Hamsakoya/ Raman Kartha
- Spadikam George as SI Lambodharan
- Bindu Panicker as Swarnamma, Mathachan's second wife
- Manka Mahesh as Susy, Fernandez's wife
- Ajith Kollam as Abdullah
- Geetha Vijayan as Anusree, Prostitute
- Kalabhavan Navas as Prince, Swarnamma's secret lover
- Sruthi Nair as Meghamala, Kurup's daughter
- Vimal Raj as CI Dineshan
- Sona Nair as 'Oppol', Gopi's elder sister
- Baiju as Prathapan, Gopi's elder brother
- Kalamandalam Kesavan as Parameshwaran, Gopi's father
- Machan Varghese as Babu, Kurup's helper
- Santhosh as Karunan, Gopi's elder brother
- Ramu as Madhava Menon, Gopi's eldest brother
- Ambalapuzha Raju as Mohanan, Train Station employee
- Kunchan as Santhosh, Train ticket examiner
- Nandu as Rajeevan, thief
- Nandu Pothuval as Bijalingappa, train passenger
- Hakim Rawther as Kasim, Man at tea shop
- Ajayan Adoor as Sathyan, Hotel Manager
- D. Philip as Palakkad Ramanadhan, Veena's father
- Vallathol Unnikrishnan as Varkeyachan, Mathachan's brother-in-law
- Krishna Prasad as Ganeshan, hotel manager
- Kannan Pattambi as Chackochan, Kurup's helper
- Vijayan Peringode as Chandran, Veena's paternal uncle
- Nivedhitha Santhakumaran as a teacher; Veena's roommate
- Priya Nambiar as Indu, Gopi's youngest sister
- Sheetal Bedi as Dancer in the song "Makkasai Makkasai"
- Jayaram as Taxi Driver (uncredited)

== Production ==
Jyothika was initially cast as Veena, but due to scheduling conflicts she was replaced by Bhavna Pani. A major part of the film was set and filmed at Howard Johnson's The Monarch Hotel in Ooty.

== Soundtrack ==
Vettam

Soundtrack album by Berny Ignatius
- Released: 2004
- Recorded: 2004
- Genre: Film soundtrack
- Language: Malayalam

Berny Ignatius chronology
C. I. Mahadevan 5 Adi 4 Inchu (2004)	Vettam (2004)	Chess (2006)

The songs were composed by the duo Berny-Ignatius and the film score was composed by S.P. Venkatesh. Lyrics were written by Rajeev Alunkal, B. R. Prasad and Nadirsha. "Oru Kathilola Njan Kandilla", "Mazhathullikal Pozhinjeedumi", "I Love you December" were successful upon release.

No.	Title	Singer(s)	Length
1.	"Oru Kathilola (Raga:Shyam Kalyan)"	M. G. Sreekumar, Sujatha Mohan	5:49
2.	"Illathe Kalyanathinu"	M. G. Sreekumar, Sujatha Mohan	4:39
3.	"I Love You December"	Jyotsna Radhakrishnan, M. G. Sreekumar, Sayanora Philip	4:41
4.	"Mazhathullikal"	M. G. Sreekumar	4:41
5.	"Makkasai Makkasai"	M. G. Sreekumar, Nadirsha
6.	"Illathe Kalyanathinu (Female)"	Sujatha Mohan	4:39
7.	"Mazhathullikal (F)"	K. S. Chitra	5:49

== Release ==
Vettam was released on 20 August 2004 on the occasion of Onam. A month earlier, the Additional District Court in Ernakulam had issued a stay on the film's release following a petition from the owner of Shenoys Cinemax, who claimed the producers owed him ₹60 lakh. The producers also faced other financial difficulties. Dhanya theatre in Thiruvananthapuram had advanced ₹50 lakh to Suresh Kumar (who produced the film under his wife's and daughters' names) on condition that the film would be screened at their theatres in Kollam and Changanassery, which the distributor Swargachitra Appachan opposed. Remuneration for actor Dileep and the film's technicians remained unsettled, with Kumar reportedly facing liabilities of over ₹2 crore.

=== Box office ===
Vettam was released alongside Kazhcha, Natturajavu, and Sathyam. The film underperformed at the box office. Made on a budget of ₹2.25 crore, the film collected a distributor's share of ₹92 lakh in 35 days, according to Sify. On 24 September 2004, the film was discontinued from theatres for a day following a court order and resumed from the following day.

=== Critical reception ===
Critic from Deccan Herald found the storyline similar to French Kiss (1995) and described it as "an entertainer with a wafer-thin story" and added that "the first half of the film is fast-paced and entertaining, but loses its charm in the later stages". But praised the comedic performance of Dileep.
