= Rajeev Alunkal =

Indian poet and lyricist

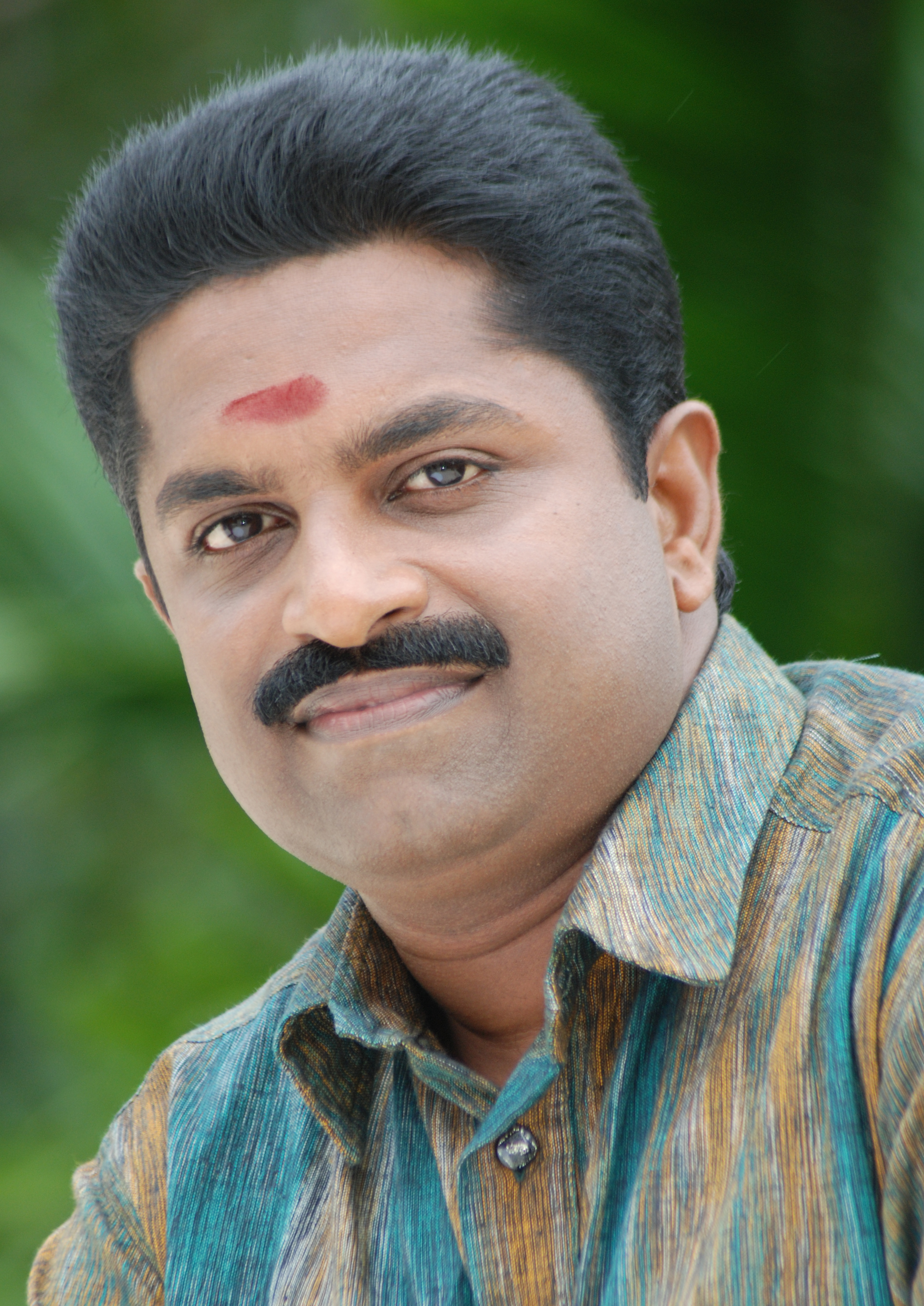
- Born: 17 August 1973 (age 53); Alappuzha, Kerala, India
- Occupations: Poet; lyricist; music director
- Years active: 1993–present

Rajeev Alunkal is an Indian poet, lyricist, music director and orator. Now, He is the vice chairman of MACTA (Malayalam Cine Technicians Association). He is the former chairman of Kumaranashan Smarakam, Pallana, Govt of Kerala and Member, Central film censor board. He is best known for writing lyrics on romantic and philosophical themes. He has written poems and songs. He has penned lyrics for over 350 songs in about 130 movies, including Vettom, Mallu Singh, Kanaka Simhasanam, Oru Marubhoomikkadha, Romans, Sound Thoma, Chattakkari, Nadodimannan, Aamayum Muyalum, Happy Wedding, Kuttanadan Marpappa, and Aanakkallan. Over the past three decades, Rajeev Alunkal has written more than 4,200 songs across theatre, albums, and films. In terms of his contributions to lyric writing over nearly thirty-five years, there is no one else from his generation who can be compared with him.

== Life and career ==
Alunkal was born to the late Kandanatt S. Madhavan Nair and the late Karuvally R. Indira hailing from Kadakkarappally Village in the Cherthala Taluk of Alappuzha District, Kerala State on 17 August 1973 and settled in the same place.

Alunkal published his first poem in 1987 at the age of 14 in the Nair Service Society's (NSS) Service Weekly. The poem won the Mannam Trophy for best upcoming poet. He became a professional lyricist in 1994 in drama through Cherthala Shylaja Theatres. He made his debut in Malayalam film industry in the 2003 movie Hariharanpillai Happiyanu. The music was composed by Stephen Devassy and the song "Thinkal Nilavil" became iconic.

Rajeev Alunkal represented the Malayalam language at the World Poets Conference held in Singapore in 2016 and in Russia in 2026.

For about a quarter of a century, he has been to many universities, colleges and schools in India, interacting with scholars and intellectuals. As a motivational speaker, he has delivered about 1000 speeches in and outside India, on topics such as cultural diversity and heritage of India, and advocating for the importance of languages and art.

Alunkal has written and tuned many patriotic songs, group songs, light music songs, nursery rhymes (kids' songs), and lullabies, which have crores of viewers on YouTube.

Another arena is devotional songs for village temples. Thousand of temple managements have used Alunkal's devotional song for their first song venture.

His poems are now part of the Kerala syllabus in the school college level classes.

The composition by Alunkal for Energy Management Center (EMC), an initiative that advocates conservation of energy and environment, is a widely accepted and celebrated song.

== Filmography ==
- Serafous (2026)
- Black Board (2026)
- Magic Mushrooms (2026)
- Ee Thani Niram (2026)
- Shukran (2026)
- Police Day (2025)
- Maharani (2023)
- Mister Hacker (2023)
- Power Star (2023)
- Nalla Samayam (2022)
- Udumbu (2021)
- Vidhi (The Verdict) (2021)
- Vellaaramaram Kunnile Vellimeenukal (2021)
- Oru Vadakan Pennu (2020)
- An International Local Story (2019)
- Aanakkallan (2018)
- Chilappol Penkutty (2018)
- Mere Pyara Desh Vasioum (2018)
- Vaasavam (2018)
- Shirkers (2018)
- Theetta Rappayi (2018))
- Devayanam (2017)
- Shirk (2017)
- Anna (2017)
- Melle (2017)
- Marubhoomikal (2017)
- Vedam (2016)
- Cell Phone (2016)
- Aaradi (2016)
- Happy Wedding (2016)
- Kaatu Maakkan (2016)
- Girls (2016)
- One Day (2015)
- She Taxi (2015)
- Thousand (2015)
- Swantham Ilanjikkavu P O (2015)
- Ashamsakalode Anna (2015)
- ATM (2015)
- Thakkali (2015)
- I Phone (2015)
- Aamayum Muyalum (2014)
- Kaasu Panam Thuttu (2014)
- Masala Republic (2014)
- Study Tour (2014)
- Medulla Oblongata (2014)
- Flat No. 4B (2014)
- Angry Babies in Love (2014)
- Good, Bad & Ugly (2014)
- Mithram (2014)
- Nadodimannan (2013)
- India Today (2013)
- Silence (2013)
- KQ (2013)
- Sound Thoma (2013)
- BuntyChor (2013)
- Mercury (2013)
- Sadharanakkaran (2013)
- Black Butterfly (2013)
- Bangles (2013)
- Lillies of March (2013)
- My Fan Ramu (2013)
- Mallu Singh (2012)
- Chattakkari (2012)
- Husbands in Goa (2012)
- Romans (2012)
- Isaac Newton S/O Philipose (2012)
- Ponnu kondoru Alroopam (2012)
- Njanum Ente Familiyum (2012)
- No. 66 Madhura Bus (2012)
- Ardhanaari (2012)
- Oru Marubhoomikkadha (2011)
- Father's Day (2011)
- Mrs Husbands (2011)
- Jockie (2011)
- Killadi Raman (2011)
- My Dear Kuttichathan (2011)
- Lucky Jokers (2011)
- Sarkar Colony (2011)
- Uppukandam Brothers (Part 2) (2011)
- Kottarathil Kutty Bhootham (2011)
- Ulakam Chuttum Valiban (2011)
- Pachuvum Kovalanum (2011)
- Oru Small Family (2010)
- The Metro (2010)
- Perumal (2009)
- Sketch (2009)
- Bharya Onnu Makkal Moonnu (2009)
- Kancheepurathe Kalyanam (2009)
- Love in Singapore (2009)
- Hailesa (2009)
- Akasha Gopuram (2009)
- Bhagavan (2009)
- Hareendran Oru Nishkalankan (2008)
- Anasuya (2008)
- Homam (2008)
- Rakshakan (2007)
- Akasam (2007)
- Black Cat (2007)
- Indrajith (2007)
- Malliswari the Prince (2007)
- Anjiloral Arjunan (2007)
- Bada Dosth (2006)
- Kanaka Simhasanam (2006)
- Colourful (2006)
- Chathrapathi (2006)
- Dubai Seenu (2006)
- Kanal (2006)
- Nilavupole (2006)
- Arya (2005)
- Monalisa (2005)
- Students (2004)
- Vettom (2004)
- Pranayamayi (2004)
- Komban (2003)
- Wanted (2003)
- Mampazhakkalam (2003)
- Hariharanpillai Happiyanu (2002)

== Notable songs ==
- "Thinkal Nilavil" (Hariharanpilla Happiyanu)
- "Munthiri Vave" (Hariharanpilla Happiyanu)
- "Priyathame Shakunthale" (Kanakasimhasanam)
- "Sundarano Sooriyano" (Kanakasimhasanam)
- "I Love You December" (Vettam)
- "Iniyum Kothiyode" (Bharya Onn Makkal Moonu)
- "Chembakavallikalil" (Arabeem Ottakavum)
- "Kakka Malayile" (Mallu Singh)
- "Oru Kinginikattu Vann" (Mallu Singhv)
- "Arthunkale Palliyil" (Romans)
- "Kanni Penne" (Sound Thoma)
- "Machan Ente Mathramalle" (Nadodimannan)
- "Eetho Priyaragam" (Aarya)
- "En Premathin Kopam Kanum" (Aarya)
- "I'm very sorry ഒരു നാലായിരം" (പ്രണയമായി)
- "Samavedam Navilunarthiya" (album - Swami Ayyappan - MG Sreekumar)
- "Ishtamanennadhyam Cholliyatharanu" (album - Ishtamanu)
- "Pathirulla Nazhoori" (album - Chithravasantham - P Jayachandran)
- "Nila Mazha" (album - Heart Beats)
- "Pazhavangadi Ganeshan" (album - Ohm Gananadham - KJ Yesudas)

== Published books ==
- Nilavilitheyyam – collection of poems (2008) – Paridhi Publications, Thiruvananthapuram
- Ente Priyageethangal – 1001 selected songs (2009) – H&C Publications, Thrissur
- Verukalude Vedantham – collection of poems (2015) – DC Books, Kottayam
- Pallotti Mittayi – collection of children's poems (2021) – Poorna Publications, Kozhikode.
- Kanalpennu – collection of poems (2022) – Maani Books, Alappuzha
- Iniyum Kothiyode – selected 130 film songs (2023) – Lipi Publications, Kozhikode

=== Poems ===
- "Ekakikalude geetham"
- "Achanum Njaanum"
- "Theresamma"
- "Naaniyamma"
- "Aaro oral"
- "Enik Ammayilla"
- "Kannaki"
- "Verukalude Vedantham"
- "Anaghashayan"
- "Iniyetranaal"
- "Enikkammayilla"
- "Kanalpennu"
- "Gangashankaram"

== Awards and recognition ==
He won an URF National Record in 2021 for writing 4200 songs in three lyrics areas (Drama, Album, and Cinema).

He received a Kerala Sangeetha Nataka Academy Award in 2012 for lifetime achievement as a lyricist.

Alunkal co-operated with music directors of three to four generations, including V. Dakshinamoorthy, M. K. Arjunan, A. R. Rahman, Raveendran, M. Jayachandran and Gopi Sundar. He has also worked with many Indian singers.

He won the Kerala State Award for Best Lyricist in 2004, 2025 (Drama), and he won the Kerala Film Critics Association Awards three times (in 2006, 2012 and 2018).

Alunkal worked with A R Rahman for the album One Love which acted to ensure the position of the Taj Mahal among the seven wonders of the world, on the behalf of the government of India.

During the canonisation ceremony of Mother Teresa at the Vatican, Pope Francis released the poem "Theresamma" written by Alunkal, and the Indian pop singer Usha Uthup rendered her voice for the same. This poem has also been translated into other languages including English, Bengali, Albanian, Latin and Tamil.

Year	Awards	Notes
2025	Kerala State Award (Drama)	For Best Lyricist
2025	Kerala Hom Minsiter’s excellence award	For the Anti-drug movement
2025	Ramayana Deshiya Puraskar	for his overall contribution to arts and cultural society
2023	Poovachal Khader Film Award	Best Lyricist – "Kannil Aake Pookal" (Nalla Samayam)
2022	Ashan Bharathi Deshiya Sahithya Puraskaram	for his contribution to arts and cultural society
2021	URF National Record	for 4200 songs in three lyrical areas (Drama, Album, Cinema)
2020	Kedamangalam Sadanandan Kalasagara Puraskaram	for his overall contribution to the writing industry
2019	Gurusree Award	Mumbai Sree Narayana Samithi for his 25 years of contribution to art & cultural society
2019	Kerala Film Critics Association Award	Best Lyricist – Aanakkallan "Vettam Thattum"
2018	PN Panicker Memorial Yuva Prathibha Award	for his overall contribution to the writing industry
2017	JC Film Award	for the song "Madhyana Sooryante" from the film Aaradi
2016	Kaumudi Teacher Award	for his contribution to arts and cultural society
2016	Kavyasree Award	By Indo Malaysian Cultural Forum for "Verukalude Vedantham"
2015	Sambashivan Memorial Award	For 20 years of poetic contribution to Film, Arts & Cultural society
2015	Thikkurissi Award	For Best Lyricist Angry Babies in Love – "Mele Chelode"
2012	Kerala Film Critics Association Awards	For Best Lyricist Oru Marubhoomikkadha – "Chempaka Vallikalil"
2012	Kerala Sangeetha Nataka Akademi Award (Kalasree)	Lifetime Achievement Award
2012	Rajan P Dev Award	Best Lyricist for Drama
2012	S L Puram Sadanandan Award	Best Lyricist for Drama
2012	Lohithadas Award	Best Lyricist for Drama
2011	Asianet Mini-screen Award	For Best Lyricist – serial Harichandanam
2010	Kaladarpanam Award	From Art & Cultural movement of India
2009	Vayalar Ramavarma Film Awards	For Best Lyricist – film Bharya Onnu Makkal Moonnu, song "Iniyum Kothiyode"
2007	Jeevan TV Award	Best Lyricist – album – Eakakikalude Geetham
2007	Haripriya Award	Best collection of poems – Nilavili Theyyam
2006	Kerala Film Critics Association Awards	For Best Lyricist Kanaka Simhasanam – "Priyathame Shakunthale"
2004	Kerala State Awards (Drama)	For Best Lyricist
2002	EMS Award	Best Lyricist for Drama
1997	Nana Gala POL Award	Best Lyrics in Drama
1988	Mannam Trophy	Best Upcoming Poet
