= Sachiin J. Joshi =

Indian actor and producer (born 1984)

Sachiin Joshi
- Born: 7 August 1984 (age 42); Pune, Maharashtra, India
- Occupations: Actor; producer; entrepreneur
- Years active: 1998–present
- Spouse: Urvashi Sharma (m. 2012)
- Children: 3
- Website: sachiinjoshi.com

Sachiin Joshi, also spelled Sachin Joshi (born 7 August 1984), is an Indian actor, producer, and entrepreneur known for his work in Telugu and Hindi cinema. His father, Jagdish Joshi, is the owner of the JMJ group of industries. Sachiin also owned the Dambulla franchise of the Lanka Premier League (LPL), the Dambulla Viikings, which was terminated by SLC in 2021 before the second season.

== Career ==
=== Acting ===
Joshi was born in Pune to Jagdish Joshi, owner of the JMJ group of industries. He was unsuccessful in establishing himself in Telugu films, but later began working as an actor in Bollywood to a mixed reception. Joshi made his debut in the 2002 Telugu film Mounamelanoyi and went on to star in two more Telugu films, Ninu Choodaka Nenundalenu (2002) and Orey Pandu (2005). He did not appear in films again until 2011, when he performed as the titular lead character in the Hindi film Aazaan, which he also co-produced. This marked his debut in Hindi film. Joshi returned to Telugu cinema with the remake of Aashiqui 2, titled Nee Jathaga Nenundali, and reprised the role played by Aditya Roy Kapur in the Hindi version. He co-starred with Nazia Hussain, who made her debut in Aashiqui 2. Joshi was also a lead in the 2013 film Jackpot, in which he starred opposite Sunny Leone and Naseeruddin Shah.

His film Amavas, which he self-financed and co-stars Nargis Fakhri, opened to extremely poor reviews, and was widely panned by critics for its "mediocre performances and direction."

=== Business ventures and legal troubles ===
Before becoming an actor, Joshi began a career as an entrepreneur. Among other companies, he owns the trouble-ridden Viiking Ventures, which sells the Kings Beer brand, now known as Goa Kings, as of 2015. The company filed for bankruptcy in 2018.

In January 2018, Joshi was accused of fraud by former business partner Raj Kundra, related to a poker league they were both involved in. Kundra has since launched legal proceedings against Joshi for defamation.

In 2020, during the COVID-19 pandemic, Joshi offered his Beatle Hotel in Powai to the governing body of Mumbai, as a quarantine facility for COVID-19-positive patients coming from abroad. He also donated food boxes to the local police and municipal workers.

In November 2020, Joshi purchased the Dambulla Viiking franchise for the upcoming 2020 Lanka Premier League. The team, originally named Dambulla Lions, was renamed due to becoming part of Viiking Ventures.

In January 2021, Joshi's business partner Parag Sanghvi filed an action against him, alleging a scam and nonpayment of franchise royalties for the Playboy Beer Garden in Pune.

In February 2021, Joshi was arrested by the Indian Enforcement Directorate on money laundering charges. A subsequent investigation by Indian tax authorities discovered unaccounted transactions of around ₹1,500 crore during their six-day-long search operation carried out at various premises linked to Joshi and his father. An April 2021 request by the actor to be transferred to a hospital for health reasons was denied.

In June 2021, Joshi was denied permission by a court to travel to Geneva, Switzerland, purportedly to visit his thirteen-year-old-daughter, because he was deemed a flight risk.

== Personal life ==
In February 2012, Joshi married model and actress Urvashi Sharma. Sharma later changed her name to Raina Joshi. The couple has three children.

== Filmography ==
Year	Movie	Role	Language	Notes
2002	Mounamelanoyi	Bobby	Telugu	
2002	Ninu Choodaka Nenundalenu	Ganesh	Telugu	
2005	Orey Pandu	Pandu	Telugu	
2011	Aazaan	Aazaan Khan	Hindi	
2013	Mumbai Mirror	Abhijeet Patil	Hindi	
2013	Jackpot	Francis	Hindi	
2014	Nee Jathaga Nenundali	Raghav Jayram	Telugu	
2016	Veerappan	Cop	Hindi	
2017	Veedevadu	Sathya	Telugu; Tamil	Bilingual film
2018	Next Enti?	—N/a	Telugu	Producer
2019	Amavas	Karan	Hindi	
