= Bhavna Pani =

Indian actress (born 1985)

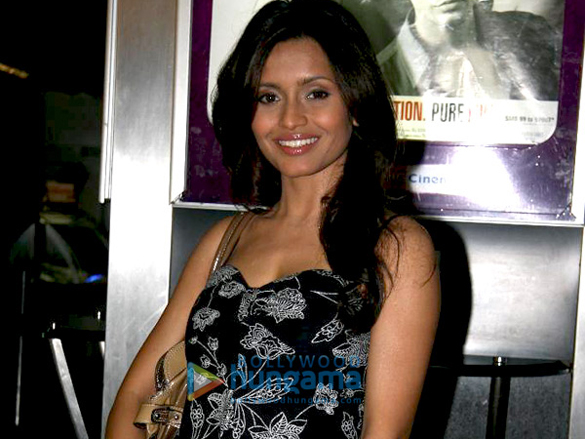
- Bhavna Pani at Special Screening Of 99
- Born: 6 July 1985 (age 41); Mumbai, Maharashtra, India
- Other name: Bhavana Pani
- Occupations: Actress; Dancer
- Years active: 2001–present

Bhavna Pani (born 6 July 1985) is an Indian actress, model and dancer. She is trained in classical dance forms – Odissi and Kathak, as well as in ballet and contemporary modern dance. She debuted in films in 2001 with the Kannada film Yuvaraja and the Hindi movie Tere Liye - both released within a gap of one month.

== Career ==
Bhavna Pani was born on 6 July 1985 and brought up in Mumbai, India. She is the daughter of ad filmmaker Uday Shankar Pani. She has a younger sister Devna Pani who is a fashion designer and actress. She did her BA in Psychology and Philosophy from Mithibai College, Mumbai.

She is trained in Odissi and Kathak by Kelucharan Mohapatra and Birju Maharaj. She has learned contemporary dance at Terrence Lewis Contemporary Dance Company and is also trained in Jazz and Ballet.

She started her career in films with the Puri Jagannadh directorial Kannada film Yuvaraja (2001). Her first Bollywood film Tere Liye released a month later. Since then, she has acted in many films including R. Srinivas directed Telugu film Ninu Choodaka Nenundalenu ( 2002 ) and Priyadarshan's Malayalam comedy film Vettam. She got well acceptance by malayalee audience for portraying Veena in Vettam and the film achieved a cult status after TV release. She has also expressed that she likes to do more romantic comedy films.

She has been performing as the lead dancer in Sahara India's ambitious production Bharti for over ten years. She won Mahindra Excellence in Theatre Award for Best Supporting Actress for So Many Socks.

== Filmography ==
Year	Film	Role	Language	Notes
2001	Yuvaraja	Janaki	Kannada	Debut film
2001	Tere Liye	Piya Anand / Piya Bose	Hindi	
2001	Love Marriage	Shobha	Tamil	
2002	Ninagoskara	Apoorva	Kannada	
2002	Dil Vil Pyar Vyar	Rachna	Hindi	
2002	Ninu Choodaka Nenundalenu	Kaveri	Telugu	
2004	Vettam	Veena	Malayalam	
2005	Gilli Gilli Atta	Teacher Didi	Hindi	
2009	Fast Forward	Jheel	Hindi	
2012	Tezz	Radhika	Hindi	
2013	The Graveyard Shift		Hindi	
2014	Aamayum Muyalum	Dancer	Malayalam	Special appearance in the song "Kaanakombile"
2015	Hawaizaada	Queen	Hindi	
2017	The Big Fat City	Anu	Hindi	
2018	Fraud Saiyaan	Chanda	Hindi	
2019	Space Mom's	Dr. Shanti Srivastava	Hindi	
2025	Madam Driver	Hassan's Wife	Hindi	
2026	Bhooth Bangla	Ragini	Hindi	
2026	Pritam and Pedro	Ana Goretti	Hindi	Web Series
