= Tere Liye (film) =

- Directed by: Sanjay Gadhvi
- Screenplay by: Abbas Tyrewala; Anant Balani
- Produced by: Devang Dholakia
- Starring: Arjun Punj; Shilpa Saklani; Bhavna Pani; Hiten Paintal; Sonali Khare; Neelu Kohli; Pankit Thakker; Imran Ahmed Khan
- Cinematography: Sunil Patel
- Edited by: Rajkumar Hirani
- Music by: Jeet-Pritam
- Production company: Zee Telefilms
- Release date: 14 December 2001
- Running time: 138 minutes
- Country: India
- Language: Hindi

Tere Liye is a 2001 Indian Hindi-language coming of age film directed by Sanjay Gadhvi. The film was released on 14 December 2001.

== Plot ==
The teenage children of various workers at a film studio form a music band and struggle to stick together in turbulent times.

== Cast ==
- Arjun Punj as Aditya Verma
- Shilpa Saklani as Ritu Malhotra
- Bhavna Pani as Piya Anand / Piya Bose
- Hiten Paintal as Devprakash Tandon
- Sonali Khare as Tara
- Neelu Kohli as Hero's Mother
- Pankit Thakker as Raghu
- Imran Ahmed Khan as Ranjeet Bose, Piya's estranged father

== Soundtrack ==
All music is composed by Jeet-Pritam (in their debut).

No.	Title	Music	Singer(s)	Length
1.	"Dil Dhapaak"	Jeet-Pritam	Sonu Nigam
2.	"Tere Liye (Title Track)"	Jeet-Pritam	Sonu Nigam
3.	"Suno Piya"	Jeet-Pritam	Sonu Nigam, Kavita Krishnamurthy
4.	"Chikna Ajnabi"	Jeet-Pritam	Sonu Nigam, Kavita Krishnamurthy
5.	"Tere Liye (Sad)"	Jeet-Pritam	Sonu Nigam, K. K.
6.	"Halka Halka Paani"	Jeet-Pritam	Sonu Nigam, Jaspinder Narula
7.	"Tanha Hoon Yaara"	Jeet-Pritam	Hariharan
8.	"Jee Lenge"	Jeet-Pritam	Sonu Nigam, Kavita Krishnamurthy, K. K., Swastika
9.	"Dil Dhapaak (Remix)"	Jeet-Pritam	Sonu Nigam
