= Ninu Choodaka Nenundalenu =

2002 Telugu film by R. Srinivas

- Theatrical release poster
- Directed by: R. Srinivas
- Written by: R. Srinivas (Story & screenplay)
- Produced by: J. M. Joshi
- Starring: Sachin; Bhavana Pani
- Cinematography: S. Arun Kumar
- Edited by: K. V. Krishna Reddy
- Music by: Ilayaraja
- Production company: J. M. Entertainment
- Release date: 21 December 2002
- Country: India
- Language: Telugu

Ninu Choodaka Nenundalenu (transl. I can't live without seeing you) is a 2002 Indian Telugu-language romantic drama film written and directed by R. Srinivas in his directorial debut. Produced by J. M. Joshi, the film stars Sachin and Bhavana Pani in the lead roles. The plot revolves around two engineering students whose relationship evolves from hostility to love, despite societal and familial challenges.

The film features a soundtrack composed by Ilayaraja, marking his return to Telugu cinema after a hiatus, with lyrics penned by Kulasekhar. The music received critical acclaim for its melodic and classical appeal. Notably, the song "Sari Sari" marked the Telugu playback debut of singer Shreya Ghoshal.

Released on 21 December 2002, Ninu Choodaka Nenundalenu was praised for its music but faced criticism for its weak storyline and performances, leading to its failure at the box office.

== Plot ==
The story is narrated in a flashback by Ganesh. Ganesh and Kaveri, both engineering students, share a strained relationship marked by constant quarrels. They live as tenants in the house of a kind couple, played by Chandra Mohan and Sana. Ganesh's father is a landlord, while Kaveri's father is a collector. During one of their arguments, Kaveri mistakenly adds cyanide to Ganesh's food, believing it to be salt. Upon realizing her error, she discards the food just in time. However, Ganesh, upset over the wasted meal, slaps Kaveri. Following this incident, Kaveri begins to develop feelings for him.

Eventually, their parents agree to their marriage, but differences in social status create challenges. Despite opposition, Ganesh and Kaveri marry against their families' wishes. Chandra Mohan helps Ganesh secure a job and offers his house to the couple before leaving for America. On their wedding anniversary, Ganesh returns from a work trip, and Kaveri, eager to meet him, accidentally falls down a staircase. She is diagnosed with a brain hemorrhage but recovers after medical treatment. The film concludes on a positive note as the couple overcomes their difficulties.

== Cast ==
- Sachin as Ganesh
- Bhavana Pani as Kaveri
- Chandra Mohan
- Sana
- Ali
- Venu Madhav
- Manorama
- M. S. Narayana
- Vizag Prasad
- Ahuti Prasad
- Narsing Yadav
- Ragini
- Nagma (guest role)

== Production ==
The film's title, Ninu Choodaka Nenundalenu, was based on a song from Neerajanam (1988). Director R. Srinivas also wrote the script for the film. The project was produced by J. M. Joshi, the father of lead actor Sachin, under the banner of J. M. Entertainment. After completing approximately 80% of the film, director R. Srinivas departed from the project, leaving the remaining portions to be completed by Sachin.

Nagma, who had re-entered the Telugu film industry with Allari Ramudu (2002), experienced a decline in acting opportunities following her return. Consequently, she made a special appearance in Ninu Choodaka Nenundalenu, performing an item number.

== Music ==
The music for Ninu Choodaka Nenundalenu was composed by Ilayaraja, with lyrics written by Kulasekhar. The soundtrack, released through Aditya Music, received positive reviews for its melodic appeal.

The song "Sari Sari" marked the Telugu playback debut of singer Shreya Ghoshal, earning particular praise for her vocal performance. Another notable track, "Jajimalli," adapted from Ilayaraja's Tamil composition "Enna Solli" from En Mana Vaanil (2002), was highlighted for its classical melody. The song "Kondapalli" is adapted from Ilayaraja's Malayalam composition "Kodamanjil" from Kochu Kochu Santhoshangal (2000).

In his review of the soundtrack, Kiran of Telugucinema.com described it as "Vintage Ilayaraja," highlighting the melodic and classical compositions. He specifically noted "Jajimalli" as a standout track, while observing the absence of Ilayaraja's traditional instrumental signatures.

All lyrics are written by Kulasekhar.

Track list
No.	Title	Singer(s)	Length
1.	"Kommallo Koyila"	Ilayaraja, Sadhana Sargam	4:34
2.	"Edo Mounaragam"	KK	4:55
3.	"Kondapalli"	KK, Sadhana Sargam	4:59
4.	"Chamak Cham"	R. P. Patnaik	5:08
5.	"Jajimalli"	Sadhana Sargam	4:54
6.	"Sari Sari"	Shreya Ghoshal, Tippu	5:18
Total length:			29:48

== Reception ==
Sri of Telugucinema.com critiqued Ninu Choodaka Nenundalenu for its lacklustre story and performances, noting that Ilayaraja's music was its only saving grace.
