= Orey Pandu =

2005 Indian Telugu-language romantic drama film

- DVD cover
- Directed by: S. V. Krishna Reddy
- Written by: Chintapalli Ramana (dialogues)
- Screenplay by: S. V. Krishna Reddy
- Story by: Satyanand
- Produced by: Gireesh Kumar Sanghi
- Starring: Sachin; Sandali Sinha
- Music by: Anand Raj Anand
- Production company: Gireesh Pictures
- Release date: 11 February 2005
- Country: India
- Language: Telugu

Orey Pandu (transl. Hey Pandu) is a 2005 Indian Telugu-language romantic drama film directed by S. V. Krishna Reddy and starring Sachin and Sandali Sinha. The film is a remake of the Hindi film Koi... Mil Gaya (2003). The ET in that film is replaced with a sage. The music is composed by Anand Raj Anand. After the film's failure, Joshi ventured into Bollywood films.

== Cast ==
- Sachin as Pandu
- Sandali Sinha as Priya
- Bhanupriya as Pandu's mother
- Telangana Shakuntala
- Sana as Priya's mother
- Naresh as Pandu's father
- Sayaji Shinde as Vicky's father
- Benarjee as Priya's father
- Kota Srinivasa Rao as Police Inspector
- Brahmanandam as Hotel manager
- Babu Mohan as Man who spits on plant
- AVS
- Venu Madhav as Hoax caller
- Rajeev Kanakala as Vicky
- Surya as Man with rifle
- L. B. Sriram as TV4 reporter
- Chitram Srinu as Vicky's friend
- Bandla Ganesh as Vicky's friend
- Chitram Basha as Vicky's friend
- Ravi Kiran as Vicky's friend
- Master Deepak as Sardarji
- Master Manoj
- Master Sriraz
- Master Abhinav
- Baby Sweety
- Baby Rithika

== Soundtrack ==
The soundtrack was composed by Anand Raj Anand.

Track listing
No.	Title	Lyrics	Singer(s)	Length
1.	"Aakasha Veedilo"	Bhuvana Chandra	Sonu Nigam, Mahalakshmi Iyer	4:11
2.	"Chinnaguntanugani"	Kulasekhar	Shaan	4:28
3.	"Chinuku Chinuku"	Bhuvana Chandra	Shreya Ghoshal, Udit Narayan	4:06
4.	"Come Come"	Bhuvana Chandra	Mahalakshmi Iyer	4:41
5.	"Galilo Theluthu"	Bhuvana Chandra	Shreya Ghoshal	4:39
6.	"Raleva Raleva"	Bhuvana Chandra	Sonu Nigam, Shreya Ghoshal	5:16
7.	"Raleva Raleva (Instrumental)"	—	—	5:02
Total length:				32:23

== Reception ==
Jeevi of Idlebrain.com wrote that "This film is a disappointment from Gireesh Sanghi (Owner of Vaartha newspaper). He is definitely capable of producing a better film". A critic from Rediff.com wrote that "Director S V Krishna Reddy, despite choosing a decent plot, fails to make Orey Pandu engrossing due to his predictable screenplay and pedestrian comedy". A critic from Full Hyderabad wrote that "In sum, this is hardly a kind of movie you'd expect of S V Krishna Reddy". A critic from Indiaglitz wrote that "The direction of S V Krishna Reddy has just no focus or a seamless approach. Everything is a hotchpotch. The result is, however, not: It is a clear disaster".
