= Sarkar Colony =

2011 Malayalam movie

- Sarkar Colony - Theatrical poster
- Directed by: V. S. Jayakrishna
- Written by: V. C. Ashok
- Produced by: Swetham Creations
- Starring: Mukesh; Devayani
- Cinematography: Saloo George
- Edited by: Manoj
- Music by: M. G. Sreekumar; Rajeev Alunkal(lyrics)
- Release date: 23 September 2011
- Country: India
- Language: Malayalam

Sarkar Colony is a 2011 Indian Malayalam-language film directed by V. S. Jayakrishna, starring Mukesh and Devayani as the lead pair.

== Plot ==
Sarkar Colony portrays the lives of ordinary government servants who with their meagre wages, struggle to make both ends meet. Some of them turn to some extra business ventures to earn some quick money.

== Cast ==
- Mukesh as Shivaramakrishnan
- Ashokan as Mukundan
- Jagadish as CI Lambodharan
- Suraj Venjaramood as Kunju Baby
- Jagathy Sreekumar as Puthan Purayil Padmanabha Pillai (Pu Pu Papi)/ Kunnummal Kuzhiyil Kammaran Kartha (Ku Ku Kaka)
- Devayani as Padmini Shivaramakrishnan (Puppy)
- Sona Nair as Thankam Mukundan
- Jaffar Idukki
- Kochu Preman
- Sajan Pallaruthy
- Sinan Kodungaloor
- Soniya as Thresiyakutty
- Narayanankutty
- T. P. Madhavan
- Geetha Nair
- Ambika Mohan
- Seema G. Nair
- Maya Moushmi
- Ponnamma Babu
- Kottayam Nazeer

== Soundtrack ==
Sarkar Colony

Soundtrack album by M. G. Sreekumar
- Released: 2011
- Recorded: Manorama Music
- Genre: World Music
- Label: Manorama Music
- Producer: Amritha Productions

The music of Sarkar Colony was composed by M. G. Sreekumar. The lyrics are written by Bichu Thirumala and Rajeev Alumkal.
The film has three songs. The singers in the film are M. G. Sreekumar, Nayana, Afsal and Madhu Balakrishnan.

No.	Title	Singer(s)	Length
1.	"Colonikku Kaavalaayi"	M. G. Sreekumar, Nayana
2.	"Kala Kala Kala"	Afsal
3.	"Vennilaavinazhake"	Madhu Balakrishnan

== Production ==
The film has been completed in a single schedule and in a record time of twenty three days. It was shot on locations in Thiruvananthapuram.
