= Rafi Resurrected =

Studio album by Sonu Nigam
- Released: 2008 (India)
- Recorded: 2008
- Genre: Hindi filmi
- Label: Saregama

Sonu Nigam chronology
Classically Mild (2008)	Rafi Resurrected (2008)	Yeh Naya Naya (2010)

Rafi Resurrected is a 2008 album sung by Sonu Nigam, released after his concert by the same name in London and elsewhere in Europe. This is a tribute album to the noted Indian playback singer Mohammad Rafi. The double album features 75 members of the City of Birmingham Symphony Orchestra, which arranged and orchestrated 18 of popular Rafi tracks in collaboration with Nigam.

== Overview ==
This is not the first time Sonu Nigam is giving the tribute to Mohammad Rafi, he even started his singing career at the age of 3 with the song "Kya hua tera vaada" by Mohammad Rafi.

The Album has numerous tracks and in a few tracks like "Mujhe teri mohabbat ka","Kya hua tera vaada" the female singer Gunjan joined him. The album was a hit in the United Kingdom and is very popular in India, Pakistan and many Urdu and Hindi speaking countries.

Sonu Nigam after giving Classically Mild came out with this album which is also an album, the music, the way he sang all the songs. The songs were played by City of Birmingham Symphony Orchestra which itself was an honour for an Indian artist
