= Angel Shijoy =

Indian voice actress

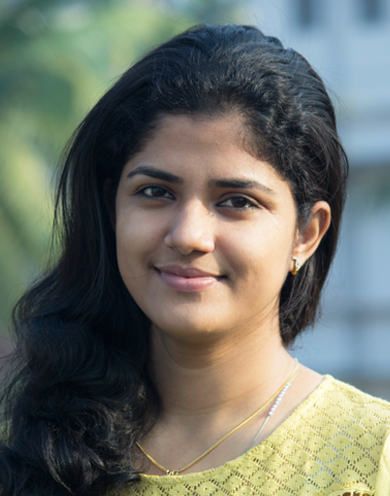
- Self-portrait photograph
- Born: Ernakulam, Kerala, India
- Occupation: Voice actress
- Years active: 2003–present
- Spouse: Kishore Kumar
- Website: www.angelsvoxspace.com

Angel Shijoy is an Indian voice artist who mainly uses her voice in Malayalam film and advertising industry. She has been lending her voice for cinema, web series, short films, documentaries and advertisements since age eight. Her voice was also used in the title track "Nattilengum Paattayi" for Radio Mango. Also, she is the promotional voice artist for Gold 101.3FM based in dubai since 10 years. She has lent her voice in more than 15000 advertisements including commercials and voice overs in Malayalam and English. Over 500 national and international clients from more than 18 countries believe her to be a valuable voice asset for their businesses. She had won the Kerala State TV Award twice by dubbing for tele serials in 2013 and 2016 and Kerala State Film Award for Best Dubbing Artist in 2015 for Haram.

== Career ==
She started her career when she was eight years old for Malayalam soap operas. She has dubbed in several Malayalam television serials before her movie career as a dubbing artist. She has dubbed for female actresses in Malayalam films. She dubbed for actress Rohini for a reality show Kadha ithuvare on Mazhavil Manorama in some episodes.

== Filmography ==
=== As voice artist ===
Year	Film	Actress	Character	Director	Ref.
2003	Vellithira	Child Artist		Bhadran	
2003	Ente Veedu Appuvinteyum	Child Artist		Sibi Malayil	
2004	Ee Snehatheerathu	Child Artist		Kaviyoor Sivaprasad	
2005	Maanikyan	Sruthi Lakshmi	Young Nirmala Menon	K. K. Haridas	
2005	Chanthupottu	Child Artist	Young Radhakrishnan	Lal Jose	
2005	Otta Nanayam	Muktha	Chinnu	Suresh Kannan	
2005	Rappakal	Child Artist		Kamal	
2006	Achante Ponnumakkal	Unknown		Akhilesh Guruvilas	
2007	Payum Puli	Unknown		Mohan Kupleri	
2007	July 4	Mangala	Shilpa Viswanathan	Joshi	
2007	Munna (Malayalam Version)	Ileana D'Cruz	Nidhi	Vamsi Paidipally	
2007	Indralokathe Rajakumari	Meera Jasmine	Aishwarya	Srinivasa Reddy	
2008	Parunthu	Unknown		M. Padmakumar	
2009	Colours	Roma Asrani	Pinky	Raj Babu	
2009	Red Chillies	Mrudula Murali	Varada Bhattadirippadu	Shaji Kailas	
2009	Hailesa	Muktha	Shalini	Thaha	
2009	Bhoomi Malayalam	Nanda		T. V. Chandran	
2009	Black Dalia	Parul Yadav	Linda D'Suza	Baburaj	
2009	Rahasya Police	Sindhu Menon	S.I. Rajan's wife	K. Madhu	
2009	Parayan Marannathu	Vidhya Mohan		Arun S. Bhaskar	
2009	Vairam	Dhanya Mary Varghese		M. A. Nishad	
2009	Kerala Cafe	Nithya Menon		Anjali Menon	
2009	Chemistry	Shilpa Bala		Viji Thampi	
2009	Kappal Muthalaali	Sarayu		Thaha	
2009	Paribhavam	Unknown		K. A. Devarajan	
2010	Penpattanam	Vishnupriya		V. M. Vinu	
2010	Kutty Srank	Kamalinee Mukherjee		Shaji N. Karun	
2010	Black Stallion	Julia George		Pramod Pappan	
2010	Four Friends	Sarayu		Saji Surendran	
2010	In Ghost House Inn	Lena		Lal	
2010	Mummy & Me	Archana Kavi		Jeethu Joseph	
2010	Nirakazhcha	Unknown		Aneesh J. Karinadu	
2010	Oridathoru Postman	Unknown		Shaji Asis	
2010	Cocktail	Aparna Nair		Arun Kumar Aravind	
2010	Malarvadi Arts Club	Apoorva Bose		Vineeth Sreenivasan	
2010	Aagathan	Charmy Kaur		Kamal	
2010	Nayakan	Dhanya Mary Varghese		Lijo Jose Pellissery	
2010	Janakan	Priyaa Lal		N.R. Sanjeev	
2010	Kaaryasthan	Lena		Thomson K. Thomas	
2010	Puthumukhangal	Unknown		Don Alex & Biju Majeed	
2010	Again Kasargod Khader Bhai	Sunitha Varma		Thulasidas	
2011	Innanu Aa Kalyanam	Saranya Mohan		Rajasenan	
2011	Pranayam	Dhanya Mary Varghese		Blessy	
2011	Orma Mathram	Priyanka Nair		Madhu Kaithapram	
2011	Kudumbasree Travels	Radhika		Kiran	
2011	Dr. Love	Vidhya Unni		Dr. Biju	
2011	Payyans	Anjali		Leo Thadevoos	
2011	Kayam	Aparna Nair		Anil K. Nair	
2011	Traffic	jivika pillappa		Rajesh Pillai	
2011	Salt N' Pepper	Archana Kavi		Aashiq Abu	
2011	Manushyamrugam	Oviya		Baburaj	
2011	Bangkok Summer	Richa Panai		Pramod Pappan	
2011	Veettilekkulla Vazhi	Dhanya Mary Varghese		Dr. Biju	
2011	Swapnamalika	Elena		K. A. Devarajan	
2011	Ithu Nammude Katha	Amala Paul		Rajesh Kannankara	
2011	Pachuvum Kovalanum	Sruthi Lakshmi		Thaha	
2012	Perinoru Makan	Saranya Mohan		Vinu Anand	
2012	Mayamohini	Lakshmi Rai		Jose Thomas	
2012	Spirit			Renjith	
2012	Mullamottum Munthiricharum	Meghna Raj		Aneesh Anwar	
2012	MLA Mani: Patham Classum Gusthiyum	Unknown		Sreejith Paleri	
2012	Ivan Megharoopan	Anumol		P. Balachandran	
2012	Casanovva	Dimple rose		Rosshan Andrrews	
2012	I Love Me	Isha Talwar		B. Unnikrishnan	
2012	Mullamottum Munthiricharum	Meghana Raj		Aneesh Anwar	
2012	Grandmaster	Mithra Kurian		B. Unnikrishnan	
2012	The King & the Commissioner			Shaji Kailas	
2012	Run Baby Run	Aparna Nair		Joshiy	
2013	KQ	Parvathi Omanakuttan		Baiju Ezhupunna	
2013	Daivathinte Swantham Cleetus	Honey Rose		G. Marthandan	
2013	Immanuel	Reenu Mathews		Laljose	
2013	Bycle Thieves	Aparna Gopinath		Jis Joy	
2013	Crocodile Love Story	Avanthika Mohan		Anoop Ramesh	
2013	Musafir	Divya Unni		Pramod Pappan	
2013	Pattam Pole	Malavika		Alagappan N.	
2013	Honey Bee	Archana Kavi		Lal Jr.	
2013	Vedivazhipadu	Mythili		Shambhu Purushothaman	
2013	Kadal Kadannu Oru Maathukutty	Alisha Muhammad		Renjith	
2013	Oru Indian Pranayakadha	Shafna		Sathyan Anthikad	
2013	ABCD	Aparna Gopinath		Martin Prakkat	
2013	Neelakasham Pachakadal Chuvanna Bhoomi	Avanthika Mohan		Sameer Thahir	
2013	5 Sundarikal	Isha Sharvani		Shyju Khalid; Sameer Thahir; Aashiq Abu; Amal Neerad; Anwar Rasheed	
2013	Kadhaveedu	Rituparna Sengupta	Rita	Sohan Lal	
2013	Nee Ko Njaa Cha	Rohini Mariam Idicula		Gireesh	
2013	Chewingum	Thinkal Bal		Praveen M. Sukumaran	
2013	Weaping Boy	Sheelu Abraham		Felix Joseph	
2013	Maad Dad	Dr. Pooja Gandhi		Revathy S Varmha	
2013	D Company ( Segment 3 : A Day of Judgement )	Tanu Roy	Zarina Mohammed	Vinod Vijayan	
2013	Cleopatra	Prerna		Rajan Shankaradi	
2013	Naayak (Malayalam Version)	Kajal Aggarwal		V. V. Vinayak	
2013	3 Dots	Anjana Menon		Sugeeth	
2014	God's Own Country	Isha Talwar		Vasudev Sanal	
2014	Bhaiyya Bhaiyya	Nisha Aggarwal		Johny Antony	
2014	Iyobinte Pusthakam			Amal Neerad	
2014	Happy Journey	Aparna Gopinath		Boban Samuel	
2014	8:20	Avanthika Mohan		Shyam Mohan	
2014	Ring Master	Honey Rose		Raffi	
2014	Hangover	Archana Gupta		Sreejith Sukumaran	
2015	Bhaskar the Rascal	Isha Talwar & Shalini Menon		Siddiq	
2015	Nee-Na	Unknown		Laljose	
2015	Mili	Sija Rose		Rajesh Pillai	
2015	Haram	Radhika Apte		Vinod Sukumaran	
2015	Two Countries			Shafi	
2015	Village Guys	Nakshatra		Shaan	
2015	Just Married	viviya		Sajan Johny	
2015	Kohinoor	Shraddha Srinath		Vinay Govind	
2015	Aana Mayil Ottakam	Reena		Jayakrishnan & Anil Sign	
2015	Jilebi	Leema Babu		Arun Shekhar	
2015	Urumbukal Urangarilla	Janaki Krishnan		Jiju Asokan	
2016	Pa Va	Prayaga Martin		Sooraj Tom	
2016	Ore Mukham	Prayaga Martin		Sajith Jagadnandan	
2016	Puthiya Niyamam	Nayanthara (Phone voice only)		A. K. Sajan	
2016	Monsoon Mangoes	Aishwarya Menon		Abi Varghese	
2016	Vettah	Jivika Pillappa		Rajesh Pillai	
2016	King Liar	Natasha Suri		Lal	
2016	James & Alice	Vedhika		Sujith Vaassudev	
2016	Welcome to Central Jail	Vedhika		Sundar Das	
2016	Swarna Kaduva	Poojitha Menon		Jose Thomas	
2016	Janatha Garage (Malayalam Version)	Nithya Menen		Koratala Siva	
2016	White	Unknown		Uday Ananthan	
2016	Pretham	Sharanya Menon		Ranjith Sankar	
2016	Yodhavu (Malayalam Version)	Rakul Preet Singh		Boyapati Srinu	
2016	Oru Pennu Kaanal Kadha (Malayalam Version)	Ritu Varma		Tharun Bhascker	
2016	Edavappathy	Utthara Unni		Lenin Rajendran	
2017	Comrade in America	Chandini Sreedharan		Amal Neerad	
2017	Fidaa (Malayalam Version)	Sai Pallavi		Shekhar Kammula	
2017	Ezra	Priya Anand		Jayakrishnan	
2017	Viswa vikhyatharaya payyanmar	Leema Babu		Rajesh Kannankara	
2017	Masterpiece	Varalaxmi Sarathkumar&Divya Pillai		Ajai Vasudev	
2017	Sakhavu	Aparna Gopinath		Sidhartha Siva	
2017	Avarude Raavukal	Milana Nagaraj		Shanil Muhammed	
2017	Chunkzz	Honey Rose		Omar Lulu	
2017	Velipadinte Pusthakam	Anna Rajan		Lal Jose	
2017	Adam Joan	Mishti		Jinu Abraham	
2017	Cappuccino	Anita Lukmance		Naushad	
2017	Solo	Sai Dhanshika		Bejoy Nambiar	
2017	Villain	Hansika		B. Unnikrishnan	
2017	DJ: Dhruvaraja Jagannadh(Malayalam Version)	Pooja Hegde		Harish Shankar	
2017	Magalir Mattum (Malayalam Version)	Jyothika		Bramma	
2018	Vikadakumaran	Rosin Jolly		Boban Samuel	
2018	Neerali	Parvati Nair		Ajoy Varma	
2018	Parole	Iniya		Sharath Sandith	
2018	Ranam	Isha Talwar		Nirmal Sahadev	
2018	Oru Kuttanadan Blog	Raai Laxmi		Sachi-Sethu	
2018	Neeli	Anjana Menon		Althaf Rahman	
2018	Orayiram Kinakkalal	Sakshi Agarwal		Pramod Mohan	
2018	Ente Mezhuthiri Athazhangal	Miya George		Sooraj Thomas	
2018	Kuttanadan Marpappa	Surabhi Santhosh		Sreejith Vijayan	
2018	Abrahaminte Santhathikal	Tarushi Jha		Shaji Padoor	
2018	Joseph	Unknown		M. Padmakumar	
2018	Kadha Paranja Kadha	Tarushi Jha		Siju Jawahar	
2018	Rosapoo	Shilpa Manjunath		Vinu Joseph	
2018	Angarajyathe Jimmanmar	Vinitha Koshy		Praveen Narayanan	
2018	Vallikudilile Vellakaaran	Alphy Panjikkaran		Duglus Alfred	
2019	Mikhael	Manjima Mohan		Haneef Adeni	
2019	Nine	Wamiqa Gabbi		Jenuse Mohamed	
2019	Kodathi Samaksham Balan Vakeel	Priya Anand		B Unnikrishnan	
2019	Soothrakkaran	Swasika		Anil Raj	
2019	Pengalila	Iniya		T. V. Chandran	
2019	Thakkol	Iniya		Kiron Prabhakaran	
2019	Madhura Raja	Shamna Kasim		Vysakh	
2019	Children's park	Sowmya Menon		Shafi	
2019	Mamangam	Kaniha		M. Padmakumar	
2019	Pattabiraman	Madhuri Braganza		Kannan Thamarakkulam	
2019	Kalki	Aparna Nair		Praveen Prabharam	
2019	Sye Raa Narasimha Reddy (Malayalam Version)	Nayanthara		Surender Reddy	
2019	Al Mallu	Varada Jishin		Boban Samuel	
2019	Driving License	Deepti Sati		Jean Paul Lal	
2020	Forensic	Reba Monica John		Akhil Paul, Anas Khan	
2021	Kurup	Sobhita Dhulipala		Srinath Rajendran	
2021	Cold Case	Aditi Balan		Tanu Balak	
2022	King fish	Durga Krishna		Anoop Menon	
2022	Aaraattu	Shraddha Srinath		B. Unnikrishnan	
2022	Mahaveeryar	Shanvi Srivastava		Abrid Shine	
2022	No Way Out	Raveena Nair		Nithin Devidas	
2022	Major (Malayalam Version)	Sobhita Dhulipala		Sashi Kiran Tikka	
2022	CBI 5	Kaniha		K. Madhu	
2022	Solamante Theneechakal	Neha Ros		Lal Jose	
2022	Doctor Strange in the Multiverse of Madness (Malayalam Version)	Elizabeth Olsen		Sam Raimi	
2022	Kumari	Shruthy Menon		Nirmal Sahadev	
2022	Rorschach	Ira		Nisam Basheer	
2022	Bermuda	Noorin Shereef		T. K. Rajeev Kumar	
2023	Christopher	Aditi Ravi		B. Unnikrishnan	
2023	Divorce	Amalendu		Mini IG	
2023	Adipurush (Malayalam Version)	Kriti Sanon		Om Raut	
2023	Kushi (Malayalam Version)	Samantha Ruth Prabhu		Shiva Nirvana	
2023	Kasargold	Malavika Sreenath		Mridul Nair	
2023	Salaar: Part 1 – Ceasefire (Malayalam Version)	Shruti Haasan		Prashanth Neel	
2023	Whine	Nisa NP		Saheer Abbas	
2023	Ganapath (Malayalam Version)	Kriti Sanon		Vikas Bahl	
2023	Maharani	Lizabeth		G. Marthandan	
2023	Thaal	Aradhya Ann		Rajasaagar	
2023	Hi Nanna (Malayalam Version)	Mrunal Thakur		Shouryuv	
2023	Dry Day (Malayalam Version)	Shriya Pilgaonkar		Saurabh Shukla	
2024	Thaanara	Deepti Sati		Haridas	
2024	Nadikar	Divya Pillai		Lal Jr.	
2024	DNA	Raai Laxmi		T. S. Suresh Babu	
2024	Nadanna Sambhavam	Athira Harikumar		Vishnu Narayan	
2024	Puspaka Vimanam	Namritha Mv		Ullas Krishna	
2024	Kalki 2898 AD (Malayalam Version)	Deepika Padukone		Nag Ashwin	
2024	Suryayude Shaniyazhcha (Malayalam Version)	Priyanka Mohan		Vivek Athreya	
2024	The Killer's Game (Malayalam Version)	Sofia Boutella		J. J. Perry	
2025	Kadhalikka Neramillai (Malayalam Version)	Nithya Menen		Kiruthiga Udhayanidhi	
2025	Oru Jaathi Jathakam	Isha Talwar		M. Mohanan	
2025	Rachel	Vanditha		Anandhini Bala	
2025	The Case Diary	Sakshi Agarwal		Dileep Narayanan	
2025	Bazooka	Bhama Arun	Saniya	Deeno Dennis	
2025	Besty	Sakshi Agarwal		Shanu Samad	
2025	HIT: The Third Case (Malayalam Version)	Komalee Prasad	Varsha	Sailesh Kolanu	
2025	Vrusshabha	Nayan Sarika		Nanda Kishore	
2025	Akhanda 2 (Malayalam Version)	Samyuktha Menon		Boyapati Sreenu	
2026	Chiram	Aiswarya Mithun Koroth		Sudheer	
2026	Spring	Aradhya Ann		Sreelal Narayanan	
2026	Crime 101(Malayalam Version)	Halle Berry	Sharon Colvin	Bart Layton	
2026	Toxic (Malayalam Version)	Rukmini Vasanth	Mellisa	Geetu Mohandas	

== Web series ==
=== As voice artist ===
Year	Web series	Actress	Character	Director	Ref.
2024	Indian Police Force - season 1	Shilpa Shetty	Tara Shetty IPS	Rohit Shetty	
2024	Waack Girls - Season 1	Mekhola Bose	Ishani	Sooni Taraporevala	
2025	The better sister - Season 1	Jessica Biel	Chloe Taylor	Olivia Milch	
2026	Exam	Dushara Vijayan	Jhansi	A. Sarkunam	

== Short films and serial operas ==
- Monnamidam - Rachana Narayanankutty
- Adheena - Mansi Joshi
- Tag - Anju Kurian
- The Other Half - Veda Hrudya Nadendla
- Burn My Body - Aparna Nair
- Hridyam - Sharanya Chinnasamy
- Anna Kareena - Catherine Reji(ep 32-109)
- Alphonsamma - Nikhila Vimal

== Documentary ==
- Cybertrap : The Dark Side Of Social Media Documentary (2020)

== Awards ==
- Kerala State Film Awards for best dubbing artist- Haram (2015)
- Kerala State Television Award for best dubbing artist- vishudha mariam thresya (2013)
- Kerala State Television Award for best Dubbing artist- ThapaswiniVishudhaAvuprasya (2016)

== See also ==
- List of Indian Dubbing Artists
- Kerala State Film Award for Best Dubbing Artist
