= Curry & Cyanide: The Jolly Joseph Case =

- The cover of the docuseries, depicting Jolly Joseph.
- Genre: True crime docuseries
- Based on: Koodathayi cyanide killings
- Written by: Shalini Ushadevi
- Directed by: Christo Tomy
- Composer: Tushar Lall
- Country of origin: India
- Original language: Malayalam

Production
- Cinematography: Shehnad Jalal; Hari K. Vedantam
- Editors: Sruthy Sukumaran; Praveen Prabhakar
- Production company: India Today Originals

Original release
- Network: Netflix
- Release: 22 December 2023

Curry & Cyanide: The Jolly Joseph Case is a true crime documentary directed by Christo Tomy, investigating six deaths in the same family and the woman at the center of the Koodathayi Cyanide killing case. It was released on Netflix on 22 December 2023.

== Background ==
The series is based on actual events in Koodathayi, a village in Kerala, India, between 2002 and 2016. Jolly Joseph, a mother and wife, was accused of poisoning six members of her family, including her first husband, with cyanide-laced food. She allegedly did this to inherit the family property and to not anyone let her know that she is inconclusive about her education, while she came from a farmer parents and she did not have a bachelor's and masters degree in college. It is based on first-person testimonials of individuals involved in the case.

== Reception ==
Anuj Kumar of India Today noted that the documentary is gripping in parts but does not offer new insights into the case, relying largely on already familiar information.

The Week described the series as engaging in parts, while pointing out that repetitive narration and limited psychological exploration reduce its overall impact.

Princy Xavier of Cinema Express wrote that the documentary is chilling and heartbreaking, but felt that the story of the victims required a more layered and sensitive treatment.

According to OTTPlay, the documentary was described as middling, stating that it does not fully succeed either as a detailed investigation or as an emotional narrative.

The Times of India rated the documentary 3 out of 5, calling it a chilling recount of the crimes while noting that it remains surface-level in its treatment of the case.

Times Now wrote that the documentary effectively conveys the disturbing nature of the crimes but lacks deeper investigative perspective.

Zoom TV stated that while the documentary provides a comprehensive recounting of events, it misses important perspectives that could have strengthened the narrative.

Shubhra Gupta of The Indian Express wrote that the documentary is a dissatisfying true-crime effort, stating that it inelegantly exhumes the Koodathayi killings and lacks narrative finesse and depth.

== Controversy ==
In January 2024, the second accused in the Koodathayi cyanide killings case, M. S. Mathew, approached a court in Kozhikode seeking a ban on the documentary. He argued that the documentary, released while the criminal trial was still pending, contained misleading material and could prejudice the judicial process.

In March 2024, the Kozhikode Additional Sessions Court rejected the plea and refused to halt the screening of the documentary on Netflix, holding that there were no sufficient grounds to grant a stay on its release.
