= Prasant Murali =

Indian actor

- Citizenship: Indian
- Occupation: Actor

Prasant Murali is an Indian actor who primarily works in Malayalam film industry. He is best known for his roles in Vayasethrayaayi? Muppathiee..!!, Ullozhukku and Rifle Club.

== Filmography ==
=== Films ===
Year	Title	Role	Notes	Ref.
2021	Aarkkariyam	Sajan	Debut film	
2021	Jan.E.Man	Chacko		
2022	Panthrandu	Jude		
2022	Sreedhanya Catering Service	Shinoy		
2022	Kooman	CPO Chandran		
2022	The Teacher	Kevin		
2023	Kasargold	Vijayan (Kumar)		
2024	Vayasethrayaayi? Muppathiee..!!	Brigeesh	Debut as lead actor	
2024	Ullozhukku	Thomaskutty		
2024	Rifle Club	Fr. Joshi		
2025	Lovely	Shinemon		
2026	Karuthal			
2026	Kalyanamaram			
