= Christo Tomy =

Indian filmmaker

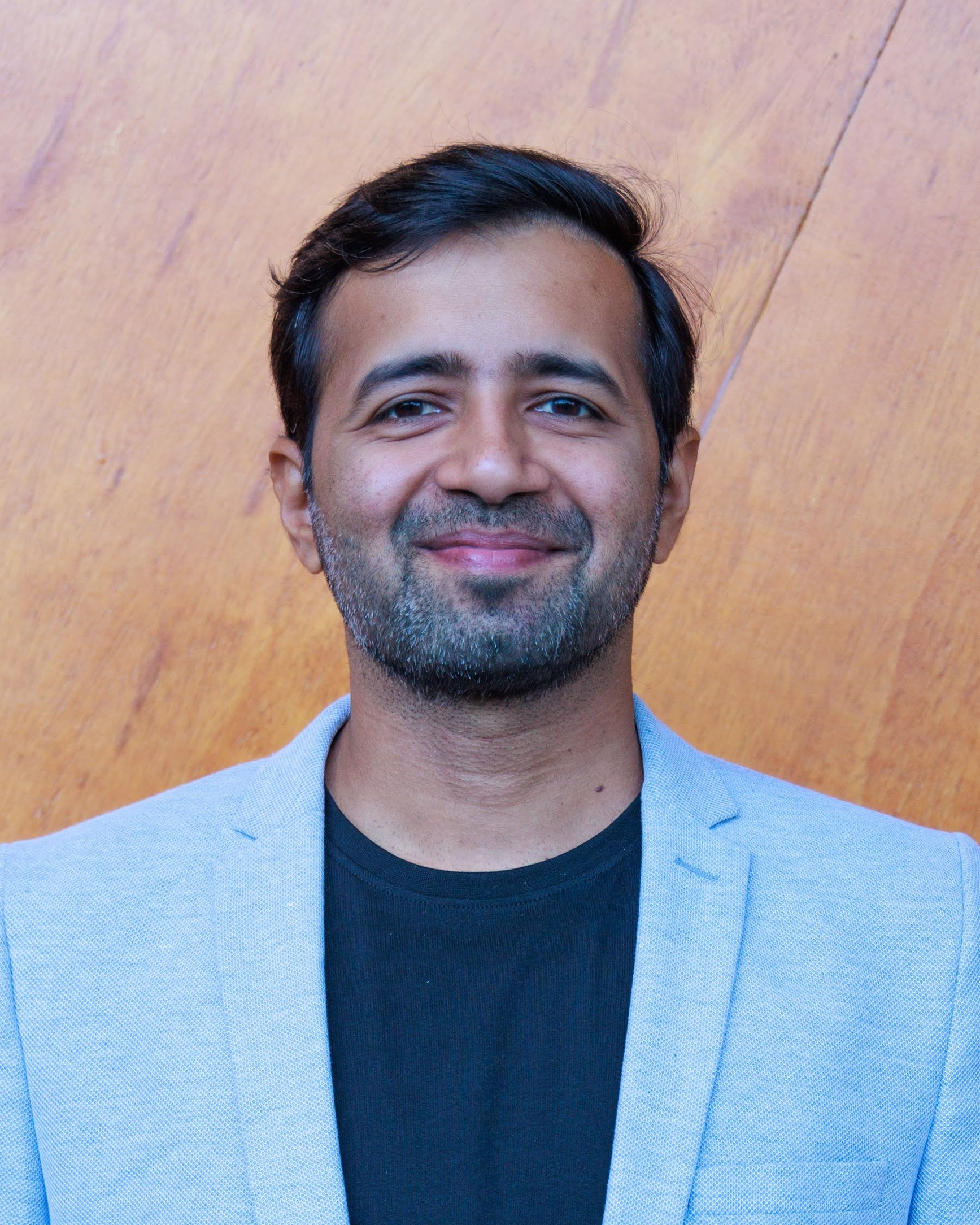
- Born: 27 September 1987 (age 38); Kochi, Kerala, India
- Education: Satyajit Ray Film and Television Institute; Sainik School Kazhakootam
- Occupations: Film director; screenwriter
- Years active: 2013-present
- Website: https://www.christotomy.com/

Christo Tomy is an Indian filmmaker who works in Malayalam cinema, with a portfolio that includes both short films and feature films. He is a three-time recipient of the National Film Award. In 2016, he received the Swarna Kamal for Best Direction (Non-Feature Film) for his short film Kamuki (Sweetheart). He also won the National Award for Debut Director in the non-feature category for his film Kanyaka (Virgin). In 2025, his debut feature film Ullozhukku was awarded the National Film Award for Best Malayalam Feature Film.

== Early life and education ==
Christo Tomy is an alumnus of Satyajit Ray Film and Television Institute, Kolkata and Sainik School Kazhakootam, Kerala.

== Career and achievements ==
=== National Film Awards ===
Christo Tomy gained national recognition with his short films, which have won him two National Film Awards. In 2016, he won the Swarna Kamal (Golden Lotus) for Best Director for his short film Kamuki (Sweetheart). His debut short film Kanyaka (Virgin) earned him the National Award for Best Debut Director in the non-feature category, receiving the Rajat Kamal (Silver Lotus). Kanyaka was also screened at the 44th International Film Festival of India (IFFI) in Goa.

=== Jury member ===
In recognition of his expertise and contributions to Indian cinema, he served as a member of the jury for the non-feature films at the 65th National Film Awards.

== Notable works ==
=== Short films and documentaries ===
Christo Tomy's first notable short film was Kanyaka (2013), which earned him a National Film Award for Best First Non-Feature Film of a Director. He directed Odvojen in 2014. His next short film, Kamuki (2015), was showcased at various international film festivals and went on to win the National Film Award for Best Non-Feature Film Direction. His work is known for its depth, creativity, and emotional resonance.

=== Curry & Cyanide: The Jolly Joseph Case ===
In 2023, Christo Tomy directed the Netflix documentary Curry & Cyanide: The Jolly Joseph Case. This documentary, based on the Koodathayi cyanide killings, achieved significant acclaim. The show reached the Global Top #2 position and remained in the Global Top Ten for three consecutive weeks. It amassed over 10 million views worldwide within three weeks of its release and featured in the Top Ten lists of more than 30 countries.

=== Ullozhukku ===
Christo Tomy's first feature film Ullozhukku (Undercurrent) was released in 2024 to positive reviews. Produced by Ronnie Screwvala, Honey Trehan, and Abhishek Chaubey, the film stars Parvathy Thiruvothu, Urvashi, and Arjun Radhakrishnan. Ullozhukku has been part of several prestigious programs, including the Film Independent's Global Media Makers LA Residency, the NFDC Co-Production Market - Film Bazaar, and the NFDC Screenwriters Lab. The project won the Cinestaan India's Storytellers Script Contest, India's largest feature film script contest, judged by eminent filmmakers Aamir Khan, Rajkumar Hirani, Anjum Rajabali, and Juhi Chaturvedi.

== Filmography ==
=== Feature films ===
Year	Title	Written by	Notes
2024	Ullozhukku	Himself	Debut film

=== Documentaries and short films ===
Year	Title	Written by	Notes
2013	Kanyaka (Virgin)	Himself	
2014	Odvojen (Apart)	Himself	(Note: Won 2nd place in the 'TV Story' category at the Interfer – International Media Festival in Apatin; screened at the 7th First Frame International Students Film Festival in 2014.)
2015	Kamuki (Sweetheart)	Himself	
2019	Dallas	Himself	(Note: Shot as part of Global Media Makers 2019 LA Residency program)
2020	A Window of Time - Lockdown Diaries	Himself (among others)	(Note: Directed one of 21 short video essays depicting the impact of the COVID-19 lockdown in 19 cities across 13 countries on four continents.)
2023	Curry & Cyanide: The Jolly Joseph Case	Shalini Ushadevi	

=== Musical videos ===
Year	Title	Written by	Notes
2014	You are Rot	Himself	
2014	Madakkam (Return)	Himself	(Note: Screened at the 7th International Documentary & Short Film Festival of Kerala (IDSFFK))

== Awards and accolades ==
National Film Award

- 2013: Best First Non-Feature Film of a Director – Kanyaka (Virgin)
- 2016: Best Direction (non-feature film) – Kamuki (Sweetheart)
- 2025: Best Malayalam Feature Film – Ullozhukku

Other Awards

- 2014: 7th International Short Film & Documentary Festival of Kerala (IDSFFK) – Best Music Video Award – You are Rot

== See also ==
- Malayalam cinema
- Cinema of India
