= Roshan Mathew =

Indian actor in Malayalam films

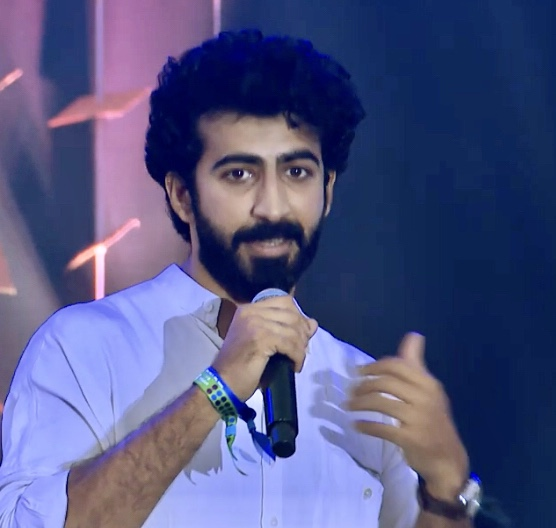
- Born: 22 March 1992 (age 34); Changanassery, Kerala, India
- Occupation: Actor
- Years active: 2015–present

Roshan Mathew (born 22 March 1992) is an Indian actor who works in Malayalam, Hindi and Tamil films. He began his career with numerous theatre productions based in Chennai and Mumbai. These include The Glass Menagerie directed by Rajit Kapoor and 07/07/07 directed by Faezeh Jalali.

Roshan had his first major role in the 2016 film Puthiya Niyamam and his career progressed with supporting roles in Aanandam (2016), Koode (2018), and Moothon (2019). For the latter two, he won two SIIMA Awards. He gained wider attention for his leading roles in the dramas Kappela (2020) and C U Soon (2021). Roshan has also appeared in the Hindi films Choked (2020) and Darlings (2022).

== Early life ==
Roshan hails from Changanassery, Kottayam in the Indian state of Kerala. His father Mathew Joseph is a bank manager in Canara Bank and his mother Regina Augustine is a retired PWD engineer. He studied in Kendriya Vidyalaya, Kottayam. After enrolling in School of Engineering, CUSAT in Kochi he dropped out after one year to study B.Sc Physics in Madras Christian College in Chennai. During his second year in college he developed an interest in acting, and after graduation joined the Drama School Mumbai.

== Career ==
=== Theatre ===
Roshan had been active on stage since school, but his first opportunity to work in professional theatre came when the Chennai-based theatre company Stagefright Productions came to Madras Christian College to audition actors for their production of Dirty Dancing in August 2010. Roshan bagged the role of Neal Kellerman, and the production went on stage at The Museum Theatre, Chennai in February 2011. He almost instantly fell in love with theatre, and went on to work with all the prominent Chennai-based companies in plays such as Kamala, Leap, The Uprising, Tughlaq, and Murder Me Always. He was also part of The Little Theatre's Christmas Pantomime in 2013. In Madras Christian College, Roshan along with his friends started a theatre group called Theatre No. 60 which staged many plays in different colleges in the state. Their production of Alfred Hitchcock/Patrick Hamilton's Rope was widely appreciated, and their revival of Jean-Paul Sartre's No Exit won Roshan the award for Best Director at a national level student theatre festival in 2013. After moving to Bombay in 2014, Roshan was part of The Drama School Mumbai's adaptation of Eugene Shwartz's The Dragon in 2016. After school, he went to join Faezeh Jalali's widely acclaimed production 07/07/07. He then appeared in Given directed by Padma Damodaran and written by Shivam Sharma, and Rajit Kapoor's adaptation of The Glass Menagerie. He has also directed an original play in Kochi called A Very Normal Family with a new team of artists based in the city.

=== Film ===
Roshan made his screen acting debut in a web series Tanlines. He made his film debut in 2016 in Puthiya Niyamam directed by A. K. Sajan, followed by a small role in Adi Kapyare Kootamani. It was Ganesh Raj's Aanandam (2016) that put Roshan on the map. The coming-of-age movie opened to packed houses and was one of the biggest successes of the year in Malayalam. In 2018, he essayed a role in Koode directed by Anjali Menon. His other notable performances came in "Thottappan" (2019) alongside Vinayakan, in Viswasapoorvam Mansoor (2017), and Orayiram Kinakkalal (2018). In 2019, he shot to fame by playing Ameer opposite Nivin Pauly in Geetu Mohandas's film Moothon. His upcoming films are "Varthamanam", directed by Sidhartha Siva along with Parvathy, his debut Tamil film Cobra directed by R Ajay Gnanamuthu alongside Vikram. His recently released film is Netflix's Choked directed by Anurag Kashyap alongside Saiyami Kher, Kappela: where he played the lead role alongside Anna Ben and Sreenath Bhasi which gained positive reviews and also C U Soon alongside Fahadh Faasil. His performance in the latest Malayalam movie Kuruthi alongside Prithviraj Sukumaran also garnered much attention.

== Filmography ==
Key
†	Denotes films that have not yet been released

=== Films ===
- All films are in Malayalam unless otherwise noted.

List of Roshan Mathew film credits
Year	Title	Role	Notes
2015	Adi Kapyare Kootamani	Prem Raj	
2016	Puthiya Niyamam	Aryan	
2016	Aanandam	Gautham Roy / Rockstar Gautham	
2017	Viswasapoorvam Mansoor	Mansoor	
2017	Kadam Kadha	Maneesh	
2017	Matchbox	Ernesto Narendran / Ambu	
2017	Orayiram Kinakkalal	Jaison	
2018	Koode	Krish	
2019	Thottappan	Ismail	
2019	Moothon	Ameer	
2020	Kappela	Vishnu	
2020	Choked	Sushant Pillai	Hindi film
2020	C U Soon	Jimmy Kurian	
2021	Varthamanam	Amal	
2021	Aanum Pennum	Cherukkan	Segment: Rani
2021	Kuruthi	Ibrahim	
2022	Night Drive	Georgy Jacob	
2022	Darlings	Zulfi	Hindi film, released on Netflix
2022	Cobra	Rajiv Rishi	Tamil film
2022	Oru Thekkan Thallu Case	Podiyan Pilla	
2022	Kotthu	Sumesh	
2022	Chathuram	Balthazar	
2022	Gold	Manu	
2023	Pookkaalam	Johnymon	
2023	Neelavelicham	Sasi Kumar	
2023	Dhoomam	Siddharth	
2023	Maharani	Vijeesh	
2023	Paradise	Kesav	Sri Lankan-Indian film
2024	Ulajh	Sebin Josephkutty	Hindi film
2025	Ronth	CPO Dinnath	
2025	Ithiri Neram	Anish Thomas	
2026	Chatha Pacha	Vetri	
2026	Uyir	SI Ajeeb	
TBA	Chera †	TBA	Filming

=== Voice actor ===
Year	Title	Role	Notes
2023	Valatty	Tomy (voice)	

=== Screenwriter ===
Year	Title	Notes
2025	Written & Directed by God	

=== Dubbing ===
Year	Title	Dubbed for	Character	Language	Notes
2024	Ullozhukku	Arjun Radhakrishnan	Rajeev	Malayalam	Kerala State Film Award for Best Dubbing Artist

=== Television ===
Key
†	Denotes television productions that have not yet been released

List of Roshan Mathew series credits
Year	Title	Role	Language	Platform	Notes
2015	Tanlines	Dan	English	Sony LIV	12 episodes
2023	Master Peace	Adam	Malayalam	Disney+ Hotstar	Cameo in 5th episode
2024	Poacher	Alan	Malayalam	Prime Video	
2025	Kankhajura	Ashu	Hindi	SonyLiv	

== Awards and nominations ==
List of awards and nominations received by Roshan Mathew
Year	Award	Category	Nominated work	Result	Ref.
2019	CPC Cine Awards	Best Actor in a Character Role	Moothon	Won	
2020	Filmfare OTT Awards	Best Supporting Actor in a Web Original Film	Choked	Nominated	
2018	SIIMA Awards	Best Actor in a Supporting Role (Malayalam)	Koode	Won	
2019	SIIMA Awards	Best Performance by an Actor in a Negative Role (Malayalam)	Thottappan	Nominated	
2019	SIIMA Awards	Best Actor in a Supporting Role (Malayalam)	Moothon	Won	
2020	SIIMA Awards	Best Performance by an Actor in a Negative Role (Malayalam)	Kappela	Nominated	
2020	SIIMA Awards	Best Actor in a Supporting Role (Malayalam)	C U Soon	Nominated	
2024	54th Kerala State Film Awards	Best Dubbing Artist	Ullozhukku (dubbed for Arjun Radhakrishnan)	Won	
