= Adhyan =

2015 Indian film by Ram Manoj Kumar

- Official Movie Poster
- Directed by: Ram Manoj Kumar
- Written by: Ram Manoj Kumar
- Produced by: T. Ranjith Kumar
- Starring: Abhimanyu Nallamuthu; Sakshi Agarwal
- Cinematography: M. Srinivasan
- Edited by: Kumaravel
- Music by: Hari G. Rajasekar
- Production company: Rathang Pictures
- Release date: 30 October 2015
- Running time: 105 minutes
- Country: India
- Language: Tamil

Adhyan (transl. Who Knows Everything) is a 2015 Indian Tamil-language romantic action film written and directed by Ram Manoj Kumar.

It has been dubbed into Hindi and was released as Daring Baaz (transl. Daring Man) on 30 May 2017 by Ad-Wise Media Digital.

== Cast ==
- Abhimanyu Nallamuthu as Adhyan
- Sakshi Agarwal as Anamika
- Jenish as Veeram
- Veerapandiyan
- Manheswaran
- Jayachandran

== Reception ==
Samayam gave the film a rating of two-and-a-half out of five and praised the performance of newcomer Abhimanyu. Maalaimalar gave the film a rating of thirty-seven out of a hundred and praised the performances of the lead cast while criticizing the screenplay". A critic from The New Indian Express wrote that "Adhyan is, at the most, a promising work of a debutant".
