= Viswasapoorvam Mansoor =

- Theatrical release poster
- Directed by: P. T. Kunju Muhammed
- Screenplay by: P. T. Kunju Muhammed
- Story by: Jayakrishnan Kavil
- Produced by: K. V. Mohanan
- Starring: Roshan Mathew; Asha Sarath; Prayaga Martin; Zarina Wahab; Rahaneesh Bin Rafeeque
- Cinematography: M. J. Radhakrishnan
- Edited by: Don Max
- Music by: Ramesh Narayan
- Production company: Virginplus Movies
- Distributed by: Virginplus Movies Release
- Release date: 24 June 2017 (Kerala)
- Country: India
- Language: Malayalam

Viswasapoorvam Mansoor is a 2017 Indian Malayalam-language film written and directed by P. T. Kunju Muhammed. It stars Roshan Mathew, Prayaga Martin, Asha Sarath, and Zarina Wahab. The film was released in Kerala on 24 June 2017.

== Cast ==
- Roshan Mathew as Mansoor
- Prayaga Martin as Mumthaz
- Asha Sarath as Fathibi
- Zarina Wahab as Saira Bhanu
- Renji Panicker as Kalanthan Haji
- Akash V H as Firoz
- V. K. Sreeraman
- Leona Lishoy as Soumya
- Santhosh Keezhattoor
- Sunil Sukhada
- Shivaji Guruvayoor
- Rahaneesh Bin Rafeeque

== Production ==
Roshan Mathew and Prayaga Martin were signed to play the lead pair, along with Gautami and Swetha Menon. However, the latter left due to prior commitments in television shows and was replaced by Asha Sarath. Zarina Wahab was signed to play the role of Saira Bhanu. Principal photography began in February 2017 in Thalassery.

== Soundtrack ==
Viswasapoorvam Mansoor

Soundtrack album by Ramesh Narayan
- Released: 7 June 2017
- Genre: Feature film soundtrack
- Length: 13:47
- Language: Malayalam
- Label: Mathrubhumi Music

The film features a soundtrack composed by Ramesh Narayan, with lyrics penned by Premdas Guruvayur, Prabha Varma and Rafeeq Ahammed. The songs were released on 7 June 2017 by Mathrubhumi Music via Kappa TV's YouTube channel. The song "Poi Maranja Kalam" won K. J. Yesudas a National Film Award for Best Male Playback Singer at the 65th National Film Awards.

Track list
No.	Title	Lyrics	Singer(s)	Length
1.	"Poi Maranja Kalam"	Premdas Guruvayoor	K. J. Yesudas	3:48
2.	"Ariyaykayalalla"	Prabha Varma	Madhushree Narayan, Yazin Nizar	3:55
3.	"Nilavinte"	Rafeeq Ahammed	K. S. Chithra	2:58
4.	"The Wedding Song (Idanenchil Idaykkakal)"	Rafeeq Ahammed	Franco, Yazin Nizar, Anitha Shaiq	3:02
Total length:				13:47
