= Vayasethrayaayi? Muppathiee..!! =

Upcoming 2024 Malayalam comedy drama film by Pappan Narippatta

- Poster
- Directed by: Pappan Narippatta
- Screenplay by: U.C. Shiju; Faizal Abdulla
- Story by: U.C. Shiju
- Produced by: Ajayan E
- Starring: Prasant Murali; Akshara Raj
- Cinematography: Shameer Gibran
- Edited by: Riyas K. Badhar
- Music by: Sanfeer K; Sibu Sukumaran
- Release date: 29 March 2024
- Country: India
- Language: Malayalam

Vayasethrayaayi? Muppathiee..!! is a 2024 Malayalam comedy drama film directed by Pappan Narippatta, written by U.C.Shiju and Faizal Abdulla for Ajayan E, the producer. It stars Prasant Murali as the lead character, with supporting actors Manju Pathrose, Jayakumar Parameswaran Pillai, Savithri Sreedharan, V. Suresh Thampanoor and Nirmal Palazhi.

The first day of shooting started on 16 February 2023. The film was released on 29 March 2024. Saina Play acquired the digital rights and began streaming it on 19 July 2024.

== Premise ==
Vayasethrayaayi? Muppathiee..!! is the story of 37 years old Brigeesh, in search of a bride, even though he has crossed his marriage age. His attempt to marry and settle in life gets postponed everytime as his bride search always ends in disaster for Brigeesh.

== Cast ==
- Prasant Murali as Brigeesh
- Mareena Michael Kurisingal as Sumangala
- Manju Pathrose as Sulu
- Jayakumar Parameswaran Pillai as Hitler, Sulu brother
- U.C. Shiju as Kamalakshan
- Akshara Raj as Kaveri
- Kalabhavan Sariga as Jisha
- Sumesh Bhaskar as Jisha husband
- Aritha as Sarala
- Remya Suresh as Party Branch Secretary Sakhavu Vanaja
- Unni Raja as Mandhan Babu
- Pradeep Balan as Brakuttan
- Sreejith as Link Gopalan
- Jayakumar as Dr.Tharanamsu
- Narayaniamma as Muthassi
- Chitra Nair as Babitha
- Savithri Sreedharan as Vilasini
- Kunjikannan Cheruvathur as Chorian Nanu
- V. Suresh Thampanoor as Broker Kumaran
- Nirmal Palazhi as Adv. Narayanan Potti
- Kamala Bhaskar as Mariyumma

== Production ==
The promotional video song of the film was released by Saregama, with Anurag Ram as music director for the lyrics written by Vishnu Subash-Raag Sagar on 21 January. Sanfeer K, the director of 2022 film Peace, composed the background score and sound design, while Sibu Sukumaran joined Sanfeer K in composing songs.

== Soundtrack ==
Vayasethrayaayi? Muppathiee..

Soundtrack album by Sibu Sukumaran

No.	Title	Singer(s)	Length
1.	"Puyyappala Thakkarathinu "	Vineeth Sreenivasan	2:41
2.	"Kottarakkettinakatho"	Vaikom Vijayalakshmi	3:43
3.	"Swapna Sundari"	S J Sreeram	2:12
4.	"Para Niraye Ponnunde"	Vineeth Sreenivasan	3:33
5.	"Pookka Kombathum"	Firoz Kunnumbarambil, Sibu Sukumaran, Rashmi Panikar	5:00
6.	"Swapna Sundari (Version 2)"	Sajeer Koppam	2:16
7.	"Kottarakkettinakatho (Version 2)"	Sajeer Koppam	3:43
8.	"Kattakkalipp"	Aravind Nair	2:38
Total length:			24:26
