= Good Shepherd Convent, Chennai =

The Good Shepherd Convent

Location
- Chennai, Tamil Nadu; India
- Coordinates: 13.065553°N 80.244918°E

Information
- Type: private
- Established: 1923
- Faculty: 95
- Enrollment: 1000
- Campus: Urban
- Website: http://goodshepherdchennai.org/

The Good Shepherd Convent is an English-medium high school in Chennai, Tamil Nadu, India.

== History ==
The school was established in 1925 in India, the roots of the convent grew as early as in 1835 in France when Sister Mary Euphrasia, sowed the seeds for the growth of the institution which has now become one of the premier group of educational institutions in Chennai and other parts of the country.

== Notable alumni ==
- Vyjayantimala - Bollywood actress
- Sudha Shah - one of the first women cricketers in India
- Shriya Reddy - VJ and actress
- Sudha Ragunathan - vocalist
- Chitra Ramanathan - Contemporary Indian American Visual Artist
- Paloma Rao - VJ
- Radhika - Kollywood actress
- Shweta Mohan-Playback Singer
- Reshmi Menon - Kollywood actress
- Rati Agnihotri - Indian actress
- Dipika Pallikal Karthik - Indian Squash Player
- Sakshi Agarwal-Kollywood actress and model
