= Uyir (2026 film) =

2026 Indian Malayalam language film

- Theatrical release poster
- Directed by: M. Padmakumar
- Written by: Shaji Maarad; Nikhil K. menon
- Produced by: Santhosh Thrivikraman
- Starring: Roshan Mathew; Baiju Santhosh; Athulya Chandra
- Cinematography: Ajay David Kachappilly
- Edited by: Ranjan Abraham
- Music by: Manikandan Ayyappa
- Production company: Vow Cinemas
- Distributed by: Century Films; The Plot Pictures
- Release date: 26 June 2026
- Running time: 145 minutes
- Country: India
- Language: Malayalam

Uyir is a 2026 Indian Malayalam-language investigation crime thriller film directed by M. Padmakumar. The film stars Baiju Santosh, Roshan Mathew and Athulya Chandra in the lead role.

== Cast ==
- Roshan Mathew as Probation SI Ajeeb Rahman
- Baiju Santhosh as ASI Joy Thomas
- Athulya Chandra as Shehna
- Shruthy Menon as Shobha
- Baby Mithra Sanjay as Meenu
- Vineeth Thattil David as SI Nandakumar G.
- Santhosh Thrivikraman as CI Shivakumar
- Saiyami Kher as PI Keerti Deshpande, Maharashtra Police
- Vinod Sagar as Bhuvanesh Kumar
- Shaju Sreedhar as ASI Madhu K.T
- Srikant Murali as Forensic Surgen, Dr.C.N.Harisankar
- Divya M. Nair as Molly Joy

== Reception ==
Aiswarya Sudha of The Times of India said that "Despite a few uneven stretches, Uyir deserves appreciation for its emotional sincerity. It may not be a flawless investigative thriller, but it leaves behind a sense of sadness, satisfaction, and moral discomfort." Vivek Santhosh of The New Indian Express said that "While it remains a functional crime drama with competent technical values, it ultimately sacrifices true emotional weight in favour of formulaic resolutions." S.R. Praveen of The Hindu said that "With its unimaginative and dated approach, Uyir does not break any ground and ends up as a run-of-the-mill police procedural." Vivek Santhosh of the Cinema Express said that "The biggest thing holding Uyir back is that it rarely catches you off guard. By the end, you're left appreciating the sincerity of the performances and the emotional ending more than the mystery itself."
