= Geetha (2019 film) =

2019 Indian Kannada-language action drama film

- Theatrical Poster
- Directed by: Vijay Naagendra
- Written by: Vijay Naagendra
- Produced by: Syed Salam; Shilpa Ganesh
- Starring: Ganesh; Shanvi Srivastava; Prayaga Martin
- Cinematography: Shreesha Kuduvalli
- Edited by: Jnaanesh B. Matad
- Music by: Anup Rubens
- Production companies: S.S Films; Golden Movies
- Release date: 27 September 2019
- Country: India
- Language: Kannada

Geetha is a 2019 Indian Kannada action drama film written and directed by debutant Vijay Naagendra starring Ganesh, Shanvi Srivastava and Prayaga Martin in lead roles. Anup Rubens handle the music for the movie. The film derives its name from 1981 film Geetha, directed by Shankar Nag, however, the film team has clarified the content is very different and revolves around the famous Gokak Agitation.

== Plot ==
Set against the backdrop of the Gokak Chaluvali (the language rights agitation in the 1980s in Karnataka), this movie tells the story of Akash and Geetha whose paths keep crossing as they bump into each other at different stages of their lives.

== Cast ==
- Ganesh as Aakaash and younger Shankar
  - Devaraj as elder Shankar
- Shanvi Srivastava as Priya and younger Aarthi
  - Swathi as elder Aarthi
- Prayaga Martin as Geethanjali
  - Parvathy Arun as younger Geethanjali
  - Sudharani as elder Geethanjali
- Rangayana Raghu as Photo Raja
- Achyuth Kumar as Geetha's father
- Ravishankar Gowda as Ramesha
- Vishal Hegde as Prem
- Ravi Bhat as Priya's father
- Vihaan Ganesh as Aakaash
- K S Shridhar as Geethanjali's Father
- Bala Rajwadi as a cop

== Production ==
The film is a joint venture of Syed Salam Films and Ganesh's home banner Golden Movies. The movie is shot in Kolkata, Manali and Bangalore.

== Soundtrack ==
Geetha

Soundtrack album by Anup Rubens
- Genre: Feature film soundtrack
- Language: Kannada
- Label: Anand Audio
- Producer: Anup Rubens

The film's score and soundtrack is composed by Anup Rubens. The music rights are acquired by Anand Audio.

Tracklist
| No. | Title | Lyrics | Singer(s) | Length |
|---|---|---|---|---|
| 1. | "Kannadiga" | Santhosh Ananddram | Puneeth Rajkumar | 3:50 |
| 2. | "Helade Kelade" | Ghouse Peer | Rajesh Krishnan, Ananya Bhat | 4:30 |
| 3. | "Geetha Nanna Geetha" (Title Track) | Santhosh Ananddram | Sonu Nigam | 5:24 |
| 4. | "Party Maadu" | Chethan | Shashank Sheshagiri | 4:04 |
| 5. | "Male Male idhu" | Santhosh Ananddram | Vijay Prakash, Nutana Mohan | 4:23 |
| 6. | "Kanninda Aagaaga" | Ghouse Peer | Chinmayi, Sai Charan | 4:06 |

== Reception ==
A critic of The Times of India rated 3.5 out of 5 and wrote that "With this film, Vijaynaagendra emerges as a promising name, as he has given a heartfelt narrative that strikes the right chords". Shashi Prasad of Deccan Chronicle stated that "To wrap it up, Geetha promises some good memories to cherish in the end". A Sharadhaa of Cinema Express gave 4 stars out of 5 star and noted that "Overall, Geetha' is a perfect amalgam of two beautiful love stories told almost flawlessly".
