= Ente Mezhuthiri Athazhangal =

2018 film by Sooraj Thomas

- Theatrical release poster
- Directed by: Sooraj Tom
- Written by: Anoop Menon
- Produced by: Noble Jose
- Starring: Anoop Menon; Miya; Dileesh Pothan; Lal Jose; Alencier Ley Lopez; Baiju; V. K. Prakash; Hannah Reji Koshy; Srikant Murali; Nisa NP
- Cinematography: Jithu Damodar
- Edited by: Zian Sreekanth
- Music by: Rahul Raj
- Production company: 999 Entertainments
- Distributed by: 999 Cinemas Release
- Release date: 27 July 2018
- Country: India
- Language: Malayalam

Ente Mezhuthiri Athazhangal (transl. My candle light dinners) is a 2018 Indian Malayalam-language romantic comedy film directed by Sooraj Tom. It was written by Anoop Menon who also stars in the lead role alongside Miya. The film also features an ensemble supporting cast that includes Dileesh Pothan, Lal Jose, Baiju, Alencier Ley Lopez, V. K. Prakash, Hannah Reji Koshy, Srikant Murali and Nisa NP, The songs featured in the film are composed by M. Jayachandran. Anoop Menon signed Rahul Raj to compose the background score of the movie. The movie was released on 27 July 2018 to theatres and was well acclaimed.

== Cast ==
- Anoop Menon as Sanjay Paul
- Miya as Anjali Menon (Dubbed by Angel Shijoy)
- Anil Murali as Shoukath Sahib
- Hannah Reji Koshy as Thara Antone
- Nirmal Palazhi as Bobby
- Nisa NP as Thulasi Damodaran
- Srikant Murali as Narayanan Nair
- Nandan Unni as Krishnan
- Manju Sunichen as Gracy Stephen
- Baiju as Stephen Maiyyeruthottathil
- Tini Tom as Renees
- Alencier Ley Lopez as Itty Chandy/T.K Alexander
- Rahul Madhav as Adhi Menon
- Dileesh Pothan as Sony George Thyikkadan
- Madhuri Braganza as Paromita Shome
- Lal Jose as Agusthis Theodus/Eppachan
- Anoop Sivasenan as Shibu
- V. K. Prakash as Anthony Orikkyalpattu
- George Ellor as George

== Music ==
The film score is composed, arranged and produced by Rahul Raj, while the five songs featured in the film are composed by M. Jayachandran and written by Rafeeq Ahamed.

- Venalum Varshavum ...
- Kaattil ee Jalakam ...
- Neela Neela Mizhikalo ....
- Marayatholi Kannal ...
- Oru Paarvayil ....

== Release ==
Ente Mezhuthiri Athazhangal was released on 27 July 2018.
