= Magic Lamp (film) =

- Directed by: Haridas
- Written by: Ranjith; Udaykrishna–Sibi K. Thomas (Dialogues)
- Screenplay by: Udaykrishna–Sibi K. Thomas
- Produced by: Cherupuzha Jose
- Starring: Jayaram; Meena; Sangeetha; Divya Unni; Kalabhavan Mani
- Cinematography: Vipin Mohan
- Edited by: P. C. Mohanan
- Music by: Ouseppachan
- Production company: Kalamandir Arts
- Distributed by: Kalamandir Arts
- Release date: 7 June 2008
- Country: India
- Language: Malayalam

Magic Lamp is a 2008 Indian Malayalam-language Comedy drama film directed by K. K. Haridas and produced by Cherupuzha Jose. The film stars Jayaram in four roles, with Meena, Sangeetha, Divya Unni and Kalabhavan Mani appears in lead roles. The film has musical score by Ouseppachan. Magic Lamp is a multi-starrer comedy flick.

== Plot ==
Anupama gets a photo of a person while travelling in Bengaluru. She wants to get a job as an air hostess, but her family believes that women shouldn't work. Rather, they want Anupama to marry a 'mora cherukkan' (fiancé) already chosen for her. To escape from marriage, she lies to her family that she is in love with someone else, who turns out to be a coach in a college named Sunny Kuruvila.

Anupama's uncle Vikram Dada goes to assault Sunny, but Sunny fights back against Vikram due to loss of his lover of six years, Alphonsa. Anupama changes her lover's name to Dr. Nandakumar, a stuttering doctor, whose wife Viji leaves him due to the same misunderstanding.

Anupama reveals her fake love to Lalan, a no-case lawyer, he tells the family that Anupama was raped in Goa by a Malayali. Word of this eventually reaches another character, Chandrasenan. Senan sees the remaining two doppelgangers, and teams up together to make a scheme to know the truth.

Senan goes to Anupama's house first to marry her, and gets in posing as a tree buyer. When Anupama gets her air hostess job, Senan understands that she lied about her lovers in order to land the job. She then tells Lalan that she used him as well, however this angers Lalan, so he and Senan scheme to prevent her from travelling to her new job. Lalan's scheme works and Anupama gets kidnapped by Mumbai thugs, but she frames Senan for the kidnapping. Senan tells Sunny to pretend he is him, as Senan is the only person who can save her. The police arrest Sunny thinking as Senan by Sunny's future brother-in-law. Relations get better between Alphonsa and Sunny, and Senan rescues Anupama. Anupama proposes to Senan, however he turns her down. In order to win Senan over and convince him to marry her, she feigns pregnancy. Senan goes to Dr. Nandakumar's house as the doctor and gets Viji and his son. On Sunny's engagement day a final fight happens between Manikandan, the Mumbai thugs and the doctor's father-in-law's thugs. In the process they reveal that they are not one, but three people who happen to look identical (Senan, Sunny, Dr. Nandakumar). Everyone gets their brides and goes to Bengaluru and sees that the real owner of the photo was living all the time in Bengaluru.

== Cast ==
- Jayaram in quadruple role as:
  - Chandrasenan
  - Sunny Kuruvilla
  - Dr. Nandakumar
  - Khalid (cameo)
- Meena as Anupama
- Sangeetha as Alphonsa, Sunny Kuruvilla's Love interest and Fiancée
- Divya Unni as Viji, Dr. Nandakumar's Wife
- Khushbu as Khalid's wife
- Kalabhavan Mani as Chalakkudy Manikandan
- Oduvil Unnikrishnan as Achutha Menon
- Baiju as Dr. Mohanakrishnan, a Veterinarian
- Kottayam Nazeer as Dr. Omanakuttan, an Ayurvedic doctor
- Jagathy Sreekumar as Adv. Lalan
- Janardhanan as Ananthan Menon
- C. I. Paul as Balan Menon
- K. P. A. C. Lalitha as Bharathiyamma
- Indrans as Sankaranunni
- Augustine as Vikram Dada Bhai
- Kalabhavan Shajohn
- Mamukkoya as Mavu Koya
- Manga Mahesh
- Tosh Christy
- Priyanka as Maid
- Ramu as Alphonsa's elder brother
- Kozhikode Narayanan Nair as Viji's father
- Motta Rajendran as Goon
- Dimple Rose
