= Besty (film) =

Indian family thriller film

- Theatrical release poster
- Directed by: Shanu Samad
- Written by: Shanu Samad
- Story by: Ponnani Azees
- Produced by: K V Abdul Nazar
- Starring: Ashkar Saudan; Shaheen Siddique; Sakshi Agarwal; Sravana
- Cinematography: Jiju Sunny
- Edited by: John Kutty
- Music by: Songs; Ouseppachan; Anwar Aman; Mohsin Kurukkal; Ashraf Manjeri; Shubham Shukla; BGM; Ouseppachan
- Production company: Benzy Productions
- Release date: 24 January 2025
- Running time: 138 minutes
- Country: India
- Language: Malayalam
- Budget: ₹4.81 crore

Besty is a 2025 Indian Malayalam-language family thriller film, written and directed by Shanu Samad. The film stars Ashkar Saudan, Shaheen Siddique, Sakshi Agarwal, and Sravana. The film was released on 24 January 2025.

== Summary ==
Besty is the story a couple who had a divorce due to misunderstandings and a friend who requests their help in his personal life.

== Cast ==
- Ashkar Saudan - Remis
- Shaheen Siddique - Faisi
- Sakshi Agarwal - Shahina
- Sravana - Femi
- Jaffar Idukki - Kolapulli Appan
- Gokulan - Fakru Aliyan
- Sudheer Karamana - Siddikoya
- Suresh Krishna - Jabbar
- Sadiq - Ahammad Haji
- Nirmal Palazhi - Sabu
- Hareesh Kanaran - Hamzamon
- Naseer Sankranthi - Mukri
- Joy Mathew - Ustad
- Unni Rajah - As the lover
- Sona Nair
- Mareena Michael Kurisingal
- Abu Salim
- M. A. Nishad as Uppa of Remis

== Production ==
The songs 'Pathiripattu' and 'Manchadi Kadavil' were released on 5 January 2025, while the song 'Vellamanjinte' was released on 11 January 2025. The team done a different promotion of the film at Kozhikode Beach. The teaser of the film was released on 15 January 2025. Jiju Sunny, the cinematographer of acclaimed Tamil film Parking was signed as the cameraman. Ouseppachan, Anwar Aman, Mohsin Kurukkal, Ashraf Manjeri and Shubham Shukla were signed as song composers while Ouseppachan is the background music composer. Veteran Shibu Chakravarthy is one of the lyricists. The film was shot at the location of Kullu Manali, Mumbai, Mangalore, Kozhikode and Ponnani. Benzy release acquired the distribution of the film. The producer also gifted Cochlear implant to Abhinandh, a school boy, with hearing issues, as requested by politician Ramesh Chennithala in a promotional event.
