= Ashkar Saudan =

Indian Malayalam film actor

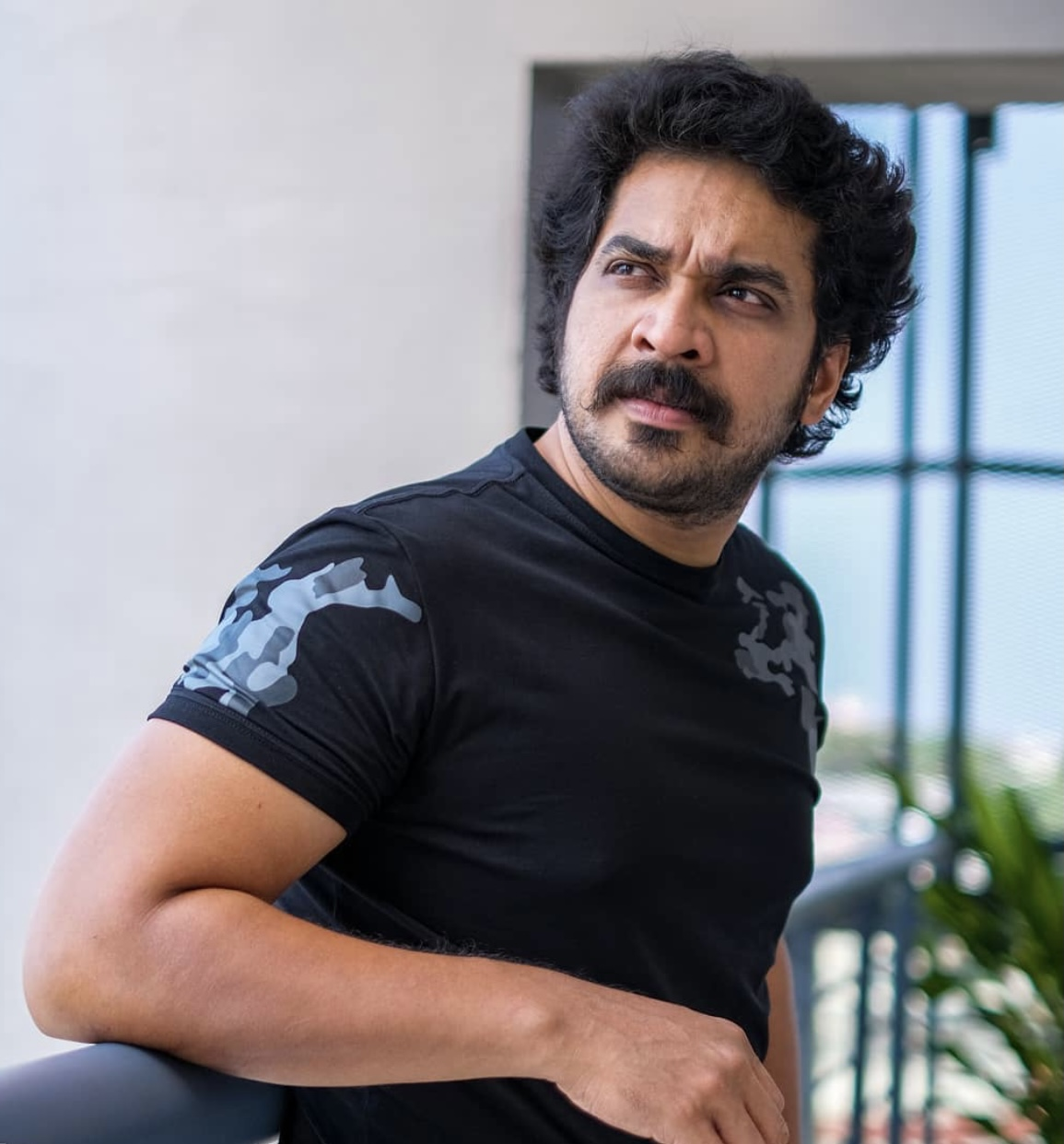
- Born: Thalayolaparambu, Kottayam, Kerala, India
- Education: Maharaja's College, Ernakulam
- Occupation: Actor
- Years active: 2005–present
- Relatives: Mammootty (uncle); Dulquer Salmaan (cousin); Maqbool Salmaan (cousin)

Ashkar Saudan is an Indian actor who predominantly work in the Malayalam cinema. He made his acting debut through the movie Thaskaraveeran directed by Pramod Pappan starring Mammootty in 2005.

== Career ==
He started his career as an actor in the movie Ivar Vivahitharayal directed by Saji Surendran and later played the role in Mithram directed by Jespal Shanmugham in 2014. He also appeared in several movies like Kolamas, Moonam Pralayam, Ennodu Para I Love You Ennu, Mere Pyare Deshvasiyom and Vallikkettu.

== Filmography ==
Year	Title	Role	Notes
2005	Thaskaraveeran	Jithu Lal	Debut film
2009	Ivar Vivahitharayal	Jehangir	
2014	Mithram		
2016	Kolamas	Christy	
2019	Moonam Pralayam		
2019	Ennodu Para I Love You Ennu		
2019	Mere Pyare Deshvasiyom		
2019	Vallikettu	Sajith	
2022	Anandakalyanam		
2024	DNA		
2025	Besty	Remis	
2025	The Case Diary	CI Christian Sam	
