= Software Ganda =

2014 film by Venkatesh

- Promotional poster
- Directed by: Venkatesh
- Produced by: Venkatesh; Ramappa; Sampath Kumar
- Starring: Jaggesh; Nikita Thukral; Srinath; Sakshi Agarwal
- Cinematography: Nagesh Acharya
- Music by: Veer Samarth
- Production company: Sri Marikamba Films
- Release date: 5 December 2014
- Running time: 130 minutes
- Country: India
- Language: Kannada

Software Ganda (transl. Software husband) is a 2014 Indian Kannada-language romantic comedy drama film directed and co-produced by Venkatesh. The film features Jaggesh and Nikita Thukral in the lead roles besides Srinath and Sakshi Agarwal in other pivotal roles. The film's score and soundtrack is composed by Veer Samarth while the cinematography is by Nagesh Acharya.

The film was released on 5 December 2014 worldwide. The film is a remake of the 2012 Malayalam film My Boss, which itself was inspired from the 2009 American film The Proposal.

== Premise ==
Manu, a software engineer, faces difficulty working under Priya, his short-tempered NRI boss. Priya is forced to leave India due to visa issues and she decides to marry Manu for her selfish needs.

== Cast ==
- Jaggesh as Manu
- Nikita Thukral as Priya S Rao
- Srinath as Manu's father
- Sakshi Agarwal as Nancy
- Kuri Prathap as Venu, Manu's coworker
- Ruthu as Priya's friend
- Jayalakshmi as Manu's grandmother
- Shille Manjunath as Manu's nephew
- Achyuth Kumar as Vishwanath, Chairman at Citra Infotech
- Srinivas Prabhu as Srinivasan, FRRO

== Production ==
Ravichandran, Puneeth Rajkumar and Sudeep graced the film's launch. The final schedule of the film shoot was shot at Hebbal, Bengaluru on 27 March 2014 and the shoot continued in Thirthahalli for five to six days.

== Soundtrack ==
The film score and soundtrack has been composed by Veer Samarth and the audio has been brought out by Anand Audio label. The lyrics are written by Dr. Nagendra Prasad and Hrudaya Shiva. An Atlanta-based singer, Rekha Pallath, made her debut in playback singing with this film. The audio launch took place in Bengaluru in August 2014.

No.	Title	Lyrics	Singer(s)	Length
1.	"Kuditha Beda"	Hrudaya Shiva	Vijay Prakash	04:34
2.	"Sorry Very Sorry"	V. Nagendra Prasad	Chetan Gandharva, Rekha Pallath	04:28
3.	"Saniha Saniha"	Hrudaya Shiva	Rajesh Krishnan, Lakshmi Nataraj	04:10
4.	"Pyategintha"	Hrudaya Shiva	Rajesh Krishnan, Shamitha Malnad	03:44
Total length:				16:56

== Release ==
The film was released on 5 December 2014 alongside Ka and Baanaadi.

=== Critical reception ===
GS Kumar of The Times of India rated the film three out of five stars and wrote, "An all-out entertainer, Software Ganda offers a generous dose of laughter. Jaggesh shines all through the movie with his superlative performance". A critic from Sify gave the film the same rating and wrote, "Over all, the movie is entertaining and worth watching once for the humorous dialogues".

=== Home media ===
The satellite rights for the film was sold for ₹1.6 crore to a leading television channel.

== Controversy ==
Before the release of the film, Jaggesh disassociated himself from the film as he felt that the film fell in the wrong hands and that the producers were not promoting the film.
