= Cinderella (2021 Indian film) =

2021 film by Vinoo Venkatesh

- Theatrical release poster
- Directed by: Vinoo Venketesh
- Written by: Vinoo Venketesh
- Produced by: S. Subbiah
- Starring: Raai Laxmi; Abhinaya; Sakshi Agarwal
- Cinematography: Rammy
- Edited by: Lawrence Kishore
- Music by: Ashwamithra
- Production company: SSi Productions
- Release date: 24 September 2021
- Running time: 113 minutes
- Country: India
- Language: Tamil

Cinderella is a 2021 Indian Tamil-language horror film written and directed by Vinoo Venketesh in directorial debut under the banner SSi Productions. The film stars Raai Laxmi in the title role and Sakshi Agarwal. The music was composed by Aswamithra with cinematography by Rammy and editing by Lawrence Kishore. Principal photography of the film commenced in October 2018. The film was released on 24 September, 2021.

== Plot ==
Akira (Raai Laxmi), a sound designer, is arrested as a suspect, but she claims she is innocent. She had come to a hill station to record the sounds of a few rare birds for a Hollywood project. She finds a Cinderella costume in an antique shop and brings it home and has paranormal experiences. Meanwhile, Ramya (Sakshi Agarwal), a rich girl is killed and her mother becomes the next target of a ghost. At the police station, a man is arrested for assaulting Ramya's mother Sandra. When leaving the station, Akira bumps into Sandra, who is shocked to see her. She contacts her manager, requesting for an appointment with Saint Gonzalves. The movie then jumps to a flashback.

Thulasi, Akira's lookalike, works as a maid for Sandra and Ramya, who berates her. She once sees a Cinderella costume and saves money to buy it. Meanwhile, Ramya falls in love with her dance choreographer Robin. Robin on a visit to Ramya's House, sees Thulasi dancing and admires her. Later during Ramya's birthday party, Thulasi wears the Cinderella costume, and Robin falls for her. He later proposes to her, angering Ramya. Later that day, Ramya and Sandra kill Thulasi. Thulasi's spirit goes into the gown, and a possessed Akira kills Ramya. Sandra, with the help of the Saint, tries to ward off the ghost. Thulasi pairs up with another woman's ghost (a lady killed by her husband and Sandra) and kills Sandra.

== Cast ==
- Raai Laxmi as Thulasi / Akira
- Abhinaya as Inspector Rakshana, John's wife
- Sakshi Agarwal as Ramya
- Ujjayinee Roy as Ramya's mother
- Robo Shankar as Guru tailor
- Kalloori Vinoth as Bob, Akira's friend
- My Dear Bootham Abhilash as Kayamboo
- Mohan Raman as Judge
- Gajaraj as Rakshana's father
- Anbu Thasan as Akira's friend
- Boys Rajan as Psychiatrist
- Supergood Subramani as Security Guard
- Mathew Varghese as Akira's father
- Billy Murali as Police
- Mippu
- Master Sucil as Thulasi's friend

== Production ==
The project was announced by debutant Vinoo Venketesh who previously worked as an associate director of S. J. Surya. The filming progressed from October 2018 according to notable sources. After narrating the script to Nayanthara, Trisha, Amy Jackson, Hansika Motwani, Aishwarya Rajesh, Manisha Yadav, Anjali, and Regina Cassandra, Raai Laxmi, who was part of horror films like Aranmanai and Kanchana, was cast in the female lead. As per Raai, she has three different characterisations in the film. Sakshi Agarwal was announced as a second female lead.

== Soundtrack ==
The soundtrack was composed by Aswamithra. All lyrics written by Kabilan Vairamuthu.

Cinderella

Soundtrack album by Aswamithra
- Released: 2021
- Genre: Feature film soundtrack
- Length: 14:28
- Label: Junglee Music
- Producer: Aswamithra

Aswamithra chronology
Kanchana 2 (2015)	Cinderella (2021)

Track listing
No.	Title	Singer(s)	Length
1.	"Aalavanjiye (Female Vocals)"	Aishwarya Ravichandran, Balaji Sri	4:28
2.	"Aalavanjiye (Male Vocals)"	G. V. Prakash Kumar, Balaji Sri	4:29
3.	"Boogie Woogie"	Kiran Shravan, Vinoo Venkatesh	3:45
4.	"Cinderella Theme"		1:46

== Release ==
The film was released on 24 September 2021.

== Critical reception ==
Cinderella received mixed reviews from Ananda Vikatan and The Times of India.
