= Ayushman Bhava (1998 film) =

- VCD cover
- Directed by: Suresh Vinu
- Screenplay by: J. Pallassery
- Story by: P. Vasu
- Produced by: Ambili Pravachambalam
- Starring: Jayaram; Divya Unni; Mohini; Innocent
- Cinematography: P. S. Nivas
- Music by: Johnson; A. T. Ummer
- Release date: 1998
- Country: India
- Language: Malayalam

Ayushman Bhava is a 1998 Indian Malayalam-language film directed by Suresh Vinu and produced by Ambili Pravachambalam. The film stars Jayaram, Divyaa Unni, Mohini and Innocent. The film has musical score by Johnson and songs by A. T. Ummer.

== Plot ==
Govinda Menon is in deep financial crisis and he is facing attachment of his family property and he decides to end his life as he ran out of options to save his pride. However he ends up saving the life of Suryan who attempted suicide in front of his eyes. Govinda Menon takes Suryan to his house masquerading him as the son of his friend and a famous writer who wants solitude to write the story for a film.

Suryan comes from an affluent family and was thrown out of his family due to a misunderstanding and he became lonely and desperate and didn't see any reason to live. Govinda Menon enters into an agreement with Suryan to end his life after an year and he takes an LIC policy in Suryan's name with him as Nominee so that he gets the money after Suryan's death. However, Suryan falls in love with Sumangala, Menon's daughter and wants to live again.

Govinda Menon is upset with Suryan and wants to break their love. However, things take a turn when Suryan is traced by his family members. Watch the full movie to know how the story unfolds in the end.

== Cast ==
- Jayaram as Suryan
- Divya Unni as Sumangala
- Mohini as Priya
- Innocent as Govinda Menon
- Srividya as Suriyan's mother
- Jagathy Sreekumar as Madhava Menon, brother in law of Govinda Menon and LIC agent.
- Manka Mahesh as Devaki, wife of Govinda Menon
- Manju Pillai as dance teacher Gangavathy.
- Sai Kumar as Prakash, lover of Priya
- Augustine as Moosakutty
- K.T.S. Padannayil as father of Govinda Menon
- Pala Narayanan Nair as father of Priya (Mohini)
- Chali Pala as Moosakutti's advocate
- Sajitha Betti as Priya (Child)

== Soundtrack ==
The music was composed by Johnson and A. T. Ummer.

No.	Song	Singers	Lyrics	Length (m:ss)
1	"Anthippoomaanam"	K. J. Yesudas, Sujatha Mohan	Kaithapram Vishwanathan Nambudiri	04:55
2	"Radha Madhavamay"	K. S. Chithra	Gireesh Puthenchery	5:05
3	"Sreepalkadalil"	M. G. Sreekumar, K. S. Chithra	Gireesh Puthenchery	3:22
4	"Kakkapeenne"		Gireesh Puthenchery	
