= Ka Ka Ka Po =

2016 film by P. S. Vijay

- Poster
- Directed by: P. S. Vijay
- Produced by: Selvishankar Lingam
- Starring: Sakshi Agarwal; Kesavan; Subbu Panchu
- Cinematography: Iqbal Vikram
- Edited by: Pirabakar
- Music by: Amara C. V. Dhina; P. C. Sivam
- Production company: DNS Movie Production
- Release date: 8 June 2016
- Country: India
- Language: Tamil

Ka Ka Ka Po (short for Kavitavum Kannadasanum Kadhalikka Porangu; transl. Kavita and Kannadasan are about to fall in love) is a 2016 Indian Tamil-language comedy film written and directed by P. S. Vijay. The film stars Sakshi Agarwal an Kesavan in the lead roles, with Subbu Panchu in a supporting role.

== Cast ==
- Sakshi Agarwal as Kavita Punyakodi
- Kesavan as Kannadasan
- Subbu Panchu as Rishabarajan
- Aadhavan
- Karunas
- Robo Shankar as Raghavan
- Singampuli
- Powerstar Srinivasan
- M. S. Bhaskar
- Mayilsamy
- Madhan Bob
- Anu Mohan
- Sangili Murugan
- V. S. Raghavan
- Jaguar Thangam
- Vadivukkarasi
- Nirosha
- Rajashree
- Jangiri Madhumitha
- Vijay Ganesh
- Sandy in a special appearance

== Production ==
The film was titled Ka Ka Ka Po, with a tagline of Kavithavum Kannadhasanum Kadhalika Poraanga. The makers of the film were briefly engaged in a tussle over the naming rights of the film with the team of Kadhalum Kadandhu Pogum (2016). Both films were referred to by the media as Ka Ka Ka Po, a phrase taken from a popular dialogue from Imsai Arasan 23rd Pulikecei (2006). Though both films had different expansions of the phrase, director Vijay stated that he was apprehensive that his film might suffer due to the confusion. Both films later released without any problem.

For the film, Sakshi Agarwal underwent special training for stunt sequences, and also featured in a song, where she appeared in nine different get-ups. The song shoot for each look happened at different locations including Malaysia, Puducherry, and Hyderabad. The makers cast thirty three comedians in the film to play small roles.

The film's lead actor Keshavarajan Latchumanasami, who was debuting with the stage name of Kesavan, died in an accident in November 2015, long before the release of the film.

== Soundtrack ==
Track listing
No.	Title	Lyrics	Music	Singer(s)	Length
1.	"Tan Tan Tan"	P. S. Vijay	Dhina	Reeta, Mukesh
2.	"Amsanandha"	Gana Bala	P. C. Sivam	Gana Bala
3.	"Satti Thookuravan Yaaru"	Ku. Karthik	Hamara C. V.	Dhivakar
4.	"Kakakapo Promo Song"	P. S. Vijay	Amara C. V.	Sai Prashanth, Sruthika, Neelima
5.	"Devadaiya En Thevai Niye"	P. S. Vijay	Amara C. V.
6.	"Kakakapo Theme Song"	P. S. Vijay	Amara C. V.	Sruthika

== Reception ==
A reviewer from The Times of India wrote, "with a story which has almost no scope to keep the viewers entertained, the flimsy narration and sluggish making rubs salt into our wounds." The critic added "what is even more disappointing is the spectacle of a myriad talented comedians making ineffective appearances at regular intervals — all of them being wasted in inept roles". Samayam rated the film 2.5 out of 5 stars, but appreciated the humour.
