= Moonam Pralayam =

2019 Indian Malayalam-language drama film

Moonnam Pralayam
- Theatrical release poster
- Directed by: Ratheesh Raju M.R
- Written by: S.K. Vilwan
- Produced by: Vivek Adimali; Devasia Kuriakose; Rasheed Mechery; Manu Sadhanandhan
- Starring: Ashkar Saudan; Sai Kumar; Bindu Panikkar; Kulappulli Leela; V. Suresh Thampanoor
- Cinematography: Razak Kunnath
- Edited by: Greyson ACA
- Music by: Raghupathy
- Production company: Niagara Movies
- Distributed by: Suri Cinemas
- Release date: 2 August 2019
- Running time: 122 minutes
- Country: India
- Language: Malayalam

Moonnam Pralayam is a 2019 Indian Malayalam-language drama film directed by Ratheesh Raju M.R and written by S.K. Vilwan based on Kerala floods and its after effects. The film was produced by Devasia Kuriakose under the banner of Niagara Movies. It stars Ashkkar Soudaan, Sai Kumar, Bindu Panikkar, Kulappulli Leela, V. Suresh Thampanoor and Anil Murali.

The story of the film follows the happenings at a relief camp opened in a church at Kainakary in Kuttanad. It was filmed in 18 days. The film was theatrically released on 2 August 2019. The film was theatrically released on 2 August 2019.

== Cast ==
- Ashkkar Soudaan
- Sai Kumar
- Bindu Panikkar
- Kulappulli Leela
- V. Suresh Thampanoor
- Anil Murali
- Sanuja Somanath
- Sandra Nair
- Aneesh Anand
- Basil Mathew

== Soundtrack ==
Moonam Pralayam

Soundtrack album by Manithamara, Raghupathy
- Released: 13 July 2019
- Recorded: 2019
- Studio: Chethana Studio
- Genre: Feature film soundtrack
- Language: Malayalam
- Label: Millennium Audio

The soundtrack is composed by Raghupathy and Manithamara and lyrics are by Manithamara. Sachithandan Puzhankara

Track list
No.	Title	Lyrics	Music	Singer(s)	Length
1.	"Kadalu Kaninje Kattadiche"	Manithamara	Manithamara	Manithamara	2:50
2.	"Pathiye Veyilin"	Sachithandan Puzhankara	Raghupathy	Sachin Wariyar	4:26
