= Fukri =

- Theatrical release poster
- Directed by: Siddique
- Written by: Siddique
- Produced by: Siddique; Vaishak Rajan; Jenso Jose
- Starring: Jayasurya; Lal; Siddique; Prayaga Martin; Joju George
- Cinematography: Vijay Ulaganath
- Edited by: K. R. Gourishankar
- Music by: Gopi Sunder
- Production companies: S. Talkies; Vaishaka Cynyma
- Distributed by: S. Talkies Release
- Release date: 3 February 2017
- Running time: 156 minutes
- Country: India
- Language: Malayalam

Fukri is a 2017 Indian Malayalam-language comedy-drama film written and directed by Siddique and starring Jayasurya, Lal, Siddique, Prayaga Martin and Joju George. It was produced by Siddique, Vaishak Rajan, and Jenso Jose under the banners of S Talkies and Vaishaka Cynyma.

The movie's name, Fukri, is an Urdu word. It "has been used as the family name" in the movie.

== Plot ==
An engineering dropout, Lucky is in pursuit of quick moneymaking plans but finds himself trapped in one trouble after the other. He is accompanied by his friends; Franklin, Kunjappu and Venkatesh Iyer. His life takes a new turn when he meets a college girl Nafsi and her cousin Sana.

== Cast ==
- Jayasurya as Lucky / Luqmaan Ali Fukri
- Siddique as Sulaiman Fukri
- Lal as Ramzan Ali Fukri
- Anu Sithara as Alia Ali Fukri
- Prayaga Martin as Nafsi
- Joju George as Usman
- Krishna Praba as Clara
- Bhagath Manuel as Franklin
- Niyas Backer as Vasantha Kumar
- Nirmal Palazhi as Kunjappu
- Moideen Koya as Chief Judge
- John Kaippali as Ubaid
- Janardhanan as Venkatesh Iyer
- K. P. A. C. Lalitha as Bhagyalakshmi's Mother
- Sreelatha Namboothiri as Sulaiman's Elder Sister
- Thesni Khan as Nabeesa
- Reena as Hajira
- Seema G. Nair as Bhagyalakshmi's Relative
- Jayakrishnan as Raghunath
- Naseer Sankranthi as the man at the temple
- Salini.R.T as Sana
- Sajan Palluruthy as Driver
- Vinayak p as the Hindu Priest

== Production ==
The filming started in late September. It was slated for 2016 Christmas release but due to association issues, release was delayed. Jayasurya signed into play the lead role in Siddique's for the first time, while Madonna Sebastian was considered for one of the female leads. Anu Sithara signed into play second female lead. Prayaga Martin replaced the former.

== Release ==
The film grossed ₹1.53 crore in its opening day at Kerala box office.
