= Koodathayi cyanide killings =

Six murders in Kerala, India, over 14 years

- Location: Koodathayi, Kozhikode, Kerala, India
- Date: 2002–2016
- Attack type: Cyanide poisoning
- Deaths: 6
- Victims: Annamma Thomas, 57; Tom Thomas, 66; Roy Thomas, 40; Mathew Manjayadil, 68; Alphine Shaju, 2; Sily Shaju, 41
- Inquiries: K. G. Simon, Rural SP, Kerala Police
- Accused: Jolly Joseph (prime suspect); M. S. Mathew; Praji Kumar
- Charges: Murder

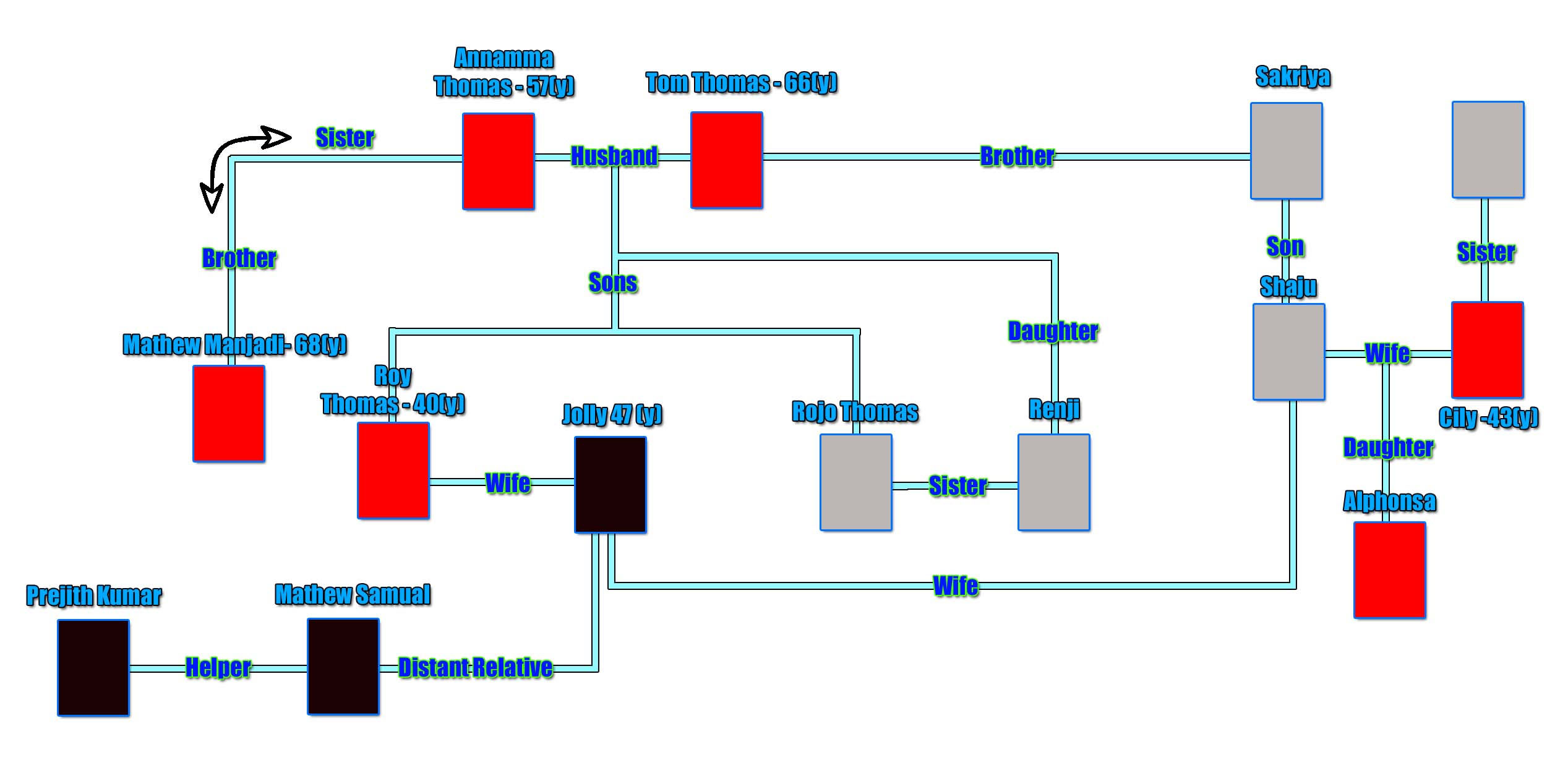
The Thomas family tree and relations Victims allegedly murdered by the prime accused, Jolly Joseph, through cyanide poisoning between 2002 and 2016 Prime accused and the suspected accomplices Living family members

The Koodathayi cyanide killings were a series of unnatural deaths that were later regarded as murders, that occurred in Koodathayi in Kerala, India. The crimes were investigated in late 2019, involving the mystery of 6 deaths over a span of 14 years. The criminal cases drew considerable media and public interest to Kerala, and eventually led to the arrest of Jollyamma Joseph.

== Timeline of the crimes ==
In 2002, Annamma Thomas (aged 57), the mother-in-law of the accused, drank a glass of water after returning home from a walk. Immediately afterwards, she began to feel uneasy and dizzy, eventually collapsing on the floor. She was taken to the hospital, where she later died, and the doctors declared that she had suffered a heart attack.

In 2008, Tom Thomas (aged 66), Annamma's husband and Jolly's father-in-law, died after swooning and collapsing. Jolly Joseph was allegedly present at the spot on both occasions.

In 2011, Roy Thomas (aged 40), Jolly's then husband, died after consuming his dinner of rice and Bengal gram curry. He was found dead in a bathroom that was locked from the inside. The cause of death was then ruled as suicide due to financial issues, as the post-mortem report showed traces of poison. Roy's maternal uncle, Mathew Manjayadil, called for a post-mortem report and an inquiry into Roy's cause of death.

In 2014, Mathew (aged 68) swooned and died after Jolly allegedly gave him poison-laden whisky. The deceased Roy has a cousin named Shaju Zachariah.

The same year (2014), Shaju's two-year-old daughter, Alphine Shaju, died after "choking on food".

In 2016, Jolly allegedly gave Sily Shaju (aged 41), Alphine's mother, a mushroom capsule, which Jolly convinced her would help with energy and depression, and Sily died on the spot soon after.

In 2018, Rojo Thomas (brother of Roy Thomas) came down to Koodathayi and filed a series of RTI applications. From the government hospital, he received a copy of the autopsy report of his brother's body. "When he read the report, he found out that what Jolly told us was wrong. Jolly told us he had food at 3.30 pm and hadn't had food after that. But it was clear in the post-mortem report that he had rice and Bengal gram curry at 8.30 pm," said family friend Mohammad Bawa. "Acute cyanide poisoning can result in death in a matter of seconds. Cyanide does not accumulate in the body and so it is rare to encounter it in slow death cases," explained Dr V. V. Pillay, head of Forensic Medicine & Toxicology, Amrita Institute of Medical Sciences in Kochi.

== Suspects ==
Jolly Joseph (born May 26, 1977), who was 47 at the time of her arrest in 2019, was the prime suspect in the murder of six members of the family she married into. It was Renji Thomas, Roy Thomas's sister, who complained to the police about the six unnatural deaths whose investigation led to Jolly Joseph. Following her arrest in October 2019, Jolly confessed to using cyanide to kill the six aforementioned people. She allegedly obtained the cyanide with the help of M. S. Mathew and Praji Kumar, who have also been arrested.

=== Jolly Joseph ===
Jolly was originally from Kattappana, Idukki district, and a first-year college dropout. She married her first husband, Roy Thomas, in 1997. Jolly and Roy had two sons, now aged 19 and 24. According to her neighbour, Jolly lied to fellow villagers about being an M.Com. (Master's degree in Commerce) graduate and working at NIT Calicut. Her whereabouts during her daily outings to her fake job remained uncertain. In 2011, her husband Roy Thomas died under mysterious circumstances. Following the death of Shaju Zachariah's wife in 2016, Jolly married Shaju. Jolly had been described as "jovial, friendly, jolly and pious" by people who knew her.

=== M. S. Mathew ===
According to the police, Mathew, a jewellery shop employee who was also a distant relative and lover of Jolly, was the one who provided Jolly with the cyanide. He reportedly told the police that he procured the cyanide from Praji Kumar after giving him two bottles of alcohol and ₹5,000. Mathew claims that Jolly asked him for cyanide to kill a rat that comes near her house.

=== Praji Kumar ===
Praji Kumar was a goldsmith who allegedly gave M. S. Mathew the cyanide. He stated that he assumed the poison was being bought to kill rats.

== In popular culture ==
Antony Perumbavoor announced his upcoming movie would be based on the Koodathayi incident, with the leading role played by Mohanlal, synchronized actress Dini Daniel launched a poster through social media of her new movie based the same topic in which she plays as Jolly Joseph.

Malayalam entertainment-oriented TV channels are airing the same topic in their serials but using a different method of storytelling, fencing against legal issues.

In November 2019, Kairali TV released a serial based on the Koodathayi case. Serial actress Divya Sreedhar had played the role of Dolly, a woman who is a psychopath. Krithyam was the first Malayalam television serial that portrayed the Koodathayi incident.

In December 2019, Sony TV's crime series Crime Patrol presented 3 episodes case based on Koodathayi incident.

In 2020, a Malayalam TV series named Koodathayi was aired on Flowers TV based on the series killing incident. Actress Muktha played the role of a killer in the Malayalam serial. Actors like Mallika Sukumaran, Kollam Thulasi, Dayyana Hamid, etc., played other roles in that serial.

On 7 September 2020, Spotify launched a ten-episode original podcast, Death, Lies & Cyanide narrated by the journalist Sashi Kumar, based on the murders.

On 22 December 2023, Netflix released a documentary film titled Curry & Cyanide: The Jolly Joseph Case based on the case. It is directed by Christo Tomy, and written by Shalini Ushadevi.

Anali, an upcoming web series on Disney+ Hotstar directed by Midhun Manuel Thomas is reportedly based on the case. It stars Nikhila Vimal and Leona Lishoy in lead roles.
