= Nakshathragal Parayathirunnathu =

Nakshathrangal Parayathirunnathu
- Directed by: C S Sudhesh
- Written by: Mohammed Ashraf
- Produced by: Abdulla
- Starring: Mukesh; Divya Unni; Lal
- Cinematography: Venugopal Madathil
- Edited by: Ranjan Abraham
- Music by: Mohan Sithara
- Distributed by: Greeshma Films
- Release date: 10 February 2001
- Country: India
- Language: Malayalam

Nakshathrangal Parayathirunnathu (transl. What the Stars didn't Say) is a 2001 Indian Malayalam-language film directed by C S Sudesh. Starring Mukesh, Divya Unni, Lal, Innocent, Harisree Ashokan, Rajan P Dev, Jayabharathi and Narendra Prasad in the lead roles, the film was released in the year 2001 in India. This film was one of Divya Unni's last films before her sabbatical.

== Plot ==
Two friends, Nandakumar and Shashaankan, are in a desperate need of money. They decide to get their hands on some cash through unfair means.

== Cast ==
- Divya Unni as Sivaranjini
- Mukesh as Nandakumar
- Lal as Gowrishankar
- Narendra Prasad as Vasudeva Panicker
- Rajan P Dev as Rajashekharan
- Innocent as Govinda Kamath
- Harisree Ashokan as Shashaankan
- Jayabharathi as Sivaranjini's Mother
- Shantha Kumari as Deviamma
- Krishna Prasad

== Music ==
All songs were penned by Kaithapram Damodaran Namboothiri and was composed by Mohan Sithara.

No.	Title	Singer(s)	Length
1.	"Nishagandhi Poothu" (Male)	K.J. Jesudas	06:04
2.	"Kukkoo Kukkoo Kuyile" (Female)	K.S. Chithra	04:30
3.	"Anthimazha Mayangi"	K.J. Jesudas	05:36
4.	"Arikathoru"	M.G. Sreekumar	04:09
5.	"Thillai Thillai"	M.G. Sreekumar & Smitha	04:10
6.	"Kukkoo Kukkoo Kuyile" (Male)	M.G. Sreekumar	04:18
7.	"Anthimazha Mayangi" (Female)	Radhika Thilak	05:39
8.	"Nishagandhi Poothu" (Female)	K.S. Chithra	06:05
Total length:			40:30

== Release ==
The film was released during Onam. A critic from indiainfo wrote that "Anyhow the film is very likely to appeal to family audiences and fans of Mukesh and Divya Unni too".
