= Doctor Love (film) =

- Film poster
- Directed by: K. Biju
- Written by: K. Biju
- Produced by: Joy Thomas Sakthikulangara
- Starring: Kunchacko Boban; Bhavana; Ananya; Bhagath Manuel
- Narrated by: Asif Ali
- Cinematography: Shaji Kumar
- Edited by: V. Sajan
- Music by: Vinu Thomas; Gopi Sundar
- Production company: Jithin Arts
- Distributed by: Jithin Arts Release
- Release date: 9 September 2011
- Running time: 160 minutes
- Country: India
- Language: Malayalam

Doctor Love (also spelled Dr. Love) is a 2011 Indian Malayalam-language romantic comedy film written and directed by K. Biju. The film stars Kunchacko Boban, Ananya, Bhavana, Manikuttan, Rejith Menon, and Salim Kumar. The songs were composed by Vinu Thomas. Doctor Love was released on 9 September 2011. The film was shot on the campus of St. Berchmans College, Changanassery.

== Plot ==
Dr. Love is the story of Vinayachandran, an unsuccessful romantic novel writer who helps people with love issues. Because of his ability to help people solve love issues, he gets a job as a waiter in a college canteen, which also aids the hearty affair of a Professor. But after entering the campus, he helps a student, Sudhi, to get his lover, Manju, and thus, becomes a hero. He is given the title Doctor Love - Romance Consultant by the students on the campus.

One of the challenges before him is to make the brash campus devil Ebin fall in love with the quiet boy Roy. Dr. Love starts working on his plan but the story takes some dramatic turns.

== Cast ==
- Kunchacko Boban as Vinayachandran
  - Ramzan Muhammed as Young Vinayachandran
- Bhavana as Ebin
  - Esther Anil as Young Ebin
- Ananya as Gauri
- Bhagath Manuel as Sudhi
- Hemanth Menon as Roy Mathew
- Rajith Menon as Martin
- Manikuttan as Rafeeq
- Aju Varghese as Omanakuttan
- Vidhya Unni as Manju (voice dubbed by Angel Shijoy)
- Jayashree Sivadhas as Sreekutty
- Biyon as Kannan
- Miya George as Ebin's friend
- Nimisha Suresh as Ebin's friend
- Roslin as Yashoda
- Kalabhavan Niyas as Eldho
- Innocent as Sathyasheelan
- Nedumudi Venu as Gauri's father
- Shari as Ebin's mother
- Kalabhavan Shajohn as Appachan
- Bindu Panicker as Ajithakumari
- Lal as Himself (cameo appearance)
- Asif Ali as Narrator (cameo appearance)

== Soundtrack ==
Doctor Love

Soundtrack album by Vinu Thomas
- Released: 2011
- Genre: Film soundtrack
- Producer: Vinu Thomas

All lyrics are written by Vayalar Sarath Chandra Varma; all music is composed by Vinu Thomas.

No.	Title	Artist(s)	Length
1.	"Ormakal Verodum"	Karthik
2.	"Nannavoola"	Benny Dayal, Ranjith Unni, Vinu Thomas, Anju Joseph, Kids Chorus
3.	"Ninnedonikkula"	Riya Raju
4.	"Aakasham Doore"	Najim Arshad, Vivekanandan
5.	"Avanalle re-tune"	Anwar sadath
6.	"Avanalle"	Ranjith, Franco Simon, Balu Thankachan, Vipin Xavier, Vineeth Sreenivasan, C. J. Kuttappan, Namitha
7.	"Kai Onnadichen"	Vineeth Sreenivasan, Rimy Tomy, C. J. Kuttappan

== Reception ==
=== Critical reception ===
Rediff.com gave the film a rating of 2 out of 5 and said "Dr Love is yet another campus film". Sify also rated the movie at 2/5 and said "Dr. Love tries to present all those [sic] masala once again, but it looks amateurish to the core. Watch it at your own risk please". Indiaglitz said "All in all, 'Dr.Love' has some interesting moments and the ensemble star cast pitches in real performances too. On the whole, the movie could be an ideal popcorn flick targeted to strike a chord with the youth and those who relish candy floss and madcap entertainers. If you are not looking for wisdom and rationale in a light-hearted entertainer, we are sure you will savour this campus carnival" and gave 2.75 stars out of 5.
