= Aristo Suresh =

Indian actor (born 1969)

V. Suresh Thampanoor
- Born: 9 August 1969 (age 57); Thampanoor
- Other name: Aristo Suresh
- Occupations: Film Actor, Singer, lyricist and Poet
- Years active: 2015–present

V. Suresh Thampanoor, commonly known as Aristo Suresh is a singer, film actor, and lyricist, who works in Malayalam cinema. He was a finalist of the first season of Bigg Boss Malayalam.

== Personal life ==
Suresh hails from Aristo, a junction in Thampanoor, Thiruvananthapuram, Kerala. His family consists of father, mother and five sisters. For leisure he writes poems and folk songs and is popular for his knack for rhythm.

== Acting career ==
Suresh made his acting debut in the 2016 Malayalam film Action Hero Biju directed by Abrid Shine. He sang the popular song ‘Muthe Ponne Pinangallee’ in his debut film which became popular on social media platforms for its fun yet simple rhythm and beat, song being entirely composed and written by him. After the song and the movie both blew up, he gained popularity. In 2018, he joined the controversial TV show Bigg Boss Malayalam as one of the contestants., he acted the role of Pillai achan in Avarodoppam Aliyum Achayanum (Onam Special TV series on Asianet), has also done a role in Pathalam Dairies telecasted on Surya TV and also acted in TV series Ennum Sammatham on Mazhavil Manorama and Koodevide in Asianet. He has also acted in web series Kanimagalam Kovilakam and prakashante pennukanal.

== Filmography ==
Year	Title	Role	Notes
2016	Action Hero Biju	Drunkard	
2017	Sakhavu	Janaki's father	
2017	Udaharanam Sujatha	Auto Driver	
2018	Poomaram		
2018	Kuttanadan Marpappa		
2018	Parole		
2018	Cuban Colony		
2019	Ittymaani: Made in China	Kapyar Pranchi	
2019	Moonam Pralayam		
2019	Prathi Poovankozhi		
2023	Pookkaalam	Xavier	
2023	Kolaambi	Aampli Naanu	
2023	Laika		
2024	Vayasethrayaayi? Muppathiee..!!		
2025	Mr Bengali: The Real Hero		Debut film as lead role
