= Vidhya Unni =

Indian film actress

- Born: 1990 (age 35–36); Kochi, Ernakulam, Kerala, India
- Occupations: Film actress; Television presenter; Classical dancer
- Years active: 2011–2013
- Spouse: Sanjay Venkateswaran (m. 2019)
- Parents: Unnikrishnan (father); Uma (mother)
- Relatives: Divyaa Unni (sister); Meera Nandan (cousin); Remya Nambeesan (cousin)

Vidhya Unni (born 1990) is an Indian actress, television presenter and dancer who works prominently in Mollywood film industry. She made her acting debut in Malayalam with Dr. Love (2011)

== Career ==
Vidhya debuted in the Malayalam film Doctor Love. Vidhya was studying, when she received the offer to act in Doctor Love. Her second movie was 3rd generation (3G). She has participated many dance programmes and co-hosted many award shows on television. She anchored Super Chef, a cookery based programme on Asianet Plus.

== Filmography ==
Year	Film	Role	Language	Notes
2011	Dr. Love	Manju	Malayalam	Debut movie
2011	Nizhalaay	Heroine	Malayalam	Musical album
2013	3G Third Generation	Devika	Malayalam	Female lead
2015	Celebrate Happiness	Herself	Malayalam	Video song
TBA	Po210	TBA	Malayalam	

=== Television ===
Show	Role	Channel	Notes
14th Asianet Film Awards	Host	Asianet	
Super Chef	Host	Asianet	
Santhwanathine Ponnonam	Host	Asianet	
Star Jam	Guest	Kappa TV	
I Personally	Guest	Kappa TV	
Katha Ithuvare	Guest	Mazhavil Manorama	
Onnum Onnum Moonu	Guest	Mazhavil Manorama	
Sindooram		Surya TV	
Yes I am		One TV	

== Advertisements ==
- Fashion Zone Magazine
- Vanitha Magazine
- Karshakasree Magazine
- Rashtradeepika Cinema Magazine
- Grihalakshmi Magazine
- Nana Cinema Magazine
- Mahilaratnam
- Mangalam

== Personal life ==
Vidhya is the younger sister of actress Divyaa Unni. She did her engineering in electronics and communication from Amrita School of Engineering, Amritapuri. She was working as a software engineer with Cognizant, a US-based software company in Kochi. She has moved to Hong Kong as a part of her software job. She has quoted that if she misses acting and if she gets good roles she will definitely continue acting.

Vidhya married Chennai native Sanjay Venkateswaran in January 2019 and currently resides in Singapore.
