= Koodathayi =

Koodathai
- village
- Country: India
- State: Kerala
- District: Kozhikode

Population (2011)
  - Total: 13,563

Languages
  - Official: Malayalam, English
- Time zone: UTC+5:30 (IST)
- Vehicle registration: KL-

Koodathai is a village in Kozhikode district in the state of Kerala, India. The village is known for the Koodathayi cyanide killings.

== Demographics ==
As of 2011 India census, Koodathai had a population of 13,563, with 6,489 males and 7,074 females.

== Transportation ==
Koodathayi village connects to other parts of India through Koyilandy town and Thamarassery town. National Highway 66 (old NH-17) passes through Koyilandy and the northern stretch connects to Mangalore, Goa, and Mumbai. The southern stretch connects to Cochin and Trivandrum. National highway 766 passes through Thamarassery and the northern stretch connects to Kalpetta, Mysore and Bangalore. Southern stretch connects to Kozhikode city. The nearest railway station is at Kozhikode. The nearest airport is Calicut international airport

== Koodathayi serial murder case ==
Jolly Joseph was charged of murdering her husband, her in-laws and three other members of the extended family by mixing cyanide in their food over a period of 14 years from 2002 to 2016.
