= Orayiram Kinakkalal =

Orayiram Kinakalal
- Theatrical release poster
- Directed by: Pramod Mohan
- Written by: Pramod Mohan; Kiran Varma
- Story by: Pramod Mohan
- Produced by: Renji Panicker; Josmon Simon; Brijeesh Mohamed
- Starring: Biju Menon; Roshan Mathew; Sharu Varghese; Kalabhavan Shajohn; Nirmal Palazhi; Sakshi Agarwal
- Cinematography: Kunjunni S. Kumar
- Edited by: Mansoor Muthutty
- Music by: Ranjith Meleppat; Sachin Warrier; Aswin Ram; Bijibal (score)
- Production company: Renji Panicker Entertainment
- Distributed by: World Wide Films
- Release date: 6 April 2018
- Running time: 135 minutes
- Country: India
- Language: Malayalam

Orayiram Kinakkalal is a 2018 Indian Malayalam-language comedy thriller film directed by Pramod Mohan (in his directorial debut). The screenplay was written by Kiran Varma and Mohan, with dialogue co-written by Hrishikesh Mundani. The film stars Biju Menon, Roshan Mathew, Sharu Varghese, Kalabhavan Shajohn, Nirmal Palazhi, and Sakshi Agarwal. Orayiram Kinakkalal was released on 7 April 2018.

== Synopsis ==
Sreeram, an Ex NRI gets involved in a quick money making plan along with few other characters. Faced with unexpected turns of event, the story unfolds revealing different shades of each characters and how much they are willing to lose to fulfill their dreams. An unusual ride for a common man who is bound by family and law/crime.

== Cast ==
- Biju Menon as Sreeram
- Roshan Mathew as Jaison
- Sharu Varghese as Sherin
- Kalabhavan Shajohn as Circle Inspector Shajahan P. K.
- Nirmal Palazhi as Venu
- Sakshi Agarwal as Preethi
- Sai Kumar as Lalaji
- Sreeram Ramachandran as Gautham
- Parthavi as Paaru
- Suresh Krishna as Abraham Mathan
- Krishna Kumar as Stephen
- Ann Benjamin as Leena Mathan (Abraham Mathan's wife)
- Shaun Xavier as Deepu

== Production ==
Orayiram Kinakkalal is the debut feature film directorial of Pramod Mohan, who has previously worked in television shows. The film is a comedy thriller. Principal photography began on 10 December 2017 at Kochi, Kerala. The film was produced by Renji Panicker.

The production was done under the banner of Jayaraj Motion Pictures by Josemon Simon.

Josemon Simon is the overseas distributor for the film Orayiram Kinakkalal.

The movie is distributed by Renji Panicker Entertainment

== Music ==
The film features songs composed by Ranjith Meleppat, Sachin Warrier, and Aswin Ram; the score was composed by Bijibal. Lyrics for the songs were written by Santhosh Varma and Manu Manjith.

Track	Song	Singer(s)	Composer
1	"Oraayiram Kinakkal"	Ramshi Ahamed	Ranjith Meleppatt
2	"Ellaam Ok Aakkam"	Sooraj Santhosh	Aswin Ram
3	"Aaha"	M. G. Sreekumar	Sachin Warrier
4	"Nadodikkatte"	Ajay Sathyan, Poornasree	Ranjith Meleppatt

== Release ==
The film was released on 6 April 2018.
