= Divyaa Unni =

Indian actress and classical dancer

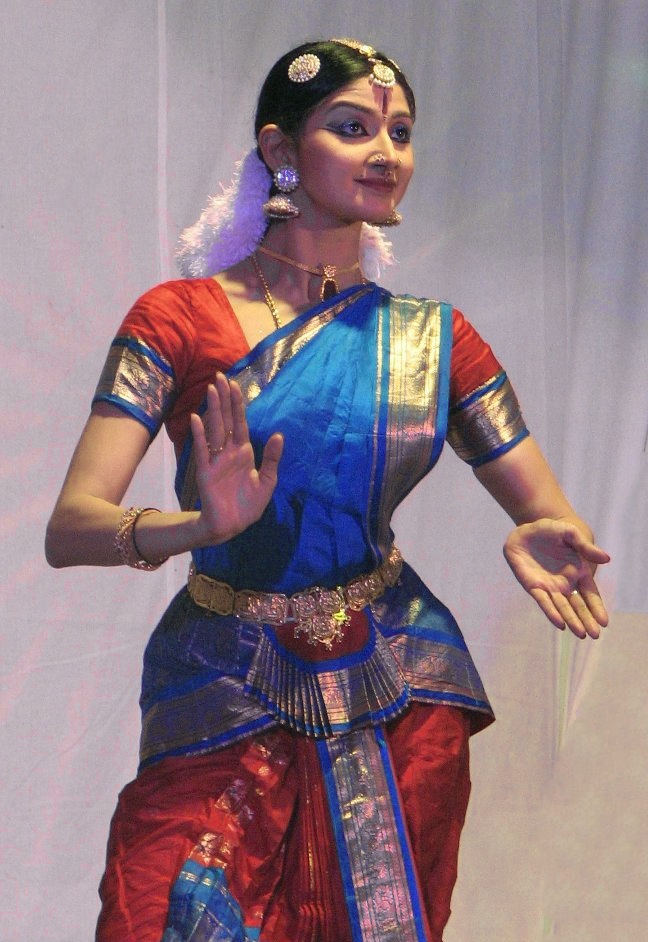
- Born: Date of birth: September 2, 1981 (age 45); Kochi, Kerala, India
- Education: St. Teresa's College, Kochi
- Occupations: Actress; classical dance performer; teacher
- Years active: 1987–2019
- Children: 3
- Relatives: Vidhya Unni (sister); Meera Nandan (cousin); Remya Nambeesan (cousin)

Divyaa Unni is an Indian former actress and classical dancer of Indian origin who teaches various forms of dance such as Bharathanatyam, Kuchipudi and Mohiniyattom. As an actress, she mainly appeared in Malayalam language films, in addition to few Tamil, Telugu and Kannada language films too.

== Early life and education ==
Divyaa Unni was born in Kochi, Kerala, to Uma Devi and Unnikrishnan. Her mother is a Sanskrit teacher and is the head of the Sanskrit department of Bhavans Vidya Mandir, Girinagar, and was awarded the National Award for Teachers (India) by the President of India. She has a sister, Vidhya Unni, who has worked as a lead in a couple of Malayalam movies.

Divyaa did her schooling at Bhavan's Vidya Mandir, Girinagar. She then completed her graduation in Communicative English and her postgraduation in Bharatanatyam from St. Teresa's College, Kochi.

== Dance career ==
Divyaa started her Bharatanatyam dance training at the age of three, thereafter she was trained in Kuchipudi, and Mohiniyattam. Subsequently, Divyaa Unni was crowned, in 1990 and 1991, "Kalathilakom" in Kerala School Kalolsavam statewide competitions. On India's premier Television Channel Doordarshan, she has presented a variety of Indian dance art-forms to such as Bharatanatyam, Kuchipudi, Mohiniyattam, and Indian folk dance. She continues to perform at various Indian dance festivals in India and international stages throughout North America, Europe and Persian Gulf countries.

== Filmography ==
Year	Title	Role	Language	Notes
2019	Aakasha Ganga 2	Maya / Daisy	Malayalam	Photo archive
2019	Thanka Bhasma Kuriyitta Thamburatti	Herself	Malayalam	Photo archive
2013	Musafir	Herself	Malayalam	Guest appearance
2010	Upadeshiyude Makan	Irin	Malayalam	
2008	Magic Lamp	Viji	Malayalam	Delayed release
2006	Illalu Priyuralu	Divya	Telugu	Delayed release
2001	Aandan Adimai	Gayathri	Tamil	
2001	Oru Apoorva Pranayakatha	Meenakshi	Malayalam	
2001	Nakshathragal Parayathirunnathu	Shivaranjini	Malayalam	
2001	Vedham	Anitha Sanjay	Tamil	
2001	Jameendar		Malayalam	
2001	Baanallu Neene Bhuviyallu Neene	Lalitha / Anita	Kannada	
2000	Palayathu Amman	Savithri	Tamil	
2000	Sabhash	Shanthi	Tamil	
2000	Kannan Varuvaan	Parvathi	Tamil	
2000	Mark Antony	Nimmi	Malayalam	
1999	Niram	Herself	Malayalam	Guest appearance
1999	Aakasha Ganga	Maya / Daisy	Malayalam	
1999	Aayiram Meni	Mallika	Malayalam	
1999	Usthad	Padmaja / Pappa	Malayalam	
1999	Friends	Uma	Malayalam	
1998	Sooryaputhran	Maya	Malayalam	
1998	The Truth	Nimmi	Malayalam	
1998	Ayushman Bhava	Sumangala	Malayalam	
1998	Oru Maravathoor Kanavu	Annie	Malayalam	
1998	Pranayavarnangal	Maya	Malayalam	
1997	Varnapakittu	Nancy	Malayalam	
1997	Churam	Maya	Malayalam	
1997	Katha Nayakan	Gopika	Malayalam	
1997	Karunyam	Indu	Malayalam	
1997	Nee Varuvolam	Revathi	Malayalam	
1997	Shibiram	Minikutty	Malayalam	
1996	Kalyana Sowgandhikam	Athira	Malayalam	Debut as Lead actress
1993	Sowbhagyam	Indhu's Sister	Malayalam	Child artist
1993	O' Faby	Child artist	Malayalam	Child artist
1991	Pookkalam Varavayi	School girl	Malayalam	Child artist
1987	Neeyethra Dhanya	Young Shyamala	Malayalam	Child artist

== Television ==
Serials

- Neeyum Njanum (Zee Keralam)
- Iniyonnu Vishramikkate (DD Malayalam)
- Shankupushpam (Asianet)
- Kunjikkoonan (DD Malayalam)
- Manassu (Surya TV)

Telefilm

- Pranayam (Surya TV)

TV shows as Host

- American Jalakam (Asianet)
- Asianet Film Awards (Asianet)
- America Today (Kairali TV)
- Pravaham
- Poomottukal (DD Malayalam)

TV shows as Judge

- Comedy Stars Season 3 (Asianet)
- Top singer season 2 (Flowers TV)
- Oru Chiri Iru chiri Bumper Chiri (Mazhavil Manorama)
- Star Magic (Flowers TV)
