= Sakshi Agarwal =

Indian actress and model

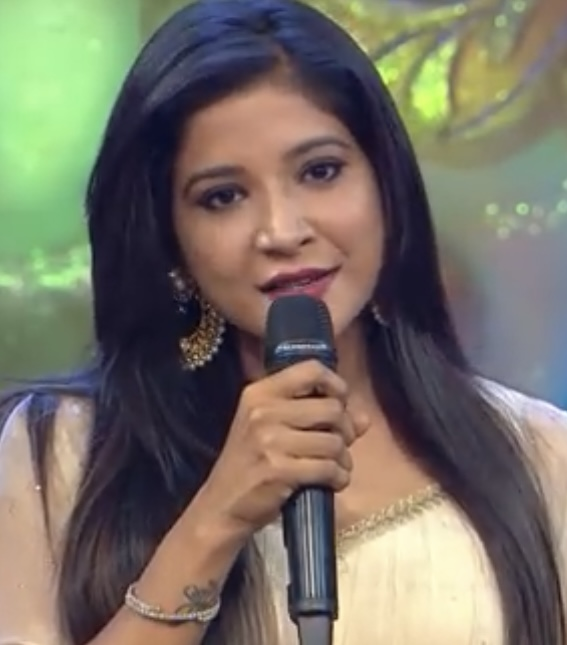
- Agarwal in 2018
- Born: 20 July 1990 (age 36); Nainital, Uttarakhand, India
- Occupations: Actress; model
- Years active: 2013 – present
- Television: Bigg Boss 3
- Spouse: Navneet Mishra (m. 2025)

Sakshi Agarwal (born 20 July 1990) is an Indian actress and model who has appeared in Tamil films. After beginning her working career as a marketing consultant, she pursued acting and garnered attention through part time modelling commitments. Since then she has taken up various lead and supporting roles in South Indian films. She was also a contestant in the Tamil reality TV show Bigg Boss 3.

== Career ==
A native of Nainital, Uttarakhand, Agarwal studied at Good Shepherd Convent, Chennai, completed a bachelor's degree in information technology at St. Joseph's College of Engineering, and then an MBA degree at Xavier Institute of Management and Entrepreneurship. She then pursued a career as a marketing consultant, first working with Tata Consultancy Services and then Infosys during 2010.

After taking part in a charity fashion show for a friend, Sakshi was approached by a modelling recruiter who introduced her to advertisement directors. Sakshi subsequently started taking up commercial assignments during her weekends, appearing as a model on print, television and fashion shows. She appeared in Malabar Gold's advert alongside Suriya, and later chose to quit her job at Infosys in January 2013 to take up a career as an actress. Agarwal then shot for a video album titled Jillinu Oru Kalavaram, learnt dance from Shiamak Davar and worked on acting skills with Ratan Thakore Theatre Group, to prepare herself for the film industry. She sought out acting opportunities in the Tamil and Kannada film industries, and signed her first film projects during early 2013.

She was first cast by director Tejaswi in a Kannada film titled Heddari, which she completed filming by August 2013. Her first release was a little known Tamil tele-film titled No Parking, while her first theatrical release was Atlee's Raja Rani (2013), where she portrayed a small role in one scene. Among her early films, Heddari and another proposed Kannada-Tamil bilingual titled Karaab Story by Prathap Gowda did not eventually release. Her first film release in a leading role was the Kannada comedy drama, Software Ganda (2014), where she portrayed an office worker. In 2015 and 2016, she appeared in a series of low-budget Tamil films as the main lead featuring in a variety of roles. For one particular song in Ka Ka Ka Po, she dressed up in nine different avatars, while in Adhyan, she played a fashion student. Other films she was attached to in the period were the unreleased Jeyikkira Kuthira, where she played a negative role, and Brahma.com, which she later opted out from.

In early 2017, Agarwal did a three-week intensive course at the Lee Strasberg Theatre and Film Institute, and has since been attached to an indie English film titled Cherubs. Sakshi then appeared in Pa. Ranjith's Kaala (2018) as a Hindi-speaking daughter-in-law of Rajinikanth's character. Agarwal auditioned for the role three times and noted her elation at being selected for the film. She later made her debut in the Malayalam film industry through the comedy drama, Orayiram Kinakkalal (2018), portraying the caring wife of Biju Menon's character.

In 2021 Agarwal went to play the female lead role in Vinoo Venkatesh's Cindrella, a Horror Thriller film, starring Raai Laxmi. The film opens high positive reviews from critics, Agarwal praises her performance in the film. Her second release was Aranmanai 3, alongside Sundar C, received mixed reviews.

In 2019, she took part in Star Vijay's Bigg Boss Tamil 3 and was evicted on Day 49, following her being the contestant with the least vote count. She is also a part of Bagheera starring Prabhu Deva along with Gopinath Ravi who is Rubaru Mr. India 2021 winner as her boy friend.

== Personal life ==
In January 2025, Sakshi married her boyfriend Navneet in a traditional Hindu wedding ceremony in Goa.

== Filmography ==
Key
†	Denotes films that have not yet been released

As an actress

- All films are in Tamil, unless otherwise noted.

Year	Film(s)	Role(s)	Notes	Ref.
2013	Raja Rani	Girl ordering cappuccino	Uncredited	
2014	Software Ganda	Nancy	Kannada film	
2015	Yoogan	Pooja		
2015	Thiruttu VCD	Sakshi		
2015	Adhyan	Anamika		
2016	Ka Ka Ka Po	Kavitha Punyakodi		
2018	Orayiram Kinakkalal	Preethi	Malayalam film	
2018	Kaala	Kaala's daughter-in-law		
2019	Viswasam	Niranjana's colleague		
2021	Kutty Story	Maya	Anthology film; Segment: Logam	
2021	Teddy	Dr. Priya	Guest Appearance	
2021	Cinderella	Ramya		
2021	Aranmanai 3	Hema		
2021	4 Sorry	Yamuna	Anthology film; second segment	
2023	Naan Kadavul Illai	Leena		
2023	Bagheera	Reshma		
2024	Adharma Kadhaigal	Priya		
2025	Besty	Shahina	Malayalam film	
2025	Ring Ring	Pooja		
2025	Fire	Priya		
2025	The Case Diary	Dr. Bhanu Priya	Malayalam film	
2025	Saaraa	Saaraa		
2026	Guest			
2026	Theeyor Koodam	Diya		
TBA	The Night †	TBA	Post-production	

=== Music video ===
Year	Song	Co star	Music director	Notes
2021	Yo Baby	Sridhar	Santhosh Narayanan	New year special song

As Dubbing artist

Year	Film	Actress
2019	Action	Akanksha Puri

== Television ==
Year	Show Name	Role	Channel	Notes
2018	Soppanna Sundari	Judge	Sun TV	
2019	Bigg Boss 3	Contestant	Star Vijay	Evicted Day 49
2022	Kannana Kanne	Sakshi	Sun TV	Special Appearance in special episode
2024–Present	Naanga Ready Neenga Ready Ah	Judge	Sun TV	Recurring Judge
