= The Case Diary =

Indian Malayalam-language investigation film

- Theatrical Release Poster
- Directed by: Dileep Narayanan
- Written by: A.K. Santhosh
- Story by: Shaheem Kochannur; Vivek Vadassery
- Produced by: K.V. Abdul Nazar
- Cinematography: P. Sukumar
- Edited by: Lijo Paul
- Music by: Vishnu Mohan Sithara; Madhu Balakrishnan; 4 Musics; BGM Prakash Alex
- Release date: 21 August 2025
- Country: India
- Language: Malayalam

The Case Diary is a 2025 Indian Malayalam-language investigation film directed by Dileep Narayanan and written by A. K. Santhosh. It is produced by K. V. Abdul Nasar under the banner of Benzy Productions. The film stars Ashkar Saudan in the lead role, along with Sakshi Agarwal, Rahul Madhav, Riyaz Khan and Vijayaraghavan.

== Plot ==
CI Christian Sam, the adopted son of retired Superintendent of Police Sam Koshy, takes on a mission to catch a robbery gang and comes to Srirangam for an investigation. He learns about the mysterious death of his twin brother, Aju Narayan, who was separated from the orphanage that they grew up at. He investigates the case and tries to find the real culprit behind Aju's murder.

== Cast ==
- Ashkar Saudan as Dual Role

° Kottayam SIT & Later Ottapalam Police Station CI Christy Sam ° Aju narayanan, A Bakery Shop Owner

- Rahul Madhav as Kannan, Aju's Friend
- Sakshi Agarwal as Dr. Bhanu Priya, Christy's Love Interest
- Vijayaraghavan as Rtd. SP Sam Koshy IPS, Christy's Father
- Riyaz Khan as Morris Petro Alaverez, An International Drug Mafia Criminal
- Neeraja as Shalini, Kannan's Love Interest
- Bala as Renghanathan alias M.S. Renghanathan, Ottapalam Drug Mafia and Morris's Partner
- Meghanathan as Retd. SI Solomon, Morris's Partner
- Kichu Tellus as
- Biju Kuttan as Manoharan, Aju's Friend
- Gokulan as Ottapalam Police Station SI Vladimir
- Ameer Niyas as Roshan Kurian, Morris's Partner

== Production ==
=== Casting ===
Ashkar Saudan was cast in the lead role, marking his second collaboration with Dileep Narayanan. The film also features Sakshi Agarwal, Rahul Madhav, Vijayaraghavan, Riyaz Khan and Bala in important roles.

=== Marketing ===
The first look poster of the film was released on 8 August 2025 and the trailer of the film was released on 16 August 2025 by actor Dileep.

== Release ==
The Case Diary was released theatrically on 21 August 2025.
