= Nirmal Palazhi =

Indian actor

- Born: Kozhikkode, Kerala India
- Occupation: Actor
- Years active: 2013 - Present
- Known for: Comedy Artist, Actor
- Notable work: Puthen Panam (Malayalam Film); Diwanji Moola Grand Prix
- Television: Comedy Express
- Spouse: Anju
- Children: 2

Nirmal Palazhi (born in Kozhikode, Kerala) is an Indian actor who has worked predominantly in the Malayalam film industry known for his work on Puthan Panam, Diwanji Moola Grand Prix and Ira.

== Personal life ==
Nirmal was born and settled in Kozhikode, a north district of Kerala State. He married Mrs. Anju and they have two children.

== Career ==
He started his career as a mimicry stage artist part of the Calicut-based stage group, Calicut V4U, Nirmal performed at various shows and gained popularity after his appearance on the comedy reality show Comedy Festival, aired in Mazhavil Manorama. He then went on to make his big screen debut with the film Kuttiyum Kolum, following which he was featured in Salala Mobiles, North 24 Kaatham, Puthan Panam, and Onpatham Valavinappuram. His recent releases include Orayiram Kinakkalal, Angane Njanum Premichu, Ente Mezhuthiri Athazhangal, Kuttimama, Kakshi Amminippilla and Edakkad Battalion 06.

== Filmography ==
=== Films ===
Key
†	Denotes films that have not yet been released

- All films are in Malayalam, unless otherwise noted.

Year	Title	Role	Notes
2013	Kutteem Kolum	Abutty	
2013	North 24 Kaatham		
2014	Salalah Mobiles		
2017	Puthan Panam	Sharaf	
2017	Onpatham Valavinappuram		
2017	Sunday Holiday	Vinu	
2017	Fukri	Kunjappu	
2017	Lavakusha	Sumesh	
2018	Orayiram Kinakkalal	Venu	
2018	Ente Mezhuthiri Athazhangal	Bobby	
2018	Angane Njanum Premichu		
2018	Diwanjimoola Grand Prix	Sivan	
2018	Ira	SI Sugunan	
2018	Aabhaasam		
2018	Johny Johny Yes Appa	Postman	
2018	Captain	Kittan	
2019	Sakalakalashala		
2019	Kakshi: Amminippilla	Mukesh Kumar / Mukeshan	
2019	Kuttymama		
2019	Edakkad Battalion 06	Shankaran	
2019	Mere Pyaare Deshvasiyon		
2019	Old is Gold		
2019	Mera Naam Shaji	Shaji Usman's friend	
2019	Mask	Abdu	
2019	Ulta	Madanan	
2020	Big Brother	Velappan	
2021	Ice Orathi	Palaka Baiju	
2021	Vellam	Vijayan	
2021	Yuvam	Adv. Vinod Janardhanan	
2021	Aapahasyam		
2021	Bheemante Vazhi	Manilal	
2022	Vamanan		
2022	Padachone Ingalu Kaatholee		
2023	Dear Vaappi	Riyaz's Brother In Law	
2023	Sulaikha Manzil	Anakath Akbar	
2023	Nadhikalil Sundari Yamuna	Sudhakaran	
2024	Vayasethrayaayi? Muppathiee..!!	Adv. Narayanan Potti	
2024	Swargathile Katturumbu		
2024	Prathibha Tutorials		
2024	Porattu Nadakam		
2024	Ajayante Randam Moshanam	Bhaskaran	
2025	Oru Jaathi Jathakam		
2025	Mother Mary		
2025	Detective Ujjwalan		
2026	Aadu 3	Policeman	
2026	Pathira Kurukkan †	TBA	

=== Television ===
Year	Name	Channel	Notes
	Comedy Festival	Mazhavil Manorama	Team member of V4U Calicut
2015	Uppum Mulakum	Flowers TV	As himself (episode 288)

=== Web series ===
Year	Title	Role	Network	Language
2022	Paper Rocket	Unni	ZEE5	Tamil
