= Sajith Jagadnandan =

Indian film director

- Born: Sajith Jagadnandan; 25 May 1981 (age 45); Thiruvananthapuram, Kerala, India
- Occupation: Film director
- Years active: 2007–present
- Notable work: Ore Mukham

Sajith Jagadnandan (born 25 May 1981) is an Indian film director who works in Malayalam films. He made his directorial debut with Ore Mukham (2016). He works as an associative director and director.

== Filmography ==
=== As Assistant Director ===
Year	Film	Director	Notes
2007	Ali Bhai	Shaji Kailas	
2009	Puthiya Mugham	Diphan	
2009	My Big Father	Mahesh P. Sreenivasan	

=== As director ===
year	Film	Credited As	Notes
2016	Ore Mukham	Director	
