= Prayaga Martin =

Indian actress (born 1995)

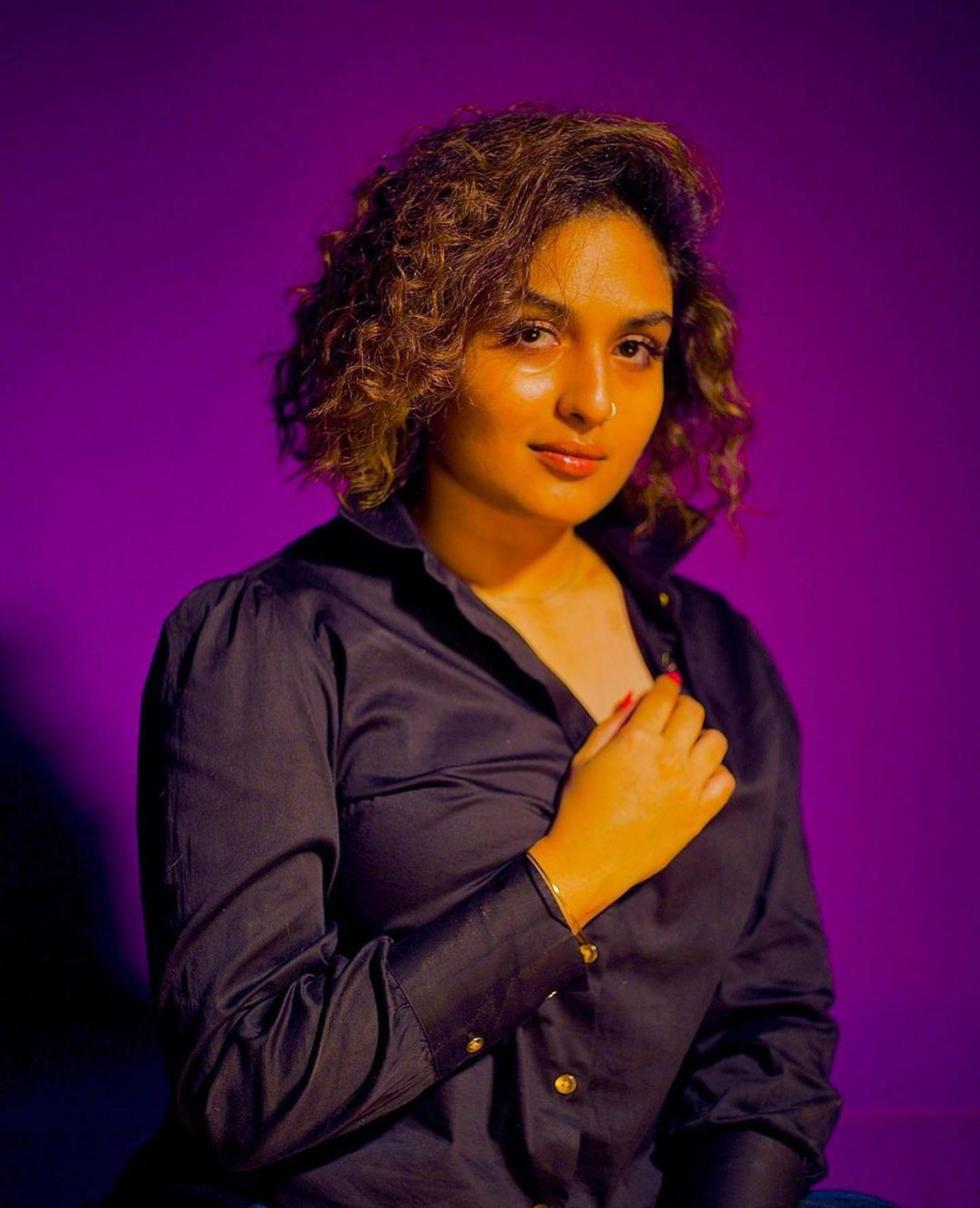
- Prayaga Martin
- Born: Prayaga Rose Martin; 18 May 1995 (age 31); Kochi, Kerala, India
- Education: St. Teresa's College
- Occupations: Actress; model
- Years active: 2009–present

Prayaga Rose Martin (born 18 May 1995) is an Indian actress who predominantly works in Malayalam cinema.

== Career ==
Director Mysskin cast Prayaga Martin for her first lead role in Pissasu. In 2016, Prayaga played her second lead role as Parvathy in the movie, Oru Murai Vanthu Parthaya, opposite Unni Mukundan. The film was well received by Malayalam moviegoers. In the same year, she replaced Madonna Sebastian in Siddhique's Fukri. She also played the female lead, alongside Dileep and Radhika Sarathkumar, in the political thriller Ramaleela. She made her debut in Kannada in a Ganesh starrer, Geetha. She has acted as judge of several TV shows like Midukki, Thakarppan Comedy, Star Magic and Comedy Stars Season 3.

== Controversy ==
On October 10, 2024, Prayaga and actor Sreenath Bhasi were questioned by police in connection with a narcotics case.

== Filmography ==
Year	Title	Role	Notes	Ref.
2009	Sagar Alias Jacky Reloaded	Azar's sister	Child artist	
2012	Ustad Hotel	Shahana's sister		
2014	Pisaasu	Bhavani	Tamil film	
2016	Oru Murai Vanthu Parthaya	Parvathy		
2016	Pa Va	Mary		
2016	Kattappanayile Rithwik Roshan	Ann Maria		
2016	Ore Mukham	Bhama		
2017	Fukri	Nafsi		
2017	Viswasapoorvam Mansoor	Mumtaz		
2017	Pokkiri Simon	Deepa		
2017	Ramaleela	Helena		
2018	Daivame Kaithozham K. Kumar Akanam	College student	Cameo appearance	
2018	Oru Pazhaya Bomb Kadha	Sruthi		
2019	Brother's Day	Ruby		
2019	Geetha	Geethanjali	Kannada film	
2019	Ulta	Paaru		
2020	Bhoomiyile Manohara Swakaryam	Anna		
2021	Kalathil Santhippom	Ashok's mistaken bride	Tamil film; Cameo	
2022	Thattassery Koottam	Herself	Cameo appearance	
2023	Enthada Saji	Annie		
2023	Dance Party	Roshni		
2023	Bullet Diaries	Linda Lukose		
2023	Jamalinte Punchiri	Seena		

=== Television ===
Year	Show	Role	Channel	Notes	Ref.
2017	D 4 Dance	Guest	Mazhavil Manorama		
2017	Onnum Onnum Moonu (season 2)	Guest	Mazhavil Manorama		
2017	Midukki	Judge	Mazhavil Manorama		
2018	Thakarppan comedy	Judge	Mazhavil Manorama		
2018	Laughing Villa	Guest	Surya TV		
2018	Onnum Onnum Moonu (season 3)	Guest	Mazhavil Manorama		
2018	The Happiness Project	Guest	Kappa TV		
2019	Comedy Stars (season 2)	judge	Asianet		
2019	Sa Re Ga Ma Pa Keralam	Guest	Zee Keralam		
2019	Badai Bungalow	Guest	Asianet		
2019	Paadam Namukku Paadam	Guest	Mazhavil Manorama		
2019	Comedy Stars @ 1111	Guest	Asianet		
2020	Kutti Pattalam (season 2)	Guest	Surya TV		
2020	Sa Re Ga Ma Pa Keralam	Guest	Zee Keralam		
2020	Onnum Onnum Moonu (season 4)	Guest	Mazhavil Manorama		
2021	Super 4 (season 2)	Guest	Mazhavil Manorama		
2021	Manam Pole Mangalyam	Herself	Zee Keralam	Cameo appearance	
2021	Super 4 Juniors	Guest	Mazhavil Manorama		
2021	Start Music (season 3)	Guest	Asianet	launch episode	
2022	Super Kudumbam	Team captain	Mazhavil Manorama	replaced Rimy Tomy	
2022	Comedy Stars season 3	Judge	Asianet		
2023	Dancing Stars	Guest	Asianet		
2026–present	Dance Dhamaka	Judge	Flowers TV		

=== Web series ===
Year	Series	Language	Role	Platform	Notes	Ref.
2021	Navarasa	Tamil	Nethra	Netflix	Segment: Guitar Kambi Mela Nindru	

=== Short films ===
Year	Film	Role	Language	Notes	Ref.
2019	Oru Breakup Kadha	Geetha	Malayalam		
2020	The Soldier In The Trench	Akrithi	English		
2020	Did You Sleep With Her	Alisha	English	Road Reel	
2021	A Moment of the Earth	Scuba Diver	English		
2021	Darling	Nethra	Tamil	Music album	
2022	Chilappol Deivam	Sara Mary	Malayalam		

== Accolades ==
Year	Award	Category	Film	Result	Ref.
2018	Asianet Film Awards	Most Popular Actress	Ramaleela	Won	
