= Ore Mukham =

- Theatrical release poster
- Directed by: Sajith Jagadnandan
- Screenplay by: Deepu; Sandeep Sadanandan
- Produced by: Jayalal Menon; Anil Biswas
- Starring: Dhyan Sreenivasan; Chemban Vinod Jose; Aju Varghese; Gayathri Suresh; Prayaga Martin; Jewel Mary
- Cinematography: Satheesh Kurup
- Edited by: Ranjan Abraham
- Music by: Bijibal
- Production company: Backwater Studios
- Distributed by: Magic Frames Release
- Release date: 18 November 2016
- Country: India
- Language: Malayalam

Ore Mukham (transl. Same Face) is a 2016 Indian Malayalam-language coming of age comedy crime mystery film directed by Sajith Jagadnandan and written by Deepu and Sandeep Sadanandan. It stars Dhyan Sreenivasan in the lead role. The film told in a non-linear style, is set in two periods. The period set in the 1980s tells the college life of the main protagonists. The other, set in the present day, describes the investigation into a series of murders involving them. Ore Mukham was released on 2 December 2016.

== Plot ==
Zachariah Pothen, a wealthy orphan and campus bully, spends his days chasing girls with his close-knit group of friends: Ayyappadas "Das", Devan, Prakashan, and Aravindan. However, shifting power dynamics within the group create tension and betrayal, eventually leading to tragic deaths. Years later, the group is plagued by a string of mysterious serial killings, prompting a police investigation. Suspicion falls on Pothen, who was the main suspect in the murders of Devan and Gayathri on their wedding day years ago and has been missing ever since. The story unfolds to reveal that Prakashan killed Devan and raped and murdered Gayathri as part of a treacherous scheme orchestrated by Aravindan. Aravindan's goons also killed Pothen, concealing his body to frame him for the crimes. Decades later, Das, who secretly witnessed the entire series of events, begins a revenge-driven killing spree to bring justice.

== Cast ==
- Dhyan Sreenivasan as Zachariah Pothen
- Chemban Vinod Jose as ACP Ashoka Chandran
- Jewel Mary as Amala
- Yazir Saleem as Devan
- Gayathri Suresh as Gayathri
- Sneha as Bhama
  - Prayaga Martin as Young Bhama
- Maniyanpilla Raju as Ayyappadas "Das"
  - Aju Varghese as Young Ayyappadas "Das"
- Devan as Aravindan
  - Arjun Nandhakumar as Young Aravindan
- Renji Panicker as Prakashan
  - Deepak Parambol as Young Prakashan
- Hareesh Peradi as Madhavan
- Abirami as Prof. Latha
- Sreejith Ravi as Varghese, Physical Education Teacher
  - Unni Karthikeyan as Young Varghese
- M. A. Nishad as Jacob Stephen
  - Juby Ninan as Young Jacob Stephen
- Devi Ajith as Mary
  - Kavya Suresh as Young Mary
- Neena Kurup as Rema
  - Orma Bose as Young Rema
- Roshni as Annakutty
- Pradeep Kottayam as Librarian
- Roy as Jeevan
- Remya Panicker as Shalini
- Noby Marcose as Sasi
- Sneha Sreekumar as Thankam Sasi

== Production ==
Ore Mukham is Sajith Jagadnandan's second movie and the first screenplay of Deepu S Nair and Sandeep Sadanandan. The photography took place in Sree Kerala Varma College, Thrissur in April 2016. The film was released on 2 December 2016.

=== Casting ===
Dhyan Sreenivasan signed on to play the male lead along with Aju Varghese, Deepak Parambol, and Arjun Nandakumar in the supporting roles. Prayaga Martin who played the lead lady in Oru Murai Vanth Parthya and Gayathri Suresh who made her debut in Jamna Pyari signed on to play the female leads. Renji Panicker and Chemban Vinod Jose are also part of the cast. Amala Paul signed on to play a significant role in the movie. However, she was replaced by anchor-turned-actress Jewel Mary in the movie after the former opted out due to date issues as the shoot of Shajahanum Pareekuttiyum was extended due to unexpected rains. In May 2016, actress Abhirami signed on to play the role of a lecturer who inspires Zachariah.

== Soundtrack ==
Music: Bijibal

Lyrics: Rafeeq Ahamed, Lalji Kattiparamban

Track list
No.	Title	Singer(s)	Length
1.	"Sadirumai"	Vineeth Sreenivasan	3:53
2.	"Aarum ariyathoru"	Madhu Balakrishnan	3:08
3.	"Ore mukham"	Yazin Nizar	1:51
Total length:			8:48
