= Ullozhukku =

- Theatrical release poster
- Directed by: Christo Tomy
- Written by: Christo Tomy
- Produced by: Ronnie Screwvala; Honey Trehan; Abhishek Chaubey
- Starring: Urvashi; Parvathy Thiruvothu; Arjun Radhakrishnan; Veenah Naair
- Cinematography: Shehnad Jalal
- Edited by: Kiran Das
- Music by: Sushin Shyam
- Production companies: RSVP Movies; MacGuffin Pictures
- Distributed by: Central Pictures
- Release date: 21 June 2024
- Running time: 123 minutes
- Country: India
- Language: Malayalam
- Box office: ₹4.46 crores

Ullozhukku (transl. Undercurrent) is a 2024 Indian Malayalam-language drama film written and directed by Christo Tomy. The film stars Urvashi and Parvathy Thiruvothu, with Arjun Radhakrishnan, Alencier Ley Lopez, Prashanth Murali, and Jaya Kurup appearing in supporting roles. It was selected for the International Competition: Fiction strand at the 2nd Eikhoigi Imphal International Film Festival 2025.

In 2025, the film won the National Film Award for best feature film in Malayalam.

The screenplay of the film won the Cinestaan India's Storytellers Contest in 2018. Released on 21 June 2024, the film received widespread critical acclaim. It achieved moderate success at the box office.

== Plot ==
The film is set in the flooded regions of Alappuzha, Kerala, India. Anju is married to Thomaskutty and the two live with Thomaskutty's mother Leelamma. Thomaskutty is chronically ill and dying. Anju also has an active affair with her former long time lover Rajeev. Anju was forced to marry Thomaskutty after her parents discovered her relationship with Rajeev and did not approve of them both.

Anju realises that she is pregnant with Rajeev's child. In the meantime Thomaskutty becomes severely ill and passes away. The rains of that year flood the region bringing waters indoors and thus delaying Thomaskutty's funeral. Leelamma refuses to vacate the place and stays with Thomaskutty's body in the house. Leelamma discovers Anju's affair and confronts her after which Anju admits that the child is not Thomaskutty's. The truth is soon revealed to Anju's parents, Thomaskutty's sister and aunt. Anju discovers that her mother hid Thomaskutty's illness from her before the wedding.

Meanwhile, Rajeev pressures Anju to get Thomaskutty's house inheritance in her name so they can have a good start to their life.

Anju wants to leave to begin a life with Rajeev after the funeral which keeps getting delayed. Whether she manages to convince the people around her and how they react form the crux of the movie. The film ends with a bittersweet ending where Anju decides to leave Rajeev and live with Leelamma.

== Cast ==
- Urvashi as Leelamma
- Parvathy Thiruvothu as Anju
- Arjun Radhakrishnan as Rajeev (voice dubbed by Roshan Mathew)
- Veenah Naair as Sister Rosamma
- Prashanth Murali as Thomaskutty
- Shebin Benson as Juman (Rajeev's friend)
- Alencier Ley Lopez as George
- Jaya Kurup as Jiji
- Smruthi Anish as Sheba, Thomaskutty's elder sister
- Alexander Attupuram as Leelamma's neighbour

== Release ==
=== Theatrical ===
Ullozhukku released in theatres on 21 June 2024 to overwhelming positive response, garnering praise for the direction and performances of Urvashi and Parvathy. The film had a good word of mouth publicity and turned out to be a commercial success at the box office.

=== Marketing ===
Prior to the film's release, Urvashi promoted the film on the TV show Bigg Boss (season 6), hosted by Mohanlal. She entered the Bigg Boss House on Day 88, met the contestants and shared details about the film.

=== Home media ===
The digital streaming rights of the film were acquired by Amazon Prime Video (India only) and Simply South OTT (Outside India). It began streaming on Simply South from 26 July 2024 excluding India. In India, the film started streaming through Amazon Prime Video from 2 August 2024. After its streaming rights on Amazon Prime Video expired, the film was acquired by Netflix and began streaming there from 26 December 2025.

== Reception ==
On the review aggregator website Rotten Tomatoes, 100% of 7 critics' reviews are positive, with an average rating of 7.7/10.

Divya Nair of Rediff.com rated 4/5 stars and observed "What makes Ullozhukku worth recommending is its ability to surrender to the surprises and yet grow with its characters." S R Praveen of The Hindu wrote "Urvashi’s powerhouse performance carries this haunting drama". Anna Mathews of The Times of India rated 3.5/5 stars and reviewed "Urvashi's superb presence & range carries this beautiful emotional story". Kirubhakar Purushothaman of The Indian Express rated 4/5 stars and observed "A subtle and profound drama backed by incredible Urvashi and Parvathy". Sowmya Rajendran of The News Minute rated 4/5 stars and wrote "Urvashi, Parvathy are brilliant in Ullozhukku, a tense exploration of family dynamics". Priyanka Sundar of Firstpost rated 4/5 stars and reviewed "The 'undercurrent' in this film comes to life with Urvashi and Parvathy's sheer brilliant performance". Swathi P Ajith of Onmanorama wrote "Urvashi dominates in must-watch tale of empathy and love: 'Ullozhukku' rivets from start to finish". Aswathy Gopalakrishnan of Film Companion reviewed "an astounding urvashi headlines a tender film on love that defies conventions".

== Accolades ==
National Film Awards

- National Film Award for Best Malayalam Feature Film
- Best Actress in a Supporting Role - Urvashi

Kerala State Film Awards

- Best Actress - Urvashi
- Best Dubbing Artist - Roshan Mathew (dubbed for Arjun Radhakrishnan)
- Best Sound Design - Jayadevan Chakkadath, Anil Radhakrishnan

Indian Film Festival of Melbourne

- Best Actress – Parvathy Thiruvothu
