= Arjun Radhakrishnan =

Indian actor

- Born: Nagercoil, Tamil Nadu, India
- Education: Savitribai Phule Pune University
- Occupation: Actor
- Years active: 2017–present

Arjun Radhakrishnan is an Indian actor who works in Malayalam and Hindi films. He played the role of APJ Abdul Kalam in the SonyLIV web series Rocket Boys (2022) and has since acted in films such as Jhund (2022), Dear Friend (2022), Pada (2022) and Kannur Squad (2023).

== Personal life ==
Arjun Radhakrishnan was born in Nagercoil, Tamil Nadu to a Malayali father and Tamil mother. He was brought up in Pune and graduated with a BSc in Statistics from Savitribai Phule Pune University. He worked at KPMG before resigning to pursue acting.

== Career ==
He debuted as an actor in an independent film titled Shreelancer in 2017. He made his breakthrough in the web series Rocket Boys playing the role of APJ Abdul Kalam in which his performance was praised.

== Filmography ==
=== Films ===
Year	Title	Role	Language	Notes
2017	Shreelancer	Shreepad Naik	Hindi; English	
2022	Jhund	Arjun Borade	Hindi	
2022	Pada	Ajay Shripad Dange IAS	Malayalam	
2022	Dear Friend	Shyam	Malayalam	
2023	Pop City	Gulshan Kumar	Hindi	
2023	Kannur Squad	Ameer Shah	Malayalam	
2024	Ullozhukku	Rajeev	Malayalam	
2025	Identity	Amar Felix	Malayalam	

=== Television ===
Year	Title	Role	Language	Notes
2021-2023	Rocket Boys	APJ Abdul Kalam	Hindi	
2021	Love in the Times of Corona		English; Hindi	Television film
2025	Kerala Crime Files 2	SI Noble	Malayalam	

== Accolades ==
Award	Category	Film	Result	Ref.
IIFA Utsavam	Performance in a Negative Role	Kannur Squad	Won	
