= Baby Jean =

Indian rapper, singer, songwriter and actor

- Also known as: Baby Jean
- Born: Habish Rahman; Malappuram, Kerala, India
- Origin: Othalur, Malappuram, Kerala, India
- Genres: Hip hop, Indian hip hop, Malayalam rap
- Occupations: Rapper, singer, songwriter, actor
- Years active: 2023–present
- Label: Mass Appeal India

Baby Jean (born Habish Rahman) is an Indian rapper, singer, songwriter and actor from Kerala. He is associated with the Malayalam hip-hop scene and gained popularity with songs such as "Kaayi". He has been recognized as one of the emerging names in Malayalam rap by publications such as The Indian Express, Onmanorama and Rolling Stone India. He made his acting debut in the 2025 Malayalam film Alappuzha Gymkhana.

== Early life ==
Habish Rahman was born and raised in Othalur in Malappuram district, Kerala. In an interview with Samayam Malayalam, he spoke about the difficulty of pursuing rap music professionally and the challenges involved in gaining acceptance for it as a career path.

== Career ==
=== Music ===
Baby Jean emerged as part of a younger generation of Malayalam rappers whose work gained visibility in the early 2020s. Rolling Stone India included him in its Future of Music 2024 list, noting songs such as "Bandana" and "Thalakkanam" among the tracks that helped establish his profile.

His song "Kaayi" drew significant attention on social media and contributed to his wider recognition in Kerala. Publications covering the growth of Malayalam rap have grouped him alongside artists like Hanumankind, Fejo, Dabzee and Vedan.

In 2024 Baby Jean appeared on "Ballaatha Jaathi", a hip-hop single led by actor and musician Neeraj Madhav, alongside Dabzee.

He later contributed to film songs with "Marpapa" from Marco, which gained online traction after release. In 2025, he was credited among the performers of "Neon Ride" from Officer on Duty.

=== Acting ===
Baby Jean made his acting debut in Khalid Rahman's 2025 Malayalam film Alappuzha Gymkhana, playing the character David John. He had been cast in Aashiq Abu's Rifle Club but was unable to continue due to scheduling conflicts.

== Artistry and reception ==
Baby Jean has been described as part of the wave of younger artists who helped bring Malayalam rap into wider public visibility in the 2020s. A feature in The Indian Express on a football-related rap track noted his delivery and wordplay as energetic. Rolling Stone India described his work as combining hip-hop with local cultural textures and language.

In 2025, comments made by Baby Jean regarding rapper Vedan were reported by DoolNews, reflecting his growing visibility within Malayalam popular culture and hip-hop discourse.

== Discography ==
=== Selected singles ===
Year	Title	Notes
2024	"Kaayi"	Single with RXZOR
2024	"Padachatta"	Single
2024	"Ballaatha Jaathi"	With Neeraj Madhav, Dabzee and Rzee
2025	"VADHAM"	Single with RXZOR
2025	"MAAPLA"	Single with RXZOR and Sulthan

=== Film songs ===
Year	Song	Film	Notes
2024	"Marpapa"	Marco	
2025	"Chal Chal Patak Doon Maar"	Deva	Music by Jakes Bejoy
2025	"Neon Ride"	Officer on Duty	With Zeba Tommy and Ramya RamC; music by Jakes Bejoy

== Filmography ==
Year	Title	Role	Notes	Ref.
2025	Alappuzha Gymkhana	David "DJ" John	Acting debut	
2026	Bharathanatyam 2 Mohiniyattam	Subhash		
2026	Titans	Peter		

== See also ==
- Malayalam hip-hop
- Music of Kerala
- Indian hip-hop
