= Fejo (rapper) =

Indian rapper and songwriter

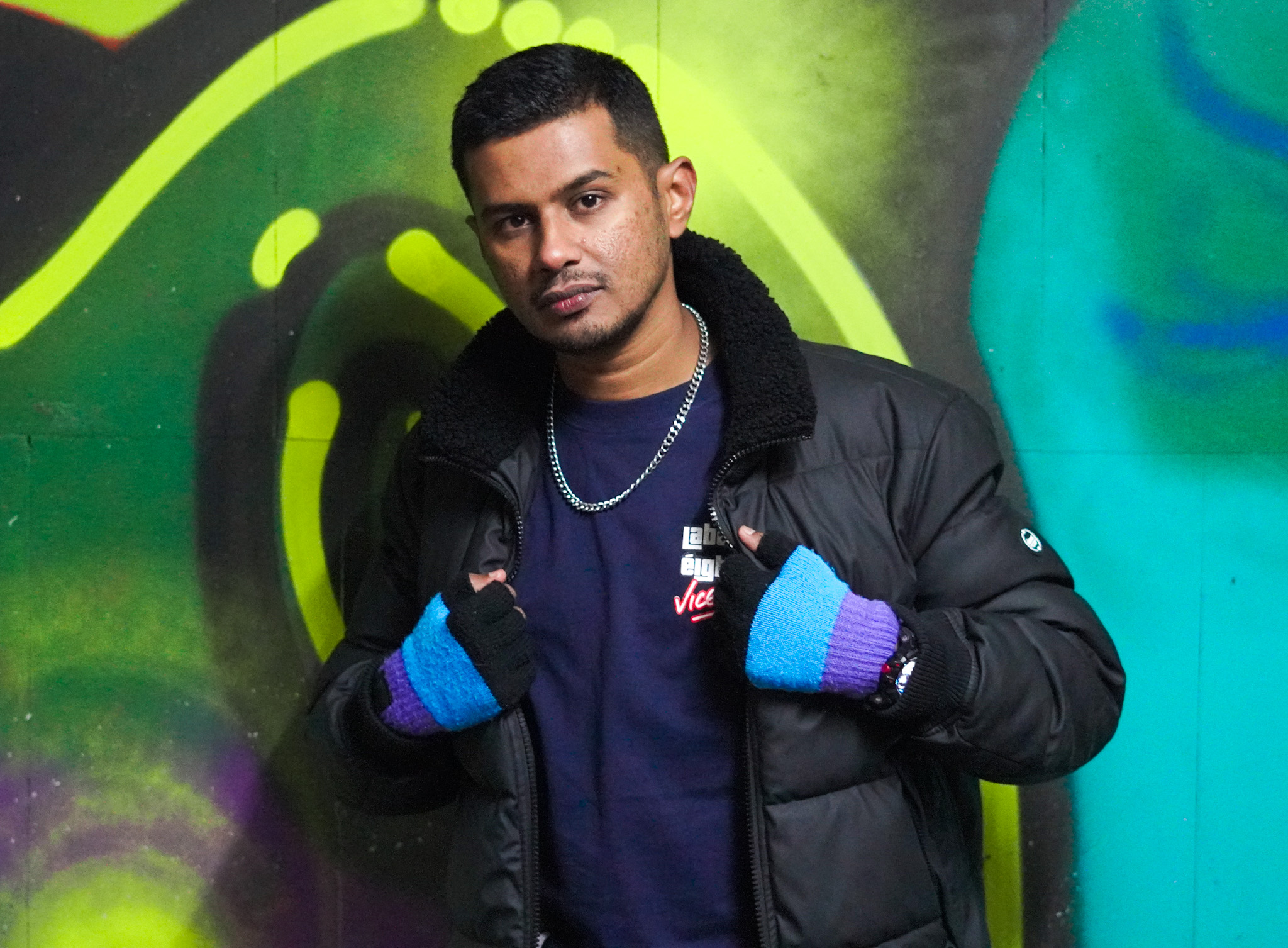
- Fejo in 2023

Background information
- Born
- Origin: Vytilla, Kochi, Kerala, India
- Genres: Hip hop; pop; Filmi
- Occupations: Rapper; singer; songwriter; actor
- Years active: 2009–present

Febin Joseph, better known by his stage name Fejo, is an Indian rapper, singer, songwriter and actor from Kerala. He started his solo career professionally in 2009, and is considered the pioneer of Malayalam hip-hop, noted for his socio-political themes. He is known for the songs like "Thalayude Vilayattu" from Aaraattu (2022), "Aparaada Panka" from Maradona (2018), "Ayudhameduda" from Ranam (2018), and "Ee Thazhvara" from Athiran (2019).

== Early life and education ==
Febin was born to Joseph and Leonitha in Vytilla, Kochi, Kerala, India. He developed an interest in music and songwriting at a young age. He completed B.Tech in Electrical and Electronics while building his musical career.

== Career ==
He started his Indie music career in 2009 and has popularised the subversive music genres in Kerala and experimenting with different genres, predominantly Hip Hop/Rap in Malayalam. He has performed in various concerts including MTV Hustle, Comedy Utsavam, Flowers Top Singer, Star Singer and concerts like Breezer Vivid Shuffle, Mirchi Music Awards 2020, Mazhavil Music Awards, Para Hip Hop Fest etc.

Fejo has collaborated with various artists like Raftaar, M.G Sreekumar, Shreya Ghoshal, Shankar Mahadevan, Sushin Shyam, Jakes Bejoy, Stephen Devassy, Deepak Dev, Bijibal, Sam CS, Vineeth Sreenivasan, Shaan Rahman, Justin Varghese, Rahul Raj. His notable singles include "Malsaram Ennodu Thanne", "Theruvinte Kalakaran", "Avasaram Tharu", "Dorothy", "Koottilitta Thatha", "Vere Level", "Koode Thullu", "Mahanubhavulu", and "Vazhikatti". His first rap for a feature film came in May 2018 with the song Aparaada Panka for the movie Maradona, starring Tovino Thomas. The same year, he contributed rap verses for the song Ayudhameduda in the film Ranam starring Prithviraj Sukumaran. Later in April 2019, he rapped for the song Ee Thazhvara from Athiran, starring Fahad Fazil, and in 2021 he performed rap in the song Naade Naattaare from the movie Operation Java starring Lukman Avaran & Balu Varghese.

In 2022, he made his acting debut in the movie Naradan directed by Aashiq Abu starring Tovino Thomas & Anna Ben. Later that year, he also sang Thalayude Vilayattu with M.G. Sreekumar for the Mohanlal-starrer Aarattu. He collaborated on Nammal Onnale with Varkey for Netflix and worked with Deepak Dev for Meta's Instagram 1 Minute Music campaign. In 2023, Fejo composed and performed the opening song for Bigg Boss Malayalam Season 5, hosted by Mohanlal. He also sang for King of Kotha with Benny Dayal, Shreya Ghoshal, & Jakes Bejoy, and performed in RDX for Sam CS. Additionally, he collaborated on Sambar for Def Jam India, alongside Thirumali and Dabzee.

In 2024, Fejo performed the opening act at the inaugural function of the Super League Kerala, sharing the stage with DJ Sekhar, Stephen Devassy, Sivamani & Jacqueline Fernandez. In October 2024, he became the first Malayalam rapper to perform in Red Bull 64 Bars with his track Top Tier Talk, created with Parimal Shais. Later in 2024, Fejo made his Kollywood debut with the song Puli Yaaru Nari Yaaru, performed alongside Anthony Daasan, composed by Ajesh for the Tamil movie Alangu. In December 2024, Fejo signed with Sony Music India and released his first song under the label, Aayiram Aura. The song gained attention and trended at number 3 on YouTube after its release.

In January 2025, he made his playback singing debut in the Malayalam film Painkili with the song Heart Attack, marking his first time singing in a movie instead of rapping. It was composed by Justin Varghese and penned by Vinayak Sasikumar. Following the success of the song, Fejo received further opportunities as a playback singer, performing Madi Raja for Daveed, Neptune for Detective Ujjwalan, and Onam Mood for the film Sahasam, which trended at number 1 on YouTube. He also collaborated with Shankar Ehsaan Loy for their first Malayalam film Chatha Pacha, rapping for the title track. In December 2025, Fejo won two Mazhavil Manorama Music Awards, receiving the Special Jury Mention (Singer) for Heart Attack and the Song of the Year award for Onam Mood.

In May 2026, Fejo collaborated with composer Vishnu Vijay on the song IYKYK for the Malayalam film Athiradi, starring Basil Joseph and Tovino Thomas. It was released as the film's first single and entered several music charts. In October 2026, he performed at Kannur Dasara for the second consecutive year, attracting a large crowd. The same month, Sony Music announced The Flip Scene, a project featuring rap artists reworking older songs into hip-hop tracks, with Fejo among the participants. Later that year, Fejo collaborated with Hiphop Tamizha on their comeback single Return of the Dragon Machi and appeared in its music video.

== Filmography ==
Year	Film title	Role	Notes	Ref.
2022	Naradan	Mudiyan	Debut film	

== Discography ==
=== Film songs ===
Year	Film	Song	Music composer	Co-singer(s)	Label	Notes	Ref.
2018	Maradona	"Aparaada Panka"	Sushin Shyam		Mini Music - Divo	Debut film	
2018	Ranam	"Ayudhameduda"	Jakes Bejoy	Ajaey Shravan, FuRa, Jakes Bejoy	Goodwill Entertainments		
2019	Athiran	"Ee Thazhvara"	PS Jayhari	Amrita Jayakumar	Manorama Music		
2019	Jeem Boom Bhaa	"Kalathe Vellum Theeyeda"	PS Jayhari	Crishna	Millennium Audios		
2019	Kalki	"Police Re Entry Song"	Jakes Bejoy		Goodwill Entertainments		
2019	Kalki	"K Swag - Red Blue Black"	Jakes Bejoy		Goodwill Entertainments	lyrics with Joe Paul	
2019	Under World	"Paravakalini"	Yakzan Gary Pereira, Neha Nair	Sooraj Santhosh	Friday Film House		
2020	Uriyadi	"Olakkalu Seelakkalu"	Ishaan Dev	Rock Soman	Manorama Music		
2021	Operation Java	"Naade Naattaare"	Jakes Bejoy	Thirumali	V Cinemas International		
2021	Keshu Ee Veedinte Nadhan	"Ashichu Mohichu Keshu"	Nadirshah, Bijibal		Millennium Audios		
2022	Aarattu	"Thalayude Vilayattu"	Rahul Raj	M.G Sreekumar	Saina Music		
2022	Aarattu	"Naadan Adi"	Rahul Raj		Saina Music		
2022	Naradan	"Thannatthaan"	Sekhar Menon	Manchild	OPM Records		
2022	Pathrosinte Padappukal	"Kali Kalam"	Jakes Bejoy		JXB Records		
2022	Trojan	"Vandiyodu Shankara"	Sejo John		Manorama Music		
2022	Ullasam	"Ullasamo"	Shaan Rahman		Satyam Audios		
2023	Pappa	"Raghupati Raghava"	Rahul Subrahmanian				
2023	Purusha Pretham	"Amali"	Ajmal Hasbulla		Think Music		
2023	Janaki Jaane	"Udal Manam"	Sibi Mathew Alex		Manorama Music		
2023	Vaathil	"Jeevithamenna Thamaasha"	Sejo John	Shahabaz Aman	Saregama		
2023	King of Kotha	"Kalapakkaara"	Jakes Bejoy	Shreya Ghoshal & Benny Dayal	Sony Music		
2023	King of Kotha	"King of Kotha - Title Track"	Shaan Rahman	Nithya Mammen	Sony Music		
2023	RDX	"Mura Padichathu"	Sam CS		Saregama	for OST	
2023	RDX	"Adiyodadi"	Sam CS	Sam CS	Saregama	for OST	
2023	Dance Party	"Vittu Pidi"	Rahul Raj		Manorama Music		
2024	Oru Kattil Oru Muri	"Rukmangadhavidhi"	Varkey	Narayani Gopan	123Musix		
2024	Alangu	"Puli Yaaru Nari Yaaru"	Ajesh	Anthony Daasan	Sony Music		
2025	Painkili	"Heart Attack"	Justin Varghese		Think Music	lyrics Vinayak Sasikumar	
2025	Daveed	"Madi Raja"	Justin Varghese		Think Music	lyrics Suhail Koya	
2025	Detective Ujjwalan	"Neptune"	Rzee		Saregama	lyrics Manu Manjith	
2025	Sahasam	"Onam Mood"	Bibin Ashok	Himna Hilari & Hinitha Hilari	Saregama	lyrics Vinayak Sasikumar	
2025	Karam	"Uyarnnu Vaa"	Shaan Rahman	Vineeth Sreenivasan	Saregama		
2025	Athi Bheekara Kaamukan	"Delulu Delulu"	Bibin Ashok		Saregama	lyrics HeyKarthii	
2026	Chatha Pacha	"Chatha Pacha Title Track"	Shankar Ehsaan Loy	Shankar Mahadevan, Siddharth Mahadevan	T-Series Malayalam		
2026	Aashakal Ayiram	"Kodumudi Kayareda"	Sanal Dev	Vipin K Sasidharan, Sruthy Sivadas	Sree Gokulam Movies	lyrics with Sharfu	
2026	Masthishka Maranam	"Ilama Pazham"	Varkey	Mariya Johny	Saregama		
2026	Madhuvidhu	"Pokum Beyond"	Hesham Abdul Wahab		Zee Music Company	for OST	
2026	Madhuvidhu	"Puthan Penne Manavatty"	Hesham Abdul Wahab		Zee Music Company		
2026	Athiradi	"IYKYK"	Vishnu Vijay	Poornima Kannan	Saregama	lyrics Suhail Koya	

=== Songs featured ===
Year	Song title	Featuring Artists	Label	Notes	Ref.
2018	Shuffle Track 2.0 (Live Life in Color)	Raftaar, Varun Dhawan		for Breezer Vivid Shuffle	
2019	I Live the Metro Life	Masala Coffee		for Kochi Metro Rail Limited	
2022	Urula	Bijibal, Soumya Ramakrishnan	Inlight Creations	International Dance Day (for Dancity)	
2022	Nammal Onnalle	Varkey, Blesslee	Netflix	for Netflix India (Onam Song)	
2022	Supply Anthem	Shabareesh Varma, Varkey	Entri Coding	for Entri Elevate	
2022	Aiwa	Deepak Dev	Avenirtek, Meta	for Meta (Instagram 1 Minute Music)	
2023	Surangani	Masala Coffee	One Digital	for Ektara Album	
2023	Yodhakkal Original	Thudwiser		for Bigg Boss Malayalam Season 5	
2023	Sambar	Thirumali & Dabzee	Def Jam		
2024	Utharam Para	AbRaw	Saina Music Indie		
2024	Top Tier Talk	Parimal Shais	Def Jam	for Red Bull 64 Bars	
2024	Aayiram Aura	Jeffin Jestin	Sony Music India		
2025	Sick	Jeffin Jestin	Sony Music India		
2025	Ulsava Rave	Thirumali, Thudwiser	Universal Music India	for Hyundai Spotlight	
2025	Baby Cool Ayirunne	Jeffin Jestin	Sony Music India		
2025	Vazhikatti	Jeffin Justin, Daleema	Sony Music India		
2026	For A Reason	Jeffin Jestin	Sony Music India		
2026	Return Of The Dragon Machi	Hiphop Tamizha	Virgin Music Group		

== Television ==
=== Music and reality shows ===
Year	Show	Judges / Artists	Co Artists / Guests	Host	Channel	Notes
2018	Breezer Vivid Shuffle	Raftaar	Deep Kalsi, Girish Nakod	Vineeth "Beep" Kumar	MTV India	for Grand Finale 2018
2019	MTV Hustle	Raftaar, Nucleya, Raja Kumari	MC Altaf, Rapper Big Deal, Raiychu	Gaelyn Mendonca	MTV India	for Grand Finale 2019
2019	Comedy Utsavam	Tini Tom, Kalabhavan Prajod, Shaju		Mithun Ramesh	Flowers TV	Ep. 396
2019	Comedy Utsavam	Sudheesh, Thesni Khan, Kalabhavan Prajod	Adarsh ADJ	Mithun Ramesh	Flowers TV	Ep. 495
2020	Para HipHop Festival	Aashiq Abu, Bijibal, Shahabaz Aman	Blesslee	DJ Sekhar & Sreenath Bhasi	Kochi Music Foundation	Season 1
2021	Mirchi Music Awards	with Chandan Shetty, Bjorn Surrao & Roll Rida	Blesslee & Adarsh ADJ	Shilpa Bala	Asianet	for Mirchi Malayalam
2021	Top Singer	M.G Sreekumar, Innocent, Afsal, Rahul Raj	Nadirshah, Aparna Balamurali	Meenakshi Anoop	Flowers TV	Ep. 5 (Star Nite)
2021	Bumper Chiri Agosham	Manju Pillai, Sabumon, Naseer Sankranthi	Adarsh ADJ, Baiju Santhosh	Karthik Surya	Mazhavil Manorama	Ep. 1
2021	Bumper Chiri Agosham	Manju Pillai, Sabumon, Naseer Sankranthi	Adarsh & Ardhra, Thankachan Vithura	Karthik Surya	Mazhavil Manorama	Christmas Special
2022	Star Singer	K.S Chithra, Sharreth, G. Venugopal	Stephen Devassy, Suraj Venjaramoodu	Jewel Mary	Asianet	Ep. 75
2022	Mazhavil Music Awards	with Stephen Devassy	Indulekha Warrier	Swasika	Mazhavil Manorama	for ManoramaMAX
2023	Comedy Utsavam	Tini Tom, Kalabhavan Prajod	Adarsh ADJ	Mithun Ramesh	Flowers TV	Season 3 Ep. 31
2023	Bigg Boss Malayalam			Mohanlal	Asianet TV	Season 5 Ep. 1
2025	Mazhavil Music Awards		Bibin Ashok, Adarsh ADJ, Himna Hilari, Hinitha Hilary	Ranjini Haridas, Aswathy Sreekanth	Mazhavil Manorama	
2026	Flowers Music Awards		Vedan, Adarsh ADJ	Manikuttan, Meera Anil	Flowers TV	
2026	Atham Pathu Ruchi		Anju Joseph, Adarsh ADJ	Mathukutty Xavier, Twinkle Sheethal	Mazhavil Manorama	Ep. 9

== Awards & Recognitions ==
Year	Award Name	Category	Nominated Work	Result	Ref
2025	Mazhavil Music Awards	Special Jury Mention (Singer)	Heart Attack (Painkili)	Won	
2025	Mazhavil Music Awards	Song of the Year	Onam Mood (Sahasam)	Won	
2026	Flowers Music Awards	People's Choice : Hip Hop Star	Vazhikatti, Aayiram Aura	Won	
