= Malayalam hip-hop =

Subgenre of hip hop originating in Kerala, India

Malayalam hip hop is a genre of popular music developed in Kerala starting in around 2004. The term has also come to be used as an alternative for rap music, and even pop music, which involves rappers of South Asian origins.

== Overview ==
Street Academics were the first ever hip hop band to be established in 2009, in Malayalam hip hop. They started with freestyling.

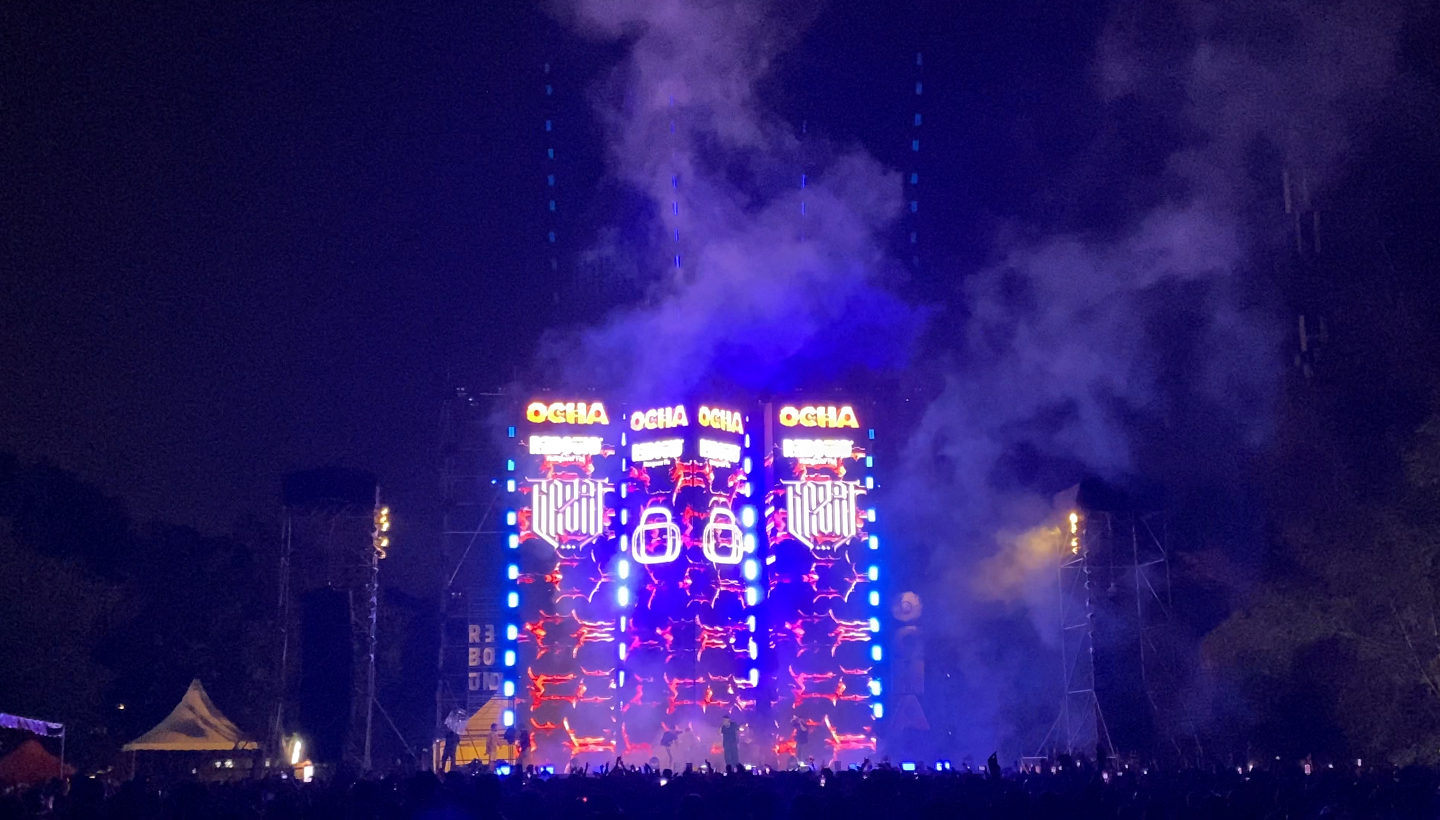
The Ocha Music Festival organized by Saina Music Indie and Pacayafog held in Bolgatty Palace in 2024 was the biggest Hip Hop stage which Kerala has seen, Ocha played a crucial part in its first season in 2023 to showcase the raw talent in the state such as baby jean doing his first stage performance, Season 2 introduced the Rising Panther Gabri too .

Malayalam hip-hop was made widespread by FEJO and ThirumaLi during the 2018 - 2019. FEJO's first debut release in 2018 "Vere Level" and ThirumaLi's first debut hit "Malayali Da," in 2019, marked the onset of Malayalam rap.

In 2022. Saina Music a Homegrown Label which was a Household label for last 4 decades signed the first track with Dabzee while representing Manushyar, Which happened to be just after the Event Utopian Dystopia which showcased few talents across the state, Meanwhile the label has been in the front row for the new and unrecognized artist to showcase and release their Indie tracks to the public. In 2023, Mass Appeal India initiated a scouting program in the South Indian market to sign Malayalam hip-hop artists. Later, Spotify officially announced that Malayalam music consumption has increased, with a significant portion attributed to Malayalam hip-hop. During the period, The Spotify has noticed several releases by Malayalam hip hop artists featured in the Global and Hip hop Charts.

A hip-hop music festival called "Ocha Music Festival", was introduced in 2023. It is currently one of the leading hip-hop music festivals in Kerala. It is usually held in the Bolgatty Palace Arena in Kochi.

In 2024, The hip hop artist Dabzee significantly gained fame, producing and singing for Malayalam movies. He is the first ever artist from Kerala to perform at Earth Soul in Coca-Cola Arena

== Major artists ==
List of established artists in Malayalam hip hop genre.

- Dabzee
- ThirumaLi
- FEJO
- MC Couper
- Vedan
- Baby Jean
- NJ
- Parimal Shais
- San Jaimt

== See also ==
- Indian hip-hop
- Gully rap
