= Street Academics =

Indian hip-hop group

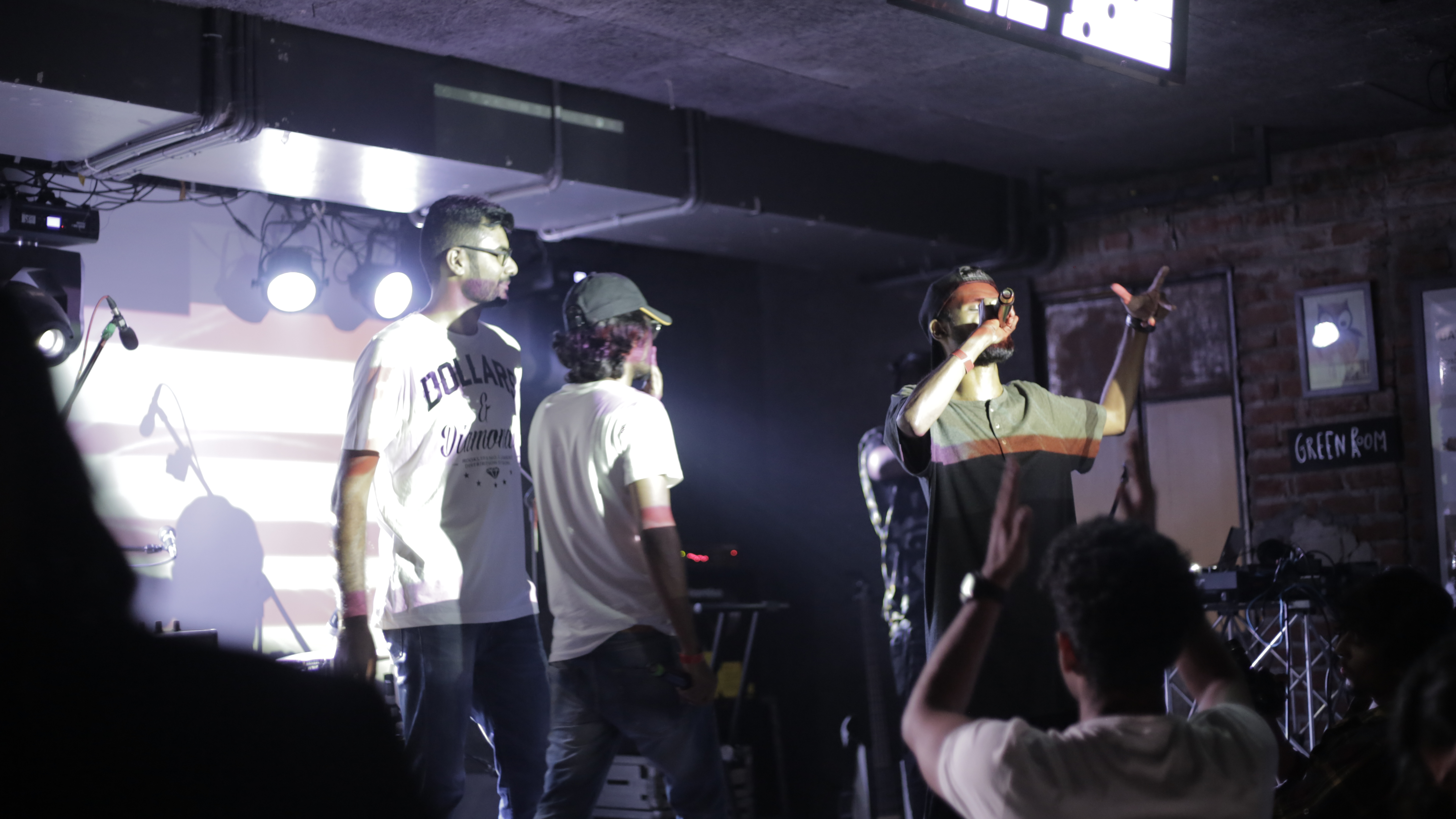
- Street Academics at The Humming Tree, Bangalore 2017

Background information
- Origin: Kerala, India
- Genre: Alternative hip-hop
- Instruments: Vocals, Sampler, Drum machine, Synthesizer, Turntables.
- Years active: 2009–present

Street Academics is an Indian alternative hip-hop group from Kerala, known for their songs blending Malayalam, English and Tamil lyrics. The collective, made up of rappers from various districts, is noted for emphasizing contemporary and philosophical themes ranging from social realism to dystopian fantasy. They collaborate with projects like Mappila Lahala and Palakkadan Dystopia, to release songs that focus on having cultural discussions set in avant-garde backdrops.

== History ==
Street Academics was an idea brought forward by Rjv Ernesto in 1999, as a small group for spoken word poetry and making pause tapes. Later he was introduced to Haris Saleem through hip-hop communities in Myspace and Orkut. After recording various demo tracks, they brought in Amjad Nadeem, Abhimanyu Raman and Pranav to move forward as a hip-hop collective in 2009. Keyboardist & music producer Ruthin Thej worked with the group to produce a couple of singles, before leaving to pursue his career as keyboardist for Thaikkudam Bridge. Later Vivek Radhakrishnan joined the group as the DJ/producer providing a bass-oriented sound. They started collaborating with the cultural music collective Mappila Lahala, led by filmmaker Muhsin Parari, to release politically oriented singles which featured veteran actor Mamukkoya and national award-winning composer Bijibal. The group has also formed avant garde hip-hop project Palakkadan Dystopia to release singles and went on to collaborate with experimental theatre acts, performing shows which combined spoken word, theatre, hip-hop music & graffiti. After working on singles and compilations over the years, the group released a complete multilingual album titled "Loop" loosely based on seven deadly sins.

On July 13, 2019, a live performance of Street Academics along with Bandish Projekt and Swadesi, was interrupted by a group of people who demanded the venue officials to play Kannada songs, instead of the group's original Malayalam tracks, as they were in Bengaluru. The group's set was cut short and forced off stage. After the performance, rapper/vocalist Amjad and few of his friends were taken away by the police, allegedly for causing public nuisance. Venue management later released a public statement, apologizing to Street Academics regarding the incident. The group released a protest song titled "Hara Hara" along with a music video, and performed it live during Citizenship Amendment Act protests at Kozhikode.

== Themes and influences ==
Members state that they started off through slam poetry before getting introduced to hip-hop music. Rjv Ernesto cites spoken word poetry and sports/pro-wrestling commentary as his influence in rap music. Developing an interest towards drum solos, he recalls creating beats by cutting out bits of tape from cassettes using a razor blade and glueing them back before inserting the tape into the cartridge. The group's multilingual lyricism usually brings up questions of expression and identity, affirming the place of vernacular rap in India, being one of the first acts to do so. Street Academics is considered to be one of the oldest independent hip-hop outfits in India. They are noted for pioneering Malayalam rap with serious content & multisyllabic rhyme patterns, against the comical parody image that rap/hip-hop music has had in their region. Even though the production relies on minimal boom bap oriented sampling as the backbone, the collective effort exhibits influences of musique concrète, lo-fi, glitch, folk, ambient, R&B, jazz poetry, grime and funk. Most of the themes are set in an alternate reality or a post-apocalyptic world, often presented from the narrative mode of various alter egos. It is noted that majority of those plots are inter-connected & follow a particular nonlinear storyline throughout the body of their work. The "Dead Crow" symbolism goes hand in hand with their journey and has pretty much established itself as a mascot for Street Academics over time. The group's singles Vandi Puncture and Native Bapa, both released in 2012, are often held responsible for taking Malayalam hip-hop music to mainstream.

== Members ==
- Rjv Ernesto (Pakarcha Vyadhi) - Rapper, MC, lyricist, music producer, visual artist.
- Dr. Haris Saleem (Maapla) - Rapper, lyricist.
- Amjad Nadeem (Azuran) - Rapper, MC, lyricist, vocalist, music producer.
- Arjjun (Imbachi) - Rapper, MC, lyricist, vocalist, b-boy.
- Sai Giridhar - Filmmaker, editor, cinematographer.
- Shamnas Sha (Kalla Sha) - DJ, music producer.

Former Members:-

- Vivek Radhakrishnan (V3K) - Music producer, DJ, vocalist, rapper, record producer.
- Ruthin Thej - Music producer.
- Abhimanyu Raman (Earthgrime) - Rapper, lyricist, music producer.
- Pranav CH - Rapper, lyricist.
- Sandeep Thulasidas (Yestey) - Music producer, DJ, record producer.

== Discography ==
=== Albums:- ===
- 1. Aathmasphere EP (2013)
- 2. Chatha Kaakka EP (2016)
- 3. Loop (2019)

=== Remix Albums:- ===
- 1. Loop Flip (2020)
- 2. Kaliyug Remix (2020)

=== Film Soundtracks:- ===
- 1. Paisa Paisa - "Paisa Paisa" with Rahul Raj, Aby Salvin Thomas, Namitha Correya & Carl Frenies, Haris Saleem (2013)
- 2. Valiyaperunnal - "Uyirullavaram" with Rex Vijayan, Benny Dayal, Anwar Ali, Haris Saleem (2019)
- 3. Mariyam Vannu Vilakkoothi - "Thala Therichoru Aalkkoottam" with Wazim Ashraf, Murali Krishnan, Sandhoop Narayanan, Imbachi (2020)
- 4. Vichithram - "Paanje" with V3K, Azuran, Pakarcha Vyadhi (2022)
- 5. Adrishyam - "Akalekkodi" with Dawn Vincent, Pakarcha Vyadhi (2022)
- 6. Rifle Club - "Killer On The Loose" with Rex Vijayan, Imbachi (2024)
- 7. Meesha - "The Moustache" with Sooraj S. Kurup, Imbachi (2025)
- 8. Turbo - "Turbo Jose" with Sekhar Menon, Resmi Sateesh, Azuran, Imbachi, Pakarcha Vyadhi, Haris Saleem, ItsPC, Greesh (2025)
- 9. Vala: Story of a Bangle - "Sinners" with Govind Vasantha, Imbachi, Gabri (2025)

=== Singles:- ===
- 1. Rest In Peace (2011)
- 2. Vandi Puncture (2012)
- 3. Native Bapa ft. Mappila Lahala (2012)
- 4. Trapped In Rhymes (2013)
- 5. Aathmasphere (2013)
- 6. Angot Onnai (2013)
- 7. 16 Adiyanthiram (2015)
- 8. Funeral of a Native Son ft. Mappila Lahala (2016)
- 9. Chatha Kaakka (2016)
- 10. Space Station ft. Space Behind The Yellow Room (2017)
- 11. Kalapila (2017)
- 12. Aara? (2019)
- 13. Kolilakkam (2019)
- 14. Hara Hara (2019)
- 15. Pambaram (2020)
- 16. Pambaram - V3K Remix (2020)
- 17. Kalapila - V3K Remix (2020)
- 18. Kaliyug ft. Hrishi (2020)
- 19. Walayar (2021)
- 20. Pathiye (2021)
- 21. Coco [MFC Anthem] (2024)
- 21. Theepori (2026)

=== Collaboration Albums:- ===
- 1. Palakkadan Dystopia - Narakasabha (2015–2017)
- 2. Palakkadan Dystopia & Dead Author - Kaav (2020)
- 3. Palakkadan Dystopia & Dead Author - Marupiravi (2021–2022)
- 4. Palakkadan Dystopia - Vere Mari (2024)
- 5. Palakkadan Dystopia & Dead Author - Vasalpadi (2025)

=== Mixtapes/Solo Albums:- ===
- 1. Rjv Ernesto - Industrial Area (2003, 2006, 2008)
- 2. Maapla - Biohazard (2010)
- 3. Rjv Ernesto - Country Fellow: The Clairvoyant of Alter Egos (2012)
- 4. Rjv Ernesto & Earthgrime - Asylum of Philosophy: A Bottle of Paranoia (2012)
- 5. Earthgrime & Sez - Standalone Complex Vol 1: Paradox EP (2012)
- 6. Earthgrime & Sez - Geostatis EP (2012)
- 7. V3K - Psycle Edukk (2012)
- 8. Earthgrime - Street Lights In The Sun LP (2013)
- 9. V3K - The Gateway EP (2013)
- 10. Street Academics - Rest In Peace (2014)
- 11. Spank The Queen: The Death of Rjv Ernesto (2015)
- 12. Molten Wax: The Revenge of Rjv Ernesto (2016)
- 13. Shrapnels: The Autopsy of Rjv Ernesto (2016)
- 14. V3K - 240P: Third World Bass EP (2016)
- 15. Digging In The Wasteland: The Filth of Rjv Ernesto (2017)
- 16. V3K - 1010B & The Broken Laptop (2018)
- 17. Sex And Time Altering Nibs: The Hand of Rjv Ernesto (2018)
- 18. 25th Hour: The Miscarriages of Rjv Ernesto (2018)
- 19. V3K - Mojo (2019)
- 20. V3K - Minni (2020)
- 21. Blind Old Ape: The Tree of Rjv Ernesto (2022)
- 22. Mass Grave: The Womb of Rjv Ernesto (2022)
- 23. Imbachi - Lingo (2023)
- 24. Petroglyph: The Bird of Rjv Ernesto (2026)

== See also ==
- Indian hip-hop
- Malayalam hip-hop
- Gully rap
