= Operation Java =

2021 Indian film by Tharun Moorthy

- Theatrical release poster
- Directed by: Tharun Moorthy
- Written by: Tharun Moorthy
- Produced by: V Cinemas International
- Starring: Balu Varghese; Lukman Avaran; Binu Pappu; Irshad; Vinayakan; Shine Tom Chacko; Mamitha Baiju
- Cinematography: Faiz Siddik
- Edited by: Nishadh Yusuf
- Music by: Jakes Bejoy
- Production company: V Cinemas International
- Distributed by: Sree Priya Combines
- Release date: 12 February 2021
- Running time: 146 minutes
- Country: India
- Language: Malayalam

Operation Java is a 2021 Indian Malayalam-language crime thriller film produced by V Cinemas International, written and directed by Tharun Moorthy (in his feature film debut). It stars an ensemble cast including Balu Varghese, Lukman Avaran, Binu Pappu, Irshad, Shine Tom Chacko, Mamitha Baiju and Vinayakan. The story details an investigation undertaken by a cyber cell police station in Kochi. The film released on 12 February 2021 and received positive reviews from critics.

== Synopsis ==
The film is based on real-life cases and portrays investigations undertaken by a cyber cell police station in Kochi over the period of a year and half with the help of two unemployed engineering graduates. Cases involve film piracy, job fraud, and murder. Antony George and Vinay Dasan are the two skilled youths who are given temporary employment at the cyber cell and help the team solve cases using their skills. In the end, they are let go because the department cannot employ them anymore. The film explores the darker side of information technology and its users. The film also sheds light on the lakhs of unemployed youth in the country, their struggles and the life of temporary/ intern/ apprentice staff who work hard for relatively low wages.

== Cast ==
- Balu Varghese as Antony George
- Lukman Avaran as Vinaya Dasan
- Irshad as SI Prathapan, SHO - Cyber Cell, Kochi Unit
- Binu Pappu as ASI Joy Pulimoottil, Cyber Cell Kochi Unit
- Prasanth Alexander as Basheer, Senior CPO -Cyber Cell Kochi Unit
- Shine Tom Chacko as CI Jacob Mani
- Mamitha Baiju as Alphonsa
- Mathew Thomas as Jerry
- Sminu Sijo as Antony's mother
- Vinayakan as Ramanathan
- Dhanya Ananya as Janaki, Ramanathan's wife
- Johny Antony as Baburaj
- P. Balachandran as Balachandran
- Anju Mary Thomas as Anjali
- Unniraj as Akhileshettan
- Sarath Thenumoola as Vellayyan
- Vinitha Koshy as Shruthi
- Rithu Manthra as Kavitha David
- Dinesh Prabhakar as Johnny, Kavitha's husband
- Deepak Vijayan as Aneesh
- Jose Shipyard as Police Officer Peter
- Sanjay K Nair as Sanjay
- Vinod Bose as Ravi
- Parvathy
- Althaf Salim as Shanu
- Akhil as Dany
- Jaiz as Jaiz
- Sufi as Aravind
- Dilshana Dilshad as Maya (Ramanathan's daughter)
- Sanju as Sanju Techy
- Shiny Zara as Sanju Techy's mother
- Anil Kumar
- Jaise Jose
- Sunil Meleppuram
- Manikandan as Driver Baburaj
- Sreeja Ajith as Jerry's mother
- Eldho Raju
- Ramesh Chandran

== Production ==
Tharun Moorthy was a former assistant professor of Computer Science and Engineering in college Of Engineering Kidangoor who turned into an advertisement filmmaker. Operation Java is the feature film directorial debut of Moorthy who also wrote the screenplay. It was screenwriter John Paul Puthusery who invited Moorthy to make a feature film after seeing a short film he scripted. Director Moorthy described the film as an investigative thriller, and it's based on real-life cases that follows an investigation by a team over a period of a year-and-a-half. It takes place in 2015 - 2017 period. The film was produced by V Cinemas International

Principal photography took place at Kochi, Thiruvananthapuram, Vaikom, and Tamil Nadu. A location in Kakkanad served as the police station. Faiz Siddik was the cinematographer. Filming was wrapped in early March 2020. Dubbing of the film was held at a studio in Kochi in June 2020.

=== Home media ===
The satellite and post-theatrical streaming rights of the film were acquired by Zee Keralam and ZEE5, respectively. It premiered on both ZEE Keralam and ZEE5 on the same day on 15 May.

== Reception ==
Baradwaj Rangan of Film Companion South wrote "The film is a beautiful combination of romance and practicality and the cruelty of the establishment."

== Music ==
Operation Java

Soundtrack album by Jakes Bejoy
- Released: February 2021
- Genre: Film soundtrack
- Length: 8:45
- Language: Malayalam

Jakes Bejoy chronology
Durgamati (2020)	Operation Java (2021)	Chaavu Kaburu Challaga (2021)

The original soundtrack is composed, programmed, and arranged by Jakes Bejoy.

Track listing
No.	Title	Lyrics	Music	Singer(s)	Length
1.	"Iruvazhiye"	Joe Paul	Jakes Bejoy	Alan Joy Mathew, Parvatii Nair, Vivzy	4:41
2.	"Naade Naattaare"	Fejo, ThirumaLi	Jakes Bejoy	Fejo, ThirumaLi, Jakes Bejoy	4:04
Total length:					8:45

== Sequel ==
In October 2025, director Tharun Moorthy officially announced a sequel to Operation Java, titled Operation Cambodia, which will expand the OPJ universe.

The sequel will feature Prithviraj Sukumaran in a significant role, alongside returning cast members including Lukman Avaran, Balu Varghese, Binu Pappu, Prasanth Alexander, Irshad Ali, Deepak Vijay. Tharun Moorthy returns as director, with production handled by The Manifestation Studio, V Cinemas International, and Worldwide Films India. The project is planned to begin after Moorthy completes his film Torpedo.
