= Veena (album) =

Studio album by Heems
- Released: 23 August 2024
- Length: 33:35
- Labels: Veena Sounds; Mass Appeal India
- Producer: Sid Vashi

Heems chronology
Lafandar (2024)	Veena (2024)	A Hundred Alibis (2025)

Singles from Veena
- 1. "Manto" Released: 26 June 2024; 2. "Dame" Released: 17 July 2024; 3. "Rakhi" Released: 8 August 2024; 4. "Flowers" Released: 21 August 2024

Veena (also known as Veena LP) is the second solo studio album by American hip hop artist Heems, released on 23 August 2024 on record labels Veena Sounds and Mass Appeal India. It is Heems' second album of 2024, following the February release of Lafandar.

== Background and release ==
Veena was announced on 26 June 2024, the same day that lead single "Manto" featuring Vijay Iyer was released; the title of the single refers to the writer Saadat Hasan Manto. Several of Heems' family members appear in the music video for "Manto". Three further singles – "Dame", "Rakhi", and "Flowers" – followed in July and August.

Veena is named after both Heems' mother (who opens the album with a monologue) and the veena group of string instruments. Aside from the track "Rakhi", the album was produced by Sid Vashi, a psychiatrist from Melbourne.

== Critical reception ==
Professional ratings
Review scores
Source	Rating
Pitchfork	7.6/10
PopMatters	9/10

Luis Aguasvivas of PopMatters called Veena "an elegant, thrilling, and hilarious tightrope act" and "Heems' best record as a solo artist." He described lead single "Manto" as "a hip-hop origin story of the highest order," and Tim Fish of Wire called the track "arguably the most poignant ever heard from Heems."

== Track listing ==
No.	Title	Length
1.	"Veena"	2:26
2.	"Ratatouille"	2:16
3.	"Manto" (featuring Vijay Iyer)	4:39
4.	"Bourdain" (featuring Mr. Cheeks)	2:53
5.	"Underbelly"	1:52
6.	"Rakhi" (featuring Pavvan & Ajji)	4:03
7.	"Flowers" (featuring Navz-47)	4:48
8.	"Juhi"	1:10
9.	"Dame"	3:28
10.	"Banshee" (featuring Cool Calm Pete)	3:50
11.	"Righteous"	2:06
Total length:		33:35
