= Lafandar =

Studio album by Heems and Lapgan
- Released: February 16, 2024
- Length: 33:33
- Labels: Veena; Mass Appeal India
- Producer: Lapgan

Heems chronology
Eat Pray Thug (2015)	Lafandar (2024)	Veena (2024)

Lapgan chronology
History (2023)	Lafandar (2024)

Singles from Lafandar
- 1. "Accent" Released: January 23, 2024; 2. "Sri Lanka" Released: February 6, 2024

Lafandar is a collaborative studio album by American hip-hop artist Heems and Indian-American producer Gaurav Nagpal, also known as Lapgan. It was released on February 16, 2024, through Veena Sounds and Mass Appeal India.

== Background ==
Following a six-year break from music, Lafandar sees a return for the rapper under his newly found label Veena Sounds. The album is a collaboration project with Indian-American producer Lapgan, whose project History previously marked the first release on the label. The producer incorporated various "cinematic South Asian samples" on the record that are set to compliment Heems' trademark "laugh-out-loud wit".

Lafandar features guest appearances by Kool Keith, Open Mike Eagle, Quelle Chris, Your Old Droog, Saul Williams, Blu, Sid Sriram, and Sonnyjim. On January 23, 2024, the rapper announced the album alongside the release of the lead single "Accent" featuring Williams. On February 6, the rapper released the second single "Sri Lanka", a collaboration with Your Old Droog that sees them trading "punchlines".

== Critical reception ==
Pranav Trewn at Stereogum awarded Lafandar the accolade "album of the week", saying that the collaboration resulted in Heem's "most focused performance" since his Das Racist days. The rapper is not "sending up the genre" but brings "it back down to earth" and, as a result, delivers "the ideal" record he had been striving for "since 2008". Trewn sees Lafandar as "a landmark in the growing wave of Indo-Western hip-hop" as well as a "quintessential New York rap album". The editor also cites a broad soundscape with songs that "draw from across continents" as a work born from "requisite ambition", praising the production by Lapgan in particular.

== Track listing ==
Lafandar track listing
No.	Title	Writer(s)	Length
1.	"Stupid Dumb Illiterate" (with Sid Sriram)	Heems; Lapgan; Sid Sriram	2:18
2.	"I'm Pretty Cool"	Heems; Lapgan	2:22
3.	"Sri Lanka" (with Your Old Droog)	Heems; Lapgan; Your Old Droog	2:07
4.	"Accent" (with Saul Williams)	Heems; Lapgan; Saul Williams	2:29
5.	"Going for 6" (with Sonnyjim and Abhi the Nomad)	Heems; Lapgan; Sonnyjim; Abhi the Nomad	3:16
6.	"Bab Ganoush" (with Lee Scott and Cool Calm Pete)	Heems; Lapgan; Lee Scott; Cool Calm Pete	3:46
7.	"Obi Toppin (Darling)" (with Kool Keith)	Heems; Lapgan; Kool Keith	2:09
8.	"Kala Tika"	Heems; Lapgan	2:41
9.	"Yellow Chakra" (with Sir Michael Rocks and Open Mike Eagle)	Heems; Lapgan; Sir Michael Rocks; Open Mike Eagle	3:02
10.	"Porches" (with Blu and Quelle Chris)	Heems; LapganBlu; Quelle Chris	3:07
11.	"Bukayo Saka"	Heems; Lapgan	2:36
12.	"Your Momma" (with Fatboi Sharif)	Heems; Lapgan; Fatboi Sharif	3:40
Total length:			33:33

== Personnel ==
- Heems – vocals
- Lapgan – production, programming
- Ryan Rajagopal – mastering
- Daniel Lynas – mixing
