= Naradan =

2022 film by Aashiq Abu

- Theatrical release poster
- Directed by: Aashiq Abu
- Written by: Unni R.
- Produced by: Santhosh T. Kuruvilla; Rima Kallingal; Aashiq Abu
- Starring: Tovino Thomas; Anna Ben
- Cinematography: Jaffer Zadique
- Edited by: Saiju Sreedharan
- Music by: Yakzan Gary Pereira; Neha Nair
- Production company: OPM Cinemas
- Distributed by: OPM Cinemas
- Release date: 3 March 2022
- Running time: 149 minutes
- Country: India
- Language: Malayalam

Naradan is a 2022 Indian Malayalam-language neo-noir crime thriller film directed by Aashiq Abu. The film stars Tovino Thomas, Anna Ben and Sharafudheen in lead roles.

The film was originally scheduled to be released in April 2021, but was postponed due to the second wave of the COVID-19 pandemic in India. After multiple postponements, the film was theatrically released on 3 March 2022 along with Bheeshma Parvam.

== Plot ==
Chandraprakash, an upcoming journalist working with the channel News Malayalam, is a talk show host and television news anchor with a huge audience appeal. Chandraprakash is under pressure for doing stories that increase the channel's rating from his editor and bosses. When a fellow journalist, Pradeep does a new story and lands a job at News Malayalam, Chandraprakash keeps aside his own moral principles and focuses on being number one. Chandraprakash meets a politician, Babuji, who offers him a chance to start a new channel, Narada News. Investors seeking new revenue streams invest in Chandraprakash. He becomes a kingmaker through Narada, an influential person who is able to provoke social violence. Chandraprakash uses his strategy of fabricated and half-baked stories to meet his ends, beginning the channel with a sting operation on the Minister of Forests, Thomman Varghese. However, things change when a social media celebrity Mudiyan asks some questions to Chandraprakash in a lift, after which he posts the video on social media which led to many trolls. Chandraprakash fabricates a narcotic report against Mudiyan. Since he is innocent, Adv. Shaakira Mohammed meets him and decides to fight against Chandraprakash. Shaakira reveals all the illegal activities Chandraprakash has done to increase TRP in front of the court, which leads to Chandraprakash being arrested and sent to prison.

== Cast ==
- Tovino Thomas as Chandraprakash
- Anna Ben as Adv. Shaakira Mohammed
- Sharafudheen as Pradeep John
- Joy Mathew as Shivadas Kurup, Chief Editor of News Malayalam
- Vijayaraghavan as Babuji
- Balachandran Chullikkad as Vijayan, Pradeep's boss at Vartha 24x7
- Raghunath Paleri as Mohammed Khan, Shaakira's father
- Jayaraj Warrier as Bharathan, CP's father
- Rafi as Pillachettan
- Kunchan as Gurudasan, Minister of Forests
- Dileesh Nair as Kuttettan
- Rajesh Madhavan as Manu
- Indrans as Judge Chothi
- Jaffer Idukki as Fr. Clement Purambokkil (Purambokkil Achan)
- Renji Panicker as Adv. Govinda Menon
- Lukman Avaran as Adv. Ameer
- Vijaykumar Prabhakaran as Mukundan
- Koottickal Jayachandran as MLA Kanjikkaadan
- Navas Vallikkunnu as Nizar
- Fejo as Mudiyan
- Nazlin Saleem as Parvathy

== Music ==
=== Songs ===
The soundtrack features songs composed by Sekhar Menon. The Song Thannatthaan was Co-composed by Fejo and Manchild. Rex Vijayan played guitar for Thannatthan.

Naradan

Soundtrack album by Sekhar Menon
- Released: 28 February 2022
- Recorded: 2020–2022
- Genre: Feature film soundtrack
- Length: 6:17
- Language: Malayalam
- Label: OPM Records
- Producer: Sekhar Menon

Sekhar Menon chronology
Kozhi Punk (2020)	Naradan (2022)	03:00 AM (2022)

Naradan
No.	Title	Lyrics	Artist(s)	Length
1.	"Neeyetha"	MC Couper, Marthyan	MC Couper, Marthyan	2:59
2.	"Thannatthan"	Fejo, Manchild	Fejo	3:18
Total length:				06:17

=== Original soundtrack ===
The original soundtrack is composed and produced by Yakzan Gary Pereira and Neha Nair.

Naradan

Film score by Yakzan Gary Pereira and Neha Nair
- Released: 3 March 2022
- Recorded: 2020–2022
- Genre: Film Score
- Length: 20:29
- Language: Malayalam
- Label: OPM Records
- Producers: Yakzan Gary Pereira and Neha Nair

Yakzan Gary Pereira and Neha Nair chronology
Sumesh and Ramesh (2021)	Naradan (2022)	Vaashi (2022)
External audio
- Original Soundtrack on YouTube

Naradan (Original Motion Picture Soundtrack)
No.	Title	Length
1.	"Birth Of CP"	02:39
2.	"Call Me CP"	02:05
3.	"Countdown To Naradha"	00:51
4.	"Blackmailing The Minister"	02:42
5.	"I Know Where You live"	01:08
6.	"Shakira's Journey"	02:25
7.	"Dethroning CP"	03:27
8.	"The Magistrate"	01:25
9.	"The Power Of Justice"	03:45
Total length:		20:29

== Production ==
The film was announced in October 2020. Principal photography began on 25 January 2021. The film's shoot was wrapped up on 12 March 2021.

== Release ==
The film was originally scheduled to be released in April 2021, but was postponed due to the second wave of COVID-19 pandemic in India. The film was later scheduled to release on 27 January 2022, but then postponed due to spreading of Omicron. The film was then released on 3 March 2022 along with Mammootty starrer Bheeshma Parvam.

== Reception ==
Naaradan received generally positive reviews from critics and audience. The Times of India gave 3.5/5 and wrote "A closer look at TRP chasing newsrooms". Firstpost gave 3.5/5 and wrote "Tovino Thomas, Anna Ben land a slap on the face of India's fake-news-peddling media". The News Minute gave 3.5/5 and wrote "Tovino-Aashiq Abu film shows reality of new age journalism". Indian Express gave 3.5/5 and wrote "Tovino-Aashiq Abu film shows reality of new age journalism". Pinkvilla gave 3/5 and wrote "Tovino Thomas shines on screen as a news reporter in this thrilling story". Ottplay gave 3/5 and wrote "Tovino Thomas' anti-hero act makes Aashiq Abu's slow-burning thriller gripping".
