= Titans (film) =

2026 Indian Malayalam language film

- Theatrical release poster
- Directed by: Prince Joy
- Written by: James Sebastian
- Produced by: Midhun Manuel Thomas; Irshad M. Hassan; Pradeep C.S.
- Starring: Jayasurya; Vinayakan; Nihal Nizam; Baby Jean
- Cinematography: Vishnu Sharma
- Edited by: Shameer Muhammed
- Music by: Dawn Vincent
- Production companies: Nerampokku; Manuel Movie Makers; Avanir Tech; Babu Ettan Films
- Distributed by: Magic Frames (Kerala); Fars Films (Overseas)
- Release date: 22 October 2026
- Running time: 125 minutes
- Country: India
- Language: Malayalam

Titans is a 2026 Indian Malayalam-language fantasy comedy drama film directed by Prince Joy and starring Jayasurya and Vinayakan in the lead roles. The film released in theatres on 22 October 2026.

The film received mostly mixed-to-negative reviews with praise received for standout performances (particularly Vinayakan and Nihal Nizam) the wild concept, and background score. The film did receive criticism for its weak writing and action sequences.

== Plot ==
Set in Fort Kochi, the film tells the story of Antony Yakuza, a prominent member of Paili's gang. After Paili's death, his son Peter also known as Kuttappi takes control of the gang and Antony is largely marginalized as he repeatedly fails at the jobs he takes on.

Determined to reclaim his position and reputation, Antony sets out on a major operation with Anwar. They are joined by Regimon, a driver who works as an assistant to the mysterious Managing Director, Anand Ji. As the operation progresses, Regimon's own secret agenda complicates their plans.

== Cast ==
- Jayasurya as Antony Yakuza
- Vinayakan as Rejimon / AUT 44422 (Angel under training)
- Nihal Nizam as Anwar
- Baby Jean as Peter
- Adam Sabiq as Robert
- Suresh Krishna as CI Vyasan
- Indrans as Anand G / God
- Sunny Wayne as Lucifer
- Manikandan as Sebastian
- Al Ameen as Ferno
- Joy Mathew as Pylie (Photo presence)

== Development ==
The film written by James Sebastian and directed by Prince Joy is being produced by Midhun Manuel Thomas and Irshad M. Hassan under the banners of Nerampokku, Manuel Movie Makers, and Avanir Tech, along with Pradeep C.S. under the banner of Babu Ettan Films. Vishnu Sharma handled the cinematography, Shameer Muhammed the editing, and Don Vincent composed the songs and background score.

The film was shot in Kochi, Coimbatore, and Kollam.

The film is distributed in Kerala by Magic Frames and the overseas distribution is handled by Fars Films. 123 Musics has acquired the audio and music rights of the film.

== Release ==
The film has received a U/A 16+ certificate from the censor board. The film released in theatres on 22 October 2026.

== Reception ==
Giving it a rating of one out of five, Ananthu Suresh of The Indian Express writes that the film Titans turns into a tiresome and uninteresting disaster, due to a weak screenplay, failed jokes, and poorly executed action sequences Malayala Manorama's R. B. Sheelekha praised the film, calling it a good entertainer that will appeal to all sections of the viewers with its making style and different theme. However, she writes that it is a bit doubtful whether some of the characters introduced in references to Hollywood superhero films were able to interact with the viewers as deeply as intended.

Salma Sulthana, writing for Mathrubhumi English, gave the film a rating of three out of five, praising the performances of the lead actors, the humor in the first half, and the fantasy elements of the film. However, she noted that the pace of the film slows down in the second half. Arun Madhusoothanan writes for the Malayalam edition of Mathrubhumi that the film, which blends comedy, fantasy, and thriller, is a 'feel-better' fantasy entertainer that can be experienced in the theater without any pressure.
