= Tharun Moorthy =

Indian film director and screenwriter

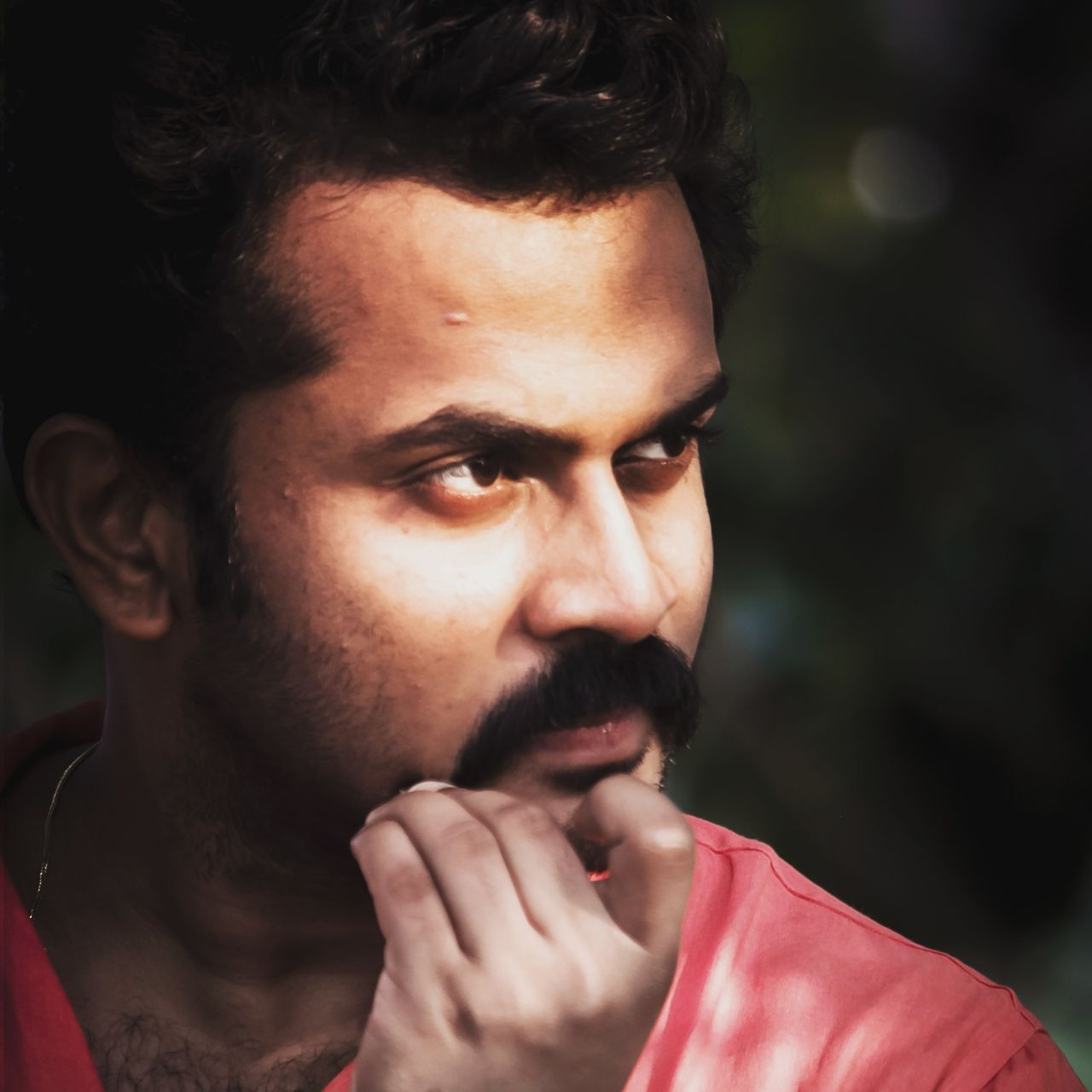
- Born: Vaikom, Kerala, India
- Education: College of Engineering, Cherthala
- Occupations: Director; screenwriter
- Years active: 2021–present
- Spouse: Revathy Roy
- Parents: Madhu D; Vinu NP

Tharun Moorthy is an Indian film director and screenwriter who predominantly works in Malayalam Cinema, with his first film being Operation Java. His second film, Saudi Vellakka, was chosen for the Indian Panorama at IFFI 2022.

== Career ==
Early in his career, Moorthy was a part of the performing arts industry, acting in theatre and in kathakali productions since a young age. He went on to become an assistant professor in the field of computer science engineering and also had a period where he made advertisements for television. From the latter, he learned how to create studio sets and how media production is done, which led to him becoming a "self-taught" director after failing to land any major roles as an actor. He stated that his father was the first to notice and push him into writing scripts for films.

=== Operation Java ===
Moorthy's first film, Operation Java, was released in the middle of the COVID-19 pandemic, when film revenue was reduced across the entire industry. The film was a success despite this, resulting in Moorthy releasing a new film poster with the tagline "Those who don't want to lose". His selection of Lukman Avaran to be his lead actor after seeing his performance as the secondary best friend character in Thallumaala was initially negatively commented on by others in the film industry, with similar people claiming that Moorthy's "arrogance" is what led him to pick the same actor for his second film. He replied that it was not arrogance but "my pride" that led him to purposefully pick actors that are not already big names in the industry to help them progress as actors, since to him cinema is "not just business for us, it's also art". Consequently, all 83 characters in the film were hand-picked by Moorthy, and his production crew and avoided doing an open audition. He also had the film open with an apology note to all the actors who were ultimately rejected or whose scenes were reduced during production.

The film itself was originally decided by Moorthy after seeing the situation involving the leak of the film Premam and the real investigation case that was solved by two younger men. Because of this source, the names of the young men were kept the same in Operation Java after receiving permission from the individuals. To prepare for the film, he spent a lot of time alongside the cybercrime division of the police to see how the cases were dealt with.

=== Saudi Vellakka ===
After the success of his first film, Moorthy began work on a second film titled Saudi Vellakka that was meant to address the "nature of hate" and how the spread of hatred between people can alter how one thinks of another person, with Moorthy stating that the main characters central issue is "common to many families". He first conceived of the film after seeing a newspaper clipping about the real life case the film is based on. To be able to better depict court proceedings, but also to alter them to be more humorous and cinematic, Moorthy and the production team spent several weeks attending various court sessions. He had difficulty, however, in obtaining a release date for the film as the lack of popular well-known actors in the production inhibited the potential audience size. Moorthy stated that his method of filmmaking involves deciding on the characters and what their faces look like, then leaving finding the corresponding actors to the casting director. Because of this, 50 of the actors in the movie are new to film, with several coming from theatre careers.

Saudi Vellakka was chosen to be screened at the 2022 International Film Festival of India (IFFI) for the Indian Panorama section and was nominated for the IFFI ICFT UNESCO Gandhi Medal. Moorthy's second film was officially released in theaters on 2 December 2022 to critical acclaim, with Indian film people such as actress Manju Warrier and director AR Murugadoss highly praising the film, and was further released on OTT services on 2 January 2023. Despite positive critical reviews and opening at the top of the box office, the film had a slow accumulation of revenue, earning just ₹87 lakhs (approximately $107,000) in its first three days.

Moorthy attributed his successes to the supporters that helped him make his films in the manner and style he desired, particularly for Saudi Vellakka. After his first film's success, many people in the film industry were pushing him to next do a "superstar" level film, but it was his producers that allowed him to instead do the type of important message stories that he cared about. He noted that while his primary goal as a filmmaker is to "entertain the audience", he hoped to also give his viewers "food for thought" about meaningful issues affecting contemporary society, such as cybercrime for Operation Java and the massive backlog of pending court cases for Saudi Vellakka.

== Filmography ==
Year	Title	Director	Writer	Notes	Ref.
2021	Operation Java	Yes	Yes		
2022	Saudi Vellakka	Yes	Yes		
2025	Thudarum	Yes	Yes		
2026	Athimanoharam †	Yes	Yes		
TBA	Torpedo †	Yes	No		
TBA	Operation Cambodia †	Yes	Yes	Sequel to Operation Java	
