= No Way Out (2022 film) =

- Directed by: Nithin Devadas
- Written by: Nithin Devadas
- Produced by: Remosh M. S.
- Starring: Ramesh Pisharody; Dharmajan Bolgatty; Basil Joseph; Raveena Nair
- Cinematography: Varghese David
- Edited by: K. R. Midhun
- Music by: K. R. Rahul
- Production company: Chalachithram Film Studio
- Distributed by: Goodwill Entertainments
- Release date: 22 April 2022
- Running time: 97 minutes
- Country: India
- Language: Malayalam

No Way Out is a 2022 Indian Malayalam film written and directed by Nithin Devadas featuring Ramesh Pisharody, Dharmajan Bolgatty, Basil Joseph.

== Plot ==
After investing Rs 1 crore in a business before the pandemic lockdown, David is neck deep in debts and under immense pressure. As his final hope fades, he decided to end his life. But does fate another trick up its sleeve?

== Cast ==
- Ramesh Pisharody
- Dharmajan Bolgatty
- Basil Joseph
- Raveena Nair

== Soundtrack ==
No Way Out

Soundtrack album by K. R. Rahul
- Released: April 2022
- Genre: Feature film soundtrack
- Length: 11m 12s

| No. | Title | Singers | Length |
|---|---|---|---|
| 1. | "Maranathin Niram" | Vedan | 2:12 |
| 2. | "Nira Ravil" | K. S. Chithra | 4:26 |
| 3. | "Wo Aasman" | Nakul Abhyankar | 4:34 |
| Total length: | | | 11:12 |
