= Bharathanatyam 2 Mohiniyattam =

2026 Indian Malayalam-language film

- Theatrical release poster
- Directed by: Krishnadas Murali
- Written by: Krishnadas Murali; Vishnu R. Pradeep
- Produced by: Lini Mariam David; Anupama B. Nambiar
- Starring: Saiju Kurup; Suraj Venjaramoodu; Jagadish; Vinay Forrt; Baby Jean
- Cinematography: Bablu Aju
- Edited by: Shafeeque V. B.
- Music by: Electronic Kili
- Production companies: Thomas Thiruvalla Films; Saiju Kurup Entertainments
- Release date: 10 April 2026
- Running time: 155 minutes
- Country: India
- Language: Malayalam
- Budget: ₹5–6 crore
- Box office: est. ₹52 crore

Bharathanatyam 2 Mohiniyattam is a 2026 Indian Malayalam-language dark comedy parody crime drama directed by Krishnadas Murali and co-written by Murali and Vishnu R. Pradeep. A sequel to Bharathanatyam (2024), it was produced by Thomas Thiruvalla Films and Saiju Kurup Entertainments. The film stars Saiju Kurup, Suraj Venjaramoodu, Jagadish, Baby Jean, Vinay Forrt, Kalaranjini and Sreeja Ravi. The film continues the story of Sasidharan Nair and his extended family.

It was released theatrically on 10 April 2026 as a Vishu release. It received critical acclaim for the effective potrayal of dark humour. The film was a commercial success and emerged as the sixth highest grossing Malayalam film of 2026.

== Plot ==
The film begins after the death of Bharathan Nair. Sasi along with his family travels to Sreekandapuram to the new house of Rukmini and Ajay. They stay for a few days and meet with their neighbours, including Subhash. They visit the local temple, and pray there, though the local people stare at Saraswati.

Govindan, a friend of Bharathan Nair, as well as the uncle of Subhash, comes to meet them and reveals that the temple and the deity were created with a fake story by Bharathan Nair. Now someone has understood the truth and is threatening to go public with it, unless he is paid around Rs 1.5 crores. The local temple committee has found some of it, but are short of Rs 75 lakhs. He asks Bharathan Nair's family to pay the money or to put the complete blame on Bharathan Nair, saying since he is dead, the others can avoid jail, and gives them two days time to make a decision.

Sasi asks his mother the name of their grandmother and Bharathan Nair's mother, which she says was Mohineeshwari. Sasi goes to the temple and finds that the deity's name is Mohineeshwari Devi. He also finds plaques in the temple with his family's names, and finds that the image of the deity is created from a picture of his mother, Saraswati. Convinced now that Govindan was telling the truth, he tries to stall for time, but Govindan arrives promptly on the second day. He soon figures out that Bharathan Nair has two families and tries to go public to extort more money. To hide him, they cover him with a cloth and hold onto him, but in the process, Saraswati accidentally twists his neck, which kills him.

Subhash who had seen that his uncle was going to Sasi's house, is told by Sasi that his uncle never arrived, though he doesn't believe it. The family, meanwhile tries to dispose off the body, but it is foiled by Subhash each time. Subhash, now convinced that the family is hiding something, starts to keep a closer eye on them. It is also revealed that the temple committee had cheated Bharathan Nair of around Rs 30 lakhs sometime previously, due to which Rukmini had lost her previous house.

To save themselves as well as handle Subhash, Sasi calls the Temple Committee Member Subhash from his hometown. To avoid confusion, they call him Subhash Sr and their neighbour, Subhash Jr. Subhash Jr starts putting out missing posters of his uncle. Subhash Sr suggests a way for the family to get themselves out of this situation by placing the dead body in Subhash Jr's house, to his shock. Subhash Jr later hears from his aunt that Govindan was planning to cheat him as well by robbing him of money. The local temple committee also realise that Govindan was cheating them when the person who was threatening them asks only for a smaller amount. Subhash Jr soon realises who put the body in his house and goes to speak with Sasi and his family. They both realise the only way out of this situation is together and they reach a compromise.

They decide to take the help of Eapen, a local butcher holding a grudge against Govindan. They go to Subhash's house, cut the body into various "kits", dispose off the clothes and slippers, and try to abandon the bags in different places; however, Ajay realizes that one of his kit is missing and informs Arun. Meanwhile, CI Parthan, who gets the missing poster, catches Subhash Jr near the river and follows him to his house. Ajay who was with Subhash Jr, warns everyone and they escape Subhash Jr's house just in time. Govindan's dog Simba who had left home after Govindan went missing, follows them and starts barking near Sasi's house. The CI gets doubtful and searches Sasi's house as well.

The family frantically search for the missing bag, with the doubtful CI watching over them. Arun discreetly reveals to the family that he put the contents of the missing bag inside the pressure cooker gifted by Govindan which is on the gas stove. Sasi now tells the CI that Govindan had discovered his father's two marriages and puts the complete blame on Govindan for creating the fake temple. The local committee also puts the blame on Govindan for stealing money from them. The CI comes to the conclusion that Govindan cheated everyone and escaped with the money.

A few days later, the family is performing the last rites of Bharathan Nair. After the rites, Sasi gives Gopan a bag containing around Rs 30 lakhs, needed for his new job. It is revealed that the extra amount Govindan stole from the temple committee was kept in the temple's donation box and that Sasi and Subhash Jr had broken it a few days ago and split the money. He also reveals that he burnt the contents of the cooker and that ash was mixed with that of Bharathan Nair, which he just sent down the river. The film ends with the shocked faces of the family.

== Cast ==
- Saiju Kurup as Sasidharan "Sasi" Nair
- Suraj Venjaramoodu as Govindaraja "Govindan"
- Baby Jean as Subhash (Jr), Govindan's nephew
- Vinay Forrt as CI Parthan
- Jagadish as Eapen
- Vijay Babu as Mohandas
- Abhiram Radhakrishnan as Subhash (Sr), Sasi's friend
- Kalaranjini as Saraswathi, Sasi's mother
- Sreeja Ravi as Rukmini
- Sai Kumar as Bharathan Nair (Flashback from part 1)
- Santhosh K. Nayar as Raghunandan, Temple committee member
- Balachandran Chullikkad as Sathyan, Temple committee member
- Nisthar Sait as Baby, Temple committee member
- Divya M. Nair as Santhi
- Sruthy Suresh as Sreelatha
- Nandu Poduval as Ashokan
- Jinil Rex as Arun Ghosh Bharathan
- Jivin Rex as Ajay Ghosh Bharathan
- Swathidas Prabhu as Gopakumar "Gopan"
- Sreerekha Rajagopal as Soja, Govindan's wife
- Salim Hassan as Adv. Henry Samuel
- Jis Joy as Lord Sree Rama (Voice Appearance)

== Production ==
=== Development ===
Following the reception of Bharathanatyam on streaming platforms after its theatrical run, a sequel titled Mohiniyattam was announced in 2025. Krishnadas Murali returned as director, while Saiju Kurup also returned as the lead actor from the first film.

The film was formally launched in November 2025 with a pooja ceremony. Reports noted that the sequel would continue from the point where the earlier film ended, with members of the original cast reprising their roles and several new actors joining the franchise.

=== Filming ===
Principal photography began in November 2025 and wrapped in January 2026. Bablu Aju handled the cinematography, while the film was edited by Shafeeque VB.

== Music ==
Bharathanatyam 2 Mohiniyattam

Soundtrack album by Electronic Kili
- Released: April 2026
- Genre: Filmi
- Label: Think Music

The film's music was composed by Electronic Kili. The first single, "Nilavoonjale", was released in March 2026. The song was written by Muthu and sung by Sublahshini.

=== Track Listing ===
No.	Title	Lyrics	Singer(s)	Length
1.	"Nilavoonjaale"	Muthu	Sublahshi	2:55
2.	"Damn Deem"	Lillys Thaddeus	Vishnudath Satheesh, Vishnudath Santhosh, Lillys Thaddeus	3:27

== Release ==
The film was released in theatres on 10 April 2026, coinciding with the Vishu season. The film's runtime was reported as 155 minutes in theatrical listings.

=== Home Media ===
The digital streaming rights of the film is acquired by Netflix and started streaming from 8 May 2026.

== Reception ==
Critical reception was positive. Reviewing the film for The Indian Express, Anandu Suresh described it as "a worthy sequel" and praised its fresh treatment within an established franchise framework. Cinema Express called it "a bolder, funnier sequel" that moved the franchise into darker territory with a stronger ensemble. In The Hindu, the film was noted for its "rationalist bent" within its dark-comedy approach.

Manorama Online described the film as one of the stronger recent dark-comedy entertainers in Malayalam cinema, while Indian Express Malayalam highlighted its shift from the first film's family-comedy tone into a darker comic register.

== Sequel ==
In June 2026, the third installment of the franchise was announced as Bharathanatyam 3 Rasaleela.
