= Sony Music India =

Indian music record label

Sony Music Entertainment India Pvt. Ltd.
- Type: Subsidiary
- Industry: Music
- Genre: Various
- Founded: 1997; 29 years ago
- Headquarters: Mumbai, Maharashtra, India
- Key people: Shridhar Subramaniam – President; Vinit Thakkar – Managing Director
- Services: Music record label
- Parent: Sony Music Entertainment
- Subsidiaries: Sony Music South

YouTube information
- Channels: Sony Music India; Sony Music South
- Years active: 2009–present
- Genres: Music videos; Film trailers
- Subscribers: 72.9 million (main channel); 94 million (combined) (Note: Subscribers, broken down by channel: 72.9 million (Sony Music India); 21.7 million (Sony Music South))
- Views: 85.5 billion (main channel); 108 billion (combined) (Note: Views, broken down by channel: 85.5 billion (Sony Music India); 22.5 billion (Sony Music South))
- Last updated: September 15, 2026

Sony Music India is an Indian music record label operated by Sony and headquartered in Mumbai, Maharashtra. The company began operations in 1997 and was the first record company in India to be fully foreign-owned, with Sony being a Japanese corporation. From December 2013 to March 2020, the company distributed Warner Music Group releases in India and the SAARC region, until the launch of the Warner Music India division. Sony Music India is the largest foreign-owned music label in the country and the second-largest overall. It holds a 25% share of the Indian music market, ranking behind T-Series and ahead of Zee Music Company, with which it has a strategic partnership.

== Labels ==
=== Sub Label ===
- Sony Music South is a division of Sony Music India that focuses on film soundtracks and independent pop songs from South India. The label is based in Chennai, Tamil Nadu.
- Sony Music India Pop is a division of Sony Music India that focuses on independent pop songs all around the India by absorbing labels Brown, Nine. It also includes pop songs Under Sony Music Which Distributed at past.

Labels acquired or distributed by Sony Music India
Label
CBS India (Columbia Records India)
CBS Pan Music
Magnasound Records
BMG Crescendo – acquired following the Sony BMG joint venture
Eros Now Music
Navras Records (Formerly distributed in Label Sony Nād by becoming under exclusive licence. Now Under Distributive licence)
Think Music [1996–2010]; (excluding Lesa Lesa (2003), Aethirree (2004), Enthiran (2010), Uthamaputhiran (2010))
Satyam Audios
Johny Sagariga Music Company
Sony 550 Music India
Epic Records India
Echo Recording Co. Pvt. Ltd.
Vishesh Films
Brown
Nine
Mayur Cassettes LLP

Labels Under Exclusive License To Sony Music India
Label
Salman Khan Films Music

=== Brotherhood Label By Sony Music India For Artists & Label Service ===
The Orchard India is a subsidiary of Sony Music India, which launched on 2013 in India for Artists & Label Service

== Hindi Film Soundtracks ==
Year	Movie(s)
1980s
1983	Sadma
1983	Kalakaar
1983	Agar Tum Na Hote
1983	Baazi
1983	Boxer
1983	Ab Ayega Mazaa
1983	Pighalta Aasman
1984	Purana Mandir
1984	Zameen Aasmaan
1984	Utsav
1984	Inquilaab
1984	Andar Baahar
1984	Sunny
1985	Haveli
1985	Zamana
1990s
1991	Meena Bazaar
1991	Jungle Queen
1991	Dalapathi (Hindi Version)
1991	Swarg Jaisaa Ghar
1992	Roja (Hindi Version)
1992	Divya Shakti
1992	Dilwale Kabhi Na Hare
1993	Rudaali
1993	Maya Memsaab
1994	Anokha Prem Yudh
1994	Kabhi Haan Kabhi Naa
1996	Maachis
1997	Ishq
1998	Kuch Kuch Hota Hai
1998	Pyaar To Hona Hi Tha
1999	Pyaar Mein Kabhi Kabhi
1999	Dil Kya Kare
1999	Rockford
1999	Bhopal Express
2000s
2000	Phir Bhi Dil Hai Hindustani
2000	Ghaath
2000	Raju Chacha
2001	Zubeidaa
2001	Lagaan
2001	Asoka
2001	Kabhi Khushi Kabhie Gham
2002	Gunaah
2002	Kehtaa Hai Dil Baar Baar
2002	Dum
2002	Chura Liyaa Hai Tumne
2002	Kyaa Dil Ne Kahaa
2002	Annarth
2002	Khwahish
2003	Kal Ho Naa Ho
2003	Jhankaar Beats
2003	Boom
2003	Ishq Hai Tumse
2003	Mumbai Se Aaya Mera Dost
2003	Aetbaar
2004	Lakshya
2004	Aitraaz
2004	Meenaxi: A Tale of Three Cities
2004	Gumnaam - The Mystery
2004	Murder
2004	Uuf Kya Jaadoo Mohabbat Hai
2004	Popcorn Khao! Mast Ho Jao
2005	Kaal
2005	The Blue Umbrella
2006	I See You
2006	Kabhi Alvida Naa Kehna
2006	Omkara
2006	Rang De Basanti
2007	Guru
2007	Life in a... Metro
2007	Namastey London
2007	Awarapan
2007	Saawariya
2008	Aamir
2008	Dil Kabaddi
2008	Dostana
2008	Jannat
2008	Jodhaa Akbar
2008	Kidnap
2009	Aa Dekhen Zara
2009	Aagey Se Right
2009	Aladin
2009	Kambakkht Ishq
2009	Kurbaan
2009	Love Aaj Kal
2009	Quick Gun Murugun
2009	Raaz – The Mystery Continues
2009	Tum Mile
2009	Wake Up Sid
2009	What's Your Raashee?
2010s
2010	Sivaji: The Boss (Hindi Dubbed version)
2010	Aisha
2010	Crook
2010	I Am
2010	I Hate Luv Storys
2010	Isi Life Mein
2010	Love Sex aur Dhokha
2010	No Problem
2010	Raajneeti
2010	Veer
2010	We Are Family
2011	Aarakshan
2011	Chalo Dilli
2011	Faltu
2011	I Am Singh
2011	Love Anthem For World Peace and Love
2011	Love U...Mr. Kalakaar!
2011	Mere Brother Ki Dulhan
2011	Mujhse Fraaandship Karoge
2011	Shor in the City
2011	Teen Thay Bhai
2012	Agneepath
2012	Ajab Gazabb Love
2012	Barfi!
2012	Blood Money
2012	Chakravyuh
2012	Ekk Deewana Tha
2012	Jannat 2
2012	Joker
2012	Rowdy Rathore
2012	Student of the Year
2013	3G
2013	Bhaag Milkha Bhaag
2013	Gori Tere Pyaar Mein
2013	Matru Ki Bijlee Ka Mandola
2013	Murder 3
2013	Raanjhanaa
2013	Rangrezz
2014	Hasee Toh Phasee
2014	Humpty Sharma Ki Dulhania
2014	Finding Fanny
2014	Ungli
2014	Zid
2015	Dilwale
2015	Mr. X
2015	Brothers
2015	Hamari Adhuri Kahani
2015	Bezubaan Ishq
2016	Kapoor & Sons
2016	Ae Dil Hai Mushkil
2016	Dear Zindagi
2017	Ok Jaanu
2017	Tubelight
2017	Jab Harry Met Sejal
2017	The Sound Story
2018	Welcome to New York
2018	Dil Juunglee
2018	Soorma
2018	Mitron
2018	Jalebi
2018	Namaste England
2019	Petta (Dubbed version)
2019	Mere Pyare Prime Minister
2019	Bala
2019	Made In China
2019	Yeh Saali Aashiqui
2020s
2020	Love Aaj Kal
2020	Dil Bechara
2020	Sadak 2
2020	Ginny Weds Sunny
2021	Vijay the Master (Dubbed version)
2021	Roohi
2021	99 Songs
2021	Mimi
2021	Shershaah
2022	Gehraiyaan
2022	Nikamma
2022	Titu Ambani
2022	Liger
2022	Brahmāstra: Part One – Shiva
2022	Govinda Naam Mera
2022	Qala
2023	The Archies
2023	Farzi
2023	Zwigato
2024	Mr And Mrs Mahi
2024	Kill
2025	Chhaava
2025	Sunny Sanskari Ki Tulsi Kumari
2026	Ikkis
2026	Chand Mera Dil
2026	Awarapan 2
2026	Drishyam: The Conclusion

== Pop Music (Hindi) ==
Year	Album & Single Title	Artist(s)
1990s
1997	Dance Masti	Instant Karma
1997	Duniya	Raageshwari
1997	Jogi - The Ultimate Remix Album	Anaida, Mehnaz, Piyush Soni
1997	Vande Mataram	A.R. Rahman
1998	Deewane To Deewane Hai	Shweta Shetty
1998	Kismat	Sonu Nigam
1998	Na Jaane	Nitin Bali
1998	Sawan Mein Lag Gayi Aag	Mika Singh
1998	Lolipop	Bina Mistry
1998	Maa	Sagarika
1998	Sifar	Lucky Ali
1998	The Way We Do It	Colonial Cousins
1998	Tunak Tunak Tun	Daler Mehndi
1999	Chori Chori	Anaida
1999	Pal	Krishna Kumar Kunnath
1999	Mausam	Mehnaz Hoosein
1999	Mausam	Sonu Nigam
1999	Return of Dance Masti	Instant Karma
2000s
2000	Kaisa Yeh Jadoo	Bela Shende
2000	Gulzar’s Sunset Point	Vishal
2000	Aks	Lucky Ali
2000	Piya Basanti	K.S. Chithra and Ustad Sultan Khan
2001	Mukhda Piya Ka	Rajeshwari
2001	Meri Jaan	Vasundhara Das
2001	Tum Aaye	Hariharan, Alka Yagnik
2001	Mere Liye	Vocalist(s): Sagarika, Shaan, Zubeen Garg; Backing Vocalist(s): Suchitra Pillai
2002	Mahalakshmi	Mahalakshmi Iyer
2002	Dance Masti Again	Instant Karma
2002	Yeh Bhi Woh Bhi	A Band of Boys
2003	Chalo India	Various
2003	Dhaani	Strings
2004	Jeet Lo Dil	Strings and Euphoria
2005	Aapka... Abhijeet Sawant	Abhijeet Sawant
2005	Tera Intezaar	Rahul Vaidya
2006	Mere Saath Saara Jahaan	Sandeep Acharya
2006	Chal Diye	Amit Sana
2006	Dance Masti Forever	Zubeen Garg, Mahalakshmi Iyer, Shaan, Instant Karma
2006	Sona	Sona Mohapatra
2007	Agnee	Agnee
2007	Dhanyavad	Prashant Tamang
2007	Junoon	Abhijeet Sawant
2008	Humsafar	KK
2008	Koi Aanay Wala Hai	Strings
2020s
2021	ICC Men's T20 World Cup 2021 Official Anthem - Single	Amit Trivedi, Sharvi Yadav & Anand Bhaskar (lyricist: Kausar Munir)

== Tamil Film Soundtracks ==
Sony Music South holds the audio rights for over more than 200 Tamil films.

Year	Movie(s)
1990s
1993	Pudhiya Mugam
1993	Thiruda Thiruda
1994	Karuthamma
1994	Manitha Manitha (Tamil dubbed version)
1996	Indian
2000s
2002	Kadhal Virus
2003	Saamy
2004	Kangalal Kaidhu Sei
2004	Aaytha Ezhuthu
2005	Anniyan
2006	Vettaiyaadu Vilaiyaadu
2006	Vallavan
2007	Guru (Tamil version)
2007	Sivaji
2007	Vel
2008	Dasavathaaram
2008	Sakkarakatti
2008	Pandhayam
2008	Poo
2008	Raman Thediya Seethai
2008	Silambattam
2008	Vaaranam Aayiram
2008	Jodhaa Akbar (Tamil dubbed version)
2008	Subramaniapuram
2009	Vaamanan
2009	Kanthaswamy
2009	Kulir 100°
2009	Laadam
2009	Maasilamani
2009	Modhi Vilayadu
2009	Naadodigal
2009	Pasanga
2009	Pokkisham
2009	Rajadhi Raja
2009	TN 07 AL 4777
2009	Aadhavan
2009	Naan Avan Illai 2
2009	Vennila Kabadi Kuzhu
2010s
2010	Vinnaithaandi Varuvaaya
2010	Raavanan
2010	Goa
2010	Kutty
2010	Naanayam
2010	Pen Singam
2010	Aayirathil Oruvan
2010	Singam
2010	Theeradha Vilaiyattu Pillai
2010	Thillalangadi
2010	Engeyum Kadhal
2010	Paiyaa
2010	Vandae Maatharam
2010	Drohi
2011	Aadukalam
2011	Avan Ivan
2011	Azhagarsamiyin Kuthirai
2011	Ko
2011	Kullanari Koottam
2011	Mankatha
2011	Mappillai
2011	Mudhal Idam
2011	Osthe
2011	Sabash Sariyana Potti
2011	Vandhaan Vendraan
2011	Velayudham
2011	7 Aum Arivu
2011	Vellore Maavattam
2011	Venghai
2012	3
2012	Aarohanam
2012	Billa II
2012	Chaarulatha
2012	Dhoni
2012	Ishtam
2012	Kazhugu
2012	Kumki
2012	Leelai
2012	Maalai Pozhudhin Mayakathilaey
2012	Maattrraan
2012	Mirattal
2012	Neerparavai
2012	Neethaane En Ponvasantham
2012	Oru Kal Oru Kannadi
2012	Podaa Podi
2012	Raattinam
2012	Saattai
2012	Vazhakku Enn 18/9
2013	Kadal
2013	Ainthu Ainthu Ainthu
2013	All in All Azhagu Raja
2013	Arrambam
2013	Biriyani
2013	Desingu Raja
2013	Endrendrum Punnagai
2013	Ethir Neechal
2013	Irandaam Ulagam
2013	Ivan Veramathiri
2013	Kanna Laddu Thinna Aasaiya
2013	Kedi Billa Killadi Ranga
2013	Madha Yaanai Koottam
2013	Maryan
2013	Ambikapathy (Tamil dubbed version)
2013	Nugam
2013	Pattathu Yaanai
2013	Samar
2013	Settai
2013	Sillunu Oru Sandhippu
2013	Summa Nachunu Irukku
2013	Thagaraaru
2013	Thalaivaa
2013	Thanga Meengal
2013	Udhayam NH4
2013	Vanakkam Chennai
2013	Varuthapadatha Valibar Sangam
2013	Vishwaroopam
2013	Ya Ya
2014	Amara Kaaviyam
2014	Anjaan
2014	Damaal Dumeel
2014	Endrendrum
2014	Goli Soda
2014	Idhu Kathirvelan Kadhal
2014	Irumbu Kuthirai
2014	Jeeva
2014	Kaaviyathalaivan
2014	Kappal
2014	Kochadaiiyaan
2014	Maan Karate
2014	Manja Pai
2014	Meaghamann
2014	Naan Sigappu Manithan
2014	Oru Oorla Rendu Raja
2014	Poriyaalan
2014	Rummy
2014	Saivam
2014	Sigaram Thodu
2014	Tenaliraman
2014	Vallavanukku Pullum Aayudham
2014	Vallinam
2014	Vanmam
2014	Vellaikaara Durai
2014	Vennila Veedu
2014	Vetri Selvan
2014	Virattu
2014	Yaamirukka Bayamey
2014	Yaan
2014	Yennamo Yedho
2015	10 Enradhukulla
2015	Anegan
2015	Bhooloham
2015	Eetti
2015	I
2015	Idam Porul Eval
2015	Idhu Enna Maayam
2015	Inimey Ippadithaan
2015	Kaaval
2015	Ko 2
2015	Maari
2015	Nanbenda
2015	O Kadhal Kanmani
2015	Avam
2015	Orange Mittai
2015	Pasanga 2
2015	Puli
2015	Purampokku Engira Podhuvudamai
2015	Romeo Juliet
2015	Sakalakala Vallavan
2015	Sandamarutham
2015	Thanga Magan
2015	Thani Oruvan
2015	Trisha Illana Nayanthara
2015	Uppu Karuvaadu
2015	Uriyadi
2015	Urumeen
2015	Uttama Villain
2015	Vai Raja Vai
2015	Vasuvum Saravananum Onna Padichavanga
2015	Vedalam
2015	Vellaiya Irukiravan Poi Solla Maatan
2015	Yennai Arindhaal
2016	Aandavan Kattalai
2016	Anjala
2016	Iraivi
2016	Iru Mugan
2016	Kadhalum Kadandhu Pogum
2016	Kaththi Sandai
2016	Kattappavae Kaanom
2016	Kavalai Vendam
2016	Kodi
2016	Manithan
2016	Mapla Singam
2016	Marudhu
2016	Meendum Oru Kadhal Kadhai
2016	Miruthan
2016	Pokkiri Raja
2016	Pugazh
2016	Rajini Murugan
2016	Rekka
2016	Remo
2016	Rendavathu Padam
2016	Saithan
2016	Tamilselvanum Thaniyar Anjalum
2016	Uriyadi
2016	Vaaliba Raja
2016	Veera Sivaji
2016	Wagah
2017	Bogan
2017	Kuttram 23
2017	Rubaai
2017	Rangoon
2017	Kattappava Kanom
2017	Dora
2017	Kaatru Veliyidai
2017	Karuppan
2017	Pandigai
2017	Gemini Ganeshanum Suruli Raajanum
2017	Vanamagan
2017	Sangili Bungili Kadhava Thorae
2017	Saravanan Irukka Bayamaen
2017	Vivegam
2017	Katha Nayagan
2017	Velaikkaran
2017	Mersal
2018	Thaana Serntha Kootam
2018	Nimir
2018	Tik Tik Tik
2018	Panjumittai
2018	Kaala Koothu
2018	Veera
2018	Mr. Chandramouli
2018	Kadaikutty Singam
2018	U Turn
2018	Saamy Square
2018	Chekka Chivantha Vaanam
2018	Kanaa
2018	Sandakozhi 2
2018	Sarkar
2018	Ezhumin
2018	Adanga Maru
2018	Vidhi Madhi Ultaa
2018	Silukkuvarupatti Singam
2019	Petta
2019	Kanne Kalaimaane
2019	Boomerang
2019	Uriyadi 2
2019	Monster
2019	Neeya 2
2019	NGK
2019	Nenjamundu Nermaiyundu Odu Raja
2019	Thumbaa
2019	Gorilla
2019	Jackpot
2019	Comali
2019	Kaappaan
2019	100% Kadhal
2019	Puppy
2019	Bigil
2019	Sangathamizhan
2019	Iruttu
2019	Dhanusu Raasi Neyargale
2020s
2020	Psycho
2020	Naadodigal 2
2020	Seeru
2020	Vaanam Kottattum
2020	Oh My Kadavule
2020	Dharala Prabhu
2020	Pon Manickavel
2020	Soorarai Pottru
2020	Ponmagal Vandhal
2020	Penguin
2021	Master
2021	Bhoomi
2021	Jagame Thandhiram
2021	MGR Magan
2021	Mandela
2021	Mudhal Nee Mudivum Nee
2021	Dikkilona
2021	Murungakkai Chips
2021	Doctor
2021	Aelay
2021	Vaazhl
2022	Naai Sekar
2022	Mahaan
2022	Valimai
2022	Hey Sinamika
2022	Kaathu Vaakula Rendu Kaadhal
2022	Don
2022	Vikram
2022	Gargi
2022	Viruman
2022	Cobra
2022	Selfie
2022	Sardar
2022	Love Today
2022	Kaari
2023	The Great Indian Kitchen
2023	Pathu Thala
2023	Viduthalai Part 1
2023	Maamannan
2023	Leo
2023	Dhruva Natchathiram
2024	Ayalaan
2024	Lal Salaam
2024	Unarvugal Thodarkadhai
2024	Star
2024	Indian 2
2024	Vettaiyan
2024	Viduthalai Part 2
2025	Mr. Housekeeping
2025	Vidaamuyarchi
2025	Love Marriage
2026	With Love
2026	Love Insurance Kompany
2026	Mr. X
2026	29
2026	Dorothy
2026	Scene

== Pop Music (Tamil) ==
Year	Album & Single(s)	Artist(s)
1990s
1998	Mr.Devi	Devi Sri Prasad

== Telugu Film Soundtracks ==
Year	Movie(s)
1990s
1994	Gangmaster
1994	Donga Donga (Telugu dubbed version)
1994	Super Police
2000s
2008	Nenu Meeku Telusa
2009	Baanam
2009	Arya 2
2009	Saleem
2010s
2010	Khaleja
2010	Puli
2010	Ye Maaya Chesave
2012	Devudu Chesina Manushulu
2012	Yeto Vellipoyindhi Manasu
2012	Eega
2015	Courier Boy Kalyan
2018	Nannu Dochukunduvate
2018	U Turn
2019	Mr. Majnu
2019	Chitralahari
2019	Gaddalakonda Ganesh
2019	Falaknama Das
2019	Raja Vaaru Rani Gaaru
2020s
2020
2020	HIT
2020	College Kumar
2020	Solo Brathuke So Better
2020	Ashoka Vanamlo Arjuna Kalyanam
2020	Ranga Ranga Vaibhavanga
2021
2021	Sreekaram
2021	Gaali Sampath
2021	Vivaha Bhojanambu
2022	Sita Ramam
2023	Veera Simha Reddy
2023	Waltair Veerayya
2023	Meter
2024	Saripodhaa Sanivaaram
2024	Mechanic Rocky
2025	They Call Him OG

== Malayalam Film Soundtracks ==
Year	Movie(s)	Ref.
1990s
1990	Akkare Akkare Akkare	
1992	Roja (Malayalam)	
1991	Abhimanyu	
1993	Sarovaram	
1993	Venkalam	
1994	Thenmavin Kombathu	
1994	Sainyam	
1994	Sopanam	
1994	Varaphalam	
1995	Chantha	
1996	Varnappakittu	
1996	Sallapam	
1996	Harbour	
1997	Lelam	
1997	Chandralekha	
1997	Rishyasringan	
1998	Akasha Ganga 1	
1998	Rakthasakshikal Zindabad	
1999	Thenkasipattanam	
1999	Prem Poojari	
	Millennium Stars	
2000s
2000		
2001	Sundarapurushan	
2002		
2003	Vettam	
2004		
2005		
2006	Lion	
2006	Aarya (Malayalam)	
2006	Bus Conductor	
2007	Challenge	
	Devadas (Malayalam)	
2008		
2009	Kerala Varma Pazhassi Raja	
2010s
2012	Chaarulatha (Malayalam)	
2014	Pradhi Nayagan (Malayalam)	
2015	Amar Akbar Anthony	
2017	The Sound Story	
2017	Rosapoo	
2019	9	
2020s
2020	Penguin (Malayalam)	
2020	Soorarai Pottru (Malayalam)	
2021	Jagame Thandhiram (Malayalam)	
2021	Udanpirappe (Malayalam)	
2021	Jai Bhim (Malayalam)	
2022	Mahaan (Malayalam)	
2022	Panthrand	
2022	Sita Ramam (Malayalam)	
2022	Mike	
2022	Liger (Malayalam)	
2022	Sundari Gardens	
2022	Cobra (Malayalam)	
2022	Brahmāstram: Bhagam Onnu – Shiva (Malayalam)	
2022	FAR	
2022	4 Years	
2022	Poovan	
2023	Lovefully Yours Veda	
2023	Mindiyum Paranjum	
2023	Virupaksha (Malayalam)	
2023	King of Kotha	
2023	Leo (Malayalam)	
2024	1 Princess Street	
2024	Nancy Rani	
2024	Little Hearts	
2024	Sureshanteyum Sumalathayudeyum Hrudayahariyaya Pranayakadha	
2024	Surya's Saturday (Malayalam)	
2024	Bougainvillea	
2024	Barroz 3D	
2024	Marco	
2025	Identity	
2025	Pravinkoodu Shappu	
2025	Thudarum	
2025	Dear Joy	
2025	Narivetta	
2025	Vyasanasametham Bandhumithradhikal	
2025	Paradha (Malayalam)	
2025	They Call Him OG (Malayalam)	
2026	Pallichattambi	
2026	Mollywood Times	
2026	I, Nobody	
2026	Law and Order	
2026	Khalifa: The Ruler	
2026	Bachelor Party D'eux	

== Pop Music (Malayalam) ==
Year	Works(s)	Artist(s)	Musical Release
2010s
2012	Yuvvh	Sreejith - Saachin, Various Artists	Album
2013	Uyire	Naveen Madhav, Rita	Single
2019	Karutha Penne "Rendition" (Cover)	Sanah Moidutty	Single
2019	Sreeragamo "Rendition" (Cover)	Sanah Moidutty	Single
2020s
2022	Theeyayi Ullil	Sanah Moidutty	Single
2022	Kasavinaal	Jubair Muhammed, Hanan Shaah	Single
2022	Pullikuyil	Shibukallar, Shweta Mohan, Sarath Santhosh	Single
2022	Materum Malayalakarayane "Onorukkam"	Subhash Mohanraj, Stephen Devassy	Single
2022	Onam Thiruvonam	Alphons Joseph, Crossroads School Of Music, Fasil LJ, Various Artists	EP
2024	Beevi	Rish NK, Zail	Single
2024	SAVUSAI (Bilingual)	AZWIN, Lil PAYYAN	Single
2024	Ariyallo (Bilingual)	Shiv Paul, Anohnymouss, A-Gan	Single
2024	Aayiram Aura	Fejo, Jeffin Jestin	Single
2025	Varavu	Thudwiser, ItsPc, Müsli	Single
2025	CHAAK	AZWIN, Joker390P, Efy Music	Single
2025	Kavala Talk	ThirumaLi, Jay Stellar	Single
2025	Sadiq	Rish NK, Zail	Single
2025	Sick	Fejo, Jeffin Jestin	Single
2025	Malayali Manka	Thudwiser, AYARKAY	Single
2025	Baby Cool Ayirunne	Fejo, Jeffin Jestin	Single
2025	Vazhikatti (Kizhakku Suryan)	Fejo, Jeffin Jestin, Daleema (Sample Artist)	Single
2025	Saanandam Vazhthunnen (Christmas Harmony)	Chorus, Jerry Amaldev, Kaithapram, Ouseppachan, Berny P.J	Single
2026	Saroja	Farhash, Muthu, Cee Vee, Ashley Milred	Single
2026	Minnal	Aromal Chekaver, copiedthecat	Single
2026	Junoon	Hanan Shaah, Fathima Jahaan, Ali Najih, Chris Wayne	Single
2026	Namaskaram	ThirumaLi, Jeffin Jestin	Single
2026	For A Reason	Fejo, Jeffin Jestin	Single
2026	Chol Chol Kilimakale	Music Directors, Mohan Sithara, B.K. Harinarayanan	Single

== Kannada Film Soundtracks ==
Year	Movie(s)
2016	Nagarahavu
2018	Dhwaja

== Bengali Film Soundtracks ==
Year	Movie(s)
2016	Colkatay Columbus
2022	Kacher Manush
2023	Manobjomin
2023	Doctor Bakshi

== Assamese Film Soundtracks ==
Year	Movie(s)
2017	Konwarpuror Konwar
2019	Kokaideo Bindass

== Punjabi Film Soundtracks ==
Year	Movie
2014	Mundeyan Ton Bachke Rahin
2019	Do Dooni Panj

== Pop Music (Punjabi) ==
Album(s)
Landers Punjabi
Cut Like A Diamond
This Is Hardy Sandhu
