= Eat Pray Thug =

Studio album by Heems
- Released: March 10, 2015
- Genre: Hip-hop
- Length: 39:48
- Label: Megaforce
- Producers: Gordon Voidwell; Harry Fraud; Bill Ding; Devonte Hynes; Boody B; Keyboard Kid 206

Heems chronology
Wild Water Kingdom (2012)	Eat Pray Thug (2015)	Lafandar (2024)

Singles from Eat Pray Thug
- 1. "Sometimes" Released: January 8, 2015

Eat Pray Thug is the debut studio album by American hip-hop artist Heems. It was released on Megaforce Records on March 10, 2015. Music videos were created for "Sometimes", "Damn, Girl", and "Pop Song (Games)".

== Critical reception ==
Professional ratings
Aggregate scores
Source	Rating
Metacritic	76/100
Review scores
Source	Rating
AllMusic	4/5 stars
The A.V. Club	B
Consequence of Sound	B−
Cuepoint (Expert Witness)	A
Exclaim!	8/10
Pitchfork	6.3/10
PopMatters	7/10 stars
Rolling Stone	3.5/5 stars
The Skinny	3/5 stars
Spin	8/10

At Metacritic, which assigns a weighted average score out of 100 to reviews from mainstream critics, Eat Pray Thug received an average score of 76, based on 12 reviews, indicating "generally favorable reviews".

Colin Fitzgerald of PopMatters gave the album 7 stars out of 10, saying: "The beats on Eat Pray Thug are as wacky and irreverent as they were on Das Racist's mixtapes and their lone studio album Relax, but Heems is 180 degrees more serious on his own." Max Mertens of Exclaim! called it "the soundtrack of a son of immigrant parents learning that while you might be able to return home, nothing will be the same as how you left it."

Jayson Greene of Pitchfork said: "A handful of songs draw directly on his experiences as an Indian-American in a post–9/11 world, and they are sharply observed, painful, emotional, and deeply quotable." Zach Schonfeld of The A.V. Club gave the album a grade of B, describing it as "an unfailingly direct set of meditations on post-9/11 racism and failed love, set to skeletal beats and bracing, plainspoken hooks." Writing in Cuepoint, Robert Christgau gave the record an "A" and said "this is rapping that foregrounds the variegations of the ordinary speaking voice—its cracks, its rumbles, its anxious highs, its distracted lows, its deep-seated imperfections and insecurities. It's very American."

=== Accolades ===
Publication	Accolade	Rank	Ref.
PopMatters	80 Best Albums of 2015	63	
Spin	50 Best Hip-Hop Albums of 2015	9	
Vice	Top 26 Overlooked Albums of 2015	N/A	
The Village Voice	Pazz & Jop	3	

== Track listing ==
No.	Title	Producer(s)	Length
1.	"Sometimes"	Gordon Voidwell	4:01
2.	"So NY"	Harry Fraud	3:40
3.	"Damn, Girl"	Gordon Voidwell	3:38
4.	"Jawn Cage" (featuring Rafiq Bhatia)	Gordon Voidwell	3:02
5.	"Flag Shopping"	Bill Ding	3:56
6.	"Pop Song (Games)"	Gordon Voidwell	4:19
7.	"Home" (featuring Dev Hynes)	Dev Hynes	3:57
8.	"Hubba Hubba"	Boody B	2:46
9.	"Al Q8a"	Boody B	3:27
10.	"Suicide by Cop"	Keyboard Kid 206	3:12
11.	"Patriot Act"	Boody B	3:50
Total length:			39:48

== Charts ==
Chart	Peak position
US Heatseekers Albums (Billboard)	8
US Independent Albums (Billboard)	24
US Top R&B/Hip-Hop Albums (Billboard)	32
US Rap Albums (Billboard)	21
