= Alangu =

2024 Tamil film by S.P. Shakthivel

- Theatrical release poster
- Directed by: S. P. Shakthivel
- Written by: S. P. Shakthivel
- Produced by: D Sabareesh; S.A. Sangamithra
- Starring: Gunanidhi; Chemban Vinod; Kaali Venkat; Appani Sarath
- Cinematography: S. Pandikumar
- Edited by: San Lokesh
- Music by: Ajesh
- Production companies: DG Film Company; Magnas Productions
- Distributed by: Sakthi Film Factory
- Release date: 27 December 2024
- Country: India
- Languages: Tamil; Malayalam

Alangu is a 2024 Indian action thriller film written and directed by S.P. Shakthivel. The film is produced by D Sabareesh and S.A. Sangamithra under DG Film Company in association with Magnas Productions. The film stars Chemban Vinod, Gunanidhi and Kaali Venkat in the lead roles, alongside Appani Sarath, Sreerekha and others in supporting roles. Set in the Tamil Nadu-Kerala border, the film contains both Tamil and Malayalam dialogues.

Alangu released in theatres on 27 December 2024.

== Premise ==
The film revolves around the real life events across the borders of Tamil Nadu and Kerala and also the conflict between Malayali political groups and Tamil tribal youths.

== Cast ==
- Gunanidhi as Dharma
- Chemban Vinod as Augustine
- Kaali Venkat as Malayan
- Appani Sarath as Philip
- Sreerekha
- Kotravai
- Regin Rose
- Shanmugam Muthusamy
- Master Ajay
- Idhayakumar

== Production ==
=== Development ===
In late August 2023, writer-director S.P. Shakthivel who is known for Urumeen (2015) and Payanigal Gavanikkavum (2022) was announced to helm his next project titled Alangu, referring to King Raja Raja Chozha's war dog troops. The film stars newcomer Gunanidhi, Kaali Venkat and Chemban Vinod in the lead roles, alongside Appani Sarath, Sreerekhaa, Kotravai,Regin Rose, Shanmugam Muthusamy, Master Ajay, Idhayakumar and others in supporting roles. The film is produced by D Sabareesh and politician Anbumani Ramadoss's daughter S.A. Sangamithra under their DG Film Company and Magnas Productions respectively. The technical crew consists of cinematographer S.Pandikumar, editor San Lokesh and music composer Ajesh.

=== Filming ===
Several stray dogs were adopted and trained for the film. Principal photography took place in the forest locations of Attappadi, Idukki, Anaikatti, Kambam, and Theni in a single schedule for 52 days.

=== Post-production ===
The dubbing process was completed by the end of December 2023, and post-production wrapped in 2023.

== Music ==
Alangu

Soundtrack album by Ajesh
- Released: November 8, 2024
- Genre: Feature film soundtrack
- Length: 16:00
- Language: Tamil
- Label: Sony Music South
- Producer: Ajesh

Singles from Alangu
- 1. "Kaaliyamma" Released: 19 January 2024; 2. "Kongu Song" Released: 17 July 2024

The soundtrack is composed by Ajesh. The first single "Kaaliyamma" released on 19 January 2024. The second single "Kongu Song" released on 17 July 2024.

Track listing
No.	Title	Lyrics	Singer(s)	Length
1.	"Kaaliyamma"	Mohan Rajan	Sathyaprakash	3:23
2.	"Puli Yaaru Nari Yaaru"	Vishnu Edavan, Fejo	Anthony Daasan, Fejo	4:09
3.	"Kongu Song"	Kavin	Kidakuzhi Mariyammal	3:33
4.	"Appavin Thaalaatu"	Mohan Rajan	Ajesh	3:18
5.	"Senguruvi"	Kavin	Shamala Devi, Akshaya Shivkumar, Sharath Matthew, Dinesh Pandi	1:37
Total length:				16:00

== Release ==
=== Theatrical ===
Alangu released in theatres on 27 December 2024.

=== Home media ===
The film began streaming on Amazon Prime Video from 17 January 2025.

== Reception ==
=== Critical response ===
Thinkal Menon of The Times of India gave 3/5 stars and wrote "SP Shakthivel's revenge drama is an example of impressive making elevating an okayish screenplay. He manages to set up a convincing universe in the first few sequences, leaving the audience intrigued." Sreejith Mullappilly of Cinema Express gave 3/5 stars and wrote "After all, there are some stories about man and his best friend that tug at our heartstrings with their simple premise itself, even if the novelty is more in the performances. Warts and all, Alangu is one such film."
