= Vedan (rapper) =

Indian rapper and songwriter

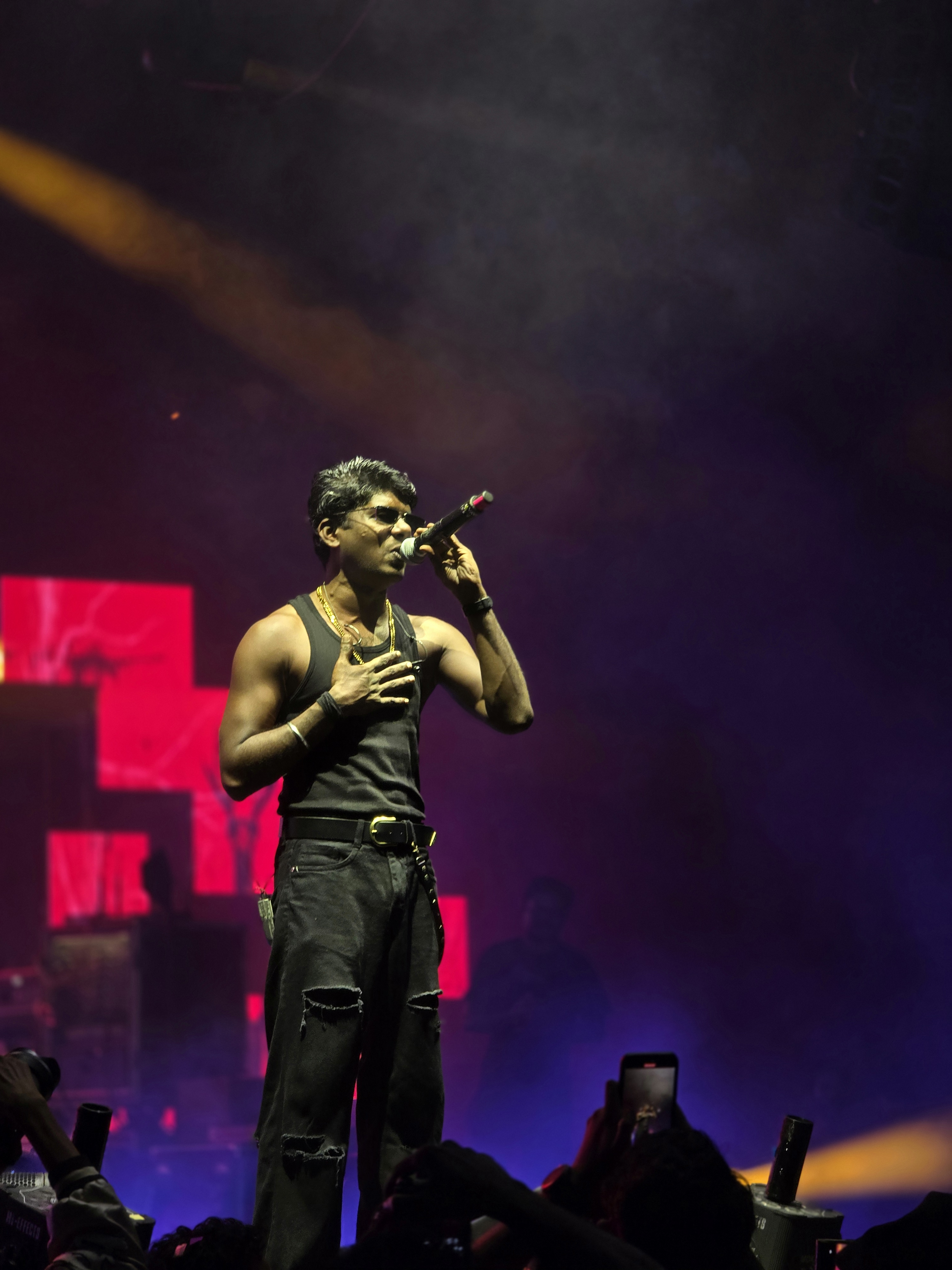
- Vedan in 2024

Background information
- Born: Hirandas Murali; 25 October 1994 (age 32); Thrissur, Kerala, India
- Genres: Malayalam hip hop; Rap
- Occupations: Rapper; Songwriter
- Years active: 2020–present
- Labels: Mass Appeal India, Sony Music India, Karupp Records
- Spouse: Navami Latha (m. 2026)
- Award: Kerala State Film Awards

Hirandas Murali (born 25 October 1994), known professionally as Vedan, is an Indian rapper and songwriter from Kerala, India. His songs often address themes of savarna caste politics, class, and resistance, and span both independent releases and contributions to Malayalam cinema. In 2025, he was awarded the Kerala State Film Award for Best Lyricist.

He is best known for his tracks, "Kuthanthram" (from "Manjummel Boys"), "Kondal Vedan Song" (from "Kondal"), "La Vida", "Mauna Loa", and "Voice of Voiceless".

== Early life ==
Vedan was born in Thrissur, Kerala. His mother, an Eelam Tamil from Jaffna, Sri Lanka, migrated to Ooty, Tamil Nadu, during the Sri Lankan civil war. She was granted asylum in India and later received Indian citizenship from the Government of India. Vedan’s father, Murali, is a Malayali from the Paniya community and a native of Thrissur. Vedan spent his childhood in a residential complex called Swapnabhoomi, located near the Thrissur railway station.

His early musical influences included Tamil hip-hop artists such as Yogi B, Natchatra, and Dhilip Varman, as well as international musicians like Michael Jackson and Bob Marley. He gave his first public performance of an original composition during a protest against the Citizenship Amendment Act (CAA) and the National Register of Citizens (NRC) in Fort Kochi. The performance, by an invitation from the band Oorali, marked the beginning of his career as a socially engaged artist.

== Career ==
=== 2020: Debut with "Voice of the Voiceless" ===
Vedan began his career in 2020 with the release of his debut music video “Voice of the Voiceless,” which addressed caste-based discrimination, marginalization, and social injustice. The video, released on YouTube, received attention for its political themes and direct lyricism, and has garnered over 1.8 crore views.

He followed it the same year with "Bhoomi", a song reflecting on global humanitarian issues, including the Syrian civil war, the Israeli–Palestinian conflict, and the death of Aylan Kurdi.

=== 2021–2023: Film debut, label deals ===
In 2021, Vedan made his debut in film music with the track "Narabali" from the Malayalam film “Nayattu”. Later that year, he released the music video for “Vaa”, which addressed themes of caste-based oppression and the societal position of marginalized communities. The video garnered over seven million views on YouTube.

He continued to grow his presence with "Social Criminal", released in 2023, a track that challenged systems of oppression on both local and global levels. That same year, Vedan signed a non-exclusive deal with the music label Mass Appeal India. He collaborated with KSHMR and Dabzee on “La Vida” featured on the album “Karam,” released through Mass Appeal India and Dharma Worldwide.

=== 2024 - present: Mainstream recognition with Manjummel Boys, launching "Karupp Records" ===
In 2024, Vedan gained mainstream recognition with the track "Kuthanthram", which he co-wrote and performed for the Malayalam film "Manjummel Boys", composed by Sushin Shyam. The song received widespread attention alongside the success of the film and accumulated over 50 million streams. He followed this with Kondal (2024) for the film Kondal, Veeran for the film "Checkmate" and Maranathin Niram for the film "No Way Out". His most recent film contribution is Va Veda (2025) for the movie "Narivetta". He was also featured in the song Kisses in the Clouds from the critically acclaimed movie All We Imagine as Light (2024).

In May 2024, Vedan launched Karupp Records, an independent record label aimed at promoting and supporting underrepresented artists. Since its beginning, the label has signed several talents. Alongside his film works, Vedan continued to release independent tracks that explored a range of themes. Later In 2024, he released Theruvinte Mon, a song rooted in street life and resistance. In 2025, he surprised his listeners with Mauna Loa, a love themed song that was widely appreciated and showed a new side to his music. Released through Mass Appeal India, it became his fastest track to surpass 10 million streams.

== Notable performances ==
In 2024, he performed at Gully Fest, in Mumbai, one of India’s major hip-hop festivals, headlined by rapper Divine. The same year, he was also part of Rap91, another prominent event featuring rap artists from across the country. His other notable performances include Para Hip Hop Festival (2024) organised by the Kochi Music Foundation, Royal Enfield Motoverse (2024) in Goa, and Ocha Festival (2024), Kochi, among many others.

== Accolades ==
Year	Award	Category	Recipient	Result	Notes	Ref.
2025	55th Kerala State Film Awards	Best Lyrics	"Kuthanthram" from Manjummel Boys	Won		

== Controversies ==
=== Drug activities and the possession of protected wildlife assets ===
On 28 April 2025, Vedan and eight others were arrested by the Kerala Excise Department for alleged possession of approximately six grams of cannabis at a flat in Kochi. During a search of his residence, authorities discovered a tiger tooth pendant, which had been gifted to him by a Sri Lankan national he met through Instagram. Following this, the Kerala Forest and Wildlife Department took him into custody under provisions of the Wildlife Protection Act. After a case was registered against Vedan for alleged possession of a tiger tooth, a resident of Thrissur filed a separate complaint against actor and politician Suresh Gopi, alleging that he was also in possession of a pendant featuring a leopard tooth. Possession of such items is considered a non-bailable offense under the Wildlife Protection Act. Vedan was later released on bail.

In May 2026, forensic analysis conducted by the Zoological Survey of India laboratory in Kolkata confirmed that the pendant was a genuine tiger tooth. Following the report, the Kerala Forest Department initiated procedures to submit a formal chargesheet against him under the Wild Life Protection Act, 1972.

=== Sexual abuse ===
In 2021, Vedan was allegedly accused of sexual misconduct by a few women via a post that was shared on a Facebook page as part of the MeToo movement. However, there were no formal legal cases that progressed. Following an apology posted by Vedan on social media in June 2021, the survivors issued a joint statement through the "Women Against Sexual Harassment" Facebook page, rejecting his apology. They stated that the rapper had never personally reached out to them and that his public statement was a self-serving attempt to safeguard his career and reputation rather than an act of genuine remorse.

In July 2025, a rape case was filed against Vedan by the Thrikkakara police in Kochi, Kerala, following a complaint by a young doctor. The complainant alleged that Vedan sexually assaulted her multiple times between August 2021 and March 2023 under the false promise of marriage, after they connected through social media. Vedan was later granted bail by the court. The court noted that treating physical intimacy as rape after the end of a relationship would be "illogical and harsh," and that there was no claim that the promise of marriage was false from the beginning.

In his bail plea, Vedan said that he and his team had earlier received threats of being framed in such cases. He alleged that the complaint was part of a plan to damage his reputation and extort money. However, a subsequent police investigation led by the Thrikkakara Assistant Commissioner of Police (ACP) found no evidence to support these conspiracy allegations.

The investigation, initiated following a complaint by the rapper's family to the Chief Minister, concluded that there was no external involvement or organized plot behind the sexual assault complaints filed by the women.

In October 2025, the Thrikkakara police filed a formal charge sheet against the rapper in the Ernakulam Judicial First Class Magistrate Court. The charges were based on a complaint alleging sexual assault under the false promise of marriage between 2021 and 2023.

A testimony published in Keraleeyam Masika detailed allegations from another survivor regarding experiences of physical and sexual violence. The survivor alleged that after a disagreement concerning the rapper's portrayal of his mother, he responded with physical aggression. She claimed the resulting violence was so severe it left her with physical injuries and difficulty walking the next day. Furthermore, she alleged that he later described the incident to his peers as a display of dominance. The survivor also criticized his public apologies as strategic and insincere, claiming that he continued to engage in similar behavior toward other women.

== Discography ==
=== Singles ===
Year	Title	Co-Artist(s)	Label
2020	"Voice Of Voiceless."		
2020	"Bhoomi"		
2021	"Vaa"		
2021	"Budhanayi Pira"	HRISHI	
2023	"Social Criminal"	HRISHI	
2023	"Aana"	HRISHI	
2023	"La Vida"	KSHMR, Dabzee	Mass Appeal India & Dharma Worldwide
2024	"Theruvinte Mon"	HRISHI	Saina Music Indie
2024	"Karma"	Abhi	Saina Music Indie
2024	"Kadha"	ABRAW	Mass Appeal India
2024	"Urangatte"	HRISHI	Saina Music Indie
2025	"Muana Loa"	AZWIN	Mass Appeal India

=== Film songs ===
Year	Song title	Film	Composer	Co-singer(s)	Notes	Ref.
2021	"Narabali"	Nayattu	Vishnu Vijay		Lyricist, Singer	
2022	"Maranathin Niram"	No Way Out	Hrishi		Lyricist, Singer	
2022	"Paanju Paanju"	Padavettu	Govind Vasantha		Lyricist, Singer	
2024	"Kuthanthram"	Manjummel Boys	Sushin Shyam		Lyricist, Singer	
2024	"Veeran"	Checkmate	Ratish Sekhar		Lyricist, Singer	
2024	"Kondal Vedan Song"	Kondal	Sam C. S.		Lyricist, Singer	
2024	"Kisses in the Clouds"	All We Imagine as Light	Topshe	Haniya Nafisa	Lyricist, Singer	
2025	"Vaada Veda"	Narivetta	Tippushan, Shiyas Hassan	Jakes Bejoy	Lyricist, Singer	
2025	"Rekka Rekka"	Bison Kaalamaadan	Nivas K. Prasanna	Arivu	Tamil song	
2025	"Bhootha Ganam"	Nellikkampoyil Night Riders	Yakzan Gary Pereira, Neha S Nair		Also lyrics	
2026	"Bum Baa Diga Diga"	DC	Anirudh Ravichander	Anirudh Ravichander	Tamil song; Also co-lyricist with Heisenberg	
2026	"Mannea En Makkalea"	Arisi	Ilaiyaraaja		Tamil song	
