= Fura (rapper) =

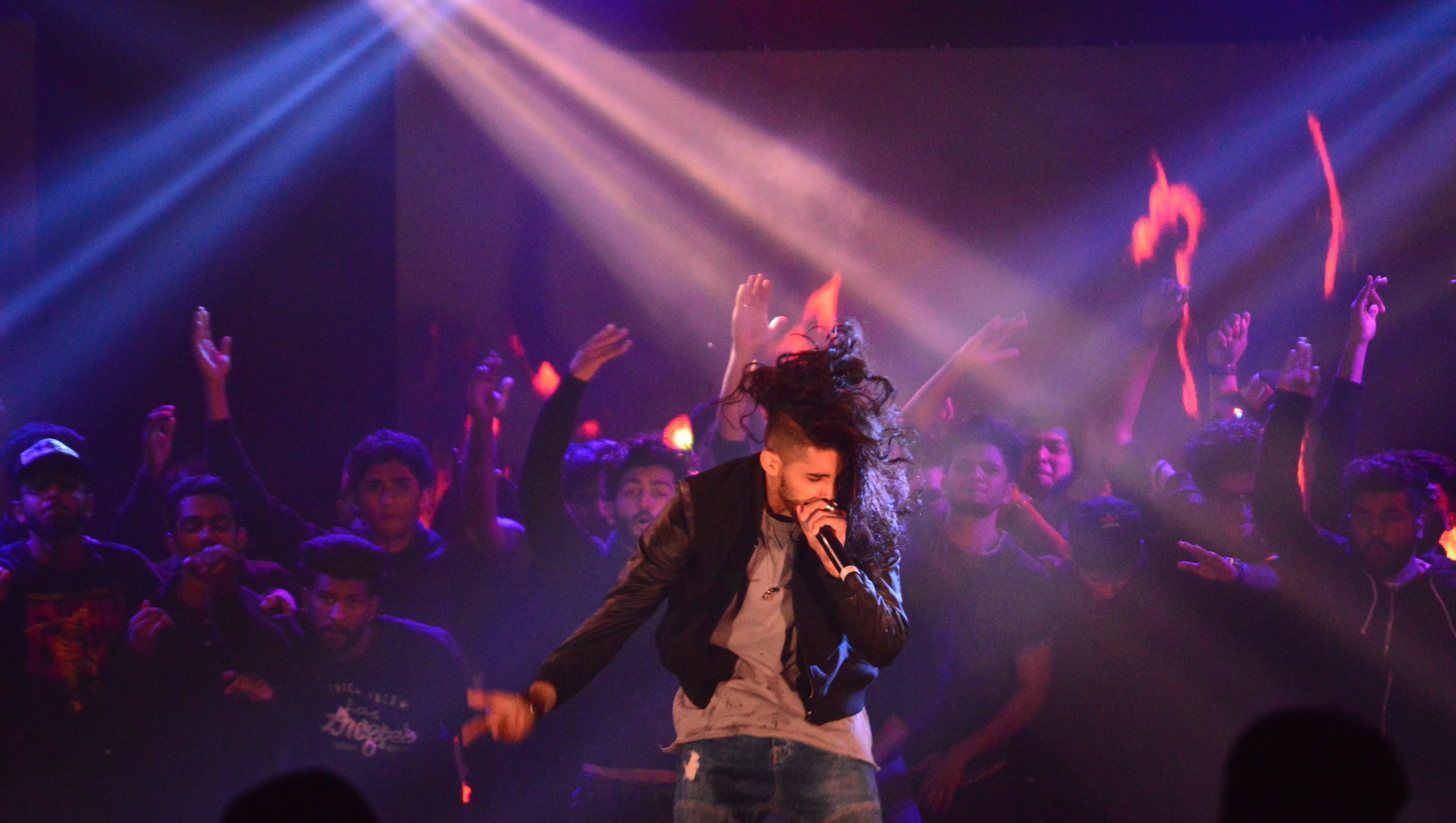

Background information
- Also known as: FuraFreezy, Fura Ajmal, Ihatefura
- Born: Ajmal Abdul Rahiman; 27 June 1991 (age 35); Kerala, India
- Genre: Hip hop
- Occupations: Rapper, songwriter
- Years active: 2010–present
- Website: www.fura.co

Ajmal Abdul Rahiman known by his stage name Fura is an Indian rapper, music producer, and singer based in Dubai. Born in Kasaragod, Kerala, Fura moved to Dubai when he was two years old. He gained fame through his various live performances and online musical performances and features.

Fura became popular after a feature verse on an R&B cover version of "Tum Hi Ho" which was uploaded on YouTube in May 2013. He is most famous for his singles "Emarat", "Bounce","Pehla Pyar", "This Generation" & "Fcuk You Kony" which was aimed at creating an awareness for Kony 2012 in the United Arab Emirates. Other major features by him include the "Summer Paradise" Cover with Jasim & Alwin and "Whistle" Cover with Jasim.

== Career ==
Fura started off as an underground independent artist from Dubai, and his work started to gain momentum and exposure during the year 2017 when Hard Kaur featured him on the Title track "All Stars Anthem" with some of India's best underground and mainstream rappers.

After this, his long time collaborator Jasim saw his potential and featured him on the Title track for Abhraminte Santhathikal which features Mammootty in the main role and Gopi Sundar being the musical director.

He has also featured a bonus track from the movie Ranam for the track Aydhamedudha which was produced by Jakes Bejoy.

He has also been nominated at the MTV Europe Music Award 2017 for the track "All stars anthem" which won the MTV Europe Music Award for Best Indian Act.

== Collaborations ==
Title	Album/ Movie	Other Artists	Music director	Ref(s)
"Abrahaminte Santhathikal Theme Music"	Abrahaminte Santhathikal	Fura, Jasim,	Gopi Sundar	
"Ayudhameduda"	Ranam	Jakes Bejoy, Fura, Fejo, Ajaey Shravan	Jakes Bejoy	
"Taxiwala Drift Scene"	Taxiwala	Fura, Jasim	Jakes Bejoy	
"All Stars Anthem"	The Rising Mixtape Vol.1	Hard Kaur, Shah Rule, Illa Straight, Tony Sebastian, Fura, Balan Kashmir	Hard Kaur	
"Murderraahh"	The Rising Mixtape Vol.1	Hard Kaur, Fura, ikka Singh, Radnyi	Hard Kaur	

== Awards and nominations ==
Year	Awards	Category	Song	Artists	Recipient	Outcome	Ref(s)
2017	MTV Europe Music Award	MTV Europe Music Award for Best Indian Act	All Stars Anthem	Hard Kaur, Shah Rule, Illa Straight, Tony Sebastian, Fura, Balan Kashmir|	Hard Kaur	Won	
