= Irshad =

Irshad is a masculine given name of Arabic origin. Notable people with the name include:

== Given name ==
- Irshad (actor) (born 1979), Indian actor of Malayalam films
- Irshad Ali (sport shooter) (born 1966), Pakistan's shooter
- Irshad Ashraf (born 1974), British documentary film maker
- Irshad Kamil (born 1971), an Indian Hindi/Urdu poet and lyricist
- Irshad Khan (born 1963), surbahar and sitar player based in Canada
- Irshad Manji (born 1968), Canadian author, educator at New York University, and advocate of a "reformist" interpretation of Islam
- Irshad Panjatan (born 1931), Indian actor and veteran mime artist
