= ThirumaLi =

Indian rapper and songwriter (born 1995)

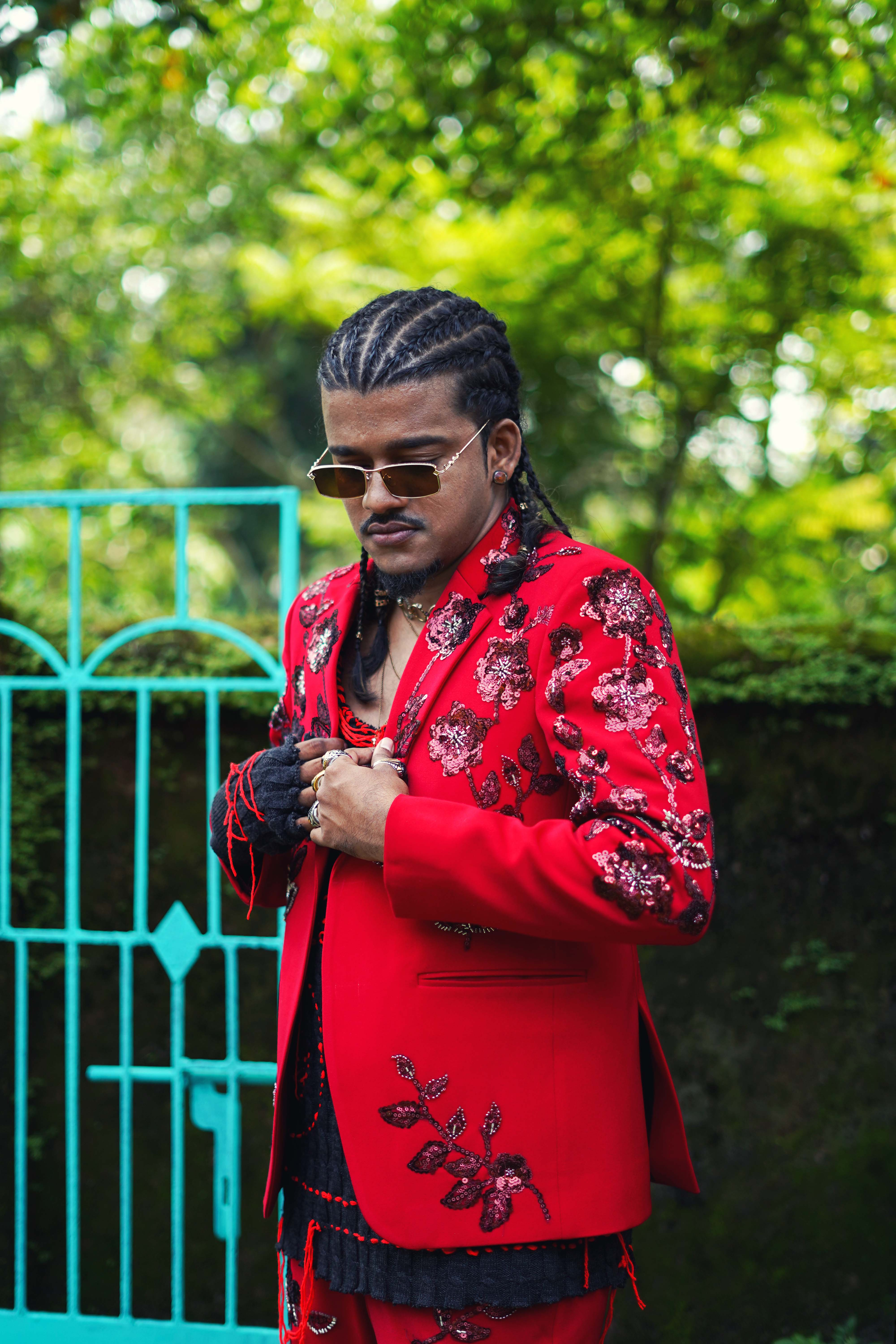
- ThirumaLi during "Sambar" Music Video Shoot

Background information
- Born: Vishnu M S Kottayam, Kerala, India
- Genres: Hip-hop; pop; R&B
- Occupations: Rapper; singer; songwriter
- Years active: 2018–present
- Labels: Mass Appeal; Def Jam; UMG
- Website: thirumali.com

Vishnu M S better known by his stage name ThirumaLi, is Indian rapper, singer and songwriter from Kerala who started making music in 2013, and rose to a professional solo career in 2018 pioneering the Malayalam Rap genre. He is best known for his singles, "Naadan Vibe", "Malayali Da", "Sambar", "Avastha" and "Naade Naattaare (from Operation Java)". He is widely recognized for his Malayalam rap songs that showcase profound lyrics and narratives behind each track.

== Early life ==
Vishnu was born in Kottayam, Kerala. He began listening to artists like Eminem and Michael Jackson's music when he was young and influenced into Hip-hop music. He achieved Diploma in Audio Engineering and Software Engineering. Later, he ultimately discovered his passion in rap, and started making music in 2013 before getting recognized.

== Career ==
His first single "Swasakosham", referring to a message about "anti-smoking", was taken down. Eventually, he released "Malayali Da" same year, which rose to popularity, grossing the Malayalam Charts, with over 13 million on YouTube. Soon after, He gained recognition and was seen performing at major music festivals like Indiegaga, PayTM Insider's FANDOM, RED FM's South Side Stories and many more including various Educational College Fests.

In 2020, Along with Alphons Joseph, He was featured as the songwriter and rapper for the track "Unnikrishnan", from the movie "Varane Avasyamund".

Later in 2021, He released "Aliya", through Universal Music India's sub-label Found Out, the track was featured in several charts.

In 2023, He was signed to Def Jam Recordings with his track "Sambar" which featured the Malayalam Industry's popular hip-hop artists Dabzee, FEJO, and Thudwiser.

In 2024, He was officially signed to Mass Appeal India with his single "Thericho".

== Discography ==
=== Singles ===
Year	Title	Featuring	Label	Notes	Ref.
2020	"Naadan Vibe"	Ribin Richard			
2022	"Olam" (Football anthem)	Thudwiser	Mass Appeal India		
2023	"Rap Money"	Thudwiser			
2023	"Sambar"	Thudawiser, Fejo, Dabzee	Def Jam India	video music features Mrz Thoppi	
2024	"Legacy"	Jay Stellar	Mass Appeal India		
2024	"Thericho"	Jay Stellar	Mass Appeal India		
2024	"Pacha Parishkari"	Jay Stellar	Saregama		
2025	"Kavala Talk"	Jay Stellar	Sony Music		
2025	"Ulsava Rave"	Fejo, Thudwiser	Universal Music India	for Hyundai Spotlight	
2025	"Kulasthree"	Thudwiser	Def Jam India		

=== Film Songs ===
Year	Film	Song	Featuring	Label	Notes	Ref.
2021	Operation Java	"Naade Naattaare"	Jakes Bejoy, Fejo			
