= Sekhar Menon =

Indian DJ, composer, and actor

- Born: Chandrasekhar R. 16 June 1983 (age 43); Kochi, Kerala, India
- Other name: DJ Sekhar
- Occupations: DJ; composer; actor
- Years active: 2009; 2012 – present
- Spouse: Maya
- Children: 2

Sekhar Menon (born 16 June 1983) is an Indian disc jockey, composer, and film actor. He has deejayed at over 500 stages in Kerala, in addition to his acting and composing in Malayalam cinema.

== Early life ==
Sekhar was born to C. Radhakrishnan and Ambika Devi. He has a degree in Sound Engineering from Chennai.

== Career ==
=== Acting ===
Sekhar made his debut in acting in 2012, in Aashiq Abu's movie, Da Thadiya, as the lead. He was the main antagonist in 2014 movie Gangster. He also appeared in notable roles in few other movies.

=== Music ===
Sekhar began his full time deejaying career in 2001 at a venue called Formula 1. Since 1998, he has followed funk, hip-hop, house, soul and R&B, which were not commercially mainstream at the time. To develop his skills, he studied established local DJs, including Johnson, Vishnu, Suraj and Jakes. Because music was difficult to source, he researched in internet cafes, and relied on contacts abroad to track international trends. Sekhar has performed at numerous clubs across Kochi and is currently the resident DJ at Ava lounge in the Dream Hotel. He has chosen to remain in his hometown rather than relocate to larger nightlife markets, and aims to eventually open a local sound studio to produce music production and teach deejaying.

Sekhar has previously worked with Aashiq Abu in his offbeat blockbuster Salt N' Pepper, for which he did the official remix of rock band Avial's track "Aanakallan".

== Personal life ==
He married Maya on 16 January 2008 and have a daughter named Kaamaakhya born in March 2013. He also has another daughter named Maathangi born in August 2017. He currently resides in Eroor, Tripunitura with his mother, wife and children.

== Filmography ==
=== As actor ===
Year	Film	Role	Notes
2009	Ritu	DJ	Debut film, Cameo
2012	Da Thadiya	Luke John Prakash	Debut in Lead role
2013	Kadal Kadannoru Mathukkutty	Solomon	
2013	Camel Safari	James Kalarikkal	
2013	Ezhu Sundara Rathrikal	Vivek	
2013	Bicycle Thieves	Himself	Cameo
2014	Gangster	Anto Pandhare	
2014	Beware of Dogs	Omanakkuttan	
2015	100 Days of Love	Ummar	
2019	Ittymaani: Made in China	Achayan	Cameo
2019	Prathi Poovankozhi	Happymon	Rosamma's fiancée

== Discography ==
Year	Film/Album	Notes
2017	Parava	Background Score (Co-composed with Rex Vijayan, Yakzan Gary Pereira and Neha Nair)
2017	Mayaanadhi	Synths & Co-producer for song Uyirin Nadhiye with Rex Vijayan
2018	Break Journey	Background Score
2019	Nine	Background Score
2020	Kozhi Punk	Music Director
2022	Naaradan	Music Director
2022	03:00 AM	Music Director
2022	Chattambi	Music director
