= Mass Appeal India =

Indian record label

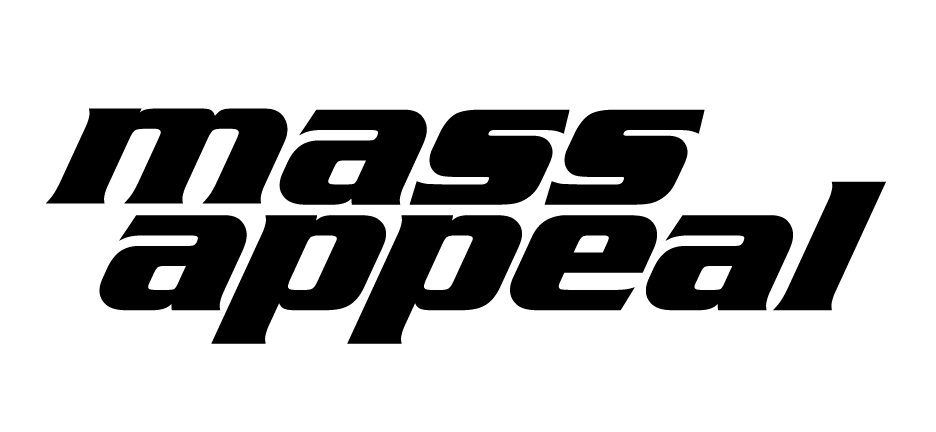
- Parent company: Mass Appeal Records
- Founded: 2019
- Distributors: Universal Music India (previously), The Orchard (current)
- Genre: Hip hop
- Country of origin: India
- Location: Mumbai

Mass Appeal India is an Indian record label. It is a subsidiary hip hop label of the American parent Mass Appeal Records. The label had partnered with The Orchard for music distribution.

== History ==
Mass Appeal India stated operating in August 2019 under partnership with the Universal Music India. The label first signed rapper Divine, and released his first three solo studio albums Kohinoor, Punya Paap, and Gunehgar, with a compilation album, Shutdown, all of whom were released in partnership with Divine's own label Gully Gang Entertainment. Artists like Shah Rule and the hip-hop quartet Aavrutti also released their projects under Gully Gang Entertainment in partnership with Mass Appeal India; Naya Zamana in 2020 and Hooked in 2021, respectively.

The label signed Raja Kumari in 2020. In 2022, the label terminated their partnership with the Universal Music India and formed a new music distribution agreement with The Orchard. In 2023, Mass Appeal India initiated signing Malayalam hip-hop artists through a program.

American musician KSHMR also released his Indian hip-hop oriented album Karam through Mass Appeal India, in partnership with his label Dharma Worldwide, which featured guest appearances from a plethora of Indian rappers like Seedhe Maut, Yashraj, Krsna, Raftaar, Ikka, Raja Kumari, Yungsta, Riar Saab, Munawar Faruqui, and MC STΔN.

In April 2025, Nas visited India again to perform at the Mass Appeal Presents: The World Reunion—A Charity Concert, hosted by Mass Appeal India, at The Nesco Center, in Mumbai. He was accompanied by various Indian-origin rappers, such as, Divine, Raftaar, Ikka, Krsna, King, and Steel Banglez. In the same year, Krsna announced his first mixtape, Yours Truly, which was released on 22 May 2025 and distributed via Mass Appeal India.

In January 2026, British-Punjabi folk singer Raf Saperra released his EP Venomz Vol.II, featuring guest appearances from Taj Aulakh, Bobby Kang and American rappers Ghostface Killah and Benny the Butcher. In 2026, Mumbai rapper Rare 78's video of him performing a freestyle in a cypher went viral, which prompted him to release it as a track, titled "Vastraa", on streaming platforms, through Mashooriya Originals, in partnership with Mass Appeal India. He became the first Hindi-language hip-hop artist from India to be featured in the magazine Complex.

== Artists ==
- ThirumaLi
- Divine
- Jass Manak
- Dabzee
- Vedan
- AP Dhillon
- KSHMR
- Heems
- The Ranjha
- Jaskaran
- Straight Outta Srinagar (SOS)

== Discography ==
=== Albums, mixtapes and EPs ===
Year	Artist(s)	Title	Ref
2019	Divine	Kohinoor	
2020	Ikka	I	
2020	Various Artists	Shutdown	
2020	Kidshot	Bhot Kuch	
2020	Divine	Punya Paap	
2020	Aavrutti	Naya Zamana	
2021	Shah Rule	Hooked	
2022	Ab 17, Sez on the Beat	Tez Filam	
2022	Divine	Gunehgar	
2023	Tsumyoki	A Message From The Moon	
2023	KSHMR	Karam	
2023	Dakait, Sez on the Beat	Dev Nagri Aur Main	
2023	yungsta, Sez on the Beat	Meen	
2024	Jaskaran	Divine Violence	
2024	Raf Saperra	5 Deadly Venomz	
2024	Nazz	Bathroom Singer	
2024	Divine, Karan Aujla	Street Dreams	
2024	Heems	Lafandar	
2025	Krsna	Yours Truly	
2025	Various Artists	The Lehar Chandigarh Mixtape	
2026	Raf Saperra	Venomz Vol.II	
