= Chithariyavar =

- Directed by: Lalji George
- Written by: M. K. Harikumar
- Screenplay by: G. R. Indugopan
- Produced by: V. K . S Devan; K. Jalal
- Starring: Sreenivasan; Mundoor Krishnankutty; Maya Maushmi
- Cinematography: K. G. Jayan
- Edited by: K. Rajagopal
- Music by: Johnson; Kureepuzha; C. J. Kuttappan (lyrics)
- Distributed by: Lilly Jim Films
- Release date: 31 December 2004
- Country: India
- Language: Malayalam

Chithariyavar (English: The Shattered) is a 2004 Indian film directed by Lalji George and written by M. K. Harikumar.

The film follows Viswanathan, a youth, who struggles within India's reservation system; instead of desiring to advance through his own merits. It portrays the need for the system of reservation in India for economically weaker communities, and those affected by the Caste System.

The title of the film means "the shattered", which echoes the protagonist's feelings toward the perceived limitations of the reservation system.

== Plot ==
Viswanathan is a postgraduate youth. His father, Kumaran struggles to earn a living through the traditional chat and Pujas, far removed from his son's educational aspirations. The reservation system in India guarantees positions to historically disadvantaged groups. When offered a position based on his poor background rather than his abilities, Viswanathan refuses. He struggles to rectify his own belief in his abilities with the seemingly meritless position offered; a struggle that worsens his feelings of inadequacy. The film explores the differences between the traditional work of the father and the educational job sought by the son, and merit-based advancement versus affirmative action.

== Production ==
Chithariyavar was filmed in Shornur Koonathura.

== Cast and crew ==
- Sreenivasan as Viswanathan
- Mundoor Krishnankutty as Kumaran
- Maya Maushmi as Reshma

== Music ==
Kureepuzha's poem Keezhalar is used as background score in the movie. The music is done by an Indian film-score composer and music director, Johnson. The folk songs in the movie are done by C. J. Kuttappan.
