= Vilayath Buddha =

2025 Malayalam film by Jayan Nambiar

- Theatrical release poster
- Directed by: Jayan Nambiar
- Screenplay by: G. R. Indugopan; Rajesh Pinnadan
- Based on: Vilayath Buddha by G. R. Indugopan
- Produced by: Sandip Senan; A. V. Anoop
- Starring: Prithviraj Sukumaran; Shammi Thilakan
- Cinematography: Arvind S. Kashyap; Renadive
- Edited by: Sreejith Sarang
- Music by: Jakes Bejoy
- Production companies: Urvasi Theatres; AVA Productions
- Release date: 21 November 2025
- Running time: 173 minutes
- Country: India
- Language: Malayalam
- Box office: ₹8.47 crore

Vilayath Buddha is a 2025 Indian Malayalam-language action drama film directed by Jayan Nambiar in his directorial debut. The film is based on the novel of the same name written by G. R. Indugopan. It is produced by Sandip Senan under the banner Urvasi Theatres, in association with Anish M. Thomas. It stars Prithviraj Sukumaran and Shammi Thilakan in the central roles, supported by Priyamvada Krishnan, Anu Mohan, Rajashree and Teejay Arunasalam.

The film adaptation of the novel was originally conceptualised by Sachy, who began its development in 2020. However, following his passing in June of that year, his associate Jayan Nambiar assumed responsibility for the project. Vilaayath Budha was officially announced in February 2021, with principal photography conducted extensively in Marayur between October 2022 and March 2025. The film features music composed by Jakes Bejoy, cinematography by Arvind S. Kashyap, and editing by Sreejith Sarang.

The film was theatrically released on 21 November 2025. It received mixed to negative reviews from critics and was a box office bomb.

== Plot ==
The film sets in Marayoor and revolves around two characters— Thoovella Bhaskaran Master and his protégé, a smuggler named Double Mohanan—both of whom are in conflict over the ownership of a sandalwood tree planted by the former.

== Cast ==
- Prithviraj Sukumaran as Mohanan aka Double Mohanan / Sandal Mohanan
  - Krishna Vijayachandran as Young Mohanan
- Shammi Thilakan as Thoovella Bhaskaran Master
- Priyamvada Krishnan as Cholaykkal Chaithanya
- Suraj Venjaramoodu as Surendran
- Anu Mohan as Anil Bhaskar, Bhaskran Master's son
- Rajashree as Cholaykkal Chembakam, Chaithanya's mother
- Teejay Arunasalam as Maari
- Dhruvan as SI Manikandan
- TSK as Mohanan's friend
- Pramod Veliyanadu
- Vinod Thomas

== Production ==
=== Development ===
The development of the film commenced in May 2020, when director Sachy announced his intention to adapt the novel Vilayath Buddha by G. R. Indugopan, noting that he was particularly drawn to the story. Indugopan explains in the novel that "Vilayath Buddha" refers to premium-grade sandalwood trees, which are used in the crafting of Buddha idols. Subsequently, Sachy started working on the script. He sought to make slight adjustments to the story to improve its cinematic appeal. Simultaneously, he was also working on the script of a film—a process that began in mid-March—featuring Prithviraj Sukumaran in the lead role. The project was set to be directed by his associate Jayan Nambiar, who would make his directorial debut. Nambiar served as an associate director in Sachy's Anarkali (2015) and Ayyappanum Koshiyum (2020).

Sachy intended to direct Vilayath Buddha after completing the script for Nambiar's film. However, the scripts remained incomplete due to his untimely demise in June of the same year. In late September, Nambiar announced that he would be directing Vilayath Buddha, with a screenplay jointly written by Indugopan and Rajesh Pinnadan. Prithviraj was brought on board to portray the lead character, Double Mohanan, with production planned post-COVID-19 pandemic. Nambiar told The Times of India that it was Prithviraj who suggested he take on this project, as they were unable to proceed with their previously planned venture.

On 7 February 2021, marking one year since the release of Sachy's final film Ayyappanum Koshiyum, Vilayath Buddha was officially announced by Prithviraj. The film would be produced under the banner of Urvasi Theatres. Jakes Bejoy was roped in to compose the music. Arvind S. Kashyap, noted for his work in 777 Charlie and Kantara (both 2022), would helm the cinematography, while Sreejith Sarang would serve as the editor. In an interview with The Times of India that month, Indugopan stated that the film would feature a different ending from that of the novel. In preparation for production, location scouting began in November in Marayur, the primary setting of the story.

=== Casting ===
The central characters of Indugopan's Vilayath Buddha are Bhaskaran Master, who has been growing a sandalwood tree in his yard for personal reasons, and his former student, Double Mohanan—a smuggler who defies his teacher and seeks to cut down the tree, known as the "Vilayath Buddha" for its high export value.

Prithviraj was signed to play the character Double Mohanan in September 2020. By then, the actor for Bhaskaran's role had also been finalised, though not publicly revealed. In November 2021, it was reported that Kottayam Ramesh, who was also part of Ayyappanum Koshiyum, would be portraying Bhaskaran Master. This was confirmed in October 2022, when production began. However, the team ultimately cast Shammi Thilakan as Bhaskaran, as revealed in a behind-the-scenes video released in January 2023. Priyamvada Krishnan would play the female protagonist. Anu Mohan was cast in a pivotal role. In March 2025, he revealed that his character was named Ani. Tamil actors Teejay Arunasalam and Rajashree were also signed to take on prominent roles, with the former playing the antagonist. Arunasalam was contacted by the assistant director of Vilayath Buddha following the COVID-19 lockdown to play the role of the antagonist, having been impressed by his performance in Asuran (2019). His character, Maari, speaks very little Malayalam and the majority of his dialogues are in Tamil. Arunasalam was also given the opportunity to write his own Tamil lines.

=== Filming ===
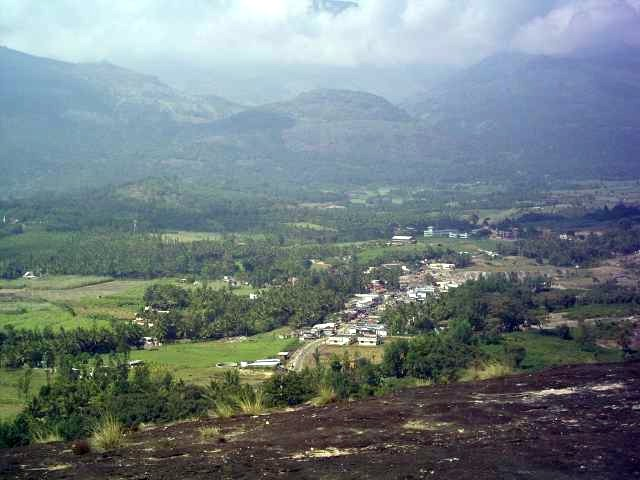
Marayur, where the film was extensively shot.

Principal photography of the film commenced on 19 October 2022. A pooja ceremony was conducted prior to the beginning of filming. The first schedule of the film took place in Marayur. Prithviraj joined the set two days later, as he was completing a two-day shoot for Gold (2022) in Dubai. The second schedule, held in Idukki, concluded on 13 December 2022, as announced by the cinematographer, Arvind S. Kashyap. Production shifted back to Marayur on 10 June 2023, for the final schedule, which was reportedly set to last almost 50 days. On the 25th of that month, Prithviraj incurred a ligament injury following a slip while jumping off a bus during the shoot of an action sequence.

Following the incident, he was admitted to VPS Lakeshore Hospital, a private hospital in Kochi, where he underwent a keyhole surgery the next day, along with treatment for the reconstruction and repair of cartilage, cruciate ligament, and meniscus injuries. Post-surgery, he engaged in a comprehensive physiotherapy regimen to support his recovery and was discharged three days later. Prithviraj was advised to take rest for a period of six weeks. After a gap of three months, he commenced preparations to begin the production of L2: Empuraan (2025), which was initially scheduled to start in August. The final schedule resumed on 8 December 2024, at Cheruthoni, following the completion of filming of L2: Empuraan. The critical scenes and action sequences were filmed during this schedule. On 2 March 2025, Prithviraj completed filming for his segments. Filming wrapped on 6 March.

== Music ==
Vilayath Budha

Soundtrack album by Jakes Bejoy
- Released: November 13, 2025
- Genre: Feature film soundtrack
- Length: 7m 34s

The music is composed by Jakes Bejoy, in his seventh collaboration with Prithviraj after Ranam (2018), Ayyappanum Koshiyum (2020), Kuruthi, Bhramam (both 2021), Kaduva and Kaapa (both 2022).

=== Tracklisting ===
No.	Title	Lyrics	Singer(s)	Length
1.	"Kaattu Raasa"	Vinayak Sasikumar, Mani Amudhavan, Ravi Varma	Vijay Yesudas, Parvathi Meenakshi	4:07
2.	"Kaattukkulle – Spirit of Marayoor"	Bhuvaneshwaran	Akhil J. Chand, Bhuvaneshwaran	3:27
Total length:				7:34

== Reception ==
The film received mixed to negative reviews. It was praised for its performances and ambition but criticized for its execution.

The Hindu noted that “mass masala aspirations undermine a film with a compelling core.”

The Times of India said it was “interesting premise, but … with battling male egos at its crux and the massy elements, it feels a bit ‘more of the same’.”

The Indian Express wrote that the film “shows why not everything shot should make the final cut.”

Onmanorama described the film as a “strongly compelling ride,” highlighting the tension among characters.

India Today called it “a mass action thriller set in Kerala’s sandalwood world,” praising its raw energy.

The Week wrote that Prithviraj Sukumaran and Shammi Thilakan “ensure a strongly compelling ride.”

== Controversy ==
Shortly after the release of Vilayath Buddha, its producer filed a complaint alleging that a YouTube review channel launched a coordinated cyber-attack against the film. He claimed the channel misrepresented the film's content, targeted the cast and crew personally, and incited communal and political polarisation under the guise of review.

The producer further alleged that the video appeared “within 48 hours” of release, causing significant financial loss and potential social harm. A formal case was registered by the police against the channel.
