= How Is That for a Monday? =

- Directed by: Sripal Sama
- Written by: Sripal Sama; Sai Praneeth Gouravaraju
- Produced by: Sripal Sama
- Starring: Kaushik Ghantasala; Satya Yamini
- Cinematography: Rahul Biruly
- Edited by: Raghavender Vuppuganti
- Music by: Dawn Vincent
- Production company: Nizam Talkies
- Distributed by: PVR Cinemas
- Release date: 27 October 2023
- Running time: 88 minutes
- Country: India

How Is That For a Monday? is a 2023 English–Telugu independent film directed and produced by Sripal Sama under Nizam Talkies production house. Sama also co-wrote the film with Sai Praneeth Gravari. It stars Kaushik Ghantasala as main lead while the other cast include Keegan Guy, Megan Barlow, Satya Yamini, Lester Latham and Candido Carter. This film was screened at Santa Monica International Film Festival and 19th Chennai International Film Festival. The film revolves around the lives of an immigrant, a billionaire, an elder man and a gang of amateur thieves.

== Release ==
=== Theatrical ===
How is that for a Monday? was screened at Regal LA LIVE theater in Los Angeles, United States, on 16 October 2023, as part of 13th Awareness Film Festival. It was distributed by PVR Cinemas and was released in India on 27 October 2023.

=== Home media ===
The digital rights of How is that for a Monday? were acquired by ETV Win and the film became available for streaming from 7 December 2023.

== Reception ==
Ram Venkat Srikar of Film Companion wrote "HITFAM is a testament that a simple, good-hearted story, when presented with a clean screenplay and control over craft, can make for a compelling watch and move you. One doesn't always need lavish resources at their disposal and heavy-weight drama to keep the viewer invested" in his review.

Sangeetha Devi Dundoo of The Hindu wrote "The aftereffects of this film might make you read up on Jesse Owens. Like Shyam, we may also learn to acknowledge the bigger picture as we get caught up in day-to-day hustles. Perhaps, we will also learn not to snap at customer care executives who reiterate, even if annoyingly, that they apologize for any inconvenience caused." and praised the performance of main lead Kaushik Ghantsala.

Abhilasha Cherukuri of Cinema Express rated the film 3.5 out of 5 and wrote "How’s that for a Monday? has two halves. One comes with a set of short film-style satisfactions, where the co-incidences line up in a way that makes the viewer cognizant of writing done well. The other meanders around with philosophical outtakes before an elegant touchdown that places the joy of an active conscience over the contentments of material comfort."
