= M80 Moosa =

- Opening sequence
- Genre: Comedy-Drama
- Developed by: Essem Shaseer; Reisal Illikkal
- Written by: N.P Sajeesh; Jeo Baby; K Renjith; Favour Francis
- Directed by: Shaji Azeez
- Starring: Vinod Kovoor; Surabhi Lakshmi; Anju Sasi; Athul Sreeva
- Opening theme: M80 Moosa by Benti
- Country of origin: India
- Original language: Malayalam
- No. of seasons: 1
- No. of episodes: 350

Production
- Producer: N.P Sajeesh
- Production location: Kerala
- Camera setup: Multi-camera
- Running time: 23 minutes approx

Original release
- Network: Media One TV
- Release: 4 January 2014 – 2017

M80 Moosa is an Indian comedy series which launched on Media One TV, starring Vinod Kovoor & Surabhi Lakshmi as main protagonists. M80 Moosa was one of the leading series on Media One TV channel, until stopping its broadcast in 2017.

== Plot & Timing ==
The show was based on the current issues in Kerala that effect the life of a fish monger & his family who live in the city of Kozhikode. The show had been broadcast on Media One TV at 8.30 PM (IST) every Saturday & Sunday.

== Cast ==
=== Main cast ===
- Vinod Kovoor as M80 Moosa
- Surabhi Lakshmi as Pathu/Fathima C.M./Pathumma
- Anju Sasi as Rasiya Moosa
- Athul Sreeva as Rizwan Moosa
- C.T. Kabeer as Shukoor C.M.
- Sreejith Kaiveli Pokkan as Susheelan
- K. T. C. Abdullah as Narikkuniyil Mamad Haji

=== Recurring cast ===
- Prathapan Nellikkathara
- Rama Devi
- Vineetha
- Sasheendra Varma

=== New Cast ===
- Balan Parakkal as Ambujakshan
- Vijayan Karanthoor as Member
- Kozhikode Sarada as Kadeesumma

=== Former Cast ===
- Ibrahim Kutty as Balan T.M
- Chembil Ashokan as Joseph/Oussepettan
- Appunni Sasi as Sugunan
