= Surabhi Lakshmi =

Indian actress

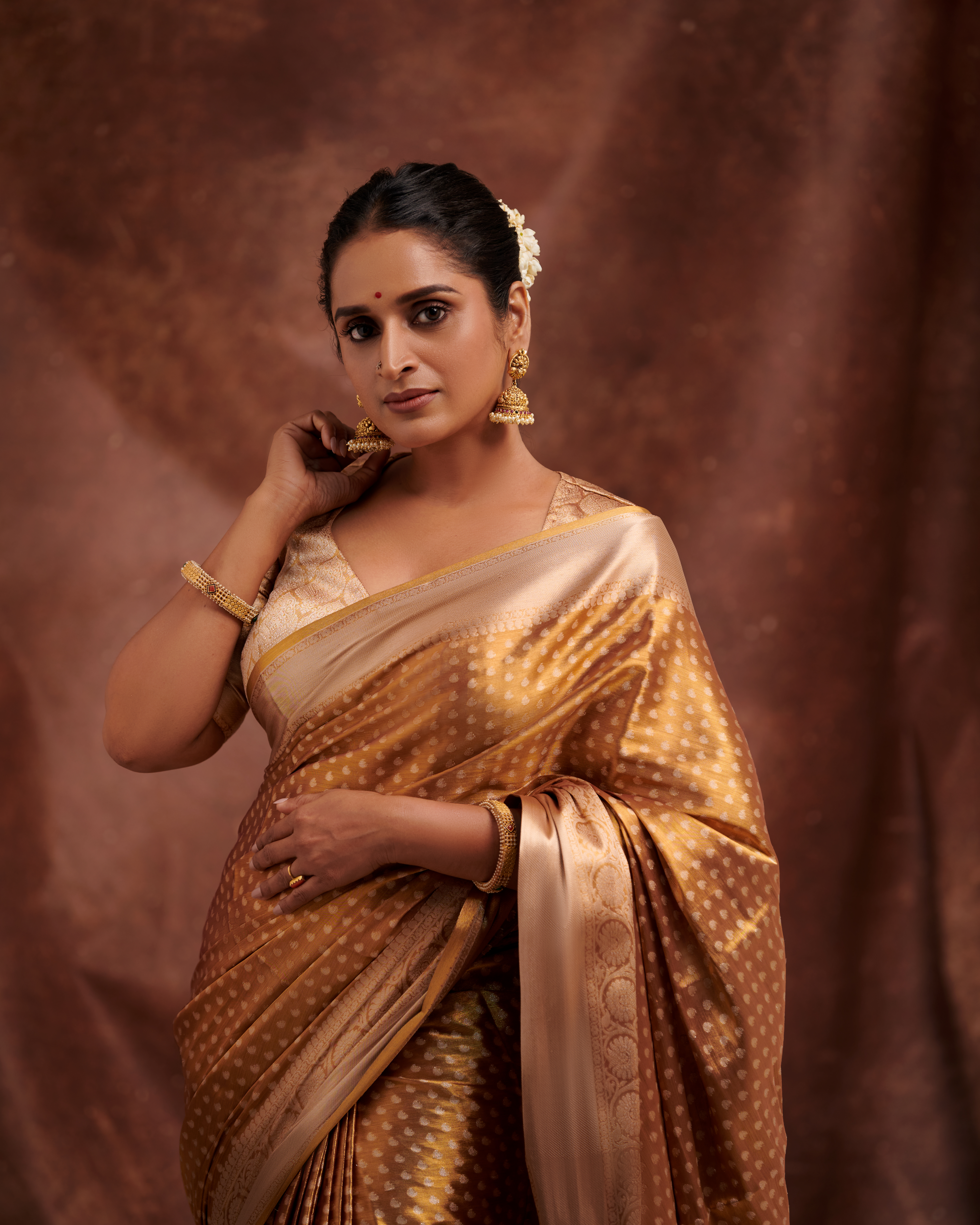
- Born: Surabhi C. M. 16 November 1986 (age 40); Narikkuni, Kozhikode, Kerala, India
- Education: Masters in Theatre Arts
- Alma mater: MG University; Sree Sankaracharya University of Sanskrit
- Occupation: Actor
- Years active: 2005–present
- Awards: National Film Award for Best Actress (2016)
- Website: www.surabhilakkshmi.com

Surabhi C. M., also known as Surabhi Lakshmi, is an Indian film, television, and stage actress who appears in Malayalam films and television. She won the National Film Award for Best Actress in 2016 for portraying the role of a struggling middle-aged mother in the Malayalam film Minnaminungu.

She is known for the role as Pathu through the Malayalam Comical Television Series M80 Moosa which launched on Media One TV.

== Personal life ==
Surabhi was born on 16 November 1986 to parents Aandy and Radha. She is from Narikkuni, Kozhikode, Kerala. She earned a Bachelor of Arts (BA) degree in Bharatanatyam, securing first rank from Sree Sankaracharya University of Sanskrit, Kalady. Surabhi also completed a Master of Arts (MA) degree in Theatre arts from the same university and a Master of Philosophy in Performing arts from Mahatma Gandhi University. As of 2017, she is pursuing a Ph.D. in Performing Arts at Sree Sankaracharya University of Sanskrit.

== Career ==
In 2008, Surabhi won the reality show Best Actor on Amrita TV.

She received the National Film Award for Best Actress at the 64th National Film Awards, along with a special jury mention at the Kerala State Film Awards 2016 and the Malayalam Film Critics Award 2016 for Second Best Actress, all for her role in the film Minnaminungu.

== Directorial debut ==
In 2019, Surabhi made her directorial debut with Kaumaaram, the second stage in the Malayalam music album series Pennaal. The series portrays five stages in a woman's life, and Kaumaaram focuses on adolescence, capturing the emotional evolution and innocence of a young girl. Pennaal is also noted for its all-women creative team, with women leading the project across lyrics, composition, direction, and performance.

== Filmography ==
=== Films ===
Year	Title	Role	Notes
2005	By the People	Nalini	Debut film
2008	Thirakkatha	Valarmathi	
2008	Pakal Nakshatrangal	Geetha	
2008	Kancheepurathe Kalyanam	Athira	
2008	Gulmohar	Nirmala	
2009	Puthiya Mukham	Roshni	
2010	Katha Thudarunnu	TV Reporter	
2011	Shankaranum Mohananum	Malini	
2011	The Train	Allu's mother	
2011	Swapna Sanchari	Radha	
2012	Ivan Megharoopan	Kousalya	
2012	Ayalum Njanum Thammil	Dead Kid's mother	
2012	Thalsamayam Oru Penkutty	Jenny	
2012	Banking Hours 10 to 4	Priya Lal	
2012	Namukku Parkkan	Maya	
2012	Njanum Ente Familiyum	Clara	
2013	Housefull	Mercy	
2013	Black Butterfly	Ramani	
2013	ABCD: American-Born Confused Desi	Seenamol	
2013	Ezhu Sundara Rathrikal	Jayalakshmi	
2013	Papilio Buddha	Krishna	
2014	Vaayai Moodi Pesavum; Samsaram Aarogyathinu Haanikaram	Arguing wife	Tamil-Malayalam bilingual film
2014	Odum Raja Aadum Rani	Thamburu's wife	
2014	On The Way	Mercy	
2014	Bhoomiyude Avakashikal	Menon's wife	
2014	Vasanthathinte Kanal Vazhikalil	Chirutha	
2014	Njan Steve Lopez	Shobha	
2015	Love Land	Raji	
2015	Iruvazhi Thiriyunnidam	-	
2015	Vidooshakan	-	
2015	Kannadi Talkies		
2015	Ennu Ninte Moideen	Maniyamma	
2015	Utopiayile Rajavu	Zaira	
2015	Thilothama	Sr.Mary Lilly	
2016	Kismath	Saleena	
2016	Kappiri Thuruthu	Rukhiya	
2016	Dheeksha		
2017	Comrade In America	Deepa	Guest Appearance
2017	Minnaminungu (The Firefly)	Mother	First film as Female lead
2017	Till the Last Breath	Rose	
2017	Teaching Note	Radha teacher	
2017	Oru Visheshapetta BiriyaniKissa	Amina	
2017	Chippy	-	
2018	Daivame Kaithozham K. Kumar Akanam	Betty	
2018	Eeda	Pushpalatha	
2018	Sakhavinte Priyasakhi	Paathu	
2018	Theevandi	Secretary Vishalam	
2018	Ennaalum Sarath..?	Abhishtta Lekshmi (DYSP)	
2019	Oru Onnannara Pranayakatha	Premalatha Kalamandalam	
2019	Neeyum Njanum	Subadra Antharjanam	
2019	Athiran	Vadakkedath Kamala Lakshmi	
2019	Mera Naam Shaji	Surabhi Shaji	
2019	Vikruthi	Elsy	
2019	Ulta	Gauri	
2019	Chachaji	Sreedevi	
2021	Kurup	Maniyamma	
2021	Thala	Muthu	
2022	Kallan D’Souza	Asha	
2022	Padma	Padma	
2022	Kuri	Betsy	
2022	Kumari	Muthamma	
2022	Paykappal	Neeli	
2023	Valatty	Mother dog (voice)	
2024	Manorathangal	Beevathu; Sita	Segment:Olavum Theeravum; Segment: Swargam Thurakkuna Samayam
2024	ARM	Manikyam	
2024	Rifle Club	Susan	
2025	Get-Set Baby	Sujatha	
2026	Aval	Prabha	
TBA	Poriveyil †	Lalitha	
TBA	Jwalamukhi †	Angel	
TBA	Anuradha Crime Number 59/2019 †	Parvathy	

=== Short films ===
Year	Film	Role
2015	Mask	Jeena
2016	Hunthrappy Bussatto	Kulsu
2018	Garbhapoothi	Shalini
2020	Niqab	Muslim lady

=== Television ===
Year	Show	Channel	Role	Ref.
	Kathayile Rajakumari	Mazhavil Manorama	Sona Sreekumar	
	Amma Ammayiyamma	Kairali TV	Host	
2014-2017	M80 Moosa	Media One	Paathu/Fathima	
2016	Luckymonte Ezham Thiruvonam	Asianet	Telefilm	
2016	Laughing Villa	Surya TV	Suru/PA	
2017	Laughing Villa Season 2	Surya TV	Mentor	
2018	Angadipattu	Media One	Shalini	
2020	Comedy Masters	Amrita TV	Judge	
2024	Star Magic	Flowers TV	Guest	
2024	Enkile Ennodu Para	Asianet	Contestant	

=== Theater performance ===
Year	Drama	Ref.
2010	Yakshikathakalum Naattuvarthamanangalum	
2017	Bombay Tailors	

== Awards ==
Year	Award	Category	Movie/TV Show	Role	Ref.
2008	Amrita TV Channel	Best Actress	Best Actor		
2010	Kerala Sangeetha Nataka Academy	Best Actress	Yakshikathakalum Naattuvarthamanangalum		
2010	Santhadevi Puraskaaram	Best Actress	Yakshikathakalum Naattuvarthamanangalum		
2010	Abudhabi Theatre Festival Award	Best Actress	Yakshikathakalum Naattuvarthamanangalum		
2012	Sabarmathi Award	Best Actress	Kathayile Rajakumari	Sona Sreekumar	
2015	Media One Channel Award	Star of the Channel	M80 Moosa	Paathu	
2016	Padmarajan Puraskaaram (Short films)	Best Actress	Dheeksha		
2016	Flowers TV Awards	Best Actress - Comedy	M80 Moosa	Paathu	
2017	National Film Awards	National Film Award for Best Actress	Minnaminungu	Mother	
2017	Vayalar Ramavarma Award	Best Actress	Minnaminungu	Mother	
2017	Kerala Film Critics Award	Second Best Actress	Minnaminungu	Mother	
2017	Kerala State Film Awards	Special Mention	Minnaminungu	Mother	
2017	Kerala Sangeetha Nataka Academy	Best Actress	Bombay Tailors (Drama)	Muthu Mani	
2021	Kerala Film Critics Association Awards	Best Actress	Jwalamukhi	Angel	
