= Oru Thekkan Thallu Case =

2022 Indian film

- First look poster
- Directed by: Sreejith. N
- Screenplay by: Rajesh Pinnadan
- Story by: G. R. Indugopan
- Based on: Ammini Pilla Vettu Case by G. R. Indugopan
- Produced by: Mukesh R. Mehta; Sunil A. K.; C. V. Sarathi
- Starring: Biju Menon; Roshan Mathew; Padmapriya; Nimisha Sajayan
- Narrated by: Aswath Lal
- Cinematography: Madhu Neelakandan
- Edited by: Manoj Kannoth
- Music by: Justin Varghese
- Production companies: E4 Entertainment; New Surya Films; Open Book Productions
- Release date: 8 September 2022
- Running time: 152 minutes
- Country: India
- Language: Malayalam

Oru Thekkan Thallu Case (transl. A southern brawl case) is a 2022 Indian Malayalam-language action comedy film directed by Sreejith N (in his directorial debut) and written by Rajesh Pinnadan, based on the short story Ammini Pilla Vettu Case by G. R. Indugopan. The film stars Biju Menon, Roshan Mathew, Padmapriya, and Nimisha Sajayan. The film is produced by Mukesh R. Mehta, Sunil A. K., and C. V. Sarathi.

The film marked Padmapriya's comeback to a Malayalam film after a gap of five years. The film was released on 8 September 2022. It received positive reviews upon release and turned out to be a moderate success.

== Plot ==
Set in late 1980s, Podiyan Pillai's lover, Vasanthi, and Ammini Pillai's wife, Rukmini, are neighbors and close friends. Ammini is one of the most respected person in town. One night, Podiyan visits Vasanthi; Ammini spots him and slaps him. Podiyan is enraged and attacks Ammini in the dark with his friends, cutting him and leaving him bedridden for a couple of months. To teach Podiyan and his friends a lesson in a publicly acknowledged way, Ammini decides to take matters into his own hands. Podiyan and his friends are humiliated when Ammini chooses not to file a lawsuit but instead deals with things personally. They are uncertain how to handle the crisis and seek to avoid Ammini's wrath. Ammini exacts revenge on Podiyan's friends one by one. Meanwhile, Vasanthi discovers she is pregnant before her upcoming wedding to Podiyan. The couple flee to a hideout, where Podiyan is supplied with necessities by his friends. Even though Ammini has not yet slapped Podiyan, Rukmini insists that the wedding be held as soon as possible. Just before the wedding, while Ammini is in the lighthouse, Rukmini and Podiyan lock him inside. The moment Rukmini realises that she has made the wrong decision, she tries to open the door, but it is locked. Ammini jumps out of the lighthouse window to escape and breaks his arm. On the wedding day, Rukmini avenges her husband by slapping Podiyan, as Ammini is present. The film ends with Podiyan and his friends in a car heading towards the wall where Ammini has crossed off their names upon slapping them. Ammini is standing there with Podiyan's name still not crossed off, leaving the film on a cliffhanger.

== Cast ==
- Biju Menon as Ammini Pillai
- Roshan Mathew as Podiyan Pillai
- Padmapriya as Rukmini, Ammini's wife
- Nimisha Sajayan as Vasanthi, Podiyan's girlfriend turned wife
- Akhil Kavalayoor as Kunjukunju
- Aswath Lal as Lopez
- Reju Sivadas as Prabhakkuttan
- Arun Pavumpa as Kunjipakki
- Azeez Nedumangad
- Pramod Veliyanad as Astrologer
- Prasanth Murali
- Achuthananthan
- Sasi Valooran
- Neeraja Rajendran as Vasanthi's mother
- Jayaraj

== Production ==
On 14 July 2021, Biju Menon announced that his next film would be Oru Thekkan Thallu Case and released the film's first-look graphic poster featuring the four pivotal characters. On 10 November 2021, Nimisha Sajayan informed that the principal photography of the film would start soon. In February 2022, the crew announced that the shooting of the film was completed.

== Soundtrack ==
The music of the film is composed by Justin Varghese.

No.	Title	Lyrics	Music	Singer(s)	Length
1.	"Yentharu"	Anvar Ali	Justin Varghese	Himna Hilari, Justin Varghese	3:29
2.	"Prema Neyyapam"	Anvar Ali	Justin Varghese	Justin Varghese	5:10
Total length:					8:39

== Release ==
=== Theatrical ===
Oru Thekkan Thallu Case was released in theatres on 8 September 2022.
