= G. R. Indugopan =

Indian writer and director (born 1974)

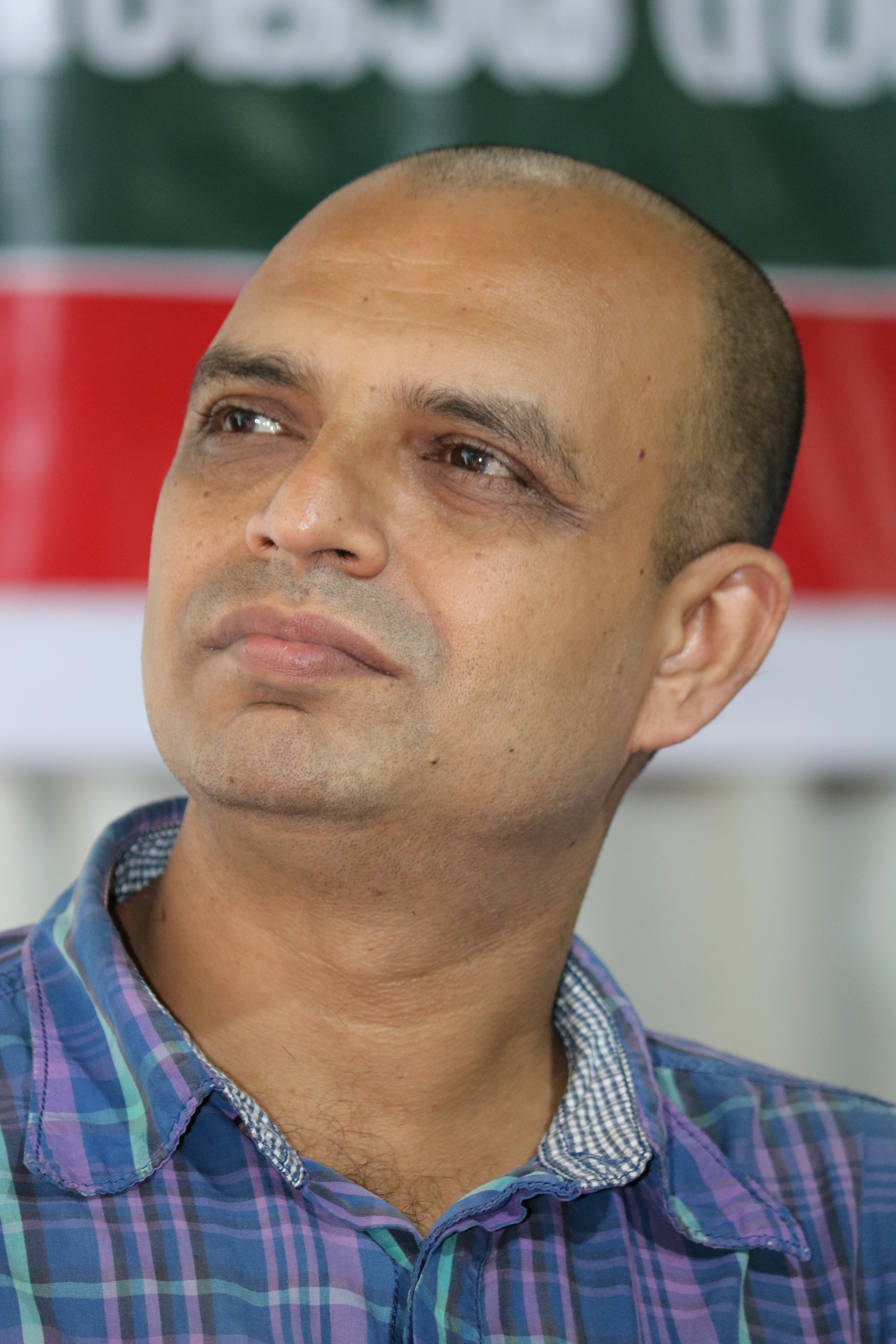
- G. R. Indugopan in 2019
- Born: 19 April 1974 (age 52); Valathungal, Kollam district, Kerala, India
- Education: BA English Language & Literature
- Alma mater: SN College, Kollam
- Occupations: Journalist, writer, screenwriter and director
- Writing career
- Period: 2004 – present
- Notable awards: Abu Dabi Shakthi; Kumkumam Award; Ashan Prize

G. R. Indugopan, is an Indian screenwriter, director and a writer of Malayalam literature. Known as one of the post-modern writers of Malayalam, Indugopan is the director of the 2007 Malayalam movie, Ottakkayyan, and has published several books which include novels, short story anthologies, memoirs and travelogue.

== Biography ==
Indugopan was born to Gopinatha Pillai and Radhayamma on 19 April 1974 at Valathungal, in Kollam district of the south Indian state of Kerala.

Ice-196^{0}C, a novel by Indugopan based on nanotechnology and published by DC books, is reported to be the first technology novel in Malayalam. His other works include a two novel edition, Cheenkanni Vettakkarante Athmakathayum Muthala Layaniyum, Manaljeevikal, dealing with the mineral sand mining areas of Kollam Chavara area, and Iruttu Pathradhipar, short story anthology. He is a recipient of several awards such as Abu Dhabi Sakthi Award (2017, for the story Kollappatti Daya), Kumkumam Award, and Ashan Prize.

Indugopan wrote the script of Chithariyavar, a Malayalam movie featuring Sreenivasan and directed by Lalji. His debut as a director was with Ottakkayyan, a 2007 film. His novel, Kali Gandhaki, was made into a tele-series by Madhupal which had its screen-play written by P. F. Mathews.

Indugopan is a senior sub editor of Malayala Manorama daily and lives in Thiruvananthapuram, Kerala.

== Bibliography ==
=== Novels ===
- G. R. Indugopan (2008). Thaskaran Maniyanpillayude Aathmakatha. DC Books. p. 400. ISBN 9788126420049.
- G. R. Indugopan (2009). Bhoomi Smasanam. Sign Books. p. 124.
- G. R. Indugopan (2011). Kallan Bakki Ezhuthumpol. DC Books. p. 96. ISBN 978-8126431359.
- G. R. Indugopan (2011). Ajayande Ammaye Konnatharu. Poorna Publications. p. 108. ISBN 9788130012773.
- G. R. Indugopan (2012). Ice -196^{0}C. DC Books. p. 248. ASIN B007E4Y7C2.
- G. R. Indugopan (2012). Dutch Bungalowile Pretharahasyam. DC Books. p. 159. ISBN 978-8126434527.
- G. R. Indugopan (2012). Vellimoonga. Jnaneswari Publications. p. 144. ISBN 978-9380178271.
- G. R. Indugopan (2013). Manaljeevikal. Chintha Publishers. p. 176. ISBN 978-9382808060.
- G. R. Indugopan (2013). Cheenganni Vettakkarante Aathmakathayum Muthala Layiniyum. Chintha Publications. p. 300. ISBN 9789383155644.
- G. R. Indugopan (2013). Kodiyadayalam : Kudiyettathinte Reverse. Lead Books. p. 130.
- G. R. Indugopan (2014). Kali Gandaki. DC Books. p. 199. ISBN 978-8126450763.
- G. R. Indugopan (Colachel Mu. Yoosuf-translator) (2015). Thirudan Manianpillai (Tamil ed.). Kalachuvadu Publications. p. 1132. ASIN B071CX1WQV.
- G. R. Indugopan (2018). Panthukalikkaran. DC Books. p. 204. ISBN 9789352823581.
- G. R. Indugopan (2018). Amminippilla Vettu Case. Mathrubhumi Books. p. 110. ISBN 9788182676350.
- G. R. Indugopan (2020). Vilayath Buddha. Mathrubhumi Books. p. 128. ISBN 978-9390234417.
- G. R. Indugopan (2023). Hanno (Based on book 'POPE'S ELEPHANT'by Silvio Bedini). DC Books.

=== Novellas ===
Year	Title	Title in English	Publisher
2012	Rakthaniramulla Orange	Orange With The Color Of Blood	Kottayam: DC Books
2013	Rathriyiloru Cyclewala	Cyclewala In Night	Kottayam: DC Books
2018	Ottakkalulla Pretham	Loner Ghost	Chintha Publications

=== Short story anthologies ===
Year	Title	Title in English	Publisher
2001	Iruttu Pathradhipar	Darker Newspaper Editors	Kottayam: DC Books
2017	Kollappatti Daya	Kollappatti Daya	Kottayam: DC Books

=== Memoirs ===
Year	Title	Title in English	Publisher
2017	Water Body: Vellam Kondulla Athmakatha	Water Body: Autobiography With Water	Chintha Publishers

=== Travelogue ===
Year	Title	Title in English	Publisher
2018	Russian Yuvathwathinoppam	With Russian Youths	Kottayam: DC Books

== Adaptations ==
- "Chennaya" is a novel published in 2021 were GR Indugopan's first book-to-screen adaptation. The film is directed by Shaji Azeez and is titled Wolf, with the screenplay written by the author himself.

- 2022 released film Oru Thekkan Thallu Case is directed by Sreejith.N and written by Rajesh Pinnadan, based on the 2018 novel "Ammini Pillai Vettu Case."
- Under the direction of "Shaji Kailas", Indugopan wrote the script for the film Kaapa, based on the short story "Shankhumukhi" from the gangster crime novel "Padinjarekollam Chorakaalam."

- Ponman is the film version of Indu Gopan's own book, "Naalanchu Cheruppakkar", with the screenplay written by him and Justin Mathew. It also marks the directorial debut of Jothish Shankar.

- Vilayath Buddha is a film adaptation of the novel "Vilayat Buddha," one of Indu Gopan's notable works, published in 2020. After the huge success of Ayyappanum Koshiyum, director Sachy had a plan to film the story. After his untimely death, it was debut directed by his own assistant Jayan Nambiar, and features Prithviraj Sukumaran and Shammi Thilakan in the main leads and the screenplay is written by Rajesh Pinnadan and Indu Gopan himself.

== Filmography ==
Year	Work	Director	Contribution	Notes
2004	Chithariyavar	Lalji George	Screenplay	Debut film as a Screenwriter
2007	Ottakkayyan	Himself	Screenplay, Direction	Debut as a Director
2013	Up & Down: Mukalil Oralundu	T. K. Rajeev Kumar	Screenplay	Screenplay written with Sunny Joseph & Manuel George
2021	Wolf	Shaji Azeez	Screenplay	Adaptation of short story Chennaya
2022	Oru Thekkan Thallu Case	Sreejith N.	Story	Adaptation of short story Ammini Pilla Vettu Case
2022	Kaapa	Shaji Kailas	Screenplay	Adaptation of short story Shankumukhi
2023	Christy	Alvin Henry	Screenplay	Screenplay written with Benyamin
2025	Ponman	Jothish Shankar	Screenplay	Adaptation of novel Naalanchu cheruppakkar
2025	Vilayath Buddha	Jayan Nambiar	Screenplay	Adaptation of novel Vilayath Buddha Screenplay written with Rajesh Pinnadan
