= O. Abdurahman =

Indian journalist and author

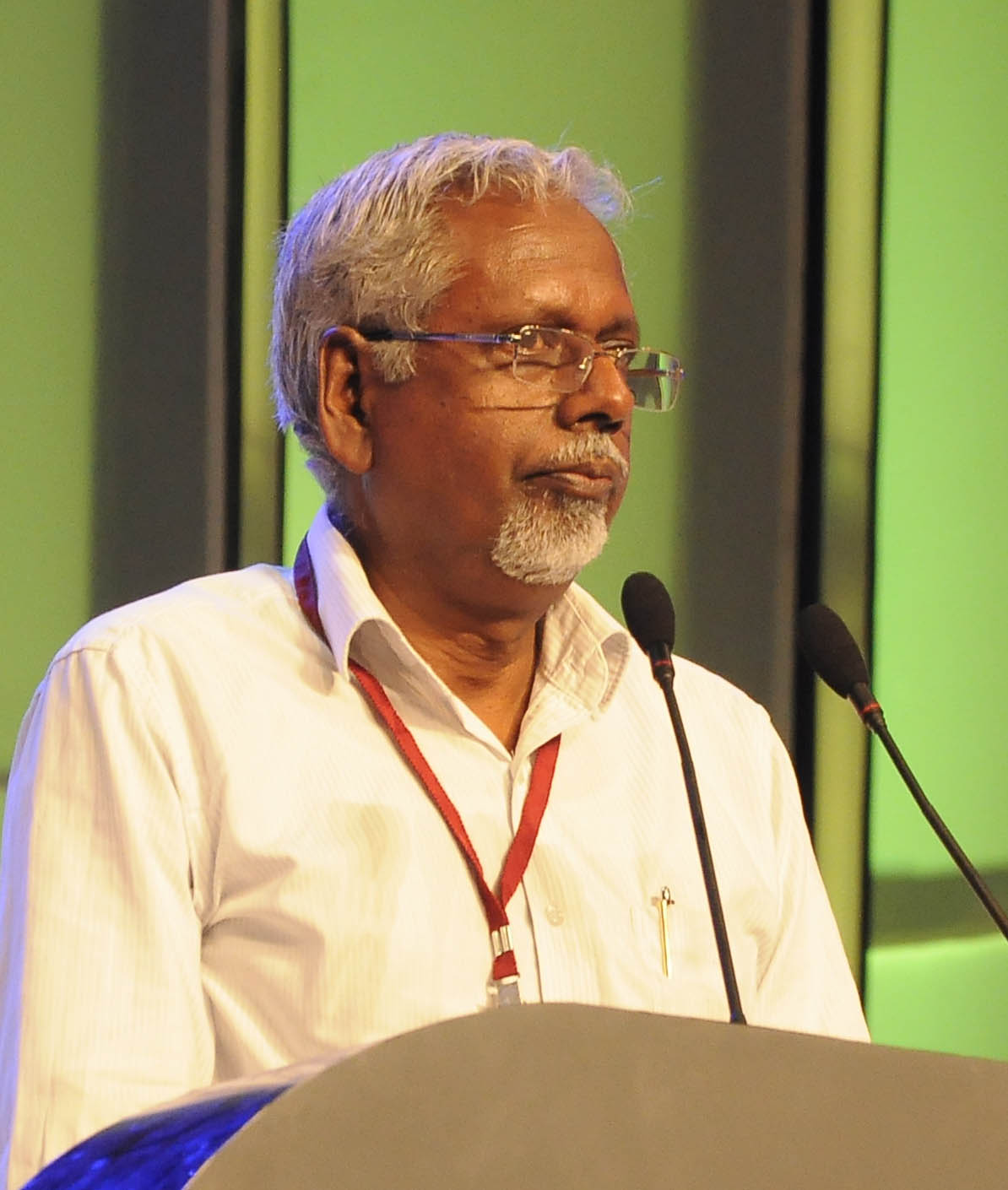
- Abdurahman in a public meeting.
- Occupations: Journalist, author

O. Abdurahman is an Indian journalist and author from Kerala. He is the group editor of Madhyamam Daily-Mediaone, and has authored books on Islam and issues facing the Muslim community in India.

== Early life ==
He did his initial studies at Al Madrasathul Islamiya Chennamangalore (1960–64) and Shanthapuram Islamiya college. Later he moved to Qatar and pursued his higher studies at the Al Ma'had ul Deen, Qatar University, Qatar (1972–74). He then moved back to India and joined the Chennamagalore Islahiya College as its Principal in 1982. noted author and media person Mr. O Abdulla is his elder brother.

== Public life ==
=== Journalist and orator ===
Abdurrahman is the editor of Madhyamam Daily, a Malayalam newspaper. He was the editor of Prabodhanam weekly during the period 1964–72. He writes on Islam, minority politics, communal politics, education and media in various periodicals, journals and magazines. Abdulrahman is an activist of Jamaat-e-Islami Hind who is known for his speeches on different topics at various seminars, public meetings. He is a member of Board of Studies, Journalism Department, University of Calicut and General Council, Kerala Press Academy.

=== Social and educational activist ===
He was a member of Kerala Government Arabic Textbook Committee. He served as a member of the 15-member expert committee led by Dr. KN Panikker to advise the Government on the controversial Seventh Standard Social Sciences Textbook syllabus.
