= Pennaal (music series) =

Indian music series

"Baalyam"
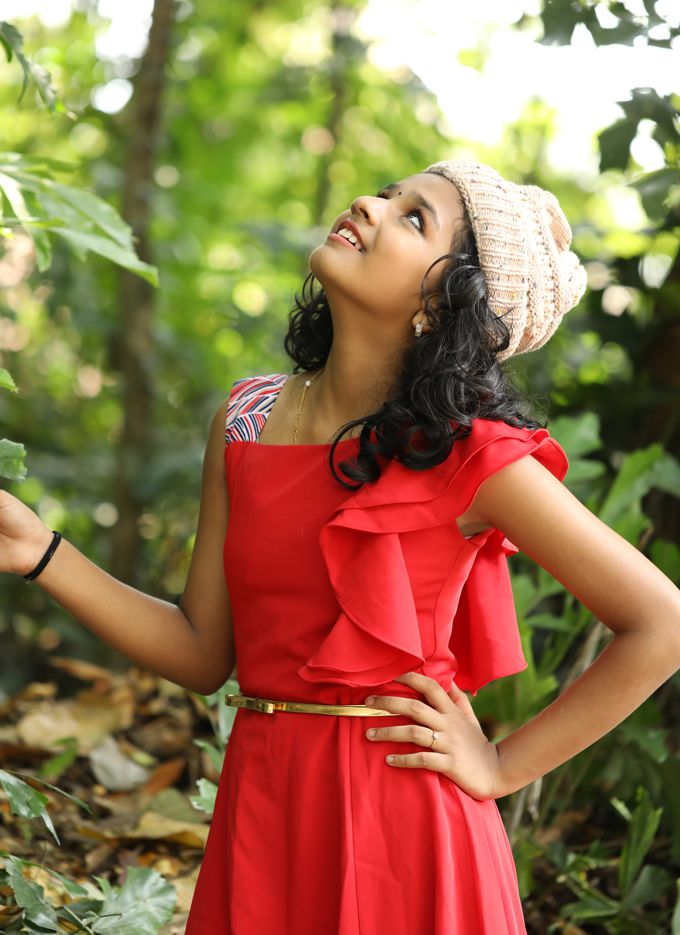
- Sreya, the child singer of Baalyam

Song by Sreya Jayadeep
- Released: March 3, 2019
- Songwriter: Shyla Thomas
- Composer: Gayathri Suresh
- Lyricist: Shyla Thomas

Music video
- Baalyam on YouTube

Pennaal (Malayalam: പെണ്ണാൾ), meaning "The Woman," is also the title of a Malayalam music series that features five songs, each depicting a different stage in a woman's life - childhood, adolescence, youth, motherhood, and old age. The series was conceptualized by Shyla Thomas, a lyricist, media person, and technology entrepreneur, with contributions from Dr. Shani Hafees, a lyricist, author, entrepreneur and an Ayurveda doctor. Pennaal is noted as the first music series in Malayalam created entirely by women, and it explores various emotional and societal aspects of womanhood.

== Stage 1 - Baalyam (ബാല്യം) Childhood ==
The first song, 'Baalyam', was sung by well-known child artist Sreya Jayadeep and was released on March 3, 2019, in connection with International Women's Day. The song, filmed in Kozhikode and surrounding areas, features Sreya herself on screen.

Basic Information - Stage One - Baalyam

Lyrics	Shyla Thomas
Singer & Artist	Sreya Jayadeep
Music	Gayathri Suresh
DOP	Chinnu Kuruvilla & Sumesh Sukumaran
Programming	Jecin George
Mixing & Mastering	Renjith Rajan
Released by	M.Jayachandran (Music Director)
Release date	3 March 2019
Song Link	Pennaal on YouTube

== Stage 2 - Kaumaaram (കൗമാരം) Adolescence ==
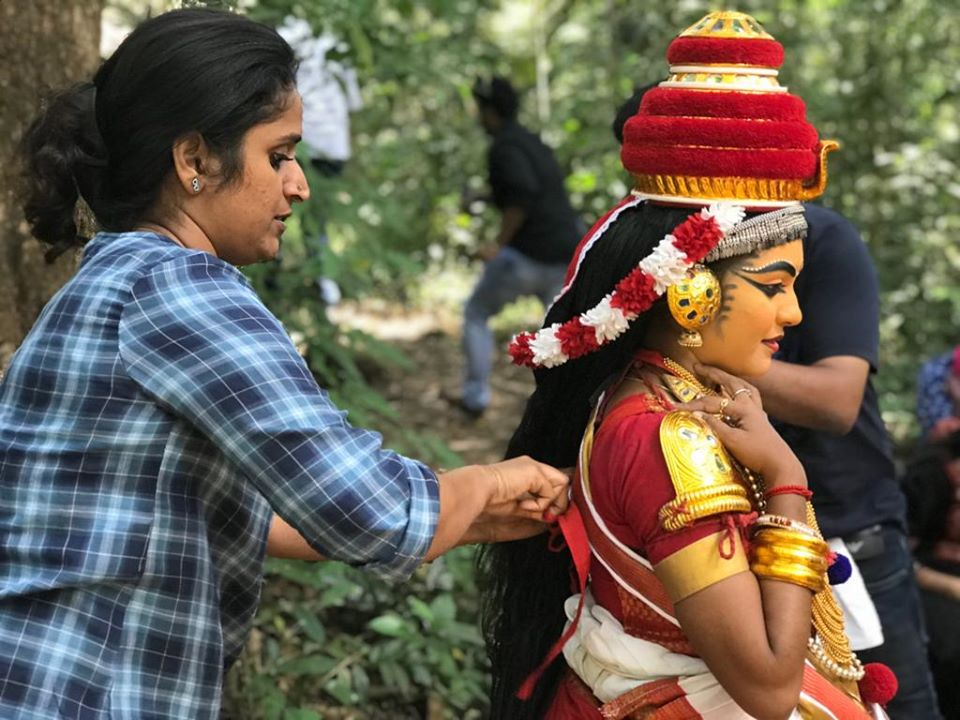
Surabhi gets artist ready at the location of Kaumaaram

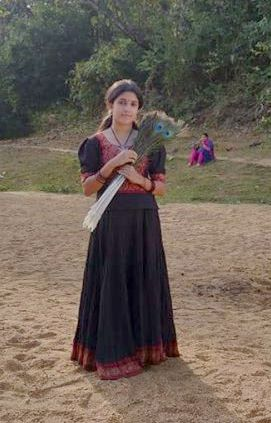
Meenakshi Binish, plays the lead role in Kaumaaram

After Baalyam, Kaumaaram (Adolescence) was released on July 26, 2019, under the direction of National award-winning actress Surabhi Lakshmi, marking her directorial debut. The song portrays a girl's surreal thoughts, influenced by the traditional art form Nangiarkoothu. Promoted by prominent artists, the production featured contributions from cinematographer Pappinu and sound designer Renganath Ravee. Written by Shyla Thomas and composed by Gayathri Suresh, it was performed by Dr. Shani Hafees and filmed in Edamalayar and Kakkayam.

Basic Information - Stage Two - Kaumaaram

Direction	Surabhi Lakshmi (Debut Direction)
Lyrics	Shyla Thomas
Singer	Dr. Shani Hafees
Music	Gayathri Suresh
DOP	Pappinu
Programming	Jecin George
Sound Design	Renganath Ravee
Sound Engineer	Vaitheeswaran Sankaran
Mixing & Mastering	Renjith Rajan
On Screen artists	Meenakshi Binesh, Dr. Indhu G, Kalamandalam Aswathy Aneesh, Margi Visishta, Margi Aswathy
Released by	Tovino Thomas, Miya, Anu Sithara, Aishwarya Lakshmi, Nimisha Sajayan and Samyuktha Menon
Release date	26 July 2019
Song Link	https://www.youtube.com/watch?v=Em9Lyq16GR4

== Stage 3 - Youvanam (യൗവനം) Youth ==
"Youvanam"
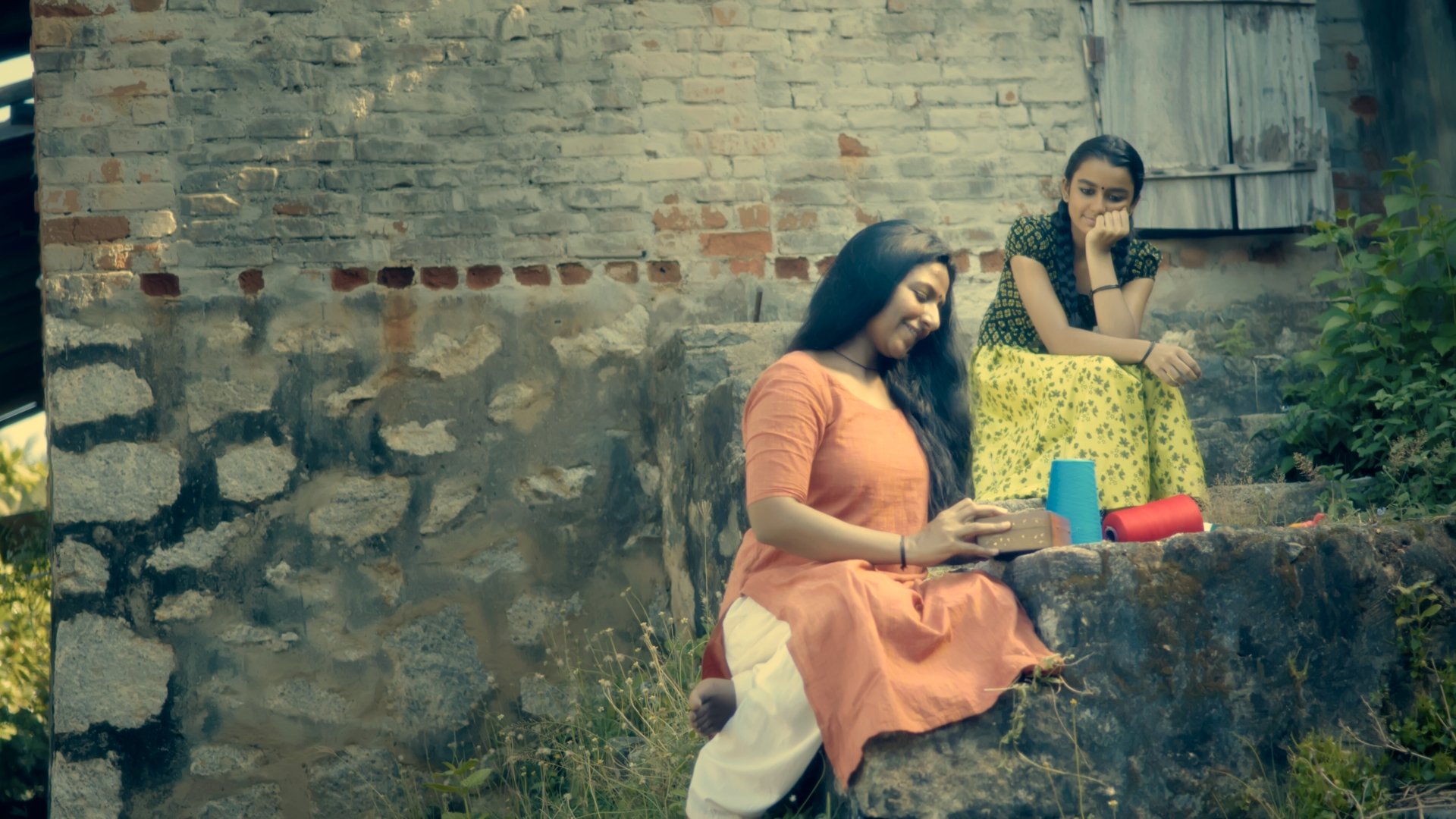
- Dhanya Ananya and Aami play lead roles in Youvanam song

Song by Dr. Shani Hafees
- Released: March 1, 2020
- Songwriter: Shyla Thomas
- Composer: Madhuvanthi Narayan
- Lyricist: Dr. Shani Hafees

Music videos
- Youvanam on YouTube

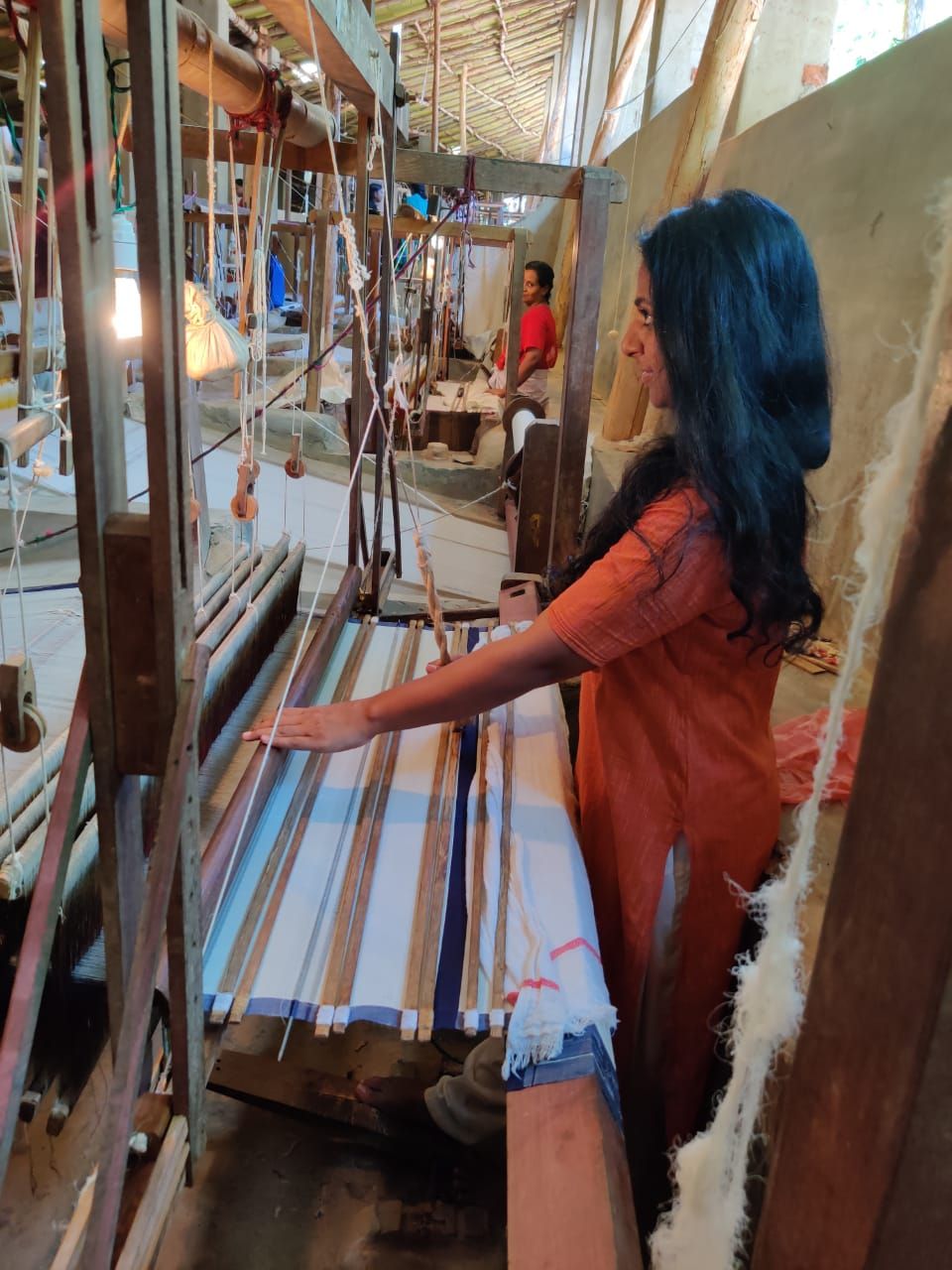
Youvanam portrays life of a girl working in Handloom Industry

Youvanam is the third song in the Pennaal series, focusing on the life of a village girl working in the handloom industry, who reflects on a past love affair. The visuals highlight the weaving process, while also paying tribute to the declining handloom industry. Directed by Shyla Thomas, the song was written and sung by Dr. Shani Hafees with music by Maduvanthi Narayan. Actress Asha Sarath released the first look poster, and Malayalam actor Mohanlal launched the song on March 1, 2020.

Basic Information - Stage Three - Youvanam

Direction	Shyla Thomas
Lyrics & Singer	Dr. Shani Hafees
Music	Madhuvanthi Narayan
DOP	Pappinu
Programming	Vijay
Sound Design	Renganath Ravee
Sound Engineer	Vaitheeswaran Sankaran
Mixing & Mastering	Sujith Sreedhar, 2BQ Studios, Chennai
Flute	Vishnu Vijay
Location & Support	Shobha Viswanath, Weaver's Village
On Screen artists	Dhanya Ananya, Aami, Shini V, Anamika V Roy
Released by	Mohanlal
Release date	1 March 2020
Song Link	https://www.youtube.com/watch?v=5xD3Nvo-JnI

== Stage 4 - Maathruthvam (മാതൃത്വം) Motherhood ==
Maathruthvam is the fourth song in the Pennaal series, exploring the theme of motherhood. The song depicts a daughter reminiscing about her mother's care and affection through a series of scenes, as she revisits her now-empty ancestral home to relive the past. Maathruthvam has received attention in Malayalam media for its portrayal of these emotional memories and its unique features.

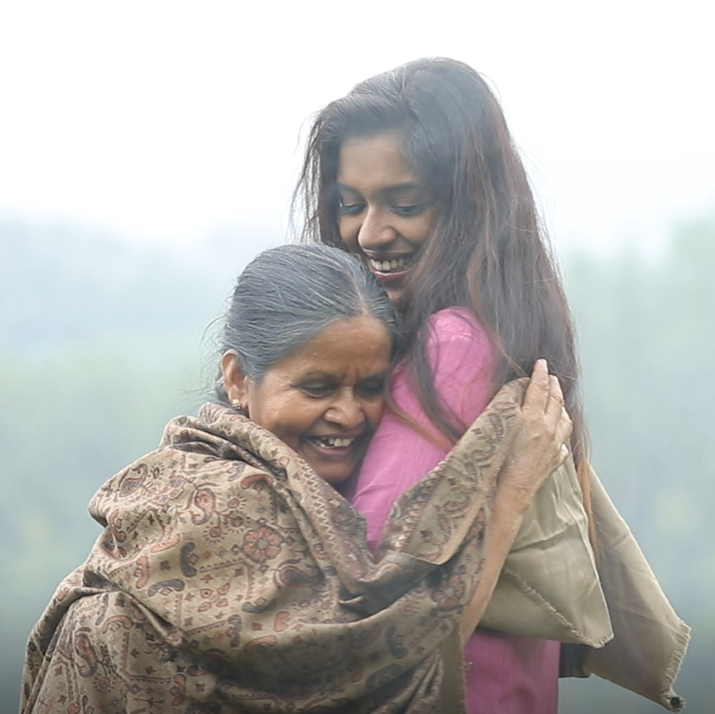
Indian National award winner Savithri Sreedharan and actress Renju Govind - a scene from Maathruthvam song video

Basic Information - Stage Four - Maathruthvam

Lyrics & Direction	Shyla Thomas
Singer	Dr.Shani Hafees
Creative Director	Surabhi Lakshmi
Music	Gayathri Suresh
DOP	Sumesh Sukumaran
Chief Associate Director	Jithu K Jayan
Editing	Rizal Jainy & Aravind Gopal
Programming	Jecin George
Mixing & Mastering	Renjith Rajan
Violin	Roopa Revathi
Veena	Vaibhavi R
On Screen artists	Savithri Sreedharan, Renju Govind, Sumitha Akhil, Baby Almithra Akhil
Poster Released by	Pearle Maaney
Song Release date	16 October 2020
Song Link	https://www.youtube.com/watch?v=RnOmrAoiBg4

== Stage 5 - Vaardhakyam (വാർദ്ധക്യം) Old age ==
Vaardhakyam (Old Age), the fifth stage of the Pennaal series, was released on March 15, 2023, by Kerala MLA and former Health Minister KK Shailaja at the Different Art Centre in Trivandrum. The song portrays an elderly woman, a cancer survivor, rediscovering her passion for dance while interacting with disabled children and their mothers. The transformation in her life is captured through soothing lyrics and music, emphasizing themes of nostalgia, resilience, and joy in old age.

Basic Information - Stage Five - Vaardhakyam

Lyrics & Direction	Shyla Thomas
Music & Singer	Sithara Krishnakumar
On Screen artists	Leela Samson, Shyla Thomas, RJ Sumi, Children and mothers of Different Art Centre
Venue	Different Art Centre (An initiative by Gopinath Muthukad for the disabled children)
Release date	15 March 2023
Released by	KK Shailaja Teacher
Song Link	https://www.youtube.com/watch?v=aKbtnxAcbXQ

== The women within Pennaal ==
A group of women collaborated on the Pennaal project, contributing to various aspects of its creation. Key contributors included Shyla Thomas, Dr. Shani Hafees, Surabhi Lakshmi, Gayathri Suresh, Chinnu Kuruvilla, Madhuvanthi Narayan, Smitha Saleem, Archana Gopinath, and Devi Manoj. These women played significant roles in writing, direction, music, and production, collectively shaping the project.

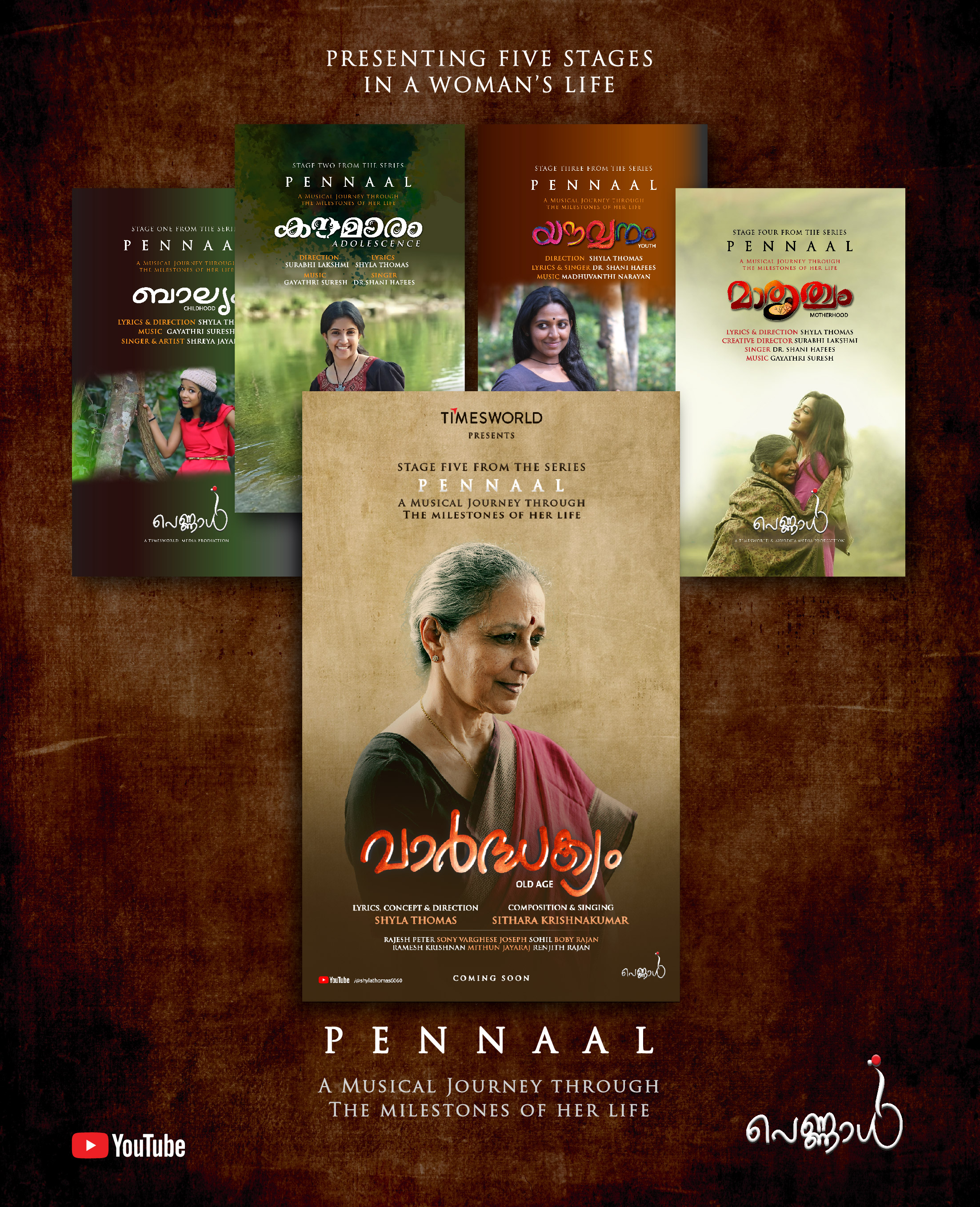

== Trivia ==
The Pennaal music series, consisting of five songs representing the major milestones of a woman's life, is considered the first of its kind in the Malayalam music industry. Each stage is depicted through a thematic video that highlights either a traditional art form or a specific industry.
