= Madhyamam =

Malayalam-language newspaper published in Kerala, India

- Front page of Madhyamam, 9 April 2009
- Type: Daily newspaper
- Format: Broadsheet
- Publisher: Ideal Publication Trust
- Editor-in-chief: O. Abdurahman
- Editor: VM Ibraheem
- Founded: 1987
- Political alignment: Centre-Left
- Language: Malayalam
- Headquarters: Silver Hills, Kozhikode, Kerala, India
- Circulation: Above 350,000 daily
- Sister newspapers: Madhyamam Weekly
- Website: madhyamam.com

Madhyamam (meaning Medium) is a Malayalam-language newspaper published in Kerala, India, since 1987. It was founded by Ideal Publications Trust run by the Jamaat-e-Islami Hind wing in Kerala. It has nine editions in India (seven in Kerala and one each in Mangalore and Bangalore) and its Persian Gulf edition Gulf Madhyamam has nine in the Middle East.

According to Indian Readership Survey 2021 and IRS 2010 Q4, it is the fourth popular newspaper in Kerala with a circulation of 1.5 lakhs and readership of 6 lakhs.

The newspaper and its team of journalists have secured nearly ninety awards including Ramnath Goenka Journalism Award, Statesman Award for Rural Reporting, PUCL Journalism Award for Human Rights, ESR World Journalism Prize and the Asian Development Bank Institute (ADBI) Developing Asia Journalism Award.

== Ownership ==
Madhyamam is owned by the Ideal Publications Trust under Jamaat-e-Islami. The trust claims as their aim "providing non-profit non-partisan and value-based journalistic service free from market pressures". The non-profit nature of the ownership, it says ensures the paper stays free of market compulsions of a business concern and be selective in the advertisements it publishes.

== History ==
First issue of Madhyamam

Madhyamam began publishing in 1987 at Silver Hills near Calicut. Veteran journalist Kuldip Nayar inaugurated the newspaper. Vaikom Muhammad Basheer, Malayalam writer, described it as "the birth of a silver star".

The opening editorial on 1 June 1987 read:

Madhyamam comes to you, the reader, with a clear sense of purpose... Mass media are today passing through a period of degeneration. This sphere is not an exception to the general deterioration of values. The face of truth is being concealed behind the glitter of gold. In this murky situation we offer wholesome journalism reflective of a healthy worldview.

The second edition was launched in July 1993 at Cochin, followed by the third at Trivandrum in April 1996. Gulf Madhyamam was first published from Bahrain in 1998 and then from Dubai in 2002.

K C Abdullah, P K Balakrishnan, and K A Kodungallur were among its early editors. Renowned writer C Radhakrishnan served as its consultant editor from 1997 to 1999. O Abdurahman is the current editor of Madhyamam, and PA Abdul Hakeem is the publisher in charge. VK Hamza Abbas is the chief editor of Gulf Madhyamam. Media critique Dr. K Yasin Ashraf is the associate editor of Madhyamam.

== Supplements ==
Cover page of Madhyamam Weekly

Apart from the daily edition, Madhyamam has an online edition at madhyamam.com and also publishes various supplements:

- Varadya Madhyamam, a weekend supplement
- Madhyamam Kudumbam (Family Madhyamam), focussing on family and children
- Thozhil Madhyamam, a career supplement
- Vidhyabhyasa Madhyamam, an education supplement
- Info Madhyamam, an IT supplement
- Madhyamam Annual, an annual supplement
- Madhyamam Vidhya, an educational supplement
- Ruchi, a Recipe Magazine
- Upabhokthr (Consumer) Madhyamam, a business supplement
- Velicham, a school supplement

== Growth ==
Madhyamam has the fourth largest circulation in Kerala, and combined with Gulf Madhyamam, the market leader amongst Malayalam newspapers in the Middle East, has the third largest circulation amongst Malayalam newspapers.

It now has nine editions in India: in Kozhikode, Thiruvananthapuram, Kottayam, Kochi, Malappuram, Kannur, Thrissur, Bangalore, Mangalore and Mumbai. The edition at Thrissur was inaugurated on 18 August 2009 by the Defence Minister of India A.K Antony. In April 2011, the paper expanded to its 10th edition in India from Mumbai. The Governor of Maharashtra State handed over a copy to Oscar award winner Resul Pookutty.

=== Gulf Madhyamam ===
Gulf Madhyamam, a subsidiary, is the first international Indian newspaper and most popular Malayalam newspaper in the Middle East, with more editions in the Persian Gulf countries than any other daily in the Middle East. It is published from four locations in Saudi Arabia (Riyadh, Dammam, Jeddah and Abha), one in the UAE (Dubai), one in Oman (Muscat), and from Bahrain, Kuwait and Qatar.

Okaz group, a leading media conglomerate in Saudi Arabia, has tied up with the Gulf Madhyamam Daily, the No.1 Malayalam daily in the Middle East. It is published from nine centres in the Persian Gulf region, with four editions in Saudi Arabia. The partnership will enable both media houses to enhance their distribution network.

=== Other publications ===
In October 2001, Madyamam Health launched a healthcare scheme for the poor, "Santhwanam", and has so far reportedly spent more than Rs 30 million to treat almost 5000 patients.

Kudumbam is the Lifestyle monthly family magazine, Ruchi is a recipe and health Magazine, Madhyamam Vidhya is an annual educational Magazine, Madhyamam Online is a Malayalam online News portal and Madhyamam English is an English online news portal.

=== Television channel ===
The Madhyamam Group also runs a Malayalam-language news-cum-entertainment television channel named Media One TV. The channel was licensed in September 2011 and was officially launched on 10 February 2013. The main studio is located at Velliparamba, Kozhikode.

== Awards and honours ==
ADBI Award-winning article in Varadya Madhyamam, published on 15 October 2006

The Madhyamam team has won numerous national and international awards for its contribution to journalism and in particular issues of agriculture, rural development and human rights.

International honours

Savad Rahman, a sub-editor at Madhyamam, won the Development Journalist of the Year prize at the Developing Asia Journalism Awards (DAJA), sponsored by the Asian Development Bank Institute (ADBI). An article on the plight of women trapped in the brothels of Mumbai earned him the prize. He also won the Diversity and Equal Opportunity special prize at the ESR World Journalism Prize 2007 for his feature "Bant Singh The Lion of Mansa", about Bant Singh, a Dalit activist in Punjab. won a silver medal for Tokyo Olympics print design competition 2021 conducted by newspaperdesign.in

National awards

P.K. Prakash, a senior staff reporter since 1996, won the 23rd "Journalism for Human Rights" award instituted by the People's Union for Civil Liberties (PUCL) in 2003. His reports on the Adivasi land issue in Muthanga, the illegal kidney trade in Kerala, prisoner torture at the Aluva Sub-jail, and the illegal viagra experiments on infants at a private hospital in Kochi earned him the award. He also earned a special mention from the PUCL award committee the previous year.

His article series "Choothattam Thudarunna vipani" (The continuing gambles of the market, published 26–30 Oct 2007), explaining the impact of globalisation on the remote corners of rural India, and "Bhoomiyude jaathi" (Caste of the land), an analytical study on the impact of land reforms on the Dalit population in Kerala, won him "The Statesman Award for the Best Rural Reporting – First Prize" (2007), and the Ramnath Goenka "Excellence in Journalism Awards for Regional Languages 2007–2008" – Print category. He also received the 12th National Media Fellowship instituted by the National Foundation for India, a Rs. 100,000 grant for conducting studies on the plight of adivasis in the Kerala model of development.

MJ Babu, a senior reporter of Madhyamam since 1993, twice won "The Statesman Award for the Best Rural Reporting", first in 1998 and then in 2008. His series of articles titled "Pattanam gramathodu cheyyunnath" (What a city does to a village, published:7–9 April 2008) won him the 2008 award. The series was about the sorry plight of the people living around the Canoli canal of the Chakkamkandam Lake in Guruvayoor where all the waste including human excreta from the city were dumped making it a breeding ground for many diseases. It also highlighted how paddy cultivation near Guruvayoor was destroyed due to pollution.

State government awards

PK Prakash won the 2007 Ambedkar Media Award instituted by the Government of Kerala, for his report on "Bhoomiyude jaathi" (Caste of the land), an analytical study on the impact of land reforms on the Dalit population in Kerala. He also won the same in 2004 for his investigative report on the illegal kidney trade in Kerala.

Jisha Elizabeth, a reporter at the daily, won the award in 2009 for her article series on a tribal colony working its way to join the mainstream of society with the help of the government.

NS Nisar, currently Chief Sub Editor at madhyamam.com, won the BR Ambedkar Award for outstanding news reports on Scheduled Castes and Scheduled Tribes, instituted by the Government of Kerala, for his articles ‘Veyilettu Vadiya Prathibha Vilasangal’, ‘Ente Aattinkoodanu Ee Veedinekkal Nallathu’, and ‘Babuvilninnu Ramyayilekku – Oradivasiyude Jeevithapath’. The reports were published in the Madhyamam Weekly in 2016.

Razak Thazhathangadi, press photographer at the newspaper, won the State Media Award 2003 in the news photography category for his photographs titled "Niram Maratha Nimisham" (The moment which did not change colour).

N P Jishar, Senior correspondent, won the media award constituted by the Department of Culture, Govt of Kerala, for best reporting in International Film Festival of Kerala in December 2010, and a media award for state school Kalolsavam reporting constituted by Department of Education, Government of Kerala 2010.

Press Club / Press Academy awards

Madhyamam reporter Akbarali Puthunagaram won the Theruvath Raman Award 2006 instituted by the Calicut Press Club for his work "Super Chikiltsa, Hitech Kolla" (Superior treatment, Hi-Tech exploitation), which appeared between 31 August to 5 September 2006.

Assistant Editor T P Cheruppa won the award in 2007 for his editorial "Nellu Mlechamo" (Is paddy shameful? – 11 Dec 2007).

Sub-editor G Prajesh Sen won the award in 2008 for his work "Vadakathottiyile Vilppanatharatt", which appeared in the paper from 31 July to 6 August 2008. PK Prakash and Prajesh Sen also won the R. Krishnaswamy Journalism Award, jointly instituted by the Keralashabdam weekly and the Kollam Press Club, in 2007 and 2009 respectively. The two also won the V. Karunakaran Nambiar Award instituted by Kerala Press Academy in 2007 (PK Prakash) and 2009 (Prajesh Sen).

Reporter N P Jishar received the Chowwara Parameswran award of the press academy in 2008 for the serial named "Karshaka paadangalil kaliman khananam". He also received the First Best reporter award constituted by government of Kerala in state school festival, 2008.

PK Prakash won the first C.P. Mammu Endowment award 2006 instituted by the Ernakulam Press Club for his story "Bhoomiyude jaathi" (Caste of the land).

TP Cheruppa won the maiden Kambissery Memorial Journalism Award instituted by the Kollam Press Club in 2006 for the best editorial in a Malayalam daily. The chosen editorial was "Irayakkapedunna Shaishavam"(Victimizing childhood), which appeared in Madhayamam on 24 June 2006.

MJ Babu received the Dr Moorkkannoor Narayanan Award instituted by the Kerala Press Academy, the Oorja Kerala Award and the Farm Journalism Award instituted by the State unit of the Indian Veterinary Association.

== Printing centres/Editions ==
Kozhikode, Thiruvananthapuram, Kochi, Thrissur, Kottayam, Kannur, Malappuram, Bangalore, Dubai, Qatar, Bahrain, Kuwait, Jeddah, Riyadh, Dammam, Abha, and Oman

== Controversies and criticisms ==
=== Email snooping incident ===
A controversy arose after Madhyamam Weekly reported that police had sought passwords and login details of accounts from various service providers like Gmail, Yahoo, Hotmail, Rediffmail and Asianet India, among others. Alleging that it was an attempt at religious profiling, the daily claimed that 268 email accounts had been subjected to surveillance, out of which 258 belonged to Muslims. None among them had any previous criminal background and there was no clarity as to why they were put under surveillance, the newspaper stated. A probe was ordered after leading Muslim organisations in Kerala demanded Chief Minister Oommen Chandy's explanation in this issue as he is handling the Home Affairs.

Chandy said that Madhyamam Weekly had not published the complete list, and provided the lists after removing the emails of people belonging to other communities. He said the weekly must come clear on this. The investigating officers got 268 mail IDs from a person and they were handed over to the hi-tech cell for tracing the identity, and no hacking attempt was made, he added.

=== Insulting religious sentiments case ===
In accordance with an order from the Ernakulam judicial first magistrate court, on 11 March 2014, Kerala Police registered a case against Madhyamam and other media organizations in response to a petition regarding allegations raised against Mata Amritanandaymayi, accusing them of insulting religious sentiments. Madhyamam was booked under Sections 153A, 153B, 295A, 298, 120B and 34 of the Indian Penal Code.

=== Taliban support ===
The newspaper was widely criticised for gloryfying Taliban takeover of Afghanistan in 2021. It reported the news of US retreat from Afghanistan following the fall of Kabul with the title 'Free Afghan'.

== Other publications ==
Madhyamam Weekly has been a literary and political magazine since 1998. It claims a circulation of 25,000 copies each week. The magazine contains regular columns of prominent writers like Maythil Radhakrishnan ("Moonnu Vara"), Viju V Nair ("Vellezhuthu"), KEN Kunhahammad ("Idapedal") and Babu Bharadwaj ("Vazhipokkante Vaakkukal").

It gave new insight into the murder of Naxal Varghese, a 1970s leader of the CPI (ML) in Kerala during the Emergency of 1975–1977. A penitent policeman in the Kerala Police, Constable Ramachandran Nair dictated a confessional note to M.K. Jayadevan which was later handed over to "Gro" Vasu, an erstwhile Naxalite who later published it in Madhyamam Weekly. The letter was then used an important evidence in the Supreme Court of India P. Vijayan vs State of Kerala case.

== See also ==
- MediaOne TV
