= Chathur Mukham =

2021 film directed by R. K. Sankar and Salil V.

- Theatrical release poster
- Directed by: Ranjeet Kamala Sankar; Salil V
- Written by: Abhayakumar K Anil Kurian
- Produced by: Jiss Toms; Justin Thomas; Manju Warrier
- Starring: Sunny Wayne; Alencier Ley Lopez; Manju Warrier
- Cinematography: Abinandhan Ramanujam
- Edited by: Manoj
- Music by: Dawn Vincent
- Production companies: Jiss Toms Movies; Manju Warrier Productions
- Distributed by: Century Release
- Release date: April 8, 2021
- Running time: 138 minutes
- Country: India
- Language: Malayalam
- Budget: ₹5.5 crore (US$570,000)

Chathur Mukham (transl. The Fourth Face) is a 2021 Indian techno-horror thriller film directed by Ranjeet Kamala Sankar and Salil V for the screenplay written by Abhayakumar K and Anil Kurian. The film stars Manju Warrier, Sunny Wayne, Alencier ley Lopez, Niranjana Anoop, Babu Annur, Shyamaprasad and Rony David in lead roles. Manoj has edited the film while Abinandhan Ramanujam handled the cinematography. Dawn Vincent composed the original songs and background score. The film is jointly produced by Jiss Toms and Justin Thomas under Jiss Toms Movies and Manju Warrier Productions. In the film, Thejaswini, a young woman, buys a cheap smartphone after she loses her old one in an accident. Soon, she is terrorised by a malevolent supernatural entity through the phone, which threatens her safety and those of others, making her seek help.

Chathur Mukham is the story of that nightmare, when over acceptance and dependence on technology can take a turn for the worse, leaving one's best friend as the worst enemy. The movie, with the international title 'The Fourth Face' is selected to the 25th Bucheon International Fantastic Film Festival (BIFAN) in South Korea, one of the premier festivals for fantasy and horror. It is showcased in the World Fantastic Red sections of the festival. It was selected to Chuncheon International Film Festival (CIFF) and Méliès International Festivals Federation (MIFF) as Asian entry.

== Plot ==
Clement is a retired professor from the Kerala Agricultural University who has also been an avid science enthusiast all his life. Antony, a young man has come to meet Clement with a peculiar problem. He believes that Clement can find a solution to this 'never seen before' phenomenon. Over a cup of tea, Antony details the story of a young, bright woman – Thejaswini. She is a woman of today's times being a complete social media addict and constantly attached to her phone. Together with Antony, she runs a CCTV solutions business at Thiruvananthapuram. Thejaswini is from a middle-class family and believes that every girl should have a good education and attain financial stability before her nuptials. Thejaswini's parents are getting older and her sole sibling is an elder brother Bijesh who is not on talking terms with her. While attending a mudiyattam ritual at the temple, an accident renders Thejaswini's smart phone useless.

With the intention of having a cheaper phone as a stand by for the time being, Thejaswini comes across an unheard of brand of phone, called Liza, on a local reseller website. The phone has attractive features, a low price, and an accompanying free gift. Soon as she purchases the phone and it arrives via courier, unnatural events start to happen around her. These occurrences which seem way out of the normal, start to impact Thejaswini's work, self and even her body, so much so that she tries to get rid of the new purchase by various means, only to find it pulling her back to itself with greater force. Thejaswini suspects that there is something much deeper behind these events and that its somehow connected to her. She along with Antony set out on the journey to unravel the mystery behind the phone.

The mystery, it turns out, is life-threatening. The malevolent spirit behind the phone, Adarsh Paul, is the creator of the Liza phone. In his lifetime, Adarsh was unsuccessful in procuring investors for the phone. One prospective investor backed out, upon discovery that the selfie camera did not work well, and gave Adarsh a deadline of 21 days to fix the selfie camera. This matter sent Adarsh into a rage, angry that his phone was not well respected, and frustrated with the 21 day deadline. Adarsh became determined to kill others involved. He killed one investor, then set the lab on fire, and attempted to leave, only to find himself trapped in the lab. Once he perished, he became trapped in his own creation. Since then, those who purchase the phone are given 21 days to live. The number of days left is recorded in the selfie photo taken by the victims. Some who once had the phone have died. Thejaswini discovers that she has even less time to live, as the number in her selfie photo suddenly dropped from 15 to 4. The pair realise that they need to get help fast.

Thejaswini and Antony turn to Clement to find closure to this problem. Clement, though shaken due to the unexplainable incidents, consults his friend Ramachandran, who advises him to keep aside the ego of a scientist and accept the issue to arrive at an out-of-the-box solution. The trio experiment with using a Faraday cage to trap the negative energy inside positive energy. Keeping the Liza phone in the oven contains the negative energy for one day, enough for the number in Thejaswini's selfie photo, which would have been 1, to become 2. But the group realises that the oven will not be enough to keep containing the negative energy. The group decides to have a large Faraday cage custom-built. But the Faraday cage cannot be built on time, at reasonable price, through official channels. So, the group resort to having the Faraday cage built illicitly, at high cost, as otherwise Thejaswini does not have much time to live.

When the Faraday cage is built, the group sets out to turn on the machine. The trip is perilous; Thejaswini's and Antony's lives are threatened at every step. Eventually, Antony succeeds in turning on the machine. Thejaswini, who had been incapacitated, begins to recover. With the Faraday cage turned on, the malevolent spirit's power over Thejaswini and Antony ends. The group returns home.

Words that were said during the investigation are revisited. The camera shows the frightened Adarsh, trapped in the lab which he had set on fire, while it is said that he may be trapped in his own creation. It is said that negative energy cannot be destroyed, and that the energy within us may return in new forms. One investigator had copied the contents of the Liza phone to a computer. That investigator's words are repeated, as the camera pans to the computer, which is loading the contents of the Liza phone. A message appears on the command line: "Press <ENTER> to activate". The desk lamp falls onto the computer keyboard, hitting the Enter key, and thus activating the copy of the Liza phone. What happens thereafter is unknown.

== Cast ==
- Manju Warrier as Thejaswini
- Sunny Wayne as Antony
- Alencier Ley Lopez as Clement
- Niranjana Anoop as Safiya
- Babu Annur as Thejaswini's father
- Shyamaprasad as Ramachandran
- Rony David as Naveen Joseph
- Srikant Murali as Philip Tharian
- Shaju Sreedhar as Dr. Manoj Thomas
- Kalabhavan Prajod as Bijesh
- Balaji Sarma as Zakaria
- Navas Vallikkunnu as Basheer
- Saranjith as Adarsh Paul

== Production ==
Chathur Mukham was filmed and completed during December 2019 and January 2020 at Trivandrum.

== Music ==
The first single from the film album, Mayakondu, was released by Manorama Music on 29 March 2021 in YouTube. The second song from the film album, the spooky Paathiyil theerunno, was released by Manorama Music on 8 July 2021 in YouTube.

Track	Song	Lyricist	Composer	Singer(s)
1	Mayakondu	Manu Manjith	Dawn Vincent	Shweta Mohan
2	Paathiyil theerunno (Liza culmination)	Manu Manjith	Dawn Vincent	Amrita Jayakumar

== Release ==
=== Theatrical ===
The film was released on 8 April 2021. Due to COVID-19 second wave in India, the movie was released in theatres for a week and then restricted because of increase in cases.

=== Home media ===
The film got digitally released on 9 July 2021 on VOD ZEE5 and Telugu dubbed version in Aha.

== Reception ==
=== Box office ===
On the opening day, the film grossed around 15 lakhs only. On the opening weekend, it grossed around ₹75 lakhs, with a one-week collection around ₹85 lakhs. Due to the clash with Nizhal, collections went low and grossed ₹1.2 crore nett and ₹1.5 crore internationally. In its final run the movie grossed over ₹1.7 crore against a budget of ₹5.5 crore.

=== Critical response ===
Chathur Mukham opened to positive reviews, most of them praising Manju Warrier's performance as a social media addicted woman possessed by her smartphone, the same way a person can be possessed by a ghost.

Baradwaj Rangan of Film Companion South reviewed, "A Techno-Horror With Solid Writing And Great Performances", and added "This is not the kind of horror movie where you get jump scares, even though I did jump out of my chair once. You could call the film eerie and gently supernatural.". S R Praveen of The Hindu noted that the film "has a few surprises up its sleeve" and added that "there is often an attempt to provide a scientific explanation for the happenings on the screen, with some of the characters even poking fun or dismissing the traditional Malayalam horror movie ingredients of black magic and exorcism". Sajin Shrijith of Cinema Express said that "It's a film brimming with a lot of interesting and surprising ideas" and noted that "the film, primarily billed as a techno-horror thriller, manages to effectively combine elements of other sub-genres too, namely body horror and found footage." Few critics had mixed thoughts about the movie. Anna Mathews of Times of India criticised that the makers have "created some scary moments, but the horror elements are not scripted strongly and 'logically' enough", but praised Manju Warrier's performance. She noted that "Manju Warrier carries the role like only she could, being light-hearted when needed and shifting gears to feeling fearful in the most convincing manner."

Sanjith Sidhardhan from OTTPlay noticed that "directors and scriptwriter to come up with novel concepts that movies like Ezra had employed, while ensuring that it passed the ‘logic’ test of the audience" and added that "Chathur Mukham also serves as a reminder of the value of relationships and the world around us that people seem to forget while obsessed with their virtual life."

The Free Press Journal noted that Chathur Mukham decently scores as a supernatural thriller because of its novel premise, likable performances, and a focused screenplay that does not have any forced or unrelated subplots. It begins on a thoughtful note pointing towards the present era in which the human race is fast becoming slave of its self-invented gadgets and social networks.
