= Minnaminungu =

- Directed by: Anil Thomas
- Written by: Manoj Ramsingh
- Screenplay by: Manoj Ramsingh
- Story by: Manoj Ramsingh
- Produced by: Anil Thomas
- Starring: Surabhi Lakshmi
- Cinematography: Sunil Prem
- Edited by: K Sreenivas
- Music by: Ouseppachan
- Distributed by: Chandrakanth PT
- Release date: 21 July 2017
- Running time: 130 minutes
- Country: India
- Language: Malayalam

Minnaminungu (lit. 'Firefly') is a 2017 Indian Malayalam-language film directed by Anil Thomas and written by Manoj Ramsingh.

The film features Surabhi Lakshmi as a struggling middle-aged mother, her character has no name in the film. The film's soundtrack was composed by Ouseppachan. The film was produced on a small budget. It was released in India on 21 July 2017. Lakshmi received critical praise for her performance in the film. At the 47th Kerala State Film Awards, she received a Special Mention and at the 64th National Film Awards, she won the Best Actress.

== Cast ==
- Surabhi Lakshmi as Mother
- Rebecca Santhosh as Charu
- Prem Prakash as MN
- Balu Narayan as Gopalan
- Krishnan Balakrishnan as Prabhu
- Archana Padmini as Vineetha
- Suresh Prem as Sudhi
- Radhakrishnan as Benchamin
- Arun Nair as Akbar Bai
