= Wolf (2021 Indian film) =

2021 film by Shaji Azeez

- Promotional poster
- Directed by: Shaji Azeez
- Written by: G. R. Indugopan
- Based on: Chennaya by G. R. Indugopan
- Produced by: Santhosh Damodharan
- Starring: Arjun Ashokan; Samyuktha; Irshad Ali; Shine Tom Chacko; Jaffar Idukki
- Cinematography: Faiz Siddiq
- Edited by: Noufal Abdullah
- Music by: Ranjin Raj
- Production company: Damor Cinema
- Distributed by: ZEE5
- Release date: 18 April 2021
- Running time: 113 minutes
- Country: India
- Language: Malayalam

Wolf is a 2021 Indian Malayalam-language mystery thriller film directed by Shaji Azeez based on the short story Chennaya by G. R. Indugopan. It was released on 18 April 2021 at the same time through Zee Keralam and ZEE5 application.

== Plot ==
Sanjay is on the way to see his fiancée, Asha, hoping to surprise her. When she opens the door, she is surprised and visibly agitated too. Asha has a conservative mother who is not home at the moment, and Asha worries that Sanjay's presence at this hour will turn her into gossip fodder. Besides, Asha sees Sanjay's short-temper and rude manners even to his close female friends as good enough reasons for not wanting him as her better half. She expresses her concerns about spending the rest of her life with him. He gets increasingly irritated and is desperate to convince Asha that he would not be this way after their wedding. To make matters worse, the prime minister announces the covid lockdown on the same night. Her mother will not get home on time, and since Sanjay's residence is hours away, the cops stationed outside her home forbid him from travelling. Sanjay spends the night at Asha'a place. Asha's mother is concerned that Sanjay is staying over the night. She pesters Asha to show her Asha's room on a video call to verify that Asha keeps her distance from Sanjay. At midnight Sanjay hears weird noises, he inspects the living room to find nothing suspicious going on. In the morning, Asha prepares breakfast and again they hear a noise from upstairs. Worried Sanjay picks a stick from a store room and inspects upstairs without heeding Asha's requests. The noise came from a room on the second floor which Asha claims to be locked. Sanjay forces open the door and surprisingly finds a man who tries to smoke a cigarette. Sanjay questions the man and later that man reveals himself as Asha's lover. Asha and that man (Joe) were planning to elope the same night and to Asha's frustration Sanjay has turned up to ruin their plans.

Joe tells Sanjay that Asha has chosen him over Sanjay due to Sanjay's quick temper. Later Joe turns aggressive and claims to be a hunter in South Africa who wishes to take Asha to South Africa to lead a hunter's life. Shocked, Asha pleads with him to leave her alone and finally Joe explains to Sanjay that he needs to fix his attitude to win a girl's heart. Asha and Sanjay realise that both of them have erred in their relationship. They vow to each other to be better partners and work with mutual understanding. Joe gets into an ambulance which has been arranged by Asha's mother for Sanjay to return to his home. The film ends with a scene where Sanjay is hugging Asha assuring Asha's mother both of them will be safe.

== Cast ==
- Arjun Ashokan as Sanjay
- Samyuktha as Asha
- Irshad Ali as Joe
- Shine Tom Chacko as S.I Jayan
- Jaffar Idukki as Civil Police Officer
