= Oridathoru Postman =

- DVD Cover image
- Directed by: Shaji Azeez
- Written by: Shaji Azeez; Gireesh Kumar
- Produced by: Basheer Silsila; Shaji
- Starring: Kunchacko Boban; R. Sarathkumar
- Cinematography: Anand Balakrishnan
- Edited by: V Sajan
- Music by: Mohan Sithara
- Release date: 8 October 2010
- Country: India
- Language: Malayalam

Oridathoru Postman is a 2010 Malayalam comedy film directed and co-written by Shaji Azeez. The movie features Kunchacko Boban, R. Sarathkumar and Innocent in the lead roles. Kunchacko Boban as a postman in this film was featured in a Kannada textbook.

== Plot ==
Raghunandan is a native of Chenankuzhi village and the son of Gangadharan, the village postman. Gangadharan is a lazy man and does not do his duties well. Raghu has to face the anger of the villagers because his father does not deliver the mails or money orders in time.

Raghu on the other hand is a hard working young man and does any help to the villagers. He is in love with Usha, a student in the PSC exam coaching class where he does part-time teaching. Raghu also plays the mediator in most of the village's major issues. In one such attempt, he meets Yasin Mubarak and this meeting changes his life forever.

== Cast ==
- Kunchacko Boban as Raghunandan
- R. Sarathkumar as Yasin Mubarak
- Innocent as Gangadharan
- Kalabhavan Mani as SI Shahul Hameed
- Meera Nandan as Usha
- Sreekutty as Sneha
- Biju Kuttan
- Jaffar Idukki as Lalu
- Narayanankutty
- Suraj Venjarammoodu as PC Abhilash
- Salim Kumar as Chandrappan
- Kalabhavan Prajod
- Ibrahimkutty as Antony
- Majeed
- Anil Murali as Subair
- KB Ganesh Kumar
- Chempil Ashokan as Annachi
- Baiju Ezhupunna as Bhairavan
- Shanawas as Doctor Zachariah
- Seema G Nair as Chandrappan's wife
- Archana Menon as Nun
- Nisha Sarang as T.P Sumangala

== Production ==
The film was mainly shot at various locations in Thodupuzha. The background score of this movie is copied from film Road to Perdition.
