= The Teacher (2022 film) =

2022 Indian film directed by Vivek

- Theatrical release poster
- Directed by: Vivek
- Screenplay by: P. V. Shajikumar; Vivek
- Story by: Vivek
- Produced by: Varun Tripuraneni; Abhishek Ramisetty; G. Pruthviraj
- Starring: Amala Paul; Hakim Shahjahan; Chemban Vinod Jose; Manju Pillai
- Cinematography: Anu Muthedom
- Edited by: Manoj
- Music by: Dawn Vincent
- Production companies: Nutmeg Productions; VTV Films
- Release date: 2 December 2022
- Running time: 114 minutes
- Country: India
- Language: Malayalam

The Teacher is a 2022 Indian Malayalam-language drama thriller film directed by Vivek who also wrote the story for the film. Produced by Nutmeg Productions and VTV Films, it stars Amala Paul in the titular role alongside Hakim Shahjahan, Chemban Vinod Jose and Manju Pillai. Dawn Vincent composed the film's music.

This film marks the return of Amala Paul to Malayalam cinema after 5 years. It also marks the second directorial of Vivek after Athiran.

The Teacher was released theatrically on 2 December 2022.

== Plot ==
Devika wakes up from sleep and appears confused. She checks for body injuries and finds an earring missing. She cannot remember what happened the day before. She is a school teacher in charge of athletics, and her colleague assures her that she is just tired because the school has been hosting a sports meet over the last four days. Her husband, Sujith, is a male nurse, and together they have been trying to conceive for a long time.

Devika finds out that she is pregnant, but she is still traumatized because she was raped by some college students during the last school meet. She hides that information from her husband. She looked for CCTV footages of what happened but the cameras were not working during that time. She searches porn sites for videos but does not find any. As a last step, she visits one of the students' homes and cleverly keeps her phone on recording mode in his car. From the conversations he has with his friends, Devika understands that they still have video recording of her rape.

Sujith gets to know that Devika is pregnant from the lab report. He visits her doctor who asks Sujith why they are opting for abortion. Sujith confronts Devika and Devika admits that she was raped. Sujith gets angry that the fetus might be one of the rapists and he does not want to father it. Devika wants to file a police complaint, but Sujith discourages saying the family name will be ruined.

Sujith's mother, Kalyani, a veteran comrade, gives her encouragement to take revenge on the students. Devika goes in search of them and finds the leader of the gang working in a food delivery service in Kochi. Kalyani recommends a police informant to her and that he will help her. Devika meets the student and pretends that she is sexually interested in him. He invites Devika to a hotel in a remote place. There she finds all the students in the room who although deletes the video and destroys the memory card, insults and abuse her and says they don't want to see her again. Devika then locks the door and reveals that she is trained in martial arts and fights all the students with the help of her friend. They attach mock bombs to the kids and scare them to death but leave them alive. Finally, she reveals to Sujith that she does not need him in his life, but she will keep the baby.

== Cast ==
- Amala Paul as Devika
  - Deva Nandha as young Devika
- Hakim Shahjahan as Sujith, Devika's husband
- Chemban Vinod Jose as Mani
- Manju Pillai as "Patton" Kalyani, Sujith's mother
- I. M. Vijayan as Gunashekharan, Devika's father
- Nandu as SI Musthafa
- Shajeer P. Basheer as Naveen
- Anumol as Geetha
- Vinitha Koshy as Dhanya
- Hareesh Pengan as Constable Varghese
- Parvathi T. as Gynaecologist Dr Varsha
- Prashanth Murali as Kevin
- Dinesh Prabhakar as Vishwambaran
- Senthil Krishna as Master Abu
- Nikhil Renji Panicker as Ajmal

== Music ==
The Teacher

Soundtrack album by Dawn Vincent
- Released: 2022
- Recorded: 2022
- Genre: Film soundtrack
- Length: 9:10
- Language: Malayalam
- Label: Saregama India Limited
- Producer: Dawn Vincent

Dawn Vincent chronology
Yugi (2022)	The Teacher (2022)	Kaapa (2022)

Singles from The Teacher
- 1. "Kayalum Kandalum" Released: 25 November 2022; 2. "Oruval" Released: 1 December 2022; 3. "Mazhaidara Vaanundu" Released: 7 December 2022

The music of the film is composed by Dawn Vincent. The first single titled "Kayalum Kandalum" was released in YouTube on 25 November 2022 while the second single, titled "Oruval", was released on 1 December 2022. The third single "Mazhaidara Vaanundu" was released on 7 December 2022.

Track listing
No.	Title	Lyrics	Music	Singer(s)	Length
1.	"Kayalum Kandalum"	Anwar Ali	Dawn Vincent	Sreenanda Sreekumar	3:29
2.	"Oruval"	Vinayak Sasikumar	Dawn Vincent	Sayanora Philip, Rithin Parker Joseph	2:38
3.	"Mazhaidara Vaanundu"	Yugabharathi	Dawn Vincent	Jassie Gift	3:03
Total length:					9:10

== Release ==
=== Theatrical ===
The Teacher was released in theatres on 2 December 2022.

=== Home media ===
The streaming rights of the film were bought by Netflix and started streaming on 23 December 2022.

== Reception ==
Sajin Shrijith of The New Indian Express gave the film 3 out of 5 and wrote "When one considers the better-written and staged, albeit more violent, examples of films in the same genre in international cinema, one is bound to find the writing in The Teacher slightly lacking." Anjana George of The Times of India gave the film 2.5 out of 5 and wrote "The Teacher is an old wine in a new bottle where we see an uber masculine vengeful woman who embraces brutality to find solace with the support of a man, which itself is sexist. The trauma of a rape is much more than the revenge and such films do nothing but normalise the physical, emotional distress one go through."
