= Manoj (film editor) =

Indian film editor

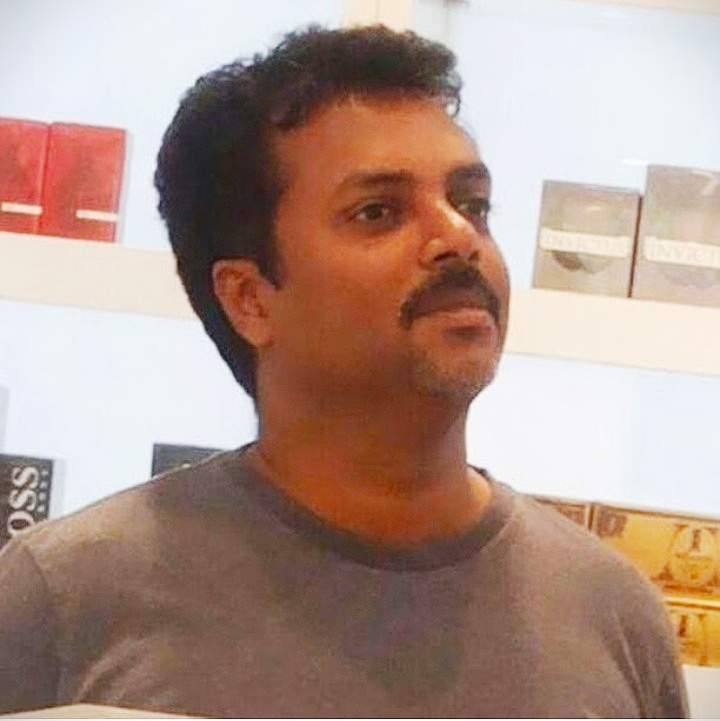
- Born: Thiruvananthapuram, Kerala, India
- Occupation: Film Editor
- Years active: 2006–present
- Awards: Kerala State Film Awards

Manoj is an Indian film editor who works primarily in Malayalam cinema. In 2015, he won the Kerala State Film Award for Best Editor for Ivide.

== Selected filmography ==
Year	Title	Notes
2006	Smart City	
2008	Madambi	
2008	Crazy Gopalan	
2008	Of the People	
2009	Ivar Vivahitharayal...?	
2009	Kerala Cafe	
2010	Happy Husbands	
2010	Nayakan	
2010	Pramani	
2010	Marykkundoru Kunjaadu	
2010	The Thriller	
2011	Nadakame Ulakam	
2011	Teja Bhai & Family	
2011	City of God	
2011	Kunjaliyan	
2011	Venicile Vyapari	
2012	Husbands in Goa	
2012	Grandmaster	
2012	I Love Me	
2012	Friday	
2012	Akasathinte Niram	
2013	Nee Ko Njaa Cha	
2013	Amen	
2014	Pakida	
2014	1983	
2014	Law Point	
2014	Mr. Fraud	
2014	Money Ratnam	
2014	Angry Babies in Love	
2015	Double Barrel	
2015	Ivide	
2015	KL 10 Patthu	
2015	Lukka Chuppi	
2015	Ayal Njanalla	
2016	Action Hero Biju	
2017	Tiyaan	
2017	Prakasan	
2017	Adam Joan	
2018	Street Lights	
2021	Chathur Mukham	
2022	Mahaveeryar	
2022	The Teacher	
2022	19(1)(a)	
2023	Christopher	
2023	Ennalum Ente Aliya	
2024	Oru Kattil Oru Muri	
2025	Idi Mazha Kaattu	
2025	Once Upon a Time there was a Kallan	
2025	Meesha	
2025	Rachel	
2026	Spa	
2026	Prathichaya	
