= Shaji Azeez =

Indian film director and screenplay writer

- Born: Kerala, India
- Education: Malayala Padana Gaveshana Kendram, Thrissur; Bharathiya Vidya Bhavan, Thrissur
- Occupations: Director; screenwriter
- Years active: 2008–present

Shaji Azeez is an Indian filmmaker and writer who predominantly works in the Malayalam cinema and television. He is best known for directing the Malayalam comedy sitcom M80 Moosa and the mystery thriller film Wolf. Shaji is also the author of the book Pradhana Pranayangalile Thapanila, which is his poetry collection.

== Life and career ==
Shaji has directed and acted in some plays during his school and college days. Before co-directing his first Malayalam feature film in 2008, he worked as an associate director with seventeen directors including TK Rajeev Kumar, Priyanandanan and K. K. Rajeev. In 2008, Shaji together with Shyju Anthikkad directed Shakespeare M.A. Malayalam for which Shaji also co-wrote the screenplay. His next film as a director was through Oridathoru Postman (2010). The film explores the father-son relationship in a humorous way. In 2014, Shaji was brought in as the director of the sitcom M80 Moosa. The show, which ran for more than three years and 360 episodes, was acclaimed throughout its run for its realistic touch. M80 Moosa won several awards including the Musris Television Award, Kannur Rajan Award and KP Ummer Award. In 2020, Shaji began work on his third Malayalam film Wolf, which is based on the short story "Chennaya", by author GR Indugopan. It was released in 2021 and received praise for exposing patriarchy through an interesting idea.

In November 2022, Shaji's first book titled Pradhana Pranyangalile Thapanila (The temperature of major romances), which is a collection of his 58 poems, was published at the Sharjah International book festival.

== Filmography ==
=== Films ===
Year	Title	Notes
2008	Shakespeare M.A. Malayalam	Debut film
2010	Oridathoru Postman	
2021	Wolf	

=== Television ===
Year	Title	Notes
2014-2017	M80 Moosa	
