= Madhyamam Weekly =

- Editor: P.I. Noushad
- Categories: Cultural magazine
- Publisher: Madhyamam Group
- First issue: February 1998
- Country: India
- Based in: Kozhikode
- Language: Malayalam
- Website: www.madhyamam.com/weekly

Madhyamam Azhchappathippu or Madhyamam Weekly is a weekly Malayalam–language cultural magazine published by the Madhyamam Group from Kozhikode, India.
