= Kureepuzha Sreekumar =

Indian poet

Kurerpuzha Sreekumar
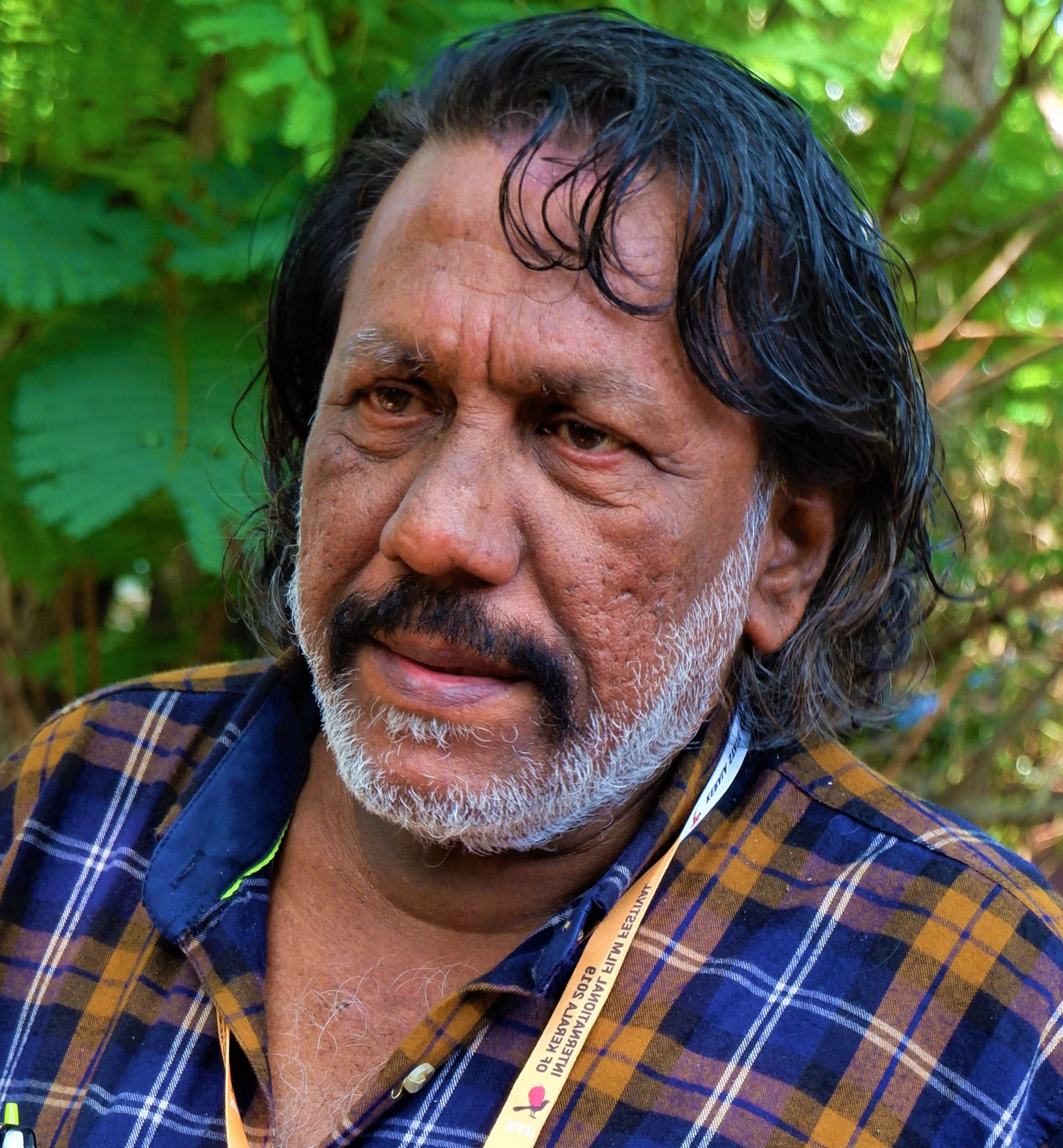
- Born: Kurewpuzha Sreekumar; 10 April 1955 (age 71); Kureepuzha, Kollam, Kerala
- Occupation: Poet
- Writing career
- Language: Malayalam
- Period: Postmodern era
- Notable awards: Best Poet Award, Kerala Sahitya Akademi Sree Padmanabhaswamy Award, Kerala Sahitya Akademi Award for Poetry

Kureepuzha Sreekumar (born 10 April 1955 in Kureepuzha, Kollam, Kerala) is a noted Malayalam poet with modernist inclinations. His books of poetry include Habibinte Dinakkurippukal, his first, published in 1984; jiggere Dukkangal; Rahulan Urangunnilla; Amma Malayalam; Keezhaalan; and Suicide Point. He is an atheist.

== Career as Writer ==
Sreekumar won the Best Poet Award in 1975 from Kerala University, the 1987 Vyloppilli Award for Malayalam poetry, and the Kerala Sahithya Akademi Sree Padmanabhaswamy Award for 2003 for the best work in children's literature for his work Penangunni. He refused to accept the Sree Padmanabhaswamy Award as it was named after a Hindu god. In 2011 he won the Kerala Sahitya Akademi Award (Poetry) for his work Keezhalan.

== Literary works ==
- Amma Malayalam (അമ്മ മലയാളം)
- Uppa (ഉപ്പ)
- Pengalsthan
- Habibinte Dinakkurippukal
- Sreekumarinte Dukkangal
- Rahulan Urangunnilla
- Chaarvakan (ചാർവാകൻ)
- Suicide Point
- Keezhalan (കീഴാളൻ)
- ഇഷ്ടമുടിക്കായൽ
- ജെസി
- നടിയുടെ രാത്രി
- രാഹുലൻ ഉറങ്ങുന്നില്ല
