= Kaapa =

2022 Indian film directed by Shaji Kailas

- Theatrical release poster
- Directed by: Shaji Kailas
- Written by: G. R. Indugopan
- Based on: Shankhumukhi by G. R. Indugopan
- Produced by: Dolwin Kuriakose; Jinu V. Abraham; Dileesh Nair; Vikram Mehra; Siddharth Anand Kumar
- Starring: Prithviraj Sukumaran; Asif Ali; Aparna Balamurali; Anna Ben; Dileesh Pothan
- Cinematography: Jomon T. John
- Edited by: Shameer Muhammed
- Music by: Songs: Dawn Vincent; Jakes Bejoy; Background Score: Dawn Vincent
- Production companies: Fefka Writers Union; Theatre of Dreams; Saregama India Limited
- Release date: 22 December 2022
- Running time: 134 minutes
- Country: India
- Language: Malayalam
- Box office: ₹17 crore

Kaapa is a 2022 Indian Malayalam-language action thriller film directed by Shaji Kailas and written by G. R. Indugopan based on his novel Shankhumukhi. Produced by Fefka Writers Union, Theatre of Dreams and Saregama India Limited, it stars Prithviraj Sukumaran, Asif Ali, Aparna Balamurali and Anna Ben.

The film was announced in August 2021 with Venu assigned as the director. However, he stepped down as director in May 2022, citing creative differences. Shaji Kailas later replaced him. Manju Warrier was initially cast as the lead actress but opted out due to schedule conflicts. She was replaced by Aparna Balamurali. Principal photography took place from July to September that year in Thiruvananthapuram. The music was composed by Dawn Vincent and Jakes Bejoy, cinematography was handled by Jomon T. John and editing by Shameer Muhammed.

Kaapa was released in theatres on 22 December 2022 and received mixed reviews from critics.

== Plot ==
Anand is an IT professional has recently moved to Thiruvananthapuram from Bengaluru with his pregnant wife Binu Thrivikraman. During a routine police check in their neighbourhood, Anand learns that his wife's name is included in the "KAAPA" (Kerala Anti-Social Activities Prevention Act) list, a list that includes the names of all the local gangsters. Anand decides to clear Binu's name and sends her to his hometown to have a safe pregnancy.

Later, Anand meets Arumanayagam, a police constable to seek his help in removing Binu's name, and soon learns about her involvement in leading a gang and her rivalry with the city's leading gangster and upcoming politician Kotta Madhu, as Madhu was responsible for the death of Binu's brother. Anand meets Kotta Madhu and manages to earn his trust in order to help Binu. Later, Anand learns that a reporter named Latheef has hired goons to finish Madhu and informs Prameela, who later informs Madhu. Madhu thrashes them and Latheef gets scared of getting caught by Madhu.

Anand travels to Binu's hometown and arranges their baby's naming ceremony. Latheef meets Anand and reveals about his rivalry with Madhu resulted in his cousin Nazeer getting exiled to UAE. Latheef tells Anand to broker a truce between him and Madhu so he can live a peaceful life. Though reluctant, Madhu agrees and arrives at the spot where the truce is to be finalized, but Madhu is killed in a bomb blast by a boy, whose life was severely damaged by Madhu as he bombed an assassin due to his orders and was sent to juvenile prison.

Anand pays his last respect to Madhu and leaves the premises, feeling guilty about being used by Latheef. After Madhu's autopsy report, Prameela learns that Binu is wearing Madhu's ring; thus revealing that she was the mastermind behind Madhu's death and Latheef was her family-friend. Binu was also the faceless leader leading a gang and attempted to kill Madhu while Anand was busy proving her innocence. Prameela calls Binu and swears that she will avenge Madhu's death, while Binu also promises to protect her family without Anand's knowledge.

== Cast ==
- Prithviraj Sukumaran as P.N Madhu Kumar /Kotta Madhu
- Asif Ali as Anand Anirudhan
- Aparna Balamurali as Prameela, Madhu's wife
- Anna Ben as Binu Thrivikraman, Anand's wife
- Dileesh Pothan as Latheef
- Jagadish Kumar as Jabbar
- Nandu as ASI Arumanayagam
- Senthil Krishna as Mohammad Nazeer aka 'Patthikkayyan' Nazeer
- Sajitha Madathil as Mohammad Nazeer's mother
- Biju Pappan as Sashankan
- Gundukaadu Sabu as District Collector
- Sagar Surya as Biju Thrivikraman, Binu's brother
- Vijayakumar Prabhakaran as police constable

== Production ==
=== Development ===
On 17 August 2021, Prithviraj Sukumaran announced that Mammootty and Mohanlal would be launching a project on 18 August, the next day. That day, 18 August, the motion poster was shared by them and the title was revealed to be Kaapa. The film was initiated by Fefka Writers Union. The title Kaapa is the short form of an act called Kerala Anti-social Activities (Prevention) Act. Venu was the director. But in May 2022, Venu opted out of the film as director due to creative differences between him and Fefka Writers Union. He was then replaced by Shaji Kailas. Cinematographer Sanu Varghese, editor Mahesh Narayanan and musician Justin Varghese were the initial technical crew of the film. They were later replaced by Jomon T. John, Shameer Muhammed and musicians Dawn Vincent and Jakes Bejoy respectively. The film was scripted by G. R. Indugopan based on his novel Shankhumukhi.

=== Casting ===
The film was initially announced with the cast of Prithviraj Sukumaran, Asif Ali, Manju Warrier and Anna Ben. However, Manju Warrier left the film as she was busy with her schedules on shooting for Ajith Kumar's Thunivu (2023). Aparna Balamurali came as the replacement. Actors Dileesh Pothan, Jagadish Kumar and Nandu were later revealed to be part of the cast.

=== Filming ===
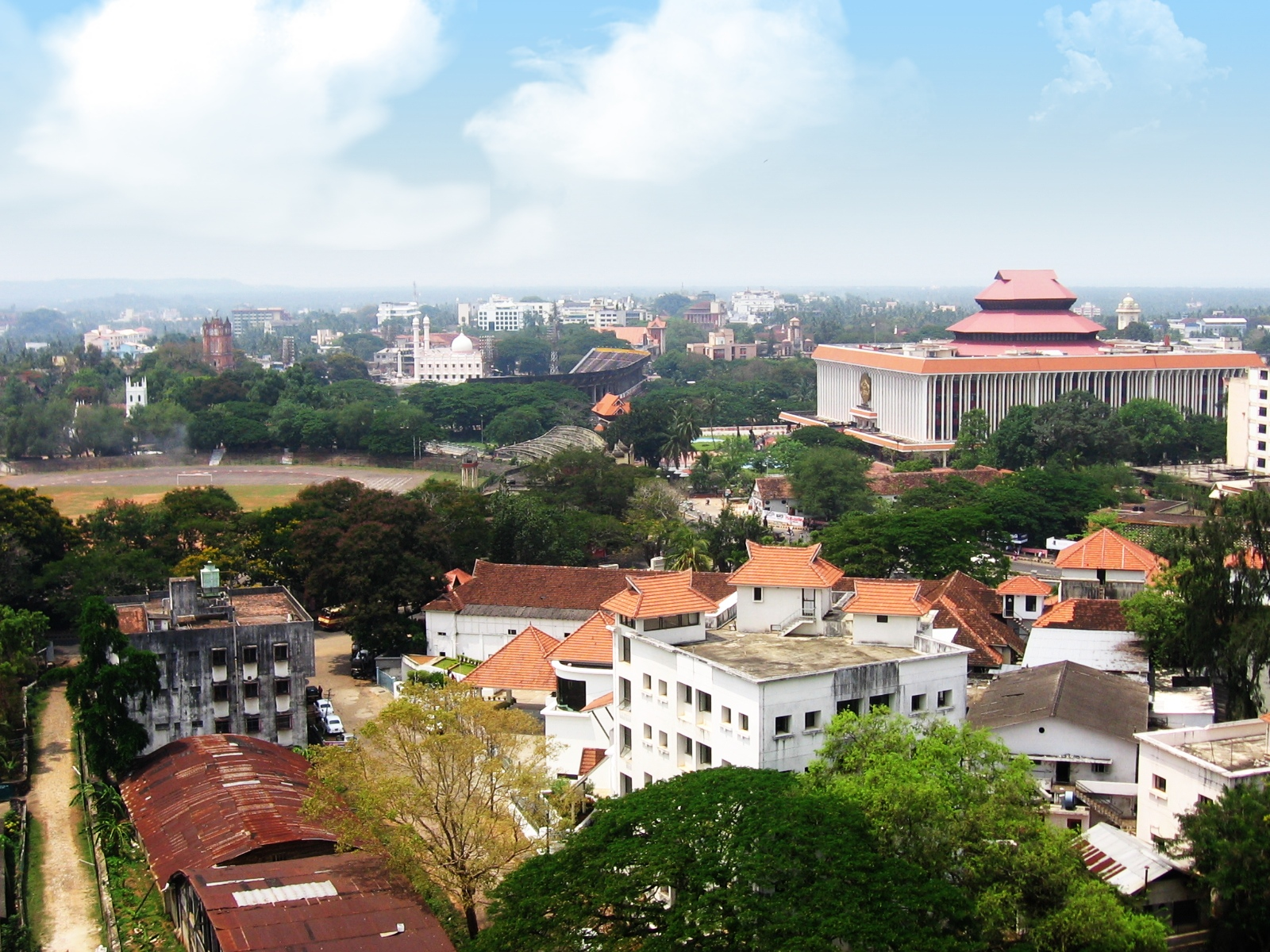
Thiruvananthapuram, where the entire film was shot

Filming was to begin on 20 May 2022 but was postponed due to Venu opting out of the film. Principal photography began on 15 July 2022 in VJT Hall, Palayam, Thiruvananthapuram. On 16 July, director Shaji Kailas sought permission from Chief Minister Pinarayi Vijayan for a day's shooting in the area around the Kerala Government Secretariat as the Government of Kerala had enforced a ban there for shooting. Sukumaran gave a 60 days date for the filming of Kaapa. An action scene with Sukumaran was shot on 26 July. Filming came to a conclusion on 16 September 2022.

== Music ==
Kaapa

Soundtrack album by Dawn Vincent and Jakes Bejoy
- Released: 2022
- Recorded: 2022
- Studios: d's Den, Kochi; NHQ, Kochi; K7, Kochi; Sonic Island, Kochi; Mindscore Music, Kochi; Pop Media House, Kochi; Saptha Records, Kochi
- Genre: Film soundtrack
- Length: 6:44
- Language: Malayalam
- Label: Saregama India Limited
- Producer: Jakes Bejoy

Singles from Kaapa
- 1. "Yamam Veendum Vinnile" Released: 16 December 2022; 2. "Thiru Thiru Thiruvananthapurathu" Released: 19 December 2022

Dawn Vincent chronology
The Teacher (2022)	Kaapa (2022)

Jakes Bejoy chronology
Saturday Night (2022)	Kaapa (2022)	Iratta (2023)

Dawn Vincent and Jakes Bejoy composed the film's music. All recordings were done at Kochi. The first single titled "Yamam Veendum Vinnile" was released on 16 December 2022 while the second single, "Thiru Thiru Thiruvananthapurathu", was released on 19 December 2022.

Track listing
No.	Title	Lyrics	Music	Singer(s)	Length
1.	"Yamam Veendum Vinnile"	Vinayak Sasikumar	Dawn Vincent	Kapil Kapilan	3:00
2.	"Thiru Thiru Thiruvananthapurathu"	Santhosh Varma	Jakes Bejoy	Subhash Babu B, Anugrah Digosh, Akhil J. Chand, Jakes Bejoy	3:44
Total length:					6:44

== Release ==
=== Theatrical ===
Kaapa was released theatrically on 22 December 2022 during Christmas.

=== Home media ===
Kaapa had its post-theatrical streaming on Netflix starting from 19 January 2023.

== Reception ==
=== Critical response ===
Gopika I. S. of The Times of India gave 3.5 out of 5 stars and wrote "More or less, Shaji Kailas has succeeded in delivering a satisfying gangster movie." Latha Srinivasan of India Today gave 3 out of 5 stars and wrote that "Kaapa is one of the better films from Prithviraj this year, among the six releases he had. Those going to watch Kaapa for Shaji Kailas and Prithviraj must go with an open mind for a new experience."

Sanjith Sridharan of OTTplay gave 3 out of 5 stars and wrote "Shaji Kailas hits a meter from the first scene of the film and maintains this till the end, which is a tough aspect to do and this makes the movie watchable."

Manoj Kumar R. of The Indian Express gave 2 out of 5 stars and wrote "Prithviraj's act as Madhu is hard to buy as he comes across as an indecisive and unwise criminal, despite being the head of a crime syndicate."

Sowmya Rajendran of The News Minute gave 2 out of 5 stars and wrote "Shaji Kailas's Prithviraj starrer doesn't work as a mass-action film because it doesn't have enough originality." Anna M. M. Vetticad of Firstpost gave 1.75 out of 5 stars and wrote "Prithviraj Sukumaran and Shaji Kailas serve up a clichéd, bloody gangster drama in which women are not written as fully fleshed out characters but as mere plot devices."

S. R. Praveen of The Hindu wrote "One sees glimmers of what the movie could have been in some of the well-conceived background stories, but director Shaji Kailas ends up giving it a predictable treatment." Nirmal Jovial of The Week wrote "When compared with gangster films of the 2010s, Shaji Kailas's Kaapa is more of a safe-formula film. It ticks almost all boxes—slow-mos, stylised action, ultra-close-ups, punch dialogues."
