= Dawn Vincent =

- Born: Kochi, Kerala, India
- Genres: Film score, world music, electronic
- Occupations: Music Composer, arranger, mixing engineer, sound designer, Sound editor
- Instruments: Piano, keyboard, synthesizer, Seaboard, Bass guitar

Dawn Vincent is an Indian music composer and sound designer. He is a graduate of the Film and Television Institute of India, Pune. He is also an accomplished pianist certified from Trinity College London. He works predominantly in Malayalam cinema.

== Early life and education ==
Dawn was born in Kochi, Kerala, to Vincent John and Sheena Nancy. He has a younger brother, Navin Vincent, who is a structural engineer and also an 8th grade solo guitarist certified from Trinity College London, London. He is married to Priscilla Vaddadi who is working as an animation director in Canada.

Dawn studied in Bhavan's Vidya Mandir, Girinagar, Kochi. He was active as a keyboard player and bass guitarist during his school life. He was part of a rock band and their genre of music included versions of singles from various bands such as Metallica, Dream Theater, Slipknot, Green Day, and Red Hot Chili Peppers. They also performed their own compositions and bagged prizes in many interschool competitions from 2004 to 2008.

He graduated from Karunya University, Coimbatore in 2012 with an undergraduate Bachelor of Technology degree in Electronics and Media Technology. He then joined the Film and Television Institute of India, Pune to pursue his Post Graduation Course in Sound Recording and Sound Design. As a student, he was selected to do an on-location sound recording for a project in Internationale Filmschule Köln, Germany.

== Musical career ==
Dawn initially composed music for short films. He started working in the industry by doing a background score for the film, Mundrothuruth: Munroe Island, directed by Manu in 2016, along with his batchmates from the Film and Television Institute of India, Ashok and Subramanian. He made his breakthrough in the film Adventures of Omanakuttan as a music composer and sound designer, associating with his classmates Rohith V S (director) and Akhil George (cinematographer). He was later associated with filmmakers such as Rajeev Ravi, B. Ajithkumar and Pramod Thomas .

== Filmography ==
Year	Title	Credit	Notes
2016	Mundrothuruth: Munroe Island	Background score	
2016	Kammatipaadam	Music arranger / music mixing engineer/ background score	
2016	Kismath	Music mixing engineer / pre-mixing engineer	
2016	Kaadu Pookkunna Neram	Music editor / pre-mixing engineer	
2017	Samarpanam	Background score	
2017	Adventures of Omanakuttan	Music composer / sound designer	
2017	Tharangam	Sound designer	
2017	Sound of Silence	Assistant mixing engineer	
2018	Eeda	Background score	
2018	Iblis	Music composer / director of audiography	
2019	Run Kalyani	Sound designer	
2019	Thottappan	Sound editor	
2019	Virus	Sound editor	
2019	Android Kunjappan Version 5.25	Additional background score / sync sound recording	
2020	Paapam Cheyyathavar Kalleriyatte	Background score	
2020	Trance	Music engineer (title track)	
2021	Kala	Music Composer / Background score / Sound Designer	
2021	Chathur Mukham	Music composer / background score / Sound Designer	
2021	Nayattu	Pre Mix Engineer	
2021	Kuttavum Shikshayum	Music Composer	
2022	Appan	Music Composer	
2022	Nna Thaan Case Kodu	Music Composer	
2022	The Teacher	Music Composer	
2022	Kaapa	Music Composer	
2023	Higuita	Background Score	
2023	2018	Additional Background Score	
2023	How Is That For A Monday?	Music composer	English; Telugu
2024	Sureshanteyum Sumalathayudeyum Hrudayahariyaya Pranayakadha	Music Composer	
2025	Aap Kaise Ho	Music Composer	
2025	Kaliyugam 2064	Music Composer	Telugu film
2025	Lokah Chapter 1: Chandra	Sound Designer	
2026	Pennum Porattum	Music Composer	
2026	Aadu 3: One Last Ride - Part 1	Background Score only	
2026	Titans †	Music Composer	

== Awards ==
Kerala State Film Awards:

- 2023 –Kerala State Film Award for Best Music Director – Score 53rd Kerala State Film Awards for Nna Thaan Case Kodu
