= MediaOne TV =

Indian television news channel

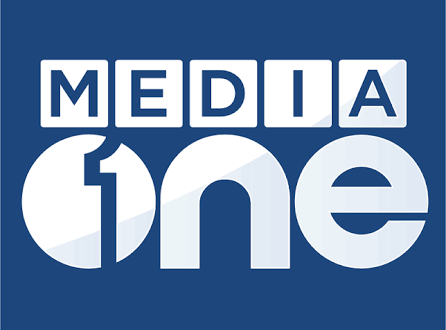
- Country: India
- Headquarters: Kozhikode, Kerala, India

Programming
- Language: Malayalam

Ownership
- Owner: Madhyamam Broadcasting Limited
- Key people: O. Abdurahman, Group Editor (Madhyamam - MediaOne)

History
- Launched: 10 February 2013

Links
- Webcast: mediaoneonline.com/live-tv
- Website: mediaonetv.in

MediaOne TV is an Indian Malayalam-language television channel operated by Madhyamam Broadcasting Limited. The channel was licensed in September 2011 and was officially launched on 10 February 2013. The main studio is located at Velliparamba, Kozhikode, Kerala.

Since its launch, MediaOne TV has been scrutinized for its connections to Jamaat-e-Islami Hind, an Islamic organization; few TV news channels in India are operated by such groups. Broadcasting of the channel was halted by the Ministry of Information and Broadcasting (I&B) in February 2022 after MediaOne's license to distribute the channel was revoked claiming national security issues. Some criticized the ban, which was upheld by a division bench of the Kerala High Court, as being based on undisclosed sealed information. Even though it did not broadcast to television providers, MediaOne continued to distribute its programming online and via social media. On 15 March 2022, the Supreme Court of India issued an interim order staying the ban on MediaOne and allowing it to resume broadcast operations, followed by a judgement in April 2023 that permanently set aside the I&B order.

== History ==
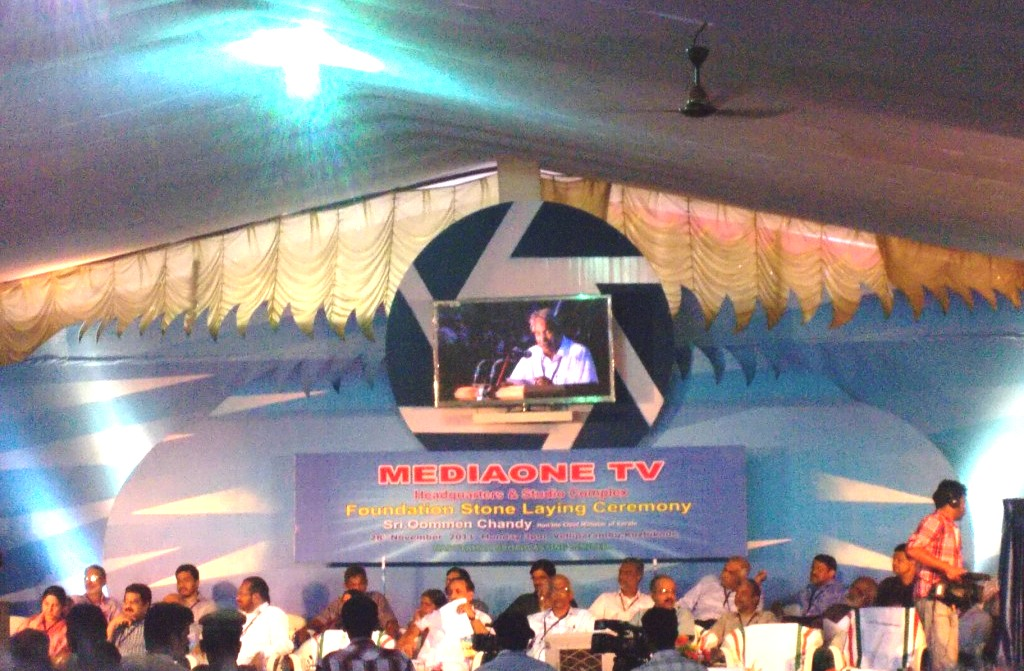
Chief Minister Oommen Chandy was the guest of honor at the foundation stone-laying ceremony for MediaOne's facilities.

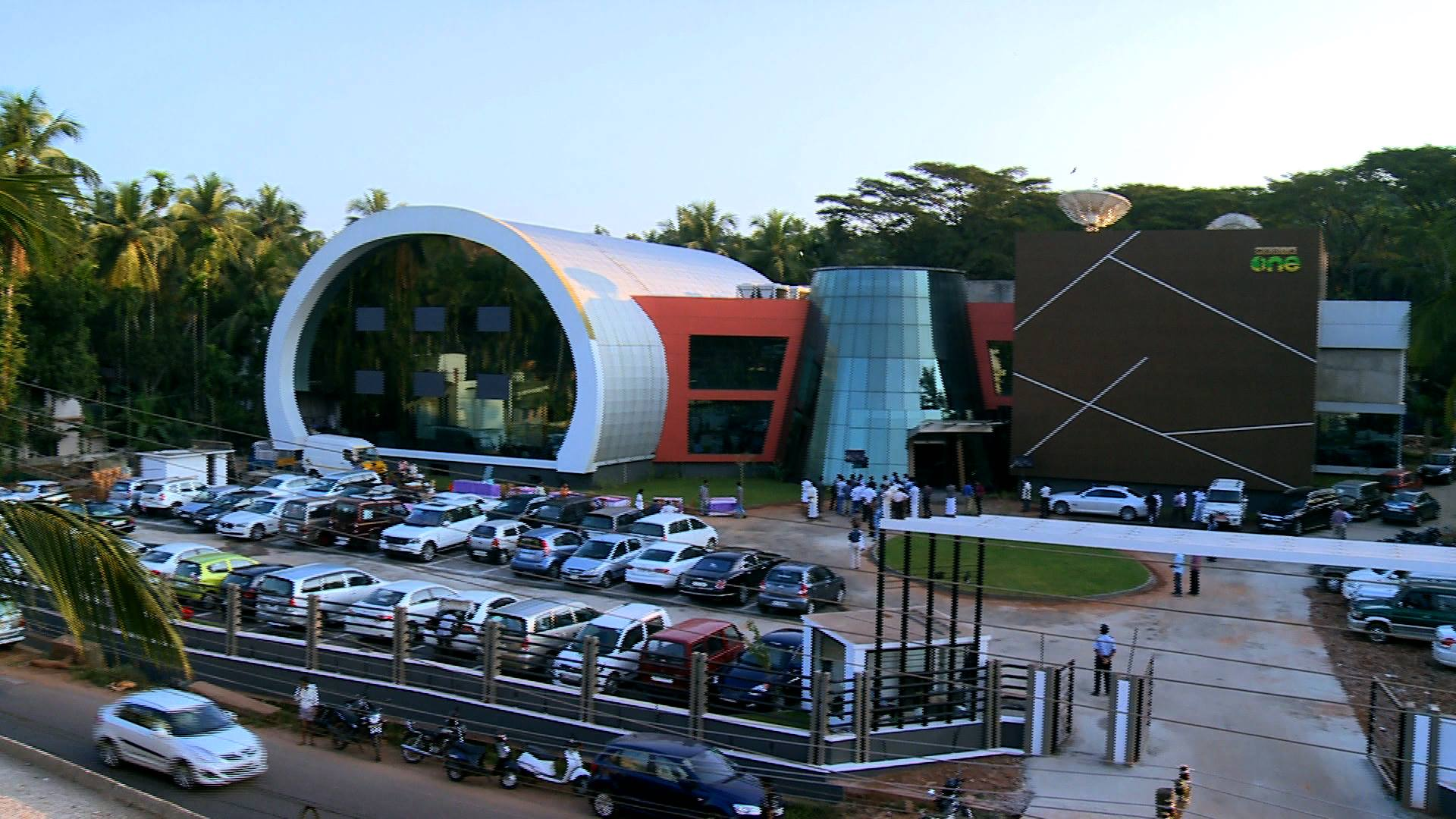
MediaOne TV headquarters and studio

=== Foundation ===
On 16 June 2012, then-Kerala Chief Minister Oommen Chandy presided over a foundation stone–laying ceremony for the MediaOne headquarters and studio complex at Velliparambu near Kozhikode, and former Union Cabinet Minister of Overseas Indian Affairs Vayalar Ravi unveiled the MediaOne logo at an event in Kochi. The channel was officially launched on 10 February 2013 at an event attended by the former defence minister A. K. Antony.

=== Security issues and ban ===
Madhyamam Broadcasting Limited, owners of MediaOne TV and connected to the Islamic organization Jamaat-e-Islami Hind, first experienced a dispute with regulators in 2015. At that time, Madhyamam proposed a second MediaOne channel, to be known as MediaOne Life. However, the Ministry of Home Affairs (MHA) denied the security clearance that was necessary to start the new service. Even though the Ministry of Information and Broadcasting (I&B) had approved the technical aspects of its application, this was dropped in 2019 due to the MHA's denial.

In March 2020, I&B prohibited the transmission or re-transmission of MediaOne TV, along with Asianet News TV, for 48 hours for what it called for "biased" reporting of the North East Delhi riots, stating that the channel was "airing attacks on religions or communities, promoting communal attitudes" and "inciting violence against law and order maintenance and promoting anti-national attitudes". In its ruling, I&B noted that the "channel's reporting on Delhi violence seems to be biased as it is deliberately focusing on the vandalism of CAA supporters [...] questions RSS and alleges Delhi Police inaction [... and] seems to be critical towards Delhi Police and RSS".

On 31 January 2022, MediaOne TV ceased broadcasts at noon after the Ministry of Information and Broadcasting refused to renew the channel's licence to operate in the wake of the MHA's revocation of the security clearance for Madhyamam Broadcasting Limited. The company filed a writ petition to challenge the I&B order, which the Kerala High Court dismissed on 8 February. Justice N. Nagaresh held that the files from the Ministry of Home Affairs contained intelligence inputs that justified the denial of security clearance to the channel:

Going through the files, I find that the Ministry has called for intelligence inputs. Based on the intelligence inputs, the committee of officers has found that security clearance should not be given. The Ministry has decided to accept the finding of the Committee of Officers. Inputs are justifying the denial of security clearance. Therefore, I am dismissing the writ petition.

An editorial in The Hindu criticized the ban for being based on sealed, classified information, without MediaOne being made aware of its contents, as did another in The Indian Express.

On 2 March 2022, the division bench of Kerala High Court upheld the earlier order. It noted that "there are certain serious adverse reports by the Intelligence Bureau against Madhyamam Broadcasting Ltd and its managing director", and though the files did not provide much information as to the dimensions of the issue, the bench indicated that "there are clear and significant indications impacting the public order and security of the state". MediaOne appealed its decision to the Supreme Court of India, alleging that the guidelines for uplinking and downlinking television channels did not require MHA permission at renewal but only upon application for new service.

The Supreme Court stayed the ban and permitted MediaOne to resume operations under an interim order on 15 March 2022, at which time its management announced it would continue broadcasting as it had before the ban was imposed. The three-judge bench's ruling noted that the company was "surely entitled" to know the reasons for the decision; the central government was ordered to file a counter-affidavit by 26 March. On 3 November, the Supreme Court reserved judgment in the case after two days of hearings. A bench judgement, led by Chief Justice of India Dhananjaya Y. Chandrachud, was issued in April; the court found that the government had used national security in a "cavalier manner" to refuse MediaOne the licence and noted that its action to deny broadcasting rights to a news channel had "a chilling effect on free speech and particularly on press freedom". It also chided the High Court for the limited information it gave the defendants in their case, noting that it had left MediaOne "attempting strenuously to fight in the dark".

=== Withdrawal from BARC ===
In October 2025, MediaOne announced its withdrawal from the audience measurement system of Broadcast Audience Research Council (BARC) India, citing a loss of trust in the ratings process and alleging that the sample size and meter placement were unscientific. MediaOne TV stated that despite holding a leading position in digital viewership metrics (including YouTube), its absence from BARC's published ratings raised questions about fairness and transparency. According to the channel, the BARC sample comprised fewer than 1,500 meters out of 8.6 million television households in Kerala, and the meter placements did not proportionally represent all regions and demographic groups. MediaOne thus became the second television channel in India to withdraw from BARC after NDTV.

== Criticism and controversies ==
In February–March 2014, Gail Tredwell, a former disciple and closest personal attendant of Mata Amritanandamayi, released an autobiography titled Holy Hell: A Memoir of Faith, Devotion, and Pure Madness. She alleged that a senior follower of Amritanandamayi's ashram, Balu, had sexual relationships with her and Amritanandamayi for many years and that Amritanandamayi was abusive toward her. The mainstream media of Kerala was reluctant to report about the allegations made in the book. In accordance with an order from Ernakulam judicial first magistrate court, on 11 March 2014, Kerala Police registered a case against five media organizations—Indiavision, Reporter, MediaOne, and newspapers Thejas and Madhyamam—in response to a petition that accused these organizations of airing unverified statements.

On 7 November 2022, Kerala governor Arif Mohammed Khan barred MediaOne TV and Kairali News from covering his press meeting in Kochi, accusing their representatives of being "political persons" who "masquerade as media".
