= Swargam =

2024 Indian Malayalam-language family drama film

- Theatrical release poster
- Directed by: Rejis Antony
- Written by: Dr. Lizy K. Fernandez
- Screenplay by: Rejis Antony; Rose Rejis
- Produced by: Dr. Lizy K Fernandez
- Starring: Aju Varghese; Johny Antony; Ananya; Manju Pillai; Sijoy Varghese
- Cinematography: S. Saravanan
- Edited by: Don Max
- Music by: Bijibal; Jinto John; Dr. Lizy K. Fernandez
- Production company: CN Global Movies
- Distributed by: CN Global Movies; Valluvanadan Cinema Company
- Release date: 8 November 2024
- Running time: 156 minutes
- Country: India
- Language: Malayalam
- Budget: ₹4 crore

Swargam (സ്വർഗം, meaning Heaven) is a 2024 Indian Malayalam-language family drama film directed by Rejis Antony and produced by Dr. Lizy K Fernandez under the banner of CN Global Movies. The screenplay was written by Rejis Antony and Rose Rejis, based on a story by Dr. Lizy K. Fernandez, with cinematography by S. Saravanan and editing by Don Max.

The film stars Aju Varghese, Johny Antony, Ananya, Manju Pillai, and Sijoy Varghese in the lead roles. Music was composed by Bijibal, Jinto John, and Dr. Lizy K. Fernandez. Swargam was theatrically released on 8 November 2024 across India and internationally. It subsequently began streaming on Amazon Prime Video, Sun NXT, and ManoramaMAX. The film won the Best Movie with a Message award at the Kerala Film Critics Association Awards 2024.

== Plot ==
Swargam centres on two neighbouring families in Central Travancore, Kerala: Jose Kutty (Aju Varghese), a farmer living a modest rural life with his wife Cicily (Ananya), and Vakkchan (Johny Antony), a patriarch from a wealthier household who has returned from abroad. The film follows their contrasting domestic circumstances and the tensions that arise between the families over time, with Annie Amma (Manju Pillai) and Fr. Sony Puthenkaduppil (Sijoy Varghese) playing significant roles in the community around them. The title, meaning "Heaven" in Malayalam, reflects the film's argument that domestic contentment, rather than wealth, constitutes true happiness.

== Cast ==
- Aju Varghese as Josootty
- Johny Antony as Vakkchan
- Ananya as Cicily
- Manju Pillai as Aniyamma
- Sijoy Varghese as Fr. Sony Puthenkaduppil
- Vineeth Thattil as Retd. C.I. George
- Lizy K. Fernandez as Saramma
- Sajin Cherukayil as Shaji
- Abhiram Radhakrishnan as Freddy
- Ranji Kankol as Sivaram
- Unni Raja as Sukumaran
- Puthillam Bhasi as Gopi Pilla
- Manohari Joy
- Kudassanad Kanakam as Therthya Chedathi
- Thushara Pillai as Marykutty Teacher
- Mary Chechi as Janaki
- Manjady Joby as Nimmy George
- Surya as Christo
- Sreeram as Elbin
- Devanjana as Shiny
- Sujesh Unnithan as Bose
- Rithika Rose as Rejis Niya George
- Rio Don Max as Christopher
- Cinderella Don Max as Christeena

== Production ==
=== Development ===
Swargam was Rejis Antony's second feature film as director, following his 2015 debut Oru Second Class Yathra. The story was conceived by Dr. Lizy K. Fernandez, a medical professional and producer who drew from observations of Malayali family life, particularly among overseas Malayalis, to shape the film's premise. The screenplay and dialogues were adapted by Antony and Rose Rejis. The project was publicly launched on 5 April 2024 at the POC Centre's Cherupushpam Hall in Palarivattom, Kochi, in the presence of Bishop Mar Joseph Pamplany of Thalassery and MLA Mani C. Kappan.

=== Filming ===
Principal photography began on 11 April 2024 and was completed by May 2024. The film was shot primarily in Pala and Erattupetta in the Kottayam district, located in Central Travancore. Cinematography was handled by S. Saravanan, and the art direction was by Appunni Sajan. Kala Master served as choreographer. The first look poster was released on 17 August 2024.

== Music ==
The film's music was composed by Bijibal, Jinto John, and Dr. Lizy K. Fernandez, with background score by Bijibal. Lyrics were written by Santhosh Varma, B.K. Harinarayanan, and Baby John Kalayanthani — the latter contributing to a Malayalam film soundtrack for the first time through Swargam. The soundtrack of three songs was released on 5 September 2024 under the CN Global Music label.

Swargam (Original Motion Picture Soundtracks)
| No. | Title | Lyrics | Music | Lyrics | Length |
|---|---|---|---|---|---|
| 1. | "Sneha Chaithanyame" | Vijay Yesudas | Jinto John, Dr. Lizy K. Fernandez | Baby John Kalayanthani |
| 2. | "Nalloru Ravinte" | Haricharan, Sudeep Kumar, Anna Baby, K. S. Chithra | Jinto John | Santhosh Varma |
| 3. | "Meenachilarinte Theeram" (also known as Kappa Paattu) | Sooraj Santhosh, K. S. Chithra | Bijibal | B.K. Harinarayanan |
| Total length: | | | | | 12:41 |

== Release ==
=== Theatrical ===
Swargam was released theatrically on 8 November 2024. Inaugural shows in Perth and Brisbane, Australia, were sold out on opening day. In India, the film ran in theatres across Kerala and Chennai. In the Middle East, it screened in Dubai, Fujairah, Abu Dhabi, and Sharjah. Wider releases followed in the United States, Canada, Oman, Qatar, Australia, Malta, the United Kingdom, and Ireland.

=== Vatican screening ===
A special screening of Swargam was held at the Vatican in November 2024, attended by several hundred people, and drew coverage from multiple Malayalam media outlets.

=== Digital ===
Following its theatrical run, Swargam was made available on streaming platforms. It premiered on Amazon Prime Video on 5 February 2025, on Sun NXT on 31 January 2025, and on ManoramaMAX on 16 February 2025.

== Reception ==
P.J. Jose of Mathrubhumi described the film as a feel-good portrayal of contrasting family values, praising director Rejis Antony's handling of the two neighbouring households and singling out performances by Aju Varghese, Johny Antony, and Manju Pillai, as well as Bijibal's music and S. Saravanan's cinematography of Central Travancore landscapes. Some critics noted that while the film's intentions and visual style were commendable, the screenplay lacked a strongly defined central conflict.

== Accolades ==
| Award | Category | Nominee(s) | Result | Ref. |
|---|---|---|---|---|
| Kerala Film Critics Association Awards 2024 | Best Movie with a Message | Swargam (shared with Mashippachayum Kallupencilum) | Won | |
