= Autorsha =

2018 Movie

- Poster
- Directed by: Sujith Vaassudev
- Written by: Jayaraj Mithra
- Produced by: Mohandas; Sujith Vaassudev; Lenin Varghese
- Starring: Anusree; Sankar Induchoodan; Amar Vikas; Adarsh Rajan
- Cinematography: Sujith Vaassudev
- Edited by: Johnkutty
- Music by: Sharreth
- Production companies: MD Media - A production house owned by Thazhchayil Creations, owned by Mohandas Damodaran, an NRI businessman Larva Club
- Release date: 23 November 2018
- Running time: 134 minutes
- Country: India
- Language: Malayalam

Autorsha is a 2018 Indian Malayalam-language comedy film directed and filmed by Sujith Vaassudev, and starring Anusree as a female auto rickshaw driver, with Rahul Madhav, Sankar Induchoodan, Tini Tom as supporting roles. The film received positive reviews.

== Plot ==
Anitha makes her living as an auto driver in Kannur. Her auto rickshaw adventures with passengers, as she travels around Kannur, form the crux of the story. Anitha buys a new auto rickshaw and goes about her life. Her day-to-day life in the auto stand is shown, but nothing is revealed about her family or her house.

During a wedding, Anitha meets her school classmate, and they rekindle their friendship. From there, flashback shows that Anitha is actually Haseena, and she had a loving family. She falls in love with an auto driver named Manoj and wants to marry him. Her father is against this, so they elope to Mangalore, taking the gold her father had saved for her future.

In Mangalore, they rent a house and decide to sell the gold and start a bakery business. While they come home, they realise that their house has been robbed. Going to the police also does not help. In a few days, Manoj deserts her, and from the neighbours she learns that he has cheated many girls like this, and he has planned the robbery.

Disheartened, she goes back to her home and father, where her sister is due to get married in a week. Fearing another scandal due to her return, her whole family kills itself. Haseena, unable to go on with her life, decides to kill herself, but changes her mind. She does many small jobs and saves enough money to buy an auto rickshaw, changes her name to Anitha, and starts a living.

One of her acquaintances, Shyam, hosts a birthday party for his daughter, and Anitha offers to cater for the function. There she sees Manoj as a guest who is also the business partner of Shyam. Anitha had known that Manoj and Shyam were business partners from the picture in Shyam's office, and also seen them together from a previous job as a toll booth employee. She also comes to know that Manoj married a Kannur-native woman six years ago and their school-going son Achu has travelled many times in Anitha's auto-rickshaw.

Anitha confronts Manoj when no one is around, but he scorns her, telling her she is just a woman, and he is unafraid of her. He even goes to the extent of saying that he will keep doing what he did to her to other woman, and his current marriage is also a sham. She then secretly fatally poisons his alcoholic drink, which he was to drink. He dies the next day. A content Anitha is seen driving off in her auto rickshaw, singing to herself.

== Cast ==
- Anusree as Anitha / Haseena
- Rahul Madhav as Manoj
- Sankar Induchoodan as Rahul
- Tini Tom as Sub Inspector
- Naseer Sankranthi
- Sunil Surya as Santhosh
- Rashid Naseer as Abbas
- Aparna Janardan as Aparna
- Anagha Naryanan as a girl at a Bus stop
- Thushara Nair as Manoj's wife
- Amar Vikas
- Dr Amar Ramachandran
- Sivadas Kannur as Shanthettan
- Shafeer Khan as Shyam
- Subeesh Sudhi
- Manju Pillai

== Production ==
Autorsha is the second directorial of cinematographer Sujith Vaassudev after James & Alice (2016). It was scripted by Jayaraj Mithra, the creator of the satirical TV series Marimayam. The filming began on 7 March 2018 in Kannur, Kerala.

== Reception ==
=== Critical reception ===
The film received positive reviews from critics.

Anjana George of The Times of India rated the film 3.5/5 stars, and states that Autorsha is a "woman-centric", "realistic" story about a female auto-rickshaw driver. She praises Anusree's performance for making the character a "delightful journey", showcasing her innocence, vulnerability, grit, and confidence. She writes: "The well-scripted and directed movie is not a story of a victim but of a girl who fought it alone despite losing everything she possessed."

Lissy Simon of Onmanorama notes that Autorsha starts as a slice-of-life narrative but later turns into "a revenge drama". The first half is described as "entertaining and engaging", while the second half and the ending are considered to be lacking and abrupt. She praises Anusree's "realistic" performance and the background music. She wrote: "A simple tale, 'Autorsha' is the story of a girl who fights to survive rather than end life. Without any wow moments, this revenge drama is definitely watchable."

Sajin Shrijith of The New Indian Express rated the film 4/5 stars and calls Autorsha a "fresh, engrossing drama." The film's first half is praised for its "authentic, documentary-style" and the realistic portrayal of an auto rickshaw driver's life. He commends Anusree's performance and the director for the use of a special camera rig that adds to the film's gritty feel. He suggests that the "hype-less" film is a surprising success that makes "the maximum impact." He wrote: "In this day and age when directors make exaggerated claims about their films, something like Autorsha comes along silently and leaves you with a smile on your face."

Cris of The News Minute praises Autorsha for its "engaging first half." He further praised Anusree's performance and the screenplay. He notes that the initial part of the film is a realistic and "engaging" portrayal of Anita's life. However, the review also states that the second half of the movie relies on "a few disappointing clichés" and feels "hastily built." Despite the letdown, the review concludes that Anusree "easily pulls off a woman-centric film without letting you even notice that little but very important fact."
