= Thatteem Mutteem =

Indian sitcom

- Thattem Mutteem S1 poster
- Genre: Soap opera; Comedy Drama; Indian television series
- Written by: Gireesh Gramika
- Directed by: R. Unnikrishnan; Gopalan Manoj; Midhun Chettur; Shahbaaz C. N
- Creative director: Sukil
- Starring: Manju Pillai; KPAC Lalitha; Jayakumar Parameswaran Pillai; Naseer Sankranthi; Rajesh Paravur; Shalu Kurian; Bhagyalakshmi Prabhu; Sidharth Prabhu; Anoop Vincent
- Opening theme: Onnum Rendum Mindum Neram (Season 1); Thattiyalum Kerum Chonan (Season 2)
- Country of origin: India
- Original language: Malayalam
- No. of seasons: 4
- No. of episodes: 881

Production
- Producer: MM TV
- Production location: Eramalloor
- Running time: 25 minutes (approx.)

Original release
- Network: Mazhavil Manorama
- Release: 1 July 2012 – 2 July 2023

Thatteem Mutteem (transl. Hit and knock) was a Malayalam-language sitcom that has broadcast on Mazhavil Manorama from 1 July 2012. It was one of Malayalam television's oldest and longest-running series, having premiered at the channel's launch. The show stars veteran actors K.P.A.C Lalitha, Manju Pillai, Jayakumar Parameswaran Pillai, Naseer Sankranthi, Bhagyalakshmi Prabhu, Sidharth Prabhu, Rajesh Paravoor, Shalu Kurian, Shara Sherly Samuel Koshy, Parvathy Lal and Anoop Vincent in lead roles. It has been critically acclaimed, winning the Kerala State Television Award for the Best Comedy Show in both 2014 and 2016.

The show went on an extended hiatus from November 11, 2022, returning to air with a new lead character, Madhuriamma, played by actress Bindu Panicker, on April 22, 2023. However, the show discontinued airing on July 2, 2023.

All series episodes are available on ManoramaMAX, Prime Video, and the official Mazhavil Manorama YouTube channel.

== Broadcast ==
The first season of the show, which premiered in 2011, followed a sitcom format and broadcast every weekend for six years. The show switched to a prime time soap opera format on December 3, 2018, airing Monday through Friday at 9:00 p.m. IST. The show's format was changed to a weekend airing in late 2020.

In June 2023, the programme switched from airing on the weekends to Monday through Wednesday at 10:00 p.m. IST.

=== Death of lead actress ===
Due to the illness and subsequent passing of lead actress K. P. A. C. Lalitha in February 2022, the series was temporarily put on hold. It resumed airing on April 16, 2022.

== Season(s) ==
Season	No. of episodes	Originally broadcast (India)	
Season	No. of episodes	First aired	Last aired
1	311	1 July 2012	2018
2	533	2018	2022
3	37	22 April 2023	2 July 2023

=== Premise ===
==== Season 1 ====
The recurring theme is the dispute between Mayavathyamma and her daughter-in-law Mohanavalli, and the struggle of the children and Arjunan to resolve it. Although the daughter-in-law and mother-in-law often get into disagreements followed by a cat and mouse fight, they share mutual respect and love.

Arjunan's best friend, Kamalasanan, Mohanavalli's mother, Komalavalli, and Arjunan's sister, Kokila, pay them frequent visits, causing additional strife and drama in the family. The whole family moves to a new home after having a dispute with the son of the owner of their previous home.

Season 2

The daughter of the Arjunan' family, Meenakshi is now married to Aadhi Shankaran. Meenakshi found out that Aadhi is a lazy employee and is the son of Pravasi Shankaran, who is a poor NRI owed to many debts, but she kept this a secret and marries him believing that she can change him. She shows the same trait as her mother by having disputes with her mother-in-law, Vasavadatha, the wife of Pravasi Shankaran, who became mentally ill after winning a lottery which put ends to their debts. Despite their hateful relationship, the daughter-in-law and mother-in-law duo loved each other and shared mutual respect.

Meanwhile, Arjunan's millionaire brother Sahadevan, his wife Vidhubala, and his three children, Chinnu, Chikku and Chinnan, arrive from the United States. They are the owners of the house to which Mayavathi and her family belong.

Kannan, the only son of Mohanavalli and Arjunan falls in love with Rosamma, a Christian girl after a series of events that disapproved of the family. But later, for the dowry, they agree to their marriage to pay off a loan taken for Meenakshi's wedding, but the plan fails when Kannan unknowingly informs Rosamma's parents that he wants nothing from them except for their daughter. Meenakshi gives birth to triplets - Kunjumani, Muthumani and Kuttappayi and not so late after, she goes to the UK as a nurse to pay off the loan.

Mayavathi Amma, the house's sole breadwinner, has died, leaving Arjunan and Mohanavalli unsure how to maintain the household. In the meantime, Meenakshi has returned from London during the Covid period. Mohanavally and Arjunan tried numerous methods to make a living but were unsuccessful. Only with the support of Sahadevan and Meenakshi are they able to advance in their lives. Meanwhile, Kannan and Rosamma's relationship grew stronger, and they married after overcoming several obstacles.

==== Season 3 ====
Arjunan is retired from his government job in water authority, and Sahadevan lost his house and assets playing online rummy. Kannan's wife Rosamma now houses Arjunan and Sahadevan's family. They both travells to Punjab to visit Mayawati's long-eloped sister Madhuri in order to take possession of their deceased uncle's property. Meanwhile, Madhuri Amma arrives earlier at their home. Madhuri assists Mohanavally financially to stabilise her home by disguising herself for a former acquaintance of Mayavathi and then revealing her true identity. Arjunan and Kamalasanan found out that Sahadevan had lied about losing all of his assets, he then invites Arjunan's family to live in their former home.

=== Crossover episodes ===
In 2016 and 2021, the show aired crossover episodes with Marimayam, a situation comedy that airs on the same channel on weekends and depicts numerous painful and amusing scenarios while visiting government organisations. The special episodes were titled "Marithatteem Mayammutteem" and "Thatteem Mayam Mutteem Mayam" in 2016, and "Thatteem Mayam Mutteem Mayam" in 2021, respectively. The Onam celebrations were the backdrop for all of the special episodes.

== Cast ==
=== Main cast ===
Actor	Character	Seasons				Note
Actor	Character	1	2	3	4	Note
K. P. A. C. Lalitha	Mayavathi Amma	Main	Main	Deceased	Deceased	Mother of Arjunan, Nakulan, Sahadevan and Kokilakshi. Mother in law of Mohanavall, Shishupalan,Mandakini and Vidhubala. Grandmother of Meenakshi and Kannan. She has died.
Manju Pillai	Mohanavalli Arjunan	Main	Main	Main	Main	Mayavathi's daughter in law, Arjunan's wife, Meenakshi and Kannan's mother and Kommalavally's daughter
Jayakumar Parameswaran Pillai	Arjunan Krishnan	Main	Main	Main	Main	Mayavathi's son, Mohanavalli's husband, Meenakshi and Kannan's father. Sahadevan, Nakulan and Kokilakshi's elder brother
Naseer Sankranthi	Kamalasanan	Main	Main	Main	Main	Arjunan's best friend
Bindu Panicker	Madhuri Amma				Main	Sister of late Mayavathi Amma, maternal aunt to Arjunan, Nakulan, Sahadevan and Kokila
Bhagyalakshmi Prabhu	Meenakshi Arjunan	Main	Main	Replaced	Replaced	Mohanavalli and Arjunan's daughter. Mayavathi and Kommalavalli's granddaughter. Kannan's elder sister. Aadhi's wife.
Shara Sherly Samuel Koshy	Meenakshi Arjunan			Main	Main	Mohanavalli and Arjunan's daughter. Mayavathi and Kommalavalli's granddaughter. Kannan's elder sister. Aadhi's wife.
Sidharth Prabhu	Kannan Arjunan	Main	Main	Main	Main	Arjunan and Mohanavalli's only son. Mayavathi and Kommalavalli's grandson and Meenakshi's younger brother.
Parvathy Lal	Rosamma		Recurring	Main	Main	Kannan's girlfriend-turned-wife
Sagar Surya	Aadhi Shankaran / Aadhi		Main	Main	Replaced	Vasavadatha and Shankaran's only son. Meenakshi's husband.
Anoop Vincent	Aadhi Shankaran / Aadhi				Main	Vasavadatha and Shankaran's only son. Meenakshi's husband.
Rajesh Paravoor	Sahadevan Krishnan / Sahu		Main	Main	Main	Mayavathi's son. Vidhubala's husband.
Shalu Kurian	Vidhubala Sahadevan / Vidhu		Main	Main	Main	Mayavathi's second daughter in law. Sahadevan's wife.
Riyas Narmakala	Maheendar Singh				Main	Madhuri Amma's husband, Arjunan, Nakulan, Sahadevan and Kokila's uncle.

=== Recurring cast ===
Actor	Character	Seasons			Note
Actor	Character	1	2	3	Note
Veena Nair	Kokilakshi Shishupalan/ Kokila	Recurring	Recurring	Recurring	Arjunan's sister. Mayavathi's only daughter
Sreelatha Namboothiri	Komalavalliamma	Recurring	Recurring	Recurring	Mohanavalli's mother
Kochu Preman	Madhevan / Ammavan	Recurring	Recurring		Mayavathi's brother
Rashmi Anil	Susheela	Recurring		Recurring	A fish seller, paternal aunt of Rosamma
Kavita	Mallika	Recurring			Rich and jealous old neighbour of Mayavati's family, an impostor to Arjunan's poems
Murugan	Shishubalan / Shishu	Guest	Guest		Kokilakshi's husband
Harisree Yousaf	Nakulan	Guest			Arjunan's brother and Mayavathi's son
Maneesha K. Subrahmaniam	Vasavadattha		Recurring	Recurring	Adhi's mother and Meenakshi's mother in law
Parvathy Lal	Rosamma		Also starring	Also starring	Kannan's girlfriend, later wife
Nandakishor Nellickal	Pravasi Shankaran		Recurring	Recurring	Adhi's father and Meenakshi's father in law
Thushara Nambiar	Shakuntala		Recurring		Arjunan's neighbour
Unni Nair	Ambooty		Recurring	Recurring	Vidhubala's father
Arun G Arun	Chakkara/ Chakkaraparambil Arun		Recurring	Recurring	Kannan's friend
Anitha Nair	Thankamani/ Thanku		Recurring	Recurring	Kamalasanan's wife
Dhatri	Chinnu		Recurring	Recurring	Sahadevan and Vidhubala's daughter
Aadhish Sudhakaran	Chikku		Recurring	Recurring	Sahadevan and Vidhubala's son
Vaishnav Menon	Chinnan		Guest	Guest	Sahadevan and Vidhubala's son
Anumol R. S	Chakki		Guest		Adhi's cousin

=== Additional guests ===
- Kaviyoor Ponnamma as herself, and Krishnan Vakkeel's co-star in a film (Season 1: Ep. 108)
- Vishnu Unnikrishnan as himself (Season 2: Epi 189)
- Bibin George as himself (Season 2: Epi 189)
- K. T. S. Padannayil as Mohanavalli's uncle (Season 1: Ep 276)
- Promy as Subru(Arjunan’s friend)
- Nitha Promy as Rukku (Subru’s wife)
- Vivek Pillay as Richard Buttenhole (Sahadevan’s friend)
- Archana Menon as Adv. Kamala, Mohanavalli's friend (Season 1: Episode 306)
- Mintu Maria Vincent as Mrunalini
- Sini Prasad as Annamma Chacko, Arjunan's strict, new boss, executive engineer (Season 2: 313,314)

=== Former cast ===
- Bhagyalakshmi Prabhu as Meenakshi; Mohanavalli and Arjunan's daughter. Mayavathi and Kommalavalli's granddaughter. Kannan's elder sister. Aadhi's wife.
- Sagar Surya as Aadhi Shankaran / Aadhi; Vasavadatha and Shankaran's Only son. Meenakshi's husband.
- Sethu Lakshmi as Komalavally, Mohanavally's mother

== Production ==
=== Season 1 ===
K. P. A. C. Lalitha and Manju Pillai play the role of the mother-in-law and the daughter-in-law respectively. The mother-in-law outwits her daughter-in-law and is always ready to start a fight with her and the daughter-in-law rises to the occasion. Jayakumar plays Manju's husband who is a government officer unwilling to go to work and who lives on his mother's pension. Their children Kannan and Meenakshi were played by real-life siblings Siddharth and Bhagyalakshmi Prabhu. They were cast after the show creators were impressed by their performance in the reality TV show Veruthe Alla Bharya on Mazhavil Manorama, in which their parents were contestants. Bhagyalakshmi was studying in class 11 when she received the offer, she is a nursing graduate in real-life and in the show too. The children are one of the main attractions in the series as they frequently instigate fights between the two women. Naseer Sankranthi plays the role of Kamalasanan who is the best friend of Mahakavi Arjunan (Arjunan) and old classmate of Sahadevan, who boasts that he will be the Panchayat Member in the upcoming years.

== Reception ==
The series is successful. Thatteem Mutteem is considered special because the show is recorded using "spot dialogue". This technique creates a natural sound and appearance. The artists behave as in real situations. In addition, the performance is natural and simple and the series is related to the current reality that led to its success.

== Awards ==
Year	Award	Category	Recipient	Result
2013	Kerala State Television Awards	Best Comedy Programme	Thatteem Mutteem	Won
2015	Kerala State Television Awards	Best Comedy Programme		
2015	Kerala State Television Awards	Best Comedian	Naseer Sankranthi	Won
2016	Flowers Television Award	Best Serial-Comedy	Thatteem Mutteem	Won
2017	Flowers Television Award	Best Comedy Artist	Manju Pillai	Won
2017	Flowers Television Award	Best Comedy Artist	Jayakumar Parameswaran Pillai	Nominated
2019	Janmabhoomi Awards	Best Comedy artist	Manju Pillai	Won
2019	Janmabhoomi Awards	Best Comedy artist	Jayakumar Parameswaran Pillai	Won
2020	Kerala State Television Awards	Best Comedian	Naseer Sankranthi	Won
