= Munnodi =

2017 Tamil language film by SPTA Kumar

- Directed by: SPTA Kumar
- Written by: SPTA Kumar
- Produced by: Soham Agrawal; SPTA Rajasekhar
- Starring: Harish; Yamini Bhaskar
- Music by: K Prabu Shankar
- Production company: Swastik Cine Vision
- Distributed by: Escape Artists Motion Pictures
- Release date: 2 June 2017
- Country: India
- Language: Tamil

Munnodi (transl. Pioneer) is a 2017 Tamil-language masala film written and directed by SPTA Kumar. The film stars Harish and Yamini Bhaskar in the lead roles, marking their Tamil debuts. Malayalam actors Sijoy Varghese, Arjuna, Ranjith Velayudhan, and Pavel Navageethan play supporting roles. The music was composed by K Prabu Shankar. The film was released on 2 June 2017 to negative reviews.

== Cast ==
- Harish as Sathya
- Yamini Bhaskar as Denuka
- Arjuna as Aravind
- Sijoy Varghese as Soundarapandian
- Ranjith Velayudhan as Mandhiramoorthy
- Pavel Navageethan as Jayaveeran
- Sithara as Sathya's mother
- Suja Varunee
- Niranjan
- Suman
- Suresh
- Vinu Krithik
- Raja Rani Pandian
- Mippu
- Winner Ramachandran
- Boys Rajan as Doctor

== Production ==
Telugu actors Harish and Yamini Bhaskar are making their Tamil debut in this film. Malayalam actor Sijoy Varghese was chosen for the role of a police officer after the makers watched him in Avatharam and appreciated him for the role. The film was shot in Chennai, Madhrai, Tirunelveli and Thoothukudi. Arjuna, who appeared in Tamil and Telugu films, was signed to play one of the three main leads alongside Harish and Varghese.

== Soundtrack ==
The songs were composed by K Prabu Shankar.

Munnodi

Soundtrack album by K. Venkat Prabu Shankar
- Released: 2017
- Length: 21:30
- Language: Tamil
- Label: TrendMusic

K. Venkat Prabu Shankar chronology
Jambulingam 3D (2016)	Munnodi (2017)

Track listing
No.	Title	Lyrics	Singer(s)	Length
1.	"Muttakari"	SPTA Kumar	Velmurugan, Janaki Iyer	5:09
2.	"Akkam Pakkam"	SPTA Kumar	Sooraj Santhosh, Remya Nambeesan	5:05
3.	"Enna Idhu"	SPTA Kumar	Haricharan	5:26
4.	"Deivam Thandha"		Madhu Balakrishnan	2:55
5.	"Munnodi (Theme) [Instrumental]"		K. Prabu Sankar	2:55
Total length:				21:30

== Reception ==
The Deccan Chronicle wrote that "The movie starts off with an interesting note, loses its sheen due to the lackluster romantic track and the clichéd friends gang who does the routine thing of boozing, dancing and helping the hero out in his love life". The Times of India wrote that "The actors, too, are very artificial and the director's writing lets him and his movie down".
