= Oru Chiri Iru Chiri Bumper Chiri =

Malayalam comedy reality show

- Also known as: Bumper Chiri
- Genre: Comedy Reality
- Developed by: Mazhavil Manorama
- Creative director: Sruthi Pillai
- Presented by: Karthik Surya
- Judges: Manju Pillai; Kottayam Naseer; Ramesh Pisharody
- Country of origin: India
- Original language: Malayalam
- No. of seasons: 3
- No. of episodes: 1500+

Production
- Producer: Satheesh Kumar
- Camera setup: Multi-camera
- Running time: Approx. 52 minutes

Original release
- Network: Mazhavil Manorama
- Release: 19 April 2021 – present

Oru Chiri Iru Chiri Bumper Chiri (widely known as Bumper Chiri) is an Indian comedy reality show which premiered on Mazhavil Manorama channel and ManoramaMAX OTT platform. The show is hosted by vlogger-turned host, Karthik Surya and has a 3-member permanent judging panel, Manju Pillai, Naseer Sankranthi and Sabumon Abdusamad.

The show has three seasons. The first season aired from 19 April 2021 to 14 April 2023 for 516 episodes. The second season aired from 12 June 2023 to 30 November 2025 for 774 episodes. The third season started airing from 26 January 2026. It is one of the longest running television reality show in Malayalam.

== Series overview ==
Series	Episodes	Originally released	
Series	Episodes	First released	Last released
1	516	19 April 2021	14 April 2023
2	774	12 June 2023	30 November 2025
3	210+	26 January 2026	present

== Overview ==
Participants must entertain the judges and the audience with their sense of humour in order to win various cash prizes and rewards. The contestants are judged on their ability to make the judges laugh. The judges award each contestant with one, two, or three laughs, depending on how funny they find the contestant's performance. The contestant who receives the most laughs at the end of the show wins the maximum prize money.

== Cast ==
=== Permanent judges ===
- Manju Pillai
- Bibin George
- Ramesh Pisharody

=== Recurring judges ===
- Mallika Sukumaran
- Miya George
- Naseer Sankranthi
- Kottayam Naseer
- Sabumon Abdusamad
- Dharmajan Bolgatty
- Janardhanan
- Ambika
- Guiness Pakru
- Kalabhavan Navas
- Menaka
- Arya

=== Hosts ===
- Karthik Surya

=== Recurring Hosts ===
- Devika Nambiar
- Arya
- Meenakshi Raveendran
- Aswin Vijayan

== Reception ==
The show is one of the most popular reality show since its start. The first season successfully completed 516 episodes. Due to its high popularity second season was started just two months after first season's finale. Teaser of the show reminding Avatar became viral on social media.

== Spin-offs ==
A spin-off comedy reality show Bumper Chiri Aaghosham is aired on Mazhavil Manorama from 23 October 2021 to 21 August 2022 for 84 episodes. Manju Pillai, Naseer Sankranthi and Sabumon Abdusamad reprised as judges. It is hosted by Karthik Surya and later replaced by Devika Nambiar. Apart from comedy skits, this show also provides a platform for dancers and other special talents to showcase their talents.

Another spin-off, titled Bumper Chiri Unlimited Chiri aired on Mazhavil Manorama from 1 December 2025 to 25 January 2026 for 55 episodes. The show had two judging panels: Arya, Noby Marcose and Bibin George on weekdays, and Kottayam Naseer, Ramesh Pisharody and Manju Pillai on weekends. It is hosted by Karthik Surya and Meenakshi Sudheer. Contestants perform comedy acts that are judged using a “Chiri Meter.” Weekday winners advance to the weekend episode, where they compete for a ₹2.5 lakh prize.

== Awards and nominations ==
Year	Award	Category	Nominee	Result	Ref.
2025	Kerala State Television Awards	Best Comedy Program	Oru Chiri Iru Chiri Bumper Chiri (Season 2)	Won	
2025	3rd Kerala Vision Television Awards	Best Non Fiction Show	Oru Chiri Iru Chiri Bumper Chiri (Season 2)	Won	
2026	4th Kerala Vision Television Awards	Best Television Host	Karthik Surya	Won	
