= Velukkakka Oppu Ka =

- Directed by: Ashok R Klatha
- Starring: Indrans; M R Madhu Babu
- Release date: 6 July 2021
- Country: India
- Language: Malayalam

Velukkakka Oppu Ka is a 2021 Indian Malayalam-language film starring Indrans. The film was released on 6 July 2021 on video on demand on platforms like BookMyShow Stream, first shows and zeestreams. The movie is also the directional debut of Ashok R. Kalitha.

== Cast ==
- Indrans as Velukkakka
- M R Madhu Babu
- Naseer Sankranthi
- Saju Navodaya
