= Manju Pillai =

Indian actress

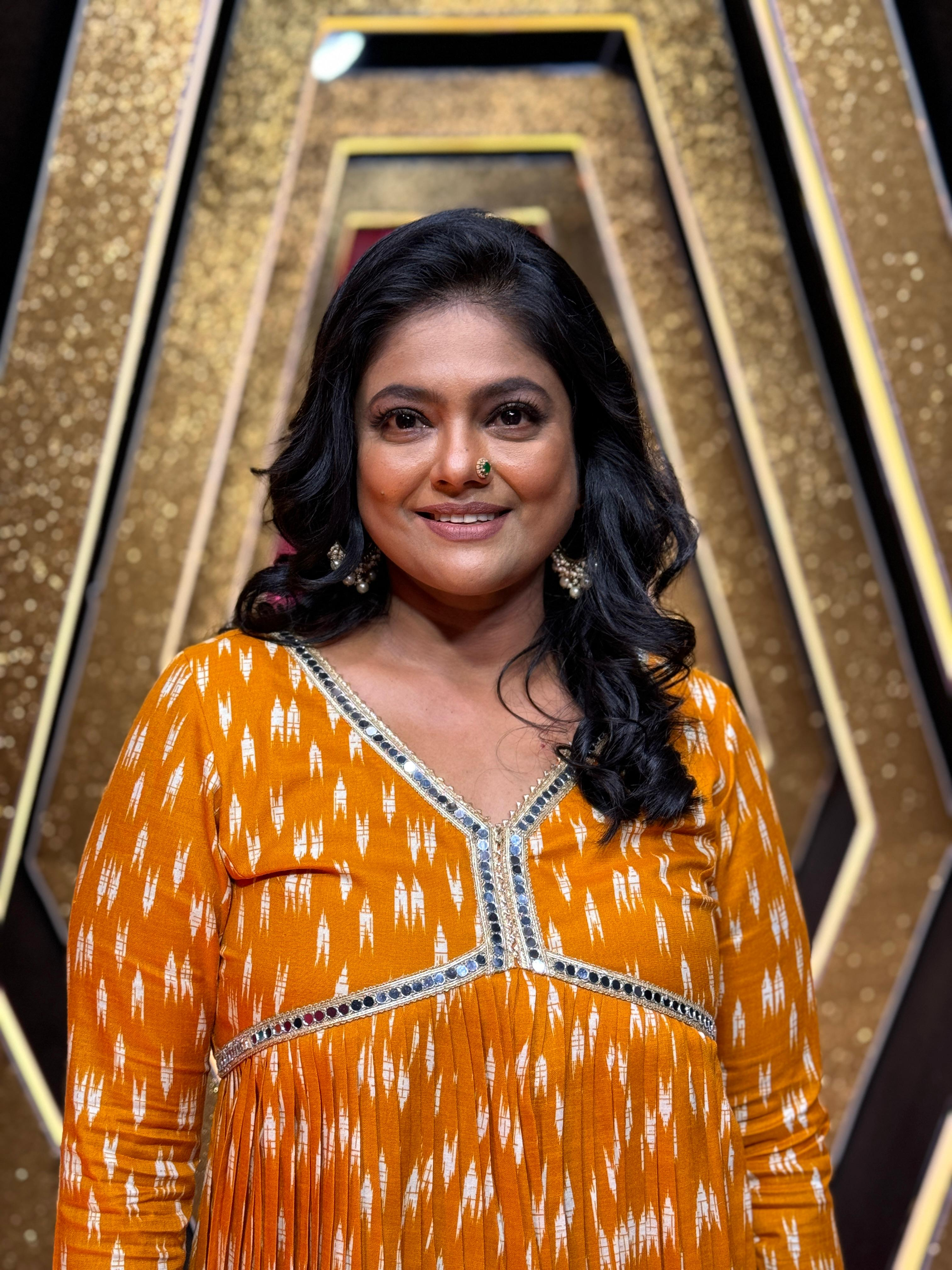
- Occupations: Actress; TV host
- Years active: 1991–present
- Spouse: Sujith Vaassudev (m. 2000; div. 2024)
- Children: 1
- Relatives: S. P. Pillai (grandfather)

Manju Pillai is an Indian actress who appears in Malayalam films and television shows. She is best known for portraying comedic roles to character roles.

== Personal life ==
Manju Pillai is the granddaughter of Malayalam film actor S. P. Pillai. She did her undergraduate studies from Mar Ivanios College, Thiruvananthapuram. She married cinematographer Sujith Vaassudev on 23 December 2000 and later divorced in 2024. They have a daughter Daya Sujith.

== Career ==
Manju first acted in the television serial Sathyavum Mithyayum. In 2000 and 2001, Manju won the Kerala State Television Award for Best Supporting Actress for V. N. Mohandas's serial Devaranjini and Venu Nair's Sethuvinte Kathakal. She won the Film Critics' Award the same year. In 2002–2003, she again won the State Award for the best television actress for Ali Akbar's Sundaranmarum Sundarikalum.

== Filmography ==
=== Films ===
Year	Title	Role	Notes
1992	Sabarimalayil Thanka Sooryodayam	Chandran Pillai's daughter	
1993	Golanthara Vartha	Lekha's neighbor	
1994	Galileo		
1995	Mazhayethum Munpe	Anjana	
1996	Kaathil Oru Kinnaram	Usha	
1996	Excuse Me Ethu Collegila	Gayathri	
1997	Irattakuttikalude Achan	Indira	
1997	Janathipathyam	Thirumulpadu's wife	
1997	Guru Sishyan	Sarasu	
1997	Nee Varuvolam	Santha	
1997	Raajathanthram	Shari	
1998	Ayushman Bhava	Dance Teacher	
1998	Kattathoru Penpoovu	Leela	
1999	Njangal Santhushtaranu	Kamakshi	
2000	Vinayapoorvam Vidhyaadharan	Rexy	
2000	Snegithiye	Police Constable	Tamil film
2000	Swayamvara Panthal	Seema	
2000	Mister Butler	Anandham	
2001	Raavanaprabhu	Kumudam	
2007	Naalu Pennungal	Chinnu Amma	
2007	Raakilipattu	Police Constable	
2009	Raamanam	Kadashi Paathu	
2010	Manmadhan Ambu	Manju Kurup	Tamil film
2011	Teja Bhai & Family	Rathi Devi	
2013	Kadal Kadannu Oru Maathukutty	Herself	
2014	Jalamsham	Soshakutty	
2015	Kaliyachan	Kunjiraman's mother	
2015	Love 24x7	Jessica Moses	
2015	Ammakkoru Tharattu		
2016	James & Alice	Advocate Rohini	
2018	Autorsha	Herself	(Cameo in promo song)
2018	Nithyaharitha Nayakan	Omana	
2021	Home	Kuttiyamma	
2021	Kolaambi	Lawyer	
2022	Headmaster	Teacher's wife	
2022	Jaya Jaya Jaya Jaya Hey	Court Judge	
2022	The Teacher	Kalyani	
2023	Oh My Darling	Meritta	
2023	Higuita		
2023	Falimy	Rema Chandran	
2024	Vivekanandan Viralanu	Ammini	
2024	Malayalee From India	Suma	
2024	Grrr	Fauziya Fathima	
2024	Swargam	Aniyamma	
2024	Oru Anweshanathinte Thudakkam	Mollykutty	
2025	Prince and Family	Safiya	
2025	United Kingdom of Kerala	Rosamma	
2025	Adinaasam Vellapokkam	Principal	
2026	Lurk †	TBA	

=== Other works ===
Year	Title	Role	Notes
2020	Keralam Gathi Mattum	Herself	Music video
2020	Lockdown Bros	Manju aunty	Web Series
2021	DK	Annie	Short film
2021	Ohm Sthuthiyayi Erikatte	Jessy's sister	Web Series
2022	My Life My Choice	Herself	Special video

== Television ==
=== Serials ===
Year	Title	Role	Channel
2021	Madhavi Naadu Vaanidum Kalam	Madhavi	Kaumudy TV
2016	Marimayam	Mohanavally	Mazhavil Manorama
2012–2023	Thatteem Mutteem	Mohanavally	Mazhavil Manorama
2011-2012	Manassu Parayunna Karyangal	Annapurna/ Thalaivi	Mazhavil Manorama
2011-2012	Pattukallude Pattu	Sindhu	Surya TV
	Kudumbapuranam	Shari	Jaihind TV
2009-2010	Mazhayariyathe		Surya TV
	Smarakasilakal	Pathu	DD Malayalam
2009	Devimahathmyam	Devika	Asianet
2008	Nirmalyam	Sethulakshmi	Asianet
2005	Indhumukhi Chandramathi	Indhumukhi	Surya TV
2007-2008	Sanamanassulavarkku Samadhanam		Asianet
2007	Prayaanam		Surya TV
2007	Women's Club		
2009-2010	Katha Parayum Kavyanjali	Pavizham	Surya TV
2006	Sathi Leelavathi	Leelavathi	Amrita TV
2006	Ivide Ellavarkkum Sukham		Asianet
2004-2005	Koodum Thedi		Asianet
2004-2005	Kavyanjali	Pavizham	Surya TV
2004-2005	Life Is Beautiful	Sulochana Vishwanathan (Sulu)	Asianet
2003	Instant Padam	Sulochana	Kairali TV
2002-2004	Chila Kudumba Chitrangal	Sulochana Vishwanathan (Sulu)	Kairali TV
2002	Sooryakanthi		DD Malayalam
2003	Sathyavum Mithyayum		DD Malayalam
2001	Devaranjini		DD Malayalam
2001	Sethuvinte Kadhakal	Lakshmi	DD Malayalam
2001	Sundharanmarum Sundharikallum		DD Malayalam
2000	Thali	Hema	Surya TV
1998-1999	Sthree	auto baby	Asianet
1997	Marannam Dhurbhalam		DD Malayalam
	Rareeram		DD Malayalam
	Veendum Chila Veetukaryangal		DD Malayalam
	Eka Tharakam		DD Malayalam
1995	Seemanthanam		DD Malayalam
	Marubhoomiyil Pookkalam		DD Malayalam
1994	Scooter		DD Malayalam
	Murappennu		DD Malayalam
	Thamarakuzhali	Lakshmi	DD Malayalam
	Soumini		DD Malayalam
	Koodum Thedi		
	Thathamme Poocha Poocha		

=== Television shows ===
Year	Title	Role	Channel
2010	Vodafone Comedy Stars	Judge	Asianet
2010	Super Dupe	Judge	Amrita TV
2012	Comedy Festival	Judge	Mazhavil Manorama
2012	Veruthe Alla Bharya	Judge	Mazhavil Manorama
2013	Kinginikoottam	Host	Asianet Plus
2013-2015	Pokkiri Peekkiri	Host	Asianet Plus
2015	Thani Nadan	Presenter	Mazhavil Manorama
2016	Laughing Villa	House owners wife	Surya TV
2016	D3 - D 4 Dance	Mentor	Surya TV
2017	Malayali Veetamma	Judge	Flowers TV
2017	Grand Magical Circus	Judge	Kaumudy TV
2018	Comedy Stars Plus	Judge	Asianet Plus
2018	Comedy Utsavam	Judge	Flowers TV
2018	Super Dupe 2	Judge	Flowers TV
2018	Mimicry Mahamela	Mentor	Mazhavil Manorama
2018	Tamar Padar	Mentor	Mazhavil Manorama
2020	Ruchimelam	Presenter	ACV
2020-2021	Comedy Stars	Judge	Asianet
2021	Udan Panam 3. 0	Contestant	Mazhavil Manorama
2021	Midumudukki	Judge	Flowers TV
2021–2023	Oru Chiri Iru Chiri Bumper Chiri	Judge	Mazhavil Manorama
2021	Atham Pathu Ruchi 2021	Presenter	Mazhavil Manorama
2021	Red Carpet	Mentor	Amrita TV
2021–2022	Bumper Chiri Agosham	Judge	Mazhavil Manorama
2022	Panam Tharum Padam	Contestant	Mazhavil Manorama
2023–2025	Oru Chiri Iru Chiri Bumper Chiri 2	Judge	Mazhavil Manorama
2025-2026	Bumper Chiri Unlimited Chiri	Judge	Mazhavil Manorama
2026–present	Oru Chiri Iru Chiri Bumper Chiri 3	Judge	Mazhavil Manorama

=== Advertisements ===
- Mazhavil Manorama
- Mazhavil FM
- Samson & Samson Lifestyle
- Maa Washing Powder
- Mahilaratnam Magazine
- Asian Paints Ultima Protek

=== Other works ===
- Chithrageetham
- Amma Mazhavillu
- Day with a star
- Annie's Kitchen
- Funny Nights with Pearle Maaney
- Katha Ethuvare
- Manasilloru Mazhavillu
- Light & Sound Drama - Sthreeparvam
- Manorama Newsmaker
- Vanitha Magazine
- Shubharathri
- Idavelayil
- Little World
- Amma Shows
- Take It Easy
- Morning Guest
- Ividinganannu Bhai
- Hello Namasthe
- Namasthe Keralam
- Malayali Durbar
- JB Junction
- Cinema Chirima
- Bellari Manjuvum Bumper Onavum
- My Favourites
- Comedy Super Nite
- Orikkal Koodi
- 1.1.3
- Radio Mango
- Fast Track
- Badayi Bunglawu
- Malayala Manorama
- Lalitham 50
- Nakshathrathilakkam
- Manjubhashitham
- Utsavam Superstar
- Chat Show
- Star Chat
- Morning Guest
- Tamasha Bazar
- Morning Reporter
- Talk Time
- Mazhavil Azhakil Amma
- ABC -Artists Big Chat
- Satvika
- Snehathalam
- Cinema One
- Manju Pillakkoppam Chila Kudumbachithrangal
- Breakfast News
- Hello My Dear Wrong Number (Radio)
- Spotlight
- Tharapakittu

== Awards ==
Flowers Television Award

- 2016: Best comedian for Thatteem muttem

Janmabhoomi awards

- 2019: Best Comedy artist for Thatteem muttem

Kerala Film Critics Association Awards

- 2022: Best second actress for Home

SIIMA Awards

- 2024:Best supporting actress - Malayalam for Falimy

Vanitha Film Awards

- 2024:Best Supporting actress for Falimy

Mazhavil Entertainment Awards

- 2024:Best entertainment - Character role for Falimy
