= Karthik Surya =

Indian YouTuber

Karthik Chandran
- Born: 1 June 1993 (age 33); Thiruvanathapuram, Kerala, India
- Occupations: YouTuber; Television anchor

YouTube information
- Channels: Karthik Surya; Intelerks Podcast
- Years active: 2017–present
- Genres: Entertainment; vlog; podcast
- Subscribers: 3.29 Million
- Views: 1.3 Billion
- Last updated: July 2026

Karthik Surya (born 1 June 1993) is an Indian YouTuber and television anchor from Trivandrum, India. He is known for his YouTube vlogs and hosting the television programme Oru Chiri Iru Chiri Bumper Chiri broadcast on Mazhavil Manorama.

== Life and career ==
Karthik Surya hails from Chellamangalam, Thiruvananthapuram, Kerala, India.

He started the YouTube channel in 2011. However he did his first YouTube vlog in 2017.

Later, he quit his job as a business development manager at Technopark to become a full-time vlogger.

In 2021, he was selected as the host of the Mazhavil Manorama programme Oru Chiri Iru Chiri Bumper Chiri.

Karthik is the first lifestyle YouTube vlogger from Kerala.

== Television ==
List of television credits
Year	Program	Channel	Role
2020	Comedy Stars	Asianet	Guest
2021–2023	Oru Chiri Iru Chiri Bumper Chiri	Mazhavil Manorama	Host
2021–2022	Bumper Chiri Aaghosham	Mazhavil Manorama	Host
2023–2025	Oru Chiri Iru Chiri Bumper Chiri 2	Mazhavil Manorama	Host
2023	The Next Top Anchor	ManoramaMAX; Mazhavil Manorama	Judge
2025-2026	Bumper Chiri Unlimited Chiri	Mazhavil Manorama	Host
2026-present	Oru Chiri Iru Chiri Bumper Chiri 3	Mazhavil Manorama	Host

== Awards ==
Year	Award	Category	Result	Ref.
2021	24 News Social Media Awards	Best Lifestyle Vlogger	Won	
2026	4th Kerala Vision Television Awards	Best Television Host	Won	

== See also ==
- List of YouTubers
- Firoz Chuttipara
