= The Car (1997 film) =

- Directed by: Rajasenan
- Written by: Rafi Mecartin; Rajan Kiriyath; Vinu Kiriyath
- Produced by: Ajith, Devi Ajith
- Starring: Jayaram; Janardhanan; Sreelakshmi; Kalabhavan Mani; Indrans
- Cinematography: Anandakuttan
- Edited by: K. P. Hariharaputhran
- Release date: 3 October 1997
- Running time: 132 minutes
- Country: India
- Language: Malayalam

The Car (Malayalam: ദി കാർ) is a 1997 crime comedy Malayalam film directed by Rajasenan, and starring Jayaram, Janardhanan, Kalabhavan Mani, and Sreelakshmi.

This film is about two co-workers and roommates, who win a car in a contest. The car has a license plate number identical to that of a failed assassin. The new car's owner is arrested for the crime of the assassin, and soon tries to protect an heiress targeted by the assassination plot.

== Plot ==
Mahadevan and Kumaran work in a small firm and are roommates, renting from Janakiamma. One day, luck comes to them when Mahadevan wins a car as the first prize of a promotional contest held by a washing-powder brand. Meanwhile, a murderer, Ambrose is after Maya. By mistake, both the murderer and Mahadevan get the same tag number on their cars' license plates. The murderers try a hit-and-run attack on Maya, but she escapes. She thinks that Mahadevan was behind the attack. Mahadevan gets arrested by sub-inspector Cherian according to Maya's complaint.

But due to lack of proper evidence, he's released with a warning. After getting through problems one after another, Mahadevan finds the real killers and their car. He tells Maya about the killers who attempted for her life. Shockingly it is revealed that one of the killers is Maya's cousin Vishnu who is after her wealth. Vishnu tries to kill Maya, but Mahadevan stops him. In an attempt to kill Mahadevan and Maya, Vishnu accidentally dies by being stabbed by a sharp object during the fight. In an attempt to dump his body, the couple is stopped by Vishnu's accomplice, Ambrose. He's enraged by his friend's death and tries to kill Mahadevan and Maya, but ends up at the dead end of the road, where the cops were waiting for him with an armed force. The car catches fire from the gunshots and explodes, killing him. The film ends with sub-inspector Cherian thanking Mahadevan and Maya, for their help and support.

== Cast ==
- Jayaram as Mahadevan
- Janardhanan as Kumaran / Kumarettan, Mahadevan's friend
- Sreelakshmi as Maya, Mahadevan's love interest
- Kalabhavan Mani as Sub-inspector Cherian
- Chandhu as Vishnu, Maya's cousin
- Indrans as Constable Idiyan Vikraman
- Meena as Janakiyamma, Mahadevan and Kumaran's house owner
- Bindu Panicker as Usha, Maya's friend and roommate
- Poojappura Ravi as Koshy
- Kochu Preman as Valiyakulam Swamy / Kochappi, Janakiyamma's husband
- K. P. Ummer as Maya's grandfather's advocate
- Kalamandalam Kesavan as Maya's grandfather
- Abu Salim as Ambrose, Vishnu's friend
- Mahima as Malathi, Janakiyamma's daughter
- Sona Nair as Beena
- Jayakumar Parameswaran Pillai as Babu, autorickshaw driver
- Bindu Murali as motorcyclist

== Soundtrack ==
The film's soundtrack contains 6 songs, all composed by Sanjeev Lal and Lyrics by S. Ramesan Nair.

#	Title	Singer(s)
1	"Kalichirithan"	K. J. Yesudas, K. S. Chitra
2	"Kalichirithan"	K. J. Yesudas
3	"Kalichirithan"	K. S. Chitra
4	"Kamaladalam"	Biju Narayanan, K. S. Chitra
5	"Kamaladalam"	K. J. Yesudas, K. S. Chitra
6	"Rajayogam Swanthamayi"	Biju Narayanan

== Box office ==
The film was an average grosser.
