= Sri Ram (film) =

- DVD cover
- Directed by: M. S. Ramesh
- Written by: M. S. Ramesh R. Rajashekhar (Dialogues)
- Screenplay by: M. S. Ramesh, R. Rajashekhar
- Based on: Ramayana epic
- Produced by: K. P. Sreekanth, Srinivas Kanakapura
- Starring: Shiva Rajkumar; Ankitha; Abhirami; Hema Choudhary; Srinivasa Murthy; Avinash
- Cinematography: H. C. Venugopal
- Edited by: S. Manohar
- Music by: Gurukiran
- Production company: R. S. Productions
- Release date: 29 May 2003
- Running time: 155 minutes
- Country: India
- Language: Kannada

Sri Ram is a 2003 Indian Kannada-language action drama film directed by M. S. Ramesh and starring Shiva Rajkumar, Abhirami and Ankitha (in her Kannada debut). The flashback portion of the film was noted to have been based on The Ramayana but was criticized for adopting formulaic narration style found in Telugu movies like Samarasimha Reddy (1999), Narasimha Naidu (2001) and Indra (2002). The movie was a success at the box office.

== Plot ==
Aishwarya "Aishu", is the only daughter of Lokayukta DCP Kshetrapal. She travels to Hubli to attend the marriage of her friend, Chitra's sister, where she happens to meet Shivanna and falls in love with him. Shivanna works as a servant in Chitra's family for two years and his sincerity and loyalty has made the orphaned Shivanna a member of their family.

Kshetrapal who reaches Mandya threatens to take action against a wealthy landlord, Shankarappa, unless he pays the penalty for violating the laws and fooling the government causing the latter to plot against him. Through Muniyappa, a building contractor who was also insulted by Kshetrapal, Shankarappa meets Durgegowda whose help he seeks in kidnapping Aishu. Durgegowda who has a long-standing rivalry with Chitra's family and Shivanna takes it as the right opportunity to strike back. However, Shivanna manages to rescue her.

Not ready to give up, Shankarappa assigns goons to kill Kshetrapal. Shivanna who travels to Bangalore to meet Aishu happens to save him. After learning that even Shivanna loves Aishu, her father arranges their marriage. On the day of marriage, Aishu's old friend Vasundhara appears but refuses to believe that the groom is Shivanna since his name happens to be Sri Ram. The film cuts to a flashback.

In a village in Mandya, Satyanand and Shankarappa are the two prominent landlords. Satyanand has two wives and three sons, the eldest being Sri Ram who live together in peace and harmony just like Dasharatha and his family. Ram and his brothers force Shankarappa's only brother into marrying a servant girl whom he had molested and impregnated. A vendetta driven Shankarappa uses Chakratheertha, Vasundhara's father and Satya's brother-in-law to oust Ram from the village. Chakratheertha manages to persuade Parvathy, Satya's second wife to force Satya to banish Ram from the village so as to allow him to invest the family wealth in a business after a huge crisis planned by Shankarappa forces Satya's family to take drastic measures. Respecting his step mother's decision, Ram leaves the village promising to never return. Vasundhara is shocked to know that her father has cancelled her marriage with Ram and fixed her alliance with Parvathy's first born, Bharath. Even Bharath is shocked and refuses to oblige by his mother's decision. Nemesis falls as Chakratheertha manages to usurp the wealth and expel his sister and her family from their palatial house.

The story returns to the present. Sri Ram's brothers who had desperately been searching for him for the past few years traces him to the wedding hall and convinces him to return to their native place. Shivanna returns as Sri Ram and after a fight with Shankarappa and his henchman manages to reclaim his property. He also punishes Chaktratheertha. The family is united and Sri Ram is now pursued by both Aishu and Vasu to marry them just like his father has two wives from which he tries to escape.

== Cast ==
- Shiva Rajkumar as Sri Ram / Shivanna
- Ankitha as Aishwarya "Aishu"
- Abhirami as Vasundhara "Vasu"
- Srinivasa Murthy as Satyanand "Satya"
- Hema Chaudhary as Parvathy "Paru"
- Sumithra as Sri Ram's mother
- Avinash as Lokayuktha DCP Kshetrapal
- Jai Jagadish as Muniyappa
- Rangayana Raghu as Chakratheertha
- Sathyajith as Servant

== Production ==
Though announced as Shivarajkumar's 75th movie, it was his 71st movie in the order of release. The film's muhurat took place at the ISKCON Temple, Bangalore with Dr. Rajkumar and Parvathamma Rajkumar in attendance. The film's story is inspired by Rama's journey to the vanavas in Ramayana.

== Soundtrack ==
The music was composed by Gurukiran and released by Ashwini Recording Company.

Sri Ram

Soundtrack album by Gurukiran
- Released: June 19, 2003
- Recorded: 2003
- Genre: Soundtrack
- Length: 21:59
- Label: Ashwini Recording Company
- Producer: Gurukiran

Gurukiran chronology
Panchali (2003)	Sri Ram (2003)	Khushi (2003)

Track list
No.	Title	Lyrics	Singer(s)	Length
1.	"Ela Neene Thaaye"	V. Nagendra Prasad	Shankar Mahadevan	4:53
2.	"Nanoba Dandanayaka"	V. Nagendra Prasad	Mano	3:49
3.	"Prema Bana"	V. Nagendra Prasad	Suresh Wadkar, Kavita Krishnamurthy	4:21
4.	"Rama Ayo Rama"	Bhangi Ranga	Udit Narayan, Anuradha Sriram	4:15
5.	"Suma Sumana"	V. Manohar	Udit Narayan, Sowmya Raoh	4:41
Total length:				21:59

== Release ==
Since no films were released on 8 August 2003 due to a tussle between producers and exhibitors, prints of this film were removed from Santhosh Theatre, Bangalore.

== Reception ==
A critic from indiainfo.com wrote that "Nevertheless a timepass, good effort by the director".
