= Rajesh Sharma (Malayalam actor) =

Indian actor (born 1973)

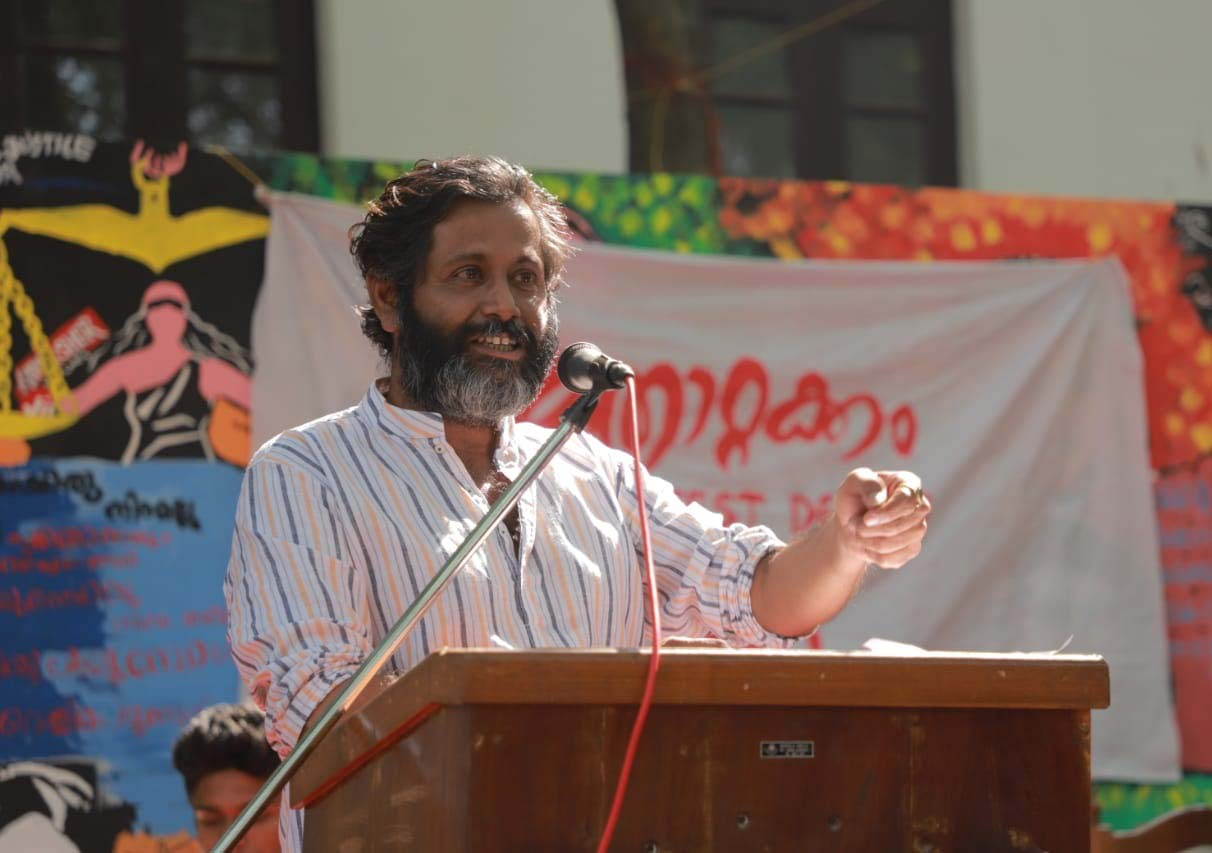
- Born: Kollam, Kerala, India
- Occupation: Actor
- Years active: 2005–present
- Spouse: Rashmi Ramachandran
- Children: 1
- Parent(s): Jayantha Sharma, Jayalakshmi

Rajesh Sharma is an Indian actor, who appears in Malayalam films.

== Filmography ==
Year	Title	Role	Notes
2005	Saira		
2009	Evidam Swargamanu	Camera man	
2013	Annayum Rasoolum	Palisha Pranchi	
2013	Kanyaka Talkies		
2014	Homely Meals	Palarivattom Mosappan	
2015	Mariyam Mukku	Mickle	
2015	Oru Vadakkan Selfie	Sakhav Divakaran	
2015	Saigal Padukayanu	Narendran	
2015	Loham		
2015	Ben	Fr. Jose Murikkumpuzha	
2015	Charlie	Seban	
2016	Aanandam	Josettan	
2016	Kappiri Thuruthu	Kannan Anthruman	
2017	Ezra	Sabatti	
2017	Ayaal Sassi	Kavi Sreedharan Potti	
2018	Eeda	Unnikrishnan	
2018	Bonsai	Chemban	
2018	Swathanthryam Ardharathriyil	Prabhu (Jail warden)	
2018	Thobama	Mani	
2018	Theevandi	Damodaran	
2018	Vada Chennai	Chanchal	Tamil film
2018	Joseph	Viswanathan	
2018	Contessa	Pappan	
2019	Vijay Superum Pournamiyum	Doctor	
2019	Kodathi Samaksham Balan Vakeel	Sudarshan	
2019	Ottam	Suni	
2019	Sigai	Chetta	Tamil film; Released on ZEE5
2019	Kakshi: Amminippilla	Senior Party Member	
2019	Luca	Sivan	
2019	Thelivu	Shenai	
2019	Ganagandharvan	Rajan chettan	
2019	Odunnon		
2019	Shibu	Satheesh Kupleri	
2019	Stand Up	Diya's father	
2021	Sumesh and Ramesh		
2021	Maara	Logu	Tamil film
2022	Salute	Thampi	Released on SonyLIV
2023	Nanpakal Nerathu Mayakkam	Bus driver	
2023	Enkilum Chandrike	Ravindran	
2023	Enthada Saji	Maliyekkal Thomas	
2023	Antony	Manoj	
2023	Mothathi Kozhappa	Dasan	
2024	kanakarajyam	Thothiyannan	
2025	Ponman	Priest	
2025	L Jagadamma Ezham Class B		
