= Mothathi Kozhappa =

- Theatrical Release Poster
- Directed by: Sony P Jose
- Written by: Sony P Jose; Vipinlal AV
- Produced by: Manmiyas Productions
- Starring: Sony P Jose; Sneha Unnikrishnan; TS Raju; Sunil Sukhada; Rajesh Sharma; Pradeep Kottayam; Naseer Sankranthi
- Cinematography: Rajeev Madhavan; Anoop Muthikkavil
- Edited by: Kiran Vijayan
- Music by: Satheesh Vishwa (Songs); Ajay Thilak, Shivan Bhavana (BGM)
- Distributed by: Manmiyas Productions
- Release date: 15 December 2023
- Running time: 155 minutes
- Country: India
- Language: Malayalam

Mothathi Kozhappa is a 2023 Indian Malayalam-language comedy film directed by Sony P Jose in his directorial debut, written by Vipinlal AV and Sony P Jose himself, also enacting the lead role alongside Sneha Unnikrishnan, TS Raju, Sunil Sukhada, Rajesh Sharma, Pradeep Kottayam and Naseer Sankranthi.

The title launch of the film was done by Jagathy Sreekumar at Thiruvananthapuram and touted as the last work of lyricist Poovachal Khader.

The film's shooting was halted due to the first and second wave of COVID-19 pandemic several times, and was released on 15 December 2023.

== Synopsis ==
Mothathi Kozhappa tells the story of some odd characters staying at a village located in the southern most region of Kerala. A character from Panchkula, near Punjab arrives at that peaceful village and their lives takes an unexpected turn as the 'outsider' tries to involve in their personal matters that makes lives difficult for almost everyone at the village.

== Cast ==
- Sony P Jose ... Vinayan
- Sneha Unnikrishnan ... Anu
- TS Raju ... Uncle
- Sunil Sukhada ... Shashankan
- Rajesh Sharma ... Dasan
- Pradeep Kottayam ... Moneylender
- Kalyani Nair ... Wife of Veerapandyan
- Naseer Sankranthi ... Pastor
- Sushanth R ... Veerapandyan
- Molly Kannamaly ... Grandmother
- Ratheesh GL ... Mathayi
- Manju Vijeesh ... Aanandhi
- Sivadas Mattannur ... Brother-in-law
- Pradeep Prabhakar ... Veluppan
- Pradeep Muhamma ... Karuppan
- Sasankan Mayyanad ... Babu

== Production ==
The film was shot at several locations of Trivandrum, Nagercoil, Tirunelveli, Thoothukudi, Kozhikode, Ponmudi, Vagamon and Munnar. Debutant director Sony P Jose played the lead apart from writing screenplay with Vipinlal AV. Actor TS Raju, who played an important role in the film said in a promotional event that, he experienced his death for a while as his death hoax became viral in Kerala and he thought that he was actually dead. The trailer of the film was released on 17 November 2023.
