= Pullikkaran Staraa =

- Theatrical release poster
- Directed by: Syamdhar
- Written by: Ratheesh Ravi
- Produced by: B. Rakesh
- Starring: Mammootty; Deepti Sati; Asha Sarath; Innocent; Dileesh Pothan; Hareesh Perumanna; Sohan Seenulal
- Cinematography: Vinod Ilampally
- Edited by: Ratheesh Raj
- Music by: Songs: M. Jayachandran; Background score: Gopi Sunder
- Production company: Universal Cinemas
- Distributed by: Anto Joseph Film Company
- Release date: 1 September 2017
- Running time: 135 minutes
- Country: India
- Language: Malayalam
- Box office: ₹13.76 crores(Kerala alone)

Pullikkaran Staraa (transl. He is the Star) is a 2017 Indian Malayalam-language comedy film written and directed by Syamdhar and starring Mammootty, Deepti Sati and Asha Sarath . The film released on 1 September 2017, coinciding with Onam and Bakrid festivals.

== Plot ==
Rajakumaran (Mammootty), moves to Kochi as an instructor in a teacher's training institute and he meets two women, Manjari (Asha Sarath) and Manjima (Deepti Sati) which changes the turn of his life.

== Cast ==
- Mammootty as Rajakumaran
  - Naaif Noushad as Teen Rajakumaran
    - Kristin Varkachaan as Young Rajakumaran
- Deepti Sati as Manjima (voice-over by Raveena Ravi)
- Asha Sarath as Manjari Anthony, a School teacher
- Dileesh Pothan as Kuryachen, Rajakumaran and Manjari's friend and classmate
- Hareesh Perumanna as Bharathan, Security
- Innocent as Omanakshan Pillai
- Kalabhavan Haneef as teacher
- Asha Aravind as Kuryachan's wife
- Sijoy Varghese as Anthony
- Vivek Gopan as Vivek
- Pearle Maaney as Angelina
- Sohan Seenulal as Mayur, Rajakumaran's younger brother
- Nitha Promy as Deepa teacher
- Alencier Ley Lopez as Kumaran, Rajakumaran's father
- Divya M Nair as Rajakumaran's mother
- Maniyanpilla Raju as Murali Nambiar, Manjima's father
- Anjali Aneesh as Mayur's wife
- Thesni Khan as Vedikettu Mridhula
- Sunil Sukhada as Sudhakaran

== Production ==
Pullikkaran Staara is the second directorial venture by Syamdhar. The film is produced by B. Rakesh & Francis Kannookadan, under the banner Universal Cinemas in association with FTS FILMS. Mammootty does the role of a teacher trainer who hails from Idukki. Deepti Sati returned after a gap of over 2 years. Asha Sarath does the second female lead role, that of a teacher. After a short break, actor and parliamentarian Innocent (actor) is shown in a full-length role in the film. The makers announced the title of the film, only after the completion of the shoot.

== Release ==
The film opened in theatres as an Onam-Bakrid release on 1 September 2017.

== Box office ==
The film grossed ₹95 lakh in the opening day at Kerala box office. The film grossed ₹13.76 crores at the Kerala box office in its final run.

== Music ==
The film features songs composed by M. Jayachandran while the background score is provided by Gopi Sundar. An audio launch function was held on 10 August 2017.

Track listing
No.	Title	Lyrics	Singer(s)	Length
1.	"Tapp Tapp"	Santhosh Varma	Sreya Jayadeep
2.	"Oru Kavalam Painkilli"	B.K. Harinarayan	Vijay Yesudas
3.	"Mathalathen"	Vinayak Sasikumar	Vijay Yesudas
4.	"Kilivathilin Chare Nee"	M. R. Jayageetha	Anne Amie
