= Teacheramma (TV series) =

Indian Malayalam-language TV series

- Genre: Drama
- Written by: Aadhi Kiran
- Directed by: Nisanth
- Starring: Sreelakshmi
- Country of origin: India
- Original language: Malayalam
- No. of episodes: 324

Production
- Producer: Salil Sankaran
- Cinematography: Rajeev Mankomb
- Editor: Shyam Sakaleswar
- Camera setup: Multi-camera
- Running time: 22 minutes approx
- Production company: SENN Productions

Original release
- Network: Asianet; JioHotstar (India)
- Release: 7 April 2025 – 24 April 2026

Teacheramma is an Indian Malayalam-language soap opera drama television series written by Aadhi Kiran and directed by Nisanth. It stars Sreelakshmi in lead role. The show was premiered on 7 April 2025 on Asianet and OTT platform JioHotstar. The show ended on 24 April 2026.

== Synopsis ==
Saraswathi, a dedicated primary school teacher in her early 50s, is respected in her professional life but faces neglect and emotional pain at home.

She has two daughters and a son, but only her youngest daughter, Veena, remains unmarried and close to her. Radha (the eldest daughter) and Mahesh (the son) treat Saraswathi as a caretaker, cook, and facilitator—using her for their benefit while giving her nothing in return.

== Cast ==
=== Main cast ===
- Sreelakshmi as Saraswathi/Lakshmi (dual role)
- Poornima Anand as Mary kutty
- Aleena Sajan as Veena
- Romel as John

=== Recurring ===
- Sarath Das as AEO Vivek
- Manoj Kumar as Mohan
- Jayakumar Parameswaran Pillai as Sivaraman
- Murali Menon as Krishna Chandran
- Binza Binosh as Kalyani
- Surjith Purohith as Mahesh
- Sayana Krishnan as Renuka
- Ann Mathew as Radha
- Soumya as Kani
- Roshna Thiyath as Neena
- Yassar as Vishnu
- Sachin SG as Midhun
- Ashbin as Santhosh
- Ashaa Nair as Maniyamma
- Jithin Kurumassery as Anand
- Sreeramya Manu as Rani
- Sumi Rashik as Preetha Member
- Nihanth P as Vinod
- Venu Madhavan Nair as Soman
- Guines Vinod as Madanan
- Sumi Ajith as Kamalakshi
- Lal Muttathara as Suni
- Niyon Sijesh as Rithik
- Sreeraj Varkala as Reji
- Thara Prasad as Jiji
- Praveena as Tara

== Reception ==
The TRP performance of Teacheramma according to Broadcast Audience Research Council (BARC) is as follows:

| Month / Period | Rank | Ref |
|---|---|---|
| April 2025 | 5 | |
| May 2025 | 3 | |
| July 2025 | 3 | |
| September 2025 | 5 | |
| October 2025 | 4 | |
| November 2025 | 6 | |
| January 2026 | 6 | |
| February 2026 | 6 | |

== Awards ==
| Year | Award | Category | Recipient(s) | Result | Ref. |
|---|---|---|---|---|---|
| 2025 | 3rd Kerala Vision Television Awards | Best Actress | Sreelakshmi | Won | |
| 2025 | 3rd Kerala Vision Television Awards | Best Supporting Actress | Sayana Krishna | Won | |
| 2026 | Asianet Television Awards | Best Actress | Sreelakshmi | Won | |
| 2026 | Asianet Television Awards | Best Screenplay (Special Jury) | Aadhi Kiran | Won | |

== Adaptations ==
| Language | Title | Original release | Network(s) | Last aired | Notes | Ref. |
|---|---|---|---|---|---|---|
| Marathi | Aamchya Ladkya Naik Baai | 10 August 2026 | Star Pravah | Ongoing | Remake | |
