= Bonsai (2018 film) =

- Theatrical release poster
- Directed by: Santhosh Peringeth
- Written by: Santhosh Peringeth
- Produced by: Suresh KP
- Starring: Manoj K. Jayan; Lena; Santhosh Keezhattoor; Sunil Sukhada; Rajesh Sharma; Ajin Shaji
- Cinematography: Jaleel Badusha
- Edited by: Sobin K Soman
- Music by: Sachin Balu
- Production company: Essar Films
- Release date: 23 February 2018 (Kerala)
- Running time: 102 minutes
- Country: India
- Language: Malayalam

Bonsai is a 2018 Indian Malayalam film written and directed by debutant Santhosh Peringeth. After his critically acclaimed short film Kotti and some other short films Santhosh came up with the film Bonsai. The film stars Manoj K Jayan, Lena, Santhosh Keezhattoor, Ajin Shaji and Anagha Janaki in the lead roles. Bonsai deals with social themes including education, social class and social mobility. The central character of the film is a school going Dalit boy who desires to own a bicycle to go to the far away school. The film was released on 23 February 2018 in Malayalam and produced by Suresh KP under the banner Essar Films.

== Plot ==
In an apartment in a densely populated city, where the buildings outnumber the trees, a small family arrives, nurturing a pot bearing a tiny tree with stunted growth and regularly chiselled branches. Their daughter always dreams of shifting the bonsai tree from its congested abode and planting it in its original soil. In a forest where trees are huge and men are small, a tribal boy named Krishnan realizes that having a bicycle would strengthen the prospect of joining the high school to pursue his studies after 7th standard. How the society handles his efforts for owning the bicycle, how the use of plastics affect the traditional life style of the people, their attempts, quests and dreams about their anticipation spreads its wings in spite of all the hurdles just like the bonsai tree.

== Cast ==
- Manoj K. Jayan
- Lena
- Santhosh Keezhattoor
- Rajesh Sharma
- Sunil Sukhada
- Ajin Shaji
- Anagha Janaki
- Bobythomas Chunda
- Suresh Ramanthali
- CK Sudheer
- KC Krishnan
- Rajeev Robert
- Master Ajin
- Sudhev
- Haritha Hareesh

== Production ==
After getting the state award for best short film for Kotti Santhosh Peringeth announced his new project named Bonsai. The principal photography took place between August and November 2017 in Payyannur, Kannur, and Thrissur.

The music is composed by Sachin Balu, while Jaleel Badusha handles the cinematography. The song Kaadum Kaattaarum sung by P. Jayachandran and Haritha Hareesh was released separately on 8 January 2018 through Satyam Audios YouTube channel. Second song Chellam Cholli sung by Sreya Jayadeep was released on 3 January. Third song Anthikkoru Choppum sung by Sunil Mathai and Sreekutty was released on 6 February. The songs were composed by Jayachandran Kavumthazha, with lyrics penned by Suresh Ramanthali. A two minutes official trailer of film was released on 20 February through the YouTube channel of Satyam Videos. Bonsai released in Kerala on 23 February 2018 and met with mixed response.

== Music ==
The film features three songs composed by Jayachandran Kavumthazha. The lyrics were written by Suresh Ramanthali.

Track list

No.	Title	Lyrics	Singer(s)	Length
1.	"Kaadum kaattarum "	Suresh Ramanthali	P. Jayachandran, Haritha Hareesh	4:38
2.	"Chellam Cholli "	Suresh Ramanthali	Sreya Jayadeep	4:31
3.	"Anthikkoru Choppum "	Suresh Ramanthali	Sunil Mathai, Sreekutty	3:56
