= 7th Day (film) =

2014 Indian film by Syamdhar

- Theatrical release poster
- Directed by: Syamdhar
- Written by: Akhil Paul
- Produced by: Shibu G. Suseelan
- Starring: Prithviraj Sukumaran; Tovino Thomas; Vinay Forrt; Janani Iyer; Yog Jappe; Anu Mohan; Praveen Prem
- Cinematography: Sujith Vaassudev
- Edited by: Johnkutty
- Music by: Deepak Dev
- Production company: Movie Junction
- Distributed by: August Cinema
- Release date: 11 April 2014 (India)
- Running time: 134 minutes
- Country: India
- Language: Malayalam

7th Day is a 2014 Indian Malayalam-language neo-noir crime thriller film directed by Syamdhar (in his directorial debut) and written by Akhil Paul. It stars Prithviraj Sukumaran as David Abraham, a 42-year-old IPS officer who is on a trail of an unnatural case. The film also features Tovino Thomas, Anu Mohan, Vinay Forrt, Yog Japee, Janani Iyer and Praveen Prem in substantial roles. 7th Day was a commercial success of the year at the box office.7th Day is remade in hindi as Blind Game released on 11 November 2026 through Zee 5 featuring Arjun Rampal and Priyamani.

== Plot ==
On the night of Christmas, police officer David Abraham's Jeep hits Shan and Vinu's motorcycle after leaving a party. David takes them to the hospital to treat Vinu's injuries. Vinu escapes from the hospital, much to Shan's horror. David begins to suspect that something is wrong, however Shan reassures him and David drops him to his place. He then notices that Vinu has dropped his wallet in his jeep.

Shan recounts the story of his friends - Ebineser aka Aby, Jessica aka Jessy, Cycle and Vinu. Vinu owns an internet cafe and Dtp centre through his late father Ramachandran's pension and provident fund, Cycle is the son of a gulf-emigrant Jacob Cyril with financial problems, and Shan is a local correspondent for a newspaper. Aby and Jessica grew up together in an orphanage, and they both share a close bond with each other. One day, Vinu's internet cafe is raided by the police, who are unable to find anything, and do not reveal anything to Vinu. That night, Vinu's house is raided by a goon named Charlie, who is assigned by Christopher Moriarty, a dreaded gangster with a near mythical reputation, to find a missing sum of Rs. 1 crore. He suspects that Vinu has stolen the money and gives him 1 and a half day to surrender the cash.

Later, David receives a call from a local travel agent that someone has given him a fake a thousand rupees note to book a bus ticket to Bangalore. David catches him from the bus and the agent is revealed to be Cycle who was attempting to leave town. Using Cycle, David locates his other friends - Vinu and Jessica, while Aby is nowhere to be seen. David asks Vinu to recount the events of the night of his suicide. He initially lies to them, but under pressure discloses to David that Aby was the mastermind and stole the cash so that he could kill Vinu because of his secret love for Jessica, but Jessica and Cycle knew of this. Jessica could not forgive him for trying to kill Vinu, and out of guilt, Aby reveals to them that the money is in the vehicle and commits suicide by jumping from a waterfall. Coincidentally, Aby's blood type was the same as Vinu's and they both had the same tattoo, so they used Aby's suicide to fake Vinu's death.

After their confession, David reveals that Aby was a carrier for Christopher and that the money in the bag was counterfeit cash. David gives them the option of either leaving the money on the table so that he can report it as an abandoned bag of counterfeit money, or to arrest and charge them for planned murder. They hand over the money to David and leave. After they leave, however, Shan stops the car and questions the true identity of David Abraham, and the simple option given to them. They come to the realization that David Abraham doesn't exist and is in fact Christopher Moriarty.

== Cast ==
- Prithviraj Sukumaran as David Abraham IPS(imposter )/ Christopher Moriarty(real),Main Antagonist
- Tovino Thomas as Ebineser (Aby)
- Vinay Forrt as Shan Shahar
- Janani Iyer as Jessica (Jessy)
- Anu Mohan as Vinu Ramachandran
- Praveen Prem as Cyril Samuel aka Cycle
- Joy Mathew as P.T.R. Bhattathiri
- Baiju V K as C.I Victor
- Yog Japee as Charlie,Secondary Antagonist
- Lakshmi Priya as Lab Technician
- Shobha Mohan as Vinu's mother
- Sreedevi Unni as Sr. Veronica
- Gayathri
- Sunil Sukhada as Security Simon

== Soundtrack ==
The songs of the film were composed by Prithviraj's norm collaborator Deepak Dev and the film includes 3 songs.

== Release ==
The film was released on 12 April 2014.

== Box office ==
7th Day was a commercial success. In Kerala
