= Sujith Vaassudev =

Indian cinematographer (born 1974)

- Born: Thiruvananthapuram, Kerala, India
- Occupations: Photographer; Cinematographer; Film director
- Years active: 2009–present
- Spouse: Manju Pillai (m. 2000; div. 2024)
- Awards: Kerala State Film Award for Best Cinematographer (2013)

Sujith Vaassudev ISC is an Indian cinematographer and film director who works predominantly in Malayalam films. He has also worked in several Tamil and Telugu films. He is best known for his works in Memories (2013), 7th Day (2014), Drishyam (2013), Lucifer (2019), L2: Empuraan (2025). He was the recipient of the Kerala State Film Award for Best Cinematographer in 2013.

== Career ==
Started his career as a camera assistant in a studio called Sangeetha Vision in Thiruvananthapuram. From there he gradually built his knowledge in cinematography by assisting many cameramen. He started his first independent works for television in 1998. He has done more than 1000 episodes for television for various Malayalam channels. He assisted Raja Rathinam for a while in cinematography. Sujith made his debut with Chekavar a 2010 Malayalam film. His best works include Drishyam, 7th Day, Memories, Ayaal, Anarkali.

Sujith Vaassudev won the 2013 Kerala State Film Award for Best Cinematography for the films Ayaal and Memories.

In 2016 he debuted as a director through the film James & Alice starring Prithviraj Sukumaran and Vedhika.

== Personal life ==
Sujith married actress Manju Pillai on 23 December 2000. The couple has a daughter. Sujith and Manju Pillai have been separated since 2020 and divorced in 2024.

== Filmography ==
- All films are in Malayalam, unless mentioned otherwise.

Key
†	Denotes films that have not yet been released

=== As cinematographer ===
Year	Film	Notes
2009	Kerala Cafe	Segment : Lalitham Hiranmayam
2010	Chekavar	
2010	College Days	
2011	City of God	
2012	Mullamottum Munthiricharum	
2012	Molly Aunty Rocks!	
2013	Ayaal	Kerala State Film Award for Best Cinematographer; Nominated – SIIMA Award for Best Cinematographer
2013	Memories	Kerala State Film Award for Best Cinematographer
2013	Punyalan Agarbattis	
2013	Drishyam	
2014	7th Day	
2015	Papanasam	Tamil film
2015	Amar Akbar Anthony	
2015	Anarkali	
2017	Ezra	
2017	1971: Beyond Borders	
2019	Lucifer	
2020	Anveshanam	
2020	Miss India	
2022	Khiladi	Telugu film
2022	The Warriorr	Bilingual film
2023	Bro	Telugu film
2024	Manorathangal	Anthology series
2025	L2: Empuraan	
2026	Magic Mushrooms †	

=== As director ===
Year	Film	Language	Notes
2016	James & Alice	Malayalam	Also cinematographer
2018	Autorsha	Malayalam	Also cinematographer

=== As actor ===
Year	Film	Role	Language
2015	Amar Akbar Anthony	Himself	Malayalam
2020	Anveshanam	Channel Head	Malayalam

== Awards ==
Year	Award	Category	Film(s)	Result
2012	Kerala State Television Award	Best Cinematographer	Nizhalum Nilaavum Parayunnathu	Won
2013	Kerala State Film Award	Best Cinematographer	Ayaal, Memories	Won
2013	South Indian International Movie Award	Best Cinematographer	Ayaal, Memories	Nominated
2014	Minnalai Film TV Awards	Best Cinematographer	Drishyam, Memories	Won
2016	Kerala Film Critics Association Award	Best Cinematographer	James & Alice	Won
