= Sijoy Varghese =

Indian actor and advertising filmmaker (born 1975)

- Born: Sijoy Varghese; 6 March 1971 (age 55); Edappally, Kerala, India
- Education: Sacred Heart College, Thevara
- Occupations: Actor; ad film director
- Years active: 1994 – present
- Spouse: Tessy Raphel (m. 1999)
- Children: 5
- Parents: C. Varghese Kelamparambil; Leelamma Varghese
- Website: sijoy.com

Sijoy Varghese (born 6 March 1971) is an Indian actor and advertising filmmaker. He has been involved in advertising and cinema for 20 years. As an actor he has portrayed characters in Malayalam films including Bangalore Days, Avatharam, James & Alice, Aadhi and Ittymaani: Made in China.

== Early and personal life ==
Sijoy was born in Edappally, Kochi to (late) C. Varghese Kelamparambil, a headmaster; and (late) Leelamma Varghese, a teacher.

He studied at the Sacred Heart College, Thevara before commencing his career in the film and advertising film industry.

He married Tessy Raphel in 1999. The couple has five children — Adithya, Amy, Annie, Anthony and Zarah.

== Career ==
Sijoy started his career as an assistant director, and has worked with the leading ad film production houses of India. In 2005 he found his own production house, TVC Factory, which has now grown to be one of the most trusted production houses in India and UAE.

Sijoy is also an actor who has performed supporting characters in Malayalam films including Bangalore Days, Avatharam, James & Alice, Aadhi and Ittymaani: Made in China.

He is the current President of Indian Adfilm Makers (IAM), S.Indian Chapter.

Sijoy started his acting career in 2013 with the role of a police commissioner in Martin Prakkat's ABCD, along with Dulquer Salmaan. He indulged in further experimentation with Amal Neerad Production's 5 Sundarikal (2013). He co-wrote Isha with Sidharth Bharathan for Sameer Thahir in the much appreciated anthology. After his villainous Cabinet Minister for Thira by Vineeth Sreenivasan, he did a notable role in Anjali Menon's movie Bangalore Days as Coach Zach, for which his character got a huge fan response. Later, he played the same role of the coach with Arya in the Tamil remake named Bangalore Naatkal. Then he appeared on screen as ACP Gautam Viswanath along with Dileep in director Joshiy's Avatharam, for which his character was appreciated by critics and public in general. In 2016 he portrayed St. Peter in Sujith Vasudev's debut movie James & Alice, for which he garnered critical acclaim for his style of acting. He appeared in Jamna Pyari as Vasu, Pranav Mohanlal starrer Aadhi as Sidharth, and Mohanlal starrer Ittymaani: Made in China as Alex Plamoottil.

== Filmography ==
Key
†	Denotes films that have not yet been released

=== Malayalam films ===
Year	Title	Role	Notes
2013	ABCD	Commissioner	
2013	Thira	Home Minister Alex	
2014	Bangalore Days	Coach Zach	
2014	Avatharam	ACP Gautam Viswanath	
2014	RajadhiRaja	Gangster Chandru	
2015	Ayal Njanalla	Manaf	
2015	Jamna Pyari	Vasu	
2016	James & Alice	St. Peter	19th Asianet Film Awards - Special Jury award Asiavision Awards - Best Supporting Actor
2016	Gemini	Dr. Vijay Varma	
2017	Tharangam	Christopher Luke	
2017	Pullikkaran Staraa	Antony	
2017	Aadu 2	Keshav Madhav IPS	
2018	Diwanjimoola Grand Prix	Bike Rider Christo	
2018	Aadhi	Sidharth	
2018	Parole	Varkey	
2018	Abrahaminte Santhathikal	Joseph Esthappan	
2019	Mikhael	Abram	
2019	Neeyum Njanum	Kishan	
2019	The Gambinos	DySP Pradeep Kumar	
2019	Lucifer	PR Manager	
2019	Ormayil Oru Sisiram	Shihab	
2019	The Gambler	Kochu Lona	
2019	Ittymaani: Made in China	Alex Plamoottil	
2020	Thelivu	Issac	
2020	Guardian	Nandakumar IPS	
2021	Kolaambi	Sanjay Tharakan	
2021	Lal Bagh	Tom	
2022	Bro Daddy	Agency Head	
2022	The Hope	Dr. John	
2023	Binary	Sreeram	
2023	Namukku Kodathiyil Kanaam	David	
2024	Swargam	Fr. Sony	
2026	Unmadham		

=== Other language films ===
Year	Title	Role	Language	Notes
2015	Bangalore Naatkal	Coach Zach	Tamil	
2016	Munnodi	ACP Soundarpandian	Tamil	
2017	A Gentleman	Ramachandra Rao IPS	Hindi	
2018	Amar Akbar Anthony	Sanjay	Telugu	
2023	Thunivu	Sam Jacob	Tamil	
2024	Ayalaan	Arjun	Tamil	
2024	KA	Abid Shaikh	Telugu	Uncredited
