= Sreelakshmi =

Indian actress (born 1975)

Sreelekshmi
- Born: Thiruvananthapuram, Kerala, India
- Occupation: Actress
- Years active: 1993; 1997–2001; 2011–present

Sreelekshmi is an Indian actress who appears in Malayalam-language films and television serials. She has won three Kerala state Awards, two Best Actress and one Second Best Actress.

== Personal life ==
She was born to Bhaskaran Nair and Rajeswariyamma, as the youngest child among three children at Vazhuthacaud, Thiruvananthapuram, Kerala. She has two elder brothers, Krishnakumar and Vjay Bhaskar. She had her primary education at Carmel Girls Higher Secondary School, Thiruvananthapuram. She was the Kalathilakam in 1991 at Kerala university. After her pre-university course she pursued a diploma in Bharata Natyam dance from Kalakshetra, Chennai.

She is married to Ratheesh, General Manager in an interior fit out company based in Dubai. They have two sons, Ananth Maheshwar and Akshith Maheshwar. After marriage she retired from movies and settled at Dubai with family. While in Dubai the actress was busy running a dance school. She made a comeback in 2012 with television serials. Currently she resides at Thiruvananthapuram and runs a dance school Temple of Arts at muttada road marappalam, Pattom Thiruvananthapuram.

== Awards ==
- 1991 – Kerala University Kalathilakam
- 1997 – Kerala State Film Award for Second Best Actress – Bhoothakkannadi
- 1997 – Kerala State Television Award for Best Actress – Maranam Durbalam (Doordharsan)
- 2011 – Kerala State Television Award for Best Actress – Ardhachandrante Rathri (Amritha TV)
- 2024 – Zee Keralam Kudumbam Awards : Best Mother & Golden Icon of Zee – Kudumbashree Sarada
- 2025 - Kerala Vision Television Awards for Best Actress - Teacheramma

== Filmography ==
Key
†	Denotes films that have not yet been released

=== Films ===
Year	Title	Role	Director	Notes
1993	Porutham	Athira	Kaladharan	
1997	Bhoothakkannadi	Sarojini	A. K. Lohithadas	
1997	Guru	Seethalakshmi	Rajiv Anchal	
1997	The Car	Maya	Rajasenan	
1998	Thalolam	Devu	Jayaraj	
1998	Mattupetti Machan	Lashmi Kubera	Jose Thomas	
2015	Oru Vadakkan Selfie	Umesh's mother	G. Prajith	
2017	Sakhavu	Krishnakumar's mother	Sidhartha Siva	
2018	Thobama	Smitha	Mohsin Kassim	
2018	Oru Kuprasidha Payyan	Sheela	Madhupal	
2019	Oru Kaatil Oru Paykappal	Girija	Vijayakumar Prabhakaran	
2019	Sathyam Paranja Viswasikkuvo?	Deepa	G. Prajith	
2019	Manoharam	Thangam	Anwar Sadiq	
2019	Adhyarathri	Shantha	Jibu Jacob	
2019	Under World	Stalin's mother	Arun Kumar Aravind	
2020	Uriyadi	Kavitha	Dinesh Damodar	
2020	Maniyarayile Ashokan	Lakshmi	Shamzu Zayba	
2021	Vellam	Radhamma	Prajesh Sen	
2021	Mohan Kumar Fans	Deepika Varma	Jis Joy	
2022	Randu	Savithri	Sujith Lal	
2022	Karnan Napolean Bhagath Singh	Indira	Sarath G. Mohan	
2022	John Luther	Molly	Abhijith Joseph	
2022	Innale Vare	Aadhi's mother	Jis Joy	
2022	Vaashi	Madhavi's mother	Vishnu G. Raghav	
2022	Kochaal	Sreekuttan's mother	Shyam Mohan	
2022	19(1)(a)	Sarojini	Indhu V.S	
2022	Theerppu	Beevathu	Rathish Ambat	
2022	Kotthu	Ammini	Sibi Malayil	
2022	Thattassery Koottam	Indhira	Anoop	
2023	Higuita	–	Hemanth G. Nair	
2023	Bullet Diaries			
2023	Untitled Jayasurya's Production †	TBA		
2023	Jamalinte Punchiri †	TBA		

== Television Serials ==
Year	Title	Channel	Director	Notes
1997	Maranam Durbalam	DD Malayalam	Shyama Prasad	Television Debut
1999	Draupathi	DD Malayalam		
2000	Appooppanthadi	DD Malayalam		
2001	Shamanathalam	Asianet	Shyamaprasad	
2011	Ardhachandrante Rathri	Amrita TV	Sudheesh Sankar	Comeback
2011	Suryakanthi	Jaihind TV	Manu.V.Nair	
2012	Sreepadmanabham	Amrita TV	Suresh Unnithan	
2012	Agniputhri	Asianet	Gireesh Konni	
2013	Oru Penninte Kadha	Mazhavil Manorama	K. K. Rajeev	
2013	Avalude Kadha	Surya TV	K. K. Rajeev	
2014–2015	Ammamanasam	Surya TV	K. K. Rajeev	
2015	Eeswaran Sakshiyayi	Flowers TV	K. K. Rajeev	
2016	Jagratha	Amrita TV	Kannan	
2017	Mamattikutty	Flowers TV	A. M. Nazeer	
2018	Athmasakhi	Mazhavil Manorama	Mohan Kupleri	
2018–2019	Kshana Prabha Chanchalam	Amrita TV	Sivamohanthampi	
2019–2020	Bhadra	Surya TV	Baiju Devaraj	
2021	Madhavi	Flowers TV	Ranjith	Short film
2021–2022	Daya	Asianet	Gireesh Konni	
2022–2026	Kudumbashree Sharada	Zee Keralam	Dr. S. Janardhanan	
2023	Mizhirandilum	Zee Keralam	A.M.Naseer	Special appearance in mahasangamam episodes & Guest appearance
2023	Shyamambaram	Zee Keralam	Mohan Kupleri	Guest appearance
2024	Subhadram	Zee Keralam	Dr. S. Janardhanan	Special appearance in mahasangamam episodes
2025–2026	Teacheramma	Asianet	Nisanth	
2025	Veetile Vilakku	Flowers TV		Cameo appearance
2025	Mahalaxmi	Flowers TV		Cameo appearance
2025	Maveli Kottaram	Asianet		Telefilm

Other TV Shows

- Surya Challenge
- Beat the Floors
- Parayam Nedam
- Red Carpet
- Zee Keralam Mahotsavam
- Onnum Onnum Moonu
- Varthaprabhatham
- Tharapakittu
- Dream Drive
- Comedy Super Nite
- Ladies Hour

=== Miscellaneous ===
She has participated in popular game show SURYA CHALLENGE on Surya TV along with Avalude Kadha team. She has acted in some advertisements also. She judged the reality show Beat the floors in DD Malayalam.She has performed in amateur dramas like Nareeyam.
