= Oru Kodai Murder Mystery =

- Genre: Crime thriller
- Created by: Anitha Nair
- Written by: Padmakumar Narasimhamurthy
- Screenplay by: Padmakumar Narasimhamurthy
- Directed by: Vishal Venkat
- Starring: Abhirami; Akash; Aishwarya; Raghav; John; Namrita; Nikhil Nair; Abitha; Frankin; Sylvan
- Country of origin: India
- Original language: Tamil
- No. of seasons: 1
- No. of episodes: 8

Production
- Producers: Fazila Allana; Kamna Menezes
- Cinematography: Raj Kumar P M
- Editor: Mathivathanan J A
- Production company: Sol Productions

Original release
- Network: ZEE5
- Release: 21 April 2023

Oru Kodai Murder Mystery (transl. A summer murder mystery) is a thrilling whodunit directed by Vishal Venkat, known for his work on Sila Nerangalil Sila Manidhargal. Produced by Fazila Allana-Kamna Menezes under Sol Production, the series stars an ensemble cast including Abhirami, Akash, Aishwarya, Nikhil Nair, Raghav, John, Namrita, Abitha, Frankin, and Sylvan in pivotal roles. The series premiered on ZEE5 on 21 April 2023.

== Plot ==
The story of Oru Kodai Murder Mystery is set in a picturesque hill town and centers around Vyom, a shy school student who has a crush on Tara, his quiz show partner. On the day of their planned meeting, Tara goes missing, and her body is later discovered in a lake. Devastated by her death, Vyom embarks on a quest to uncover the truth behind Tara's mysterious demise with the help of his friends.

== Cast ==
- Abhirami as Ananthalakshmi (Annie) Varadarajan
- Aakash Srinivas as Vyom Varadarajan
- John Jude Kennedy as Shital Bannerjee
- Nakshatra as Anandhi
- Namrita MV as Tara Venkat
- Abitha Venkatraman as Sanjana
- Nikhil Nair as Manav Varadarajan
- Aishwariyaa Bhaskaran as MLA Meenakshi Mohan
- Lizzie Antony as DSP Jayanthi Selvaraj
- Raaghav as Allwyn
- Pawan as Inspector Madhavan
- "Aaru" Bala as Ganesh Pandian
- Jeson Joy as Karthik Soman

== Production ==
=== Casting ===
The technical team of the series includes PR Rajkumar as the cinematographer, while music is composed by Sudharshan M Kumar. Mathivathanan has worked as the editor. The screenplay for Oru Kodai Murder Mystery is written by N Padmakumar, with Rohit Nandakumar and N Padmakumar as dialogue writers.

=== Release ===
In the beginning of 2022, ZEE5 revealed a lineup of Tamil movies and series, among them being Oru Kodai Murder Mystery which made its debut on 21 April 2023. The makers released the first look trailer of the series on social media platforms on 13 April 2023. The series, which consists of eight episodes, started streaming on ZEE5 on 21 April 2023.

== Reception ==
Chandhini R of Cinema Express rated the series 3/5 and wrote "Oru Kodai Murder Mystery emerges as a partly engaging and partly wishy-washy series offering a cornucopia of suspense and sentiment, albeit mostly relatable to Gen Z."

Thinkal Menon at HT Media (OTT Play) also gave the series 3 stars out of 5 and wrote "Oru Kodai Murder Mystery is a mixed bag of surprises and disappointments. What works is the protagonist's challenges which instantly connect with viewers, but the amateurishness in certain sequences and dialogues are a let down."

A reviewer for Binged gave it 5.5 out of 10 and stated "Tiring Thriller Saved By The Cast And Ending"

== Episodes ==
=== Season 1 ===
No.	Title	Directed by	Original release date
1	"The game is Afoot"	Vishal Venkat	21 April 2023
Fourteen-year-old Vyom's life is filled with darkness except for one ray of hope - his quiz partner and potential love interest, Thara Venkat. However, fate has its own plans. Thara Venkat has vanished into thin air, leaving Vyom in a state of bewilderment.
2	"Elementary!"	Vishal Venkat	21 April 2023
When Vyom is mocked and branded as a "Killer" at school, his inner Sherlock is sparked. He determines that he must vindicate himself with the assistance of his four companions. And it appears that the puzzle has been solved!
3	"It is My Business to Know What Other People Do Not Know"	Vishal Venkat	21 April 2023
Vyom's initial mistake only fueled his determination to uncover the culprit. Through diligent investigation, he identified three additional suspects, gained a new acquaintance, and found a sworn adversary.
4	"The Observation of Trifles"	Vishal Venkat	21 April 2023
Vyom and his friends appear to have made progress toward solving the case. They have managed to apprehend their prime suspect for the murder. However, it seems that there is more to the situation than meets the eye. Is it possible that the young detectives are pursuing the wrong lead?
5	"No ghosts need apply"	Vishal Venkat	21 April 2023
Vyom and his friends find themselves chasing shadows when their leads dry up. They begin to question whether the culprit is even human.
6	"There is nothing more deceptive than an obvious fact"	Vishal Venkat	21 April 2023
The inquiry takes a disastrous twist as the consequences escalate for Vyom when his mother becomes the target of the media. He is resolute to restore her reputation, but what if the culprit is someone within their inner circle?
7	"Crime is common. Logic is rare"	Vishal Venkat	21 April 2023
After Shital's "accident", Vyom and his friends were motivated to accelerate their investigation. However, all the individuals they suspected no longer matched the description of a ruthless killer. The clock was ticking. Can they locate the culprit before more lives are lost?
8	"Education never ends. It’s a series of lessons, with the greatest for the last"	Vishal Venkat	21 April 2023
Not every ending is a happy one. The case may seem resolved, but is it truly? Can Vyom rescue the life of the individual he has just come to realize he cherishes more than his own?
