= Naseer Sankranthi =

Indian Film Actor

Nazeer Sankranthi
- Born: 1968 (age 57–58); Sankranthi, Kottayam, Kerala, India
- Occupation: Film Actor
- Years active: 2011–present
- Spouse: Jaseena
- Children: Nashmin; Nishana; Nashin
- Awards: Kerala State Television Award

Nazeer Sankranthi is an Indian actor of Malayalam Cinema as well as Malayalam television shows. He rose to prominence with his humorous act of Thatteem Mutteem, a popular soap opera on Mazhavil Manorama. Naseer is also a two-time winner of Kerala State Television award for the best comedian and has played notable roles in several films like The Priest, Swarna Kaduva and Kappela.

== Filmography ==
Key
†	Denotes films that have not yet been released

- All films are in Malayalam language unless otherwise noted.

Year	Title	Role	Notes
2001	Sundara Purushan	Compounder	
2007	Changathipoocha	Firecracker Worker	
2012	Masters	Servant	
2014	Villali Veeran		
2014	Mannar Mathai Speaking 2	Officer at Drama Booking Center	
2015	Chandrettan Evideya	Auto Driver	
2015	Amar Akbar Anthony	Sabu's Friend	
2015	Utopiayile Rajavu	Danger Dasappan	
2015	Acha Dhin	Auto Driver	
2016	Swarna Kaduva	Broker	
2016	Welcome to Central Jail	Bhaskaran	
2016	Pa Va	Junior Priest	
2016	James & Alice	K.T Annan's Personal Assistant	
2016	Chinna Dada	Pappettan	
2016	Leela	Man at the temple	
2016	Shyam		
2016	Romanov	Devassy's aide	
2017	Aana Alaralodalaral	Kunji Pokker	
2017	Basheerinte Premalekhanam		
2017	Fukri	Panchayath Member	
2017	Kaattu		
2018	Autorsha	Mad Man	
2018	Carbon	A villager	
2018	Naam	Bennychan	
2018	Chalakkudikkaran Changathi	Makeup Man	
2018	Iblis	Kelu	
2018	Paviyettante Madhura Chooral	Pathrose	
2019	Aakasha Ganga 2	Minister Mathai	
2019	Adhyarathri		
2019	Mr. & Ms. Rowdy	Sadanandhan	
2019	Brother's Day	Police Constable	
2019	Vaarikkuzhiyile Kolapathakam	Antappan	
2019	Shibu	Kambikaadu	
2019	Isakkinte Ithihasam		
2019	Vaarthakal Ithuvare	Kochappi	
2019	Thanka Bhasma Kuriyitta Thamburatti	Komalan	
2019	Patham Classile Pranayam	School Peon	
2020	Kappela	Martin	
2021	The Priest	Orphanage Cook	
2021	Bheemante Vazhi	Gulan Paul	
2021	Velukkakka Oppu Ka		OTT Release
2021	Djibouti		
2021	Baby Sam	Mathai security	
2022	Pathonpatham Noottandu	Konthikuruppu	
2022	Thirimali	Mathai	
2022	Haasyam		
2023	Charles Enterprises		
2023	Mothathi Kozhappa	Pastor	
2024	Vayyasu Ethrayi Mooppathi		
2024	Manorathangal	Karyasthan	Segment: Abhayam Thedi Veendum
2025	Nellikkampoyil Night Riders †	TBA	

== Television ==
Year	Title	Channel	Role	Ref.
2010-2012	Tharolsavam	Kairali TV	Team captain	
2012–2023	Thatteem Mutteem	Mazhavil Manorama	Kamalasanan; Mandahassan	
2015	Uggram Ujjwalam	Mazhavil Manorama	Kamalasanan of Thatteem Mutteem	
2016	Nadodikkaattu	Flowers TV	Various Roles	
2016	Komady Circus	Mazhavil Manorama	Various Roles	
2016-2019	Laughing Villa	Surya TV	Care Taker of the 'Laughing Villa'	
2016-2017	Chinthavishtayaya Seetha	Asianet TV	Shobhanan	
2017	Comedy Super Nite-2	Flowers TV	Chief Guest	
2018-2019	Thakarppan Comedy	Mazhavil Manorama	Various Roles	
2019	Comedy Nights with Suraj	Zee Keralam	Various Roles	
2020	Comedy Masters	Amrita TV	Various Roles	
2020	Funny Nights with Pearle Maaney	Zee Keralam	Various Roles	
2020	Appanum Koppanum	YouTube Web series	Koppan	
2020-2021	Ente Maathavu	Surya TV	Kapyar Pyli	
2021	Udan Panam 3.O	Mazhavil Manorama	Kamalasanan of Thatteem Mutteem	
2021-2024	Oru Chiri Iru Chiri Bumper Chiri	Mazhavil Manorama	Judge of the show	
2021-2022	Bumper Chiri Aaghosham	Mazhavil Manorama	Judge of the show	
2021	Comedy Thillana	Kairali TV	Various Roles	
2021	Oh Come On Baby Oh Yeah	Web Series on YouTube Channel Behindwoods	Various Roles	

== Awards ==
Award	Year	Category	Program	Ref.
Kerala State Television Award	2015	Best Comedian	Thatteem Mutteem	
Kerala State Television Award	2020	Best Comedian	Thatteem Mutteem; Comedy Masters	
