= Abhirami (actress, born 1983) =

Indian actress and voice actress (born 1983)

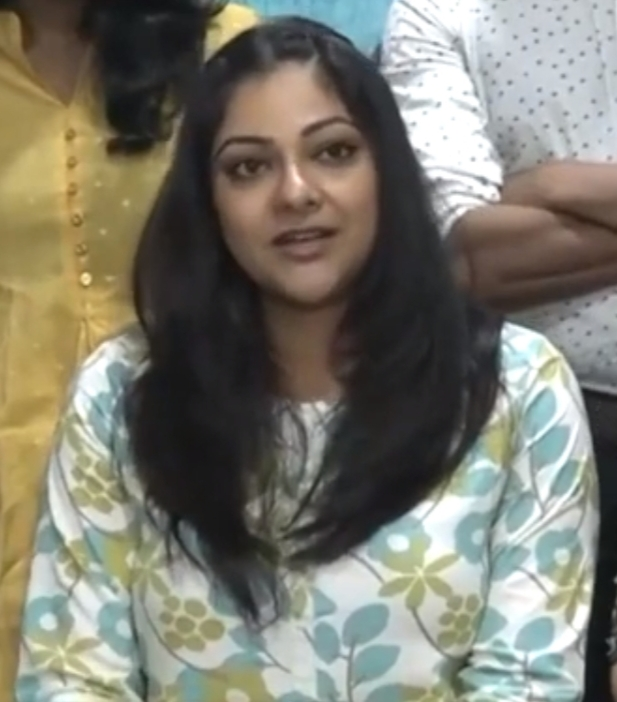
- Abhirami in 2023
- Born: Divya Gopikumar; 26 July 1983 (age 43); Thiruvananthapuram, Kerala, India
- Education: Mar Ivanios College, Thiruvananthapuram; College of Wooster, Ohio
- Occupations: Actress; Voice actress; Television host
- Years active: 1995–2004; 2014–present
- Spouse: Rahul Pavanan (m. 2009)
- Children: 1

Abhirami (born 26 July 1983) is an Indian film and voice actress. She has acted predominantly in Tamil, Malayalam and Telugu films and has a few credits in Kannada films. Abhirami went on to establish herself as a leading actress in the 2000s across the Malayalam and Tamil language industries.

Abhirami went on to establish herself as a leading actress in the 2000s across the Malayalam and Tamil language industries after appearing in films such as Sradha (2000), Middle Class Madhavan (2001), Charlie Chaplin (2002), Raktha Kanneeru (2003) and Virumaandi (2004).

== Early life and education ==
She was born as Divya Gopikumar on 26 July 1983, to Gopikumar and Pushpa who were living in Kerala. She attended Christ Nagar English High School and Bharatiya Vidya Bhavan, in Thiruvananthapuram and did predegree training from Mar Ivanios College, Thiruvananthapuram before graduating in programs for psychology and communications from the College of Wooster in Ohio.

Her family migrated to the United States in 2004 when she got a job there. Her parents are yoga instructors in Ohio.

== Career ==
Abhirami made her debut in director Adoor Gopalakrishnan's film Kathapurushan. While in college, Abhirami worked as a TV anchor for the program Top Ten which aired on the Asianet channel, which according to Abhirami was "quite popular" and got her a film offer. She also appeared in the 100-episode Malayalam serial Akshaya Pathram, directed by Sreekumaran Thampi. She changed her screen name to Abhirami, the character name of the heroine of the film Gunaa, being "obsessed with the role and the name".

She had a small role in the Malayalam film Pathram in 1999 and in the series Mercara directed by Jude Attipetty. Later she acted in the films Millennium Stars, Njangal Santhushtaranu, and Sradha before shifting to Tamil cinema.

Her first Tamil film was Vaanavil (2000) opposite Arjun, which was a "big hit" and was followed by Middle Class Madhavan (2001), as well as Dost (2001), Samudhiram (2001) and Samasthanam (2001) with R. Sarathkumar. A notable film in her career was Virumaandi (2004), in which she appeared as a Tamil village girl from Madurai opposite Kamal Haasan. Besides Tamil and Malayalam, she has appeared in Telugu and Kannada films and was a notable Tollywood actress. In 2003, she appeared opposite Upendra in the film Raktha Kanneeru and opposite Shiva Rajkumar in Sri Ram. In 2004, she retired from the film industry and settled in the United States for her studies. She went on to work as the marketing director of an MNC there.

She went on to host Rishimoolam, a talk show on the Tamil television channel Puthuyugam.

After a 10-year hiatus, she returned to the film industry in 2014 and acted in multiple films as a supporting actress until 2021 when she got a role as one of lead actresses in the film Maara after 17 years. She also became a reality show judge through the show Sa Re Ga Ma Pa Li'l Champs (2023). She was cast in the supporting role in the action drama film Vettaiyan (2024) with Rajinikanth. Shen then appeared in the black comedy Jolly O Gymkhana (2024) as well as hyperlink thriller, Once Upon A Time in Madras (2024). She is back on screen with the Ulaganayagan Kamal Haasan in director Mani Ratnam, Thug Life (2025). She reunites with Arjun after 25 years regarding the long gap between Vaanavil (2000) and Blast (2026).

== Personal life ==
Abhirami is married to Rahul Pavanan, grandson of writer Pavanan. The couple have an adopted daughter.

== Filmography ==
=== As actress ===
Key
†	Denotes films that have not yet been released

List of films and roles
Year	Title	Role	Language	Notes	Ref.
1995	Kathapurushan		Malayalam	Child artist	
1999	Pathram	Shilpa Mary Cherian	Malayalam		
1999	Njangal Santhushtaranu	Geethu Sanjeevan	Malayalam		
2000	Millennium Stars	Radha	Malayalam		
2000	Sradha	Swapna	Malayalam		
2000	Melevaryathe Malakhakkuttikal	Devika Variyar (Devu)	Malayalam		
2000	Vaanavil	Priya	Tamil		
2001	Megasandesam	Kavitha	Malayalam		
2001	Middle Class Madhavan	Abhirami	Tamil		
2001	Dosth	Anamika	Tamil		
2001	Samudhiram	Lakshmi	Tamil		
2001	Thank You Subba Rao	Susi	Telugu		
2002	Charlie Chaplin	Mythili Ramakrishnan	Tamil		
2002	Karmegham	Maheswari	Tamil		
2002	Samasthanam	Aishwarya	Tamil		
2003	Laali Haadu	Sangeetha	Kannada		
2003	Sri Ram	Vasundhara	Kannada		
2003	Charminar	Keerthi	Telugu		
2003	Raktha Kanneeru	Chandra	Kannada		
2004	Cheppave Chirugali	Radha	Telugu		
2004	Virumaandi	Annalakshmi	Tamil		
2014	Apothecary	Dr. Nalini Nambiar	Malayalam		
2015	36 Vayadhinile	Susan David	Tamil	Special appearance	
2016	Ithu Thaanda Police	Arundhati Varma	Malayalam		
2016	Ore Mukham	Prof.Latha	Malayalam		
2017	Chowka	Indira Sharma	Kannada		
2018	Amar Akbar Anthony	Amar's mother	Telugu	Special appearance	
2018	Ottakoru Kaamukan	Meera	Malayalam		
2019	Dasharatha	Krutika	Kannada		
2019	Aniyan Kunjum Thannalayathu	Bincy	Malayalam		
2020	Marjara Oru Kallu Vacha Nuna	Chithira	Malayalam		
2021	Maara	Selvi	Tamil	Amazon Prime film	
2021	Sulthan	Annalakshmi	Tamil	Cameo appearance	
2021	Kotigobba 3	IAS Durga	Kannada		
2022	Nitham Oru Vaanam	Dr.Krishnaveni	Tamil		
2023	Are You Ok Baby?	Vidhya	Tamil		
2023	Garudan	Sreedevi Madhav	Malayalam		
2024	Maharaja	Kokila Srilakshmi Selvam	Tamil	SIIMA Award for Best Actress in a Supporting Role	
2024	Saripodhaa Sanivaaram	Chayadevi	Telugu		
2024	Bhale Unnade	Gowri	Telugu		
2024	Vettaiyan	Shwetha Dhakshinamoorthy	Tamil		
2024	Jolly O Gymkhana	Chellamma	Tamil		
2024	Once Upon A Time in Madras	Savitri	Tamil		
2025	Aghathiyaa	Vaidheeshwari	Tamil	Cameo appearance	
2025	Eleven	Shanthi	Tamil; Telugu	Bilingual film	
2025	Thug Life	Jeeva	Tamil		
2025	Bomb	Collector Krishnaammal	Tamil		
2025	Rambo	Rambo's mother	Tamil		
2025	12A Railway Colony	Shalini	Telugu		
2025	Indian Penal Law	Vasanthi	Tamil		
2026	Blast	Neelaveni	Tamil		
2026	Karmakhya		Telugu		
2026	Law and Order	Priya John	Malayalam		

=== As a dubbing artist ===
Year	Title	For whom	Language	Director	Ref.
2013	Vishwaroopam	Pooja Kumar	Tamil	Kamal Haasan	
2015	Uttama Villain	Pooja Kumar	Tamil	Ramesh Aravind	
2018	Vishwaroopam 2	Pooja Kumar	Tamil	Kamal Haasan	

== Television ==
- Top Ten, anchor of musical program (Asianet)
- Piyatha, telefilm (Asianet)
- Akshaya Pathram, (Asianet)
- Annie, telefilm (Kairali TV)
- Rishimoolam, host (Puthuyugam)
- Made For Each Other, host (Mazhavil Manorama)
- Kanakanmani, (Surya TV) as Radhika (Cameo)
- Flowers Oru Kodi (Flowers TV) as Participant
- Red Carpet (Amrita TV) as Mentor
- Oru Kodai Murder Mystery, as Ananthalakshmi (Annie) Varadarajan
- Sa Re Ga Ma Pa Li'l Champs (season 3), (Zee Tamil), Judge
- Shyamambaram (Zee Keralam)
- Goli Soda Rising (Disney+ Hotstar) as Thendral
- Super star, (Amrita TV), Judge
- Mahanadigai, (Zee Tamil), Judge
