= Njangal Santhushtaranu =

- Poster
- Directed by: Rajasenan
- Screenplay by: Rajan Kizhakenala
- Produced by: Thomas Korah; Prem Prakash
- Starring: Jayaram; Abhirami; Narendra Prasad; Jagathy Sreekumar; Oduvil Unnikrishnan; Janardhanan; Cochin Haneefa
- Cinematography: K. P. Nambiathiri
- Music by: Ouseppachan
- Distributed by: Kokers Films; Anupama; Evershine Release
- Release date: 9 July 1999
- Country: India
- Language: Malayalam

Njangal Santhushtaranu (transl. We are happy) is a 1999 Indian Malayalam-language domestic drama film directed by Rajasenan and starring Jayaram and Abhirami in lead roles.

== Plot ==
Sanjeevan IPS is a police commissioner who lives with his widowed father and two younger sisters. Outside of his duty, he is also a singer in the police troupe, alongside his close friend and colleague, Police Constable Salperu Sadanandan, who shares a lively household with his wives, Kamakshi and Meenakshi.

Sanjeevan is engaged to Geethu, the daughter of Rajasekharan Nair IPS, the Director General of Police. Raised in a privileged environment, Geethu has always been showered with love and has grown up with a strong sense of self-confidence. However, she has little experience with the daily struggles of ordinary life and is unfamiliar with many cultural traditions including reading and writing in Malayalam.

After marriage, Geethu finds it challenging to adjust to her new home. She unintentionally clashes with Sanjeevan's sisters due to their different lifestyles and expectations. Sanjeevan, seeing the growing tension, tries to guide her, hoping to help her integrate into the family. However, his approach is often strict, leading to misunderstandings between them.

One day, on her parents 25th wedding anniversary, Sanjeevan gets delayed due to an ongoing investigation and a dangerous confrontation with a gang. Feeling neglected and hurt by their strained relationship, Geethu impulsively plays a prank, reporting to the police control room that Sanjeevan has gone missing. When he returns home safely, the entire family is deeply shaken by the false alarm. Geethu soon realizes the gravity of her actions and expresses remorse for her impulsive decision.

During this time, Geethu's family reveals a long-kept secret, she was adopted as a baby, and their biological son, Manu, was born later. They reassure her that this does not change their love for her, but it prompts Geethu to reflect on her own sense of identity. Overwhelmed, she takes time away at an orphanage to rediscover herself and find clarity.

Sanjeevan, who had known about her adoption all along, never saw it as something that defined her worth. Understanding that their relationship needs to be built on mutual respect and understanding rather than control, he reaches out to her, offering support rather than judgment. With a fresh perspective, Geethu returns home, ready to embrace her new family with a more open heart. Sanjeevan, too, accepts her and together, they embark on a new chapter.

== Cast ==
- Jayaram as City Police Commissioner G. Sanjeevan Pillai IPS
- Abhirami as L.R. Geethu
- Jagathy Sreekumar as Head Constable "Salperu" Sadanandan, Sanjeevan's friend
- Narendra Prasad as DGP Rajasekharan Nair IPS, Geethu's adopted father
- Janardhanan as DIG Idikkula Ittoop IPS
- Oduvil Unnikrishnan as Retd. Head Constable "Marmam" Gopala Pillai, Sanjeevan's father
- Cochin Haneefa as Kannappan, Geethu's uncle
- Seena Antony as Savitri, Sanjeevan's sister
- Namitha S Prem as Sanjeevan's youngest sister
- Manju Pillai as Constable Kamakshi
- N. F. Varghese as Karumoottil Kora
- Bindu Panicker as Soudamini, Geethu's aunt
- Kaviyoor Ponnamma as Mother of the Orphanage
- Paravoor Ramachandran as IG Ashokan IPS
- Bobby Kottarakkara as Govindan, Policeman
- Kochu Preman as Chandran, Policeman
- Jayakumar Parameswaran Pillai as Balan, Policeman
- Pushkala Sivanandan as Lakshmi, Geethu's adopted mother
- Sreekandan Nair as Sreekandan Nair (Show Host)
- Prajeesh Balachandran as Manu, Geethu's younger brother

== Soundtrack ==
The film's soundtrack contains eight songs, all composed by Ouseppachan, with lyrics by S. Ramesan Nair.

#	Title	Singer(s)	Raga(s)
1	"Aanalla Pennalla"	M. G. Sreekumar; Chorus	
2	"Iru Meyyum"	K. J. Yesudas	
3	"Iru Meyyum" (D)	K. J. Yesudas; K. S. Chithra	
4	"Kannil Thiri Thelikkum"	Sujatha Mohan	
5	"Ponnin Valakilukki"	Santhosh Keshav	
6	"Theythey Thaalam"	Santhosh Keshav	
7	"Udayam Vaalkkannezhuthi" (F)	K. S. Chithra	Nattakurinji
8	"Udayam Vaalkkannezhuthi" (M)	K. J. Yesudas	Nattakurinji

== Controversies ==
Even though the movie was a blockbuster, after several years it received criticism due to the male chauvinism in the main plot. Abhirami who played the heroine role in this movie had the same opinion about the film.
