= Jayakumar Parameswaran Pillai =

Indian actor

Jayakumar
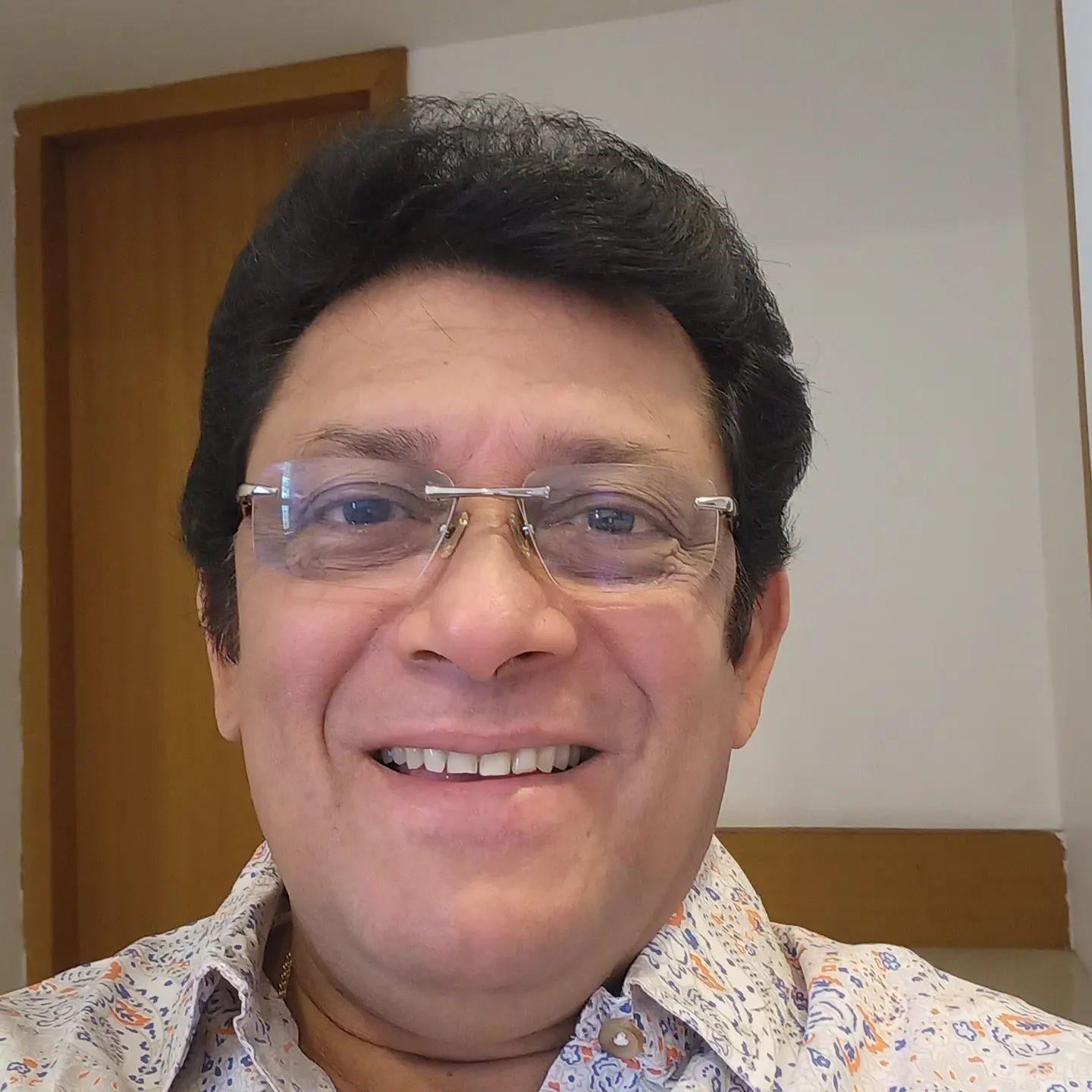
- Born: Jayakumar Parameswaran Pillai; Kollam, Kerala, India
- Occupations: Actor; Cartoonist
- Years active: 1989–present

Jayakumar Parameshwaran Pillai is an Indian actor who appears in Malayalam films and television shows. He is best known for portraying comedic roles, but has also played character roles.

== Acting career ==
He started his career as a theatre artist with professional Nataka Samithi and later associated with Athulya Nataka Samithi. He later started his acting career through jayaram movie Njangal Santhushtaranu and gained popularity through Thatteem Mutteem started in 2011.

== Television ==
Year	Title	Role	Channel	Notes
	Bhagyanakshatram		DD Malayalam	Lead role / Debut
	Marubhoomiyil Pookkalam		DD Malayalam	
2005	Aalipazham		Surya TV	
2006	Ohari		Amrita TV	
2007	Nombarapoovu		Asianet	
2007	Sreeguruvayoorappan		Surya TV	
2009–2011	Autograph	Sasi	Asianet	
2011–2012	Parinayam		Mazhavil Manorama	
2012–2023	Thatteem Mutteem	Arjunan	Mazhavil Manorama	Main lead
2012–2013	Malakhamar	Kunjappy	Mazhavil Manorama	
2012	Chandralekha		Asianet	
2013	Sthreedhanam		Asianet	
2014	Njgal Santhushtaranu	Raveendra Varma	Asianet Plus	
2014–2018	Karuthamuthu	Sadanam Sadhu	Asianet	
2015	Uggram Ujjwalam	Kavi Arjuna	Mazhavil Manorama	Reality show
2016/ 2021	Marimayam	Kavi Arjuna	Mazhavil Manorama	Crossover episodes with Thateem Muttem
2017	5 Star Thattukada	Madhavan	Asianet Plus	
2017	Padmasree Padmavathy	Padmanabhan	Amrita TV	
2019	Suharayum Suhasiniyum	Gandhian	Asianet	Telefilm
2020	Funny Nights	various roles	Zee Keralam	Comedy Chat show
2020	Comedy stars season 2	various roles	Asianet	reality show
2020–2021	Swantham Sujatha	Jayan	Surya TV	
2021	Madhavi Naadu Vaanidum Kalam	Vasu	Kaumudy TV	Telefilm
2021–2022	Urulakku Upperi	Manikuttan	Amrita TV	
2021	Appanum Koppanum	Jyotsyan Babuleya Panicker	YouTube	Short film
2023	Varan Doctoraanu	Constable Manoharan a.k.a. Ammavan	Kaumudy TV	
2024–2025	Surabhiyum Suhasiniyum 2	Krishnanunni	Flowers TV	
2025–2026	Teacheramma	Sivaraman	Asianet	
2026	Ivar Vivahitharayal	Achyuthan	Asianet	

Other Shows

- Sell me the answer (Asianet)
- Onnum Onnum Moonu (Mazhavil Manorama)
- Take it easy (Mazhavil Manorama)
- Minute to win it (Mazhavil Manorama)

== Filmography ==
=== Films ===
Key
†	Denotes films that have not yet been released

- All films are in Malayalam language unless otherwise noted.

Year	Title	Role	Notes
1997	The Car	Autorickshaw Driver	
1999	Njangal Santhushtaranu	Police Officer	
2000	Nadan Pennum Natupramaniyum	Govindan's employee	
2002	Nakshathrakkannulla Rajakumaran Avanundoru Rajakumari		
2016	Swarna Kaduva	Father	
2017	Kadhantharam		
2017	Haddiya		
2017	Adventures of Omanakuttan		
2017	Sarvopari Palakkaran		
2018	Chalakkudykkaran Changathi		
2019	Nithyaharitha Nayakan		
2019	Ningal Camera Nireekshnathilanu		
2019	Vazhuthana	Kamalasanan	Short film
2019	Chila New Gen Naatuvisheshangal		
2021	Backpackers	Ammachan	
2021	Dinkanaka	Singer	Music album
2022	Santacruz		
2022	Pathonpatham Noottandu	Appu Kurup	
2023	2018	Ravi	
2023	Swachandamruthyu	Jayan	
2023	Thee		
2023	Kallanum Bhagavathiyum	Autodriver Kodamani	
2023	Padmini	Principal	
2024	Vayasethrayaayi? Muppathiee..!!	Sulu's brother	
2024	Iyer In Arabia	Major Soman Pillai	
2024	Anandapuram Diaries	Divakaran	
2024	Nunakkuzhi	Magistrate	
2024	Manorathangal		Segment: Swargam Thurakkuna Samayam
2024	Raghu Thatha	Sundarapandian	Tamil film
2026	Thudakkam	Tahsildar	

== Awards ==
Asianet Television Awards

- 2015: Special Jury award for Humorous role – Karuthamuthu
- 2016: Best actor in a humorous role – Karuthamuthu

Asianet Comedy Awards

- 2016: Best actor in a humorous role – Karuthamuthu

poovachal Kader award

- 2023: Best comedian -Thatteem Mutteem
