= Syamdhar =

Indian film director

- Born: Ernakulam, Kerala
- Citizenship: Indian
- Occupation: Film director
- Years active: 2013–present

Syamdhar is an Indian film director who works in the Malayalam film industry. Prithviraj starrer 7th Day is his debut movie as a director, which was a crime thriller. In 2017, he made his second movie Pullikkaran Staraa with Mammootty.

== Filmography ==
| Year | Title | Language | Cast | Notes |
|---|---|---|---|---|
| 2014 | 7th Day | Malayalam | Prithviraj Sukumaran, Janani Iyer, Tovino Thomas, Anu Mohan | Debut film |
| 2017 | Pullikkaran Staraa | Malayalam | Mammootty, Innocent | |
