= James & Alice =

James And Alice
- poster
- Directed by: Sujith Vaassudev
- Screenplay by: Dr S. Janardhanan
- Story by: Sujith Vaassudev
- Produced by: Dr S Saji Kumar; Krishnan Sethukumar
- Starring: Prithviraj Sukumaran; Vedhika; Sijoy Varghese; Parvati Nair
- Cinematography: Sujith Vaassudev
- Edited by: Samjith Mohammed
- Music by: Gopi Sundar
- Production company: Dharmik Films
- Distributed by: Srivari Films
- Release date: 5 May 2016
- Country: India
- Language: Malayalam
- Budget: ₹6 Crores
- Box office: ₹13 Crores

James & Alice is a 2016 Indian Malayalam-language fantasy romantic drama film written and directed by Sujith Vaassudev (in his directorial debut). starring Prithviraj Sukumaran and Vedhika in the lead roles. The music was composed by Gopi Sundar. The film was released on 5 May 2016.

== Synopsis ==
James is a talented artist and businessman. His wife Alice works in a bank. They get married against Alice's father's wish due to his lack of a career, but since then have led successful marriage for seven years and have a child out of it. However, the seven-year itch starts with both of them focused on their respective careers. Their busy lifestyles and misunderstandings results in filing a divorce. A day before divorce, James meets with a freaky car accident. In the hospital, facing a coma James hallucinates/dreams St.Peter's presence and both of them review his life; his mistakes and the changes he could've done. Whether James realises his mistakes and is able to come back to his life forms the crux of the movie.

== Cast ==
- Prithviraj Sukumaran as James
- Vedhika as Alice (voice dubbed by Angel Shijoy)
- Sijoy Varghese as St. Peter, (voice dubbed by Anoop Menon)
- Sai Kumar as Davis Thekkeparambil
- Kishor Satya as Dr Alexander
- Parvathy Nair as Nandana Varma/Nandu
- Manju Pillai as Advocate Rohini
- Emine Salman as Isabel (Pinky)
  - Anupama Parameswaran as Isabel (Adult Pinky)
- Vijayaraghavan as Dr. Mohan
- Sudheer Karamana as K T Annan
- Arjun Nandhakumar as Yoga Thinesh
- Shaani Shiki as Mithun
- Sudheesh as Subin
- Indrans as Abraham
- Tini Tom as Kazoo
- Ganapathi as Ibrahim
- Adil Ibrahim as Soubin
- Neeraj Madhav as Sketch
- Naseer Sankranthi as K.T Annan's P.A
- Biju Menon as Rohini's Husband (only in a photo)
- Puneeth Rajkumar as Appu (only in special appearance)

== Production ==
The filming began on 15 January 2016. Prithviraj and Vedhika previously acted together in Kaaviya Thalaivan (2014). Movie shooting was wrapped on March 31, 2016.

== Soundtrack ==
James & Alice

Soundtrack album by Gopi Sundar
- Released: 29 April 2016
- Recorded: 2016
- Venues: Chennai & Kochi
- Studio: Sunsa Digital Workstation
- Genre: Feature film soundtrack
- Length: 14:30
- Label: Muzik 247
- Producer: Gopi Sundar

Gopi Sundar chronology
Ennul Aayiram (2016)	James & Alice (2016)	School Bus (2016)
External audio
- Official Audio Jukebox on YouTube

Anil Johnson was signed in as the composer first. But he opted out before filming had begun. Music was composed by Gopi Sundar, and released on Muzik 247 label.

Track list
No.	Title	Lyrics	Singer(s)	Length
1.	"Mazhaye"	Harinarayanan B K	Karthik, Abhaya Hiranmayi	4:15
2.	"Nenjin"	Mochitha	Sayanora Philip	4:36
3.	"Udanjuvo"	Harinarayanan B K	Sayanora Philip	5:39
Total length:				14:30

== Release ==
Initially James & Alice was scheduled to release on 29 April 2016, later postponed and released on 5 May 2016.

== Reception ==
=== Critical reception ===
The Times of India gave 2.5 out of 5 stars stating "The story arc of James and Alice is quite in sync with the analogy. Presented in a fragmented, flashback-heavy style, the movie is a simple portrait of a contemporary relationship, of a young family that is going through a rocky patch". Malayala Manorama gave 2.5 out of 5 stars stating "An exceedingly slow-paced film, with less humour or other remarkable agents, James and Alice isn't everyone's cup of tea. The feather touch of something celestial keeps it engaging, but the magic, sadly wanes". IndiaGlitz gave 2.5 out of 5 stars stating "Sujith Vasudev has done well for a directorial debut. There are certain elements that he will have to tweak to work for the larger audience. Gopi Sunder at the music section has done well yet again. The visually alluring frames need a special mention and the cinematographer has done well to give an artistic rendering to the tale".

== Home media ==
James & Alice DVD was released on Satyam Audios on 22 July 2016.

== Awards and nominations ==
Date of ceremony	Award	Category	Recipient(s) and nominee(s)	Result	Ref.
18 November 2016	Asiavision Awards	Outstanding Performance of the Year	Vedhika	Won	
20 January 2017	Asianet Film Awards	Best Actress	Vedhika	Nominated	
20 January 2017	Asianet Film Awards	Special Jury Award	Sijoy Varghese	Won	
17 June 2017	Filmfare Awards South	Best Male Playback Singer – Malayalam	Karthik	Nominated	
30 June and 1 July 2017	South Indian International Movie Awards	Best Actress – Malayalam	Vedhika	Nominated	
