= Avatharam (2014 Malayalam film) =

- Theatrical release poster
- Directed by: Joshiy
- Written by: Vyaasan Edavanakadu
- Produced by: Udaykrishna; Siby K. Thomas; Dileep K. Kunnath; Vyaasan Edavanakadu
- Starring: Dileep; Lakshmi Menon; Sijoy Varghese; Joy Mathew; Mithun Ramesh
- Cinematography: R. D. Rajasekhar
- Edited by: Shyam Sasidharan
- Music by: Deepak Dev
- Production company: Four B Productions
- Distributed by: Popcorn Entertainments Australia
- Release date: 1 August 2014
- Running time: 165 minutes
- Country: India
- Language: Malayalam

Avatharam (transl. Incarnation) is a 2014 Indian Malayalam-language action thriller film directed by Joshiy, written by Vyaasan Edavanakadu, and produced by Udaykrishna, Siby K. Thomas, Dileep K. Kunnath, and Vyaasan Edavanakadu. It stars Dileep, Lakshmi Menon, Sijoy Varghese, Joy Mathew and Mithun Ramesh. The film was released on 1 August 2014.

== Plot ==
Madhavan Mahadevan, an engineering post-graduate who is a social worker from Idukki. He comes to Kochi with sister-in-law Valsala and her daughter Anjali after the death of his elder brother Customs Officer Sudhakaran. He is in Cochin to know the mystery behind his brother's death. He visits LIC office claiming the insurance amount of Sudhakaran. Manimekhala is authorised to deal with claims. From the LIC advisor, he realises that Sudhakaran's death is a well-planned murder.

He later decides to find the mystery behind the death. Meanwhile, he falls in love with Manimekhala. He discovers that CI Jeevan, who works for an underworld don Karimban John and his brother Joby is involved in the murder. Since then, Madhavan has killed everyone who killed Sudhakaran, except John. Just before the end of the story, he understands that Sudhakaran was murdered by Sri Rama Krishnamoorthy alias SRK, an influential politician with many criminal dealings. ACP Gautham Vishwanath reaches and takes Moorthy into his custody. Soon receives a call informing him of a nearby protest between John, his henchmen and his rival Jabbar's father, brother Jamal and their henchmen. When Gautham and the police fights John's and Jabbar's men, Madhavan kills Moorthy by creating a blast in Gautham's car in which Moorthy was handcuffed. John kills Jamal and later he gets killed by Jabbar's father. After completing all his revenge, Madhavan takes his now pregnant wife, Manimegala back home.

== Cast ==
- Dileep as Madhavan Mahadevan
- Lakshmi Menon as Manimekala (Manikutty), Madhavan's lover and wife (voiceover by Devi S.)
- Sijoy Varghese as ACP Gautham Viswanath IPS
- Joy Mathew as Karimban John
- Mithun Ramesh as Karimban Joby
- Babu Namboothiri as Sri Ramakrishna Moorthy (S. R. K.)
- Ganesh Kumar as Sudhakaran, Madhavan's elder brother
- Sreejaya Nair as Valsala George, Madhavan's sister-in-law and Sudhakaran's wife
- Anju Aravind as Leelamma
- Baby Drishya as Anjali
- Shammi Thilakan as CI Jeevan
- Kannan Pattambi as Karimban Chacko
- Devan as Dr. Mathew Philip
- Janardhanan as Mahadevan, Sudhakaran's and Madhavan's father
- Kaviyoor Ponnamma as Lalitha, Sudhakaran's and Madhavan's mother
- Chali Pala as Krishnankutty, Colony secretary
- Nandu Poduval as Pappachan
- Balaji Sarma as Bhadran
- Prem Prakash as Narendran, LIC advisor
- Shiju as Jabbar
- V. K. Sreeraman as Hakkim, Jabbar's father
- Prasanth Alexander as Jamal, Jabbar's younger brother
- Baiju V.K as Musthafa
- Ambika Mohan as Saraswathy, Moorthy's wife
- Valsala Menon as John's mother
- Vinaya Prasad as John's wife
- Lakshmipriya as John's sister
- Anil Murali as Tipper George
- Lishoy as Valsala's father
- Gayathri as Valsala's mother
- Ponnamma Babu as Manimeghala's aunt
- Sathaar as Commissioner
- Geetha Oommen Mathew as Madhavan's neighbour
- Joju George as Surendran (guest appearance)
- Kalabhavan Shajohn as Sundaresan (guest appearance)
- Siddique as Divakaran (guest appearance)
- Shivaji Guruvayoor as Advt. Thomas
- Idavela Babu as Babu, Sundaresan's colleague
- Thesni Khan as Priya, Sundaresan's wife

== Music ==
The music of the film is composed by Deepak Dev with lyrics penned by Kaithapram Damodaran Namboothiri and Harinarayan. The music album has two songs:

Track	Song title	Singer(s)
1	"Konji Konji"	Shankar Mahadevan, Rimi Tomy
2	"Njaan kanum"	Nivas

== Release ==
The film was released on 1 August 2014.
