= ManoramaMAX =

Indian video-on Demands

- Logo used since 2019
- Company type: Subsidiary
- Website type: OTT platform
- Country of origin: India
- Area served: India and Gulf Cooperation Council
- Owner: Malayala Manorama
- Industry: Entertainment, mass media
- Website: manoramamax.com
- Launched: 1 September 2019; 7 years ago
- Current status: Active

ManoramaMAX is an Indian subscription video on-demand and over-the-top streaming service, owned and operated by MM TV Ltd. It was launched on 1 September 2019. The app combines the offerings of Mazhavil Manorama and Manorama News. It is an on-demand video streaming platform providing entertainment and news exclusively in Malayalam language.

ManoramaMAX is currently available on Web, Android, iOS, LG Smart TV (WebOS), Samsung TV (Tizen), Roku, Apple TV, Fire TV and Google Chromecast.

== Content ==
ManoramaMAX's content includes news, shows and movies.

== Programming ==
It also hosts many Malayalam films for streaming.

=== Original programs ===
Shows

Title	Genre	Premiere	Cast(s)
CID MAX	chat show	2021	Anju Joseph
D studio	Reality show	2021	
Little talk	Chat show	2022	Parvathy
Fans5'	Chat show	2022	Parvathy
Actors round table season 1,2	talk show	2022-2024	Gayatri Arun
nanasilakki kalanjallo	Chat show	2022	
Tune and Tales	Chat show	2023	Amrutha Suresh
Top Anchor	reality show	2023	Meenakshi, Karthik Surya, Sabumon Abdusamad, Nyla Usha
Chill and Chat	Chat Show	2023-2024	Parvathy, Dain Davis
Crazy stars	Chat show	2023-2024	Jeevan Joseph, Srividya
The reel Story	Comedy	2023	Manju Warrier, Akhilsha
Open Heart	Chat show	2024	Amrutha Suresh
Picture Perfect	Chat show	2024	RJ Twinkle

Series,/Films

Title	Genre	Premiere	Cast(s)
Ullam	Web series	2020	
Life Jor	Web series	2020	Hakkim shah, Malavika Krishnadas, Thejus
Something something like love	Web series	2021	Hakkim Shah
Pandaraparambil house	Web series	2021	Archana Kavi
Nishkalank people	Web series	2021	
Menaka season 1,2	Web series	2021-2022	Ashwin Kumar
Where we stand	Web series	2022	
Mrs and Mr Silly	Web series	2022	
Her	Film	2024	Urvashi, Parvathy Thiruvothu, Aishwarya Rajesh, Remya Nambeesan
Soul Stories	Web series	2024	Archana Ravi, Dayana Hameed,Suhasini Maniratnam
