= Bramayugam (soundtrack) =

2024 soundtrack album by Christo Xavier

- Soundtrack album cover

Soundtrack album by Christo Xavier
- Released: 25 January 2024
- Recorded: 2023–2024
- Genre: Feature film soundtrack
- Length: 18:48
- Language: Malayalam
- Label: Night Shift Records
- Producer: Christo Xavier

Christo Xavier chronology
Journey of Love 18+ (2023)	Bramayugam (2024)	Turbo (2024)

Bramayugam is the soundtrack to the 2024 film of the same name directed by Rahul Sadasivan and produced by Chakravarthy Ramachandra and S. Sashikanth under YNOT Studios and Night Shift Studios, respectively, starring Mammootty, Arjun Ashokan and Sidharth Bharathan. The film's musical score is composed by Christo Xavier whose soundtrack consisted of five songs written by Din Nath Puthenchery and Ammu Maria Alex, and an instrumental theme. The soundtrack was released under Night Shift Records on 25 January 2024.

== Development ==
Christo Xavier was recommended by the film's cinematographer Shehnad Jalal to Sadasivan, as he was also involved in Madanolsavam (2023) which was Xavier's composition debut. Sadasivan called Xavier during the scripting process and asked him to produce a demo based on a short sketch of the film, which worked and eventually produced several demos from the sketches of the film's script. His involvement was officially confirmed during the film's launch.

Since the film is set in the 17th century, recreating the period through the film's music was considered to be challenging. Xavier had an idea to construct a pulluvakudam—a string instrument with a percussion sound—but eventually ended on using a waterphone—an instrument used to produce soundscape for horror films—to bring an epic feel. Xavier and his friend Akhil Jo built two waterphones to get the notes and soundscape, as the instrument being expensive to be purchased. He further made a sound system using a string of guitar in a plastic bucket and tin oil pots which was heard in the film's theme music and used didgeridoos to modify the soundscapes. Sadasivan mentored Xavier throughout the music sessions, while Xavier was on the sets during the production. During the Onam celebrations, Xavier met Mammootty and shared the instrumental theme "Kodumon Potti" which the latter liked it and praised his work. Girish Puthenchery's son Din Nath made his debut as a lyricist, after Sadasivan suggested him to Xavier. Din Nath wrote four out of five original songs.

The fifth and sixth track "The Beginning" and "The Age of Madness" consisted of electronic music elements blending with the periodic classical setting. The producer Ramachandra's insistence on an electronic track led to the composition of "The Age of Madness". Xavier provided vocals for the original songs while Atheena and Sayanth S co-contributed the vocals.

== Release ==
On New Year's Day (1 January 2024), Night Shift Studios unveiled the subsidiary music label Night Shift Records, with Bramayugam becoming the first soundtrack to be released under the label. The six-song soundtrack was released on 25 January, without revealing singles from the album. The soundtracks for the dubbed Telugu, Tamil, Kannada and Hindi versions were unveiled on 1 and 5 February 2024.

== Track listing ==
=== Malayalam ===
No.	Title	Lyrics	Singer(s)	Length
1.	"Kodumon Potti" (Theme)	—	Instrumental	1:39
2.	"Poomani Maalika"	Ammu Maria Alex	Christo Xavier	3:09
3.	"Thambaye"	Din Nath Puthenchery	Christo Xavier	2:02
4.	"Aadithyan Illathe"	Din Nath Puthenchery	Christo Xavier	3:31
5.	"The Beginning"	Din Nath Puthenchery	Christo Xavier, Atheena	3:41
6.	"The Age of Madness"	Din Nath Puthenchery	Christo Xavier, Sayanth S	4:43
Total length:				18:16

=== Telugu ===
All lyrics are written by Purna Chary.

No.	Title	Singer(s)	Length
1.	"Kodumon Potti" (Theme)	Instrumental	1:39
2.	"Punnaga Poodhota"	Sai Vignesh	3:09
3.	"Ee Maha Lokaana"	Sai Vignesh	2:02
4.	"Sooreede Lekunte"	Sai Vignesh	3:31
5.	"The Beginning"	Sai Vignesh, Atheena	3:41
6.	"The Age of Madness"	Christo Xavier, Sai Vignesh, Sayanth S	4:43
Total length:			18:16

=== Tamil ===
All lyrics are written by Madhurakavi.

No.	Title	Singer(s)	Length
1.	"Kodumon Potti" (Theme)	Instrumental	1:39
2.	"Poomani Maligai"	Sreekanth Hariharan	3:09
3.	"Sengone"	Sreekanth Hariharan	2:02
4.	"Aadhavan Illaadha"	Sreekanth Hariharan	3:31
5.	"The Beginning"	Sreekanth Hariharan, Atheena	3:41
6.	"The Age of Madness"	Christo Xavier, Sreekanth Hariharan, Sayanth S	4:43
Total length:			18:16

=== Kannada ===
All lyrics are written by V. Manohar.

No.	Title	Singer(s)	Length
1.	"Kodumon Potti" (Theme)	Instrumental	1:39
2.	"Bhoomiya Maalika"	Sai Vignesh	3:09
3.	"Ee Maha Lokadi"	Sai Vignesh	2:02
4.	"Aadityanillade"	Sai Vignesh	3:31
5.	"The Beginning"	Sai Vignesh, Atheena	3:41
6.	"The Age of Madness"	Christo Xavier, Sai Vignesh, Sayanth S	4:43
Total length:			18:16

=== Hindi ===
All lyrics are written by Riya Mukherjee.

No.	Title	Singer(s)	Length
1.	"Kodumon Potti" (Theme)	Instrumental	1:39
2.	"Poojaniye Maalik"	Sreekanth Hariharan	3:09
3.	"Ho Tum Hi"	Sreekanth Hariharan	2:02
4.	"Timir Hai"	Sreekanth Hariharan	3:31
6.	"The Age of Madness"	Christo Xavier, Sreekanth Hariharan, Sayanth S	4:43
Total length:			18:16

Sanskrit

No.	Title	Singer(s)	Length
1.	"The Beginning"	Sreekanth Hariharan, Atheena	3:41

== Background score ==
Bramayugam

Film score by Christo Xavier
- Released: 25 May 2024
- Recorded: 2023–2024
- Genre: Film score
- Length: 1h 21m 17s
- Language: Malayalam
- Label: Night Shift Records
- Producer: Christo Xavier

The background score was arranged and composed by Christo Xavier.

Bramayugam (Original Background Score)
No.	Title	Length
1.	"Yakshi"	3:26
2.	"Lost"	2:08
3.	"The Humble Abode"	2:12
4.	"Kodumon Potti"	2:47
5.	"Labyrinth"	2:35
6.	"Fate"	1:59
7.	"The Invitation"	1:45
8.	"Game of Dice"	2:29
9.	"Bow Down Dog"	2:14
10.	"The Gift of Varahi"	2:35
11.	"Serpent's Dance"	2:26
12.	"Deluge of Dread"	3:01
13.	"Mother"	2:45
14.	"The Escape"	3:20
15.	"The Valley of Flowers"	0:58
16.	"The Reveal"	4:12
17.	"The Magical Lamp"	2:16
18.	"Key to Freedom"	1:03
19.	"The Collapse"	1:02
20.	"The Last Supper"	1:28
21.	"Face the Fear"	1:41
22.	"The Deceit"	2:07
23.	"Varahi's Box"	1:23
24.	"Hunt the Hunter"	1:08
25.	"Showdown"	3:25
26.	"Mind Games"	2:46
27.	"Fall of the Tyrant"	5:54
28.	"The Goblin"	1:24
29.	"Ring of Power"	3:53
30.	"Freedom"	1:32
31.	"Dawn of an Era"	1:00
Total length:		73:42

== Reception ==
Anandu Suresh of The Indian Express complimented the music to be "as brilliant as it can be, allowing the spirit of the age of madness to rise from within and sail above audiences". Anna Mathews of The Times of India described it as "fantastic". Vignesh Madhu of Cinema Express wrote "Christo Xavier and the sound team did a fabulous job in elevating the movie-watching experience." Arjun Menon of Rediff.com wrote "The rousing musical score by Christo Xavier is pulsating and adds life to the film's not-so-hurried pacing and atmospherics." Akshay PR of DT Next said that Xavier "pulls up with his scores building the ambience for the story." A critic from News18 added that the soundtrack "sets the tone for the film".
