= M. R. Rajakrishnan =

Indian audiographer

Rajakrishnan M.R.
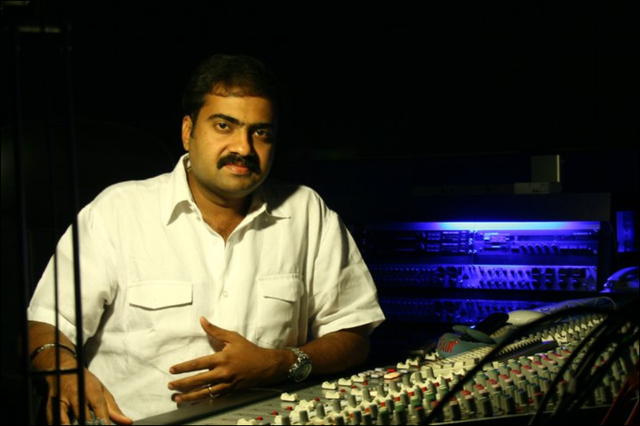
- Born: 25 May 1977 (age 49); Thiruvanthapuram, Kerala, India
- Occupations: Sound designer; Re-recording mixer; Sound mixer
- Years active: 1999–present
- Children: Gouri Parvathy
- Parents: M.G. Radhakrishnan; Padmaja Radhakrishnan

Medayil Radhakrishnan Rajakrishnan (born 25 May 1977) is an Indian sound designer. He won the National Film Award for Best Audiography in 2019 for the film Rangasthalam (2018). He won Kerala State Film Award for Audio mixing in 2011 for the films Urumi, Chaappa Kurish and in 2012 for the film Manchadikuru and a Pearl award by Kerala film Producers Association for the film Manchadikuru in 2013. He has worked across Tamil, Hindi, Kannada, Telugu, Marathi and Malayalam films.

== Early life ==
Rajakrishnan was born on 25 May 1977 in Thiruvanthapuram, Kerala, India. His father, M. G. Radhakrishnan, was one of the most renowned music directors of the Malayalam film industry and a maestro of Carnatic Music. His mother, Padmaja Radhakrishnan, had set her stage in the field of Art and Literature. His grandparents, Malabar Gopalan Nair and Kamalakshi Amma were also musicians. His uncle M. G. Sreekumar is a famous singer in Malayalam.

He practiced Carnatic music under his aunt, a renowned Carnatic vocalist, Dr. K. Omanakutty and also studied mridangam under the guidance of Mavelikara Krishnankutty Nair and Thripunithura Radhakrishnan. He completed his bachelor's degree in economics. He later did his course in sound designing from Chethana Studio, Thrissur.

== Career ==
At the early age of 23, Rajakrishnan worked with Deepan Chatterji as an assistant sound engineer. He has assisted him in around 70 films, which includes Balothekko (Bengali), which secured National Award in the year 2004. He later joined Four Frames Sound Company, Chennai as an assistant sound engineer and now works as the chief sound engineer for the same. He has worked with most of the directors in Malayalam and has done sound designing and mixing for over 200 films in various languages which includes Malayalam, Hindi, Tamil, Kannada, Marathi, Telugu and Bengali.

Rajakrishnan has also composed music for the film Winter (directed by Dipu Karunakaran) with his uncle, M.G. Sreekumar, on the vocals. He has also done jingles for directors such as Priyadarshan and Major Ravi.

== Awards ==
- 2023 National Films Awards–Special Mention for Re-Recording Mixer - Animal
- 2019 National Film Awards for Best Audiography - Rangasthalam
- 2015: Kerala State Film Award for Best Sound Mixing - Charlie (Malayalam)
- 2013: Kerala State Film Award for Best Sound Mixing - Chaappa Kurish and Urumi
- 2013: Pearl Award for Best Sound Design - Manchadikuru (Malayalam)
- 2012: Kerala State Film Award for Best Sound Mixing - Manchadikuru (Malayalam)
- 2012: Surya TV Award For Best Sound Designer - Urumi
- 2011: Reporter Channel Award for Best Sound Mixing - Urumi
- 2011: Kerala State Film Awards for his work in Urumi
- 2006: Kerala Film Critics Award for Best Sound Mixing - Keerthichakra
- 2006: Amritha Fertanity Award for Best Audiography - Ananthabadhram

== Filmography ==
| Year | Title | Language | Notes |
|---|---|---|---|
| 2005 | Navarasa | Tamil | |
| 2005 | Anandabhadram | Malayalam | Amritha Fertanity Award for Best Audiography |
| 2006 | E | Tamil | |
| 2006 | Keerthi Chakra | Malayalam | Kerala Film Critics Award for Best Sound Mixing |
| 2006 | Classmates | Malayalam | |
| 2006 | Achanurangatha Veedu | Malayalam | |
| 2007 | Prarambha | Kannada | |
| 2007 | Bhool Bhulaiya | Hindi | |
| 2008 | Kanchivaram | Tamil | |
| 2008 | Mulla | Malayalam | |
| 2008 | Minnaminnikoottam | Malayalam | |
| 2008 | Manjadikuru | Malayalam | Kerala State Film Award for Best Sound Mixing; Pearl Award for Best Sound Design |
| 2008 | Calcutta News | Malayalam | |
| 2008 | Tahaan | Hindi | |
| 2009 | Winter | Malayalam | |
| 2009 | Neelathamara | Malayalam | |
| 2009 | Sukhanth | Marathi | |
| 2009 | De Dana Dan | Hindi | |
| 2010 | Madrasapattinam | Tamil | |
| 2010 | Elsamma Enna Aankutty | Malayalam | |
| 2010 | Cocktail | Malayalam | |
| 2010 | Aakrosh | Hindi | |
| 2011 | Mayakkam Enna | Tamil | |
| 2011 | Deiva Thirumagal | Tamil | |
| 2011 | Urumi | Malayalam | Kerala State Film Award for Best Sound Mixing; Surya TV Award For Best Sound Designer; Reporter Channel Award for Best Sound Mixing |
| 2011 | Traffic | Malayalam | |
| 2011 | Kunjaliyan | Malayalam | |
| 2011 | Chaappa Kurish | Malayalam | Kerala State Film Award for Best Sound Mixing |
| 2011 | Arabeem Ottakom P. Madhavan Nayarum in Oru Marubhoomikkadha | Malayalam | |
| 2012 | Velayudham | Tamil | |
| 2012 | Thaandavam | Tamil | |
| 2012 | Pizza | Tamil | |
| 2012 | Maalai Pozhudhin Mayakathilaey | Tamil | |
| 2012 | Ustad Hotel | Malayalam | |
| 2012 | Theevram | Malayalam | |
| 2012 | Thattathin Marayathu | Malayalam | |
| 2012 | Spanish Masala | Malayalam | |
| 2012 | Shutter | Malayalam | |
| 2012 | Puthiya Theerangal | Malayalam | |
| 2012 | Masters | Malayalam | |
| 2012 | Grandmaster | Malayalam | |
| 2012 | Diamond Necklace | Malayalam | |
| 2012 | Ayalum Njanum Thammil | Malayalam | |
| 2012 | 101 Weddings | Malayalam | |
| 2013 | Thalaivaa | Tamil | |
| 2013 | Soodhu Kavvum | Tamil | |
| 2013 | Paradesi | Tamil | |
| 2013 | Idharkuthane Aasaipattai Balakumara | Tamil | |
| 2013 | Chennaiyil Oru Naal | Tamil | |
| 2013 | Thira | Malayalam | |
| 2013 | Romans | Malayalam | |
| 2013 | Red Wine | Malayalam | |
| 2013 | Pullipulikalum Aattinkuttiyum | Malayalam | |
| 2013 | Papilio Buddha | Malayalam | |
| 2013 | Neram | Malayalam | |
| 2013 | Nadodimannan | Malayalam | |
| 2013 | Mumbai Police | Malayalam | |
| 2013 | Kalimannu | Malayalam | |
| 2013 | Immanuel | Malayalam | |
| 2013 | Geethaanjali | Malayalam | |
| 2013 | Ezhu Sundara Rathrikal | Malayalam | |
| 2013 | Escape from Uganda | Malayalam | |
| 2013 | 1983 | Malayalam | |
| 2014 | Saivam | Tamil | |
| 2014 | Mundasupatti | Tamil | |
| 2014 | Jigarthanda | Tamil | |
| 2014 | Cuckoo | Tamil | |
| 2014 | Unnimoolam | Malayalam | |
| 2014 | Om Shanti Oshana | Malayalam | |
| 2014 | Mr. Fraud | Malayalam | |
| 2014 | Bangalore Days | Malayalam | |
| 2015 | Oru Naal Iravil | Tamil | |
| 2015 | Maya | Tamil | |
| 2015 | Kaaka Muttai | Tamil | |
| 2015 | Idhu Enna Maayam | Tamil | |
| 2015 | 36 Vayadhinile | Tamil | |
| 2015 | 144 | Tamil | |
| 2015 | Premam | Malayalam | |
| 2015 | Amar Akbar Anthony | Malayalam | |
| 2015 | Charlie | Malayalam | Kerala State Film Award for Best Sound Mixing |
| 2015 | Jo and The Boy | Malayalam | |
| 2015 | Kunjiramayanam | Malayalam | |
| 2015 | Mili | Malayalam | |
| 2015 | Lord Livingstone 7000 Kandi | Malayalam | |
| 2016 | Tharai Thappattai | Tamil | |
| 2016 | Sometimes | Tamil | |
| 2016 | Oattathoodhuvan-1854 | Tamil | |
| 2016 | Mo | Tamil | |
| 2016 | Dhuruvangal Pathinaaru | Tamil | |
| 2016 | Kali | Malayalam | |
| 2016 | Action Hero Biju | Malayalam | |
| 2016 | Guppy | Malayalam | |
| 2016 | Kirik Party | Kannada | |
| 2017 | Vikram Vedha | Tamil | |
| 2017 | Take Off | Malayalam | |
| 2017 | Oru Mexican Aparatha | Malayalam | |
| 2017 | Jomonte Suvisheshangal | Malayalam | |
| 2017 | Godha | Malayalam | |
| 2017 | Ezra | Malayalam | |
| 2018 | Rangasthalam | Telugu | National Film Award for Best Sound Mixing |
| 2018 | Asuraguru | Tamil | |
| 2018 | The Backstager | Malayalam | |
| 2019 | Pressure Cooker | Telugu | |
| 2019 | George Reddy | Telugu | |
| 2019 | Dear Comrade | Telugu | |
| 2019 | Nerkonda Paarvai | Tamil | |
| 2019 | Mei | Tamil | |
| 2019 | Kannum Kannum Kollaiyadithaal | Tamil | |
| 2019 | Devi 2 | Tamil | |
| 2019 | Adithya Varma | Tamil | |
| 2019 | Sathyam Paranja Viswasikkuvo | Malayalam | |
| 2019 | Prathi Poovankozhi | Malayalam | |
| 2019 | Pathinettam Padi | Malayalam | |
| 2019 | Margamkali | Malayalam | |
| 2019 | Marakkar: Arabikadalinte Simham | Malayalam | |
| 2019 | Kettyolaanu Ente Malakha | Malayalam | |
| 2019 | Kalki | Malayalam | |
| 2019 | Evvarikee Cheppoddu | Malayalam | |
| 2019 | Children's Park | Malayalam | |
| 2019 | Avane Srimannarayana | Kannada | |
| 2019 | Kabir Singh | Hindi | |
| 2021 | Navarasa | Tamil | |
| 2021 | Kuruthi | Malayalam | |
| 2021 | Hero | Kannada | |
| 2022 | Bro Daddy | Malayalam | |
| 2022 | Jana Gana Mana | Malayalam | |
| 2022 | Dear Friend | Malayalam | |
| 2022 | Vaashi | Malayalam | |
| 2022 | Heaven | Malayalam | |
| 2022 | Mike | Malayalam | |
| 2022 | Jaya Jaya Jaya Jaya Hey | Malayalam | |
| 2022 | Saturday Night | Malayalam | |
| 2022 | Wonder Women | English | |
| 2022 | 777 Charlie | Kannada | |
| 2022 | Vikrant Rona | | |
| 2022 | Kantara | | |
| 2022 | Valimai | Tamil | |
| 2023 | Virupaksha | Telugu | |
| 2023 | Gandeevadhari Arjuna | Telugu | |
| 2023 | Tiger Nageswara Rao | Telugu | |
| 2023 | Salaar: Part 1 – Ceasefire | Telugu | |
| 2023 | Mangalavaaram | Telugu | |
| 2023 | Corona Papers | Malayalam | |
| 2023 | Romancham | Malayalam | |
| 2023 | King of Kotha | Malayalam | |
| 2023 | Garudan | Malayalam | |
| 2023 | Vela | Malayalam | |
| 2023 | Sesham Mike-il Fathima | Malayalam | |
| 2023 | Rani: The Real Story | Malayalam | |
| 2023 | Hostel Hudugaru Bekagiddare | Kannada | |
| 2023 | Sapta Saagaradaache Ello – Side A | Kannada | |
| 2023 | Sapta Saagaradaache Ello – Side B | Kannada | |
| 2023 | Por Thozhil | Tamil | |
| 2023 | DD Returns | Tamil | |
| 2023 | Irugapatru | Tamil | |
| 2023 | Parking | Tamil | |
| 2023 | Animal | Hindi | |
| 2024 | Bachelor Party | Kannada | |
| 2024 | Yuva | Kannada | |
| 2024 | Kotee | Kannada | |
| 2024 | Laughing Buddha | Kannada | |
| 2024 | Ibbani Tabbida Ileyali | Kannada | |
| 2024 | Murphy | Kannada | |
| 2024 | Bagheera | Kannada | |
| 2024 | Captain Miller | Tamil | |
| 2024 | Weapon | Tamil | |
| 2024 | Maharaja | Tamil | |
| 2024 | Black | Tamil | |
| 2024 | Iyer in Arabia | Malayalam | |
| 2024 | Bramayugam | Malayalam | |
| 2024 | Malayalee from India | Malayalam | |
| 2024 | Turbo | Malayalam | |
| 2024 | Grrr | Malayalam | |
| 2024 | Guruvayoor Ambalanadayil | Malayalam | |
| 2024 | Manorathagal | Malayalam | |
| 2024 | ARM | Malayalam | |
| 2024 | Murphy | Malayalam | |
| 2024 | Pani | Malayalam | |
| 2024 | Kalki 2898 AD | Telugu | |
| 2024 | Pottel | Telugu | |
| 2024 | Pushpa 2: The Rule | Telugu | |
| 2025 | L2: Empuraan | Malayalam | |
| 2025 | Test | Tamil | |
| 2025 | Love Under Construction | Malayalam | |
| 2025 | Thandel | Telugu | |
| 2025 | Vanangaan | Tamil | |
| 2025 | Machante Maalakha | Malayalam | |
| 2025 | Kantara: Chapter 1 | Kannada | |
| 2025 | Dragon | Tamil | |
| 2025 | Diés Iraé | Malayalam | |
| 2026 | Aashaan | Malayalam | |
| 2026 | Aroopi | Malayalam | |
| 2026 | Bouma | Malayalam | |
