= Amalda Liz =

Indian actress

- Born: Amalda Liz Joseph; Wayanad, Kerala, India
- Occupation: Actress
- Years active: 2016-present

Amalda Liz is an Indian film actress, who works in Malayalam films.

== Career ==
Amalda Liz started her career in 2016 with the film Kammatipaadam and later appeared in movies like C U Soon, Ottu and Sulaikha Manzil. She became known for her role in the 2024 film Bramayugam directed by Rahul Sadasivan.

== Filmography ==
Key
†	Denotes film or TV productions that have not yet been released

- All films are in Malayalam language unless otherwise noted.

Year	Title	Role(s)	Ref.
2016	Kammatipaadam	Rosamma	
2019	9	Divya	
2019	Under World	Annie	
2020	Trance	Sheeba	
2020	C U Soon	Sanjana	
2022	Ottu	Kichu's informer	
2023	Sulaikha Manzil	Bathool	
2024	Bramayugam	Yakshi	
