= AFSPA, 1958 =

Indian documentary film

- DVD cover
- Directed by: Haobam Paban Kumar
- Produced by: Bachaspatimayum Sunzu; Haobam Paban Kumar
- Release date: 2006
- Running time: 77 minutes
- Country: India
- Language: Manipuri

AFSPA, 1958 is a 2006 Manipuri documentary film directed by Haobam Paban Kumar in his directorial debut and produced by Bachaspatimayum Sunzu and Haobam. The film won the National Film Award for Best Non-Feature Film at the 56th National Film Awards.

== Synopsis ==
This documentary covers civil disobedience in Manipur against the Armed Forces Special Powers Act, 1958. It highlights the protests that followed the 2004 murder of Thangjam Manorama, where residents protested the broad powers given to security forces under AFSPA. One famous photograph from this time shows 30 middle-aged women marching naked through Imphal, the state capital, to the Assam Rifles headquarters

== Accolades ==
At the 10th Ismailia International Film Festival in Egypt, the film won three awards. It also received both the International Jury Prize and the FIPRESCI Prize at the Mumbai International Film Festival. Additionally, it was honored with the Swarna Kamal at the National Film Awards and was selected for screening at MoMA in New York.At the Indian Cine Film Festival (ICFF-07) in 2007 the film won the Best Documentary Award.

== Reception ==
Richard Kupers of Variety (magazine) noted "Though flawed by conventional documentary standards, AFSPA, 1958 has an undeniable fury. Comprised mostly of incendiary footage, Haobam Paban Kumar’s 77-minute documentary could be trimmed to an hour for broadcasters." In 2026, the film appeared in Firstpost’s list of five Manipuri films to watch.
