= Journey of Love 18+ =

2023 Malayalam film by Arun D. Jose

- Theatrical release poster
- Directed by: Arun D. Jose
- Screenplay by: Arun D. Jose; Raveesh Nath
- Story by: Rajesh Varikkoli
- Produced by: Anumod Bose; G. Prajith; Manoj P. K. Menon; Jini K. Gopinath
- Starring: Naslen; Mathew Thomas; Meenakshi Dinesh; Nikhila Vimal
- Cinematography: Satheesh Kurup
- Edited by: Chaman Chakko
- Music by: Christo Xavier
- Production companies: Falooda Entertainments; Reels Magic
- Distributed by: Icon Cinemas
- Release date: 7 July 2023
- Running time: 123 minutes
- Country: India
- Language: Malayalam

Journey of Love 18+ is a 2023 Indian Malayalam-language coming-of-age romantic comedy drama film directed by Arun D. Jose. The film stars Naslen, alongside Meenakshi Dinesh, Nikhila Vimal and Mathew Thomas. Set in North Malabar, the plot follows Akhil and Athira's affair and the situations they face after their elopement and marriage.

Principal photography commenced on 20 January 2023 in Vadakara. The film was released on 7 July 2023 and became an average hit at the box office.

== Plot ==
2009: Athira is the daughter of Raveendran, a political party's local secretary. She is in love with Akhil, a party worker. Athira calls Akhil one day and says she is ready to elope with him. Akhil discusses this with his close friends, Renju and Pattar. Renju suggests that they should meet Rajesh, a tipper driver who eloped and married.

Akhil, Renju, and Pattar go to Rajesh's house and ask for help. Rajesh initially refuses after learning Akhil's relationship is with the local secretary's daughter, but subsequently decides to help them. He advises that the wedding should be arranged in a temple in Taliparamba, which will cost some money. During a human chain formed by the local political party, a fully charged mobile phone battery is handed over to Athira by Pattar as per Rajesh's instruction. Akhil approaches his mother for money for the wedding, which she arranges through a bid.

A strike led by Athira's elder brother Arjun to the BSNL office turns violent, and the party declares a 24-hour hartal. Akhil and his friends meet Rajesh to talk about the preparations for the wedding, and Rajesh instructs them to make the necessary arrangements as quickly as possible. On the day of the hartal, Akhil and his friends organise the wedding saree, blouse, and thaali. At night, Akhil arrives at Athira's house without her family knowing and takes her along with Ranju and Pattar, who were waiting outside in a car.

The next day, Akhil and Athira get married in a temple in Taliparamba with Rajesh's help. Akhil's father tells him to stay away for a few days. Rajesh suggests to Akhil and his friends that they should move to Mookambika for two days. After checking into a hotel, Rajesh receives a call about the death of Athira's grandmother, and everyone decides to go to Athira's house. Raveendran beats Akhil and makes a scene after seeing his daughter with him. Rajesh helps Athira, Akhil, Renju, and Pattar escape. At Akhil's request, Rajesh takes them to Akhil's aunt's house in Kuttiady.

Upon a missing case being filed by Athira's family, police locate and present Akhil and Athira in court. Rajesh finds advocate Satish to plead for Akhil and Athira in court. Satish submits the photograph and the temple register as proof of marriage. However, Raveendran's lawyer proves that Athira is not 18 years old by producing her SSLC certificate. Satish checks the certificate and says that Athira will turn 18 in 5 days. Sony, the judicial magistrate, orders Athira to be taken to the children's home as she expresses her disinterest to return home.

Raveendran's lawyer reminds Arjun that once Athira reaches the age of 18, the court will allow them to live together, and Akhil should be stopped from reaching court. The police arrive at Akhil's house to arrest him in connection with a bus burning case. But Akhil's friend and party worker, Deepak, takes the blame for it.

Before the case is heard in court, Raveendran attempts to convince Athira to change her mind. Athira acts as if she agrees to everything. When the hearing of the case begins, Athira tells Sony that she wishes to go with Akhil and discloses her father's statement regarding Akhil's caste. As Athira has turned 18, the court accepts her decision to go with Akhil. Meanwhile, Akhil's younger brother plans to elope with his lover and marry once he turns 18.

== Cast ==
- Naslen as Akhil Dinesh
- Meenakshi Dinesh as Athira Raveendran
- Mathew Thomas as Deepak Madhavan
- Nikhila Vimal as Sony, Judicial Magistrate
- Binu Pappu as Rajesh
- Manoj K. U. as Raveendran, Athira's father
- Shyam Mohan as Arjun, Athira's brother
- Rajesh Madhavan as Advocate Satish
- Saaf as Renju, Akhil's friend
- Anshid Anu as Pattar, Akhil's friend
- Priya Sreejith as Shobha, Athira's mother
- Kumar Sunil as Dineshan, Akhil's father
- Nidhinya as Baby, Akhil's mother
- Babu Annur as Mohanan, party worker

== Production ==
=== Filming ===
Journey of Love 18+ is Arun D. Jose's second directorial after Jo and Jo. It also marks the reunion of Naslen, Mathew Thomas and Nikhila Vimal, who played the lead characters in Jo and Jo. The principal photography of the film began on 20 January 2023 in Vatakara.

== Soundtrack ==
Journey of Love 18+

Soundtrack album by Christo Xavier
- Genre: Feature film soundtrack
- Length: 15:26
- Language: Malayalam
- Label: Think Music India

Christo Xavier chronology
Madanolsavam (2023)	Journey of Love 18+ (2023)	Bramayugam (2024)

The music for the film was composed by Christo Xavier. The first song, "Maarante Pennalle", was released on 10 June 2023. The lyrical video titled "Kalyana Raavaane" was released on 30 June 2023.

Track listing
No.	Title	Lyrics	Singer(s)	Length
1.	"Maarante Pennalle"	Vaisakh Sugunan	Yogi Sekar	3:17
2.	"Kalyana Raavaane"	Suhail Koya	Muhammad Mubas, Yogi Sekar, Christo Xavier	3:15
3.	"Kaanal Kinaave"	Vinayak Sasikumar	Christo Xavier	4:39
4.	"Thee Veyilil"	Vaisakh Sugunan	Gowry Lekshmi	4:15
Total length:				15:26

== Release ==
=== Theatrical ===
The film was released in theatres on 7 July 2023.

=== Home media ===
SonyLIV obtained the film's digital rights and began streaming it on 15 September 2023.

=== Box office ===
The film grossed ₹2.5 crore (US$260,000) at the Kerala box office after four days of release. After ten days, the film grossed over ₹5 crore (US$520,000) worldwide, with Kerala box office accounting for nearly ₹4.1 crore (US$430,000).

== Reception ==
=== Critical reception ===
S. R. Praveen of The Hindu wrote "Director Arun D. Jose cannot muster up any chemistry between the lead pair, while the politics in the film is merely a prop except at a few points."

Princy Alexander of Onmanorama wrote "Overall, the film has a good, youthful vibe. However, it is not as free-flowing as its predecessors of the same genre, like Thanneer Mathan Dinangal, among others."

Subhash K. Jha of Times Now gave 3 out of 5 stars and wrote "For a film about a recycled Romeo & Juliet, Journey Of Love 18+ is a surprisingly reposeful film. A slap here and an abuse there, but otherwise the lovers face no major hurdles even during the climax when, traditionally, all hell should have broken loose."

A critic of The Times of India gave 3 out of 5 stars.

Raymond John Kuriachan of OTTPlay gave 3 out of 5 stars and wrote "Despite its familiar template, Naslen and Meenakshi's Journey of Love 18+ succeeds in becoming a light-hearted comedy."

Arjun Ramachandran of The South First gave 3 out of 5 stars and wrote "The Naslen and Meenakshi-starrer is vocal about political parties, their double standards, infightings, and caste politics."

Vignesh Madhu of Cinema Express gave 3.5 out of 5 stars and wrote "At a time when mediocre thrillers and vapid feel-good dramas are a dime a dozen in Malayalam cinema, such well-packaged fun films are indeed a breath of fresh air."
