= Sorgavaasal =

2024 Tamil film directed by Sidharth Vishwanath

- Theatrical release poster
- Directed by: Sidharth Vishwanath
- Screenplay by: Tamizh Prabha; Krishnakumar; Sidharth Vishwanath
- Story by: Tamizh Prabha; Krishnakumar; Sidharth Vishwanath Dheena Ravichandran
- Produced by: Siddharth Rao; Pallavi Singh
- Starring: RJ Balaji; Selvaraghavan; Sharaf U Dheen; Samuel Abiola Robinson; Hakim Shahjahan
- Cinematography: Prince Anderson
- Edited by: R. K. Selva
- Music by: Christo Xavier
- Production companies: Swipe Right Studios; Think Studios
- Distributed by: Dream Warrior Pictures
- Release date: 29 November 2024
- Running time: 135 minutes
- Country: India
- Language: Tamil

Sorgavaasal (transl. Gate of Heaven) is a 2024 Indian Tamil-language prison drama film directed by Siddharth Vishwanath in his debut, and produced by Swipe Right Studios, together with Think Studios. The screenplay and dialogues were written by Tamizh Prabha, Krishnakumar and Sidharth Vishwanath. The film stars RJ Balaji and Selvaraghavan, leading an ensemble cast that includes Karunas, Sharaf U Dheen, Samuel Abiola Robinson, Saniya Iyappan, Natty Subramaniam and Balaji Sakthivel. Based on the 1999 Madras Central Prison riots, the film revolves around a wrongfully convicted man thrown into prison and questioning whether such places really reform people. The film was released in theatres on 29 November 2024 and received mixed to positive reviews from critics.

== Plot ==
Following a prison riot at Madras Central Prison, Tamil Nadu Minister Mayilvaganam establishes an enquiry commission under retired Justice Ismail. The commission begins investigating the events leading up to the riot. Kattabomman, a prison employee with 30 years of service, initiates the narrative by recounting the story of Sigamani "Siga", a notorious gangster who, despite being incarcerated, controls the prison and the city through his wealth and influence. Tiger Mani, Siga's trusted aide, who struggles with anger issues, is also an inmate at the prison. Kendrick, a reformed man and former juvenile drug dealer, has embraced spirituality and now propagates the teachings of Jesus, earning the affection of his fellow inmates. Upon his urging and the advice of Seelan, an educated Sri Lankan Tamil refugee, Siga and his associates relinquish their sinful ways, accept Christianity, and Siga ultimately undergoes baptism.

Parthiban "Parthi", a new inmate, is falsely accused of murdering former IAS officer Shanmugam. Ismail, sensing a miscarriage of justice, investigates Parthi's fiancée, Revathy, who provides insight into Parthi's life. Parthi operates a roadside eatery with his mother and is romantically involved with Revathy, the owner of a nearby flower shop. Shanmugam, a regular customer at Parthi's eatery, becomes a family friend and offers to give Parthi a loan. However, when Parthi visits Shanmugam to collect the loan sanction letter, he is arrested and falsely accused of Shanmugam's murder by a police inspector who was harbouring a grudge against Parthi and frames him for the crime based solely on circumstantial evidence. When the inspector humiliates Parthi's mother, Parthi retaliates, providing additional evidence for the inspector to subsequently imprison him on murder charges and also falsely implicate Siga's alleged involvement in Shanmugam's murder. Inside the prison, Parthi begins to inquire about Siga. However, Siga's associates attack Parthi, and he is further brutally assaulted by Mani. Parthi fights back, enraging Siga's supporters, but Siga ultimately intervenes to stop the assault.

Kattabomman, who was expecting a promotion to jail superintendent but was overlooked in favour of Sunil Kumar, is appointed by the minister to counter Siga's influence. Upon confronting Siga, Sunil challenges him to curb the illicit activities, but Siga asserts that he has transformed. Once Mani is caught drug peddling, this leads to Siga's arrest and humiliation, and to Siga being undressed under the guise of frisking. Sunil, seeking to exploit Parthi against Siga, feigns benevolence and assigns Parthi to work in the prison kitchen under Bashir, where he befriends Rangu and Mohan. Once, Parthi discovers Rangu being sexually exploited for the benefit of VIP prisoners. Sunil confiscates Kendrick's Bible and brutally beats him, confining him to a dark cell. Kendrick eventually succumbs to fear, leading to his tragic demise in prison. Enraged by Kendrick's death, Siga violently assaults a policeman, but Seelan cautions Siga that Sunil's inhumane treatment must be exposed to the public on Christmas Day, when a reporter accompanied by church sisters visits the prison.

Days before Christmas, on 17 December, Sunil unofficially releases Parthi from prison, aiming to manipulate him into killing Siga. To gain Parthi's trust, Sunil arranges a meeting between Parthi and his mother. Sunil then deceives Parthi, suggesting that if Siga acknowledges that he did not hire Parthi to kill Shanmugam, Parthi will be released. Sunil manipulates him into mixing laxative powder in Siga's food, but Parthi assumes it to be poison. Following Kendrick's funeral, Siga and his associates become intoxicated. Parthi refrains from offering Siga the adulterated food; however, Mani, unaware of the adulteration, gives it to Siga. Before consuming the food, Siga confesses to Parthi that he had no involvement in Shanmugam's murder. Under the minister's instructions, Sunil transports Siga to Vellore prison. Unbeknownst to Sunil, Siga had consumed the adulterated food and died en route. Realizing the food is being poisoned, Sunil orders Kattabomman to take Siga's corpse to the government hospital for autopsy, where it is discovered that an additional toxic substance was present in his system. On 20 December, the day of Parthi's bail hearing, the news of Siga's death spreads throughout the prison, sparking a violent uprising among the inmates, who attack the police and break free from their cells. Mani assumes control of the prison, while Siga's rival gang vows to eliminate him.

Seelan and Mani plan to use the situation to demand better treatment, including Sunil's arrest and the release of investigation prisoners. However, Sunil refuses to comply. In retaliation, the inmates take three MLAs, who were being held as VIP prisoners, hostage. This development spreads to the public. Mani suspects Parthi of involvement in Siga's murder and confronts him. However, Bashir intervenes and rescues Parthi. Ismail's inquiry with Dr. Ravichandran reveals that Mani, in a fit of rage, coerced Parthi into mutilating one of the VIP prisoners to intimidate the government and further attests that the powder he provided to Parthi was not poisonous.

Meanwhile, the prison, now under the control of the DIG, informs that the government has accepted only two of the demands to establish an inquiry commission and suspend Sunil. Mani, enraged that Siga's murderers may go unpunished, becomes increasingly aggressive, leaving Parthi fearful of being caught. Mani's behaviour creates a rift between him and Seelan. Mani, allying with Siga's rival gang, locks up the other inmates. Parthi, determined to rescue the three captive MLAs, embarks on a solo mission to free them, enabling the other prisoners to negotiate with the government and secure their release. Meanwhile, Mohan, a drug addict, informs Mani that Parthi possesses a powder that has been causing him stomach problems. Believing that Parthi was responsible for Siga's death, Mani orders his men to find and kill Parthi.

As the truth unravels, Parthi tells Sunil through a walkie-talkie that he did not mix the powder in Siga's food as instructed. Sunil promises to release Parthi in exchange for information about the three captive MLAs. Sunil and his team launch a shootout in the prison, where Bashir is fatally shot. With his dying breath, he accuses Parthi of betrayal. Mani engages in a fierce battle with Parthi, but the other inmates intervene. Finally, Sunil confronts Mani. Kattabomman informs Ismail that upon entering the prison after an hour, he found most inmates dead. However, it is revealed that Kattabomman, along with his team, had shot and killed the inmates, including Seelan and others who were awaiting peace talks. Furthermore, Kattabomman had given Siga the poisoned halwa through Mohan and subsequently shot him dead. The inmates confront Sunil about Bashir's death, but when he begins to reveal the truth about Siga's poisoning, Parthi kills him to silence him.

Both Kattabomman and Parthi falsely accuse Mani of killing Sunil. Parthi astutely replies to Ismail that just as Shanmugam's murderers remain unknown, so too will Sunil's killers. Ismail concludes the investigation, closing the case with lingering doubts, such as one of the MLAs who was imprisoned during the riot is now the Home Minister, who had ordered the probe. Parthi's family, who once struggled to make ends meet with their small eatery, now owns a thriving restaurant. Kattabomman has been promoted to Superintendent of the prison. Ismail remains convinced of Parthi's innocence but is perplexed by his willingness to accept responsibility for the events that happened in the prison. Kattabomman and Parthi, aware of each other's secrets, exchange a silent, knowing glance.

The film concludes with Parthi, now a seemingly powerful person in the prison, gazing at his engagement photograph. Ismail reflects on Kattabomman's ominous words: "There are only two paths in life: either kneel down in Heaven or be the King in Hell."

== Cast ==
- RJ Balaji as Parthiban "Parthi" M.
- Selvaraghavan as Sigamani "Siga"
- Sharaf U Dheen as SP D. Sunil Kumar IPS
- Hakim Shahjahan as Tiger Mani
- Samuel Abiola Robinson as Kendrick
- Natty Subramaniam as Ismail
- Saniya Iyappan as Revathy
- Balaji Sakthivel as Bashir (Cook)
- Ravi Raghavendra as Mohan
- Param
- Santhana Bharathi as Minister
- Antonythasan Jesuthasan as Seelan
- Renga Prasanth as Prabha
- Maurish Dass as Rangu
- Kaka Gopal as Anand, Parthi's eatery worker
- Porkodi Senthil as Parthi's mother
- Aravind Janakiraman as Dr. Ravichandran
- Jayamani as Tamil Nadu Home Minister
- Gnana Prasad as Dhana

== Production ==
After Run Baby Run (2023), while shooting for Singapore Saloon (2024) with Gokul, actor RJ Balaji was reported to have signed his next project titled Sorgavaasal with a debutant director Sidharth Vishwanath, a former assistant director of Pa. Ranjith. The story of the film is co-written by Sidharth along with Thamizh Praba and Ashwin Ravichandran. The film is produced by Siddharth Raviputi and Pallavi Singh of Think Studios and Swipe Right Studios. The technical crew includes Prince Anderson as the cinematographer, Selva RK as the editor and S Jayachandran as the art director. In mid-March 2023, it was reported that the principal photography had already begun and completed around 37 days shoot in Karnataka.

== Music ==
Sorgavaasal

Soundtrack album by Christo Xavier
- Released: 29 November 2024
- Genre: Feature film soundtrack
- Length: 15:56
- Language: Tamil
- Label: Think Music
- Producer: Christo Xavier

Christo Xavier chronology
Sookshmadarshini (2024)	Sorgavaasal (2024)	Diés Iraé (2025)

Singles from Sorgavaasal
- 1. "The End" Released: 27 November 2024

Jukebox
- Sorgavaasal – Audio Jukebox on YouTube

The background and soundtrack is composed by Christo Xavier in his Tamil debut. The first single "The End" sung by Anirudh Ravichander with the English lyrics written by Clint Lewis and Tamil lyrics by Arun Srinivasan was released on 27 November 2024. The audio jukebox was released by Think Music on 29 November 2024.

Track listing
No.	Title	Lyrics	Singer(s)	Length
1.	"Kaalam Thannaley"	Nixy	Sean Roldan	3:19
2.	"The End"	Clint Lewis, Arun Srinivasan	Anirudh Ravichander	4:03
3.	"Sorgavaasal"	Nixy	Lal Krishna	1:29

Background Score
No.	Title	Singer(s)	Length
1.	"Wings of Freedom" (Instrumental)	–	2:00
2.	"Priest and the Pupil"	Karunas	1:36
3.	"The Walls of Sorgavaasal" (Instrumental)	–	3:16

== Marketing ==
On 19 October 2024, the title-reveal first look poster was released featuring the lead actor with a slate in his hand with his number in Madras Central Prison in the year 1999. The title of the film Sorgavaasal is a callback to the 1954 film by the same name written by the former Chief Minister of Tamil Nadu C. N. Annadurai. Two days later on 21 October, the film's teaser was released featuring some the lead actors with a brief introduction of their roles was released, with the voice-over given by Karunas mentioning the New Testament verse Matthew 5:4. Lokesh Kanagaraj, who unveiled the film's trailer alongside Anirudh Ravichander, modified the script of his directorial film Kaithi 2 after watching Sorgavaasal in a special screening since his film also had many jail sequences.

== Release ==
=== Theatrical ===
Sorgavaasal was theatrically released on 29 November 2024.

=== Distribution ===
The distribution rights to Sorgavaasal in Tamil Nadu are held by Dream Warrior Pictures, and in Karnataka by KVN Productions.

=== Home media ===
On 16 January 2024, Netflix announced that they had acquired the post-theatrical streaming rights of Sorgavaasal along with a list of 8 other films. The film began streaming there from 27 December 2024.

== Reception ==
Sorgavaasal received mixed to positive reviews from critics.

Abhinav Subramaniam of The Times of India gave 3.5/5 stars and wrote "Sorgavaasal works as it isn't trying to make grand statements but instead, focuses on its characters caught in a place they can't escape. Like Parthi's food stall, the film serves up familiar ingredients while creating its own flavor." Kirubhakar Purushothaman of News18 gave 3.5/5 stars and wrote "All characters have a clear motive and an arc that is effectively realised. Which is aided by commendable performances from RJ Balaji, Karunas, and almost all of the lead cast, which makes Sorgavaasal a gripping watch." Avinash Ramachandran of The Indian Express gave 3/5 stars and wrote "In this Virumaandi (2004) meets Vada Chennai (2018) narrative, it is the characters and their effective portrayal that ensures the film doesn't crash and burn in the tepid final act."

Janani K of India Today gave 2.5/5 stars and wrote "Sorgavaasal feels like a blend of Virumaandi and Vada Chennai. But, it fails to achieve the magic that both of the films did. Nevertheless, the film is a decent attempt to showcase the 1999 riots that killed many prisoners and police officers." Prashanth Vallavan of Cinema Express gave 2.5/5 stars and wrote "Sorgavaasal is only frustrating because we get a glimpse of what it could have been: A compelling prison drama. Instead, it becomes an effective collection of thematically rich moments, sporadically impressive performances, and an almost satisfying film." Vishal Menon of The Hollywood Reporter India noted the film's similarities to Virumaandi, adding that "instead of the docu-drama feel that was employed" in that film, "Sidharth has chosen to rely on strong performances and the writing to keep [Sorgavaasal] accessible and mainstream".

Anusha Sundar of OTTPlay gave the film 2.5/5 stars and wrote "Given the film borrowed from reality and had immense room for fictional play, Sorgavaasal becomes an underwhelming watch even with sporadic stretches of interesting niches." Bhuvanesh Chandar of The Hindu wrote "In the end, Sorgavaasal does not feel like a cohesive screenplay with a few flourishing scenes; you only see the potential, of what it could have been with a tighter storyline and some breathing space for the characters of this claustrophobic prison." Latha Srinivasan of Hindustan Times wrote "Sorgavaasal is a strong debut for Sidharth Vishwanath, whose talent is evident, but unfortunately, an underwhelming film." Khalilullah of Hindu Tamil Thisai reviewed the film more positively, praising the music, cinematography and editing, although the critic felt Saniya Iyappan was underutilised, and the ending was dragged.
