= Shehnad Jalal =

Indian cinemotographer

- Born: Thiruvananthapuram, Kerala, India
- Education: Satyajit Ray Film and Television Institute
- Occupation: Cinematographer
- Years active: 2006- present
- Parents: A Jalaludeen (father); Jahanara Jalal (mother)

Shehnad Jalal is a cinematographer based in Kerala, India. He made his debut as a Cinematographer in the film Chitrasutram. The film won him the Kerala State Film Award for Best Cinematography in the year 2010. Best Cinematography Award at the 72nd National Film Awards in 2025.

The documentary, A Pestering Journey won him the Navaroze Contractor Award for the Best Documentary Cameraman at the 4th International Documentary and Short Film Festival of Kerala, 2011., He won a nomination for Achievement in Cinematography at the Asia Pacific Screen Awards 2017, for his work in the movie Loktak Lairembee (film) (Lady of the Lake) in the Meitei language, directed by Haobam Paban Kumar. The film won the Golden Gateway award for Best Film at the Mumbai International Film Festival 2016 and the National Award for the Best Indian Film on Environment Conservation, 2016. Shehnad Jalal is a member of the Indian Society of Cinematographers (ISC).

== Accolades ==
Year	Award	Category	Recipient	Result	Notes	Ref.
2010	Kerala State Film Awards	Best Cinematography	Chitrasutram	Won	Shared with M. J. Radhakrishnan	
2011	4th International Documentary and Short Film Festival of Kerala	Best Documentary Cameraman	A Pestering Journey	Won		
2017	Asia Pacific Screen Awards	Best Cinematographer	Loktak Lairembee	Nominated		
2023	SIIMA Awards	Best Cinematographer	Bramayugam	Won		

== Filmography ==
=== Feature films ===
- All films are in Malayalam, unless mentioned otherwise.

Year	Title	Director	Notes
2010	Chitrasutram	Vipin Vijay	Debut
2012	Ee Adutha Kaalathu	Arun Kumar Aravind	
2013	Chennaiyil Oru Naal	Shaheed Kader	Tamil film; Debut in Tamil cinema
2013	Left Right Left	Arun Kumar Aravind	
2013	Kanyaka Talkies	K. R. Manoj	
2013	Vedivazhipadu	Shambhu Purushothaman	
2013	Vishudhan	Vysakh	
2015	Nirnayakam	V. K. Prakash	
2016	Loktak Lairembee	Haobam Paban Kumar	
2016	Kavi Uddheshichathu..?	Thomas Kutty & Liju Thomas	
2016	Velutha Rathrikal	Razi Muhammed	
2017	Irattajeevitham	Suresh Narayanan	
2017	Vimaanam	Pradeep M. Nair	
2019	Sathyam Paranja Viswasikkuvo	G. Prajith	
2019	Kamala	Ranjith Sankar	
2022	Bhoothakaalam	Rahul Sadasivan	
2023	Madanolsavam	Sudheesh Gopinath	
2024	Bramayugam	Rahul Sadasivan	National Film Award for Best Cinematography
2024	Ullozhukku	Christo Tomy	
2025	Paathirathri	Ratheena PT	
2025	Diés Iraé	Rahul Sadasivan	
2026	Padayaatra †	Adoor Gopalakrishnan	

=== Documentaries ===
Year	Film	Director	Language
2023	Curry & Cyanide: The Jolly Joseph Case	Christo Tomy	English Netflix Original
2017	Work of fire	K R Manoj	Malayalam
2016	Kesari	K R Manoj	Malayalam
2015	Maruvili – Call from the other shore	Anwar Ali	Malayalam
2015	Amma	Neelan	Malayalam
2014	adutha bellodu koodi jeevitham arambhikkum	Manilal	Malayalam
2013	On the trail of a rain song	Usha Zacharias	English
2010	A Pestering Journey	KR Manoj	Malayalam
2007	16mm-Memories, Movement and a Machine	KR Manoj	Malayalam

=== Short films ===
Year	Film	Director	Language
2010	The way she is venerated in love	Manilal	Malayalam
2009	Charulatha-the tale untold	Sangeetha Padmanabhan	Malayalam
2009	French Revolution	Manu	Malayalam
2006	Ngaihak Lambida (English: Along The Way)	Haobam Paban Kumar	Meiteilon

=== Music video ===
Year	Film	Director	Language
2016	Funeral of a native sons	Muhsin Parari	Malayalam
