= Nine Hills One Valley =

- Poster
- Directed by: Haobam Paban Kumar
- Screenplay by: Haobam Paban Kumar; Sankha
- Story by: Haobam Paban Kumar
- Produced by: Warepam Jhansirani; Haobam Paban Kumar
- Starring: Anam Ahum
- Cinematography: Irom Maipak; Ranjan Palit
- Edited by: Sankha
- Music by: Sukanta Majumdar
- Production company: Oli Pictures
- Distributed by: Oli Pictures
- Release date: January 2021 (Film Bazaar)
- Running time: 75 minutes
- Country: India
- Languages: Manipuri & Tangkhul

Nine Hills One Valley is a 2021 Indian Manipuri-Tangkhul bilingual film conceptualized and directed by Haobam Paban Kumar. It is produced by Warepam Jhansirani and Haobam Paban Kumar for Oli Pictures. The movie was among 19 feature films selected for Film Bazaar Recommends (FBR) section of the Film Bazaar 2020. It was premiered at the 16th Jogja-NETPAC Asian Film Festival 2021, Indonesia. The film was certified by Central Board of Film Certification (CBFC) in 2020.

Nine Hills One Valley has been selected for many international film festivals in India and abroad, which include 16th Jogja-NETPAC Asian Film Festival 2021, Indonesia, 5th Ottawa Indian Film Festival Awards (OIFFA) 2022, Canada, 27th Kolkata International Film Festival 2022 (Asian Select Category), 22nd Jio MAMI Mumbai Film Festival 2022 (India Gold section), 1st International Tribal Film Festival (ITFF) 2022, Arunachal Pradesh, 1st Eikhoigi Imphal International Film Festival 2022, Manipur, 13th Indian Film Festival of Melbourne 2022, 44th Moscow International Festival 2022, 13th Annual Chicago South Asian Film Festival 2022, 15th International Film Festival East & West 2022, Orenburg, Russia, 12th Indian Film Festival of Bhubaneswar 2023.

== Plot ==
The film centres around Ahum, a tribal from the hills who is going to Imphal city in the valley to meet his daughter. She is to leave for New Delhi in search of a job. During the course of the journey, he encounters different people and their stories, gradually exposing the cruelty of ethnic conflicts.

== Cast ==
- Shang Anam Ahum
- Thanreingam Ngalung
- Lakreiphi Ahum
- Tennoson Pheiray
- Agui Kamei
- Aimol Villagers
- Kharampu
- Makhan Villagers
- Borun Thokchom
- Shananda Phurailatpam
- Chongtham Belmond
- Pao Neo Mate
- Haobam Paban Kumar
- Laishram Devakumar
- Veinen Lhungdim

== Accolades ==
Nine Hills One Valley received Special Mention Award in the Film Bazaar Recommends Section of the Film Bazaar 2020 held in January 2021. The citation for the award reads, "A jury special mention goes to a film that aptly blurs the boundaries between fiction and documentary to embark on a journey through a landscape of many identities and conflicts. Through the journey of its protagonist and through the language of cinema, the director gives word to the unspoken and searches for a space of reconciliation. The special mention goes to Nine Hills One Valley by Haobam Paban Kumar".

The film won 2 awards at the 14th Manipur State Film Awards 2022.

Award	Category	Winner's name	Result	Ref.
Film Bazaar 2020	Special Mention	Haobam Paban Kumar	Won	
14th Manipur State Film Awards 2022	Best Audiography (Location sound recordist for sync sound films only)	Laishram Devakumar Meitei	Won	
14th Manipur State Film Awards 2022	Special Jury Award	Haobam Paban Kumar	Won	
FIPRESCI India Grand Prix 2021	2nd Spot in Top 10	Haobam Paban Kumar	Won	
