= Bhoothakaalam =

2022 Indian Malayalam horror film

- Promotional poster
- Directed by: Rahul Sadasivan
- Screenplay by: Rahul Sadasivan; Sreekumar Shreyas
- Story by: Rahul Sadasivan
- Produced by: Teresa Rani; Sunila Habeeb
- Starring: Shane Nigam; Revathi; Saiju Kurup; James Eliya; Athira Patel
- Cinematography: Shehnad Jalal
- Edited by: Shafique Mohamed Ali
- Music by: Songs: Shane Nigam; Background Score: Gopi Sundar
- Production companies: Plan T Films; Shane Nigam Films
- Distributed by: SonyLIV
- Release date: 21 January 2022
- Running time: 105 minutes
- Country: India
- Language: Malayalam

Bhoothakaalam (transl. Past) is a 2022 Indian Malayalam-language psychological horror film written and directed by Rahul Sadasivan, starring Shane Nigam and Revathy. The film was produced by Anwar Rasheed under the banner Plan T Films in association with Shane Nigam Films. Gopi Sunder handled the background score while Shane Nigam made his debut as a music director as well as producer. The film received critical acclaim for its atmosphere, sound design, and performances, with Revathy winning the Kerala State Film Award for Best Actress for her role.

== Plot ==
Asha lives with her son Vinu in a rented house, where she takes care of her ailing mother, who later dies. Asha is a school teacher and manages the household finances single-handedly. Vinu has completed his D.Pharm. and has been searching for a job for almost two years, but in vain. Unable to endure the struggle of unemployment, Vinu resumes his smoking and drinking habits. Asha is depressed and on medication, and is frustrated that Vinu cannot find a job in the same city.

Vinu begins to witness strange occurrences in the house, as though there were another entity present. Initially, he assumes that it is his mother trying to show her anger towards him, but he is later convinced that someone else is indeed there. Just like his friends and relatives, Vinu's mother also thinks that something is wrong with him and, at the behest of her brother, after a drunken brawl, she takes him to a mental health counsellor, George. Vinu, however, does not cooperate with George. While Asha begins to realise that Vinu's belief that someone else is present in the house is true, George learns from the neighbour about the mass deaths that had occurred in the house in the past, and investigates further to learn that the owner's son, who had been staying there years earlier, killed his wife and daughter and hanged himself for unknown reasons, while another bank manager tenant narrowly escaped death, although he was left paralysed during his stay. He also finds that both tenants had been suffering from emotional setbacks for different reasons at the time, and had been behaving irrationally while staying in the house.

Vinu tries to confide in his girlfriend about the happenings, but she does not understand. Vinu's uncle concludes that he is insane and must be admitted to a psychiatric hospital. That very night, Asha tries to poison herself and Vinu at dinner, but throws away the poisoned food when she and her son speak, understand each other, and decide to reconcile. Soon afterwards, the ghosts in the house make their presence known and terrify the two, who manage to escape.

In the end, Asha and Vinu, now reconciled, are shown vacating the house the very next day with the help of the uncle and George.

== Cast ==
- Revathi as Asha
- Shane Nigam as Vinu
- Saiju Kurup as George
- James Eliya as Madhu
- Athira Patel as Priya
- Valsala Menon as Vinu's grandmother
- Abhiram Radhakrishnan as Shyam
- Gilu Joseph as Dr Beena
- Manju Sunichen as Asha's neighbour
- Sneha Sreekumar as Vice Principal

== Music ==
Gopi Sundar did the background score for the film. The sole song from the film was written, composed and sung by Shane Nigam.

Song	Singer	Lyricist	Ref.
Raa Tharame	Shane Nigam	Shane Nigam	

== Sound Department ==
Vignesh Radhakrishnan and Kishan Mohan did the sound design and Rahool Syam did the production sound mix. Mix and mastering was done at Sapthaa Records, Ernakulam.

== Themes and analysis ==
Bhoothakaalam has been discussed as a psychological horror film in which the supernatural serves as a metaphor for grief, trauma and clinical depression. In a review for News9Live, the film was described as an allegory for mental illness that links psychological disorder to fear-inducing imagery and portrays characters affected by depression and substance abuse. The house shared by the mother, Asha, and her son, Vinu, is presented as a reflection of their state of mind: Asha is reluctant to take her antidepressants, and Vinu uses alcohol and drugs to cope with depression and sleeplessness. As the two begin to experience apparent paranormal events, the review reads their fear as a depiction of psychosis, an overwhelming state that distorts their perception of reality.

Writing in The Indian Express, a critic highlighted the film's slow narrative as a means of building atmosphere and dread while introducing a mystery element and shifting between psychological and supernatural perspectives. The same review identified isolation and emotional longing as central concerns, arguing that tying these feelings to the main characters gives the film a personal resonance.

== Reception ==
B Rohan Naahar from The Indian Express stated: "Bhoothakaalam has one of the most thrillingly staged conclusions to any horror film in recent memory." The Hindu wrote: "Bhoothakaalam shows us how to get the scares right, in quite an understated, effortless fashion." calling it a "a textbook in how to scare the audience with minimal use of jump scare techniques." Sajin Srijith of The New Indian Express gave 4/5 stars and described Bhoothakaalam as a "Gimmick-free, supremely effective horror flick."

Writing for Hindustan Times, Devarsi Ghosh wrote that the film is a "moving mental health drama disguised as horror," praising the writing, acting and direction." Deepa Soman of The Times of India gave 3 out of 5 and wrote: "Though it's all staple horror film elements, thanks to the performance of the lead actors – one stays enticed till the last moment of the film to see how things turn out for the family in distress." Anna M. M. Vetticad of Firstpost gave the film 4 out of 5 stars praising the story, direction, performance, cinematography. She mentioned "mental health, the pressure of elder care, alcoholism, drug abuse, a flawed education system, unemployment."

Saibal Chatterjee of NDTV gave 3.5 out of 5 stars and wrote, the film is "fleshed out with commendable control by Revathi and Shane Nigam" as they "confront a rapid unravelling of their lives in a house where a dark secret lurks in the shadows." Sowmya Rajendran of The News Minute stated, the film became " one of the scariest horror films to come out in recent times."

Sanjith Sidhardhan from OTTplay gave 3.5 /5 stars and called performances of lead cast "powerful," while appreciating "eerie atmosphere in which most of the story evolves." Manoj Kumar R from The Indian Express gave 3.5 out of 5 and wrote, "Shane Nigam is impressive as the man staring into the abyss while Revathi channels the pain of a torment soul. Together, they draw us by the collar and retain the hold till the very end." Cris from The News Minute gave 3.5 out of 5 and stated, "Bhoothakaalam is a well-prepared movie, scripted carefully and made richer by beautiful performances."

Filmmaker Ram Gopal Varma tweeted that he hasn't seen a more realistic horror film than Bhoothakaalam since William Friedkin's The Exorcist (1973).

Film critic Anna M. M. Vetticad ranked it second in her year-end list of best Malayalam films.

== Accolades ==
Year	Award	Category	Recipient	Result	Ref.
2022	Kerala State Film Awards	Best Actress	Revathi	Won	
2022	Critics Best Actress	Best Actress – Malayalam	Revathi	Won	

== See also ==
- Bramayugam
- Diés Iraé
