= Urumi (film) =

2011 Indian film by Santosh Sivan

- Theatrical release poster
- Directed by: Santosh Sivan
- Written by: Shankar Ramakrishnan
- Produced by: Shaji Nadesan; Santosh Sivan; Prithviraj Sukumaran
- Starring: Prithviraj Sukumaran; Prabhu Deva; Arya; Genelia D'Souza; Nithya Menen; Vidya Balan; Jagathy Sreekumar
- Narrated by: KPAC Lalitha
- Cinematography: Santosh Sivan
- Edited by: A. Sreekar Prasad
- Music by: Deepak Dev
- Production company: August Cinema
- Distributed by: Reliance Entertainment
- Release date: 31 March 2011 (India)
- Running time: 172 minutes
- Country: India
- Language: Malayalam
- Budget: ₹20 crore

Urumi (also known as Urumi: The Warriors Who Wanted to Kill Vasco Da Gama) is a 2011 Indian Malayalam-language epic historical drama film written by Shankar Ramakrishnan. It was directed and co-produced by Santosh Sivan. It features an ensemble cast including Prithviraj Sukumaran, Arya, Prabhu Deva, Genelia D'Souza, Nithya Menon, Vidya Balan, Jagathy Sreekumar, Alex O'Nell, Sasi Kallinga and Tabu. The film marks the debut of both Prabhu Deva and Genelia D'Souza in Malayalam cinema.

The film is set in the early 16th century, when the Portuguese ruled over large parts of the Indian Ocean. The story follows Murukkancheri Kelu (Prithviraj), who seeks to avenge the killing of his father by Portuguese colonizers, and his companions Vavvali of Nagapattinam (Prabhu Deva), Princess Ayesha of Arackel (Genelia D'Souza) and Princess Bala of Chirakkal (Nithya Menon). The plot incorporates the intrigues of the Chirakkal royal family, in which Kelu serves as commander-in-chief, its rivalry with the house of Arackal, and the assassination of Prince Bhanu Vikraman (Ankur Khanna). The plot also incorporates historical figures such as Estêvão da Gama (Alexx O'Nell), Vasco da Gama (Alexx O'Nell and Robin Pratt) and Chenichery Kurup (Jagathy Sreekumar).

The film's budget was more than ₹200 million, making it the second-most expensive Malayalam film at the time, after Gokulam Gopalan's Pazhassi Raja (2009). It also marked the debut of Prithviraj Sukumaran as a producer. Urumi was released in Hindi as Ek Yodha Shoorveer and Tamil as Urumi: Padhinaintham Nootrandu Uraivaal. It was dubbed in Telugu with the same title, Urumi.

The film was critically acclaimed. It won two Kerala State Film Awards for Best Background Music (Deepak Dev) and Best Sound Recordist (M. R. Rajakrishnan). It also won the Best film and Best Director in Imagine India Film Festival in Barcelona. It was also the opening film of the Panorama Section in Goa Film Festival. Urumi is widely regarded as one of the defining movies of the Malayalam New Wave.

== Plot ==
The executives of the multinational mining corporation Nirvana Group inform Goa-based Krishna Das that his ancestral property in North Kerala, which was leased to a non-governmental organisation (NGO) by his late grandfather, is rich in minerals and can be sold because the lease period has expired. Nirvana Group offers him a large sum of money as an advance on the purchase. The NGO currently runs a tribal school on the property, which is situated within the Kannadi Forest Range. When Krishna Das and his friend Thanseer visit the property, they are kidnapped by tribal men and taken to a cave deep in the forest. There, Krishna Das meets the tribal chief, Thankachan, who explains that Krishna Das is a descendant of a certain Chirakkal Kelu Nayanar.

In the early 16th century, Portuguese sailors under Vasco da Gama capture a Muslim pilgrim ship and take all the passengers as prisoners. The general of The Chirakkal kingdom (northern Kerala), the Kothuwal, sends a Brahmin negotiator and his own son, Kelu (as per the customs of the land), to the captured ship to negotiate the prisoners' release. However, Vasco da Gama rejects their attempt at negotiation, cutting off the negotiator's ears. He then orders that the prisoners be locked in the hold and the ship set on fire. Kothuwal storms into the burning ship to rescue his son, Kelu. Although Kelu escapes, Chirakkal Kothuwal is killed during a fight that ensues. Vavvali, a Tamil Muslim boy, takes the orphaned Kelu with him to his home and treats him as his brother. Kelu crafts an urumi from the leftover ornaments of the dead women and children of the pilgrim ship. He takes an oath to kill Vasco da Gama one day.

Many years later, Kelu and Vavvali are hunting in a forest somewhere in Chirakkal. During their hunt, they rescue the princess of Chirakkal, Bala, from a group of abductors armed with Portuguese pistols, who apparently have been sent by her cousin, Bhanu Vikraman. Under the orders of Bhanu Vikraman, Kelu and Vavvali are captured by the Chirakkal guards at Puthoor Ferry and tried before the king of Chirakkal. During the trial, Bala reveals that the two young men in fact saved her life from the goons. Chenichery Kurup, the king's minister, convinces the king that the abductors might be from the Arakkal kingdom.

The king grants Kelu and Vavvali an audience. During the conversation, Kelu learns that Vasco da Gama is scheduled to return to India as Viceroy. They plan to infiltrate Fort Arakkal and capture Gama during the execution of the "pirate" Balia Hassan. Instead, they capture Estêvão da Gama and bring him to Chirakkal as a prisoner. In the process, Kelu and Vavvali encounter and are aided by Ayesha, a fiery warrior princess of the Arakkal palace. With Ayesha's help, Balia Hassan is freed from the gallows, and chaos ensues.

Unbeknownst to Kelu and Vavvali, a group of Chirakkal warriors simultaneously raids the Arakkal palace, assassinates Harabichi Beevi, and takes a large number of women from the palace as prisoners. Back in Chirakkal, the king bestows upon Kelu the honor of becoming the new general ("Kothuval"). Vavvali, however, is somewhat unhappy that the king fails to acknowledge his role in the capture of Estêvão. Princess Ayesha, among the captives taken during the raid on Arakkal, is presented to the spoiled prince Bhanu Vikraman as a concubine. She attempts to kill the prince in his chamber, but Kelu saves him.

In Cochin, Vasco da Gama is enraged upon learning of the capture and mutilation of his son Estêvão. Later, Kelu helps Ayesha escape from Chirakkal and asks her to flee from "this cursed land". With the help of Kelu and Vavvali, Ayesha manages to rescue all the women imprisoned in Chirakkal and smuggle them to a secret cave in Puthur.

With princess Ayesha, Kelu and Vavvali set out to the villages in the kingdom and succeed in garnering support from the common folk against the Portuguese. A large number of people join with Kelu and Ayesha to form a resistance. Kelu also induces the king of Chirakkal to seek assistance from the Syrian Christians in Kodungallur. Meanwhile, with the help of minister Kurup, Bhanu Vikraman conspires against his uncle and joins forces with Estêvão da Gama. Bhanu Vikraman assassinates his uncle with a Portuguese pistol. Kelu returns to Chirakkal palace to discuss with Vikraman, now king of Chirakkal, what actions to take against da Gama, but Bhanu hesitantly states that the army will no longer take orders from Kelu. Chirakkal Bala, the princess of Chirakkal, now joins with Kelu and his cohorts. Meanwhile, da Gama, accompanied by Estêvão da Gama among others, arrives at the Chirakkal palace. Chenichery Kurup, whom da Gama remembers, at first sight, welcomes him. During the audience, Bhanu Vikraman is killed by Estêvão da Gama. As a mark of respect for his allegiance to the Portuguese crown, the empire offers Kurup the post of the Governor General of the Laccadives.

The Chirakkal army, led by Angadan Nambi, attacks the rebel hideout. The rebels, led by Kelu, Vavvali, Ayesha, and the defected Chirakkal general Kaimal, fight back. Soon, a Portuguese unit led by Estêvão da Gama arrives in the village as reinforcement for the Chirakkal forces. The rebels manage to defeat the combined forces, but Vavvali is killed in action.

The rebels then launch an attack on the Chirakkal palace, and a fierce battle ensues. They are immediately put on the defensive by Portuguese cannons. Kelu manages to breach the perimeter established by Estêvão and enters the palace. He attacks da Gama but is killed by musketeers.

After hearing the moving story of his ancestors, Krishna Das decides not to sell his land to the multinational mining corporation and instead chooses to start a new life in Kerala.

== Cast ==
- Prithviraj Sukumaran – Chirakkal Kelu Nayanar (Past); Krishna Das aka K. D. (Present)
  - Dhananjay - young Kelu
- Arya – Chirakkal Kothuwal (Past); Thankachan (Present)
- Prabhu Deva – Nagapattinam Vavvali (Past); Thanseer aka Tarzan (Present)
  - Aadhil - young Vavvali
- Genelia D'Souza – Arackal Ayesha (Past); Urmila (Present)
- Nithya Menen – Chirakkal Bala (Past); Daisy da Cunha, head of the Real Estate Division, Nirvana (Present)
- Vidya Balan – Makkom (Past); Bhumika (Present) (cameo appearance)
- Alexx O'Nell – young Vasco Da Gama, Estêvão da Gama (Past); John Thomas, executive of Nirvana (Present)
  - Robin Pratt – old Vasco Da Gama
- Amole Gupte – king of Chirakkal
- Ankur Khanna – Bhanu Vikraman of Chirakkal
- Jagathy Sreekumar – Chenichery Kurup (Past); Kerala Minister (Present)
- Shaji Nadesan – MLA Raveendra Kaimal (Present); Kaimal (Past)
- Sasi Kalinga – Arakkal Hasim (Azim) Marakkar (Past); Advocate Hashim (Present)
- Kani Kusruti – the bard in Chirakkal court
- Deepak Jethi – Balia Hassan
- Tanusree Kausal – Arakkal Beevi
- Sheela – Vavvali's mother
- Aju – Mangadan Nambi
- Sreekala Sasidharan – Aima
- Soubin Shahir – Tribal Gang Member (uncredited)
- Tabu in a special appearance in the song "Aaranne Aarane"

== Themes ==
According to director Santosh Sivan, Urumi is his comment on globalization. He adds that the film resonates with people today because corporate lobbies are causing the displacement of indigenous people across the world. "I have travelled across the world while shooting for films and documentaries and I have seen first hand the displacement and exploitation, the side effects of globalization being suffered by the people who live in close contact to nature. The film centers around a similar situation, but it is removed by a few centuries," said Sivan. The film also focuses on a new perspective of storytelling. "History is written by the victors, the powerful who won. So was Vasco da Gama a brave explorer or an invader after gold," he added.

"The film is designed in such a way that it talks about the present and the past. In the past, some people came and exploited our land and it is happening even now. Perhaps the people who lived then are the people who live now. Still we are not united and our progress is not uniform. The film has also portrayed this aspect in a different manner," Sivan pointed out to Jyothsna Bhavanishankar of "Behind the Woods."

Shankar Ramakrishnan, who wrote the story and screenplay for Urumi after conducting extensive research, said that the film presents history from a different perspective. "Even a small child in Kerala perceives Vasco da Gama as an explorer, who made the first-ever colonial invasion in any part of the world. But there's more to him than that. Urumi is an attempt to portray or rather discuss the many realities that could have affected the course of our history," he said. Shankar Ramakrishnan added that the title is not just suggestive of Kelu's weapon urumi, but "the feeling of vengeance that we carry in our hearts."

== Production ==
"Whenever you travel to Goa or Fort Kochi or such places, you will always find a suite in the name of Vasco da Gama who is revered as a discoverer of India. But when you delve deeper into the history, you will realize that he discovered India for the Western world but he is the conqueror, the first colonial ruler in the world as they all came to trade in pepper but instead of trading they decided to conquer the place. Hence, I thought it would be interesting to make a film that would show the small peppercorn changing the entire history of India. I think for every Indian it would be interesting."

— Santosh Sivan, the cinematographer-cum-director, explained his initial thoughts about the film on Vasco da Gama

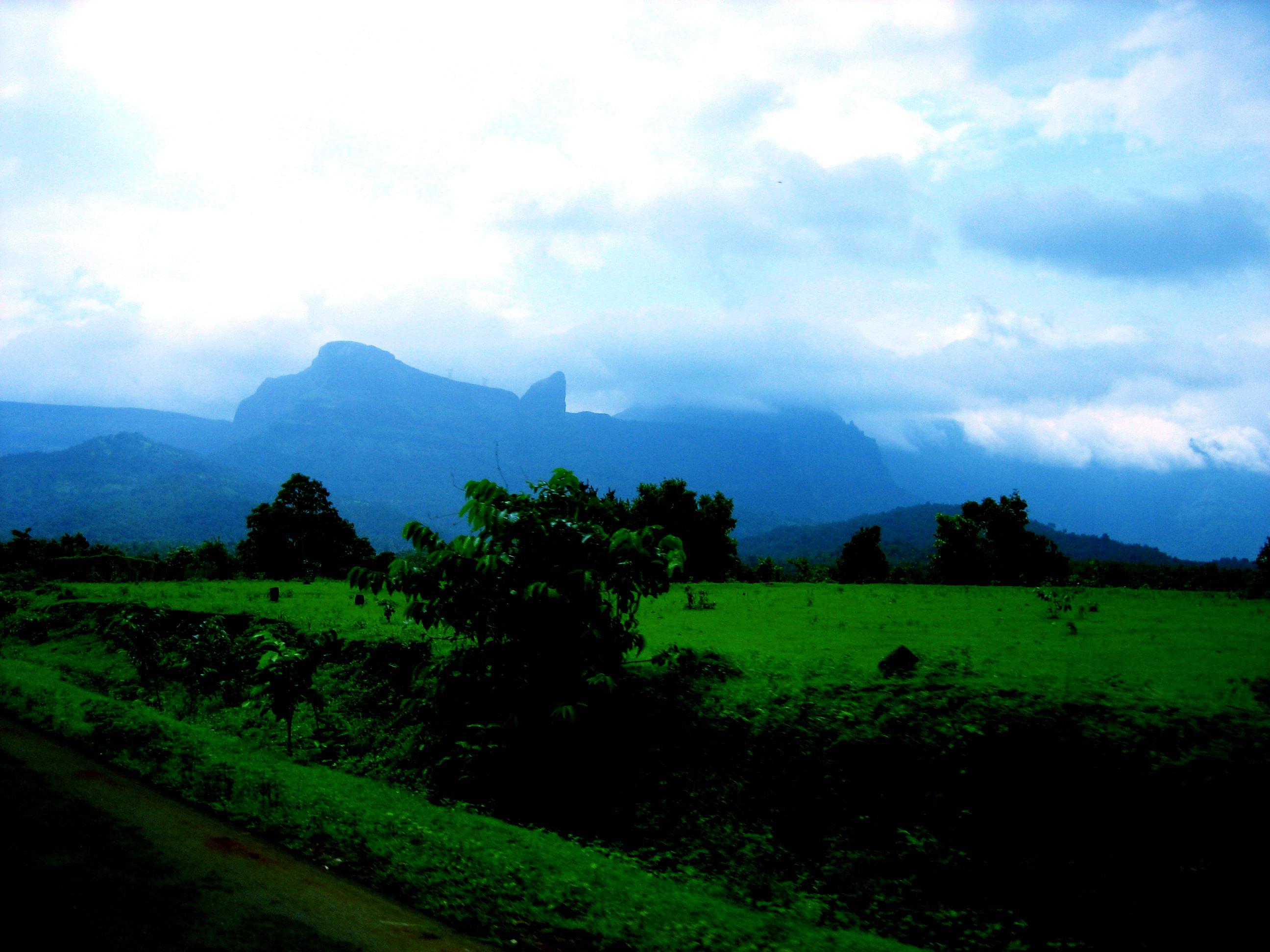
Parts of the film were shot in the forests of Malshej Ghat, Pune

In April 2011, Prithviraj Sukumaran explained the genesis of his production company: "Santosh [Sivan] and I used to keep discussing a historical film during the making of [2010 Tamil film] Raavanan. We roped in Shaji Nadesan, a friend of ours, and thus was born August Cinema." "I like the idea of recreating the bygone era. It is interesting to think of the characters you have heard as real. Also, it excited me to have cannons, swords, and urumi (curling blades) in a film." Santosh Sivan was quite enthusiastic about the idea.

Santosh Sivan and Prithviraj Sukumaran have acknowledged the vital role played by the script writer Shankar Ramakrishnan in the shaping of the film. Ramakrishnan, who had been working for some time as film-maker Ranjith Balakrishnan's associate director, had scripted a tale for a competition based on the medieval history of Kerala. "Called Chekavar, it was on the gallant warriors of Malabar and the pageant of the Mamankam. I had shown it to Prithviraj [Sukumaran] during the shooting of Thirakkatha. He was quite taken up with the script and mentioned it to Santhosh [Sivan] when the two were working on Raavanan. That is how Santosh [Sivan] got in touch with me," explains Shankar Ramakrishnan. "I was nearly imprisoned in Santosh Sivan's flat in Mumbai for about two months when I was writing the story of Urumi. Finally, I told him the one-line story of a boy who wanted to kill Vasco da Gama and the movie took off smoothly from then on. I did not see it as a period film as I felt that the issues it dealt with were contemporary", reveals Shankar Ramakrishnan. Shankar spent two years gathering the material for his script and doing research to flesh out his characters, some of whom are familiar names in Indian history. He went to Kannur and read old ballads and stories of the region.

Alexx O'Neill, who hails from Connecticut in the United States, was cast as Estêvão da Gama. "When I had signed Urumi, it was basically for a single character Estêvão da Gama, but later I played [young] Vasco da Gama's role, too, and had to speak only in Portuguese", O'Neill said. "I wanted to be very true to the accent and the way the character would speak at that time. So I hired a person in Mumbai before the shooting began. Even during the dubbing I had someone to assist me, so that I don't go wrong with the pronunciation", he added.

The 16th century costumes were designed by debutant Eka Lakhani, with make-up by Ranjith Ambady. The clothing worn by the characters, particularly that worn by the women, differed slightly from what would be historically accurate attire. "You cannot re-create exactly how it was then, as women were topless in those days. So, you stylise the kind of dresses they wore in that era," Sivan said to Rediff. Shooting for the film started on 17 August 2010. The production design was carried out by Sunil Babu. The main locations were Kerala and the forests of Malshej Ghat in Maharashtra. Most of the scenes were captured in mostly natural light with a modest budget and minimal visual effects. "It was tedious and the terrain was difficult. On screen, it looks beautiful but we shot standing in slush almost 24/7. People got foot infections. It was laborious", says Nithya Menon, who played a Chirakkal princess. The film was shot with a combination of various formats. The Canon EOS 5D was extensively used, especially for the sensuous song featuring Vidya Balan. The shooting lasted for seven months in the states of Kerala, Karnataka and Maharashtra.

Urumi was filmed by three cinematographers – Santosh Sivan (who is the director of photography as well), renowned wildlife photographer Alphonse Roy, and National Film Award-winning Anjuli Shukla. "Shooting in the mist-laden Harishchadragad in Malshej valley is a difficult task as the light keeps changing constantly. It rains incessantly and the entire area is covered in slush. So each scene is a challenge. It is great to be a part of such a talented team," said Anjali. Sunil Babu, the set designer for Lakshya (2004), Ananthabhadram (2005), and Ghajini (2008), was the art director for the film. Visual effects were carried out by Mumbai-based Reliance Mediaworks.

Santosh Sivan was heavily involved in bringing out a "tailored version" of the film in Telugu in 2011, and in Tamil in 2012. Many scenes in the film were re-shot to avoid lip-sync problems.

== Reception ==
=== Critical response ===
The first exclusive sneak preview of the film was held exclusively for Mani Ratnam. After watching the film, Mani Ratnam was all praise for Santosh Sivan, saying, "Urumi is huge. It is entertaining and the performances are very convincing. It's simply Santosh [Sivan] magic."

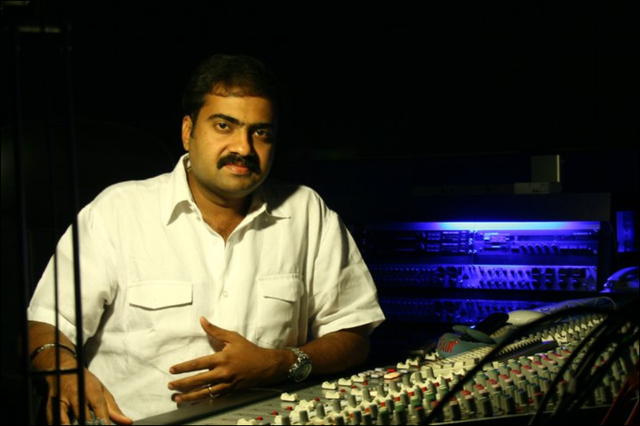
M.R. Rajakrishnan won the Kerala State Film Award for Best Sound Recordist for his work in Urumi.

The film opened to positive reviews from both critics and viewers. It earned accolades as "arguably one of the best historical fantasies Malayalam cinema has ever seen" and was critically acclaimed at film festivals around the world. The Hindu described the film as "a landmark film in Malayalam". Sarswathy Nagarajan describes, "It is a decisive turn for Malayalam cinema because Urumi, while broadening the horizons of Mollywood, is also an attempt to reach out to a global audience. The lavishly made Urumi brings together a host of talented actors and technical personnel from Indian cinema." The Times of India praised the film's acting performances, technical details, cinematography.

Nowrunning gave the film a 3/5 rating and comments that the story is "timeless, the images magical, the acting solid, the script first-rate, the romance delightful, the action deadly and the energy raw – in short, the kind of film that one loves to see, and then animatedly write about." Rediff also gave a 3/5 rating for the movie. Sify gave a 4/5 rating with its movie verdict being "Very Good". According to Sify, "Urumi is a fairy tale fantasy film that has a heart and technical artistry." Indiaglitz rated the movie as a "must see" and commented: "All in all, Urumi is a must watch for all those who love quality cinema. Redefining the traditional qualities of period dramas, Urumi is sure to become a movie that will be respected and adored by Mollywood for its creative panache, tremendous performances, and great technical wizardry."

The film was also one of the seven Malayalam films selected to be screened at the Indian Panorama section of International Film Festival of India.

The Tamil version released by Kalaipuli S Dhanu's V Creations opened to positive reception from critics as well as audiences. The Hindu wrote of the Tamil version, "From the very first scene of this film to the last, director-cum-cinematographer Santosh Sivan proves to be on top of this technical masterpiece. The songs, waterfall sequences and the war scenes evoke a feel of realism due to its stunning visuals and brilliant re-recording. Certain portions in the film become very melodramatic to suit the Indian audiences thereby derailing the pace. The brilliantly choreographed action sequences seem to be a tad too loud for the ears." Notable websites and Tamil magazines praised the dialogue of the Tamil version. The film was released as Ek Yodha Shoorveer in Hindi in 2016 and was widely criticised for "laughable dubbing".

The film has also caught the eye of Oliver Stone. "I had met Stone while he was in Mumbai a few months ago and he was curious when he came to know that I was doing a film on Da Gama. We had a discussion about it and he wanted me to send him a copy once the film was done," said Santosh Sivan.

=== Box office ===
The film fetched over ₹3 crore (US$310,000)The film collected ₹4.05 crore (US$420,000) in three days at 77 theatres in Kerala and it had broken the previous record of Prithviraj Sukumaran film Anwar (2010). The film became a notable hit in Tamil and Telugu as well. The film collected US$7,023 from UK box office.

== Accolades ==
Award	Category	Recipient (s)	Ref(s)
Kerala State Film Awards	Best Background Music	Deepak Dev	
Kerala State Film Awards	Best Sound Mixing	M. R. Rajakrishnan	
Imagineindia International Film Festival (Madrid)	Best Film	Urumi	
Imagineindia International Film Festival (Madrid)	Best Director	Santosh Sivan	
Nana Film Awards	Second Best Actor	Jagathy Sreekumar	
Nana Film Awards	Best Cinematographer	Santosh Sivan	
Nana Film Awards	Best Music Director	Deepak Dev	
Nana Film Awards	Best Lyricist	Rafeeq Ahammed	
Nana Film Awards	Best Female Playback Singer	Manjari Babu	
Nana Film Awards	Best Makeup Artist	Ranjith Ambady	
Nana Film Awards	Best actor	Prithviraj	
Reporter Film Awards	Best Cinematographer	Santosh Sivan	
Reporter Film Awards	Best Art Director	Sunil Babu	
Reporter Film Awards	Best Visual Effects	Karthik Kotamraju	
Reporter Film Awards	Best Background Score	Deepak Dev	
Reporter Film Awards	Best Sound Mixing and Recording	M. R. Rajakrishnan, Anand Babu	

== Music ==
The songs and the background score for the film were composed by Deepak Dev, with lyrics by Kaithapram Damodaran Namboothiri, Rafeeq Ahammed and Engandiyur Chandrasekharan. The music album consists of nine songs.

== Sequel ==
In September 2025, writer-filmmaker Shankar Ramakrishnan announced that the script for a sequel to Urumi, titled Urumi 2, had finally been completed after more than 12 years.

The story is set approximately a century after the events of the original film and will take place in Vadakara, Kerala. The sequel aims to explore themes of reviving forgotten cultural memories of Kerala. The production team is preparing for extensive pre-production work, including costume design, casting, and historical research. Details regarding whether Santosh Sivan will return as director or Prithviraj Sukumaran will reprise his lead role have not yet been confirmed.

== See also ==
- List of Asian historical drama films
