= Diés Iraé =

2025 Indian film by Rahul Sadasivan

- Theatrical release poster
- Directed by: Rahul Sadasivan
- Written by: Rahul Sadasivan
- Produced by: Chakravarthy Ramachandra; S. Sashikanth
- Starring: Pranav Mohanlal; Gibin Gopinath; Jaya Kurup; Sushmitha Bhat
- Cinematography: Shehnad Jalal
- Edited by: Shafique Mohammed Ali
- Music by: Christo Xavier
- Production companies: Night Shift Studios; YNOT Studios
- Distributed by: Think Studios (domestic); Home Screen Entertainment (overseas)
- Release date: 31 October 2025
- Running time: 113 minutes
- Country: India
- Language: Malayalam
- Box office: ₹82.18 crore

Diés Iraé (Latin for "Day of Wrath") is a 2025 Indian Malayalam-language horror thriller film written and directed by Rahul Sadasivan and produced by Chakravarthy Ramachandra and S. Sashikanth under Night Shift Studios and YNOT Studios. It stars Pranav Mohanlal with Sushmita Bhat, Gibin Gopinath and Jaya Kurup. The film follows a man, who is increasingly haunted by a former classmate, after taking her hairclip as a souvenir.

The film was officially announced in March 2025 under the tentative title NSS2, as it is Night Shift Studios' second production, and the official title was revealed the following May. Principal photography took place from March to April 2025. The film features music composed by Christo Xavier, cinematography by Shehnad Jalal and editing by Shafique Mohammed Ali.

Diés Iraé was released worldwide on 31 October 2025, coinciding with Halloween. The film received positive reviews, with praise for the performances, direction, cinematography, music, horror elements, screenplay and runtime. It is currently the sixth highest-grossing Malayalam film of 2025 and one of the highest-grossing Malayalam films of all time.

== Plot ==
Rohan, an Indo-American architect and the son of Shankar, owner of the prominent firm Shankar Associates, leads a comfortable life in Kerala. One day, he learns of the suicide of Kani, a Bharatanatyam dancer and former classmate with whom he had a brief relationship after reconnecting at an alumni event. Moved by her death, Rohan visits her grieving family, where he meets their neighbour Madhusudanan “Madhu” Potti, a descendant of the Potti lineage of traditional exorcists. While in Kani's room, Rohan takes a red hair clip as a keepsake.

After returning home, Rohan begins experiencing disturbing supernatural events. He hears the jingling of chilanka, feels unseen hands ruffle his hair, and is violently attacked by an invisible presence that chokes him. Frightened, he confides in Madhu, who advises him to wait until Kani's pathinaru, believing her soul will then find peace.

However, the hauntings intensify. Hoping to distract himself, Rohan invites Kani's brother Kiran to stay with him. During the visit, the spirit violently throws Kiran off a balcony, leaving him severely injured and disfigured. Soon after, Rohan witnesses the ghostly figure — a tall, thin, headless man — confirming that the haunting spirit is not Kani. Madhu concludes that it may be the restless soul of someone connected to Kani's past who bore a grudge against her.

Their investigation leads them to Kani's former dance school, where they learn of a local copy-shop worker named Philip who had obsessively stalked her. Madhu discovers that “Philip” is actually Manu Philip Sebastian, the son of Kani's neighbour and housemaid, Elsamma.

Rohan visits Elsamma's house, initially to obtain contact details of an agent who helped Manu go abroad, unaware that Philip and Manu are the same person. There, he discovers Manu's decaying corpse lying on his bed, wearing Kani's chilanka on his feet. Elsamma knocks him unconscious, revealing that she had stolen Kani's anklets to comfort her cancer-inflicted son in his final days. Because Manu's body was never properly laid to rest and his mother's fervent prayers anchored his soul to the mortal world, his spirit remained trapped — vengeful and confused — attacking Rohan for taking Kani's hair clip.

Madhu finds Rohan unconscious and they both struggle with Elsamma. Rohan grabs a knife, cuts off Manu's rotting legs bearing the chilanka, and sets them ablaze as that was what bound his spirit. The ritual fire spreads, consuming the house and finally releasing Manu's tormented spirit.

In the aftermath, Madhu is approached by George, who requests his help to investigate strange occurrences in a house once occupied by a woman and her son, hinting to the incidences that occur in Bhoothakaalam. Meanwhile, as Rohan prepares to return to the United States, he is confronted once again—this time by the ghost of Kani—suggesting that his ordeal may not yet be over.

== Cast ==
- Pranav Mohanlal as Rohan Shankar
- Sushmita Bhat as Kani, Rohan's ex-girlfriend (spirit)
- Gibin Gopinath as Madhusudhanan "Madhu" Potti, a descendant of Kodumon Potti
- Shine Tom Chacko as Manu / Philip Sebastian, Kani's stalker (spirit) (Photographic Appearance)
- Jaya Kurup as Elsamma, Manu / Philip's Mother
- Arun Ajikumar as Kiran, Kani's younger brother and Rohan's friend
- Sreedhanya as Kani's mother
- Madan Babu K. as Kani's father
- Sudha Sumithran as Kani's grandmother
- Manohari Joy as Madhu's mother
- Swathi Das Prabhu as Vinoy, Rohan's friend
- Athulya Chandra as Tessa, Rohan's friend
- Anagha Ashok as Kani's friend
- Saheer Mohammed as Church Priest
- Manoj Moorthy as Rohan's security guard
- Nidhinya Pattayil as Rohan's cook
- Priya Sreejith as Rohan's maid
- Saiju Kurup as George (Cameo Appearance)

== Production ==
=== Development ===
In December 2024, several industry analysts in X.com reported that director Rahul Sadasivan had cast Pranav Mohanlal in his upcoming film, which, like his previous works, would also be a horror film. They noted that the shoot was expected to begin in either January or February 2025 and be completed in 40 days. In an interview in January 2025, Rahul confirmed that his next film would indeed be a horror project, though he refrained from sharing further details. The official announcement came on 24 March 2025, when Chakravarthy Ramachandra of Night Shift Studios, S. Sashikanth of YNOT Studios, Rahul, and Pranav revealed through their social media handles that they were collaborating on a horror film tentatively titled NSS 2 (indicating the second production from Night Shift Studios). The same producers had backed Rahul's previous film Bramayugam, and for this project, he retained its core technical team. The announcement also confirmed that filming had commenced on the same day.

The project marks Pranav's debut in the horror genre. The screenplay is written by Rahul himself. In a correspondence with Variety, Rahul stated that "compared to my previous films, Diés Iraé explores a diametrically opposite emotional spectrum which connects to the new generation." Describing the film's genre, he added that "it stays true to the horror thriller space." The publication also reported that the film is slated for a worldwide release by the latter half of 2025. The title was officially announced in early May, during post-production. The title translates to "day of wrath" in Latin, referencing a medieval hymn associated with the Judgment Day. According to the makers, the story is based on true events.

=== Casting ===
Besides Pranav, the rest of the cast was kept under wraps until the release of the first teaser. The teaser revealed Gibin Gopinath, Manohari Joy, and Arun Ajikumar. The cast also includes Jaya Kurup.

=== Filming ===
Principal photography began on 24 March 2025. Shehnad Jalal was the cinematographer. Filming was wrapped up on 29 April 2025. Jothish Shankar served as the art director, while editing was done by Shafique Mohammed Ali. Kalai Kingson was the stunt director. Sound design was provided by Jayadevan Chakkadath, while sound mixing was done by M. R. Rajakrishnan

== Soundtrack ==
Diés Iraé

Soundtrack album by Christo Xavier
- Released: October 2025
- Genre: Feature film soundtrack
- Length: 50m 2s
- Label: Night Shift Records

The film's soundtrack was composed by Christo Xavier.

=== Track listing ===
No.	Title	Length
1.	"The Day of Wrath"	3:45
2.	"Diés Iraé: Teaser Theme"	1:36
3.	"Premonition"	1:27
4.	"The Wailing"	1:27
5.	"Silence"	1:12
6.	"Sense it"	1:22
7.	"Feel it"	2:28
8.	"Lost in Thoughts"	1:26
9.	"Face it"	1:57
10.	"The Rage"	1:15
11.	"Wait for the 16th Day"	3:08
12.	"No Hope"	1:45
13.	"The Confrontation"	1:02
14.	"Who is it"	2:36
15.	"Clueless"	1:24
16.	"Guilty"	1:22
17.	"The Stalker"	1:40
18.	"The Search"	1:36
19.	"Hidden in Plain Sight"	1:07
20.	"Beyond the Veil"	2:50
21.	"Won’t let Go"	3:14
22.	"Anklets"	1:10
23.	"Dance with the Dead"	1:35
24.	"Salvation"	3:36
25.	"Farewell"	1:44
26.	"What The F…"	2:18
Total length:		50:02

== Release ==
Diés Iraé was released in theatres worldwide on 31 October 2025, coinciding with Halloween. The film had paid premiere shows in select theatres in India and abroad on 30 October from 9 PM IST.

=== Certification ===
Diés Iraé received an A certificate from CBFC due to its gory content.

=== Distribution ===
Diés Iraé was distributed in Kerala through Think Studios via E4 Entertainments. Throughout India, it was distributed by Think Studios, excluding Karnataka. The overseas release was distributed by Berkshire DreamHouse, excluding United Kingdom and Australia. Home Screen Entertainments distributed the film globally.

=== Home media ===
The digital rights of the film were acquired by JioHotstar and ManoramaMAX. Diés Iraé began streaming on JioHotstar worldwide and on ManoramaMAX (outside India) from 5 December 2025.

== Reception ==
=== Critical reception ===
Diés Iraé received positive reviews from critics. On the review aggregator website Rotten Tomatoes, 75% of 15 critics' reviews are positive, with an average rating of 6.9/10.

Janani K. of India Today rated the film 3.5/5 stars and wrote, "Director Rahul Sadasivan's Diés Iraé, starring Pranav Mohanlal and Gibin Gopinath, is an immersive horror thriller that is intelligent and never takes the audience for granted. With top-notch making, 'Dies Irae' is a fitting addition to Rahul Sadasivan's filmography." Sajin Shrijith of The Week rated the film 4.5/5 stars and wrote, "After Bhoothakaalam and Bramayugam, director Rahul Sadasivan outdoes himself with a trippy, one-of-a-kind horror experience that dares to take some unprecedented leaps."

Anandu Suresh of The Indian Express rated the film 4/5 stars and wrote, "One of the major factors that makes Diés Iraé a magnificent horror thriller is that Rahul hasn't tried to 'scare the audience' all the time. Yes, there are a few jump scares and startling moments, but they only help amplify what the director has already set. Instead of shocking viewers, Rahul has made the movie slither under their skin step by step, each move sending a shiver down their spine. Rather than petrifying, he has focused on making the audience writhe, ensuring that the sensation lingers." S. R. Praveen of The Hindu called Diés Iraé "one of the finest horror films in Malayalam." She wrote that the film "crafts a chilling horror experience that transforms everyday moments into sources of dread, further proving his greatness in the genre".

Vishal Menon of The Hollywood Reporter India described the film as the "arrival of a modern master of horror" and wrote, "The horrors of Rahul Sadasivan's work go beyond jump scares and camera tricks, taking you to places in your head you never wanted to go to."

=== Box office ===
In its 3-day opening weekend, Diés Iraé collected ₹15.38 crore from Kerala and ₹4.31 crore from Rest of India, totalling ₹19.69 crore domestically and further collections came from overseas to approximately ₹39 crore worldwide. By sixth day, the film crossed ₹50 crore from the global box office. In 18 days, Diés Iraé has earned ₹80.1 crore worldwide with an India gross collection of ₹47.1 crore and an overseas total of ₹33 crore, concluding at ₹82 crore.
