= Loktak Lairembee (film) =

- Poster
- Directed by: Haobam Paban Kumar
- Screenplay by: Sudhir Naoroibam; Haobam Paban Kumar
- Story by: Sudhir Naoroibam
- Produced by: Haobam Paban Kumar
- Starring: Ningthoujam Sanatomba; Sagolsem Thambalsang
- Cinematography: Shehnad Jalal
- Edited by: Sankha
- Music by: Sukanta Majumdar
- Production company: Oli Pictures
- Distributed by: Oli Pictures
- Release date: 7 October 2016 (Busan)
- Running time: 72 minutes
- Country: India
- Language: Meiteilon (Manipuri)

Loktak Lairembee (transl. Loktak Goddess), also known as Lady of the Lake, is a 2016 Indian Manipuri film directed and produced by Haobam Paban Kumar. It stars Ningthoujam Sanatomba and Sagolsem Thambalsang in the lead roles. The film had participated in many international film festivals across the globe and won several awards. The film won the National Film Award for Best Film on Environment / Conservation / Preservation at the 64th National Film Awards. It is the first Manipuri film to be certified by Central Board of Film Certification (CBFC) as a digital film. It is based on Sudhir Naoroibam's short story Nongmei.

Loktak Lairembee was screened at many film festivals, which include 14th Indian Film Festival of Stuttgart, 8th London Indian Film Festival, 2nd BRICS Film Festival, 41st Hong Kong International Film Festival, Indian Film Festival of Los Angeles 2017, 67th Berlin International Film Festival, 15th Pune International Film Festival, 11th Asia Pacific Screen Awards, 21st Kerala International Film Festival 2016, 3rd Dubai International Film Festival 2016, Indian Kaleidoscope Film Festival, New York 2016, 47th International Film Festival of India, 22nd Kolkata International Film Festival, 21st Agartala Film Festival, 18th Mumbai Film Festival, 21st Busan International Film Festival and The Himalayan Film Festival 2021.

== Cast ==
- Ningthoujam Sanatomba
- Sagolsem Thambalsang
- Oinam Rajen Singh

== Plot ==
Following the accidental discovery of a gun, a depressed fisherman experiences a new confidence that soon threatens to balloon into arrogance.

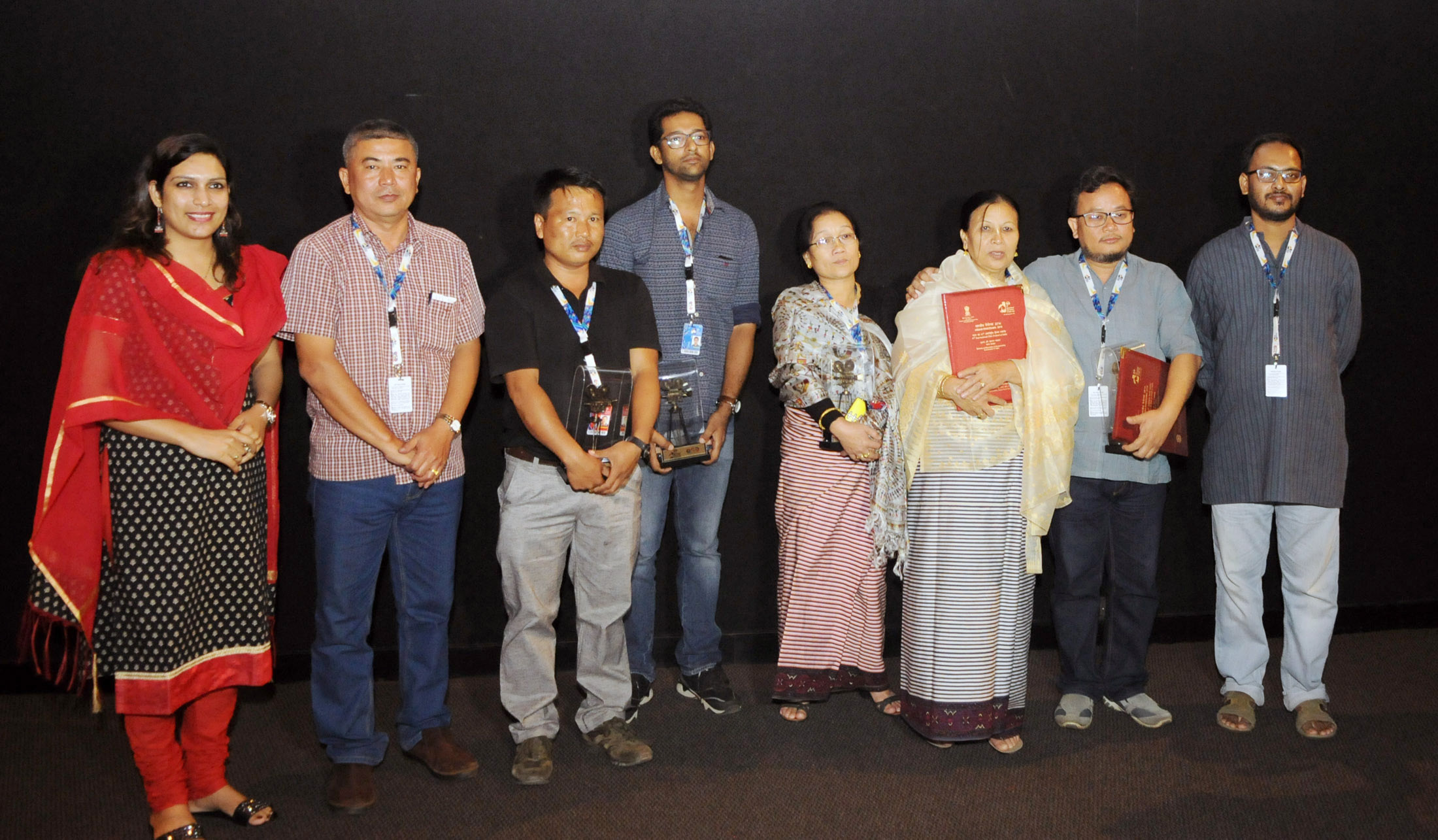
Film crew at IFFI (2016)

== Accolades ==
Loktak Lairembee bagged two awards at the 10th Manipur State Film Awards 2016. The film won the National Film Award for Best Film on Environment / Conservation / Preservation at the 64th National Film Awards. The citation for the National Award reads, "The film brings out the nuances of an environmental issue in a heart wrenching and touching manner".

| Award | Category | Winner's name | Result |
|---|---|---|---|
| 64th National Film Awards | Best Film on Environment or Conservation or Preservation | Haobam Paban Kumar | Won |
| 9th Bengaluru International Film Festival 2017 | FIPRESCI India P.K. Nair Memorial Critics' Jury Award | Haobam Paban Kumar | Won |
| 10th Manipur State Film Awards 2016 | Best Feature Film | Haobam Paban Kumar | Won |
| 10th Manipur State Film Awards 2016 | Best Story | Sudhir Naoroibam | Won |
| 14th Indian Film Festival of Stuttgart Germany | German Star of India | Haobam Paban Kumar | Won |
| Indian Film Festival of Los Angeles | Special Mention | Haobam Paban Kumar | Won |
| 15th Pune International Film Festival | Special Jury Award (World Cinema section) | Haobam Paban Kumar | Won |
| 26th G. Aravindan Puruskaram 2016 | Best Debut Director | Haobam Paban Kumar | Won |
| 2nd Bodhisattva International Film Festival 2017 | Silver Bodhisattva | Haobam Paban Kumar | Won |
| 18th Mumbai Film Festival | Golden Gateway | Haobam Paban Kumar | Won |
| 22nd Kolkata International Film Festival 2016 | NETPAC (Asian Select) | Haobam Paban Kumar | Won |
