= Haobam Paban Kumar =

Indian film director

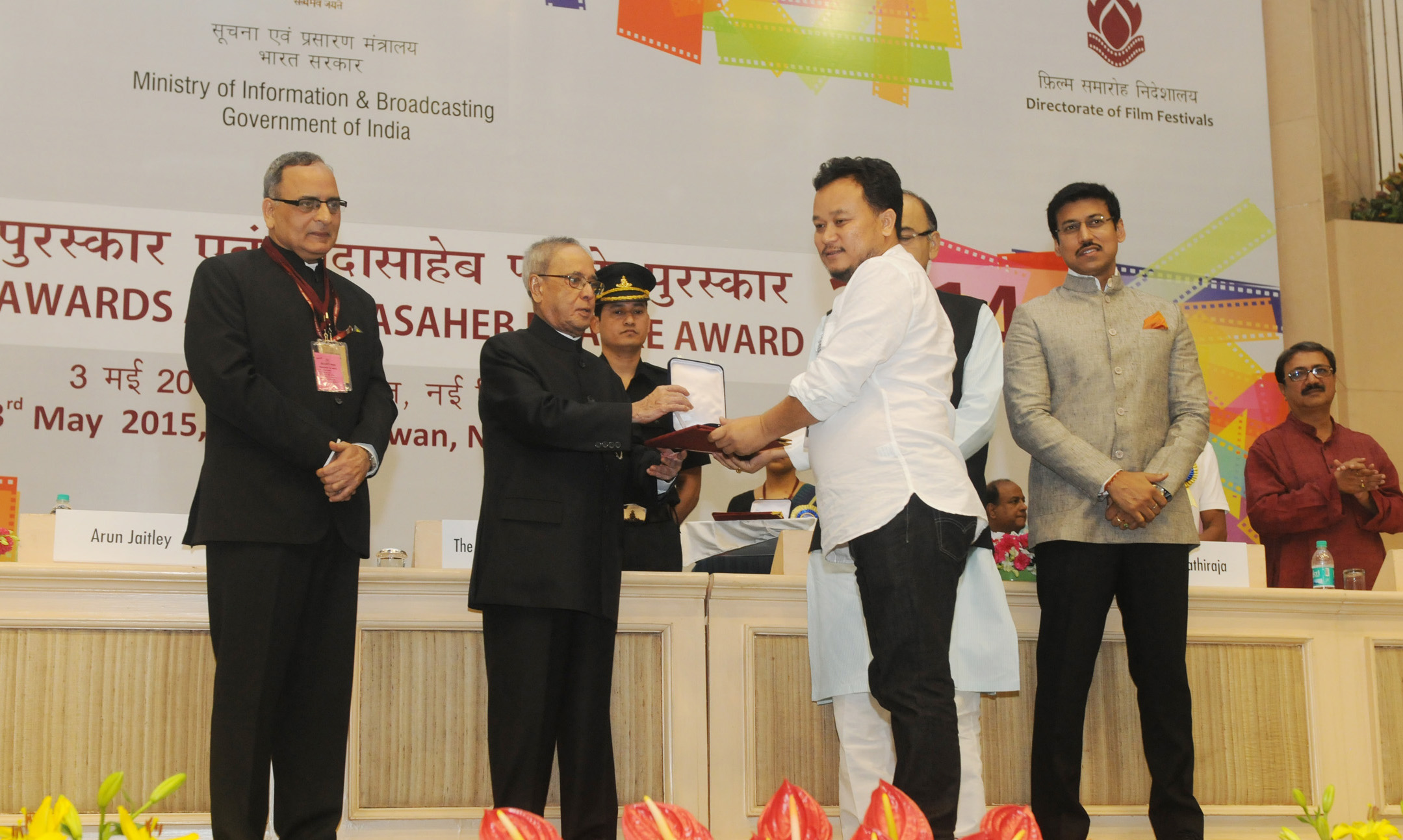
- Haobam Paban Kumar receiving the National Award from the President of India at the 62nd National Film Awards function
- Born: Manipur, India
- Education: Satyajit Ray Film and Television Institute
- Occupations: Film director, Producer
- Awards: National Film Award for Best Investigative Film (2013); National Film Award for Best Film on Environment Conservation/Preservation (2016)

Haobam Paban Kumar is an Indian filmmaker from the state of Manipur. Kumar's films and documentaries have been screened in several places across the globe.

Kumar's debut feature film Loktak Lairembee (Lady of the Lake) won the National Film Award for Best Film on Environment Conservation/Preservation at the 64th National Film Awards 2017. He also won German Star of India at the 14th Indian Film Festival in Stuttgart, Germany for the film in 2017. Kumar's documentary AFSPA 1958 in 2006 was one of the highly critical and widely appreciated films across the globe for his daredevil attempt to showcase the harsh reality of the ill effects of Armed Forces Special Power Act in Manipur state.

Kumar’s other films The First Leap (2008), Mr India (2009) and Ruptured Spring (2012) have also been appreciated. Kumar's Phum Shang (Floating Life) on Loktak lake, the largest freshwater lake in northeast India which is characterized by its unique floating biomass, has also brought laurels for the filmmaker.

He was the head of jury for non-feature films in the Indian Panorama section (51st International Film Festival of India).

== Filmography ==
=== Feature and documentary films ===
Year	Film title	Note
2023	Joseph's Son	
2023	Iron Women of Manipur	
2020	Pabung Syam	
2020	Nine Hills One Valley	
2016	Loktak Lairembee	Debut Feature film
2014	Phum Shang	
2012	Ruptured Spring	
2010	Nupishabi	
2009	Mr. India	
2008	The First Leap	
2006	A Cry In The Dark	
2006	Ngaihak Lambida	
2005	AFSPA, 1958	
