= Christo Xavier =

Indian music composer and playback singer

- Born: July 21, 1999 (age 27)
- Years active: 2023–present

Christo Xavier is an Indian composer and singer who predominantly works in Malayalam cinema. He rose to fame for his work in Bramayugam (2024).

== Career ==
Xavier made his composing debut in 2023 with Madanolsavam and later composed the music for Journey of Love 18+, where he made his playback singing debut.

In 2024, Xavier composed the music for the critically acclaimed film Bramayugam, starring Mammootty. He was praised for his work and won the Kerala State Film Award for Best Music Director – Score. He collaborated with Mammootty a second time that year for Turbo, replacing Justin Varghese. Later that year, he composed the music for Sookshmadarshini and made his Tamil debut with Sorgavaasal.

In 2025, Xavier composed the soundtrack for the Malayalam film Diés Iraé. He is set to make his Telugu debut with Rowdy Janardhana, starring Vijay Deverakonda.

== Discography ==
=== As composer ===
Year	Title	Language	Notes	Ref.
2023	Madanolsavam	Malayalam	Debut	
2023	Journey of Love 18+	Malayalam		
2024	Bramayugam	Malayalam		
2024	Turbo	Malayalam		
2024	Sookshmadarshini	Malayalam		
2024	Sorgavaasal	Tamil	Debut in Tamil cinema	
2025	Diés Iraé	Malayalam		
2026	Bouma	Malayalam		
2026	Bachelor Party D'eux	Malayalam		
2027	Rowdy Janardhana †	Telugu	Debut in Telugu cinema	

=== As playback singer ===
Year	Title	Song	Composer	Artists	Notes	Ref.
2023	Journey of Love 18+	"Kalyana Raavaane"	himself	Muhammad Mubas, Yogi Sekar	Debut as Playback singer	
2023	Journey of Love 18+	"Kaanal Kinaave"	himself			
2024	Bramayugam	"Poomani Maalika"	himself			
2024	Bramayugam	"Thambaye"	himself			
2024	Bramayugam	"Aadithyan Illathe"	himself			
2024	Bramayugam	"The Beginning"	himself	Atheena		
2024	Bramayugam	"The Age of Madness"	himself	Sayanth S.	Also Tamil, Telugu, Kannada and Hindi Versions	
2024	Turbo	"Turbo Trailer Theme"	himself	Arjun Ashokan		

== Accolades ==
Year	Award	Category	Recipient	Result	Notes	Ref.
2024	Kerala State Film Awards	Best Music Director – Score	Bramayugam	Won		
