= Thangjam Manorama =

Indian murder victim

- Born: 1971
- Died: July 11, 2004 (aged 32); Manipur, India

Thangjam Manorama (1971–2004) was a 32-year-old woman activist from Manipur, India who was killed by the Indian paramilitary unit 17th Assam Rifles on 11 July 2004. Her bullet-ridden and badly mutilated dead body was found abandoned three kilometers away from her home where she was arrested the night before. She was shot several times. Official investigations recorded that she was tortured and raped before being killed.

== Disparities in official version ==
At the time of the arrest, no incriminating items were found, as per the arrest memo. Later it was stated that a grenade and other items had been seized from her home.

Assam Rifles claimed that she was shot while trying to escape. However, no blood was found near the body despite six bullet wounds. No soldier was identified as having tried to run or detain her.

Given these disparities, a commission of inquiry was set up by the Manipur government in 2004, and submitted its report in Nov 2004. However, the Gauhati High court also looked into the matter and ruled that since the Assam Rifles had been deployed under the Armed Forces (Special Powers) Act, 1958, the state government did not have jurisdiction over them, and the case should be dealt with by the central government. Thus, the report was never released subject to this judgment.

== Protests against the AFSPA ==
The failure to assign culpability in the alleged rape and murder case led to widespread and extended protests in Manipur and Delhi.

Five days after the killing, around 30 middle-aged women walked naked through Imphal to the Assam Rifles headquarters, shouting: "Indian Army, rape us too... We are all Manorama’s mothers." Noted author M. K. Binodini Devi returned her Padma Shree award in protest. Protests continued in 2004 and over the years.

In early 2012, the Justice Varma committee includes measures for reviewing AFSPA as part of a set of steps to reduce violence against women; these measures are partly been attributed to the protests involving Manorama.

In December 2014, in a case filed at Supreme Court of India, the apex court told to government to pay a compensation of Rs. 10 lakhs to Manorama's family. The case was accepted for hearing in the court. It was seen as a partial victory, but the doubt remains, as, even in the past, compensations were declared for victims of AFSPA, but courts could not deliver any judgement against security personnel for awarding punishment.
