= Bouma (film) =

2026 Indian film

- Theatrical release poster
- Directed by: Rejin S. Babu
- Written by: Dony S Kadammanitta Rejin S. Babu
- Produced by: Basam Kadiyar
- Starring: Sagar Surya; Dileesh Pothan; Vineeth; Revathy Sarma; Madhupal
- Cinematography: Sharan Velayudhan
- Edited by: Sooraj E. S.
- Music by: Christo Xavier
- Production company: Atus Films
- Distributed by: Bhavana Release (Kerala); PVR Inox Pictures
- Release date: 12 November 2026
- Country: India
- Language: Malayalam

Bouma is an Indian Malayalam language mystery horror thriller film co-written and directed by Rejin S. Babu. It was released in theatres on 12 November 2026.

== Plot ==
The story of Bouma revolves around an estate bungalow called Rose Villa with a history of some mysterious deaths that happened years ago. Celine, a club singer, comes to know that she is the current sole heir of this bungalow. The film follows the journey of Celine and her friend Jacob to Rose Villa located in Peermade, hoping to sell it and make some money.

This film, which alternates between the past and the present, also features a parallel narrative centred on Esho, a police officer who leads a criminal investigation.

== Cast ==
- Dileesh Pothan as Esho
- Vineeth as Samuel
- Sagar Surya as Jacob
- Revathi Sarma as Sunset / Celine
- Madhupal as Mathews
- Lenaa as Jessy
- Merin Philip as Bathsheba
- Aditi Balan as the police officer
- Mokksha Sengupta as Rose
- Raghunath Paleri
- Jaffar Idukki
- Vijay Babu
- Manikuttan as Shahul
- Kavya S Bhanu as Reshmi
- Sajin Cherukayil as Satheesh

== Development ==
Bouma is directed by Rejin S Babu, based on a story by Dony S. Kadamanitta. Cinematography is done by Sharan Velayudhan, editing by Sooraj E S, and the music director is Christo Xavier.

It is produced by Basam Kadiyar under the banner of Atus Films. Apart from Malayalam, Bouma was also released in Tamil, Telugu, Hindi and Kannada languages. Bhavana Releases distributed the film in Kerala.

== Music ==
The first song, "Paarum Paaraake", written by Vaisakh Sugunan, composed by Christo Xavier and sung by Sid Sriram was released on 02 November 2026.

== Release ==
Bouma first look poster was released in 19 July 2026. The film was released on 12 November 2026.

== Reception ==
Anjay Das. N.T. of Mathrubhumi described Bouma as a new step in thrillers. OnManorama's Princy Alexander described it as a reasonably engaging horror thriller, praising its atmospheric tension, narrative structure and technical aspects while noting shortcomings in characterisation and believability. She also wrote that the film's strengths is its compact runtime and relatively focused screenplay.

Cinema Express's Vivek Santhosh praised Bouma for its cinematography, sound design, editing and atmosphere, but criticised its predictable plot, weak writing and lack of narrative depth. S. R. Praveen of The Hindu described the film as an engaging gothic horror until the final fumble.

The director has adopted an intense horror-making style throughout the film that never gets boring, writes Tony Mathew of Manorama Online. Giving a rating of 3.5/5, Ashwini P of Samayam Malayalam writes that, although there are some minor flaws in the story and screenplay, Bouma succeeds in making the audience wait for the next scene without losing their interest.
