= Madanolsavam (2023 film) =

2023 Indian film by Sudheesh Gopinath

- Theatrical release poster
- Directed by: Sudheesh Gopinath
- Screenplay by: Ratheesh Balakrishnan Poduval
- Story by: E Santhosh Kumar
- Produced by: Vinayaka Ajith
- Starring: Suraj Venjaramoodu; Babu Antony; Rajesh Madhavan; Bhama Arun
- Cinematography: Shehnad Jalal
- Music by: Christo Xavier
- Production companies: Saina Movies; Ajith Vinayaka Films
- Release date: 14 April 2023
- Country: India
- Language: Malayalam

Madanolsavam is a 2023 Indian Malayalam-language satirical comedy film directed by Sudheesh Gopinath and featuring Suraj Venjaramoodu, Babu Antony, Rajesh Madhavan and Bhama Arun in lead roles. Produced by Vinayaka Ajith under the banner of Saina Movies, the film portrays the protagonist's journey from being a mere cog in the wheel to defying the odds and fighting his unusual circumstances to regain control of his life and destiny.

== Premise ==
Two men who share the same first name sparks off the drama in Madanolsavam. In Balal, Kasaragod Madanan Mallakkara (Suraj Venjaramoodu) paints chickens and sells them for a living. During an election, the state's dominant party puts him up as a dummy candidate against the wealthy Madanan Manjakkaran (Babu Antony) to confuse voters. He is then kidnapped by the Namboothiri goons (Rajesh Madhavan and Ranji Kankol) and is tossed like a ping-pong ball between the two parties. Also tossed around with him are his aunt, the widow Alice and her child. Madanan dwells in a state of inertia in the early part of the film. Just when he is getting his act together, his life is snatched from him. He is naïve and uninterested in the goings-on beyond his own little world until then. Madanolsavam examines the question of whether he does and can stay that way when powerful forces threaten to rip his existence to shreds.

== Cast ==
- Suraj Venjaramoodu as Madanan Mallakkara
- Babu Antony as Madanan Manjakkaran
- Rajesh Madhavan as Sankaran Namboothiri
- Ranji Kankol as Achuthan Namboothiri
- Bhama Arun as Alice
- PP Kunhikrishnan as Chindan
- Ratheesh Balakrishnan Poduval as Nishad Purushan
- Rakesh Ushar as PRO Ouseph
- Sumesh Chandran as Boost Mohanan
- Swathi Das Prabhu as Joju
- Rajesh Azhikodan as Binu Thankachan
- Chandrika Madikai as Madanan Mallakkara's aunt

== Production ==
The shooting of the film was wrap up on 13 December 2022. Later the trailer and teaser was released.

== Release ==
The film released theatrically on 14 April 2023. It started streaming on Amazon Prime Video from 23 December 2024.

== Reception ==
Swathi P. Ajith, critic of Onmanorama, wrote that "Madanolsavam is a great choice for viewers who are looking for a movie that is not too serious but still funny and entertaining." A critic from OTTplay stated that "Madanolsavam has enough laughs and would definitely please those who are inclined to social satires, but the movie's required more verve to keep the audience engaged in the second half" and gave 3 out of 5 ratings.
