= Turbo (2024 film) =

2024 Indian film directed by Vysakh

- Theatrical release poster
- Directed by: Vysakh
- Written by: Midhun Manuel Thomas
- Produced by: Mammootty
- Starring: Mammootty; Raj B. Shetty; Kabir Duhan Singh; Sunil; Anjana Jayaprakash; Shabareesh Varma; Dileesh Pothan
- Cinematography: Vishnu Sarma
- Edited by: Shameer Muhammed
- Music by: Christo Xavier
- Production company: Mammootty Kampany
- Distributed by: Wayfarer Films (India); Truth Global Films (Overseas)
- Release date: 23 May 2024
- Running time: 155 minutes
- Country: India
- Language: Malayalam
- Budget: est. ₹70 crore
- Box office: est. ₹72.50 crore

Turbo is a 2024 Indian Malayalam-language action comedy film directed by Vysakh, written by Midhun Manuel Thomas and produced by Mammootty under Mammootty Kampany. The film stars Mammootty in the title role alongside Raj B. Shetty, Kabir Duhan Singh, Sunil, Shabareesh Varma, Anjana Jayaprakash, Niranjana Anoop, Bindu Panicker, Dileesh Pothan and Johny Antony in supporting roles. In the film, Aruvipurathu Jose, nicknamed Turbo Jose, a short-tempered but kind-hearted jeep driver from Idukki. He often lands in trouble because he can't tolerate injustice or bullying. Jose's life changes when he gets involved in the love problem of his close friend Jerry, a bank manager in Chennai. Jerry loves Indulekha, but her powerful family is against the relationship. When Jose interferes to help them, things go wrong—Jerry backs out out of fear, and Jose becomes the target of legal trouble. To escape arrest, Jose leaves for Chennai.

The principal photography commenced in October 2023. Coimbatore, Idukki and Chennai were the filming locations. It was wrapped up on 18 February 2024. The music was composed by Christo Xavier, while the cinematography and editing were handled by Vishnu Sarma and Shameer Muhammed respectively.

Turbo received a U/A certificate and was theatrically released on 23 May 2024. It received popular appreciation from audiences and the direction by Vysakh, music and background score, action sequences and cast performances drew praise. The film grossed about ₹72.50 crores worldwide.

== Plot ==
Aruvipurathu Jose alias Turbo Jose, a jeep driver from Idukki with a habit of getting involved in fights, learns that his best friend Jerry, a bank manager in Chennai, was attacked by henchmen sent by the family of his girlfriend Indulekha, who is also a bank manager of a different bank. Jose arrives at Indulekha's house and stops her engagement, taking her to Jerry's house. However, Jerry refuses to accept Indulekha due to the fear of his family and she goes back to Chennai for her job.

Jose learns that Indulekha's family have filed a case against him, prompting him to leave for Chennai and persuading Indulekha to return home. He decides to stay in Chennai after learning that he will be imprisoned. On Jose's request, Indulekha helps him find a job for Andrew, a rich car dealer, as his bodyguard. Jose manages to reunite Indulekha with her family in the process.

Meanwhile, Jerry gets informed by his colleague, Sithara, that an anonymous person from the bank had used Jerry's passkey to transfer a huge amount of money to inactive accounts registered under other people's names. Jerry begins the investigation with Sithara, where he learns about the real mastermind behind the scam: Vetrivel Shanmugha Sundaram, a ruthless and charismatic kingmaker, who runs a corporate syndicate, aiming to establish his power in Deccan. He has been manipulating the banking system to provide money to the ruling party MLAs in order to shift their loyalties.

Jerry learns that Vetrivel's main bank account is in Indulekha's bank, where he tries to inform and warn Indulekha about the scam, but Indulekha does not listen to him as she has not forgiven his rejection. Vetrivel learns that Jerry has learnt about his scam and soon kills Jerry. Jerry's death is termed as suicide in the autopsy report by Vetrivel. Later, Indulekha and Jose learn about Vetrivel's scam and his involvement in Jerry's death, devastating them both.

Indulekha complains to the police, but the police are under Vetrivel's payroll and try to kill her. However, Jose rescues Indulekha by thrashing the cops and they escape, where a cat-and-mouse-game ensues in which Jose and Indulekha manage to save their families, consisting of Jose's mother, Rosakutty, and Indulekha's sister, Niranjana, with the help of Auto Billa, Andrew, and Dilli Babu. Jose and Indulekha expose Vetrivel's scam and Jose kills Vetrivel using a fish-slicing machine at his fishery factory, thus avenging Jerry's death.

in a post-credit scene, Jose, Indulekha, Rosakutty and Niranjana return to Idukki. They receive a parcel containing Andrew's severed head with a letter sent by Vetrivel's friend and business partner, who plans to wage a war against Jose for Vetrivel's death.

== Cast ==
- Mammootty as Aruvipurathu "Turbo" Jose
- Raj B. Shetty as Vetrivel Shanmugha Sundaram, a ruthless gangster who runs a corporate syndicate
- Kabir Duhan Singh as Vincent, Vetrivel's business partner
- Sunil as Auto Billa, Jose's friend
- Shabareesh Varma as Jerry Mathew, Jose's friend and a bank manager in Chennai who gets trapped in Vetrivel's syndicate
- Anjana Jayaprakash as Indulekha S. Nair, Jerry's love interest
- Niranjana Anoop as Sithara, Jerry's friend
- Bindu Panicker as Aruvippurathu Rosakutty, Jose's mother
- Dileesh Pothan as Andrews, a Chennai-based businessman
- Abu Salim as Salim, Andrews's bodyguard and driver
- Amina Nijam as Niranjana, Indulekha's sister
- Nishanth Sagar as Nikhil, Indulekha's brother
- Johny Antony as Vakkachan
- Namo Narayanan as Dilli Babu
- Basil Paulose as Tamil Nadu DCP Sukumar IPS
- Saravanan as Tamil Nadu Chief Minister Shankara Swamy Arunagaram
- VTV Ganesh as Minister Arivazhagan Chella Durai
- Aruldoss as Tamil Nadu CI Shakthivel
- Roshan Chandra as Jerry's elder brother
- Adarsh Sukumaran as Rajesh, Jose and Jerry's friend
- Prasanth Alexander as Kattapana Police Station CI Davis George
- Abin Bino as Sijo, Jose's friend
- Kottayam Ramesh as Mathew "Mathukutty", Jerry's father
- Spadikam Sunny as Indulekha's uncle
- Kunchan as Seban
- Mani Shornur as Fr. Thomas
- P R Rajasekharan as Tea shop owner
- Vineeth Thattil David as Arival Sabu
- Sandhya Manoj as employee at Vetrivel's company
- Manjula Mohandas as Reporter Yamini
- Besant Ravi as Vettu Mani
- Manju Satheesh as Susy, Jerry's mother
- Jayanthi as Indulekha's mother
- Divya Nair as Geetha, Sukumar's wife
- Jess Sweejan as Shivani, Sukumar's daughter
- Deepa Balu as Kaveri
- Sruthy Suresh as Nurse
- Ajit Koshy as Tamil Nadu Police SI Gunasekharan
- Supergood Subramani as Tamil Nadu Police SI Maarimuthu
- Vijay Sethupathi as Vetrivel's friend and business partner (post-credits; voice role)

== Production ==
=== Development ===
The film was officially announced on 24 October 2023, titled Turbo as the fifth production venture under Mammootty's banner Mammootty Kampany. Turbo marks Vysakh's third film with Mammootty after their successful collaboration of Pokkiri Raja (2010) and Madhura Raja (2019). This is the fifth film for Mammootty's home banner, following Rorschach (2022) Nanpakal Nerathu Mayakkam (2022), Kaathal - The Core (2023) and Kannur Squad (2023). The film is written by Midhun Manuel Thomas reuniting with Mammootty after Abraham Ozler (2024).

The film will be edited by Shameer Muhammed while cinematography would be done by Vishnu Sarma. The action director would be Phoenix Prabhu. There were reports that Turbo would be a sequel of Mammootty's action comedy film Kottayam Kunjachan (1990) and the film would be titled Adi Pidi Jose. However, Mammootty in an interview with Asianet News said that it is not the title of the film and neither it has any connection with Kottayam Kunjachan. Justin Varghese was the composer during the announcement, but he was replaced by Christo Xavier. Wayfarer Films would distribute the film in India.

=== Casting ===
Anjana Jayaprakash was cast as the female lead in the film who takes on the role of Indulekha. The film would focus around her character. In November 2023, Kannada actor Raj B Shetty was cast to feature an antagonist role in the film marking his debut in Malayalam cinema. Telugu actor Sunil was cast in his Malayalam cinema debut. In May 2024, Kabir Duhan Singh was announced to be part of the cast. The cast of the film also includes Shabareesh Varma, Dileesh Pothan, Bindu Panicker, Amina Nijam, and Niranjana Anoop among others.

=== Filming ===
The principal photography commenced in October 2023 on the occasion of Vijayadashami and was planned for a shot of 100 days. Initial filming took place in Coimbatore. Mammootty joined the shoot on November 3, 2023. The shooting was shifted to the scenic locales of Idukki in December 2023. The final schedule happened in Chennai. The filming was wrapped up on 18 February 2024. Turbo was made on a budget of around ₹70 crore.

== Music ==
Initially, Justin Varghese was signed in for the music and background score for the film. Later, some schedule issues led to the signing of Christo Xavier as the music and the score composer. The lyrics was written by Vinayak Sasikumar, Vaisakh Sugunan and SVDP. The track "Turbo Trailer Theme", which released on 12 May 2024. The first single "Burnout The Engine" was released on 29 May 2024. The second single "Maayika Maname" was released on 5 June 2024.

Track listing
No.	Title	Lyrics	Singer(s)	Length
1.	"Turbo Trailer Theme"	Vaisakh Sugunan	Arjun Ashokan; Christo Xavier	2:14
2.	"Burnout The Engine"	SVDP	SVDP	2:43
3.	"Maayika Maname"	Vinayak Sasikumar	Sooraj Santhosh	3:13

== Release ==
=== Theatrical ===
Turbo was released on 23 May 2024.

=== Home media ===
The digital streaming and satellite rights were bought by SonyLIV and Zee Keralam. The film was premiered in Sony LIV on 9 August 2024.

== Reception ==
=== Box office ===
On its opening day Turbo earned ₹6.25 crore from Kerala (highest first-day gross in Kerala in 2024 surpassing The Goat Life) becoming the third highest opening day for a Malayalam film in Kerala, behind Marakkar and Odiyan. Domestically it grossed ₹7.40 crore on the first day. Opening day worldwide gross was ₹16.25 crore. By the second day, the film grossed ₹12 crore in India of which ₹10.25 crore coming from Kerala and ₹14.50 crore from overseas to a total of ₹26.50 crore worldwide. By May 28, 2024, it grossed ₹24 crore in India and ₹25 crore in overseas to a worldwide gross of ₹49 crore. In its first week, the film grossed ₹58 crore worldwide, with ₹29.5 crore from India and ₹28.5 crore from overseas. The film ended its box office run by earning ₹72.50 crore worldwide.

=== Critical response ===
Turbo received mixed reviews from critics.

Anna Mathews of The Times of India gave 4/5 stars and wrote "Mammootty, like Malayalam cinema, is at an energetic high. There is a clue about a part two and this is a sequel that audiences will be waiting for." Goutham S of Pinkvilla gave 3.5/5 stars and wrote "The 2-and-a-half-hour flick would surely satisfy many movie lovers who are craving an out-and-out action movie. On a side note, for anyone who is a fan of Jawan or Tamil cinema in particular, make sure to stick around for the tail-end for a surprise, potentially leading to a sequel."

Sanjith Sidhardhan of OTTplay gave 3/5 stars and wrote "Mammootty aces the five action scenes in Vysakh's directorial, but it doesn't rise above that. The generic script and a weak villain robs Turbo off the power to deliver a knockout punch." Janani K of India Today gave 2.5/5 stars and wrote "'Turbo' is a predictable action drama with a few quirks in the bag that make it a watchable affair."

Arjun Menon of Rediff rated 2.5/5 stars and wrote "While Turbo may not break new ground, it serves as a testament to Mammootty's unwavering allure, captivating audiences across generations." Anandu Suresh of The New Indian Express rated 2/5 stars and wrote "Even as the script drags on endlessly, Vysakh's movie is predominantly salvaged by Mammootty's no-holds-barred performance, operating in top gear, complemented by Raj B Shetty's remarkable presence as the villain."

Latha Srinivasan of Hindustan Times wrote "The movie uses an interplay of comedy and fights to move from one situation to the next. Unfortunately, most of the comedy falls flat so it's up to the fight sequences to save the day". S. R. Praveen of The Hindu wrote "Vysakh's ‘Turbo’ will be remembered for recycling all the old tropes that have been part of its genre since time immemorial and for its reluctance to try anything new."

Lakshmi Priya of The News Minute wrote, "Credit to the stunt and VFX teams and to cinematographer Vishnu Sharma, some of the stunt and chase sequences in Turbo are exhilarating, with Mammootty once again in his element as an action hero. Despite the occasional letdowns, the music and background score by Christo Xavier also live up to the film's energy for the most part, amping up the thrills that the stunts seek to deliver." Arjun Menon of Film Companion wrote, "The action entertainer holds much promise through its leading man's charisma but the meandering writing fails to impress. "
