= Rahul Sadasivan =

Indian filmmaker (born 1986)

- Rahul in 2024
- Born: 7 December 1986 (age 39); Palakkad, Kerala, India
- Education: London Film Academy; University of South Wales
- Occupation: Filmmaker
- Years active: 2013–present

Rahul Sadasivan is an Indian filmmaker and screenwriter who works in Malayalam cinema. He is an auteur of folk horror films and a prominent figure in modern Indian horror cinema.

== Early life ==
Rahul was born in Palakkad, Kerala, India. He completed his schooling from Kendriya Vidyalaya, Kanjikode. He studied filmmaking from London Film Academy, and went on to complete his master's degree in animation and VFX from University of South Wales.

== Career ==
Rahul made his directorial debut soon after his London Film Academy course with Red Rain (2013), a science fiction film based on the red rain phenomenon in Kerala. While the film was lauded by genre fans, it did not achieve mainstream success. Rahul's sophomore film, Bhoothakaalam (2022), came 9 years later, in a direct to streaming release on SonyLIV. It helped the horror film gain national attention and was widely praised for its atmospheric treatment and complex themes. His third film, Bramayugam (2024), a big-budget period horror was produced by Night Shift Studios, a film production company exclusively created to produce horror-thriller features. The film gained pre-release attention due to star Mammootty's negative role and Rahul's choice to present the film wholly in black-and-white. It was well received by critics and became a box-office success upon release. Mammootty won the Kerala State Film Award for the Best Actor for his performance in the movie.

== Filmography ==
Year	Title	Director	Story	Screenplay	Notes	Remarks
2013	Red Rain	Yes	Yes	Yes	Debut film	
2022	Bhoothakaalam	Yes	Yes	Yes	OTT release	
2024	Bramayugam	Yes	Yes	Yes	Filmfare Award for Best Director – Malayalam	
2025	Diés Iraé	Yes	Yes	Yes		
2027	Odiyan: The Age of Illusion †	Yes	Yes	Yes		

== Accolades ==
Year	Award	Category	Recipient	Result	Notes	Ref.
2026	Filmfare Awards South	Best Director —Malayalam	Bramayugam	Won		
