= Bramayugam =

2024 Indian horror film by Rahul Sadasivan

- Theatrical release poster
- Directed by: Rahul Sadasivan
- Written by: Rahul Sadasivan
- Dialogues by: T. D. Ramakrishnan
- Produced by: Chakravarthy Ramachandra; S. Sashikanth
- Starring: Mammootty; Arjun Ashokan; Sidharth Bharathan
- Cinematography: Shehnad Jalal
- Edited by: Shafique Mohamed Ali
- Music by: Christo Xavier
- Production companies: YNOT Studios; Night Shift Studios
- Distributed by: Aan Mega Media (Kerala); Sithara Entertainments (Andhra Pradesh) and (Telangana); AP International (Rest of India); Truth Global Films (Overseas)
- Release date: 15 February 2024
- Running time: 139 minutes
- Country: India
- Language: Malayalam
- Budget: ₹27.73 crore
- Box office: est.₹60 - 85 crore

Bramayugam (transl. The Era of Madness) is a 2024 Indian Malayalam-language period folk horror film written and directed by Rahul Sadasivan and jointly produced by YNOT Studios and Night Shift Studios. The film stars Mammootty, Arjun Ashokan and Sidharth Bharathan. It contains elements of sacred mystery, myth and folklore of Kerala.

Bramayugam was released on 15 February 2024 in black-and-white format. It received positive reviews from critics with praise for the cast performances, cinematography, music and production design. The film was a box office success and became one of the highest grossing Malayalam films of 2024. Mammootty won seventh Kerala State Film Award for Best Actor and a fourth National Film Award for Best Actor for his performance as Kodumon Potti in the film.

In 2026, Bramayugam was selected for a special screening at the Academy Museum of Motion Pictures in Los Angeles on February 12, as part of the: Where the Forest Meets the Sea (series). It was the first film starring Mammootty to be shown at the Academy Museum, drawing international attention to the film's global exhibition.

== Plot ==
In 17th century South Malabar, Thevan and Koran arrive at an unfamiliar, forested area and camp there for the night. During the night, Koran is seduced and killed by a yakshi. Thevan runs away, discovering a ramshackle mana in the morning. While trying to crack open a coconut to stave off starvation, he is found by the house's cook. He is brought before the aged lord of the mana, Kodumon Potti, who asks his whereabouts and upon learning he is a paanan (folk singer), requests him to sing for him.

Potti compliments Thevan on the song and insists that he stay in the mana for the rest of his life, despite his desire to leave. The cook, while showing Thevan his room, discourages him from asking questions about the house or investigating any areas that are off-limits. Over the next few days, he discovers from the cook that the Potti is a descendant of the sorcerer Chudalan Potti, who was gifted a mystical goblin helper, a chathan, by the goddess Varahi. His constant torture of the chathan turned it vengeful, and it went on to kill Chudalan Potti and his family. Kodumon Potti, a strong sorcerer in his own right eventually defeated the Chathan and chained him in the mansion's attic. He also realises that the cook is not on good terms with Kodumon Potti, and that the latter is not a devotee of God. Thevan befriends the cook, who soon appears to confide in him and warns him not to trust Kodumon. It is also revealed that there was a singer staying in the mansion before Thevan arrived, who was killed and buried in the backyard as he went insane.

One day, Thevan sees the cook digging a grave in the backyard, presumably for himself. Terrified, he tries to leave, but is unable to, held back by a spell that makes him sick whenever he tries to cross the gateway, despite begging Kodumon who refuses to let him leave. He then realizes that he is losing his memory, unable to recall even his own name or when he arrived at the mansion. The cook tells Thevan that the grave is not meant for him, but for the real Potti whose corpse is lying upstairs and is then buried. Thevan had come to the realization that the Potti downstairs is in fact the chathan in disguise, who imprisoned the real Potti in the attic and drove him insane, leading to his eventual death. The only way that the cook and Thevan could escape the manor is by defeating the chathan by extinguishing an ever-burning lamp located in a secret chamber in the granary, and then trapping it in a special chest.

During an argument with the impersonator Potti, the cook steals the key to the chamber from Potti's waist. He opens the chamber and blows out the lamp, weakening the chathan. Thevan and the cook then fight the chathan. The cook, now revealed to be Potti's illicit son, grabs the ring and sets the chathan on fire, causing the creature inside to emerge. As the rightful heir to the ring, the cook attempts to put it on, which would legitimize his ownership over the chathan, but is stopped by Thevan, who believes that the ring's power will corrupt him or any human being who wears it. The two start fighting while the fire destroys the mana, causing it to collapse over them.

Thevan is shown walking away from the ruins of the mana but is attacked by the cook. During the struggle the cook realizes that he is not the real Thevan, but the chathan in disguise. The real Thevan is then shown to have presumably died from the collapse of the mana. Terrified, the cook runs away into the forest and comes across an imperial Portuguese soldier while crossing the river. He tries to attack the soldier but is gunned down. A platoon of Portuguese soldiers emerge from the forest, cross the river, and march towards the direction of the mana, while the chathan in Thevan's body is seen leaving the area, wearing the ring.

== Cast ==
- Mammootty as Kodumon Potti / Chathan
  - Akash Chandran as Chathan’s true form
    - Rafnas Rafeek as Chathan’s theyyam form
- Arjun Ashokan as Thevan / Chathan, a paanan (folk singer)
- Sidharth Bharathan as The cook and Potti's illicit son
- Amalda Liz as Yakshi
- Manikandan R. Achari as Koran, Thevan's friend

== Production ==
=== Development ===
In August 2023, it was reported that Mammootty and Arjun Ashokan were collaborating for a horror thriller film. The film is directed by Rahul Sadasivan. On 17 August 2023, Mammootty shared a poster featuring a haunted mansion and revealed that the shooting for the film had begun.

Titled Bramayugam, the film was launched on the occasion of Chingam 1. Chakravarthy Ramachandra launched a production house exclusively for horror films, Night Shift Studios, debuting with Bramayugam. The film was scripted by Rahul Sadasivan and novelist T. D. Ramakrishnan penned the dialogues. At the launch of the film, Sadasivan noted that the story is "rooted in the dark ages of Kerala".

Shehnad Jalal was announced as the cinematographer and Christo Xavier as the music director, while Jothish Shankar worked on the film as a production designer.

Sadasivan revealed that he wrote Bramayugam before Bhoothakalam during the COVID lockdown, and it took him eight months to complete it. T. D. Ramakrishnan helped him develop the script and make the dialogue nuanced to fit the period the story is set in. As the film is set in the 17th century and being a period film, he conceived it in black-and-white format.

=== Casting ===
Cast members announced during the film's launch included Arjun Ashokan, Sidharth Bharathan and Amalda Liz. Reportedly, Mammootty takes on the role of the antagonist, who allocated 30 days to the film, while Arjun Ashokan portrays the protagonist with 60 days allocated for the film. In September 2023, Makers revealed a special first look poster of Mammootty on his birthday and as per reports he will be playing a character who practices black magic in the film.

=== Filming ===
Principal photography for the project began on 17 August 2023, coinciding with the first day of the Kerala New Year. The shoot started at Kochi's MJI Studios with a customary pooja ceremony. The film was shot across various cities in Kerala including Ottapalam, Athirapally and Kochi. Mammootty finished shooting his portions by 16 September. The filming wrapped on 18 October 2023.

== Music ==
The music for the film was composed by Christo Xavier. Din Nath Puthenchery and Ammu Maria Alex have penned the lyrics.

== Marketing ==
The first look of Mammootty from Bramayugam was released on the actor's birthday, featuring a sinister monochrome image. The trailer of the film was released on 10 February 2024, at a grand event held in Abu Dhabi.

== Release ==
=== Theatrical ===
The film theatrically released on 15 February 2024 in Black and White format. The dubbed versions of the film in Hindi, Tamil, Telugu, and Kannada was released on 23 February 2024.

=== Home media ===
The film premiered on SonyLIV from 15 March 2024. The satellite rights of the film are acquired by Asianet and premiered on 30 March 2025.

== Reception ==
=== Critical response ===
Bramayugam received highly positive reviews from critics especially for the cast, production design, background score, sound design and cinematography.

Akshay P. R. of DT Next rated 4 out of 5 and wrote, "Director Rahul Sadasivan is yet again exploring the haunted mansion theme but is quite different from his previous film 'Bhoothakalam' as it was more of dealing with our own past, but Bramayugam (The Age of Madness) is more of a black and white film, in the horror-thriller genre to explore the power pattern in history." Anandu Suresh of The Indian Express described Bramayugam as Malayalam's "horror cinema peaked here" moment. He lauded Mammootty's performance, in particular, noting, "While he has consistently displayed brilliance in portraying grey characters, with Baskara Pattelar in Vidheyan (1994) and Kuttan in Puzhu (2022) being prime examples, Mammootty surpasses himself in Bramayugam, exuding darkness like never before. Even at this age and stage in his career, he doesn't hold back in even the most disturbing scenes in the film, going all in and extracting the best from himself to elevate the movie. His sharp and measured dialogue delivery, along with the malevolence he exudes through subtle glances and smirks, further enhances the brilliance of Bramayugam."

Sanjith Sidhardhan of OTTplay rated 3.5 out of 5 and reviewed, "Mammootty's Bramayugam benefits richly from its engaging screenplay, cinematography and performances, which makes the viewer forget that it's a black-and-white film and lets you enjoy the magic of cinema."

Reviewing for The News Minute, Sukanya Shaji stated, "The heart of this monochrome horror thriller is, of course, Mammootty. Even as Potti makes your stomach churn in disgust, Mammootty makes you want to clap for his versatility as a performer. Arjun Ashokan and Sidharth Bharathan perhaps have more screen time than Mammootty, and make good use of it, though some scenes make you think that the characters could have benefitted from the experienced craft of more seasoned actors."

The New Indian Express' Vignesh Madhu rated 3.5/5 and reviewed, "While Bhoothakaalam saw Rahul expertly handling psychology and supernatural elements, he blends folklore and horror in Bramayugam to create a terrifying atmosphere where almost every moment is an event.

Nirmal Jovial from The Week rated 4 out of 5 and verdicted, "Bramayugam has a major reliance on visual storytelling, but its memorability isn't derived from visual gimmicks or jump scares. Instead, it's the intricate world-building orchestrated by Sadasivan, with significant support from Ramakrishnan, within a confined yet evocative setting, that truly captivated this reviewer."

Firstpost rated 3/5 and reviewed, "What really drives the film home is the performance by the lead actors. Mammootty is going all out with his out of box choices because this is probably the most sinister, and terrifying character that I have seen him portray. Everything about this film is experiential. Starting from the dark insides of the theaters to the sound and music in the film. It is ethereal how the beautifully all aspects of the film come together to achieve this feat.

Janani K. of India Today rated the film 3/5 and said, "‘Bramayugam’, with an intriguing story, gifts you an immersive experience. And Mammootty strikes yet again".

Deccan Herald's Arun Antony rated 4/5 and reviewed, "Arjun Ashokan surprises as the paanan but Siddharth Bharathan stands out as the cook. Overall ‘Bramayugam’ makes a lasting impression and anyone who is a fan of ‘Tumbbad’ should watch it".

Anna Mathews of The Times of India rated 3.5/5 and wrote, "The script, the direction and art direction cultivates the eerieness and makes the film scary. But the story with bits of class politics and religious philosophy sometimes lacks a flow and does not make things very clear."

Reviewing for Onmanorama, Swathi P. Ajith wrote, "The film seamlessly merges horror, thriller, and folktale elements, with horror subtly woven into the shadows and sounds. Rather than relying on jump scares, the movie crafts a claustrophobic atmosphere, gradually building a sense of terror." Analysing the film for Onmanorama, Sajesh Mohan wrote about the power politics depicted in the movie, "Rahul's 'Bramayugam' and Jijo's 'My Dear Kuttichathan' depict the manipulation tactics of power-hungry people who ensnare gods and demigods like Chathan, Karinkali, Yakshi, etc., exploiting their vulnerabilities to instil fear and exert control over fellow beings."

=== Box office ===
The film collected ₹3 crore in Kerala on its opening day and grossed over ₹32 crores globally in the first weekend. In the next three days crossed ₹46 crores at the box office. On eleventh day, the film entered the ₹50 crores club. The Times of India reported that the film grossed a worldwide collection of ₹52.2 crores and overseas collection stood at ₹24 crores in fifteen days.

== Awards and honours ==
Year	Award	Category	Recipient(s)	Ref.
2024	13th SIIMA Awards	Best Cinematographer	Shehnad Jalal	
2024	Kerala State Film Awards	Best Actor	Mammootty	
2024	Kerala State Film Awards	Best Character Actor	Sidharth Bharathan	
2024	Kerala State Film Awards	Best Music Director – Score	Christo Xavier	
2024	Kerala State Film Awards	Best Makeup Artist	Ronex Xavier	
2026	70th Filmfare Awards South	Best Actor	Mammootty	
2026	70th Filmfare Awards South	Best Director	Rahul Sadasivan	
2026	72nd National Film Awards	Best Actor in a Leading Role	Mammootty	
2026	72nd National Film Awards	Best Cinematography	Shehnad Jalal	

=== Other Awards, recognition and nominations ===
- It was featured at the 55th IFFI Indian panorama section.
- It was featured at the IFFK 2024 International Film Festival of Kerala.
- It was featured at the Göteborg Film Festival 2025 Gothenburg Film Festival 2025.
- Nominated for Imagine Film Festival The Sea Devil section for The Best Fantastic Feature Film 2024.
- It was ranked as the second-best horror film of 2024 on Letterboxd.
