= YNOT Studios =

Indian film production company

- Type: Private
- Industry: Entertainment; Motion picture
- Founded: January 29, 2010; 16 years ago
- Headquarters: Chennai, Tamil Nadu, India
- Area served: Worldwide
- Key people: S. Sashikanth (founder); Chakravarthy Ramachandra (CEO)
- Products: Film production; Film distribution
- Subsidiaries: YNOT X; YNOT Music
- Website: YNOT Studios

YNOT Studios (stylised as Y?NOT) is an Indian film production company in Chennai, Tamil Nadu, established by producer S. Sashikanth. As of 2023, the company has produced 21 feature films, which includes productions made in the Tamil, Telugu, Malayalam and Hindi film industries of India. It has collaborated with filmmakers including Sudha Kongara, Balaji Mohan, Pushkar–Gayathri, Karthik Subbaraj and Rahul Sadasivan.

YNOT Studios' first release was Tamil cinema's first parody film Tamizh Padam (2010), which featured a predominantly new technical crew and a rookie star cast. The film became a commercial success and the first of many "new-wave cinema" projects that the company chose to specialise in. Subsequent successful ventures included Balaji Mohan's romantic comedy films Kadhalil Sodhappuvadhu Yeppadi (2013) and Vaayai Moodi Pesavum (2014), which were recognised by critics for their innovative narratives. The company also produced Vasanthabalan's period drama Kaaviya Thalaivan (2014), which focused on the competition between two theatre artistes in the 1930s and had a popular soundtrack composed by A. R. Rahman.

YNOT Studios produced several profitable films from 2016 onwards, with Sudha Kongara's sports drama Irudhi Suttru (2016), being made in three different languages. Many of their following films, Pushkar–Gayathri's crime drama Vikram Vedha (2017), Prasanna's comedy-drama Shubh Mangal Saavdhan (2017), C. S. Amudhan's Tamizh Padam 2 (2018) and Ashwin Saravanan's psychological thriller Game Over (2019) were commercial successes. It also has produced the Malayalam horror thriller films Bramayugam and Diés Iraé, both directed by Rahul Sadasivan, which both became highly profitable.

== History ==
=== 2010–2015 ===
YNOT Studios was created by Chennai-based architect and entrepreneur S. Sashikanth in 2009. Having previously worked in films as an assistant art director, Sashikanth remained in contact with film personalities through his architectural work and became a close acquaintance of ad filmmaker C. S. Amudhan and cinematographer Nirav Shah. Looking to make his directorial debut, Amudhan pitched film scripts in three genres for YNOT Studios: a road film, a period film and a spoof film, with the latter, later materialising as the studio's first film, Tamizh Padam (2010), Tamil cinema's first spoof film.

Featuring a relatively new technical crew and a rookie cast led by Shiva, Sashikanth opted to sell the film to Dayanidhi Azhagiri's Cloud Nine Movies to ensure it received a wide release. Told in satirical fashion spoofing popular Tamil films and celebrities, the film narrated the tale of a young man looking to reunite with his long-lost family while tackling the criminalities of a notorious gangster. Upon release, the film received critical acclaim en route to becoming one of the box office successes of the year in Tamil Nadu. Rediff.com called the film a "must watch", while Sify.com labelled the film as a "rollicking comedy" and gave particular praise for Shiva's performance and the director's script and dialogues. The studio's next film, Va (2010) by director duo Pushkar–Gayathri, earned positive reviews but did not perform well at the box office. Telling the tale of a man hunting for liquor on a dry day in Chennai before leaving to Saudi Arabia, the film was completely shot within the city and was again distributed with the assistance of Cloud Nine Movies.

The studio next produced Balaji Mohan's Kadhalil Sodhappuvadhu Yeppadi (2012), which was simultaneously made in Telugu as Love Failure (2012), and both films opened to critical and commercial acclaim. After being impressed with a short film version released on YouTube by Balaji, Sashikanth approached him and opted to co-produce a full-length feature of the script along with the film's lead actor Siddharth. In their review of the film, Rediff.com praised the team's innovative style of film-making noting that "the story is told in a slightly new format" and that "the script is simple yet meaningful".

The success of their first collaboration prompted YNOT Studios to produce Balaji's next bilingual project, the comedy-drama Vaayai Moodi Pesavum (2014) starring Dulquer Salmaan and Nazriya in the lead roles, which was shot in Tamil and Malayalam. The film narrated the tale of a fictional hill station that is hit with a virus that causes people to lose the power of speech, with the second half of the film being predominantly a silent film. The film also opened to positive reviews, with a critic from Rediff.com writing it was "a totally new concept coupled with the director's unique narrative style and a screenplay loaded with satire and comedy, that makes Vaayai Moodi Pesavum, a thought-provoking and thoroughly enjoyable film", concluding it was "definitely a must watch". After the release of the film, Behindwoods.com remarked that YNOT Studios regularly "associated themselves with gutsy new-wave cinema".

The company's next release was Vasanthabalan's historical drama Kaaviya Thalaivan (2014), which narrated the tale of two stage actors who compete for roles, love, and the future of India during its quest for independence. Starring Prithviraj Sukumaran and Siddharth, with music composed by A. R. Rahman, it became YNOT Studios' biggest production to date. Kaaviya Thalaivan was announced in September 2012 and research work for the final script was carried out for nearly a year wherein facts, references and whereabouts were collected from veteran theatre artists across Tamil Nadu. Vasanthabalan was inspired to write the film's script after discovering more about Tamil stage actors from the 1930s and adapted real-life events from the lives of T. K. Shanmugam, K. B. Sundarambal, and S. G. Kittappa. Filming took a further year before it had a theatrical release in November 2014. Despite opening to positive reviews and winning critical acclaim, it performed poorly at the box office, with trade pundits blaming the time of release. Notwithstanding its relatively modest commercial performance, the film later won ten Tamil Nadu State Film Awards for 2014, including awards for Best Actor, Best Music Director and Best Cinematography.

=== 2016–2019 ===
From 2016 onwards, YNOT Studios continued to contribute towards making "new wave films" in the Tamil film industry and experienced commercial success. The company collaborated with the director Sudha Kongara, actor Madhavan, and debutante actress Ritika Singh to produce a bilingual sports drama film titled Irudhi Suttru (2016) in Tamil and Saala Khadoos (2016) in Hindi, which told the story of a boorish boxing coach taking on a rebellious young woman from a fishermen colony as his new student. With a publicity budget of 9 crore rupees, the promotions for the films were described by The Hindu to be "unlike other film promotions in the South", considering that most film teams in the Tamil film industry do not usually tour around the state publicising their project. Before the release of the film, the team held several screenings to select Hindi and Tamil audiences and edited the film accordingly to the taste of the audiences. Irudhi Suttru opened to positive reviews, with a critic from Sify.com stating that the film was "a perfect sports drama, which should not be missed" and added that "this inspirational effort has a superb screenplay with all the typical elements of a good sports film in place", while Rediff.com agreed that the film was "not to be missed", adding "its refreshing characters, enjoyable plot, great music and visuals keeps you hooked". Following the success of the film, Sudha Kongara remade the film in the Telugu language as Guru (2017) with Venkatesh in the lead role alongside Ritika Singh.

Irudhi Suttru was later screened at the 29th Tokyo International Film Festival during October 2016 and was then also selected to be a part of the Indian Panorama section at 47th International Film Festival of India. It went on to win a National Film Award for Ritika Singh; three Filmfare Awards for Best Director, Actor and Actress; as well as Best Picture at the South Indian International Movie Awards and the IIFA Utsavam.

YNOT Studios' next release was the crime drama Vikram Vedha (2017), where they collaborated again with duo Pushkar–Gayathri. Having been in talks with the duo since their previous joint venture in 2010, Sashikanth confirmed that pre-production work was ongoing by early 2015 and revealed that the film would tell the tale of an encounter cop and his pursuit of a gangster. The directors revealed that the story for the film was inspired by the Indian meta-folktale Baital Pachisi (Vedhala Kadhai in Tamil), with the characterisation of King Vikramadithyan and the celestial spirit Vedhalam derived from that plot. Actors Madhavan and Vijay Sethupathi were signed to portray titular characters, with filming beginning in November 2016 and progressing for five months.

Vikram Vedha opened to positive reviews from critics and audiences, with critic Manoj Kumar of The Indian Express labelling it as "by far the best film to release in Tamil this year so far" adding readers "not to miss the film". The Hindustan Times's Karthik Kumar called it "a film to remember", "a must watch" and "path-breaking", while adding "not only is the film entertaining from start to finish, it's equally engaging and it succeeds in piquing the intellect of audiences like no recent Tamil film". The film was a commercial success, becoming the second highest grossing Tamil film of the year after Baahubali 2 (2017) at the time of its release. Made at a budget of 11 crore rupees, the film grossed ten crores in Tamil Nadu alone within the first weekend, earning seventeen crores worldwide. Within a week of its release, the film had grossed over forty crores worldwide and performed especially well in the United States.

YNOT Studios achieved further commercial success with R. S. Prasanna's Hindi comedy-drama Shubh Mangal Saavdhan (2017), which was co-produced in association with Colour Yellow Productions and Eros International. A remake of the successful Tamil film Kalyana Samayal Saadham (2013), the film narrates the story of an arranged marriage which becomes threatened by the groom's potential erectile dysfunction and stars Ayushmann Khurrana and Bhumi Pednekar. The company had earlier planned to produce the film in Hindi during 2014 with Thirukumaran Entertainment and Abi & Abi Pictures, but problems with casting meant that production was postponed and the film was later sold to different production houses. The film opened in September 2017. Critics praised the screenwriting and the approach the filmmaker took in subtly narrating a taboo subject with humour. At the box office, the film outperformed other high-profile films released during the same period.

In late July 2017, YNOT Studios announced that they had begun production work on Tamizh Padam 2 by C. S. Amudhan, which would be a sequel to their first production. Sashikanth had requested Amudhan to work on the film during November 2016, following which the director completed the scripting process. The film opened to positive response and was a commercially successful venture. Their next project titled Game Over, starred Taapsee Pannu, for whose the film marked the actor's return to Tamil cinema after four years. Directed by Ashwin Saravanan, the film opened to rave reviews and also achieved commercial success.

=== 2020–present ===
As the company approached its tenth anniversary, YNOT Studios announced a collaboration with Reliance Entertainment to co-produce several of their upcoming projects and further announced their subsidiaries: its distribution arm, YNOT X and the music label YNOT Music. Since 2020, the company has regularly alternated between producing high-budget projects featuring leading actors and technical crew, and making small-budget content-driven films featuring relative newcomers.

The studio produced the crime drama Jagame Thandhiram (2021) directed by Karthik Subbaraj, with the shoot primarily taking place across the United Kingdom. Featuring Dhanush and James Cosmo in leading roles, the film narrated the tale of a carefree gangster in Madurai who is recruited to help an overseas crime lord take down a rival. The film's release was delayed due to the COVID-19 pandemic, before Sashikanth opted in favour of a direct-to-digital release through the streaming platform Netflix. In a further large-budget venture, YNOT Studios collaborated with Pushkar–Gayathri to remake the duo's 2017 Tamil film into Hindi with the same title of Vikram Vedha (2022). Featuring an ensemble cast led by Hrithik Roshan, Saif Ali Khan and Radhika Apte, the film recorded one of the widest releases for a Hindi film of all time. The film opened to positive reviews from critics and audiences in September 2022.

In the early 2020s, YNOT Studios simultaneously worked on producing a number of smaller ventures with "off-beat" scripts including Halitha Shameem's Aelay (2021), Madonne Ashwin's Mandela (2021), Nishanth Kalidindi's Kadaseela Biriyani (2021) and Jayaprakash Radhakrishnan's Thalaikoothal (2023). All four films opened to positive reviews from critics, with Mandela proceeding to win two National Film Awards and several Best Film nominations at award ceremonies.

== Filmography ==
=== Production ===
†	Denotes films that have not yet been released

Year	Language	Film	Actors	Director(s)	Ref(s)
2010	Tamil	Tamizh Padam	Shiva, Disha Pandey	C. S. Amudhan	(Note: The film was co-produced with Cloud Nine Movies.)
2010	Tamil	Va	Shiva, Lekha Washington, Charan Sripathi	Pushkar–Gayathri	
2012	Tamil; Telugu	Kadhalil Sodhappuvadhu Yeppadi	Siddharth, Amala Paul	Balaji Mohan	(Note: The film was co-produced with Etaki Entertainment.)
2014	Tamil; Malayalam	Vaayai Moodi Pesavum; Samsaaram Aarogyathinu Haanikaram	Dulquer Salmaan, Nazriya	Balaji Mohan	(Note: The film was co-produced with Radiance Media Group.)
2014	Tamil	Kaaviya Thalaivan	Prithviraj Sukumaran, Siddharth, Vedhika, Anaika Soti	Vasanthabalan	
2016	Tamil; Hindi	Irudhi Suttru; Saala Khadoos	Madhavan, Ritika Singh, Mumtaz Sorcar	Sudha Kongara	(Note: The film was co-produced with Thirukumaran Entertainment and UTV Motion Pictures.)
2017	Telugu	Guru	Venkatesh, Ritika Singh, Mumtaz Sorcar	Sudha Kongara	
2017	Tamil	Vikram Vedha	Madhavan, Vijay Sethupathi, Shraddha Srinath	Pushkar–Gayathri	
2017	Hindi	Shubh Mangal Saavdhan	Ayushmann Khurrana, Bhumi Pednekar	R. S. Prasanna	(Note: The film was co-produced with Colour Yellow Productions and Eros International.)
2018	Tamil	Tamizh Padam 2	Shiva, Iswarya Menon	C. S. Amudhan	
2019	Tamil; Telugu	Game Over	Taapsee Pannu, Sanchana Natarajan	Ashwin Saravanan	(Note: The film was co-produced with Reliance Entertainment.)
2021	Tamil	Aelay	Samuthirakani, K. Manikandan	Halitha Shameem	(Note: The film was co-produced with Reliance Entertainment and Wallwatcher Films.)
2021	Tamil	Mandela	Yogi Babu, Sheela Rajkumar	Madonne Ashwin	(Note: The film was co-produced with Open Window and Reliance Entertainment.)
2021	Tamil	Jagame Thandhiram	Dhanush, Joju George, Aishwarya Lekshmi, James Cosmo	Karthik Subbaraj	
2021	Tamil	Kadaseela Biriyani	Vijay Ram, Haikim Shah	Nishanth Kalidindi	
2022	Hindi	Vikram Vedha	Hrithik Roshan, Saif Ali Khan, Radhika Apte	Pushkar–Gayathri	(Note: The film was co-produced with Friday Filmworks, Reliance Entertainment, T-Series Films and Jio Studios.)
2023	Tamil	Thalaikoothal	Samuthirakani, Kathir	Jayaprakash Radhakrishnan	
2023	Telugu	Martin Luther King	Sampoornesh Babu, Naresh, Venkatesh Maha	Puja Kolluru	
2024	Malayalam	Bramayugam	Mammotty, Arjun Ashokan, Siddharth Bharathan	Rahul Sadasivan	Malayalam debut
2025	Tamil	Test	R. Madhavan, Siddharth, Nayanthara, Meera Jasmine	S. Sashikanth	
2025	Malayalam	Diés Iraé	Pranav Mohanlal	Rahul Sadasivan	

=== Distribution ===
In addition to the production of films since 2010, YNOT Studios has also been involved in distributing films of other production houses and notably was involved in the theatrical release of Enakkul Oruvan (2015).

The below is a list of films from other production houses distributed by the studio and its subsidiary:

Films distributed under YNOT Studios

- Enakkul Oruvan (2015)

Films distributed under YNOTX Marketing & Distribution

- Super Deluxe (2019)
- Pakkiri (2019)
- K.D. (2019)
- Jada (2019)
- Vaanam Kottattum (2020)
- Kadaseela Biriyani (2021)
- 83 (2021)

=== Music ===
In late 2019, YNOT Studios set up a second subsidiary, YNOT Music, to oversee the release of soundtracks from films. In December 2019, the studio launched the original soundtrack to the film Game Over composed by Ron Ethan Yohann.
