= Chakravarthy Ramachandra =

Indian film producer

- Born: 21 September 1978 (age 48); Anantapur, Andhra Pradesh, India
- Other name: Ram
- Education: Post Graduate Diploma in Film Making
- Alma mater: London Film Academy
- Occupations: Film producer; Entrepreneur
- Years active: 2005–present
- Spouse: Puja Chakravarthy (m. 2013)

Chakravarthy Ramachandra is an Indian film producer who has worked on Hindi, Tamil, Telugu and Malayalam-language films. After beginning his career as an independent producer, he joined YNOT Studios as its CEO.

== Career ==
=== Early career ===
After completing a diploma at the London Film Academy in 2005, Chakravarthy Ramachandra debuted in the film industry as a supporting actor in the Telugu comedy film Mr. Errababu (2005), where he also doubled up as the film's line producer. In December 2005, Ramachandra launched his first production through the Ideaz Production banner, with Shashank and Rajeev Kanakala selected for the lead roles. The project, directed by another debutant named Chakravrathy, was later dropped.

He continued working in the technical crew of Telugu films, notably serving as the line producer in Sukumar's Arya 2 (2009), Walt Disney Pictures's Anaganaga O Dheerudu (2011) and Oosaravelli (2011), and developed his knowledge of film-making. Ramachandra was then set to make his debut as a co-producer with Sukumarudu (2013), but later opted out of the venture. He later set up his own production house, Bad Monkey Productions, to produce the unreleased Telugu and Tamil comedy films Antha Scene Ledu and Nondi Kuthirai (2014) starring Navdeep and Shashank.

=== YNOT Studios ===
Ramachandra first became involved with YNOT Studios during the release of Kadhalil Sodhappuvadhu Yeppadi in Telugu as Love Failure. His work on the film as an executive producer paved the way for him to join YNOT Studios' other projects. After working as the executive producer of Guru (2017) and Vikram Vedha (2017), Ramachandra became the company's chief executive officer and in the late 2010s, he co-produced films such as Tamizh Padam 2 (2018) and Game Over (2019) alongside the studio's founder S. Sashikanth.

As the company approached its tenth anniversary, Ramachandra reversed the company's collaboration with Reliance Entertainment to co-produce several of their projects, and the announcement of their subsidiaries: its distribution arm, YNOT X and the music label YNOT Music. In the early 2020s, the company alternated between producing high-budget projects featuring leading actors and technical crew, and making small-budget content-driven films featuring relative newcomers. Big-budget productions such as Jagame Thandhiram (2021) and the Hindi version of Vikram Vedha (2022), were complemented by a number of smaller ventures with "off-beat" scripts including Halitha Shameem's Aelay (2021), Madonne Ashwin's Mandela (2021), Nishanth Kalidindi's Kadaseela Biriyani (2021) and Jayaprakash Radhakrishnan's Thalaikoothal (2023).

=== Night Shift Studios ===
In 2021, Ramachandra registered Night Shift Studios, a film production company focusing on making horror and thriller films. In August 2023, the studio was formally established and announced its first feature film, Bramayugam (2024). Their next feature film was Diés Iraé (2025).

== Personal life ==
Ramachandra married Pooja in Hyderabad in August 2013.

== Filmography ==
†	Denotes films that have not yet been released

Films produced with YNOT Studios

Year	Film	Language	Credited as	Cast	Director(s)	Ref(s)
2012	Love Failure	Telugu	Executive producer	Siddharth, Amala Paul	Balaji Mohan	
2017	Guru	Telugu	Executive producer	Venkatesh, Ritika Singh, Mumtaz Sorcar	Sudha Kongara	
2017	Vikram Vedha	Tamil	Executive producer	Madhavan, Vijay Sethupathi, Shraddha Srinath	Pushkar–Gayathri	
2018	Tamizh Padam 2	Tamil	Co-producer	Shiva, Iswarya Menon	C. S. Amudhan	(Note: The film was co-produced with S. Sashikanth as a part of YNOT Studios.)
2019	Game Over	Tamil; Telugu	Co-producer	Taapsee Pannu	Ashwin Saravanan	
2021	Aelay	Tamil	Co-producer	Samuthirakani, K. Manikandan	Halitha Shameem	(Note: The film was co-produced with Open Window and Reliance Entertainment.)
2021	Mandela	Tamil	Co-producer	Yogi Babu, Sheela Rajkumar	Madonne Ashwin	
2021	Jagame Thanthiram	Tamil	Co-producer	Dhanush, James Cosmo, Aishwarya Lekshmi	Karthik Subbaraj	
2021	Kadaseela Biriyani	Tamil	Producer	Vijay Ram, Hakim Shahjahan	Nishanth Kalidindi	
2022	Vikram Vedha	Hindi	Co-producer	Hrithik Roshan, Saif Ali Khan, Radhika Apte	Pushkar–Gayathri	(Note: The film was co-produced with Friday Filmworks, Reliance Entertainment, T-Series Films and Jio Studios.)
2023	Thalaikoothal	Tamil	Co-producer	Samuthirakani, Kathir	Jayaprakash Radhakrishnan	
2023	Martin Luther King	Telugu	Co-producer	Sampoornesh Babu, Naresh, Venkatesh Maha	Puja Kolluru	
2025	Test	Tamil	Producer	Madhavan, Nayanthara, Siddharth	S. Sashikanth	

Films produced under Night Shift Studios

Year	Film	Language	Credited as	Cast	Director(s)	Ref(s)
2024	Bramayugam	Malayalam	Producer	Mammootty, Arjun Ashokan, Sidharth Bharathan	Rahul Sadasivan	
2025	Diés Iraé	Malayalam	Producer	Pranav Mohanlal	Rahul Sadasivan	
