= S. Sashikanth =

Indian film producer

- Born: Shivaji Sashikanth; 4 October 1975 (age 50); Chennai, Tamil Nadu, India
- Occupations: Film producer; Architect; Film director; Entrepreneur
- Years active: 2010–present
- Spouse: Rajani (m. 2002)
- Children: 2

Shivaji Sashikanth is an Indian film producer, architect, film director, and entrepreneur from Chennai, Tamil Nadu. After studying architecture at university, Sashikanth established the Chennai-based design firm Space Scape in 2002, which became involved in major projects such as the British Council and other residential and corporate building designs. Sashikanth later shifted to film production through the establishment of a production studio, YNOT Studios, and the 2010 release of his first film, Tamizh Padam.

Sashikanth's stated goal has been to see himself as having a creative role; Behindwoods has characterised him as a producer of "gutsy new-wave cinema", while The Hindu acknowledged his films Tamizh Padam, Va and Kadhalil Sodhappuvadhu Yeppadi as being "three of the most creative films.

== Career ==
=== Architectures ===
Alongside University of Sydney graduate Manoj Kumar, Sashikanth helped co-found the website StudentConcepts.com, which offered a suite of services for students, including loyalty programmes and job search tools. Sashikanth then continued as a student of architecture, but took an extended break from the subject after failing his first thesis. As a result of his interest in filmmaking, he was selected to assist art director Thotta Tharani with his sets on the production of Shankar's political thriller Mudhalvan (1999). After working on the sets for three months, he briefly dabbled in mango farming, before choosing to continue his studies in architecture, which he then passed as the university topper.

Sashikanth subsequently set up an architectural company, Space Scape, with his wife Rajani in 2002. The couple moved into a 400-square-foot (37 m^{2}) apartment in Chennai and spent ₹80,000 to renovate it into a penthouse studio. Sashikanth set up an office in the basement of the apartment building. Their work was awarded the Best Young Architect of the Year award by Indian Architects and Builders magazine. In a short span of time, Space Scape developed into one of Chennai's leading firms and won national recognition for their work on projects including the British Council in Chennai during 2004. Within five years of its establishment, the company grew from five architects to 30 architects working in two cities, and accepted commissions from around India. Sashikanth's clients included Max Müller Bhavan; corporate projects such as Cognizant; and residential projects such as the homes of actors Suriya and Udhayanidhi Stalin, VGP House, and Chettinad House.

=== Filmmaking career ===
After following the production of Dharani's Kuruvi (2008), Sashikanth experienced a renewed interest in filmmaking; he considered starting his own studio, as he was "too old to be an assistant director and never good at taking instructions". Sashikanth expressed interest in the "Hollywood model" of filmmaking, where film producers are seen as those who pitch film projects, as opposed to India, where producers were seen as being the financial backers of projects. He explained that he wanted to be seen as an entrepreneur who can "[create] projects that are able to generate their own money". C. S. Amudhan, a past client of Sashikanth, submitted three pitches in different genres for his consideration. Out of the three pitches, Sashikanth went ahead with Tamizh Padam, a satire of Tamil cinema, and founded YNOT Studios to produce the film—which was sold to the distributor Cloud Nine Movies and premiered in 2010.

After discovering Balaji Mohan's short film Kadhalil Sodhappuvadhu Yeppadi on YouTube, Sashikanth expressed interest in producing a full-length version, which starred Siddharth and was released in 2012 as a multilingual with Tamil and Telugu versions. YNOT Studios handled both production and distribution for the film; Sashikanth argued that there were too many "middlemen" in the film industry, and believed that "the closer the producer is to the audience, the much better the money."

In 2014, Sashikanth partnered with several other Tamil film producers to form a distribution company known as Dream Factory.

He also revealed plans of taking YNOT Studios into Hindi cinema with the release of Saala Khadoos (2016) and the remake of Thiagarajan Kumararaja's Aaranya Kaandam (2011), but the latter did not materialise. He later produced the remake of Vikram Vedha starring Hrithik Roshan and Saif Ali Khan, with T-Series Films, Neeraj Pandey, and JioCinema.

Despite the relative failure of Kaaviya Thalaivan (2014), his productions since 2016 have been profitable.

Sashikanth revealed that he was writing a script for a sport-themed thriller entitled Test, and that he was considering becoming a director in the future. Subsequently, in 2023, he turned director with the same film starring Madhavan, Nayanthara, Siddharth, and Meera Jasmine. The film was release in 2025.

== Filmography ==
=== Director ===
| Year | Title | Language | Notes | Ref |
|---|---|---|---|---|
| 2025 | Test | Tamil | Also producer | |

=== As Producer ===
| Year | Title | Language | Notes |
|---|---|---|---|
| 2010 | Tamizh Padam | Tamil | |
| 2010 | Va | Tamil | |
| 2012 | Kadhalil Sodhappuvadhu Yeppadi | Tamil | |
| 2014 | Vaayai Moodi Pesavum | Tamil | |
| 2014 | Kaaviya Thalaivan | Tamil | |
| 2016 | Irudhi Suttru | Tamil | |
| 2016 | Guru | Telugu | |
| 2017 | Vikram Vedha | Tamil | |
| 2017 | Shubh Mangal Saavdhan | Hindi | |
| 2018 | Tamizh Padam 2 | Tamil | |
| 2019 | Game Over | Tamil; Telugu | |
| 2021 | Aelay | Tamil | |
| 2021 | Mandela | Tamil | |
| 2021 | Jagame Thandhiram | Tamil | |
| 2021 | Kadaseela Biriyani | Tamil | |
| 2022 | Vikram Vedha | Hindi | co-produced with Bhushan Kumar, Krishan Kumar, Chakravarthy Ramachandra, Vivek B. Agrawal, Neeraj Pandey |
| 2023 | Thalaikoothal | Tamil | |
| 2023 | Martin Luther King | Telugu | |
| 2024 | Bramayugam | Malayalam | |
| 2025 | Test | Tamil | |
| 2025 | Diés Iraé | Malayalam | |
