= Va (film) =

- Theatrical release poster
- Directed by: Pushkar–Gayatri
- Written by: Pushkar–Gayatri
- Produced by: S. Sashikanth
- Starring: Shiva; Lekha Washington; S. P. B. Charan
- Cinematography: Nirav Shah
- Edited by: Anthony
- Music by: G. V. Prakash Kumar
- Production company: YNOT Studios
- Distributed by: Cloud Nine Movies
- Release date: 5 November 2010
- Country: India
- Language: Tamil
- Budget: ₹4.5 crore

Va (Tamil: வ; Tamil numeral for 1/4; working title: Va Quarter Cutting) is a 2010 Indian Tamil-language black comedy film written and directed by Pushkar–Gayatri. It stars Shiva, SPB Charan and Lekha Washington, with Kalyan, John Vijay and Abhinayashree playing supporting roles. The film's story takes place in one night, in which a man, with the help of his would-be brother-in-law, hunts for a last liquor before leaving to Saudi Arabia.

The film, produced by S. Sashikanth's YNOT Studios and distributed by Dayanidhi Azhagiri's Cloud Nine Movies, features music composed by G. V. Prakash Kumar, editing by Anthony and cinematography by Nirav Shah. It was released on 5 November 2010, during Diwali.

== Plot ==
Sunderrajan aka Sura comes to Chennai from Coimbatore on his way to Saudi Arabia. He is received by Marthandam, a veterinary doctor who is going to get his sister married soon. After the travel agent informs Sura that he cannot taste liquor or women in Saudi, he and Marthandam go to a wine shop to have the last gulp. It is a dry day thanks to elections. Sura is determined to taste the 'quarter' and starts his journey to various places in Chennai where he is told that liquor would be available. He goes to a politico who supplies wine for votes, a star hotel, an Anglo-Indian group of youngsters, a fish market, a gambling den, a kulfi shop, and a brothel house, among other places, all in search of 'quarter'. During his trip, he meets Saraswathi aka Saro, who attempts suicide after her parents scold her, and King-Prince, a father-son duo who run a gambling centre. How Sura, in the company of Marthandam and Saro, succeeds in his mission and leaves for Saudi forms the remaining story.

== Cast ==
- Shiva as Sunderrajan (Sura)
- S. P. B. Charan as Marthandan, Sura's brother-in-law
- Lekha Washington as Saraswathi (Saro)
- John Vijay as Pichai (Prince) and King
- Kalyan as Sokkathangam
- Abhinayashree as Singari Sundaram
- Kaali Venkat as Mano
- R. Amarendran as Gnani
- Sai Dheena as Vettu
- Manikka Vinayagam
- Krishnamoorthy
- Craig Gallyot as Babyface
- Arya as Chandru (guest appearance)

== Production ==
The film was publicised under the title Va: Quarter Cutting, but due to the use of English words, it did not meet the requirements for the then Government of Tamil Nadu's Entertainment Tax Exemption Act, which demands titles of creative works to be in Tamil only. Thus, the film's title was shortened to Va, meaning one-fourths, while Quarter Cutting was made the tagline. Because the story takes place mainly in one night, the film was shot mainly between 6:00pm and 6:00am everyday.

== Soundtrack ==
Soundtrack scored by G. V. Prakash Kumar. The track "Unnai Kan Thedudhe" samples the song of the same name composed from Kanavane Kankanda Deivam (1955). "Thediyae" is based on "The Show" by Australian singer Lenka. The audio launch was held in early September 2010.

Track listing
No.	Title	Lyrics	Singer(s)	Length
1.	"Dialogue 1"		Shiva, S. P. B. Charan	0:25
2.	"Unnai Kan Thedudhe"	Kumararaja	G. V. Prakash Kumar, Gana Ulaganathan	3:39
3.	"Dialogue 2"			0:15
4.	"Thediyae Thediyae"	Kumararaja	Andrea Jeremiah	5:30
5.	"Dialogue 3"	Snehan	Shiva	0:17
6.	"Saudi Basha"	Shiva, R. Amarendran	G. V. Prakash Kumar, Bhargavi	3:10
7.	"Dialogue 4"		Shiva, S. P. B. Charan	0:06
8.	"Saarpu Saarpu Ji"	Kumararaja	G. V. Prakash Kumar, Lakshmikanth	3:38
9.	"The Quarter Song"	Kumararaja	G. V. Prakash Kumar, Gana Ulaganathan, Remix: DJ Vijay Chawla	3:38
Total length:				19:20

== Critical reception ==
A critic from The Times of India rated the film 2 1/2 out of 5 stars and wrote that "The cocktail in the screenplay of "Va" doesn’t quite jel and leaves you dissatisfied as the kick is not quite up to the mark. It only leaves you wanting for one more drink". Pavithra Srinivasan from Rediff.com gave the film the same rating and wrote that "Va Quarter Cutting certainly has its moments of brilliance (due to Shiva's own performance). But there are also moments when it becomes mundane, irritating and loses pace. And it's these moments that prevent it from being a completely enjoyable experience". Malathi Rangarajan from The Hindu wrote that "The helming team of Pushkar and Gayatri comes a cropper in this comedy attempt, which lacks cohesion. Incidentally, why does the promo (!) call Va a ‘mokkai padam' (boring film)? Confession?" A critic from Sify wrote that "On the whole, Va Quarter Cutting is a big letdown, despite having some of the best comic actors, from the current crop".
