= Rangoon (soundtrack) =

Soundtrack album by Vishal Bhardwaj
- Released: 18 January 2017
- Recorded: 2016–2017
- Studio: Studio Satya, Mumbai; The Pierce Room, London; Abbey Road Studios, London; Angel Recording Studios, London
- Genre: Feature film soundtrack
- Length: 48:06
- Language: Hindi
- Label: T-Series
- Producer: Ketan Sodha; Clinton Cerejo; Hitesh Sonik; Dipanjan Guha

Vishal Bhardwaj chronology
Motu Patlu: King of Kings (2017)	Rangoon (2017)	Carbon (2018)

Rangoon is the soundtrack album to the 2017 Hindi-language film of the same name directed, co-produced and composed by Vishal Bhardwaj, starring Saif Ali Khan, Shahid Kapoor and Kangana Ranaut in the lead roles. The album featured 12 tracks composed by Bhardwaj with lyrics written by his recurrent songwriter Gulzar and Lekha Washington, who also contributed two tracks. The album was released on 18 January 2017 through the T-Series label.

== Background ==
Vishal Bhardwaj composed the film soundtrack and score, with lyrics written by his norm lyricist Gulzar. To make the film realistic, Bhardwaj used a live orchestra in recording the songs instead of using junior artists playing musicians. The film score was recorded at the Abbey Road Studios in London performed by the London Symphony Orchestra. Actress Lekha Washington had written lyrics for two English songs, "Be Still" and "Shimmy Shake", in her maiden songwriting stint.

== Release ==
The album was preceded by the song "Bloody Hell", which was released in a music video format on 11 January 2017. The soundtrack was released through T-Series on 18 January.

== Reception ==
Vipin Nair of The Hindu noted that Bhardwaj and Gulzar's collaboration had "always reserved its best for [the latter] own movies" and felt Rangoon to be "another such work of brilliance". Manish Gaekwad of Scroll.in noted that the soundtrack "bear[s] Bhardwaj's indelible stamp" with him experimenting with several musical styles and genres as well as Gulzar aiding him through the lyrics which are "equally dazzling and overwhelming at times". He concluded that the album "requires repeat listening to catch up with the composer-lyricist duo who stridently march to their own beats."

Karthik Srinivasan of Milliblog reviewed, "Vishal at his usual, unorthodox best in Rangoon." Ashwin Vinayan of Deccan Chronicle wrote "Vishal has reiterated once again, why he's amongst the best musicians the industry has hosted" calling the album "worth savouring". Joginder Tuteja of Bollywood Hungama noted that though it takes time to get used to the period-era soundscape, it becomes immersive when listened on loop further adding that "this one is set to find greater appreciation after it has been seen and heard in the film."

Swetha Ramakrishnan of Firstpost added that the soundtrack "has something for every kind of listener" and would work for avid listeners of Bhardwaj's music. However, Suanshu Khurana of The Indian Express felt that the music "lack[ed] the gloriousness the past records by this lyricist-composer duo has had" which led to the album being "acceptable, just not edgy enough". Uday Bhatia of Mint wrote "The music, by Bhardwaj, with lyrics by Gulzar, has old-timey touches but makes no real effort to sound as if it's from that era".

== Track listing ==
No.	Title	Lyrics	Singer(s)	Length
1.	"Bloody Hell"	Gulzar	Sunidhi Chauhan	4:12
2.	"Yeh Ishq Hai"	Gulzar	Arijit Singh	4:40
3.	"Mere Miyan Gaye England"	Gulzar	Rekha Bhardwaj	3:47
4.	"Tippa"	Gulzar	Sukhwinder Singh, Rekha Bhardwaj, Sunidhi Chauhan	5:44
5.	"Ek Dooni Do"	Gulzar	Rekha Bhardwaj	3:57
6.	"Alvida"	Gulzar	Arijit Singh	5:03
7.	"Julia"	Gulzar	Sukhwinder Singh, K.K, Kunal Ganjawala	5:52
8.	"Chori Chori"	Gulzar	Rekha Bhardwaj	2:53
9.	"Yeh Ishq Hai (Female Version)"	Gulzar	Rekha Bhardwaj	4:44
10.	"Rangoon Theme"		Instrumental	1:31
11.	"Be Still"	Lekha Washington	Dominique Cerejo	3:08
12.	"Shimmy Shake"	Lekha Washington	Vivienne Pocha	2:26
Total length:				48:06

== Accolades ==
Award	Date of ceremony	Category	Recipient	Awards	Ref.
Mirchi Music Awards	28 January 2018	Best Song Producer (Programming & Arranging)	Clinton Cerejo and Hitesh Sonik — "Hawayein"	Won	
Mirchi Music Awards	28 January 2018	Best Background Score	Vishal Bhardwaj	Won	

== Personnel ==
Credits adapted from T-Series:

- Music: Vishal Bhardwaj
- Music producer: Ketan Sodha, Clinton Cerejo, Hitesh Sonik, Dipanjan Guha
- Music assistant: Mayukh Sarkar
- Recording: Salman Khan Afridi (Studio Satya, Mumbai); Chris Parker (Angel Recording Studios, London)
- Mixing: Salman Khan Afridi (Studio Satya, Mumbai); Steve Fiztmaurice (The Pierce Room, London)
- Mixing assistance: Charles Wong
- Mastering: Christian Wright (Abbey Road Studios, Mumbai)

Musicians

- Choir: Neisha Mascarenhas, Marianne D'cruz Aiman, Shazneen Arethna, Rishikesh Kamerkar, Suhas Sawant, Vikas Joshi, Rajiv Sundaresan, Deepti Rege, Mayuri Patwardhan, Archana Gore, Pragati Joshi, Aditi Prabhudesai, Aparna Ullal, Arun Ingle, R. N. Iyer, Mandar Apte, Nitin Karandikar, Vivienne Pocha, Neuman Pinto, Bianca Pinto, Crystal Sequeira, Thomson Andrews, François Casstellino, Asif Ali Baig, Mahesh Kumar Rao, Nazim Khan, Subhan Sultani, Sonu Khan
- Choir arrangements: Rajiv Sundaresan, Neuman Pinto
- Guitars: Ankur Mukherjee
- Acoustic guitar: Mayukh Sarkar
- Flute: Ashwin Srinivasan
- Viola, violin: Suresh Lalwani
- Strokes: Tapas Roy
- Saxophone: I. D. Rao
- Harmonium: Firoz Shah
- Shehnai: Sanjeev Shankar
- Dholak: Mohd. Yusuf, Hafeez Khan Sharafat Khan, Raju Sardar, Navin Sharma
- Tabla: Musharraf Khan, Sanjiv Sen, Navin Sharma
- Rhythm arrangements: Sanjiv Sen

Orchestra

- Orchestra: London Symphony Orchestra
- Orchestra conductor: Simon Hale
- Orchestra leader: Perry Montague-Mason
- Orchestra contractor: Isobel Griffiths
- Assistant orchestra contractor: Lucy Whalley
- Violins: Natalia Bonner, Emil Chakalov, Frances Dewar, Alison Dods, Jonathan Evans-Jones, Lousia Fuller, Richard George, Ian Humphries, Patrick Kieman, Boguslaw Kosteeki, Jenny Lewisohn, Perry Montague-Mason, Steve Morris, Tom Pigott-Smith, Warren Zielinski
- Violas: Max Baillie, Nick Barr, Bruce White
- Cellos: Ian Burdge, Nick Cooper, Martin Loveday, Chirs Worsey
- Double bass: Richard Pryee, Chris Laurence
- Trumpets: John Barclav, Tom Rees-Roberts
- French Horns: Richard Bissill, Philip Eastop, Martin Owen, Laurence Davies
- Tuba: Owen Slade
- Tenor trombones: Richard Edwards, Ed Tarrant
- Bass trombone: Roger Argente
