= Test (2025 film) =

Indian film by S. Sashikanth

- Official release poster
- Directed by: S. Sashikanth
- Written by: S. Sashikanth; Suman Kumar
- Produced by: Chakravarthy Ramachandra; S. Sashikanth
- Starring: R. Madhavan; Nayanthara; Siddharth; Meera Jasmine
- Cinematography: Viraj Singh Gohil
- Edited by: T. S. Suresh
- Music by: Shakthisree Gopalan
- Production company: YNOT Studios
- Distributed by: Netflix
- Release date: 4 April 2025
- Running time: 146 minutes
- Country: India
- Language: Tamil

Test is a 2025 Indian Tamil-language sports psychological thriller film directed by S. Sashikanth, who co-wrote the script with Suman Kumar and produced with Chakravarthy Ramachandra under YNOT Studios. The film stars R. Madhavan, Nayanthara, Siddharth and Meera Jasmine in lead roles, with Kaali Venkat, Nassar and Vinay Varma in supporting roles. A hyperlink film, it follows three parallel storylines: a scientist's struggles to save his hydro-fuel project, his wife's maternal aspirations, and a faded cricketer seeking to retire on a high note.

The film marks Sashikanth's directorial debut and was announced in April 2023. Principal photography commenced the same month and continued till January 2024, taking place predominantly in Chennai and Bengaluru. The film features music composed by Shakthisree Gopalan, cinematography handled by Viraj Singh Gohil and editing by T. S. Suresh.

Test had a direct-to-streaming release via Netflix on 4 April 2025. The film received mixed reviews from critics, who praised the performances of the lead cast but criticised the screenplay, pacing, and predictability. Despite this, it became one of the most streamed Indian films in 13 countries in its opening week.

== Plot ==
Arjun Venkataraman, an ageing cricketer, is struggling with poor form and faces the risk of being dropped from the Indian team. Determined to retire on a high note, he sees the upcoming test match as his last chance to prove himself.

Kumudha, a school teacher, is desperate to have a child and plans to undergo IVF treatment. However, her dreams are complicated by financial challenges and her husband's priorities.

Saravanan "Sara" is Kumudha's husband. An MIT-educated scientist, he is secretly working on a hydro-fuel project while pretending to run a canteen. He is under immense pressure due to mounting debts and needs ₹50 lakh (equivalent to ₹52 lakh or US$55,000 in 2026) to save his project.

As the film progresses, the lives of these three characters intersect during the test match. Arjun battles his inner demons on the cricket field, Kumudha struggles with her maternal aspirations, and Sara faces ethical and financial dilemmas related to his project. Meanwhile, a subplot involving match fixing adds further tension.

== Cast ==
- R. Madhavan as Saravanan "Sara"
- Nayanthara as Kumudha Saravanan
- Siddharth as Arjun Venkataraman
- Meera Jasmine as Padma "Paddu" Arjun
- Lirish Rahav as Aditya "Adi" Arjun
- Kaali Venkat as Bharani
- Aadukalam Murugadoss as Kutty
- Nassar as ICF Member Ramasamy
- Mohan Raman as Venkataraman
- Vinay Varma as Dharmesh Agarwal
- Meera Krishnan as Principal R. Meera Duraiswamy
- Deepa Shankar as Karpagam
- Shyam Kumar as Isaac Aghilan IPS
- Vivek R Venkatram as Inspector Shakthivel
- Ajit Koshy as Javed
- Dr. Ashwin Vijay as A. Magizhendi
- M. J. Shriram as Meiyappan
- Denver Antony Nicholas as Dimello
- Dr. Vidhya Borgia as Dr. Vidya Shankar

== Production ==
=== Development ===
Test marked the directorial debut of producer S. Sashikanth. Ever since his transition from an architect to film production with Sashikanth establishing the YNOT Studios banner, he wrote the first draft in late-2012 but the script was put on hold due to his production commitments. In a January 2015 interview with Sudhish Kamath, Sashikanth confirmed that he had plans of making the film. During the COVID-19 lockdown in India, he decided to revisit the script after harbouring his ambitions of becoming a filmmaker. The original script was considered a plot-driven film with the basic idea revolving around a cricketer; however, he decided to get into the psychological study of the characters, inspired from David Fincher's films.

The genesis of the film came from an interview given by Virat Kohli, who stated that his father died when he was 18-years old, yet Kohli still played in the Ranji Trophy match for Delhi. Sashikanth recalled that the interview opened his perspective of what happens when a cricketer enters into the arena, adding "it's something like a superhero story arc that he's willing to sacrifice all those personal bits for something much higher. Those decisions make you the hero or the villain." Exploring narcissistic behaviour as a positive trait, the idea provided him an insight of how sportsperson would think and look at life and looked on how narcissism existed in common people as well. He then wrote the story on how narcissism drives a cricketer and a common man, which was the beginning of character development. Describing the title, Sashikanth said, "Test cricket is not just cricket. It is a test of life and even temperament. The story too happens over five days of a test match".

The film was officially announced on 12 April 2023. Sashikanth co-wrote the story with Suman Kumar, known for writing The Family Man. Shortly after the announcement, Sashikanth revealed the preliminary crew members: cinematographer Viraj Singh Gohil, editor T. S. Suresh, production designers Madhusudan N. and Shweta Sabu Cyril, sports director Dhruv Panjani, action choreographer Dinesh Subbarayan, stylists Poornima Ramaswamy and Anu Vardhan, casting director Sharanya Subramaniam and publicity designer Gopi Prasannaa. Muthuramalingam was appointed as the executive producer of the film by the production house.

=== Casting ===
R. Madhavan and Siddharth were cast in the lead roles, having previously worked with Sashikanth on his productions; the film would also mark the actors reuniting after Aayutha Ezhuthu (2004) and Rang De Basanti (2006). Initially, Madhavan rejected the script as he felt the role would not suit him and suggested other actors instead; he felt Sashikanth, who never worked as an assistant director before, was taking a risk with the film due to its large budget, but eventually accepted the offer after perceiving Sashikanth's vision.

Siddharth underwent a nine-month training in cricket to prepare for his role. His character was inspired by several real cricketers, but he dedicated the role specifically to Rahul Dravid. Nayanthara, who plays Madhavan's pair, accepted the role instantly after a phone call with Sashikanth. He wanted the actress to own her role, and she was able to connect with the role of a woman longing for a child, being a mother herself. Meera Jasmine was paired opposite Siddharth, making a return to Tamil cinema after a 10-year hiatus.

Kaali Venkat was cast in an important role after being present in the first schedule of filming. Subsequently, Nassar, Vinay Varma, Aadukalam Murugadoss, M. J. Shriram and Ajit Koshy appeared in supporting roles; their involvement was confirmed only after their appearances in promotional material. Sashikanth cast 22 cricketers, who played the Ranji Trophy matches, to create authenticity.

=== Filming ===
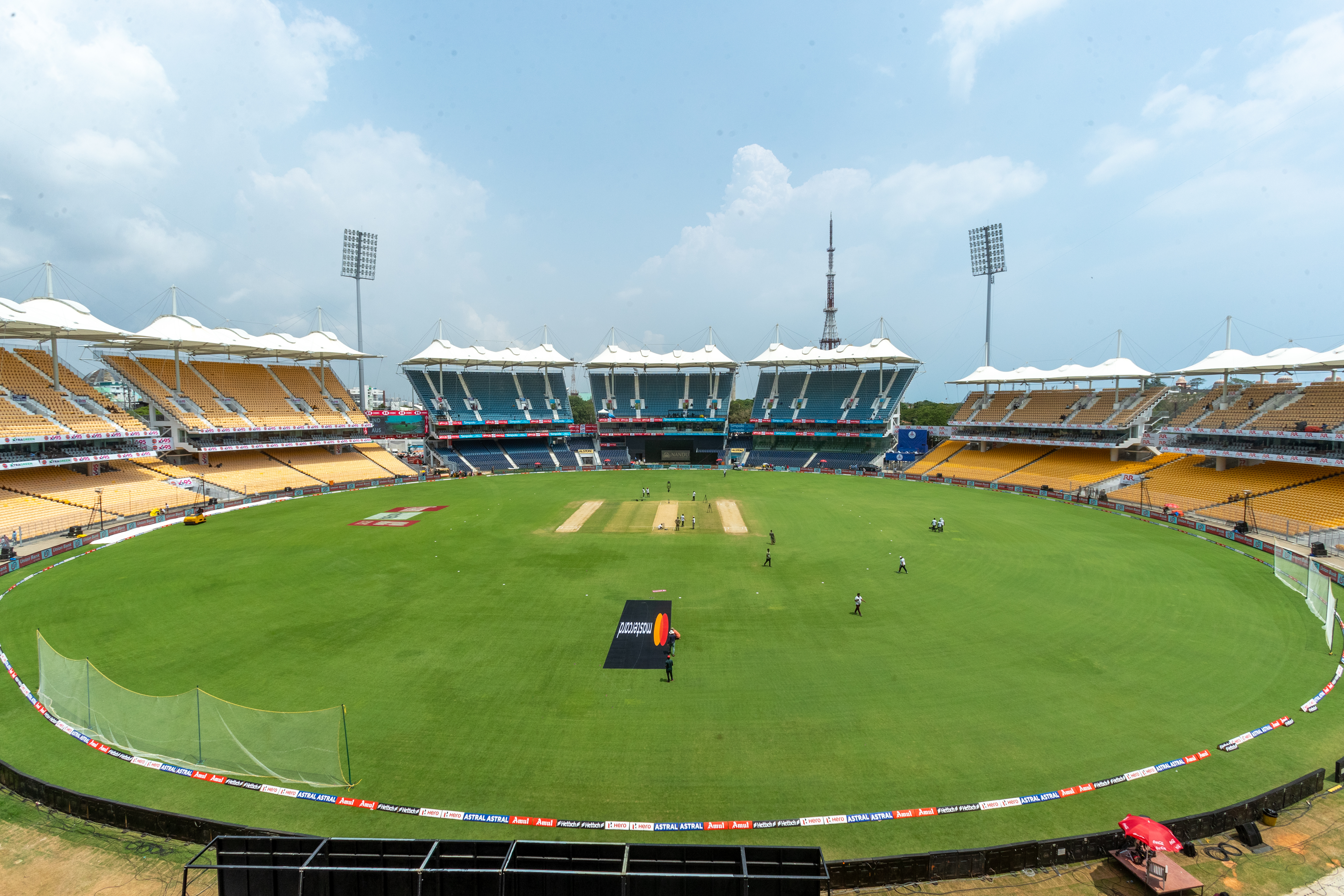
The cricket sequences were shot at the M. A. Chidambaram Stadium in Chennai.

Principal photography commenced on 12 April 2023, the same day as the film's announcement. The film was shot in two phases, taking place in both Chennai and Bengaluru. The locations were chosen in the pre-production phase and had further marked the positions of the camera using the StudioBinder software and also choreographed the movements of the actors.

Since the film's story takes place in the test match, Sashikanth had planned to shoot the cricket sequences at the M. A. Chidambaram Stadium in Chennai, where the team had to wait nine months for approval from the Tamil Nadu Cricket Association. The team received approval to shoot those sequences ten days before the Indian Premier League owing to pitch changes. Since Sashikanth wanted the match to look authentic, he and Viraj Singh Gohil researched on what worked and what did not in cricket-based films and spoke with cameramen on how real cricket matches were shot. Gohil used broadcast cameras for filming those matches and learnt about specific camera positions on how cricket matches are being filmed. Sashikanth used live sounds for the portions that were not shot in the ground.

By 17 June, Madhavan had completed filming his portions. By early January 2024, Nayanthara had completed filming her portions, and Jasmine did so later that month. Principal photography wrapped on 31 January.

=== Post-production ===
The post-production process began in early February, shortly after filming wrapped. OK Vijay serves as the visual effects supervisor, and sound design was handled by Kunal Rajan and M. R. Rajakrishnan whereas Siddharth Sadashiv served as the sync sound recordist.

== Music ==
The film's music is composed by playback singer Shakthisree Gopalan in her debut as music composer. The first single "Arena" was released on 10 March 2025. The second single titled "Hope" was released on 20 March. The album featuring six songs was released under the YNOT Music label on 25 March.

== Marketing ==
The film's teaser trailer was launched on 3 February 2025. On 13 March 2025, cricketer Ravichandran Ashwin released the teaser of Siddharth's character via his social media platforms. Nayanthara and Madhavan's character teasers were released the following days. As a part of promotions, a lenticular billboard that featured two posters were installed at the Marina Beach road in Chennai. The film's trailer was launched on 25 March 2025.

== Release ==
In October 2024, it was reported that the film would have a direct-to-streaming release via Netflix, bypassing theatrical release. This was confirmed in early-February, after Netflix announced their slate of original programming and films for the year, with Test being one of them. The film premiered on 4 April 2025, with dubbed versions in Hindi, Kannada, Malayalam and Telugu.

While speaking on the direct-to-streaming release, Sashikanth said that a film should find its audience at several means, adding that he had no negative connotations with this move. Sashikanth initially planned for a theatrical release, but when he had an opportunity to send the first cut to Netflix, the streaming service's content team saw its viability of being a global product and reaching a wider audience. Seeing this as a "no-brainer", Sashikanth accepted the decision to release it on a streaming service. Monika Shergill, vice-president of content, Netflix India, stated that she felt amazed to see a film that explored characters and their values and ethics over plot.

== Critical reception ==
On the review aggregator website Rotten Tomatoes, 18% of 11 critics' reviews are positive, with an average rating of 3.8/10.

Sonal Pandya of Times Now gave 3.5/5 stars and wrote "Test is a lengthy but intriguing thriller focused on a couple backed into the tightest corner [...] What the film needed more of, especially in the second half, was the tension of the walls closing in on these individuals. At certain portions, it feels as if they existed in their own bubbles while things descended into chaos outside. Test doesn't utilise the sports background effectively." Janani K of India Today gave 2/5 stars and praised the lead cast performances, music, cinematography and editing, saying the film "aims to bring forth the changing stances of a human being during a crisis. While the idea sounds interesting, it hardly translates to the big screen". Latha Srinivasan of Hindustan Times also praised these aspects and the premise, but said the "story, sadly, doesn't do justice to them". Vishal Menon of The Hollywood Reporter India said the film "gives us a set of fascinating characters, but deserved better writing".

Hardika Gupta of the NDTV gave 2/5 stars and wrote "Test ultimately reflects its titular sporting format – lengthy, occasionally rewarding, but lacking the consistent dynamism needed to sustain interest across its duration. Sashikanth's direction shows promise in individual moments, particularly in his approach to scene transitions and visual storytelling, but the overall execution falls short of the ambition evident in the premise." Bhuvanesh Chandar of The Hindu wrote "Sashikanth's directorial debut is a competent showcase of his abilities as a director. At a time when films largely rely on curveballs and subversions to keep the audiences gripped, Test refuses to become a T20 and prioritises character over plot." Nandini Ramnath of Scroll.in wrote, "Test takes its title very seriously. S Sashikanth's Tamil film, co-written with Suman Kumar, piles on the woes for its lead characters and everyone else who has the misfortune of being associated with them". Sudhir Srinivasan of Cinema Express rated the film 2.5/5 stars and wrote, "Test explores ambition, obsession, and morality—but in its struggle to create emotional intimacy, it leaves us at a distance. This is a film rich in ideas, but curiously hollow in feeling".

Writing for Common Sense Media, Jose Solís criticised the film's length and clashing of genres, saying, "The sober character study is encumbered by the forced thriller elements, and scenes of great emotional drama are intercut with moments that feel almost comedic when contrasted". Ankit Ojha of The National called Test a "perfectly functional film with a narrative that could have benefited from a slower, more calculated approach, rather than trying to juggle multiple themes throughout". Lachmi Deb Roy of Firstpost wrote, "I won’t say that the film is flawless or a masterpiece [...] but with it's [sic] appealing cast, it truly deserves every bit of your time".
