= Huduga Hudugi =

Huduga Hudigi
- Poster
- Directed by: Indrajit Lankesh
- Produced by: Sandesh Nagaraj
- Starring: Dhyan; Lekha Washington
- Cinematography: Gundlupet Suresh
- Edited by: K. M. Prakash
- Music by: Dharma Vish
- Production company: Sri Sandesh Combines
- Release date: 12 November 2010
- Country: India
- Language: Kannada

Huduga Hudugi is a 2010 Kannada-language comedy film written and directed by Indrajit Lankesh. The film features Dhyan and Lekha Washington in the lead roles, whilst other noted actresses play roles in the film. The film was launched in 2008 as Thunta Thunti with Ganesh and Praneetha in the lead roles and then a second launch was conducted in March 2010 with Ganesh and Ishita Sharma but the pair later opted out of the project.

== Plot ==
Sachin, a popular TV anchor co-hosts a hugely popular show with Sonia. Both of them carry their own emotional baggage. While Sachin has had a stint with heartbreak, Sonia's disappointment stems from being refused by a rich guy to marry her. Sachin tries to bring some happiness into her life and in the process they get closer. Sonia comes to terms with the fact that Sachin is the best guy for her. But will she be able to get Sachin?

== Cast ==
- Dhyan as Sachin
- Lekha Washington as Sonia
- Sadha as Maya
- Sanjjana as Sachin's friend
- Anita Hassanandani
- Jadi Akash
- Pramod Hegde as Raj Deshpande
- Rangayana Raghu
- Sharan
- Suchendra Prasad as a television anchor
- Ileana D'Cruz in an item number "Ileana"
- Bianca Desai in an item number "Sathiya"
- Indrajit Lankesh in an item number "Huduga Hudugi"

== Soundtrack ==
The music was composed by Joshua Sridhar and released by Anand Audio Video.

Huduga Hudugi

Soundtrack album by Joshua Sridhar
- Released: Oct 12, 2010
- Recorded: 2010
- Genre: Soundtrack
- Length: 29:29
- Label: Anand Audio Video
- Producer: Joshua Sridhar

Joshua Sridhar chronology
Gaana Bajaana (2010)	Huduga Hudugi (2010)	Devadas (2010)

Track list
No.	Title	Lyrics	Singer(s)	Length
1.	"Ileana"	Kaviraj	Benny Dayal, Krissy, Rita	4:30
2.	"Danthada Bombena"	Kaviraj	Karthik	4:33
3.	"Huduga Hudugi"	Kaviraj	Karthik, SuVi	3:49
4.	"Usire Ninna"	K. Kalyan	Kunal Ganjawala	3:38
5.	"Sathiya"	K. Kalyan	Sunidhi Chauhan	4:30
6.	"Tunta Tunti"	K. Kalyan	Karthik	3:51
7.	"Usire Ninna (Remix)"	K. Kalyan	Kunal Ganjawala	4:38
Total length:				29:29

== Reception ==
=== Critical response ===
A critic from The Times of India scored the film at 4 out of 5 and wrote "Dhyan does a commendable job as a TV anchor, and Lekha Washington has matched up to his performance. Joshwa Sridhar's foot-tapping music is sure to attract youngistan. Dialogues by B A Madhu are clever". Shruti Indira Lakshminarayana of Rediff.com scored the film at 1.5 out of 5 stars and says "The film takes a dig at several popular tv programmes and hosts, but at the same time leaves enough scope for the media to pick out its flaws. The 'ugly truth' about Huduga Hudugi is that it is a collage of several mushy movies. There is nothing new even for the die-hard romantics". A critic from The New Indian Express wrote "Sharan’s comedy is not up to the mark. It is not clear what made the director select Rangaayana Raghu to imitate late Shankar Nag. The director has not even spared journalists and TV channels including the CEO of a particular channel. Perhaps, his intention was to make the audience giggle. The USP of this film is glamorous heroines and eyepleasing cinematography. Finally, Indrajit has proved that he too can act in films by shaking his leg along with lanky Russian beauties".
