= Dileepan =

Indian actor

- Born: Dileepan; 12 October 1979 (age 47); Madras, Tamil Nadu, India
- Occupation: Actor
- Years active: 2013-present
- Relatives: A. R. Murugadoss (brother)

Dileepan is an Indian actor, working in the Tamil film industry. He made his film debut with the 2013 film, Vathikuchi.

== Life ==
Dileepan is the younger brother of film director A. R. Murugadoss.

== Career ==
Dileepan made his debut as the protagonist in his cousin's production film, Vathikuchi (2013), opposite Anjali. Dileepan achieved success with a supporting role in Kaala (2018), directed by Pa. Ranjith.

== Filmography ==
- All films are in Tamil, unless otherwise noted.

Year	Title	Role	Notes
2013	Vathikuchi	Sakthi	Nominated–SIIMA Award for Best Male Debutant
2017	Nenjil Thunivirundhal	Durai Pandi's assistant	
2017	C/o Surya	Sambasivudu's assistant	Telugu film
2018	Kaala	Selvam	
2019	Kuthoosi	Vel	
2020	Lock Up	New Inspector	Cameo appearance
2021	Writer	Arivazhagan	
2022	Aadhaar		
2022	Repeat Shoe	Dileepan	
2023	Maaveeran	Selvam	
2023	800	Manohar	
2024	Election		
2024	Raayan	Guru	
2024	The Greatest of All Time	Dhilip	
2025	Ten Hours	Meiyappan	
2025	Eleven	Manohar	Simultaneously shot in Telugu
2025	Phoenix		
2025	Coolie	Saravanan	
2025	Dawood		
2025	Indian Penal Law		
2026	Granny	Sub-Inspector V. Prathaban	
2026	Blast	K. Arunagiri	

=== Television ===
Year	Title	Role	Platform	Notes
2024	Snakes and Ladders		Amazon Prime Video	
