= Kuthoosi =

2019 Indian film by Siva Sakthi

- Film poster
- Directed by: Siva Sakthi
- Written by: Siva Sakthi
- Starring: Dileepan; Amala Rose Kurian
- Music by: N. Kannan
- Production company: Sri Lakshmi Studios
- Release date: 25 January 2019
- Running time: 135 minutes
- Country: India
- Language: Tamil

Kuthoosi (transl. Needle) is a 2019 Indian Tamil-language action drama film written and directed by Siva Sakthi. The film stars Dileepan and Amala Rose Kurian in the lead roles while Yogi Babu and Siva play supportive roles in the film. The film was released on 25 January 2019 clashing with Charlie Chaplin 2 and Simba on the same date and opened to mostly average reviews from the critics.

== Plot ==
The film revolves around the hardships faced by farmers who struggle to make an impact in their lives and to make ends meet. Vel (Dileepan), who hails from Kallakurichi, is not interested in his father's occupation of farming and plans to settle in the US. He borrows money from his girlfriend (Amala Rose Kurian) and goes to Chennai in search for a job. After obtaining a job in a US-based company in Chennai, he comes back to the village and tell his parents about his plans of taking them along with him. However, his father's sudden demise spoils all of his plans, and later, he was compelled and pressured by his mother and girlfriend to take up farming and fulfill his father's dream of turning their land into a fertile one. In this pursuit, he is forced to lock horns with a landlord in his village who has been forcefully asking farmers to surrender their lands to him.

== Cast ==
- Dileepan as Velu
- Amala Rose Kurian as Velu's girlfriend
- V. I. S. Jayapalan
- Yogi Babu as Velu's friend
- Mippu
- Siva

== Production ==
The film began its shoot in January 2014 and was predominantly completed in the following months. Financial problems meant that the film had a delayed release.

== Soundtrack ==
Kuthoosi (Original Motion Picture Soundtrack)

Soundtrack album by N. Kannan
- Released: 13 June 2018
- Recorded: 2018
- Genre: Soundtrack
- Producer: N. Kannan

N. Kannan chronology
Tamizh Padam 2 (2018)	Kuthoosi (Original Motion Picture Soundtrack) (2018)	Thalaikoothal (2023)

All songs are composed by N. Kannan.

Track list
No.	Title	Singer(s)	Length
1.	"Kalvarayan"	Hari Hara Sudhan	4:48
2.	"Vaanam"	Swetha Mohan, Anand Aravindakshan	4:06
3.	"Chikku Chikku"	Ramya Nambeesan	3:59
4.	"Ulagame"	Srinivas	4:11
5.	"Inga Thottil"	Jeni	2:46
