= Kannan (composer) =

Indian film music composer

N.Kannan
- Years active: 2005- present

Kannan is an Indian film music composer who worked in the Tamil film industry. He debuted in 2010 with Tamizh Padam.

== Career ==
Kannan studied at Music College before beginning his career as a guitarist in 1988. Over the course of a decade, he composed jingles for about 600 commercials through the agency of C. S. Amudhan. The same agency provided the opportunity for Kannan to compose music for his film score debut Tamizh Padam (2010). Kannan revealed that even though the film was a spoof, he "wasn't specifically asked to spoof other songs." The soundtrack received positive reviews from critics who called it an "amusingly memorable debut for Kannan." The songs "Pacha Manja" and "O Maha Zeeya" were well received. Kannan has received more recognition for his contributions to this film than to previous films which went largely unnoticed.

== Filmography ==
Year	Film	Notes
2010	Tamizh Padam	
2011	Chaplin Saamandhi	
2012	Mayanginen Thayanginen	
2012	Mai	
2012	Yaarukku Theriyum	Also dialogue writer; Tamil film, Simultaneously shot in Kannada as Challenge and in Malayalam as 120 Minutes
2013	Azhagan Azhagi	
2013	Rendavathu Padam	Soundtrack released; film unreleased
2013	Karuppampatti	
2014	Pongadi Neengalum Unga Kadhalum	
2014	Kalkandu	
2015	Pongi Ezhu Manohara	
2015	Thilagar	
2018	Tamizh Padam 2	
2019	Kuthoosi	
2023	Thalaikoothal	
2023	Raththam	
2024	Anjaamai	Composed one song "Kadavula Naanum"
