= ITFA Best Movie Award =

The ITFA Best Movie Award is given as part of the International Tamil Film Awards for Tamil (Kollywood) films.

== Winners ==
Following is a list of the award winners and the films for which they won.

Year	Movie	Producer
2011	Mankatha	Dhayanidhi Alagiri
2008	Abhiyum Naanum	Prakash Raj
2007		
2006		
2005		
2004		
2003	Kannathil Muthamittal	Mani Ratnam

== See also ==
- Tamil cinema
- Cinema of India
