= Tamizh Padam 2 =

2018 film directed by C. S. Amudhan

- Theatrical release poster
- Directed by: C. S. Amudhan
- Written by: K. Chandru
- Story by: C. S. Amudhan
- Produced by: S. Sashikanth; Chakravarthy Ramachandra
- Starring: Shiva; Iswarya Menon; Sathish; Disha Pandey
- Cinematography: Gopi Amarnath
- Edited by: T. S. Suresh
- Music by: N.Kannan
- Production company: YNOT Studios
- Distributed by: Trident Arts
- Release date: 13 July 2018
- Running time: 145 minutes
- Country: India
- Language: Tamil

Tamizh Padam 2: Police Athiyayam (transl. Tamil Film 2: Police Chapter), or simply Tamizh Padam 2, is a 2018 Indian Tamil-language parody film written and directed by C. S. Amudhan and produced by S. Sashikanth and Ramachandra of YNOT Studios. A sequel to the successful Tamizh Padam (2010), the film stars Shiva, Iswarya Menon, Sathish, and Disha Pandey. The music was composed by Kannan with cinematography by Gopi Amarnath and editing by T. S. Suresh. The film released on 13 July 2018.

== Plot ==
Shiva, the universal cop, has left the police department and has returned to his hometown of Cinemapatti. He is brought back in to resolve a crisis. Once the situation is resolved, Police Commissioner Yezhusaamy asks him to join the department, but he refuses and walks away. P, a dreaded don who poses a threat to society, kills Shiva's wife Priya by using a cell phone bomb. Shiva is forced to rejoin the police department. Meanwhile, Shiva is looking for a girl to marry upon his grandmother's request. His conditions for a girl are that he wants a loosu ponnu (a bubbly but crazy girl). He sees Ramya and assumes that she is crazy since she went into a mental hospital van. With the help of his friends, he proposes to her.

Shiva learns that P has fixed a bomb somewhere from clues given by P's henchman Wasim Khan. Shiva realizes that P has fixed a bomb on a bus. He discovers that P has fixed the bomb, so if the bus is driven less than or more than five kilometers per hour, it will explode. However, Shiva saves the people inside the bus. Rithika, P's henchwoman, kills Wasim. Shiva then discovers that someone in the department informed P about their ideas. He discovers and kills Inbashekhar, the mole, and is seemingly suspended.

Shiva realizes that Ramya is not a patient in the hospital but rather a psychiatrist, and breaks up with her. His friends advise him to reunite with her. He decides to, but Ramya has left for America. Shiva also goes there to find her, and they reunite in Central Park. Then, it is revealed that Shiva went on a mission to America to catch P, and that he was not suspended. When the mission is in progress, Ramya is kidnapped and killed by P. Back in Chennai, Shiva is very sad about Ramya's death. His grandmother asks him to take her to the cemetery. She took some promises which were to kill P, marry a girl more beautiful than Ramya (the girl he loved and who died), and to give her a great-grandchild.

Shiva sketches a plan to catch P by demonetising 500 and 1000 rupee notes with the help of the government. He goes to a temple to attend his friend Bharath's marriage. There, he meets Gayathri, a lookalike of Ramya, and gets shocked. He proposes to her in the next two minutes when he sees her. The demonetisation forces P to stand in an ATM queue because he had a lakh crores of 1000 rupee notes. Shiva executes his plan perfectly, but P escapes. Shiva catches him at his Kovalam beach resort. He kills him, but P comes alive and becomes the CM-elect of Tamil Nadu.

Bodhi, a saint, calls Shiva and says that P is immortal. The enmity between P and Shiva is for 76 generations. In 300 BC, King Adhiyamaan was ruling Kovai. He appointed Piyaar as the kingdom's dance teacher, but his dance was demonic. Bharathamuni, another dancer whose dance was divine, wanted to do a dance-off with Piyaar. Adhiyamaan also said that the winner will get a jackfruit, which will bestow immortality upon whoever eats it, and his daughter Khaleesi will also marry him. However, Piyaar's henchmen kill Bharathamuni and his grandmother. As a result, Piyaar gets the jackfruit and becomes immortal.

Now, Shiva needs to go to 300 BC to win the dance-off with Piyaar. He gets a time travel watch from a watch mechanic. He goes back to 300 BC and wins the dance-off, Khaleesi, and the jackfruit. He then returns to 2018 and meets P, who kidnapped Gayathri. He reveals that he ate the jackfruit, and P is no longer immortal. He fights with his henchmen while Gayathri sings. Irritated by her singing, P kills her. Shiva also kills P and is arrested.

During the credits, Shiva is released from prison after 25 years. Worried that his romantic relationships with other women would result in their eventual deaths, his grandmother kills him.

== Cast ==
- Shiva in a dual role as:
  - M. Shiva
  - Barathamuni
- Iswarya Menon in a triple role as:
  - Ramya
  - Gayathri
  - Khaleesi
- Disha Pandey as Priya (Cameo appearance)
- Sathish in a dual role as:
  - P (Pandiya)
  - Piyaar
- Kalairani (replacing Paravai Muniyamma from the first film) in a dual role as:
  - Shiva's grandmother (D)
  - Barathamuni's grandmother
- Santhana Bharathi (replacing M. S. Bhaskar from the first film) as Nakul
- Manobala as Siddharth
- R. Sundarrajan (replacing Vennira Aadai Moorthy from the first film) as Bharath
- Nizhalgal Ravi as Inbasekhar
- Chetan as Police Commissioner B. Yezhusaamy
- Ajay Rathnam as King Adhiyamaan
- Gerard Pio as Bodhi (voice given by C. S. Amudhan)
- O. A. K. Sundar as Wasim Khan
- George Vijay Nelson as Paramu
- Jiiva in a special appearance
- Venkat Prabhu in a special appearance
- Premgi in a special appearance
- Kasthuri as in a special appearance as an item dancer
- Navya Suji as Boxer Rithika
- S. Sashikanth in a special appearance in the song "Naan Yaarumilla"
- Soundariya Nanjundan as P's PA/Hacker (uncredited)

== Production ==
Director C. S. Amudhan confirmed that pre-production work was underway for a sequel to Tamizh Padam (2010) during July 2017. The film would feature Shiva reprising the lead role, while S. Sashikanth of YNOT Studios would be the main producer. After initially attempting to recruit Oviya to the cast, the makers chose to retain Disha Pandey from the first film, while actress Iswarya Menon was added to the cast. Sathish, who portrayed a minor role in the first film, was signed to play a larger role in the sequel. Kannan and T. S. Suresh who were part of first film was retained as composer and editor respectively, while Nirav Shah's commitments to Shankar's science-fiction film 2.0 (2018) meant that cinematography duties were assigned to Gopi Amarnath. Gerard Pio, the assistant director of the film, also starred in the film in a supporting role.

The film began with a launch event on 8 December 2017 held in Chennai, with the shoot beginning thereafter. Two promotional posters for the film were released soon after the start of production, parodying the torrent site Tamil Rockers and former Tamil Nadu Chief Minister O. Panneerselvam's dramatic late-night meditation session at Marina Beach following his resignation.

On June 21, 2018, the director announced title change from the originally announced title Tamizh Padam 2.0 to Tamizh Padam 2.

== Soundtrack ==
Tamizh Padam 2

Soundtrack album by N. Kannan
- Released: 30 June 2018
- Recorded: 2018
- Genre: Soundtrack
- Length: 27:39
- Label: Think Music
- Producer: N. Kannan

N. Kannan chronology
Thilagar (2015)	Tamizh Padam 2 (2018)	Kuthoosi (2019)

All songs were composed by N. Kannan, who earlier composed for the director's previous ventures. The soundtrack was released by Think Music.

Track list
No.	Title	Lyrics	Singer(s)	Length
1.	"Naan Yaarumilla"	C. S. Amudhan, Chandru	Mark, Kumaresan	4:12
2.	"Phoenix Paravai"	Chandru	Srinisha Jayaseelan	1:31
3.	"Kalavarame"	Madhan Karky	Pradeep Kumar, Chinmayi Sripaada	3:40
4.	"Evada Unna Petha"	C.S.Amudhan, Chandru	Ranina Reddy	4:12
5.	"Vaa Vaa Kaama"	Thiyaru	Ujjayinee Roy	4:12
6.	"Chella Penne"	C.S. Amudhan, Chandru	Jithin, Sowmya	2:04
7.	"Aatharamaanai"	Thiyaru	K Thilaka	2:09
8.	"En Nadanam"	Thiyaru	Sharreth, Vijay Prakash	4:45
9.	"Ulagam Athira Vaada"	Thiyaru	M. M. Manasi	0:54
Total length:				27:39

== Release and reception ==
Tamil Nadu theatrical rights of the film were sold for ₹3.5 crore.

On the review aggregator website Rotten Tomatoes, 88% of 8 critics' reviews are positive, with an average rating of 5.8/10.

Sify wrote "On the whole, Tamizh Padam 2 is fun unlimited. [..] Sometimes, a good laugh is all you need to make your day." Cinema Express wrote "While the film's willingness to let nobody off the hook is truly refreshing, the comedy doesn't work nearly as often as it should". Times of India wrote "First things first — Tamizh Padam 2 offers what's expected from it. With a slew of spoof scenes taking potshots at umpteen number of Tamil movies, the unique attempt works this time, too." Hindustan Times wrote "While the film is a laugh riot, it lacks the freshness Tamizh Padam had. It works as a sequel because the films and themes they have picked are relatable. However, lack of freshness can reduce this franchise to a formula too."

== Box office ==
The film collected ₹4.2 crore (US$450,000) in first day, ₹2.8 crore (US$300,000) in second day and ₹10 crore (US$1.1 million) in third day bringing the weekend total to ₹17 crore (US$1.8 million). The film collected ₹1.51 crore (US$160,000) in Chennai in three days.

== Sequel ==
Tamizh Padam 3 began filming on 5 November 2026.
