= Adra Machan Visilu =

2016 Indian film by Thiraivannan

- Directed by: Thiraivannan
- Written by: Thiraivannan
- Produced by: B. Gopi
- Starring: Shiva; Naina Sarwar; Srinivasan
- Cinematography: A. Kasi Vishwa
- Edited by: Sujith Sahadev
- Music by: N. R. Raghunanthan
- Production company: Arasu Films
- Release date: 7 July 2016
- Country: India
- Language: Tamil

Adra Machan Visilu (transl. Dude, blow the whistle) is a 2016 Indian Tamil-language comedy film directed by Thiraivannan, starring Shiva, Srinivasan and Naina Sarwar. The music was composed by N. R. Raghunanthan.

== Cast ==
- Shiva as Simmakkal Sekhar
- Naina Sarwar as Dhevi
- Powerstar Srinivasan as Powerstar Muniyaandi
- Arun Balaji as Goripalayam Rahmath
- Sentrayan as Palanganatham Babu
- Singamuthu as Dhuraisingam
- Mansoor Ali Khan as Doctor
- Raj Kapoor
- K. Selva Bharathy
- T. P. Gajendran
- K. P. Jagan as Jagan
- Velmurugan
- Jangiri Madhumitha as Hema
- Sujatha Sivakumar as Simmakkal Sekhar's mother
- Daniel Annie Pope as Hema's lover
- Sumathi G. as hospital lady
- Ambani Shankar
- Shanthi Arvind as beach dancer

== Production ==
The project was first reported in the media during June 2015, with reports stating that Powerstar Srinivasan would feature in a film titled Naanum Herodhaan which would tell the story of an actor forced to repay his fans for their losses during the film distribution process. The concept was considered to be a satire on the issue faced by Rajinikanth following the failure of Lingaa (2014) at the box office. The film began production during the final quarter of 2015 and the shoot progressed at the AVM Studios later under the tentative title of Simmakkal Sekhar.

== Release ==
The film opened in July 2016 to negative reviews. The critic from The Hindu stated "the filmmaking is shocking" and concluded that the film was "excruciating", while The New Indian Express stated "crude and loud with the message on your face, the film is clearly meant for the lowest denominator in the audience".

== Soundtrack ==
Adra Machan Visilu

Soundtrack album by N. R. Raghunanthan
- Released: 14 April 2016
- Recorded: 2016
- Genre: Feature film soundtrack
- Language: Tamil
- Labels: Muzik 247; Eros International
- Producer: N. R. Raghunanthan

N. R. Raghunanthan chronology
| Mapla Singam (2016) | Adra Machan Visilu (2016) | Pichuva Kaththi (2017) |

N. R. Raghunanthan composed the songs and background music for the film.

Track listing
| No. | Title | Lyrics | Singer(s) | Length |
|---|---|---|---|---|
| 1. | "Thalaivan Purantha Naalu" | Thiraivannan | Diwakar, Anitha Karthikeyan | 4:02 |
| 2. | "Yaaru Iva" | Thiraivannan | G. V. Prakash Kumar, Namitha Babu | 5:15 |
| 3. | "Devathai Devathai" | Thiraivannan | D. Sathyaprakash | 4:03 |
| 4. | "Nenjil Yaaradhu" | Na. Muthukumar | Naresh Iyer, Chinmayi | 5:09 |
| 5. | "Kannamoochi" | Viveka | Anthony Daasan, Thanjai Selvi | 4:13 |
| Total length: | | | | 22:42 |
