= Peter Gaya Kaam Se =

- Poster
- Directed by: John Owen
- Written by: Zuhaebb & John Owen
- Produced by: Ronnie Screwvala
- Starring: Rajeev Khandelwal; Lekha Washington
- Cinematography: Alphonse Roy
- Edited by: Aarti Bajaj
- Music by: Sajid–Wajid
- Release date: 27 September 2014 (London)
- Country: India
- Language: Hindi

Peter Gaya Kaam Se is a 2014 Hindi action adventure film directed by John Owen. The film has only been screened once under the title, The Goa Run, at the Raindance Film Festival in London in September 2014.

== Plot ==
Peter, an avid football fan and motorcycle taxi driver, resolves to leave Goa and resign from his job. However, his unscrupulous loan shark boss, Bosco, convinces him to undertake one final assignment, a task that will irrevocably alter his life.

== Cast ==
- Rajeev Khandelwal as Peter
- Lekha Washington as Mira
- Isha Talwar
- Prashant Narayanan as Carlos
- Raj Singh Arora
- Rachit Trehan as KJ
- Rajesh Tailang

== Production ==
Following the success of his first film Aamir, UTV Motion Pictures re-signed Rajeev Khandelwal in June 2008 to be a part of their next film to be directed by British film maker John Owen. Shooting of the film, described as an action adventure, began on location in Goa India in August 2008. Alphonse Roy was signed on as cinematographer to shoot the film in 35mm. Actress Lekha Washington was added to the cast to make her first Hindi film appearance, after successfully coming through auditions.

The film was subsequently completed with the actors finishing their scenes and dubbing duties, before the production house suffered financial problems and release plans were stalled.
