= Colors Super Kids =

Indian children's reality television show

- Genre: Kinds; Reality
- Presented by: Shiva, Mirchi Vijay
- Country of origin: India
- Original language: Tamil
- No. of episodes: 26

Production
- Producer: C.Sudhakar
- Camera setup: Multi-camera
- Running time: 40–45 minutes

Original release
- Network: Colors Tamil
- Release: 24 February – 20 May 2018

Colors Super Kids is a 2018 Tamil-language children's reality television show airing on Colors Tamil from 24 February 2018 and 20 May 2018 on Saturdays and Sundays at 20:00 (IST) and every Monday to Friday at 21:30 (IST). The show presented children's exceptional abilities in areas beyond traditional academic achievement. The first 10 episodes were hosted by Shiva and the remaining 16 episodes were hosted by Mirchi Vijay.
