= Kadaseela Biriyani =

- Theatrical release poster
- Directed by: Nishanth Kalidindi
- Screenplay by: Nishanth Kalidindi; Vivekanand Kalaivanan
- Story by: Nishanth Kalidindi
- Produced by: S. Sashikanth; Chakravarthy Ramachandra; Nishanth Kalidindi
- Starring: Vasanth Selvam; Dinesh Mani; Vijay Ram; Hakim Shahjahan
- Narrated by: Vijay Sethupathi
- Cinematography: Azeem Mohammad; Hestin Jose Joseph
- Edited by: Ignatious Aswin
- Music by: Vinoth Thanigasalam; Neil Sebastian; Judah Paul
- Production company: YNOT Studios
- Distributed by: YNOTX
- Release date: 19 November 2021
- Running time: 113 minutes
- Country: India
- Language: Tamil

Kadaseela Biriyani (transl. Biryani in the end) is a 2021 Indian Tamil-language black comedy film directed and co-written by Nishanth Kalidindi. The directorial debut of Nishanth Kalidindi, it was shot in 2016 and completed in 2018, but was released theatrically over three years later on 19 November 2021. The film stars Vasanth Selvam, Dinesh Mani and Vijay Ram and met with positive reviews. Set in Kottayam, Kerala, the film also contains Malayalam dialogues. Three brothers break into the rubber estate to avenge their father's death, but fate has cruel plans as they are welcomed by the landlord's psychopath son.

== Plot ==
The narrator, Vijay Sethupathi, recounts the tale of Chikku Pandi (Vijay Ram), who as a young child is removed from the rest of his family by his father, who wishes to protect him from their violent criminal ways and instead raise him to lead a simple peaceful life. Chikku concentrates on his studies, hoping to meet his father's ambition of becoming a doctor. However when Chikku turns 16, his father is murdered by the owner of a large rubber plantation, Sathyan (Vishaal Ram). Chikku reunites with his older brothers Periya Pandi (Vasanth Selvam) and Ila Pandi (Dinesh Mani), who pressure him into a plan to avenge their father's death by killing Sathyan. The three brothers travel to Sathyan's rubber plantation in Kanjirappally, Kerala. Expecting to have to kill several of Sathyan's workers to gain access, they instead find the plantation deserted. At Sathyan's house they see that Sathyan's son Johan Kariya (Hakkim Shah), a notorious psychopath, has unexpectedly returned home, causing the plantation workers to flee in fear. The brothers overhear an argument between Johan and his father, during which Johan taunts his father by revealing that he had killed his father's mistress and burnt their son alive. Johan mocks his father's grief.

Ila Pandi wants to abort the mission but Periya Pandi insists they proceed with the plan to avenge their father's death. They sneak into the house, tie up Sathyan and move him into the nearby forest. Ila Pandi, who is acting as lookout, is discovered by Johan who questions him. Periya Pandi comes to his aid, claiming to Johan that they had stumbled upon the house while looking for their brother. Johan is sceptical, but Chikku distracts him by smashing a picture in the house, allowing all three brothers to flee into the forest. After killing Sathyan, they hitch a ride from a passing lorry driven by a fellow Tamilian, Gabriel, who is transporting coffins. On the back of the lorry, the three brothers toast their success, with Chikku planning to buy a biryani to celebrate. One of the coffins opens, and Gabriel's son Andrew, who had been sleeping in it, sits up. In shock, Ila and Periya fall off the lorry to their eventual deaths.

When the police reach the scene they take Gabriel, Andrew and Chikku into custody. Rather than taking them to the police station, the police (who are both on the payroll of and terrified of Johan), head toward's Johan's house, Johan having discovered his father's body. Gabriel, Andrew and Chikku flee into the dense forest, which is too impenetrable for the police to find them. What follows is a cat and mouse game as the police, together with Johan and his henchmen, surround the forest to prevent their escape. Johan, who wants to burn down the forest to smoke them out, expresses frustration that Chikku is too much of a weakling to provide a satisfactorily challenging prey.

Andrew seemingly manages to escape the forest, but is soon caught and returned to Johan, who burns him alive while forcing Gabriel, who had come to give himself up, to watch. Chikku, cowering in fear, is taunted by Johan who shouts into the forest that there is no escape. Realising he has no option but to fight back, Chikku leaves the forest, managing to kill two of Johan's henchmen before confronting Johan himself. Seemingly pleased with Chikku's new-found courage, Johan laughs and offers to tell him a joke. Before he can do so he is run over and killed by a lorry (driven by Vijay Sethupathi in a cameo appearance). The driver briefly laments that this is the 36th time he has hit someone, before shrugging it off and offering Chikku a lift. The film ends with Chikku in Pondicherry, ordering a biriyani in a local restaurant, as the narrator hopes that he will be able to return to living a simple life.

== Cast ==
- Vasanth Selvam as Periya Pandi
- Dinesh Mani as Ila Pandi
- Vijay Ram as Chikku Pandi
- Vishaal Ram as Sathyan
- Hakim Shahjahan as Johan Kariya aka Panni Kusu Roast
- Sabha Srinivaasan as Gabriel
- Augustine R Kevin as Andrew
- Vijay Sethupathi as a lorry driver (cameo)

== Soundtrack ==
The original background score of the film was composed by Vinoth Thanigasalam and the songs are composed by Neil Sebastian and Judah Paul. The songs album featured seven tracks with lyrics written by Umadevi, Suhail Koya, Tenzin Rangdol, Payal John and Solar Sai.

Track listing
| No. | Title | Lyrics | Music | Singer(s) | Length |
|---|---|---|---|---|---|
| 1. | "Aarariro" | Umadevi | Judah Paul | Suraj Jagan | 5:07 |
| 2. | "Aarariro" (Acoustic) | Umadevi | Judah Paul | Alphons Joseph | 4:04 |
| 3. | "Lovely" (Malayalam) | Suhail Koya | Neil Sebastian, Immanuel Roberts | Jassie Gift | 3:04 |
| 4. | "Manjaadi" (Malayalam) | Suhail Koya | Neil Sebastian | Arun Ghosh | 3:31 |
| 5. | "Baby" (English) | Tenzin Randol | Neil Sebastian, Immanuel Roberts | Tenzin Randol | 3:00 |
| 6. | "Giorno Di Pioggia" | Payal John | Neil Sebastian | Payal John | 2:38 |
| 7. | "Kadavuley" | Uma Devi, Solar Sai | Neil Sebastian | Solar Sai | 3:39 |
| 8. | "Kadaseela Biriyani Theme" | | Judah Paul | | 1:35 |
| 9. | "The Plan" | | Vinoth Thanigasalam | | 2:51 |
| 10. | "The Pandis" | | Vinoth Thanigasalam | | 2:39 |
| 11. | "The Chase" | | Vinoth Thanigasalam | | 2:26 |
| 12. | "Saithan's God" | | Vinoth Thanigasalam | | 2:54 |
| 13. | "The Sac goes away" | | Vinoth Thanigasalam | | 3:34 |
| 14. | "The Animal and the wall" | | Vinoth Thanigasalam, Neil Sebastian | | 4:27 |

== Reception ==
Srivatsan S. of The Hindu stated that, "even though the film won't give you a wholesome feeling, the commitment from a debutant filmmaker is visible and I’m willing to give all my money". Haricharan Pudipeddi of Hindustan Times wrote that "the film is one of the most bizarre films to come out of Tamil cinema in recent years, unabashedly raw indie film and is largely brilliant and naive in parts". He also added that, the film manages to stay largely engaging and is worth being called one of the best films of the year.

Navein Darshan of The New Indian Express praised the director, saying that "the film is dark, yet hilarious, despite being filled with newcomers, but pleasantly surprises by delivering a finished product, signaling the arrival of a daring filmmaker". Sify called the film an amusing thriller as it deserves a watch for its unique presentation, style, and original plot. Dinamalar rated the film with 2.5/5 stars, stating that, even though the film tests their patience in the first half, it turns into an engrossing product in the second half with several scenes deserving applause. M Suganth of The Times of India rated the film with 3.5/5 stating that, "the thriller film is full of cinematic vigour and keeps us hooked from start to finish and unfolds like a dark comic experience, filled with colourful characters". He concluded that "the filmmaker announces his arrival loud and clear and we can't wait to see where he goes from here".
