= Tamizh Padam =

2010 film by C. S. Amudhan

- Theatrical release poster
- Directed by: C. S. Amudhan
- Written by: K.Chandru (dialogue)
- Screenplay by: C. S. Amudhan
- Produced by: Dayanidhi Azhagiri; S. Sashikanth
- Starring: Shiva; Disha Pandey; Paravai Muniyamma
- Cinematography: Nirav Shah
- Edited by: T. S. Suresh
- Music by: Kannan
- Production companies: Cloud Nine Movies; YNOT Studios
- Release date: 29 January 2010
- Running time: 120 minutes
- Country: India
- Language: Tamil
- Budget: ₹1.8 crore

Tamizh Padam (transl. Tamil Film) is a 2010 Indian Tamil-language parody film written and directed by C. S. Amudhan in his directorial debut. The film stars Shiva and Disha Pandey. It is the first full-length spoof in Tamil cinema. It parodies contemporary commercial films and actors in Tamil cinema, mocking the stereotypical scenes.

The film was distributed by Dhayanidhi Alagiri under the banner Cloud Nine Movies. The music was composed by Kannan with cinematography by Nirav Shah and editing by T. S. Suresh. The film was released on 29 January 2010 to critical acclaim and became a commercial success. The film was later remade in Telugu as Sudigadu. A sequel called Tamizh Padam 2 was released in 2018.

== Plot ==
In the Indian village of Cinemapatti, male infanticide is predominant, and all male babies are required to be killed immediately after birth. One such baby is headed for such a fate, until he "speaks" to his caretaker-grandmother (Paravai Muniyamma) and asks to be sent to Chennai on a goods train, where he plans to grow into a hero. The old woman complies, and takes the baby, named Shiva, to Chennai and raises him herself, living in the city's poorer section.

On growing into manhood, Shiva (Shiva) gains a reputation by giving a massive entry by beating up extortionists by throwing them in the air and saving a rape victim; soon he is glorified as a "mass hero". (Note: In Tamil cinema, the term "mass hero" is a colloquialism referring to an immensely popular actor who can romance, sing, dance, amuse, and defeat several goons in a fight.) He manages to defeat gangster Devaraj with a clever exchange of puns and a costumed associate. He spends his time hanging out, drinking, and playing carrom with his gang of friends, composed of Nakul (M. S. Bhaskar), Bharath (Vennira Aadai Moorthy) and Siddharth (Manobala).

Shiva runs into a headstrong girl named Priya (Disha Pandey), whom he falls in love with. After learning of her hatred for men, he realizes that she has dedicated her life to classical dance, so he learns Bharatanatyam over the course of a night and performs an exaggerated dance sequence for her. She reciprocates his feelings, and the two start a relationship. Shiva is then challenged by Priya's rich and powerful father Kodeeswaran, who refuses to give his daughter to a poor man. Shiva swears to become a billionaire, and promptly does so, during the course of a song.

Kodeeswaran accepts Shiva as a suitor and fixes his engagement to Priya. During the ceremony, Shiva hears a passing comment that he does not know his own father. Offended, he travels to Cinemapatti, accompanied by Bharath, to learn his roots. After encountering a host of Tamil-cinema stereotypes of several decades ago, he succeeds in uniting with his family when a woman (revealed to be Shiva's father's concubine) leads him to his father, mother and sister. He finds them when they sing their "family song" (the Michael Learns to Rock number "Someday").

However, unknown to anyone, Shiva has been targeting and killing several criminals in secret: he kills female gangster Swarna by making her slip over a banana peel; makes another big-time crook laugh to death; tortures a drug dealer to commit suicide by continuous failed attempts on his life; and kills his final victim with the odor of his sock. The police discover that he is the killer, and it is revealed that Shiva is actually an undercover officer and was killing the criminals under direct orders from not only the Commissioner, but also from the President of the United States.

The ganglord who commandeered the slain criminals, a mysterious person simply called "D", organises the kidnapping of Priya by telling Pandian (Sathish) and his henchmen to kidnap her and has Shiva beaten up. Shiva recovers, saves Priya by fighting off thugs using exaggerated stunts, and comes face to face with "D", revealed to be his grandmother. She explains that she did this to increase the fame of her grandson, and a heartbroken Shiva is forced to arrest her.

At the trial, Shiva accidentally kills an assassin who targets his grandmother and is put on trial himself. He is saved, however, when a man who helped him in Cinemapatti earlier testifies that Shiva was a victim of circumstance. Both Shiva and "D" are pardoned, and Shiva who has been promoted to DGP, unites happily with Priya, his family and friends.

== Cast ==
- Shiva as Shiva
  - Sree Ram as young Shiva
- Disha Pandey as Priya
- M. S. Bhaskar as Nakul
- Manobala as Siddharth
- Vennira Aadai Moorthy as Bharath
- V. S. Raghavan as Judge
- Delhi Ganesh as "Heroin" Kumar
- Periyar Dasan as Mokkai (Shiva's father)
- Shanmugasundaram as CBI officer Shanmugasundaram
- Paravai Muniyamma as Grandmother (D)
- Azhagu as Kodeeswaran (Priya's father)
- Ponnambalam as Nattamai
- Mahanadi Shankar as 'Paan Parag' Ravi
- Sathish as Pandiya
- Halwa Vasu as Kodeeswaran's assistant
- Seenu as Devaraj
- Meesai Rajendran as DGP Sundaram
- Ammu Ramachandran as Sheela
- Kovai Senthil as Kanakku (Nattamai's assistant)
- Nellai Siva as Minister
- Benjamin as Railway Guard
- Boys Rajan as Commissioner Natrajan
- Ayyappan as Rape Victim
- Rekha Suresh
- Periya Karuppu Thevar
- Thideer Kannaiah
- Theni Kunjarammal
- Kasthuri in an item number

== Production ==
S. Sashikanth, who was looking for scripts for his debut production for his production banner YNOT Studios got in touch with C. S. Amudhan, who was willing to make his directorial debut, submitted three pitches in different genres for his consideration, out of which Sashikanth chosen the script of spoofs and went ahead with it.

== Soundtrack ==
Tamizh Padam

Soundtrack album by Kannan
- Released: 1 January 2010
- Genre: Feature film soundtrack
- Label: Junglee Music
- Producer: Kannan

Kannan chronology
Tamizh Padam (2010)	Mayanginen Thayanginen (2012)

The soundtrack was composed by debutant Kannan. The song "O Maha Zeeya" consists entirely of gibberish words derived from earlier Tamil film songs.

Track listing
No.	Title	Lyrics	Singer(s)	Length
1.	"Kuthu Vilakku"	Thiyagu	Ujjayinee Roy
2.	"O Maha Zeeya"	C. S. Amudhan	Hariharan, Swetha Mohan
3.	"Oru Sooravali"	K. Chandru	Shankar Mahadevan
4.	"Pacha Manja"	K. Chandru	Mukesh Mohamed, Chorus
5.	"Theme Music"

== Release ==
In order to receive the film a wide release, Sashikanth opted to sell the film to Dayanidhi Alagiri who distributed and released the film under his company Cloud Nine Movies.

=== Reception ===
Upon release, the film received critical acclaim for its humour en route to becoming one of the box office successes of the year in Tamil Nadu. Rediff.com called the film a "must watch", while Sify.com labelled the film as a "rollicking comedy" and gave particular praise for Shiva's performance and the director's script and dialogues.

However The Times of India rated it 2.5/5, commenting, "It's a brilliant idea, to make a mocumentary of Tamil cinema, and the very concept raises your expectations" and concluded, "Having dared to test the waters, the director seems to have stepped back in apprehension."

== Legacy ==
Tamizh Padam was the first full-length parody film of Tamil cinema. In hindsight, it has been considered a forerunner of a 2010s "new wave" of more experimental, outsider-created films, such as Aaranya Kaandam, Pizza and Jigarthanda. These films deviated from the traditional narratives of commercial Tamil cinema by exploring absurdist and experimental concepts, with more realistic stories and neo-noir influences.

== Bibliography ==
- Nakassis, Constantine V. (December 2022). "Chapter Three: The Politics of Parody". Onscreen/offscreen. Studies in the anthropology of language, sign, and social life. University of Toronto Press. pp. 113–145. ISBN 978-1-4875-4179-8.
