= C. S. Amudhan =

Indian film director, screenwriter and lyricist

- Born: Sebastian Amudhan; 19 July 1977 (age 49); Madras (now Chennai), Tamil Nadu, India
- Occupations: Film director, Screenwriter, Lyricist
- Years active: 2001–present
- Spouse: Ahalya
- Relatives: Dindigul I. Leoni (father-in-law)

C. S. Amudhan (born 19 July 1977) is a film director, screenwriter and lyricist from the Tamil film industry in India.

== Career ==
Amudhan made his cinematic debut as a lyricist with Minnale (2001), where he wrote the song "Maddy Maddy". He made his directorial debut with Tamizh Padam, the first full-length spoof film on Tamil cinema, with Shiva playing the lead role. The film, distributed by Dayanidhi Azhagiri's Cloud Nine Movies, released on 29 January 2010 and won critical acclaim and commercial success at the box office, earning cult status. In late 2010, he began work on a film titled Nakka Mukka starring Vijay Antony in the lead role describing that it would be another film in a "new genre", however the film failed to progress. Furthermore, in October 2011, it was rumoured that Amudhan was working on a film titled Thalavali which would feature lookalikes of leading actors Vijay and Ajith Kumar in the lead roles; the director later denied the claims.

He later announced that his second film would be Rendavathu Padam, another full-length comic entertainer, featuring Vimal, Remya Nambeesan, Aravind Akash and Richard in the lead roles, however despite completing production in 2014 it remains unreleased. The sequel Tamizh Padam 2 got released in 2018.

== Personal life ==
His wife is Ahalya, daughter of pattimanram anchor and orator Dindigul I. Leoni.

== Filmography ==
=== As director ===
Year	Film	Notes
2010	Tamizh Padam	
2018	Tamizh Padam 2	
2023	Raththam	

=== As lyricist ===
Year	Film	Song	Composer
2001	Minnale	"Maddy Maddy"	Harris Jayaraj
2010	Tamizh Padam	"Oh Mahazeeya"	Kannan
2014	Anegan	"YOLO (You Only Live Once)"	Harris Jayaraj
2018	Tamizh Padam 2	"Evada Unna Petha", "Naan Yaarumilla", "Chella Penney"	Kannan

=== As dubbing artist ===
Year	Film	Character	Notes
2018	Tamizh Padam 2	Bodhidharman	
