= Vikram Vedha (2022 film) =

2022 Indian film by Pushkar–Gayatri

- Theatrical release poster
- Directed by: Pushkar–Gayatri
- Written by: Pushkar–Gayatri
- Dialogues by: Manoj Muntashir; B. A. Fida
- Based on: Vikram Vedha by Pushkar–Gayatri
- Produced by: Bhushan Kumar; Krishan Kumar; S. Sashikanth; Neeraj Pandey
- Starring: Saif Ali Khan; Hrithik Roshan; Radhika Apte; Rohit Saraf; Yogita Bihani; Satyadeep Mishra; Sharib Hashmi
- Cinematography: P. S. Vinod
- Edited by: Richard Kevin A.
- Music by: Songs: Sam C. S.; Vishal–Shekhar; Score: Sam C. S.
- Production companies: T-Series; Reliance Entertainment; Jio Studios; YNOT Studios
- Distributed by: PVR Inox Pictures; Pen Studios; Home Screen Entertainment
- Release date: 30 September 2022
- Running time: 160 minutes
- Country: India
- Language: Hindi
- Budget: est. ₹100 crore
- Box office: est. ₹135.03 crore

Vikram Vedha is a 2022 Indian Hindi-language neo-noir action thriller film co-written and directed by Pushkar–Gayatri. A remake of their 2017 Tamil film of the same name, it is inspired by the Indian folktale Vetala Panchavimshati and stars Saif Ali Khan and Hrithik Roshan in the titular roles. Radhika Apte, Rohit Saraf, Yogita Bihani, Satyadeep Mishra, and Sharib Hashmi appear in supporting roles. In the film, a police officer sets out to track down and kill a gangster. After voluntarily surrendering himself, the gangster tells the police officer three stories which change his perceptions of good and evil.

Production began in October 2021 and concluded in June 2022, taking place in Abu Dhabi and Lucknow. The film's soundtrack was composed by Sam C. S. and Vishal–Shekhar, the former who scored music for the original Tamil film.

Vikram Vedha was theatrically released on 30 September 2022 and received positive reviews from critics with praise towards the direction, cinematography, screenplay, background score, and cast performances (particularly Khan and Roshan). The film underperformed at the box-office grossing ₹135 crore against its budget of ₹100 crore. At the 68th Filmfare Awards, it received eight nominations, including Best Actor (Roshan).

== Plot ==
Vikram, an honest police officer, leads a special task force formed to capture or kill the notorious gangster Vedha. During an encounter operation, Vikram's unit kills several criminals and falsely identifies one of the victims as an armed offender to avoid investigation. Soon afterward, Vedha unexpectedly walks into a police station and surrenders. While being interrogated, he offers to tell Vikram a series of stories from his past.

Thirteen years earlier in Kanpur, Vedha worked for crime lord Parshuram Pandey while caring for his younger brother Shatak, a mathematical prodigy, and their friend Chanda. Despite Vedha's attempts to keep them away from crime, a gangster named Babloo forces Shatak and Chanda to transport drugs. When they are caught by the police, Babloo punishes Shatak by burning his hand with a heated rod on orders from his superior. Vedha asks Vikram whether he should kill Babloo or the superior who gave the order; Vikram replies that the superior is the real culprit. After Vedha is released on bail by Vikram's wife Priya, Vikram realizes that the man his team killed in the earlier encounter was Shatak, identifiable by the burn mark.

Suspecting that Vedha may seek revenge, Vikram rushes to protect his colleague Abbas but finds him and Chanda dead in what is reported as a failed encounter. Determined to capture Vedha, Vikram tracks him down, but Vedha tells another story before escaping. In this account, Shatak, now grown up, manages Vedha's money through stock investments while in a relationship with Chanda. After Chanda briefly steals the money to start a new life but returns out of love for Shatak, Vedha's boss orders him to kill her. Vedha asks Vikram whether he should obey the order or protect Shatak and Chanda; Vikram advises him to support them.

As Vikram investigates further, he discovers links between Babloo and members of his own task force. Vedha later reveals that Abbas had secretly been working with Babloo in exchange for money to fund his son's medical treatment. Babloo had orchestrated a plan to lure Shatak and Chanda out of hiding so they could be killed and Vedha could be drawn out. Abbas eventually tried to save them, but corrupt officers in the unit killed both and staged the incident as an encounter.

Realizing that his entire team has been compromised, Vikram confronts them, and a gunfight breaks out. Vedha returns to help him, and together they defeat the corrupt officers, though Vikram kills the task force's commanding officer. In the aftermath, Vikram and Vedha face each other in a standoff, leaving Vikram to decide whether to arrest Vedha as a criminal or let him go for revealing the truth.

== Cast ==
- Saif Ali Khan as SSP Vikram
- Hrithik Roshan as Vedha Betal
- Radhika Apte as Advocate Priya, Vikram's wife
- Rohit Saraf as Shatak Betal, Vedha's brother
  - Ishan Tripathi as young Shatak
- Yogita Bihani as Chanda
  - Drashti Bhanushali as young Chanda
- Satyadeep Mishra as SSP Abbas Ali
- Sharib Hashmi as Babloo
- Sudhanva Deshpande as IG Surendhar
- Govind Pandey as Parashuram Pandey
- Manuj Sharma as Constable Dubey
- Bhupendra Negi as SI Giri
- Dev Chauhan as Inspector Prabhakar
- Kapil Kashyap as Head Constable Yashwant
- Vijay Sanap as SI Ranjan
- Saurabh Sharma as SI Ansari
- Rati Shankar Tripathi as Shiv Prasad
- Bhushan Vikas as Ravi
- Sahidur Rehman as Sanki
- Varun Pande as Munna
- Saksham Shukla as Kallu
- Vijay Srivastava as Gajju
- Amarjeet Singh as Muni
- Priya Shukla as Samira, Abbas' wife
- Samrat Yaduvanshi as Sohail Ali, Abbas' son
- Milind Joshi as Senior Lawyer Shukla
- Durgaprasad Mahapatra as MLA Mithilesh Tiwari
- Danish Akhtar Saifi as Daddan
- Chetan Kushawala as Dilip
- Navdeep Tomar as Anthony George
- Ankur Sharma as Martin George
- Anil Khopkar as Ramabhilak Pandey

== Production ==
=== Development ===
In March 2018, it was announced that Pushkar–Gayathri would direct a Hindi remake of their Tamil film Vikram Vedha (2017), to be produced by YNOT Studios. The project would be co-produced by Friday Filmworks, T-Series Films and Reliance Entertainment, with filmmaker Neeraj Pandey serving as a creative producer. Pushkar–Gayathri intended for the remake to maintain the "gritty" tone that the original film had. Although Pandey had initially avoided working on remakes due to his preference to write original material, he was interested in working on this project because of its parallels to Vikramaditya and Betal from the folktale collection Vetala Panchavimshati, which he felt was not yet done in Hindi cinema.

=== Casting ===
Shah Rukh Khan was approached for the film, but declined. In August 2019, it was confirmed that Saif Ali Khan and Aamir Khan would play the roles of Vikram and Vedha respectively. Saif differentiated Vikram from Sartaj Singh, another police officer he played in the streaming television series Sacred Games, stating Vikram is "much more dynamic, confident and strong" than Singh who was suicidal, and constantly picked on by others. Pushkar–Gayathri revealed that they were unable to have R. Madhavan reprise his role of Vikram from the original, due to his commitments to Rocketry: The Nambi Effect (2022).

After production delays due to the COVID-19 pandemic during which the writers also re-worked the script, Aamir left the project in December 2020 and was shortly thereafter replaced by Hrithik Roshan. This would mark the second time Saif and Roshan would share screen space after Na Tum Jaano Na Hum (2002). As Vedha is from Kanpur, Roshan decided to speak with an Awadhi accent. In July, Radhika Apte was cast as Vikram's lawyer wife and Rohit Saraf signed on to play Vedha's brother the following month. In November 2021, Sharib Hashmi was cast in a pivotal role. In March 2022, Yogita Bihani was chosen to play Chanda.

=== Filming ===
Principal photography was scheduled to commence in February 2021, when Aamir Khan was part of the cast. After Roshan replaced him, it was to have begun in June 2021, but ultimately began on 15 October that year with the first schedule taking place in Abu Dhabi. Before the schedule began, part of the sets originally built for Tiger Zinda Hai (2017) were reworked by Vikram Vedha's crew to resemble Lucknow and Kanpur. In response to reports that Roshan refused to shoot in Lucknow and asked the crew to create the Lucknow sets in Abu Dhabi, causing the budget to escalate, Reliance explained that UAE was "the only location providing the infrastructure for a bio-bubble that accommodated crew of such scale, also allowing building of sets in a studio during the preceding months of the shoot", and the film was shot there due to "health and protocol concerns". They added that their films' shooting locations and budgetary decisions are not controlled by actors. After the Abu Dhabi schedule concluded within 27 working days, the second schedule began in Lucknow in early December. Saif Ali Khan finished his portions of the schedule by the end of the month. Apte, whose schedule was only 10 days, finished filming most of her portions by 26 April 2022. Filming wrapped by 10 June 2022.

=== Post-production ===
The film began with animated sequences revolving around the king Vikramaditya and the demon Vetala. This sequence was directed by Isha Mangalmurti, a Pune-based animator.

== Music ==
Vikram Vedha

Soundtrack album by Vishal–Shekhar and Sam C. S.
- Released: 5 October 2022
- Recorded: 2021–2022
- Genre: Feature film soundtrack
- Length: 14:50
- Language: Hindi
- Label: T-Series
- Producer: Meghdeep Bose
External audio
- Vikram Vedha (Jukebox) on YouTube

Singles from Vikram Vedha
- 1. "Alcoholia" Released: 17 September 2022; 2. "Bande" Released: 26 September 2022; 3. "Oo Saahiba" Released: 2 October 2022; 4. "Yaara" Released: 10 October 2022

The film's soundtrack composed by Vishal–Shekhar and Sam C. S., the latter who scored the original Tamil film. The first single "Alcoholia" was released on 17 September 2022, and the second single "Bande" on 26 September 2022. The songs "Alcoholia" and "Oo Saahiba" were arranged and produced by music producer Meghdeep Bose.

All lyrics are written by Manoj Muntashir.

Track listing
No.	Title	Music	Singer(s)	Length
1.	"Alcoholia"	Vishal–Shekhar	Snigdhajit Bhowmik, Ananya Chakraborty	3:51
2.	"Bande"	Sam C. S.	Sivam	3:13
3.	"Oo Saahiba"	Vishal–Shekhar	Shekhar Ravjiani	3:54
4.	"Yaara"	Sam C. S.	Armaan Malik	3:52
Total length:				14:50

== Marketing ==
The film's teaser trailer was released on 24 August 2022. On YouTube, it received over one million likes in less than 24 hours, surpassing War (2019) as the most-liked teaser for a Hindi film.

== Release ==
=== Theatrical ===
Vikram Vedha was theatrically released worldwide on 30 September 2022, during the Navratri, Gandhi Jayanti and pre-Dussehra occasions. Ahead of the release, Reliance Entertainment obtained a wide-ranging injunction from the Madras High Court to protect the film's copyright. Indian internet service providers were ordered by the court to pre-emptively block over 13,000 websites that Reliance believed were likely to host illegal copies of the film based on their histories of "non-compliant" operations, even before it was publicly released.

=== Home media ===
The film premiered on JioCinema on 12 May 2023 in Hindi and dubbed versions of Bengali and Marathi languages.

== Reception ==
=== Box office ===
As of 9 November 2022 the film grossed over ₹79 crore (US$8.2 million) in India for a worldwide gross collection of over ₹135.03 crore (US$14 million). The film underperformed at the box office, which Ganesh Aaglave of Firstpost attributed to audiences having possibly seen the original Tamil film with subtitles or its dubbed Hindi version, while Kusumika Das of Zoom believes it was due to a box-office clash with Ponniyin Selvan: I.

=== Critical response ===
Vikram Vedha received positive reviews from critics and audience. On the review aggregator website Rotten Tomatoes, 78% of 18 critics' reviews are positive, with an average rating of 6.7/10.

Bollywood Hungama rated the film 4 out of 5 stars and wrote "Vikram Vedha is a brilliant massy fare that works due to the strong writing, unpredictable moments, Hrithik Roshan and Saif Ali Khan's outstanding performances and the electrifying background score". Sanchita Jhunjhunwala of Times Now rated the film 4 out of 5 stars and wrote "There are ample of highs in the movie, including the narrative that builds up, the setting that the makers have put together, and the so many characters involved. The film boasts of some absolutely mind-blowing shots, and due credits to the director duo for the same". Tushar Joshi of India Today rated the film 3.5 out of 5 stars and wrote "Vikram Vedha is unapologetically massy. It's also a lot of fun, and with two rock-solid performers like Hrithik and Saif". Rachana Dubey of The Times of India rated the film 3.5 out of 5 stars and wrote "Hrithik is menacing, ruthless and extremely emotional in parts. Pushkar-Gayathri, have pretty much stuck to the blue-print they created for the original, It's a plus that they haven't changed the roadmap too much". Dishya Sharma of News18 rated the film 3.5 out of 5 stars and wrote "Vikram Vedha is a massy film that serves as a fun single-screen theatre experience. I'd suggest caving into Pushkar and Gayathri's make-believe world and joining Vikram and Vedha's cat and mouse chase". Mugdha Kapoor of DNA India rated the film 3.5 out of 5 stars and wrote "Hrithik Roshan and Saif Ali Khan exude a level of comfort that only two very secure actors could portray onscreen". Devesh Sharma of Filmfare rated the film 3.5 out of 5 stars and wrote "Watch the film for its stylised action scenes. The Parkour sequence involving Hrithik is action choreography at its imaginative best. And also for the rock solid performances by both Saif Ali Khan and Hrithik Roshan".

Sukanya Verma of Rediff.com rated the film 3.5 out of 5 stars and wrote "A screenplay and superstar in perfect tandem, it doesn't get better than this". Ritika Handoo of Zee News rated the film 3.5 out of 5 stars and wrote "A mass entertainer, the film shows some sturdy technical work, especially the pithy camerawork. The lines between right and wrong blur in the film, so the cinematographer P.S. Vinod effectively brings out the essence of Kanpur and Lucknow as he holds the pulse of the leading lines in his frames". Stutee Ghosh of The Quint rated the film 3.5 out of 5 stars and wrote "Hritik and Saif seem to be really enjoying themselves. It's their self-assured presence that keeps us hooked even when the pacing falters or the film seems too stretched for its own good". Mahpara Kabir of ABP News rated the film 3.5 out of 5 stars and wrote "Vikram Vedha is a complete masala entertainer with apt amount of action, drama and thought-provoking introspection. Thriving in high-octane action, it's a delight to watch Hrithik Roshan and Saif Ali Khan on the big screen after a long time. The film loaded with power-packed performance by two of the most suave looking actors". Sanyukta Thakare of Mashable rated the film 3.5 out of 5 stars and wrote "Vikram Vedha is certainly the watch for this week, with a rare balance of visuals, story and performances".

Bharathi Pradhan of Lehren rated the film 3.5 out of 5 stars and termed the film as "double victory". "In which one is the compelling performances of Saif and Hrithik. The second is the unique, layered style of the husband-and-wife duo, awesomeness in the visuals and in the action, played out with a signature background score". Prateek Sur of Outlook rated the film 3.5 out of 5 stars and wrote "They've not tried to ape, but stayed true to the original and given the entertainment quotient the highest priority. It may have a few shortcomings with its length and music-choreography, but otherwise, it's a solid film". Shubhra Gupta of The Indian Express rated the film 3 out of 5 stars and wrote "After a long time, two top-flight stars such as Hrithik Roshan and Saif Ali Khan sink their teeth into a proper story which comes before them". Abhimanyu Mathur of Hindustan Times stated "Vikram Vedha works as both a thriller and a masala action flick. It is enjoyable and even manages a few whistles and claps in a packed hall". Saibal Chatterjee of NDTV rated the film 3 out of 5 stars and wrote "Saif Ali Khan makes a far better Vikram. Hrithik Roshan harnesses his star appeal and screen presence to deliver the goods". R Krishnakumar of Deccan Herald rated the film 3 out of 5 stars and wrote "Vikram Vedha needed some more of that kind of inspired madness to take it beyond what it ends up as: an almost satisfactory, risk-free remake". Anna M. M. Vetticad of Firstpost rated the film 2.5 out of 5 stars and wrote "This Hindi Vikram Vedha retains the swag of the Tamil original, but some minor changes in it are curious in what they reveal about the team's assessment of north Indian viewers". Manjusha Radhakrishnan of Gulf News rated the film 3.5 out of 5 stars and termed it as a "hero-laden visual spectacle".

== Accolades ==
Event	Category	Recipient(s)	Outcome	Ref.
68th Filmfare Awards	Best Actor	Hrithik Roshan	Nominated	
68th Filmfare Awards	Best Dialogue	Manoj Muntashir and B. A. Fida	Nominated	
68th Filmfare Awards	Best Background Score	Sam C. S.	Nominated	
68th Filmfare Awards	Best Cinematography	P. S. Vinod	Nominated	
68th Filmfare Awards	Best Production Design	Durga Prasad Mahapatra	Nominated	
68th Filmfare Awards	Best Sound Design	Leslie Fernandes	Nominated	
68th Filmfare Awards	Best Action	Parvez Shaikh	Won	
68th Filmfare Awards	Best Choreography	Ganesh Hegde	Nominated	
23rd IIFA Awards	Best Actor	Hrithik Roshan	Won	
