= Cloud Nine Movies =

Indian film production company

Cloud Nine Movies Pvt. Ltd
- Company type: Film production Film distribution
- Industry: Films
- Founded: 2008
- Defunct: 2014
- Headquarters: Chennai, Tamil Nadu, India
- Key people: Dayanidhi Azhagiri; Vivek Rathinavel
- Parent: Kalaignar TV

Cloud Nine Movies was an Indian film production and distribution company, based in Chennai. It is owned by Dayanidhi Azhagiri and Vivek Rathinavel and was founded in 2008 until 2014. He founded another new production company in 2013, Meeka Entertainment.

== History ==
The company first distributed the Gautham Vasudev Menon-directed Vaaranam Aayiram in 2008, which was a critical as well as commercial success. Next they produced the parody film Tamizh Padam, which became a box-office hit, too, following which Paiyaa was distributed. The N. Linguswamy-directed romantic-action film, starring Karthi, also went to become highly successful at the box office, emerging one of the highest-grossing Tamil films of that year. Subsequently, their next film was the action-drama film Thoonga Nagaram starring Vimal and Anjali becoming their first production. Simultaneously, they first produced Venkat Prabhu directorial's next film, which stars Ajith Kumar as part of an ensemble cast, but later sold the movie to Studio Green for a whopping price. Later, there was news that they sold the movie to Sun Pictures, and satellite signal also sold to Sun Pictures. But its official now that Cloud Nine Movies and Sun Pictures are presenting it.

== Filmography ==
=== Production ===
Year	Title	Actors	Language	Notes
2010	Tamizh Padam	Shiva, Disha Pandey	Tamil	Released 29 January 2010
2011	Thoonga Nagaram	Vimal, Bharani, Nishanth, Anjali	Tamil	Released 4 February 2011
2011	Mankatha	Ajith Kumar, Trisha Krishnan	Tamil	Released 31 August 2011
2013	Thagaraaru		Tamil	Released 6 December 2013; Final Film

=== Distribution ===
Year	Title	Actors	Language	Notes
2008	Vaaranam Aayiram	Surya Sivakumar, Divya Spandana, Sameera Reddy	Tamil	Released 14 November 2008
2010	Tamizh Padam	Shiva, Disha Pandey	Tamil	Released 29 January 2010
2010	Paiyaa	Karthik Sivakumar, Tamannaah Bhatia, Milind Soman	Tamil	Released 2 April 2010
2010	Naan Mahaan Alla	Karthik Sivakumar, Kajal Aggarwal	Tamil	Released 20 August 2010
2010	Va	Shiva, Lekha Washington	Tamil	Released 5 November 2010
2010	Ratha Charithram	Surya Sivakumar, Priyamani	Tamil	Tamil version only Released 3 December 2010
2011	Vaanam	Silambarasan, Bharath, Anushka, Prakash Raj, Saranya	Tamil	Release 29 April 2011
2011	Azhagarsamiyin Kudhirai	Appukutty, Saranya Mohan	Tamil	Release 12 May 2011
