= Lekha Washington =

Indian actress, artist, and product designer (born 1986)

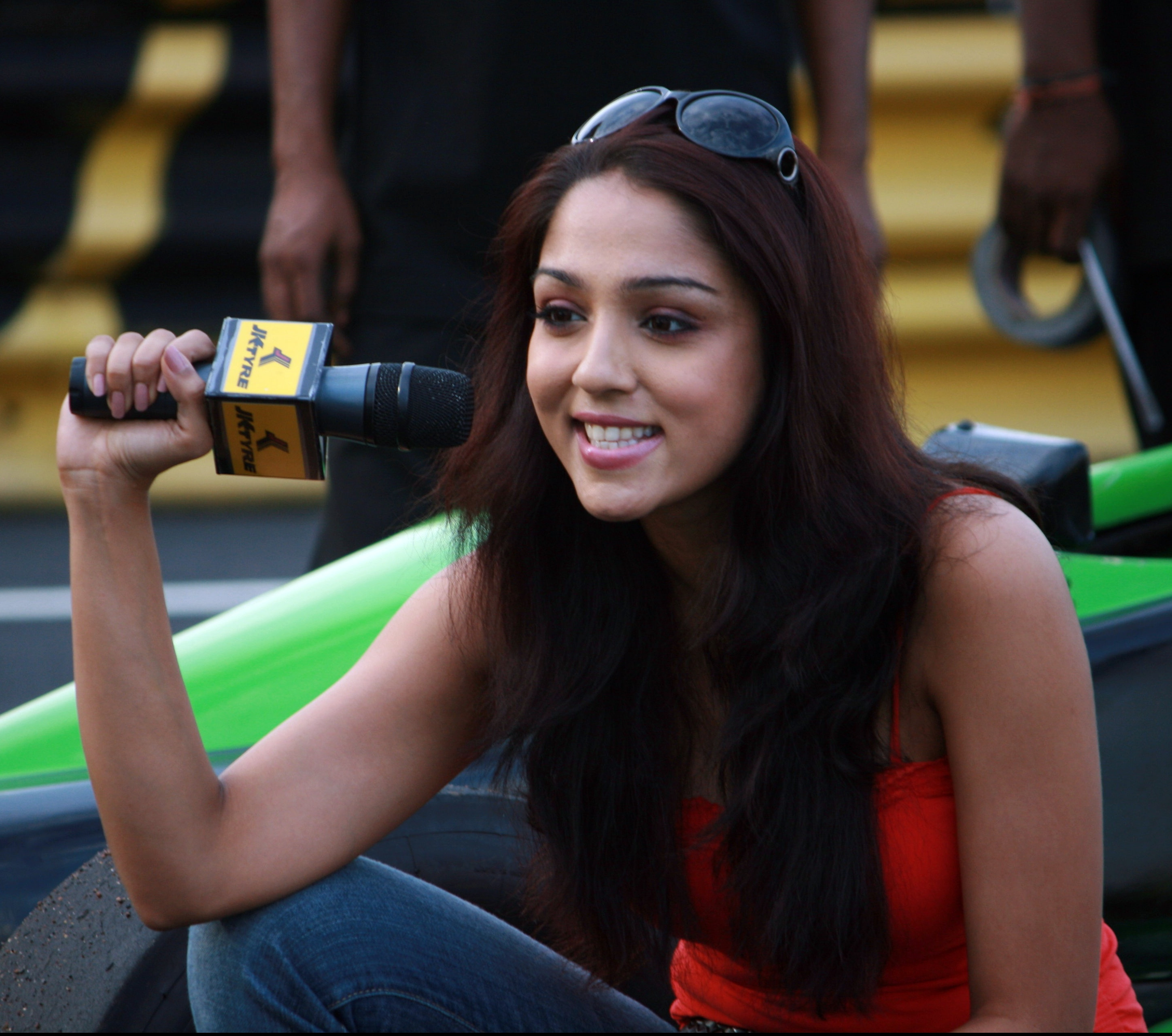
- Washington in 2008
- Born: 30 April 1984 (age 42)
- Education: Stella Maris College, Chennai and National Institutes of Design
- Occupations: Actor, product designer, artist, lyricist
- Years active: 2007–2017
- Partners: Pablo Chatterji (former); Imran Khan (present)

Lekha Washington (born 30 April 1986) is an Indian actress, artist, and product designer who has predominantly appeared in Tamil and Telugu language films as well as a few Hindi films. She was first recognised for her work as a sculptor in 2002 and then as a theatre actress in Chennai based stage plays. After appearing as a video jockey with SS Music, Washington's breakthrough film role was as an independent estranged sister in Jayamkondaan (2008), whilst she has gone on to portray roles in the multi-starrer Vedam and the comedy Va.

== Early life ==
Lekha Washington was born to a father of mixed Burmese, Italian and Punjabi ancestry, and a Maharashtrian mother. Despite the mixed heritage, Lekha has stated she considers herself South Indian due to her upbringing in Chennai and speaks English and Marathi at home.

Washington did her schooling in Good Shepherd Convent, Chennai and later pursued a degree in Fine Arts at Stella Maris College, Chennai and went on to attend the National Institute of Design taking courses, first in Lifestyle Product Design, and then re-applying to enrol in the Film and Video Communication course. During her time studying film-making, she opted for a career in "front of the camera, rather than from behind". During her time on the course, she made three short films called Spoonerism, Catch 22 and Sunn with locations ranging from Myanmar to Mauritius.

== Acting career ==
While pursuing her education, she decided to appear in Chetan Shah's experimental English film, Framed, and subsequently received offers to be a music video jockey from SS Music. In early 2007, Washington was signed on to play the lead role of an orthodox Tamil Brahmin girl alongside Silambarasan in his project Kettavan, after the actor and the film's director Nanthu had spotted her at a cinema hall. She replaced the team's original choice Sana Khan in the lead role, but despite completing a schedule, the film was shelved and later cancelled after the lead actor and director had creative differences. She had earlier made an uncredited appearance in a song from the 1999 romance film Kadhalar Dhinam and also made a guest appearance in director Jeeva's 2007 film Unnale Unnale as a bride at a wedding. In November 2007, Washington signed on to play a supporting role in R. Kannan's directorial debut Jayamkondaan alongside Vinay Rai and Bhavana (actress). Appearing as Vinay Rai's estranged half sister, Brindha, in the film, Washington won critical acclaim for her role with a reviewer citing that she "sparkles as the half sister in a well etched role" and is "the surprise packet and has the credentials to make it big". Another critics cited that Washington "pulls off with élan" and "her costume spells class and character as does her performance", and subsequently the film went on to become a critical and commercial success.

In 2010, Washington appeared in three films in three regional languages. Her first release was in the multi-starrer Vedam, where she played a role as a part of the troupe of a lead character, Manoj Manchu. The film won positive reviews, and Washington's small role was labelled as "adequate support" by critics, as the film enjoyed a successful run commercially. She then appeared in Pushkar-Gayathri's comedy film, Va, playing a suicidal schoolgirl who meets the characters of Shiva and Charan on an election night in Chennai. The film received average reviews, whilst Washington's portrayal also received mixed acclaim with a reviewer citing that she "carries off her role of a dimwit quite well", whilst another cites that she "does not impress and needs to brush up her acting skills and lip sync". Her final release of the year was the romantic Kannada film, Huduga Hudugi opposite Sameer Dattani, which became a commercial and critical failure, with Washington receiving mixed reviews for her role.

Washington was signed on to appear in her debut Hindi film, John Owen's Peter Gaya Kaam Se beating hundred other actresses in an audition, after the producers felt that "she looked like a supermodel, could play football and was an Anglo-Indian". The film opposite Rajeev Khandelwal features Washington as Mira, an undercover agent, but is yet to release, after disputes between the producers and the director. She has also shot for another Hindi project, Power by Rajkumar Santoshi, featuring her as Sneha alongside Amitabh Bachchan, Anil Kapoor, Sanjay Dutt and Ajay Devgan, though the film has been delayed. In 2013, Washington was seen in Matru Ki Bijlee Ka Mandola as Imran Khan's friend. She won acclaim for her portrayal of a Tamil Brahmin bride in the romantic comedy Kalyana Samayal Saadham (2013), before portraying a guest role in the action thriller Arima Nambi (2014).

== Artistic career ==
Alongside her work in film, Washington has developed a parallel career as a product designer and installation artist. A graduate of the National Institute of Design (NID), she moved from design into acting before returning to furniture and object design and launching her label Ajji in Mumbai, which she has described as a way to pursue her ideas in product and functional art.

Her early furniture and object designs under Ajji included sculptural pieces such as the Pink Sink chair, Squair, the modular Dot and Atom units and the Drop chair, which have been exhibited through design stores and covered in the press as examples of “quirky” furniture that blurs the line between functional design and art.

Washington’s design work gained wider recognition when she was named Young Talent (joint winner) at the 2015 EDIDA (ELLE DECO International Design Awards) India, a distinction that also gave her the opportunity to show her products at the Ambiente fair in Frankfurt.

Her studio practice has been profiled as a hybrid living and working space in a restored 150-year-old bungalow in Ranwar Village, Bandra, described as a multi-functional environment for furniture, functional art and large-scale installations. India Today has similarly characterised her as part of a generation of “rebel” product designers experimenting with unconventional forms and materials.

Beyond furniture, Washington has created public and installation works around a recurring moon motif. In 2021 she produced Chand, a 12-foot-wide steel orb installed above a junction near Carter Road in Bandra, Mumbai; India Today described the work as “bringing the moon down to Bandra”, while the RPG Art Foundation lists Chand among its public art projects in the city.

Her lunar-themed work has also extended to international festivals. The EDIDA profile noted in 2016 that she was experimenting with technology-driven art installations, including a planned work for the Burning Man festival. In 2018, Burning Man’s official Journal documented an Honoraria artwork titled This Too Shall Pass – Moondancer by Washington, describing it as an installation from India that appeared as a second moon over Black Rock City. In a 2024 interview she referred to creating a “second moon” for Burning Man, seen by tens of thousands of people, as one of her most important artistic experiences and said she hoped to continue working at that scale by integrating performance and installation.

Washington returned to Burning Man as an Honoraria artist in 2022 with The Apocalypse is Breathtaking: Flame of the Forest, which the Burning Man Journal describes as a Japanese-inspired sculptural tree reflecting on climate and ecological themes. In the Moneycontrol interview she characterised her current work as a “thriving” artistic practice exploring nature and abstraction and expressed a desire to continue creating large-scale installations that bring together performance, technology and public participation.

== Other work ==
Washington has also been involved in English stage plays held in Chennai, featuring in Madras Player's production of Twelfth Night in 2002 as Viola. She has also been active in directing the theatre troupe, Khel.

During the maiden season of the Indian Premier League, Washington was signed on to anchor an analysis and interview show which provided coverage of the cricket played. To prepare for the role, Washington did research through cricketing journals and enlisted help from Ajay Jadeja, hoping for her reporting to reach a widespread audience. Notably during her time as a reporter, she was briefly criticised for asking umpire Asad Rauf which franchise he had rooted for, as a part of a joke. However, her stint was considered successful and helped her gain more offers from film producers.

== Personal life ==
An agnostic, Washington in 2011 revealed that "organised religion scares [her]". She believes in karma.

Several media reports from 2017 noted that Lekha Washington had been in a long-term relationship with Pablo Chatterji, with coverage describing a private “marriage-ish” ceremony held in Alibaug in November that year. However, the reports did not confirm a legal marriage, and mainstream publications later clarified that she had separated from a partner — not a husband — as earlier rumours had suggested.

In 2024, Washington publicly confirmed her relationship with actor Imran Khan in interviews where both stated that they were “mutually, madly in love.”

== Filmography ==
Year	Film	Role	Language	Notes
1999	Kadhalar Dhinam	Girl at Computer	Tamil	Cameo appearance in "O Maria" song
2004	Yuva	Girl at embassy	Hindi	Cameo appearance
2007	Framed	Vini	English	
2007	Unnale Unnale	Bride at a Wedding	Tamil	Cameo appearance in "Ilamai Ullasam" song
2008	Jayamkondaan	Brinda Sekhar	Tamil	Nominated, Vijay Award for Best Supporting Actress
2010	Vedam	Lasya	Telugu	
2010	Va	Saraswathi	Tamil	
2010	Huduga Hudugi	Sonia	Kannada	
2013	Matru Ki Bijlee Ka Mandola	Kamini	Hindi	Cameo appearance
2013	Kamina	Vasuki	Telugu	
2013	Kalyana Samayal Saadham	Meera Chandrasekaran	Tamil	
2014	Arima Nambi	Megha Sharma	Tamil	Guest appearance
2014	Peter Gaya Kaam Se	Mira	Hindi	

=== As lyricist ===
- Rangoon (2017) (Note: Wrote the lyrics for two songs: "Shimmy Shake" and "Be Still")

Washington wrote the English-language lyrics for two songs in Vishal Bhardwaj’s film Rangoon (2017), contributing the tracks “Be Still” and “Shimmy Shake” to the soundtrack.
