= Dayanidhi Azhagiri =

Indian cinema producer

Dhayanidhi
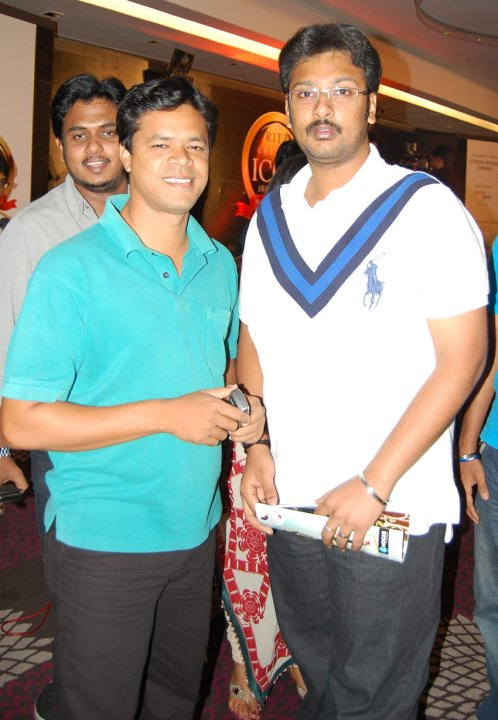
- Born: Dhayanidhi Alagiri; Chennai, Tamil Nadu, India
- Spouse: Anusha Dhayanidhi
- Children: 2
- Parent(s): M. K. Alagiri, Kanthi Alagiri
- Relatives: M. Karunanidhi (grandfather); M. K. Stalin (paternal uncle); Udhayanidhi Stalin (cousin); Arulnithi Tamilarasu (cousin)

Dhayanidhi Azhagiri is an Indian film producer and distributor active in Tamil cinema. He is the owner of the Cloud Nine Movies banner. His paternal grandfather was M. Karunanidhi, the former Chief Minister of Tamil Nadu. His father is M. K. Alagiri, the former Minister of Chemicals and Fertilizers.

== Personal life ==
Dayanidhi married Chennai-based Advocate Anusha on 18 November 2010. They have a two sons named Rudra Dev and Vedanth.

== Controversy ==
A case has been filed against Dayanidhi in connection with an estimated Rs.16,000 crore mining scam. His bank accounts have been frozen, a look out notice has been issued against him and he is also being looked for by the Immigration Department. He has been absconding. A district court in Madurai has issued a non bailable warrant against Dayanidhi in connection with the illegal granite quarrying scam. All his relatives have claimed ignorance about his whereabouts. TN police is contemplating to declare him as a proclaimed offender.

== Filmography ==
Year	Title	Actors	Role	Notes
2008	Vaaranam Aayiram	Suriya, Simran, Divya Spandana, Sameera Reddy	Distributor	
2010	Tamizh Padam	Shiva, Disha Pandey	Producer	
2010	Paiyaa	Karthi, Tamannaah Bhatia, Milind Soman	Distributor	
2010	Naan Mahaan Alla	Karthi, Kajal Aggarwal	Distributor	
2010	Raththa Sarithiram	Suriya, Vivek Oberoi, Priyamani	Distributor	Tamil version of Rakta Charitra
2011	Thoonga Nagaram	Vimal, Bharani, Nishanth, Anjali	Producer	
2011	Vaanam	Silambarasan, Bharath, Anushka, Sonia Agarwal, Prakash Raj, Saranya	Distributor	
2011	Azhagarsamiyin Kudhirai	AppuKutty, Saranya Mohan, Soori	Distributor	
2011	Mankatha	Ajith Kumar, Trisha Krishnan, Arjun Sarja	Producer	Winner ITFA Best Movie Award
2013	Udhayam NH4	Siddharth, Ashrita Shetty	Producer	
2013	Thagaraaru	Arulnithi, Poorna,	Producer	
2014	Vadacurry	Jai, Swati Reddy	Producer	Under Meeka Entertainment

== Awards ==
International Tamil Film Awards (ITFA)

- Best Producer - Mankatha

== See also ==
- Cloud Nine Movies
