= Shiva (actor) =

Indian film actor, comedian, radio jockey, dialogue writer

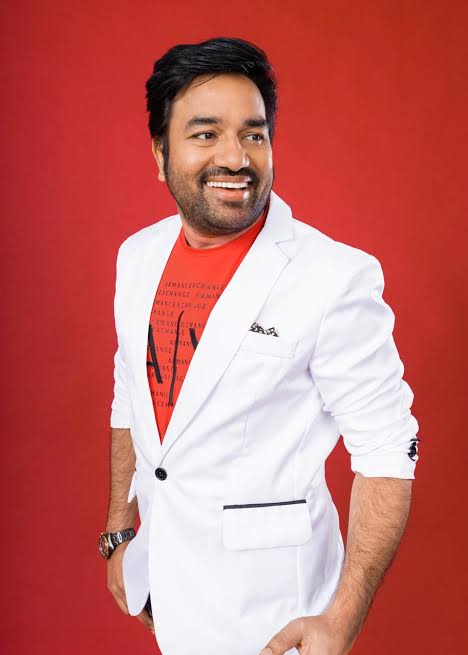
- Shiva
- Born: 10 December 1982 (age 43)
- Other name: Mirchi Shiva
- Occupations: Actor; radio jockey; dialogue writer
- Years active: 2001–present
- Spouse: Priya (m. 2012)
- Children: 2

Shiva is an Indian actor and dialogue writer who appears in Tamil films. Prior to his acting career, Shiva worked as a radio jockey with Radio Mirchi. His tenure earned him the nickname Mirchi Shiva. Acting mainly in comedy films, he rose to fame following his performances in the Venkat Prabhu directorials Chennai 600028 (2007) and Saroja (2008). He is humorously known by fans as "Agila Ulaga Superstar" (worldwide superstar) after his hilarious spoof on Tamil cinema's portrayal in Tamizh Padam (2010).

== Film career ==
Shiva's first film role was a supporting role in the 2001 film 12B, where he played Shaam's friend. He debuted as a lead actor in Venkat Prabhu's 2007 sports comedy Chennai 600028 alongside several stars. His next role, again under Venkat's direction, Saroja (2008). Both films were box office hits.

Shiva then starred in Tamizh Padam (2010), a full-length parody of contemporary Tamil cinema, and his performance earned rave reviews. His comedy Va Quarter Cutting, was an average grosser. His first 2011 release became the long-delayed romantic drama Pathinaaru, which was his first non-comedy venture. During the period, he also completed another comedy film titled Siva Poojaiyil Karadi, by Rama Narayanan, but the film was never released.

In 2012, he featured alongside Vimal in Sundar C's comedy film Kalakalappu, which won positive reviews and performed well commercially. Portraying the role of the small-time crook Raghu, critics noted that Shiva was the film's "scene-stealer" and "carries the first half with his quips". The success of the film fetched the actor more scripts and Shiva went on to feature in four comedies in 2013. His first release Thillu Mullu, a remake of the 1981 Rajinikanth starrer, featured him alongside Isha Talwar and Prakash Raj and also fared well commercially. The actor also won positive portrayal of a conman with a critic noting that "Shiva has taken the entire film in his shoulders and has given his best. His comic timing is perfect and the one-liners are hilarious." His second release of the year Sonna Puriyathu, where he played a dubbing artist, also won good reviews. Sudhish Kamath of The Hindu praised the actor's performance noting that "Nobody makes silly jokes work with a straight face like Shiva does", also that he is the "funny man pretending to be important". The next release Ya Ya, featured him alongside Santhanam in the lead role. Shiva was next seen in Kiruthiga Udhayanidhi's directorial debut Vanakkam Chennai, a romantic musical opposite Priya Anand. The film received positive to mixed reviews.

In 2015, he starred in two films with Masala Padam and 144. In 2016, his films were Adra Machan Visilu and Chennai 600028 II, a sequel sports comedy to Chennai 600028. In 2018, Kalakalappu 2, the sequel to that film Kalakalappu, has been released, directed by the same Sundar C. After a gap of eight years, C. S. Amudhan's Tamizh Padam 2 (2018) has released, amidst high expectations. His voiceover has also appeared in films such as Vandi (2018) and Charlie Chaplin 2 (2019).

In 2022, Shiva made his comeback with a horror-comedy movie Idiot. In 2023, he had two released in Single Shankarum Smartphone Simranum and Kasethan Kadavulada. In 2024, Shiva, in his usual quirky style, opens up the dusty box from the sequel 2013 original and tries to revive his ‘kidnapping’ business after a jail term in Soodhu Kavvum 2. In 2025, the sports comedy Sumo as well as the musical road Paranthu Po was released.

== Personal life ==
Shiva married his long time girlfriend and former national level badminton player Priya on 15 November 2012. They have a son, Agasthya, and a daughter, Meera.

== Filmography ==
Key
†	Denotes films that have not yet been released

=== As actor ===
List of Shiva film credits
Year	Title	Role	Notes
2001	12B	Shakti's co-worker	Uncredited role
2001	Nayak: The Real Hero	Crowd member	Hindi film; uncredited role
2001	Aalavandhan	Partygoer	Uncredited role
2003	Whistle	Jeeva's friend	Uncredited role
2007	Chennai 600028	Karthik	Nominated, Vijay Award for Best Debut Actor
2008	Saroja	Ajay Raj	
2010	Tamizh Padam	Shiva	
2010	Va	Sunderrajan (Sura)	
2011	Pathinaaru	Shiva	
2011	Ko	Himself	Special appearance
2012	Kalakalappu	Raghu	
2013	Thillu Mullu	Pasupathy (Ganguly Kanthan)	
2013	Sonna Puriyathu	Shiva	
2013	Ya Ya	Ramarajan "Ram" (Dhoni)	
2013	Vanakkam Chennai	Madasamy (Ajay)	
2015	Masala Padam	Mani	
2015	144	Thesu	
2016	Adra Machan Visilu	"Simmakkal" Shekar	
2016	Chennai 600028 II	Karthik	
2018	Kalakalappu 2	Ganesh	
2018	Tamizh Padam 2	Shiva / Barathamuni	
2018	Party †	Babu Murali / Bob Marley	Unreleased Film
2022	Naai Sekar	Padaiyappa	Voice only
2022	Idiot	Chinnarasu, Paandi and Thor	
2023	Single Shankarum Smartphone Simranum	Shankar	
2023	Kasethan Kadavulada	Ramu	
2024	Soodhu Kavvum 2	Gurunath "Guru"	
2025	Sumo	Shiva	also screenplay and dialogues
2025	Paranthu Po	Gokul	

=== Television ===
List of performances and appearances on television
Year	Title	Role(s)	Network	Notes	Ref.
2014	3rd South Indian International Movie Awards	Host	Sun TV	Co-hosted with Pooja Ramachandran	
2015	4th South Indian International Movie Awards	Host	Sun TV	Co-hosted with Suchitra	
2016	5th South Indian International Movie Awards	Host	Sun TV	Co-hosted with Sathish	
2018	Colors Super Kids	Host	Colors Tamil	—	
2019	8th South Indian International Movie Awards	Host	Sun TV	Co-hosted with Janani Iyer	
2019	Bigil audio launch	Host	Sun TV	Co-hosted with VJ Ramya	
2019	Sun Kudumbam Virudhugal	Himself	Sun TV	Appeared in a TV serial spoof video, portraying a doctor	
2022	10th South Indian International Movie Awards	Host	Sun TV	Co-hosted with VJ Ramya	

=== As lyricist ===
- "Saudi Baasha" (Va)
- "Rosa Hai" (Sonna Puriyathu)

=== As singer ===
- "Rosa Hai" (Sonna Puriyathu)

=== As writer ===
List of Shiva film credits
Year	Title	Notes
2014	Aadama Jaichomada	dialogues
2025	Sumo	Screenplay and dialogues

=== As narrator ===
- Vandi (2018)
- Charlie Chaplin 2 (2019)
