= Nayanthara filmography =

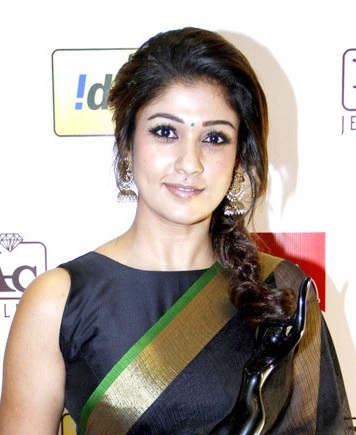
- Nayanthara in 2014
- Film: 89

Indian actress and film producer Nayanthara works in Tamil, Telugu and Malayalam films. She made her acting debut with Sathyan Anthikad's Malayalam film Manassinakkare in 2003, after the success, she became a popular star in the Malayalam industry. She did two more Malayalam films the following year: Shaji Kailas' Natturajavu, and Fazil's psychological thriller Vismayathumbathu. Nayanthara's first appearance in a non-Malayalam film was Hari's Tamil film Ayya which released in 2005. While shooting for the film, she was cast in another Tamil film Chandramukhi, after its director P. Vasu's wife had seen Manassinakkare and recommended her. The film ran for over 100 days in theatres, eventually turning Nayanthara into one of the most-sought after actresses in Tamil cinema.

Nayanthara made her Telugu cinema debut with Lakshmi in 2006, and followed this with another Telugu film, Boss the same year. She appeared in four Tamil films that year: Kalvanin Kadhali, Vallavan, Thalaimagan and E. Nayanthara received praise for her performance in Billa (2007). The success of that film led to Sify describing her as "the glamour queen of Tamil cinema". Her 2008 release Yaaradi Nee Mohini was her only successful film as a lead actress that year. She had three releases in 2009: Villu, Anjaneyulu and Aadhavan. In 2010, all her releases, which featured her as the female lead, turned out to be commercial successes: she had five box office hits in the four Southern languages – Adhurs (Telugu), Body Guard (Malayalam), Simha (Telugu), Boss Engira Bhaskaran (Tamil) and the Kannada film Super, which marked her first appearance in Kannada cinema. Her performances in Simha, Boss Engira Bhaskaran and Super eventually fetched her nominations for the Filmfare Best Actress Award in the respective languages.

In 2011, Nayanthara portrayed Sita in Sri Rama Rajyam, based on an episode in the Hindu epic Ramayana, for which she won the Filmfare Award for Best Actress – Telugu. Her performance in Krishnam Vande Jagadgurum (2012) earned her another nomination in the same category. She won the Filmfare Award for Best Actress – Tamil for Raja Rani (2013) Naanum Rowdy Dhaan (2015), and Aramm (2017), and was nominated for the same for Iru Mugan (2016). She is also recognised for having made women centric films mainstream in the south Indian industries. She has starred in commercially and critically acclaimed female-led films like Maya (2015), Puthiya Niyamam (2016), Aramm (2017), Kolamaavu Kokila (2018), Imaikkaa Nodigal (2018),Mookuthi Amman (2020), Netrikann (2021). She is also known for her Various roles in Rappakkal (2005), Vallavan (2006), Lakshmi (2006),Aadhavan (2009),Krishnam Vande Jagadgurum (2012), Arrambam (2013), Naanum Rowdy Dhaan(2015), Thani Oruvan (2015), Velaikkaran (2017), Jai Simha (2018), Kolamaavu Kokila (2018), Imaikkaa Nodigal (2018), Viswasam (2019), Love Action Drama (2019), Sye Raa Narasimha Reddy (2019), Bigil (2019), Mookuthi Amman (2020), Nizhal (2021), Annaatthe (2021), Kaathuvaakula Rendu Kaadhal (2022) and Godfather (2022). Nayanthara's highest grossing release came with Jawan (2023), which marked her debut in Hindi cinema. She has appeared in 94 films, including of cameo appearances, in all Tamil, Telugu, Malayalam, Kannada and Hindi cinemas.

== Film ==
Key
†	Denotes films that have not yet been released

List of Nayanthara films and roles
Year	Title	Role(s)	Language(s)	Notes	Ref.
2003	Manassinakkare	Gouri	Malayalam		
2004	Vismayathumbathu	Reetha Mathews	Malayalam		
2004	Natturajavu	Katrina	Malayalam		
2005	Ayya	Selvi	Tamil		
2005	Chandramukhi	Durga	Tamil		
2005	Thaskara Veeran	Thankamani	Malayalam		
2005	Rappakal	Gouri	Malayalam		
2005	Ghajini	Chitra	Tamil		
2005	Sivakasi	Herself	Tamil	Special appearance in the song "Kodambakkam Area"	
2006	Lakshmi	Nandhini	Telugu		
2006	Kalvanin Kadhali	Haritha	Tamil		
2006	E	Jyothi	Tamil		
2006	Thalaimagan	Mekala	Tamil		
2006	Vallavan	Swapna	Tamil		
2006	Boss	Anuradha	Telugu		
2007	Yogi	Nandini	Telugu		
2007	Dubai Seenu	Madhumathi	Telugu		
2007	Sivaji: The Boss	Herself	Tamil	Special appearance in the song "Balleilakka"	
2007	Tulasi	Vasundhara Ram	Telugu		
2007	Billa	Sasha	Tamil		
2008	Yaaradi Nee Mohini	Keerthi (Komalavalli) (Note: Nayanthara played a character with two names.)	Tamil		
2008	Kuselan / Kathanayakudu	Herself	Tamil; Telugu	Bilingual film; guest appearance	
2008	Satyam / Salute	Deivanayaki aka Deiva (Tamil) / Divya (Telugu)	Tamil; Telugu	Bilingual film (Note: Nayanthara's scenes were shot in Tamil only.)	
2008	Twenty:20	Diana	Malayalam	Special appearance in the song "Hey Dil Deewana"	
2008	Aegan	Mallika	Tamil		
2009	Villu	Janvi	Tamil		
2009	Aadhavan	Thara	Tamil		
2009	Anjaneyulu	Anjali	Telugu		
2010	Adhurs	Chandrakala	Telugu		
2010	Simha	Gayatri	Telugu		
2010	Body Guard	Ammu	Malayalam		
2010	Elektra	Elektra Alexander	Malayalam		
2010	Goa	New village girl	Tamil	Guest appearance	
2010	Boss Engira Bhaskaran	Chandrika	Tamil		
2010	Super	Indira	Kannada		
2011	Sri Rama Rajyam	Sita / Lakshmi	Telugu		
2012	Krishnam Vande Jagadgurum	Devika	Telugu		
2013	Greeku Veerudu	Sandhya	Telugu		
2013	Ethir Neechal	Herself	Tamil	Special appearance in the song "Local Boys"	
2013	Raja Rani	Regina John	Tamil		
2013	Arrambam	Maya	Tamil		
2014	Idhu Kathirvelan Kadhal	Pavithra	Tamil		
2014	Anaamika / Nee Enge En Anbe	Anaamika	Telugu; Tamil	Bilingual film	
2015	Bhaskar the Rascal	Hima	Malayalam		
2015	Nannbenda	Ramya	Tamil		
2015	Massu Engira Masilamani	Malini	Tamil		
2015	Thani Oruvan	Mahima	Tamil		
2015	Maya	Maya Mathews, Apsara (Note: Nayanthara plays dual role.)	Tamil		
2015	Naanum Rowdy Dhaan	Kadambari	Tamil		
2015	Life of Josutty	Swapna	Malayalam	Cameo	
2016	Puthiya Niyamam	Vasuki Iyer	Malayalam		
2016	Babu Bangaram	Sailaja	Telugu		
2016	Idhu Namma Aalu	Myla	Tamil		
2016	Thirunaal	Vidya	Tamil		
2016	Iru Mugan	Meera George/ Rosy	Tamil		
2016	Kaashmora	Rathna Mahadevi	Tamil		
2017	Dora	Pavalakkodi	Tamil		
2017	Aramm	Madhivadhani	Tamil		
2017	Velaikkaran	Mrinalini	Tamil		
2018	Jai Simha	Gauri	Telugu		
2018	Kolamaavu Kokila	Kokila	Tamil		
2018	Imaikkaa Nodigal	Anjali Vikramadityan	Tamil		
2019	Viswasam	Niranjana	Tamil		
2019	Airaa	Bhavani, Yamuna	Tamil		
2019	Mr. Local	Keerthana Vasudevan	Tamil		
2019	Kolaiyuthir Kaalam	Shruthi Lawson	Tamil		
2019	Bigil	Angel Aasirvaatham	Tamil		
2019	Love Action Drama	Shobha	Malayalam		
2019	Sye Raa Narasimha Reddy	Siddhamma	Telugu		
2020	Darbar	Lilly	Tamil		
2020	Mookuthi Amman	Mookuthi Amman	Tamil		
2021	Nizhal	Sharmila	Malayalam		
2021	Aaradugula Bullet	Nayana	Telugu		
2021	Netrikann	Durga/ Nancy	Tamil		
2021	Annaatthe	Adv. Pattammal	Tamil		
2022	Kaathuvaakula Rendu Kaadhal	Kanmani Ganguly	Tamil		
2022	O2	Parvathy	Tamil		
2022	Connect	Susan	Tamil		
2022	Godfather	Sathyapriya Jaidev	Telugu		
2022	Gold	Sumangali Unnikrishnan	Malayalam		
2023	Jawan	Narmada Rai	Hindi	Partially reshot in Tamil	
2023	Iraivan	Priya	Tamil		
2023	Annapoorani: The Goddess of Food	Annapoorani Rangarajan	Tamil		
2024	Nayanthara: Beyond the Fairytale	Herself	Tamil	Netflix Documentary	
2025	Test	Kumudha Saravanan	Tamil		
2026	Mana Shankara Vara Prasad Garu	Sasirekha	Telugu		
2026	Patriot	Adv Lathika	Malayalam		
2026	Toxic	Ganga	Kannada; English	Bilingual film	
2026	Hi	Devayani	Tamil		
2026	Mookuthi Amman 2	Mookuthi Amman, Sakthi	Tamil		
2026	Dear Students †	Vidya Rudhran	Malayalam; Tamil	Bilingual film; Post-production	
2026	Rakkayie †	Rakkayie	Tamil	Filming	
2026	Mannangatti Since 1960 †	TBA	Tamil	Completed	
2027	#SVC63 †	TBA	Hindi	Filming	
2027	Dharman †	TBA	Tamil	Filming	

== Producer ==
Year	Title	Language(s)	Notes	Ref.
2021	Netrikann	Tamil		
2021	Rocky	Tamil	Presenter	
2021	Koozhangal / Pebbles	Tamil		
2022	Kaathu Vaakula Rendu Kaadhal	Tamil		
2022	Connect	Tamil		
2023	Shubh Yatra	Gujarati		
2026	Love Insurance Kompany	Tamil		
2026	Hi	Tamil		
2026	Mookuthi Amman 2	Tamil		

== See also ==
- List of awards and nominations received by Nayanthara
