= List of awards and nominations received by Nayanthara =

Nayanthara awards and nominations
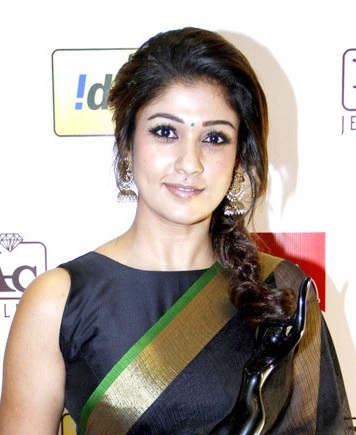
- Nayanthara at Filmfare Awards South 2014
Awards and nominations
Award	Wins	Nominations
CineMAA Awards	1	1
Edison Awards	4	11
Vikatan Awards	3	6
Filmfare Awards South	5	14
CIFF Awards	2	2
Nandi Awards	1	1
Santosham Film Awards	1	1
South Indian International Movie Awards	9	13
IIFA Utsavam Awards	1	3
Kalaimamani Awards	1	1
Tamil Nadu State Film Awards	3	3
Vijay Awards	6	9
Asianet Film Awards	2	3
Zee Cine Awards - Tamil	2	3
Others	3	1

Totals (Note: Certain award groups do not simply award one winner. They acknowledge several different recipients, have runners-up, and have third place. Since this is a specific recognition and is different from losing an award, runner-up mentions are considered wins in this award tally. For simplification and to avoid errors, each award in this list has been presumed to have had a prior nomination.)
- Wins: 53
- Nominations: 90

Nayanthara is an Indian actress, who primarily works in the South Indian film industries. She is the recipient of five Filmfare Awards South, as well as a Nandi award and a Kalaimamani from the state governments of Andhra Pradesh and Tamil Nadu respectively. She received most of the awards for her performance in the film Sri Rama Rajyam and Aramm. She's also referred as Lady Superstar of Indian Cinema due to impact made in south Indian industry.

== Ananda Vikatan Cinema Awards ==
Year	Artist/Work	Category	Result	Ref.
2015	Naanum Rowdy Dhaan	Best Actress	Won	
2017	Aramm	Best Actress	Won	
2019	Airaa	Best Actress	Nominated	
2022	Netrikann	Best Actress	Nominated	
2023	Connect	Best Actress	Nominated	
2024	Annapoorani: The Goddess of Food	Best Actress	Nominated	

== Asianet Film Awards ==
Year	Artist/Work	Category	Result	Ref.
2003	Manassinakkare	Best New Face of the Year	Won	
2010	Body Guard	Best Actress	Won	
2017	Puthiya Niyamam	Best Actress	Nominated	

== CineMAA Awards ==
Year	Artist/Work	Category	Result	Ref.
2011	Sri Rama Rajyam	Best Actress (Jury)	Won	

== Edison Awards (India) ==
Year	Artist/Work	Category	Result	Ref.
2013	Raja Rani	Best Actress	Won	
2015	Naanum Rowdy Dhaan	Best Actress	Won	
2015	Thani Oruvan	The Gorgeous Belle	Nominated	
2016	Iru Mugan	Best Actress	Nominated	
2017	Aramm	Best Actress	Won	
2018	Imaikkaa Nodigal	Best Actress	Won	
2019	Kolaiyuthir Kaalam	Best Actress	Nominated	
2019	Bigil & Viswasam	Favorite Actress	Nominated	
2020	Mookuthi Amman	Favorite Actress	Nominated	
2021	Netrikann	Best Actress	Nominated	
2022	O2	Best Actress	Nominated	

== Filmfare Awards South ==
Year	Artist/Work	Category	Language	Result	Ref.
2007	Billa	Best Actress	Tamil	Nominated	
2007	Tulasi	Best Actress	Telugu	Nominated	
2008	Yaaradi Nee Mohini	Best Actress	Tamil	Nominated	
2010	Boss Engira Bhaskaran	Best Actress	Tamil	Nominated	
2010	Simha	Best Actress	Telugu	Nominated	
2010	Super	Best Actress	Kannada	Nominated	
2011	Sri Rama Rajyam	Best Actress	Telugu	Won	
2012	Krishnam Vande Jagadgurum	Best Actress	Telugu	Nominated	
2013	Raja Rani	Best Actress	Tamil	Won	
2015	Naanum Rowdy Dhaan	Best Actress	Tamil	Won	
2016	Iru Mugan	Best Actress	Tamil	Nominated	
2016	Puthiya Niyamam	Best Actress	Malayalam	Won	
2017	Aramm	Best Actress	Tamil	Won	
2018	Kolamavu Kokila	Best Actress	Tamil	Nominated	

== International Indian Film Academy Awards ==
Year	Artist/Work	Category	Result	Ref.
2015	Maya	Best Actress	Won	
2015	Thani Oruvan	Best Actress	Nominated	
2016	Naanum Rowdy Dhaan	Best Actress	Nominated	
2024	Annapoorani: The Goddess of Food	Best Actress	Nominated	

== Kerala Film Critics Association Awards ==
Year	Artist/Work	Category	Language	Result	Ref.
2016	Puthiya Niyamam	Best Actress	Malayalam	Won	

== Nandi Awards ==
Year	Artist/Work	Category	Result	Ref.
2011	Sri Rama Rajyam	Best Actress	Won	

== Santosham Film Awards ==
Year	Artist/Work	Category	Result	Ref.
2011	Sri Rama Rajyam	Best Actress	Won	

== South Indian International Movie Awards ==
Year	Artist/Work	Category	Language	Result	Ref.
2012	Sri Rama Rajyam	Best Actress	Telugu	Won	
2013	Krishnam Vande Jagadgurum	Best Actress	Telugu	Nominated	
2013	Krishnam Vande Jagadgurum	Best Actress (Critics)	Telugu	Won	
2014	Raja Rani	Best Actress	Tamil	Nominated	
2015	Anaamika	Best Actress	Telugu	Nominated	
2016	Naanum Rowdy Dhaan	Best Actress	Tamil	Won	
2016	Bhaskar the Rascal	Best Actress	Malayalam	Won	
2017	Iru Mugan	Best Actress	Tamil	Won	
2017	Puthiya Niyamam	Best Actress	Malayalam	Won	
2018	Aramm	Best Actress	Tamil	Won	
2019	Kolamavu Kokila	Best Actress	Tamil	Nominated	
2020	Viswasam	Best Actress	Tamil	Won	
2021	Mookuthi Amman	Best Actress	Tamil	Nominated	
2022	Netrikann	Best Actress	Tamil	Nominated	
2024	Annapoorani: The Goddess of Food	Best Actress	Tamil	Won	

== Tamil Nadu State Film Awards ==
Year	Artist/Work	Category	Result	Ref.
2013	Raja Rani	Best Actress	Won	
2017	Aramm	Best Actress	Won	
2021	Pebbles	Best Film	Won	

== Vijay Awards ==
Year	Artist/Work	Category	Result	Ref.
2007	Billa	Favourite Heroine	Won	
2008	Yaaradi Nee Mohini	Favourite Heroine	Won	
2009	Aadhavan	Favourite Heroine	Nominated	
2010	Boss Engira Bhaskaran	Favourite Heroine	Nominated	
2013	Raja Rani	Favourite Heroine	Won	
2013	Raja Rani	Best Actress	Won	
2014	Idhu Kathirvelan Kadhal	Favourite Heroine	Nominated	
2017	Aramm	Favourite Heroine	Won	
2017	Aramm	Best Actress	Won	
