= O.Baby =

2023 Malayalam film by Ranjan Pramod

- Theatrical release poster
- Directed by: Ranjan Pramod
- Written by: Ranjan Pramod
- Produced by: Dileesh Pothan; Abhishek Sashidharan; Pramod Thervarpalli
- Starring: Dileesh Pothan; Raghunath Paleri
- Cinematography: Arun Chalil
- Edited by: Samjith Mohammed
- Music by: Songs: Varun Krishna; Pranav Das; Background Score: Lijin Bambino
- Production companies: Turtle Vine Productions; Colour Pencil Films; Pakal Films
- Distributed by: RootX9
- Release date: 9 June 2023
- Running time: 126 minutes
- Country: India
- Language: Malayalam

O.Baby is a 2023 Indian Malayalam-language action drama film written and directed by Ranjan Pramod. The film stars Dileesh Pothan as the title character, alongside Raghunath Paleri. It is produced by Dileesh Pothan, Abhishek Sasidharan and Pramod Thervarpalli under the banner Turtle Wine Productions in association with Color Pencil Films and Pakal Films.

The music is composed by Varun Krishna and Pranav Das, with a background score by Lijin Bambino. The cinematography and editing are handled by Arun Chalil and Samjith Mohammed.

O.Baby was theatrically released on 9 June 2023 and received positive reviews from critics.

== Premise ==
A caretaker's ancestrally formed relationship with a family is strained when the caretaker's son disrespects age-old traditions, wants to challenge generational ties, and is influenced by the awakening culture.

== Cast ==
- Dileesh Pothan as O.Baby alias Othayathu Baby, estate manager
- Raghunath Paleri as Kuttachan, planter and Jomon's father
- Haniya Nafisa as Mini, Jomon's daughter
- Devadath V. S. as Basil, Baby's son
- Saji Soman as Jomon alias Kunjumon, Mini's father
- Vishnu Agasthya as Stanley, Kuttachan's son-in-law
- Athulya Srini as Merin
- Dr. Shinu Syamalan as Suja, Baby's wife
- Gopalakrishnan as Pappy Valyappachan, head of Thiruvachola family

== Production ==
=== Development ===
Following Rakshadhikari Baiju Oppu (2017), O.Baby is the fourth directorial of Ranjan Pramod after a six-year break. In an interview with OTTPlay, Ranjan said that Dileesh called him and discussed doing a film together. After discussing and finalizing the theme, Idukki was chosen as the main location, and Ranjan began writing the script there. Along with Abhishek Sashidharan and Pramod Thervarpalli, Dileesh also joined as one of the producers of the film.

=== Casting ===
In an interview with The Hindu, Ranjan Pramod said that he chose Dileesh Pothan to play the lead role as he would be apt for the character. Haniya Naifsa, who played Nayanthara's daughter in Connect (2022), was cast in the role of Mini. The film makers chose her without an audition after seeing her photographs and videos on social media. Ranjan cast Saji Soman, son of the late M. G. Soman, as Haniya Nafisa's father. In an interview with Malayala Manorama, Devadath V. S., a Kuruppanthara native and Kalaripayattu trainee who played the character Basil, told that he was chosen by the assistant director, Krishnamani. After appearing in 1001 Nunakal (2022), Vishnu Agasthya was cast to play the role of Stanley. Dr. Shinu Syamalan, who was a part of Pathonpatham Noottandu (2022), was selected to play the role of Suja. Gopalakrishnan, a theatre actor, was cast to play a significant role.

=== Filming ===
The film was shot during the COVID-19 pandemic. The main shooting location was an estate near Anavilasam. The shoot lasted for 70 days.

== Soundtrack ==
O.Baby

Soundtrack album by Varun Krishna and Pranav Das
- Released: 2023
- Venue: Ottappalam
- Studio: Mondosonic Studios
- Genre: Feature film soundtrack
- Length: 6:10
- Language: Malayalam
- Label: Bhavana Studios
- Producers: Varun Krishna; Pranav Das

The film has songs composed by Varun Krishna and Pranav Das, while the background score is provided by Lijin Bambino. The first song titled "Mullaanu" was sung by Prarthana Indrajith and written by B. K. Harinarayanan.

Track listing
No.	Title	Lyrics	Singer(s)	Length
1.	"Mullaanu"	B. K. Harinarayanan	Prarthana Indrajith	3:50
2.	"Daasa" (Translated from The Holy Bible)	Ranjan Pramod	Jassie Gift	2:20

== Release ==
=== Theatrical ===
The film was released on 9 June 2023.

== Reception ==
=== Critical response ===
Baradwaj Rangan of Galatta Plus gave 4 out of 5 stars and wrote "We have seen Dileesh Pothan in a number of films now, but Baby is possibly his best role, and he delivers a brilliantly minimalist performance. The scene where he hugs Basil in bed broke my heart a little: the look on Dileesh's face establishes the father-son bond so beautifully.. O.Baby builds so beautifully that its message-y end doesn't feel preachy, but rightfully earned.. O.Baby comes around to the great big circle of life, in which we come with nothing and leave with nothing. All these things we fight about – like property, caste, class – are, to use a word Mini uses, "absurd".."

Anna Mathews of The Times of India gave 3 out of 5 stars and wrote "The raw feel of the film gives it an immersive feel, but what could have been a really powerful story falls short because of shortcomings in the script." Vignesh Madhu of The New Indian Express gave 3.5 out of 5 stars and wrote "Although the film doesn't boast of anything groundbreaking in terms of its writing, its such competent execution, with the right mix of thrills, that makes it an engaging watch... on the big screen." S. R. Praveen of The Hindu wrote "O.Baby explores feudal society through the minds of a few young people, who want to break free from the stifling atmosphere."

Swathi P. Ajith of Onmanorama wrote "O.Baby stands as a commendable endeavour by Ranjan Pramod to bring forth a profoundly serious theme to the public." Sanjith Sidhardhan of OTTPlay gave 3.5 out of 5 stars and wrote "Director Ranjan Pramod's O.Baby is a thoroughly engaging drama-thriller that asks pertinent questions about social oppression and also help bridge that generation gap a bit." Arjun Ramachandran of The South First gave 3 out of 5 stars and wrote "O.Baby is an intense dark thriller that discusses pertinent issues revolving around the backward class and the privileged ones."
