= Haniya Nafisa =

Indian actress and singer (born 2003)

- Born: 18 April 2003 (age 23); Kannur, Kerala, India
- Known for: Acting, music

Haniya Nafisa is an Indian independent musician, actress, playback singer and model predominantly working in Malayalam film and music industries. Born in Kannur, Kerala, she made her film debut through Connect in 2022 co-starring with Nayanthara. She has also worked in O.Baby and Applechedikal. She made her Independent music debut with Mulchedi [2024].

== Early life and career ==
Haniya Nafisa was born in Kannur in 2003. Her music entrance was influenced by the COVID pandemic and lockdown. Her breakthrough came with her viral cover of "Luka Chuppi", which she posted on social media in August 2020. This song quickly garnered attention, leading to thousands of views.

Haniya made her acting debut with the film Connect (2022), where she showcased her versatility as a performer. Following this, she appeared in AppleChedikal (2023) and O.Baby (2023), further establishing her presence in the Indian film industry.

Her debut as a playback singer was the song 'Ye Zindagi' from the movie 'Most eligible Bachelor' (2021) in the Telugu film industry, after which she debuted in the Malayalam film industry via the song 'Thone Mohangal' from the film 'Adi' (2023). She stepped into the independent music scene with the song 'Mulchedi' featuring Govind Vasantha in 2024, following which has released and been a part of multiple independent releases the same year.

== Filmography ==
Year	Title	Role	Notes	Reference
2022	Connect	Anna Joseph (Ammu)	Debut Tamil film	
2023	O.Baby	Mini	Debut Malayalam Film	
2023	Applechedikal	Jane	Premiered on 28th International Film Festival of Kerala	
