= Ashwin Saravanan =

Indian film director

- Born: Tamil Nadu, India
- Occupation: Film director
- Years active: 2015–present
- Spouse: Kaavya Ramkumar

Ashwin Saravanan is an Indian film director, who has directed predominantly Tamil language films. Directorial debut from Maya and film making style is neo-noir horror film. Second film was Game over and it is a psychological thriller film. Third movie is Connect and it is a supernatural horror movie.

== Career ==
Ashwin Saravanan began writing short stories during his years in college and eventually made some short films. Inspired by the success of young filmmakers in the early 2010s such as Karthik Subbaraj, Balaji Mohan and Nalan Kumarasamy, Ashwin chose to quit his job in the software industry to work as a film director. His first film, the horror drama Maya (2015) featured Nayanthara in the lead role, and the film won positive reviews from critics. A critic from The Times of India gave the film 3.5 stars out of 5 and wrote: "Maya is wholly original and cerebral as well. Even after the film has ended, we keep thinking about it, replaying the scenes in our mind and thinking about the inventiveness in how the plot lines are brought together. And that is its real success". Sify wrote: "Maya is a stupendous film and the entire team has done a remarkable job on par with international standards", going on to call it "undoubtedly one of the best horror movies of Tamil cinema".

Ashwin subsequently began working on Iravaakaalam, a thriller film starring S. J. Suryah and Wamiqa Gabbi, by early 2017. Despite completing production, the film remains unreleased owing to financial problems face by the producers, Thenandal Studio Limited. In 2018, Ashwin moved on to work on a bilingual psychological thriller film, Game Over (2019), shot in Tamil and Telugu. The film featured Taapsee Pannu playing a character dealing with an 'anniversary reaction', a condition which triggered unsettling feelings around the anniversary of a traumatic event. Produced by Y NOT Studios, the film performed well at the box office. Ashwin then began pre-production on a film starring Samantha Ruth Prabhu in the lead role, but the film failed to develop into production despite a year of work.

Ashwin's latest release was Connect (2022), a horror drama featuring Nayanthara, Anupam Kher and Sathyaraj in leading roles. He wrote the script for the film during the COVID-19 lockdown in India, noting that he added elements of the anxiousness that he was feeling during the period into the script. After pitching the idea to Nayanthara, the actress also agreed to produce the film.

== Personal life ==
Ashwin is married to Kaavya Ramkumar, who has worked as a co-writer in his films.

== Filmography ==
- Note: All films are in Tamil unless otherwise noted.

Year	Film	Director	Writer	Notes	Ref.
2015	Maya	Yes	Yes	Debut film	
2019	Game Over	Yes	Yes	Simultaneously shot in Telugu	
2022	Connect	Yes	Yes		
TBA	Iravaakaalam †	Yes	Yes	Delayed	

Key
†	Denotes films that have not yet been released
