= Game Over (2019 film) =

2019 Indian film by Ashwin Saravanan

- Theatrical release poster of Tamil version
- Directed by: Ashwin Saravanan
- Written by: Ashwin Saravanan; Kaavya Ramkumar
- Produced by: S. Sashikanth; Chakravarthy Ramachandra
- Starring: Taapsee Pannu; Vinodhini Vaidyanathan; Anish Kuruvilla; Sanchana Natarajan; Ramya Subramanian; Parvathi T.
- Cinematography: A. Vasanth
- Edited by: Richard Kevin
- Music by: Ron Ethan Yohann
- Production companies: YNOT Studios; Reliance Entertainment
- Distributed by: YNOTX; AP International
- Release date: June 14, 2019
- Running time: 97 minutes
- Country: India
- Languages: Tamil; Telugu
- Box office: est. ₹15.91 crore

Game Over is a 2019 Indian psychological horror film directed by Ashwin Saravanan. Produced by YNOT Studios and Reliance Entertainment, the film stars Taapsee Pannu as a woman with PTSD who is defending her home from a mysterious intruder. The film was shot simultaneously in Tamil and Telugu. The film was also dubbed in Hindi and was presented by Anurag Kashyap. The dialogues were written by Ashwin Saravanan and Kaavya Ramkumar in Tamil and Venkat Kacharla in Telugu. The music is composed by Ron Ethan Yohann.

Principal photography commenced on 10 October 2018. The film was released on 14 June 2019 to mostly positive reviews.

== Plot ==
The film starts with a serial killer (whose face is hidden) stalking and filming a girl from outside her house. Later at night, he suffocates the girl by wrapping her head in plastic and tying her hands behind her. He then drags her to an abandoned football field, where he beheads her and sets her body on fire.

Later, the film focuses on Swapna, a single young woman and a talented game designer. She has a fear of darkness and suffers post-traumatic stress, moreso known as 'anniversary reaction', a condition which triggers unsettling feelings around the anniversary of a traumatic event. For Swapna, it is the horrific memory of her being raped in a dark room on last New Year's Eve.

Swapna's family has a traditional mindset that decent girls should not have tattoos or go out at night; to which she did not listen, and was later raped. Instead of comforting Swapna afterwards, they kept blaming the tragedy on her and not listening to them. As a result, Swapna left her parents and cut off contact with them. She leads a secluded life with Kalamma, her housemaid who stays with her. Her only solace is her love for gaming.

The new year is around the corner and Swapna suffers from PTSD a second time since last year after she has to enter a dark room, even with Kalamma being with her. She also feels a stinging pain in the tattoo area on her wrist from time to time, even though the tattoo (of a game life) is a year old. Before going to a doctor, Swapna meets Varsha, the tattoo artist whom she knows well, and asks her about it. Varsha nervously reveals that she made Swapna's tattoo with an ink mixed with a stranger's ashes by mistake, and later tried and failed to contact Swapna many times to inform her about it. She profusely apologises and tries to assure Swapna that it has nothing to do with the pain she feels, but Swapna angrily storms off. Swapna books an appointment for laser removal of her tattoo that day, but she is not able to go through with the procedure as the tattoo keeps stinging.

Later, Swapna goes to a nearby cafe to grab a coffee, but finds two men watching a video of her rape. Realising that the video has gone viral and consumed by grief and despair, she rushes out and tries to hang herself back at home, but is stopped by Kalamma. Swapna is taken to a therapy session where she is informed by Kalamma that her parents are coming to talk to her about the video. Panicked, Swapna immediately goes to the balcony and jumps off. She is saved, although her legs are broken, and she is now recovering on a wheelchair.

Weeks later, on New Year's Eve, a woman named Dr. Reena arrives with Varsha at Swapna's home. She tells Swapna about her daughter Amutha, a three-time cancer survivor and social activist for cancer patients who became an unfortunate victim of a serial killer. In Amutha's memory, Reena got the tattoo that Amutha wanted her mother to have, with the ink mixed with her ashes, which was also accidentally used by Varsha to make Swapna's tattoo. Reena comforts and encourages Swapna, saying that she feels her daughter is with her in the form of her tattoo, and will want Swapna to fight no matter what the outcome is.

Afterwards, Swapna cancels her second tattoo removal appointment. Beginning to accept her past and feeling optimistic, she decides to meet her parents the next day (which she had been deliberately putting off for the past few months), much to Kalamma's pleasant surprise.

Meanwhile, the same serial killer finally targets Swapna. At night, he kills the security guard and then Kalamma. Before he kills Swapna, she is shocked to see not one but three of the same tattoos on her wrist.

Swapna wakes up from the nightmare, only to find that there are two tattoos left on her wrist. Wanting to make sure it was all just a dream, she looks out the window with Kalamma to spot the security guard, but they are horrified to see his headless body on the ground. Fearing the same events about to happen, Swapna calls the police ahead of time and waits for them with Kalamma inside her room, but they are forced to leave when someone sets the room on fire from outside her window. In the living room, they see the serial killer waiting for them. He murders Kalamma, but two police officers who had just arrived are able to spot the killer from outside the window and shoot him.

Outside the house, Swapna sees the curtain being closed by the killer inside. Assuming him to be still alive, Swapna alerts the officers. When one of them searches inside, he finds the body of the killer gone. He immediately orders his subordinate to take Swapna to the police station while he stays behind and calls for backup. As the vehicle is driving off, Swapna is shocked to see in the rear view mirror not one but three killers with the head of the officer, waving her goodbye with the hand of the previously dead killer sitting on her wheelchair. She looks behind and, to her horror, sees the vehicle on fire. She cries to the officer to stop the car, which when he does, instantly makes the vehicle explode.

Remembering her trauma and Reena's words, Swapna awakes again from the nightmare with her last life remaining, only one tattoo. She struggles for a bit but doesn't switch the light on this time, overcoming her fear of darkness in the process and not bringing her awareness to the killers's attention, who had just beheaded the security guard. The three men take their positions at their own pace, one outside the front door, one outside Swapna's room window and one going to the terrace. During this extra time, Swapna, this time more calm, calls the police and then plans with Kalamma on how to counter the situation. She switches off the light of the whole house, which stops the killer outside her front door from recording anything inside, confusing him. She and Kalamma then manage to burn the other killer outside her room window to death, just as the police arrive. However, the killer on the terrace pushes Kalamma down the stairs, severely injuring her, while the two officers are killed by the killer outside the front door. Now in the living room, he targets Swapna, who had come to Kalamma's aid. Kalamma manages to distract the killer by stabbing him in the foot with a knife and give Swapna the hint, who takes out the footrest of her wheelchair and hits him on the head multiple times, killing him too. The third killer on the terrace now comes down and Swapna quickly drags herself to her room but the killer enters after her and shuts the door behind. He records Swapna with the video camera while holding a machete to her neck, but she is able to stab him in his neck with a broken piece of glass. With all the killers now dead and Kalamma still alive, Swapna is overwhelmed with emotions just as the fireworks are set off in the sky for a new year.

== Cast ==
- Taapsee Pannu as Swapna
- Vinodhini Vaidyanathan as Kalamma
- Anish Kuruvilla as Psychiatrist
- Sanchana Natarajan as Amutha (in Tamil) / Amritha (in Telugu)
- Ramya Subramanian as Varsha
- Parvathi T. as Dr. Reena
- David Solomon Raja as Inspector
- Indrajith as Constable
- Subramanian as Anwar

== Production ==
The film marks the return of actress Taapsee Pannu to Tamil cinema after a hiatus of four years. The first look poster of the film was unveiled on 10 October 2018, which displayed Taapsee sitting in a wheelchair with legs in plaster casts. The shooting of the film commenced on the very next day on 11 October 2018. Pannu went under intense training playing a person who uses a wheelchair. The shooting of the film was wrapped up on 14 December 2018.

== Soundtrack ==
Game Over

Soundtrack album by Ron Ethan Yohann
- Released: 24 August 2019
- Recorded: 2018–2019
- Genre: Feature film soundtrack
- Length: 1:07:26
- Label: YNOT Music
- Producer: Ron Ethan Yohann

Ron Ethan Yohann chronology
Sigai (2019)	Game Over (2019)	Navarasa (2021)

The official film score is composed by Ron Ethan Yohann who had worked with Ashwin Saravanan in Maya and Iravaakaalam. The music rights were secured by the production company's subsidiary music label YNOT Music, with Divo as their digital partner. The official soundtrack album was released by Santhosh Narayanan on 24 August 2019. The album features 28 songs which lasts for 67 minutes.

No.	Title	Length
1.	"Game Over- Main Titles"	2:41
2.	"One Fine Morning"	2:05
3.	"Pac Man"	1:11
4.	"Panic Attack"	2:07
5.	"VR"	3:06
6.	"Anniversary Reaction"	2:32
7.	"The Dream"	2:45
8.	"Immortal Inks"	1:20
9.	"The Scar"	4:01
10.	"The Tattoo"	1:01
11.	"Shame"	4:40
12.	"The Fall"	0:53
13.	"Recuperation"	1:58
14.	"Mother"	1:17
15.	"Amudha"	5:53
16.	"Hope"	1:47
17.	"Intruder Alert"	0:44
18.	"The Swing"	4:06
19.	"The Masked Man"	2:24
20.	"Deja Vu"	1:49
21.	"Help"	2:10
22.	"Rescue"	1:22
23.	"The Reveal"	1:53
24.	"Game On"	3:30
25.	"Fight Like a Girl"	2:29
26.	"Retaliation"	2:20
27.	"The Last Stand"	0:50
28.	"Happy New Year - End Credits"	4:32
Total length:		1:07:26

== Marketing and release ==
The official teaser of the movie was released on 15 May 2019. The trailer of the film was released by Dhanush, Rana Daggubati and Taapsee Pannu in Tamil, Telugu and Hindi on 30 May 2019. The film was released in all three versions on 14 June 2019.

== Home media ==
The Tamil, Telugu and Hindi versions of the film became available as VOD on Netflix in late 2019.

== Reception ==
=== Critical response ===
On the review aggregator website Rotten Tomatoes, 67% of 15 critics' reviews are positive, with an average rating of 6.7/10.

Nandini Ramnath of Scroll.in praises Pannu and Vaidyanathan for their 'doughty performance' and opines that the writers have delivered a taut and highly watchable thriller. Summing up she says, "[The film] is a taut thriller about demons within and without". Anna M. M. Vetticad of Firstpost gave three and half stars out of five and feels that the film is an inventive, intelligent and terrifying film that doesn't take the viewer lightly. Praising the performance of Taapsee Pannu and direction of Ashwin Saravanan, Anna says, "Game Over is as crisp and to-the-point as a thriller can get." Priyanka Sinha Jha of News18 rates it with three and half stars out of five, stating the film with its paranormal-meets-noir is a good example where Indian concepts are combined with western. She concludes, that the Hindi version of the film is worth a watch for entertainment and its new-age cinematic virtues. Writing for NDTV Saibal Chatterjee terming screenplay "smart and minimalist", praises the director for his deft handling of the execution and Pannu for her characterisation of the role. He concludes the review as, "While she [Pannu] may be the primary reason why you must go out and watch this film, it certainly isn't devoid of other intrinsic merits in terms of substance and execution." He rates it with three stars out of five. Raja Sen writing a mixed review for Hindustan Times rated the film with two and half stars out of five and finds, 'Pannu strong in a hysterically distraught role' and Vinodhini Vaidyanathan 'wonderfully warm'. He thinks that the film, inspired from Black Mirror has a solid concept. But, he says, "[it] devolves into a witless muddle in the final act." Baradwaj Rangan of Film Companion South wrote "In short, Game Over is a tight genre-hopping thriller that keeps you guessing about the genre it can be slotted into...The small miracle of the film is that it manages to pack all of this—and a lot more—into 100-something minutes".

Negative reviews such as those by Rajeev Masand writing for News18, praise Pannu for her performance but states that, "barring its leading lady's impressive performance, it's simply hit and miss." He rates the film with two and half stars out of five. Shubhra Gupta writing for The Indian Express gives one and half star out of five and finds "writing flabby" and "key sequences repetitive". She says, "There are a couple of genuinely scary moments, but the rest of it is too stretched: even the 102 minute run time feels too long, with not enough thrills or chills."

=== Box office ===
Game Over's worldwide theatrical gross was ₹15.91 crore (US$1.7 million).

=== Awards and nominations ===
Date of ceremony	Award	Category	Recipient(s) and nominee(s)	Result	Ref.
11 January 2020	Ananda Vikatan Cinema Awards	Best Actress	Taapsee Pannu	Won	
11 January 2020	Ananda Vikatan Cinema Awards	Best Supporting Actress	Vinodhini Vaidyanathan	Nominated	
11 January 2020	Ananda Vikatan Cinema Awards	Best Story	Ashwin Saravanan and Kaavya Ramkumar	Nominated	
11 January 2020	Ananda Vikatan Cinema Awards	Best Screenplay	Ashwin Saravanan and Kaavya Ramkumar	Nominated	
11 January 2020	Ananda Vikatan Cinema Awards	Best Art Direction	Sivasankar	Nominated	
11 January 2020	Ananda Vikatan Cinema Awards	Best Editing	Kevin Richard	Won	
28 March 2020	Critics Choice Film Awards	Best Film	Kalaipuli S. Thanu	Nominated	
28 March 2020	Critics Choice Film Awards	Best Actress	Taapsee Pannu	Nominated	
28 March 2020	Critics Choice Film Awards	Best Writing	Ashwin Saravanan and Kaavya Ramkumar	Nominated	
18 September 2021	9th South Indian International Movie Awards	Best Supporting Actress	Vinodhini	Nominated	

== See also ==
- List of films featuring time loops
