= Thalaimagan =

- Poster
- Directed by: R. Sarathkumar
- Screenplay by: Cheran
- Dialogue by: Rajkannan
- Story by: Kaveri Vendhan
- Produced by: Radhika Sarathkumar
- Starring: R. Sarathkumar; Nayanthara
- Cinematography: Krish Kymal
- Edited by: V. T. Vijayan
- Music by: Srikanth Deva; Paul J.
- Production company: Radaan Mediaworks
- Release date: 21 October 2006
- Running time: 153 minutes
- Country: India
- Language: Tamil

Thalaimagan (transl. Eldest Son) is a 2006 Indian Tamil-language action film directed by R. Sarathkumar, starring himself alongside Nayanthara, Vadivelu and Vijayakumar. The film marked Sarathkumar's directorial debut and is his 100th film as an actor. It was released on 21 October 2006.

== Plot ==
The story is set around the bulwark of honest and public good institution of everest. A journalistic anachronism at a time when media houses have become mouthpieces for corporate houses. It is helmed by the fearless Ayya. It has among its ranks an intrepid scribe Dheeran. He is no journeyman journalist. He is writer as well as a doer. When the power of the pen looks like slackening, he uses the hands that push the pen, so to say. And then there is harried colleague Erimalai, who is often just a step away from trouble. Meghala is an enterprising intern who drives Dheeran to distraction.

Dheeran runs into the evil axis of politico and police web as represented by the corrupt Minister Shanmuga Vadivelu and a venal cop Alankaram. Dheeran, through his mixed ways, frustrates all the duo's evil plans. But a new water bottling plant of an MNC becomes a major confrontation issue. Dheeran goes hammer and tongs against the project, as it would be harmful to villagers. Dheeran painstakingly exposes all the chinks in the project. Shanmugasundaram has to come with a violent reprisal and he sure does and thinks he has done away with Dheeran.

Did he? But Dheeran comes back from dead as a new man with renewed force. In the two years, Shanmugha Sundaram and Alankaram had come a long way. But Dheeran, slowly but stealthily, exposes them with a cunning of a mountain fox. He exposes all their bad deeds with clinching evidence. How? Well, it all leads to an action-packed climax.

== Cast ==
- R. Sarathkumar as Dheeran
- Nayanthara as Meghala
- Vadivelu as Erimalai/Panimalai
- Vijayakumar as L. Sathya Moorthy
- Seema Biswas as S. Alankaram
- Mukesh Tiwari as Shanmuga Vadivelu
- Sangili Murugan
- Nizhalgal Ravi as Meghala's father
- Delhi Ganesh
- Bala Singh
- Alex
- Thennavan
- Besant Ravi as Henchman
- John Vijay
- Thambi Ramaiah as Inspector Veeraraj
- Lavanya as Abhirami
- Khushbu in a cameo appearance
- K. S. Ravikumar in a cameo appearance
- Mumaith Khan as an item number in "Velli Kinnathil"

Uncredited

- Rajendran as Fighter
- Krishnamoorthy
- Haja Sheriff
- Birla Bose as police officer
- Ramjee

== Production ==
In 2005, R. Sarathkumar announced his 100th film as an actor, titled Thalaimagan. The film was launched on 15 September 2005 at Le Royal Meridien, Chennai. The originally announced director Balaji left the film after the shoot became delayed. Sarathkumar replaced Balaji as director, thus making his directorial debut. Krish Kymal who earlier worked in advertisement films made his debut as cinematographer with this film. The climax was shot at a sugar mill in Porur, during the first schedule which was "the most difficult part to shoot" as it involved "close to 850 artistes" and was completed within eight days. Separately, Seema Biswas sustained a broken arm during a filming accident but managed to complete her scenes on schedule. The filming was also held at Kochi, Chikmagalur, Madurai and Dindigul.

== Soundtrack ==
Two songs were composed by Srikanth Deva, and four by Paul J.

Song	Singers	Composer	Lyrics
"Penakaaran"	Kailash Kher, Yogeswaran Manikkam, Veeramani	Paul J.	Vairamuthu
"Deen Thena"	S. P. Balasubrahmanyam, Chinmayi	Paul J.	Vairamuthu
"Uppumoottai"	Grace Karunas, Karunas	Paul J.	Vaali
"Velli Kinnathil"	Sangeetha Sajith, Andrea Jeremiah	Paul J.	Vairamuthu
"Nooru Nooru" I	R. Sarathkumar, Priyadarshini	Srikanth Deva	Mounan
"Nooru Nooru" II	Tippu, Priyadarshini	Srikanth Deva	Mounan

== Release and reception ==
Thalaimagan was released on 21 October 2006, during Diwali. Venkatachari Jagannathan of Rediff.com rated the film two stars out of five, saying, "On the whole, Thalaimagan is like reading a morning paper in the evening". Sify wrote, "Thalaimagan is an utterly hackneyed archaic formula film. It is one man taking on a corrupt system controlled by a powerful politician and his associate, a she-devil of a cop!". Lajjavathi of Kalki wrote director Sarathkumar cannot do enough to satisfy actor Sarathkumar fans and concluded wishing him better luck next time. Cinesouth wrote, "The basic story line is strong but the plan of the screenplay is haphazard. The pervading boredom of many scenes makes one wonder if Cheran is indeed the writer of this screenplay".
