= Nayanthara: Beyond the Fairytale =

2024 Indian Netflix documentary film

- Official release poster
- Directed by: Amith Krishnan
- Produced by: Gubendiran. V.K; Tarc Studio LLP
- Starring: Nayanthara
- Edited by: Amith Krishnan; Pradeep E. Ragav
- Music by: Prashanth Techno
- Production company: Tarc Studio LLP
- Distributed by: Netflix
- Release date: 18 November 2024
- Running time: 82 minutes
- Country: India
- Language: English

Nayanthara: Beyond the Fairytale is a 2024 Indian English-language documentary film with portions in Tamil and Malayalam, that explores the early life and career of actress Nayanthara, highlighting her personal and professional journey to becoming a well known actress in Indian cinema. The film was directed by Amith Krishnan and produced and distributed by Netflix.

Nayanthara: Beyond the Fairytale was released on November 18, 2024, to coincide with Nayanthara's 40th birthday. Upon release, it received mixed-to-negative reviews from critics.

== Plot ==
The documentary chronicles the life and career of actress Nayanthara from her own perspective, beginning with her family background and early years in her birthplace, Thiruvalla. It follows her entry into the Indian film industry, her rise to stardom, and the professional setbacks she encountered along the way. The narrative also explores her personal life, including her relationship with filmmaker Vignesh Shivan, their marriage, and her experience with motherhood. The film incorporates archival material such as film clips, childhood photographs, and social media videos to provide a visual account of her journey.

== Cast ==
- Nayanthara
- Vignesh Shivan
- Omana Kurian, Nayanthara's mother
- Kurian Kodiyattu, Nayanthara's father
- Lenu Kurian, Nayanthara's brother
- Meena Kumari, Vignesh Shivan's mother
- Uyir Vignesh Shivan
- Ulag Vignesh Shivan
- Radhika Sarathkumar
- Taapsee Pannu
- Rana Daggubati
- Nagarjuna Akkineni
- Tamannaah Bhatia
- Vijay Sethupathi
- Parvathy Thiruvothu
- Dileep
- Rajinikanth
- Shah Rukh Khan
- Suriya
- Jyothika
- A. R. Rahman
- Saranya Ponvannan
- Karthi
- R. Sarathkumar
- Anirudh Ravichander
- Boney Kapoor
- Vikram Prabhu
- Mani Ratnam
- S. J. Suryah
- Suhasini Maniratnam
- Dhivyadharshini
- Jayam Ravi
- Atlee
- Preetha Vijayakumar
- Shalini
- Shamlee
- A. R. Ameen

== Marketing ==
On 9 November 2024, Netflix India released the official trailer for Nayanthara: Beyond the Fairytale on YouTube. The trailer included a montage of Nayanthara's on-screen appearances and select personal moments. The documentary prominently features footage from the wedding of Nayanthara and Vignesh Shivan, which was attended by several notable film industry figures, including Rajinikanth, Shah Rukh Khan, and Mani Ratnam.

== Legal issues ==
On 16 November 2024, Nayanthara released an open letter and a cryptic Instagram post addressing actor-producer Dhanush. In the letter, she alleged that Dhanush had withheld a No Objection Certificate (NOC) for nearly two years, preventing her from using behind-the-scenes footage from the 2015 film Naanum Rowdy Dhaan, which he produced under his banner, Wunderbar Films. She further claimed that the delay stemmed from personal grievances related to her romantic relationship with director Vignesh Shivan, which began during the making of the film.

According to Nayanthara, Dhanush issued a legal notice demanding ₹10 crore in compensation for the inclusion of a three-second clip from the Naanum Rowdy Dhaan set in her Netflix documentary Nayanthara: Beyond the Fairytale. In response, the filmmakers re-edited the documentary to remove the disputed footage, as well as any associated songs or visual content from the film due to the lack of permission. A legal hearing was held on 22 January 2025, and the case was closed in March 2025 with a ruling in Nayanthara's favor.

== Reception ==
Nayanthara: Beyond the Fairytale received mixed reviews from critics and audiences. While some praised the documentary's polished production and intimate tone, others criticized it for lacking depth and avoiding difficult aspects of the actress's life and career.

On NDTV, the film was rated 3 out of 5 stars. The review noted that although the documentary is not an objective account, it is "entertaining and insightful" in depicting Nayanthara's personal and professional rise. The Hindu called it a "dignified step" that shows Nayanthara reflecting on her life and marriage to Vignesh Shivan while asking, “What is wrong about a woman searching for true love if that love is her meaning to all?”

Abhinav Subramanian of The Times of India awarded the film 2.5 out of 5 stars, writing that it is "pleasant" but "too controlled to be a true peek into her life" and lacks new insights.

Hindustan Times described the documentary as a “carefully crafted happily ever after” that traces her rise to stardom but offers limited exploration of her personal or professional struggles. Rediff.com similarly criticized the film, stating that it "barely scratches the surface" and fails to offer a candid look at Nayanthara's journey.

The Free Press Journal wrote that the film “shies away from controversies” and “paints a Disney-esque picture,” avoiding critical reflection or exploration of challenging moments in her career. News18 called the documentary a "lazy retelling" of what could have been a complex and audacious journey, and noted that it missed the opportunity to present an honest and nuanced narrative.
