= Connect (2022 film) =

2022 Indian Tamil film

- Theatrical release poster
- Directed by: Ashwin Saravanan
- Written by: Ashwin Saravanan; Kaavya Ramkumar
- Produced by: Vignesh Shivan
- Starring: Nayanthara; Sathyaraj; Anupam Kher; Vinay Rai
- Cinematography: Manikantan Krishnamachary
- Edited by: Richard Kevin
- Music by: Prithvi Chandrasekhar
- Production company: Rowdy Pictures
- Release date: 22 December 2022
- Running time: 99 minutes
- Country: India
- Language: Tamil
- Box office: ₹20 crore

Connect is a 2022 Tamil-language supernatural horror film directed by Ashwin Saravanan and produced by Vignesh Shivan under Rowdy Pictures, starring Nayanthara, Sathyaraj, Anupam Kher, and Vinay Rai. Connect marks the second collaboration of Saravanan with Nayanthara, after Maya. The background score was composed by Prithvi Chandrasekhar. The film also marks Kher's return to Tamil cinema after a long gap.

Upon release, it received generally mixed reviews from critics and audience, alike.

== Plot ==
Dr. Joseph Benoy (Vinay Rai) lives with his wife Susan (Nayanthara), and teenage daughter Anna Joseph (Haniya Nafisa), an aspiring musician who has secured admission to Trinity College, London.

During the nationwide lockdown in India, Dr. Benoy tests positive for COVID-19, is hospitalised and dies soon after. Anna, who cannot get over her father's death, gets in touch with a Ouija board practitioner (Mekha Rajan) via a video call to help her contact her father's spirit. Unfortunately, the practitioner who seems to initially help Anna apparently worships the devil Satan and performs a black magic ritual.

A few days later, Susan reveals to her father, Arthur Samuel (Sathyaraj), that she and her daughter have tested positive for COVID-19. Also, Anna has become moody and withdrawn and confines herself to her room. Anna's reclusive behaviour worries Susan who arranges for a therapist to talk to her in an online session. Anna starts talking with the therapist in Malayalam and taunts her about her husband's extramarital affairs.

As days pass, Susan notices suspicious activity in her house and sees drawings of inverted crosses in Anna's room. On Arthur's insistence, Susan lets Father Alex (Avinash) come to their house and perform a prayer. Later, Susan is injured by an evil spirit. Through a Zoom video call with Father Augustine (Anupam Kher), Arthur and Susan learn that Anna is possessed by a demon who intends to destroy her. He tells her that certain behaviour such as speaking in different languages, having superhuman strength and knowing too much about people's personal lives are all symptoms of demonic possession. Also, he tells Susan about Anna's attempts to contact her father through a Séance ritual. He reveals that the Ouija Board practitioner is a Devil worshipper who summons evil spirits. She had trapped Anna by letting a demon possess her in exchange for wealth. Though reluctant at first, Father Alex finally suggests that an online exorcism might be the only way to save Anna and makes the necessary arrangements.

He starts the exorcism with Arthur and Susan in Zoom and warns them not to get distracted by anything. When Susan pours holy water on Anna, the demon reveals that its name is Curson. It emotionally blackmails Susan by talking in Anna's voice. Ultimately, they exorcise Anna and finally succeed when a statue of Jesus Christ moves itself and emits bright light, and everything returns to normal. Father Augustine gifts a potted plant to Susan and asks her to plant it in memory of her loved ones.

== Cast ==
- Nayanthara as Susan
- Sathyaraj as Arthur Samuel, Susan's father
- Anupam Kher as Father Augustine
- Vinay Rai as Dr.Joseph Benoy, Susan's late husband, (Cameo appearance)
- Haniya Nafisa as Anna Joseph (Ammu), Susan and Joseph's daughter
- Avinash as Father Alex
- Maala Parvathi as Healthcare Worker
- Mekha Rajan as Ouija Board Practitioner
- Lizzie Antony as Lizzy
- Ankit as Lizzy's son
- Praveena Nandu as Therapist

== Production ==
In a conversation with Silverscreen India, Ashwin Saravanan stated that: "I was feeling stressed and anxious; the times were very uncertain. There was hopelessness and uncertainty about whether we would ever recover from it. I wanted to portray those emotions in a film and I realised the only genre that would work for my purpose was horror. Anxiety, dread, sense of hopelessness and fear – the horror genre lends itself to these emotions beautifully. We chose the title Connect because, during the lockdown, all of us found it hard to connect with those around us. I want to capture that in the film. What happens when we are unable to connect, is one of layers that we have explored." The story is written by Ashwin in association with his wife Kaavya Ramkumar, marking their second collaboration after Game Over. Filming began in October 2021 and schedules were canned continuously in Chennai, Tamil Nadu. The makers unveiled the first look poster of the film on Nayanthara's birthday, 18 November 2021. Filming was completed by late 2022.

== Release ==
The makers announced the release date of the film as 22 December 2022 with a jump-scary teaser and also the film will not have an intermission. However, after theatre owners in Tamil Nadu refused to screen films without intermissions, fearing potential revenue losses, the makers of Connect agreed to give theatres an option to induce intermissions. Ahimsa Entertainment released the film in the UK and Europe.

== Critical reception ==
On the review aggregator website Rotten Tomatoes, 43% of 7 critics' reviews are positive, with an average rating of 5/10.

Logesh Balachandran of The Times of India gave the film 2.5 out of 5 stars and wrote "Nayanthara, once again, delivers a convincing act as the mother of a depressed teenager. The technical aspects of the film are brilliant, especially the sound design (Sachin Sudhakaran and Hariharan) and cinematography." Latha Srinivasan of India Today gave the film 3 out of 5 stars and wrote "Produced by Rowdy Pictures, Connect is a film that belongs to Haniya Nafisa and the audience will remember her for a long time to come." Haricharan Pudipeddi of Hindustan Times wrote "The music and cinematography play a very key role in making Connect an exceptionally good cinematic experience." Srivatsan S of The Hindu wrote "For someone whose resume includes the stunning Game Over, you would ideally expect Ashwin to push the genre constraints. Connect is him settling for the ordinary."

Thinkal Menon of OTTPlay gave the film's rating 3 out of 5 stars and wrote "The performances of lead actors save this run-of-the-mill horror film which has nothing new to offer in terms of story." Kirubhakar Purushothaman of The Indian Express gave the film 3 out of 5 stars and wrote "Again, it is pretty amusing that of all kinds of Tamil mainstream cinema, a true-blue genre has represented the ones that are still grieving." Vishal Menon of Film Companion wrote "It's a familiar story told in an unfamiliar way and when the making-style contributes, you feel fear like vou haven't yet before. But when it doesn't, it's the boredom of ghosts past that get to you first." Lakshmi Subramanian of The Week gave the film's rating 3 out of 5 and wrote "With the film revolving around the three characters, in the backdrop of the lockdown, 99 minutes might seem long." Avinash Ramachandran of Cinema Express gave the film 2.5 out of 5 stars and wrote, "Connect starts strongly with a bright tale freefalling into the depths of darkness, courtesy of the pandemic, the film sparingly hits the high notes of the genre while just about managing past the finish line."
