= Puthiya Niyamam =

2016 film by A. K. Sajan

- Film poster
- Directed by: A. K. Sajan
- Written by: A. K. Sajan
- Produced by: Geo Abraham; P. Venugopal
- Starring: Mammootty; Nayanthara
- Cinematography: Roby Varghese Raj
- Edited by: Vivek Harshan
- Music by: Score: Gopi Sundar; Songs: Vinu Thomas
- Production companies: Abaam Movies; VG Films International
- Distributed by: Alabama Movies
- Release date: 12 February 2016
- Running time: 132 minutes
- Country: India
- Language: Malayalam
- Box office: est. ₹14 crore

Puthiya Niyamam (transl. New Law) is a 2016 Indian Malayalam-language action thriller film written and directed by A. K. Sajan. The film stars Mammootty and Nayanthara in the lead roles along with Baby Ananya, Sheelu Abraham, Rachana Narayanankutty, S. N. Swamy, Roshan Mathew, Anil K. Reji, Sendrayan, and Aju Varghese in supporting roles. It was released on 12 February 2016.

The film explores the drug-fueled crimes and consumption of substances, like marijuana and LSD, by the youth. It was dubbed into Tamil and Telugu under the title Vasuki. The film was remade in Kannada as Purushothama (2022).

== Plot ==
Louis Pothen is a Christian popular part-time TV film critic, an artist, and a divorce lawyer who also participates in a live TV channel named "Kathrika". His wife Vasuki Iyer is a Hindu Kathakali artist, and they live with their school-going daughter, Chintha. They live away from their parents as their marriage was inter-religious.

One day, when Louis and Chintha go to Louis' mother's house, Vasuki goes to the building terrace to get some items for her Kathakali performance. There, she gets angry when her neighbour Aryan makes some irritable compliments about her. She tries to get out, but his friend Sudeep closes the terrace door. Both of them grab her, and she fights back. She runs to the door again and tries to open it, but Pachabasmam, a man who irons clothes at the apartment, refuses to open the door, betraying her. Aryan and Sudeep physically harass and rape Vasuki. Vasuki goes into shock after the rape. She does not confide in anyone and becomes withdrawn. Her demeanor changes as she becomes irritable and falls short in her household work. She even contemplates suicide, but a better sense prevails when she realizes that it is her rapists who should die and not her.

After a Kathakali performance, Vasuki is complimented by Jeena Bhai, the new police commissioner. She finds Jeena's phone number from Louis's mobile, calls her, and narrates her ordeal. Jeena encourages Vasuki to tell her what happened, but she strays away from the topic and focuses on men who sell fish near the building, Sura and Shibu, who make irritable compliments about housewives who buy from them. Both of them are later arrested.

Jeena tries to get more information about her, and Vasuki tells her what happened. Jeena insists on letting the police arrest them, but Vasuki says she wants to take revenge and does not want to let the law handle them. Jeena helps her kill all of them, starting with Pacha. Jeena tells her to put pepper in the ironer with which he irons clothes and in his asthma inhaler. Vasuki sits on the balcony of her apartment and watches Pacha die. Pacha's death makes Sudeep a little worried, but Aryan dismisses it, telling him he might have just smoked too hard.

To kill the rest of the culprits responsible, Jeena asks her if she knows about "takotsubo" (driving the culprits to suicide), mentioning it as the method she will be using to kill the rest. Vasuki gets a parcel containing a phone and a SIM card with which she is supposed to talk to them as Jeena. Vasuki gets photos of Kani Mohan, Sudeep's sister, and leaked videos from the pen camera, which Aryan and Sudeep forgot about when they left the terrace after they raped her. Vasuki, as Jeena, calls Sudeep and warns him. Then, she leaks the videos online. Jeena calls Kani and lets her know that her brother is the culprit, making Kani resent Sudeep and leading him to commit suicide. Aryan hears about this and is called by Vasuki, warning him as Jeena. He goes into hiding in an abandoned building and gets a call from Vasuki saying that he has been caught and an arrest will be made. She tells Aryan that death is his only escape now, and he commits suicide.

It is later revealed that Louis was informed by Swami, a resident of a neighboring apartment, of his wife being raped. Swami had witnessed Vasuki being raped from his house but was old and too far away to help. He informs Louis about what he saw. Louis then reveals to Swami that through mobile software (which can transform a male voice into a female voice), he mimics Jeena's voice and guides Vasuki to murder her rapists. He realizes that this is the only way that she will get absolution. Louis never reveals the truth to Vasuki and decides to keep it a secret so that they can lead a happy married life.

== Cast ==
- Mammootty as Adv. Louis Pothen
- Nayanthara as Vasuki Iyer Louis, Adv. Louis Pothen's wife
- Baby Ananya as Chintha, Vasuki and Louis's daughter
- Sheelu Abraham as DCP Jeena Bhai IPS
- Rachana Narayanankutty as Kani Mohan, Sudeep's sister
- S. N. Swamy as Swami
- Roshan Mathew as Aryan
- Anil K. Reji as Sudeep Mohan, Kani's brother
- Sendrayan as Panchabhasmam (Pacha)
- Aju Varghese as Romanch
- Sreelatha Namboothiri as Pavel Ammachi
- Sadiq as Dayanandan Mash, Aryan's father
- Ponnamma Babu as Anuradha
- Ravi Mariya as Easwaran
- Sohan Seenulal as Asst. Adv. Baburaj
- Jennifer Antony as Kshemettathi, Aryan's mother
- Pradeep Kottayam as Kalathil Sreenivasan
- Abhiram Radhakrishnan as Abishek
- Aniyappan as Sura

== Production ==
=== Development ===
In July 2015, it was reported that Mammootty and Nayanthara would play an inter-caste couple in A. K. Sajan's forthcoming film. The film was reported to be initially planned with Suresh Gopi in the lead. It was also reported that Sajan initially wrote the script with Renji Panicker in mind for the lead role, with Muthumani as the heroine. But after hearing the script, Renji noted that the script demands a "larger scale" production and suggested Mammootty for the lead role. As per Ranji's suggestion, when Sajan approached Mammootty, the offer was immediately accepted by him. Regarding the characters, A. K. Sajan says, "Mammootty's character in the film, Louis Pothen, almost mirrors his real-life personality. He's an easy-going lawyer, who is also a film critic and has a socialist leaning. However, Nayanthara's character, Vasuki, is diametrically opposite."

=== Filming and post-production ===
Principal photography commenced on 21 August. The film was initially titled Solomonte Koodaram, but later changed to Puthiya Niyamam. The title was revealed through its first look poster on 27 October 2015. The filming was completed by October 2015 in Ernakulam and Thrissur.

The costumes that Mammootty's character, Louis Pothen, has to don in the film were purchased from Dubai by Mammootty himself. Roby Varghese Raj who was an assistant of cinematographers Rajeev Menon and Jomon T. John debuted as an independent cinematographer in the film.

The editing was done at the residence of Vivek Harshan in Chennai. Harshan, the National Award-winning film editor, was in commitment for six films simultaneously and edited Puthiya Niyamam at the insistence of director Sajan. The post-production works, including Mammootty's dubbing, were completed in December. However, Nayanthara was unimpressed with the dubbing of her character and expressed her desire to dub for herself. As it would be her debut dubbing in the Malayalam language, a dubbing trial was conducted in Chennai in mid-January 2016.

=== Music ===
The film consists of two songs composed by Gopi Sunder and Vinu Thomas but shows only one in the film.

== Box office ==
Puthiya Niyamam has reportedly collected ₹8.12 crore (US$850,000) and completed more than 7,000 shows at the Kerala box office. The film grossed ₹14.33 lakh (US$15,000) after two weekends at US box office.

== Critical reception ==
Sanjith Sidhardhan of The Times of India rated the film 3 out of 5 concluding, "Puthiya Niyamam is an intense tale elevated by the screen presence of its protagonists. It has a fresh take on certain aspects and is worth a one-time watch." Rating 3.5 out of 5, Akhila Menon of Filmibeat called the film "a perfect thriller" and appreciated Mammootty and Nayanthara for their performance and "exceptional" screen chemistry, A. K Sajan for his direction and "brilliantly written" script and Gopi Sundar for his "extraordinary" background score. The critic said, "The movie is engaging from the beginning till the end, even though most of the scenes are restricted to the lead characters." Anu James of International Business Times also gave a rating of 3.5 in a scale of 5, saying "With thrilling moments accompanied by right amount of comedy, AK Sajan's scripting in "Puthiya Niyamam" makes the movie interesting and thought provoking," and noted Nayanthara's performance as her "career-best".

== Awards ==
- Nayantara won Filmfare Award for Best Actress - Malayalam for her performance in the movie.
