= Netrikann =

2021 Indian crime thriller film

- Official release poster
- Directed by: Milind Rau
- Written by: Milind Rau; Navin Sundaramurthy
- Based on: Blind
- Produced by: Vignesh Shivan
- Starring: Nayanthara; Ajmal Ameer; K. Manikandan; Saran Shakthi
- Cinematography: R. D. Rajasekhar
- Music by: Girishh Gopalakrishnan
- Production companies: Rowdy Pictures; Kross Pictures
- Distributed by: Disney+ Hotstar
- Release date: 13 August 2021
- Running time: 146 minutes
- Country: India
- Language: Tamil

Netrikann (transl. The Third Eye) is a 2021 Indian Tamil-language crime thriller film directed and co-written by Milind Rau. The film stars Nayanthara with Ajmal Ameer, K. Manikandan, and Saran Shakthi in supporting roles. A remake of the 2011 South Korean film Blind, it centres around a blind police officer in search of a serial killer. The film is produced by Vignesh Shivan and Hyunwoo Thomas Kim under Rowdy Pictures, and Kross Pictures, a multinational film and television production company. Netrikann was released on 13 August 2021 on the streaming service Disney+ Hotstar.

== Plot ==
Two cases, one involving a missing person and the victim of a hit-and-run, appear related. The police search for witnesses.

Durga used to be a promising cadet at the CBI, but after a horrific car accident that killed her foster brother, Adithya, and caused her to lose her eyesight, her police career ended. She reveals to SI Manikandan at the police station that on the night of the hit-and-run case, she was picked up by a cab driver. Durga believes the taxi driver may be the perpetrator of the crimes. Initially, Manikandan doesn't take her claims seriously because she is blind, but when Durga displays her acute senses, the detective starts to believe her.

Manikandan and Durga subsequently work together to find the cab driver, but all their leads turn up empty. Then, someone named Gowtham, comes forward. He is a motorcycle delivery boy who claims to have also witnessed the hit-and-run. Gowtham emphatically states that the car in question was not a cab but an imported sedan.

Later that night, when Gowtham is walking home alone, he is followed by Dr. James Dinah, a gynecologist who kidnaps and rapes young women. Gowtham tries to run but is struck by a brick. An ambulance arrives, and SI Manikandan and Durga drive to the scene. After being released, Gowtham sees Durga across the tracks at the Metro station, followed by James. He calls her and warns her about James. As he runs to catch up with her, she goes on FaceTime and shows him her location and surroundings. He guides her out of the Metro station and to safety. Durga reaches into her handbag and sprays James with pepper spray and runs off with Kanna, her seeing eye dog. James catches up with her in the elevator, however. He kills Kanna and injects Durga with a sedative.

When Durga regains consciousness, Gowtham is with her. At home, she gets a call from an unknown number. The caller warns her away from the case. A few days later, SI Manikandan and Durga visit Renuka, a friend of Sofia, one of James's victims, who reveals that Sofia was pregnant and had decided to get an abortion. To catch the killer, Durga disguises herself as a pregnant woman seeking an abortion. She finds James's secret clinic, and after a few turns of events, James ends up at the police station, whereupon he confesses to his crimes.

A fight ensues, in which Manikandan is killed and James escapes. Meanwhile, Gowtham and Durga are ambushed by the killer at an orphanage they are visiting. Gowtham fights James off while Durga runs to her car. The killer catches up to her, but she hits him on the head repeatedly, eventually killing him.

In the end, Durga has a new pair of eyes surgically implanted. At his remembrance ceremony, she reveals that they were donated to her by Manikandan.

== Cast ==
- Nayanthara in a dual role as:
  - Durga: A former trainee police officer who lost her eyesight in an accident
  - Nancy: a software engineer, Durga's lookalike, and James's wife
- Ajmal Ameer as Dr. James Dinah, a gynecologist who kidnaps, rapes, and kills young women
- K. Manikandan as SI Manikandan, a kind and innocent police officer who helps Durga with the case
- Saran Shakthi as Gowtham, a delivery boy who helps Durga in the case
- Redin Kingsley as Babu, James's agent
- Scooby as Kanna, Durga's seeing eye dog
- Sacchin Nachiappan as Aditya, Durga's adopted brother
- Lizzie Antony as Sofia's mother
- RJ Ananthi as Renuka, Sofia's friend
- Pradeep K Vijayan as veterinarian
- Supergood Subramani as a police officer
- Yaanai Joke Kathir as robber

== Production ==
The film was announced by producer Vignesh Shivan on his Twitter page in September 2019. Principal photography took place in 2020. The team had completed almost eighty percent of the filming before a lockdown was announced by the government due to the COVID-19 pandemic. Filming was completed in 2020.

== Music ==
Netrikann

Soundtrack album by Sid Sriram and Poorvi Koutish
- Released: 2021
- Recorded: 2021
- Genre: Soundtrack
- Label: Sony Music South
- Producer: Vignesh Shivan

Sid Sriram chronology
Teddy (2021)	Netrikann (2021)	Salmon 3D (2021)

Poorvi Koutish chronology
Dil Bechara (2020)	Netrikann (2021)	TBA (TBA)

The film soundtrack was composed by Girishh Gopalakrishnan, while Karthik Netha wrote the lyrics. The song "Idhuvum Kadandhu Pogum", sung by Sid Sriram, was released in June 2021; an alternate rendition was performed by Bombay Jayashri.

Track listing
No.	Title	Singer(s)	Length
1.	"Idhuvum Kadandhu Pogum"	Sid Sriram	05:15
2.	"Netrikann" (title track)	Poorvi Koutish	03:45
3.	"Idhuvum Kadandhu Pogum – Reprise"	Bombay Jayashri	05:15

== Release ==
Netrikann was released via Disney+ Hotstar on 13 August 2021.

== Reception ==
Janani K of India Today wrote, "Nayanthara's crime thriller is bland and illogical." Ancy K Sunny of The Week described the film as a "predictable thriller" and added that it tried to convey a social message. Baradwaj Rangan wrote for Film Companion, "After a while, the emotional angles begin to cohere well...the arc of the closing scenes is predictable — but again, the "believable heroism" makes it interesting to sit through. After a long time, we get a thriller that gets it mostly right, and a heroine-oriented film that gets it mostly right".
