= Naanum Rowdy Dhaan =

2015 Indian film by Vignesh Shivan

- Theatrical release poster
- Directed by: Vignesh Shivan
- Written by: Vignesh Shivan
- Produced by: Dhanush
- Starring: Vijay Sethupathi; Nayanthara; R. Parthiban
- Cinematography: George C. Williams
- Edited by: A. Sreekar Prasad
- Music by: Anirudh Ravichander
- Production company: Wunderbar Films
- Distributed by: Lyca Productions
- Release date: 21 October 2015
- Running time: 139 minutes
- Country: India
- Language: Tamil
- Budget: est. ₹13 crore

Naanum Rowdy Dhaan (transl. I too, am a rowdy) is a 2015 Indian Tamil-language romantic action comedy film written and directed by Vignesh Shivan, produced by Dhanush under his Wunderbar Films. The film stars Vijay Sethupathi and Nayanthara, with Radikaa Sarathkumar, RJ Balaji, Anandaraj, and R. Parthiban in supporting roles. It follows a police inspector's son who becomes a gangster. He falls in love with a woman seeking revenge against another gangster and joins her cause.

The film was announced in November 2013, with Gautham Vasudev Menon producing and Gautham Karthik and Lavanya Tripathi starring. However, the project was dropped, and by August 2014, Dhanush had taken over, with the lead pair recast. Principal photography commenced in December 2014 and ended in June 2015. The music was composed by Anirudh Ravichander, cinematography was handled by George C. Williams, and editing by A. Sreekar Prasad.

Naanum Rowdy Dhaan was released worldwide on 21 October 2015 and distributed by Lyca Productions. It received positive reviews and performed well at the box office. For her performance, Nayanthara won the Filmfare and SIIMA Awards for Best Actress in the Tamil branch.

== Plot ==
Pondicherry Pandiyan ("Pondy Pandi"), is the son of police inspector Meena Kumari. Despite that, he grows up being friendly with criminals and becomes a thug once reaching adulthood. Pandi and his friends consisting of Doshi Baba and Rahul Thatha come across a deaf woman, Kadhambari ("Kadhu"), whom Pandi immediately falls in love with. Kadhu is the daughter of the police officer, Ravikumar.

Fifteen years prior, Ravikumar was pursuing Killivallavan, a dreaded gangster. As revenge for being arrested and almost shot by Ravi, Killi sent a disguised bomb to Ravi's house. The bomb killed Ravi's wife and caused Kadhu's hearing loss. Later, Ravi and his daughter moved to another part of the country and did not return until his last year of service.

In the present day, Kadhu seeks Pandi's help to find her father, who she has not heard from in the past two days. Pandi soon learns that Ravi was killed by Killi the same night he met Kadhu, but he hides the fact from her. A week later, Kadhu learns about her father's death and is determined to avenge him by going after Killi.

Pandi agrees to help Kadhu kill Killi, the same way Killi had killed her father. Pandi and his gang, along with Kadhu and Pondicherry Don(a clumsy don whom Pandi along with his gang and Kadhu manage to befriend earlier), hatch a plan to kill Killi while he is travelling. However this plan fails, as it gets mixed up with that of Mansoor, Killi's political rival. Mansoor wants to contest an upcoming election in place of Killi's mistress. During the ensuing turmoil, one of Pandi's gang members, Rahul, goes missing. Pandi's gang is enraged and decide to not help Kadhu further.

Kadhu decides to proceed on her own after receiving a text from Rahul revealing Killi's whereabouts. She reaches Killi's hideout, but he knocks her unconscious. Her phone rings, and Killi answers it, listening to an unaware Pandi detail the plan to kill him. Pandi arrives at the hideout and tries to plead for Kadhu's life, but Killi and his men beat him up and imprison him with Kadhu. After he wakes up, Pandi fights Killi and his men, he also manages to escapes with Kadhu.

Mansoor and his men arrive and begin attacking Killi's men. Pondicherry Don along with his men and Rahul also arrive to rescue Pandi and Kadhu. While hiding, Pandi receives a call from Baba who tells him that Killi's men snatched his mother. Enraged, Pandi decides to kill Killi. He finds Killi hiding next door and grabs him as they had planned earlier, but Kadhu is unable to stab him. During this, Mansoor armed with a knife finds Killi about to kill Pandi with the glass Kadhu tried to kill him with earlier. Killi and Mansoor end up stabbing each other to death due to Pandi inadvertently stepping in front of them. Pandi falsely takes credit for their deaths to impress Kadhu after being acknowledged by the dying Killi as the "original rowdy" because he managed to escape getting stabbed.

Pandi, now disillusioned with the thug lifestyle, grieves the loss of his mother. He sees her and thinks she is visiting him in a dream, but he soon realises she is alive. Pandi ultimately becomes a police officer despite Kadhu still wanting him to be a rowdy.

== Cast ==
- Vijay Sethupathi as Pondicherry Pandiyan (Pondy Pandi)
  - Surya Sethupathi as young Pandi
- Nayanthara as Kadhambari "Kadhu"
  - Anikha Surendran as young Kadhu
- Radikaa Sarathkumar as Inspector Meena Kumari
- RJ Balaji as Doshi Baba
- Rajendran as Don Raja
- Azhagam Perumal as Inspector Ravikumar
- Anandaraj as Pondicherry Don
- R. Sundarrajan as Killi's advisor
- Mansoor Ali Khan as Mansoor
- R. N. R. Manohar as Thalaivar
- Meenakshi as Baby
- R. Parthiban as Killivalavan
- Aathma Patrick as Pondicherry Don's sidekick

Uncredited

- Udhayabanu as Rahul Thatha
- Sathish Krishnan in a special appearance

== Production ==
=== Development ===
In November 2013, Naanum Rowdy Dhaan was officially announced, to be directed by Vignesh Shivan and produced by Gautham Vasudev Menon, with Gautham Karthik as the lead actor and Anirudh Ravichander as composer. The film was titled after a dialogue spoken by Vadivelu in Thalainagaram (2006). Vignesh revealed that the film would be based on a 19-year-old youngster caught in the midst of a gang setting and noted he hoped to shoot in Mumbai, Chennai, and Pondicherry. However, the project failed to take off. On 29 August 2014, coinciding with Ganesh Chaturthi, Dhanush announced via Twitter that he would be producing the film under his Wunderbar Films banner and also posted details about the cast and crew and the title design. While George C. Williams was the cinematographer, Vijay Sethupathi and Nayanthara were announced as the new lead pair.

=== Casting ===
Lavanya Tripathi was cast as the lead actress opposite Gautham Karthik when the project was under Menon's control. Vignesh has stated that Anirudh was his first choice for the lead role, but he decided against casting him to avoid distracting him from music, his "greatest passion". He also said Sethupathi and Nayanthara accepted the project without hearing the complete script. Ashok Selvan stated that he was considered for the lead role before Sethupathi was cast. Sethupathi stated that he had put on weight for some of his recent roles, so he worked hard for two months to shed those pounds. He worked out and went on an extensive diet regimen as well —even forgoing food at times. Sethupathi's son Surya made his acting debut in the film, portraying the younger version of his father's character.

Vignesh revealed the makers were apprehensive about approaching R. Parthiban to portray the antagonist, as the actor was not known to readily accept any role, but he immediately accepted the offer and added his own ideas to the character. RJ Balaji joined the cast shortly after filming began. He has stated that he was not initially interested in joining but accepted due to his friendship with Sethupathi and because Nayanthara was in the cast. Anandaraj joined the film's roster while filming was taking place in Pondicherry and said his character was inspired by the one played by Govinda in the 2014 Hindi film Kill Dil.

=== Filming ===
Principal photography began on 3 December 2014, with the first leg of the venture held in Pondicherry over a span of forty days. Some scenes were shot at the Thirukameeswarar Temple in Villianur during this schedule. According to Sethupathi, during the first four days of filming, he and Vignesh had clashes due to disagreements over the portrayal of the lead character. The first schedule was completed in early January 2015, and soon after, the team began filming the second schedule. By mid-May 2015, major portions of the film had been completed. The final schedule started in Pondicherry on 19 May 2015. Principal photography wrapped in June 2015. Nayanthara dubbed herself for her character for the first time in Tamil.

== Soundtrack ==
The soundtrack to Naanum Rowdy Dhaan is composed by Anirudh Ravichander. It features six tracks, five of which were penned by Vignesh himself, and the sixth one was written by Thamarai. Instead of having an audio launch, the songs were released as singles.

== Release ==
In September 2015, Lyca Productions announced that they had bought the distribution rights for Naanum Rowdy Dhaan. The filmmakers initially announced that the film would be released on 2 October 2015. However, it was later postponed to 21 October. Naanum Rowdy Dhaan was published to audiences outside India by Herotalkies on 15 November 2015, through their online film streaming portal.

=== Critical reception ===
Writing for The Times of India, M. Suganth gave the film four out of five stars and wrote, "The plot might come across as a serious revenge drama, but Vignesh Shivan displays a lightness of touch throughout that makes the film so much fun. And, he keeps things breezy even when situations get serious". Sify wrote, "Vignesh Sivan's Naanum Rowdy Dhaan (NRD) is a feel-good laugh riot, a perfect movie to hang out with friends. You are guaranteed loads of fun and sure to come out with a big smile on your face". S. Saraswathi of Rediff.com gave it 3.5 out of 5 and stated, "Simple, sweet and uncomplicated, Naanum Rowdy Dhaan is a refreshing romantic comedy that deserves a watch". Sudhir Srinivasan of The Hindu said, "Almost all the jokes, both subtle and loud, work. And they're everywhere, and often admirably, without heed to political correctness". Mike McCahill of The Guardian gave it 3 out of 5 stars and wrote, "Despite some rough edges and missed opportunities, Vignesh Shivan delivers a well-written, likably played film where every element feels integrated and thought through".

=== Box office ===
Naanum Rowdy Dhaan grossed around ₹9 crore (equivalent to ₹15 crore or US$1.5 million in 2026) in the first five days of its release. According to an estimate by Dinamalar, the film's early success was due to it being released during the Ayudha Puja and Vijayadashami holiday season. The website estimated that it grossed more than ₹50 crore (equivalent to ₹82 crore or US$8.6 million in 2026).

== Accolades ==
Event	Category	Recipient(s)	Outcome	Ref.
2015 Behindwoods Gold Medals	Best Editor	A. Sreekar Prasad	Won	
63rd Filmfare Awards South	Best Actress – Tamil	Nayanthara	Won	
63rd Filmfare Awards South	Best Supporting Actor – Tamil	Parthiban	Nominated	
63rd Filmfare Awards South	Best Music Director – Tamil	Anirudh Ravichander	Nominated	
63rd Filmfare Awards South	Best Lyricist – Tamil	Vignesh Shivan (for "Thangame")	Nominated	
63rd Filmfare Awards South	Best Male Playback Singer – Tamil	Anirudh Ravichander (for "Thangame")	Nominated	
63rd Filmfare Awards South	Best Female Playback Singer – Tamil	Neeti Mohan (for "Neeyum Naanum")	Nominated	
5th South Indian International Movie Awards	Best Film – Tamil	Naanum Rowdy Dhaan	Nominated	
5th South Indian International Movie Awards	Best Director – Tamil	Vignesh Shivan	Won	
5th South Indian International Movie Awards	Best Actress – Tamil	Nayanthara	Won	
5th South Indian International Movie Awards	Best Comedian – Tamil	RJ Balaji	Won	
5th South Indian International Movie Awards	Best Lyricist – Tamil	Vignesh Shivan (for "Yennai Maatrum Kadhale")	Nominated	
5th South Indian International Movie Awards	Best Music Director – Tamil	Anirudh Ravichander	Nominated	
5th South Indian International Movie Awards	Best Female Playback Singer – Tamil	Neeti Mohan (for "Neeyum Naanum")	Nominated	
5th South Indian International Movie Awards	Best Male Playback Singer – Tamil	Anirudh Ravichander (for "Thangame")	Won	
2nd IIFA Utsavam	Best Actress (Tamil)	Nayanthara	Nominated	
2nd IIFA Utsavam	Best Supporting Actor (Tamil)	RJ Balaji	Nominated	
2nd IIFA Utsavam	Best Actor in Comedy Role (Tamil)	RJ Balaji	Won	
2nd IIFA Utsavam	Best Supporting Actress (Tamil)	Radikaa Sarathkumar	Nominated	
2nd IIFA Utsavam	Best Music Director (Tamil)	Anirudh Ravichander	Nominated	
2nd IIFA Utsavam	Best Lyricist (Tamil)	Thamarai (for "Neeyum Naanum")	Nominated	
2nd IIFA Utsavam	Best Playback Singer Male (Tamil)	Anirudh Ravichander (for "Thangame")	Won	
2nd IIFA Utsavam	Best Playback Singer Female (Tamil)	Neeti Mohan (for "Neeyum Naanum")	Won	

== Controversies ==
Shortly after Lyca Productions announced that they had acquired the film's distribution rights, members of the political party Ilaya Thalaimurai Katchi condemned Wunderbar Films for selling the rights to them. Iniyan John of the party noted Lyca founder Allirajah Subaskaran's links to Sri Lankan politician Mahinda Rajapaksa, who was responsible for the deaths of "hundreds of thousands of Tamils" during the Sri Lankan civil war in 2009. Lyca had earlier attracted protests when they produced their first Tamil film, Kaththi (2014), for the same reasons, and were forced to remove their name from promotional material. John noted the production house contradicted the Tamil Nadu Directors Association's promise that they would not engage in film production or distribution in Tamil Nadu.

In early 2015, a video clip in which Nayanthara is seen buying beer went viral on social media before the film's release. The political party Hindu Makkal Katchi (HMK) opposed the scene and demanded it be deleted, otherwise during the film's release, they would protest against the film and Nayanthara. In Chennai, HMK put up signs showing portraits of Nayanthara draped with a beer-bottle garland. After Nayanthara released a statement saying it was just a scene in the film, her effigy was publicly burned by members of another political party, the Hindu Munnani.

== Legacy ==
According to Janani K of India Today, Naanum Rowdy Dhaan was a breakthrough for Nayanthara. The actress later went on to star in Kolamaavu Kokila (2018), described by its producers Lyca as a dark comedy "on the lines of" the earlier film. Her character's line "Ongala podanum sir" (transl. I want to kill you sir) inspired the title of a 2019 film, and Sethupathi's line "Are you okay baby?" became the title of a 2023 film. The film's title also inspired Nayanthara and Vignesh to establish a production company, Rowdy Pictures. In 2024, Nayanthara considered Naanum Rowdy Dhaan the "most special and important film" in her career and was upset that Dhanush did not allow her to include clips from it in the documentary Nayanthara: Beyond the Fairytale, about her life and career. Udhayabanu, who played a character named "Rahul Thatha", became popularly known by that name in the film industry.
