= Super (2010 Indian film) =

- Poster
- Directed by: Upendra
- Written by: Upendra
- Produced by: Rockline Venkatesh
- Starring: Upendra; Nayanthara; Sadhu Kokila
- Cinematography: Ashok Kashyap
- Edited by: Thirupathi Reddy
- Music by: V. Harikrishna
- Production company: Rockline Productions
- Distributed by: Rockline Productions
- Release date: 3 December 2010
- Running time: 135 minutes
- Country: India
- Language: Kannada

Super (originally known only by the Vitarka Mudrā hand symbol, 👌) is a 2010 Indian Kannada-language dystopian political drama film written and directed by Upendra. With the title of the film depicted only by a symbol, its stars Upendra and Nayanthara and is produced by Rockline Venkatesh, while V. Harikrishna scored the music. The film was released on 3 December 2010 in its Kannada version, and on 11 March 2011 in its Telugu version, which had a few scenes reshot with Ali and Sadhu Kokila switching roles. This utopian film has a concept of a contrasting futuristic India set in the year 2030, and the contemporary image of India.

The film revolves around Subash, a non-resident Indian who is challenged by his fiancée who has a modern outlook, to change India. The film shows Subash trying to bring change to India. The film generated large amounts of coverage in media, as it marked the end of Upendra's ten-year hiatus from directing. The film received positive critical acclaim, with critics praising the concept and screenplay.

== Plot ==
Subash Chandra Gandhi resides in London and owns the multi-billion dollar company, Gandhi and Gandhi. He falls in love with Indira; because he hopes that she is a traditional girl. Indira, however, is on a mission to kill Gandhi, since he is responsible for her older sister falling into a coma.

After Indira left him, she gives Gandhi the challenge to remain an ordinary citizen in India, disclosing her mission. Gandhi goes to Bangalore to attempt her challenge but fails miserably. Societal attitudes deeply disturb him, and when his father reaches Bangalore from London to take him back, Gandhi makes the decision to continue residing in India and change the fortune of the common man.

Around this time, Indira, now also in India, hatches a plot to kill Gandhi. With 10 million pounds from his father in India, Gandhi starts a multinational company of Rowdies, subsequently becoming the chief minister of the state.

After becoming the chief minister, Gandhi rapes Indira, while an Indian state gets auctioned off.

== Cast ==
- Upendra as Subhash Chandra Gandhi
  - The name is a portmanteau of Subhash Chandra Bose and Mahatma Gandhi—the former is known for his revolutionary views to attaining Indian freedom, and the latter, for his non-violence (Note: Gandhi had a clash with Bose, who had been elected president in 1938. Their main points of contention were Bose's lack of commitment to democracy, and lack of faith in non-violence.)
- Nayanthara as Indira
- Tulip Joshi as Mandira, Indira's elder sister
- R. N. Sudarshan as Subash's father
- Shylashri as Subash's mother
- Sadhu Kokila and Ali as the Chaddi brothers
  - The term chaddi means shorts and is a parody on the Bellary Reddy Brothers who are alleged to have involved in mining scam)
- Jeeva as Police Officer
- Kadhal Dhandapani as Chief Minister
- Deepak Madhuvanahalli as the Chief Minister in 2030

Yogaraj Bhat narrated the film while producer Rockline Venkatesh guest stars as the leader of a folk dance troupe.

== Production ==
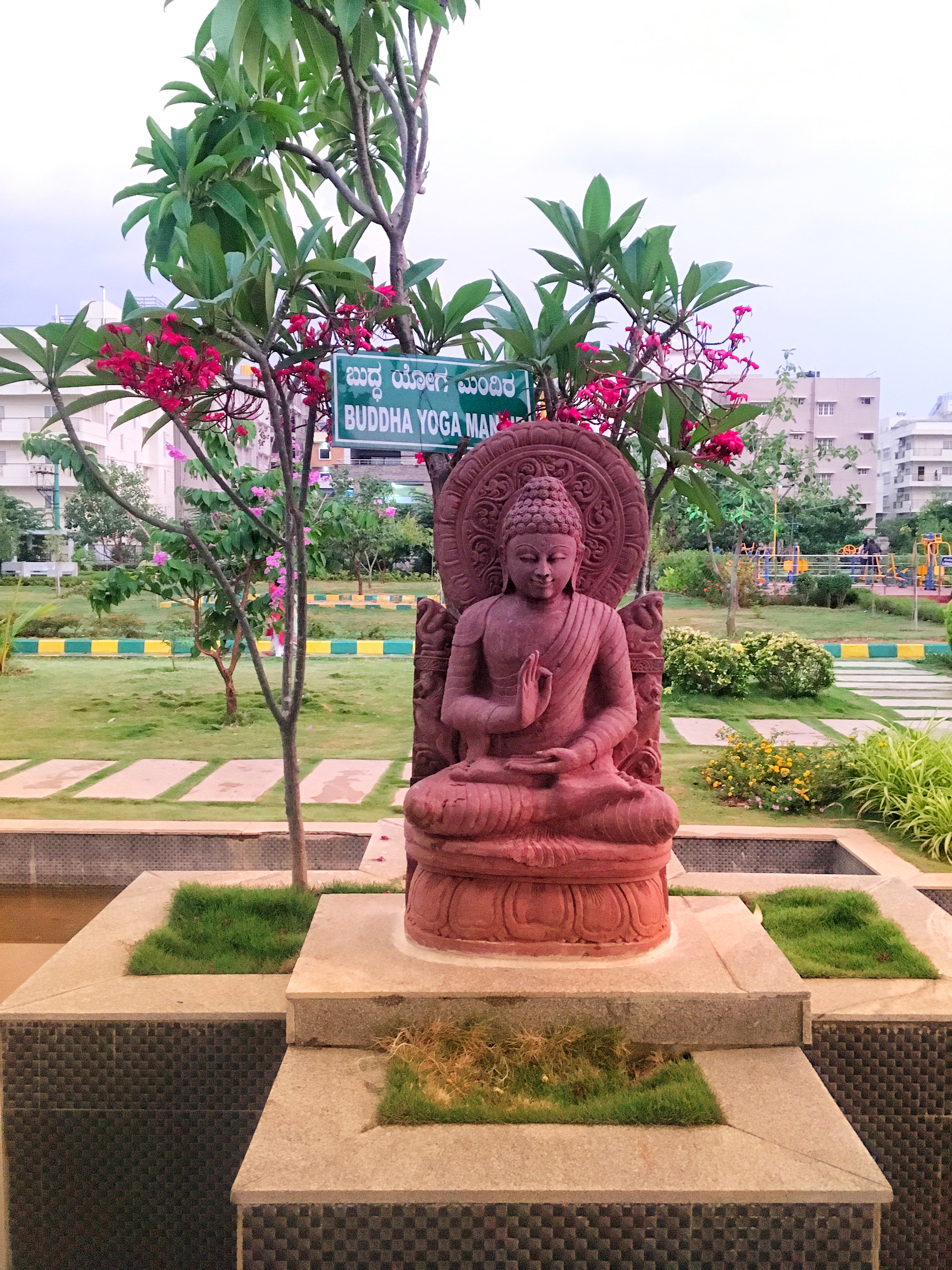
Buddha statue showing the Vitarka mudra, hand gesture.

Upendra returned to direction after nearly ten years. The nameless film was originally represented only by the hand symbol (seen in posters) and Upendra wanted the audience to name the film. The hand symbol could mean zero, or three or the Om symbol or Vitarka Mudrā (an ancient Buddhist gesture), public and media stuck to calling it Super.

Shooting began on 18 February 2010 at the Kanteerava Indoor Stadium with the planned schedule for 90 days which included various locations in Bengaluru, Dubai and London. It was produced by Rockline Venkatesh under the banner Rockline Productions, which is its 25th venture. The film saw the debut of actress Nayanthara in Kannada films. The film was initially planned as a multilingual film.

Prior to release, much information about the film was kept under wraps. During the promotion of the film at an interview on a radio station, Upendra expressed his disappointment being labeled as a "different director" and explained that most of his directorial ventures deal with the things that he had undergone in his real life. When asked about the ten-year break, Upendra said he thought he would work on his acting career, but then it sucked him in like a vacuum which he could not get out of. After reaching a point where he was afraid he had lost his ability to direct films, he had to fight his fear and that is when he started working on the script of Super.

== Theme ==
A symbol being the title of the film, it is replete with symbolism from the title sequence is displayed.

Super depicts a Utopian India in the year 2030 where Indians are pictured to be wealthy, hard-working, and are seen wearing traditional clothing consisting of Ilkal saree and panche. In contrast, westerners are the ones taking care of menial jobs like taxi driving, janitorial, etc. It is a future where the Indian rupee is worth 70 times the pound sterling and people who cannot speak Kannada are considered illiterates (and Westerners are visibly apologetic about the same). From this setting, the film regresses back to the current year 2010 where India is beset with problems of corruption, red-tapism, pollution and unemployment. Political satire is played out by using sounds of horses and donkeys when ministers appear on the screen, which represents the political horse trading witnessed in recent times in the state of Karnataka. Scenes of raping Indira and the auctioning process of an entire Indian state are interspersed to draw a parallel between the two. The film finds a climax back in 2030 where a foreigner asks an Indian as to who was responsible for all the good changes in India, and the film ends abruptly again with the index finger pointing at the audience, symbolizing that it's the people who are ultimately responsible for the course of a nation.

== Soundtrack ==
Super

Soundtrack album by V. Harikrishna
- Released: 19 November 2010
- Genre: Film soundtrack
- Label: Akash Audio
- Producer: V. Harikrishna

The Super soundtrack album rights was acquired by Madhu Bangarappa of Akash Audio for a record price of ₹12.5 million. Composed by V Harikrishna, the album has five songs and Upendra has penned lyrics for three and remaining two have been written by Yograj Bhat and V Manohar. It was officially released on 19 November at Leela Palace by Puneeth Rajkumar and Raghavendra Rajkumar.

Unlicensed copies of the album were available online within hours after the release, and a team was formed by the production unit to fight audio infringement. This resulted in some Kannada music websites being brought down permanently.

| No. | Title | Lyrics | Singer(s) | Length |
|---|---|---|---|---|
| 1. | "Kaayi Kaayi Uppinakaayi" | Upendra | Kunal Ganjawala, Chorus |
| 2. | "Sikkapatte Ishtapatte" | Yograj Bhat | Upendra |
| 3. | "Come on Come on" | V. Manohar | Rahul Nambiar |
| 4. | "Yeri Mele Yeri" | Upendra | SPB, Shamitha Malnad, Upendra |
| 5. | "Look at the Style" | Upendra | Naveen Madhav |

== Release ==
=== India ===
In Karnataka, the film was released at over 180 theaters on 3 December 2010. The Telugu version of the film was released on 11 March 2011 in more than 95 screens across Andhra Pradesh. Fearing copyright violation, the production team postponed the international release to mid-2011 as there were chances of film getting leaked on the Internet during overseas release. It was also screened at the fourth Bengaluru International Film Festival (BIFF) in December 2011 as part of the 'political satire' category. The film was later dubbed into Hindi as Rowdy Leader 2 by Goldmines Telefilms in 2017.

=== Overseas release ===
Super was released in the US by Upendra's close friend Shivamurthy. The film was released in Australia in late August 2011, by a Kannada film distributor in Australia, Arunroopesh. It was screened in Melbourne, Sydney, Adelaide, Brisbane and Perth.

== Reception ==
=== Box office ===
==== Kannada ====
In Karnataka, the film was released at over 180 theaters on 3 December 2010. The film reported sold-out shows all over the state of Karnataka. Some fans who could not get hold of tickets any other way bought them on the black market. It celebrated 100 days of run at over 90 centres, 125 days of run at its main centre and 175 days of run at PVR in Bangalore.

==== Telugu ====
After receiving good response for the audio track, Super was released in Andhra Pradesh in its Telugu version on 11 March 2011. Screened at more than 95 theaters across Andhra Pradesh, Super had an opening across the state. Upendra was quite happy about receiving extraordinary reviews from Telugu and English daily newspapers and websites. The distributors were quite happy about the response received throughout Andhra Pradesh. According to the box office analysts of Andhra Pradesh, the film surprisingly caught the attention of the B, C centre audience in a big way and scored good success.

=== Critical reception ===
Critically, the film was widely well received with the Times of India rating it 4/5 stars and describing that the film "succeeds in keeping the audience entertained with witty dialogs, neat script and lively narration, along with Upendra's antics, and, at times, his strange make-up." Deccan Herald termed the film as "something extraordinary" and praised Upendra's grand return to the direction "by confusing and exciting the audience right from the movie’s inception, with a hotchpotch of his trademark films and roles" while downplaying the characterization of heroines.

Sify called it a "revolutionary concept" in story-telling which "will make people ponder over the contemporary events and see how the country is plundered by the greedy politicians and corporate community." DNA India also rated it 4/5 stars with a consensus that "Upendra still has all it takes to churn movies that are 'his style,' but contemporary in nature and he puts forth a message through this film as well, as he ruthlessly mocks the current political scenario."

== Special screenings ==
In 2011, Rajinikanth attended a private screening of Super arranged by the producer Rockline Venkatesh. "It all started a couple of months ago when I met Rajini sir and told him about the film I was going to produce with Uppi as director. When he heard the story of the film, he was very happy," said Rockline. "When he learnt that it was a hit, he was thrilled and asked me to hold a screening for him, too." After the screening, Rajinikanth commented: "I like watching Upendra's films and this was no exception. He is an excellent director and is one of a kind in the country. The kind of subject he has chosen is excellent. We need more films of this kind which are thought-provoking and also well-made. It's amazing that a film of this scale has been made in Kannada. If I get an opportunity and an impressive script, I'd like to do a Kannada film in the future."

The film saw a special screening in Infosys at its Mysore campus where thousands of employees, which included non-Kannadigas, watched the film. It was screened at the fourth Bangalore International Film Festival (BIFF) in December 2011.

== Awards ==
| Award | Category | Recipient | Result | Ref. |
|---|---|---|---|---|
| 58th Filmfare Awards South | Best Film | Rockline Productions | Nominated | |
| 58th Filmfare Awards South | Best Director | Upendra | Nominated | |
| 58th Filmfare Awards South | Best Actor | Upendra | Nominated | |
| 58th Filmfare Awards South | Best Actress | Nayanthara | Nominated | |
| 58th Filmfare Awards South | Best Lyricist | V. Manohar for "Come On Come On Director" | Nominated | |
| 58th Filmfare Awards South | Best Playback Singer - Male | Upendra for "Sikka Patte" | Nominated | |
| 2010–11 Karnataka State Film Awards | Special Jury Award (for graphics) | Super | Won | |
| 2013 Udaya Film Awards | Best Screenplay | Upendra | Won | |
| Suvarna Film Awards 2011 | Favorite Film Award | Super | Won | |
| Suvarna Film Awards 2011 | Favorite Director Award | Upendra | Won | |
