= Anaamika =

2014 Indian film by Sekhar Kammula

- Theatrical release poster in Telugu
- Directed by: Sekhar Kammula
- Screenplay by: Yandamuri Veerendranath; Sekhar Kammula
- Based on: Kahaani (Hindi) by Sujoy Ghosh
- Produced by: Deepak Dhar; Sameer Gogate; Rajnish Khanuja; Sameer Rajendran
- Starring: Nayantara; Pasupathy; Vaibhav Reddy; Harshvardhan Rane
- Cinematography: Vijay C. Kumar
- Edited by: Marthand K. Venkatesh
- Music by: M. M. Keeravani
- Production companies: Logline Productions; Select Media Holdings
- Distributed by: Viacom 18 Motion Pictures
- Release date: 1 May 2014
- Running time: 145 minutes
- Country: India
- Languages: Telugu; Tamil

Anaamika (transl. Nameless) or Nee Enge En Anbe (transl. Where are you, my dear?) is a 2014 Indian mystery thriller film directed by Sekhar Kammula which marks his Tamil debut, starring Nayanthara in the title role, alongside Pasupathy, Vaibhav Reddy, and Harshvardhan Rane. A remake of the Hindi film Kahaani. The film was simultaneously shot in Telugu and Tamil respectively.

Since the film is set in Hyderabad, many of the Telugu dialogues are retained in the Tamil version.

== Plot ==
The story revolves around Anaamika, an IT professional, who arrives in Hyderabad in search of her missing husband, Ajay. She goes to the police station to file a complaint but is ignored by the officers. However, one policeman named Sarathy decides to help her, and their search for Ajay begins. Anaamika visits the hotel where her husband last stayed, but the manager denies his presence. She proves otherwise by accurately describing the state of a specific room based on Ajay's description. She befriends a little boy named Raju, who helps her navigate the local area. Together with Sarathy, Anaamika visits the company where her husband worked and discovers that he had resigned two weeks before. They also learn from Raju that Ajay was kidnapped by four goons. Anaamika informs the police about this, and the hotel manager gives her Ajay's clothes, admitting that he misled her to protect the hotel's reputation. They try to identify the goons through a lineup but are unsuccessful. Anaamika confirms that an unidentified body in the mortuary is not Ajay.

Later, they attend a Durga pooja where a set of blessed bangles and a dress are given. Sarathy promises to take Anaamika to an informant the next day. They find the informant who informs them about students discussing a recent kidnapping. They try to speak with the Imam, but he refuses and laments the negative perception of madrassas in the area. However, the Imam feels compelled to help Anaamika and contacts Sarathy. He compares a photo of Ajay to one from his wedding day and realizes they are the same person. Unfortunately, the Imam is later killed by a visitor.

Anaamika and Sarathy attend a wedding where they encounter Sarathy's boss, Ravi Chandra. Ravi reveals his knowledge of Ajay's kidnapping and offers to help Anaamika in exchange for an affair. She rejects his advances and escapes his harassment. Anaamika meets Ravi Chandra again and agrees to an affair if he finds Ajay within 24 hours. Ravi starts investigating Ajay's disappearance but is later murdered by the same person who killed the Imam.

A senior officer named Khan learns about Ajay's resemblance to a bombing suspect. He begins an investigation and interrogates Anaamika. However, she remains steadfast in her beliefs, causing Khan to calm down and agree to investigate Ajay's disappearance. Anaamika pays respects at People's Plaza with Sarathy before heading to Ravi Chandra's home to find answers. The assassin arrives, and a scuffle ensues. Anaamika kills the assassin, but Sarathy is unaware and takes the gun from her. Khan arrives and questions them, unaware of the hard drive Anaamika possesses.

Anaamika combs through the hard drive and contacts several phone numbers, including the Home Minister's. The police raid her room, but she manages to keep the hard drive hidden. She receives a video of Ajay, promising his safe return in exchange for the hard disk. Anaamika agrees to meet the kidnappers on a bridge at midnight. Sarathy continues investigating and identifies Laxman, an employee who coerced his sister into the kidnapping. They confront Laxman, who has a photo matching one found in the Imam's album.

At midnight, Anaamika meets the kidnappers on the bridge, unaware that the police have surrounded it. Laxman takes the hard drive, and Ajay is returned to Anaamika. As they leave, the police incinerate the kidnappers' car. The Home Minister demands the hard disk, but Khan and Sarathy destroy the evidence. Anaamika and Ajay visit People's Plaza, where she reveals her knowledge of his actions and kills him in self-defense. She leaves the hard drive for Khan and departs. Khan and Sarathy find the hard drive and decide not to expose its contents, considering Anaamika a hero. In the end, Anaamika's actions are recognized, and Khan resolves to keep her secret.

== Cast ==
- Nayanthara as Anamika Sastry (Voice dubbed by Sunitha)
- Naresh as Home Minister Aadhikesavayya
- Pasupathy as ACP Ajmad Ali Khan IPS
- Vaibhav Reddy as SI Parthasarathi
- Harshvardhan Rane as Ajay Sastry/Milan Damji
- Thagubothu Ramesh as Taxi Driver
- Vinay Varma as CI Ravi Chandra
- Dheer Charan Srivastav as Hotel Manager
- Vinod Chelambathodi as Lakshman
- Mohsin Raja as Imaam
- Master KVJ Harsha as Raju
- C. V. L. Narasimha Rao as Anaamika's father
- Sriranjani as Parthasarathi's mother (uncredited)

== Production ==
Jyothika was the initial choice for the lead role, but she was later replaced by actress Nayanthara. Nayanthara, with an all-new look, kick-started her Sekhar Kammula bilingual film in Telugu and Tamil on April 28 in Hyderabad. Nayanthara was given a bound script that included details about the look of her character's costume. She had an all-new look in the film, and the actress had committed to giving bulk dates for the production. The film was co-produced by Endemol India, Logline Productions, and Select Media Holdings.

The shoot on Sunday in the dusty streets of Old City, Hyderabad. Instead of Kolkata, as in the original, Sekhar chose Old City as the location where the film was set.

Sekhar was planning to complete the project under 50 days by shooting continuously in old Hyderabad. Sekhar in an interview had said: "Since this untitled film is a bilingual, there's lot of work involved even before we start shooting. I want to shift all focus on the project which will be adapted and customised to the local sensibilities."

== Soundtrack ==
The music was composed by M. M. Keeravani.

All lyrics are written by Sirivennela Seetharama Sastry.

Telugu Track listing
No.	Title	Singer(s)	Length
1.	"Kshanam Kshanam"	Sunitha	4:15
2.	"The Search"	Sunitha	1:48
3.	"Dead or Alive"	Sunitha	1:51
4.	"Adham Lo Ammayi"	Deepu	3:49
Total length:			11:43

Tamil Track listing
No.	Title	Singer(s)	Length
1.	"Idho Idho"	Swetha Mohan	1:56
Total length:			1:56

== Release ==
=== Anaamika ===
The Times of India gave Anaamika three out of five stars and wrote that "Comparisons are inevitable when one remakes a critically acclaimed film like Vidya Balan starrer Kahani and in the case of Anaamika, Sekhar Kammula almost gets away because he deviates from the original plot to a large extent".

=== Nee Enge En Anbe ===
Nee Enge En Anbe was rated 3 by Rediff who said that "Kahaani was a huge hit so much was expected of the remake. Unfortunately, Nee Enge En Anbe is not in the same league". Deccan Chronicle said that "For those who have not seen Kahaani, this is a perfect 10 on 10 movie and for those who have, well all we can say is it is one of the better remakes". Sify gave 4/5, stating " Nee Enge En Anbe on the face of it is a decent thriller, marked by an outstanding performance by Nayanthara, who is scintillating as she brings depth and poise to her character. Plus technically it is fab, with excellent background score by MM Keeravani which is in sync with the theme of the film along with camera work of Vijay C Kumar." Hindustan Times said "Nee Enge En Anbe's plot and narrative style gripped me as much as Kahaani's did. The Tamil movie is mounted well, and although it is not a nail-biting thriller, it is still very engaging. I did not find a dull moment, thanks also to some smart" and gave 3 out of 5. Baradwaj Rangan of The Hindu wrote "Without atmosphere, a movie is just a collection of scenes that fit oddly, like misshapen jigsaw pieces. We may be able to get a sense of the whole puzzle, but only in our heads. We sense what could have been. What we see, though, is someone labouring to make the pieces fit. It isn't pretty". A critic from Bangalore Mirror wrote that the film "appears more of a Tollywood flick dubbed in Tamil as the Telugu flavour is written all over it".
