= Nayanthara =

Indian actress and film producer (born 1980)

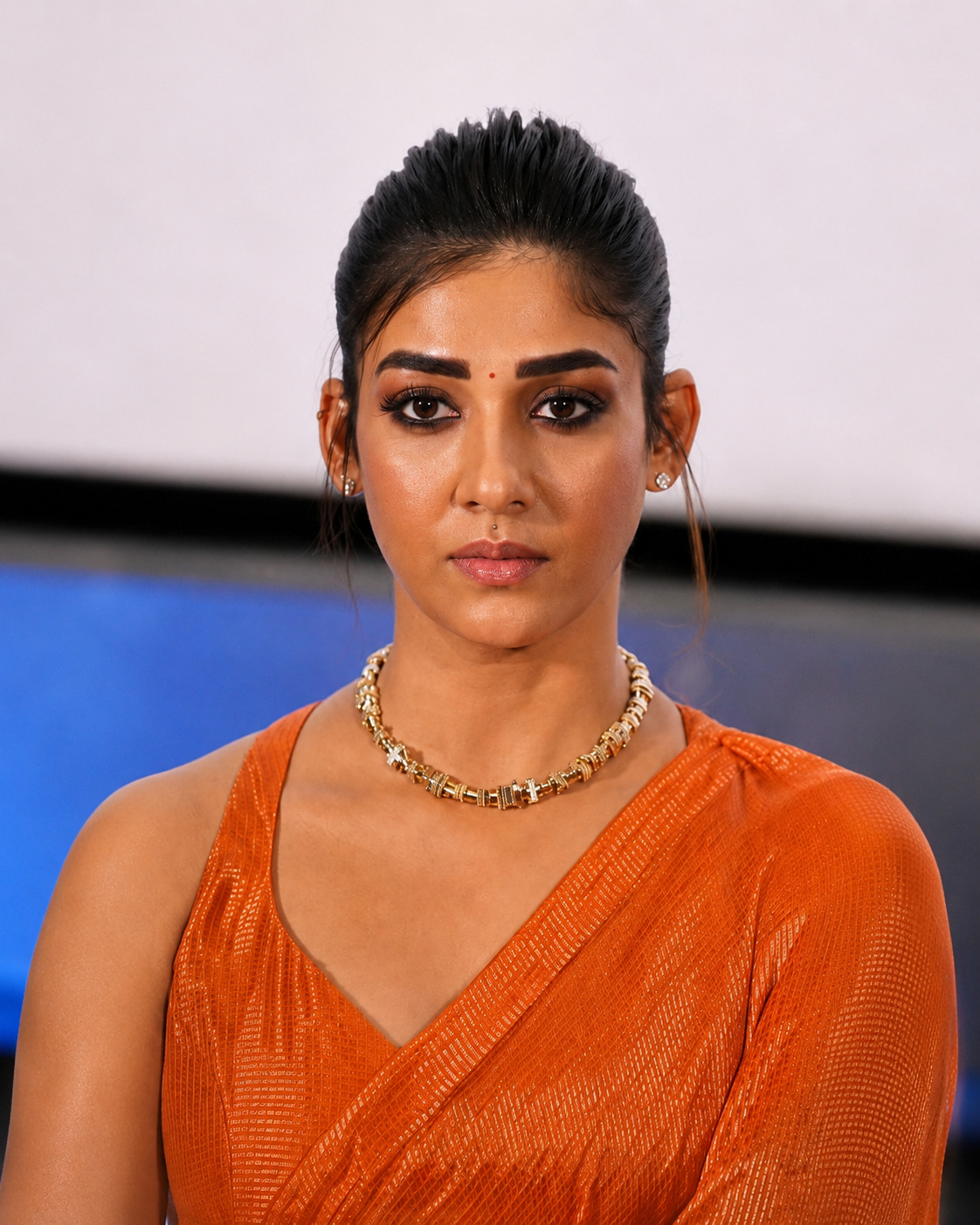
- Nayanthara in 2026
- Born: Diana Mariam Kurian; 18 November 1984 (age 41); Bangalore, Karnataka, India
- Education: Mar Thoma College (BA)
- Occupations: Actress; film producer
- Years active: 2003–present
- Works: Full list
- Spouse: Vignesh Shivan (m. 2022)
- Children: 2
- Awards: Full list

Nayanthara (born Diana Mariam Kurian; 18 November 1984) is an Indian actress and producer known for her work in Tamil, Telugu and Malayalam films. One of the highest-paid actresses in India, she was the only South Indian actress to be featured in Forbes India "Celebrity 100" list in 2018. With a career spanning over two decades, she has appeared in more than 75 films and has received numerous awards, including five Filmfare Awards South, three Tamil Nadu State Film Awards, a Nandi Award and seven SIIMA Awards.

Nayanthara made her acting debut with the Malayalam film Manassinakkare in 2003. She debuted in Tamil cinema with Ayya in 2005, in Telugu with Lakshmi in 2006 and Kannada with Super in 2010. Her portrayal of Goddess Sita in the mythological film Sri Rama Rajyam (2011) earned her the Filmfare Award for Best Actress – Telugu and the Nandi Award for Best Actress. She won the Filmfare Award for Best Actress – Tamil and Tamil Nadu State Film Award for Best Actress for her performances in the romantic comedy Raja Rani (2013), the action comedy Naanum Rowdy Dhaan (2015) and the political drama Aramm (2017), for which she won Tamil Nadu State Film Award for Best Actress. She was awarded the Filmfare Award for Best Actress – Malayalam for her performance in the crime drama Puthiya Niyamam (2016).

Nayanthara established herself as one of the leading actresses of South Indian cinema, particularly through female-led films such as Anaamika (2014), Maya (2015), Dora (2017), Aramm (2017), Imaikkaa Nodigal (2018), Airaa (2019), Mookuthi Amman (2020), Netrikann (2021) and Annapoorani: The Goddess of Food (2023). Beyond these roles, she has starred in several commercially and critically successful films, including Chandramukhi (2005), Ghajini (2005), Billa (2007), Yaaradi Nee Mohini (2008), Body Guard (2010), Krishnam Vande Jagadgurum (2012), Thani Oruvan (2015), Kaashmora (2016), Viswasam (2019), Bigil (2019), Sye Raa Narasimha Reddy (2019). She also made her Hindi film debut with Jawan in 2023, which succeeded commercially and became her highest-grossing film .

In addition to acting, Nayanthara is involved in philanthropy and owns the production house called "Rowdy Pictures". She is married to filmmaker Vignesh Shivan, and the couple has two children.

== Early life ==
Nayanthara was born as Diana Mariam Kurian on 18 November 1984 in Bangalore, Karnataka. Nayanthara belongs to a Malayali Syrian Christian family hails from Thiruvalla, Kerala, and was born to Kurian Kodiyattu and Omana Kurian. Her elder brother, Leno, lives in Dubai, United Arab Emirates. As her father was an Indian Air Force official, Nayanthara studied in various parts of India.

Nayanthara did her schooling in Jamnagar, Gujarat and Delhi. She studied at O.E.M Public School in Eraviperoor, Balikamadom Girls Higher Secondary School, Thirumoolapuram in Thiruvalla and then attended Mar Thoma College, Tiruvalla for her bachelor's degree in English Literature.

== Career ==
=== Debut and early work (2003–2007) ===
She began her acting career in 2003 with the Malayalam film Manassinakkare. While studying at college, Nayanthara worked part-time as a model. She was spotted by director Sathyan Anthikkad, who had seen some of her modelling assignments and approached her to play a pivotal role in his film Manassinakkare (2003). Although she turned down the offer initially, as she was not interested in films, she gave in eventually and agreed to do "just that one film". Manassinakkare went on to become a big financial success and she continued to receive acting offers. Both her releases in 2004, Natturajavu by Shaji Kailas, and Fazil's psychological thriller Vismayathumbathu, saw her co-starring alongside Mohanlal; while she played the protagonist's adopted sister in the former, she portrayed a ghost in the latter. Her performance in Vismayathumbathu, in particular, was lauded, with critics claiming that she had "stolen the thunder with her author-backed role", and was "the revelation of the film".

Nayanthara subsequently started appearing in Tamil and Telugu films. In 2005, she was cast in Hari's Ayya, debuting in the Tamil film industry as lead heroine of the movie. Behindwoods.com stated that she had made a "sensational debut in Tamil", while a reviewer from Nowrunning.com said that her "presence with her beautiful smile is crowd winning". While still shooting for Ayya, she was selected for the comedy horror film Chandramukhi, after its director P. Vasu's wife had seen Manassinakkare and recommended her. The film ran for over 800 days in theatres, eventually turning Nayanthara into one of the most-sought after actresses in Tamil. She also acted in Malayalam, Thaskara Veeran and Rappakal both co-starring with Mammootty. Later that year she appeared in AR Murugadoss' Ghajini, in which she played a secondary female character.She was also portrayed in an item song in the film. Nayanthara then accepted to appear in an item number as herself in the Perarasu-directed masala film Sivakasi.

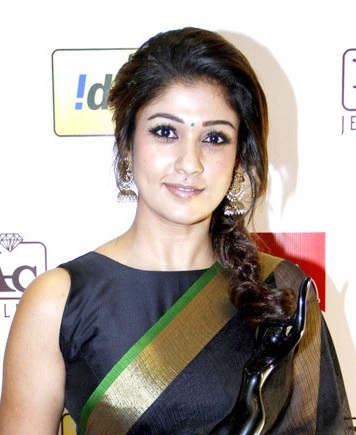
Nayanthara at Filmfare Awards

Nayanthara's first release in 2006 was Kalvanin Kadhali. Indiaglitz.com stated her performance was the "strength of the film". She next made her debut in Telugu, starring in the film Lakshmi, following which she performed in Boss, I Love You. Three Tamil films in which she enacted the lead female characters – Vallavan, Thalaimagan and E – were released simultaneously during Deepavali 2006. All three films opened to mixed reviews. In Vallavan, she portrayed a lecturer who falls in love with a student younger than her. Sify wrote: "Nayanthara virtually walks away with the film and has never looked so beautiful. She looks gorgeous especially in songs and does justice to her well-etched out role". The science fiction thriller E featured Nayanthara in the role of a bar dancer. Reviewers from Rediff stated that she made an impact. Indiaglitz said she was "very adequate and impressive in a slightly complicated role", and that she had "come up with a good performance". In Thalaimagan, she played a news reporter, with critics agreeing that she did not have much to do in the film.

=== Public recognition and widespread success (2007–2013) ===
Nayanthara regained her status in Tamil cinema by starring in the Vishnuvardhan-directed gangster film Billa (2007). A remake of the 1980 Tamil film of the same name, it went on to become a success at the box office, with Nayanthara receiving critical and popular acclaim for her performance as Sasha in her new glamorous look. Sify heaped praise on her, describing her as a "show-stopper". The reviewer further wrote: "Nayanthara has gone full throttle to look her sexiest best [...] She has a beautiful body which she flaunts daringly [...] and is also able to bring out the cold aloofness and bitterness of her character. Similarly a critic from Nowrunning.com noted that she looked "great in mini-skirts, jacket, dark glasses and tall boots". Her performance in Billa earned her first nomination for the Filmfare Award for Best Actress – Tamil, in addition to winning the Vijay Award for Favourite Heroine. The same year, she also starred in the Telugu action drama Tulasi alongside Venkatesh, which proved to be a commercial success and her performance earned her first nomination for the Filmfare Award for Best Actress – Telugu.

In 2008, she had five releases, four of which were in Tamil. Her first release was the family entertainer Yaaradi Nee Mohini. Behindwoods.com wrote: "Nayanthara dispels her bombshell act and proves that she can more than just that. She breaks into tears when needed, shows vicious contempt when rubbed the wrong way in the name of love, and looks endearing in songs". Nowrunning.com stated that she "exhibits her acting skills in full measure [and] gives a moving performance in emotional scenes", while Sify's critic wrote that she looked "sensational and has done a great job in perhaps the meatiest role she has done so far".

Her subsequent appearances were in Kuselan, Satyam and Aegan in 2008. In 2009 she appeared in Villu and Aadhavan.

In 2010, all her releases, which featured her as the female lead, turned out to be commercial successes: she had five box office hits in the four Southern languages – Adhurs (Telugu), Body Guard (Malayalam), Simha (Telugu), Boss Engira Bhaskaran (Tamil) and Super (Kannada). She won the Asianet Award for Best Actress for her performance in Body Guard. The latter three, in particular, were particularly notable for Nayanthara, with Simha becoming one of the highest-grossing Telugu films of the year and Boss Engira Bhaskaran releasing to positive reviews and becoming a financial success. Upendra's Super, which marked her debut into the Kannada film industry, opened to rave reviews, while her performance was also praised by critics. She also starred in Shyamaprasad's critically acclaimed Malayalam film Elektra. Her performance was well appreciated by critics when it was screened at the International Film Festival of India. The film was also screened at the Dubai International Film Festival.

Her only release in 2011 was the mythological film Sri Rama Rajyam (2011) by Bapu, in which she played the role of Sita. She received high critical acclaim for her performance in the film, with Rediff.com noting, "Nayanthara is the surprise package of the film. As Sita, she too has played the role of her lifetime. She gave a fine understated performance conveying a kaleidoscope of emotions." Sify commented "Nayanthara gave a fitting answer to all, unleashing grace and accomplishing the assignment with absolute perfection." Subsequently, she was awarded her first Filmfare Award – Telugu and Nandi Award for her performance. The film was dubbed in the media as her swan song and considered to be her last release before her marriage as she was reported to quit acting thereafter.

Choosing to make a comeback, Nayanthara began shooting for Krish's Krishnam Vande Jagadgurum (2012) after an eleven-month sabbatical. She portrayed the role of a journalist and her performance was praised, with a reviewer from Sify stating that "Nayanthara does not play the normal commercial glam-doll for a change and she is good" and "her chemistry with Rana is perfect". This is the only Telugu film where Nayanthara has dubbed for her character. She received her fourth nomination for the Filmfare Award for Best Actress – Telugu for her performance in the film. The following year, she won widespread critical acclaim for her performance in Atlee's romantic comedy-drama Raja Rani (2013), winning her first Filmfare Award for Best Actress – Tamil and the Vijay Award for Best Actress. Playing the role of a wife in an unhappy marriage, a critic from Sify.com noted, "Nayanthara gets a well-written role and she couldn't ask for a better character than Regina for her return after a three-year hiatus... she looks good, throws herself into the role, approaches her part with restraint and minimalist fuss, and turns in a sincere performance." Sify.com also said her role was "unquestionably the film's biggest strength". Likewise, another reviewer from Behindwoods.com stated the role was "Nayanthara's career best performance till date" and it was a "great comeback by the actress with a role which gave her ample scope".

Her next release, Vishnuvardhan's Arrambam (2013), featuring Ajith Kumar in the lead, also won acclaim with a reviewer from Rediff stating that "Nayanthara looks gorgeous and does full justice to her character", while Behindwoods critic stated that "Nayanthara puts out a fiery face when required and also showcase her oomph and style in many scenes, adding "this superstar continues to shine".

=== Stardom and further expansion (2014–2022) ===
While Anaamika did middling business, her next female-centric project, the horror film Maya (2015), emerged as a profitable venture commercially. Portraying a single mother with a mysterious past, Nayanthara won acclaim for her performance and her decision to portray an unconventional character, with Sify.com saying, "Nayanthara is just fabulous and her classier side has been perfectly unleashed in Maya... it's a treat to watch Nayanthara re-inventing herself by performing in an author backed Role".

Along with strong character roles, Nayanthara continued to appear in action and comedy films, including the successful Bhaskar the Rascal (2015) and Thani Oruvan (2015), during the same period. She then went on to win her second Filmfare Award for her role of a deaf girl seeking revenge in Vignesh Shivan's black comedy Naanum Rowdy Dhaan (2015). About her performance, Sify.com's reviewer noted "Nayanthara's Kadambari is a well-etched out role, the actress is effortlessly charming and she does full justice", and "infuses the part with the right portions of vulnerability, restraint, and quiet strength, delivering a performance that is nothing short of perfect". A video clip from the film Naanum Rowdy Dhaan went viral on social media where Nayanthara was seen buying liquor from a shop. The Hindu Makkal Katchi demanded the scene to be removed and garlanded her picture with beer bottles and even after she made a statement that it was a film scene, the Hindu Munnani burned her effigy in protest. Despite controversy, she earned her second Filmfare Award for Best Actress – Tamil for her performance in the film.

In her first release of 2016, Nayanthara portrayed a rape victim in Puthiya Niyamam (2016) opposite Mammootty, with a critic from the IBTimes stating "Nayantara's portrayal as Vasuki Iyer is one of her career-best roles till date and her decision to dub in her own voice for her character is worthy of appreciation". She earned her first Filmfare Award for Best Actress – Malayalam for her performance in the film. She continued to play diverse roles, appearing as a village-based school teacher in Thirunaal (2016), a spy in the commercially successful Vikram-starrer Iru Mugan (2016) and the queen of a fantasy kingdom in Kaashmora (2016). Her performance in the former fetched her a sixth nomination for the Filmfare Award for Best Actress – Tamil.

In 2017, she played the main lead in the horror thriller Dora and the critically acclaimed social drama Aramm. Her portrayal of a district collector in Aramm won her a third Filmfare Award for Best Actress – Tamil and second Tamil Nadu State Film Award for Best Actress. She also played the female lead in the action thriller Velaikkaran. Her first release in 2018 was a Telugu-language film Jai Simha in which she played the female lead. She went on to portray the main lead in Nelson Dilipkumar's directorial Kolamaavu Kokila and the thriller Imaikkaa Nodigal alongside actor Atharvaa. Both emerged huge successes and the latter attained highest opening weekend for a female led film in Tamil. Her performance in Kolamaavu Kokila fetched her an eighth nomination for the Filmfare Award for Best Actress – Tamil.

In 2019, she played lead roles in Viswasam, Airaa, Kolaiyuthir Kaalam and Bigil, the latter in which she collaborated with Vijay for the third time. She also appeared in the Malayalam film Love Action Drama, alongside Nivin Pauly where she attained an equal pay as that of male lead; for the first ever time in Malayalam cinema. She was also seen in Telugu biographical film, Sye Raa Narasimha Reddy, alongside Chiranjeevi and Tamannaah. In 2020, she was seen in a supporting role in Darbar along with Rajinikanth. Her film Mookuthi Amman marked her second entry into Hindu mythological and devotional cinema after her portrayal of Goddess Sita in 2011.

2021 saw her fifth collaboration with Rajinikanth with the film Annaatthe where she was seen as a lawyer. She starred in Netrikann, a remake of the 2011 South Korean film Blind. She received critical acclaim for her portrayal of blind Durga CBI in the film. She also starred in the Malayalam film Nizhal and the much delayed Telugu film Aaradugula Bullet.

Her first release of 2022 was the romantic comedy drama Kaathuvaakula Rendu Kaadhal, where she was seen alongside Vijay Sethupathi and Samantha Ruth Prabhu. She later starred in G.S. Viknesh's survival-thriller O2, where she played a single mother trying to shield her son suffering from cystic fibrosis from the effects of low oxygen. She was later seen in the Malayalam film Gold, alongside Prithviraj Sukumaran, in the Telugu film Godfather, the Tamil horror film Connect.

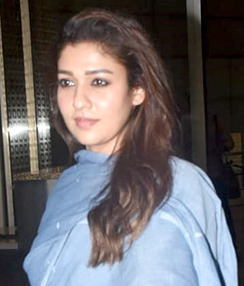
Nayanthara in 2023

=== Expansion to Hindi films and recent work (2023–present) ===
Nayanthara marked her Hindi film debut with the action thriller film Jawan opposite Shah Rukh Khan, playing a NSG officer. Her performance received acclaim but her chemistry with Khan was criticised. Monika Rawal Kukreja noted, "Nayanthara brings freshness and is greeted with a slo-mo shot each time she comes on screen." Taran Adarsh stated "Nayanthara looks stunning and delivers a first-rate performance. The chemistry between her and Khan, however, is not as electrifying as intended." The film became one of the highest-grossing Indian film.

Her second film in 2023 was the Tamil film Iraivan; for which she got a remuneration of Rs 10 Crore, making her the only South Indian actress to get a double-digit crore remuneration. She then played a chef in Annapoorani: The Goddess of Food, alongside Jai for the second time after Raja Rani. The film received mixed reviews, but Akchayaa Rajkumar of The News Minute called her the "soul of the film". Annapoorani generated controversy upon its release on Netflix. The accusations included claims of inciting love jihad and offending the sentiments of the Hindu community, specifically the inclusion of non-vegetarian food in an orthodox Brahmin community, who are strictly vegetarians. Activist Ramesh Solanki and the Hindutva group Vishva Hindu Parishad filed a police complaint. Subsequently, the movie was removed from Netflix and Nayanthara issued an apology on Instagram for unintentionally causing hurt to Hindu sentiments in her film.

In 2025, Nayanthara starred in Test, playing a school teacher desperate for a child opposite R. Madhavan and Siddharth. The film achieved high viewership on Netflix. In 2026, she appeared in Mana Shankara Vara Prasad Garu. Nayanthara will next appear in Toxic: A Fairy Tale for Grown-Ups alongside Yash, Mookuthi Amman 2, Mannangatti Since 1960, and in Dear Students alongside Nivin Pauly.

== Personal life ==
In 2006, she was in a relationship with Silambarasan. They broke up by the time Vallavan released.

In 2010, Prabhu Deva's wife, Ramlath, filed a petition in family court to prevent him from being in a live-in relationship with Nayanthara and requested reconciliation. The situation led to protests from women's organizations. In 2012, Nayanthara confirmed that she had ended her relationship with Prabhu Deva.

Nayanthara and director Vignesh Shivan have been in a relationship ever since they worked together on Naanum Rowdy Dhaan in 2015. The couple married on 9 June 2022 in Mahabalipuram in a private ceremony attended by family members, friends and co-stars that the couple worked with.

In October 2022, the couple announced the birth of their twin children via surrogacy.

On 16 November 2024, actress Nayanthara penned a letter and published a cryptic Instagram post addressing Dhanush, where Nayanthara accused Dhanush of intentionally holding onto personal grudges and vengeance over the romantic relationship that unfolded between her and Vignesh Shivan during the shooting of Naanum Rowdy Dhaan, a film which was produced by Dhanush himself. Nayanthara insisted that Dhanush had sent her a legal notice asking for a compensation of 10 crores for a 3-second video that was used in the Netflix documentary film Nayanthara: Beyond the Fairytale which were deemed as the behind-the-scenes recordings from the movie sets of Naanum Rowdy Dhaan. Nayanthara in her letter revealed that she apparently waited for nearly two years to claim the copyrighted material under the policy of a no objection certificate from her producer Dhanush in order to freely use it for her documentary. She revealed that the filmmakers had apparently re-edited and trimmed the documentary while removing the 3-second video sequence which had been shot from the shooting spots of Naanum Rowdy Dhaan as Dhanush did not grant permission for the usage of songs or visual cuts which featured in Naanum Rowdy Dhaan.

== Off-screen work ==
Nayanthara is a humanitarian and lends support to several social causes. She donated a sum of Rs. 5 lakhs to the Chief Minister's Relief Fund during the 2012 cyclonic storm Thane, in Tamil Nadu. During the COVID-19 pandemic, she donated Rs 20 lakh to Film Employees Federation of South India to help daily wagers. Apart from these she has been involved in various charitable activities. She is also a pro-Indian culture enthusiast and had participated in the 2017 pro-jallikattu protests in Chennai along with her husband Vignesh Shivan.

In 2021, Nayanthara, along with renowned dermatologist Dr Renita Rajan, launched The Lip Balm Company, a gender-neutral lip care company. She has ventured into the skincare range with her brand named 9Skin and launched a female hygiene brand called Femi9. In addition to this, she has endorsed brands and products including Tanishq, Seafood brand Fipola and GRT Jewellers. She has also done photoshoots and interviews with Vogue and Elle.

=== Rowdy Pictures ===
In 2021, Nayanthara and Vignesh Shivan launched their film production venture Rowdy Pictures, which has produced the films Koozhangal (2021), which received numerous accolades, Netrikann (2021) and Kaathuvaakula Rendu Kaadhal (2022).

== Media image and artistry ==
Nayanthara is considered among the most popular actor of Tamil, Telugu and Malayalam cinema. She is considered as one of the highest paid actresses in South Indian cinema, according to various media reports. In March 2022, according to a report by The Times of India, Nayanthara is the highest-paid South Indian actress.

Nayanthara became the only South Indian actress to be featured in the Forbes India "Celebrity 100" list of 2018, with her total annual earning credited at ₹15.17 crore. In Rediff.com's "Top 5 Tamil Actresses" list, she ranked 5th in 2013 and 1st in 2016. In "Top Telugu Actresses" list of 2007, she was placed 2nd. In the "Top 5 Malayalam Actresses" list of 2016, she ranked 4th. Nayanthara ranked 2nd in "Hottest Tamil Actresses" list. Femina included Nayanthara in its "Femina Fab 40" list of 2021 and said that she is "hands-down the Lady Superstar". Nayanthara became Chennai Times most desirable woman in 2015 and 2016. In 2023, Nayanthara opened her Instagram account, and broke Katrina Kaif's record to become the fastest female actor to reach a million followers. In 2024, she was placed in the "35 most influential young Indians" list by GQ.

Nayanthara is credited for a change in Tamil industry, for her performances in women-centric films such as Maya, Aramm, Kolamavu Kokila and Netrikann. She is also praised for her performances in films like Sri Rama Rajyam, Raja Rani, Puthiya Niyamam, Sye Raa Narasimha Reddy, Bigil.

Divya J Shekar of Forbes India noted, "What sets Nayanthara apart from most male stars is her presence and popularity across all the five South Indian states." Saradha U of The News Minute credit her "unique filmography" – a blend of commercial and content-driven films, as a reason of her success. Kayalvizhi Arivalan of Femina said that Nayanthara made women-centric films "the new norm". India Today's Janani K finds her to be "capable of pulling in the crowd even without a male star in the film". Nandini Ramnath of Vogue stated that Nayanthara is "southern cinema's brightest stars". She received the Kalaimamani award, for her "Contribution in Tamil Cinema", in 2010. The Hindu referred her as one of the Superstar women in Indian Cinema.

== In popular culture ==
- In 2021, a television series named Lady Superstar Nayanthara, was telecast on Star Vijay. The host conversed with Nayanthara, about her personal and professional life and provided a chance to her fans to interact with her.
- Netflix has documented her journey in Indian cinema in Nayanthara: Beyond the Fairytale, which was released in 2024. The documentary focuses on Nayanthara's work in the film industry and her relationship with Vignesh Shivan.

== Filmography ==
The actress Nayanthara has had an acting career spanning two decades, appearing in more than 75 films across Tamil, Telugu, Malayalam, Kannada and Hindi languages.

== Accolades ==
Nayanthara has won five Filmfare Awards South. She won one Best Actress Telugu for Sri Rama Rajyam (2011), three Best Actress Tamil for – Raja Rani (2013), Naanum Rowdy Dhaan (2015), and Aramm (2018) and one Best Actress Malayalam for Puthiya Niyamam (2016).
