= Maya (2015 Tamil film) =

2015 Indian film by Ashwin Saravanan

- Theatrical release poster
- Directed by: Ashwin Saravanan
- Written by: Ashwin Saravanan
- Produced by: S. R. Prakashbabu; S. R. Prabhu; Prabhu Venkatachalam; Gopinath P.; Thanga Prabaharan R.
- Starring: Nayanthara; Aari Arujunan
- Cinematography: Sathyan Sooryan
- Edited by: T. S. Suresh
- Music by: Ron Ethan Yohann
- Production company: Potential Studios
- Distributed by: Sri Thenandal Films; C. Kalyan (Telugu)
- Release date: 17 September 2015
- Running time: 142 minutes
- Country: India
- Language: Tamil

Maya is a 2015 Indian Tamil-language neo-noir horror film written and directed by Ashwin Saravanan and produced by Potential Studios. The film features Nayanthara in her 50th film along with Aari Arujunan in the lead roles, while Lakshmi Priya and Amzath Khan play supporting roles. The music was composed by Ron Ethan Yohann with cinematography by Sathyan Sooryan and editing by T. S. Suresh.

Maya was released on 17 September 2015. It has since been regarded as one of the best horror films of Tamil cinema. The film was remade in Kannada as Aake.

== Plot ==
Vasanth is an artist who is working on a story about 'Mayavanam', a haunted forest. On his friend's birthday, he tells a story involving 'Maya', a malevolent spirit. He tells him about how one experiences chills and witnesses a spirit descending on them when one says "Maya! Your daughter is not with me!" three times. To mock Vasanth, the friend says the same three times, and a similar figure enters the room. He falls back in fear, but the figure reveals itself as his wife; it's just a birthday surprise.

The next day, Vasanth shows the pictures taken by him during the dressed up Maya's entry to his boss, Ram Prasad and Madan, the episode writer on Mayavanam. Ram points out a smoky form near them and warns him of it. He tells him about a book, Asylum by Kate, that details the life of the mentally ill who were forced into asylums and experimented upon. Madhan then recounts the story of one such inmate, a woman named Maya Matthews, who was taken to the asylum after murdering her husband and forced to give up her newborn daughter to the authorities in the asylum. She falls to her death from the building, with an expensive ring rumoured to be on her body, and is buried in the grounds of the asylum (Mayavanam), where it is believed her vengeful spirit now roams. Later, Madhan and Vasanth's friend—an auto driver—visits Mayavanam to write about his last episode. Madhan disappears, and after escaping from Mayavanam somehow, Vasanth's friend meets with a grisly death soon, by falling off the building just like Maya, which spurs Vasanth to embark on an investigation into Mayavanam.

In alternating scenes, Apsara is a single mother struggling to make ends meet by working in ad films. She is separated from her husband Arjun who is an actor and lives with her friend Swathi who works at a film production house, RK Studios. After a poster of the film, Irul, that Swathi is currently working on is put on the walls of the house, Apsara experiences strange things happening inside the house. She doesn't give much thought to it because she is always preoccupied with the loan that she has taken from a local gangster. He keeps visiting her house demanding cash and she keeps putting it off by saying that the cheque she has been entitled to, after acting in another ad film previously, keeps bouncing off. In frustration, she goes to visit the ad company where she learns that the producer has gone to take part in the contest arranged by Swathi's company. The contest is a promotional ad for Irul, in which contestants are awarded ₹5 lakh if they succeed in watching the horror film alone at night without showing signs of fright. She catches an auto and goes to the studio. The scenes are alternated with Vasanth going to Mayavanam and the ad film producer watching the film. By the time she reaches the studio, the producer is dead and is taken on a stretcher towards the ambulance. The director of Irul had witnessed the bizarre death of the ad film producer while watching the film but claimed to the police it was a heart attack.

All lost and her being emotionally tortured by the moneylender, Apsara decides to watch Irul, to make ends meet. Swathi begs her not to, fearing for Apsara's life and in hope of the director backing her up, she appeals to him too, but the director supports Apsara even though he knows what could happen later on. The film starts to play, and it is revealed that Vasanth's side of the story is the film Irul. As Apsara continues to watch, she is inexplicably teleported into the film. Ram and Kate, the author, is shown to make a man dig into the grounds of Mayavanam, searching for the expensive ring that Maya was said that died with. Vasanth gets caught by Kate and is held at gunpoint while they search for the ring. Apsara gets caught too, and when they eventually find Maya's coffin, a figure is seen to appear behind Kate and Ram, and all hell breaks loose. Soon Apsara and Vasanth get separated from the group and are chased by the ghost. They fall into a big ditch and Vasanth helps her out, while he stays in. She runs away and hears a baby's cry. She goes in search of it when she gets shot by Shankar. After falling, she is held by Maya who cries out in bitter rage and kills Shankar. It is then revealed that Maya is Apsara's mother. She wakes up in the theatre, with her mother's diary on her lap, and the doll, which Maya had brought for her baby. It is later revealed that the person who played Vasanth in the film is Arjun himself. The producer of the ad film who died earlier, was the one who sent Maya to the asylum and took her ring.

The final scene shows Apsara reunited with her husband and now acting in a film about Maya directed by the same director as Irul. As the shooting starts, the first scene being Maya sitting in a wheelchair, Arjun finds Apsara standing in a corner while everyone was assuming that she was the one sitting in the wheelchair. The film ends with the spirit of Maya killing the director and Maya's ring falling out of his pocket. After that, Maya turns back and the screen cuts black.

== Cast ==
- Nayanthara as Apsara Arjun / Maya Mathews
- Aari Arujunan as Arjun / Vasanth
- Mime Gopi as Radhakrishnan (RK)
- Amzath Khan as Ram
- Lakshmi Priya as Swathi
- Reshmi Menon as Anjali
- G. M. Kumar as Arunachalam
- Robo Shankar as Shankar
- Uday Mahesh as Madhan
- Sharath as Kamal
- Anais Florquin as Kate
- Vanitha
- Baby Ashara
- DVD Bala
- Rajasekhar B.
- Shoban

== Production ==
Despite a modest budget, the producers insisted that a leading heroine should play the protagonist, and signed Nayanthara in the role. Aari Arujunan was selected to play the male lead after the makers were impressed with his performance in Nedunchaalai (2014). The filming began in June 2014, and schedules were canned continuously in Chennai, Tamil Nadu. The film finished shooting in October 2014, and the makers announced that the release would be in late 2015.

== Soundtrack ==
Maya

Soundtrack album by Ron Ethan Yohann
- Released: 13 July 2015
- Genre: Feature film soundtrack
- Length: 23:06
- Language: Tamil
- Label: Divo
- Producer: Ron Ethan Yohann

Ron Ethan Yohann chronology
Sooriya Nagaram (2012)	Maya (2015)	Sigai (2019)

Maya's soundtrack was composed by Ron Ethan Yohann, who earlier made his music composing debut in Sooriya Nagaram under his original name Fen Viallee. The soundtrack album was launched at RadioCity on 13 July 2015.

Track listing
No.	Title	Lyrics	Singer(s)	Length
1.	"Aayiram Aayiram"	Kutti Revathi	Chinmayi	4:56
2.	"Naane Varuvaen"	Uma Devi	Shweta Mohan	4:54
3.	"Thoonga Kangal"	Kutti Revathi	Shakthisree Gopalan	4:21
4.	"Always A Woman"		Instrumental	3:44
5.	"Dark Hours"		Instrumental	5:11
6.	"Hope & Despair"		Instrumental
Total length:				23:06

== Release ==
The film was released worldwide on 17 September 2015, simultaneously as Maya in Tamil and Mayuri in Telugu.

== Reception ==
The Times of India gave the film 3.5 stars out of 5 and wrote: "Maya is wholly original and cerebral as well. Even after the film has ended, we keep thinking about it, replaying the scenes in our mind and thinking about the inventiveness in how the plot lines are brought together. And that is its real success". Sify wrote: "Maya is a stupendous film and the entire team has done a remarkable job on par with international standards", going on to call it "undoubtedly one of the best horror movies of Tamil cinema".

Daily News and Analysis gave 3.5 out of 5 and wrote: "Maya is more atmospheric and it’s the performances by the lead actors that really lend to the film more than the actual ghost. In Maya, you find a de-glam Nayanthara who has essayed her role brilliantly". The New Indian Express wrote: "Slickly crafted and engagingly narrated, debutant Ashwin Saravanan's Maya is built around some eerie happenings around a mental asylum...A pure horror flick, the film is devoid of any comedy elements. The director has managed to maintain suspense from the beginning to the end".

=== Awards ===
- Best Lead Role Female Award at IIFA Utsavam Awards 2015
- Best Actress Award by IBNLive Movie Awards 2015
- K. Balachander Award for Best Female Actor at Chennai International Film Festival 2016
