= R. Madhavan filmography =

List of films of Indian actor Ranganathan Madhavan

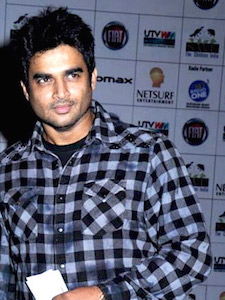
R. Madhavan in 2011

R. Madhavan is an Indian actor known for his work predominantly in Tamil and Hindi films, along with a few films in Telugu, English, Malayalam and Kannada languages. He began his acting career in the early 1990s by featuring in Hindi soap operas like Banegi Apni Baat, Sea Hawks, Ghar Jamai and Saaya. In 2000, Madhavan gained recognition in Tamil cinema by playing the lead role in Mani Ratnam's romantic drama film Alaipayuthey. He followed this with appearances in two commercially successful Tamil films, Gautham Vasudev Menon's directorial debut Minnale (2001) and Madras Talkies' Dumm Dumm Dumm (2001), as well as his first Hindi film in a leading role, Rehnaa Hai Terre Dil Mein (2001).

In the early 2000s, Madhavan worked on Tamil films including Kannathil Muthamittal (2002), Run (2002), Anbe Sivam (2003) and Aaytha Ezhuthu (2004). Madhavan also simultaneously pursued a career in the Hindi film industry, by appearing in supporting roles in films including Rakeysh Omprakash Mehra's Rang De Basanti (2006), Mani Ratnam's biopic Guru (2007) and Rajkumar Hirani's 3 Idiots (2009), which became the highest-grossing Indian film of all time upon release at the time. Other Tamil productions that Madhavan worked on during the late 2000s included Evano Oruvan (2007), which he also produced, and the horror film Yavarum Nalam (2009).

After appearing in Tanu Weds Manu (2011) and Vettai (2012), Madhavan took an extended break from signing new film projects. His comeback films, the romantic-comedy Tanu Weds Manu Returns (2015), the bilingual sports drama Irudhi Suttru (2016) and the crime film Vikram Vedha (2017) all performed well at the box office. His performance as a boorish boxing coach in Irudhi Suttru fetched him Best Actor awards at the Filmfare, IIFA and SIIMA award ceremonies.

== Filmography ==
Key
†	Denotes films that have not yet been released

=== Films ===
Film performances by R. Madhavan
Year	Title	Role(s)	Language(s)	Notes	Ref(s)
1996	Is Raat Ki Subah Nahin	Singer	Hindi	Guest appearance in the song "Chup Tum Raho"	
1997	Inferno	Ravi	English	credited as Mahadevan	
1998	Shanti Shanti Shanti	Siddhartha	Kannada		
2000	Alaipayuthey	Karthik Varadharajan	Tamil		
2000	Ennavalle	James Vasanth	Tamil		
2001	Minnale	Rajesh Shivakumar	Tamil		
2001	Dumm Dumm Dumm	Aditya	Tamil		
2001	Rehnaa Hai Terre Dil Mein	Madhav Shastri	Hindi		
2001	Paarthale Paravasam	Madhava	Tamil		
2002	Kannathil Muthamittal	Thiruchelvan	Tamil		
2002	Run	Siva	Tamil		
2002	Dil Vil Pyar Vyar	Krish Kumar	Hindi		
2003	Anbe Sivam	Anbarasu	Tamil		
2003	Lesa Lesa	Deva Narayanan	Tamil	Cameo appearance	
2003	Nala Damayanthi	Ramji Narayanaswami Iyer	Tamil		
2003	Priyamaana Thozhi	Ashok	Tamil		
2003	Jay Jay	Jagan	Tamil		
2004	Aethirree	Subramani	Tamil		
2004	Aaytha Ezhuthu	Inbasekar	Tamil		
2004	Nothing But Life	Thomas Roberts	English	Bilingual film	
2004	Made In USA	Thomas Roberts	Malayalam	Bilingual film	
2005	Priyasakhi	Sandhana Krishnan	Tamil		
2005	Ramji Londonwaley	Ramnarayan Tiwari	Hindi		
2006	Rang De Basanti	Ajay Singh Rathod	Hindi	Guest appearance	
2006	Thambi	Thambi Velu Thondaiman	Tamil		
2006	Rendu	Sakthi, Kannan (Note: Madhavan played dual roles in this film.)	Tamil	Dual role	
2007	Guru	Shyam Saxena	Hindi		
2007	That Four-Letter Word	Himself	English	Guest appearance	
2007	Delhii Heights	Himself	Hindi	Guest appearance	
2007	Aarya	Aarya	Tamil		
2007	Evano Oruvan	Sridhar Vasudevan	Tamil		
2008	Halla Bol	Himself	Hindi	Guest appearance	
2008	Vaazhthugal	T. Kadhiravan	Tamil		
2008	Mumbai Meri Jaan	Nikhil Agarwal	Hindi		
2008	Tipu Kanan Tipu Kiri	Himself	Malay	Guest appearance	
2009	13B	R. Manohar	Hindi	Bilingual film	
2009	Yavarum Nalam	R. Manohar	Tamil	Bilingual film	
2009	Guru En Aalu	Guru	Tamil		
2009	Sikandar	Rajesh Rao	Hindi		
2009	3 Idiots	Farhan Qureshi	Hindi		
2010	Om Shanti	Maddy	Telugu	Cameo appearance	
2010	Teen Patti	Shantanu Biswas	Hindi		
2010	Jhootha Hi Sahi	Kabir	Hindi	Cameo appearance	
2010	Manmadan Ambu	Madhanagopal (Madhan)	Tamil		
2011	Tanu Weds Manu	Manoj Kumar Sharma (Manu)	Hindi		
2012	Vettai	Inspector Thirumurthy	Tamil		
2012	Jodi Breakers	Siddharth Khanna	Hindi		
2013	Taak Jhaank	Sanjay	Hindi		
2014	Akeli	Avinash	Hindi		
2015	Tanu Weds Manu: Returns	Manoj Kumar Sharma (Manu)	Hindi		
2015	Night of the Living Dead: Darkest Dawn	Tom	English	Voiceover	
2016	Irudhi Suttru	Prabhu Selvaraj	Tamil	Bilingual film	
2016	Saala Khadoos	Aditya Tomar (Adi)	Hindi	Bilingual film	
2017	Vikram Vedha	Inspector Vikram	Tamil		
2017	Magalir Mattum	Surendhar Silkurayappan	Tamil	Cameo appearance	
2018	Savyasachi	Arun Raj Varma	Telugu		
2018	Zero	Kartik Srinivasan	Hindi		
2020	Nishabdham	Anthony Gonsalves	Telugu	Bilingual film (Note: Although the film was made in both languages, he only shot his portions in Tamil.)	
2020	Silence	Anthony Gonsalves	Tamil	Bilingual film	
2021	Maara	Manimaaran (Maara)	Tamil		
2022	Meri Awas Suno	Major	Malayalam	Voiceover	
2022	Rocketry: The Nambi Effect	Nambi Narayanan	English	Trilingual film	
2022	Rocketry: The Nambi Effect	Nambi Narayanan	Tamil	Trilingual film	
2022	Rocketry: The Nambi Effect	Nambi Narayanan	Hindi	Trilingual film	
2022	Dhokha: Round D Corner	Yathaarth Sinha	Hindi		
2024	Shaitaan	Vanraj Kashyap	Hindi		
2025	Hisaab Barabar	Radhe Mohan Sharma	Hindi		
2025	Test	Saravanan	Tamil		
2025	Kesari Chapter 2	Neville McKinley	Hindi		
2025	Maa	Vanraj Kashyap	Hindi	Cameo appearance	
2025	Aap Jaisa Koi	Shrirenu Tripathi	Hindi		
2025	De De Pyaar De 2	Rakesh "Rajji" Khurana	Hindi		
2025	Dhurandhar	IB Chief Ajay Sanyal	Hindi		
2026	Dhurandhar: The Revenge	IB Chief Ajay Sanyal	Hindi		
2026	G.D.N	G. D. Naidu	Tamil	Also co-screenplay writer and producer	
2026	Adhirshtasaali †	TBA	Tamil	Completed	
2026	Circle †	TBA	Tamil	Bilingual film; completed	
2026	Circle †	TBA	Hindi	Bilingual film; completed	

=== Other crew positions ===
Year	Film	Position	Language	Notes	Ref(s)
2005	Ramji Londonwaley	Screenwriter	Hindi		
2007	Evano Oruvan	Producer, dialogue writer	Tamil		
2016	Saala Khadoos	Producer	Hindi		
2020	Putham Pudhu Kaalai	Narrator	Tamil	Voiceover in Ilamai Idho Idho segment	
2020	Soorarai Pottru	Narrator	Tamil	Voiceover in credits	
2022	Rocketry: The Nambi Effect	Director, producer, screenwriter	Tamil; Hindi; English	Trilingual film	
2024	Sarfira	Narrator	Hindi	Voiceover in credits	
2024	ARM	Narrator in Hindi Version	Hindi	Voiceover in credits	

== Television ==
Year	Title	Role	Language	Notes	Ref(s)
1993	Yule Love Story	Crook	Hindi		
1993 – 1997	Banegi Apni Baat	Ashley Alexander	Hindi		
1995	A Mouthful of Sky	N/A	English		
1995	Suhana Safar	N/A	Hindi		
1995	Yeh Kahan Aa Gaye Hum	Raj Parmar	Hindi		
1995	Badalte Rishtey	Abhilash Verma	Hindi		
1995 – 1996	Aarohan	Shammi	Hindi		
1996	Hum Dono	Rahul	Hindi		
1996	Aahat	Raj	Hindi		
1997	Raj Kahani	Aditya / Mungi (Note: Madhavan played dual roles in this series.)	Hindi		
1997 – 1998	Ghar Jamai	Subodh	Hindi		
1997 – 1998	Sea Hawks	Preet	Hindi		
1997	Kabhie Kabhie	N/A	Hindi		
1997	Tol Mol Ke Bol	Host	Hindi		
1998	Saaya	Shekhar	Hindi		
2000	Rishtey	Sameer	Hindi	Segment: Kashish	
2005 – 2006	Deal Ya No Deal	Host	Hindi		
2009	CID	Himself	Hindi	Guest appearance	
2010	Big Money	Host	Hindi		
2018	The Final Table	Judge	English	Episode 5	
2018	Breathe	Denzel Mascarenhas (Danny)	Hindi	Mini series	
2021	Decoupled	Arya Iyer	Hindi		
2023	The Railway Men	Rati Pandey	Hindi	Mini series	

== Documentaries ==
Film	Year	Role	Language	Ref(s)
2008	Herova? Zerova?	Himself	Tamil	
2011	Big In Bollywood	Himself	English	
2018	Mega Icons	Host	English	
2021	India's Space Odyssey	Narrator	Hindi	

== Bibliography ==
- Rangan, Baradwaj (2012). Conversations with Mani Ratnam. New Delhi: Penguin Books. ISBN 978-81-8475-690-6.
- Christopher, Michael (29 March 2011). "Everything Masala? Genres in Tamil Cinema". In Karpovich, A.; Chan, F.; Zhang, X. (eds.). Genre in Asian Film and Television: New Approaches. Berlin: Springer Science+Business Media. ISBN 978-0-230-30190-0.
