= R. Madhavan =

Indian actor and filmmaker (born 1970)

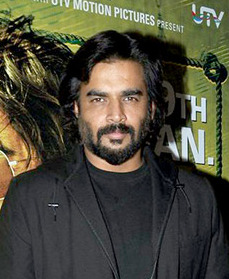
- Madhavan in 2016
- Born: Ranganathan Madhavan; 1 June 1970 (age 56); Jamshedpur, Bihar (now in Jharkhand), India
- Occupations: Actor; screenwriter; film producer; film director
- Years active: 1993–present
- Works: Full list
- Spouse: Sarita Birje (m. 1999)
- Children: Vedaant Madhavan
- Awards: Padma Shri (2026)

President of Film and Television Institute of India
- Incumbent
- Assumed office 1 September 2023
- Preceded by: Shekhar Kapur

Ranganathan Madhavan (born 1 June 1970) is an Indian actor, screenwriter, film producer, and film director who predominantly works in Tamil and Hindi cinema. Madhavan has appeared in over 70 films, he has won one National Film Award, five Filmfare Awards South, two Tamil Nadu State Film Awards, and five SIIMA Awards. He was awarded Padma Shri by Government of India in 2026 in field of Art. Since September 2023, Madhavan is the President of FTII, Pune.

Madhavan attained his first break in Tamil cinema with Mani Ratnam's romantic drama Alaipayuthey (2000) and followed it with romantic roles in Gautham Vasudev Menon's directorial debut Minnale (2001) and Madras Talkies' Dumm Dumm Dumm (2001). He had major commercial successes in Run (2002), Thambi (2006) and Rendu (2006) and gained praise for his performances in Kannathil Muthamittal (2002), Anbe Sivam (2003), Nala Damayanthi (2003) and Aayutha Ezhuthu (2004). Towards the late-2000s, Madhavan inclined to Hindi films with pivotal roles in three highly successful productions: the patriotic Rang De Basanti (2006), Mani Ratnam's biopic Guru (2007) and the comedy-drama 3 Idiots (2009), which went on to become the highest-grossing Indian film of all time at the time of its release. Simultaneously, he continued to appear in Tamil films like Evano Oruvan (2007) and Yavarum Nalam (2009).

After delivering two box-office hits with Tanu Weds Manu (2011) and Vettai (2012), Madhavan took an acting break for 3 years and bounced back in 2015. His comeback films – the romantic comedy Tanu Weds Manu Returns (2015), the bilingual sports-drama Irudhi Suttru (2016) and the crime film Vikram Vedha (2017) all became critical and commercial successes. His portrayal of a boorish boxing coach in Irudhi Suttru fetched him Best Actor awards at the Filmfare, IIFA and SIIMA ceremonies. Madhavan made his directorial debut in Rocketry: The Nambi Effect (2022), in which he played the Indian rocket scientist Nambi Narayanan, which achieved universal acclaim and honours including the National Film Award for Best Feature Film. He has since appeared in the supernatural thriller Shaitaan (2024), spy thrillers Dhurandhar (2025) and Dhurandhar: The Revenge (2026), all of which were major commercial successes with the lattermost emerging his biggest hit till date.

In addition to his acting career, Madhavan has worked as a writer on his films, hosted television programs and has been a prominent celebrity endorser for brands and products. He has also worked as a film producer, first making Evano Oruvan with Leukos Films, before setting up Tricolour Films to produce Saala Khadoos (2016). Madhavan is noted for his philanthropic activities and promotes various causes such as environment, health, and education. He is particularly vocal about the protection of animals and was awarded PETA's Person of the Year recognition in 2011. In 2021, he was conferred the honorary degree of Doctor of Letters by D. Y. Patil Education Society, Kolhapur, for his contribution to arts and cinema.

== Early life and education ==
Madhavan was born on 1 June 1970 in Jamshedpur, Bihar (now in Jharkhand), India, to a Tamil Brahmin family. His father, Ranganathan, was a management executive in Tata Steel and his mother, Saroja, was a manager in the Bank of India. His younger sister, Devika, is a software engineer. He had a Tamil-speaking upbringing in Jharkhand. Madhavan did his schooling from D.B.M.S. English School Jamshedpur.

In 1988, Madhavan gained a scholarship to represent India as a cultural ambassador from Rajaram College, Kolhapur and spent a year in Stettler, Alberta, Canada, as part of an exchange program with Rotary International. He returned to Kolhapur and completed his education, graduating with a BSc in Electronics. During his college years, Madhavan became actively involved in extra-curricular military training, and at 22, he was recognised as among the leading NCC cadets in Maharashtra, which allowed him to make a trip with seven others as NCC cadets to England. As a result of this opportunity, he received training with the British Army, the Royal Navy and the Royal Air Force, which he had, at a point, considered joining. However he missed the age cut-off by six months and was subsequently unable to join the program. After he lost out on the place, he began teaching courses on public speaking and personality development skills in Kolhapur, and the satisfaction he gained through teaching, prompted him to pursue a post-graduation in public speaking at Kishinchand Chellaram College in Mumbai. During the period, he also won the Indian Championship for Public Speaking and subsequently represented India at the Young Businessmen Conference in Tokyo, Japan in 1992. During his stint in Mumbai, he opted to create a portfolio and submit it to a modelling agency in order to gain more income to set up an office.

== Career ==
=== 1993-1998: Early career ===
Prior to his film career, Madhavan was spotted by a television executive while out walking in Lokhandwala in Mumbai, and was cast in Hindi television serials, appearing as a crook in his first venture Yule Love Story (1993). He appeared in leading roles in Zee TV's Banegi Apni Baat (1993) and Ghar Jamai, while he portrayed the character of Shekhar in Saaya. He also went on to act as Lt. Shammi in Aarohan (The Ascent), as a ship's captain in Sea Hawks, as a convict in Yeh Kahan Aa Gaye Hum and worked as a television anchor in Tol Mol Ke Bol among other television appearances. Madhavan appeared in a television series called A Mouthful of Sky in 1995, featuring in the role of an actor. He also appeared in an episode titled Virasat of the Hindi horror television show Aahat. His first appearance in a feature film role came through a small role in Is Raat Ki Subah Nahin (1996), where he portrayed a singer in a bar. In early 1996, Madhavan worked on a sandalwood talc advertisement directed by Santosh Sivan, who later recommended him to Mani Ratnam to take part in a screen test for a role in Iruvar (1997). Madhavan was auditioned for the leading role of Tamizhselvan among several other more established actors, but Mani Ratnam eventually left him out of the project citing that he thought his "eyes looked too young" for a senior role.

In 1997, Madhavan appeared in a supporting role as an Indian police officer in Fred Olen Ray's English film, Inferno, which was shot in India. His first role in Indian cinema came in the form of Shanti Shanti Shanti (1998), a Kannada film, in which he appeared as a young man alongside actor Abbas. However, the film performed poorly at the box office. During the period, Hindi film director Vinod Pandey launched Madhavan as a Bollywood hero, with a project titled Akeli, however the film was shelved before the production was completed.

=== 1999–2001: Breakthrough ===
In 1999, Indian director Mani Ratnam selected Madhavan to feature in the leading role of his Tamil romantic drama, Alaipayuthey (2000) and the film was a critical and commercial success and increased his recognition. Portraying the character of Karthik Varadharajan, a young husband experiencing difficulties with his marriage. Madhavan revealed that he studied the technical aspects of film-making from the director and learned the entire script of the film, irrespective of whether he was in the scene or not. He became the first debutant actor to be cast by Mani Ratnam in the lead role of a film, and revealed that when he found out that he was set to work with the director he was overcome with a "mixture of excitement, awe, fear and ambition". Featuring alongside actress Shalini, Madhavan's performance was well received by critics and the film's success led to it becoming a cult film. A critic from The Hindu described that Madhavan "sails through the litmus test with ease", while another review cited that Madhavan was a "promising debutant" into the film industry. His performance in the film earned him the Filmfare Award for Best Male Debut – South, in addition to his first nomination for the Filmfare Award for Best Actor – Tamil. After the success of his first Tamil film, the producers of his previous Kannada film, Shanti Shanti Shanti, dubbed the film into Tamil and released it as Relax, to capitalise on Madhavan's success. Madhavan's next film, Ennavalle (2000), received mixed reviews although Madhavan's portrayal was praised as the "mainstay" of the film, with claims that the film for him was a "merely a prosaic exercise".

Madhavan's first release of 2001, Gautham Vasudev Menon's directorial debut Minnale, opened to critical acclaim and commercial success. Featuring a popular soundtrack by Harris Jayaraj and marketed as a Valentine's Day release, Minnale further built on the actor's image as a romantic hero and was later listed as a classic romantic film from the Tamil film industry. He then collaborated with Mani Ratnam for the second time by appearing in the director's production venture, the romantic comedy Dumm Dumm Dumm (2001), alongside Jyothika. Appearing as an unhappy groom trying to halt his wedding, the film received positive reviews and emerged as a commercial success, with Madhavan establishing himself as a notable actor in South India. Madhavan then again appeared as a husband in a tumultuous marriage in Parthale Paravasam (2001), the hundredth venture of veteran director K. Balachander. Despite featuring among an ensemble cast and being widely anticipated prior to release, the film failed at the box-office, with critics citing that Madhavan looked "rather bored" with the proceedings. Similarly his first lead role in a Hindi film, Rehna Hai Tere Dil Mein (2001), a remake of his Minnale in which he reprised the same role for the remake, was also unsuccessful at the box office, with the film and Madhavan's performance receiving mixed reviews.

=== 2002–2004: Critical acclaim ===
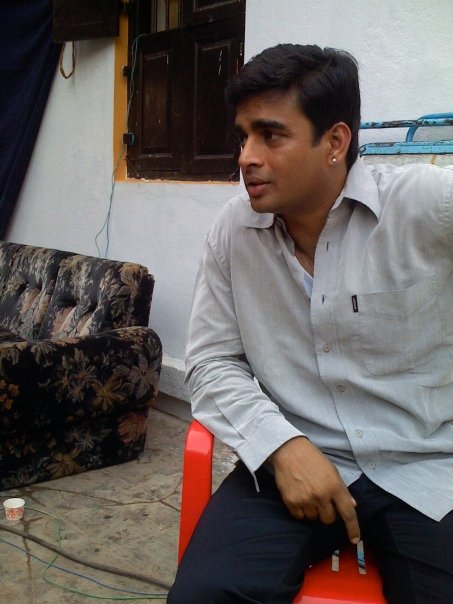
Madhavan at a film set

In 2002, Madhavan played the role of a novelist in Mani Ratnam's Kannathil Muthamittal alongside actresses Keerthana, Simran and Nandita Das. In the film, he was shown as the role of the father of an adopted child, who wishes to return to her native homeland amidst the Sri Lankan civil war. The film received widespread critical acclaim and went on to win six National Awards as well as over ten awards at various International Film Festivals. Madhavan received critical acclaim for his portrayal with a critic citing "he lived the role of the character he portrays", with the film seeing him move away from the romantic hero image for the first time into a more serious, performance-oriented role. The good performance of the film internationally also helped him develop an overseas market for his films. He earned his second nomination for the Filmfare Award for Best Actor – Tamil for his performance in the film. Madhavan's next success came with Run, a film recognised for its screenplay, with Madhavan appearing in an action film for the first time in his career. In regard to his performance, The Hindu's critic noted "he manages to portray action with élan in Run and actually looks fit and comfortable in the role", with the film helping him make a breakthrough as an action hero. Despite another unsuccessful Hindi venture with the musical, Dil Vil Pyar Vyar (2002), the success of his previous films helped him secure the Tamil Nadu State Film Award for Best Actor for 2002, being jointly recognised for both films.

Madhavan was cast alongside Kamal Haasan in Anbe Sivam (2003), which told the story of an unexpected journey from Bhubaneswar to Chennai of two men who are polar opposites of each other. Madhavan revealed his elation at working with an experienced actor like Kamal Haasan, while noting that a human drama film like Anbe Sivam was important for his career as an actor as it came after a successful masala film in Run. Portraying a young frustrated filmmaker with capitalistic beliefs who travels with a handicapped communist played by Kamal Haasan, Madhavan's performance was described as a "milestone in his career" and that "his portrayal will remain with the viewer for long" by a critic from The Hindu. The film opened in January 2003 to positive reviews, and emerged as a surprise box-office failure. Post-release, the film has garnered critical acclaim from critics and television audiences and is considered one of the "cult classics" of Tamil cinema. Film critic Baradwaj Rangan wrote that the film "was leagues ahead of the average Tamil and Indian film", though felt that "the masses were unwilling to accept the experimental nature of the film", while talking about the film's box office failure. Post-filming, Kamal Haasan revealed that he was impressed with Madhavan's enthusiasm and concentration during the making of the film and thus subsequently signed him on to appear in his production venture, Nala Damayanthi (2003), where he played a Brahmin cook lost in Australia. In 2003, the actor also appeared in Vikraman's family drama Priyamana Thozhi as a budding cricketer, Saran's romantic comedy Jay Jay and made a guest appearance in Priyadarshan's Lesa Lesa as a jailed teacher. The three films made average returns at the box office, though Madhavan's performances were appreciated by critics.

Madhavan played an imposter gangster in K. S. Ravikumar's comedy Aethiree (2004) before being selected to feature in his fourth Mani Ratnam production, Aaytha Ezhuthu (2004), which featured him in an ensemble cast including Suriya, Siddharth, Meera Jasmine, Esha Deol and Trisha. Madhavan portrayed the character of Inba Sekhar, a hitman living in the slums of Chennai, whose path crosses with the characters portrayed by Suriya and Siddharth. His role also featured him in a struggling marriage, where his wife desperately tries to claw him away from his profession. Madhavan bulked up and sported a shaven look for the first time in his career to resemble the character of a ruffian and shot for the film through the sync sound technique. He received widespread praise for his depiction, with Baradwaj Rangan of The Hindu claiming that Madhavan outplayed Abhishek Bachchan's interpretation of the character in the Hindi version of the bilingual, Yuva. Madhavan went on to win the Filmfare Award for the Best Tamil Supporting Actor, while another critic from The Hindu cited that he "sparkles as an anti-hero" and that the "character ought to find a very special place in his repertoire". Similarly, a critic from Indiaglitz.com stated "Madhavan's daring decision to play a negative character, who gets beaten up black and blue at the end, putting his 'hero' image in peril, has paid off, as he walks away with top honours", while a reviewer from Sify.com labelled him as "terrific". In late 2004, Madhavan worked on Rajiv Anchal's English-Malayalam crossover film Nothing But Life (2005) and completed his work in a single schedule across Las Vegas and Albuquerque. Portraying an orphaned youth with suicidal tendencies being treated by a Malayali psychiatrist in the US, the film and his portrayal opened to mixed reviews.

=== 2005–2008: Increased work in Hindi films ===
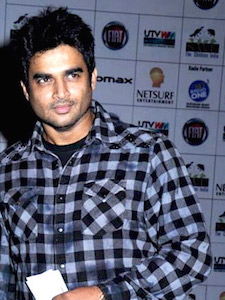
Madhavan at an event

Madhavan appeared in another marriage drama film, Priyasakhi (2005) co-starring Sadha – with the pair playing an estranged husband and wife. The film received praise for the lead pair's performances with Madhavan being praised as "top class", while it also became the first Tamil film to be dubbed into Zulu.

From 2005 onwards, Madhavan increased his work in Hindi films and starred and wrote the Hindi dialogues for the comedy Ramji Londonwaley (2005), a remake of his earlier film Nala Damayanthi. Critics described his performance as "a master-stroke", though the film fared averagely at the box office due to the release of other big budget films during the period. He experienced box office success in Hindi films for the first time through his role in Rakeysh Omprakash Mehra's Rang De Basanti (2006). Featuring in an ensemble cast led by Aamir Khan, Madhavan essayed the guest role of Ajay Singh Rathod, a flight lieutenant, whose death triggers a revolutionary movement against corruption. The film was subsequently nominated for the Best Foreign Language Film at the 2006 BAFTA Awards, while it was also chosen as India's official entry for the Golden Globe Awards and the Academy Awards for the Best Foreign Language Film category. Madhavan then collaborated with Mani Ratnam for the fifth time in the biopic Guru (2007), co-starring Abhishek Bachchan, Aishwarya Rai and Vidya Balan. His role of Shyam Saxena was inspired from the life of real-life journalist S. Gurumurthy, who was a challenger to the business tycoon, Dhirubhai Ambani, whose life drew allusions with Bachchan's role. The film became a blockbuster and also received critical acclaim, with a reviewer citing that Madhavan acts with "extreme, believable sincerity" dubbing him as "truly a poster boy for India", while another claimed he performed "a weak role with élan".

His Tamil film, Thambi (2006) directed by Seeman, had a delayed release but became a profitable venture in town and village centres. Madhavan's portrayal of a rustic do-gooder, received positive reviews from critics though a reviewer from The Hindu claimed the actor was "unable to shed off his classy looks". He then appeared in Sundar C's comedy film Rendu (2006), where he played dual roles for the first time and in the long-delayed romantic comedy Aarya (2007), appearing as a medical student. Madhavan wrote the dialogues, produced and featured in the lead role in Nishikanth Kamat's Evano Oruvan (2007), playing a middle class bank employee who becomes so disgusted with the corruption he faces in his day-to-day life that he becomes a vigilante. After setting up a production studio, Leukos Films, he helped promote the film in international film festivals before the theatrical release in December 2007. Critics called the film a "must watch" and a reviewer from The Hindu stated that the film was "Madhavan's best performance to date", while he also went on to win the ITFA Best Actor Award for his depiction. However Evano Oruvan and his subsequent release, Seeman's Vaazhthukal (2008) did not perform well at the box office, while another completed film titled Naan Aval Adhu failed to have a theatrical release. Madhavan's final release of the year was the docudrama Mumbai Meri Jaan, based upon the 2006 Mumbai Bombings. The film, which featured him alongside Soha Ali Khan, Irrfan Khan and Kay Kay Menon became critically acclaimed with Madhavan's portrayal of a man with a post-traumatic stress disorder being appreciated by reviewers.

=== 2009–2014: Further success and sabbatical ===
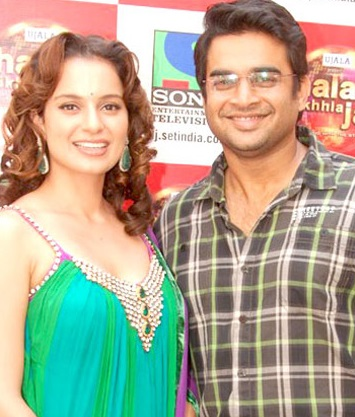
Madhavan with Kangana Ranaut promoting Tanu Weds Manu in 2010

Madhavan won positive acclaim for playing the lead role in Vikram Kumar's horror film, Yavarum Nalam (2009). The film, which became a commercial and critical success, prompted a reviewer from the Times of India to suggest "he carried the film on his shoulders" while he was also nominated in the Best Actor category at the Vijay Awards. His following two films, the romantic comedy Guru En Aalu (2009) and the action film Sikandar (2009) in which he played a supporting role of an army officer, both fetched mixed reviews. Madhavan then starred in Rajkumar Hirani's comedy film, 3 Idiots (2009), alongside Aamir Khan and Sharman Joshi. Upon release, the film received widespread critical acclaim and went on to become the highest-grossing Indian film of all time at the time of its release. Madhavan's portrayal as a young engineer with a passion for photography earned him nominations for the Filmfare Award for Best Supporting Actor and the IIFA Award for Best Supporting Actor. Film critic Taran Adarsh from Bollywood Hungama described the actor's performance as "incredible", while Madhavan claimed that the film changed how he was viewed as an actor in Hindi films for the better. He later turned down an offer of reprising the same role in the Tamil remake of the film helmed by Shankar. In 2010, Madhavan appeared alongside actors Amitabh Bachchan and Ben Kingsley in Teen Patti (2010) as a young professor, with Adarsh again rating his performance as "excellent", but the film failed at the box office. His two guest appearances in the year also received mixed feedback with his performance in the Telugu anthology film Om Shanti (2010) being praised, while a role in the John Abraham-starrer Jhootha Hi Sahi (2010) drew him criticism. Madhavan then collaborated again with Kamal Haasan and K. S. Ravikumar in the romantic comedy, Manmadan Ambu (2010), playing a wealthy businessman who hires a spy to follow his actress girlfriend on a European cruise tour. The film opened to positive reviews with Madhavan's performance being described by Rediff.com as "excellent", while Sify.com labelled him the "scene-stealer".

His only release in 2011 was the romantic comedy-drama Tanu Weds Manu alongside Kangana Ranaut, which saw him play the role of a sensible doctor hoping to get an arranged marriage with a girl, who has a dramatically diverse personality to him. Prior to release, the film's promotional campaign created anticipation and upon release, the film proved to be a major success at the box office. Madhavan's portrayal of Manoj Kumar Sharma a.k.a. Manu won positive acclaim, with a reviewer citing that his performance was "real, restrained, yet forceful" and another claiming he was "perfectly cast". Madhavan next appeared as a police officer in Linguswamy's Tamil film Vettai (2012), an action entertainer featuring an ensemble cast of Arya, Amala Paul and Sameera Reddy. The film opened to positive reviews in January 2012 and went on to become a commercial success, with critics praising Madhavan's decision to accept the role of a timid cop, while a critic noted that he had "an uncanny talent for comedy". He then featured in Jodi Breakers (2012), a Hindi romantic comedy film shot in Greece alongside Bipasha Basu, though the film did not perform well commercially.

In 2012, Madhavan took a sabbatical and was based in Chicago resting his knee, which he injured during the making of Vettai, causing him to suffer from chondromalacia patellae. During the period, he felt he had to "reinvent himself" and had to work on films which would appeal to the "new generation of audiences", so took a decision to work on a single film at a time. During a period of three years without any theatrical releases, his long-delayed Hindi film Taak Jhaank directed by Rituparno Ghosh in 2006, premièred at the 19th Kolkata International Film Festival in 2013, while his first Hindi film Akeli, shot in 1997, was released online during the following year. During his recovery period and sabbatical in 2013, Madhavan signed on to appear in Simon West's Night of the Living Dead: Darkest Dawn, in which he appeared as a former marine personnel and shot for the project in California. The animated film, where Madhavan provided voice work, premièred in San Diego during July 2015.

=== 2015–present: Comeback ===
Madhavan's first theatrical release after his sabbatical was Anand L. Rai's Tanu Weds Manu Returns, a sequel to the 2011 film, which released in May 2015. Prior to the film's release, Madhavan stated that the "content of the film was more important than the stars" and acknowledged that the popularity of Kangana Ranaut would help the film gain a good opening at the box office. Reprising his role as Manu, Madhavan won acclaim for his restrained performance and the film went on to become a critical and commercial success. The critic from Bollywood Hungama wrote "Madhavan excels in his role despite it being a restrained one, which was anyways the call of his character" and added "he is very endearing who never tries to overshadow anyone and emerges a winner", while Sify.com stated he gives a "subtle and restrained performance". Tanu Weds Manu Returns earned ₹2.43 billion (US$26 million) worldwide at the end of its theatrical run, to become one of the highest-grossing Bollywood films in 2015.

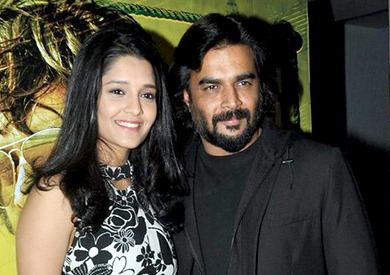
Madhavan with Ritika Singh promoting Saala Khados in 2016

During his sabbatical, Madhavan also worked extensively on the pre-production of the bilingual sports film, Irudhi Suttru (2016) directed by Sudha Kongara. After being impressed with Sudha's script, he helped find the project producers in Tamil and chose to produce the film in Hindi alongside S. Sashikanth and Rajkumar Hirani. Madhavan also met and convinced mixed martial artist Ritika Singh to act in the film after contacting her through Raj Kundra, while he was also credited for contributing as an additional screenplay writer. He also went through a body conditioning regime in Los Angeles prior to joining the film's set and learnt boxing to essay the role of a former boxer. For dubbing purposes, Madhavan wore metal braces inside his teeth, to create the effect of having a lisp that most boxers have from sporting injuries. Madhavan won praise for his work during the marketing campaign, having travelled throughout Tamil Nadu to promote the film, with The Hindu stating it was "unlike other film promotions in the South". For Irudhi Suttru, Madhavan received widespread critical acclaim for his portrayal with Sify.com stating "he is outstanding and carries the proverbial burden of the project on his shoulder". A critic from The Hindu stated that he was "quietly effective", while a reviewer from Behindwoods.com wrote that Madhavan gives his "career-best performance" and is "excellent" at depicting his "characterization from being subtle to being outright effervescent". His performance in the film earned him the Filmfare Award for Best Actor – Tamil. His portrayal in the Hindi version, Saala Khadoos, received similar praise with critic Subhash K. Jha stating "this is Madhavan's career-defining performance, he sinks so deep into his role both physically and emotionally, that the actor becomes one with the act".

He next featured in Vikram Vedha (2017), an action thriller film directed by duo Pushkar-Gayathri and produced by Sashikanth. Telling the tale of an encounter cop and his pursuit of a gangster played by Vijay Sethupathi, Pushkar-Gayathri scripted the film with inspiration from the Vikramathithan Vedhalam folk tale, with the characterisation of both lead roles derived from that plot. For his role, Madhavan underwent arms training and met people involved with the police and defence forces. Vikram Vedha opened in July 2017 to widespread critical acclaim from the media and industry personnel. Madhavan's performance was widely appreciated by film critics, who described him as "stylish and serious" and "whole-hearted", while Sify.com's reviewer wrote it is a "treat to watch two intense performers Madhavan and Vijay Sethupathi majestically own the screen together". The film also became Madhavan's biggest commercial success in Tamil films, with trade pundits classifying the film as a blockbuster. The film earned Madhavan the Filmfare Critics Award for Best Actor – Tamil, in addition to his fourth nomination for the Filmfare Award for Best Actor – Tamil, which he lost to his co-star Vijay Sethupathi.

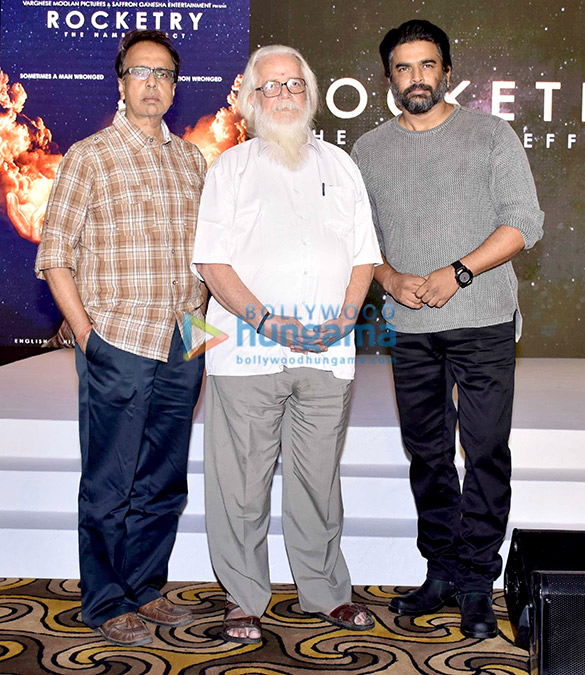
Madhavan at the first look launch of Rocketry with Nambi Narayanan and Anant Mahadevan in 2019

Madhavan next worked on a web series for Amazon titled Breathe alongside Amit Sadh, which was released in January 2018. Madhavan later revealed that he was initially sceptical of the web series format, but was "totally blown away" by the script of the series and decided to accept to work on the project, despite his commitments for the shoot of Vikram Vedha. For Breathe, Madhavan studied his own experience as a father besides researching the complexities surrounding organ donation. In the series, he played Danny Mascarenhas, a soccer coach and the father of a young boy with cystic fibrosis, who will die in six months unless he has a lung transplant. Madhavan received positive reviews for his portrayal, with film critic Subhash K. Jha writing "As Danny, Madhavan expresses grief, rage, frustration, guilt, repentance and self-destruction with measured excellence" and that "this is a showcase for an actor at the peak of his power" and "boy, does Madhavan embrace the opportunity". Similarly, a critic from the New Indian Express wrote "Madhavan is in form in a potentially compelling thriller", and a reviewer from the International Business Times wrote he "shows a range of emotions" in "a smooth, beautiful way".

His first full-length role in a Telugu film was through Savyasachi (2018), where he portrayed the antagonist in a cast headlined by Naga Chaitanya. Despite the film's average response at the box office, Madhavan won positive reviews for his performance, with a critic noting his "impressive performance" was the "saving grace of the film". Following an extended guest appearance in the Hindi film Zero (2018) alongside Shahrukh Khan and Anushka Sharma, Madhavan appeared in the bilingual thriller film Nishabdham, which was shot entirely in Seattle. The film began as a silent film, before the makers chose to insert dialogue and create Tamil and Telugu versions. In 2021, he played the title role in Maara (2021), garnering positive reviews for his portrayal of a vagabond artist from Kochi.

Between 2017 and 2022, Madhavan worked on his first film as a director, Rocketry: The Nambi Effect (2022), a biopic on Indian rocket scientist Nambi Narayanan. Alongside his directorial, screenwriting and acting credits, Madhavan also served as one of the producers of the project. During the pre-production phase, Madhavan referred to the project as his "biggest film ever" and stated that he had worked silently on the script of the film for a period of two years after becoming intrigued by hearing the tale of Narayanan's false espionage charge. In order to develop the script, Madhavan regularly met with Narayanan to discuss the scientist's life experiences. As a result of their conversations, Madhavan altered his original script to include portions from Narayanan's entire career and his services to the Indian space programme, rather than just matters related to the espionage case and his 1994 arrest. The film was shot as a biilingual venture, with scenes simultaneously filmed in the Hindi and Tamil while scenes set outside India were shot in English. The film premiered at the Marché du Film section of the 2022 Cannes Film Festival in France in May 2022, and had a theatrical release two months later. The film received positive reviews from critics. Devesh Sharma of Filmfare wrote "Madhavan carries the film on his shoulders" and that "he lives and breathes the character, getting the nuances right", adding "it"s not easy being both the lead actor and the director but Madhavan achieves the desired trajectory on both fronts". Meanwhile, Ronak Kotecha noted "Rocketry takes off well, hits some turbulence on the way, but eventually soars high with real characters and moving moments that make it worth your while". The film subsequently won Madhavan several awards during the following year, including the National Film Award for Best Feature Film as director, the IIFA Award for Best Director and SIIMA Critics Award for Best Actor.

In 2023, he appeared in the YRF web series The Railway Men directed by Shiv Rawail, based on the Bhopal disaster. Saibal Chatterjee of NDTV wrote "Rati Pandey, a senior railway official who is under a cloud for a specific act that cost him his job, appears cast in a dissimilar mould. He is the grandstanding type, the speechifier out to stir a listless workforce into action. Both the character and the performance stay stranded in an unexceptional zone". In 2024, he played the antagonist in Vikas Bahl's supernatural thriller Shaitaan, co-starring Ajay Devgn and Jyothika. The film received positive reviews from critics and was a commercial success at the box-office.

In 2025, he featured in six releases. In his first release, he played a railway ticket inspector in the comedy thriller Hisaab Barabar directed by Ashwni Dhir. His second release was the sports drama Test directed by S. Sashikanth co-starring Nayanthara and Siddharth, which streamed on Netflix. In his third release, his co-starred alongside Akshay Kumar and Ananya Panday in the historial courtroom drama Kesari Chapter 2 directed by Karan Singh Tyagi, based on the Jallianwala Bagh massacre. In his fourth release, he played a reserved middle-aged professor in the romantic comedy Aap Jaisa Koi opposite Fatima Sana Shaikh. Devesh Sharma of Filmfare noted he was in "complete control of his craft", conveying a lot through subtle, internalised acting - more with his expressions and silence than dialogue". His fifth release, the romantic comedy De De Pyaar De 2 co-starring Ajay Devgn and Rakul Preet Singh received mixed reviews from critics. His sixth and final release of the year was the spy-thriller Dhurandhar directed by Aditya Dhar, co-starring Ranveer Singh, Akshaye Khanna, Sanjay Dutt, and Arjun Rampal. Set against the backdrop of the IC-814 hijacking and 2001 Indian Parliament attack, Madhavan portrayed the role of Ajay Sanyal, a fictionalised version of IB Chief Ajit Doval. The film performed strongly at the box-office, and emerged as one of the highest-grossing Hindi films of all time. The first of a two-part series, he reprised his role in the sequel Dhurandhar: The Revenge released in March 2026.

He will next be seen in the biopic of Indian engineer Gopalswamy Doraiswamy Naidu directed by Krishnakumar Ramakumar, a family-drama based in London directed by Mithran R. Jawahar, and Rajesh Touchriver's biopic on Chempakaraman Pillai.

In 2026, Madhavan was conferred the Padma Shri, India's fourth-highest civilian honour, by the Government of India in recognition of his contributions to Indian cinema. The honour was presented by President Droupadi Murmu during the second Civil Investiture Ceremony at Rashtrapati Bhavan in New Delhi in June 2026.

== Other works ==
=== Film production and television work ===
Madhavan was first credited as a part of the technical crew for his work in Ramji Londonwaley, an adaptation of his Tamil film Nala Damayanthi. Apart from portraying the lead role, Madhavan worked on the film as a dialogue writer and played an active role in determining the crew of the movie. In October 2007, Madhavan founded the production company, Leukos Films, and consequently bought the rights of his film, Evano Oruvan, from producers Abbas–Mustan and K. Sera Sera. Securing sponsorship deals with HSBC and Santoor, Madhavan premièred the film across North America and the Middle East before its Indian theatrical release, with the promotion method being used for the first time in Tamil cinema. However, since the relative box office failure of the project, Madhavan downplayed future involvement in production ventures. The film, which Madhavan referred to as a "part of his life" during 2007, also saw him write the dialogues for the film along with Seeman by translating lines from the project's original version in the Marathi language. Madhavan then chose to become actively involved in the production of his 2016 bilingual films, Irudhi Suttru in Tamil and Saala Khadoos in Hindi, to ensure the film completed filming and had a theatrical release. Impressed by the strength of Sudha Kongara's script for the Tamil film, Madhavan felt that the story had pan-Indian appeal and took the film's script to Rajkumar Hirani, who agreed to produce and supervise work on the film's Hindi version. Madhavan co-produced the Hindi version of the film through his new production house, Tricolor Films, while leading the film's pan-Indian marketing campaign. The actor also helped select the film's lead actress, Ritika Singh, and was also credited as an additional screenplay writer in the films.

Madhavan has appeared as host for television programs on Hindi channels, while he has also been a host at film award functions. During his television career in the 1990s, Madhavan first worked as a host on Tol Mol Ke Bol. He was announced as the host of Sony Entertainment Television's Deal Ya No Deal, the Indian version of the American game show Deal or No Deal, in October 2005. However, Madhavan quit as the lead anchor of the show in January 2006 claiming he was unhappy with the way the shoot schedules were handled by the production house. According to the actor, when he took on the show, he had made it clear that he would continue with his South Indian film assignments, and as the show was being filmed in Mumbai, he had found it hard to keep travelling throughout India from Chennai to film the ten days a month he had signed up for. Madhavan added that he was restricted by the producers to spend one day rehearsing technically, which left him with fatigue. Mandira Bedi subsequently replaced Madhavan as the anchor in February for Series 2 of the game show. In June 2010, Madhavan made a return to the game show format by accepting a contract with Imagine TV's Big Money show, signing on to host a single season, and then hosted an episode of the crime show Savdhaan India in January 2016. Furthermore, he has been a guest judge in the Indian television show, Fame Gurukul. In 2016, Madhavan stated that he would only take part in television commitments for money, while he does not consider his payment when signing on to appear in films. Madhavan has also hosted live events, including the National Film Awards in 2013 with Huma Qureshi. He was also the host of the 55th Filmfare Awards South in Chennai in 2008 and then also the Vijay Awards in 2013.

=== Brand ambassador ===
Madhavan is a brand ambassadors for products in India. His early work involved advertisements for brands including Bajaj, Ponds, Fair & Lovely and TVS, before signing an endorsement deal with Pepsi and marketing company, IMG. In 2007, Madhavan endorsed UniverCell, a multi-brand mobile phone retail chain owned by UniverCell Telecommunications India Pvt Ltd. Madhavan signed a contract with the mobile phone network, Airtel for promotions in South India before being promoted as the pan-Indian ambassador for the brand a year later. His advertisements with Vidya Balan for Airtel won critical acclaim, and brought in film offers for the pair to feature together. In June 2010, marketers from Arun Excello promoted a housing project in Oragadam, Chennai in a similar fashion to the release of a new film featuring Madhavan. With film-inspired posters and billboards put up around Chennai, the advertisement campaign attracted huge curiosity and the project became a success. His long-term work with jewellery brand, Joy Alukkas, led to the company creating life size wax models of him to place in their showrooms from January 2011. Maruti Suzuki, for whom Madhavan is the brand ambassador, launched a special edition of the Suzuki Wagon R car calling it the Madhavan Signature Edition in September 2013. In 2015, online market place Snapdeal signed on Aamir Khan and Madhavan to be the company's ambassadors, with Snapdeal attempting to use Madhavan's popularity in South India to marker their

== Humanitarian causes ==
Madhavan, who is a vegetarian, promotes vegetarianism and is an active member of PETA. Since joining PETA after starring in his first film, he has appeared in several advertisements and released an E-Card for the brand. In July 2006, Madhavan was voted the "cutest male vegetarian" by an online poll conducted by the PETA, while Kareena Kapoor won the female award respectively. In turn he cited that his result in the competition was due to his "healthy vegetarian diet". In October 2010, he wrote a letter to the CEO of Kentucky Fried Chicken, on behalf of PETA, urging them to stop mistreatment of birds by the fast-food industry outlets and the killing of animals. He requested the boycott of KFC in India over animal welfare and conditions and was joined by Raveena Tandon and Rakhi Sawant in supporting the work of PETA in India. In addition, Madhavan was named PETA India's 2012 "Person Of The Year", while his son won PETA India's "Compassionate Kid award" in December 2014.

Madhavan has lent his support for the Chennai-based charity, The Banyan, and appeared in the charity musical Netru, Indru, Naalai directed by Mani Ratnam for the cause. He appeared as a guest cook and newly launched restaurant in Chennai and cooked dosas for auction for the charity, helping raise forty five thousand rupees. He has been a part of an AIDS awareness programme initiated by Richard Gere in India and helped promote the A Time for Heroes campaign appearing in a short film. Similarly Madhavan featured in a four-minute film produced by Agaram Foundation, Herova? Zerova?, campaigning for educational awareness alongside Suriya, Vijay and Jyothika. In 2010, along with his cast and crew from 3 Idiots, he helped raise Rs. 2.5 million for the renovation of the school in Leh, which was damaged by flash floods. Madhavan laid bricks and tiles at the London Business School in July 2011, building a symbolic house to represent the 100,000 houses that will be built in India by 2015 as a part of Habitat for Humanity's campaign to improve substandard houses in India. During the 2015 South Indian floods, Madhavan worked alongside other Indian actors in coordinating the relief efforts. In 2016, Lepra India signed him to work as a goodwill ambassador in helping promote action against leprosy.

== In the media ==
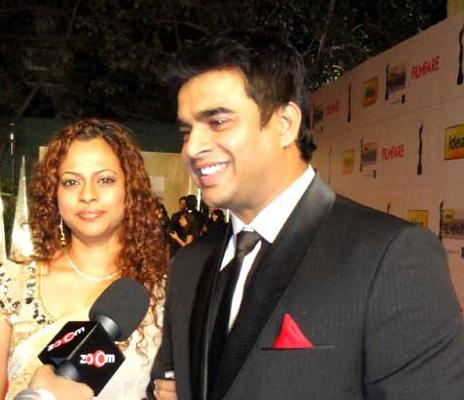
Madhavan seen with his wife, Sarita, at the Filmfare Awards ceremony in 2011

Madhavan is one of the few actors in India who garners pan-Indian appeal, with his success in establishing himself in the North and the South Indian film industries, seeing him receive multiple offers as a brand ambassador. Furthermore, it has led to producers offering him lead roles in bilingual films such as the English-Malayalam crossover film Nothing But Life and the Hindi-Tamil projects, Yavarum Nalam and Irudhi Suttru. Moreover, most of his Tamil films are dubbed into Telugu, where he has created a box office market without appearing in a single straight Telugu film as a lead actor (during the 2000s). Madhavan holds a significant female fan following, which developed after his romantic roles in Alai Payuthey and Minnale. Madhavan has also been active in keeping in contact with fans, maintaining a fan email account, a Facebook fan page and a Twitter account as well as being one of the first actors of Tamil films to turn blogger with entries in the year 2000.

He has appeared at functions as a special guest, and has enjoyed particularly close links with technology company, Sify, whom he signed on as his media partner for all his future releases after expressing satisfaction at the website they created for Rendu. Madhavan sat among a six-man jury for the selection of CNN-IBN Indian of the Year 2006. He inaugurated the Chennai International Film Festival in 2007, taking the opportunity to deliver a message on preserving the environment.

A gaming company, Paradox Studios Limited, launched a new game compatible with mobile phones in July 2006, with Madhavan as the lead character. The company released two mobile game titles featuring Madhavan as their lead character. The first of the two games, Madhavan's MIG, featured the actor reprising his role of a pilot from Rang De Basanti. In the other game titled Madhavan, the player had to help the actor get to the première of his latest movie evading the paparazzi. In 2007, prominent entrepreneur N. R. Narayana Murthy requested Madhavan to be his interviewer at the India-Singapore Exposition and Madhavan went on to claim that the experience was "unforgettable" as Murthy was an idol to him. Madhavan has attended conferences as a motivational speaker, talking about issues including situational awareness and confidence, with a speech delivered at Damodaran Academy of Management, Coimbatore going viral online. Madhavan also took part and delivered speeches as a part of the annual India Conference at Harvard University during 2017.

== Personal life ==
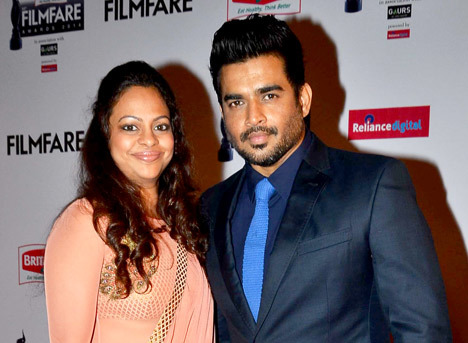
Madhavan with wife Sarita at Filmfare Award function

After completing the degree, he went on to teach communication and public speaking at workshops around India. At the Maharashtra workshop, he encountered his wife Sarita Birje for the first time in 1991, when she attended his class on the recommendation of her cousins. Sarita was able to use the skills she had learned from Madhavan's classes to pass an interview to become an air hostess and after completing the course, the pair began dating. They married in 1999, before Madhavan entered mainstream films. The pair's marriage has been covered by the media, with Madhavan citing that advice from his mentor Mani Ratnam was useful. Sarita has worked as a costume designer in a few of Madhavan's films, most notably for Guru En Aalu (2009), when she worked along with Erum Ali, the wife of Madhavan's co-star, Abbas, for their respective husbands. Their son Vedaant Madhavan, who is now an international swimmer, was born on 21 August 2005. His birth eventually led to them relocating to the boat-club area in Chennai from Kilpauk, where Madhavan's parents lived with him as well as his parents-in-law. In 2009, Madhavan relocated to Kandivali, Mumbai, with his wife and son, as he pursued a career in Hindi films ahead of films in the South Indian industries. In 2021, Madhavan and his family moved to Dubai, UAE, to support his son's swimming training.

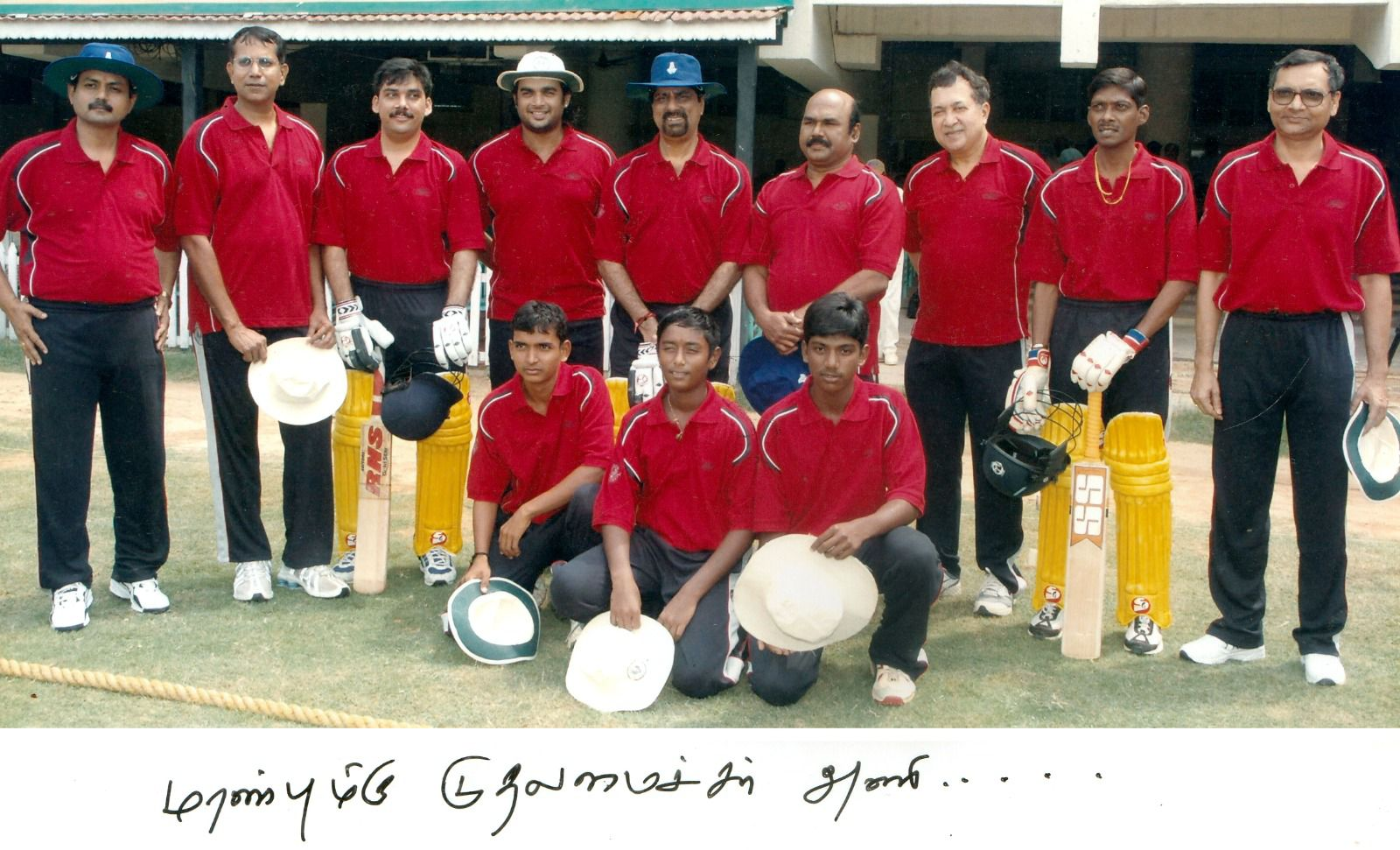
Madhavan along with his teammates of the Tamil Nadu Chief Minister's XI (CM's XI), an invitational cricket team selected by J. Jayalalithaa, after defeating the South Australian XI in a friendly cricket match on 29 September 2005

Madhavan has maintained close links with fellow actors and has described actor Suriya as his best friend in the film industry. He also is close friends with actresses Shilpa Shetty and Bipasha Basu, as well as actors Aamir Khan, Abhishek Bachchan, and Siddharth. He is closely associated with actor Kamal Haasan, after their appearance together in Anbe Sivam, and has revealed that he considers the actor as his inspiration. He has also collaborated multiple times with directors Mani Ratnam, Rajkumar Hirani, and Aanand L. Rai, citing that the film makers "understand him well" and share a good "comfort level". He has also helped out actresses Reemma Sen, Sadha and Nisha Kothari by signing them on for roles in his films, when they were going through a barren spell.

Madhavan announced a sabbatical from films in late 2010 citing he would take the time off to visit London, lose weight, play golf, take treatment for his knee injury and spend time with family. Though he kept away from starting new projects, during the period he was involved in the promotional activity of two of his releases, Manmadan Ambu and Tanu Weds Manu. He later made a comeback, earlier than anticipated, after director Linguswamy convinced him to work on Vettai. The actor later took an extended sabbatical from 2012 onwards to work on his fitness and get into shape for his role as a retired boxer in Irudhi Suttru. Madhavan is a keen golf player, having played for pleasure alongside actor Amitabh Bachchan and director Mani Ratnam, while also appearing in a celebrity charity event in 2007. In 2017, he won the qualification round of the Mumbai leg of the Mercedes Trophy golf meet and subsequently qualified for the National Finals. He also made an appearance for Chennai Rhinos in the 2011 Celebrity Cricket League, playing against Karnataka Bulldozers. His experiences flying Cessna planes when he was with National Cadet Corps, also led to a passion for aero-modelling, with the actor stating it "justified his decision" to pursue a degree in electronics.

== Awards ==
Madhavan Ranganathan at the Civil Investiture Ceremony-II at Rashtrapati Bhavan

- 2000: Filmfare Award for Best Male Debut – South for Alaipayuthey
- 2002: Tamil Nadu State Film Award for Best Actor for Run, Kannathil Muthamittal & Anbe Sivam
- 2003: ITFA Best Supporting Actor Award for Anbe Sivam
- 2004: Filmfare Award for Best Supporting Actor - Tamil for Aaytha Ezhuthu
- 2015: Tamil Nadu State Film Award for Best Actor for Irudhi Suttru
- 2016: Filmfare Award for Best Actor – Tamil for Irudhi Suttru
- 2016: SIIMA Award for Best Actor (Critics) – Tamil for Irudhi Suttru
- 2016: IIFA Utsavam Award for Best Actor – Tamil for Irudhi Suttru
- 2017: Filmfare Award for Best Actor – Tamil (Critics) for Vikram Vedha
- 2017: SIIMA Award for Best Actor – Tamil for Vikram Vedha
- 2017: Norway Tamil Film Festival Award for Best Actor for Vikram Vedha
- 2022: National Film Award for Best Feature Film for Rocketry: The Nambi Effect
- 2022: IIFA Award for Best Director for Rocketry: The Nambi Effect
- 2022: Filmfare Award for Best Actor – Tamil (Critics) for Rocketry: The Nambi Effect
- 2026: Padma Shri by Government of India in field of Art
