= Vedaant Madhavan =

Indian swimmer (born 2005)

Personal information
- Nationality: Indian
- Born: August 21, 2005 (age 21) Mumbai, India
- Height: 6 ft 3 in (191 cm)

Sport
- Sport: Swimming
- Strokes: Freestyle
- College team: Virginia Tech Hokies (2023–present)
- Coach: Pradeep Kumar Sreedharan
Medal record
Men's swimming
Representing India
Event	1st	2nd	3rd
Asian Age Group Championships	0	1	0
Danish Open	1	1	0
Latvia Open	0	0	1
Malaysia Age Group Championships	5	0	0
Thailand Age Group Championships	0	0	1
National Games	0	1	1
National Championships	0	0	6
Junior National Championships	7	4	0
Khelo India Youth Games	5	2	0
Total	18	9	9

Vedaant Madhavan (born 21 August 2005) is an Indian freestyle swimmer. He won five gold medals at the Malaysia Age Group Championships in 2023, a gold and silver medalist at the 2022 Danish Open, and a bronze medalist at the 2021 Latvian Open swimming competitions. He represented India at the 2022 FINA World Junior Swimming Championships, the 2023 Commonwealth Youth Games, and the 2026 Asian Games.

== Early life ==
Vedaant Madhavan was born on 21 August 2005 in Mumbai to fashion designer Sarita Birje and actor R. Madhavan. He initially trained in swimming at the Goregaon Sports Club, and later shifted to Glenmark Aquatic Foundation in 2017. He finished his high school at Universal American School in Dubai. He majored in marketing from Virginia Tech and was a part of the swimming team Virginia Tech Hokies.

== Career ==
Vedaant won his first international medal at the 2018 Thailand Age Group Swimming Championships, where he clinched the bronze medal in 1500 m freestyle event. In the 46th Junior Indian National Aquatic Championships held in 2019, he won four medals including three gold medals and a silver medal. In the 10th Asian Age Group Championships held later that year, he was part of the Indian team that won a silver medal in 4 × 100 m freestyle relay.

In February 2021, Vedaant won the bronze medal in the 1500 m freestyle at the Latvia Open. In the 75th Senior National Aquatic Championships held in October 2021, he won bronze medals in the 800 m and 1500 m freestyle events. At the 2022 Danish Open, he won his first ever international gold medal in the 800 m freestyle and also won a silver in the 1500 m freestyle events. In the 48th Indian Junior National Championship in July 2022, he won seven medals including four gold medals. He later represented India at the 8th FINA World Junior Championships held in Peru in September 2022.

In October 2022, Vedaant won a silver and a bronze medal in the freestyle relay events at the 36th National Games. In the Khelo India Youth Games held in February 2023, he won seven medals, including five gold and two silver. In the 58th Malaysia Invitational Age Group Swimming Championships held in April 2023, he won five gold medals in the freestyle swimming events, while setting personal bests in the 50 m and 400 m freestyle events. He was the flag bearer for India during the opening ceremony of the 2023 Commonwealth Youth Games. He finished fifth in the 1500 m freestyle event while setting a personal best time. He won three bronze medals in the freestyle relay events at the 79th Senior National Aquatic Championships in June 2026. He is part of the Indian squad for the 2026 Asian Games.

== Select results ==
Year	Tournament	Event	Medal
2018	Thailand Age Group Championships	1500 m freestyle	Bronze
2019	Asian Age Group Championships	4 × 100 m freestyle relay	Silver
2021	Latvia Open	1500 m freestyle	Bronze
2022	Danish Open	800 m freestyle	Gold
2022	Danish Open	1500 m freestyle	Silver
2023	Malaysia Age Group Championships	50 m freestyle	Gold
2023	Malaysia Age Group Championships	100 m freestyle	Gold
2023	Malaysia Age Group Championships	200 m freestyle	Gold
2023	Malaysia Age Group Championships	400 m freestyle	Gold
2023	Malaysia Age Group Championships	1500 m freestyle	Gold

== See also ==
- Swimming in India
