= Bhram =

- Poster
- Directed by: Pavan S. Kaul
- Written by: Bhavani Iyer; Radhika Anand; Irshad Kamil; Kumaar
- Produced by: Nari Hira
- Starring: Dino Morea; Milind Soman; Sheetal Menon; Simone Singh; Karan Singh Grover
- Cinematography: Hiroo Keswani
- Edited by: K. Rajagopal
- Music by: Pritam; Suhash Kulkarni
- Release date: 4 April 2008
- Running time: 129 minutes
- Country: India
- Language: Hindi

Bhram (transl. Illusion) is a 2008 Indian Hindi-language thriller film starring Dino Morea, Milind Soman and Sheetal Menon. It was produced by Nari Hira and directed by Pavan Kaul. The music of the film was composed by Pritam. The film was a disaster at the box office.

== Plot ==
Antara Tyagi is a supermodel who seems to have everything but under her shiny life is a sad history. Shantanu Rawal, the towns eligible bachelor falls in love, with her. As their relationship grows he faces problems that challenge his love his belief, his family ties and his friends.

== Cast ==
- Dino Morea as Shantanu Rawal
- Milind Soman as Devendra 'Inder' Rawal
- Sheetal Menon as Antara Y. Tyagi
- Simone Singh as Vinita Devendra Rawal
- Chetan Hansraj as Prem Mathur
- Deepshikha Nagpal as Sunita Sharma
- Ananya Shukla as Little Antara
- Karan Singh Grover as Carlson
- Vishal Watwani as Vishal Sharma
- Deepak Jethi as Kuldeep Rathore

== Soundtrack ==
The soundtrack was composed by Pritam. Lyrics were written by Irshad Kamil and Kumaar.

Title	Singer(s)	Length
"Jaane Kaisa Hai Tu"	Shaan	5:24
"I Am A Bad Boy"	Suraj Jagan, Earl D'Souza, Sunaina	4:38
"Meri Akhiyaan"	Richa Sharma	4:13
"Teri Aankhon Ki Narmi"	Siddharth Suhas	4:22
"Lagdaa Naa Lagdaa "	KK	4:58
"Jaane Kyun Tanha Ho Gaye"	Sonu Nigam	5:57
