= Simone Singh =

Indian actress and model

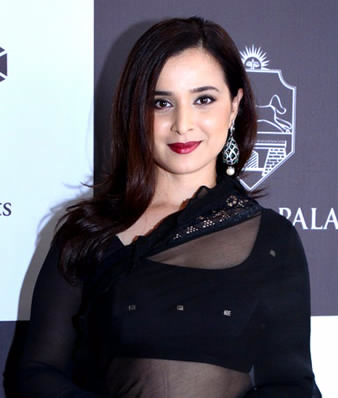
- Singh in 2013
- Born: 10 November 1974 (age 51); Jamshedpur, Bihar (present-day Jharkhand)
- Occupation: Actress
- Spouse: Fahad Samar
- Father: Daljit Singh

Simone Singh Samar (born 10 November 1974) is an Indian actress who primarily works in Hindi films and television. Singh is best known for her role in television shows Heena, A Mouthful of Sky and Ek Hasina Thi, and the films Kabhi Khushi Kabhie Gham, Being Cyrus and Maja Ma. For Ek Hasina Thi, she won the ITA Award for Best Actress in a Negative Role.

== Early life ==
Singh was born in Jamshedpur on 10 November 1974. Her father Daljit Singh is former Indian first-class cricketer and pitch curator.

== Career ==
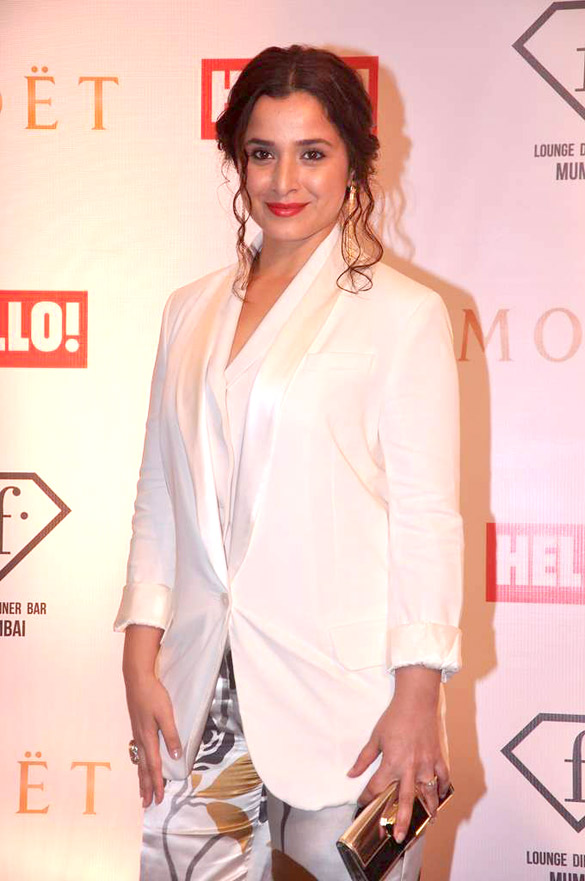
Singh in 2012

Singh made her acting debut with the English language series A Mouthful of Sky followed by a role in Sea Hawks in 1995. She played the title role in another popular television series Heena, which gave her wide recognition and was the highest rated show on Indian television at the time. Singh's popular roles in films include: Camilla in Kal Ho Na Ho and Rukshar in Kabhi Khushi Kabhie Gham. She is the first Indian TV actress to present at the International Emmy Awards in NYC. She also served on the jury of the International Emmy Awards.

Singh received acclaim for her role in Being Cyrus, co-starring Boman Irani, Dimple Kapadia and Saif Ali Khan. Indrani Roy Mitra from Rediff.com stated: "Singh ably compliments Boman's presence, playing his naïve and oppressed wife to the T."

Singh played a powerful rich woman Sakshi Goenka in the 2014 series Ek Hasina Thi. A critic of The Indian Express noted, "The most interesting and powerful performance is by Simone. Her attitude and elegance comes across distinctly in her character." Her performance earned her the ITA Award for Best Actress in a Negative Role and Indian Telly Award for Best Actress in a Negative Role.

In 2022, Singh played a wife struggling with her sexual identity alongside Madhuri Dixit in the film Maja Ma. Reviewing the film, Saibal Chatterjee noted: "One member of the supporting cast who deserves a special mention is Simone Singh, cast as the coquette whose life, as it transpires, is beset also by a slew of troubles."

== Filmography ==
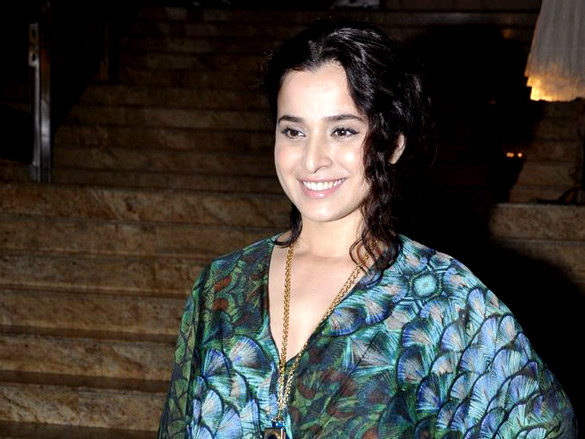
Simone Singh at Lakme Fashion Week in 2012

=== Films ===
Year	Title	Role	Notes
2001	Ek Rishtaa: The Bond of Love	Priya Kapoor	
2001	Kabhi Khushi Kabhie Gham	Rukhsar Begum	Guest appearance
2002	Haan Maine Bhi Pyaar Kiya	Meghna	
2002	Sur – The Melody of Life	Divya	
2003	Sssshhh...	Malini Gujral	
2003	Kal Ho Naa Ho	Camilla	Special appearance
2006	Being Cyrus	Tina Sethna	
2007	Marigold	Shazia	
2007	Delhii Heights	Saima	
2008	Bhram	Vinnie	
2008	Via Darjeeling	Preeti R. Sen	
2009	99	Jahnavi	
2010	Rann	Nalini	
2019	Pal Pal Dil Ke Paas	Vandana Sethi	
2019	Laal Kaptaan	Begum	
2020	Love Aaj Kal	Zoe's Mother	
2022	Maja Ma	Kanchan Adhia	

=== Television ===
Year	Title	Role	Notes
1995	Swabhimaan	Gayatri	
1995	A Mouthful of Sky	Madhulika	
1997	Sea Hawks	Rupal	
1997	Ajeeb Dastaan Hai Yeh	Anita	
1997	Thoda Hai Thode Ki Zaroorat Hai	Chandni	
1998–2003	Heena	Heena	
1999	Hello Friends	Sanjana	
2001	Tum Pukar Lo	Piya	
2003–2004	Aandhi	Chandni	
2004	Kosmiic Chat	Host/presenter	
2005	Kasshish	Pia	
2007	Virasat	Anushka Lamba	
2014	Ek Hasina Thi	Sakshi Goenka	
2019–2020	Bahu Begum	Razia Begum	

=== Web series ===
Year	Name	Role	Notes
2018	Haq Se	Fatima	
2019–2025	Four More Shots Please!	Sneha Patel	
2023	Jee Karda	Antara Singh	
2024	Raisinghani vs Raisinghani	Dr. Ramaya Grewal	

== Awards and nominations ==
Year	Award	Category	Work	Result	Ref.
2002	Indian Telly Awards	Best Actress in a Lead Role	Heena	Nominated	
2003	Indian Telly Awards	Best Actress in a Lead Role	Heena	Nominated	
2003	Stardust Award	Best Supporting Actress	Sur – The Melody of Life	Won	
2015	Indian Telly Awards	Best Actress in a Negative Role	Ek Hasina Thi	Won	
2015	Indian Television Academy Awards	Best Actress in a Negative Role	Ek Hasina Thi	Won	

== See also ==
- List of Indian television actresses
