= Kosmiic Chat =

Indian talk show

- Genre: Talk show
- Developed by: Ekta Kapoor
- Starring: Sunita Menon; Simone Singh
- Country of origin: India
- Original languages: Hindi; English
- No. of seasons: 1
- No. of episodes: 20

Production
- Producers: Ekta Kapoor; Shobha Kapoor
- Production locations: Mumbai, Maharashtra, India
- Camera setup: Single-camera
- Running time: Approx. 45 minutes
- Production company: Balaji Telefilms

Original release
- Network: Zoom
- Release: 19 September 2004

Kosmiic Chat is an Indian talk show created and produced by Ekta Kapoor and Shobha Kapoor under their banner Balaji Telefilms. The series premiered on 19 September 2004 on Zoom.

== Plot ==
The series is a talk show where chats revolve around generational shift in the 21st century, the youth and their habits, changing tastes and behaviour are discussed.

== Cast ==
- Sunita Menon
- Simone Singh
- Rohit Roy
