= Heena (TV series) =

- Created by: Rajeev Tandon
- Directed by: Javed Sayyed
- Starring: see below
- Opening theme: "Aisi Yeh Duniya Kyun Hai" by Jagjit Singh
- Country of origin: India
- No. of episodes: 265

Production
- Running time: 22 minutes

Original release
- Network: Sony Entertainment Television
- Release: 12 June 1998 – 11 July 2003

Heena is a Hindi-language television soap opera that aired on Sony Entertainment Television. The series began to air from 12 June 1998 and ran for five years, finishing on 11 July 2003.

The opening theme song for the serial was taken from a Ghazal sung by Jagjit Singh titled as Koi Yeh Kaise Bataye. Lead actors included Simone Singh, Rahul Bhat, Rakhee Tandon, and Vaquar Shaikh.

== Plot ==
The show was based on the trials and tribulations in the life of a woman. Heena who is married to Sameer, but her marriage is doomed from the wedding night itself when Sameer proclaims his undying love for another woman, Ruby. Finally their unhappy marriage ends in a divorce. A while after the divorce Sameers best friend Akram decides to marry Heena. Heena is very happy with Akram and thinks that he is the one. But Ruby strikes again and enters Heena's life as Akram's second wife.

Heena finally manages to be free of Akram and gathers courage to rebuild her life and establish her own identity. Heena looks forward to her new life as a mother and dreams of a beautiful healthy child. But Heena's trials are not over yet. At the hospital Heena gives birth to twins. However one baby gets kidnapped, Heena is in a critical state. In order to save her further trauma, her father tells her that one baby is dead. Heena eventually finds out that her child was kidnapped and is alive. After a lot of struggle, she gets back her second child and lives a happy life thereafter with Sameer and her twin children.

== Cast ==
- Ram Kapoor as Dr. Amir
- Simone Singh as Heena Nawab Mirza
- Rakhee Tandon as Rubina
- Vaquar Sheikh as Akram
- Rahul Bhat as Sameer (Heena's ex-husband, and friend)
- Parikshit Sahni as Nawab Mirza (Heena's father)
- Maya Alagh as Begum Shagufta (Heena's mother)
- Rajeev Verma as Faizaan
- Sudha Chandran as Sultana, (Rubina's aunt)
- Zarina Wahab as Nagma, (Rubina's mother)
- Lata Haya/Meenal Kenkre as Heena's aunty
- Sonia Kapoor as Nameera
- Bobby Vats as Tauqeer (nameera's husband)
- Dilip Dhawan/Tariq Shah as Dr. Sarfaraz Khan (Akram's father)
- Neena Kulkarni as Gulnaar
- Satish Verma as Heena's uncle
- Kabir Sadanand as Adv Rehaan
- Milind Gunaji Adv Sher Khan
- Jaya Bhattacharya Advocate Lata
- Ketki Dave as Heena's neighbour
- Nandita Thakur as Mrs.Sharma
- Achala Vyas as Doctor
- Jyoti as Poonam
- Anupam Shyam as Mr.Saxena
