= Milind Soman =

Indian actor and model (born 1965)

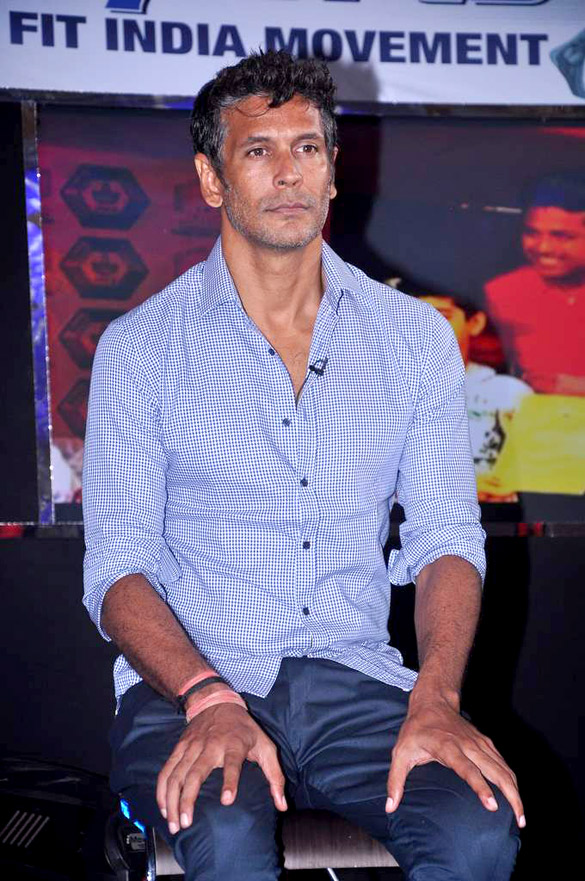
- Soman at the 2012 NDTV Marks for Sports event
- Born: 4 November 1965 (age 60); Glasgow, Scotland
- Occupations: Model; Actor; Producer; TV presenter; Athlete
- Height: 1.80 m (5 ft 11 in)
- Spouses: Mylene Jampanoi (m. 2006; div. 2009); Ankita Konwar (m. 2018)

Milind Usha Soman (born 4 November 1965) is an Indian actor, model, film producer, and fitness enthusiast. He rose to fame in the year 1995, when he got featured in Alisha Chinai's music video, Made in India. The same year, he made his debut as a television actor in A Mouthful of Sky. Later, he was seen in the Indian science fiction TV Series Captain Vyom. He also participated as contestant on the reality show Fear Factor: Khatron Ke Khiladi 3 which aired on Colors TV.

== Early and personal life ==
Soman was born on 4 November 1965 in Glasgow, Scotland in a Marathi Brahmin family. His family moved to Scotland where he lived until the age of seven, then his family moved back to Mumbai, India in 1973. He attended Dr. Antonio Da Silva High School and Jr. College of Commerce, Bombay.

As a child Soman was enrolled in a Rashtriya Swayamsevak Sangh (RSS) shakha by his father, when he was 10 years old. Later, he completed his Diploma in Electrical Engineering.

Milind Soman met Mylene Jampanoi, a French actress, on the sets of their 2006 film, Valley of Flowers. The couple married in July 2006 at a resort in Goa. Soman and Jampanoi separated in 2008 and divorced in 2009.

Soman married Ankita Konwar on 22 April 2018 in Alibaug.

== Career ==
In 1995, Soman got featured in Alisha Chinai's music video, Made in India. The same year, he made his debut as a television actor in A Mouthful of Sky. Later, he was seen in the Indian science fiction TV Series Captain Vyom and also played part in the TV series Sea Hawks. Soman has worked in films such as Pachaikili Muthucharam, Paiyaa, Agni Varsha and Rules: Pyaar Ka Superhit Formula. In 2007 he appeared in Bhram, Say Salaam India and Bheja Fry. In 2009 he acted in Sachin Kundalkar's Marathi film Gandha. He has also acted in English language, foreign language films and television series, including Valley of Flowers and The Flag. In the Swedish film Arn – The Knight Templar he portrayed Saladin, the revered 12th-century Kurdish leader of the Arabs and Muslims. He was also seen playing an important role in the film Bajirao Mastani.

Soman has also produced Hindi film Rules: Pyaar Ka Superhit Formula and television serial Ghost Bana Dost.

In 2010, he participated in the reality show Fear Factor: Khatron Ke Khiladi 3. He was also seen in Amazon Prime series Four More Shots Please as Dr. Aamir Warsi and Alt Balaji series Paurashpur as Boris.

== Sports ==
He started swimming aged 6. He has represented Maharashtra at the age of 10 in various age groups before going on to represent his state at the senior level. Soman represented India in swimming in the inaugural South Asian Games (then known as South Asian Federation Games) in 1984 held at Kathmandu where he won a Silver medal. In 2015, Milind completed the Ironman challenge in 15 hours and 19 minutes, in his first try. He has also been on Limca Book of Records for running 1500 km in 30 days. Furthermore, he ran the Berlin Marathon 2016 of 42.2 km in 4 hours and 32 minutes.

== In the media ==
In 1995, Milind Soman and his then-girlfriend, Madhu Sapre, an ex-Miss India and model attracted controversy in India, when the pair posed nude in a print ad for Tuffs Shoes. The social service branch of the Mumbai police had registered a case in August 1995 after Sapre and Soman posed in the nude, wearing only shoes and a python wrapped around them. Another case was filed under the Wildlife Protection Act against the advertising agency for illegal use of the python. The accused include the publishers and distributors of two magazines that featured the controversial ad, the advertising agency, the two models, and the photographers. The case dragged on for 14 years, after which the courts acquitted the accused.

On his 55th birthday in 2020, Soman shared a photograph on social media of himself running in the nude on a beach in Goa. The incident led to the creation of many Internet memes featuring the picture. In addition, the actor was booked by the local police under section 294 (obscenity) of the Indian Penal Code, along with other relevant sections of the Information Technology Act.

He has also starred in a controversial ad for Vim, promoting dishwashing liquid for men.

== Filmography ==
=== Films ===
Year	Title	Role	Language	Notes
2000	Tarkieb	Captain Ajit Verma	Hindi	
2002	Pyar Ki Dhun	Rohit	Hindi	
2002	16 December	Vikram	Hindi	
2002	Agni Varsha	Arvasu	Hindi	
2003	Rules: Pyaar Ka Superhit Formula	Vikram Varma	Hindi	Also producer
2003	Surya	Surya	Hindi	
2005	Jurm	Rohit	Hindi	
2005	Bhagmati	Muhammad Quli Qutb Shah	Hindi	
2006	Valley of Flowers	Jalan	Hindi, Japanese	
2006	Katputtli	Arjun	Hindi	
2007	Pachaikili Muthucharam	Lawrence	Tamil	
2007	Say Salaam India	Harry Oberoi	Hindi	
2007	Bheja Fry	Anant Ghoshal	Hindi	
2007	Arn - Tempelriddaren	Saladin	Swedish	
2008	Arn – The Kingdom at Road's End	Saladin	Swedish	
2008	Bhram	Devendra	Hindi	
2009	The Flag	Arjun	Hindi	
2009	Satyameva Jeyathe	Ranadev	Telugu	
2009	Gandha: Smell	Sarang	Marathi	
2009	Do Paise Ki Dhoop, Chaar Aane Ki Baarish	Sameer	Hindi	
2009	Shadow	Rahul Kapoor	Hindi	
2010	Paiyaa	Baali	Tamil	
2010	Nakshatra	Inspector Gupta	Hindi	
2011	Vithagan	Badri	Tamil	
2012	Agent Hamilton: But Not If It Concerns Your Daughter	Abdul Rahman	English	
2012	Jodi Breakers	Mark	Hindi	
2013	David	The Gangster	Hindi	
2013	Alex Pandian	Alvin Martin	Tamil	
2013	Samhita	The King	Marathi	
2015	Nagrik	Vikas Patil	Marathi	
2015	Bajirao Mastani	Ambaji Pant Purandare	Hindi	
2017	Chef	Biju	Hindi	
2017	Mukti - Birth of a Nation	General J. F. R. Jacob	English	Short film
2018	Hamara Tiranga	Arjun	Hindi	
2021	Doctor	Colonel James Anderson	Tamil	
2023	One Friday Night	Ram Varma	Hindi	
2023	Lakadbaggha	Tarun Bakshi	Hindi	
2023	Starfish	Arlo	Hindi	
2025	Emergency	Sam Manekshaw	Hindi	
2026	Udumbanchola Vision		Malayalam	

=== Television ===
Year	Title	Role	Language	Notes
1995	A Mouthful of Sky	Akash Bhandarkar	English	
1996	Daayra		Hindi	
1997–1998	Vakaalat		Hindi	
1997–1998	Sea Hawks	Vikram Rajpoot	Hindi	
1997	Margarita	Pedro	Hindi	Also producer
1997–1999	Tanha		Hindi	
1998–1999	Captain Vyom	Captain Vyom	Hindi	
2000–2001	Noorjahan	Salim	Hindi	
2000	Deewarein		Hindi	
2006–2007	Ghost Bana Dost		Hindi	Producer
2010	Fear Factor: Khatron Ke Khiladi 3	Contestant	Hindi	
2012	MTV Rush	Himself	Hindi	Also producer
2017–2018	India's Next Top Model	Judge	English, Hindi	
2019-2021	MTV Supermodel of the Year	Judge	English, Hindi	
2019–2020	Four More Shots Please!	Dr. Aamir Warsi	English, Hindi	
2020	Paurashpur	Boris	Hindi	
2022	Masaba Masaba	Himself	Hindi	
2025	The Royals	Maharaj Yuvanath Singh	Hindi	Ex maharaja of Morpur
2026	Muthu Engira Kaattaan	Sivettan	Tamil	

=== Music videos ===
Year	Title	Singer(s)	Ref.
1995	Made in India (album)	Alisha Chinai	
1997	Jaanam Samjha Karo (album)	Asha Bhosle	
1999	Deewana (album)	Sonu Nigam	
2022	Shringar	Akasa Singh, Aastha Gill, Raftaar	
