= Ashok Banker =

Indian writer

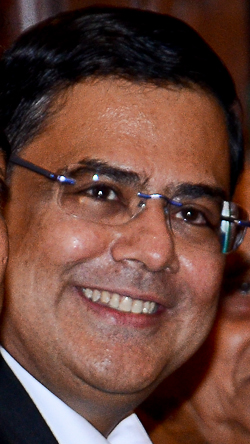
- Banker at the Ten Kings book launch in Chennai, 2014
- Born: Ashok Kumar Banker; 7 February 1964 (age 62); Mumbai, Maharashtra, India
- Occupation: Author
- Spouse: Bithika Banker (m. 1987)
- Children: Ayushyoda Banker, Yashka Banker
- Writing career
- Period: Contemporary
- Notable works: Ten Kings (2014); Blood Red Sari (2012); Slayer of Kamsa (2009); Prince of Ayodhya (2003); Vertigo (1994); The Iron Bra (1992)

Ashok Kumar Banker (born 7 February 1964 in Mumbai, India) is an author and screenwriter. His writing spans crime thrillers, essays, literary criticism, fiction and Indian mythology. The author of several well-received novels including a trilogy billed as "India's first crime novels in English", he became widely known for his retellings of Indian mythological epics, starting with the internationally acclaimed and best-selling eight-volume Ramayana series. His books have sold over 2 million copies and have been published in 16 languages in 58 countries. His Epic India Library is an attempt at retelling all the myths, legends and itihasa of the Indian sub-continent in one story cycle comprising over 70 volumes.

== Early life ==
=== Childhood ===
Ashok Banker was born in Mumbai in 1964 soon after his parents' divorce. Ashok Banker's parents were an Anglo-Indian mother and a Gujarati Hindu father. Banker was raised by his British grandmother, May Agnes Smith. May was born in Ceylon, married Mr. D'Souza, an Indian Christian from Goa, and the couple settled in Byculla in Mumbai. Growing up in Mumbai, Banker had a multi-religious background, growing up in a Christian household and being educated in a Jewish school.

Banker's grandmother financed the publication of his first book, a collection of poetry titled Ashes in the Dust of Time, which he self-published at age 15.

== Career ==
=== Journalism ===
Ashok Banker worked as a freelance journalist and columnist for several years, for publications such as The Times of India and Outlook magazine. He was also a reviewer and commentator on contemporary Indian literature, an essayist, literary critic and reviewer.

=== Literary contribution ===
Banker is a contemporary Indian novelist. His work has been included in anthologies such as The Vintage Book of Modern Indian Literature and The Picador Book of Modern Indian Literature. His novel Vertigo, published in 1992, was praised by critics and readers including the late Dom Moraes.

=== Crime fiction ===
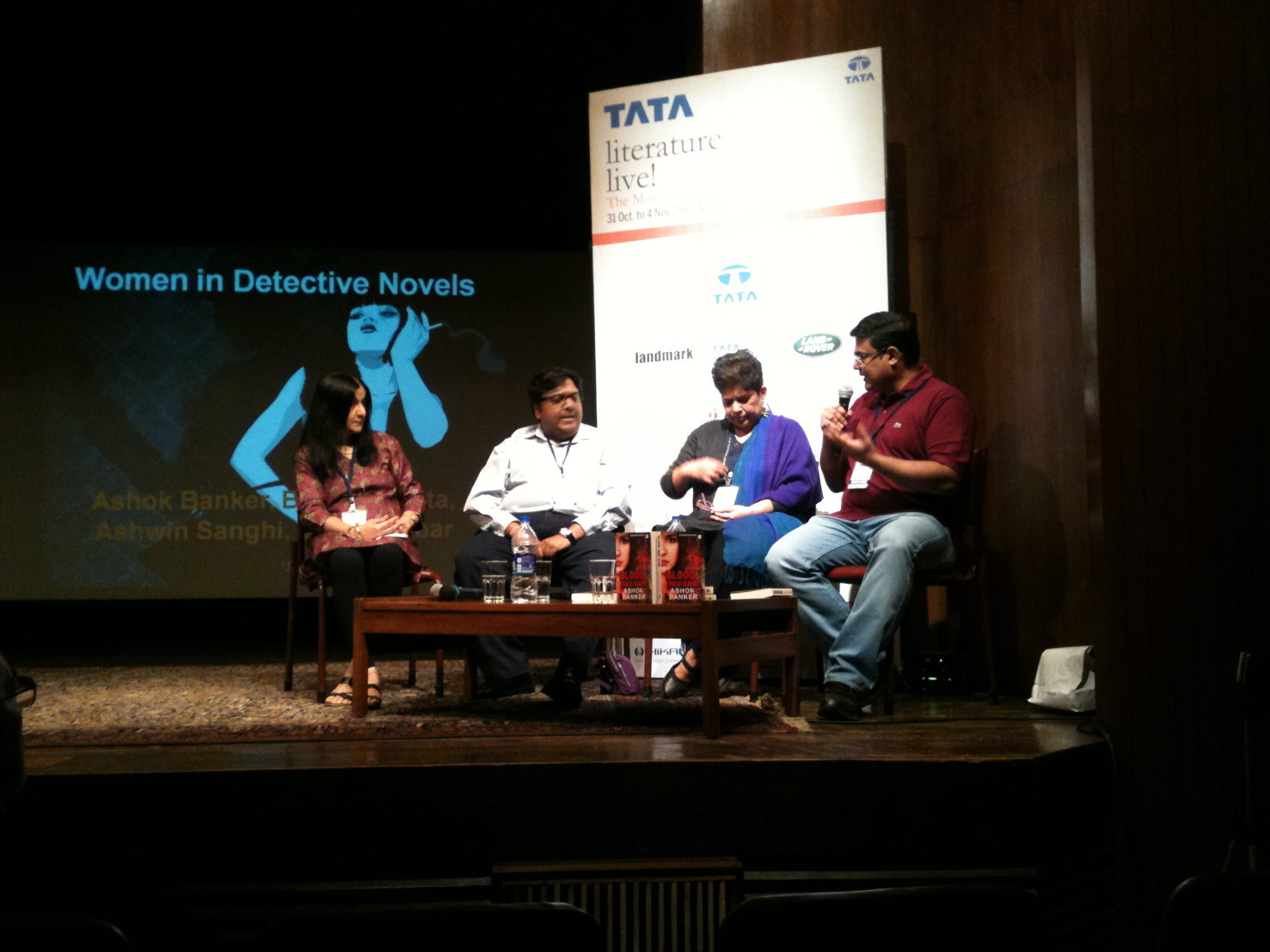
Banker (far right) at a panel discussion in November 2012

Banker has published in several genres, including crime thrillers. His Kali Rising books is a contemporary radical feminist thriller series featuring only women protagonists. The first book, Blood Red Sari, was launched at the Tata Literature Live! literary festival in Mumbai in November 2012.

=== Science fiction, fantasy and horror ===
His Gods of War was released by Penguin in 2009.

=== Autobiographical work ===
Three of his novels contain autobiographical elements and are closely related to one another. His novel Vertigo is about a man struggling to make a successful career and home life in Bombay. Byculla Boy takes its name from the suburb he and his mother grew up in. Beautiful Ugly is a tribute to his mother.

=== Mythological retellings ===
Banker is best known for his Ramayana Series, a freely imaginative retelling of the ancient Sanskrit epic poem. It has spawned the burgeoning mythology genre.

=== Television work ===
Banker has been credited as the creator and scriptwriter (story, screenplay and dialogues) for A Mouthful of Sky, India's first television series in English, originally aired on DD Metro in the Indian sub-continent, retelecast on Star World. He was also co-writer of Malaysia's television series in English, titled City of the Rich, produced by UTV. Writing sporadically for television from the mid-1980s onwards, Banker scripted over 520 episodes of broadcast television for various series.

=== Feature films ===
In June 2013, Disney UTV purchased the rights to Banker's ongoing Mahabharata Series, with Banker commissioned to adapt the epic for release in 2016/17. Disney India CEO Siddharth Roy Kapur was attached to produce and Director Abhishek Kapoor signed to direct the film. Banker has also confirmed that he has been commissioned by Rakeysh Omprakash Mehra to write the script for a forthcoming film.

=== Poetry ===
- Ashes in the Dust of Time (1979)

=== Literary fiction ===
- Vertigo (1993)
- Byculla Boy (1994)

=== Young adult novels ===
- Amazing Adventure at Chotta Sheher (1992)
- The Missing Parents Mystery (1994)
- Vortal Shockwave (2013)

=== Ramayana series ===
- Prince of Ayodhya (2003)
- Siege of Mithila (2003)
- Demons of Chitrakut (2004)
- Armies of Hanuman (2005)
- Bridge of Rama (2005)
- King of Ayodhya (2006)
- Vengeance of Ravana (2011)
- Sons of Sita (2012)
- Ramayana Series: The Complete Omnibus (2013) (Ebook only)
- "Prince of Ayodhya: Volume I, The Graphic Novel" (2010)

=== Collected as omnibus volumes ===
- Prince of Dharma (2007)
- Prince in Exile (2007)
- Prince at War (2007)
- King of Dharma (2011) (e-book only)

=== Krishna Coriolis series ===
- Slayer of Kamsa (2010)
- Dance of Govinda (2011)
- Flute of Vrindavan (2011)
- Lord of Mathura (2011)
- Rage of Jarasandha (2011)
- Fortress of Dwarka (2012)
- Rider of Garuda (2013)
- Lord of Vaikunta (2015)
- Krishna Coriolis: Complete Omnibus (2020)

=== Mahabharata series ===
Prequel Series

- The Forest of Stories (2011)
- The Seeds of War (2011)
- The Children of Midnight (2015)

Mahabharata Series

- The Darkness Before Dawn (2016)
- The Eclipse of Dharma (2016)
- The Sons of Misrule (2017)

=== Epic love stories ===
- Ganga and Shantanu (2013)
- Satyavati and Shantanu (2013)
- Shakuntala and Dushyanta (2013)
- Amba and Bhishma (2013)
- Devayani, Sharmistha and Yayati (2012)

=== Kali Rising ===
- Blood Red Sari (2012)
- Burnt Saffron Sky (2012) (Ebook only)
- Rust Black Heart (2013) (Ebook only)
- Silver Acid Rain (2013) (Ebook only)

=== Crime fiction ===
- The Iron Bra (1993)
- Murder & Champagne (1993)
- Ten Dead Admen (1993)

=== Itihasa series ===
- Ten Kings: Dasarajna (2012)
- ASHOKA: Lion of Maurya (2015)

=== Future history ===
- Gods of War (2009)
- Vengeance of Ravana (2009)
- VORTAL: Shockwave (2014)

=== Non-fiction books ===
- The Pocket Essential Bollywood (2001)
- The Valmiki Syndrome (2012)

=== Other works ===
- Gods of War (2009)
- A Mouthful of Sky – TV series created and written by Banker (1995–1996)
- City of the Rich – TV series co-written by Banker (1996–98), credited as Malaysia's first television series in English
- Bad Karma online serial (first published on Top Write Corner website) (1998)
- Brandwarriors magazine series published in The Advertising Brief, a now defunct ad magazine published by Mid-day Group (1999)
- Swing City (2000) book-length novel published as an online serial on Rediff.com
- Vortal (2000–2001) multimedia serial published in the CD-ROM magazine Mahazine
- Bombay Times, a novel, published by AKB, in 2009 about the rich society of Bombay

== See also ==
- List of Indian writers
