= Pyar Ki Dhun =

- Movie poster
- Directed by: Samarjit Dasgupta
- Written by: Shobha Dasgupta
- Produced by: Samarjit Dasgupta
- Cinematography: Pappu
- Edited by: Srinivas Patro
- Music by: Shantanu Moitra
- Production company: Magic Mantra Visons
- Release date: 26 April 2002
- Country: India
- Language: Hindi

Pyar Ki Dhun is a 2002 Indian Hindi-language romantic drama film directed and produced by Samarjit Dasgupta. It was produced under the banner of Magic Mantra Visons. The film was shot extensively in London, England, and partly in India, at Ranikhet (Uttaranchal) and Mumbai in 2001. The film stars Milind Soman, Swati, and Hena in the lead leads. The film was released on 26 April 2002 in India.

== Plot ==
Pyar Ki Dhun is about love and what it means to different people. Priya is a brilliant student from Ranikhet village who bags a scholarship to a university in the U.K. for further studies. She is a happy, ambitious girl from a traditional, loving family of modest means. She is engaged to Rohit, a handsome schoolteacher from the same village, who is very possessive about her. Much against Rohit’s wishes, she decides to pursue her dream of completing her further education abroad before the marriage. Nisha, on the other hand, is the bright daughter of a very rich Mumbai businessman, Mulkraj, but very unhappy in life as she misses a mother’s love and has to put up with her rude stepmother. On her stepmother’s insistence, she leaves India to complete her studies at the same U.K. college as Priya while she resides at the family’s London mansion along with the trusted family servant, Kuber. Priya and Nisha meet at the university and instantly become friends. Anita, daughter of Mr. and Mrs. Shah, a wealthy London-based Indian couple, also befriends them.

Nisha, quite lonely in a foreign country, gets unwittingly involved with NRI Mark, who is actually a drug dealer. Meanwhile, Rohit in India grows insecure and suspicious of Priya’s silences and flies off to London to check on her. He discovers that Priya now has second thoughts about their relationship and marriage. And Nisha, after some bad experiences with Mark, is drawn towards Rohit, who still yearns for Priya.

== Cast ==
- Milind Soman as Rohit
- Swati as Priya
- Hena as Nisha
- Prem Chopra as Mr. Mulkraj Anand
- Smita Jaykar as Mrs. Sakshi Mulkraj
- Saeed Jaffrey as Mr. Shah
- Satish Shah as Kuber
- Rajeev Verma as Priya's Father
- Bina Banerji as Priya's Mother
- Nirmal Pandey as Mark
- Naveen Beri as Naveen
- Nicolas as Nikhil
- Anita as Anita

== Music ==
The music of the film was composed by Shantanu Moitra, with lyrics by Javed Akhtar. The album consists of 7 songs.

No.	Name Of Song	Singer/s
1	"Meri In Aankhon Mein..."	Kavita Krishnamurthy & Abhijeet
2	"Bindiya Ka Rang Uda Jaye..."	Mahalakshmi Iyer
3	"Gum Sum Si Ho..."	Hariharan
4	"Yeh Saarey Din, Saari Ratein..."	Shankar Mahadevan
5	"Birhan ke Nain Jaley..."	Shubha Mudgal
6	"Ummeedein Dil Mein Machalti Hui..."	Hariharan
7	"Hum Hain Titliyan..."	Jaspinder Narula & Mahalaxmi
