= 13B (film) =

2009 Tamil language film

13B: Fear Has a New Address Yaavarum Nalam
- Theatrical release poster
- Directed by: Vikram K. Kumar
- Screenplay by: Vikram K. Kumar
- Dialogues by: Vikram K. Kumar (Tamil); Abhinav Kashyap (Hindi)
- Story by: Vikram K. Kumar
- Produced by: Rajesh Sawhney
- Starring: R. Madhavan; Neetu Chandra; Sachin Khedekar; Deepak Dobriyal; Murali Sharma; Ravi Babu
- Cinematography: P. C. Sreeram
- Edited by: Sreekar Prasad
- Music by: Songs: Shankar–Ehsaan–Loy; Background Score: Tubby–Parik
- Production company: Wide Angle Creations
- Distributed by: BIG Pictures
- Release date: 6 March 2009
- Running time: 142 minutes (Hindi version); 144 minutes (Tamil version)
- Country: India
- Languages: Hindi; Tamil
- Budget: ₹12 crore
- Box office: ₹23 crore

13B: Fear Has a New Address is a 2009 Indian horror thriller film written and directed by Vikram Kumar. The film stars R. Madhavan and Neetu Chandra. Produced by Suresh Balaje and George Pius, the film was simultaneously shot in Hindi and Tamil with the latter version titled Yavarum Nalam (transl. Everyone is well) with a slightly different cast. The Tamil version was also later dubbed into Telugu as 13-Padamoodu, featuring a few scenes reshot with Ravi Babu.

The film's soundtrack was composed by Shankar–Ehsaan–Loy, while Tubby-Parik provided the background score. Released on 6 March 2009, the film received mixed reviews but was commercially successful, and has since gained a cult following. Rediff placed the Tamil version of the film in its list of top films of 2009, while the American entertainment publication Collider considered it an original and one of the greatest Indian horror films of all time, praising its mixing elements of J-horror with a unique storyline.

A TV series with a similar theme called Dhootha written and directed by Vikram Kumar was released in 2023. Some have speculated that 13B and Dhootha exist in the same universe, while others have said that Dhootha is a standalone sequel to 13B.

== Plot ==
Manohar (nicknamed Manu) moves into a new apartment, numbered 13B, which is Apartment B on the 13th floor, with his family which consists of his mother, younger sister Divya, wife Priya, older brother Manoj, sister in law, nephew and niece. Strange incidents start happening in the house - milk curdling/spoiling every single day, only Manu’s face looking scarily blurry and twisted in the photos clicked on his phone camera, the family not being able to set up their Pooja room despite multiple attempts to do so - all of which are regarded as highly inauspicious. The lift in the building works for everyone in the building except Manu, which bothers him. A blind neighbour’s service dog refuses to enter Manu’s house and he tells Manu that his dog sounded very scared of Manu’s house.

The women of Manu’s family get hooked to a new TV serial, "Sab Khairiyat" / "Yavarum Nalam" ("Everyone is Well"), which plays automatically at 1 PM on channel 13. Even if the TV is not on at that time, the serial suddenly starts playing. The serial is about a family which is exactly like Manu’s, who have also moved into a new house. As the show progresses, Manu notices that the incidents happening in the serial happen to his family too, just after a few minutes or hours: his sister graduating with flying colours, his wife Priya getting pregnant and later suffering a miscarriage etc.,. Their longtime family friend and family doctor, Dr. Balram Shinde, also known as Dr. Balu / Dr. Shinde, saved Priya when she suffered a miscarriage, just as shown in the serial. Strangely, the rest of Manu’s family remains oblivious to the similarities between the TV serial and their lives. Manu is really scared and frustrated, so he goes to the set where the serial is shot, to inquire about it. To his horror, he discovers that Yavarum Nalam / Sab Khairiyat is a reality show with a completely different theme, and has got nothing to do with the serial. He discovers that the serial that his family watches appears only in his house’s TV, every day, at 1:00 PM (13:00 hours).

Manu, that night, finds out from Priya that in the serial, the family’s blind neighbour’s dog digs up a place near their house. After everyone falls asleep, Manu goes to a spot in the sandpit in the children’s play area on the ground floor, which he saw his blind neighbour’s dog dig up that afternoon. He continues to dig further and finds an old photo album with photographs of the family from the serial, where he also sees a man he does not recognise (it is revealed at the end that the man was Ashok/Senthil). He then finds out a terrifying secret: the apartment they live in has the same number as a house where a family of eight was brutally murdered in 1977, and that the house was in the exact same place where Manu’s building stands today. It was the family of a popular and beautiful Doordarshan news anchor, Chitra. It is then shown through a flashback that on the day of Chitra's engagement, an ardent fan, named Sairam, attempted to stop the engagement because he was obsessed with her. When he was told to go away by Chitra’s older brothers, he left but warned that he would kill everyone in the family and chop them into pieces. But, unable to do anything, he killed himself the very next morning. Then, all members of Chitra's family (including Chitra) were murdered with a hammer on the same day as Sairam's suicide. The blame was somehow put on the mentally ill brother Senthil / Ashok in the family, as he had been seen with the hammer last. The investigating police officer, Eeshwar/Ilangovan, who was working on the case seemingly committed suicide by hanging himself in the same house, a few days later.

Manu, along with his police Inspector friend Shiva, meets Chitra's former fiancé, Ramachandran / Ram Charan, a High Court lawyer who tried to plead for Senthil / Ashok's innocence. Later, they also meet Senthil / Ashok at a mental asylum who violently attacks them.

That night, Manu has a nightmare of a murderer climbing the stairs to kill his family and wakes up with a start. As he is recovering from the nightmare, he hears the TV in their drawing room suddenly starting on its own. He goes out and sees the climax episode of Yavarum Nalam / Sab Khairiyat where they are showing the murderer's identity, which is actually a continuation of the nightmare Manu just had, and Manu’s face is shown as the killer.

Horrified and not wanting to risk his family's life, he feels like he’s going insane and runs to Dr.Balu/Shinde's house along with Shiva and tells him to book plane tickets and send his family members somewhere without telling him, so they would be safe. At Dr. Balu/Shinde's house, Manu requests to be locked up in a room, to prevent him from harming his family. While locked up in one of the rooms of Dr. Shinde’s house, he suddenly spots a hammer similar to the one he saw on his TV, in the garden, and suddenly realises that there were two people with two different hammers - the person who murders the family in the serial’s climax episode has a regular hammer in his hand but in his nightmare, Manu had a sledge hammer in his hand. The sledge hammer was the exact one he saw in Dr. Shinde’s garden.

Dr. Balu / Dr. Shinde arrives at Manu’s home at around 12.30 AM, during a heavy thunderstorm and power outage, and gives the flight tickets to Manu’s wife, who is extremely confused and scared. Suddenly, the television gets turned on and he sees Chitra's spirit in the TV, which starts to talk to him. It is then revealed that the person who murdered the whole family in 1977 was Dr. Balu / Dr. Shinde, who was very young back then. He killed the whole family of Chitra in July 1977, after the suicide of Sairam, the ardent fan who was also his beloved younger brother. Dr. Shinde also killed the investigating police officer who had found evidence that could lead to him, and hung his body from the fan of the murder house, making it look like a suicide.

Chitra’s spirit claims that Dr.Balu/Dr. Shinde has to be killed in the same place where he had killed her family, and that her brother Ashok/Senthil must be proven innocent and released, and that their family’s spirits will leave earth peacefully only if that happens.

This triggers hallucinations of Chitra and her family in the form of Manu’s family for Dr.Balu/Shinde. He turns psychotic and starts attacking all of the members in the house with a small hammer he finds in their living room, and Manu arrives at the right time to save them. Manu kills Dr.Balu / Shinde with the sledge hammer and this is what his nightmare and the climax episode had shown earlier: Manu was innocent, and he was holding the sledge hammer to kill the real culprit Dr. Shinde/ Balu.

The extremely angry and unsatisfied spirits of Chitra, her mother, 2 older brothers, sisters in law, nephew and niece - the 8 people who were murdered by Dr. Shinde that day in 1977 - were still lurking in the house numbered 13B, waiting for an opportunity to get revenge on Dr. Shinde and give justice to Chitra’s mentally challenged older brother Ashok/Senthil. They used to keep him locked in a room of their house because he would turn violent suddenly. When the murders happened, he was locked in his room but heard the horrible cries and managed to somehow escape from the room. But it was too late because his whole family had been murdered by then. He grieves by hugging the dead bodies of his family members and ends up getting blood stains all over himself. He knows and understands what has happened and feels devastated. He believes that the TV (because of which Sairam saw Chitra) is the sole reason for this tragedy. Then he sees the bloodstained sledge hammer (the murder weapon, which Dr. Shinde had forgotten at the crime scene) and starts to angrily break the TV with the hammer, and that is the exact moment when the police walks in and believe that he was the one who killed his family members, and detains him. The dead family had been waiting for 30 years to get revenge and when a family exactly like theirs moved into apartment number 13B, similar to their bungalow number 13B, the spirits decided to use them for help. Manohar was the only one who was intelligent enough to notice the details and pick up hints, so they hung onto him with hope and even guided him indirectly to achieve what they wanted.

The story ends with Manohar finally living a normal life with his family. They bring Ashok/Senthil home, and the apartment's lift finally works for Manohar, while Priya becomes pregnant again. They finally live happily.

However, when Manu takes the lift the next morning, he receives a call from Dr.Balu / Shinde, which he answers hesitantly and afraidly, saying that while the family had haunted the TV, he now haunts Manohar's phone. As the call ends, the elevator comes to a sudden halt and the screen blacks out.

== Cast ==
- R. Madhavan as R. Manohar aka Mano
- Neetu Chandra as Priya, Manohar's wife
- Murali Sharma (Hindi) / Ravi Babu (Tamil, Telugu) as Inspector Shiva
- Sachin Khedekar as Dr. Shinde (Hindi) / Dr. Balu (Tamil)
- Sanjaiah Bokaria as R. Manoj, Manohar's elder brother
- Amitha Rajan as Deepa, Manoj's wife (voice dubbed in Hindi by Balvinder Kaur)
- Poonam Dhillon (Hindi) as Sushma, Manohar's mother
  - Saranya Ponvannan (Tamil) as Shanthi, Manohar's mother
- Dhritiman Chatterjee as Mr. Kamdhar (Hindi) / Mr. Thyagrajan (Tamil)
- Deepak Dobriyal as Ashok (Hindi) / Senthil (Tamil)
- Sampath Raj as Advocate Ram Charan (Hindi) / Advocate Ramachandran (Tamil)
- Roshan Abbas (Hindi) / Khushbu (Tamil) as Show Host
- Rohini as TV Reporter
- Amar Upadhyay (Hindi) / S. N. Vasanth (Tamil) as Mohan
- Suhasini Mulay as Mohan's mother (Hindi)
- Meera Vasudevan as Chitra, Doordarshan newsreader (Hindi) / Damal Shrividhya as Chithra (Tamil)
- Iswar Srikumar as Inspector Eashwar Gandhre (Hindi) (voice dubbed by Mayur Vyas)
  - Sampath Ram (Tamil) as Inspector Ilangovan
- Rachana Maurya (special appearance)

== Soundtrack ==
The film's music was composed by Shankar–Ehsaan–Loy, while the lyrics in Hindi and Tamil were penned by Neelesh Mishra and Thamarai respectively.

Yaavarum Nalam/13B

Soundtrack album by Shankar–Ehsaan–Loy
- Released: 6 February 2009
- Recorded: 2008
- Genre: Feature film soundtrack
- Length: 39:33
- Languages: Hindi; Tamil
- Labels: Big Music; T-Series
- Producer: Shankar–Ehsaan–Loy

Shankar–Ehsaan–Loy chronology
| Short Kut (2009) | Yaavarum Nalam/13B (2009) | Sikandar (2009) |

=== Hindi ===
| No. | Title | Artist(s) | Length |
|---|---|---|---|
| 1. | "Sab Khairiyat Hai" | Shankar Mahadevan | 1:46 |
| 2. | "Bade Se Shehar Mein" | Karthik, Shankar Mahadevan | 4:30 |
| 3. | "Oh Sexy Mama" | Anushka Manchanda, Baba Sehgal, Loy Mendonsa | 4:06 |
| 4. | "13 B" (Theme) | | 4:57 |
| 5. | "Aasma Odhkar" | K. S. Chitra, Shankar Mahadevan | 4:25 |
| 6. | "Sab Khairiyat Hai" (Remix) | Shankar Mahadevan | 4:04 |
| 7. | "Aasma Odhkar" (Remix) | K. S. Chitra, Shankar Mahadevan | 6:04 |
| 8. | "Oh Crazy Mama" | Akriti Kakkar, Hrishikesh Kamerkar, Rajiv Sunderasan, Anushka Manchanda, Baba Sehgal, Loy Mendonsa | 4:37 |
| 9. | "Bade Se Shehar Mein" (Remix) | Karthik | 5:08 |

=== Tamil ===
| No. | Title | Artist(s) | Length |
|---|---|---|---|
| 1. | "Chinnakkuyil Koovam" | Karthik | 4:30 |
| 2. | "Yavarum Nalam" | Shankar Mahadevan | 1:46 |
| 3. | "Oh Sexy Mama" | Anuradha Sriram, Jassie Gift | 4:06 |
| 4. | "Yavarum Nalam" (Theme) | | 4:57 |
| 5. | "Kaatrilae Vaasame" | K. S. Chitra, Shankar Mahadevan | 4:25 |
| 6. | "Yaavarum Nalam" (Remix) | Shankar Mahadevan | 4:04 |
| 7. | "Kaatrilae Vaasame" (Remix) | K. S. Chitra, Shankar Mahadevan | 6:04 |
| 8. | "Oh Sexy Mama" (Remix) | Anuradha Sriram, Jassie Gift | 4:37 |
| 9. | "Chinnakkuyil Koovam" (Remix) | Karthik | 5:08 |

== Release ==
=== Reception ===
The film received mixed reviews from critics. On the review aggregator website Rotten Tomatoes, 83% of 6 critics' reviews are positive, with an average rating of 5/10.

==== 13B ====
Times of India gave the movie a 3.5/5 rating and said, "Watch out for some zippy cinematography, a stylized monochrome tint, and some snazzy editing. Great timepass. Go for it."

Idlebrain.com gave it 2.5 out of 5 stars and stated, "The first half of the film is a little boring. The way the story unfolds in the second half is good. But the flashback episode and the climax is not shot in a gripping manner. The plus points of the film are the story, cinematography, and Madhavan. The negative points are inconsistent screenplay and runtime. Though it has an interesting plot point, 13B fails due to lack of gripping narration." Rajeev Masand rated the film 2 out of 5 stars and wrote, "13B is the kind of convenient thriller where you do get a twist ending, but the kind in which anything goes. The logic behind the twist and the back-story to the supernatural premise is so convoluted, it's hardly clever."

Hindustan Times gave the movie 2 out of 5 stars and stated, "If you like horror films, this one's par for the course, especially in the first half, where Vikram K Kumar uses the TV set for an interesting premise, the actors do their bit and the camera picks up suitably weird angles." Rediff.com rated the film 2 out of 5 stars and said, "One simply wishes it didn't have to be such hard work getting to the point, for the filmmakers as well as the audience."

Taran Adarsh of Bollywood Hungama gave the film 1.5 out of 5 stars and said that "On the whole, 13B is interesting in parts, not in entirety."

Shubhra Gupta of The Indian Express said, "Forget the irritating item numbers. Stay with the film, and you will come to a smart little end, and leave half-smiling, half-wondering: is this what the future holds?" Film Journal International wrote in their review, "J-horror-styled supernatural thriller from India doesn't have the gore or intensity of the real thing, and for many in the mainstream, that's a relief. Low-budget-looking but effective, with a great central gimmick."

==== Yavarum Nalam ====
Bhama Devi Rani of The Times of India gave the film 3 out of 5 stars and wrote, "It is a neat entertainer without amateurish spook props. This is one goose bumps date you would want to keep".

=== Box office ===
The Hindi version grossed only ₹10 crore and was a commercial failure, according to Box Office India. The Tamil version was a hit, grossing around ₹13 crore.

== See also ==
- List of ghost films
