= A Mouthful of Sky =

Indian television series

- Written by: Ashok Banker
- Directed by: Mahesh Bhatt; Anant Balani; Ajay Goel; Rohit Kaushik
- Country of origin: India
- Original language: English
- No. of episodes: 252

Original release
- Network: DD National
- Release: 1995 – 1996

A Mouthful of Sky is an Indian television series which aired in 1995 on DD National. It was the first serial in English to be produced in India. Aired on DD National and based on the script by Ashok Banker, the serial deals with the lives, loves, ideals and aspirations of the post-independence generation of Indians, people in their mid-thirties who straddle the twin worlds of conventional Indian society as well as the urban westernized ethos.

== Plot ==
The basic story is about five MBAs who reunite 13 years after graduation to confront a macabre secret from the past which a group of ruthless enemies use to try to destroy them. Woven into this crime-thriller structure are sub-plots dealing with urban Indians from various communities and their struggle to mix the inherent contradictions of their Indianness with their westernized outlook and language.

== Cast ==
- Rahul Bose as Pavan Sarkar
- Kruttika Desai as Vinita
- Milind Soman as Akash Bhandarkar
- Samir Soni as Ashok Mathur
- Neesha Singh as Varsha
- Shiuli Subaya as Shama
- Divya Seth
- Mukul Dev as Piyush Raheja
- Shivaji Satam as Akash's father
- Ayesha Dharker
- Simone Singh as Madhulika
- Soni Razdan
- R. Madhavan
- Arjun Rampal
- Ranjeev Mulchandani as Prithvi Raheja
- Kushal Punjabi
