= Akeli (film) =

- Directed by: Vinod Pande
- Produced by: Vinod Pande
- Starring: R. Madhavan; Nandini Ghosal; Anupam Shyam
- Cinematography: Sudhir Gowda
- Edited by: Bobby Bose
- Music by: Jeetu-Tapan; Nilesh Bhatia
- Production company: Cine Images Production
- Release date: 22 August 2014 (YouTube release)
- Running time: 165 mins
- Country: India
- Language: Hindi

Akeli is a 2014 Hindi film produced, written, and directed by Vinod Pande. The film featured R. Madhavan in his first full-length role in a Hindi film, alongside Danseuse Nandini Ghosal and Anupam Shyam. Despite being completed and censored in August 1999, the film remained unreleased before the makers chose to release it via YouTube in August 2014.

== Cast ==
- R. Madhavan as Avinash
- Nandini Ghoshal as Meera
- Anupam Shyam as MLA Pathare
- Sujata Sanghamitra as Rosie
- Prerna Agarwal as Ameeta
- Asha Sharma as Meera's mother
- Aashish Kaul as Rohit
- Raj Kiran as Avinash's first boss
- Vinod Pande as Avinash's boss
- Brij Gopal as Railway constable
- Shakti Singh as Pawar
- Abha Parmar as Meera's sister-in-law
- Chandra Mohan as Meera's brother
- Vipin Kansal as Ravi
- Rakesh Shrivastava as Mishraji
- Jharna Dave as Pratibha
- Kailash Kaushik as D K
- Raj Joshi as Rohit's father
- Suman Pednekar as Laxmibai, Meera's maid
- Chaitanya as Ranjan
- Samina as Rajjo
- Ritwika Dey as Guesthouse landlady
- Sheela Mishra as Rohit's mother
- Murali Sharma as Meera's boss
- Shahnaaz Dhillon as woman outside telephone booth
- Ramprakash Arora as Rohit's uncle
- Sunil Kumar Singh as pandit in wedding
- Nimai Das as Pathare's driver
- Snehal Vilankar as receptionist
- Tanvir Siddique as Damle

== Production ==
The project materialised in late 1997, with R. Madhavan agreeing to make his acting debut in Hindi films with the project. He signed the film while he was shooting for the Kannada venture, Shanti Shanti Shanti (1998), as well as a series of television dramas. Danceuse Nandini Gopal was selected to play the leading female role, while Anupam Shyam was picked to play another supporting role. The film was censored on 10 August 1999, but was unable to find a distributor for a theatrical release. In 2000, a corporate group considered purchasing the first copy of the film, but Vinod Pande decided to delay the venture until Madhavan's Rehnaa Hai Terre Dil Mein (2001) was released. The film then geared up for release in 2002 through Yash Raj Films, but plans were suddenly cancelled at the final moment and the project remained indefinitely on hold.

== Release ==
In 2014, Vinod Pande chose to release the film directly on to YouTube citing he did not want the film to get "lost", and that another of his unreleased films, Chaloo Movie, had found itself online illegally. It was later played at the Festival du Film d'Asie du Sud Transgressif in France in February 2015, with Vinod Pande in attendance.
