= Pradeep Kumar Sreedharan =

Indian swimming coach

- Born: Pradeep Kumar Sreedharan; June 1, 1963 (age 61); Palode, Kerala
- Occupation(s): National Swimming Coach of India, CEO and Head Coach of Aqua Nation Sports Academy, Dubai, Member of FINA coaches committee (2019-2022)
- Spouse: Gowri Pradeep
- Awards: Dronacharya Award

Pradeep Kumar Sreedharan (born 1 June 1963) is the National Swimming Coach of India. He was awarded the Dronacharya award in 2016 by President of India.

He had coached swimming team for four olympics Beijing 2008, London 2012, Rio 2016 and Tokyo 2021. He was coach of four Asian games Doha 2006, Guanghou 2010, Incheon 2014, Jakarta 2018. He was Coach of four Commonwealth games Melbourne 2006, Delhi 2010, Glasgow 2014 and Gold Coast 2018.

Pradeep Kumar Sreedharan was appointed as the National Swimming coach of India by Government of Indian in 2005 and he is serving till now. He is also the member of FINA coaches committee from 2019 to 2022.

Pradeep had coached more than 4000 competitive swimmers since 1988 including some of the names like Nisha Millet, Rehan Poncha, Gagan Ullalmath and Sajan Prakash. He was picked by International Olympic Committee to train 46 Pakistani coaches.
