= Sea Hawks (TV series) =

- Written by: Anubhav Sinha; Anirudhya Mitra
- Directed by: Anubhav Sinha; Shivam Nair
- Original language: Hindi
- No. of seasons: 1
- No. of episodes: 104

Production
- Producer: Anirudhya Mitra
- Running time: 22 - 30 minutes
- Production company: UTV

Original release
- Network: DD Metro

Sea Hawks is an Indian television series that aired on DD Metro in the 1997-98. The story was based on the life and times of the Indian Coast Guard officers. The series stars Om Puri, R. Madhavan, Niki Aneja, Leelawar Tendulkar, Anup Soni, Simone Singh, Manoj Pahwa, Milind Soman and others. It was directed by Anubhav Sinha and produced by Anirudhya Mitra of UTV. Later, it was directed by Shivam Nair while Anirudhya Mitra took up the writing of the show. The series aired again in 2001 on DD Metro, 2002 on Star Plus, 2007 on Bindass It was produced by UTV.

The plot revolves around the activities of a mafia don's network, the coast guard, and the police and includes underwater and action sequences.

== Cast ==
- Anup Soni as ACP Kumar
- Simone Singh as Rupal, Kumar's wife
- R. Madhavan as Deputy Commandant Preet
- Niki Aneja as Dr Natasha
- Manoj Pahwa as Mafia kingpin Dev Bhamra
- Om Puri as Uncle Sam
- Milind Soman as Commandant Vikram Rajpoot
- Vineet Kumar
- Akhil Mishra Navy Officer and a Father figure to Commandant Preet
- Leelawar Tendulkar
