= Yule Love Story =

- Country of origin: India
- No. of seasons: 1
- No. of episodes: Total 53

Production
- Running time: Approx. 24 minutes

Original release
- Network: Zee TV
- Release: 5 April 1993 – 18 April 1994

Yule Love Story is a drama series aired on Zee TV from 1993 to 1994. In every episode a new story was shown, which was a typical love story revolving around relation between teens. This series was succeeded by another series called Rishtey that involves all the human relationship not just love between couples. The series was sponsored by Yule Tea Group.
