= 11th South Indian International Movie Awards =

2023 award ceremony in Dubai

- Awarded for: Excellence in South Indian cinema
- Date: 15 –16 September 2023
- Site: Dubai World Trade Centre, Dubai, United Arab Emirates
- Hosted by: Akul Balaji; Anupama Gowda; Kavya Kalyanram; Govind Padmasoorya; Pavithra Lakshmi; Priyadarshi; Sathish; Shilpa Bala
- Organized by: Vibri Media Group

Highlights
- Best Film: Telugu – Sita Ramam; Tamil – Ponniyin Selvan: I Kannada – 777 Charlie; Malayalam – Nna Thaan Case Kodu
- Most awards: Kantara (8)
- Most nominations: Kantara, KGF: Chapter 2 and RRR (11)

Television coverage
- Channel: Gemini TV (Telugu); Sun TV (Tamil); Surya TV (Malayalam); Udaya TV (Kannada)
- Network: Sun TV Network

The 11th South Indian International Movie Awards is an awards event that took place at the Dubai World Trade Centre in Dubai, United Arab Emirates, on 15–16 September 2023. The ceremony (11th SIIMA) recognized and honored the best films and performances from Telugu, Tamil, Malayalam and Kannada films and music released in 2022, along with special honours for lifetime contributions and a few special awards.

On the first day of the ceremony (15 September 2023) awarded the best films and performances from the Telugu and Kannada cinema, whereas on the second day (16 September 2023), the best films and performances from the Tamil and Malayalam cinema were awarded.

Kantara won eight awards from eleven nominations, thus becoming the most awarded and most nominated film. RRR and Vikram have five wins each, from eleven and nine nominations respectively, thus became the second most awarded films. Ponniyin Selvan: I and Nna Thaan Case Kodu stand at third position with four wins each. RRR is the most awarded and nominated Telugu film. Vikram is the most awarded, whereas Ponniyin Selvan I is the most nominated Tamil film respectively. Kantara is the most awarded and nominated Kannada film. Nna Thaan Case Kodu is the most awarded, whereas Bheeshma Parvam is the most nominated Malayalam film.

Mrunal Thakur, Kamal Haasan, Rishab Shetty and Vineeth Sreenivasan are the most awarded individuals with two wins each. Thakur won Best Female Debut – Telugu and Critics Best Actress – Telugu awards, thus becoming the most awarded individual in Telugu. Hassan won Best Actor – Tamil and Best Male Playback Singer – Tamil awards, thus becoming the most awarded individual in Tamil. Shetty won Best Director – Kannada and Critics Best Actor – Kannada awards, thus becoming the most awarded individual in Kannada. Vineeth won Best Director – Malayalam and Best Actor in a Negative Role – Malayalam awards, thus becoming the most awarded individual in Malayalam.

C. Aswani Dutt is the oldest winner, whereas Sreeleela is the youngest winner.

== Main awards and nominees ==
Winners are listed first, highlighted in boldface.

=== Film ===
Best Film
Telugu	Tamil
**Sita Ramam – Vyjayanthi Movies, Swapna Cinema**; DJ Tillu – Sithara Entertainments; Karthikeya 2 – Abhishek Agarwal Arts, People Media Factory; Major – G. Mahesh Babu Entertainment, Sony Pictures International Productions, A+S Movies; RRR – DVV Entertainment	**Ponniyin Selvan: I – Madras Talkies, Lyca Productions**; Love Today – AGS Entertainment; Rocketry: The Nambi Effect – Tricolour Films, Varghese Moolan Pictures, 27th Entertainment; Thiruchitrambalam – Sun Pictures; Vikram – Raaj Kamal Films International
Kannada	Malayalam
**777 Charlie – Paramvah Studios**; KGF: Chapter 2 – Hombale Films; Love Mocktail 2 – Krishna Talkies; Kantara – Hombale Films; Vikrant Rona – Kichcha Creations, Shalini Arts, Invenio Origin	**Nna Thaan Case Kodu – Kunchacko Boban Productions, Udaya Picture**; Bheeshma Parvam – Amal Neerad Productions; Hridayam – Merryland Cinemas, Big Bang Entertainments; Jaya Jaya Jaya Jaya Hey – Cheers Entertainments; Jana Gana Mana – Prithviraj Productions, Magic Frames; Thallumaala – Ashiq Usman Productions
Best Director
Telugu	Tamil
**S. S. Rajamouli – RRR**; Chandoo Mondeti – Karthikeya 2; Hanu Raghavapudi – Sita Ramam; Sashi Kiran Tikka – Major; Vimal Krishna – DJ Tillu	**Lokesh Kanagaraj – Vikram**; Gautham Ramachandran – Gargi; M. Manikandan – Kadaisi Vivasayi; Mani Ratnam – Ponniyin Selvan: I; Mithran R. Jawahar – Thiruchitrambalam
Kannada	Malayalam
**Rishab Shetty – Kantara**; Anup Bhandari – Vikrant Rona; Krishna – Love Mocktail 2; Kiranraj K. – 777 Charlie; Prashanth Neel – KGF: Chapter 2	**Vineeth Srinivasan – Hridayam**; Mahesh Narayanan – Ariyippu; Khalid Rahman – Thallumaala; Amal Neerad – Bheeshma Parvam; Tharun Moorthy – Saudi Vellakka
Best Cinematographer
Telugu	Tamil
**K. K. Senthil Kumar – RRR**; Chota K. Naidu – Bimbisara; Karthik Gattamneni – Karthikeya 2; P. S. Vinod – Sita Ramam; Vamsi Patchipulusu – Major	**Ravi Varman – Ponniyin Selvan: I**; Arthur A. Wilson – Iravin Nizhal; Girish Gangadharan – Vikram; Siddhartha Nuni – Vendhu Thanindhathu Kaadu; Vidhu Ayyanna – Nitham Oru Vaanam
Kannada	Malayalam
**Bhuvan Gowda – KGF: Chapter 2**; Arvind S. Kashyap – Kantara; Mahendra Simha – Ek Love Ya; Santhosh Rai Pathaje – Gaalipata 2; William David – Vikrant Rona	**Sharan Velayudhan – Saudi Vellakka**; Anend C. Chandran – Bheeshma Parvam; Jimshi Khalid Thallumaala; Nimish Ravi – Rorschach; Manesh Madhavan – Ela Veezha Poonchira

=== Acting ===
Best Actor
Telugu	Tamil
**N. T. Rama Rao Jr. – RRR**; Adivi Sesh – Major; Dulquer Salmaan – Sita Ramam; Nikhil Siddhartha – Karthikeya 2; Ram Charan – RRR; Siddhu Jonnalagadda – DJ Tillu	**Kamal Haasan – Vikram**; Dhanush – Thiruchitrambalam; Madhavan – Rocketry: The Nambi Effect; Silambarasan – Vendhu Thanindhathu Kaadu; Vikram – Mahaan and Ponniyin Selvan: I
Kannada	Malayalam
**Yash – KGF: Chapter 2**; Puneeth Rajkumar – James; Rakshit Shetty – 777 Charlie; Rishab Shetty – Kantara; Shiva Rajkumar – Vedha; Sudeepa – Vikrant Rona	**Tovino Thomas – Thallumaala**; Basil Joseph – Jaya Jaya Jaya Jaya Hey; Kunchacko Boban – Nna Thaan Case Kodu; Mammootty – Bheeshma Parvam; Nivin Pauly – Padavettu; Prithviraj Sukumaran – Jana Gana Mana
Best Actress
Telugu	Tamil
**Sreeleela – Dhamaka**; Meenakshi Chaudhary – HIT: The Second Case; Mrunal Thakur – Sita Ramam; Neha Shetty – DJ Tillu; Nithya Menen – Bheemla Nayak; Samantha – Yashoda	**Trisha – Ponniyin Selvan: I**; Aishwarya Lekshmi – Gatta Kusthi; Dushara Vijayan – Natchathiram Nagargiradhu; Keerthy Suresh – Saani Kaayidham; Nithya Menen – Thiruchitrambalam; Sai Pallavi – Gargi
Kannada	Malayalam
**Srinidhi Shetty – KGF: Chapter 2**; Ashika Ranganath – Raymo; Sapthami Gowda – Kantara; Rachita Ram – Monsoon Raaga; Sharmila Mandre – Gaalipata 2; Chaithra J. Achar – Gilky	**Kalyani Priyadarshan – Bro Daddy**; Anaswara Rajan – Super Sharanya; Darshana Rajendran – Jaya Jaya Jaya Jaya Hey; Revathi – Bhoothakalam; Navya Nair – Oruthee; Keerthy Suresh –Vaashi
Best Actor in a Supporting Role
Telugu	Tamil
**Rana Daggubati – Bheemla Nayak**; Muralidhar Goud – DJ Tillu; Naresh – Ante Sundaraniki; Rao Ramesh – Dhamaka; Sumanth – Sita Ramam	**Kaali Venkat – Gargi**; Bharathiraja – Thiruchitrambalam; Dhruv Vikram – Mahaan; Kalaiyarasan – Natchathiram Nagargiradhu; Lal – Taanakkaran
Kannada	Malayalam
**Diganth – Gaalipata 2**; Kishore – Kantara; Achyuth Kumar – KGF: Chapter 2; Rangayana Raghu – James; Raj B. Shetty – 777 Charlie	**Lal – Mahaveeryar**; Roshan Mathew – Oru Thekkan Thallu Case; Jaffar Idukki – Kooman; Jagadeesh – Rorschach; Manoj K. Jayan – Salute
Best Actress in a Supporting Role
Telugu	Tamil
**Sangeetha – Masooda**; Amala Akkineni – Oke Oka Jeevitham; Priyamani – Virata Parvam; Samyuktha Menon – Bheemla Nayak; Sobhita Dhulipala – Major	**Vasanthi – Vikram**; Kovai Sarala – Sembi; Raveena Ravi – Love Today; Simran – Rocketry: The Nambi Effect; Urvashi – Veetla Vishesham
Kannada	Malayalam
**Shubha Raksha** – **Home Minister**; Aditi Sagar – Vedha; Karunya Ram – Petromax; Sakshi Meghana – Lisa; Sharmitha Gowda – Family Pack	**Bindu Panicker – Rorschach**; Mamitha Baiju – Super Sharanya; Asha Sharath – Paappan; Aarsha Chandini Baiju – Mukundan Unni Associates; Pauly Valsan – Appan
Best Actor in a Negative Role
Telugu	Tamil
**Suhas – HIT: The Second Case**; Jayaram – Dhamaka; Samuthirakani – Sarkaru Vaari Paata; Satyadev – Godfather; Unni Mukundan – Yashoda	**S. J. Suryah – Don**; Arav – Kalaga Thalaivan; Kartikeya Gummakonda – Valimai; Vijay Sethupathi – Vikram; Vinay Rai – Etharkkum Thunindhavan
Kannada	Malayalam
**Achyuth Kumar – Kantara**; Apurva Kasaravalli – Guru Shishyaru; Srikanth – James; Nirup Bhandari – Vikrant Rona; Sanjay Dutt – KGF: Chapter 2	**Vineeth Sreenivasan – Mukundan Unni Associates**; Vivek Oberoi – Kaduva; Alencier Ley Lopez – Appan; Shine Tom Chacko – Kumari; Sudev Nair – Bheeshma Parvam
Best Comedian
Telugu	Tamil
**Srinivasa Reddy – Karthikeya 2**; Brahmaji – Like, Share & Subscribe; Rajendra Prasad – F3: Fun and Frustration; Rajkumar Kasireddy – Ashoka Vanamlo Arjuna Kalyanam; Vennela Kishore – Sarkaru Vaari Paata	**Yogi Babu – Love Today**; Harish Kumar – Gulu Gulu; Karunas – Gatta Kusthi; Soori – Don; VTV Ganesh – Beast
Kannada	Malayalam
**Prakash Thuminad – Kantara**; Chikkanna – Trivikrama; Kuri Prathap – Triple Riding; Nagabhushana – Lucky Man; Sadhu Kokila – Avatara Purusha	**Rajesh Madhavan – Nna Thaan Case Kodu**; Azees Nedumangad – Jaya Jaya Jaya Jaya Hey; Johny Antony – Hridayam; Pramod Velijanad– Mahaveeryar; Shammi Thilakan – Palthu Janwar

=== Debut ===
Best Debut Actor
Telugu	Tamil
**Ashok Galla –** **Hero**; Ashish Reddy – Rowdy Boys; Bellamkonda Ganesh – Swathi Muthyam; Harsh Kanumilli – Sehari; Srikanth Reddy – First Day First Show	**Pradeep Ranganathan – Love Today**; Legend Saravanan – The Legend; Kishen Das – Mudhal Nee Mudivum Nee; Selvaraghavan – Saani Kaayidham; Nallandi – Kadaisi Vivasayi
Kannada	Malayalam
**Pruthvi Shamanur – Padavi Poorva**; Dheeren Ramkumar – Shiva 143; Karthik Mahesh – Dollu; Madhusudhan Govind – Made in Bengaluru; Vikram Ravichandran – Trivikrama; Zaid Khan – Banaras	**Ranjith Sajeev – Mike**; Arjun Radhakrishnan – Pada; Kalesh Ramanand – Hridayam; P. P. Kunhikrishnan – Nna Thaan Case Kodu; Swathi Das Prabhu – Thallumaala
Best Debut Actress
Telugu	Tamil
**Mrunal Thakur – Sita Ramam**; Saiee Manjrekar – Ghani; Mithila Palkar – Ori Devuda; Shirley Setia – Krishna Vrinda Vihari; Ritika Nayak – Ashoka Vanamlo Arjuna Kalyanam	**Aditi Shankar – Viruman**; Anukreethy Vas – DSP; Meetha Raghunath – Mudhal Nee Mudivum Nee; Brigida Saga – Iravin Nizhal; Siddhi Idnani – Vendhu Thanindhathu Kaadu
Kannada	Malayalam
**Neetha Ashok – Vikrant Rona**; Anjali Anish – Padavi Poorva; Nidhi Hegde – Dollu; Rachana Inder – Love 360; Reeshma Nanaiah – Ek Love Ya; Megha Shetty – Triple Riding	**Gayathrie Shankar – Nna Thaan Case Kodu**; Devi Varma – Saudi Vellakka; Kayadu Lohar – Pathonpatham Noottandu; Shanvi Srivastava – Mahaveeryar; Radhika Radhakrishnan – Appan
Best Debut Director
Telugu	Tamil
**Mallidi Vassishta** **– Bimbisara**; Sai Kiran – Masooda; Shree Karthick – Oke Oka Jeevitham; Vidya Sagar – Ashoka Vanamlo Arjuna Kalyanam; Vimal Krishna – DJ Tillu	**R. Madhavan – Rocketry: The Nambi Effect**; Brinda – Hey Sinamika; Cibi Chakaravarthi – Don; Ra. Karthik – Nitham Oru Vaanam; Vishal Venkat – Sila Nerangalil Sila Manidhargal
Kannada	Malayalam
**Sagar Puranik – Dollu**; Hariprasad Jayanna – Padavi Poorva; Islahuddin N. S. – Nodi Swamy Ivanu Irode Heege; Pradeep Sastry – Made in Bengaluru; Shoonya – Head Bush	**Abhinav Sunder Nayak – Mukundan Unni Associates**; Nithin Lukose – Paka; Ratheena – Puzhu; Shahi Kabir – Ela Veezha Poonchira; Vishnu Sasi Shankar – Malikappuram
Best Debut Producer
Telugu	Tamil
**Anurag Reddy, Sharath Chandra (A+S Movies) – Major**; Advaya Jishnu Reddy (Virgo Pictures) – Sehari; Allu Bobby (Allu Bobby Company) – Ghani; Raja Babu Miryala, Ashok Reddy Miryala (Srinivasa Cine Creations) – Atithi Devo Bhava; Kankanala Praveena (UG Productions) – Sammathame	**Ravichandran Ramachandran, Thomas George, Aishwarya Lekshmi, Gautham Ramachandran (Blacky, Genie & My Left Foot Productions) – Gargi**; Amala Paul (Amala Paul Productions) – Cadaver; Sarita Madhavan, R. Madhavan, Varghese Moolan, Vijay V. Moolan (Tricolour Films, Varghese Moolan Pictures, 27th Entertainment) – Rocketry: The Nambi Effect; M. Manikandan (Tribal Arts Production) – Kadaisi Vivasayi; Ajmal Khan, Reyya (AR Entertainment, Trident Arts) – Sila Nerangalil Sila Manidhargal
Kannada	Malayalam
**Apeksha Purohit, Pavan Wadeyar (Wadeeyar Movies) – Dollu**; Balakrishna B. S. (Rajani Thursday Stories ) – Made in Bengaluru; Jithendra Manjunath (A. J. Talkies) – Kaaneyaadavara Bagge Prakatane; Nagaraj P. Ajjampura ( Lekhana Creations) – Raja Rani Roarer Rocket; Poornachandra Naidu, Srikanth V. (Sreeyas Chitra) – Home Minister	**Unni Mukundan** **(Unni Mukundan Films) – Meppadiyan**; Mammootty (Mammootty Kampany) – Rorschach; John Abraham (JA Entertainment) – Mike; Ajith Joy, Achu Vijayan (Joy Movie Productions) – Vichithram; Manuel Cruz Darwin (D Group) – Two Men

=== Music ===
Best Music Director
Telugu	Tamil
**M. M. Keeravani** **– RRR**; Bheems Ceciroleo – Dhamaka; Ram Miriyala, Sricharan Pakala – DJ Tillu; Thaman S – Bheemla Nayak; Vishal Chandrashekhar – Sita Ramam	**Anirudh Ravichander – Vikram**; A. R. Rahman – Ponniyin Selvan: I; G. V. Prakash Kumar – Sardar; Santhosh Narayanan – Mahaan; Yuvan Shankar Raja – Love Today
Kannada	Malayalam
**B. Ajaneesh Loknath – Kantara**; Arjun Janya – Ek Love Ya; Nakul Abhyankar – Love Mocktail 2; Nobin Paul – 777 Charlie; Ravi Basrur – KGF: Chapter 2	**Hesham Abdul Wahab** **– Hridayam**; Justin Varghese – Super Sharanya; Ranjin Raj – Malikappuram; Sushin Shyam – Bheeshma Parvam; Vishnu Vijay – Thallumaala
Best Lyricist
Telugu	Tamil
**Chandrabose – "Naatu Naatu" from RRR**; Krishnakanth – "Inthandham" from Sita Ramam; M. M. Keeravani – "Neetho Unte Chalo" from Bimbisara; Ramajogayya Sastry – "Laahe Laahe" from Acharya; Suddala Ashok Teja – "Komuram Bheemudo" from RRR	**Ilango Krishnan – "Ponni Nadhi" from Ponniyin Selvan: I**; Thamarai – "Marakuma Nenjam" from Vendhu Thanindhathu Kaadu; Madhan Karky – "Maayava Thooyava" from Iravin Nizhal; Sivakarthikeyan – "Arabic Kuthu" from Beast; Vignesh Shivan – "Naan Pizhai" from Kaathuvaakula Rendu Kaadhal
Kannada	Malayalam
**Pramod Maravanthe – "Singara Siriye" from Kantara**; Raghavendra Kamath – "Ide Swarga" from Love Mocktail 2; Ravi Basrur – "Toofan" from KGF: Chapter 2; Shashank – "Jagave Neenu Gelathiye" from Love 360; V. Nagendra Prasad – "Belakina Kavithe" from Banaras	**Vinayak Sasikumar** **– "Parudeesa" from Bheeshma Parvam**; Muhsin Parari – "Ole Melody" from Thallumaala; Shane Nigam – "Raa Thaarame" from Bhoothakaalam; Kaithapram Damodaran Namboothiri – "Pottu Thotta Pournami" from Hridayam; Suhail Koya – "Ashubha Mangalakaari" from Super Sharanya
Best Male Playback Singer
Telugu	Tamil
**Ram Miriyala – "Tillu Anna DJ Pedithe" from DJ Tillu**; Kaala Bhairava – "Komuram Bheemudo" from RRR; Sid Sriram – "Kalaavathi" from Sarkaru Vaari Paata; S. P. Charan – "Oh Sita Hey Rama" from Sita Ramam; Rahul Sipligunj, Kaala Bhairava – "Naatu Naatu" from RRR	**Kamal Haasan, Anirudh Ravichander – "Pathala Pathala" from Vikram**; A. R. Rahman – "Marakuma Nenjam" from Vendhu Thanindhathu Kaadu; Dhanush – "Megham Karukkatha" from Thiruchitrambalam; Vijay – "Arabic Kuthu" from Beast; Sid Sriram – "Mother Song" from Valimai
Kannada	Malayalam
**Vijay Prakash – "Singara Siriye" from Kantara**; K. S. Harisankar – "The Hymn of Dharma" from 777 Charlie; Sanjith Hegde – "Belakina Kavithe" from Banaras; Santhosh Venky, Mohan Krishna, Sachin Basrur, Ravi Basrur, Puneeth Rudranag, Manish Dinakar – "Sulthana" from KGF: Chapter 2; Sid Sriram – "Jagave Neenu Gelathiye" from Love 360	**Job Kurian** **– "Pakalo Kaanaathe" from Saudi Vellakka**; Athul Narukara – "Pala Palli" from Kaduva; K. S. Harisankar – "Thaaruzhiyum" from Aaraattu; Unni Menon – "Rathipushpam" from Bheeshma Parvam; Vijay Yesudas – "Cholappenne" from Malayankunju
Best Female Playback Singer
Telugu	Tamil
**Mangli – "Jinthaak" from Dhamaka**; Divya Malika – "Kolu Kolu" from Virata Parvam; Jonita Gandhi – "Ma Ma Mahesha" from Sarkaru Vaari Paata; K. S. Chithra – "Antha Ishtam" from Bheemla Nayak; Prakruthi Reddy – "Komma Uyyala" from RRR	**Jonita Gandhi** **– "Arabic Kuthu" from Beast**; Madhushree – "Mallipoo" from Vendhu Thanindhathu Kaadu; Antara Nandy – "Alaikadal" from Ponniyin Selvan: I; Rakshita Suresh – "Sol" from Ponniyin Selvan: I; Shreya Ghoshal – "Maayava Thooyava" from Iravin Nizhal
Kannada	Malayalam
**Sunidhi Chauhan – "Ra Ra Rakkamma" from Vikrant Rona**; Aishwarya Rangarajan – "Meet Madana" from Ek Love Ya; Chaithra J. Achar – "Soul of Benki" from Benki; Mangli – "Gillakko Shiva" from Vedha; Suchetha Basrur – "Gagana Nee" from KGF: Chapter 2	**Sayanora Philip** **– "Mayilpeeli Ilakunnu" from Pathonpatham Noottandu**; Divya Vineeth – "Onakka Munthiri" from Hridayam; Darshana Rajendran – "Ingaatt Nokanda" from Jaya Jaya Jaya Jaya Hey; Aavani Malhar – "Mandarappoove" from Kumari; Shweta Mohan – "Mannum Niranje" from Malayankunju

== Critics choice awards ==
Telugu cinema

- Best Actor – Adivi Sesh – Major
- Best Actress – Mrunal Thakur – Sita Ramam

Tamil cinema

- Best Actor – R. Madhavan – Rocketry: The Nambi Effect
- Best Actress – Keerthy Suresh – Saani Kaayidham

Kannada cinema

- Best Actor – Rishab Shetty – Kantara
- Best Actress – Sapthami Gowda – Kantara

Malayalam cinema

- Best Actor – Kunchacko Boban – Nna Thaan Case Kodu
- Best Actress – Darshana Rajendran – Jaya Jaya Jaya Jaya Hey

== Special awards ==
- Special Appreciation Award – Mukesh Laxman – Kantara
- Promising Newcomer (Telugu) – Ganesh Bellamkonda – Swathi Muthyam
- Flipkart Fashion Youth Icon – Shruti Haasan
- Sensation of the Year Award – Nikhil Siddhartha, Chandoo Mondeti – Karthikeya 2
- Special Appreciation Award (Actor in a Lead Role Kannada) – Rakshit Shetty – 777 Charlie
- Special Appreciation Award – Basil Joseph for Jaya Jaya Jaya Jaya Hey

== Superlatives ==
Films with multiple nominations
Nominations	Film
11	Kantara
11	KGF: Chapter 2
11	RRR
10	Ponniyin Selvan: I
10	Sita Ramam
8	Bheeshma Parvam
8	DJ Tillu
8	Vikram
7	Hridayam
7	Thallumaala
7	Vikrant Rona
6	777 Charlie
6	Jaya Jaya Jaya Jaya Hey
6	Major
6	Rocketry: The Nambi Effect
6	Thiruchitrambalam
6	Vendhu Thanindhathu Kaadu
5	Bheemla Nayak
5	Dhamaka
5	Don
5	Karthikeya 2
5	Love Today
5	Nna Thaan Case Kodu
4	Beast
4	Dollu
4	Ek Love Ya
4	Gargi
4	Iravin Nizhal
4	Love Mocktail 2
4	Saudi Vellakka
4	Sarkaru Vaari Paata
4	Super Sharanya
3	Appan
3	Ashoka Vanamlo Arjuna Kalyanam
3	Banaras
3	Bimbisara
3	James
3	Love 360
3	Kadaisi Vivasayi
3	Made in Bengaluru
3	Mahaan
3	Padavi Poorva
3	Rorschach
3	Saani Kaayidham
3	Vedha
2	Bhoothakaalam
2	Ela Veezha Poonchira
2	Gaalipata 2
2	Gatta Kusthi
2	HIT: The Second Case
2	Home Minister
2	Jana Gana Mana
2	Kaduva
2	Kumari
2	Malayankunju
2	Malikappuram
2	Mahaveeryar
2	Masooda
2	Mike
2	Mudhal Nee Mudivum Nee
2	Natchathiram Nagargiradhu
2	Nitham Oru Vaanam
2	Oke Oka Jeevitham
2	Pathonpatham Noottandu
2	Sila Nerangalil Sila Manidhargal
2	Triple Riding
2	Trivikrama
2	Valimai
2	Virata Parvam
2	Yashoda

Films with multiple awards
Awards	Film
8	Kantara
5	RRR
5	Vikram
4	Nna Thaan Case Kodu
4	Ponniyin Selvan: I
3	KGF: Chapter 2
3	Saudi Vellakka
3	Sita Ramam
2	777 Charlie
2	Dhamaka
2	Dollu
2	Gargi
2	Hridayam
2	Karthikeya 2
2	Love Today
2	Major
2	Rocketry: The Nambi Effect
2	Vikrant Rona

== Presenters and performers ==
Presenters
Award	Presenter
Best Cinematographer – Telugu	Pranitha Subhash
Best Lyricist – Telugu	Aswani Dutt
Best Music Director – Telugu	Ragini Dwivedi

Performers
Performer	Work
Sreeleela	Dance
Pranitha Subhash	Dance
Shivani Rajashekar	Dance
Mrunal Thakur	Dance
Meenakshi Chaudhary	Dance
Athulya Ravi	Dance
G. V. Prakash Kumar	Singing
