= Filmfare Award for Best Female Playback Singer – Kannada =

Indian annual film award

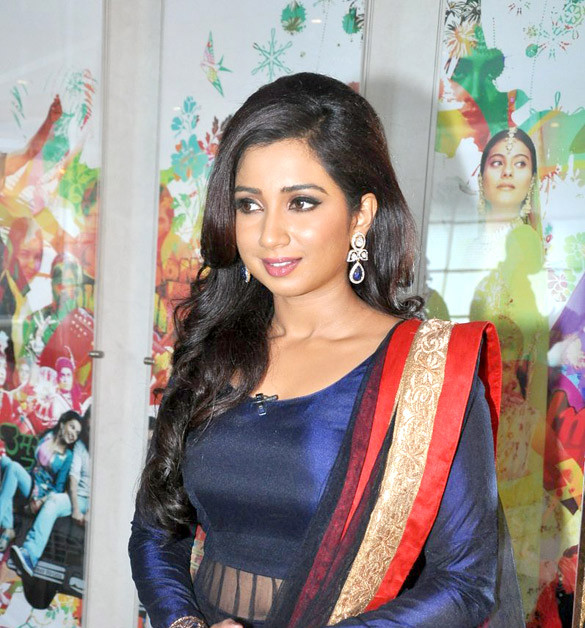
Shreya Ghoshal holds the record of highest number of nominations(16) and most consecutive nominations(15) from 2009 to 2017, resulting in 2 wins.

The Filmfare Award for Best Female Playback – Kannada is given by the Filmfare magazine as part of its annual Filmfare Awards South for Kannada films. The first Kannada award was given in 2007. Before that, from 1997 till 2005, a common award for playback was available for both male and female singers of all the four South Indian languages.

== Superlatives ==
Superlative	Artist	Record
Most wins	Anuradha Bhat	4
Most nominations	Shreya Ghoshal	16
Most nominations in a single year	Shreya Ghoshal	3 (2009)
Most consecutive nominations	Shreya Ghoshal	15 (2009-2017)

== Winners ==
The following is a list of the award winners and the films for which they won.

Year	Singer	Film	Song	Ref.
2024	Shruti Prahlad	Karataka Damanaka	"Hithalakka Karibyada"	
2023	Srilakshmi Belmannu	Sapta Saagaradaache Ello: Side A	"Kadalanu"	
2022	Sunidhi Chauhan	Vikrant Rona	"Ra Ra Rakkamma"	
2020–21	Anuradha Bhat	Bicchugatti	"Dheera Sammohagaara"	
2019	AWARDS FUNCTION WAS SUSPENDED DUE TO COVID-19 PANDEMIC			
2019	Bindhu Malini	Nathicharami	"Bhavalokadada bhrameya"	
2018	Anuradha Bhat	Chowka	"Appa I Love You"	
2017	Ananya Bhat	Rama Rama Re...	"Namma Kayo Devare"	
2016	Inchara Rao	RangiTaranga	"Kareyole"	
2015	Anuradha Bhat	Ugramm	"Chanana Chanana"	
2014	Sowmya Raoh	Simple Agi Ondh Love Story	"Karagida Baaninalli"	
2013	Indu Nagaraj	Govindaya Namaha	"Pyarge Aagbittaite"	
2012	Shreya Ghoshal	Sanju Weds Geetha	"Gaganave Baagi"	
2011	Sunitha Upadrashta	Cheluveye Ninne Nodalu	"O Priyatama Priyatama"	
2010	Shamitha Malnad	Birugaali	"Madhura Pisumaathige"	
2009	Shreya Ghoshal	Mussanjemaatu	"Ninna Nodalentho"	
2008	Nanditha	Duniya	"Kariya I Love You"	
2007	K. S. Chithra	My Autograph	"Araluva Hoovugale"	

== Nominations ==
The nominees were announced publicly only from 2009. The list along with winners:

=== 2000s ===
2009: Shreya Ghoshal – "Ninna Nodalenthu" – Mussanjemaatu

- K. S. Chithra – "Nadheem Dheem Tana" – Gaalipata
- Shreya Ghoshal – "Moggina Manasali" – Moggina Manasu
- Shreya Ghoshal – "Aakasha Bhoomi" – Mussanjemaatu
- Sunidhi Chauhan – "Rock Me Baby" – Haage Summane

=== 2010s ===
2010: Shamitha Malnad – "Madhura Pisu Maathige" – Birugaali

- Nanditha – "Neenendare" – Raam
- Sadhana Sargam – "Marali Mareyagi" – Savaari
- Shreya Ghoshal – "Hoovina Banadante" – Birugaali
- Shreya Ghoshal – "Yenu Helabeku" – Maleyali Jotheyali

2011: Sunitha Upadrashta – "O Priyathama" – Cheluveye Ninne Nodalu

- Neha Kakkar – "Horage Haradide Thamassu" – Thamassu
- Sadhana Sargam – Marali Mareyagi – Savaari
- Shreya Ghoshal – "Ello" – Just Math Mathalli
- Shreya Ghoshal – "Eradu Jadeyannu" – Jackie
- Sunitha Upadrashta – "Prathama" – Modalasala

2012: Shreya Ghoshal – "Gaganave Baagi" – Sanju Weds Geetha

- Lakshmi Manmohan – "Parijathada" – Krishnan Marriage Story
- Shamitha Malnad – "Neerige Baare Chenni" – Jarasandha
- Shamita Malnad – "Manase Manase" – Saarathi
- Shreya Ghoshal – "Maayavi Maayavi" – Lifeu Ishtene

2013: Indu Nagaraj – "Pyarge Aagbittaite" – Govindaya Namaha

- Anuradha Bhat – "Ellello Oduva Manase" – Sidlingu
- Shreya Ghoshal – "Yenendhu Hesaridali" – Anna Bond
- Shreya Ghoshal – "Aalochane" – Romeo
- Vani Harikrishna – "Mussanje Veleli" – Addhuri

2014: Sowmya Raoh – "Karagida Baaninalli" – Simple Agi Ondh Love Story

- Anuradha Bhat – "Sri Krishna" – Bhajarangi
- Manjula Gururaj – "Aakal Benne" – Shravani Subramanya
- Sachina Heggar – "Hedarabyadri" – Kaddipudi
- Shreya Ghoshal – "Modala Maleyante" – Myna

2015: Anuradha Bhat – "Chanchana Chanchana" – Ugramm

- Archana Ravi – "Kannalle Kannige" – Adyaksha
- Malathi – "Pantara Panta" – Maanikya
- Shreya Ghoshal – "Kaakig Banna Kantha" – Ulidavaru Kandanthe
- Sinchana Dixit – "Currentu Hoda Timealli" – Love in Mandya

2016: Inchara Rao – "Kareyole" – RangiTaranga

- Anuradha Bhat – "Irali Heege" – Benkipatna
- Indu Nagaraj – "Ka Thalkattu Kaa" – Mr. Airavata
- Shreya Ghoshal – "Shuru Shuru" – 1st Rank Raju
- Vani Harikrishna – "Raata Patta" – Rhaatee

2017: Ananya Bhat – "Namma Kayo Devare" – Rama Rama Re...

- Anuradha Bhat – "Yavoora Geleya" – Ricky
- Indu Nagaraj – "Thraas Akkathi" – Doddmane Hudga
- Shreya Ghoshal – "Neenire Saniha" – Kirik Party
- Vani Harikrishna – "Neenaagi Helalilla" – Happy Birthday

2018: Anuradha Bhat – "Appa I Love You" from Chowka

- Eesha Suchi – "Preethi Maruva Santheyalli" from Beautiful Manasugalu
- Indu Nagaraj – "Sanje Hotthu" from Tarak
- R. K. Sparsha – "O Manase" from Kempirve
- Supriya Lohith – "Nee Nanna Olavu" from Chamak

2019: Bindhu Malini – "Bhavalokada Bhrameya" from Nathicharami

- Aditi Sagar – "Dum Maro Dum" from Raambo 2
- Ananya Bhat – "Hold On Hold On" from Tagaru
- Anuradha Bhat – "Holeva Holeyachage" from Ammachi Yemba Nenapu
- Bindhu Malini – "Bhavalokada" from Nathicharami
- Madhuri Sheshadri – "Nooraru Bannagalu" from Sarkari Hi. Pra. Shaale, Kasaragodu, Koduge: Ramanna Rai

=== 2020s ===
2020–21: Anuradha Bhat – "Dheera Sammohagaara" from Bicchugatti

- Aishwarya Rangarajan – "Malaye Malaye" from Salaga
- Chinmayi – "Soul of Dia" from Dia
- Shreya Ghoshal – "Kannu Hodiyaka" from Roberrt
- Shruthi VS – "Love you Chinna" from Love Mocktail
- Shwetha Devanahally – "Tareefu Maadalu" from Mugilpete

2022: Sunidhi Chauhan – "Ra Ra Rakkamma" from Vikrant Rona

- Aarna Shetty – "Sahapaati" from 777 Charlie
- Harshika Devanath – "Aane Maadi Heluteeni" from Guru Shishyaru
- Indu Nagaraj – "Aralada Mallige" from Vedha
- Siri Ravikumar – "Sangaathi" from Sakutumba Sametha

2023: Srilakshmi Belmannu – "Kadalanu" from Sapta Saagaradaache Ello: Side A

- Madhuri Seshadri – "Mellage" from Swathi Mutthina Male Haniye
- Mangli – "Pasandaagavne" from Kaatera
- Prithwi Bhat – "Kousalya Supraja Rama" from Kousalya Supraja Rama
- Sangeetha Katti – "Kaayo Shiva Kapado Shiva" from Pentagon

2024: Shruti Prahlad – "Hithalakka Karibyada" from Karataka Damanaka

- Indu Nagaraj – "Chinnamma" from Krishnam Pranaya Sakhi
- Shivani Swamy – "Ella Maathannu Onde Baari" from Ondu Sarala Prema Kathe
- Srilakshmi Belmannu – "Radhe" from Ibbani Tabbida Ileyali
- Vaish – "I Love You" from Bheema

== See also ==
- List of music awards honoring women
- Filmfare Award for Best Male Playback Singer – Kannada
