= SIIMA Award for Best Male Debut – Tamil =

Tamil film male debut award

- Description: Best Debut Performance by an Actor in a Leading Role in Tamil cinema
- Country: India
- Presented by: Vibri Media Group
- First award: 22 June 2012 (for films released in 2011)
- Most recent winner: LK Akshay Kumar, Sirai (2025)

SIIMA Award for Best Male Debut – Tamil is presented by Vibri media group as part of its annual South Indian International Movie Awards, for the best acting done by a male actor in a leading role in his debut Tamil film. The award was first given in 2012 for films released in 2011.

== Winners and nominees ==
Year	Actor	Film	Ref.
2011 (1st)	Sharwanand	Engaeyum Eppothum	
2011 (1st)	Nani	Veppam	
2012 (2nd)	Vikram Prabhu	Kumki	
2012 (2nd)	Sivakarthikeyan	Manam Kothi Paravai	
2012 (2nd)	Udhayanidhi Stalin	Oru Kal Oru Kannadi	
2012 (2nd)	Vijay Antony	Naan	
2012 (2nd)	Dinesh	Attakathi	
2013 (3rd)
2013 (3rd)	Gautham Karthik	Kadal	
2013 (3rd)	Nivin Pauly	Neram	
2013 (3rd)	Dileepan	Vathikuchi	
2013 (3rd)	Naveen. S	Moodar Koodam	
2013 (3rd)	Ram	Thanga Meengal	
2014 (4th)
2014 (4th)	Chandran	Kayal	
2014 (4th)	Dulquer Salmaan	Vaayai Moodi Pesavum	
2014 (4th)	Aari	Nedunchaalai	
2014 (4th)	Abhinay Vaddi	Ramanujan	
2014 (4th)	Santhosh Pratap	Kathai Thiraikathai Vasanam Iyakkam	
2015 (5th)
2015 (5th)	G. V. Prakash Kumar	Darling	
2015 (5th)	Darbuka Siva	Rajathanthiram	
2015 (5th)	Sai Rajkumar	Kuttram Kadithal	
2015 (5th)	Shanmugapandiyan	Sagaptham	
2015 (5th)	Varun	Oru Naal Iravil	
2016 (6th)
2016 (6th)	Kalidas Jayaram	Meen Kuzhambum Mann Paanaiyum	
2016 (6th)	Balakrishna Kola	Maalai Nerathu Mayakkam	
2016 (6th)	Shirish Saravanan	Metro	
2016 (6th)	Vijay Kumar	Uriyadi	
2016 (6th)	Walter Phillips	Meendum Oru Kadhal Kadhai	
2017 (7th)
2017 (7th)	Vasanth Ravi	Taramani	
2017 (7th)	Hiphop Tamizha	Meesaya Murukku	
2017 (7th)	Vetri	8 Thottakkal	
2018 (8th)
2018 (8th)	Dinesh	Oru Kuppa Kathai	
2018 (8th)	Adhithya Bhaskar	'96	
2018 (8th)	Anthony	Merku Thodarchi Malai	
2018 (8th)	Darshan	Kanaa	
2018 (8th)	Saravanan	Raatchasan	
2019 (9th)
2019 (9th)	Ken Karunas	Asuran	
2019 (9th)	Vishwa	Champion	
2019 (9th)	Abi Hassan	Kadaram Kondan	
2019 (9th)	Dhruv Vikram	Adithya Varma	
2019 (9th)	Santosh Sreeram	To Let	
2020 (9th)
2020 (9th)	Sriram Karthik	Kanni Maadam	
2020 (9th)	Rajkumar Pitchumani	Psycho	
2020 (9th)	Rakshan	Kannum Kannum Kollaiyadithaal	
2020 (9th)	Sikkil Gurucharan	Putham Pudhu Kaalai	
2020 (9th)	Jaffer Sadiq	Paava Kadhaigal	
2021 (10th)
2021 (10th)	Subash Selvam	Thittam Irandu	
2021 (10th)	Rasu Ranjith	Theethum Nandrum	
2021 (10th)	Vatsan M. Natarajan	Kayamai Kadakka	
2021 (10th)	Kutty Mani	Methagu	
2021 (10th)	Vasanth Selvam	Kadaseela Biriyani	
2022 (11th)	Pradeep Ranganathan	Love Today	
2022 (11th)	Legend Saravanan	The Legend	
2022 (11th)	Kishen Das	Mudhal Nee Mudivum Nee	
2022 (11th)	Selvaraghavan	Saani Kaayidham	
2022 (11th)	Nallandi	Kadaisi Vivasayi	
2023 (12th)	Hridhu Haroon	Thugs	
2023 (12th)	Kartheekeyan Santhanam	Fight Club	
2023 (12th)	Shakthi Mithran	Yaathisai	
2023 (12th)	Shyam Selvan	Margazhi Thingal	
2023 (12th)	Venkat Senguttuvan	Mathimaran	
2024 (13th)	Vijay Kanishka	Hit List	
2024 (13th)	Dhirav	Veppam Kulir Mazhai	
2024 (13th)	Pari Elavazhagan	Jama	
2024 (13th)	Ponvel M.	Vaazhai	
2024 (13th)	Praveen Kishore	Minmini	
2025 (14th)	LK Akshay Kumar	Sirai	
2025 (14th)	Akash Murali	Nesippaya	
2025 (14th)	Aditya Madhavan	Others	
2025 (14th)	Rudra	Oho Enthan Baby	
2025 (14th)	Pavish Narayan	Nilavuku En Mel Ennadi Kobam	
2025 (14th)	Surya Sethupathi	Phoenix	

== See also ==
- SIIMA Award for Best Actor – Tamil
- SIIMA Critics Award for Best Actor – Tamil
