= SIIMA Critics Award for Best Actor – Tamil =

Tamil-language media award

- Awarded for: Best Performance by an Actor in a Leading Role in Tamil cinema
- Country: India
- Presented by: Vibri Media Group
- First award: 22 June 2012 (for films released in 2011)
- Most recent winner: Pradeep Ranganathan, Dragon (2025)

Highlights
- Most wins: Karthi and R. Madhavan (3)

SIIMA Critics Award for Best Actor – Tamil is presented by Vibri media group as part of its annual South Indian International Movie Awards, for best acting done by an actor in Tamil films, who are selected by the jury. The award was first given in 2012 for films released in 2011.

== Superlatives ==
- R. Madhavan and Karthi have maximum awards with three wins.
- Dhanush and Sivakarthikeyan have also won the SIIMA Award for Best Actor – Tamil.

== Winners ==
| Year | Actor | Film | Ref. |
|---|---|---|---|
| 2011 | Vikram | Deiva Thirumagal | |
| 2012 | Vijay Sethupathi | Pizza | |
| 2013 | Dhanush | Mariyaan | |
| 2014 | Karthi | Madras | |
| 2015 | Jayam Ravi | Thani Oruvan | |
| 2016 | R. Madhavan | Irudhi Suttru | |
| 2017 | R. Madhavan | Vikram Vedha | |
| 2018 | Jayam Ravi | Adanga Maru | |
| 2019 | Karthi | Kaithi | |
| 2020 | Ashok Selvan | Oh My Kadavule | |
| 2021 | Arya | Sarpatta Parambarai | |
| 2022 | R. Madhavan | Rocketry: The Nambi Effect | |
| 2023 | Sivakarthikeyan | Maaveeran | |
| 2024 | Karthi | Meiyazhagan | |
| 2025 | Pradeep Ranganathan | Dragon | |

== See also ==
- SIIMA Award for Best Actor – Tamil
- SIIMA Award for Best Male Debut – Tamil
