= Hridayam (soundtrack) =

Soundtrack album by Hesham Abdul Wahab
- Released: 31 December 2021 (A-side); 7 January 2022 (B-side)
- Recorded: 2019–2021
- Genre: Feature film soundtrack
- Length: 21:43 / 23:22
- Language: Malayalam
- Label: Think Music
- Producer: Hesham Abdul Wahab

Hesham Abdul Wahab chronology
Madhuram (2021)	Hridayam (2021)	Mike (2022)

Singles from Hridayam
- 1. "Darshana" Released: 25 October 2021; 2. "Arike Ninna" Released: 6 December 2021; 3. "Onakka Munthiri" Released: 17 December 2021

Hridayam is the soundtrack album for the 2022 Malayalam film of the same name directed by Vineeth Sreenivasan, starring Pranav Mohanlal, Kalyani Priyadarshan, and Darshana Rajendran in the lead roles. The music and background score is composed by playback singer-composer Hesham Abdul Wahab. The soundtrack album features 15 songs with lyrics written by Kaithapram Damodaran Namboothiri, Arun Alat, Guna Balasubramanian and Sreenivasan. It was purchased and marketed by Think Music.

The music album was highly anticipated as it is the first to be released in physical formats, including audio cassettes and music CDs after more than a decade. The album was split into A-side and B-side, with the former consisting 7 tracks was released first on 31 December 2021, coinciding New Year's Eve and the latter consisting of 8 tracks, was released on 7 January 2022. A promotional event was held on the same day in Kochi, to launch the album in physical formats. In addition, a limited edition LP record of the album will be launched after the film's release, which will have 20 tracks in total.

== Production ==
Vineeth roped in Hesham Abdul Wahab as the composer instead of Shaan Rahman, who worked with all of the director's projects since the latter's debut film Malarvadi Arts Club (2010). Both Shaan and Vineeth wanted to "bring new talents to the industry and utilize in the right way". In an interview to The Hindu, Wahab had stated that the opportunity to work in Hridayam came at a time, when he was struggling as a composer and did not get the projects he expected to give music as he liked. According to Hesham, Vineeth chose him to compose for the film's score and soundtrack, as he appreciated his work in the Sufi album Qaddam Badha (2015).

Initially, Wahab planned for 9 songs in the album. But due to the COVID-19 pandemic lockdown in India, which interrupted the production works of the film, Vineeth thought of treating some situations musically and re-wrote the script. As a result, a total of 15 songs were composed in the process, which Wahab had stated that "no other Malayalam film had several songs in recent times". Most of the songs are situational, according to the film's theme. In order to experiment on the film score and music, Vineeth went to Istanbul to record pieces of music for the film in early-January 2020, where he met many musicians from the country and recorded live instruments which will be used for the film's music. A lot of instruments from the Middle East territories were used, as he wanted to experiment a soundscape that is new in Malayalam film music, fusing Indian classical, Western and Middle-Eastern sounds.

"I think the decision to use vocals only for this song has really worked because it can connect with all kinds of audience. One can get personally attached to this track because, everyone, regardless of a musician or not, is a vocalist in their own way, so that helps the song to connect with everyone."

— Hesham Abdul Wahab, on the making of the song "Onakka Munthiri".

The first track of the film, "Darshana", was recorded during early July 2019, in an in-built studio in Wahab's house. The track was sung by Wahab along with Darshana Rajendran, aside from acting in the film. The title was also derived from the actor's name as well. He wanted to use the instruments in the Indian context, as a result he used various instruments and blended with the sound in the songs. V. Harishankar worked on the sound mixing of the album. The song "Darshana" was mixed and mastered about 35 times, until the final version was approved the team.

The track "Onakka Munthiri" was made only with the use of vocals, and did not use any instruments or background score. Wahab used the same rhythm which Vineeth had sung for him. While composing the track, he needed a soft and breezy voice, and has approached Divya Vineeth to croon for the track. According to Divya, she stated that Wahab wanted to first try the song in her voice, which she did and the composer decided to go with it. In February 2020, actor Prithviraj Sukumaran recorded the track "Thathaka Thethitare" for this film. The track "Kural Kekkutha" celebrates the city of Chennai and its culture. The "Hridayam Theme" was performed by the Istanbul musicians ensemble, collaborating with Cochin Strings Orchestra. Vineeth wanted it as a song that is performed at a live concert with symphonic arrangements.

== Track listing ==
The track list of the film was revealed by Mohanlal through his social media accounts on 21 June 2021, coinciding the occasion of World Music Day. Without revealing the song titles, the track list featured the details of the singers and the lyricists, with Kaithapram Damodaran Namboothiri penned six out of 15 tracks, along with Arun Alat penning three tracks; Vineeth Sreenivasan and Guna Balasubramanian writing one track each. The album also featured a poem written by 18th century poet-philosopher Bulleh Shah, a track based on the composition of poet Tyagaraja, having two versions and an instrumental track performed by Istanbul musicians and Cochin Strings. K. S. Chithra, Srinivas, Unni Menon, Sachin Warrier, Job Kurian along with other musicians performed the tracks in the album.

Hridayam (Side A)
No.	Title	Lyrics	Singer(s)	Length
1.	"Manasse Manasse"	Kaithapram Damodaran Namboothiri	Vineeth Sreenivasan	3:10
2.	"Darshana"	Arun Alat	Hesham Abdul Wahab, Darshana Rajendran	3:45
3.	"Mukilinte"	Kaithapram Damodaran Namboothiri	K. S. Chithra	3:01
4.	"Onakka Munthiri"	Vineeth Sreenivasan	Divya Vineeth, Vineeth Sreenivasan	3:00
5.	"Thathaka Theithare"	Kaithapram Damodaran Namboothiri	Prithviraj Sukumaran	2:39
6.	"Minnalkodi"	Kaithapram Damodaran Namboothiri	K. S. Chithra, Mohammed Maqbool Mansoor, Sachin Warrier, Hesham Abdul Wahab	3:01
7.	"Arike Ninna"	Arun Alat	Job Kurian	4:25
Total length:				21:43

Hridayam (Side B)
No.	Title	Lyrics	Singer(s)	Length
1.	"Pottu Thotta Pournami"	Kaithapram Damodaran Namboothiri	Sachin Balu, Megha Josekutty	3:21
2.	"Nagumo" (composition and lyrics of Tyagaraja)		Arvind Venugopal	2:40
3.	"Puthiyoru Lokam"	Kaithapram Damodaran Namboothiri	Vimal Roy, Bhadra Rajin	3:22
4.	"Sarvam Sadha"	Arun Alat	Srinivas	2:35
5.	"Kural Kekkutha"	Guna Balasubramanian	Unni Menon	2:32
6.	"Bas Kar Ji" (poem of Bulleh Shah)		Sachin Warrier	2:53
7.	"Hridayam Theme" (performed by Istanbul Ensemble and Cochin Strings)			6:01
8.	"Nagumo Revival" (composition of Tyagaraja)		Arvind Venugopal, Swetha Ashok	2:42
Total length:				23:22

== Marketing ==
The people who prefer to listen to music through physical copies, maintaining the tape recorders or Walkman in great condition and preserving a huge collection of audiotapes from the past are still around. This is not just about nostalgia. During a time when anything and everything is turning digital, these are the souls who feel that analog has the quality to touch our hearts. And I have always felt they are right.

— Vineeth Sreenivasan, on Facebook, sharing his opinion on launching the music album of Hridayam through physical formats.

The rights for the soundtrack album were purchased by Think Music. In an innovative approach, the makers are planning to launch the film's soundtrack through audio cassettes and audio CDs by Think Music, so as to provide a wholesome listening experience to the audience and music lovers. Eventually, it is the first film to have its soundtrack launched in analog and digital formats; the idea was a result of the discussion between Hesham and Vineeth when they went to Istanbul for recording sessions and had spotted a shop which sells CDs and cassettes which felt that it was nostalgic, and Hesham stated it as "My gateway to music was through cassettes and CDs, which I used to buy whenever I come to India for vacations. Those experiences will never go away from my heart".

Since the production of audio cassettes, CDs and vinyl discs were obsolete in India, the executives of Think Music had to partner with cassette manufacturer in Japan to import its physical copies to India. With its final mixing and mastering of the songs being conducted within September 2021, Hesham and Vineeth handed over the master copy to the record label. In addition, the label will also launch a limited edition vinyl records, which will have more than 20 tracks including few instrumental pieces from the film score.

The pre-booking of the cassettes and CDs began on late-November, through the official website of the music label which was rebranded. Excluding the cost of shipping, the price of the physical copies was fixed to be ₹199 which was expected to be available within January 2022. Santhosh Kumar, the chief executive of Think Music, stated that "We have already received 1,000 pre-orders for cassettes and 500 for CDs, from listeners across Kerala, Tamil Nadu and Karnataka. As a music label, our scope ends with making the cassettes and CDs. The availability of electronic equipment is not in our purview, but we do know that there are many households that still have cassette players. They are also available in some electronic shops and can be ordered online."

== Release ==
On 25 October 2021, the first single "Darshana" was launched coinciding with the re-opening of theatres in Kerala. The song is picturised on Pranav Mohanlal and Darshana Rajendran during their college days. On 6 December 2021, the second track "Arike Ninna" was released, which depicted the "pain and frustration" of the lead character. A celebratory song, titled "Onakka Mundhiri" was released as the third single on 17 December. On 31 December 2021, coinciding with the New Year's Eve, Vineeth Sreenivasan announced that the A-side of Hridayam's soundtrack will be launched on the same day. The remaining tracks were released as the B-side of the soundtrack online on 7 January 2022. The same day, a promotional event held in Kochi, with the presence of Mohanlal and film producer Antony Perumbavoor, in order to release the physical copies of the album – through cassettes and CDs. Mohanlal praised Vineeth Sreenivasan and the crew for bringing the true essence of music, adding that it reminded of his films: His Highness Abdullah (1990), Bharatham (1991) and Kamaladalam (1992), which had a strong emphasis on Malayalam film music and particularly the former, set the record for highest sales in music cassettes in Kerala. He further added "It makes me glad to know that Hridayam is bringing the emphasis of music with a whole new dimension".

== Reception ==
Upon releases, the tracks "Darshana" and "Onakka Munthiri" were positively received by music critics, cinephiles and netizens. In an interview with The Times of India, Nithya Mammen, who won the Kerala State Film Award for Best Singer for the track "Vathikkalu Vellaripravu" featured in Sufiyum Sujatayum (2020), listed "Darshana" as one of her favourite picks of the "Top 10 Malayalam Songs of 2021". Mammen had stated it as "a very refreshing song, which also has a positive energy". Celebrities such as Dulquer Salmaan too praised the track. "Darshana" crossed more than 3.5 million views within 48 hours. In its critical review for The Indian Express, VS Gowtham stated that "the songs blend well with the film". Anand Kochukudy of The Quint had stated "Hesham Abdul Wahab’s music is also fresh and adds to the film. The “Onakka Munthiri” number (with just vocals) sung by debutante Divya, spouse of Vineeth Sreenivasan, stands out for its peppiness." A critical review from Manorama Online praised Hesham's songs as "the heart and soul of the film" that are "seamlessly blended into the narrative". Critic Vipin Nair stated the album as "a labour of love from the composer (Hesham Abdul Wahab)" and a "multilingual" and "multi-genre treat". He further wrote: "At a time when most Malayalam soundtracks do not last more than 15 minutes, a soundtrack of this length and diversity is a welcome change to a music lovers. Adding to that the way this album has been packaged and marketed, feels nice to see this level of care compared to how a lot of movies do not even have their songs come out on time."

== Accolades ==
Award	Date of Ceremony	Category	Recipient(s)	Result	Ref.
Kerala State Film Awards	27 May 2022	Best Music Director (Songs)	Hesham Abdul Wahab	Won	
South Indian International Movie Awards	15–16 September 2023	Best Music Director – Malayalam	Hesham Abdul Wahab	Won	
South Indian International Movie Awards	15–16 September 2023	Best Lyricist – Malayalam	Kaithapram Damodaran Namboothiri – ("Pottu Thottu Pournami")	Nominated	
South Indian International Movie Awards	15–16 September 2023	Best Female Playback Singer – Malayalam	Divya Vineeth – ("Onakka Munthiri")	Nominated	
