= SIIMA Award for Best Actor – Tamil =

Tamil-language media award

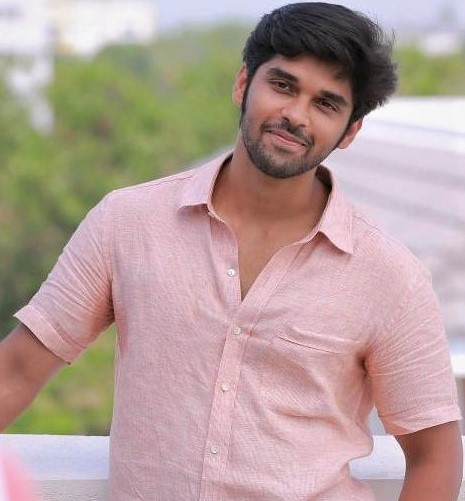
- The 2026 recipient: Dhruv Vikram
- Awarded for: Best Performance by an Actor in a Leading Role in Tamil cinema
- Country: India
- Presented by: Vibri Media Group
- First award: 22 June 2012 (for films released in 2011)
- Most recent winner: Dhruv Vikram, Bison Kaalamaadan (2025)

Highlights
- Most wins: Dhanush and Sivakarthikeyan (5)
- Most nominations: Dhanush (10)

SIIMA Award for Best Actor – Tamil is presented by Vibri media group as part of its annual South Indian International Movie Awards, for best acting done by an actor in Tamil films. The award was first given in 2012 for films released in 2011.

== Superlatives ==
| Categories | Recipient | Record |
|---|---|---|
| Most wins | Dhanush | 5 |
| Most wins | Sivakarthikeyan | 5 |
| Most consecutive wins | Dhanush | 4 (2011–2012, 2018–2019) |
| Most nominations | Dhanush | 10 |
| Most consecutive nominations | Dhanush | 5 (2011–2015) |
| Most nominations without a win | C. Joseph Vijay | 8 |
| Oldest winner | Kamal Haasan | Age 68 (11th SIIMA) |
| Oldest nominee | Rajinikanth | Age 73 (12th SIIMA) |
| Youngest winner | Dhanush | Age 28 years 10 months (1st SIIMA) |
| Youngest nominee | Dhanush | Age 28 years 10 months (1st SIIMA) |

- Dhanush and Sivakarthikeyan have also won the SIIMA Critics Award for Best Actor – Tamil.
- Vikram and Dhruv Vikram are the only father-and-son duo to win the award.

== Winners ==
| Year | Actor | Film | Ref. |
|---|---|---|---|
| 2011 | Dhanush | Aadukalam | |
| 2012 | Dhanush | 3 | |
| 2013 | Sivakarthikeyan | Ethir Neechal | |
| 2014 | Dhanush | Velaiilla Pattadhari | |
| 2015 | Vikram | I | |
| 2016 | Sivakarthikeyan | Remo | |
| 2017 | Sivakarthikeyan | Velaikkaran | |
| 2018 | Dhanush | Vada Chennai | |
| 2019 | Dhanush | Asuran | |
| 2020 | Suriya | Soorarai Pottru | |
| 2021 | Sivakarthikeyan | Doctor | |
| 2021 | Silambarasan | Maanaadu | |
| 2022 | Kamal Haasan | Vikram | |
| 2023 | Vikram | Ponniyin Selvan: II | |
| 2024 | Sivakarthikeyan | Amaran | |
| 2025 | Dhruv Vikram | Bison Kaalamaadan | |

== Nominations ==
- 2011: Dhanush – Aadukalam
  - Vikram – Deiva Thirumagal
  - Suriya – 7 Aum Arivu
  - Ajith Kumar – Mankatha
  - Vishal – Avan Ivan
- 2012: Dhanush – 3
  - Vijay Sethupathi – Pizza
  - Vijay – Thuppakki
  - Vishnu Vishal – Neerparavai
  - Suriya – Maattrraan
- 2013: Sivakarthikeyan – Ethir Neechal
  - Dhanush – Mariyaan
  - Kamal Haasan – Vishwaroopam
  - Suriya – Singam II
  - Vishal – Pandiya Naadu
- 2014: Dhanush – Velaiilla Pattadhari
  - Vijay – Kaththi
  - Karthi – Madras
  - Siddharth – Jigarthanda
  - Vijay Sethupathi – Pannaiyarum Padminiyum
- 2015: Vikram – I
  - Dhanush – Anegan
  - Jayam Ravi – Thani Oruvan
  - Lawrence Raghavendra – Kanchana 2
  - Vijay Sethupathi – Orange Mittai
- 2016: Sivakarthikeyan – Remo
  - Karthi – Thozha
  - Suriya – 24
  - Vijay – Theri
  - Vikram – Iru Mugan
- 2017: Sivakarthikeyan – Velaikkaran
  - Karthi – Theeran Adhigaaram Ondru
  - Vishal – Thupparivaalan
  - Vijay – Mersal
  - Vijay Sethupathi – Vikram Vedha
- 2018: Dhanush – Vada Chennai
  - Vijay – Sarkar
  - Karthi – Kadaikutty Singam
  - Jayam Ravi – Adanga Maru
  - Vijay Sethupathi – 96
- 2019: Dhanush – Asuran
  - Vijay – Bigil
  - Karthi – Kaithi
  - Ajith Kumar – Viswasam
  - Sivakarthikeyan – Namma Veettu Pillai
  - Vijay Sethupathi – Super Deluxe
- 2020: Suriya – Soorarai Pottru
  - Udhayanidhi Stalin – Psycho
  - Jiiva – Gypsy
  - RJ Balaji – Mookuthi Amman
  - Shantanu Bhagyaraj – Paava Kadhaigal
- 2021: Sivakarthikeyan – Doctor and Silambarasan – Maanaadu
  - Arya – Sarpatta Parambarai
  - Dhanush – Karnan
  - Suriya – Jai Bhim
  - Vijay – Master
- 2022: Kamal Haasan – Vikram
  - Dhanush – Thiruchitrambalam
  - R. Madhavan – Rocketry: The Nambi Effect
  - Silambarasan – Vendhu Thanindhathu Kaadu
  - Vikram – Mahaan and Ponniyin Selvan: I
- 2023: Vikram – Ponniyin Selvan: II
  - Rajinikanth – Jailer
  - Siddharth – Chithha
  - Sivakarthikeyan – Maaveeran
  - Vijay – Leo
  - Udhayanidhi Stalin – Maamannan
- 2024: Sivakarthikeyan – Amaran
  - Dhanush – Raayan
  - Harish Kalyan – Lubber Pandhu
  - Karthi – Meiyazhagan
  - Vijay Sethupathi – Maharaja
  - Vikram – Thangalaan
- 2025: Dhruv Vikram – Bison Kaalamaadan
  - Dulquer Salmaan – Kaantha
  - Pradeep Ranganathan – Dragon
  - M. Sasikumar – Tourist Family
  - Vijay Sethupathi – Thalaivan Thalaivii
  - Vikram – Veera Dheera Sooran

== See also ==
- SIIMA Critics Award for Best Actor – Tamil
- SIIMA Award for Best Male Debut – Tamil
