= Rudrangi =

2023 Telugu language drama film by Ajay Samrat

- Directed by: Ajay Samrat
- Written by: Ajay Samrat
- Produced by: Rasamayi Balakishan
- Starring: Jagapati Babu; Ganavi Laxman; Mamta Mohandas; Ashish Gandhi; Vimala Raman
- Cinematography: Santosh Shanamoni
- Edited by: Bonthala Nageswara Reddy
- Music by: Nawfal Raja AIS
- Production company: Rasamayi Films
- Release date: 7 July 2023
- Running time: 142 mins
- Country: India
- Language: Telugu

Rudrangi is 2023 Indian Telugu-language epic action drama film written and directed by Ajay Samrat and produced by Rasamayi Balakishan under Rasamayi Films. It stars Ganavi Laxman as the titular character alongside Jagapati Babu, Mamta Mohandas, Ashish Gandhi and Vimala Raman in vital roles. The soundtrack is composed by Nawfal Raja AIS. It was released on 7 July 2023.

== Cast ==
- Jagapathi Babu as Bheemrao Deshmukh
- Ganavi Laxman as Rudrangi
- Mamta Mohandas as Jwala Bai Deshmukh
- Vimala Raman as Meera Bai Deshmukh
- Ashish Gandhi as Malesh
- Kalakeya Prabhakar as Bhujanga Rao
- RS Nanda as Karanam
- Katta Antony as Maisigadu
- Rangadham as Rajanna
- Divi Vadthya as dancer
- Charishma Sreekar as Rudrangi-2, Bheema Rao's daughter
- Naveena Reddy as Nagamani

== Soundtrack ==
Rudrangi

Soundtrack album by Nawfal Raja AIS
- Released: 7 July 2023
- Recorded: 2022–2023
- Genre: Feature film soundtrack
- Length: 7:26
- Language: Telugu
- Label: T-Series
- Producer: Nawfal Raja Asi

Nawfal Raja AIS chronology
Ardha Shathabdam (2021)	Rudrangi (2023)	Narakasura (2023)

Singles from Rudrangi
- 1. "Rudrangi Lyrical Title" Released: 25 February 2023

The soundtrack and score of the film is composed by Nawfal Raja Asi. The audio rights were acquired by T-Series.

No.	Title	Lyrics	Artist(s)	Length
1.	"Jajimogulali"	Abhinaya Srinivas	Mohana Bhogaraju	3:45
2.	"Rudrangi Title Song"	Manukota Prasad	Kailash Kher	3:56
Total length:				7:26

== Production ==
The film motion poster has been launched on 3 October 2022 and Mamta Mohandas first look on 22 October 2022. The teaser is out on 17 April 2023 and trailer on 26 June 2023 and The movie is scheduled to release on 7 July 2023. Its Pre-release function held on 30 June 2023 at Pradhan Conventions, Financial District. Nandamuri Balakrishna graced function as Chief Guest who proclaimed it as rarest.

== Reception ==
Prakash Precheti of The South First rated the film 2/5 stars, stating that the film's "drama takes a backseat in the process as the story becomes too fictional". Srivathsan Nadadhur of OTT Play gave the film a rating of 3/5 and wrote "While Rudrangi has its share of eccentricities, the director Ajay Samrat leaves a lasting impression with his eye for drama, nuanced understanding of human emotions and commercial appeal. With powerful performances by Jagapathi Babu, Mamta Mohandas and Ashish Gandhi, this is a gripping period drama".

Satya Pulgam of ABP Desam wrote "From the beginning to the end of 'Rudrangi', the emotions in most of the scenes impress the audience. Director Ajay has shown good command in terms of scenes and emotions. Especially the words are very good". A reviewer of Telugu Asianet News wrote "Finally, a movie that explores the background of Telangana aristocrats from another perspective. What "Rudrangi" wanted was not slavery, but schools". Mirchi9 rated 1.5/5. Jagapathi Babu plays an obnoxious character, Ashish Gandhi looks physically apt, and female leads Vimala Raman, Mamta Mohandas & Ganavi Laxman work adequately. The movie is to be said unbearably loud. Telugu Bulletin affirms ‘Rudrangi’ has a decent storyline but the second half is dragged down and the climax is outdated.
