= Kantara (soundtrack) =

- Soundtrack album cover

Soundtrack album by B. Ajaneesh Loknath
- Released: 12 October 2022
- Recorded: 2021–2022
- Genre: Feature film soundtrack
- Length: 22:14
- Language: Kannada
- Label: Hombale Music
- Producer: B. Ajaneesh Loknath; Bobby C.R.

B. Ajaneesh Loknath chronology
Guru Shishyaru (2022)	Kantara (2022)	Champion (2022)
External audio
- Official Audio Jukebox on YouTube

Singles from Kantara
- 1. "Singara Siriye" Released: 15 August 2022

Kantara is the soundtrack album composed by B. Ajaneesh Loknath for the 2022 Indian Kannada-language action thriller film of the same name, directed by Rishab Shetty, starring Shetty himself, along with Sapthami Gowda, Kishore and Achyuth Kumar. The lyrics were written by Pramod Maravanthe, Shashiraj Kavoor and Trilok Trivikrama. The album featured six songs and was released on 12 October 2022.

== Development ==
Rishab Shetty decided to bring the folk music as an integral part of the script while writing, whereas Loknath added that the music in the film is different for other films he had composed. He brought in nearly 30–40 musicians, with approximately 10 musicians in a group resided during Kundapur, and all the songs were recorded at an open-air theatre in Mangalore, while multiple music groups who play instruments such as Koraga's Dollu, Huli Kunitha Dollu, Thase, Nadaswaram and Chanda performed the music, so as to give importance to the folk music in Tulu Nadu.

Nearly 40 hours of recording were used for the film's background score, for which Loknath excited him more than the songs, as "there is immense scope for experimentation". He combined flute with dollu instrument, so that the sound of dollu would dominate the flute music, and also used Australian tribal instrument didgeridoo which served as the "key in producing the scream-like sound" which was enriched by blending with kazoo. For the Daiva dance, he used Damaru and gaggara, and also hired noted sound recordists Arun and Shine to capture and produce that sound.

The folk instruments was then fused and programmed into the western music to elevate the cinematic experience. Especially, in the song "Varahaa Roopam" where Loknath infused carnatic classical music, folk and western rock; the classical music is composed using Todi, Varali and Mukhari ragas. The rock music was used during the Buta Kola portion, to intensify that scene were "Ravana shows his intense bhakti towards Shiva". He adapted the throat singing concept (used in Tibetan Buddhism) in the score, as Loknath said "When Guliga daiva enters into Shiva, the protagonist, I have employed this concept to bring in the religiosity. Though this is a foreign element, I ensured it doesn’t harm the authenticity of the practice." The team took guidance from Mime Ramdas, by which folklore music being represented using Jaanapada songs and traditional instruments. Songs that were popular among the Adivasis were used as a part of the album and score.

== Release ==
The only song to be released as a single prior to the film, was "Singara Siriye" written by Pramod Maravanthe and sung by Vijay Prakash and Ananya Bhat, released on Independence Day (15 August 2022). The music video, which released after the film, featured veteran Yakshagana artiste Nagraj Panar Valtur in the opening of the song, and was known for the Kundapura folk songs sung by women. Shetty wanted Naga to sing a song around winnowing and the tune was sent to Loknath, who blended it into the song. He added "The shooting for the song has taken place in the roads of my hometown, and I have a lot of memories connected with every street. All of this is brought out in the love track."

The full soundtrack was released after the film, by Hombale Films on 12 October 2022 to digital streaming providers, featuring all the tracks as heard in the film. Excluding one song — the Tulu version of "Vaa Poruluya", being added to the album as a bonus song on 18 October. The Hindi, Telugu, Tamil and Malayalam dubbed versions of the soundtrack were released on 24 October 2022.

== Reception ==
The music received critical praise for the composition and instrumentation, which captured the ethnicity of folklore and the traditions. The Hindu's Muralidhara Kajane said that Loknath's music represents the ethos of the land. India Today's Janani K and The Times of India's Sridevi S called the music as "explosive" and "soothing". Calling his score as "marvellous", A Sharadhaa of Cinema Express "While his folk melodies are soothing, the background score accentuates the narrative of Kantara."

== Track listing ==
Kannada
No.	Title	Lyrics	Singer(s)	Length
1.	"Singara Siriye"	Pramod Maravanthe	Vijay Prakash, Ananya Bhat	4:42
2.	"Rebel Song"	Shashiraj Kavoor	Mime Ramdas, Rishab Shetty	3:19
3.	"Karma Song"	Trilok Trivikrama	Venkatesh DC	3:03
4.	"Varaha Roopam Deiva Va Rishtam"	Shashiraj Kavoor	Sai Vignesh	4:36
5.	"Vaa Poruluya"	Shashiraj Kavoor	B. Ajaneesh Loknath, Mime Ramdas	3:19
6.	"Vaa Poruluya" (Tulu version)	Shashiraj Kavoor	B. Ajaneesh Loknath, Mime Ramdas	3:15
Total length:				22:14

Hindi
No.	Title	Lyrics	Singer(s)	Length
1.	"Khawabon Mein"	Akshay Punse	Nakash Aziz, Chinmayi	4:38
2.	"Le Le Le Le Lega"	Akshay Punse	Shatadru Kabir	3:12
3.	"Qismat Jo"	Akshay Punse	Venky DC	3:02
4.	"Varaha Roopam Deiva Va Rishtam"	Shashiraj Kavoor	Sai Vignesh	4:36
5.	"Vaa Poruluya"	Shashiraj Kavoor	Mime Ramadas	3:13
6.	"Meri Jaaniye"	Akshay Punse	Munawwar Ali, Saumya	4:42
Total length:				23:23

Telugu
No.	Title	Lyrics	Singer(s)	Length
1.	"Andhaala Nadhive"	Bhaskarabhatla Ravikumar	Haricharan, Chinmayi	4:41
2.	"Kaakulainaa Dhooraleni"	Bhaskarabhatla Ravikumar	Hemanth Kumar	3:11
3.	"Karme Rayiga"	Gosala Ramababu	Sri Krishna	2:57
4.	"Varaha Roopam Deiva Va Rishtam"	Shashiraj Kavoor	Sai Vignesh	4:32
5.	"Vaa Poruluya"	Shashiraj Kavoor	Mime Ramadas	3:12
Total length:				18:36

Tamil
No.	Title	Lyrics	Singer(s)	Length
1.	"He Semmandha Azhage"	Palani Bharathi	Haricharan, Chinmayi	4:44
2.	"Aanamale Kaatukulla"	Palani Bharathi	Gold Devaraj	3:12
3.	"Manidhanin Payanathil"	Palani Bharathi	Venky DC	2:57
4.	"Varaha Roopam Deiva Va Rishtam"	Shashiraj Kavoor	Sai Vignesh	4:36
5.	"Vaa Poruluya"	Shashiraj Kavoor	Mime Ramadas	3:13
Total length:				18:44

Malayalam
No.	Title	Lyrics	Singer(s)	Length
1.	"Chinkaarakkiliye"	Santhosh Varma	Haricharan, Bhadra Rajin	4:42
2.	"Le Le Le Le (Folk)"	Santhosh Varma	Athul Narakura	3:17
3.	"Karishila Kollave"	Santhosh Varma	Steven	3:05
4.	"Varaha Roopam Deiva Va Rishtam"	Shashiraj Kavoor	Sai Vignesh	4:36
5.	"Vaa Poruluya"	Shashiraj Kavoor	Mime Ramadas	3:19
Total length:				19:01

== Controversy ==
Although the music was critically well received, Rishab Shetty and the production house Hombale Films were accused for copyright infringement as the song "Varaha Roopam" was lifted from the tune of "Navarasam" from Thaikkudam Bridge's eponymous album released in 2015. On 28 October 2022, the Kerala High Court claimed that song could not be used without obtaining permission from Thaikkudam Bridge, thereby instructing them to stop playing the song in theatres and streaming platforms, and on that November, the song video was removed from YouTube. During the digital premiere of the film in Amazon Prime Video on 24 November 2022, the song was replaced with a newer version of the track, with the tune being changed. This led to criticism from a section of fans, as they believed that it took away "the soul of the film" and initiated to restore the original version. The original song was later restored after the district court lifted its ban, citing lack of jurisdiction. The case was finally dismissed by the Kerala High Court on 25 October 2023, after both sides confirmed that they have reached a private settlement.
