= KGF: Chapter 2 (soundtrack) =

2022 soundtrack album by Ravi Basrur

- Soundtrack album cover

Soundtrack album by Ravi Basrur
- Released: 16 April 2022
- Recorded: 2019–2022
- Genre: Feature film soundtrack
- Length: 16:25
- Language: Kannada
- Label: Lahari Music; T-Series; MRT Music (Hindi)
- Producer: Ravi Basrur; Bharath Madhusudhanan; Sachin Basrur

Ravi Basrur chronology
Abbara (2022)	KGF: Chapter 2 (2022)	Kabzaa (2023)
External audio
- Audio Jukebox on YouTube

Singles from KGF: Chapter 2
- 1. "Toofan" Released: 21 March 2022; 2. "Gagana Nee" Released: 6 April 2022; 3. "Sulthana" Released: 13 April 2022; 4. "Mehabooba" Released: 14 April 2022; 5. "The Monster Song" Released: 24 April 2022

KGF: Chapter 2 is the soundtrack album, composed by Ravi Basrur, to the 2022 Indian Kannada language period action film of the same name directed by Prashanth Neel starring Yash.

== Production ==
Music sessions of the film began in April 2019, at Basrur's newly renovated recording studio in Bangalore. However, music production was disrupted in mid-March 2020 due to the COVID-19 pandemic, which was resumed during that May. After work on the film's music and score being completed, Basrur later edited the score and songs, during mid-2021. The Naik Brothers (Laxman and Sandesh Datta), recorded two songs "Toofan" and "Sultan", used in the Hindi-dubbed version of the film. They stated "We went there and he dubbed four songs in Telugu and Kannada in our voice. Later, COVID-19 lockdown happened. After a long wait of two years, they recorded two songs for the Hindi dubbed version titled Toofan and Sultan and finalised for the movie".

== Release ==
The music rights for KGF: Chapter 2 were bought by Lahari Music and T-Series for ₹7.2 crore (US$850,000) for south languages. The music rights of Hindi version was bought by MRT Music. On 21 March 2022, the first single titled "Toofan" was released from the album. The song depicts the rise of Rocky (Yash) as a saviour of enslaved people in the gold mines of Kolar, as depicted in the predecessor's plot. It crossed over 26 million views within 24 hours of its release. On 6 April 2022, the second single titled "Gagana Nee" was released, On 13 April 2022, the third single titled "Sulthana" was released. On 14 April 2022, the fourth single titled "Mehabooba" was released. On 16 April 2022, the makers released the soundtrack album, containing four songs. On 24 April 2022, the fifth single titled "The Monster Song" was also released.

== Track listing ==
=== Kannada ===
No.	Title	Lyrics	Singer(s)	Length
1.	"Toofan"	Ravi Basrur	Santhosh Venky, Mohan Krishna, Sachin Basrur, Ravi Basrur, Puneeth Rudranag, Varsha Acharya, Giridhar Kamath, Raksha Kamath, Sinchana Kamath, Nishanth Kini, Bharath Bhat, Anagha Nayak, Avani Bhat, Swathi Kamath, Shivanand Nayak, Keerthana Basrur	3:34
2.	"Gagana Nee"	Kinnal Raj	Suchetha Basrur	2:57
3.	"Sulthana"	Ravi Basrur	Santhosh Venky, Mohan Krishna, Sachin Basrur, Ravi Basrur, Puneeth Rudranag, Manish Dinakar, Varsha Acharya	3:48
4.	"Mehabooba"	Kinnal Raj	Ananya Bhat	3:34
5.	"The Monster Song"	Aditi Sagar	Aditi Sagar	2:40
Total length:				16:25

=== Telugu ===
No.	Title	Lyrics	Singer(s)	Length
1.	"Toofan"	Ramajogayya Sastry	Sri Krishna, Prudhvi Chandra, Arun Kaundinya, Bhaskaruni Sai Charan, Santhosh Venky, Mohan Krishna, Sachin Basrur, Ravi Basrur, Puneeth Rudranag, Manish Dinakar, Harini Ivaturi, Giridhar Kamath, Raksha Kamath, Sinchana Kamath, Nishanth Kini, Bharath Bhat, Anagha Nayak, Avani Bhat, Swathi Kamath, Shivanand Nayak, Keerthana Basrur	3:34
2.	"Yadagara Yadagara"	Ramajogayya Sastry	Suchetha Basrur	2:57
3.	"Sulthana"	Ramajogayya Sastry	Sai Krishna, Prudhvi Chandra, Arun Kaundinya, Sai Charan, Santhosh Venky, Mohan Krishna, Sachin Basrur, Ravi Basrur, Puneeth Rudranag, Manish Dinakar, Harini Ivaturi, Sarwar Khan	3:48
4.	"Mehabooba"	Ramajogayya Sastry	Ananya Bhat	3:34
5.	"The Monster Song"	Aditi Sagar	Aditi Sagar	2:40
Total length:				16:25

=== Hindi ===
Toofan
No.	Title	Lyrics	Singer(s)	Length
1.	"Toofan"	Shabbir Ahmed	Brijesh Shandilya, Mohan Krishna, Laxman Datta Naik, Saaj Bhatt, Santhosh Venky, Sandesh Datta Naik, Sachin Basrur, Ravi Basrur, Puneeth Rudranag, Priyanka Bharali, Giridhar Kamath, Raksha Kamath, Sinchana Kamath, Nishanth Kini, Bharath Bhat, Anagha Nayak, Avani Bhat, Swathi Kamath, Shivanand Nayak, Keerthana Basrur	3:38
2.	"Falak Tu Garaj Tu"	Deepak V Bharti	Suchetha Basrur	3:03
3.	"Sulthan"	Shabbir Ahmed	Brijesh Shandilya, Mohan Krishna, Laxman Datta Naik, Saaj Bhatt, Santhosh Venky, Sandesh Datta Naik, Sachin Basrur, Ravi Basrur, Puneeth Rudranag, Manish Dinakar, Priyanka Bharali	3:48
4.	"Mehabooba"	Shabbir Ahmed	Ananya Bhat	3:34
5.	"The Monster Song"	Aditi Sagar	Aditi Sagar	2:40
Total length:				16:29

=== Tamil ===
No.	Title	Lyrics	Singer(s)	Length
1.	"Toofan"	Madhurakavi	Deepak Blue, Govind Prasad, Yogisekar, Mohan Krishna, Santhosh Venky, Sachin Basrur, Ravi Basrur, Puneeth Rudranag, Vaish, Giridhar Kamath, Raksha Kamath, Sinchana Kamath, Nishanth Kini, Bharath Bhat, Anagha Nayak, Avani Bhat, Swathi Kamath, Shivanand Nayak, Keerthana Basrur	3:34
2.	"Agilam Nee"	Madhurakavi	Ananya Bhat	2:57
3.	"Sulthana"	Madhurakavi	Deepak Blue, Govind Prasad, Yogisekar, Mohan Krishna, Santhosh Venky, Sachin Basrur, Ravi Basrur, Puneeth Rudranag, Manish Dinakar, Vaish	3:48
4.	"Mehabooba"	Madhurakavi	Ananya Bhat	3:34
5.	"The Monster Song"	Aditi Sagar	Aditi Sagar	2:40
Total length:				16:25

=== Malayalam ===
No.	Title	Lyrics	Singer(s)	Length
1.	"Toofan"	Sudhamsu	Mohan Krishna, Anwar Sadath, M.T. Sruthikanth, Vipin Xavier, Prakash Mahadevan, Santhosh Venky, Aishwarya Rangarajan, Giridhar Kamath, Raksha Kamath, Sinchana Kamath, Nishanth Kini, Bharath Bhat, Anagha Nayak, Avani Bhat, Swathi Kamath, Shivanand Nayak, Keerthana Basrur	3:34
2.	"Gaganam Nee"	Sudhamsu	Anna Baby	2:57
3.	"Sulthana"	Sudhamsu	Mohan Krishna, Anwar Sadath, M.T. Sruthikanth, Vipin Xavier, Prakash Mahadevan, Santhosh Venky, Aishwarya Rangarajan	3:48
4.	"Mehabooba"	Sudhamsu	Ananya Bhat	3:34
5.	"The Monster Song"	Aditi Sagar	Aditi Sagar	2:40
Total length:				16:25

== Album credits ==
=== Original soundtrack ===
Credits adapted from Lahari Music

=== Song writer(s) ===
- Ravi Basrur (Composer, Arranger)

=== Performers ===
- Composition, production, musical arrangements, recording, mixing, mastering – Ravi Basrur
- Lyrics – Ravi Basrur, Shabbir Ahmed, Ramajogayya Sastry, Madhurakavi, Sudhamsu, Kinnal Raj, Deepak V Bharti, Aditi Sagar
