= Ganavi Laxman =

Indian Kannada film and television actress

- Born: 4 July 1992 (age 33); Chikkamagaluru, Karnataka, India
- Occupations: Film actress; Television artist

Ganavi Laxman is an Indian Kannada film and television actress well known for her roles in television serials such as Magalu Janaki.

== Early life ==
Ganavi Laxman was born in the coffee town of Chikmagalur on 4 July 1992.

== Career ==
Ganavi Laxman's career started in the popular television serial Magalu Janaki which aired on Colors Super channel. She debuted in Sandalwood with a leading role in Hero (2021), opposite Rishab Shetty, who also produced the film. Her Big Budget movie debut happened in 2022 with Harsha's Vedha movie in which she played role as Pushpa, wife of Vedha donned by Hatrick Hero Shivarajkumar. Vedha was a big hit and Ganavi's excellent performance as a rebellious village woman who fought and died against the evil was very much appreciated.

She started her career in Tollywood (Telugu cinema) with Rudrangi (2023) as the eponymous role. This thriller is set in the 1940s about a ruthless King Bheem Rao Deshmukh who oppressed the women and his subjects. The movie featured Jagapathi Babu, Ashish Gandhi and Mamta Mohandas in significant roles.

Ganavi is currently shooting for her new film Nanagu Hendti Beku. This project is directed and written by K Shankar. This movie includes Tabla Nani, Bank Janardhan, Killer Venkatesh, Chaithra Kotoor and Ganesh Rao in prominent roles.

== Television career ==
Year	Serial	Role	Channel
2018–2020	Magalu Janaki	Janaki	

== Filmography ==
Year	Film	Role	Language	Notes
2021	Hero	Heroine	Kannada	Debut film
2022	Vedha	Pushpa	Kannada	Nominated- Filmfare Award for Best Actress- Kannada
2022	Bhavachitra	Chitra	Kannada	
2023	Rudrangi	Rudrangi	Telugu	
2024	Nanagu Hendti Beku	Upcoming Movie	Kannada	

== See also ==
- List of people from Karnataka
- Kannada cinema
- List of Indian film actresses
- Cinema of India
