= Hero (2021 film) =

2021 Indian Kannada film

- Directed by: M. Bharath Raj
- Written by: M. Bharath Raj; Anirudh Mahesh; Nithesh Nanjundaradhya; Trilok Trivikrama; Rishab Shetty
- Produced by: Rishab Shetty
- Starring: Rishab Shetty; Ganavi Laxman
- Cinematography: Arvind S Kashyap
- Edited by: Pratheek Shetty
- Music by: B. Ajaneesh Loknath
- Production company: Rishab Shetty Films
- Distributed by: Jayanna Films
- Release date: 5 March 2021
- Running time: 125 minutes
- Country: India
- Language: Kannada

Hero is a 2021 Indian Kannada action comedy film written and directed by debutant M. Bharath Raj. The film is produced by Rishab Shetty under the banner Rishab Shetty Films. It features Shetty and debutante Ganavi Laxman in the lead roles. The supporting cast includes Pramod Shetty and Ugram Manju. B. Ajaneesh Loknath composed the music and the cinematography is by Arvind S. Kashyap.

== Plot ==
Rishab, an Arjun Reddy-styled barber, is on a vengeful spree to kill Ganavi, who brokeup with him and married a crime boss named Pramod, who lives in Ashokavana estate. The estate is filled with violence from gang-wars with Pramod's old rival Tiger Ponnappa, who is later killed by Pramod. Ganavi is unhappy with her marriage as Pramod treats her poorly. Rishab leaves for Ashokavana estate for Pramod's haircut where he plans to have Pramod and Ganavi killed.

However, Pramod is killed by a vengeful Ganavi where Rishab becomes the main witness. Rishab learns about Ganavi's ill-treatment and helps her escape. The gang members learn about the duo's involvement in Pramod's death. A chase ensues and they are about to reach the exit, but are later captured by the gang and brought back to the house, intending to kill them. However, Tiger Ponnappa's son arrives and kills all the gang members and tries to kill Ganavi, but Rishab subdues and kills him. Rishab and Ganavi reunite and leave the estate happily.

== Cast ==
The characters have no names and addressed by their profession.

- Rishab Shetty as a barber
- Ganavi Laxman as the crime boss's wife
- Pramod Shetty as a crime boss
- Manjunath Gowda as Tiger Ponnappa's son
- Pradeep Shetty
- Anirudh Mahesh as a doctor

== Production and Release ==
The entire film shot in Chikkamagaluru during COVID-19 pandemic lockdown. The film was announced with the title and first look on 10 September 2020. The film was wrapped on 5 October 2020. The trailer of the film was released on 14 January 2021. The film was released on 5 March 2021 across Karnataka.

== Soundtrack ==
Hero

Soundtrack album by B. Ajaneesh Loknath
- Released: 2021
- Recorded: 2020
- Genre: Soundtrack
- Length: 14:50
- Label: Rishab Shetty Films
- Producer: B. Ajaneesh Loknath

B. Ajaneesh Loknath chronology
Gentleman (2020)	Hero (2021)	Rathnan Prapancha (2021)

The film's background score and the soundtracks are composed by B. Ajaneesh Loknath . The music rights were acquired by Rishab Shetty Films.

No.	Title	Lyrics	Singer(s)	Length
1.	"Nenapina Hudugiye"	Yograj Bhat	Vijay Prakash	02:59
2.	"Edeyinda Dooravagi"	Jayant Kaikini	Harshika Devanathan, Narayan Sharma	3:07
3.	"Baananchinge Oduva Baara"	Yogaraj Bhat	Vasuki Vaibhav	5:32
4.	"Kanasinda Banda Haage"	Trilok Trivikrama	Harshika Devanathan	3:10
Total length:				14:50
