= Vedha (2022 film) =

2022 Indian Kannada film

- Theatrical release poster
- Directed by: Harsha
- Written by: Harsha
- Produced by: Geeta Shiva Rajkumar
- Starring: Shiva Rajkumar; Ganavi Laxman; Shwetha Chengappa; Umashree; Aditi Sagar
- Cinematography: Swamy J. Gowda
- Edited by: Deepu S. Kumar
- Music by: Arjun Janya
- Production companies: Zee Studio; Geeta Pictures
- Release date: 23 December 2022
- Running time: 156 minutes
- Country: India
- Language: Kannada
- Box office: est.₹19.8 crore

Vedha is a 2022 Indian Kannada-language action drama film written & directed by Harsha and produced by Geeta Shivarajkumar under Geeta Pictures in association with Zee Studios. The film stars Shiva Rajkumar in his 125th film, alongside Ganavi Laxman, Umashree, Aditi Sagar, Shwetha Chengappa and Kuri Prathap.

Vedha was released on 23 December 2022, coinciding with Christmas, and received positive reviews from critics, where it became a commercial success at the box office.

== Plot ==
In Mysore, Neela, a woman commuting to her workplace, is harassed by a man in a bus. Neela reaches home and tells shares the incident with her grandmother Raama, a retired Inspector. Raama advises her to read her novel titled Vedha, which revolves around Vedha, a hooligan turned vigilante.

In 1980s, Vedha meets his daughter Kanaka, who is released from prison, and the duo set on a killing spree. They wander from one village to another and kill three persons: Inspector Rudra, Giri and Nanjappa. Vedha also rescues two women from being sold as bonded labourers and punishes those people responsible. Ramaa took charge as the Inspector, and along with constable Govindappa, begins to investigates the incidents and deduces that Vedha and Kanaka are behind this. From a lawyer named Girija, Ramaa learns about Vedha's past.

Past: Vedha leads a happy life with his wife Pushpa and daughter Kanaka. Later, Vedha is sent to prison for three days for a theft committed by Beera. One night in a drunken state, Giri, Beera, Kalaiyan and Nanjappa brutally assault Kanaka. Enraged by this, Pushpa attacks them only to get killed by them. Rudra also helps them to destroy the evidence, and gets Kanaka sent to juvenile prison. After learning this, Vedha kills the witness Chowdappa for false testimony; attacks Rudra (who survives later) and absconds from the village, waiting for Kanaka to get released from prison and exact vengeance.

Present: Vedha and Kanaka arrive to kill Kalaiyan, who later commits suicide out of guilt. They also arrive at Beera's house and decapitates Beera's wife, and later kills Beera. Ramaa arrives, along with Paari, a sex worker, and Vedha's friend Daya. Paari reveals that Daya was also involved in Kanaka's assault, and he was the one who informed their arrival to Beera. Paari also had tried to kill Daya many times, but the latter always managed to escape. Vedha gets enraged and kills Daya, thus avenging the injustice committed against Pushpa and Kanaka. Later, Vedha and Kanaka immerse Pushpa's ashes into the river and continues their vigilante activities.

After listening to Vedha's story, Neela finally gains newfound courage and heads back to work. While heading to her workplace, Neela gets harassed again by the same man in the bus, only for her to stab his penis with a ball pen.

== Cast ==
- Shiva Rajkumar as Vedha
- Bharath Sagar as Rudra
- Ganavi Laxman as Pushpa, Vedha's wife
- Shwetha Chengappa as Paari, a sex worker
- Umashree as Shankri, Vedha's best friend
- Aditi Sagar as Kanaka, Vedha's daughter
- Veena Ponnappa as Inspector Ramaa
- Raghu Shivamogga as Daya, Vedha's friend
- Lasya Nagaraj
- Jaggapa as Chinayya
- Cheluvaraj as Beera
- Prasanna as Nanjappa
- Vinay Bidappa as Giri
- Sanjeev
- Kuri Prathap as a bus conductor

== Soundtrack ==
The music of the film is composed by Arjun Janya. The first single titled "Gillakko Shiva" was released on 27 November 2022. The second single titled "Pushpa Pushpa" was released on 11 December 2022. The third single titled "Junjappa" was released on 15 December 2022. The fourth single titled "Chinnumari" was released on 26 December 2022.

All lyrics are written by V. Nagendra Prasad.

Kannada Track listing
No.	Title	Singer(s)	Length
1.	"Gillakko Shiva"	Mangli	4:04
2.	"Pushpa Pushpa"	Shiva Rajkumar	3:54
3.	"Junjappa"	Mohan Kumar N	3:12
4.	"Chinnumari"	Keerthan Holla	3:07

All lyrics are written by Guru Saran.

Telugu Track listing
No.	Title	Singer(s)	Length
1.	"Pushpa Pushpa"	Vikaram Pitty	3:08
2.	"Junjappa"	Malliga Arjuna	2:56
3.	"Interval Song"	Deepak	3:53
Total length:			9:17

== Release ==
=== Theatrical ===
The film was released theatrically on 23 December 2022. The Telugu dubbed version titled Shiva Vedha was released on 9 February 2023.

=== Home media ===
The digital streaming rights of the film were sold to ZEE5, while the satellite rights of the film were sold to Colors Kannada. The film was digitally premiered on ZEE5 from 10 February 2023 in Kannada, along with the dubbed versions of Hindi, Tamil, Telugu and Malayalam languages.

== Reception ==
Vedha received positive reviews from critics.

Sridevi S of The Times of India wrote "Vedha deals with an untouched, sensitive topic of child abuse. It is a perfect blend of commercial elements with a strong message about the harassment faced by women on a daily basis. The narration could have been better, but the message and stunning performances keep the film afloat." Y. Maheswara Reddy of Bangalore Mirror wrote that the film is "must watch" for Shivarajkumar's fans. Swaroop Kodur of OTTplay wrote "Vedha,, that said, isn't devoid of concerns and one might find the transgression of the film a bit too alarming and implausible, given the sensitivity of the subject matter. But the film has the heart in the right place and aside from all the contrivances, it is an enjoyable watch."

Jagadish Angadi of Deccan Herald wrote "Only the director knows why he set the film in the 1960s and named it as Vedha. There are no justifications for his creative decisions in the film" and "Shivarajkumar’s 100th film Jogayya fell flat after carrying massive hype. His 125th film is all set to meet a similar fate. However, the seasoned actor can’t be blamed for the director’s blunders." Shuklaji from The New Minute wrote "The film is riveting in parts but a majority of it is flawed and compelling only on the surface." Latha Srinivasan of India Today wrote "Vedha is the 125th of Shiva Rajkumar and his fans are definitely not going to be disappointed with this flick."
