= Vikrant Rona (soundtrack) =

2022 soundtrack album by B. Ajaneesh Loknath

- Soundtrack album cover

Soundtrack album by B. Ajaneesh Loknath
- Released: 9 August 2022
- Recorded: 2019–2022
- Genre: Feature film soundtrack
- Length: 18:10
- Language: Kannada
- Label: Lahari Music; T-Series
- Producer: B. Ajaneesh Loknath

B. Ajaneesh Loknath chronology
By Two Love (2022)	Vikrant Rona (2022)	Guru Shishyaru (2022)
External audio
- Audio Jukebox on YouTube

Singles from Vikrant Rona
- 1. "Ra Ra Rakkamma" Released: 23 May 2022; 2. "Lullaby Song - Rajkumari" Released: 2 July 2022; 3. "Hey Fakira" Released: 12 July 2022; 4. "The Devil's Fury - Gumma Banda Gumma Theme" Released: 21 July 2022; 5. "Chikki Bombe" Released: 30 July 2022

Vikrant Rona is the soundtrack album of the 2022 Indian fantasy action-adventure of the same name. B. Ajaneesh Loknath composed the song and background music for the film. The music rights of the film is owned by Lahari Music for South languages and T-Series for Hindi language.

== Development ==
B. Ajaneesh Loknath composed the songs and background score, which marks his first collaboration with Sudeepa. The composition and tuning of the film was started in 2019 and ended in January 2022.

== Release ==
Lahari Music bought the audio rights of Kannada, Telugu, Tamil, and Malayalam versions of the soundtrack album whereas the soundtrack album of its Hindi version were acquired by T-Series.

The single "Ra Ra Rakkamma" served as the first single of the album and was released on 23 May 2022. The second single "Rajkumari" which was written by the director Anup Bhandari was released on 2 July 2022. The third single "Hey Fakira" was released on 12 July 2022. The fourth single "Gumma Banda Gumma" (Devil's Fury Theme Song) was released on 21 July 2022. The fifth single titled "Chikki Bombe" was released on 30 July 2022.

== Track listing ==
Kannada
No.	Title	Lyrics	Singer(s)	Length
1.	"Ra Ra Rakkamma"	Anup Bhandari	Nakash Aziz, Sunidhi Chauhan	3:39
2.	"Lullaby Song - Rajkumari"	Anup Bhandari	Vijay Prakash	3:26
3.	"Hey Fakira"	Anup Bhandari	Sanjith Hegde, Chinmayi, B. Ajaneesh Loknath, Anup Bhandari	2:51
4.	"The Devil's Fury - Gumma Banda Gumma Theme"	Anup Bhandari	Anup Bhandari, Deepak Blue, Harshika Devanath, B. Ajaneesh Loknath	2:13
5.	"Chikki Bombe"	Anup Bhandari	Vijay Prakash, Karthik, Harshika Devanath	3:30
6.	"Deadman's Anthem"	Anup Bhandari	Niranj Suresh	1:12
7.	"The Family Ballad"	Anup Bhandari	Harshika Devanath	1:26
Total length:				18:10

Hindi
No.	Title	Lyrics	Singer(s)	Length
1.	"Ra Ra Rakkamma"	Shabbir Ahmed	Sunidhi Chauhan, Nakash Aziz	3:39
2.	"Lullaby Song - Rajkumari"	Anup Bhandari	Vijay Prakash	3:26
3.	"Hey Fakira"	Anup Bhandari	Sanjith Hegde, Chinmayi, B. Ajaneesh Loknath, Anup Bhandari	2:51
4.	"The Devil's Fury - Gumma Banda Gumma Theme"	Anup Bhandari	Anup Bhandari, Deepak Blue, Harshika Devanath, B. Ajaneesh Loknath	2:13
5.	"Chikki Bambe"	Anup Bhandari	Vijay Prakash, Karthik, Harshika Devanath	3:30
6.	"Deadman's Anthem"	Anup Bhandari	Niranj Suresh	1:12
7.	"The Family Ballad"	Palani Bharathi	Harshika Devanath	1:26
Total length:				18:10

Tamil
No.	Title	Lyrics	Singer(s)	Length
1.	"Ra Ra Rakkamma"	Palani Bharathi	Sunidhi Chauhan, Nakash Aziz	3:39
2.	"Lullaby Song - Rajkumari"	Palani Bharathi	Vijay Prakash	3:26
3.	"Hey Fakira"	Palani Bharathi	Sanjith Hegde, Chinmayi, B. Ajaneesh Loknath, Anup Bhandari	2:51
4.	"The Devil's Fury - Gumma Banda Gumma Theme"	Palani Bharathi, Madhan Kumar	Anup Bhandari, Deepak Blue, Harshika Devanath, B. Ajaneesh Loknath	2:13
5.	"Chinna Ponnu"	Palani Bharathi	Vijay Prakash, Karthik, Harshika Devanath	3:30
6.	"Deadman's Anthem"	Anup Bhandari	Niranj Suresh	1:12
7.	"The Family Ballad"	Palani Bharathi	Harshika Devanath	1:26
Total length:				18:10

Telugu
No.	Title	Lyrics	Singer(s)	Length
1.	"Ra Ra Rakkamma"	Ramajogayya Sastry	Mangli, Nakash Aziz	3:39
2.	"Lullaby Song - Rajkumari"	Ramajogayya Sastry	Vijay Prakash	3:26
3.	"Hey Fakira"	Ramajogayya Sastry	Sanjith Hegde, Chinmayi, B. Ajaneesh Loknath, Anup Bhandari	2:51
4.	"The Devil's Fury - Gumma Banda Gumma Theme"	Ramajogayya Sastry, Madhan Kumar	Anup Bhandari, Deepak Blue, Harshika Devanath, B. Ajaneesh Loknath	2:13
5.	"Sakkanamma"	Ramajogayya Sastry	Vijay Prakash, Karthik, Harshika Devanath	3:30
6.	"Deadman's Anthem"	Anup Bhandari	Niranj Suresh	1:12
7.	"The Family Ballad"	Ramajogayya Sastry	Harshika Devanath	1:26
Total length:				18:10

Malayalam
No.	Title	Lyrics	Singer(s)	Length
1.	"Ra Ra Rakkamma"	Santhosh Varma	Bhadra Rajin, Tippu	3:39
2.	"Lullaby Song - Rajkumari"	Santhosh Varma	Tippu	3:26
3.	"Hey Fakira"	Santhosh Varma	Hesham Abdul Wahab, Chinmayi, B. Ajaneesh Loknath, Anup Bhandari	2:51
4.	"The Devil's Fury - Gumma Banda Gumma Theme"	Santhosh Varma, Fazil	Anup Bhandari, Rakesh Brahmanandan, Harshika Devanath, B. Ajaneesh Loknath	2:13
5.	"Chinna Bomme"	Santhosh Varma	Tippu, Karthik, Bhadra Rajin	3:30
6.	"Deadman's Anthem"	Anup Bhandari	Niranj Suresh	1:12
7.	"The Family Ballad"	Santhosh Varma	Bhadra Rajin	1:26
Total length:				18:10
