= James (2022 film) =

Indian action thriller film

- Theatrical release poster
- Directed by: Chethan Kumar
- Written by: Chethan Kumar
- Produced by: Kishore Pathikonda
- Starring: Puneeth Rajkumar; Priya Anand
- Cinematography: Swamy J. Gowda
- Edited by: Deepu S. Kumar
- Music by: Songs: Charan Raj; Score: V. Harikrishna
- Production company: Kishore Productions
- Release date: 17 March 2022
- Running time: 149 minutes
- Country: India
- Language: Kannada
- Budget: ₹50–70 crore
- Box office: est.₹151 crore

James is a 2022 Indian Kannada-language action thriller film directed by Chethan Kumar and produced by Kishore Pathikonda under Kishore Productions. The film stars Puneeth Rajkumar in his posthumous film and Priya Anand alongside R. Sarathkumar, Srikanth, Anu Prabhakar, Madhusudhan Rao, Mukesh Rishi, Adithya Menon, Avinash, Sadhu Kokila, Chikkanna and John Kokken. The film also marks the second collaboration between Puneeth Rajkumar, Priya Anand and Sarathkumar after Raajakumara. The score and soundtrack were composed by V. Harikrishna and Charan Raj, while the cinematography and editing were handled by Swamy. J. Gowda and Deepu. S. Kumar.

James was theatrically released on 17 March 2022 on the occasion of Puneeth Rajkumar's birthday. The film grossed ₹100 crore within 4 days of release and became the second highest-grossing Kannada film at the time of release, whilst also becoming the fastest Kannada film to gross ₹100 crores at the box office at that time only to be surpassed by K.G.F: Chapter 2 in less than a month. It was also the second Kannada film to gross ₹100 crore in Karnataka with the first being K.G.F: Chapter 1.

== Plot ==
In India, the crime syndicate is divided into three groups: Golden Horse owned by Joseph Anthony, who is operating in Miami; Scorpion owned by Rathanlal, operating in West Bengal; Gayakwad, owned by Jayadev Gayakwad, Jayadev's son Vijay Gayakwad and Vijay's friend Pratap Aras, operating in Bangalore. Vijay is embroiled in a life-threatening situation when unknown assailants sent by Joseph killed Jayadev. Joseph had learned from an informer that Vijay was behind the death of his brothers John, Peter, and Robin and had also sent his son Vicky into a coma.

After realizing that his family is also in danger, Vijay and Pratap appoints Santhosh Kumar, the manager of J-Wings security agency, as his bodyguard due to his skills and tactics in handling his assignments. Santhosh helps Vijay in his business dealings, while also having Rathanlal and his sons killed when they tries to conquer Gayakwad. Vijay requests Santhosh to protect his sister Nisha Gayakwad, who has returned to India after completing her medical studies from Singapore. After an attack, Santhosh and Nisha escape to a village in Madikeri, where Nisha falls for Santhosh. Nisha requests Vijay to accept their relationship, Though reluctant at first, Vijay accepts. At the party, Vijay announces his decision to hand over his business dealings to Nisha, who also introduces Santhosh.

At this point, Santhosh asks Vijay whether he fears anything in his life, only to start a shootout where he kills his other bodyguards and reveals that he was behind Jayadev's assassination so that Vijay could hire him as his bodyguard. At the same time, Joseph's hitmen barge into the party and are shocked to find Santhosh, whom they recognize as James, their nemesis who was presumed dead. One of them informs this to Joseph before getting beheaded by Santhosh. Joseph learns that the informer had lied to Vijay about his brother's death and kills him. Santhosh brings Vijay and Nisha to the security agency's interrogation room. When Nisha insults Santhosh, Santhosh's colleague Rakesh Kumar Pirangi reveals Santhosh's past.

Past: 10 months ago, Santhosh, an Indian Army Major in Kashmir, arrives at Pondicherry with Rakesh for his IAS officer friend Ekanth's wedding, and they meet Santhosh's friends Jagan, Amar and Madan, who are working in various government departments. At the wedding, Jagan reveals to Santhosh that when he took charge as NCB officer, he had arrested John, Robin and Peter for smuggling, led by Golden Horse. Under Vijay, Pratap and Joseph's advice, John, Peter and Robin barge in and kill everyone present at the wedding. Santhosh, who survives due to Rakesh's help, leaves for Miami as James.

Santhosh drags Robin from his birthday party and kills him. Later, Santhosh tracks Peter at his Miami island, where he decapitates him and lures John into his drug lab and brutally finishes him. Santhosh returns to India and is detained by his higher officer, but Santhosh seeks his higher official's approval to destroy the syndicates, to which they agree and their secret mission – MISSION NORC is launched where he arrives at Bangalore and starts planning to bring down the syndicate with the help of his squad officers by opening J-Wings agency.

Present: Vijay escapes from the agency with Joseph and Pratap's help. Santhosh, with Nisha's help, lures Joseph, Vijay, Pratap and their gang into Sangihe Islands, where the squad officers arrest the syndicate members. The film ends with Santhosh saluting the Indian flag with the satisfaction of having accomplished his friends's mission.

== Cast ==
- Puneeth Rajkumar as Santhosh Kumar/James (Voice by Shiva Rajkumar)
- Priya Anand as Nisha Gayakwad
- R. Sarathkumar as Joseph Antony
- Srikanth as Vijay Gayakwad
- Anu Prabhakar as Vijay's wife
- Mukesh Rishi as Rathanlal
- Madhusudhan Rao as Jayadev Gakaywad, Vijay's father
- Adithya Menon as Prathap Aras, Vijay's friend
- Rangayana Raghu as Rakesh Kumar Pirangi, Santhosh's colleague
- Avinash as Santosh's higher officer
- Sadhu Kokila as Santhosh's assistant
- Chikkanna as Madan, chief editor of Janadani newspaper
- Tilak Shekar as Jagan, NCB officer
- Shine Shetty as Ekanth, IAS officer
- Gajapade Harsha as ACP Amar
- Sameeksha as Jessie, Ekanth's fiancée
- Suchendra Prasad as Jessie's father
- Padmaja Rao as Mary, Jessie's mother
- John Kokken as John, Joseph's brother
- Tarak Ponnappa as Peter, Joseph's brother
- Yash Shetty as Robin, Joseph's brother
- Ketan Karande as gang member of Joseph Antony's mafia syndicate
- Vajrang Shetty as Prathap Aras's son
- Mohan Juneja as a rich person in hospital
- Girish as a fake rich person
- Prasanna Baagin as Rathanlal's son
- Vajragiri as Rathanlal's son
- Kavya Shastry as Jagan's wife
- Hamsa as Amar's wife
- Nayana Gowda as Madan's wife
- Shivamani as Joseph's associate
- Anil as Vijay Gaikwad's associate
- Krishna Hebbale as a police officer
- K S Shreedhar as orphanage head
- Amit as Santhosh's associate in the agency
- Baby Aradhya Chandra as Amar's daughter
- Master Anoop as Jagan's son
- Govindegowda as marriage broker
- Swapna as Dechamma
- Sillilalli Anand as the guy at ashram

=== Cameo appearance ===
- All Ok as the rich kid at the bar
- Dattanna as Chowdhury
- Shiva Rajkumar as Anandraj, a soldier
- Raghavendra Rajkumar as Santhosh's orphanage head

=== Cameo appearance in "Trademark" song ===
- Charanraj
- Chandan Shetty
- Rachita Ram
- Ashika Ranganath
- Sreeleela

== Production ==
Prior to his demise, Puneeth had finished most part of the shoot except one song and voice dubbing. The movie team tried its best to retain Puneeth's voice captured during shoot but when it seemed difficult, Shiva Rajkumar, the eldest brother of Puneeth, dubbed for his brother's character in the Kannada version.

=== Casting ===
Priya Anand was signed for the female lead role. The makers also announced that Srikanth, Hareesh Peradi, Mukesh Rishi and Anu Prabhakar would be seen in prominent roles. In 2021, R. Sarathkumar, Tilak Shekar, Shine Shetty, Chikkanna joined the film's cast.

=== Filming ===
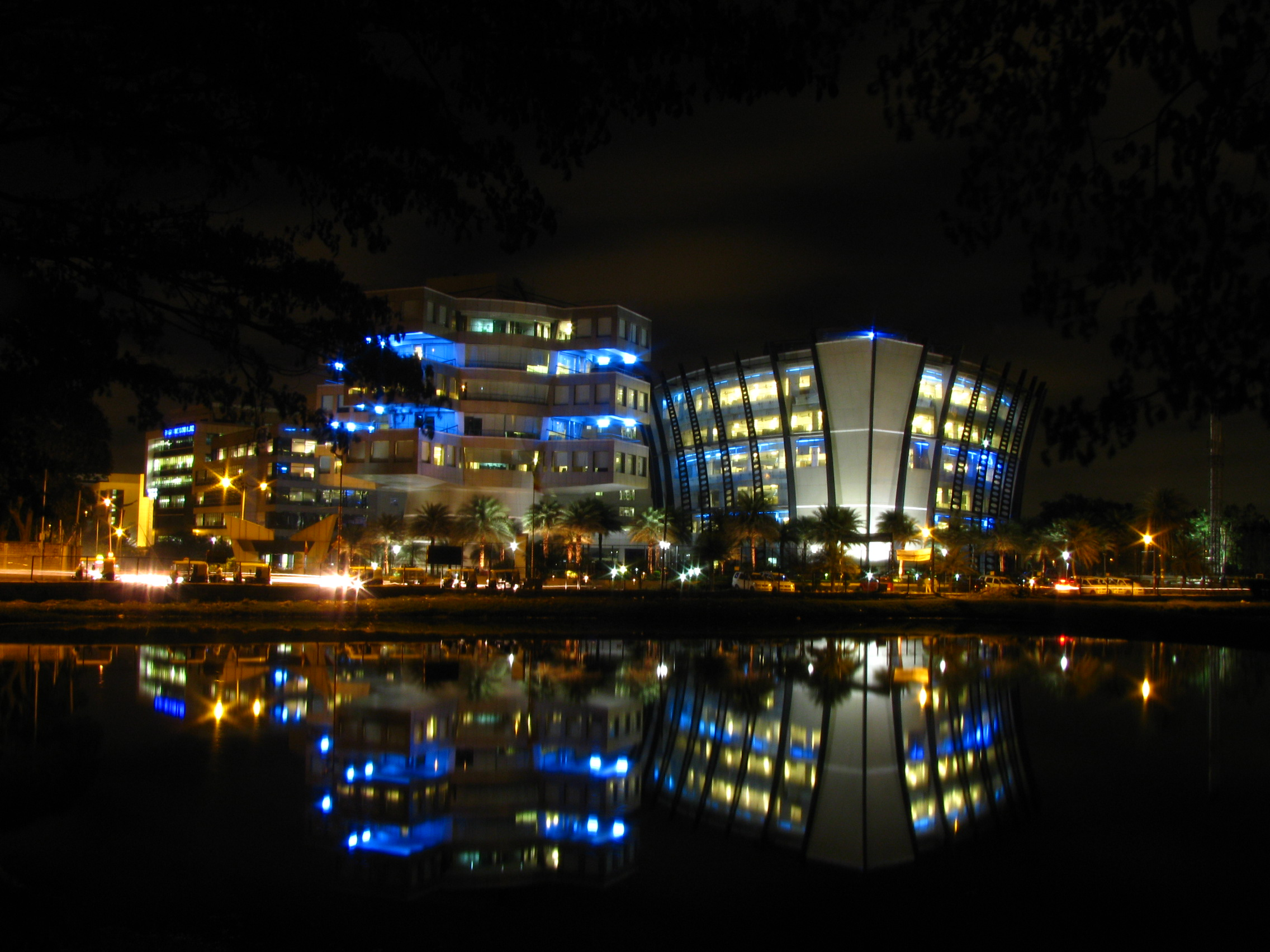
The integral portions of the film has been shot in Bengaluru.

The film is produced by Kishore Pathikonda under the banner Kishore Productions. The first schedule of the shoot started from 19 January 2020 in Bengaluru. The second schedule of the film started from 14 October 2020 in Hampi. A quick schedule was also wrapped in February 2021 in Kashmir featuring important action sequences of Puneeth Rajkumar. After returning from Kashmir, Puneeth became busy in the promotional activities of his other film, Yuvarathnaa which released on 1 April amidst the second wave of the COVID-19 pandemic. The James team resumed shoot once again from 5 July at a brisk pace after the Government of Karnataka gave nod to restart filming activities.

== Music ==
Charan Raj composed the music for the film. Vijeth Krishna composed "Bolo Bolo James".

James

Soundtrack album by Charan Raj
- Released: March 4, 2022
- Recorded: 2021–2022
- Genre: Feature film soundtrack
- Language: Kannada
- Labels: PRK Audio; Divo
- Producer: Charan Raj

Charan Raj chronology
| Salaga (2021) | James (2022) | Sapta Saagaradaache Ello: Side A (2022) |

Singles from James
- 1. "Trademark" Released: 1 March 2022; 2. "Salaam Soldier" Released: 11 March 2022; 3. "Dhikkara Ninage Devare" Released: 11 April 2022; 4. "Naa Ninage Kaavalugaara" Released: 6 June 2022

Track listing
| No. | Title | Lyrics | Singer(s) | Length |
|---|---|---|---|---|
| 1. | "Bolo Bolo James" | Chethan Kumar | Chandan Shetty, Shashank Sheshagiri, Impana Jayaraj, Vijeth Krishna | 1:59 |
| 2. | "Trademark" | Chethan Kumar | MC Vickey, Aditi Sagar, Chandan Shetty, Sharmila, Yuva Rajkumar | 3:59 |
| 3. | "Salaam Soldier" | Chethan Kumar | Sanjith Hegde, Charan Raj | 3:16 |
| 4. | "Dhikkara Ninage Devare" | Chethan Kumar | Charan Raj | 3:33 |
| 5. | "Naa Ninage Kaavalugaara" | Chethan Kumar | Ankita Kundu, Sanjith Hegde | 3:23 |

== Release ==
=== Theatrical ===
The film released in theatres on 17 March 2022 in Kannada alongside dubbed versions in Hindi, Malayalam, Tamil, and Telugu. It released in 4000 screens on the first day including 400 single screen theaters in Karnataka alone and 900 shows in multiplexes making it the biggest release at that time in Karnataka. The Telugu film RRR had postponed its release by one week due to release of this film.

=== Re-release ===
On 18 April 2022, Chethan Kumar announced that a Hyderabad-based team was able to recreate Puneeth's voice using Shivrajkumar's modulation and Puneeth's voice samples from his previous films and hosting endeavors. Kumar announced that consequently James would be re-released in theaters with the new voice on 22 April 2022.

=== Home media ===
The film was released on SonyLIV on 14 April 2022 in Kannada, Telugu, Tamil, Malayalam and Hindi and the satellite rights of the Kannada version were sold to Star Suvarna.

== Reception ==
=== Critical response ===
James received positive reviews from critics.

Sunayana Suresh of The Times of India gave 4/5 stars and wrote "For all of who wanted to see their favourite Appu in his Power-packed Star avatar one last time, James does not disappoint. There are shortcomings, but this film eventually hits the bull's eye in the heart for fans." Prathibha Joy of OTTplay gave 4/5 stars and wrote "James does not have the greatest story, and that is something that his fans will overlook, as they’ve got to see him one last time in a full-fledged film. This is one of the actor’s most massy outings, which his fans will love and cherish for time to come."

A. Sharadhaa of The New Indian Express gave 3.5/5 stars and wrote "James definitely is a worthy tribute to the Power Star, and when the final credits roll, and we see Puneeth give us his much-loved smile, it brings a tear to our eyes." Janani. K of India Today gave 3/5 stars and wrote "James is an out-and-out star vehicle and it completely belongs to Power Star Puneeth Rajkumar."

The Hans India gave 2.5/5 stars and called it an "action-packed entertainer." Sankeertana Varma of Firstpost gave 2.5/5 stars and said that the film is "impressively shot and edited" and praised the production values and noted that the sets are "classy and pristine".

Vivek M. V of Deccan Herald praised the film for its high octane slick action sequences. Shuklaji of The News Minute wrote "James may appear tad cliched for some but it shines through as a sincere ode to the legacy of Puneeth Rajkumar and his ever-growing fandom."

Manoj Kumar. R of The Indian Express wrote "One can't escape the strong sense of melancholy that comes with the knowledge of the fact that it will be the last time one would see Puneeth Rajkumar dance, fight, smile, cry and deliver punchlines." Subha. J. Rao of Film Companion wrote ""The late actor had great hope from James and you understand why. The team has managed to put together an action entertainer despite the difficult circumstances of the star’s passing."

=== Box office ===
James was estimated to have grossed ₹28 to ₹32 crore on its first day which was the highest opening day domestic box office collections for a Kannada film at that time. It was reported to have grossed ₹6 crore from Bangalore alone – marking it the first time a film has grossed above ₹4 crore in the city on its opening day. The net collections at the end of the first day was reported to be around ₹18 crore to ₹22.5 crore.

It was reported to have grossed ₹10 crore on the second day with the total gross around ₹37 crore to ₹45 crore in 2 days. It was speculated that the gross theatrical collections for 3 days to be around ₹54 crore with a net collections of ₹ 38 crore for the same period. The net collections for 4 days was reported to be around ₹50 crore. Multiple media outlets reported that the film had grossed ₹100 crore within 4 days The film grossed more than ₹125 crore within 6 days of its release and it grossed ₹151 crore at the box office.

== See also ==
- List of highest-grossing Kannada films
