= Mohan Kumar N =

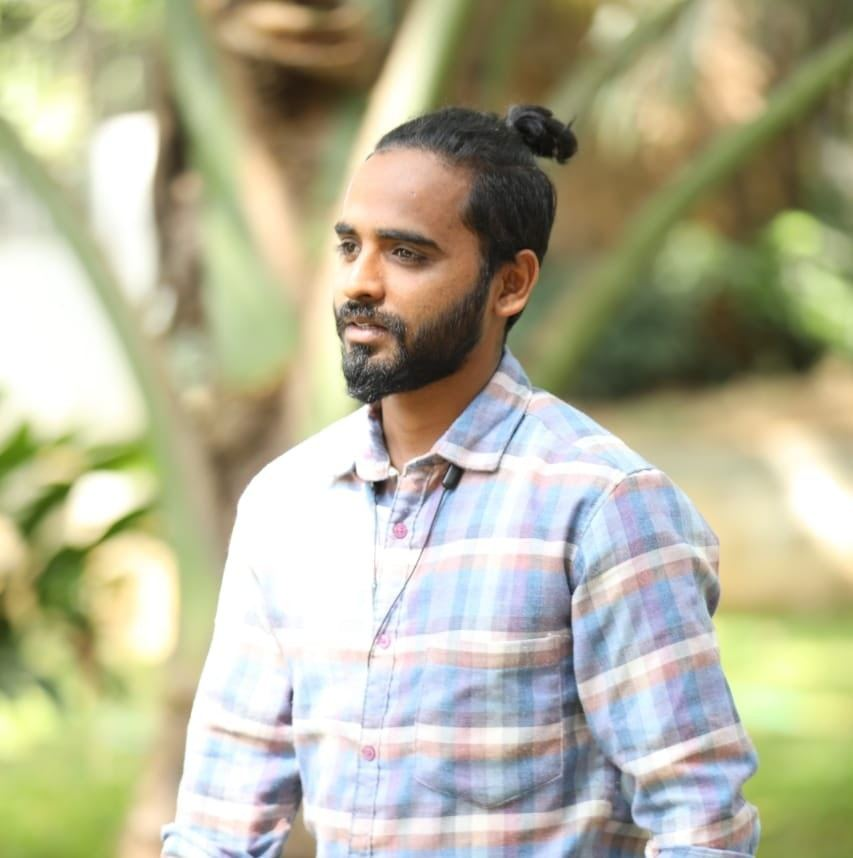

Background information
- Born: Mohan Kumar N 1990 (age 30-31) Tambuganahatti village in Tumakuru, Karnataka, India
- Occupation(s): folk singer and Playback singer, writer

Mohan Kumar N is a young folk artiste and writer Mohan Kumar N has documented around a thousand folk songs, especially Kadu Gollara, Kolata, Gane and Sobana Padagalu over the last decade, and is also teaching it to students across the state. He had worked with musicians such as Hamsalekha, Arjun Janya, V.Manohar, Vasu Dixit and other popular music directors.
