= Nallandi =

Indian farmer

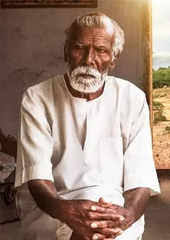
- Portrait of Nallandi
- Born: 14 October 1937; Usilampatti, Tamil Nadu, India
- Died: 1 February 2022 (aged 84)
- Occupations: Farmer, Actor

Nallandi (14 October 1937–1 February 2022) was an Indian farmer and actor. He rose to prominence shortly before his death by portraying the character of Maayandi in the Tamil film Kadaisi Vivasayi, which also starred Vijay Sethupathi.

== Film career ==
Nallandi was cast as the lead in Kadaisi Vivasayi after the director M. Manikandan "needed someone who also knew farming because I wanted to show the different processes involved in farming". Regarding his performance in the film, a critic wrote that "Nallandi, who is unfortunately no more, is brilliant, especially when he is separated from his cattle and crops after landing in jail for a crime he never did. The sadness is reflected in his eyes".

At the 69th National Film Awards-Special Mention, his character in Kadaisi Vivasayi received a Special Mention. His performance as Maayandi in the lead role received critical acclaim.

== Death ==
Nallandi died in 2022, shortly before the release of Kadaisi Vivasayi, as a result of age-related difficulties.
