= Aditi Sagar =

Indian singer

- Born: Adithi Sagar; 15 July 2003 (age 22); Bengaluru, Karnataka
- Occupation: Singer/Actress
- Years active: 2019–present
- Parent(s): Arun Sagar (father), Meera Arun (mother)

Adithi Sagar is an Indian singer who works in the Kannada film industry. Her songs "Dum Maro Dum" from Raambo 2 (2018), "The Bengaluru Song" from French Biriyani (2020), and "The Monster Song" from K.G.F: Chapter 2 (2022) garnered popularity upon release.

== Career ==
Adithi Sagar made her singing debut at the age of 14 with Dum Maro Dum in Raambo 2 (2018) . She received the opportunity after a producer of the film, Tarun Sudhir, heard her rendition of Aacharavillada Naalige on her YouTube channel and recognized her talent. She was studying in the ninth standard when she landed the role. She went on to sing the song "Samshaya" in the film Kavaludaari (2019). In a review of the film, a critic noted that "young Aditi Sagar's Samshaya echoes long after the closing credits roll". She rapped in "The Bengaluru Song" from French Biriyani (2020). Vasuki Vaibhav, the composer for the film, had trouble finding a female rapper before he zeroed in on Sagar.

Her debut as an actress was through Shiva Rajkumar's 125th Vedha, directed by A. Harsha. She plays the role of Kanaka, daughter of Vedha in the action drama film.

== Personal life ==
She is the younger daughter of actor, art director Arun Sagar.

== Filmography ==
Year	Film	Role(s)	Notes
2020	French Biriyani		Special appearance in The Bengaluru Song
2022	K.G.F: Chapter 2		Special Appearance in The Monster Song
2022	Vedha	Kanaka	

== Discography ==
Year	Film	Song	Composer	Co-singers	Lyricist	Notes
2018	Raambo 2	"Dum Maro Dum"	Arjun Janya		Muthu	
2019	Kavaludaari	"Samshaya"	Charan Raj		Dhananjay Ranjan	
2019	Arishadvarga	"Anvartha"	Udit Haritas		Pawan Kumar R	
2019	Babru	"Kaalada Kadalali"	Poornachandra Tejaswi		Dr. K.S Narasimhaswamy	
2019	Katha Sangama	"Manasina Olage"	Agnata		Mayasandra Krishna Prasad	
2020	French Biriyani	"The Bengaluru Song"	Vasuki Vaibhav		Vasuki Vaibhav, Avinash Balekkala	Special appearance in music video
2021	Puksatte Lifu Pursotte Illa	"Swami Sharanam Ayyappa"	Vasu Dixit	Vasu Dixit	K. Kalyan	
2022	James	"Trademark"	Charan Raj	Chethan Kumar, MC Vickey, Chandan Shetty, Sharmila, Yuva Rajkumar	Chethan Kumar	
2022	K.G.F: Chapter 2	"The Monster Song"	Ravi Basrur		Herself	Special appearance in music video
2024	Not Out	"Dukha Dugudagala"	Judah Sandhy		Ambarisha M	

== Awards and nominations ==
Year	Film	Award	Category	Work	Result	Ref.
2019	Raambo 2	66th Filmfare Awards South	Best Female Playback Singer	"Dum Maro Dum"	Nominated	
2020	Kavaludaari	"Chandanavana Film Critics Academy Awards"	Best Singer (Female)	"Samshaya"	Won	
2020	Kavaludaari	Mirchi Music Awards South	Female Vocalist of The Year - Kannada	"Samshaya"	Won	
2021	French Biriyani	2nd Chandanavana Film Critics Academy Awards	Best Female Singer	"The Bengaluru Song"	Nominated	
2021	French Biriyani	South Indian International Movie Awards	Best Female Singer	"The Bengaluru Song"	Won	
2023	K.G.F chapter 2	Chitrasanthe Film Awards	Best Cover Song	"The Monster Song"	Won	
2023	Vedha	South Indian International Movie Awards	Best Actress in a Supporting Role	"Vedha"	Nominated	
