= Kadaisi Vivasayi =

2022 Indian drama film

- Theatrical release date poster
- Directed by: M. Manikandan
- Written by: M. Manikandan
- Produced by: M. Manikandan
- Starring: Nallandi
- Cinematography: M. Manikandan
- Edited by: B. Ajithkumar
- Music by: Santhosh Narayanan; Richard Harvey
- Production company: Tribal Arts Production
- Distributed by: Vijay Sethupathi Productions; 7Cs Entertainment
- Release date: 11 February 2022
- Running time: 144 minutes
- Country: India
- Language: Tamil

Kadaisi Vivasayi (transl. The Last Farmer) is a 2022 Indian Tamil-language comedy drama film by M. Manikandan. It stars Nallandi as an octogenarian farmer, and features Vijay Sethupathi and Yogi Babu in supporting roles. Besides writing and directing, Manikandan produced the film and helmed the cinematography as well.

Kadaisi Vivasayi was released on 11 February 2022 and received widespread critical acclaim but ended up as a box office failure. It won the Best Feature Film In Tamil, Special Mention for Nallandi at the 69th National Film Awards.

== Plot ==
Mayandi is an 80-year-old farmer living a frugal lifestyle in a village near Usilampatti. He talks very little and displays very little emotion. As there are no farmers in the village, the village tasks him with providing the symbolic first grain for the village temple's annual ceremony. The village's other farmers have sold their lands to financiers for future developmental projects. Mayandi plants a new batch of paddy in his field, and one day he finds a peacock and two peahens dead in his cropland. He considers them vehicles of his favourite god, Murugan and buries them in his field. A fellow villager sees him burying the birds. Soon, the police arrest Mayandi for killing a peacock, India's national bird.

It reveals that some years before, someone killed peafowl in the village, and the villagers heckled the investigating police, and there were no witnesses. The police want to avenge their humiliation. They find a witness and file a case against Mayandi, who take him into judicial remand. He is then brought to court and states the facts to the magistrate. On questioning by magistrate, the eyewitness reveals that he saw him bury the birds and not killing them. She reprimands the police for filing a false case and orders them to submit a mistake of fact (MF) report. However, since the police filed a First Information Report(FIR) and filing a MF takes time, the judge orders Mayandi to spend 15 days in jail. Mayandi mentions his newly planted crop that needs regular watering. The magistrate ordered the police constable to water the crop.

The police delay filing the changed report and neglect the field's care while Mayandi's stay in prison gets extended. Mayandi's relatives in the village take pity on the police constable (who is watering the cropland) and agree to take up that task themselves. When pests attack the crop, Mayandi advises them to control them with a traditional spray; however, it is laborious. An agrochemical dealer in Mayandi's village instead recommends that Mayandi's relative buy a pesticide. Mayandi escapes while waiting for his hearing and discovers the destroyed crop. The magistrate finds him in the field and tries to hasten a speedy release while ensuring support for a new crop to be planted and raised in time for the festival. The festival itself involves Ayyanar deities (including Karuppu Sami), who are appeased by a coming together of all the caste groups in the society, including the village potter, who has nearly lost his livelihood.

There are two side stories. One is that of a villager, Ramaiah. Ramaiah has gone insane following the death of his love. At several points in the movie, they hint that he is the sane one in a world gone mad. Another is that of Thadikozhanthai and the elephant he bought after selling his land to a financial institution. There are also commentaries on hybrid seeds, industrial animal feed, and other high-input practices destroying sustenance farmers.

== Cast ==
- Nallandi as Mayandi, a farmer
- Muneeshwaran as Karuppan
- Kali Muthu as Suresh
- Chaplin Sundar as Mookan
- Raichal Rabecca as Magistrate Mangaiyarkarasi
- Vijay Sethupathi as Ramaiah
- Yogi Babu as Thadikozhanthai
- Kutty Sornakka as Raakayi

== Production ==
In mid-2016, it was first reported that Manikandan had started to write the script for his next project titled Kadaisi Vivasayi and that it would be produced by Eros International and commenced by the end of the year; but for unknown reasons the filming got delayed. Manikandan later told that he visited over 100 villages to check out filming locations, which itself took over a year. It was revealed that the director had approached Rajinikanth to play the protagonist, but that the veteran actor had turned down the offer. After auditioning several people, Manikandan then decided to cast a real farmer as he needed someone who knew farming and "coexists with nature" and chose Nallandi, whom he found in Perungamanallur, a village near Madurai; Nallandi completed his portions but died shortly before the film's release. In 2018, reports claimed that Vijay Sethupathi, who had previously collaborated with Manikandan on the film Aandavan Kattalai in 2016, was signed up, with Manikandan clarifying that Sethupathi's role was small and that he would not promote the film as a Vijay Sethupathi film. According to Manikandan, all the actors were from the villages. Except for Vijay Sethupathi and Yogi Babu, who was selected for a small role, none of the other actors featured in the film had any prior acting experience.

Filming of Kadaisi Vivasayi was officially confirmed during or about April 2018. The announcement said the plot centered on the importance of agriculture, and that Vijay Sethupathi would play a farmer in a cameo appearance . It was also announced that Vijay Sethupathi had quietly completed his portions in the film in September 2018 while also busy with other films such as Junga and Maamanithan. Vijay Sethupathi would later go on to claim that it was the most difficult role of his career. The entire film was shot in 95 days in and around Usilampatti. Although reports suggested that the film may be released through the over-the-top media service platform SonyLIV, it was later confirmed by the team that it would be theatrically released only.

== Music ==
Kadaisi Vivasayi's score was composed by Santhosh Narayanan and English composer Richard Harvey. Initially Manikandan had signed Ilaiyaraaja as the music director, who had also composed few songs and the background score. According to reports, Manikandan was not satisfied with the music provided by Ilaiyaraaja and had asked him to rework it, which the latter refused, leading to Ilaiyaraaja being replaced by Santhosh Narayanan. Ilaiyaraaja then lodged a complaint against the director with the Music Composer's Association; it was later reported to have been resolved amicably.

Santhosh Narayanan also produced and sang two songs for the film's soundtrack.

1. "Enniko Er Pudichane" – 4:15
2. "Bambara Boomi" – 3:14

== Critical reception ==
Kadaisi Vivasayi released to critical acclaim.

On the review aggregator website Rotten Tomatoes, 100% of 7 critics' reviews are positive, with an average rating of 7.5/10.

Sudhir Srinivasan of New Indian Express gave the film a rating of 4 out of 5 and wrote, "[...] at a time when farmer films are dime a dozen, Kadaisi Vivasaayi manages to stand out effortlessly". Similarly The Indian Express gave it also 4 out of 5, saying, "Vijay Sethupathi, Nallandi shine in Manikandan's meditation on life". Deccan Herald gave it 4 out of 5 as well, describing it as a "terrific film on simple living" that "gives a humbling experience and is easily one of the year's best". In his review for IANS, Manigandan K.R., too, gave the film 4 stars out of 5, deeming it a "gem in a league of its own" and added that it "manages to make its point in the most powerful and compelling manner that one never thought was possible even for films boasting of a big budget and a huge star cast". The Hindu called it "an engaging combination of realism and surrealism" and "perhaps the most poignant" of Manikandan's films. Baradwaj Rangan stated: "We feel the film because Manikandan lets the emotions build slowly and enter us like air", naming it a "film with utmost dignity" and a "beautiful example of how to talk about important things without giving boring lectures". Hindustan Times cited that Kadaisi Vivasayi stood "testimonial to the fact that even a simple story, when told with unparalleled sensitivity, can leave a lasting impact". Ashameera Aiyappan writing for Firstpost noted that the film felt like "a deep breath of air -- wilful and refreshing", while giving it a rating of 3.5 out of 5. Although M. Suganth of The Times of India gave the film 3.5 out of 5, too, he noted that "for all the filmmaking delights that the film offers, something seems to be missing in Kadaisi Vivasayi that stops it from being a truly great film", concluding that the film "never comes together as a whole".

The film was widely considered as one of 2022's best Tamil films and listed in several top films' lists. Other filmmakers including Mysskin, Seeman and H. Vinoth have also appreciated the film. It was selected for the Big Screen Competition at the 2021 International Film Festival Rotterdam and was one of the ten films that were screened at the 2022 Chennai International Film Festival.

== Accolades ==
List of Kadaisi Vivasayi accolades
Award Ceremony	Year	Category	Nominee	Result	Ref.
Ananda Vikatan Cinema Awards	2023	Best Director	M.Manikandan	Won	
Ananda Vikatan Cinema Awards	2023	Best Film	Kadaisi Vivasayi	Nominated	
Ananda Vikatan Cinema Awards	2023	Best Production	Tribal Arts Production	Nominated	
Ananda Vikatan Cinema Awards	2023	Best Cinematographer	M.Manikandan	Nominated	
Ananda Vikatan Cinema Awards	2023	Best Character Artist – Female	Raichal Rabecca	Nominated	
Critics' Choice Film Awards	2023	Best Writing	M.Manikandan	Won	
Critics' Choice Film Awards	2023	Best Director	M.Manikandan	Won	
Critics' Choice Film Awards	2023	Best Feature Film	Kadaisi Vivasayi	Won	
69th National Film Awards	2023	Best Feature Film In Tamil	Kadaisi Vivasayi	Won	
69th National Film Awards	2023	Special Mention	Nallandi	Won	
