= 777 Charlie (soundtrack) =

- Soundtrack album cover

Soundtrack album by Nobin Paul
- Released: 11 March 2023
- Recorded: 2020–2021
- Genre: Feature film soundtrack
- Length: 19:50
- Language: Kannada
- Label: Paramvah Music; Divo
- Producer: Nobin Paul

Singles from 777 Charlie
- 1. "Torture Song" Released: 10 September 2021; 2. "O'Ga" Released: 31 December 2021; 3. "Journey Song" Released: 3 June 2022; 4. "Sahapaati" Released: 1 July 2022; 5. "Bonding Song" Released: 15 July 2022

777 Charlie is the soundtrack album to the 2022 Kannada film of the same name which was produced by Rakshit Shetty and GS Gupta under the banner of Paramvah Studios and also features him, Sangeetha Sringeri and Raj B. Shetty in prominent roles. The score and soundtrack to 777 Charlie was composed and produced by Nobin Paul.

== Development ==
Paul had revealed that he worked on the film's soundtrack in August 2020 in his recording studio in Kochi, as he regularly collaborate with the musicians based on the city. Since the recording of the songs had been held through online due to the COVID-19 pandemic induced lockdown, Paul felt that "it was best if it was done in his presence, so that any issues can be sorted out then and there". After the Kerala government announced relaxations from the pandemic, he travelled to Kochi for beginning work on the music sessions for a month and then travelled to Bangalore, Chennai and London. Paul had finished composition of all the songs of the film even before the team planned to do vocal recordings.

777 Charlie's soundtrack will reportedly have 8-10 songs. The film will have multiple instrumental tracks which will be included in the background score of the film. Considering that the film will be dubbed in five languages, Paul had to work on the recording for five times per language, and had planned to get singers who can do maximum versions. Each song has been composed keeping a particular situation in mind and retained the uniqueness in each flavour. Eight of the songs from the album had been re-written and recorded in other languages, as the team planned to retain the authenticity and flavour maintained in each song when it has been released in other languages. Paul had also revealed that one song featured vocals entirely by kids.

== Release ==
The first single titled "Torture Song" was released on the occasion of Ganesh Chaturthi (10 September 2021). The track was reportedly sung by different singers for the respective languages, which include Vijay Prakash, Ram Miriyala, Gana Balachander, Jassie Gift and Swaroop Khan. The music video also released on the same day, which depicts how Charlie's arrival creates havoc in Dharma's (Shetty) life leading him to face several troubles.

The second single track "O'Ga" was released on New Year's Eve (31 December 2021). A Konkani language folk song, it was sung by Goan singer Dhiti Lotlikar, whom Kiranraj had watched her songs in social media platforms and enquired Shetty to croon one of the tracks, that needed a flavour of Goa. Kiranraj had stated that "the song captures the spirit of traveling and an intense journey, and the visuals show just that. When I spoke to Rakshit, the producer, a few others from the team, everyone agreed with glee and we went ahead with a one-of-a-kind Goan song." Guitarist Vian Fernandes of Thaikkudam Bridge band also worked on the track and made an appearance.

The third single track "Journey Song" was released on 3 June 2022. Post the film's release, two more singles: "Sahapaati" and "Bonding Song" were released on 1 and 15 July, respectively. However, the album in its entirety was not released until March 2023.

== Track listing ==
Kannada
No.	Title	Lyrics	Singer(s)	Length
1.	"Torture Song"	Nagarjun Sharma	Vijay Prakash	5:11
2.	"O'Ga"	Saiesh Poi Panandikar	Dhiti Lotlikar	2:33
3.	"Journey Song"	Kiran Kaverappa	Jassie Gift, Abhinandan Mahishale	3:16
4.	"Sahapaati"	Keerthan Bhandary	Aarna Shetty, Pooja Rao, Meghana Kulkarni Joshi	4:21
5.	"Bonding Song"	Nagarjun Sharma	Pancham Jeeva	4:29
Total length:				19:50

Tamil
No.	Title	Lyrics	Singer(s)	Length
1.	"Torture Song"	Madhurakavi	Gana Balachander	5:10
2.	"Journey Song"	Mohan Rajan	Jassie Gift, Aravind Karneeswaran	3:16
3.	"Anbu Thozha"	Madhurakavi	Sai Veda Vagdevi, Pooja Rao, Meghana Kulkarni Joshi	4:21
4.	"Bonding Song"	Madhurakavi	Haricharan	4:29
Total length:				17:18

Telugu
No.	Title	Lyrics	Singer(s)	Length
1.	"Torture Song"	Battu Vijaykumar	Ram Miriyala	5:10
2.	"Journey Song"	Battu Vijaykumar	Ram Miriyala, Abhinandan Mahishale	3:16
3.	"Sahachari"	Poorna Chary	Sai Veda Vagdevi, Pooja Rao, Meghana Kulkarni Joshi	4:21
4.	"Bonding Song"	Nagarjun Sharma	Haricharan	4:29
Total length:				17:16

Hindi
No.	Title	Lyrics	Singer(s)	Length
1.	"Torture Song"	Shiny Das	Swaroop Khan	5:12
2.	"Journey Song"	Mansa Pandey	Swaroop Khan, Abhinandan Mahishale	3:16
3.	"Mere Yaara"	Shiny Das	Sai Veda Vagdevi, Pooja Rao, Meghana Kulkarni Joshi	4:21
4.	"Bonding Song"	Karthika Nainan Dubey	Virashish Thapa	4:29
5.	"The Hymn of Dharma"	Mansa Pandey	Shubham Roy	4:48
6.	"Theher Jaa"	Karthika Nainan Dubey	Javed Ali	4:36
7.	"Escape Song"	Alexis D'Souza	Lonnie Park
8.	"Pathos Song"	Karthika Nainan Dubey	Armaan Malik
9.	"Kattey Song (Rajasthani Folk)"	Folk	Madhuri Seshadri
10.	"Farmhouse Song"	Kashyap Rammohan	Lavita Lobo
Total length:				17:18

Malayalam
No.	Title	Lyrics	Singer(s)	Length
1.	"Torture Song"	Adithyan VK, Akhil A Bose	Jassie Gift	5:09
2.	"Journey Song"	Titto P. Thankachen	Jassie Gift, Akshay Anilkumar	3:16
3.	"En Sarwame"	Titto P. Thankachen	Ananya Nair, Pooja Rao, Meghana Kulkarni Joshi	4:21
4.	"Bonding Song"	Akhil M. Bose	Vineeth Sreenivasan	4:29
Total length:				17:15
