= Guru Shishyaru (2022 film) =

2022 Indian Kannada language film

- Directed by: Jadesh K. Hampi
- Written by: Masti (dialogues)
- Screenplay by: Jadesh K. Hampi
- Produced by: Sharan; Tharun Sudhir
- Starring: Sharan; Nishvika Naidu
- Cinematography: Aroor Sudhakar Shetty
- Edited by: K. M. Prakash
- Music by: B. Ajaneesh Loknath
- Production companies: Laddu Cinema House; Kreatiivez banner
- Release date: 23 September 2022
- Running time: 155 minutes
- Country: India
- Language: Kannada

Guru Shishyaru is a 2022 Indian Kannada-language sports drama film written and directed by Jadesh K Hampi. The film stars Sharan and Nishvika Naidu in the lead roles and H. G. Dattatreya, Suresh Heblikar and Apurva Kasaravalli in supporting roles. Tharun Sudhir was the creative head and producer for the movie. The team also cast the children of popular actors like Prem, Sharan, Ravi Shankar Gowda, Naveen Krishna, and Late Bullet Prakash, among others.

The movie opened to positive reviews from audience and critics.

== Plot ==
In 1994–95, Manohar. K is a lethargic man and a former Kho kho national champion, who lives with his teacher Guru. After much persuasion by Guru, he joins a school at a village named Bettadapura as a PT teacher and also falls in love with a village girl Sujatha alias Sooji. However, Rudrappa, a swindler pressurises the villagers to give up the land that belonged to his grandparents before the Union government implemented the land to be given to the villagers.

The court decides to ask the two parties to come to an agreement. However, Rudrappa, who is also a gambler, tells that he will withdraw the case if the school students can defeat his players in the yearly Kho-Kho event. Manohar gets into trouble as he and the students actually didn't win any game, but only bought trophies from the sports shop. Before Manohar and the students decide to leave the town, he learns about Guru's death and his desire to see him as a former champion again.

Manohar begins to train them in the sport and also makes them learn about teamwork. After facing many hurdles orchestrated by Rudrappa, Manohar and the students finally defeats Rudrappa's team. With Rudrappa defeated, Manohar and the students happily celebrate with the villagers.

== Cast ==
- Sharan as Manohar aka MK
- Nishvika Naidu as Sujatha aka Sooji
- H. G. Dattatreya as Dattanna
- Suresh Heblikar as Nijaguna Shantappa
- Apurva Kasaravalli as Rudrappa
- Mahanthesh Hiremath as Pampapathi, peon
- Hruday Sharan as Karthik
- MS Jahangir as M.Pranesh, Headmaster
- Ekanth Prem as Seena
- Rakshak Bullet as Basha
- Manikanta Nayak as Veeranna
- Amit as Kirana
- Surya Ravishankar as Joseph
- Harshit Naveen Krishna
- Ashif Mulla
- Mahathi Vaishnavi Bhat

== Soundtrack ==
Guru Shishyaru

Soundtrack album by B. Ajaneesh Loknath
- Released: 2022
- Genre: Feature film soundtrack
- Length: 18:06
- Language: Kannada
- Label: Anand Audio
- Producer: B. Ajaneesh Loknath

B. Ajaneesh Loknath chronology
Vikrant Rona (2022)	Guru Shishyaru (2022)	Kantara (2022)

The film's songs and background score is composed by B. Ajaneesh Loknath

No.	Title	Lyrics	Singer(s)	Length
1.	"Aane Maadi Heluteeni"	Punith Arya	Harshika Devanath, Vijay Prakash	4:24
2.	"Gurugalu Namma Gurugalu"	V. Nagendra Prasad	Vijay Prakash	4:47
3.	"Nade Mundhe"	Chethan Kumar (director)	Kailash Kher	2:53
4.	"Baala Ollevru Nam Meshtru"	Yograj Bhat	V. Harikrishna	4:08
5.	"Baredoru Yaara Yenaa"	Sharanakumar Gajendragad	Prem (director)	1:54
Total length:				18:06

== Release ==
The film was released on 23 September 2022. The Film ran for over 50 days in few screens across Karnataka. The streaming rights of the movie was sold to Zee5 and premiered on 11 November 2022.

== Reception ==
The Movie opened to positive reviews from Audience and the critics as well who praised the story backdrop, artist performance and writing.

Sridevi S of The Times of India rated the movie 3 1/2 out of 5 and wrote "The film is a must-watch and gives a much-needed break from mindless action films with its honest and neat making". Y. Maheswara Reddy of Bangalore Mirror described the movie as "Sporty and Fun" and rated 3.5/5. Shivani Kava reviewing for The News Minute wrote "A wholesome sports drama with a hint of humour" Prathibha Joy of OTTPlay rated the movie 4/5 and in her review wrote "When you have a theatre full of young college boys discussing wanting to play kho kho as they walk out, rest assured, the film team’s objectives have been met – to present an entertaining tale that is meant to create awareness about a fast-fading sport. Sharan, Tharun and director Jadeshaa have presented a clean wholesome entertainer that should be a sure-shot winner". A. Sharadhaa of The New Indian Express described the movie as a "highly effective film that has a strong message for the students and it is sure to take the adults on a nostalgic trip to their school and college days. On the whole, Guru Shishyaru is a soulful tribute to the once-famous kho-kho."

Reviewing for Tv9 Kannada Rajesh Duggumane said the movie is "A light-hearted comedy with an exciting Kho-kho match" Avinash G Ram of Vijaya Karnataka wrote Exciting tournament of Guru Shishyaru; An entertaining Diwali for the audience. R Kesavamurthy of Asianet Kannada rated the movie 4/5 and wrote "'Guru Shishyaru' is an example of how a simple story can be filled with entertainment, realism, rustic charm, nativity beauty and inspiration and dreams."

== Awards and nominations ==
Award	Category	Recipient	Result	Ref.
11th South Indian International Movie Awards	Best Actor in Negative Role	Apurva Kasaravalli	Nominated	
Bengaluru International Film Festival
Bengaluru International Film Festival	Best Film	Jadesh Kumar Hampi	Nominated	
4th Chandavana Film Critics Academy Awards	Best Director	Jadesh Kumar Hampi	Nominated	
4th Chandavana Film Critics Academy Awards	Best Dialogues	Maasthi	Won	
4th Chandavana Film Critics Academy Awards	Best Supporting Actor	Dattanna	Nominated	
4th Chandavana Film Critics Academy Awards	Best Child Artist	Eknath Prem	Nominated	
4th Chandavana Film Critics Academy Awards	Best Child Artist	Hruday Sharan	Nominated	
4th Chandavana Film Critics Academy Awards	Best Editing	K.M. Prakash	Nominated	
