= 68th Filmfare Awards South =

2024 online film awards event

- Announced on: 11 July 2024
- Organized by: The Times Group
- Magazine issue: Filmfare
- Official website: Official website

Highlights
- Best Film: RRR (Telugu); Ponniyin Selvan: I (Tamil); Kantara (Kannada); Nna Thaan Case Kodu (Malayalam)
- Most awards: RRR (9)
- Most nominations: RRR and Sita Ramam (13)

The 68th Filmfare Awards South is an awards event that recognised and honoured the best films and performances from the Telugu, Tamil, Kannada and Malayalam films and music released in 2022 along with special honours for lifetime contributions and few special awards. Since the ceremony was not held in person in 2023, the nominations and winners were announced digitally on 11 July 2024.

== Winners and nominees ==
Winners are listed first, highlighted in boldface.

=== Main awards ===
==== Kannada cinema ====
Best Film	Best Director
**Kantara** **– Vijay Kiragandur, producer**; 777 Charlie – G. S. Gupta and Rakshit Shetty, producers; Dollu – Apeksha Purohit and Pavan Wadeyar, producers; KGF: Chapter 2 – Vijay Kiragandur, producer; Taledanda – Hema Malini Krupakar, producer; Vedha – Geeta Shivarajkumar, producer; Vikrant Rona – Jack Manjunath, producer	**Kiranraj K. – 777 Charlie**; A. Harsha – Vedha; Prashanth Neel – KGF: Chapter 2; Praveen Krupakar – Taledanda; Rishab Shetty – Kantara; Sagar Puranik – Dollu; Yogaraj Bhat – Gaalipata 2
Best Actor	Best Actress
**Rishab Shetty** **– Kantara as Shiva**; Dhananjaya – Monsoon Raaga as Katte; Rakshit Shetty – 777 Charlie as Dharmaraj Dattana; Shiva Rajkumar – Vedha as Vedha; Sudeepa – Vikrant Rona as Vikrant Rona; Yash – KGF: Chapter 2 as Rocky	**Chaithra J. Achar – Taledanda as Saaki**; Aishani Shetty – Dharani Mandala Madhyadolage as Shreya; Ganavi Laxman – Vedha as Pushpa; Meghana Gaonkar – Shubhamangala as Anu; Rachita Ram – Monsoon Raaga as Asma Begum; Sapthami Gowda – Kantara as Leela
Best Supporting Actor	Best Supporting Actress
**Achyuth Kumar – Kantara as Devendra Suttooru**; Anant Nag – Gaalipata 2 as Kishore / Meshtru; Kishore – Kantara as Murali; Nirup Bhandari – Vikrant Rona as Sanjeev Gambhira / Raghava; Prakash Raj – KGF: Chapter 2 as Vijayendra Ingalagi	**Mangala N – Taledanda as Kethamma**; Aditi Sagar – Vedha as Kanaka; Archana Jois – KGF: Chapter 2 as Shanthamma; Manasi Sudhir– Kantara as Kamala; Umashree – Vedha as Shankri
Best Music Director	Best Lyricist
**B. Ajaneesh Loknath – Kantara**; Arjun Janya – Vedha; J. Anoop Seelin – Monsoon Raaga; Nobin Paul – 777 Charlie; Ravi Basrur – KGF: Chapter 2	**V. Nagendra Prasad – "Belakina Kavithe" from Banaras**; Jayanth Kaikini – "Neenu Bagehariyada Haadu" from Gaalipata 2; K. Kalyan – "Megharajana Raaga" from Monsoon Raaga; Raghavendra Kamath – "Ninadene Januma" from Love Mocktail 2; Trilok Trivikrama – "Karma Song" from Kantara
Best Playback Singer – Male	Best Playback Singer – Female
**Sai Vignesh – "Varaha Roopam" from Kantara**; Haricharan – "Aa Kanasu" from Sakutumba Sametha; Sanjith Hegde – "Belakina Kavithe" from Banaras; Sid Sriram – "Jagave Neenu Gelathiye" from Love 360; Vijay Prakash – "Singara Siriye" from Kantara	**Sunidhi Chauhan – "Ra Ra Rakkamma" from Vikrant Rona**; Aarna Shetty – "Sahapaati" from 777 Charlie; Harshika Devanath – "Aane Maadi Heluteeni" from Guru Shishyaru; Indu Nagaraj – "Aralada Mallige" from Vedha; Siri Ravikumar – "Sangaathi" from Sakutumba Sametha
Critics Best Actor	Critics Best Actress
**Naveen Shankar – Dharani Mandala Madhyadolage as Aadi**	**Sapthami Gowda** **– Kantara as Leela**

==== Malayalam cinema ====
Best Film	Best Director
**Nna Thaan Case Kodu** **– Kunchacko Boban, Santhosh T. Kuruvilla and Sheril Rachel Santhosh, producers**; Ariyippu – Kunchako Boban, Mahesh Narayanan and Shebin Backer, producers; Hridayam – Visakh Subramaniam, producer; Jaya Jaya Jaya Jaya Hey – Ganesh Menon, Lakshmi Warrier, producers; Jo and Jo – Adarsh Narayan, Anumod Bose, Harris Desom and P. B. Anish, producers; Puzhu – S. George, producer; Saudi Vellakka – Sandip Senan, producer	**Ratheesh Balakrishnan Poduval – Nna Thaan Case Kodu**; Amal Neerad – Bheeshma Parvam; Khalid Rahman – Thallumaala; Mahesh Narayanan – Ariyippu; Rahul Sadasivan – Bhoothakaalam; Tharun Moorthy – Saudi Vellakka; Vipin Das – Jaya Jaya Jaya Jaya Hey
Best Actor	Best Actress
**Kunchacko Boban – Nna Thaan Case Kodu as Kozhummal Rajeevan**; Basil Joseph – Jaya Jaya Jaya Jaya Hey as Rajesh; Kunchako Boban – Ariyippu as Hareesh P. V.; Mammootty – Puzhu as Kuttan; Prithviraj Sukumaran – Jana Gana Mana as Aravind Swaminathan; Tovino Thomas – Thallumaala as Wazim; Vineeth Sreenivasan – Mukundan Unni Associates as Mukundan Unni	**Darshana Rajendran – Jaya Jaya Jaya Jaya Hey as Jayabharathi**; Aishwarya Lekshmi – Kumari as Kumari; Devi Varma – Saudi Vellakka as Ayisha Rowther; Navya Nair – Oruthee as C. K. Radhamani; Nithya Menen – 19(1)(a); Revathi – Bhoothakaalam as Asha
Best Supporting Actor	Best Supporting Actress
**Indrans – Udal as Kuttichayan**; Alencier Ley Lopez – Appan; P. P. Kunhikrishnan – Nna Thaan Case Kodu as Magistrate; Sharafudheen – Rorschach as Satheeshan Madathil; Shine Tom Chacko – Bheeshma Parvam as Anjootti Peter; Suraj Venjaramoodu – Jana Gana Mana as Sajjan Kumar	**Parvathy Thiruvothu – Puzhu as Bharathi**; Darshana Rajendran – Hridayam as Darshana; Grace Antony – Rorschach as Sujatha; Mamta Mohandas – Jana Gana Mana as Saba Mariyam; Radhika Radhakrishnan – Appan as Sheela; Sshivada – Meri Awas Suno as Meryl; Surabhi Lakshmi – Kumari as Muthamma
Best Music Director	Best Lyricist
**Kailas Menon – Vaashi**; A. R. Rahman – Malayankunju; M. Jayachandran – Meri Awas Suno; M. Jayachandran – Pathonpatham Noottandu; Rahul Raj – Aaraattu; Ranjin Raj – Malikappuram; Sumesh Parameswar – Signature	**Arun Alat – "Darshana" from Hridayam**; B. K. Harinarayanan – "Kaattathoru Mankoodu" from Meri Awas Suno; B. K. Harinarayanan – "Nangeli Poove" from Malikappuram; Nikesh Chembilode – "Thaaruzhiyum" from Aaraattu; Rafeeq Ahamed – "Mayilpeeli Ilakunnu" from Pathonpatham Noottandu; Santosh Varma – "Elelamma" from Signature; Vinayak Sasikumar – "Enthanithu Engottithu" from Jaya Jaya Jaya Jaya Hey
Best Playback Singer – Male	Best Playback Singer – Female
**Unni Menon – "Rathipushpam" from Bheeshma Parvam**; Ranjin Raj – "Nangeli Poove" from Malikappuram; Jithin Raj – "Kaattathoru Mankoodu" from Meri Awas Suno; Job Kurian – "Pakalo Kaanaathe" from Saudi Vellakka; K. S. Harisankar – "Thaaruzhiyum" from Aaraattu; Shahabaz Aman – "Aadalodakam" from Nna Thaan Case Kodu; Vijay Yesudas – "Cholappenne" from Malayankunju	**Mridula Warrier – "Mayilpeeli Ilakunnu" from Pathonpatham Noottandu**; Aavani Malhar – "Mandarappoove" from Kumari; Anne Amie – "Pranayamennoru Vakku" from Meri Awas Suno; Shweta Mohan – "Mannum Niranje" from Malayankunju; Sithara Krishnakumar – "Angane" from Jack N' Jill; Vrinda Menon – "Elelamma" from Signature
Critics Best Actor	Critics Best Actress
**Alencier Ley Lopez** **– Appan as Ittychan**	**Revathi – Bhoothakaalam as Asha**

==== Tamil cinema ====
Best Film	Best Director
**Ponniyin Selvan: I** **– Mani Ratnam and Subaskaran Allirajah, producers**; Gargi – Aishwarya Lekshmi, Gautham Ramachandran, Thomas George and Ravichandran Ramachandran, producers; Iravin Nizhal – Anshu Prabhakar, Bala Swaminathan, Caldwell Velnambi, Pinchi Srinivasan, Ranjith Dhandapani and R. Parthiban, producers; Kadaisi Vivasayi – M. Manikandan, producer; Rocketry: The Nambi Effect – R. Madhavan, Sarita Madhavan, Varghese Moolan and Vijay V. Moolan, producers; Vendhu Thanindhathu Kaadu – Ishari K. Ganesh, producer; Vikram – Kamal Haasan and R. Mahendran, producers	**Mani Ratnam – Ponniyin Selvan: I**; Gautham Ramachandran – Gargi; Gautham Vasudev Menon – Vendhu Thanindhathu Kaadu; Lokesh Kanagaraj – Vikram; M. Manikandan – Kadaisi Vivasayi; R. Madhavan – Rocketry: The Nambi Effect; Radhakrishnan Parthiban – Iravin Nizhal
Best Actor	Best Actress
**Kamal Haasan – Vikram as Agent Arun Kumar Vikram**; Dhanush – Thiruchitrambalam as Thiruchitrambalam Jr.; Karthi – Ponniyin Selvan: I as Vallavaraiyan Vandiyadevan; R. Madhavan – Rocketry: The Nambi Effect as Nambi Narayanan; Radhakrishnan Parthiban – Iravin Nizhal as Nandu; Silambarasan – Vendhu Thanindhathu Kaadu as Muthuveeran; Vikram – Ponniyin Selvan: I as Aditha Karikalan	**Sai Pallavi – Gargi as Gargi**; Aishwarya Lekshmi – Gatta Kusthi as Keerthi; Aishwarya Rai Bachchan – Ponniyin Selvan: I as Nandini; Keerthy Suresh – Saani Kaayidham as Ponni; Kovai Sarala – Sembi as Veerathayi; Nithya Menen – Thiruchitrambalam as Shobana; Trisha Krishnan – Ponniyin Selvan: I as Kundavai
Best Supporting Actor	Best Supporting Actress
**Kaali Venkat – Gargi as Indrans Kaliyaperumal**; Arav – Kalaga Thalaivan as Arjun; S. J. Suryah – Don as Bhoominathan; Selvaraghavan – Saani Kaayidham as Sangayya; Vijay Sethupathi – Vikram as Sandhanam; Yogi Babu – Love Today as Venu Shastri Iyengar	**Urvashi – Veetla Vishesham as Krishnaveni Unnikrishnan**; Aishwarya Lekshmi – Ponniyin Selvan: I as Poonguzhali; Radhika Sarathkumar – Love Today as Saraswathi; Raichal Rabecca – Kadaisi Vivasayi as Mangaiyarkarasi; Raiza Wilson – FIR as Anisha Qureshi; Simran – Rocketry: The Nambi Effect as Meena Narayanan
Best Music Director	Best Lyricist
**A. R. Rahman – Ponniyin Selvan: I**; Anirudh Ravichander – Beast; Anirudh Ravichander – Thiruchitrambalam; Anirudh Ravichander – Vikram; A. R. Rahman – Vendhu Thanindhathu Kaadu; Yuvan Shankar Raja – Love Today	**Thamarai – "Marakuma Nenjam" from Vendhu Thanindhathu Kaadu**; Dhanush – "Megham Karukkatha" from Thiruchitrambalam; Ilango Krishnan – "Devaralan Attam" from Ponniyin Selvan: I; Ilango Krishnan – "Ponni Nadhi" from Ponniyin Selvan: I; Madhan Karky – "Maayava Thooyava" from Iravin Nizhal; Vishnu Edavan – "Porkanda Singam" from Vikram
Best Playback Singer – Male	Best Playback Singer – Female
**Santhosh Narayanan – "Thenmozhi" from Thiruchitrambalam**; A. R. Rahman – "Marakuma Nenjam" from Vendhu Thanindhathu Kaadu; Dhanush – "Megham Karukkatha" from Thiruchitrambalam; Anirudh Ravichander and Kamal Haasan – "Pathala Pathala" from Vikram; Sid Sriram – "Mother Song" from Valimai	**Antara Nandy – "Alaikadal" from Ponniyin Selvan: I**; Chinmayi Sripaada – "Panithuli" from Raangi; Jonita Gandhi – "Arabic Kuthu" from Beast; Madhushree – "Mallipoo" from Vendhu Thanindhathu Kaadu; Shreya Ghoshal – "Maayava Thooyava" from Iravin Nizhal; Shreya Ghoshal – "Unna Nenachadhum" from Vendhu Thanindhathu Kaadu
Critics Best Actor	Critics Best Actress
**R. Madhavan** **– Rocketry: The Nambi Effect as Nambi Narayanan**; **Dhanush – Thiruchitrambalam as Thiruchitrambalam Jr.**	**Nithya Menen** **– Thiruchitrambalam as Shobana**

==== Telugu cinema ====
Best Film	Best Director
**RRR** **– D. V. V. Danayya, producer**; Bimbisara – Kosaraju Harikrishna, producer; DJ Tillu – Suryadevara Naga Vamsi, producer; Karthikeya 2 – Abhishek Agarwal and T. G. Viswa Prasad, producers; Major – Anurag Reddy, Mahesh Babu, Namrata Shirodkar and Sharath Chandra, producers; Sita Ramam – C. Aswani Dutt, producer	**S. S. Rajamouli – RRR**; Chandoo Mondeti – Karthikeya 2; Hanu Raghavapudi – Sita Ramam; Sai Kiran – Masooda; Sashi Kiran Tikka – Major; Vimal Krishna – DJ Tillu
Best Actor	Best Actress
**N. T. Rama Rao Jr. – RRR as Komaram Bheem**; **Ram Charan – RRR as Alluri Sitarama Raju**; Adivi Sesh – Major as Sandeep Unnikrishnan; Chiranjeevi – Godfather as Brahma Teja; Dulquer Salmaan – Sita Ramam as Ram; Pawan Kalyan – Bheemla Nayak as Sarhad Bheemla Nayak; Siddhu Jonnalagadda – DJ Tillu as Bala Gangadhar Tilak	**Mrunal Thakur – Sita Ramam as Princess Noor Jahan / Sita Mahalakshmi**; Aishwarya Lekshmi – Ammu as Amudha Ravindranath; Nazriya Nazim – Ante Sundaraniki as Leela Thomas; Neha Shetty – DJ Tillu as Radhika; Nithya Menen – Bheemla Nayak as Suguna; Sai Pallavi – Virata Parvam as Vennela; Samantha – Yashoda as Yashoda
Best Supporting Actor	Best Supporting Actress
**Rana Daggubati – Bheemla Nayak as Danny Shekhar**; Ajay Devgn – RRR as Alluri Venkatarama Raju; Muralidhar Goud – DJ Tillu; Naresh – Ante Sundaraniki as Kasthuri Suryanarayana Sastry; Satyadev – Godfather as Jaidev Das; Sumanth – Sita Ramam as Vishnu Sharma	**Nandita Das – Virata Parvam as Shakuntala**; Amala – Oke Oka Jeevitham; Priyamani – Virata Parvam as Bharathakka; Rashmika Mandanna – Sita Ramam as Afreen / Waheeda; Sangeetha – Masooda as Neelam; Sobhita Dhulipala – Major as Pramoda Reddy
Best Music Director	Best Lyricist
**M. M. Keeravani – RRR**; Bheems Ceciroleo – Dhamaka; Sricharan Pakala – DJ Tillu; Sricharan Pakala – Major; Thaman S – Bheemla Nayak; Vishal Chandrashekhar – Sita Ramam	**Sirivennela Seetharama Sastry** (Note: Awarded posthumously) **– "Kaanunna Kalyanam" from Sita Ramam**; Chandrabose – "Kolu Kolu" from Virata Parvam; Krishnakanth – "Inthandham" from Sita Ramam; Ramajogayya Sastry – "Entha Chithram" from Ante Sundaraniki; Sirivennela Seetharama Sastry – "Amma Song" from Oke Oka Jeevitham; Suddala Ashok Teja – "Komuram Bheemudo" from RRR
Best Playback Singer – Male	Best Playback Singer – Female
**Kaala Bhairava – "Komuram Bheemudo" from RRR**; Rahul Sipligunj and Kaala Bhairava – "Naatu Naatu" from RRR; Ram Miriyala – "Tillu Anna DJ Pedithe" from DJ Tillu; Sid Sriram – "Kalaavathi" from Sarkaru Vaari Paata; S. P. Charan – "Inthandham" from Sita Ramam	**Chinmayi Sripaada – "Oh Prema" from Sita Ramam**; Divya Malika – "Kolu Kolu" from Virata Parvam; Haripriya – "Ee Veduka" from Ashoka Vanamlo Arjuna Kalyanam; Jonita Gandhi – "Ento Enteynto" from Thank You; K. S. Chithra – "Antha Ishtam" from Bheemla Nayak; Prakruthi Reddy – "Komma Uyyala" from RRR
Critics Best Actor	Critics Best Actress
**Dulquer Salmaan** **– Sita Ramam as Ram**	**Sai Pallavi** **– Virata Parvam as Vennela**

=== Technical awards ===
Best Cinematographer
- **K. K. Senthil Kumar (Telugu) – RRR**
- **Ravi Varman (Tamil) – Ponniyin Selvan: I**
Best Choreography
- **Prem Rakshith** **(Telugu) – "Naatu Naatu" from RRR**
Best Production Design
- **Sabu Cyril (Telugu) – RRR**

=== Special awards ===
Critics Best Film (Director)
- **Sita Ramam** **(Telugu) – Hanu Raghavapudi**
- **Kadaisi Vivasayi** **(Tamil) – M. Manikandan**
- **Ariyippu (Malayalam) – Mahesh Narayanan**
- **Dharani Mandala Madhyadolage** **(Kannada) – Sridhar Shikaripura**
Best Male Debut
- **Pradeep Ranganathan** **(Tamil) – Love Today as Uthaman Pradeep**
Best Female Debut
- **Aditi Shankar** **(Tamil) – Viruman as Thenmozhi**

== Superlatives ==
Films with multiple nominations
Nominations	Film
13	RRR
13	Sita Ramam
12	Kantara
12	Ponniyin Selvan: I
7	DJ Tillu
7	Thiruchitrambalam
7	Vendhu Thanindhathu Kaadu
6	KGF: Chapter 2
6	Vikram
6	Vedha
5	777 Charlie
5	Bheemla Nayak
5	Iravin Nizhal
5	Jaya Jaya Jaya Jaya Hey
5	Major
5	Meri Awas Suno
5	Nna Thaan Case Kodu
5	Rocketry: The Nambi Effect
5	Virata Parvam
4	Ariyippu
4	Gargi
4	Kadaisi Vivasayi
4	Love Today
4	Monsoon Raaga
4	Saudi Vellakka
4	Taledanda
4	Vikrant Rona
3	Aaraattu
3	Ante Sundaraniki
3	Appan
3	Bheeshma Parvam
3	Bhoothakaalam
3	Dharani Mandala Madhyadolage
3	Gaalipata 2
3	Hridayam
3	Jana Gana Mana
3	Jo and Jo
3	Kumari
3	Malayankunju
3	Malikappuram
3	Pathonpatham Noottandu
3	Puzhu
3	Signature
2	Banaras
2	Beast
2	Dollu
2	Godfather
2	Karthikeya 2
2	Masooda
2	Rorschach
2	Saani Kaayidham
2	Sakutumba Sametha
2	Thallumaala
2	Oke Oka Jeevitham

Films with multiple awards (including non-competitive)
Awards	Film
9	RRR
6	Kantara
5	Ponniyin Selvan: I
5	Sita Ramam
3	Nna Thaan Case Kodu
3	Thiruchitrambalam
2	KGF: Chapter 2
2	Dharani Mandala Madhyadolage
2	Gargi
2	Taledanda
2	Virata Parvam
