= Filmfare Award for Best Male Playback Singer – Tamil =

Indian annual film award

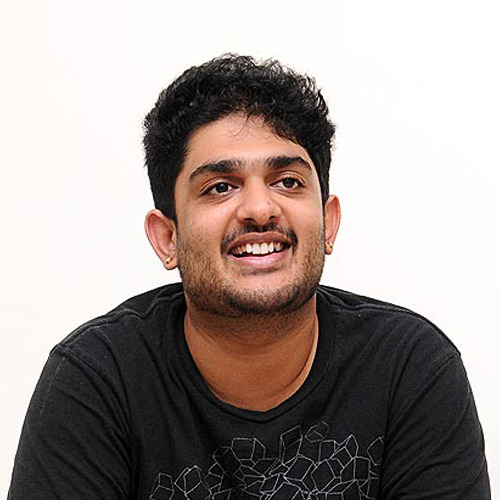
Sid Sriram was awarded twice, in 2015 and 2018

The Tamil Filmfare Best Male Playback Award is given by the Filmfare magazine for best playback singer as part of its annual Filmfare Awards for Tamil films. The award was first presented in 2005, with Karthik being the first recipient.

== Superlatives ==
Superlative	Singer	Record
Most wins	Karthik	3

== Winners ==
Here is a list of the award winners and the films for which they won.

Year	Singer	Film	Song
2024	Haricharan	Amaran	"Hey Minnale"
2023	Haricharan	Ponniyin Selvan: II	"Chinnanjiru Nilave"
2022	Santhosh Narayanan	Thiruchitrambalam	"Thenmozhi"
2020–2021	Christin Jos; Govind Vasantha	Soorarai Pottru	"Aagasam"
2019	AWARDS FUNCTION WAS SUSPENDED DUE TO COVID-19 PANDEMIC		
2018	Sid Sriram	Pyaar Prema Kaadhal	"Hey Penne"
2017	Anirudh Ravichander	Vikram Vedha	"Yaanji"
2016	Sundarayyar	Joker	"Jasmine U"
2015	Sid Sriram	I	"Ennodu Nee Irundhaal"
2014	Pradeep Kumar	Madras	"Aagayam Theepiditha"
2013	Sriram Parthasarathy	Thangameengal	"Aananda Yazhai"
2012	Dhanush	3	"Why This Kolaveri Di"
2011	Aalap Raju	Ko	"Ennamo Yedho"
2010	Karthik	Raavanan	"Usure Pogudhey"
2009	Karthik	Aadhavan	"Hasili Fisili"
2008	Naresh Iyer	Vaaranam Aayiram	"Munthinam Paarthiney"
2007	S. P. Balasubrahmanyam	Mozhi	"Kannal Pesum Penne"
2006	Ulaganathan	Chithiram Pesuthadi	"Vaazha Meenu"
2005	Karthik	Ghajini	"Oru Maalai"

== Nominations ==
=== 2000s ===
2008: Naresh Iyer for "Mundhinam Partheney" from Vaaranam Aayiram

- Belly Raj for "Kangal Irandal" from Subramaniapuram
- Hariharan for "Nenjukkul peidhidum" from Varanam Aayiram
- Karthik for "Oru Naalaikul" from Yaaradi Nee Mohini
- Krish for "Adiye Kolludhey" from Varanam Aayiram
- Vijay Antony for "Naaka Mukka" from Kadhalil Vizhunthen

2009: Karthik for "Hasile Fisile" from Aadhavan

- Harish Raghavendra for "Nenje Nenje" from Ayan
- Karthik for "Vizhi Moodi" from Ayan
- Krish for "Chinna Thamarai" from Vettaikaaran
- Naresh Iyer for "Oru Vetkam" from Pasanga
- Tippu for "Vaada Maapla" from Villu

=== 2010s ===
2010: Karthik for "Usure Poguthey" from Raavanan

- Dhanush for "Un Mele Aasathan" from Aayirathil Oruvan
- Rahul Nambiar for "Adadaa Mazhadaa" from Paiyaa
- Udit Narayan for "Vaama Duraiamma" from Madrasapattinam
- Vijay Prakash for "Hosanna" from Vinnaithaandi Varuvaaya
- Yuvan Shankar Raja for "Iragai Poley" from Naan Mahaan Alla

2011: Aalap Raju for "Enamo Aedho" from Ko

- G. V. Prakash Kumar for "Yathe Yathe" from Aadukalam
- Karthik for "Mun Andhi" from 7 Aum Arivu
- Richard for "Nangai" from Engeyum Kadhal
- S. P. Balasubrahmanyam for "Yamma Yamma" from 7 Aum Arivu

2012: Dhanush for "Why This Kolaveri" from 3

- D. Imman for "Onnum Puriyale" from Kumki
- G. V. Prakash Kumar for "Para Para" from Neerparavai
- Karthik for "Katrai Konjam" from Neethane En Ponvasantham
- Vijay Yesudas for "Nee Partha Vizigal" from 3

2013: A. R. Rahman for "Elay Keechan" from Kadal

- Abhay Jodhpurkar for "Moongil Thottam" from Kadal
- G. V. Prakash Kumar for "Yaar Indha Saalai Oram" from Thalaivaa
- Sriram Parthasarathy for "Anandha Yaazhai" from Thanga Meengal
- Yuvan Shankar Raja for "Kadal Rasa Naan" from Maryan

2014: Anirudh Ravichander for "Un Vizhigalil" from Maan Karate

- Haricharan for "Sandi Kuthirai" from Kaaviya Thalaivan
- Karthik for "Ovvondrai Thirudigarai" from Jeeva
- Pradeep Kumar for "Aagayam Theepidicha" from Madras
- Vijay for "Selfie Pulla" from Kaththi

2015: Sid Sriram – "Ennodu Nee Irundhaal" from I

- Anirudh Ravichander – "Thangamey" from Naanum Rowdy Dhaan
- A. R. Rahman – "Mental Manadhil" from OK Kanmani
- Dhanush – "Oh Ohh" from Thanga Magan
- Vijay – "Yeandi Yeandi" from Puli

2016: Sundarayyar – "Jasmine U" from Joker

- Anirudh Ravichander – "Senjittaley" from Remo
- Arunraja Kamaraj – "Neruppu Da" from Kabali
- Jithin Raj – "Yedho Mayam" from Wagah
- Sid Sriram – "Mei Nigara" from 24

2017: Anirudh Ravichander – "Yaanji" from Vikram Vedha

- A. R. Rahman – "Neethane" from Mersal
- Arjun Chandy & Haricharan – "Azhagiye" from Kaatru Veliyidai
- Sathyaprakash – "Nee Parkum" from Thiruttu Payale 2
- Sid Sriram – "Macho" from Mersal

2018: Sid Sriram for "Hey Penne" from Pyaar Prema Kaadhal

- Anirudh Ravichandran for "Kalyana Vayasu" from Kolamavu Kokila
- Anthony Daasan for "Sodakku" from Thaana Serndha Kootam
- Dhanush for "Rowdy Baby" from Maari 2
- Raghu Dixit, Sathyaprakash D, Jithin Raj for "Neeyum Naanum" from Imaikkaa Nodigal

=== 2020s ===
2020–2021 : Christin Jos and Govind Vasantha – "Aagasam" from Soorarai Pottru

- Arivu – "Vaathi Raid" from Master
- Bharath Sankar – "Mandela Tribute" from Mandela
- Kapil Kapilan – "Adiye" from Bachelor
- Sid Sriram – "Kadhaippoma" from Oh My Kadavule
- Vijay – "Kutti Story" from Master

2022 : Santhosh Narayanan – "Thenmozhi" from Thiruchitrambalam

- A. R. Rahman – "Marakuma Nenjam" from Vendhu Thanindhathu Kaadu
- Dhanush – "Megham Karukkatha" from Thiruchitrambalam
- Anirudh Ravichander and Kamal Haasan – "Pathala Pathala" from Vikram
- Sid Sriram – "Mother Song" from Valimai

2023 : Haricharan – "Chinnanjiru Nilave" from Ponniyin Selvan: II

- Anirudh Ravichander – "Hukum" from Jailer
- Anirudh Ravichander – "Badass" from Leo
- Sean Roldan – "Naan Gaali" from Good Night
- Sid Sriram and Gautham Vasudev Menon – "Nira" from Takkar
- Vijay Yesudas – "Nenjame Nenjame" from Maamannan

2024: Haricharan – "Hey Minnale" from Amaran

- Kapil Kapilan – "Vennilavu Saaral" from Amaran
- Pradeep Kumar – "Chillanjirukkiye" from Lubber Pandhu
- Sanjay Subrahmanyan – "Manasula" from Viduthalai 2
- Sid Sriram – "Thaaye Thaaye" from Maharaja
- Vijay Narain – "Poraen Naa Poraen" from Meiyazhagan
