= Cobra (soundtrack) =

2022 soundtrack album by A. R. Rahman

- Soundtrack album cover for Cobra

Soundtrack album by A. R. Rahman
- Released: 16 July 2022
- Recorded: 2019–2022
- Studio: Panchathan Record Inn and AM Studios, Chennai; Panchathan Hollywood Studios, Los Angeles; KM Music Conservatory, Chennai
- Genre: Feature film soundtrack
- Length: 21:15
- Language: Tamil
- Label: Sony Music India
- Producer: A. R. Rahman

A. R. Rahman chronology
Iravin Nizhal (2022)	Cobra (2022)	Ponniyin Selvan: I (2022)
External audio
- Official Audio Jukebox on YouTube

Singles from Cobra
- 1. "Thumbi Thullal" Released: 22 June 2020; 2. "Adheeraa" Released: 15 April 2022; 3. "Uyir Urugudhey" Released: 4 July 2022

Cobra is the soundtrack album composed by A. R. Rahman, to the 2022 Indian Tamil-language psychological action thriller film of the same name, directed by R. Ajay Gnanamuthu, starring Vikram, Srinidhi Shetty, Miya George, Mirnalini Ravi, Meenakshi Govindarajan, Irfan Pathan, Roshan Mathew and K.S. Ravikumar in lead roles. The film marks Rahman's fourth collaboration with Vikram after composing for Pudhiya Mannargal (1994), Raavanan (2010) and I (2015). The songs for the film featured lyrics written by Thamarai, Pa. Vijay, Vivek and Jithin Raj. The soundtrack was released at the audio launch held on 15 July 2022 at Phoenix Marketcity, Chennai.

== Production ==
The album is reported to have five tracks. Out of which, "Thumbi Thullal" was the first song composed by Rahman for this flick in mid-2019. Gnanamuthu mentioned he wanted the track to have celebratory tunes with lyrics that have "a deeper meaning and are emotional". Shreya Ghoshal provided female vocals and Nakul Abhyankar provided male vocals on track. Abhyankar only song the scratch portions of the track, until his version was finalised for the album. He worked on Cobra's soundtrack and sang chorus portions of the songs until the male charanam. As per him, the vocal harmony was recorded to sound like "gumbala paadara maadhihri irukkanum" (transl. It should sound like chorus singing). He further added the track "is a new age track with a tinge of classical Indian music and he [Rahman] is the master of doing such music, right from Roja (1992), where he was able to mash up and seamlessly blend two different genres".

Initially, the track was recorded with gibberish and hummings. The lyrics were penned later. For the Malayalam lyrics, playback singer Jithin Raj brainstormed with the team (Rahman, Vivek and Gnanamuthu) who briefed him to centralise lyrics on a festival theme. Later, he was called to record vocals in Malayalam. Raj said that, he had no idea on writing lyrics for the tracks, but, as he was a Malayali, he went with the overall theme of the song, that could fit with the film's music. The track spans around 4 minutes and half more; is spaced with orchestral strings, the score transcriptions were written by Shubham Bhat. The improvised nadaswaram notes written were based on composition by Sheik Chinna Moulana. Further, prominent instruments on the track are flute, sitar, thavil and continuum.

The original song was recorded by Vagu Mazan and rap verses by Thoughts for Now (Shiv). Abhyankar did choral arrangements for the track, alongside programming and mixing, and called that it was "so energetic", that he could imagine it as "a very powerful and thumping track", when being composed in the initial stages. Rahman also performed vocals for the track "Uyir Uruguthey". "Tharangini" was performed by Sarthak Kalyani, a contestant of Rahman's YouTube show ARRived, who described it as the "song of the year".

In August 2022, during his concert tour at the United States, Rahman began working on the mixing and re-recording of the film's score.

== Release ==
Cobra's soundtrack was led by three singles, with the first track from the film, "Thumbi Thullal" was released on 22 June 2020. Two years later, the second single "Adheeraa" was launched on 15 April 2022, followed by "Uyir Uruguthey" was released on 4 July. The audio launch was held at the Palladium Mall in Phoenix Marketcity, Chennai, on 15 July, featuring the cast and crew in attendance, and a live musical performance from Rahman and his team.

== Track listing ==
The official track list was released on 13 July 2022, a day before the album release. Despite the physical launch event, the soundtrack album was released to digital platforms a day later, on 16 July.

No.	Title	Lyrics	Singer(s)	Length
1.	"Thumbi Thullal"	Vivek, Jithin Raj	Shreya Ghoshal, Nakul Abhyankar	4:43
2.	"Adheeraa"	Pa. Vijay	Vagu Mazan, Thoughts for Now	4:19
3.	"Uyir Urugudhey"	Thamarai	A. R. Rahman, Sreekanth Hariharan	5:14
4.	"Tharangini"	Thamarai	Sarthak Kalyani	3:37
5.	"Yele Ilanchingamey"	Pa. Vijay	Rakshita Suresh	3:28
Total length:				21:15

== Reception ==
For the track "Thumbi Thullal", Humming Heart reviewed that "The song has a very busy arrangement of classical instruments throughout, complex structuring and a tune that is not often easy to follow amidst several sounds fighting for attention. But when Shreya Ghoshal lands the opening ‘Thumbi Thumbi’ note following a meandering tune and onomatopoeic sounds, the song materializes and how. The Indian Express stated "Thumbi Thullal is partially a Malayalam song like "Jiya Jale" from Dil Se ("Nenjinile" from Uyire) which has a catchy Malayalam chorus followed by Tamil lyrics." The News Minute also wrote about the track, saying "This song has plenty of AR Rahman tropes in it, especially in its chorus, and comes across as a perfect blend of the evolution of his composing styles, from the '90s to now. One can discern a whiff of his Bombay, Uyire, Varalaru and O Kadhal Kanmani albums mixed into this song."

Reviewing for the soundtrack, Moviecrow wrote "Rahman made the soundtrack worthwhile with a couple of melodies". Calling it as a "terrific soundtrack", critic Siddharth Srinivas gave 3.5/5 and wrote that the album "has many hit numbers in it and is sure to fly higher with the visuals. The songs do not have much of noise in them, and still score superbly thanks to the variety that they come in. Rahman has interestingly delivered a solid soundtrack in his first combination with Ajay Gnanamuthu."
