= Vendhu Thanindhathu Kaadu (soundtrack) =

2022 film soundtrack

Soundtrack album by A. R. Rahman
- Released: 31 August 2022
- Recorded: 2021–2022
- Studio: Panchathan Record Inn and AM Studios, Chennai
- Genre: Feature film soundtrack
- Length: 18:37
- Language: Tamil
- Label: Think Music
- Producer: A. R. Rahman

A. R. Rahman chronology
Cobra (2022)	Vendhu Thanindhathu Kaadu (2022)	Ponniyin Selvan: I (2022)

Singles from Vendhu Thanindhathu Kaadu
- 1. "Kaalathukkum Nee Venum" Released: 6 May 2022; 2. "Marakkuma Nenjam" Released: 15 August 2022

Vendhu Thanindhathu Kaadu is the soundtrack to the eponymous 2022 Tamil-language neo-noir gangster film directed by Gautham Vasudev Menon and starring Silambarasan in the lead role. The film's soundtrack features five songs composed by A. R. Rahman and lyrics written by Thamarai. It is preceded by two singles—"Kaalathukkum Nee Venum" and "Marakkuma Nenjam"—before the album's release on 31 August 2022 through Think Music. The album, particularly the song "Mallipoo", received positive response from music critics.

== Development ==
Vendhu Thanindhathu Kaadu marked Rahman's third collaboration with Menon after Vinnaithaandi Varuvaayaa (2010) and Achcham Yenbadhu Madamaiyada (2016); fourth with Silambarasan after the former two films and Chekka Chivantha Vaanam (2018). As with Menon's previous films, Thamarai penned the lyrics for all the songs in the film. Rahman had initially worked on three songs for Nadhigalil Neeradum Sooriyan, a film that was intended before the production of Vendhu Thanindhathu Kaadu. Menon, then requested Rahman to use the same tunes with different lyrics but Rahman composed fresh tunes for the film. Producer Ishari K. Ganesh after meeting Rahman multiple times in his studio, described that the songs "have come out very well".

The track "Mallipoo"—which received huge popularity post the film's release—was shot in a single sequence, which is about the gangsters dancing in a single room connecting with the world. Menon said "When you listened to the song, you might have thought that it was a number with women. But we didn’t want to do that at all. It is about the guys and their connection with the rest of the world through a phone." Rahman suggested the song "Mallipoo" regarding that particular sequence and composed it entirely which he sent to Menon, and he liked it.

Madhushree recorded vocals for the song; her first since three years. She revealed that, she had received numerous offers for singing in Tamil films during the COVID-19 pandemic but turned down them as she was skeptic on travelling to Chennai for recording. She accepted her part for "Mallipoo" due to her long-standing collaboration with Rahman. Besides acting in a prominent role, Neeraj Madhav wrote and performed a rap number "Porattam" for this film.

== Release ==
The audio rights were purchased by Think Music. The first single titled "Kaalathukkum Nee Venum" was released on 6 May 2022. The song was performed by Silambarasan and Rakshita Suresh; it was the second time Silambarasan had sung for Rahman, after "Bailamore" from Kadhal Virus (2002). The second single "Marakkuma Nenjam" sung by Rahman, which was featured in the film's teaser, was released on 15 August 2022. The film's music was launched on 31 August 2022 at the Vels Institute of Science, Technology & Advanced Studies in Chennai, with the cast and crew in attendance. Kamal Haasan and Udhayanidhi Stalin preceded the event as chief guests. The event's broadcast rights were acquired by Star Vijay and was premiered on 11 September 2022.

== Track listing ==
All tracks are written by Thamarai.

Original tracklist
No.	Title	Singer(s)	Length
1.	"Marakuma Nenjam"	A. R. Rahman	4:19
2.	"Mallipoo"	Madhushree	4:05
3.	"Muthu's Journey"	A. R. Rahman	1:22
4.	"Unna Nenachadhum"	Shreya Ghoshal, Sarthak Kalyani	3:56
5.	"Kaalathukkum Nee Venum"	Silambarasan, Rakshita Suresh	4:54
Total length:			18:37

Bonus track
No.	Title	Lyrics	Singer(s)	Length
6.	"Porattam"	Neeraj Madhav	Neeraj Madhav	2:03
Total length:				20:44

== Original score ==
Vendhu Thanindhathu Kaadu (Original Score)

Soundtrack album by A.R. Rahman
- Released: 12 February 2023
- Recorded: 2021–2022
- Studio: Panchathan Record Inn and AM Studios, Chennai
- Genre: Feature film soundtrack
- Length: 19:42
- Language: Tamil
- Label: Think Music
- Producer: A.R. Rahman

The film's background score featuring 19 tracks was released by Think Music on 12 February 2023.

No.	Title	Length
1.	"Muthu's Past"	2:10
2.	"The Forbidden Iron"	1:02
3.	"Parotta Shop"	1:58
4.	"Muthu In Love"	1:00
5.	"Idho Arambam"	1:00
6.	"Innocence Lost"	0:46
7.	"The Wild Ferris Wheel"	0:56
8.	"Muthu Forgives"	1:13
9.	"Something Fishy"	1:17
10.	"Stand By Me"	2:00
11.	"I'm Older Than You"	3:00
12.	"Rawther's Theme"	1:15
13.	"Muthu 2.0"	1:59
Total length:		19:42

== Reception ==
Vipin Nair of Music Aloud said that the album has "a great set of songs, occasionally let down by the vocal choices" and rated three-and-a-half out of five. Ramesh S. Kannan of Moviecrow described it as "a short but wholesome soundtrack" where "each melody shines on its own and is refreshing to listen". Soundarya Athimuthu of The Quint wrote "[Rahman] simply elevates the film with his scintillating music and background score that gives you frissons at periodic intervals". Janani K. of India Today wrote "AR Rahman’s haunting music and brilliant background score elevate Vendhu Thanindhadhu Kaadu’s mood drastically". Kirubakar Purushothaman of The Indian Express called Rahman's score being "restrained" which "lets the silence and dialogue do the job at many places". Sowmya Rajendran of The News Minute praised the placement of "Marakkuma Nenjam" that was used both "song and refrain".

== Accolades ==
Award (Note: Awards, festivals and organizations are in alphabetical order.)	Date of ceremony (Note: Date is linked to the article about the awards held that year, wherever possible.)	Category	Recipient(s) and nominee(s)	Result	Ref.
Ananda Vikatan Cinema Awards	30 March 2023	Best Music Director	A. R. Rahman (Note: A. R. Rahman won the award for three films – Ponniyin Selvan: I, Vendhu Thanindhathu Kaadu and Cobra)	Won	
Ananda Vikatan Cinema Awards	30 March 2023	Best Lyricist	Thamarai for "Marakkuma Nenjam" and "Mallipoo"	Nominated	
Ananda Vikatan Cinema Awards	30 March 2023	Best Playback Singer – Male	A. R. Rahman for "Marakkuma Nenjam"	Won	
Ananda Vikatan Cinema Awards	30 March 2023	Best Playback Singer – Female	Madhushree for "Mallipoo"	Won	
Ananda Vikatan Cinema Awards	30 March 2023	Best Choreographer	Brinda for "Mallipoo"	Nominated	
Norway Tamil Film Festival Awards	14 February 2023	Best Playback Singer – Female	Madhushree for "Mallipoo"	Won	
South Indian International Movie Awards	15–16 September 2023	Best Lyricist – Tamil	Thamarai for "Marakkuma Nenjam"	Nominated	
South Indian International Movie Awards	15–16 September 2023	Best Male Playback Singer – Tamil	A. R. Rahman for "Marakkuma Nenjam"	Nominated	
South Indian International Movie Awards	15–16 September 2023	Best Female Playback Singer – Tamil	Madhushree for "Mallipoo"	Won	
