= Bamba Bakya =

Indian playback singer and musician (1972–2022)

- Portrait of Bakya

Background information
- Born: Bhakkiyaraj; 31 October 1972
- Died: 2 September 2022 (aged 49) Chennai, Tamil Nadu, India
- Occupations: Playback singer; musician
- Years active: 2010–2022
- Spouse: Sivagami

Bhakkiyaraj (31 October 1972 – 2 September 2022), popularly known by his stage name, Bamba Bakya, was an Indian Tamil playback singer and musician. He predominantly worked alongside music composer A. R. Rahman on numerous collaborations in films. He received the name Bamba Bakya after A. R. Rahman asked him to sing songs for him just like African musician Sory Bamba. It later went onto become a stage name as well as an identity of him. He was well known for his unique baritone.

A. R. Rahman included him in the 2010 film Raavanan, during which he sang in the song "Kedakkari" (at the time he was credited as Bhakyaraj).

In 2024 A. R. Rahman revealed that with the help of AI, voice models of late singers Bamba Bakya and Shahul Hameed had been used in composing the track 'Thimiri Yezhuda' for the upcoming film Lal Salaam.

== Career ==
Bakya made his debut as a lead playback singer in S. Shankar's directorial 2.0 and sang his first single titled "Pullinangal" which became an instant hit and became a chartbuster. Prior to his entry into film industry, he mostly sang devotional songs. Prior to his untimely demise, he also rendered his voice for Mani Ratnam's historical drama film Ponniyin Selvan: I.

== Death ==
Bakya died on 2 September 2022, at age 49 due to cardiac arrest. He had been admitted to a hospital at Chennai after he complained of having a severe chest pain.

== Discography ==
Year	Song title	Film name	Language	Music director
2010	"Keda Kari"	Raavanan	Tamil	A. R. Rahman
2010	"Gudaa Gudaa"	Villain (D)	Tamil	A. R. Rahman
2018	"Pullinangal"	2.0	Tamil	A. R. Rahman
2018	"Simtaangaran"	Sarkar	Tamil	A. R. Rahman
2018	"Rapta Maara"	Sarkar (D)	Telugu	A. R. Rahman
2018	"Dingu Dongu"	Sarvam Thaala Mayam	Tamil	A. R. Rahman
2018	"Raati"	Raati (Independent -- 7UPMadrasGig)	Tamil	Santhosh Dhayanidhi
2018	"Ey Dummy Pattaasu"	Silukkuvarupatti Singam	Tamil	Leon James
2019	"Kaalame"	Bigil	Tamil	A. R. Rahman
2019	"Kondattam"	Raatchasi	Tamil	Sean Roldan
2019	"Maula Maula"	Action	Tamil	Hiphop Thamizha
2020	"Or Inam"	Or Inam (Independent)	Tamil	John A. Alexis
2020	"Kanmani Anbodu"	Time Up	Tamil	L. G. Bala
2021	"Middle Class"	Sivakumarin Sabadham	Tamil	Hiphop Thamizha
2021	"Kaasu"	Raame Aandalum Raavane Aandalum	Tamil	Krish
2022	"Kalangathey"	Anbarivu	Tamil	Hiphop Thamizha
2022	"Bejara"	Iravin Nizhal	Tamil	A.R. Rahman
2022	"Ponni Nadhi"	Ponniyin Selvan: I	Tamil	A.R. Rahman
2022	"Ponge Nadhi" (D)	Ponniyin Selvan: I	Telugu	A.R. Rahman
2024	"Thimiri Yezhuda" (AI Generated Voice)	Lal Salaam	Tamil	A.R. Rahman
