= Sindhooram (2023 film) =

- Release poster
- Directed by: Shyam Tummalapalli
- Produced by: Praveen Reddy Janga
- Starring: Brigida Saga; Dharma; Siva Balaji
- Cinematography: Kesav
- Edited by: Jesvin Prabu
- Music by: Gowra Hari
- Production company: Sri Lakshmi Narasimha Movie Makers
- Release date: 26 January 2023
- Country: India
- Language: Telugu

Sindhooram (transl. Vermilion) is a 2023 Indian Telugu-language social drama film directed by Shyam Tummalapalli and starring Brigida Saga (in her lead and Telugu debut), Dharma, and Siva Balaji.

== Cast ==
- Dharma as Ravi
- Siva Balaji as Singanna
- Brigida Saga as Sirisha Reddy
- Ravi Varma Adduri as Easwar Reddy, Sirisha's brother
- Dayanand Reddy as SI Palaniyappan
- Keshav Deepak as businessman
- Chakrapani Ananda as Narasimhulu

== Soundtrack ==
The music is composed by Gowra Hari.

Track listing
No.	Title	Lyrics	Singer(s)	Length
1.	"Anandamo Avesamo"	Balaji	Abhay Jodhpurkar	5:29
2.	"Sindhooram Title Song"	Suddala Ashok Teja	Saisharan	4:00
3.	"Ohh Madhiriga Saagey"	Balaji	Satya Prakash, Harini Ivaturi	2:40
4.	"Kaalaaley"	Gowra Hari	Gowra Hari	3:17

== Reception ==
A critic from The Times of India wrote that "Director Shyam Tummalapalli, with Sindhooram, takes a bold stance in showing the mirror to communism while telling this story inspired by true events. Impressive performances by the cast combined with strong content might make the audience look past the lacuna". A critic from NTV felt that the film was twenty years late. A critic from OTTplay wrote that "If you find your way past a middling, dull first hour, Sindhooram is a not-so-bad (anti) naxal drama with a few interesting twists".

== Home media ==
The film was streaming on Amazon Prime Video as of 21 April 2023.
