= Brigida Saga =

Indian actress

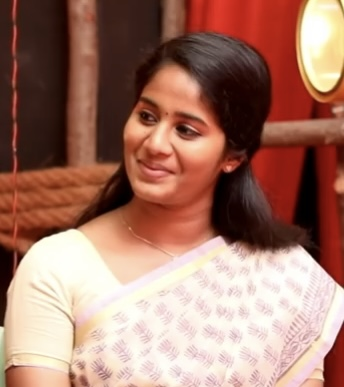
- Brigida in 2025
- Born: Sagaya Brigida; 14 January 2000 (age 26); Chennai
- Other name: Pavi Teacher
- Occupation: Actress
- Years active: 2019–present
- Partner: Ananth Ram (2026–present)

Brigida Saga (born 14 January 2000) is an Indian actress, predominantly appearing in Tamil films. She is known for her role in films such as Velan (2021), Iravin Nizhal (2022), and Garudan (2024).

== Career ==
Saga is known for her role as Pavi Teacher in the streaming series Aaha Kalyanam. She also acted in the films Ayogya, Master, Velan, Iravin Nizhal.

Saga played the lead role in the Telugu film Sindhooram (2023), for which she received a positive review.

== Filmography ==
- Note: all films are in Tamil, unless otherwise noted.

Key
†	Denotes films that have not yet been released

Year	Film	Role	Notes	Ref.
2019	Ayogya	Kader's daughter		
2020	Varmaa	Anu	Uncredited	
2021	Master	JD's student		
2021	Velan	Pavithra		
2022	Iravin Nizhal	Chilakamma		
2023	Sindhooram	Sirisha Reddy	Telugu films	
2023	Peddha Kapu 1	Lakshmi	Telugu films	
2024	Garudan	Parveen		
2024	Kozhipannai Chelladurai	Senthamaraiselvi "Thamarai"		
2025	Maargan	Inspector Sruthi Selvaraj		
2025	Idli Kadai	Young Kasturi		
2026	Hot Spot 2 Much	Madhumitha	Anthology film Segment - The Narration	
2026	Lakshmikanthan Kolai Vazhakku	Mallika		
2026	G.D.N	Deivanai		

=== Television series ===
Year	Title	Role	Channel
2019	Aaha Kalyanam	Pavi Teacher	Blacksheep TV
