= Ponniyin Selvan: I (soundtrack) =

2022 soundtrack album by A. R. Rahman

- Album cover

Soundtrack album by A. R. Rahman
- Released: 19 September 2022
- Recorded: 2019–2022
- Studios: Panchathan Record Inn and AM Studios, Chennai; KM Music Conservatory, Chennai; Panchathan Hollywood Studios, Los Angeles; Firdaus Studio, Dubai
- Genre: Feature film soundtrack
- Length: 25:25
- Language: Tamil
- Label: Tips Music
- Producer: A. R. Rahman

A. R. Rahman chronology
Vendhu Thanindhathu Kaadu (2022)	Ponniyin Selvan: I (2022)	Pathu Thala (2022)

Singles from Ponniyin Selvan: I
- 1. "Ponni Nadhi" Released: 31 July 2022; 2. "Chola Chola" Released: 19 August 2022

Ponniyin Selvan: I is the soundtrack album for 2022 Indian Tamil-language epic period drama film of the same name directed by Mani Ratnam which features an ensemble cast of Vikram, Karthi, Jayam Ravi, Aishwarya Rai Bachchan, Trisha, Aishwarya Lekshmi, Sobhita Dhulipala, Prabhu, R. Sarathkumar, Vikram Prabhu, Jayaram, Prakash Raj, Rahman and R. Parthiban. The film's soundtrack and score were composed by Ratnam's norm composer A. R. Rahman, marking the duo's 30th year collaborating.

For the film, Rahman researched extensively for the period setting and soundscape, taking nearly six months for initial works on the music. The soundtrack was curated and conceptualised for nearly three years, since mid-2019 to early-2022, where all the songs were recorded at the Panchathan Record Inn and AM Studios in Chennai, and also recorded at the Firdaus Studio in Dubai, inaugurated by Rahman, during Expo 2020. The soundtrack is the first of the two-part series composed for the duology, which has six songs for each film. It also marked Rahman's first soundtrack for a Mani Ratnam film not to feature lyrics written by Vairamuthu. Instead the soundtrack for the Tamil version, featured lyrics written by Ilango Krishnan, Kabilan, Siva Ananth and Krithika Nelson, while Mehboob Kotwal, Ananta Sriram, Rafeeq Ahamed and Jayanth Kaikini are credited as the songwriters for the Hindi, Telugu, Malayalam and Kannada versions, respectively.

Ponniyin Selvan: I's soundtrack, released by Tips Music, featured two singles. The first song titled "Ponni Nadhi" was released by Tips Music on 31 July 2022, and the second song "Chola Chola" was released on 19 August. The music launch event was held on 6 September, at Jawaharlal Nehru Indoor Stadium in Chennai, with the presence of the cast and crew and other celebrities. The album was officially released to music streaming platforms on the following day, 7 September, along with the Hindi, Telugu, Malayalam and Kannada versions. The music received positive response from critics appreciating Rahman's composition and the lyrics, while also praising the instrumentation in tune to the periodic setting and soundscape.

== Background ==
The soundtrack featured music composed by Ratnam's norm collaborator, A. R. Rahman. He called Ponniyin Selvan as one of the most difficult projects, since it is an epic film, and required an exhaustive research. It took him six months to work on the project, and he and Mani Ratnam also went to Bali and Cambodia for writing some of the songs, However, Rahman had stated the challenging part on scoring the film is that, Ratnam wanted a particular sound, "which is unique but at the same time relatable", adding that he worked hard to get that sound. Rahman researched on periodic instruments for the songs in tune to the film's setting in Chola period. During their music session in Bali and Cambodia, he incorporated those instruments from the region and used it in the soundtrack. In a September 2019 interaction with the press, Ratnam revealed that the film will have 12 songs (featuring in two-parts).

In December 2019, singer Harini confirmed in an interview that she has rendered her voice for one of the songs in the film. Shreya Ghoshal further recorded one song for the film. Apart from composition, Rahman also sang the track "Ponni Nadhi" for the film. In a January 2021 interview to Naman Ramachandran of Variety, Rahman said that the entire composition was completed during the COVID-19 lockdown in India. In December, Rahman shared a glimpse from the recording session of the film's songs, through social media platforms. The recording of the songs were completed by early-January 2022, and had submitted the final versions to Ratnam, who was impressed with the songs.

In March 2022, Rahman composed the film score at the newly constructed Firdaus Studio in Dubai, where he was performing at the Expo 2020, and invited Ratnam to supervise the scoring in person. The following month, vocal sessions for the film score began at the Panchathan Record Inn studio in Chennai. Percussionist Sivamani confirmed his involvement on scoring the film in late-June, and shared few behind-the-scenes of the recording through Instagram.

Singer and social media influencer Antara Nandy, a contestant in Rahman's YouTube show ARRived, made her feature film debut as a playback singer through this film. She earlier recorded a scratch version of the song "Alaikadal" within 45 minutes and mailed Ratnam for rectifying the song, though no response being received. Later, she was informed that her recording was approved and later was asked to sing the track in Hindi, Telugu and Kannada languages. The recording was finished within a week prior to the film's music launch. Speaking to The Times of India, Nandy said: "... [Mani] Sir told me one line brief, “I want it to sound like the waves of ocean, it should have ups and downs. It has to flow”. Then Mani sir also explained the scene to me, that, it is a song sung by a strong boatwoman, singing to her love of the life who she's longing to meet. It has to portray love, a flowy song. Though I knew the lyrics, I didn't know what each word meant, so I was worried. Rahman sir completely guided me, going line by line. That's how we recorded the song. After he started guiding, it became so easy."

== Music and lyrics ==
Ilango Krishnan, Kabilan, Siva Ananth and Krithika Nelson reported to write the songs for the Ponniyin Selvan: I soundtrack. For the dubbed versions, Mehboob Kotwal, Ananta Sriram, Rafeeq Ahamed and Jayanth Kaikini wrote the song lyrics in Hindi, Telugu, Malayalam and Kannada languages. Initially, Vairamuthu was reported to write all of the songs for the film, continuing the three-decade long collaboration with Ratnam and Rahman. His involvement received criticism from the female peers in the industry, particularly that of singer Chinmayi, who accused him on the grounds of sexual misconduct, led him to be excluded from the project in mid-December 2019. Rahman did not comment about Vairamuthu's exit, as the officials of Madras Talkies made the decision, while also adding that two of the songs were written by Kabilan. Several lyricists were reported to be part of the film, including Venba Geethaiyan, who was about to contribute to the songs, but was not officially roped in. In August 2021, the production executives officially revealed that poet Ilango Krishnan, will write lyrics for the film's songs. He was reported to contribute for eight songs in the two-part franchise.

"For this song, he told me that it had captured Vanthiyathevan's thoughts as he was riding to the Chola capital to deliver messages to the king and his daughter Kundhavai, who was the sister of his friend and leader Aaditha Karikalan. Vanthiyathevan is a warrior, who is goodhearted, intelligent, mingles with everyone, somewhat attracted towards women and has great affection towards Karikalan. He is his trustworthy friend, aide, and also commander. He has longing to see Thanjavur and the Ponni river for many years, but has been stuck up with the battles Karikalan was fighting in the north. Now, he finally has gotten his wish, but then he was going to travel as a spy. His thoughts turn to the Ponni river, which to him feels like heaven, but duty calls. The song had to capture this mental state of Vanthiyathevan."

— Ilango Krishnan, describing the song "Ponni Nadhi"

Krishnan revealed that, the film's dialogue writer B. Jeyamohan contacted him through text, about his inclusion, and he formally met Ratnam and Rahman in February 2020, who collected some of the works related to Ponniyin Selvan. For the songwriting process, he read several novels about the works of Cholas' history from prominent Indian historians-authors, K. A. Nilakanta Sastri, T. V. Sadasiva Pandarathar, Kudavayil Balasubramanian amongst several others, to ensure no historical inaccuracies. He also re-read classical poems, such as Akanaṉūṟu, Puranaanuru, Kuṟuntokai and Kamba Ramayanam, to refer those aesthetics of Classical and Sangam Tamil poetry, and incorporated modernised Tamil to "bring to life the imagery of the Chola period".

The song "Ponni Nadhi" was written within a month, while other songs in the album were written within two hours. It was the fourth song at the time, Krishnan had submitted it, who was not aware on being the introductory song for Vandiyadevan. While writing the track, he used the classical Tamil verses for few of the lines, including the first line from the song describes on "how Kallanai is an attire for Cauvery river that was built by Karikala Cholan 2,000 years ago". Krishnan revealed that, the significance of the track, is that, it is one of the few songs in Tamil, in the past few years, that did not borrow words from other languages. But, he predominantly "stuck to words with common usages".

== Marketing and release ==
In July 2022, the producers announced that Tips Industries have acquired the film's music rights for five languages at a sum of ₹25 crore (US$2.7 million). The first single from the film, "Ponni Nadhi" was released on 31 July 2022. The song was released in five different languages—in Hindi as "Kaveri Se Milne", in Telugu as "Ponge Nadhi" and in Malayalam and Kannada under the same title. A. R. Rahman sung the vocals for the track in Tamil, Telugu and Hindi versions, whereas Alphons Joseph and Nakul Abhyankar sung the Malayalam and Kannada versions.

The single was launched in an event held at Express Avenue mall in Royapettah, Chennai, with Jayam Ravi, Karthi and Jayaram in attendance. Sports personalities, P. V. Sindhu, Sanju Samson and Ravichandran Ashwin released the Tamil, Telugu and Malayalam versions. The same day, A. R. Rahman performed the song live in his concert at Houston, Texas. The making video of the song, was released on 3 August 2022, coinciding Aadi Perukku. Actor Karthi, who plays Vandiyadevan, said the song is an introduction to his personality, and an introduction to the Chola kingdom. He further described that the song "covers Vanthiyathevan's entire journey across the kingdom, as he rides his horse along the banks of the Kaveri River (known in ancient times as Ponni river)". On 19 August, the second single "Chola Chola" was released in five languages under the same title. The song was described as "an ode to Aditya Karikala's victory and valour", and the "glory and power of Cholas".

The film's music launch event was held on 6 September 2022 at the Jawaharlal Nehru Indoor Stadium, Chennai. The event saw the attendance of the film's cast and crew, and graced by Rajinikanth and Kamal Haasan as the chief guests. It was preceded by a live performance featuring Rahman's musical ensemble, who performed the film's songs and also other chartbusters from films such as Roja (1992), Bombay (1995), Alai Payuthey (2000), Guru (2007) and several other films, as a tribute to 30 years of Rahman's debut in the film music industry and his collaboration with Ratnam. The event was not streamed live, but was later telecasted on Sun TV on 25 September.

== Track listing ==
The album was digitally released on streaming media platforms on 7 September (a day after the audio launch). It was also released in Hindi, Telugu, Malayalam and Kannada, the same day.

Tamil
No.	Title	Lyrics	Singer(s)	Length
1.	"Ponni Nadhi"	Kabilan	A. R. Rahman, A. R. Raihanah, Bamba Bakya	4:51
2.	"Chola Chola"	Siva Ananth	Sathya Prakash, V. M. Mahalingam, Nakul Abhyankar	3:40
3.	"Ratchasa Maamaney"	Kabilan	Shreya Ghoshal, Palakkad Sreeram, Mahesh Vinayakram	4:50
4.	"Alaikadal"	Siva Ananth	Antara Nandy	5:14
5.	"Devaralan Attam"	Ilango Krishnan	Yogi Sekar	4:33
6.	"Sol"	Ilango Krishnan, Krithika Nelson	Rakshita Suresh, Krithika Nelson	2:14
Total length:				25:25

=== BGM Songs ===
All lyrics are written by Ilango Krishnan.

Tamil
No.	Title	Singer(s)	Length
1.	"Saaya Sanjale"	Nakul Abhyankar	NA
2.	"Chola Anthem"	Pavithra Chari, Vrusha Balu, Padmaja Sreenivasan, Aravind Srinivas, Sridhar Sena, Manoj Krishna	NA
3.	"Kodi Kodi (Reprise)"	A. R. Rahman	NA
4.	"Ilayanenjil"	Haricharan, Aravind Srinivas, Sathya Prakash	NA
5.	"Thoo Venvanmathi"	Sivasri Skandaprasad	NA
6.	"Climax Lament"	Sunitha Sarathy	NA
7.	"Aga naga"	Shakthisree Gopalan	NA
8.	"Nandhini Theme"	Nabyla Maan	NA
Total length:			NA

All lyrics are written by Mehboob.

Hindi
No.	Title	Singer(s)	Length
1.	"Kaveri Se Milne"	A. R. Rahman, Swagat Rathod, Pooja Tiwari	4:51
2.	"Chola Chola"	Vishal Mishra, Swagat Rathod	3:40
3.	"Rakshas Mama Re"	Shreya Ghoshal, Shaan, Mahesh Vinayakram	4:50
4.	"Doobi Doobi"	Antara Nandy	5:14
5.	"Devaralan Naach"	Sudeep Jaipurwale	4:33
6.	"Bol"	Shreya Ghoshal	2:14
Total length:			25:25

All lyrics are written by Anantha Sriram.

Telugu
No.	Title	Singer(s)	Length
1.	"Ponge Nadhi"	A. R. Rahman, A. R. Raihanah, Bamba Bakya	4:51
2.	"Chola Chola"	Mano, Anurag Kulkarni	3:40
3.	"Raachasa Maavaya"	Shreya Ghoshal, Shankar Mahadevan, Mahesh Vinayakram	4:50
4.	"Alanai Neekai"	Antara Nandy	5:14
5.	"Devaralan Aatta"	Sarath Santhosh	4:32
6.	"Sye"	Sireesha Bhagavatula	2:14
Total length:			25:25

All lyrics are written by Rafeeq Ahamed.

Malayalam
No.	Title	Singer(s)	Length
1.	"Ponni Nadhi"	Alphons Joseph, A. R. Raihanah, Jithin Raj	4:51
2.	"Chola Chola"	Benny Dayal, Jithin Raj	3:40
3.	"Rakshasa Maamane"	Shreya Ghoshal, Palakkad Sreeram, Mahesh Vinayakram	4:50
4.	"Alakadal"	Shweta Mohan	5:14
5.	"Devaralan Aattam"	Sreekanth Hariharan	4:32
6.	"Chol"	Sanah Moidutty	2:15
Total length:			25:25

All tracks are written by Jayanth Kaikini.

Kannada
No.	Title	Singer(s)	Length
1.	"Ponni Nadhi"	Nakul Abhyankar, A. R. Raihanah, Bamba Bakya	4:51
2.	"Chola Chola"	Ravi Basrur, Nakul Abhyankar	3:40
3.	"Rakshasa Maamane"	Shreya Ghoshal, Vijay Prakash, Mahesh Vinayakram	4:50
4.	"Baradane Chandra"	Antara Nandy	5:14
5.	"Devaralan Aattaa"	Yogi Sekar	4:32
6.	"Hele Neenu"	Sivasri Skandaprasad	2:14
Total length:			25:25

== Reception ==
The music received positive response from critics, praising its periodic setting, instrumentation and soundscape. Suanshu Khurana of The Indian Express gave the album three-and-a-half out of five stars, and reviewed "Alaikadal" as a "soulful composition" and "the best piece on the album"; he further elaborated "From the prelude which is a metered alaap, the scale temperings, the violin interludes, soaring synths, and edgy percussion, the tender melody – a reminder of Tamil music from the '50s – is sung brilliantly and sticks." He further wrote "According to the novel, the Chola kings were devotees of Thevaram – a compendium of hymns in praise of Shiva – or how some of them were also influenced massively by Buddhism [...] Rahman had tapped into the milieu of the time and used music from these traditions. It would have made the current, quite a notable tapestry, more authentic. One understands the limitations of modern film music but if anyone can deliver this balance of the note structures, it's Rahman."

Moviecrow also gave three-and-a-half stars and said "Rahman's soundtrack for the epic Ponniyin Selvan stays true to the story's situations and matches the grandeur needed while the composer's brilliance is also evident in the melodies." Critic Siddharth Srinivas called the album as "a work of genius from AR Rahman, who skilfully puts in a variant and efficient set of songs that work superbly. This is another strong example of his amazing combinations with Mani Ratnam, and it works so well that one cannot stop going back to it." Vipin Nair of Music Aloud stated "Ponniyin Selvan features the best songs that A. R. Rahman has produced for Mani Ratnam in a while". Reviewing the track "Ponni Nadhi", critic based at Pinkvilla praised the composition, instrumentation and Rahman's vocals, stating "The music looks top-notch while Sivamani's thumping beats give us many reasons to be hooked to the magical track. The detailing of the flute in the song by Kamalakar and the violin by Vignesh give a refreshing and mesmerising take to the song altogether. The Indian Express called the song as "rousing and energetic". On reviewing "Chola Chola", a critic from Outlook, praised the use of "global sounds" such as the South Indian folk instruments, percussions and Shehnai played by S. Ballesh, Krishna Ballesh and the orchestra (Chennai Strings Orchestra, Sunshine Orchestra and Budapest Scoring Orchestra) making it an "audio-visual treat".

== Criticism ==
"Ponni Nadhi" received criticism from a section of audiences, who criticised the lyricist Ilango Krishnan, for the lack of nativity, and the similar ideas and phrases exhibited in his lyrics. Vairamuthu's exclusion from the film also met with criticism, as he had an understanding on the Sangam literature. In an interview to The Federal, journalist Lenin Ernesto defended Krishnan saying that he had exhibited the same ideas that Vairamuthu did, comparing that of the song "Thai Thindra Manney", written by him for Selvaraghavan's Aayirathil Oruvan (2010), and added "When the story in the film is said to have taken place some 1,000 years ago, shouldn't the lyricist use the ancient words instead of using colloquial terms?" Speaking to the same magazine, poet Pithan Venkatraj, felt that Rahman's tunes for the track lacked the periodic feel and instead reminded of one of his earlier numbers. He compared the track to "Narumugaye" written by Vairamuthu for Iruvar (1997).

Pirashanth Kamalanathan, a Srilankan-based entrepreneur also explained on Vairamuthu's grasp from the novel helped in describing the character of the antagonist, Neelambari (Ramya Krishnan) in Padayappa (1999), through the lyrics of the song "Minsara Kanna". He also explained on how Aishwarya Rai Bachchan was earlier considered as the original choice for the character, before Ramya Krishnan's involvement (she ironically played Nandhini in Ponniyin Selvan). Other fellow poets and lyricists, also felt that Vairamuthu should be consulted when writing the film's screenplay.
