= Iravin Nizhal =

2022 film directed by R. Parthiban

- Theatrical release poster
- Directed by: R. Parthiban
- Written by: R. Parthiban
- Produced by: Caldwell Velnambi; Anshu Prabhakar; Dr. Pinchi Srinivasan; Bala Swaminathan; Ranjith Dhandapani; R. Parthiban
- Starring: R. Parthiban; Brigida Saga; Varalaxmi Sarathkumar; Robo Shankar; Priyanka Ruth; Anandha Krishnan; Jai Bala
- Cinematography: Arthur A. Wilson
- Music by: A. R. Rahman
- Production companies: Bioscope Film Framers; Akira Film Productions
- Distributed by: V Creations
- Release date: 15 July 2022 (India)
- Country: India
- Language: Tamil

Iravin Nizhal (transl. Shadow of the night) is a 2022 Indian Tamil-language independent thriller film written, produced, co-edited and directed by R. Parthiban under the banner Akira Productions and Bioscope Film Framers. The film stars Radhakrishnan Parthiban, Brigida Saga, Varalaxmi Sarathkumar, Robo Shankar, Sai Priyanka Ruth in the lead roles. The background score and music for the film is composed by A. R. Rahman and the film has six songs. It is touted to Indian cinema's first non-linear single shot film. The film entered the Asia Book of Records and India Book of Records for being the first Asian non-linear single-shot film. Released on July 15, 2022, the film received positive reviews from critics and audiences. At the 69th National Film Awards the film won the award for Best Female Playback Singer for Shreya Ghoshal for the song "Mayava Chayava".

== Plot ==
The film opens with Nandu, a film financier, learning that the cops are about to arrest him, and making a run, with a gun, which he hopes to use ostensibly on Paramaanandha, a fake godman, who is one of those to have put him in this precarious position. As he waits at the godman's dilapidated ashram, he recounts his eventful life, the people who pushed him into darkness, his sins and the one flicker of light that's still part of his life.

His birth resulted from his mother's extramarital affair with their landowner. She's murdered by her husband in a jealous rage. He's raised by neighbours until he runs away aged 10. After being raped by a cop, he's given refuge by a trans-woman, who uses him to deal marijuana. At 18 he falls in love with a girl who seems to reciprocate his feelings, but ends up cheating on him for money, breaking his heart. Then he falls in love with Chilakkamma, a devout girl who reciprocates his feelings. They marry and set up a small shop with the help of a trader who encourages him to get involved in the hawala trade which he's forced to quit when the law catches up, rendering him unable to pay loan sharks who abuse his wife causing her to kill herself.

He seeks refuge at the fake godman's ashram, where he's soon disillusioned upon discovering the latter's true colours. An acolyte who was the godman's consort Prema Kumari exposes him, getting him arrested, to get his wealth. Upon discovering this, Nandu, who has a subsequent affair with, and impregnates her, demands half of it, and kills her when she refuses. He's then haunted by the cries of the unborn foetus.

He then becomes a notorious loan shark. He coerces one of his debtors into marrying him and has a daughter Arputha on whom he showers his love. His wife eventually warms to him. But when they find out that a debtor of his killed himself along with his family due to his harassment, they leave him.

Nandu reflects on all this, and out of guilt, pain and hopelessness he shoots himself dead.

== Cast ==
- R. Parthiban as Nandu
  - Anandhakrishnan as 30 years old Nandu
  - K Chandru as 18 years old Nandu
  - M Praveen Kumar as 14 years old Nandu
  - AR Joshua as 10 year old Nandu
- Brigida Saga as Chilakamma
- Varalaxmi Sarathkumar as Prema Kumari
- Robo Shankar as Paramaanandha
- Sai Priyanka Ruth as Parvathy
- Sneha Kumar as Lakshmi
- Rekha Nair as Nandu's mother
- Jai Bala as Nallathambi
- Prathiksha Shankar as Arputha
- M. J. Shriram as Rauthar

== Production ==
=== Development ===
The film was announced by director R. Parthiban on 1 January 2020 with a poster coinciding with the New Year stating that the film would be produced under his production venture in single shot. However, the film took off late a year later due to the commitments of Parthiban in Mani Ratnam's highly anticipated long-awaited film Ponniyin Selvan and also due to the impact of the COVID-19 pandemic.

=== Cast and crew ===
The film marked the first collaboration between R. Parthiban and A. R. Rahman. Parthiban insisted that he and A. R. Rahman were supposed to work for a film titled Yelelo in 2001 but the film was shelved or dropped for unknown reasons. Parthiban also revealed that he wanted to make a film of this nature after gaining the confidence from his previous directorial Oththa Seruppu Size 7. Arthur A. Wilson was roped in as the cinematographer of the film. Kunal Rajan was roped in as the Supervising sound Designer and Audiography was done by AM Studios Sivakumar .

The film crew includes music composer A. R. Rahman, Craig Mann who worked as a Supervising sound editor for the film, and Cottalango Leon worked as a VFX supervisor for the film.

=== Filming ===
The film was shot entirely in a single take with 136228 frames but the filmmakers incurred a huge budget for the filmmaking. The production team installed 50 sets in 75 acre land in OMR and the film was shot with a non-linear narrative. A rehearsal was also done for about 90 days prior to the shooting of the film.

== Music ==
Iravin Nizhal

Soundtrack album by A. R. Rahman
- Released: 2022
- Genre: Feature film soundtrack
- Length: 25:58
- Label: Dhwani Music
- Producer: A. R. Rahman

A. R. Rahman chronology
Navarasa (2021)	Iravin Nizhal (2022)	Cobra (2022)

The music for the film is composed by A. R. Rahman. Parthiban himself had stated that Rahman was roped in not to give viral hits; but to rather give an album filled with evergreen songs. A single from the music album was released in the presence of A.R. Rahman on 1 May 2022, coinciding with the International Labour Day. The official audio launch of the film was held in Chennai on 5 June 2022 in the presence of Abhishek Bachchan and A. R. Rahman.

Iravin Nizhal (Original Motion Picture Soundtrack)
No.	Title	Lyrics	Artist(s)	Length
1.	"Maayava Thooyava (Tamil, not in movie)"	Madhan Karky	Shreya Ghoshal	4:09
2.	"Kaayam"	R. Parthiban	Khatija Rahman, Soundarya Bala, Veena Murali, Deepthi Suresh, Sowmya, Additional Vocals: Elfe Choir	5:53
3.	"Bejara"	R. Parthiban	Haricharan, Bamba Bakya	3:40
4.	"Paapam Seyathiru"	Kaduveli Siddhar	Harini Ivaturi, Niranjana Ramanan, Keerthana Vaidyanathan	7:07
5.	"Kannethire"	R. Parthiban	Sarthak Kalyani, Hiral Viradia	3:53
6.	"Shadow of the Night"		A. R. Rahman	1:18

== Marketing ==
On 2 February 2022, the filmmakers released a video clip from the film and the first look poster was unveiled on 19 March 2022 by veteran director Mani Ratnam in his official Twitter handle, which was also later unveiled by Madras Talkies in Twitter. The official teaser of the film was released on 1 May 2022 in YouTube coinciding with the May Day.

== Release ==
=== Theatrical ===
The film was released theatrically on 15 July 2022 along with Ram Pothineni’s starrer The Warriorr which was released one day before the film.

=== Home media ===
The post-theatrical streaming rights of the film were bought by Amazon Prime Video, while the satellite rights of the film has been sold to Kalaignar TV. The film was digitally streamed through the streaming platform from 1 November 2022. The film was telecast through Kalaignar TV on 25 June 2023.

== Reception ==
On the review aggregator website Rotten Tomatoes, 60% of 5 critics' reviews are positive, with an average rating of 6.7/10.

Director Seenu Ramasamy heaped praise on the film calling it as a lighthouse to Tamil cinema. Ganesh Aaglave of Firstpost after reviewing the film wrote "Courage and foolishness sail in the same boat. If an idea works, the ideator will be hailed as a trailblazer. And if it doesn’t work, the ideator will be called a fool. It’s as simple as that. And since Iravin Nizhal comes with many labels attached to it, I’d say it’s a courageous project. It’d have been a better movie, however, if the story had more depth than a two-litre water bottle." Srivatsan S of The Hindu after reviewing the film wrote "Nevertheless, Parthiban does dare to dream big. He seems to enjoy taking risks, outdoing himself. Keep daring, Parthiban." Manoj Kumar R of The Indian Express gave 3 out of 5 stars stating that "Parthiban has a reputation to keep. He is expected to do something different every time he makes a movie. And so he keeps inventing new ways to tell a story. But, it seems he isn’t changing the story much. He is just changing the way he tells it." M Suganth of The Times of India gave 3.5 out of 5 stars and stated "There are several moments when you marvel at the smoothness with which the scenes transition from one time period to the next. Parthiban also uses music (AR Rahman, whose stirring score is like a ray of light in this film's dark world) sound effects cleverly to make us forget that entire film has been shot in one place, inside the huge set that we are shown in the making-of video. In that sense, this 'project' is definitely a success as Parthiban achieves what he set out to do."

Saibal Chatterjee of NDTV wrote "But in the end, in terms of its style and spunk, Iravin Nizhal ploughs its own distinct furrow. It is a movie unlike any other." R. Krishnakumar of Deccan Herald rated the film 3.5 out of 5 and wrote "Parthiban sets the episodic flashbacks to good pace, their staging elevated by a terrific score from A R Rahman." Bharathy Singaravel of The News Minute rated 2.5 out of 5 stars and wrote "Iravin Nizhal is at the least a crashing bore; at the worst, single-take magic aside, a noxious mix of misogyny and self-indulgence." Soundarya Athimuthu of The Quint rated 3 out of 5 stars and called the film "A phenomenal addition to Parthiban's unique list of films". Gopinath Rajendran of The New Indian Express rated the film 3.5 out of 5 stars and wrote " The film shows that with excellent workmanship and technological mastery, the boundaries of storytelling and filmmaking can be pushed to great limits—and sometimes, even if the story isn’t great, this is its own type of gratification." Vijaya Shankar of DT Next rated the film 4.5 out of 5 stars and wrote that "Iravin Nizhal too comes with its flaws like its protagonist Nandhu but is an impressive experiment with technical mastery and unconventional storytelling from a filmmaker who always wants to give the audience something new and unique, which needs to be appreciated." Ananda Vikatan rated the film 42 out of 100.
