= Ponniyin Selvan: I =

2022 Indian film by Mani Ratnam

- Theatrical release poster
- Directed by: Mani Ratnam
- Screenplay by: Mani Ratnam; Elango Kumaravel; B. Jeyamohan
- Based on: Ponniyin Selvan by Kalki Krishnamurthy
- Produced by: Mani Ratnam Subaskaran Allirajah
- Starring: Vikram; Aishwarya Rai Bachchan; Karthi; Ravi Mohan; Trisha Krishnan; Prabhu; Aishwarya Lekshmi; Sobhita Dhulipala; Jayaram; Prakash Raj
- Narrated by: Kamal Haasan
- Cinematography: Ravi Varman
- Edited by: A. Sreekar Prasad
- Music by: A. R. Rahman
- Production company: Madras Talkies Lyca Productions
- Distributed by: Red Giant Movies
- Release date: 30 September 2022
- Running time: 167 minutes
- Country: India
- Language: Tamil
- Budget: See production
- Box office: est.₹500 crore (Note: Ponniyin Selvan: I's reported worldwide gross is ₹500 crore according to Hindustan Times, Outlook India, News18, and The Economic Times.)

Ponniyin Selvan: I (PS-1, transl. The Son of Ponni) is a 2022 Indian Tamil-language epic historical fiction action drama film directed by Mani Ratnam, who co-wrote it with Elango Kumaravel and B. Jeyamohan. Produced by Ratnam and Subaskaran Allirajah under Madras Talkies and Lyca Productions, it is the first of two cinematic parts loosely based on Kalki Krishnamurthy's 1955 novel, Ponniyin Selvan. The film stars an ensemble cast including Vikram, Aishwarya Rai Bachchan, Karthi, Ravi Mohan (as the title character), Trisha Krishnan, Jayaram, Aishwarya Lekshmi, Sobhita Dhulipala, Prakash Raj, Prabhu, R. Sarathkumar, R. Parthiban, Jayachitra, Rahman, Lal, Vikram Prabhu and others. The music was composed by A. R. Rahman, with cinematography by Ravi Varman, editing by A. Sreekar Prasad, and production design by Thota Tharani. Ponniyin Selvan: I dramatises the early life of Chola prince Arulmozhi Varman, who would become the renowned emperor Rajaraja I (947–1014). In the film, Vandiyathevan sets out to cross the Chola land to deliver a message from the crown prince Aditha Karikalan. Meanwhile, Kundavai attempts to establish political peace as vassals and petty chieftains plot against the throne.

Ever since its publication, a film adaptation of the novel Ponniyin Selvan had been explored by several Tamil filmmakers, including an attempt by M. G. Ramachandran in the late 1950s; however, it never materialised. Decades later, Ratnam attempted to adapt the novel in the late-1980s and early-2010s but was unsuccessful due to financial constraints. He eventually managed to revive the effort in January 2019, after Lyca agreed to fund the film. Following several changes in cast and crew, production of Ponniyin Selvan began in December 2019 and concluded in September 2021, halting twice due to the COVID-19 pandemic. The film was shot in various locations across India, with a few sequences in Thailand. It was originally intended to be a single film but was split into two parts.

Ponniyin Selvan: I was released in theatres worldwide on 30 September 2022 in standard and IMAX formats. Ponniyin Selvan: I met with critical acclaim, with emphasis on the direction, musical score, technical aspects, and the cast's performances. The film grossed ₹450–488 crore worldwide, becoming the highest-grossing Tamil film of 2022, third-highest-grossing Indian film of 2022. The film is currently the fourth highest-grossing Tamil film of all time. The film received six nominations at the 16th Asian Film Awards, including Best Film. It won the Best Tamil film award at the 68th Filmfare Awards South. The film also won four National Awards, in the 70th National Film Awards, announced on 16 August 2024, including the National Film Award for Best Tamil Feature Film. Its sequel was released on 28 April 2023.

== Plot ==
In the 10th century, the Chola Empire enjoys unprecedented expansion under the ailing Emperor Sundara Chola. His eldest son, Crown Prince Adithya Karikalan, commands the northern front from Kanchi, while his younger son, Arulmozhi Varman, leads an imperial military expedition in Lanka. Following a decisive victory over the rival Rashtrakuta dynasty, Karikalan senses an impending domestic coup. He dispatches his charismatic, trusted lieutenant, Vallavaraiyan Vandiyadevan, a prince of the fallen Vana clan, on a clandestine mission to investigate the political climate, ordering him to deliver critical messages to Sundara Chola in Thanjavur and Karikalan's sister, Princess Kundavai, in Pazhayarai.

During his journey, Vandiyadevan secures lodging at the fort of a Chola vassal in Kadambur. There, he uncovers a treasonous council orchestrated by Periya Pazhuvettaraiyar, the imperial finance minister, and several disgruntled chieftains. The conspirators plot to bypass Karikalan and elevate Madhurantakan, the emperor's cousin, to the Chola throne upon Sundara Chola's death. In tandem, Vandiyadevan encounters Azhwarkkadiyan Nambi, a traveling Vaishnavite spy who is tracking his estranged foster sister, Nandini. Nandini, harboring a deep-seated hatred for the Chola royal bloodline, has climbed the ranks of power by marrying the much older Periya Pazhuvettaraiyar, using her position to manipulate the council of conspirators from the shadows.

Utilizing a royal signet ring deceitfully obtained through Nandini, Vandiyadevan gains entry into the heavily guarded palace of Thanjavur. He successfully warns a bedridden Sundara Chola of the impending subversion. Chinna Pazhuvettaraiyar, the commander of the Thanjavur fort and Periya Pazhuvettaraiyar's brother, suspects Vandiyadevan's motives and orders his arrest, but he escapes. Vandiyadevan flees to Pazhayarai and briefs Princess Kundavai, who resides alongside Queen Mother Sembiyan Madevi and Princess Vaanathi. Recognizing the severe danger to the dynasty, Kundavai instructs Vandiyadevan to travel to Lanka immediately to escort Arulmozhi Varman back to the capital to stabilize the kingdom.

Concurrently, Aditha Karikalan confides his tragic history to his close friend, Parthibendra Pallavan. Years earlier, a young Karikalan had been deeply in love with Nandini, but the Chola royals banished her due to her mysterious, low-born origins, following which she was fostered by the Pandya king Veerapandiyan. During a subsequent military campaign against the rival Pandya Kingdom, a vengeful Karikalan decapitated the defeated Veerapandiyan, despite Nandini's desperate pleas to spare his life. This act ignited Nandini’s absolute vendetta against the Chola line, prompting her to align with the Pandya Abathudavigal, a fanatical subterranean group of Pandya assassins seeking to eradicate the royal family.

In Lanka, Vandiyadevan enlists the aid of Poonguzhali, a skilled boatwoman, to navigate the coastal waters. He locates Arulmozhi Varman and delivers Kundavai's request. Concurrently, Periya Pazhuvettaraiyar manipulates the vulnerable emperor into issuing an official warrant to arrest Arulmozhi Varman on charges of treason under the pretext of bringing him back to Thanjavur. Despite pleas from his generals to rebel against the corrupt administration, Arulmozhi Varman chooses to honor his father's absolute authority and surrenders to the imperial navy.

Before the fleet can sail, the Pandya assassins launch a coordinated assault to eliminate the Chola prince. Mistaking Vandiyadevan for Arulmozhi Varman due to a swap of armor, the insurgents capture him and board a getaway vessel. Arulmozhi Varman boards the enemy ship to rescue his friend, but a violent cyclone strikes the ocean, tearing the fleet apart. Both men disappear beneath the waves and are universally presumed dead.

The catastrophic news of Arulmozhi Varman's alleged death sends shockwaves throughout the empire. Grief-stricken and half-mad with rage, Aditha Karikalan leaves Kanchi for Thanjavur, determined to confront Nandini and meet his fate. Meanwhile, off the coast of Lanka, the mysterious Oomai Rani (the Mute Queen), an enigmatic, elderly lookalike of Nandini who had previously saved Arulmozhi Varman from drowning in his childhood, dives deep into the stormy sea, rescuing the prince from the ocean floor.

== Cast ==
- Vikram as Adithya Karikalan
  - Santhosh as Young Adithya
- Aishwarya Rai Bachchan in a dual role:
  - as Nandini (Voice-over by Deepa Venkat)
    - Sara Arjun as Young Nandini
  - as Mandakini Devi ("Oomai Rani")
- Karthi as Vallavaraiyan Vandiyadevan
- Ravi Mohan as Rajaraja The Great / Arulmozhi Varman "Ponniyin Selvan"
- Trisha Krishnan as Kundavai Pirattiyar (Voice-over by Krithika Nelson)
- Aishwarya Lekshmi as Poonguzhali (Voice-over by Ashmini Balakrishnan)
- Sobhita Dhulipala as Vanathi (Voice-over by Smruthi K)
- Jayaram as Alwarkadiyan Nambi
- Prabhu as Periya Vellar Boothi Vikramakesari
- R. Sarathkumar as Periya Pazhuvettarayar
- Vikram Prabhu as Parthibendran Pallavan
- Prakash Raj as Sundara Chozhar
- Jayachitra as Sembiyan Mahadevi
- Rahman as Madhurantakan (Voice-over by Azhagam Perumal)
- Ashwin Kakumanu as Sendhan Amudhan
- Lal as Malayaman
- Kishore as Ravidasan
- Babu Antony as Khottiga Amogavarshan
- R. Parthiban as Chinna Pazhuvettaraiyar
- Nassar as Veera Pandiyan
- Nizhalgal Ravi as Sambuvaraiyar
- Mohan Raman as Aniruddha Brahmarayar
- Vinodhini Vaidyanathan as Vasuki
- Shyam Fernando as Mahindan
- Balaji Sakthivel as Vanangamudiyar
- Yog Japee as Karuthiruman
- Riyaz Khan as Soman Sambavan
- Vidhya Subramanian as Vaanavan Maadevi
- Arjun Chidambaram as Varagunan
- Nimmy Raphael as Rakkamma
- Vinay Kumar Joseph as Devaralan
- Harris Moosa as Kalapathi
- Gopi Kannadasan as Dambulla Bikshu
- Bharat Raj as Karka
- A. Seemon as Ugradevan
- Suresh Ekambaram as Aadhan Maran
- Aswin Rao as Kandhamaran
- Anil Kumar as Pasupathi
- Shakti Ramani as Kani
- Raghav as Amarabujanga Pandiyan
- Ramchandran as Rajaaliyar
- Jaichandran as Thanthongi Kalingarayar
- Amzath Khan as Mazhavarayar
- Kannan as Kundrathur Kizhar
- Sundaram as Mazhapadi Thennavan
- Jaindhan as Mummudi Pallavarayar
- Nambi as Muttharayar
- Balla Bhoopalan as Idumbankari

The film's narration was voiced by Kamal Haasan (both trailer and film), Anil Kapoor (trailer)/Ajay Devgn (film), Rana Daggubati (trailer)/Chiranjeevi (film), Prithviraj Sukumaran (trailer)/Mammootty (film) and Jayanth Kaikini (trailer)/Upendra (film) in the Tamil, Hindi, Telugu, Malayalam, and Kannada languages respectively.

== Music ==
The film score and soundtrack were composed by Mani Ratnam's regular collaborator A. R. Rahman. The audio rights of the film were purchased by Tips.

The soundtrack consists of six original songs composed by A.R.Rahman, namely, "Ponni Nadhi", "Chola Chola", "Ratchasa Maamaney", "Sol", "Alaikadal" and "Devaralan Aattam". Lyrics were written by Ilango Krishnan, Kabilan, Krithika Nelson and Siva Ananth in the Tamil version and Mehboob Kotwal, Anantha Sriram, Rafeeq Ahamed and Jayanth Kaikini wrote the song lyrics in Hindi, Telugu, Malayalam and Kannada respectively.

== Marketing ==
Promotional campaign for the film was supposed to begin in July 2022, with the film's teaser trailer planned to be launched at the Brihadisvara Temple in Thanjavur, the city which served as the capital for the Chola Empire. Following the launch event, the team also planned a promotional tour for the film. The movie team later on decided to have a grand teaser trailer launch event in Chennai as per their previous schedule on 8 July 2022. The film's teaser trailer was released on 8 July 2022 in Tamil and dubbed versions of Hindi, Telugu, Malayalam and Kannada languages.

The film's trailer and songs were released by the special guests Rajinikanth and Kamal Haasan on 6 September 2022 at the Nehru indoor stadium in Tamil and dubbed versions of Hindi, Telugu, Malayalam and Kannada languages. The trailer featured Kamal Haasan voice-over in the Tamil version and Anil Kapoor, Rana Daggubati, Prithviraj Sukumaran and Jayanth Kaikini voice-overs in Hindi, Telugu, Malayalam and Kannada version of the trailer respectively. Posters featuring Sarathkumar, Parthiban, Aishwarya Lekshmi, Sobhita Dhulipala, Prakash Raj, Jayachithra, Rahman, Vikram Prabhu, Prabhu, Lal and Jayaram were released before the trailer launch event.

== Release ==
=== Theatrical ===
Ponniyin Selvan: I released on 30 September 2022 worldwide. It was released in Tamil along with the dubbed versions of Hindi, Kannada, Telugu and Malayalam languages. It was previously scheduled to release on summer (May–July) 2022, but was postponed due to production works. It became the first Tamil film to release in IMAX format.

The film's release across Canada was disrupted after major theatre chains Cineplex and Landmark Cinemas refused to exhibit the film due to ongoing anonymous threats of vandalism if Tamil films were released in their locations. The attacks, which have happened during screenings of Theri (2016) and Kurup (2021), are alleged to have been conducted by owners of Woodside Cinemas and York Cinemas, a local theatre chain in Toronto attempting to hold monopoly of screening Tamil films. Ponniyin Selvan: I had a limited Canadian release in select private theatres amidst protection from law enforcement. It was also released in TIFF Bell Lightbox, home of the Toronto International Film Festival, a first for a Tamil film premiere.

=== Distribution ===
The distribution rights of the film in Tamil Nadu were acquired by Red Giant Movies. The Andhra Pradesh and Telangana distribution rights were bagged by Sri Venkateswara Creations and Dil Raju. The Kerala distribution rights of the film was bagged by Gokulam Gopalan's Sree Gokulam Movies. The overseas theatrical rights of the film were acquired by TentKotta. The North India distribution rights were acquired by Pen India Limited.

=== Home media ===
The digital streaming rights for the film were purchased by Amazon Prime Video for ₹125 crore (US$13 million). The film was digitally premiered on Amazon Prime Video from 4 November 2022 in Tamil and dubbed versions of Telugu, Malayalam and Kannada languages. The Hindi dubbed version was released on 26 November 2022 on the platform.

== Reception ==
=== Critical response ===
On the review aggregator website Rotten Tomatoes, 87% of 15 critics' reviews are positive, with an average rating of 7.4/10. Ponniyin Selvan: I met with critical acclaim, with emphasis on the direction, musical score, technical aspects, and the cast's performances.

Kirubhakar Purushothaman of The Indian Express rated the film 4 out of 5 stars and wrote "Mani Ratnam understands Kalki's novel is a mainstream page-turner, so he retains its flavour and neither intellectualises it nor dumbs it down". Sonil Dedhia of News 18 rated the film 4 out of 5 stars and wrote "Ponniyan Selvan 1 is an engaging, involving movie-going experience, and proves once again why Mani Ratnam is one of India's finest filmmakers". Sowmya Rajendran of The News Minute rated the film 4 out of 5 stars and wrote "The film does not try to amplify any aspect of the novel unnecessarily to fit a narrative that might be the flavour of the season. In fact, it downplays the praise that Kalki lavished on the Chola Empire". Stutee Ghosh of The Quint rated the film 4 out of 5 stars and wrote "Ponniyin Selvan 1 is grand and royal but unlike the bombastic, hyper-masculine world we are used to seeing these days with overwhelming VFX and CGI, here Mani Ratnam's hold on the narrative never slips". Sukanya Verma of Rediff rated the film 4 out of 5 stars and wrote "Mani Ratnam's eye for intimacy, enigma, humour and menace bring out the glory of its source and all the imagination in store. One seldom thinks of Mani Ratnam's excellence in terms of VFX but Ponniyin Selvan: 1 goes full steam".

Krishna Selvaseelan of Tamil Guardian rated the film 4.5 out of 5 stars, writing, "The visuals are stunning. Ravi Varman captures the world of 10th century Thamizhakam (and its subcontinent) expertly, bringing life to the world." Ritika Handoo of Zee News rated the film 4 out of 5 stars and wrote "The beauty of Part one of the two-part film lies in the fact that Mani Ratnam has not only made the story concise but has managed to do so carefully, taking adequate care not to dilute the essence of the novel or its charm". Sudhir Srinivasan of Cinema Express rated the film 4 out of 5 stars and wrote "Perhaps the foremost pleasure of a Mani Ratnam film is in experiencing his wizardry over the medium. We see plenty of evidence of this in Ponniyin Selvan 1". Saibal Chatterjee of NDTV rated the film 4 out of 5 stars and wrote "The sprawling, spectacularly mounted film is an ambitious, near-flawless adaptation of a much-loved literary work". Devesh Sharma of Filmfare rated the film 4 out of 5 stars and wrote "Watch the film for its visual grandeur, epic action sequences and some sublime acting by the entire cast". Sanjana Deshpande of The Free Press Journal rated the film 4 out of 5 stars and wrote "the cherry on top of the cake was the cinematography by Ravi Varman. He catches the attention of the audience and never lets it go. Each shot is carefully placed and executed. There's so much nuance in the film that is hard to put down in words, it is best experienced!". IANS rated the film 4 out of 5 stars and wrote "Mani Ratnam's 'Ponniyin Selvan – Part I' is a masterpiece that deserves all your adulation and love".

M. Suganth of The Times of India rated the film 3.5 out of 5 stars and wrote "Mani Ratnam's adaptation of Kalki's Ponniyin Selvan is spectacular", adding "Mani Ratnam finally brings the dream alive with this spectacular adaptation that superbly captures the intrigue, thrills and page-turning quality of the books." Soumyabrata Gupta of Zoom rated the film 3.5 out of 5 stars and wrote "Perhaps not a film for the masses, Ponniyin Selvan 1 will ultimately be a cult classic, in time". Vivek M V of Deccan Herald rated the film 3.5 out of 5 stars and wrote "Ponniyin Selvan is a winner because Ratnam shows a new way to make epic films". Priyanka Sundar of Firstpost rated the film 3.5 out of 5 stars and termed it as a "brilliant experience" which doesn't chase the same high as other recent commercial films did. The spectacle lies in the setting and the story of the film that unravels beautifully. Bharathi Pradhan of Lehren rated the film 3.5 out of 5 stars and termed the film as "Royal and Spectacular". Anupama Subramanian of Deccan Chronicle rated the film 3.5 out of 5 stars and wrote "Ponniyin Selvan is a bit like Game of Thrones without as much grisly violence. The polished cast and crew will keep you engaged". Movie Herald's Felix said 'Glorious attempt which was effective but too delicate'

Janani K of India Today rated the film 3 out of 5 stars and wrote "Technically, Ponniyin Selvan is top-notch. Be it Ravi Varman's brilliant cinematography or AR Rahman's excellent score, the film sucks us into the world that Mani Ratnam has created with so much detailing." The Hans India rated the film 3 out of 5 stars and wrote "PS 1 is a fascinating drama narrating an epic historical story. Mani Ratnam brought the best of everything on screen for his dream project. The casting and AR Rahman's background score stand as the main highlights of the film. PS 1 is more about drama and less about action" Lakshmi Subramanian of The Week rated the film 2.5 out of 5 stars and wrote "Kalki's book gets Mani Ratnam's royal cinematic touch but lacks powerful storytelling". Haricharan Pudipeddi of Hindustan Times stated "Mani Ratnam has managed the unthinkable—adapt the literary classic with finesse and impact. All actors do their parts well but Aishwarya Rai is a revelation". Likewise, Srinivasa Ramanujam of The Hindu gave the film a positive review, noting that an "epic story gets Mani Ratnam's royal treatment", while adding "Kalki's source material of PS:1 is rich with myriad characters, and Mani Ratnam gleefully picks them all up to give it a cinematic touch, thanks to some powerhouse performances from his all-star cast".

=== Box office ===
The film earned around ₹80 crore (US$8.3 million) on its opening day worldwide and debuted at the top of box offices in Singapore, Malaysia, Sri Lanka, and Australia, while it reached the top 3 in the United States. By its third day, the film earned around ₹80 crore (US$8.3 million) taking its first weekend worldwide collection to ₹230 crore (US$24 million). The film performed exceptionally well in Tamil Nadu, Kerala and overseas market, but performed average in Karnataka, the Telugu states, and the Hindi belt. The dubbed Hindi version grossed ₹22 crore (US$2.3 million) at the domestic box office. Nonetheless, the film emerged as the highest grossing Tamil movie in Malaysia, Singapore, United States, Australia and the 5th highest grossing Indian movie in the US at that time.

=== Controversies ===
Ponniyin Selvan was initially involved in a controversy about ignoring the Shaivite nature of the Cholas and using the Sricharanam instead of Tripundra on the forehead. Ahead of its release, this was corrected with visual effects and almost all Chola characters appear with a VFX Pattai in the released film series. Also, the assassins behind Aditha Karikalan were not shown to be all as Brahmins as in history whose names were mentioned in Udayarkudi inscriptions.

== Accolades ==
Award ceremony	Year	Category	Nominee / Work	Result	Ref.
Ananda Vikatan Cinema Awards	2023	Best Film	Ponniyin Selvan: I	Nominated	
Ananda Vikatan Cinema Awards	2023	Best Director	Mani Ratnam	Nominated	
Ananda Vikatan Cinema Awards	2023	Best Actor	Karthi (Note: Karthi was nominated for two films – Ponniyin Selvan: I and Sardar)	Nominated	
Ananda Vikatan Cinema Awards	2023	Best Actor	Vikram (Note: Vikram was nominated for three films – Ponniyin Selvan: I, Mahaan and Cobra)	Nominated	
Ananda Vikatan Cinema Awards	2023	Best Actress	Trisha	Nominated	
Ananda Vikatan Cinema Awards	2023	Best Actress in a Negative Role	Aishwarya Rai Bachchan	Won	
Ananda Vikatan Cinema Awards	2023	Best Music Director	A. R. Rahman (Note: A. R. Rahman won the award for three films – Ponniyin Selvan: I, Vendhu Thanindhathu Kaadu and Cobra)	Won	
Ananda Vikatan Cinema Awards	2023	Best Lyricist	Ilango Krishnan for "Ponni Nadhi" and "Chola Chola"	Nominated	
Ananda Vikatan Cinema Awards	2023	Best Lyricist	Kapilan for "Ratchasa Maamaney"	Nominated	
Ananda Vikatan Cinema Awards	2023	Best Playback Singer – Female	Shreya Ghosal for "Ratchasa Maamaney" (Note: Shreya Ghosal was nominated for two songs – "Ratchasa Maamaney" from Ponniyin Selvan: I and "Maayava Thooyava" from Iravin Nizhal)	Nominated	
Ananda Vikatan Cinema Awards	2023	Best Choreographer	Brinda for "Devaralan Attam"	Nominated	
Ananda Vikatan Cinema Awards	2023	Best Cinematographer	Ravi Varman	Won	
Ananda Vikatan Cinema Awards	2023	Best Editor	Sreekar Prasad	Nominated	
Ananda Vikatan Cinema Awards	2023	Best Art Director	Thota Tharani	Won	
Ananda Vikatan Cinema Awards	2023	Best Dialogue Writer	B. Jeyamohan	Nominated	
Ananda Vikatan Cinema Awards	2023	Best Makeup	Vikram Gaikwad	Won	
Ananda Vikatan Cinema Awards	2023	Best Costume Designer	Eka Lakhani	Won	
Ananda Vikatan Cinema Awards	2023	Best Visual Effects	NY VFXWaala	Won	
Ananda Vikatan Cinema Awards	2023	Best Production	Lyca Productions, Madras Talkies	Won	
Ananda Vikatan Cinema Awards	2023	Best Cast and Crew	Ponniyin Selvan: I	Nominated	
Asian Film Awards	2023	Best Film	Ponniyin Selvan: I	Nominated	
Asian Film Awards	2023	Best Editing	A. Sreekar Prasad	Nominated	
Asian Film Awards	2023	Best Cinematography	Ravi Varman	Nominated	
Asian Film Awards	2023	Best Music	A. R. Rahman	Nominated	
Asian Film Awards	2023	Best Costume Design	Eka Lakhani	Nominated	
Asian Film Awards	2023	Best Production Design	Thota Tharani	Nominated	
Critics' Choice Film Awards	2023	Best Actor	Karthi	Nominated	
Critics' Choice Film Awards	2023	Best Cinematographer	Ravi Varman	Nominated	
Kerala Film Critics Awards	2023	Best Non-Malayalam Movie	Ponniyin Selvan: I	Won	
Nickelodeon Kids' Choice Awards India	2023	Favourite Song (South)	"Ponni Nadhi"	Nominated	
Norway Tamil Film Festival Awards	2023	Best Film	Ponniyin Selvan: I	Won	
Norway Tamil Film Festival Awards	2023	Best Director	Mani Ratnam	Won	
Norway Tamil Film Festival Awards	2023	Best Male Actor	Karthi	Won	
Norway Tamil Film Festival Awards	2023	Best Music Director	A. R. Rahman	Won	
Norway Tamil Film Festival Awards	2023	Best Lyricist	Ilango Krishnan for "Ponni Nadhi"	Won	
Norway Tamil Film Festival Awards	2023	K.S.Balachandran Award	Jayaram	Won	
SIIMA Awards	2023	Best Film – Tamil	Ponniyin Selvan: I	Won	
SIIMA Awards	2023	Best Director – Tamil	Mani Ratnam	Nominated	
SIIMA Awards	2023	Best Actor – Tamil	Vikram (Note: Vikram was nominated for two films – Ponniyin Selvan: I and Mahaan)	Nominated	
SIIMA Awards	2023	Best Actress – Tamil	Trisha	Won	
SIIMA Awards	2023	Best Music Director – Tamil	A. R. Rahman	Nominated	
SIIMA Awards	2023	Best Lyricist – Tamil	Ilango Krishnan for "Ponni Nadhi"	Won	
SIIMA Awards	2023	Best Female Playback Singer – Tamil	Antara Nandy for "Alaikadal"	Nominated	
SIIMA Awards	2023	Best Female Playback Singer – Tamil	Rakshita Suresh for "Sol"	Nominated	
SIIMA Awards	2023	Best Cinematographer – Tamil	Ravi Varman	Won	
SIIMA Awards	2023	Best Art Director	Thota Tharani	Won	
Filmfare Awards South	2024	Best Film – Tamil	Ponniyin Selvan: I	Won	
Filmfare Awards South	2024	Best Director – Tamil	Mani Ratnam	Won	
Filmfare Awards South	2024	Best Actor – Tamil	Karthi	Nominated	
Filmfare Awards South	2024	Best Actor – Tamil	Vikram	Nominated	
Filmfare Awards South	2024	Best Actress – Tamil	Aishwarya Rai Bachchan	Nominated	
Filmfare Awards South	2024	Best Actress – Tamil	Trisha	Nominated	
Filmfare Awards South	2024	Best Supporting Actress – Tamil	Aishwarya Lekshmi	Nominated	
Filmfare Awards South	2024	Best Music Director – Tamil	A. R. Rahman	Won	
Filmfare Awards South	2024	Best Lyricist – Tamil	Ilango Krishnan for "Ponni Nadhi"	Nominated	
Filmfare Awards South	2024	Best Lyricist – Tamil	Ilango Krishnan for "Devaralan Aattam"	Nominated	
Filmfare Awards South	2024	Best Female Playback Singer – Tamil	Antara Nandy for "Alaikadal"	Won	
Filmfare Awards South	2024	Best Cinematography	Ravi Varman	Won	
National Film Awards	2024	Best Tamil Film	Ponniyin Selvan: I	Won	
National Film Awards	2024	Best Cinematography	Ravi Varman	Won	
National Film Awards	2024	Best Music Direction (Background Score)	A. R. Rahman	Won	
National Film Awards	2024	Best Sound Design	Anand Krishnamoorthi	Won	

== Sequel ==
On 17 September 2022, Ratnam in a press meet, confirmed that Ponniyin Selvan: II (PS:2) would be released in six to nine months after the theatrical release of Ponniyin Selvan: I. On 28 December 2022, it was revealed by the unit that PS:2 would be releasing on 28 April 2023.
