= Vikram (soundtrack) =

2022 soundtrack album by Anirudh Ravichander

- Soundtrack album cover

Soundtrack album by Anirudh Ravichander
- Released: 15 May 2022
- Recorded: 2021–2022
- Studios: Albuquerque Records, Chennai; Krimson Avenue Studios, Chennai
- Genre: Feature film soundtrack
- Length: 15:52
- Language: Tamil
- Label: Sony Music India
- Producer: Anirudh Ravichander

Anirudh Ravichander chronology
Don (2022)	Vikram (2022)	Thiruchitrambalam (2022)

Singles from Vikram
- 1. "Pathala Pathala" Released: 11 May 2022

Vikram is the soundtrack album composed by Anirudh Ravichander for the 2022 Indian Tamil-language action thriller film of the same name directed by Lokesh Kanagaraj. Produced by Raaj Kamal Films International, the film features an ensemble cast with Kamal Haasan, Vijay Sethupathi and Fahadh Faasil in lead roles. The film marks Anirudh's second collaboration with Lokesh after Master (2021), and his first with Haasan, respectively.

Haasan, along with Vishnu Edavan and Heisenberg, wrote lyrics for the five-song soundtrack. The first track from the film, "Pathala Pathala", sung by Haasan was released as the lead single from the album on 11 May 2022, and the album was released by Sony Music India on 15 May and received several million views on YouTube. The release coincided with a promotional event held at the Jawaharlal Nehru Indoor Stadium in Chennai, featuring the cast and crew, and other prominent celebrities in attendance. The soundtrack received positive response from critics and audiences appreciating Anirudh, for the compositions, musical approach and style.

== Production ==
The album marked Anirudh's first collaboration with Kamal Haasan. It was intended to be his second film with the actor as Anirudh had previously signed to score for S. Shankar's Indian 2 and had composed all the tunes during December 2017 and 2018. The film's troubled production and the significant delays that it had caused, led Vikram to be the first film released from this collaboration. Lokesh Kanagaraj, insisted Anirudh's inclusion in the film, after previously working on Master.

Speaking to Ananda Vikatan, Lokesh had opined that Anirudh had "effortlessly created all the songs in the film, which he did never before for an action film". Anirudh worked continuously for 55–60 hours for Vikram's soundtrack. He also worked on the background score from early-May 2022, and did final mixing on the score, three days before the film's release.

== Album information ==
"Pathala Pathala" was the lead single from the album, released on 11 May 2022. Written and sung by Haasan, it is a kuthu number, also featuring lines about politics and social issues. The song was recorded during May 2022 at Anirudh's Albuquerque Records studio in Chennai. It is choreographed by Sandy, and was shot at the outskirts of a railway station in Chennai. Haasan revealed the track as "one of his favourites from the album". The song was dubbed and released as "Mathuga Mathuga" in Telugu and "Badle Badle" in Hindi, for the soundtracks of Vikram Hitlist (dubbed versions of the film). While Haasan also sang for the dubbed versions, the Hindi version additionally featured an extended demo with rap verses performed by Raftaar.

"Porkanda Singam" is performed by Ravi G, who previously sang the tracks "Uyir Nadhi Kalangudhe" from Vedalam (2015) and "Naan Pizhai" from Kaathuvaakula Rendu Kaadhal (2022) composed by Anirudh. It is a melancholic number, focusing on the emotional side of Haasan's character, as he raises his grandson. The track also featured an EDM remixed version, with lyrics different to the original track. The track was released as a bonus track on 24 June 2022.

The title track of the film featured a remixed version of the title song, sung by Haasan, from the identically named 1986 film, and was used as minor cues for the track. The tracks were written by Vishnu Edavan, an assistant of Lokesh, who previously wrote two songs for the Master soundtrack. With "Porkanda Singam", being written first by Edavan, he sent few lyrics of the track to Lokesh, who appreciated it for being "emotional and touching". The album also featured, two songs with English lyrics, "Wasted" and "Once Upon a Time", both were written by Heisenberg and sung by Anirudh.

== Release ==
The audio rights of the film were purchased by Sony Music. It was speculated that the makers planned to conduct the film's audio launch in United Arab Emirates. In May 2022, the producers officially announced that the film's audio launch event will be held at the Jawaharlal Nehru Indoor Stadium, Chennai on 15 May 2022.

Being the "first major audio launch event from Tamil cinema" after restrictions on public gatherings due to COVID-19 pandemic being lifted in Tamil Nadu, the event saw the attendance of prominent celebrities including actor Silambarasan, MLA and DMK politician Udhayanidhi Stalin and director Pa. Ranjith, amongst the film's cast and crew, while it was reported that actors Rajinikanth, Vijay and Suriya, will also be present at the event, which did not happen. The event was not broadcast live and instead it was aired on Star Vijay on 22 May 2022.

== Track listing ==
Tamil
No.	Title	Lyrics	Singer(s)	Length
1.	"Pathala Pathala"	Kamal Haasan	Kamal Haasan, Anirudh Ravichander	3:31
2.	"Vikram" (Title Track)	Vishnu Edavan	Anirudh Ravichander	3:36
3.	"Wasted"	Heisenberg	Anirudh Ravichander	3:03
4.	"Porkanda Singam"	Vishnu Edavan	Ravi G	3:18
5.	"Once Upon A Time"	Heisenberg	Anirudh Ravichander	2:24
Total length:				15:52

Extended Soundtrack
No.	Title	Lyrics	Singer(s)	Length
1.	"Porkanda Singam" (EDM Version)	Vishnu Edavan	Anirudh Ravichander	2:29
Total length:				2:29

Telugu
No.	Title	Lyrics	Singer(s)	Length
1.	"Mathuga Mathuga"	Chandrabose	Kamal Haasan	3:31
2.	"Vikram" (Title Track)	Ramajogayya Sastry	Prudhvi Chandra	3:38
3.	"Wasted"	Heisenberg	Anirudh Ravichander	3:02
4.	"Porata Simham"	Krishna Kanth	Ravi G	3:18
5.	"Once Upon A Time"	Heisenberg	Anirudh Ravichander	2:23
Total length:				15:54

Extended Soundtrack
No.	Title	Lyrics	Singer(s)	Length
1.	"Porata Simham" (EDM Version)	Krishna Kanth	Anirudh Ravichander, Sri Krishna	2:29
Total length:				2:29

Malayalam
No.	Title	Lyrics	Singer(s)	Length
1.	"Mathu Padaikel"	Deepak Ram	Mano	1:59
2.	"Vikram" (Title Track)	Deepak Ram	Deepak Blue	3:02
3.	"Wasted"	Heisenberg	Anirudh Ravichander	3:03
4.	"Porkanda Singam"	Deepak Ram	Ravi G	2:02
5.	"Once Upon A Time"	Heisenberg	Anirudh Ravichander	2:24
Total length:				12:31

Hindi
No.	Title	Lyrics	Singer(s)	Length
1.	"Badle Badle"	Raqueeb Alam	Kamal Haasan	3:31
2.	"Badle Badle" (Rap Extended Version)	Raqueeb Alam, Raftaar	Kamal Haasan, Raftaar	4:15
3.	"Vikram" (Title Track)	Raqueeb Alam	Anirudh Ravichandran, Siddharth Mahadevan	3:39
4.	"Wasted"	Heisenberg	Anirudh Ravichander	3:03
5.	"Ek Sher Ho Tum"	Raqueeb Alam	Jubin Nautiyal	3:18
6.	"Once Upon A Time"	Heisenberg	Anirudh Ravichander	2:24
Total length:				20:06

== Background score ==
Vikram

Film score by Anirudh Ravichander
- Released: 7 July 2022
- Recorded: 2021–2022
- Studios: Albuquerque Records, Chennai; Krimson Avenue Studios, Chennai
- Genre: Film score
- Length: 34:16
- Language: Tamil
- Label: Sony Music
- Producer: Anirudh Ravichander
External audio
- Film Score on YouTube

In June 2022, Lokesh Kanagaraj insisted fans that the film's original soundtrack will be released into a separate album. The following month, Anirudh tweeted the mastering of the film score is under works, and will be released in few days. The score was released by Sony Music South on 7 July 2022.

No.	Title	Length
1.	"Amar Theme"	2:28
2.	"Sandhanam Theme"	1:46
3.	"Amar & Gayathri"	1:22
4.	"What's Cookin?"	1:19
5.	"Moaning Theme"	1:24
6.	"Marriage at 2AM"	1:27
7.	"Wedding Party"	1:36
8.	"Pablo Sandhanam"	0:45
9.	"Agent Vikram"	3:09
10.	"Ghost Unmasked"	1:14
11.	"The Dilli Connect"	1:21
12.	"The Vikram Squad"	1:34
13.	"Shield Fight"	1:37
14.	"Prabanjan Theme"	2:56
15.	"The Name is Vikram"	0:49
16.	"Agent Tina"	0:45
17.	"Sound of Vikram"	3:04
18.	"Vikram vs Sandhanam"	2:11
19.	"Lokiverse"	2:36
20.	"Rolex Theme"	0:53
Total length:		34:16

== Reception ==
Reviewing about the song "Pathala Pathala", Daily News and Analysis wrote that: "Kamal Haasan's vocals with music director Anirudh's composition have struck the cord straight into the heart of actor fans". It also praised Haasan's hookstep performed in the track, which adds "a massy feel to the song". Manoj Kumar R. of The Indian Express wrote "'Pathala Pathala' again shows Kamal's command over Madras’ slang, something which he had perfected during his collaboration with late iconic screenwriter Crazy Mohan. The song is riddled with expletives that are very native to the slang and packs some political commentary which we have come to associate more with Kamal since his debut in electoral politics."

The News Minute, stated Kamal Haasan's rendition of "Pathala Pathala" in the Madras slang, makes reminiscent of the actor's previous songs "Kandasamy Madasamy" from Pammal K. Sambandam (2002) and "Alwarpetta Aandava" from Vasool Raja MBBS (2004). Priyadarshni Bishnoi of Zoom had stated the track as "cheerful song with a comical undertone". Reviewing for the soundtrack, News18 wrote "Composer Anirudh steals the show". Srivatsan S of The Hindu stated "When there are no guns or deafening explosions, Anirudh's background score does the talking", while Haricharan Pudipeddi of Hindustan Times wrote that Anirudh's music and background score play a pivotal role "in amplifying the overall experience of watching Vikram on the big screen".

== Controversy ==
On 12 May 2022, a day after the single "Pathala Pathala" was released, a lawsuit was filed against the songwriter Haasan, by social activist named Selvan demanding to remove a particular line from the song referring to the government treasury. He objected to the use of the word "Ondriyam" (transl. Union), and pointed out the lyrics, which referred to them as "thieves" and depicted their management of COVID-19 and its funds in the exchequer in a negative light, concerning that the lyrics might instigate caste-related conflicts. He also claimed that a petition will be filed at the High court to stall the film's release if the objectionable lyrics were not removed. Haasan, explained about this argument, at the promotional event in Delhi, saying that "Ondriyam could be many things. One has to see the film to know why we have used this song here. It is because it suits the film. We are not EP, we are filmmakers, and I am a politician too so punning is something I like to do." Also in an interview with India Today, Haasan stated that:

"Every Union government should be [targeted], whatever party it belongs to. The state should look at it and comment, critique it. That's democracy. Any government, anybody, whichever party it is. I am centrist. So I will think like that and you must let that kind of thinking grow. That's a quality of leadership, to take criticism when it comes and check it out whether it's justifiable instead of just quashing or silencing it."
