= Valimai (soundtrack) =

2022 soundtrack album by Yuvan Shankar Raja

Soundtrack album by Yuvan Shankar Raja
- Released: 1 January 2022
- Recorded: 2020–2021
- Studio: U1 Records, Chennai; Panchathan Record Inn and AM Studios, Chennai; Unique Studios LLP, Chennai; New Edge Studios, Mumbai
- Genre: Feature film soundtrack
- Length: 15:41
- Language: Tamil
- Label: Sony Music India
- Producer: Yuvan Shankar Raja

Yuvan Shankar Raja chronology
Veeramae Vaagai Soodum (2021)	Valimai (2022)	Maamanithan (2022)

Singles from Valimai
- 1. "Naanga Vera Maari" Released: 2 August 2021; 2. "Mother Song" Released: 5 December 2021; 3. "Whistle Theme" Released: 22 December 2021

Valimai is the soundtrack album composed by Yuvan Shankar Raja for the 2022 Tamil-language action thriller film of the same name, directed by H. Vinoth. Produced by Boney Kapoor under Bayview Projects LLP and Zee Studios, starring Ajith Kumar. The soundtrack album featured five songs written by Vignesh Shivan, Thamarai and Arivu and released by Sony Music India on New Year's Day (1 January 2022).

== Development ==
Following the successive collaborations with Ajith Kumar after Dheena, Billa, Aegan, Mankatha, Billa II, Arrambam and Nerkonda Paarvai, Yuvan was assigned to compose songs for the film (earlier titled as Thala 60) after Vinoth's suggestion to Boney Kapoor, during the production of Nerkonda Paarvai. Initially, A. R. Rahman was rumoured to compose for the project after his meeting with Kapoor, but Rahman denied the speculations. Yuvan's inclusion was confirmed during the project launch in October 2019.

According to a report from The Times of India, the album of Valimai will have five songs including a theme music. Yuvan composed two tracks for the film during February 2020, where one of the tracks being filmed. But due to the COVID-19 lockdown restrictions, the progress of the film's music album was put on hold and also due to Ajith Kumar's request, not to begin post-production immediately in concern about the safety of the technical crew. In a press interaction with Vikatan, Yuvan further revealed that, he had completed three songs and the theme music; for the latter, he composed without the help of his signature guitar notes, as per Ajith's suggestion, so as to give something fresh and massy appeal. Recording for the tracks began in mid-December 2020 at composer A. R. Rahman's AM Studios in Chennai, with the studio's chief sound engineer S. Sivakumar worked on the film's audiography. The film's soundtrack has different set of songs, consisting of various genres.

Yuvan Shankar Raja had launched a website named on his label U1 Records in February 2021, and it revealed the details about the film's introductory song for Ajith Kumar (later deciphered the track as "Naanga Vera Maari"), with Vignesh Shivan writing the lyrics; touted to be a folk number, Yuvan also brought in folk drummers from Orissa to record the song. Discussing the song, Yuvan described it as a "mass song", which gained expectations around the song, after his work in the iconic theme music from Mankatha (2011). The opening song was reported to have two versions with a rough cut was recorded by Yuvan, along with Anurag Kulkarni, a prominent playback singer in Tollywood and Anirudh Ravichander was reported to give vocals for its dual version. The song was choreographed by Dinesh, featuring other junior artistes and was filmed at Ramoji Film City in Hyderabad during February 2020. For this song, Ajith handled the drone camera and shot few frames in the song as well as in the film.

Yuvan recorded two melody tracks for the album, with one written by Thamarai, after Ajith Kumar reportedly suggested tracks in melody genres. It is because, of the 2019 film Viswasam featured "Kannana Kanne", a melody song based on the father-daughter relationship, which won National Film Award for its composer D. Imman. The song is based on mother-son sentiment, and Yuvan had revealed that it will be dedicated to motherhood and mother's love for her kids. In July 2021, rapper-lyricist Arivu was reported to pen one of the songs for the film, and a still was released in September 2021, citing about the recording sessions of the track.

== Release ==
Actors Poonam Bajwa, Sakshi Agarwal, music director S. Thaman and director Venkat Prabhu (who occasionally collaborated with Yuvan) raised anticipations about the film's soundtrack. On 2 August 2021, collaborating with Ajith's 30th anniversary in the film industry, the makers released the first single "Naanga Vera Maari" on the same night. The song lyrics talk about how youngsters should be, when it comes to their attitude and behaviour. Within a span of 17 hours since its release, the lyrical video (released on Sony Music South) crossed 6 million views on YouTube. In August 2021, Yuvan tweeted that work on the second single is under progress and will be launched soon. On 1 December 2021, a promo teaser of the second single, titled "Mother Song" was released, and the full song will be unveiled on 5 December. The third single from the album – an instrumental track titled "Whistle Theme" was released on 22 December, and received praise from music critics and listeners. Boney Kapoor, called the theme track a "musical delight".

Though, H. Vinoth stated that the remaining tracks from the album will be released on the film's earlier scheduled release date (13 January 2022), the soundtrack eventually released on New Year's Day (1 January 2022). The album which released on Spotify, iTunes and YouTube Music had featured five tracks in the album including "Enna Kurai" and the theme track "The Intense of Fire". A day after its release, the tracks were removed from the respective platforms as the tracks revealed the plot of the film, but eventually restored a day before the film release.

== Track listing ==
Tamil
No.	Title	Lyrics	Singer(s)	Length
1.	"Naanga Vera Maari"	Vignesh Shivan	Yuvan Shankar Raja, Anurag Kulkarni	4:15
2.	"Mother Song (Version 1)"	Vignesh Shivan	Sid Sriram	4:06
3.	"Mother Song (Version 2)"	Vignesh Shivan	Pradeep Kumar	4:06
4.	"Enna Kurai" (Theme)	Thamarai	Sriram Parthasarathy, Nandini Srikar	3:11
5.	"The Intense of Fire"	Arivu	Arivu	2:39
6.	"Whistle Theme"	—	Instrumental	1:43
Total length:				19:49

Hindi
No.	Title	Lyrics	Singer(s)	Length
1.	"Dhana Dhani"	Sameer	Anurag Kulkarni	4:15
2.	"Mother Song"	Sameer	Shaan	4:06
3.	"Dekhi Lahu"	Sameer	Pavithra Chari, Sarath Santhosh	3:11
4.	"Whistle Theme (Instrumental)" (Theme)	—		1:43
Total length:				13:03

Telugu
No.	Title	Lyrics	Singer(s)	Length
1.	"Naadhi Vere Maata"	Bhuvana Chandra	Anurag Kulkarni	4:15
2.	"Mother Song"	Srinivasa Moorthy	Pradeep Kumar	4:06
3.	"Thalladilladha"	Rajashri Sudhakar	Pavithra Chari, Sarath Santhosh	3:11
4.	"Whistle Theme" (Theme)	—	Instrumental	1:43
Total length:				13:03

Kannada
No.	Title	Lyrics	Singer(s)	Length
1.	"Naave Eera Thara"	Manjunath Rao	Deepak Blue	4:15
2.	"Mother Song"	Manjunath Rao	Satya Prakash	4:06
3.	"Enno Kore Na"	Manjunath Rao	Priya Malli, Sarath Santhosh	3:11
4.	"Whistle Theme" (Theme)	—	Instrumental	1:43
Total length:				13:03

== Reception ==
Ramesh Kannan of Moviecrow stated that "Yuvan's score for one of the highly expected movies is largely a mixed bag from the composer and the soundtrack is salvaged by a couple of neatly done melodies" and gave 2.5 out of 5 to the album. Aishwarya Ragupati of Hindustan Times gave 4 out of 5 stating the album as "earthy and massy".
