= Jithin Raj (singer) =

Indian playback singer (born 1989)

- Born: April 29, 1989 (age 37); Malappuram, Kerala, India
- Genre: Playback singing
- Occupations: Singer, performer
- Years active: 2015–present

Jithin Raj is an Indian playback singer and live performer who works in the Tamil, Malayalam, Telugu and Kannada film industries. Known for his dynamic vocal range and emotional depth, he has collaborated with top composers including A. R. Rahman, Ilaiyaraaja, D. Imman, Sharreth, Vidyasagar, Ouseppachan, Yuvan Shankar Raja, M. Jayachandran, and Ajaneesh Loknath. His performance of the song "Periyone" from the film Aadujeevitham (The Goat Life) received a nomination at the Hollywood Music in Media Awards.

== Early life and background ==
Jithin was born in Malappuram, Kerala. He showed early interest in music and actively participated in school competitions and reality singing shows. His exposure through reality shows like Mazhavil Manorama's Indian Voice Season 2 helped him transition into playback singing. He completed his schooling from St. Paul’s EMHSS, Thenhipalam (Malappuram), and holds a B.Tech in Electronics and Communication from Kalasalingam University, Virudhunagar. He married Mrs. Poornasree Haridas in 2024, who is also a playback singer and an HR professional. He is currently based between Chennai and Kochi.

== Career ==
Jithin began his career in Tamil cinema and expanded into Malayalam, Telugu, and Kannada. He gained prominence with the songs "Pidikkudhae" from Sigaram Thodu (2015) and "Un Mele Oru Kannu" from Rajini Murugan (2016), both composed by D. Imman. Over the years, he has performed a wide range of songs across languages. His rendition of "Periyone" in Aadujeevitham (2024), composed by A. R. Rahman, earned him multiple accolades.

== Discography ==
=== Malayalam songs ===
Year	Song	Film	Composer
2015	"Mekkarayil"	Mariyam Mukku	Vidyasagar
2016	"Jayaho Janatha"	Janatha Garage	Devi Sri Prasad
2016	"Punnamada Kaayal"	Munthirivallikal Thalirkkumbol	M. Jayachandran
2016	"Onpathilaage"	Thoppil Joppan	Vidyasagar
2017	"O Sona"	Mom	A. R. Rahman
2018	"Iyya Ka Nau Badu"	Parole	Sharreth
2019	"Arodum Mindathe"	Queen of Neermathalam Pootha Kaalam	Nahoom Abraham
2019	"Chil Chilambumani"	Adukkalayil Paniyundu	Sangeethaa
2021	"Kattathoru Mankoodu"	Meri Awas Suno	M. Jayachandran
2024	"Periyone"	Aadujeevitham	A. R. Rahman
2024	"Family Man"	Marco	Ravi Basrur
2025	"Veyiluchayum Cheriviloode"	Ouseppinte Osiyathu	Sumesh Parameshwar
2024	"Manam Thakarkillivar"	Maidaan	A. R. Rahman

=== Tamil songs ===
Year	Song	Film	Composer
2015	"Pidikkudhae"	Sigaram Thodu	D. Imman
2015	"Sandamarudham"	Sandamarutham	James Vasanthan
2016	"Un Mele Oru Kannu"	Rajini Murugan	D. Imman
2016	"Karuvakaatu Karuvaaya"	Marudhu	D. Imman
2016	"Yedho Maayam Saeigirai"	Wagah	D. Imman
2016	"Hey Puthrajaya Poove"	Meen Kuzhambum Man Paanaiyum	D. Imman
2016	"Nila Nila"	Yaanum Theeyavan	Achu Rajamani
2016	"Laama Laama"	Mudinja Ivana Pudi	D. Imman
2016	"Virru Virru"	Rekka	D. Imman
2016	"Kannadikkala"	Maaveeran Kittu	D. Imman
2018	"Kelambu"	Golisoda 2	Achu Rajamani
2018	"Neeyum Naanum Anbe"	Imaikkaa Nodigal	Hiphop Tamizha
2018	"Mudhal Murai"	Irumbuthirai	Yuvan Shankar Raja
2018	"Angry Bird"	Irumbuthirai	Yuvan Shankar Raja
2021	"Enakku Nee Thandi"	Nayae Peyae	N. R. Raghunanthan
2021	"Unakkaga (Reprise)"	Nayae Peyae	N. R. Raghunanthan
2022	"Anbe Anbe"	Kranti	V. Harikrishna
2023	"Senthaamarai"	Kazhuvethi Moorkkan	D. Imman
2023	"Ava Kanna Paatha"	Kazhuvethi Moorkkan	D. Imman
2023	"Thai Piranthal Indru"	Vattara Vazhakku	D. Imman
2024	"Raja Payan Onnu"	Maharaja	B. Ajaneesh Loknath

=== Telugu songs ===
Year	Song	Film	Composer
2016	"Andham Thannullona"	Jakkanna	Dinesh
2017	"Oye Mera Krishuuu"	Radha	Radhan
2018	"Tholi Tholiga Tholakari"	Abhimanyudu	Yuvan Shankar Raja
2018	"Soundarya Lahari"	Saakshyam	Harshavardhan Rameshwar
2019	"Nuvvu Nenu Cheri"	Anjali C.B.I.	C. Sathya
2021	"Entha Entha Choosina"	Gamanam	Ilaiyaraaja

=== Kannada songs ===
Year	Song	Film	Composer
2016	"Hunna Hunna"	Kotigobba 2	D. Imman
2018	"Tajaa Samachara"	Natasaarvabhowma	D. Imman
2018	"Natasaarvabhowma (Title Track)"	Natasaarvabhowma	D. Imman
2024	"Belake Nee"	Aadujeevitham (Kannada version)	A. R. Rahman

=== Hindi songs ===
Year	Song	Film	Composer
2024	"Meharbaan Oh Rahmaan"	Aadujeevitham (Goat Life)	A. R. Rahman

== Awards ==
Year	Award	Category	Work
2016	Mirchi Music Awards (South)	Best Upcoming Male Playback Singer	Debut Tamil songs – including "Un Mele Oru Kannu"
2024	Mazhavil Music Awards	Best Playback Singer – Male	"Periyone"
2024	Hollywood Music in Media Awards	Nomination: Best Song in a Feature Film	"Periyone"
