= Thiruchitrambalam (soundtrack) =

2022 soundtrack album by Anirudh Ravichandran

- Soundtrack album cover

Soundtrack album by Anirudh Ravichander
- Released: 16 July 2022
- Recorded: 2022
- Studios: Albuquerque Records, Chennai; Krimson Avenue Studios, Chennai; Vanaj Kesav Digi Audio Waves, Chennai
- Genre: Feature film soundtrack
- Length: 18:23
- Language: Tamil
- Label: Sun Pictures
- Producer: Anirudh Ravichander

Anirudh Ravichander chronology
Vikram (2022)	Thiruchitrambalam (2022)	Jailer (2023)

Singles from Thiruchitrambalam
- 1. "Thaai Kelavi" Released: 24 June 2022; 2. "Megham Karukkatha" Released: 6 July 2022; 3. "Life of Pazham" Released: 13 July 2022; 4. "Thenmozhi" Released: 16 July 2022; 5. "Mayakkama Kalakkama" Released: 26 August 2022; 6. "Kanneer Sindha" Released: 9 September 2022

Thiruchitrambalam is the soundtrack album to the 2022 film of the same name directed by Mithran R. Jawahar and produced by Sun Pictures. Starring Dhanush, Nithya Menen, Raashii Khanna, Priya Bhavani Shankar, Bharathiraja and Prakash Raj, the film's musical score is composed by Anirudh Ravichander, and featured five songs, with four of them were released as singles prior to the album and film release, and the fifth track was later unveiled as a bonus song from the film. One of the songs in the film were written by Vivek, while Dhanush wrote the remainder of it and also sung for three tracks. Anirudh and composer Santhosh Narayanan recorded one song each for the album.

== Background ==
The musical score is composed by Anirudh Ravichander, in his fifth collaboration with Dhanush after the former's debut film 3 (2012), Velaiilla Pattadhari (2014), Maari and Thanga Magan (2015), and also his reunion with Dhanush after seven years, since their last film Thanga Magan. It is also Anirudh's first collaboration with Jawahar. Anirudh's inclusion was confirmed by Sun Pictures in October 2020, when the film was in pre-production and under the working title D44 (Dhanush's 44th film as an actor in leading role).

The soundtrack to Thiruchitrambalam featured four songs, with all of them were released as singles. "Thaai Kelavi", the first single from the album sung and written by Dhanush, was released on 24 June 2022. It was followed by "Megham Karukkatha" also sung by Dhanush, released on 6 July, and "Life of Pazham" released on 13 July, sung by Anirudh Ravichander and lyrics written by Vivek. The final track from the film, "Thenmozhi", sung by Santhosh Narayanan, was released on 16 July, at the film's audio launch event happened at Jeppiaar Engineering College, Chennai. Dhanush and Anirudh also performed the songs at the launch event, attended by the film's cast and crew and other celebrities.

While the album had only four songs, a fifth song from the film, "Mayakkama Kalakkama" sung by Dhanush was released on 26 August 2022, as a bonus track from the album. The song was featured in the film, as a reprised version of "Thenmozhi". This song was used instead of the original version, as the former was conceived as a love failure song, but the track does not suit well with the film's storyline, hence, the track "Mayakkama Kalakkama" was written. The song portrays on Dhanush's struggles with the relationship.

== Track listing ==
No.	Title	Lyrics	Singer(s)	Length
1.	"Thaai Kelavi"	Dhanush	Dhanush	4:19
2.	"Megham Karukkatha"	Dhanush	Dhanush	4:52
3.	"Life of Pazham"	Vivek	Anirudh Ravichander	3:55
4.	"Thenmozhi"	Dhanush	Santhosh Narayanan	2:54
5.	"Mayakkama Kalakkama"	Dhanush	Dhanush	2:23
6.	"Kanneer Sindha"	Dhanush	Vijay Yesudas	3:40
Total length:				18:23

== Background score ==
Thiruchitrambalam

Film score by Anirudh Ravichander
- Released: 26 September 2022
- Recorded: 2021–2022
- Studios: Albuquerque Records, Chennai; Knack Studios, Chennai
- Genre: Film score
- Language: Tamil
- Label: Sun TV
- Producer: Anirudh Ravichander
External audio
- Film Score on YouTube

The original soundtrack was released by Sun Pictures on 26 September 2022.

No.	Title	Length
1.	"Pazham and Anusha"	0:43
2.	"Thiruchitrambalam" (Title Theme)	1:03
3.	"Text Message"	2:04
4.	"Coffee Shop"	1:11
5.	"Anusha Rejects Pazham"	1:38
6.	"Senior Pazham"	0:38
7.	"Shobana Insulted"	0:51
8.	"Mothers Death"	3:05
9.	"Fathers Stroke"	1:36
10.	"Thiru Helps his Dad"	1:20
11.	"Dysfunctional Home"	1:09
12.	"Pazham and Ranjini"	1:21
13.	"Pazham Proposes to Shobana"	0:30
14.	"What is Love"	0:57
15.	"Shobana Leaves"	1:00
16.	"Pazham and Shobana Separated"	2:25
17.	"Pazham Rejected"	0:33
18.	"Pazham Realises her Love"	2:57
19.	"Thaangaadha Baaram"	1:34
20.	"Soulmates Unite"	1:29

== Reception ==
The album and musical score received more positive response, akin to the film. Firstpost-based critic Priyanka Sundar wrote "This also marks Dhanush and Anirudh's comeback collaboration, but to be honest, the highlight musical moments in the film belonged to Ilaiyaraaja. Thiruchitrambalam (Dhanush) is a fan of the maestro and every important moment in his life — sad or happy — is accentuated by the maestro's music. Anirudh has captured the attention of audiences with Thaikelavi and Megham Karukkadha, but the background score does seem stale. In fact, many instances take us back to Thangamagan."

Reviewing Anirudh's score, Sowmya Rajendran of The News Minute wrote "Anirudh's background score complements the subtle, unheroic tone of the film. The music director has made a name for himself for the adrenaline pumping scores of star vehicles, but in this film he shows that he can be restrained and mellow when needed." She further praised the picturisation of the song "Megham Karukatha" further stating that it "brings back memories of "Vennilave Vennilave" from Minsara Kanavu". S. Srivatsan of The Hindu opined that the score "follows the structure of Velaiilla Pattadhari".

== Controversy ==
A social activist lodged a complaint against the filmmakers asking them to change the lyrics of the song "Thaai Kelavi", as the lyrics of the song were claimed to be disrespectful to elders.
