= Pathala Pathala =

- Official song cover

Single by Kamal Haasan

from the album Vikram
- Language: Tamil
- Released: 11 May 2022
- Recorded: 2022
- Studio: Albuquerque Records, Chennai; Panchathan Record Inn and AM Studios, Chennai; Krimson Avenue Studios, Chennai
- Length: 3:33 (lyrical version); 2:49 (video version)
- Label: Sony Music India
- Composer: Anirudh
- Lyricist: Kamal Haasan

Vikram track listing
- 1. "Pathala Pathala"; 2. "Vikram Title Track"; 3. "Wasted"; 4. "Porkanda Singam"; 5. "Once Upon A Time"

"Pathala Pathala" is an Indian Tamil-language song composed by Anirudh, written and sung by Kamal Haasan, for the soundtrack of the 2022 film Vikram. The song lyrical version was released on 11 May 2022 through the record label Sony Music India, while the full video song was released on 1 July 2022.

The song was also released in Telugu as "Mathuga Mathuga", with lyrics written by Chandrabose and in Hindi as "Badle Badle" with lyrics written by Raqueeb Alam which features an extended demo with rap verses performed by Raftaar and Haasan too sang himself for the dubbed versions also. Haasan revealed the song as "one of his favourites from the album".

== Composition ==
Both Anirudh and Kamal have collaborated for Indian 2, the film was released in July 2024. As a result, this marks the second collaboration of Anirudh with Kamal, and also marks his second collaboration with Lokesh Kanagaraj after Master. Kamal himself wrote the lyrics after previously doing the same for so many of the songs like "Raja Kaiya Vacha" and "Sandhu Pottu".

According to reports, it is a kuthu number, also featuring lines about politics and social issues. The lyrics of the song are in Madras Tamil slang. The song was recorded during May 2022 at Anirudh's Albuquerque Records studio in Chennai.

== Music video ==
The song features Haasan dancing for the song. The song was choreographed by Sandy, and was shot at the outskirts of a railway station in Chennai.

== Records ==
"Pathala Pathala" received several million views with 770K+ likes and was the most viewed song on YouTube and has also been trending on the top.

== Release and reception ==
The lyrical version was released on 11 May 2022 and opened to a rousing response from audiences. The full video song was released on 1 July 2022.

Reviewing about the song Daily News and Analysis wrote that: "Kamal Haasan's vocals with music director Anirudh's composition have struck the cord straight into the heart of actor fans". It also praised Haasan's hook step performed in the track, which adds "a massy feel to the song". Manoj Kumar R. of The Indian Express wrote "'Pathala Pathala' again shows Kamal’s command over Madras’ slang, something which he had perfected during his collaboration with late iconic screenwriter Crazy Mohan. The song is riddled with expletives that are very native to the slang and packs some political commentary which we have come to associate more with Kamal since his debut in electoral politics."

The News Minute, stated Kamal Haasan's rendition of "Pathala Pathala" in the Madras slang, makes reminiscent of the actor's previous songs "Kandasamy Madasamy" from Pammal K. Sambandam (2002) and "Alwarpetta Aandava" from Vasool Raja MBBS (2004). Siddharth Srinivas of OnlyKollywood reviewed it as "a stylish album, packed with energetic tracks that would be a feast on screen". He further picked "Pathala Pathala", "Porkanda Singam" and the film's title track as his favourite picks and gave a three-and-a-half rating to the album.

== Controversy ==
A day after the first single "Pathala Pathala" was released, on 12 May 2022, a police complaint was filed against the track and its singer-lyricist Kamal Haasan, by social activist named Selvan, claiming that the song mocks the Central government, by referring them as "thieves" and depicts their management of COVID-19 and its funds in the exchequer in a negative light, concerning that the lyrics might instigate caste-related conflicts. He also claimed that, a petition will be filed at the High court to stall the film's release, if the objectionable lyrics were not removed. In an interview with India Today, Kamal Haasan stated that:

"Every Union government should be [targeted], whatever party it belongs to. The state should look at it and comment, critique it. That's democracy. Any government, anybody, whichever party it is. I am centrist. So I will think like that and you must let that kind of thinking grow. That's a quality of leadership, to take criticism when it comes and check it out whether it's justifiable instead of just quashing or silencing it."

== Track listing ==
The track "Pathala Pathala" was released as "Mathuga Mathuga" in Telugu (lyrics written by Chandrabose), and in Hindi as "Badle Badle" (lyrics written by Raqueeb Alam).

Digital download

1. "Pathala Pathala" (Tamil) - 3:33
2. "Mathuga Mathuga" (Telugu) - 3:33
3. "Mathu Padaikel" (Malayalam) - 1:59
4. "Mathile Mathile" (Kannada) - 1:59
5. "Badle Badle (Rap Extended Version)" (Hindi) - 4:20
