= ISRO espionage case =

Disproven allegation of espionage

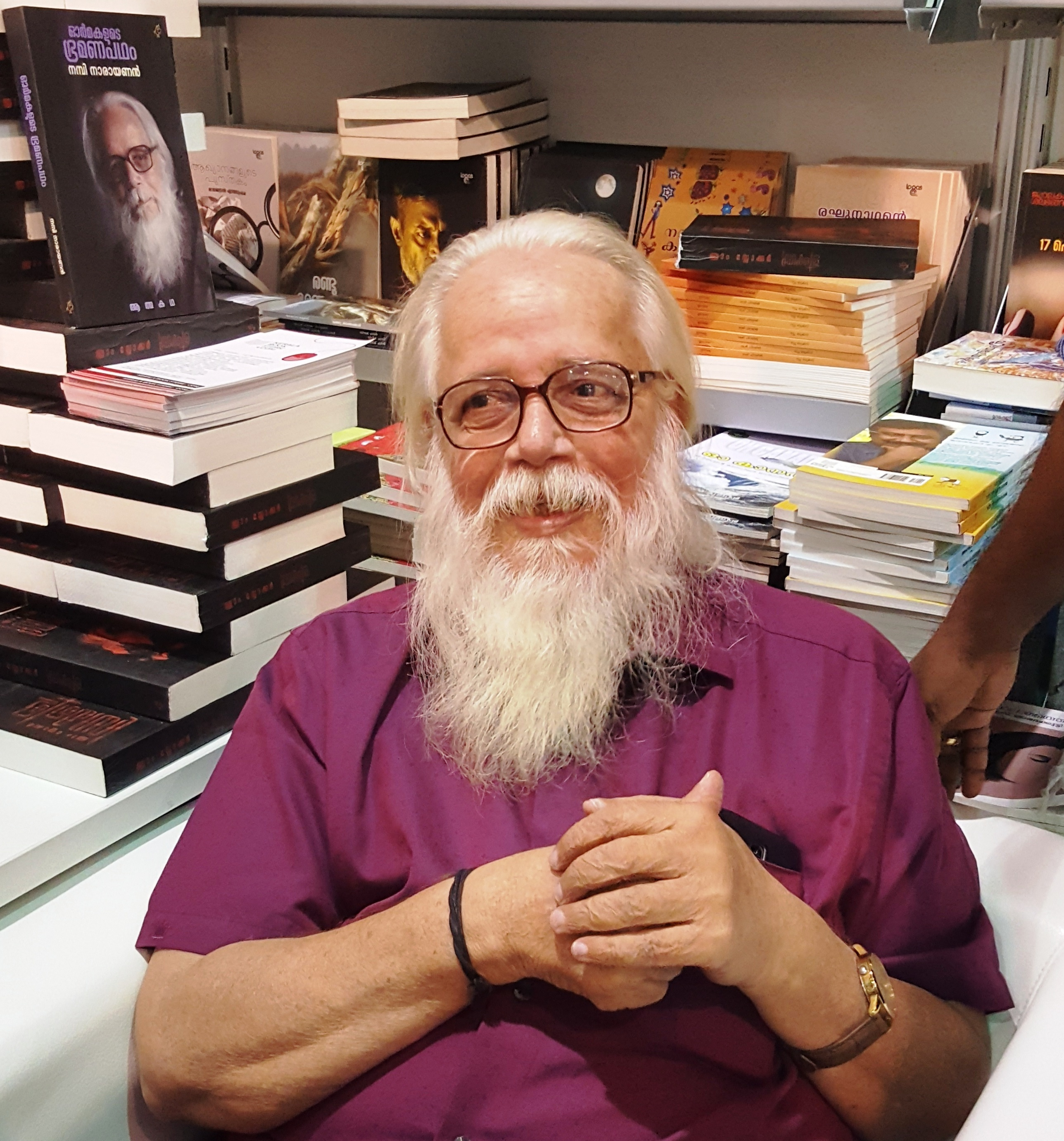
Nambi Narayanan, former ISRO scientist falsely accused in the espionage case

ISRO espionage case involved discredited allegations of espionage made by Indian investigation agencies in the 1990s against some scientists of the Indian Space Research Organisation (ISRO). Indian intelligence agencies and the Kerala police arrested some senior aerospace engineers on charges of attempting to sell confidential documents containing designs of indigenous rocket engine developed by ISRO.

The most prominent victim was aerospace engineer Nambi Narayanan, who later alleged that the United States and CIA may have involved in fabricating the case, thereby preventing India from entering into multi-billion dollar commercial space missions. Indian National Congress (INC) politicians A. K. Antony and Oommen Chandy led 'A'-group caucus inside the INC in Kerala. Senior Kerala Police officials like Raman Srivastava, Siby Mathews and the Malayalam newspaper Malayala Manorama played a major role in sensationalising and politicising the allegations made against the scientists.

In April 1996, the Central Bureau of Investigation concluded that there was no case to be made and the Supreme Court of India stopped the Kerala government from pursuing further investigation. The political fallout from the case caused K. Karunakaran to resign as chief minister of Kerala in March 1995. The ISRO employees, who had been subject to arrest, pursued redress in courts, with Nambi Narayanan being awarded around 19 lakh in total as compensation. In 2021, the Supreme Court ordered a probe into the actions of involved police officers, who filed counter-suits alleging corruption on the part of CBI investigators. Siby Mathews IPS was the fourth accused in the espionage fabrication case and accused of ordering the alleged torture of Nambi Narayanan. He is fighting a case in the Supreme Court against a CBI plea to cancel Mathews's anticipatory bail in the fake case.

== Arrests ==
In October 1994, during a visa verification check at Thiruvananthapuram, police found the explanations of two Maldivian women, Mariam Rasheeda and Fauziyya Hassan, suspicious. A diary written in Dhivehi language was found in a raid on Rasheeda's lodging. Police said that it indicated she was a member of the National Security Service of Maldives. A first information report filed by police mentioned instances of Rasheeda contacting D Sasikumaran, then a general manager at Liquid Propulsion Systems Centre. (Note: Phone records showed calls by Rasheeda to Vikram Sarabhai Space Centre and the residence of Sasikumaran. Police also said that Sasikumaran visited Rasheeda's hotel.) A report that Rasheeda and Fauziyya Hassan were frequent visitors to the Pakistani embassy in Maldives spurred an investigation by Intelligence Bureau (IB) and Research and Analysis Wing (R&AW) officials. The two women were arrested for overstaying their visa as well as under the Official Secrets Act. Based on their interrogation, which was recorded on video, Sasikumaran and K Chandrasekhar, a representative of Glavkosmos, were arrested in November. In the interrogation, it was alleged that Narayanan and Sasikumaran were to collect documents; Chandrasekhar would arrange logistics and payments; and would transfer the documents to Alexi Vassive of Ural Aviation, who would forward it to Glavkosmos. Sasikumaran claimed that Narayanan and Vassive had already brokered a transfer of drawings of Viking engine to Brazil in 1989–90. A Pakistani scientist and a woman working with Pakistani High Commission in Colombo were also named.

Between 21 November and 1 December 1994, four people associated with the ISRO; D. Sasikumaran, K. Chandrasekhar, Nambi Narayanan and Sudhir Kumar Sharma were arrested by the Crime Branch of the Kerala Police; Narayanan had submitted a request for voluntary retirement from ISRO a month prior to his arrest. The Kerala Police special team headed by then DIG Siby Mathews had arrested Narayanan on charges of espionage. Police recorded that confidential documents from LPSC were recovered from Sasikumaran's house the next day. The police alleged that $50,000 was given to Sasikumaran and Narayanan through Hassan's daughter between January and September 1994. Chandrasekhar mentioned the name of Ravindra Reddy as being involved in business with Russians. Reddy was alleged to be a business partner of Prabhakar Rao, son of the then prime minister Narasimha Rao. Because of the international aspects of the case, Siby Mathews, who was heading the police team, requested the Central Bureau of Investigation (CBI) to take up the case, and the CBI did so on 4 December. At the time, CBI was also investigating other cases related to the Rao family, such as the Jain hawala case.

== CBI investigation ==
Narayanan spent 50 days in jail. He claimed that officials from the Intelligence Bureau, who initially interrogated him, wanted him to make false accusations against the top brass of ISRO. He alleged that two IB officials had asked him to implicate A. E. Muthunayagam, his boss and then Director of the Liquid Propulsion Systems Centre (LPSC). He said that when he refused to comply, he was tortured until he collapsed and was hospitalised. He said his main complaint against ISRO is that it did not support him. K. Kasturirangan, who was ISRO chairman at the time, stated that ISRO could not interfere in a legal matter. He wrote that the director of CBI Vijaya Rama Rao met him in jail on 8 December (four days after the case was transferred), when he explained to the director that the drawings of rockets and engines was not classified. He wrote that the CBI director wondered how the case has gotten so far and apologized in that meeting.

A (fake) petition filed in Kerala High Court for the arrest of Srivastava was dismissed by the court on the grounds that the court did not have powers to direct inclusion of persons in cases without any evidence. But the court had examined three tapes of the interrogation and dismissed allegations of torture by IB that the suspects had made to CBI investigators. The judges also found fault with CBI's failure to investigate leads suggested by Kerala police as well as its heavy dependence on the retractions by the accused. The court order precipitated Srivastava's suspension. K. Karunakaran, who was criticized both by other Congressional factions and the opposition for seemingly shielding Srivastava, resigned as chief minister and A. K. Antony assumed the post. This factional struggle within the Congress in Kerala and within the Kerala Police ensured that Nambi Narayanan was not able to obtain justice for a long time. Some of the critical comments by the High Court were later removed by the Supreme Court, when it adjudicated a special leave petition by the CBI.

In April 1996, before the 1996 Indian general election, CBI submitted a closure report to the chief judicial magistrate of Ernakulam district, saying that there was no espionage and that the testimonies of suspects were coerced by torture. In May 1996, Kerala elected a new LDF government. Amid attention on lacunae in CBI closure report, a challenge of the report in Kerala High Court by S. Vijayan (Note: A police officer involved in the initial investigation) and continuing pressure from his own party, the new chief minister E. K. Nayanar revoked the permission granted previously to CBI to investigate the case and enjoined Kerala police to take it up again. But Supreme Court (Note: Bench consisting of judges M.K. Mukherji and Syed Shah Mohammed Quadri) stopped it in April 1998, pointing out that the Indian Official Secrets Act limits the powers of state police to conduct further investigation. It said that "the CBI found that no case had been made out" and ordered the Kerala government to pay Rs 100,000 each to the six accused. (Note: Rasheeda, Hassan, Narayanan, Sasikumaran, Chandrasekhar and S.K. Sharma, a labour contractor for ISRO) In September 1999, the National Human Rights Commission (NHRC) passed strictures against the government of Kerala for having damaged Narayanan's distinguished career in space research along with the physical and mental torture to which he and his family were subjected. After the dismissal of charges against them, the two scientists, Sasikumar and Narayanan were transferred out of Thiruvananthapuram and were given desk jobs.

== CIA Involvement ==
Narayanan agrees on the role of the Central Intelligence Agency (CIA). The CIA, according to him, wanted to make sure that India did not get cryogenic rocket technology from Russia. The US administration feared it would capacitate ISRO to launch satellites into the geostationary orbit and seize a sizeable portion of the global space market. Thus, the CIA is claimed to have acted “in connivance with investigators” to impede India’s cryogenic engine programme after the United States blocked a technology transfer from Russia in 1993. Former ISRO scientist Nambi Narayanan has publicly requested further inquiry into U.S. involvement. Allegations also mention Ratan Sehgal, an Intelligence Bureau officer, and purported CIA operatives named Timothy Long and Susan Brown, though no official records confirm their roles or the extent of covert activities in India. Following a 2021 Supreme Court directive for a CBI reinvestigation, Narayanan welcomed the probe, stating that the conspirators should be identified and exposed. Additionally, the 1997 India Today report on the Ratan Sehgal episode highlighted the strain between India and the U.S., which some reports and media sources interpret as part of broader intelligence-related tensions.

== Redressal suits ==
In 2001, the NHRC ordered the government of Kerala to pay Nambi Narayanan a compensation of ₹ 10 lakh. He retired in 2001. The Kerala High Court ordered a compensation amount of Rs 1 lakh to be paid to Narayanan based on an appeal from NHRC India in September 2012.

On 3 October 2012, The Hindu reported that the government of Kerala had dropped charges against the police officials who were alleged to have falsely implicated Narayanan in the espionage case on the grounds that over 15 years had passed since the case was initiated. The top officer involved in the case, Siby Mathews, was later appointed Chief Information Commissioner in Kerala (2011–2016).

== Later political implications ==
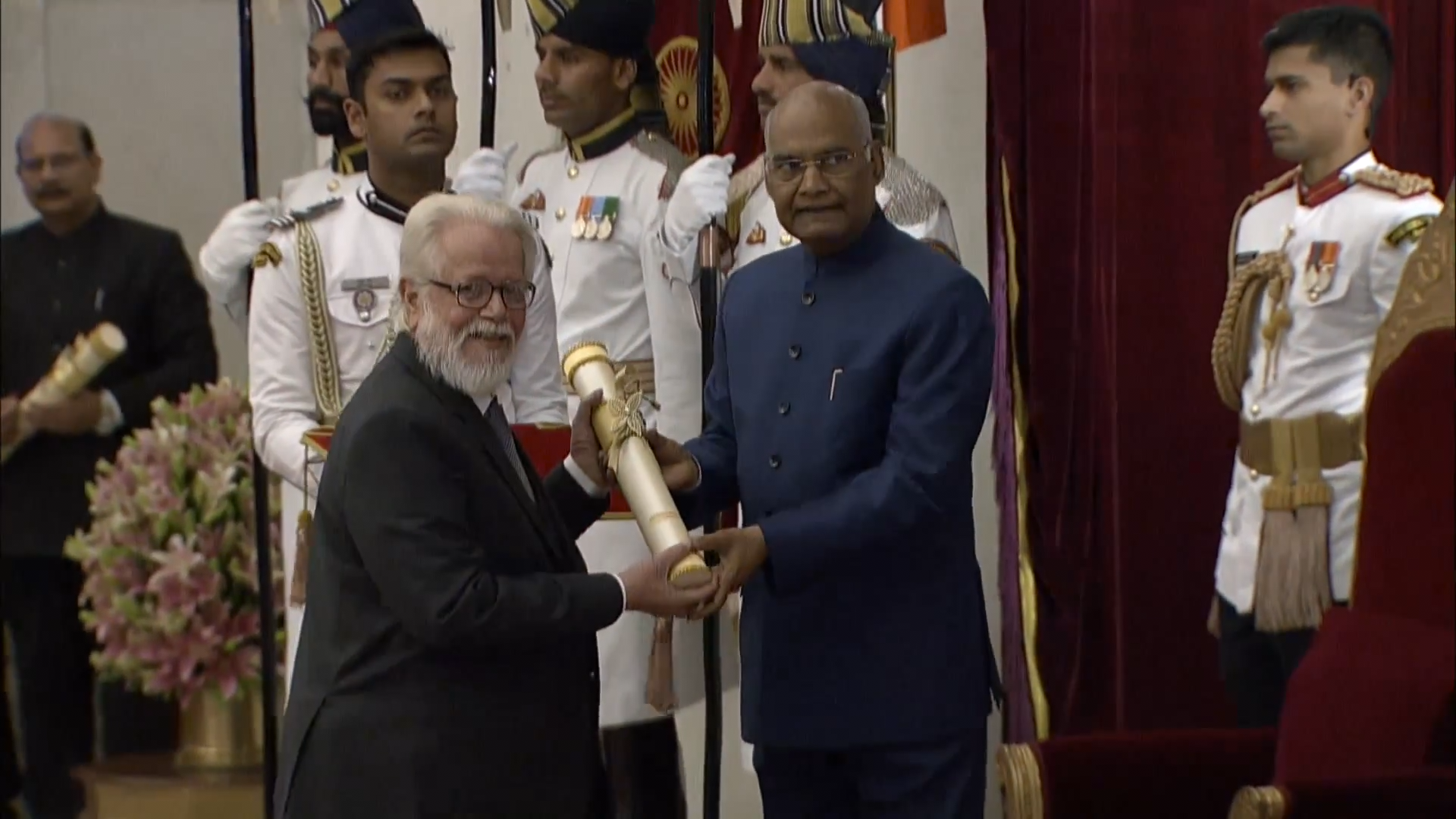
Nambi Narayanan receiving the Padma Bhushan in 2019

In September 2013, during his prime ministerial election campaign, Narendra Modi met with Narayanan in Thiruvananthapuram. R. B. Sreekumar, who had served as Additional Director-General of Police in Gujarat in 2002, had by then, made allegations of complicity by Modi and his government in the 2002 Gujarat riots. In November 2013, during the campaign for 2014 Indian general election, BJP aired claims that Sreekumar's allegations were in exchange for the United Progressive Alliance government dropping charges of faulty investigation in the ISRO espionage case.

On 14 September 2018, the Supreme Court ordered a probe (Note: by a three member panel headed by D. K. Jain, a former judge) into the "harrowing" arrest and alleged torture of former space scientist Nambi Narayanan in the 'ISRO spy scandal' that turned out to be fake. A three-judge bench led by Chief Justice Dipak Misra also awarded Narayanan Rs. 5 lakh in compensation for the "mental cruelty" he suffered all these years. The same month, Narayanan's name was recommended for Padma awards by Rajeev Chandrasekhar, then a BJP member of parliament. In January 2019, Modi said that "it was an honour for his government to confer the Padma Bhushan on Nambi Narayanan". The case and the Padma award featured in BJP's campaign for 2019 Indian general election, with Modi stating at a rally in Thiruvananthapuram, "I hope you are aware what the Congress has done to Kerala's own scientist Nambi Narayan" in a rally in.

== Recent developments ==
In 2021, Kerala government settled the case filed against it by Narayanan by agreeing to a payment of ₹13 million (US$130,000).

On 14 April 2021, the Supreme Court of India ordered a CBI probe into the involvement of police officers in the conspiracy. The Kerala High Court dismissed one of the pleas to investigate the land deals. It said that the documents were not proof enough, but allowed the petitioners to file a fresh case with better sale records.

== In popular culture ==
- Pathram (1999) is a Malayalam political thriller written by Renji Panicker and directed by Joshiy, featuring Suresh Gopi and Manju Warrier. The film contains an indirect thematic reference to the ISRO spy scandal.
- Rocketry: The Nambi Effect (2022) is another films which portrays the events regarding this case faced by Nambi Narayanan, the accused in the espionage case.

== See also ==
- CIA activities in India
