= Rocketry: The Nambi Effect =

2022 film directed by R. Madhavan

- Theatrical release poster
- Directed by: R. Madhavan
- Written by: R. Madhavan
- Produced by: Sarita Birje Madhavan; R. Madhavan; Varghese Moolan; Vijay Moolan
- Starring: R. Madhavan; Simran
- Cinematography: Sirsha Ray
- Edited by: Bijith Bala
- Music by: Songs: Sam C. S. Billy Dawson; Nate Cornell; Diwakar Subramaniam; Background Score: Sam C. S.
- Production companies: Tricolour Films; Varghese Moolan Pictures; 27th Entertainment
- Distributed by: UFO Moviez; Red Giant Movies; Yash Raj Films; Phars Film Co. LLC
- Release dates: 19 May 2022 (Cannes); 1 July 2022 (India)
- Running time: 157 minutes
- Country: India
- Languages: Tamil; Hindi; English
- Budget: ₹25 crore

Rocketry: The Nambi Effect is a 2022 Indian biographical drama film written, produced, and directed by R. Madhavan in his directorial debut. The film is based on the life of Nambi Narayanan, played by Madhavan, a scientist at the Indian Space Research Organisation, who was accused in an espionage case and later exonerated. The story spans across Narayanan's days as a graduate student at Princeton University, before exploring his work as a scientist and the false espionage charges placed upon him. Simran plays the female lead.

After its official announcement in October 2018, principal photography took place across several countries, including India, Russia, and France. The cinematography and editing were handled by Sirsha Ray and Bijith Bala, respectively, while the original score was composed by Sam C. S. Rocketry was filmed simultaneously in Tamil, Hindi, and English.

The English version of Rocketry premiered at the 2022 Cannes Film Festival on 19 May and the Tamil and Hindi versions had their theatrical release worldwide on 1 July 2022. The film received critical acclaim from critics and audience, who praised Madhavan's performance, his screenplay and his noble intention to make the film. The film garnered recognition with several awards and honors, including winning the National Film Award for Best Feature Film.

== Plot ==
The narrative is framed through a contemporary televised interview where aerospace scientist Nambi Narayanan recounts his career, along with the espionage charges that led to severe physical and psychological trauma for him and his family. The story flashes back to his early days at the Thumba Equatorial Rocket Launching Station, where he saves teammate A. P. J. Abdul Kalam from a severe laboratory injury. In 1969, Nambi receives a government-funded fellowship to pursue a master's degree in chemical rocket propulsion at Princeton University.

Under the tutelage of Professor Luigi Crocco, Nambi completes his degree and turns down a highly lucrative career offer from NASA, choosing instead to return to India to advance the Indian Space Research Organisation (ISRO). Despite successfully securing millions of pounds worth of equipment from Scotland for free, Nambi's research stalls following the sudden death of his mentor, Vikram Sarabhai, which leaves ISRO with depleted government funding. To circumvent this, Nambi negotiates a deal with the French scientific community to assist them with their liquid-propellant engine in exchange for technological access.

Nambi and his fifty-two colleagues covertly learn French before traveling but feign ignorance of the language to observe the French engineers. Upon discovering a critical design flaw in the French engine, Nambi leverages his team's expertise to fix the issue in exchange for the restricted testing data. Returning to India, the team spends eight years developing a prototype based on this technology. During validation trials back at the French facility, the engine safely withstands extreme pressure levels, proving to be a massive success. Nambi names the prototype the "VIKAS" engine in honor of Sarabhai.

Nambi next focuses on cryogenic technology to make India a viable competitor in the global satellite market. Recognizing domestic limitations, he negotiates a deal with the USSR to import four cryogenic engines. As the Soviet Union begins to collapse, the United States attempts to block the transaction through geopolitical sanctions. However, Nambi and his team manage to expedite the transfer, successfully smuggling the engines out of Russia before American authorities can intervene.

In 1994, Nambi is abruptly arrested in India on manufactured charges of treason. He is detained at a guest house in Trivandrum, where local authorities severely beat and torture him to extract a false confession. Recognizing a hidden recording device, Nambi refuses to repeat the incriminating statements dictated by his interrogators. Media outlets falsely report that Nambi fell into a honeytrap orchestrated by a Maldivian woman named Mariam, leading him to sell space secrets to Pakistan.

Following Nambi's hospitalization from his injuries, Central Bureau of Investigation (CBI) official P. M. Nair takes over the case. Nair interrogates Mariam and her associate Fauziyya, who admit they have never met Nambi. They reveal that a local police official tortured and threatened them to falsely implicate the scientist. Nair concludes that the entire espionage scandal was a calculated conspiracy orchestrated by external parties to cripple India's advancing cryogenic missile program.

Though Nambi secures bail, he returns home to find his family deeply traumatized and socially ostracized; his wife, Meena, requires immediate psychiatric care. Determined to restore his family's honor, Nambi wages a protracted legal battle. Years later, the Supreme Court of India completely exonerates him. He returns to ISRO to contribute to the successful Mangalyaan mission and is subsequently awarded the Padma Bhushan in 2019. Back in the present, the emotional interviewer apologizes to Nambi on behalf of the entire nation, and the film ends with archival footage of Nambi receiving his civilian honor from the President of India, Ram Nath Kovind.

== Cast ==
- R. Madhavan as Nambi Narayanan
- Simran as Meena Narayanan, wife of Nambi Narayanan
- Ravi Raghavendra as Vikram Sarabhai (Tamil version)
- Rajit Kapur as Vikram Sarabhai (Hindi version)
- Muralidaran as Subbiah Arunan, Nambi's son-in-law and Geeta's husband
- Meesha Ghoshal as Geeta Narayanan, Nambi and Meena's daughter
- Shyam Renganathan as Shankar Narayanan, Nambi and Meena's son
- Karthik Kumar as P. M. Nair from the Central Bureau of Investigation
- Amaan as A. P. J. Abdul Kalam
- Dinesh Prabhakar as L. D. Gopal
- Mohan Raman as Udupi Ramachandra Rao
- Ron Donachie as Val Cleaver
- Phyllis Logan as Mrs Cleaver
- Vincent Riotta as Luigi Crocco
- Sriram Parthasarathy as Barry Amaldev
- Rajeev Ravindranathan as Param
- Sam Mohan as Unni
- Bhawsheel Sahni as Sartaj
- Jagan as a scientist
- Anurita Jha as Mariam Rasheeda
- Emma Gojkovic as Elizabeth
- Vladimir Vuckovic as Yuri
- Karina Matas Piper as Michelle
- Simran Mishrikoti as Fauziyya Hassan
- Ankith Madhav as Veer
- Suriya as himself (Tamil version; guest appearance)
- Shah Rukh Khan as himself (Hindi/English versions; guest appearance)

Additionally, Nambi Narayanan portrays himself for the last 15 minutes of the film.

== Production ==
=== Development ===
A film based on the espionage case of ISRO (Indian Space Research Organisation) scientist Nambi Narayanan was first announced to the media in September 2012 by director Anant Mahadevan. Journalist C. P. Surendran had proposed the idea for a potential film on Narayanan to Mahadevan during June 2012. The two then met Narayanan in person to discuss the idea and seek his permission, and he agreed to serve as a consultant for the project. Malayalam actor Mohanlal was cast in the role of Narayanan, while Resul Pookutty, Sreekar Prasad and L. Subramaniam were finalised as the sound designer, editor and music composer for the project. Titled The Witch Hunt, the film was to be made in the Hindi and Malayalam languages. The team were in talks with several production houses but the project eventually did not take off as planned. Mahadevan later narrated the idea of the film to actor R. Madhavan in the mid-2010s, who helped take the film forward.

Work on Rocketry: The Nambi Effect was first reported by Madhavan in the media during April 2017, when he announced that he was set to appear in a biopic featuring the "extraordinary story of an unsung hero", who was "neither an actor nor a sportsman". He called the project his "biggest film ever" and stated that he had worked silently on the script of the film for a period of two years after becoming intrigued by hearing the tale of Narayanan's false espionage charge. To develop the script and to provide a more factual account of the events, Madhavan regularly met with Narayanan, garnering his approval for the film and discussing the scientist's life experiences. As a result of their conversations, Madhavan chose to alter his original script to include portions from Narayanan's entire career and his services to the Indian space programme, rather than just matters related to the espionage case and his 1994 arrest. For the script, he also took inspiration from Narayanan's autobiography Ormakalude Bhramanapadham (2017) and Arun Ram's official biography of the scientist titled Ready To Fire: How India and I Survived the ISRO Spy Case (2018).

In October 2017, Madhavan confirmed that pre-production work for the film was underway and that he would portray Narayanan from the ages of 27 to 75, and that he was gaining weight to film the scenes featuring the older version of Narayanan first, after taking advice from Aamir Khan. Madhavan also announced that alongside his screenwriting and acting credits, he would also be one of the producers of the project. In regard to the making of the film, Madhavan stated that he hoped to differ in the script in comparison to other biographical films, and suggested that he would not call the film a "biopic" but an "incisive investigation into a brilliant mind and India's ambitious space technology". He also added that he felt that Madhavan was the "only Indian actor qualified to do this part" owing to his background as an electronic engineer with air-force training, and because he was "a thinking-actor who is also well-read". Madhavan was later announced as a joint director of the film.

=== Filming ===
Principal photography began on 4 January 2019 in Mumbai and was shot as a multilingual, with scenes simultaneously filmed in the Hindi and Tamil with scenes set outside India shot in English. A few days after the start of the shoot, Mahadevan left the project owing to prior commitments and Madhavan took over as the project's sole director. Film director and writer Prajesh Sen, who had previously co-written Ormakalude Bhramanapadham and worked on a documentary titled Nambi The Scientist, joined the project as a co-director. Sukhmani Sadana worked on the film as an additional screenplay and dialogues writer. Scenes featuring Madhavan as the aged Narayanan were filmed first, with the actor taking up to 14 hours to get into the look following extensive make-up. During the first schedule in India, Simran joined the film's cast to portray the wife of the lead character, while actors Shah Rukh Khan and Suriya agreed to make cameo appearances in the Hindi and Tamil versions respectively as themselves. Neither actor charged any fee for their participation in the film. Other actors who joined the cast during the production were Tamil actor Jagan to portray a scientist, Rajit Kapur to feature as Indian physicist Vikram Sarabhai in the Hindi version and Ravi Raghavendra as Vikram Sarabhai in the Tamil version.

In late January 2019, the team moved to film scenes in Georgia and Russia. The team completed the shoot five days prior to the schedule, despite shooting in unfavourable weather conditions. In April and May 2019, the team shot scenes in India, with Madhavan shaving his beard to play a younger version of the character. The team subsequently moved on to film the final schedule in France and Serbia. Production was completed in Serbia during June 2019, with Scottish actors Ron Donachie and Phyllis Logan also a part of the final schedule. The shoot of the film took 44 days to complete. Post-production began in July 2019, with music composer Sam C. S. completing the background score by mid-October 2019. In August 2020, Madhavan revealed that the film had reached the final stages of post-production work and that only fifteen days of work were remaining to complete final sound mixing, mastering and digital intermediate tasks.

== Marketing ==
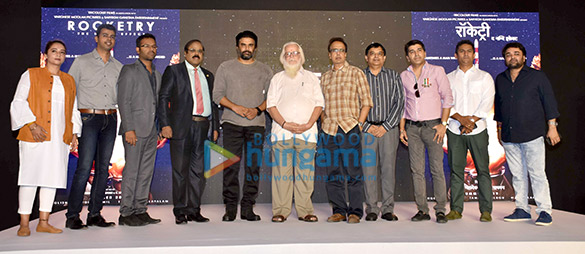
The makers and Narayan at the first look launch on 31 October 2018

Tricolour Films announced the title of the film Rocketry: The Nambi Effect and unveiled a minute-long teaser for the film on 31 October 2018 to mark the start of production. A launch event also coincided with the teaser release, with Nambi Narayanan himself in attendance. A theatrical trailer of the film was released online on 1 April 2021. To explain the trailer's release on April Fools' Day, Madhavan recalled a conversation that he had with Narayanan who asked him how many "fools" had been the victims of their own patriotism. Madhavan stated he hoped to dedicate the trailer to those "fools" who are "incredible unsung heroes who make this world a better place".

Manoj Kumar of The Indian Express and a reviewer from The News Minute both calling the trailer "riveting". Madhavan and Narayanan met with India's Prime Minister Narendra Modi to show him clips from the film. Modi later tweeted that the "film covers an important topic, which more people must know about" and praised the footage that he was shown. A number of film personalities including Amitabh Bachchan, Priyanka Chopra, Suriya, Hrithik Roshan and Samantha Ruth Prabhu also shared and praised the trailer.

The film premiered at the Marché du Film section of the 2022 Cannes Film Festival in France on 19 May 2022, with Madhavan and Narayanan both in attendance. The screening was also attended by India's Information and Broadcasting minister Anurag Thakur and music composer A. R. Rahman, among other film industry personalities and senior government officials.

The team then embarked on a 12-day tour across the United States, with preview screenings held at various centres including New York City, Chicago, Houston, Dallas, Arizona, Los Angeles, San Francisco and Seattle during early-June 2022. As a part of the film's promotional tour, the trailer was screened on the Nasdaq MarketSite billboard at Times Square in New York, while the team also met with the American astronaut of Indian origin, Sunita Williams, in Texas.

In mid-June 2022, Madhavan and the team returned to promote the film across India. A behind-the-scenes prologue for the film was released online, and then a promotional video showcasing the making of the film's music, along with the devotional track "Shri Venkatesa Suprabatham" was released at Sri Venkateswara Temple in Tirupati. Subsequent pre-release events were held at Kochi, New Delhi and Chennai to meet the press and hold launch events for the film. The team then moved to Dubai, United Arab Emirates to host another pre-release event at the City Centre Deira. In late June 2022, the team attended promotional events for the film in Indian cities such as Mumbai, Kolkata and Hyderabad. A further pre-release screening of the film was held at the Siri Fort auditorium in New Delhi with former director of the Central Bureau of Investigation D. R. Karthikeyan in attendance. A week after the release of the film on 1 July, Madhavan travelled to Kuala Lumpur in Malaysia to attend a special screening and promote the film.

Vistas Media Capital's metaverse, VistaVerse, launched collectable NFTs related to the film in late June 2022. It became the first Indian film to reach 10,000 NFTs claimed.

== Release ==
=== Theatrical ===
In September 2021, following the announcement of theatres reopening in Maharashtra after COVID-related closures, Madhavan initially announced that the film would be theatrically released on 1 April 2022 in the six languages (Hindi, Tamil, English, Malayalam, Telugu, Kannada). However, the release date was postponed and the English version did not have a theatrical release. Finally, the film was released theatrically worldwide on 1 July 2022.

The film was distributed worldwide by Yash Raj Films and Phars Film Co. LLC, with UFO Moviez additionally acquiring the film's distribution rights in North India. The film's Tamil version was distributed by Udhayanidhi Stalin's Red Giant Movies in Tamil Nadu, and AGS Cinemas joining as the official multiplex partner.

=== Home media ===
The Tamil version of Rocketry film began streaming on Amazon Prime Video from 26 July 2022. The Hindi version began streaming on Voot Select from 29 July.

== Reception ==
=== Box office ===
On the first day of its release, the film collected over ₹65 lakhs at the domestic box office. On the second day of its release, the film grossed ₹2 crores. After three days of its theatrical release, the film collected around ₹8 crore.

=== Critical response ===
Rocketry received positive reviews from critics. On the review aggregator website Rotten Tomatoes, 64% of 14 critics' reviews are positive, with an average rating of 6.2/10.

Devesh Sharma of Filmfare rated the film 4 out of 5 stars and wrote, "Madhavan carries the film on his shoulders. We can see that he totally believes in Nambi"s innocence and is hoping that the film will finally exonerate him in the eyes of the public. He lives and breathes the character, getting the nuances right. It's not easy being both the lead actor and the director but Madhavan achieves the desired trajectory on both fronts." Ronak Kotecha of Times Of India gave the film 3.5 out of 5 stars and said, "It has an interesting subject and an untold story of a man, who was wronged for always being right for his nation. ‘Rocketry’ takes off well, hits some turbulence on the way, but eventually soars high with real characters and moving moments that make it worth your while." Sanchita Jhunjhunwala of Zoom TV rated the film 3.5 out of 5 stars and wrote, "With a roller coaster of a ride on the screen depicting the one Nambi had in real life, we feel that the movie has great potential and would keep you hooked as you watch more of it. The emotional connect is what also draws you towards the story, courtesy the performances its ability to be as real as it gets, making it a great human drama."

A critic for Bollywood Hungama rated the film 3 out of 5 stars and wrote, "The Nambi Effect tells a shocking story of an ISRO genius and is embellished with an award-winning performance by R Madhavan." Pratikshya Mishra of The Quint rated the film 3 out of 5 stars and wrote, "Rocketry is a well-intentioned film and works purely because of the heroic and inspirational protagonist at its helm." Nandini Ramnath of Scroll.in rated the film 2.5 out of 5 stars and wrote, "Before it launches into its main argument, Rocketry lurches from one amateurish eureka moment to the next." Saibal Chatterjee of NDTV rated the film 2.5 out of 5 stars and wrote, "Madhavan the actor does a fine job of traversing a spectrum of moods - from elation fuelled by the character's professional highs to anguish triggered by his plummet into ignominy."

Janani K of India Today rated the film 2.5 out of 5 stars and wrote that it is "a film that could have been a phenomenal watch" and "despite the shortcomings, the story of Nambi Narayanan makes it a decent watch." In contrast, Gautaman Bhaskaran of News 18 rated the film 2.5 out of 5 stars and labelled the film as a "disappointing debut." Shubhra Gupta of The Indian Express rated the film 2.5 out of 5 stars and wrote, "R Madhavan makes you believe in the character, but the writing is stodgy, and the direction doesn’t quite make up for it."

Bharathi Pradhan of Lehren rated the film 2.5 out of 5 stars and wrote, "If only the writing had been skillful in bringing out and coalescing the humour, the brainwork, the international romps for research and nuclear deals, … Rocketry: The Nambi Effect would’ve been an overwhelming and nail-biting experience." Srinivasa Ramanujam of The Hindu noted "the first half feels like a science class, but the second, packs some emotional heft to ensure Rocketry lands well", calling the intention "noble." Avinash Ramachandran of Cinema Express noted that "Madhavan, Simran propel this compelling biopic." Monika Kukeja of the Hindustan Times gave the film a positive review, noting Madhavan "is a one man army who puts up a spectacular, inspiring show."

Several Indian film industry personalities publicly praised the film including Rajinikanth, Anupam Kher, Anirudh Ravichander and Shilpa Shetty. In August 2022, the film was screened for civil servants and politicians in the Parliament of India.

== Awards and nominations ==
Award	Date of the ceremony	Category	Recipients	Result	Ref.
Filmfare Awards	27 April 2023	Best Actor (Critics)	R. Madhavan	Nominated	
Filmfare Awards	27 April 2023	Best Film (Critics)	R. Madhavan	Nominated	
Filmfare Awards	27 April 2023	Best Supporting Actress	Simran	Nominated	
Filmfare Awards	27 April 2023	Best Debut Director	R. Madhavan	Nominated	
Filmfare Awards	27 April 2023	Best Special Effects	Assemblage Entertainment PVT.	Nominated	
IIFA Awards	26–27 May 2023	Best Director	R. Madhavan	Won	
IIFA Awards	26–27 May 2023	Best Male Playback Singer	Aditya Rao	Nominated	
National Film Awards	17 October 2023	Best Feature Film	Rocketry Entertainment LLP (producer); R. Madhavan (director)	Won	
South Indian International Movie Awards	15–16 September 2023	Best Actor in a Leading Role - Critics (Tamil)	R. Madhavan	Won	
South Indian International Movie Awards	15–16 September 2023	Best Debutant Director	R. Madhavan	Won	
South Indian International Movie Awards	15–16 September 2023	Best Film	Tricolour Films, Varghese Moolan Pictures, 27th Entertainment	Nominated	
South Indian International Movie Awards	15–16 September 2023	Best Actress in a Supporting Role	Simran	Nominated	
Filmfare Awards South	13 July 2024	Best Actor (Critics)	R.Madhavan	Won	
Filmfare Awards South	13 July 2024	Best Actress in a Supporting Role Tamil	Simran	Nominated	
