= Bijith Bala =

Indian filmmaker and writer (born 1979)

- Born: 29 May 1980 (age 46); Calicut, Kozhikode, Kerala, India
- Occupation: Film editor, Visual Graphics artist, director
- Spouse: Simi S Nair
- Children: Anmaya Bijith

Bijith Bala (born 29 May 1980) is an Indian film director/editor, who has worked predominantly in Indian movie industry. Bijith has worked in movies like Shutter (2012), Nellikka (2015), Vellam (2021), and Dug Dug. His editing career has included various languages.

== Career ==
Bijith began as a graphical designer in 2003. His first movie as a visual effect artist was Ente Veedu Appuvinteyum in 2003. Following that he worked in around 10 movies as a visual effects artist. In 2007 he moved to film editing field. He has many super hits in his editing career. In 2012 he worked as an associated director for the movie Shutter. In 2015 he has his directorial debut Nellikka. The movie was a musical family entertainer. In 2018 he has moved to Bollywood and did the editing work for Rocketry: The Nambi Effect. Later he has worked in his second Bollywood movie Dug Dug, which is directed by Ritwik Pareek and has selected in Toronto International Film Festival in 2021.

== Personal life ==
Bala was born to Balachandran and Rajalakshmi, in Calicut. He married Simi S. Nair and they have a daughter, Anmaya Bijith.

== Filmography ==
As editor

Year	Title	Language
2007	Aakasham	Malayalam
2008	Maya Bazar	Malayalam
2009	Angel John	Malayalam
2009	Kadha, Samvidhanam Kunchakko	Malayalam
2010	Apoorvaragam	Malayalam
2010	Thanthonni	Malayalam
2011	Violin	Malayalam
2012	Unnam	Malayalam
2012	Naughty Professor	Malayalam
2012	Shutter	Malayalam
2013	Rebecca Uthup Kizhakkemala	Malayalam
2014	Njangalude Veettile Athidhikal	Malayalam
2015	Kaliyachan	Malayalam
2015	Saigal Padukayanu	Malayalam
2018	Captain	Malayalam
2021	Vellam	Malayalam
2021	The Secret of Women	Malayalam
2021	Meri Awas Suno	Malayalam
2021	Dug Dug	Hindi
2022	Rocketry: The Nambi Effect	Tamil; Hindi; English
2025	Am Ah	Malayalam

As director

Year	Title
2014	Nellikka
2022	Padachone Ingalu Katholi

As trailer editor

Year	Title
2003	Ente Veedu Appuvinteyum
2003	Chakram
2003	Jalolsavam
2003	Kazhcha
2004	Amrutham
2004	MarathaNadu
2004	Kakkakarumban
2004	Udayananu Tharam
2004	Ben Johnson
2004	Lokanathan IAS
2005	Thanmathra
2006	Vadakkum Nathan
2006	Kisan
2006	Tanthra
2006	Note book
2006	Palunku
2007	Mayavi
2008	Maya Bazar
2009	Aayirathil Oruvan
2010	Apoorvaragam
2011	Violin
2012	Unnam
2012	Shutter
2015	Kaliyachan
2021	Vellam
2022	Rocketry: The Nambi Effect

As visual media artist

Year	Title
2003	Ente Veedu Appuvinteyum
2004	Amrutham
2005	Thanmathra
2006	Palunku
2008	Maya Bazar
2015	Kaliyachan

== Awards, nominations and recognitions ==
=== Film festival ===
- Official Selection on Toronto International Film Festival'2021 – Dug Dug
