= Subbayya =

Subbayya or Subbaiah (Telugu: సుబ్బయ్య, Kannada: ಸುಬ್ಬಯ್ಯ) is an Indian name commonly used in Andhra Pradesh, Kodagu (in Karnataka) and Tamil Nadu.

- Kodandera Subayya Thimayya, Indian General
- M.V. Subbaiah Naidu, Kannada and Telugu actor and director.
- Jagadeesh Subbaiah Moodera, Indian origin American physicist in MIT
- Subbayya Sivasankaranarayana Pillai, Indian mathematician, well known for his work in number theory
- Nidhi Subbaiah, Kannada actress
- S. M. Subbaiah Naidu, South Indian composer, conductor, and orchestrator
- Muthyala Subbaiah, Tollywood film director
- Subbiah Arunan, is an Indian scientist
