= Prajesh Sen =

Indian filmmaker and writer

G. Prajesh Sen
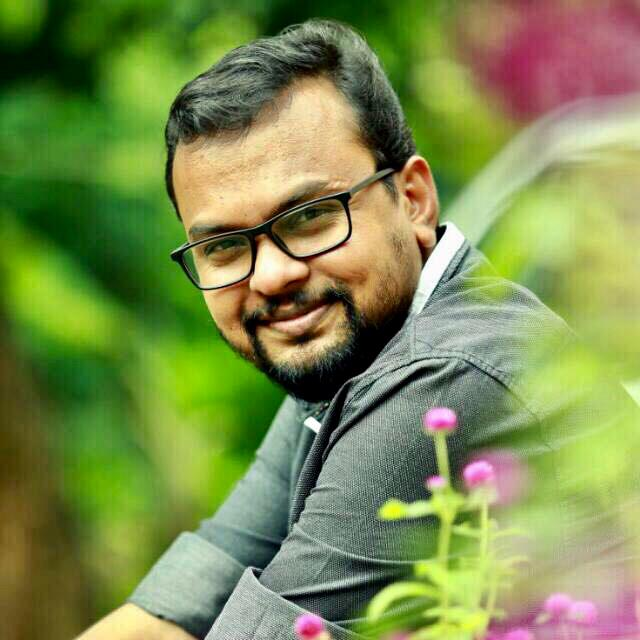
- 2019
- Born: May 29; Kilimanoor, Thiruvananthapuram, Kerala, India
- Occupations: Filmmaker; screenwriter; journalist
- Spouse: Sabeena S. K. (m. 2013)
- Children: 1

G. Prajesh Sen (also spelt G. Prajeshsen; born 29 May at Kilimanoor) is an Indian filmmaker and writer. In 2017, He has made his directorial debut with Captain, the first sports biopic in malayalam starring Jayasurya and Anu Sithara.

== Career ==
Prajesh Sen started his career as a journalist and media person. He worked in All India Radio Trivandrum and Madhyamam newspaper. He started his film career as an assistant director with Siddique.

He is the author of the biography Ormakalude Bhramanapadham based on the former Indian Space Research Organisation scientist Nambi Narayanan. He also made a documentary based on Nambi Narayanan, named Nambi The Scientist.

Sen worked with a Dutch director Jacco Groen in his street kids documentary series. He worked as an associate producer on Jacco Groen's The Road to Moscow, documenting the lives of nine girls chosen by Karunalaya Social Service Society to represent India at the Street Child World Cup 2018 in Moscow, Russia.

Sen worked as a co-director on Rocketry: The Nambi Effect, based on Nambi Narayanan's life. The movie has R. Madhavan playing the title role. His second movie, Vellam with Jayasurya in the lead role, was released on 22 January 2021. It was the first Malayalam movie released in theaters after the COVID-19 lockdown.Jayasurya bagged the 51st Kerala state best actor award for his stunning performance in Vellam and Shahbaz Aman was selected as the best male singer. Sen announced his third movie titled, The Secret of Women on 24 December 2020 with Niranjana Anoop in the lead role. Sen announced his fourth movie Meri Awas Suno starring Jayasurya and Manju Warrier

Sen is also associated with the renowned magician Prof. Gopinath Muthukad in his DAC activities. DAC - different art centre is established to focus on the emotional and intellectual growth of disabled children. On 2 October 2021, they gave a visual treat to the world and the program entitled Sahayathra was directed by Sen. DAC conducted their second visual treat to the world on 3 December 2021 and the program is entitled Veendum Sahayathra. During an interview with RJ Sneha of Dubai Club FM, on 23 March 2022, Sen announced his next biopic, that is based on the life of Ashraf Thamarassery who has dedicated his life to helping the UAE's deceased on their final journey home. The more details of the film are yet to be revealed.

In 2022 September, Sen conducted a 2-day certified acting workshop in Dubai in association with Club FM. The Emirati film director Nahla Hamad BinFahad Almuhairi was the chief guest during the workshop and has shared her professional experiences with the participants.

== Personal life ==
Prajesh Sen was born to Gopi N., and T. K. Lathika. He married Sabeena S. K. in 2013. They have a son named Alan P. Sen.

== Bibliography ==
- Cradles for Hire (2008)
- Manji: Story of a Test tube Orphan (2008)
- Finger of Ekalavya (2009)
- Molecules (2009)
- Ormakalude Bhramanapadham (written with Nambi Narayanan) (2017)
- Captain-Story of an unsung hero (2021)
- Athmabhashanangal (2021)
- Oduvilathe koottu (2021) - A book based on the life of Ashraf Thamarassery, who has dedicated his life to helping the UAE's deceased on their final journey home.
- Vellam (2022) - Screenplay of the movie Vellam - the essential drink (Vellam)
- The last Friend (2022)

== Filmography and television ==
Year	Title	Notes	Role
2018	Captain	Biopic of Indian football Captain VP Sathyan	Writer and Director
2018	Nambi The Scientist	Documentary on Nambi Narayanan	Writer and Director
2019	Streetkids United 3 – The Road to Moscow	Documentary film based on the life of Indian children selected in the Street Child World Cup	Associate Producer
2021	Vellam	Film based on a true story	Writer and Director
2021	Sahayathra	A program by the DAC nurtured students	Program Director
2021	Veendum Sahayathra	Visual treat by DAC nurtured children	Program Director
2022	Meri Awas Suno	Official remake of 2019 Bengali film Konttho.	Writer, Director
2022	Rocketry: The Nambi Effect	Film based on the life of Scientist Nambi Narayan	Co-director
2025	The secret of women	Released 2025 January	Writer, Director
2025	Houdini The King of magic	Post Production	Writer, Director,Producer

== Awards, nominations and recognitions ==
=== Film Awards ===
- 2022 : Gurupriya TV Award for the best Director for Vellam
- 2022 : India Darshan National Integration Awards
- 2022 : Prem Nazir award for the best direction for Vellam
- 2021 : Kerala Film Critics Association Awards as the best second director for Vellam.
- 2019 : South Indian International Movie Awards - Best Debutant Director (Nominated)
- 2019 : Kerala state Television Award – Special Mention award for "Nambi the Scientist" in Biographical documentary category
- 2018 : Flowers (TV channel) – Best Debutant director for Captain (2018 film)

=== Film festival ===
- Official Selection on IDSFFK'2019 – "Nambi the Scientist"
- Lakeside Film Festival'2019: "Nambi the scientist" selected as the inaugural movie

=== Media awards ===
- Ramnath Goenka award for excellence in journalism (2013)
- G. Venu Gopal award from Thiruvananthapuram Press Club
- K.C.Madhava Kurup Award (2010) by Calicut Press Club for Investigative Journalism.
- SBT Media Awards 2009 for Humanitarian Writing.
- Rajeevan Kavumbai Award (2009) by Kerala Press Academy for Best Feature.
- Theruvath Raman Award (2009) by Calicut Press Club for Investigative Journalism
- Fr.Columbiar Memorial Award (2009) for Investigative Reporting.
- R.Krishna Swami Award (2009) Jointly constituted by Kollam Press Club and Kerala Shabdam Weekly for Investigative Reporting.
- Keraleeyam V. K. Madhavan Kutty 2008 for Best Report on issues related to social integration.
- Vigilant Award (2008) for Human Rights Reporting.
- V.Karunakaran Nambiar Award 2008 by Kerala Press Academy for Best Report on health topics.
- Solidarity Media Award 2006 for Best Rural Reporting.
- Vocational Award 2005 from Rotary International for Rural Reporting.
