= Vellam (2021 film) =

2021 film directed by Prajesh Sen

Vellam: The Essential Drink
- Theatrical release poster
- Directed by: Prajesh Sen
- Written by: Prajesh Sen
- Produced by: Josekutty Madathil; Yadu Krishna; Ranjith Manambarakkat
- Starring: Jayasurya; Samyuktha; Siddique; Santhosh Keezhattoor; Johny Antony; Sreelakshmi
- Cinematography: Roby Varghese Raj
- Edited by: Bijith Bala
- Music by: Bijibal
- Production company: Friendly Productions LLP
- Distributed by: Central Pictures
- Release date: 22 January 2021
- Country: India
- Language: Malayalam

Vellam: The Essential Drink (lit. 'Water: The Essential Drink') is a 2021 Indian Malayalam-language biographical drama film written and directed by Prajesh Sen. It features Jayasurya and Samyuktha in lead roles with Siddique, Sreelakshmi, Santhosh Keezhattoor, Johny Antony in supporting roles.

The film is based on the life of a Kerala-born businessman Murali Kunnumpurath who turned his life from a full time alcoholic to a successful businessman. The film was released on 22 January 2021. The music was composed by Bijibal.

== Plot ==
Murali Nambiar is an alcoholic who becomes a burden for his family and the society around him. His family life comes under strain and his wife Sunitha and parents watch his decline helplessly. He even takes money and valuables from his home and his friends to buy alcohol, upsetting those close to him. He is even shown selling the furniture from his home once. After getting drunk, he often ends up sleeping on sidewalks and shop fronts. Once he is accused of stealing a gold ring at an engagement but turns out to be incorrect. He makes a scene at his friend's funeral because of some misunderstanding. Although he is often seen as a drunkard by his family and neighbours, a few people still talk about his cool demeanour and hardworking nature.

One day he talks about his addiction with one of his friends who takes him to a de-addiction centre where Dr. Subramaniam is the chief doctor. Dr. Subramaniam takes Murali under his wing, offering to treat his addiction. But Murali slacks off and continues to drink. The doctor contacts Sunitha who has left him earlier because of his excessive drinking and tells her that Murali needs love and care as part of the treatment.

After the treatment he returns to his homeplace where his friends continue to treat him as before, a drunkard. Murali gets back to his home and finds that his parents have sold their house and moved on. Seeing that no one is concerned about him, he attempts suicide by jumping into a well. But he is rescued and rushed to hospital. When Dr. Subramaniam learns this, he convinces Murali's family that he requires love and support. Murali then slowly becomes a successful entrepreneur and launches a product called "Waterman" tiles and even starts exporting them. The movie ends with Murali bringing another drunkard to Dr. Subramaniam for treatment, convinced that he too can reform, just like he has.

== Cast ==
- Jayasurya as Murali "Vellam Murali" Nambiar
- Samyuktha as Sunitha, Murali's wife
- Siddique as Dr. Subrahmanyam
- Santhosh Keezhattoor as Santhosh, Murali’s friend
- Baiju Santhosh as Saji
- Sreelakshmi as Latha, Murali's mother
- Edavela Babu as Babu
- Vettukili Prakash
- Babu Annur as Murali's father
- Sneha Paliyeri
- Priyanka as Vijayan's wife
- Mafia Sasi as Rehabilitation hospital employee
- Johny Antony
- Indrans as Chandran, a drunkard friend of Murali (cameo appearance)
- Nirmal Palazhi as Vijayan, Murali's friend
- Bala Sankar Venugopal as Murali's friend
- Jins Baskar as Murali's friend
- Zinil Zainudeen
- Kochouseph Chittilappilly as himself
- Murali Kunnumpurath as himself (cameo appearance)
- Josekutty Madathil
- Sruthi Roshan as Jiji
- Kannur Sreelatha
- Muhammed Perambra
- Vinitha Vellimana
- Subeesh Sudhi as Vasu

== Production ==
In February 2019, Jayasurya announced that he and Prajesh Sen are collaborating again after Captain (2018). Announcing the title of the film, Jayasurya said that the character in Vellam is his toughest character in his career to date. Vellam was produced by Friendly Productions. Title carries the tagline "The Essential Drink". Production of the film started in November 2019.

== Music ==
All the music tracks were composed by Bijibal and lyrics are penned by B.K Harinarayanan and Nidheesh Nadery.

Vellam: The Essential Drink
No.	Title	Lyrics	Singer(s)	Length
1.	"Pulariyilachante"	Nidheesh Naderi	Ananya
2.	"Oru Kuri Kandu Naam"	B K Harinarayanan	Viswanathan
3.	"Akashamayavale"	Nidheesh Naderi	Shahabaz Aman
4.	"Choka chokannoru Sooryan"	Nidheesh Naderi	Bhadra Rajin

== Release ==
Vellam was initially planned for a theatrical release but was postponed indefinitely due to closures of theatres. It was announced that the film would release on 22 January 2021. In April 2021, the film began streaming on Sun NXT.

== Awards and nominations ==
=== 51st Kerala State Film Awards ===
- Best Actor - Jayasurya
- Best Male Playback Singer - Shahabaz Aman

=== Kerala Film Critics Association Awards ===
- Second Best Director-Prajesh Sen
- 2021 : Kerala Film Critics Association Award for Second Best Film.
- 2021 : Kerala Film Critics Association Award for Best Actress - Samyuktha Menon.

=== 10th South Indian International Movie Awards ===
- Best Music Director - Bijibal
- Best Debut Producer - Friendly Productions

=== Prem Nazir Awards ===
- Best Director - Prajesh Sen
- Best Movie - Vellam

== Reception ==
Upon release the film garnered mostly positive responses.

Prem Udayabhanu of Manorama News reviewer rated the movie 3 out of 5 and said; "Jayasurya's stellar performance is Vellam's highlight, but the film portrays a lofty message. Anjana George of Times of India gave the film a 4 out of 5.

Ashutosh Mohan of Film Companion wrote, "What keeps it watchable, apart from Jayasurya, is the film’s take on alcoholism: it’s a problem but it’s not a vice. A character in the film even says that there’s nothing wrong with alcohol as long as it doesn’t run (and ruin) your life." Keerthi Krishna of Mathrubhumi praised Jayasurya's performance.
