= M. R. Kurup =

Indian rocket scientist and founder of India's first solid rocket propellant plant

- Born: Chengannur, Travancore (present-day Chengannur, Kerala, India)
- Died: India
- Other name: Madhavan Pillai Ramakrishna Kurup
- Occupation: Rocket scientist
- Known for: Solid rocket propulsion technology
- Parent: C. N. Madhavan Pillai
- Awards: Padma Shri

Madhavan Pillai Ramakrishna Kurup was an Indian rocket scientist and the founder of the first solid rocket propellant plant in India at the Vikram Sarabhai Space Centre. He is known to have contributed to the successful launching of the Augmented Satellite Launch Vehicle (ASLV) as the director of the VSSC centre in Thiruvananthapuram. The Government of India awarded him the fourth highest civilian award of Padma Shri in 1990.

== Biography ==
Kurup was born in Chengannur, in the south Indian state of Kerala to C. N. Madhavan Pillai, a lawyer. Kurup started his career by joining the Vikram Sarabhai Space Centre (VSSC) of the Indian Space Research Organisation (ISRO). He worked in VSSC in various capacities such as General Manager, Deputy Director and Chief Executive of Chemicals, Materials and Propulsion unit where he had the opportunity to work alongside A. P. J. Abdul Kalam, the space scientist who would later become the President of India. During his tenure there, he established the first solid rocket propulsion plant in the country for propellants, propulsion and pyrotechnics. He was a member of the team selected by Vikram Sarabhai to design the first Indian satellite launch vehicle, which was composed of Kurup, Vasant Gowarikar, A. E. Muthunayagam and Udupi Ramachandra Rao among others. He was the Design Project Leader of the second stage and was closely associated with the project till the launch of the vehicle on 10 August 1979. Later, he moved to Satish Dhawan Space Centre in Sriharikota in Andhra Pradesh, established a similar plant in the 1970s and superannuated from service as the director of the SHAR centre.

The Government of India included him in the 1990 Republic Day honours list for the civilian award of the Padma Shri. The Indian Society for Non-Destructive Testing has instituted an annual lecture, the M. R. Kurup Memorial Lecture, in his honour.

== See also ==
- Satish Dhawan Space Centre
- Indian Space Research Organisation
- Vasant Gowarikar
- A.E. Muthunayagam
- Vikram Sarabhai
- Udupi Ramachandra Rao
