= Kadha, Samvidhanam Kunchakko =

- Directed by: Haridas Kesavan
- Written by: Dennis Joseph
- Produced by: Manoj Ramsingh
- Starring: Sreenivasan; Meena
- Cinematography: Sajeth Menon
- Edited by: Bijith Bala
- Music by: M. Jayachandran
- Release date: 13 February 2009
- Country: India
- Language: Malayalam

Kadha, Samvidhanam Kunchakko is a 2009 Malayalam-language psychological thriller directed by Haridas Kesavan, and produced by Manoj Ramsingh. The film features Sreenivasan in dual role and Meena in the lead roles.

== Plot ==
Kunchacko is a no-holds-barred money minter who has chopped off heads and hearts on his way to the top of the world. Marrying Ann Mary prompts him to turn a few new green leaves, though he soon figures out that making amends is not as easy as it seems.

== Cast ==
- Sreenivasan in a dual role as:
  - Kunchacko
  - Kuncheria (Father Cleetus Poovarani)
- Meena as Ann Mary
- Thilakan as Dr Antony Varkey
- Augustine as Kariyappan
- Roslin as Ann Mary's mother
- K. B. Ganesh Kumar as SP Manoj Pothan IPS
- Sudheesh as Baby
- Shivaji Guruvayoor as Sadanandan
- Janardhanan as Chief Minister Sukumaran Varma
- Sona Nair
- Prem Kumar as Dr. Mathew Kurian
- E.A. Rajendran as Chandran Pillai
- Jagathy Sreekumar
- Lakshmipriya as Dr. Mathew Kurian's wife
