= Unnam =

- Promotional Poster
- Directed by: Sibi Malayil
- Written by: Swathi Bhaskar
- Produced by: Noushad; Basheer
- Starring: Sreenivasan; Lal; Asif Ali; Nedumudi Venu; Rima Kallingal; Swetha Menon
- Cinematography: Ajayan Vincent
- Edited by: Bijith Bala
- Music by: John P. Varkey
- Distributed by: R.R Entertainment Release
- Release date: 10 February 2012
- Country: India
- Language: Malayalam

Unnam(transl. Aim) is a 2012 Indian Malayalam-language neo-noir psychological crime drama thriller film directed by Sibi Malayil, starring Lal, Asif Ali and Sreenivasan.

The film is an official remake of the 2007 Hindi film Johnny Gaddaar which itself was an uncredited adaptation of the 1963 French movie Symphonie Pour Un Massacre (The Corrupt) by Jacques Deray which in turn was based on the 1962 French crime novel Les Mystifies by Alain Reynaud Fourton.

== Synopsis ==
A gang of five gamblers tries to crack a deal that will earn them a huge sum of money. However, things get complicated when one of them alters the plan.

== Cast ==
- Sreenivasan as Balakrishna
- Lal as Kalapuraickal Sunny
- Asif Ali as Aloshy Andrews,the main antagonist
- Nedumudi Venu as Murugan
- Prashant Narayanan as Tomy Eappan
- Rima Kallingal as Jennifer/Jenni/Maya, Tommy's wife and Aloshy's girlfriend
- Swetha Menon as Sereena
- Chitra Iyer as Padma
- Rajesh Hebbar as Vikraman
- Sasi Kalinga as Kammatam Lopez
- Chembil Ashokan
- KPAC Lalitha as Basheer's mother

== Awards ==
Ceremony	Category	Nominee	Result
2nd South Indian International Movie Awards	Best Actor in a Negative Role	Asif Ali	Nominated
