= Nellikka =

2015 film by Bijith Bala

- Directed by: Bijith Bala
- Written by: PR Arun
- Produced by: Abdul Rathoof
- Starring: Atul Kulkarni; Deepak Parambol; Sashi Kumar; Parveen; Bhagath Manuel
- Cinematography: Kunjunni S kumar
- Edited by: Bijith Bala
- Music by: Bijibal
- Distributed by: Kalpaka Films
- Release date: 27 February 2015
- Country: India
- Language: Malayalam

Nellikka is a 2015 Malayalam-language film written by P R Arun and directed by Bijith Bala. The film stars Deepak Parambol with Atul Kulkarni, Sashi Kumar, and Bhagath Manuel in supporting roles. The film is a musical family film. Prakash Marar, Santhosh Varma, and Rafeeq Ahmed wriote songs for the film.

== Plot ==
The story revolves around Balu. Balu after the completion of his studies from North India returns home, jobless. He was warmly welcomed by his father Hari an M. S. Baburaj fan and by his sister Nandhana. Hari is an ardent fan of M. S. Baburaj while the son is a fan of Bob Marley. After his arrival he meets Nandu's fiancé Satheesh. They create an instant friendship to each other. Satheesh is a polished modern man working as a manager in Bank. He helped Balu to resolve the issue with his ex-girlfriend and their relationship bloomed again. Balu also heads an immature band. Everything was fine till Balu realises his brother in law's demeanor is not very real.

== Cast ==
- Deepak Parambol as Balu
- Parveen as Nandhana
- Atul Kulkarni as Satheesh
- Sashi Kumar as Hari
- Sija Rose as Priya
- Bhagath Manuel
- Mammukkoya
- Koottickal Jayachandran
- Sunil Sukhada

== Songs ==
There are seven songs in this movie. Four songs are written by Prakash Marar, two by Santhosh Varma and one song is by Rafeeq Ahamed. The music is composed by Bijibal and the BGM was also provided by him.

Songs list

1. "Swapna CHirakil": Sachin Warrier
2. "Unaroo": Sayanora Philip
3. "Noorey Illahi": Berny, Krishna Bingane, Nila Madhab
4. "Chirakurummi": Najim Arshad, Aparna Rajeev
5. "Ravin Nizhaloram" : Remya Nambeesan
6. "Maranamillatha" : Aslam Abdul Majeed
