= Nambi Narayanan =

Indian rocket scientist (born 1941)

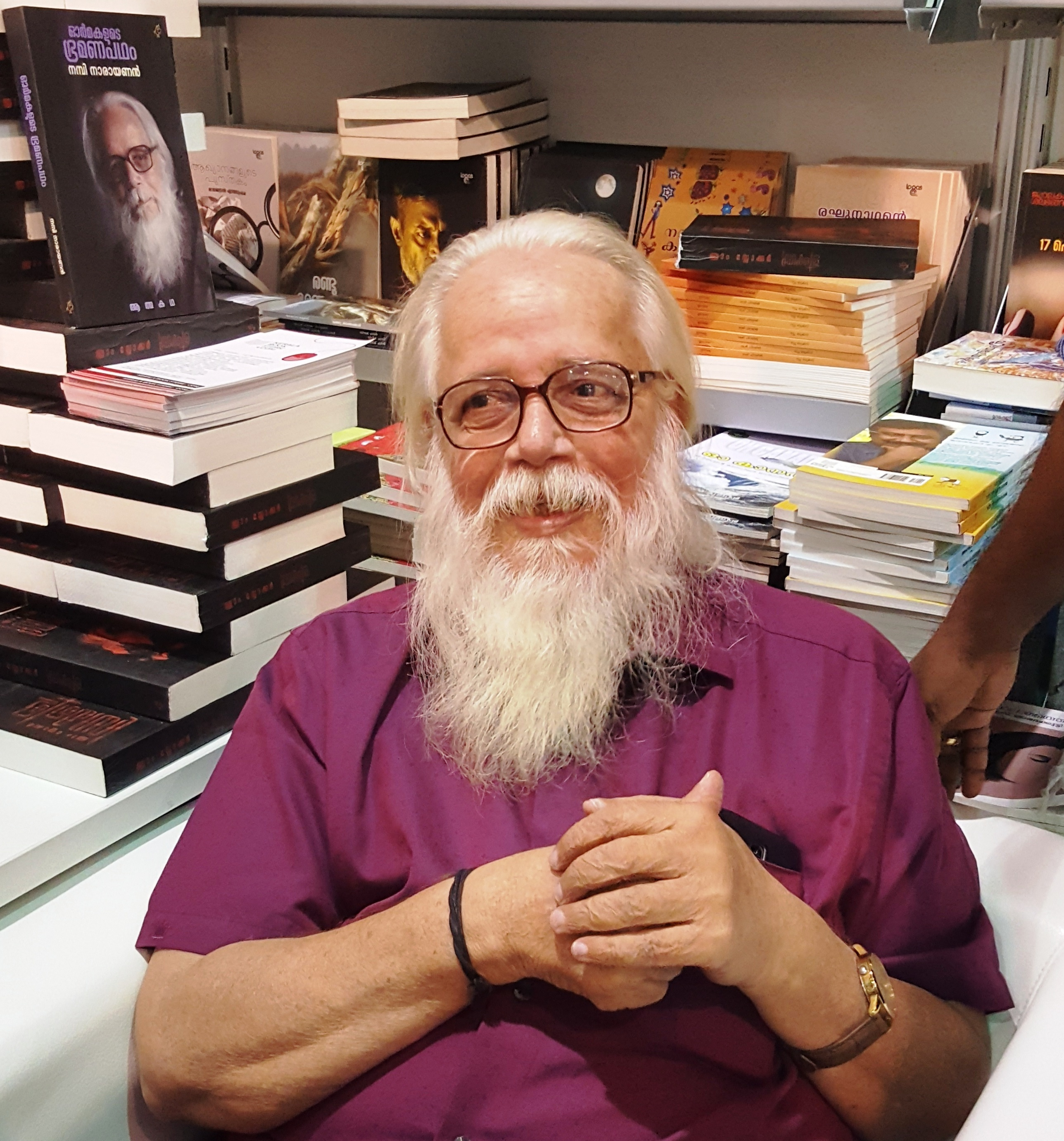
- Narayanan in 2017
- Born: 12 December 1941 (age 84); Nagercoil, Kingdom of Travancore, British India (present day Kanyakumari, Tamil Nadu, India)
- Education: Princeton University (Master of Science in Engineering); Thiagarajar College of Engineering, Madurai (Bachelor of Technology)
- Occupation: Aerospace engineer
- Spouse: Meena Narayanan
- Children: 2
- Relatives: Subbiah Arunan (son-in-law)
- Awards: Padma Bhushan (2019)

Nambi Narayanan (born 12 December 1941) is an Indian aerospace scientist who worked for the Indian Space Research Organisation (ISRO). As a senior official at the ISRO, he was briefly in charge of the cryogenics division. He was awarded the Padma Bhushan, India's third-highest civilian award, in March 2019.

In 1994, he was arrested on charges of espionage, which were found to be baseless by the Central Bureau of Investigation (CBI) in April 1996. As a result, the Supreme Court of India dismissed all charges against him and prohibited the Government of Kerala from continuing its investigation. In 2018, a Supreme Court bench headed by then Chief Justice Dipak Misra, awarded Narayanan compensation of ₹50 lakh (equivalent to ₹67 lakh or US$69,000 in 2023). Additionally, the Government of Kerala then awarded him further compensation of roughly ₹1.3 crore (equivalent to ₹1.7 crore or US$180,000 in 2023) in 2019. The film Rocketry: The Nambi Effect, based on his life, starring and directed by R. Madhavan, was released in July 2022.

== Early and personal life ==
Nambi Narayanan was born on 12 December 1941 in Nagercoil, in the erstwhile Princely state of Travancore (present-day Kanyakumari District). He completed his schooling at Higher Secondary School, Nagercoil. He received a Bachelor of Technology in Mechanical Engineering from Thiagarajar College of Engineering, Madurai. Narayanan lost his father while pursuing his degree in Madurai, with his mother falling sick soon after. He had two sisters. Nambi married Meena Narayanan and has two children. Their son, Shankar Narayanan, is a businessman. Their daughter, Geetha Arunan, is a Montessori school teacher in Bangalore and is married to Subbiah Arunan, an ISRO scientist, who was the director of the Mars Orbiter Mission and a Padma Shri awardee.

== Career ==
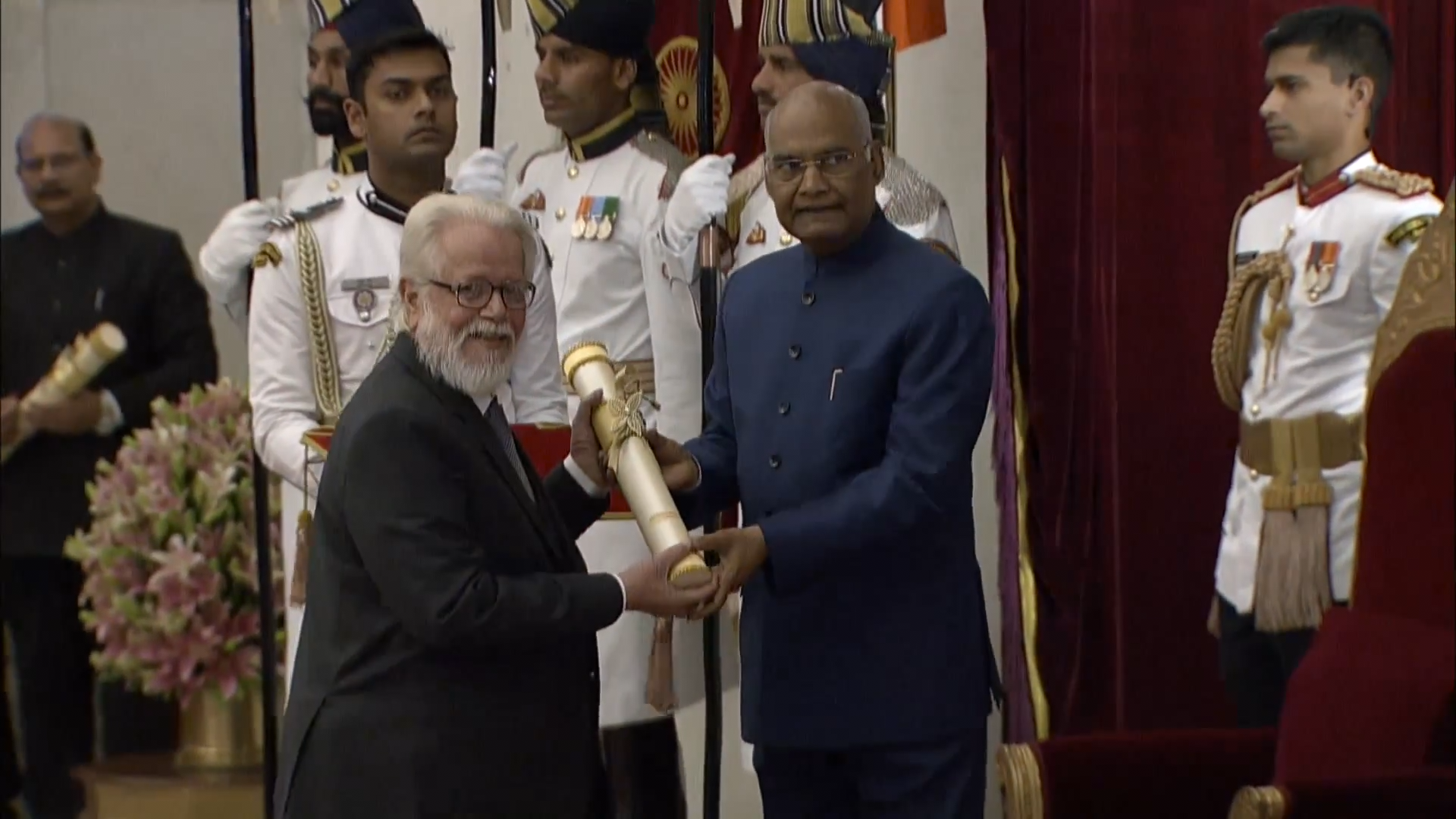
Nambi Narayanan receiving the Padma Bhushan in 2019.

After studying mechanical engineering in Madurai, Narayanan started his career in 1966 at ISRO as a technical assistant at the Thumba Equatorial Rocket Launching Station. He was sent to Princeton University on deputation at Government of India's expense in 1969. He completed his master's program there in chemical rocket propulsion under professor Luigi Crocco. He returned to India with expertise in liquid propulsion at a time when Indian rocketry was still solely dependent on solid propellants. He has claimed that he had to educate Sarabhai on liquid propulsion technology in his book.

== ISRO espionage charges ==
On 30 November 1994, Narayanan was arrested as part of an investigation of alleged espionage, by a team of Kerala Police and Intelligence Bureau officials, based on the videographed statements by a colleague that he and Narayanan had received money for transferring drawings and documents of rocket engines to two Maldivian women, Mariam Rasheeda and Fauziyya Hassan, who were suspected to be spies. In December 1994, the transfer of the case to the Central Bureau of Investigation (CBI) was criticized in media and by opposition parties in Kerala. CBI was seen to be dominated by P. V. Narasimha Rao, then-Prime Minister of India and some of the people named in the investigation were close to Rao and K. Karunakaran, then-Chief Minister of Kerala.

Narayanan spent 50 days in jail. He claims that officials from the Intelligence Bureau, who initially interrogated him, wanted him to make false accusations against the top brass of ISRO. He alleges that two IB officials had asked him to implicate A. E. Muthunayagam, his boss and then-director of the Liquid Propulsion Systems Centre (LPSC), saying that when he refused to comply, he was tortured until he collapsed and was hospitalised. He says his main complaint against ISRO is that it did not support him. K. Kasturirangan, who was ISRO chairman at the time, stated that ISRO could not interfere in a legal matter. He has written that the director of CBI Vijaya Rama Rao met him in jail on 8 December (four days after the case was transferred), when he explained to the director that the drawings of rockets and engines were not classified and has expressed that the CBI director wondered how the case had gotten so far and apologized in that meeting.

In April 1996, before the 1996 Indian general election, CBI submitted a closure report, saying that there was no espionage and that the testimonies of suspects were coerced by torture. In a previous order in a related case, Kerala High Court, which had seen the videos of interrogation, had dismissed allegations of torture and made critical comments about CBI's failure to follow all the leads. Amid attention on gaps in the CBI closure report, a challenge of the report in Kerala High Court by S. Vijayan, a police officer and continuing political pressure, the Kerala government revoked the permission granted previously to CBI to investigate the case and ordered the Kerala police to take it up again. But a Supreme Court bench stopped it in April 1998 saying that "the CBI found that no case had been made out" and ordered the Kerala government to pay ₹1 lakh (equivalent to ₹4.5 lakh or US$4,700 in 2023) to each of the accused (including Narayanan). In September 1999, the National Human Rights Commission (NHRC) passed strictures against the government of Kerala for having damaged Narayanan's distinguished career in space research along with the physical and mental torture to which he and his family were subjected. After the dismissal of charges against them, the two scientists, Sasikumar and Narayanan were transferred out of Thiruvananthapuram and were given desk jobs.

In 2001, the NHRC ordered the Government of Kerala to pay him a compensation of ₹1 crore (equivalent to ₹4.0 crore or US$410,000 in 2023). He retired in 2001. The Kerala High Court ordered a compensation amount of ₹10 lakh (equivalent to ₹19 lakh or US$20,000 in 2023) to be paid to Nambi Narayanan based on an appeal from NHRC India in September 2012.

On 14 September 2018, the Supreme Court appointed a panel to probe the "harrowing" arrest and alleged torture of Narayanan. A three-judge bench led by Chief Justice Dipak Misra also awarded Narayanan ₹50 lakh (equivalent to ₹67 lakh or US$69,000 in 2023) in compensation for the mental cruelty he suffered all these years. The same month, Narayanan's name was recommended for Padma awards by Rajeev Chandrasekhar, then a BJP member of parliament.

=== Recent developments ===
In 2021, the Kerala government settled the case filed against it by Narayanan by agreeing to a payment of ₹1.3 crore (US$130,000).

On 14 April 2021 the Supreme Court of India ordered a CBI probe into the involvement of police officers in the conspiracy. Several of the involved police officers filed petitions in different courts in Kerala lodging documents which they claimed showed transfer of lands between 2004 and 2008 by Narayanan to various CBI officers involved in the investigation, were produced. The Kerala High Court dismissed the pleas, stating the documents did not show land sales but gave permission for the petitioners to file a fresh case if they could provide sale records .

President Kovind presents the Padma Bhushan to Nambi Narayanan

== Awards ==
- March 2019: Padma Bhushan, India's third-highest civilian award.

== Bibliography ==
=== Books ===
- Ormakalude Bhramanapadham: An Autobiography by Nambi Narayanan, Prajesh Sen; Thrissur Current Books, 2017.
- Ready To Fire: How India and I Survived the ISRO Spy Case by Nambi Narayanan, Arun Ram; Bloomsbury India, 2018.

== Legacy ==
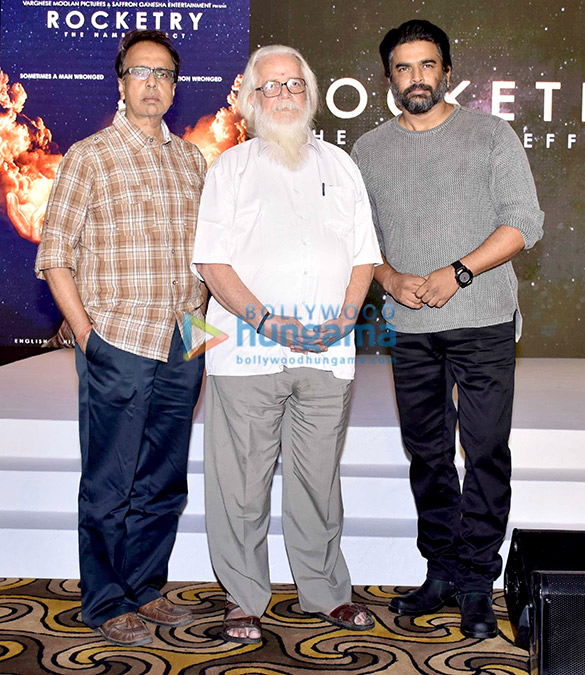
Nambi Narayanan (center) with R. Madhavan and Anant Mahadevan, during film trailer release, 2018

- In July 2022, a biographical film was made titled Rocketry: The Nambi Effect, written, directed by R. Madhavan, who also played the titular role of Narayanan. The film won the Best Feature Film award at the 69th Indian National Film Awards in 2023.

== See also ==
- Kuldeep Sharma (Cop)
- R. B. Sreekumar
- Sanjiv Bhatt
- Haren Pandya
