= Shahina K. K. =

Indian journalist

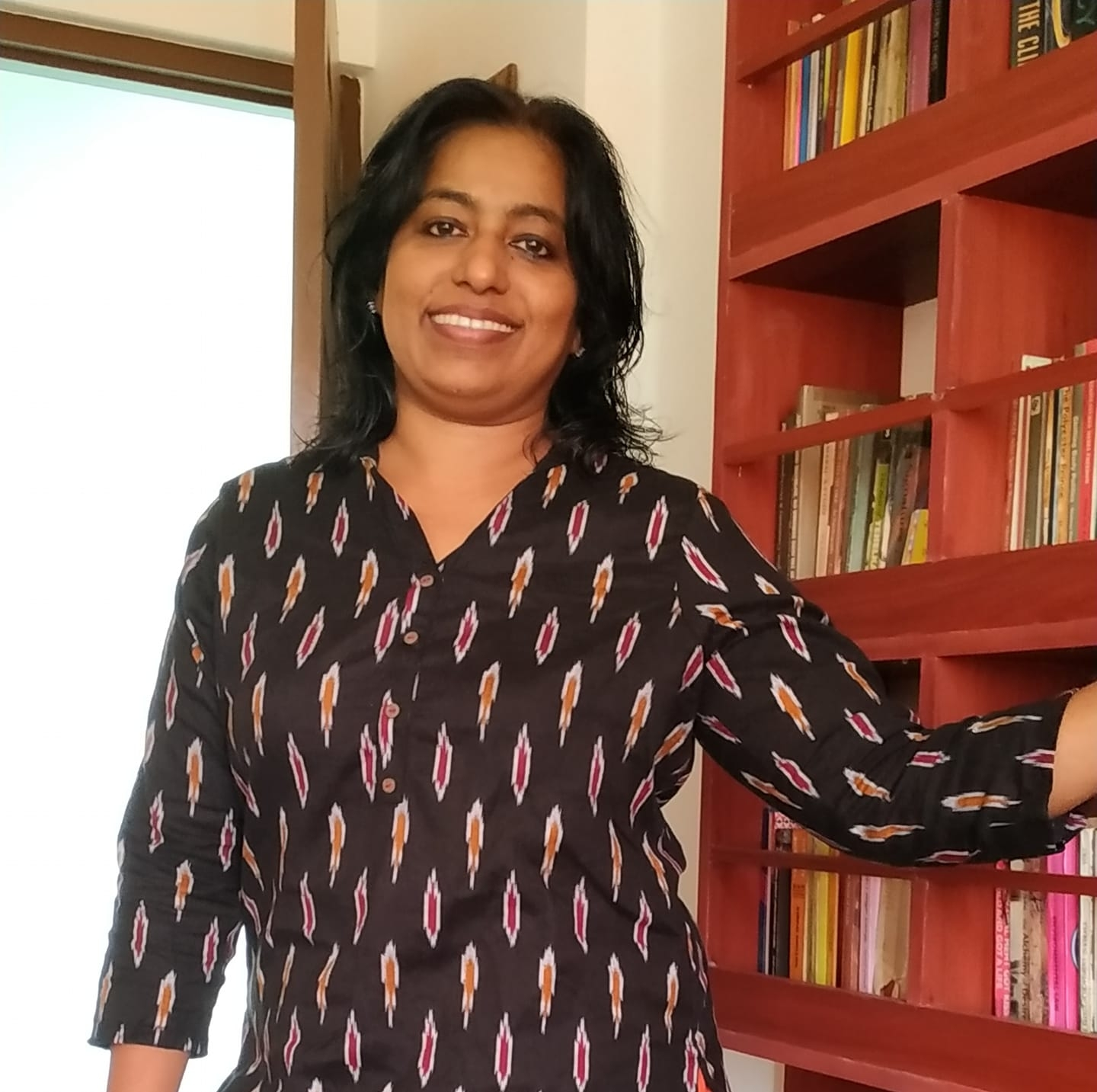
- Born: Konathukunnu
- Citizenship: Indian
- Education: Kerala Press Academy, Government Law College, Ernakulam, National Law School of India University, Bangalore
- Occupation: Journalist
- Employer(s): Asianet Television, Janayugom
- Awards: CPJ International Press Freedom Awards 2023, Chameli Devi Jain Award for Outstanding Women Mediapersons 2011
- Website: shahinakk.com

Shahina K. K. is an Indian journalist who is the founder and editor of Offbeat Concerns (OBC), an independent journalism and media literacy initiative. She also teaches at the Kerala Media Academy. Her reporting has focused on amplifying underrepresented voices and examining the intersection of law, governance, and public policy in southern India.

== Education ==
She holds a Master's degree in English Language and Literature, a Postgraduate Diploma in Mass Communication and Journalism, a Bachelor of Laws (LL.B.), and a Postgraduate Diploma in Human Rights Law.

== Career ==
Shahina served as Senior Editor at Outlook magazine, and was Associate Editor at The Federal and Open magazine, and Special Correspondent at Tehelka. She began her journalism career with Asianet in 1997.

Shahina was the first recipient of the Kerala State Television Journalism Award and the first female journalist from both print and television to receive this honor. She declined the award in protest against the alleged atrocities committed by the then Kerala government against journalists M K Ramdas of Asianet and P. K. Prakash of Madhyamam.

Shahina's work has received the International Press Freedom Award (2023), the Chameli Devi Jain Award for Outstanding Woman Journalist, the Laadli Media Fellowship, and the WISCOMP Scholar of Peace Media Fellowship. She has also been a speaker at the International Journalism Festival in Perugia, Italy, 2024.

She has been prosecuted under India's Unlawful Activities (Prevention) Act (UAPA) in connection with an investigative report, a case widely regarded by press freedom advocates as emblematic of the legal challenges journalists face in India.
