= Chowara Parameswaran =

Indian journalist and freedom fighter

- Born: 15 June 1884; Chowara, Ernakulam
- Died: December 1968 (aged 84); Aluva, Kerala
- Education: University of Madras
- Occupation: Journalist
- Known for: Indian independence movement

Chowara Parameswaran was an Indian journalist, rationalist, reformer, and translator. He is also known as Chowara Gandhi. He participated in the All-Kerala Political Conference held at Palakkad in 1921 and participated in the Vaikom Satyagraha in 1924, the Civil Disobedience Movement in 1930 and the Quit India Movement in 1942. After independence, he worked as a journalist and fought for the rights of journalists. He died on 20 December 1968.

== Chowara Parameswaran Award ==
The Chowara Parameswaran Award, established in 1992, is presented by the Kerala Press Academy in his honor. The award was instituted by the Chowara Parameswaran Memorial Committee in Kochi.
