= Meri Awas Suno =

2022 film directed by Prajesh Sen

- Theatrical release poster
- Directed by: Prajesh Sen
- Written by: Prajesh Sen
- Produced by: B. Rakesh
- Starring: Jayasurya; Manju Warrier; Sshivada; Gauthami Nair; Johny Antony
- Cinematography: Vinod Illampally
- Edited by: Bijith Bala
- Music by: M Jayachandran
- Production company: Universal Cinema
- Release date: May 13, 2022
- Running time: 130 minutes
- Country: India
- Language: Malayalam

Meri Awas Suno (transl. Listen to my Voice) is a 2022 Indian Malayalam-language musical drama film written and directed by Prajesh Sen and produced by B. Rakesh. A remake of Bengali film Konththo (2019) by Nandita Roy and Shiboprosad Mukherjee, it stars Jayasurya, Manju Warrier and Sshivada. Johny Antony, Gautami Nair and Sudheer Karamana also play major roles. The film tells the story of a radio jockey and speech therapist.

The music is by M Jayachandran and the lyrics are by BK Harinarayanan. This is the first time Jayasurya and Manju Warrier share the screen space. Thiruvananthapuram is the film's shooting location. The first look poster of the movie was released on 13 February 2021, which is World Radio Day. The movie was released on May 13, 2022. Principal photography was started at Thiruvananthapuram

== Premise ==
Shankar, a radio jockey, is shattered when he is diagnosed with laryngeal cancer. After finding out that he will lose his voice in the process of treatment, all hope is lost for him. However, he is aided by Dr Reshmi, a speech therapist to accept his new life and move forward.

== Cast ==
- Jayasurya as R.J. Shankar.
- a speech therapist.
- Sshivada as Priya, Shankar's wife.
- Archith Abhilash as Appu, Shankar's son.
- Johny Antony as R. K. V. Moorthy.
- Gautami Nair as R.J. Pauly.
- Mithun Venugopal as R.J. Koshy.
- Sudheer Karamana as Dr. Sunil Shenoy.
- G. Suresh Kumar as Dr. Venugopal.
- Devi Ajith as Dr. Shiny.
- Maya Vishwanath as the nurse.
- R.Madhavan as the Major, Reshmi's Husband (voice presence only)
- Gopinath Muthukad as himself.
- Shyamaprasad as himself.
- Shaji Kailas as himself.
- A.N Nazeer as himself.

== Production ==
=== Development ===
This is the first time Jayasurya and Manju Warrier share the screen space.

=== Filming ===
Principal photography was started at Thiruvananthapuram.

Thiruvananthapuram, Mumbai and Kashmir were the film's shooting locations. The first look poster of the movie was released on 13 February 2021, coinciding World Radio Day.

== Release ==
=== Theatrical ===
The film was released in theatres on 13 May 2022.

=== Home media ===
The digital rights of the film is acquired by Disney+ Hotstar and started streaming from 24 June 2022. The satellite rights of the film is acquired by Asianet.

== Reception ==
The film received positive reviews from critics and audiences. Times of India gave 3/5 and wrote, " A survival family drama". The News Minute gave 2.5/5 and wrote, "This Manju-Jayasurya film is interesting, but too dramatised". RJ. Princy Alexander of Onmanorama wrote "Though the movie will uplift your mood with its encouraging tone and beautiful blend of emotion, 'Meri Awaa Suno' should have taken some more time to leave a deeper effect on the audience".
