= Captain (2018 film) =

- Theatrical release poster
- Directed by: Prajesh Sen
- Written by: Prajesh Sen
- Produced by: T. L. George
- Starring: Jayasurya; Anu Sithara; Renji Panicker; Deepak Parambol; Saiju Kurup; Siddique
- Cinematography: Roby Varghese Raj
- Edited by: Bijith Bala
- Music by: Gopi Sundar
- Production company: Goodwill Entertainments
- Distributed by: Anto Joseph Film Company, Popcorn Entertainments Australia
- Release date: 16 February 2018
- Running time: 144 minutes
- Country: India
- Language: Malayalam

Captain is a 2018 Indian Malayalam-language biographical sports drama film written and directed by Prajesh Sen (in his directorial debut). The film is about V. P. Sathyan, former captain of the India national football team, with Jayasurya portraying him. It also stars Anu Sithara, Renji Panicker, Siddique, Deepak Parambol, Saiju Kurup, Kamal Varadoor and Lakshmi Sharma. Jayasurya won the Kerala State Film Award for Best Actor for his performance in the film.

== Cast ==
- Jayasurya as V P Sathyan, former Indian footballer and Inspector of Kerala Police
  - Adwaith as Young V P Sathyan
- Anu Sithara as Anitha Sathyan, wife of V.P Sathyan.
- Renji Panicker as Coach Jaffer, coach of Kerala Police football club.
- Siddique as Maithanam, a football enthusiast
- Saiju Kurup as SP Gupta IPS, senior officer of V.P Sathyan while he worked in Kerala Police Department.
- Deepak Parambol as U. Sharaf Ali, former Indian footballer, teammate of V.P Sathyan.
- Lakshmi Sharma as Sathyan's mother
- Janardhanan as K.Karunakaran, ex chief minister of Kerala
- Sreelatha Namboothiri as Anitha's grandmother
- Ambika Mohan as Anitha's mother
- Thalaivasal Vijay as DYSP Rajashekaran
- Dhritiman Chatterjee as Mr. Sinha
- Santhosh Keezhattoor as Sathyan's elder brother
- Shaiju Damodaran as Sports Journalist (cameo appearance) and Football Commentator (voice only)
- Mammootty in cameo appearance as himself
- Shiyas Kareem as South Korean Goalkeeper
- Nirmal Palazhi as Kittan
- Anna A Smith as Athira, Sathyan's daughter
- Joby George Cameo appearance
- Akshaya as Sathyan's sister
- Nilja as Anitha's Friend
- Daya as Anitha (Childhood)

== Production ==
Based on the life of former India national football team captain V. P. Sathyan, who, owning a good career history, committed suicide in 2006, Jayasurya announced the film in October 2016, with debutant Prajesh Sen as director and T. L. George of Goodwill Entertainments as producer. It began filming in early April 2017 in Kozhikode. A Santhosh Trophy match sequence was shot at Calicut University Stadium in Thenhipalam, during which Jayasurya injured his right leg, leading to a stay of filming for one week.

== Music ==
Songs and score were composed by Gopi Sundar. The film's audio was released by minister K. T. Jaleel on 28 January 2018, by awarding it to Anitha Sathyan, V. P. Sathyan's wife. As part of the event, a football match between teams Golden 90s led by I. M. Vijayan and Captain Elevens led by Jayasurya was organised at the Safari Ground, Edappal, which was kicked off by C.K. Vineeth.

Soundtrack
No.	Title	Lyrics	Singer(s)	Length
1.	"Paalthira Paadum"	Rafeeq Ahamed	Shreya Ghoshal	4:35
2.	"Peythalinja Nimisham"	B. K. Harinarayanan	P. Jayachandran, Vani Jairam	5:18
3.	"Paattu Petty (Music by Viswajith)"	Nitheesh Naderi, Swathy Chakraborthy	P. Jayachandran	5:26
4.	"Nithyamurulum (Captain Theme)"	Rafeeq Ahamed	Gopi Sundar	5:17
Total length:				20:36
