= Subbiah =

Subbiah is a male Indian name of Hindu origin meaning, "Great Man." Notable people with the name include:

Given or middle name

- A. R. Subbiah Mudaliar, Indian politician
- C. P. Subbiah Mudaliar (1895–1967), Indian freedom fighter
- M. Subbiah Pandian, Indian politician
- Subbiah Arunachalam (born 1941), Indian information consultant
- Subbiah Arunan, Indian space scientist

Surname

- M. V. Subbiah, Indian industrialist
- S. Subbiah, Indian politician
- Saravana Subbiah, Indian film director and actor
- Saraswathi Subbiah (1924–2005), Indian communist politician
- Susi Ganeshan (born Ganesan Subbiah in 1971), Indian film director, producer and screenwriter
- V. Subbiah (1911–1993), Indian communist politician
- G. Venkatasubbiah (1913–2021), Kannada writer, grammarian, editor, lexicographer and critic
