= B. Rakesh =

Indian film producer

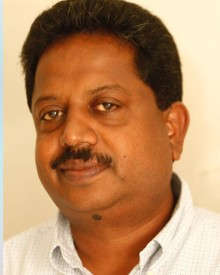
- Born: Rakesh Bahuleyan; 1965-04-28; Chadayamangalam, Kollam
- Occupation: Film producer
- Years active: 1992–present
- Spouse: Dr. Sindhu Rakesh
- Children: Anand Rakesh
- Parent(s): G Bahuleyan and P Leelabai

B. Rakesh (Rakesh Bahuleyan) is an Indian film producer and owner of Universal Cinemas who mainly works in Malayalam cinema. He is the secretary of the Malayalam producers' association. He is credited as the first Malayalam mega serial Vamsham producer, penned by Sri. K Jayakumar.

He was born in Chadayamankalam, Kollam District, as the elder son of G Bahuleyan and P Leelabai.

== Filmography ==
Year	Title	Notes
2022	Aanu	
2021	Meri Awaaz Suno	
2019	Mera Naam Shaji	
2018	Dakini	
2017	Pullikkaran Staraa	
2017	Sakhavu	
2014	1 by Two	
2011	Makaramanju	
2007	Rathri Mazha	
2003	Njan Salperu Ramankutty	
2002	Malayali Mamanu Vanakkam	
2001	Vakkalathu Narayanankutty	

== Awards ==
Rathri Mazha – Producer B. Rakesh

- 2007 National Film Awards

Best Choreographer - Madu Gopinath, Saji Vakkom

- 2007 Kerala State Film Awards

Best Director - Lenin Rajendran Best Music Director - Ramesh Narayan Best Male Playback Singer- Srinivas, Best Female Playback Singer - Sujatha Mohan, Best Choreography - Madu Gopinath & Saji Vakkom,

- 2007 Kerala Film Critics Association Awards Best Female Playback Singer - Sujatha Mohan

2010. Kerala State Film Award for Second Best Film Makaramanju
