= The Secret of Women =

2025 film by Prajesh Sen

- Directed by: Prajesh Sen
- Written by: Prajesh Sen
- Screenplay by: Prajesh Sen
- Story by: Pradeep Kumar
- Produced by: Prajeshsen movie Club & 27 Degree Piscium production
- Starring: Niranjana Anoop; Aju Varghese; Srikant Murali; Midhun Venugopal; Suma Devi; Adeesh Damodaran; Zakir Manoli; Ankit Dsouza
- Cinematography: Lebison Gopi
- Edited by: Kannan Mohan
- Music by: Anil Krishna; Joshwa VJ
- Production company: Prajeshsen Movies Club
- Distributed by: Valluvnad Cinema company
- Release date: 31 January 2025
- Country: India
- Language: Malayalam

The Secret of Women is an Indian Malayalam-language emotional thriller drama film, written and directed by Prajesh Sen and produced by Prajesh Sen Movie Club. The film follows the story of two women and stars Niranjana Anoop, Aju Varghese, Srikant Murali, Midhun Venugopal, Suma Devi, Adheesh Damodaran, Zakir Manoli, and others.

Joshwa VJ, a newcomer to the industry, serves as the background score composer for the film, while Anil Krishna, another newcomer, is the music director. The film also features two songs, sung by singers Shahabaz Aman and Janaki Easwar.

Prajesh Sen Movie Club, the film's production company, is a new player in the Malayalam film industry. Recently, Prajesh Sen Movie Club launched the audio of "The Secret of Women" at Calicut on 17 March 2023. The event was a grand affair, featuring performances by renowned singers Shahabaz Aman and Janaki Easwar, who sang songs from the film.

== Cast ==
- Niranjana Anoop
- Aju Varghese
- Srikant Murali
- Midhun Venugopal
- Suma Devi
- Adheesh Damodaran
- Zaki Manoli
- Ankit Dsouza
- Eldo Benjamin
- Saja Cherai
- Babu Jose
- Lionel Orwel
- Pooja Mahesh
- Bineesh Vettukili
- Navin Nanda (Boby Voice)
- Jithendran
- Unni Cheruvathoor
- KiKi
