= Kerala Media Academy =

- Formation: 1979; 47 years ago as Kerala Press Academy
- Type: Government Media College
- Headquarters: Kochi, Kerala, India
- Chairman: R. S. Babu
- Website: keralamediaacademy.org

Kerala Media Academy (formerly Kerala Press Academy), is an academy of journalists in Kerala. The academy was established on 19 March 1979. It is a joint venture of the Government of Kerala, Kerala Union of Working Journalists and Indian Newspaper Society. The head office of Kerala Press Academy is located at Kakkanad, Kochi, Kerala.

Its primary aim is to foster and co-ordinate activities in the sphere of journalism. The Academy has set up a full-fledged institute, published books and monographs, organized seminars and workshops and instituted endowments and awards for promoting excellence in the field of journalism.. A new headquarters building for the Kerala Media academy at its campus in Kakkanad, Kochi, is in the pipeline.

== History ==
The organization was set up as a joint venture of the Government of Kerala, Kerala Union of Working Journalists and Indian Newspaper Society in March 1979. In 1984, it established the V.Karunakaran Nambiar Award for best reports published in Malayalam newspapers on human rights issues. Its headquarters at Kakkanad was inaugurated in May 1985. The following year it started a one-year "Post Graduate Diploma in Journalism" programme. In 1992 it established two more awards, the Dr. Mookanur Narayanan Award and the Chowara Parameswaran Award. In 1993, it started offering the "Post Graduate Diploma in Public Relations & Advertising" programme, another one-year programme. In 1996, it decided to award the Moffusil Reporter's Award annually in the field of journalism.

== Organisation and administration ==
The academy is administered by a General Council and an Executive Council composed of working journalists, media owners, and Government representatives constituted by the Government of Kerala.

== Notable alumni ==
- Anu Sivaraman, Judge, High court of Kerala
- Shahina K. K., Journalist, Winner International Press Freedom Award, 2023
- Vidhu Vincent, Award winning Malayalam Film Director
- Sithara S., Writer
- Shaiju Damodaran, T.V Commentator
- K. Rekha, Author, Journalist
- Jyothirmayi, Award winning Film Actress
- Mathukkutty, RJ, TV Host
