= Kothaiseri =

Village in Tamil Nadu, India

Kothaiseri is a village located in Tirunelveli District, Tamil Nadu, India.
