= Dug Dug =

2021 Indian film directed by Ritwik Pareek

- Directed by: Ritwik Pareek
- Written by: Ritwik Pareek
- Produced by: Ritwik Pareek; Ranjan Singh; Pareek Prerna
- Starring: Altaf Khan; Yogendra Singh Parmar; Durga Lal Saini; Gaurav Soni; Sarvesh Vyas
- Cinematography: Aditya Kumar
- Edited by: Bijith Bala
- Music by: Stuart DaCosta
- Production company: Bottle Rocket Pictures
- Distributed by: Flip Films
- Release dates: 9 September 2021 (Toronto); 8 May 2026 (India)
- Running time: 107 minutes
- Country: India
- Language: Hindi

Dug Dug is a 2021 Indian Hindi-language dark satirical comedy-mystery film written and directed by Ritwik Pareek in his directorial debut.

The film is produced by Ritwik Pareek, Ranjan Singh and Pareek Prerna under the banner of Bottle Rocket Pictures.

== Plot ==
The film is a socio-religious satire based on a real-life cultural phenomenon rooted in Rajasthan.

After Thakur Lal dies in a motorcycle crash on a highway, his moped, named Dug Dug, in the local language was taken to the police station.. Dug Dug would not stay there. Dug Dug suddenly returned to the spot of the crash and everyone began to search for a reason. This strange event turned a village into a place of mystery.

Following this event, some local residents attributed the occurrence to a divine origin. A religious group subsequently formed around the vehicle, attracting visitors from various locations.

The company also expands the business by adding new products, like alcohol and cigarettes.

The story is said to be based on the famous "Bullet Baba" temple near Jodhpur in Rajasthan that came up in late 1980s, related with a person called Om Singh Rathore, who died in identical circumstances, while going on his Royal Enfield Bullet, which crashed into a tree. Today, a full-fledged temple stands in the given site, where incidences similar to that presented in the film are said to have happened after the accident.

== Cast ==
- Altaf Khan as Thakur Sa
- Gaurav Soni as Pyare Lal
- Yogendra Singh Parmar as Badri
- Durga Lal Saini as Manfool
- Sarvesh Vyas as Police Inspector

== Music ==
The film includes the tracklist "Dug Dug XL" by singers Romy Music, Sawaal with singer and songwriter Ankur Tewari and the Original Background Score composed by the Salvage Audio Collective.

== Release ==
Dug Dug had its world premiere at the 2021 Toronto International Film Festival on 9 September 2021. It was theatrically released in India on 8 May 2026. The film was distributed by Flip Films.

== Reception ==
On the review aggregator website Rotten Tomatoes, 90% of 29 critics' reviews are positive, with an average rating of 7/10.

Renuka Vyavahare of The Times of India said that "Relevant, entertaining and thoughtfully executed, this is a smart social satire that deserves to be seen." Rahul Desai of The Hollywood Reporter India said that "The mundanities of reality don't cut it anymore, so fiction is the only refuge. And if a lie is repeated enough, it rearranges our perspective of the truth. How the fiction is co-opted, though, is in nobody's control; it's a tale as old as time." Anuj Kumar of The Hindu said that "Despite pacing issues and a lack of character depth, Dug Dug breathes life into the shrinking indie scene." Sukanya Verma of the Rediff said that "Just when Dug Dug appears to be caught up in musical montages, he throws a curveball. And a popular saying comes to mind: Na maano toh patthar maano toh bhagwan."
