= CIA activities in India =

Below is a list of speculated CIA activities in India.

== 1950s ==
The Cold War was marked by geopolitical tensions between the capitalist United States and the communist Soviet Union. Both superpowers sought to gain the allegiance of newly independent India, as its alignment could significantly influence the global balance of power. The U.S. and the Soviet Union employed their intelligence and espionage networks to win India over to their respective ideologies. In 1949, T.G. Sanjeev, the director of the Indian Intelligence Service, collaborated with the CIA to monitor communist China. Following China's annexation of Tibet, the CIA, under Indian supervision, supported Tibetan resistance fighters in 1950. The CIA facilitated the safe passage of the Dalai Lama to India in 1959. A secret CIA military base was established in Charbatia, Odisha, which was utilized for U-2 spy plane operations over China.

In 1955, a chartered Indian airliner, Kashmir Princess, was bombed. There is substantial evidence that the Kuomintang may have planted the bomb, attempting to assassinate Zhou Enlai, who had been expected on it. CIA involvement is much less clear, although some general claims are made.

In a 1971 face-to-face meeting in the Great Hall of the People in Beijing, Zhou directly asked Henry Kissinger about US involvement, whose response included the line "As I told the Prime Minister the last time, he vastly overestimates the competence of the CIA." Kissinger denied any US policy to kill him, and the two discussed the CIA at some length, in a manner unusual to find in US records.

In 1958, India's nuclear programs were assessed. Speculations are made by the intelligence experts that the CIA orchestrated the plane crash in which Homi Jehangir Bhabha, an Indian nuclear scientist, was killed.

During a period of anti-communist protests dubbed the Vimochana Samaram (English: "Liberation Struggle") against the First E. M. S. Namboodiripad ministry, which was led by Praja Socialist Party, Nair Service Society and others, saw the ovethrowing of the government. The communists claimed that the protests were funded by the CIA.

== 1960s ==
In 1965, Special National Intelligence Estimate 31-1-65 examined India's nuclear weapons policy for the remainder of the 1960s. In doing so, it examines India's technical capabilities, the pressures for a weapons program, and the opposition to a weapons program. A final section, "The Indian Decision," tries to assess India's decision calculus and notes that India might try to represent any underground test as being for peaceful purposes.

Journalist, conspiracy theorist, and holocaust denier Gregory Douglas claimed to have conducted a series of interviews with CIA officer Robert Crowley in 1993. Douglas claims that Crowley implied the CIA was responsible for assassinating Homi J. Bhabha. Douglas wrote that Crowley said that a bomb in the cargo section of the plane exploded mid-air, bringing down the commercial Boeing 707 airliner in Alps with few traces, claiming he described it as "an unfortunate accident".

When India formed its intelligence agency R&AW in 1968, RAW's first director, R.N. Kao, held meetings with his CIA counterparts in the U.S., as well as the United Kingdom's MI6 and the Soviet Union KGB. Much of the liaison was essentially political in character — what is today known as 'back channel diplomacy' — but R&AW's special operations and SIGINT/IMINT unit, the Aviation Research Centre, received technical assistance from the U.S. in return for information on China.

== 1970s ==
India's first nuclear test (codenamed Operation Smiling Buddha) on May 18, 1974 was a surprise to the international intelligence community, although the overall nuclear program and incentives to build a bomb had been discussed.

India conducted an underground nuclear test at a site in the desert at Pokhran - making it the world's seventh nuclear power. As CIA analysts had previously suggested, India claimed the test was for peaceful purposes. This Top Secret Codeword item in the Central Intelligence Bulletin relays press reporting and public statements by officials of other governments, including Pakistan, and contains analysts assessments of the implications for China.

== 1980s ==
Sheel Bhadra Yagee claimed that the CIA orchestrated the Sikh uprising which later led to Indira Gandhi assassination by her Sikh body guards.

In 1985, according to Frontline magazine, R&AW counter-intelligence obtained a confession, from a field officer in Chennai to admit that he had passed on sensitive information to the CIA and Sri Lankan intelligence. R&AW confronted him with footage showing him making contact with a U.S. national on a beach in Chennai and at a resort in Kerala. R&AW had sought to tighten in-house security after the public fracas that broke out in the wake of the scandal. The Chennai case was a particular embarrassment because it came hot on the heels of another spy scandal involving French and Polish intelligence.

In 1987, when the Indian Peace Keeping Force (IPKF) was in Sri Lanka during the Sri Lankan Civil War, Paranthan Rajan came into contact with R&AW officials. He came to Indian intelligence officials’ attention when he formed a political group, Tamileela Iykkia Viduthalai Munnani. Given his background, observers feel Rajan’s alliance with Karuna might be R&AW’s handiwork.

== 1990s ==
In 1992, the US State Department threatened to impose economic sanctions on India after it refused permission for US sleuths to go on an aerial-photography mission along the Sino-Indian border.

== 2000s ==
India's ballistic missile capabilities were addressed in a National Intelligence Estimate, which concluded that New Delhi believes that a nuclear-capable missile delivery option is necessary to deter Pakistani first use of nuclear weapons and thereby preserve the option to wage limited conventional war in response to Pakistani provocations in Kashmir or elsewhere. Nuclear weapons also serve as a hedge against a confrontation with China. New Delhi views the development, not just the possession, of nuclear-capable ballistic missiles as the symbols of a world power and an important component of self-reliance.

Until recently, only R&AW was authorised to have contacts with foreign intelligence agencies — and the job was restricted to a select few within its ranks. Under the National Democratic Alliance coalition government, R&AW, IB, and DIA could interact with counterpart organizations in other countries. Former Deputy Prime Minister L.K. Advani, for example, met the heads of the CIA and Israel's Mossad along with Intelligence Bureau staff. Brajesh Mishra, former Principal Secretary to Prime Minister Atal Bihari Vajpayee, is known to have had direct contact with the head of Pakistan's Inter-Services Intelligence as well. While meetings in themselves are not inappropriate, they can lead to the breakdown of protocols - for example, that intelligence officers will meet a foreign contact only in teams of two - and eventual penetration. There is little oversight of this process, which has had the unexpected consequence that "hundreds of Indian agents have been exposed, the term professionals use to describe individuals whose real jobs are known to foreign intelligence organisations.

Rabinder Singh has been described, in Indian media, as a CIA asset inside the Research and Analysis Wing (R&AW), the national intelligence service. It is not clear if he is a member of a larger clandestine HUMINT network. The suggestion has already been made by a number of well-placed observers that he had acted as a conduit or cutout for a number of highly placed US 'assets' operating deep within the Indian intelligence community, the military and scientific centres working on nuclear and missile development, and others inside the political establishment.

The issue also involved problems with the Intelligence Bureau, the domestic security agency, and an overall concern with trust of security officers.

In 2002, Singh visited the US under a liaison initiative based on counter-terror, teaching skills for hostage negotiation and dealing with hijackers. Singh, however, is a Southeast Asia analyst not working on terror issues.

In 2002, the last year for which figures are available, the U.S. hosted 80 courses for officers from India, along with 17 other countries in Asia and Africa. "Intelligence cooperation and liaison have always been chaotic," says former R&AW officer and analyst B. Raman, "but we cannot afford complacency any more."

Singh disappeared from India in May 2004, and applied for asylum in the US. Frontline, an Indian newsmagazine, described him as "Joint Secretary handling South-East Asia" for R&AW. He came to R&AW as an Indian Army major, who had "served with distinction in Amritsar during Operation Bluestar, the counter-terrorist assault on the Golden Temple in 1984. At some point after this, he again attracted the attention of his superiors, this time by procuring classified U.S. government documentation.

"Rabinder Singh's source seems to have been one of his relatives, a U.S. citizen who has worked for over two decades with the United States Agency for International Development (USAID). Rabinder Singh's relative is alleged to have visited India regularly on official work, sometimes staying at his residence. This relationship, RAW investigators claim, enabled Rabinder Singh to pass on documents with only a minimal risk of exposure.

"In the early 1980s, the son of then R&AW chief N. Narasimhan left the U.S. after efforts were made to approach the spy chief through him. Narasimhan's son had been denied a visa extension, and was offered its renewal in return for his cooperation with the U.S.' intelligence services. "Not all," says a senior R&AW officer, "would respond with such probity."

Charges against Singh were filed in 2006. The RAW charges said that they had located Singh in New Jersey and the process should start to seek his extradition. “Now, we will be moving to extradite Singh from the US,” stated the complaint. The Home Ministry had earlier invoked the National Security Act and issued orders to attach Singh’s property.

After losing a first petition for asylum in the US, Singh won on appeal.
