= Shaiju Damodaran =

Indian sports commentator and journalist

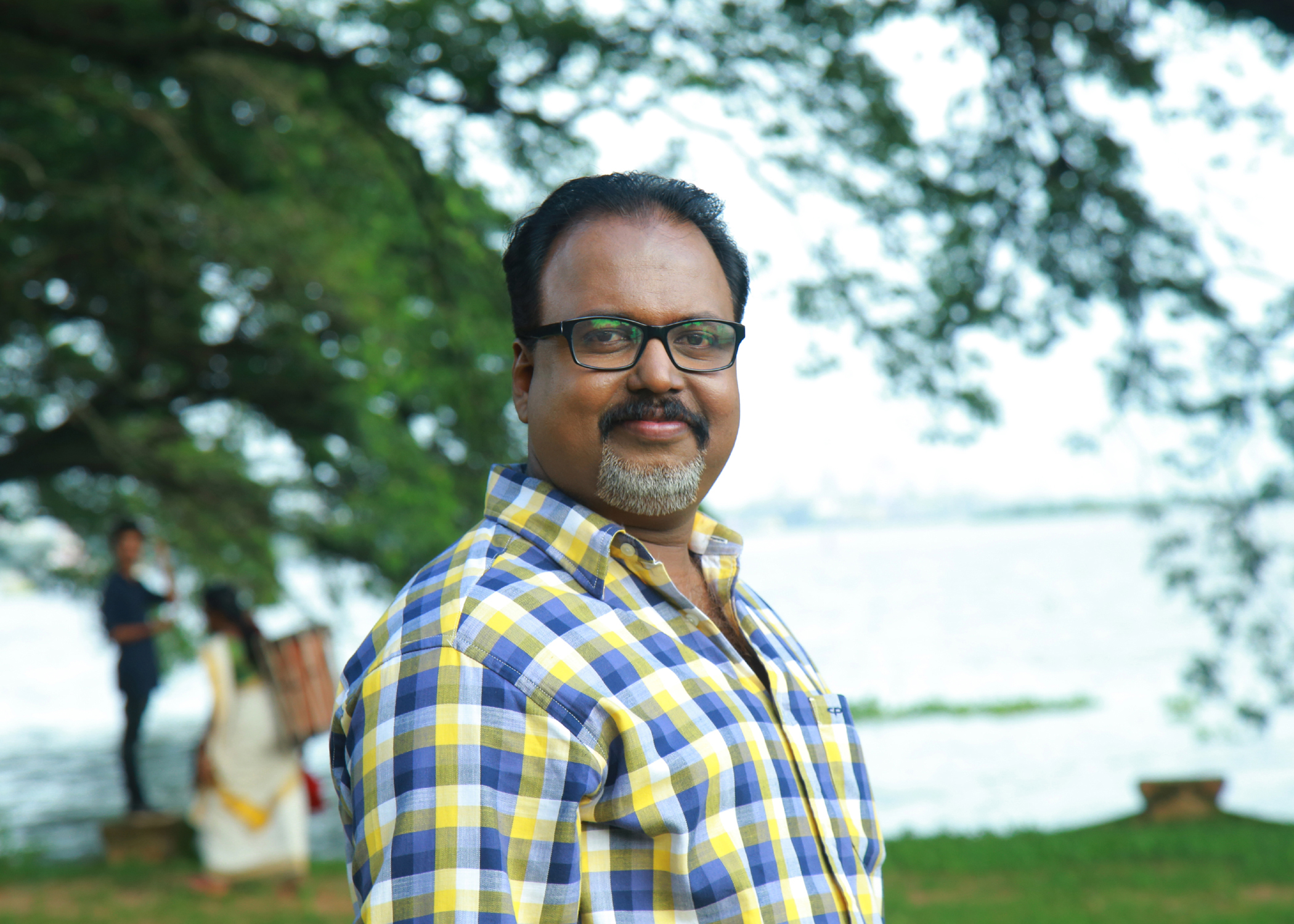
- Shaiju in March 2016
- Born: 7 February 1973 (age 53); Aroor, Alappuzha, Kerala, India
- Education: The Cochin College, Kochi; St. Paul's College, Kalamassery; Kerala Media Academy, Kochi
- Occupations: Journalist; TV commentator; TV presenter
- Spouse: Asha Shaiju
- Children: 2

Shaiju Damodaran (born 7 February 1973) is an Indian sports commentator, sports journalist and columnist who, as of 2022, is the leading Malayalam commentator for Star network (Malayalam) on their Indian Super League (ISL) coverage. As of November 2022, he has commentated on more than 500 ISL games, which is the highest by any commentators in any language in the ISL.

== Early life and career ==
Shaiju Damodaran is the son of A. I. Damodaran and Lalitha Damodaran. He attended high school at Ochanthuruth and completed his pre-degree at The Cochin College, Kochi, then studied for a Bachelor's degree in economics at St. Paul's College, Kalamassery. He later completed a Post-Graduate Diploma in journalism and mass communication at Kerala Media Academy, Kochi.

In 1995, Shaiju started working as a journalist at Mathrubhumi in Kochi, specializing in cricket and football, and later became a senior sub-editor. After working for 20 years, he resigned from Mathrubhumi to work as a special correspondent for Kochi-based firm Mangalam Publications in 2015. As of January 2021, Shaiju works as a sports journalist; he has covered 10 Santosh Trophy National Football Championships, more than 400 ISL games, national and international cricket matches including the Ranji Trophy, Deodhar Trophy and Duleep Trophy. He has also covered all of the One Day International cricket games in Kochi.

== Commentary career ==
Shaiju started his career as a sports commentator in 2012, covering the 2012 Celebrity Cricket League (CCL) season, which he covered for the next two seasons. He was chosen as the leading commentator in Malayalam for the inaugural season of the ISL. Ahead of the ICC Cricket World Cup 2015, Star Network decided to include Malayalam commentary and Shaiju was engaged as the leading commentator. In 2017, he became the first person to complete 200 matches as an ISL commentator.

In the same year, he commentated for the 2017 ICC Champions Trophy's final between India and Pakistan. In 2018, Sony ESPN engaged Shaiju as the leading Malayalam commentator for the FIFA World Cup in Russia; it was the first Malayalam commentary of a FIFA World Cup. During the tournament, Shaiju's commentary of Cristiano Ronaldo’s 87th-minute free-kick goal against Spain captured the attention of football fans across the globe and became viral on social media.

In January 2019, Shaiju later did the Malayalam commentary for the 2019 AFC Asian Cup, which was held in the UAE. He also commentated for India's numerous friendly football games. In December 2020, he recreated the commentary for Diego Maradona's 'Goal of the Century' in the 1986 FIFA World Cup in Malayalam by the request of Victor Hugo Morales, and had aired in Argentina through Radio AM 750.

== Commentary style ==
Shaiju's commentary style consists of energetic phrases peppered with aberrant uses and one-liners. He usually intersperses his commentary with famous dialogue from movies. Shaiju has said his reaction is automatic and he uses a mix of language in his commentary, saying; "It comes naturally to me when the action calls for it. It’s an emotional display rather than a verbal expression. I think people like it".

Fascinated with Shaiju's commentary on Ronaldo's free-kick goal, Mahindra Group executive chairman Anand Mahindra tweeted:

Ok that’s it. I’m switching to this channel with commentary in Malayalam. No, I don’t understand the language but I don’t need to—these guys are so pumped up they make the English & Hindi commentators sound tame!

== Personal life ==
Shaiju is married to Asha and the couple lives in Kaloor, Kochi, with their children Abhinov and Adhinov.
