= Subbiah Arunan =

Indian scientist and Padma Shri awardee

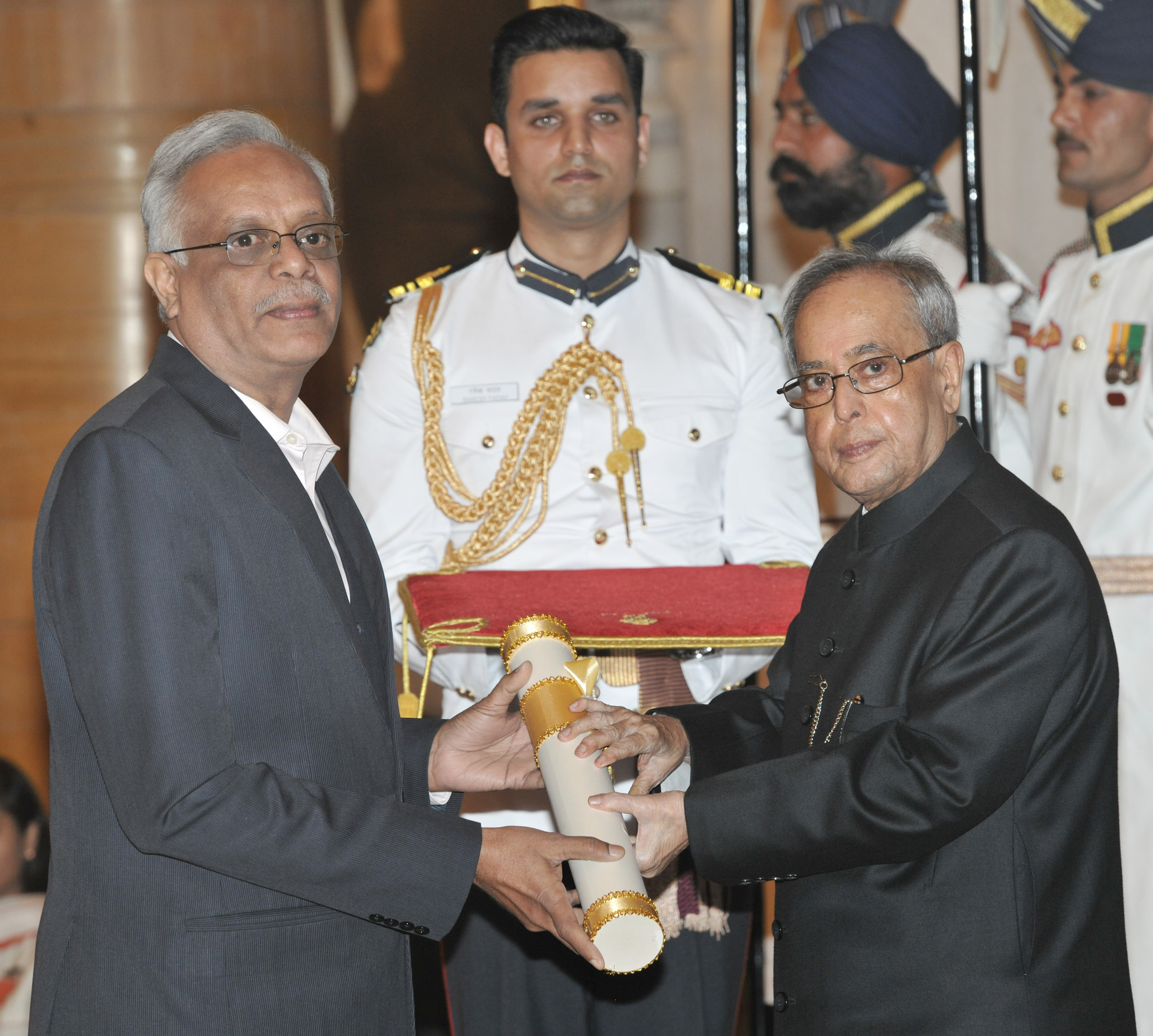
- Arunan receiving the Padma Shri award from the President of India, Pranab Mukherjee, April 2015.
- Born: Kothaiseri, Tirunelveli, Tamil Nadu, India
- Known for: Mars Orbiter Mission
- Father: Subbiah
- Relatives: Nambi Narayanan (father-in-law)
- Awards: Padma Shri
- Scientific career
- Fields: Mechanical Engineering and Space research
- Workplaces: VSSC

Subbiah Arunan is an Indian scientist and Padma Shri awardee, known for his role in the Mars Orbiter Mission of Indian Space Research Organisation (ISRO). He finished his schooling in St. Mary's Higher Secondary School, Vikramasingapuram in Tirunelveli Dist. He was born in Kothaiseri, Tirunelveli district, Tamil Nadu and completed his Mechanical engineering from Coimbatore Institute of Technology.

In 1984, he started his career in Vikram Sarabhai Space Centre. He is the project director of Mars Orbiter Mission in 2013. He is married to Geetha Arunan, the daughter of fellow ISRO scientist Nambi Narayanan.
