= Ormakalude Bhramanapadham =

Autobiography of Nambi Narayanan

- Autobiography of Nambi Narayanan
- Author: Nambi Narayanan, Prajesh Sen
- Original title: ഓർമകളുടെ ഭ്രമണപഥം
- Cover artist: Lebison Gopi
- Language: Malayalam
- Genre: Autobiography
- Published: 26 October 2017
- Publisher: Current Books, Thrissur
- Publication place: India
- Awards: Best Seller in Malayalam 2018

Ormakalude Bhramanapadham (Malayalam: ഓർമകളുടെ ഭ്രമണപഥം) is the autobiography of Nambi Narayanan, former Indian Space Research Organisation (ISRO) scientist and the Padma Bhushan awardee. After his education at Princeton University in chemical rocket propulsion he was invited by United States to join NASA, but he decided to serve the nation and joined ISRO. He came to India with expertise in liquid propulsion at a time when Indian rocketry was still solely dependent on solid propellants.

He was closely associated with Vikram Sarabhai, APJ, Satish Dhawan and U. R. Rao. As a senior official at the Indian Space Research Organisation (ISRO), he was in-charge of the cryogenics division. In 1994, he was falsely charged with espionage and arrested.

Written by journalist turned filmmaker Prajesh Sen, the book also presents the story of Nambi Narayanan’s life. The book untangles the scientific quest and his preliminary efforts in emerging the country's homegrown cryogenic technology that drives India's space technology today.

== The espionage case in 1994 ==
The book Ormakalude bhramanapadham probes into the ISRO spy case. It was purported that Nambi Narayanan and other scientists had sold defense secrets to two Maldivian agents. In 1996, the CBI dismissed the case, and in 1998 the Supreme Court acquitted Nambi Narayanan and others.

== Publication ==
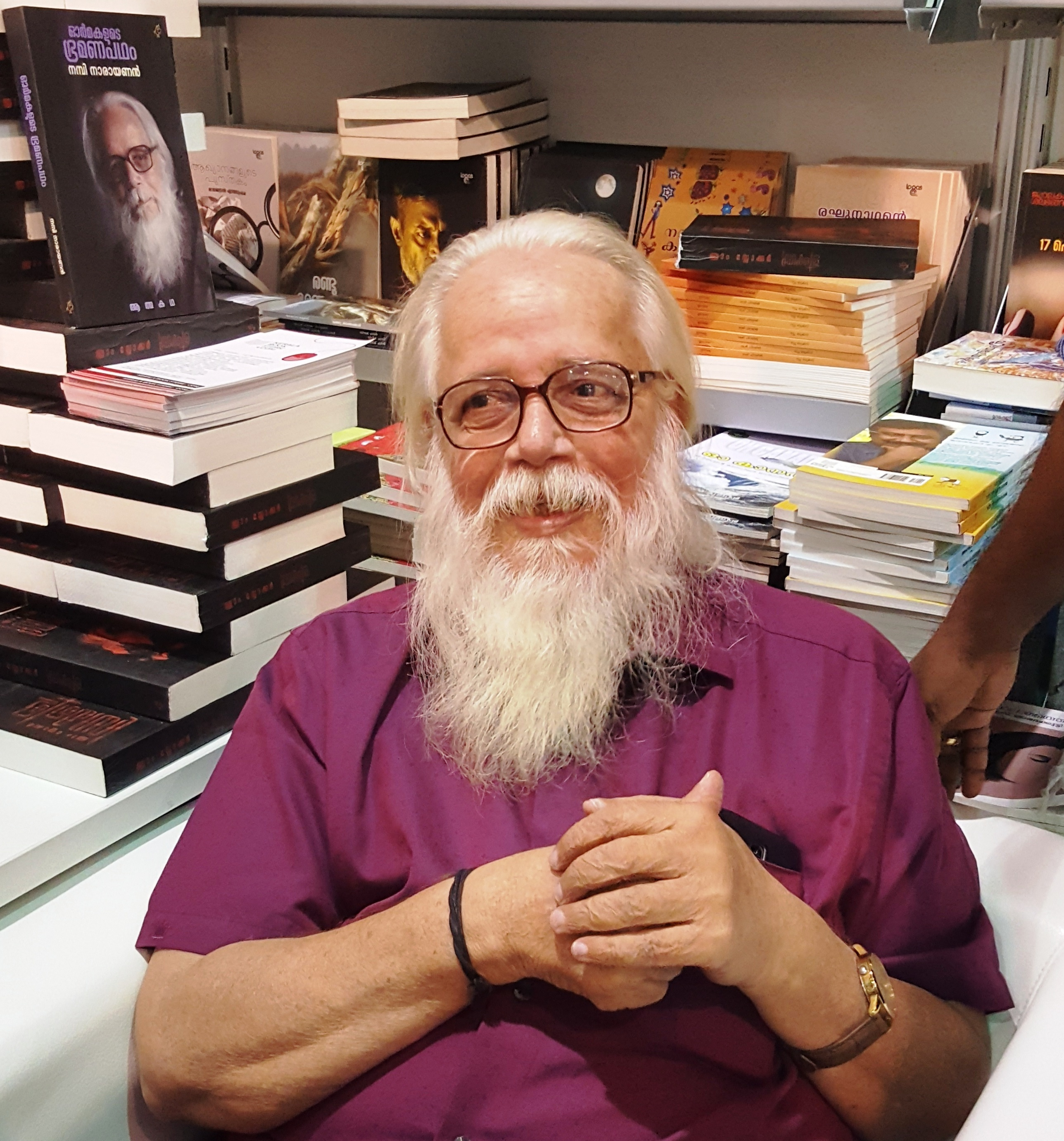
Nambi Narayanan during book launch tour, 2017

It was published by Current Books Thrissur. The book was released by Shashi Tharoor on 26 October 2017. In his speech, Shashi Tharoor mentioned that the "Nation owes an apology to Nambi Narayanan" “He chose to work for ISRO though he was invited by NASA after his education at Princeton University. Maybe he would have risen to the post of ISRO chairman for his meritorious service, but he now survives to reveal a moving tale which is a warning to the dedicated few,” Tharoor said

The preface for this book was written by T. N. Seshan.

== English translation ==
The book was published in English by the name "The orbit of memories" in the end of 2018.
