= A. E. Muthunayagam =

Indian space scientist (born 1939)

A.E. Muthunayagam
- Born: Abraham .E. Muthunayagam; 11 January 1939 (age 87); Nagercoil, India
- Education: Scott Christian College; University of Madras; Indian Institute of Science; Purdue University; University of Kerala
- Known for: Indian Space program
- Awards: National Award for Ocean Science (27 July 2007); Dr. V. M Ghatage Award by ASI (1989)
- Scientific career
- Fields: Space scientist
- Workplaces: Indian Space Research Organisation; Liquid Propulsion Systems Centre; Department of Oceanography; IIT, Madras; Kerala State Council for Science Technology and Environment; Karunya University; Noorul Islam University, Kumarakovil

Dr. A. E. Muthunayagam (born on 11 January 1939) is a leading space scientist in the Indian Space Research Organisation and the chief architect of rocket propulsion in India. He was responsible for the creation of Liquid Propulsion Systems Centre. For his significant contributions to the development of Propulsion Technology in India, he is known as the father of propulsion technology in India's space program. He chose to return to India from the National Aeronautics and Space Administration for the development of propulsion technology in the Indian Space Research Organisation. He established the Test Stands and Assembly and Integration Facilities in Liquid Propulsion Systems Centre, Mahendragiri for testing liquid stages of the Polar Satellite Launch Vehicle and the Geosynchronous Satellite Launch Vehicle. He is the founder director of Liquid Propulsion Systems Centre] and held the position from 30 November 1985 to 14 April 1994. He held the secretary position in the Department of Ocean Development. He worked as an executive vice-president in Kerala State Council for Science Technology and Environment. He worked as Chairman of the Board of Governors of the Indian Institute of Technology, Chennai from 2005 to 2008. He was appointed under Section 11 of the IIT Act of 1961, which lays down the composition of the Board of Governors for each of the seven Indian Institutes of Technology across India

== Education ==
He obtained his bachelor of engineering (mechanical) degree from the University of Madras in 1960 with first class honors. His master's degree was completed at Indian Institute of Science, Bangalore in 1962 with distinction. He obtained his Doctorate from the school of Mechanical Engineering in Purdue University, USA in 1965. He also completed his law degree in the University of Kerala in 1975.

== Career in the Indian Space Research Organisation ==
- Head, Propulsion Engineering Division, SSTC
- Head, Mechanical Engineering Division, SSTC
- Project Leader
  - Rohini 125 Rocket Project
  - Rohini Multi-stage Rocket Project
  - Strip Wound Motor Project
- Project Engineer and Chairman, Board of Administration, Static Test & Evaluation Complex at Sriharikotta, Andhra Pradesh
- Member of Board of Management, Sriharikotta centre
- Director, Propulsion Group, VSSC
- Project Manager of Vikas Project (Technology Collaboration with French Aeronautical Company)
- Chairman, Rocket Propulsion Board
- Convener, the Indian Space Research Organisation-Centre national d'études spatiales (France) Launcher Working Group
- Adviser, Static Test Facilities of the Indian Space Research Organisation
- Programme Director, Auxiliary Propulsion Systems Unit of the Indian Space Research Organisation
- Director, Liquid Propulsion Projects
- Chairman, LPP Management Board
- Chairman, SRC on SLV-3 Rocket Motors
- Chairman, Mission Readiness Review, ASLV D1 & D2 Launch

== Other official positions ==
He was a member of Science and Technology Committee constituted by the Government of Kerala, Review Committee for Birla Institute of Technology, Ranchi (Constituted by the Ministry of Social welfare, Government of India) and Scientific Advisory committee on propulsion, National Aeronautical Lab, Bangalore.

== International and intergovernmental organizations ==
- Chairman of Regional Committee of Inter-governmental Oceanographic Commission for the Central Indian Ocean (1996–2001)
- Chairman, Commission for the Conservation of Antarctic Marine Living Resources (1998–2000)
- Vice chairman of Intergovernmental Oceanographic Commission for two years (1996–1998)

== Academic contributions ==
He was coordinator for establishing ancillary Industrial units around the Space Centre in 1970, referee to review papers for International Journal of Heat and Mass Transfer, Pergamon Press, New York City and examiner of post-graduate degree in mechanical engineering, for Kerala University, California University, Birla Institute of Technology, and the Indian Institute of Technology in Madras.

== Professional societies ==
- Fellow, Astronautical Society of India
- Fellow, Aeronautical Society of India
- Fellow, Indian National Academy of Engineering
- Foreign Member of Academy of Cosmonautics, Moscow, Russia
- Fellow, Institution of Engineers (India)
