= List of awards and nominations received by Sai Pallavi =

List of accolades received by Sai Pallavi
- Pallavi at 70th Filmfare Awards South
Accolades
Award	Won	Nominated
Kalaimamani Awards	1	N/A
Tamil Nadu State Film Awards	1	1
Filmfare Awards South	7	11
South Indian International Movie Awards	3	9
Ananda Vikatan Cinema Awards	2	3
Asianet Film Awards	2	2
Asiavision Awards	1	1
Chennai International Film Festival	2	2
Critics' Choice Film Awards	3	3
CPC Cine Awards	1	1
IBNLive Movie Awards	1	1
Indian Film Festival of Melbourne	1	1
Norway Tamil Film Festival Awards	1	1
Vanitha Film Awards	1	1
Other awards	7	15
- Total number of awards and nominations (Note: Awards in certain categories do not have prior nominations and only winners are announced by the jury. For simplification and to avoid errors, each award in this list has been presumed to have had a prior nomination.)
Totals	34	54
- References

Sai Pallavi is an Indian actress and dancer who primarily works in Tamil, Telugu and Malayalam films. She is the recipient of numerous accolades, including seven Filmfare Awards South and three South Indian International Movie Awards. Pallavi has won Filmfare Award for Best Female Debut – South for Premam (2015), Filmfare Award for Best Actress – Telugu for Fidaa (2017) and Love Story (2021), Filmfare Critics Award for Best Actress – Telugu for Shyam Singha Roy (2021) and Virata Parvam (2022), and Filmfare Award for Best Actress – Tamil for Gargi (2022) and Amaran (2024) respectively. She won Tamil Nadu State Film Awards - Best Actress (2022) for Gargi. She was included by Forbes magazine in their India's 30 Under 30 list in 2020. She was honoured with Kalaimamani for the year 2021 by the Government of Tamil Nadu.

== Ananda Vikatan Cinema Awards ==
Pallavi has won two Ananda Vikatan Cinema Awards from three nominations.

Year	Category	Film	Result	Ref.
2019	Best Actress	Maari 2	Nominated	
2023	Best Actress	Gargi	Won	
2025	Best Actress	Amaran	Won	

== Asianet Film Awards ==
Pallavi has won two Asianet Film Awards from two nominations.

Year	Category	Film	Result	Ref.
2016	Special Jury Award	Premam	Won	
2017	Most Popular Actress	Kali	Won	

== Asiavision Awards ==
Pallavi has won one Asiavision Awards.

Year	Category	Film	Result	Ref.
2015	New Sensational Actor – Female	Premam	Won	

== Chennai International Film Festival ==
Pallavi has won two Chennai International Film Festival award.

Year	Category	Film	Result	Ref.
2022	Best Actor – Female	Gargi	Won	
2024	Best Actor – Female	Amaran	Won	

== Critics' Choice Film Awards ==
Year	Category	Film	Result	Ref.
2021	Best Supporting Actor – Female	Paava Kadhaigal	Won	
2023	Best Actor – Female	Gargi	Won	
2023	Gender Sensitivity Award	Gargi	Won	

== CPC Cine Awards ==
Pallavi has won one CPC Cine Awards.

Year	Category	Film	Result	Ref.
2016	Best Actress	Kali	Won	

== Filmfare Awards South ==
Pallavi has won seven Filmfare Awards South from eleven nominations. Sai is a two-time winner of both Best Actress & Best Actress (Critics) in Telugu, also a Best Actress in Tamil and Best Female Debut in Malayalam.

=== Malayalam ===
Year	Category	Film	Result	Ref.
2016	Best Female Debut – South	Premam	Won	
2017	Best Actress – Malayalam	Kali	Nominated	

=== Tamil ===
Year	Category	Film	Result	Ref.
2018	Best Actress – Tamil	Maari 2	Nominated	
2023	Best Actress – Tamil	Gargi	Won	
2024	Best Actress – Tamil	Amaran	Won	

=== Telugu ===
Year	Category	Film	Result	Ref.
2018	Best Actress – Telugu	Fidaa	Won	
2022	Best Actress – Telugu	Love Story	Won	
2022	Best Actress – Telugu	Shyam Singha Roy	Nominated	
2022	Critics Best Actress – Telugu	Shyam Singha Roy	Won	
2023	Critics Best Actress – Telugu	Virata Parvam	Won	
2023	Best Actress – Telugu	Virata Parvam	Nominated	

== IBNLive Movie Awards ==
Year	Category	Film	Result	Ref.
2016	Best Debut Female – South	Premam	Won	

== Indian Film Festival of Melbourne ==
Pallavi has received one Indian Film Festival of Melbourne nomination.

Year	Category	Film	Result	Ref.
2023	Best Actor - Female	Gargi	Nominated	

== Norway Tamil Film Festival Awards ==
Pallavi has won one Norway Tamil Film Festival Awards.

Year	Category	Film	Result	Ref.
2023	Best Actress	Gargi	Won	

== South Indian International Movie Awards ==
Pallavi has won five South Indian International Movie Awards from nine nominations.

=== Malayalam ===
Year	Category	Film	Result	Ref.
2016	Best Female Debut – Malayalam	Premam	Won	
2017	Best Actress – Malayalam	Kali	Nominated	

=== Telugu ===
Year	Category	Film	Result	Ref.
2018	Best Actress – Telugu	Fidaa	Nominated	
2022	Best Actress – Telugu	Love Story	Nominated	
2022	Best Actress – Telugu	Shyam Singha Roy	Nominated	
2022	Entertainer Of The Year - (Female)	Shyam Singha Roy	Won	
2022	Entertainer Of The Year - (Female)	Love Story	Won	

=== Tamil ===
Year	Category	Film	Result	Ref.
2020	Best Supporting Actress – Tamil	Paava Kadhaigal	Nominated	
2023	Best Actress – Tamil	Gargi	Won	
2025	Best Actress – Tamil	Amaran	Won	

== Tamil Nadu State Film Awards ==
Year	Category	Film	Result	Ref.
2022	Best Actress	Gargi	Won	

== Vanitha Film Awards ==
Pallavi has won one Vanitha Film Awards.

Year	Category	Film	Result	Ref.
2016	Best Debut - Actress	Premam	Won	

== Zee Telugu Golden Awards ==
Year	Category	Film	Result	Ref.
2017	Entertainer of the Year (Female)	Fidaa	Nominated	

== Other awards ==
=== Bollywood Life - South Movies Award ===
Year	Category	Film	Result	Ref.
2022	Best Supporting Actor – Female	Shyam Singha Roy	Nominated	
2022	Best Actress	Love Story	Nominated	
2023	Best Actress	Gargi	Nominated	
2023	Best Actress	Virata Parvam	Nominated	

=== Chittara Star Awards ===
The Chittara Star Awards are an annual event that honors achievements in Kannada cinema, television, and fashion. Pallavi has received one Chittara Star Awards nomination.

Year	Category	Result	Ref.
2025	South Icon – Female	Nominated	

=== Indian Film Institute ===
Year	Category	Film	Result	Ref.
2023	Best Actor – Female	Gargi	Won	

=== JFW Digital Awards ===
The JFW Movie Awards are an annual event that recognized women's achievements in various roles within the Malayalam and Tamil film industry.

Year	Category	Result	Ref.
2017	New Sensational Actress – South	Won	
2025	Best Actress – Tamil for Amaran	Nominated	

=== SPOTT Awards ===
Year	Category	Film	Result	Ref.
2021	Performance in a Leading Role – Female	Paava Kadhaigal	Nominated	

=== Toronto Tamil Film Festival ===
Year	Category	Film	Result	Ref.
2023	Jury Award for Best Actress	Gargi	Won	

=== Behindwoods Gold Medals ===
Year	Category	Film	Ref.
2017	Best Actress – Malayalam	Kali	
2019	Best Actress Critics Choice – Malayalam	Athiran	
2022	Best Actress in a leading role – Telugu	Love Story & Shyam Singha Roy	

== Other recognitions ==
- 2016: Rediff.com placed her second in its "Top 5 Malayalam Actresses" list.
- 2020: Pallavi became the only actress to feature in Forbes India's 30 under 30 list.
- 2021: She was placed 20th in Forbes India's most influential stars on Instagram in South cinema.

=== Times of India ===
Year	Category	Result	Ref.
2020	Hyderabad Times Most Desirable Woman 2019	#23	
2020	Chennai Times Most Desirable Woman 2019	#22	
2020	Kochi Times Most Desirable Woman 2019	#9	
2021	Hyderabad Times Most Desirable Woman 2020	#23	
2021	Chennai Times Most Desirable Woman 2020	#24	

== Honours ==
Year	Category	Ref.
2021	Kalaimamani Award by Tamil Nadu Government	

== See also ==
- Sai Pallavi
