= Love Story (soundtrack) =

2021 soundtrack album by Pawan Ch

Soundtrack album by Pawan Ch
- Released: 22 September 2021
- Recorded: 2020–2021
- Genre: Feature film soundtrack
- Length: 20:53
- Language: Telugu
- Label: Aditya Music
- Producer: Pawan Ch
External audio
- Audio Jukebox on YouTube

Singles from Love Story
- 1. "Ay Pilla" Released: 11 March 2020; 2. "Nee Chitram Choosi" Released: 14 February 2021; 3. "Saranga Dariya" Released: 28 February 2021; 4. "Evo Evo Kalale" Released: 25 March 2021

Love Story is the soundtrack album composed by Pawan Ch for the 2021 Indian Telugu-language film of the same name featuring Naga Chaitanya and Sai Pallavi in lead roles, directed by Sekhar Kammula. The album consists of five songs (along with an additional song) with Suddala Ashok Teja, Bhaskarabhatla, Roll Rida, Chaithanya Pingali and Mittapalli Surender penning the lyrics. The soundtrack album was released on 22 September 2021 through Aditya Music label. Kartik Srinivasan of Film Companion added the song "Evo Evo Kalale" in his list of Top 10 Telugu songs of 2021.

== Background and development ==
Pawan Ch, a student of A. R. Rahman's music institution KM Music Conservatory, was chosen to compose the film's soundtrack and score. The album marks his debut as a composer in a feature film. About his opportunity to work in the film, Pawan told that "I was rejected for Fidaa and another film of his too. Sekhar sir is very demanding, he always wants something more and better. It was with a rough version of Ay Pilla that helped me bag Love Story. He later tested me for several song situations. I think I was responding well and only then, he gave me the actual song situation for this number, Evo Evo Kalale. With most of the songs in the film, we created multiple versions and improvised them with time".

== Release ==
A preview of the first single track titled "Ay Pilla" was released on 14 February 2020, to coincide with Valentine's Day and the full lyrical version of the song on 11 March 2020. The song had lyrics written by Chaitanya Pingali and was sung by Haricharan with Nakul Abhyankar, Hiral Viradia singing additional vocals. The lyric video of the song crossed 10 million views in YouTube as of January 2021.

Less than a year after its first single being released, the second song "Nee Chitram Choosi" written by Mittapalli Surender and sung by Anurag Kulkarni was released on Valentine's Day, 14 February 2021. On 28 February 2021, the third song "Saranga Dariya" featuring vocals by Mangli and lyrics by Suddala Ashok Teja was released. The lyrical song received praise for Sai Pallavi's dance choreography and the vocals by Mangli adding a "perfect Telangana nativity to the folk number". The song had crossed more than 100 million views upon release. On 25 March 2021, Mahesh Babu unveiled the fourth song "Evo Evo Kalale" featuring vocals by Jonita Gandhi and Nakul Abhyankar and written by Bhaskarabhatla Ravikumar. The full album featuring five tracks was unveiled on the occasion of Vinayaka Chaviti (10 September 2021). An additional song "Mutyala Chemma Chekka" which is a remix from the 1964 film Bobbili Yuddham was released after the film's release. The official background score track list was released on 11 January 2022.

=== Marketing ===
To promote the soundtrack's success, a musical event titled Love Story Unplugged was held on 20 September 2021, by Pawan and his music team, at the Yousufguda Police Grounds in Hyderabad.

== Reception ==
J Jagannath of Business Standard felt that his music makes the movie watchable and also wrote: "Pawan Ch, an alumnus of A R Rahman's KM Music Conservatory, makes a barnstorming musical debut with Love Story. His sense of melody, the trademark of a Kammula movie, is spot on. At least three tracks are instant chartbusters and the background music is spellbindingly inventive considering how much of an emotional movie it is. The song 'Evo Evo Kalale' has been shot like a fevered dream and its brilliance is to be seen on the big screen to be believed." Writing for Idlebrain, Jeevi stated that "Songs and background music by Pawan Ch is the highlight of the film among the technical departments". He further wrote: "Background music helps in enhancing the emotions/mood of the scenes. The audiences who loved the youtube song of Saranga Dariya are in for a little disappointment (unlike Vachinde song from Fidaa) as you can’t completely enjoy the song as it comes in a tense moment of the film and is edited in a way to accommodate story-related scenes in between".

The Hans India wrote. "Pawan Ch's music is a major advantage of the film. Already, the songs have become chartbusters and now, he scored brownie points with the background score. Vijay C Kumar's cinematography is beautiful". Another critic, of Firstpost, too praised Pawan's work and felt that "Pawan Ch’s music brings the story alive. Especially the background score. It mimics the heartbeats of a character in a tense moment, and it complements the spring in the hero’s steps when he is happy, and it does all this without bringing much attention to itself". 123telugu in their review, wrote that "The music by Pawan CH is amazing and his BGM was even more haunting. The songs drive the narrative and are placed perfectly in the second half. Choreography for Saranga Dariya is just amazing".

== Additional track listing ==
Original Motion Picture Track List
No.	Title	Lyrics	Singer(s)	Length
1.	"Ay Pilla"	Chaithanya Pingali	Haricharan	4:13
2.	"Nee Chitram Choosi"	Mittapalli Surender	Anurag Kulkarni	4:22
3.	"Saranga Dariya"	Suddala Ashok Teja	Mangli	3:50
4.	"Evo Evo Kalale"	Bhaskarabhatla Ravi Kumar	Jonita Gandhi, Nakul Abhyankar	4:30
5.	"Winner Winner Bro"	Roll Rida	Abhijith Rao, Roll Rida	3:58
Total length:				20:53

All lyrics are written by Aarudhra.

Additional soundtrack
No.	Title	Singer(s)	Length
1.	"Mutyala Chemma Chakka Remix"	Rakshita Suresh	1:33
Total length:			22:36

Rakshita Suresh

== Controversy ==
In March 2021, singer Komali Tatte, who gathered and performed the folk song "Saranga Dariya" on a television show years before the release of its theatrical version, stated that she wasn't credited in the lyrical video as promised. Director Kammula responded that Komala will be credited and compensated for the song.
