= Tamil Nadu State Film Award for Best Actress =

Indian film award

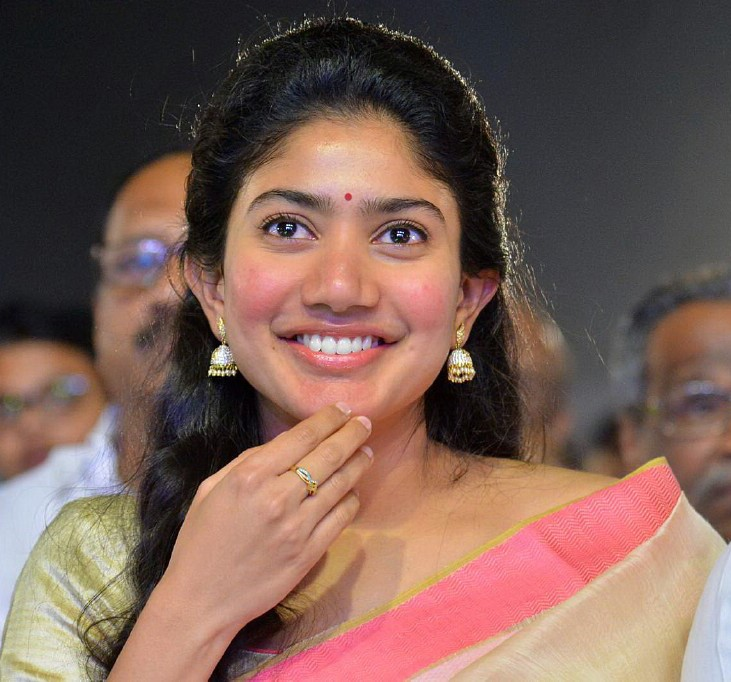
- Latest Winner Sai Pallavi for Gargi
- Awarded for: Best Performance by an Actress in a Leading Role in Tamil films
- Country: India
- Presented by: Government of Tamil Nadu
- First award: 1967
- Final award: 2022
- Currently held by: Sai Pallavi for Gargi

The Tamil Nadu State Film Award for Best Actress is given by the state government as part of the annual Tamil Nadu State Film Awards for Tamil (Kollywood) films. The award in this category was first given in 1967 and discontinued after 1970. It was revived in 1977 and continued till 1982. The awards were not presented from 1971 to 1976. This award was last given in the year 2022 to Sai Pallavi for Gargi.

== Superlatives ==
Wins	Recipient(s)
5	Jyothika
3	Meena, Saritha
2	K. R. Vijaya, Kushboo Sundar, Sneha, Devayani, Nayanthara

● Jyothika won the most awards for best actress five times for her performances in Perazhagan (2004), Chandramukhi (2005), Mozhi (2007), 36 Vayadhile (2015) and Chekka Chivantha Vaanam (2018).

● Priyamani is the only actress who won both Tamilnadu State Film Award and National Film award for the same film in same year. She got both Best Actress Awards for Paruthiveeran.

● Shruti and Lakshmi Menon are the only two actresses to win the award for best actress for their debut performances in Kalki (1996) and Sudarapandian (2012)

● Lakshmi Menon is only actress to win best actress for her performance in two films: Kumki and Sudarapandian (2012). She is also the youngest recipient in this category winning the award at age of 16.

● Padmini and Jyothika are the oldest recipients, winning the award at age of 36.

== List of winners ==
List of winners and nominated work
Year	Recipient(s)	Role(s)	Film(s)	Reference(s)
1967	K. R. Vijaya	Shanthi	Iru Malargal	
1968	Padmini	Mohanambal (Mohana)	Thillaanaa Mohanambal	
1969 †	B. Saroja Devi	Kannamma	Kulavilakku	
1969 †	Sowcar Janaki	Janaki	Iru Kodugal	
1970	K. R. Vijaya	Devi	Namma Veettu Deivam	
1977	Latha	Kayalvizhi	Madhuraiyai Meetta Sundharapandiyan	
1978	Lakshmi	Kalyani	Oru Nadigai Natakam Parkiral	
1979	Saritha	Kalpana	Oru Vellaadu Vengaiyagiradhu	
1980	Suhasini	Viji	Nenjathai Killathe	
1981	Sridevi	Bhagyalaksmi / Vijaya "Viji"	Moondram Pirai	
1982	Saritha	Kannamma	Agni Sakshi	
1988	Saritha	Shakunthala	Poo Pootha Nandavanam	
1989	Radhika	Bhagyam	Ninaivu Chinnam	
1990	Revathi	Thaayamma	Kizhakku Vasal	
1991	Khushbu Sundar	Nandhini	Chinna Thambi	
1992	Sukanya	Deivanai	Chinna Gounder	
1993	Meena	Vaitheeswari	Yejaman	
1994	Rajashree	Karuthamma	Karuthamma	
1995	Khushbu Sundar	Ganga	Kolangal	
1996	Shruti	Kalki	Kalki	
1997 †	Meena	Maragadham	Porkkaalam	
1997 †	Devayani	Nandhini	Suryavamsam	
1998	Roja Selvamani	Radha	Unnidathil Ennai Koduthen	
1999	Simran	Rukmani	Thullatha Manamum Thullum	
2000	Devayani	Chellamal	Bharathi	
2001	Sneha	Thavamani	Virumbugiren	
2002	Meena	Meena Kumari	Ivan	
2003	Laila	Manju	Pithamagan	
2004	Jyothika	• Priya • Shenbagam	Perazhagan	
2005	Jyothika	• Chandramukhi • Ganga Senthilnathan	Chandramukhi	
2006	Priyamani	Mutthazhagu	Paruthiveeran	
2007	Jyothika	Archana	Mozhi	
2008	Sneha	Visalatchi	Pirivom Santhippom	
2009	Padmapriya	Nadira	Pokkisham	
2010	Amala Paul	Mynaa	Mynaa	
2011	Ineya	Madhiarasi	Vaagai Sooda Vaa	
2012	Lakshmi Menon	• Alli • Archana	Kumki; Sundarapandian	
2013	Nayanthara	Regina James	Raja Rani	
2014	Aishwarya Rajesh	Kaaka Muttai's mother	Kaaka Muttai	
2015	Jyothika	Vasanthi Tamizhselvan	36 Vayadhinile	
2016	Keerthi Suresh	Veni	Paambhu Sattai	
2017	Nayanthara	Madhivadhani IAS	Aramm	
2018	Jyothika	Chithra Varadharajan	Chekka Chivantha Vaanam	
2019	Manju Warrier	Pachaiyammal Sivasaami	Asuran	
2020	Aparna Balamurali	Sundari Nedumaaran (Bommi)	Soorarai Pottru	
2021	Lijomol Jose	Senggeni	Jai Bhim	
2022	Sai Pallavi	Gargi	Gargi	

== See also ==
- Tamil cinema
- Cinema of India
