= Inji Vellam =

Upcoming Indian film by Mani Ratnam

- Theatrical release poster
- Directed by: Mani Ratnam
- Written by: Mani Ratnam; Siva Ananth
- Produced by: Mani Ratnam; A. Subaskaran
- Starring: Vijay Sethupathi; Sai Pallavi
- Cinematography: Avik Mukhopadhyay
- Edited by: A. Sreekar Prasad
- Music by: A. R. Rahman
- Production companies: Madras Talkies; Lyca Productions; India Talkies
- Release date: 29 January 2027
- Country: India
- Language: Tamil

Inji Vellam (transl. Ginger, Jaggery) is a upcoming Indian Tamil-language romantic drama film directed by Mani Ratnam, who co-wrote the script with Siva Ananth. Produced by Ratnam's Madras Talkies, India Talkies and A. Subaskaran's Lyca Productions, the film stars Vijay Sethupathi and Sai Pallavi in the lead roles, with Chaithra J Achar in a supporting role.

The film was officially announced in March 2026 under the tentative title Production No. 23, denoting Madras Talkies' 23rd venture, and the official title was revealed the following September. Principal photography took place from July to October 2026 in locations including Kolkata. The film has music composed by A. R. Rahman, cinematography handled by Avik Mukhopadhyay and editing by A. Sreekar Prasad.

Inji Vellam is scheduled for a theatrical release on 29 January 2027.

== Cast ==
- Vijay Sethupathi
- Sai Pallavi
- Chaithra J Achar

== Production ==
=== Development ===
In February 2026, speculations began circulating that actor Vijay Sethupathi would reunite with director Mani Ratnam after Chekka Chivantha Vaanam (2018). On 24 February, Variety India published an exclusive interview in which Sethupathi confirmed the collaboration himself. He said they would be doing something "completely different" from their previous film together. On 20 March, Ratnam's production company, Madras Talkies, announced its next project, featuring Sethupathi and Sai Pallavi. Despite early speculation about a potential collaboration between Ratnam and composer Sai Abhyankkar, Ratnam's norm composer A. R. Rahman was announced. The project was developed and produced through Ratnam's Madras Talkies, with A. Subaskaran's Lyca Productions. India Talkies was also part of the production arrangement. The film's title Inji Vellam was announced on 7 September. The script was co-written by Siva Ananth.

=== Pre-production ===
In April 2026, it was reported that the makers were considering a small promotional shoot that month, followed by principal photography in June, potentially lasting around 40 days. By 24 July, it was reported that the film had been delayed from the anticipated June start and had begun production in July instead. The same month, Cinema Express said that the actors had attended a workshop in Chennai over the preceding days before travelling to Kolkata for filming. Ratnam had reportedly reached the city several days earlier to finalise preparations and had visited Technicians' Studio, where local members of the film industry interacted with him. The historic Belgachia Rajbari was also reported to have been reserved for a two-day shooting schedule on 23 and 24 July.

=== Filming ===
Principal photography began on 23 July 2026 in Kolkata. A two-day schedule was reportedly held at Belgachia Rajbari. On 26 July, it was reported that videos and photographs had emerged from Howrah Bridge showing Sethupathi and Sai Pallavi between takes, speaking with Ratnam. Though Dinamalar reported on 11 August that filming was complete, this was contradicted by a 11 October Deccan Chronicle report that filming had just wrapped.

== Release ==
Inji Vellam is scheduled for a theatrical release on 29 January 2027. According to trade analyst Sreedhar Pillai, it will be distributed by Red Giant Movies in Tamil Nadu.
