= Mangli =

Indian singer, television anchor and actress

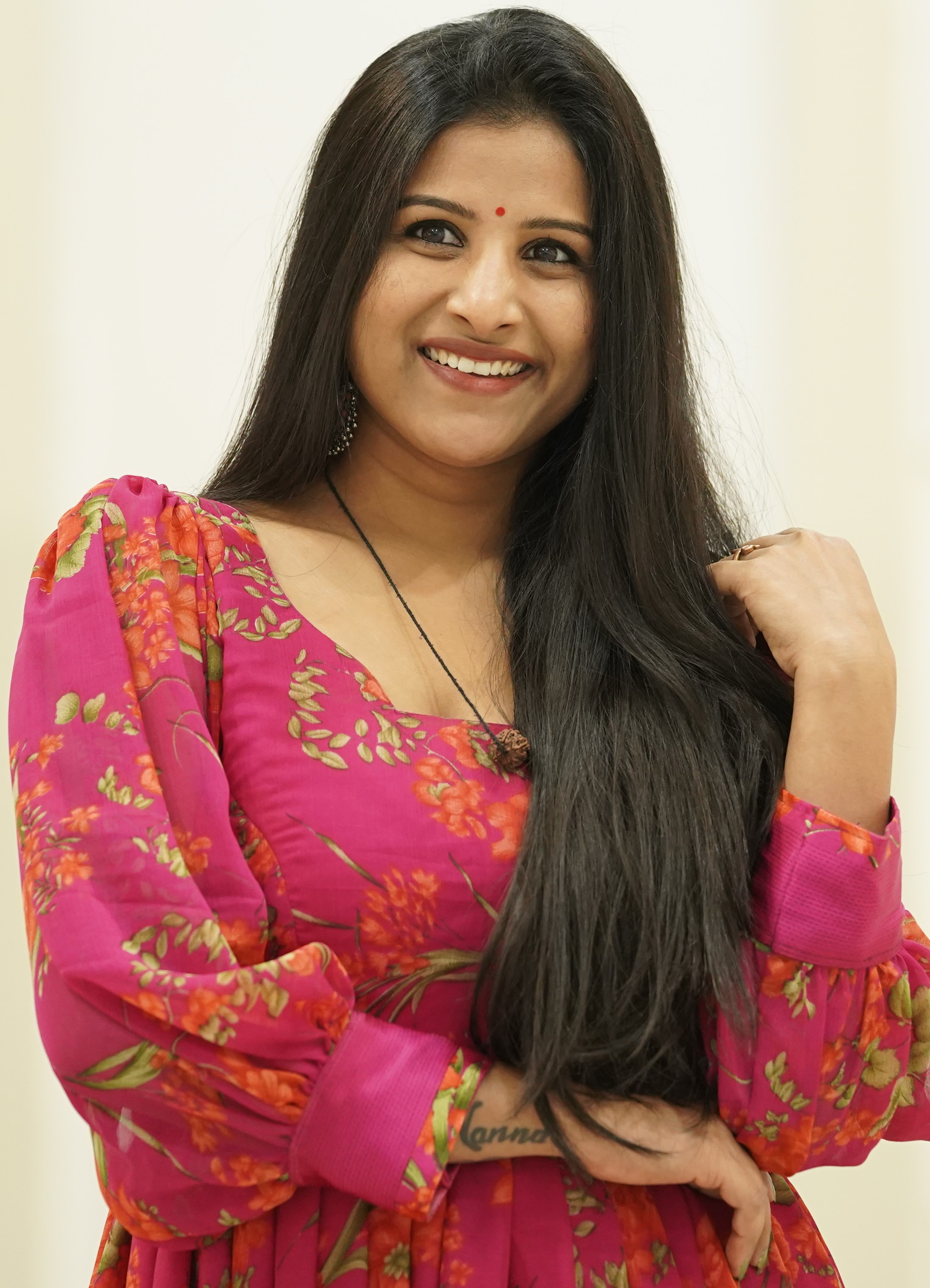
- Born: Satyavathi chowhan 10 June 1994 (age 32); Gooty, Andhra Pradesh, India
- Occupations: Playback singer; Television presenter
- Years active: 2017–present

Satyavathi Chowhan, known by her stage name Mangli, is an Indian singer and television presenter. She primarily sings in Telugu and Kannada languages and is well known for her cultural songs. She has received two SIIMA Awards and an IIFA Utsavam Award.

== Early life ==
Mangli was born in a Banjara community in Gooty, Anantapur district Andhra Pradesh, India. She did her diploma in Carnatic music from the Sri Venkateswara University, Tirupati. Her father encouraged her to become a singer from a young age. Inspired by her teachers, she wanted to become a music teacher. Mangli moved to Hyderabad to begin a career in television presenting.

Mangli has a younger sister, Indravathi Chauhan, who became famous after singing the hit song "Oo Antava Oo Oo Antava" from the film Pushpa: The Rise. The song was sung in Kannada version by Mangli.

== Career ==
She got her first break in her career in 2013, when she was invited as a guest artist on Telugu news channel, V6 News for a Dasara festival special show called as Dhoom Dham. Her popular show on V6 News, where she played as Maatakari Mangli, on the satirical news show, Teenmaar Vaarthalu, along with Bithiri Sathi and Savitri was a hit. She worked with HMTV news channel's, Jordar News on the satirical news show along with Sujatha.

She sings songs on Telangana festivals like Bathukamma, Bonalu and Telangana Formation Day. Her song, "Orugallu Kotanadugu", for 2018 Telangana Formation Day has become a hit. She sang in some Tollywood films like Sapthagiri Express, Raj Mahal, Needhi Naadi Oka Katha, George Reddy and "Ramuloo Ramulaa" song from 2020 action-drama Tollywood film Ala Vaikunthapurramuloo.

In February 2018, she contested on a show hosted by Lakshmi Manchu Maharani. In 2021, her song "Saranga Dariya" for the film Love Story became widely popular.

== Discography ==
=== As a playback singer ===
| Year | Album | Song(s) | Composer(s) | Language(s) |
|---|---|---|---|---|
| 2018 | Shailaja Reddy Alludu | "Shailaja Reddy Alludu Choode" | Gopi Sundar | Telugu |
| 2018 | Needi Naadi Oke Katha | "Parvathi Thanayudavo" | Suresh Bobbili | Telugu |
| 2019 | George Reddy | "Bullet" | Suresh Bobbili | Telugu |
| 2020 | Ala Vaikunthapurramuloo | "Ramuloo Ramulaa" | Thaman S | Telugu |
| 2020 | Naga Bhairavi | "Raave Bhairavi" | Gopi Sundar | Telugu |
| 2021 | A1 Express | "Seatu Siragadha" | Hiphop Tamizha | Telugu |
| 2021 | Seetimaarr | "Jwala Reddy" | Mani Sharma | Telugu |
| 2021 | Love Story | "Saranga Dariya" | Pawan Ch | Telugu |
| 2021 | Rang De | "Oorantha" | Devi Sri Prasad | Telugu |
| 2021 | Roberrt (D) | "Kanne Adhirindhi" | Arjun Janya | Telugu |
| 2021 | Radha Krishna | "Nirmala Bomma" | M. M. Srilekha | Telugu |
| 2021 | Alludu Adhurs | "Ramba Oorvasi Menaka" | Devi Sri Prasad | Telugu |
| 2021 | Krack | "Bhoom Bhaddhal" | Thaman S | Telugu |
| 2021 | Jetty | "Jil Jil" | Karthik Kondakandla | Telugu |
| 2021 | Gully Rowdy | "Changure Item Songree" | Sai Karthik | Telugu |
| 2021 | Pelli SandaD | "BujjuluBujjulu" | M. M. Keeravani | Telugu |
| 2021 | Ek Love Ya | "Yennegu Hennigu" | Arjun Janya | Kannada |
| 2021 | Pushpa: The Rise (D) | "Oo Anthiya Oo Oo Anthiya" | Devi Sri Prasad | Kannada |
| 2022 | Rowdy Boys | "Brindavanam" | Devi Sri Prasad | Telugu |
| 2022 | Golmaal | | Aruldev | Tamil |
| 2022 | Hero | "Burra Paadavuthadhe" | Ghibran | Telugu |
| 2022 | Sehari | "Life of Varun" | Prashanth R Vihari | Telugu |
| 2022 | 10th Class Diaries | "Yenneno Andhala Bangaru Chiluka" | Suresh Bobbili | Telugu |
| 2022 | Vikrant Rona (D) | "Ra Ra Rakkamma" | B. Ajaneesh Loknath | Telugu |
| 2022 | Triple Riding | "Yatta Yatta Yatta" | Sai Karthik | Kannada |
| 2022 | Dilpasand | "Rama Rama Rama" | Arjun Janya | Kannada |
| 2022 | Shiva 143 | "Nanthak Baa" | Arjun Janya | Kannada |
| 2022 | Dhamaka | "Jinthaak" | Bheems Ceciroleo | Telugu |
| 2022 | Dhamaka | "Dandakadiyal" | Bheems Ceciroleo | Telugu |
| 2022 | Vedha | "Gillakko Shiva" | Arjun Janya | Kannada |
| 2022 | Like, Share & Subscribe | "Emanti Nabayaa" | Pravin Lakkaraju | Telugu |
| 2023 | Michael | "Pammare" | Chandrabose | Telugu |
| 2023 | Balagam | "Ooru Palletooru" | Bheems Ceciroleo | Telugu |
| 2023 | Das Ka Dhamki | "O Dollar Pillagaa" | Leon James | Telugu |
| 2023 | Bholaa Shankar | "Jam Jam Jajjanaka" | Mahati Swara Sagar | Telugu |
| 2023 | Kaatera | "Pasandaagavne" | V. Harikrishna | Kannada |
| 2023 | Jawan | "Zinda Banda" | Anirudh Ravichander | Hindi |
| 2023 | Jawan | "Vandha Edam" | Anirudh Ravichander | Tamil |
| 2023 | Jawan | "Dhumme Dhulipelaa" | Anirudh Ravichander | Telugu |
| 2024 | The Family Star | "Kalyani Vaccha Vacchaa" | Gopi Sundar | Telugu |
| 2024 | Theppa Samudram | "Yaadunnado" | Peddapalli Rohith | Telugu |
| 2024 | Jithender Reddy | "Lachimakka" | Gopi Sundar | Telugu |
| 2024 | Darling | "Bhaag Saale" | Vivek Sagar | Telugu |
| 2024 | Mr. Celebrity | "Gajanana" | Vinod Yajamanya | Telugu |
| 2024 | Aay | "Entha Andhamo" | Ajay Arasada | Telugu |
| 2024 | Maruthi Nagar Subramanyam | "Lachhim Lachhim Devi" | Kalyan Nayak | Telugu |
| 2024 | Dhoom Dhaam | "Mallepoola Taxi" | Gopi Sundar | Telugu |
| 2024 | Mechanic Rocky | "Gulledu Gulledu" | Jakes Bejoy | Telugu |
| 2024 | Srikakulam Sherlock Holmes | "Ma Ooru Srikakulam" | Sunil Kashyap | Telugu |
| 2025 | Racharikam | "Tikku Tikku" | Vengi | Telugu |
| 2025 | Baapu | "Saami Soodaraa" | RR Dhruvan | Telugu |
| 2025 | Mad Square | "Laddu Gaani Pelli" | Bheems Ceciroleo | Telugu |
| 2025 | Hari Hara Veera Mallu: Part 1 | "Kollagottinadhiro" | M. M. Keeravani | Telugu |
| 2025 | Chaurya Paatham | "Kanne Kaane" | Davzand | Telugu |
| 2025 | Ari: My Name is Nobody | "Chinnari Kittayya" | Anup Rubens | Telugu |
| 2025 | Maarnami | "Ye Maaraya" | Charan Raj | Kannada |
| 2025 | The Great Pre-Wedding Show | "Pre Wedding Anthem" | Suresh Bobbili | Telugu |
| 2026 | Magudam | "Nachindhi Machane" | G. V. Prakash | Tamil |
| 2026 | Bail | Kumari Kumari | B. Ajaneesh Loknath | Kannada |

=== Singles ===
==== As lead artist ====
| Year | Song(s) | Composer(s) | |
|---|---|---|---|
| 2017 | "Telugu Mahasabhalu" | | Telugu |
| 2017 | "Bathukamma" | Pramod Pulligilla | Telugu |
| 2017 | "Bathukamma special" | Satya Sagar Polam | Telugu |
| 2017 | "Bathukamma" | Suresh Bobbili | Telugu |
| 2017 | "Ammava Rati Bommava" | Mustafa | Telugu |
| 2017 | "Rela Re Rela Re" | Nandan Bobbili | Telugu |
| 2018 | "Deepawali" | | Telugu |
| 2018 | "Dussehra" | | Telugu |
| 2018 | "Bathukamma" | Suresh Bobbili | Telugu |
| 2018 | "Ganesh Chaturthi" | Ameen | Telugu |
| 2018 | "Bonalu" | Suresh Bobbili | Telugu |
| 2018 | "Banjara Teej" | Kalyana | Telugu |
| 2018 | "Telangana Formation day 2018" | Nandan Bobbili | Telugu |
| 2018 | "KCR" | Ravi Varma Potedar | Telugu |
| 2018 | "Ugadi" | Nandan Bobbili | Telugu |
| 2018 | "Banjara" | Kalyana | Telugu |
| 2018 | "Sammakka Sarakka" | Meenakshi Bhujang | Telugu |
| 2018 | "Sankranti 2018" | Nandan Bobbili | Telugu |
| 2019 | "Bullet" | Suresh Bobbili, Harshavardhan Rameshwar | Telugu |
| 2019 | "Telangana Formation Day 2019" | | Telugu |
| 2019 | "Jago Banjara" | | Telugu |
| 2019 | "Sivaratri 2019" | SK Baji | Telugu |
| 2019 | "Sankranthi 2019" | | Telugu |
| 2019 | "Janapadam" | Thirupathi Matla | Telugu |
| 2020 | "Raba Raba" | SK Baji | Telugu |
| 2020 | "Jagan Anna" | | Telugu |
| 2020 | "Corona" | Madeen SK | Telugu |
| 2020 | "Ganapati Paata 2020" | Ram Miriyala | Telugu |
| 2020 | "Gnani Sugnani" | Bobby | Telugu |
| 2020 | "Laire Lallaire" | Thirupathi Matla | Telugu |
| 2020 | "Sevalal Maharaj Song" | Madeen SK | Banjara |
| 2020 | "Bathukamma 2020" | SK Baji, Suresh Bobbili | Telugu |
| 2020 | "Teej 2020" | Madeen SK | Banjara |
| 2020 | "Shivaratri 2020" | Charan Arjun | Telugu |
| 2021 | "Yogi Tattvam" | SK Baji | Telugu |
| 2021 | "Sivaratri 2021" | Madeen SK | Telugu |
| 2021 | "Bonalu 2021" | Rakesh Venkatapuram | Telugu |
| 2021 | "Teej 2021" | Mangli | Banjara |
| 2021 | "Ganapati Paata 2021" | Suresh Bobbili | Telugu |
| 2022 | "Vinave Vinave Manasa" | SK Baji | Telugu |
| 2022 | "Neeli Neelakantuda" | Madeen SK | Telugu |
| 2022 | "Sivaratri 2022" | Suresh Bobbilli | Telugu |
| 2022 | "Dharani" | Madeen SK | Telugu |
| 2022 | "Gijjagiri" | Madeen SK | Telugu |
| 2022 | "Sivaratri 2022 Second Version" | Suresh Bobbilli | Telugu |
| 2022 | "Belli Bettavanalone" | Mangli | Kannada |
| 2022 | "Jaale" | Bheems Ceciroleo | Telugu |
| 2022 | "Bhenoy" | Bheems Ceciroleo | Banjara |
| 2022 | "Jaana" | Bheems Ceciroleo | Kannada |
| 2022 | "Bathukamma 2022" | Madeen SK | Telugu |
| 2022 | "Jagajjanani" | Madeen SK | Telugu |
| 2022 | "Alai Balai" | Madeen SK | Telugu |
| 2023 | "Rani" | Madeen SK | Telugu |
| 2023 | "Bam Bam Bhole" | Prashanth R Vihari | Telugu |
| 2023 | "Bam Bam Bhole" | Prashanth R Vihari | Hindi |
| 2023 | "Bam Bam Bhole" | Prashanth R Vihari | Kannada |
| 2023 | "Bonalu 2023" | Madeen SK | Telugu |
| 2023 | "Sandamamayyalo" | Joel Sastry | Telugu |
| 2023 | "Bathukamma 2023" | Suresh Bobbili | Telugu |
| 2024 | "Danguru Danguru" | Prashanth R Vihari | Telugu |
| 2024 | "Danguru Danguru" | Prashanth R Vihari | Kannada |
| 2024 | "Danguru Danguru" | Prashanth R Vihari | Hindi |
| 2024 | "Danguru Danguru" | Prashanth R Vihari | Tamil |
| 2024 | "Yellamma Bonam" | Suresh Bobbili | Telugu |
| 2024 | "Kampela" | Madeen SK | Banjara |
| 2024 | "Radhe Krishna Radhe" | Prashanth R Vihari | Telugu |
| 2025 | "Nee Kosam" | Kamran | Telugu |
| 2025 | "Sivaratri 2025" | Charan Arjun | Telugu |
| 2025 | "Bayilone Ballipalike" | Suresh Bobbili | Telugu |

==== As featured artist ====
| Year | Song(s) | Lead artist | Composer(s) | Notes |
|---|---|---|---|---|
| 2020 | "Aada Nemali" | Kanakavva | Madeen SK | |

== Filmography ==
| Year | Title | Role | Notes | Ref. |
|---|---|---|---|---|
| 2020 | Swecha | | Debut film | |
| 2020 | Guvva Gorinka | Prank reporter | Uncredited Cameo | |
| 2021 | Maestro | Murali's sister | | |
| 2024 | Dhoom Dhaam | Herself | Cameo | |

== Awards and nominations ==
| Award | Year | Category | Work | Result | Ref. |
|---|---|---|---|---|---|
| Filmfare Awards South | 2024 | Best Female Playback Singer – Telugu | "Ooru Palletooru" (from Balagam) | Nominated | |
| Filmfare Awards South | 2024 | Best Female Playback Singer – Kannada | "Pasandaagavne" (from Kaatera) | Nominated | |
| IIFA Utsavam | 2024 | Best Female Playback Singer – Telugu | "Ooru Palletooru" (from Balagam) | Won | |
| South Indian International Movie Awards | 2021 | Best Female Playback Singer – Telugu | "Bullet" (from George Reddy) | Nominated | |
| South Indian International Movie Awards | 2022 | Best Female Playback Singer – Telugu | "Saranga Dariya" (from Love Story) | Nominated | |
| South Indian International Movie Awards | 2023 | Best Female Playback Singer – Telugu | "Jinthaak" (from Dhamaka) | Won | |
