= Love Story (2021 film) =

2021 Indian film by Sekhar Kammula

- Theatrical release poster
- Directed by: Sekhar Kammula
- Written by: Sekhar Kammula
- Produced by: Narayan Das K Narang; Puskur Ram Mohan Rao
- Starring: Naga Chaitanya; Sai Pallavi
- Cinematography: Vijay C. Kumar
- Edited by: Marthand K. Venkatesh
- Music by: Pawan Ch
- Production companies: Sree Venkateswara Cinemas LLP; Amigos Creations
- Distributed by: Asian Cinemas
- Release date: 24 September 2021
- Running time: 165 minutes
- Country: India
- Language: Telugu
- Budget: ₹30 crore
- Box office: est. ₹95–100 crore

Love Story is a 2021 Indian Telugu-language musical romantic-drama film written and directed by Sekhar Kammula. Produced by Amigos Creations and Sree Venkateswara Cinemas LLP, the film stars Naga Chaitanya and Sai Pallavi while Rajeev Kanakala, Devayani, Easwari Rao and Uttej play supporting roles. The film tells the story of an inter-caste relationship between Mounika (Pallavi) and Revanth (Chaitanya) who meet in the city while pursuing their dreams.

The film was announced in June 2019 with principal photography commencing in September 2019. It was shot extensively in Hyderabad and other places in Telangana while a schedule took place in Dubai. Filming was halted in March 2020 due to the COVID-19 pandemic. The shoot resumed in September and completed in November 2020. Love Story features score composed by Pawan Ch while cinematography and editing are performed by Vijay C. Kumar and Marthand K. Venkatesh respectively.

Love Story was initially scheduled to release on 2 April 2020 but was deferred multiple times due to the COVID-19 pandemic. The film is theatrically released on 24 September 2021 and received mixed reviews from critics who praised the performances while the lengthy runtime received criticism. The film netted ₹8.75 crore in India on its first day, the highest since theatres reopened and began showing cinemas, after the second covid wave. The film grossed over ₹95–100 crore at the box office, against a budget of ₹30 crore making it a commercially successful venture.

== Plot ==
Revanth is a lower caste Christian settled in Hyderabad who runs a Zumba center. Mounika, an upper caste girl, also arrives in Hyderabad in search of a job and moves into a neighbouring house. As Mounika is unsuccessful in finding a job, Revanth offers her to share pamphlets for his Zumba center for money but she rejects it for which Revanth mocks her. Following another unsuccessful job trail, she comes to the Zumba centre and dances while Revanth also joins her. Impressed with her dance, Revanth asks her to join his Zumba centre as a partner. Mounika negotiates a salary and starts working with him. Their Zumba centre becomes popular and they desire to expand their business by finding a bigger space in the city. Due to paucity of money, Revanth convinces his mother to sell their land in his hometown Armoor.

Mounika also hails from Armoor and her uncle Narasimham is an influential man in their town. He quotes a far lower price for Revanth's land and Revanth refuses to sell. That night, Mounika confronts Narasimham and demands the share of her money from their property. Narasimham refuses by intimidating Mounika, and she faints. Later, she angrily leaves the town and Revanth follows. She offers her jewellery to Revanth for their business expansion. Revanth mortgages his land and opens a bigger Zumba centre. They overcome their differences and fall in love. Mounika proposes Revanth and he accepts. As she is afraid of her abusive uncle, they plan to elope. Revanth's uncle, a police sub-inspector helps them and they devise a plan to frame that Mounika has committed suicide so that no one doubts her whereabouts. They decide to execute their plan after six months and make the necessary arrangements. Revanth goes to Dubai in the meantime and they decide to get married at a registrar's office once he returns.

Revanth waits at the registrar's office but Mounika does not arrive. Revanth worriedly returns to Armoor and meets Mounika. She tells Revanth that Narasimham is an incest pedophile and she was sexually abused as a child by her uncle and now he is targeting her sister. She has thus decided to stay back and protect her. Revanth takes Mounika to her house who reveals the situation to her parents. In the meantime, her uncle arrives at their home. He confronts them but Mounika's mother locks him up in a room and asks Mounika to leave with Revanth by promising that she would take care of her sister. They run away by taking Revanth's mother along but Narasimham's men chase them. Revanth refuses to escape and decides to fight back. As Narasimham tries to kill Mounika, Revanth kills him in retaliation and he is arrested by the police. Later the court admits that Revanth's act was unintentional.

== Cast ==
- Naga Chaitanya as Revanth
- Sai Pallavi as Mounika 'Mouni' Rani
- Rajeev Kanakala as Narasimham, Mounika's uncle
- Devayani as Mounika's mother
- Easwari Rao as Manamma, Revanth's mother
- Uttej as Sub-Inspector Immanna, Revanth’s friend
- Ananda Chakrapani as Mounika's father
- Gangavva as Gangavva
- Rana Daggubati, voice-over as the judge

== Production ==
=== Development ===
In September 2018, Narayan Das K. Narang and Pushkar Ram Mohan Rao of Asian Cinemas, a prominent distribution and multiplex venture announced their maiden film production, through its subsidiary Sree Venkateshwara Cinemas. Sekhar Kammula was reported to direct for the banner, along with his own production Amigos Creations and was reported to be a musical romantic comedy film featuring debutants. Dimple Hayathi was signed to play the lead. However, the project was later shelved after a minor shoot.

Kammula later approached Naga Chaitanya for the project, whom he eventually agreed after reading the script. Sai Pallavi was also chosen for the female lead role, marking her second collaboration with Kammula after Fidaa (2017). A formal launch event with a pooja ceremony was held on 27 June 2019 at the Venkateshwara Temple in Tirupati. Love Story was reported as a tentative title, which was confirmed as the film's official title in January 2020.

=== Cast and crew ===
Kammula announced that Chaitanya will be seen speaking Telangana dialect in the film, and Pallavi "could spring a surprise for the audience." Devayani, Rao Ramesh, Posani Krishna Murali, Rajeev Kanakala and Easwari Rao amongst others were reported to appear in supporting roles, along with Satyam Rajesh and Thagubothu Ramesh. Sekhar Kammula roped in debutant Pawan Ch, an alumnus of A. R. Rahman's KM Music Conservatory, to score music for the songs and the background. Vijay C. Kumar and Marthand K. Venkatesh who regularly worked in Kammula's projects, handled the cinematography and editing respectively.

=== Filming ===
The principal photography of the film commenced on 9 September 2019 in Hyderabad. After shooting crucial scenes in Hyderabad and surrounding areas, and the team traveled to Dubai for their next schedule in February 2020, which was stalled in the same month due to the COVID-19 pandemic.

Filming was resumed on 5 September 2020 with a limited crew of 15 members being present in the final schedule. In mid-September, a song featuring Chaitanya and Pallavi was shot at the Bodakonda falls in Ranga Reddy district. One of the songs were reported to be choreographed and instructed by Pallavi, with the team stating her "extraordinary talent in dancing". The shooting of the film was completed in November 2020.

== Music ==
The film score and the soundtrack album are composed by Pawan Ch, a student of A. R. Rahman's music institution KM Music Conservatory, thus marking his debut as a composer in a feature film. The full album featuring five tracks was unveiled on the occasion of Vinayaka Chaviti (10 September 2021).

== Release ==
Love Story was scheduled to release on 2 April 2020, coinciding the occasion of Rama Navmi, but was deferred due to the COVID-19 pandemic. In January 2021, the makers announced that Love Story was scheduled for a release on the Ugadi weekend, 16 April 2021, along with simultaneously dubbed versions in Kannada and Malayalam languages. However, in April, the film's release has been put on hold owing to the rise in COVID-19 cases in Telangana and Andhra Pradesh and the second wave of the pandemic.

Following the reduction of cases and theatres being reopened in Andhra and Telangana after its closure, In August 2021, the makers announced the new release date as 10 September 2021, coinciding with the festival of Vinayaka Chavithi. However, the film's release was postponed as the trade exhibitors believed that it may clash with the film Tuck Jagadish, releasing on Amazon Prime Video. Sunil Narang, the film's presenter and also the vice president of Telangana Film Chamber of Commerce (TFCC) requested the producers of Tuck Jagadish, to reschedule the release date, however, they denied their request, which led the producers to revise the release date to 24 September 2021. The film will be the first film to be screened at Vijay Deverakonda's newly launched multiplex theatre AVD Cinemas, at Mahbubnagar, Telangana.

=== Distribution and home media ===
Prior to the release, the film made a business of ₹32 crore (US$3.3 million) from its theatrical rights, Geetha Arts' subsidiary digital service Aha, claimed the acquisition for the film's post-theatrical streaming rights, with the television broadcasting rights were acquired by Star Maa. Advance bookings for the film began on 22 September, two days before the theatrical release and it fetched ₹1 crore (US$100,000) from the worldwide pre-booking sales. The film premiered on Aha on 22 October 2021. The film's Hindi version dubbed by Aditya Movies was premiered on Sony Max on 13 February 2022.

== Controversy ==
In March 2021, singer Komala, who gathered and performed the folk song "Saranga Dariya" on a television show years before the release of its theatrical version, stated that she wasn't credited in the lyrical video as promised. Director Kammula responded that Komala will be credited and compensated for the song.

== Reception ==
=== Critical reception ===
Love Story received mixed reviews from critics who praised the performances while the lengthy runtime received criticism. Neeshita Nyayapati of The Times of India called the film Kammula's "ode to love." She said that Chaitanya has delivered one of his career's best performances and Pallavi was "dream to watch" while also praising the supporting cast of Kanakala, Easwari Rao and Uttej. However, Nayapati felt that the ending was a little rushed. Hindustan Times's Haricharan Pudipeddi stated: "In spite of the hurried climax and the predictable ending, the film works to a large extent because of its sensible treatment and earnest performances of Naga Chaitanya and Sai Pallavi, who complement each other so well."

The Hindu critic Sangeetha Devi Dundoo appreciated the performances of Chaitanya and Pallavi, and Kammula's taking, writing, "Love Story could have been yet another Sairaat, but Sekhar expertly steers it in a different direction in the last act. Romance is one of the most commonly explored genres in commercial cinema and after a point, one tends to view it with cynicism. But this one kept me invested; I watched with bated breath, hoping that Revanth and Mounika cross the hurdles in their path. Gabbetta Ranjith Kumar of The Indian Express called the film Kammula's best yet. "With its foot-tapping music, captivating dance moves and engaging script, it gives you bang for your buck and then delivers a social commentary that you take home with you," he wrote. In another positive review, a critic from Deccan Chronicle appreciated the direction and performance, writing, "Love Story movie illustrates the prevalent caste discrimination amid a love story, and director Sekhar Kammula gets it right for most part, balancing the two aspects of the film."

Balakrishna Ganeshan of The News Minute called Pawan Ch's music as one of the film's biggest strengths. He appreciated Kumar's cinematography but criticized the poorly done CGI to show the iconic Purana pul bridge. Ganesan also compared Love Story with Uppena which was released earlier that year, saying that both the protagonists were Dalit Christian but were deprived of a happy ending. Murali Krishna Ch of Cinema Express said that despite a promising start, the film lost its steam as it progressed due to uninspired writing. He opined that Kammula has changed the usual style of filmmaking but the premise of the film itself is an old trope in Telugu cinema. Vijaya Mruthyunjaya from Deccan Herald opined that the film lacked "heart" with unnecessary backstories and needless subplots, adding that Love Story paled out in comparison to other Telugu films of the same genre like K. Balachander's love tragedy Maro Charitra (1978). Reviewing the film for Business Standard, J Jagannath criticized Kammula's direction saying that he treated the sensitive climax portions in an "almost flippant manner by leaving the audience high and dry with a hurried ending."

=== Box office ===
Love Story grossed ₹100 crore worldwide at the box office. It earned ₹16.5 crore worldwide on its opening day, with ₹10.3 crore coming from the states of Andhra Pradesh and Telangana. Box Office India reported that the film netted 8.75 crore in India on day one, making it the 8th highest opener post-COVID-19 pandemic and the highest since cinemas began to be shown in theatres, after the theatres being reopened after the second wave. In its opening weekend, the film grossed ₹10.25 crore with distributors obtaining a share of 5.7 crore. The film grossed ₹99.05 crore in its first seven days of release. The film entered the profit zone on its 16th day, grossing over ₹98 crore.

== Accolades ==
Award (Note: Awards, festivals and organizations are in alphabetical order.)	Date of ceremony (Note: Date is linked to the article about the awards held that year, wherever possible.)	Category	Recipient(s)	Result	Ref.
Filmfare Awards South	9 October 2022	Best Film – Telugu	Amigos Creations, Sree Venkateswara Cinemas	Nominated	
Filmfare Awards South	9 October 2022	Best Director – Telugu	Sekhar Kammula	Nominated	
Filmfare Awards South	9 October 2022	Best Actor – Telugu	Naga Chaitanya	Nominated	
Filmfare Awards South	9 October 2022	Best Actress – Telugu	Sai Pallavi	Won	
South Indian International Movie Awards	10–11 September 2022	Best Film – Telugu	Amigos Creations, Sree Venkateswara Cinemas	Nominated	
South Indian International Movie Awards	10–11 September 2022	Best Actor – Telugu	Naga Chaitanya	Nominated	
South Indian International Movie Awards	10–11 September 2022	Best Actress – Telugu	Sai Pallavi	Nominated	
South Indian International Movie Awards	10–11 September 2022	Best Music Director – Telugu	Pawan Ch	Nominated	
South Indian International Movie Awards	10–11 September 2022	Best Lyricist – Telugu	Mittapalli Surender – (for song "Nee Chitram Choosi")	Nominated	
South Indian International Movie Awards	10–11 September 2022	Best Male Playback Singer – Telugu	Anurag Kulkarni – (for song "Nee Chitram Choosi")	Nominated	
South Indian International Movie Awards	10–11 September 2022	Best Female Playback Singer – Telugu	Mangli – (for song "Saranga Dariya")	Nominated	
South Indian International Movie Awards	10–11 September 2022	Entertainer of the Year	Sai Pallavi (Note: Also for Shyam Singha Roy.)	Won	
