= Circuitt =

- Theatrical release poster
- Directed by: Aakash Pendharkar
- Written by: Sanjay Jamkhandi
- Produced by: Madhur Bhandarkar; Paragg Mehta; Ameet Dograa; Prabhakar Parab; Sachin Narkar; Vikas Pawar
- Starring: Vaibhav Tatwawadi; Hruta Durgule; Ramesh Pardeshi
- Cinematography: Shabbir Naik
- Edited by: Dinesh Poojari
- Music by: Abhijeet Kawthalkar
- Production companies: Bhandarkar Entertainment; Phoenix Productions; Devi Sateri Production; Swaroop Studios
- Release date: 7 April 2023
- Country: India
- Language: Marathi

Circuitt is a 2023 Indian Marathi-language action thriller film directed by Aakash Pendharkar in his directorial debut. It is a remake of 2016 Sameer Thahir's Malyalam film Kali. The film is produced by Madhur Bhadarkar under the banner of Bhandarkar Entertainment and Paragg Mehta. Vaibhav Tatwawadi and Hruta Durgule in lead roles. It was theatrically released on 7 April 2023.

== Cast ==
- Vaibhav Tatwawadi as Siddharth Mohite
- Hruta Durgule as Aarohi
- Ramesh Pardeshi as Sarkar
- Milind Shinde

== Release ==
The film was theatrically released on 7 April 2023.

== Music ==
Music of the movie is composed by Abhijeet Kawthalkar and background score is by Aditya Bedekar and lyrics penned by Jitendra Joshi, Anand Pendharkar.

== Reception ==
A reviewer from The Times of India gave 2.5/5 rating and wrote "The film is not as impactful as its Malayalam counterpart, it does have some decent scenes and can make for an entertaining watch if this genre your cup of tea."

A reviewer from Maharashtra Times also gave same rating praised music and score, he wrote: In terms of story adaptation, his writing is lacking. Although there seems to be a lack of innovation, the cinema entertains.
