= Avila Convent =

Convent school for girls in Tamil Nadu, India

Coordinates: 11.02539°N 76.933713°E

Avila Convent is a convent school for girls in Coimbatore, Tamil Nadu, India. It is recognized by the Board of Matriculation schools under the Education Department of Tamil Nadu, and trains students for the X and XII Board exams. It is one of the few schools in Coimbatore with ISO 9001 certification.

== Patronage ==
The school's patron saint is Saint Teresa of Avila, christened after the province Avila in Spain, and the convent motto is "Love, Truth and Service".

Avila Convent Mat. Hr. Sec School is run by the sisters of the Congregation of Mother of Carmel (CMC), a large congregation of sisters founded by the Blessed Kuriakose Elias Chavara, with over 6000 sisters working all over India and abroad. The charism of this congregation is 'contemplation in action'.

== Origin ==
The school in Coimbatore was started in 1967. Currently over 3000 children study in various classes of the school starting from kindergarten to XII grade. The medium of instruction is English, while Tamil is taught as a second language and Hindi as an optional language.

== Related Institutions ==
Sister concerns in and around Tamil Nadu are,

- Vimal Jyothi Mat.Hr.Sec.School, Saravanampatti
- Little Flower Convent Mat.Hr.Sec.School, Tiruppur
- Infant Jesus Mat School, Thekkupalayam
- Lourde Matha Mat.Hr.Sec.School, Udumalpet
- Infant Jesus Society for Education and Training for Hearing impaired (Deaf & Dumb), Thekkupalayam.

== Notable people ==
- Sai Pallavi Indian actress, alumni of Avila convent

== Timeline ==
- June 1967: Birth of Avila Convent School with 94 students, designed by the Provincial Superior Mary Patience.
- June 1968: The first block of the school building is completed and the same is inaugurated in December 1968
- April 1972: Recognition from the University of Madras for 9th standard.
- July 1978: Inauguration of the Higher Secondary classes by special officer of Coimbatore Municipality, Mr. Aadimoolam
- Oct 1978: Permanent recognition
- Oct 1991: Silver Jubilee Academic Year.
- June 1994: New Nursery Block inaugurated.
- June 1996: Sr. Patrick, the then principal was awarded 'State Best Teacher'.
- Nov 1996: Children’s Amusement Park inaugurated by Worship Mayor Gopala Krishnan
- Sept 1998: The Principal was conferred the title 'Vidya Ratna'. Velankanni statue installed near the gate. In 1998, Indhu was awarded State Rank in English under Mrs. Hemalatha's most encouraging guidance.
- Feb 2001: New Chapel blessed by Mar Jacob Manathodath, Bishop of Palakkad. In 2001 Sangeetha Ramani received stated second in Hindi in Higher Secondary examination.
- May 2003: The principal Rev. Sr. Patrick received 'Outstanding Teacher Award'. Rating conducted by Sun TV for academic excellence, Avila was placed first in the district of Coimbatore and Nilgiris and fifth place in the State of Tamil Nadu.
- May 2004: 'Commendation Award' and 'Visishta Seva Award' were received by the principal Rev. Sr. Patrick. Rating conducted by Sun TV for Academic excellence, Avila was placed first in the district of Coimbatore and Nilgiris and third in the State of Tamil Nadu.
- Feb 2005: Became ISO 9001 – 2000 accredited school
- Nov 2015 : Golden Jubilee Year Inaugurated, with Sr. Shalini as Principal.
- Nov 2016 : Actress Sai Pallavi, Avila Alumni paid a visit to the school.
- January 2017 : The school celebrated its Golden Jubilee.
