= Saranga Dariya =

Indian Telugu folk song

Single by Mangli (theatrical version)

from the album Love Story (theatrical version)
- Language: Telugu
- Released: 28 February 2021 (theatrical lyrical)
- Recorded: 2021
- Studio: AM Studios, Chennai
- Genre: Filmi; Folk
- Length: 3:47
- Label: Aditya Music
- Composer: Pawan. Ch (theatrical version)
- Lyricist: Suddala Ashok Teja (theatrical version)
- Producer: Pawan. Ch

Mangli (theatrical version) singles chronology
"Oorantha" (2021)	"Saranga Dariya" (2021)	"Jwala Reddy" (2021)

Music video
- "Saranga Dariya" on YouTube

"Saranga Dariya" is an Indian Telugu-language folk song, originally sung by Telangana folk artistes. The song was sung by various artistes with slight changes in the lyrics. It is featured in the 2021 Telugu film Love Story starring Sai Pallavi. It is composed by Pawan CH., sung by Mangli and with lyrics written by Suddala Ashok Teja. The song became popular, when singer Komali Tatte sang it in the reality TV series Relare Rela in 2010. The film's lyrical version was released on 28 February 2021 through Aditya Music.

== Music video ==
The theatrical version of the song featured Sai Pallavi dancing with choreography by Sekhar. Suddala Ashok Teja wrote the lyrics for the theatrical version.

== Reception ==
The song is popular among the Telangana folk songs. The theatrical version of the song became popular due to which it is spotted in top positions in the national music charts. Singer Mangli got wider appreciation for her vocals. The lyrical song received praise for Sai Pallavi's dance, choreography and the vocals by Mangli adding a "perfect Telangana nativity to the folk number".

=== Controversy ===
In March 2021, singer Komali Tatte, who gathered and performed the folk song "Saranga Dariya" on a television show years before the release of its theatrical version, stated that she wasn't credited in the lyrical video as promised. Director Kammula responded that Komali will be credited and compensated for the song.
