= Virata Parvam =

Telugu-language historical drama film

- Theatrical release poster
- Directed by: Venu Udugula
- Written by: Venu Udugula
- Produced by: Sudhakar Cherukuri; Srikanth Chundi; Rana Daggubati
- Starring: Sai Pallavi; Rana Daggubati
- Cinematography: Dani Sanchez-Lopez
- Edited by: A. Sreekar Prasad
- Music by: Suresh Bobbili
- Production companies: SLV Cinemas; Suresh Productions
- Release date: 17 June 2022
- Running time: 150 minutes
- Country: India
- Language: Telugu
- Budget: ₹15 crore
- Box office: est. ₹13 crore

Virata Parvam (Note: Alternatively spelt Viraata Parvam) (transl. The chapter of Virata) is a 2022 Indian Telugu-language period romantic action drama film written and directed by Venu Udugula, and produced by Suresh Productions and SLV Cinemas. The film stars Sai Pallavi and Rana Daggubati while Priyamani, Nandita Das, Naveen Chandra, Zarina Wahab, Easwari Rao, and Sai Chand play supporting roles. Set in Telangana region in the 1990s amidst the Naxalite movement, the film tells the story of Vennela (Pallavi), a young woman who is in pursuit of her love with Ravi Shankar (Daggubati), a Naxal leader.

Principal photography began in July 2019 and ended in December 2020, with filming locations including Vikarabad, Warangal, and Hyderabad in Telangana, and Kerala. The film has music composed by Suresh Bobbili with cinematography by Dani Sanchez-Lopez. Initially scheduled to release on 30 April 2021, it has been postponed due to the COVID-19 situation in India. Virata Parvam was released theatrically on 17 June 2022. But though it received positive reviews, still it underperformed at the box-office.

== Plot ==
Vennela was born in 1973 in Warangal district, amidst a cross-fire between the Naxals and the police. She grows up listening to the poetry of her father and is later inspired by the writings of Ravi Shankar (known as Comrade Ravanna), a Naxal leader who uses the pen name Aranya. Vennela becomes obsessed with Ravi's works, therefore admiring and loving him.

In 1992, the state police probes her village under suspicion that the villagers are sympathetic to the Naxals. They thrash Vennela's father severely as he objects to their actions. Vennela scolds the police in retaliation but they harass her. Ravi's troop arrives and ambushes the police. Ravi assures the safety of the villagers, impressing Vennela.

Vennela calls off the wedding with her cousin by telling him that she is deeply in love with Ravi, much to the dismay of her parents. She leaves her house the following day in pursuit of Ravi and writes to her parents not to search for her. Vennela meets Vidyadhar Rao in Karimnagar who publishes Ravi's books. She requests him to give Ravi's address but Rao declines to help her. He gets arrested by the police as she leaves the place. Vennela enquires and finds out Ravi's house. She meets his mother who tells her that Ravi left the place seven years ago and she has been waiting for him ever since. Vennela promises to deliver her letter to him and bring him back.

Vennela continues her search and learns that she can find Ravi at the Bhupalpally degree college. However, Vennela is frisked by the police who suspect her to be a Naxal sympathizer. The police bring her to the college to confirm her identity, only to engage in a shootout with Ravi's troop. Unable to meet him there, Vennela reaches out to Shakuntala, a human rights activist, and confesses her love for Ravi. Shakuntala arranges Vennela's meeting with Ravi but Ravi politely declines her proposal by saying he doesn't believe in love.

Meanwhile, the police arrive at that place and surround the building. Vennela helps to set up the explosives so that Ravi's troop can escape, however, she gets caught by the police. Ravi rescues her later that night and shelters her at Shakuntala's home. Vennela then decides to join the Naxals in the forest against Shakuntala's advice. Sammaiah, a senior party leader appreciates her spirit and recommends her to Ravi's troop. While Ravi initially rejects her recruitment, he lets her join based on Bharathakka's suggestion. Vennela takes up the arms and earns the party's appreciation for her humanitarian approach to the Naxal movement.

Sometime later, Sammaiah is caught by the police who threaten to expose his fraud of using the Naxal movement for financial benefits. He rejoins Ravi's troop to act as a covert agent of the police. Meanwhile, Vennela handovers the letter to Ravi and requests him to meet his mother. Based on a tip by Sammaiah, the police attack Ravi while he's meeting his mother. Ravi and Vennela fend off the police and escape. That night, Sammaiah kills 11 members of Ravi's troop by launching an assault on them and escapes. Sammaiah publicly claims that the Naxal movement has lost its ideals, therefore, it is infiltrated by his coverts who would work for the police.

Police send a false message from the party to Ravi which instructions him to weed out the covert in his troop. Raghu who was always wary of Vennela tells that she is the covert as she was Sammaiah's recruit. Bharatakka seconds him by proving that Vennela entered their troop using a string of lies. Bharatakka beats up Vennela asking for her confession but she pleads innocence. Vennela tries to submit her lost diary as proof of her innocence, only in vain. Regardless, Bharatakka confirms to Ravi that Vennela is the covert.

Ravi takes Vennela to a secluded place in the forest. Ravi confesses his love for Vennela but feels that she betrayed him. Angry and resentful, Ravi shoots Vennela into the adjoining waterfalls. Raghu and Bharatakka rush to Ravi and tell him that the message was fake. Distressed Ravi retrieves Vennela's body from the waters and sobs in grief, as do others.

== Cast ==
- Sai Pallavi as Vennela
- Rana Daggubati as Dr. Ravi Shankar aka Comrade Ravanna and 'Aranya'
- Priyamani as Comrade Bharathakka
- Nandita Das as Shakuntala
- Naveen Chandra as Comrade Raghu
- Zarina Wahab as Ravi's mother
- Easwari Rao as Vennela's mother
- Sai Chand as Vennela's father
- Rahul Ramakrishna as Vennela's cousin
- Nivetha Pethuraj in cameo appearance as Dr. Sarala, aka Comrade Saralakka

== Production ==
=== Development ===
In June 2018, Venu Udugula stated that his second directorial venture would be a period love story set in the backdrop of the 1990s, and it would be a "commercial entertainer" focusing on politics and action, apart from being centered on romance. Sai Pallavi and Rana Daggubati were signed to play the lead roles in November 2018. The film was launched in June 2019 in Hyderabad.

The film is set during the Naxal movement which happened in Telangana in the 1990s. Udugula wrote the story from the events he witnessed from his childhood in Warangal. Pallavi's character Vennela is based on Thumu Sarala, a 16-year-old girl from Warangal district. Sarala quit her studies in 1992 and enrolled herself in the Peoples War Group to join the naxalites in their cause. However, Sarala was killed by the naxals a month later under mysterious circumstances. Udugula felt the need to bring this story onto the screen, depicting the incident and the politics behind it. The plot, however, follows a fictional storyline and characters written by Udugula. Following the film's release, Pallavi, Daggubati and Udugula met Sarala's family to express their condolenses.

The film is titled Virata Parvam, based on the fourth book of the Indian epic Mahabharata. The film is not related to the epic but Udugula stated that it shares several elements from that episode. “As my film has elements such as politics, conspiracy, love, vendetta and positivity, we felt that it would be an apt title,” Udugula added.

=== Casting ===
Daggubati is cast in the role of Dr Ravi Shankar alias Comrade Ravanna. For his role, Daggubati reduced his weight in order to look lean for the film. Gopichand was Udugula's first choice for the lead before Daggubati was finalised.

In May 2019, Priyamani was cast as Comrade Bharathakka, a Naxalite, and documentary filmmaker Sai Chand was also appeared for a supporting role in the very same month. Tabu was initially cast in the film, but due to schedule conflicts she was subsequently replaced by Nandita Das in August 2019. The film marked Nandita Das' return to Telugu cinema, whose last appearance in a Telugu film was Kamli (2006). Naveen Chandra, Zareena Wahab and Easwari Rao, and are cast in supporting roles. Actress Nivetha Pethuraj is signed to play a crucial role in the film.

=== Filming ===
The film was launched at a formal ceremony on 15 June 2019 by which principal photography began. Filming of the first schedule took place at Dharipally in the rural part of Telangana, which is a minor schedule being wrapped up on 1 July 2019. A lengthy schedule was held at Parkal, Warangal in September 2019 with portions involving Pallavi being shot. In November 2019, Jaya Krishna Gummadi who eventually worked on the film was replaced by Dani Sanchez-Lopez after the former opted out citing schedule conflicts. Hollywood stunt choreographer Stefan Richter was brought on board to direct the film's action sequences. Filming of some crucial scenes took place in the forests of Kerala in January 2020, and also in forests of Vikarabad and Warangal. It is reported that major portion of the film has been shot before it was halted due to COVID-19 pandemic. The filming resumed in December 2020, with the final schedule taking place in Hyderabad.

== Soundtrack ==
Virata Parvam

Soundtrack album by Suresh Bobbili
- Released: 30 June 2022
- Genre: Feature film soundtrack
- Length: 32:33
- Labels: Lahari Music; T-Series
- Producer: Suresh Bobbili

Suresh Bobbili chronology
Guvva Gorinka (2020)	Virata Parvam (2022)	Power Play (2021)
External audio
- Audio Jukebox on YouTube

Singles from Virata Parvam
- 1. "Kolu Kolu" Released: 25 February 2021; 2. "Nagaadaarilo" Released: 2 June 2022

The film's soundtrack and score is composed by Suresh Bobbili who worked with Udugula in Needi Naadi Oke Katha. The first single from the film, "Kolu Kolu", written by Chandrabose and sung by Divya Mallika and Bobbili, was released by Lahari Music on 25 February 2021.

The second single from the film,"Nagaadaarilo", written by Varam and sung by Dyavari Narendar Reddy, Sanapati Bhardwaj Patrudu, was released on 2 June 2022.

Track listing
No.	Title	Lyrics	Singer(s)	Length
1.	"Kolu Kolu"	Chandrabose	Divya Malika, Suresh Bobbili	3:47
2.	"Nagaadaarilo"	Dyavari Narendar Reddy, Sanapati Bharadwaj Patrudu	Varam	3:18
3.	"Chalo Chalo - The Warrior Song"	Jilukara Srinivas	Suresh Bobbili	2:53
4.	"Aasale Nee Rekkalaithe"	Mittapalli Surender	Yepuri Somanna	3:14
5.	"Seshappa Padyam"	Seshappa Kavi	Sarath Santhosh	2:29
6.	"Dharulaniyu Moose"	Krishna Shasthri	Swaroopa Reddy	1:51
7.	"Thalli Manase"	Deyeri Narendar Reddy	Brinda, Sindhuja Srinivasan	3:04
8.	"Mogulu Meeda Vennela"	Mitra	Vimalakka	2:27
9.	"Penchukunna Prema Kosam"	Mittapalli Surender	Yepuri Somanna	4:28
10.	"Pain of Vennela"	Deyeri Narendar Reddy	Sivani Saraswathula	2:55
11.	"Kolu Kolu - Love Version"	Chandrabose	Nutana Mohan	1:33

== Release ==
=== Theatrical ===
Virata Parvam was released theatrically on 17 June 2022. Earlier, in response to the direct OTT release rumours in September 2020, the makers rejected such claims had announced that the film is scheduled only for theatrical release. The film was scheduled for theatrical release on 30 April 2021 but was postponed in April 2021 due to the rising COVID-19 cases in the country. In May 2022, the film's release date was announced as 1 July 2022 but later that month, the date was advanced to 17 June 2022.

=== Home media ===
The post-theatrical streaming rights of the film were acquired by Netflix. The film started streaming from 1 July 2022.

== Reception ==
=== Critical reception ===
Virata Parvam received positive reviews from critics. Neeshita Nyayapati of The Times of India rated the film 3.5 out of 5 stars and wrote "Virata Parvam is not the kind of film that’s entertaining in the conventional sense, but it is the kind of film that stays with you". Janani K of India Today rated the film 3.5 out of 5 stars and wrote "Virata Parvam is a moving tale about two revolutionaries that hits the right note. With terrific performances and brilliant music, the film is sure to invoke emotions from everyone". Sowmya Rajendran of The News Minute rated the film 3 out of 5 stars and wrote "Virata Parvam is a middling love story that’s buoyed by Sai Pallavi’s performance". Latha Srinivasan of Firstpost rated the film 2.5 out of 5 stars and wrote "Sai Pallavi as Vennela in Virata Parvam strikes a strong chord with the audience because of the range of emotions she essays so effortlessly on screen". A critic for Pinkvilla rated the film 2.5 out of 5 stars and wrote "Sai Pallavi's glorious performance is the only thing that keeps the love story from seeming farcical and flimsy". Director Pa. Ranjith took to twitter mentioning, "Virata Parvam is the best Telugu film I've seen in recent years".

=== Box office ===
Virata Parvam grossed ₹2.5 crore (US$270,000) worldwide on its first day with ₹1.5 crore (US$160,000) coming from Telangana and Andhra Pradesh. In the first week, the film grossed ₹10 crore worldwide.

Despite positive reviews, the film performed poorly at the box office. Virata Parvam grossed ₹12 crore worldwide, against a budget of ₹50 crore.

=== Accolades ===
Award (Note: Awards, festivals and organizations are in alphabetical order.)	Date of ceremony (Note: Date is linked to the article about the awards held that year, wherever possible.)	Category	Recipient(s)	Result	Ref.
Filmfare Awards South	2024	Best Actress – Telugu	Sai Pallavi	Nominated	
Filmfare Awards South	2024	Best Supporting Actress – Telugu	Nandita Das	Won	
Filmfare Awards South	2024	Best Supporting Actress – Telugu	Priyamani	Nominated	
Filmfare Awards South	2024	Best Lyricist – Telugu	Chandrabose ("Kolu Kolu")	Nominated	
Filmfare Awards South	2024	Best Female Playback Singer – Telugu	Divya Malika ("Oh Prema")	Nominated	
Filmfare Awards South	2024	Critics Best Actress – Telugu	Sai Pallavi	Won	
