= Sai Pallavi =

Indian actress (born 1992)

- Pallavi in 2026
- Born: Sai Pallavi Senthamarai Kannan; 9 May 1992 (age 34); Coimbatore, Tamil Nadu, India
- Education: Tbilisi State Medical University (MD)
- Occupation: Actress
- Years active: 2005–present
- Awards: Full list
- Honours: Kalaimamani (2021)

Signature
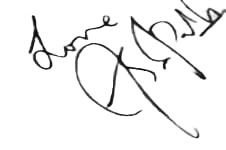

Sai Pallavi Senthamarai Kannan (pronounced [saɪ paˈləvi]; born 9 May 1992) is an Indian actress who primarily works in Tamil, Telugu, and Malayalam films, alongside Hindi cinema. Known for her natural, girl-next-door screen presence and for portraying women in emotionally challenging circumstances, she has received several accolades, including a Tamil Nadu State Film Award, seven Filmfare Awards South, and three SIIMA Awards. One of South India's highest-paid actresses, she was featured in Forbes India's 2020 list of 30 Under 30 and was honoured with the Kalaimamani award by the Government of Tamil Nadu.

Following uncredited appearances as a child artist and background dancer alongside stints in regional television dance shows and commercials, Pallavi had her breakthrough with Alphonse Puthren's 2015 Malayalam romantic drama Premam, winning the Filmfare Award for Best Female Debut – South for her portrayal of Malar. She made an acclaimed Telugu debut in Sekhar Kammula's Fidaa (2017)—dubbing in her own voice in the Telangana dialect and earning her first Filmfare Award for Best Actress – Telugu—before entering Tamil cinema with Diya (2018).

Pallavi subsequently cemented her status across South Indian cinema with critical and commercial hits including Kali (2016), Middle Class Abbayi (2017), Maari 2 (2018), Athiran (2019), Paava Kadhaigal (2020), Love Story (2021), Shyam Singha Roy (2021), Virata Parvam (2022), Gargi (2022), Amaran (2024), and Thandel (2025), winning five additional Filmfare awards across Best Actress and Critics categories. Also celebrated for her dance numbers, her song "Rowdy Baby" with Dhanush from Maari 2 became the first South Indian video to surpass one billion views on YouTube.

In 2026, Pallavi debuted in Hindi cinema with Ek Din before achieving pan-Indian and international prominence as Goddess Sita in Nitesh Tiwari's epic Ramayana: Part 1 (2026), one of the highest-grossing Indian films of all time. She followed this with the Tamil action-thriller O.M: Operation Mole (2026) and is next set to headline Mani Ratnam's romantic drama Inji Vellam (2027).

== Early life and education ==
Sai Pallavi Senthamarai Kannan was born on 9 May 1992 into a Badaga family in Coimbatore, Tamil Nadu. Her ancestral hometown is Kotagiri in the Nilgiris district. She was born to Senthamarai Kannan, a Central Excise officer and former football player, and Radha Kannan, a dancer. Growing up in a household that emphasised both physical athletics and artistic expression, Pallavi developed a passion for sports from an early age and is an avid badminton player. Her younger sister, Pooja Kannan, also entered the film industry as an actress.

Pallavi was raised in Coimbatore and completed her primary and secondary education at Avila Convent School. Following the completion of her schooling, she chose to pursue higher studies in medicine abroad and enrolled at the Tbilisi State Medical University in Georgia. She completed her medical training and graduated with a Medical Degree (MD) in 2016, a degree recognised by the Medical Council of India. On 31 August 2020, Pallavi took and successfully passed the Foreign Medical Graduate Examination (FMGE) held in Trichy to validate her foreign medical qualifications in India. Despite completing her medical education, she chose not to register as a practising medical physician, electing instead to pursue a full-time career in acting and cinema. In addition to her native Badaga and Tamil, Pallavi is multilingual and speaks Kannada, English, Malayalam, Telugu, Hindi, and Georgian.

== Acting career ==
=== Early dance career and minor roles (2005–2013) ===
Pallavi's initial foray into the film industry began with uncredited roles as a background dancer and junior artist. She made her first on-screen appearance as a child artist in the Tamil film Kasthuri Maan (2005), and later appeared as a junior artist in Dhaam Dhoom (2008), where she can be seen in the background. Prior to these minor roles, her natural inclination toward performing arts was evident during her schooling years in Coimbatore, where she frequently participated in cultural events and local dance competitions. Despite these early brushes with the camera, she did not immediately pursue full-time acting opportunities, prioritising her primary and secondary education instead.

Her early dance career included prominent participation in television reality shows. In 2008, she competed in the Tamil dance show Ungalil Yaar Adutha Prabhu Deva on Star Vijay, reaching the semi-finals, followed by her participation in ETV's Telugu show Dhee Ultimate Dance Show (D4) in 2009–2010, where she finished as a finalist. Her high-energy performances on television earned her a significant following among regional audiences, introducing her distinct dance style characterised by fluidity and expressive micro-facial movements. These televised competitions laid the groundwork for her future cinematic breakthrough, as video archives from these shows eventually caught the attention of filmmakers years later.

During this period, she also appeared in regional television advertisements and acted in the Tamil short film Kaatchi Pizhai (2011). Director Sekhar Kammula had initially envisioned her for a role in his coming-of-age musical drama Happy Days (2007) after noticing her on a dance reality show. However, Pallavi turned down the offer to focus entirely on finishing her school education, maintaining her family's commitment to academics.

=== Breakthrough (2014–2016) ===
She was the first choice for the female lead in Madras (2014) opposite Karthi. Director Pa. Ranjith had initially approached her for the role of Kalaiarasi, a strong-willed girl from North Chennai. While Pallavi found the script compelling, she ultimately declined the offer to ensure it did not conflict with her medical studies at Tbilisi State Medical University in Georgia, leading the makers to eventually cast Catherine Tresa.

While Pallavi was in her pre-final year of medical school in Georgia, entirely focused on her exams, Malayalam film director Alphonse Puthren—who had previously attempted to reach her six years earlier after seeing clippings from her reality show appearances on Facebook—phoned her directly. Initially suspecting him to be a stalker and considering lodging a police complaint, Pallavi agreed to listen once Puthren properly introduced himself. She subsequently accepted the role of Malar in his romantic film Premam (2015) opposite Nivin Pauly. Although Puthren had originally considered casting Asin for the part, the character was rewritten to be a Tamilian lecturer. This cultural shift allowed Pallavi to use her native Tamil accent, creating a linguistic juxtaposition within a mainstream Malayalam film that resonated deeply across South India. In 2014, five members of the production team flew to Coimbatore to formally audition her. Once finalised, Pallavi flew back to India and shot her scenes entirely during her college holidays before returning immediately to Georgia to sit for her medical exams. Premam became an unprecedented cultural phenomenon, with her realistic, no-makeup portrayal receiving immense acclaim from critics and audiences alike. She went on to win several "Best Female Debut" honours, including the Filmfare Award for Best Female Debut – South.

Following Premam, director Rathna Kumar offered her the female lead in Meyaadha Maan (2017) opposite Vaibhav, but scheduling conflicts with her final medical examinations forced her to opt out, with the role eventually going to Priya Bhavani Shankar. In 2016, she took a month's break from her studies after receiving a call from Dulquer Salmaan to star opposite him as Anjali in Sameer Thahir's Malayalam psychological thriller Kali. The high-intensity thriller demanded a sharp departure from her comforting image in Premam, requiring her to portray domestic vulnerability and rising psychological dread as a young wife coping with her husband's extreme anger issues. A critical and commercial success, the role earned her a nomination for the Filmfare Award for Best Actress – Malayalam.

=== Career progression and fluctuations (2017–2019) ===
The year 2017 marked her debut in Telugu cinema with Sekhar Kammula's romantic drama Fidaa, in the role of Bhanumathi, a feisty, independent village girl from Telangana. To prepare for the film, she worked extensively with language coaches to master the dialect and cadence of the Telangana region, dubbing her own lines seamlessly. Her performance was universally acclaimed, was named one of the "100 Greatest Performances of the Decade" by Film Companion, and won her first Filmfare Award for Best Actress – Telugu. During this period, director Sandeep Reddy Vanga approached her for the female lead in Arjun Reddy (2017) opposite Vijay Deverakonda, which she declined due to her discomfort with the script's depictions of physical abuse and extensive intimacy, leading to the casting of Shalini Pandey. Later in 2017, she starred in the action comedy Middle Class Abbayi alongside Nani, which emerged as a major critical and commercial success.

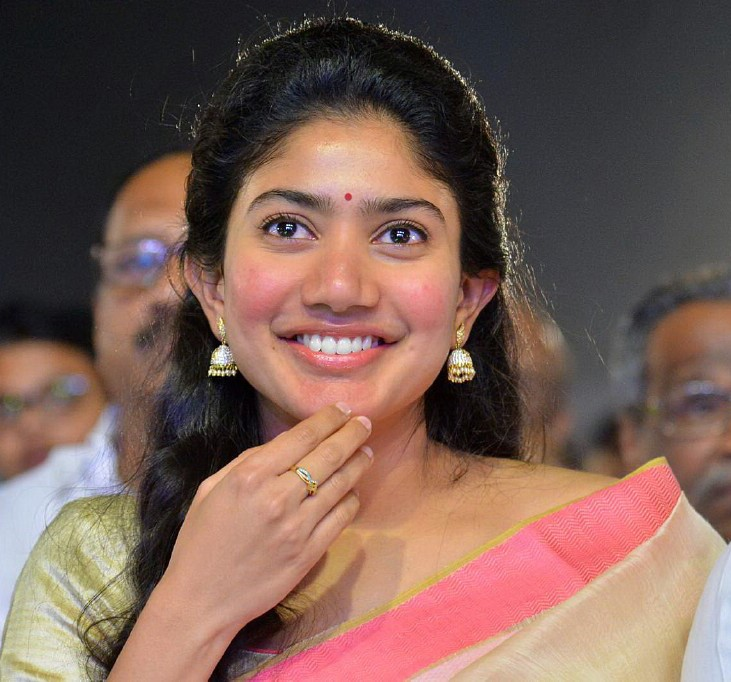
Pallavi at the pre-release event of Middle Class Abbayi in 2017

Her official Tamil debut materialised in 2018 with director A. L. Vijay's bilingual psychological drama Diya (titled Kanam in Telugu) for Lyca Productions, after a planned Tamil remake of Charlie opposite R. Madhavan was shelved. This followed a series of Tamil projects she had exited or been replaced in: she had successfully auditioned for Mani Ratnam's Kaatru Veliyidai (2017) before the director opted for a visually older actress (Aditi Rao Hydari), opted out of Vijay Chander's Sketch (2017), and saw Rajiv Menon's Sarvam Thaala Mayam delayed. Diya ultimately had an average box office run.

In May 2018, she declined the female lead opposite Vijay Deverakonda in Bharat Kamma's Dear Comrade (2019) due to extensive lip-lock sequences in the script, generating widespread discussion regarding her strict boundaries on onscreen intimacy. Later in 2018, she starred opposite Dhanush in Balaji Mohan's Tamil action-comedy Maari 2 as "Araathu" Aanandhi. The film's dance number "Rowdy Baby", choreographed by Prabhu Deva and assisted by Jani Master, became a global viral sensation and the first South Indian video song to surpass 1.5 billion views on YouTube. Collaborating with Prabhu Deva on the exact sets where she had been eliminated ten years prior on Ungalil Yaar Adutha Prabhu Deva marked a celebrated full-circle moment in her career. Her final release of 2018, the Telugu romance Padi Padi Leche Manasu opposite Sharwanand, failed commercially. Following its box-office losses, Pallavi drew widespread industry praise when she refused to accept the remaining balance of her agreed salary in solidarity with the producers.

In 2019, Pallavi declined commercial star vehicles including Mahesh Babu's Sarileru Neekevvaru (2020) and Dulquer Salmaan's Kannum Kannum Kollaiyadithaal (2020) due to insufficient character depth, and opted out of Vetrimaaran's Asuran (2019) owing to tight preparation schedules. Instead, she played Nithya Lakshmi, a non-verbal autistic character, in the Malayalam psychological thriller Athiran opposite Fahadh Faasil, conducting extensive pre-production research with specialised trainers to deliver a nuanced physical performance. She also starred opposite Suriya as Geetha Kumari in Selvaraghavan's Tamil political drama NGK, which emerged as a commercial success despite mixed critical reviews.

=== Established actress and critical acclaim (2020–2023) ===
In 2020, Pallavi was recognised by Forbes India in its "30 Under 30" list as the sole representative from the Indian film industry. That year, she starred as Sumathi in Vetrimaaran's segment Oor Iravu in the Netflix anthology film Paava Kadhaigal, earning critical praise and a SIIMA nomination for her portrayal of a pregnant woman caught in a tragic honour killing conflict. In early 2021, she turned down major commercial projects alongside top Tamil stars Vijay and Ajith Kumar, as well as Chiranjeevi's Bhola Shankar (2023), reiterating her preference for original scripts where female protagonists hold strong narrative agency rather than decorative roles or remakes.

In 2021, Pallavi reunited with Sekhar Kammula for the Telugu romantic drama Love Story opposite Naga Chaitanya, playing Mounika, an aspiring dancer facing caste and systemic abuse. A major critical and commercial hit, the film featured her acclaimed choreography and dance performance in the viral Telangana folk song "Saranga Dariya". Later that year, she starred opposite Nani in Rahul Sankrityan's period drama Shyam Singha Roy, portraying Maithreyi (Rosie), a 1970s Kolkata devadasi, earning praise for her classical dance number "Pranavalaya". Her performances in both films won her twin honours at the 67th Filmfare Awards South: Best Actress – Telugu and the Critics Award for Best Actress.

In 2022, she starred as Vennela in Venu Udugula's 1990s Naxalite-era drama Virata Parvam opposite Rana Daggubati. Although the film underperformed commercially, critics widely praised Pallavi's committed portrayal as the emotional anchor of the narrative. She followed this with Gautham Ramachandran's Tamil legal drama Gargi (2022), playing a schoolteacher fighting to prove her father's innocence in a sexual assault case. Dubbing her own lines across the Tamil, Telugu, and Kannada versions, Pallavi received career-best critical acclaim, winning the Tamil Nadu State Film Award for Best Actress, the Filmfare Award for Best Actress – Tamil, and the Critics Award for Best Actress – Telugu for Virata Parvam.

=== Career expansion and widespread pan-Indian recognition (2024–present) ===
In 2024, Pallavi starred opposite Sivakarthikeyan in Rajkumar Periyasamy's biographical war drama Amaran, produced by Kamal Haasan's Raaj Kamal Films International, portraying Indhu Rebecca Varghese, wife of Major Mukund Varadarajan. While some reviewers noted minor inconsistencies in her Malayalam accent, her deeply emotional portrayal was widely praised as the heart of the film. Emerging as a sleeper blockbuster and the second-highest-grossing Tamil film of 2024, the role won her a seventh Filmfare Award. In 2025, she reunited with Naga Chaitanya for Chandoo Mondeti's survival drama Thandel, based on the real-life capture of Srikakulam fishermen by Pakistani forces. A commercial success, the film earned Pallavi praise from critics such as OTTPlay for her command over colloquial rural Srikakulam diction. In 2026, Samantha Ruth Prabhu revealed that Pallavi had been the original choice for the Telugu hit Maa Inti Bangaaram before scheduling conflicts prompted script revisions.

Pallavi in 2026

In May 2026, Pallavi made her official Hindi cinema debut opposite Junaid Khan in Sunil Pandey's romantic drama Ek Din, filmed against the winter backdrop of Sapporo, Japan. Although critics appreciated her natural screen presence, the film received mixed reviews and underperformed at the box office.

Pallavi achieved monumental pan-Indian and global recognition portraying Goddess Sita opposite Ranbir Kapoor as Rama and Yash as Ravana in Nitesh Tiwari's epic Ramayana: Part 1 (released 5 November 2026). Preceded by an extensive international promotional tour spanning Los Angeles, London, Delhi, and Chennai—where her traditional Kanjivaram attire and understated spiritual preparation drew widespread media attention—the ₹2,000 crore production became an unprecedented box-office juggernaut, crossing ₹1,430 crore worldwide within twelve days to rank among the highest-grossing Indian films in history. Shortly thereafter, she reunited with Dhanush and director Rajkumar Periyasamy for the Tamil spy action-thriller O.M: Operation Mole (released 20 November 2026), portraying IPS officer Nithya Reddy alongside Mammootty and Sreeleela. In a notable departure from her signature long hair, Pallavi cut her hair short for the part—a physical transformation she revealed initially prompted her father to ask whether she was wearing a wig. During multi-city promotional events across Kochi, she candidly addressed past online trolling over her Malayalam diction in Amaran.

Upcoming projects

Pallavi will next star opposite Vijay Sethupathi in veteran filmmaker Mani Ratnam's urban romantic drama Inji Vellam, scheduled for worldwide theatrical release on 29 January 2027, marking her first completed collaboration with the director years after her initial casting replacement. She will also reprise her role as Goddess Sita in Ramayana: Part 2 in late 2027.

== Media image ==
Sai Pallavi

Sai Pallavi is widely recognised as one of the highest-paid and most influential actresses in Indian cinema. Film critics and media outlets frequently highlight her natural screen persona, emotive micro-expressions, and unpretentious off-screen demeanor. Film journalist Subha J. Rao noted that she brings "freshness" to cinema, observing that "Sai Pallavi comes across as someone unafraid to flaunt her unconventional looks, offbeat film choices and lack of pretence." Rediff.com ranked her second in its "Top 5 Malayalam Actresses" list of 2016. In 2020, she was the sole actress featured on Forbes India's "30 Under 30" list, ranked 20th among the most influential South Indian cinema stars on Instagram in 2021, became one of the most tweeted-about South Indian actresses of 2021, and was honoured in Forbes India's inaugural "Showstoppers – India's Top 50 Outperformers" list in 2022. In 2026, Time magazine named her to its TIME100 Next India list, recognising her as one of India's emerging influential figures.

Her artistic legacy is closely tied to her commitment to naturalism—appearing without heavy makeup or cosmetic retouching of her facial acne—and her self-taught dancing prowess. Having debuted as a choreographer with "Rockaankuthu" in Premam (2015), she delivered several landmark musical sequences across Indian cinema, including "Vachinde" (Fidaa), "Rowdy Baby" (Maari 2), "Saranga Dariya" (Love Story), and "Pranavalaya" (Shyam Singha Roy). In recognition of her contributions to Tamil cinema and performing arts, she was awarded the Kalaimamani by the Government of Tamil Nadu.

== Off-screen work ==
Pallavi maintains a sustained commitment to humanitarian initiatives and grassroots social welfare. In September 2015, she participated in a public walkathon in Kochi to raise awareness and financial assistance for cancer patients. She also inaugurated the Aster Sick Kids (ASK) foundation under Dr. Moopen's Healthcare Foundation to provide free medical treatment to financially disadvantaged children. During the COVID-19 pandemic in India, she leveraged her social media reach to encourage fan clubs to redirect birthday celebration budgets toward direct food distribution and essential relief supplies for vulnerable communities and healthcare workers. Additionally, she regularly supports eco-friendly living campaigns and educational access initiatives for underprivileged children.

== Personal life ==
Pallavi in 2024

=== Religious faith and spirituality ===
Raised in a traditional Badaga Hindu household in the Nilgiris, Pallavi is deeply spiritual and frequently visits temples across South India, including Tirupati, Madurai, and shrines in her ancestral hometown of Kotagiri. She has spoken openly about how prayer, meditation, and spiritual surrender anchor her daily routine and creative preparation—most notably during the filming of Ramayana, where she revealed that she would meditate on set and pray for divine guidance before portraying Goddess Sita. Following a strict vegetarian lifestyle, she attributes her grounded temperament and minimal material needs to her spiritual upbringing.

=== Health issues, complexion, and body positivity ===
Pallavi has been candid about her early struggles with severe facial acne, rosacea, and vocal insecurities during her teenage years and medical college days. Following the release of Premam (2015), widespread audience acceptance of her un-retouched, acne-marked skin helped her overcome her self-consciousness. Since then, she has consistently refused heavy cosmetic makeup and digital skin smoothing on screen, speaking out against colorism and unrealistic beauty standards while advocating for self-acceptance regarding natural Indian skin tones and complexion.

=== Controversies ===
Working relationship allegations (2018)

During the promotional phase for the 2018 bilingual film Kanam (titled Diya in Tamil), actor Naga Shourya publicly alleged in an interview that Pallavi displayed short-tempered behaviour and threw tantrums on set. Pallavi later addressed the remarks during a promotional event, expressing surprise and clarifying that she always respected her co-stars and maintained a professional demeanor on set, which led to the issue quietly subsiding.

Rejection of fairness cream endorsement (2019)

In 2019, Pallavi attracted widespread national attention after rejecting a commercial advertisement deal worth ₹2 crore (equivalent to roughly US$240,000) for a fairness cream brand. Explaining her decision in subsequent interviews, she stated:

This is Indian colour. We can't go to foreigners and ask them why they're white... That's their skin colour and this is ours. Africans have their own colour too and they are beautiful. What will I do with the money I get from such an ad? I'll go home and eat three chapatis or rice. I don't have big needs. I see if I can contribute to the happiness of people around me or if I can say that these standards we see are wrong.

— Sai Pallavi

Her decision was praised across Indian media as a landmark stand against colorism.

Remarks on Kashmir conflict and religious violence (2022)

In June 2022, during a promotional interview with GreatAndhra for her film Virata Parvam, Pallavi commented on the subjective nature of religious violence. She stated that while the film The Kashmir Files (2022) depicted the tragic violence faced by Kashmiri Pandits during the 1990 exodus, it was philosophically comparable to recent incidents of cow vigilantism, citing an instance where a Muslim truck driver was assaulted and forced to chant "Jai Shri Ram." The snippet went viral on social media, leading to police complaints filed against her in Hyderabad and criticism from political groups who accused her of equating a historic exodus with localised crimes. Pallavi subsequently released a video statement on Instagram clarifying that her remarks were taken out of context, reiterating that she would never trivialise human suffering and that her comments were intended as a universal stance against all forms of violence.

Resurfaced comments on the Indian Army (2024)

In October 2024, during promotions for the military biographical film Amaran, an edited video excerpt from her 2022 interview resurfaced online. In the clip, Pallavi remarked: "People in Pakistan think our army is a terrorist group. But for us, it is them. So, the perspective changes. I don't understand violence." The circulating clip generated online backlash, with social media campaigns calling for a boycott of Amaran and claiming the statement disrespected the armed forces. Media outlets and commentators defended Pallavi, noting that the clip was selectively edited and formed part of a broader pacifist narrative against armed conflict. The film ultimately opened to high box-office returns without commercial disruption.

AI-generated deepfake images (2025)

In September 2025, private photographs from Pallavi's vacation in Australia with her sister, Pooja Kannan, were digitally manipulated using generative AI tools. The altered deepfake images falsely depicted the actress in revealing attire, leading to targeted trolling online questioning her casting as Sita in Nitesh Tiwari's mythological adaptation Ramayana. On 26 September 2025, Pallavi addressed the fabricated imagery directly by publishing the original video footage from her trip on social media, clarifying that the altered images were fake and reiterating her boundary between personal life and professional work. The incident sparked broader media discourse on AI abuse and celebrity privacy protection in India.

Ramayana promotional remarks and reception debates (2026)

Following the release of the Ramayana: Part 1 trailer in July 2026 and during its international promotional tour in October 2026, Pallavi's casting as Goddess Sita faced polarised online commentary regarding conventional beauty standards. At the Los Angeles world premiere in October 2026, Pallavi further sparked social media debate after remarking on the red carpet that "Ravana is not all bad" while discussing human complexity and recognising internal flaws.

== Filmography ==
Key
†	Denotes films that have not yet been released

=== Films ===
List of films and roles
Year	Title	Role(s)	Language	Notes	Ref.
2005	Kasthuri Maan	—	Tamil	Uncredited junior artist; cameo	
2008	Dhaam Dhoom	—	Tamil	Uncredited junior artist; cameo	
2011	Kaatchi Pizhai	Anu	Tamil	Short film	
2015	Premam	Malar	Malayalam	Also choreographed the song "Rockaankuthu"	
2016	Kali	Anjali	Malayalam		
2017	Fidaa	Bhanumathi	Telugu		
2017	Middle Class Abbayi	Pallavi / Chinni (Note: Pallavi played a single character with two or more names)	Telugu		
2018	Diya	Thulasi	Tamil	Bilingual film	
2018	Kanam	Thulasi	Telugu	Bilingual film	
2018	Padi Padi Leche Manasu	Vaishali Cherukuri	Telugu		
2018	Maari 2	"Araathu" Aanandhi Mariyappan	Tamil		
2019	Athiran	Nithya Lakshmi	Malayalam		
2019	NGK	Geetha Kumari	Tamil		
2020	Paava Kadhaigal	Sumathi	Tamil	Netflix Anthology Film Segment: "Oor Iravu"	
2021	Love Story	Mounika Rani	Telugu	Also co-choreographed the song "Saranga Dariya" with Sekhar	
2021	Shyam Singha Roy	Maithreyi / Rosie Singha Roy	Telugu		
2022	Virata Parvam	Vennela	Telugu		
2022	Gargi	Gargi	Tamil		
2024	Amaran	Indhu Rebecca Varghese	Tamil		
2025	Thandel	Koracha Sathya "Bujji Thalli"	Telugu		
2026	Ek Din	Meera Ranganathan	Hindi		
2026	Ramayana: Part 1	Sita	Hindi	voice-over by Ami Trivedi	
2026	O.M: Operation Mole	ASP Nithya Reddy IPS	Tamil		
2027	Inji Vellam †	TBA	Tamil	Completed	
2028	Ramayana: Part 2 †	Sita	Hindi	Filming	

=== Television ===
List of television roles
Year	Title	Role(s)	Language(s)	Channel	Ref.
2008–2009	Ungalil Yaar Adutha Prabhu Deva?	Contestant	Tamil	Star Vijay	
2010–2011	Dhee 4	Contestant	Telugu	ETV	

== Accolades ==
Pallavi was honoured with Kalaimamani in the year 2021 by the Government of Tamil Nadu. For the film Gargi, She won a Tamil Nadu State Film Award for Best Actres. She also won seven Filmfare Awards South from eleven nominations — Best Female Debut – South for Premam, Best Actress – Telugu for Fidaa and Love Story, and Critics Best Actress – Telugu for Shyam Singha Roy and Virata Parvam, and Best Actress – Tamil for Gargi and Amaran.
