= Kali (2016 film) =

- Theatrical release poster
- Directed by: Sameer Thahir
- Written by: Rajesh Gopinadhan
- Produced by: Ashiq Usman; Shyju Khalid; Sameer Thahir
- Starring: Dulquer Salmaan; Sai Pallavi; Chemban Vinod Jose; Vinayakan; Soubin Shahir
- Cinematography: Girish Gangadharan
- Edited by: Vivek Harshan
- Music by: Gopi Sundar
- Production company: Hand Made Films
- Distributed by: Central Pictures
- Release date: 26 March 2016
- Running time: 115 minutes
- Country: India
- Language: Malayalam

Kali (transl. Anger) is a 2016 Indian Malayalam-language romantic action thriller film directed and co-produced by Sameer Thahir. It stars Dulquer Salmaan and Sai Pallavi in lead roles. It also stars Chemban Vinod Jose, Vinayakan and Soubin Shahir in supporting roles. It is the second collaboration of Sameer and Salmaan, after Neelakasham Pachakadal Chuvanna Bhoomi (2013).

The film was shot in Kochi, Vagamon, Athirappilly, Masinagudi, and Gudalur.

Kali was released on 26 March 2016 to critical and commercial success. It has since been remade in Kannada as Kidi and in Marathi as Circuitt. The film was dubbed and released into Telugu as Hey Pillagada in November 2017.

== Plot ==
Siddharth suffers from severe anger management issues and finds it difficult to control himself for petty issues. He is in love with his classmate Anjali. The duo gets married after their graduation against the wishes of their parents. With the help of his friends, Siddharth gets a job at a bank in Kochi. Anjali tells Siddharth that he should control his anger for which anger management schools can be attended. Anjali's parents invite them for Anjali's brother's engagement where Anjali tells her mother to make her father call Siddharth. Siddharth concentrates on his work to bring down his anger and encounters foolish customers, much to his irritation.

In one such instance, Anjali breaks up with Siddharth mentioning that she cannot lead a life with him. Siddharth offers to take her home at Masinagudi in Tamil Nadu. On the way, a trucker named Chakkara overtakes their car without warning, which almost causes the couple to crash. Furious, Siddharth follows Chakkara and successfully overtakes him, but Anjali begs him to leave the matter. On the way, they stop at a restaurant for dinner, which is headed by a ruthless gangster named John. The couple learns that Chakkara is also one of John's henchmen. Siddharth gets into trouble due to his temper and learns that Chakkara have obsession on Anjali.

Siddharth is about to get into a fight with Chakkara, but Anjali stops him. When both of them realize they don't have cash, the hotel staff suggests one of them to leave and bring the cash from the nearby ATM. Anjali doesn't want to leave alone but leaves for the ATM though she lacks driving skills. After she leaves, Chakkara leaves the restaurant. Fearing the worst, Siddharth tries to contact Anjali, who is also unable to contact Siddharth due to lack of network. She also doesn't find any ATM. She notices Chakkara's truck following her and trying to scare her so that she cannot drive the car in the lonely road. She continues driving, but is unable to escape as it is a one-way road.

Fearing Anjali's safety, Siddharth tries to escape from the restaurant, but is captured by the henchmen and is locked in a room. Anjali keeps on driving where another trucker, who had noticed the couple in the restaurant, witnesses the chase. Siddharth tries to escape from the room where a young boy opens the locked room. Siddharth steps into the middle of a gang war. At the same time, Chakkara corners Anjali when her car gets stuck in the mud, but escapes when the other trucker arrives on the scene with police which enables Anjali to escape from Chakkara's cruel intentions. Anjali, along with the police, arrives back at the restaurant to find John injured and Siddharth with a knife.

Siddharth is arrested, but John reports to the police that the restaurant's previous owner arrived with a gang to kill him. Siddharth and Anjali continue their journey where Siddharth apologizes to Anjali and promises to control his anger, though it cannot be done overnight and tells her that he is sure he can change with her by his side and Anjali agrees. On the way, they encounter Chakkara, whose truck has broken down. Siddharth decides to leave him, but Anjali, who is furious with Chakkara, refuses to forgive him for harassing her. Anjali stops the car as a sign to tell Siddharth that something must be done and so he steps out to vent his anger with Anjali's complete approval and charges towards Chakkara.

== Cast ==
- Dulquer Salmaan as Siddharth
  - Nebish Benson as Teenage Siddharth
    - Dev Prayag Hari as Young Siddharth
- Sai Pallavi as Anjali
- Chemban Vinod Jose as Chakkara Shaji
- Vinayakan as John
- Soubin Shahir as Prakashan
- V. K. Prakash as Siddharth's father
- Sandhya Ramesh as Siddharth's mother
- Sidhartha Siva as Service Centre Manager
- Sandeep Narayanan as SI Senthil Kumar
- Vanitha Krishnachandran as Anjali's mother
- Dinesh Panicker as Anjali's father
- Kunchan as House Owner
- Alencier Ley Lopez as FD Customer
- Anjali Nair as House owner's daughter
- Master Ihman as House owner's grandson
- Hareesh Perumanna as Hamsa
- Imthiyaz Khader as Bank Manager
- Lukman Avaran as Bank Customer
- Sini Abraham as Smitha
- Thanseel P. S. as Alex, Sidharth's friend
- Vijilesh Karayad as Moped Guy
- Karthik Vishnu as Waiter Boy

== Soundtrack ==
The music is composed by Gopi Sunder and the soundtrack was released on 11 March 2016 by Satyam Audios.

| No. | Title | Lyrics | Singer(s) | Length |
|---|---|---|---|---|
| 1. | "Chillu Ranthal" | B K Harinarayanan | Job Kurian | 5:03 |
| 2. | "Vaarthinkalee" | B K Harinarayanan | Divya S. Menon | 4:33 |

== Reception ==
=== Critical response ===
Arathi Kannan of Onmanorama gave 3.5/5 stars and wrote "Starting with smaller anger bytes, Kali grows in proportion and momentum to make for an extempore in 'what anger could lead to'. In a flash, one sees a change in situations, the ball has shifted court, anger has bared its fangs, and Kali has won it, fair and square." Goutham V.S. of The Indian Express gave 3.5/5 stars and wrote "Dulquer Salmaan looked possessed with ‘Kali’ as the actor yet again delivered his charisma on screen while expressing hysterical shades of anger, throughout the movie."

Deepa Soman of The Times of India gave 3/5 stars and wrote "Kali is brisk and concise; watch it for Dulquer Salman and Sai Pallavi's performances."

== Remake ==
Kali has been remade in Kannada as Kidi and also remade in Marathi as Circuitt.

== Box office ==
The total earnings of the movie in 27 days from the US box office is ₹30.18 lakh (US$31,000) from 3rd weekend from UK box office. The film is reported to have collected ₹16.4 crore at the Kerala box office.
