= Shyam Singha Roy =

2021 Indian film by Rahul Sankrityan

- Theatrical release poster
- Directed by: Rahul Sankrityan
- Screenplay by: Rahul Sankrityan
- Story by: Janga Satyadev
- Produced by: Venkat Boyanapalli
- Starring: Nani; Sai Pallavi; Krithi Shetty
- Cinematography: Sanu John Varghese
- Edited by: Naveen Nooli
- Music by: Mickey J. Meyer
- Production company: Niharika Entertainment
- Release date: 24 December 2021
- Running time: 157 minutes
- Country: India
- Language: Telugu
- Budget: ₹50 crore
- Box office: ₹65 crore

Shyam Singha Roy is a 2021 Indian Telugu-language period romantic action drama film directed by Rahul Sankrityan. Partly set in the backdrop of Kolkata in the 1970s, it is based on the theme of reincarnation. The film stars Nani in a dual role alongside Sai Pallavi and Krithi Shetty in the female leads with Madonna Sebastian and Rahul Ravindran in the supporting roles. The film tells the story of Vasu, an aspiring director who is blamed for plagiarism, as he starts to experience visions of his previous life as Shyam Singha Roy, a fierce Bengali social reformer.

The film was announced in February 2020. Principal photography took place from December 2020 to July 2021 in Hyderabad and Kolkata. It was theatrically released on 24 December 2021 and opened to mixed to positive reviews with critics praising the direction, story, music, editing, cinematography and cast performances while criticizing the screenplay. It became the seventh highest-grossing Telugu film of 2021.

== Plot ==
In Hyderabad, Vasudev "Vasu" Ghanta, an aspiring film director, casts psychology graduate Keerthi in his short film. During shooting, Vasu defends Keerthi from harassers, suffering from a severe head injury that causes ear bleeding and triggers a psychological condition resulting in temporary personality shifts. Impressed by the completed short film, a producer green-lights Vasu's debut feature film, Uniki. At the celebratory party, Keerthi kisses Vasu, leading to an intimate encounter in his bedroom. However, Vasu suddenly zones out and mutters the name "Rosie", prompting a hurt Keerthi to break up with him over suspected infidelity. A year later, Uniki releases to critical and commercial gain.

Vasu travels to Mumbai to negotiate the film's Hindi remake but is arrested for copyright infringement. Kolkata-based publisher SR Publications alleges Uniki is a scene-by-scene plagiarism of Astitva, a 1970s best-selling novel written by revolutionary author Shyam Singha Roy. Represented by Keerthi's cousin Padmavathi, Vasu maintains his innocence and passes a polygraph test, securing a temporary bail. Seeking a scientific explanation for his subconscious knowledge of the story, Keerthi consults her professor in Tamil Nadu. Under hypnosis, Vasu accesses his memories revealing that he is the reincarnation of Shyam Singha Roy and that Rosie was his wife.

In 1969 West Bengal, Shyam Singha Roy is a fierce communist reformer and social critic born in an orthodox family. Disowning his family's conservative values, Shyam encounters Maitreyi, a Devadasi from East Pakistan forced to dance at a local temple during Navaratri. Intrigued by her art form, Shyam visits the temple at nights and eventually convinces her to escape her servitude. Renaming her Rosie, Shyam falls in love with her. On the night of their planned escape, the temple's corrupt high priest, Mahant, attempts to assault a young Devadasi. When Rosie intervenes, Mahant brutally attacks and humiliates her. Outraged, Shyam confronts Mahant during the festival, decapitates him in the temple, and severs Rosie's ritual necklace, liberating her from the Devadasi system.

Shyam and Rosie move to Calcutta, marry, and establish a printing press, where Shyam rises to prominence as a controversial author while Rosie operates a trust to rehabilitate former Devadasis. In 1977, one of Shyam's elder brothers, Manoj, convinces him to visit their ailing elder brother, Debendra, in their hometown. Upon his arrival, Debendra and the second brother deceptively murder him to restore family honor, devastating Manoj. Years later, Shyam's nephews take control of his estate and establish SR Publications.

Back in the present, Padmavathi presents Shyam's regression hypnosis reports in court, but the prosecution dismisses reincarnation concept as legally invalid. Before the verdict is delivered, an 85-year-old Manoj enters the courtroom and confirms Vasu is indeed Shyam. As definitive proof, Manoj reveals that Vasu's debut short film was an exact adaption of Varna, an unpublished manuscript written by Shyam that was never released to the public. Producing the original handwritten manuscript, Manoj drops all charges on behalf of SR Publications, leading to Vasu's full acquittal.

Manoj informs Vasu that Rosie survived and has spent decades awaiting his return. Vasu travels to Kolkata and meets the elderly Rosie at her dance academy. Recognizing her lost love in Vasu, Rosie experiences an emotional reunion before passing away peacefully in his arms.

== Cast ==
- Nani in a dual role as
  - Vasudev Ghanta "Vasu", an aspiring filmmaker
  - Shyam Singha Roy, a legendary Bengali writer
- Sai Pallavi as Maithreyi alias Rosie Singha Roy, a former Devadasi turned Shyam's wife
- Krithi Shetty as Keerthi, Vasu's girlfriend (Voice dubbed by RJ Swetha).
- Madonna Sebastian as Lawyer Padmavathi, Keerthi's cousin (Voice dubbed by Raveena Ravi).
- Rahul Ravindran as Manoj Singha Roy
- Abhinav Gomatam as Pramod
- Jisshu Sengupta as Debendra Singha Roy
- Murali Sharma as Lawyer Krishnamurthy
- Manish Wadhwa as Mahadev Mahant
- Leela Samson as Psychologist
- Subhalekha Sudhakar as Judge J. Satyendra
- Sivannarayana Naripeddi as Keerthi's father
- Ankith Koyya as Bunny, Cinematographer for Vasudev
- Barun Chanda as Sayan Sarkar, Printing Press Owner
- Sadhwi Majumder as Shashi, Rosie's best friend
- Pradeep Rudra as Shyam Singha Roy's nephew
- Anurag Kulkarni in a cameo appearance in the song "Pranavalaya"

== Production ==
=== Development ===
On 18 December 2019, Rahul Sankrityan narrated a script to Nani, which was considered to be an "innovative story". The project was initially reported to be produced under Suryadevara Naga Vamsi's Sithara Entertainments banner, who initially worked with Nani in Jersey (2019). The film was announced in February 2020, with the title Shyam Singha Roy, and was expected to go on floors in May 2020, although the launch was delayed due to the COVID-19 pandemic in India. During March 2020, A. R. Rahman was approached to compose music for the film, and Nirav Shah was in charge of handling the cinematography. Later Anirudh Ravichander was announced as the composer as Rahman apparently did not accept the offer. The film was meant to be Anirudh's third collaboration with Nani after Jersey and Nani's Gang Leader.

The film was expected to be made on a huge scale, marking the most expensive film in Nani's career. However, producer Naga Vamsi wanted to cut down the budget citing the pandemic, as the estimated cost was much higher; Vamsi wanted to shelve the project, while Nani was completing the shoot of Tuck Jagadish. Due to differences of opinion between Nani and Vamsi, the production was handed over to Venkat Boyanapalli, who produced the film under his newly established production company, Niharika Entertainment.

On 25 October 2020, a new poster was launched coinciding with Dusshera, with the inclusion of composer Mickey J. Meyer, cinematographer Sanu John Varghese and editor Naveen Nooli. Director Sankrityan revealed that the film is based on the theme of reincarnation and partially set against the backdrop of Kolkata.

=== Casting ===
Sai Pallavi, who also collaborated with Nani in Middle Class Abbayi, was cast in the film. It was reported that Rashmika Mandanna was approached for a lead role, Impressed by her song from Uppena and her photographs, Nani decided to cast Krithi Shetty in the film. Madonna Sebastian was also confirmed as a lead, marking her come back to the Telugu cinema after Premam (2016). Murali Sharma, Abhinav Gomatam, and Rahul Ravindran were later included in the cast. In March 2021, Bengali actor Jisshu Sengupta was signed to play an important role in the film. This also marked the Telugu debut for Bharatanatyam dancer, Leela Samson.

=== Filming ===
The film was launched at a private ceremony in Hyderabad on 11 December 2020, in the presence of the cast and crew, and Nani's father gave the muhurat shot for the film. Principal photography began on 21 December 2020 in Hyderabad, India. A Kolkata-themed street along with the Kalighat Kali Temple was constructed on a budget of ₹6 crores. In February 2021, the team began filming crucial scenes in Kolkata. Filming was briefly halted due to COVID-19 lockdown in India and was resumed in July 2021. The Kolkata set in Hyderabad was damaged due to heavy rains and was restored by art director Avinash Kolla. Filming was completed on 26 July 2021 and post-production began.

== Music ==
Shyam Singha Roy

Soundtrack album by Mickey J. Meyer
- Released: 15 January 2022
- Recorded: 2020–2021
- Genre: Feature film soundtrack
- Length: 21:44
- Language: Telugu
- Label: Saregama
- Producer: Mickey J. Meyer

Mickey J. Meyer chronology
Sreekaram (2021)	Shyam Singha Roy (2022)	Ramabanam (2023)

Singles from Shyam Singha Roy
- 1. "Rise of Shyam" Released: 7 November 2021; 2. "Edo Edo" Released: 25 November 2021; 3. "Sirivennala" Released: 7 December 2021; 4. "Pranavalaya" Released: 18 December 2021; 5. "Tara" Released: 23 December 2021

The soundtrack album is composed by Mickey J. Meyer and the audio rights were acquired by Saregama. The song "Pranavalaya" is set in the popular Carnatic raga Shuddha Dhanyasi (known as Raag Dhani in Hindustani Music), in its purest form. This song became a popular classical dance number.

Telugu version

No.	Title	Lyrics	Singer(s)	Length
1.	"Rise of Shyam"	Krishna Kanth	Anurag Kulkarni, Vishal Dadlani, Cizzy	3:53
2.	"Edo Edo"	Krishna Kanth	Chaitra Ambadipudi	3:23
3.	"Sirivennala"	Sirivennela Seetharama Sastry	Anurag Kulkarni	4:13
4.	"Pranavalaya"	Sirivennela Seetharama Sastry	Anurag Kulkarni	4:21
5.	"Tara"	Krishna Kanth	Karthik	2:51
6.	"Sirivennela (Female Version)"	Sirivennela Seetharama Sastry	Chaitra Ambadipudi	3:00
Total length:				21:44

Tamil version

All lyrics are written by Soundararajan K.

No.	Title	Singer(s)	Length
1.	"Rise of Shyam"	Anurag Kulkarni, Vishal Dadlani, Cizzy	3:53
2.	"Yedho Yedho"	Chaitra Ambadipudi	3:24
3.	"Thoduvanandhaa"	Nakul Abhyankar	4:13
4.	"Jagadheeswara Devi"	Anurag Kulkarni	4:21
5.	"Pookum"	Karthik	2:51
Total length:			21:44

== Release ==
=== Theatrical ===
The film was originally scheduled for release on 24 December 2020, coinciding with Christmas, but was eventually postponed as filming was delayed due to the COVID-19 pandemic. The film was released on 24 December 2021. Apart from Telugu, the film was dubbed and released in Tamil, Malayalam, and Kannada languages.

=== Home media ===
Gemini TV acquired the satellite rights of the film in Telugu, while Netflix acquired the digital rights in Telugu, Tamil, and Malayalam. The film began streaming through Netflix on 21 January 2022.

== Reception ==
=== Box office ===
Movie overall business valued at ₹130 crore and it collected ₹14 crore in Nizam, ₹36 crore in Andhra Pradesh and in both Telugu speaking states it collected ₹28 crore distributor share of gross ₹53 crore. Total worldwide it collected share of ₹100 crore.

=== Critical response ===
Shyam Singha Roy received mixed to positive reviews with critics praising the performances while criticizing the screenplay.

Sangeetha Devi Dundoo of The Hindu opnied that "This isn't to say that this is a sub par film. But with a little more thought, it could have been way smarter. Despite these niggles, there's plenty going for Shyam Singha Roy". Giving a rating of 3.5 out of 5, Neeshita Nyayapati of The Times of India wrote: "Shyam Singha Roy might not have a story that's completely out of the box but the staging does have the potential to bowl you over. Barring the underwhelming aspects, give this one a chance this weekend if you're longing for something that's well-made and backed by a stellar cast", appreciating the acting performances of Nani and Sai Pallavi, and the story. Calling it "engrossing", The News Minute's Sowmya Rajendran too gave a rating of 3.5 out of 5. She has praised the screenplay, story, direction and acting by the ensemble cast, commenting that "Sai Pallavi is the show-stealer, performing a role that's tailor-made for her".

Manoj Kumar R of The Indian Express called the film "a revolutionary romantic tale". He finally wrote: "To director-writer Rahul Sankrityan's credit, the film's hero lives and fights by the pen, instead of resorting to violence. The period portions of the film is a sight for sore eyes. The retro look of Nani and Sai Pallavi oozes charm. Pallavi's classical dance performance draped in a red saree is a sight to behold. Just her presence on the screen elevates a scene to another level". Firstpost's Sankeertana Varma praised the technical department of the film stating: "Navin Nooli's editing, too, helps intertwine the two timelines to give the viewer a glimpse into Vasu's psyche—what he is seeing and how unclear it all is. Sanu John Varughese's cinematography and Kolla Avinash's production design shoulder the film as well. While Sanu's camera daftly manoeuvres between the two timelines—the way Sai Pallavi's introduction song is shot, choreographed, and cut needs special mention, Avinash's period detailing does transport the viewer to a time gone by". Writing for India Today, Janani K said that "Cinematographer Sanu John Varghese's visuals, especially in the period portions, are exceptional. Music by Mickey J Meyer tugs at our heartstrings. Shyam Singha Roy could have been a taut and crisp story about reincarnation. Since it takes a familiar route, the overall effect takes a dip". Prakash Pecheti of Telangana Today felt that the film falls short of becoming a masterpiece. He further wrote: "'Shyam Singha Roy' would've been an engaging one if characters had some depth in establishing them. One might even think that a realistic approach might have fetched the story well".

== Accolades ==
Award	Date of ceremony	Category	Recipient(s) and nominee(s)	Result	Ref.
Filmfare Awards South	9 October 2022	Best Director – Telugu	Rahul Sankrityan	Nominated	
Filmfare Awards South	9 October 2022	Best Actor – Telugu	Nani	Nominated	
Filmfare Awards South	9 October 2022	Critics Best Actor – Telugu	Nani	Won	
Filmfare Awards South	9 October 2022	Best Actress – Telugu	Sai Pallavi	Nominated	
Filmfare Awards South	9 October 2022	Critics Best Actress – Telugu	Sai Pallavi	Won	
Filmfare Awards South	9 October 2022	Best Supporting Actress – Telugu	Madonna Sebastian	Nominated	
Filmfare Awards South	9 October 2022	Best Lyricist – Telugu	Sirivennela Seetharama Sastry – (for "Pranavalaya")	Nominated	
Filmfare Awards South	9 October 2022	Best Male Playback Singer – Telugu	Anurag Kulkarni – (for "Sirivennela")	Nominated	
