= Gargi (film) =

2022 Tamil legal drama film directed by Gautham Ramachandran

- Theatrical release poster
- Directed by: Gautham Ramachandran
- Written by: Hariharan Raju; Gautham Ramachandran
- Produced by: Ravichandran Ramachandran; Thomas George; Aishwarya Lekshmi; Gautham Ramachandran
- Starring: Sai Pallavi; Kaali Venkat
- Cinematography: Sraiyanti; Premkrishna Akkattu
- Edited by: Shafique Mohamed Ali
- Music by: Govind Vasantha
- Production companies: Blacky, Genie & My Left Foot Productions
- Distributed by: 2D Entertainment; Sakthi Film Factory; Paramvah Studios
- Release date: 15 July 2022
- Running time: 137 minutes
- Country: India
- Language: Tamil

Gargi is a 2022 Indian Tamil-language legal drama film directed and co-written by Gautham Ramachandran and produced by Blacky, Genie & My Left Foot Productions. Co-written by Hariharan Raju. The film features Sai Pallavi in the titular role along with Kaali Venkat, while R. S. Shivaji, Saravanan, Livingston, Jayaprakash and Kavithalaya Krishnan play supporting roles. The film's music is composed by Govind Vasantha with cinematography handled by Sraiyanti and Premkrishna Akkatu and editing done by Shafique Mohamed Ali. Gargi was released on 15 July 2022 and received positive reviews from critics who praised the cast performances, the script, the direction, and the social message.

== Plot ==
Gargi is a dedicated schoolteacher from a struggling family, consisting of her mother, who sells homemade rice batter, her middle-school-aged sister, Akshara, and her father, Brahmanandam, who works as a security guard in an apartment complex. Their modest lives are shattered when Brahmanandam is arrested and accused, alongside four other men, of sexually assaulting a young child. Undeterred by the severe public backlash and community outrage, Gargi remains fiercely resolved to prove her father's innocence. To her, Brahmanandam is a hero who once protected her from a predatory teacher during her own childhood and instilled in her the courage to stand up to evil.

As the family faces intense public hostility, they are abandoned by their close family friend, Banuprakash, a highly successful attorney who refuses to take the case. In their desperation, Indrans Kaliaperumal, a struggling, low-profile junior lawyer under Banuprakash, agrees to represent Brahmanandam, reasoning that he has no professional reputation to lose. During the initial court hearing, Indrans cross-examines the investigating officer and uncovers a critical procedural error: the traumatized victim was administered a high dose of barbiturates at the hospital, rendering her identification of Brahmanandam legally inadmissible.

Indrans later confronts the victim's devastated father, who admits that he pressured his catatonic, heavily traumatized daughter into pointing out Brahmanandam because he was personally convinced of the guard's guilt. By exposing these inconsistencies and the lack of concrete forensic evidence, Indrans successfully secures conditional bail for Brahmanandam.

The defense begins to unravel when Gargi speaks with her father's security colleague. Although the colleague had initially claimed to be at home during the time of the assault, he accidentally lets slip that he was actually present in a drunken stupor. He reveals that he was the one who first discovered the injured child and immediately alerted Brahmanandam. This revelation directly contradicts Brahmanandam's alibi that he was off-site drinking during the incident, sowing seeds of doubt in Gargi's mind.

Determined to uncover the absolute truth, Gargi visits the recovering child in the hospital and presents her with a photograph of her father. The child's terrified reaction confirms Gargi's worst fears: Brahmanandam was indeed the fifth perpetrator who participated in the assault. Realizing the monstrous truth about her father, Gargi personally exposes his guilt, leading to his swift arrest and ultimate conviction. Outside the courthouse, a devastated Gargi takes a moment alone to quietly process the horror of her father's betrayal. The film concludes on a somber yet hopeful note, revealing that Gargi and her family have relocated to start anew, having sought and received reconciliation with the young victim.

== Cast ==
- Sai Pallavi as Gargi, a school teacher
- Kaali Venkat as Adv. Indrans Kaliyaperumal, a Junior lawyer
- R. S. Shivaji as Brahmanandam, Gargi's father
- Saravanan as Saravanan
- Livingston as Sandra's father
- Jovita Livingston as Sandra
- Jayaprakash as Banuprakash, Indrans's senior lawyer
- Kavithalaya Krishnan as Public Prosecutor
- Rajalakshmi P as Gargi's mother
- Kalesh Ramanand as Pazhani
- Sudha S as Judge
- Captain Prathap as Bennix Jayaraj
- Regin Rose as Saravanan's relative
- Nakkalites Dhanam as Saravanan's relative
- Prajuna Sarah as Aksarah
- Bigil Siva as Young Gargi's teacher
- Mahendra Mullath as commissioner
- Aishwarya Lekshmi as Ahalya (cameo appearance)

== Production ==
The film was directed by Gautham Ramachandran. Sai Pallavi was cast as Gargi, replacing Jyothika who was originally expected to have the role. The film was announced on 9 May 2022 with the makers releasing a special glimpse of the film. Aishwarya Lekshmi and Gautam Ramachandran were also the producers for the film.

== Music ==
Gargi

Soundtrack album by Govind Vasantha
- Released: 13 July 2022
- Recorded: 2022
- Genre: Indian pop
- Length: Telugu version: 11:58
- Languages: Tamil; Telugu
- Label: Sony Music

Govind Vasantha chronology
Jo and Jo (2022)	Gargi (2022)	19(1)(a) (2022)

The film's soundtrack is composed by Govind Vasantha while lyrics are written by Karthik Netha.

Track listing
No.	Title	Lyrics	Singer(s)	Length
1.	"Yaathri"	Karthik Netha	Ravi G	2:24
2.	"Maasaru Ponne"	Karthik Netha	Govind Vasantha, Krithika Karthick Pandiyan	3:53
3.	"Thoovi Thoovi"	Karthik Netha	Ravi G	3:13
4.	"Chinna Maamiye"	Nithi Kanagaratnam	Nithi Kanagaratnam	2:39
Total length:				11:58

== Release ==
=== Theatrical ===
Gargi was released theatrically worldwide on 15 July 2022.

=== Home media ===
The post-theatrical rights of the film were sold to SonyLIV, while the satellite rights of the film are sold to Kalaignar TV.

== Reception ==
=== Critical response ===
Gargi received positive reviews from critics who praised the cast performances, script, direction, and social message. On the review aggregator website Rotten Tomatoes, 100% of 7 critics' reviews are positive, with an average rating of 7.5/10.

The Times of India rated the film 4 out of 5 stars and wrote, "A superbly shot, hard-hitting drama that unfolds more like a tense thriller, Gautham Ramachandran's Gargi is an essential film in this #MeToo era." The Indian Express also rated the film 4 out of 5 stars and wrote, "Sai Pallavi and Kaali Venkat bring their best to a challenging drama about crime, punishment and justice system." Praising Sai Pallavi's performance, The Hindu wrote, "This is probably Sai Pallavi's best performance till date... It's a wholesome performance that few actresses have given in recent times." Cinema Express rated the film 4.5 out of 5 stars and stated that "Nevertheless, these are minor misgivings in this film about many underdogs. Gargi stands by many such people. It stands by its trans woman judge, who is at the receiving end of sly digs. It stands by its stuttering amateur lawyer, who, when stressed, struggles to make an argument. And above all, it stands by its women. You see this never more than when the film doesn’t end with Gargi seeing her father’s case through to a resolution. It ends with her own transformation."

However, India Today critic stated that "Gargi is also technically strong "and gave 3.5 stars out of 5. Priyanka Sundar of Firstpost wrote that "The film doesn’t fall into the trap of taking sides and this purely a result of sensitive and smart writing.".Pinkvilla critic noted that " 'Gargi' is so purposive and sincere that even seemingly dry lines spoken in the courtroom hit hard." and gave 3 out of 5 rating.

== Accolades ==
List of Gargi awards and nominations
Year	Award Ceremony	Category	Nominee	Result	Ref.
2023	Ananda Vikatan Cinema Awards	Best Film	Gargi	Nominated	
2023	Ananda Vikatan Cinema Awards	Best Director	Gautham Ramachandran	Nominated	
2023	Ananda Vikatan Cinema Awards	Best Actress	Sai Pallavi	Won	
2023	Ananda Vikatan Cinema Awards	Best Supporting Character	Kaali Venkat	Won	
2023	Ananda Vikatan Cinema Awards	Best Story	Hariharan Raju Gautham Ramachandran	Nominated	
2023	Ananda Vikatan Cinema Awards	Best Screenplay	Hariharan Raju Gautham Ramachandran	Won	
2023	Ananda Vikatan Cinema Awards	Best Lyrics	Karthik Netha, Yaathri for the song "Maasaru Penney"	Nominated	
2023	Ananda Vikatan Cinema Awards	Best Production	Blacky, Genie & My Left Foot Productions	Nominated	
2023	Critics' Choice Film Awards	Gender Sensitivity Award	Gargi	Won	
2023	Critics' Choice Film Awards	Best Actress	Sai Pallavi	Won	
2023	Norway Tamil Film Festival Awards	Best Actress	Sai Pallavi	Won	
2023	Indian Film Festival of Melbourne	Best Actress	Sai Pallavi	Nominated	
2024	Filmfare Awards South	Best Film	Gautam, Aishwarya Lekshmi	Nominated	
2024	Filmfare Awards South	Best Actress	Sai Pallavi	Won	
2024	Filmfare Awards South	Best Supporting Actor	Kaali Venkat	Won	
